= Alpine skiing at the 2018 Winter Olympics – Men's super-G =

Men's super-G at the XXIII Olympic Winter Games
- Alpine skiing
- Venue: Jeongseon Alpine Centre, Gangwon Province, South Korea
- Date: 16 February 2018
- Competitors: 61 from 29 nations
- Winning time: 1:24.44

Medalists
| 1st place, gold medalist(s) | | Matthias Mayer | Austria |
| 2nd place, silver medalist(s) | | Beat Feuz | Switzerland |
| 3rd place, bronze medalist(s) | | Kjetil Jansrud | Norway |

The men's super-G competition of the PyeongChang 2018 Olympics was held on 16 February 2018 at the Jeongseon Alpine Centre in PyeongChang. Originally set to be held on 15 February 2018, the race was rescheduled to 16 February 2018 after high winds forcing the men's downhill race on 11 February 2018 to be moved to 15 February 2018.

In the victory ceremony, the medals were presented by Paul Tergat, member of the International Olympic Committee, accompanied by Peter Schroecksnadel, FIS Council member.

== Qualification ==
A total of up to 320 alpine skiers qualified across all eleven events. Athletes qualified for this event by having met the A qualification standard only, which meant having 80 or less FIS Points and being ranked in the top 500 in the Olympic FIS points list. The Points list takes into average the best results of athletes per discipline during the qualification period (July 1, 2016 to January 21, 2018). Countries received additional quotas by having athletes ranked in the top 30 of the 2017–18 FIS Alpine Ski World Cup (two per gender maximum, overall across all events). After the distribution of B standard quotas (to nations competing only in the slalom and giant slalom events), the remaining quotas were distributed using the Olympic FIS Points list, with each athlete only counting once for qualification purposes. A country could only enter a maximum of four athletes for the event.

== Results ==
The race was started at 11:00.

| Rank | Bib | Name | Country | Time | Behind |
|---|---|---|---|---|---|
| 1st place, gold medalist(s) | 15 | Matthias Mayer | Austria | 1:24.44 | — |
| 2nd place, silver medalist(s) | 16 | Beat Feuz | Switzerland | 1:24.57 | +0.13 |
| 3rd place, bronze medalist(s) | 7 | Kjetil Jansrud | Norway | 1:24.62 | +0.18 |
| 4 | 10 | Blaise Giezendanner | France | 1:24.82 | +0.38 |
| 5 | 9 | Aksel Lund Svindal | Norway | 1:24.93 | +0.49 |
| 6 | 3 | Vincent Kriechmayr | Austria | 1:25.13 | +0.69 |
| 7 | 17 | Dominik Paris | Italy | 1:25.18 | +0.74 |
| 8 | 12 | Andreas Sander | Germany | 1:25.21 | +0.77 |
| 9 | 4 | Dustin Cook | Canada | 1:25.23 | +0.79 |
| 10 | 6 | Boštjan Kline | Slovenia | 1:25.36 | +0.92 |
| 11 | 5 | Hannes Reichelt | Austria | 1:25.40 | +0.96 |
| 12 | 20 | Thomas Dreßen | Germany | 1:25.51 | +1.07 |
| 13 | 11 | Aleksander Aamodt Kilde | Norway | 1:25.71 | +1.27 |
| 14 | 21 | Ryan Cochran-Siegle | United States | 1:25.72 | +1.28 |
| 15 | 14 | Adrien Théaux | France | 1:25.76 | +1.32 |
| 16 | 18 | Christof Innerhofer | Italy | 1:25.90 | +1.46 |
| 17 | 13 | Max Franz | Austria | 1:25.96 | +1.52 |
| 18 | 25 | Maxence Muzaton | France | 1:26.08 | +1.64 |
| 19 | 29 | Brice Roger | France | 1:26.10 | +1.66 |
| 20 | 32 | Matteo Marsaglia | Italy | 1:26.11 | +1.67 |
| 21 | 28 | Gilles Roulin | Switzerland | 1:26.20 | +1.76 |
| 22 | 26 | Manuel Osborne-Paradis | Canada | 1:26.39 | +1.95 |
| 23 | 33 | Broderick Thompson | Canada | 1:26.45 | +2.01 |
| 24 | 31 | Jared Goldberg | United States | 1:26.49 | +2.05 |
| 25 | 22 | Klemen Kosi | Slovenia | 1:26.50 | +2.06 |
| 26 | 8 | Thomas Tumler | Switzerland | 1:26.52 | +2.08 |
| 27 | 19 | Josef Ferstl | Germany | 1:26.81 | +2.37 |
| 28 | 23 | Joan Verdú | Andorra | 1:26.86 | +2.42 |
| 29 | 35 | Natko Zrnčić-Dim | Croatia | 1:27.05 | +2.61 |
| 30 | 37 | Henrik von Appen | Chile | 1:27.57 | +3.13 |
| 31 | 42 | Andreas Romar | Finland | 1:27.70 | +3.26 |
| 32 | 41 | Christoffer Faarup | Denmark | 1:27.81 | +3.37 |
| 33 | 45 | Marc Oliveras | Andorra | 1:27.84 | +3.40 |
| 34 | 54 | Filip Forejtek | Czech Republic | 1:28.06 | +3.62 |
| 35 | 46 | Ondřej Berndt | Czech Republic | 1:28.30 | +3.86 |
| 36 | 50 | Marco Pfiffner | Liechtenstein | 1:28.57 | +4.13 |
| 37 | 39 | Willis Feasey | New Zealand | 1:28.59 | +4.15 |
| 38 | 49 | Olivier Jenot | Monaco | 1:28.80 | +4.36 |
| 39 | 51 | Andreas Žampa | Slovakia | 1:28.89 | +4.45 |
| 40 | 47 | Jan Zabystřan | Czech Republic | 1:29.68 | +5.24 |
| 41 | 53 | Igor Zakurdayev | Kazakhstan | 1:29.96 | +5.52 |
| 42 | 58 | Yuri Danilochkin | Belarus | 1:30.13 | +5.69 |
| 43 | 38 | Adam Barwood | New Zealand | 1:31.10 | +6.66 |
| 44 | 60 | Kim Dong-woo | South Korea | 1:31.64 | +7.20 |
| 45 | 61 | Simon Breitfuss Kammerlander | Bolivia | 1:31.69 | +7.25 |
| 46 | 52 | Marko Stevović | Serbia | 1:31.70 | +7.26 |
| 47 | 62 | Albin Tahiri | Kosovo | 1:32.74 | +8.30 |
| 48 | 57 | Patrick McMillan | Ireland | 1:33.54 | +9.10 |
| | 1 | Peter Fill | Italy | DNF | |
| | 2 | Mauro Caviezel | Switzerland | DNF | |
| | 24 | Ted Ligety | United States | DNF | |
| | 27 | Andrew Weibrecht | United States | DNF | |
| | 30 | Martin Čater | Slovenia | DNF | |
| | 34 | Marko Vukićević | Serbia | DNF | |
| | 36 | Miha Hrobat | Slovenia | DNF | |
| | 40 | James Crawford | Canada | DNF | |
| | 43 | Filip Zubčić | Croatia | DNF | |
| | 44 | Michał Kłusak | Poland | DNF | |
| | 48 | Jan Hudec | Czech Republic | DNF | |
| | 56 | Ivan Kovbasnyuk | Ukraine | DNF | |
| | 59 | Márton Kékesi | Hungary | DNF | |
| | 55 | Michel Macedo | Brazil | DNS | |
