= Andorra at the 1992 Winter Olympics =

- IOC code: AND
- NOC: Andorran Olympic Committee
- Website: (in Catalan)

in Albertville
- Competitors: 5 (4 men, 1 woman) in 1 sport
- Medals: Gold 0 Silver 0 Bronze 0 Total 0

Winter Olympics appearances (overview)
- 1976; 1980; 1984; 1988; 1992; 1994; 1998; 2002; 2006; 2010; 2014; 2018; 2022; 2026; 2030

Andorra competed at the 1992 Winter Olympics in Albertville, France.

== Competitors ==
The following is the list of number of competitors in the Games.

Sport	Men	Women	Total
Alpine skiing	4	1	5
Total	4	1	5

== Alpine skiing ==
Men

Athlete	Event	Race 1	Race 2	Total	
Athlete	Event	Time	Time	Time	Rank
Victor Gómez	Super-G			DSQ	–
Nahum Orobitg	Super-G			DSQ	–
Gerard Escoda	Super-G			DSQ	–
Ramon Rossell	Super-G			1:19.10	47
Victor Gómez	Giant Slalom	1:12.87	DNF	DNF	–
Ramon Rossell	Giant Slalom	1:12.28	DNF	DNF	–
Nahum Orobitg	Giant Slalom	1:11.37	1:07.93	2:19.30	38
Gerard Escoda	Giant Slalom	1:10.70	1:07.99	2:18.69	36
Ramon Rossell	Slalom	DNF	–	DNF	–
Nahum Orobitg	Slalom	DNF	–	DNF	–
Gerard Escoda	Slalom	57.35	57.36	1:54.71	32

Women

Athlete	Event	Race 1	Race 2	Total	
Athlete	Event	Time	Time	Time	Rank
Vicky Grau	Super-G			1:30.07	37
Vicky Grau	Giant Slalom	DNF	–	DNF	–
Vicky Grau	Slalom	DNF	–	DNF	–
