= Andorra at the 2018 Winter Olympics =

- Flag of Andorra
- IOC code: AND
- NOC: Andorran Olympic Committee
- Website: www.coa.ad (in Catalan)

in Pyeongchang, South Korea 9–25 February 2018
- Competitors: 5 (4 men and 1 woman) in 3 sports
- Flag bearer: Irineu Esteve Altimiras
- Medals: Gold 0 Silver 0 Bronze 0 Total 0

Winter Olympics appearances (overview)
- 1976; 1980; 1984; 1988; 1992; 1994; 1998; 2002; 2006; 2010; 2014; 2018; 2022; 2026

Andorra competed at the 2018 Winter Olympics in Pyeongchang, South Korea, which were held from 9 to 25 February 2018. The country's participation in Pyeongchang marked its twelfth appearance at the Winter Olympics since its debut in 1976. The athlete delegation of the country was composed of five people: Mireia Gutiérrez, Marc Oliveras, and Joan Verdú in alpine skiing, Irineu Esteve Altimiras in cross-country skiing, and Lluís Marín in snowboarding. They all failed to medal. Thus, Andorra has yet to win a Winter Olympic medal.

== Background ==
The 2018 Winter Olympics were held in Pyeongchang, South Korea, from 9 to 25 February 2018. This edition marked the nation's twelfth appearance at the Winter Olympics since its debut at the 1976 Winter Olympics in Innsbruck, Austria. The nation had never won a medal at the Winter Olympics, with its best performance coming from alpine skier Vicky Grau placing 19th in the women's slalom at the 1998 Winter Olympics in Nagano, Japan.

=== Opening and closing ceremonies ===
The Andorran delegation came in 47th out of the 91 National Olympic Committees in the 2018 Winter Olympics Parade of Nations within the opening ceremony. Irineu Esteve Altimiras solely held the flag for the delegation in the parade. At the closing ceremony, she held the flag again.

== Competitors ==
List of Andorran competitors at the 2018 Winter Olympics
Sport	Men	Women	Total
Alpine skiing	2	1	3
Cross-country skiing	1	0	1
Snowboarding	1	0	1
Total	4	1	5

== Alpine skiing ==
Andorra qualified three alpine skiers. The alpine skiing events were held at the Yongpyong Alpine Centre. Marc Oliveras and Joan Verdú first competed in the men's combined on 13 February, placing 29th and 27th respectively. The winner of the event was Marcel Hirscher of Austria. Two days later, the two competed at the men's downhill. Oliveras did not finish his run though Verdú placed 37th. The winner of the event was Aksel Lund Svindal of Norway.

On 15 February, Mireia Gutiérrez competed in her only event, the women's slalom. She placed 30th. The winner of the event was Frida Hansdotter of Sweden.

The men's super-G competition on 16 February would be the last one for Oliveras. He placed 33th while Verdú placed 28th. The winner of the event was Matthias Mayer of Austria. Verdú's last event would be the men's giant slalom though he did not finish in his event. The winner of the event was Hirscher.

Athlete	Event	Run 1		Run 2		Total	
Athlete	Event	Time	Rank	Time	Rank	Time	Rank
Marc Oliveras	Men's combined	1:21.67	31	52.97	30	2:14.64	29
Marc Oliveras	Men's downhill	—N/a				DNF	
Marc Oliveras	Men's super-G	—N/a				1:27.84	33
Joan Verdú	Men's giant slalom	1:12.06	33	DNF			
Joan Verdú	Men's downhill	—N/a				1:44.65	37
Joan Verdú	Men's combined	1:23.01	50	49.53	21	2:12.54	27
Joan Verdú	Men's super-G	—N/a				1:26.86	28
Mireia Gutiérrez	Women's slalom	53.22	34	52.84	31	1:46:06	30

== Cross-country skiing ==
The cross-country skiing events were held at the Alpensia Cross-Country Skiing Centre. Irineu Esteve Altimiras first competed in the men's 30 kilometre skiathlon on 11 February. He finished the 15 kilometre classic of his event in a time of 43:16.5 and the 15 kilometre freestyle in 38:31.2, placing him with a total of 1:21:47.7 and 46th place. The winner of the event was Simen Hegstad Krüger of Norway.

Altimiras' next competition was the men's 15 km freestyle on 16 February. He recorded a time of 35:40.7, placing 27th, while the winner of the event was Dario Cologna of Switzerland. Altimiras' last competition was the men's 50 kilometre classical on 24 February. He recorded a time of 2:19:08.3, placing 34th, while the winner of the event was Iivo Niskanen of Finland.

Distance

Athlete	Event	Classical		Freestyle		Total		
Athlete	Event	Time	Rank	Time	Rank	Time	Deficit	Rank
Irineu Esteve Altimiras	Men's 15 km freestyle	—N/a				35:40.7	+1:56.8	27
Irineu Esteve Altimiras	Men's 30 km skiathlon	43:16.5	45	38:31.2	46	1:21:47.7	+5:27.7	46
Irineu Esteve Altimiras	Men's 50 km classical	—N/a				2:19:08.3	+10:46.2	34

== Snowboarding ==
The snowboarding events were held at Bokwang Phoenix Park and Alpensia Ski Jumping Stadium. Lluís Marín competed in the men's snowboard cross on 15 February. His first run was in a time of 1:15.47 while his second time was at 1:15.37. He did not advance further, placing him 30th. The winner of the event was Pierre Vaultier of France.

Snowboard cross

Athlete	Event	Seeding						1/8 final	Quarterfinal	Semifinal	Final	
Athlete	Event	Run 1		Run 2		Best	Seed	1/8 final	Quarterfinal	Semifinal	Final	
Athlete	Event	Time	Rank	Time	Rank	Best	Seed	Position	Position	Position	Position	Rank
Lluís Marín	Men's snowboard cross	1:15.47	26	1:15.37	6	1:15.37	30	5	Did not advance			

== See also ==
- Andorra at the 2018 Summer Youth Olympics
