= Alpine skiing at the 2018 Winter Olympics – Men's downhill =

Men's downhill at the XXIII Olympic Winter Games
- Alpine skiing
- Venue: Jeongseon Alpine Centre, Gangwon Province, South Korea
- Date: 15 February 2018
- Competitors: 55 from 26 nations
- Winning time: 1:40.25

Medalists
1st place, gold medalist(s)		Aksel Lund Svindal	Norway
2nd place, silver medalist(s)		Kjetil Jansrud	Norway
3rd place, bronze medalist(s)		Beat Feuz	Switzerland

Men's Downhill
- Location: Jeongseon Alpine Centre
- Vertical: 825 m (2,707 ft)
- Top elevation: 1,370 m (4,495 ft)
- Base elevation: 545 m (1,788 ft)

The men's downhill competition of the PyeongChang 2018 Olympics was held on Thursday, 15 February, at the Jeongseon Alpine Centre in PyeongChang. Scheduled for Sunday, 11 February, winds in excess of 50 km/h (31 mph) forced officials to postpone the race four days.

== Summary ==
The defending champion was Matthias Mayer. Other competitors included the 2014 silver medalist Christof Innerhofer, the bronze medalist Kjetil Jansrud, as well as the 2010 silver medalist Aksel Lund Svindal. Through 2018, the Olympic men's downhill has yet to have a repeat champion.

Aksel Lund Svindal won the gold medal, with a slight advantage over Kjetil Jansrud (silver) and Beat Feuz (bronze), who gained his first Olympic medal.

The race course was 2.965 km (1.84 mi) in length, with a vertical drop of 825 m (2,707 ft) from a starting elevation of 1,370 m (4,495 ft) above sea level. Svindal had an average speed of 106.474 km/h (66.16 mph) and an average vertical descent rate of 8.229 m/s (27.00 ft/s).

== Qualification ==
A total of up to 320 alpine skiers qualified across all eleven events. Athletes qualified for this event by having met the A qualification standard only, which meant having 80 or less FIS Points and being ranked in the top 500 in the Olympic FIS points list. The Points list takes into average the best results of athletes per discipline during the qualification period (July 1, 2016 to January 21, 2018). Countries received additional quotas by having athletes ranked in the top 30 of the current World Cup season (two per gender maximum, overall across all events). After the distribution of B standard quotas (to nations competing only in the slalom and giant slalom events), the remaining quotas were distributed using the Olympic FIS Points list, with each athlete only counting once for qualification purposes. A country could only enter a maximum of four athletes for the event.

== Results ==
The race was started at 11:30 local time, (UTC+9). At the starting gate, the skies were clear, the temperature was −3.8 °C (25 °F), and the snow condition was hard.

Rank	Bib	Name	Country	Time	Behind
1st place, gold medalist(s)	7	Aksel Lund Svindal	Norway	1:40.25	—
2nd place, silver medalist(s)	9	Kjetil Jansrud	Norway	1:40.37	+0.12
3rd place, bronze medalist(s)	5	Beat Feuz	Switzerland	1:40.43	+0.18
4	3	Dominik Paris	Italy	1:40.79	+0.54
5	1	Thomas Dreßen	Germany	1:41.03	+0.78
6	13	Peter Fill	Italy	1:41.08	+0.83
7	17	Vincent Kriechmayr	Austria	1:41.19	+0.94
8	4	Brice Roger	France	1:41.39	+1.14
9	11	Matthias Mayer	Austria	1:41.46	+1.21
10	6	Andreas Sander	Germany	1:41.62	+1.37
11	16	Max Franz	Austria	1:41.75	+1.50
12	15	Hannes Reichelt	Austria	1:41.76	+1.51
13	8	Mauro Caviezel	Switzerland	1:41.86	+1.61
14	2	Manuel Osborne-Paradis	Canada	1:41.89	+1.64
15	12	Aleksander Aamodt Kilde	Norway	1:42.18	+1.93
16	14	Bryce Bennett	United States	1:42.22	+1.97
17	18	Christof Innerhofer	Italy	1:42.23	+1.98
18	10	Johan Clarey	France	1:42.39	+2.14
19	28	Martin Čater	Slovenia	1:42.53	+2.28
20	27	Jared Goldberg	United States	1:42.59	+2.34
21	23	Marc Gisin	Switzerland	1:42.82	+2.57
22	25	Emanuele Buzzi	Italy	1:42.84	+2.59
23	34	Ryan Cochran-Siegle	United States	1:42.96	+2.71
23	21	Maxence Muzaton	France	1:42.96	+2.71
25	29	Josef Ferstl	Germany	1:42.98	+2.73
26	19	Adrien Théaux	France	1:42.99	+2.74
27	24	Boštjan Kline	Slovenia	1:43.03	+2.78
28	22	Benjamin Thomsen	Canada	1:43.19	+2.94
29	39	Miha Hrobat	Slovenia	1:43.61	+3.36
30	30	Wiley Maple	United States	1:43.72	+3.47
31	36	Andreas Romar	Finland	1:43.78	+3.53
32	35	Dustin Cook	Canada	1:43.80	+3.55
33	20	Gilles Roulin	Switzerland	1:43.88	+3.63
34	40	Henrik von Appen	Chile	1:44.02	+3.77
35	26	Broderick Thompson	Canada	1:44.37	+4.12
36	38	Christoffer Faarup	Denmark	1:44.48	+4.23
37	37	Joan Verdú	Andorra	1:44.65	+4.40
38	42	Filip Forejtek	Czech Republic	1:44.79	+4.54
39	48	Igor Zakurdayev	Kazakhstan	1:45.01	+4.76
40	45	Christopher Hörl	Moldova	1:45.21	+4.96
41	32	Marko Vukićević	Serbia	1:45.36	+5.11
42	41	Michał Kłusak	Poland	1:45.42	+5.17
43	49	Marco Pfiffner	Liechtenstein	1:45.61	+5.36
44	50	Yuri Danilochkin	Belarus	1:45.86	+5.61
45	46	Jan Hudec	Czech Republic	1:46.42	+6.17
46	47	Jan Zabystřan	Czech Republic	1:46.60	+6.35
47	57	Simon Breitfuss Kammerlander	Bolivia	1:47.87	+7.62
48	53	Kim Dong-woo	South Korea	1:47.99	+7.74
49	51	Ivan Kovbasnyuk	Ukraine	1:48.57	+8.32
50	55	Albin Tahiri	Kosovo	1:48.81	+8.56
51	56	Marko Stevović	Serbia	1:49.50	+9.25
52	52	Patrick McMillan	Ireland	1:49.98	+9.73
53	54	Márton Kékesi	Hungary	1:51.72	+11.47
	31	Klemen Kosi	Slovenia	DNF	
	43	Marc Oliveras	Andorra	DNF	
	33	Natko Zrnčić-Dim	Croatia	DNS	
	44	Ondřej Berndt	Czech Republic	DNS	
