= Alpine skiing at the 2018 Winter Olympics – Men's combined =

Men's combined at the XXIII Olympic Winter Games
- Alpine skiing
- Venue: Jeongseon Alpine Centre, Gangwon Province, South Korea; Yongpyong Alpine Centre, Pyeongchang, South Korea
- Date: 13 February 2018
- Competitors: 65 from 31 nations
- Winning time: 2:06.52

Medalists
1st place, gold medalist(s)		Marcel Hirscher	Austria
2nd place, silver medalist(s)		Alexis Pinturault	France
3rd place, bronze medalist(s)		Victor Muffat-Jeandet	France

The men's combined competition of the PyeongChang 2018 Olympics was held on 13 February 2018 at the Jeongseon Alpine Centre and the Yongpyong Alpine Centre at the Alpensia Sports Park in PyeongChang.

== Summary ==
Marcel Hirscher won the gold medal, with Alexis Pinturault coming in second, and Victor Muffat-Jeandet third. For Muffat-Jeandet, this was the first Olympic medal, and for both Hirscher and Pinturault the first medal in combined. Hirscher, who won six overall World Cup titles and was skiing in his third Olympics, previously only won a silver medal in slalom in 2014.

The defending champion, Sandro Viletta, did not qualify, and the 2014 silver medalist, Ivica Kostelić, retired. The 2014 bronze medalist, Christof Innerhofer, competed and ended at the 14th position. Ted Ligety, the 2015 combined champion, ended fifth. After the downhill, Thomas Dreßen was leading, with Aksel Lund Svindal second and Matthias Mayer third. Svindal decided not to race slalom, and Mayer did not finish. Dreßen posted the 24th time in slalom, which landed him at the 9th position overall. Hirscher was the 12th after downhill and the fastest in the slalom run, which enabled him to win the event. Pinturault came back from the 10th position after the downhill, and Muffat-Jeandet was the 29th after the downhill but posted the second fastest slalom time.

In the victory ceremony, the medals were presented by Willi Kaltschmitt Luján, member of the International Olympic Committee Executive Board, accompanied by Peter Schroecksnadel, FIS council member.

== Qualification ==
A total of up to 320 alpine skiers qualified across all eleven events. Athletes qualified for this event by having met the A qualification standard only, which meant having 140 or less FIS Points and being ranked in the top 500 in the Olympic FIS points list. The Points list takes into average the best results of athletes per discipline during the qualification period (July 1, 2016 to January 21, 2018). Athletes were also required to have 80 or less FIS points in the downhill. Countries received additional quotas by having athletes ranked in the top 30 of the 2017–18 FIS Alpine Ski World Cup (two per gender maximum, overall across all events). After the distribution of B standard quotas (to nations competing only in the slalom and giant slalom events), the remaining quotas were distributed using the Olympic FIS Points list, with each athlete only counting once for qualification purposes. A country could only enter a maximum of four athletes for the event.

== Results ==
The race was started at 11:30 (downhill race) and 15:00 (slalom race).

Rank	Bib	Name	Nation	Downhill	Rank	Slalom	Rank	Total	Behind
1st place, gold medalist(s)	2	Marcel Hirscher	Austria	1:20.56	12	45.96	1	2:06.52	—
2nd place, silver medalist(s)	7	Alexis Pinturault	France	1:20.28	10	46.47	3	2:06.75	+0.23
3rd place, bronze medalist(s)	5	Victor Muffat-Jeandet	France	1:21.57	29	45.97	2	2:07.54	+1.02
4	23	Marco Schwarz	Austria	1:20.98	19	46.89	5	2:07.87	+1.35
5	27	Ted Ligety	United States	1:21.36	26	46.61	4	2:07.97	+1.45
6	14	Thomas Mermillod-Blondin	France	1:20.89	17	47.13	6	2:08.02	+1.50
7	19	Kjetil Jansrud	Norway	1:19.51	4	49.16	19	2:08.67	+2.15
8	33	Štefan Hadalin	Slovenia	1:21.15	21	47.79	7	2:08.94	+2.42
9	1	Thomas Dreßen	Germany	1:19.24	1	49.72	24	2:08.96	+2.44
10	29	Klemen Kosi	Slovenia	1:20.61	16	48.76	15	2:09.37	+2.85
11	6	Luca Aerni	Switzerland	1:21.34	25	48.18	11	2:09.52	+3.00
12	32	Filip Zubčić	Croatia	1:21.54	28	48.06	8	2:09.60	+3.05
12	13	Mauro Caviezel	Switzerland	1:20.47	11	49.13	18	2:09.60	+3.05
14	25	Christof Innerhofer	Italy	1:19.77	5	49.98	25	2:09.75	+3.23
15	30	Carlo Janka	Switzerland	1:20.58	14	49.22	20	2:09.80	+3.28
16	34	Ondřej Berndt	Czech Republic	1:21.81	34	48.10	10	2:09.91	+3.39
17	16	Bryce Bennett	United States	1:21.18	23	48.79	16	2:09.97	+3.45
18	24	Riccardo Tonetti	Italy	1:21.99	38	48.22	12	2:10.21	+3.69
19	21	Natko Zrnčić-Dim	Croatia	1:22.07	40	48.48	13	2:10.55	+4.03
20	47	James Crawford	Canada	1:21.97	37	48.80	17	2:10.77	+4.25
21	17	Aleksander Aamodt Kilde	Norway	1:20.92	18	50.15	26	2:11.07	+4.55
22	40	Adam Žampa	Slovakia	1:23.02	51	48.08	9	2:11.10	+4.58
23	12	Broderick Thompson	Canada	1:21.75	33	49.63	23	2:11.38	+4.86
24	37	Andreas Romar	Finland	1:21.94	35	49.58	22	2:11.52	+5.00
25	35	Marko Vukićević	Serbia	1:21.31	24	50.43	27	2:11.74	+5.22
26	50	Kristaps Zvejnieks	Latvia	1:23.02	51	48.74	14	2:11.76	+5.24
27	38	Joan Verdú	Andorra	1:23.01	50	49.53	21	2:12.54	+6.02
28	54	Olivier Jenot	Monaco	1:22.71	47	50.73	28	2:13.44	+6.92
29	51	Marc Oliveras	Andorra	1:21.67	31	52.97	30	2:14.64	+8.12
30	41	Christoffer Faarup	Denmark	1:21.08	20	54.13	34	2:15.21	+8.69
31	52	Igor Zakurdayev	Kazakhstan	1:22.29	42	53.18	32	2:15.47	+8.95
32	49	Dalibor Šamšal	Hungary	1:25.17	60	50.77	29	2:15.94	+9.42
33	60	Kim Dong-woo	South Korea	1:24.02	56	53.02	31	2:17.04	+10.52
34	57	Yuri Danilochkin	Belarus	1:22.78	48	55.94	35	2:18.72	+12.20
35	59	Márton Kékesi	Hungary	1:26.08	62	53.94	33	2:20.02	+13.50
36	28	Jared Goldberg	United States	1:20.02	9	1:02.86	37	2:22.88	+16.36
37	61	Albin Tahiri	Kosovo	1:23.84	55	59.56	36	2:23.40	+16.88
	9	Peter Fill	Italy	1:19.92	6	DNF	—N/a		
	10	Dominik Paris	Italy	1:20.01	8	DNF	—N/a		
	11	Matthias Mayer	Austria	1:19.37	3	DNF	—N/a		
	15	Justin Murisier	Switzerland	1:21.58	30	DNF	—N/a		
	18	Martin Čater	Slovenia	1:20.57	13	DNF	—N/a		
	20	Vincent Kriechmayr	Austria	1:19.96	7	DNF	—N/a		
	22	Maxence Muzaton	France	1:20.58	14	DNF	—N/a		
	31	Linus Straßer	Germany	1:22.03	39	DNF	—N/a		
	36	Marco Pfiffner	Liechtenstein	1:22.54	44	DNF	—N/a		
	39	Jan Zabystřan	Czech Republic	1:23.65	54	DNF	—N/a		
	43	Sebastian-Foss Solevåg	Norway	1:24.35	58	DNF	—N/a		
	46	Filip Forejtek	Czech Republic	1:22.56	45	DNF	—N/a		
	48	Michał Kłusak	Poland	1:22.64	46	DNF	—N/a		
	55	Matej Falat	Slovakia	1:23.21	53	DNF	—N/a		
	56	Ivan Kovbasnyuk	Ukraine	1:24.21	57	DNF	—N/a		
	62	Simon Breitfuss Kammerlander	Bolivia	1:22.94	49	DNF	—N/a		
	63	Patrick McMillan	Ireland	1:25.77	61	DNF	—N/a		
	53	Marko Stevović	Serbia	1:24.47	59	DSQ	—N/a		
	8	Aksel Lund Svindal	Norway	1:19.31	2	DNS	—N/a		
	26	Boštjan Kline	Slovenia	1:22.42	43	DNS	—N/a		
	42	Henrik von Appen	Chile	1:21.16	22	DNS	—N/a		
	44	Josef Ferstl	Germany	1:21.95	36	DNS	—N/a		
	45	Andreas Sander	Germany	1:21.68	32	DNS	—N/a		
	58	Christopher Hörl	Moldova	1:22.25	41	DNS	—N/a		
	64	Benjamin Thomsen	Canada	1:21.36	26	DNS	—N/a		
	3	Pavel Trikhichev	Olympic Athletes from Russia	DNF	—N/a				
	4	Ryan Cochran-Siegle	United States	DNF	—N/a				
	65	Manuel Osborne-Paradis	Canada	DNF	—N/a				
