= Andorra at the 1994 Winter Olympics =

- IOC code: AND
- NOC: Andorran Olympic Committee
- Website: (in Catalan)

in Lillehammer
- Competitors: 6 in 1 sport
- Flag bearer: Vicky Grau
- Medals: Gold 0 Silver 0 Bronze 0 Total 0

Winter Olympics appearances (overview)
- 1976; 1980; 1984; 1988; 1992; 1994; 1998; 2002; 2006; 2010; 2014; 2018; 2022; 2026

Andorra competed at the 1994 Winter Olympics in Lillehammer, Norway.

== Competitors ==
The following is the list of number of competitors in the Games.

| Sport | Men | Women | Total |
|---|---|---|---|
| Alpine skiing | 4 | 2 | 6 |
| Total | 4 | 2 | 6 |

== Alpine skiing ==
Men

| Athlete | Event | Run 1 (DH) | | Run 2 (Sl) | | Run 3 (Sl) | | Final/Total | | |
| Athlete | Event | Time | Rank | Time | Rank | Time | Rank | Time | Diff | Rank |
|---|---|---|---|---|---|---|---|---|---|---|
| Gerard Escoda | Super-G | —N/a | | | | | | 1:38.77 | +6.24 | 44 |
| Gerard Escoda | Giant slalom | Did not finish | | | | —N/a | | Did not finish | | |
| Gerard Escoda | Slalom | 1:03.45 | 17 | Did not finish | | —N/a | | Did not finish | | |
| Gerard Escoda | Combined | 54.22 | 25 | Did not finish | | —N/a | | Did not finish | | |
| Victor Gómez | Super-G | —N/a | | | | | | 1:38.64 | +6.11 | 43 |
| Victor Gómez | Giant slalom | Did not finish | | | | | | | | |
| Santi López | Super-G | —N/a | | | | | | Did not finish | | |
| Ramon Rossell | Super-G | —N/a | | | | | | 1:40.25 | +7.72 | 46 |

Women

| Athlete | Event | Run 1 (DH) | | Run 2 (Sl) | | Run 3 (Sl) | | Final/Total | | |
| Athlete | Event | Time | Rank | Time | Rank | Time | Rank | Time | Diff | Rank |
|---|---|---|---|---|---|---|---|---|---|---|
| Vicky Grau | Super-G | —N/a | | | | | | 1:26.39 | +4.24 | 36 |
| Vicky Grau | Giant slalom | 1:26.05 | 32 | Did not finish | | —N/a | | Did not finish | | |
| Vicky Grau | Slalom | Did not finish | | | | —N/a | | Did not finish | | |
| Caroline Poussier | Giant slalom | Did not finish | | | | —N/a | | Did not finish | | |
| Caroline Poussier | Slalom | 1:04.46 | 31 | 1:02.36 | 24 | —N/a | | 2:06.82 | +10.81 | 24 |
