= Andorra at the 1998 Winter Olympics =

- IOC code: AND
- NOC: Andorran Olympic Committee
- Website: (in Catalan)

in Nagano
- Competitors: 3 (2 men, 1 woman) in 1 sport
- Flag bearer: Victor Gómez
- Medals: Gold 0 Silver 0 Bronze 0 Total 0

Winter Olympics appearances (overview)
- 1976; 1980; 1984; 1988; 1992; 1994; 1998; 2002; 2006; 2010; 2014; 2018; 2022; 2026; 2030

Andorra competed at the 1998 Winter Olympics in Nagano, Japan.

== Competitors ==
The following is the list of number of competitors in the Games.

| Sport | Men | Women | Total |
|---|---|---|---|
| Alpine skiing | 2 | 1 | 3 |
| Total | 2 | 1 | 3 |

== Alpine skiing ==
Men

| Athlete | Event | Race 1 | Race 2 | Total | |
| Athlete | Event | Time | Time | Time | Rank |
|---|---|---|---|---|---|
| Victor Gómez | Super-G | | | DNF | – |
| Gerard Escoda | Giant Slalom | 1:25.23 | DNF | DNF | – |
| Victor Gómez | Giant Slalom | 1:25.07 | DNF | DNF | – |
| Victor Gómez | Slalom | DNF | – | DNF | – |
| Gerard Escoda | Slalom | DNF | – | DNF | – |

Women

| Athlete | Event | Race 1 | Race 2 | Total | |
| Athlete | Event | Time | Time | Time | Rank |
|---|---|---|---|---|---|
| Vicky Grau | Giant Slalom | DNF | – | DNF | – |
| Vicky Grau | Slalom | 48.41 | 49.28 | 1:37.69 | 19 |
