= Andorra at the 1988 Winter Olympics =

- IOC code: AND
- NOC: Andorran Olympic Committee
- Website: (in Catalan)

in Calgary
- Competitors: 4 (2 men, 2 women) in 1 sport
- Flag bearer: Claudina Rossel (alpine skiing)
- Medals: Gold 0 Silver 0 Bronze 0 Total 0

Winter Olympics appearances (overview)
- 1976; 1980; 1984; 1988; 1992; 1994; 1998; 2002; 2006; 2010; 2014; 2018; 2022; 2026; 2030

Andorra competed at the 1988 Winter Olympics in Calgary, Alberta, Canada.

== Competitors ==
The following is the list of number of competitors in the Games.

Sport	Men	Women	Total
Alpine skiing	2	2	4
Total	2	2	4

== Alpine skiing ==
Men

Athlete	Event	Race 1	Race 2	Total	
Athlete	Event	Time	Time	Time	Rank
Gerard Escoda	Super-G			DNF	–
Nahum Orobitg	Super-G			1:53.22	38
Gerard Escoda	Giant Slalom	1:13.84	DSQ	DSQ	–
Gerrard Escoda	Slalom	DNF	–	DNF	–

Women

Athlete	Event	Race 1	Race 2	Total	
Athlete	Event	Time	Time	Time	Rank
Sandra Grau	Super-G			1:33.65	40
Claudina Rossel	Super-G			1:30.78	38
Sandra Grau	Giant Slalom	1:10.01	1:19.22	2:29.23	26
Claudina Rossel	Giant Slalom	1:06.16	DNF	DNF	–
Sandra Grau	Slalom	1:00.09	58.35	1:58.44	23
