= Serbia at the 2018 Winter Olympics =

- Flag of Serbia
- IOC code: SRB
- NOC: Olympic Committee of Serbia
- Website: www.oks.org.rs (in Serbian)

in Pyeongchang, South Korea 9–25 February 2018
- Competitors: 4 (3 men and 1 woman) in 2 sports
- Flag bearer: Nevena Ignjatović
- Medals: Gold 0 Silver 0 Bronze 0 Total 0

Winter Olympics appearances (overview)
- 2010; 2014; 2018; 2022; 2026; 2030

Other related appearances
- Yugoslavia (1924–1992); Serbia and Montenegro (1998–2006)

Serbia competed at the 2018 Winter Olympics in Pyeongchang, South Korea, from 9 to 25 February 2018, with four competitors in two sports.

== Competitors ==
The following is the list of number of competitors participating in the Serbian delegation per sport.

Sport	Men	Women	Total
Alpine skiing	2	1	3
Cross-country skiing	1	0	1
Total	3	1	4

== Alpine skiing ==
Serbia qualified three athletes, two male and one female.

Athlete	Event	Run 1		Run 2		Total	
Athlete	Event	Time	Rank	Time	Rank	Time	Rank
Marko Stevović	Men's combined	1:24.47	59	DSQ			
Marko Stevović	Men's downhill	—				1:49.50	51
Marko Stevović	Men's giant slalom	1:17.42	57	1:15.79	42	2:33.21	45
Marko Stevović	Men's slalom	DNF					
Marko Stevović	Men's super-G	—				1:31.70	46
Marko Vukićević	Men's combined	1:21.31	24	50.43	27	2:11.74	25
Marko Vukićević	Men's downhill	—				1:45.36	41
Marko Vukićević	Men's giant slalom	1:14.64	46	1:16.71	48	2:31.35	41
Marko Vukićević	Men's slalom	DNF					
Marko Vukićević	Men's super-G	—				DNF	
Nevena Ignjatović	Women's combined	1:42.88	16	42.23	10	2:25.11	14
Nevena Ignjatović	Women's giant slalom	1:14.41	27	1:10.99	25	2:25.40	26
Nevena Ignjatović	Women's slalom	52.10	27	51.38	26	1:43.48	26

== Cross-country skiing ==
Serbia qualified one male athlete.

Distance

Athlete	Event	Final		
Athlete	Event	Time	Deficit	Rank
Damir Rastić	Men's 15 km freestyle	37:47.5	+4:03.6	68

Sprint

Athlete	Event	Qualification		Quarterfinal		Semifinal		Final	
Athlete	Event	Time	Rank	Time	Rank	Time	Rank	Time	Rank
Damir Rastić	Men's sprint	3:50.65	75	Did not advance					

== See also ==
- Serbia at the 2018 Summer Youth Olympics
