= Marc Oliveras =

Andorran alpine skier (born 1991)

Personal information
- Full name: Marc Oliveras Gabarre
- Born: 20 December 1991 (age 34) Barcelona, Spain
- Height: 5 ft 8 in (173 cm)
- Weight: 165 lb (75 kg)

Sport
- Country: Andorra
- Sport: Alpine skiing
Medal record
Men's alpine skiing
Representing Andorra
Winter Universiade
Silver medal – second place	2015 Granada	Super-G

Marc Oliveras Gabarre (Note: In this Catalan name, the first or paternal surname is Olivera and the second or maternal family name is Gabarre; both are generally joined by the conjunction "i".) (born 20 December 1991, in Barcelona) is an alpine skier who competes for Andorra. He competed for Andorra at the FIS Alpine World Ski Championships in 2013 and 2015 and competed for Andorra at the 2014 Winter Olympics and in the 2015 Winter Universiade.

== Career ==
He competed for Andorra at the FIS Alpine World Ski Championships 2013 in Schladming, Italy. He finished 27th in the Super Combined and 43rd in the Downhill. He failed to finish in the Super-G and the Giant Slalom. He competed for Andorra at the 2014 Winter Olympics. He finished 34th in the Super-G, finished 31st in the Combined, finished 38th in the Giant Slalom and 40th in the Downhill. At the 2015 Winter Universiade he won the first medal for the country at the event a silver medal in the Super-G.

== Achievements ==
=== Winter Universiade ===
Championships	Competition	Time	Result	Winner
(Spain) / (Slovakia) Granada/Štrbské Pleso 2015	Super-G	1:23.75	2	(Italy) Michelangelo Tentori
(Spain) / (Slovakia) Granada/Štrbské Pleso 2015	Combined	–	DNF	(Switzerland) Sandro Boner

=== Winter Olympics ===
Championships	Competition	Time	Result	Winner
(Russia) Sochi 2014	Downhill	2:12.76	40	(Austria) Matthias Mayer
(Russia) Sochi 2014	Super-G	1:22.02	34	(Norway) Kjetil Jansrud
(Russia) Sochi 2014	Giant Slalom	2:53.74	38	(United States) Ted Ligety
(Russia) Sochi 2014	Combined	2:58.54	31	(Switzerland) Sandro Viletta
(South Korea) Pyeongchang 2018	Downhill	–	DNF	(Norway) Aksel Lund Svindal
(South Korea) Pyeongchang 2018	Super-G	1:27.84	33	(Austria) Matthias Mayer
(South Korea) Pyeongchang 2018	Combined	1:21.67	29	(Austria) Marcel Hirscher

=== World Championships ===
Championships	Competition	Time	Result	Winner
(Austria) Schladming 2013	Downhill	2:07.73	43	(Norway) Aksel Lund Svindal
(Austria) Schladming 2013	Super-G	–	DNF	(United States) Ted Ligety
(Austria) Schladming 2013	Giant Slalom	–	DNF	(United States) Ted Ligety
(Austria) Schladming 2013	Super Combined	3:15.68	27	(United States) Ted Ligety
