= Andorra at the 2002 Winter Olympics =

- IOC code: AND
- NOC: Andorran Olympic Committee

in Salt Lake City
- Competitors: 3 (2 men, 1 woman) in 1 sport
- Flag bearer: Victor Gómez
- Medals: Gold 0 Silver 0 Bronze 0 Total 0

Winter Olympics appearances (overview)
- 1976; 1980; 1984; 1988; 1992; 1994; 1998; 2002; 2006; 2010; 2014; 2018; 2022; 2026; 2030

Andorra sent a delegation to compete at the 2002 Winter Olympics in Salt Lake City, United States from 8–24 February 2002. This was Andorra's seventh consecutive appearance at a Winter Olympic Games. The Andorran delegation consisted of three alpine skiers; Victor Gómez, Alex Antor, and Vicky Grau. Their best performance in any event was 24th place by Grau in the women's slalom.

== Background ==
The Andorran Olympic Committee was recognized by the International Olympic Committee on 31 December 1974. They first participated in Olympic competition at the 1976 Winter Olympics and have taken part in every Summer and Winter Olympics since. This was Andorra's seventh consecutive appearance at a Winter Olympics. Andorra had never won a medal in either the Summer or Winter Olympics. The 2002 Winter Olympics were held from 8–24 February 2002; a total of 2,399 athletes took part representing 77 National Olympic Committees. The Andorran delegation to Salt Lake City consisted of three alpine skiers; Victor Gómez, Alex Antor, and Vicky Grau. Gómez was selected as the flag bearer for the opening ceremony and for the closing ceremony.

== Alpine skiing ==
Victor Gómez was 27 years old at the time of the Salt Lake City Olympics, and was a veteran of the Albertville, Lillehammer, and Nagano Winter Olympics. Vicky Grau was 26 years old, and had also participated in all three of those Olympics with her compatriot Gómez. Alex Antor was 22 years old, and making his Olympic debut. He would later represent Andorra again at the 2006 Winter Olympics in Turin.

Grau competed in two races, the women's slalom and the women's giant slalom. First for her, on 20 February, was the slalom. She posted run times of 58.13 seconds and a faster second run of 57.03 seconds. Her combined time was 1 minute and 55.16 seconds, which placed her 24th out of 38 competitors who finished both legs of the race, the gold medal was won by Janica Kostelić of Croatia in a time of 1 minute and 46.10 seconds, the silve rmedal was won by Laure Pequegnot of France, and the bronze by Anja Pärson of Sweden. Two days later she participated in the giant slalom, finishing her first leg in a time of 1 minute and 21.24 seconds. She did not finish the second run, and therefore went unranked for the event; the gold medal was again won by Kostelić, the silver medal by Pärson, and the bronze was taken by Sonja Nef of Switzerland.

On 21 February, both Gómez and Antor took part in the men's giant slalom. Gómez finished the first run in 1 minute and 17.83 seconds and the second in 1 minute and 15.50 seconds. He finished in 39th place with a time of 2 minutes and 33.33 seconds. Antor was a little faster, he completed his first run in 1 minute and 16.66 seconds and his second in 1 minute and 14.73 seconds. His total time was 2 minutes and 31.39 seconds, which was enough for 36th place, out of 57 classified finishers. The gold medal in the giant slalom was won by Stephan Eberharter of Austria in a time of 2 minutes and 23.28 seconds, the silver medal was won by Bode Miller of the United States, and the bronze by Lasse Kjus of Norway. On 23 February, Antor participated in the men's slalom, finishing the first leg in 54.57 seconds. However, he did not finish the second leg, and was eliminated from the event. In the slalom, the gold medal was won by Jean-Pierre Vidal and the silver by Sébastien Amiez, both Frenchmen, and the bronze was taken by Benjamin Raich of Austria.

Athlete	Event	Race 1	Race 2	Total	
Athlete	Event	Time	Time	Time	Rank
Victor Gómez	Men's giant slalom	1:17.83	1:15.50	2:33.33	39
Alex Antor	Men's giant slalom	1:16.66	1:14.73	2:31.39	36
Alex Antor	Men's slalom	54.57	DNF	DNF	–
Vicky Grau	Women's giant slalom	1:21.24	DNF	DNF	–
Vicky Grau	Women's slalom	58.13	57.03	1:55.16	24

== See also ==
- Andorra at the 2002 Winter Paralympics
