= Beat Feuz =

Swiss alpine skier

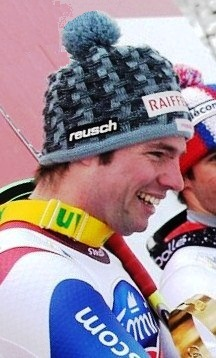
- Feuz in 2012

Personal information
- Born: 11 February 1987 (age 39) Schangnau, Bern, Switzerland
- Height: 1.72 m (5 ft 8 in)
- Website: beat-feuz.ch

Skiing career
- Sport: Alpine skiing
- Club: Schangnau
- Retired: April 2023 (age 36)
- Disciplines: Downhill, super-G, combined
- World Cup debut: 10 December 2006 (age 19)

Olympics
- Teams: 3 – (2014, 2018, 2022)
- Medals: 3 (1 gold)

World Championships
- Teams: 5 – (2011, 2015–21)
- Medals: 3 (1 gold)

World Cup
- Seasons: 14 – (2007, 2010–2012, 2014–2023)
- Wins: 16 – (13 DH, 3 SG)
- Podiums: 59 – (47 DH, 8 SG, 4 AC)
- Overall titles: 0 – (2nd in 2012)
- Discipline titles: 4 – (4 DH: 2018–2021)
Medal record
Men's alpine skiing
Representing Switzerland
International alpine ski competitions
Event	1st	2nd	3rd
Olympic Games	1	1	1
World Championships	1	0	2
Total	2	1	3
World Cup race podiums
Event	1st	2nd	3rd
Super-G	3	1	4
Downhill	13	18	16
Combined	0	3	1
Total	16	22	21
Olympic Games
Gold medal – first place	2022 Beijing	Downhill
Silver medal – second place	2018 Pyeongchang	Super-G
Bronze medal – third place	2018 Pyeongchang	Downhill
World Championships
Gold medal – first place	2017 St. Moritz	Downhill
Bronze medal – third place	2015 Beaver Creek	Downhill
Bronze medal – third place	2021 Cortina d’Ampezzo	Downhill
Junior World Championships
Gold medal – first place	2007 Altenmarkt	Downhill
Gold medal – first place	2007 Altenmarkt	Super-G
Gold medal – first place	2007 Altenmarkt	Combined
Bronze medal – third place	2005 Bardonecchia	Slalom
Bronze medal – third place	2007 Altenmarkt	Slalom

Beat Feuz (German pronunciation: [ˈbe.at ˈfɔɪts]; born 11 February 1987) is a Swiss former World Cup alpine ski racer, specializing in the speed events of downhill and super-G. He is 2017 World champion and 2022 Olympic champion in downhill. In 2021, he won consecutive downhills on the famed Streif at Kitzbühel.

== Racing career ==
Born in Schangnau in the canton of Bern, Feuz made his World Cup debut at age 19 in December 2006 but missed all of the 2008 and 2009 seasons due to torn ligaments in his left knee. He secured his first two World Cup podia in March 2011, both in downhills at Kvitfjell, Norway. The first victory was backed up with a third-place finish the following day.

At his first World Championships in 2011 in Garmisch, Germany, Feuz finished ninth in the downhill. In the super combined, he finished second in the downhill portion but missed a gate near the finish of the slalom course. He also competed in the team event for Switzerland, which lost to Sweden in the quarterfinals.

=== 2012 ===
Feuz carried this positive momentum into the start of the 2012 season, with four podia by mid-December. In North America, he placed second in the first downhill of the season at Lake Louise, 0.06 seconds behind Swiss teammate Didier Cuche. Feuz attained two podiums in Beaver Creek and then back in Europe, won his second World Cup event and his first in super-G at Val Gardena (Gröden), Italy.

Just miles from his hometown in January, he placed second in the super combined at Wengen; he had an advantage of 2.96 seconds over Ivica Kostelić after the downhill portion but lost it on bad slalom and finished 0.20 seconds behind Kostelić. Feuz won the classic Lauberhorn downhill the next day.

In February, he won the pre-Olympic downhill in Russia at Rosa Khutor, the alpine racing venue for the 2014 Winter Olympics. A breakout season for Feuz, he had 13 World Cup podiums with four victories; in the final standings, he was runner-up in the overall, downhill, and combined, and third in Super-G.

=== Out for 2013 ===
Feuz changed equipment from Salomon to Head after the 2012 season, but it was later revealed that he was suffering from inflammation and bleeding in his left knee and would miss the whole 2013 season. The knee was re-injured at the pre-Olympic races in Russia in February 2012, and was operated on after the season in March for bone fragments. He re-aggravated it during training in Argentina in August and was sent home for evaluation.

=== Return in 2014 ===
Feuz returned to the World Cup circuit for the 2014 season and claimed sixth place in the downhill at Beaver Creek in his third race back. This was Feuz's best result of the season, as he still appeared to be struggling with his knee injury. Feuz no longer entered giant slalom races, and his ability in slalom was diminished so that he could no longer contend in the super combined races, not even entering the Kitzbühel combined competition, a race in which he had previously finished on the podium. Feuz was selected for the Swiss Olympic team and raced the downhill, Super-G, and super combined, and his best result was a 13th in the downhill. His 2014 season indicated that he wasn't fully healed; he did not qualify for the season-ending World Cup finals.

=== Return to top positions in 2015 ===
Feuz started the 2015 season brightly, taking sixth in the opening downhill in Canada at Lake Louise. The breakthrough result came in the next downhill as Feuz was runner-up in the Birds of Prey for the second time in his career. After the event, through an interpreter, Feuz said, "my knee will never be 100 percent again," and that for him, his comeback story was "almost bigger than I can imagine; it's almost too much." The lasting effects of the knee injury were clear though, Feuz didn't manage better than 17th in the first four Super-G races of the season, and he still wasn't entering Giant slalom races as he had done previously. Feuz backed up his result in Beaver Creek with a second runner-up placing, this time at his home downhill in Wengen.

The podium results in downhill were enough to book Feuz a ticket to the 2015 World Championships, held on the Birds of Prey hill on which he had twice been on the podium in his career. Feuz was left out of the Swiss squad for the Super-G in favour of Mauro Caviezel, but in the downhill, he led the race for much of the way. He finished third, behind teammate Patrick Küng and American Travis Ganong, and gained his first major championship medal. In the super combined the next day, Feuz produced another stellar downhill run, in second by a narrow margin. Feuz was forced to ski in warm conditions on a rutted course in the slalom run. This, together with the deterioration of Feuz's technical skiing after his knee injury, meant Feuz blew a lead of over 3 seconds on gold-medalist Marcel Hirscher. Feuz didn't finish the year particularly strongly, with his best results being two 9th places at the World Cup Finals in Méribel.

=== 2016 ===
Once again, injury problems were to spoil things for Feuz, who sustained an Achilles injury straddling a gate during training in South America. He was expected to miss at least the first few races of the season. Later however, it was revealed that Feuz was targeting a comeback in time for his home races in Wengen. Feuz skied the downhill leg of the Wengen combined and elected to start the downhill the next day, earning a respectable 11th place in his first race back. Moving on to Kitzbühel, and still taking the training runs and races on a day-to-day basis, having earned another solid result of 16th in the Super-G, Feuz elected to race the downhill the next day; his best previous finish on the Streif downhill course was sixth. In only his third full race since his return, Feuz was the runner-up in a race full of high-profile crashes. Feuz went on to claim two 3rd and two 5th places in the following four downhills, qualifying him comfortably for the World Cup finals to be held on the Corviglia piste in St. Moritz, significant as this was the venue for the following year's World Championships. Feuz gave what was to turn out to be a sign of things to come, as he claimed victory in the downhill and the win in the Super-G the following day. The wins were his first in just over four years. The downhill victory meant he finished 5th in the downhill standings for 2016 and only 48 points off the winner Peter Fill, despite missing 4 of the 11 races.

=== World Champion in 2017 ===
The 2017 World Cup season would break off in February for the main event of the year – the 2017 World Championships in his home country in St. Moritz. Feuz didn't produce amazing results to start the year, not helped by the cancellation of two of his favourite races at Beaver Creek and Wengen. Feuz only managed one top-10 result in his first six races of the year. In Kitzbühel, the signs became clear Feuz was coming into form for the World Championships. A 3rd place in the Super-G was followed the next day in the downhill by a fall on the Traverse, with Feuz having led eventual winner Dominik Paris by 0.72 seconds entering the section. Fortunately, Feuz escaped from the netting unharmed and claimed another podium at Garmisch in his final race before the World Championships.

Feuz entered the World Championships with high expectations from the Swiss ski fans thanks to his performance on the track at the World Cup finals the previous year, and this was only increased when Feuz won the only training run he started fairly comfortably, despite normally not pushing too hard in the training runs. Feuz came 12th in the Super-G but, like the rest of the athletes, was forced to wait an extra day for the downhill to take place thanks to the weather. On what was dubbed ″Downhill Super Sunday″ due to the fact both the men's and women's downhills would take place on the same day, the early runners in the men's race were hampered more than a little by fog on the upper section. Feuz had chosen bib 13, and the lead changed hands several times with the racers before him as the course appeared to be quickening up as the fog lifted. Although slightly behind on the top gliding section, Feuz was excellent on the jumps and turns in the middle part of the course, and although Feuz appeared to get slightly late on the critical Felsen section, he managed to carry the speed through it and went on to take the lead by 0.39 seconds at that point. A nervous wait followed as nearly every remaining top racer beat Feuz's time at the top of the course. The closest to Feuz on the day was Erik Guay, who was leading by 0.04 seconds at the penultimate split time but couldn't match Feuz through Felsen and dropped back to 0.42 behind. Nonetheless, the Canadian managed to make up 0.3 of a second from that intermediate to the finish. Feuz, therefore, claimed the gold medal by 0.12 seconds to live up to his tag as the favourite for the race and make it back-to-back World downhill golds for the Swiss men's team. Feuz claimed one more podium finish in 2017 in the second downhill in Kvitfjell, helping him to finish 4th in the downhill standings for 2017.

=== 2018 ===
Feuz began the Olympic year in the best possible way by claiming victory in the opening downhill in Lake Louise, his first win on the course and his first podium there since 2011. He won silver for Super-G and bronze for Downhill.

=== 2021 ===
Feuz won the Streif two times in a row in the same year; there was an extra race on Friday, as well as the usual Saturday (which was moved to Sunday due to weather conditions), because of a cancelled race due to the COVID-19 pandemic.

=== 2022 ===
Feuz won a downhill gold medal at the Winter Olympics in Beijing after the race was delayed for a day due to strong winds at the Yanqing venue.

In January 2023, Feuz retired from competitions.

== World Cup results ==
=== Season titles ===
- 4 titles – (4 Downhill)

Season	Discipline
2018	Downhill
2019	Downhill
2020	Downhill
2021	Downhill

=== Season standings ===
Season	Age	Overall	Slalom	Giant Slalom	Super-G	Downhill	Combined
2007	20	118	—	—	52	46	—
2008	21	injured: out for two seasons					
2009	22	injured: out for two seasons					
2010	23	73	—	—	53	41	18
2011	24	22	—	—	34	7	14
2012	25	2	—	34	3	2	2
2013	26	injured: out for season					
2014	27	50	—	—	28	27	28
2015	28	19	—	—	22	7	23
2016	29	13	—	—	12	5	—
2017	30	11	—	—	8	4	43
2018	31	5	—	—	9	1	—
2019	32	6	—	—	12	1	—
2020	33	6	—	—	11	1	—
2021	34	9	—	—	12	1	—N/a
2022	35	6	—	—	6	2	—N/a
2023	36	36	—	—	33	14	—N/a

=== Race victories ===
	Total	Slalom	Giant slalom	Super-G	Downhill	Combined	Parallel
Wins	16	—	—	3	13	—	—
Podiums	59	—	—	8	47	4	—

Season
Season	Date	Location	Discipline
2011	11 March 2011	Kvitfjell, Norway	Downhill
2012	16 December 2011	Val Gardena, Italy	Super-G
2012	14 January 2012	Wengen, Switzerland	Downhill
2012	11 February 2012	Rosa Khutor, Russia	Downhill
2012	2 March 2012	Kvitfjell, Norway	Super-G
2016	16 March 2016	St. Moritz, Switzerland	Downhill
2016	17 March 2016	St. Moritz, Switzerland	Super-G
2018	25 November 2017	Lake Louise, Canada	Downhill
2018	13 January 2018	Wengen, Switzerland	Downhill
2018	27 January 2018	Garmisch-Partenkirchen, Germany	Downhill
2019	30 December 2018	(United States) Beaver Creek, USA	Downhill
2020	7 December 2019	(United States) Beaver Creek, USA	Downhill
2020	18 January 2020	Wengen, Switzerland	Downhill
2021	22 January 2021	Kitzbühel, Austria	Downhill
2021	24 January 2021	Kitzbühel, Austria	Downhill
2022	23 January 2022	Kitzbühel, Austria	Downhill

== World Championship results ==
Year	Age	Slalom	Giant slalom	Super-G	Downhill	Combined
2011	24	—	—	—	9	DNF2
2015	28	—	—	—	3	14
2017	30	—	—	12	1	—
2019	32	—	—	18	4	—
2021	34	—	—	10	3	—

== Olympic results ==
Year	Age	Slalom	Giant slalom	Super-G	Downhill	Combined
2014	27	—	—	27	13	15
2018	31	—	—	2	3	—
2022	35	—	—	DNF	1	—
