= Joan Verdú =

Joan Verdú may refer to:

- Joan Verdú (footballer) (born 1983), Spanish footballer
- Joan Verdú (alpine skier) (born 1995), Andorran alpine skier
