= Andorra at the 2022 Winter Olympics =

- Flag of Andorra
- IOC code: AND
- NOC: Andorran Olympic Committee
- Website: www.coa.ad (in Catalan)

in Beijing, China 4–20 February 2022
- Competitors: 5 (2 men and 3 women) in 3 sports
- Flag bearer (opening): Maeva Estevez
- Flag bearer (closing): Volunteer
- Medals: Gold 0 Silver 0 Bronze 0 Total 0

Winter Olympics appearances (overview)
- 1976; 1980; 1984; 1988; 1992; 1994; 1998; 2002; 2006; 2010; 2014; 2018; 2022; 2026

Andorra competed at the 2022 Winter Olympics in Beijing, China, from 4 to 20 February 2022.

On 19 January 2022, the Andorran Olympic Committee announced a team of four athletes (two per gender) competing in two sports. During the announcement, it was also announced the Andorran flag would be carried by a volunteer at the opening ceremony as the alpine skiers would not arrive till later and the cross-country skiers had competition the next day. However, two days later, snowboarder Maeva Estevez was added to the team and named as flagbearer at the opening ceremony. This increased the team size to five athletes (two men and three women). A volunteer served as the flagbearer during the closing ceremony.

== Competitors ==
The following is the list of number of competitors who participated at the Games per sport/discipline.

Sport	Men	Women	Total
Alpine skiing	1	1	2
Cross-country skiing	1	1	2
Snowboarding	0	1	1
Total	2	3	5

== Alpine skiing ==
By meeting the basic qualification standards, Andorra qualified one male and one female alpine skier.

Athlete	Event	Run 1		Run 2		Total	
Athlete	Event	Time	Rank	Time	Rank	Time	Rank
Joan Verdú	Men's giant slalom	1:04.48	13	1:06.80	3	2:11.28	9
Joan Verdú	Men's super-G	—N/a				1:22.92	22
Cande Moreno	Women's combined	1:34.05	16	1:00.29	14	2:34.34	12
Cande Moreno	Women's downhill	—N/a				DNF	
Cande Moreno	Women's super-G	—N/a				1:16.72	30

== Cross-country skiing ==
Andorra qualified two male and two female cross-country skiers, but chose to only use one quota per gender.

Due to high winds and adverse weather conditions, the men's 50 km freestyle competition on 19 February was shortened to 28.4 km.

Athlete	Event	Classical		Freestyle		Final		
Athlete	Event	Time	Rank	Time	Rank	Time	Deficit	Rank
Irineu Esteve Altimiras	Men's 15 km classical	—N/a				40:39.4	+2:44.6	24
Irineu Esteve Altimiras	Men's 30 km skiathlon	41:37.9	27	38:54.1	16	1:21:08.2	+4:58.4	20
Irineu Esteve Altimiras	Men's 50 km freestyle	—N/a				1:15:09.8	+3:37.1	25
Carola Vila	Women's 10 km classical	—N/a				31:45.0	+3:38.7	47
Carola Vila	Women's 15 km skiathlon	25:09.6	43	24:32.5	50	50:28.8	+6:15.1	47
Carola Vila	Women's 30 km freestyle	—N/a				1:39:18.1	+14:24.1	48

== Snowboarding ==
Andorra received a reallocated quota for the women's snowboard cross event.

Athlete	Event	Seeding		1/8 final	Quarterfinal	Semifinal	Final	
Athlete	Event	Time	Rank	Position	Position	Position	Position	Rank
Maeva Estevez	Women's snowboard cross	DNF	31	DNS	Did not advance			31

== See also ==
- Andorra at the 2022 Winter Paralympics
