= Thomas Dreßen =

German alpine skier

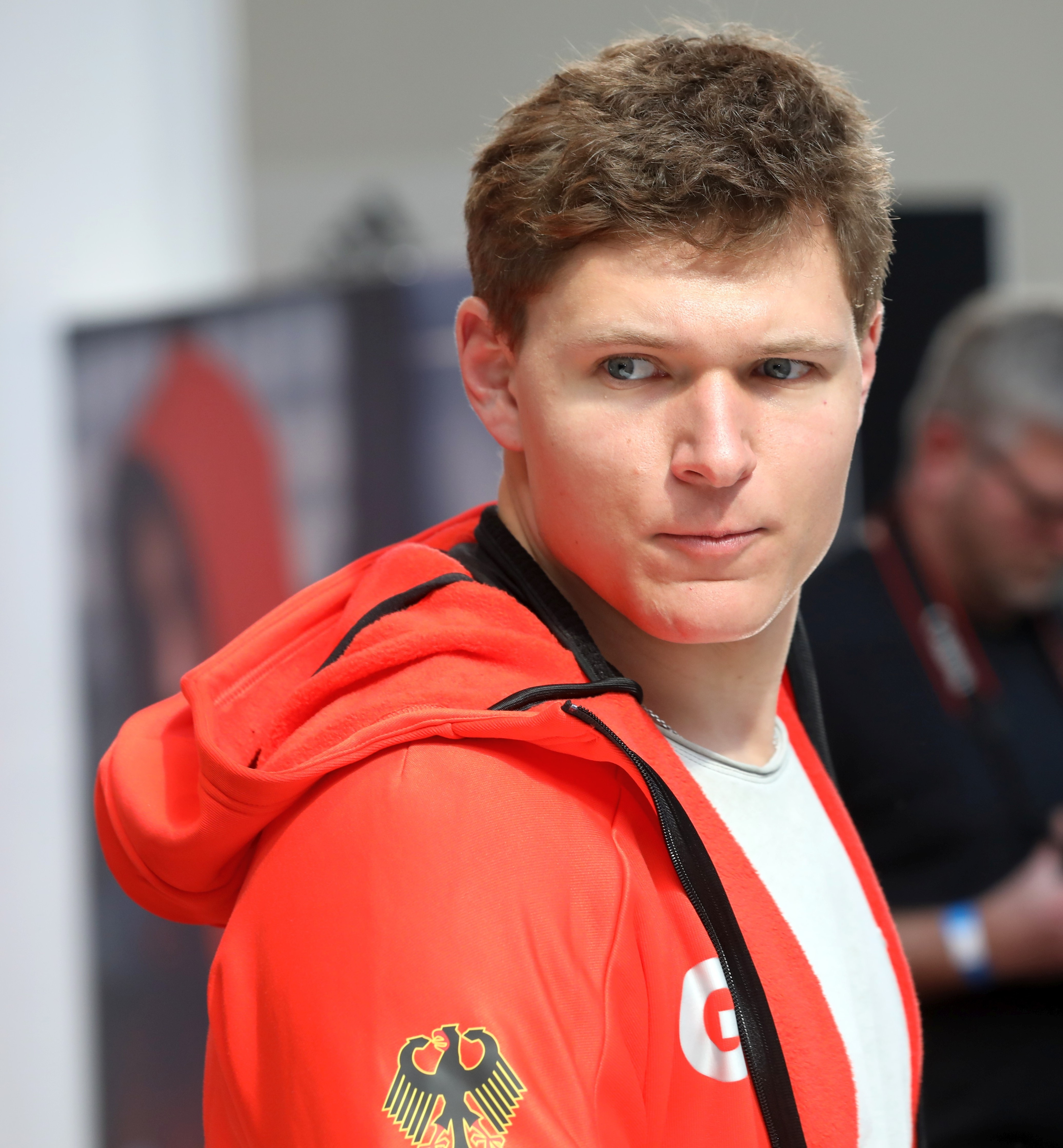
- January 2018

Personal information
- Born: 22 November 1993 (age 32) Jülich, Germany
- Height: 1.88 m (6 ft 2 in)

Skiing career
- Sport: Alpine skiing
- Club: SC Mittenwald
- Disciplines: Downhill, super-G, combined
- World Cup debut: 21 February 2015 (age 21)

Olympics
- Teams: 1 – (2018)
- Medals: 0

World Championships
- Teams: 3 – (2017, 2021, 2023)
- Medals: 0

World Cup
- Seasons: 6 – (2015–2021)
- Wins: 5 – (5 DH)
- Podiums: 10 – (7 DH, 3 SG)
- Overall titles: 0 – (8th in 2018)
- Discipline titles: 0 – (2nd in DH, 2020)
Medal record
Men's alpine skiing
Representing Germany
Junior World Ski Championships
Silver medal – second place	2012 Roccaraso	Giant slalom
Silver medal – second place	2014 Jasná	Downhill

Thomas Dreßen (born 22 November 1993) is a retired German World Cup alpine ski racer. He specializes in the speed events of downhill and super-G. Dreßen made his World Cup debut in February 2015 at the Saalbach downhill. He made his first podium in December 2017 in the downhill at Beaver Creek and his first win came the following month at Kitzbühel.

== Career ==
Dreßen made his World Cup debut at the Saalbach downhill on 21 February 2015; he finished in 39th place. He scored his first World Cup points in the Lake Louise downhill, finishing in 23rd. In November 2018, Dreßen suffered a season-ending knee injury at Beaver Creek and missed the world championships in February. Exactly a year after his injury, he won the season's first downhill at Lake Louise.

== World Cup results ==
=== Season standings ===
Season	Age	Overall	Slalom	Giant slalom	Super-G	Downhill	Combined
2016	22	109	—	—	—	43	30
2017	23	68	—	—	31	25	39
2018	24	8	—	—	11	3	8
2019	25	89	—	—	34	34	—
2020	26	9	—	—	9	2	—
2021	27	injured, out for two seasons					
2022	28	injured, out for two seasons					
2023	29	83	—	—	—	30	—N/a
2024	30	101	—	—	38	50	—N/a

Standings through 27 January 2024

=== Race podiums ===
- 5 wins – (5 DH)
- 10 podiums – (7 DH, 3 SG)

Season	Date	Location	Discipline	Place
2018	2 Dec 2017	(United States) Beaver Creek, USA	Downhill	3rd
2018	20 Jan 2018	Kitzbühel, Austria	Downhill	1st
2018	10 Mar 2018	Kvitfjell, Norway	Downhill	1st
2018	15 Mar 2018	Åre, Sweden	Super-G	3rd
2020	30 Nov 2019	Lake Louise, Canada	Downhill	1st
2020	20 Dec 2019	Val Gardena, Italy	Super-G	3rd
2020	18 Jan 2020	Wengen, Switzerland	Downhill	3rd
2020	1 Feb 2020	Garmisch-Partenkichen, Germany	Downhill	1st
2020	13 Feb 2020	Saalbach-Hinterglemm, Austria	Downhill	1st
2020	14 Feb 2020	Saalbach-Hinterglemm, Austria	Super-G	3rd

== World Championship results ==
Year	Age	Slalom	Giant slalom	Super-G	Downhill	Combined
2017	23	—	—	DNF	12	14
2021	27	—	—	—	18	—
2023	29	—	—	—	10	—

== Olympic results ==
Year	Age	Slalom	Giant slalom	Super-G	Downhill	Combined
2018	24	—	—	12	5	9
2022	28	Injured, did not compete				
