= Andorra at the 2026 Winter Olympics =

- Flag of Andorra
- IOC code: AND
- NOC: Andorran Olympic Committee
- Website: www.coa.ad (in Catalan)

in Milan and Cortina d'Ampezzo, Italy 6 February 2026 – 22 February 2026
- Competitors: 7 (3 men and 4 women) in 2 sports
- Flag bearers (opening): Joan Verdú, Cande Moreno & Irineu Esteve
- Flag bearer (closing): Volunteer
- Medals: Gold 0 Silver 0 Bronze 0 Total 0

Winter Olympics appearances (overview)
- 1976; 1980; 1984; 1988; 1992; 1994; 1998; 2002; 2006; 2010; 2014; 2018; 2022; 2026

Andorra competed at the 2026 Winter Olympics in Milan and Cortina d'Ampezzo, Italy, from 6 to 22 February 2026.

Three Andorran athletes Joan Verdú, Cande Moreno and Irineu Esteve were the country's flagbearer during the opening ceremony. Meanwhile, a volunteer was the country's flagbearer during the closing ceremony.

== Competitors ==
The following is the list of number of competitors participating at the Games per sport/discipline.

Sport	Men	Women	Total
Alpine skiing	2	3	5
Cross-country skiing	1	1	2
Total	3	4	7

== Alpine skiing ==
Andorra qualified two female and two male alpine skier.

Athlete	Event	Run 1		Run 2		Total	
Athlete	Event	Time	Rank	Time	Rank	Time	Rank
Xavier Cornella	Men's slalom	1:03.01	24	58.95	21	2:01.96	21
Joan Verdú	Men's giant slalom	1:16.69	19	1:10.60	1	2:27.29	10
Jordina Caminal Santure	Women's downhill	—N/a				1:41.34	24
Jordina Caminal Santure	Women's super-G	—N/a				DNF	
Carla Mijares Ruf	Women's slalom	DNF					
Cande Moreno	Women's downhill	—N/a				DNF	

== Cross-country skiing ==
Andorra qualified one female and one male cross-country skier through the basic quota.

Distance

Athlete	Event	Classical		Freestyle		Final		
Athlete	Event	Time	Rank	Time	Rank	Time	Deficit	Rank
Gina del Rio	Women's 20 km skiathlon	30:46.0	43	30:19.7	46	1:01:36.0	+7:50.8	44
Gina del Rio	Women's 10 km freestyle	—N/a		25:25.9	35	—N/a		

Sprint

Athlete	Event	Qualification		Quarterfinal		Semifinal		Final	
Athlete	Event	Time	Rank	Time	Rank	Time	Rank	Time	Rank
Gina del Rio	Women's sprint	3:56.85	47	Did not advance					

== See also ==
- Andorra at the 2026 Winter Paralympics
