= Andorra at the 1984 Winter Olympics =

- IOC code: AND
- NOC: Andorran Olympic Committee
- Website: (in Catalan)

in Sarajevo
- Competitors: 2 (men) in 1 sport
- Flag bearer: Albert Llovera
- Medals: Gold 0 Silver 0 Bronze 0 Total 0

Winter Olympics appearances (overview)
- 1976; 1980; 1984; 1988; 1992; 1994; 1998; 2002; 2006; 2010; 2014; 2018; 2022; 2026; 2030

Andorra competed at the 1984 Winter Olympics in Sarajevo, Yugoslavia.

== Alpine skiing ==
Men

Athlete	Event	Race 1		Race 2		Total	
Athlete	Event	Time	Rank	Time	Rank	Time	Rank
Jordi Torres	Downhill					1:59.06	50
Albert Llovera	Downhill					1:57.88	48
Albert Llovera	Giant Slalom	DNF	–	–	–	DNF	–
Jordi Torres	Giant Slalom	DNF	–	–	–	DNF	–
Jordi Torres	Slalom	DNF	–	–	–	DNF	–
Albert Llovera	Slalom	DNF	–	–	–	DNF	–
