= Joan Verdú (alpine skier) =

Andorran alpine skier (born 1995)

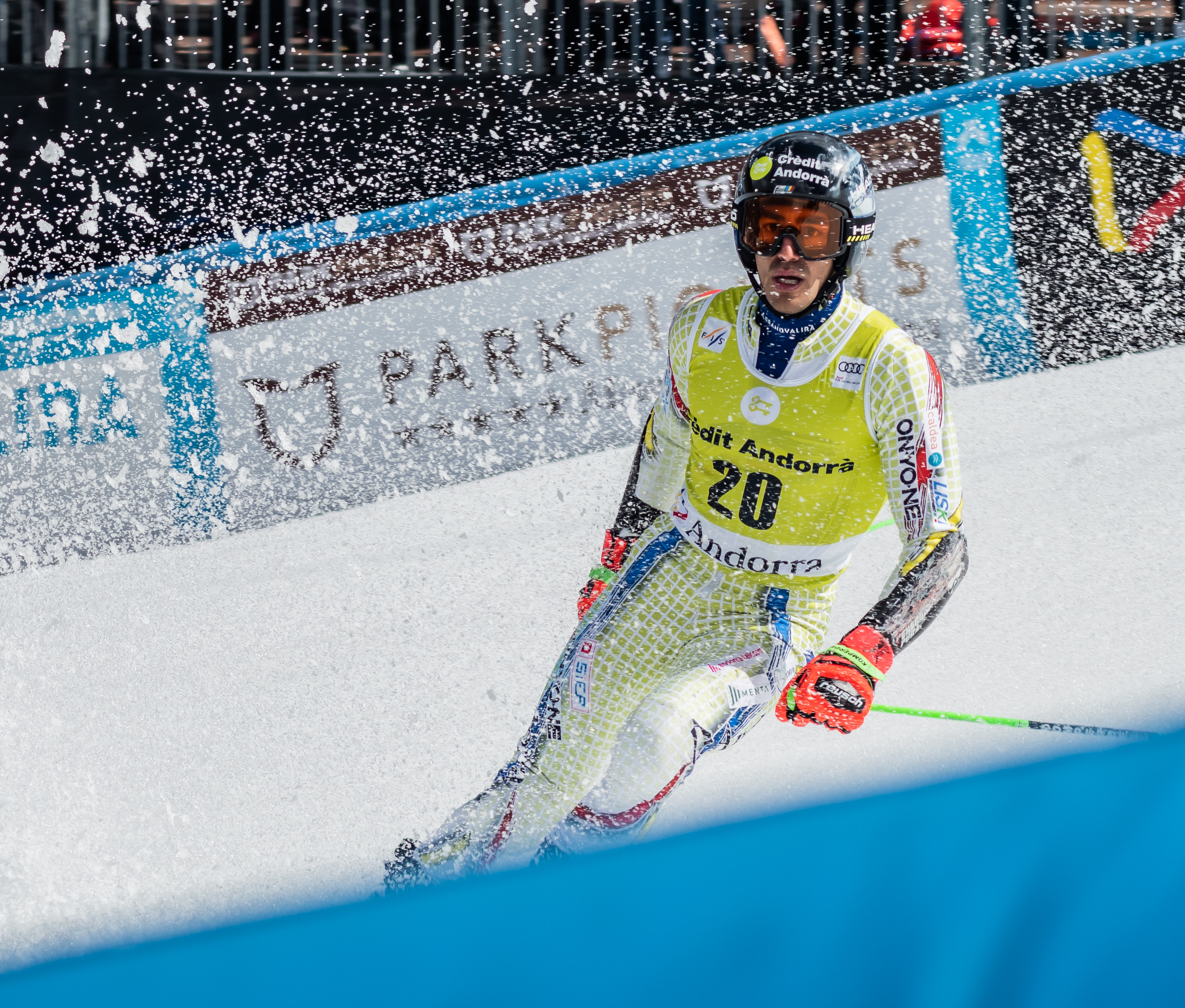
- Verdú in 2023

Personal information
- Full name: Joan Verdú Sánchez
- Nickname: La Mamba
- Born: 23 May 1995 (age 31) Andorra la Vella, Andorra

Skiing career
- Country: Andorra
- Sport: Alpine skiing
- Disciplines: Giant slalom
- World Cup debut: 23 October 2016 (age 21)

Olympics
- Teams: 4 – (2014–2026)
- Medals: 0

World Championships
- Teams: 5 – (2013, 2017, 2021–2025)
- Medals: 0

World Cup
- Seasons: 8 – (2017–2019, 2022–2026)
- Wins: 0
- Podiums: 2 – (2 GS)
- Overall titles: 0 – (39th in 2024)
- Discipline titles: 0 – (10th in GS, 2024)
Medal record
Alpine skiing
Representing Andorra
World Cup race podiums
Event	1st	2nd	3rd
Giant slalom	0	1	1
Total	0	1	1
Winter Youth Olympic Games
Bronze medal – third place	2012 Innsbruck	Super-G

Joan Verdú Sánchez (Note: In this Catalan name, the first or paternal surname is Verdú and the second or maternal family name is Sánchez; both are generally joined by the conjunction "i".) (born 23 May 1995) is an Andorran World Cup alpine ski racer who specializes in the technical events of slalom, giant slalom and super-G. He made his ski racing debut in 2010.

On 22 January 2012, Verdú finished third at the French national championships. Later that season, he finished third for boys' super-G at 2012 Winter Youth Olympics. He represented Andorra at the 2014, 2018 and 2022 Winter Olympics.

On 9 December 2023, Verdú became the first Andorran ski racer to achieve a World Cup podium. He finished third on the giant slalom in Val-d'Isère, France.

On 16 March 2024, he secured his second World Cup podium, finishing second in the giant slalom at the World Cup Finals in Saalbach, Austria.

== Personal life ==
Since August 2022, Verdú is also a YouTube content creator, with a weekly vlog about his performances on the alpine skiing circuit.

He speaks Catalan, Spanish and English fluently.

Since 2025, he has been in a relationship with Spanish influencer Laura Escanes.

== World Cup results ==
=== Season standings ===
Season
Season	Age	Overall	Slalom	Giant slalom	Super-G	Downhill	Parallel
2022	26	126	—	42	—	—	—
2023	27	68	—	19	—	—	—N/a
2024	28	39	—	10	—	—	—N/a
2025	29	55	—	18	—	—	—N/a
2026	30	83	—	26	—	—	—N/a

=== Race podiums ===
- 0 wins
- 2 podiums – (2 GS)

Season
Season	Date	Location	Discipline	Place
2024	9 December 2023	Val-d'Isère, France	Giant slalom	3rd
2024	16 March 2024	Saalbach, Austria	Giant slalom	2nd

== World Championship results ==
Year
Year	Age	Slalom	Giant slalom	Super-G	Downhill	Combined	Team combined	Parallel	Team event
2013	17	—	39	—	—	—	—N/a	—N/a	—
2017	21	DNSQ1	DNS2	DNF1	—	27	—N/a	—N/a	—
2021	25	—	DNF1	26	—	—	—N/a	—	—
2023	30	—	DNF1	—	—	—	—N/a	DNF2	—
2025	32	—	DNF2	—	—	—N/a	—	—N/a	—

== Olympic results ==
Year
Year	Age	Slalom	Giant slalom	Super-G	Downhill	Combined	Team combined	Team event
2014	18	—	DNF1	—	—	—	—N/a	—N/a
2018	22	—	DNF2	28	37	27	—N/a	—
2022	26	—	9	22	—	—	—N/a	—
2026	30	—	10	—	—	—N/a	—	—N/a

== Notes ==
Olympic Games
Preceded by Nahuel Carabaña; Mònica Dòria	Flag bearer for Andorra; Milano Cortina 2026 with Irineu Esteve Altimiras	Succeeded by Incumbent
