= Kjetil Jansrud =

Norwegian alpine skier (born 1985)

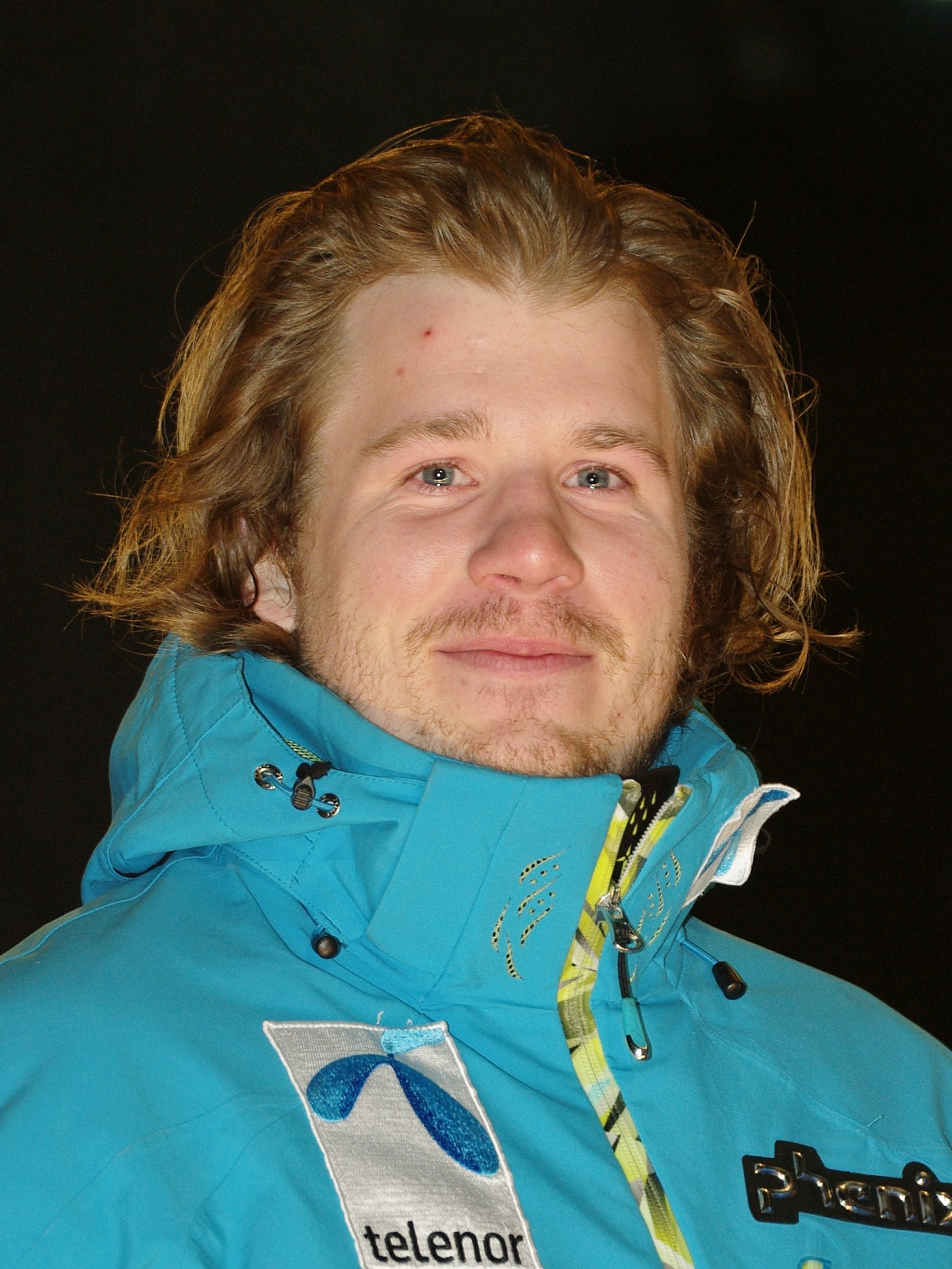
- Jansrud in February 2011

Personal information
- Born: 28 August 1985 (age 41) Stavanger, Norway
- Occupations: Alpine skier, television host
- Height: 1.83 m (6 ft 0 in) (2014)

Skiing career
- Sport: Alpine skiing
- Club: Peer Gynt Alpinklubb
- Disciplines: Downhill, super-G, giant slalom, combined
- World Cup debut: 19 January 2003 (age 17)

Olympics
- Teams: 5 – (2006–2022)
- Medals: 5 (1 gold)

World Championships
- Teams: 8 – (2005, 2009–2021)
- Medals: 3 (1 gold)

World Cup
- Seasons: 18 – (2003–2006, 2008–2021)
- Wins: 23
- Podiums: 55
- Overall titles: 0 – (2nd in 2015, 2017)
- Discipline titles: 4 – (1 DH, 3 SG)
Medal record
Men's alpine skiing
Representing Norway
World Cup race podiums
| Event | 1st | 2nd | 3rd |
|---|---|---|---|
| Slalom | 0 | 0 | 0 |
| Giant | 0 | 3 | 3 |
| Super-G | 13 | 8 | 5 |
| Downhill | 8 | 7 | 4 |
| Combined | 1 | 0 | 1 |
| Parallel | 1 | 0 | 1 |
| Total | 23 | 18 | 14 |
International alpine ski competitions
| Event | 1st | 2nd | 3rd |
|---|---|---|---|
| Olympic Games | 1 | 2 | 2 |
| World Championships | 1 | 2 | 0 |
| Total | 2 | 4 | 2 |
Olympic Games
| Gold medal – first place | 2014 Sochi | Super-G |
| Silver medal – second place | 2010 Vancouver | Giant slalom |
| Silver medal – second place | 2018 Pyeongchang | Downhill |
| Bronze medal – third place | 2014 Sochi | Downhill |
| Bronze medal – third place | 2018 Pyeongchang | Super-G |
World Championships
| Gold medal – first place | 2019 Åre | Downhill |
| Silver medal – second place | 2015 Beaver Creek | Combined |
| Silver medal – second place | 2017 St. Moritz | Super-G |
Junior World Championships
| Silver medal – second place | 2004 Maribor | Giant slalom |
| Silver medal – second place | 2005 Bardonecchia | Combined |

Kjetil Jansrud (born 28 August 1985) is a Norwegian former World Cup alpine ski racer and Olympic champion. He competed in all alpine disciplines apart from slalom, and his best event was the giant slalom where he has six World Cup podiums and an Olympic silver medal. Since 2012, he had concentrated on the speed events, where all but two of his World Cup victories had come. At the 2014 Winter Olympics in Sochi, he won the super-G and placed third in the downhill. At the World Championships in 2019 at Åre, Jansrud won gold in the downhill. Kjetil is the current host of popular tv reality show Alt for Norge.

Born in Stavanger, Jansrud hails from Vinstra in Gudbrandsdalen, about forty kilometres (25 miles) from Kvitfjell.

== Career ==
At the 2006 Winter Olympics in Turin, Jansrud finished tenth in the combined. He broke his thumb in the Olympic giant slalom which ended his 2006 season. A bulging disc discovered that September kept him out of the entire 2007 season. Jansrud made his first World Cup podium in January 2009 at Adelboden and finished ninth in the super combined in February at the World Championships.

He won the silver medal in giant slalom at the 2010 Winter Olympics at Whistler.

Jansrud won his first World Cup race in March 2012 on home snow at Kvitfjell; he made the podium in all three speed events over the weekend, capped off with a victory in the super-G on Sunday.

At the first men's race of the World Championships in 2013 at Schladming, Jansrud crashed in the super-G, but got up and skied down to the finish. It was later revealed that he tore a ligament in his left knee, ending his 2013 season.

At the Winter Olympics in 2014 at Sochi, Jansrud won gold in the super-G and bronze in the downhill at Rosa Khutor. At the first World Cup races following the games, he won two speed events at Kvitfjell.

In the 2015 season, Jansrud won seven World Cup races, and placed first in the season standings in both the Super-G and downhill disciplines. He won a silver medal at the World Championships at Beaver Creek in the combined.

Jansrud achieved four wins during the 2016 season. The following year, he won five World Cup races and placed first in super-G, second in downhill, and second in the overall season standing. He also won a silver medal at the World Championships in the super-G.

He took the silver medal in the downhill at the Winter Olympics in 2018 in Korea, 0.12 seconds behind teammate and training partner Aksel Lund Svindal, after leading most of the run. He won bronze in the super-G, for his fifth Olympic medal: a gold, two silver, and two bronze.

At the World Championships in 2019 in Sweden, Jansrud won gold in the downhill by two-hundredths of a second, edging out Svindal in his final international race.

In an interview in November 2021, Jansrud expressed that the coming season probably would be his last season at top level. Jansrud confirmed in February 2022 that the Kvitfjell race on 4 March 2022 will be his last race. He is retiring at the same course on which he won his first race in 2012.

== World Cup results ==
=== Season titles ===
4 titles: (1 Downhill, 3 Super-G)

| Season | Discipline |
|---|---|
| 2015 | Downhill |
| 2015 | Super-G |
| 2017 | Super-G |
| 2018 | Super-G |

=== Season standings ===
| Season | Age | Overall | Slalom | Giant slalom | Super-G | Downhill | Combined |
|---|---|---|---|---|---|---|---|
| 2004 | 18 | 140 | — | 53 | — | — | — |
| 2005 | 19 | 98 | 58 | 39 | — | — | — |
| 2006 | 20 | 43 | 21 | 46 | — | — | 15 |
| 2007 | 21 | injured, out for season | | | | | |
| 2008 | 22 | 111 | 53 | 47 | — | — | — |
| 2009 | 23 | 34 | — | 9 | 40 | — | — |
| 2010 | 24 | 17 | — | 7 | 28 | 47 | 10 |
| 2011 | 25 | 13 | 41 | 4 | 27 | 46 | 3 |
| 2012 | 26 | 8 | 49 | 9 | 4 | 19 | 7 |
| 2013 | 27 | 13 | — | 21 | 8 | 10 | 11 |
| 2014 | 28 | 6 | — | 29 | 2 | 4 | 13 |
| 2015 | 29 | 2 | — | 19 | 1 | 1 | 18 |
| 2016 | 30 | 4 | 33 | 20 | 2 | 4 | 3 |
| 2017 | 31 | 2 | — | 24 | 1 | 2 | 21 |
| 2018 | 32 | 4 | 43 | 45 | 1 | 7 | 2 |
| 2019 | 33 | 13 | — | 35 | 4 | 13 | 14 |
| 2020 | 34 | 8 | — | — | 5 | 9 | 7 |
| 2021 | 35 | 31 | — | — | 7 | 20 | — |
| 2022 | 36 | 110 | — | — | 40 | 47 | — |

=== Race victories ===
- 23 wins – (8 DH, 13 SG, 1 PGS, 1 SC)
- 55 podiums – (19 DH, 26 SG, 6 GS, 2 PGS, 2 SC); 137 top tens

| Season | Date | Location | Discipline |
|---|---|---|---|
| 2012 | 4 March 2012 | Kvitfjell, Norway | Super-G |
| 2014 | 28 February 2014 | Kvitfjell, Norway | Downhill |
| 2014 | 2 March 2014 | Kvitfjell, Norway | Super-G |
| 2015 | 29 November 2014 | Lake Louise, Canada | Downhill |
| 2015 | 30 November 2014 | Lake Louise, Canada | Super-G |
| 2015 | 5 December 2014 | (United States) Beaver Creek, USA | Downhill |
| 2015 | 20 December 2014 | Val Gardena, Italy | Super-G |
| 2015 | 24 January 2015 | Kitzbühel, Austria | Downhill |
| 2015 | 8 March 2015 | Kvitfjell, Norway | Super-G |
| 2015 | 18 March 2015 | Méribel, France | Downhill |
| 2016 | 21 December 2015 | Alta Badia, Italy | Parallel-G |
| 2016 | 15 January 2016 | Wengen, Switzerland | Combined |
| 2016 | 6 February 2016 | Jeongseon, South Korea | Downhill |
| 2016 | 13 March 2016 | Kvitfjell, Norway | Super-G |
| 2017 | 2 December 2016 | Val-d'Isère, France | Super-G |
| 2017 | 3 December 2016 | Val-d'Isère, France | Downhill |
| 2017 | 16 December 2016 | Val Gardena, Italy | Super-G |
| 2017 | 27 December 2016 | Santa Caterina, Italy | Super-G |
| 2017 | 25 February 2017 | Kvitfjell, Norway | Downhill |
| 2018 | 26 November 2017 | Lake Louise, Canada | Super-G |
| 2018 | 11 March 2018 | Kvitfjell, Norway | Super-G |
| 2019 | 25 November 2018 | Lake Louise, Canada | Super-G |
| 2020 | 24 January 2020 | Kitzbühel, Austria | Super-G |

== World Championship results ==
| Year | Age | Slalom | Giant slalom | Super-G | Downhill | Combined |
|---|---|---|---|---|---|---|
| 2005 | 19 | DNF1 | — | — | — | — |
| 2007 | 21 | injured, did not compete | | | | |
| 2009 | 23 | DNF1 | DNF1 | DNF | — | 9 |
| 2011 | 25 | DNF1 | 5 | DNF | — | 10 |
| 2013 | 27 | — | — | DNF | — | — |
| 2015 | 29 | — | — | 4 | 15 | 2 |
| 2017 | 31 | — | — | 2 | 4 | DNS2 |
| 2019 | 33 | — | — | 22 | 1 | — |
| 2021 | 35 | — | — | 12 | 8 | DNS2 |

== Olympic results ==
| Year | Age | Slalom | Giant slalom | Super-G | Downhill | Combined |
|---|---|---|---|---|---|---|
| 2006 | 20 | — | DNS2 | — | — | 10 |
| 2010 | 24 | 17 | 2 | 12 | 31 | 9 |
| 2014 | 28 | — | DNF2 | 1 | 3 | 4 |
| 2018 | 32 | — | DNF1 | 3 | 2 | 7 |
| 2022 | 36 | — | — | 23 | DNS | — |
