= Cande Moreno =

Andorran alpine skier (born 2000)

Personal information
- Full name: Candelaria Moreno Becerra
- Born: 30 October 2000 (age 25) Córdoba, Argentina

Sport
- Country: Andorra
- Sport: Alpine skiing
- Club: Esqui Club d'Andorra

Candelaria Moreno Becerra (Note: In this Spanish name, the first or paternal surname is Moreno and the second or maternal family name is Becerra.) (born 30 October 2000) is an Andorran Olympic alpine skier.

== Life and career ==
Moreno was born 30 October 2000 in Córdoba, Argentina.

She participated in the 2022 Winter Olympics, finishing 30th in the Super G, Women, and 12th in the Combined Women competitions.

During the opening ceremony of the 2026 Winter Olympics, she was an Andorran flagbearer alongside Joan Verdú and Irineu Esteve. She competed in the Downhill competition, however she didn't finish after suffering a fall.
