= Nahum Orobitg =

Andorran alpine skier (born 1971)

Personal information
- Full name: Nahum Orobitg Pérez
- Nationality: Andorran
- Born: 18 November 1971 (age 53)

Sport
- Country: Andorra
- Sport: Alpine skiing

Nahum Orobitg Pérez (Note: In this Catalan name, the first or paternal surname is Orobitg and the second or maternal family name is Pérez; both are generally joined by the conjunction "i".) (born 18 November 1971) is an Andorran alpine skier. He competed at the 1988 Winter Olympics and the 1992 Winter Olympics.
