= Ramon Rossell =

Andorran alpine skier (born 1971)

Ramón Rossell
Personal information
- Full name: Ramón Rossell Mas
- Born: 24 June 1971 (age 53); Andorra la Vella, Andorra

Sport
- Country: Andorra
- Sport: Alpine skiing

Ramón Rossell Mas (Note: In this Catalan name, the first or paternal surname is Rossell and the second or maternal family name is Mas; both are generally joined by the conjunction "i".) (born 24 June 1971) is an Andorran alpine skier. He competed at the 1992 Winter Olympics and the 1994 Winter Olympics.
