= Christopher Hörl =

Moldovan-Austrian alpine skier (born 1989)

Personal information
- Nationality: Austrian, Moldovan
- Born: 30 August 1989 (age 36) Zell am See, Austria

Sport
- Sport: Alpine skiing

Christopher Hörl (born 30 August 1989 in Zell am See) is an Austrian alpine skier competing for Moldova. He competed in the 2018 Winter Olympics.
