= 2018–19 FIS Alpine Ski World Cup =

International sports competition

Discipline	Men	Women
Overall	(Austria) Marcel Hirscher	(United States) Mikaela Shiffrin
Downhill	(Switzerland) Beat Feuz	(Austria) Nicole Schmidhofer
Super-G	(Italy) Dominik Paris	(United States) Mikaela Shiffrin
Giant Slalom	(Austria) Marcel Hirscher	(United States) Mikaela Shiffrin
Slalom	(Austria) Marcel Hirscher	(United States) Mikaela Shiffrin
Combined	(France) Alexis Pinturault	(Italy) Federica Brignone
Nations Cup	Austria	Austria
- Nations Cup Overall: Austria

Competition
Locations	20 venues	21 venues
Individual	39 events	35 events
Mixed	1 event	1 event
Cancelled	5 events	4 events
Rescheduled	4 events	3 events

Overall Champions

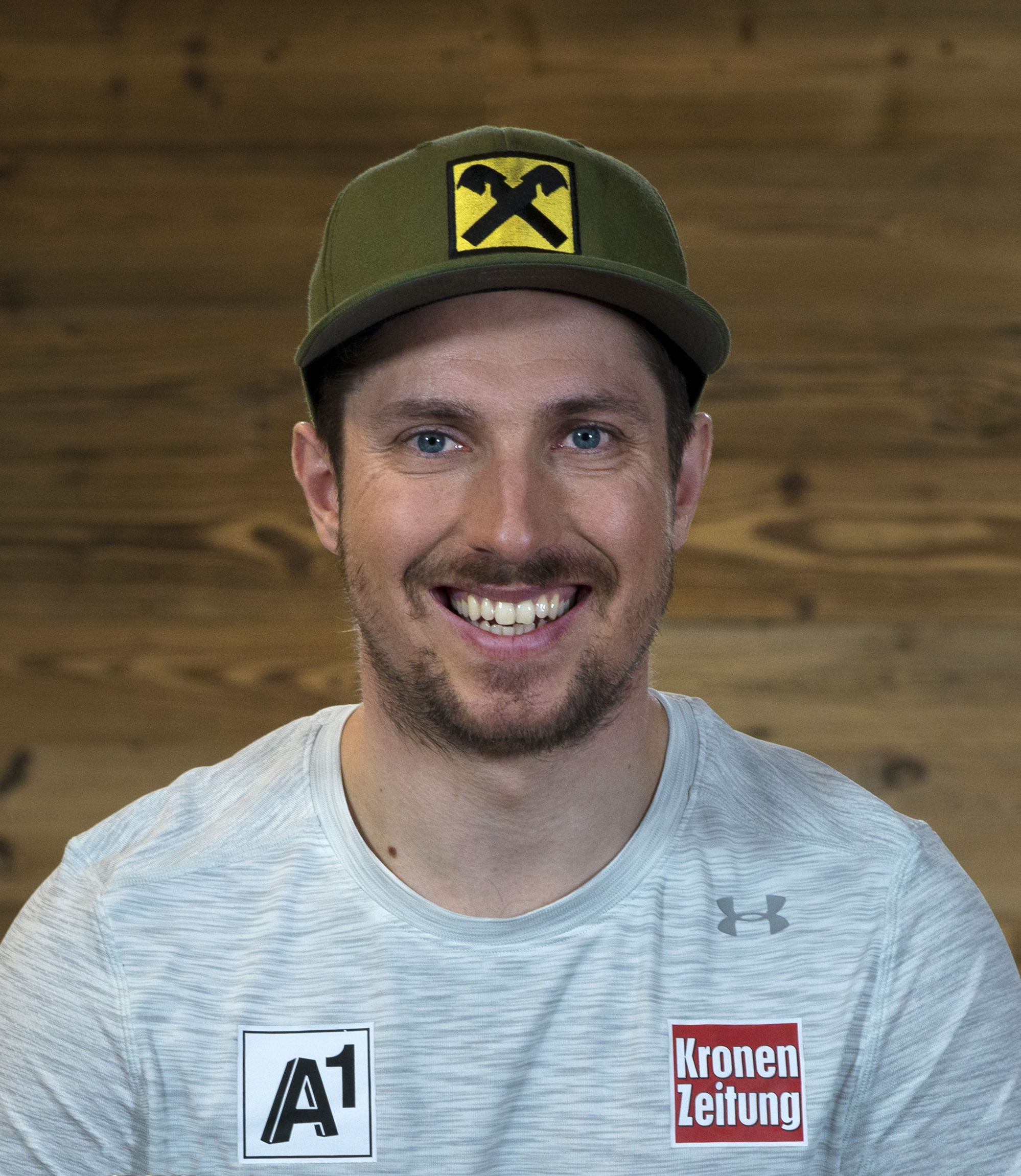
Marcel Hirscher won the overall title for the eighth successive year.

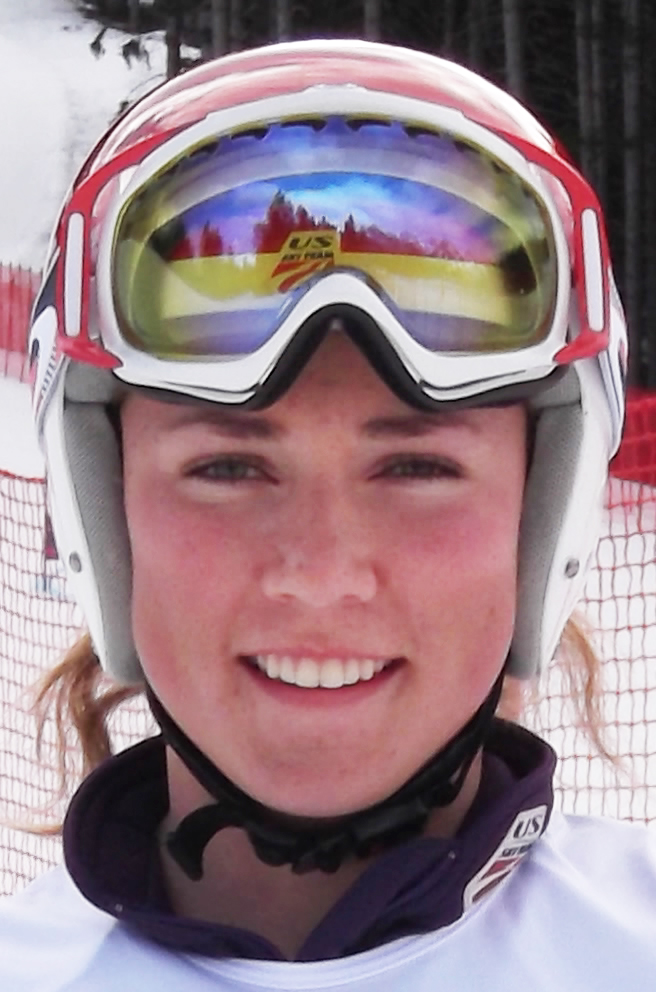
Mikaela Shiffrin won the overall title for the third successive year.

The International Ski Federation (FIS) Alpine Ski World Cup was the premier circuit for alpine skiing competition. The inaugural season launched in January 1967, and the 2018–19 season marks the 53rd consecutive year for the FIS World Cup.

This season began in October 2018 in Sölden, Austria, and concluded in mid-March 2019 at the finals in Soldeu, Andorra. The biennial World Championships interrupted the tour in early February in Åre, Sweden. During the season, the most successful female skier of all time, four-time overall World Cup champion Lindsey Vonn of the United States, retired after the World Championships, at which she won a bronze medal in downhill. Also, two-time overall champion Aksel Lund Svindal of Norway retired at the same meet, at which he won a silver medal in downhill.

Marcel Hirscher of Austria won his eighth straight men's overall championship, an all-time record, and moved in third place in overall wins (68) behind only Ingemar Stenmark (86) and Vonn (82). Mikaela Shiffrin of the United States won her third straight women's overall championship and moved into 5th place on the overall win list (60). After the season, Hirscher also retired.

== Men ==
=== Calendar ===
Event Key: DH – Downhill, SL – Slalom, GS – Giant Slalom, SG – Super Giant Slalom, AC – Alpine Combined, CE – City Event (Parallel), PG – Parallel Giant Slalom
#	Event	Date	Venue	Type	Winner	Second	Third	Details
		28 October 2018	(Austria) Sölden	GS _{cnx}	heavy snowfall and excessive high winds; rescheduled to Saalbach-Hinterglemm on 19 December			
1709	1	18 November 2018	(Finland) Levi	SL _{479}	(Austria) Marcel Hirscher	(Norway) Henrik Kristoffersen	(Sweden) André Myhrer	
1710	2	24 November 2018	(Canada) Lake Louise	DH _{480}	(Austria) Max Franz	(Italy) Christof Innerhofer	(Italy) Dominik Paris	
1711	3	25 November 2018	(Canada) Lake Louise	SG _{205}	(Norway) Kjetil Jansrud	(Austria) Vincent Kriechmayr	(Switzerland) Mauro Caviezel	
1712	4	(Note: heavy snowfall; Downhill in Beaver Creek was switched with super giant slalom and rescheduled from 1 December 2018 to 30 November 2018)30 November 2018	(United States) Beaver Creek	DH _{481}	(Switzerland) Beat Feuz	(Switzerland) Mauro Caviezel	(Norway) Aksel Lund Svindal	
1713	5	(Note: heavy snowfall; Super giant slalom in Beaver Creek was switched with downhill and rescheduled from 30 November 2018 to 1 December 2018; start of competition was postponed for one hour and moved lower because of the heavy snowfall)1 December 2018	(United States) Beaver Creek	SG _{206}	(Austria) Max Franz	(Switzerland) Mauro Caviezel	(Norway) Aleksander Aamodt Kilde (Italy) Dominik Paris (Norway) Aksel Lund Svindal	
1714	6	(Note: FIS disqualified Stefan Luitz from the GS victory at Beaver Creek for breaking the organisation's rule by inhaling oxygen before the competition. However, he didn't break the rules of doping and he can continue to compete on normally. Marcel Hirscher initially inherited the race victory. However, later Luitz has successfully overturned his disqualification at the Court of Arbitration for Sport (CAS) and his result was reinstated.)2 December 2018	(United States) Beaver Creek	GS _{405}	(Germany) Stefan Luitz	(Austria) Marcel Hirscher	(Switzerland) Thomas Tumler	
1715	7	8 December 2018	(France) Val d'Isère	GS _{406}	(Austria) Marcel Hirscher	(Norway) Henrik Kristoffersen	(Sweden) Matts Olsson	
		9 December 2018	(France) Val d'Isère	SL _{cnx}	heavy snowfall and strong wind; rescheduled to Saalbach-Hinterglemm on 20 December			
1716	8	14 December 2018	(Italy) Val Gardena/Gröden	SG _{207}	(Norway) Aksel Lund Svindal	(Italy) Christof Innerhofer	(Norway) Kjetil Jansrud	
1717	9	15 December 2018	(Italy) Val Gardena/Gröden	DH _{482}	(Norway) Aleksander Aamodt Kilde	(Austria) Max Franz	(Switzerland) Beat Feuz	
1718	10	16 December 2018	(Italy) Alta Badia	GS _{407}	(Austria) Marcel Hirscher	(France) Thomas Fanara	(France) Alexis Pinturault	
1719	11	17 December 2018	(Italy) Alta Badia	PG _{004}	(Austria) Marcel Hirscher	(France) Thibaut Favrot	(France) Alexis Pinturault	
1720	12	(Note: opening Giant Slalom from Sölden scheduled on 28 October 2018 is rescheduled to Saalbach-Hinterglemm on 19 December 2018.)19 December 2018	(Austria) Saalbach-Hinterglemm	GS _{408}	(Slovenia) Žan Kranjec	(Switzerland) Loïc Meillard	(France) Mathieu Faivre	
1721	13	(Note: Slalom from Val d'Isère is rescheduled to Saalbach-Hinterglemm on 20 December 2018.)20 December 2018	(Austria) Saalbach-Hinterglemm	SL _{480}	(Austria) Marcel Hirscher	(Switzerland) Loïc Meillard	(Norway) Henrik Kristoffersen	
1722	14	22 December 2018	(Italy) Madonna di Campiglio	SL _{481}	(Switzerland) Daniel Yule	(Austria) Marco Schwarz	(Austria) Michael Matt	
1723	15	28 December 2018	(Italy) Bormio	DH _{483}	(Italy) Dominik Paris	(Italy) Christof Innerhofer	(Switzerland) Beat Feuz	
1724	16	29 December 2018	(Italy) Bormio	SG _{208}	(Italy) Dominik Paris	(Austria) Matthias Mayer	(Norway) Aleksander Aamodt Kilde	
1725	17	1 January 2019	(Norway) Oslo	CE _{009}	(Austria) Marco Schwarz	(United Kingdom) Dave Ryding	(Switzerland) Ramon Zenhäusern	
1726	18	6 January 2019	(Croatia) Zagreb	SL _{482}	(Austria) Marcel Hirscher	(France) Alexis Pinturault	(Austria) Manuel Feller	
1727	19	12 January 2019	(Switzerland) Adelboden	GS _{409}	(Austria) Marcel Hirscher	(Norway) Henrik Kristoffersen	(France) Thomas Fanara	
1728	20	13 January 2019	(Switzerland) Adelboden	SL _{483}	(Austria) Marcel Hirscher	(France) Clément Noël	(Norway) Henrik Kristoffersen	
1729	21	18 January 2019	(Switzerland) Wengen	AC _{130}	(Austria) Marco Schwarz	(France) Victor Muffat-Jeandet	(France) Alexis Pinturault	
1730	22	19 January 2019	(Switzerland) Wengen	DH _{484}	(Austria) Vincent Kriechmayr	(Switzerland) Beat Feuz	(Norway) Aleksander Aamodt Kilde	
1731	23	20 January 2019	(Switzerland) Wengen	SL _{484}	(France) Clément Noël	(Austria) Manuel Feller	(Austria) Marcel Hirscher	
1732	24	(Note: Because of the worst weather forecast on Saturday, Downhill in Kitzbühel was rescheduled from 26 to 25 January 2019 on Friday. It was switched with original Super-G date.)25 January 2019	(Austria) Kitzbühel	DH _{485}	(Italy) Dominik Paris	(Switzerland) Beat Feuz	(Austria) Otmar Striedinger	
1733	25	(Note: Because of the worst weather forecast in the weekend, Slalom in Kitzbühel which is easier to organize, is rescheduled from 27 to 26 January 2019. It will be switched with original downhill date.)26 January 2019	(Austria) Kitzbühel	SL _{485}	(France) Clément Noël	(Austria) Marcel Hirscher	(France) Alexis Pinturault	
1734	26	(Note: Because of the downhill switch date on Friday, Super-G in Kitzbühel is rescheduled from 25 to 27 January 2019.)≥27 January 2019	(Austria) Kitzbühel	SG _{209}	(Germany) Josef Ferstl	(France) Johan Clarey	(Italy) Dominik Paris	
1735	27	29 January 2019	(Austria) Schladming	SL _{486}	(Austria) Marcel Hirscher	(France) Alexis Pinturault	(Switzerland) Daniel Yule	
		2 February 2019	(Germany) Garmisch-Partenkirchen	DH _{cnx}	fog, rain and heavy snowfall, rescheduled to Kvitfjell on 1 March			
		3 February 2019	(Germany) Garmisch-Partenkirchen	GS _{cnx}	fog, rain and heavy snowfall			
World Championships (5–17 February)
1736	28	19 February 2019	(Sweden) Stockholm	CE _{010}	(Switzerland) Ramon Zenhäusern	(Sweden) André Myhrer	(Austria) Marco Schwarz	
1737	29	22 February 2019	(Bulgaria) Bansko	AC _{131}	(France) Alexis Pinturault	(Austria) Marcel Hirscher	(Slovenia) Štefan Hadalin	
		23 February 2019	(Bulgaria) Bansko	SG _{cnx}	heavy snowfall			
1738	30	24 February 2019	(Bulgaria) Bansko	GS _{410}	(Norway) Henrik Kristoffersen	(Austria) Marcel Hirscher	(France) Thomas Fanara	
		1 March 2019	(Norway) Kvitfjell	DH _{cnx}	heavy snowfall			
1739	31	2 March 2019	(Norway) Kvitfjell	DH _{486}	(Italy) Dominik Paris	(Switzerland) Beat Feuz	(Austria) Matthias Mayer	
1740	32	3 March 2019	(Norway) Kvitfjell	SG _{210}	(Italy) Dominik Paris	(Norway) Kjetil Jansrud	(Switzerland) Beat Feuz	
1741	33	9 March 2019	(Slovenia) Kranjska Gora	GS _{411}	(Norway) Henrik Kristoffersen	(Norway) Rasmus Windingstad	(Switzerland) Marco Odermatt	
1742	34	10 March 2019	(Slovenia) Kranjska Gora	SL _{487}	(Switzerland) Ramon Zenhäusern	(Norway) Henrik Kristoffersen	(Austria) Marcel Hirscher	
1743	35	13 March 2019	(Andorra) Soldeu	DH _{487}	(Italy) Dominik Paris	(Norway) Kjetil Jansrud	(Austria) Otmar Striedinger	
1744	36	14 March 2019	(Andorra) Soldeu	SG _{211}	(Italy) Dominik Paris	(Switzerland) Mauro Caviezel	(Austria) Vincent Kriechmayr	
1745	37	16 March 2019	(Andorra) Soldeu	GS _{412}	(France) Alexis Pinturault	(Switzerland) Marco Odermatt	(Slovenia) Žan Kranjec	
1746	38	17 March 2019	(Andorra) Soldeu	SL _{488}	(France) Clément Noël	(Austria) Manuel Feller	(Switzerland) Daniel Yule	

=== Rankings ===
==== Overall ====
Rank	after all 38 races	Points
	(Austria) Marcel Hirscher	1546
2	(France) Alexis Pinturault	1145
3	(Norway) Henrik Kristoffersen	1047
4	(Italy) Dominik Paris	950
5	(Austria) Vincent Kriechmayr	739

==== Downhill ====
Rank	after all 8 races	Points
	(Switzerland) Beat Feuz	540
2	(Italy) Dominik Paris	520
3	(Austria) Vincent Kriechmayr	339
4	(Norway) Aleksander Aamodt Kilde	284
5	(Switzerland) Mauro Caviezel	282

==== Super G ====
Rank	after all 7 races	Points
	(Italy) Dominik Paris	430
2	(Austria) Vincent Kriechmayr	346
3	(Switzerland) Mauro Caviezel	324
4	(Norway) Kjetil Jansrud	316
5	(Norway) Aleksander Aamodt Kilde	299

==== Giant Slalom/Parallel Giant Slalom ====
Rank	after all 9 races	Points
	(Austria) Marcel Hirscher	680
2	(Norway) Henrik Kristoffersen	516
3	(France) Alexis Pinturault	469
4	(Slovenia) Žan Kranjec	344
5	(Switzerland) Loic Meillard	313

==== Slalom/Parallel Slalom ====
Rank	after all 12 races	Points
	(Austria) Marcel Hirscher	786
2	(France) Clément Noël	551
3	(Switzerland) Daniel Yule	551
4	(Switzerland) Ramon Zenhäusern	521
5	(Norway) Henrik Kristoffersen	516

==== Combined ====
Rank	after all 2 races	Points
	(France) Alexis Pinturault	160
2	(Austria) Marco Schwarz	100
3	(Switzerland) Mauro Caviezel	90
4	(Italy) Riccardo Tonetti	82
5	(Austria) Marcel Hirscher	80
	(France) Victor Muffat-Jeandet	80

== Women ==
Prior to the start of the season, 4-time overall World Cup champion (and 20-time crystal globe winner) Lindsey Vonn of the United States announced her retirement effective as of the end of the season. Due to lingering injuries, she moved her retirement date up to the World Championships in February.

In December, Mikaela Shiffrin became the eighth athlete (four men, four women) to win at least 50 World Cup races across all disciplines, as well as the youngest (at age 23) to do so. Shiffrin ended the season with 17 race victories (3 Super Gs, 4 giant slaloms, 8 slaloms, and 2 parallel slaloms/city events), breaking Vreni Schneider's 30-year-old record of 14 wins in a (much shorter) season, which was set in the 1988-89 season. Shiffrin also won four crystal globes for the season, tying the women's record held by Vonn and Tina Maze.

On 6 March 2019, former slalom season champion (and Olympic gold medalist) Frida Hansdotter announced her retirement from alpine skiing following the 2018–2019 season.

=== Calendar ===
Event Key: DH – Downhill, SL – Slalom, GS – Giant Slalom, SG – Super Giant Slalom, AC – Alpine Combined, CE – City Event (Parallel), PS – Parallel slalom (qualification run)
#	Event	Date	Venue	Type	Winner	Second	Third	Details
1602	1	27 October 2018	(Austria) Sölden	GS _{405}	(France) Tessa Worley	(Italy) Federica Brignone	(United States) Mikaela Shiffrin	
1603	2	(Note: Slalom start in Levi on 17 November 2018 was moved lower; strong wind on top of the course)17 November 2018	(Finland) Levi	SL _{455}	(United States) Mikaela Shiffrin	(Slovakia) Petra Vlhová	(Austria) Bernadette Schild	
1604	3	24 November 2018	(United States) Killington	GS _{406}	(Italy) Federica Brignone	(Norway) Ragnhild Mowinckel	(Austria) Stephanie Brunner	
1605	4	25 November 2018	(United States) Killington	SL _{456}	(United States) Mikaela Shiffrin	(Slovakia) Petra Vlhová	(Sweden) Frida Hansdotter	
1606	5	30 November 2018	(Canada) Lake Louise	DH _{402}	(Austria) Nicole Schmidhofer	(Switzerland) Michelle Gisin	(Germany) Kira Weidle	
1607	6	1 December 2018	(Canada) Lake Louise	DH _{403}	(Austria) Nicole Schmidhofer	(Austria) Cornelia Hütter	(Switzerland) Michelle Gisin	
1608	7	2 December 2018	(Canada) Lake Louise	SG _{227}	(United States) Mikaela Shiffrin	(Norway) Ragnhild Mowinckel	(Germany) Viktoria Rebensburg	
1609	8	8 December 2018	(Switzerland) St. Moritz	SG _{228}	(United States) Mikaela Shiffrin	(Switzerland) Lara Gut-Behrami	(Liechtenstein) Tina Weirather	
1610	9	9 December 2018	(Switzerland) St. Moritz	PS _{005}	(United States) Mikaela Shiffrin	(Slovakia) Petra Vlhová	(Switzerland) Wendy Holdener	
		14 December 2018	(France) Val d'Isère	AC _{cnx}	warm weather and lack of snow			
		15 December 2018	(France) Val d'Isère	DH _{cnx}	warm weather and lack of snow; rescheduled in Val Gardena on 18 December			
		16 December 2018	(France) Val d'Isère	SG _{cnx}	warm weather and lack of snow; rescheduled in Val Gardena on 19 December			
1611	10	(Note: Downhill from Val d'Isère was rescheduled in Val Gardena/Gröden on 18 December 2018)18 December 2018	(Italy) Val Gardena/Gröden	DH _{404}	(Slovenia) Ilka Štuhec	(Italy) Nicol Delago	(Austria) Ramona Siebenhofer	
1612	11	(Note: Super giant slalom from Val d'Isère was rescheduled in Val Gardena/Gröden on 19 December 2018)19 December 2018	(Italy) Val Gardena/Gröden	SG _{229}	(Slovenia) Ilka Štuhec	(Austria) Nicole Schmidhofer (Liechtenstein) Tina Weirather		
1613	12	21 December 2018	(France) Courchevel	GS _{407}	(United States) Mikaela Shiffrin	(Germany) Viktoria Rebensburg	(France) Tessa Worley	
1614	13	22 December 2018	(France) Courchevel	SL _{457}	(United States) Mikaela Shiffrin	(Slovakia) Petra Vlhová	(Sweden) Frida Hansdotter	
1615	14	28 December 2018	(Austria) Semmering	GS _{408}	(Slovakia) Petra Vlhová	(Germany) Viktoria Rebensburg	(France) Tessa Worley	
1616	15	29 December 2018	(Austria) Semmering	SL _{458}	(United States) Mikaela Shiffrin	(Slovakia) Petra Vlhová	(Switzerland) Wendy Holdener	
1617	16	1 January 2019	(Norway) Oslo	CE _{009}	(Slovakia) Petra Vlhová	(United States) Mikaela Shiffrin	(Switzerland) Wendy Holdener	
1618	17	5 January 2019	(Croatia) Zagreb	SL _{459}	(United States) Mikaela Shiffrin	(Slovakia) Petra Vlhová	(Switzerland) Wendy Holdener	
1619	18	8 January 2019	(Austria) Flachau	SL _{460}	(Slovakia) Petra Vlhová	(United States) Mikaela Shiffrin	(Austria) Katharina Liensberger	
		12 January 2019	(Austria) St. Anton	DH _{cnx}	heavy snowfall with over three metres of snow; rescheduled in Cortina d'Ampezzo on 18 January			
		13 January 2019	(Austria) St. Anton	SG _{cnx}	heavy snowfall with over three metres of snow			
1620	19	15 January 2019	(Italy) Kronplatz	GS _{409}	(United States) Mikaela Shiffrin	(France) Tessa Worley	(Italy) Marta Bassino	
1621	20	(Note: Downhill from St. Anton was rescheduled in Cortina d'Ampezzo on 18 January 2019)18 January 2019	(Italy) Cortina d'Ampezzo	DH _{405}	(Austria) Ramona Siebenhofer	(Slovenia) Ilka Štuhec	(Austria) Stephanie Venier	
1622	21	19 January 2019	(Italy) Cortina d'Ampezzo	DH _{406}	(Austria) Ramona Siebenhofer	(Austria) Nicole Schmidhofer	(Slovenia) Ilka Štuhec	
1623	22	20 January 2019	(Italy) Cortina d'Ampezzo	SG _{230}	(United States) Mikaela Shiffrin	(Liechtenstein) Tina Weirather	(Austria) Tamara Tippler	
1624	23	(Note: Because of the bad weather forecast, program in Garmisch-Partenkirchen is switched. Super-G is rescheduled from 27 to 26 January 2019.)26 January 2019	(Germany) Garmisch-Partenkirchen	SG _{231}	(Austria) Nicole Schmidhofer	(Italy) Sofia Goggia	(Switzerland) Lara Gut-Behrami	
1625	24	(Note: Because of the bad weather forecast, program in Garmisch-Partenkirchen is switched. Downhill is rescheduled from 26 to 27 January 2019.)27 January 2019	(Germany) Garmisch-Partenkirchen	DH _{407}	(Austria) Stephanie Venier	(Italy) Sofia Goggia	(Germany) Kira Weidle	
1626	25	1 February 2019	(Slovenia) Maribor	GS _{410}	(United States) Mikaela Shiffrin (Slovakia) Petra Vlhová		(Norway) Ragnhild Mowinckel	
1627	26	2 February 2019	(Slovenia) Maribor	SL _{461}	(United States) Mikaela Shiffrin	(Sweden) Anna Swenn-Larsson	(Switzerland) Wendy Holdener	
World Championships (5–17 February)
1628	27	19 February 2019	(Sweden) Stockholm	CE _{010}	(United States) Mikaela Shiffrin	(Germany) Christina Geiger	(Sweden) Anna Swenn-Larsson	
1629	28	23 February 2019	(Switzerland) Crans-Montana	DH _{408}	(Italy) Sofia Goggia	(Austria) Nicole Schmidhofer	(Switzerland) Corinne Suter	
1630	29	24 February 2019	(Switzerland) Crans-Montana	AC _{104}	(Italy) Federica Brignone	(Canada) Roni Remme	(Switzerland) Wendy Holdener	
		1 March 2019	(Russia) Rosa Khutor	DH _{cnx}	heavy snowfall			
		2 March 2019	(Russia) Rosa Khutor	SG _{cnx}	heavy snowfall			
		3 March 2019	(Russia) Rosa Khutor	SG _{cnx}	heavy snowfall			
1631	30	8 March 2019	(Czech Republic) Špindlerův Mlýn	GS _{411}	(Slovakia) Petra Vlhová	(Germany) Viktoria Rebensburg	(United States) Mikaela Shiffrin	
1632	31	9 March 2019	(Czech Republic) Špindlerův Mlýn	SL _{462}	(United States) Mikaela Shiffrin	(Switzerland) Wendy Holdener	(Slovakia) Petra Vlhová	
1633	32	13 March 2019	(Andorra) Soldeu	DH _{409}	(Austria) Mirjam Puchner	(Germany) Viktoria Rebensburg	(Switzerland) Corinne Suter	
1634	33	14 March 2019	(Andorra) Soldeu	SG _{232}	(Germany) Viktoria Rebensburg	(Austria) Tamara Tippler	(Italy) Federica Brignone	
1635	34	16 March 2019	(Andorra) Soldeu	SL _{463}	(United States) Mikaela Shiffrin	(Switzerland) Wendy Holdener	(Slovakia) Petra Vlhová	
1636	35	17 March 2019	(Andorra) Soldeu	GS _{412}	(United States) Mikaela Shiffrin	(New Zealand) Alice Robinson	(Slovakia) Petra Vlhová	

=== Rankings ===
==== Overall ====
Rank	after all 35 races	Points
	(United States) Mikaela Shiffrin	2204
2	(Slovakia) Petra Vlhová	1355
3	(Switzerland) Wendy Holdener	1079
4	(Germany) Viktoria Rebensburg	814
5	(Austria) Nicole Schmidhofer	771

==== Downhill ====
Rank	after all 8 races	Points
	(Austria) Nicole Schmidhofer	468
2	(Austria) Stephanie Venier	372
3	(Austria) Ramona Siebenhofer	354
4	(Slovenia) Ilka Štuhec	343
5	(Germany) Kira Weidle	307

==== Super G ====
Rank	after all 6 races	Points
	(United States) Mikaela Shiffrin	350
2	(Austria) Nicole Schmidhofer	303
3	(Liechtenstein) Tina Weirather	268
4	(Germany) Viktoria Rebensburg	257
5	(Norway) Ragnhild Mowinckel	247

==== Giant Slalom ====
Rank	after all 8 races	Points
	(United States) Mikaela Shiffrin	615
2	(Slovakia) Petra Vlhová	478
3	(France) Tessa Worley	460
4	(Germany) Viktoria Rebensburg	380
5	(Italy) Federica Brignone	360

==== Slalom/Parallel Slalom ====
Rank	after all 12 races	Points
	(United States) Mikaela Shiffrin	1160
2	(Slovakia) Petra Vlhová	877
3	(Switzerland) Wendy Holdener	681
4	(Sweden) Anna Swenn-Larsson	486
5	(Sweden) Frida Hansdotter	479

==== Combined ====
Rank	after all 1 race	Points
	(Italy) Federica Brignone	100
2	(Canada) Roni Remme	80
3	(Switzerland) Wendy Holdener	60
4	(Switzerland) Rahel Kopp	50
5	(Germany) Patrizia Dorsch	45

== Alpine team event ==
=== Calendar ===
Event Key: PG – Parallel Giant Slalom
#	Event	Date	Venue	Type	Winner	Second	Third	Details
14	1	15 March 2019	(Andorra) Soldeu	PG _{011}	Switzerland Aline Danioth; Wendy Holdener; Sandro Simonet*; Daniel Yule; Ramon Zenhäusern	Norway Mina Fürst Holtmann; Sebastian Foss-Solevåg; Kristin Lysdahl*; Leif Kristian Nestvold-Haugen; Thea Louise Stjernesund; Rasmus Windingstad*	Germany Lena Dürr; Christina Geiger; Fabian Himmelsbach; Alexander Schmid*; Anton Tremmel	

* reserve skiers

== Nations Cup ==
Overall

Rank	after all 74 races	Points
1	Austria	11581
2	Switzerland	8102
3	Norway	5716
4	Italy	5685
5	France	5543

Men

Rank	after all 39 races	Points
1	Austria	6102
2	Switzerland	4650
3	France	4202
4	Norway	3754
5	Italy	2881

Women

Rank	after all 36 races	Points
1	Austria	5479
2	Switzerland	3452
3	Italy	2804
4	United States	2498
5	Norway	1962

== Prize money ==
Top-5 men

Rank	after all 38 races	CHF
1	(Austria) Marcel Hirscher	565,111
2	(Italy) Dominik Paris	382,710
3	(France) Alexis Pinturault	242,631
4	(Norway) Henrik Kristoffersen	234,150
5	(France) Clément Noël	207,860

Top-5 women

Rank	after all 35 races	CHF
1	(United States) Mikaela Shiffrin	886,386
2	(Slovakia) Petra Vlhová	428,195
3	(Austria) Nicole Schmidhofer	209,450
4	(Germany) Viktoria Rebensburg	174,750
5	(Switzerland) Wendy Holdener	166,909

== Retirements ==
The following athletes announced their retirements during or after the season:

Men

- (Canada) Phil Brown
- (Canada) Erik Guay
- (France) Thomas Fanara
- (Sweden) Mattias Hargin
- (Italy) Werner Heel
- (Austria) Marcel Hirscher (announced comeback in season 2024-25 for Netherlands)
- (Switzerland) Patrick Küng
- (France) Thomas Mermillod Blondin
- (France) Steve Missillier
- (Germany) Felix Neureuther
- (Finland) Andreas Romar
- (Austria) Philipp Schörghofer
- (Norway) Aksel Lund Svindal
- (Switzerland) Sandro Viletta
- (Croatia) Natko Zrnčić-Dim

Women

- (France) Margot Bailet
- (France) Taina Barioz
- (France) Anne-Sophie Barthet
- (France) Adeline Baud Mugnier
- (Monaco) Alexandra Coletti
- (Italy) Chiara Costazza
- (Norway) Kristine Gjelsten Haugen
- (Sweden) Frida Hansdotter
- (Italy) Anna Hofer
- (Germany) Ann-Katrin Magg
- (United States) Lindsey Vonn (announced comeback in season 2024-25)
