= Aksel Lund Svindal =

Norwegian alpine skier (born 1982)

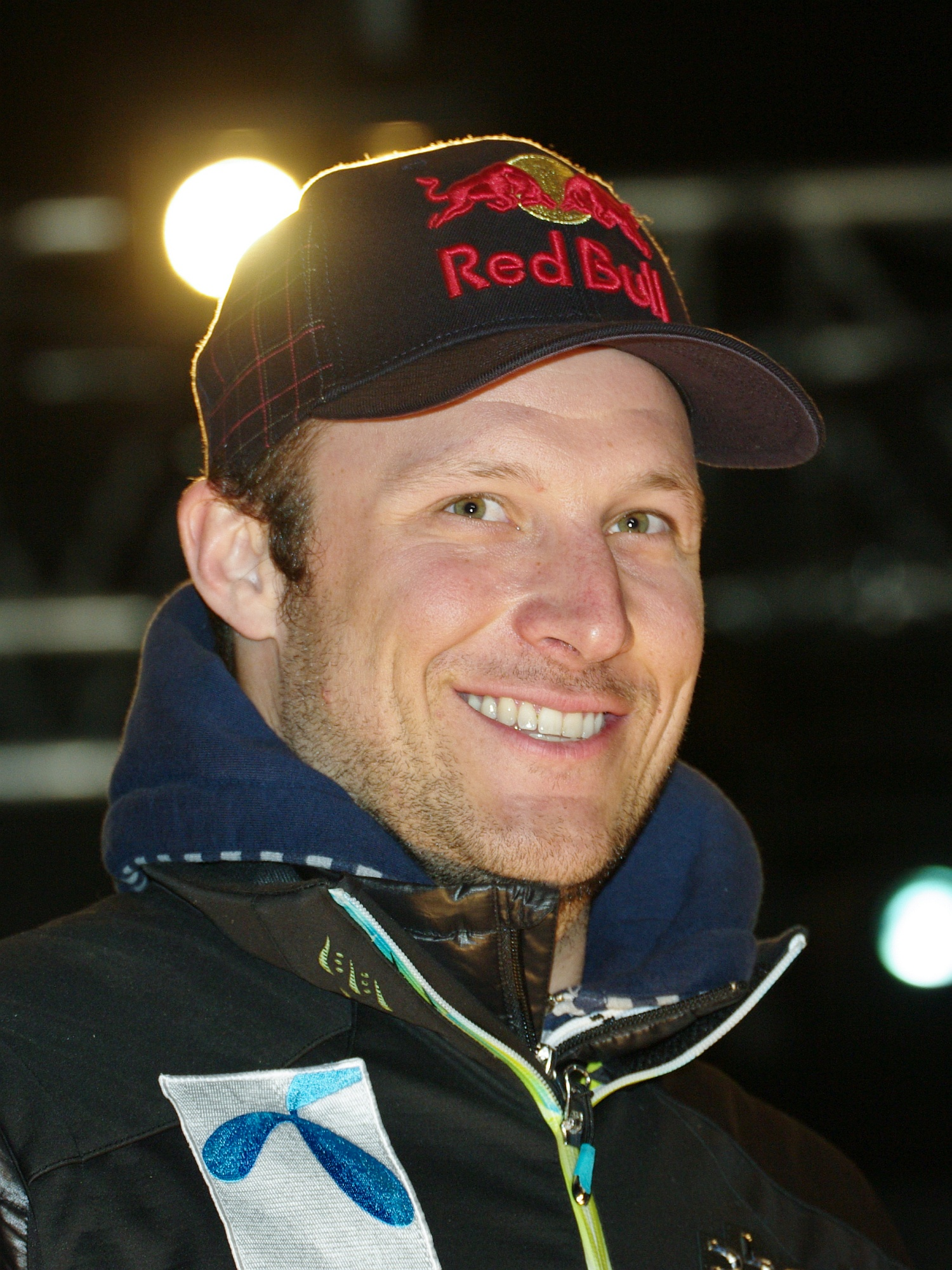
- Svindal in February 2011

Personal information
- Born: 26 December 1982 (age 43)
- Height: 189 cm (6 ft 2 in)
- Website: aksellundsvindal.com

Skiing career
- Sport: Alpine skiing
- Club: Nero Alpin
- Retired: 9 February 2019 (age 36)
- Disciplines: Downhill, super-G, giant slalom, combined
- World Cup debut: 28 October 2001 (age 18)

Olympics
- Teams: 4 – (2006, 2010, 2014, 2018)
- Medals: 4 (2 gold)

World Championships
- Teams: 8 – (2003–15, 2019)
- Medals: 9 (5 gold)

World Cup
- Seasons: 17 – (2002–14, 2016–19)
- Wins: 36 – (14 DH, 17 SG, 4 GS, 1 SC)
- Podiums: 80
- Overall titles: 2 – (2007, 2009)
- Discipline titles: 9 – (2 DH, 5 SG, 1 GS, 1 K)
Medal record
International alpine ski competitions
Event	1st	2nd	3rd
Olympic Games	2	1	1
World Championships	5	2	2
Total	7	3	3
World Cup race podiums
Event	1st	2nd	3rd
Slalom	0	0	0
Giant	4	2	4
Super-G	17	6	7
Downhill	14	8	10
Combined	1	2	4
Parallel	0	1	0
Total	36	19	25
Olympic Games
Gold medal – first place	2010 Vancouver	Super-G
Gold medal – first place	2018 Pyeongchang	Downhill
Silver medal – second place	2010 Vancouver	Downhill
Bronze medal – third place	2010 Vancouver	Giant slalom
World Championships
Gold medal – first place	2007 Åre	Downhill
Gold medal – first place	2007 Åre	Giant slalom
Gold medal – first place	2009 Val-d'Isère	Combined
Gold medal – first place	2011 Garmisch	Combined
Gold medal – first place	2013 Schladming	Downhill
Silver medal – second place	2005 Bormio	Combined
Silver medal – second place	2019 Åre	Downhill
Bronze medal – third place	2009 Val-d'Isère	Super-G
Bronze medal – third place	2013 Schladming	Super-G
Junior World Ski Championships
Gold medal – first place	2002 Tarvisio	Combined
Silver medal – second place	2002 Tarvisio	Super-G
Bronze medal – third place	2002 Tarvisio	Downhill
Bronze medal – third place	2002 Tarvisio	Slalom

Aksel Lund Svindal (born 26 December 1982) is a Norwegian former World Cup alpine ski racer. Born in Lørenskog in Akershus county, Svindal is a two-time overall World Cup champion (2007 and 2009), an Olympic gold medalist in super-G at the 2010 Winter Olympics and in downhill at the 2018 Winter Olympics, and a five-time World Champion in downhill, giant slalom, and super combined (2007 Åre, 2009 Val-d'Isère, 2011 Garmisch, and 2013 Schladming). With his victory in the downhill in 2013, Svindal became the first male alpine racer to win titles in four consecutive world championships.

Svindal is sometimes considered the best Norwegian alpine skier ever. While Kjetil Andre Aamodt has been more successful at the Olympics, Svindal is by far the most successful on the World Cup circuit.

In January 2019, Svindal announced his retirement from alpine skiing following the 2019 Ski World Championships.

== Career ==
During his career, Svindal won nine World Championship medals, four Olympic medals (two of them gold), two overall World Cup and nine discipline titles (in downhill, super-G, giant slalom, and combined), and 36 World Cup races. Additionally, he won four medals at the World Junior Championships in 2002, including gold in combined.

On 27 November 2007, during the first training run for the Birds of Prey downhill race in Beaver Creek, Colorado, Svindal crashed badly after landing a jump. He somersaulted into a safety fence and was taken to Vail Valley Medical Center (now Vail Health Hospital) with broken bones in his face and a six-inch (15 cm) laceration to his groin and abdominal area. Svindal missed the remainder of the 2008 season, and returned to World Cup racing in October 2008. His first two victories following his return were a downhill and a super-G in Beaver Creek, on the same Birds of Prey course where he was injured the year before.

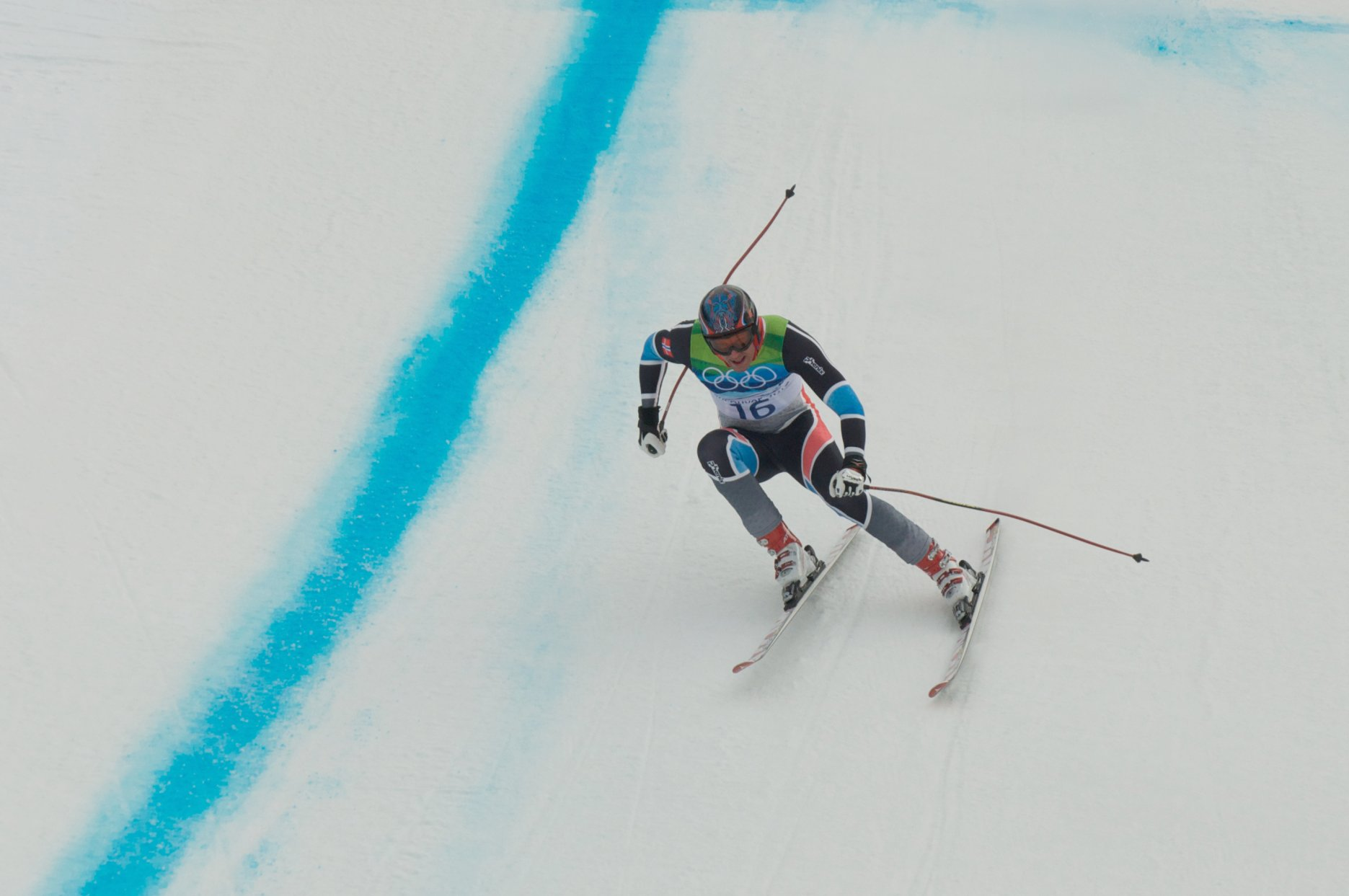
Svindal's silver medal downhill run at the 2010 Olympics at Whistler

At the 2009 World Championships, Svindal won the gold in the super combined. Completing his comeback during the 2009 season, Svindal won his second overall World Cup over Benjamin Raich of Austria. Entering the last race of the season, a slalom at the World Cup finals in Åre, Sweden, Svindal led Raich by just two points. They had won the two previous races (a downhill and giant slalom respectively), with Svindal leading but Raich was the favourite as a specialist in slalom. Both skiers went off course and did not finish the slalom, so the Norwegian became the overall World Cup winner. He also won his fourth discipline title, his second in super G.

At the 2010 Winter Olympics on 15 February, Svindal won the silver medal in the downhill competition in Whistler, 0.07 seconds behind the winner, Didier Défago of Switzerland, and 0.02 seconds ahead of bronze medalist Bode Miller of the United States. Svindal's medal was Norway's hundredth silver medal at the Winter Olympics, the most for any nation.

Four days later on 19 February, Svindal won the super-G, his first-ever Olympic gold medal – ahead of Miller (+ 0.28 seconds) and Andrew Weibrecht (+ 0.31 seconds), both of the U.S.

Svindal successfully defended his world title in the super combined in 2011 at Garmish-Partenkirchen, Germany.

After an Achilles tendon injury in October 2014, Svindal did not compete in World Cup events during the 2015 season. He did enter the World Championships in Colorado in February, and placed sixth in both the downhill and super-G events.

After his season long injury, Svindal had a very strong start to the 2016 season. He managed seven world cup victories before he sustained a season-ending knee injury under tough conditions in Kitzbühel, Austria.

After a fairly good start to the 2016–2017 season including 1 World Cup win, for the third straight season he suffered a season ending/interrupting injury, and this time missed both the majority of the World Cup season and the 2017 World Alpine Ski Championships.

He won another Olympic Gold in the downhill event at the 2018 Winter Olympics, becoming the oldest ever Alpine skiing gold medallist.

In his final race, the downhill at the 2019 World Alpine Ski Championships in Åre in February of that year, Svindal finished second in a Norwegian one-two, being pipped to the gold by team-mate Kjetil Jansrud by a margin of two hundredths of a second.

== Personal life ==
Svindal dated alpine racer Julia Mancuso of the U.S. for three years, until the couple split up in September 2013.

Svindal has been in a relationship with Danish-Norwegian hurdler Amalie Iuel since 2020. The couple welcomed their first child, a son, in September 2023. A month later, they announced their engagement.

In his spare time, he devotes himself to freeskiing, and has already appeared in several freeskiing film documentaries.

One of his best friends is his teammate Kjetil Jansrud.

== World Cup results ==
=== Season titles ===
11 titles: (2 overall, 2 Downhill, 5 Super-G, 1 Giant slalom, 1 Combined)

Season	Discipline
2006	Super-G
2007	Overall
2007	Giant slalom
2007	Combined
2009	Overall
2009	Super-G
2012	Super-G
2013	Downhill
2013	Super-G
2014	Downhill
2014	Super-G

=== Season standings ===
Season	Age	Overall	Slalom	Giant slalom	Super-G	Downhill	Combined
2003	20	39	38	26	23	58	4
2004	21	19	41	19	15	36	6
2005	22	21	37	17	11	30	—
2006	23	2	13	10	1	13	7
2007	24	1	21	1	5	7	1
2008	25	40	50	19	22	45	—
2009	26	1	—	5	1	4	11
2010	27	4	54	8	3	7	—
2011	28	4	59	2	16	10	5
2012	29	3	—	11	1	6	5
2013	30	2	47	7	1	1	5
2014	31	2	—	16	1	1	12
2015	32	injured: did not compete					
2016	33	5	—	27	3	2	9
2017	34	35	—	—	18	15	—
2018	35	3	—	—	3	2	—
2019	36	20	—	—	7	10	—

Standings through 17 March 2019

=== Race victories ===
36 wins – (14 DH, 17 SG, 4 GS, 1 SC)

Season	Date	Location	Discipline
2006	27 November 2005	Lake Louise, Canada	Super-G
2006	15 March 2006	Åre, Sweden	Downhill
2007	30 November 2006	(United States) Beaver Creek, USA	Super combined
2007	21 December 2006	Hinterstoder, Austria	Giant slalom
2007	14 March 2007	Lenzerheide, Switzerland	Downhill
2007	15 March 2007	Lenzerheide, Switzerland	Super-G
2007	17 March 2007	Lenzerheide, Switzerland	Giant slalom
2008	28 October 2007	Sölden, Austria	Giant slalom
2008	25 November 2007	Lake Louise, Canada	Super-G
2009	5 December 2008	(United States) Beaver Creek, USA	Downhill
2009	6 December 2008	(United States) Beaver Creek, USA	Super-G
2009	11 March 2009	Åre, Sweden	Downhill
2010	18 December 2009	Val Gardena, Italy	Super-G
2011	8 January 2011	Adelboden, Switzerland	Giant slalom
2012	27 November 2011	Lake Louise, Canada	Super-G
2012	14 March 2012	Schladming, Austria	Downhill
2013	24 November 2012	Lake Louise, Canada	Downhill
2013	25 November 2012	Lake Louise, Canada	Super-G
2013	14 December 2012	Val Gardena, Italy	Super-G
2013	25 January 2013	Kitzbühel, Austria	Super-G
2013	3 March 2013	Kvitfjell, Norway	Super-G
2014	1 December 2013	Lake Louise, Canada	Super-G
2014	6 December 2013	(United States) Beaver Creek, USA	Downhill
2014	20 December 2013	Val Gardena, Italy	Super-G
2014	29 December 2013	Bormio, Italy	Downhill
2016	28 November 2015	Lake Louise, Canada	Downhill
2016	29 November 2015	Lake Louise, Canada	Super-G
2016	4 December 2015	(United States) Beaver Creek, USA	Downhill
2016	18 December 2015	Val Gardena, Italy	Super-G
2016	19 December 2015	Val Gardena, Italy	Downhill
2016	16 January 2016	Wengen, Switzerland	Downhill
2016	22 January 2016	Kitzbühel, Austria	Super-G
2018	2 December 2017	(United States) Beaver Creek, USA	Downhill
2018	16 December 2017	Val Gardena, Italy	Downhill
2018	19 January 2018	Kitzbühel, Austria	Super-G
2019	14 December 2018	Val Gardena, Italy	Super-G

== World Championship results ==
Year	Age	Slalom	Giant slalom	Super-G	Downhill	Combined
2003	20	–	5	DNF	22	—
2005	22	12	6	7	7	2
2007	24	DNF1	1	13	1	5
2009	26	—	9	3	11	1
2011	28	—	4	DNF	5	1
2013	30	—	4	3	1	DNF2
2015	32	—	—	6	6	—
2017	34	did not compete				
2019	36	—	—	16	2	—

== Olympic results ==
Year	Age	Slalom	Giant slalom	Super-G	Downhill	Combined
2006	23	DNF2	6	5	21	DNF SL1
2010	27	—	3	1	2	DNF2
2014	31	—	—	7	4	8
2018	35	—	—	5	1	DNS2

Olympic Games
Preceded by Tommy Jakobsen	Flagbearer for Norway; Sochi 2014	Succeeded by Emil Hegle Svendsen
