= Filip Forejtek =

Czech alpine skier (born 1997)

Personal information
- Nationality: Czech
- Born: 3 November 1997 (age 28)

Sport
- Sport: Alpine skiing

Filip Forejtek (born 3 November 1997 in Plzeň) is a Czech alpine skier. He competed in the 2018 Winter Olympics.

== Biography ==
His brother Jonáš is a professional tennis player, his mother's father Pavel Macenauer represented Czechoslovakia in tennis singles at the 1924 Olympic Games. In January 2018, he became the Czech champion in the combined event, and in the junior category, he won 5th place in the downhill at the World Junior Championships and thus received an additional nomination for the 2018 Winter Olympics in Pyeongchang. At the Olympics, Forejtek placed 31st in the giant slalom, 34th in the super-G and 38th in the downhill.
