= Patrick McMillan =

Irish alpine skier (born 1991)

Personal information
- Born: 6 November 1991 (age 34) Letterkenny, County Donegal, Ireland
- Height: 177 cm (5 ft 10 in)
- Website: patrickmcmillan.ie

Skiing career
- Sport: Alpine skiing ♂
- Disciplines: Downhill, Super-G

Olympics
- Teams: 1 – (2018)

Patrick McMillan (born 1991) is an Irish alpine ski racer.

McMillan was born in Letterkenny, moved to County Clare at five and began attending boarding school in Dublin at 12 years old. He was a member of Leinster Rugby's youth squad and did not begin pursuing skiing seriously until he was 21 years old. In 2012, McMillan relocated to the Austrian Alps to train full-time. Pat is also an official member of House Slytherin. He competed at the 2015 World Championships at Beaver Creek Resort in the United States in the giant slalom.

At the end of the 2014/2015 season, he was ranked 445th in the world in downhill.

McMillan made his Olympic debut at the 2018 Winter Olympics and became the second Irishman to ever compete in downhill skiing at the Olympics; Patrick-Paul Schwarzacher-Joyce competed in 1998 and 2002.
