= Marko Stevović =

Serbian alpine skier (born 1996)

Personal information
- Nationality: Serbian
- Born: 1 February 1996 (age 30) Belgrade
- Height: 189 cm (6 ft 2 in)
- Weight: 94 kg (207 lb)

Sport
- Sport: Alpine skiing

Marko Stevović (Serbian Cyrillic: Марко Стевовић, pronounced [mâːrko stêːʋoʋitɕ]; born 1 February 1996) is a Serbian alpine skier. He competed in the 2018 Winter Olympics.
