= Gerard Escoda (alpine skier) =

Andorran alpine skier (born 1970)

Personal information
- Full name: Gerard Escoda Alegret
- Born: 8 September 1970 (age 56) Escaldes-Engordany, Andorra

Sport
- Country: Andorra
- Sport: Alpine skiing

Gerard Escoda Alegret (Note: In this Catalan name, the first or paternal surname is Escoda and the second or maternal family name is Alegret; both are generally joined by the conjunction "i".) (born 8 September 1970) is an Andorran alpine skier. He competed at the 1988, 1992, 1994 and the 1998 Winter Olympics.
