= Vicky Grau =

Andorran alpine skier (born 1975)

Personal information
- Full name: Vicky Grau Muxella
- Born: 8 April 1975 (age 49); Sant Julià de Lòria, Andorra

Sport
- Country: Andorra
- Sport: Alpine skiing

Vicky Grau Muxella (Note: In this Catalan name, the first or paternal surname is Grau and the second or maternal family name is Muxella; both are generally joined by the conjunction "i".) (born 8 April 1975) is an Andorran alpine skier. She competed at the 1992, 1994, 1998 and the 2002 Winter Olympics.

She is the sister of alpine skier Sandra Grau.
