= Alpine skiing at the Winter World University Games =

- Events: 10 (men: 5; women: 5)

Games
- 1959; 1960; 1961; 1962; 1963; 1964; 1965; 1966; 1967; 1968; 1970; 1970; 1973; 1972; 1975; 1975; 1977; 1978; 1979; 1981; 1983; 1985; 1987; 1989; 1991; 1993; 1995; 1997; 1999; 2001; 2003; 2005; 2007; 2009; 2011; 2013; 2015; 2017; 2019; 2023; 2025

Alpine skiing is one of the nine compulsory sports of the Winter Universiade, in addition to cross-country skiing. Skiing was present in all editions of the event beginning in 1960.

== Events ==
Event	60	62	64	66	68	70	72	75	78	83	85	87	89	91	93	95	97	99	01	03	05	07	09	11	13	15	17	Years
Men's downhill	•	•	•	•	•			•	•	•	•	•	•	•		•	•	•		•	•		•		•			19
Men's super-G													•		•		•	•	•	•	•	•	•	•	•	•	•	13
Men's giant slalom	•		•	•	•	•	•	•	•	•	•	•	•	•	•	•	•	•	•	•	•	•	•	•	•	•	•	26
Men's slalom	•	•	•	•	•	•	•	•	•	•	•	•	•	•	•	•	•	•	•	•	•	•	•	•	•	•	•	27
Men's combined	•	•	•	•	•	•	•	•	•	•		•	•	•	•	•	•	•	•	•	•	•	•			•	•	24
Men's combined classification																								•	•	•	•	4
Men's super combined																								•				1
Women's downhill	•	•	•	•	•			•	•	•	•	•	•	•		•	•	•		•	•		•		•			19
Women's super-G													•		•		•	•	•	•	•	•	•	•	•	•	•	13
Women's giant slalom		•	•	•	•	•	•	•	•	•	•	•	•	•	•	•	•	•	•	•	•	•	•	•	•	•	•	26
Women's slalom	•	•	•	•	•	•	•	•	•	•	•	•	•	•	•	•	•	•	•	•	•	•	•	•	•	•	•	27
Women's combined	•	•	•	•	•	•	•	•	•	•		•	•	•	•	•	•	•	•	•	•	•	•			•	•	24
Women's combined classification																								•	•	•	•	4
Women's super combined																								•				1
Mixed team																											•	1

== Medalists ==
=== Men ===
==== Downhill ====
Year	Gold	Silver	Bronze
1960	(Austria) Manfred Köstinger	(Austria) Walter Kutschera	(Austria) Heinz Gallob
1962	(France) Philippe Mollard	(Austria) Walter Kutschera	(Germany) Willy Bogner
1964	(Germany) Fritz Wagnerberger	(Germany) Günter Scheuerl	(Austria) Manfred Kostinger
1966	(France) Bob Wollek	(United States) Mike Allsop	(Germany) Franz Vogler
1968	(United States) Scott Pyles	(Germany) Günter Scheuerl	(United States) Loris Werner
1970–1972	not included in the program		
1975	(Italy) Bruno Confortola	(Austria) Werner Margreiter	(Italy) Renato Antonioli
1978	(Italy) Franco Marconi	(Austria) Werner Margreiter	(Austria) Christian Witt-Doering
1981	(Soviet Union) Valery Tsyganov	(Soviet Union) Sergei Tchaadaev	(Italy) Giovanni Beccari
1983	(Switzerland) Denis Du Pasquier	(Italy) Giovanni Beccari	(Czechoslovakia) Peter Soltya
1985	(Italy) Igor Cigolla	(Germany) Jens Dinser	(Italy) Ivano Marzola
1987	(Czechoslovakia) Peter Jurko	(Italy) Alberto Nencetti	(Switzerland) Guido Purtschert
1989	(Czechoslovakia) Marian Bires	(Italy) Guido Singer	(Germany) Jens Dinser
1991	(Austria) Thomas Schaschl	(Austria) Claus Bretschneider	(United States) Briggs G. Phillips
1993	not included in the program		
1995	(France) Stephane Aubonnet	(Sweden) Magnus Oja	(Austria) Eric Wolf
1997	(Switzerland) Luca Vidi	(Slovenia) Miran Rautner	(Slovenia) David De'Costa
1999	(Sweden) Lars Lewen	(Switzerland) Claudio Calonder	(Sweden) Nicklas Naeaes
2001	Cancelled		
2003	(Slovenia) Ozbi Oslak	(Slovenia) Andrej Sporn	(Russia) Pavel Chestakov
2005	(Slovenia) Matija Grasic	(Austria) Arno Pechtl	(France) Cyprien Brun
2007	Cancelled		
2009	(Switzerland) Sandro Boner	(Austria) Michael Sablatnik	(Switzerland) Christoph Boner
2011	not included in the program		
2013	(Italy) Davide Cazzaniga	(France) Blaise Giezendanner	(Italy) Guglielmo Bosca
2015–2027	not included in the program		

==== Super-G ====
Year	Gold	Silver	Bronze
1960–1987	not included in the program		
1989	(France) Stephane Mougin	(Austria) Hans Peter Grill	(Germany) Jens Dinser
1991	not included in the program		
1993	(Switzerland) Didier Plaschy	(Italy) Martin Kreil	(Austria) Eric Wolf
1995	not included in the program		
1997	(Slovenia) Miran Rauter	(Switzerland) Luca Vidi	(Russia) Roman Valyaev
1999	(Russia) Pavel Chestakov	(Sweden) Lars Lewen	(Slovenia) Jernej Rebersak
2001	(Slovenia) Bernard Vajdic	(Slovenia) Ozbi Oslak	(Russia) Pavel Chestakov
2003	(Russia) Sergei Komarov	(Slovenia) Ozbi Oslak	(Slovakia) Ivan Heimschild
2005	(Italy) Francesco Ghedina	(Austria) Dominik Schweiger	(Russia) Anton Konovalov
2007	(Czech Republic) Petr Záhrobský	(Czech Republic) Filip Trejbal	(United States) Adam Cole
2009	(Switzerland) Sandro Boner	(Slovakia) Jaroslav Babusiak	(Switzerland) Christoph Boner
2011	(Czech Republic) Adam Zika	(Sweden) Carl Lind	(Austria) Bernhard Graf
2013	(France) Blaise Giezendanner	(France) Nicolas Raffort	(Italy) Guglielmo Bosca
2015	(Italy) Michelangelo Tentori	(Andorra) Marc Oliveras	(Switzerland) Sandro Boner
2017	(Italy) Michelangelo Tentori	(Russia) Evgeny Pyasik	(Russia) Semyon Efimov
2019	(Switzerland) Lukas Zippert	(Czech Republic) Tomas Klinsky	(Switzerland) Yannick Chabloz
2023	(Czech Republic) Jan Zabystřan	(Italy) Luca Taranzano	(Switzerland) Eric Wyler
2025	(Spain) Ander Mintegui	(Sweden) Emil Nyberg	(France) Jonas Skabar
2027			

==== Giant slalom ====
Year	Gold	Silver	Bronze
1960	(Switzerland) Philippe Stern	(Switzerland) Walther Herwig	(Switzerland) Klaus Herwig
1962	not included in the program		
1964	(Poland) Jerzy Woyna Orlewicz	(Japan) Tomii Hajime	(Germany) Fritz Wagnerberger
1966	(France) Bob Wollek	(Poland) Andrzej Bachleda	(Italy) Luigi Pezza
1968	(Norway) Per Sunde	(Czechoslovakia) Milan Pazout	(Germany) Franz Vogler
1970	(United States) Eric Poulsen	(Poland) Andrzej Bachleda	(Germany) Franz Vogler
1972	(Poland) Andrzej Bachleda	(Sweden) Roger Ahlm	(Germany) Franz Vogler
1975	(Italy) Fausto Radici	(Italy) Bruno Confortola	(France) Jean-Pierre Puthod
1978	(Czechoslovakia) Bohumir Zeman	(France) Patrice Ciprelli	(Austria) Peter Rupitsch
1981	(Czechoslovakia) Bohumir Zeman	(Socialist Federal Republic of Yugoslavia) Tomaz Cerkovnik	(Bulgaria) Peter Popangelov
1983	(Spain) Carlos Salvadores	(Bulgaria) Mitko Hadijev	(Switzerland) Hans Gruther
1985	(Socialist Federal Republic of Yugoslavia) Jure Franko	(Socialist Federal Republic of Yugoslavia) Boris Strel	(Spain) Carlos Salvadores
1987	(Czechoslovakia) Peter Jurko	(Bulgaria) Peter Popangelov	(United States) Terry Delliquadri
1989	(Socialist Federal Republic of Yugoslavia) Klemen Bergant	(Bulgaria) Borislav Dimitratschkov	(United States) Dean W. Keller
1991	(Czechoslovakia) Peter Jurko	(United States) Toni Standteiner	(Japan) Keiji Oshigiri
1993	(United States) Skip Merrick	(France) Francois Simond	(Austria) Hans Peter Gill
1995	(Sweden) Anders Wiggerud	(Japan) Joji Kawaguchi	(Italy) Gianluca Grigoleto
1997	(Slovenia) Uros Pavlovcic	(Austria) Stefan Lanziner	(Slovenia) Miran Rauter
1999	(France) Jean-Pierre Vidal	(Slovenia) Uros Pavlovcic	(Slovenia) Jernej Rebersak
2001	(United States) David Viele	(Sweden) Pierre Olsson	(Russia) Pavel Chestakov
2003	(Slovenia) Miha Malus	(Italy) Nicholas Bolner	(Finland) Tommi Viirret
2005	(Austria) Dominik Schweiger	(United States) Warner Nickerson	(Italy) Francesco Ghedina
2007	(Italy) Aronne Pieruz	(Czech Republic) Filip Trejbal	(United States) Adam Cole
2009	(Switzerland) Dimitri Cuche	(Japan) Ryuunosuke Ohkoshi	(France) Jonathan Midol
2011	(Austria) Bernhard Graf	(Czech Republic) Adam Zika	(Sweden) Douglas Hedin
2013	(France) Jonas Fabre	(France) Thibaut Favrot (Italy) Giulio Bosca	Not awarded
2015	(Italy) Michelangelo Tentori	(Italy) Rocco Delsante	(France) Jonas Fabre
2017	(Italy) Giulio Bosca	(Switzerland) Jöel Mueller	(Switzerland) Cédric Noger
2019	(Russia) Ivan Kuznetsov	(Italy) Alberto Blengini	(Switzerland) Livio Simonet
2023	(Czech Republic) Jan Zabystřan	(Switzerland) Eric Wyler	(France) Jérémie Lagier
2025	(Spain) Aleix Serracanta	(Switzerland) Löic Chable	(Switzerland) Nick Spoerri
2027			

==== Slalom ====
Year	Gold	Silver	Bronze
1960	(Switzerland) Walther Herwig	(Czechoslovakia) Sbynek Mohr	(France) Bernard Cottet
1962	(Germany) Willy Bogner	(Finland) Ulf Ekstam	(Japan) Nasayoshi Mitani
1964	(Germany) Fritz Wagnerberger	(Japan) Yoshiharu Fukuhara	(Soviet Union) Taliy Monastyrev
1966	(Poland) Andrzej Bachleda	(France) Bob Wollek	(Poland) Jerzy Woyna Orlewicz
1968	(Czechoslovakia) Milan Pazout	(Norway) Per Sunde	(United States) Bill Marolt
1970	(Germany) Christian Neureuther	(United States) Eric Poulsen	(France) Serge Ramus
1972	(Poland) Roman Dereziński	(Japan) Masayoshi Kashiwagi	(France) F Thomas
1975	(France) Philippe Hardy	(Italy) Fausto Radici	(Italy) Bruno Confortola
1978	(Poland) Maciej Gąsienica Ciaptak	(Poland) Jan Bachleda	(Italy) Paolo De Chiesa
1981	(Bulgaria) Peter Popangelov	(Socialist Federal Republic of Yugoslavia) Tomaz Cerkovnik	(France) Patrick Blanc
1983	(Bulgaria) Peter Popangelov	(France) Christian Gaidet	(Soviet Union) Leonid Melnikov
1985	(Italy) Marco Tonazzi	(Bulgaria) Peter Popangelov	(Italy) Carlo Gerosa
1987	(Bulgaria) Peter Popangelov	(Austria) Juergen Grabher	(Socialist Federal Republic of Yugoslavia) Grega Benedik
1989	(Italy) Alberto Ghezze	(Bulgaria) Borislav Dimitratschkov	(Switzerland) Urs Karrer
1991	(Japan) Kiminobu Kimura	(Czechoslovakia) Peter Jurko	(Spain) Ricardo Campo Galindo
1993	(Switzerland) Urs Karrer	(Japan) Kazuo Takefushi	(Japan) Hideaki Ito
1995	(Italy) Elmar Castlunger	(Finland) Petri Heikkala	(Sweden) Magnus Oja
1997	(Sweden) Emil Englund	(Switzerland) Michel Bortis	(Slovenia) Uros Pavlovcic
1999	(Austria) Kilian Albrecht	(Czech Republic) Tomas Kraus	(France) Jean Pierre Vidal
2001	(Slovenia) Andrej Sporn	(Austria) Martin Kroisleitner	(Slovenia) Bernard Vajdic
2003	(Switzerland) Michael Weyermann	(Austria) Martin Kroisleitner	(Japan) Shuta Hoshino
2005	(Czech Republic) Martin Vrablik	(Switzerland) Michael Weyermann	(Slovenia) Andrei Sporn
2007	(Czech Republic) Filip Trejbal	(Slovenia) Matic Skube	(Sweden) Petter Robertsson
2009	(Switzerland) Dimitri Cuche	(Italy) Manuel Pescollderungg	(France) Jonathan Midol
2011	(United States) Josef Stiegler	(Slovenia) Filip Mlinsek	(Sweden) Carl Lind
2013	(Finland) Joonas Räsänen	(Slovakia) Adam Žampa	(Czech Republic) Kryštof Krýzl
2015	(Switzerland) Ramon Zenhäusern	(Slovakia) Matej Falat	(Slovenia) Filip Mlinšek
2017	(Austria) Richard Leitgeb	(Austria) Bernhard Binderitsch	(Austria) Tobias Kogler
2019	(Russia) Simon Efimov	(Austria) Richard Leitgeb	(France) Paco Rassat
2023	(Czech Republic) Jan Zabystřan	(France) Jérémie Lagier	(United States) Jacob Dilling
2025	(Japan) Takayuki Koyama	(Italy) Stefano Pizzato	(France) Paul Silvestre
2027			

==== Combined ====
Year	Gold	Silver	Bronze
1960	(Austria) Heinz Gallob	(Italy) Pier Giorgio Vigliani	(Socialist Federal Republic of Yugoslavia) Peter Lakota
1962	(Germany) Willy Bogner	(France) Philippe Mollard	(Austria) Manfred Kostinger
1964	(Germany) Fritz Wagnerberger	(Germany) Günter Scheuerl	(Poland) Jerzy Woyna Orlewicz
1966	(France) Bob Wollek	(Poland) Andrzej Bachleda	(Poland) Jerzy Woyna Orlewicz
1968	(Czechoslovakia) Milan Pazout	(France) Bob Wollek	(United States) Scott Pyles
1970	(United States) Eric Poulsen	(Poland) Andrzej Bachleda	(Germany) Franz Vogler
1972	(France) Eric Stahl	(Austria) Hans Tesar	(Austria) Michal Schlegel
1975	(Italy) Bruno Confortola	(France) Philip Hardy	(Liechtenstein) Herbert Marxer
1978	(Czechoslovakia) Bohumir Zeman	(Poland) Maciej Gąsienica Ciaptak	(France) Patrice Ciprelli
1981	(France) Patrick Blanc	(Czechoslovakia) Bohumir Zeman	(Italy) Massimo Provera
1983	(France) Christian Gaidet	(Soviet Union) Leonid Melnikov	(Bulgaria) Hristo Angelov
1985	not included in the program		
1987	(Czechoslovakia) Peter Jurko	(Austria) Juergen Grabher	(Japan) Masayuki Akiba
1989	(Socialist Federal Republic of Yugoslavia) Klemen Bergant	(Socialist Federal Republic of Yugoslavia) Urban Planisek	(Czechoslovakia) Martin Vokaty
1991	(Czechoslovakia) Peter Jurko	(United States) Briggs G. Phillips	(Austria) Thomas Schaschl
1993	(Switzerland) Urs Karrer	(Italy) Alberto Pivato	(Austria) Hans Peter Gill
1995	(Japan) Joji Kawaguchi	(Italy) Gian Luca Grigoleto	(France) Francois Duvillard
1997	(Slovenia) Miran Rauter	(Sweden) Magnus Oja	(Austria) Stefan Lanziner
1999	(Sweden) Lars Lewen	(Austria) Stefan Lanziner	(Sweden) Henrik Lundstroem
2001	(Slovenia) Bernard Vajdic	(Russia) Pavel Chestakov	(Austria) Stefan Lanziner
2003	(Austria) Martin Kroisleitner	(Russia) Sergei Komarov	(Slovenia) Ozbi Oslak
2005	(Austria) Dominik Schweiger	(United States) Warner Nickerson	(Czech Republic) Martin Vrablik
2007	(Czech Republic) Filip Trejbal	(United States) Adam Cole	(United States) Tague Thorson
2009	(Switzerland) Sandro Boner	(France) Jonathan Midol	(Slovakia) Jaroslav Babusiak
2011–2013	not included in the program		
2015	(Switzerland) Sandro Boner	(Italy) Giulio Bosca	(Slovakia) Matej Falat
2017	(Latvia) Kristaps Zvejinieks	(Netherlands) Marteen Meiners	(Slovakia) Matej Falat
2019	(Switzerland) Yannick Chabloz	(Russia) Anton Endzhievskiy	(Russia) Nikita Alekhin
2023	(Spain) Albert Ortega	(Lithuania) Andrej Drukarov	(Czech Republic) Jan Zabystřan
2025	(Switzerland) Loïc Chable	(France) Jonas Skabar	(Spain) Tomás Barata Mercadal
2027	not included in the program		

==== Combined classification ====
Year	Gold	Silver	Bronze
1960–2009	not included in the program		
2011	(Czech Republic) Adam Zika	(United States) Seppi Stiegler	(Slovenia) Filip Mlinsek
2013	(Monaco) Olivier Jenot	(France) Blaise Giezendanner	(Czech Republic) Ondrej Berndt
2015	(Switzerland) Sandro Boner	(Czech Republic) Adam Zika	(Italy) Michelangelo Tentori
2017–2025	not included in the program		

==== Super combined ====
Year	Gold	Silver	Bronze
1960–2009	not included in the program		
2011	(Austria) Bernhard Graf	(Sweden) Calle Lindh	(Czech Republic) Adam Zika
2013–2023	not included in the program		

==== Team Combined ====
Year	Gold	Silver	Bronze
2027			

==== Carving ====
Year	Gold	Silver	Bronze
2003	(Italy) Enrico Barotti	(Italy) Matej Crismanicich	(Italy) Francesco Borseti

=== Men's Para Alpine Skiing ===
==== VI ====
Year	Gold	Silver	Bronze
2025	(Poland) Michal Golas	(Germany) Alexander Rauen	Only two competitors

==== Standing ====
Year	Gold	Silver	Bronze
2025	(France) Oscar Burnham	(France) Arthur Bauchet	(France) Jules Segers

==== Sitting ====
Year	Gold	Silver	Bronze
2025	(Chile) Nicholas Bisquertt Hudson	(Slovenia) Jernej Slivnik	(Germany) Leon Elias Gensert

==== VI ====
Year	Gold	Silver	Bronze
2025	(Poland) Michal Golas	(Germany) Alexander Rauen	Only two competitors

==== Standing ====
Year	Gold	Silver	Bronze
2025	(France) Arthur Bauchet	(France) Jules Segers	(France) Oscar Burnham

==== Sitting ====
Year	Gold	Silver	Bronze
2025	(Slovenia) Jernej Slivnik	(Chile) Nicholas Bisquertt Hudson	(Germany) Leon Elias Gensert

=== Women ===
==== Downhill ====
Year	Gold	Silver	Bronze
1960	(France) Marie-José Dusonchet	(Austria) Gertraud Gaber	(Italy) Franca Quaglia
1962	(West Germany) Barbi Henneberger	(Austria) Gertraud Ehrenfried	(France) Cécile Prince
1964	(France) Annie Famose	(Austria) Hiltrud Rohbrach	(France) Pascale Judet
1966	(Switzerland) Theres Obrecht	(United States) Jean Saubert	(Switzerland) Heidi Obrecht
1968	(Switzerland) Heidi Obrecht	(Austria) Christina Dietfurth	(Italy) Paola Strauss
1970–1972	not included in the program		
1975	(Switzerland) Irene Boehm	(France) Brigitte Jeandel	(Italy) Carmen Rosoleni
1978	(Italy) Maddalena Silvestri	(Switzerland) Irene Boehm	(Italy) Giuliana Campiglia
1981	(Soviet Union) Marina Antonova-Yunusova	(Italy) Maddalena Silvestri	(France) Nadine Chevassus
1983	(Czechoslovakia) Jana Gantnerova-Soltysova	(Czechoslovakia) Olga Charvatova	(France) Marie-Luce Waldmeir
1985	(Czechoslovakia) Olga Charvatova	(Czechoslovakia) Jana Gantnerova-Soltysova	(Spain) Blanca Fernández Ochoa
1987	(Czechoslovakia) Ludmila Milanova	(United States) Sondra van Ert	(United States) Eva Pfosi
1989	(Austria) Christine Zangerl	(Austria) Ulrike Vorderegger	(Soviet Union) Natalia Buga
1991	(Germany) Katrin Stotz	(United States) Tracy Mc Ewan	(United Kingdom) Ingrid Grant
1993	not included in the program		
1995	(Russia) Anna Larionova	(France) Marianne Brechu	(France) Chrystelle Felisaz
1997	(Slovenia) Andreja Potisk-Ribic	(Slovenia) Anja Kalan	(United States) Katherine Davenport
1999	(France) Eloise Bernard	(Russia) Ksenia Shlyakhtina	(Russia) Ekaterina Nesterenko
2001	Cancelled		
2003	(Czech Republic) Gabriela Martinovova	(Russia) Anastasia Popkova	(United Kingdom) Amanda Pirie
2005	(Serbia and Montenegro) Jelena Lolovic	(Czech Republic) Lucie Hrstkova	(Russia) Tatyana Blagulyak
2007	Cancelled		
2009	(Switzerland) Tamara Wolf	(Switzerland) Mirena Kueng	(Japan) Chika Kato
2011	not included in the program		
2013	(Russia) Valentina Golenkova	(Slovakia) Jana Gantnerova	(Poland) Karolina Chrapek
2015–2025	not included in the program		

==== Super-G ====
Year	Gold	Silver	Bronze
1960–1987	not included in the program		
1989	(Soviet Union) Natalia Buga	(Switzerland) Maria-Theresa Pinorini	(Italy) Monica Borsotti
1991	not included in the program		
1993	(France) Catherine Chedal	(Italy) Michaela Messner	(United States) Shannon Nobis
1995	not included in the program		
1997	(Slovenia) Anja Kalan	(Slovenia) Andreja Potisk-Ribic	(United States) Jessica Ochs
1999	(Russia) Ksenia Schlyakhtina	(Russia) Olesya Alieva	(Czech Republic) Karolina Sedova
2001	(Switzerland) Linda Alpiger	(Switzerland) Lea Nadig	(United Kingdom) Tessa Pirie
2003	(Italy) Alessandra Merlin	(Czech Republic) Tereza Trtikova	(Russia) Anastasia Popkova
2005	(Czech Republic) Lucie Hrstkova	(Serbia and Montenegro) Jelena Lolovic	(Japan) Emiko Kiyosawa
2007	(Italy) Giulia Gianesini	(Italy) Alessia Pittin	(Slovenia) Petra Robnik
2009	(Switzerland) Tamara Wolf	(France) Pauline Socquet-Clerc	(Czech Republic) Lucie Hrstkova
2011	(United States) Katie Hartman	(Poland) Karolina Chrapek	(Italy) Chiara Carratu
2013	(Italy) Giulia Borghetti	(Poland) Karolina Chrapek	(Russia) Valentina Golenkova
2015	(Norway) Kristine Fausa Aasberg	(Poland) Karolina Chrapek	(Sweden) Helena Rapaport
2017	(Russia) Elena Yakovishina	(Finland) Nea Luukko	(Japan) Asa Ando
2019	(Austria) Jessica Gfrerer	(Switzerland) Amelie Dupasquier	(Sweden) Fanny Axelsson
2023	(Germany) Fabiana Dorigo	(Norway) Carmen Sofie Nielssen	(Spain) Celia Abad
2025	(France) Louison Accambray	(Sweden) Sophie Nyeberg	(France) Emy Charbonnier

==== Giant slalom ====
Year	Gold	Silver	Bronze
1960	not included in the program		
1962	(West Germany) Barbi Henneberger	(Norway) Astrid Sandvik	(France) Annie Famose (Austria) Gertraud Ehrenfried
1964	(Austria) Hiltrud Rohbrach	(Switzerland) Heidi Obrecht	(France) Cécile Prince
1966	(France) Annie Famose	(Switzerland) Theres Obrecht	(United States) Jean Saubert
1968	(United States) Cathy Nagel	(United States) Viki Jones	(Italy) Marisella Chevallard
1970	(United States) Rose Fortna	(United States) Karen Korfanta	(Austria) Dietlind Klos
1972	(Germany) Franziska Friedel	(United States) Pam Reed	(France) Pascale Tremoulet
1975	(France) Fabienne Jourdain	(Italy) Patrizia Ravelli	(Czechoslovakia) Zusana Sosvaldova
1978	(Czechoslovakia) Dagmar Kuzmanova	(Italy) Giuliana Campiglia	(Switzerland) Irene Boehm
1981	(France) Perrine Pelen	(Italy) Claudia Giordani	(Italy) Maddalena Silvestri
1983	(Italy) Daniela Zini	(Czechoslovakia) Olga Charvatova	(Poland) Małgorzata Tlałka
1985	(Spain) Blanca Fernández Ochoa	(Italy) Daniela Zini	(Czechoslovakia) Olga Charvatova
1987	(Czechoslovakia) Ludmila Milanova	(Czechoslovakia) Ivana Valesova	(Socialist Federal Republic of Yugoslavia) Andreja Leskovsek
1989	(Czechoslovakia) Monika Hojstricova	(Czechoslovakia) Ludmila Milanova	(Soviet Union) Natalia Buga
1991	(Switzerland) Corinne Schmidhauser	(Socialist Federal Republic of Yugoslavia) Katja Lesjak	(Poland) Katarzyna Szafrańska
1993	(Germany) Katrin Stotz	(Italy) Sonia Colle	(United States) Shannon Nobis
1995	(Spain) Monica Bosch	(France) Marianne Brechu	(Sweden) Lotta Berglund
1997	(Slovenia) Andreja Potisk-Ribic	(Japan) Junko Yamakawa	(Italy) Roberta Pergher
1999	(Sweden) Susanne Ekman	(Slovakia) Maria Kvopkova	(Italy) Tiziana De Martin
2001	(Poland) Dagmara Krzyżyńska	(Spain) Ana Geli Espana	(Japan) Hiromi Yumoto
2003	(Russia) Anastasia Popkova	(Italy) Beatrice Boglio	(Serbia and Montenegro) Jelena Lolovic
2005	(Poland) Dagmara Krzyżyńska	(Serbia and Montenegro) Jelena Lolovic	(Czech Republic) Lucie Hrstkova
2007	(Italy) Camilla Alfieri	(Slovenia) Ana Kobal	(Liechtenstein) Sarah Schädler
2009	(Japan) Mizue Hoshi	(France) Anne-Sophie Barthet	(Poland) Katarzyna Karasińska
2011	(United States) Jennie Vanwagner	(Italy) Lucia Mazzotti	(Poland) Karolina Chrapek
2013	(Poland) Maryna Gąsienica-Daniel	(Austria) Michelle Morik	(Sweden) Veronica Smedh
2015	(Norway) Kristine Fausa Aasberg	(Poland) Sabina Majerczyk	(Andorra) Carmina Pallas
2017	(Japan) Asa Ando	(Slovenia) Desiree Ajlec	(Belarus) Maria Shkanova
2019	(Russia) Ekaterina Tkachenko	(Austria) Denise Dingsleder	(Russia) Yulia Pleshkova
2023	(Germany) Leonie Flötgen	(Germany) Fabiana Dorigo	(Sweden) Emma Hammergård

==== Slalom ====
Year	Gold	Silver	Bronze
1960	(France) Cécile Prince	(France) Marie-José Dusonchet	(Austria) Randl Legatt
1962	(France) Cécile Prince	(West Germany) Barbi Henneberger	(France) Annie Famose
1964	(France) Annie Famose	(France) Pascale Judet	(Switzerland) Heidi Obrecht
1966	(France) Annie Famose	(Switzerland) Theres Obrecht	(Austria) Christina Dietfurth
1968	(United States) Cathy Nagel	(United States) Viki Jones	(Austria) Christina Dietfurth
1970	(United States) Rose Fortna	(United States) Ann Black	(Austria) Traute Hacker
1972	(Italy) Anahid Tasgian	(United States) Caryn West	(Austria) Barbl Edelsbrunner
1975	(Soviet Union) Aleftina Askarova	(France) Brigitte Jeandel	(Italy) Patrizia Ravelli
1978	event cancelled		
1981	(Italy) Claudia Giordani	(Czechoslovakia) Katarina Zibrinova	(Italy) Giuliana Campiglia
1983	(Italy) Daniela Zini	(Socialist Federal Republic of Yugoslavia) Anja Zavadlav	(Poland) Małgorzata Tlałka
1985	(Italy) Nadia Bonfini	(Poland) Dorota Tlałka	(Poland) Małgorzata Tlałka
1987	(Czechoslovakia) Ivana Valesova	(Socialist Federal Republic of Yugoslavia) Natasa Bokal	(Socialist Federal Republic of Yugoslavia) Katja Lesjak
1989	(Socialist Federal Republic of Yugoslavia) Natasa Bokal	(Italy) Monica Borsottil	(United States) Heidi Dahlgren
1991	(Canada) Josee Lacasse	(Switzerland) Corinne Schmidhauser	(France) Pascaline Freiher
1993	(United States) Shannon Nobis	(Germany) Katrin Stotz	(Austria) Eva Jenner
1995	(Spain) Monica Bosch	(France) Isabelle Fabre	(Switzerland) Dominique Gruber
1997	(Japan) Junko Yamakawa	(Italy) Roberta Pergher	(Sweden) Anna Beischer
1999	(Italy) Tiziana De Martin	(United States) Elizabeth Sherry	(Sweden) Susanne Ekman
2001	(Poland) Dagmara Krzyżyńska	(Slovenia) Mojca Rataj	(Slovenia) Petra Svet
2003	(Sweden) Kristina Hultdin	(Italy) Claudia Morandini	(United States) Erika Hogan
2005	(Switzerland) Aita Camastral	(Japan) Hiromi Yumoto	(Czech Republic) Lucie Hrstkova
2007	(Poland) Katarzyna Karasińska	(Poland) Aleksandra Kluś	(Slovenia) Alenka Kuerner (Slovenia) Petra Robnik
2009	(Poland) Katarzyna Karasińska	(Switzerland) Eliane Volken	(Poland) Aleksandra Kluś
2011	(United States) Sterling Grant	(Poland) Aleksandra Kluś	(Slovakia) Jana Gantnerova
2013	(Serbia) Nevena Ignjatovic	(Switzerland) Margaux Givel	(Czech Republic) Martina Dubovska
2015	(Norway) Thea Grosvold	(Germany) Monica Huebner	(Canada) Eve Routhier
2017	(Belarus) Maria Shkanova	(Germany) Monica Huebner	(Sweden) Louise Jansson
2019	(Russia) Ekaterina Tkachenko	(Austria) Denise Dingsleder	(Russia) Anastasia Gornostaeva
2023	(Italy) Carlotta Marcora	(Switzerland) Valentine Macheret	(Sweden) Sara Rask
2025	(Switzerland) Sue Piller	(Switzerland) Amelie Klopfenstein	(Italy) Margherita Cecere

==== Combined ====
Year	Gold	Silver	Bronze
1960	(France) Marie-José Dusonchet	(France) Cécile Prince	(Austria) Gertraud Gaber
1962	(West Germany) Barbi Henneberger	(France) Cécile Prince	(Austria) Gundl Sernetz
1964	(Switzerland) Heidi Obrecht	(Austria) Hiltrud Rohbrach	(Romania) llona Miclos
1966	(Switzerland) Theres Obrecht	(France) Annie Famose	(Switzerland) Heidi Obrecht
1968	(United States) Cathy Nagel	(United States) Viki Jones	(Austria) Christina Dietfurth
1970	(United States) Rose Fortna	(United States) Karen Korfanta	(United States) Ann Black
1972	(United States) Caryn West	(Italy) Anahid Tasgian	(Austria) Barbl Edelsbrunner
1975	(Switzerland) Irene Boehm	(France) Brigitte Jeandel	(Italy) Carmen Rosoleni
1978	(France) Caroline Attia	(Switzerland) Irene Boehm	(Austria) Elisabeth Oetsch
1981	(Italy) Maddalena Silvestri	(France) Anne David	(Italy) Elena Matous
1983	(Czechoslovakia) Olga Charvatova	(Czechoslovakia) Jana Gantnerova-Soltysova	(Soviet Union) Marina Antonova-Yunusova
1985	not included in the program		
1987	(Czechoslovakia) Lenka Kebrlova	(Czechoslovakia) Ludmila Milanova	(Czechoslovakia) Monika Hojstricova
1989	(Czechoslovakia) Ludmila Milanova	(Soviet Union) Natalia Buga	(Germany) Constanze Prell
1991	(France) Małgorzata Tlałka-Mogore	(Czechoslovakia) Ludmila Milanova	(Japan) Waka Okazaki
1993	(United States) Shannon Nobis	(Italy) Sonia Colle	(Germany) Katrin Stotz
1995	(Sweden) Ulrika Nordberg	(France) Marie-Noëlle Ducet	(Japan) Junko Yamakawa
1997	(Slovenia) Andreja Potisk-Ribic	(Slovenia) Anja Kalan	(Japan) Junko Yamakawa
1999	(France) Eloise Bernard	(Sweden) Aasa Hammarberg	(Japan) Risa Kakisaka
2001	(Switzerland) Lea Nadig	(Japan) Juri Takishita	(Slovakia) Zuzana Smerciakova
2003	(Italy) Beatrice Boglio	(United Kingdom) Amanda Pirie	(Slovakia) Jana Staffenova
2005	(Czech Republic) Lucie Hrstkova	(Japan) Moe Hanaoka	(Italy) Beatrice Boglio
2007	(Italy) Camilla Alfieri	(Slovenia) Petra Robnik	(Slovenia) Urška Rabič (Italy) Alessia Pittin
2009	(Japan) Chika Kato	(Czech Republic) Lucie Hrstkova	(France) Pauline Socquet-Clerc
2011–2013	not included in the program		
2015	(Russia) Daria Ovchinnikova	(Czech Republic) Pavla Klicnarova	(Norway) Maren Nessen Byrkjeland
2017	(Russia) Anastasiia Silanteva	(Belarus) Maria Shkanova	(Slovakia) Barbara Kantorova
2019	(Austria) Jessica Gfrerer	(Switzerland) Amelie Dupasquier	(France) Carmen Haro
2023	(Spain) Celia Abad	(France) Julia Dagoreau	(Germany) Leonie Flötgen
2025	(France) Emy Charbonnier	(Sweden) Sophie Nyberg	(France) Louison Accambray

==== Combined classification ====
Year	Gold	Silver	Bronze
1990–2009	not included in the program		
2011	(United States) Erika Ghent	(Italy) Chiara Carratu	(Poland) Aleksandra Kluś
2013	(Slovakia) Jana Gantnerová	(Slovakia) Barbara Kantorova	(Belarus) Maria Shkanova
2015	(Norway) Maren Nessen Byrkjeland	(Andorra) Carmina Pallas	(Slovakia) Jana Gantnerová
2017–2019	not included in the program		

==== Super combined ====
Year	Gold	Silver	Bronze
1960–2009	not included in the program		
2011	(France) Aude Aguilaniu	(United States) Erika Ghent	(France) Charline Vion
2013–2025	not included in the program		

==== Carving ====
Year	Gold	Silver	Bronze
2003	(Italy) Alessandra Merlin	(Italy) Consuelo Pazutto	(Italy) Giorgia Rizzo

=== Woman's Para Alpine Skiing ===
==== VI ====
Year	Gold	Silver	Bronze
2025	(Italy) Martina Vozza	Only one competitor	Only one competitor

==== Standing ====
Year	Gold	Silver	Bronze
2025	(France) Aurélie Richard	(Spain) María Martín-Granizo	Only two competitors

==== Sitting ====
Year	Gold	Silver	Bronze
2025	(Spain) Audrey Pascual Seco	Only one competitor	Only one competitor

==== VI ====
Year	Gold	Silver	Bronze
2025	(Italy) Martina Vozza	(Germany) Luisa Gruber	(Croatia) Karla Kordic

==== Standing ====
Year	Gold	Silver	Bronze
2025	(France) Aurélie Richard	(Spain) María Martín-Granizo	(Austria) Laura Streng

==== Sitting ====
Year	Gold	Silver	Bronze
2025	(Finland) Nette Kiviranta	(Spain) Audrey Pascual Seco	Only two competitors

=== Mixed ===
==== Parallel team event ====
Year	Gold	Silver	Bronze
1960–2015	not included in the program		
2017	Czech Republic	Austria	Russia
2019	Austria	Russia	Sweden
2023	Sweden	Switzerland	Germany
2025	Sweden	Switzerland	France

== Medal table ==
Last updated after the 2025 Winter World University Games

Rank	Nation	Gold	Silver	Bronze	Total
1	Italy (ITA)	34	33	30	97
2	France (FRA)	33	32	33	98
3	Switzerland (SUI)	31	24	14	69
4	Czechoslovakia (TCH)	21	16	5	42
5	United States (USA)	18	21	19	58
6	Slovenia (SLO)	14	15	14	43
7	Russia (RUS)	14	8	14	36
8	Austria (AUT)	13	24	27	64
9	Poland (POL)	13	14	14	41
10	Czech Republic (CZE)	13	10	11	34
11	West Germany (FRG)	10	5	10	25
12	Sweden (SWE)	9	11	16	36
13	Spain (ESP)	9	4	5	18
14	Soviet Union (URS)	8	3	5	16
15	Japan (JPN)	7	10	13	30
16	Norway (NOR)	5	3	1	9
17	Yugoslavia (YUG)	4	7	7	18
18	Germany (GER)	4	7	5	16
19	Bulgaria (BUL)	3	5	2	10
20	Finland (FIN)	2	3	1	6
21	Slovakia (SVK)	1	7	9	17
22	Serbia and Montenegro (SCG)	1	2	1	4
23	Belarus (BLR)	1	1	2	4
24	Chile (CHI)	1	1	0	2
25	Canada (CAN)	1	0	1	2
26	Latvia (LAT)	1	0	0	1
26	Monaco (MON)	1	0	0	1
26	Serbia (SRB)	1	0	0	1
29	Andorra (AND)	0	2	1	3
30	Great Britain (GBR)	0	1	3	4
31	Lithuania (LTU)	0	1	0	1
31	Netherlands (NED)	0	1	0	1
33	Liechtenstein (LIE)	0	0	2	2
34	Croatia (CRO)	0	0	1	1
34	Romania (ROM)	0	0	1	1
Totals (35 entries)		273	271	267	811
