= Alpine skiing at the 2007 Winter Universiade =

Alpine skiing competition

Alpine skiing events at the 2007 Winter Universiade were held in Bardonecchia, Italy, from January 18 to 24, 2007. Downhill competitions were cancelled.

== Men's events ==
Event	Gold		Silver		Bronze	
Downhill	Cancelled					
Super-G	Petr Záhrobský; Czech Republic	1:11.36	Filip Trejbal; Czech Republic	1:11.53	Adam Cole; United States	1:11.65
Giant slalom	Aronne Pieruz; Italy	1:48.64	Filip Trejbal; Czech Republic	1:49.52	Adam Cole; United States	1:49.91
Slalom	Filip Trejbal; Czech Republic	1:25.94	Matic Skube; Slovenia	1:27.25	Petter Robertsson; Sweden	1:27.59
Combined	Filip Trejbal; Czech Republic	350 p.	Adam Cole; United States	302 p.	Tague Thorson; United States	300 p.

== Women's events ==
Event	Gold		Silver		Bronze	
Downhill	Cancelled					
Super-G	Giulia Gianesini; Italy	1:15.15	Alessia Pittin; Italy	1:16.30	Petra Robnik; Slovenia	1:16.52
Giant slalom	Camilla Alfieri; Italy	2:00.28	Ana Kobal; Slovenia	2:00.64	Sarah Schädler; Liechtenstein	2:00.91
Slalom	Katarzyna Karasińska; Poland	1:36.09	Aleksandra Kluś; Poland	1:36.34	Alenka Kuerner; Slovenia; Petra Robnik; Slovenia	1:36.61
Combined	Camilla Alfieri; Italy	324 p.	Petra Robnik; Slovenia	300 p.	Urška Rabič; Slovenia; Alessia Pittin; Italy	297 p.

== Medal table ==
Rank	Nation	Gold	Silver	Bronze	Total
1	Italy	4	1	1	6
2	Czech Republic	3	2	0	5
3	Poland	1	1	0	2
4	Slovenia	0	3	4	7
5	United States	0	1	3	4
6	Liechtenstein	0	0	1	1
6	Sweden	0	0	1	1
Totals (7 entries)		8	8	10	26

== Detailed results ==
=== Men's giant slalom ===
Pos.	Athlete	Run 1	Run 2	Total
1st place, gold medalist(s)	(Italy) Aronne Pieruz	50.39	58.25	1:48.64
2nd place, silver medalist(s)	(Czech Republic) Filip Trejbal	50.68	58.84	1:49.52
3rd place, bronze medalist(s)	(United States) Adam Cole	51.40	58.51	1:49.91
4.	(United States) Tague Thorson	51.20	59.13	1:50.33
5.	(Switzerland) Jan Urfer	51.54	59.10	1:50.64
6.	(United States) Charles Christianson	51.75	58.91	1:50.66
7.	(Italy) Francesco Ghedina	51.37	59.39	1:50.94
8.	(Italy) Luca Moretti	52.05	58.89	1:51.17
9.	(Canada) Cameron Barnes	51.66	59.51	1:51.37
10.	(Czech Republic) Martin Vráblík	52.77	58.60	1:51.48

== Sources ==
- Full alpine skiing results
