= 2005 Alpine Skiing World Cup – Women's slalom =

2005 Women's slalom World Cup
Previous: 2004	Next: 2006

Women's slalom World Cup 2004/2005

== Final point standings ==
In women's slalom World Cup 2004/05 all results count.

Place	Name	Country	Total points	3 (United States)	4 (United States)	9 (Austria)	13 (Austria)	17 (Italy)	22 (Croatia)	24 (Slovenia)	32 (Switzerland)
1	Tanja Poutiainen	Finland	570	60	100	100	60	40	100	60	50
2	Janica Kostelić	Croatia	400	100	-	60	80	-	-	80	80
3	Marlies Schild	Austria	376	-	-	80	100	100	60	36	-
4	Kristina Koznick	United States	355	40	60	26	24	80	80	45	-
5	Sarah Schleper	United States	337	24	16	36	45	26	40	50	100
6	Anja Pärson	Sweden	301	80	-	50	45	-	-	100	26
7	Nicole Hosp	Austria	204	50	-	-	15	29	50	-	60
8	Monika Bergmann-Schmuderer	Germany	194	36	-	32	50	60	-	16	-
9	Veronika Zuzulová	Slovakia	185	22	32	11	26	50	24	20	-
10	Nika Fleiss	Croatia	183	7	29	29	13	15	32	18	40
11	Šárka Záhrobská	Czech Republic	158	9	24	18	29	32	14	32	-
12	Martina Ertl	Germany	152	11	20	5	36	10	20	-	50
13	Laure Pequegnot	France	144	-	40	13	22	20	-	29	20
14	Sonja Nef	Switzerland	140	-	15	12	20	22	45	26	-
15	Christel Pascal	France	137	45	-	24	6	26	7	7	22
	Sabine Egger	Austria	137	10	26	40	14	-	9	22	16
17	Manuela Mölgg	Italy	135	20	80	8	-	3	18	6	-
18	Florine de Leymarie	France	130	12	50	9	8	6	16	11	18
19	Resi Stiegler	United States	124	15	-	22	32	14	26	15	-
20	Ana Jelušić	Croatia	121	13	45	-	12	9	29	13	-
21	Annemarie Gerg	Germany	108	36	-	20	7	45	-	-	-
22	Elisabeth Görgl	Austria	99	18	-	45	-	36	-	-	-
23	Kathrin Zettel	Austria	95	4	-	-	10	12	-	40	29
24	Henna Raita	Finland	92	8	11	14	10	11	5	9	24
25	Therese Borssén	Sweden	88	-	36	-	-	16	36	-	-
26	Julia Mancuso	United States	83	26	-	-	-	-	11	14	32
27	Nicole Gius	Italy	61	36	-	-	-	8	15	2	-
28	Lindsey Kildow	United States	60	-	-	-	-	-	-	24	36
29	Line Viken	Norway	58	16	18	10	-	14	-	-	-
30	Anna Ottosson	Sweden	39	-	10	4	-	-	22	3	-
31	Michaela Kirchgasser	Austria	33	-	-	15	18	-	-	-	-
32	Karin Truppe	Austria	32	-	-	7	-	20	-	5	-
33	Maria Pietilä-Holmner	Sweden	28	14	-	-	-	-	6	8	-
34	Marlies Oester	Switzerland	26	-	9	-	5	-	12	-	-
35	Vanessa Vidal	France	25	-	22	-	-	-	3	-	-
36	Annalisa Ceresa	Italy	24	-	-	16	-	-	8	-	-
37	Lisa Bremseth	Norway	20	-	14	6	-	-	-	-	-
38	Britt Janyk	Canada	19	-	12	-	-	7	-	-	-
39	Tina Maze	Slovenia	17	-	-	-	-	5	-	12	-
40	Chiara Costazza	Italy	16	-	-	-	16	-	-	-	-
41	Katarzyna Karasińska	Poland	14	-	-	-	-	4	10	-	-
42	Petra Zakouřilová	Czech Republic	13	-	13	-	-	-	-	-	-
	Brigitte Acton	Canada	13	-	-	-	-	-	13	-	-
44	Maria Riesch	Germany	12	-	-	-	12	-	-	-	-
45	Lauren Ross	United States	10	-	8	-	-	-	2	-	-
	Christine Sponring	Austria	10	-	-	-	-	-	-	10	-
47	Karen Putzer	Italy	7	-	7	-	-	-	-	-	-
48	Karina Birkelund	Norway	6	6	-	-	-	-	-	-	-
49	Sofie Olofsson	Sweden	5	5	-	-	-	-	-	-	-
50	Daniela Zeiser	Austria	4	-	-	-	4	-	-	-	-
	Noriyo Hiroi	Japan	4	-	-	-	-	-	4	-	-
	Janette Hargin	Sweden	4	-	-	-	-	-	-	4	-

- Note: In the last race only the best racers were allowed to compete and only the best 15 finishers were awarded with points.
