= Alpine skiing at the 1997 Winter Universiade =

Alpine skiing at the 1997 Winter Universiade was held at the Muju Resort in Muju, South Korea from January 26 to February 2, 1997.

== Men's events ==
Event	Gold		Silver		Bronze	
Downhill	Luca Vidi; Switzerland	1:20.57	Miran Ravter; Slovenia	1:20.94	David de Costa; Slovenia	1:21.70
Super-G	Miran Ravter; Slovenia	1:19.11	Luca Vidi; Switzerland	1:19.26	Roman Valyaev; Russia	1:20.26
Giant slalom	Uroš Pavlovčič; Slovenia	2:13.70	Stefan Lanziner; Austria	2:14.55	Miran Ravter; Slovenia	2:14.64
Slalom	Emil Englund; Sweden	1:34.81	Michel Bortis; Switzerland	1:35.38	Uroš Pavlovčič; Slovenia	1:35.54
Combined	Miran Ravter; Slovenia		Magnus Oja; Sweden		Stefan Lanziner; Austria	

== Women's events ==
Event	Gold		Silver		Bronze	
Downhill	Andreja Potisk-Ribič; Slovenia	1:10.91	Anja Kalan; Slovenia	1:11.03	Katherine Davenport; United States	1:11.78
Super-G	Anja Kalan; Slovenia	1:22.42	Andreja Potisk-Ribič; Slovenia	1:22.71	Jessica Ochs; United States	1:23.09
Giant slalom	Andreja Potisk-Ribič; Slovenia	2:18.38	Junko Yamakawa; Japan	2:18.80	Roberta Pergher; Italy	2:20.79
Slalom	Junko Yamakawa; Japan	1:37.10	Roberta Pergher; Italy	1:38.49	Anna Beischer; Sweden	1:38.81
Combined	Andreja Potisk-Ribič; Slovenia		Anja Kalan; Slovenia		Junko Yamakawa; Japan	

== Medal table ==
Rank	Nation	Gold	Silver	Bronze	Total
1	Slovenia	7	4	3	14
2	Switzerland	1	2	0	3
3	Japan	1	1	1	3
3	Sweden	1	1	1	3
5	Austria	0	1	1	2
5	Italy	0	1	1	2
7	United States	0	0	2	2
8	Russia	0	0	1	1
Totals (8 entries)		10	10	10	30

== Links ==
- The Winter Universiade ’97, Muju-Chonju Official Report (’97 무주·전주 동계유니버시아드대회 공식보고서) (in Korean). The Organizing Committee for the Winter Universiade ’97, Muju-Chonju. 25 September 1997.
