= Clusen =

Clusen is a German patronymic or topographic surname, an orthographic variant of Klusen, named either after the name Klus or after a dwelling type from Middle High German klūse , klūs , kliuse , klōse , Middle Low German klūse 'hermitage, secluded house, monastery, dwelling, crevice, cleft, bottleneck, sluice' Notable people with the name include:

- Gerald W. Clusen
- Ruth Clusen

== See also ==
- Clausen
