= Alpine skiing at the 2017 Winter Universiade =

Alpine skiing at the XXVIII Winter Universiade
- Venue: Shymbulak Ski Resort
- Dates: 30 January – 7 February 2017

Alpine skiing at the 2017 Winter Universiade was held at the Shymbulak near Almaty, the largest city of Kazakhstan from January 29 to February 7, 2017.

== Men's events ==
Event	Gold		Silver		Bronze	
Super-G	(Italy) Michelangelo Tentori	1:03.03	(Russia) Evgenij Pyasik	1:03.06	(Russia) Simon Efimov	1:03.77
Giant slalom	(Italy) Giulio Giovanni Bosca	2:12.77	(Switzerland) Joel Müller	2:12.99	(Switzerland) Cédric Noger	2:13.39
Slalom	(Austria) Richard Leitgeb	1:55.16	(Austria) Bernhard Binderitsch	1:56.44	(Austria) Tobias Kogler	1:56.57
Combined	(Latvia) Kristaps Zvejnieks	2:02.20	(Netherlands) Maarten Meiners	2:03.08	(Slovakia) Matej Falat	2:03.21

== Women's events ==
Event	Gold		Silver		Bronze	
Super-G	(Russia) Elena Yakovishina	1:06.25	(Finland) Nea Luukko	1:06.98	(Japan) Asa Ando	1:07.17
Giant slalom	(Japan) Asa Ando	2:25.68	(Slovenia) Desiree Ajlec	2:26.81	(Belarus) Maria Shkanova	2:27.28
Slalom	(Belarus) Maria Shkanova	1:32.57	(Germany) Monica Hübner	1:32.67	(Sweden) Louise Jansson	1:32.80
Combined	(Russia) Anastasiia Silanteva	2:08.24	(Belarus) Maria Shkanova	2:10.02	(Slovakia) Barbara Kantorová	2:10.35

== Mixed Event ==
Event	Gold	Silver	Bronze
Parallel Team Event	Czech Republic; Adam Zika; Daniel Paulus; Martina Dubovská; Tereza Kmochová	Austria; Richard Leitgeb; Tobias Kogler; Denise Widner; Rebecca Fiegl	Russia; Aleksander Andrienko; Evgenij Pyasik; Anastasiia Silanteva; Iulija Pleshkova
