= Sergey Komarov =

Sergey Komarov may refer to:

- Sergey Komarov (skier)
- Sergey Komarov (actor)
