= Camilla Alfieri =

Italian alpine skier (born 1985)

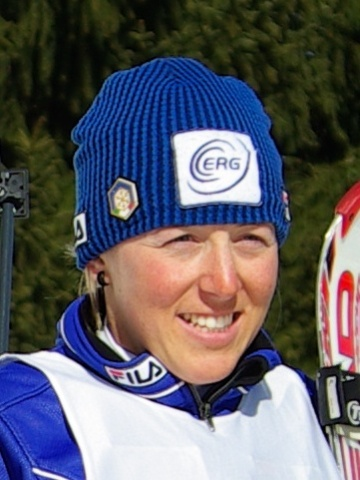

Camilla Alfieri (born 1985) is a retired Italian alpine skier.

== Career ==
She competed at the 2003, 2004 and 2005 Junior World Championships, a 6th place in 2004 her best placement. She also won the gold medal in giant slalom at the 2007 Winter Universiade.

She made her FIS Alpine Ski World Cup debut in January 2004 in Megeve. She collected her first World Cup points in December 2005, finishing 29th in the Špindlerův Mlýn giant slalom. She experienced a minor breakthrough around New Years' 2008, finishing 10th in Lienz and 13th in Špindlerův Mlýn, both giant slalom events, and again managed a 10th place in October 2009 in Sölden. Her last World Cup outing came in the same race two years later, but here she was disqualified.

She represented the military sports club CS Esercito.
