= World Junior Alpine Skiing Championships 2003 =

International skiing competition

The World Junior Alpine Skiing Championships 2003 were the 22nd World Junior Alpine Skiing Championships, held between 4–8 March 2003 in Briançonnais, France.

== Medal winners ==
=== Men's events ===
Event	Gold		Silver		Bronze	
Downhill	Daniel Albrecht; Switzerland	1:09.49	Sergey Komarov; Russia	1:09.79	Marc Berthod; Switzerland	1:09.85
Super-G	François Bourque; Canada	1:17.10	Sergey Komarov; Russia	1:17.29	Mario Scheiber; Austria	1:17.31
Giant Slalom	Daniel Albrecht; Switzerland; Mario Scheiber; Austria	2:02.72	Not awarded		Philipp Schörghofer; Austria	2:02.74
Slalom	Marc Berthod; Switzerland	1:33.74	Daniel Albrecht; Switzerland	1:34.07	Lucas Senoner; Italy	1:34.13
Combined	Daniel Albrecht; Switzerland	2.01 points	Lucas Senoner; Italy	44.47	Christian Flaschberger; Austria	68.30

- Two gold medals were awarded in the Giant Slalom.

=== Women's events ===
Event	Gold		Silver		Bronze	
Downhill	Tamara Wolf; Switzerland	1:12.23	Lindsey Kildow; United States	1:12.45	Julia Mancuso; United States	1:12.85
Super-G	Julia Mancuso; United States	1:20.02	Brigitte Acton; Canada	1:20.78	Kelly VanderBeek; Canada	1:20.87
Giant Slalom	Jessica Lindell-Vikarby; Sweden	2:05.70	Lene Løseth; Norway	2:06.41	Maria Riesch; Germany	2:06.84
Slalom	Michaela Kirchgasser; Austria	1:38.53	Ana Jelušić; Croatia	1:38.82	Resi Stiegler; United States	1:39.37
Combined	Maria Riesch; Germany	25.68 points	Michaela Kirchgasser; Austria	39.03	Resi Stiegler; United States	41.61
