= Klus =

Klus is a given name and a surname of multiple origins.

- A German given name, an orthographic variant of Klaus, short form of Nikolaus
- A German patronymic or topographic surname named either after the given name or a type of dwelling place, type from Middle High German klūse , klūs , kliuse , klōse , Middle Low German klūse 'hermitage, secluded house, monastery, dwelling, crevice, cleft, bottleneck, sluice', or a populated place named Klus or Kluse.
  - In Czech language, the feminine form of the surname Klus is Klusová.
- Polish surname (feminine: Klusowa by husband, Klusówna by father), either borrowed of German or from the nickname from the word klus (a lump of clay, suitable for pottery)
- Polish surnames without diacritics:
  - Kluś (feminine: Klusiowa by husband, Klusiówna by father)
  - Kłus (feminine: Kłusowa by husband, Kłusówna by father)
  - Kłuś (feminine: Kłusiowa by husband, Kłusiówna by father)

Notable people with the name include:

- Aleksandra Kluś, Polish Alpine skier
- Dariusz Kłus, Polish football player and manager
- Martin Klus, Slovak academic, commentator, politician and political theorist
- Tomáš Klus, Czech musician and songwriter
- Zuzana Klusová (born 1985), Czech politician and social activist

== Fictional characters ==
- Jean-Bernard Klus, fictional philosopher, a creation of Australian scholar and writer David Solomon

== See also ==
- Klusen
- Kluss
- Klusak
- Klusek
