= Kobal =

Kobal is a surname with multiple etymologies. It may refer to:

- Ana Kobal (born 1983), Slovene alpine skier
- John Kobal (1940–1991), British film critic
- Sebastjan Kobal (born 1976), Slovene rally driver
- Sinem Kobal (born 1987), Turkish television and film actress
