= Maarten Meiners =

Dutch alpine skier (born 1992)

Personal information
- Born: 8 February 1992 (age 34) Amersfoort
- Website: http://www.maartenmeinersofficial.com/

Skiing career
- Sport: Alpine skiing
- World Cup debut: 16 December 2012 (age 20)

World Championships
- Teams: 5 – (2011–19)

World Cup
- Seasons: 5 – (2013–15, 2018–19)
Medal record
Men's alpine skiing
Representing Netherlands
Winter Universiade
Silver medal – second place	2017 Almaty	Combined

Maarten Meiners (born 8 February 1992) is a Dutch alpine ski racer.

He competed at the 2015 World Championships in Beaver Creek, USA, in the giant slalom.

== World Cup results ==
=== Results per discipline ===
Discipline	WC starts	WC Top 30	WC Top 15	WC Top 5	WC Podium	Best result		
Discipline	WC starts	WC Top 30	WC Top 15	WC Top 5	WC Podium	Date	Location	Place
Slalom	1	0	0	0	0	12 January 2014	Adelboden, Switzerland	DNS
Giant slalom	33	1	0	0	0	7 December 2020	Santa Caterina, Italy	26th
Super-G	3	0	0	0	0	20 December 2013	Val Gardena, Italy	DNF
Downhill	0	0	0	0	0			
Combined	1	0	0	0	0	22 February 2019	Bansko, Bulgaria	35th
Parallel	1	0	0	0	0	27 November 2020	Zürs, Austria	43rd
Total	39	1	0	0	0			

- Standings through 21 March 2021

== World Championship results ==
Year
Year	Age	Slalom	Giant; Slalom	Super G	Downhill	Combined	Parallel
2011	19	52	59	—	—	—	—N/a
2013	21	DNF2	37	DNF	—	20	—N/a
2015	23	DNF1	DNF2	—	—	—	—N/a
2017	25	—	DNF2	—	—	—	—N/a
2019	27	—	28	31	—	—	—N/a
2021	29	—	DNF1	—	—	—	DNQF

== Winter Universiade results ==
Year
Year	Age	Slalom	Giant; Slalom	Super G	Downhill	Combined
2017	24	—	DNF1	—	—N/a	2

== Other results ==
=== European Cup results ===
==== Season standings ====
Season	Age	Overall	Slalom	Giant slalom	Super-G	Downhill	Combined
2014	22	120	—	38	—	—	—
2015	23	101	—	30	—	—	—
2016	24	173	—	62	—	—	—
2017	25	didn't score european cup point					
2018	26	190	—	—	53	—	—
2019	27	118	—	43	39	—	—

==== Results per discipline ====
Discipline	EC starts	EC Top 30	EC Top 15	EC Top 5	EC Podium	Best result		
Discipline	EC starts	EC Top 30	EC Top 15	EC Top 5	EC Podium	Date	Location	Place
Slalom	6	0	0	0	0	3 times		DNQ2
Giant slalom	54	13	3	0	0	10 February 2014; 27 January 2015	Oberjoch, Germany; Lélex, France	10th
Super-G	15	3	0	0	0	21 December 2018	Zauchensee, Austria	19th
Downhill	3	0	0	0	0	20 March 2015	Soldeu, Andorra	51st
Combined	2	0	0	0	0	21 February 2018	Sarntal, Italy	32nd
Total	80	16	3	0	0			

- Standings through 15 February 2019

=== Far East Cup results ===
==== Season standings ====
Season	Age	Overall	Slalom	Giant slalom	Super-G	Downhill	Combined
2017	25	28	43	19	22	—	—

==== Results per discipline ====
Discipline	FEC starts	FEC Top 30	FEC Top 15	FEC Top 5	FEC Podium	Best result		
Discipline	FEC starts	FEC Top 30	FEC Top 15	FEC Top 5	FEC Podium	Date	Location	Place
Slalom	5	3	2	0	0	5 March 2017	Sapporo, Japan	13th
Giant slalom	4	3	3	0	0	4 March 2017; 8 March 2017	Sapporo, Japan; Engaru, Japan	7th
Super-G	2	2	2	0	0	18 March 2017	Yuzhno-Sakhalinsk, Russia	10th
Downhill	0	0	0	0	0			
Combined	0	0	0	0	0			
Total	11	8	7	0	0			

- Standings through 13 December 2018

=== South American Cup results ===
==== Season standings ====
Season	Age	Overall	Slalom	Giant slalom	Super-G	Downhill	Combined
2014	21	114	—	49	—	—	—

==== Results per discipline ====
Discipline	SAC starts	SAC Top 30	SAC Top 15	SAC Top 5	SAC Podium	Best result		
Discipline	SAC starts	SAC Top 30	SAC Top 15	SAC Top 5	SAC Podium	Date	Location	Place
Slalom	1	0	0	0	0	14 September 2013	Cerro Castor, Argentina	DNF
Giant slalom	2	1	0	0	0	13 September 2013	Cerro Castor, Argentina	16th
Super-G	0	0	0	0	0			
Downhill	0	0	0	0	0			
Combined	0	0	0	0	0			
Total	3	1	0	0	0			

- Standings through 12 September 2018
