= Ivan Kuznetsov (skier) =

Russian alpine skier (born 1996)

Personal information
- Nationality: Russian
- Born: 8 June 1996 (age 30) Petropavlovsk-Kamchatsky, Russia

Sport
- Sport: Alpine skiing
Medal record
Representing Russia
Winter Universiade
Gold medal – first place	2019 Krasnoyarsk	Giant slalom

Ivan Kuznetsov (Russian: Иван Кузнецов; born 8 June 1996) is a Russian alpine skier. He competed in the 2018 Winter Olympics.

== World Championship results ==
Year	Age	Slalom	Giant slalom	Super-G	Downhill	Combined	Team	Parallel
2021	24	—	—	—	—	—	—	13
