= Maria Shkanova =

Belarusian alpine skier (born 1989)

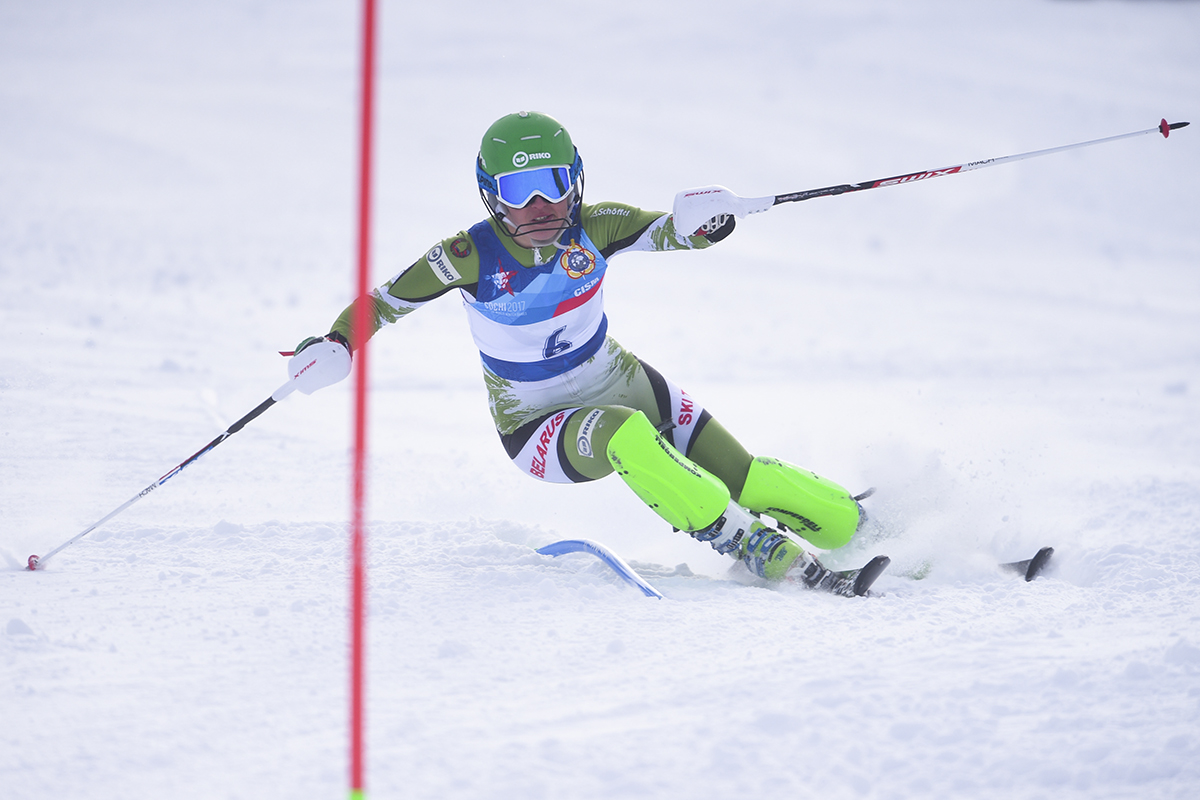
- Shkanova in 2017

Personal information
- Born: 18 October 1989 (age 37) Leningrad (Saint Petersburg), Russian SFSR, Soviet Union

Skiing career
- Country: Belarus
- Sport: Alpine skiing ♀
- Club: Belarus Alpine Ski Federation
- Disciplines: Slalom, giant slalom, combined
- World Cup debut: 3 January 2012 (age 22)

Olympics
- Teams: 5 – (2010–2026)
- Medals: 0

World Championships
- Teams: 6 – (2009–2013, 2017–2021)
- Medals: 0

World Cup
- Seasons: 12 – (2012–2022, 2026)
- Overall titles: 0 – (112th in 2022)
- Discipline titles: 0 – (48th in SL, 2022)
Medal record
Alpine skiing
Representing Belarus
Winter Universiade
Silver medal – second place	2017 Almaty	Combined
Silver medal – second place	2017 Almaty	Slalom
Bronze medal – third place	2013 Trentino	Combined
Bronze medal – third place	2017 Almaty	Giant slalom
World Military Games
Silver medal – second place	2017 Sochi	Slalom

Maria Igorevna Shkanova (Russian: Мария Игоревна Шканова, Belarusian: Марыя Ігараўна Шканава Maryja Iharaŭna Škanava; born 18 October 1989) is a World Cup alpine ski racer from Belarus. She competed for Belarus at the 2010, 2014, 2018, and 2022 Winter Olympics, and appeared at the 2026 Olympics as an Individual Neutral Athlete. Her best result was a 20th place in the 2022 slalom. She won a bronze medal in the combined event at the 2013 Winter Universiade.

== World Cup results ==
=== Season standings ===
Season
Season	Age	Overall	Slalom	Giant slalom	Super-G	Downhill	Combined	Parallel
2017	27	113	51	—	—	—	—	—N/a
2018	28	no World Cup points earned						
2019	29	no World Cup points earned						
2020	30	no World Cup points earned						
2021	31	no World Cup points earned						
2022	32	112	48	—	—	—	—N/a	—

== World Championships results ==
Year
Year	Age	Slalom	Giant slalom	Super-G	Downhill	Combined	Parallel	Team event
2009	19	DNF1	DNF1	31	—	—	—N/a	—N/a
2011	21	DNF1	47	29	—	—	—N/a	—
2013	23	DNF2	DNF1	DNS1	—	30	—N/a	—
2017	27	31	DNF2	—	—	—	—N/a	—
2019	29	25	48	—	—	—	—N/a	—
2021	31	28	DNF1	—	—	—	DNQ	—

== Olympic results ==
Year
Year	Age	Slalom	Giant slalom	Super-G	Downhill	Combined	Team combined
2010	20	38	40	33	—	—	—N/a
2014	24	29	44	DNF1	—	—	—N/a
2018	28	28	38	DNS	—	—	—N/a
2022	32	20	—	—	—	—	—N/a
2026	36	37	—	—	—	—N/a	—
