= Alpine skiing at the 2013 Winter Universiade =

Alpine skiing at the 2013 Winter Universiade was held at the Nouva Cima Uomo in Passo San Pellegrino - Moena and Alloch Piste in Pozza di Fassa from December 13 to December 20, 2013.

== Men's events ==
Event	Gold		Silver		Bronze	
Downhill	Davide Cazzaniga; Italy	1:13.00	Blaise Giezendanner; France	1:13.48	Guglielmo Bosca; Italy	1:13.73
Super-G	Blaise Giezendanner; France	1:22.32	Nicolas Raffort; France	1:22.87	Guglielmo Bosca; Italy	1:23.12
Giant slalom	Jonas Fabre; France	1:47.74	Thibaut Favrot; France	1:48.02	Not awarded	
Giant slalom	Jonas Fabre; France	1:47.74	Giulio Bosca; Italy	1:48.02	Not awarded	
Slalom	Joonas Räsänen; Finland	1:32.09	Adam Žampa; Slovakia	1:32.25	Kryštof Krýzl; Czech Republic	1:32.72
Combined	Olivier Jenot; Monaco	328	Blaise Giezendanner; France	323	Ondrej Berndt; Czech Republic	317

== Women's events ==
Event	Gold		Silver		Bronze	
Downhill	Valentina Golenkova; Russia	1:17.92	Jana Gantnerová; Slovakia	1:18.04	Karolina Chrapek; Poland	1:18.21
Super-G	Giulia Borgetti; Italy	1:28.43	Karolina Chrapek; Poland	1:28.58	Valentina Golenkova; Russia	1:29.22
Giant slalom	Maryna Gąsienica-Daniel; Poland	1:50.99	Michelle Morik; Austria	1:51.23	Veronica Smedh; Sweden	1:51.54
Slalom	Nevena Ignjatović; Serbia	1:38.42	Margaux Givel; Switzerland	1:38.78	Martina Dubovská; Czech Republic	1:38.98
Combined	Jana Gantnerová; Slovakia	398	Barbara Kantorová; Slovakia	381	Maria Shkanova; Belarus	355

== Medal table ==
Rank	Nation	Gold	Silver	Bronze	Total
1	France	2	4	0	6
2	Italy	2	1	2	5
3	Slovakia	1	3	0	4
4	Poland	1	1	1	3
5	Russia	1	0	1	2
6	Finland	1	0	0	1
6	Monaco	1	0	0	1
6	Serbia	1	0	0	1
9	Austria	0	1	0	1
9	Switzerland	0	1	0	1
11	Czech Republic	0	0	3	3
12	Belarus	0	0	1	1
12	Sweden	0	0	1	1
Totals (13 entries)		10	11	9	30
