= Katarzyna Karasińska =

Polish alpine skier (born 1982)

Personal information
- Born: 24 October 1982 (age 43) Wrocław, Poland
Medal record
Women's alpine skiing
Representing Poland
Winter Universiade
Gold medal – first place	2007 Turin	Slalom
Gold medal – first place	2009 Harbin	Slalom
Bronze medal – third place	2009 Harbin	Giant slalom

Katarzyna Karasińska (born 24 October 1982) is a Polish world class alpine skier. She achieved 5th place in the International Ski Federation's 2005 European Cup slalom event. She also competed in the 2006 Winter Olympics, ranking #30 in women's slalom, and in the 2005 Alpine Skiing World Cup, ranking #41 in women's slalom.
