= Klusáček =

Klusáček is a Czech patronymic surname derived from the nickname Klusák.

- Jana Klusáčková (born 1977), Czech freestyle swimmer
- Karel Ludvík Klusáček (1865–1929), Czech painter, illustrator and poet
- Christian Franz Klusáček, birth name of Chris Roberts (1944–2017), German schlager singer and actor
- Luděk Klusáček (born 1967), Czech football player and coach
- Michal Klusáček (born 1979), Czech politician
