= Samu Torsti =

Finnish alpine skier (born 1991)

Personal information
- Born: 5 September 1991 (age 34) Vaasa, Finland

Skiing career
- Sport: Alpine skiing
- Club: Vasa Skidklubb
- Disciplines: Giant slalom
World Cup debut
20 December 2009 (age 18)

Olympics
- Teams: 2 (2014, 2018)
- Medals: 0

World Championships
- Teams: 4 – (2011, 13, 15, 17)
- Medals: 0

World Cup
- Seasons: 9th – (2010–18)
- Wins: 0
- Podiums: 0
- Overall titles: 0 – (96th in 2015)
- Discipline titles: 0 – (26th in GS, 2015)

Samu Torsti (born 5 September 1991 in Vaasa, Finland) is an alpine skier from Finland.

== World Cup results ==
=== Season standings ===
Season	Age	Overall	Slalom	Giant Slalom	Super G	Downhill	Combined
2010	18	—	—	—	—	—	—
2011	19	—	—	—	—	—	—
2012	20	—	—	—	—	—	—
2013	21	—	—	—	—	—	—
2014	22	—	—	—	—	—	—
2015	23	96	—	26	—	—	—
2016	24	149	—	53	—	—	—
2017	25	112	—	40	—	—	—
2018	26	105	—	38	—	—	—

- Standings through 3 Mar 2018.

== World Championship results ==
Year	Age	Slalom	Giant slalom	Super-G	Downhill	Combined	Team	Parallel
2021	29	—	15	—	—	—	—	12
