= Klusen =

Klusen is a Germanic patronymic or topographic surname, named either after the name Klus or after a dwelling type from Middle High German klūse , klūs , kliuse , klōse , Middle Low German klūse 'hermitage, secluded house, monastery, dwelling, crevice, cleft, bottleneck, sluice'

- Ernst Klusen
- Peter Klusen

== See also ==
- Clusen
