= Klusak =

Klusak is either a Czech surname Klusák, feminine: Klusáková or a Polish surname Kłusak, archaic feminine forms: Kłusakowa (after husband), Kłusakówna (after father).. Both derived as nickname from the term "trot", i.e., "Trotter". The Czech feminine form is Klusáková. Notable people with the surname include:

- Jan Klusák, Czech composer
- Michał Kłusak, Polish alpine skier
- Milan Klusák ((1923–1992)), Czechoslovak diplomat, university lecturer and Minister of Culture of the Czech Socialist Republic
- Pavel Klusák (born 1969), Czech music critic and author
- Vít Klusák (born 1980), Czech film director
- Vladimír Klusák Czech ethnographer, musicologist, and composer
- Zoe Klusáková-Svobodová, Czech economist, academic, writer and translator

== See also ==
- Klus
- Klusáček
- Klosak
