= World Junior Alpine Skiing Championships 2005 =

International competitions in Alpine skiing

The World Junior Alpine Skiing Championships 2005 were the 24th World Junior Alpine Skiing Championships, held between 23–27 February 2005 in Bardonecchia, Italy.

== Medal winners ==
=== Men's events ===
Event	Gold		Silver		Bronze	
Downhill	Rok Perko; Slovenia	1:25.58	Christopher Beckmann; United States	1:25.78	Erik Fisher; United States	1:26.40
Super-G	Michael Gmeiner; Austria	1:25.20	Rok Perko; Slovenia; Gareth Sine; Canada	1:25.25	Not awarded	
Giant Slalom	Michael Gmeiner; Austria	2:10.28	Florian Scheiber; Austria	2:10.55	Stefan Guay; Canada	2:10.85
Slalom	Filip Trejbal; Czech Republic	1:24.10	Mattias Hargin; Sweden	1:24.74	Beat Feuz; Switzerland	1:25.02
Combined	Tim Jitloff; United States	37.53 points	Kjetil Jansrud; Norway	39.20	Florian Scheiber; Austria	42.84

- Two silver medals were awarded in the Super-G.

=== Women's events ===
Event	Gold		Silver		Bronze	
Downhill	Nadia Fanchini; Italy	1:28.84	Elena Fanchini; Italy	1:28.95	Katrin Triendl; Austria	1:29.61
Super-G	Andrea Fischbacher; Austria	1:26.81	Nadia Fanchini; Italy	1:26.90	Elena Fanchini; Italy	1:27.06
Giant Slalom	Nadia Fanchini; Italy	2:21.34	Brigitte Acton; Canada	2:21.64	Michaela Kirchgasser; Austria	2:21.73
Slalom	Šárka Záhrobská; Czech Republic	1:23.97	Kathrin Zettel; Austria	1:24.33	Ana Jelušić; Croatia	1:25.19
Combined	Kathrin Zettel; Austria	35.54 points	Resi Stiegler; United States	57.86	Sophie Splawinski; Canada	74.29
