= FIS Alpine World Ski Championships 2021 – Men's parallel giant slalom =

Men's parallel giant slalom at the FIS Alpine World Ski Championships 2021
- Location: Cortina d'Ampezzo, Italy
- Date: 16 February
- Competitors: 48 from 20 nations

Medalists
gold medal	Mathieu Faivre	France
silver medal	Filip Zubčić	Croatia
bronze medal	Loïc Meillard	Switzerland

Men's Parallel Giant Slalom
- Location: Lino Lacedelli; Cortina d'Ampezzo, Italy
- Vertical: 165 m (541 ft)
- Top elevation: 2,055 m (6,742 ft)
- Base elevation: 1,890 m (6,201 ft)

The Men's parallel giant slalom competition at the FIS Alpine World Ski Championships 2021 was held on 16 February 2021.

== Qualification ==
The qualification was started at 10:00.

Rank	Bib	Name	Country	Red course	Blue course	Notes
1	3	Loïc Meillard	Switzerland	31.79 (1)		Q
2	1	Alexander Schmid	Germany	32.01 (2)		Q
3	14	Fabio Gstrein	Austria		32.02 (1)	Q
4	11	Žan Kranjec	Slovenia	32.03 (3)		Q
5	2	Stefan Luitz	Germany		32.14 (2)	Q
6	26	Marco Odermatt	Switzerland		32.31 (3)	Q
7	41	Samu Torsti	Finland	32.38 (4)		Q
8	20	Linus Straßer	Germany		32.41 (4)	Q
9	10	Mathieu Faivre	France		32.51 (5)	Q
10	15	Timon Haugan	Norway	32.53 (5)		Q
11	19	Luca de Aliprandini	Italy	32.63 (6)		Q
12	22	River Radamus	United States		32.64 (6)	Q
13	7	Filip Zubčić	Croatia	32.64 (7)		Q
14	13	Mattias Rönngren	Sweden	32.68 (8)		Q
15	17	Justin Murisier	Switzerland	32.69 (9)		
16	16	Štefan Hadalin	Slovenia		32.81 (7)	Q
17	25	Marco Schwarz	Austria	32.86 (10)		
18	37	Luke Winters	United States	32.90 (11)		
19	30	Ivan Kuznetsov	Russian Ski Federation		32.97 (8)	Q
20	6	Roland Leitinger	Austria		33.00 (9)	
21	29	Istok Rodeš	Croatia	33.08 (12)		
22	21	Giovanni Borsotti	Italy	33.13 (13)		
23	27	Riccardo Tonetti	Italy	33.14 (14)		
24	24	Trevor Philp	Canada		33.25 (10)	
25	39	Laurie Taylor	Great Britain	33.34 (15)		
26	40	Andreas Žampa	Slovakia		33.41 (11)	
27	33	William Hansson	Sweden	33.53 (16)		
28	43	Aljaž Dvornik	Slovenia	33.56 (17)		
29	31	Maarten Meiners	Netherlands	33.78 (18)		
30	47	Willis Feasey	New Zealand	33.87 (19)		
31	46	Dries Van den Broecke	Belgium		33.87 (12)	
32	48	Charlie Raposo	Great Britain		34.32 (13)	
33	45	Yohei Koyama	Japan	34.76 (20)		
–	4	Adrian Pertl	Austria		DNF	
–	5	Thibaut Favrot	France	DNF		
–	8	Leif Kristian Nestvold-Haugen	Norway		DNF	
–	9	Gino Caviezel	Switzerland	DNF		
–	12	Erik Read	Canada		DNF	
–	18	Kristoffer Jakobsen	Sweden		DNF	
–	23	Fabian Wilkens Solheim	Norway	DNF		
–	28	Sebastian Holzmann	Germany		DNF	
–	32	Jeffrey Read	Canada		DNF	
–	34	Ondřej Berndt	Czech Republic		DNF	
–	35	Jan Zabystřan	Czech Republic	DNF		
–	36	Seigo Kato	Japan		DNF	
–	38	Billy Major	Great Britain		DNF	
–	42	Kryštof Krýzl	Czech Republic		DNF	
–	44	Giovanni Franzoni	Italy		DNF	

== Elimination round ==
1/8 finals
1	(Switzerland) Loïc Meillard
16	(Russia) Ivan Kuznetsov	+2.23
8	(Germany) Linus Straßer
9	(Norway) Timon Haugan	DNS
5	(Slovenia) Žan Kranjec	+0.09
12	(United States) River Radamus
4	(Germany) Stefan Luitz	+0.20
13	(Croatia) Filip Zubčić
3	(Germany) Alexander Schmid
14	(Slovenia) Štefan Hadalin	+0.08
6	(Switzerland) Marco Odermatt	+0.01
11	(Italy) Luca de Aliprandini
7	(Finland) Samu Torsti	+0.55
10	(France) Mathieu Faivre
2	(Austria) Fabio Gstrein
15	(Sweden) Mattias Rönngren	DNF

Quarterfinals
1	(Switzerland) Loïc Meillard
8	(Germany) Linus Straßer	+0.24
12	(United States) River Radamus	+0.62
13	(Croatia) Filip Zubčić
3	(Germany) Alexander Schmid
11	(Italy) Luca de Aliprandini	+0.06
10	(France) Mathieu Faivre
2	(Austria) Fabio Gstrein	+0.02

Semifinals
1	(Switzerland) Loïc Meillard	+0.02
13	(Croatia) Filip Zubčić
3	(Germany) Alexander Schmid	+1.39
10	(France) Mathieu Faivre

Final
13	(Croatia) Filip Zubčić	+0.48
10	(France) Mathieu Faivre
Third place
1	(Switzerland) Loïc Meillard
3	(Germany) Alexander Schmid	DNF
