= Daniel Albrecht =

Swiss alpine skier

Personal information
- Born: 25 May 1983 (age 43) Fiesch, Valais, Switzerland
- Height: 1.83 m (6 ft 0 in)
- Website: Daniel-Albrecht.ch

Skiing career
- Country: Switzerland
- Sport: Alpine skiing
- Club: Fiesch Eggishorn
- Retired: 6 October 2013 (age 30)
- Disciplines: Downhill, super-G, giant slalom, slalom, combined
- World Cup debut: 23 January 2003 (age 19)

Olympics
- Teams: 1 – (2006)
- Medals: 0

World Championships
- Teams: 3 – (2003, 2005, 2007)
- Medals: 3 (1 gold)

World Cup
- Seasons: 7 – (2005–09, 2011–12)
- Wins: 4 – (3 GS, 1 SC)
- Podiums: 8 – (1 DH, 4 GS, 1 SL, 2 SC)
- Overall titles: 0 – (7th in 2008)
- Discipline titles: 0 – (3rd in K, 2008)
Medal record
Men's alpine skiing
Representing Switzerland
World Championships
| Gold medal – first place | 2007 Åre | Combined |
| Silver medal – second place | 2007 Åre | Giant slalom |
| Bronze medal – third place | 2007 Åre | Team event |
Junior World Championships
| Gold medal – first place | 2003 Serre Chevalier | Downhill |
| Gold medal – first place | 2003 Serre Chevalier | Giant slalom |
| Gold medal – first place | 2003 Serre Chevalier | Combined |
| Silver medal – second place | 2003 Serre Chevalier | Slalom |

Daniel Albrecht (born 25 May 1983) is a retired World Cup alpine ski racer from Switzerland. He competed in all five alpine disciplines and was a world champion in super combined in 2007. Albrecht was severely injured in a downhill training run at Kitzbühel in 2009 at age 25.

== Racing career ==
Born in Fiesch in the canton of Valais, Albrecht made his World Cup debut at age 19 in January 2003 in a slalom at Schladming, Austria. A few weeks later, he competed in the slalom at the 2003 World Championships at St. Moritz. That March, he won three gold medals and a silver at the Junior World Championships at Serre Chevalier, France.

At the 2007 World Championships in Åre, Sweden, Albrecht won the gold medal in the super combined event, and took the silver medal in the giant slalom. A month later he made his first World Cup podium, a second-place finish in the downhill at Lenzerheide. Eight months later he won his first World Cup race, a super combined at Beaver Creek, Colorado, followed by a giant slalom victory three days later.

Albrecht has four World Cup victories, eight podiums, and 22 top ten finishes.

=== Hahnenkammrennen injury ===
At Kitzbühel, Austria, on Thursday, 22 January 2009, Albrecht crashed in the final downhill training run on the Hahnenkamm's Streif course; he sustained brain and lung trauma and was placed in an induced coma. The fifth racer on the course, Albrecht was traveling at 138 km/h (86 mph) when he lost control on the final jump (Zielsprung) and flew through the air for about 40 metres (130 ft). He landed on his back, bounced forward onto his knees, then his face, and came to a stop near the finish line. Unconscious, Albrecht received medical attention for about 20 minutes before being airlifted by helicopter to a hospital in nearby St. Johann; he was later transferred to the university hospital in Innsbruck.

Two days later, Dr. Wolfgang Koller announced that the risk on Albrecht's life was decreasing. Dr. Markus Wambacher said that the pressure inside his head was lessening and that he could make a full recovery. He also stated that Albrecht, age 25, had problems with his knees and stomach. He was removed from the induced coma after three weeks, on 12 February, and doctors reported that he was breathing on his own.

==== Recovery ====
Albrecht expectedly missed the remainder of the 2009 season but had recovered sufficiently to train with the Swiss ski team in October, less than nine months after the crash. Still not ready for World Cup competition, he sat out the 2010 season, missing the Winter Olympics in Canada.

Albrecht returned to the World Cup circuit in the giant slalom at Beaver Creek in December 2010 and finished 21st. Albrecht raced his first speed event of his comeback in Switzerland at Wengen in January 2011, the downhill portion of the super combined on a shortened Lauberhorn course. He missed a gate just after the high-speed Hannegschuss, about fifteen seconds from the finish, and safely skied off of the course.

=== Knee injury ===
During a training run for the Lake Louise downhill in November 2012, Albrecht crashed and suffered a dislocated left kneecap with torn ligaments, and underwent surgery in Switzerland. Less than a year later on 6 October 2013, he announced his retirement from racing.

== World Cup results ==
=== Race podiums ===
- 4 wins – (3 GS, 1 SC)
- 8 podiums – (1 DH, 4 GS, 1 SL, 2 SC)

| Season | Date | Location | Discipline | Place |
|---|---|---|---|---|
| 2007 | (Sweden) 2007 World Championships | | | |
| 2007 | 14 Mar 2007 | Lenzerheide, Switzerland | Downhill | 2nd |
| 2008 | 29 Nov 2007 | (United States) Beaver Creek, USA | Super combined | 1st |
| 2008 | 2 Dec 2007 | (United States) Beaver Creek, USA | Giant slalom | 1st |
| 2008 | 5 Jan 2008 | Adelboden, Switzerland | Giant slalom | 2nd |
| 2008 | 11 Jan 2008 | Wengen, Switzerland | Super combined | 2nd |
| 2008 | 15 Mar 2008 | Bormio, Italy | Slalom | 2nd |
| 2009 | 26 Oct 2008 | Sölden, Austria | Giant slalom | 1st |
| 2009 | 21 Dec 2008 | Alta Badia, Italy | Giant slalom | 1st |

=== Season standings ===
| Season | Age | Overall | Slalom | Giant slalom | Super-G | Downhill | Combined |
|---|---|---|---|---|---|---|---|
| 2005 | 21 | 53 | 34 | 43 | — | — | 4 |
| 2006 | 22 | 50 | 26 | 30 | — | — | 36 |
| 2007 | 23 | 27 | 22 | 20 | 31 | 30 | 18 |
| 2008 | 24 | 7 | 18 | 5 | 23 | 43 | 3 |
| 2009 | 25 | 20 | 55 | 7 | 23 | 22 | 18 |
| 2010 | 26 | Did not compete, severely injured in January 2009 | | | | | |
| 2011 | 27 | 140 | — | 42 | — | — | — |
| 2012 | 28 | 152 | — | 52 | — | — | — |
| 2013 | 29 | Did not compete, injured left knee in November 2012 | | | | | |

== World Championship results ==
| Year | Age | Slalom | Giant slalom | Super-G | Downhill | Combined |
|---|---|---|---|---|---|---|
| 2003 | 19 | 30 | — | — | — | — |
| 2005 | 21 | DNF1 | 30 | — | — | 7 |
| 2007 | 23 | DNF1 | 2 | 4 | 6 | 1 |

== Olympic results ==
| Year | Age | Slalom | Giant slalom | Super-G | Downhill | Combined |
|---|---|---|---|---|---|---|
| 2006 | 22 | DNF2 | DNF1 | — | — | 4 |

== Videos ==
- YouTube video – Daniel Albrecht – training run crash at Kitzbühel – 22 Jan 2009
- YouTube video – Daniel Albrecht – returns in GS at Alta Badia – 19 Dec 2010
