= Barbara Kantorová =

Slovak alpine skier (born 1992)

Personal information
- Born: 3 March 1992 (age 34) Poprad, Slovakia
- Height: 169 cm (5 ft 7 in)

Skiing career
- Sport: Alpine skiing ♀
- Disciplines: Slalom, giant slalom, Downhill, super-G, Alpine Combined
- World Cup debut: 11 January 2011 (age 18)

Olympics
- Teams: 2 – (2014-2018)

World Championships
- Teams: 1 – (2013)

World Cup
- Seasons: 8 – (2011–18)
- Overall titles: 0 – (111th in 2011)
- Discipline titles: 0 – (39th in AC, 2018)
Medal record
Alpine skiing
Representing Slovakia
Winter Universiade
Silver medal – second place	2013 Trentino	Combined
Bronze medal – third place	2017 Almaty	Combined

Barbara Kantorová (born 3 March 1992 in Poprad, Slovakia) is an alpine skier from Slovakia. She competed for Slovakia at the 2014 Winter Olympics in the alpine skiing events.

== World Cup results ==
=== Season standings ===
Season	Age	Overall	Slalom	Giant slalom	Super-G	Downhill	Combined
2011	19	didn't earn a World Cup point					
2012	20	111	52	—	—	—	—
2013	21	didn't earn a World Cup point					
2014	22	didn't earn a World Cup point					
2015	23	didn't earn a World Cup point					
2016	24	didn't earn a World Cup point					
2017	25	114	—	—	—	—	47
2018	26	128	—	—	—	—	39

=== Results per discipline ===
Discipline	WC starts	WC Top 30	WC Top 15	WC Top 5	WC Podium	Best result		
Discipline	WC starts	WC Top 30	WC Top 15	WC Top 5	WC Podium	Date	Location	Place
Slalom	20	1	0	0	0	22 January 2012	Kranjska Gora, Slovenia	24th
Giant slalom	13	0	0	0	0	26 November 2011	Aspen, United States	42nd
Super-G	8	0	0	0	0	25 February 2017	Crans-Montana, Switzerland	39th
Downhill	1	0	0	0	0	19 January 2018	Cortina d'Ampezzo, Italy	40th
Combined	5	2	0	0	0	26 February 2017	Crans-Montana, Switzerland	24th
Total	47	3	0	0	0			

- Standings through 21 December 2020

== World Championship results ==
Year
Year	Age	Slalom	Giant; Slalom	Super G	Downhill	Combined	Team Event
2013	20	—	33	—	—	—	—

== Olympic results ==
Year
Year	Age	Slalom	Giant; Slalom	Super G	Downhill	Combined	Team event
2014	21	DNF1	38	22	—	—	—N/a
2018	26	34	41	35	29	18	—
