= Veronica Smedh =

Swedish alpine skier (born 1988)

Veronica Smedh (born 1988) is a retired Swedish alpine skier.

Competing at the Junior World Championships in 2005, 2006, 2007 and 2008, her biggest success came at the 2008 edition with 5th and 4th places in slalom and giant slalom respectively. She also competed at the 2011 and 2013 Winter Universiade, claiming the bronze medal in giant slalom at the latter competition.

She made her FIS Alpine Ski World Cup debut in November 2007 in Reiteralm, being disqualified. She collected her first World Cup points with a 22nd place in February 2008 in Zagreb, then a 19th place in the 2008–09 World Cup opener in Sölden. She improved even further to a 13th place in December 2008 in La Molina, but this was also the last World Cup race she managed to finish. Between then and her last World Cup outing in March 2013 in Ofterschwang, she either exited or was disqualified in 37 World Cup races. Her sole finish was a 30th place in giant slalom at the 2009 World Championships.

She represented the sports club Sundsvalls SLK.
