= Ekaterina Tkachenko =

Russian alpine skier (born 1995)

Yekaterina Tkachenko
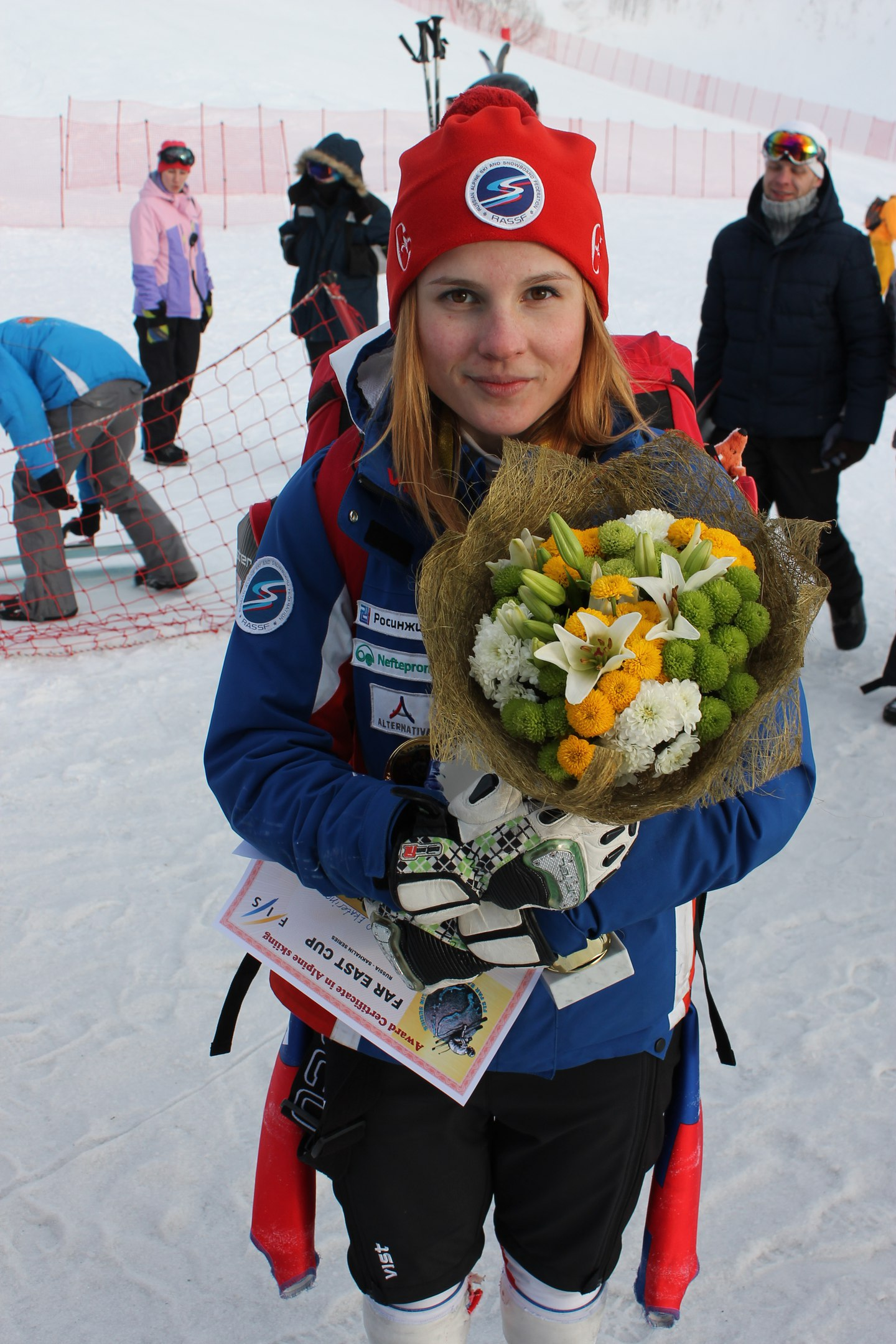
- Tkachenko in 2016

Personal information
- Full name: Yekaterina Igorevna Tkachenko
- Born: 7 March 1995 (age 31) Harare, Zimbabwe

Sport
- Country: Russia
- Sport: Skiing
Medal record
Representing Russia
Winter Universiade
Gold medal – first place	2019 Krasnoyarsk	Slalom
Gold medal – first place	2019 Krasnoyarsk	Giant slalom
Silver medal – second place	2019 Krasnoyarsk	Parallel team event

Yekaterina Igorevna Tkachenko (Russian: Екатери́на И́горевна Ткаче́нко; born 7 March 1995 in Harare) is a Zimbabwean-born Russian alpine ski racer, a slalom specialist.
