= Lisa Bremseth =

Norwegian alpine skier (born 1979)

Lisa Bremseth (born 25 June 1979) is a Norwegian alpine skier.

Competing at the 1997, 1998 and 1999 Junior World Championships, her best finish being a 13th place from 1999. In the 2003 and 2005 Alpine World Ski Championships her best placement was 28th in giant slalom in 2005.

She made her FIS Alpine Ski World Cup debut in December 2000 in Sestriere. After DNF'ing ro DNQ'ing in her first eleven races, she collected her first World Cup points with a 21st-place finish in December 2002 in Lenzerheide. The week after she recorded her first and only top 10-placement, a 10th place in slalom in Semmering. Her last World Cup outing came in March 2006 with a 28th place in the Hafjell giant slalom.

She is a Trondheim native and represented the sports club SK Freidig.
