= Philippe Hardy =

French alpine skier (1954–1984)

Philippe Hardy (5 July 1954 – 1984) was a French alpine skier who competed in the 1976 Winter Olympics in the giant slalom; he placed 27th with a time of 3:40.43.
