= Aurélie Richard =

French Para alpine skier (born 2005)

Personal information
- Born: 15 June 2005 (age 21) Gap, Hautes-Alpes, France

Sport
- Country: France
- Sport: Para alpine skiing
- Disability: Agenesis
Medal record
Women's Para alpine skiing
Representing France
Paralympic Games
Silver medal – second place	2026 Milano Cortina	Downhill standing
Silver medal – second place	2026 Milano Cortina	Super-G standing
Silver medal – second place	2026 Milano Cortina	Super combined standing
Bronze medal – third place	2026 Milano Cortina	Giant slalom standing
World Championships
Silver medal – second place	2023 Lleida	Downhill standing
Silver medal – second place	2023 Lleida	Slalom standing
Bronze medal – third place	2023 Lleida	Alpine combined standing
World University Games
Gold medal – first place	2025 Turin	Giant slalom standing
Gold medal – first place	2025 Turin	Super-G standing

Aurélie Richard (born 15 June 2005) is a French Para alpine skier.

== Career ==
Richard competed at the 2023 World Para Alpine Skiing Championships and won silver medals in the downhill and slalom events, and a bronze medal in the alpine combine event. In February 2024, she suffered a torn ACL in her left knee.

She competed at the 2025 Winter World University Games in para alpine skiing and won gold medals in the giant slalom and Super-G standing events.

She won the 2025–26 FIS Para Alpine Ski World Cup crystal globe in the downhill and the overall World Cup title. In February 2026, she was selected to represent France at the 2026 Winter Paralympics.

== Personal life ==
Richard was born with agenesis of the left forearm.
