= Dagmara Krzyżyńska =

Polish skier (born 1981)

Personal information
- Nationality: Polish
- Born: 12 April 1981 (age 43); Kowary, Poland

Sport
- Sport: Alpine skiing

Dagmara Krzyżyńska (born 12 April 1981) is a Polish alpine skier. She competed in the women's giant slalom at the 2006 Winter Olympics.
