= Aleksandra Kluś =

Polish alpine skier (born 1986)

Personal information
- Full name: Aleksandra Kluś-Zamiedzowy
- Born: 31 July 1986 (age 39) Zakopane, Poland

Sport
- Country: Poland
- Sport: Alpine skiing
Medal record
Women's alpine skiing
Representing Poland
Winter Universiade
| Silver medal – second place | 2007 Turin | Slalom |
| Silver medal – second place | 2011 Erzurum | Slalom |
| Bronze medal – third place | 2009 Harbin | Slalom |
| Bronze medal – third place | 2011 Erzurum | Combined classification |

Aleksandra Kluś-Zamiedzowy (born 31 July 1986 in Zakopane) is an alpine skier from Poland. She competed for Poland at the 2014 Winter Olympics in the alpine skiing events.
