= Alpine skiing at the 2015 Winter Universiade =

Alpine skiing at the 2015 Winter Universiade was held at the Universiade Slope in the Sierra Nevada Ski Station, Granada, from February 6 to February 14, 2015.

== Men's events ==
Event	Gold		Silver		Bronze	
Super-G	(Italy) Michelangelo Tentori	1:23.74	(Andorra) Marc Oliveras	1:23.75	(Switzerland) Sandro Boner	1:24.23
Giant slalom	(Italy) Michelangelo Tentori	1:37.46	(Italy) Rocco Delsante	1:37.81	(France) Jonas Fabre	1:38.00
Slalom	(Switzerland) Ramon Zenhäusern	1:35.86	(Slovakia) Matej Falat	1:39.54	(Slovenia) Filip Mlinšek	1:39.59
Combined	(Switzerland) Sandro Boner	2:04.70	(Italy) Giulio Bosca	2:05.05	(Slovakia) Matej Falat	2:05.06
Combined classification	(Switzerland) Sandro Boner	414	(Czech Republic) Adam Zika	344	(Italy) Michelangelo Tentori	319

== Women's events ==
Event	Gold		Silver		Bronze	
Super-G	(Norway) Kristine Fausa Aasberg	1:26.61	(Poland) Karolina Chrapek	1:27.25	(Sweden) Helena Rapaport	1:27.43
Giant slalom	(Norway) Kristine Fausa Aasberg	2:09.56	(Poland) Sabina Majerczyk	2:12.09	(Andorra) Carmina Pallas	2:12.77
Slalom	(Norway) Thea Grosvold	1:38.72	(Germany) Monica Hübner	1:39.19	(Canada) Eve Routhier	1:39.33
Combined	(Russia) Daria Ovchinnikova	1:49.80	(Czech Republic) Pavla Klicnarová	1:50.06	(Norway) Maren Nessen Byrkjeland	1:50.21
Combined classification	(Norway) Maren Nessen Byrkjeland	388	(Andorra) Carmina Pallas	387	(Slovakia) Jana Gantnerová	372

== Medal table ==
Rank	Nation	Gold	Silver	Bronze	Total
1	Norway	4	0	1	5
2	Switzerland	3	0	1	4
3	Italy	2	2	1	5
4	Russia	1	0	0	1
5	Andorra	0	2	1	3
6	Czech Republic	0	2	0	2
6	Poland	0	2	0	2
8	Slovakia	0	1	2	3
9	Germany	0	1	0	1
10	Canada	0	0	1	1
10	France	0	0	1	1
10	Slovenia	0	0	1	1
10	Sweden	0	0	1	1
Totals (13 entries)		10	10	10	30
