= Klusek =

Klusek may refer to:

- Klusek, Gostynin County, Poland
- Klusek, Pułtusk County, Poland
- Bartłomiej Kłusek (born 1993), Polish ski jumper and coach
- Danuta Kłusek, birth name of Danuta Gruszka, Polish chess Woman FIDE Master
