= Ana Jelušić Black =

Croatian alpine skier

Ana Jelušić
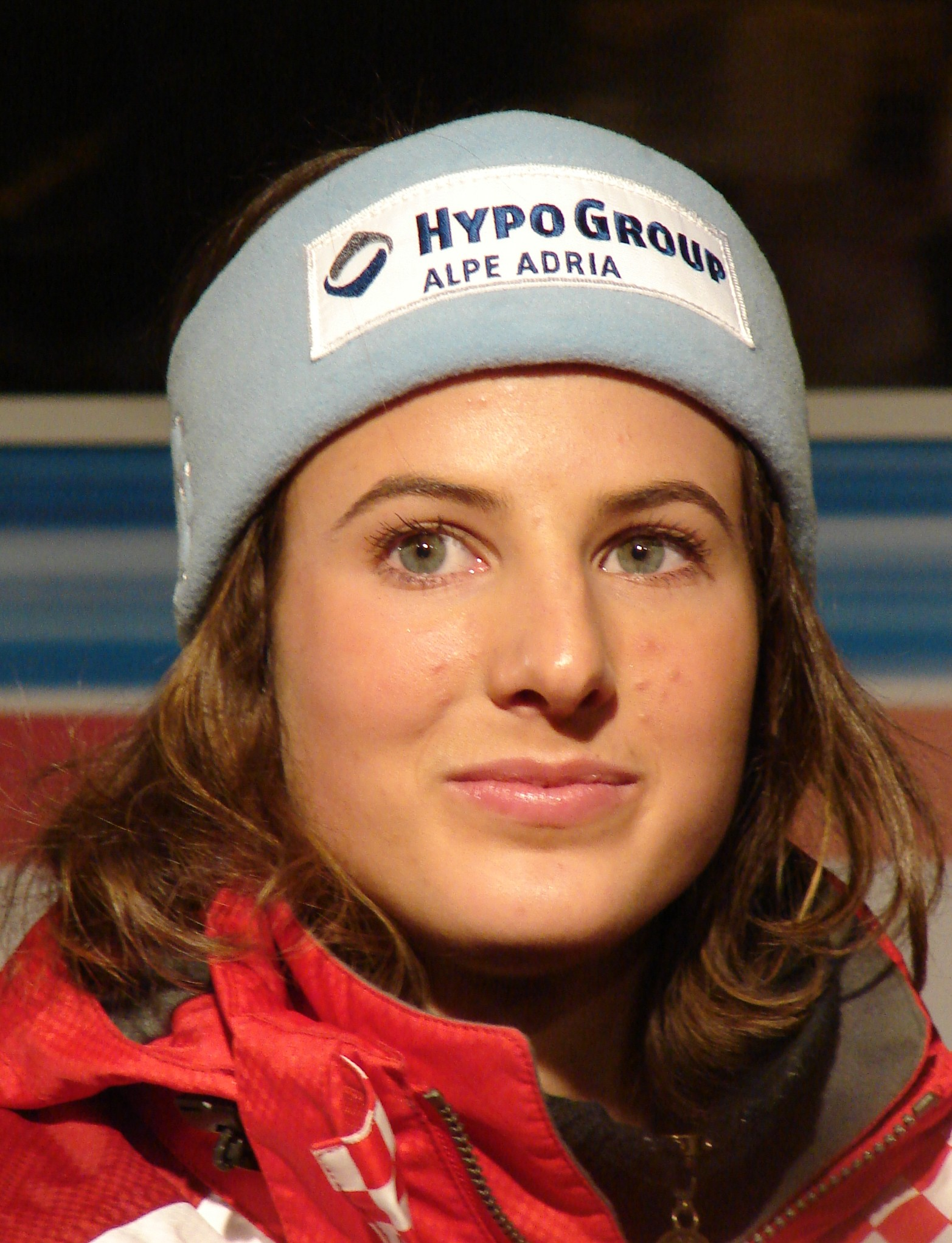
- Jelušić in December 2006

Personal information
- Born: 28 December 1986 (age 39) Rijeka, SR Croatia, SFR Yugoslavia
- Height: 1.65 m (5 ft 5 in)

Skiing career
- Sport: Alpine skiing
- Club: SK Platak
- Retired: April 2012 (age 25)
- Disciplines: Slalom, giant slalom
- World Cup debut: 26 October 2002 (age 15)

Olympics
- Teams: 3 - (2002, 2006, 2010)
- Medals: 0

World Championships
- Teams: 5 - (2003–2011)
- Medals: 0

World Cup
- Seasons: 8 - (2004–2011)
- Wins: 0
- Podiums: 2 - (2 SL)
- Overall titles: 0 - (22nd in 2007)
- Discipline titles: 0 - (7th in SL, 2007)
Medal record
Women's alpine skiing
Representing Croatia
Junior World Ski Championships
Silver medal – second place	2003 Montgenèvre	Slalom
Bronze medal – third place	2005 Bardonecchia	Slalom

Ana Jelušić Black (born 28 December 1986) is a former World Cup alpine ski racer from Croatia.

Born in Rijeka, at the time SR Croatia, SFR Yugoslavia, Jelušić specialized in slalom and competed in the 2002 Winter Olympics at age 15, the youngest competitor at those games.

On 4 January 2007, she was the runner-up in the World Cup slalom race (Snow Queen Trophy) at Sljeme mountain in Croatia, won by Marlies Schild of Austria.

A month later at the 2007 World Championships in Sweden, Jelušić finished fourth in the women's slalom.

She has stated that she admires and looks up to fellow countrywoman Janica Kostelić for inspiration, and hopes to follow in her footsteps.

Jelušić sat out the entire 2012 season due to ongoing problems with asthma during the 2011 season. She announced her retirement from competition in April 2012 and became a media coordinator for FIS, focusing on men's alpine skiing.

During her World Cup career, she attained two podiums and 17 top ten finishes, all in slalom.

== Personal life ==
As of 2016, Jelušić lives with her husband in Lausanne, where they both work for the International Olympic Committee.

== World Cup results ==
=== Season standings ===
Season	Age	Overall	Slalom	Giant slalom	Super-G	Downhill	Combined
2003	16	98	—	41	—	—	—
2004	17	78	33	—	—	—	—
2005	18	51	20	45	—	—	—
2006	19	47	19	46	—	—	—
2007	20	22	7	54	—	—	—
2008	21	39	11	—	—	—	—
2009	22	36	12	—	—	—	—
2010	23	52	13	—	—	—	—
2011	24	70	25	—	—	—	—

=== Race podiums ===
- 2 podiums – (2 slalom)

Season	Date	Location	Discipline	Place
2007	4 Jan 2007	Zagreb, Croatia	Slalom	2nd
2008	25 Nov 2007	Panorama, Canada	Slalom	3rd
