= Cécile Prince =

French alpine skier (born 1937)

Personal information
- Nationality: French
- Born: 15 May 1937 (age 87); Grenoble, France

Sport
- Sport: Alpine skiing

Cécile Prince (born 15 May 1937) is a French alpine skier. She competed in the women's slalom at the 1964 Winter Olympics.
