= Heidi Obrecht =

Swiss alpine skier (born 1942)

Personal information
- Nationality: Swiss
- Born: 6 May 1942 (age 82); Bern, Switzerland

Sport
- Sport: Alpine skiing

Heidi Obrecht (born 6 May 1942) is a Swiss alpine skier. She competed in two events at the 1964 Winter Olympics.
