= Alpine skiing at the 2019 Winter Universiade =

Alpine skiing at the XXIX Winter Universiade
- Dates: 3–11 March 2019
- Competitors: 209 from 39 nations

Alpine skiing at the 2019 Winter Universiade was held at the Funpark Bobrovy Log in Krasnoyarsk from 3 to 11 March 2019.

== Men's events ==
Event	Gold		Silver		Bronze	
Super-G	(Switzerland) Lukas Zippert	57.04	(Czech Republic) Tomáš Klinský	57.24	(Switzerland) Yannick Chabloz	57.33
Combined	(Switzerland) Yannick Chabloz	1:35.59	(Russia) Anton Endzhievskiy	1:35.73	(Russia) Nikita Alekhin	1:35.75
Giant slalom	(Russia) Ivan Kuznetsov	1:55.51	(Italy) Alberto Blengini	1:56.03	(Switzerland) Livio Simonet	1:56.21
Slalom	(Russia) Simon Efimov	1:27.14	(Austria) Richard Leitgeb	1:28.08	(France) Paco Rassat	1:28.36

== Women's events ==
Event	Gold		Silver		Bronze	
Super-G	(Austria) Jessica Gfrerer	58.44	(Switzerland) Amélie Dupasquier	59.53	(Sweden) Fanny Axelsson	59.70
Combined	(Austria) Jessica Gfrerer	1:31.38	(Switzerland) Amélie Dupasquier	1:31.93	(France) Carmen Haro	1:32.12
Giant slalom	(Russia) Ekaterina Tkachenko	1:58.52	(Austria) Denise Dingsleder	1:59.39	(Russia) Yulia Pleshkova	1:59.46
Slalom	(Russia) Ekaterina Tkachenko	1:32.45	(Austria) Denise Dingsleder	1:32.91	(Russia) Anastasia Gornostaeva	1:33.25

== Team event ==
Event	Gold	Silver	Bronze
Parallel team event	Austria; Jessica Gfrerer; Richard Leitgeb; Denise Dingsleder; Julian Kienreich	Russia; Sofia Krokhina; Denis Vorobev; Ekaterina Tkachenko; Nikita Alekhin	Sweden; Agnes Dahlin; Filip Steinwall; Louise Jansson; Jacob Persson

== Medal table ==
Rank	Nation	Gold	Silver	Bronze	Total
1	Russia*	4	2	3	9
2	Austria	3	3	0	6
3	Switzerland	2	2	2	6
4	Czech Republic	0	1	0	1
4	Italy	0	1	0	1
6	France	0	0	2	2
6	Sweden	0	0	2	2
Totals (7 entries)		9	9	9	27
