= Gerald W. Clusen =

Gerald W. Clusen is a retired Rear Admiral in the United States Navy.

== Biography ==
A native of Manitowoc, Wisconsin, Clusen graduated from the University of Wisconsin–La Crosse with a B.S. in computer science with a minor in mathematics. In civilian life, Clusen worked for Kimberly-Clark for more than 28 years.

== Career ==
Clusen originally enlisted in the United States Navy Reserve in 1971. During the Vietnam War, he served aboard the USS Oklahoma City. Following the war, he served aboard the USS John F. Kennedy and the USS Richmond K. Turner. Commissioned as an officer in 1983, he was assigned to the Naval Security Group. In October 2010, he was named Reserve Deputy Commander of the United States Tenth Fleet.

Awards he has received include the Meritorious Service Medal with award star, the Navy Commendation Medal, and the Navy Achievement Medal with two award stars.
