= Jana Gantnerová =

Slovak alpine skier (born 1989)

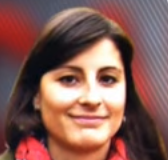

Personal information
- Born: 15 July 1989 Kežmarok, Czechoslovakia
- Height: 165 cm (5 ft 5 in)

Sport
- Sport: Skiing
- Club: Ski Klub Zelené Pleso
Medal record
Women's alpine skiing
Representing Slovakia
Universiade
Gold medal – first place	2013 Trentino	Combined
Silver medal – second place	2013 Trentino	Downhill
Bronze medal – third place	2011 Erzurum	Slalom
Bronze medal – third place	2015 Granada	Combined class.

Jana Gantnerová (born 15 July 1989 in Kežmarok) is a Slovak Alpine skier.

She made her debut in the Alpine Skiing World Cup on 22 October 2005, but she has yet to place in the top 30 in any World Cup event.

Gantnerová took part in the 2006 Winter Olympics and also represented Slovakia at the 2010 Winter Olympics.

She is the daughter of alpine skier Jana Gantnerová-Šoltýsová and Juraj Gantner, a former ski mountaineer who is also Jana's coach.
