= Guglielmo Bosca =

Italian alpine skier

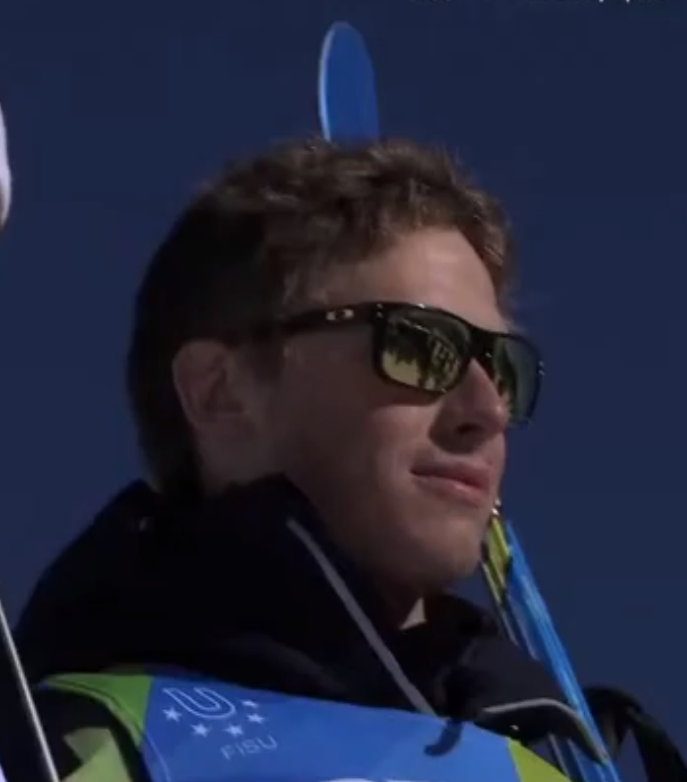
- Bosca on 2013 Super-G Winter Universiade podium.

Personal information
- Born: 5 June 1993 (age 33) Milan, Italy
- Height: 1.81 m (5 ft 11 in)
- Family: Giulio Bosca (brother)

Skiing career
- Country: Italy
- Sport: Alpine skiing
- Club: C.S. Esercito
- Disciplines: Downhill, super-G
- World Cup debut: 22 January 2016 (age 22)

World Championships
- Teams: 1 – (2023)
- Medals: 0

World Cup
- Seasons: 9 – (2016–2018, 2020–2024, 2026)
- Wins: 0
- Podiums: 1 – (1 SG)
- Overall titles: 0 – (25th in 2024)
- Discipline titles: 0 – (5th in SG, 2024)
Medal record
Men's alpine skiing
Representing Italy
Winter Universiade
Bronze medal – third place	2013 Passo San Pellegrino	Downhill
Bronze medal – third place	2013 Passo San Pellegrino	Super-G

Guglielmo "Gugu" Bosca (born 5 June 1993) is an Italian World Cup alpine ski racer who specializes in the speed events of super-G and downhill.

He is the brother of the RAI technical commentator of ski races as well as former World Cup alpine skier Giulio Bosca.

== Career ==
During his World Cup career, he has achieved nine top-ten results, with one podium finish.

== World Cup results ==
=== Season standings ===
Season
Season	Age	Overall	Slalom	Giant slalom	Super-G	Downhill	Combined	Parallel
2017	23	156	—	—	51	—	—	—N/a
2018	24	no World Cup points earned						—N/a
2019	25	did not compete						—N/a
2020	26	155	—	—	—	—	41	—
2021	27	148	—	—	54	—	—N/a	—
2022	28	83	—	—	39	35	—N/a	—
2023	29	67	—	—	20	56	—N/a	—N/a
2024	30	25	—	—	5	25	—N/a	—N/a
2025	31	did not compete					—N/a	—N/a
2026	32	63	—	—	18	51	—N/a	—N/a

=== Top-ten finishes ===
- 0 wins
- 1 podium (1 SG); 9 top tens (8 SG, 1 DH)

Season
Season	Date	Location	Discipline	Place
2022	4 March 2022	Kvitfjell, Norway	Downhill	9th
2023	29 January 2023	Cortina d'Ampezzo, Italy	Super-G	9th
2024	15 December 2023	Val Gardena, Italy	Super-G	10th
2024	12 January 2024	Wengen, Switzerland	Super-G	5th
2024	27 January 2024	Garmisch-Partenkirchen, Germany	Super-G	2nd
2024	18 February 2024	Kvitfjell, Norway	Super-G	6th
2024	22 March 2024	Saalbach, Austria	Super-G	10th
2026	27 November 2025	Copper Mountain, United States	Super-G	8th
2026	27 December 2025	Livigno, Italy	Super-G	8th

== World Championship results ==
Year
Year	Age	Slalom	Giant slalom	Super-G	Downhill	Combined	Parallel	Team event
2023	29	—	—	26	—	—	—	—
