= Karolina Chrapek =

Polish alpine skier (born 1990)

Personal information
- Born: 18 January 1990 (age 36) Würzburg, Germany
- Height: 1.73 m (5 ft 8 in)
- Weight: 69 kg (152 lb)
Medal record
Women's alpine skiing
Representing Poland
Winter Universiade
Silver medal – second place	2011 Erzurum	Super-G
Silver medal – second place	2013 Trentino	Super-G
Silver medal – second place	2015 Granada	Super-G
Bronze medal – third place	2011 Erzurum	Giant slalom
Bronze medal – third place	2013 Trentino	Downhill

Karolina Chrapek (born 18 January 1990 in Würzburg, Germany) is an alpine skier representing Poland. She competed for Poland at the 2014 Winter Olympics in the alpine skiing events. She finished 17th in the combined, 33rd in the downhill and giant slalom, and failed to finish the slalom and super-G. She also competed at the FIS Alpine World Ski Championships in 2011 and 2013. In 2011, she finished 20th in the super combined, 33rd in the slalom and 34th in the super-G, while in 2013 she finished 27th in the super combined. Chrapek also competed at the 2013 Winter Universiade, where she finished second in the super-G and third in the downhill.
