= Line Viken =

Norwegian alpine skier (born 1981)

Line Viken (born 10 August 1981) is a Norwegian alpine skier.

Competing at the 2000 and 2001 Junior World Championships, her best finish was a 12th place from 2000. In the 2003 and 2005 Alpine World Ski Championships her best placement was 17th in slalom in 2003.

She made her FIS Alpine Ski World Cup debut in December 2001 in Sestriere and collected her first World Cup points with a 22nd-place finish in January 2002 in Maribor. She finished in the top 10 three times in 2004, all in the slalom. Viken only managed to finish three of her last eighteen World Cup races, and a 20th place in March 2007 in Zwiesel became her last World Cup outing.

She was born in Namsos Municipality, but represented the sports club Grong IL.
