= Bohumír Zeman =

Czech alpine skier (born 1957)

Bohumír Zeman (born 26 May 1957 in Vrchlabí) is a Czech former alpine skier who competed for Czechoslovakia in the 1976 Winter Olympics and 1980 Winter Olympics.
