= Matej Falat =

Slovak alpine skier (born 1993)

Personal information
- Born: 8 February 1993 (age 33) Bojnice, Slovakia
- Height: 1.85 m (6 ft 1 in)

Skiing career
- Sport: Alpine skiing
- Club: Ski Alp klub Drienica
- Disciplines: Slalom, giant slalom, super-G
Medal record
Men's alpine skiing
Representing Slovakia
World Championships
Silver medal – second place	2017 St. Moritz	Team event
Winter Universiade
Silver medal – second place	2015 Granada	Slalom
Bronze medal – third place	2015 Granada	Combined
Bronze medal – third place	2017 Almaty	Combined

Matej Falat (born 8 February 1993) is a Slovak alpine skier. He competed for Slovakia at the 2014 Winter Olympics in the alpine skiing events. Won a silver medal at the 2017 World Alpine Skiing Championships in the mixed team event.

== World Championship results ==
Year	Age	Slalom	Giant Slalom	Super G	Downhill	Combined	Team Event
(Germany) 2011 Ga-Pa	18	—	—	36	—	24	—
(Austria) 2013 Schladming	20	BDNS1	DNF1	50	—	DNF2	—
(United States) 2015 Vail-Beaver Creek	22	did not compete					
(Switzerland) 2017 St. Moritz	24	—	37	—	—	—	2

== Olympic results ==
Year	Age	Slalom	Giant Slalom	Super G	Downhill	Combined
(Russia) 2014 Sochi	21	DNF1	—	42	—	DNF1
