= Giulio Bosca =

Italian alpine skier (born 1990)

Personal information
- Full name: Giulio Giovanni Bosca
- Born: 3 February 1990 (age 36) Turin, Italy

Skiing career
- Sport: Alpine skiing
- Club: G.S. Esercito
- Disciplines: Polyvalent
- World Cup debut: 2013

World Cup
- Seasons: 9
Medal record
Winter Universiade
Gold medal – first place	2017 Almaty	Giant slalom
Silver medal – second place	2013 Fassa Valley	Giant slalom
Silver medal – second place	2015 Sierra Nevada	Super combined

Giulio Bosca (born 3 February 1990) is a retired Italian World Cup alpine ski racer who won three medals at the Winter Universiade and won two Italian National Titles. He is now an announcer for National television RAI and a wine producer at his family winery Tosti1820.

He is the brother of Guglielmo, himself a high-level alpine skier.

== Biography ==
In 2021, still in the midst of his competitive activity, on 8 February he had won a FIS giant slalom race in Les Gets in France, he was called by RAI to replace Paolo De Chiesa, who fell ill with COVID-19, as technical commentator for the races of the Cortina 2021 ski world championships.

== World Cup results ==
Best result in World Cup obtained in Kranjska Gora on 3 March 2018, where he finished 18th. His last World Cup race was Lenzerheide 2 March 2020, where he did not finish the first run.

== European Cup results ==
Podium

Date	Place	Discipline	Rank
27-02-2018	(Andorra) Soldeu	Giant slalom	3rd
14-03-2018	(Switzerland) St. Moritz	Giant slalom	2nd

=== National titles ===
- Italian Alpine Ski Championships
  - Giant slalom: 2017, 2018
