= Tamara Wolf =

Swiss alpine skier

Tamara Wolf (born November 3, 1985) is a former Swiss ski racer. She became junior world champion in downhill in 2003 and achieved a top 10 place in the world cup. Her career was interrupted several times due to serious injuries.

== Biography and career ==
Tamara Wolf had participated in FIS races and national championships from the season of winter 2000-01 . She participated in the first European Cup races in March 2002. After her first victory and several podium places in FIS races as well as three top 20 placements in the European Cup, the then 17-year-old was also compete in the 2003 Junior World Championships in France. There, she won the gold medal in the downhill ahead of Lindsey Kildow and Julia Mancuso. She finished 17th in the giant slalom and 19th in the Super-G. As a junior world champion, she was also allowed to go downhill to the World Cup finals in Lillehammertake part. In her World Cup debut, she finished 19th. The Swiss Sports Aid Foundation recognized Wolf as the young athlete of the year 2003.

In the years that followed, her career was interrupted several times by serious injuries. In August 2003 she tore a cruciate ligament while training in Las Leñas, Argentina, resulting her unable to continue the ski season of winter of 2003–04. The next season 2004–05, she fell in the FIS giant slalom in Sestola and suffered from leg injury. Her second comeback in winter 2005-06 was interrupted again at the end of January when she suffered a concussion during the European Cup training in Megèveand suffered a broken bone in her upper arm. After a six-week break, she took part in competitions again and reached her first podium in the European Cup on March 17, 2006 with third place in the downhill from Altenmarkt-Zauchensee . In the next winter she was allowed to take part in a World Cup race in Altenmarkt-Zauchensee for the second time in her career. In this downhill run on January 13, 2007, Wolf finished eighth with starting number 45. In the 2007 World Cup in Åre, Sweden, she started in the super combined and finished 26th. On March 3, 2007 Wolf suffered another injury, caused by a fall on the World Cup run in Tarvisio, she suffered a concussion and a torn inner ligament in her right knee.

Before her next comeback, Wolf trained with the Karl Frehsner. Subsequently, Wolf won at the Universiade in February 2009 in Harbin, China, where she participated again in competitions for the first time in nearly two years - two gold medals in downhill and Super-G.

In the European Cup, she often did not reach the points, or only just barely, and so she lost her place in the Swiss Ski team at the end of the season.

== Retirement ==
In January 2011 she tore her collateral ligament during slalom training in Zuoz. In the beginning of May 2011, Wolf announced her retirement from professional skiing. The reasons provided for her retirement were the renewed injuries, the missed selection for the Swiss Ski squad for the 2011–12 season and professional priorities.
