= Paco Rassat =

French alpine skier (born 1998)

Personal information
- Born: 13 November 1998 (age 27) Chambéry, Savoie, France

Skiing career
- Country: France
- Sport: Alpine skiing
- Club: Les Aillons Ski Club
- Disciplines: Slalom
- World Cup debut: 9 January 2022 (age 23)

Olympics
- Teams: 1 – (2026)
- Medals: 0

World Championships
- Teams: 1 – (2025)
- Medals: 0

World Cup
- Seasons: 4 – (2022–2026)
- Wins: 2 – (2 SL)
- Podiums: 3 – (3 SL)
- Overall titles: 0 – (17th in 2026)
- Discipline titles: 0 – (7th in SL, 2026)
Medal record
Men's alpine skiing
Representing France
World Cup race podiums
Event	1st	2nd	3rd
Slalom	2	0	1
Total	2	0	1

Paco Rassat (born 13 November 1998) is a French World Cup alpine ski racer who specializes in the slalom discipline. His World Cup debut was in January 2022 and he earned his first victory (and podium) in Gurgl, Austria on 22 November 2025.

== Career ==
Rassat was born on 13 November 1998 in Chambéry, France. His father, Yann Rassat, is a ski instructor at the Les Aillons ski club who coached his son from age five. His mother worked as a ski patroller. Rassat earned a bronze medal in slalom at the 2019 Winter Universiade. He debuted at the FIS World Cup in 2022, achieving his first top 10 finish on 19 January 2025 in Wengen, Switzerland.

To start the 2025–26 World Cup season, Rassat finished sixth in Levi, Finland, his best career result to date. The following race in Gurgl, Rassat took first place after a strong second run, 0.07 seconds ahead of Armand Marchant. NBC Sports's Macklin Stern called it a "potentially star-making performance." He also took the lead in the overall World Cup season standings. Both his parents were in attendance for his first win. Rassat achieved his second podium in Madonna di Campiglio, Italy on 7 January 2026, jumping from 16th to 3rd after a strong second run.

== World Cup results ==
=== Season standings ===
Season
Season	Age	Overall	Slalom	Giant slalom	Super-G	Downhill
2024	26	103	37	—	—	—
2025	27	64	23	—	—	—
2026	28	17	7	—	—	—

=== Race podiums ===
- 2 wins – (2 SL)
- 3 podiums – (3 SL), 7 top tens

Season
Season	Date	Location	Discipline	Place
2026	22 November 2025	Gurgl, Austria	Slalom	1st
2026	7 January 2026	Madonna di Campiglio, Italy	Slalom	3rd
2026	11 January 2026	Adelboden, Switzerland	Slalom	1st

== World Championship results ==
Year
Year	Age	Slalom	Giant slalom	Super-G	Downhill	Combined	Team combined	Parallel	Team event
2025	27	DNF1	—	—	—	—	14	—	—

== Olympic results ==
Year
Year	Age	Slalom	Giant slalom	Super-G	Downhill	Team combined
2026	28	DNF1	—	—	—	15
