= Luca Vidi =

Swiss alpine skier

Personal information
- Born: 7 July 1976 (age 50) St. Gallen, Switzerland

Sport
- Sport: Skiing

Luca Vidi (born 7 July 1976 in St. Gallen, Switzerland) is a Swiss former alpine ski racer who competed in slalom, giant slalom, downhill, and super-G. After retiring from the sport in 2001 due to injury, Vidi is now primarily an entrepreneur.

== Career in sports ==
Starting with his first official competition under registry of the International Ski Federation in 1994 in Zermatt, Switzerland, Vidi competed until 2001, mainly in Switzerland, Austria and Italy - less frequently in France, Spain, Liechtenstein, Norway and South Korea. Notable performances include a 15th place in Super G at the European Cup in Altenmarkt-Zauchensee, Austria, in 1996 as well as first and second place in Downhill and Super G respectively at the Universiade in Muju, South Korea, in 1997. Vidi's equipment of choice included bindings by Atomic and boots by Lange.

== Career from 2001 ==
Vidi retired from active sports in 2001 due to ever more frequent injuries and concentrated on studying business economics at University of St. Gallen. Still a student, he co-founded a subsidiary online-translation company in 2002 of which he remains CEO to this day.

== Other notable activities ==
Vidi counts among the supporters of the NGO CCI (Centro de Convivência Infantil), who entertains a day school for children in Mogi-Mirim, Brazil.
