= Miran Rauter =

Slovenian alpine skier (born 1972)

Miran Rauter (born 14 February 1972 in Velenje) is a former Slovenian former alpine skier who competed in the 1994 Winter Olympics. In 2002, he took over his father's company Hermi producing lightning protection.
