= Urška Rabič =

Slovenian alpine skier (born 1985)

Urška Rabič (born 20 March 1985 in Mojstrana) is a former Slovenian alpine skier who competed in the 2006 Winter Olympics. She is currently Director of Skiing at Catamount Ski Resort's Alpine Racing Team. The team is part of the Tri-State Alpine Ski Racing Association.
