= Nicolas Raffort =

French alpine skier (born 1991)

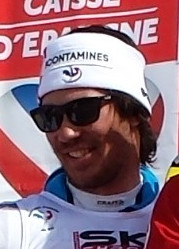
- Raffort in 2014

Personal information
- Born: 27 June 1991 (age 35) Sallanches, France

Skiing career
- Sport: Alpine skiing
- Club: S.C. Les Contamines-Montjoie
- Retired: 11 May 2022 (age 30)
- Disciplines: Downhill, Super-G
- World Cup debut: 23 February 2013 (age 21)

Nicolas Raffort (born 27 June 1991 in Sallanches) is a French former World Cup alpine ski racer who specialized in the speed events of downhill and super-G. He now represents France on the FIS Freestyle Ski Cross world cup, where he has one podium in Innichen, Italy.

== Biography ==
On 25 January 2019, he finished 14th in the Kitzbühel World Cup downhill on the Streif 4 track, which is his best result in the World Cup to date. He is engaged to Italian skier Federica Brignone.
