= Petra Robnik =

Slovenian alpine skier (born 1984)

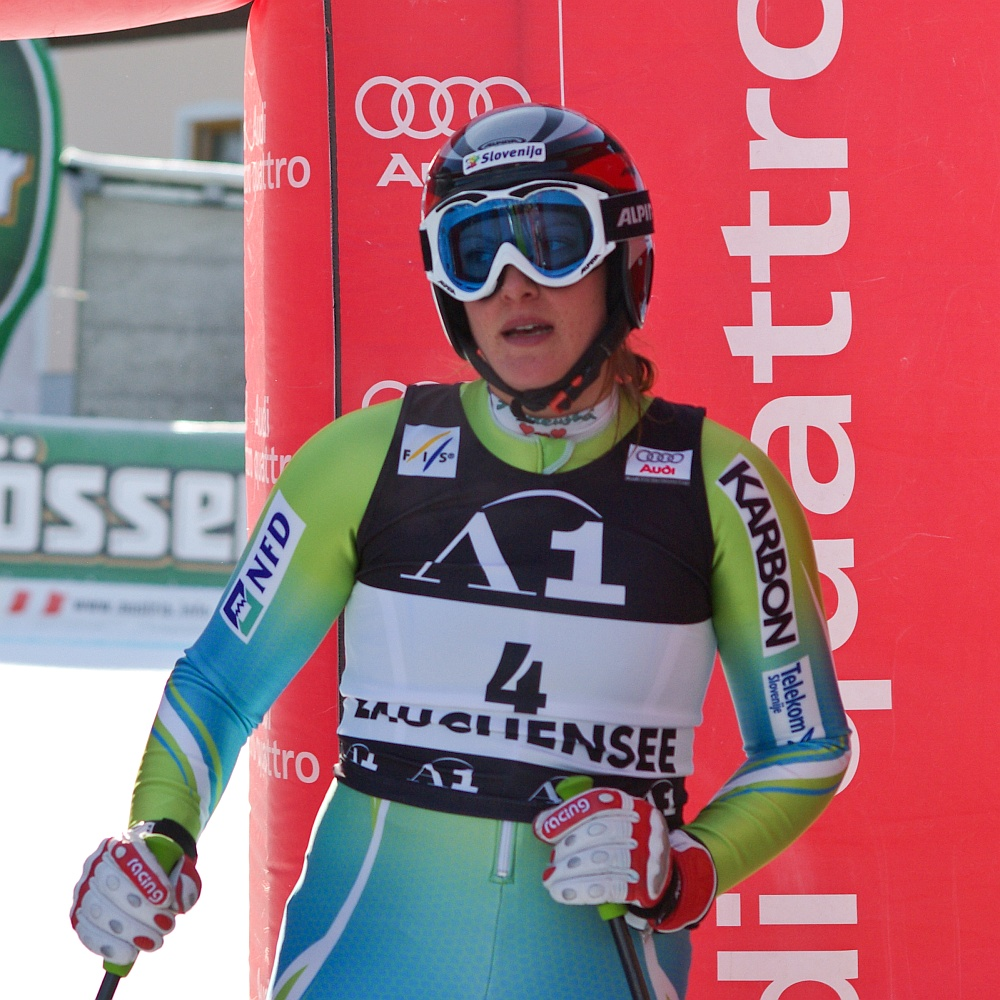
Robnik in 2009

Petra Robnik (born 16 October 1984 in Blejska Dobrava, Jesenice, SR Slovenia, SFR Yugoslavia) is a Slovenian alpine skier.

A member of SK Jesenice, she competes in all disciplines.

Robnik represented Slovenia at the 2006 Winter Olympics. She was placed 25th in the downhill, 21st in the combined and 29th in the Super-G.

Her World Cup was debut in 2004 in slalom in Maribor. So far, her best result is 8th place in Super-combined (Tarvisio, 2007).

Her best result in European cup is 8th place in slalom (Lenggries, 2008).

== Results in the Slovenian national championship ==
Date	Location	Race	Position
21 March 2006	(Slovenia) Kope	Downhill	1 place
4 April 2006	(Slovenia) Maribor	Slalom	1 place
20 March 2008	(Slovenia) Kope	Downhill (JR)	1 place
