= Giulia Gianesini =

Italian alpine skier (born 1984)

Giulia Gianesini (born 1984) is an Italian alpine skier.

She made her World Cup debut in December 2004 in Semmering. Failing to finish the race, this also happened on the next eleven occasions until managing a finish, 45th place, in December 2006 in Reiteralm. Collecting her first World Cup points in January 2008 in Ofterschwang, she improved to a 14th place in December 2008 in La Molina. In the 2010–2011 season she finished consistently among the top 20, reaching as high as number 9 in the January 2010 Cortina d'Ampezzo giant slalom. Her last World Cup outing came in October 2013 in Sölden.

She represented the sports club G.S. Fiamme Oro.
