= FIS Alpine World Ski Championships 2013 – Nations team event =

Nations team event at the FIS Alpine World Ski Championships 2013
- Venue: Planai; Schladming, Austria
- Date: 12 February 2013
- Teams: 15

Medalists
gold medal	Nicole Hosp; Michaela Kirchgasser; Carmen Thalmann; Marcel Hirscher; Marcel Mathis; Philipp Schörghofer	Austria
silver medal	Nathalie Eklund; Frida Hansdotter; Maria Pietilä Holmner; Jens Byggmark; Mattias Hargin; André Myhrer	Sweden
bronze medal	Lena Dürr; Maria Höfl-Riesch; Veronique Hronek; Fritz Dopfer; Stefan Luitz; Felix Neureuther	Germany

The nations team event competition at the 2013 World Championships was held on 12 February at 17:00 local time, the seventh race of the championships. Athletes from the best 16 nations in the FIS Overall Nations Cup ranking competed.

== Rules ==
The 16 best nations in the FIS Overall Nations Cup Ranking were eligible to participate in this event. Each team consisted of 4 to 6 skiers, but at least two female and two male skiers.

The format was a knock-out round competition with the pairings being made according to the Nations Cup Ranking. In each pairing, two female and two male skiers from each team raced a parallel slalom in a best-of-4 system. In the event of a tie, the faster cumulated time of the best male and the best female skier decides which team advanced to the next round.

== FIS Overall Nations Cup standings ==
The standings prior to the World Championships:

Rank	Country	Points
1	Austria	7856
2	Italy	4208
3	United States	4084
4	France	3697
5	Germany	3472
6	Sweden	2568
7	Switzerland	2455
8	Slovenia	2093
9	Norway	1908
10	Canada	1344
11	Finland	737
12	Croatia	705
13	Slovakia	508
14	Liechtenstein	171
15	Spain	164
16	Czech Republic	148
17	Japan	112
18	Russia	87
19	Netherlands	32
20	Poland	29
21	Great Britain	16
22	Hungary	8

Spain was eligible to participate, but decided not to. Therefore, top seeded Austria started with a bye in the round of 16 (1/8 finals).

== Participating teams ==
Every nation consists of 4 to 6 athletes.

Country	Skiers
Austria	Nicole Hosp
Austria	Michaela Kirchgasser
Austria	Carmen Thalmann
Austria	Marcel Hirscher
Austria	Marcel Mathis
Austria	Philipp Schörghofer
Italy	Chiara Costazza
Italy	Elena Curtoni
Italy	Denise Karbon
Italy	Matteo Marsaglia
Italy	Roberto Nani
Italy	Davide Simoncelli
United States	Stacey Cook
United States	Laurenne Ross
United States	Mikaela Shiffrin
United States	Will Brandenburg
United States	David Chodounsky
United States	Tim Jitloff
France	Anne-Sophie Barthet
France	Anémone Marmottan
France	Tessa Worley
France	Thomas Mermillod-Blondin
France	Steve Missillier
France	Steven Theolier
Germany	Lena Dürr
Germany	Maria Höfl-Riesch
Germany	Veronique Hronek
Germany	Fritz Dopfer
Germany	Stefan Luitz
Germany	Felix Neureuther
Sweden	Nathalie Eklund
Sweden	Frida Hansdotter
Sweden	Maria Pietilä Holmner
Sweden	Jens Byggmark
Sweden	Mattias Hargin
Sweden	André Myhrer
Switzerland	Michelle Gisin
Switzerland	Wendy Holdener
Switzerland	Rahel Kopp
Switzerland	Gino Caviezel
Switzerland	Reto Schmidiger
Switzerland	Markus Vogel
Slovenia	Ana Bucik
Slovenia	Ana Drev
Slovenia	Ilka Štuhec
Slovenia	Zan Kranjec
Slovenia	Miha Kuerner
Slovenia	Misel Zerak

Country	Skiers
Norway	Mona Løseth
Norway	Nina Løseth
Norway	Leif Kristian Haugen
Norway	Henrik Kristoffersen
Canada	Marie-Michèle Gagnon
Canada	Erin Mielzynski
Canada	Brittany Phelan
Canada	Elli Terwiel
Canada	Philip Brown
Canada	Michael Janyk
Finland	Nina Halme
Finland	Tanja Poutiainen
Finland	Merle Soppela
Finland	Victor Malmström
Finland	Eemeli Pirinen
Finland	Marcus Sandell
Croatia	Andrea Komšić
Croatia	Sofija Novoselić
Croatia	Sasa Tršinski
Croatia	Ivica Kostelić
Croatia	Dalibor Šamšal
Croatia	Filip Zubčić
Slovakia	Veronika Zuzulová
Slovakia	Petra Vlhová
Slovakia	Matej Falat
Slovakia	Adam Žampa
Slovakia	Andreas Žampa
Liechtenstein	Anna-Laura Bühler
Liechtenstein	Joana Frick
Liechtenstein	Marina Nigg
Liechtenstein	Nico Gauer
Liechtenstein	Simon Heeb
Liechtenstein	Marco Pfiffner
Czech Republic	Martina Dubovská
Czech Republic	Katerina Paulathová
Czech Republic	Valentina Volopichová
Czech Republic	Ondřej Bank
Czech Republic	Ondřej Berndt
Czech Republic	Filip Trejbal

== Results bracket ==
After the withdrawal of Spain and with only 15 nations remaining, top-seed Austria received a bye to second round.

Round of 16
8	Slovenia	2
9	Norway	2
5	Germany	3
12	Croatia	1
4	France	4
13	Slovakia	0
6	Sweden	3
11	Finland	1
3	United States	3
14	Liechtenstein	2
7	Switzerland	1
10	Canada	3
15	Czech Republic	3
2	Italy	1

Quarterfinals
1	Austria	3
8	Slovenia	1
5	Germany	2
4	France	2
6	Sweden	3
3	United States	1
10	Canada	2
15	Czech Republic	2

Semifinals
1	Austria	4
5	Germany	0
6	Sweden	3
10	Canada	1

Final
1	Austria	4
6	Sweden	0
Third place
5	Germany	2
10	Canada	2

== Results ==
=== 1/8 final ===
Team 1	Score	Team 2
Slovenia	2–2	Norway
Drev 20.87	2–2	M. Løseth 20.40
Kranjec 19.56	2–2	Kristoffersen 19.96
Bucik 20.40	2–2	N. Løseth 20.86
Kuerner 20.02	2–2	Haugen 19.62
Germany	3–1	Croatia
Dürr 20.84	3–1	Novoselić 20.83
Dopfer 19.28	3–1	Šamšal 20.52
Höfl-Riesch 20.57	3–1	Tršinski 22.26
Neureuther	3–1	Zubčić DQ
France	4–0	Slovakia
Worley 20.02	4–0	Zuzulová 20.08
Mermillod-Blondin 19.80	4–0	Falat 20.44
Marmottan 20.37	4–0	Vlhová 20.89
Missillier 19.42	4–0	Adam Zampa 19.66

Team 1	Score	Team 2
Sweden	3–1	Finland
Hansdotter 20.41	3–1	Poutiainen 20.18
Hargin 19.45	3–1	Sandell 20.01
Pietilä-Holmner 20.42	3–1	Soppela 21.06
Myhrer 19.39	3–1	Pirinen 20.08
United States	3–2	Liechtenstein
Cook 24.46	3–2	Nigg 21.80
Jitloff 20.39	3–2	Heeb 20.39
Ross 21.84	3–2	Bühler DNF
Chodounsky 19.76	3–2	Pfiffner 20.14
Switzerland	1–3	Canada
Holdener 20.63	1–3	Gagnon 21.03
Vogel 24.10	1–3	Janyk 19.73
Kopp 20.54	1–3	Mielzynski 20.31
Caviezel 19.87	1–3	Brown 19.72
Czech Republic	3–1	Italy
Paulathova 20.94	3–1	Costazza 21.04
Berndt 20.26	3–1	Simoncelli 20.31
Dubovska 21.42	3–1	Curtoni 21.06
Trejbal 20.19	3–1	Nani 21.03

=== Quarterfinals ===
Team 1	Score	Team 2
Austria	3–1	Slovenia
Thalmann 21.81	3–1	Drev 20.75
Hirscher 19.08	3–1	Kranjec DNF
Kirchgasser 20.68	3–1	Bucik 21.20
Schörghofer 20.04	3–1	Zerak 22.27
Germany	2–2	France
Dürr 20.51	2–2	Marmottan 20.48
Neureuther 19.47	2–2	Mermillod-Blondin DNF
Höfl-Riesch 21.01	2–2	Worley 20.53
Dopfer 19.35	2–2	Missillier 19.42

Team 1	Score	Team 2
Sweden	3–1	United States
Pietilä-Holmner 20.61	3–1	Ross 21.64
Hargin 19.71	3–1	Chodounsky 19.55
Hansdotter 20.65	3–1	Cook 21.61
Myhrer 19.44	3–1	Jitloff 20.14
Canada	2–2	Czech Republic
Mielzynski 20.49	2–2	Paulathova 20.69
Brown 19.98	2–2	Berndt DNF
Gagnon 21.18	2–2	Dubovska 20.69
Janyk 20.02	2–2	Trejbal 19.95

=== Semifinals ===
Team 1	Score	Team 2
Austria	4–0	Germany
Hosp 21.13	4–0	Dürr DNF
Hirscher 18.90	4–0	Dopfer 19.35
Kirchgasser 20.73	4–0	Höfl-Riesch DNF
Schörghofer 19.23	4–0	Neureuther 19.54

Team 1	Score	Team 2
Sweden	3–1	Canada
Hansdotter 20.70	3–1	Phelan 21.83
Hargin 19.54	3–1	Janyk 19.44
Pietilä-Holmner 20.30	3–1	Mielzynski 20.50
Myhrer 19.53	3–1	Brown 21.62

=== Bronze medal races ===
Team 1	Score	Team 2
Germany	2–2	Canada
Dürr 20.70	2–2	Phelan 21.21
Neureuther 19.28	2–2	Janyk 19.21
Höfl-Riesch 20.73	2–2	Mielzynski 20.72
Dopfer 19.18	2–2	Brown 19.19

=== Gold medal races ===
Team 1	Score	Team 2
Austria	4–0	Sweden
Hosp 20.95	4–0	Pietilä-Holmner 22.29
Hirscher 19.08	4–0	Hargin 19.52
Kirchgasser 20.32	4–0	Hansdotter 20.72
Schörghofer	4–0	Myhrer DQ
