= Uroš Pavlovčič =

Slovenian alpine skier (born 1972)

Uroš Pavlovčič (born 20 February 1972 in Jesenice) is a Slovenian former alpine skier who competed in the 2002 Winter Olympics.

== World Cup results ==
=== Season standings ===
Season	Age	Overall	Slalom	Giant slalom	Super-G	Downhill	Combined
2000	27	80	40	46	—	—	—
2001	28	56	27	36	—	—	—
2002	29	57	—	18	—	—	—
2003	30	64	—	22	—	—	—

=== Race podiums ===
Season	Date	Location	Discipline	Position
2002	20 December 2001	Kranjska Gora, Slovenia	Giant slalom	3rd
