= Brigitte Acton =

Canadian alpine skier (born 1985)

Personal information
- Born: November 30, 1985 (age 40) Sault Ste. Marie, Ontario, Canada

Skiing career
- Sport: Alpine skiing

Brigitte Acton (born November 30, 1985) is a Canadian alpine skier. Acton competed at the 2006 Winter Games, where she finished 11th in the giant slalom, 17th in the slalom, and 10th in the combined. She also competed at the 2010 Winter Games.

She finished first in Slalom in the 2006 Canadian National Championships, second in Giant Slalom and seventh in Super G.

== Personal life ==
Acton's mother, Diane Pratte, competed in the 1972 Olympics in Sapporo, Japan. Acton's father, Gordon Acton was a member of the Canadian National Ski Team, as well as her sister Lise-Marie, uncles Raymond and Michel Pratte and aunt Claude Pratte.

On September 3, 2010, Acton married NHL goaltender Mike Smith. They have four children.
