= Filip Trejbal =

Czech alpine skier (born 1985)

Personal information
- Born: 5 January 1985 (age 41) Jilemnice, Czechoslovakia

Skiing career
- Sport: Alpine skiing
- Disciplines: Giant slalom
World Cup debut
9 January 2005 (age 20)

Olympics
- Teams: 3 (2006, 2010, 2014)
- Medals: 0

World Championships
- Teams: 5 – (2005–2013)
- Medals: 0

World Cup
- Seasons: 11 – (2005–15)
- Wins: 0
- Podiums: 0
- Overall titles: 0 – (96th in 2010)
- Discipline titles: 0 – (33rd in SL, 2010)

Filip Trejbal (born 5 January 1985) is a Czech alpine skier. He competed for the Czech Republic at the 2006 Winter Olympics and the 2010 Winter Olympics. His best result was a 28th place in the combined in 2010.

== World Cup results ==
=== Season standings ===
Season	Age	Overall	Slalom	Giant Slalom	Super G	Downhill	Combined
2006	21	125	58	—	—	—	48
2007	22	110	46	—	—	—	46
2008	23	104	43	—	—	—	52
2009	24	123	52	—	—	—	—
2010	25	96	34	—	—	—	—
2011	26	101	33	—	—	—	—
2012	27	113	42	—	—	—	—

=== Results per discipline ===
Discipline	WC starts	WC Top 30	WC Top 15	WC Top 5	WC Podium	Best result		
Discipline	WC starts	WC Top 30	WC Top 15	WC Top 5	WC Podium	Date	Location	Place
Slalom	82	16	2	0	0	9 February 2008; 21 December 2009	Garmisch-Partenkirchen, Germany; Alta Badia, Italy	14th
Giant slalom	2	0	0	0	0	29 January 2010	Kranjska Gora, Slovenia	51st
Super-G	0	0	0	0	0			
Downhill	0	0	0	0	0			
Combined	11	3	0	0	0	30 November 2006	Beaver Creek, United States	25th
Total	95	19	2	0	0			

- standings through 20 Jan 2019

== World Championship results ==
Year
Year	Age	Slalom	Giant; Slalom	Super G	Downhill	Combined	Team Event
2005	20	17	29	—	—	—	—
2007	22	16	DNF1	47	DNS	24	—
2009	24	DQ1	—	—	—	—	—
2011	26	16	—	—	—	—	—
2013	28	29	—	—	—	—	—

== Olympic results ==
Year
Year	Age	Slalom	Giant; Slalom	Super G	Downhill	Combined
2006	21	DNF2	—	—	—	DNF1
2010	25	DNF1	39	—	57	28
2014	29	DNF2	—	—	—	—
