= Ana Kobal =

Slovenian alpine skier (born 1983)

Ana Kobal (born 11 November 1983 in Žirovnica) is a former Slovenian alpine skier. She competed in the 2006 Winter Olympics in Turin in Giant Slalom and Super-G. In Giant Slalom she was 9th and in Super-G 45th.
