= Sergey Komarov (skier) =

Russian alpine skier (born 1983)

Sergey Anatolyevich Komarov (Russian: Сергей Анатольевич Комаров; born 9 December 1983) is a former Russian alpine skier who competed in the 2002 Winter Olympics.

Senior coach of the Russian women's national team in alpine skiing.
