= FIS Alpine World Ski Championships 2013 – Men's giant slalom =

Men's giant slalom at the FIS Alpine World Ski Championships 2013
- Venue: Planai; Schladming, Austria
- Date: 15 February 2013
- Competitors: 99 from 55 nations
- Winning time: 2:28.92

Medalists
gold medal	Ted Ligety	United States
silver medal	Marcel Hirscher	Austria
bronze medal	Manfred Mölgg	Italy

The Men's giant slalom competition at the 2013 World Championships ran on Friday, February 15 at 10:00 local time (1st run) and 13:30 (2nd run), the ninth race of the championships. 99 athletes from 55 countries competed in the main race while 132 athletes from 53 countries competed in the qualification race on Thursday, February 14.

Ted Ligety won his third gold medal of the 2013 World Championships, joined on the podium by Marcel Hirscher and Manfred Mölgg. Ligety became the fifth man in history to win three or more gold medals at one world championships and the first in 45 years, when Jean-Claude Killy won four in 1968. Ligety is the first racer of either gender to win the Super G, the giant slalom, and the combined at one world championships.

== Results ==
=== Race ===
The first run was held at 10:00 and the second run at 13:30.

Rank	Bib	Name	Nation	Run 1	Rank	Run 2	Rank	Total	Difference
1st place, gold medalist(s)	3	Ted Ligety	United States	1:13.14	1	1:15.78	6	2:28.92	
2nd place, silver medalist(s)	6	Marcel Hirscher	Austria	1:14.45	3	1:15.28	1	2:29.73	+0.81
3rd place, bronze medalist(s)	7	Manfred Mölgg	Italy	1:14.58	4	1:16.09	9	2:30.67	+1.75
4	1	Aksel Lund Svindal	Norway	1:14.44	2	1:16.27	13	2:30.71	+1.79
5	2	Alexis Pinturault	France	1:15.09	8	1:15.77	5	2:30.86	+1.94
6	8	Davide Simoncelli	Italy	1:14.91	6	1:16.09	9	2:31.00	+2.08
7	5	Fritz Dopfer	Germany	1:14.72	5	1:16.39	17	2:31.11	+2.19
8	11	Philipp Schörghofer	Austria	1:15.45	11	1:15.72	4	2:31.17	+2.25
9	15	Benjamin Raich	Austria	1:15.04	7	1:16.28	15	2:31.32	+2.40
10	13	Felix Neureuther	Germany	1:16.30	14	1:15.40	2	2:31.70	+2.78
11	4	Massimiliano Blardone	Italy	1:15.47	12	1:16.27	13	2:31.74	+2.82
12	10	Marcus Sandell	Finland	1:15.42	10	1:16.56	20	2:31.98	+3.06
13	14	Marcel Mathis	Austria	1:15.13	9	1:17.04	23	2:32.17	+3.25
14	16	André Myhrer	Sweden	1:16.93	17	1:15.54	3	2:32.47	+3.55
15	27	Gino Caviezel	Switzerland	1:16.99	18	1:15.96	8	2:32.95	+4.03
16	24	Tim Jitloff	United States	1:17.17	21	1:15.91	7	2:33.08	+4.16
17	26	Adam Žampa	Slovakia	1:17.07	19	1:16.20	12	2:33.27	+4.35
18	19	Matts Olsson	Sweden	1:15.51	13	1:17.82	28	2:33.33	+4.41
19	17	Cyprien Richard	France	1:16.71	15	1:16.83	22	2:33.54	+4.62
20	36	Henrik Kristoffersen	Norway	1:17.67	25	1:16.14	11	2:33.81	+4.89
21	23	Mathieu Faivre	France	1:16.78	16	1:17.07	24	2:33.85	+4.93
22	39	Žan Kranjec	Slovenia	1:17.54	23	1:16.43	18	2:33.97	+5.05
23	25	Roberto Nani	Italy	1:17.44	22	1:16.59	21	2:34.03	+5.11
24	21	Leif Kristian Haugen	Norway	1:18.11	28	1:16.31	16	2:34.42	+5.50
25	9	Ivica Kostelić	Croatia	1:17.61	24	1:17.11	25	2:34.72	+5.80
26	34	Robby Kelley	United States	1:18.44	29	1:16.47	19	2:34.91	+5.99
27	38	Pavel Trikhichev	Russia	1:17.70	26	1:17.68	27	2:35.38	+6.46
28	50	Filip Zubčić	Croatia	1:18.78	30	1:17.64	26	2:36.42	+7.50
29	52	Tomoya Ishi	Japan	1:19.10	32	1:18.75	31	2:37.85	+8.93
30	42	Eemeli Pirinen	Finland	1:19.44	33	1:18.45	30	2:37.89	+8.97
31	44	Klemen Kosi	Slovenia	1:19.85	36	1:18.18	29	2:38.03	+9.11
32	37	Samu Torsti	Finland	1:19.09	31	1:19.22	34	2:38.31	+9.39
33	47	Aleksander Andrienko	Russia	1:20.05	37	1:19.09	32	2:39.14	+10.22
34	53	Nikola Chongarov	Bulgaria	1:20.09	38	1:19.19	33	2:39.28	+10.36
35	35	Philip Brown	Canada	1:19.75	35	1:20.09	37	2:39.84	+10.92
36	51	Ryunosuke Ohkoshi	Japan	1:20.41	40	1:19.76	36	2:40.17	+11.25
37	43	Maarten Meiners	Netherlands	1:21.21	43	1:19.39	35	2:40.60	+11.68
38	62	Kristaps Zvejnieks	Latvia	1:20.82	41	1:20.12	38	2:40.94	+12.02
39	58	Joan Verdú Sánchez	Andorra	1:21.06	42	1:20.27	39	2:41.33	+12.41
40	54	Roger Vidosa	Andorra	1:21.77	45	1:20.29	40	2:42.06	+13.14
41	48	Cristian Javier Simari Birkner	Argentina	1:21.88	46	1:20.78	41	2:42.66	+13.74
42	46	Luke Laidlaw	Australia	1:19.51	34	1:24.11	46	2:43.62	+14.70
43	80	Yuri Danilochkin	Belarus	1:22.49	49	1:21.97	42	2:44.46	+15.54
44	56	Olivier Jenot	Monaco	1:21.28	44	1:23.73	45	2:45.01	+16.09
45	73	Mike Rishworth	Australia	1:23.07	50	1:22.49	43	2:45.56	+16.64
46	72	Eugenio Claro	Chile	1:21.95	47	1:25.03	50	2:46.98	+18.06
47	85	Norbert Farkas	Hungary	1:24.58	53	1:22.96	44	2:47.54	+18.62
48	59	Mohammad Kiadarbandsari	Iran	1:24.49	52	1:24.46	47	2:48.95	+20.03
49	75	Antonio Ristevski	Macedonia	1:24.41	51	1:24.84	48	2:49.25	+20.33
50	81	Massimiliano Valcareggi	Greece	1:25.61	56	1:24.97	49	2:50.58	+21.66
51	76	Christoffer Faarup	Denmark	1:25.21	55	1:25.84	51	2:51.05	+22.13
52	98	Conor Lyne	Ireland	1:24.75	54	1:26.41	52	2:51.16	+22.24
53	79	Alexandru Barbu	Romania	1:25.75	57	1:26.67	54	2:52.42	+23.50
54	82	Erjon Tola	Albania	1:27.66	59	1:26.66	53	2:54.32	+25.40
55	86	Einar-Kristinn Kristgeirsson	Iceland	1:26.73	58	1:28.13	55	2:54.86	+25.94
56	91	Vasyl Telychuk	Ukraine	1:28.94	60	1:31.48	56	3:00.42	+31.50
	18	Didier Defago	Switzerland	1:17.13	20	DNF			
	30	Dustin Cook	Canada	1:20.19	39	DNF			
	77	Iason Abramashvili	Georgia	1:22.47	48	DNF			
	22	Carlo Janka	Switzerland	1:17.78	27	DNS			
61	99	Alexandre Mohbat	Lebanon	1:29.09	61				
62	89	Marko Rudić	Bosnia and Herzegovina	1:29.29	62				
63	87	Park Hy-Un	South Korea	1:29.34	63				
64	97	Constantinos Papamichael	Cyprus	1:30.51	64				
65	92	Sam Greefs	Belgium	1:31.07	65				
66	93	Kim Yngland	Luxembourg	1:31.34	66				
67	96	Mladen Minić	Montenegro	1:32.04	67				
68	94	Dmitriy Babikov	Uzbekistan	1:35.18	68				
69	88	Virgile Vandeput	Israel	1:38.16	69				
70	90	Arsen Nersisyan	Armenia	1:38.55	70				
	12	Thomas Fanara	France	DNF					
	28	Marc Berthod	Switzerland	DNF					
	29	Janez Jazbec	Slovenia	DNF					
	32	Victor Malmström	Finland	DNF					
	33	Stepan Zuev	Russia	DNF					
	40	Thomas Biesemeyer	United States	DNF					
	41	Mirko Delflorian	Moldova	DNF					
	45	Misel Zerak	Slovenia	DNF					
	49	Benjamin Griffin	New Zealand	DNF					
	55	Simon Heeb	Liechtenstein	DNF					
	57	Sebastiano Gastaldi	Argentina	DNF					
	61	Warren Cummings Smith	Estonia	DNF					
	63	Adam Barwood	New Zealand	DNF					
	64	Steffan Winkelhorst	Netherlands	DNF					
	65	Andreas Zampa	Slovakia	DNF					
	66	Marc Oliveras	Andorra	DNF					
	67	Jorge Birkner Ketelhohn	Argentina	DNF					
	68	Leo Vukelić	Croatia	DNF					
	69	Stefan Prisadov	Bulgaria	DNF					
	70	Marko Vukićević	Serbia	DNF					
	71	Jaba Gelashvili	Georgia	DNF					
	74	Matej Falat	Slovakia	DNF					
	78	Patrick Brachner	Azerbaijan	DNF					
	84	Zhang Yuxin	China	DNF					
	95	Manfred Oettl Reyes	Peru	DNF					
	20	Stefan Luitz	Germany	DQ					
	83	Jhonatan Longhi	Brazil	DQ					
	31	Ondřej Bank	Czech Republic	DNS					
	60	Martin Vráblík	Czech Republic	DNS					

=== Qualification ===
Qualified for the actual race were the top 25 runners + one runner each from the best 25 non-represented nations amongst the qualifiers. The first run started at 10:00 and the second run at 13:30.

Rank	Bib	Name	Nation	Run 1	Rank	Run 2	Rank	Total	Difference
1	4	Tomoya Ishii	Japan	1:09.62	1	1:14.27	3	2:23.89	
2	17	Kristaps Zvejnieks	Latvia	1:09.97	2	1:14.17	2	2:24.14	+0.25
3	6	Nikola Chongarov	Bulgaria	1:10.78	4	1:14.70	7	2:25.48	+1.59
4	14	Sebastiano Gastaldi	Argentina	1:10.02	3	1:15.66	17	2:25.68	+1.79
5	21	Andreas Zampa	Slovakia	1:11.30	9	1:14.61	6	2:25.91	+2.02
6	2	Ryunosuke Ohkoshi	Japan	1:11.75	12	1:14.58	5	2:26.33	+2.44
7	5	Simon Heeb	Liechtenstein	1:11.27	8	1:15.11	9	2:26.38	+2.49
8	10	Joan Verdú Sánchez	Andorra	1:10.80	5	1:15.64	16	2:26.44	+2.55
9	41	Iason Abramashvili	Georgia	1:12.13	16	1:14.54	4	2:26.67	+2.78
10	15	Maciej Bydliński	Poland	1:11.60	11	1:15.51	15	2:27.11	+3.22
11	1	Roger Vidosa	Andorra	1:11.13	7	1:16.08	21	2:27.21	+3.32
12	3	Olivier Jenot	Monaco	1:11.78	13	1:15.44	13	2:27.22	+3.33
13	19	Adam Barwood	New Zealand	1:12.06	14	1:15.26	11	2:27.32	+3.43
14	8	Martin Vráblík	Czech Republic	1:11.30	9	1:16.33	26	2:27.63	+3.74
15	35	Matej Falat	Slovakia	1:12.25	17	1:15.78	18	2:28.03	+4.14
16	28	Stefan Prisadov	Bulgaria	1:13.14	20	1:15.04	8	2:28.18	+4.29
17	32	Jaba Gelashvili	Georgia	1:12.42	19	1:15.87	19	2:28.29	+4.40
18	27	Leo Vukelić	Croatia	1:13.63	24	1:15.14	10	2:28.77	+4.88
19	33	Eugenio Claro	Chile	1:12.09	15	1:16.77	28	2:28.86	+4.97
20	45	Yuri Danilochkin	Belarus	1:13.58	23	1:15.37	12	2:28.95	+5.06
21	25	Marc Oliveras	Andorra	1:13.52	22	1:15.48	14	2:29.00	5.11
22	20	Steffan Winkelhorst	Netherlands	1:15.31	35	1:14.06	1	2:29.37	+5.48
23	26	Jorge Birkner Ketelhohn	Argentina	1:13.74	26	1:15.93	20	2:29.67	+5.78
24	34	Mike Rishworth	Australia	1:13.82	27	1:16.17	23	2:29.99	+6.10
25	9	Mohammad Kiadarbandsari	Iran	1:12.27	18	1:17.73	29	2:30.00	+6.11
26	24	Henrik von Appen	Chile	1:13.91	28	1:16.16	22	2:30.07	6.18
27	31	Rodrigo Murtagh	Argentina	1:13.92	29	1:16.39	27	2:30.31	+6.42
28	42	Patrick Brachner	Azerbaijan	1:14.28	30	1:16.26	24	2:30.54	+6.65
29	46	Elias Kolega	Croatia	1:14.98	33	1:16.30	25	2:31.28	+7.39
30	29	Willis Feasey	New Zealand	1:15.08	34	1:18.63	21	2:33.71	9.82
31	36	Marco Pfiffner	Liechtenstein	1:15.53	36	1:18.47	31	2:34.00	+10.11
32	43	Morteza Jafari	Iran	1:16.19	37	1:18.27	30	2:34.46	+10.57
33	44	Alexandru Barbu	Romania	1:16.39	39	1:19.23	34	2:35.62	+11.73
34	70	Marko Rudić	Bosnia and Herzegovina	1:16.76	40	1:18.94	33	2:35.70	+11.81
35	54	Norbert Farkas	Hungary	1:14.71	31	1:21.11	42	2:35.82	+11.93
36	80	Ivan Kovbasnyuk	Ukraine	1:17.45	43	1:20.16	36	2:37.61	+13.72
37	50	Erjon Tola	Albania	1:17.26	42	1:20.81	38	2:38.07	+14.18
38	73	Strahinja Stanišić	Serbia	1:18.26	48	1:19.94	35	2:38.20	+14.31
39	72	Ioannis Antoniou	Greece	1:18.05	47	1:20.66	37	2:38.71	+14.82
40	61	Brynjar-Jökull Gudmundsson	Iceland	1:17.69	45	1:21.11	42	2:38.80	+14.91
41	64	Arnar-Geir Isaksson	Iceland	1:18.66	50	1:20.89	40	2:39.55	+15.66
42	88	Conor Lyne	Ireland	1:18.73	52	1:20.84	39	2:39.57	+15.68
43	51	Jhonatan Longhi	Brazil	1:16.84	41	1:23.83	47	2:40.67	+16.78
44	91	Benjamin Szollos	Hungary	1:20.75	56	1:21.09	41	2:41.84	+17.95
45	60	Park Hy-Un	South Korea	1:20.37	54	1:22.41	44	2:42.78	+18.89
46	117	Alexander Heath	South Africa	1:21.13	58	1:22.83	45	2:43.96	+20.07
47	95	Evgeniy Timofeev	Kyrgyzstan	1:21.04	57	1:23.04	46	2:44.08	+20.19
48	97	Viacheslau Yudzin	Belarus	1:21.90	62	1:24.57	48	2:46.47	+22.58
49	90	Alexandre Mohbat	Lebanon	1:21.39	60	1:25.85	51	2:47.24	+23.35
50	76	Sam Greefs	Belgium	1:22.49	63	1:25.67	50	2:48.16	+24.27
51	100	Vincenzo Romano Michelotti	San Marino	1:25.24	70	1:25.42	49	2:50.66	+26.77
52	102	Aivaras Tumas	Lithuania	1:23.38	64	1:27.31	52	2:50.69	+26.80
53	79	Arsen Ghazaryan	Armenia	1:24.75	67	1:27.34	53	2:52.09	+28.20
54	106	Roberts Brishka	Latvia	1:25.34	71	1:27.45	54	2:52.79	+28.90
55	105	Dinos Lefkaritis	Cyprus	1:24.72	66	1:28.28	55	2:53.00	+29.11
56	103	Gilles Bock	Luxembourg	1:25.13	69	1:30.09	57	2:55.22	+31.33
57	104	Karolis Janulionis	Lithuania	1:27.46	73	1:29.65	56	2:57.11	+33.22
58	96	Tarek Fenianos	Lebanon	1:28.83	74	1:30.98	58	2:59.81	+35.92
59	115	Sive Speelman	South Africa	1:29.09	75	1:32.62	60	3:01.71	+37.82
60	81	Dmitriy Babikov	Uzbekistan	1:31.41	77	1:32.23	59	3:03.64	+39.75
61	112	Arif Khan	India	1:33.45	79	1:35.87	61	3:09.32	+45.43
62	94	Dani Chamoun	Lebanon	1:32.47	78	1:38.03	62	3:10.50	+46.61
63	113	Tsotane Dywili	South Africa	1:34.29	80	1:41.11	63	3:15.40	+51.51
64	128	Jean-Pierre Roy	Haiti	1:47.22	82	1:52.60	64	3:39.82	+1:15.93
65	129	Wu Meng-che	Chinese Taipei	1:52.02	84	1:58.19	65	3:50.21	+1:26.32
66	130	Michael Elliott Williams	Jamaica	1:58.19	85	2:11.63	66	4:09.82	+1:45.93
	7	Kevin Esteve	Andorra	1:11.03	6	DNF			
	12	Nick Prebble	New Zealand	1:13.36	21	DNF			
	13	Ondřej Berndt	Czech Republic	1:14.79	32	DNF			
	49	Hossein Saveh-Shemshaki	Iran	1:17.56	44	DNF			
	55	Einar-Kristinn Kristgeirsson	Iceland	1:18.72	51	DNF			
	58	Miks Zvejnieks	Latvia	1:16.22	38	DNF			
	63	Kostas Sykaras	Greece	1:18.01	46	DNF			
	66	Marko Stevović	Serbia	1:18.43	49	DNF			
	75	Vasyl Telychuk	Ukraine	1:21.36	59	DNF			
	84	Mladen Minić	Montenegro	1:19.61	53	DNF			
	85	Tarik Hadžić	Montenegro	1:20.63	55	DNF			
	86	Balázs Hegyi	Hungary	1:24.91	68	DNF			
	87	Constantinos Papamichael	Cyprus	1:23.98	65	DNF			
	89	Zoltán Halmágyi	Hungary	1:21.59	61	DNF			
	107	Sergei Trelevskii	Kyrgyzstan	1:26.88	72	DNF			
	110	Lorenzo Bizzocchi	San Marino	1:30.24	76	DNF			
	114	Davit Khachatryan	Armenia	1:50.66	83	DNF			
	132	Benoit Etoc	Haiti	2:01.99	86	DNF			
	52	Manuel Hug	Liechtenstein	1:13.64	25	DQ			
	123	Gentian Kurtesi	Macedonia	1:37.14	81	DNS			
	11	Pouria Saveh-Shemshaki	Iran	DNF					
	16	Warren Cummings Smith	Estonia	DNF					
	18	Alex Beniaidze	Georgia	DNF					
	22	José Tomás Echeverria	Chile	DNF					
	30	Marko Vukićević	Serbia	DNF					
	37	Antonio Ristevski	Macedonia	DNF					
	38	Christoffer Faarup	Denmark	DNF					
	39	Ross Peraudo	Australia	DNF					
	40	Sebastian Pfingsthorn	Chile	DNF					
	47	Dardan Dehari	Macedonia	DNF					
	48	Massimiliano Valcareggi	Greece	DNF					
	53	Zhang Yuxin	China	DNF					
	57	Huang Haibin	China	DNF					
	62	Andrija Vuković	Serbia	DNF					
	65	Nico Gauer	Liechtenstein	DNF					
	68	Soso Japharidze	Georgia	DNF					
	69	Virgile Vandeput	Israel	DNF					
	71	Fabio Guglielmini	Brazil	DNF					
	74	Arsen Nersisyan	Armenia	DNF					
	78	Haris Hodžić	Bosnia and Herzegovina	DNF					
	77	Kim Yngland	Luxembourg	DNF					
	82	Manfred Oettl Reyes	Peru	DNF					
	83	Geoffrey Osch	Luxembourg	DNF					
	92	Artem Voronov	Uzbekistan	DNF					
	93	Dmitriy Trelevski	Kyrgyzstan	DNF					
	98	Arkadiy Semenchenko	Uzbekistan	DNF					
	99	Oskar Emil Vedsted-Jacobsen	Denmark	DNF					
	101	Hubert Gallagher	Ireland	DNF					
	108	Michael Chaker	Lebanon	DNF					
	109	Kasper Jacobsen Astorp	Denmark	DNF					
	111	Ģirts Zile	Latvia	DNF					
	118	Konstantin Shchennikov	Uzbekistan	DNF					
	119	Igor Borisov	Kyrgyzstan	DNF					
	120	Himanshu Thakur	India	DNF					
	121	Besar Iljazi	Macedonia	DNF					
	124	Sunny Kumar	India	DNF					
	127	Malik Holm	Denmark	DNF					
	125	Hubertus von Hohenlohe	Mexico	DQ					
	23	Michal Klusak	Poland	DNS					
	56	Li Lei	China	DNS					
	59	Rostyslav Feshchuk	Ukraine	DNS					
	67	Kerim Sabljica	Bosnia and Herzegovina	DNS					
	116	Yura Manukyan	Armenia	DNS					
	122	Ricardo Brancal	Portugal	DNS					
	126	Joao-Miguel Marques	Portugal	DNS					
	131	Simonas Masalskas	Lithuania	DNS					
