= Alpine skiing at the 2014 Winter Olympics – Men's giant slalom =

Men's giant slalom at the XXII Olympic Winter Games
- Alpine skiing pictogram
- Venue: Rosa Khutor Alpine Resort
- Date: 19 February 2014
- Competitors: 109 from 62 nations
- Winning time: 2:45.29

Medalists
1st place, gold medalist(s)		Ted Ligety	United States
2nd place, silver medalist(s)		Steve Missillier	France
3rd place, bronze medalist(s)		Alexis Pinturault	France

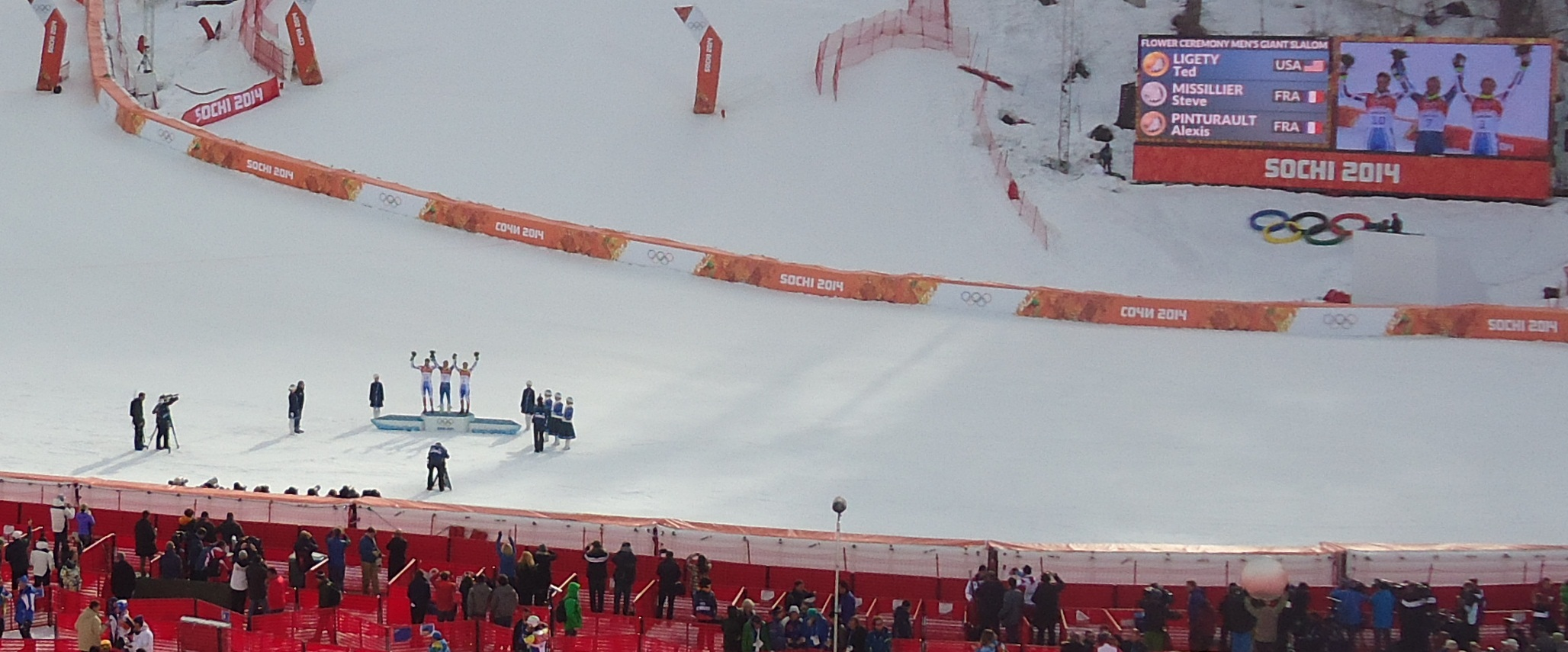
The Flower ceremony after the race at Rosa Khutor

The men's giant slalom competition of the Sochi 2014 Olympics was held at the Rosa Khutor Alpine Resort near Krasnaya Polyana, Russia, on 19 February.

== Results ==
The first run was started at 11:00 and the second run at 14:30.

Rank	Bib	Name	Nation	Run 1	Rank	Run 2	Rank	Total	Behind
1st place, gold medalist(s)	7	Ted Ligety	United States	1:21.08	1	1:24.21	14	2:45.29	—
2nd place, silver medalist(s)	10	Steve Missillier	France	1:22.58	10	1:23.19	1	2:45.77	+0.48
3rd place, bronze medalist(s)	1	Alexis Pinturault	France	1:22.44	6	1:23.49	2	2:45.93	+0.64
4	3	Marcel Hirscher	Austria	1:22.47	7	1:23.76	5	2:46.23	+0.94
5	28	Ondřej Bank	Czech Republic	1:22.01	2	1:24.28	15	2:46.29	+1.00
6	18	Matthias Mayer	Austria	1:22.41	4	1:23.93	9	2:46.34	+1.05
7	8	Benjamin Raich	Austria	1:22.67	13	1:23.68	4	2:46.35	+1.06
8	2	Felix Neureuther	Germany	1:22.51	8	1:24.08	11	2:46.59	+1.30
9	5	Thomas Fanara	France	1:22.41	4	1:24.32	16	2:46.73	+1.44
10	21	Henrik Kristoffersen	Norway	1:22.71	14	1:24.08	11	2:46.79	+1.50
11	24	Luca De Aliprandini	Italy	1:23.08	19	1:23.83	7	2:46.91	+1.62
12	6	Fritz Dopfer	Germany	1:22.59	11	1:24.38	17	2:46.97	+1.68
13	23	Carlo Janka	Switzerland	1:22.52	9	1:24.52	19	2:47.04	+1.75
14	19	Matts Olsson	Sweden	1:23.01	18	1:24.05	10	2:47.06	+1.77
15	22	Tim Jitloff	United States	1:23.23	21	1:23.90	8	2:47.13	+1.84
16	15	Leif Kristian Haugen	Norway	1:23.58	23	1:23.57	3	2:47.15	+1.86
17	20	Davide Simoncelli	Italy	1:22.35	3	1:25.00	23	2:47.35	+2.06
18	9	Philipp Schörghofer	Austria	1:22.83	15	1:24.63	20	2:47.46	+2.17
19	40	Jared Goldberg	United States	1:23.66	27	1:23.82	6	2:47.48	+2.19
20	16	Bode Miller	United States	1:23.64	26	1:24.18	13	2:47.82	+2.53
21	35	Samu Torsti	Finland	1:23.59	25	1:24.38	17	2:47.97	+2.68
22	30	Adam Žampa	Slovakia	1:23.13	20	1:25.28	26	2:48.41	+3.12
23	31	Žan Kranjec	Slovenia	1:23.82	29	1:24.66	21	2:48.48	+3.19
24	12	Mathieu Faivre	France	1:23.53	22	1:25.90	28	2:49.43	+4.14
25	36	Trevor Philp	Canada	1:24.38	31	1:25.17	25	2:49.55	+4.26
26	34	Sergei Maitakov	Russia	1:23.75	28	1:25.92	29	2:49.67	+4.38
27	25	Ivica Kostelić	Croatia	1:23.87	30	1:25.81	27	2:49.68	+4.39
28	46	Mauro Caviezel	Switzerland	1:23.58	23	1:26.17	34	2:49.75	+4.46
29	33	Philip Brown	Canada	1:24.82	32	1:25.09	24	2:49.91	+4.62
30	27	Gino Caviezel	Switzerland	1:25.45	35	1:24.95	22	2:50.40	+5.11
31	63	Martin Vráblík	Czech Republic	1:24.83	33	1:26.01	30	2:50.84	+5.55
32	39	Andreas Žampa	Slovakia	1:25.54	36	1:26.08	32	2:51.62	+6.33
33	48	Morgan Pridy	Canada	1:25.95	39	1:26.01	30	2:51.96	+6.67
34	38	Sebastian Brigović	Croatia	1:25.82	38	1:26.43	35	2:52.25	+6.96
35	41	Vladislav Novikov	Russia	1:25.68	37	1:26.97	37	2:52.65	+7.36
36	74	Paul de la Cuesta	Spain	1:27.13	45	1:26.13	33	2:53.26	+7.97
37	47	Klemen Kosi	Slovenia	1:26.61	43	1:26.75	36	2:53.36	+8.07
38	67	Marc Oliveras	Andorra	1:26.40	41	1:27.34	39	2:53.74	+8.45
39	43	Dominic Demschar	Australia	1:26.47	42	1:27.30	38	2:53.77	+8.48
40	44	Cristian Javier Simari Birkner	Argentina	1:26.02	40	1:27.89	40	2:53.91	+8.62
41	53	Jung Dong-Hyun	South Korea	1:26.72	44	1:28.54	41	2:55.26	+9.97
42	73	Marco Pfiffner	Liechtenstein	1:27.64	46	1:29.08	44	2:56.72	+11.43
43	49	Kristaps Zvejnieks	Latvia	1:27.80	47	1:29.50	46	2:57.30	+12.01
44	50	Adam Barwood	New Zealand	1:28.51	49	1:28.89	43	2:57.40	+12.11
45	62	Warren Cummings Smith	Estonia	1:28.25	48	1:29.17	45	2:57.42	+12.13
46	83	Arman Serebrakian	Armenia	1:29.59	54	1:28.81	42	2:58.40	+13.11
47	64	Adam Lamhamedi	Morocco	1:29.27	51	1:29.96	48	2:59.23	+13.94
48	69	Alexandru Barbu	Romania	1:29.47	52	1:29.77	47	2:59.24	+13.95
49	75	Marko Rudić	Bosnia and Herzegovina	1:29.55	53	1:30.40	49	2:59.95	+14.66
50	79	Norbert Farkas	Hungary	1:29.77	55	1:31.56	50	3:01.33	+16.04
51	60	Mohammad Kiyadarbandsari	Iran	1:30.12	56	1:32.01	52	3:02.13	+16.84
52	88	Kostas Sykaras	Greece	1:30.75	59	1:31.58	51	3:02.33	+17.04
53	59	Patrick Brachner	Azerbaijan	1:31.32	60	1:32.31	53	3:03.63	+18.34
54	78	Massimiliano Valcareggi	Greece	1:30.72	58	1:33.64	56	3:04.36	+19.07
55	80	Hossein Saveh-Shemshaki	Iran	1:32.35	62	1:32.87	55	3:05.22	+19.93
56	86	Einar Kristgeirsson	Iceland	1:32.90	63	1:32.55	54	3:05.45	+20.16
57	90	Luke Steyn	Zimbabwe	1:32.20	61	1:34.35	59	3:06.55	+21.26
58	84	Jhonatan Longhi	Brazil	1:33.03	64	1:33.69	57	3:06.72	+21.43
59	96	Brynjar Guðmundsson	Iceland	1:33.58	65	1:36.03	61	3:09.61	+24.32
60	94	Dmytro Mytsak	Ukraine	1:34.22	67	1:37.18	64	3:11.40	+26.11
61	100	Evgeniy Timofeev	Kyrgyzstan	1:34.65	68	1:37.07	63	3:11.72	+26.43
62	101	Tarik Hadžić	Montenegro	1:36.55	71	1:35.84	60	3:12.39	+27.10
63	99	Rokas Zaveckas	Lithuania	1:36.06	70	1:36.98	62	3:13.04	+27.75
64	104	Constantinos Papamichael	Cyprus	1:35.74	69	1:37.37	66	3:13.11	+27.82
65	98	Kanes Sucharitakul	Thailand	1:37.82	73	1:37.24	65	3:15.06	+29.77
66	61	Kyung Sung-hyun	South Korea	1:34.03	66	1:41.17	70	3:15.20	+29.91
67	107	Artem Voronov	Uzbekistan	1:37.09	72	1:38.36	68	3:15.45	+30.16
68	93	Emre Simsek	Turkey	1:40.26	76	1:37.38	67	3:17.64	+32.35
69	102	Alexandre Mohbat	Lebanon	1:38.96	75	1:38.89	69	3:17.85	+32.56
70	108	Manfred Oettl Reyes	Peru	1:47.05	78	1:33.91	58	3:20.96	+35.67
71	103	Muhammad Karim	Pakistan	1:43.44	77	1:43.97	71	3:27.41	+42.12
72	106	Himanshu Thakur	India	1:47.86	79	1:49.69	72	3:37.55	+52.26
	14	Roberto Nani	Italy	1:22.65	12	DNF			
	4	Manfred Moelgg	Italy	1:22.93	17	DNF			
	17	Kjetil Jansrud	Norway	1:22.91	16	DNF			
	32	Stepan Zuev	Russia	1:24.90	34	DNF			
	71	Ross Peraudo	Australia	1:29.07	50	DNF			
	91	Arthur Hanse	Portugal	1:30.52	57	DNF			
	89	Zhang Yuxin	China	1:38.45	74	DNF			
	26	Didier Defago	Switzerland	DNF					
	29	Kryštof Krýzl	Czech Republic	DNF					
	37	Pavel Trikhichev	Russia	DNF					
	42	Filip Zubčić	Croatia	DNF					
	45	Olivier Jenot	Monaco	DNF					
	51	Ferran Terra	Spain	DNF					
	52	Sebastiano Gastaldi	Argentina	DNF					
	54	Eugenio Claro	Chile	DNF					
	55	Park Je-yun	South Korea	DNF					
	56	Joan Verdú	Andorra	DNF					
	57	Stefan Prisadov	Bulgaria	DNF					
	58	Alex Puente Tasias	Spain	DNF					
	65	Jorge Birkner Ketelhohn	Argentina	DNF					
	66	Henrik von Appen	Chile	DNF					
	68	Pol Carreras	Spain	DNF					
	70	Marko Vukićević	Serbia	DNF					
	72	Alex Beniaidze	Georgia	DNF					
	76	Iason Abramashvili	Georgia	DNF					
	77	Martins Onskulis	Latvia	DNF					
	81	Igor Laikert	Bosnia and Herzegovina	DNF					
	82	Antonio Ristevski	Macedonia	DNF					
	85	Yuri Danilochkin	Belarus	DNF					
	95	Conor Lyne	Ireland	DNF					
	97	Dow Travers	Cayman Islands	DNF					
	109	Antonio Jose Pardo Andretta	Venezuela	DNF					
	13	Marcus Sandell	Finland	DNF					
	11	Stefan Luitz	Germany	DSQ					
	105	Vincenzo Michelotti	San Marino	DSQ					
	87	Erjon Tola	Albania	DNS					
	92	Virgile Vandeput	Israel	DNS					
