= Alpine skiing at the 2014 Winter Olympics – Men's slalom =

Men's slalom at the XXII Olympic Winter Games
- Alpine skiing
- Venue: Rosa Khutor Alpine Resort; Krasnaya Polyana, Russia
- Date: 22 February 2014
- Competitors: 115 from 61 nations
- Winning time: 1:41.84

Medalists
1st place, gold medalist(s)		Mario Matt	Austria
2nd place, silver medalist(s)		Marcel Hirscher	Austria
3rd place, bronze medalist(s)		Henrik Kristoffersen	Norway

Men's Slalom
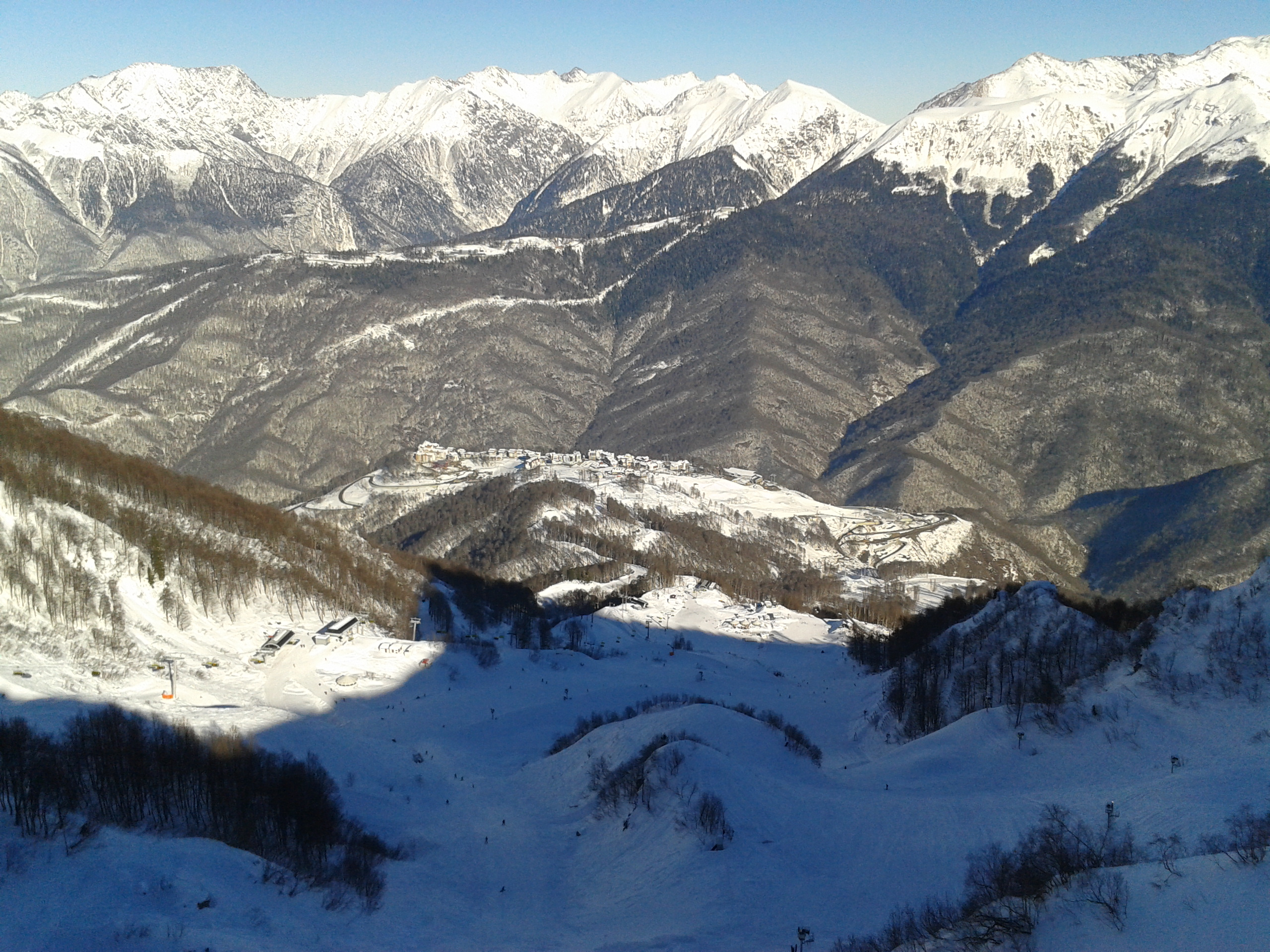
- Location: Rosa Khutor
- Vertical: 200 m (656 ft)
- Top elevation: 1,160 m (3,806 ft)
- Base elevation: 960 m (3,150 ft)

The men's slalom competition of the 2014 Winter Olympics at Sochi was held at Rosa Khutor Alpine Resort near Krasnaya Polyana, Russia, on Saturday, 22 February.

== Summary ==
The tenth and final alpine event of the Olympics, the two runs were held in spring-like conditions. The temperature at the starting gate for the first run exceeded 7 °C (45 °F) and 5 °C (41 °F) for the second run at night. Of the top eight times after the first run, five did not finish the second run (André Myhrer, Jean-Baptiste Grange, Ted Ligety, Felix Neureuther, and Alexis Pinturault), which spawned criticism of the course. The second run was set by Ante Kostelić, known for idiosyncratic gate settings. He is the father of competitor Ivica Kostelić of Croatia, who finished ninth.

Less than seven weeks shy of his 35th birthday, Mario Matt of Austria became the oldest gold medalist in Olympic alpine skiing history. The silver went to defending World Cup champion Marcel Hirscher, and Henrik Kristoffersen became the youngest male to medal in an Olympic alpine event at age 19.

== Results ==
The first run was held at 16:45 and the second run at 20:15.

Rank	Bib	Name	Nation	Run 1	Rank	Run 2	Rank	Total	Behind
1st place, gold medalist(s)	3	Mario Matt	Austria	46.70	1	55.14	6	1:41.84	—
2nd place, silver medalist(s)	4	Marcel Hirscher	Austria	47.98	9	54.14	2	1:42.12	+0.28
3rd place, bronze medalist(s)	5	Henrik Kristoffersen	Norway	48.49	15	54.18	3	1:42.67	+0.83
4	17	Stefano Gross	Italy	47.45	3	55.27	7	1:42.72	+0.88
4	9	Fritz Dopfer	Germany	48.46	14	54.26	4	1:42.72	+0.88
6	30	Adam Žampa	Slovakia	49.34	26	53.94	1	1:43.28	+1.44
7	14	Markus Larsson	Sweden	48.04	10	55.56	13	1:43.60	+1.76
7	2	Mattias Hargin	Sweden	47.45	3	56.15	16	1:43.60	+1.76
9	27	Sebastian Foss Solevåg	Norway	49.08	25	55.03	5	1:44.11	+2.27
9	8	Ivica Kostelić	Croatia	48.75	21	55.36	8	1:44.11	+2.27
11	25	Mitja Valenčič	Slovenia	48.32	11	55.82	15	1:44.14	+2.30
12	28	Leif Kristian Haugen	Norway	48.83	23	55.38	9	1:44.21	+2.37
13	31	Nolan Kasper	United States	48.70	18	55.52	10	1:44.22	+2.38
14	24	Aleksandr Khoroshilov	Russia	48.71	19	55.52	10	1:44.23	+2.39
15	34	Julien Lizeroux	France	48.69	17	55.63	14	1:44.32	+2.48
16	26	Michael Janyk	Canada	48.82	22	55.54	12	1:44.36	+2.52
17	35	Dave Ryding	Great Britain	49.40	27	56.51	17	1:45.91	+4.07
18	39	Dalibor Šamšal	Croatia	50.71	36	58.28	18	1:48.99	+7.15
19	37	Ramon Zenhäusern	Switzerland	51.01	39	58.39	19	1:49.40	+7.56
20	38	Philip Brown	Canada	49.97	34	59.68	20	1:49.65	+7.81
21	69	Alexandru Barbu	Romania	52.82	44	59.84	21	1:52.66	+10.82
22	68	Iason Abramashvili	Georgia	52.59	43	1:00.78	23	1:53.37	+11.53
23	52	Michał Jasiczek	Poland	52.88	45	1:00.60	22	1:53.48	+11.64
24	71	Marco Pfiffner	Liechtenstein	53.46	47	1:02.02	26	1:55.48	+13.64
25	63	Adam Barwood	New Zealand	54.21	50	1:01.97	25	1:56.18	+14.34
26	75	Warren Cummings Smith	Estonia	55.08	54	1:02.20	27	1:57.28	+15.44
27	90	Mārtiņš Onskulis	Latvia	56.16	61	1:01.44	24	1:57.60	+15.76
28	51	Matej Vidović	Croatia	51.74	42	1:06.07	33	1:57.81	+15.97
29	84	Antonio Ristevski	Macedonia	55.38	56	1:03.06	28	1:58.44	+16.60
30	78	Mohammad Kiyadarbandsari	Iran	55.09	55	1:03.78	29	1:58.87	+17.03
31	83	Hossein Saveh-Shemshaki	Iran	55.46	57	1:03.90	30	1:59.36	+17.52
32	80	Alex Puente Tasias	Spain	53.73	48	1:05.72	32	1:59.45	+17.61
33	53	Pavel Trikhichev	Russia	51.63	41	1:08.16	38	1:59.79	+17.95
34	91	Arman Serebrakian	Armenia	55.90	60	1:04.67	31	2:00.57	+18.73
35	95	Kostas Sykaras	Greece	57.83	64	1:06.25	34	2:04.08	+22.24
36	72	Brynjar Guðmundsson	Iceland	56.85	62	1:07.72	37	2:04.57	+22.73
37	100	Massimiliano Valcareggi	Greece	58.97	68	1:06.75	35	2:05.72	+23.88
38	106	Tarik Hadžić	Montenegro	1:00.95	71	1:06.99	36	2:07.94	+26.10
39	108	Artem Voronov	Uzbekistan	1:00.42	70	1:10.54	40	2:10.96	+29.12
40	107	Conor Lyne	Ireland	1:03.58	74	1:09.71	39	2:13.29	+31.45
41	110	Evgeniy Timofeev	Kyrgyzstan	1:02.47	73	1:12.96	41	2:15.43	+33.59
42	111	Alexandre Mohbat	Lebanon	1:03.77	75	1:18.02	42	2:21.79	+39.95
43	117	Yohan Goutt Gonçalves	Timor-Leste	1:09.01	77	1:21.88	43	2:30.89	+49.05
	1	André Myhrer	Sweden	47.15	2	DNF	—N/a		
	12	Jean-Baptiste Grange	France	47.47	5	DNF	—N/a		
	16	Ted Ligety	United States	47.56	6	DNF	—N/a		
	7	Felix Neureuther	Germany	47.57	7	DNF	—N/a		
	10	Alexis Pinturault	France	47.78	8	DNF	—N/a		
	15	Manfred Mölgg	Italy	48.38	12	DNF	—N/a		
	22	Giuliano Razzoli	Italy	48.50	16	DNF	—N/a		
	19	Naoki Yuasa	Japan	48.74	20	DNF	—N/a		
	32	Akira Sasaki	Japan	49.54	28	DNF	—N/a		
	42	Trevor Philp	Canada	49.55	29	DNF	—N/a		
	36	Santeri Paloniemi	Finland	49.57	31	DNF	—N/a		
	40	Kryštof Krýzl	Czech Republic	49.63	32	DNF	—N/a		
	44	Justin Murisier	Switzerland	49.92	33	DNF	—N/a		
	46	Natko Zrnčić-Dim	Croatia	50.64	35	DNF	—N/a		
	41	Stefan Luitz	Germany	50.79	37	DNF	—N/a		
	47	Filip Trejbal	Czech Republic	50.80	38	DNF	—N/a		
	59	Nikola Chongarov	Bulgaria	51.12	40	DNF	—N/a		
	67	Sebastiano Gastaldi	Argentina	53.24	46	DNF	—N/a		
	58	Einar Kristgeirsson	Iceland	54.04	49	DNF	—N/a		
	87	Adam Lamhamedi	Morocco	54.47	51	DNF	—N/a		
	73	Igor Laikert	Bosnia and Herzegovina	54.68	52	DNF	—N/a		
	74	Mateusz Garniewicz	Poland	54.93	53	DNF	—N/a		
	94	Norbert Farkas	Hungary	55.68	58	DNF	—N/a		
	77	Olivier Jenot	Monaco	55.89	59	DNF	—N/a		
	93	Eugenio Claro	Chile	57.08	63	DNF	—N/a		
	109	Manfred Oettl Reyes	Peru	58.36	65	DNF	—N/a		
	92	Dominic Demschar	Australia	58.52	66	DNF	—N/a		
	82	Andreas Žampa	Slovakia	58.65	67	DNF	—N/a		
	114	Dow Travers	Cayman Islands	1:07.03	76	DNF	—N/a		
	29	Daniel Yule	Switzerland	48.38	12	DSQ	—N/a		
	23	Axel Bäck	Sweden	49.02	24	DSQ	—N/a		
	33	Brad Spence	Canada	49.55	29	DSQ	—N/a		
	97	Jhonatan Longhi	Brazil	59.24	69	DSQ	—N/a		
	102	Dmytro Mytsak	Ukraine	1:01.57	72	DSQ	—N/a		
	6	Patrick Thaler	Italy	DNF	—N/a				
	11	Reinfried Herbst	Austria	DNF	—N/a				
	13	Benjamin Raich	Austria	DNF	—N/a				
	18	Steve Missillier	France	DNF	—N/a				
	20	David Chodounsky	United States	DNF	—N/a				
	21	Luca Aerni	Switzerland	DNF	—N/a				
	43	Jung Dong-Hyun	South Korea	DNF	—N/a				
	45	Sergei Maitakov	Russia	DNF	—N/a				
	49	Kristaps Zvejnieks	Latvia	DNF	—N/a				
	50	Stefan Prisadov	Bulgaria	DNF	—N/a				
	54	Georgi Georgiev	Bulgaria	DNF	—N/a				
	55	Žan Kranjec	Slovenia	DNF	—N/a				
	56	Stepan Zuev	Russia	DNF	—N/a				
	57	Cristian Javier Simari Birkner	Argentina	DNF	—N/a				
	60	Kyung Sung-hyun	South Korea	DNF	—N/a				
	61	Matej Falat	Slovakia	DNF	—N/a				
	62	Ross Peraudo	Australia	DNF	—N/a				
	64	Pol Carreras	Spain	DNF	—N/a				
	65	Patrick Brachner	Azerbaijan	DNF	—N/a				
	66	Klemen Kosi	Slovenia	DNF	—N/a				
	70	Maciej Bydliński	Poland	DNF	—N/a				
	76	Park Je-yun	South Korea	DNF	—N/a				
	79	Emre Şimşek	Turkey	DNF	—N/a				
	81	Martin Vráblík	Czech Republic	DNF	—N/a				
	85	Jorge Birkner Ketelhohn	Argentina	DNF	—N/a				
	86	Alex Beniaidze	Georgia	DNF	—N/a				
	88	Marko Vukićević	Serbia	DNF	—N/a				
	89	Marko Rudić	Bosnia and Herzegovina	DNF	—N/a				
	96	Arthur Hanse	Portugal	DNF	—N/a				
	98	Roberts Rode	Latvia	DNF	—N/a				
	101	Yuri Danilochkin	Belarus	DNF	—N/a				
	103	Zhang Yuxin	China	DNF	—N/a				
	104	Rokas Zaveckas	Lithuania	DNF	—N/a				
	105	Constantinos Papamichael	Cyprus	DNF	—N/a				
	112	Luke Steyn	Zimbabwe	DNF	—N/a				
	113	Hubertus Von Hohenlohe	Mexico	DNF	—N/a				
	115	Alisher Qudratov	Tajikistan	DNF	—N/a				
	116	Kanes Sucharitakul	Thailand	DNF	—N/a				
	48	Ondřej Bank	Czech Republic	DNS	—N/a				
	99	Erjon Tola	Albania	DNS	—N/a				
