= Alpine skiing at the 2014 Winter Olympics – Men's super-G =

Men's super-G at the XXII Olympic Winter Games
- Alpine skiing pictogram
- Venue: Rosa Khutor Alpine Resort
- Date: 16 February
- Competitors: 63 from 28 nations
- Winning time: 1:18.14

Medalists
1st place, gold medalist(s)		Kjetil Jansrud	Norway
2nd place, silver medalist(s)		Andrew Weibrecht	United States
3rd place, bronze medalist(s)		Jan Hudec	Canada
3rd place, bronze medalist(s)		Bode Miller	United States

Men's Super-G
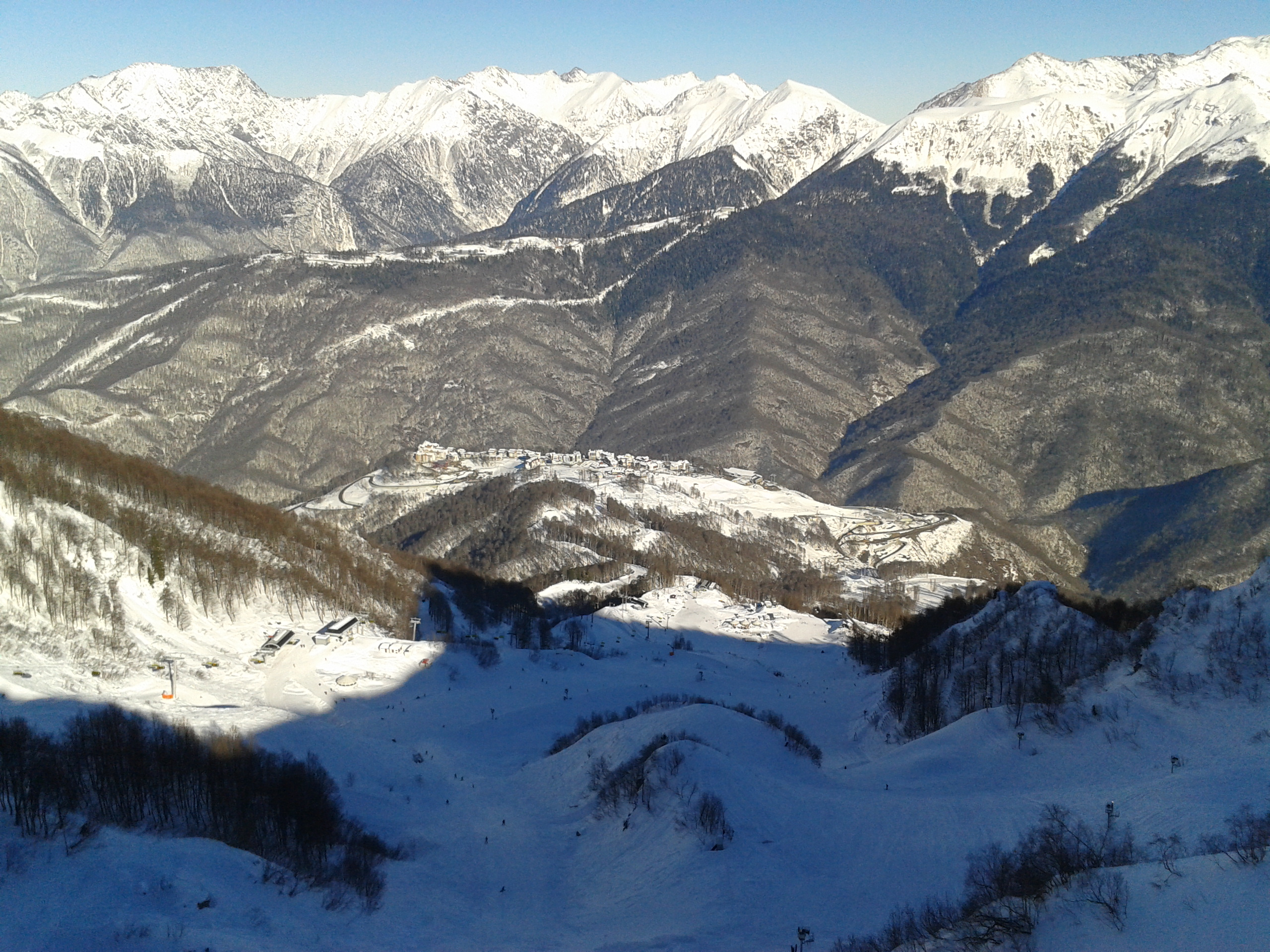
- Location: Rosa Khutor
- Vertical: 622 m (2,041 ft)
- Top elevation: 1,592 m (5,223 ft)
- Base elevation: 970 m (3,182 ft)

The men's super-G competition of the Sochi 2014 Olympics was held at the Rosa Khutor Alpine Resort, near Krasnaya Polyana, Russia, on Sunday, 16 February.

Kjetil Jansrud of Norway won the gold medal and Andrew Weibrecht of the United States took the silver. Two bronze medals were awarded for the third-place tie between Jan Hudec of Canada and Bode Miller of the U.S.

The vertical drop of the course was 622 m (2,041 ft), starting at an elevation of 1,592 m (5,223 ft) above sea level, with a length of 2.096 km (1.30 mi). Jansrud's winning time of 78.14 seconds yielded an average course speed of 96.565 km/h (60.0 mph), with an average vertical descent rate of 7.960 m/s (26.1 ft/s).

Jansrud's win was the fourth straight in this event for Norway, following Kjetil André Aamodt (2002, 2006) and Aksel Lund Svindal (2010).

== Results ==
The race was started at 10:00 local time, (UTC+4). At the starting gate, the skies were partly cloudy, the temperature was 1.0 °C (34 °F), and the snow condition was hard. The temperature at the finish was 5.1 °C (41 °F).

Rank	Bib	Name	Country	Time	Difference
1st place, gold medalist(s)	21	Kjetil Jansrud	Norway	1:18.14	—
2nd place, silver medalist(s)	29	Andrew Weibrecht	United States	1:18.44	+0.30
3rd place, bronze medalist(s)	22	Jan Hudec	Canada	1:18.67	+0.53
3rd place, bronze medalist(s)	13	Bode Miller	United States	1:18.67	+0.53
5	15	Otmar Striedinger	Austria	1:18.69	+0.55
6	14	Max Franz	Austria	1:18.74	+0.60
7	16	Aksel Lund Svindal	Norway	1:18.76	+0.62
8	8	Peter Fill	Italy	1:18.85	+0.71
9	34	Ondřej Bank	Czech Republic	1:19.11	+0.97
10	6	Morgan Pridy	Canada	1:19.19	+1.05
11	20	Adrien Théaux	France	1:19.35	+1.21
12	19	Patrick Küng	Switzerland	1:19.38	+1.24
13	24	Aleksander Aamodt Kilde	Norway	1:19.44	+1.30
14	9	Ted Ligety	United States	1:19.48	+1.34
15	2	Thomas Mermillod-Blondin	France	1:19.53	+1.39
16	27	Dominik Paris	Italy	1:19.70	+1.56
17	26	David Poisson	France	1:19.74	+1.60
17	11	Werner Heel	Italy	1:19.74	+1.60
19	5	Johan Clarey	France	1:19.75	+1.61
19	3	Natko Zrnčić-Dim	Croatia	1:19.75	+1.61
21	18	Georg Streitberger	Austria	1:19.77	+1.63
22	28	Carlo Janka	Switzerland	1:20.01	+1.87
23	25	Travis Ganong	United States	1:20.02	+1.88
24	30	Manuel Osborne-Paradis	Canada	1:20.19	+2.05
24	1	Ivica Kostelić	Croatia	1:20.19	+2.05
26	33	Pavel Trikhichev	Russia	1:20.62	+2.48
27	7	Beat Feuz	Switzerland	1:20.65	+2.51
28	51	Adam Žampa	Slovakia	1:20.95	+2.81
29	32	Klemen Kosi	Slovenia	1:21.27	+3.13
30	37	Dmitriy Koshkin	Kazakhstan	1:21.50	+3.36
31	49	Stepan Zuev	Russia	1:21.54	+3.40
32	50	Henrik von Appen	Chile	1:21.88	+3.74
33	40	Martin Vráblík	Czech Republic	1:22.01	+3.87
34	42	Marc Oliveras	Andorra	1:22.02	+3.88
35	35	Olivier Jenot	Monaco	1:22.20	+4.06
36	61	Andreas Žampa	Slovakia	1:22.42	+4.28
37	52	Yuri Danilochkin	Belarus	1:22.45	+4.31
38	39	Maciej Bydliński	Poland	1:22.51	+4.37
39	57	Nikola Chongarov	Bulgaria	1:22.59	+4.45
40	44	Martin Khuber	Kazakhstan	1:22.60	+4.46
41	55	Georgi Georgiev	Bulgaria	1:22.72	+4.58
42	53	Matej Falat	Slovakia	1:22.81	+4.67
43	43	Martin Bendík	Slovakia	1:23.06	+4.92
44	48	Igor Zakurdayev	Kazakhstan	1:23.13	+4.99
45	56	Eugenio Claro	Chile	1:23.31	+5.17
46	46	Christoffer Faarup	Denmark	1:23.34	+5.20
47	38	Cristian Javier Simari Birkner	Argentina	1:23.36	+5.22
48	41	Marko Vukićević	Serbia	1:23.88	+5.74
49	54	Jorge Birkner Ketelhohn	Argentina	1:23.89	+5.75
50	63	Igor Laikert	Bosnia and Herzegovina	1:24.20	+6.06
51	62	Kostas Sykaras	Greece	1:26.32	+8.18
52	58	Dmytro Mytsak	Ukraine	1:28.51	+10.37
	4	Aleksandr Glebov	Russia	DNF	
	10	Didier Défago	Switzerland	DNF	
	12	Christof Innerhofer	Italy	DNF	
	17	Matthias Mayer	Austria	DNF	
	31	Paul de la Cuesta	Spain	DNF	
	45	Georg Lindner	Moldova	DNF	
	47	Arnaud Alessandria	Monaco	DNF	
	60	Roberts Rode	Latvia	DNF	
	23	Erik Guay	Canada	DSQ	
	36	Ferran Terra	Spain	DSQ	
	59	Massimiliano Valcareggi	Greece	DSQ	
