= Norbert Farkas =

Norbert Farkas may refer to:

- Norbert Farkas (alpine skier) (born 1992), Hungarian alpine skier
- Norbert Farkas (footballer born 1977), Hungarian footballer
- Norbert Farkas (footballer born 1992), Hungarian footballer
