= Valcareggi =

Valcareggi is an Italian surname. Notable people with the surname include:

- Ferruccio Valcareggi (1919–2005), Italian footballer and manager
- Massimiliano Valcareggi (born 1995), Italian alpine skier
