= Czech Republic at the 2014 Winter Olympics =

- IOC code: CZE
- NOC: Czech Olympic Committee
- Website: www.olympic.cz (in Czech and English)

in Sochi, Russia 7 February-23 February
- Competitors: 88 in 13 sports
- Flag bearers: Šárka Strachová (opening); Ondřej Moravec (closing)
- Medals Ranked 15th: Gold 2 Silver 4 Bronze 3 Total 9

Winter Olympics appearances (overview)
- 1994; 1998; 2002; 2006; 2010; 2014; 2018; 2022; 2026

Other related appearances
- Czechoslovakia (1924–1992)

Czech Republic competed at the 2014 Winter Olympics in Sochi, Russia, from 7 to 23 February 2014. A team of 83 athletes in 11 sports competed for the country.

== Medalists ==
Medals by sport
Sport	1st place, gold medalist(s)	2nd place, silver medalist(s)	3rd place, bronze medalist(s)	Total
Biathlon	0	3	3	5
Speed skating	1	1	0	2
Snowboarding	1	0	0	1
Total	2	4	3	9

Medals by date
Day	Date	1st place, gold medalist(s)	2nd place, silver medalist(s)	3rd place, bronze medalist(s)	Total
Day 1	8 February	0	0	1	1
Day 2	9 February	0	1	0	1
Day 3	10 February	0	1	0	1
Day 4	11 February	0	0	0	0
Day 5	12 February	0	0	0	0
Day 6	13 February	0	0	0	0
Day 7	14 February	0	0	0	0
Day 8	15 February	0	0	0	0
Day 9	16 February	1	0	0	1
Day 10	17 February	0	1	0	1
Day 11	18 February	0	0	1	1
Day 12	19 February	1	1	0	2
Day 13	20 February	0	0	0	0
Day 14	21 February	0	0	1	1
Day 15	22 February	0	0	0	0
Day 16	23 February	0	0	0	0
Total		2	4	3	9

Medal	Name	Sport	Event	Date
Gold	Eva Samková	Snowboarding	Women's snowboard cross	16 February
Gold	Martina Sáblíková	Speed skating	Women's 5000 m	19 February
Silver	Martina Sáblíková	Speed skating	Women's 3000 m	9 February
Silver	Ondřej Moravec	Biathlon	Men's pursuit	10 February
Silver	Gabriela Soukalová	Biathlon	Women's mass start	17 February
Silver	Ondřej Moravec; Gabriela Soukalová; Jaroslav Soukup; Veronika Vítková	Biathlon	Mixed relay	19 February
Bronze	Jaroslav Soukup	Biathlon	Men's sprint	8 February
Bronze	Ondřej Moravec	Biathlon	Men's mass start	18 February
Bronze	Eva Puskarčíková; Gabriela Soukalová; Jitka Landová; Veronika Vítková	Biathlon	Women's relay	21 February

== Alpine skiing ==
Czech Republic qualified for the following events:

Men

Athlete	Event	Run 1		Run 2		Total	
Athlete	Event	Time	Rank	Time	Rank	Time	Rank
Ondřej Bank	Downhill	—N/a				2:08.24	20
Ondřej Bank	Super-G	—N/a				1:19.11	9
Ondřej Bank	Combined	1:53.38	2	53.46	16	2:46.84	7
Ondřej Bank	Slalom	DNS					
Ondřej Bank	Giant slalom	1:22.01	2	1:24.28	15	2:46.29	5
Kryštof Krýzl	Slalom	49.63	32	DNF			
Kryštof Krýzl	Giant slalom	DNF					
Kryštof Krýzl	Combined	1:56.68	32	53.21	14	2:49.89	19
Filip Trejbal	Slalom	50.80	38	DNF			
Martin Vráblík	Downhill	—N/a				2:11.73	35
Martin Vráblík	Super-G	—N/a				1:22.01	33
Martin Vráblík	Combined	1:56.36	29	51.56	5	2:47.92	16
Martin Vráblík	Slalom	DNF					
Martin Vráblík	Giant slalom	1:24.83	33	1:26.01	=30	2:50.84	31

Women

Athlete	Event	Run 1		Run 2		Total	
Athlete	Event	Time	Rank	Time	Rank	Time	Rank
Martina Dubovská	Slalom	57.80	28	53.62	21	1:51.42	22
Martina Dubovská	Giant slalom	DNF					
Klára Křížová	Downhill	—N/a				1:43.47	21
Klára Křížová	Super-G	—N/a				1:28.30	17
Klára Křížová	Combined	1:44.89	18	57.51	17	2:42.40	19
Kateřina Pauláthová	Super-G	—N/a				1:30.17	25
Kateřina Pauláthová	Slalom	DNF					
Kateřina Pauláthová	Giant slalom	DNF					
Šárka Strachová	Combined	1:46.51	25	50.10	1	2:36.61	9
Šárka Strachová	Slalom	55.14	14	52.25	7	1:47.39	10
Šárka Strachová	Giant slalom	DNF					

== Biathlon ==
Based on their performance at the 2012 and 2013 Biathlon World Championships, Czech Republic qualified 5 men and 5 women.

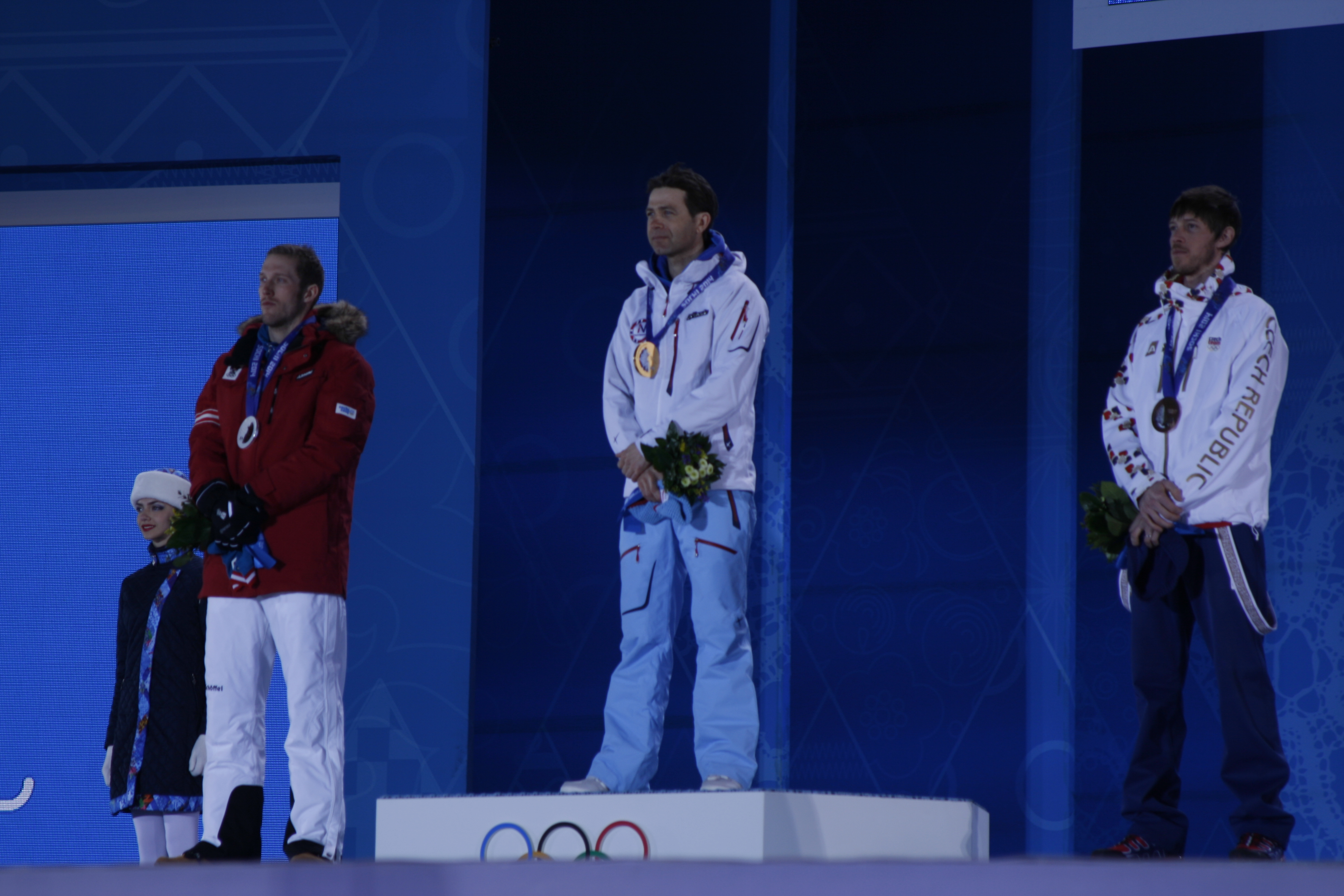
Jaroslav Soukup won bronze in the men's sprint

Men

Athlete	Event	Time	Misses	Rank
Michal Krčmář	Individual	56:14.1	3 (1+1+1+0)	61
Tomáš Krupčík	Sprint	27:39.3	2 (1+1)	75
Ondřej Moravec	Sprint	24:48.1	0 (0+0)	8
Ondřej Moravec	Pursuit	34:02.7	0 (0+0+0+0)	2nd place, silver medalist(s)
Ondřej Moravec	Individual	51:55.8	2 (1+0+0+1)	18
Ondřej Moravec	Mass start	42:42.9	0 (0+0+0+0)	3rd place, bronze medalist(s)
Michal Šlesingr	Sprint	25:51.7	1 (1+0)	31
Michal Šlesingr	Pursuit	DNS		
Michal Šlesingr	Individual	55:57.9	2 (1+0+0+1)	57
Jaroslav Soukup	Sprint	24:39.2	0 (0+0)	3rd place, bronze medalist(s)
Jaroslav Soukup	Pursuit	35:35.0	4 (0+0+2+2)	20
Jaroslav Soukup	Individual	51:55.1	1 (1+0+0+0)	17
Jaroslav Soukup	Mass start	45:22.2	4 (0+1+0+3)	24
Michal Krčmář; Tomáš Krupčík; Ondřej Moravec; Jaroslav Soukup	Team relay	1:15:11.9	5 (0+5)	11

Women

Athlete	Event	Time	Misses	Rank
Jitka Landová	Sprint	23:16.9	2 (1+1)	50
Jitka Landová	Pursuit	35:37.6	5 (0+2+3+0)	52
Jitka Landová	Individual	52:05.7	6 (2+1+2+1)	60
Eva Puskarčíková	Sprint	23:00.9	1 (1+0)	45
Eva Puskarčíková	Pursuit	33:59.0	2 (0+0+1+1)	42
Eva Puskarčíková	Individual	47:34.6	1 (0+0+0+1)	22
Gabriela Soukalová	Sprint	22:17.5	3 (3 + 0)	29
Gabriela Soukalová	Pursuit	30:18.3	1 (0+0+0+1)	4
Gabriela Soukalová	Individual	45:17.1	2 (0+1+0+1)	4
Gabriela Soukalová	Mass start	35:45.8	1 (0+0+0+1)	2nd place, silver medalist(s)
Veronika Vítková	Sprint	21:50.8	0 (0+0)	16
Veronika Vítková	Pursuit	31:42.9	2 (1+0+0+1)	21
Veronika Vítková	Individual	45:46.0	1 (0+0+0+1)	6
Veronika Vítková	Mass start	36:49.3	0 (0+0+0+0)	8
Jitka Landová; Eva Puskarčíková; Gabriela Soukalová; Veronika Vítková	Team relay	1:11:25.7	14 (0+14)	(bronze) ^{1}

^{1}The medal was reallocated after the disqualification of the Russian team for doping.

Mixed

Athlete	Event	Time	Misses	Rank
Ondřej Moravec; Gabriela Soukalová; Jaroslav Soukup; Veronika Vítková	Team relay	1:09:49.6	7 (0+7)	2nd place, silver medalist(s)

== Bobsleigh ==
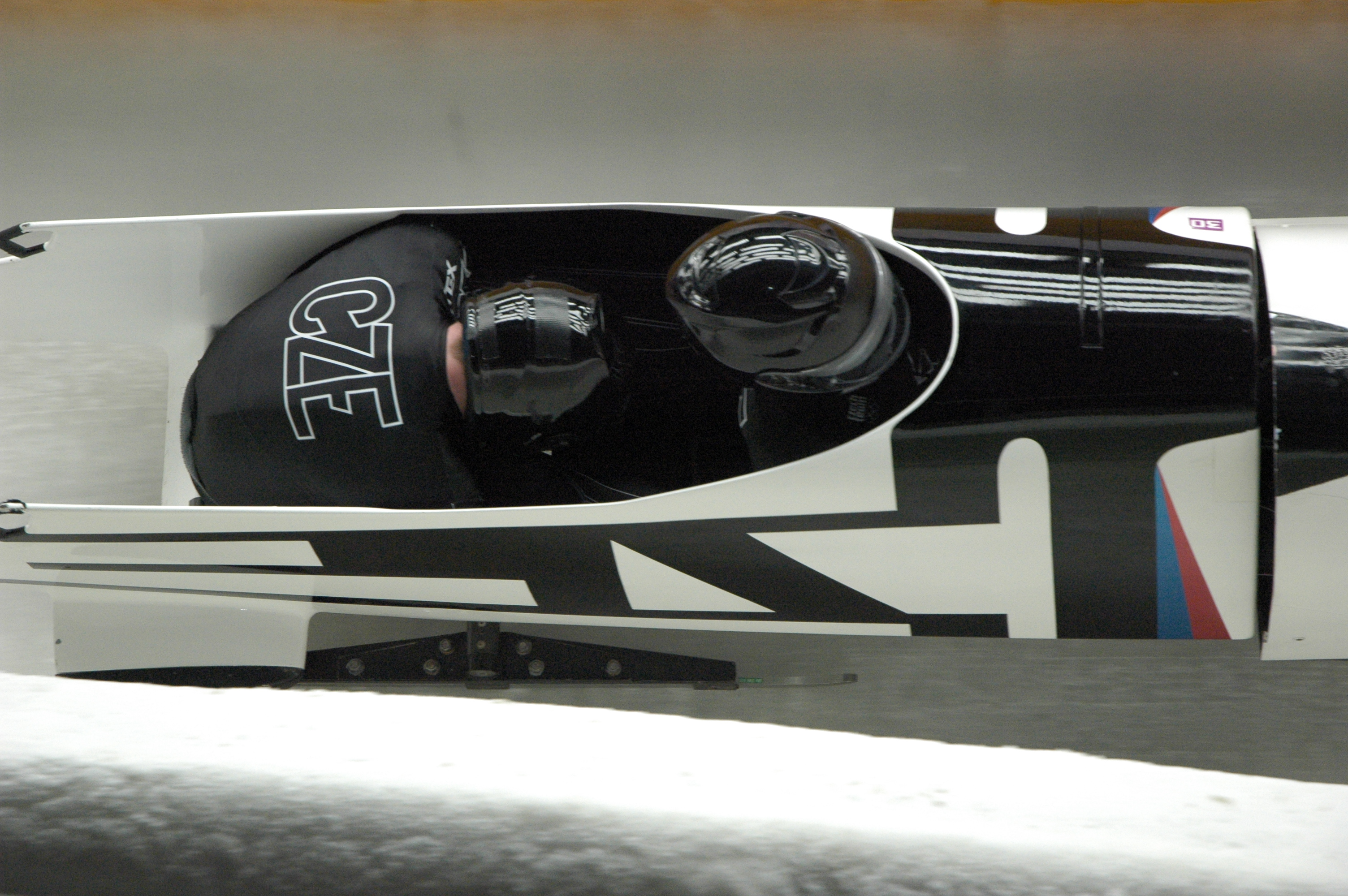
Czech Two-man sled

Czech Republic qualified a four-man sled in bobsleigh. The qualification was based on the world rankings as of 20 January 2014.

Athlete	Event	Run 1		Run 2		Run 3		Run 4		Total	
Athlete	Event	Time	Rank	Time	Rank	Time	Rank	Time	Rank	Time	Rank
Michal Vacek; Jan Vrba*	Two-man	57.72	24	57.75	23	57.71	23	Did not advance		2:53.18	24
Dominik Dvořák; Dominik Suchý; Michal Vacek; Jan Vrba*	Four-man	55.95	17	55.47	=7	55.95	14	55.80	13	3:43.17	14

* – Denotes the driver of each sled

== Cross-country skiing ==
According to the quota allocation released on 20 January 2014, Czech Republic qualified a total quota of 10 athletes in the following events.

Distance
Men

Athlete	Event	Classical		Freestyle		Final		
Athlete	Event	Time	Rank	Time	Rank	Time	Deficit	Rank
Lukáš Bauer	15 km classical	—N/a				39:28.6	+58.9	5
Lukáš Bauer	50 km freestyle	—N/a				1:48:51.3	+1:56.1	31
Martin Jakš	30 km skiathlon	37:20.5	39	33:00.9	24	1:10:25.1	+2:36.7	28
Martin Jakš	50 km freestyle	—N/a				1:50:00.5	+3:05.3	37
Jiří Magál	30 km skiathlon	37:45.6	46	34:23.0	43	1:12:49.5	+4:34.1	44
Jiří Magál	50 km freestyle	—N/a				1:56:28.7	+9:33.5	52
Petr Novák	30 km skiathlon	37:56.0	47	32:59.2	21	1:11:28.5	+3:13.1	36
Petr Novák	50 km freestyle	—N/a				1:48:41.0	+1:45.8	29
Lukáš Bauer; Martin Jakš; Dušan Kožíšek; Aleš Razým	4×10 km relay	—N/a				1:30:36.8	+1:54.8	8

Women

Athlete	Event	Classical		Freestyle		Final		
Athlete	Event	Time	Rank	Time	Rank	Time	Deficit	Rank
Klára Moravcová	10 km classical	—N/a				32:00.6	+3:42.8	48
Klára Moravcová	15 km skiathlon	22:00.9	56	21:57.2	56	44:40.8	+6:07.2	58
Klára Moravcová	30 km freestyle	—N/a				1:20:56.4	+9:51.2	45
Petra Nováková	15 km skiathlon	20:16.5	33	20:26.0	33	41:20.7	+2:47.1	36
Petra Nováková	30 km freestyle	—N/a				1:17:49.6	+6:44.4	37
Eva Vrabcová-Nývltová	10 km classical	—N/a				30:06.7	+1:48.9	19
Eva Vrabcová-Nývltová	15 km skiathlon	19:51.0	17	19:44.1	11	40:08.8	+1:35.2	11
Eva Vrabcová-Nývltová	30 km freestyle	—N/a				1:12:27.1	+1:21.9	5
Karolína Grohová; Klára Moravcová; Petra Nováková; Eva Vrabcová-Nývltová	4×5 km relay	—N/a				56:29.8	+3:27.1	10

Sprint

Athlete	Event	Qualification		Quarterfinal		Semifinal		Final	
Athlete	Event	Time	Rank	Time	Rank	Time	Rank	Time	Rank
Dušan Kožíšek	Men's sprint	3:40.56	41	Did not advance					
Aleš Razým	Men's sprint	3:43.24	49	Did not advance					
Martin Jakš; Aleš Razým	Men's team sprint	—N/a				23:39.06	2 Q	24:01.83	9
Karolína Grohová	Women's sprint	2:41.75	38	Did not advance					
Petra Nováková	Women's sprint	2:39.44	25 Q	2:47.52	5	Did not advance			

== Figure skating ==
Czech Republic achieved the following quota places:

Athlete	Event	SP		FS		Total	
Athlete	Event	Points	Rank	Points	Rank	Points	Rank
Michal Březina	Men's singles	81.95	12 Q	151.67	13	233.62	10
Tomáš Verner	Men's singles	81.09	13 Q	151.90	12	232.99	11
Elizaveta Ukolova	Ladies' singles	51.87	20 Q	84.55	23	136.42	22

== Freestyle skiing ==
Czech Republic qualified five quota places in the following events:

Moguls

Athlete	Event	Qualification								Final											
Athlete	Event	Run 1				Run 2				Run 1				Run 2				Run 3			
Athlete	Event	Time	Points	Total	Rank	Time	Points	Total	Rank	Time	Points	Total	Rank	Time	Points	Total	Rank	Time	Points	Total	Rank
Nikola Sudová	Women's moguls	31.30	14.86	20.38	11	31.48	14.98	20.43	3 Q	30.76	16.08	21.82	1 Q	32.09	15.76	20.97	9	Did not advance			
Tereza Vaculíková	Women's moguls	34.03	13.02	17.46	20	DNF				Did not advance											

Ski cross

Athlete	Event	Seeding		Round of 16	Quarterfinal	Semifinal	Final	
Athlete	Event	Time	Rank	Position	Position	Position	Position	Rank
Tomáš Kraus	Men's ski cross	1:17.41	10	3	Did not advance			18
Nikol Kučerová	Women's ski cross	DNF	27	3	Did not advance			24
Andrea Zemanová	Women's ski cross	1:25.96	20	3	Did not advance			21

Qualification legend: FA – Qualify to medal round; FB – Qualify to consolation round

Slopestyle

Athlete	Event	Qualification				Final			
Athlete	Event	Run 1	Run 2	Best	Rank	Run 1	Run 2	Best	Rank
Marek Skála	Men's slopestyle	51.60	54.60	54.60	26	Did not advance			

== Ice hockey ==
Czech Republic qualified a men's team by being one of the 9 highest ranked teams in the IIHF World Ranking following the 2012 World Championships.

=== Men's tournament ===
Roster

The following is the Czech roster in the men's ice hockey tournament of the 2014 Winter Olympics.

No.	Pos.	Name	Height	Weight	Birthdate	Birthplace	2013–14 team
1	G	Jakub Kovář	184 cm (6 ft 0 in)	91 kg (201 lb)	19 July 1988	Písek	(Russia) Avtomobilist Yekaterinburg (KHL)
2	D	Marek Židlický	180 cm (5 ft 11 in)	85 kg (187 lb)	3 February 1977	Most	(United States) New Jersey Devils (NHL)
3	D	Radko Gudas	183 cm (6 ft 0 in)	92 kg (203 lb)	5 June 1990	Kladno	(United States) Tampa Bay Lightning (NHL)
5	D	Ladislav Šmíd	191 cm (6 ft 3 in)	102 kg (225 lb)	1 February 1986	Frýdlant	(Canada) Calgary Flames (NHL)
7	D	Tomáš Kaberle	185 cm (6 ft 1 in)	97 kg (214 lb)	2 March 1978	Rakovník	(Czech Republic) Kladno (CZE)
8	D	Michal Barinka	192 cm (6 ft 4 in)	102 kg (225 lb)	12 June 1984	Vyškov	(Czech Republic) Vítkovice (CZE)
9	F	Milan Michálek	188 cm (6 ft 2 in)	103 kg (227 lb)	7 December 1984	Jindřichův Hradec	(Canada) Ottawa Senators (NHL)
10	F	Roman Červenka	181 cm (5 ft 11 in)	91 kg (201 lb)	10 December 1985	Prague	(Russia) SKA Saint Petersburg (KHL)
11	F	Martin Hanzal	196 cm (6 ft 5 in)	99 kg (218 lb)	20 February 1987	České Budějovice	(United States) Phoenix Coyotes (NHL)
12	F	Jiří Novotný	188 cm (6 ft 2 in)	94 kg (207 lb)	12 August 1983	Pelhřimov	(Russia) Lokomotiv Yaroslavl (KHL)
14	F	Tomáš Plekanec – C	180 cm (5 ft 11 in)	89 kg (196 lb)	31 October 1982	Kladno	(Canada) Montreal Canadiens (NHL)
18	F	Ondřej Palát	181 cm (5 ft 11 in)	79 kg (174 lb)	28 March 1991	Frýdek-Místek	(United States) Tampa Bay Lightning (NHL)
23	D	Zbyněk Michálek	189 cm (6 ft 2 in)	95 kg (209 lb)	23 December 1982	Jindřichův Hradec	(United States) Phoenix Coyotes (NHL)
25	D	Lukáš Krajíček	189 cm (6 ft 2 in)	93 kg (205 lb)	11 March 1983	Prostějov	(Belarus) Dinamo Minsk (KHL)
26	F	Patrik Eliáš – A	185 cm (6 ft 1 in)	88 kg (194 lb)	13 April 1976	Třebíč	(United States) New Jersey Devils (NHL)
31	G	Ondřej Pavelec	189 cm (6 ft 2 in)	100 kg (220 lb)	31 August 1987	Kladno	(Canada) Winnipeg Jets (NHL)
32	D	Michal Rozsíval	185 cm (6 ft 1 in)	87 kg (192 lb)	3 September 1978	Vlašim	(United States) Chicago Blackhawks (NHL)
46	F	David Krejčí	183 cm (6 ft 0 in)	80 kg (180 lb)	28 April 1986	Šternberk	(United States) Boston Bruins (NHL)
53	G	Alexander Salák	186 cm (6 ft 1 in)	86 kg (190 lb)	5 January 1987	Strakonice	(Russia) SKA Saint Petersburg (KHL)
67	F	Michael Frolík	185 cm (6 ft 1 in)	89 kg (196 lb)	17 February 1988	Kladno	(Canada) Winnipeg Jets (NHL)
68	F	Jaromír Jágr – A	189 cm (6 ft 2 in)	104 kg (229 lb)	15 February 1972	Kladno	(United States) New Jersey Devils (NHL)
83	F	Aleš Hemský	183 cm (6 ft 0 in)	84 kg (185 lb)	13 August 1983	Pardubice	(Canada) Edmonton Oilers (NHL)
89	F	Jakub Voráček	189 cm (6 ft 2 in)	96 kg (212 lb)	15 August 1989	Kladno	(United States) Philadelphia Flyers (NHL)
91	F	Martin Erat	183 cm (6 ft 0 in)	91 kg (201 lb)	28 August 1981	Třebíč	(United States) Washington Capitals (NHL)
93	F	Petr Nedvěd	192 cm (6 ft 4 in)	93 kg (205 lb)	9 December 1971	Liberec	(Czech Republic) Bílí Tygři Liberec (CZE)

Forward Vladimír Sobotka was also selected but was unable to participate due to injury. He was replaced by Martin Erat.

Group stage

Team	Pld	W	OTW	OTL	L	GF	GA	GD	Pts	Qualification
Sweden	3	3	0	0	0	10	5	+5	9	Quarterfinals
Switzerland	3	2	0	0	1	2	1	+1	6	
Czech Republic	3	1	0	0	2	6	7	−1	3	
Latvia	3	0	0	0	3	5	10	−5	0	

Source: ESPN

12 February 2014; 21:00	Czech Republic	2–4 (0–2, 2–2, 0–0)	Sweden	Bolshoy Ice Dome, Sochi; Attendance: 11,419

Game reference

Jakub Kovář (out 20:51)
Alexander Salák (in 20:51)
Goalies
Henrik Lundqvist
Referees:
(Russia) Konstantin Olenin
(Canada) Kelly Sutherland
Linesmen:
(Belarus) Ivan Dedioulia
(Canada) Greg Devorski

	0–1	10:07 – E. Karlsson (O. Ekman-Larsson, A. Steen)
	0–2	13:17 – P. Berglund (O. Ekman-Larsson, H. Lundqvist)
	0–3	20:51 – H. Zetterberg (G. Landeskog, N. Kronwall)
	0–4	24:07 – E. Karlsson (D. Sedin, N. Bäckström) (PP)
M. Židlický (P. Eliáš) – 28:12	1–4
J. Jágr (T. Plekanec, T. Kaberle) – 30:01	2–4

10 min
Penalties
10 min
29
Shots
25

14 February 2014; 12:00	Czech Republic	4–2 (2–1, 2–1, 0–0)	Latvia	Bolshoy Ice Dome, Sochi; Attendance: 5,831

Game reference

Ondřej Pavelec
Goalies
Edgars Masaļskis
Referees:
(United States) Tim Peel
(Finland) Jyri Rönn
Linesmen:
(Germany) André Schrader
(Canada) Mark Wheler

M. Erat (D. Krejčí, A. Hemský) – 10:10	1–0
	1–1	13:05 – J. Sprukts (K. Rēdlihs, L. Dārziņš) (PP)
J. Jágr (M. Židlický, T. Plekanec) (PP) – 19:29	2–1
	2–2	22:45 – H. Vasiļjevs (G. Pujacs)
J. Voráček (Z. Michálek) – 27:06	3–2
M. Židlický (M. Hanzal, P. Nedvěd) – 37:02	4–2

8 min
Penalties
8 min
39
Shots
20

15 February 2014; 21:00	Switzerland	1–0 (1–0, 0–0, 0–0)	Czech Republic	Bolshoy Ice Dome, Sochi; Attendance: 10,253

Game reference
Jonas Hiller	Goalies	Ondřej Pavelec	Referees: (Germany) Daniel Piechaczek (Canada) Kevin Pollock; Linesmen: (Canada) Brad Kovachik (United States) Chris Woodworth
S. Bodenmann (D. Hollenstein, K. Romy) – 14:10 / 1–0			Referees: (Germany) Daniel Piechaczek (Canada) Kevin Pollock; Linesmen: (Canada) Brad Kovachik (United States) Chris Woodworth
10 min	Penalties	6 min	Referees: (Germany) Daniel Piechaczek (Canada) Kevin Pollock; Linesmen: (Canada) Brad Kovachik (United States) Chris Woodworth
26	Shots	26	Referees: (Germany) Daniel Piechaczek (Canada) Kevin Pollock; Linesmen: (Canada) Brad Kovachik (United States) Chris Woodworth

Qualification playoffs

18 February 2014; 21:00	Czech Republic	5–3 (3–0, 1–1, 1–2)	Slovakia	Shayba Arena, Sochi; Attendance: 3,628

Game reference

Ondřej Pavelec
Goalies
Ján Laco
Referees:
(United States) Tim Peel
(Sweden) Marcus Vinnerborg
Linesmen:
(Canada) Lonnie Cameron
(Finland) Sakari Suominen

A. Hemský (T. Kaberle, J. Voráček) (PP) – 6:53	1–0
R. Červenka (J. Jágr, T. Plekanec) – 7:22	2–0
D. Krejčí (T. Kaberle) (PP) – 17:03	3–0
R. Červenka – 35:41	4–0
	4–1	38:57 – Mari. Hossa (A. Sekera, M. Handzuš)
	4–2	47:20 – Mari. Hossa (T. Tatar, M. Handzuš)
	4–3	48:51 – T. Surový (A. Sekera, M. Bartovič)
T. Plekanec (D. Krejčí, M. Židlický) (PP) (EN) – 59:21	5–3

2 min
Penalties
10 min
29
Shots
32

Quarterfinals

19 February 2014; 21:00	United States	5–2 (3–1, 1–0, 1–1)	Czech Republic	Shayba Arena, Sochi; Attendance: 4,606

Game reference

Jonathan Quick
Goalies
Ondřej Pavelec (out 29:31)
Alexander Salák (in 29:31)
Referees:
(Russia) Konstantin Olenin
(Canada) Kevin Pollock
Linesmen:
(Canada) Derek Amell
(Belarus) Ivan Dedioulia

J. van Riemsdyk (R. Kesler, P. Kane) – 1:39	1–0
	1–1	4:31 – A. Hemský
D. Brown (D. Backes, R. Suter) – 14:38	2–1
D. Backes (R. Suter, R. McDonagh) – 19:58	3–1
Z. Parise (J. Pavelski, R. Suter) (PP) – 29:31	4–1
P. Kessel (R. Kesler, K. Shattenkirk) – 42:01	5–1
	5–2	53:00 – A. Hemský

2 min
Penalties
6 min
25
Shots
23

== Luge ==
Athlete	Event	Run 1		Run 2		Run 3		Run 4		Total	
Athlete	Event	Time	Rank	Time	Rank	Time	Rank	Time	Rank	Time	Rank
Ondřej Hyman	Men's singles	53.222	24	53.145	25	52.783	26	52.708	26	3:31.858	25
Antonín Brož; Lukáš Brož	Men's doubles	50.665	15	50.387	11	—N/a				1:41.052	13
Vendula Kotenová	Women's singles	51.760	25	51.492	24	51.856	26	51.567	24	3:26.675	24
Antonín Brož; Lukáš Brož; Ondřej Hyman; Vendula Kotenová	Mixed team relay	55.600	9	56.926	11	57.279	8	—N/a		2:49.805	9

== Nordic combined ==
Czech Republic qualified a total of four athletes and a spot in the team relay.

Athlete	Event	Ski jumping			Cross-country		Total	
Athlete	Event	Distance	Points	Rank	Time	Rank	Time	Rank
Pavel Churavý	Normal hill/10 km	96.5	114.9	22	24:26.1	27	25:32.1	23
Pavel Churavý	Large hill/10 km	123.0	103.6	24	24:10.0	32	25:52.0	32
Miroslav Dvořák	Normal hill/10 km	89.5	101.8	44	23:59.6	18	25:58.6	29
Miroslav Dvořák	Large hill/10 km	125.0	104.2	22	22:21.1	1	24:00.1	11
Tomáš Portyk	Normal hill/10 km	97.5	119.8	13	25:30.2	36	26:17.2	32
Tomáš Portyk	Large hill/10 km	120.5	101.0	26	24:01.8	25	24:59.8	25
Tomáš Slavík	Normal hill/10 km	94.0	108.1	33	24:09.4	22	25:43.4	25
Tomáš Slavík	Large hill/10 km	120.5	101.0	26	23:44.2	29	25:36.2	29
Pavel Churavý; Miroslav Dvořák; Tomáš Portyk; Tomáš Slavík	Team large hill/4×5 km	493.0	440.0	5	48:40.1	8	49:36.1	7

== Short track speed skating ==
Czech Republic qualified 1 man (1500 m) and 1 woman (1000 m, 1500 m) for the Olympics during World Cup 3 and 4 in November 2013.

Men

Athlete	Event	Heat		Semifinal		Final	
Athlete	Event	Time	Rank	Time	Rank	Time	Rank
Vojtěch Loudín	1500 m	2:14.906	5	Did not advance			26

Women

Athlete	Event	Heat		Quarterfinal		Semifinal		Final	
Athlete	Event	Time	Rank	Time	Rank	Time	Rank	Time	Rank
Kateřina Novotná	1000 m	PEN		did not advance					
Kateřina Novotná	1500 m	2:27.232	6	—N/a		Did not advance			31

Qualification legend: ADV – Advanced due to being impeded by another skater; FA – Qualify to medal round; FB – Qualify to consolation round

== Ski jumping ==
Czech Republic received the following start quotas:

Athlete	Event	Qualification			First round			Final			Total	
Athlete	Event	Distance	Points	Rank	Distance	Points	Rank	Distance	Points	Rank	Points	Rank
Antonín Hájek	Men's large hill	117.0	91.8	34 Q	128.0	113.6	28 Q	124.5	112.1	28	225.7	28
Lukáš Hlava	Men's normal hill	92.5	108.7	24 Q	91.5	105.7	46	Did not advance				
Jakub Janda	Men's normal hill	98.5	117.0	10 Q	98.5	125.2	17 Q	96.5	118.6	21	243.8	19
Jakub Janda	Men's large hill	124.5	113.6	10 Q	127.0	115.3	27 Q	126.0	116.3	27	231.6	27
Roman Koudelka	Men's normal hill	99.5	121.3	6 Q	98.5	122.5	24 Q	99.5	124.3	13	246.8	16
Roman Koudelka	Men's large hill	120.0	104.6	20 Q	128.0	119.1	21 Q	125.5	124.4	14	243.5	19
Jan Matura	Men's normal hill	97.0	118.5	8 Q	96.5	123.9	18 Q	95.5	115.6	25	239.5	23
Jan Matura	Men's large hill	120.5	106.4	17 Q	131.0	125.6	11 Q	121.0	119.2	22	244.8	18
Antonín Hájek; Jakub Janda; Roman Koudelka; Jan Matura	Men's team large hill	—N/a			504.0	476.0	7 Q	516.5	491.8	7	967.8	7

== Snowboarding ==
Czech Republic qualified six quota places in the following events:

Alpine

Athlete	Event	Qualification		Round of 16	Quarterfinal	Semifinal	Final	
Athlete	Event	Time	Rank	Opposition Time	Opposition Time	Opposition Time	Opposition Time	Rank
Ester Ledecká	Women's giant slalom	1:49.17	10 Q	Riegler (AUT); W −0.49	Kummer (SUI); L +0.30	Did not advance		
Ester Ledecká	Women's slalom	1:03.74	2 Q	Soboleva (RUS); W −0.18	Karstens (GER); L +0.30	Did not advance		

Freestyle

Athlete	Event	Qualification				Semifinal				Final			
Athlete	Event	Run 1	Run 2	Best	Rank	Run 1	Run 2	Best	Rank	Run 1	Run 2	Best	Rank
Šárka Pančochová	Women's halfpipe	42.75	66.25	66.25	8 Q	34.00	31.50	34.00	9	Did not advance			
Šárka Pančochová	Women's slopestyle	77.75	33.75	77.75	5 QS	90.50	22.50	90.50	1 QF	86.25	20.00	86.25	5

Qualification Legend: QF – Qualify directly to final; QS – Qualify to semifinal

Snowboard cross

Athlete	Event	Seeding		Round of 16	Quarterfinal	Semifinal	Final	
Athlete	Event	Time	Rank	Position	Position	Position	Position	Rank
David Bakeš	Men's snowboard cross	CAN		4	Did not advance			=25
Emil Novák	Men's snowboard cross	CAN		4	Did not advance			=25
Eva Samková	Women's snowboard cross	1:20.61	1	—N/a	1 Q	1 FA	1	1st place, gold medalist(s)

Qualification legend: FA – Qualify to medal round; FB – Qualify to consolation round

== Speed skating ==
Based on the results from the fall World Cups during the 2013–14 ISU Speed Skating World Cup season, Czech Republic earned the following start quotas:

Women

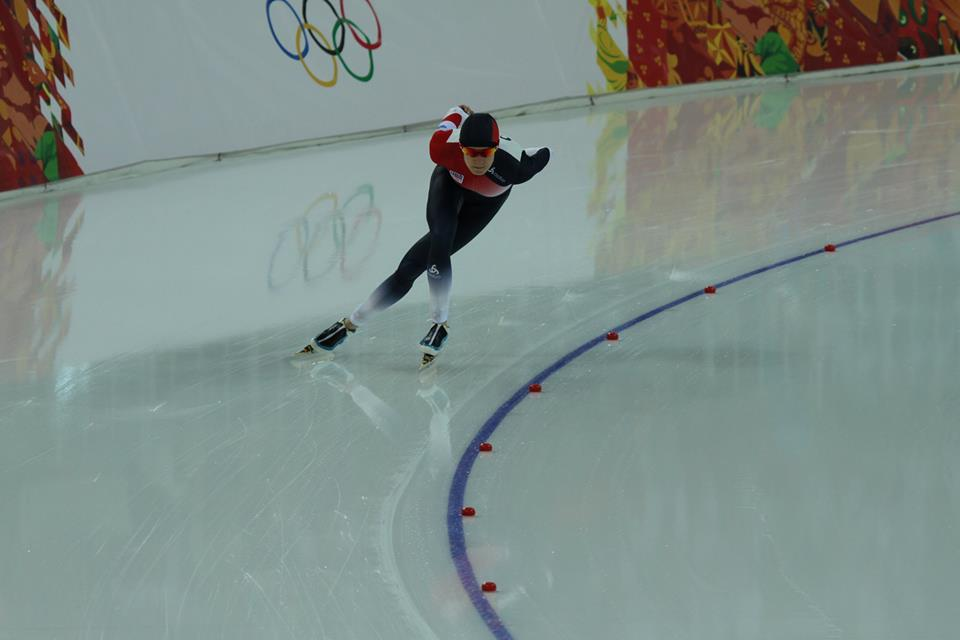
Martina Sáblíková won silver in the 3000 m.

Athlete	Event	Race 1		Race 2		Final	
Athlete	Event	Time	Rank	Time	Rank	Time	Rank
Karolína Erbanová	500 m	38.23	9	38.62	13	76.86	10
Karolína Erbanová	1000 m	—N/a				1:15.74	10
Karolína Erbanová	1500 m	—N/a				1:58.23	13
Martina Sáblíková	3000 m	—N/a				4:01.95	2nd place, silver medalist(s)
Martina Sáblíková	5000 m	—N/a				6:51.54	1st place, gold medalist(s)
