= Eugenio Claro =

Chilean alpine skier (born 1993)

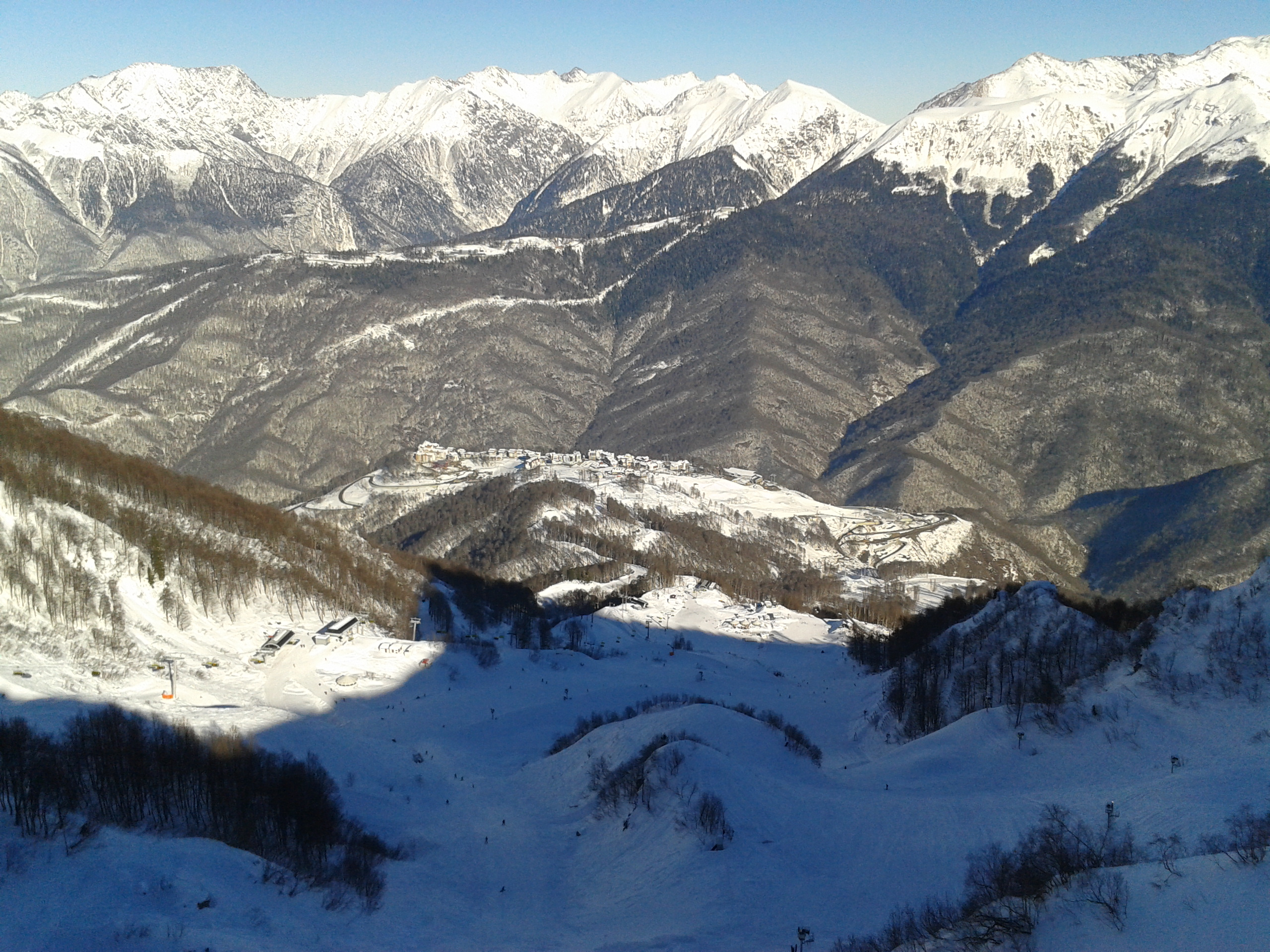
- Ski area resort Rosa Khutor in Krasnaya Polyana near Sochi.

Personal information
- Born: 23 September 1993 (age 32) Santiago, Chile
- Height: 1.75 m (5 ft 9 in)

Skiing career
- Sport: Alpine skiing ♂
- Club: Portillo
- Disciplines: Men's giant slalom Men's slalom Men's super-G
- World Cup debut: 8 December 2013 (age 20)

Olympics
- Teams: 1 – (2014)

World Championships
- Teams: 3 (2011, 2013, 2015)

Eugenio Claro (born September 23, 1993 in Santiago, Chile) is an alpine skier from Chile. Claro competed for Chile at the 2014 Winter Olympics in three alpine skiing events.

== Background ==
Claro started alpine skiing during his teens in 2006. Claro said the ski season in Chile is short, lasting three months. Most of the ski resorts are in the Andes and difficult to access, which makes the sport expensive for Chileans.

== World Cup results ==
=== Results per discipline ===
Discipline	WC starts	WC Top 30	WC Top 15	WC Top 5	WC Podium	Best result		
Discipline	WC starts	WC Top 30	WC Top 15	WC Top 5	WC Podium	Date	Location	Place
Slalom	0	0	0	0	0			
Giant slalom	1	0	0	0	0	8 December 2013	Beaver Creek, United States	DNF1
Super-G	0	0	0	0	0			
Downhill	0	0	0	0	0			
Combined	0	0	0	0	0			
Total	1	0	0	0	0			

- standings through 20 Jan 2019

== World Championship results ==
Year
Year	Age	Slalom	Giant; Slalom	Super G	Downhill	Combined	Team Event
2011	17	DNFQ2	DNF1	—	—	—	—
2013	19	—	46	—	—	—	—
2015	21	34	DNFQ1	DNF	—	—	—

== Olympic results ==
Year
Year	Age	Slalom	Giant; Slalom	Super G	Downhill	Combined
2014	20	DNF2	DNF1	45	—	—

== See also ==
- Alpine skiing at the 2014 Winter Olympics – Men's giant slalom
- Alpine skiing at the 2014 Winter Olympics – Men's slalom
- Alpine skiing at the 2014 Winter Olympics – Men's super-G
