= Virgile Vandeput =

Belgian-Israeli alpine skier (born 1994)

Personal information
- Native name: וירג'יל ואן דה פוט
- Born: 6 September 1994 (age 32) Anderlecht, Belgium
- Height: 1.85 m (6 ft 1 in)
- Weight: 79 kg (174 lb)

Virgile Vandeput (Hebrew: וירג'יל ואן דה פוט; born 6 September 1994) is a Belgian-Israeli alpine skier who competes for Israel.

== Biography ==
Born in Anderlecht, Belgium, he has dual Belgian and Israeli citizenship. He grew up representing Belgium and finished the 2009/10 season as the best ranked Belgian junior in Slalom and super G, and second best in giant slalom. He opted to switch to represent Israel from 2010, because he felt he would have better opportunities to compete at the highest level.

Vandeput began skiing as a boy, and joined the Belgian French Ski Federation's [FFBS] perfection level group in September 2006. He has a training base in Tignes, France. Vandeput's hobbies are volleyball, football, fitness, reading, and films, and his coach is Aleksander Vitanov.

During the 2014 Winter Olympics, Vandeput was supposed to compete for Israel at the 2014 Winter Olympics in the slalom and giant slalom. However, he suffered an ankle injury during training and failed a fitness test, and this prevented him from competing.

== See also ==
- Israel at the 2014 Winter Olympics
- List of select Jewish skiers
