= Einar Kristgeirsson =

Icelandic alpine skier (born 1994)

Personal information
- Born: 3 January 1994 (age 32) Keflavik, Iceland
Medal record
Alpine skiing
Representing Iceland

Einar Kristgeirsson (born 3 January 1994 in Keflavik, Iceland) is an alpine skier from Iceland. He competed for Iceland at the 2014 Winter Olympics in the slalom and giant slalom.

== See also ==
- Iceland at the 2014 Winter Olympics
