= Pavel Trikhichev =

Russian alpine skier (born 1992)

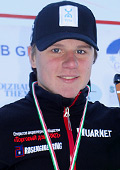

Personal information
- Born: 7 November 1992 (age 33) Monchegorsk, Murmansk Oblast, Russia
- Height: 1.77 m (5 ft 10 in)

Skiing career
- Sport: Alpine skiing
- Disciplines: Giant slalom, slalom, combined, Super G
- World Cup debut: 9 March 2013 (age 20)

Olympics
- Teams: 1 – (2014)
- Medals: 0

World Championships
- Teams: 3 – (2013, 2015, 2017)
- Medals: 0

World Cup
- Wins: 0
- Podiums: 1
- Overall titles: 0
- Discipline titles: 0

Pavel Sergeevich Trikhichev (Russian: Павел Сергеевич Трихичев; born November 7, 1992) is a Russian World Cup alpine ski racer. He competed in the 2014 Winter Olympics in Sochi, and in three World Championships.

== World Cup results ==
=== Season standings ===
Season	Age	Overall	Slalom	Giant slalom	Super-G	Downhill	Combined
2014	21	145	—	52	—	—	—
2015	22	130	47	—	—	—	41
2016	23	—	—	—	—	—	—
2017	24	—	—	—	—	—	—
2018	25	50	41	42	—	—	6

- Standings through 28 January 2018

=== Race podiums ===
- 0 wins
- 1 podium – (1 SC)

Season	Date	Location	Discipline	Position
2018	12 Jan 2018	Wengen, Switzerland	Super combined	2nd

== World Championships results ==
Year	Age	Slalom	Giant slalom	Super-G	Downhill	Combined
2013	20	—	27	—	—	—
2015	22	DNF1	DNF1	31	—	24
2017	24	DNF2	DNF1	35	—	18

== Olympic results ==
Year	Age	Slalom	Giant slalom	Super-G	Downhill	Combined
2014	22	33	DNF1	26	—	24
