= Arman Serebrakian =

Armenian alpine skier (born 1987)

Arman T. Serebrakian
Personal information
- Nationality: Armenian
- Born: 9 April 1987 (age 39) California, United States

Sport
- Sport: Alpine skiing

Arman T. Serebrakian (born 9 April 1987) is an Armenian alpine skier. He was born in California, United States. He competed at the 2014 Winter Olympics in Sochi, in giant slalom and slalom for Armenia, and was the flag bearer for Armenia during the Sochi Olympics closing ceremonies.
