= Mārtiņš Onskulis =

Latvian alpine skier (born 1994)

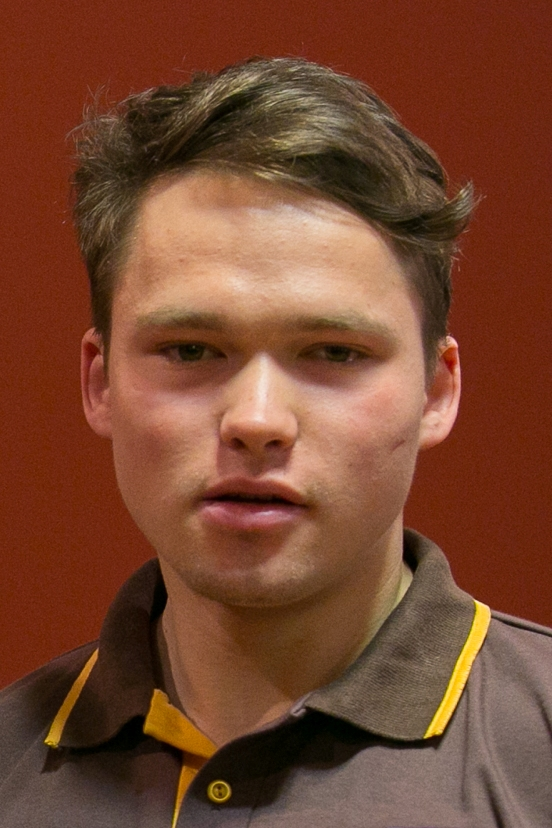
- Mārtiņš Onskulis in 2014

Personal information
- Nationality: Latvian
- Born: 18 June 1994 (age 30); Sigulda

Sport
- Sport: Alpine skiing

Mārtiņš Onskulis (born 18 June 1994) is a Latvian alpine skier. He was born in Sigulda. He competed at the 2014 Winter Olympics in Sochi, in giant slalom and slalom.
