= Alex Puente =

Spanish alpine skier (born 1994)

Personal information
- Full name: Alejandro Puente Tasias
- Born: 8 March 1994 (age 32) Barcelona, Spain
- Height: 182 cm (6 ft 0 in)
- Weight: 79 kg (174 lb)

Sport
- Country: Spain
- Sport: Alpine skiing

Alejandro Puente Tasias (Note: In this Spanish name, the first or paternal surname is Puente and the second or maternal family name is Tasias.) (born 8 March 1994) is an alpine skier from Spain. He competed for Spain at the 2014 Winter Olympics in the slalom and giant slalom. He currently skis for the Westminster Griffins ski team based in Salt Lake City, Utah. Recently, he competed in the FCExcavation Jackson Hole Downhill, which ended up getting cancelled, but won the training run over legends such as Ted Ligety and Marco Sullivan.

== Olympic results ==
Season	Date	Location	Discipline	Place
2014	19 February 2014	Sochi, Russia	Giant Slalom	DNF1
2014	22 February 2014	Sochi, Russia	Slalom	32
