= Brynjar Guðmundsson =

Icelandic alpine skier (born 1989)

Personal information
- Born: 10 March 1989 (age 37) Reykjavík, Iceland
Medal record
Alpine skiing
Representing Iceland

Brynjar Jökull Guðmundsson (born 10 March 1989 in Reykjavík) is an alpine skier from Iceland. Brynjar is due to compete for Iceland at the 2014 Winter Olympics in the slalom and giant slalom.

== See also ==
- Iceland at the 2014 Winter Olympics WM 2011 Garmis WM 2013 Schaldming
