= Adam Barwood =

New Zealand alpine skier (born 1992)

Personal information
- Born: 30 July 1992 (age 33) Queenstown, New Zealand
- Height: 185 cm (6 ft 1 in)

Sport
- Country: New Zealand
- Sport: Alpine skiing

Adam Barwood (born 30 July 1992, in Queenstown, New Zealand) is an alpine skier from New Zealand. He competed for New Zealand at the 2014 Winter Olympics in the slalom and giant slalom. Adam's career in ski racing began at Coronet Peak in 2001 with a school holiday programme learning to ski and weekends, to where he now a full-time athlete. He has also spent time training at Cardrona and Treble Cone. Since 2004, summers have been spent in the northern hemisphere continuing the training in Europe, Canada and the USA. Adam participated in the Olympics in Sochi, Russia February 2014 in slalom (placing 25th) and giant slalom (44th).

Adam has been a member of the New Zealand National Alpine Ski Team since 2010 and has won the Overall NZ Alpine Champion trophy 2012 and 2013; open slalom champion 2012, 2013; open giant slalom champion 2013.
