= Vasyl Telychuk =

Ukrainian alpine skier (born 1992)

Personal information
- Full name: Vasyl Telychuk
- Born: 13 March 1992 (age 34) Ukraine

Sport
- Sport: Skiing
- Updated on 15 February 2013

Vasyl Telychuk (born 13 March 1992) is an alpine skier from Ukraine.

== Performances ==
Level	Year	Event	SL	GS	SG	DH	SC	T
AWSC	2011	Garmisch-Partenkirchen, Germany	BDNF1	87				
JWSC	2012	Roccaraso, Italy	42	67	63	47	13	
AWSC	2013	Schladming, Austria	BDNF2	56				
