= Zhang Yuxin =

Chinese alpine skier (born 1989)

Personal information
- Born: February 20, 1989 (age 37) Heilongjiang, China
Medal record
Alpine skiing
Representing China

Zhang Yuxin (born February 20, 1989, in Heilongjiang, China) is an alpine skier from China. He competed for China at the 2014 Winter Olympics in the slalom and giant slalom.
