= Stefan Prisadov =

Bulgarian alpine skier (born 1990)

Personal information
- Born: 13 October 1990 (age 35) Smolyan, Bulgaria
Medal record
Alpine skiing
Representing Bulgaria

Stefan Prisadov (born 13 October 1990 in Smolyan, Bulgaria) is an alpine skier from Bulgaria. He competed for Bulgaria at the 2014 Winter Olympics in the slalom and giant slalom.
