= Alexandre Mohbat =

Lebanese alpine skier (born 1995)

Personal information
- Born: 16 May 1995 (age 31) Beirut, Lebanon
- Height: 1.84 m (6 ft 0 in)
- Weight: 76 kg (168 lb)

Sport
- Country: Lebanon
- Sport: Alpine skiing

Alexandre Mohbat (born 16 May 1995 in Beirut) is an alpine skier from Lebanon. He competed for Lebanon at the 2014 Winter Olympics in the slalom and giant slalom.

He competed at the 2012 Winter Youth Olympics in Innsbruck where his best result was 28th position in the boys' slalom race. Mohbat has also skied collegiately at Saint Michael's College in Colchester, Vermont.

== See also ==
- Lebanon at the 2014 Winter Olympics
