= Artem Voronov =

Uzbekistani alpine skier (born 1993)

Personal information
- Born: 26 March 1993 (age 33) Tashkent, Uzbekistan

Sport
- Country: Uzbekistan
- Sport: Alpine skiing

Artem Voronov (born 26 March 1993) is an alpine skier from Uzbekistan. He will compete for Uzbekistan at the 2014 Winter Olympics in the slalom and giant slalom.
