= Marko Rudić =

Bosnia and Herzegovina alpine skier (born 1990)

Marko Rudić (born 17 January 1990) is an alpine skier from Bosnia and Herzegovina. He competed for Bosnia and Herzegovina at the 2010 Winter Olympics. His best result was a 36th place in the slalom. In the 2014 Winter Olympics, he participated in slalom, but did not finish, and in giant slalom where he finished 49th. He was ranked in the top 200 skiers in the World, discipline slalom. Multiple times National winner in both technical disciplines, he is one of the most decorated and successful skiers in Bosnia and Herzegovina. He is currently working as a head Coach of National Ski Team Hong Kong China.
