= Conor Lyne =

Irish alpine skier (born 1993)

Personal information
- Nationality: Irish
- Born: 24 February 1993 (age 33) Reading, United Kingdom

Sport
- Country: Ireland
- Sport: Alpine skiing

Conor Lyne (born 24 February 1993 in Reading, United Kingdom) is an alpine skier from Ireland. He competed for Ireland at the 2014 Winter Olympics in the slalom and giant slalom.

Lyne lives in Utah.

== See also ==
- Ireland at the 2014 Winter Olympics
