= Steve Missillier =

French alpine skier (born 1984)

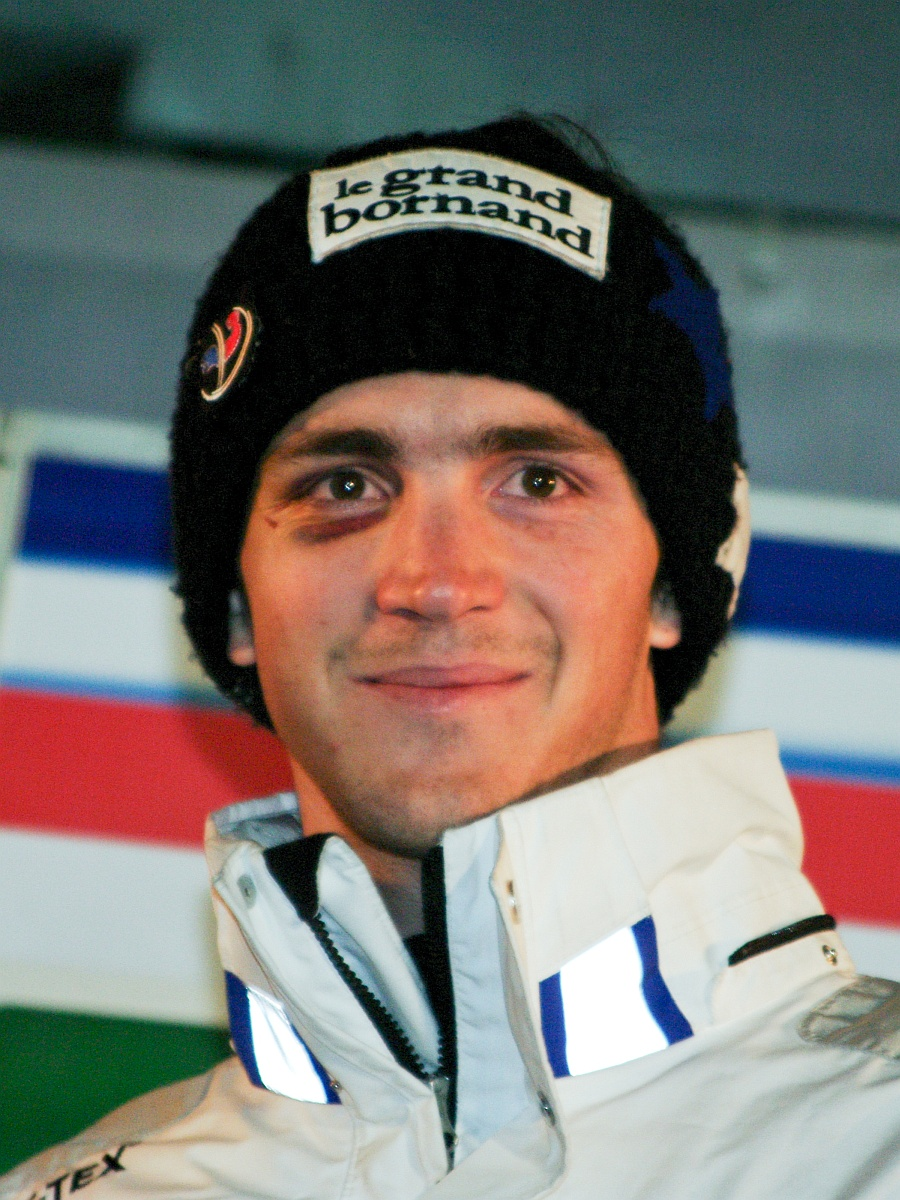

Personal information
- Nationality: French
- Born: 12 December 1984 (age 41) Annecy, France

Sport
- Sport: Alpine skiing
Medal record
Representing France
Men's alpine skiing
Olympic Games
Silver medal – second place	2014 Sochi	Giant slalom

Steve Missillier (born 12 December 1984) is a French alpine skier and non-commissioned officer. Missillier represented France at the 2010 Winter Olympics in Vancouver, and won a silver medal in giant slalom at the 2014 Winter Olympics in Sochi.
