= Park Je-yun =

South Korean alpine skier (born 1994)

Personal information
- Born: December 30, 1994 (age 31) Gangwon, South Korea
- Height: 1.75 m (5 ft 9 in)
- Weight: 70 kg (154 lb)

Sport

Korean name
- Hangul: 박제윤
- RR: Bak Jeyun
- MR: Pak Cheyun

Park Je-yun (Korean: 박제윤, born December 30, 1994 in Gangwon, South Korea) is an alpine skier from South Korea. He competed for South Korea at the 2014 Winter Olympics in the alpine skiing events.
