= Norbert Farkas (alpine skier) =

Hungarian alpine skier

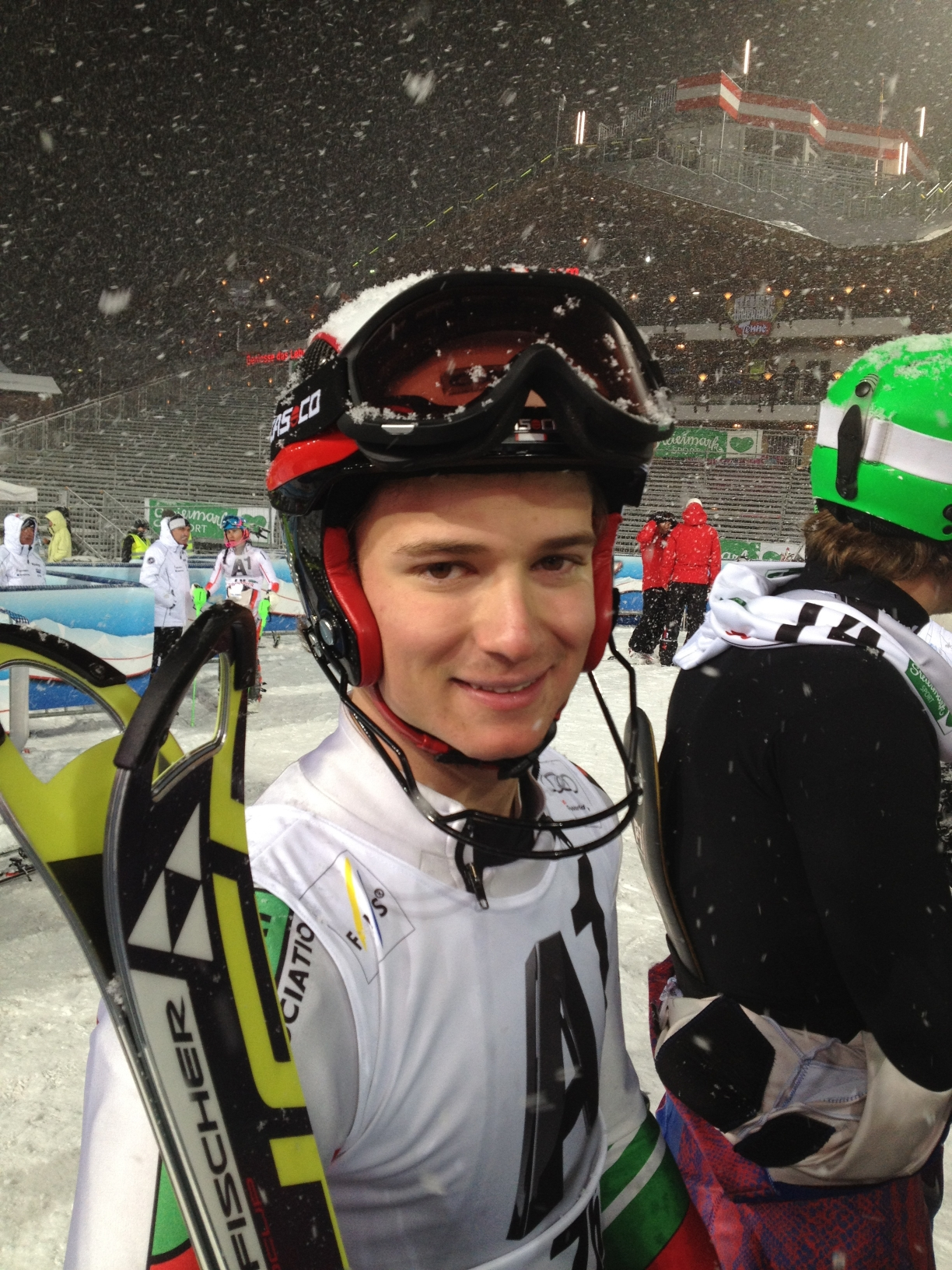

Personal information
- Born: 7 April 1992 (age 34) Budapest, Hungary
- Height: 1.68 m (5 ft 6 in)
- Website: Official website

Skiing career
- Sport: Alpine skiing
- Disciplines: Slalom, giant slalom, super-G, Super Combined
- World Cup debut: 24 Januar 2012 (age 19)

Olympics
- Teams: Hungary

Norbert Farkas (born 7 April 1992 in Budapest) is an alpine skier from Hungary. He competed for Hungary at the 2014 Winter Olympics in the slalom and giant slalom. He is 11-time Hungarian National Champion, 28-time Hungarian National Junior Champion. A team member of Felix Promotion sport-management agency. He learned to ski at the age of three. He has been studying International Business at Budapest University of Technology and Economics and was granted "A Good Student, a Good Athlete" award in 2013. Coaches are: Armin Brunner, Budai Balázs and Zakariás Zsolt. His role model is Felix Neureuther.

== FIS World Ski Championship participation ==
| Race date | Place | Country | Category | Discipline | Position | Points |
|---|---|---|---|---|---|---|
| 15.02.2013 | Schladming | Austria | FIS World Ski Championships | Giant slalom | 47 | 111.28 |
| 18.02.2011 | Garmisch-Partenkirchen | Germany | FIS World Ski Championships | Giant slalom | 63 | |
| 13.02.2009 | Val-d'Isère | France | FIS World Ski Championships | Giant slalom | BDNF1 | |

== Competitive History (Notable results) ==
=== 2007/2008 ===
- Hungarian University Race, giant slalom: 47th place (the best Hungarian)
- FIS points at the end of the season:
  - 93.30 point in Slalom – (5th best Hungarian)
  - 93.95 point in giant slalom (2nd best Hungarian)
  - 115.21 point in Super Giant slalom (2nd best Hungarian)

=== 2008/2009 ===
- FIS Junior World Ski Championship (Garmisch-Partenkirchen, Slalom: 53rd place, 2nd place in Junior I. category
- European Youth Olympic Festival (Szczyrk), Slalom: 34th place (the best Hungarian)
- FIS World Ski Championship (Val d’Isére): qualification races
- Hungarian University Race, giant slalom : 41st place (2nd best Hungarian)
- FIS points at the end of the season:
  - 76.79 point in Slalom (4th best Hungarian)
  - 79.65 point in giant slalom (3rd best Hungarian)
  - 123.60 point in Super Giant slalom (3rd best Hungarian)

=== 2009/2010 ===
- Member of the Hungarian Qualification Team for XXI. Winter Olympic Games (Vancouver)
- FIS Junior World Ski Championship, Slalom: 41st place (the best Hungarian)
- Hungarian National Championship, giant slalom: 2 gold medals
- Hungarian University Race, giant slalom: 33rd place (the best Hungarian)
- FIS points at the end of the season:
  - 62.01 point in Slalom (3rd best Hungarian)
  - 74.20 point in giant slalom (the best Hungarian)
  - 88.68 point in Super Giant slalom (the best Hungarian)

=== 2010/2011 ===
- FIS Junior World Ski Championship (Crans Montana), giant slalom: 63rd place (the best Hungarian)
- FIS World Championship (Garmisch-Partenkirchen), giant slalom: qualified as 39th (the best Hungarian); race place: 63rd
- Hungarian National Championship, Slalom: gold and silver medals
- FIS points at the end of the season:
  - 59.92 point in Slalom (the best Hungarian)
  - 66.19 point in giant slalom (the best Hungarian)
  - 99.75 point in Super Giant slalom (the best Hungarian)
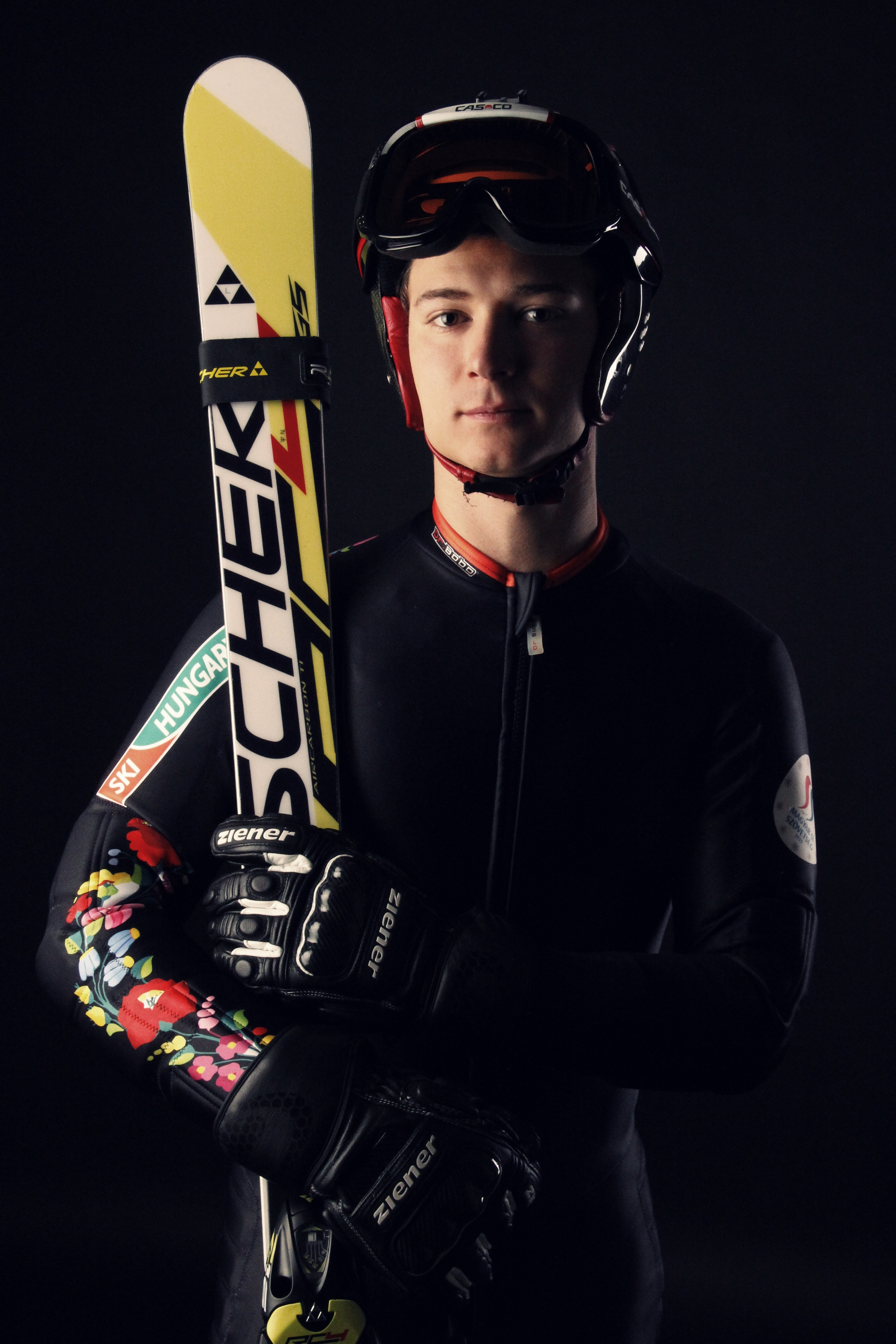
    Norbert Farkas alpine skier, curtsey of Adeloss Photography
  - 125.83 point in Super Combination (the best Hungarian)

=== 2011/2012 ===
- FIS World Cup (Schladming)
- Serbian International Competition (FIS Race ), giant slalom: 2nd place
- Hungarian National Championship: 1st in giant slalom, Slalom and Combination
- FIS points at the end of the season:
  - 52.32 point in Slalom (the best Hungarian)
  - 61.78 point in giant slalom (the best Hungarian)
  - 97.75 point in Super Giant slalom (the best Hungarian)

=== 2012/2013 ===
- Hungarian National Championship, Slalom: 1st place
- Hungarian National Championship, giant slalom: 1st place
- Junior Hungarian Championship, Slalom: 1st place
- Junior Hungarian Championship, giant slalom: 1st place
- FIS points at the end of the season:
  - 44.74 point in Slalom
  - 49.72 point in giant slalom
  - 112.22 point in Super Giant slalom

=== XXII Olympic Winter Games (Sochi) ===
Norbert Farkas represented Hungary on men's alpine skiing events (slalom and giant slalom) at the XXII Olympic Winter Games in Sochi.

- Giant slalom
  - BIB: 79
  - Run 1 rank: 55
  - Run 2 rank: 50
  - Final Rank: 50
- Slalom
  - BIB: 94
  - Run 1 rank: 58
  - Run 2 rank: DNF

== Sources ==
- Felix Promotion Athlete Profile
- FIS International Ski Fedatation Athlete Profile(biography, results and points)
- Hungarian Ski Association
