= Roberto Nani =

Italian alpine skier (born 1988)

Personal information
- Born: 14 December 1988 (age 37) Sondalo, Italy
- Height: 1.72 m (5 ft 8 in)
- Weight: 75 kg (165 lb)
Medal record
Alpine skiing
Representing Italy

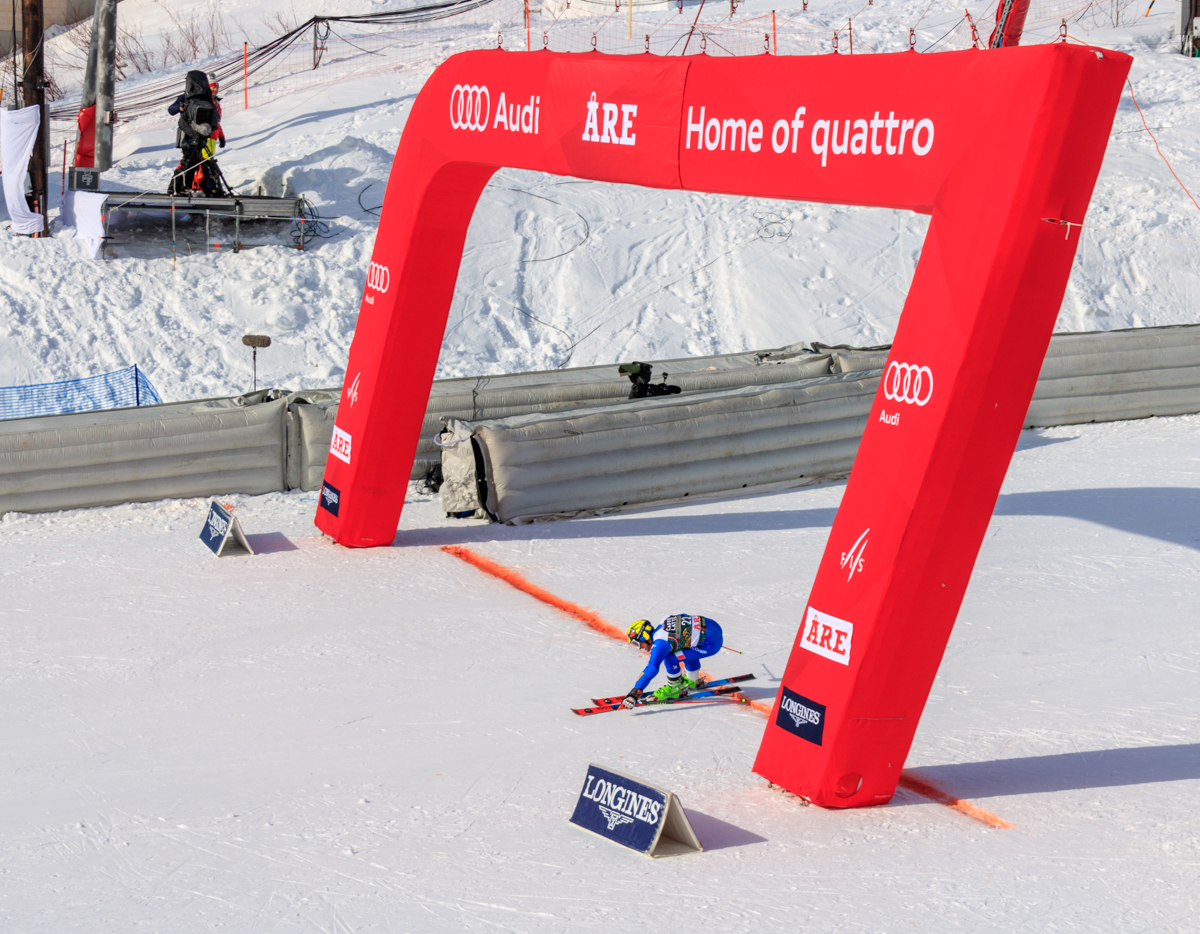
Alpine World Cup in Åre.jpg

Roberto Nani (born 14 December 1988 in Sondalo, Italy) is an Italian former alpine skier. He competed for Italy at the 2014 Winter Olympics in the alpine skiing events.

== Season standings ==
Season	Age	Overall	Slalom	Giant slalom	Super-G	Downhill	Combined
2012	23	123	46	—	—	—	—
2013	24	61	30	27	—	—	—
2014	25	37	—	8	—	—	—
2015	26	39	—	10	—	—	—
2016	27	53	—	11	—	—	—
2017	28	99	—	33	—	—	—
2018	29	73	—	21	—	—	—

- Standings through 28 January 2018
