= Ross Peraudo =

Australian alpine skier (born 1992)

Personal information
- Born: 7 November 1992 (age 33) Venaria Reale, Italy

Skiing career
- Country: Australia
- Sport: Alpine skiing
- Club: Perisher Winter Sports Club
- Disciplines: Slalom, Giant slalom
- World Cup debut: 8 December 2012

Olympics
- Teams: 1 – 2014
- Medals: 0

World Championships
- Teams: 2 – 2013, 2015
- Medals: 0

World Cup
- Seasons: 1 – 2013
- Wins: 0
- Podiums: 0

Ross Peraudo (born 7 November 1992 in Venaria Reale, Italy) is an alpine skier who competes for Australia. He competed for Australia at the 2014 Winter Olympics in the alpine skiing events.
