= Alexandru Barbu =

Romanian alpine skier (born 1987)

Personal information
- Born: 8 March 1987 (age 39) Sibiu, Romania

Sport
- Country: Romania
- Sport: Alpine skiing

Alexandru Barbu (born 8 March 1987) is a Romanian alpine skier. He competed for Romania at the 2014 Winter Olympics and 2018 Winter Olympics, in the slalom and giant slalom.
