= Alex Beniaidze =

Georgian alpine skier (born 1991)

Personal information
- Born: February 8, 1991 (age 35) Gudauri, Georgia

Sport
- Country: Georgia
- Sport: Alpine skiing

Alex Beniaidze (born February 8, 1991) is an alpine skier from Georgia. He competed for Georgia at the 2014 Winter Olympics in the giant slalom and the slalom.

Beniaidze currently resides in Bruneck, Italy.

== See also ==
- Georgia at the 2014 Winter Olympics
