= Warren Cummings Smith =

American-Estonian alpine skier

Trace Smith
Personal information
- Full name: Warren Cummings Smith III
- Nickname: Trace
- Nationality: American-Estonian
- Born: Warren Smith; 21 June 1992 (age 34) Boston, Massachusetts, U.S.
- Height: 1.89 m (6 ft 2 1/2 in)
- Weight: 92.98 kg (205.0 lb; 14.642 st)

Sport
- Country: Estonia
- Sport: Alpine Skiing, The Sphinx
- Event(s): Giant Slalom, Slalom
- College team: Dartmouth College Big Green
- Coached by: Bruce Knoepfel, James JJ Jensen, Peter Dodge, Ted Lockwood

Warren Cummings Smith III, also known as Trace Smith (born 21 June 1992), is an American-Estonian alpine skier who represented Estonia at the 2014 Winter Olympics. He is commonly referred to by the name Trace, alluding to the "III."

== Career ==
In December 2011, Smith obtained fifth place with 46.68 points in a FIS competition held in Val Saint Come, Canada. In December 2012, he got the 11th place after two runs in a FIS slalom competition held in Panorama, Canada. In December 2013, Smith became the first Estonian man to win the FIS competition in giant slalom held in Tärnaby, Sweden. In February 2013, Smith placed 36th in slalom at the FIS Alpine World Ski Championships 2013 in Schladming, Austria.

== Personal ==
Smith was born in Boston. His great-grandparents and grandmother were Estonian World War II refugees who emigrated to the United States. He holds both American and Estonian citizenship.

Smith attended Dartmouth College in Hanover, New Hampshire, where he majored in economics and government. He competed for the Dartmouth Big Green skiing and sailing teams before graduating in 2016. During his time at Dartmouth, Smith was renowned for his extravagant dance moves during "Tackies," a wacky party held every term by Kappa Delta Epsilon Sorority. Smith was himself a member of the Chi Heorot Fraternity for Gentlemen Athletes, which is known for fostering notable athletic alumni such as Nolan Kasper, Adam Nelson, Andrew Weibrecht, Lee Stempniak, Ben Lovejoy, and Matt Lindblad among others.

Prior to college, he attended Burke Mountain Academy, in East Burke, Vermont, the first sports academy in the country well known for its successful alumni such as Mikaela Shiffrin. Smith grew up racing at Stratton Mountain in Vermont as a member of the Stratton Training Center before attending Burke Mountain Academy. Smith previously sailed competitively for the Beverly Yacht Club in Marion, Massachusetts. He resides in Dedham, Massachusetts, with his father, mother and younger twin siblings.
