= Jorge Birkner Ketelhohn =

Argentine alpine skier (born 1990)

Jorge Birkner
Personal information
- Full name: Jorge Francisco Birkner Ketelhohn
- Born: 26 June 1990 (age 35) Buenos Aires, Argentina

Sport
- Country: Argentina
- Sport: Alpine skiing
- Club: Club Argentino de Ski

Jorge Francisco Birkner Ketelhohn (Note: In this Spanish name, the first or paternal surname is Birkner and the second or maternal family name is Ketelhohn.) (born 26 June 1990 in Buenos Aires, Argentina) is an alpine skier from Argentina. He will compete for Argentina at the 2014 Winter Olympics in all the alpine skiing events except the downhill.
