= Kostas Sykaras =

Greek alpine skier (born 1984)

Personal information
- Born: 30 May 1984 (age 42) Marousi, Greece
Medal record
Alpine skiing
Representing Greece

Kostas Sykaras (born 30 May 1984 in Marousi, Greece) is an alpine skier from Greece. He will compete for Greece at the 2014 Winter Olympics in three alpine skiing events.
