= Marko Vukićević =

Serbian alpine skier (born 1992)

Personal information
- Born: 27 October 1992 (age 33) Ljubljana, Slovenia
- Height: 1.85 m (6 ft 1 in)
- Weight: 91 kg (201 lb)

Marko Vukićević (Serbian Cyrillic: Марко Вукићевић, pronounced [mâːrko ʋukǐːtɕeʋitɕ]; born 27 October 1992 in Ljubljana, Slovenia) is an alpine skier competing for Serbia. He competed for Serbia at the 2014 Winter Olympics in the alpine skiing events. He originally represented Slovenia but switched to compete for Serbia in 2012 since he is of Serbian origin.
