= Klemen Kosi =

Slovenian alpine skier (born 1991)

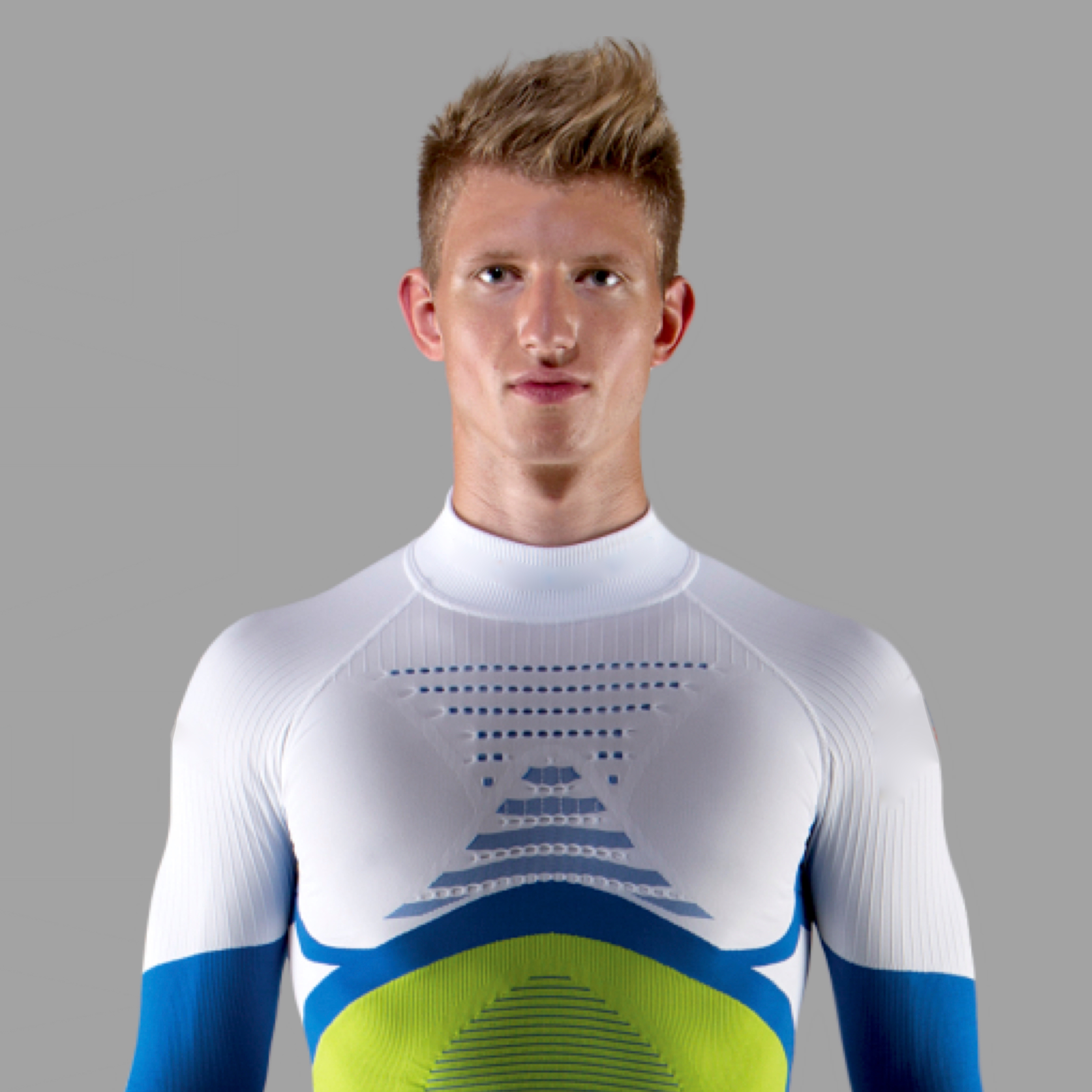

Personal information
- Born: 19 June 1991 (age 35) Maribor, Slovenia
- Height: 1.88 m (6 ft 2 in)

Skiing career
- Sport: Alpine skiing ♂
- Club: SK Branik Maribor
- Disciplines: Downhill, Super-G, Combined
- World Cup debut: 6 March 2011 (age 19)

Olympics
- Teams: 1 – (2014)

World Championships
- Teams: 2 – (2013, 2015)

World Cup
- Seasons: 5th (2011–2015)

Klemen Kosi (born 19 June 1991 in Maribor) is a World Cup alpine ski racer from Slovenia.

== Career ==
Kosi made his World Cup debut March 2011 in Kranjska Gora, Slovenia. He participated at the 2013 World Ski Championships, where his best result was a 12th place in super combined. Kosi represented Slovenia at the 2014 Winter Olympics, where he reached 24th place in downhill.
