= Massimiliano Valcareggi =

Greek alpine skier (born 1995)

Personal information
- Born: 12 February 1995 (age 31) Trieste, Italy

Sport
- Country: Greece
- Sport: Alpine skiing

Massimiliano Valcareggi (born 12 February 1995 in Trieste, Italy) is an alpine skier from Italy. He competed for Greece at the 2014 Winter Olympics in three alpine skiing events.

Although born in Italy, Valcareggi's mother is Greek, allowing him to compete for Greece. He chose to compete for Greece because he felt he had a better chance of making their national team.
