= Martin Vráblík =

Czech alpine skier (born 1982)

Martin Vráblík (Czech pronunciation: [ˈmarcɪn ˈvraːbliːk]; born 4 July 1982 in Vsetín) is a Czech alpine skier. Vráblík has appeared in the 2006 Winter Olympics and at the 2003, 2005 and 2007 World Championships. He has also appeared in some World Cup races, with negligible success.

== Career ==
=== Olympic Games ===
==== 2006 ====
- Slalom – 21st
- Giant slalom – DNF
- Super-G – 38th
- Combined – 12th

=== World Championship finishes ===
- 2005 – Men's slalom, 26th position
- 2003 – Men's downhill, 40th position

=== World Cup ===
He made his World Cup debut in 2004 in Wengen, and since this date his best result is 23rd, on 12 December 2008 in Val-d'Isère.
