= Alpine skiing at the 2018 Winter Olympics – Men's giant slalom =

Men's giant slalom at the XXIII Olympic Winter Games
- Alpine skiing
- Venue: Yongpyong Alpine Centre
- Date: 18 February 2018
- Competitors: 109 from 68 nations
- Winning time: 2:18.04

Medalists
1st place, gold medalist(s)		Marcel Hirscher	Austria
2nd place, silver medalist(s)		Henrik Kristoffersen	Norway
3rd place, bronze medalist(s)		Alexis Pinturault	France

The men's giant slalom competition of the PyeongChang 2018 Olympics was held on 18 February 2018 at the Yongpyong Alpine Centre at the Alpensia Sports Park in PyeongChang.

== Qualification ==
A total of up to 320 alpine skiers qualified across all eleven events. Athletes qualified for this event by having met the A qualification standard, which meant having 140 or less FIS Points and being ranked in the top 500 in the Olympic FIS points list or meeting the B standard, which meant 140 or less FIS points. Countries not meeting the A standard were allowed to enter a maximum of one B standard athlete per gender. The Points list takes into average the best results of athletes per discipline during the qualification period (1 July 2016 to 21 January 2018). Countries received additional quotas by having athletes ranked in the top 30 of the 2017–18 FIS Alpine Ski World Cup (two per gender maximum, overall across all events). After the distribution of B standard quotas (to nations competing only in the slalom and giant slalom events), the remaining quotas were distributed using the Olympic FIS Points list, with each athlete only counting once for qualification purposes. A country could only enter a maximum of four athletes for the event.

== Results ==
The race was started at 10:15 (Run 1) and 13:45 (Run 2).

Rank	Bib	Name	Nation	Run 1	Rank	Run 2	Rank	Total	Behind
1st place, gold medalist(s)	5	Marcel Hirscher	Austria	1:08.27	1	1:09.77	2	2:18.04	–
2nd place, silver medalist(s)	7	Henrik Kristoffersen	Norway	1:09.58	10	1:09.73	1	2:19.31	+1.27
3rd place, bronze medalist(s)	1	Alexis Pinturault	France	1:08.90	2	1:10.45	12	2:19.35	+1.31
4	12	Žan Kranjec	Slovenia	1:09.52	9	1:10.25	8	2:19.77	+1.73
5	11	Thomas Fanara	France	1:09.22	6	1:10.61	16	2:19.83	+1.79
6	10	Victor Muffat-Jeandet	France	1:09.44	8	1:10.41	10	2:19.85	+1.81
7	3	Mathieu Faivre	France	1:09.06	5	1:10.93	20	2:19.99	+1.95
8	13	Leif Kristian Nestvold-Haugen	Norway	1:08.93	3	1:11.30	25	2:20.23	+2.19
9	17	Loïc Meillard	Switzerland	1:09.77	12	1:10.68	17	2:20.45	+2.41
10	2	Matts Olsson	Sweden	1:09.31	7	1:11.39	27	2:20.70	+2.66
11	36	Ryan Cochran-Siegle	United States	1:10.75	21	1:09.99	3	2:20.74	+2.70
11	27	Erik Read	Canada	1:10.18	16	1:10.56	15	2:20.74	+2.70
13	14	Manfred Mölgg	Italy	1:10.03	15	1:11.01	21	2:21.04	+3.00
14	15	Florian Eisath	Italy	1:10.46	17	1:10.72	18	2:21.18	+3.14
15	19	Gino Caviezel	Switzerland	1:09.99	13	1:11.26	24	2:21.25	+3.21
15	9	Ted Ligety	United States	1:10.71	20	1:10.54	14	2:21.25	+3.21
17	32	Samu Torsti	Finland	1:10.93	22	1:10.44	11	2:21.37	+3.33
18	35	Phil Brown	Canada	1:11.30	25	1:10.38	9	2:21.51	+3.47
19	54	Luca Aerni	Switzerland	1:11.40	26	1:10.22	7	2:21.62	+3.58
20	22	Tommy Ford	United States	1:11.43	28	1:10.20	6	2:21.63	+3.59
21	42	Štefan Hadalin	Slovenia	1:11.53	29	1:10.13	4	2:21.66	+3.62
22	30	Linus Straßer	Germany	1:11.54	30	1:10.13	4	2:21.67	+3.63
23	21	André Myhrer	Sweden	1:09.60	11	1:12.09	28	2:21.69	+3.65
24	20	Filip Zubčić	Croatia	1:10.95	23	1:10.89	19	2:21.84	+3.80
25	33	Adam Žampa	Slovakia	1:11.40	26	1:10.46	13	2:21.86	+3.82
26	24	Fritz Dopfer	Germany	1:10.69	19	1:11.38	26	2:22.07	+4.03
27	28	Trevor Philp	Canada	1:11.13	24	1:11.25	23	2:22.55	+4.51
28	43	Albert Popov	Bulgaria	1:12.39	34	1:11.21	22	2:23.60	+5.56
29	41	James Crawford	Canada	1:11.74	31	1:12.38	30	2:24.12	+6.08
30	47	Tomoya Ishii	Japan	1:12.43	35	1:12.35	29	2:24.78	+6.74
31	63	Filip Forejtek	Czech Republic	1:12.91	36	1:13.16	32	2:26.07	+8.03
32	49	Sam Maes	Belgium	1:13.29	38	1:12.91	31	2:26.20	+8.16
33	40	Dominic Demschar	Australia	1:13.21	37	1:13.54	33	2:26.75	+8.71
34	38	Adam Barwood	New Zealand	1:13.41	40	1:13.81	35	2:27.22	+9.18
35	55	Kristaps Zvejnieks	Latvia	1:13.81	41	1:14.46	38	2:28.27	+10.23
36	34	Willis Feasey	New Zealand	1:14.48	42	1:13.80	34	2:28.28	+10.24
37	57	Samuel Kolega	Croatia	1:14.61	45	1:14.13	36	2:28.74	+10.70
38	68	Olivier Jenot	Monaco	1:14.93	48	1:14.16	37	2:29.09	+11.05
39	73	Kim Dong-woo	South Korea	1:14.49	43	1:15.56	41	2:30.05	+12.01
40	79	Tormis Laine	Estonia	1:15.70	50	1:15.18	39	2:30.88	+12.84
41	71	Marko Vukićević	Serbia	1:14.64	46	1:16.71	48	2:31.35	+13.31
42	80	Márton Kékesi	Hungary	1:16.64	53	1:15.22	40	2:31.86	+13.82
43	70	Simon Breitfuss Kammerlander	Bolivia	1:16.27	52	1:15.98	44	2:32.25	+14.21
44	62	Dalibor Šamšal	Hungary	1:16.09	51	1:16.79	50	2:32.88	+14.84
45	77	Marko Stevović	Serbia	1:17.42	57	1:15.79	42	2:33.21	+15.17
46	78	Ioannis Antoniou	Greece	1:17.38	56	1:15.92	43	2:33.30	+15.26
47	90	Erjon Tola	Albania	1:16.86	54	1:16.77	49	2:33.63	+15.59
48	81	Rodolfo Dickson	Mexico	1:17.02	55	1:16.67	47	2:33.69	+15.65
49	84	Itamar Biran	Israel	1:17.52	58	1:16.19	45	2:33.71	+15.67
50	65	Matej Falat	Slovakia	1:14.99	49	1:19.79	61	2:34.78	+16.74
51	75	Igor Zakurdayev	Kazakhstan	1:18.78	62	1:16.29	46	2:35.07	+17.03
52	91	Komiljon Tukhtaev	Uzbekistan	1:17.72	60	1:18.27	58	2:35.99	+17.95
53	60	Adam Lamhamedi	Morocco	1:18.50	61	1:17.54	54	2:36.04	+18.00
54	88	Yuri Danilochkin	Belarus	1:19.45	64	1:17.44	53	2:36.89	+18.85
55	82	Alexandru Barbu	Romania	1:19.74	66	1:17.40	52	2:37.14	+19.10
56	96	Albin Tahiri	Kosovo	1:19.49	65	1:17.98	55	2:37.47	+19.43
57	98	Ivan Kovbasnyuk	Ukraine	1:20.41	70	1:17.26	51	2:37.67	+19.63
58	89	Mohammad Kiyadarbandsari	Iran	1:19.11	63	1:18.61	59	2:37.72	+19.68
59	86	Andrej Drukarov	Lithuania	1:19.98	68	1:18.21	57	2:38.19	+20.15
60	76	Casper Dyrbye Næsted	Denmark	1:20.33	69	1:18.01	56	2:38.34	+20.30
61	97	Shannon-Ogbnai Abeda	Eritrea	1:19.86	67	1:20.01	62	2:39.87	+21.83
62	95	Matthieu Osch	Luxembourg	1:21.45	74	1:18.94	60	2:40.39	+22.35
63	92	Evgeniy Timofeev	Kyrgyzstan	1:20.90	72	1:20.13	63	2:41.03	+22.99
64	83	Eldar Salihović	Montenegro	1:20.51	71	1:20.72	64	2:41.23	+23.19
65	101	Alessandro Mariotti	San Marino	1:21.66	75	1:21.21	66	2:42.87	+24.83
66	99	Arthur Hanse	Portugal	1:22.43	76	1:21.52	67	2:43.95	+25.91
67	93	Serdar Deniz	Turkey	1:23.45	77	1:20.78	65	2:44.23	+26.19
68	108	Jeffrey Webb	Malaysia	1:23.83	78	1:23.84	70	2:47.67	+29.63
69	102	Zhang Yangming	China	1:25.73	79	1:22.95	69	2:48.68	+30.64
70	104	Asa Miller	Philippines	1:27.52	81	1:22.43	68	2:49.95	+31.91
71	103	Allen Behlok	Lebanon	1:26.70	80	1:25.43	71	2:52.13	+34.09
72	106	Muhammad Karim	Pakistan	1:27.53	82	1:26.51	72	2:54.04	+36.00
73	105	Charles Flaherty	Puerto Rico	1:28.50	83	1:27.55	73	2:56.05	+38.01
74	110	Kang Song-il	North Korea	1:32.03	84	1:29.99	74	3:02.02	+43.98
75	109	Choe Myong-gwang	North Korea	1:38.67	85	1:33.34	75	3:12.01	+53.97
	18	Riccardo Tonetti	Italy	1:09.02	4	DNF	—N/a		
	25	Stefan Brennsteiner	Austria	1:10.02	14	DNF	—N/a		
	29	Andreas Žampa	Slovakia	1:10.61	18	DNF	—N/a		
	46	Joan Verdú	Andorra	1:12.06	33	DNF	—N/a		
	51	Juan Del Campo	Spain	1:13.39	39	DNF	—N/a		
	69	Emir Lokmić	Bosnia and Herzegovina	1:14.55	44	DNF	—N/a		
	58	Kai Horwitz	Chile	1:14.88	47	DNF	—N/a		
	66	Kamen Zlatkov	Bulgaria	1:17.65	59	DNF	—N/a		
	74	Michael Poettoz	Colombia	1:21.41	73	DNF	—N/a		
	39	Kristoffer Jakobsen	Sweden	1:12.02	32	DNS	—N/a		
	6	Justin Murisier	Switzerland	DNF	—N/a				
	16	Aleksander Aamodt Kilde	Norway	DNF	—N/a				
	23	Alexander Schmid	Germany	DNF	—N/a				
	26	Tim Jitloff	United States	DNF	—N/a				
	31	Kjetil Jansrud	Norway	DNF	—N/a				
	37	Christian Hirschbühl	Austria	DNF	—N/a				
	48	Ivan Kuznetsov	Olympic Athletes from Russia	DNF	—N/a				
	50	Sebastiano Gastaldi	Argentina	DNF	—N/a				
	52	Jung Dong-hyun	South Korea	DNF	—N/a				
	53	Ondřej Berndt	Czech Republic	DNF	—N/a				
	56	Adam Kotzmann	Czech Republic	DNF	—N/a				
	59	Martin Čater	Slovenia	DNF	—N/a				
	61	Sturla Snær Snorrason	Iceland	DNF	—N/a				
	64	Jan Zabystřan	Czech Republic	DNF	—N/a				
	67	Michel Macedo	Brazil	DNF	—N/a				
	72	Iason Abramashvili	Georgia	DNF	—N/a				
	87	Antonio Ristevski	Macedonia	DNF	—N/a				
	94	Nicola Zanon	Thailand	DNF	—N/a				
	100	Dinos Lefkaritis	Cyprus	DNF	—N/a				
	107	Connor Wilson	South Africa	DNF	—N/a				
	4	Manuel Feller	Austria	DSQ	—N/a				
	8	Luca De Aliprandini	Italy	DSQ	—N/a				
	44	Harry Laidlaw	Australia	DSQ	—N/a				
	45	Miha Hrobat	Slovenia	DSQ	—N/a				
	85	Michał Jasiczek	Poland	DNS	—N/a				
