= Alpine skiing at the 2018 Winter Olympics – Men's slalom =

Men's slalom at the XXIII Olympic Winter Games
- Alpine skiing
- Venue: Yongpyong Alpine Centre, Pyeongchang, South Korea
- Date: 22 February 2018
- Competitors: 106 from 65 nations
- Winning time: 1:38.99

Medalists
1st place, gold medalist(s)		André Myhrer	Sweden
2nd place, silver medalist(s)		Ramon Zenhäusern	Switzerland
3rd place, bronze medalist(s)		Michael Matt	Austria

The men's slalom competition of the PyeongChang 2018 Olympics was held on 22 February 2018 at the Yongpyong Alpine Centre at the Alpensia Sports Park in PyeongChang.

== Qualification ==
Up to a total of 320 alpine skiers qualified across all eleven events. Athletes qualified for this event by having met the A qualification standard, which meant having 140 or less FIS Points and being ranked in the top 500 in the Olympic FIS points list or meeting the B standard, which meant 140 or less FIS points. Countries not meeting the A standard were allowed to enter a maximum of one B standard athlete per gender. The Points list takes into average the best results of athletes per discipline during the qualification period (1 July 2016 to 21 January 2018). Countries received additional quotas by having athletes ranked in the top 30 of the 2017–18 FIS Alpine Ski World Cup (two per gender maximum, overall across all events). After the distribution of B standard quotas (to nations competing only in the slalom and giant slalom events), the remaining quotas were distributed using the Olympic FIS Points list, with each athlete only counting once for qualification purposes. A country could only enter a maximum of four athletes for the event.

== Results ==
The race was started at 10:00 (Run 1) and 13:30 (Run 2).

Rank	Bib	Name	Nation	Run 1	Rank	Run 2	Rank	Total	Behind
1st place, gold medalist(s)	7	André Myhrer	Sweden	47.93	2	51.06	8	1:38.99	—
2nd place, silver medalist(s)	15	Ramon Zenhäusern	Switzerland	48.66	9	50.67	2	1:39.33	+0.34
3rd place, bronze medalist(s)	6	Michael Matt	Austria	49.00	12	50.66	1	1:39.66	+0.67
4	24	Clément Noël	France	48.58	7	51.12	10	1:39.70	+0.71
5	10	Alexis Pinturault	France	48.54	6	51.18	11	1:39.72	+0.73
6	16	Victor Muffat-Jeandet	France	48.34	3	51.41	14	1:39.75	+0.76
7	35	Kristoffer Jakobsen	Sweden	48.74	10	51.20	12	1:39.94	+0.95
8	1	Daniel Yule	Switzerland	48.88	11	51.24	13	1:40.12	+1.13
9	13	Dave Ryding	Great Britain	49.09	13	51.07	9	1:40.16	+1.17
10	8	Sebastian Foss-Solevåg	Norway	48.53	5	51.65	20	1:40.18	+1.19
11	9	Marco Schwarz	Austria	48.62	8	51.57	19	1:40.19	+1.20
12	2	Manfred Mölgg	Italy	48.40	4	51.84	23	1:40.24	+1.25
13	20	Leif Kristian Nestvold-Haugen	Norway	49.27	14	51.04	7	1:40.31	+1.32
14	22	Loïc Meillard	Switzerland	49.63	19	50.69	3	1:40.32	+1.33
15	12	Manuel Feller	Austria	49.35	16	51.03	6	1:40.38	+1.39
16	3	Stefano Gross	Italy	49.27	14	51.44	16	1:40.71	+1.72
17	21	Aleksandr Khoroshilov	Olympic Athletes from Russia	49.72	21	51.01	5	1:40.73	+1.74
18	26	David Chodounsky	United States	49.43	17	51.41	14	1:40.84	+1.85
19	11	Mattias Hargin	Sweden	49.71	20	51.51	18	1:41.22	+2.23
20	17	Fritz Dopfer	Germany	49.79	22	51.48	17	1:41.27	+2.28
21	44	Istok Rodeš	Croatia	49.60	18	51.81	22	1:41.41	+2.42
22	32	Phil Brown	Canada	50.22	26	51.72	21	1:41.94	+2.95
23	41	Elias Kolega	Croatia	51.18	29	50.94	4	1:42.12	+3.13
24	29	Adam Žampa	Slovakia	49.91	24	52.36	26	1:42.27	+3.28
25	49	Marco Pfiffner	Liechtenstein	51.09	28	52.22	24	1:43.31	+4.32
26	51	Laurie Taylor	Great Britain	51.08	27	52.33	25	1:43.41	+4.42
27	33	Jung Dong-hyun	South Korea	51.79	31	53.28	28	1:45.07	+6.08
28	74	Iason Abramashvili	Georgia	52.69	35	55.00	29	1:47.69	+8.70
29	25	Erik Read	Canada	49.81	23	58.74	34	1:48.55	+9.56
30	81	Márton Kékesi	Hungary	53.49	38	55.56	30	1:49.05	+10.06
31	31	Mark Engel	United States	56.18	43	53.13	27	1:49.31	+10.32
32	78	Simon Breitfuss Kammerlander	Bolivia	54.66	40	55.76	31	1:50.42	+11.43
33	85	Yuri Danilochkin	Belarus	55.42	41	56.73	32	1:52.15	+13.16
34	61	Mohammad Kiyadarbandsari	Iran	55.66	42	57.03	33	1:52.69	+13.70
35	57	Andreas Žampa	Slovakia	54.15	39	59.43	36	1:53.58	+14.59
36	95	Erjon Tola	Albania	58.00	45	59.06	35	1:57.06	+18.07
37	89	Michael Poettoz	Colombia	57.46	44	1:00.00	37	1:57.46	+18.47
38	94	Arthur Hanse	Portugal	58.26	46	1:00.35	38	1:58.61	+19.62
39	103	Albin Tahiri	Kosovo	1:00.80	48	1:02.13	39	2:02.93	+23.94
40	98	Evgeniy Timofeev	Kyrgyzstan	1:01.56	49	1:02.37	40	2:03.93	+24.94
41	88	Andrej Drukarov	Lithuania	59.40	47	1:07.77	42	2:07.17	+28.18
42	100	Ashot Karapetyan	Armenia	1:02.47	50	1:05.61	41	2:08.08	+29.09
43	108	Choe Myong-gwang	North Korea	1:09.42	51	1:13.39	43	2:22.81	+43.82
	4	Henrik Kristoffersen	Norway	47.72	1	DNF	—N/a		
	27	Naoki Yuasa	Japan	52.89	36	DNF	—N/a		
	34	Trevor Philp	Canada	49.95	25	DNF	—N/a		
	37	Nolan Kasper	United States	52.44	34	DNF	—N/a		
	40	Joaquim Salarich	Spain	52.07	33	DNF	—N/a		
	45	Matej Falat	Slovakia	51.86	32	DNF	—N/a		
	53	Michał Jasiczek	Poland	51.64	30	DNF	—N/a		
	54	Sam Maes	Belgium	52.90	37	DNF	—N/a		
	107	Kang Song-il	North Korea	1:11.43	52	DNF	—N/a		
	5	Marcel Hirscher	Austria	DNF	—N/a				
	14	Luca Aerni	Switzerland	DNF	—N/a				
	18	Jonathan Nordbotten	Norway	DNF	—N/a				
	19	Jean-Baptiste Grange	France	DNF	—N/a				
	23	Linus Straßer	Germany	DNF	—N/a				
	28	Štefan Hadalin	Slovenia	DNF	—N/a				
	30	Matej Vidović	Croatia	DNF	—N/a				
	36	Riccardo Tonetti	Italy	DNF	—N/a				
	38	Juan del Campo	Spain	DNF	—N/a				
	39	Kamen Zlatkov	Bulgaria	DNF	—N/a				
	42	Žan Kranjec	Slovenia	DNF	—N/a				
	43	Dalibor Šamšal	Hungary	DNF	—N/a				
	46	Alex Vinatzer	Italy	DNF	—N/a				
	47	Albert Popov	Bulgaria	DNF	—N/a				
	48	Filip Zubčić	Croatia	DNF	—N/a				
	50	Ondřej Berndt	Czech Republic	DNF	—N/a				
	52	Kristaps Zvejnieks	Latvia	DNF	—N/a				
	55	Adam Barwood	New Zealand	DNF	—N/a				
	56	Kai Alaerts	Belgium	DNF	—N/a				
	58	Emir Lokmić	Bosnia and Herzegovina	DNF	—N/a				
	59	Willis Feasey	New Zealand	DNF	—N/a				
	60	Filip Forejtek	Czech Republic	DNF	—N/a				
	62	Ioannis Antoniou	Greece	DNF	—N/a				
	63	Jan Zabystřan	Czech Republic	DNF	—N/a				
	64	Ivan Kuznetsov	Olympic Athletes from Russia	DNF	—N/a				
	65	Itamar Biran	Israel	DNF	—N/a				
	66	Dominic Demschar	Australia	DNF	—N/a				
	67	Marko Vukićević	Serbia	DNF	—N/a				
	68	Patrick Brachner	Azerbaijan	DNF	—N/a				
	69	Eldar Salihović	Montenegro	DNF	—N/a				
	71	Alexandru Barbu	Romania	DNF	—N/a				
	72	Antonio Ristevski	Macedonia	DNF	—N/a				
	73	Marko Stevović	Serbia	DNF	—N/a				
	75	Tormis Laine	Estonia	DNF	—N/a				
	76	Adam Lamhamedi	Morocco	DNF	—N/a				
	77	Kim Dong-woo	South Korea	DNF	—N/a				
	79	Kai Horwitz	Chile	DNF	—N/a				
	80	Igor Zakurdayev	Kazakhstan	DNF	—N/a				
	82	Michel Macedo	Brazil	DNF	—N/a				
	83	Adam Kotzmann	Czech Republic	DNF	—N/a				
	84	Casper Dyrbye Næsted	Denmark	DNF	—N/a				
	86	Matthieu Osch	Luxembourg	DNF	—N/a				
	87	Serdar Deniz	Turkey	DNF	—N/a				
	90	Rodolfo Dickson	Mexico	DNF	—N/a				
	91	Ivan Kovbasnyuk	Ukraine	DNF	—N/a				
	92	Dinos Lefkaritis	Cyprus	DNF	—N/a				
	96	Connor Wilson	South Africa	DNF	—N/a				
	97	Komiljon Tukhtaev	Uzbekistan	DNF	—N/a				
	99	Alessandro Mariotti	San Marino	DNF	—N/a				
	101	Shannon-Ogbnai Abeda	Eritrea	DNF	—N/a				
	102	Jeffrey Webb	Malaysia	DNF	—N/a				
	104	Yohan Goutt Gonçalves	Timor-Leste	DNF	—N/a				
	105	Allen Behlok	Lebanon	DNF	—N/a				
	106	Muhammad Karim	Pakistan	DNF	—N/a				
	70	Sturla Snær Snorrason	Iceland	DNS	—N/a				
	93	Nicola Zanon	Thailand	DNS	—N/a				
