= List of flag bearers for Kosovo at the Olympics =

Kosovo at the Olympics
- IOC code: KOS
- NOC: Olympic Committee of Kosovo
- Website: www.noc-kosovo.org (in Albanian and Serbian)
- Medals: Gold 3 Silver 1 Bronze 1 Total 5

Summer appearances
- 2016; 2020; 2024

Winter appearances
- 2018; 2022; 2026

Other related appearances
- Yugoslavia (1920–1992W); Independent Olympic Participants (1992S); Serbia and Montenegro (1996–2006); Serbia (2008–2012)

This is a list of flag bearers who have represented Kosovo at the Olympics.

Flag bearers carry the national flag of their country at the opening ceremony of the Olympic Games.

#	Event year	Season	Flag bearer	Sport	Ref.
1	2016	Summer	Majlinda Kelmendi	Judo	
2	2018	Winter	Albin Tahiri	Alpine skiing	
3	2020	Summer	Akil Gjakova	Judo	
3	2020	Summer	Majlinda Kelmendi	Judo	
4	2022	Winter	Kiana Kryeziu	Alpine skiing	
4	2022	Winter	Albin Tahiri	Alpine skiing	
5	2024	Summer	Akil Gjakova	Judo	
5	2024	Summer	Nora Gjakova	Judo	

== See also ==
- Kosovo at the Olympics
