= Alpine skiing at the 2015 Winter Universiade – Men's giant slalom =

The men's giant slalom competition of the 2015 Winter Universiade was held at Universiade slope, Sierra Nevada, Spain on February 12, 2015.

== Results ==
Rank	Bib	Name	Nation	Run 1	Rank	Run 2	Rank	Total	Behind
1st place, gold medalist(s)	36	Michelangelo Tentori	Italy	48.31	3	49.15	3	1:37.46	
2nd place, silver medalist(s)	7	Rocco Delsante	Italy	48.18	2	49.63	14	1:37.81	+0.35
3rd place, bronze medalist(s)	15	Jonas Fabre	France	47.68	1	50.32	22	1:38	+0.54
4	9	Robin Buffet	France	48.65	8	49.45	8	1:38.1	+0.64
5	11	Giulio Bosca	Italy	48.74	12	49.37	6	1:38.11	+0.65
6	4	Ramon Zenhäusern	Switzerland	49.34	20	48.82	1	1:38.16	+0.7
7	23	Alex Puente Tasias	Spain	48.65	8	49.61	12	1:38.26	+0.8
8	56	Axel Esteve	Andorra	48.73	11	49.62	13	1:38.35	+0.89
9	45	Pol Carreras	Spain	49.2	18	49.16	4	1:38.36	+0.9
10	18	Emil Johansson	Sweden	49.06	15	49.44	7	1:38.5	+1.04
11	14	Sandro Boner	Switzerland	49	13	49.54	11	1:38.54	+1.08
12	29	Marc Oliveras	Andorra	49.68	29	49.11	2	1:38.79	+1.33
13	43	Joel Müller	Switzerland	49.65	26	49.26	5	1:38.91	+1.45
14	1	Andraž Reich-Pogladič	Slovenia	48.44	6	50.51	24	1:38.95	+1.49
15	25	Sean Horner	United States	49.46	23	49.5	10	1:38.96	+1.5
16	8	Luca Riorda	Italy	49.11	16	49.95	19	1:39.06	+1.6
17	2	Max Marno	United States	48.37	4	50.78	27	1:39.15	+1.69
18	42	Maksim Stukov	Russia	49.4	21	49.76	16	1:39.16	+1.7
19	39	Kalle Peltola	Finland	49.75	30	49.47	9	1:39.22	+1.76
20	12	Bernhard Graf	Austria	49.44	22	49.81	18	1:39.25	+1.79
21	21	Vladislav Novikov	Russia	49.67	28	49.65	15	1:39.32	+1.86
22	13	Adam Zika	Czech Republic	49.65	26	49.78	17	1:39.43	+1.97
23	30	Jakob Špik	Slovenia	49.22	19	50.26	21	1:39.48	+2.02
24	17	Philippe Rivet	Canada	49.51	24	50.16	20	1:39.67	+2.21
25	3	Cedric Noger	Switzerland	48.41	5	51.63	35	1:40.04	+2.58
26	61	Vladimir Siráň	Slovakia	49.77	31	50.59	25	1:40.36	+2.9
27	20	Simon-Claude Toutant	Canada	49	13	51.5	32	1:40.5	+3.04
28	51	Dries van den Broecke	Belgium	50.3	43	50.33	23	1:40.63	+3.17
29	64	Josh Alayrach	Andorra	50.06	34	50.78	27	1;40.84	+3.38
30	65	Richard Leitgeb	Austria	50.24	40	50.76	26	1:41	+3.54
31	50	Bernhard Binderitsch	Austria	50.16	36	50.85	29	1:41.01	+3.55
32	72	Evgenij Pyasik	Russia	50.21	38	51.15	30	1:41.36	+3.9
33	75	Patrick Boner	Switzerland	50.09	35	51.3	31	1:41.39	+3.93
34	74	Jure Čas	Slovenia	50.26	41	51.52	33	1:41.78	+4.32
35	19	Cameron Smith	United States	50.38	45	51.69	38	1:42.07	+4.61
36	77	Mateusz Garniewicz	Poland	50.47	47	51.65	36	1;42.12	+4.66
37	82	Yuri Danilochkin	Belarus	50.89	50	51.61	34	1:42.5	+5.04
38	68	Jakub Klusak	Poland	50.43	46	52.35	39	1:42.78	+5.32
39	59	Rickard Kåhre	Sweden	51.63	55	51.68	37	1:43.31	+5.85
40	69	Evgenij Tulupov	Russia	51.18	52	52.51	40	1;43.69	+6.23
41	81	Georgi Nushev	Bulgaria	51.44	54	53.45	41	1;44.89	+7.43
42	71	Graham Black	United States	51.34	53	53.68	42	1:45.02	+7.56
43	44	Simon Efimov	Russia	52.22	59	53.87	43	1:46.09	+8.63
44	62	Alex Leever	United States	52.46	63	54.32	44	1:46.78	+9.32
45	97	Daniil Chertsin	Belarus	52.79	65	54.94	45	1:47.73	+10.27
45	83	Lee Jang-Woo	South Korea	52.29	62	55.44	47	1:47.73	+10.27
47	96	Domen Rupinik	Slovenia	53	66	55.12	46	1:48.12	+10.66
48	84	Choi Chang-Hyun	South Korea	52.22	59	56.17	49	1:48.39	+10.93
49	95	Aivaras Tumas	Lithuania	54.89	68	55.75	48	1;50.64	+13.18
50	100	Andriy Mariichyn	Ukraine	54.52	67	56.41	50	1;50.93	+13.47
51	99	Ihor Ham	Ukraine	55	70	56.45	51	1:51.45	+13.99
52	92	Wang Yu	China	57.68	72	59.83	52	1:57.51	+20.05
	27	Kasper Hietanen	Finland	52.22	59	DNS	—		
	46	Juho-Pekka Penttinen	Finland	49.87	32	DNS	—		
	5	Nils Allegre	France	48.68	10	DNF	—		
	16	Miyamoto Shinya	Japan	57.87	73	DNF	—		
	24	Axel William Patricksson	Norway	48.52	7	DNF	—		
	32	Yuri Mougel	France	50.3	43	DNF	—		
	33	Roger Carry	Canada	50.73	49	DNF	—		
	35	Nicholas Moynihan	Great Britain	50.23	39	DNF	—		
	37	Maximilian Wimmler	Austria	50.27	42	DNF	—		
	40	Vincent Lajoie	Canada	49.55	25	DNF	—		
	48	Adam Chrapek	Poland	50.68	48	DNF	—		
	54	Nakamura Shun	Japan	50.18	37	DNF	—		
	57	Pierfrancesco Monaci	Italy	51.73	56	DNF	—		
	60	Jesper Ask	Sweden	49.93	33	DNF	—		
	63	Hong Dong-Kwan	South Korea	51.01	51	DNF	—		
	79	Kim Seul-Kyung	South Korea	51.83	58	DNF	—		
	80	Kim Hyeon-Soo	South Korea	52.48	64	DNF	—		
	86	Levent Taş	Turkey	54.95	69	DNF	—		
	94	Lü Wenqiang	China	1:03.86	74	DNF	—		
	101	Taras Kovbasnyuk	Ukraine	57.41	71	DNF	—		
	49	Noel von Grünigen	Switzerland	49.19	17	DSQ	—		
	73	Robert Solsona	Andorra	51.75	57	DSQ	—		
	66	Filip Mlinšek	Slovenia	DNS	—				
	85	Arnau Puig Davi	Andorra	DNS	—				
	87	Michael Waligora	Czech Republic	DNS	—				
	6	William Schuessler Bedard	Canada	DNF	—				
	10	Elie Gateau	France	DNF	—				
	22	Kristoffer Berger	Norway	DNF	—				
	26	David Herzog	Austria	DNF	—				
	28	Anton Cassman	Sweden	DNF	—				
	31	Jakob Eriksson	Sweden	DNF	—				
	34	Stian Saugestad	Norway	DNF	—				
	38	Taylor Shiffrin	United States	DNF	—				
	41	Casper Stein-Lagerheim	Sweden	DNF	—				
	47	Ivo Ricou	France	DNF	—				
	52	Juan del Campo	Spain	DNF	—				
	53	Vegard Busengdal	Norway	DNF	—				
	55	Matej Falat	Slovakia	DNF	—				
	58	Alberto Chiappa	Italy	DNF	—				
	67	Anton Smolenskiy	Russia	DNF	—				
	70	Kim Dong-Woo	South Korea	DNF	—				
	76	Daniel Paulus	Czech Republic	DNF	—				
	78	Paweł Starzyk	Poland	DNF	—				
	88	Martin Hyška	Slovakia	DNF	—				
	89	Martin Rázus	Slovakia	DNF	—				
	90	Martin Štĕpán	Czech Republic	DNF	—				
	91	Shota Natadze	Georgia	DNF	—				
	93	Mustafa Topaloğlu	Turkey	DNF	—				
	98	Emre Şimşek	Turkey	DNF	—				
