= Ramon Zenhäusern =

Swiss alpine skier (born 1992)

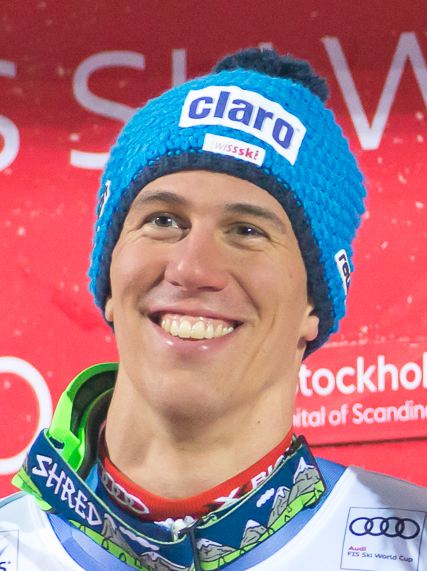
- At Stockholm in 2018

Personal information
- Born: 4 May 1992 (age 34) Bürchen, Valais, Switzerland
- Height: 2.02 m (6 ft 8 in)
- Weight: 95 kg (209 lb)
- Website: ramon-zenhaeusern.ch

Skiing career
- Country: Switzerland
- Sport: Alpine skiing
- Club: Bürchen
- Disciplines: Slalom, Parallel slalom
- World Cup debut: 11 November 2012 (age 20)

Olympics
- Teams: 3 – (2014–2022)
- Medals: 2 (1 gold)

World Championships
- Teams: 5 – (2013, 2017–2023)
- Medals: 1 (1 gold)

World Cup
- Seasons: 13 – (2013–2025)
- Wins: 6 – (4 SL, 2 PS)
- Podiums: 13 – (10 SL, 3 PS)
- Overall titles: 0 – (10th in 2023)
- Discipline titles: 0 – (3rd in SL, 2021)
Medal record
Men's alpine skiing
Representing Switzerland
World Cup race podiums
Event	1st	2nd	3rd
Slalom	4	4	2
Parallel	2	0	1
Total	6	4	3
Olympic Games
Gold medal – first place	2018 Pyeongchang	Team event
Silver medal – second place	2018 Pyeongchang	Slalom
World Championships
Gold medal – first place	2019 Åre	Team event
Winter Universiade
Gold medal – first place	2015 Granada	Slalom

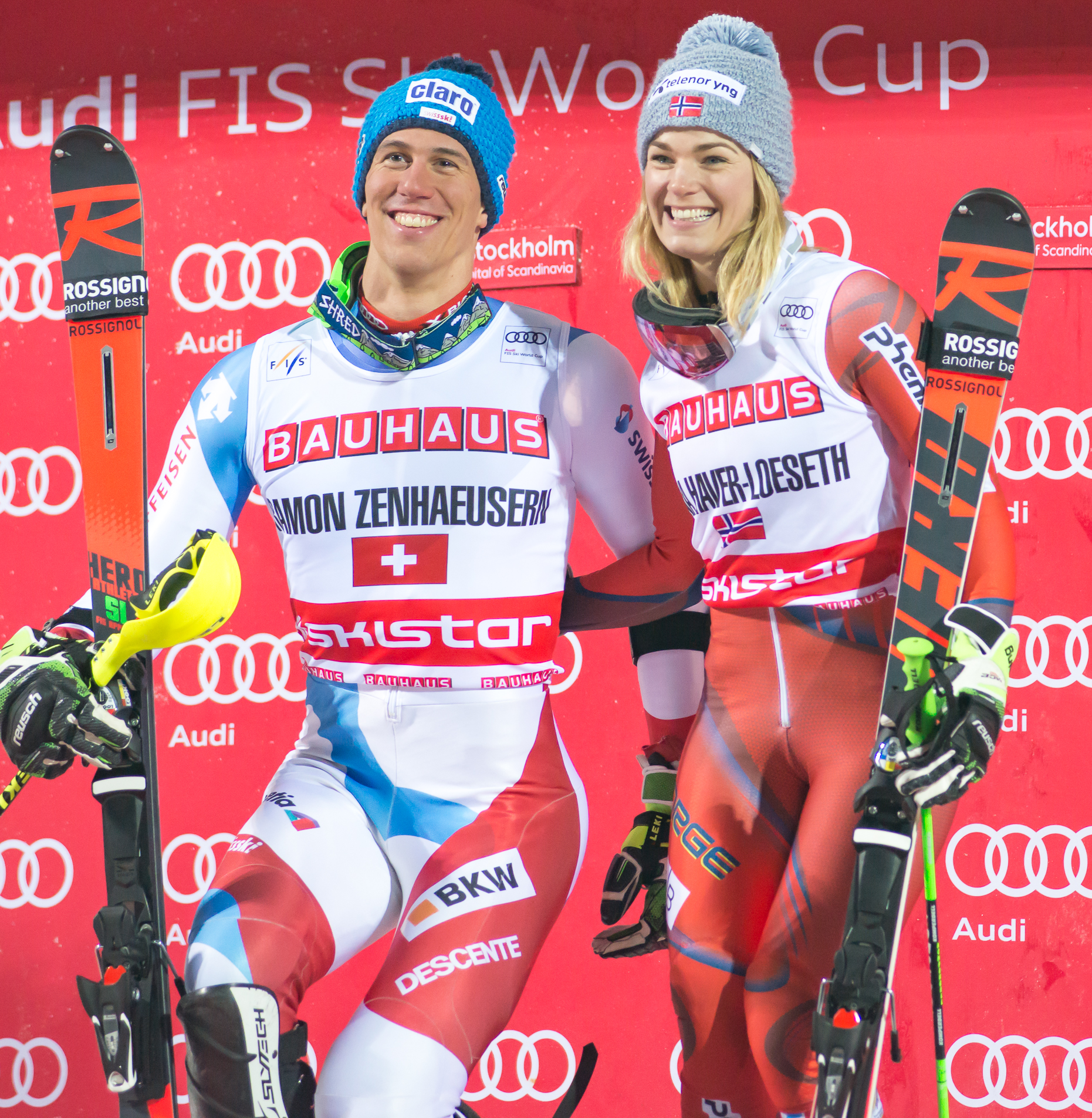
Parallel slalom winners at Stockholm in 2018, Ramon and Nina Haver-Løseth

Ramon Zenhäusern (born 4 May 1992) is a Swiss World Cup alpine ski racer and specializes in slalom. He made his World Cup debut in November 2012 and competed at the 2014 Winter Olympics in Sochi, in slalom. At the Olympics in 2018, Zenhäusern took silver in the slalom and gold in the team event. He competed in the slalom at the 2022 Olympic Winter Games in Beijing. At his third World Championships in 2019, he was fifth in the slalom and won gold in the team event.

== World Cup results ==
=== Season standings ===
Season	Age	Overall	Slalom	Giant slalom	Super-G	Downhill	Combined	Parallel
2013	20	110	44	—	—	—	—	—N/a
2014	21	110	39	—	—	—	—	—N/a
2015	22	110	36	—	—	—	—	—N/a
2016	23	82	26	—	—	—	—	—N/a
2017	24	71	26	—	—	—	—	—N/a
2018	25	26	6	—	—	—	—	—N/a
2019	26	14	4	—	—	—	—	—N/a
2020	27	23	4	—	—	—	—	—
2021	28	13	3	—	—	—	—N/a	—
2022	29	66	25	—	—	—	—N/a	—
2023	30	10	3	—	—	—	—N/a	—N/a
2024	31	84	27	—	—	—	—N/a	—N/a
2025	32	101	38	—	—	—	—N/a	—N/a

Standings through 3 March 2025

=== Race podiums ===
- 6 wins (4 SL, 2 PS)
- 13 podiums (10 SL, 3 PS), 36 top tens

Season	Date	Location	Discipline	Place
2018	30 January 2018	Stockholm, Sweden	Parallel slalom	1st
2018	4 March 2018	Kranjska Gora, Slovenia	Slalom	3rd
2019	1 January 2019	Oslo, Norway	Parallel slalom	3rd
2019	19 February 2019	Stockholm, Sweden	Parallel slalom	1st
2019	10 March 2019	Kranjska Gora, Slovenia	Slalom	1st
2020	5 January 2020	Zagreb, Croatia	Slalom	2nd
2021	21 December 2020	Alta Badia, Italy	Slalom	1st
2021	30 January 2021	Chamonix, France	Slalom	2nd
2021	31 January 2021	Chamonix, France	Slalom	2nd
2021	14 March 2021	Kranjska Gora, Slovenia	Slalom	3rd
2023	24 January 2023	Schladming, Austria	Slalom	2nd
2023	4 February 2023	Chamonix, France	Slalom	1st
2023	19 March 2023	Soldeu, Andorra	Slalom	1st

== World Championship results ==
Year	Age	Slalom	Giant slalom	Super-G	Downhill	Combined	Parallel	Team event
2013	20	DNF1	—	—	—	—	—N/a	—
2015	22	—	—	—	—	—	—N/a	—
2017	24	DNF2	—	—	—	—	—N/a	—
2019	26	5	—	—	—	—	—N/a	1
2021	28	11	—	—	—	—	—	—
2023	30	9	—	—	—	—	—	—

== Olympic results ==
Year	Age	Slalom	Giant slalom	Super-G	Downhill	Combined	Team event
2014	21	19	—	—	—	—	—N/a
2018	25	2	—	—	—	—	1
2022	29	12	—	—	—	—	—

== Universiade results ==
Year	Age	Slalom	Giant slalom	Super-G	Combined
2015	22	1	6	—	—
