= Alpine skiing at the 2015 Winter Universiade – Men's slalom =

The men's slalom competition of the 2015 Winter Universiade was held at Universiade slope, Sierra Nevada, Spain on February 14, 2015.

== Results ==
Rank	Bib	Name	Nation	Run 1	Rank	Run 2	Rank	Total	Behind
1st place, gold medalist(s)	8	Ramon Zenhäusern	Switzerland	47.89	1	47.97	1	1:35.86	
2nd place, silver medalist(s)	14	Matej Falat	Slovakia	50.05	4	49.49	5	1:39.54	+3.68
3rd place, bronze medalist(s)	5	Filip Mlinšek	Slovenia	49.77	3	49.82	8	1:39.59	+3.73
4	7	Robin Buffet	France	50.05	4	50.25	14	1:40.3	+4.44
5	10	Emil Johansson	Sweden	50.86	12	49.72	7	1:40.58	+4.72
6	4	Nakamura Shun	Japan	50.44	6	50.28	15	1:40.72	+4.86
7	16	Pol Carreras	Spain	50.75	10	50.03	9	1:40.78	+4.92
8	34	Youri Mougel	France	51.29	14	49.7	6	1:40.99	+5.13
9	3	Sandro Boner	Switzerland	50.55	7	50.49	19	1:41.04	+5.18
10	19	Richard Leitgeb	Austria	50.67	9	50.39	17	1;41.06	+5.2
11	31	Noel von Grünigen	Switzerland	51.9	17	49.4	3	1:41.3	+5.44
12	39	Nils Allegre	France	52.07	20	49.25	2	1:41.32	+5.46
13	32	Adam Zika	Czech Republic	51.75	16	50.12	11	1;41.87	+6.01
14	6	Sean Horner	United States	51.95	18	50.42	18	1:42.37	+6.51
15	36	Bernhard Binderitsch	Austria	53.95	25	49.47	4	1:43.42	+7.56
16	17	Miyamoto Shinya	Japan	53.5	21	50.35	16	1:43.85	+7.99
17	84	Kristoffer Berger	Norway	53.64	23	50.23	12	1:43.87	+8.01
18	30	Alex Leever	United States	53.63	22	51.02	20	1:44.65	+8.79
19	60	Simon Efimov	Russia	54.67	28	50.23	12	1:44.9	+9.04
20	67	Jakub Klusak	Poland	55.34	30	50.07	10	1:45.41	+9.55
21	61	Martin Hyška	Slovakia	56.07	32	52	22	1:48.07	+12.21
22	47	Claude-Simon Toutant	Canada	56.35	33	52.01	23	1;48.36	+12.5
23	58	Axel William Patricksson	Norway	54.1	26	55.77	25	1:49.87	+14.01
24	75	Graham Black	United States	57.05	34	54.11	24	1:51.16	+15.3
25	90	Aivaras Tumas	Lithuania	58:25	35	57:15	26	1:55.4	+19.54
26	96	Taras Kovbasnyuk	Ukraine	1:01.75	37	59:85	28	2:01.6	+25.74
27	91	Andriy Mariichyn	Ukraine	1:04.1	38	57:57	27	2:01.67	+25.81
28	27	Taylor Shiffrin	United States	1:15.94	39	51:17	21	2:07.11	+31.25
	73	Vladimir Siráň	Slovakia	55.4	31	DNS	—		
	1	Vegard Busengdal	Norway	50.82	11	DNF	—		
	2	Maxime Rizzo	France	49.24	2	DNF	—		
	13	Joel Müller	Switzerland	50.64	8	DNF	—		
	25	Kasper Hietanen	Finland	53.74	24	DNF	—		
	38	Alex Puente Tasias	Spain	51.28	13	DNF	—		
	41	Juan Del Campo	Spain	51.47	15	DNF	—		
	49	Josh Alayrach	Andorra	52	19	DNF	—		
	79	Robert Solsona	Andorra	55.12	29	DNF	—		
	80	Vincent Lajoie	Canada	54.37	27	DNF	—		
	92	Danil Chertsin	Belarus	58.94	36	DSQ	—		
	15	Juho-Pekka Penttinen	Finland	DNS	—				
	51	Martin Štĕpán	Czech Republic	DNS	—				
	71	Daniel Paulus	Czech Republic	DNS	—				
	85	Michael Waligora	Czech Republic	DNS	—				
	9	Casper Stein-Lagerheim	Sweden	DNF	—				
	11	Giulio Bosca	Italy	DNF	—				
	12	Georgi Nushev	Bulgaria	DNF	—				
	18	Michelangelo Tentori	Italy	DNF	—				
	20	Franck Berla	France	DNF	—				
	21	Jakob Špik	Slovenia	DNF	—				
	22	Cedric Noger	Switzerland	DNF	—				
	23	Luca Riorda	Italy	DNF	—				
	24	Rickard Kåhre	Sweden	DNF	—				
	26	Dries van den Broecke	Belgium	DNF	—				
	28	Anton Cassman	Sweden	DNF	—				
	29	Max Marno	United States	DNF	—				
	33	Rocco Delsante	Italy	DNF	—				
	35	Nicholas Moynihan	Great Britain	DNF	—				
	37	David Herzog	Austria	DNF	—				
	40	Jonas Fabre	France	DNF	—				
	42	Jesper Ask	Sweden	DNF	—				
	43	Philippe Rivet	Canada	DNF	—				
	44	Vladislav Novikov	Russia	DNF	—				
	45	Axel Esteve	Andorra	DNF	—				
	46	Evgeniy Pyasik	Russia	DNF	—				
	48	Jakob Eriksson	Sweden	DNF	—				
	50	Roger Carry	Canada	DNF	—				
	52	Maximillian Wimmler	Austria	DNF	—				
	53	Kim Dong-woo	South Korea	DNF	—				
	54	Kim Hyeon-soo	South Korea	DNF	—				
	55	Mateusz Garniewicz	Poland	DNF	—				
	56	Martin Rázus	Slovakia	DNF	—				
	57	Cameron Smith	United States	DNF	—				
	59	Hong Dong-kwan	South Korea	DNF	—				
	62	Patrick Boner	Switzerland	DNF	—				
	63	Kalle Peltola	Finland	DNF	—				
	64	Andraž Reich-Pogladič	Slovenia	DNF	—				
	65	Paweł Starzyk	Poland	DNF	—				
	66	Jure Čas	Slovenia	DNF	—				
	68	Kim Seul-kyung	South Korea	DNF	—				
	69	Maksim Stukov	Russia	DNF	—				
	70	William Bedard Schuessler	Canada	DNF	—				
	72	Lee Jang-woo	South Korea	DNF	—				
	74	Alberto Chiappa	Italy	DNF	—				
	76	Arnau Puig Davi	Andorra	DNF	—				
	77	Pierfrancesco Monaci	Italy	DNF	—				
	78	Choi Chang-hyun	South Korea	DNF	—				
	81	Anton Smolenskiy	Russia	DNF	—				
	82	Evgenij Tulupov	Russia	DNF	—				
	83	Levent Taş	Turkey	DNF	—				
	86	Yuri Danilochkin	Belarus	DNF	—				
	87	Shota Natadze	Georgia	DNF	—				
	88	Emre Şimşek	Turkey	DNF	—				
	89	Wang Yu	China	DNF	—				
	93	Ihor Ham	Ukraine	DNF	—				
	94	Dominik Rupnik	Slovenia	DNF	—				
	95	Lü Wenqiang	China	DNF	—				
