= Kosovo at the 2018 Winter Olympics =

- Flag of Kosovo
- IOC code: KOS
- NOC: Olympic Committee of Kosovo
- Website: www.noc-kosovo.org

in Pyeongchang, South Korea 9–25 February 2018
- Competitors: 1 (1 man) in 1 sport
- Flag bearer: Albin Tahiri
- Medals: Gold 0 Silver 0 Bronze 0 Total 0

Winter Olympics appearances (overview)
- 2018; 2022; 2026

Other related appearances
- Yugoslavia (1924–1992); Serbia and Montenegro (1998–2006); Serbia (2010–2014)

Kosovo competed at the 2018 Winter Olympics in Pyeongchang, South Korea, which were held from 9 to 25 February 2018. The country's participation in Pyeongchang marked its first appearance at the Winter Olympics. The athlete delegation of the country was composed of one singular competitor, alpine skier Albin Tahiri.

Tahiri would compete in all of the male alpine skiing events at the 2018 Winter Games. He would not medal in either one of them, but placed as high as 37th.

== Background ==
The 2018 Winter Olympics were held in Pyeongchang, South Korea, from 9 to 25 February 2018. This edition marked the nation's first appearance at the Winter Olympics after making their Olympic debut at the 2016 Summer Olympics in Rio de Janeiro, Brazil.

=== Opening and closing ceremonies ===
The Kosovar delegation came in 71st out of the 91 National Olympic Committees in the 2018 Winter Olympics Parade of Nations within the opening ceremony. Alpine skier Albin Tahiri solely held the flag for the delegation in the parade. At the closing ceremony, Tahiri held the flag again.

== Competitors ==
List of Kosovar competitors at the 2018 Winter Olympics
Sport	Men	Women	Total
Alpine skiing	1	0	1
Total	1	0	1

== Alpine skiing ==
Kosovo qualified one male alpine skier. The athlete that qualified was Albin Tahiri. He trained at Mölltaler Gletscher, an Austrian skiing center, in the lead-up to the Winter Games. He would compete in all five male events at the 2018 Winter Games.

The alpine skiing events were held at the Yongpyong Alpine Centre. Tahiri first competed in the men's combined on 13 February. He would record a time of 1:23.84 for his first run and a time of 59.56, finishing with a combined total of 2:23.40. There, he would finish 37th out of the 65 athletes that competed in the event. Tahiri would then compete in the men's downhill three days later. He would record a time of 1:48.81 and place 50th out of the 55 athletes that competed in the event.

The following day, he would compete in the men's super-G and record a time of 1:32.74. He would place 47th out of the 61 competitors that competed in the event. At the men's giant slalom on 18 February, he would record a time of 1:19.49 for his first run and 1:17.98 for his second, adding up to a total of 2:37.47. He would place 56th out of the 109 athletes that competed in the event. His last event would be the men's slalom on 22 February. There, he would record a time of 1:00.80 for his first run and 1:02.13 for his second, adding up to a total of 2:02.93. He would place 39th out of the 102 competitors that competed in the event.

Athlete	Event	Run 1		Run 2		Total	
Athlete	Event	Time	Rank	Time	Rank	Time	Rank
Albin Tahiri	Men's giant slalom	1:19.49	65	1:17.98	55	2:37.47	56
Albin Tahiri	Men's slalom	1:00.80	48	1:02.13	39	2:02.93	39
Albin Tahiri	Men's combined	1:23.84	55	59.56	36	2:23.40	37
Albin Tahiri	Men's super-G	—				1:32.74	47
Albin Tahiri	Men's downhill	—				1:48.81	50

== See also ==
- Kosovo at the 2018 Summer Youth Olympics
