= FIS Alpine World Ski Championships 2015 – Men's giant slalom =

Men's giant slalom at the FIS Alpine World Ski Championships 2015
- Venue: Birds of Prey; Beaver Creek, Colorado, U.S.
- Date: February 13, 2015
- Competitors: 107 from 52 nations
- Winning time: 2:34.16

Medalists
| gold medal | Ted Ligety | United States |
| silver medal | Marcel Hirscher | Austria |
| bronze medal | Alexis Pinturault | France |

The Men's giant slalom competition at the 2015 World Championships was held on February 13. Ted Ligety won his third consecutive world title.

A qualification was held a day earlier.

== Results ==
The first run was started at 10:15 and the second run at 14:15.

| Rank | Bib | Name | Nation | Run 1 | Rank | Run 2 | Rank | Total | Diff |
|---|---|---|---|---|---|---|---|---|---|
| 1st place, gold medalist(s) | 6 | Ted Ligety | United States | 1:15.42 | 5 | 1:18.74 | 1 | 2:34.16 | |
| 2nd place, silver medalist(s) | 3 | Marcel Hirscher | Austria | 1:15.18 | 1 | 1:19.43 | 3 | 2:34.61 | +0.45 |
| 3rd place, bronze medalist(s) | 2 | Alexis Pinturault | France | 1:15.41 | 3 | 1:19.63 | 4 | 2:35.04 | +0.88 |
| 4 | 7 | Felix Neureuther | Germany | 1:15.41 | 3 | 1:19.85 | 9 | 2:35.26 | +1.10 |
| 5 | 17 | Matts Olsson | Sweden | 1:15.66 | 6 | 1:19.73 | 6 | 2:35.39 | +1.23 |
| 6 | 12 | Roberto Nani | Italy | 1:15.36 | 2 | 1:20.21 | 11 | 2:35.57 | +1.41 |
| 7 | 8 | Victor Muffat-Jeandet | France | 1:16.00 | 10 | 1:19.71 | 5 | 2:35.71 | +1.55 |
| 8 | 21 | Florian Eisath | Italy | 1:16.64 | 18 | 1:19.29 | 2 | 2:35.93 | +1.77 |
| 9 | 9 | Tim Jitloff | United States | 1:15.79 | 7 | 1:20.25 | 13 | 2:36.04 | +1.88 |
| 10 | 19 | Philipp Schörghofer | Austria | 1:15.85 | 8 | 1:20.43 | 16 | 2:36.28 | +2.12 |
| 11 | 15 | Carlo Janka | Switzerland | 1:16.36 | 14 | 1:20.03 | 10 | 2:36.39 | +2.23 |
| 12 | 29 | Dustin Cook | Canada | 1:16.60 | 17 | 1:19.82 | 8 | 2:36.42 | +2.26 |
| 13 | 14 | Henrik Kristoffersen | Norway | 1:15.98 | 9 | 1:20.61 | 20 | 2:36.59 | +2.43 |
| 14 | 10 | Marcus Sandell | Finland | 1:16.18 | 11 | 1:20.71 | 23 | 2:36.89 | +2.73 |
| 15 | 5 | Fritz Dopfer | Germany | 1:16.59 | 16 | 1:20.42 | 15 | 2:37.01 | +2.85 |
| 16 | 25 | Filip Zubčić | Croatia | 1:16.34 | 13 | 1:20.68 | 22 | 2:37.02 | +2.86 |
| 17 | 18 | Davide Simoncelli | Italy | 1:16.32 | 12 | 1:20.73 | 24 | 2:37.05 | +2.89 |
| 18 | 38 | Trevor Philp | Canada | 1:17.62 | 26 | 1:19.79 | 6 | 2:37.41 | +3.25 |
| 19 | 34 | Tommy Ford | United States | 1:17.41 | 21 | 1:20.21 | 11 | 2:37.62 | +3.46 |
| 20 | 16 | Stefan Luitz | Germany | 1:16.42 | 15 | 1:21.41 | 31 | 2:37.83 | +3.67 |
| 21 | 26 | Samu Torsti | Finland | 1:17.40 | 20 | 1:20.49 | 18 | 2:37.89 | +3.73 |
| 22 | 31 | Phil Brown | Canada | 1:17.71 | 27 | 1:20.28 | 14 | 2:37.99 | +3.83 |
| 23 | 36 | Kryštof Krýzl | Czech Republic | 1:17.50 | 23 | 1:20.51 | 19 | 2:38.01 | +3.85 |
| 24 | 23 | Giovanni Borsotti | Italy | 1:17.54 | 25 | 1:20.81 | 25 | 2:38.35 | +4.19 |
| 25 | 22 | Gino Caviezel | Switzerland | 1:17.20 | 19 | 1:21.21 | 30 | 2:38.41 | +4.25 |
| 26 | 33 | Brennan Rubie | United States | 1:17.48 | 22 | 1:20.99 | 27 | 2:38.47 | +4.31 |
| 27 | 27 | Elia Zurbriggen | Switzerland | 1:17.53 | 24 | 1:21.12 | 29 | 2:38.65 | +4.49 |
| 28 | 44 | Erik Read | Canada | 1:18.26 | 31 | 1:20.47 | 17 | 2:38.73 | +4.57 |
| 29 | 40 | David Chodounsky | United States | 1:17.86 | 28 | 1:21.04 | 28 | 2:38.90 | +4.74 |
| 30 | 28 | Justin Murisier | Switzerland | 1:18.11 | 29 | 1:20.84 | 26 | 2:38.95 | +4.79 |
| 31 | 35 | Rasmus Windingstad | Norway | 1:18.37 | 32 | 1:20.62 | 21 | 2:38.99 | +4.83 |
| 32 | 47 | Andreas Žampa | Slovakia | 1:19.45 | 38 | 1:22.01 | 32 | 2:41.46 | +7.30 |
| 33 | 51 | Klemen Kosi | Slovenia | 1:19.64 | 39 | 1:22.11 | 33 | 2:41.75 | +7.59 |
| 34 | 48 | Charlie Raposo | Great Britain | 1:19.04 | 35 | 1:22.97 | 35 | 2:42.01 | +7.85 |
| 35 | 59 | Stefan Prisadov | Bulgaria | 1:19.93 | 41 | 1:22.67 | 34 | 2:42.60 | +8.44 |
| 36 | 56 | Cristian Javier Simari Birkner | Argentina | 1:19.43 | 37 | 1:23.53 | 38 | 2:42.96 | +8.80 |
| 37 | 50 | Kristaps Zvejnieks | Latvia | 1:20.30 | 43 | 1:23.07 | 36 | 2:43.37 | +9.21 |
| 38 | 54 | Jack Gower | Great Britain | 1:19.73 | 40 | 1:23.74 | 39 | 2:43.47 | +9.31 |
| 39 | 63 | Adam Barwood | New Zealand | 1:20.48 | 45 | 1:23.46 | 37 | 2:43.94 | +9.78 |
| 40 | 64 | Jung Dong-hyun | South Korea | 1:20.67 | 46 | 1:23.79 | 40 | 2:44.46 | +10.30 |
| 41 | 68 | Armand Marchant | Belgium | 1:20.71 | 47 | 1:24.41 | 41 | 2:45.12 | +10.96 |
| 42 | 71 | Elias Kolega | Croatia | 1:20.85 | 48 | 1:24.82 | 42 | 2:45.67 | +11.51 |
| 43 | 69 | Kim Hyeon-tae | South Korea | 1:21.58 | 49 | 1:25.30 | 44 | 2:46.88 | +12.72 |
| 44 | 70 | Alex Beniaidze | Georgia | 1:22.17 | 51 | 1:25.60 | 45 | 2:47.77 | +13.61 |
| 45 | 78 | William Vukelić | Croatia | 1:22.78 | 54 | 1:25.20 | 43 | 2:47.98 | +13.82 |
| 46 | 84 | Igor Laikert | Bosnia and Herzegovina | 1:22.31 | 52 | 1:26.32 | 46 | 2:48.63 | +14.47 |
| 47 | 76 | Alexandru Barbu | Romania | 1:22.46 | 53 | 1:27.03 | 50 | 2:49.49 | +15.33 |
| 48 | 74 | Einar Kristgeirsson | Iceland | 1:23.07 | 55 | 1:26.53 | 47 | 2:49.60 | +15.44 |
| 49 | 72 | Nicolas Carvallo | Chile | 1:23.31 | 56 | 1:26.83 | 48 | 2:50.14 | +15.98 |
| 50 | 57 | Kyung Sung-hyun | South Korea | 1:24.00 | 57 | 1:26.88 | 49 | 2:50.88 | +16.72 |
| 51 | 79 | Jeroen van den Bogaert | Belgium | 1:24.00 | 57 | 1:27.85 | 51 | 2:51.85 | +17.69 |
| 52 | 86 | Igor Zakurdayev | Kazakhstan | 1:24.14 | 60 | 1:29.61 | 52 | 2:53.75 | +19.59 |
| 61 | 77 | Norbert Farkas | Hungary | 1:26.11 | 61 | | | | |
| 62 | 85 | Michel Macedo | Brazil | 1:26.25 | 62 | | | | |
| 63 | 96 | Ivan Kovbasnyuk | Ukraine | 1:26.27 | 63 | | | | |
| 64 | 80 | Dardan Dehari | Macedonia | 1:26.30 | 64 | | | | |
| 65 | 82 | Erjon Tola | Albania | 1:26.57 | 65 | | | | |
| 66 | 91 | Patrick McMillan | Ireland | 1:26.87 | 66 | | | | |
| 67 | 83 | Casper Dyrbye Næsted | Denmark | 1:27.16 | 67 | | | | |
| 68 | 99 | Kamiljon Tukhtaev | Uzbekistan | 1:27.85 | 68 | | | | |
| 69 | 89 | Evgeniy Timofeev | Kyrgyzstan | 1:27.90 | 69 | | | | |
| 70 | 98 | Itamar Biran | Israel | 1:28.31 | 70 | | | | |
| 70 | 94 | Alexandre Mohbat | Lebanon | 1:28.31 | 70 | | | | |
| 72 | 92 | Tarik Hadžić | Montenegro | 1:29.80 | 72 | | | | |
| 73 | 88 | Rokas Zaveckas | Lithuania | 1:30.00 | 73 | | | | |
| 74 | 93 | Geoffrey Osch | Luxembourg | 1:30.78 | 74 | | | | |
| 75 | 95 | Manfred Oettl Reyes | Peru | 1:31.96 | 75 | | | | |
| 76 | 100 | Pieris Pieri | Cyprus | 1:38.40 | 76 | | | | |
| 77 | 87 | Zhang Xiaosong | China | 1:40.44 | 77 | | | | |
| 78 | 97 | Himanshu Thakur | India | 1:42.45 | 78 | | | | |
| | 43 | Linus Strasser | Germany | 1:18.84 | 34 | DNS | | | |
| | 32 | Calle Lindh | Sweden | 1:18.16 | 30 | DNF | | | |
| | 45 | Maarten Meiners | Netherlands | 1:18.80 | 33 | DNF | | | |
| | 55 | Martin Vráblík | Czech Republic | 1:19.07 | 36 | DNF | | | |
| | 58 | Luc Henri Chevalier | Australia | 1:20.15 | 42 | DNF | | | |
| | 52 | Ross Peraudo | Australia | 1:20.39 | 44 | DNF | | | |
| | 66 | Henrik von Appen | Chile | 1:21.72 | 50 | DNF | | | |
| | 75 | Massimiliano Valcareggi | Greece | 1:24.02 | 59 | DNF | | | |
| | 62 | Dean Travers | Cayman Islands | DNS | | | | | |
| | 1 | Benjamin Raich | Austria | DNF | | | | | |
| | 4 | Thomas Fanara | France | DNF | | | | | |
| | 11 | Mathieu Faivre | France | DNF | | | | | |
| | 13 | Leif Kristian Haugen | Norway | DNF | | | | | |
| | 20 | Christoph Nösig | Austria | DNF | | | | | |
| | 24 | André Myhrer | Sweden | DNF | | | | | |
| | 30 | Žan Kranjec | Slovenia | DNF | | | | | |
| | 37 | Adam Žampa | Slovakia | DNF | | | | | |
| | 39 | Aleksander Andrienko | Russia | DNF | | | | | |
| | 41 | Pavel Trikhichev | Russia | DNF | | | | | |
| | 42 | Sebastian Brigović | Croatia | DNF | | | | | |
| | 46 | Dominic Demschar | Australia | DNF | | | | | |
| | 49 | Eemeli Pirinen | Finland | DNF | | | | | |
| | 53 | Nick Prebble | New Zealand | DNF | | | | | |
| | 60 | Luke Laidlaw | Australia | DNF | | | | | |
| | 61 | Willis Feasey | New Zealand | DNF | | | | | |
| | 65 | Warren Cummings Smith | Estonia | DNF | | | | | |
| | 67 | Albert Popov | Bulgaria | DNF | | | | | |
| | 73 | Maciej Bydliński | Poland | DNF | | | | | |
| | 81 | Andrija Vuković | Serbia | DNF | | | | | |
| | 90 | Vincenzo Michelotti | San Marino | DNF | | | | | |
