= Kosovo at the 2022 Winter Olympics =

- Flag of Kosovo
- IOC code: KOS
- NOC: Olympic Committee of Kosovo
- Website: www.noc-kosovo.org

in Beijing, China 4–20 February 2022
- Competitors: 2 (1 man and 1 woman) in 1 sport
- Flag bearer (opening): Albin Tahiri
- Flag bearer (closing): Volunteer
- Medals: Gold 0 Silver 0 Bronze 0 Total 0

Winter Olympics appearances (overview)
- 2018; 2022; 2026

Other related appearances
- Yugoslavia (1924–1992); Serbia and Montenegro (1998–2006); Serbia (2010–2014)

Kosovo competed at the 2022 Winter Olympics in Beijing, China, from 4 to 20 February 2022.

Kosovo's team consists of two alpine skiers (one man and one woman). This marks the first time Kosovo has a female competitor on its Winter Olympics team. Both skiers were the country's flagbearer during the opening ceremony. However, because Kryeziu was identified as a close contact of one of the team's coaches infected with SARS-CoV-2 before the opening ceremony, only Tahiri was able to serve as the team's opening ceremony flag bearer. Meanwhile a volunteer was the flagbearer during the closing ceremony.

== Competitors ==
The following is the list of number of competitors participating at the Games per sport/discipline.

Sport	Men	Women	Total
Alpine skiing	1	1	2
Total	1	1	2

== Alpine skiing ==
By meeting the basic qualification standards, Kosovo qualified one male and one female alpine skier.

Athlete	Event	Run 1		Run 2		Total	
Athlete	Event	Time	Rank	Time	Rank	Time	Rank
Albin Tahiri	Men's downhill	—N/a				1:52.44	35
Albin Tahiri	Men's giant slalom	1:13.42	37	1:16.43	29	2:29.85	30
Albin Tahiri	Men's slalom	1:04.01	44	58.93	36	2:02.94	37
Albin Tahiri	Men's combined	1:52.44	22	55.85	15	2:48.29	15
Kiana Kryeziu	Women's giant slalom	1:18.78	59	1:23.41	49	2:42.19	49
