= Sung-il =

- Hangul: 성일
- RR: Seongil
- MR: Sŏngil

Sung-il, also spelled Seong-il or Seoung-il, is a Korean given name.

People with this name include:

- Kim Sŏngil (1538–1593), Joseon Dynasty politician
- Shin Seong-il (born 1937 as Kang Shin-young), South Korean actor
- Kim Sung-il (general) (born 1948), South Korean pilot, former Air Force Chief of Staff
- Jung Sung-il (director) (born 1959), South Korean film critic, director and screenwriter
- Jung Sung-il (figure skater) (born 1969), South Korean figure skater
- Song Sung-il (1969–1995), South Korean Greco-Roman wrestler
- Kim Sung-il (footballer, born 1973), South Korean football player
- Kim Seoung-il (born 1990), South Korean short track speed skater
- Kang Song-il (born 1994), North Korean alpine skier
- Pak Song-il, North Korean diplomat
- Kim Song-il, North Korean politician

== See also ==
- List of Korean given names
- Li Sung Il (리승일), North Korean table tennis player
