= 2022–23 FIS Alpine Ski Far East Cup =

Discipline	Men	Women
Overall	(Japan) Seigo Kato	(South Korea) Gim So-hui
Giant Slalom	(Japan) Seigo Kato	(Japan) Miki Ishibashi
Slalom	(South Korea) Jung Dong-hyun	(South Korea) Gim So-hui

Competition
Locations	4 venues	4 venues
Individual	14 events	14 events

The 2022–23 FIS Alpine Ski Far East Cup is the upcoming Far East Cup season, the second international level competition in alpine skiing.

== Men ==
=== Calendar ===
Stage	Date	Place	Discipline	Winner	Second	Third	Details
1	25 January 2023	(Japan) Akan	Giant Slalom	(Japan) Seigo Kato	(Austria) Christoph Meissl	(Austria) Lukas Gasser	
2	26 January 2023	(Japan) Akan	Giant Slalom	(Austria) Noel Zwischenbrugger	(Austria) Nicolas Gstrein	(Austria) Tobias Kogler	
3	27 January 2023	(Japan) Akan	Slalom	(Japan) Takayuki Koyama	(Japan) Shiro Aihara	(Japan) Hayata Wakatsuki	
4	28 January 2023	(Japan) Akan	Slalom	(Poland) Michał Jasiczek	(Austria) Lucas Rohrmoser	(Japan) Shiro Aihara	
5	2 February 2023	(South Korea) Alpensia	Slalom	(South Korea) Jung Dong-hyun	(Japan) Seigo Kato	(Poland) Michał Jasiczek	
6	3 February 2023	(South Korea) Alpensia	Slalom	(South Korea) Jung Dong-hyun	(Japan) Seigo Kato	(Poland) Jedrzej Jasiczek	
7	6 February 2023	(South Korea) Yongpyong	Giant Slalom	(Japan) Shinya Miyamoto	(Japan) Taiga Tomii	(Japan) Seigo Kato	
8	7 February 2023	(South Korea) Yongpyong	Giant Slalom	(Japan) Seigo Kato	(South Korea) Hong Dong-kwan	(Japan) Ryoma Katayama	
9	10 February 2023	(South Korea) Alpensia	Slalom	(South Korea) Jung Dong-hyun	(Poland) Jedrzej Jasiczek	(Poland) Michał Jasiczek	
10	11 February 2023	(South Korea) Alpensia	Slalom	(South Korea) Jung Dong-hyun	(Japan) Akira Sasaki	(Japan) Ryunosuke Ohkoshi	
11	28 February 2023	(Japan) Sugadairakogen	Giant Slalom	(South Korea) Jung Dong-hyun	(Japan) Takashi Shioiri	(Japan) Ryunosuke Ohkoshi	
12	1 March 2023	(Japan) Sugadairakogen	Giant Slalom	(Japan) Seigo Kato	(South Korea) Jung Dong-hyun	(Japan) Takashi Shioiri	
13	2 March 2023	(Japan) Sugadairakogen	Slalom	(South Korea) Jung Dong-hyun	(Japan) Shiro Aihara	(Japan) Seigo Kato	
14	3 March 2023	(Japan) Sugadairakogen	Slalom	(Japan) Seigo Kato	(Japan) Yohei Koyama	(Japan) Shiro Aihara	

=== Rankings ===
==== Overall ====
Rank	after 14 of 14 races	Points
1	(Japan) Seigo Kato	810
2	(South Korea) Jung Dong-hyun	691
3	(Japan) Ryuma Sato	509
4	(Japan) Ryunosuke Ohkoshi	449
5	(Japan) Taiga Tomii	327

==== Giant Slalom ====
Rank	after 6 of 6 races	Points
1	(Japan) Seigo Kato	445
2	(Japan) Taiga Tomii	256
3	(Japan) Ryuma Sato	231
4	(South Korea) Hong Dong-kwan	209
5	(South Korea) Jung Dong-hyun	191

==== Slalom ====
Rank	after 8 of 8 races	Points
1	(South Korea) Jung Dong-hyun	500
2	(Japan) Seigo Kato	365
3	(Poland) Jedrzej Jasiczek	313
4	(Poland) Michał Jasiczek	291
5	(Japan) Ryunosuke Ohkoshi	290

== Women ==
=== Calendar ===
Stage	Date	Place	Discipline	Winner	Second	Third	Details
1	23 January 2023	(Japan) Akan	Giant Slalom	(Japan) Miki Ishibashi	(South Korea) Gim So-hui	(Japan) Mao Nakazawa	
2	25 January 2023	(Japan) Akan	Giant Slalom	(Japan) Shizuku Hirota	(Japan) Miki Ishibashi	(Japan) Eren Watanabe	
3	27 January 2023	(Japan) Akan	Slalom	(South Korea) Gim So-hui	(Japan) Miki Ishibashi	(Japan) Eren Watanabe	
4	28 January 2023	(Japan) Akan	Slalom	(South Korea) Gim So-hui	(Japan) Yukina Tomii	(Japan) Konatsu Hasumi	
5	2 February 2023	(South Korea) Alpensia	Slalom	(Czech Republic) Adriana Jelinkova	(South Korea) Gim So-hui	(Japan) Yoko Ishijima	
6	3 February 2023	(South Korea) Alpensia	Slalom	(Czech Republic) Adriana Jelinkova	(South Korea) Gim So-hui	(South Korea) Kang Youngseo	
7	6 February 2023	(South Korea) Yongpyong	Giant Slalom	(Japan) Miki Ishibashi	(Czech Republic) Adriana Jelinkova	(South Korea) Gim So-hui	
8	7 February 2023	(South Korea) Yongpyong	Giant Slalom	(Czech Republic) Adriana Jelinkova	(Japan) Miki Ishibashi	(South Korea) Gim So-hui	
9	10 February 2023	(South Korea) Alpensia	Slalom	(Japan) Chisaki Maeda	(Japan) Konatsu Hasumi	(Japan) Yoko Ishijima	
10	11 February 2023	(South Korea) Alpensia	Slalom	(Japan) Yukina Tomii	(Japan) Konatsu Hasumi	(Japan) Chisaki Maeda	
11	28 February 2023	(Japan) Sugadairakogen	Giant Slalom	(Japan) Miho Mizutani	(Japan) Miki Ishibashi	(South Korea) Gim So-hui	
12	1 March 2023	(Japan) Sugadairakogen	Giant Slalom	(Japan) Miki Ishibashi	(South Korea) Gim So-hui	(Japan) Miho Mizutani	
13	2 March 2023	(Japan) Sugadairakogen	Slalom	(Japan) Chisaki Maeda	(Japan) Konatsu Hasumi	(Japan) Yoko Ishijima	
14	3 March 2023	(Japan) Sugadairakogen	Slalom	(Japan) Miki Ishibashi	(Japan) Eren Watanabe	(Japan) Asami Katagiri	

=== Rankings ===
==== Overall ====
Rank	after 14 of 14 races	Points
1	(South Korea) Gim So-hui	857
2	(Japan) Miki Ishibashi	827
3	(Japan) Eren Watanabe	505
4	(Japan) Chisaki Maeda	496
5	(Japan) Yoko Ishijima	453

==== Giant Slalom ====
Rank	after 6 of 6 races	Points
1	(Japan) Miki Ishibashi	540
2	(South Korea) Gim So-hui	380
3	(Japan) Shizuku Hirota	248
4	(Japan) Ayano Yokoo	223
5	(Japan) Eren Watanabe	181

==== Slalom ====
Rank	after 8 of 8 races	Points
1	(South Korea) Gim So-hui	477
2	(Japan) Konatsu Hasumi	380
3	(Japan) Yoko Ishijima	351
4	(Japan) Chisaki Maeda	337
5	(Japan) Eren Watanabe	324
