= Kosovo at the 2026 Winter Olympics =

- Flag of Kosovo
- IOC code: KOS
- NOC: Olympic Committee of Kosovo
- Website: www.noc-kosovo.org

in Milan and Cortina d'Ampezzo, Italy 6 February 2026 – 22 February 2026
- Competitors: 2 (1 man and 1 woman) in 1 sport
- Flag bearers (opening): Drin Kokaj & Kiana Kryeziu
- Flag bearer (closing): Drin Kokaj
- Medals: Gold 0 Silver 0 Bronze 0 Total 0

Winter Olympics appearances (overview)
- 2018; 2022; 2026

Other related appearances
- Yugoslavia (1924–1992); Serbia and Montenegro (1998–2006); Serbia (2010–2014)

Kosovo competed at the 2026 Winter Olympics in Milan and Cortina d'Ampezzo, Italy, from 6 to 22 February 2026.

Alpine skiers Drin Kokaj and Kiana Kryeziu were the country's flagbearer during the opening ceremony. Meanwhile, Drin Kokaj was the country's flagbearer during the closing ceremony.

== Competitors ==
The following is the list of number of competitors participating at the Games per sport/discipline.

Sport	Men	Women	Total
Alpine skiing	1	1	2
Total	1	1	2

== Alpine skiing ==
Kosovo qualified one male and one female alpine skier through the basic quota.

Athlete	Event	Run 1		Run 2		Total	
Athlete	Event	Time	Rank	Time	Rank	Time	Rank
Drin Kokaj	Men's slalom	DNF					
Kiana Kryeziu	Women's super-G	—N/a				DNF	
Kiana Kryeziu	Women's giant slalom	DNF					
Kiana Kryeziu	Women's slalom	DNF					
