= Germán Madrazo =

Mexican Cross-Country Skier and Businessman

Germán Madrazo OLY
Personal information
- Nationality: Mexican
- Born: 15 September 1974 (age 51) Santiago de Querétaro
- Occupation: Business Owner (Valley Running Company)
- Height: 6 ft 0 in (183 cm)
- Weight: 163 lb (74 kg)
- Spouse: Lucia Madrazo

Sport
- Country: Mexico
- Sport: Cross-country skiing
- Event: Men's 15km Cross-country Skiing
- Coached by: Andy Leibner

Germán Madrazo Baca (born 15 September 1974) is a Mexican cross-country skier and businessman. He competed in the 2018 Winter Olympics. Madrazo is the owner of The Valley Running Company in McAllen, Texas, where he resides.

== 2018 Winter Olympics ==
Prior to competing in the 2018 Winter Games, Madrazo was a triathlete who competed professionally in a number of events. He became interested in cross-country skiing after reading an article about Peruvian cross-country skier Roberto Carcelén in a sports magazine. He contacted Carcelén to ask for his advice and later travelled to South America where he met other skiers and coaches. Along with Chilean skier Yonathan Jesús Fernández and Tongan skier Pita Taufatofua, he formed an independent training group in an attempt to qualify for the 2018 Olympic Winter Games in Pyeongchang. The three skiers, under the initiative of Taufatofua, rented a cabin in Hittisau, Austria, and trained for 10 hours daily. He formed part of the Mexican Ski Federation component of the Mexican delegation to the 2018 Olympics, along with alpine skiers Sarah Schleper and Rodolfo Dickson, and freestyle skier Roberto Franco.

At the opening ceremony in PyeongChang, Madrazo acted as the flag bearer for team Mexico. Sporting a traditional charro hat, Madrazo received praise for his high "level of happy" at the opening ceremony.

Later, Madrazo competed in the Men's 15km Cross-country skiing event. Although Madrazo came in last of those who finished (116), he was once again praised for his undying level of enthusiasm as he celebrated his presence at the Olympics waving a Mexican flag given by a fan. Taufatofua, who finished 114 and about 3 minutes ahead, waited for him at the finish line. Winner Dario Cologna of Switzerland returned to the finish line to shake his hand.

Olympic Games
Preceded by Daniela Campuzano	Flagbearer for Mexico; Pyeongchang 2018	Succeeded by Gabriela López and Rommel Pacheco
