= William Vukelić =

Croatian alpine skier (born 1998)

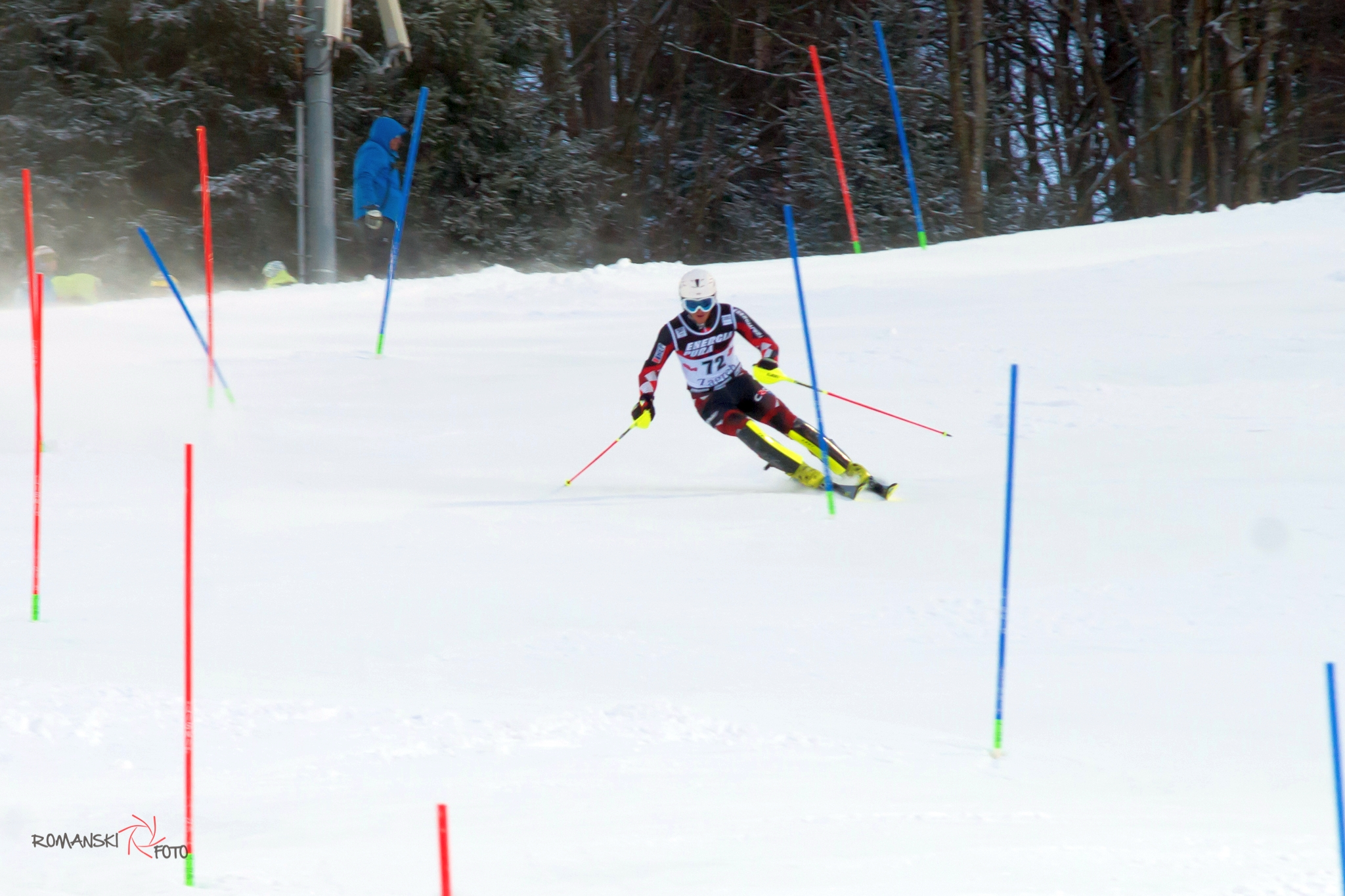
- William Vukelic

Personal information
- Born: 29 September 1998 (age 27) Rijeka, Croatia
- Height: 178 cm (5 ft 10 in)

Skiing career
- Sport: Alpine skiing

William Vukelić (born 1998) is a Croatian alpine ski racer.

He competed at the 2015 World Championships in Beaver Creek, USA, in the giant slalom. His first FIS World Cup race was on March 4 in Kranjska Gora, Slovenia where he finished 62nd with nearly 4 seconds behind eventual winner Alexis Pinturault. His starting number was 75.
