= Luc Henri Chevalier =

Australian alpine ski racer (born 1992)

Personal information
- Born: 1992 (age 33–34)

Skiing career
- Sport: Alpine skiing

Luc Henri Chevalier (born 1992) is an Australian alpine ski racer.

He competed at the 2015 World Championships in Beaver Creek, USA, in the giant slalom.
