= Charlie Raposo =

British alpine skier

Personal information
- Born: 15 January 1996 (age 30) London UK
- Height: 172 cm (5 ft 8 in)
- Website: www.charlieraposo.com

Skiing career
- Sport: Alpine skiing
- Retired: April 2024
- Disciplines: Giant Slalom, Parallel
- World Cup debut: 2017

Olympics
- Teams: Team GB

World Championships
- Teams: British Alpine World Cup Team

World Cup
- Seasons: 8
Medal record
European Cup Giant Slalom bronze

Charlie Raposo (born 15 January 1996) is a former British Alpine ski racer, turned sports businessman, entrepreneur, and investor. He retired from his athletic career in 2024, and shortly after launched 1936, the global sports investment and operating platform.

He competed on the FIS Alpine World Cup Tour for eight seasons, making history as the best male Giant Slalom skier in British skiing history, achieving three World Cup points results, the best of which being a 16th place in Kranjska Gora, Slovenia, in March 2022. In February 2023, he achieved a 17th place finish at the 2023 FIS Alpine World Ski Championships in Courchevel, France. He competed at four World Ski Championships, his first being at the 2015 World Championships in Beaver Creek, USA, in the giant slalom.

In April 2022, it was announced that Charlie would be the first official signed skier for Marcel Hirscher's ski brand, Van Deer-Red Bull Sports despite intense speculation regarding who the first signee would be in the build up to the announcement suggesting many other top names.

In May 2024 he announced his retirement after having ruptered his ACL knee ligament in March while competing in the FIS World Cup in Aspen, Colorado.
