= Yuri Danilochkin =

Belarusian alpine skier (born 1991)

Personal information
- Born: 22 February 1991 (age 35) Minsk, Belarus

Skiing career
- Sport: Alpine skiing
- Disciplines: Downhill, combined
- World Cup debut: 16 December 2011 (age 20)

Olympics
- Teams: 2 (2014, 2018)

World Championships
- Teams: 3 – (2011–13, 17)

World Cup
- Seasons: 7 – (2012–18)
- Overall titles: 0 – (135th in 2012)
- Discipline titles: 0 – (39th in KB, 2012)

Yuri Danilochkin (born 22 February 1991) is a Belarusian alpine skier. He has competed at the 2014 Winter Olympics in Sochi.

== World Cup results ==
=== Season standings ===
Season
Season	Age	Overall	Slalom	Giant; Slalom	Super G	Downhill	Combined
2012	21	135	—	—	—	—	39

=== Results per discipline ===
Discipline	WC starts	WC Top 30	WC Top 15	WC Top 5	WC Podium	Best result		
Discipline	WC starts	WC Top 30	WC Top 15	WC Top 5	WC Podium	Date	Location	Place
Slalom	6	0	0	0	0	24 January 2014	Kitzbühel, Austria	52nd
Giant slalom	4	0	0	0	0	26 February 2012	Crans-Montana, Switzerland	48th
Super-G	9	0	0	0	0	20 December 2013	Val Gardena, Italy	56th
Downhill	15	0	0	0	0	26 January 2013	Kitzbühel, Austria	41st
Combined	9	1	0	0	0	12 February 2012	Sochi, Russia	25th
Total	43	1	0	0	0			

- standings through 26 Jan 2019

== World Championship results ==
Year
Year	Age	Slalom	Giant; Slalom	Super G	Downhill	Combined	Team Event
2011	20	DNF1	51	34	40	20	—
2013	22	38	43	53	DNF	19	—
2017	26	DNF1	DNF2	41	—	—	—
2019	28			48	49		

== Olympic results ==
Year
Year	Age	Slalom	Giant; Slalom	Super G	Downhill	Combined
2014	23	DNF1	DNF1	37	31	DNF1
2018	27	33	54	42	44	34

== Winter Universiade results ==
Year
Year	Age	Slalom	Giant; Slalom	Super G	Downhill	Combined	Combined classification
2013	22	—	44	18	7	—	—N/a
2015	24	DNF1	37	15	—N/a	10	9
