= Alpine skiing at the 2026 Winter Olympics – Women's super-G =

Women's super-G at the XXV Olympic Winter Games
- Alpine skiing
- Venue: Olimpia delle Tofane, Cortina d'Ampezzo
- Date: 12 February 2026
- Competitors: 43 from 23 nations
- Winning time: 1:23.41

Medalists
| 1st place, gold medalist(s) | | Federica Brignone | Italy |
| 2nd place, silver medalist(s) | | Romane Miradoli | France |
| 3rd place, bronze medalist(s) | | Cornelia Hütter | Austria |

Women's Super-G
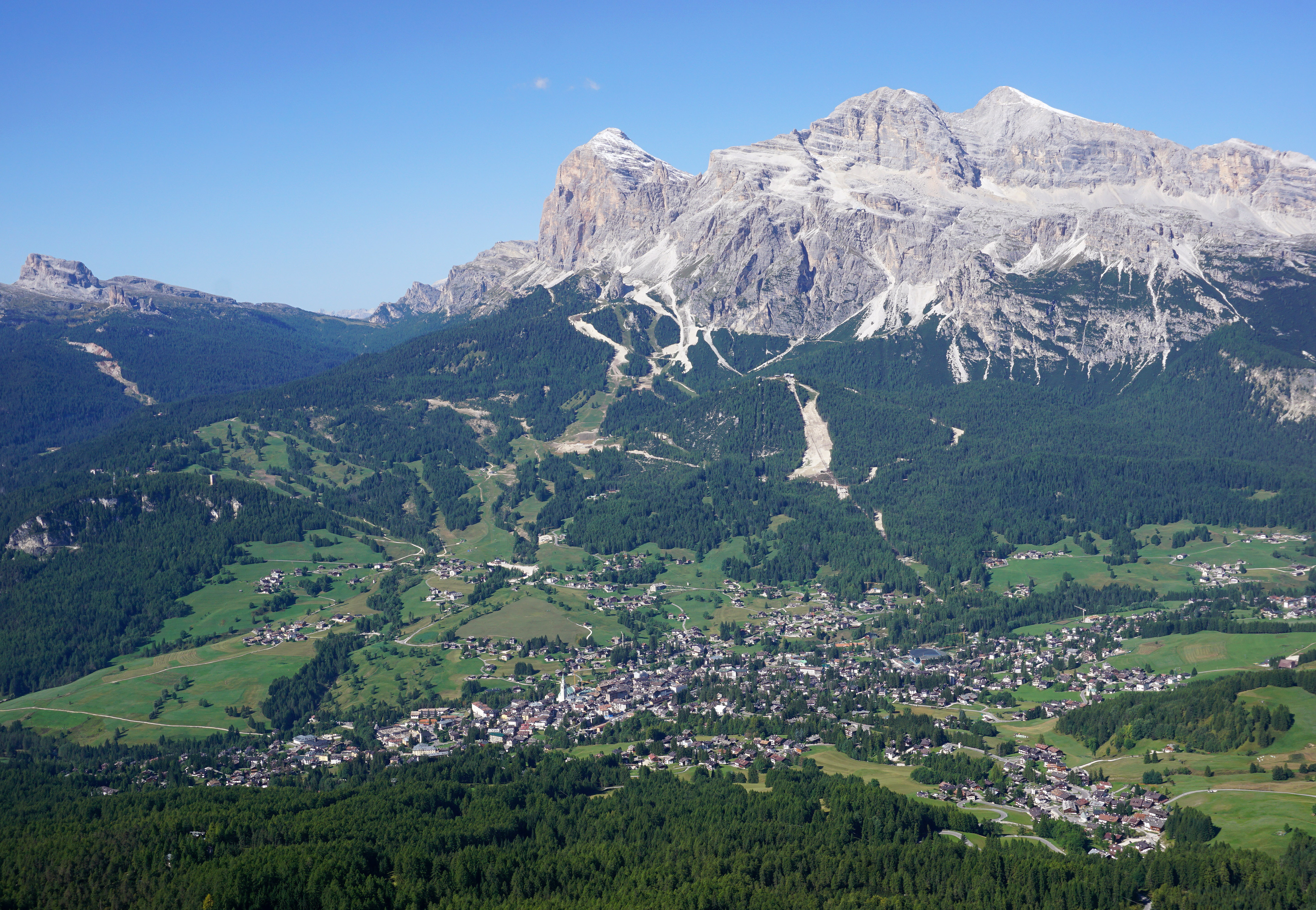
- Location: Olimpia delle Tofane
- Nearest major city: Cortina d'Ampezzo
- Vertical: 635 m (2,083 ft)
- Top elevation: 2,195 m (7,201 ft) AMSL
- Base elevation: 1,560 m (5,118 ft)
- Longest run: 2.105 km (1.31 mi)

The women's super-G competition of the 2026 Winter Olympics was held on Thursday, 12 February, at Olimpia delle Tofane in Cortina d'Ampezzo, Italy. Federica Brignone of Italy won the event, Romane Miradoli of France was second and Cornelia Hütter of Austria third. For Brignone this was the first Olympic gold, whereas Miradoli and Hütter won their first Olympic medals.

== Background ==
The 2022 champion, Lara Gut-Behrami, missed the Olympics due to injury, as did bronze medalist Michelle Gisin. Silver medalist Mirjam Puchner qualified for the event. Prior to the Olympics on the World Cup circuit, Mikaela Shiffrin led the overall and Sofia Goggia the super-G standings. Shiffrin did not enter the super-G at this Olympics. Stephanie Venier was the reigning world champion. The Olimpia delle Tofane course is a regular stop on the World Cup circuit, with women's speed events usually held in January.

== Results ==
The race started at 11:30 local time (UTC+1) under overcast skies. The air temperature was −4.0 °C (25 °F) at the starting gate and −0.7 °C (31 °F) at the finish area; the snow condition was hard packed.

| Rank | Bib | Name | Country | Time | Behind |
|---|---|---|---|---|---|
| 1st place, gold medalist(s) | 6 | Federica Brignone | Italy | 1:23.41 | |
| 2nd place, silver medalist(s) | 15 | Romane Miradoli | France | 1:23.82 | +0.41 |
| 3rd place, bronze medalist(s) | 10 | Cornelia Hütter | Austria | 1:23.93 | +0.52 |
| 4 | 12 | Ariane Rädler | Austria | 1:23.94 | +0.53 |
| 5 | 13 | Kajsa Vickhoff Lie | Norway | 1:24.17 | +0.76 |
| 5 | 2 | Laura Pirovano | Italy | 1:24.17 | +0.76 |
| 7 | 11 | Elena Curtoni | Italy | 1:24.18 | +0.77 |
| 8 | 16 | Camille Cerutti | France | 1:24.44 | +1.03 |
| 8 | 14 | Alice Robinson | New Zealand | 1:24.44 | +1.03 |
| 10 | 1 | Malorie Blanc | Switzerland | 1:24.65 | +1.24 |
| 11 | 5 | Corinne Suter | Switzerland | 1:24.80 | +1.39 |
| 12 | 20 | Laura Gauché | France | 1:25.02 | +1.61 |
| 13 | 22 | Jacqueline Wiles | United States | 1:25.40 | +1.99 |
| 14 | 31 | Barbora Nováková | Czech Republic | 1:25.58 | +2.17 |
| 15 | 18 | Keely Cashman | United States | 1:25.61 | +2.20 |
| 16 | 27 | Elvedina Muzaferija | Bosnia and Herzegovina | 1:25.85 | +2.44 |
| 17 | 28 | Delia Durrer | Switzerland | 1:25.95 | +2.54 |
| 18 | 26 | Maryna Gąsienica-Daniel | Poland | 1:26.07 | +2.66 |
| 19 | 29 | Julia Pleshkova | Individual Neutral Athletes | 1:26.32 | +2.91 |
| 20 | 38 | Alena Labaštová | Czech Republic | 1:27.94 | +4.53 |
| 21 | 40 | Rebeka Jančová | Slovakia | 1:28.51 | +5.10 |
| 22 | 39 | Nicole Begué | Argentina | 1:28.68 | +5.27 |
| 23 | 30 | Rosa Pohjolainen | Finland | 1:29.18 | +5.77 |
| 24 | 33 | Elisa Maria Negri | Czech Republic | 1:29.21 | +5.80 |
| 25 | 41 | Alexandra Skorokhodova | Kazakhstan | 1:31.22 | +7.81 |
| 26 | 43 | Sarah Schleper | Mexico | 1:31.37 | +7.96 |
| | 3 | Kira Weidle-Winkelmann | Germany | DNF | |
| | 4 | Mirjam Puchner | Austria | DNF | |
| | 7 | Emma Aicher | Germany | DNF | |
| | 8 | Ester Ledecká | Czech Republic | DNF | |
| | 9 | Sofia Goggia | Italy | DNF | |
| | 17 | Ilka Štuhec | Slovenia | DNF | |
| | 19 | Breezy Johnson | United States | DNF | |
| | 21 | Mary Bocock | United States | DNF | |
| | 23 | Nina Ortlieb | Austria | DNF | |
| | 24 | Janine Schmitt | Switzerland | DNF | |
| | 25 | Valérie Grenier | Canada | DNF | |
| | 32 | Jordina Caminal | Andorra | DNF | |
| | 34 | Cassidy Gray | Canada | DNF | |
| | 35 | Francesca Baruzzi Farriol | Argentina | DNF | |
| | 36 | Anastasiya Shepilenko | Ukraine | DNF | |
| | 37 | Matilde Schwencke | Chile | DNF | |
| | 42 | Kiana Kryeziu | Kosovo | DNF | |
