= Pieris Pieri =

Cypriot alpine ski racer (born 1996)

Personal information
- Born: 1996 (age 29–30)

Skiing career
- Sport: Alpine skiing

Pieris Pieri (born 1996) is a Cypriot alpine ski racer.

He competed at the 2015 World Championships in Beaver Creek, USA, in the giant slalom.
