= Němčičky (Břeclav District) =

- Municipality
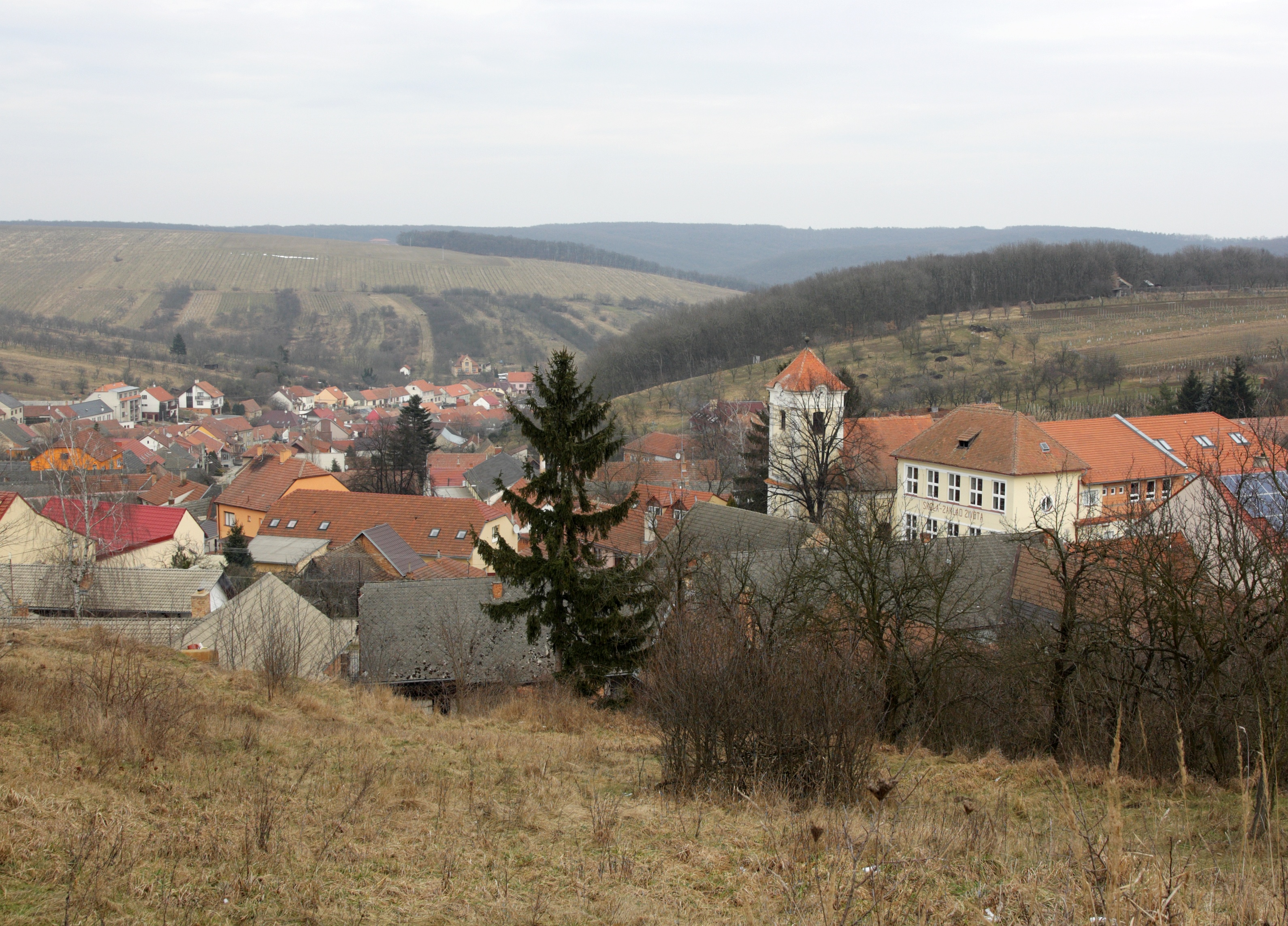
- General view

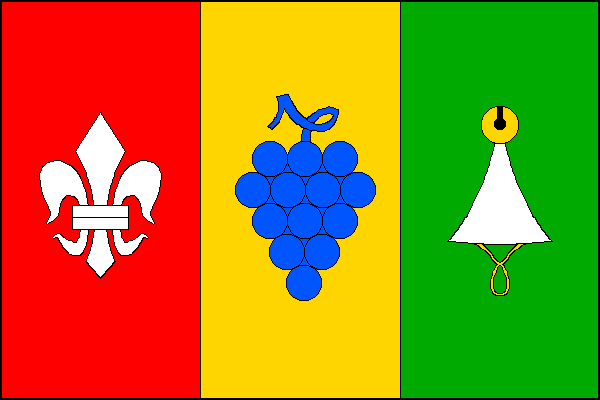
- Flag Coat of arms

- Location in the Czech Republic
- Coordinates: 48°56′8″N 16°49′27″E
- Country: Czech Republic
- Region: South Moravian
- District: Břeclav
- First mentioned: 1349

Area
  - Total: 7.74 km^{2} (2.99 sq mi)
- Elevation: 247 m (810 ft)

Population (2026-01-01)
  - Total: 726
  - Density: 93.8/km^{2} (243/sq mi)
- Time zone: UTC+1 (CET)
  - Summer (DST): UTC+2 (CEST)
- Postal code: 691 07
- Website: www.nemcicky.cz

Němčičky is a municipality and village in Břeclav District in the South Moravian Region of the Czech Republic. It has about 700 inhabitants.

Němčičky lies approximately 20 kilometres (12 mi) north of Břeclav, 34 km (21 mi) south-east of Brno, and 217 km (135 mi) south-east of Prague.

== Demographics ==
Historical population
Year	Pop.	±%
1869	674	—
1880	744	+10.4%
1890	758	+1.9%
1900	746	−1.6%
1910	746	+0.0%
1921	823	+10.3%
1930	814	−1.1%
1950	732	−10.1%
1961	792	+8.2%
1970	734	−7.3%
1980	714	−2.7%
1991	636	−10.9%
2001	601	−5.5%
2011	605	+0.7%
2021	707	+16.9%
Source: Censuses
