= Kiana Kryeziu =

Kosovan alpine skier (born 2004)

Personal information
- Born: 11 November 2004 (age 21) Pristina, United Nations Administered Kosovo

Skiing career
- Country: Kosovo
- Sport: Alpine skiing
- Club: Prishtina
- Disciplines: Slalom, giant slalom, super-G

Olympics
- Teams: 2 – (2022, 2026)
- Medals: 0

World Championships
- Teams: 2 – (2023, 2025)
- Medals: 0

Kiana Kryeziu (born 11 November 2004) is a Kosovan alpine skier. She competed in the 2022 and 2026 Winter Olympics.

== Career ==
Kryeziu began racing at the age of 10. After good results at FIS races at the end of 2021 and beginning of 2022, she qualified to represent Kosovo at the 2022 Winter Olympics. She became the first female to represent Kosovo at the Winter Olympics. She finished 49th out of 82 competitors in the women's giant slalom. Four years later at the Milano Cortina games, she entered three events but was unable to record a finish in any of them. She was also the flagbearer in the Parade of Nations during the opening ceremony.

== World Championships results ==
Year
Year	Age	Slalom	Giant slalom	Super-G	Downhill	Combined	Team combined	Parallel	Team event
2023	18	DNF1	DNQ	—	—	—	—N/a	—	—
2025	20	DNF1	DNF1	—	—	—N/a	—	—N/a	—

== Olympic results ==
Year
Year	Age	Slalom	Giant slalom	Super-G	Downhill	Combined	Team combined
2022	17	—	49	—	—	—	—N/a
2026	21	DNF1	DNF1	DNF	—	—N/a	—
