= Márton Kékesi =

Hungarian alpine skier (born 1995)

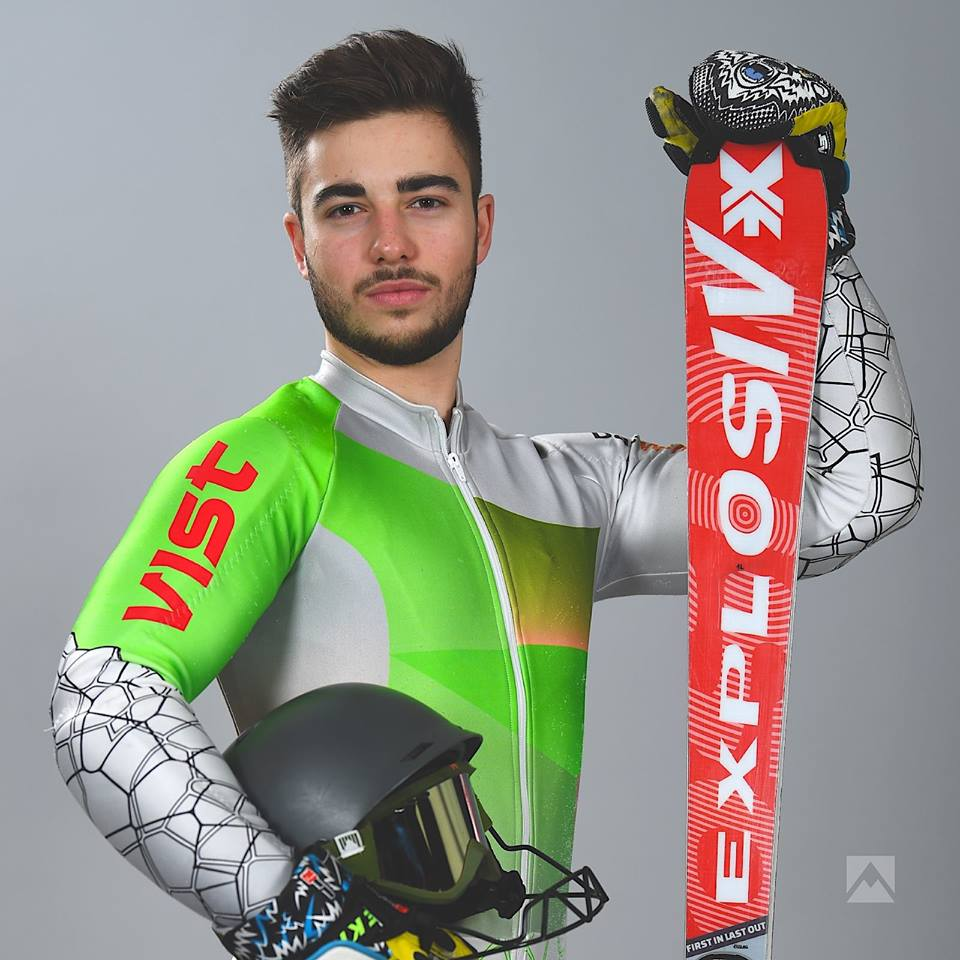
- Márton Kékesi Portrait for the 2018 Winter Olympic Games in Pyeongchang

Personal information
- Born: 19 December 1995 (age 30) Miskolc, Hungary
- Height: 173 cm (5 ft 8 in)

Skiing career
- Sport: Alpine skiing
- Club: DVTK (Diósgyőri VTK)
- Disciplines: Slalom, Giant Slalom, Super-G, Downhill, Alpine Combined

Olympics
- Teams: 2022 Beijing, 2018 PyeongChang, 2012 Innsbruck

World Championships
- Teams: 2011 Garmisch-Partenkirchen, 2013 Schladming, 2015 Vail / Beaver Creek),

Márton Kékesi (born 19 December 1995) is a member of the Hungarian national team in Alpine skiing.

== Career ==
In January 2012, Kékesi participated at the first ever Winter Youth Olympics, at the 2012 Winter Youth Olympics, in the Slalom, Giant Slalom, Super Combined and Super-G disciplines, at the World Junior Alpine Skiing Championships 2012 in Roccaraso, Italy, and in 2013, at the World Junior Alpine Skiing Championships in Mont-Sainte-Anne, Quebec, Canada, he took the first place in the U-18 category. His best result was a 26th place in the Slalom discipline.

He competed at the 2015 and 2017 FIS Alpine World Ski Championships in Beaver Creek, US and St. Moritz, Switzerland, respectively, in the Super-G discipline.

He is also a multiple Hungarian champion. He has been nominated to represent Hungary in all disciplines at the 2018 Winter Olympic Games in Pyeongchang, South Korea. During the races, he finished in all but Super G. His best result was the 30th place in Slalom discipline. In the Slalom and Giant Slalom events he skied on custom designed skis, designed by David Kutas.

Kekesi competed in Slalom and Giant Slalom disciplines at the 2022 Winter Olympic Games in Beijing, China. He was the flag bearer for Hungary, alongside Zita Tóth.

Winter Olympics
Preceded by Konrád Nagy	Flagbearer for Hungary (with Zita Tóth); Beijing 2022	Succeeded by Incumbent
