= Serdar Deniz =

Turkish alpine skier (born 1997)

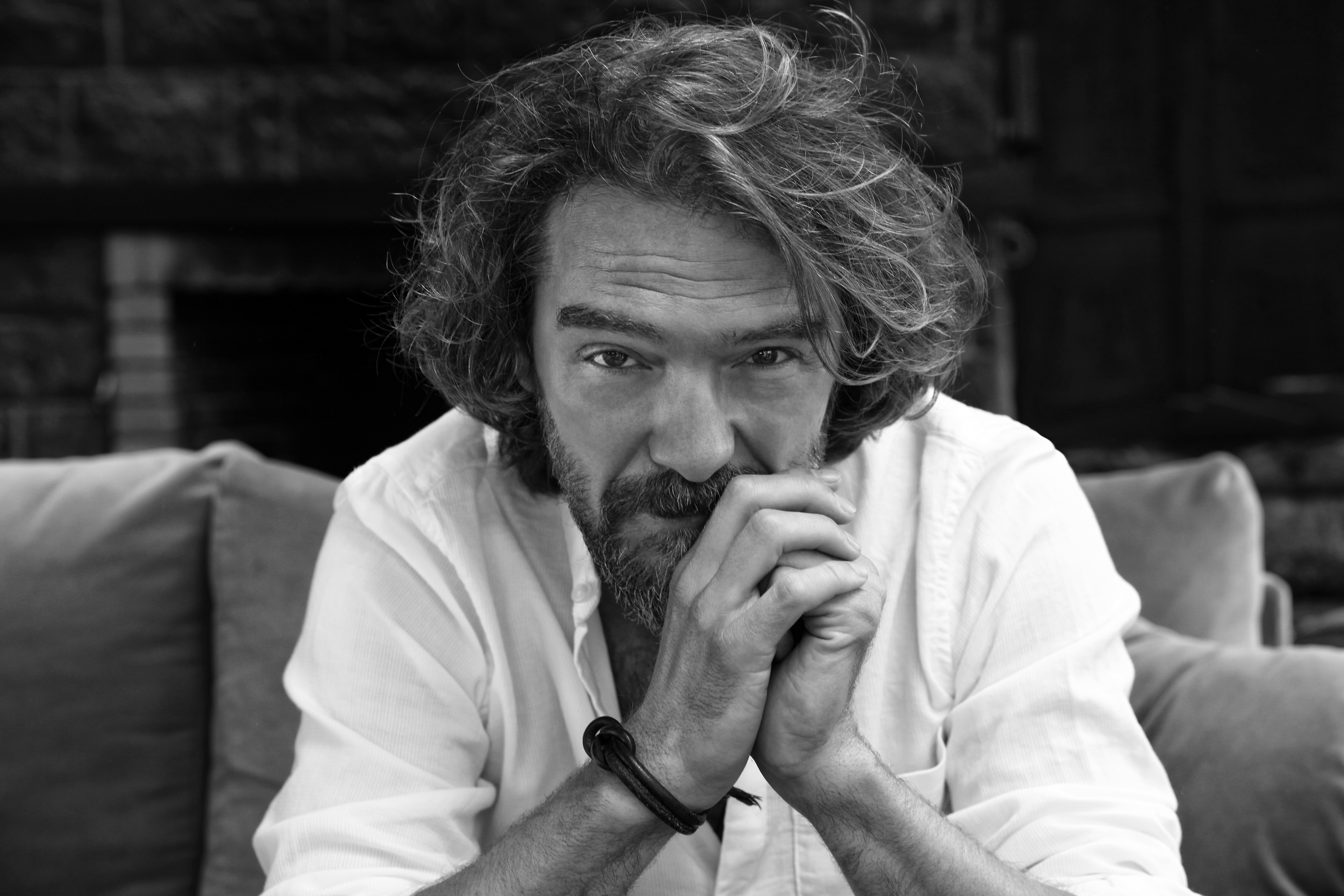

Personal information
- Nationality: Turkish
- Born: 6 February 1969 (age 57)
- Height: 1.72 m (5 ft 8 in)

Sport
- Sport: Alpine skiing

Serdar Deniz (born 26 June 1997) is a Turkish alpine skier. He competed in the 2018 Winter Olympics.
