= Robin Buffet =

French alpine skier (born 1991)

Robin Buffet (born 14 October 1991 in Annecy) is a French former alpine ski racer.
