= Emre Şimşek =

Turkish alpine skier (born 1987)

Personal information
- Born: June 14, 1987 (age 39) Bayburt, Turkey
- Height: 1.78 m (5 ft 10 in)

Sport
- Sport: Skiing

Emre Şimşek (born June 14, 1987) is an Olympian Turkish skier competing in the alpine disciplines. The 1.78 m (5 ft 10 in) tall athlete is coached by his father İsmail Şimşek.

== Early life ==
Emre Şimşek was born in Bayburt, Turkey on June 14, 1987. After finishing the high school at his hometown in 2005, he studied physical education and sports in the Kazım Karabekir Faculty of Education at Atatürk University in Erzurum. He graduated with a Bachelor's degree in 2009. Şimşek obtained a Master's degree in sports medicine in 2012. Currently, he is a lecturer at Sports College of Erciyes University in Kayseri.

== Career ==
Şimşek has nine Turkish champion titles in different age categories of slalom and giant slalom disciplines, and twice in grass skiing. He is holder of more than 50 medals. In the national team, Şimşek represented his country 122 times at international competitions. His major international participations include FIS Alpine World Ski Championships in 2007 Åre, Sweden and 2011 Garmisch, Germany, Winter Universiades in 2007 Turin, Italy, 2009 Harbin, China and 2011 Erzurum, Turkey as well as diverse FIS competitions between 2005 and 2013.

His best FIS point is 17.74, and best FIS average time is 26.61.

As one of the only six-athlete team Turkey, Şimşek takes part at the 2014 Winter Olympics in Sochi competing in the slalom and giant slalom events.

He is also a certified coach for alpine skiing.
