= Allen Behlok =

Lebanese alpine skier (born 1998)

Personal information
- Nationality: Lebanese
- Born: 16 October 1998 (age 26)

Sport
- Sport: Alpine skiing

Allen Behlok (born 16 October 1998) is a Lebanese alpine skier. He competed in the 2018 Winter Olympics.
