= Rodolfo Dickson =

Mexican Canadian alpine skier

Rodolfo Dickson FIS id: 540026
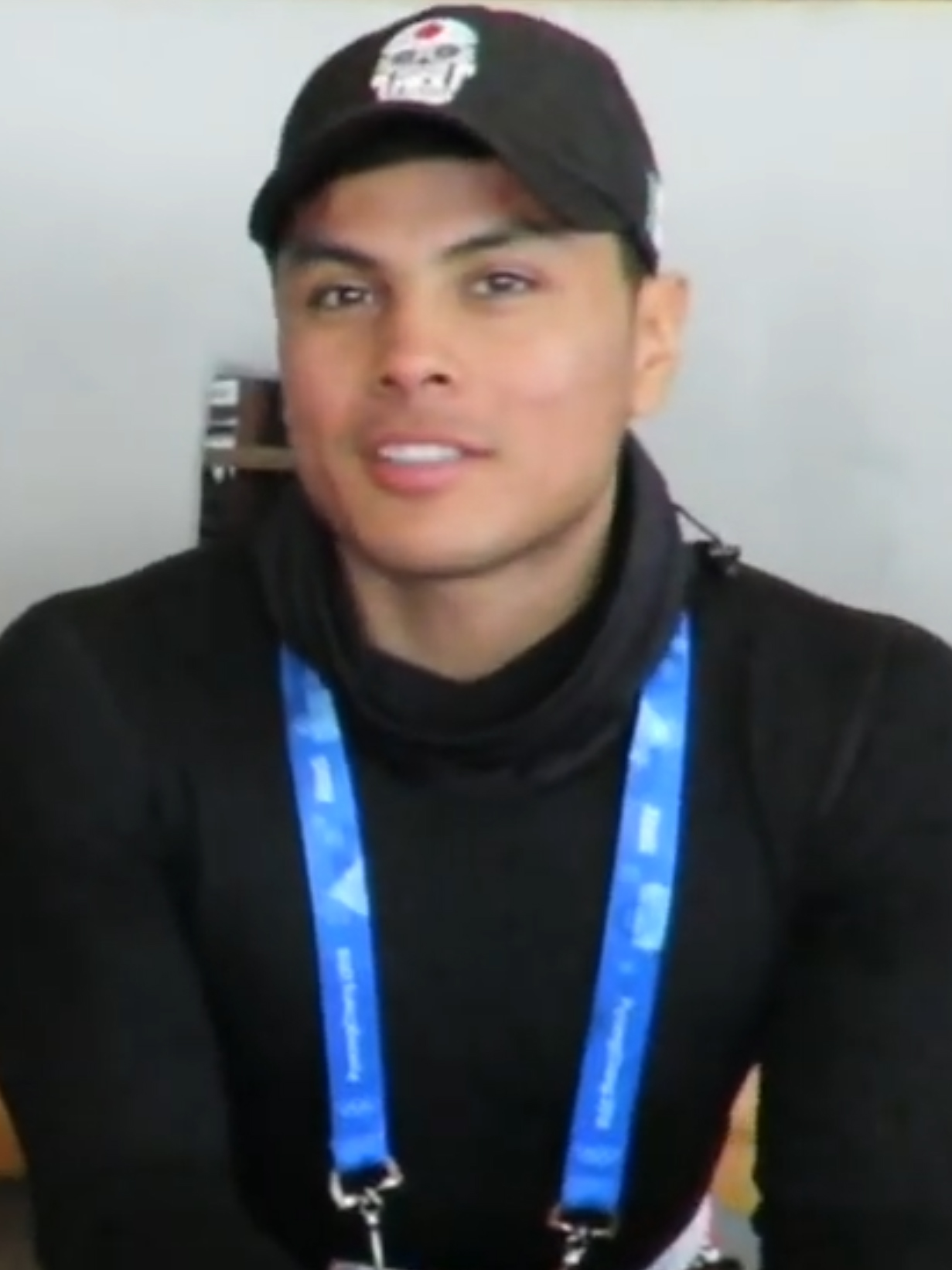
- Dickson in South Korea, February 2018

Personal information
- Full name: Rodolfo Roberto Dickson Sommers
- Nicknames: Rudolfo Dickson; Rudy Dickson
- Nationality: Mexico (Skiing); Canada (Dual Citizenship)
- Born: July 11, 1997 (age 29) Puerto Vallarta, Mexico

Sport
- Sport: Skiing

Rodolfo "Rudy" Roberto Dickson Sommers (born 11 July 1997) is a Mexican Canadian alpine skier representing Mexico. He was the first Mexican to win an international ski race, winning in Super-G in January 2015.

== Personal life ==
Dickson was born on July 11, 1997, in Puerto Vallarta, Mexico. He was orphaned at nine months, and as an orphan, he was referred to as "Jesús de Dios" (English: Jesus of God). He was named Rodolfo Roberto after his Mexican godfather and his Canadian adoptive grandfather, Brian Robert Dickson. Dickson was adopted by a Canadian couple at age three. He was later diagnosed with learning disabilities, having not spoken and still wearing diapers. He moved to Oakville, Ontario, Canada, with his adoptive parents.

In 2015, after graduating from National Ski Academy, Collingwood, he moved to Europe to enter full-time FIS ski training with Ambition Ski Racing, Leogang, Austria.

As of 2017, Dickson lives in Vancouver, British Columbia, Canada.

== Skiing career ==
Dickson started skiing at age 6, on a family vacation to Mont Tremblant Resort in Quebec. He continued skiing the Milton Heights Racing Club in Ontario and won several medals and trophies. He graduated from Mountain View Public School in Collingwood, Ontario in 2011. He later joined the National Ski Academy under academy head Jurg Gfeller, located in Collingwood, Ontario, where he remained for five years. While at the academy, he won bronze, silver and gold medals in K2 and U18 age classification races. In 2015, the final year of academy, he won an Overall FIS Gold Medal at a race at Whiteface in New York State. The win at Whiteface in January 2015 represents the first time a Mexican national has won an international race on a FIS circuit. He graduated from the academy with the highest FIS points of the class of 2015 for the 2014-2015 FIS season and with honours as an Ontario Scholar. After graduating from high school, he then moved to train in Switzerland and the United States, as well as Canada. In October 2015, he moved to Ambition Ski Racing Academy in the UK and started training full-time at the FIS program in Leogang, Austria, representing Mexico as a FIS alpine ski racer.

Dickson qualified for the 2018 Winter Olympics in men's giant slalom and slalom. His Olympic effort is self-funded. He represents the Mexican team of Alpine skiing, along with Sarah Schleper. Another two athletes also hope to make the Olympics for Mexico, Robby Franco in freestyle skiing, Sandra Hillen in snowboard. He qualified for the 2018 Olympics, alongside alpinist Sarah Schleper, freestyler Roberto Franco, and cross-country skier Germán Madrazo.
