= Adam Kotzmann =

Czech alpine skier

Personal information
- Nationality: Czech
- Born: 8 April 1993 (age 32)
- Height: 1.71 m (5 ft 7 in)
- Weight: 71 kg (157 lb)

Sport
- Sport: Alpine skiing

Adam Kotzmann (born 8 April 1993) is a Czech alpine skier. He competed in the 2018 Winter Olympics.
