= Albin Tahiri =

Kosovo Albanian alpine ski racer (born 1989)

Personal information
- Born: 15 February 1989 (age 37) Slovenj Gradec, SR Slovenia, SFR Yugoslavia

Skiing career
- Sport: Alpine skiing ♂
- Club: SK Crna
- Disciplines: Combined, downhill, giant slalom, slalom and Super-G
- World Cup debut: 4 March 2017 (age 28)

Olympics
- Teams: 2 – (2018, 2022)

World Championships
- Teams: 3 – (2017–2021)

Albin Tahiri (born 15 February 1989) is a Kosovo Albanian World Cup alpine ski racer. He represented the Kosovo Olympic Committee for the first time in Winter Olympic Games in February 2018. Tahiri is a dentist by profession and he trained in Slovenia, Austria and Italy.

== Early life ==
Tahiri was born in SR Slovenia from Kosovo Albanian father and Slovenian mother.

== Career ==
He started skiing at the age of 7 in Slovenia. In June 2009, he changed his nationality and has since been competing in Kosovo. He was the first athlete to represent Kosovo at the Winter Olympics. He was the Kosovo's flag bearer during the Parade of Nations of the opening ceremony in Pyeongchang.

=== World Cup results ===
==== Results per discipline ====
Discipline	WC starts	WC Top 30	WC Top 15	WC Top 5	WC Podium	Best result		
Discipline	WC starts	WC Top 30	WC Top 15	WC Top 5	WC Podium	Date	Location	Place
Slalom	2	0	0	0	0	10 March 2019	Kranjska Gora, Slovenia	54th
Giant slalom	3	0	0	0	0	3 March 2018	Kranjska Gora, Slovenia	44th
Super-G	0	0	0	0	0			
Downhill	1	0	0	0	0	13 January 2018	Wengen, Switzerland	55th
Combined	1	0	0	0	0	12 January 2018	Wengen, Switzerland	43rd
Total	7	0	0	0	0			

- Standings through 8 February 2021

=== World Championship results ===
Year
Year	Age	Slalom	Giant; Slalom	Super G	Downhill	Combined
2017	28	51	DNF1	49	51	45
2019	30	61	51	45	55	DNF2
2021	32	32	37	—	—	—

=== Olympic results ===
Year
Year	Age	Slalom	Giant; Slalom	Super G	Downhill	Combined
2018	29	39	56	47	50	37
2022	32		30	—	35	15

Winter Olympics
Preceded by First	Flagbearer for Kosovo; Pyeongchang 2018; Beijing 2022	Succeeded by Incumbent
