= Kristaps Zvejnieks =

Latvian alpine skier (born 1992)

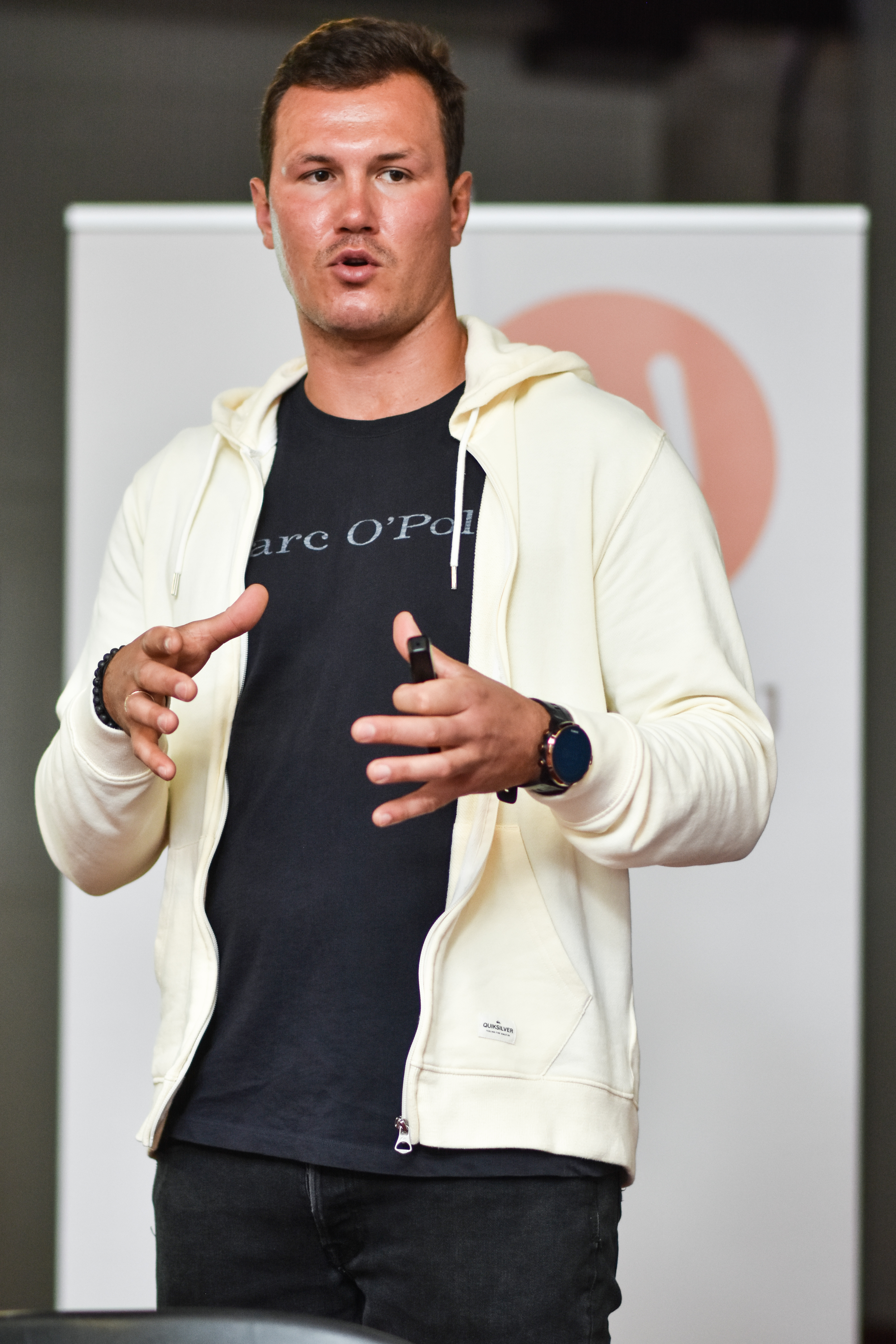
- Zvejnieks in September 2022

Personal information
- Born: 15 February 1992 (age 34) Riga, Latvia
- Height: 185 cm (6 ft 1 in)
- Website: sportadarbnica.lv

Skiing career
- Sport: Alpine skiing
- Club: SK Virsotne
- Disciplines: Downhill, super-G, giant slalom, slalom, combined
- World Cup debut: 24 January, 2012 (age 20)

Olympics
- Teams: 3 – (2010, 2014, 2018)

World Championships
- Teams: 3 – (2011, 2013, 2015, )
Medal record
Men's alpine skiing
Representing Latvia
Winter Universiade
Gold medal – first place	2017 Almaty	Combined

Kristaps Zvejnieks (born 15 February 1992 in Riga) is an Alpine ski racer and inline Alpine slalom racer from Latvia. He competed for Latvia at the 2010 Winter Olympics. He competed in slalom and giant slalom and his best result was a 37th place in the slalom. He competes in FIS, CIT, EC and WC levels. He had his first World Cup start in Schladming on 24 January 2012.

== Alpine skiing career ==
He was born to Jana Zvejniece and Raivo Zvejnieks in Riga, Latvia, and grew up there. The closest ski area was in Sigulda, 60 km from his house. The biggest skiing slopes in Sigulda are Pilsētas trase, Kaķīškalns and Kordes trase, all more than 100 m above the sea level with a vertical drop of 80 – 90 m and length of 275 – 350 m. He began skiing at three and racing at eight. In his first race he finished in 6th place. He made his first start in a World Cup event during the 2012 World Cup season in the slalom at Schladming.

=== 2008 season ===
Zvejnieks started his FIS career in Geilo, Norway, with a GS race on 6 December 2008, finishing in 65th position with 127.47 FIS points. Two days later, he finished the slalom in 31st position with start number 141, gaining 78.89 FIS points in his first slalom FIS race. In the whole season, Zvejnieks had 40 races and he achieved to 50.42 FIS points in slalom. This was the first season with his trainer, the former Austrian and Japanese Olympic coach, the Austrian Peter Prodinger. After his first FIS races he was added to the Latvia National ski A team.

=== 2009 season ===
On 16 July 2008, during the last training run in Mölltaler Gletscher, Austria, Zvejnieks crashed badly and broke his leg (fibula and tibia). He was determined to get back to skis as soon as possible, but it was too early. On 3 February 2009, he broke the same leg again. After several operations and a long time recovering, he began skiing again back in Mölltaler Gletcher on 14 October 2009.

=== 2010 season ===
Zvejnieks recorded his first FIS race podium and victory at Spindleruv Mlyn, Czech Republic, in December with 39.10 FIS points. He qualified for the 2010 Winter Olympics on 26 January. In Vancouver, he competed in giant slalom and slalom disciplines. In giant slalom he finished in 62nd position,. In slalom he was 37th with +11.97 seconds from the leader Giuliano Razzoli. He was one of the youngest athletes to perform in Alpine skiing when he turned 18 years old during the Olympics.

=== 2011 season ===
Zvejnieks started with a podium in the Levi FIS race. He finished in third position with 33.66 FIS points. During the season he had 47 races.

=== 2012 season ===
Zvejnieks started the 2012 season with 34.37 FIS points (567 in World ranking) in slalom. He made his first start in a World Cup slalom event at Schladming where he was disqualified for struggling a gate. Schladming seemed to be a turning point for Zvejnieks' success. He competed in many races and had great results. He moved down from 34.37 to 19.61 FIS Points in slalom at an Austrian Cup race in Gaal, where he finished 1st and 2nd in two-day races. He finished 1st in the German Junior race in Lenggries. At the end of the season he finished 2nd in the Norway National Championships with 14.55 FIS points. He finished season 2011/2012 on 16 April in Finland with 15.84 FIS Points in Slalom (156 in World ranking).

=== 2013 season ===
In 2013 season Zvejnieks got his best FIS points, 12.41 (118 in World Ranking) in slalom discipline.

=== 2014 season ===
Zvejnieks started in Sochi winter Olympics. He got his best place in giant slalom discipline (43 place), but got disqualified in Slalom after a mistake. He didn't make any improvements in FIS points list in Slalom, but he got better points in giant slalom discipline.

=== 2015 season ===
In 2015 Zvejnieks started in 5 World Cup Slalom races, but did not qualify for Top 30. Zvejnieks got better FIS points in Slalom. For first he made his points up to 10.72 FIS points in FIS races in Chamonix, France, but in late 2015 season, in April, Zvejnieks made Latvia's best FIS points ever with moving up to 9.57 FIS points in Slalom, which gave him 66th place in World Ranking before 2016 season start.

=== Other sports and achievements ===
Zvejnieks plays golf during summer time at GC Viesturi in Latvia. In May 2012, he started in the Ski & Golf World Championships in Zell am See, Austria, with the 4th best time in skiing. As a better skier than golf player, he finished in 15th place overall in the men's professional group.

He is overall winner of Latvian Cup 2008–2012, and Baltic Cup winner 2010–2012.

Zvejnieks was the inline Alpine slalom World Champion and World Cup overall winner in the 2012 Inline Alpine Slalom season.

== Inline Alpine slalom career ==
Zvejnieks started inline Alpine as a part of ski training in summer. As a Latvian with the biggest mountain of 312 m above sea level, it was a good part of physical and psychological training for summer. He started to attend international European races in the 2005 season. In 2008, he won his first European Cup in Smiltene, Latvia.

== Alpine skiing career results ==
=== FIS points at the end of the season ===
Season	Races in season	Slalom	Giant slalom	Super G	Downhill	Combined
2008	40	50,42	86,89	72,97	–	104,55
2009	12	48,14	81.27	71,39	–	97,78
2010	41	38,99	57,54	60,55	72,53	115,25
2011	47	34,95	47,27	62,53	73,59	71,35
2012	47	15,84	31,49	58,59	69,62	42,04
2013	48	12,41	23,66	45,36	69,62	42,04
2014	43	12,41	16,85	45,36	83,25	62,65
2015	41	9,57	21,57	102,06	124,88	93,98

== Inline Alpine slalom career results ==
=== World Cup races ===
- 32 races – 15 podiums,

Season	Date	Location	Discipline	Position
2011	5 Jun 2011	Genoa, Italia	Slalom	DNS
2011	3 Jul 2011	Degmarn, Germany	Slalom	5
2011	9 Jul 2011	Tuttlingen, Germany	Slalom	DNS
2011	13 Aug 2011	Neukirchen, Austria	Slalom	DNS
2011	28 Aug 20111	Turnov, Czech Republic	Slalom	1
2011	11 Sep 2011	Nemcicky, Czech Republic	Slalom	1
2012	17 Jun 2012	Turnov, Czech Republic	Slalom	1
2012	1 Jul 2012	Degmarn, Germany	Slalom	5
2012	15 Jul 2012	Sigulda, Latvia	Slalom	2
2012	18 Aug 2012	Chammunster, Germany	Giant slalom	DNQ2
2012	19 Aug 2012	Chammunster, Germany	Slalom	1
2012	8 Sep 2012	Stenenbronn, Germany	Slalom	2
2013	2 Jun 2013	Genova, Italy	Slalom	1
2013	9 Jun 2013	Oberhundem, Germany	Slalom	1
2013	23 Jun 2013	Jirkov, Czech Republic	Slalom	1
2013	13 Jul 2013	Tuttlingen, Germany	Slalom	1
2013	11 Aug 2013	Uttendorf, Austria	Slalom	DNF
2013	8 Sep 2013	Nemcicky, Czech Republic	Slalom	16
2014	17 May 2014	Steinenbron, Germany	Slalom	DNS
2014	6 Jun 2014	Turnov, Czech Republic	Slalom	DNS
2014	22 Jun 2014	Jirkov, Czech Republic	Slalom	DNS
2014	6 Jul 2014	Degmarn, Germany	Slalom	2
2014	11 Sep 2014	Oberhundem, Germany	Giant slalom	12
2014	14 Sep 2014	Oberhundem, Germany	Slalom	2
2015	21 Jun 2015	Jirkov, Czech Republic	Slalom	DNS
2015	26 Jul 2015	Pisogne, Italy	Slalom	DNF
2015	18 Aug 2015	Villablino, Spain	Slalom	2
2015	23 Aug 2015	Bramberg, Austria	Slalom	DNS
2015	5 Sep 2015	Nemcicky, Czech Republic	Slalom	DNF
2016	5 Jun 2015	Unterensingen, Germany	Slalom	3
2016	19 Jun 2015	Turnov, Czech Republic	Slalom	1
2016	26 Jun 2015	Jirkov, Czech Republic	Slalom	DNS

=== Inline Alpine slalom season standings ===
Season	WC races	Podiums	Overall
2010	4	0	38
2011	3	2	5
2012	5	4	1
2013	6	4	1
2014	3	2	7
2015	3	1	12
