= Itamar Biran =

Israeli Olympic alpine ski racer

Itamar Biran איתמר בירן
Personal information
- Born: 3 March 1998 (age 28) London
- Height: 1.71 m (5 ft 7 in)

Skiing career
- Sport: Alpine skiing
- Club: Israel Ski club
- Disciplines: Giant slalom, super-G, slalom, combined

Olympics
- Teams: 1 (2018 Winter Olympics)

World Championships
- Teams: 4 – (2015, 2017, 2019, 2021)

Itamar Biran (Hebrew: איתמר בירן; born 3 March 1998) is an Israeli Olympic alpine ski racer who represents Israel in international competitions. He competes in giant slalom, super-G, slalom and Combined.

== Biography ==
Itamar Biran is a dual U.K./Israel citizen, and is Jewish.

When Biran was six years old, his family moved to Verbier, Switzerland. They then moved to Israel, and subsequently he attended University College School in London in the United Kingdom. He now lives and trains in Les Houches, France, and in Switzerland. He is studying in Bocconi University in Milan, Italy,

He said "I started skiing like all Israelis do: At Club Meds in Europe." Biran started to ski at age three, and to compete at age 12. His ski club is the Israel Ski Club, and his coach is Didier Schmidt.

== Skiing career ==
Biran competed on behalf of Israel at the 2016 Winter Youth Olympics in Lillehammer, Norway, and came in 23rd in the Alpine Combined, and 38th in the Super-G. In January 2017 he won the Italian National Junior Slalom Race, in Valtournenche. In February 2017 he came in second in the Bosnia and Herzegovina National Championships in slalom, and third in the Bosnia and Herzegovina Junior National Championships in slalom. In March 2017, he came in second in the CIT Giant slalom in Villard de Lans, France. In November 2017 he won the CIT Slalom in Val Thorens, France.

Biran competed at the 2015 World Championships in Beaver Creek, USA, and qualified for the final race in the giant slalom in which he finished 62nd. He also competed in the men's slalom final, but did not finish the first run. He was the only male Israeli athlete and the youngest participant at these championships.

He was among two participants who represented Israel at the 2016 Winter Youth Olympics in Lillehammer.

He represented Israel at the 2018 Winter Olympics, having raced in the slalom on 18 February and in the giant slalom on 22 February.

His best result at a major international event came at the FIS Alpine World Ski Championships 2019 in Åre where he finished 39th in the Slalom.

Biran is 6 feet 2 inches tall and weighs 176 pounds.
