= Choe Myong-gwang =

North Korean alpine skier (born 1990)

Personal information
- Nationality: North Korean
- Born: 7 January 1990 (age 35)

Sport
- Sport: Alpine skiing

Choe Myong-gwang (born 7 January 1990, Korean: 최명광) is a North Korean alpine skier. He competed in the 2018 Winter Olympics.
