= Michał Jasiczek =

Polish alpine skier (born 1994)

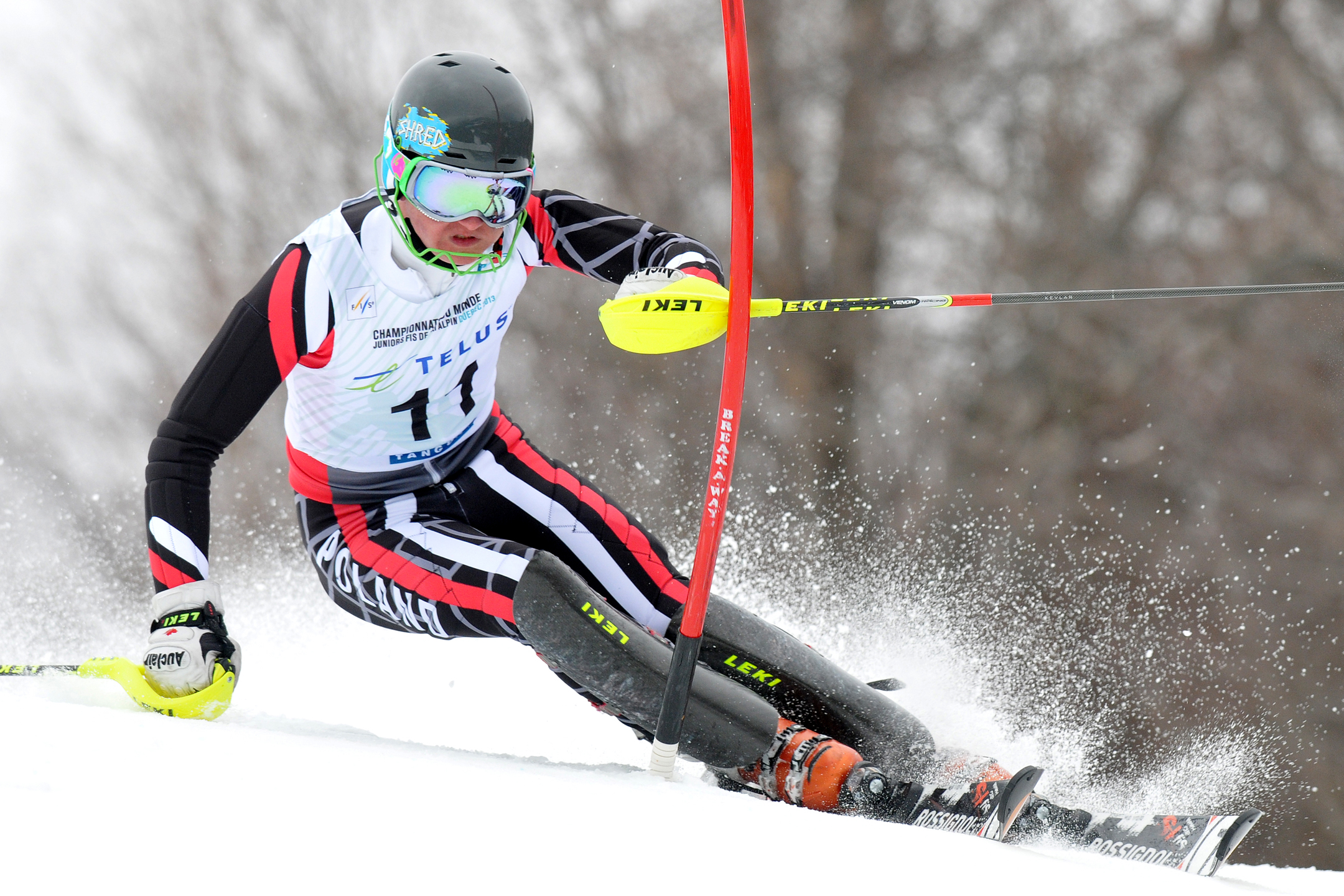
- Jasiczek in 2013

Personal information
- Born: 13 March 1994 (age 32) Lublin, Poland
- Height: 1.83 m (6 ft 0 in)
- Weight: 74 kg (163 lb)

Michał Jasiczek (born 13 March 1994 in Lublin, Poland) is an alpine skier from Poland. He competed for Poland at the 2014 Winter Olympics in the alpine skiing events.
