= Dominic Demschar =

Australian alpine skier (born 1993)

Personal information
- Born: 19 May 1993 (age 33) Oberndorf, Austria

Skiing career
- Country: Australia
- Sport: Alpine skiing
- Disciplines: Slalom, Giant slalom
- World Cup debut: 3 December 2017

Olympics
- Teams: 2 (2014, 2018)
- Medals: 0

World Championships
- Teams: 1 (2015)
- Medals: 0

World Cup
- Seasons: 1 (2018)
- Wins: 0
- Podiums: 0

Dominic Demschar (born 19 May 1993 in Oberndorf, Austria) is an alpine skier who competed for Australia at the 2014 and 2018 Winter Olympics in the alpine skiing events. He has lived the majority of his life in Park City, Utah, in the United States and attends the University of Utah.
