= Kang Song-il =

North Korean alpine skier (born 1994)

Personal information
- Nationality: North Korean
- Born: 27 July 1994 (age 31)

Sport
- Sport: Alpine skiing

- Kang Song-il
- Hangul: 강성일
- RR: Gang Seongil
- MR: Kang Sŏngil

Kang Song-il (born 27 July 1994) is a North Korean alpine skier. He competed in the 2018 Winter Olympics.
