= Olympic Committee of Kosovo =

National Olympic Committee

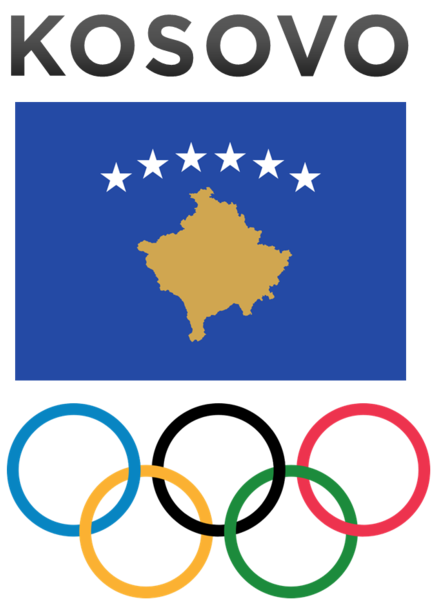
- Country: Kosovo
- Code: KOS
- Created: 1992
- Recognized: 9 December 2014
- Continental Association: EOC
- Headquarters: Pristina
- President: Ismet Krasniqi
- Secretary General: Besim Aliti
- Website: noc-kosovo.org

The Olympic Committee of Kosovo (Albanian: Komiteti Olimpik i Kosovës, KOK; Serbian: Олимпијски комитет Косова, Olimpijski komitet Kosova, OKK; IOC Code: KOS) is the National Olympic Committee representing Kosovo. Officially established in 1992, the OCK became a full member of the International Olympic Committee and the Olympic Movement on 9 December 2014. It is responsible for Kosovo's participation at the Olympic Games.

== History ==
Logo of the Kosovo Olympic Committee used prior to 2008

The Olympic Committee of Kosovo (OCK; abbreviated KOK in Albanian) was officially established in 1992 and acknowledged as the highest sports institution in Kosovo in 2003 by the Law on Sports (Law No. 2003/24) passed by the Assembly of Kosovo. The United Nations-led administration in Kosovo previously established a working group to engage with the IOC to allow athletes to participate in the Olympic Games. Due to its status, Kosovar athletes were not allowed to compete under the flag of Kosovo, until the recognition in 2014. Therefore, during the 2012 Summer Olympics, Kosovar judoka and world champion, Majlinda Kelmendi had to compete for Albania instead. Kosovar athletes of Serbian ethnicity participated as part of Serbia and Montenegro and Serbia.

In April 2013, the Brussels Agreement was concluded between the Serbian and Kosovar governments. In October 2014 the International Olympic Committee provisionally recognised the Olympic Committee of Kosovo and gave it full membership on 9 December 2014. At that time, Kosovo was not a member or observer state of the United Nations, but it has gained diplomatic recognition as a sovereign state by 118 out of 193 UN member states.

Kosovo's first ever participation in any Olympic competition was when they participated at the European Games 2015 in Baku. In which Nora Gjakova won the first medal in the history for Kosovo, at the European Games in Judo at the 2015 European Games – Women's 57 kg. In which she could won Bronze. Kosovo participated for the first time in the Rio de Janeiro games of the 2016 Summer Olympics. Kosovo won their first Olympic gold medal in their first participation in any Olympic Games, in the Summer Olympics in Rio de Janeiro in 2016. The medal has been won in judo by Mailinda Kelmendi in the category of -52 kg. Kosovo participated in the following European Games 2019 in Minsk. They won all three Medals in Judo at the 2019 European Games. Majlinda Kelmendi won Gold in the 52 kg category. Nora Gjakova won Silver in the Women's 57 kg and Loriana Kuka won Bronze in the Women's 78 kg. Kosovo participate for the second time in their Olympic history at the 2020 Summer Olympics in Tokio. Kosovo won two Gold medals by Distria Krasniqi and Nora Gjakova in Judo. They would finish the Summer Olympics in the 42 place. So far their best result as an Olympic Nation.

Kosovo participated at the 2015 European Games in Baku and participated at the 2016 Summer Olympics in Rio de Janeiro, Brazil. Nora Kelmendi won bronze in the Women's 57kg category in Judo. Judoka Majlinda Kelmendi became the first Kosovar athlete to win a medal of any colour when she won gold in the women's 52kg weight division at the Games. The committee was represented for the first time at the Winter Olympics at PyeongChang 2018 by skier Albin Tahiri.

Kosovo competed at the 2022 Winter Olympics held in Beijing. Its Olympic team consisted of two athletes, one male and one female. Albin Tahiri competed in four alpine ski events. Kiana Kryeziu became the first woman in the history of Kosovo to compete at the Winter Olympics, in the women's slalom. In 2022 Albin Tahiri achieved the best result for Kosovo at the Winter Olympics in alpine skiing in the men's combined event, with a 15th-place finish. His second best finish came in the Men's giant slalom where he finished 30th.

Prior to the IOC recognition, Special Olympics Kosovo was established in 2002 and Kosovar athletes have taken part in the Special Olympics since 2003. Athletes from Kosovo participated at the 4th World Dwarf Games in Rambouillet, France in 2005, in the 2015 World Aquatics Championships in Kazan, Russia, in the 2015 IHF Emerging Nations Championship, also in the European Games, and Mediterranean Games etc. A Paralympic Committee was also formed which gained provisional membership of the International Paralympic Committee in July 2022 and full membership in September 2023.

== Presidents ==
Chairperson	Period	Time in office
Veton Surroi	27 May 1992 – 26 May 1996	3 years, 365 days
Besim Hasani	26 May 1996 – 25 March 2021	24 years, 303 days
Ismet Krasniqi	25 March 2021 – Present	5 years, 196 days

== See also ==
- Kosovo at the Olympics
- Membership of Kosovo in international sports federations
