= Carlo Janka =

Swiss alpine skier (born 1986)

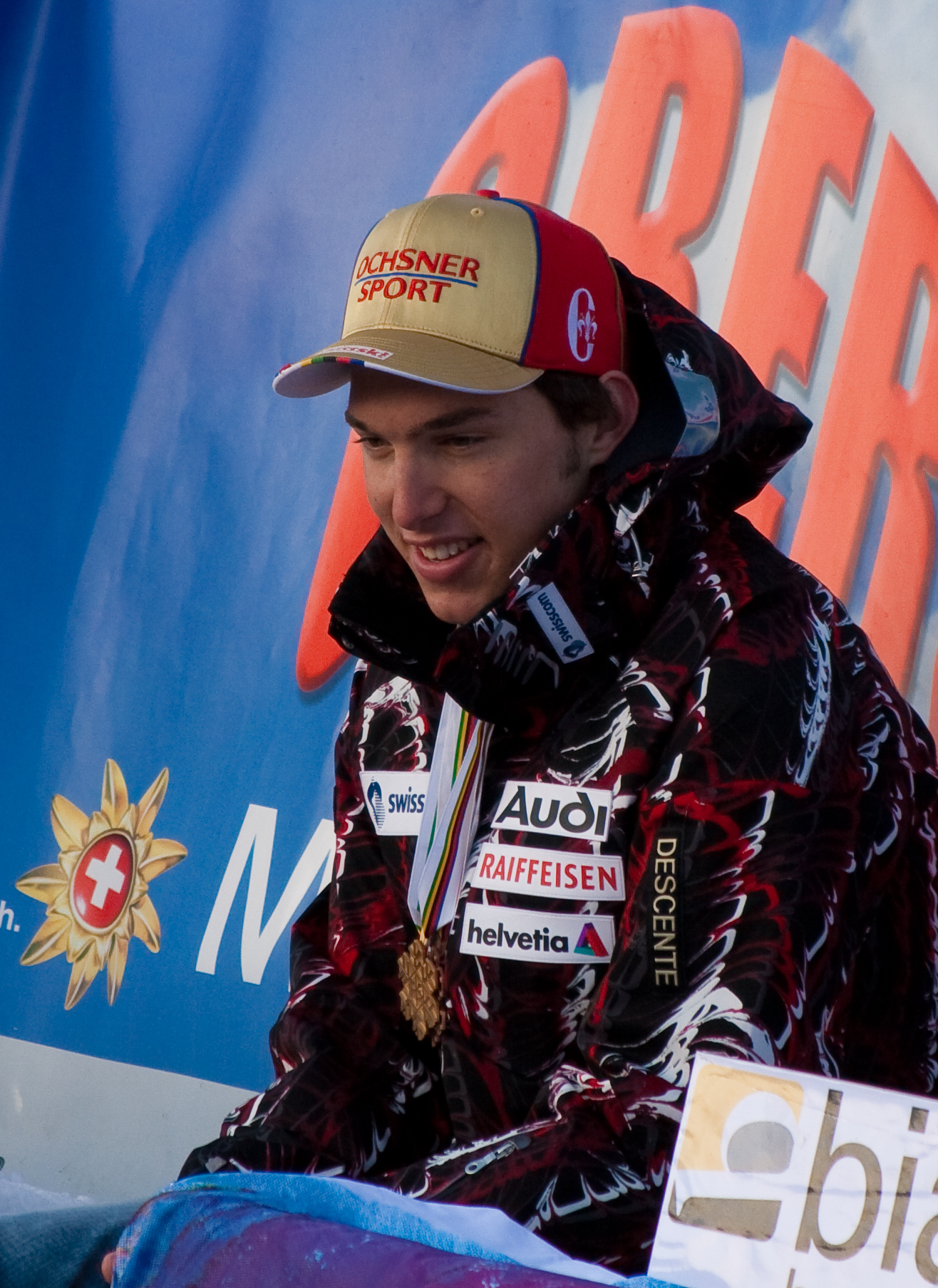
- Janka in February 2009

Personal information
- Born: 15 October 1986 (age 39) Obersaxen, Graubünden, Switzerland
- Height: 1.85 m (6 ft 1 in)
- Website: carlo-janka.ch

Skiing career
- Sport: Alpine skiing
- Club: Obersaxen
- Retired: 15 January 2022 (age 35)
- Disciplines: Downhill, super-G, giant slalom, combined
- World Cup debut: 21 December 2005 (age 19)

Olympics
- Teams: 3 – (2010, 2014, 2018)
- Medals: 1 (1 gold)

World Championships
- Teams: 7 – (2009–2021)
- Medals: 2 (1 gold)

World Cup
- Seasons: 15 – (2006–2017, 2019–2021)
- Wins: 11 – (3 DH, 1 SG, 4 GS, 3 SC)
- Podiums: 28
- Overall titles: 1 – (2010)
- Discipline titles: 1 – (SC: 2009)
Medal record
Men's alpine skiing
Representing Switzerland
World Cup race podiums
Event	1st	2nd	3rd
Giant slalom	4	2	0
Super-G	1	2	0
Downhill	3	1	7
Combined	3	2	2
Parallel	0	1	0
Total	11	8	9
International alpine ski competitions
Event	1st	2nd	3rd
Olympic Games	1	0	0
World Championships	1	0	1
Total	2	0	1
Olympic Games
Gold medal – first place	2010 Vancouver	Giant slalom
World Championships
Gold medal – first place	2009 Val d'Isère	Giant slalom
Bronze medal – third place	2009 Val d'Isère	Downhill

Carlo Janka (born 15 October 1986) is a Swiss former alpine ski racer. Born in Obersaxen, in the canton of Graubünden, he had the winter sports facilities right in front of his home. Janka has won gold medals at both the Winter Olympics and the World Championships, as well as one World Cup overall title, one discipline title and also, one unofficial alpine combined title.

In 2013, Janka set a World Cup speed record in the downhill part of the super combined event in Wengen, Switzerland. He reached a maximum speed of 158.77 km/h (98.66 mph) on the Haneggschuss, the fastest section of the classic Lauberhorn slope, on 18 January.

== Ski racing career ==
Janka competed in his first international FIS race in December 2001 at age 15. Not until four years later did he reach the podium, but success came in all four disciplines. Janka began racing on the Europa Cup circuit in January 2004. He earned his first two World Cup starts in December 2005 but did not finish either race. At the Junior World Championships in 2006 at Mt. Ste. Anne, Quebec, Canada, he won the bronze medal in giant slalom, and he finished the 2007 season in fourth place in the overall Europa Cup standings.

Janka scored his first World Cup points in the giant slalom at Alta Badia, Italy, on 17 December 2006, finishing in 20th place. But his World Cup breakthrough began two years later, on 29 November 2008, when he came out of the 65th starting position to finish a surprising second place in the downhill at Lake Louise. Two weeks later, he gained his first World Cup victory in a giant slalom race at Val d'Isère, France, followed the next month by a victory in the Lauberhorn super-combined in Wengen. A month later, he won the gold medal in giant slalom and the bronze in downhill at the 2009 World Championships in Val d'Isère.

On the weekend of 4–6 December, 2009, Janka achieved a remarkable feat by winning the super-combined, downhill, and giant slalom on the challenging Birds of Prey course at Beaver Creek, Colorado. Janka was the first to win three World Cup races in a single weekend since Hermann Maier at the same location ten years earlier. On 16 January 2010, Janka won the Lauberhorn downhill in Wengen, the longest and fastest race on the World Cup tour, a day after nearly repeating his 2009 win in the super-combined by narrowly placing second behind Bode Miller.

On 23 February 2010, Janka won the gold medal in the giant slalom at the 2010 Vancouver Olympics at Whistler Creekside in Whistler, British Columbia, Canada.

At the World Cup finals in Garmisch, Germany, in March 2010, he became the fourth Swiss racer to win the World Cup overall title. He clinched the title by winning the downhill and giant slalom, which left his nearest opponent, Benjamin Raich, 106 points back with one race remaining, an insurmountable margin.

In October 2010, Janka was awarded the Skieur d'Or Award by members of the International Association of Ski Journalists for his performances during the previous season, thereby becoming the first Swiss male skier to receive the honor since Pirmin Zurbriggen won it back in 1990.

Following the 2011 World Championships, Janka had some health problems but recovered well and resumed training five days later, winning the giant slalom at Kranjska Gora, Slovenia, on 5 March for his sole victory of the 2011 season.

Janka switched equipment following the 2013–14 season, from Atomic to Rossignol.

== World Cup results ==
=== Season titles ===
Season
Season	Discipline
2009	Combined
2010	Overall
2015	Combined ^{A}

^{A} Unofficial, a crystal globe for AC was not awarded between 2013 and 2015.

=== Season standings ===
Season
Season	Age	Overall	Slalom	Giant; Slalom	Super G	Downhill	Combined
2007	20	130	—	40	—	—	—
2008	21	64	—	28	46	46	31
2009	22	7	—	6	16	16	1
2010	23	1	—	2	6	2	2
2011	24	3	—	5	6	9	6
2012	25	24	—	16	28	17	19
2013	26	48	—	48	27	38	4
2014	27	18	—	25	20	17	10
2015	28	10	—	12	11	17	1
2016	29	9	—	29	5	9	7
2017	30	12	—	20	19	7	30
2018	31	injured					
2019	32	58	—	—	41	19	29
2020	33	28	—	—	38	8	—
2021	34	61	—	—	—	13	—
2022	35	116	—	—	—	40	—

Standings through 20 March 2022

=== Race podiums ===
- 11 wins – (3 DH, 1 SG, 4 GS, 3 AC)
- 28 podiums – (11 DH, 3 SG, 6 GS, 1 PG, 7 AC)

Season
Season	Date	Location	Discipline	Rank
2009	29 Nov 2008	Lake Louise, Canada	Downhill	2nd
2009	13 Dec 2008	Val d'Isere, France	Giant slalom	1st
2009	16 Jan 2009	Wengen, Switzerland	Super combined	1st
2009	22 Feb 2009	Sestriere, Italy	Super combined	3rd
2010	25 Oct 2009	Sölden, Austria	Giant slalom	3rd
2010	28 Nov 2009	Lake Louise, Canada	Downhill	3rd
2010	4 Dec 2009	(United States) Beaver Creek, USA	Super combined	1st
2010	5 Dec 2009	(United States) Beaver Creek, USA	Downhill	1st
2010	6 Dec 2009	(United States) Beaver Creek, USA	Giant slalom	1st
2010	18 Dec 2009	Val Gardena, Italy	Super-G	2nd
2010	15 Jan 2010	Wengen, Switzerland	Super combined	2nd
2010	16 Jan 2010	Wengen, Switzerland	Downhill	1st
2010	10 Mar 2010	Garmisch-Partenkirchen, Germany	Downhill	1st
2010	12 Mar 2010	Garmisch-Partenkirchen, Germany	Giant slalom	1st
2011	28 Nov 2010	Lake Louise, Canada	Super-G	2nd
2011	14 Jan 2011	Wengen, Switzerland	Super combined	2nd
2011	15 Jan 2011	Wengen, Switzerland	Downhill	3rd
2011	6 Feb 2011	Hinterstoder, Austria	Giant slalom	3rd
2011	5 Mar 2011	Kranjska Gora, Slovenia	Giant slalom	1st
2013	18 Jan 2013	Wengen, Switzerland	Super combined	3rd
2015	16 Jan 2015	Wengen, Switzerland	Super combined	1st
2015	18 Jan 2015	Wengen, Switzerland	Downhill	3rd
2016	23 Jan 2016	Kitzbühel, Austria	Downhill	3rd
2016	7 Feb 2016	(South Korea) Jeongseon, South Korea	Super-G	1st
2017	19 Dec 2016	Alta Badia, Italy	Parallel-G	2nd
2017	15 Mar 2017	(United States) Aspen, USA	Downhill	3rd
2020	30 Nov 2019	Lake Louise, Canada	Downhill	3rd
2020	7 Mar 2020	Kvitfjell, Norway	Downhill	3rd

== World Championships results ==
Year	Age	Slalom	Giant slalom	Super-G	Downhill	Combined
2009	22	—	1	9	3	DNS2
2011	24	—	7	7	—	—
2013	26	—	DNS2	25	19	8
2015	28	—	—	12	9	6
2017	30	—	—	8	28	7
2019	32	—	—	—	35	18
2021	34	—	—	—	9	—

== Olympic results ==
Year	Age	Slalom	Giant slalom	Super-G	Downhill	Combined
2010	23	—	1	8	11	4
2014	27	—	13	22	6	8
2018	31	—	—	—	—	15
