= 2014–15 FIS Alpine Ski World Cup =

International sports competition

2014–15 FIS Alpine Ski World Cup champions
Discipline	Men	Women
Overall	(Austria) Marcel Hirscher	(Austria) Anna Fenninger
Downhill	(Norway) Kjetil Jansrud	(United States) Lindsey Vonn
Super-G	(Norway) Kjetil Jansrud	(United States) Lindsey Vonn
Giant slalom	(Austria) Marcel Hirscher	(Austria) Anna Fenninger
Slalom	(Austria) Marcel Hirscher	(United States) Mikaela Shiffrin
Nations Cup	Austria	Austria
- Nations Cup Overall: Austria

Competition
Locations	19 venues	16 venues
Individual	37 events	32 events
Mixed	1 event	1 event
Cancelled	1 event	2 events
Rescheduled	2 events	8 events

Overall Champions

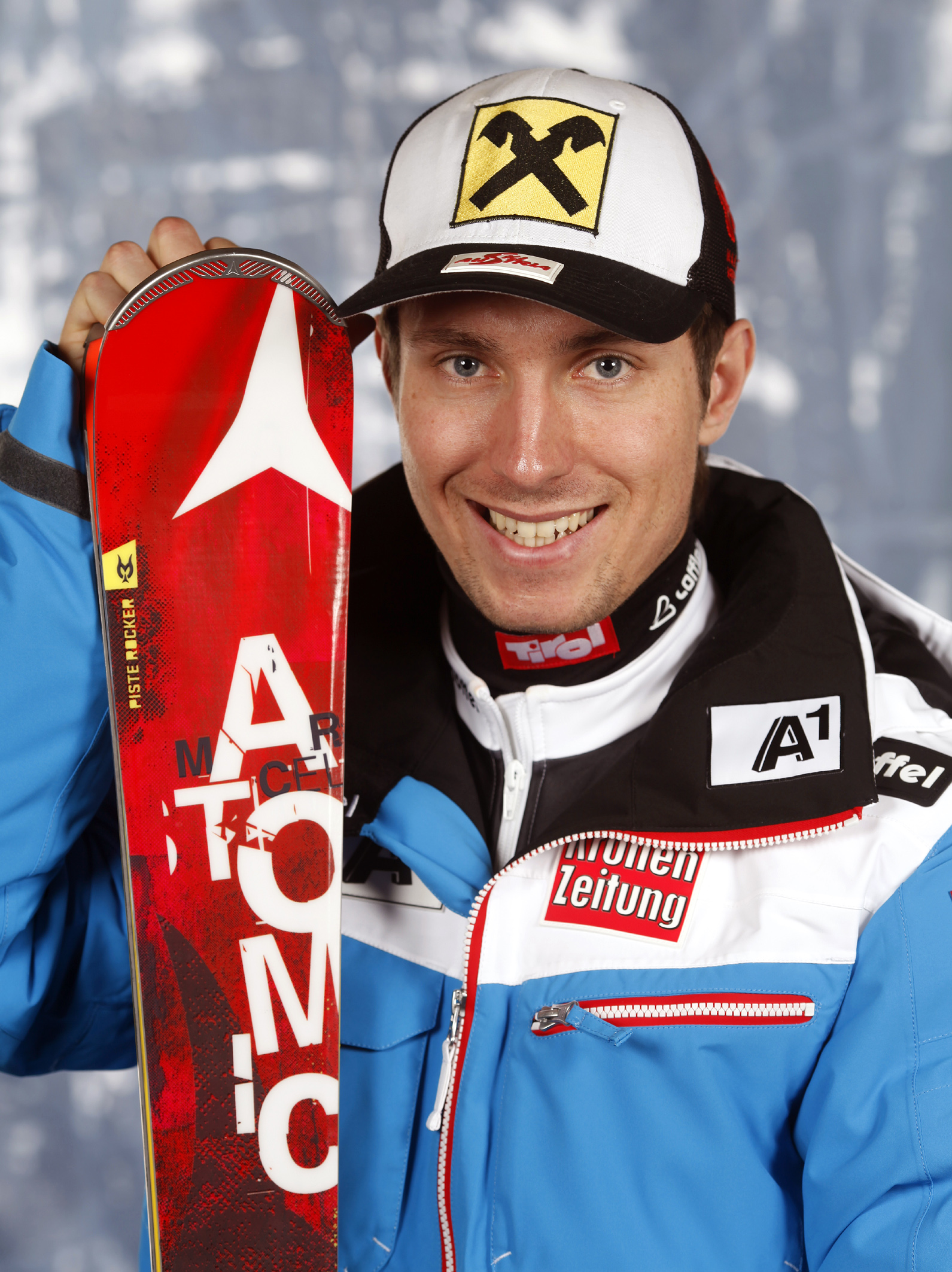
Marcel Hirscher won the overall title for the fourth successive year.

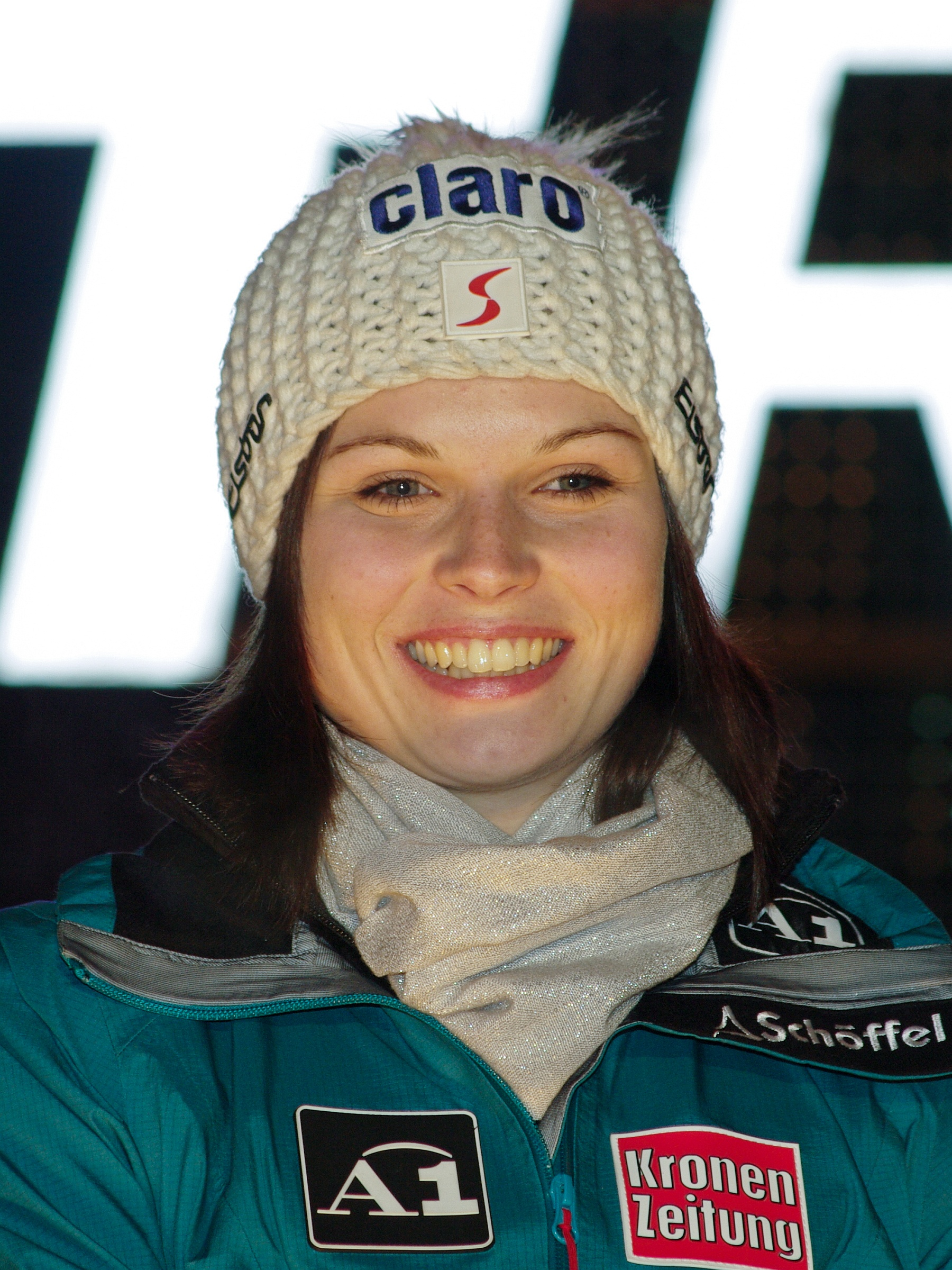
Anna Fenninger won the overall title for the second successive year.

The 49th World Cup season began on 25 October 2014, in Sölden, Austria, and concluded on 22 March 2015 at the World Cup finals in Meribel, France. The defending overall champions from the 2014 season - Marcel Hirscher and Anna Fenninger, both of Austria, defended their titles successfully. The season was interrupted by the World Championships in February, in the United States at Vail/Beaver Creek, Colorado. Combined events were not awarded as a discipline trophy.

== Calendar ==
=== Men ===
Event key: DH – Downhill, SL – Slalom, GS – Giant slalom, SG – Super giant slalom, AC – Alpine Combined, CE –City Event (Parallel)
Race	Season	Date	Place	Type	Winner	Second	Third	Details
1556	1	26 October 2014	(Austria) Sölden	GS _{372}	(Austria) Marcel Hirscher	(Germany) Fritz Dopfer	(France) Alexis Pinturault	
1557	2	16 November 2014	(Finland) Levi	SL _{440}	(Norway) Henrik Kristoffersen	(Austria) Marcel Hirscher	(Germany) Felix Neureuther	
1558	3	29 November 2014	(Canada) Lake Louise	DH _{442}	(Norway) Kjetil Jansrud	(France) Guillermo Fayed (Canada) Manuel Osborne-Paradis		
1559	4	30 November 2014	(Canada) Lake Louise	SG _{178}	(Norway) Kjetil Jansrud	(Austria) Matthias Mayer	(Italy) Dominik Paris	
1560	5	5 December 2014	(United States) Beaver Creek	DH _{443}	(Norway) Kjetil Jansrud	(Switzerland) Beat Feuz	(United States) Steven Nyman	
1561	6	6 December 2014	(United States) Beaver Creek	SG _{179}	(Austria) Hannes Reichelt	(Norway) Kjetil Jansrud	(France) Alexis Pinturault	
1562	7	7 December 2014	(United States) Beaver Creek	GS _{373}	(United States) Ted Ligety	(France) Alexis Pinturault	(Austria) Marcel Hirscher	
		13 December 2014	(France) Val-d'Isère	GS _{cnx}	lack of snow; replaced in Åre on 12 December 2014			
		14 December 2014	(France) Val-d'Isère	SL _{cnx}	lack of snow; replaced in Åre on 14 December 2014			
1563	8	(Note: Giant slalom from Val-d'Isère was rescheduled to Åre on 12 December 2014)12 December 2014	(Sweden) Åre	GS _{374}	(Austria) Marcel Hirscher	(United States) Ted Ligety	(Germany) Stefan Luitz	
1564	9	(Note: Slalom from Val-d'Isère was rescheduled to Åre on 14 December 2014)14 December 2014	(Sweden) Åre	SL _{441}	(Austria) Marcel Hirscher	(Germany) Felix Neureuther	(Russia) Aleksandr Khoroshilov	
1565	10	19 December 2014	(Italy) Val Gardena	DH _{444}	(United States) Steven Nyman	(Norway) Kjetil Jansrud	(Italy) Dominik Paris	
1566	11	20 December 2014	(Italy) Val Gardena	SG _{180}	(Norway) Kjetil Jansrud	(Italy) Dominik Paris	(Austria) Hannes Reichelt	
1567	12	21 December 2014	(Italy) Alta Badia	GS _{375}	(Austria) Marcel Hirscher	(United States) Ted Ligety	(France) Thomas Fanara	
1568	13	22 December 2014	(Italy) Madonna di Campiglio	SL _{442}	(Germany) Felix Neureuther	(Germany) Fritz Dopfer	(Sweden) Jens Byggmark	
1569	14	28 December 2014	(Italy) Santa Caterina	DH _{445}	(United States) Travis Ganong	(Austria) Matthias Mayer	(Italy) Dominik Paris	
		1 January 2015	(Germany) Munich	CE _{cnx}	lack of snow			
1570	15	6 January 2015	(Croatia) Zagreb	SL _{443}	(Austria) Marcel Hirscher	(Germany) Felix Neureuther	(Norway) Sebastian Foss Solevåg	
1571	16	10 January 2015	(Switzerland) Adelboden	GS _{376}	(Austria) Marcel Hirscher	(France) Alexis Pinturault	(Norway) Henrik Kristoffersen	
1572	17	11 January 2015	(Switzerland) Adelboden	SL _{444}	(Italy) Stefano Gross	(Germany) Fritz Dopfer	(Austria) Marcel Hirscher	
1573	18	16 January 2015	(Switzerland) Wengen	AC _{121}	(Switzerland) Carlo Janka	(France) Victor Muffat-Jeandet	(Croatia) Ivica Kostelić	
1574	19	17 January 2015	(Switzerland) Wengen	SL _{445}	(Germany) Felix Neureuther	(Italy) Stefano Gross	(Norway) Henrik Kristoffersen	
1575	20	18 January 2015	(Switzerland) Wengen	DH _{446}	(Austria) Hannes Reichelt	(Switzerland) Beat Feuz	(Switzerland) Carlo Janka	
1576	21	23 January 2015	(Austria) Kitzbühel	SG _{181}	(Italy) Dominik Paris	(Austria) Matthias Mayer	(Austria) Georg Streitberger	
1577	22	23 January 2015	(Austria) Kitzbühel	AC _{122}	(France) Alexis Pinturault	(Austria) Marcel Hirscher	(Czech Republic) Ondřej Bank	
1578	23	24 January 2015	(Austria) Kitzbühel	DH _{447}	(Norway) Kjetil Jansrud	(Italy) Dominik Paris	(France) Guillermo Fayed	
1579	24	25 January 2015	(Austria) Kitzbühel	SL _{446}	(Sweden) Mattias Hargin	(Austria) Marcel Hirscher	(Germany) Felix Neureuther	
1580	25	27 January 2015	(Austria) Schladming	SL _{447}	(Russia) Alexander Khoroshilov	(Italy) Stefano Gross	(Germany) Felix Neureuther	
FIS Alpine World Ski Championships 2015 (2–15 February)
1581	26	21 February 2015	(Austria) Saalbach	DH _{448}	(Austria) Matthias Mayer	(Austria) Max Franz	(Austria) Hannes Reichelt	
1582	27	22 February 2015	(Austria) Saalbach	SG _{182}	(Austria) Matthias Mayer	(France) Adrien Théaux	(Norway) Kjetil Jansrud	
1583	28	28 February 2015	(Germany) Garmisch-Partenkirchen	DH _{449}	(Austria) Hannes Reichelt	(Austria) Romed Baumann	(Austria) Matthias Mayer	
1584	29	1 March 2015	(Germany) Garmisch-Partenkirchen	GS _{377}	(Austria) Marcel Hirscher	(Germany) Felix Neureuther	(Austria) Benjamin Raich	
1585	30	7 March 2015	(Norway) Kvitfjell	DH _{450}	(Austria) Hannes Reichelt	(Canada) M. Osborne-Paradis	(Italy) Werner Heel	
1586	31	8 March 2015	(Norway) Kvitfjell	SG _{183}	(Norway) Kjetil Jansrud	(Austria) Vincent Kriechmayr	(Canada) Dustin Cook	
1587	32	14 March 2015	(Slovenia) Kranjska Gora	GS _{378}	(France) Alexis Pinturault	(Austria) Marcel Hirscher	(France) Thomas Fanara	
1588	33	15 March 2015	(Slovenia) Kranjska Gora	SL _{448}	(Norway) Henrik Kristoffersen	(Italy) Giuliano Razzoli	(Sweden) Mattias Hargin	
1589	34	18 March 2015	(France) Méribel	DH _{451}	(Norway) Kjetil Jansrud	(Switzerland) Didier Défago	(Austria) Georg Streitberger	
1590	35	19 March 2015	(France) Méribel	SG _{184}	(Canada) Dustin Cook	(Norway) Kjetil Jansrud	(France) Brice Roger	
1591	36	21 March 2015	(France) Méribel	GS _{379}	(Norway) Henrik Kristoffersen	(Germany) Fritz Dopfer	(France) Thomas Fanara	
1592	37	22 March 2015	(France) Méribel	SL _{449}	(Austria) Marcel Hirscher	(Italy) Giuliano Razzoli	(Russia) Alexander Khoroshilov	

=== Women ===
Event key: DH – Downhill, SL – Slalom, GS – Giant slalom, SG – Super giant slalom, AC – Alpine Combined, CE –City Event (Parallel)
Race	Season	Date	Place	Type	Winner	Second	Third	Details
1455	1	25 October 2014	(Austria) Sölden	GS _{372}	(Austria) Anna Fenninger (United States) Mikaela Shiffrin		(Austria) Eva-Maria Brem	
1456	2	15 November 2014	(Finland) Levi	SL _{418}	(Slovenia) Tina Maze	(Sweden) Frida Hansdotter	(Austria) Kathrin Zettel	
1457	3	29 November 2014	(United States) Aspen	GS _{373}	(Austria) Eva-Maria Brem	(Austria) Kathrin Zettel	(Italy) Federica Brignone	
1458	4	30 November 2014	(United States) Aspen	SL _{419}	(Austria) Nicole Hosp	(Sweden) Frida Hansdotter	(Austria) Kathrin Zettel	
1459	5	5 December 2014	(Canada) Lake Louise	DH _{369}	(Slovenia) Tina Maze	(Austria) Anna Fenninger	(Liechtenstein) Tina Weirather	
1460	6	6 December 2014	(Canada) Lake Louise	DH _{370}	(United States) Lindsey Vonn	(United States) Stacey Cook	(United States) Julia Mancuso	
1461	7	7 December 2014	(Canada) Lake Louise	SG _{197}	(Switzerland) Lara Gut	(United States) Lindsey Vonn	(Slovenia) Tina Maze	
		13 December 2014	(France) Courchevel	GS _{cnx}	lack of snow; replaced in Åre on 12 December 2014			
		14 December 2014	(France) Courchevel	SL _{cnx}	lack of snow; replaced in Åre on 13 December 2014			
1462	8	(Note: Giant slalom from Courchevel was rescheduled to Åre on 12 December 2014)12 December 2014	(Sweden) Åre	GS _{374}	(Slovenia) Tina Maze	(Sweden) Sara Hector	(Austria) Eva-Maria Brem	
1463	9	(Note: Slalom from Courchevel was rescheduled to Åre on 13 December 2014)13 December 2014	(Sweden) Åre	SL _{420}	(Sweden) Maria Pietilä-Holmner	(Slovenia) Tina Maze	(Sweden) Frida Hansdotter	
1464	10	20 December 2014	(France) Val-d'Isère	DH _{371}	(United States) Lindsey Vonn	(Austria) Elisabeth Görgl (Germany) Viktoria Rebensburg		
1465	11	21 December 2014	(France) Val-d'Isère	SG _{198}	(Austria) Elisabeth Görgl	(Austria) Anna Fenninger	(Slovenia) Tina Maze	
		28 December 2014	(Austria) Semmering	GS _{cnx}	lack of snow; replaced in Kühtai on 28 December 2014			
		29 December 2014	(Austria) Semmering	SL _{cnx}	lack of snow; replaced in Kühtai on 29 December 2014			
1466	12	(Note: Giant slalom from Semmering was rescheduled to Kühtai on 28 December 2014)28 December 2014	(Austria) Kühtai	GS _{375}	(Sweden) Sara Hector	(Austria) Anna Fenninger	(United States) Mikaela Shiffrin	
1467	13	(Note: Slalom from Semmering was rescheduled to Kühtai on 29 December 2014)29 December 2014	(Austria) Kühtai	SL _{421}	(United States) Mikaela Shiffrin	(Czech Republic) Šárka Strachová	(Switzerland) Wendy Holdener	
		1 January 2015	(Germany) Munich	CE _{cnx}	lack of snow			
1468	14	4 January 2015	(Croatia) Zagreb	SL _{422}	(United States) Mikaela Shiffrin	(Austria) Kathrin Zettel	(Norway) Nina Løseth	
		10 January 2015	(Austria) Bad Kleinkirchheim	DH _{cnx}	strong winds; replaced in Cortina d'Ampezzo on 16 January 2015			
		11 January 2015	(Austria) Bad Kleinkirchheim	SG _{cnx}	strong winds; replaced in Bansko on 27 February 2018			
1469	15	13 January 2015	(Austria) Flachau	SL _{423}	(Sweden) Frida Hansdotter	(Slovenia) Tina Maze	(United States) Mikaela Shiffrin	
1470	16	(Note: Downhill from Bad Kleinkirchheim was rescheduled to Cortina d'Ampezzo on 16 January 2015)16 January 2015	(Italy) Cortina d'Ampezzo	DH _{372}	(Italy) Elena Fanchini	(Canada) Larisa Yurkiw	(Germany) Viktoria Rebensburg	
		17 January 2015	(Italy) Cortina d'Ampezzo	DH _{cnx}	too much snow; replaced in Cortina d'Ampezzo on 18 January 2015			
		18 January 2015	(Italy) Cortina d'Ampezzo	SG _{cnx}	original schedule; switch delay with downhill in Cortina d'Ampezzo on 19 January 2015			
1471	17	(Note: Downhill from Cortina d'Ampezzo was rescheduled from 17 to 18 January 2015)18 January 2015	(Italy) Cortina d'Ampezzo	DH _{373}	(United States) Lindsey Vonn	(Austria) Elisabeth Görgl	(Italy) Daniela Merighetti	
1472	18	(Note: Super giant slalom from Cortina d'Ampezzo was rescheduled from 18 to 19 January 2015)19 January 2015	(Italy) Cortina d'Ampezzo	SG _{199}	(United States) Lindsey Vonn	(Austria) Anna Fenninger	(Liechtenstein) Tina Weirather	
1473	19	24 January 2015	(Switzerland) St. Moritz	DH _{374}	(Switzerland) Lara Gut	(Austria) Anna Fenninger	(Hungary) Edit Miklós	
1474	20	25 January 2015	(Switzerland) St. Moritz	SG _{200}	(United States) Lindsey Vonn	(Austria) Anna Fenninger	(Austria) Nicole Hosp	
FIS Alpine World Ski Championships 2015 (2–15 February)
1475	21	21 February 2015	(Slovenia) Maribor	GS _{376}	(Austria) Anna Fenninger	(Germany) Viktoria Rebensburg	(Liechtenstein) Tina Weirather	
1476	22	22 February 2015	(Slovenia) Maribor	SL _{424}	(United States) Mikaela Shiffrin	(Slovakia) Veronika Velez-Zuzulová	(Czech Republic) Šárka Strachová	
		27 February 2015	(Bulgaria) Bansko	SG _{cnx}	fog; replaced in Bansko on 2 March 2015			
		28 February 2015	(Bulgaria) Bansko	SG _{cnx}	fog			
1477	23	1 March 2015	(Bulgaria) Bansko	AC _{095}	(Austria) Anna Fenninger	(Slovenia) Tina Maze	(Austria) Kathrin Zettel	
1478	24	(Note: Super giant slalom from Bad Kleinkirchheim was rescheduled to Bansko from 27 February to 2 March 2015)2 March 2015	(Bulgaria) Bansko	SG _{201}	(Austria) Anna Fenninger	(Slovenia) Tina Maze	(United States) Lindsey Vonn	
1479	25	7 March 2015	(Germany) Garmisch-Partenkirchen	DH _{375}	(Liechtenstein) Tina Weirather	(Austria) Anna Fenninger	(Slovenia) Tina Maze	
1480	26	8 March 2015	(Germany) Garmisch-Partenkirchen	SG _{202}	(United States) Lindsey Vonn	(Slovenia) Tina Maze	(Austria) Anna Fenninger	
1481	27	13 March 2015	(Sweden) Åre	GS _{377}	(Austria) Anna Fenninger	(Italy) Nadia Fanchini	(Austria) Eva-Maria Brem	
1482	28	14 March 2015	(Sweden) Åre	SL _{425}	(United States) Mikaela Shiffrin	(Slovakia) Veronika Velez-Zuzulová	(Czech Republic) Šárka Strachová	
1483	29	18 March 2015	(France) Méribel	DH _{376}	(United States) Lindsey Vonn	(Austria) Elisabeth Görgl	(Austria) Nicole Hosp	
1484	30	19 March 2015	(France) Méribel	SG _{203}	(United States) Lindsey Vonn	(Austria) Anna Fenninger	(Slovenia) Tina Maze	
1485	31	21 March 2015	(France) Méribel	SL _{426}	(United States) Mikaela Shiffrin	(Sweden) Frida Hansdotter	(Slovakia) Veronika Velez-Zuzulová	
1486	32	22 March 2015	(France) Méribel	GS _{378}	(Austria) Anna Fenninger	(Austria) Eva-Maria Brem	(Slovenia) Tina Maze	

=== Nation team event ===
Event key: PG – Parallel giant slalom
Race	Season	Date	Place	Type	Winner	Second	Third	Details
10	1	20 March 2015	(France) Méribel	PG _{007}	Switzerland Charlotte Chable; Michelle Gisin; Wendy Holdener; Gino Caviezel; Justin Murisier; Reto Schmidiger	Sweden Sara Hector; Anna Swenn-Larsson; Emelie Wikström; Mattias Hargin; Anton Lahdenperä; André Myhrer	Austria Eva-Maria Brem; Carmen Thalmann; Christoph Nösig; Philipp Schörghofer	

== Men's standings ==
Overall

Pos.	Athlete	SÖL (Austria)	LEV (Finland)	LKL (Canada)		BCR (United States)			ÅRE (Sweden)		VGA (Italy)		ABD (Italy)	MCP (Italy)	SCV (Italy)	ZAG (Croatia)	ADE (Switzerland)		WEN (Switzerland)			KIT (Austria)				SCH (Austria)	SAA (Austria)		GAR (Germany)		KVI (Norway)		KRG (Slovenia)		MÉR (France)				Pts
Pos.	Athlete	GS	SL	DH	SG	DH	SG	GS	GS	SL	DH	SG	GS	SL	DH	SL	GS	SL	SC	SL	DH	SG	SC	DH	SL	SL	DH	SG	DH	GS	DH	SG	GS	SL	DH	SG	GS	SL	Pts
1	(Austria) Hirscher	**1**	**2**				DNF	3	**1**	1			**1**	7		**1**	**1**	3		DNF1		44	2		**2**	14		17		**1**			2	6		4	4	1	1448
2	(Norway) Jansrud	15		1	1	1	2	15	DNF1		2	1	14		17		DNF2		DNF2		5	7	9	1			14	3	19	15	7	1	23		1	2	11		1288
3	(France) Pinturault	3	67		38		3	2	6	DSQ2		17	4	5		DSQ2	2	DNF2	10	4		25	1		9	17		5		5		14	**1**	7		10	8	4	1006
4	(Germany) Neureuther		3					8	DNF1	**2**			5	**1**		2	5	DNF1		1					3	3				2			5	9			DNF1	12	838
5	(Germany) Dopfer	2	6					10	4	7			8	2		8	4	**2**		7					5	4				11			27	10			2	10	797
6	(Austria) Reichelt	DNF1		9	6	8	1	25	DNF1		11	3	34		6				DNS2		1	24	DNS2	34			3	DNF	1		1	DNF			10	7			760
7	(Italy) Paris			4	3	4	5				3	2			3				25		19	1	**DNS2**	2			DNF	14	5		9	4			22	17			745
8	(Norway) Kristoffersen	56	1					27	9	DNF1			18	4		DNF2	3	5		3					7	7				13			6	1			**1**	7	729
9	(Austria) Mayer			15	2	9	17	24	41		7	DNF	DNF2		2		32		4		22	2	DNS2	10			1	1	3		19	DNF	DNF2		14	DNF			717
10	(Switzerland) Janka	11		23	24	26	9	7	16		21	6	20		14		21		**1**		3	21	6	22			4	4	23	6	37	8	16		16	DNF	15		643
Pos.	Athlete	GS	SL	DH	SG	DH	SG	GS	GS	SL	DH	SG	GS	SL	DH	SL	GS	SL	SC	SL	DH	SG	SC	DH	SL	SL	DH	SG	DH	GS	DH	SG	GS	SL	DH	SG	GS	SL	Pts
Pos.	Athlete	SÖL (Austria)	LEV (Finland)	LKL (Canada)		BCR (United States)			ÅRE (Sweden)		VGA (Italy)		ABD (Italy)	MCP (Italy)	SCV (Italy)	ZAG (Croatia)	ADE (Switzerland)		WEN (Switzerland)			KIT (Austria)				SCH (Austria)	SAA (Austria)		GAR (Germany)		KVI (Norway)		KRG (Slovenia)		MÉR (France)				Pts

Colour	Result
Gold	Winner
Silver	2nd place
Bronze	3rd place
Green	Points finish
Blue	Non-points finish
Purple	Did not finish (DNF)
Black	Disqualified (DSQ)
White	Did not start (DNS)

**Bold** – Best time in 1st run
Italics – Best time in 2nd run

Downhill

Pos.	after all 10 races	Points
**1**	(Norway) **Kjetil Jansrud**	605
2	(Austria) Hannes Reichelt	511
3	(France) Guillermo Fayed	389
4	(Italy) Dominik Paris	386
	(Austria) Matthias Mayer	386

Super-G

Rank	after all 7 races	Points
**1**	(Norway) **Kjetil Jansrud**	556
2	(Italy) Dominik Paris	353
3	(Austria) Matthias Mayer	274
4	(Austria) Hannes Reichelt	243
5	(Canada) Dustin Cook	239

Giant slalom

Rank	after all 8 races	Points
**1**	(Austria) **Marcel Hirscher**	690
2	(France) Alexis Pinturault	487
3	(United States) Ted Ligety	462
4	(Germany) Fritz Dopfer	346
5	(France) Thomas Fanara	330

Slalom

Rank	after all 10 races	Points
**1**	(Austria) **Marcel Hirscher**	614
2	(Germany) Felix Neureuther	591
3	(Russia) Aleksandr Khoroshilov	485
4	(Norway) Henrik Kristoffersen	463
5	(Germany) Fritz Dopfer	451

Alpine combined

Rank	after all 2 races	Points
**1**	(Switzerland) **Carlo Janka** (no trophy) (Note: Crystal globes were not awarded in the Combined discipline in 2015.)	140
2	(France) Alexis Pinturault	126
3	(France) Victor Muffat-Jeandet	125
4	(Croatia) Ivica Kostelić	110
5	(Czech Republic) Ondřej Bank	92

== Women's standings ==
Overall

Pos.	Athlete	SÖL (Austria)	LEV (Finland)	ASP (United States)		LKL (Canada)			ÅRE (Sweden)		ISÈ (France)		KÜH (Austria)		ZAG (Croatia)	FLA (Austria)	COR (Italy)			STM (Switzerland)		MAR (Slovenia)		BAN (Bulgaria)		GAR (Germany)		ÅRE (Sweden)		MÉR (France)				Pts
Pos.	Athlete	GS	SL	GS	SL	DH	DH	SG	GS	SL	DH	SG	GS	SL	SL	SL	DH	DH	SG	DH	SG	GS	SL	SC	SG	DH	SG	GS	SL	DH	SG	SL	GS	Pts
1	(Austria) Fenninger	1		12		2	9	8	6		11	2	2				5	9	2	2	2	**1**		**1**	1	2	3	**1**		8	2	23	**1**	1553
2	(Slovenia) Maze	22	**1**	4	9	1	8	3	1	2	7	3	7	6	5	2	13	5	4	18	DSQ	DNF1	DNF2	2	2	3	2	20	16	4	3	4	3	1531
3	(United States) Vonn					8	1	2			1	DNF					10	1	1	23	1	DNF1		DNS2	3	7	1			1	1		5	1087
4	(United States) Shiffrin	**1**	11	6	**5**				10	4			**3**	**1**	**1**	3						5	**1**					4	**1**			1	7	1036
5	(Austria) Hosp		9		1	24	26	11		DNF1	14	11		7	DNF1	7	19	14	10	21	3		DNF1	DNF2	4	4	10		12	3	5	10		684
6	(Sweden) Hansdotter	16	2	DNF1	2				18	3			20	4	4	**1**						14	9					11	6			**2**	9	679
7	(Austria) Zettel	4	3	2	3				11	15			15	8	2	8						6	7	3				13	15			11		646
8	(Austria) Görgl	DNF1		8		DNF	16	12	DNF2		2	1	11				11	2	8	8	DSQ	18		14	11	10	7			2	DNF		16	638
9	(Switzerland) Gut	DNF2		22		11	15	1	21		4	4	18				25	8	6	1	DNF	19		DNF1	10	8	5	9		9	DNF		19	623
10	(Liechtenstein) Weirather	10		DNF2		3	12	7	16		12	DNF	13				21	DNF	3	9	DNF	3		DNS2	7	1	18	14		10	4		18	603
Pos.	Athlete	GS	SL	GS	SL	DH	DH	SG	GS	SL	DH	SG	GS	SL	SL	SL	DH	DH	SG	DH	SG	GS	SL	SC	SG	DH	SG	GS	SL	DH	SG	SL	GS	Pts
Pos.	Athlete	SÖL (Austria)	LEV (Finland)	ASP (United States)		LKL (Canada)			ÅRE (Sweden)		ISÈ (France)		KÜH (Austria)		ZAG (Croatia)	FLA (Austria)	COR (Italy)			STM (Switzerland)		MAR (Slovenia)		BAN (Bulgaria)		GAR (Germany)		ÅRE (Sweden)		MÉR (France)				Pts

Colour	Result
Gold	Winner
Silver	2nd place
Bronze	3rd place
Green	Points finish
Blue	Non-points finish
Purple	Did not finish (DNF)
Black	Disqualified (DSQ)
White	Did not start (DNS)

**Bold** – Best time in 1st run
Italics – Best time in 2nd run

Downhill

Rank	after all 8 races	Points
**1**	(United States) **Lindsey Vonn**	502'
2	(Austria) Anna Fenninger	399
3	(Slovenia) Tina Maze	356
4	(Austria) Elisabeth Görgl	337
5	(Italy) Elena Fanchini	291

Super-G

Rank	after all 7 races	Points
**1**	(United States) **Lindsey Vonn**	540
2	(Austria) Anna Fenninger	512
3	(Slovenia) Tina Maze	390
4	(Austria) Cornelia Hütter	286
5	(Switzerland) Lara Gut	261

Giant slalom

Rank	after all 7 races	Points
**1**	(Austria) **Anna Fenninger**	542
2	(Austria) Eva-Maria Brem	436
3	(United States) Mikaela Shiffrin	357
4	(Sweden) Sara Hector	329
5	(Slovenia) Tina Maze	266

Slalom

Rank	after all 9 races	Points
**1**	(United States) **Mikaela Shiffrin**	679
2	(Sweden) Frida Hansdotter	569
3	(Slovenia) Tina Maze	439
4	(Czech Republic) Šárka Strachová	376
5	(Austria) Kathrin Zettel	356

Alpine combined

Rank	after 1 race	Points
**1**	(Austria) **Anna Fenninger** (no trophy)	100
2	(Slovenia) Tina Maze	80
3	(Austria) Kathrin Zettel	60
4	(France) Margot Bailet	50
5	(Canada) Marie-Michèle Gagnon	45

== Nations Cup ==
Overall

Rank	after all 70 races	Points
1	Austria	11617
2	Italy	6145
3	Switzerland	5362
4	United States	5069
5	France	5007

Men

Rank	after all 37 races	Points
1	Austria	5768
2	France	3874
3	Italy	3412
4	Switzerland	3158
5	Norway	2592

Women

Rank	after all 32 races	Points
1	Austria	5849
2	United States	3159
3	Italy	2733
4	Sweden	2291
5	Switzerland	2204

== Prize money ==
Top-5 Men

Rank	after all 37 races	CHF
1	(Austria) Marcel Hirscher	482,790
2	(Norway) Kjetil Jansrud	394,507
3	(France) Alexis Pinturault	226,720
4	(Italy) Dominik Paris	210,552
5	(Germany) Felix Neureuther	210,462

Top-5 Women

Rank	after all 32 races	CHF
1	(Austria) Anna Fenninger	391,703
2	(Slovenia) Tina Maze	366,814
3	(United States) Lindsey Vonn	308,500
4	(United States) Mikaela Shiffrin	301,239
5	(Sweden) Frida Hansdotter	169,543
