= Fritz Dopfer =

Austrian-German alpine skier

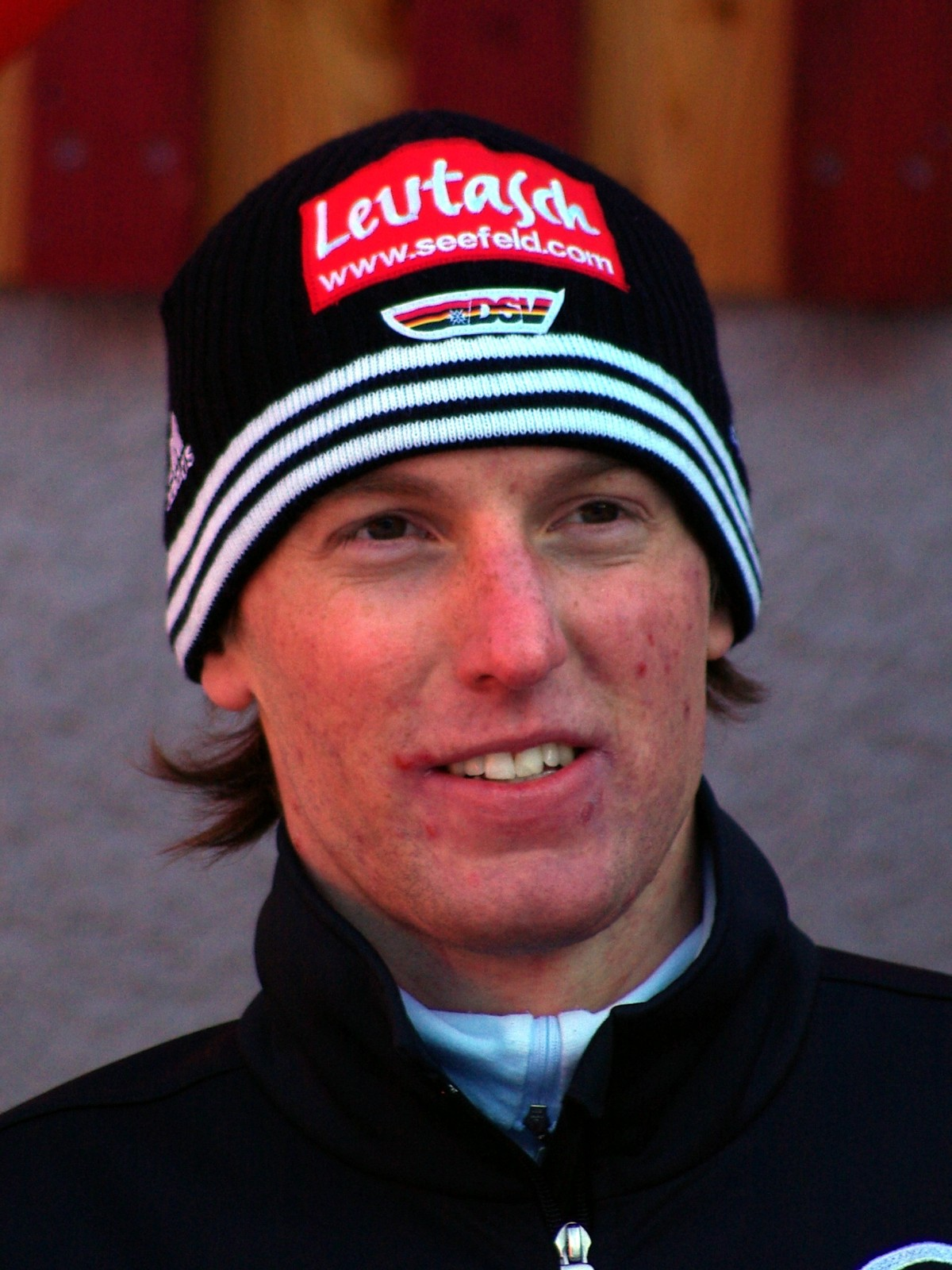
- Dopfer in January 2008

Personal information
- Born: 24 August 1987 (age 38) Innsbruck, Tyrol, Austria
- Height: 1.88 m (6 ft 2 in)

Skiing career
- Sport: Alpine skiing
- Club: SC Garmisch
- Retired: 8 February 2020 (age 32)
- Disciplines: Slalom, giant slalom
- World Cup debut: 28 October 2007 (age 20)

Olympics
- Teams: 2 – (2014, 2018)
- Medals: 0

World Championships
- Teams: 3 – (2011, 2013, 2015)
- Medals: 1 (0 gold)

World Cup
- Seasons: 9 – (2011–18)
- Wins: 0
- Podiums: 9 – (5 SL, 4 GS)
- Overall titles: 0 – (5th in 2015)
- Discipline titles: 0 – (4th in GS, 2015)
Medal record
Men's alpine skiing
Representing Germany
World Championships
Silver medal – second place	2015 Beaver Creek	Slalom
Bronze medal – third place	2013 Schladming	Team event

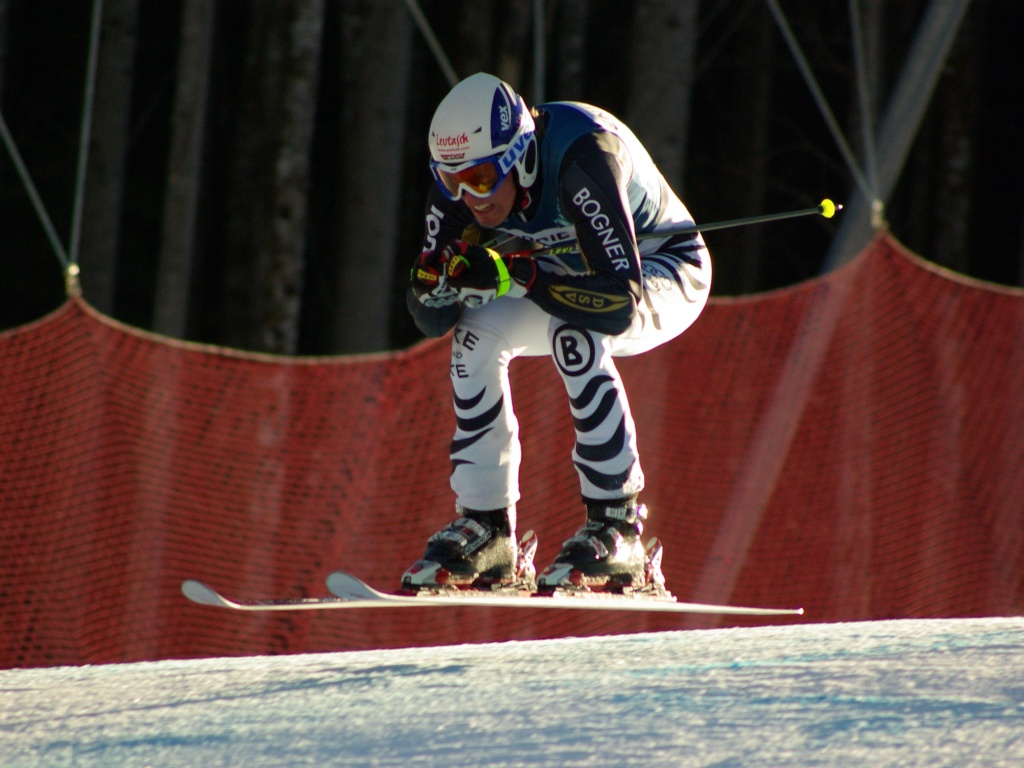
Dopfer in January 2008

Fritz Dopfer (German pronunciation: [ˈfʁɪts ˈdɔpfɐ]; born 24 August 1987) is a German former World Cup alpine ski racer, specializing in the technical events of giant slalom and slalom.

Born in Innsbruck, Austria, to a German father and an Austrian mother, the family lived in both countries during his youth. They lived in Schongau, Bavaria, in Germany until Dopfer was age 10, when the family moved to Tyrol in Austria.

Dopfer raced for Austria through April 2007, then joined the German team that summer and made his World Cup debut in October 2007. During his first three seasons on the German team, he raced primarily on the European Cup circuit, with several World Cup starts per season, but no results. He moved up to the World Cup team for the 2011 season, and attained his first World Cup podium (and first top ten) in December 2011 in a giant slalom at Beaver Creek, Colorado. It was the first World Cup GS podium for a German male in nearly 18 years, since January 1994.

== World Cup results ==
=== Season standings ===
Season	Age	Overall	Slalom	Giant slalom	Super-G	Downhill	Combined
2010	22	122	—	38	—	—	—
2011	23	70	30	30	—	—	—
2012	24	20	8	7	—	—	—
2013	25	11	7	9	—	—	—
2014	26	11	7	7	—	—	—
2015	27	5	5	4	—	—	—
2016	28	17	7	21	—	—	—
2017	29	102	37	54	—	—	—
2018	30	48	23	32	—	—	—
2019	31	113	56	39	—	—	—
2020	32	143	53	—	—	—	—

=== Race podiums ===
- 9 podiums – (5 SL, 4 GS)

Season	Date	Location	Discipline	Place
2012	4 Dec 2011	Beaver Creek, United States	Giant slalom	3rd
2012	15 Jan 2012	Wengen, Switzerland	Slalom	3rd
2013	12 Jan 2013	Adelboden, Switzerland	Giant slalom	2nd
2014	9 Mar 2014	Kranjska Gora, Slovenia	Slalom	2nd
2015	26 Oct 2014	Sölden, Austria	Giant slalom	2nd
2015	22 Dec 2014	Madonna di Campiglio, Italy	Slalom	2nd
2015	11 Jan 2015	Adelboden, Switzerland	Slalom	2nd
2015	21 Mar 2015	Méribel, France	Giant slalom	2nd
2016	24 Jan 2016	Kitzbühel, Austria	Slalom	3rd

== World Championship results ==
Year	Age	Slalom	Giant slalom	Super-G	Downhill	Combined
2011	23	21	15	—	—	—
2013	25	7	7	—	—	—
2015	27	2	15	—	—	—

== Olympic results ==
Year	Age	Slalom	Giant slalom	Super-G	Downhill	Combined	Team
2014	26	4	12	—	—	—	
2018	30	20	26	—	—	—	5

== Video ==
- You Tube.com – Dopfer takes 2nd in GS at Adelboden – 12 January 2013
