= Dustin Cook =

Canadian alpine skier (born 1989)

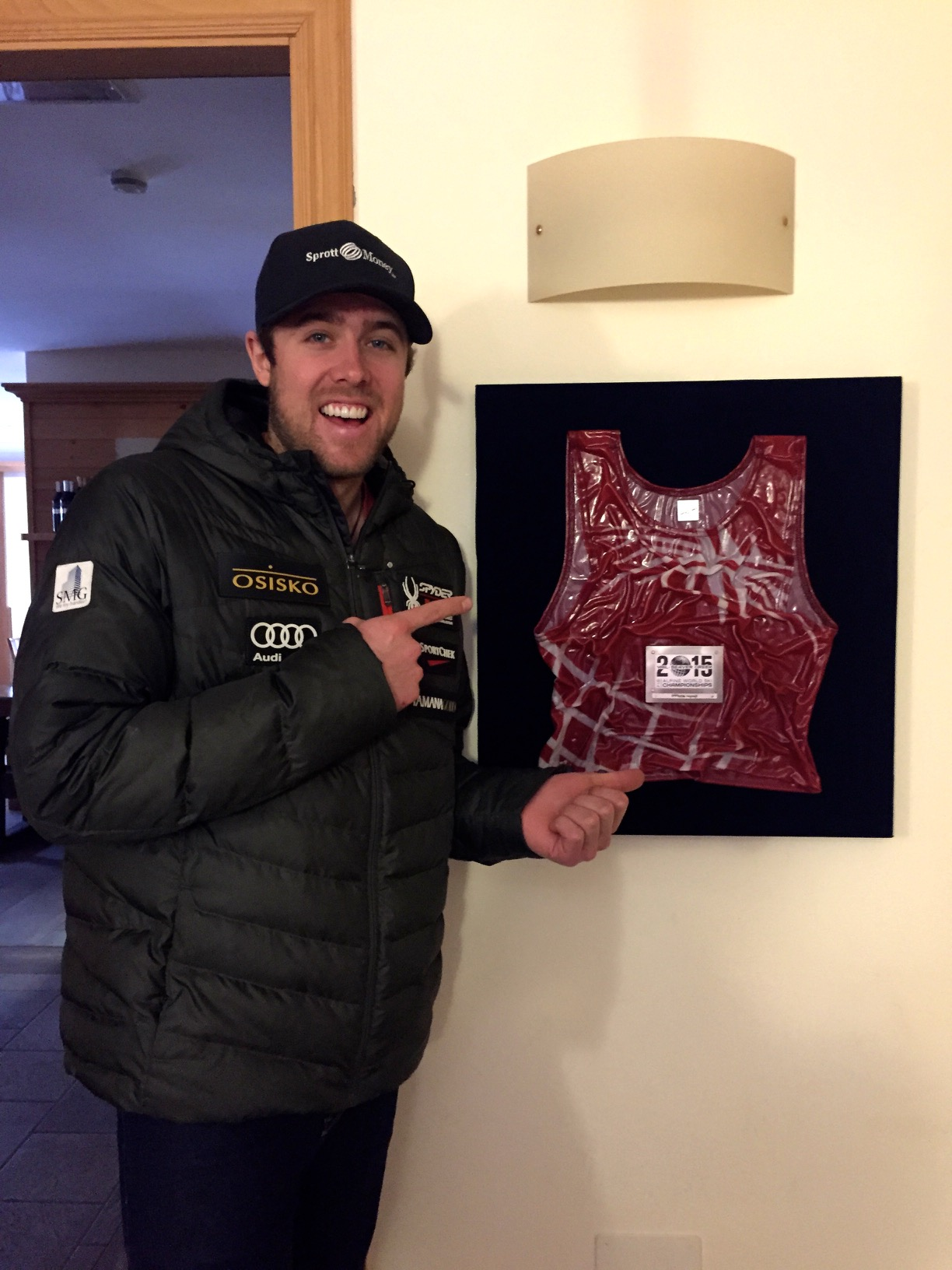

Personal information
- Born: February 11, 1989 (age 37) Toronto, Ontario, Canada
- Height: 1.83 m (6 ft 0 in)

Skiing career
- Sport: Alpine skiing
- Club: Mont Ste. Marie
- Retired: March 2020 (age 30)
- Disciplines: Super-G
- World Cup debut: November 27, 2010 (age 21)

Olympics
- Teams: 1 – (2018)
- Medals: 0

World Championships
- Teams: 4 – (2013–2019)
- Medals: 1 (0 gold)

World Cup
- Seasons: 8th – (2011–15, 2017–19)
- Wins: 1 – (1 SG)
- Podiums: 2 – (2 SG)
- Overall titles: 0 – (30th in 2015)
- Discipline titles: 0 – (5th in SG, 2015)
Medal record
Men's alpine skiing
Representing Canada
World Championships
Silver medal – second place	2015 Beaver Creek	Super-G

Dustin Cook (born February 11, 1989) is a Canadian former World Cup alpine ski racer. Born in Toronto, Ontario, he won a silver medal in the Super-G at the 2015 World Championships at Beaver Creek, USA.

Cook made his first World Cup podium in March 2015, in a Super-G at Kvitfjell, Norway, and won his first race eleven days later at the World Cup finals in Méribel, France.

== Career ==
Born in Toronto, Cook has lived in Lac-Sainte-Marie since he was ten. When he was five he competed in his first ski race, and when he was twelve he made the regional high performance ski team. Cook has 23 Nor-Am Cup podiums, ranking him tied for fifth among men for most podiums in Nor-Am Cup history as of the end of the 2014/15 season.

His first podium came in 2015 at the FIS Alpine World Ski Championships 2015 when he finished 2nd in the Super G at Beaver Creek. Cook became the first Canadian man to medal in a Super G at the World Championships. He also finished twelfth in Giant Slalom at the World Championships one week later. His first FIS Alpine World Cup podium came one month later when he finished 3rd in the Super G at Kvitfjell. He won his first race eleven days later at the World Cup Finals in Meribel. Cook finished the 2015 season with five top twenty World Cup finishes, in addition to his two podiums and World Championship medal. He finished the 2015 season ranked 5th in Super G, and 30th in Giant Slalom.

With his World Championship medal Cook became the eighth and final member of the Canadian Cowboys

== World Cup results ==
=== Season standings ===
Season	Age	Overall	Slalom	Giant slalom	Super-G	Downhill	Combined
2011	22	163	—	—	—	—	53
2012	23	—	—	—	—	—	—
2013	24	126	—	44	50	—	—
2014	25	—	—	—	—	—	—
2015	26	30	—	30	5	—	—
2016	27	injured, out for season					
2017	28	88	—	—	21	—	—
2018	29	70	—	—	17	—	—
2019	30	99	—	—	27	—	—

Standings through 20 January 2019

=== Race podiums ===
- 1 win – (1 SG)
- 2 podiums – (2 SG)

Season	Date	Location	Discipline	Place
2015	8 Mar 2015	Kvitfjell, Norway	Super-G	3rd
2015	18 Mar 2015	Méribel, France	Super-G	1st

== World Championships results ==
Year	Age	Slalom	Giant slalom	Super-G	Downhill	Combined
2013	24	—	DNF2	—	—	—
2015	26	—	12	2	—	—
2017	28	—	—	DNF	—	—
2019	30	—	—	DNF	—	—

== Olympic results ==
Year	Age	Slalom	Giant slalom	Super-G	Downhill	Combined
2018	29	—	—	9	32	—

== Other ==
Most Valuable Participant: Craigleith Men's Day 2016
