= Guillermo Fayed =

French alpine skier (born 1985)

Personal information
- Born: 28 November 1985 (age 40) Chamonix, France
- Height: 1.83 m (6 ft 0 in)
- Website: guillermofayed.com

Skiing career
- Sport: Alpine skiing
- Club: Armée-EMHM-C.S. Chamonix
- Disciplines: Downhill, Super-G
- World Cup debut: 10 December 2005 (age 20)

Olympics
- Teams: 2 – (2010, 2014)
- Medals: 0

World Championships
- Teams: 4 – (2011–17)
- Medals: 0

World Cup
- Seasons: 13 – (2006–18)
- Wins: 0
- Podiums: 4 – (4 DH)
- Overall titles: 0 – (17th in 2015)
- Discipline titles: 0 – (3rd in DH, 2015)

Guillermo Fayed (born 28 November 1985) is a French World Cup alpine ski racer and soldier who represented France in the 2010 and 2014 Olympic Games. He took 26th with a time of 1:56:20 in the men's downhill in 2010.

== World Cup results ==
=== Season standings ===
Season	Age	Overall	Slalom	Giant Slalom	Super G	Downhill	Combined
2006	20	144	—	—	—	—	51
2007	21	—	—	—	—	—	—
2008	22	107	—	—	—	40	48
2009	23	125	—	—	—	42	—
2010	24	96	—	—	—	40	38
2011	25	74	—	—	—	24	51
2012	26	76	—	—	—	28	—
2013	27	66	—	—	39	28	—
2014	28	64	—	—	—	25	—
2015	29	17	—	—	35	3	—
2016	30	29	—	—	42	8	—
2017	31	70	—	—	—	23	—
2018	32	115	—	—	—	37	—

=== Race podiums ===
- 0 wins
- 4 podiums – (4 DH); 19 top tens (19 DH)

Season	Date	Location	Discipline	Place
2015	29 Nov 2014	Lake Louise, Canada	Downhill	2nd
2015	24 Jan 2015	Kitzbühel, Austria	Downhill	3rd
2016	4 Dec 2015	(United States) Beaver Creek, USA	Downhill	3rd
2016	19 Dec 2015	Val Gardena, Italy	Downhill	2nd

== World Championship results ==
Year	Age	Slalom	Giant slalom	Super-G	Downhill	Combined
2011	25	—	—	—	23	—
2013	27	—	—	—	21	—
2015	29	—	—	—	5	—
2017	31	—	—	—	14	—

== Olympic results ==
Year	Age	Slalom	Giant slalom	Super-G	Downhill	Combined
2010	24	—	—	22	26	—
2014	28	—	—	—	26	—
