= Margot Bailet =

French alpine skier (born 1990)

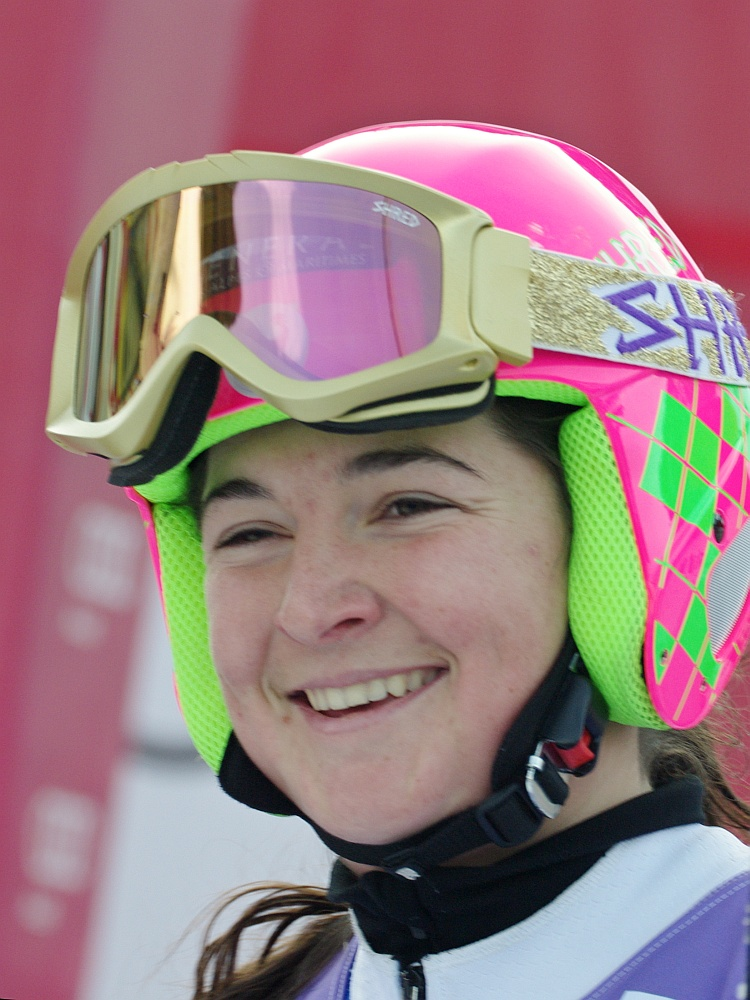
- Margot Bailet

Personal information
- Born: 25 July 1990 (age 36)

Skiing career
- Sport: Alpine skiing

Margot Bailet (French: [maʁɡo bɛlɛ]; born 25 July 1990) is a French alpine ski racer.

She competed at the 2015 World Championships in Beaver Creek, USA, in the Super-G.
