= FIS Alpine World Ski Championships 2015 – Men's downhill =

Men's downhill at the FIS Alpine World Ski Championships 2015
- Venue: Birds of Prey; Beaver Creek, Colorado, U.S.
- Date: February 7, 2015
- Competitors: 46 from 21 nations
- Winning time: 1:43.18

Medalists
gold medal	Patrick Küng	Switzerland
silver medal	Travis Ganong	United States
bronze medal	Beat Feuz	Switzerland

Men's Downhill
- Location: Birds of Prey; Beaver Creek, Colorado
- Vertical: 753 m (2,470 ft)
- Top elevation: 3,483 m (11,427 ft)
- Base elevation: 2,730 m (8,957 ft)
- Longest run: 2.740 km (1.70 mi)

The Men's downhill competition at the 2015 World Championships was held on Saturday, February 7.

Switzerland's Patrick Küng won the gold medal, Travis Ganong of the United States took the silver, and the bronze medalist was Beat Feuz of Switzerland.

The race course was 2.740 km (1.70 mi) in length, with a vertical drop of 753 m (2,470 ft) from a starting elevation of 3,483 m (11,427 ft) above sea level. Küng's winning time of 103.18 seconds yielded an average speed of 95.600 km/h (59.4 mph) and an average vertical descent rate of 7.298 m/s (23.9 ft/s).

== Results ==
The race was started at 11:00 MST (UTC-7).

Rank	Bib	Name	Country	Time	Diff.
1st place, gold medalist(s)	19	Patrick Küng	Switzerland	1:43.18	—
2nd place, silver medalist(s)	22	Travis Ganong	United States	1:43.42	+0.24
3rd place, bronze medalist(s)	15	Beat Feuz	Switzerland	1:43.49	+0.31
4	10	Steven Nyman	United States	1:43.52	+0.34
5	17	Guillermo Fayed	France	1:43.57	+0.39
6	11	Aksel Lund Svindal	Norway	1:43.63	+0.45
7	29	Ondřej Bank	Czech Republic	1:43.74	+0.56
8	6	Adrien Théaux	France	1:43.81	+0.63
9	35	Andrew Weibrecht	United States	1:43.85	+0.67
9	3	Carlo Janka	Switzerland	1:43.85	+0.67
11	23	Didier Défago	Switzerland	1:43.89	+0.71
12	20	Matthias Mayer	Austria	1:44.10	+0.92
13	21	Hannes Reichelt	Austria	1:44.12	+0.94
14	4	David Poisson	France	1:44.14	+0.96
15	18	Kjetil Jansrud	Norway	1:44.17	+0.99
16	9	Johan Clarey	France	1:44.26	+1.08
17	25	Andreas Sander	Germany	1:44.31	+1.13
18	5	Benjamin Thomsen	Canada	1:44.36	+1.18
19	12	Max Franz	Austria	1:44.49	+1.31
20	1	Jared Goldberg	United States	1:44.60	+1.42
21	24	Manuel Osborne-Paradis	Canada	1:44.84	+1.66
22	2	Josef Ferstl	Germany	1:44.86	+1.68
23	16	Dominik Paris	Italy	1:45.12	+1.94
24	14	Christof Innerhofer	Italy	1:45.30	+2.12
25	31	Martin Cater	Slovenia	1:45.32	+2.14
26	37	Aleksander Aamodt Kilde	Norway	1:45.39	+2.21
27	7	Klaus Brandner	Germany	1:45.62	+2.44
28	27	Matteo Marsaglia	Italy	1:45.66	+2.48
29	13	Georg Streitberger	Austria	1:45.68	+2.50
30	33	Natko Zrnčić-Dim	Croatia	1:45.70	+2.52
31	26	Andreas Romar	Finland	1:45.82	+2.64
32	8	Werner Heel	Italy	1:45.88	+2.70
33	30	Boštjan Kline	Slovenia	1:45.91	+2.73
34	34	Aleksandr Glebov	Russia	1:46.16	+2.98
35	40	Max Ullrich	Croatia	1:46.23	+3.05
36	32	Morgan Pridy	Canada	1:46.32	+3.14
37	41	Henrik von Appen	Chile	1:46.78	+3.60
38	39	Christoffer Faarup	Denmark	1:47.37	+4.19
39	45	Arnaud Alessandria	Monaco	1:47.75	+4.57
40	43	Willis Feasey	New Zealand	1:48.31	+5.13
41	48	Andreas Žampa	Slovakia	1:48.57	+5.39
42	38	Igor Zakurdayev	Kazakhstan	1:49.22	+6.04
43	46	Cristian Javier Simari Birkner	Argentina	1:51.96	+8.78
44	47	Ioan Valeriu Achiriloaie	Romania	1:52.92	+9.74
	28	Klemen Kosi	Slovenia	DNF	
	44	Istok Rodeš	Croatia	DNF	
	36	Marvin van Heek	Netherlands	DNS	
	42	Nick Prebble	New Zealand	DNS	
