= Hannes Reichelt =

Austrian alpine skier

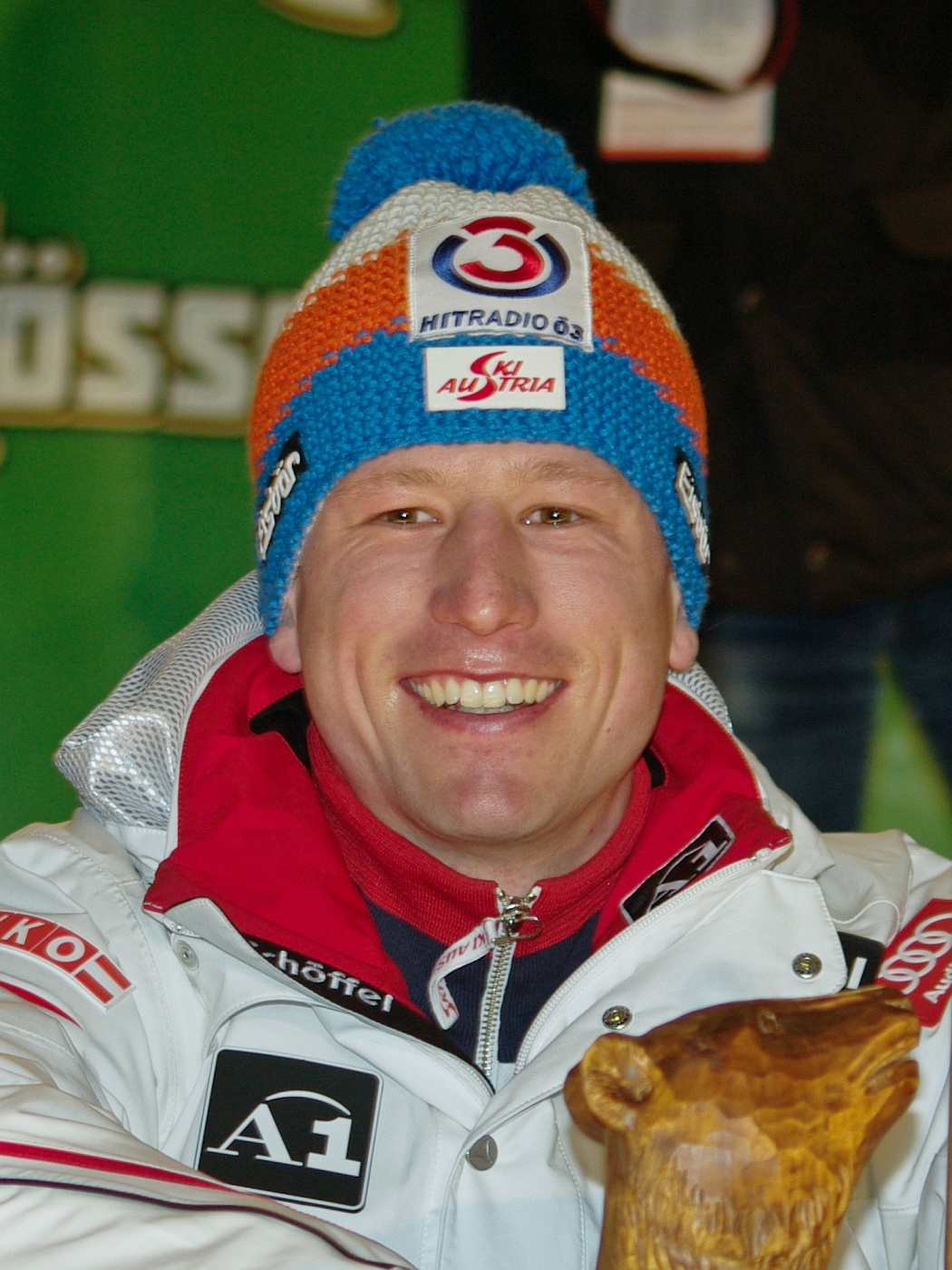
- Reichelt in February 2011

Personal information
- Born: 5 July 1980 (age 46) Altenmarkt im Pongau, Salzburg, Austria
- Height: 1.83 m (6 ft 0 in)
- Website: hannes-reichelt.com

Skiing career
- Sport: Alpine skiing
- Club: Skiklub Sparkasse Radstadt
- Retired: 6 March 2021 (age 40)
- Disciplines: Downhill, Super-G, giant slalom, combined
- World Cup debut: 7 December 2001 (age 21)

Olympics
- Teams: 2 – (2006, 2018)
- Medals: 0

World Championships
- Teams: 8 – (2003, 2007–19)
- Medals: 2 (1 gold)

World Cup
- Seasons: 19 – (2003–2021)
- Wins: 13 – (6 DH, 6 SG, 1 GS)
- Podiums: 44 – (19 DH, 20 SG, 5 GS)
- Overall titles: 0 – (5th in 2012)
- Discipline titles: 1 – (SG, 2008)
Medal record
Men's alpine skiing
Representing Austria
World Cup race podiums
| Event | 1st | 2nd | 3rd |
|---|---|---|---|
| Giant slalom | 1 | 2 | 3 |
| Downhill | 6 | 6 | 7 |
| Super-G | 6 | 5 | 8 |
| Total | 13 | 13 | 18 |
World Championships
| Gold medal – first place | 2015 Beaver Creek | Super-G |
| Silver medal – second place | 2011 Garmisch | Super-G |
Junior World Championships
| Bronze medal – third place | 2000 Quebec | Super-G |

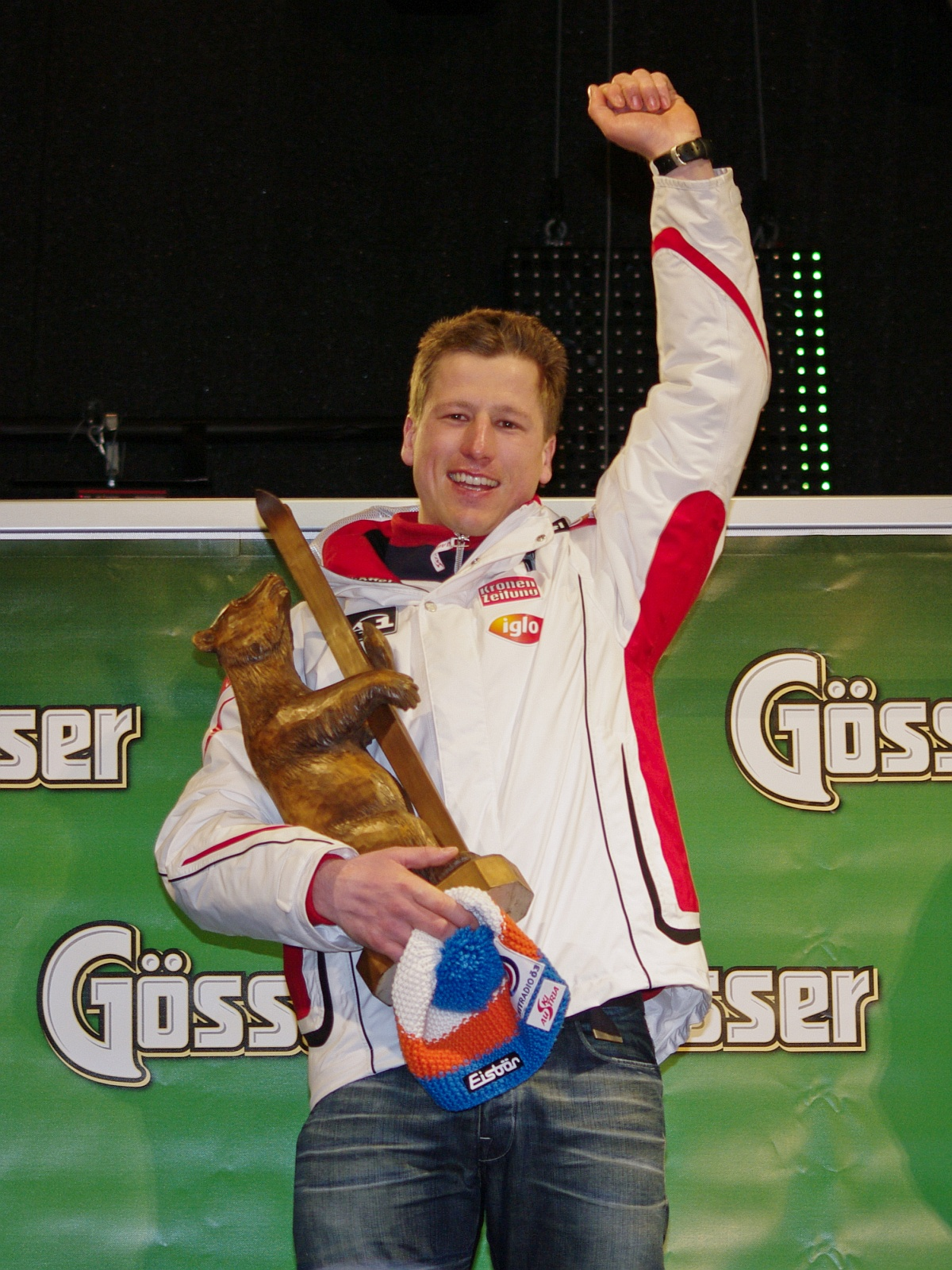
Victory at Hinterstoder Super G in February 2011

Johannes "Hannes" Reichelt (born 5 July 1980) is a retired Austrian World Cup alpine ski racer. He competed mainly in downhill and super-G, as well as in giant slalom.

== Biography ==
Born in Altenmarkt im Pongau in Salzburg, Reichelt made his World Cup debut in December 2001. He made his first podium in December 2002 and won his first World Cup race, a super-G, in December 2005. Reichelt also won the Europa Cup overall title in 2005, as well as the Europa Cup season title in giant slalom in 2003.

Reichelt won the World Cup season title in the super-G in 2008, a single point ahead of runner-up Didier Cuche. Reichelt won the final Super-G event of the season by one-hundredth of a second to claim the globe. At the 2015 World Championships, he won the gold medal in the super-G, to go along with his silver medal in the super-G at the 2011 World Championships.

Although without a victory in the 2012 season, Reichelt attained seven World Cup podiums in three disciplines, and had his best career finishes in the season standings for the overall, downhill (4th), and giant slalom (5th).

Through December 2020, Reichelt has thirteen World Cup victories and 44 podiums. He announced his retirement after not being qualified for finals in both speed disciplines at the 2021 season.

== World Cup results ==
=== Season titles ===
Season
| Season | Discipline |
| 2008 | Super-G |

=== Season standings ===
Season
| Season | Age | Overall | Slalom | Giant slalom | Super G | Downhill | Combined |
| 2003 | 22 | 42 | — | — | 5 | — | — |
| 2004 | 23 | 138 | — | 52 | — | — | — |
| 2005 | 24 | 95 | — | — | 31 | — | — |
| 2006 | 25 | 20 | — | 16 | 4 | 34 | — |
| 2007 | 26 | 48 | — | 13 | 24 | — | — |
| 2008 | 27 | 10 | — | 8 | 1 | 51 | — |
| 2009 | 28 | 41 | — | 17 | 18 | — | — |
| 2010 | 29 | 27 | — | 21 | 7 | — | — |
| 2011 | 30 | 23 | — | 12 | 5 | 36 | 56 |
| 2012 | 31 | 5 | — | 5 | 8 | 4 | 20 |
| 2013 | 32 | 8 | — | 17 | 6 | 5 | 17 |
| 2014 | 33 | 12 | — | 37 | 18 | 2 | — |
| 2015 | 34 | 6 | — | 47 | 4 | 2 | — |
| 2016 | 35 | 16 | — | 48 | 13 | 10 | — |
| 2017 | 36 | 10 | — | — | 2 | 6 | — |
| 2018 | 37 | 10 | — | — | 4 | 8 | — |
| 2019 | 38 | 27 | — | — | 14 | 15 | — |
| 2020 | 39 | 51 | — | — | 17 | 28 | — |
| 2021 | 40 | 89 | — | — | 35 | 43 | — |

=== Race podiums ===
- 13 wins - (6 DH, 6 SG, 1 GS)
- 44 podiums - (19 DH, 20 SG, 5 GS)

Season
| Season | Date | Location | Discipline | Place |
| 2003 | 20 Dec 2002 | Val Gardena, Italy | Super-G | 2nd |
| 2003 | 13 Mar 2003 | Kvitfjell, Norway | Super-G | 3rd |
| 2006 | 1 Dec 2005 | (United States) Beaver Creek, USA | Super-G | 1st |
| 2006 | 20 Jan 2006 | Kitzbühel, Austria | Super-G | 3rd |
| 2008 | 3 Dec 2007 | (United States) Beaver Creek, USA | Super-G | 1st |
| 2008 | 5 Jan 2008 | Adelboden, Switzerland | Giant slalom | 3rd |
| 2008 | 21 Feb 2008 | Whistler, Canada | Super-G | 2nd |
| 2008 | 23 Feb 2008 | Whistler, Canada | Giant slalom | 1st |
| 2008 | 13 Mar 2008 | Bormio, Italy | Super-G | 1st |
| 2009 | 21 Dec 2008 | Alta Badia, Italy | Giant slalom | 3rd |
| 2010 | 7 Mar 2010 | Kvitfjell, Norway | Super-G | 2nd |
| 2011 | 5 Feb 2011 | Hinterstoder, Austria | Super-G | 1st |
| 2012 | 26 Nov 2011 | Lake Louise, Canada | Downhill | 3rd |
| 2012 | 18 Dec 2011 | Alta Badia, Italy | Giant slalom | 2nd |
| 2012 | 14 Jan 2012 | Wengen, Switzerland | Downhill | 2nd |
| 2012 | 28 Jan 2012 | Garmisch, Germany | Downhill | 3rd |
| 2012 | 26 Feb 2012 | Crans-Montana, Switzerland | Super-G | 3rd |
| 2012 | 14 Mar 2012 | Schladming, Austria | Downhill | 3rd |
| 2012 | 17 Mar 2012 | Schladming, Austria | Giant slalom | 2nd |
| 2013 | 1 Dec 2012 | (United States) Beaver Creek, USA | Super-G | 3rd |
| 2013 | 29 Dec 2012 | Bormio, Italy | Downhill | 1st |
| 2013 | 19 Jan 2013 | Wengen, Switzerland | Downhill | 3rd |
| 2013 | 26 Jan 2013 | Kitzbühel, Austria | Downhill | 3rd |
| 2014 | 6 Dec 2013 | (United States) Beaver Creek, USA | Downhill | 2nd |
| 2014 | 7 Dec 2013 | (United States) Beaver Creek, USA | Super-G | 3rd |
| 2014 | 29 Dec 2013 | Bormio, Italy | Downhill | 2nd |
| 2014 | 18 Jan 2014 | Wengen, Switzerland | Downhill | 2nd |
| 2014 | 25 Jan 2014 | Kitzbühel, Austria | Downhill | 1st |
| 2015 | 6 Dec 2014 | (United States) Beaver Creek, USA | Super-G | 1st |
| 2015 | 20 Dec 2014 | Val Gardena, Italy | Super-G | 3rd |
| 2015 | 18 Jan 2015 | Wengen, Switzerland | Downhill | 1st |
| 2015 | 21 Feb 2015 | Saalbach, Austria | Downhill | 3rd |
| 2015 | 28 Feb 2015 | Garmisch, Germany | Downhill | 1st |
| 2015 | 7 Mar 2015 | Kvitfjell, Norway | Downhill | 1st |
| 2016 | 29 Dec 2015 | Santa Caterina, Italy | Downhill | 2nd |
| 2016 | 16 Jan 2016 | Wengen, Switzerland | Downhill | 2nd |
| 2016 | 22 Jan 2016 | Kitzbühel, Austria | Super-G | 3rd |
| 2017 | 27 Dec 2016 | Santa Caterina, Italy | Super-G | 2nd |
| 2017 | 28 Jan 2017 | Garmisch, Germany | Downhill | 1st |
| 2017 | 26 Feb 2017 | Kvitfjell, Norway | Super-G | 2nd |
| 2017 | 16 Mar 2017 | (United States) Aspen, USA | Super-G | 1st |
| 2018 | 26 Nov 2017 | Lake Louise, Canada | Super-G | 3rd |
| 2018 | 1 Dec 2017 | (United States) Beaver Creek, USA | Super-G | 3rd |
| 2018 | 20 Jan 2018 | Kitzbühel, Austria | Downhill | 3rd |

== World Championship results ==
Year
| Year | Age | Slalom | Giant slalom | Super G | Downhill | Combined |
| 2003 | 22 | — | — | DNF | — | — |
| 2007 | 26 | — | DNF1 | — | — | — |
| 2009 | 28 | — | 30 | — | — | — |
| 2011 | 30 | — | — | 2 | 16 | — |
| 2013 | 32 | — | — | 4 | DNF | — |
| 2015 | 34 | — | — | 1 | 13 | — |
| 2017 | 36 | — | — | 10 | 17 | — |
| 2019 | 38 | — | — | DNF | 29 | — |

== Olympic results ==
Year
| Year | Age | Slalom | Giant slalom | Super G | Downhill | Combined |
| 2006 | 25 | — | — | 10 | — | — |
| 2010 | 29 | Injured: did not compete | | | | |
| 2014 | 33 | Injured: did not compete | | | | |
| 2018 | 37 | — | — | 11 | 12 | — |
