= Birds of Prey (ski course) =

World Cup downhill ski course in the western United States

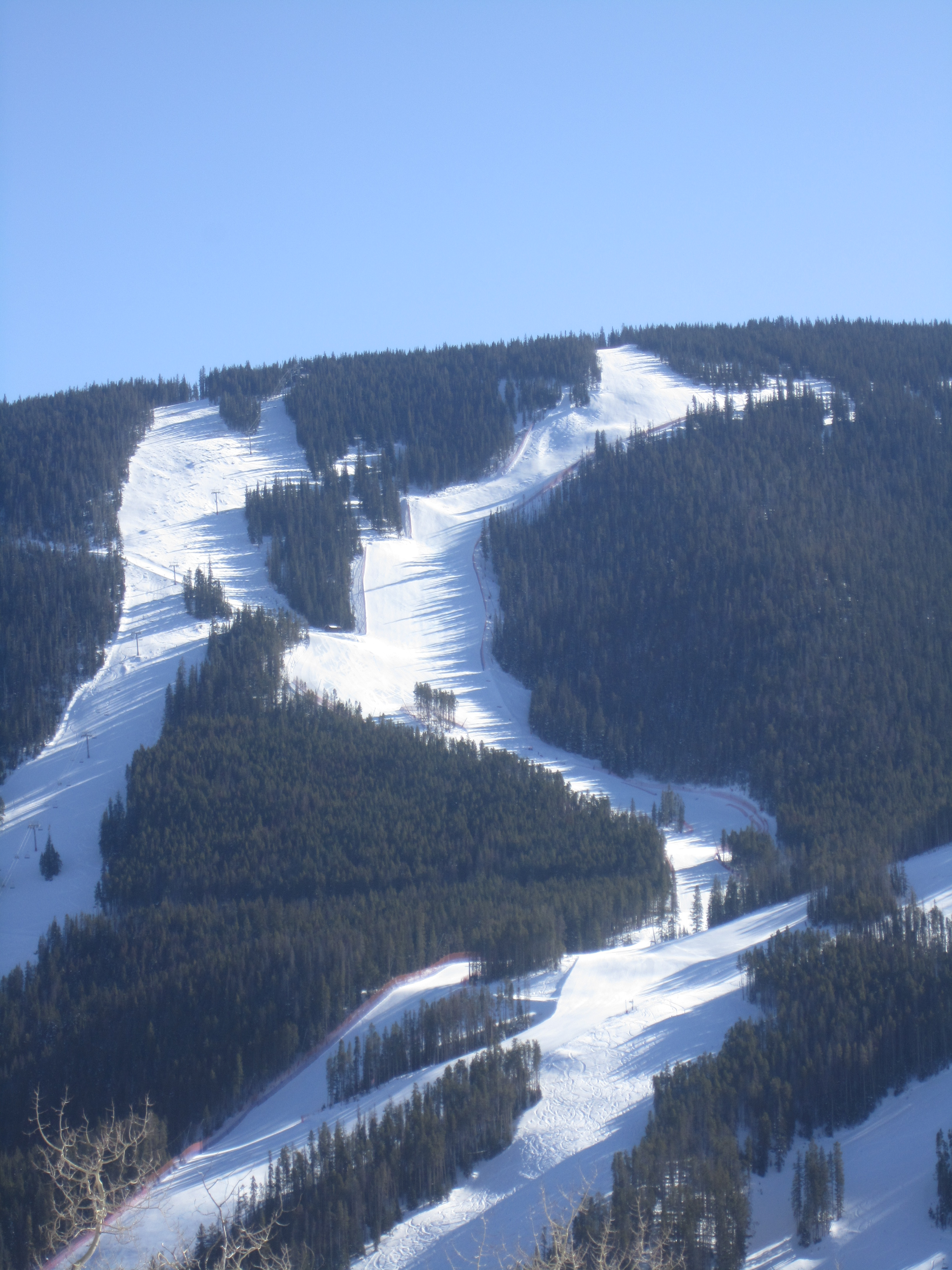
- December 2011
- Interactive map of Birds of Prey
- Location within the United States Location within Colorado
- 39°34′59″N 106°31′23″W
- Location: Avon, Colorado, United States
- Mountain: Beaver Creek Mountain
- Resort: Beaver Creek Resort
- Opened: December 1997 (race course); 29 years ago
- Architect: Bernhard Russi (SUI)
- Level: expert

Downhill
- Start: 11,427 ft (3,483 m) AMSL
- Finish: 8,957 ft (2,730 m)
- Vertical drop: 2,470 ft (753 m)
- Max incline: 32.3 degrees (63%)
- Avg incline: 17 degrees (31%)
- Most Wins (M): (Norway) Aksel Lund Svindal (4x)

Super-G
- Start: 11,155 ft (3,400 m)
- Finish: 8,957 ft (2,730 m)
- Vertical drop: 2,201 ft (671 m)
- Avg incline: 19.3 degrees (35%)
- Most Wins (M): (Austria) Hannes Reichelt (4x)

Giant slalom
- Start: 10,249 ft (3,124 m)
- Finish: 8,937 ft (2,724 m)
- Vertical drop: 1,312 ft (400 m)
- Max incline: 26.7 degrees (50%)
- Avg incline: 17 degrees (31%)
- Most Wins (M): (United States) Ted Ligety (6x)

Birds of Prey is a World Cup downhill ski course in the western United States, located at Beaver Creek Resort in Avon, Colorado. The race course made its World Cup debut 29 years ago in December 1997.

Beaver Creek is a traditional early December stop on the men's World Cup calendar. The course hosted the World Championships in 1999 and 2015, and is also used for super-G and giant slalom races. Prior to 1995, the World Cup speed events in North America were usually held in the latter part of the racing season.

This course has hosted total of 65 men's World Cup events (eighth all-time), and an additional three speed events in March 1988 were on "Centennial", the former speed course at Beaver Creek.

In December 2021, Birds of Prey became the first course in World Cup history to host four speed events on four consecutive days (two downhills, two super-G's).

== History ==
The Birds of Prey course was developed for the 1999 World Championships, designed by Swiss Olympic downhill champion Bernhard Russi, a noted constructor of downhill race courses around the world.

The first World Cup race was won by Kristian Ghedina of Italy in December 1997, but the course was then dominated by Austrians, led by the legendary Hermann Maier. He won three consecutive Birds of Prey downhills: the 1999 world title in front of 20,000 spectators, followed by World Cup victories in each of the next two seasons.

All rounder Lasse Kjus won record all five discipline medals at 1999 World Championships (two gold and three silver medals). This outstanding achievement has not yet been repeated.

In December 2004, Bode Miller and Daron Rahlves took first and second place, respectively, in the World Cup downhill race, the first ever one-two finish for American men in a downhill, and the first in any event in over two decades, since Phil & Steve Mahre in the 1984 Olympic slalom. The two Americans switched positions on the podium the following year.

Due to a lack of snow in France at Val d'Isère in December 2011, the women's super G was replaced on Birds of Prey course. This is the only World Cup event for ladies held here until the 2024 World Cup event. Lindsey Vonn took the win.

In November 2018, weather forced a lower start at 11,158 ft (3,401 m), reducing the course length to 1.286 miles (2.070 km) with a vertical drop of 2,201 ft (671 m). With the flat section of the top eliminated, the winning time of 1:13.59 by Beat Feuz yielded an average speed of 62.9 mph (101.2 km/h) and an average vertical descent of 29.9 feet (9.1 m) per second.

== Course ==
The downhill starting gate is at an elevation of 11,427 ft (3,483 m) above sea level, Super-G at 11,155 ft (3,400 m), and giant slalom at 10,249 ft (3,124 m) with the finish line at 8,957 ft (2,730 m).

The course is 1.71 miles (2.752 km) in length, an average gradient of 31 percent (17 degrees), with a maximum gradient of 68 percent (34 degrees) in the middle.

Rahlves' time of 1:39.59 in December 2003 is the fastest in competition for the full course, an average speed of 61.0 miles per hour (98.2 km/h) and an average vertical descent of 24.9 feet (7.6 m) per second.

The course that year had a vertical drop of 2,484 feet (757 m) and a length of 1.687 miles (2.715 km).

The Red Tail Camp finish area is about 800 vertical feet (240 m) above the resort's main village.

=== Sections ===
- The Flyaway
- The Brink
- The Talon
- Pete's Arena
- Peregrine (jump)
- Rahlves' Roll
- Russi's Ride
- Goshawk (jump)
- Screech Owl (jump)
- Ligety's Legacy
- Golden Eagle (jump)
- The Abyss
- Miller's Revenge
- Harrier (jump)
- Red Tail (jump)

== World Championships ==
=== Men's events ===
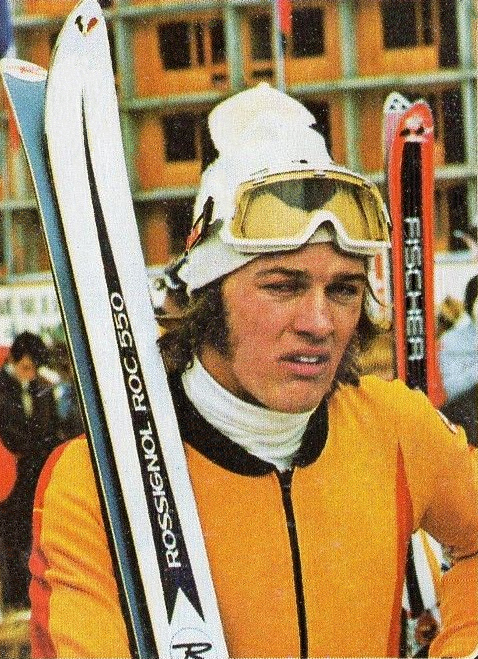
Bernhard Russi; (course constructor)

Only three events were held on Birds of Prey at the first championships; GS and SL were held at nearby Vail.

| Event | Type | Date | Gold | Silver | Bronze |
|---|---|---|---|---|---|
| 1999 | SG | 2 February 1999 | (Norway) Lasse Kjus | (Austria) Hermann Maier | (Austria) Hans Knauß |
| 1999 | DH | 6 February 1999 | (Austria) Hermann Maier | (Norway) Lasse Kjus | (Norway) Kjetil André Aamodt |
| 1999 | KB | 8–9 February 1999 | (Norway) Kjetil André Aamodt | (Norway) Lasse Kjus | (Switzerland) Paul Accola |
| 2015 | SG | 5 February 2015 | (Austria) Hannes Reichelt | (Canada) Dustin Cook | (France) Adrien Théaux |
| 2015 | DH | 7 February 2015 | (Switzerland) Patrick Küng | (United States) Travis Ganong | (Switzerland) Beat Feuz |
| 2015 | KB | 8 February 2015 | (Austria) Marcel Hirscher | (Norway) Kjetil Jansrud | (United States) Ted Ligety |
| 2015 | GS | 13 February 2015 | (United States) Ted Ligety | (Austria) Marcel Hirscher | (France) Alexis Pinturault |
| 2015 | SL | 15 February 2015 | (France) Jean-Baptiste Grange | (Germany) Fritz Dopfer | (Germany) Felix Neureuther |

=== Women's events ===
Only SL was held on Birds of Prey at second championships (none of first); the other women's events were held at nearby Vail.

| Event | Type | Date | Gold | Silver | Bronze |
|---|---|---|---|---|---|
| 2015 | SL | 14 February 2015 | (United States) Mikaela Shiffrin | (Sweden) Frida Hansdotter | (Czech Republic) Šárka Strachová |

== World Cup ==
| Ted Ligety (USA) | Aksel Lund Svindal (NOR) | Hannes Reichelt (AUT) |
|---|---|---|
| 300x | 300x | 300x |
| Won record 6 giant slaloms | Won record 4 downhills | won record 4 super-G's |

=== Men ===
DH – Downhill, SL – Slalom, GS – Giant slalom, SG – Super giant slalom, SC – Super combined
| No. | Type | Season | Date | Winner | Second | Third |
|---|---|---|---|---|---|---|
| 937 | DH | 1997/98 | 4 December 1997 | (Italy) Kristian Ghedina | (France) Jean-Luc Crétier | (Norway) Lasse Kjus |
| 938 | DH | 1997/98 | 5 December 1997 | (Austria) Andreas Schifferer | (Austria) Hermann Maier | (Austria) Stephan Eberharter |
| 939 | SG | 1997/98 | 5 December 1997 | (Austria) Hermann Maier | (Austria) Stephan Eberharter | (Austria) Hans Knauß |
| 1008 | DH | 1999/00 | 27 November 1999 | (Austria) Hermann Maier | (Austria) Stephan Eberharter | (Italy) Kristian Ghedina |
| 1009 | SG | 1999/00 | 28 November 1999 | (Austria) Hermann Maier | (Austria) Stephan Eberharter | (Norway) Lasse Kjus |
| 1050 | DH | 2000/01 | 2 December 2000 | (Austria) Hermann Maier | (Norway) Lasse Kjus | (Austria) Stephan Eberharter |
| 1051 | SG | 2000/01 | 3 December 2000 | (Sweden) Fredrik Nyberg | (Austria) Christoph Gruber | (Norway) Kenneth Sivertsen |
| | DH | 2001/02 | 1 December 2001 | replaced in Bormio on 28 December 2001 | | |
| | SG | 2001/02 | 2 December 2001 | replaced in Val d'Isère on 7 December 2001 | | |
| 1118 | DH | 2002/03 | 7 December 2002 | (Austria) Stephan Eberharter | (Austria) Michael Walchhofer | (United States) Daron Rahlves |
| 1119 | SG | 2002/03 | 8 December 2002 | (Switzerland) Didier Cuche | (Liechtenstein) Marco Büchel | (Austria) Hannes Trinkl |
| 1155 | DH | 2003/04 | 5 December 2003 | (United States) Daron Rahlves | (Austria) Stephan Eberharter (Norway) Bjarne Solbakken | |
| 1156 | DH | 2003/04 | 6 December 2003 | (Austria) Hermann Maier | (Austria) Hans Knauß | (Austria) Andreas Schifferer |
| 1157 | SG | 2003/04 | 7 December 2003 | (Norway) Bjarne Solbakken | (Austria) Hermann Maier | (Austria) Hans Knauß |
| 1192 | SG | 2004/05 | 2 December 2004 | (Austria) Stephan Görgl | (United States) Bode Miller | (Austria) Mario Scheiber |
| 1193 | DH | 2004/05 | 3 December 2004 | (United States) Bode Miller | (United States) Daron Rahlves | (Austria) Michael Walchhofer |
| 1194 | GS | 2004/05 | 4 December 2004 | (Norway) Lasse Kjus | (Austria) Hermann Maier | (Austria) Benjamin Raich |
| 1195 | SL | 2004/05 | 5 December 2004 | (Austria) Benjamin Raich | (Italy) Giorgio Rocca | (Austria) Rainer Schönfelder |
| 1228 | SG | 2005/06 | 1 December 2005 | (Austria) Hannes Reichelt | (Canada) Erik Guay | (Austria) Matthias Lanzinger |
| 1229 | DH | 2005/06 | 2 December 2005 | (United States) Daron Rahlves | (United States) Bode Miller | (Austria) Hans Grugger |
| 1230 | SG | 2005/06 | 3 December 2005 | (United States) Bode Miller | (United States) Daron Rahlves | (Finland) Kalle Palander |
| 1231 | SL | 2005/06 | 4 December 2005 | (Italy) Giorgio Rocca | (France) Stéphane Tissot | (United States) Ted Ligety |
| 1265 | SC | 2006/07 | 30 November 2006 | (Norway) Aksel Lund Svindal | (Switzerland) Marc Berthod | (Austria) Rainer Schönfelder |
| 1266 | DH | 2006/07 | 1 December 2006 | (United States) Bode Miller | (Switzerland) Didier Cuche | (United States) Steven Nyman |
| 1267 | GS | 2006/07 | 2 December 2006 | (Italy) Massimiliano Blardone | (Norway) Aksel Lund Svindal | (United States) Ted Ligety |
| 1268 | SL | 2006/07 | 3 December 2006 | (Sweden) André Myhrer | (Canada) Michael Janyk | (Germany) Felix Neureuther |
| 1302 | SC | 2007/08 | 29 November 2007 | (Switzerland) Daniel Albrecht | (France) Jean-Baptiste Grange | (Czech Republic) Ondřej Bank |
| 1303 | DH | 2007/08 | 30 November 2007 | (Austria) Michael Walchhofer | (United States) Steven Nyman | (Switzerland) Didier Cuche |
| 1304 | GS | 2007/08 | 2 December 2007 | (Switzerland) Daniel Albrecht | (Austria) Mario Matt | (Switzerland) Didier Cuche |
| 1305 | SG | 2007/08 | 3 December 2007 | (Austria) Hannes Reichelt | (Austria) Mario Scheiber | (Austria) Christoph Gruber |
| | SC | 2008/09 | 4 December 2008 | heavy snowfall; replaced in Val d'Isère on 12 December 2008 | | |
| 1442 | DH | 2008/09 | 5 December 2008 | (Norway) Aksel Lund Svindal | (Liechtenstein) Marco Buechel | (Canada) Erik Guay |
| 1443 | SG | 2008/09 | 6 December 2008 | (Norway) Aksel Lund Svindal | (Austria) Hermann Maier | (Austria) Michael Walchhofer |
| 1344 | GS | 2008/09 | 7 December 2008 | (Austria) Benjamin Raich | (United States) Ted Ligety | (Norway) Aksel Lund Svindal |
| 1378 | SC | 2009/10 | 4 December 2009 | (Switzerland) Carlo Janka | (Switzerland) Didier Défago | (Croatia) Natko Zrnčić-Dim |
| 1379 | DH | 2009/10 | 5 December 2009 | (Switzerland) Carlo Janka | (Switzerland) Didier Cuche | (Norway) Aksel Lund Svindal |
| 1380 | GS | 2009/10 | 6 December 2009 | (Switzerland) Carlo Janka | (Austria) Benjamin Raich | (Norway) Aksel Lund Svindal |
| | DH | 2010/11 | 3 December 2010 | strong winds; replaced in Kvitfjell on 11 March 2011 | | |
| 1411 | SG | 2010/11 | 4 December 2010 | (Austria) Georg Streitberger | (France) Adrien Théaux | (Switzerland) Didier Cuche |
| 1412 | GS | 2010/11 | 5 December 2010 | (United States) Ted Ligety | (Norway) Kjetil Jansrud | (Austria) Marcel Hirscher |
| 1447 | DH | 2011/12 | 2 December 2011 | (United States) Bode Miller | (Switzerland) Beat Feuz | (Austria) Klaus Kröll |
| 1448 | SG | 2011/12 | 3 December 2011 | (Switzerland) Sandro Viletta | (Norway) Aksel Lund Svindal | (Switzerland) Beat Feuz |
| 1449 | GS | 2011/12 | 4 December 2011 | (Austria) Marcel Hirscher | (United States) Ted Ligety | (Germany) Fritz Dopfer |
| 1450 | GS | 2011/12 | 6 December 2011 | (United States) Ted Ligety | (Austria) Marcel Hirscher | (Norway) Kjetil Jansrud |
| 1451 | SL | 2011/12 | 8 December 2011 | (Croatia) Ivica Kostelić | (Italy) Cristian Deville | (Austria) Marcel Hirscher |
| 1492 | DH | 2012/13 | 30 November 2012 | (Italy) Christof Innerhofer | (Norway) Aksel Lund Svindal | (Norway) Kjetil Jansrud |
| 1943 | SG | 2012/13 | 1 December 2012 | (Italy) Matteo Marsaglia | (Norway) Aksel Lund Svindal | (Austria) Hannes Reichelt |
| 1494 | GS | 2012/13 | 2 December 2012 | (United States) Ted Ligety | (Austria) Marcel Hirscher | (Italy) Davide Simoncelli |
| 1526 | DH | 2013/14 | 6 December 2013 | (Norway) Aksel Lund Svindal | (Austria) Hannes Reichelt | (Italy) Peter Fill |
| 1527 | SG | 2013/14 | 7 December 2013 | (Switzerland) Patrick Küng | (Austria) Otmar Striedinger | (Italy) Peter Fill (Austria) Hannes Reichelt |
| 1528 | GS | 2013/14 | 8 December 2013 | (United States) Ted Ligety | (United States) Bode Miller | (Austria) Marcel Hirscher |
| 1560 | DH | 2014/15 | 5 December 2014 | (Norway) Kjetil Jansrud | (Switzerland) Beat Feuz | (United States) Steven Nyman |
| 1561 | SG | 2014/15 | 6 December 2014 | (Austria) Hannes Reichelt | (Norway) Kjetil Jansrud | (France) Alexis Pinturault |
| 1562 | GS | 2014/15 | 7 December 2014 | (United States) Ted Ligety | (France) Alexis Pinturault | (Austria) Marcel Hirscher |
| 1596 | DH | 2015/16 | 4 December 2015 | (Norway) Aksel Lund Svindal | (Norway) Kjetil Jansrud | (France) Guillermo Fayed |
| 1597 | SG | 2015/16 | 5 December 2015 | (Austria) Marcel Hirscher | (United States) Ted Ligety | (United States) Andrew Weibrecht |
| 1598 | GS | 2015/16 | 6 December 2015 | (Austria) Marcel Hirscher | (France) Victor Muffat-Jeandet | (Norway) Henrik Kristoffersen |
| | SG | 2016/17 | 2 December 2016 | warm temperatures in November; replaced in Val d'Isère | | |
| | DH | 2016/17 | 3 December 2017 | warm temperatures in November; replaced in Val d'Isère | | |
| | GS | 2016/17 | 4 December 2016 | warm temperatures in November; replaced in Val d'Isère | | |
| 1676 | SG | 2017/18 | 1 December 2017 | (Austria) Vincent Kriechmayr | (Norway) Kjetil Jansrud | (Austria) Hannes Reichelt |
| 1677 | DH | 2017/18 | 2 December 2017 | (Norway) Aksel Lund Svindal | (Switzerland) Beat Feuz | (Germany) Thomas Dreßen |
| 1678 | GS | 2017/18 | 3 December 2017 | (Austria) Marcel Hirscher | (Norway) Henrik Kristoffersen | (Germany) Stefan Luitz |
| 1712 | DH | 2018/19 | 30 November 2018 | (Switzerland) Beat Feuz | (Switzerland) Mauro Caviezel | (Norway) Aksel Lund Svindal |
| 1713 | SG | 2018/19 | 1 December 2018 | (Austria) Max Franz | (Switzerland) Mauro Caviezel | (Norway) Aleksander Aamodt Kilde (Italy) Dominik Paris (Norway) Aksel Lund Svindal |
| 1714 | GS | 2018/19 | 2 December 2018 | (Germany) Stefan Luitz | (Austria) Marcel Hirscher | (Switzerland) Thomas Tumler |
| 1751 | SG | 2019/20 | 6 December 2019 | (Switzerland) Marco Odermatt | (Norway) Aleksander Aamodt Kilde | (Austria) Matthias Mayer |
| 1752 | DH | 2019/20 | 7 December 2019 | (Switzerland) Beat Feuz | (France) Johan Clarey (Austria) Vincent Kriechmayr | |
| 1753 | GS | 2019/20 | 8 December 2019 | (United States) Tommy Ford | (Norway) Henrik Kristoffersen | (Norway) L. K. Nestvold-Haugen |
| | SG | 2020/21 | 4 December 2020 | North American Tour cancelled before the season; due to the COVID-19 pandemic | | |
| | DH | 2020/21 | 5 December 2020 | North American Tour cancelled before the season; due to the COVID-19 pandemic | | |
| | GS | 2020/21 | 6 December 2020 | North American Tour cancelled before the season; due to the COVID-19 pandemic | | |
| 1822 | SG | 2021/22 | 2 December 2021 | (Switzerland) Marco Odermatt | (Austria) Matthias Mayer | (Canada) Broderick Thompson |
| 1823 | SG | 2021/22 | 3 December 2021 | (Norway) Aleksander Aamodt Kilde | (Switzerland) Marco Odermatt | (United States) Travis Ganong |
| 1824 | DH | 2021/22 | 4 December 2021 | (Norway) Aleksander Aamodt Kilde | (Austria) Matthias Mayer | (Switzerland) Beat Feuz |
| | DH | 2021/22 | 5 December 2021 | rescheduled from Lake Louise; but due to strong wind moved to Kvitfjell on 4 March 2022 | | |
| | DH | 2022/23 | 2 December 2022 | heavy snowfall; moved to Val Gardena/Gröden on 15 December 2022 | | |
| 1858 | DH | 2022/23 | 3 December 2022 | (Norway) Aleksander Aamodt Kilde | (Switzerland) Marco Odermatt | (Canada) James Crawford |
| 1859 | SG | 2022/23 | 4 December 2022 | (Norway) Aleksander Aamodt Kilde | (Switzerland) Marco Odermatt | (France) Alexis Pinturault |
| | DH | 2023/24 | 1 December 2023 | cancelled due to heavy snowfall and strong wind; one downhill moved to Wengen | | |
| | DH | 2023/24 | 2 December 2023 | cancelled due to heavy snowfall and strong wind; one downhill moved to Wengen | | |
| | SG | 2023/24 | 3 December 2023 | cancelled due to heavy snowfall and strong wind; one downhill moved to Wengen | | |
| 1931 | DH | 2024/25 | 6 December 2024 | (Switzerland) Justin Murisier | (Switzerland) Marco Odermatt | (Slovenia) Miha Hrobat |
| 1932 | SG | 2024/25 | 7 December 2024 | (Switzerland) Marco Odermatt | (France) Cyprien Sarrazin | (Austria) Lukas Feurstein |
| 1933 | GS | 2024/25 | 8 December 2024 | (Switzerland) Thomas Tumler | (Brazil) Lucas Pinheiro Braathen | (Slovenia) Žan Kranjec |
| | DH | 2025/26 | 4 December 2025 | cancelled due to lack of snow | | |
| 1970 | DH | 2025/26 | 4 December 2025 | (Switzerland) Marco Odermatt | (United States) Ryan Cochran-Siegle | (Norway) Adrian Smiseth Sejersted |
| | DH | 2025/26 | 5 December 2025 | rescheduled to 4 December due to bad weather forecast | | |
| 1971 | SG | 2025/26 | 5 December 2025 | (Austria) Vincent Kriechmayr | (Norway) Fredrik Møller | (Austria) Raphael Haaser |
| | SG | 2025/26 | 6 December 2025 | rescheduled to 5 December due to bad weather forecast | | |
| 1972 | GS | 2025/26 | 7 December 2025 | (Switzerland) Marco Odermatt | (Italy) Alex Vinatzer | (Norway) Henrik Kristoffersen |

=== Women ===
| No. | Type | Season | Date | Winner | Second | Third |
|---|---|---|---|---|---|---|
| 1357 | SG | 2011/12 | 7 December 2011 | (United States) Lindsey Vonn | (Switzerland) Fabienne Suter | (Austria) Anna Fenninger |
| 1427 | GS | 2013/14 | 1 December 2013 | (Sweden) Jessica Lindell-Vikarby | (United States) Mikaela Shiffrin | (Liechtenstein) Tina Weirather |
| 1819 | DH | 2024/25 | 14 December 2024 | (Austria) Cornelia Hütter | (Italy) Sofia Goggia | (Switzerland) Lara Gut-Behrami |
| 1820 | SG | 2024/25 | 15 December 2024 | (Italy) Sofia Goggia | (Switzerland) Lara Gut-Behrami | (Austria) Ariane Rädler |

Not on the original World Cup calendar, it replaced Val d'Isère (2011) and Lake Louise (2021).

== Raptor ==
Adjacent to Birds of Prey on Beaver Creek Mountain, a new women's downhill course was built for the 2015 World Championships.

Parallel sloped called Raptor, has hosted two of three women's World Cup events in November 2013 as a test.

== Video ==
- You Tube.com - The Birds of Prey Downhill - From Jalbert Production's The Thin Line
- You Tube.com - Hans Knauss - Audi Birds of Prey POV Downhill - December 2010
