= FIS Alpine World Ski Championships 2013 =

Skiing event in Schladming, Austria

Coordinates: 47.392°N 13.694°E

42nd FIS Alpine World Ski Championships
- Host city: Schladming, Styria, Austria
- Nations: 72
- Athletes: 614
- Events: 11
- Opening: 4 February 2013
- Closing: 17 February 2013
- Opened by: Heinz Fischer
- Main venue: Planai
- Website: schladming2013.at

Location in Austria
Location in the Alps of Europe

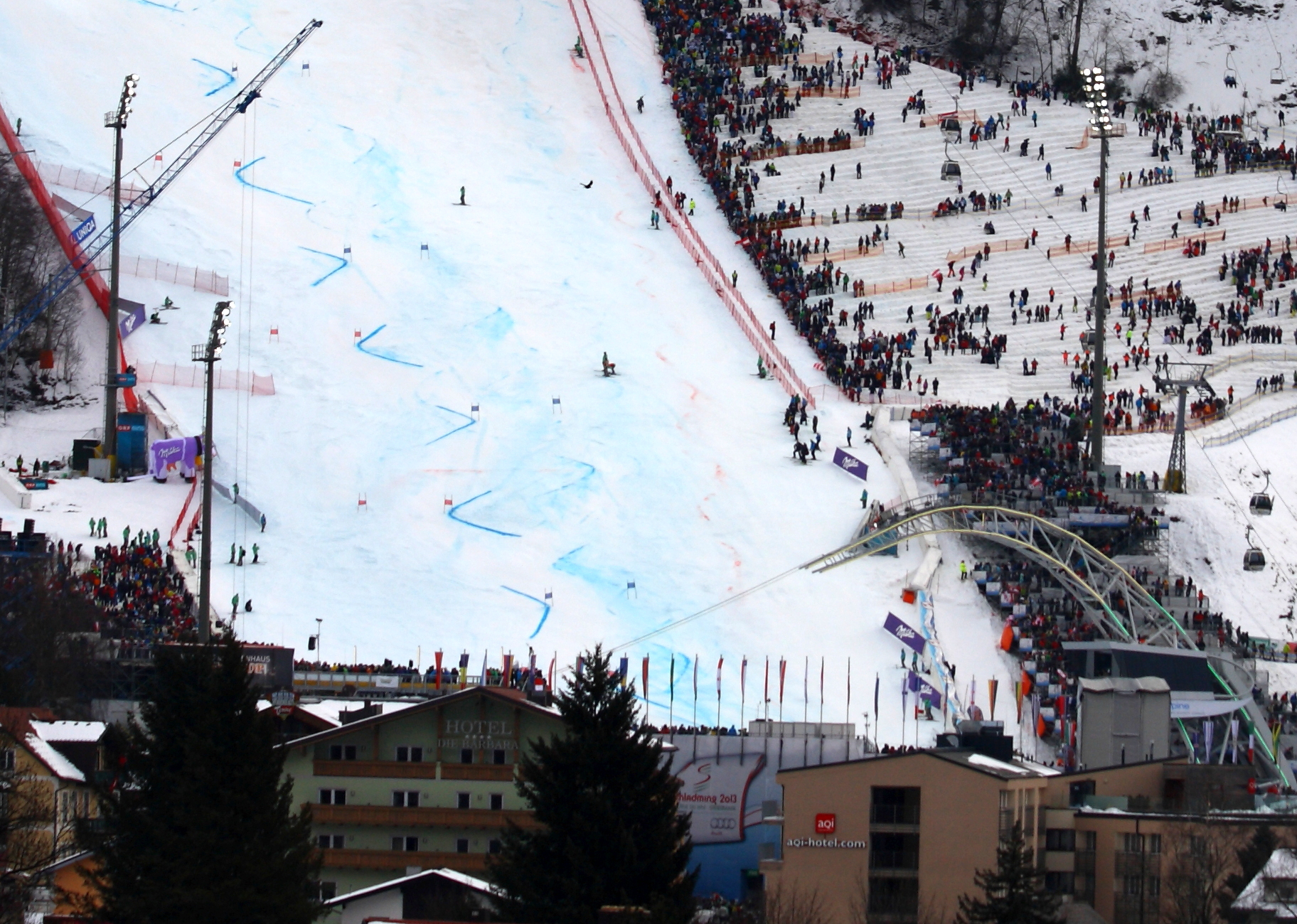
Finish area of the Planai Stadium, 2013 Alpine Ski World Championships in Schladming

The FIS Alpine World Ski Championships 2013 were the 42nd FIS Alpine World Ski Championships, held 4–17 February in Austria at Planai in Schladming, Styria. A record number of athletes and countries took part in this championships. Schladming previously hosted the 1982 World Championships, and prior to acquiring the 2013 event, it made two unsuccessful bids to host.

The FIS awarded the 2013 championships to Schladming on 29 May 2008, in Cape Town, South Africa. The other three finalists were Beaver Creek in Vail, United States, Cortina d'Ampezzo, Italy, and St. Moritz, Switzerland. Beaver Creek/Vail hosted in 2015 and St. Moritz gained the championships for 2017.

== Course information ==
Course information – (metric/feet)
Day	Date	Time (UTC+1)	Race	Start elevation	Finish elevation	Vertical drop	Course length	Gates	Maximum gradient	Course name	Sky
Tue	05-Feb	14:30	Women's super-G	1331 m / 4367 ft	771 m / 2529 ft	560 m / 1837 ft	2.218 km / 1.378 mi	49	48% (25.6°)	Streicher	cloudy
Wed	06-Feb	11:00	Men's super-G	1348 m / 4422 ft	777 m / 2549 ft	571 m / 1873 ft	1.885 km / 1.187 mi	42	52% (27.5°)	Planai	cloudy
Fri	08-Feb	10:00	Women's super combined – Downhill	1479 m / 4852 ft	771 m / 2529 ft	708 m / 2322 ft	3.050 km / 1.895 mi	45	48% (25.6°)	Streicher	sunny
Fri	08-Feb	14:00	Women's super combined – Slalom	940 m / 3084 ft	745 m / 2444 ft	195 m / 640 ft		60	49% (26.1°)	Streicher	sunny
Sat	09-Feb	11:00	Men's downhill	1753 m / 5771 ft	777 m / 2549 ft	976 m / 3202 ft	3.334 km / 2.072 mi	39	72% (35.7°)	Planai	cloudy
Sun	10-Feb	11:00	Women's downhill	1479 m / 4852 ft	771 m / 2529 ft	708 m / 2322 ft	3.050 km / 1.895 mi	45	48% (25.6°)	Streicher	sunny
Mon	11-Feb	12:00	Men's super combined – Downhill	1753 m / 5771 ft	777 m / 2549 ft	976 m / 3202 ft	3.366 km / 2.092 mi	39	72% (35.7°)	Planai	sunny
Mon	11-Feb	18:15	Men's super combined – Slalom	963 m / 3159 ft	745 m / 2444 ft	218 m / 715 ft	0.585 km / 0.363 mi	64	48% (25.6°)	Planai	cloudy
Tue	12-Feb	17:00	Team event	838 m / 2749 ft	745 m / 2444 ft	93 m / 305 ft	260 m / 853 ft	20	46% (24.7°)	Planai	cloudy
Thu	14-Feb	10:00; 13:30	Women's giant slalom – Run 1 Women's giant slalom – Run 2	1105 m / 3635 ft	745 m / 2444 ft	360 m / 1181 ft	1.052 km / 0.654 mi	42; 45	52% (27.5°)	Planai	sunny
Fri	15-Feb	10:00; 13:30	Men's giant slalom – Run 1 Men's giant slalom – Run 2	1148 m / 2438 ft	745 m / 2444 ft	403 m / 1322 ft	1.218 km / 0.757 mi	53; 53	52% (27.5°)	Planai	sunny
Sat	16-Feb	10:00; 13:30	Women's slalom – Run 1 Women's slalom – Run 2	920 m / 3018 ft	740 m / 2427 ft	180 m / 590 ft	0.566 km / 0.352 mi	61; 63	49% (26.1°)	Streicher	cloudy cloudy
Sun	17-Feb	10:00; 13:30	Men's slalom – Run 1 Men's slalom – Run 2	963 m / 3159 ft	740 m / 2427 ft	223 m / 731 ft	0.585 km / 0.364 mi	66; 66	48% (25.6°)	Planai	cloudy cloudy

== Medal winners ==
=== Men's events ===
Event	Gold		Silver		Bronze	
Downhill	Aksel Lund Svindal; Norway	2:01.32	Dominik Paris; Italy	2:01.78	David Poisson; France	2:02.29
Super-G	Ted Ligety; United States	1:23.96	Gauthier de Tessières; France	1:24.16	Aksel Lund Svindal; Norway	1:24.18
Giant slalom	Ted Ligety; United States	2:28.92	Marcel Hirscher; Austria	2:29.73	Manfred Mölgg; Italy	2:30.67
Slalom	Marcel Hirscher; Austria	1:51.03	Felix Neureuther; Germany	1:51.45	Mario Matt; Austria	1:51.68
Super combined	Ted Ligety; United States	2:56.96	Ivica Kostelić; Croatia	2:58.11	Romed Baumann; Austria	2:58.13

=== Women's events ===
Event	Gold		Silver		Bronze	
Downhill	Marion Rolland; France	1:50.00	Nadia Fanchini; Italy	1:50.16	Maria Höfl-Riesch; Germany	1:50.70
Super-G	Tina Maze; Slovenia	1:35.39	Lara Gut; Switzerland	1:35.77	Julia Mancuso; United States	1:35.91
Giant slalom	Tessa Worley; France	2:08.06	Tina Maze; Slovenia	2:09.18	Anna Fenninger; Austria	2:09.24
Slalom	Mikaela Shiffrin; United States	1:39.85	Michaela Kirchgasser; Austria	1:40.07	Frida Hansdotter; Sweden	1:40.11
Super combined	Maria Höfl-Riesch; Germany	2:39.92	Tina Maze; Slovenia	2:40.38	Nicole Hosp; Austria	2:40.92

=== Team event ===
Event	Gold	Silver	Bronze
Team event	Austria; Nicole Hosp; Michaela Kirchgasser; Carmen Thalmann; Marcel Hirscher; Marcel Mathis; Philipp Schörghofer	Sweden; Nathalie Eklund; Frida Hansdotter; Maria Pietilä Holmner; Jens Byggmark; Mattias Hargin; André Myhrer	Germany; Lena Dürr; Maria Höfl-Riesch; Veronique Hronek; Fritz Dopfer; Stefan Luitz; Felix Neureuther

== Medal table ==
* Host nation (Austria)

Rank	Nation	Gold	Silver	Bronze	Total
1	United States (USA)	4	0	1	5
2	Austria (AUT)*	2	2	4	8
3	France (FRA)	2	1	1	4
4	Slovenia (SLO)	1	2	0	3
5	Germany (GER)	1	1	2	4
6	Norway (NOR)	1	0	1	2
7	Italy (ITA)	0	2	1	3
8	Sweden (SWE)	0	1	1	2
9	Croatia (CRO)	0	1	0	1
9	Switzerland (SUI)	0	1	0	1
Totals (10 entries)		11	11	11	33

== Participating nations ==
614 athletes from 72 countries competed. Malta made its debut appearance.

- Albania (1)
- Andorra (6)
- Argentina (10)
- Armenia (5)
- Australia (10)
- Austria (37)
- Azerbaijan (1)
- Belarus (4)
- Belgium (12)
- Bosnia and Herzegovina (8)
- Brazil (2)
- Bulgaria (6)
- Canada (20)
- Chile (13)
- China (6)
- Croatia (18)
- Cyprus (4)
- Czech Republic (12)
- Denmark (10)
- Estonia (1)
- Finland (9)
- France (34)
- Georgia (5)
- Germany (20)
- Great Britain (2)
- Greece (8)
- Haiti (2)
- Hungary (18)
- Iceland (10)
- India (4)
- Iran (12)
- Ireland (3)
- Israel (4)
- Italy (24)
- Jamaica (1)
- Japan (7)
- Kazakhstan (5)
- Kyrgyzstan (7)
- Latvia (13)
- Lebanon (9)
- Liechtenstein (8)
- Lithuania (4)
- Luxembourg (3)
- Republic of Macedonia (5)
- Malta (1)
- Mexico (1)
- Moldova (2)
- Monaco (2)
- Montenegro (5)
- Netherlands (7)
- New Zealand (9)
- Norway (10)
- Poland (8)
- Peru (2)
- Portugal (2)
- Puerto Rico (1)
- Romania (1)
- Russia (17)
- San Marino (4)
- Serbia (8)
- Slovakia (11)
- Slovenia (22)
- South Africa (4)
- South Korea (1)
- Spain (4)
- Sweden (15)
- Switzerland (30)
- Chinese Taipei (2)
- Ukraine (7)
- United States (20)
- United States Virgin Islands (1)
- Uzbekistan (11)

== Injuries ==
On 5 February 2013, during the super-G, American Lindsey Vonn was involved in a severe crash and was airlifted to a nearby hospital. Vonn tore her anterior cruciate ligament and medial collateral ligament in her right knee and fractured her right tibia.
