= FIS Alpine World Ski Championships 2015 =

Skiing event in Colorado, USA

Coordinates: 39.583°N 106.523°W

43rd FIS Alpine World Ski Championships
- Host city: Vail / Beaver Creek, Colorado, U.S.
- Nations: 68
- Athletes: ~700
- Events: 11
- Opening: February 2, 2015
- Closing: February 15, 2015
- Opened by: Barack Obama
- Main venue: Beaver Creek
- Website: vailbeavercreek2015.com

Location in the United States

The FIS Alpine World Ski Championships 2015 were the 43rd FIS Alpine World Ski Championships, held from 2–15 February in the United States at Vail / Beaver Creek, Colorado.

Athletes from over 70 nations were expected, with a worldwide television audience of an estimated 1 billion and an onsite media and broadcast entourage of approximately 1,500. Competition began on Tuesday, February 3 and concluded on Sunday, February 15, covering 13 days and two weekends. There were five men’s and five women’s individual races, along with the nation’s team event, featuring a parallel giant slalom format. The team event was run at Vail and the other ten competitions at Beaver Creek, on or near the Birds of Prey course.

These were the third world championships for Vail / Beaver Creek, which previously hosted in 1989 and 1999. All the events in 1989 were held at Vail, and 1999 had events at both resorts, seven at Vail and three at Beaver Creek. Also in Colorado, Aspen hosted in 1950, which were the first championships held outside Europe, the first to include the giant slalom event, and the first alpine world ski championships outside the Olympics since 1939.

== Host selection ==
All three finalists for 2015 had attempted to host the 2013 championships, which were awarded in 2008 to Austria.

City	Country	Votes	Previous championships hosted
Vail / Beaver Creek, Colorado	United States	8	1999, 1989 (Vail only), orig. 1976 Winter Olympics (withdrawn 1972)
Cortina d'Ampezzo	Italy	4	1956 Winter Olympics, 1941 (later withdrawn), 1932
St. Moritz	Switzerland	3	2003, 1974, 1948 Winter Olympics, 1934

The winner was selected at the FIS Congress in Antalya, Turkey, on June 3, 2010.
Vail/Beaver Creek won in the first round with 8 votes to Cortina's 4 and St. Moritz's 3.

A new women's downhill course was built adjacent to the men's Birds of Prey course at Beaver Creek.

== Schedule and course information ==
All times are local (UTC−7).

Course information – (metric/feet)
Day	Date	Time	Race	Start elevation	Finish elevation	Vertical drop	Course length	Gates	Maximum gradient	Course name	Sky
Tue	3 Feb	11:00	Women's Super-G	3246 m / 10650 ft	2730 m / 8957 ft	516 m / 1693 ft	1.640 km / 1.119 mi	35	57% (30.0°)	Raptor	cloudy
Thu	5 Feb	11:00	Men's Super-G	3337 m / 10948 ft	2730 m / 8957 ft	671 m / 2201 ft	1.879 km / 1.167 mi	39	68% (32.3°)	Birds of Prey	cloudy
Fri	6 Feb	11:00	Women's Downhill	3440 m / 11283 ft	2730 m / 8954 ft	710 m / 2329 ft	3.050 km / 1.895 mi	41	59% (30.5°)	Raptor	cloudy
Sat	7 Feb	11:00	Men's Downhill	3483 m / 11424 ft	2730 m / 8954 ft	753 m / 2470 ft	2.623 km / 1.629 mi	36	63% (32.3°)	Birds of Prey	sunny
Sun	8 Feb	10:00	Men's Super Combined – Downhill	3483 m / 11424 ft	2730 m / 8954 ft	753 m / 2470 ft	2.623 km / 1.629 mi	36	63% (32.3°)	Birds of Prey	sunny
Sun	8 Feb	14:15	Men's Super Combined – Slalom	2935 m / 9627 ft	2724 m / 8935 ft	211 m / 692 ft	0.690 km / 0.429 mi	66	50% (26.7°)		sunny
Mon	9 Feb	10:00	Women's Super Combined – Downhill	3440 m / 11283 ft	2730 m / 8954 ft	710 m / 2329 ft	3.050 km / 1.895 mi	41	59% (30.5°)	Raptor	sunny
Mon	9 Feb	14:15	Women's Super Combined – Slalom	2911 m / 9548 ft	2724 m / 8935 ft	182 m / 613 ft	0.640 km / 0.398 mi	59	46% (24.8°)		sunny
Tue	10 Feb	14:15	Team Event	m / ft	m / ft	m / ft	m / ft				sunny
Thu	12 Feb	10:15; 14:15	Women's Giant Slalom – Run 1 Women's Giant Slalom – Run 2	3077 m / 10093 ft	2724 m / 8935 ft	353 m / 1158 ft	1.305 km / 0.811 mi	49; 49	50% (26.7°)		sunny
Fri	13 Feb	10:15; 14:15	Men's Giant Slalom – Run 1 Men's Giant Slalom – Run 2	3124 m / 10247 ft	2724 m / 8935 ft	400 m / 1312 ft	1.490 km / 0.926 mi	60; 59	50% (26.7°)		sunny
Sat	14 Feb	10:00; 14:15	Women's Slalom – Run 1 Women's Slalom – Run 2	2911 m / 9548 ft	2724 m / 8935 ft	187 m / 613 ft	0.640 km / 0.398 mi	61; 61	46% (24.8°)		sunny
Sun	15 Feb	10:15; 14:15	Men's Slalom – Run 1 Men's Slalom – Run 2	2935 m / 9627 ft	2724 m / 8935 ft	211 m / 692 ft	0.690 km / 0.429 mi	73; 70	50% (25.7°)		cloudy

- The women's Super-G was delayed 30 minutes due to strong winds. The start was lowered 74 m (243 ft), shortening the course by 200 m (220 yd).
- The men's Super-G was postponed a day due to adverse weather conditions.

== Medal winners ==
=== Men's events ===
Event	Gold		Silver		Bronze	
Downhill	Patrick Küng; Switzerland	1:43.18	Travis Ganong; United States	1:43.42	Beat Feuz; Switzerland	1:43.49
Super-G	Hannes Reichelt; Austria	1:15.68	Dustin Cook; Canada	1:15.79	Adrien Théaux; France	1:15.92
Giant Slalom	Ted Ligety; United States	2:34.16	Marcel Hirscher; Austria	2:34.61	Alexis Pinturault; France	2:35.04
Slalom	Jean-Baptiste Grange; France	1:57.47	Fritz Dopfer; Germany	1:57.82	Felix Neureuther; Germany	1:58.02
Super Combined	Marcel Hirscher; Austria	2:36.10	Kjetil Jansrud; Norway	2:36.29	Ted Ligety; United States	2:36.40

=== Women's events ===
Event	Gold		Silver		Bronze	
Downhill	Tina Maze; Slovenia	1:45.89	Anna Fenninger; Austria	1:45.91	Lara Gut; Switzerland	1:46.23
Super-G	Anna Fenninger; Austria	1:10.29	Tina Maze; Slovenia	1:10.32	Lindsey Vonn; United States	1:10.44
Giant Slalom	Anna Fenninger; Austria	2:19.16	Viktoria Rebensburg; Germany	2:20.56	Jessica Lindell-Vikarby; Sweden	2:20.65
Slalom	Mikaela Shiffrin; United States	1:38.48	Frida Hansdotter; Sweden	1:38.82	Šárka Strachová; Czech Republic	1:39.25
Super Combined	Tina Maze; Slovenia	2:33.37	Nicole Hosp; Austria	2:33.59	Michaela Kirchgasser; Austria	2:33.72

=== Team event ===
Event	Gold	Silver	Bronze
Team event	Austria; Eva-Maria Brem; Michaela Kirchgasser; Nicole Hosp; Marcel Hirscher; Christoph Nösig; Philipp Schörghofer	Canada; Candace Crawford; Erin Mielzynski; Marie-Pier Préfontaine; Phil Brown; Trevor Philp; Erik Read	Sweden; Maria Pietilä Holmner; Anna Swenn-Larsson; Sara Hector; Mattias Hargin; André Myhrer; Markus Larsson

== Medal table ==
* Host nation (United States)

Rank	Nation	Gold	Silver	Bronze	Total
1	Austria (AUT)	5	3	1	9
2	United States (USA)*	2	1	2	5
3	Slovenia (SLO)	2	1	0	3
4	France (FRA)	1	0	2	3
4	Switzerland (SUI)	1	0	2	3
6	Germany (GER)	0	2	1	3
7	Canada (CAN)	0	2	0	2
8	Sweden (SWE)	0	1	2	3
9	Norway (NOR)	0	1	0	1
10	Czech Republic (CZE)	0	0	1	1
Totals (10 entries)		11	11	11	33

- Host country highlighted.
