= Beaver Creek Resort =

Ski area in Colorado, United States

Beaver Creek
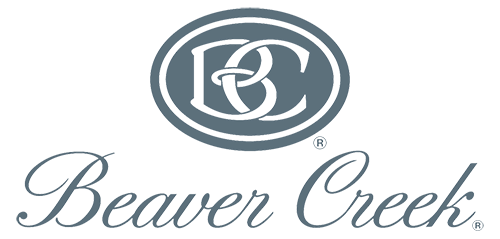

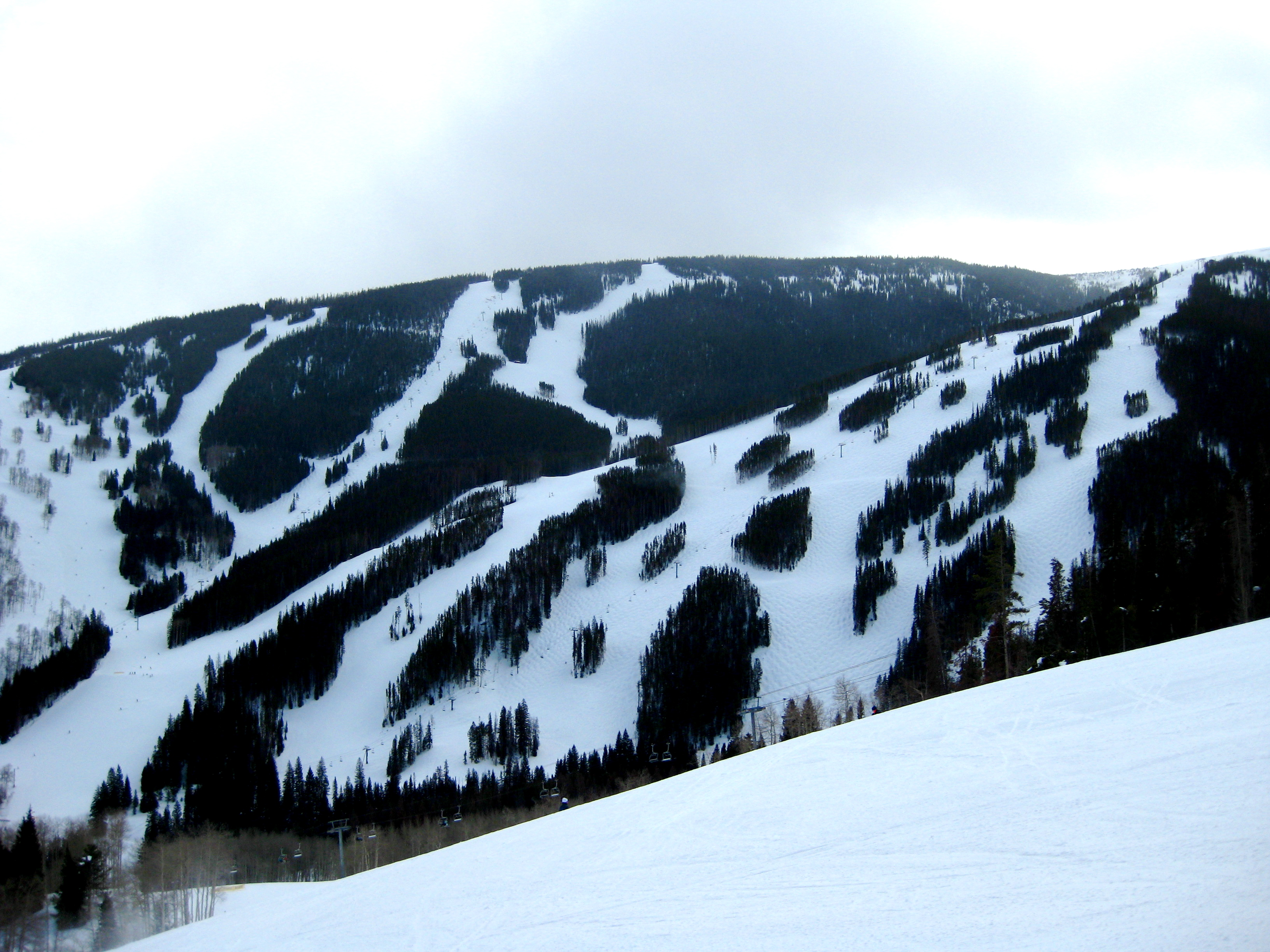
- Birds of Prey race course at Beaver Creek in 2009

- Location in Colorado Beaver Creek (the United States)
- Location: Eagle County, Colorado, U.S.
- Nearest city: Avon
- Coordinates: 39°37′53″N 106°31′18″W
- Status: Operating
- Owner: Vail Resorts
- Vertical: 3,340 feet (1,020 m)
- Top elevation: 11,440 feet (3,490 m)
- Base elevation: 8,100 feet (2,500 m)
- Skiable area: 2,082 acres (8.43 km^{2})
- Trails: 167 – 28% beginner – 38% intermediate – 34% advanced/expert
- Longest run: Centennial – 2.75 miles (4.4 km)
- Lift system: 24 total (2 gondolas, 1 Chondola, 12 high-speed quad chairs, 1 fixed-grip quad, 1 triple chair, 1 double chair, 6 "magic carpets")
- Terrain parks: Yes, 3
- Snowfall: 323 inches (820 cm) per yr
- Website: beavercreek.com

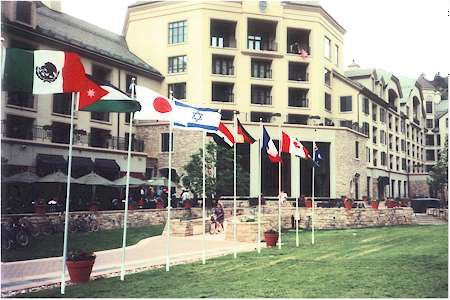
A Beaver Creek Village view.

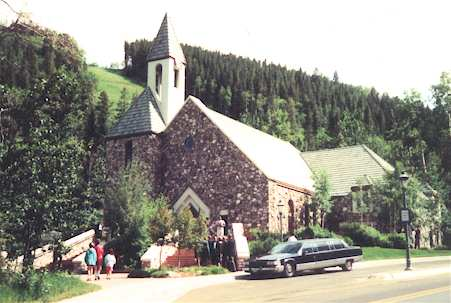
Beaver Creek Chapel.

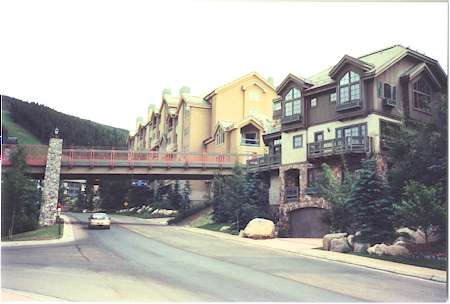
View at the Beaver Creek Village.

Beaver Creek Resort is an alpine ski resort in the western United States, near Avon, Colorado. The resort comprises three villages, the main Beaver Creek Village, Bachelor Gulch, and Arrowhead to the west. The resort is owned and operated by Vail Resorts which operates multiple additional resorts. Beaver Creek is a regular host of World Cup events, usually in early December.

== History ==
The valley that houses Beaver Creek Resort lies just south of Avon and was first settled in 1881. Many early pioneers moved to the area under President Abraham Lincoln's Homestead Act (1862), farming hay and raising cattle to feed local miners. Beaver Creek remained a lightly populated farming area through the middle of the twentieth century.

Beaver Creek Resort was envisioned in the 1950s by Earl Eaton, but it was not until the early 1970s that Pete Seibert tried to convince the Denver Organizing Committee to hold the 1976 Winter Olympics alpine events at the yet to be built ski resort. However, when Denver backed out from holding the Olympic Winter Games in November 1972, Seibert's plans of building the resort collapsed. When Vail Associates was purchased by Harry W. Bass Jr., an oil tycoon of Goliad Oil, he decided to develop Beaver Creek. The ski slope and first hotel property, The Charter at Beaver Creek, opened during the 1980–81 ski season. The resort had six chairlifts, all constructed by Doppelmayr: three triple and three double chairlifts. In 1983, Larkspur Bowl was opened with the addition of its own triple chairlift, accessible via the Strawberry Park region.

In 1985, Bass sold Beaver Creek and Vail Associates filed for bankruptcy a few years later. In 1986, Beaver Creek entered the high-speed-lift market with the installation of the Centennial Express on the main mountain, replacing the Centennial triple chairlift.

In 1989, the resort hosted the World Ski Championships, and repeated in 1999 and in 2015.

In 1991, a new pod of advanced terrain was opened on Grouse Mountain in the Talons area, with Garaventa-CTEC constructing a high-speed quad to service the new trails. CTEC would go on to install three more high speed quads during the 1990s, replacing the Strawberry Park triple in 1994 and the Stump Park triple on the main mountain with the Cinch Express in 1996. The former Strawberry Park triple was relocated and renamed Elkhorn, providing mountain access for real estate owners.

In 1993, Beaver Creek purchased the small, adjacent Arrowhead Mountain, formerly an independent resort catering to the beginner and lower intermediate skier with its own Doppelmayr-constructed high speed quad. In 1997, the two resorts were connected through the addition of Bachelor Gulch Village and a new high speed quad, known as the Bachelor Gulch Express.

For the 2003 season, Doppelmayr constructed a new high speed quad known as the Birds of Prey Express to replace the Westfall double chairlift, providing high speed lift service to the Birds of Prey downhill course. A year later, they built a pair of high speed quads in the Bachelor Gulch area to improve transiting from the Bachelor Gulch and Arrowhead region to Beaver Creek Mountain, as well as provide lift service from Avon. A year after that, they constructed the Larkspur Express to replace the Larkspur triple chairlift.

In 2007, two new gondolas were opened. The Riverfront Express Gondola was constructed to connect Avon to the Beaver Creek Landing and the Lower Beaver Creek Mountain Express lift, while the Haymeadow Gondola was built to replace one of two double chairlifts in the Beaver Creek Village learning area.

More improvements came in the 2011 season, as the Rose Bowl Express was constructed to replace the older triple chairlift. In 2014, massive changes occurred as Doppelmayr replaced the aging Centennial Express lift with a chondola, combining a high speed six pack with ten passenger gondola cabins.

In 2017, the last of Beaver Creek's original opening day lifts, the Drink of Water double chairlift, was removed and replaced with a high speed quad. The Red Buffalo Express supplements the older Cinch Express, and reused towers from the defunct Montezuma Express at Keystone Resort.

For the 2021–2022 season, a new beginner terrain pod was opened in McCoy Park, in between Larkspur Bowl and Strawberry Park. Two chairlifts were constructed to service the new area: a high speed quad servicing the pod, and a fixed grip quad named Reunion providing egress.

For the last several years, Beaver Creek has hosted the Audi "Birds of Prey" World Cup downhill ski races early in the season.

== Holy Cross Wilderness Area ==
Beaver Creek Resort is adjacent to the Holy Cross Wilderness in White River National Forest. Beaver Lake Trail passes through Beaver Creek Resort, beside Beaver Creek. Beaver Lake Trail crosses the wilderness area boundary immediately before reaching Beaver Lake. Beyond Beaver Lake, Beaver Lake Trail ascends south to Turqoise Lakes and Grouse Mountain.

== Beaver Creek Resort statistics ==
=== Elevation ===
- Lowest Point (Arrowhead Village): 7,400 feet (2,260 m)
- Base (Beaver Creek Village): 8,100 feet (2,470 m)
- Summit: 11,440 feet (3,490 m)
- Vertical Rise from base to summit: 3,340 feet (1,020 m)
- Vertical Rise from lowest point to summit: 4,040 feet (1,230 m)

=== Developed Terrain ===
- Mountains: 5 (Beaver Creek, Grouse Mountain, Larkspur, Arrowhead Mountain, Bachelor Gulch)
- Bowls: 2 (Rose Bowl, Larkspur Bowl)
- Skiable Area: 2,082 acres (8.43 km^{2})
- Trails: 167 total (28% beginner, 38% intermediate, 34% expert/advanced)
- Longest Run: Centennial
- Terrain Parks: 3
- Average Snowfall: 323 inches (820 cm) annually

=== Slope Aspects ===
- North: 55%
- West: 20%
- East: 25%
