= FIS Alpine World Ski Championships 2007 – Men's giant slalom qualification =

Event: giant slalom qualification men

Date: 12 February 2007

1st run start time: 10:00 CET

2nd run start time: 13:30 CET

== Information ==
This is the first time that the qualification race was organized at the World Championships due to the large number of participants. Top 50 athletes in the World Cup rankings qualified directly into the final. Other athletes competed in the qualification race where top 25 will qualify into the final.

== Results ==
Rank	Athlete	Nation	1st run	2nd run	Behind
1	Urs Imboden	Moldova	1:12.75	2:26.81	0
2	Akira Sasaki	Japan	1:12.92	2:27.54	+0.73
3	Dalibor Šamšal	Croatia	1:13.24	2:27.74	+0.93
4	Danko Marinelli	Croatia	1:13.41	2:28.63	+1.82
5	Jaroslav Babušiak	Slovakia	1:13.70	2:28.78	+1.97
6	Stefan Georgiev	Bulgaria	1:13.58	2:29.03	+2.22
7	Natko Zrnčić-Dim	Croatia	1:13.65	2:29.16	+2.35
8	Christophe Roux	Moldova	1:14.26	2:29.20	+2.39
9	Roger Vidosa	Andorra	1:14.84	2:29.21	+2.40
10	Stephan Keppler	Germany	1:14.41	2:29.22	+2.41
11	Guillem Capdevila	Spain	1:14.38	2:29.48	+2.67
12	Aleksandr Khoroshilov	Russia	1:14.82	2:29.73	+2.92
13	Ivan Heimschild	Slovakia	1:15.27	2:29.76	+2.95
13	Maui Gayme	Chile	1:15.07	2:29.76	+2.95
15	Anton Konovalov	Russia	1:14.02	2:29.79	+2.98
16	Alexey Chaadayev	Russia	1:13.89	2:29.80	+2.99
17	Konstantin Sats	Russia	1:13.54	2:29.94	+3.13
18	Vassilis Dimitriadis	Greece	1:15.77	2:30.26	+3.45
19	Ferrán Terra	Spain	1:15.45	2:30.36	+3.55
20	Demian Franzen	Australia	1:14.16	2:30.64	+3.83
21	Bryce Stevens	Australia	1:15.51	2:30.86	+4.05
22	Benjamin Griffin	New Zealand	1:15.19	2:30.89	+4.08
23	Hugh Stevens	Australia	1:15.15	2:31.22	+4.41
24	Sascha Gritsch	Moldova	1:15.87	2:32.17	+5.36
25	Peter Lubellan	Slovakia	1:15.11	2:32.43	+5.62
26	Gísli Rafn Guðmundsson	Iceland	1:16.29	2:32.53	+5.72
27	Johnatan Longhi	Brazil	1:15.69	2:33.00	+6.19
28	Iason Abramashvili	Georgia	1:16.92	2:33.48	+6.67
29	Ioan-Gabriel Nan	Romania	1:17.42	2:34.12	+7.31
30	Želimir Vuković	Serbia	1:16.46	2:34.24	+7.43
31	Dean Todorov	Bulgaria	1:17.18	2:34.44	+7.63
32	Scott Gange	New Zealand	1:17.74	2:35.83	+9.02
33	Aleksandar Vitanov	Macedonia	1:17.75	2:36.25	+9.44
34	Kai Alaerts	Belgium	1:17.96	2:36.34	+9.53
35	Thomas Foley	Ireland	1:18.82	2:39.21	+12.40
36	Nicolae Barbu Bogdan	Romania	1:18.71	2:39.47	+12.66
37	Einārs Lansmanis	Latvia	1:20.20	2:40.31	+13.50
38	Attila Marosi	Hungary	1:20.58	2:41.41	+14.60
39	Sung-Hyun Kyung	South Korea	1:21.19	2:41.91	+15.10
40	Vitalij Rumiancev	Lithuania	1:20.61	2:42.19	+15.38
41	Kaspars Daugulis	Latvia	1:20.45	2:42.83	+16.02
42	Metodija Mitrevski	Macedonia	1:21.67	2:44.78	+17.97
43	Myhaylo Rusynyak	Ukraine	1:21.74	2:44.95	+18.14
44	Antonio Ristevski	Macedonia	1:23.39	2:45.29	+18.48
45	Hamit Şare	Turkey	1:21.56	2:45.98	+19.17
46	Deyvid Oprja	Estonia	1:21.07	2:46.42	+19.61
47	Bojan Kosić	Montenegro	1:23.45	2:47.00	+20.19
48	Marino Cardelli	San Marino	1:23.96	2:47.41	+20.60
49	Dardan Dehari	Macedonia	1:23.92	2:48.05	+21.24
50	Alexander Trelevski	Kyrgyzstan	1:23.61	2:49.56	+22.75
51	Li Guangxu	China	1:25.98	2:51.10	+24.29
52	Alex Jægersen	Denmark	1:24.94	2:51.80	+24.99
53	Shane O'Connor	Ireland	1:24.98	2:51.82	+25.01
54	Peter Byrne	Ireland	1:26.46	2:52.52	+25.71
55	Dmitry Trelevski	Kyrgyzstan	1:26.37	2:53.85	+27.04
56	Ivan Borisov	Kyrgyzstan	1:27.98	2:55.24	+28.43
57	Bob Biver	Luxembourg	1:26.73	2:55.33	+28.52
58	Emre Şimşek	Turkey	1:27.81	2:56.59	+29.78
59	Lei Li	China	1:29.60	2:58.57	+31.76
60	Gian Luca Giordani	San Marino	1:31.99	2:59.84	+33.03
61	Arsen Nersisyan	Armenia	1:30.95	3:00.41	+33.60
62	Abraham Sarkakhyan	Armenia	1:30.25	3:02.05	+35.24
63	Andrius Grigaras	Lithuania	1:31.06	3:03.18	+36.37
64	Tomas Endriukaitis	Lithuania	1:34.71	3:07.38	+40.57
65	Arsen Poghosyan	Armenia	1:35.15	3:08.63	+41.82
66	Kwame Nkrumah-Acheampong	Ghana	1:47.19	3:44.00	+1:17.19
—	Jorge Mandrú	Chile	1:14.54	DNF	—
—	Þorsteinn Ingason	Iceland	1:15.84	DNF	—
—	Nikolai Hentsch	Brazil	1:16.34	DNF	—
—	Cristián Anguita	Chile	1:16.80	DNF	—
—	Dainis Krauja	Latvia	1:16.89	DNF	—
—	Pavlos Tripodakis	Greece	1:19.57	DNF	—
—	Slaven Badura	Bosnia and Herzegovina	1:21.44	DNF	—
—	Min Zheng	China	1:23.29	DNF	—
—	Erkan Yeşilova	Turkey	1:24.39	DNF	—
—	Jeroen van den Bogaert	Belgium	DNF	—	—
—	Andrew Greig	New Zealand	DNF	—	—
—	Naoki Yuasa	Japan	DNF	—	—
—	Paul de la Cuesta	Spain	DNF	—	—
—	Mašan Miličić	Serbia	DNF	—	—
—	Bart Mollin	Belgium	DNF	—	—
—	Frederik van Buynder	Belgium	DNF	—	—
—	Roberts Rode	Latvia	DNF	—	—
—	Stefano Speck	Luxembourg	DNF	—	—
—	Tamás Ács	Hungary	DNF	—	—
—	Georges Salameh	Lebanon	DNF	—	—
—	Bence Szabó	Hungary	DNF	—	—
—	Philippe Araman	Lebanon	DNF	—	—
—	Nugzar Kiknadze	Georgia	DNF	—	—
—	Igor Vakhnenko	Ukraine	DNF	—	—
—	Vakhtang Tediashvili	Georgia	DNF	—	—
—	Mathias Valentin	Denmark	DNF	—	—
—	Christophe Papamichalopoulos	Cyprus	DNF	—	—
—	Frederik Moesgaard	Denmark	DNF	—	—
—	Mathias Brodersen	Denmark	DNF	—	—
—	Mark Bridgwater	New Zealand	DNS	—	—
—	Erdinç Türksever	Turkey	DNS	—	—
—	Arman Harutyunyan	Armenia	DNS	—	—
—	Ivica Kostelić	Croatia	DQ	—	—
—	Andrey Trelevski	Kyrgyzstan	DQ	—	—
