= FIS Alpine World Ski Championships 2007 – Men's slalom qualification =

Event: slalom qualification men

Date: 15 February 2007

1st run start time: 10:00 CET

2nd run start time: 13:30 CET

== Information ==
This is the first time that the qualification race was organized at the World Championships due to the large number of participants. Top 50 athletes in the World Cup rankings qualified directly into the final. Other athletes competed in the qualification race where top 25 will qualify into the final.

== Results ==
Rank	Athlete	Nation	1st run	2nd run	Behind
1	Tuukka Kaukoniemi	Finland	56.06	1:57.14	0
2	Natko Zrnčić-Dim	Croatia	56.82	1:58.16	+1.02
3	Anton Konovalov	Russia	57.84	1:58.56	+1.42
4	Kryštof Krýzl	Czech Republic	57.19	1:58.87	+1.73
5	Tim Jitloff	United States	58.88	1:59.31	+2.17
6	Jaroslav Babusiak	Slovakia	57.38	1:59.41	+2.27
7	Roger Vidosa	Andorra	58.11	1:59.70	+2.56
8	Dean Todorov	Bulgaria	58.53	1:59.75	+2.61
9	Cristian Javier Simari Birkner	Argentina	57.74	1:59.79	+2.65
10	Guillem Capdevila	Spain	57.32	1:59.80	+2.66
11	Bjoergvin Bjoergvinsson	Iceland	57.25	1:59.92	+2.78
12	Demian Franzen	Australia	57.56	2:00.13	+2.99
13	Kai Alaerts	Belgium	57.84	2:00.44	+3.30
14	Stepan Zuev	Russia	57.44	2:00.79	+3.65
15	Ivan Heimschild	Slovakia	58.36	2:00.97	+3.83
16	Jeroen van den Bogaert	Belgium	58.85	2:01.13	+3.99
17	Zelimir Vukovic	Serbia	58.15	2:01.15	+4.01
18	Bart Mollin	Belgium	58.40	2:01.41	+4.27
19	Petar Lubellan	Slovakia	59.87	2:01.84	+4.70
20	Christophe Roux	Moldova	59.72	2:02.06	+4.92
21	Wojciech Zagorski	Poland	59.80	2:02.26	+5.12
22	Hugh Stevens	Australia	59.39	2:02.70	+5.56
23	Benjamin Griffin	New Zealand	1:00.14	2:03.22	+6.08
24	Bryce Stevens	Australia	59.81	2:03.30	+6.16
25	Dalibor Samsal	Croatia	55.47	2:03.88	+6.74
26	Ioan-Gabriel Nan	Romania	59.83	2:03.96	+6.82
27	Stefano Speck	Luxembourg	1:00.57	2:04.53	+7.39
28	Mikail Renzhin	Israel	1:01.65	2:05.60	+8.46
29	Aleksandar Vitanov	Macedonia	1:01.45	2:05.65	+8.51
30	Nicolae Barbu Bogdan	Romania	1:01.37	2:06.77	+9.63
31	Gisli Rafn Gudmundsson	Iceland	1:02.56	2:08.47	+11.33
32	Vitalij Rumiancev	Lithuania	1:02.39	2:08.80	+11.66
33	Bence Szabó	Hungary	1:05.74	2:14.57	+17.43
34	Igor Vakhnenko	Ukraine	1:05.16	2:14.75	+17.61
35	Nugzar Kiknadze	Georgia	1:05.38	2:15.05	+17.91
36	Alex Jaegersen	Denmark	1:05.79	2:16.32	+19.18
37	Dainis Krauja	Latvia	1:03.60	2:16.49	+19.35
38	Erkan Yesilova	Turkey	1:07.88	2:19.42	+22.28
39	Georges Salameh	Lebanon	1:08.70	2:22.65	+25.51
39	Alexander Trelevski	Kyrgyzstan	1:13.79	2:22.65	+25.51
41	Yuheng Tian	China	1:09.65	2:23.78	+26.64
42	Min Zheng	China	1:09.73	2:23.94	+26.80
43	Christophe Papamichalopoulos	Cyprus	1:11.28	2:26.76	+29.62
44	Erdinc Turksever	Turkey	1:09.05	2:27.94	+30.80
45	Hamit Sare	Turkey	1:14.24	2:31.10	+33.96
46	Shane O'Connor	Ireland	1:06.99	2:35.32	+38.18
47	Peter Byrne	Ireland	1:21.05	2:39.94	+42.80
—	Stefan Georgiev	Bulgaria	56.97	DNF	—
—	Alexey Chaadayev	Russia	59.08	DNF	—
—	Frederik van Buynder	Belgium	1:02.08	DNF	—
—	Tamás Ács	Hungary	1:03.48	DNF	—
—	Marcus Sandell	Finland	1:04.70	DNF	—
—	Slaven Badura	Bosnia and Herzegovina	1:05.17	DNF	—
—	Bob Biver	Luxembourg	1:10.67	DNF	—
—	Myhaylo Rusynyak	Ukraine	1:11.20	DNF	—
—	Mathias Valentin	Denmark	1:11.32	DNF	—
—	Arsen Nersisyan	Armenia	1:13.59	DNF	—
—	Emre Simsek	Turkey	1:26.73	DNF	—
—	Scott Gange	New Zealand	1:00.56	DNS	—
—	Einars Lansmanis	Latvia	1:03.70	DQ	—
—	Danko Marinelli	Croatia	1:17.39	DQ	—
—	Aleksandr Khoroshilov	Russia	DQ	—	—
—	Iason Abramashvili	Georgia	DQ	—	—
—	Johnatan Longhi	Brazil	DQ	—	—
—	Dardan Dehari	Macedonia	DQ	—	—
—	Abraham Sarkakhyan	Armenia	DQ	—	—
—	Frederik Moesgaard	Denmark	DQ	—	—
—	Dmitry Trelevski	Kyrgyzstan	DQ	—	—
—	Deyvid Orpja	Estonia	DQ	—	—
—	Tomas Endriukaitis	Lithuania	DQ	—	—
—	Mikhail Berezin	Kyrgyzstan	DQ	—	—
