= FIS Alpine World Ski Championships 2011 – Men's slalom =

Complete results for Men's Slalom competition at the 2011 World Championships, run on Sunday, February 20. The 11th race of the championships, its first run was at 10:00 local time (CET) and the second run at 13:30. A total of 100 athletes from 55 countries competed in the final.

== Results ==
Rank	Bib	Name	Nation	Run 1	Rank	Run 2	Rank	Total	Difference
1st place, gold medalist(s)	2	Jean-Baptiste Grange	France	51.30	1	50.42	10	1:41.72	
2nd place, silver medalist(s)	18	Jens Byggmark	Sweden	52.39	6	49.76	4	1:42.15	+0.43
3rd place, bronze medalist(s)	1	Manfred Mölgg	Italy	51.52	2	50.81	17	1:42.33	+0.61
4	14	Mario Matt	Austria	53.11	15	49.43	1	1:42.54	+0.82
5	8	Julien Cousineau	Canada	52.95	13	49.64	2	1:42.59	+0.87
6	25	Naoki Yuasa	Japan	52.60	9	50.08	9	1:42.68	+0.96
7	16	Cristian Deville	Italy	53.11	15	49.67	3	1:42.78	+1.06
8	6	Ivica Kostelic	Croatia	52.32	5	50.56	11	1:42.88	+1.16
9	11	Manfred Pranger	Austria	52.41	7	50.62	15	1:43.03	+1.31
10	5	Andre Myhrer	Sweden	51.87	3	51.35	21	1:43.22	+1.50
11	10	Axel Bäck	Sweden	52.59	8	50.90	19	1:43.49	+1.77
12	3	Mattias Hargin	Sweden	52.27	4	51.32	20	1:43.59	+1.87
13	20	Mitja Valencic	Slovenia	53.03	14	50.60	13	1:43.63	+1.91
14	22	Urs Imboden	Moldova	53.75	23	50.03	7	1:43.78	+2.06
15	29	Nolan Kasper	United States	53.16	17	50.67	16	1:43.83	+2.11
16	28	Filip Trejbal	Czech Republic	54.04	27	49.80	6	1:43.84	+2.12
17	39	Alexis Pinturault	France	54.13	29	49.78	5	1:43.91	+2.19
18	33	Christoph Dreier	Austria	53.95	26	50.07	8	1:44.02	+2.30
19	17	Ted Ligety	United States	52.78	12	51.39	22	1:44.17	+2.45
20	26	Trevor White	Canada	53.84	25	50.58	12	1:44.42	+2.70
21	43	Fritz Dopfer	Germany	53.63	21	50.88	18	1:44.51	+2.79
22	37	Stefano Gross	Italy	54.33	32	50.60	13	1:44.93	+3.21
23	23	Lars Elton Myhre	Norway	53.55	20	52.02	25	1:45.57	+3.85
24	51	Adam Žampa	Slovakia	54.08	28	51.56	23	1:45.64	+3.92
25	30	Justin Murisier	Switzerland	55.49	37	51.79	24	1:47.28	+5.56
26	34	Kilian Albrecht	Bulgaria	55.12	35	52.52	26	1:47.64	+5.92
27	41	Markus Vogel	Switzerland	54.15	30	53.60	29	1:47.75	+6.03
28	53	Ryonosuke Ohkoshi	Japan	55.50	38	53.13	27	1:48.63	+6.91
29	56	Cristian Javier Simari Birkner	Argentina	55.53	31	53.85	31	1:49.38	+7.66
30	75	Filip Zubcic	Croatia	57.22	43	53.26	28	1:50.48	+8.76
31	59	Nikola Chongarov	Bulgaria	57.39	44	53.61	30	1:51.00	+9.28
32	72	Roger Vidosa	Andorra	57.10	42	54.03	32	1:51.13	+9.41
33	62	Jeroen Van Den Bogaert	Belgium	57.04	41	54.97	34	1:52.01	+10.29
34	70	Olivier Jenot	Monaco	58.53	46	54.58	33	1:53.11	+11.39
35	63	Mike Rishworth	Australia	58.62	47	55.13	35	1:53.75	+12.03
36	79	Kristaps Zvejnieks	Latvia	59.31	48	56.81	36	1:56.12	+14.40
37	19	Marc Gini	Switzerland	55.50	38	1:01.24	44	1:56.74	+15.02
38	21	Brad Spence	Canada	53.27	19	1:03.48	46	1:56.75	+15.03
39	44	Krystof Kryzl	Czech Republic	54.36	33	1:03.07	45	1:57.43	+15.71
40	81	Nikos Bonou	Greece	1:00.35	49	58.62	38	1:58.97	+17.25
41	92	Christian Vial	Denmark	1:01.65	52	58.41	37	2:00.06	+18.34
42	89	Jhonatan Longhi	Brazil	1:01.11	50	59.13	39	2:00.24	+18.52
43	87	Bojan Kosic	Montenegro	1:01.83	53	1:00.99	43	2:02.82	+21.10
44	91	Bertold Szepesi	Hungary	1:03.11	54	59.92	41	2:03.03	+21.31
45	94	Vitalij Rumiancev	Lithuania	1:03.93	55	59.13	39	2:03.06	+21.34
46	90	Igor Vakhnenko	Ukraine	1:04.04	56	1:00.16	42	2:04.20	+22.48
47	83	Marko Rudic	Bosnia and Herzegovina	1:01.35	51	1:13.70	48	2:15.05	+33.33
48	93	Erdinc Turksever	Turkey	1:05.42	57	1:10.14	47	2:15.56	+33.84
	4	Reinfried Herbst	Austria	52.65	10	DNF			
	12	Giuliano Razzoli	Italy	52.77	11	DNF			
	40	Wolfgang Hoerl	Austria	53.17	18	DNF			
	13	Felix Neureuther	Germany	53.65	22	DNF			
	36	Matic Skube	Slovenia	53.77	24	DNF			
	27	Akira Sasaki	Japan	54.18	31	DNF			
	32	David Chodounsky	United States	54.57	34	DNF			
	46	Leif Kristian Haugen	Norway	55.43	36	DNF			
	49	Victor Malmstrom	Finland	58.35	45	DNF			
	99	Artem Voronov	Uzbekistan	1:09.78	58	DNF			
	7	Silvan Zurbriggen	Switzerland	DNF					
	9	Steve Missillier	France	DNF					
	15	Michael Janyk	Canada	DNF					
	24	Ondrej Bank	Czech Republic	DNF					
	31	Kjetil Jansrud	Norway	DNF					
	35	Will Brandenburg	United States	DNF					
	38	Kalle Palander	Finland	DNF					
	42	Maxime Tissot	France	DNF					
	45	Björgvin Björgvinsson	Iceland	DNF					
	47	Noel Baxter	United Kingdom	DNF					
	48	Martin Vrablik	Czech Republic	DNF					
	50	Natko Zrncic-Dim	Croatia	DNF					
	52	Aleksandr Khoroshilov	Russia	DNF					
	54	Kyung Sung-hyun	South Korea	DNF					
	55	David Ryding	United Kingdom	DNF					
	57	Marcus Sandell	Finland	DNF					
	58	Stepan Zuev	Russia	DNF					
	60	Georgi Georgiev	Bulgaria	DNF					
	61	Kai Alaerts	Belgium	DNF					
	64	Kim Woo-sung	South Korea	DNF					
	65	Joery Rooij Van	Netherlands	DNF					
	66	Stefan Luitz	Germany	DNF					
	67	Santeri Paloniemi	Finland	DNF					
	68	Pouria Saveh-Shemshaki	Iran	DNF					
	69	Jaroslav Babusiak	Slovakia	DNF					
	71	Sebastiano Gastaldi	Argentina	DNF					
	73	Maciej Bydlinski	Poland	DNF					
	74	Pol Carreras	Spain	DNF					
	76	Benjamin Griffin	New Zealand	DNF					
	77	Simon Heeb	Liechtenstein	DNF					
	78	Antonio Ristevski	Macedonia	DNF					
	80	Ioan-Gabriel Nan	Romania	DNF					
	82	Alex Beniaidze	Georgia	DNF					
	84	Martin Khuber	Kazakhstan	DNF					
	85	Patrick Brachner	Azerbaijan	DNF					
	86	Yuri Danilochkin	Belarus	DNF					
	88	Martin Anguita	Chile	DNF					
	95	Zhang Yuxin	China	DNF					
	96	Constantinos Papamichael	Cyprus	DNF					
	97	Alexander Heath	South Africa	DNF					
	100	Arsen Nersisyan	Armenia	DNF					
	98	Virgile Vandeput	Israel	DSQ					
