= FIS Alpine World Ski Championships 2007 – Men's slalom =

Event: slalom men

Date: 17 February 2007

1st run start time: 10:00 CET

2nd run start time: 13:00 CET

== Results ==
Rank	Athlete	Nation	1st run	2nd run	Behind
1	Mario Matt	Austria	59.22	1:57.33	0
2	Manfred Mölgg	Italy	1:00.55	1:59.14	+1.81
3	Jean-Baptiste Grange	France	1:00.49	1:59.54	+2.21
4	Benjamin Raich	Austria	1:00.45	1:59.57	+2.24
5	Manfred Pranger	Austria	1:00.41	1:59.82	+2.49
6	Michael Janyk	Canada	1:00.70	1:59.98	+2.65
7	Truls Ove Karlsen	Norway	1:01.31	2:00.20	+2.87
8	Hans Petter Buraas	Norway	1:01.43	2:00.78	+3.45
9	Patrick Biggs	Canada	1:01.48	2:01.44	+4.11
10	Lars Elton Myhre	Norway	1:01.74	2:01.56	+4.23
11	Urs Imboden	Moldova	1:02.27	2:01.78	+4.45
12	Martin Hansson	Sweden	1:01.79	2:01.98	+4.65
13	Kilian Albrecht	Bulgaria	1:02.29	2:02.28	+4.95
14	Julien Lizeroux	France	1:02.86	2:02.71	+5.38
15	Noel Baxter	United Kingdom	1:01.90	2:02.83	+5.50
16	Filip Trejbal	Czech Republic	1:01.85	2:03.23	+5.90
17	Cristian Javier Simari Birkner	Argentina	1:02.70	2:03.60	+6.27
18	Naoki Yuasa	Japan	1:01.53	2:04.47	+7.14
19	Demian Franzen	Australia	1:04.76	2:07.82	+10.49
20	Ivan Heimschild	Slovakia	1:05.00	2:09.15	+11.82
21	Dean Todorov	Bulgaria	1:06.63	2:09.61	+12.28
22	Andre Myhrer	Sweden	1:01.04	2:09.90	+12.57
23	Guillem Capdevila	Spain	1:06.55	2:10.53	+13.20
23	Kai Alaerts	Belgium	1:06.69	2:10.53	+13.20
25	Tim Jitloff	United States	1:03.35	2:23.26	+25.93
—	Felix Neureuther	Germany	1:00.36	DNF	—
—	Markus Larsson	Sweden	1:00.56	DNF	—
—	Ivica Kostelic	Croatia	1:00.74	DNF	—
—	Kalle Palander	Finland	1:00.78	DNF	—
—	Cristian Deville	Italy	1:01.61	DNF	—
—	Paul Stutz	Canada	1:02.04	DNF	—
—	Pierrick Bourgeat	France	1:02.25	DNF	—
—	Tuukka Kaukoniemi	Finland	1:02.33	DNF	—
—	Bernard Vajdic	Slovenia	1:02.41	DNF	—
—	Bjoergvin Bjoergvinsson	Iceland	1:04.02	DNF	—
—	Benjamin Griffin	New Zealand	1:05.74	DNF	—
—	Peter Lubellan	Slovakia	1:06.00	DNF	—
—	Giorgio Rocca	Italy	1:17.81	DNS	—
—	Jens Byggmark	Sweden	DNF	—	—
—	Ted Ligety	United States	DNF	—	—
—	Thomas Grandi	Canada	DNF	—	—
—	Reinfried Herbst	Austria	DNF	—	—
—	Marc Berthod	Switzerland	DNF	—	—
—	Akira Sasaki	Japan	DNF	—	—
—	Rainer Schoenfelder	Austria	DNF	—	—
—	Aksel Lund Svindal	Norway	DNF	—	—
—	Silvan Zurbriggen	Switzerland	DNF	—	—
—	Daniel Albrecht	Switzerland	DNF	—	—
—	Alois Vogl	Germany	DNF	—	—
—	Marc Gini	Switzerland	DNF	—	—
—	Jimmy Cochran	United States	DNF	—	—
—	Bode Miller	United States	DNF	—	—
—	Patrick Thaler	Italy	DNF	—	—
—	Mitja Valencic	Slovenia	DNF	—	—
—	Alexandre Anselmet	France	DNF	—	—
—	Ondřej Bank	Czech Republic	DNF	—	—
—	Jukka Leino	Finland	DNF	—	—
—	Alain Baxter	United Kingdom	DNF	—	—
—	Ales Gorza	Slovenia	DNF	—	—
—	Dalibor Samsal	Croatia	DNF	—	—
—	Kryštof Krýzl	Czech Republic	DNF	—	—
—	Jeroen van den Bogaert	Belgium	DNF	—	—
—	Christophe Roux	Moldova	DNF	—	—
—	Bart Mollin	Belgium	DNF	—	—
—	Zelimir Vukovic	Serbia	DNF	—	—
—	Jaroslav Babušiak	Slovakia	DNF	—	—
—	Stepan Zuev	Russia	DNF	—	—
—	Bryce Stevens	Australia	DNF	—	—
—	Anton Konovalov	Russia	DNF	—	—
—	Wojciech Zagórski	Poland	DNF	—	—
—	Roger Vidosa	Andorra	DNF	—	—
—	Hugh Stevens	Australia	DNF	—	—
—	Mitja Dragsic	Slovenia	DQ	—	—
—	Martin Vráblík	Czech Republic	DQ	—	—
