= Alpine skiing at the 2006 Winter Olympics – Men's slalom =

Men's slalom at the XX Olympic Winter Games
- Pictogram for alpine skiing
- Venue: Sestriere
- Date: February 25, 2006
- Competitors: 97 from 49 nations
- Winning time: 1:43.14

Medalists
1st place, gold medalist(s)		Benjamin Raich	Austria
2nd place, silver medalist(s)		Reinfried Herbst	Austria
3rd place, bronze medalist(s)		Rainer Schönfelder	Austria

The slalom competition is shorter than the giant slalom, but is otherwise similar in emphasizing maneuverability. Slalom has been a part of all the Winter Olympics since 1936, although it was a part of the alpine combination that year. Only the downhill event has a longer history at the Winter Olympics. The men's slalom took place on 25 February and was the last of the Olympic alpine skiing competitions.

Jean-Pierre Vidal of France was the defending Olympic champion, but he hadn't won a World Cup slalom event since the 2001–02 season. Nevertheless, Vidal was fourth in the slalom World Cup, one place ahead of defending World Champion Benjamin Raich. The Italian Giorgio Rocca led the World Cup after winning all five races thus far in the season, 215 points ahead of the second-placed American Ted Ligety.

== Results ==
Complete results from the men's slalom event at the 2006 Winter Olympics.

Rank	Name	Country	Run 1	Run 2	Time	Difference
1st place, gold medalist(s)	Benjamin Raich	Austria	53.37	49.77	1:43.14	+0.00
2nd place, silver medalist(s)	Reinfried Herbst	Austria	53.55	50.42	1:43.97	+0.83
3rd place, bronze medalist(s)	Rainer Schönfelder	Austria	54.03	50.12	1:44.15	+1.01
4	Kentaro Minagawa	Japan	53.44	50.74	1:44.18	+1.04
4	Andre Myhrer	Sweden	53.95	50.23	1:44.18	+1.04
6	Ivica Kostelić	Croatia	54.43	50.02	1:44.45	+1.31
7	Naoki Yuasa	Japan	54.76	49.81	1:44.57	+1.43
8	Johan Brolenius	Sweden	54.37	50.44	1:44.81	+1.67
9	Thomas Grandi	Canada	53.64	51.20	1:44.84	+1.70
10	Martin Hansson	Sweden	54.50	50.74	1:45.24	+2.10
11	Pierrick Bourgeat	France	54.45	51.03	1:45.48	+2.34
12	Jimmy Cochran	United States	54.49	51.19	1:45.68	+2.54
13	Drago Grubelnik	Slovenia	54.87	50.82	1:45.69	+2.55
14	Marc Berthod	Switzerland	56.22	49.78	1:46.00	+2.86
15	Silvan Zurbriggen	Switzerland	55.17	50.93	1:46.10	+2.96
16	Alain Baxter	Great Britain	54.93	51.22	1:46.15	+3.01
17	Michael Janyk	Canada	55.32	50.87	1:46.19	+3.05
18	Chip Knight	United States	54.71	51.55	1:46.26	+3.12
19	Bernard Vajdič	Slovenia	55.16	51.27	1:46.43	+3.29
20	Noel Baxter	Great Britain	56.07	51.15	1:47.22	+4.08
21	Martin Vráblík	Czech Republic	56.01	51.39	1:47.40	+4.26
22	Björgvin Björgvinsson	Iceland	57.07	54.16	1:51.23	+8.09
23	Vassilis Dimitriadis	Greece	57.38	54.00	1:51.38	+8.24
24	Jaroslav Babušiak	Slovakia	58.51	53.55	1:52.06	+8.92
25	Stefan Georgiev	Bulgaria	58.30	54.25	1:52.55	+9.41
26	Ivan Heimschild	Slovakia	59.67	54.31	1:53.98	+10.84
27	Roger Vidosa	Andorra	59.87	54.16	1:54.03	+10.89
28	Kristján Uni Óskarsson	Iceland	58.92	55.78	1:54.70	+11.56
29	Anton Konovalov	Russia	59.53	55.18	1:54.71	+11.57
30	Marco Schafferer	Bosnia and Herzegovina	1:01.11	56.06	1:57.17	+14.03
31	Mickey Ross	New Zealand	1:03.30	54.50	1:57.80	+14.66
32	Iason Abramashvili	Georgia	1:01.84	56.83	1:58.67	+15.53
33	Natko Zrnčić-Dim	Croatia	57.69	1:01.34	1:59.03	+15.89
34	Olivier Jenot	Monaco	1:03.85	55.28	1:59.13	+15.99
35	Kristinn Ingi Valsson	Iceland	1:03.27	56.53	1:59.80	+16.66
36	Nikolay Skriabin	Ukraine	1:01.98	57.98	1:59.96	+16.82
37	Mikail Renzhin	Israel	1:01.83	58.90	2:00.73	+17.59
38	Theodoros Christodoulou	Cyprus	1:05.58	1:00.97	2:06.55	+23.41
39	Hannes Paul Schmid	Italy	55.26	1:13.37	2:08.63	+25.49
40	Hamit Şare	Turkey	1:07.57	1:01.56	2:09.13	+25.99
41	Alidad Saveh-Shemshaki	Iran	1:07.57	1:01.99	2:09.56	+26.42
42	Attila Marosi	Hungary	1:07.67	1:02.61	2:10.28	+27.14
43	George Salameh	Lebanon	1:07.62	1:03.99	2:11.61	+28.47
44	Vitalij Rumiancev	Lithuania	1:09.19	1:04.27	2:13.46	+30.32
45	Abraham Sarkakhyan	Armenia	1:10.69	1:05.52	2:16.21	+33.07
46	Kayrat Ermetov	Uzbekistan	1:13.19	1:07.69	2:20.88	+37.74
47	Yasuhiro Ikuta	Japan	1:15.19	1:08.09	2:23.28	+40.14
	Akira Sasaki	Japan	54.37	DNF		
	Aksel Lund Svindal	Norway	54.97	DNF		
	Daniel Albrecht	Switzerland	55.33	DNF		
	Felix Neureuther	Germany	55.16	DNF		
	Patrick Biggs	Canada	54.38	DNF		
	Jean-Baptiste Grange	France	54.84	DNF		
	Filip Trejbal	Czech Republic	54.75	DNF		
	Michał Kałwa	Poland	59.82	DNF		
	Deyan Todorov	Bulgaria	1:00.69	DNF		
	Gjorgi Markovski	Macedonia	1:04.03	DNF		
	Li Guangxu	China	1:08.84	DNF		
	Kalle Palander	Finland	53.38	DSQ		
	Kang Min Heuk	South Korea	58.53	DSQ		
	Želimir Vuković	Serbia and Montenegro	1:00.51	DSQ		
	Ivan Borisov	Kyrgyzstan	1:09.54	DSQ		
	Jean-Pierre Vidal	France	DNS			
	Ondřej Bank	Czech Republic	DNS			
	Pavel Chestakov	Russia	DNS			
	Deyvid Oprja	Estonia	DNS			
	Giorgio Rocca	Italy	DNF			
	Markus Larsson	Sweden	DNF			
	Alois Vogl	Germany	DNF			
	Stéphane Tissot	France	DNF			
	Bode Miller	United States	DNF			
	Mario Matt	Austria	DNF			
	Manfred Mölgg	Italy	DNF			
	Patrick Thaler	Italy	DNF			
	Hans-Petter Buraas	Norway	DNF			
	Jean-Philippe Roy	Canada	DNF			
	Lars Elton Myhre	Norway	DNF			
	Jono Brauer	Australia	DNF			
	Mitja Valenčič	Slovenia	DNF			
	James Leuzinger	Great Britain	DNF			
	Cristian Javier Simari Birkner	Argentina	DNF			
	Aleš Gorza	Slovenia	DNF			
	Jukka Rajala	Finland	DNF			
	Dmitrij Ulianov	Russia	DNF			
	Dalibor Šamšal	Croatia	DNF			
	Kryštof Krýzl	Czech Republic	DNF			
	Mikhail Sedyankov	Bulgaria	DNF			
	Aleksandr Khoroshilov	Russia	DNF			
	Alex Antor	Andorra	DNF			
	Danko Marinelli	Croatia	DNF			
	Sindri M. Pálsson	Iceland	DNF			
	Alexander Heath	South Africa	DNF			
	Victor Ryabchenko	Kazakhstan	DNF			
	Leyti Seck	Senegal	DNF			
	Mathieu Razanakolona	Madagascar	DNF			
	Erjon Tola	Albania	DNF			
	Ted Ligety	United States	DSQ			
