= FIS Alpine World Ski Championships 2013 – Men's slalom =

Men's slalom at the FIS Alpine World Ski Championships 2013
- Venue: Planai; Schladming, Austria
- Date: 17 February 2013
- Competitors: 100 from 57 nations
- Winning time: 1:51.03

Medalists
gold medal	Marcel Hirscher	Austria
silver medal	Felix Neureuther	Germany
bronze medal	Mario Matt	Austria

Complete results for Men's Slalom competition at the 2013 World Championships. It ran on February 17 at 10:00 local time (1st run) and 13:30 local time (2nd run), the last race of the championships. 100 athletes from 57 nations competed while 139 athletes from 59 countries competed in the qualification race on February 16.

== Results ==
=== Race ===
The first run was started at 10:00 and the second run at 13:30.

Rank	Bib	Name	Nation	Run 1	Rank	Run 2	Rank	Total	Difference
1st place, gold medalist(s)	2	Marcel Hirscher	Austria	55.56	1	55.47	4	1:51.03	
2nd place, silver medalist(s)	3	Felix Neureuther	Germany	55.84	2	55.61	8	1:51.45	+0.42
3rd place, bronze medalist(s)	1	Mario Matt	Austria	56.12	3	55.56	6	1:51.68	+0.65
4	5	Andre Myhrer	Sweden	56.34	7	55.74	12	1:52.08	+1.05
5	6	Ivica Kostelić	Croatia	56.56	9	55.59	7	1:52.15	+1.12
6	15	Alexis Pinturault	France	56.56	9	55.71	11	1:52.27	+1.24
7	4	Fritz Dopfer	Germany	56.22	5	56.30	23	1:52.52	+1.49
8	9	Jens Byggmark	Sweden	56.99	12	55.86	15	1:52.85	+1.82
9	11	Mattias Hargin	Sweden	56.94	11	56.02	19	1:52.96	+1.93
10	20	Mitja Valenčič	Slovenia	57.75	17	55.45	3	1:53.20	+2.17
11	14	Stefano Gross	Italy	57.72	16	55.62	9	1:53.34	+2.31
12	23	Jean-Baptiste Grange	France	57.36	14	56.10	21	1:53.46	+2.43
13	12	Benjamin Raich	Austria	56.55	8	57.07	24	1:53.62	+2.59
14	24	Michael Janyk	Canada	58.05	18	55.76	13	1:53.81	+2.67
15	36	Adam Žampa	Slovakia	58.64	24	55.25	1	1:53.89	+2.86
16	34	Santeri Paloniemi	Finland	58.33	21	55.70	10	1:54.03	+3.00
17	21	Markus Vogel	Switzerland	58.15	20	55.91	16	1:54.06	+3.03
18	28	Marc Gini	Switzerland	58.65	25	55.49	5	1:54.14	+3.11
19	38	Akira Sasaki	Japan	58.98	26	55.38	2	1:54.36	+3.33
20	27	Kryštof Krýzl	Czech Republic	58.56	22	55.98	20	1:54.54	+3.51
21	33	Stefan Luitz	Germany	58.62	23	56.04	18	1:54.66	+3.63
22	30	Steven Theolier	France	59.44	28	55.79	14	1:55.23	+4.20
23	29	Leif Kristian Haugen	Norway	59.59	30	55.95	17	1:55.54	+4.51
24	52	Patrick Jazbec	Slovenia	59.57	29	56.18	22	1:55.75	+4.72
25	46	Matic Skube	Slovenia	59.90	31	57.55	25	1:57.45	+6.42
26	35	Victor Muffat Jeandet	France	1:00.33	34	57.68	26	1:58.01	+6.98
27	44	Dalibor Šamšal	Croatia	1:00.01	32	59.63	29	1:58.64	+7.61
28	45	Reto Schmidiger	Switzerland	1:00.83	38	58.08	27	1:58.91	+7.88
29	42	Filip Trejbal	Czech Republic	1:00.51	35	58.44	28	1:58.95	+7.92
30	54	Cristian Javier Simari Birkner	Argentina	1:00.81	37	59.54	33	2:00.35	+9.32
31	62	Stefan Prisadov	Belgium	1:01.48	40	59.03	30	2:00.51	+9.48
32	67	Iason Abramashvili	Georgia	1:01.52	41	59.29	31	2:00.81	+9.78
33	58	Matej Vidović	Croatia	1:02.33	44	59.34	32	2:01.67	+10.64
34	63	Marco Pfiffner	Liechtenstein	1:01.66	42	1:00.93	34	2:02.59	+11.56
35	32	Trevor Philp	Canada	1:04.43	47	1:00.93	34	2:05.36	+14.33
36	74	Warren Cummings Smith	Estonia	1:04.08	46	1:01.55	36	2:05.63	+14.60
37	71	Patrick Brachner	Azerbaijan	1:04.85	48	1:02.06	37	2:06.91	+15.88
38	93	Yuri Danilochkin	Belarus	1:06.49	50	1:03.12	38	2:09.61	+18.58
39	73	Brynjar-Jökull Gudmundsson	Iceland	1:07.51	52	1:05.27	39	2:12.78	+21.75
40	82	Nikos Bonou	Greece	1:08.58	53	1:06.86	40	2:15.44	+24.41
41	95	Park Hy-Un	South Korea	1:10.53	54	1:07.35	41	2:17.88	+26.85
42	87	Erjon Tola	Albania	1:12.31	55	1:09.32	43	2:21.63	+30.60
43	98	Artem Voronov	Uzbekistan	1:14.48	59	1:08.45	42	2:22.93	+31.90
44	94	Geoffrey Osch	Luxembourg	1:12.32	56	1:11.32	44	2:23.64	+32.61
45	86	Constantinos Papamichael	Cyprus	1:14.53	58	1:11.79	45	2:26.32	+35.29
46	96	Tarek Fenianos	Lebanon	1:16.00	60	1:13.42	46	2:29.42	+38.39
47	92	Csaba Bujtas	Hungary	1:13.55	57	1:16.10	47	2:29.65	+38.62
	7	Manfred Mölgg	Italy	56.21	4	DNF			
	13	Manfred Pranger	Austria	56.27	6	DNF			
	18	Markus Larsson	Sweden	57.33	13	DNF			
	17	Steve Missillier	France	57.47	15	DNF			
	10	Patrick Thaler	Italy	58.09	19	DNF			
	22	Henrik Kristoffersen	Norway	59.40	27	DNF			
	43	David Ryding	Great Britain	1:00.21	33	DNF			
	47	Filip Zubčić	Croatia	1:00.67	36	DNF			
	56	Simon Heeb	Liechtenstein	1:01.14	39	DNF			
	72	Andreas Zampa	Slovakia	1:02.10	43	DNF			
	69	Maarten Meiners	Netherlands	1:03.57	45	DNF			
	80	Antonio Ristevski	Macedonia	1:05.29	49	DNF			
	76	Marko Vukićević	Serbia	1:07.41	51	DNF			
61	89	Virgile Vandeput	Israel	1:22.57	61				
	8	Giuliano Razzoli	Italy	DNF					
	16	Ted Ligety	United States	DNF					
	19	Naoki Yuasa	Japan	DNF					
	25	David Chodounsky	United States	DNF					
	26	Aleksandr Khoroshilov	Russia	DNF					
	31	Will Brandenburg	United States	DNF					
	37	Miha Kuerner	Slovenia	DNF					
	39	Ryunosuke Ohkoshi	Japan	DNF					
	40	Ramon Zenhäusern	Switzerland	DNF					
	41	Philipp Schmid	Germany	DNF					
	48	Bart Mollin	Belgium	DNF					
	49	Michal Jasiczek	Poland	DNF					
	50	Stepan Zuev	Russia	DNF					
	51	Sasha Zaitsoff	Canada	DNF					
	53	Victor Malmström	Finland	DNF					
	55	Kristaps Zvejnieks	Latvia	DNF					
	57	Ondřej Berndt	Czech Republic	DNF					
	59	Kai Alaerts	Belgium	DNF					
	60	Aleksander Andrienko	Russia	DNF					
	61	Mike Rishworth	Australia	DNF					
	64	Mohammad Darbandsari	Iran	DNF					
	65	Pol Carreras	Spain	DNF					
	66	Olivier Jenot	Monaco	DNF					
	68	Martin Anguita	Chile	DNF					
	70	Steffan Winkelhorst	Netherlands	DNF					
	75	Vladimír Siráň	Slovakia	DNF					
	77	Nil Ruiz Antuna	Andorra	DNF					
	78	Marko Rudić	Bosnia and Herzegovina	DNF					
	79	Adam Barwood	New Zealand	DNF					
	81	Alexandru Barbu	Romania	DNF					
	83	Christoffer Faarup	Denmark	DNF					
	84	Jaba Gelashvili	Georgia	DNF					
	85	Jhonatan Longhi	Brazil	DNF					
	88	Rostyslav Feshchuk	Ukraine	DNF					
	90	Mladen Minić	Montenegro	DNF					
	91	Li Lei	China	DNF					
	97	Manfred Oettl Reyes	Peru	DNF					
	100	Conor Lyne	Ireland	DNF					
	99	Arsen Nersisyan	Armenia	DNS					

=== Qualification ===
The first run was started at 10:00 and the second run at 13:30.

Rank	Bib	Name	Nation	Run 1	Rank	Run 2	Rank	Total	Difference
1	7	Victor Malmström	Finland	53.38	1	55.85	1	1:49.23	
2	26	Pol Carreras	Spain	54.26	2	57.01	4	1:51.27	+2.04
3	1	Cristian Javier Simari Birkner	Argentina	54.71	4	57.24	6	1:51.95	+2.72
4	9	Matej Vidović	Croatia	54.95	6	57.01	4	1:51.96	+2.73
5	28	Iason Abramashvili	Georgia	54.75	5	57.50	8	1:52.25	+3.02
6	4	Patrick Jazbec	Slovenia	54.44	3	58.08	14	1:52.52	+3.29
7	3	Sasha Zaitsoff	Canada	56.16	12	56.69	2	1:52.85	+3.62
8	20	Stefan Prisadov	Bulgaria	55.78	10	57.84	10	1:53.62	+4.39
9	48	Adam Barwood	New Zealand	56.32	13	57.60	9	1:53.92	+4.69
10	33	Andreas Zampa	Slovakia	56.72	15	57.37	7	1:54.09	+4.86
11	30	Maarten Meiners	Netherlands	57.60	20	56.96	3	1:54.56	+5.33
12	6	Ondřej Berndt	Czech Republic	56.48	14	58.78	22	1:55.26	+5.50
13	15	Kai Alaerts	Belgium	57.30	18	57.97	17	1:55.27	+6.03
14	5	Simon Heeb	Liechtenstein	55.40	8	59.33	13	1:54.73	+6.04
15	40	Vladimír Siráň	Slovakia	57.84	23	57.92	12	1:55.76	+6.64
16	27	Olivier Jenot	Monaco	57.11	17	59.04	19	1:56.15	+6.92
17	17	Mike Rishworth	Australia	57.00	16	59.17	21	1:56.17	+6.94
18	16	Aleksander Andrienko	Russia	57.63	21	58.62	16	1:56.25	+7.02
19	31	Steffan Winkelhorst	Netherlands	57.48	19	58.82	18	1:56.30	+7.07
20	38	Warren Smith	Estonia	59.10	29	58.09	15	1:57.19	+7.96
21	46	Marko Rudić	Bosnia and Herzegovina	58.27	26	59.49	24	1:57.76	+8.53
22	59	Jaba Gelashvili	Georgia	57.64	22	1:00.13	25	1:57.77	+8.54
23	23	Marco Pfiffner	Liechtenstein	58.89	28	59.08	20	1:57.97	+8.74
24	34	Brynjar-Jokull Gudmundsson	Iceland	58.88	27	59.42	23	1:58.30	+9.07
25	89	Yuri Danilochkin	Belarus	1:00.19	33	1:00.48	26	2:00.67	+11.44
26	35	Hossein Shemshaki	Iran	1:00.97	36	1:00.91	27	2:01.88	+12.65
27	55	Dardan Dehari	Macedonia	1:00.45	34	1:02.12	28	2:02.57	+13.34
28	61	Jhonatan Longhi	Brazil	1:00.94	35	1:02.31	29	2:03.25	+14.02
29	86	Christian Vial	Denmark	1:02.61	39	1:02.43	30	2:05.04	+15.81
30	81	Fabio Guglielmini	Brazil	1:02.81	40	1:04.18	31	2:06.99	+17.76
31	90	Tarik Hadžić	Montenegro	1:03.55	44	1:05.90	33	2:09.45	+20.22
32	92	Park Hy-Un	South Korea	1:07.18	46	1:05.02	32	2:12.20	+22.97
33	104	Dmitriy Babikov	Uzbekistan	1:09.79	48	1:10.45	35	2:20.24	+31.01
34	113	Michael Chaker	Lebanon	1:11.35	49	1:10.92	36	2:22.27	+33.04
35	95	Tarek Fenianos	Lebanon	1:14.90	51	1:12.73	37	2:27.63	+38.40
36	121	Hubertus von Hohenlohe	Mexico	1:11.77	50	1:17.26	40	2:29.03	+39.80
37	116	Dmitry Trelevski	Kyrgyzstan	1:20.70	55	1:09.82	34	2:30.52	+41.29
38	123	Safar Egemberdiev	Uzbekistan	1:15.71	53	1:15.04	38	2:30.75	+41.52
39	112	Arif Khan	India	1:15.69	52	1:15.30	39	2:30.99	+41.76
40	103	Dani Chamoun	Lebanon	1:16.86	54	1:18.02	42	2:34.88	+45.65
41	137	Anvar Junusov	Uzbekistan	1:20.79	56	1:17.70	41	2:38.49	+49.26
42	130	Himanshu Thakur	India	1:33.51	59	1:25.99	43	2:59.50	+1:10.27
43	138	Michael Elliott Williams	Jamaica	1:51.21	61	1:48.27	46	3:39.48	+1:50.25
44	136	Jean-Pierre Roy	Haiti	2:03.96	62	1:49.55	47	3:53.51	+2:04.28
45	135	Benoit Etoc	Haiti	2:08.34	63	1:54.20	48	4:02.54	+2:13.31
	25	Maciej Bydliński	Poland	55.39	7	DNF			
	11	Tomoya Ishii	Japan	55.47	9	DNF			
	19	Eemeli Pirinen	Finland	56.06	11	DNF			
	39	Jorge Birkner Ketelhohn	Argentina	57.90	24	DNF			
	22	Nikola Chongarov	Bulgaria	59.45	30	DNF			
	60	Martins Onskulis	Latvia	59.67	31	DNF			
	56	Porya Shemshaki	Iran	59.74	32	DNF			
	74	Ioannis Antoniou	Greece	1:01.32	37	DNF			
	96	Manfred Oettl Reyes	Peru	1:02.11	38	DNF			
	75	Nicolas Carvallo	Chile	1:02.98	41	DNF			
	78	Massimiliano Valcareggi	Greece	1:03.14	42	DNF			
	77	Vasyl Telychuk	Ukraine	1:03.21	43	DNF			
	91	Geoffrey Osch	Luxembourg	1:06.33	45	DNF			
	117	Viacheslau Yudzin	Belarus	1:08.69	47	DNF			
	100	Márton Bene	Hungary	1.21.23	57	DNF			
	41	Alex Beniaidze	Georgia	58.02	25	DQ			
	132	Joao-Miguel Marques	Portugal	1:21.24	58	DQ			
	139	Sunny Kumar	India	1:34.58	60	DQ			
	2	Kristaps Zvejnieks	Latvia	DNF					
	10	Luke Laidlaw	Australia	DNF					
	12	Philip Brown	Canada	DNF					
	13	Ross Peraudo	Australia	DNF					
	18	Sebastiano Gastaldi	Argentina	DNF					
	21	Mateusz Garniewicz	Poland	DNF					
	24	Mohammad Darbandsari	Iran	DNF					
	29	Martin Anguita	Chile	DNF					
	32	Patrick Brachner	Azerbaijan	DNF					
	36	Einar-Kristinn Kristgeirsson	Iceland	DNF					
	37	Igor Laikert	Bosnia and Herzegovina	DNF					
	42	Marko Vukićević	Serbia	DNF					
	43	Nil Ruiz Antuna	Andorra	DNF					
	44	Jeroen van den Bogaert	Belgium	DNF					
	45	Rodrigo Murtagh	Argentina	DNF					
	47	Sturla-Snaer Snorasson	Iceland	DNF					
	49	Antonio Ristevski	Macedonia	DNF					
	52	Alexander Hilzinger	Liechtenstein	DNF					
	53	Willis Feasey	New Zealand	DNF					
	54	Nikos Bonou	Greece	DNF					
	57	Christoffer Faarup	Denmark	DNF					
	58	Benjamin Carvallo	Chile	DNF					
	62	Constantinos Papamichael	Cyprus	DNF					
	63	Arnar-Geir Isaksson	Iceland	DNF					
	64	Nick Prebble	New Zealand	DNF					
	65	Seyed Morteza Jafari	Iran	DNF					
	66	Xan Alaerts	Belgium	DNF					
	67	Andrija Vuković	Serbia	DNF					
	69	Erjon Tola	Albania	DNF					
	70	Rostyslav Feshchuk	Ukraine	DNF					
	71	Haris Hodžić	Bosnia and Herzegovina	DNF					
	72	Kaspars Daugulis	Latvia	DNF					
	73	Henrik von Appen	Chile	DNF					
	76	Virgile Vandeput	Israel	DNF					
	79	Mladen Minić	Montenegro	DNF					
	80	Ivan Kovbasnyuk	Ukraine	DNF					
	82	Li Lei	China	DNF					
	83	Csaba Bujtas	Hungary	DNF					
	84	Zhang Yuxin	China	DNF					
	85	Mladen Pešić	Serbia	DNF					
	87	Bertold Szepesi	Hungary	DNF					
	88	Soso Japharidze	Georgia	DNF					
	93	Toms Sarkanis	Latvia	DNF					
	94	Huang Haibin	China	DNF					
	97	Artem Voronov	Uzbekistan	DNF					
	98	Arsen Nersisyan	Armenia	DNF					
	99	Alexandre Mohbat	Lebanon	DNF					
	101	Conor Lyne	Ireland	DNF					
	102	Marjan Nashoku	Macedonia	DNF					
	105	Márton Stark	Hungary	DNF					
	106	Alexander Heath	South Africa	DNF					
	107	Dinos Lefkaritis	Cyprus	DNF					
	108	Kim Yngland	Luxembourg	DNF					
	109	Karolis Janulionis	Lithuania	DNF					
	110	Aivaras Tumas	Lithuania	DNF					
	111	Arsen Ghazaryan	Armenia	DNF					
	114	Evgeniy Timofeev	Kyrgyzstan	DNF					
	115	Hubert Gallagher	Ireland	DNF					
	118	Vincenzo Romano Michelotti	San Marino	DNF					
	119	Lorenzo Bizzocchi	San Marino	DNF					
	120	Kristian-Lyhne Damgaard	Denmark	DNF					
	122	Frederic Ramsgaard Oerum	Denmark	DNF					
	124	Yura Manukyan	Armenia	DNF					
	125	Tsotane Dywili	South Africa	DNF					
	126	Ricardo Brancal	Portugal	DNF					
	127	Sive Speelman	South Africa	DNF					
	128	Davit Khachatryan	Armenia	DNF					
	129	Jedrij Notz	Azerbaijan	DNF					
	131	Andrey Trelevski	Kyrgyzstan	DNF					
	134	Wu Meng-che	Chinese Taipei	DNF					
	133	Ivan Borisov	Kyrgyzstan	DNF					
	14	Georgi Georgiev	Bulgaria	DQ					
	50	Alexandru Barbu	Romania	DQ					
	68	Kostas Sykaras	Greece	DQ					
	8	Matej Falat	Slovakia	DNS					
	51	Martin Khuber	Kazakhstan	DNS					
