= Alpine skiing at the 2010 Winter Olympics – Men's slalom =

Men's slalom at the XXI Olympic Winter Games
- alpine skiing
- Venue: Whistler Creekside; Whistler, British Columbia; Canada
- Date: February 27, 2010
- Competitors: 102 from 56 nations
- Winning time: 1:39.32

Medalists
1st place, gold medalist(s)		Giuliano Razzoli	Italy
2nd place, silver medalist(s)		Ivica Kostelić	Croatia
3rd place, bronze medalist(s)		André Myhrer	Sweden

The men's slalom competition of the Vancouver 2010 Olympics was held at Whistler Creekside in Whistler, British Columbia, on February 27, 2010.

Giuliano Razzoli of Italy won the gold and Ivica Kostelić of Croatia picked up his second silver medal of these Olympics; André Myhrer of Sweden took the bronze.

The last alpine event of the 2010 Olympics was held in challenging weather conditions, which included rain. The start was lowered 66 vertical feet (20 m), the same start as the women's race. More than 40 racers failed to complete the first run, including ten of the first thirty.

== Results ==
Rank	Bib	Name	Country	Run 1	Rank	Run 2	Rank	Total	Difference
1st place, gold medalist(s)	13	Giuliano Razzoli	Italy	47.79	1	51.53	7	1:39.32	+0.00
2nd place, silver medalist(s)	2	Ivica Kostelić	Croatia	48.37	4	51.11	3	1:39.48	+0.16
3rd place, bronze medalist(s)	12	André Myhrer	Sweden	49.03	10	50.73	1	1:39.76	+0.44
4	3	Benjamin Raich	Austria	48.33	3	51.48	6	1:39.81	+0.49
5	6	Marcel Hirscher	Austria	48.92	9	51.28	4	1:40.20	+0.88
6	9	Mitja Valenčič	Slovenia	48.22	2	52.13	19	1:40.35	+1.03
7	8	Manfred Mölgg	Italy	48.64	5	51.81	9	1:40.45	+1.13
8	19	Julien Cousineau	Canada	49.59	19	51.07	2	1:40.66	+1.34
9	4	Julien Lizeroux	France	48.82	8	51.90	10	1:40.72	+1.40
10	7	Reinfried Herbst	Austria	49.23	12	51.55	8	1:40.78	+1.46
11	37	Ondřej Bank	Czech Republic	48.69	6	52.12	18	1:40.81	+1.49
12	1	Silvan Zurbriggen	Switzerland	48.78	7	52.05	17	1:40.83	+1.51
13	14	Michael Janyk	Canada	49.18	11	51.91	11	1:41.09	+1.77
14	10	Mattias Hargin	Sweden	49.27	13	51.98	12	1:41.25	+1.93
15	23	Marc Gini	Switzerland	49.94	22	51.41	5	1:41.35	+2.03
16	41	Maxime Tissot	France	49.52	16	52.02	14	1:41.54	+2.22
17	31	Kjetil Jansrud	Norway	49.54	18	52.03	15	1:41.57	+2.25
18	27	Akira Sasaki	Japan	49.41	14	52.35	22	1:41.76	+2.44
19	43	Natko Zrnčić-Dim	Croatia	50.01	23	51.98	12	1:41.99	+2.67
20	33	Kilian Albrecht	Bulgaria	50.08	24	52.28	20	1:42.36	+3.04
21	38	Thomas Mermillod-Blondin	France	49.90	21	52.58	24	1:42.48	+3.16
22	30	Jens Byggmark	Sweden	50.50	27	52.03	15	1:42.53	+3.21
23	50	Aleksandr Khoroshilov	Russia	50.50	27	52.32	21	1:42.82	+3.50
24	46	Nolan Kasper	United States	50.66	29	52.51	23	1:43.17	+3.85
25	56	Stefan Georgiev	Bulgaria	50.86	30	53.06	25	1:43.92	+4.60
26	65	Cristian Javier Simari Birkner	Argentina	51.35	31	53.37	26	1:44.72	+5.40
27	53	David Ryding	Great Britain	51.58	33	53.55	27	1:45.13	+5.81
28	58	Christophe Roux	Moldova	51.90	35	53.85	28	1:45.75	+6.43
29	71	Andrew Noble	Great Britain	51.55	32	54.58	30	1:46.13	+6.81
30	66	Jaroslav Babušiak	Slovakia	52.10	37	54.76	31	1:46.86	+7.54
31	35	Trevor White	Canada	49.53	17	57.64	37	1:47.17	+7.85
32	61	Danko Marinelli	Croatia	52.28	38	55.05	32	1:47.33	+8.01
33	62	Vassilis Dimitriadis	Greece	51.96	36	56.20	35	1:48.16	+8.84
34	63	Jeroen Van den Bogaert	Belgium	53.99	42	54.57	29	1:48.56	+9.24
35	74	Mykhaylo Renzhyn	Israel	52.84	39	56.07	34	1:48.91	+9.59
36	75	Marko Rudić	Bosnia and Herzegovina	53.70	40	55.46	33	1:49.16	+9.84
37	76	Kristaps Zvejnieks	Latvia	53.82	41	57.47	36	1:51.29	+11.97
38	88	Igor Zakurdaev	Kazakhstan	54.41	43	58.40	38	1:52.81	+13.49
39	83	Rostyslav Feshchuk	Ukraine	55.35	45	58.44	39	1:53.79	+14.47
40	79	Bojan Kosić	Montenegro	56.15	46	59.17	41	1:55.32	+16.00
41	69	Hossein Saveh-Shemshaki	Iran	57.59	47	58.80	40	1:56.39	+17.07
42	90	Oleg Shamaev	Uzbekistan	57.65	48	1:00.40	42	1:58.05	+18.73
43	101	Li Lei	China	59.43	49	1:01.43	43	2:00.86	+21.54
44	98	Samir Azzimani	Morocco	1:00.43	50	1:02.00	44	2:02.43	+23.11
45	89	Shane O'Connor	Ireland	1:00.83	51	1:04.31	45	2:05.14	+25.82
46	99	Hubertus of Hohenlohe	Mexico	1:02.09	52	1:05.69	46	2:07.78	+28.46
47	102	Kwame Nkrumah-Acheampong	Ghana	1:09.08	53	1:13.52	48	2:22.60	+43.28
48	95	Erjon Tola	Albania	1:33.94	54	1:09.94	47	2:43.88	+1:04.56
	11	Steve Missillier	France	49.49	15	DNF			
	24	Patrick Thaler	Italy	50.13	25	DNF			
	22	Jimmy Cochran	United States	54.94	44	DNF			
	20	Axel Bäck	Sweden	50.25	26	DSQ			
	47	Sandro Viletta	Switzerland	49.85	20	DSQ			
	64	Iason Abramashvili	Georgia	51.89	34	DSQ			
	93	Markus Kilsgaard	Denmark	DNS					
	5	Manfred Pranger	Austria	DNF					
	15	Felix Neureuther	Germany	DNF					
	16	Ted Ligety	United States	DNF					
	17	Bode Miller	United States	DNF					
	18	Lars Elton Myhre	Norway	DNF					
	21	Urs Imboden	Moldova	DNF					
	25	Bernard Vajdič	Slovenia	DNF					
	26	Cristian Deville	Italy	DNF					
	28	Brad Spence	Canada	DNF					
	29	Filip Trejbal	Czech Republic	DNF					
	32	Marc Berthod	Switzerland	DNF					
	36	Matic Skube	Slovenia	DNF					
	39	Kentaro Minagawa	Japan	DNF					
	40	Truls Ove Karlsen	Norway	DNF					
	42	Leif Kristian Haugen	Norway	DNF					
	44	Dalibor Samsal	Croatia	DNF					
	45	Mitja Dragšič	Slovenia	DNF					
	48	Martin Vráblík	Czech Republic	DNF					
	49	Björgvin Björgvinsson	Iceland	DNF					
	51	Jung Dong-hyun	South Korea	DNF					
	52	Andreas Romar	Finland	DNF					
	54	Sergei Maitakov	Russia	DNF					
	55	Kim Woo-sung	South Korea	DNF					
	57	Bart Mollin	Belgium	DNF					
	59	Stefan Jon Sigurgeirsson	Iceland	DNF					
	60	Stepan Zuev	Russia	DNF					
	67	Pouria Saveh-Shemshaki	Iran	DNF					
	68	Roger Vidosa	Andorra	DNF					
	70	Ioan-Gabriel Nan	Romania	DNF					
	72	Stephanos Tsimikalis	Greece	DNF					
	73	Antonio Ristevski	Macedonia	DNF					
	77	Agustin Torres	Argentina	DNF					
	78	Jhonatan Longhi	Brazil	DNF					
	80	Márton Bene	Hungary	DNF					
	81	Deyvid Oprja	Estonia	DNF					
	84	Erdinç Türksever	Turkey	DNF					
	85	Vitalij Rumiancev	Lithuania	DNF					
	86	Jaba Gelashvili	Georgia	DNF					
	91	Christopher Papamichalopoulos	Cyprus	DNF					
	92	Andrei Drygin	Tajikistan	DNF					
	94	Jedrij Notz	Azerbaijan	DNF					
	96	Leyti Seck	Senegal	DNF					
	100	Dmitry Trelevski	Kyrgyzstan	DNF					
	34	Kryštof Krýzl	Czech Republic	DSQ					
	82	Ghassan Achi	Lebanon	DSQ					
	87	Arsen Nersisyan	Armenia	DSQ					
	97	Manfred Oettl Reyes	Peru	DSQ					
