= Will Brandenburg =

American alpine skier

Personal information
- Born: January 1, 1987 (age 39) Walla Walla, Washington, U.S.
- Height: 6 ft 1 in (1.85 m)
- Website: willbrandenburgusa.com

Skiing career
- Sport: Alpine skiing
- Club: Schweitzer Racing School
- Disciplines: Slalom; combined
- World Cup debut: December 16, 2007 (age 21)

Olympics
- Teams: 1 – (2010)
- Medals: 0

World Championships
- Teams: 3 – (2011, 2013, 2015)
- Medals: 0

World Cup
- Seasons: 5th – (2011–15)
- Podiums: 0
- Overall titles: 0 – (93rd in 2012)
- Discipline titles: 0 – (33rd in SL, 2012)

Will Brandenburg (born January 1, 1987) is a World Cup alpine ski racer on the U.S. Ski Team and specializes in slalom. Born in Walla Walla, Washington, he began skiing at 11 months of age and started racing at seven at Ski Bluewood near Dayton, Washington. He moved with his family to Spokane as a youth, then raced with the Spokane Ski Racing Association at Mt. Spokane, and later at Schweitzer Mountain near Sandpoint, Idaho. A 2005 graduate of Mead High School in Spokane, he also played high school football for the Panthers, with a brief stint at quarterback.

Brandenburg was named to the U.S. development team in May 2006. At the 2007 U.S. Alpine Championships in April, he placed second in the giant slalom at Alyeska, won by Ted Ligety. The day before, Brandenburg was named U.S. junior alpine ski racer of the year by Ski Racing magazine.

He was named to the U.S. team for the 2010 Winter Olympics, and finished tenth in the super combined event, won by Bode Miller. Brandenburg had the second best time in the slalom run, behind Ligety. He was also a member of the U.S. team for the 2011 World Championships racing in the slalom.

Brandenburg's best World Cup finish is sixth place in a slalom at Kranjska Gora, Slovenia in March 2012. He won the combined event at the 2013 U.S. Alpine Championships at Squaw Valley in Olympic Valley, California.

== World Cup top 30 finishes ==
Season	Date	Location	Discipline	Place
2011	Jan 9, 2011	Adelboden, Switzerland	Slalom	24th
2011	Jan 30, 2011	Chamonix, France	Super combined	22nd
2012	Jan 8, 2012	Adelboden, Switzerland	Slalom	22nd
2012	Mar 11, 2012	Kranjska Gora, Slovenia	Slalom	6th
2013	Nov 11, 2012	Levi, Finland	Slalom	15th
2014	Mar 9, 2014	Kranjska Gora, Slovenia	Slalom	23rd
2015	Jan 27, 2015	Schladming, Austria	Slalom	18th

== World Championship results ==
Year	Age	Slalom	Giant Slalom	Super-G	Downhill	Combined
2011	24	DNF1	—	—	—	—
2013	26	DNF1	—	—	—	DNF1
2015	28	DNF1	—	—	—	—

== Olympic results ==
Year	Age	Slalom	Giant Slalom	Super-G	Downhill	Combined
2010	23	—	—	—	—	10
