= Valsson =

Valsson is an Icelandic patronymic meaning "son of Valur". In Icelandic names, this is not a family name. Notable people with the name include:

- Valur Valsson (born 1961), Icelandic footballer
- Kristinn Ingi Valsson (born 1985), Icelandic alpine skier
- Valur Orri Valsson (born 1994), Icelandic basketball player
