= Felix Neureuther =

German alpine skier

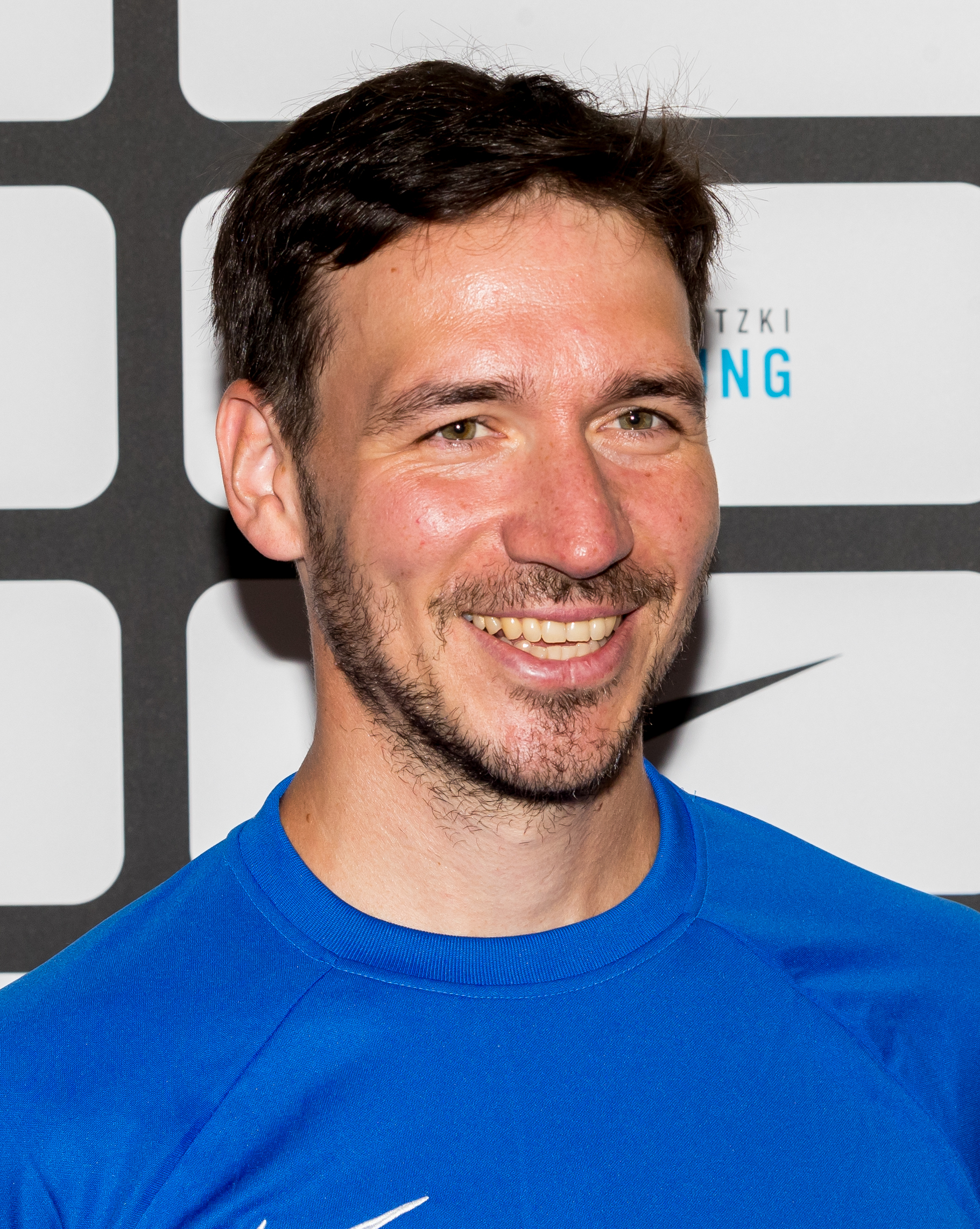
- Neureuther in 2022

Personal information
- Born: 26 March 1984 (age 42) Munich-Pasing, Bavaria, West Germany
- Height: 1.84 m (6 ft 0 in)
- Website: felix-neureuther.de

Skiing career
- Country: Germany
- Sport: Alpine skiing
- Club: SC Partenkirchen
- Retired: April 2019 (age 35)
- Disciplines: Slalom, giant slalom
- World Cup debut: 4 January 2003 (age 18)

Olympics
- Teams: 3 – (2006, 2010, 2014)
- Medals: 0

World Championships
- Teams: 9 – (2003–2019)
- Medals: 5 (1 gold)

World Cup
- Seasons: 17 – (2003–2019)
- Wins: 13 – (11 SL, 1 GS, 1 PS)
- Podiums: 47
- Overall titles: 0 – (4th in 2013, 2015)
- Discipline titles: 0 – (2nd in SL, 2013–2015)
Medal record
Men's alpine skiing
Representing Germany
World Cup race podiums
Event	1st	2nd	3rd
Slalom	11	13	13
Giant	1	3	3
Combined	0	1	0
Parallel	1	1	0
Total	13	18	16
International alpine ski competitions
Event	1st	2nd	3rd
Olympic Games	0	0	0
World Championships	1	1	3
Total	1	1	3
World Championships
Gold medal – first place	2005 Bormio	Team event
Silver medal – second place	2013 Schladming	Slalom
Bronze medal – third place	2013 Schladming	Team event
Bronze medal – third place	2015 Beaver Creek	Slalom
Bronze medal – third place	2017 St. Moritz	Slalom

Felix Neureuther (German pronunciation: [ˈfeːlɪks ˈnɔʏʁɔʏtɐ]; born 26 March 1984) is a German retired World Cup alpine ski racer and former World champion.

== Early life ==
Born in Munich-Pasing, Neureuther is the son of former World and Olympic champion Rosi Mittermaier and Christian Neureuther, a slalom specialist and winner of six World Cup races. He is the nephew of Evi Mittermaier, who was also a successful alpine ski racer and former Olympian in 1976 and 1980. As of 2020, the combined Neureuther–Mittermaier family has 31 World Cup wins, with 115 podium finishes.

== Career ==
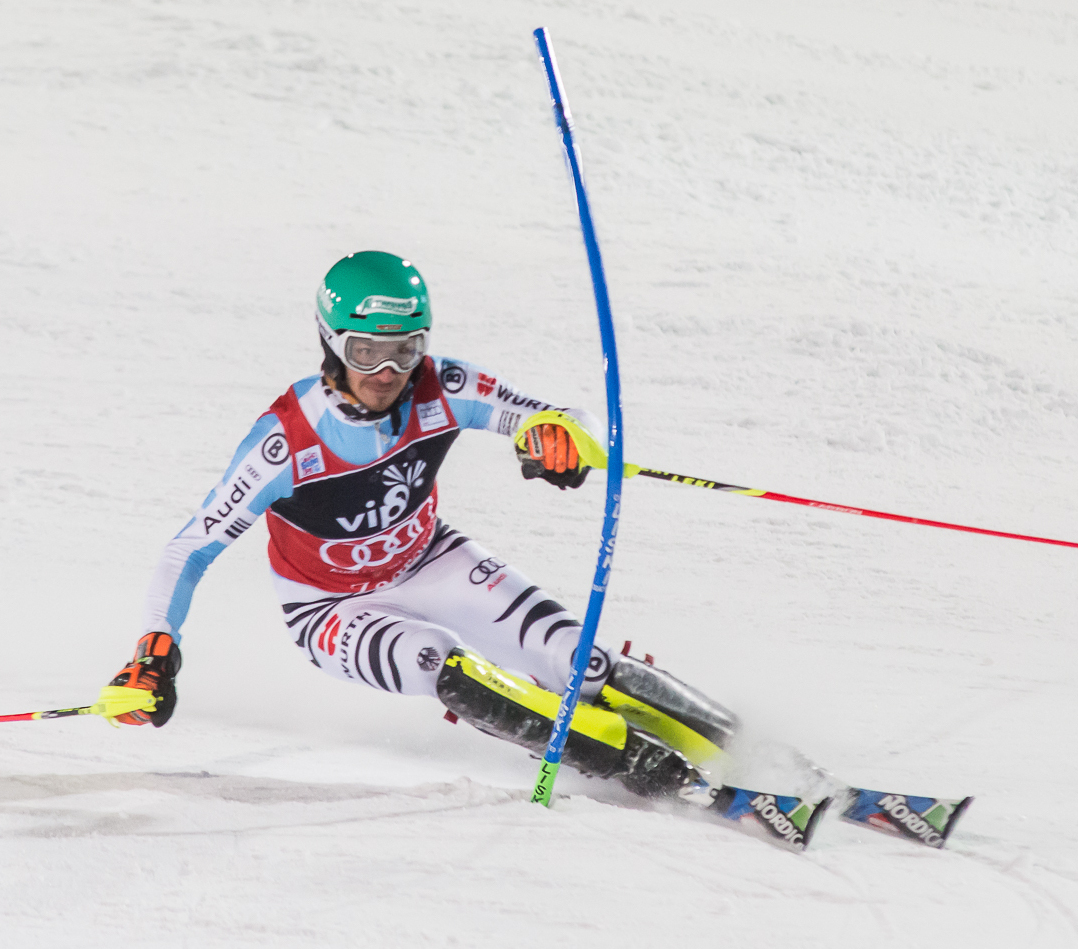
Neureuther in 2015

Neureuther was raised in Garmisch-Partenkirchen in Bavaria and was a member of the German national ski team. He has competed in nine World Championships and three Winter Olympics. Neureuther won a silver medal in the slalom at the 2013 World Championships and added a bronze medal in the team event. Previously, he had won a gold medal in the team event in 2005. He won bronze medals in slalom in 2015 and 2017.

Neureuther won his first World Cup race in 2010, in a slalom at Kitzbühel, Austria. He won his only giant slalom in January 2014 at Adelboden, Switzerland, which was only the second victory by a German male in a World Cup giant slalom; Max Rieger won the first in March 1973, nearly 41 years earlier in Quebec.

Through January 2019, Neureuther has thirteen World Cup victories and 47 podiums, making him Germany's most successful male World Cup skier. In March 2019 he announced his retirement from competition ahead of his final race, a slalom at the World Cup finals in Soldeu, Andorra.

== Personal life ==
Neureuther's parents are both former World Cup ski racers, members of the West German team in the 1970s. His father is Christian Neureuther, winner of six World Cup slaloms, and his mother is Rosi Mittermaier, a World, Olympic, and World Cup champion, all in 1976. At the 1976 Winter Olympics, she won medals in all three alpine events, two golds and a silver. Since 2013 he has been in a relationship with biathlete Miriam Gössner; in October 2017 she gave birth to the couple's first child, a girl named Matilda, and the couple married in December the same year.

One of Neureuther's childhood friends is footballer Bastian Schweinsteiger. He presented Schweinsteiger with the "Special jury award" at the 2016 Bambi Awards.

== World Cup results ==
=== Season standings ===
Season
Season	Age	Overall	Slalom	Giant slalom	Super G	Downhill	Combined
2004	19	62	25	—	—	—	—
2005	20	83	33	—	48	—	—
2006	21	48	17	41	—	—	—
2007	22	32	8	31	—	—	—
2008	23	25	7	—	—	—	—
2009	24	47	15	—	—	—	43
2010	25	21	5	44	—	—	42
2011	26	17	8	29	—	—	11
2012	27	22	6	36	—	—	—
2013	28	4	2	6	—	—	—
2014	29	5	2	5	—	—	—
2015	30	4	2	8	—	—	—
2016	31	8	3	7	—	—	—
2017	32	5	4	4	—	—	—
2018	33	62	25	(knee injury in November: out for season)			
2019	34	38	14	46	—	—	—

=== Race podiums ===
	Total	Slalom	Giant slalom	Super G	Combined	Parallel
Wins	13	11	1	–	–	1
Podiums	47	37	7	–	1	2

Season
Season	Date	Location	Discipline	Place
2007	13 December 2006	(United States) Beaver Creek, USA	Slalom	3rd
2007	25 February 2007	Garmisch, Germany	Slalom	2nd
2008	17 December 2007	Alta Badia, Italy	Slalom	2nd
2008	6 January 2008	Adelboden, Switzerland	Slalom	3rd
2009	11 January 2009	Adelboden, Switzerland	Slalom	3rd
2009	1 March 2009	Kranjska Gora, Slovenia	Slalom	3rd
2010	24 January 2010	Kitzbühel, Austria	Slalom	1st
2010	13 March 2010	Garmisch, Germany	Slalom	1st
2011	26 February 2011	Bansko, Bulgaria	Super combined	2nd
2011	19 March 2011	Lenzerheide, Switzerland	Slalom	3rd
2012	19 December 2011	Alta Badia, Italy	Slalom	3rd
2012	5 January 2012	Zagreb, Croatia	Slalom	2nd
2012	21 February 2012	Moscow, Russia	Parallel slalom	2nd
2012	18 March 2012	Schladming, Austria	Slalom	2nd
2013	8 December 2012	Val d'Isère, France	Slalom	2nd
2013	18 December 2012	Madonna di Campiglio, Italy	Slalom	2nd
2013	1 January 2013	Munich, Germany	Parallel slalom	1st
2013	12 January 2013	Adelboden, Switzerland	Giant slalom	3rd
2013	20 January 2013	Wengen, Switzerland	Slalom	1st
2013	27 January 2013	Kitzbühel, Austria	Slalom	2nd
2013	17 March 2013	Lenzerheide, Switzerland	Slalom	1st
2014	6 January 2014	Bormio, Italy	Slalom	1st
2014	11 January 2014	Adelboden, Switzerland	Giant slalom	1st
2014	19 January 2014	Wengen, Switzerland	Slalom	2nd
2014	24 January 2014	Kitzbühel, Austria	Slalom	1st
2014	28 January 2014	Schladming, Austria	Slalom	3rd
2014	9 March 2014	Kranjska Gora, Slovenia	Slalom	1st
2014	15 March 2013	Lenzerheide, Switzerland	Giant slalom	3rd
2014	16 March 2013	Lenzerheide, Switzerland	Slalom	2nd
2015	16 November 2014	Levi, Finland	Slalom	3rd
2015	14 December 2014	Åre, Sweden	Slalom	2nd
2015	22 December 2014	Madonna di Campiglio, Italy	Slalom	1st
2015	6 January 2015	Zagreb, Croatia	Slalom	2nd
2015	17 January 2015	Wengen, Switzerland	Slalom	1st
2015	25 January 2015	Kitzbühel, Austria	Slalom	3rd
2015	27 January 2015	Schladming, Austria	Slalom	3rd
2015	1 March 2015	Garmisch, Germany	Giant slalom	2nd
2016	12 December 2015	Val d'Isère, France	Giant slalom	2nd
2016	13 December 2015	Val d'Isère, France	Slalom	3rd
2016	14 February 2016	Naeba, Japan	Slalom	1st
2017	23 October 2016	Sölden, Austria	Giant slalom	3rd
2017	5 January 2017	Zagreb, Croatia	Slalom	2nd
2017	15 January 2017	Wengen, Switzerland	Slalom	3rd
2017	5 March 2017	Kranjska Gora, Slovenia	Slalom	3rd
2017	18 March 2017	(United States) Aspen, USA	Giant slalom	2nd
2017	19 March 2017	(United States) Aspen, USA	Slalom	2nd
2018	12 November 2017	Levi, Finland	Slalom	1st

== World Championship results ==
Year	Age	Slalom	Giant slalom	Super-G	Downhill	Combined	Team event
2003	18	15	35	—	—	—	—
2005	20	19	DNF1	—	—	—	1
2007	22	DNF2	DNF1	—	—	—	—
2009	24	4	19	—	—	—	—
2011	26	DNF2	34	—	—	—	QF
2013	28	2	10	—	—	—	3
2015	30	3	4	—	—	—	1st round
2017	32	3	16	—	—	—	1st round
2019	34	DSQ2	—	—	—	—	—

== Olympic results ==
Year	Age	Slalom	Giant slalom	Super-G	Downhill	Combined
2006	21	DNF2	DNF1	—	—	—
2010	25	DNF1	8	—	—	—
2014	29	DNF2	8	—	—	—
2018	33	injured: did not compete				
