= André Myhrer =

Swedish alpine skier

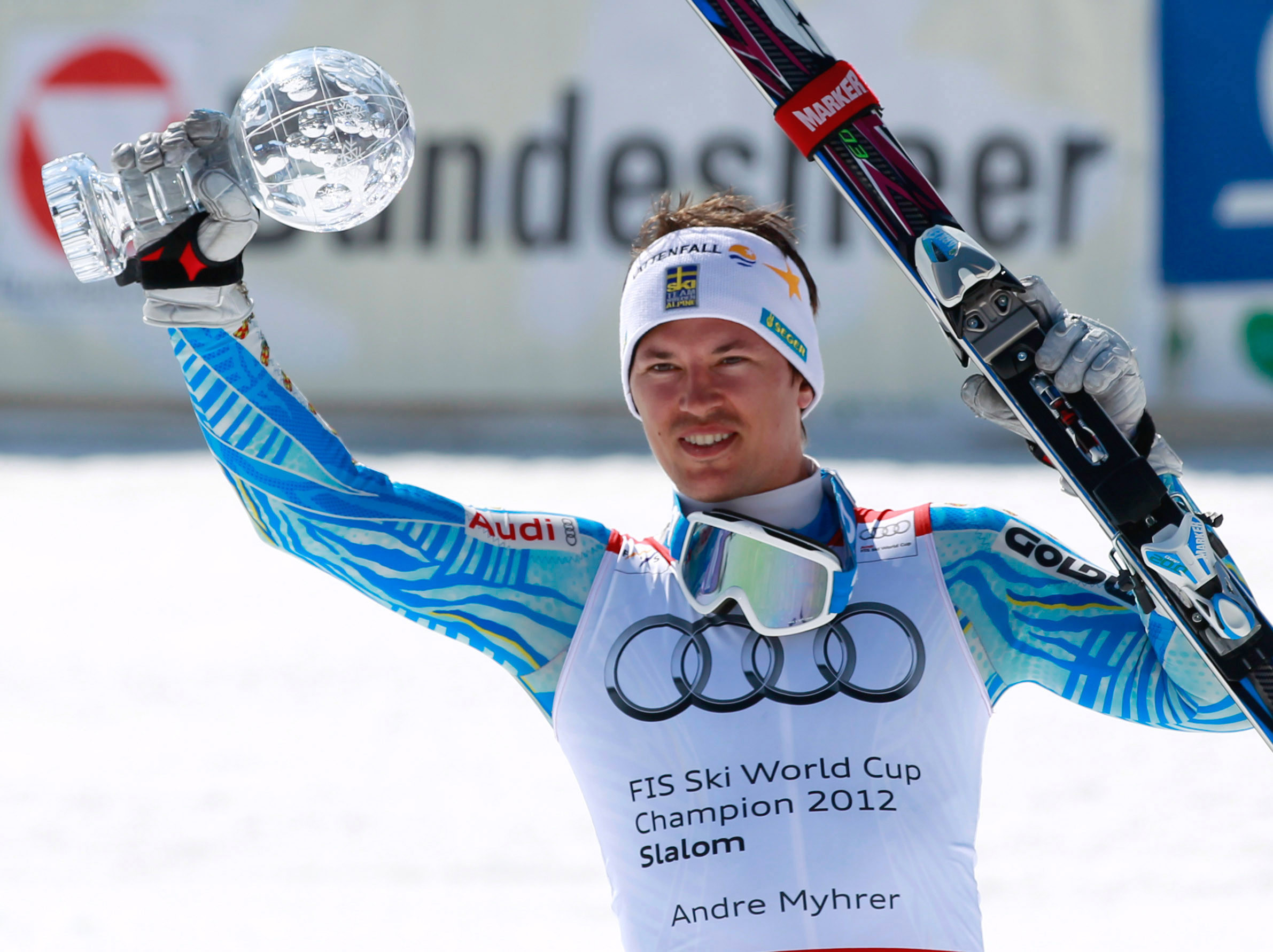
- Myhrer in March 2012

Personal information
- Born: 11 January 1983 (age 43) Nordanstig, Sweden
- Height: 1.89 m (6 ft 2 in)
- Website: AndreMyhrer.com

Skiing career
- Sport: Alpine skiing
- Club: Bergsjö Hassela AK
- Retired: 8 February 2020 (age 37)
- Disciplines: Slalom, giant slalom
- World Cup debut: 25 January 2004 (age 21)

Olympics
- Teams: 4 – (2006–2018)
- Medals: 2 (1 gold)

World Championships
- Teams: 9 – (2003–2019)
- Medals: 3 (0 gold)

World Cup
- Seasons: 17 – (2004–2020)
- Wins: 8 – (7 SL, 1 PS)
- Podiums: 30 – (23 SL, 6 PS, 1 PG)
- Overall titles: 0 – (9th in 2013)
- Discipline titles: 1 – (SL, 2012)
Medal record
Men's alpine skiing
Representing Sweden
Event	1st	2nd	3rd
Olympic Games	1	0	1
World Championships	0	1	2
Total	1	1	3
Olympic Games
Gold medal – first place	2018 Pyeongchang	Slalom
Bronze medal – third place	2010 Vancouver	Slalom
World Championships
Silver medal – second place	2013 Schladming	Team event
Bronze medal – third place	2015 Beaver Creek	Team event
Bronze medal – third place	2017 St. Moritz	Team event

André Myhrer (born 11 January 1983) is a retired Swedish World Cup alpine ski racer and Olympic gold medalist. Born at Bergsjö in Gävleborg County, Myhrer competed in the technical events and specialised in slalom.

== Career ==
Myhrer made his World Cup debut in January 2004 and his first victory came at Beaver Creek, Colorado, in December 2006. Myhrer represented Sweden at the 2006 Winter Olympics and tied for fourth place in the slalom, only 0.03 s from third. At the 2010 Olympics he was tenth after the first run of the slalom at Whistler, then had the fastest time in the second and won the bronze medal. In 2018, Myhrer won the Olympic slalom competition after both main favourites had failed to finish. In addition to four Olympics, Myhrer has competed in nine World Championships.

In his career, Myhrer has eight World Cup victories and 30 podiums, 22 in slalom and 8 in parallel races. He won the 2012 season title in slalom and finished eleventh in the overall standings.

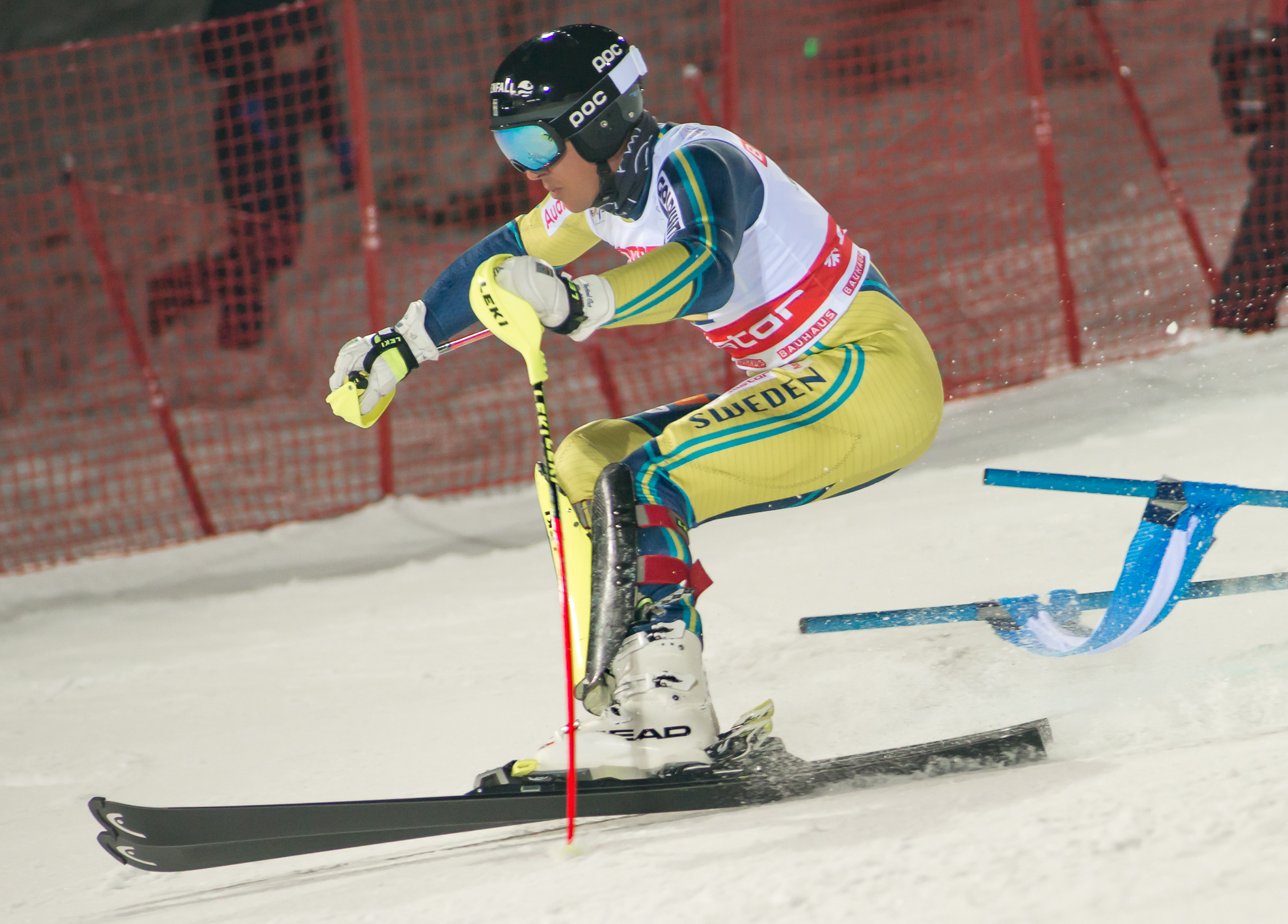
Andre Myhrer in Hammarbybacken World Cup 2018

He was awarded the Hälsingland Golden Award in 2005, 2012 och 2018.

== World Cup results ==
=== Season titles ===
Season	Discipline
2012	Slalom

=== Season standings ===
Season	Age	Overall	Slalom	Giant slalom	Super-G	Downhill	Combined
2004	21	89	37	—	—	—	—
2005	22	34	9	—	—	—	—
2006	23	39	12	—	—	—	—
2007	24	44	13	—	—	—	—
2008	25	48	19	38	—	—	—
2009	26	33	11	46	—	—	28
2010	27	42	13	—	—	—	—
2011	28	18	3	—	—	—	—
2012	29	11	1	26	—	—	—
2013	30	9	4	31	—	—	—
2014	31	30	12	26	—	—	—
2015	32	31	12	27	—	—	—
2016	33	15	4	15	—	—	—
2017	34	15	9	15	—	—	—
2018	35	11	3	23	—	—	—
2019	36	28	10	—	—	—	—
2020	37	31	8	—	—	—	—

=== Race podiums ===
- 8 wins – (7 SL, 1 PS)
- 30 podiums – (23 SL, 6 PS, 1 PG)

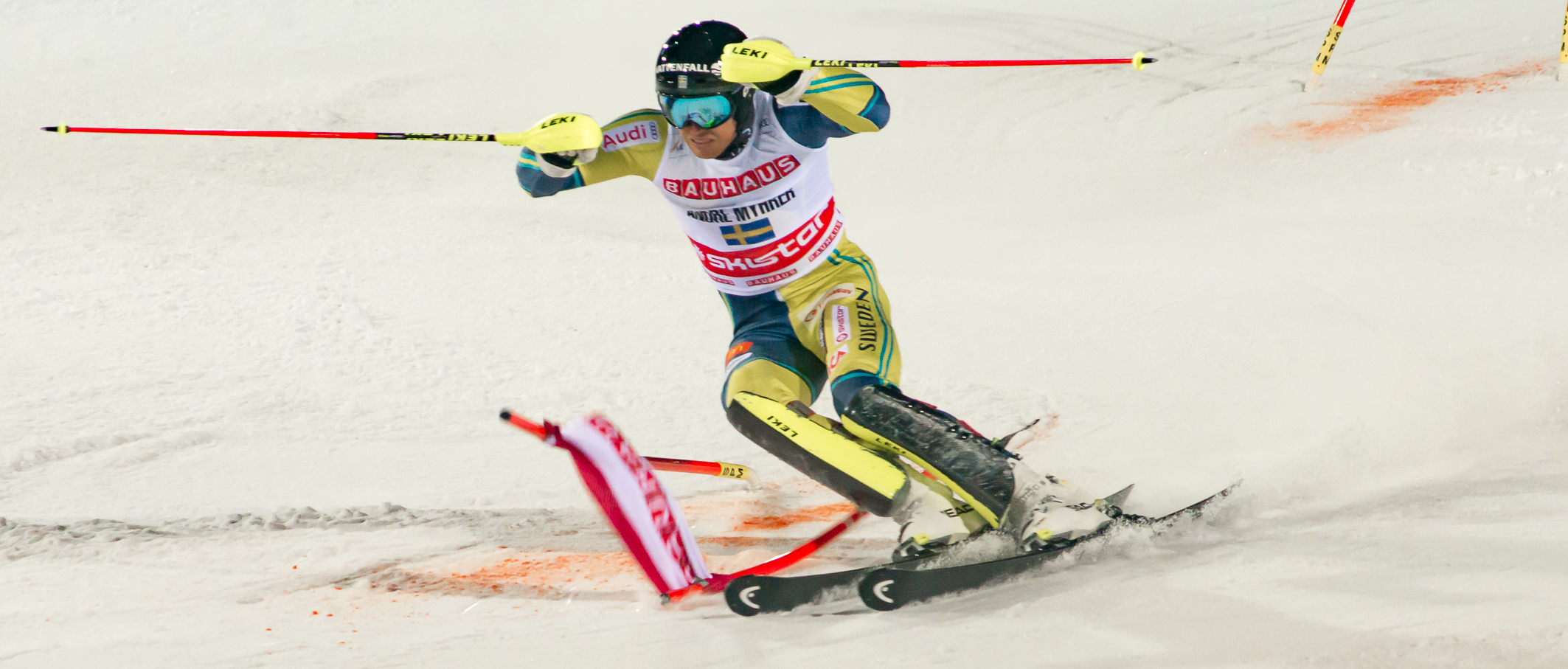
Andre Myhrer in Hammarbybacken World Cup 2018

Season	Date	Location	Discipline	Place
2005	25 Jan 2005	Schladming, Austria	Slalom	3rd
2005	27 Feb 2005	Kranjska Gora, Slovenia	Slalom	2nd
2007	3 Dec 2006	(United States) Beaver Creek, USA	Slalom	1st
2010	17 Jan 2010	Wengen, Switzerland	Slalom	2nd
2010	13 Mar 2010	Garmisch, Germany	Slalom	3rd
2011	14 Nov 2010	Levi, Finland	Slalom	2nd
2011	6 Jan 2011	Zagreb, Croatia	Slalom	1st
2011	25 Jan 2011	Schladming, Austria	Slalom	2nd
2012	21 Dec 2011	Flachau, Austria	Slalom	2nd
2012	15 Jan 2012	Wengen, Switzerland	Slalom	2nd
2012	19 Feb 2012	Bansko, Bulgaria	Slalom	2nd
2012	21 Feb 2012	Moscow, Russia	Parallel slalom	3rd
2012	11 Mar 2012	Kranjska Gora, Slovenia	Slalom	1st
2012	18 Mar 2012	Schladming, Austria	Slalom	1st
2013	11 Nov 2012	Levi, Finland	Slalom	1st
2013	6 Jan 2013	Zagreb, Croatia	Slalom	2nd
2013	29 Jan 2013	Moscow, Russia	Parallel slalom	2nd
2014	12 Jan 2014	Adelboden, Switzerland	Slalom	2nd
2016	21 Dec 2015	Alta Badia, Italy	Parallel-G	3rd
2016	14 Feb 2016	Naeba, Japan	Slalom	2nd
2016	23 Feb 2016	Stockholm, Sweden	Parallel slalom	2nd
2016	20 Mar 2016	St. Moritz, Switzerland	Slalom	1st
2017	19 Mar 2017	(United States) Aspen, USA	Slalom	1st
2018	10 Dec 2017	Val d'Isére, France	Slalom	3rd
2018	1 Jan 2018	Oslo, Norway	Parallel slalom	1st
2018	14 Jan 2018	Wengen, Switzerland	Slalom	3rd
2018	30 Jan 2018	Stockholm, Sweden	Parallel slalom	2nd
2019	18 Nov 2018	Levi, Finland	Slalom	3rd
2019	19 Feb 2019	Stockholm, Sweden	Parallel slalom	2nd
2020	15 Dec 2019	Val d'Isére, France	Slalom	2nd

== World Championship results ==
Year	Age	Slalom	Giant slalom	Super-G	Downhill	Combined	Team event
2003	20	DNF1	—	—	—	—	not run
2005	22	5	—	—	—	—	7
2007	24	22	20	—	—	—	—
2009	26	DNF1	DNF1	—	—	—	cancelled
2011	28	10	—	—	—	—	—
2013	30	4	14	—	—	—	2
2015	32	6	DNF1	—	—	—	3
2017	34	6	DNS2	—	—	—	3
2019	36	13	—	—	—	—	5

== Olympic results ==
Year	Age	Slalom	Giant slalom	Super-G	Downhill	Combined	Team event
2006	23	4	—	—	—	—	not run
2010	27	3	DNF2	—	—	—	not run
2014	31	DNF2	—	—	—	—	not run
2018	35	1	23	—	—	—	5

== Video ==
- youtube.com – Myhrer wins at Levi – 11 November 2012
