= Jean-Baptiste Grange =

French alpine skier (born 1984)

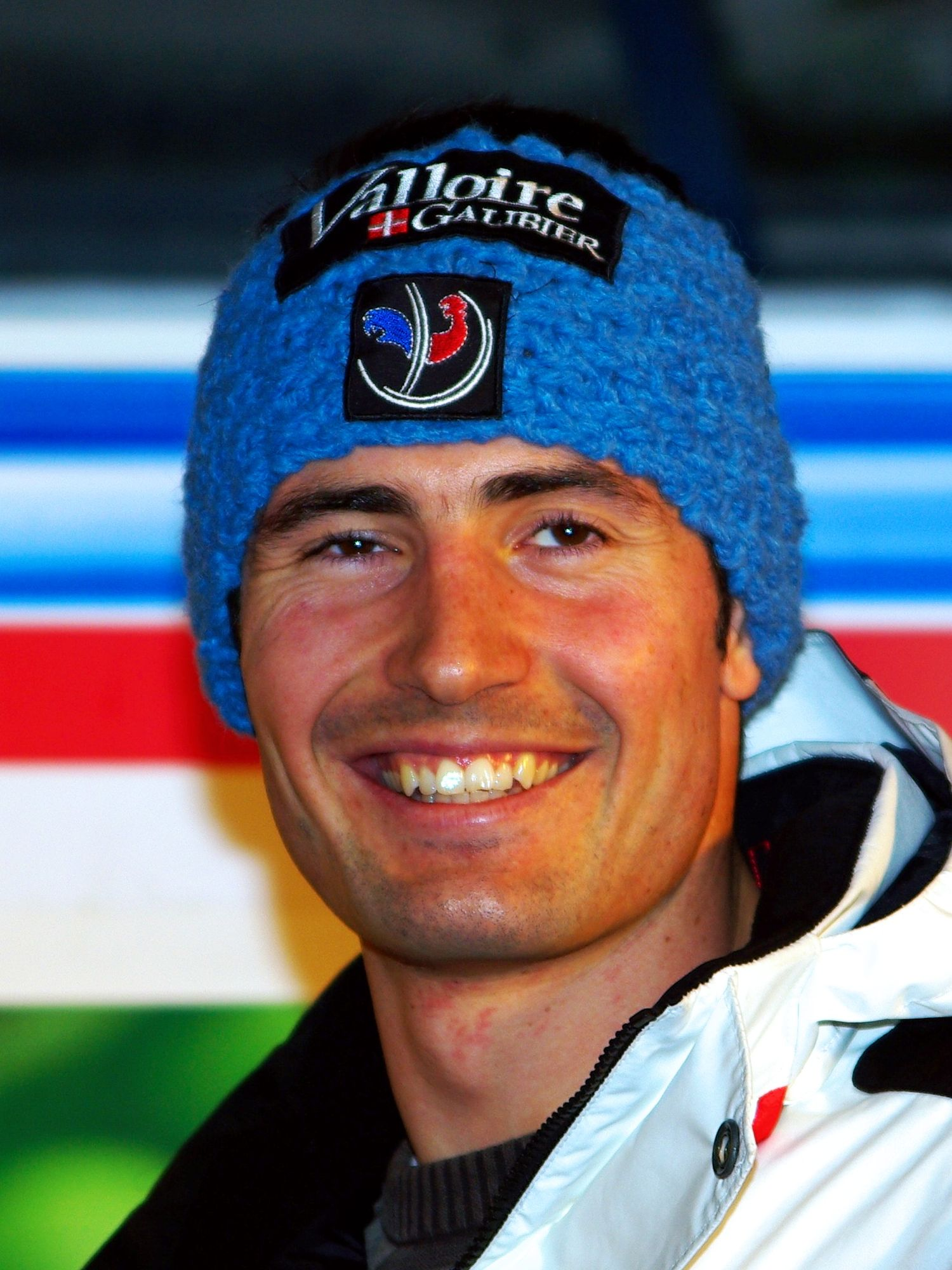
- Grange in January 2008

Personal information
- Born: 10 October 1984 (age 41) Saint-Jean-de-Maurienne, Savoie, France
- Height: 181 cm (5 ft 11 in)
- Website: jbgrange.com

Skiing career
- Sport: Alpine skiing
- Club: EMHM – SC Valloire
- Retired: 21 March 2021
- Disciplines: Slalom
- World Cup debut: 11 January 2004 – (age 19)

Olympics
- Teams: 2 – (2006, 2014)
- Medals: 0

World Championships
- Teams: 5 – (2007–15)
- Medals: 3 (2 gold)

World Cup
- Seasons: 15 – (2004–2018)
- Wins: 9 – (8 SL, 1 SC)
- Podiums: 18 – (15 SL, 3 SC)
- Overall titles: 0 – (5th – 2009)
- Discipline titles: 1 – (SL – 2009)
Medal record
Men's alpine skiing
Representing France
World Championships
Gold medal – first place	2011 Garmisch	Slalom
Gold medal – first place	2015 Beaver Creek	Slalom
Bronze medal – third place	2007 Åre	Slalom

Jean-Baptiste Grange (born 10 October 1984) is a French retired World Cup alpine ski racer. He competed primarily in slalom and earlier also in giant slalom and combined.

Born in Saint-Jean-de-Maurienne, Savoie, Grange grew up in Valloire, Galibier, and made his World Cup debut at age 19 in January 2004. In February 2007, he won the bronze medal in the slalom at the 2007 World Championships in Åre, Sweden. He won his first World Cup race on 17 December 2007, and won the 2009 season title in the slalom. Injured in early December 2009 in a giant slalom at Beaver Creek, he opted for surgery and missed the remainder of the 2010 season, which included the 2010 Winter Olympics. He returned to competition for the 2011 season and won the world championship in the slalom. He won his second slalom world title in Beaver Creek on 15 February 2015.

His older brother is François-Cyrille Grange, also an alpine ski racer.

== World Cup results ==
=== Season standings ===
Season	Age	Overall	Slalom	Giant slalom	Super-G	Downhill	Combined
2006	21	76	40	—	—	—	22
2007	22	29	10	—	—	—	17
2008	23	8	2	26	—	—	4
2009	24	5	1	11	—	—	6
2010	25	56	29	31	—	—	22
2011	26	16	2	42	—	—	—
2012	27	34	22	17	—	—	—
2013	28	69	23	—	—	—	—
2014	29	32	8	—	—	—	—
2015	30	42	13	—	—	—	—
2016	31	61	19	—	—	—	—
2017	32	60	20	—	—	—	—
2018	33	53	21	—	—	—	—
2019	34	63	22	—	—	—	—
2020	35	73	17	—	—	—	—
2021	36	59	19	—	—	—	—

- Standings through 21 March 2021

=== Season titles ===
Season	Discipline
2009	Slalom

=== Race podiums ===
- 9 wins – (8 SL, 1 AC)
- 18 podiums – (15 SL, 3 AC)

Season	Date	Location	Discipline	Place
2008	29 Nov 2007	(United States) Beaver Creek, USA	Super combined	2nd
2008	17 Dec 2007	Alta Badia, Italy	Slalom	1st
2008	11 Jan 2008	Wengen, Switzerland	Super combined	1st
2008	12 Jan 2008	Wengen, Switzerland	Slalom	1st
2008	20 Jan 2008	Kitzbühel, Austria	Slalom	1st
2008	22 Jan 2008	Schladming, Austria	Slalom	2nd
2009	16 Nov 2008	Levi, Finland	Slalom	1st
2009	12 Dec 2008	Val-d'Isère, France	Super combined	2nd
2009	22 Dec 2008	Alta Badia, Italy	Slalom	2nd
2009	6 Jan 2009	Zagreb, Croatia	Slalom	1st
2009	25 Jan 2009	Kitzbühel, Austria	Slalom	2nd
2009	14 Mar 2009	Åre, Sweden	Slalom	3rd
2010	15 Nov 2009	Levi, Finland	Slalom	3rd
2011	14 Nov 2010	Levi, Finland	Slalom	1st
2011	16 Jan 2011	Wengen, Switzerland	Slalom	3rd
2011	23 Jan 2011	Kitzbühel, Austria	Slalom	1st
2011	25 Jan 2011	Schladming, Austria	Slalom	1st
2011	27 Feb 2011	Bansko, Bulgaria	Slalom	3rd

== World Championship results ==
Year	Age	Slalom	Giant slalom	Super-G	Downhill	Combined
2007	22	3	14	—	—	—
2009	24	DNF2	7	—	—	DNF2
2011	26	1	—	—	—	—
2013	28	12	—	—	—	—
2015	30	1	—	—	—	—
2017	32	23	—	—	—	—

== Olympic results ==
Year	Age	Slalom	Giant slalom	Super-G	Downhill	Combined
2006	21	DNF2	—	—	—	13
2010	25	injured: did not compete				
2014	29	DNF2	—	—	—	—
2018	33	DNF1	—	—	—	—
