= Patrick Thaler =

Italian alpine skier

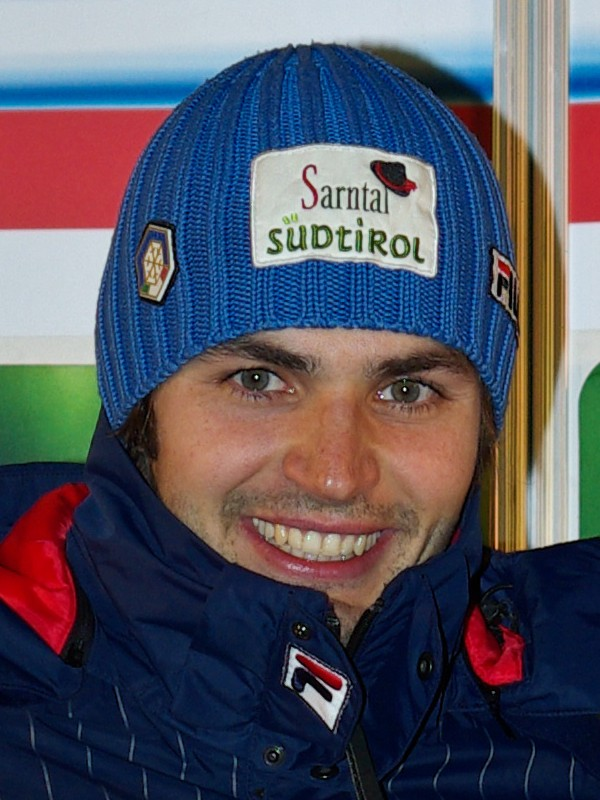
- Thaler in Schladming in 2009

Personal information
- Born: 23 March 1978 (age 48) Bolzano, South Tyrol, Italy
- Height: 177 cm (5 ft 10 in)
- Website: patrickthaler.com

Skiing career
- Sport: Alpine skiing
- Club: C.S. Carabinieri
- Retired: 23 January 2018 (age 39)
- Disciplines: Slalom
- World Cup debut: 8 March 1997 (age 18)

Olympics
- Teams: 3 – (2006, 2010, 2014)
- Medals: 0

World Championships
- Teams: 5 – (2007, 2009, 2013, 2015, 2017)
- Medals: 0

World Cup
- Seasons: 22 – (1997–2018)
- Wins: 0
- Podiums: 3 – (3 SL)
- Overall titles: 0 – (21st in 2014)
- Discipline titles: 0 – (4th in SL, 2014)
Medal record
Men's alpine skiing
Representing Italy
Junior World Ski Championships
Silver medal – second place	1997 Schladming	Giant Slalom

Patrick Thaler (born 23 March 1978) is a retired World Cup alpine ski racer from northern Italy. Born in Bolzano, South Tyrol, he specialized in the slalom. Thaler competed for Italy at the 2006, 2010 and 2014 Winter Olympics but failed to finish. His best result from Alpine World Ski Championships is a seventh place in Val-d'Isère, France, in 2009.

== Career ==
During his World Cup career, he reached three third-place finishes in the slalom – twice at Kitzbühel, Austria, and once at Val d'Isère. In addition, he has 25 top-10 finishes. He is one of the oldest (35 years, 10 months, 2 days) slalom skiers to have finished in the top-3 in the World cup (in 2014) and the oldest (38 years, 11 months, 11 days) to have finished in the top-10 (in 2017).

Thaler retired from ski racing on January 23, 2018, after having competed in the World Cup for a record of 22 seasons (1997–2018).

== World Cup results ==
=== Season standings ===
Season	Age	Overall	Slalom	Giant Slalom	Super G	Downhill	Combined
1997	18	unranked	0 points				
1998	19	103	—	42	—	—	—
1999	20	unranked	0 points				
2000	21	117	—	44	—	—	—
2001	22	unranked	0 points				
2002	23	unranked	0 points				
2003	24	unranked	0 points				
2004	25	105	46	—	—	—	—
2005	26	58	19	—	—	—	—
2006	27	57	19	—	—	—	—
2007	28	101	38	—	—	—	—
2008	29	57	20	—	—	—	—
2009	30	51	18	—	—	—	—
2010	31	96	34	—	—	—	—
2011	32	132	49	—	—	—	—
2012	33	51	16	—	—	—	—
2013	34	46	17	—	—	—	—
2014	35	21	4	—	—	—	—
2015	36	56	18	—	—	—	—
2016	37	42	10	—	—	—	—
2017	38	64	22	—	—	—	—
2018	39	141	49	—	—	—	—

=== Race podiums ===
- 3 podiums – (3 SL)

Season	Date	Location	Discipline	Place
2009	25 Jan 2009	Kitzbühel, Austria	Slalom	3rd
2014	15 Dec 2013	Val d'Isère, France	Slalom	3rd
2014	24 Jan 2014	Kitzbühel, Austria	Slalom	3rd

== Olympic results ==
Year	Age	Slalom
2006	27	DNF1
2010	31	DNF2
2014	35	DNF1

== World Championships results ==
Year	Age	Slalom
2007	28	DNF1
2009	30	7
2013	34	DNF2
2015	36	DNF2
2017	38	24
