= Geoffrey Osch =

Luxembourgish alpine skier (born 1994)

Personal information
- Born: 2 May 1994 (age 32)

Skiing career
- Sport: Alpine skiing

Geoffrey Osch (born 2 May 1994) is a Luxembourgish alpine ski racer.

He competed at the 2015 World Championships in Beaver Creek, USA, in the giant slalom.
