= Sindri Már Pálsson =

Icelandic alpine skier (born 1982)

Personal information
- Nationality: Icelandic
- Born: 21 December 1982 (age 42)

Sport
- Sport: Alpine skiing

Sindri Már Pálsson (born 21 December 1982) is an Icelandic alpine skier. He competed in three events at the 2006 Winter Olympics.
