= Kristinn Ingi Valsson =

Icelandic alpine skier (born 1985)

Personal information
- Nationality: Icelandic
- Born: 6 June 1985 (age 39)

Sport
- Sport: Alpine skiing

Kristinn Ingi Valsson (born 6 June 1985) is an Icelandic alpine skier. He competed in the men's slalom at the 2006 Winter Olympics.
