= Trevor White (skier) =

Canadian alpine skier (born 1984)

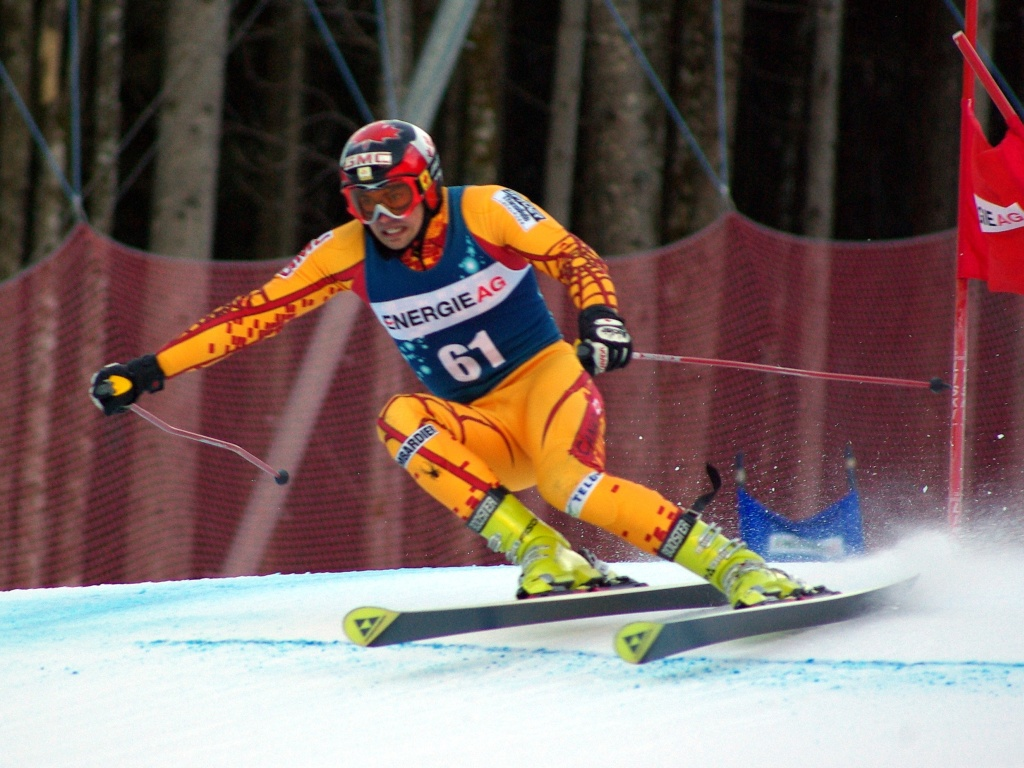

Personal information
- Born: 27 April 1984 (age 42) Calgary, Alberta, Canada
- Height: 175 cm (69 in)
- Weight: 77 kg (170 lb)

Sport
- Sport: Skiing
- Club: Fortress Alpine Ski Team, Calgary
- Updated on 18 February 2010

Trevor White (born 27 April 1984) is a Canadian alpine skier.

He competed at the 2010 Winter Olympics in Vancouver in the men's slalom competition.
