= Philipp Schmid =

German alpine skier (born 1986)

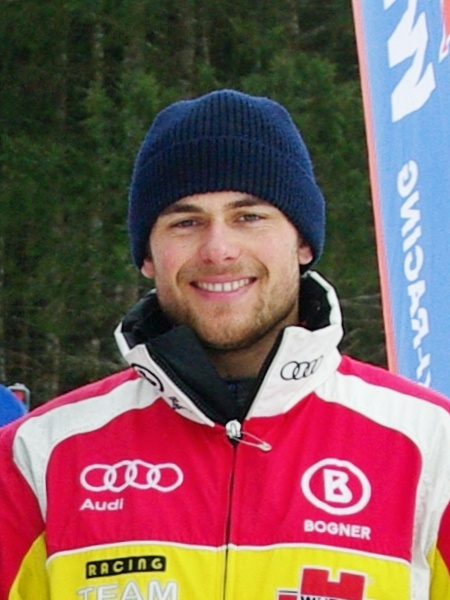
- Philipp Schmid

Personal information
- Born: 7 May 1986 (age 40)

Skiing career
- Sport: Alpine skiing ♂

Philipp Schmid (born 7 May 1986) is a German alpine ski racer.

He competed at the 2015 World Championships in Beaver Creek, US, in the slalom.
