= Li Lei (skier) =

Chinese alpine ski racer (born 1987)

Li Lei (Chinese: 李雷; born February 18, 1987, in Harbin) is a Chinese male alpine ski racer.

He competed for China at the 2010 Winter Olympics in the Slalom and Giant Slalom events.
