= Kristján Uni Óskarsson =

Icelandic alpine skier (born 1984)

Personal information
- Nationality: Icelandic
- Born: 4 February 1984 (age 42)

Sport
- Sport: Alpine skiing

Kristján Uni Óskarsson (born 4 February 1984) is an Icelandic alpine skier. He competed in two events at the 2006 Winter Olympics.
