= Brad Spence (skier) =

Canadian alpine skier (born 1984)

Personal information
- Born: 19 April 1984 (age 42) Calgary, Alberta, Canada
- Height: 184 cm (6 ft 0 in)
- Weight: 95 kg (209 lb)

Sport
- Sport: Skiing
- Club: Panorama Ski Club, Calgary
- Updated on 18 February 2010

Brad Spence (born 19 April 1984) is a Canadian alpine skier.

He competed at the 2010 Winter Olympics in Vancouver in the men's slalom and giant slalom competitions.
