= Patrick Biggs =

Canadian alpine skier (born 1982)

Personal information
- Born: 11 October 1982 (age 43) Berwick, Victoria, Australia
- Website: www.patbiggs.com

Skiing career
- Sport: Alpine skiing
- Disciplines: Slalom; Giant slalom
- World Cup debut: 9 January 2005

Olympics
- Teams: 2

World Championships
- Teams: 2

World Cup
- Seasons: 8

Patrick Biggs (born 11 October 1982) is a Canadian alpine skier.

Born in Berwick, Australia, Biggs has twice finished in the top 10 in the slalom at World Cup events, both in 2005 and has won multiple medals at the Canadian championships in slalom. He participated in the 2006 Olympics, finishing 10th in the first run, but failing to finish the second. He has also competed in two Alpine Skiing World Championships, ending up 9th in the slalom on both occasions, in 2005 and 2007 He competed in the 2010 Winter Olympics in Vancouver, Canada.
