= Attila Marosi =

Hungarian alpine skier (born 1982)

Personal information
- Nationality: Hungarian
- Born: 1 October 1982 (age 44) Budapest, Hungary

Sport
- Sport: Alpine skiing

Attila Marosi (born 1 October 1982) is a Hungarian alpine skier. He competed in two events at the 2006 Winter Olympics.
