= Bob Biver =

Luxembourgish alpine skier (born 1985)

Bob Biver (born February 17, 1985) is a Luxembourgish alpine skier.

Bob first skied at the age of 3 and joined the Luxembourg national ski team at the age of 10. He won the slalom on the national championships in Adelboden, and participated at the 2007 Alpine World Ski Championships in Åre in slalom and giant slalom.
