= Shane O'Connor (skier) =

Irish alpine skier (born 1973)

Personal information
- Born: November 15, 1973 (age 52) Dublin, Ireland
- Height: 1.44 m (4 ft 9 in)

Skiing career
- Sport: Alpine skiing
- Club: Ski Club of Ireland
- Retired: February, 2010 (age 36)
- Disciplines: Slalom
- World Cup debut: February, 1993 (age 18)

Olympics
- Teams: 1 - (2010)

World Championships
- Teams: 5 - (1993)(2003)(2005)(2007)(2009)

Shane O'Connor (born November 15, 1973) is a former alpine skier from Ireland who represented his country in five World Championships and one Winter Olympic Games. He competed for Ireland at the 2010 Winter Olympics, finishing 45th in the slalom.

Shane was born in Dublin and competed for Ireland in the five World Alpine Ski Championships - Morioka, Japan 1993, St. Moritz, Switzerland 2003, Bormio, Italy 2005, Are, Sweden 2006 and Val d’Isere, France 2009 and one Winter Olympic Games in Vancouver, Canada 2010.
