= Li Guangxu =

Chinese alpine skier (born 1985)

Personal information
- Nationality: Chinese
- Born: 11 November 1985 (age 39); Heilongjiang, China

Sport
- Sport: Alpine skiing

Li Guangxu (Chinese: 李光旭; pinyin: Lǐ Guāngxù; born 11 November 1985) is a Chinese alpine skier. He competed in two events at the 2006 Winter Olympics.

At the 2009 Winter Universiade, he was the best-performing Chinese competitor in the men's giant slalom, coming in 46th place.

He later became a skiing coach.
