= Aleksandar Vitanov =

Bulgarian footballer

Aleksandar Vitanov Александър Витанов
Personal information
- Full name: Aleksandar Adrianov Vitanov
- Date of birth: 3 April 1990 (age 36)
- Place of birth: Plovdiv, Bulgaria
- Height: 1.86 m (6 ft 1 in)
- Position: Goalkeeper

Youth career
- Spartak Plovdiv

Senior career*
| Years | Team | Apps | (Gls) |
| 2011–2013 | Spartak Plovdiv | 80 | (0) |
| 2014–2016 | Lokomotiv Plovdiv | 15 | (0) |
| 2016 | Oborishte | 10 | (0) |
- * Club domestic league appearances and goals as of 15:22, 8 January 2017 (UTC)

Aleksandar Adrianov Vitanov (Bulgarian: Александър Адрианов Витанов; born 3 April 1990) is a Bulgarian footballer who plays as a goalkeeper.

Vitanov signed for Lokomotiv from Spartak Plovdiv in February 2014.
