= Márton Bene =

Hungarian alpine skier (born 1986)

Márton Bene (born 1 October 1986) is an alpine skier from Hungary. He competed for Hungary at the 2010 Winter Olympics. His best result was a 71st place in the giant slalom.
