= Abraham Sarkakhyan =

Armenian alpine skier (born 1986)

Personal information
- Nationality: Armenian
- Born: 23 June 1986 (age 38); Tsaghkadzor, Soviet Union

Sport
- Sport: Alpine skiing

Abraham Sarkakhyan (born 23 June 1986) is an Armenian alpine skier. He competed in the men's slalom at the 2006 Winter Olympics.
