= Jaba Gelashvili =

Georgian alpine skier (born 1993)

Jaba Gelashvili (born March 7, 1993) is an alpine skier from Georgia. He competed for Georgia at the 2010 Winter Olympics. His best result was a 50th place finish in the giant slalom.
