= Pol Carreras =

Spanish alpine skier (born 1990)

Personal information
- Born: 17 January 1990 (age 36) Barcelona, Spain
Medal record
Alpine skiing
Representing Spain

Pol Carreras (born 17 January 1990 in Barcelona) is an alpine skier from Spain. He competed for Spain at the 2014 Winter Olympics in the slalom and giant slalom.

== Olympic results ==
Season	Date	Location	Discipline	Place
2014	19 Feb 2014	(Russia) Sochi, Rusia	Giant Slalom	DNF1
2014	22 Feb 2014	(Russia) Sochi, Rusia	Slalom	DNF1
