= Danko Marinelli =

Croatian alpine skier (born 1987)

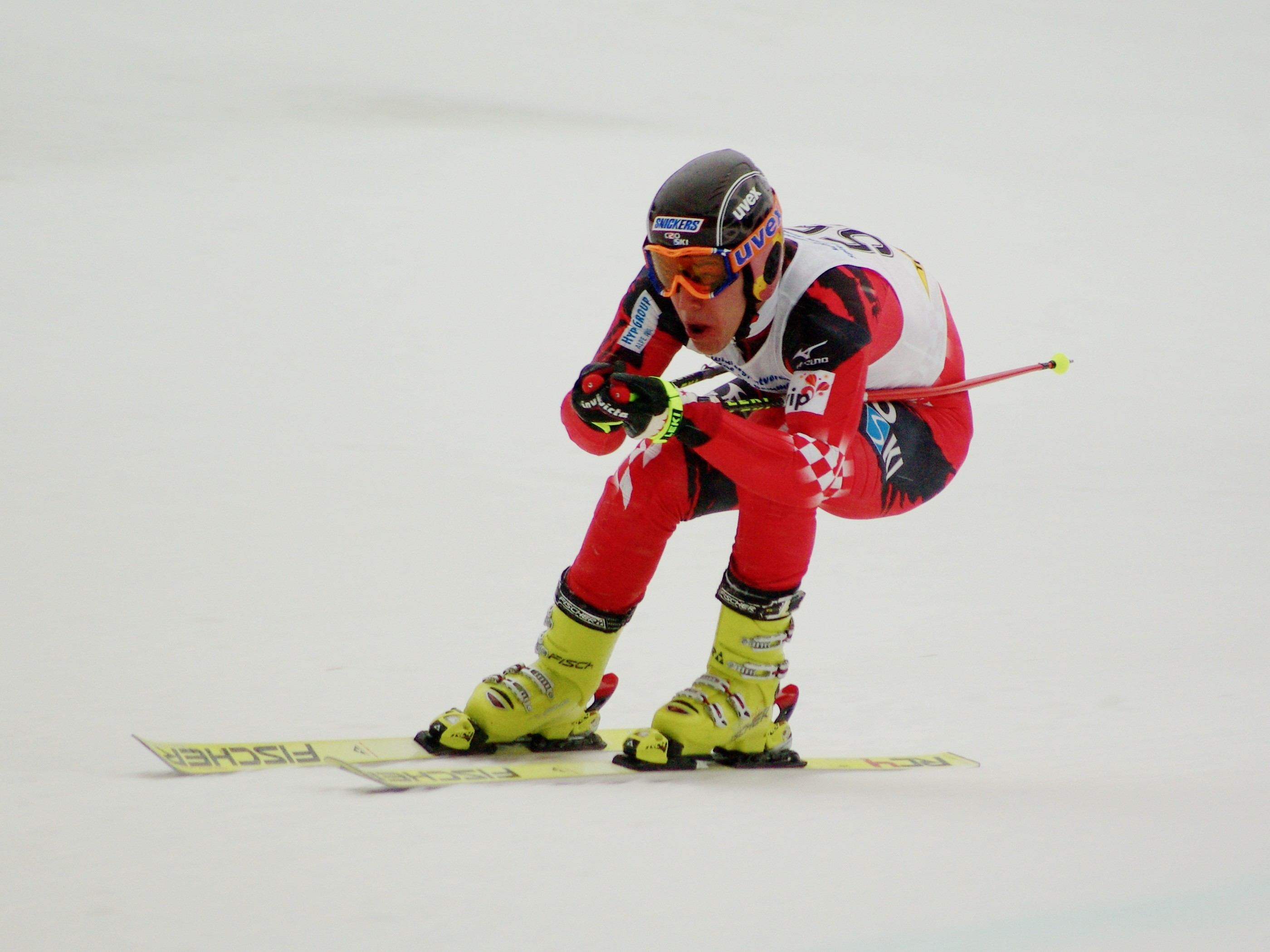
Marinelli in 2008

Danko Marinelli (born 30 May 1987 in Rijeka, SR Croatia, SFR Yugoslavia) is an alpine skier from Croatia. He competed for Croatia at the 2006 Olympics and the 2010 Olympics. His best result was a 32nd in the slalom in 2010.
