= Mykhaylo Renzhyn =

Israeli alpine skier (born 1978)

Personal information
- Native name: מיכאל רנזין
- Born: October 15, 1978 (age 48) Sigulda, Latvian SSR, Soviet Union
- Height: 182 cm (6 ft 0 in)
- Weight: 78 kg (172 lb)

Sport
- Sport: Alpine skiing
- Club: Israel Ski Club
- Team: Israel National Alpine Ski Team

Achievements and titles
- Olympic finals: Torino 2006; Vancouver 2010

Mykhaylo Renzhyn (born October 15, 1978), also known as Mikail Renzhin (Hebrew: מיכאל רנזין), is a Ukrainian-Israeli Alpine skier. Renzhyn competed in the 2006 Winter Olympics and also represented Israel at the 2010 Winter Olympics after having represented Ukraine until 2001.
