= Deyan Todorov =

Bulgarian alpine skier (born 1983)

Personal information
- Nationality: Bulgarian
- Born: 29 January 1983 (age 42); Sofia, Bulgaria

Sport
- Sport: Alpine skiing

Deyan Todorov (Bulgarian: Деян Тодоров; born 29 January 1983) is a Bulgarian alpine skier. He competed in the men's slalom at the 2006 Winter Olympics.
