= Deyvid Oprja =

Estonian alpine skier (born 1982)

Deyvid Oprja (born 17 February 1982 in Tallinn) is an Estonian alpine skier. He represented Estonia at the 2006 Winter Olympics in Turin and at the 2010 Winter Olympics in Vancouver.
