= Urs Imboden =

Swiss-Moldovan alpine skier (born 1975)

Personal information
- Nationality: Switzerland; Moldova
- Born: January 7, 1975 (age 51) Santa Maria Val Müstair, Graubünden, Switzerland
- Height: 182 cm (72 in)
- Weight: 76 kg (168 lb)

Sport
- Sport: Alpine skiing

Urs Imboden (born January 7, 1975, in Santa Maria Val Müstair, Switzerland) is an alpine skier. He had represented both Switzerland and Moldova in international skiing competitions. He competed as a part of the Switzerland team at the 2002 Winter Olympics. Later, he changed allegiance to Moldova, and represented the nation at the 2010 Winter Olympics. He retired from skiing in 2011 at the age of 36.

== Early life ==
Urs Imboden was born on 7 January 1975 at Santa Maria Val Müstair in Graubünden canton of Switzerland. He competed for Switzerland earlier and became a naturalized Molodovan citizen later.

== Career ==
Imboden started competing in international alpine skiing events in 1994 representing Switzerland. He achieved his first podium in the slalom event at the FIS championships held at Grindelwald in Switzerland in January 1997. Subsequently, he registered first place finishes in three FIS championship events held at Chateau d'Ox, Villars, and Lenzerheide in Switzerland in March-April of the same year. He continued to represent Switzerland in various FIS competitions including the FIS Alpine Ski World Cup and European Cup tournaments.

In January 2001, Imboden took part in his first FIS Alpine World Ski Championships. He was named in the Swiss team for the 2002 Winter Olympics held at Salt Lake City. He achieved a fifth-place finish in the slalom event at the Olympics. He completed his first run in 49.61 seconds, and his second run in 52.87 seconds. With a combined time of 1:42.48, he finished 1.42 seconds behind gold medal winner Jean-Pierre Vidal. He continued competing in various FIS events after the Olympics, earning multiple medals including a first place finish at the 2002 European Cup.

In 2006, after a series of declining results he lost his place in the Swiss team. In February 2007, Imboden competed in the FIS Alpine World Ski Championships representing Moldova. Imboden was named to the Moldovan team for the 2010 Winter Olympics held at Vancouver. He failed to finish the first run of the slalom event at the Olympics. In April 2011, Imboden announced his retirement after the governing body FIS amended the rules governing the nationality of the participants. He planned to take up coaching in his native Switzerland.
