= Christophe Roux =

Moldovan alpine skier

Personal information
- Nationality: Moldova
- Born: July 27, 1983 (age 42) Verbier, Valais, Switzerland
- Height: 183 cm (72 in)
- Weight: 78 kg (172 lb)

Sport
- Sport: Alpine skiing

Christophe Roux (born 27 July 1983 in Verbier) is a Moldovan alpine skier. He represented Moldova at the 2010 Winter Olympics.

== Early life ==
Christophe Roux was born on 27 July 1983 at Verbier in Valais canton of Switzerland. He became a naturalized Molodovan citizen later.

== Career ==
Roux started competing in international alpine skiing events in 1998 representing Switzerland. He finished second in the giant slalom event at the FIS championships held at Chapelco in Argentina in August 2002. He continued to participate in various alpine skiing events including FIS championships and South American cup competitions representing Switzerland from 2002 to 2006. He achieved a top three finish in the FIS championships at Megeve in February 2005 in the downhill skiing event, and in the FIS championships at Les Bugnenets in February 2006 in the giant slalom event. He won his first gold medal in the slalom events at the FIS championships at Arolla in March 2006. He was part of the Swiss trio that took all the podium places along with Manuel Paris and Thomas Sax.

In February 2007, Roux competed in the FIS Alpine World Ski Championships representing Moldova. He took part in five individual events in the competition and achieved a best place finish of eighth in the giant slalom event. He continued to represent Moldova in various skiing events from 2007. He achieved a first place finish in the FIS National Championships in Chapelco in August 2007, in the FIS National Championships in Thyon and December 2007. Though he qualified for the FIS Alpine Ski World Cup in 2008, he did not complete any of the three events he competed in. Later, he competed in the FIS Alpine World Ski Championships 2009 in the slalom event.

In March-April 2009, Roux achieved multiple podium finishes across three FIS events. Roux was named to the Moldovan team for the 2010 Winter Olympics held at Vancouver. In the giant slalom event, Roux completed his first run in 1:22.70. He took slightly longer to complete the course in the second run at 1:24.42. With a combined time of 2:47.12, he finished 44th amongst 89 competitors in the overall classification. In the slalom event, Roux recorded a time of 51.90 seconds over the 610 m (2,000 ft) course in his first run, and crossed the finish with a time of 53.85 seconds in his second run. He was ranked 28th amongst the 101 competitors in the event.
