= Bernard Vajdič =

Slovenian alpine skier (born 1980)

Bernard Vajdič (born 18 September 1980 in Celje) is a Slovenian alpine skier.

Vajdič represented Slovenia at the 2006 and 2010 Winter Olympics. He specializes in the slalom discipline of his sport, but he also competes in giant slalom.

Bernard Vajdič currently resides in Ljubljana, Slovenia.
