= Benjamin Griffin (alpine skier) =

New Zealand alpine skier (born 1986)

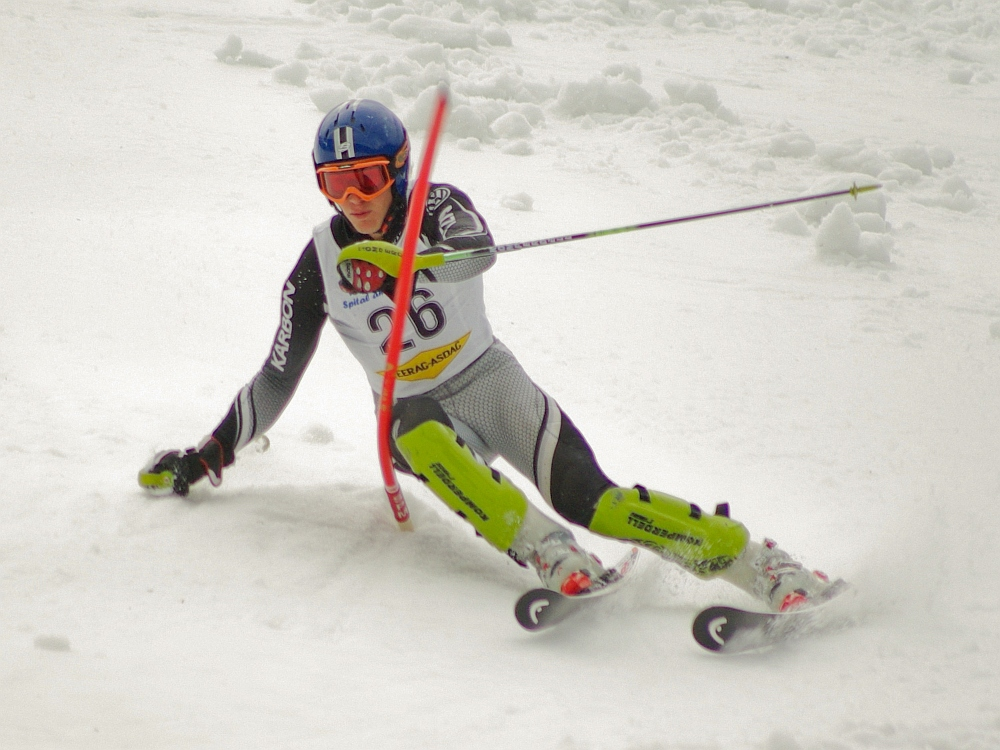
Griffin in 2008

Benjamin Griffin (born 22 September 1986), also known as Ben Griffin, is an alpine skier from New Zealand. He competed for New Zealand at the 2010 Winter Olympics in Giant Slalom and Super G where he failed to finish the first run of either event.

Griffin was brought up around Mt Ruapehu where his father was manager of the iconic chateau hotel. As a result, learnt to ski from the age of 3. Griffin begun ski racing within the Whakapapa Ski racing team. He was later selected for the New Zealand National ski racing team along with other Whakapapa ski racers such as Angus Howden and Sarah Jarvis.

Griffin's career highlights include 14-point FIS results in a Giant Slalom Nor-Am event in 2008. Ben was the 2007, 2009 and 2010 New Zealand GS national champion as well as the Super G national champion in 2006, 2007, 2009.

Griffin broke his neck in preparation for the New Zealand ski season in 2008. As a result, Griffin missed the entire New Zealand ski season. Griffin commenced an impressive come back in late March 2009, recording a 4th-place finish in the French Giant Slalom national championships at Meribel.

Griffin has a career high world ranking of 123 in Giant Slalom in the 2010/11 FIS race season.

Griffin had a reasonably serious hand injury resulting from a crash in the German National championships in April 2011. This necessitated surgery in Auckland in May–June 2011. It is unknown what the recovery period will be and when he will return to training and competitive ski racing in the 2011 New Zealand winter season.

Ben Griffin missed selection for the New Zealand Winter Olympic squad competing in Sochi, Russia in 2014. He subsequently retired having won 12 New Zealand national titles, 7 ANC titles, 6 FIS races and having been on the podium at 24 FIS races around the world. He also represented New Zealand at 3 World Championships, 10 World Cups, and the 2010 Vancouver Olympics. He has taken up a position as a ski racing coach for Team Hutt-based out of Mt Hutt.
