= Jeroen Van den Bogaert =

Belgian alpine skier (born 1979)

Jeroen Van den Bogaert (born 16 March 1979 in Deurne, Belgium) is an alpine skier from Belgium. He competed for Belgium at the 2010 Winter Olympics finishing 34th in the slalom.
