= Vitalijus Rumiancevas =

Lithuanian alpine skier (born 1985)

Vitalijus Rumiancevas (born March 15, 1985) is an alpine skier from Lithuania. He competed for Lithuania at the 2006 Olympics and the 2010 Olympics. His best result is a 44th place in the slalom in 2006.
