= Želimir Vuković =

Serbian alpine skier (born 1983)

Želimir Vuković (Serbian Cyrillic: Желимир Вуковић; born April 29, 1983) is a Serbian alpine skier. He is a member of Radnički skiing club.

He represented Serbia and Montenegro at the 2006 Winter Olympics in Men's Slalom.

Vuković was a Serbian flag bearer at the 2007 Winter Universiade in Turin, Italy.
