= Ivan Heimschild =

Slovak alpine skier (born 1980)

Medal record

Alpine skiing

Representing Slovakia

Winter Universiade
| Bronze medal – third place | 2003 Tarvisio | Super-G |

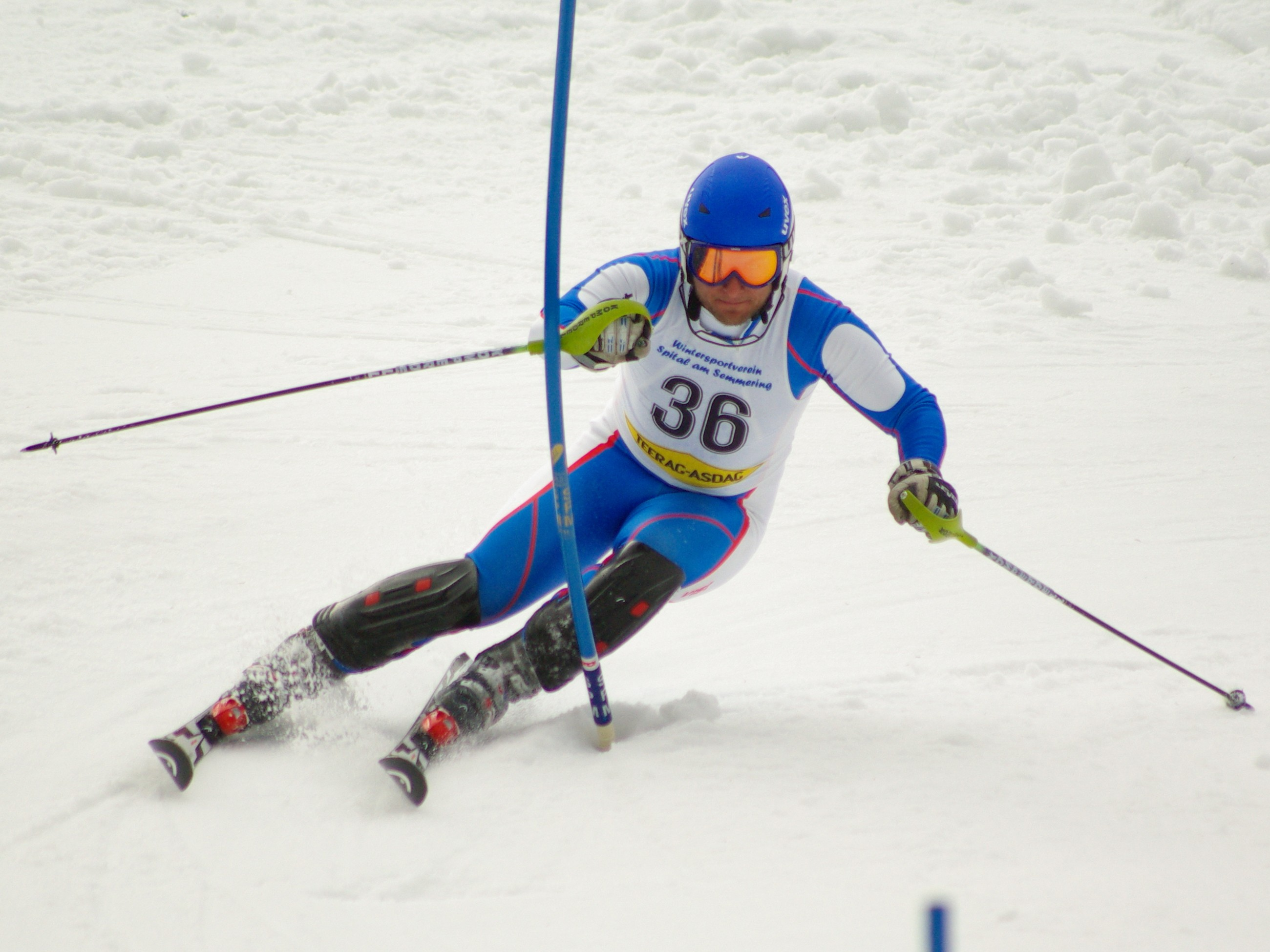
Ivan Heimschild in 2008

Ivan Heimschild (born 5 March 1980 in Martin) is a Slovak former alpine skier who competed in the 2002 Winter Olympics and in the 2006 Winter Olympics.
