= Ioan-Gabriel Nan =

Romanian alpine skier (born 1980)

Ioan-Gabriel Nan (born 3 September 1980) is an alpine skier from Romania. He competed for Romania at the 2010 Winter Olympics. His best result was a 49th place in the giant slalom.
