= Bart Mollin =

Belgian alpine skier (born 1981)

Bart Mollin (born 6 March 1981) is an alpine skier from Belgium. He competed for Belgium at the 2010 Winter Olympics where he failed to finish the first run of the slalom.
