= Erdinç Türksever =

Turkish alpine skier (born 1985)

Erdinç Türksever (born 30 November 1985) is an alpine skier from Turkey. He competed for Turkey at the 2010 Winter Olympics and in 2011 World Alpine Ski Championships in Garmisch-Partenkirchen. He finished the Giant Slalom 65th. Despite not finishing the qualification race for the slalom, he was reprieved as Turkey's representative for the final race, and managed to finish it 48th out of 78 classed competitors.
