= Arsen Nersisyan =

Armenian alpine skier (born 1987)

Arsen Nersisyan (born 18 July 1987) is an alpine skier from Armenia. He competed for Armenia at the 2010 Winter Olympics in the slalom and giant slalom. Nersisyan was Armenia's flag bearer during the 2010 Winter Olympics opening ceremony.
