= Björgvin Björgvinsson (skier) =

Icelandic alpine skier (born 1980)

Björgvin Björgvinsson (born 11 January 1980, in Dalvík) is an Icelandic alpine skier who competed for Iceland at the 2006 Winter Olympics. He speaks Icelandic and German. He also competed for Iceland at the 2010 Winter Olympics and was selected as his nation's flag bearer at the opening ceremony.
