= Kai Alaerts =

Belgian alpine skier (born 1989)

Personal information
- Nationality: Belgian
- Born: 6 September 1989 (age 35)

Sport
- Sport: Alpine skiing

Kai Alaerts (born 6 September 1989) is a Belgian alpine skier. He competed in the 2018 Winter Olympics.
