= Stepan Zuev =

Russian alpine skier (born 1988)

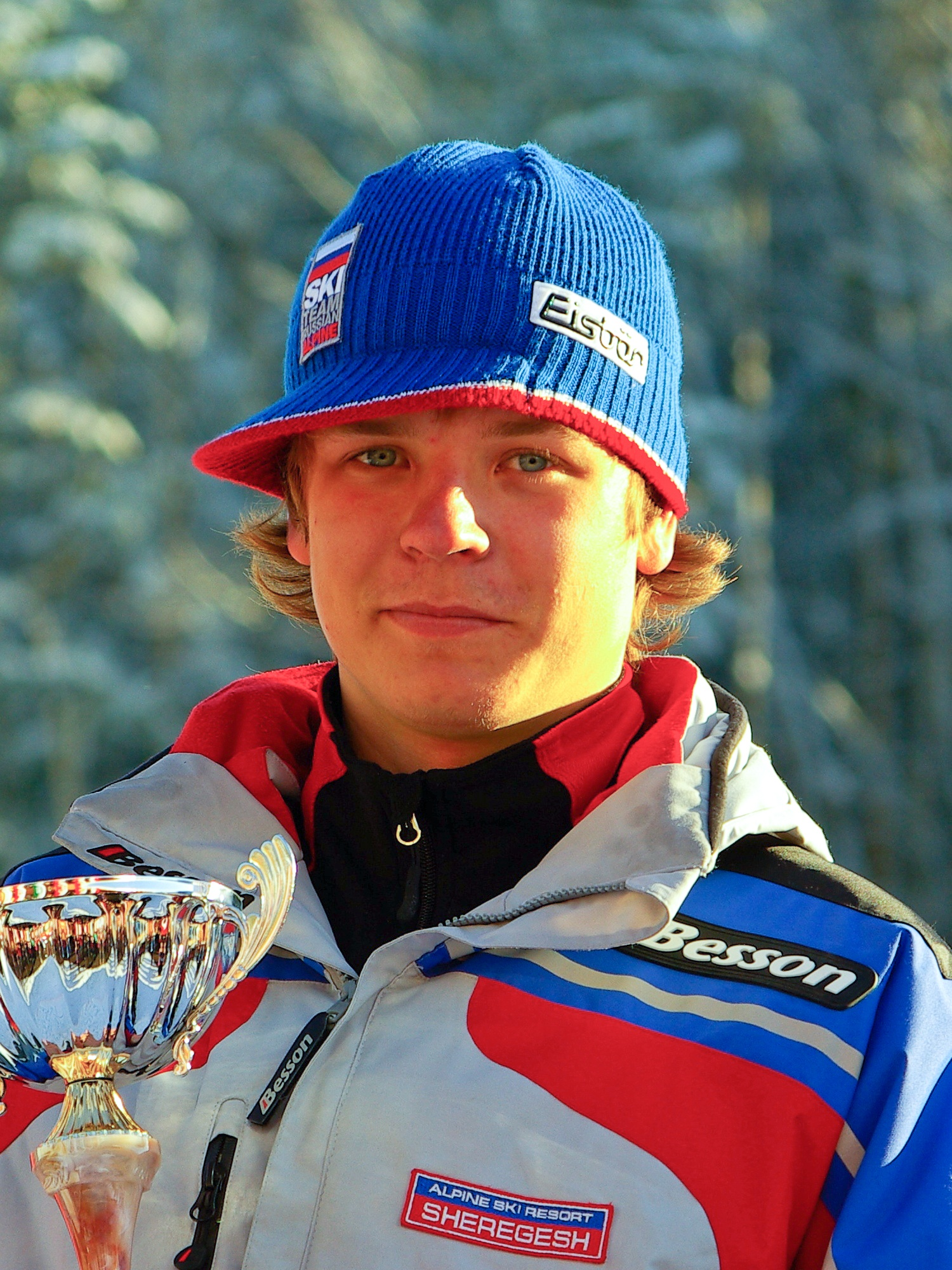
Stepan Zuyev during the award ceremony for the FIS-Slalom of the Austrian Junior Championships 2008.

Stephan Zuev (born 31 October 1988) is an alpine skier from Russia. He competed for Russia at the 2010 Winter Olympics.

His best result was a 23rd place in the combined.
