= Jhonatan Longhi =

Brazilian alpine skier (born 1988)

Personal information
- Born: February 2, 1988 (age 38) São Paulo, Brazil
- Height: 5 ft 9 in (175 cm)
- Weight: 172 lb (78 kg)

Sport
- Country: Brazil
- Sport: Alpine skiing
Medal record
Representing Brazil

Jhonatan Longhi (born February 2, 1988) is an alpine skier from Brazil. He competed for Brazil at the 2010 Winter Olympics. His best result was a 56th place in the giant slalom.
