= Naoki Yuasa =

Japanese alpine skier (born 1983)

Naoki Yuasa (湯浅 直樹, Yuasa Naoki, born 24 April 1983) is a World Cup alpine ski racer from Japan.

Yuasa made his World Cup debut in Shigakogen in 2003. He attained his first podium in World Cup in December 2012, a third place in slalom at Madonna di Campiglio, Italy. Yuasa represented Japan at the 2006 Winter Olympics, when he finished 7th in slalom.

== World Cup podiums ==
- 1 podium – (1 SL)

Season	Date	Location	Discipline	Place
2013	18 Dec 2012	Madonna di Campiglio, Italy	Slalom	3rd
