= Mario Matt =

Austrian alpine skier (born 1979)

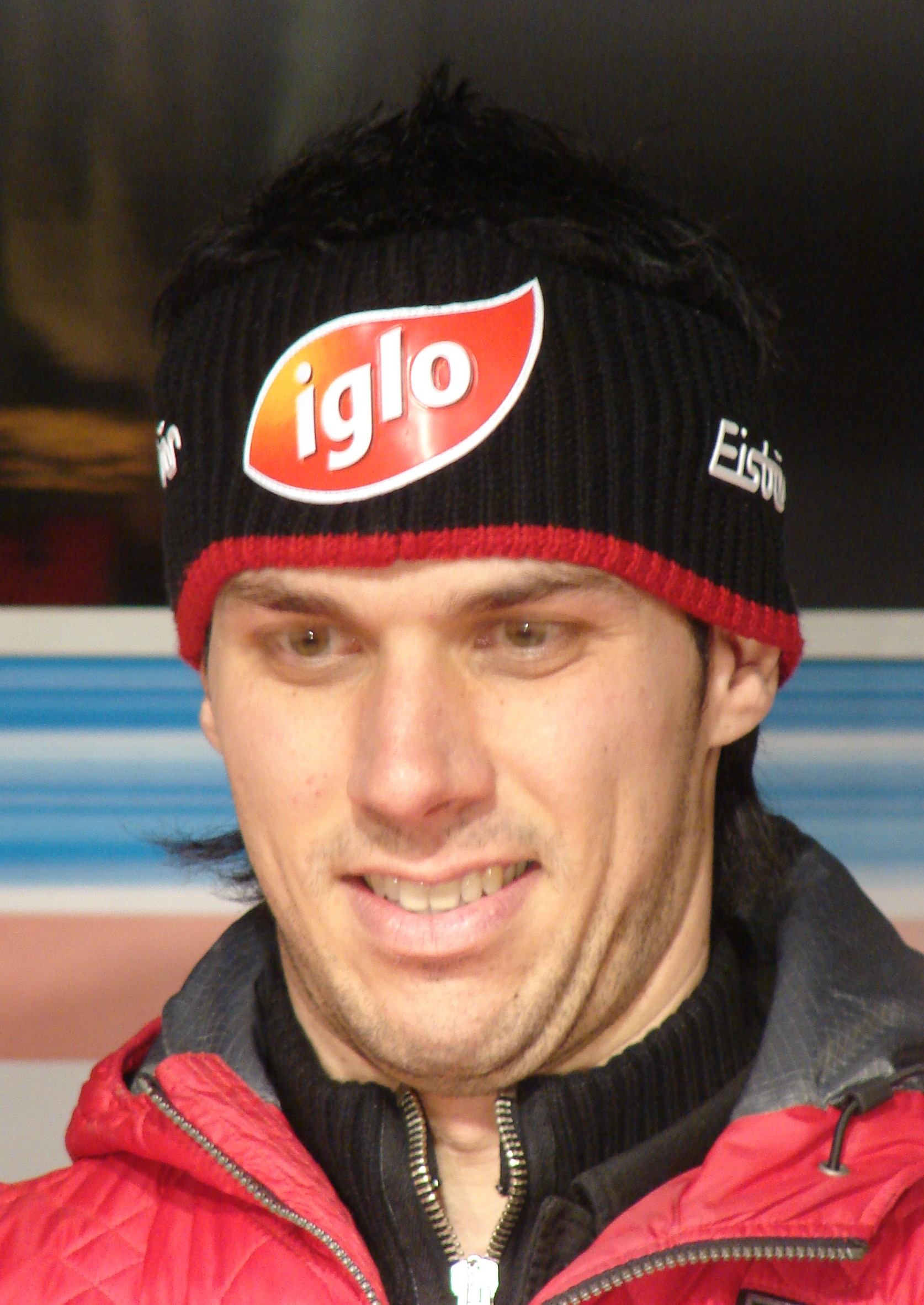
- Matt during January 2007 FIS Alpine Skiing World Cup competitions in Schladming, Styria, Austria

Personal information
- Born: 9 April 1979 (age 47) Zams, Tyrol, Austria
- Height: 190 cm (6 ft 3 in)
- Website: mariomatt.com

Skiing career
- Sport: Alpine skiing
- Club: SC Arlberg – Tirol
- Retired: 12 March 2015 (age 35)
- Disciplines: Slalom, giant slalom, combined
- World Cup debut: 21 December 1999 (age 20)

Olympics
- Teams: 2 – (2006, 2014)
- Medals: 1 (1 gold)

World Championships
- Teams: 8 – (2001–15)
- Medals: 5 (3 gold)

World Cup
- Seasons: 16 – (2000–15)
- Wins: 15 – (14 SL, 1 SC)
- Podiums: 42 – (1 GS, 40 SL, 1 SC)
- Overall titles: 0 – (5th in 2007)
- Discipline titles: 0 – (2nd in SL, 2007)
Medal record
Men's alpine skiing
Representing Austria
World Cup race podiums
| Event | 1st | 2nd | 3rd |
|---|---|---|---|
| Slalom | 14 | 11 | 15 |
| Giant slalom | 0 | 1 | 0 |
| Combined | 1 | 0 | 0 |
| Total | 15 | 12 | 15 |
Olympic Games
| Gold medal – first place | 2014 Sochi | Slalom |
World Championships
| Gold medal – first place | 2001 St. Anton | Slalom |
| Gold medal – first place | 2007 Åre | Slalom |
| Gold medal – first place | 2007 Åre | Team event |
| Silver medal – second place | 2001 St. Anton | Combined |
| Bronze medal – third place | 2013 Schladming | Slalom |
Junior World Ski Championships
| Silver medal – second place | 1998 Megève | Slalom |
| Silver medal – second place | 1999 Pra Loup | Combined |

Mario Matt (born 9 April 1979) is an Austrian former World Cup alpine ski racer and Olympic gold medalist.

== Slalom racing career ==
Born in Zams, Tyrol, Matt made his World Cup debut in December 1999. He claimed 15 World Cup victories: 14 in slalom and one super combined. Matt is also a two-time world champion in slalom, with titles in 2001 and 2007. With a remarkably long career as a top slalom racer, he is the second oldest (after André Myhrer, who won gold in 2018) to win an Olympic gold medal in slalom skiing (in Sochi at the 2014 Winter olympics) and also the second oldest (after Dave Ryding) to win a (regular) World Cup slalom race. Matt also has the third-longest time interval between first and last World Cup victories (13 years, 10 months, and 22 days), after Ingemar Stenmark and Didier Cuche.

Matt announced his retirement from ski racing on 12 March 2015.

=== World Cup results ===
==== Season standings ====
| Season | Age | Overall | Slalom | Giant slalom | Super-G | Downhill | Combined |
|---|---|---|---|---|---|---|---|
| 2000 | 20 | 23 | 4 | — | — | — | — |
| 2001 | 21 | 17 | 3 | — | — | — | — |
| 2002 | 22 | 29 | 8 | 37 | — | — | — |
| 2003 | 23 | 91 | 35 | — | — | — | — |
| 2004 | 24 | 23 | 6 | — | — | — | — |
| 2005 | 25 | 29 | 6 | — | — | — | — |
| 2006 | 26 | 36 | 16 | 23 | — | — | 32 |
| 2007 | 27 | 5 | 2 | 25 | — | — | 11 |
| 2008 | 28 | 10 | 4 | 15 | — | — | 29 |
| 2009 | 29 | 29 | 7 | 40 | — | — | — |
| 2010 | 30 | 85 | 31 | — | — | — | — |
| 2011 | 31 | 20 | 4 | — | — | — | — |
| 2012 | 32 | 28 | 7 | — | — | — | — |
| 2013 | 33 | 21 | 6 | — | — | — | — |
| 2014 | 34 | 27 | 6 | — | — | — | — |
| 2015 | 35 | 96 | 29 | — | — | — | — |

==== Race victories ====
- 15 wins – (14 SL, 1 SC)
- 42 podiums – (40 SL, 1 GS, 1 SC)

| Season | Date | Location | Discipline |
|---|---|---|---|
| 2000 | 23 Jan 2000 | Kitzbühel, Austria | Slalom |
| 2000 | 9 Mar 2000 | Schladming, Austria | Slalom |
| 2001 | 19 Dec 2000 | Madonna di Campiglio, Italy | Slalom |
| 2002 | 26 Nov 2001 | (United States) Aspen, USA | Slalom |
| 2005 | 13 Mar 2005 | Lenzerheide, Switzerland | Slalom |
| 2007 | 14 Jan 2007 | Wengen, Switzerland | Super combined |
| 2007 | 25 Feb 2007 | Garmisch, Germany | Slalom |
| 2007 | 4 Mar 2007 | Kranjska Gora, Slovenia | Slalom |
| 2008 | 6 Jan 2008 | Adelboden, Switzerland | Slalom |
| 2008 | 22 Jan 2008 | Schladming, Austria | Slalom |
| 2008 | 17 Feb 2008 | Zagreb, Croatia | Slalom |
| 2009 | 14 Mar 2009 | Åre, Sweden | Slalom |
| 2011 | 27 Feb 2011 | Bansko, Bulgaria | Slalom |
| 2011 | 6 Mar 2011 | Kranjska Gora, Slovenia | Slalom |
| 2014 | 15 Dec 2013 | Val d'Isère, France | Slalom |

=== World Championships results ===
| Year | Age | Slalom | Giant slalom | Super-G | Downhill | Combined |
|---|---|---|---|---|---|---|
| 2001 | 21 | 1 | — | — | — | 2 |
| 2003 | 23 | DNF1 | — | — | — | — |
| 2005 | 25 | DNF1 | — | — | — | 11 |
| 2007 | 27 | 1 | — | — | — | 11 |
| 2009 | 29 | DNF1 | — | — | — | — |
| 2011 | 31 | 4 | — | — | — | — |
| 2013 | 33 | 3 | — | — | — | — |
| 2015 | 35 | DNF1 | — | — | — | — |

=== Olympic results ===
| Year | Age | Slalom | Giant slalom | Super-G | Downhill | Combined |
|---|---|---|---|---|---|---|
| 2002 | 22 | injured: did not compete | | | | |
| 2006 | 26 | DNF1 | — | — | — | 34 |
| 2010 | 30 | — | — | — | — | — |
| 2014 | 34 | 1 | — | — | — | — |

== Business career ==
In 2009, Matt purchased the Krazy Kanguruh bar at the Arlberg resort St. Anton. He also runs a stable where he breeds Arabian horses.

== Personal ==
Matt is the brother of skicross competitor and Olympic silver winner Andreas Matt and fellow alpine skier Michael Matt.

== See also ==
- List of Olympic medalist families
