= Alpine skiing at the 2006 Winter Olympics – Men's combined =

Men's combined at the XX Olympic Winter Games
- Pictogram for alpine skiing
- Venue: Sestriere
- Date: February 14, 2006
- Competitors: 60 from 27 nations
- Winning time: 3:09.35

Medalists
1st place, gold medalist(s)		Ted Ligety	United States
2nd place, silver medalist(s)		Ivica Kostelić	Croatia
3rd place, bronze medalist(s)		Rainer Schönfelder	Austria

The men's combined was held on Tuesday, 14 February, two days after the downhill. The combined competition, as the name suggests, is a combination where the times in the downhill racing and the slalom events are added. One run of downhill and two runs of slalom are used to determine overall ranking in the combined event. All three runs were held in a single day.

Norway's Kjetil André Aamodt was defending Olympic champion from Salt Lake City in 2002, while Benjamin Raich of Austria was the reigning world champion. Raich led the Combined standings on the World Cup entering the Olympics, followed by Michael Walchhofer (Austria) and Bode Miller (USA) in a tie for second.

Miller, the leader after the downhill portion, was disqualified in the first slalom run for straddling a gate. This left Raich in the lead going into the final run of slalom, followed by Ivica Kostelić and young American Ted Ligety. Ligety scorched the final run for the gold medal, while Raich skied out. Aamodt did not start the event after a knee injury, and Filip Trejbal had to withdraw after a spectacular crash which delayed the event for a prolonged period.

These were the last Olympics to use the traditional combined format (one downhill run and two slalom runs). Starting in 2010, the Olympics are scheduled to switch to the "super-combined" format (one run each of downhill & slalom) for the combined event. First run on the World Cup circuit in 2005 at Wengen, the "super-combi" format was first used at the world championships in 2007.

== Results ==
The results of the men's combined event in Alpine skiing at the 2006 Winter Olympics.

Rank	Name	Country	Downhill	Slalom 1	Slalom 2	Time	Difference
1st place, gold medalist(s)	Ted Ligety	United States	1:41.42	44.09	43.84	3:09.35	+0.00
2nd place, silver medalist(s)	Ivica Kostelić	Croatia	1:40.44	44.61	44.83	3:09.88	+0.53
3rd place, bronze medalist(s)	Rainer Schönfelder	Austria	1:40.02	45.67	44.98	3:10.67	+1.32
4	Daniel Albrecht	Switzerland	1:40.47	45.31	44.95	3:10.73	+1.38
5	Giorgio Rocca	Italy	1:41.39	44.88	44.47	3:10.74	+1.39
6	Ondřej Bank	Czech Republic	1:40.50	45.34	45.16	3:11.00	+1.65
7	Marc Berthod	Switzerland	1:41.24	45.21	44.77	3:11.22	+1.87
8	Pierrick Bourgeat	France	1:41.35	45.56	44.38	3:11.29	+1.94
9	Peter Fill	Italy	1:39.22	47.46	45.53	3:12.21	+2.86
10	Kjetil Jansrud	Norway	1:41.55	46.02	44.75	3:12.32	+2.97
11	Markus Larsson	Sweden	1:41.22	46.38	44.74	3:12.34	+2.99
12	Martin Vráblík	Czech Republic	1:40.50	46.73	45.18	3:12.41	+3.06
13	Jean-Baptiste Grange	France	1:44.05	44.63	43.83	3:12.51	+3.16
14	Noel Baxter	Great Britain	1:42.26	45.64	44.89	3:12.79	+3.44
15	Aleš Gorza	Slovenia	1:41.31	46.44	45.16	3:12.91	+3.56
16	Scott Macartney	United States	1:40.06	46.82	46.17	3:13.05	+3.70
17	John Kucera	Canada	1:41.04	46.67	45.55	3:13.26	+3.91
18	Johan Brolenius	Sweden	1:43.56	45.20	44.51	3:13.27	+3.92
19	Andrej Jerman	Slovenia	1:40.62	46.91	46.27	3:13.80	+4.45
20	Kryštof Krýzl	Czech Republic	1:41.47	46.62	46.09	3:14.18	+4.83
21	François Bourque	Canada	1:40.50	47.52	46.23	3:14.25	+4.90
22	Aleksandr Khoroshilov	Russia	1:42.35	46.92	46.19	3:15.46	+6.11
23	Cristian Javier Simari Birkner	Argentina	1:43.93	45.89	46.72	3:16.54	+7.19
24	Pavel Chestakov	Russia	1:40.41	49.11	47.32	3:16.84	+7.49
25	Ivan Heimshild	Slovakia	1:43.12	48.13	47.16	3:18.41	+9.06
26	Tin Široki	Croatia	1:44.75	47.40	48.01	3:20.16	+10.81
27	Jaroslav Babušiak	Slovakia	1:43.32	48.86	48.60	3:20.78	+11.43
28	Roger Vidosa	Andorra	1:46.09	48.23	47.05	3:21.37	+12.02
29	Steve Nyman	United States	1:40.19	47.14	55.35	3:22.68	+13.33
30	Andrej Šporn	Slovenia	1:39.67	46.20	57.66	3:23.53	+14.18
31	Mihail Sediankov	Bulgaria	1:46.10	49.11	48.69	3:23.90	+14.55
32	Claudio Sprecher	Liechtenstein	1:41.01	51.77	51.30	3:24.08	+14.73
33	Natko Zrnčić-Dim	Croatia	1:41.23	56.55	46.37	3:24.15	+14.80
34	Mario Matt	Austria	1:41.08	45.60	1:02.10	3:28.78	+19.43
35	Florentin-Daniel Nicolae	Romania	1:45.81	53.39	52.69	3:31.89	+22.54
	Manuel Osborne-Paradis	Canada	1:39.69	50.11	DNS		
	Benjamin Raich	Austria	1:40.42	44.23	DNF		
	Anton Konovalov	Russia	1:45.12	56.15	DNF		
	Ivan Ratkić	Croatia	1:44.71	48.48	DNF		
	Nikolay Skriabin	Ukraine	1:46.63	51.21	DNF		
	Renārs Doršs	Latvia	1:44.54	52.55	DNF		
	Jorge Mandrú	Chile	1:45.81	52.92	DSQ		
	Konstantin Sats	Russia	1:41.02	DNS			
	Aksel Lund Svindal	Norway	1:39.26	DNF			
	Silvan Zurbriggen	Switzerland	1:41.08	DNF			
	Michael Walchhofer	Austria	1:39.52	DNF			
	Ryan Semple	Canada	1:41.65	DNF			
	Lasse Kjus	Norway	1:39.63	DNF			
	Michał Kałwa	Poland	1:42.72	DNF			
	Stefan Georgiev	Bulgaria	1:43.86	DNF			
	Didier Défago	Switzerland	1:38.68	DNF			
	Alex Antor	Andorra	1:43.84	DNF			
	Sindri M. Pálsson	Iceland	1:46.04	DNF			
	Alexander Heath	South Africa	1:47.62	DNF			
	Patrick Staudacher	Italy	1:40.52	DNF			
	Bode Miller	United States	1:38.36	DSQ			
	Nikolai Hentsch	Brazil	1:45.42	DSQ			
	Kjetil André Aamodt	Norway	DNS				
	Filip Trejbal	Czech Republic	DNF				
	Jono Brauer	Australia	DNF				
