= Alpine skiing at the 2006 Winter Olympics – Men's super-G =

Men's super-G at the XX Olympic Winter Games
- Pictogram for alpine skiing
- Venue: Sestriere
- Date: February 18, 2006
- Competitors: 63 from 27 nations
- Winning time: 1:30.65

Medalists
1st place, gold medalist(s)		Kjetil André Aamodt	Norway
2nd place, silver medalist(s)		Hermann Maier	Austria
3rd place, bronze medalist(s)		Ambrosi Hoffmann	Switzerland

Men's Super-G
- Interactive map of Men's Super-G
- Location: Sestriere; Kandahar Banchetta
- Vertical: 650 m (2,133 ft)
- Top elevation: 2,536 m (8,320 ft)
- Base elevation: 1,886 m (6,188 ft)

The Men's Super-G competition of the Torino 2006 Olympics was held at Sestriere, Italy, on Saturday, February 18.

In super-G competitions, skiers must navigate between gates at high speed, and the gates are further apart than in slalom and giant slalom competitions. As in the downhill, there is only one run of the super-G.

The defending World Cup and world champion in super-G was Bode Miller of the United States, Austria's Hermann Maier led the current season and won the Olympic gold medal in 1998; the defending Olympic champion was Kjetil André Aamodt of Norway.

Aamodt won the gold medal again, Maier took the silver, and the bronze medalist was Ambrosi Hoffmann of Switzerland; Miller did not finish. Through 2018, this is the only successful Olympic title defense in a men's alpine speed event. It was Aamodt's third victory in the Olympic super-G (1992, 2002, 2006) and eighth Olympic medal.

Held on the Kandahar Banchetta piste, the course started at an elevation of 2,536 m (8,320 ft) above sea level with a vertical drop of 650 m (2,133 ft) and a course length of 2.325 km (1.44 mi). Aamodt's winning time of 90.65 seconds yielded an average course speed of 92.333 km/h (57.4 mph), with an average vertical descent rate of 7.170 m/s (23.5 ft/s).

== Results ==
The race was started at 14:45 local time, (UTC+1). At the starting gate, the sky was mostly cloudy, the temperature was −6.5 °C (20 °F), and the snow condition was packed; the temperature at the finish was −0.5 °C (31 °F).

Rank	Bib	Name	Country	Time	Difference
1st place, gold medalist(s)	25	Kjetil André Aamodt	Norway	1:30.65	—
2nd place, silver medalist(s)	30	Hermann Maier	Austria	1:30.78	+0.13
3rd place, bronze medalist(s)	22	Ambrosi Hoffmann	Switzerland	1:30.98	+0.33
4	27	Erik Guay	Canada	1:31.08	+0.43
5	28	Aksel Lund Svindal	Norway	1:31.10	+0.45
6	19	Marco Büchel	Liechtenstein	1:31.22	+0.57
7	15	Scott Macartney	United States	1:31.23	+0.58
8	16	François Bourque	Canada	1:31.27	+0.62
9	29	Daron Rahlves	United States	1:31.37	+0.72
10	26	Hannes Reichelt	Austria	1:31.39	+0.74
11	9	Antoine Dénériaz	France	1:31.49	+0.84
12	12	Didier Cuche	Switzerland	1:31.50	+0.85
13	18	Peter Fill	Italy	1:31.54	+0.89
14	14	Lasse Kjus	Norway	1:31.79	+1.14
15	33	Andrej Šporn	Slovenia	1:31.84	+1.19
16	20	Didier Défago	Switzerland	1:31.90	+1.25
17	11	Patrick Staudacher	Italy	1:31.91	+1.26
18	17	Bruno Kernen	Switzerland	1:31.95	+1.30
19	21	Christoph Gruber	Austria	1:32.00	+1.35
20	3	Manuel Osborne-Paradis	Canada	1:32.02	+1.37
21	24	Benjamin Raich	Austria	1:32.05	+1.40
22	7	John Kucera	Canada	1:32.10	+1.45
22	4	Finlay Mickel	Great Britain	1:32.10	+1.45
24	13	Patrik Järbyn	Sweden	1:32.21	+1.56
24	2	Yannick Bertrand	France	1:32.21	+1.56
26	10	Bjarne Solbakken	Norway	1:32.90	+2.25
27	46	Konstantin Sats	Russia	1:33.14	+2.49
28	37	Andrej Jerman	Slovenia	1:33.20	+2.55
29	40	Pavel Chestakov	Russia	1:33.48	+2.83
29	31	Massimiliano Blardone	Italy	1:33.48	+2.83
31	35	Ivica Kostelić	Croatia	1:33.53	+2.88
32	32	Petr Záhrobský	Czech Republic	1:33.70	+3.05
33	47	Aleš Gorza	Slovenia	1:33.77	+3.12
34	39	Kryštof Krýzl	Czech Republic	1:34.20	+3.55
35	38	Natko Zrnčić -Dim	Croatia	1:34.49	+3.84
36	43	Ivan Ratkić	Croatia	1:34.77	+4.12
37	36	Roger Cruickshank	Great Britain	1:34.87	+4.22
38	41	Martin Vráblík	Czech Republic	1:34.90	+4.25
39	1	Gauthier de Tessières	France	1:34.94	+4.29
40	57	Jaroslav Babušiak	Slovakia	1:35.41	+4.76
41	52	Aleksandr Khoroshilov	Russia	1:35.51	+4.86
42	45	Anton Konovalov	Russia	1:35.72	+5.07
43	8	Steve Nyman	United States	1:36.22	+5.57
44	54	Duncan Grob	Chile	1:36.24	+5.59
45	53	Michał Kałwa	Poland	1:36.25	+5.60
46	44	Ivan Heimschild	Slovakia	1:36.58	+5.93
47	48	Maui Gayme	Chile	1:36.85	+6.20
48	59	Olivier Jenot	Monaco	1:37.03	+6.38
49	55	Ivan Olivari	Croatia	1:37.43	+6.78
50	58	Alexander Heath	South Africa	1:37.77	+7.12
51	60	Andrei Drygin	Tajikistan	1:37.85	+7.20
52	51	Ivars Ciaguns	Latvia	1:38.18	+7.53
53	56	Nikolay Skriabin	Ukraine	1:38.86	+8.21
54	50	Mikael Gayme	Chile	1:39.68	+9.03
55	63	Leyti Seck	Senegal	1:42.87	+12.22
56	62	Erjon Tola	Albania	1:44.27	+13.62
	5	A. J. Bear	Australia	DNF	
	6	Pierre-Emmanuel Dalcin	France	DNF	
	23	Bode Miller	United States	DNF	
	34	Claudio Sprecher	Liechtenstein	DNF	
	42	Ondřej Bank	Czech Republic	DNF	
	49	Alex Antor	Andorra	DNF	
	61	Nikolai Hentsch	Brazil	DNF	
