= Hermann Maier =

Austrian alpine skier (born 1972)

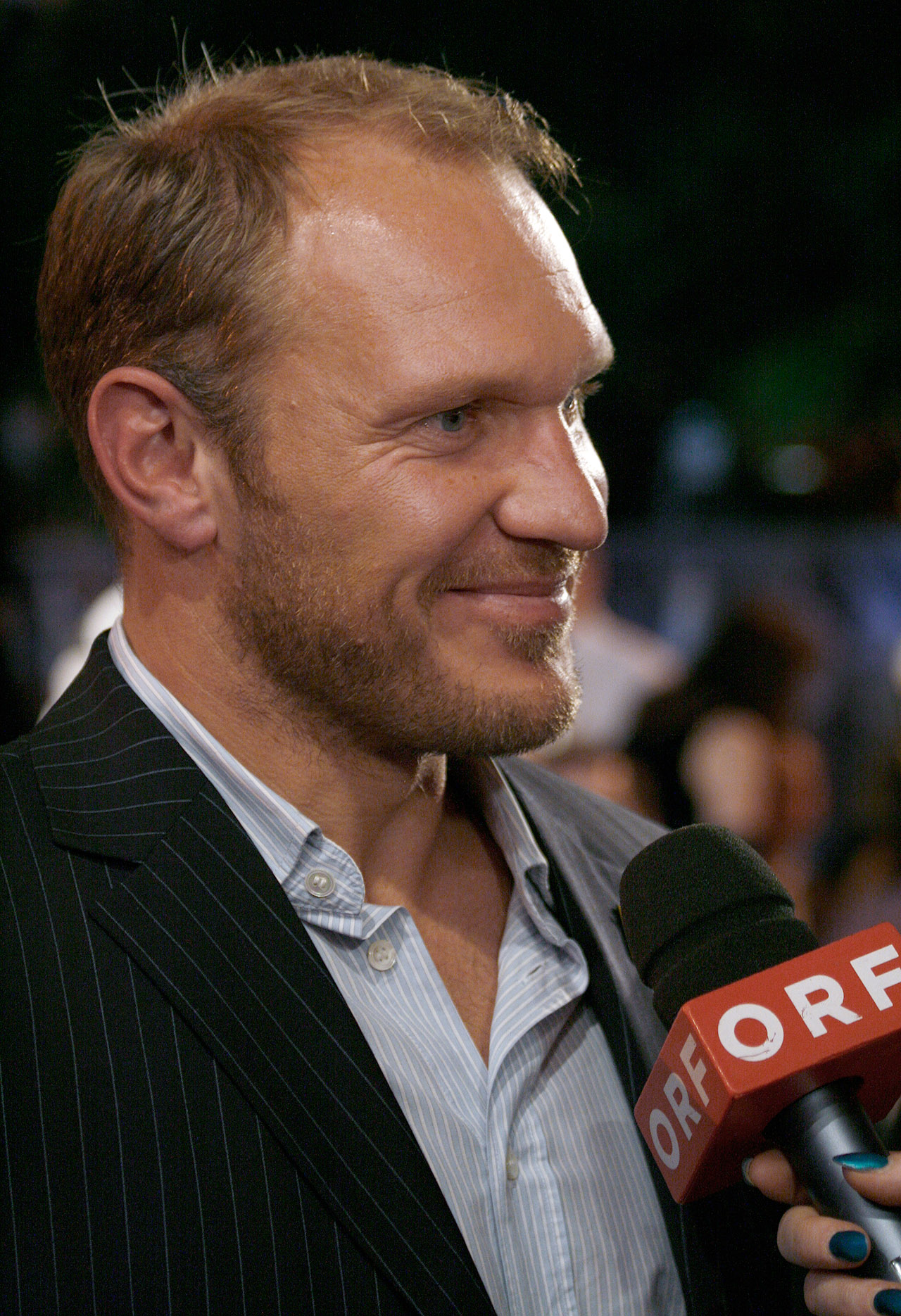
- Hermann Maier during the Austrian Sportspersonalities of the Year awards in November 2009.

Personal information
- Born: 7 December 1972 (age 53) Altenmarkt im Pongau, Salzburg, Austria
- Height: 1.81 m (5 ft 11 in)
- Website: hm1.com

Skiing career
- Sport: Alpine skiing
- Club: USC Flachau – Salzburg
- Retired: October 2009 (age 36)
- Disciplines: Downhill, super-G, giant slalom, combined
- World Cup debut: 10 February 1996 (age 23)

Olympics
- Teams: 2 (1998, 2006)
- Medals: 4 (2 gold)

World Championships
- Teams: 6 (1999–2009)
- Medals: 6 (3 gold)

World Cup
- Seasons: 12 (1997–2001, 2003-2009)
- Wins: 54
- Podiums: 96
- Overall titles: 4 (1998, 2000, 2001, 2004)
- Discipline titles: 10 (2 DH, 5 SG, 3 GS)
Medal record
International alpine ski competitions
| Event | 1st | 2nd | 3rd |
|---|---|---|---|
| Olympic Games | 2 | 1 | 1 |
| World Championships | 3 | 2 | 1 |
| Total | 5 | 3 | 2 |
World Cup race podiums
| Event | 1st | 2nd | 3rd |
|---|---|---|---|
| Slalom | 0 | 0 | 0 |
| Giant | 14 | 5 | 9 |
| Super-G | 24 | 10 | 4 |
| Downhill | 15 | 5 | 5 |
| Combined | 1 | 1 | 2 |
| Parallel | 0 | 0 | 1 |
| Total | 54 | 21 | 21 |
Olympic Games
| Gold medal – first place | 1998 Nagano | Super-G |
| Gold medal – first place | 1998 Nagano | Giant slalom |
| Silver medal – second place | 2006 Turin | Super-G |
| Bronze medal – third place | 2006 Turin | Giant slalom |
World Championships
| Gold medal – first place | 1999 Vail | Downhill |
| Gold medal – first place | 1999 Vail | Super-G |
| Gold medal – first place | 2005 Bormio | Giant slalom |
| Silver medal – second place | 2001 St. Anton | Downhill |
| Silver medal – second place | 2003 St. Moritz | Super-G |
| Bronze medal – third place | 2001 St. Anton | Super-G |

Hermann Maier (born 7 December 1972) is an Austrian former World Cup champion alpine ski racer and Olympic gold medalist. Nicknamed the "Herminator", Maier ranks among the greatest alpine ski racers in history, with four overall World Cup titles (1998, 2000, 2001, 2004), two Olympic gold medals (both in 1998), and three World Championship titles (1999: 2, and 2005). His 54 World Cup race victories – 24 super-G, 15 downhills, 14 giant slaloms, and 1 combined – rank third on the men's all-time list behind Ingemar Stenmark's 86 victories and Marcel Hirscher's 67 victories. Until 2023 he held the record for the most points in one season by a male alpine skier, with 2000 points from the 2000 season. From 2000 to 2013 he also held the title of most points in one season by any alpine skier, until Tina Maze scored 2414 points in the 2013 season.

== Early years ==
Maier did not initially enjoy much success in ski racing. As a 15-year-old at the Schladming ski academy, he was sent home after being told he would not succeed because of his slight build, caused by growth impairments. He returned home to his hometown of Flachau and his father's ski school, which remains Maier's home. He took up work as a bricklayer in the summer and a ski instructor in the winter.

Participating in local races, Maier became a multiple regional champion in Salzburg and Tyrol, but still was not able to gain a spot in the strong Austrian World Cup ski team. Putting that behind him, his outstanding talent was recognized for the first time by Austrian coaches on 6 January 1996, when he was timed with the 12th fastest time in a World Cup giant slalom in Flachau, although only starting as a forerunner, not participating in the actual competition. This would become the starting point of his international career. Through his result in Flachau he gained the attention of the ÖSV (Austrian Ski Federation) and only two days later he started in his first Europa Cup race in Les Arcs and finished in second place. He won his next race at the same location the day after. Although the Europa Cup season started in mid December and he joined late, so he wasn't starting in all races, he won the overall Europa Cup title, as well as the season title in giant slalom.

== Ski career ==
Maier made his World Cup debut at age 23 on 10 February 1996, and finished 26th in the giant slalom at Hinterstoder, Austria. A year later in February 1997, he won his first World Cup event – a super-G race in Garmisch-Partenkirchen. He quickly established himself as an explosive and dynamic racer, well known for his strength, willingness to take risks, and strong work ethic.

Maier soon dominated alpine ski racing, winning the gold medal in the giant slalom and super-G at the 1998 Winter Olympics in Nagano, only a few days after a dramatic crash in the downhill race where he flew spectacularly off the sunlit course, landed partially on his head, tumbled head over heels several times, and crashed through two layers of B-netting. Despite the horrible look of the crash, Maier was able to walk out under his own power. That put him on the cover of Sports Illustrated magazine and made him a well known sportsman around the globe. Maier won the overall World Cup title in 1998, as well as the super-G and giant slalom season titles, and placed second in the downhill standings.

In 2000 he won the overall World Cup title, as well as the season titles in downhill, super-G, and giant slalom. He had a dominating performance, setting the then most point garnered by an alpine skier, of 2000 points. This record stood until Tina Maze scored 2,414 points in 2013.

He won the overall World Cup title in 2001, as well as that season's titles in downhill, super-G, and giant slalom. He won 13 World Cup races, but settled for two medals (silver and bronze) in the speed events at the 2001 World Championships in St. Anton. He was the reigning world champion in both events, won in 1999 at Beaver Creek, Colorado.

His racing career nearly ended following a near-fatal motorcycle accident on August 24, 2001; he collided with a car on his way home from a summer training session in Austria. Doctors nearly amputated his lower right leg, but instead Maier underwent massive reconstructive surgery. Most believed his racing career was over, and he had to sit out the 2002 season, missing the 2002 Winter Olympics in Salt Lake City. He returned to international competition in January 2003 in Adelboden, Switzerland, and two weeks later won a super-G title in the skiing-mecca of Kitzbühel, Austria.

In 2004, his first full season back, he reclaimed both the super-G and overall titles — the latter being his fourth — and received the Laureus World Sports Award for the "Comeback of the Year".

Reflecting his apparently indestructible nature, he is sometimes jocularly known as "The Herminator." After his 1998 Olympic gold medals in Nagano he also appeared on The Tonight Show with Jay Leno on NBC – together with Austrian-born actor Arnold Schwarzenegger, who is known worldwide as "The Terminator".

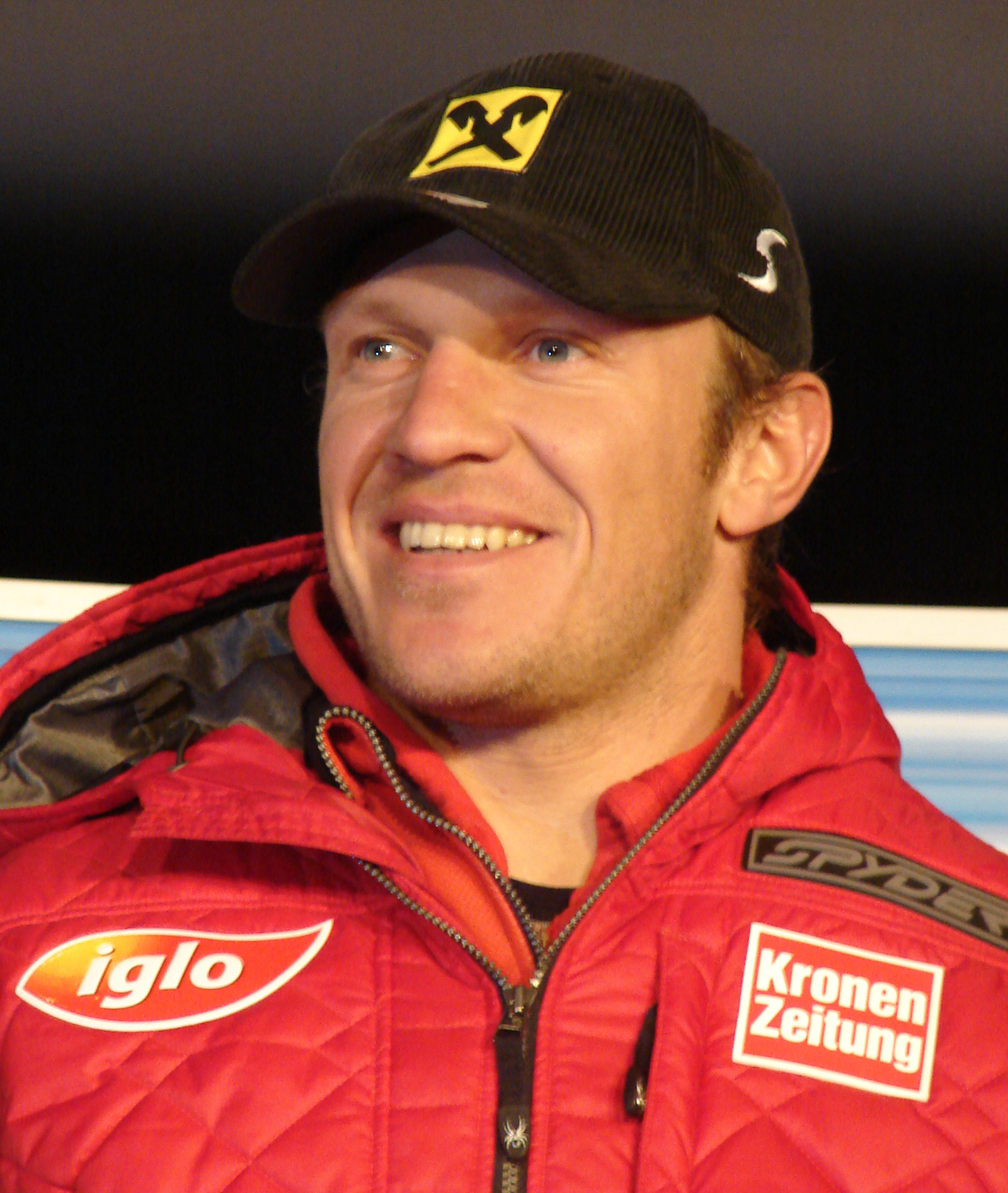
Maier, 2006

In 2004, Maier wrote an autobiography with his friend and former publicity agent, Knut Okresek. The book, Hermann Maier: Das Rennen meines Lebens (in German), dealt mainly with his recovery from the 2001 motorcycle accident. In 2005, VeloPress, a Boulder, Colorado-based publisher affiliated with Ski Racing magazine, acquired the worldwide English language rights to the book, which was published in time for the 2006 Olympics in Turin, Italy, as Hermann Maier: The Race of My Life.

In October 2005, he won the opening giant slalom in Sölden to amass 51 victories in the World Cup. This placed him fifth on the career victory list, behind Ingemar Stenmark, Lindsey Vonn, Annemarie Moser-Pröll, and Vreni Schneider.

On 20 June 2007, Maier announced he was switching to Head as his equipment sponsor, ending his long affiliation with Atomic. Also switching from Atomic to Head at this time were champions Bode Miller of the U.S. and Didier Cuche of Switzerland.

On 18 January 2008, Maier finished second in the Kitzbühel's super-G, behind Marco Büchel and in front of Didier Cuche for a total podium age of 104 years. His career results in the super-G races at Kitzbühel are the best in history (7 races: 5 wins and 2 second places). The following day, Maier finished fifth in the downhill. These were his best results of the 2008 season.

Maier won the first super-G of the 2009 season, held in Lake Louise, for his 24th super-G win. It was his 54th World Cup victory, but the first in nearly three years, and came a week before his 36th birthday. It was Maier's fourth victory in the super-G at Lake Louise, the last coming five years earlier.

Maier announced his retirement in 2009 after thirteen years of competing in the World Cup circuit.

== World Cup results ==
=== Season titles ===
- 14 total: 4 overall, 2 downhill, 5 super-G, 3 giant slalom

| Season | Discipline |
|---|---|
| 1998 | Overall |
| 1998 | Super-G |
| 1998 | Giant slalom |
| 1999 | Super-G |
| 2000 | Overall |
| 2000 | Downhill |
| 2000 | Super-G |
| 2000 | Giant slalom |
| 2001 | Overall |
| 2001 | Downhill |
| 2001 | Super-G |
| 2001 | Giant slalom |
| 2004 | Overall |
| 2004 | Super-G |

=== Season standings ===
| Season | Age | Overall | Slalom | Giant slalom | Super-G | Downhill | Combined |
|---|---|---|---|---|---|---|---|
| 1996 | 23 | 106 | — | 52 | 34 | — | — |
| 1997 | 24 | 21 | — | 15 | 4 | — | — |
| 1998 | 25 | 1 | 39 | 1 | 1 | 2 | 2 |
| 1999 | 26 | 3 | — | 3 | 1 | 6 | 6 |
| 2000 | 27 | 1 | — | 1 | 1 | 1 | 2 |
| 2001 | 28 | 1 | — | 1 | 1 | 1 | — |
| 2002 | 29 | injured in August 2001 in a motorcycle accident, out for entire season | | | | | |
| 2003 | 30 | 45 | — | — | 19 | 25 | — |
| 2004 | 31 | 1 | — | 17 | 1 | 3 | 10 |
| 2005 | 32 | 3 | — | 4 | 2 | 3 | 9 |
| 2006 | 33 | 6 | — | 8 | 2 | 7 | 42 |
| 2007 | 34 | 19 | — | 16 | 6 | 18 | — |
| 2008 | 35 | 21 | — | 30 | 10 | 16 | — |
| 2009 | 36 | 26 | — | — | 4 | 21 | — |

=== Race victories ===
- 54 wins: 15 downhill, 24 super-G, 14 giant slalom, 1 combined
- 96 podiums: 25 DH, 38 SG, 28 GS, 4 K, 1 parallel slalom

==== Downhill ====
- 15 wins
- 25 podiums

| Season | Date | Location |
|---|---|---|
| 1998 | 29 Dec 1997 | Bormio, Italy |
| 1998 | 16 Jan 1998 | Wengen, Switzerland |
| 1999 | 29 Dec 1998 | Bormio, Italy |
| 2000 | 27 Nov 1999 | Beaver Creek, USA |
| 2000 | 8 Jan 2000 | Chamonix, France |
| 2000 | 29 Jan 2000 | Garmisch, Germany |
| 2001 | 2 Dec 2000 | Beaver Creek, USA |
| 2001 | 9 Dec 2000 | Val d'Isère, France |
| 2001 | 20 Jan 2001 | Kitzbühel, Austria |
| 2001 | 2 Mar 2001 | Kvitfjell, Norway |
| 2001 | 8 Mar 2001 | Åre, Sweden |
| 2004 | 6 Dec 2003 | Beaver Creek, USA |
| 2004 | 14 Feb 2004 | St. Anton, Austria |
| 2005 | 5 Mar 2005 | Kvitfjell, Norway |
| 2006 | 28 Jan 2006 | Garmisch, Germany |

==== Giant slalom ====
- 14 wins
- 28 podiums

| Season | Date | Location |
|---|---|---|
| 1998 | 25 Nov 1997 | Park City, USA |
| 1998 | 6 Jan 1998 | Saalbach, Austria |
| 1998 | 13 Jan 1998 | Adelboden, Switzerland |
| 1999 | 25 Oct 1998 | Sölden, Austria |
| 1999 | 12 Jan 1999 | Adelboden, Switzerland |
| 2000 | 31 Oct 1999 | Tignes, France |
| 2000 | 24 Nov 1999 | Beaver Creek, USA |
| 2000 | 5 Feb 2000 | Todtnau, Germany |
| 2001 | 29 Oct 2000 | Sölden, Austria |
| 2001 | 10 Dec 2000 | Val d'Isère, France |
| 2001 | 9 Jan 2001 | Adelboden, Switzerland |
| 2001 | 15 Feb 2001 | Shiga Kōgen, Japan |
| 2001 | 10 Mar 2001 | Åre, Sweden |
| 2006 | 23 Oct 2005 | Sölden, Austria |

==== Super-G ====
- 24 wins
- 38 podiums

| Season | Date | Location |
|---|---|---|
| 1997 | 23 Feb 1997 | Garmisch, Germany |
| 1998 | 6 Dec 1997 | Beaver Creek, USA |
| 1998 | 10 Jan 1998 | Schladming, Austria |
| 1998 | 11 Jan 1998 | Schladming, Austria |
| 1998 | 1 Feb 1998 | Garmisch, Germany |
| 1999 | 13 Dec 1998 | Val d'Isère, France |
| 1999 | 21 Dec 1998 | Innsbruck, Austria |
| 1999 | 9 Jan 1999 | Schladming, Austria |
| 1999 | 7 Mar 1999 | Kvitfjell, Norway |
| 2000 | 28 Nov 1999 | Beaver Creek, USA |
| 2000 | 5 Dec 1999 | Lake Louise, Canada |
| 2000 | 21 Jan 2000 | Kitzbühel, Austria |
| 2000 | 16 Mar 2000 | Bormio, Italy |
| 2001 | 26 Nov 2000 | Lake Louise, Canada |
| 2001 | 19 Jan 2001 | Kitzbühel, Austria |
| 2001 | 4 Mar 2001 | Kvitfjell, Norway |
| 2003 | 27 Jan 2003 | Kitzbühel, Austria |
| 2004 | 30 Nov 2003 | Lake Louise |
| 2004 | 1 Feb 2004 | Garmisch, Germany |
| 2004 | 11 Mar 2004 | Sestriere, Italy |
| 2005 | 24 Jan 2005 | Kitzbühel, Austria |
| 2005 | 6 Mar 2005 | Kvitfjell, Norway |
| 2006 | 20 Jan 2006 | Kitzbühel, Austria |
| 2009 | 30 Nov 2008 | Lake Louise, Canada |

==== Combined ====
- 1 win
- 4 podiums

| Season | Date | Location |
|---|---|---|
| 1998 | 18 Jan 1998 | Veysonnaz, Switzerland |

== World Championship results ==
| Year | Age | Slalom | Giant Slalom | Super G | Downhill | Combined |
|---|---|---|---|---|---|---|
| 1999 | 26 | — | DNF2 | 1 | 1 | — |
| 2001 | 28 | — | 4 | 3 | 2 | — |
| 2003 | 30 | — | — | 2 | 8 | — |
| 2005 | 32 | — | 1 | 4 | 17 | — |
| 2007 | 34 | — | 21 | 7 | 13 | — |
| 2009 | 36 | — | — | 18 | 6 | — |

== Olympic results ==
| Year | Age | Slalom | Giant Slalom | Super G | Downhill | Combined |
|---|---|---|---|---|---|---|
| 1998 | 25 | — | 1 | 1 | DNF | — |
| 2006 | 33 | — | 3 | 2 | 6 | — |

== Besides skiing ==
Maier also won an all-around sports competition, the 2001 edition of the American Superstars competition and he frequently acts in TV adverts for his sponsor bank Raiffeisen. His brother, Alexander Maier, also represented Austria at the Winter Olympics. Maier rode the prologue of the 2003 Tour de France ahead of the main field, completing the 6.5 km individual time trial in 8 minutes 44 seconds, compared to 7 minutes 26 seconds for stage winner Bradley McGee and 8 minutes 26 seconds for the last cyclist.

== Video ==
- YouTube.com – Hahnenkamm (full course) – 9th place – 24 Jan 2004
- YouTube.com – 1998 Olympics – Nagano downhill (crash) & giant slalom (2nd run) – gold medal
