= Peter Fill =

Italian alpine skier

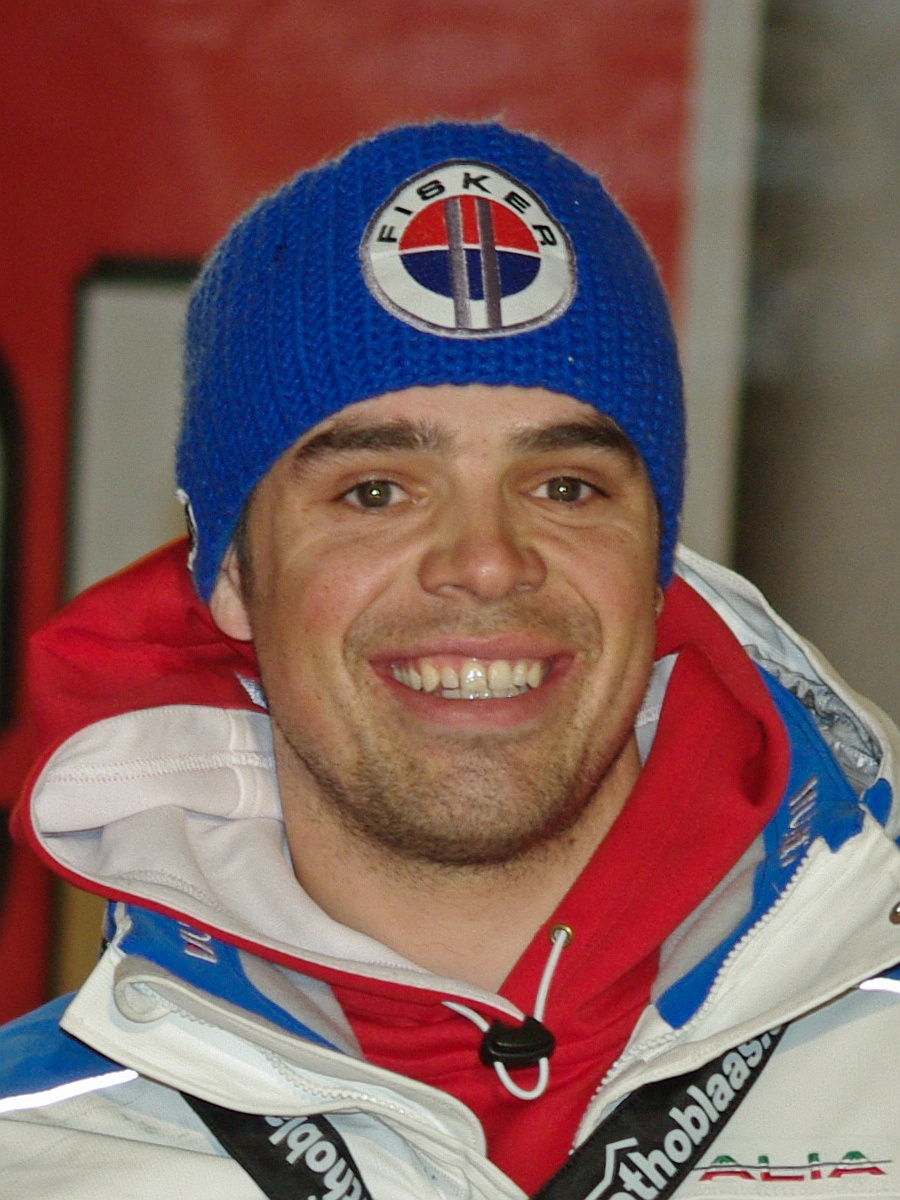
- Peter Fill in February 2011

Personal information
- Born: 12 November 1982 (age 43) Brixen, South Tyrol, Italy
- Height: 175 cm (5 ft 9 in)
- Website: peter-fill.com

Skiing career
- Sport: Alpine skiing
- Club: CS Carabinieri
- Retired: 1 February 2020
- Disciplines: Downhill, Super-G, Combined
- World Cup debut: 7 March 2002 (age 19)

Olympics
- Teams: 4 (2006, 2010, 2014, 2018)
- Medals: 0

World Championships
- Teams: 7 (2003–13, 2017)
- Medals: 2 (0 gold)

World Cup
- Seasons: 17 (2002–2018)
- Wins: 3 (2 DH, 1 SG)
- Podiums: 22 (13 DH, 5 SG, 4 AC)
- Overall titles: 0 – (6th in 2007, 2017)
- Discipline titles: 3 – (2 DH, 1 AC)
Medal record
Men's alpine skiing
Representing Italy
International alpine ski competitions
Event	1st	2nd	3rd
World Championships	0	1	1
World Junior Championships	1	0	1
Total	1	1	2
World Cup race podiums
Event	1st	2nd	3rd
Downhill	2	6	5
Super-G	1	2	2
Combined	0	2	2
Total	3	10	9
World Championships
Silver medal – second place	2009 Val-d'Isère	Super-G
Bronze medal – third place	2011 Garmisch	Combined

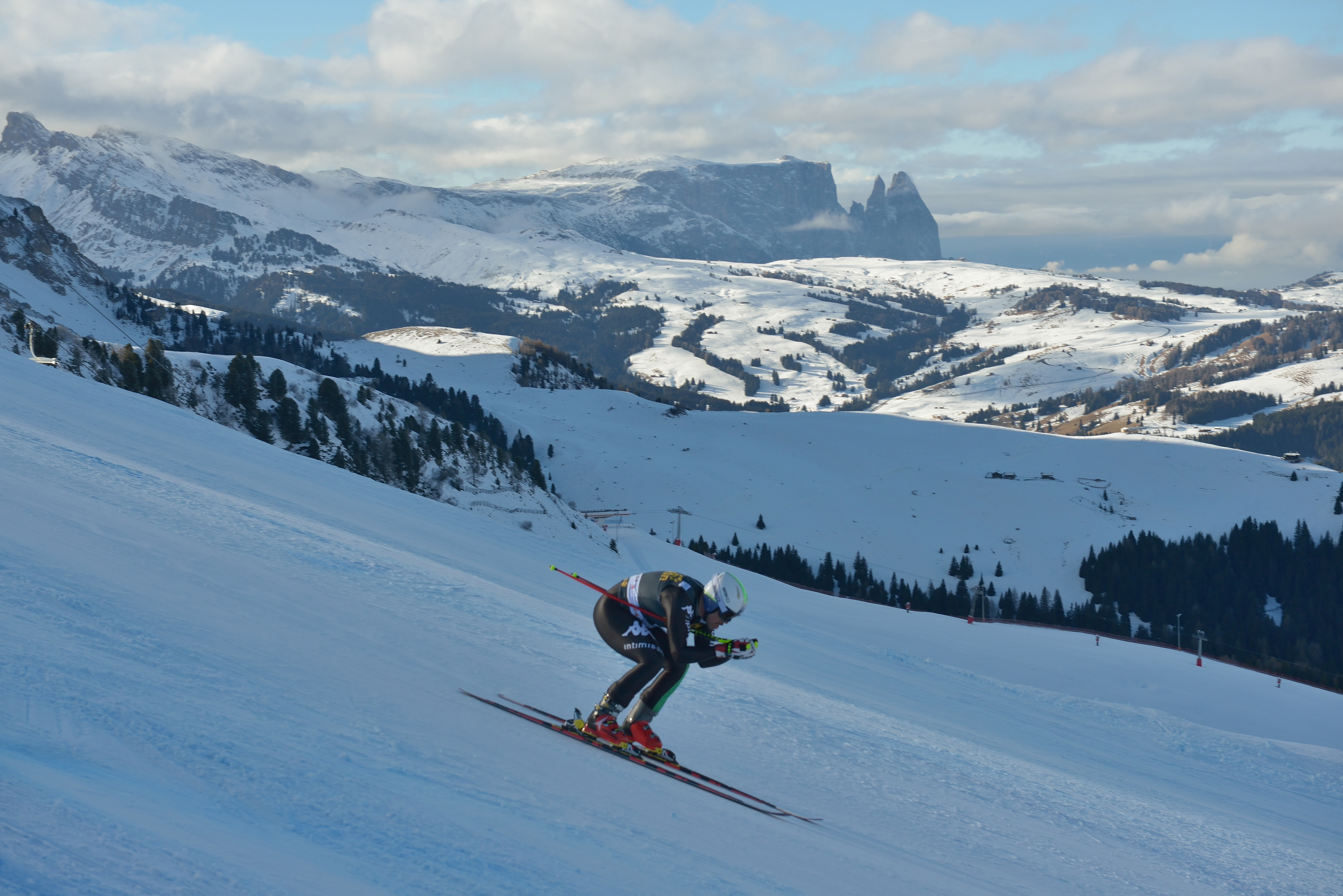
Fill at Val Gardena in December 2013

Peter Fill (born 12 November 1982) is a former World Cup alpine ski racer from northern Italy. Born in Brixen, South Tyrol, he formerly competed in all disciplines, and later focused on the speed events of downhill, super-G, and combined. Fill won the World Cup season title in downhill in 2016 and in 2017, and the combined title in 2018.

== Career ==
Fill is an all-round skier. In the 2007 season, Fill was among the overall leaders for the overall World Cup title, the first Italian since Alberto Tomba to rank in the overall top ten.

Fill learned to ski at the age of three with the help of his first teacher Frieda Senoner. He achieved his first successes during his middle-school years, while he was coached by Peter Thomaseth. In 1997/98, he joined the Seiser Alm training center, where he was coached by his uncle Arnold. In the same year, he joined the B-Pool of the Bolzano-Bozen ski team (coached by Sepp Steinwandter). One year later, he advanced to the A-Pool under Stephan Feichter. In 1999, he won every discipline at the National Junior Championships and returned home with four gold medals; he was called "the phenomenon" by the Italian press.

In 2000, Fill joined the national team for the first time. His coach was Ernst Pfeifhofer, who continued as his coach for the following year in the Italian B-Team. At the same time he became a member of the Carabinieri sportsgroup. As a junior in 2001, he achieved his first important success on an international level, a bronze medal in the super-G at the Junior World Championships.

In 2002/03 Fill was part of the A-Team of Flavio Roda for the first time. In February 2002, Fill won the World Juniors and, as a result, took part in his first super-G race of World Cup on 7 March 2002 at Altenmarkt in Austria, where he placed 12th outpacing the Norwegian Lasse Kjus by one hundredth of a second. While Fill's strengths are the downhill and super-G, he is also competitive in the technical disciplines. On 13 January 2006, he stood third on the Ski World Cup podium of the super combined race in Wengen (Switzerland).

During the 2006 and 2007 World Cup seasons, Fill had seven podiums: four in downhill, two in super-G, and a combined, but no wins. On March 21, 2007, he became Italian Champion in multiple disciplines (twice in super-G and once in giant slalom), bringing his career total of national championships to three.

During the 2008 season, Fill was unable to reach the podium but managed to place in the top-ten 10 on six occasions. On 29 November 2008 in Lake Louise (Canada), he won his first World Cup competition, beating Swiss Carlo Janka and Swede Hans Olsson, becoming the seventh Italian in World Cup history to win a downhill competition.

On 4 February 2009, Fill won the silver medal in super-G during the World Championships in Val-d'Isère (France) on the icy and steep slope Face del Bellevarde. He managed to place himself before the three-time World Champion Aksel Lund Svindal, but was not fast enough to beat the Swiss Didier Cuche. His medal was the only one won by the Azzurri in the men's competitions.

Fill won his second World Cup race in 2016, the downhill at Kitzbühel, on a difficult dark and windy day on the Streif that ended the season of overall leader Aksel Lund Svindal. Fill went on to become the first Italian to win the World Cup downhill title, finishing tenth at the last downhill of the season in St. Moritz in March 2016 to finish 26 points ahead of Svindal.

== Personal ==
Fill is a cousin of retired giant slalom racer and fellow Kastelruther Denise Karbon. After junior high school, he started working as an auto body mechanic while attending a vocational school, which he left after becoming more involved in alpine skiing competitions. His mother tongue is German but he is also fluent in Italian and English. His idol in everyday life is his uncle Norbert Rier, leader of the Kastelruther Spatzen (a well-known folk group, especially in German-speaking countries) who dedicated the song "Wiedermal a super Zeit" to Fill for his silver medal in super-G at the World Championships in Val-d'Isère in 2009.

Since 2007, Fill's manager has been Andreas Goller, who previously represented Kristian Ghedina. His ski technician is South-Tyrolean Sepp Kuppelwieser (who was ski man for Kjetil André Aamodt for ten years).

During the 2009 season, Atomic, Briko, Finstral, and Leki, as official sponsors and suppliers, decided to reward Fill for his excellent results achieved during the season, offering him the chance to win the Artega GT sport car if he were to capture the downhill at the World Cup finals in Sweden at Åre in March.

== World Cup results ==
=== Season titles ===
- 3 titles – (2 downhill - 1 combined)

Season	Discipline
2016	Downhill
2017	Downhill
2018	Combined

=== Season standings ===
Season	Age	Overall	Slalom	Giant slalom	Super-G	Downhill	Combined
2002	19	114	—	—	33	—	—
2003	20	65	—	28	34	45	—
2004	21	40	—	44	16	33	15
2005	22	30	—	36	30	19	8
2006	23	16	50	33	8	14	6
2007	24	6	—	25	9	4	7
2008	25	26	—	36	27	14	10
2009	26	10	—	31	10	9	8
2010	27	104	—	—	—	38	—
2011	28	21	—	—	19	17	9
2012	29	35	—	—	25	22	17
2013	30	38	—	—	17	24	21
2014	31	15	—	—	10	12	7
2015	32	34	—	—	20	20	—
2016	33	10	—	—	9	1	16
2017	34	6	—	—	5	1	29
2018	35	16	—	—	14	11	1

=== Race podiums ===
- 3 wins (2 DH, 1 SG)
- 22 podiums (13 DH, 5 SG, 4 AC)

Season	Date	Location	Discipline	Place
2006	13 Jan 2006	Wengen, Switzerland	Super combined	3rd
2006	20 Jan 2006	Kitzbühel, Austria	Super-G	2nd
2006	15 Mar 2006	Åre, Sweden	Downhill	3rd
2007	25 Nov 2006	Lake Louise, Canada	Downhill	3rd
2007	20 Dec 2006	Hinterstoder, Austria	Super-G	2nd
2007	29 Dec 2006	Bormio, Italy	Downhill	2nd
2007	13 Jan 2007	Wengen, Switzerland	Downhill	3rd
2009	29 Nov 2008	Lake Louise, Canada	Downhill	1st
2009	16 Jan 2009	Wengen, Switzerland	Super combined	2nd
2014	6 Dec 2013	(United States) Beaver Creek, USA	Downhill	3rd
2014	7 Dec 2013	(United States) Beaver Creek, USA	Super-G	3rd
2016	28 Nov 2015	Lake Louise, Canada	Downhill	2nd
2016	29 Nov 2015	Lake Louise, Canada	Super-G	3rd
2016	23 Jan 2016	Kitzbühel, Austria	Downhill	1st
2017	3 Dec 2016	Val-d'Isère, France	Downhill	2nd
2017	27 Jan 2017	Garmisch, Germany	Downhill	3rd
2017	28 Jan 2017	Garmisch, Germany	Downhill	2nd
2017	25 Feb 2017	Kvitfjell, Norway	Downhill	2nd
2017	26 Feb 2017	Kvitfjell, Norway	Super-G	1st
2017	15 Mar 2017	(United States) Aspen, USA	Downhill	2nd
2018	29 Dec 2017	Bormio, Italy	Super combined	2nd
2018	12 Jan 2018	Wengen, Switzerland	Super combined	3rd

== World Championship results ==
Year	Age	Slalom	Giant slalom	Super-G	Downhill	Combined
2003	20	DNF1	—	13	20	11
2005	22	—	—	14	24	DNF
2007	24	—	23	14	11	13
2009	26	—	—	2	14	5
2011	28	—	—	9	14	3
2013	30	—	—	14	12	—
2015	32	—	—	—	—	—
2017	34	—	—	11	9	DNF1

== Olympic results ==
Year	Age	Slalom	Giant slalom	Super-G	Downhill	Combined
2006	23	—	—	13	19	9
2010	27	—	—	DSQ	15	DNF2
2014	31	—	—	8	7	DNF2
2018	35	—	—	DNF	6	DNF2

== See also ==
- Italian skiers who closed in top 10 in overall World Cup
