= Aleksandr Khoroshilov =

Russian alpine skier

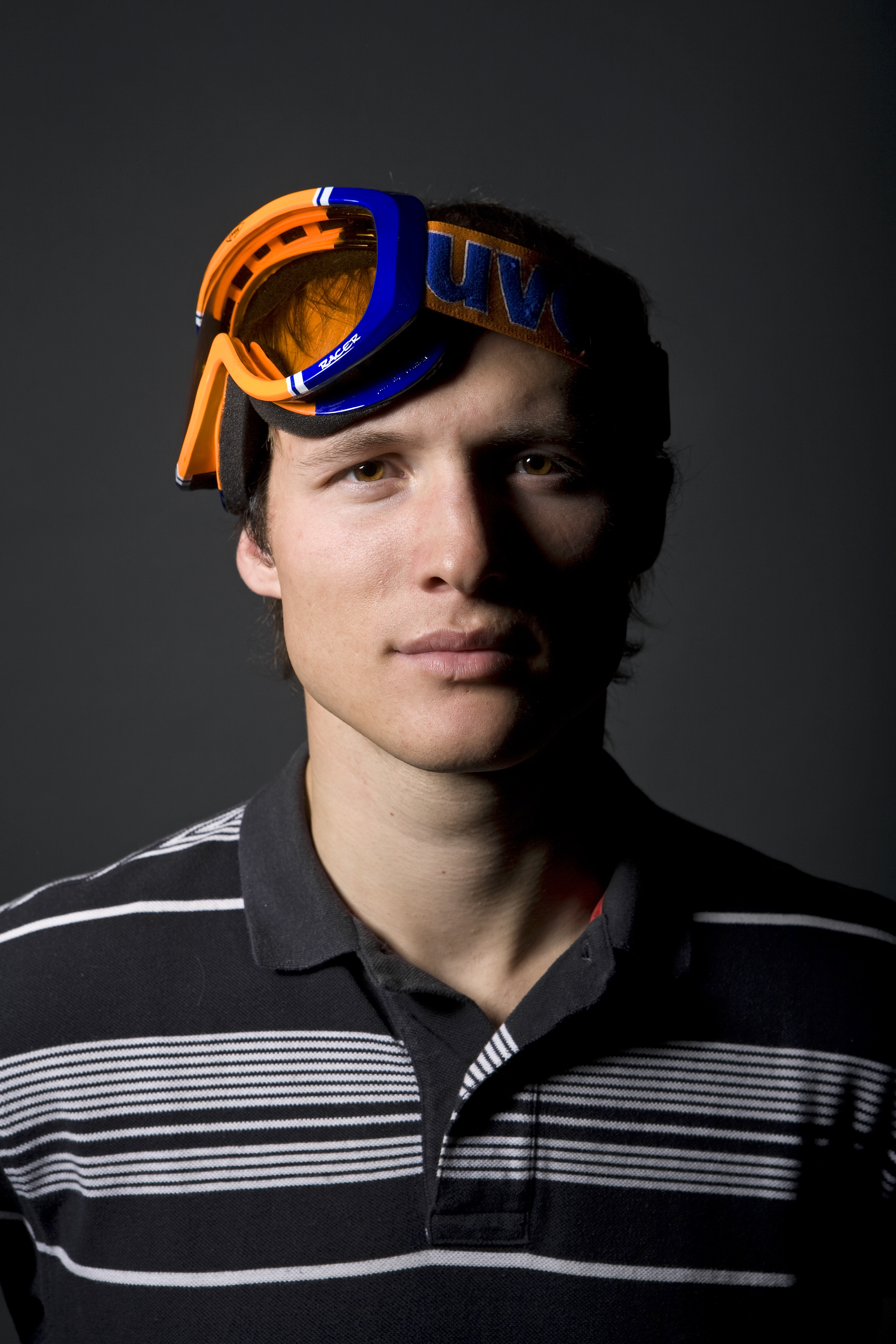
- Khoroshilov in 2009

Personal information
- Born: 16 February 1984 (age 42) Yelizovo, Kamchatka Krai, Russian SFSR, Soviet Union
- Height: 1.82 m (6 ft 0 in)

Skiing career
- Sport: Alpine skiing
- Club: FSO of Russia
- Disciplines: Slalom
- World Cup debut: 12 December 2004 (age 20)

Olympics
- Teams: 5 – (2006, 2010, 2014, 2018, 2022)
- Medals: 0

World Championships
- Teams: 9 – (2005–21)
- Medals: 0

World Cup
- Seasons: 17 – (2004, 2006, 2008–2022)
- Wins: 1
- Podiums: 10 – (10 SL)
- Overall titles: 0 – (13th in 2015)
- Discipline titles: 0 – (3rd in SL, 2015)

Aleksandr Viktorovich Khoroshilov (Russian: Александр Викторович Хорошилов; born 16 February 1984) is a Russian inactive World Cup alpine ski racer who specializes in slalom. He gained his first victory in 2015 in the slalom at Schladming and became the first Russian male to win a World Cup race in 34 years since Aleksandr Zhirov of the Soviet Union in 1981.

== World Cup results ==
=== Season standings ===
Season	Age	Overall	Slalom	Giant Slalom	Super G	Downhill	Combined
2006	22	101	—	—	—	—	24
2007	23	did not compete					
2008	24	102	—	—	—	—	31
2009	25	89	63	—	—	—	17
2010	26	117	60	—	58	—	38
2011	27	132	54	—	—	—	47
2012	28	100	38	—	—	—	—
2013	29	73	26	—	—	—	28
2014	30	57	19	—	—	—	22
2015	31	13	3	—	—	—	—
2016	32	27	5	—	—	—	—
2017	33	19	6	—	—	—	—
2018	34	91	29	—	—	—	—
2019	35	83	27	—	—	—	—
2020	36	40	10	—	—	—	—
2021	37	59	20	—	—	—	—
2022	37	78	28	—	—	—	—

- Standings through 27 February 2022

=== Race podiums ===
- 1 win – (1 SL)
- 10 podiums – (10 SL)

Season	Date	Location	Discipline	Rank
2015	14 Dec 2014	Åre, Sweden	Slalom	3rd
2015	27 Jan 2015	Schladming, Austria	Slalom	1st
2015	22 Mar 2015	Méribel, France	Slalom	3rd
2016	6 Jan 2016	Santa Caterina, Italy	Slalom	3rd
2016	10 Jan 2016	Adelboden, Switzerland	Slalom	3rd
2016	26 Jan 2016	Schladming, Austria	Slalom	3rd
2017	11 Dec 2016	Val d'Isère, France	Slalom	3rd
2017	22 Jan 2017	Kitzbühel, Austria	Slalom	3rd
2017	24 Jan 2017	Schladming, Austria	Slalom	3rd
2020	19 Jan 2020	Wengen, Switzerland	Slalom	3rd

== World Championships results ==
Year	Age	Slalom	Giant slalom	Super-G	Downhill	Combined
2005	21	DNF1	—	—	DNF	DNF SL1
2007	23	DNS1	31	43	43	DNF2
2009	25	12	DNF1	30	—	10
2011	27	DNF1	53	DNF	—	—
2013	29	DNF1	—	—	—	23
2015	30	8	—	—	—	—
2017	33	5	—	—	—	—
2019	35	15	—	—	—	—
2021	37	DNF1	—	—	—	—

== Olympic results ==
Year	Age	Slalom	Giant slalom	Super-G	Downhill	Combined
2006	22	DNF1	—	41	38	22
2010	26	23	38	28	45	21
2014	30	14	—	—	—	30
2018	34	17	—	—	—	—
2022	38	10	—	—	—	—
