= Steven Nyman =

American alpine skier (born 1982)

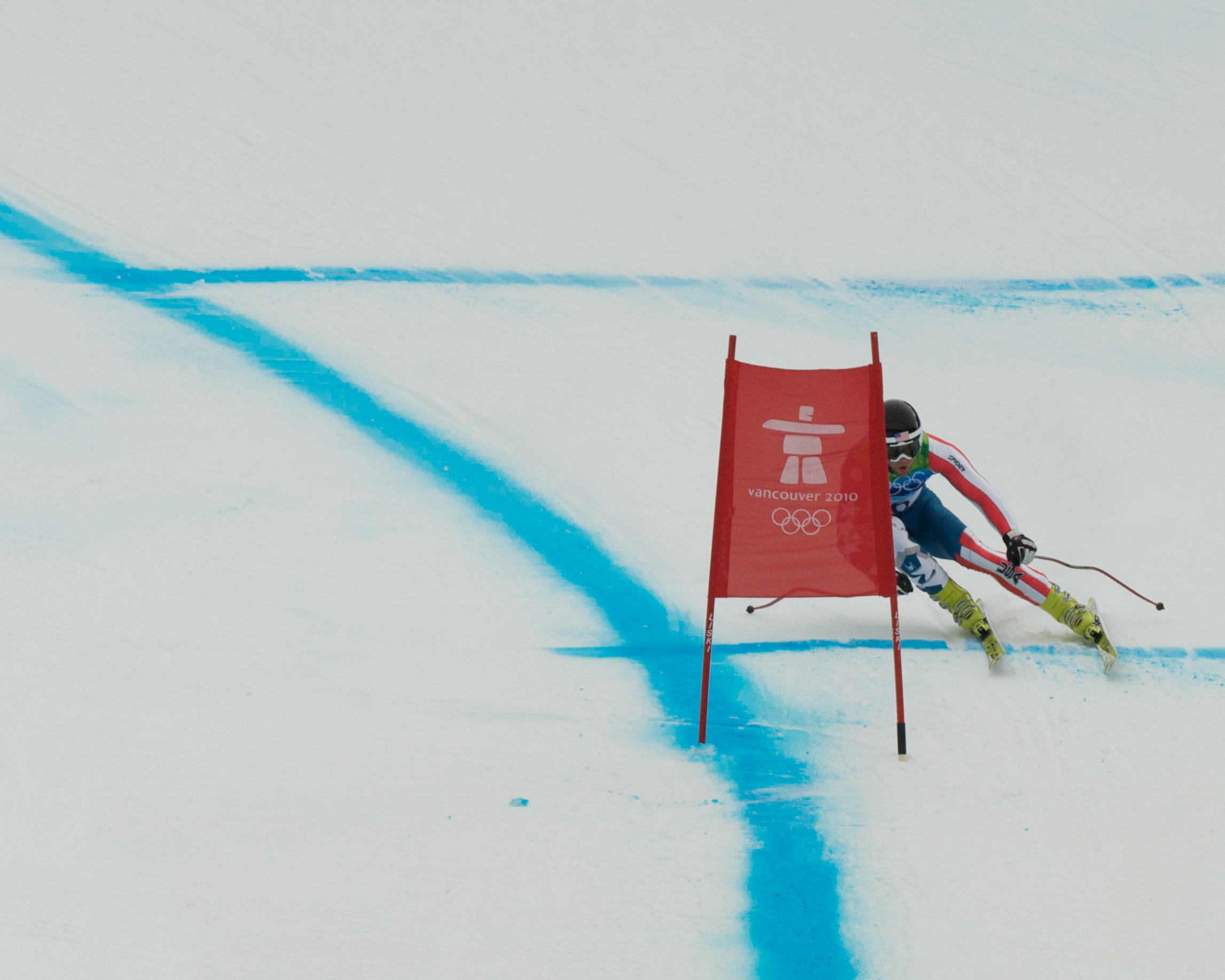
- Nyman at the 2010 Winter Olympics

Personal information
- Born: February 12, 1982 (age 44) Provo, Utah, U.S.
- Height: 6 ft 4 in (193 cm)
- Website: nymansworld.com

Skiing career
- Sport: Alpine skiing
- Club: Park City Ski Education Foundation
- Disciplines: Downhill, Super-G
- World Cup debut: March 9, 2002 (age 20)

Olympics
- Teams: 3 – (2006, 2010, 2014)
- Medals: 0

World Championships
- Teams: 5 – (2007, 2011–15, 2019)
- Medals: 0

World Cup
- Seasons: 14 – (2006–19)
- Wins: 3 – (3 DH)
- Podiums: 11 – (11 DH)
- Overall titles: 0 – (20th in 2016)
- Discipline titles: 0 – (6th in DH, 2015, 2016)
Medal record
Men's alpine skiing
Representing the United States
World Junior Championships
Gold medal – first place	2002 Tarvisio	Slalom
Silver medal – second place	2002 Tarvisio	Combined

Steven Nyman (born February 12, 1982) is a World Cup alpine ski racer on the U.S. Ski Team. Formerly a slalom skier, he is now a speed specialist, with a main focus on downhill.

Born in Provo, Utah, Nyman raced at Sundance as a junior until making a move to Park City in 1999. He was a discretionary pick for the 2002 World Junior Championships in Tarvisio, Italy, where he won the slalom and finished second in the combined. His slalom gold qualified him to compete in the World Cup Finals in Flachau, Austria, and finished a surprising 15th in his World Cup debut. He did not compete regularly on the World Cup until the 2006 season, during which he notched a pair of top-ten finishes and competed in his first Winter Olympics, finishing 19th in downhill, 29th in combined, and 43rd in super G.

Nyman made his first World Cup podium in December 2006, placing third in a downhill at the Birds of Prey course at Beaver Creek, Colorado. Fifteen days later, he won his first World Cup race, a downhill in Val Gardena, Italy.

As the fastest racer at the 2010–2011 NASTAR National Championships, Nyman was the NASTAR National Pacesetter and represented the National Standard or Par Time for the 2010–2011 season.

Nyman won his third World Cup downhill in December 2014, all at Val Gardena. He injured his right knee (ACL) in late January 2018 at Garmisch and missed the rest of the season, including the 2018 Olympics; he had finished third at the pre-Olympic downhill at Jeongseon two years earlier.

== World Cup results ==
=== Season standings ===
Season	Age	Overall	Slalom	Giant Slalom	Super G	Downhill	Combined
2002	20	119	50	—	—	—	—
2003	21						
2004	22						
2005	23						
2006	24	46	—	—	33	24	13
2007	25	26	—	—	25	10	21
2008	26	49	—	—	32	19	—
2009	27	78	—	—	46	27	—
2010	28	89	—	—	—	32	—
2011	29	90	—	—	52	32	—
2012	30						
2013	31	59	—	—	45	20	—
2014	32	83	—	—	43	35	—
2015	33	26	—	—	40	6	—
2016	34	20	—	—	28	6	—
2017	35	56	—	—	36	22	—
2018	36	119	—	—	—	41	—
2019	37	46	—	—	27	16	—
2020	38	55	—	—	26	20	—
2021	39						
2022	40	85	—	—	48	32	—

Standings through 20 March 2022

=== Podiums ===
- 3 wins – (3 DH)
- 11 podiums – (11 DH)

Season	Date	Location	Discipline	Place
2007	1 Dec 2006	(United States) Beaver Creek, USA	Downhill	3rd
2007	16 Dec 2006	Val Gardena, Italy	Downhill	1st
2008	30 Nov 2007	(United States) Beaver Creek, USA	Downhill	2nd
2013	15 Dec 2012	Val Gardena, Italy	Downhill	1st
2015	5 Dec 2014	(United States) Beaver Creek, USA	Downhill	3rd
2015	19 Dec 2014	Val Gardena, Italy	Downhill	1st
2016	6 Feb 2016	Jeongseon, South Korea	Downhill	3rd
2016	20 Feb 2016	Chamonix, France	Downhill	2nd
2016	12 Mar 2016	Kvitfjell, Norway	Downhill	3rd
2016	16 Mar 2016	St. Moritz, Switzerland	Downhill	2nd
2017	17 Dec 2016	Val Gardena, Italy	Downhill	3rd

== World Championships results ==
Year	Age	Slalom	Giant slalom	Super-G	Downhill	Combined
2007	25	—	—	12	21	9
2009	27	Injured, did not compete.				
2011	29	—	—	—	13	—
2013	31	—	—	—	25	—
2015	33	—	—	20	4	—
2017	35	Injured, did not compete.				
2019	37	—	—	8	23	—

== Olympic results ==
Year	Age	Slalom	Giant slalom	Super-G	Downhill	Combined
2006	24	—	—	43	19	29
2010	28	—	—	—	20	—
2014	32	—	—	—	27	—
2018	36	Injured, did not compete.				

== Sponsors ==
Nyman's sponsors are Fischer (skis, boots, bindings) POC (helmets, goggles), Spyder, VISA, Powerbar, Ski Salt Lake and Swix. In 2006 Nyman sold his helmet sponsor over eBay. The winning bidder was Ski Salt Lake.
