= Benjamin Raich =

Austrian alpine skier (born 1978)

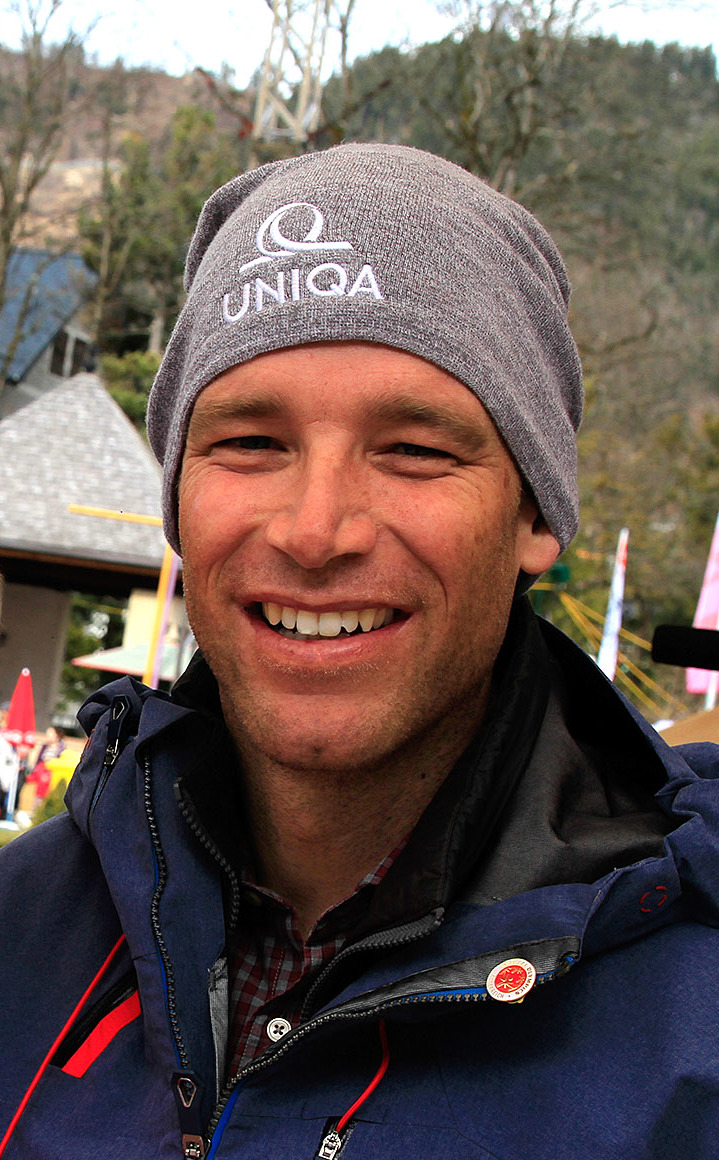
- Raich in March 2017

Personal information
- Born: 28 February 1978 (age 48) Arzl im Pitztal, Tyrol, Austria
- Height: 1.81 m (5 ft 11 in)
- Website: Raich.at

Skiing career
- Sport: Alpine skiing
- Club: S.V. Leins Pitztal – Tirol
- Retired: 10 September 2015 (age 37)
- Disciplines: Slalom, giant slalom, combined, super-G, downhill
- World Cup debut: 10 March 1996 (age 18)

Olympics
- Teams: 4 (2002–2014)
- Medals: 4 (2 gold)

World Championships
- Teams: 9 (1999–2015)
- Medals: 10 (3 gold)

World Cup
- Seasons: 18 (1998–2015)
- Wins: 36 (14 SL, 14 GS, 1 SG, 7 AC)
- Podiums: 92
- Overall titles: 1 (2006)
- Discipline titles: 8 (3 SL, 2 GS, 3 AC)
Medal record
International alpine ski competitions
Event	1st	2nd	3rd
Olympic Games	2	0	2
World Championships	3	6	1
Total	5	6	3
World Cup race podiums
Event	1st	2nd	3rd
Slalom	14	11	13
Giant	14	10	11
Super-G	1	5	2
Downhill	0	0	0
Combined	7	3	1
Parallel	0	0	0
Total	36	29	27
Olympic Games
Gold medal – first place	2006 Turin	Giant slalom
Gold medal – first place	2006 Turin	Slalom
Bronze medal – third place	2002 Salt Lake City	Slalom
Bronze medal – third place	2002 Salt Lake City	Combined
World Championships
Gold medal – first place	2005 Bormio	Slalom
Gold medal – first place	2005 Bormio	Combined
Gold medal – first place	2007 Åre	Team event
Silver medal – second place	2001 St. Anton	Slalom
Silver medal – second place	2005 Bormio	Giant slalom
Silver medal – second place	2005 Bormio	Team event
Silver medal – second place	2007 Åre	Super combined
Silver medal – second place	2009 Val-d'Isère	Giant slalom
Silver medal – second place	2011 Garmisch	Team event
Bronze medal – third place	2005 Bormio	Super-G
Junior World Ski Championships
Gold medal – first place	1996 Hoch-Ybrig	Slalom
Gold medal – first place	1997 Schladming	Giant slalom
Gold medal – first place	1998 Megève	Giant slalom
Gold medal – first place	1998 Megève	Slalom
Gold medal – first place	1998 Megève	Combination

Benjamin Raich (born 28 February 1978) is an Austrian former World Cup champion alpine ski racer and Olympic gold medalist. With 14 medals won at Winter Olympics and World Championships, 36 World Cup race victories (in all disciplines except downhill), one first place and five second places in the World Cup overall ranking, three victories of the slalom World Cup, three victories of the combined World Cup, two victories of the giant slalom World Cup and the highest score of career World Cup points (ahead of Norwegian Kjetil André Aamodt), he is considered among the best alpine racers in World Cup history.

== Career ==
After winning Junior World Championships in both slalom and giant slalom, Raich made his World Cup debut in March 1996. He scored his first victory in 1999, in slalom.

In 2001, Raich won the silver medal in slalom at the World Championships, and at the end of the season he won the slalom World Cup. In 2002 he won two bronze medals at the Salt Lake City Olympics.

Raich, who became better at faster specialities such as super-G and downhill with age also, in 2005 barely missed out on the overall World Cup title, placing second to American Bode Miller. At the 2005 World Championships, he won a total of five medals, one for each race except for the downhill.

Raich won the 2006 World Cup overall title in the most successful season of his career, as well as Olympic gold medals in slalom and giant slalom at the Turin Olympics.

Throughout his career, Raich has been known for his consistency which led to him to second places in the overall world cup in 2005, 2007, 2008, 2009 and 2010 (narrowly missing out the titles in both 2007 and 2009 by 13 points and 2 points respectively, both times behind Svindal).

Raich's last World Cup race victory came in February 2012 in Swiss Crans Montana, where he won his first and only World Cup victory in super-G. In March 2014, he reached the podium for the first time in more than two years by finishing second (after Ted Ligety) in a giant slalom race in Kranjska Gora, the same place where he also won his first top-three result more than 15 years earlier (in January 1999). His last top-three finish came in early March 2015 in a giant slalom race in Garmisch-Partenkirchen that came to be one of his final races in the alpine world cup.

On September 10, 2015, Raich announced his retirement.

== World Cup results ==
=== Season standings ===
Season	Age	Overall	Slalom	Giant slalom	Super-G	Downhill	Combined
1998	20	96	—	37	—	—	—
1999	21	10	7	6	32	—	—
2000	22	9	6	4	—	—	—
2001	23	4	1	4	—	—	—
2002	24	9	19	2	—	—	—
2003	25	8	6	8	37	—	—
2004	26	3	3	4	8	35	2
2005	27	2	1	1	6	26	1
2006	28	1	3	1	15	28	1
2007	29	2	1	3	13	32	5
2008	30	2	8	2	3	36	6
2009	31	2	10	2	14	32	5
2010	32	2	6	3	4	—	1
2011	33	11	15	19	8	54	18
2012	34	12	16	13	7	31	12
2013	35	20	18	16	38	—	8
2014	36	20	17	6	—	—	—
2015	37	28	23	9	—	—	—

=== Season titles ===
9 titles: 1 overall, 2 giant slalom, 3 slalom, 3 combined

Season	Discipline
2001	Slalom
2005	Giant slalom
2005	Slalom
2005	Combined
2006	Overall
2006	Giant slalom
2006	Combined
2007	Slalom
2010	Combined

=== Individual races ===
36 total: 14 slalom, 14 giant slalom, 1 super-G, 7 combined

Season	Date	Location	Race
1999	7 January 1999	Schladming, Austria	Slalom
1999	10 January 1999	Flachau, Austria	Giant slalom
1999	17 January 1999	Wengen, Switzerland	Slalom
2000	26 February 2000	Yongpyong, South Korea	Giant slalom
2000	18 March 2000	Bormio, Italy	Giant slalom
2001	14 January 2001	Wengen, Switzerland	Slalom
2001	21 January 2001	Kitzbühel, Austria	Slalom
2001	23 January 2001	Schladming, Austria	Slalom
2001	11 March 2001	Åre, Sweden	Slalom
2002	21 December 2001	Kranjska Gora, Slovenia	Giant slalom
2004	3 January 2004	Flachau, Austria	Giant slalom
2004	18 January 2004	Wengen, Switzerland	Slalom
2004	27 January 2004	Schladming, Austria	Slalom
2005	5 December 2004	Beaver Creek, CO, USA	Slalom
2005	14 January 2005	Wengen, Switzerland	Combined
2005	2005 World Championships		
2005	26 February 2005	Kranjska Gora, Slovenia	Giant slalom
2006	21 December 2005	Kranjska Gora, Slovenia	Giant slalom
2006	7 January 2006	Adelboden, Switzerland	Giant slalom
2006	13 January 2006	Wengen, Switzerland	Super combined
2006	22 January 2006	Kitzbühel, Austria	Combined
2006	3 February 2006	Chamonix, France	Super combined
2006	2006 Winter Olympics		
2006	10 March 2006	Shiga Kōgen, Japan	Slalom
2006	17 March 2006	Åre, Sweden	Giant slalom
2007	12 November 2006	Levi, Finland	Slalom
2007	6 January 2007	Adelboden, Switzerland	Giant slalom
2007	23 January 2007	Schladming, Austria	Slalom
2007	2007 World Championships		
2007	3 March 2007	Kranjska Gora, Slovenia	Giant slalom
2007	9 March 2007	Kvitfjell, Norway	Super combined
2007	18 March 2007	Lenzerheide, Switzerland	Slalom
2008	9 December 2007	Bad Kleinkirchheim, Austria	Slalom
2009	7 December 2008	Beaver Creek, CO, USA	Giant slalom
2009	12 December 2008	Val-d'Isère, France	Super combined
2009	10 January 2009	Adelboden, Switzerland	Giant slalom
2009	13 March 2009	Åre, Sweden	Giant slalom
2010	11 December 2009	Val-d'Isère, France	Super combined
2012	25 February 2012	Crans Montana, Switzerland	Super-G

== World Championship results ==
Year	Age	Slalom	Giant slalom	Super-G	Downhill	Combined	Team event
1999	20	5	DNF2	—	—	—	not run
2001	22	2	DNF2	—	—	—	not run
2003	24	4	9	—	—	—	not run
2005	26	1	2	3	—	1	2
2007	28	4	DNF1	—	—	2	1
2009	30	DSQ2	2	5	—	DNF1	cancelled
2011	32	—	—	5	—	5	2
2013	34	13	9	—	—	DNF2	—
2015	36	DNF1	DNF1	—	—	—	—

== Olympic results ==
Year	Age	Slalom	Giant slalom	Super-G	Downhill	Combined
2002	23	3	4	—	—	3
2006	27	1	1	21	—	DNF
2010	31	4	6	14	—	6
2014	35	DNF1	7	—	—	—

== Personal ==
His sister Carina Raich also is a ski racer. Benjamin Raich is married to skier Marlies Schild. They have three children together.

== See also ==
- Ski World Cup Most podiums & Top 10 results
