= Didier Cuche =

Swiss alpine skier

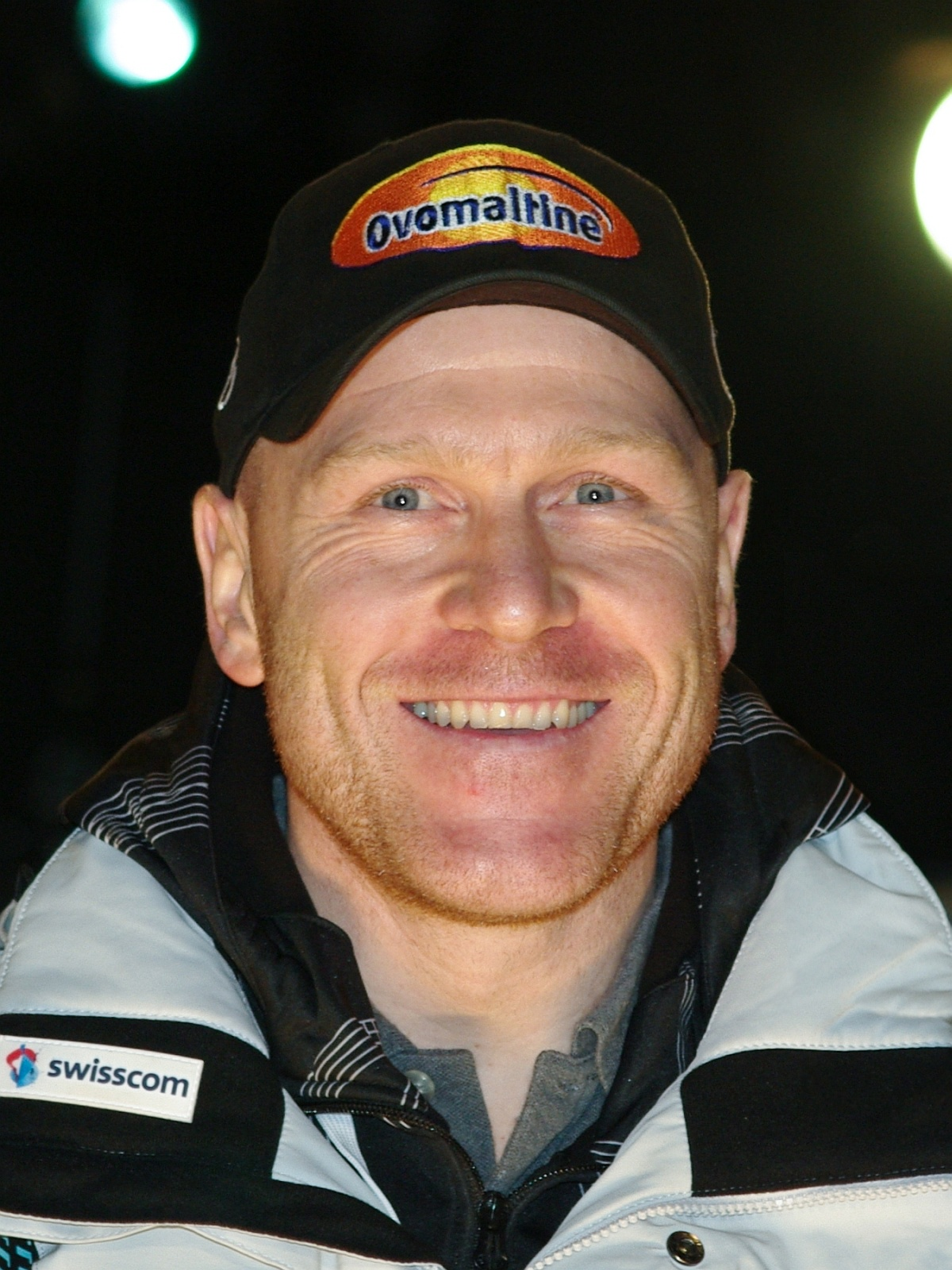
- Cuche in February 2011

Personal information
- Full name: Didier Cuche
- Born: 16 August 1974 (age 52) Le Pâquier, Neuchâtel, Switzerland
- Height: 1.74 m (5 ft 8 1/2 in)
- Weight: 200 lb (91 kg)
- Website: Didier Cuche.ch

Sport
- Sport: Skiing
- Club: Chasseral Dombresson

World Cup career
- Seasons: 1993–2012
- Indiv. podiums: 67
- Indiv. wins: 21
- Overall titles: 0
- Discipline titles: 6
Medal record
Men's alpine skiing
Representing Switzerland
World Cup race podiums
Event	1st	2nd	3rd
Giant slalom	3	5	4
Downhill	12	16	4
Super-G	6	5	12
Total	21	26	20
Olympic Games
Silver medal – second place	1998 Nagano	Super-G
World Championships
Gold medal – first place	2009 Val-d'Isère	Super-G
Silver medal – second place	2009 Val-d'Isère	Downhill
Silver medal – second place	2011 Garmisch	Downhill
Bronze medal – third place	2007 Åre	Giant slalom
- Updated on 25 February 2012

Didier Cuche (born 16 August 1974) is a former World Cup alpine ski racer from Switzerland.

== Career ==
Born in Le Pâquier, Neuchâtel, he competed in the downhill and super-G, along with the giant slalom. He won the World Cup downhill and super-G title for the 2011 season and has won three previous downhill titles in 2010, 2008 and 2007, along with a giant slalom title in 2009. Cuche has 21 World Cup race victories, along with 67 podiums (top three) and 181 top ten finishes. He is also an Olympic silver medalist and has won a total of four World Championships medals (a gold, two silvers, and a bronze). He retired from competition following the 2012 season.

At the 1998 Winter Olympics in Nagano, Japan, Cuche was the silver medalist in the super-G, where he had exactly the same time as Hans Knauss resulting in a rare sharing of the medal (no bronze medal was awarded).

Cuche switched from Atomic to Head skis following the 2006 season, joining Bode Miller and Hermann Maier.

During the 2007 season, Cuche was in top form, winning the downhill season title with a victory and four-second-place finishes. In the Bormio downhill on 28 December 2006 he finished second, 0.01 seconds behind winner Michael Walchhofer, the smallest measurable amount in ski racing.

Cuche repeated as the World Cup downhill season champion in 2008 with 584 points, five ahead of overall champion Bode Miller. Cuche finished third overall and nearly won the super-G season title, finishing a single point behind champion Hannes Reichelt.

At the 2009 World Championships in Val-d'Isère, France, Cuche won the super-G and was the silver medalist in the downhill.

A week after winning the super-G and downhill at Kitzbühel in 2010, Cuche broke his right thumb in the giant slalom at Kranjska Gora, Slovenia, on 29 January, two weeks before the 2010 Winter Olympics. The injury put Cuche's Olympic participation in doubt, and he was immediately flown to Switzerland. After successful thumb surgery, he was cleared to compete in the Olympics in Canada. Cuche had a disappointing Olympics and did not win any medal; however, he regained the title of World Cup downhill champion for the 2010 season at the first post-Olympic race. Cuche won the downhill on the challenging Olympiabakken course at Kvitfjell, Norway, on 6 March for his fifth World Cup victory of the season. Until 2010, Cuche had never won more than two World Cup events in a single season.

On 22 January 2011, Cuche became the oldest race winner in the history of the World Cup, winning the Hahnenkamm downhill in Kitzbühel at the age of 36 years, 159 days. It was also his fourth downhill victory in Kitzbühel, which tied him with Franz Klammer for the record on the Hahnenkamm. He has since added a fifth victory in Kitzbühel to his tally, thus becoming the sole record holder; Klammer was there to congratulate him at the finish.

At the 2011 World Championships in February, he won the silver medal in the downhill. In March he won the World Cup downhill championship for the 2011 season. This marked the fourth time he won the season title (2011, 2010, 2008, 2007), a record only surpassed by Franz Klammer who won the title five times. He ended the 2011 World Cup season in first-place ranking in downhill and super-G, finishing second in the overall rankings to Ivica Kostelić.

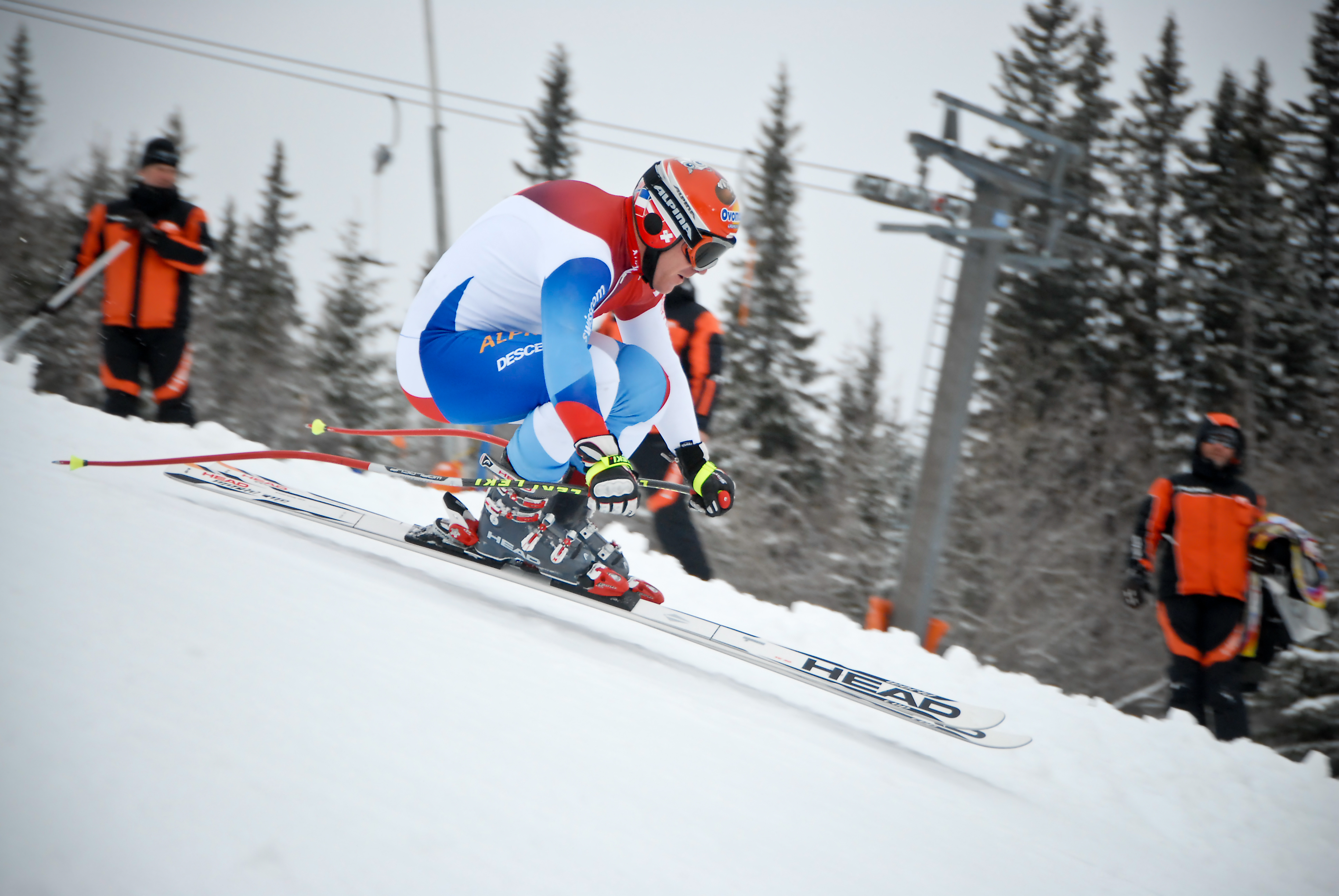
Cuche in 2010

After considerable speculation as to whether Cuche might instead retire, he opened the 2012 World Cup season by winning the downhill race at Lake Louise, Canada, further extending the age record he had last broken at 36 years, 209 days in a super-G at Kvitfjell in March 2011. That record was extended yet again at Kitzbühel in January 2012 to 37 years, 158 days.

On 19 January 2012 Cuche announced his retirement for the end of the 2012 season. He gave his retirement speech in Kitzbühel during which he stated that he wanted to "leave the World Cup stage on a high". Only two days later, Cuche won the Hahnenkamm race in Kitzbühel for the fifth time in his career, including his first World Cup win in 1998. The following week, Cuche won the downhill at Garmisch, Germany, for his twentieth World Cup victory. He extended the record for the oldest winner of a World Cup race with his 21st and last career victory in the super-G of Crans Montana on 24 February 2012 to 37 years, 192 days.

In December 2012, the Swiss ski federation announced that Cuche would work with his former teammates as a downhill coach after they suffered a slow start to the season.

== Personal life ==
Cuche's nephew, Robin Cuche, is a Paralympic alpine skier.

== Other awards ==
Cuche won the Swiss Sports Personality of the Year in 2009 and 2011. In January 2012 during the "Swiss Awards" he won the Swiss Person of the Year award in 2011.

== World Cup results ==
=== Season standings ===
Season	Age	Overall	Slalom	Giant slalom	Super-G	Downhill	Combined
1996	21	92	–	–	47	40	–
1997	22						
1998	23	8	–	–	6	4	11
1999	24	15	–	30	13	13	4
2000	25	12	–	12	9	11	17
2001	26	10	–	20	6	13	—
2002	27	4	–	4	2	14	—
2003	28	5	–	20	3	9	—
2004	29	13	–	24	10	9	10
2005	30	17	–	11	27	21	—
2006	31	34	–	24	28	18	—
2007	32	3	–	7	2	1	34
2008	33	3	–	4	2	1	23
2009	34	3	–	1	7	7	30
2010	35	3	–	9	8	1	27
2011	36	2	–	9	1	1	—
2012	37	6	–	30	2	3	—

=== Season titles ===
6 season titles: 4 downhill, 1 super-G, 1 giant slalom

Season	Discipline
2007	Downhill
2008	Downhill
2009	Giant slalom
2010	Downhill
2011	Downhill
2011	Super-G

=== Race victories ===
- 21 wins (12 downhill, 6 super-G, 3 giant slalom)
- 67 podiums (32 DH, 23 SG, 12 GS)

Season	Date	Location	Discipline
1998	23 Jan 1998	Kitzbühel, Austria	Downhill
2002	5 Jan 2002	Adelboden, Switzerland	Giant slalom
2002	7 Mar 2002	Altenmarkt, Austria	Super-G
2003	8 Dec 2002	Beaver Creek, USA	Super-G
2004	30 Jan 2004	Garmisch, Germany	Downhill
2007	10 Mar 2007	Kvitfjell, Norway	Downhill
2008	14 Dec 2007	Val Gardena, Italy	Super-G
2008	19 Jan 2008	Kitzbühel, Austria	Downhill
2009
2009	21 Feb 2009	Sestriere, Italy	Giant slalom
2010	25 Oct 2009	Sölden, Austria	Giant slalom
2010	28 Nov 2009	Lake Louise, Canada	Downhill
2010	22 Jan 2010	Kitzbühel, Austria	Super-G
2010	23 Jan 2010	Kitzbühel, Austria	Downhill
2010	6 Mar 2010	Kvitfjell, Norway	Downhill
2011	22 Jan 2011	Kitzbühel, Austria	Downhill
2011	29 Jan 2011	Chamonix, France	Downhill
2011	13 Mar 2011	Kvitfjell, Norway	Super-G
2012	26 Nov 2011	Lake Louise, Canada	Downhill
2012	21 Jan 2012	Kitzbühel, Austria	Downhill
2012	28 Jan 2012	Garmisch, Germany	Downhill
2012	24 Feb 2012	Crans-Montana, Switzerland	Super-G

== World Championship results ==
Year	Age	Slalom	Giant slalom	Super-G	Downhill	Combined
1999	24	—	—	8	14	—
2001	26	—	16	5	DNF	—
2003	28	—	12	11	4	—
2005	30					
2007	32	—	3	4	6	—
2009	34	—	6	1	2	—
2011	36	—	8	4	2	—

== Olympic results ==
Year	Age	Slalom	Giant slalom	Super-G	Downhill	Combined
1998	23	—	14	2	8	—
2002	27	—	10	DSQ	14	—
2006	31	—	19	12	—	—
2010	35	—	14	10	6	—

Awards and achievements
Preceded by Fabian Cancellara; Simon Ammann	Swiss Sportsman of the Year; 2009; 2011	Succeeded by Simon Ammann; Roger Federer
