= FIS Alpine World Ski Championships 2007 – Men's super combined =

Below are the results of the FIS Alpine World Ski Championships 2007 men's super combined race which took place on 8 February 2007.

== Results ==
Rank	Athlete	Nation	Downhill	Total	Behind
1	Daniel Albrecht	Switzerland	1:37.66	2:28.99	0
2	Benjamin Raich	Austria	1:38.24	2:29.07	+0.08
3	Marc Berthod	Switzerland	1:37.94	2:29.23	+0.24
4	Didier Défago	Switzerland	1:37.64	2:29.50	+0.51
5	Aksel Lund Svindal	Norway	1:36.84	2:29.59	+0.60
6	Bode Miller	United States	1:36.64	2:29.97	+0.98
7	Romed Baumann	Austria	1:38.21	2:29.98	+0.99
8	Silvan Zurbriggen	Switzerland	1:38.27	2:30.01	+1.02
9	Steven Nyman	United States	1:37.23	2:30.18	+1.19
10	Ondřej Bank	Czech Republic	1:38.41	2:30.21	+1.22
11	Mario Matt	Austria	1:39.26	2:30.34	+1.35
12	Ivica Kostelić	Croatia	1:38.62	2:30.39	+1.40
13	Peter Fill	Italy	1:37.71	2:30.40	+1.41
14	Jean-Baptiste Grange	France	1:39.53	2:30.58	+1.59
15	Lars Elton Myhre	Norway	1:38.64	2:30.59	+1.60
16	Rainer Schönfelder	Austria	1:38.31	2:30.60	+1.61
17	François Bourque	Canada	1:37.38	2:31.43	+2.44
18	Patrick Staudacher	Italy	1:37.70	2:31.54	+2.55
19	Ryan Semple	Canada	1:39.51	2:32.17	+3.18
20	Thomas Lanning	United States	1:40.15	2:32.47	+3.48
21	Andrej Jerman	Slovenia	1:37.95	2:32.53	+3.54
22	Michael Janyk	Canada	1:40.69	2:32.69	+3.70
23	Adrien Théaux	France	1:38.39	2:33.44	+4.45
24	Filip Trejbal	Czech Republic	1:41.30	2:33.64	+4.65
25	Noel Baxter	United Kingdom	1:40.44	2:33.81	+4.82
26	Petr Záhrobský	Czech Republic	1:39.55	2:35.44	+6.45
27	Ivan Heimschild	Slovakia	1:40.87	2:35.75	+6.76
28	Roger Vidosa	Andorra	1:41.92	2:36.47	+7.48
29	Niklas Rainer	Sweden	1:39.23	2:37.15	+8.16
30	Anton Konovalov	Russia	1:43.02	2:37.76	+8.77
31	Ivan Ratkić	Croatia	1:41.48	2:38.31	+9.32
32	John Kucera	Canada	1:38.41	2:38.53	+9.54
33	Alexey Chaadayev	Russia	1:43.70	2:40.23	+11.24
34	Wojciech Zagórski	Poland	1:44.88	2:40.67	+11.68
35	Cristián Anguita	Chile	1:44.27	2:41.81	+12.82
36	Akira Sasaki	Japan	1:41.48	2:43.20	+14.21
—	Michael Walchhofer	Austria	1:37.17	DNF	—
—	Aleš Gorza	Slovenia	1:38.56	DNF	—
—	Rok Perko	Slovenia	1:38.61	DNF	—
—	Andrej Šporn	Slovenia	1:38.82	DNF	—
—	Pierrick Bourgeat	France	1:38.95	DNF	—
—	Ted Ligety	United States	1:39.46	DNF	—
—	Jens Byggmark	Sweden	1:39.90	DNF	—
—	Andreas Romar	Finland	1:40.25	DNF	—
—	Aleksandr Khoroshilov	Russia	1:40.35	DNF	—
—	Cristian Javier Simari Birkner	Argentina	1:41.02	DNF	—
—	Hans Olsson	Sweden	1:41.06	DNF	—
—	Jouni Pellinen	Finland	1:41.52	DNF	—
—	Jaroslav Babušiak	Slovakia	1:43.09	DNF	—
—	Andrew Greig	New Zealand	1:44.91	DNF	—
—	Benjamin Griffin	New Zealand	1:45.32	DNF	—
—	Marco Büchel	Liechtenstein	1:38.02	DNS	—
—	Stephan Keppler	Germany	1:39.04	DNS	—
—	Finlay Mickel	United Kingdom	1:39.06	DNS	—
—	Bjarne Solbakken	Norway	1:39.34	DNS	—
—	Johannes Stehle	Germany	1:39.77	DNS	—
—	Maui Gayme	Chile	1:41.22	DNS	—
—	Christof Innerhofer	Italy	1:39.18	DQ	—
—	Pierre Paquin	France	1:38.30	DQ	—
—	Natko Zrnčić-Dim	Croatia	1:40.10	DQ	—
—	Markus Larsson	Sweden	DNF	—	—
—	Werner Heel	Italy	DNF	—	—
—	Christophe Roux	Moldova	DNF	—	—
—	Jorge Mandrú	Chile	DNF	—	—
—	Tin Široki	Croatia	DNF	—	—
—	Jan Wojtiuk	Poland	DNF	—	—
—	Martin Vráblík	Czech Republic	DNS	—	—
—	Mark Bridgwater	New Zealand	DNS	—	—
—	Konstantin Sats	Russia	DQ	—	—
