= FIS Alpine World Ski Championships 2007 – Men's super-G =

Below are the results of the FIS Alpine World Ski Championships 2007 men's super-g race, which took place on 6 February 2007.

== Results ==
Rank	Athlete	Nation	Time	Behind
1	Patrick Staudacher	Italy	1:14.30	0
2	Fritz Strobl	Austria	1:14.62	+0.32
3	Bruno Kernen	Switzerland	1:14.92	+0.62
4	Didier Cuche	Switzerland	1:14.93	+0.63
4	Christoph Gruber	Austria	1:14.93	+0.63
6	Erik Guay	Canada	1:14.95	+0.65
7	Jan Hudec	Canada	1:14.96	+0.66
7	Hermann Maier	Austria	1:14.96	+0.66
9	François Bourque	Canada	1:14.97	+0.67
10	Marco Büchel	Liechtenstein	1:14.99	+0.69
11	Mario Scheiber	Austria	1:15.09	+0.79
12	Steven Nyman	United States	1:15.20	+0.90
13	Aksel Lund Svindal	Norway	1:15.24	+0.94
14	Silvan Zurbriggen	Switzerland	1:15.31	+1.01
14	Peter Fill	Italy	1:15.31	+1.01
16	Massimiliano Blardone	Italy	1:15.38	+1.08
17	Patrik Järbyn	Sweden	1:15.45	+1.15
17	Didier Défago	Switzerland	1:15.45	+1.15
19	Bjarne Solbakken	Norway	1:15.46	+1.16
19	Aleš Gorza	Slovenia	1:15.46	+1.16
21	Hans Olsson	Sweden	1:15.52	+1.22
22	Gauthier de Tessières	France	1:15.60	+1.30
23	Andrej Jerman	Slovenia	1:15.63	+1.33
24	Bode Miller	United States	1:15.64	+1.34
25	Niklas Rainer	Sweden	1:15.65	+1.35
26	Adrien Théaux	France	1:15.71	+1.41
27	Werner Heel	Italy	1:15.74	+1.44
28	Matts Olsson	Sweden	1:15.81	+1.51
29	Antoine Dénériaz	France	1:15.84	+1.54
30	John Kucera	Canada	1:15.91	+1.61
31	Scott Macartney	United States	1:15.98	+1.68
31	Ted Ligety	United States	1:15.98	+1.68
33	Jouni Pellinen	Finland	1:16.12	+1.82
34	Thomas Lanning	United States	1:16.16	+1.86
35	Lars Elton Myhre	Norway	1:16.22	+1.92
36	Ondřej Bank	Czech Republic	1:16.23	+1.93
37	Stephan Keppler	Germany	1:16.24	+1.94
38	Noel Baxter	United Kingdom	1:16.56	+2.26
39	Johannes Stehle	Germany	1:16.66	+2.36
40	Natko Zrnčić-Dim	Croatia	1:16.74	+2.44
41	Mark Bridgwater	New Zealand	1:16.83	+2.53
42	Kryštof Krýzl	Czech Republic	1:16.98	+2.68
43	Aleksandr Khoroshilov	Russia	1:17.07	+2.77
44	Andrej Šporn	Slovenia	1:17.10	+2.80
45	Konstantin Sats	Russia	1:17.11	+2.81
46	Ivan Heimschild	Slovakia	1:17.17	+2.87
47	Filip Trejbal	Czech Republic	1:17.24	+2.94
48	Andreas Romar	Finland	1:17.27	+2.97
49	Jaroslav Babušiak	Slovakia	1:17.36	+3.06
50	Anton Konovalov	Russia	1:17.58	+3.28
51	Ivan Ratkić	Croatia	1:17.70	+3.40
52	Tin Široki	Croatia	1:17.78	+3.48
53	Maui Gayme	Chile	1:17.82	+3.52
54	Akira Sasaki	Japan	1:17.99	+3.69
55	Roger Vidosa	Andorra	1:18.03	+3.73
56	Will Clifford	Australia	1:18.23	+3.93
57	Benjamin Griffin	New Zealand	1:18.56	+4.26
58	Andrew Greig	New Zealand	1:18.69	+4.39
59	Alexey Chaadayev	Russia	1:18.90	+4.60
59	Brenton Fetterplace	Australia	1:18.90	+4.60
61	Christophe Roux	Moldova	1:19.18	+4.88
62	Cristán Anguita	Chile	1:19.38	+5.08
63	Jorge Martinic	Chile	1:19.49	+5.19
64	Jorge Mandrú	Chile	1:19.69	+5.39
-	Pierre-Emmanuel Dalcin	France	DNF	
-	Johnny Albertsen	Denmark	DNF	
-	Petr Záhrobský	Czech Republic	DNF	
-	Rok Perko	Slovenia	DNF	
-	Finlay Mickel	United Kingdom	DNF	
