= Mikhail Sedyankov =

Bulgarian alpine skier (born 1982)

Personal information
- Nationality: Bulgarian
- Born: 8 April 1982 (age 42); Devin, Bulgaria

Sport
- Sport: Alpine skiing

Mikhail Sedyankov (Bulgarian: Михаил Седянков, born 8 April 1982) is a Bulgarian alpine skier. He competed in two events at the 2006 Winter Olympics.
