= Ivan Olivari =

Croatian alpine skier (born 1987)

Personal information
- Nationality: Croatian
- Born: 28 January 1987 (age 38); Zagreb, SR Croatia, SFR Yugoslavia

Sport
- Sport: Alpine skiing

Ivan Olivari (born 28 January 1987) is a Croatian alpine skier. He competed in the men's super-G at the 2006 Winter Olympics.
