= Renārs Doršs =

Latvian alpine skier (born 1985)

Personal information
- Nationality: Latvian
- Born: 13 October 1985 (age 40) Sigulda, Latvian SSR, Soviet Union

Sport
- Sport: Alpine skiing

Renārs Doršs (born 13 October 1985) is a Latvian alpine skier. He competed in two events at the 2006 Winter Olympics.
