= Michał Kałwa =

Polish alpine skier (born 1978)

Personal information
- Nationality: Polish
- Born: 9 August 1978 (age 46); Poznań, Poland

Sport
- Sport: Alpine skiing

Michał Kałwa (born 9 August 1978) is a Polish alpine skier. He competed in four events at the 2006 Winter Olympics.
