= Alpine skiing at the 2010 Winter Olympics – Men's super-G =

Men's super-G at the XXI Olympic Winter Games
- Pictogram for alpine skiing
- Venue: Whistler Creekside
- Date: February 19, 2010
- Competitors: 64 from 28 nations
- Winning time: 1:30.34

Medalists
1st place, gold medalist(s)		Aksel Lund Svindal	Norway
2nd place, silver medalist(s)		Bode Miller	United States
3rd place, bronze medalist(s)		Andrew Weibrecht	United States

Men's super-G
- Interactive map of Men's super-G
- Location: Whistler Creekside; Dave Murray Super-G
- Vertical: 615 m (2,018 ft)
- Top elevation: 1,440 m (4,724 ft)
- Base elevation: 825 m (2,707 ft)

The men's super-G competition of the Vancouver 2010 Olympics was held at Whistler Creekside in Whistler, British Columbia, on Friday, February 19.

The defending Olympic champion was Kjetil André Aamodt of Norway, since retired, and the reigning world champion was Didier Cuche of Switzerland. Norway's Aksel Lund Svindal was the defending World Cup Super-G champion and led the current season, ahead of Michael Walchhofer of Austria and Cuche.

Svindal won the gold medal, Bode Miller of the United States took the silver, and the bronze medalist was U.S. teammate Andrew Weibrecht; Cuche was tenth and Walchhofer was 21st. Svindal and Miller had both medaled in the downhill, each one place lower, behind Didier Défago, who was fifteenth in the super-G.

The vertical drop of the Dave Murray Super-G course was 615 m (2,018 ft), starting at an elevation of 1,440 m (4,724 ft) above sea level, with a length of 2.200 km (1.37 mi). Svindal's winning time of 90.34 seconds yielded an average course speed of 87.669 km/h (54.5 mph), with an average vertical descent speed of 6.808 m/s (22.3 ft/s).

The course was labelled as technically difficult, and eighteen did not finish the race. Patrik Järbyn of Sweden crashed badly during the race, flying in the air and landing heavily on his back. He suffered a concussion and was transferred to a hospital.

== Results ==
The race was started at 11:30 local time, (UTC −8). At the starting gate, the skies were clear, the temperature was 3.5 °C (38 °F), and the snow condition was hard packed; the temperature at the finish was 9.1 °C (48 °F).

Rank	Bib	Name	Country	Time	Difference
1st place, gold medalist(s)	19	Aksel Lund Svindal	Norway	1:30.34	—
2nd place, silver medalist(s)	11	Bode Miller	United States	1:30.62	+0.28
3rd place, bronze medalist(s)	3	Andrew Weibrecht	United States	1:30.65	+0.31
4	18	Werner Heel	Italy	1:30.67	+0.33
5	20	Erik Guay	Canada	1:30.68	+0.34
6	13	Christof Innerhofer	Italy	1:30.73	+0.39
7	9	Patrick Staudacher	Italy	1:30.74	+0.40
8	15	Carlo Janka	Switzerland	1:30.83	+0.49
9	14	Tobias Grünenfelder	Switzerland	1:30.90	+0.56
10	16	Didier Cuche	Switzerland	1:31.06	+0.72
11	6	Aleš Gorza	Slovenia	1:31.07	+0.73
12	1	Kjetil Jansrud	Norway	1:31.21	+0.87
13	7	Adrien Théaux	France	1:31.24	+0.90
14	17	Benjamin Raich	Austria	1:31.35	+1.01
15	22	Didier Défago	Switzerland	1:31.43	+1.09
16	23	Ivica Kostelić	Croatia	1:31.47	+1.13
17	24	Georg Streitberger	Austria	1:31.49	+1.15
18	28	Andrej Šporn	Slovenia	1:31.58	+1.24
19	8	Ted Ligety	United States	1:31.70	+1.36
20	10	Mario Scheiber	Austria	1:31.93	+1.59
21	21	Michael Walchhofer	Austria	1:32.00	+1.66
22	36	Guillermo Fayed	France	1:32.03	+1.69
23	26	Marco Sullivan	United States	1:32.09	+1.75
23	32	Jan Hudec	Canada	1:32.09	+1.75
25	39	Lars Elton Myhre	Norway	1:32.36	+2.02
26	43	Ivan Ratkić	Croatia	1:32.67	+2.33
27	42	Ferran Terra	Spain	1:32.75	+2.41
28	53	Aleksandr Khoroshilov	Russia	1:32.84	+2.50
29	40	Craig Branch	Australia	1:32.89	+2.55
30	34	Jono Brauer	Australia	1:32.92	+2.58
31	5	Gauthier de Tessieres	France	1:33.17	+2.83
32	33	Edward Drake	Great Britain	1:33.20	+2.86
33	57	Roger Vidosa	Andorra	1:33.65	+3.31
34	31	Petr Záhrobský	Czech Republic	1:33.83	+3.49
35	52	Paul de la Cuesta	Spain	1:34.03	+3.69
36	50	Stepan Zuev	Russia	1:34.13	+3.79
37	51	Jaroslav Babušiak	Slovakia	1:35.25	+4.91
38	45	Tim Cafe	New Zealand	1:35.55	+5.21
39	64	Kevin Esteve Rigail	Andorra	1:35.67	+5.33
40	48	Johnny Albertsen	Denmark	1:35.69	+5.35
41	58	Stefan Georgiev	Bulgaria	1:36.32	+5.98
42	44	Maui Gayme	Chile	1:36.56	+6.22
43	60	Igor Zakurdaev	Kazakhstan	1:36.97	+6.63
44	59	Andrei Drygin	Tajikistan	1:38.03	+7.69
45	62	Stefan Jon Sigurgeirsson	Iceland	1:39.12	+8.78
	2	Stephan Keppler	Germany	DNF	
	12	Manuel Osborne-Paradis	Canada	DNF	
	25	Andrej Jerman	Slovenia	DNF	
	27	Robbie Dixon	Canada	DNF	
	29	Patrik Järbyn	Sweden	DNF	
	30	Marco Büchel	Liechtenstein	DNF	
	37	Natko Zrnčić-Dim	Croatia	DNF	
	38	Hans Olsson	Sweden	DNF	
	41	David Poisson	France	DNF	
	46	Andreas Romar	Finland	DNF	
	47	Benjamin Griffin	New Zealand	DNF	
	54	Truls Ove Karlsen	Norway	DNF	
	55	Sergei Maitakov	Russia	DNF	
	61	Jorge Mandrú	Chile	DNF	
	63	Arni Thorvaldsson	Iceland	DNF	
	4	Peter Fill	Italy	DSQ	
	35	Andrej Križaj	Slovenia	DSQ	
	56	Martin Vráblík	Czech Republic	DSQ	
	49	Cristian Javier Simari Birkner	Argentina	DNS	
