= Mykola Skriabin =

Ukrainian alpine skier (born 1978)

Personal information
- Nationality: Ukrainian
- Born: 17 December 1978 (age 46); Lviv, Ukrainian SSR, Soviet Union
- Height: 186 cm (6 ft 1 in)
- Weight: 85 kg (187 lb)

Sport
- Sport: Alpine skiing

Mykola Ihorovych Skriabin (born 17 December 1978) is a Ukrainian alpine skier. He competed at the 1998, 2002 and the 2006 Winter Olympics. His younger sister, Anastasiya Skryabina, is also an Olympic alpine skier.
