= Konstantin Sats =

Russian alpine skier (born 1982)

Konstantin Sats (born 28 April 1982 in Partizansky District, Krasnoyarsk Krai) is a former Russian alpine skier who competed in the 2006 Winter Olympics.
