= Anton Konovalov =

Russian alpine skier (born 1985)

Anton Konovalov (born 18 January 1985) is a Russian former alpine skier who competed in the 2006 Winter Olympics.
