= Ivan Ratkić =

Croatian alpine skier (born 1986)

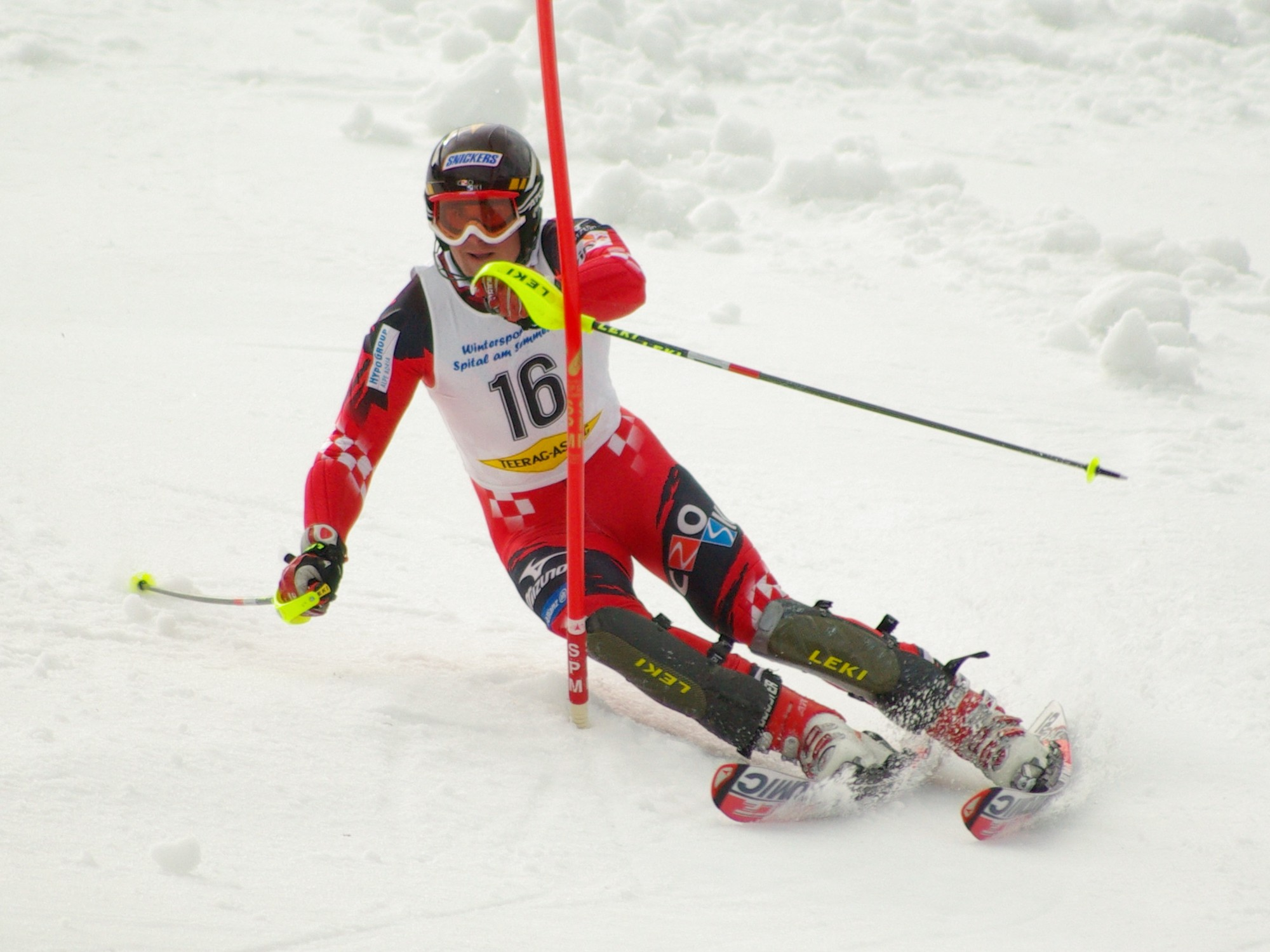
Ivan Ratkić

Ivan Ratkić (born 22 February 1986) is a former Croatian alpine skier.

Ratkić was born in Zagreb, at the time in SR Croatia, SFR Yugoslavia. He is a member of SK Medveščak. Ratkić has competed at the 2006 and 2010 Winter Olympics. He competed at the FIS Alpine World Ski Championships on three occasions. His best result is 13th place in super combined at the 2009 World Championships in Val d'Isere, France.

His best World Cup result is 30th position at the super combined race in Beaver Creek in 2009. He has entered 9 World Cup races in his career.
