= FIS Alpine World Ski Championships 2009 =

Skiing event in Val-d'Isère, Savoie, France

Coordinates: 45.447°N 6.976°E

40th FIS Alpine World Ski Championships
- Host city: Val-d'Isère, Savoie
- Country: France
- Nations: 70
- Athletes: 382
- Events: 11
- Opening: 2 February 2009
- Closing: 15 February 2009
- Opened by: Nicolas Sarkozy
- Main venue: Bellevarde (& Rhône-Alpes)

Location in France
Location in the Alps of Europe

The FIS Alpine World Ski Championships 2009 were the 40th FIS Alpine World Ski Championships, held 2–15 February in France at Val-d'Isère, Savoie.

The International Ski Federation (FIS) awarded the championships to Val-d'Isère on 2 June 2004, in Miami, Florida. The other two finalists were Vail/Beaver Creek, USA, and Schladming, Austria, which was later selected to host the 2013 championships. Vail/Beaver Creek gained the 2015 championships.

These were the first world championships at Val-d'Isère, although the area hosted four of the five men's events at the 1992 Winter Olympics in Albertville (the slalom was held at Les Menuires). Val-d'Isère is a regular stop on the World Cup circuit, usually by the men in early to mid-December.

These were the fourth world championships held in France. Chamonix hosted in 1937 and 1962, and Chamrousse hosted the alpine events for 1968 Winter Olympics (from 1948 through 1980, the Winter Olympics were also the world championships).

== Venues ==
- The men's events were held at Bellevarde, as were the women's giant slalom and slalom. The other three women's events were conducted at Rhône-Alpes.

Course information – (metric)
Date	Race	Start elevation	Finish elevation	Vertical drop	Course length	Average gradient
Sat 07-Feb	Downhill – men	2807 m	1848 m	959 m	2.988 km	32.1%
Mon 09-Feb	Downhill – women	2536	1845	691	2.227	31.0
Mon 09-Feb	Downhill (SC) – men	2550	1848	702	2.549	27.5
Fri 06-Feb	Downhill (SC) – women	2536	1845	691	2.227	31.0
Wed 04-Feb	Super-G – men	2498	1848	650	1.770	36.7
Tue 03-Feb	Super-G – women	2445	1845	600	1.926	31.2
Fri 13-Feb	Giant slalom – men	2292	1842	450
Thu 12-Feb	Giant slalom – women	2225	1865	360
Sun 15-Feb	Slalom – men	2062	1842	220
Sat 14-Feb	Slalom – women	2042	1842	200
Mon 09-Feb	Slalom (SC) – men	2032	1842	190
Fri 06-Feb	Slalom (SC) – women	2035	1840	195

Course information – (imperial)
Date	Race	Start elevation	Finish elevation	Vertical drop	Course length	Average gradient
Sat 07-Feb	Downhill – men	9209 ft	6063 ft	3146 ft	1.886 mi.	32.1%
Mon 09-Feb	Downhill – women	8320	6053	2267	1.384	31.0
Mon 09-Feb	Downhill (SC) – men	8366	6063	2303	1.584	27.5
Fri 06-Feb	Downhill (SC) – women	8320	6053	2267	1.384	31.0
Wed 04-Feb	Super-G – men	8196	6063	2133	1.100	36.7
Tue 03-Feb	Super-G – women	8022	6053	1969	1.197	31.2
Fri 13-Feb	Giant slalom – men	7520	6043	1477
Thu 12-Feb	Giant slalom – women	7300	6119	1181
Sun 15-Feb	Slalom – men	6765	6043	722
Sat 14-Feb	Slalom – women	6699	6043	656
Mon 09-Feb	Slalom (SC) – men	6666	6043	623
Fri 06-Feb	Slalom (SC) – women	6677	6037	640

== Medal winners ==
=== Men's events ===
Event	Gold		Silver		Bronze	
Downhill details	John Kucera; Canada	2:07.01	Didier Cuche; Switzerland	2:07.05	Carlo Janka; Switzerland	2:07.18
Super-G details	Didier Cuche; Switzerland	1:19.41	Peter Fill; Italy	1:20.40	Aksel Lund Svindal; Norway	1:20.43
Giant slalom details	Carlo Janka; Switzerland	2:18.82	Benjamin Raich; Austria	2:19.53	Ted Ligety; United States	2:19.81
Slalom details	Manfred Pranger; Austria	1.44.17	Julien Lizeroux; France	1.44.48	Michael Janyk; Canada	1.45.70
Super combined details	Aksel Lund Svindal; Norway	2:23.00	Julien Lizeroux; France	2:23.90	Natko Zrnčić-Dim; Croatia	2:24.58

=== Women's events ===
Event	Gold		Silver		Bronze	
Downhill details	Lindsey Vonn; United States	1:30.31	Lara Gut; Switzerland	1:30.83	Nadia Fanchini; Italy	1:30.88
Super-G details	Lindsey Vonn; United States	1:20.73	Marie Marchand-Arvier; France	1:21.07	Andrea Fischbacher; Austria	1:21.13
Giant slalom details	Kathrin Hölzl; Germany	2:03.49	Tina Maze; Slovenia	2:03.58	Tanja Poutiainen; Finland	2:04.03
Slalom details	Maria Riesch; Germany	1:51.80	Šárka Záhrobská; Czech Republic	1:52.57	Tanja Poutiainen; Finland	1:52.89
Super combined details	Kathrin Zettel; Austria	2:20.13	Lara Gut; Switzerland	2:20.69	Elisabeth Görgl; Austria	2:21.01

=== Team event ===
Event	Gold		Silver		Bronze	
Team event Canceled – poor weather	N/A	N/A	N/A	N/A	N/A	N/A

== Medal table ==
* Host nation (France)

Rank	Nation	Gold	Silver	Bronze	Total
1	Switzerland (SUI)	2	3	1	6
2	Austria (AUT)	2	1	2	5
3	United States (USA)	2	0	1	3
4	Germany (GER)	2	0	0	2
5	Canada (CAN)	1	0	1	2
5	Norway (NOR)	1	0	1	2
7	France (FRA)*	0	3	0	3
8	Italy (ITA)	0	1	1	2
9	Czech Republic (CZE)	0	1	0	1
9	Slovenia (SLO)	0	1	0	1
11	Finland (FIN)	0	0	2	2
12	Croatia (CRO)	0	0	1	1
Totals (12 entries)		10	10	10	30
