= Hahnenkamm, Kitzbühel =

Mountain in Tyrol, Austria

Hahnenkamm
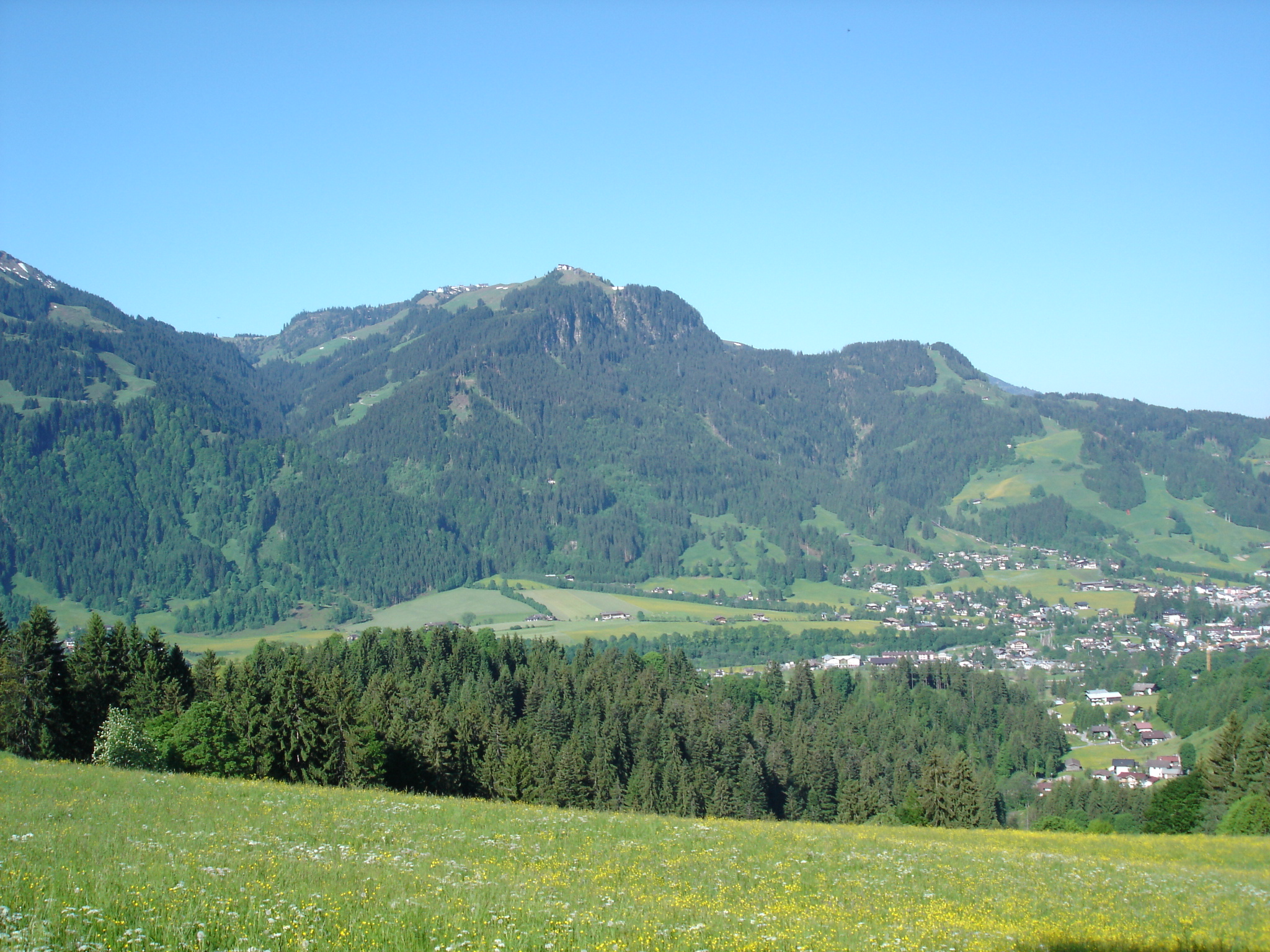
- Hahnenkamm above Kitzbühel, May 2005

Highest point
- Elevation: 1,712 m (5,617 ft)
- Coordinates: 47°25′27″N 12°21′55″E

Geography
- Location within Austria
- Location: Tyrol, Austria
- Parent range: Kitzbühel Alps

Location in the Alps of Europe

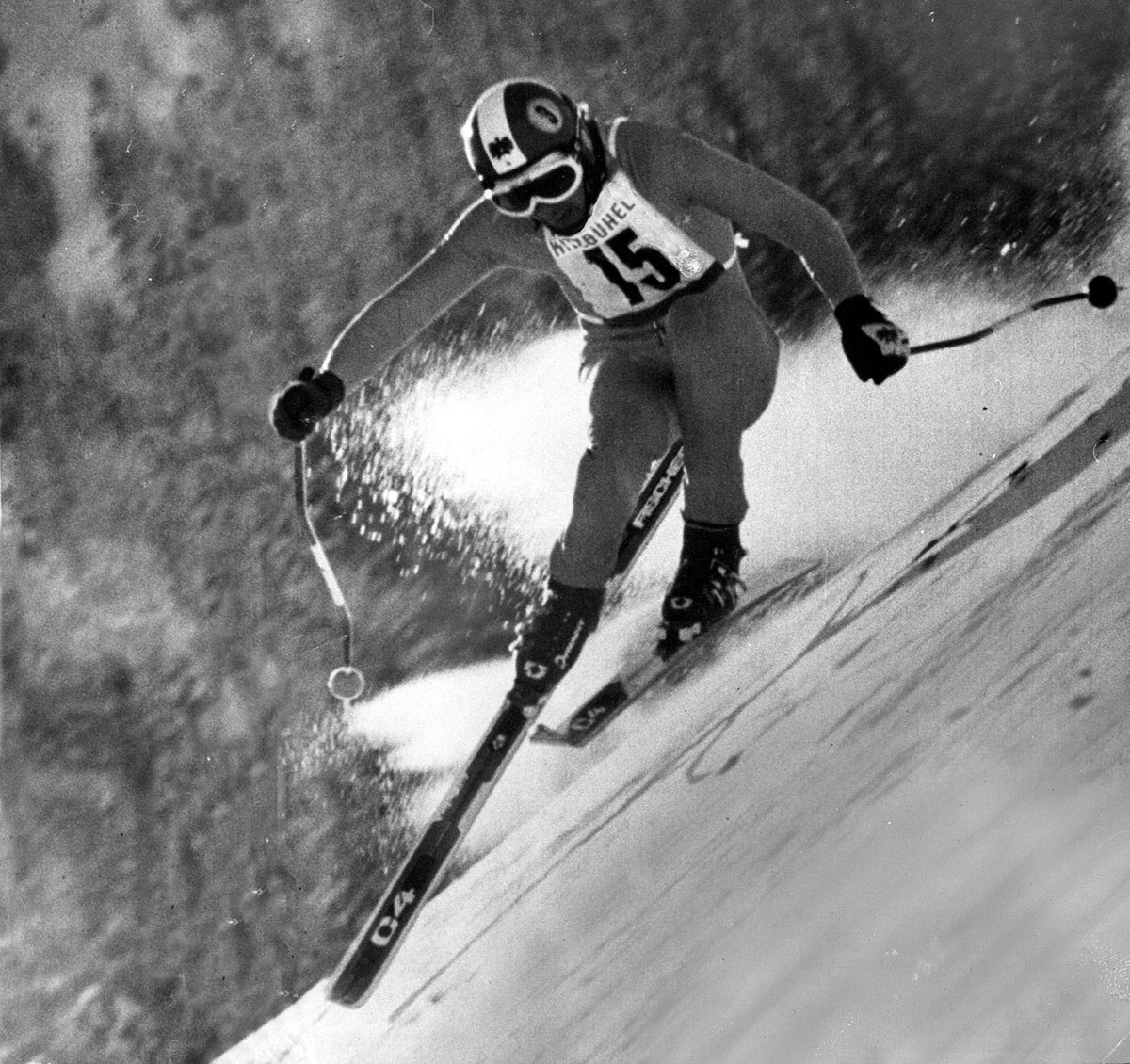
Franz Klammer in 1976, the second of his four Streif wins

The Hahnenkamm is a mountain in Europe, directly southwest of Kitzbühel in the Kitzbühel Alps of Austria. The elevation of its summit is 1,712 metres (5,617 ft) above sea level.

The Hahnenkamm (German: rooster's comb) is part of the ski resort of Kitzbühel, and hosts an annual World Cup alpine ski race, the Hahnenkammrennen. The most famous slope on the Hahnenkamm is the classic downhill course, the Streif (streak, or stripe), which is regarded as the most demanding race course on the World Cup circuit. The course features highly technical, "fall-away" turns (reverse bank), many with limited visibility. It also contains several flat gliding sections, immediately preceded by difficult turns, placing a premium on both technical and gliding skills. The Streif is located on the mountain's northeast face which in January is mostly in the shade, adding the difficulty of flat vision to the already exceptionally demanding run.

== Hahnenkamm races ==
The Hahnenkammrennen are the annual races, held since 1931 and a fixture of the men's World Cup since its inception in the 1967 season. The races were originally held in March, and sometimes in early February (1949 & 1951). Beginning in 1953, the races at Kitzbühel have been held in mid to late January, often the week following the Lauberhorn in Wengen, Switzerland, another classic downhill.

Since 1959, the race has been broadcast on Austrian television.

In 2009, as well as in 2008, the total prize money was €550,000.

The Hahnenkamm races are currently held in the following disciplines:

- Super-G on the Streifalm, on Friday
- Downhill on the Streif, on Saturday
- Slalom on the Ganslernhang, on Sunday

Traditionally, the winner of the Hahnenkamm race was determined by the combined results of the downhill and slalom competitions. During the World Cup era, the man most likely to be referred to as Hahnenkammsieger (champion) is the winner of the prestigious downhill race.

The Super-G made its debut at Kitzbühel 31 years ago in 1995, and returned as a regular event in 2000, scheduled the day before the downhill.

Because of challenging weather conditions in January at the top of the mountain, the downhill course is often not run in its entirety. In the decade of 2000–09, the Streif full course was run in only four of the ten years (2001, 2002, 2004, & 2009). Unfortunately, this often eliminates one of the most exciting jumps in ski racing, the Mausefalle (mousetrap), seconds from the top of the course.

The competitors reach high speeds quickly out of the starting gate on the Startschuss and fly up to 40 m (130 ft) off the steep jump. Upon landing the racers experience a severe compression immediately followed by a sharp left turn, often negotiated unsuccessfully. Speeds entering the turn are 55–60 mph (90–100 km/h).

== Vertical Up ==
In the open Streif VerticalUp event, first held in 2011, participants race the Streif upwards to the start booth of the ski race, with free choice of equipment (cross-country skis, shoes with spikes, etc).
