= Alpine skiing at the 2006 Winter Olympics =

Alpine skiing at the XX Olympic Winter Games
- Venue: Sestriere and Cesana-San Sicario; Turin, Piedmont, Italy
- Dates: 12–25 February 2006
- No. of events: 10
- Competitors: 287 (168 men, 80 women) from 60 nations

Location in the Alps of Europe
Locations in Piedmont

Alpine skiing at the 2006 Winter Olympics consisted of ten events, held at Sestriere and Cesana-San Sicario, Italy. The races were held 12–25 February 2006.

== Medal table ==
Rank	Nation	Gold	Silver	Bronze	Total
1	Austria	4	5	5	14
2	United States	2	0	0	2
3	Croatia	1	2	0	3
4	France	1	1	0	2
5	Sweden	1	0	3	4
6	Norway	1	0	0	1
7	Switzerland	0	1	2	3
8	Finland	0	1	0	1
Totals (8 entries)		10	10	10	30

=== Men's events ===
Event	Gold		Silver		Bronze	
Downhill	Antoine Dénériaz; France	1:48.80	Michael Walchhofer; Austria	1:49.52	Bruno Kernen; Switzerland	1:49.82
Combined	Ted Ligety; United States	3:09.35	Ivica Kostelić; Croatia	3:09.88	Rainer Schönfelder; Austria	3:10.67
Super-G	Kjetil André Aamodt; Norway	1:30.65	Hermann Maier; Austria	1:30.78	Ambrosi Hoffmann; Switzerland	1:30.98
Giant slalom	Benjamin Raich; Austria	2:35.00	Joël Chenal; France	2:35.07	Hermann Maier; Austria	2:35.16
Slalom	Benjamin Raich; Austria	1:43.14	Reinfried Herbst; Austria	1:43.97	Rainer Schönfelder; Austria	1:44.15

=== Women's events ===
Event	Gold		Silver		Bronze	
Downhill	Michaela Dorfmeister; Austria	1:56.49	Martina Schild; Switzerland	1:56.86	Anja Pärson; Sweden	1:57.13
Combined	Janica Kostelić; Croatia	2:51.08	Marlies Schild; Austria	2:51.58	Anja Pärson; Sweden	2:51.63
Super-G	Michaela Dorfmeister; Austria	1:32.47	Janica Kostelić; Croatia	1:32.74	Alexandra Meissnitzer; Austria	1:33.06
Giant slalom	Julia Mancuso; United States	2:09.19	Tanja Poutiainen; Finland	2:09.86	Anna Ottosson; Sweden	2:10.33
Slalom	Anja Pärson; Sweden	1:29.04	Nicole Hosp; Austria	1:29.33	Marlies Schild; Austria	1:29.79

== Participating NOCs ==
Fifty-eight nations contributed alpine skiers to the events at Torino.

- Albania
- Algeria
- Andorra
- Armenia
- Australia
- Austria
- Bosnia and Herzegovina
- Brazil
- Bulgaria
- Canada
- Chile
- China
- Croatia
- Cyprus
- Czech Republic
- Estonia
- Finland
- France
- Georgia
- Germany
- Great Britain
- Greece
- Hungary
- Iceland
- India
- Iran
- Ireland
- Israel
- Italy
- Japan
- Kazakhstan
- Kyrgyzstan
- Latvia
- Lebanon
- Liechtenstein
- Lithuania
- Madagascar
- Macedonia
- Monaco
- New Zealand
- Norway
- Poland
- Romania
- Russia
- Senegal
- Serbia and Montenegro
- Slovakia
- Slovenia
- South Africa
- South Korea
- Spain
- Sweden
- Switzerland
- Tajikistan
- Turkey
- Ukraine
- United States
- Uzbekistan

== Course information ==
Date	Race	Start elevation	Finish elevation	Vertical drop	Course length	Average gradient
Sun 12 Feb	Downhill – men	2,800 m (9,186 ft)	1,886 m (6,188 ft)	914 m (2,999 ft)	3.299 km (2.050 mi)	27.7%
Wed 15 Feb	Downhill – women	2,538 m (8,327 ft)	1,738 m (5,702 ft)	800 m (2,625 ft)	3.058 km (1.900 mi)	26.2%
Tue 14 Feb	Downhill (K) – men	2,686 m (8,812 ft)	1,886 m (6,188 ft)	800 m (2,625 ft)	2.965 km (1.842 mi)	27.0%
Sat 18 Feb	Downhill (K) – women	2,286 m (7,500 ft)	1,738 m (5,702 ft)	548 m (1,798 ft)	2.331 km (1.448 mi)	23.5%
Sat 18 Feb	Super-G – men	2,536 m (8,320 ft)	1,886 m (6,188 ft)	650 m (2,133 ft)	2.325 km (1.445 mi)	28.0%
Mon 20 Feb	Super-G – women	2,286 m (7,500 ft)	1,738 m (5,702 ft)	548 m (1,798 ft)	2.331 km (1.448 mi)	23.5%
Mon 20 Feb	Giant slalom – men	2,480 m (8,136 ft)	2,030 m (6,660 ft)	450 m (1,476 ft)		
Fri 24 Feb	Giant slalom – women	2,370 m (7,776 ft)	2,030 m (6,660 ft)	340 m (1,115 ft)		
Sat 25 Feb	Slalom – men	2,240 m (7,349 ft)	2,030 m (6,660 ft)	210 m (689 ft)		
Wed 22 Feb	Slalom – women	2,210 m (7,251 ft)	2,030 m (6,660 ft)	180 m (591 ft)		
Tue 14 Feb	Slalom (K) – men	2,210 m (7,251 ft)	2,030 m (6,660 ft)	180 m (591 ft)		
Fri 17 Feb	Slalom (K) – women	2,170 m (7,119 ft)	2,030 m (6,660 ft)	140 m (459 ft)		

== Qualification ==
All entries had to be submitted to the organizing committee by 30 January 2006.

In general, athletes must be among the top 500 in the world in their event to compete. They must also have no more than 120 FIS points. Each National Olympic Committee may enter up to 22 athletes, but not more than 14 men or 14 women. No more than 4 athletes from any NOC may compete in each event.

If an NOC has fewer than 2 athletes qualified under those rules, it may send one male and one female athlete with an FIS score of no more than 140 in the slalom or giant slalom event.

== See also ==
- Alpine skiing at the 2006 Winter Paralympics
- List of Olympic medalists in alpine skiing
