= 2007 Alpine Skiing World Cup – Men's super-G =

2007 Men's Super G World Cup
Previous: 2006	Next: 2008

Men's super G World Cup 2006/2007

== Calendar ==
Round	Race No	Place	Country	Date	Winner	Second	Third
1	3	Lake Louise	Canada	November 26, 2006	(Canada) John Kucera	(Austria) Mario Scheiber	(Sweden) Patrik Järbyn
2	9	Val Gardena	Italy	December 15, 2006	(United States) Bode Miller	(Austria) Christoph Gruber	(Canada) John Kucera
3	13	Hinterstoder	Austria	December 20, 2006	(United States) Bode Miller	(Italy) Peter Fill	(Austria) Hermann Maier
4	32	Kvitfjell	Norway	March 11, 2007	(Austria) Hans Grugger	(Austria) Mario Scheiber	(Switzerland) Didier Cuche
5	34	Lenzerheide	Switzerland	March 15, 2007	(Norway) Aksel Lund Svindal	(Austria) Benjamin Raich	(Canada) Erik Guay

== Final point standings ==
In men's super G World Cup 2006/07 all results count.

Place	Name	Country	Total points	3 (Canada)	9 (Italy)	13 (Austria)	32 (Norway)	34 (Switzerland)
1	Bode Miller	United States	304	18	100	100	36	50
2	Didier Cuche	Switzerland	208	29	50	29	60	40
3	John Kucera	Canada	194	100	60	2	16	16
4	Mario Scheiber	Austria	190	80	10	-	80	20
5	Aksel Lund Svindal	Norway	181	12	45	24	-	100
6	Hermann Maier	Austria	177	50	-	60	45	22
7	Christoph Gruber	Austria	153	16	80	12	13	32
8	Marco Büchel	Liechtenstein	146	10	10	40	36	50
9	Peter Fill	Italy	143	24	36	80	3	-
10	Erik Guay	Canada	136	40	18	18	-	60
	Georg Streitberger	Austria	136	9	40	36	15	36
12	Hans Grugger	Austria	124	-	-	-	100	24
13	Benjamin Raich	Austria	106	26	-	-	-	80
14	Didier Défago	Switzerland	100	36	14	12	20	18
15	Fritz Strobl	Austria	94	-	20	45	29	-
16	Antoine Dénériaz	France	85	45	13	26	1	-
17	Bruno Kernen	Switzerland	83	32	11	-	40	-
18	Silvan Zurbriggen	Switzerland	79	-	29	50	-	-
19	Patrik Järbyn	Sweden	78	60	-	-	18	-
20	Matthias Lanzinger	Austria	76	14	22	-	11	29
21	Michael Walchhofer	Austria	75	20	5	-	50	-
22	François Bourque	Canada	74	-	24	-	24	26
23	Stephan Keppler	Germany	58	4	32	-	22	-
24	Hannes Reichelt	Austria	56	15	15	-	26	-
25	Steven Nyman	United States	47	11	29	-	7	-
26	Patrick Staudacher	Italy	40	1	7	32	-	-
27	Pierre-Emmanuel Dalcin	France	34	-	12	14	8	-
	Walter Girardi	Italy	34	2	3	20	9	-
29	Jan Hudec	Canada	31	4	16	-	11	-
30	Andrej Sporn	Slovenia	25	22	-	-	3	-
31	Daniel Albrecht	Switzerland	22	-	-	22	-	-
32	Werner Heel	Italy	19	7	-	-	12	-
33	Andrej Jerman	Slovenia	18	8	10	-	-	-
	Michael Gufler	Italy	18	5	-	13	-	-
35	Gauthier de Tessières	France	16	-	-	16	-	-
36	Marc Berthod	Switzerland	15	-	-	15	-	-
37	Scott Macartney	United States	14	-	-	-	14	-
38	Ambrosi Hoffmann	Switzerland	13	13	-	-	-	-
	Hans Olsson	Sweden	13	-	6	-	7	-
	Christof Innerhofer	Italy	13	-	-	9	4	-
41	Thomas Lanning	United States	12	-	-	12	-	-
42	Adrien Theaux	France	10	-	4	6	-	-
43	Niklas Rainer	Sweden	8	-	-	8	-	-
44	Massimiliano Blardone	Italy	7	-	-	-	7	-
	Florian Eisath	Italy	7	-	-	7	-	-
46	Stefan Guay	Canada	6	6	-	-	-	-
47	Alex Happacher	Italy	5	-	1	4	-	-
	Olivier Brand	Switzerland	5	-	-	5	-	-
49	Jouni Pellenen	Finland	3	-	-	3	-	-
	Christoph Alster	Austria	3	-	3	-	-	-
51	Jeffrey Frisch	Canada	2	-	-	2	-	-

Note: In the last race only the best racers were allowed to compete and only the best 15 finishers were awarded with points.

== Men's super G team results ==
bold = highest score italics = race wins

Place	Country	Total points	3 (Canada)	9 (Italy)	13 (Austria)	32 (Norway)	34 (Switzerland)	Racers	Wins
1	Austria	1190	230	195	153	**369**	243	11	1
2	Switzerland	525	110	104	133	120	58	8	0
3	Canada	443	150	118	22	51	102	6	1
4	United States	377	29	129	112	57	50	4	2
5	Italy	286	39	47	165	35	-	9	0
6	Norway	181	12	45	24	-	100	1	1
7	Liechtenstein	146	10	10	40	36	50	1	0
8	France	145	45	29	62	9	-	4	0
9	Sweden	99	60	6	8	25	-	3	0
10	Germany	58	4	32	-	22	-	1	0
11	Slovenia	43	30	10	-	3	-	2	0
12	Finland	3	-	-	3	-	-	1	0

**Alpine skiing World Cup**
**Men**

Overall | Downhill | Super G | Giant slalom | Slalom | Combined

**2007**
