= 2007 Alpine Skiing World Cup – Men's downhill =

2007 Men's downhill World Cup
Previous: 2006	Next: 2008

The 2007 Alpine Skiing World Cup – Men's downhill season involved 10 events at sites in North America and Europe between November 2006 and March 2007. Swiss's Didier Cuche won the individual title, while his Austrian team took the team title.

== Calendar ==
Round	Race No	Place	Country	Date	Winner	Second	Third
1	3	Lake Louise	Canada	November 25, 2006	(Liechtenstein) Marco Büchel	(Canada) Manuel Osborne-Paradis	(Italy) Peter Fill
2	6	Beaver Creek	United States	December 1, 2006	(United States) Bode Miller	(Switzerland) Didier Cuche	(United States) Steven Nyman
3	11	Val Gardena	Italy	December 16, 2006	(United States) Steven Nyman	(Switzerland) Didier Cuche	(Austria) Fritz Strobl
4	16	Bormio	Italy	December 28, 2006	(Austria) Michael Walchhofer	(Switzerland) Didier Cuche	(Austria) Mario Scheiber
5	17	Bormio	Italy	December 29, 2006	(Austria) Michael Walchhofer	(Italy) Peter Fill	(Austria) Mario Scheiber
6	20	Wengen	Switzerland	January 13, 2007	(United States) Bode Miller	(Switzerland) Didier Cuche	(Italy) Peter Fill
7	22	Val d'Isère	France	January 20, 2007	(France) Pierre-Emmanuel Dalcin	(Canada) Erik Guay	(Canada) Manuel Osborne-Paradis
8	28	Garmisch	Germany	February 23, 2007	(Slovenia) Andrej Jerman	(Austria) Hans Grugger	(Canada) Erik Guay
9	29	Garmisch	Germany	February 24, 2007	(Canada) Erik Guay	(Slovenia) Andrej Jerman	(Switzerland) Didier Cuche
10	34	Kvitfjell	Norway	March 10, 2007	(Switzerland) Didier Cuche	(Canada) Erik Guay	(Liechtenstein) Marco Büchel
11	36	Lenzerheide	Switzerland	March 14, 2007	(Norway) Aksel Lund Svindal	(Switzerland) Daniel Albrecht	(Austria) Christoph Gruber

== Final point standings ==
In men's downhill World Cup 2006/07 all results count.

Place	Name	Country	Total points	3 (Canada)	6 (United States)	11 (Italy)	16 (Italy)	17 (Italy)	20 (Switzerland)	22 (France)	28 (Germany)	29 (Germany)	34 (Norway)	36 (Switzerland)
1	Didier Cuche	Switzerland	652	45	80	80	80	45	80	26	11	60	100	45
2	Marco Büchel	Liechtenstein	471	100	36	36	40	36	45	36	18	32	60	32
3	Erik Guay	Canada	393	8	-	10	26	16	13	80	60	100	80	-
4	Peter Fill	Italy	382	60	50	16	16	80	60	36	4	15	45	-
5	Michael Walchhofer	Austria	370	26	45	15	100	100	-	10	-	-	50	24
6	Andrej Jerman	Slovenia	339	-	22	29	50	29	16	13	100	80	-	-
7	Aksel Lund Svindal	Norway	321	-	18	40	18	40	32	22	15	12	24	100
8	Bode Miller	United States	318	2	100	18	-	50	100	-	3	-	16	29
9	Mario Scheiber	Austria	254	8	29	14	60	60	-	45	6	29	3	-
10	Steven Nyman	United States	250	14	60	100	-	10	24	-	22	4	-	16
11	Christoph Gruber	Austria	242	22	-	6	11	7	36	-	40	50	10	60
12	Manuel Osborne-Paradis	Canada	241	80	4	45	-	-	7	60	9	36	-	-
13	Pierre-Emmanuel Dalcin	France	227	-	11	11	15	6	26	100	45	13	-	-
14	Ambrosi Hoffmann	Switzerland	222	24	22	-	22	18	50	14	16	22	8	26
	Fritz Strobl	Austria	220	12	12	60	29	13	20	16	24	14	20	-
16	Bruno Kernen	Switzerland	214	29	-	24	32	26	18	29	10	10	36	-
17	Andreas Buder	Austria	198	-	-	26	36	13	10	40	32	5	-	36
18	Hermann Maier	Austria	189	40	8	32	8	3	29	15	2	6	1	45
19	Hans Grugger	Austria	182	50	3	-	-	15	-	22	80	8	4	-
20	Patrick Staudacher	Italy	177	-	24	3	45	32	11	18	26	18	-	-
21	Didier Défago	Switzerland	158	6	10	-	1	9	-	26	50	20	36	-
	Klaus Kröll	Austria	158	36	14	9	13	15	40	-	29	2	-	-
23	Kurt Sulzenbacher	Italy	151	16	40	22	-	24	12	8	13	16	-	-
24	Marco Sullivan	United States	134	5	26	50	20	22	-	11	-	-	-	-
25	Yannick Bertrand	France	121	-	14	5	3	8	8	50	7	26	-	-
26	Silvan Zurbriggen	Switzerland	104	-	-	13	14	-	6	-	5	24	18	24
27	Tobias Grünenfelder	Switzerland	101	11	15	-	9	11	-	3	12	40	-	-
28	Marc Bottollier-Lasquin	France	85	-	5	-	24	2	2	7	36	9	-	-
29	Scott Macartney	United States	83	3	32	8	-	-	-	12	20	8	-	-
30	Daniel Albrecht	Switzerland	80	-	-	-	-	-	-	-	-	-	-	80
31	Jan Hudec	Canada	67	14	-	-	-	-	-	-	8	45	-	-
32	Benjamin Raich	Austria	59	-	-	-	2	5	22	-	-	-	10	20
33	Werner Heel	Italy	57	22	-	-	-	-	-	2	-	4	29	-
	Johan Clarey	France	57	-	16	-	-	-	-	-	1	-	40	-
35	Ted Ligety	United States	50	-	-	-	-	-	-	-	-	-	-	50
	Patrik Järbyn	Sweden	50	15	-	-	-	1	15	5	14	-	-	-
37	Stephan Keppler	Germany	48	32	-	-	7	4	5	-	-	-	-	-
38	John Kucera	Canada	47	18	8	-	-	-	9	-	-	-	12	-
39	Georg Streitberger	Austria	45	9	-	12	6	-	-	4	-	-	14	-
40	Roland Fischnaller	Italy	37	-	1	2	12	22	-	-	-	-	-	-
41	Finlay Mickel	United Kingdom	35	-	-	20	-	-	3	6	-	-	6	-
42	Lars Elton Myhre	Norway	26	-	-	-	-	-	-	-	-	-	26	-
43	Jeffrey Frisch	Canada	22	-	-	-	-	-	-	-	-	-	22	-
	Johannes Stehle	Germany	22	-	-	-	4	-	-	-	-	11	7	-
45	Hans Olsson	Sweden	19	4	-	-	-	-	-	-	-	-	15	-
46	Beat Feuz	Switzerland	18	-	-	-	-	-	-	-	-	-	-	18
47	Walter Girardi	Italy	17	-	9	7	-	-	1	-	-	-	-	-
48	François Bourque	Canada	15	-	6	4	-	-	4	1	-	-	-	-
	Beni Hofer	Switzerland	15	-	-	-	-	-	14	-	-	1	-	-
50	Cyril Nocenti	France	13	-	-	-	-	-	-	-	-	-	13	-
51	Christof Innerhofer	Italy	11	-	-	-	6	-	-	-	-	-	5	-
	Michael Bonetti	Switzerland	11	-	-	-	11	-	-	-	-	-	-	-
	Rok Perko	Slovenia	11	-	-	-	-	-	-	-	-	-	11	-
54	Jürg Grünenfelder	Switzerland	10	10	-	-	-	-	-	-	-	-	-	-
55	Antoine Dénériaz	France	9	-	-	-	-	-	-	9	-	-	-	-
56	David Poisson	France	2	-	2	-	-	-	-	-	-	-	-	-
	Silvano Varettoni	Italy	2	-	-	-	-	-	-	-	-	-	2	-
58	Romed Baumann	Austria	1	1	-	-	-	-	-	-	-	-	-	-
	Norbert Holzknecht	Austria	1	-	-	1	-	-	-	-	-	-	-	-

Note:

In the last race only the best racers were allowed to compete and only the best 15 finishers were awarded with points.

== Men's downhill team results ==
Bold indicates highest score - Italics indicates race wins

Place	Country	Total points	3 (Canada)	6 (United States)	11 (Italy)	16 (Italy)	17 (Italy)	20 (Switzerland)	22 (France)	28 (Germany)	29 (Germany)	34 (Norway)	36 (Switzerland)	Racers	Wins
1	Austria	1919	204	111	175	**265**	231	157	152	213	114	112	185	12	2
2	Switzerland	1585	125	127	117	169	109	168	98	104	177	198	193	11	1
3	United States	835	24	218	176	20	82	124	23	45	12	16	95	5	3
4	Italy	834	98	124	50	79	158	84	64	43	53	81	-	8	0
5	Canada	785	120	18	59	26	16	33	141	77	181	114	-	6	1
6	France	514	-	48	16	42	16	36	166	89	48	53	-	7	1
7	Liechtenstein	471	100	36	36	40	36	45	36	18	32	60	32	1	1
8	Slovenia	350	-	22	29	50	29	16	13	100	80	11	-	2	1
9	Norway	347	-	18	40	18	40	32	22	15	12	50	100	2	1
10	Germany	70	32	-	-	11	4	5	-	-	11	7	-	2	0
11	Sweden	69	19	-	-	-	1	15	5	14	-	15	-	2	0
12	United Kingdom	35	-	-	20	-	-	3	6	-	-	6	-	1	0

**Alpine Skiing World Cup**
**Men**

Overall | **Downhill** | Super G | Giant slalom | Slalom | Combined

**2007**
