= 2005 Alpine Skiing World Cup – Men's combined =

2005 Men's Combined World Cup
Previous: 2004	Next: 2006

Men's combined World Cup 2004/2005

== Calendar ==
Round	Race No	Discipline	Place	Country	Date	Winner	Second	Third
1	20	Combined	Wengen	Switzerland	January 14, 2005	(Austria) Benjamin Raich	(Norway) Lasse Kjus	(Switzerland) Didier Défago

For the first time the combined was held as a separate event.

== Final point standings ==
In men's combined World Cup 2004/05 only one competition was held.

Place	Name	Country	Total points	20 (Switzerland)
1	Benjamin Raich	Austria	100	100
2	Lasse Kjus	Norway	80	80
3	Didier Défago	Switzerland	60	60
4	Daniel Albrecht	Switzerland	50	50
5	Kjetil André Aamodt	Norway	45	45
6	Pierrick Bourgeat	France	40	40
7	Christoph Gruber	Austria	36	36
8	Peter Fill	Italy	32	32
9	Markus Larsson	Sweden	29	29
	Hermann Maier	Austria	29	29
11	Andrej Jerman	Slovenia	24	24
12	John Kucera	Canada	22	22
13	Stefan Thanei	Italy	20	20
14	Ambrosi Hoffmann	Switzerland	18	18
15	Mario Scheiber	Austria	16	16
16	Scott Macartney	United States	15	15
17	Patrik Järbyn	Sweden	14	14
18	Alex Antor	Andorra	13	13
19	Erik Guay	Canada	12	12
20	Marco Büchel	Liechtenstein	11	11
21	Paul Accola	Switzerland	10	10

No more finishers in time.

== Men's combined team results ==
bold indicate highest score - italics indicate race wins

Place	Country	Total points	20 (Switzerland)	Racers	Wins
1	Austria	181	**181**	4	1
2	Switzerland	138	138	4	0
3	Norway	125	125	2	0
4	Italy	52	52	2	0
5	Sweden	43	43	2	0
6	France	40	40	1	0
7	Canada	34	34	2	0
8	Slovenia	24	24	1	0
9	United States	15	15	1	0
10	Andorra	13	13	1	0
11	Liechtenstein	11	11	1	0
