= FIS Alpine World Ski Championships 2017 – Men's super-G =

Men's super-G at the FIS Alpine World Ski Championships 2017
- Venue: Piz Nair
- Location: St. Moritz, Switzerland
- Dates: 8 February
- Competitors: 72 from 32 nations
- Winning time: 1:25.38

Medalists
gold medal	Erik Guay	Canada
silver medal	Kjetil Jansrud	Norway
bronze medal	Manuel Osborne-Paradis	Canada

The Men's super-G competition at the 2017 World Championships was held on 8 February 2017.

== Results ==
The race was started at 12:00.

Rank	Bib	Name	Country	Time	Diff
1st place, gold medalist(s)	14	Erik Guay	Canada	1:25.38	
2nd place, silver medalist(s)	9	Kjetil Jansrud	Norway	1:25.83	+0.45
3rd place, bronze medalist(s)	26	Manuel Osborne-Paradis	Canada	1:25.89	+0.51
4	13	Aleksander Aamodt Kilde	Norway	1:25.92	+0.54
5	1	Vincent Kriechmayr	Austria	1:26.26	+0.88
6	8	Alexis Pinturault	France	1:26.28	+0.90
7	6	Andreas Sander	Germany	1:26.35	+0.97
8	19	Carlo Janka	Switzerland	1:26.37	+0.99
9	7	Dominik Paris	Italy	1:26.40	+1.02
10	17	Hannes Reichelt	Austria	1:26.47	+1.09
11	3	Peter Fill	Italy	1:26.49	+1.11
12	5	Beat Feuz	Switzerland	1:26.51	+1.13
13	11	Max Franz	Austria	1:26.75	+1.37
14	28	Blaise Giezendanner	France	1:26.96	+1.58
14	4	Travis Ganong	United States	1:26.96	+1.58
16	2	Adrien Théaux	France	1:26.99	+1.61
17	34	Martin Čater	Slovenia	1:27.19	+1.81
18	25	Brice Roger	France	1:27.22	+1.84
19	23	Mattia Casse	Italy	1:27.29	+1.91
20	24	Mauro Caviezel	Switzerland	1:27.30	+1.92
21	20	Marcel Hirscher	Austria	1:27.43	+2.05
22	22	Patrick Küng	Switzerland	1:27.44	+2.06
23	31	Emanuele Buzzi	Italy	1:27.54	+2.16
24	38	Miha Hrobat	Slovenia	1:27.76	+2.38
25	33	Bjørnar Neteland	Norway	1:28.18	+2.80
26	16	Josef Ferstl	Germany	1:28.22	+2.84
27	45	Christoffer Faarup	Denmark	1:28.24	+2.86
28	43	Ryan Cochran-Siegle	United States	1:28.76	+3.38
29	46	Henrik von Appen	Chile	1:28.87	+3.49
30	36	Alexander Köll	Sweden	1:28.94	+3.56
31	53	Filip Zubčić	Croatia	1:29.05	+3.67
32	21	Jan Hudec	Czech Republic	1:29.31	+3.93
33	37	Marc Oliveras	Andorra	1:29.35	+3.97
34	39	Willis Feasey	New Zealand	1:29.60	+4.22
35	41	Pavel Trikhichev	Russia	1:29.78	+4.40
36	55	Marco Pfiffner	Liechtenstein	1:29.81	+4.43
37	52	Maciej Bydliński	Poland	1:29.83	+4.45
38	54	Michał Kłusak	Poland	1:30.19	+4.81
39	49	Ondřej Berndt	Czech Republic	1:30.40	+5.02
40	58	Jan Zabystřan	Czech Republic	1:30.64	+5.26
41	64	Yuri Danilochkin	Belarus	1:30.94	+5.56
42	65	Ioan Valeriu Achiriloaie	Romania	1:31.59	+6.21
43	61	Kai Horwitz	Chile	1:32.11	+6.73
44	44	Adam Barwood	New Zealand	1:32.82	+7.44
45	63	Marko Stevović	Serbia	1:32.93	+7.55
46	70	Simon Breitfuss Kammerlander	Bolivia	1:33.27	+7.89
47	60	Igor Zakurdayev	Kazakhstan	1:34.68	+9.30
48	66	Ivan Kovbasnyuk	Ukraine	1:34.77	+9.39
49	71	Albin Tahiri	Kosovo	1:36.29	+10.91
50	72	Taras Pimenov	Kazakhstan	1:43.88	+18.50
51	69	Nikita Shcherbakovskiy	Israel	1:48.70	+23.32
—	10	Boštjan Kline	Slovenia	DNF	
—	12	Dustin Cook	Canada	DNF	
—	15	Matthias Mayer	Austria	DNF	
—	18	Andrew Weibrecht	United States	DNF	
—	27	Thomas Biesemeyer	United States	DNF	
—	29	Thomas Dressen	Germany	DNF	
—	30	Klemen Kosi	Slovenia	DNF	
—	32	Joan Verdú	Andorra	DNF	
—	35	Felix Monsén	Sweden	DNF	
—	40	Ivan Kuznetsov	Russia	DNF	
—	42	Marko Vukičević	Serbia	DNF	
—	47	Olivier Jenot	Monaco	DNF	
—	48	Kryštof Krýzl	Czech Republic	DNF	
—	50	Adam Žampa	Slovakia	DNF	
—	51	Max Ullrich	Croatia	DNF	
—	56	Harry Laidlaw	Australia	DNF	
—	57	Andreas Žampa	Slovakia	DNF	
—	59	Sven von Appen	Chile	DNF	
—	62	Martin Bendík	Slovakia	DNF	
—	67	Juhan Luik	Estonia	DNF	
—	68	Márton Kékesi	Hungary	DNF	
