= FIS Alpine World Ski Championships 2017 – Men's downhill =

Men's downhill at the FIS Alpine World Ski Championships 2017
- Venue: Corviglia, Piz Nair
- Location: St. Moritz, Switzerland
- Dates: 12 February
- Competitors: 56 from 24 nations
- Winning time: 1:38.91

Medalists
gold medal	Beat Feuz	Switzerland
silver medal	Erik Guay	Canada
bronze medal	Max Franz	Austria

Men's Downhill
- Location: Corviglia; St. Moritz, Switzerland
- Vertical: 705 m (2,313 ft)
- Top elevation: 2,745 m (9,006 ft)
- Base elevation: 2,040 m (6,693 ft)
- Longest run: 2.920 km (1.81 mi)

The Men's downhill competition at the 2017 World Championships was scheduled for Saturday, 11 February. Postponed due to fog, it was run from a lower start on Sunday, 12 February.

Switzerland's Beat Feuz won the gold medal, Erik Guay of Canada took the silver, and the bronze medalist was Max Franz of Austria.

The race course was 2.920 km (1.814 mi) in length, with a vertical drop of 705 m (2,313 ft) from a starting elevation of 2,745 m (9,006 ft) above sea level. Feuz's winning time of 98.91 seconds yielded an average speed of 106.278 km/h (66.0 mph) and an average vertical descent rate of 7.1277 m/s (23.4 ft/s).

== Results ==
The race started at 13:30 CET (UTC+1). Its start was lowered 95 m (312 ft), shortening the length by 0.130 km (0.081 mi) to 2.920 km (1.814 mi).

Rank	Bib	Name	Country	Time	Diff
1st place, gold medalist(s)	13	Beat Feuz	Switzerland	1:38.91	—
2nd place, silver medalist(s)	17	Erik Guay	Canada	1:39.03	+0.12
3rd place, bronze medalist(s)	18	Max Franz	Austria	1:39.28	+0.37
4	10	Patrick Küng	Switzerland	1:39.30	+0.39
4	9	Kjetil Jansrud	Norway	1:39.30	+0.39
6	20	Aleksander Aamodt Kilde	Norway	1:39.40	+0.49
7	8	Boštjan Kline	Slovenia	1:39.43	+0.52
8	16	Andreas Sander	Germany	1:39.47	+0.56
9	7	Peter Fill	Italy	1:39.56	+0.65
10	21	Brice Roger	France	1:39.73	+0.82
11	19	Matthias Mayer	Austria	1:39.77	+0.86
12	24	Thomas Dressen	Germany	1:39.79	+0.88
13	5	Dominik Paris	Italy	1:39.80	+0.89
14	34	Miha Hrobat	Slovenia	1:39.97	+1.06
14	4	Guillermo Fayed	France	1:39.97	+1.06
16	38	Felix Monsén	Sweden	1:39.98	+1.07
17	15	Hannes Reichelt	Austria	1:39.99	+1.08
18	28	Josef Ferstl	Germany	1:40.04	+1.13
19	6	Vincent Kriechmayr	Austria	1:40.06	+1.15
20	25	Jared Goldberg	United States	1:40.10	+1.19
21	29	Mauro Caviezel	Switzerland	1:40.14	+1.23
22	26	Mattia Casse	Italy	1:40.21	+1.30
23	23	Nils Mani	Switzerland	1:40.26	+1.35
24	22	Klemen Kosi	Slovenia	1:40.46	+1.55
25	11	Travis Ganong	United States	1:40.50	+1.59
26	12	Bryce Bennett	United States	1:40.53	+1.62
27	3	Adrien Théaux	France	1:40.63	+1.72
28	1	Carlo Janka	Switzerland	1:40.64	+1.73
29	27	Thomas Biesemeyer	United States	1:40.65	+1.74
30	43	Christoffer Faarup	Denmark	1:40.82	+1.91
31	2	Manuel Osborne-Paradis	Canada	1:40.84	+1.93
32	39	Henrik von Appen	Chile	1:41.09	+2.18
33	46	Joan Verdu	Andorra	1:41.54	+2.63
34	40	Ivan Kuznetsov	Russia	1:41.79	+2.88
35	35	Alexander Köll	Sweden	1:41.83	+2.92
36	36	Marc Oliveras	Andorra	1:41.87	+2.96
37	44	Maciej Bydliński	Poland	1:42.03	+3.12
38	30	Rok Perko	Slovenia	1:42.06	+3.15
39	32	Jan Hudec	Czech Republic	1:42.09	+3.18
40	31	Marko Vukićević	Serbia	1:42.64	+3.73
41	33	Martin Bendík	Slovakia	1:42.66	+3.75
42	47	Marco Pfiffner	Liechtenstein	1:42.85	+3.94
43	41	Ondřej Berndt	Czech Republic	1:43.09	+4.18
44	45	Jan Zabystřan	Czech Republic	1:43.27	+4.36
45	48	Cristian Javier Simari Birkner	Argentina	1:43.95	+5.04
46	56	Ioan Valeriu Achiriloaie	Romania	1:44.73	+5.82
47	37	Filip Forejtek	Czech Republic	1:44.97	+6.06
48	50	Marko Stevović	Serbia	1:44.98	+6.07
49	51	Igor Zakudayev	Kazakhstan	1:45.07	+6.16
50	49	Sven von Appen	Chile	1:45.60	+6.69
51	55	Albin Tahiri	Kosovo	1:46.86	+7.95
52	53	Márton Kékesi	Hungary	1:47.76	+8.85
53	54	Kai Horwitz	Chile	1:48.29	+9.38
	14	Johan Clarey	France	DNF	
	42	Michał Kłusak	Poland	DNF	
	52	Bence Nagy	Hungary	DNF	
