= 2006–07 FIS Alpine Ski World Cup =

International sports competition

FIS Alpine Ski World Cup 2006/07
Discipline	Men	Women
Overall	(Norway) Aksel Lund Svindal	(Austria) Nicole Hosp
Downhill	(Switzerland) Didier Cuche	(Austria) Renate Götschl
Super-G	(United States) Bode Miller	(Austria) Renate Götschl
Giant slalom	(Norway) Aksel Lund Svindal	(Austria) Nicole Hosp
Slalom	(Austria) Benjamin Raich	(Austria) Marlies Schild
Super combined	(Norway) Aksel Lund Svindal	(Austria) Marlies Schild
Nations Cup	Austria	Austria
- Nations Cup Overall: Austria

Competition
Locations	17	15
Individual	36	35
Mixed	1	1
Cancelled	2	1
Rescheduled	9	10

2007 World Cup Champions

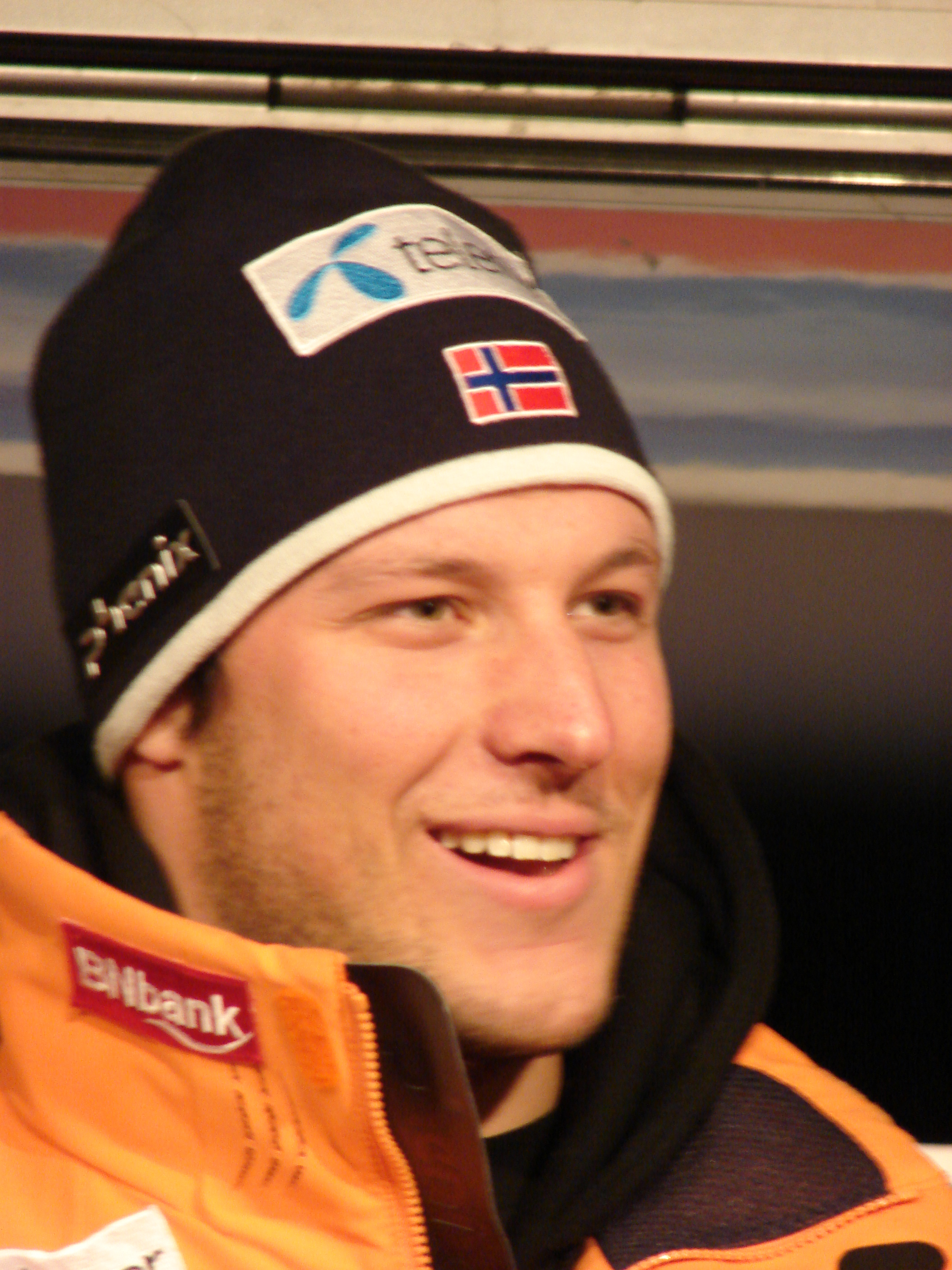
Aksel Lund Svindal

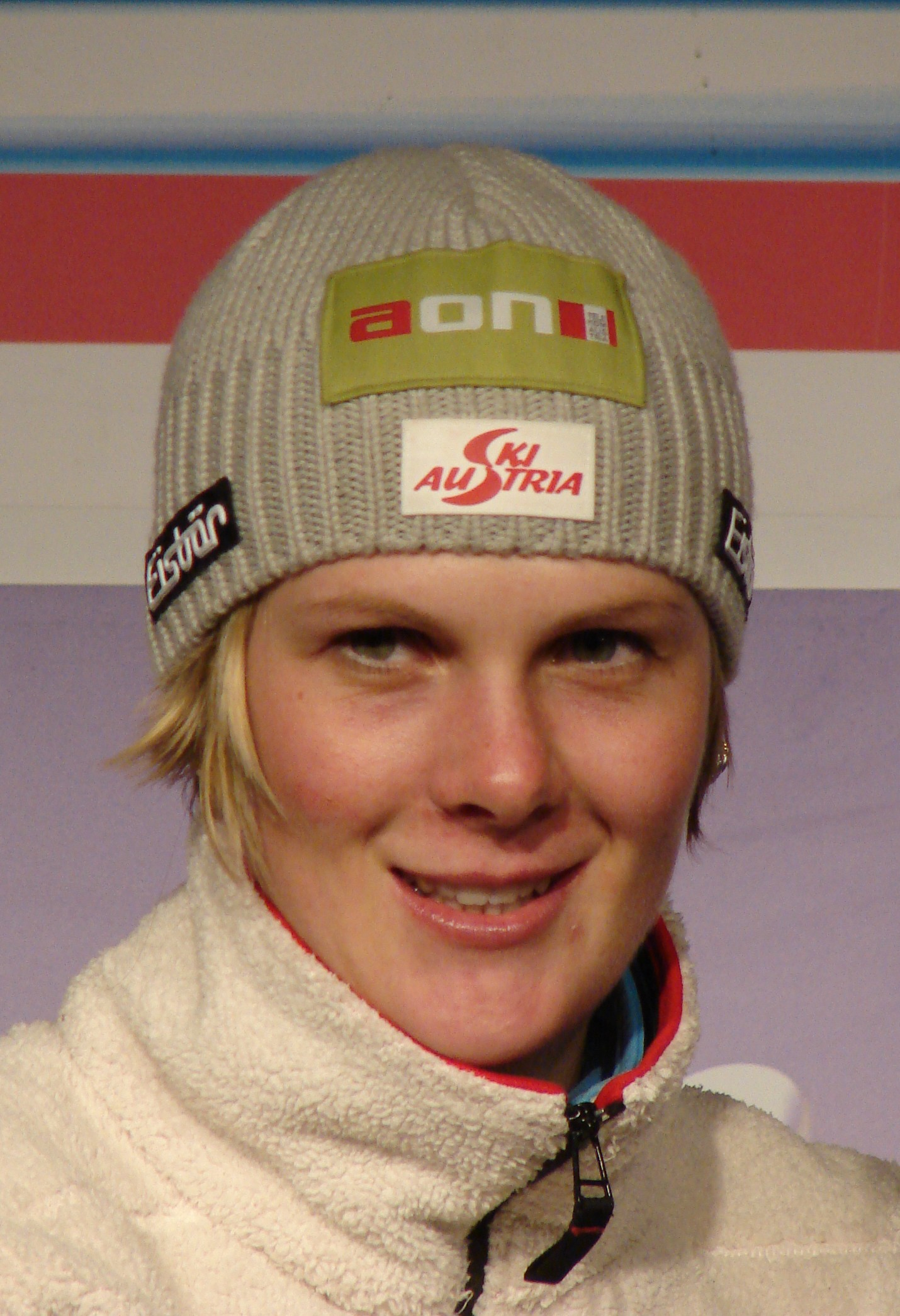
Nicole Hosp

The 41st World Cup season was scheduled to begin on 28 October 2006, but cancellation of the opening races in Sölden delayed the season's start by two weeks. A very poor snowpack in the Alps, along with stormy weather in January, caused numerous races to be moved and rescheduled throughout the winter. The schedule included a mid-season break during the first 3 weeks of February for the World Championships in Åre, Sweden. The season concluded on 18 March 2007, at the World Cup Finals in Lenzerheide, Switzerland.

== Summary ==
The top two finishers from last season, Benjamin Raich of Austria and Aksel Lund Svindal of Norway, at the top of the standings for most of the season. With consistent podium performances in the speed races, which won him the Cup title in downhill, Didier Cuche of Switzerland finished a solid third overall. The 2005 overall champion and last year's third-place finisher, American Bode Miller, won four speed events but struggled in the technical events, keeping him from the top spots in the overall standings throughout the season. Before the final four individual races of the season, these four athletes still had a mathematical chance to win the overall World Cup title. The strongest newcomer was Jens Byggmark of Sweden, who won the first two races of his career on consecutive days in late January to vault temporarily into the top ranks in the slalom standings. Also in slalom, Mario Matt of Austria came back to win three races in 2007, regaining his top form from the 2000 and 2001 seasons. Matt ultimately lost the slalom title to Raich by just 5 points.

The early season on the women's side was led by Marlies Schild of Austria, who won six slaloms and a super combined, clinching both of these Cups early. But the biggest story of the season's first half was the resurgence of Austria's Renate Götschl, who was coming off a difficult 2006 season which saw her drop to 19th in the overall standings, her worst finish since 1994. She rebounded to dominate the speed events, winning four races in Super-G and three in downhill, securing the trophies in both of these events. American Julia Mancuso, 2006 Olympic gold medalist, had a very strong season, scoring the first four World Cup wins of her career. Nicole Hosp of Austria had a solid season with several podium positions, but few victories. Lindsey Kildow of the US celebrated three victories before she had to drop out after the World Championships due to a knee injury. Entering the World Cup Finals, four women – Hosp, Götschl, Mancuso, and Schild – were within a 102-point range, and each of them had a realistic chance of winning the overall World Cup title.

At the World Cup Finals in Lenzerheide, Switzerland, both the men's and women's overall titles came down to the technical events.

On the men's side, the race came down to Raich and Svindal. Going into the technical events, Raich looked unbeatable but a DNF for him in GS meant that Svindal would have an opportunity to clinch the title on the final day in slalom, his weakest event. Svindal needed only to finish in the top fifteen and score points in order to win the title, and he achieved it in hair-raising fashion – by finishing 15th.

Marlies Schild seemed a sure bet for the women's overall title after uncharacteristically strong performances in the speed events. But she skied disastrously in the slalom, the event that she had dominated all season long, and failed to score any points. That meant she needed both a strong performance in the GS and a weak one from her lone remaining rival, Nicole Hosp. But Hosp won the race while Schild managed just sixth place, ensuring the Cup title (and the GS globe) for Hosp.

== Calendar ==
=== Men ===
Event key: DH – Downhill, SL – Slalom, GS – Giant slalom, SG – Super giant slalom, KB – Classic Combined, SC – Super combined
Race	Season	Date	Place	Type	Winner	Second	Third
		29 October 2006	(Austria) Sölden	GS _{cnx}	canceled		
1262	1	12 November 2006	(Finland) Levi	SL _{361}	(Austria) Benjamin Raich	(Sweden) Markus Larsson	(Italy) Giorgio Rocca
1263	2	25 November 2006	(Canada) Lake Louise	DH _{368}	(Liechtenstein) Marco Büchel	(Canada) Manuel Osborne-Paradis	(Italy) Peter Fill
1264	3	26 November 2006	(Canada) Lake Louise	SG _{130}	(Canada) John Kucera	(Austria) Mario Scheiber	(Sweden) Patrik Järbyn
1265	4	30 November 2006	(United States) Beaver Creek	SC _{092}	(Norway) Aksel Lund Svindal	(Switzerland) Marc Berthod	(Austria) Rainer Schönfelder
1266	5	1 December 2006	(United States) Beaver Creek	DH _{369}	(United States) Bode Miller	(Switzerland) Didier Cuche	(United States) Steven Nyman
1267	6	2 December 2006	(United States) Beaver Creek	GS _{312}	(Italy) Massimiliano Blardone	(Norway) Aksel Lund Svindal	(United States) Ted Ligety
1268	7	3 December 2006	(United States) Beaver Creek	SL _{362}	(Sweden) André Myhrer	(Canada) Michael Janyk	(Germany) Felix Neureuther
		9 December 2006	(France) Val d'Isère	DH _{cnx}	replaced in Bormio on 28 December 2006		
		10 December 2006	(France) Val d'Isère	SC _{cnx}	replaced in Reiteralm on 10 December 2006		
1269	8	(Note: Super combined from Val d'Isère was rescheduled to Reiteralm on 10 December 2006)10 December 2006	(Austria) Reiteralm	SC _{093}	(Croatia) Ivica Kostelić	(Austria) Romed Baumann	(France) Pierrick Bourgeat
1270	9	15 December 2006	(Italy) Val Gardena	SG _{131}	(United States) Bode Miller	(Austria) Christoph Gruber	(Canada) John Kucera
1271	10	16 December 2006	(Italy) Val Gardena	DH _{370}	(United States) Steven Nyman	(Switzerland) Didier Cuche	(Austria) Fritz Strobl
1272	11	17 December 2006	(Italy) Alta Badia	GS _{313}	(Finland) Kalle Palander	(United States) Bode Miller	(Switzerland) Didier Défago
1273	12	18 December 2006	(Italy) Alta Badia	SL _{363}	(Sweden) Markus Larsson	(United States) Ted Ligety	(Croatia) Ivica Kostelić
1274	13	20 December 2006	(Austria) Hinterstoder	SG _{132}	(United States) Bode Miller	(Italy) Peter Fill	(Austria) Hermann Maier
1275	14	21 December 2006	(Austria) Hinterstoder	GS _{314}	(Norway) Aksel Lund Svindal	(Canada) François Bourque	(Finland) Kalle Palander
1276	15	(Note: Downhill from Val d'Isère was rescheduled to Bormio on 28 December 2006)28 December 2006	(Italy) Bormio	DH _{371}	(Austria) Michael Walchhofer	(Switzerland) Didier Cuche	(Austria) Mario Scheiber
1277	16	29 December 2006	(Italy) Bormio	DH _{372}	(Austria) Michael Walchhofer	(Italy) Peter Fill	(Austria) Mario Scheiber
1278	17	6 January 2007	(Switzerland) Adelboden	GS _{315}	(Austria) Benjamin Raich	(Italy) Massimiliano Blardone	(Norway) Aksel Lund Svindal
1279	18	7 January 2007	(Switzerland) Adelboden	SL _{364}	(Switzerland) Marc Berthod	(Austria) Benjamin Raich	(Austria) Mario Matt
		12 January 2007	(Switzerland) Wengen	SC _{cnx}	replaced in Wengen on 14 January 2007		
1280	19	13 January 2007	(Switzerland) Wengen	DH _{373}	(United States) Bode Miller	(Switzerland) Didier Cuche	(Italy) Peter Fill
1281	20	(Note: Super combined from Wengen was rescheduled from 12 to 14 January 2007)14 January 2007	(Switzerland) Wengen	SC _{094}	(Austria) Mario Matt	(Switzerland) Marc Berthod	(Switzerland) Silvan Zurbriggen
		14 January 2007	(Switzerland) Wengen	SL _{cnx}	replaced in Kitzbühel on 27 January 2007		
		20 January 2007	(France) Chamonix	DH _{cnx}	replaced in Val d'Isère on 20 January 2007		
1282	21	(Note: Downhill from Chamonix was rescheduled to Val d'Isère on 20 January 2007)20 January 2007	(France) Val d'Isère	DH _{374}	(France) Pierre-Emmanuel Dalcin	(Canada) Erik Guay	(Canada) Manuel Osborne-Paradis
		21 January 2007	(France) Chamonix	SC _{cnx}	replaced in Val d'Isère on 21 January 2007		
		21 January 2007	(France) Val d'Isère	SC _{cnx}	replaced in Kvitfjell on 9 March 2007		
		26 January 2007	(Austria) Kitzbühel	SG _{cnx}	canceled		
		27 January 2007	(Austria) Kitzbühel	DH _{cnx}	replaced in Garmisch-Partenkirchen on 23 February 2007		
1283	22	(Note: Slalom from Wengen was rescheduled to Kitzbühel on 27 January 2007)27 January 2007	(Austria) Kitzbühel	SL _{365}	(Sweden) Jens Byggmark	(Austria) Mario Matt	(Germany) Alois Vogl
1284	23	28 January 2007	(Austria) Kitzbühel	SL _{366}	(Sweden) Jens Byggmark	(Austria) Mario Matt	(Italy) Manfred Mölgg
		29 January 2007	(Austria) Kitzbühel	KB _{cnx}	canceled		
1285	24	30 January 2007	(Austria) Schladming	SL _{367}	(Austria) Benjamin Raich	(Sweden) Jens Byggmark	(Austria) Mario Matt
2007 World Championships (2–18 February)
1286	25	(Note: Downhill from Kitzbühel was rescheduled to Garmisch-Partenkirchen on 23 February 2007)23 February 2007	(Germany) Garmisch-Partenkirchen	DH _{375}	(Slovenia) Andrej Jerman	(Austria) Hans Grugger	(Canada) Erik Guay
1287	26	24 February 2007	(Germany) Garmisch-Partenkirchen	DH _{376}	(Canada) Erik Guay	(Slovenia) Andrej Jerman	(Switzerland) Didier Cuche
1288	27	25 February 2007	(Germany) Garmisch-Partenkirchen	SL _{368}	(Austria) Mario Matt	(Germany) Felix Neureuther	(Austria) Benjamin Raich
1289	28	3 March 2007	(Slovenia) Kranjska Gora	GS _{316}	(Austria) Benjamin Raich	(Canada) François Bourque	(Italy) Massimiliano Blardone
1290	29	4 March 2007	(Slovenia) Kranjska Gora	SL _{369}	(Austria) Mario Matt	(Austria) Benjamin Raich	(Italy) Manfred Mölgg
1291	30	(Note: Super combined from Chamonix first moved to Val d'Isère and canceled was rescheduled to Kvitfjell on 9 March 2007)9 March 2007	(Norway) Kvitfjell	SC _{095}	(Austria) Benjamin Raich	(Switzerland) Silvan Zurbriggen	(Norway) Aksel Lund Svindal
		9 March 2007	(Norway) Kvitfjell	DH _{cnx}	replaced in Kvitfjell on 10 March 2007		
1292	31	(Note: Downhill from Kvitfjell was rescheduled from 9 to 10 March 2007)10 March 2007	(Norway) Kvitfjell	DH _{377}	(Switzerland) Didier Cuche	(Canada) Erik Guay	(Liechtenstein) Marco Büchel
		10 March 2007	(Norway) Kvitfjell	SG _{cnx}	replaced in Kvitfjell on 11 March 2007		
1293	32	(Note: Super G from Kvitfjell was rescheduled from 10 to 11 March 2007)11 March 2007	(Norway) Kvitfjell	SG _{133}	(Austria) Hans Grugger	(Austria) Mario Scheiber	(Switzerland) Didier Cuche
1294	33	14 March 2007	(Switzerland) Lenzerheide	DH _{378}	(Norway) Aksel Lund Svindal	(Switzerland) Daniel Albrecht	(Austria) Christoph Gruber
1295	34	15 March 2007	(Switzerland) Lenzerheide	SG _{134}	(Norway) Aksel Lund Svindal	(Austria) Benjamin Raich	(Canada) Erik Guay
1296	35	17 March 2007	(Switzerland) Lenzerheide	GS _{317}	(Norway) Aksel Lund Svindal	(Italy) Massimiliano Blardone	(United States) Bode Miller
1297	36	18 March 2007	(Switzerland) Lenzerheide	SL _{370}	(Austria) Benjamin Raich	(Austria) Mario Matt	(Italy) Manfred Mölgg

=== Ladies ===
Event key: DH – Downhill, SL – Slalom, GS – Giant slalom, SG – Super giant slalom, SC – Super combined
Race	Season	Date	Place	Type	Winner	Second	Third
		28 October 2006	(Austria) Sölden	GS _{cnx}	cancelled		
1182	1	11 November 2006	(Finland) Levi	SL _{347}	(Austria) Marlies Schild	(Austria) Nicole Hosp	(Austria) Kathrin Zettel
1183	2	25 November 2006	(United States) Aspen	GS _{311}	(Austria) Kathrin Zettel	(Finland) Tanja Poutiainen	(Austria) Michaela Kirchgasser
1184	3	26 November 2006	(United States) Aspen	SL _{348}	(Austria) Marlies Schild	(Austria) Nicole Hosp	(Sweden) Therese Borssén
1185	4	1 December 2006	(Canada) Lake Louise	DH _{304}	(Germany) Maria Riesch	(United States) Lindsey Kildow	(Italy) Nadia Fanchini
1186	5	2 December 2006	(Canada) Lake Louise	DH _{305}	(United States) Lindsey Kildow	(Austria) Renate Götschl	(Sweden) Anja Pärson
1187	6	3 December 2006	(Canada) Lake Louise	SG _{144}	(Austria) Renate Götschl	(United States) Lindsey Kildow	(Canada) Kelly VanderBeek
		9 December 2006	(Switzerland) St. Moritz	DH _{cnx}	replaced in Val d'Isère on 20 December 2006		
		10 December 2006	(Switzerland) St. Moritz	SC _{cnx}	replaced in Reiteralm on 15 December 2006		
1188	7	(Note: Super combined from St. Moritz was rescheduled to Reiteralm on 15 December 2006)15 December 2006	(Austria) Reiteralm	SC _{076}	(Austria) Marlies Schild	(Austria) Michaela Kirchgasser	(Austria) Kathrin Zettel
1189	8	(Note: Super giant slalom from Val d'Isère was rescheduled to Reiteralm on 16 December 2006)16 December 2006	(Austria) Reiteralm	SG _{145}	(Austria) Renate Götschl	(Austria) Nicole Hosp	(Switzerland) Martina Schild
		16 December 2006	(France) Val d'Isère	DH _{cnx}	replaced in Val d'Isère on 19 December 2006		
		17 December 2006	(France) Val d'Isère	SG _{cnx}	replaced in Reiteralm on 16 December 2006		
1190	9	(Note: Downhill from Val d'Isère was rescheduled from 15 to 19 December 2006)19 December 2006	(France) Val d'Isère	DH _{306}	(United States) Julia Mancuso	(Austria) Renate Götschl	(United States) Lindsey Kildow
		19 December 2006	(France) Megève	SL _{cnx}	replaced in Val d'Isère on 21 December 2006		
1191	10	(Note: Downhill from St. Moritz was rescheduled to Val d'Isère on 20 December 2006)20 December 2006	(France) Val d'Isère	DH _{307}	(United States) Lindsey Kildow	(United States) Julia Mancuso	(Sweden) Anja Pärson
1192	11	(Note: Slalom from Megève was rescheduled to Val d'Isère on 21 December 2006)21 December 2006	(France) Val d'Isère	SL _{349}	(Austria) Marlies Schild	(Germany) Annemarie Gerg	(Sweden) Therese Borssén
1193	12	28 December 2006	(Austria) Semmering	GS _{312}	(Austria) Kathrin Zettel	(Austria) Nicole Hosp	(Austria) Marlies Schild
1194	13	29 December 2006	(Austria) Semmering	SL _{350}	(Sweden) Therese Borssén	(Austria) Kathrin Zettel	(Austria) Marlies Schild
1195	14	4 January 2007	(Croatia) Zagreb	SL _{351}	(Austria) Marlies Schild	(Croatia) Ana Jelušić	(Czech Republic) Šárka Záhrobská
		6 January 2006	(Slovenia) Maribor	GS _{cnx}	replaced in Kranjska Gora on 6 January 2007		
		7 January 2006	(Slovenia) Maribor	SL _{cnx}	replaced in Kranjska Gora on 7 January 2007		
1196	15	(Note: Giant slalom from Maribor was rescheduled to Kranjska Gora on 6 January 2007)6 January 2007	(Slovenia) Kranjska Gora	GS _{313}	(Austria) Nicole Hosp	(Italy) Nicole Gius	(Finland) Tanja Poutiainen
1197	16	(Note: Slalom from Maribor was rescheduled to Kranjska Gora on 7 January 2007)7 January 2007	(Slovenia) Kranjska Gora	SL _{352}	(Austria) Marlies Schild	(Czech Republic) Šárka Záhrobská	(Slovakia) Veronika Zuzulová
		12 January 2007	(Austria) Altenmarkt-Zauchensee	DH _{cnx}	replaced in Altenmarkt-Zauchensee on 13 January 2007		
		13 January 2007	(Austria) Altenmarkt-Zauchensee	SC _{cnx}	replaced in Altenmarkt-Zauchensee on 14 January 2007		
1198	17	(Note: Downhill from Altenmarkt-Zauchensee was rescheduled from 12 to 13 January 2007)13 January 2007	(Austria) Altenmarkt-Zauchensee	DH _{308}	(Austria) Renate Götschl	(Switzerland) Dominique Gisin	(United States) Julia Mancuso
1199	18	(Note: Super combined from Altenmarkt-Zauchensee was rescheduled from 13 to 14 January 2007)14 January 2007	(Austria) Altenmarkt-Zauchensee	SC _{077}	(United States) Julia Mancuso	(United States) Lindsey Kildow	(Austria) Marlies Schild
		14 January 2007	(Austria) Altenmarkt-Zauchensee	SG _{cnx}	replaced in San Sicario on 26 January 2007		
1200	19	19 January 2007	(Italy) Cortina d'Ampezzo	SG _{146}	(United States) Julia Mancuso	(Austria) Nicole Hosp	(Austria) Renate Götschl
1201	20	20 January 2007	(Italy) Cortina d'Ampezzo	DH _{309}	(Austria) Renate Götschl	(United States) Julia Mancuso	(France) Marie Marchand-Arvier
1202	21	21 January 2007	(Italy) Cortina d'Ampezzo	GS _{314}	(Italy) Karen Putzer	(United States) Julia Mancuso	(Italy) Denise Karbon
1203	22	(Note: Downhill from Altenmarkt-Zauchensee was rescheduled to San Sicario on 26 January 2007)26 January 2007	(Italy) San Sicario	SG _{147}	(Austria) Renate Götschl	(United States) Lindsey Kildow	(Austria) Christine Sponring
1204	23	27 January 2007	(Italy) San Sicario	DH _{310}	(Austria) Renate Götschl	(Austria) Elisabeth Görgl	(Austria) Maria Holaus
1205	24	28 January 2007	(Italy) San Sicario	SG _{146}	(United States) Lindsey Kildow	(Austria) Renate Götschl	(Austria) Christine Sponring
2007 World Championships (2–18 February)
1206	25	24 February 2007	(Spain) Sierra Nevada	GS _{315}	(Austria) Michaela Kirchgasser	(Austria) Nicole Hosp	(Finland) Tanja Poutiainen
1207	26	25 February 2007	(Spain) Sierra Nevada	SL _{353}	(Austria) Marlies Schild	(Finland) Tanja Poutiainen	(Slovakia) Veronika Zuzulová
1208	27	2 March 2007	(Italy) Tarvisio	SC _{078}	(Austria) Nicole Hosp	(United States) Julia Mancuso	(Austria) Marlies Schild
1209	28	3 March 2007	(Italy) Tarvisio	DH _{311}	(United States) Julia Mancuso	(Austria) Renate Götschl	(Canada) Emily Brydon
1210	29	4 March 2007	(Italy) Tarvisio	SG _{149}	(Austria) Renate Götschl	(Austria) Nicole Hosp	(United States) Julia Mancuso
1211	30	10 March 2007	(Germany) Zwiesel	GS _{316}	(Finland) Tanja Poutiainen	(Austria) Nicole Hosp	(Austria) Michaela Kirchgasser
1212	31	11 March 2007	(Germany) Zwiesel	SL _{354}	(Austria) Marlies Schild	(Sweden) Anna Ottosson (Czech Republic) Šárka Záhrobská	
1213	32	14 March 2007	(Switzerland) Lenzerheide	DH _{312}	(Austria) Renate Götschl	(Austria) Marlies Schild	(France) Marie Marchand-Arvier
1214	33	15 March 2007	(Switzerland) Lenzerheide	SG _{150}	(Sweden) Anja Pärson	(Austria) Andrea Fischbacher	(Austria) Marlies Schild
1215	34	17 March 2007	(Switzerland) Lenzerheide	SL _{355}	(Austria) Nicole Hosp	(Sweden) Anja Pärson	(Slovakia) Veronika Zuzulová
1216	35	18 March 2007	(Switzerland) Lenzerheide	GS _{317}	(Austria) Nicole Hosp	(Germany) Kathrin Hölzl	(Austria) Michaela Kirchgasser

=== Nations team event ===
Event key: SC – Super combined (super-G + slalom)
Race	Season	Date	Place	Type	Winner	Second	Third
2	2	16 March 2007	Lenzerheide	SC _{002}	Austria Andrea Fischbacher; Michaela Kirchgasser; Christoph Gruber; Reinfried Herbst; Manfred Pranger; Mario Scheiber	Italy Chiara Costazza; Daniela Merighetti; Massimiliano Blardone; Christian Deville; Peter Fill; Manfred Mölgg	France Florine de Leymarie; Ingrid Jacquemod; Marie Marchand-Arvier; Yannick Bertrand; Jean-Baptiste Grange; Julien Lizeroux

== Men's standings ==
=== Overall ===
see complete table

Rank	after all 36 races	Points
1	(Norway) Aksel Lund Svindal	1268
2	(Austria) Benjamin Raich	1255
3	(Switzerland) Didier Cuche	1098
4	(United States) Bode Miller	882
5	(Austria) Mario Matt	744

=== Downhill ===
see complete table

Rank	after all 11 races	Points
1	(Switzerland) Didier Cuche	652
2	(Liechtenstein) Marco Büchel	471
3	(Canada) Erik Guay	393
4	(Italy) Peter Fill	382
5	(Austria) Michael Walchhofer	370

=== Slalom ===
see complete table

Rank	after all 10 races	Points
1	(Austria) Benjamin Raich	605
2	(Austria) Mario Matt	600
3	(Sweden) Jens Byggmark	490
4	(Sweden) Markus Larsson	340
5	(Italy) Manfred Mölgg	334

=== Giant slalom ===
see complete table

Rank	after all 6 races	Points
1	(Norway) Aksel Lund Svindal	416
2	(Italy) Massimiliano Blardone	380
3	(Austria) Benjamin Raich	319
4	(Finland) Kalle Palander	299
5	(Canada) François Bourque	249

=== Super G ===
see complete table

Rank	after all 5 races	Points
1	(United States) Bode Miller	304
2	(Switzerland) Didier Cuche	208
3	(Canada) John Kucera	194
4	(Austria) Mario Scheiber	190
5	(Norway) Aksel Lund Svindal	181

=== Super combined ===
see complete table

Rank	after all 4 races	Points
1	(Norway) Aksel Lund Svindal	232
2	(Switzerland) Marc Berthod	202
3	(Croatia) Ivica Kostelić	200
4	(Switzerland) Silvan Zurbriggen	169
5	(Austria) Benjamin Raich	166

== Ladies' standings ==
=== Overall ===
Rank	after all 35 races	Points
1	(Austria) Nicole Hosp	1572
2	(Austria) Marlies Schild	1482
3	(United States) Julia Mancuso	1356
4	(Austria) Renate Goetschl	1300
5	(Sweden) Anja Pärson	885

=== Downhill ===
Rank	after all 9 races	Points
1	(Austria) Renate Götschl	705
2	(United States) Julia Mancuso	536
3	(United States) Lindsey Kildow	390
4	(Sweden) Anja Pärson	293
5	(France) Ingrid Jacquemod	264

=== Slalom ===
Rank	after all 9 races	Points
1	(Austria) Marlies Schild	760
2	(Austria) Nicole Hosp	418
3	(Czech Republic) Šárka Záhrobská	405
4	(Sweden) Therese Borssén	389
5	(Slovakia) Veronika Zuzulová	344

=== Giant slalom ===
Rank	after all 7 races	Points
1	(Austria) Nicole Hosp	490
2	(Finland) Tanja Poutiainen	419
3	(Austria) Michaela Kirchgasser	357
4	(United States) Julia Mancuso	275
5	(Germany) Kathrin Hölzl	228

=== Super G ===
Rank	after all 7 races	Points
1	(Austria) Renate Götschl	540
2	(Austria) Nicole Hosp	352
3	(United States) Lindsey Kildow	310
4	(United States) Julia Mancuso	273
5	(Austria) Alexandra Meissnitzer	207

=== Super combined ===
Rank	after all 3 races	Points
1	(Austria) Marlies Schild	220
2	(United States) Julia Mancuso	195
3	(Austria) Nicole Hosp	190
4	(Austria) Michaela Kirchgasser	152
5	(United States) Resi Stiegler	119

== Nations Cup ==
=== Overall ===
Rank	after all 71 races	Points
1	Austria	14735
2	Switzerland	5861
3	United States	5297
4	Italy	5136
5	Sweden	4177

=== Ladies ===
Rank	after all 35 races	Points
1	Austria	8125
2	United States	3143
3	Sweden	2340
4	Italy	2056
5	Switzerland	1879

=== Men ===
Rank	after all 36 races	Points
1	Austria	6610
2	Switzerland	3982
3	Italy	3080
4	Canada	2258
5	United States	2154

== See also ==
- FIS Alpine World Ski Championships 2007
