= World Junior Alpine Skiing Championships 2002 =

International skiing competition

The World Junior Alpine Skiing Championships 2002 were the 21st World Junior Alpine Skiing Championships, held between 27 February and 3 March 2002 in Tarvisio, Italy.

== Medal winners ==
=== Men's events ===
| Event | Gold | | Silver | | Bronze | |
|---|---|---|---|---|---|---|
| Downhill | Adam Cole; United States | 1:26.85 | Mario Scheiber; Austria | 1:27.23 | Aksel Lund Svindal; Norway | 1:27.26 |
| Super-G | Peter Fill; Italy | 1:25.02 | Aksel Lund Svindal; Norway; Peter Struger; Austria | 1:25.52 | Not awarded | |
| Giant Slalom; Canceled | N/A | N/A | N/A | N/A | N/A | N/A |
| Slalom | Steven Nyman; United States | 1:30.46 | Marc Berthod; Switzerland | 1:30.73 | Aksel Lund Svindal; Norway | 1:31.37 |
| Combined | Aksel Lund Svindal; Norway | 11.77 points | Steven Nyman; United States | 19.60 | Alexander Koll; Austria | 24.07 |

- Two silver medals were awarded in the Super-G.

=== Women's events ===
| Event | Gold | | Silver | | Bronze | |
|---|---|---|---|---|---|---|
| Downhill | Julia Mancuso; United States | 1:29.81 | Astrid Vierthaler; Austria | 1:29.95 | Nicole Hosp; Austria | 1:30.56 |
| Super-G | Maria Riesch; Germany | 1:27.54 | Daniela Müller; Austria | 1:28.55 | Kelly VanderBeek; Canada | 1:28.64 |
| Giant Slalom | Julia Mancuso; United States | 1:52.15 | Jessica Kelley; United States | 1:52.27 | Florence Roujas; France | 1:52.32 |
| Slalom | Veronika Zuzulová; Slovakia | 1:36.54 | Maria Riesch; Germany | 1:36.68 | Sandra Gini; Switzerland | 1:36.89 |
| Combined | Julia Mancuso; United States | 5.20 points | Tanya Bühler; Switzerland | 49.40 | Daniela Müller; Austria | 65.15 |
