= FIS Alpine World Ski Championships 2009 – Men's downhill =

Men's downhill at the FIS Alpine World Ski Championships 2009
- Venue: La face de Bellevarde
- Location: Val-d'Isère, France
- Dates: 7 February
- Competitors: 38 from 15 nations
- Winning time: 2:07.01

Medalists
gold medal	John Kucera	Canada
silver medal	Didier Cuche	Switzerland
bronze medal	Carlo Janka	Switzerland

Men's Downhill
- Location: La face de Bellevarde; Val-d'Isère, France
- Vertical: 959 m (3,146 ft)
- Top elevation: 2,807 m (9,209 ft)
- Base elevation: 1,848 m (6,063 ft)
- Longest run: 2.988 km (1.86 mi)

The Men's downhill competition of the 2009 World Championships at Val-d'Isère, France, was run on Saturday, February 7, the fourth race of the championships.

Canada's John Kucera won the gold medal, Didier Cuche of Switzerland took the silver, and the bronze medalist was Carlo Janka, also of Switzerland.

The La face de Bellevarde race course was 2.988 km (1.86 mi) in length, with a vertical drop of 959 m (3,146 ft) from a starting elevation of 2,807 m (9,209 ft) above sea level. Kucera's winning time of 127.01 seconds yielded an average speed of 84.6925 km/h (52.6 mph) and an average vertical descent rate of 7.5506 m/s (24.8 ft/s).

== Results ==
The race started at 11:00 CET (UTC+1) under partly cloudy skies. The air temperature was −7 °C (19 °F) at the starting gate and −1 °C (30 °F) at the finish.

Rank	Name	Country	Time	Diff.
1st place, gold medalist(s)	John Kucera	Canada	2:07.01	—
2nd place, silver medalist(s)	Didier Cuche	Switzerland	2:07.05	+0.04
3rd place, bronze medalist(s)	Carlo Janka	Switzerland	2:07.18	+0.17
4	Marco Büchel	Liechtenstein	2:07.53	+0.52
5	Adrien Théaux	France	2:07.95	+0.94
6	Hermann Maier	Austria	2:08.19	+1.18
7	Werner Heel	Italy	2:08.21	+1.20
8	Bode Miller	United States	2:08.38	+1.37
9	Klaus Kröll	Austria	2:08.61	+1.60
10	Christof Innerhofer	Italy	2:08.62	+1.61
11	Aksel Lund Svindal	Norway	2:08.71	+1.70
12	Michael Walchhofer	Austria	2:08.85	+1.84
13	Andrej Jerman	Slovenia	2:08.98	+1.97
14	Peter Fill	Italy	2:09.13	+2.12
15	Stephan Keppler	Germany	2:09.31	+2.30
16	Stefan Thanei	Italy	2:10.00	+2.99
17	Ambrosi Hoffmann	Switzerland	2:10.12	+3.11
18	Pierre-Emmanuel Dalcin	France	2:10.68	+3.67
19	Natko Zrnčić-Dim	Croatia	2:10.83	+3.82
20	Niklas Rainer	Sweden	2:11.02	+4.01
21	Douglas Crawford	United Kingdom	2:11.31	+4.30
22	Rok Perko	Slovenia	2:11.57	+4.56
23	Tin Široki	Croatia	2:11.78	+4.77
24	Petr Záhrobský	Czech Republic	2:11.84	+4.83
25	Marco Sullivan	United States	2:12.16	+5.15
26	Paul de la Cuesta	Spain	2:13.03	+6.02
27	Edward Drake	United Kingdom	2:14.47	+7.46
28	Ferran Terra	Spain	2:16.23	+9.22
–	Christoph Gruber	Austria	DNF	–
–	Jan Hudec	Canada	DNF	–
–	Manuel Osborne-Paradis	Canada	DNF	–
–	Erik Guay	Canada	DNF	–
–	Didier Défago	Switzerland	DNF	–
–	David Poisson	France	DNF	–
–	Andrew Weibrecht	United States	DNF	–
–	Hans Olsson	Sweden	DNF	–
–	Lars Elton Myhre	Norway	DNF	–
–	Erik Fisher	United States	DNF	–
