= FIS Alpine World Ski Championships 2017 – Men's alpine combined =

Men's alpine combined at the FIS Alpine World Ski Championships 2017
- Venue: Piz Nair
- Location: St. Moritz, Switzerland
- Dates: 13 February
- Competitors: 56 from 23 nations
- Winning time: 2:26.33

Medalists
gold medal	Luca Aerni	Switzerland
silver medal	Marcel Hirscher	Austria
bronze medal	Mauro Caviezel	Switzerland

The men's alpine combined competition at the 2017 World Championships was held on 13 February 2017.

== Results ==
The downhill race was started at 10:00 and the slalom race at 13:00.

Rank	Bib	Name	Nation	Downhill	Rank	Slalom	Rank	Total	Diff
1st place, gold medalist(s)	6	Luca Aerni	Switzerland	1:41.86	30	44.47	1	2:26.33	
2nd place, silver medalist(s)	11	Marcel Hirscher	Austria	1:41.55	28	44.79	2	2:26.34	+0.01
3rd place, bronze medalist(s)	1	Mauro Caviezel	Switzerland	1:40.30	14	46.09	3	2:26.39	+0.06
4	19	Dominik Paris	Italy	1:39.94	8	46.79	11	2:26.73	+0.40
4	15	Aleksander Aamodt Kilde	Norway	1:40.63	19	46.10	4	2:26.73	+0.40
6	7	Justin Murisier	Switzerland	1:40.43	16	46.39	7	2:26.82	+0.49
7	4	Carlo Janka	Switzerland	1:39.93	6	47.08	16	2:27.01	+0.68
8	14	Vincent Kriechmayr	Austria	1:40.12	12	46.96	15	2:27.08	+0.75
9	16	Adrien Théaux	France	1:39.37	2	47.73	19	2:27.10	+0.77
10	9	Alexis Pinturault	France	1:40.71	20	46.48	7	2:27.19	+0.86
11	2	Bryce Bennett	United States	1:40.51	18	46.82	12	2:27.33	+1.00
12	3	Romed Baumann	Austria	1:39.25	1	48.20	24	2:27.45	+1.12
13	20	Martin Čater	Slovenia	1:39.57	3	47.93	21	2:27.50	+1.17
14	21	Thomas Dressen	Germany	1:39.57	3	47.96	22	2:27.53	+1.20
15	24	Brennan Rubie	United States	1:41.47	25	46.19	5	2:27.66	+1.33
16	30	Bjørnar Neteland	Norway	1:41.49	27	46.20	6	2:27.69	+1.36
17	8	Matthias Mayer	Austria	1:40.07	10	47.85	20	2:27.92	+1.59
18	31	Pavel Trikhichev	Russia	1:41.66	29	46.49	9	2:28.15	+1.82
19	22	Ryan Cochran-Siegle	United States	1:41.04	24	47.56	17	2:28.60	+2.27
20	13	Victor Muffat-Jeandet	France	1:42.08	32	46.63	10	2:28.71	+2.38
21	28	Jared Goldberg	United States	1:40.08	11	48.75	29	2:28.83	+2.50
22	18	Klemen Kosi	Slovenia	1:40.95	21	48.08	23	2:29.03	+2.70
23	33	Andreas Sander	Germany	1:39.92	5	49.33	33	2:29.25	+2.92
23	29	Riccardo Tonetti	Italy	1:42.41	35	46.84	13	2:29.25	+2.92
25	37	Josef Ferstl	Germany	1:39.95	9	49.43	34	2:29.38	+3.05
26	44	Christoffer Faarup	Denmark	1:40.99	22	48.42	27	2:29.41	+3.08
27	53	Joan Verdu	Andorra	1:41.47	25	48.25	25	2:29.72	+3.39
28	27	Štefan Hadalin	Slovenia	1:43.25	44	46.93	14	2:30.18	+3.85
29	25	Kryštof Krýzl	Czech Republic	1:42.57	38	47.64	18	2:30.21	+3.88
30	42	Maciej Bydliński	Poland	1:41.92	31	49.15	32	2:31.08	+4.75
31	38	Henrik von Appen	Chile	1:40.99	22	50.11	36	2:31.10	+4.77
32	32	Ondřej Berndt	Czech Republic	1:42.95	41	48.26	26	2:31.21	+4.88
33	41	Ivan Kuznetsov	Russia	1:42.43	36	48.81	30	2:31.24	+4.91
34	43	Marco Pfiffner	Liechtenstein	1:42.75	40	48.69	28	2:31.44	+5.11
35	51	Cristian Javier Simari Birkner	Argentina	1:43.50	45	48.96	31	2:32.46	+6.13
36	35	Marko Vukićević	Serbia	1:42.29	34	50.85	39	2:33.14	+6.81
37	40	Marc Oliveras	Andorra	1:42.15	33	51.56	41	2:33.71	+7.38
38	47	Jan Zabystřan	Czech Republic	1:43.93	47	49.97	35	2:33.90	+7.57
39	45	Filip Forejtek	Czech Republic	1:43.98	49	50.30	37	2:34.28	+7.95
40	50	Andreas Žampa	Slovakia	1:43.84	46	51.75	42	2:35.59	+9.26
41	57	Igor Zakurdayev	Kazakhstan	1:43.96	48	51.83	43	2:35.79	+9.46
42	54	Marko Stevović	Serbia	1:44.99	50	50.94	40	2:35.93	+9.60
43	56	Márton Kékesi	Hungary	1:46.88	54	50.41	38	2:37.29	+10.96
44	48	Sven von Appen	Chile	1:45.58	52	52.33	44	2:37.91	+11.58
45	58	Albin Tahiri	Kosovo	1:45.28	51	53.22	45	2:48.50	+12.17
—	5	Maxence Muzaton	France	1:40.44	17	DNF			
—	23	Mattia Casse	Italy	1:40.20	13	DNF			
—	26	Filip Zubčić	Croatia	1:42.43	36	DNF			
—	34	Marco Schwarz	Austria	1:42.67	39	DNF			
—	36	Tilen Debelak	Slovenia	1:43.06	43	DNF			
—	46	Felix Monsén	Sweden	1:40.37	15	DNF			
—	52	Kai Horwitz	Chile	1:46.74	53	DNF			
—	55	Martin Bendík	Slovakia	1:43.02	42	DNF			
—	12	Adam Žampa	Slovakia	1:47.67	55	DNS			
—	17	Kjetil Jansrud	Norway	1:39.93	6	DNS			
—	10	Peter Fill	Italy	DNF					
—	39	Alexander Köll	Sweden	DNS					
—	49	Michał Kłusak	Poland	DNS					
—	59	Ioan Valeriu Achiriloaie	Romania	DNS					
