= Debelak =

Debelak is a surname. Notable people with the surname include:

- Matjaž Debelak (born 1965), Slovenian ski jumper
- Tilen Debelak (born 1991), Slovenian alpine skier
