= 2007 Alpine Skiing World Cup – Men's slalom =

2007 Men's slalom World Cup
| Previous: 2006 | Next: 2008 |

The Men's slalom World Cup 2006/2007 involved 10 events at sites in North America and Europe between November 2006 and March 2007.

== Calendar ==
| Round | Race No | Place | Country | Date | Winner | Second | Third |
|---|---|---|---|---|---|---|---|
| 1 | 1 | Levi | Finland | November 12, 2006 | (Austria) Benjamin Raich | (Sweden) Markus Larsson | (Italy) Giorgio Rocca |
| 2 | 7 | Beaver Creek | United States | December 3, 2006 | (Sweden) André Myhrer | (Canada) Michael Janyk | (Germany) Felix Neureuther |
| 3 | 12 | Alta Badia | Italy | December 18, 2006 | (Sweden) Markus Larsson | (United States) Ted Ligety | (Croatia) Ivica Kostelić |
| 4 | 18 | Adelboden | Switzerland | January 7, 2007 | (Switzerland) Marc Berthod | (Austria) Benjamin Raich | (Austria) Mario Matt |
| 5 | 22 | Kitzbühel | Austria | January 27, 2007 | (Sweden) Jens Byggmark | (Austria) Mario Matt | (Germany) Alois Vogl |
| 6 | 23 | Kitzbühel | Austria | January 28, 2007 | (Sweden) Jens Byggmark | (Austria) Mario Matt | (Italy) Manfred Mölgg |
| 7 | 24 | Schladming | Austria | January 30, 2007 | (Austria) Benjamin Raich | (Sweden) Jens Byggmark | (Austria) Mario Matt |
| 8 | 27 | Garmisch | Germany | February 25, 2007 | (Austria) Mario Matt | (Germany) Felix Neureuther | (Austria) Benjamin Raich |
| 9 | 29 | Kranjska Gora | Slovenia | March 4, 2007 | (Austria) Mario Matt | (Austria) Benjamin Raich | (Italy) Manfred Mölgg |
| 10 | 36 | Lenzerheide | Switzerland | March 18, 2007 | (Austria) Benjamin Raich | (Austria) Mario Matt | (Italy) Manfred Mölgg |

== Final point standings ==
In men's slalom World Cup 2006/07 all results count.

| Place | Name | Country | Total points | 1 (Finland) | 7 (United States) | 12 (Italy) | 18 (Switzerland) | 22 (Austria) | 23 (Austria) | 24 (Austria) | 27 (Germany) | 29 (Slovenia) | 36 (Switzerland) |
|---|---|---|---|---|---|---|---|---|---|---|---|---|---|
| 1 | Benjamin Raich | Austria | 605 | 100 | - | - | 80 | 45 | 40 | 100 | 60 | 80 | 100 |
| 2 | Mario Matt | Austria | 600 | 22 | 18 | - | 60 | 80 | 80 | 60 | 100 | 100 | 80 |
| 3 | Jens Byggmark | Sweden | 490 | 40 | 45 | 26 | 32 | 100 | 100 | 80 | 22 | - | 45 |
| 4 | Markus Larsson | Sweden | 340 | 80 | - | 100 | 45 | - | 24 | 22 | 29 | 40 | - |
| 5 | Manfred Mölgg | Italy | 334 | - | - | 11 | 36 | 22 | 60 | 40 | 45 | 60 | 60 |
| 6 | Marc Berthod | Switzerland | 322 | - | - | - | 100 | - | 50 | 50 | 36 | 36 | 50 |
| 7 | Michael Janyk | Canada | 279 | 36 | 80 | - | 29 | 29 | - | - | 50 | 26 | 29 |
| 8 | Felix Neureuther | Germany | 264 | 13 | 60 | 13 | 13 | 40 | 45 | - | 80 | - | - |
| 9 | Kalle Palander | Finland | 247 | 24 | 22 | 45 | 50 | 13 | 29 | - | 40 | - | 24 |
| 10 | Jean-Baptiste Grange | France | 242 | - | 20 | 32 | 20 | - | 16 | 32 | 32 | 50 | 40 |
| 11 | Giorgio Rocca | Italy | 213 | 60 | - | 50 | 40 | 18 | - | 45 | - | - | - |
| 12 | Manfred Pranger | Austria | 207 | 29 | 36 | - | - | - | 32 | 29 | - | 45 | 36 |
| 13 | André Myhrer | Sweden | 188 | - | 100 | - | - | 26 | - | 36 | 6 | - | 20 |
| 14 | Silvan Zurbriggen | Switzerland | 171 | 26 | 16 | 13 | - | 50 | 20 | - | - | 20 | 26 |
| 15 | Ted Ligety | United States | 170 | - | - | 80 | - | 16 | 36 | 14 | - | 6 | 18 |
| 16 | Ivica Kostelić | Croatia | 144 | - | - | 60 | - | 36 | - | - | - | 26 | 22 |
| 17 | Cristian Deville | Italy | 133 | 8 | 24 | 18 | 15 | - | 8 | 16 | 26 | 18 | - |
| 18 | Thomas Grandi | Canada | 126 | 32 | 45 | 18 | - | - | - | - | 18 | 13 | - |
| 19 | Marc Gini | Switzerland | 124 | - | 26 | - | 8 | 26 | 26 | - | 9 | 29 | - |
| 20 | Reinfried Herbst | Austria | 121 | - | - | - | - | 10 | 13 | 24 | 20 | 22 | 32 |
| 21 | Aksel Lund Svindal | Norway | 118 | 11 | 14 | 11 | - | 20 | 15 | 20 | 11 | - | 16 |
| 22 | Daniel Albrecht | Switzerland | 104 | - | 50 | - | 26 | - | - | 12 | 16 | - | - |
| 23 | Akira Sasaki | Japan | 90 | - | - | 36 | 18 | - | - | - | - | 36 | - |
| 24 | Martin Hansson | Sweden | 89 | 15 | - | 15 | - | - | 22 | 26 | - | 11 | - |
| | Julien Lizeroux | France | 89 | - | - | 40 | 22 | - | 14 | - | 13 | - | - |
| 26 | Rainer Schönfelder | Austria | 86 | 45 | - | - | - | 32 | - | - | - | 9 | - |
| 27 | Anton Lahdenperä | Sweden | 73 | - | 29 | 7 | 12 | - | - | 9 | - | 16 | - |
| 28 | Johan Brolenius | Sweden | 72 | - | - | 14 | - | - | 9 | 15 | 24 | 10 | - |
| | Alois Vogl | Germany | 70 | 10 | - | - | - | 60 | - | - | - | - | - |
| 30 | Bernard Vajdič | Slovenia | 66 | 7 | 10 | 29 | - | - | - | 13 | 7 | - | - |
| 31 | Jimmy Cochran | United States | 57 | 16 | 9 | 20 | - | 12 | - | - | - | - | - |
| 32 | Mitja Valenčič | Slovenia | 54 | - | - | 11 | 9 | - | - | 20 | - | 14 | - |
| 33 | Alexandre Anselmet | France | 52 | - | 36 | 6 | - | - | 10 | - | - | - | - |
| 34 | Stéphane Tissot | France | 50 | 50 | - | - | - | - | - | - | - | - | - |
| 35 | Alexander Koll | Austria | 47 | - | - | - | - | 14 | 18 | 11 | 4 | - | - |
| 36 | Pierrick Bourgeat | France | 45 | 9 | - | - | - | 15 | 11 | - | 10 | - | - |
| 37 | Kurt Engl | Austria | 44 | - | - | - | 16 | 11 | 12 | - | 5 | - | - |
| 38 | Patrick Thaler | Italy | 36 | - | - | 24 | - | - | - | - | 12 | - | - |
| 39 | Mitja Dragšič | Slovenia | 34 | - | - | 8 | 14 | - | - | - | - | 12 | - |
| 40 | Romed Baumann | Austria | 28 | 18 | - | - | 10 | - | - | - | - | - | - |
| | Truls Ove Karlsen | Norway | 28 | - | 13 | - | - | - | - | - | - | 15 | - |
| 42 | Ondřej Bank | Czech Republic | 24 | - | - | - | 24 | - | - | - | - | - | - |
| | Gaetan Llorach | France | 24 | - | - | - | - | 9 | - | - | 15 | - | - |
| 44 | Sandro Viletta | Switzerland | 22 | - | - | - | - | - | - | - | 15 | 7 | - |
| | Oscar Andersson | Sweden | 22 | - | - | 22 | - | - | - | - | - | - | - |
| 46 | Filip Trejbal | Czech Republic | 20 | - | 12 | - | - | 8 | - | - | - | - | - |
| | Kentaro Minagawa | Japan | 20 | 20 | - | - | - | - | - | - | - | - | - |
| 48 | Mattias Hargin | Sweden | 19 | - | - | - | 11 | - | - | 8 | - | - | - |
| 49 | Andreas Omminger | Austria | 15 | - | 15 | - | - | - | - | - | - | - | - |
| 50 | Jukka Leino | Finland | 14 | 14 | - | - | - | - | - | - | - | - | - |
| 51 | Patrick Biggs | Canada | 12 | 12 | - | - | - | - | - | - | - | - | - |
| 52 | Paul Stutz | Canada | 11 | - | 11 | - | - | - | - | - | - | - | - |
| 53 | Fredrik Nordh | Sweden | 10 | - | - | - | - | - | - | 10 | - | - | - |
| 54 | Steve Missillier | France | 9 | 6 | - | - | - | - | - | - | 3 | - | - |
| 55 | Bode Miller | United States | 8 | - | - | - | - | - | - | - | - | 8 | - |
| | Christoph Dreier | Austria | 8 | - | - | - | - | - | - | - | 8 | - | - |
| 57 | Giuliano Razzoli | Italy | 7 | - | - | - | - | 7 | - | - | - | - | - |
| 58 | Hans-Petter Buraas | Norway | 5 | 5 | - | - | - | - | - | - | - | - | - |
| 59 | Aleš Gorza | Slovenia | 4 | 4 | - | - | - | - | - | - | - | - | - |
| 60 | Naoki Yuasa | Japan | 2 | - | - | - | - | - | - | - | 2 | - | - |

Note:

In the last race only the best racers were allowed to compete and only the best 15 finishers were awarded with points.

== Men's slalom team results ==
bold = highest score italics = race wins

| Place | Country | Total points | 1 (Finland) | 7 (United States) | 12 (Italy) | 18 (Switzerland) | 22 (Austria) | 23 (Austria) | 24 (Austria) | 27 (Germany) | 29 (Slovenia) | 36 (Switzerland) | Racers | Wins |
|---|---|---|---|---|---|---|---|---|---|---|---|---|---|---|
| 1 | Austria | 1761 | 214 | 69 | - | 166 | 192 | 195 | 224 | 197 | **256** | 248 | 10 | 5 |
| 2 | Sweden | 1303 | 135 | 174 | 184 | 100 | 126 | 155 | 206 | 81 | 122 | 20 | 9 | 4 |
| 3 | Switzerland | 743 | 26 | 92 | 13 | 134 | 76 | 96 | 62 | 76 | 92 | 76 | 5 | 1 |
| 4 | Italy | 723 | 68 | 24 | 103 | 91 | 47 | 68 | 101 | 83 | 78 | 60 | 5 | 0 |
| 5 | France | 511 | 65 | 56 | 78 | 42 | 24 | 51 | 32 | 73 | 50 | 40 | 7 | 0 |
| 6 | Canada | 428 | 80 | 136 | 18 | 29 | 29 | - | - | 68 | 39 | 29 | 4 | 0 |
| 7 | Germany | 334 | 23 | 60 | 13 | 13 | 100 | 45 | - | 80 | - | - | 2 | 0 |
| 8 | Finland | 247 | 38 | 22 | 45 | 50 | 13 | 29 | - | 40 | - | 24 | 2 | 0 |
| 9 | United States | 235 | 16 | 9 | 100 | - | 28 | 36 | 14 | - | 14 | 18 | 3 | 0 |
| 10 | Slovenia | 158 | 11 | 10 | 48 | 23 | - | - | 33 | 7 | 26 | - | 4 | 0 |
| 11 | Norway | 151 | 16 | 27 | 11 | - | 20 | 15 | 20 | 11 | 15 | 16 | 3 | 0 |
| 12 | Croatia | 144 | - | - | 60 | - | 36 | - | - | - | 26 | 22 | 1 | 0 |
| 13 | Japan | 112 | 20 | - | 36 | 18 | - | - | - | 2 | 36 | - | 3 | 0 |
| 14 | Czech Republic | 44 | - | 12 | - | 24 | 8 | - | - | - | - | - | 2 | 0 |

**Alpine Skiing World Cup**
**Men**

Overall | Downhill | Super G | Giant slalom | Slalom | Combined

**2007**
