= Manuel Osborne-Paradis =

Canadian alpine skier (born 1984)

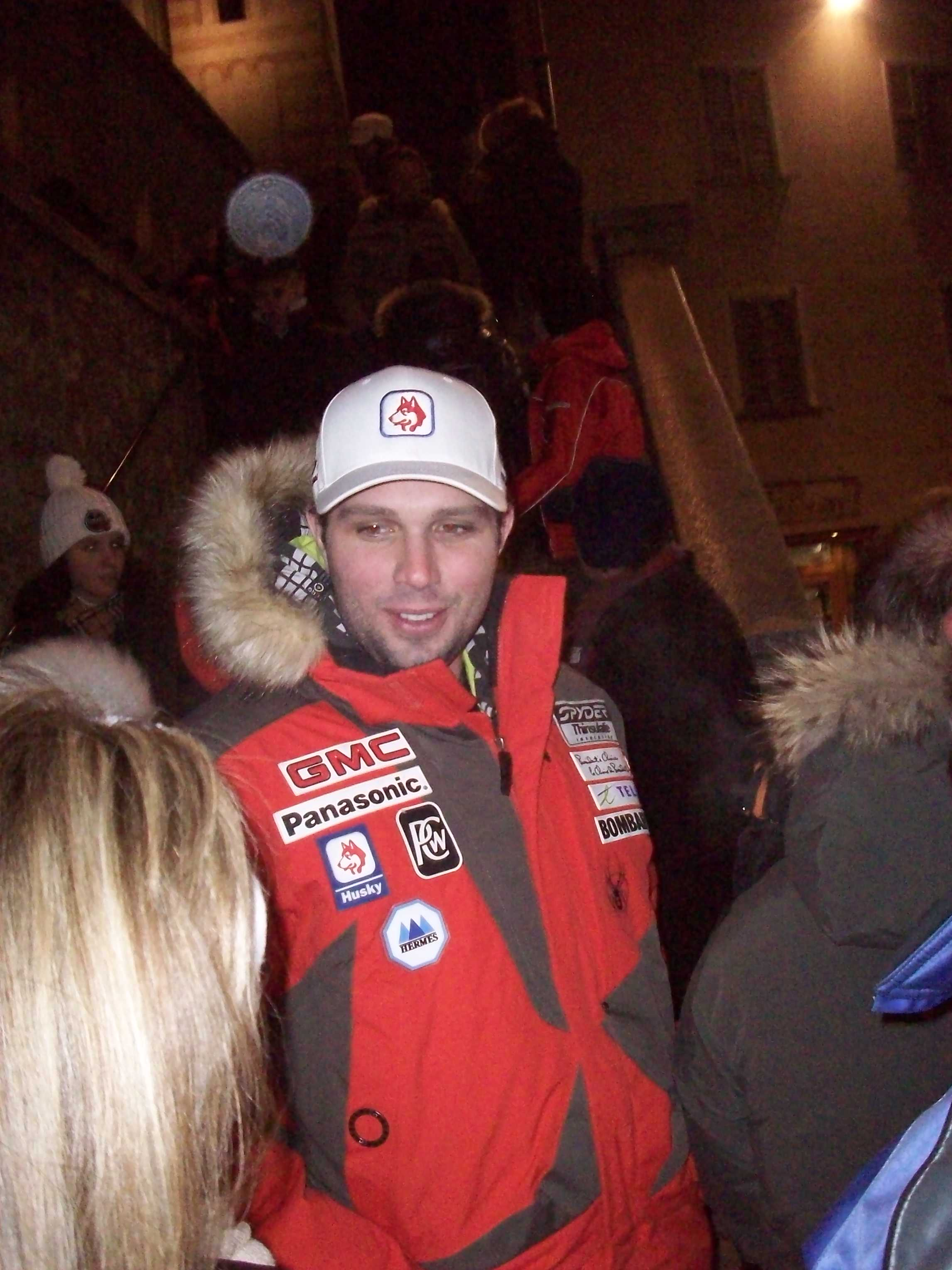
- Osborne-Paradis in 2008

Personal information
- Born: 8 February 1984 (age 42) North Vancouver, British Columbia, Canada
- Height: 1.83 m (6 ft 0 in)
- Website: mannyski.com

Skiing career
- Sport: Alpine skiing
- Club: Whistler Mountain S.C.
- Disciplines: Downhill, Super-G
- World Cup debut: 8 January, 2005 (age 20)

Olympics
- Teams: 4 – (2006–2018)
- Medals: 0

World Championships
- Teams: 6 – (2005–09, 13–17)
- Medals: 1 (0 gold)

World Cup
- Seasons: 13 – (2005–2011, 2013–2018)
- Wins: 3 – (2 DH, 1 SG)
- Podiums: 11 – (10 DH, 1 SG)
- Overall titles: 0 – (16th in 2010)
- Discipline titles: 0 – (4th in DH in 2010)
Medal record
World Championships
Bronze medal – third place	2017 St. Moritz	Super-G
Junior World Championships
Silver medal – second place	2004 Maribor	Super G

Manuel Osborne-Paradis (born 8 February 1984) is a Canadian former World Cup alpine ski racer.

Born in North Vancouver, British Columbia, Osborne-Paradis grew up racing for the Whistler Mountain Ski Club. His first World Cup podium came in November 2006 at the Bombardier Winterstart men's downhill in Lake Louise, Alberta, Canada. His first victory was at the downhill of Kvitfjell in March 2009.

In April 2008, he joined forces with teammate Mike Janyk to provide a four-day training camp free of charge to underprivileged Canadian racers from around British Columbia. The camp, known locally as the "Cowboys Camp", took place on Whistler Mountain. but known in the community as Mike & Manny Camp.

On 29 January 2011, Osborne-Paradis crashed badly at the downhill race in Chamonix, France, and was airlifted by helicopter and treated for a broken fibula. He missed the 2011 World Championships and the remainder of the 2011 season, as well as the 2012 season.

Osborne-Paradis was a surprise bronze medalist in super-G at the 2017 World Championships, behind teammate Erik Guay and Norway's Kjetil Jansrud. Racing in bib number 26, outside the top group of racers, he won the medal on his 33rd birthday.

In a training run at Lake Louise in November 2018, Osborne-Paradis crashed and suffered a broken leg, ending his season.

== World Cup results ==
=== Season standings ===
Season	Age	Overall	Slalom	Giant Slalom	Super G	Downhill	Combined
2005	21	93	—	—	50	37	—
2006	22	77	—	—	45	29	40
2007	23	38	—	—	—	12	—
2008	24	32	—	—	33	6	—
2009	25	25	—	—	30	5	—
2010	26	16	—	—	9	4	—
2011	27	60	—	—	27	28	—
2012	28	out for season: injured in January 2011					
2013	29	43	—	—	30	13	—
2014	30	41	—	—	27	18	—
2015	31	33	—	—	25	14	—
2016	32	54	—	—	33	21	—
2017	33	28	—	—	20	11	—
2018	34	41	—	—	24	17	—
2019	35	out for season: injured in November					

=== Race podiums ===
- 3 wins – (2 DH, 1 SG)
- 11 podiums – (10 DH, 1 SG)

Season	Date	Location	Discipline	Place
2007	25 Nov 2006	Lake Louise, Canada	Downhill	2nd
2007	20 Jan 2007	Val-d'Isère, France	Downhill	3rd
2008	13 Jan 2008	Wengen, Switzerland	Downhill	3rd
2009	20 Dec 2008	Val Gardena, Italy	Downhill	3rd
2009	6 Mar 2009	Kvitfjell, Norway	Downhill	1st
2009	7 Mar 2009	Kvitfjell, Norway	Downhill	3rd
2010	29 Nov 2009	Lake Louise, Canada	Super-G	1st
2010	19 Dec 2009	Val Gardena, Italy	Downhill	1st
2010	16 Jan 2010	Wengen, Switzerland	Downhill	2nd
2015	29 Nov 2014	Lake Louise, Canada	Downhill	2nd
2015	7 Mar 2015	Kvitfjell, Norway	Downhill	2nd

== World Championship results ==
Year	Age	Slalom	Giant slalom	Super-G	Downhill	Combined
2005	21	—	—	—	19	17
2007	23	—	—	—	9	—
2009	25	—	—	DNF	DNF	—
2011	27	injured, did not compete				
2013	29	—	—	16	18	—
2015	31	—	—	DNF	21	—
2017	33	—	—	3	—	—
2019	35	injured, did not compete				

== Olympic results ==
Year	Age	Slalom	Giant slalom	Super-G	Downhill	Combined
2006	22	—	—	20	13	DNS
2010	26	—	—	DNF	17	—
2014	30	—	—	24	25	—
2018	34	—	—	22	14	DNF
