= Jan Hudec =

Czech-Canadian alpine ski racer (born 1981)

Personal information
- Born: August 19, 1981 (age 44) Šumperk, Czechoslovakia
- Height: 183 cm (6 ft 0 in)

Skiing career
- Sport: Alpine skiing
- Club: Banff Alpine Racers
- Disciplines: Downhill, Super-G
- World Cup debut: February 2, 2002 (age 20)

Olympics
- Teams: 3 – (2010, 2014, 2018)
- Medals: 1 (0 gold)

World Championships
- Teams: 5 – (2003, 2007–13, 2017)
- Medals: 1 (0 gold)

World Cup
- Seasons: 12 – (2004–15)
- Wins: 2 – (2 DH)
- Podiums: 5 – (3 DH, 2 SG)
- Overall titles: 0 – (16th in 2012)
- Discipline titles: 0 – (6th in SG, 2012)
Medal record
Men's alpine skiing
Representing Canada
Olympic Games
Bronze medal – third place	2014 Sochi	Super-G
World Championships
Silver medal – second place	2007 Åre	Downhill

Jan Hudec Jr. (born August 19, 1981) is a Czech-Canadian alpine ski racer who previously represented Canada until 2016 and specializes in the speed events of downhill and super-G. Beset by injuries for several seasons, he returned to World Cup form in 2012 at age 30 and gained his second victory. At the 2014 Winter Olympics, Hudec won the bronze medal in the super-G at Rosa Khutor. It was the first Olympic medal for Canada in men's alpine skiing in 20 years.

== Early life ==
Born in Šumperk, Czechoslovakia, Hudec defected in a homemade raft with his parents to West Germany while an infant. The family moved to Canada in 1986 and settled in Red Deer, Alberta, where Jan Sr. was a ski coach. In 1993 the Hudecs, now a family of four with younger brother Phil, moved to Banff where both parents worked at the Banff Mountain Ski Academy.

== Career ==
Hudec emerged as a World Cup downhiller in February 2007; he won the silver medal in downhill at the 2007 World Championships in Åre, Sweden, followed up with a fifth place at Garmisch, Germany. That November he won his first World Cup event, a downhill in Lake Louise, but suffered a season-ending knee injury while training in Switzerland two months later. In January 2009, Hudec had a comeback at the Lauberhorn downhill in Wengen, Switzerland, where he finished eighth, but three weeks later an injury at the 2009 World Championships downhill in Val-d'Isère, France, ended his 2009 season.

In the following two seasons, Hudec battled injuries and had just one top-ten result, a tenth-place finish in March 2011. His results improved significantly in the 2012 season, which included his second World Cup victory in February at the Kandahar downhill in Chamonix, France. Later that month he ascended his first World Cup super-G podium as the runner-up at Crans-Montana, Switzerland.

At the 2014 Olympics in Sochi, Hudec competed in several events, and was twentieth in the downhill. Hudec next competed in the super-G and won bronze, tied with Bode Miller. After the race he noted to local media that had buried a lucky loonie at the finish line of the race. Upon commenting he noted to CBC Sports that "Who cares if it helped. That loonie is worth more than a buck now, I can tell you that." The medal was the first for Canada in alpine skiing at the Olympics in twenty years.

Left off Canada's team for the 2016–17 season, Hudec competed for the Czech Republic at the 2017 World Championships and 2018 Winter Olympics.

In 2019, the native Welsh band 'Papur Wal' released a song commemorating Hudec's childhood and career. Called 'Yn Y Weriniaeth Tsiec' the song translates from Welsh to 'In The Czech Republic'. An upbeat indie classic, the song proved to be a hit in Wales especially among the indie music scene in the country which is spearheaded by the nations young people. Hudec was shown the song recently he described it as 'the best song I've ever heard' following on by thanking Papur Wal and expressing his love and gratitude to the Welsh people and Wales as a country.

== World Cup results ==
=== Season standings ===
Season	Age	Overall	Slalom	Giant slalom	Super-G	Downhill	Combined
2003	21	123	—	—	44	—	—
2004	22	116	—	—	36	—	—
2005	23	91	—	—	45	37	—
2006	24	injured, out for season					
2007	25	69	—	—	29	31	—
2008	26	37	—	—	24	13	—
2009	27	101	—	—	—	39	—
2010	28	102	—	—	38	44	—
2011	29	75	—	—	45	26	—
2012	30	16	—	—	6	9	—
2013	31	35	—	—	15	21	—
2014	32	34	—	—	11	24	—
2015	33	82	—	—	30	43	—

=== Top ten finishes ===
- 2 wins – (2 DH)
- 5 podiums – (3 DH, 2 SG)

Season	Date	Location	Discipline	Place
2005	Nov 27, 2004	Lake Louise, Canada	Downhill	7th
2007	Feb 24, 2007	Garmisch, Germany	Downhill	5th
2008	Nov 24, 2007	Lake Louise, Canada	Downhill	1st
2008	Nov 25, 2007	Lake Louise, Canada	Super-G	8th
2008	Dec 3, 2007	Beaver Creek, USA	Super-G	9th
2008	Dec 14, 2007	Val Gardena, Italy	Super-G	9th
2008	Dec 29, 2007	Bormio, Italy	Downhill	3rd
2009	Jan 17, 2009	Wengen, Switzerland	Downhill	8th
2011	Mar 11, 2011	Kvitfjell, Norway	Downhill	10th
2012	Nov 27, 2011	Lake Louise, Canada	Super-G	4th
2012	Dec 16, 2011	Val Gardena, Italy	Super-G	10th
2012	Jan 21, 2012	Kitzbühel, Austria	Downhill	10th
2012	Feb 3, 2012	Chamonix, France	Downhill	6th
2012	Feb 4, 2012	Chamonix, France	Downhill	1st
2012	Feb 24, 2012	Crans-Montana, Switzerland	Super-G	2nd
2012	Feb 25, 2012	Crans-Montana, Switzerland	Super-G	5th
2012	Mar 8, 2012	Kvitfjell, Norway	Super-G	6th
2012	Mar 14, 2012	Schladming, Austria	Downhill	8th
2013	Dec 1, 2012	Beaver Creek, USA	Super-G	10th
2013	Mar 2, 2013	Kvitfjell, Norway	Downhill	6th
2014	Dec 1, 2013	Lake Louise, Canada	Super-G	10th
2014	Dec 6, 2013	Beaver Creek, USA	Downhill	7th
2014	Dec 20, 2013	Val Gardena, Italy	Super-G	2nd

== Videos ==
- FIS Alpine.com – Jan Hudec speaks Czech (with Ondřej Bank) and talks about his roots – 2011-03-12
- YouTube.com – Hudec's winning DH run at Lake Louise – 2007-11-24
- YouTube.com – Jan Hudec wins at Chamonix – from Universal Sports – 2012-02-03

== World Championship results ==
Year	Age	Slalom	Giant slalom	Super-G	Downhill	Combined
2003	21	—	—	7	—	—
2005	23	—	—	—	—	—
2007	25	—	—	7	2	—
2009	27	—	—	—	DNF	—
2011	29	—	—	DNF	25	—
2013	31	—	—	12	9	—
2015	33	—	—	—	—	—
2017	35	—	—	32	39	—

== Olympic results ==
Year	Age	Slalom	Giant slalom	Super-G	Downhill	Combined
2010	28	—	—	24	25	—
2014	32	—	—	3	21	—
2018	36	—	—	DNF	45	—
