= Erik Guay =

Canadian alpine skier (born 1981)

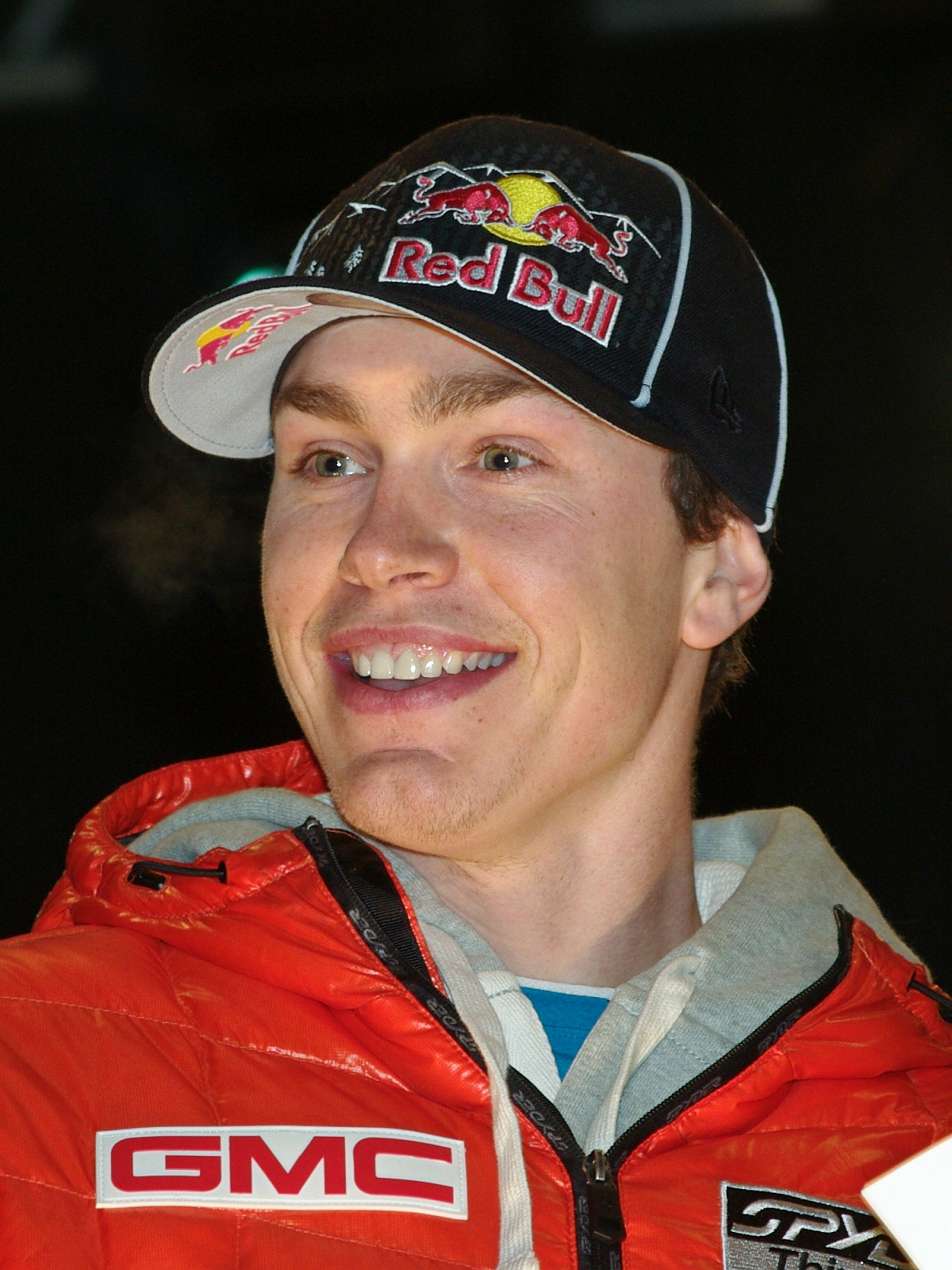
- Guay in February 2011

Personal information
- Born: August 5, 1981 (age 45) Montreal, Quebec, Canada
- Height: 1.81 m (5 ft 11 in)
- Website: erikguay.com

Skiing career
- Sport: Alpine skiing
- Club: Mont-Tremblant
- Retired: November 2018 (age 37)
- Disciplines: Downhill, super-G
- World Cup debut: December 10, 2000 (age 19)

Olympics
- Teams: 3 – (2006, 2010, 2014)
- Medals: 0

World Championships
- Teams: 6 – (2003–17)
- Medals: 3 (2 gold)

World Cup
- Seasons: 15 – (2003–14, 2016–18)
- Wins: 5 – (3 DH, 2 SG)
- Podiums: 25 – (17 DH, 8 SG)
- Overall titles: 0 – (12th in 2007)
- Discipline titles: 1 – (SG, 2010)
Medal record
World Cup race podiums
Event	1st	2nd	3rd
Downhill	3	6	8
Super-G	2	2	4
Total	5	8	12
World Championships
Gold medal – first place	2011 Garmisch	Downhill
Gold medal – first place	2017 St. Moritz	Super-G
Silver medal – second place	2017 St. Moritz	Downhill

Erik Guay (/ɡeɪ/) (born August 5, 1981) is a Canadian former World Cup alpine ski racer. Racing out of Mont-Tremblant, Quebec, Guay won the World Cup season title in super-G in 2010 and was the world champion in downhill in 2011, as well as in the super-G in 2017. With 25 World Cup podiums, he is the career leader for Canada.

== Career ==
Born in Montreal, Guay was five when he competed in his first ski race, and when he was twelve his father, himself a ski team coach, took him for professional coaching.

His first podium came in November 2003, when he finished 2nd in a downhill at Lake Louise. He finished in second twice in 2005 in the super-G and third once in downhill. Guay suffered an injury two weeks before the 2006 Winter Olympics, and withdrew from the downhill but finished in fourth place in the super-G, missing the podium by a tenth of a second.

He won his first World Cup race the following season at Garmisch, Germany. He was the first Canadian to win a World Cup men's downhill race since 1994, and the first man ever from Québec. Guay's performance in alpine skiing over the 2007 season was enough to place him in third position in the final world cup standings. In 2009, Guay achieved ten top-20 finishes in World Cup speed events but reached only one podium, a third.

The 2010 Winter Olympics took place on home soil for Guay and he competed in three events in Whistler, where he narrowly missed the podium finishing in fifth place twice. Following the games, he achieved three straight podiums during March, including wins in the last two super-G races of the season, which enabled him to come from behind to win the discipline trophy in super-G in 2010 Alpine Skiing World Cup. Guay became the first Canadian man to win a crystal globe for a discipline title since Steve Podborski in 1982.

Guay struggled with knee issues during the 2011 season, forcing him to miss events at both Kitzbühel and Wengen. During the 2011 World Championships at Garmisch, Guay won the downhill after not finishing the super-G earlier in the week. The win was Guay's only World Championship medal, and the second consecutive Canadian to win the world title in downhill, following John Kucera in 2009.

Guay continued to find the podium during the 2014 season. His victory at Val Gardena in December was his fourth and the twentieth World Cup podium of his career, tying him with Steve Podborski as Canada's all-time leader. A week later he took third at Bormio to take the career lead. This boosted Guay's hopes of achieving his dream of winning an Olympic medal. Going into Sochi, Guay stated, "I won't be satisfied if I don't walk away with a medal." An injury though threatened his ability to perform at his peak after suffering a slight meniscus tear earlier in January. He finished tenth in the downhill and missed a late gate in the super-G and was disqualified. The following week, he won a downhill at Kvitfjell, Norway. Guay missed all of the 2015 season recovering from his sixth knee surgery.

At the 2017 World Championships in St. Moritz, Guay won the super-G event. At 35, Guay became the oldest World Champion ever, replacing incumbent super-G champion Hannes Reichelt. That weekend, Guay also placed second in the downhill event.

Guay was unable to participate in the alpine skiing events at the 2018 Winter Olympics in Pyeongchang because of a back injury.

Hours before Guay was supposed to compete at Lake Louise in November 2018, he decided to retire from the sport after his teammate Manuel Osborne-Paradis suffered a violent crash. He had already planned to retire after the end of the season but hastened his departure after hearing that Osborne-Paradis had needed an emergency airlift.

== Personal life ==
Guay and his wife Karen have four daughters and they live in Mont-Tremblant.

He is of Norwegian descent through one grandmother. Since 2009, Erik Guay has been part of the Tremblant athletes ambassadors program.

== World Cup results ==
=== Season titles ===
Season	Discipline
2010	Super-G

=== Season standings ===
Season	Age	Overall	Slalom	Giant slalom	Super-G	Downhill	Combined
2003	21	79	—	—	32	37	—
2004	22	55	—	—	24	28	—
2005	23	25	—	—	15	14	19
2006	24	18	—	47	6	11	—
2007	25	12	—	49	10	3	—
2008	26	18	—	41	6	12	—
2009	27	22	—	—	12	6	—
2010	28	13	—	—	1	13	—
2011	29	26	—	—	13	14	—
2012	30	19	—	—	12	7	—
2013	31	18	—	—	11	6	—
2014	32	13	—	—	21	3	—
2015	33	injured, out for season					
2016	34	26	—	—	20	13	—
2017	35	14	—	—	9	5	—
2018	36	116	—	—	36	—	—

=== Race podiums ===
- 5 wins – (3 DH, 2 SG)
- 24 podiums – (17 DH, 7 SG)

Season	Date	Location	Discipline	Place
2004	29 Nov 2003	Lake Louise, Canada	Downhill	2nd
2006	1 Dec 2005	(United States) Beaver Creek, USA	Super-G	2nd
2006	16 Dec 2005	Val Gardena, Italy	Super-G	2nd
2006	17 Dec 2005	Val Gardena, Italy	Downhill	3rd
2007	20 Jan 2007	Val d'Isère, France	Downhill	2nd
2007	23 Feb 2007	Garmisch, Germany	Downhill	3rd
2007	24 Feb 2007	Garmisch, Germany	Downhill	1st
2007	10 Mar 2007	Kvitfjell, Norway	Downhill	2nd
2007	15 Mar 2007	Lenzerheide, Switzerland	Super-G	3rd
2009	5 Dec 2008	(United States) Beaver Creek, USA	Downhill	3rd
2010	7 Mar 2010	Kvitfjell, Norway	Super-G	1st
2010	10 Mar 2010	Garmisch, Germany	Downhill	3rd
2010	11 Mar 2010	Garmisch, Germany	Super-G	1st
2011	17 Dec 2010	Val Gardena, Italy	Super-G	3rd
2011	11 Mar 2011	Kvitfjell, Norway	Downhill	2nd
2012	28 Jan 2012	Garmisch, Germany	Downhill	2nd
2012	4 Feb 2012	Chamonix, France	Downhill	3rd
2013	15 Dec 2012	Val Gardena, Italy	Downhill	3rd
2013	26 Jan 2013	Kitzbühel, Austria	Downhill	2nd
2014	21 Dec 2013	Val Gardena, Italy	Downhill	1st
2014	29 Dec 2013	Bormio, Italy	Downhill	3rd
2014	1 Mar 2014	Kvitfjell, Norway	Downhill	1st
2016	16 Mar 2016	St. Moritz, Switzerland	Downhill	3rd
2017	16 Dec 2016	Val Gardena, Italy	Super-G	3rd

== World Championship results ==
Year	Age	Slalom	Giant slalom	Super-G	Downhill	Combined
2003	21	—	—	6	6	17
2005	23	—	—	19	22	DNS
2007	25	—	—	6	4	—
2009	27	—	—	19	DNF	—
2011	29	—	—	DNF	1	—
2013	31	—	—	23	DSQ	—
2015	33	injured, out for season				
2017	35	—	—	1	2	—
