= Therese Borssén =

Swedish alpine skier

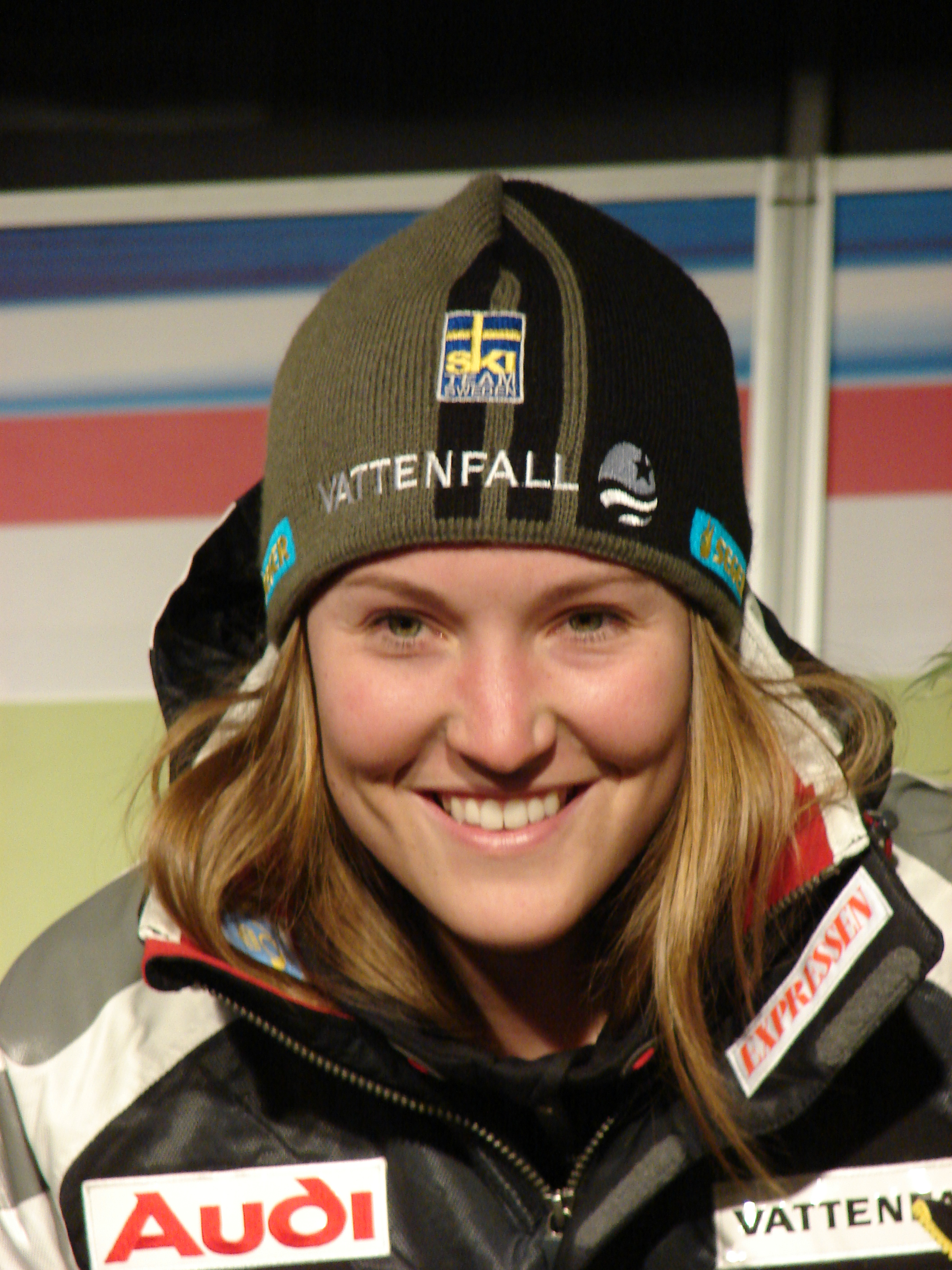
- Therese Borssén during World Cup competitions in Semmering, Austria in December 2006.

Personal information
- Nationality: Sweden
- Born: 12 December 1984 (age 41) Rättvik, Sweden

Sport
- Sport: Skiing

Therese Borssén (born 12 December 1984 in Rättvik) is a Swedish former skier specialized in slalom. Her first World Cup win came in Semmering, on 29 December 2006. She resides in Rättvik and Stockholm.

Therese participated in the 2006 Winter Olympics in Torino and finished 8th in slalom. She also won the Readers' Handbook Award.

On 30 January 2013, she announced her retirement following the 2012–2013 season.

== World Cup competition victories ==
Date	Location	Race type
29 December 2006	Semmering, Austria	Slalom
