= Marc Berthod =

Swiss alpine skier (born 1983)

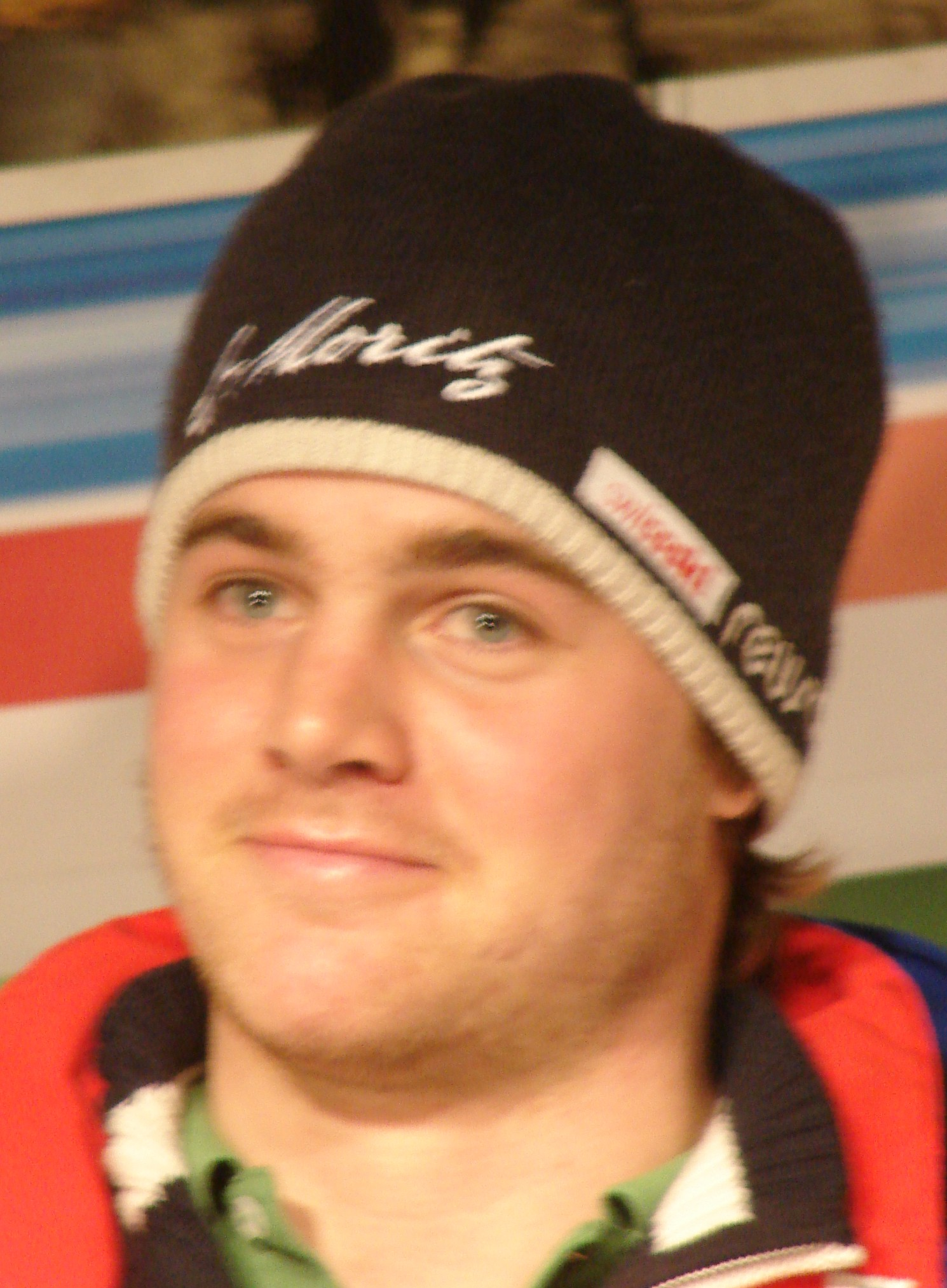
- Marc Berthod

Personal information
- Born: 24 November 1983 (age 42) St. Moritz, Switzerland

Skiing career
- Sport: Alpine skiing
- Club: Alpina St. Moritz
- Retired: September 2016
- Disciplines: Giant slalom, slalom, combined, super-G, downhill
- World Cup debut: 30 November 2006

Olympics
- Teams: 2 – (2006, 2010)
- Medals: 0

World Championships
- Teams: 6 – (2003–13)
- Medals: 0

World Cup
- Seasons: 10th (2005–2014)
- Wins: 2 – (1 SL, 1 GS)
- Podiums: 5 – (1 SL, 2 GS, 2 AC)
- Overall titles: 0 – (8 in 2007)
- Discipline titles: 0 – (2 in AC, 2007)
Medal record
Men's alpine skiing
Representing Switzerland
World Championships
Bronze medal – third place	2007 Åre	Combined
Bronze medal – third place	2007 Åre	Team event
Junior World Ski Championships
Gold medal – first place	2003 Briançonnais	Slalom
Silver medal – second place	2002 Tarvisio	Slalom
Bronze medal – third place	2003 Briançonnais	Downhill

Marc Berthod (born 24 November 1983 in Saint-Moritz) is a retired Swiss alpine skier.

In 2005, he was Swiss champion in giant slalom. He finished 7th in the combined event at the 2006 Winter Olympics. On 7 January 2007, Berthod won the world cup slalom in Adelboden in a "miraculous" effort that saw him qualify in 27th position for the second run (an impressive performance in itself as he started at #60) and then proceeded to win with a second run that carried him all the way into 1st place, beating Olympic champion Benjamin Raich by 0.26 seconds. The 2007 season has also yielded other good results for Berthod, with two other podium finishes so far, with a 2nd place at the Beaver Creek alpine combined, and a 2nd place in Wengen also in the combined.

In September 2016 he declared his retirement, as he lacked motivation and suffered several injuries in the past.

== Race podiums ==
- 2 wins – (1 SL, 1 GS)
- 5 podiums – (1 SL, 2 GS, 2 AC)

Season	Date	Location	Discipline	Place
2007	31 Nov 2006	Beaver Creek, United States	Super combined	2nd
2007	7 Jan 2007	Adelboden, Switzerland	Slalom	1st
2007	14 Jan 2007	Wengen, Switzerland	Super combined	2nd
2008	30 Dec 2006	Alta Badia, Italy	Giant slalom	3rd
2008	05 Jan 2008	Adelboden, Switzerland	Giant slalom	1st

=== Season standings ===
Season	Age	Overall	Slalom	Giant slalom	Super-G	Downhill	Combined
2005	21	97	—	35	—	—	—
2006	22	71	43	34	—	—	32
2007	23	8	6	22	36	—	2
2008	24	21	21	7	43	—	36
2009	25	62	—	21	37	54	—
2010	26	63	37	17	—	—	—
2011	27	61	53	18	—	—	33
2012	28	106	55	35	—	—	—
2013	29	89	—	43	—	—	13
2014	30	112	—	—	—	50	27
2015	31	122	—	—	51	52	—
