= Kai Horwitz =

Chilean alpine skier

Personal information
- Born: 9 April 1998 (age 28) Santiago, Chile
- Height: 174 cm (5 ft 9 in)
- Weight: 82 kg (181 lb)

Sport
- Sport: Alpine skiing
- College team: Universidad de los Andes
- Club: Club Andes

Kai Horwitz (born 9 April 1998) is a Chilean Olympic alpine skier.

== Early and personal life ==
Horwitz was born in Santiago, Chile, and is Jewish. His sister Nadja Horwitz represented Chile in sailing at the 2016 Summer Olympics in Rio de Janeiro, in the women's 470 class. His cousins Henrik von Appen and Sven von Appen represented Chile in alpine skiing at the 2017 World Championships in St. Moritz, Switzerland, and Henrik competed for Chile at the 2014 Winter Olympics and 2018 Winter Olympics in all five alpine skiing events. In 2018, Henrik was also Chile's flagbearer at the opening ceremony.

Horwitz studied at Burke Mountain Academy in East Burke, Vermont, from 2012 to 2016. He is studying biokinetics at the University of the Andes in Santiago.

Kai stated that sports was always a favorite topic in their very united family, and "we are always finding good ideas."

== Ski career ==
Horwitz's specialties in alpine skiing are alpine combined, downhill, giant slalom, slalom, and super-G. His club is Club Andes in La Parva, Chile. His coach is Luciano Acerboni.

He won the giant slalom at the 2011 Whistler Cup in British Columbia, Canada. At the February 2016 Winter Youth Olympics in Lillehammer, Norway, Horwitz came in 20th in the Alpine Combined. In March 2016 he won the FIS - Giant Slalom at Stowe Mountain Resort, and in August 2016 he came in third at the South American Cup - Antillanca in Slalom. In January 2017, he came in third at the Italian National Junior Race in Giant Slalom at Pozza di Fassa, and in September 2017 he came in third at the South American Cup - Chapelco in Men's Giant Slalom.

Horwitz competed in the 2018 Winter Olympics at the age of 19. He did not finish in the Men's Giant Slalom and Men's Slalom.
