= Yannick Bertrand =

French alpine skier (born 1980)

Yannick Bertrand (born 18 August 1980 in Thonon-les-Bains) is a French alpine skier who competed in the 2006 Winter Olympics. He placed 24th in both the men's Downhill and Super-G events.

During a 2007 FIS Alpine Ski World Cup Super-G race, Bertrand injured his groin by colliding with a gate. The NBC Sports commentary of the incident has repeatedly resurfaced during the Winter Olympics.

== Career results ==
=== Winter Olympics ===
Year
Year	Super-G	Downhill
2006	24	24

=== World Championships ===
Year
Year	Super-G	Downhill
2005	DNF1	29
2007	—N/a	18
2011	DNS1	29
