= Tilen Debelak =

Slovenian alpine skier (born 1991)

Tilen Debelak (born 31 May 1991) is a Slovenian alpine ski racer.
