= Walter Girardi =

Italian alpine skier (born 1976)

Walter Girardi (born in Schio, 16 April 1976) is a former Italian Alpine skier. He currently lives in Villafranca di Verona. 183 cm tall and weighing 85 kg, he was registered with the Sports Group Finanza.

Girardi was the Italian national champion, in the downhill, in 2006 and 2007. He announced his retirement from the sport in June 2009.

== World Cup ==
His début in the World Cup was on 5 January 1997 in the giant slalom in Kranjska Gora. Girardi competed in many subsequent events.

== European Cup ==
Girardi has four wins in the European Cup: the Giant Slalom of Gällivare in 1999, Super Giant of Megève and Sella Nevea in 2005, and the downhill in Saalbach in 2006. In the season 2004–05 he won the speciality cup in the Super G, finishing third overall in the final ranking.
