= Ioan Valeriu Achiriloaie =

Romanian alpine skier (born 1990)

Personal information
- Born: 20 August 1990 (age 35) Braşov, Romania
- Height: 1.83 m (6 ft 0 in) (6' 0'')
- Weight: 87 kg / 192 lb
Medal record
Alpine skiing
Representing Romania

Ioan Valeriu Achiriloaie (born 20 August 1990 in Braşov, Romania) is an alpine skier from Romania. He competed for Romania at the 2014 Winter Olympics in the alpine skiing events.
