= John Kucera =

Canadian alpine skier

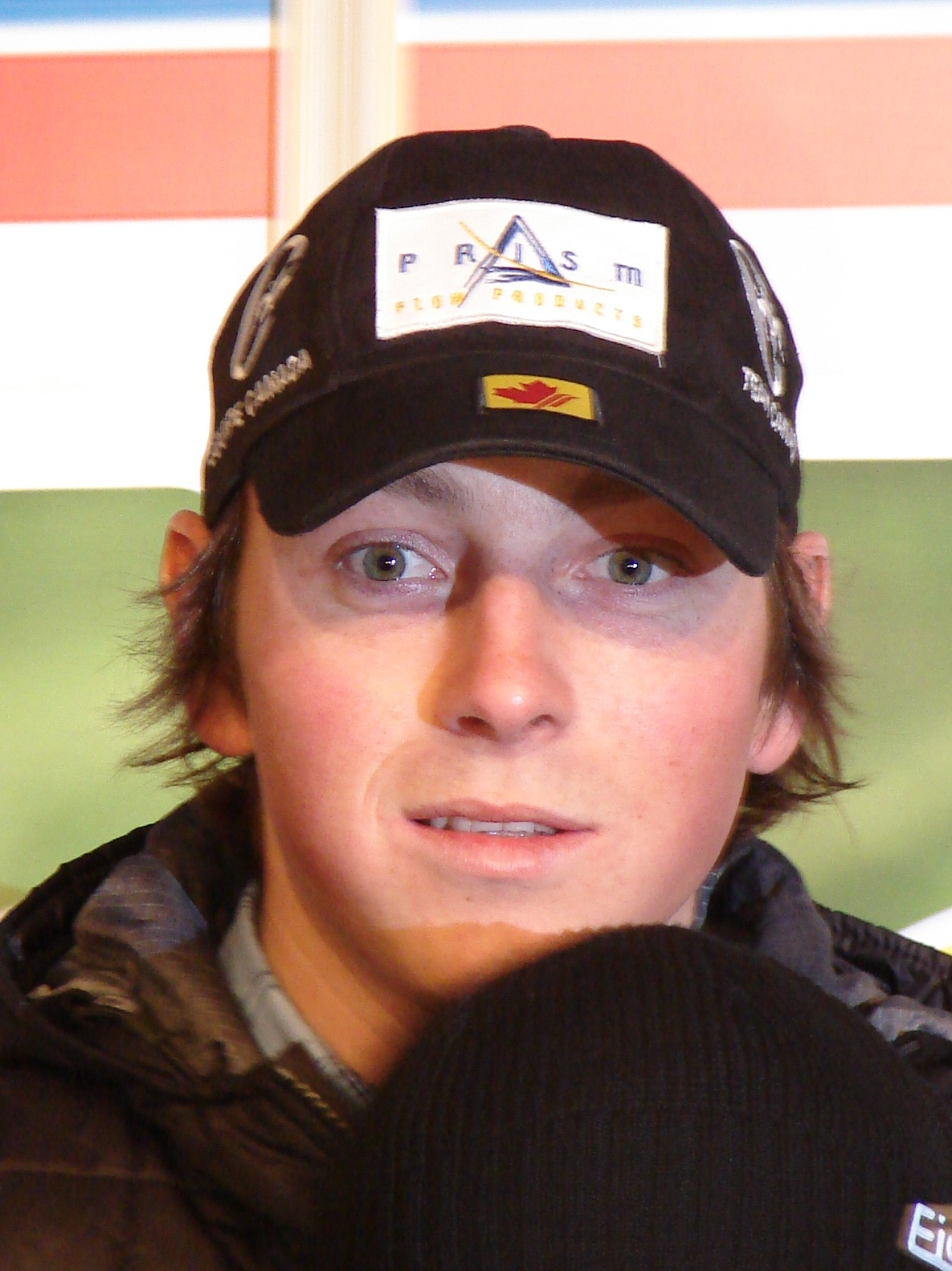
- Kucera in December 2006

Personal information
- Born: September 17, 1984 (age 42) Calgary, Alberta, Canada
- Height: 173 cm (5 ft 8 in)

Skiing career
- Sport: Alpine skiing
- Club: Calgary Alpine Racing
- Disciplines: Downhill, super-G, giant slalom, combined
- World Cup debut: November 27, 2004 (age 20)

Olympics
- Teams: 1 – (2006)
- Medals: 0

World Championships
- Teams: 3 – (2005, 2007, 2009)
- Medals: 1 (1 gold)

World Cup
- Seasons: 6 – (2005–10)
- Wins: 1 – (1 SG)
- Podiums: 3 – (3 SG)
- Overall titles: 0 – (13th – 2008)
- Discipline titles: 0 – (3rd in SG, 2007)
Medal record
Men's alpine skiing
Representing Canada
World Championships
| Gold medal – first place | 2009 Val-d'Isère | Downhill |

John Kucera (born September 17, 1984) is a retired World Cup alpine ski racer from Canada.

Born in Calgary, Alberta, he raced in all five alpine disciplines, focusing on the speed events of downhill and super-G. Kucera is a former world champion in the downhill. His parents immigrated to Canada from Czechoslovakia in 1980.

Kucera made his World Cup debut at age 20 in November 2004, on home snow in Lake Louise, Alberta. Two years later, Lake Louise was the site of his first World Cup victory, a super-G race in November 2006. Three weeks later he made another World Cup podium with a third-place finish in the super-G at Val Gardena, Italy. His next podium came two years later, a second place in the super-G at Lake Louise.

He won the gold medal in the downhill at the 2009 World Championships at Val-d'Isère, France, to become the first Canadian man to win the event at the World Championships.

On November 28, 2009, Kucera finished sixth in the first downhill of the 2010 season at Lake Louise, but fractured his left leg in the super-G the following day. A compound fracture through his left calf, causing him to miss the rest of the 2010 World Cup season and the 2010 Winter Olympics at Whistler.

Kucera returned to the snow a year later in late 2010. As part of his recovery, he was a forerunner for a number of races in North America and Europe. He retired from competition at the end of the 2013-14 World Cup season. As the son of Czech immigrants, Kucera is fluent in Czech. His surname is pronounced kuw-cze-rah.

== World Cup results ==
=== Season standings ===
| Season | Age | Overall | Slalom | Giant slalom | Super-G | Downhill | Combined |
|---|---|---|---|---|---|---|---|
| 2005 | 20 | 100 | — | — | 51 | 52 | 12 |
| 2006 | 21 | 81 | — | — | 37 | 49 | 24 |
| 2007 | 22 | 23 | — | 15 | 3 | 38 | 22 |
| 2008 | 23 | 13 | — | 10 | 12 | 17 | 31 |
| 2009 | 24 | 24 | — | 50 | 9 | 19 | 13 |
| 2010 | 25 | 99 | — | — | — | 34 | — |
| 2011 | 26 | | | | | | |
| 2012 | 27 | | | | | | |
| 2013 | 28 | 113 | — | — | 36 | — | — |

=== Race podiums ===
- 1 win – (1 SG)
- 3 podiums – (3 SG)

| Season | Date | Location | Discipline | Place |
|---|---|---|---|---|
| 2007 | Nov 26, 2006 | Lake Louise, Canada | Super-G | 1st |
| 2007 | Dec 15, 2006 | Val Gardena, Italy | Super-G | 3rd |
| 2009 | Nov 30, 2008 | Lake Louise, Canada | Super-G | 2nd |

== World Championship results ==
| Year | Age | Slalom | Giant slalom | Super-G | Downhill | Combined |
|---|---|---|---|---|---|---|
| 2005 | 20 | — | — | 25 | 16 | 9 |
| 2007 | 22 | — | 12 | 30 | 31 | 32 |
| 2009 | 24 | — | 44 | 6 | 1 | DNS2 |

== Olympic results ==
| Year | Age | Slalom | Giant slalom | Super-G | Downhill | Combined |
|---|---|---|---|---|---|---|
| 2006 | 21 | — | — | 22 | 27 | 17 |
