= Mario Scheiber =

Austrian alpine skier

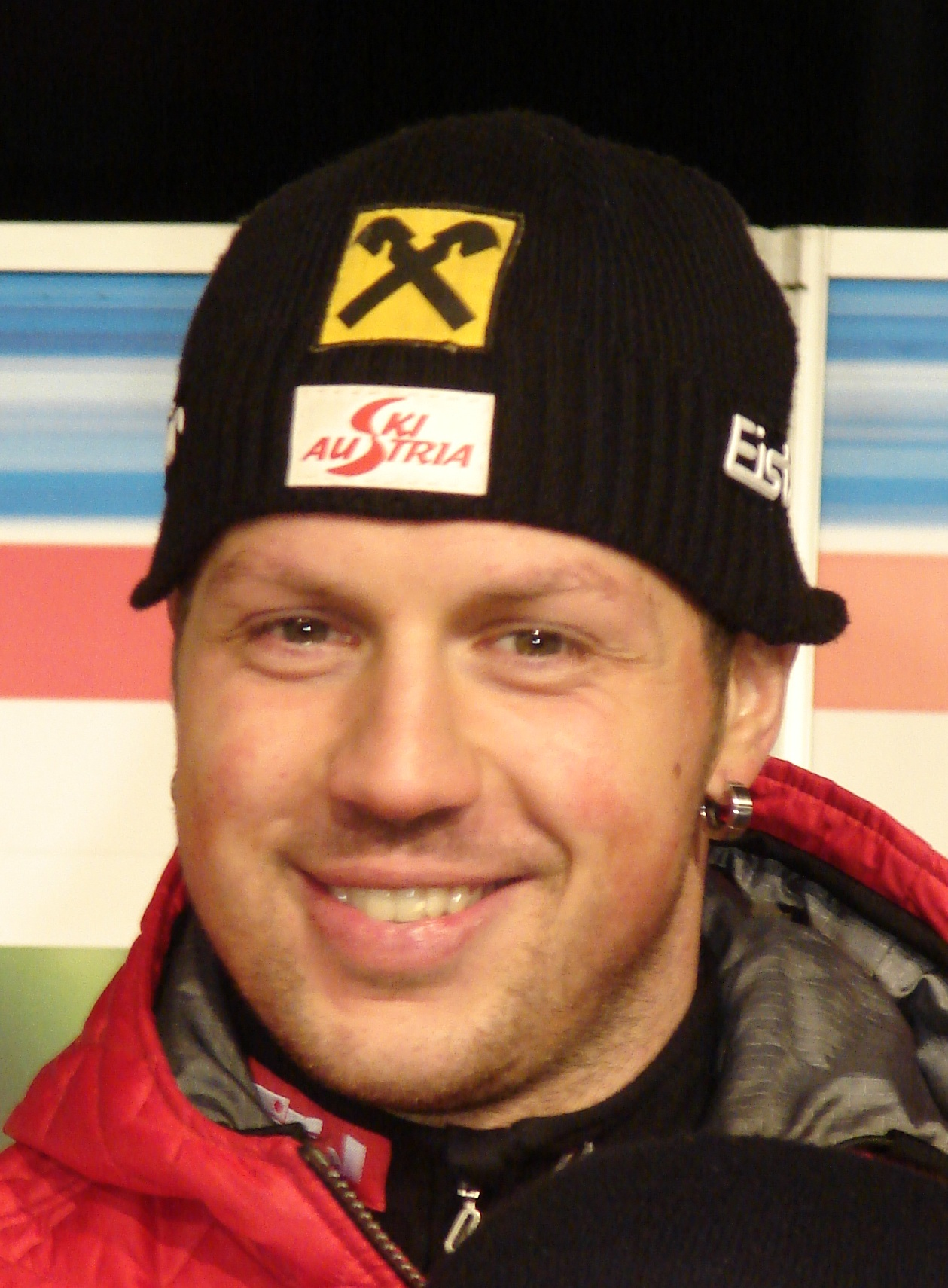

Personal information
- Born: March 6, 1983 (age 43) Sankt Jakob in Defereggen, Austria
- Height: 1.76 m (5 ft 9 in)
- Website: www.mario-scheiber.at

Skiing career
- Sport: Alpine skiing
- Club: WSV Sankt Jakob in Defereggen
- Retired: March 12, 2012
- Disciplines: DH, SG, GS, combined
- World Cup debut: March 15, 2003

Olympics
- Teams: 0
- Medals: 0 (0 gold)

World Championships
- Teams: 1 (2007)
- Medals: 0 (0 gold)

World Cup
- Seasons: 4
- Wins: 0
- Podiums: 7
- Overall titles: 0
- Discipline titles: 0

Mario Scheiber (born March 6, 1983) is an Austrian former skier who competed in all World Cup disciplines apart from slalom. He first started in a World Cup race on March 15, 2003, in Lillehammer. However, it was not until the 2004–05 season that he would start again in the World Cup, this time on a regular basis, finishing second twice and third once. In the 2005–06 season he participated in only one race because of a training injury. However, he had a successful comeback in the 2006–07 season, finishing in podium positions several times.

== Biography ==
Scheiber lives in St. Jakob in Defereggen and graduated from the ski high school in Stams. Very early he joined the ski club of his hometown and soon he was accepted into the squad of the Tyrolean Ski Association. As a 15-year-old, he competed in his first FIS races in November 1998. Scheiber turned into a good all-rounder. In 2000, he became three-time Austrian youth champion in his age group (downhill, super-G and slalom) and was subsequently accepted into the junior squad of the Austrian Ski Association (ÖSV). In January 2001, he made his first appearance in the European Cup at the races in Altenmarkt-Zauchensee, but was still far from scoring points. Three weeks later he finished twelfth in the slalom at the 2001 Junior World Championships. After further European Cup races without points in January and February 2002, Scheiber won the silver medal in the downhill at the Junior World Championships in 2002 and thus made it into the B squad of the ÖSV.

In the 2002/03 season, Scheiber already achieved several top 10 placements in the European Cup. On February 19, he stood on the podium for the first time with third place in the downhill of Tarvisio. Shortly afterwards, he won the gold medal in the giant slalom and bronze in the super-G at the 2003 Junior World Championships, at the same time as the Swiss Daniel Albrecht. As junior world champion he was first allowed to start in the world cup at the season finale in Hajfell, though he dropped out in the second round of giant slalom. Scheiber became Austrian champion in super-G in March 2003 and after that winter was promoted to the A-squad of the Austrian ski organization. On December 18, 2003, he claimed his first win in the European cup at the downhill of the Tonale Pass and by getting to the podium three more times in the 2003–04 season he came in fifth in the overall standings and third in each of the downhill and super-G rankings, which guaranteed him a spot in those disciplines for the world cup in the upcoming winter.

In his third world cup race in the 2004–05 season Scheiber was already able to claim the third spot on the podium in the super-G of Beaver Creek. In February and March, he continued his run with two second places in the downhills of Garmisch-Patenkirchen and Kvitjfell. At the end of that winter he ended up placing himself in the top ten of the downhill as well as the super-G world cup. After the glacier kick-off in Sölden at the start of the 2005–06 season, Scheiber got badly injured in the giant slalom training in Sun Peak on November 13, 2005. He suffered a cruciate ligament rupture in his right knee and had to pause for the rest of that winter. In his second world cup race, in the 2006–07 season in the super-G of Lake Louis, Scheiber already claimed a spot on the podium again. In December he reached two third places in the two downhill races of Bormio and in March he was again second in the super-G of Kvitfjell. He also achieved top 10 results in giant slalom and super combination, which earned him ninth place in the overall world cup and downhill world cup, and fourth place in the super-G world cup. As a possible medal candidate, however, he came away empty-handed at the 2007 World Championships in Are after eighth place in downhill and eleventh place in super-G. In the 2007–08 world cup season Scheiber achieved three podium places: He finished second in the super-G of Beaver Creek and second in the downhill of Kitzbühel and third in the super-G of Kitzbühel. However, on March 6, 2008, his 25th birthday, he seriously injured his left shoulder during his giant slalom training in Maria Alm. After an operation he had to end the season early. Due to another injury, the following 2008–09 season was already over for Scheiber after only three races: On November 30, 2008, he suffered a cartilage and meniscus damage in his knee in the super-G of Lake Louise without a fall and was unable to participate in any further races due to persistent pain for the rest of the winter.
