= Christoph Gruber =

Austrian alpine skier (born 1976)

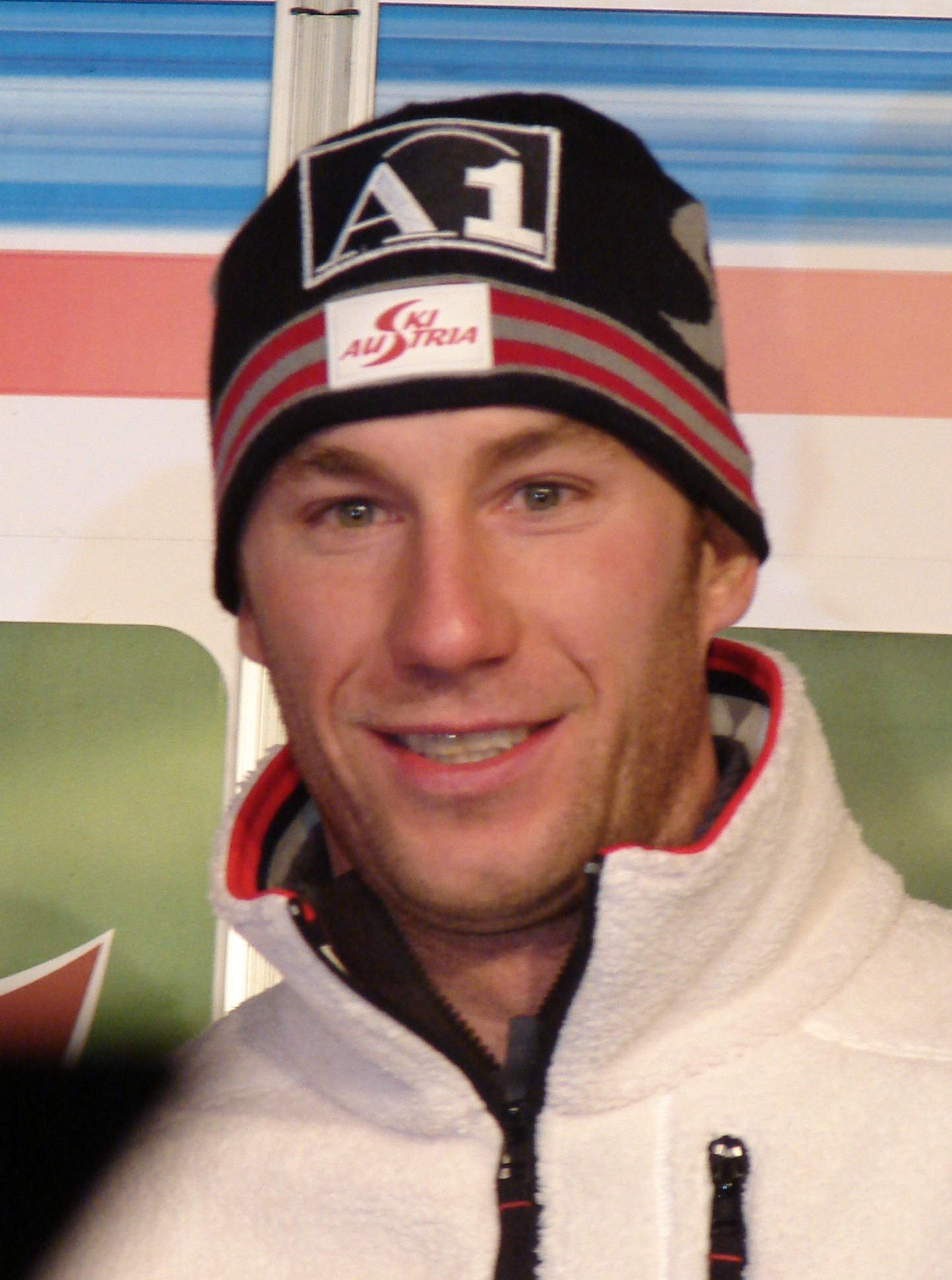

Personal information
- Born: 25 March 1976 (age 50) Schwaz, Austria
- Height: 1.82 m (6 ft 0 in)
- Website: http://www.christophgruber.at

Skiing career
- Sport: Alpine skiing
- Club: Turnerschaft Schwaz
- Disciplines: Downhill, super-G, giant slalom, combined
- World Cup debut: 27 November 1998

Olympics
- Teams: 2 – (2002, 2006)
- Medals: 0 (0 gold)

World Championships
- Teams: 4 – (2001, 2003, 2005, 2007)
- Medals: 0 (0 gold)

World Cup
- Seasons: 10
- Wins: 5
- Podiums: 14
- Overall titles: 0
- Discipline titles: 0

Christoph Gruber (born 25 March 1976 in Schwaz) is an Austrian former alpine skier competing in all World Cup disciplines except slalom. In his World Cup debut, the super-G in Aspen, Colorado, on 27 November 1998, he finished in fourteenth position. On 21 December 2000, he won his first World Cup race, a giant slalom, in Bormio. He won the super-G in Garmisch-Partenkirchen three times.

== World Cup victories ==
Date	Location	Race
21 December 2000	(Italy) Bormio	Giant slalom
28 January 2001	(Germany) Garmisch-Partenkirchen	Super-G
20 February 2005	(Germany) Garmisch-Partenkirchen	Super-G
29 January 2006	(Germany) Garmisch-Partenkirchen	Super-G
22 February 2008	(Canada) Whistler	Super-G
