= Alexander Köll =

Swedish alpine skier (born 1990)

Personal information
- Born: 2 December 1990 (age 35) Landskrona, Sweden

Skiing career
- Sport: Alpine skiing
- Disciplines: Technical events
- World Cup debut: 2015

World Championships
- Teams: 2
- Medals: 0

World Cup
- Seasons: 7
- Podiums: 0

Alexander Köll (born 2 December 1990) is a Swedish former World Cup alpine ski racer who competed in two editions (2017 and 2019) of the FIS Alpine World Ski Championships.

== Career ==
Alexander Köll has competed for Sweden since 2009. Since 2015, he has competed in every season of the World Cup.

On 10 December 2020, he was badly hurt when crashing during practice in Val d'Isere.

On 25 July 2022, he announced his retirement from alpine skiing following the 2021–2022 season.

== World Championships results ==
Year
Year	Downhill	Super-G	Giant slalom	Slalom	Combined
2017	35	30	-	-	DNS
2019	46	20	-	-	21
