= 2002 Alpine Skiing World Cup – Men's slalom =

2002 Men's slalom World Cup
Previous: 2001	Next: 2003

Men's slalom World Cup 2001/2002

== Final point standings ==
In men's slalom World Cup 2001/02 all results count.

Place	Name	Country	Total points	2 (United States)	3 (United States)	7 (Italy)	13 (Slovenia)	17 (Switzerland)	19 (Switzerland)	23 (Austria)	25 (Austria)	34 (Austria)
1	Ivica Kostelić	Croatia	611	100	45	26	60	80	100	40	60	100
2	Bode Miller	United States	560	-	80	100	-	100	40	60	100	80
3	Jean-Pierre Vidal	France	456	29	60	50	100	-	45	32	80	60
4	Mitja Kunc	Slovenia	322	20	-	-	50	60	80	26	50	36
5	Rainer Schönfelder	Austria	318	12	50	6	10	40	50	100	50	-
6	Kalle Palander	Finland	287	32	22	45	32	50	32	18	32	24
7	Giorgio Rocca	Italy	286	80	-	80	40	-	36	50	-	-
8	Mario Matt	Austria	267	60	100	11	80	16	-	-	-	-
9	Kjetil André Aamodt	Norway	232	50	13	36	24	10	32	12	29	26
10	Kilian Albrecht	Austria	202	14	14	-	8	-	-	80	36	50
11	Tom Stiansen	Norway	187	-	36	60	26	45	-	20	-	-
12	Sébastien Amiez	France	177	12	11	12	22	26	8	29	12	45
13	Jure Košir	Slovenia	166	45	20	5	-	32	-	11	24	29
14	Drago Grubelnik	Slovenia	144	-	16	32	-	15	5	36	40	-
15	Manfred Pranger	Austria	140	-	4	15	40	36	-	45	-	-
16	Pierrick Bourgeat	France	133	-	24	22	45	-	-	16	26	-
17	Markus Larsson	Sweden	13	10	6	29	-	-	20	22	13	32
18	Lasse Kjus	Norway	101	40	32	-	11	-	-	-	-	18
19	Benjamin Raich	Austria	97	-	-	40	-	-	7	10	-	40
20	Truls Ove Karlsen	Norway	84	-	32	9	12	9	-	-	-	22
21	Harald Christian Strand Nilsen	Norway	79	9	12	10	20	-	-	-	8	20
22	Markus Eberle	Germany	71	24	9	-	-	24	-	-	14	-
23	Ole Kristian Furuseth	Norway	69	-	-	14	15	20	-	-	20	-
24	Jean-Philippe Roy	Canada	68	-	10	-	29	29	-	-	-	-
25	Rene Mlekuž	Slovenia	66	13	26	-	2	-	16	-	9	-
26	Edoardo Zardini	Italy	60	-	-	-	-	-	60	-	-	-
27	Erik Schlopy	United States	58	6	-	7	14	-	24	-	7	-
28	Alain Baxter	United Kingdom	54	16	-	-	4	6	15	13	-	-
29	Michael von Grünigen	Switzerland	54	36	18	-	-	-	-	-	-	-
	Urs Imboden	Switzerland	54	-	3	-	16	-	13	-	22	-
	Markus Ganahl	Liechtenstein	54	-	-	20	18	-	-	-	16	-
32	Heinz Schilchegger	Austria	48	8	40	-	-	-	-	-	-	-
33	Giancarlo Bergamelli	Italy	46	-	-	-	9	-	20	6	11	-
34	Stéphane Tissot	France	44	-	-	24	13	-	-	7	-	-
35	Kentaro Minagawa	Japan	43	15	-	-	7	3	-	-	18	-
36	Marco Casanova	Switzerland	41	22	-	-	1	8	10	-	-	-
37	Chip Knight	United States	38	-	-	-	-	14	14	-	10	-
38	Thomas Grandi	Canada	37	-	-	-	-	11	26	-	-	-
	Angelo Weiss	Italy	37	-	7	8	-	-	22	-	-	-
40	Mitja Dragšič	Slovenia	36	-	-	-	-	22	-	14	-	-
	Tom Rothrock	United States	36	-	-	-	-	-	6	15	15	-
42	Casey Puckett	United States	34	18	-	16	-	-	-	-	-	-
43	Gaetan Llorach	France	33	-	15	15	-	-	-	-	-	-
	Andrzej Bachleda	Poland	33	-	-	1	-	20	12	-	-	-
45	Alan Perathoner	Italy	26	26	-	-	-	-	-	-	-	-
	Martin Marinac	Austria	26	-	-	-	-	-	-	26	-	-
47	Florian Seer	Austria	23	-	5	-	5	13	-	-	-	-
48	Sacha Gros	United States	17	-	-	-	6	-	11	-	-	-
	Stanley Hayer	Czech Republic	17	-	-	-	-	8	9	-	-	-
50	Mitja Valenčič	Slovenia	16	-	-	3	-	13	-	-	-	-
	Steven Nyman	United States	16	-	-	-	-	-	-	-	-	16
52	Daniel Défago	Switzerland	14	-	-	-	-	-	-	8	6	-
53	Alois Vogl	Germany	13	-	-	13	-	-	-	-	-	-
54	Pierre Egger	Austria	12	-	-	-	3	-	-	9	-	-
55	Thomas Sykora	Austria	8	-	8	-	-	-	-	-	-	-
56	Matjaž Vrhovnik	Slovenia	7	7	-	-	-	-	-	-	-	-
	Mika Marila	Finland	7	-	-	2	-	-	-	-	5	-
58	Alexandre Anselmet	France	5	-	-	-	-	5	-	-	-	-
59	Davide Simoncelli	Italy	4	-	-	4	-	-	-	-	-	-
	Thomas Geisser	Switzerland	4	-	-	-	-	4	-	-	-	-

Note:

In the last race only the best racers were allowed to compete and only the best 15 finishers were awarded with points.

Alpine Skiing World Cup
Men

Overall | Downhill | Super G | Giant slalom | Slalom | Combined

2002
