= 2003 Alpine Skiing World Cup – Men's slalom =

Men's slalom World Cup 2002/2003

== Final point standings ==
In men's slalom World Cup 2002/03 the all results count. Race No. 10 at Sestriere was a K.O.-Slalom.

Place	Name	Country	Total points	3 (United States)	10 (Italy)	16 (Slovenia)	18 (Italy)	22 (Switzerland)	25 (Austria)	28 (Austria)	32 (South Korea)	33 (Japan)	37 (Norway)
1	Kalle Palander	Finland	658	11	22	50	45	50	100	100	100	100	80
2	Ivica Kostelić	Croatia	580	18	100	100	100	60	50	50	16	50	36
3	Rainer Schönfelder	Austria	473	100	-	80	36	18	80	6	8	100	45
4	Giorgio Rocca	Italy	438	13	80	-	-	100	-	5	80	60	100
5	Manfred Pranger	Austria	385	50	26	45	50	32	-	45	32	45	60
6	Benjamin Raich	Austria	367	60	10	40	40	-	45	80	60	-	32
7	Hans Petter Buraas	Norway	280	-	50	32	60	45	-	60	15	18	-
8	Truls Ove Karlsen	Norway	263	45	60	-	20	24	32	24	-	29	29
9	Pierrick Bourgeat	France	224	80	2	-	-	6	18	18	20	26	24
10	Jean-Pierre Vidal	France	200	40	45	60	-	40	-	-	-	15	-
11	Heinz Schilchegger	Austria	194	26	32	-	12	20	60	-	14	14	16
12	Giancarlo Bergamelli	Italy	191	-	-	36	18	12	16	36	29	22	22
13	Kilian Albrecht	Austria	170	32	18	-	22	13	26	14	45	-	-
14	Tom Stiansen	Norway	169	7	24	8	29	-	-	12	7	32	50
15	Akira Sasaki	Japan	166	-	-	-	-	80	-	32	14	40	-
16	Thomas Grandi	Canada	154	16	-	29	-	15	-	22	36	16	20
17	Bode Miller	United States	144	-	-	-	80	24	-	-	40	-	-
18	Silvan Zurbriggen	Switzerland	137	20	-	20	-	-	36	10	-	11	40
19	Chip Knight	United States	130	36	40	8	13	14	11	8	-	-	-
20	Erik Schlopy	United States	125	4	-	-	24	29	6	13	-	20	29
21	Martin Marinac	Austria	110	22	-	-	-	10	10	40	10	-	18
22	Mitja Dragšič	Slovenia	105	29	-	-	32	-	8	-	-	36	-
23	Kjetil André Aamodt	Norway	99	12	4	6	26	36	-	15	-	-	-
24	Sébastien Amiez	France	97	5	8	13	16	-	29	20	-	6	-
25	Mitja Kunc	Slovenia	88	-	11	-	-	-	40	11	26	-	-
26	Markus Larsson	Sweden	85	15	12	12	-	-	20	16	-	10	-
27	Harald C. Strand Nilsen	Norway	79	8	36	12	14	-	-	9	-	-	-
28	Johan Brolenius	Sweden	73	-	5	15	-	-	24	29	-	-	-
29	Drago Grubelnik	Slovenia	71	24	-	14	-	-	7	26	-	-	-
	Tom Rothrock	United States	71	10	7	22	-	-	12	-	20	-	-
31	Urs Imboden	Switzerland	56	6	-	18	-	-	-	-	24	8	-
32	Rene Mlekuž	Slovenia	54	14	15	-	-	-	-	7	18	-	-
33	Markus Eberle	Germany	52	-	6	10	15	-	-	-	9	12	-
34	Florian Seer	Austria	50	10	16	24	-	-	-	-	-	-	-
35	Mario Matt	Austria	46	-	-	18	-	-	16	-	12	-	-
36	Alain Baxter	United Kingdom	42	-	-	-	-	18	-	-	-	24	-
37	Kurt Engl	Austria	35	-	-	-	-	-	22	-	-	13	-
38	Aksel Lund Svindal	Norway	33	-	-	-	11	-	-	-	22	-	-
39	Kévin Page	France	29	-	29	-	-	-	-	-	-	-	-
40	Michael Walchhofer	Austria	26	-	-	26	-	-	-	-	-	-	-
	Julien Cousineau	Canada	26	-	-	-	-	26	-	-	-	-	-
42	Markus Ganahl	Liechtenstein	21	-	10	4	-	7	-	-	-	-	-
43	Reinfried Herbst	Austria	20	-	20	-	-	-	-	-	-	-	-
44	Andreas Nilsen	Norway	14	-	14	-	-	-	-	-	-	-	-
	Lasse Kjus	Norway	14	-	-	5	9	-	-	-	-	-	-
	Richard Gravier	France	14	-	-	-	-	-	14	-	-	-	-
	Kentaro Minagawa	Japan	14	-	-	3	-	-	-	-	11	-	-
48	Aleš Gorza	Slovenia	13	-	13	-	-	-	-	-	-	-	-
	Stéphane Tissot	France	13	-	-	-	-	-	13	-	-	-	-
50	Hannes Paul Schmid	Italy	12	-	3	-	-	-	9	-	-	-	-
51	Alois Vogl	Germany	11	-	-	-	-	11	-	-	-	-	-
52	Martin Hansson	Sweden	10	-	-	-	10	-	-	-	-	-	-
53	Mitja Valenčič	Slovenia	9	-	-	9	-	-	-	-	-	-	-
	Alan Perathoner	Italy	9	-	-	-	-	9	-	-	-	-	-
	Didier Défago	Switzerland	9	-	-	-	-	-	-	-	-	9	-
56	Stanley Hayer	Canada	8	-	-	-	8	-	-	-	-	-	-
	Jukka Leino	Finland	8	-	-	-	-	8	-	-	-	-	-
58	Andrzej Bachleda	Poland	7	-	-	-	-	-	-	-	-	7	-
59	Kiminobu Kimura	Japan	5	-	-	-	-	5	-	-	-	-	-
	Jure Košir	Slovenia	5	-	-	-	-	-	5	-	-	-	-
61	Marco Casanova	Switzerland	3	3	-	-	-	-	-	-	-	-	-
62	Eduardo Zardini	Italy	1	-	1	-	-	-	-	-	-	-	-

Note:

In the last race only the best racers were allowed to compete and only the best 15 finishers were awarded with points.

Alpine skiing World Cup
Men

Overall | Downhill | Super G | Giant slalom | Slalom | Combined

2003
