= 2003 Alpine Skiing World Cup – Men's giant slalom =

2003 Men's giant slalom World Cup
Previous: 2002	Next: 2004

Men's giant slalom World Cup 2002/2003

== Final point standings ==
In men's giant slalom World Cup 2002/03 all results count. Michael von Grünigen won his fourth Giant slalom World Cup.

Place	Name	Country	Total points	1 (Austria)	2 (United States)	9 (France)	13 (Italy)	15 (Slovenia)	19 (Switzerland)	31 (South Korea)	36 (Norway)
1	Michael von Grünigen	Switzerland	524	60	100	100	18	24	80	100	60
2	Bode Miller	United States	425	45	-	80	100	100	-	60	40
3	Hans Knauß	Austria	365	11	26	32	40	40	100	16	100
4	Frédéric Covili	France	296	80	29	36	-	10	45	80	16
5	Heinz Schilchegger	Austria	249	24	9	10	20	36	50	50	50
	Massimiliano Blardone	Italy	249	36	50	11	45	15	32	36	24
7	Christian Mayer	Austria	234	10	80	-	60	80	-	4	-
8	Benjamin Raich	Austria	231	-	60	9	32	50	-	-	80
9	Christoph Gruber	Austria	227	26	9	60	16	16	36	40	24
10	Joël Chenal	France	194	20	-	50	50	-	-	45	29
11	Didier Défago	Switzerland	171	29	24	26	40	20	-	32	-
12	Erik Schlopy	United States	163	-	45	-	4	50	-	12	50
13	Fredrik Nyberg	Sweden	159	40	40	16	-	13	-	18	32
14	Kjetil André Aamodt	Norway	156	50	-	13	13	-	60	-	20
15	Arnold Rieder	Italy	150	10	22	45	-	32	15	26	-
16	Stephan Eberharter	Austria	147	100	32	-	-	7	-	8	-
17	Alessandro Roberto	Italy	117	3	11	29	24	12	16	22	-
18	Thomas Grandi	Canada	111	10	20	18	9	18	26	10	-
19	Davide Simoncelli	Italy	110	-	16	-	80	14	-	-	-
20	Didier Cuche	Switzerland	106	32	36	4	14	-	-	20	-
	Andreas Schifferer	Austria	106	16	13	26	11	-	29	11	-
22	Uroš Pavlovčič	Slovenia	99	13	15	3	26	29	13	-	-
23	Vincent Millet	France	79	22	-	15	13	-	-	29	-
24	Sami Uotila	Finland	66	-	6	-	-	60	-	-	-
25	Kalle Palander	Finland	60	-	-	-	6	-	14	-	40
26	Aksel Lund Svindal	Norway	54	-	-	8	29	11	-	6	-
27	Ivica Kostelić	Croatia	52	2	3	7	-	22	-	-	18
28	Peter Fill	Italy	51	-	-	40	3	-	8	-	-
29	Andreas Ertl	Germany	50	-	-	6	24	-	20	-	-
30	Bjarne Solbakken	Norway	46	14	-	20	-	-	-	12	-
31	Rainer Schönfelder	Austria	44	15	-	-	-	29	-	-	-
32	Jean-Pierre Vidal	France	42	5	-	-	8	5	24	-	-
33	Alberto Schieppati	Italy	41	-	10	14	-	4	-	13	-
34	Truls Ove Karlsen	Norway	40	-	-	-	-	-	40	-	-
35	Lasse Kjus	Norway	39	13	-	-	15	-	11	-	-
36	Tobias Grünenfelder	Germany	29	-	20	-	-	-	-	9	-
37	Josef Strobl	Austria	28	6	14	-	5	-	-	3	-
38	Michael Gufler	Italy	26	-	-	-	-	-	-	26	-
	Michael Walchhofer	Austria	26	-	-	-	-	-	-	-	26
40	Gauthier de Tessières	France	25	-	-	5	10	-	10	-	-
41	Martin Marinac	Austria	24	18	-	-	-	6	-	-	-
	Ambrosi Hoffmann	Switzerland	24	-	-	12	-	-	12	-	-
43	Jeff Piccard	France	22	-	-	22	-	-	-	-	-
	Julien Cousineau	Canada	22	-	-	-	-	-	22	-	-
45	Marco Büchel	Liechtenstein	21	-	12	-	-	9	-	-	-
38	Aleš Gorza	Slovenia	18	-	-	-	-	-	18	-	-
	Alexander Ploner	Italy	18	4	-	-	-	8	-	6	-
48	Andreas Nilsen	Norway	15	-	-	-	-	-	-	15	-
49	Dane Spencer	United States	9	-	9	-	-	-	-	-	-
	Daron Rahlves	United States	9	-	-	-	-	-	9	-	-
51	Jean-Philippe Roy	Canada	7	7	-	-	-	-	-	-	-
	Stephan Görgl	Austria	7	-	-	-	7	-	-	-	-
	Raphaël Burtin	France	7	-	-	-	-	-	-	7	-
54	Patrick Holzer	Italy	6	-	6	-	-	-	-	-	-
55	Thomas Vonn	United States	4	-	4	-	-	-	-	-	-
56	Marco Casanova	Switzerland	2	-	-	-	-	-	-	2	-

Note:

In the last race only the best racers were allowed to compete and only the best 15 finishers were awarded with points.

Alpine Skiing World Cup
Men

Overall | Downhill | Super G | Giant slalom | Slalom | Combined

2003
