= 2002 Alpine Skiing World Cup – Men's giant slalom =

2002 Men's giant slalom World Cup
Previous: 2001	Next: 2003

Men's giant slalom World Cup 2001/2002

== Final point standings ==
In men's giant slalom World Cup 2001/02 all results count.

Place	Name	Country	Total points	1 (Austria)	6 (France)	10 (Italy)	11 (Slovenia)	12 (Slovenia)	16 (Switzerland)	29 (Switzerland)	35 (Austria)
1	Frédéric Covili	France	471	100	80	100	29	24	80	13	45
2	Benjamin Raich	Austria	429	36	14	50	80	100	45	24	80
3	Stephan Eberharter	Austria	422	80	60	29	32	29	32	100	60
4	Didier Cuche	Switzerland	420	14	36	40	50	60	100	80	40
5	Frederik Nyberg	Sweden	405	60	32	24	100	50	60	29	50
6	Michael von Grünigen	Switzerland	356	60	45	80	13	40	-	18	100
7	Bode Miller	United States	310	45	100	-	15	80	20	50	-
8	Sami Uotila	Finland	250	16	26	60	45	20	22	45	16
9	Joël Chenal	France	207	22	22	10	18	45	40	26	24
10	Christoph Gruber	Austria	202	20	40	50	26	26	-	40	-
11	Vincent Millet	France	193	24	29	15	26	32	24	11	32
12	Massimiliano Blardone	Italy	182	13	50	32	-	13	50	-	24
13	Didier Défago	Switzerland	141	18	24	-	11	36	-	16	36
14	Hans Knauß	Austria	134	-	-	14	8	22	10	60	20
15	Christian Mayer	Austria	122	26	8	36	20	-	-	32	-
16	Kjetil André Aamodt	Norway	117	29	-	9	14	18	29	-	18
17	Andreas Schifferer	Austria	114	32	8	-	5	7	36	-	26
18	Uroš Pavlovčič	Slovenia	106	-	-	20	60	-	16	10	-
19	Alessandro Roberto	Italy	96	-	13	7	36	14	18	8	-
20	Thomas Grandi	Canada	79	-	16	-	40	9	14	-	-
21	Josef Strobl	Austria	71	10	2	11	22	13	13	-	-
22	Ivica Kostelić	Croatia	66	3	-	22	12	-	-	-	29
23	Tobias Grünenfelder	Switzerland	58	11	-	-	7	4	-	36	-
24	Bjarne Solbakken	Norway	57	-	9	26	-	8	-	14	-
25	Lasse Kjus	Norway	48	40	-	8	-	-	-	-	-
26	Dane Spencer	United States	39	-	-	-	6	-	26	7	-
27	Jernej Koblar	Slovenia	38	-	3	13	-	-	16	6	-
28	Jeff Piccard	France	37	-	12	5	16	-	-	4	-
29	Jean-Philippe Roy	Canada	35	5	20	-	-	10	-	-	-
30	Alexander Ploner	Italy	33	-	-	-	-	-	11	22	-
31	Arnold Rieder	Italy	32	-	-	-	-	11	9	12	-
32	Florian Seer	Austria	30	-	6	2	-	15	7	-	-
33	Davide Simoncelli	Italy	29	-	-	12	-	-	8	9	-
34	Erik Schlopy	United States	28	9	6	-	9	-	4	-	-
35	Thomas Vonn	United States	23	-	-	18	-	5	-	-	-
	Marco Büchel	Liechtenstein	21	-	1	-	-	-	5	15	-
37	Patrick Cogoli	Italy	20	2	15	3	-	-	-	-	-
	Mario Matt	Austria	20	4	-	-	-	16	-	-	-
	Stephan Görgl	Austria	20	4	-	-	-	16	-	-	-
40	Raphaël Burtin	France	19	-	10	-	4	-	-	5	-
41	Kalle Palander	Finland	18	-	18	-	-	-	-	-	-
42	Jure Košir	Slovenia	17	-	-	-	11	-	6	-	-
43	Alberto Schieppati	Italy	16	-	-	16	-	-	-	-	-
44	Rainer Salzgeber	Austria	15	15	-	-	-	-	-	-	-
45	Daron Rahlves	United States	12	12	-	-	-	-	-	-	-
	Steve Locher	Switzerland	12	-	-	-	-	-	12	-	-
47	Patrick Holzer	Italy	11	-	11	-	-	-	-	-	-
48	Kenneth Sivertsen	Norway	10	-	-	4	-	6-	-	-	-
49	Christophe Saioni	France	8	8	-	-	-	-	-	-	-
50	Paul Accola	Switzerland	7	7	-	-	-	-	-	-	-
51	Heinz Schilchegger	Austria	6	6	-	-	-	-	-	-	-
	Gauthier de Tessières	France	6	-	6	-	-	-	-	-	-
	Jean-Pierre Vidal	France	6	-	-	6	-	-	-	-	-

Alpine Skiing World Cup
Men

Overall | Downhill | Super G | Giant slalom | Slalom | Combined

2002
