= 2002–03 FIS Alpine Ski World Cup =

International sports competition

FIS Alpine Ski World Cup 2002/03
| Discipline | Men | Women |
| Overall | (Austria) Stephan Eberharter | (Croatia) Janica Kostelić |
| Downhill | (Austria) Stephan Eberharter | (Austria) Michaela Dorfmeister |
| Super-G | (Austria) Stephan Eberharter | (France) Carole Montillet |
| Giant slalom | (Switzerland) Michael von Grünigen | (Sweden) Anja Pärson |
| Slalom | (Finland) Kalle Palander | (Croatia) Janica Kostelić |
| Combined | (United States) Bode Miller | (Croatia) Janica Kostelić |
- Nations Cup: Austria

Competition
| Locations | 18 | 14 |
| Individual | 37 | 33 |
| Cancelled | — | — |
| Rescheduled | 3 | — |

The 37th World Cup season began in October 2002 on Sölden, Austria, and concluded in March 2003 at the World Cup finals in Lillehammer, Norway. The overall winners were Stephan Eberharter of Austria and Janica Kostelić of Croatia.

A break in the schedule was for the 2003 World Championships, held in St. Moritz, Switzerland, from 2–16 February 2003.

== Calendar ==
=== Men ===
Event key: DH – Downhill, SL – Slalom, GS – Giant slalom, SG – Super giant slalom, K.O. – Slalom (knock-out system), KB – Combined
| Race | Season | Date | Place | Type | Winner | Second | Third |
|---|---|---|---|---|---|---|---|
| 1113 | 1 | 27 October 2002 | (Austria) Sölden | GS _{281} | (Austria) Stephan Eberharter | (France) Frédéric Covili | (Switzerland) Michael von Grünigen |
| 1114 | 2 | 22 November 2002 | (United States) Park City | GS _{282} | (Switzerland) Michael von Grünigen | (Austria) Christian Mayer | (Austria) Benjamin Raich |
| 1115 | 3 | 24 November 2002 | (United States) Park City | SL _{322} | (Austria) Rainer Schönfelder | (France) Pierrick Bourgeat | (Austria) Benjamin Raich |
| 1116 | 4 | 30 November 2002 | (Canada) Lake Louise | DH _{325} | (Austria) Stephan Eberharter | (Austria) Hannes Trinkl | (Norway) Kjetil André Aamodt |
| 1117 | 5 | 1 December 2002 | (Canada) Lake Louise | SG _{104} | (Austria) Stephan Eberharter | (Austria) Josef Strobl | (Switzerland) Didier Cuche |
| 1118 | 6 | 7 December 2002 | (United States) Beaver Creek | DH _{326} | (Austria) Stephan Eberharter | (Austria) Michael Walchhofer | (United States) Daron Rahlves |
| 1119 | 7 | 8 December 2002 | (United States) Beaver Creek | SG _{105} | (Switzerland) Didier Cuche | (Liechtenstein) Marco Büchel | (Austria) Hannes Trinkl |
| 1120 | 8 | 14 December 2002 | (France) Val d'Isère | DH _{327} | (Austria) Stephan Eberharter | (Austria) Klaus Kröll | (Austria) Andreas Schifferer |
| 1121 | 9 | 15 December 2002 | (France) Val d'Isère | GS _{283} | (Switzerland) Michael von Grünigen | (United States) Bode Miller | (Austria) Christoph Gruber |
| 1122 | 10 | 16 December 2002 | (Italy) Sestriere | KO _{001} | (Croatia) Ivica Kostelić | (Italy) Giorgio Rocca | (Norway) Truls Ove Karlsen |
| 1123 | 11 | 20 December 2002 | (Italy) Val Gardena | SG _{106} | (Switzerland) Didier Défago | (Austria) Hannes Reichelt | (Liechtenstein) Marco Büchel |
| 1124 | 12 | 21 December 2002 | (Italy) Val Gardena | DH _{328} | (France) Antoine Dénériaz | (Austria) Michael Walchhofer | (Austria) Josef Strobl |
| 1125 | 13 | 22 December 2002 | (Italy) Alta Badia | GS _{284} | (United States) Bode Miller | (Italy) Davide Simoncelli | (Austria) Christian Mayer |
| 1126 | 14 | 29 December 2002 | (Italy) Bormio | DH _{329} | (United States) Daron Rahlves | (Austria) Fritz Strobl | (Austria) Hannes Trinkl |
| 1127 | 15 | 4 January 2003 | (Slovenia) Kranjska Gora | GS _{285} | (United States) Bode Miller | (Austria) Christian Mayer | (Finland) Sami Uotila |
| 1128 | 16 | 5 January 2003 | (Slovenia) Kranjska Gora | SL _{323} | (Croatia) Ivica Kostelić | (Austria) Rainer Schönfelder | (France) Jean-Pierre Vidal |
| | | 11 January 2003 | (France) Chamonix | DH _{cnx} | replaced in Bormio on 11 January 2003 | | |
| | | 12 January 2003 | (France) Chamonix | SL _{cnx} | replaced in Bormio on 12 January 2003 | | |
| 1129 | 17 | (Note: Downhill from Chamonix was rescheduled to Bormio on 11 January 2003)11 January 2003 | (Italy) Bormio | DH _{330} | (Austria) Stephan Eberharter | (Austria) Michael Walchhofer | (United States) Daron Rahlves |
| 1130 | 18 | (Note: Slalom from Chamonix was rescheduled to Bormio on 12 January 2003)12 January 2003 | (Italy) Bormio | SL _{324} | (Croatia) Ivica Kostelić | (United States) Bode Miller | (Norway) Hans Petter Buraas |
| 1131 | 19 | 14 January 2003 | (Switzerland) Adelboden | GS _{286} | (Austria) Hans Knauß | (Switzerland) Michael von Grünigen | (Norway) Kjetil André Aamodt |
| 1132 | 20 | 17 January 2003 | (Switzerland) Wengen | DH _{331} | (Austria) Stephan Eberharter | (United States) Daron Rahlves | (Switzerland) Bruno Kernen |
| 1133 | 21 | 18 January 2003 | (Switzerland) Wengen | DH _{332} | (Switzerland) Bruno Kernen | (Austria) Michael Walchhofer | (Austria) Stephan Eberharter |
| 1134 | 22 | 19 January 2003 | (Switzerland) Wengen | SL _{325} | (Italy) Giorgio Rocca | (Japan) Akira Sasaki | (Croatia) Ivica Kostelić |
| 1135 | 23 | 19 January 2003 | (Switzerland) Wengen | KB _{083} | (Norway) Kjetil André Aamodt | (United States) Bode Miller | (Norway) Lasse Kjus |
| | | 24 January 2003 | (Austria) Kitzbühel | SG _{cnx} | replaced in Kitzbühel on 27 January 2003 | | |
| 1136 | 24 | 25 January 2003 | (Austria) Kitzbühel | DH _{333} | (United States) Daron Rahlves | (Switzerland) Didier Cuche | (Norway) Kjetil André Aamodt |
| 1137 | 25 | 26 January 2003 | (Austria) Kitzbühel | SL _{326} | (Finland) Kalle Palander | (Austria) Rainer Schönfelder | (Austria) Heinz Schilchegger |
| 1138 | 26 | 26 January 2003 | (Austria) Kitzbühel | KB _{084} | (Austria) Michael Walchhofer | (Norway) Aksel Lund Svindal | (Switzerland) Didier Défago |
| 1139 | 27 | (Note: Super giant slalom from Kitzbühel was rescheduled from 24 to 27 January 2003)27 January 2003 | (Austria) Kitzbühel | SG _{107} | (Austria) Hermann Maier | (Austria) Christoph Gruber | (Austria) Stephan Eberharter |
| 1140 | 28 | 28 January 2003 | (Austria) Schladming | SL _{327} | (Finland) Kalle Palander | (Austria) Benjamin Raich | (Norway) Hans Petter Buraas |
2003 World Championships (2–16 February)
| 1141 | 29 | 22 February 2003 | (Germany) Garmisch-Partenkirchen | DH _{334} | (Austria) Stephan Eberharter | (Switzerland) Didier Cuche | (United States) Daron Rahlves |
| 1142 | 30 | 23 February 2003 | (Germany) Garmisch-Partenkirchen | SG _{108} | (Liechtenstein) Marco Büchel | (Austria) Stephan Eberharter | (Switzerland) Tobias Grünenfelder |
| 1143 | 31 | 1 March 2003 | (South Korea) Yongpyong | GS _{287} | (Switzerland) Michael von Grünigen | (France) Frédéric Covili | (United States) Bode Miller |
| 1144 | 32 | 2 March 2003 | (South Korea) Yongpyong | SL _{328} | (Finland) Kalle Palander | (Italy) Giorgio Rocca | (Austria) Benjamin Raich |
| 1145 | 33 | 8 March 2003 | (Japan) Shiga Kōgen | SL _{329} | (Finland) Kalle Palander (Austria) Rainer Schönfelder | | (Italy) Giorgio Rocca |
| 1146 | 34 | 12 March 2003 | (Norway) Lillehammer | DH _{335} | (France) Antoine Dénériaz | (Austria) Stephan Eberharter | (United States) Daron Rahlves |
| 1147 | 35 | 13 March 2003 | (Norway) Lillehammer | SG _{109} | (Austria) Stephan Eberharter | (Norway) Lasse Kjus | (Austria) Hannes Reichelt |
| 1148 | 36 | 15 March 2003 | (Norway) Lillehammer | GS _{288} | (Austria) Hans Knauß | (Austria) Benjamin Raich | (Switzerland) Michael von Grünigen |
| 1149 | 37 | 16 March 2003 | (Norway) Lillehammer | SL _{330} | (Italy) Giorgio Rocca | (Finland) Kalle Palander | (Austria) Manfred Pranger |

=== Ladies ===
Event key: DH – Downhill, SL – Slalom, GS – Giant slalom, SG – Super giant slalom, K.O. – Slalom (knock-out system), KB – Combined
| Race | Season | Date | Place | Type | Winner | Second | Third |
|---|---|---|---|---|---|---|---|
| 1045 | 1 | 26 October 2002 | (Austria) Sölden | GS _{277} | (Norway) Andrine Flemmen (Austria) Nicole Hosp (Slovenia) Tina Maze | | |
| 1046 | 2 | 21 November 2002 | (United States) Park City | GS _{278} | (Liechtenstein) Birgit Heeb | (Austria) Alexandra Meissnitzer | (Croatia) Janica Kostelić |
| 1047 | 3 | 23 November 2002 | (United States) Park City | SL _{312} | (Croatia) Janica Kostelić | (France) Christel Pascal | (Austria) Sabine Egger |
| 1048 | 4 | 29 November 2002 | (United States) Aspen | SG _{112} | (Germany) Hilde Gerg | (Croatia) Janica Kostelić | (Italy) Isolde Kostner |
| 1049 | 5 | 30 November 2002 | (United States) Aspen | SL _{313} | (Sweden) Anja Pärson | (Croatia) Janica Kostelić | (Austria) Marlies Schild |
| 1050 | 6 | 6 December 2002 | (Canada) Lake Louise | DH _{273} | (Germany) Hilde Gerg | (France) Carole Montillet | (United States) Kirsten Lee Clark |
| 1051 | 7 | 7 December 2002 | (Canada) Lake Louise | DH _{274} | (France) Carole Montillet | (Switzerland) Corinne Rey-Bellet | (Austria) Renate Götschl |
| 1052 | 8 | 8 December 2002 | (Canada) Lake Louise | SG _{113} | (Italy) Karen Putzer | (Germany) Martina Ertl | (France) Carole Montillet |
| 1053 | 9 | 12 December 2002 | (France) Val d'Isère | GS _{279} | (Italy) Karen Putzer | (Switzerland) Sonja Nef | (Austria) Michaela Dorfmeister (Austria) Alexandra Meissnitzer |
| 1054 | 10 | 13 December 2002 | (France) Val d'Isère | SG _{114} | (France) Carole Montillet | (Italy) Daniela Ceccarelli | (Austria) Michaela Dorfmeister |
| 1055 | 11 | 15 December 2002 | (Italy) Sestriere | KO _{001} | (Sweden) Anja Pärson | (Finland) Tanja Poutiainen | (Austria) Nicole Hosp |
| 1056 | 12 | 21 December 2002 | (Switzerland) Lenzerheide | DH _{275} | (Austria) Michaela Dorfmeister | (Austria) Brigitte Obermoser | (United States) Kirsten Lee Clark |
| 1057 | 13 | 22 December 2002 | (Switzerland) Lenzerheide | SL _{314} | (Croatia) Janica Kostelić | (Finland) Tanja Poutiainen | (New Zealand) Claudia Riegler |
| 1058 | 14 | 22 December 2002 | (Switzerland) Lenzerheide | KB _{072} | (Croatia) Janica Kostelić | (Germany) Martina Ertl | (Germany) Maria Riesch |
| 1059 | 15 | 28 December 2002 | (Austria) Semmering | GS _{280} | (Italy) Karen Putzer | (Croatia) Janica Kostelić | (Austria) Nicole Hosp (Italy) Denise Karbon |
| 1060 | 16 | 29 December 2002 | (Austria) Semmering | SL _{315} | (Croatia) Janica Kostelić | (France) Christel Pascal | (Italy) Nicole Gius |
| 1061 | 17 | 4 January 2003 | (Italy) Bormio | GS _{281} | (Switzerland) Sonja Nef | (Sweden) Anja Pärson | (Austria) Michaela Dorfmeister |
| 1062 | 18 | 5 January 2003 | (Italy) Bormio | SL _{316} | (Croatia) Janica Kostelić | (Austria) Elisabeth Görgl | (Sweden) Anja Pärson |
| 1063 | 19 | 15 January 2003 | (Italy) Cortina d'Ampezzo | SG _{115} | (France) Carole Montillet | (Austria) Renate Götschl | (Germany) Hilde Gerg |
| 1064 | 20 | 17 January 2003 | (Italy) Cortina d'Ampezzo | SG _{116} | (Austria) Renate Götschl | (Austria) Alexandra Meissnitzer | (Canada) Mélanie Turgeon |
| 1065 | 21 | 18 January 2003 | (Italy) Cortina d'Ampezzo | DH _{276} | (Austria) Renate Götschl | (United States) Kirsten Lee Clark | (Austria) Michaela Dorfmeister |
| 1066 | 22 | 19 January 2003 | (Italy) Cortina d'Ampezzo | GS _{282} | (Sweden) Anja Pärson | (Croatia) Janica Kostelić | (Italy) Karen Putzer |
| 1067 | 23 | 25 January 2003 | (Slovenia) Maribor | GS _{283} | (Sweden) Anja Pärson | (Austria) Nicole Hosp | (Germany) Martina Ertl |
| 1068 | 24 | 26 January 2003 | (Slovenia) Maribor | SL _{317} | (Sweden) Anja Pärson | (Croatia) Janica Kostelić | (Austria) Nicole Hosp |
2003 World Championships (2–16 February)
| 1069 | 25 | 28 February 2003 | (Austria) Innsbruck | SG _{117} | (Austria) Renate Götschl | (France) Carole Montillet | (Austria) Alexandra Meissnitzer |
| 1070 | 26 | 1 March 2003 | (Austria) Innsbruck | DH _{277} | (Austria) Michaela Dorfmeister | (Austria) Katja Wirth | (Germany) Hilde Gerg |
| 1071 | 27 | 2 March 2003 | (Austria) Innsbruck | SG _{118} | (Austria) Brigitte Obermoser | (France) Carole Montillet | (Austria) Renate Götschl |
| 1072 | 28 | 6 March 2003 | (Sweden) Åre | GS _{284} | (Sweden) Anja Pärson | (Italy) Daniela Merighetti | (Italy) Denise Karbon |
| 1073 | 29 | 8 March 2003 | (Sweden) Åre | SL _{318} | (Croatia) Janica Kostelić | (Sweden) Anja Pärson | (Germany) Monika Bergmann |
| 1074 | 30 | 12 March 2003 | (Norway) Lillehammer | DH _{278} | (Austria) Renate Götschl | (France) Ingrid Jacquemod | (United States) Kirsten Lee Clark |
| 1075 | 31 | 13 March 2003 | (Norway) Lillehammer | SG _{119} | (Italy) Karen Putzer | (Germany) Martina Ertl (Austria) Alexandra Meissnitzer | |
| 1076 | 32 | 15 March 2003 | (Norway) Lillehammer | SL _{319} | (United States) Kristina Koznick | (France) Laure Pequegnot | (Austria) Marlies Schild |
| 1077 | 33 | 16 March 2003 | (Norway) Lillehammer | GS _{285} | (Italy) Karen Putzer | (Italy) Denise Karbon | (Austria) Nicole Hosp |

== Men ==
At the World Cup finals in Lillehammer (Kvitfjell, Hafjell), only the best racers were allowed to compete and only the top 15 finishers were awarded with points.

=== Overall ===
see complete table

| Place | Name | Country | Total |
|---|---|---|---|
| 1 | Stephan Eberharter | Austria | 1333 |
| 2 | Bode Miller | United States | 1100 |
| 3 | Kjetil André Aamodt | Norway | 940 |
| 4 | Kalle Palander | Finland | 718 |
| 5 | Didier Cuche | Switzerland | 709 |
| 6 | Daron Rahlves | United States | 647 |
| 7 | Ivica Kostelić | Croatia | 632 |
| 8 | Benjamin Raich | Austria | 622 |
| 9 | Michael Walchhofer | Austria | 600 |
| 10 | Hans Knauß | Austria | 596 |

=== Downhill ===
see complete table

In men's downhill World Cup 2002/03 the all results count.

| Place | Name | Country | Total | 4 (Canada) | 6 (United States) | 8 (France) | 12 (Italy) | 14 (Italy) | 17 (Italy) | 20 (Switzerland) | 21 (Switzerland) | 24 (Austria) | 29 (Germany) | 34 (Norway) |
|---|---|---|---|---|---|---|---|---|---|---|---|---|---|---|
| 1 | Stephan Eberharter | Austria | 790 | 100 | 100 | 100 | - | - | 100 | 100 | 60 | 50 | 100 | 80 |
| 2 | Daron Rahlves | United States | 593 | 7 | 60 | 10 | 24 | 100 | 60 | 80 | 32 | 100 | 60 | 60 |
| 3 | Michael Walchhofer | Austria | 430 | 40 | 80 | 8 | 80 | 29 | 80 | - | 80 | 9 | - | 24 |
| 4 | Bruno Kernen | Switzerland | 351 | 5 | 15 | 32 | 20 | - | 36 | 60 | 100 | 14 | 29 | 40 |
| 5 | Hannes Trinkl | Austria | 341 | 80 | 26 | 26 | 40 | 60 | 26 | 24 | 14 | 45 | - | - |
| 6 | Antoine Dénériaz | France | 337 | 11 | - | 50 | 100 | - | 18 | - | 40 | 18 | - | 100 |
| 7 | Fritz Strobl | Austria | 334 | 45 | 50 | 11 | 50 | 80 | 14 | - | 26 | 26 | 32 | - |
| | Kjetil André Aamodt | Norway | 334 | 60 | 36 | 45 | 14 | - | - | 32 | 29 | 60 | 13 | 45 |
| 9 | Didier Cuche | Switzerland | 333 | 9 | 45 | - | 11 | 22 | 45 | 14 | 5 | 80 | 80 | 22 |
| 10 | Klaus Kröll | Austria | 317 | 22 | 22 | 80 | 32 | 32 | 50 | 26 | - | 24 | - | 29 |

=== Super G ===
see complete table

In men's super G World Cup 2002/03 all results count.

| Place | Name | Country | Total | 5 (Canada) | 7 (United States) | 11 (Italy) | 27 (Austria) | 30 (Germany) | 35 (Norway) |
|---|---|---|---|---|---|---|---|---|---|
| 1 | Stephan Eberharter | Austria | 356 | 100 | 16 | - | 60 | 80 | 100 |
| 2 | Marco Büchel | Liechtenstein | 280 | 40 | 80 | 60 | - | 100 | - |
| 3 | Didier Cuche | Switzerland | 270 | 60 | 100 | 20 | 40 | 18 | 32 |
| 4 | Kjetil André Aamodt | Norway | 251 | 50 | 36 | 50 | 29 | 36 | 50 |
| 5 | Hannes Reichelt | Austria | 194 | - | - | 80 | 32 | 22 | 60 |
| 6 | Christoph Gruber | Austria | 185 | 5 | 9 | 29 | 80 | 40 | 22 |
| 7 | Didier Défago | Switzerland | 180 | 16 | 50 | 100 | 3 | 11 | - |
| 8 | Andreas Schifferer | Austria | 165 | 45 | 22 | 32 | 50 | 16 | - |
| 9 | Hannes Trinkl | Austria | 155 | 24 | 60 | - | 26 | - | 45 |
| 10 | Josef Strobl | Austria | 150 | 80 | - | 24 | 18 | 12 | 16 |
| 11 | Lasse Kjus | Norway | 140 | 20 | 14 | 26 | - | - | 80 |
| 12 | Bode Miller | United States | 138 | 36 | 40 | 40 | 22 | - | - |
| | Bruno Kernen | Switzerland | 138 | 10 | - | 45 | 14 | 29 | 40 |
| 14 | Hans Knauß | Austria | 131 | - | 29 | 18 | 45 | 10 | 29 |
| 15 | Ambrosi Hoffmann | Switzerland | 127 | 15 | 45 | - | 24 | 7 | 36 |
| 16 | Fritz Strobl | Austria | 124 | 26 | - | 12 | 36 | 50 | - |
| 17 | Tobias Grünenfelder | Switzerland | 107 | 13 | 26 | - | 8 | 60 | - |
| 18 | Franco Cavegn | Switzerland | 102 | 32 | 18 | 1 | 5 | 20 | 26 |
| 19 | Hermann Maier | Austria | 100 | - | - | - | 100 | - | - |

=== Giant slalom ===
see complete table

In men's giant slalom World Cup 2002/03 all results count. Michael von Grünigen won his fourth Giant slalom World Cup.

| Place | Name | Country | Total | 1 (Austria) | 2 (United States) | 9 (France) | 13 (Italy) | 15 (Slovenia) | 19 (Switzerland) | 31 (South Korea) | 36 (Norway) |
|---|---|---|---|---|---|---|---|---|---|---|---|
| 1 | Michael von Grünigen | Switzerland | 524 | 60 | 100 | 100 | 18 | 24 | 80 | 100 | 60 |
| 2 | Bode Miller | United States | 425 | 45 | - | 80 | 100 | 100 | - | 60 | 40 |
| 3 | Hans Knauß | Austria | 365 | 11 | 26 | 32 | 40 | 40 | 100 | 16 | 100 |
| 4 | Frédéric Covili | France | 296 | 80 | 29 | 36 | - | 10 | 45 | 80 | 16 |
| 5 | Heinz Schilchegger | Austria | 249 | 24 | 9 | 10 | 20 | 36 | 50 | 50 | 50 |
| | Massimiliano Blardone | Italy | 249 | 36 | 50 | 11 | 45 | 15 | 32 | 36 | 24 |
| 7 | Christian Mayer | Austria | 234 | 10 | 80 | - | 60 | 80 | - | 4 | - |
| 8 | Benjamin Raich | Austria | 231 | - | 60 | 9 | 32 | 50 | - | - | 80 |
| 9 | Christoph Gruber | Austria | 227 | 26 | 9 | 60 | 16 | 16 | 36 | 40 | 24 |
| 10 | Joël Chenal | France | 194 | 20 | - | 50 | 50 | - | - | 45 | 29 |
| 11 | Didier Défago | Switzerland | 171 | 29 | 24 | 26 | 40 | 20 | - | 32 | - |
| 12 | Erik Schlopy | United States | 163 | - | 45 | - | 4 | 50 | - | 12 | 50 |
| 13 | Fredrik Nyberg | Sweden | 159 | 40 | 40 | 16 | - | 13 | - | 18 | 32 |
| 14 | Kjetil André Aamodt | Norway | 156 | 50 | - | 13 | 13 | - | 60 | - | 20 |
| 15 | Arnold Rieder | Italy | 150 | 10 | 22 | 45 | - | 32 | 15 | 26 | - |
| 16 | Stephan Eberharter | Austria | 147 | 100 | 32 | - | - | 7 | - | 8 | - |

=== Slalom ===
see complete table

In men's slalom World Cup 2002/03 the all results count. Race No. 10 at Sestriere was a K.O.-Slalom.

| Place | Name | Country | Total | 3 (United States) | 10 (Italy) | 16 (Slovenia) | 18 (Italy) | 22 (Switzerland) | 25 (Austria) | 28 (Austria) | 32 (South Korea) | 33 (Japan) | 37 (Norway) |
|---|---|---|---|---|---|---|---|---|---|---|---|---|---|
| 1 | Kalle Palander | Finland | 658 | 11 | 22 | 50 | 45 | 50 | 100 | 100 | 100 | 100 | 80 |
| 2 | Ivica Kostelić | Croatia | 580 | 18 | 100 | 100 | 100 | 60 | 50 | 50 | 16 | 50 | 36 |
| 3 | Rainer Schönfelder | Austria | 473 | 100 | - | 80 | 36 | 18 | 80 | 6 | 8 | 100 | 45 |
| 4 | Giorgio Rocca | Italy | 438 | 13 | 80 | - | - | 100 | - | 5 | 80 | 60 | 100 |
| 5 | Manfred Pranger | Austria | 385 | 50 | 26 | 45 | 50 | 32 | - | 45 | 32 | 45 | 60 |
| 6 | Benjamin Raich | Austria | 367 | 60 | 10 | 40 | 40 | - | 45 | 80 | 60 | - | 32 |
| 7 | Hans Petter Buraas | Norway | 280 | - | 50 | 32 | 60 | 45 | - | 60 | 15 | 18 | - |
| 8 | Truls Ove Karlsen | Norway | 263 | 45 | 60 | - | 20 | 24 | 32 | 24 | - | 29 | 29 |
| 9 | Pierrick Bourgeat | France | 224 | 80 | 2 | - | - | 6 | 18 | 18 | 20 | 26 | 24 |
| 10 | Jean-Pierre Vidal | France | 200 | 40 | 45 | 60 | - | 40 | - | - | - | 15 | - |

=== Combined ===
see complete table

In men's combined World Cup 2002/03 both results count.

| Place | Name | Country | Total | 23 (Switzerland) | 26 (Austria) |
|---|---|---|---|---|---|
| 1 | Bode Miller | United States | 125 | 80 | 45 |
| 2 | Kjetil André Aamodt | Norway | 100 | 100 | - |
| | Michael Walchhofer | Austria | 100 | - | 100 |
| 4 | Aksel Lund Svindal | Norway | 80 | - | 80 |
| 5 | Ambrosi Hoffmann | Switzerland | 72 | 36 | 36 |
| | Bruno Kernen | Switzerland | 72 | 40 | 32 |
| 7 | Lasse Kjus | Norway | 60 | 60 | - |
| | Didier Défago | Switzerland | 60 | - | 60 |
| 9 | Gaetan Llorach | France | 50 | 50 | - |
| | Christoph Gruber | Austria | 50 | - | 50 |

== Ladies ==
At the World Cup finals in Lillehammer (Kvitfjell, Hafjell), only the best racers were allowed to compete and only the top 15 finishers were awarded with points.

=== Overall ===
see complete table

| Place | Name | Country | Total |
|---|---|---|---|
| 1 | Janica Kostelić | Croatia | 1570 |
| 2 | Karen Putzer | Italy | 1100 |
| 3 | Anja Pärson | Sweden | 1042 |
| 4 | Michaela Dorfmeister | Austria | 972 |
| 5 | Martina Ertl | Germany | 922 |
| 6 | Carole Montillet | France | 869 |
| 7 | Renate Götschl | Austria | 830 |
| 8 | Alexandra Meissnitzer | Austria | 776 |
| 9 | Kirsten Clark | United States | 661 |
| 10 | Nicole Hosp | Austria | 558 |

=== Downhill ===
see complete table

In women's downhill World Cup 2002/03 all results count.

| Place | Name | Country | Total | 6 (Canada) | 7 (Canada) | 12 (Switzerland) | 21 (Italy) | 26 (Austria) | 30 (Norway) |
|---|---|---|---|---|---|---|---|---|---|
| 1 | Michaela Dorfmeister | Austria | 372 | 22 | 50 | 100 | 60 | 100 | 40 |
| 2 | Renate Götschl | Austria | 368 | 36 | 60 | 22 | 100 | 50 | 100 |
| 3 | Kirsten Clark | United States | 316 | 60 | 45 | 60 | 80 | 11 | 60 |
| 4 | Carole Montillet | France | 313 | 80 | 100 | 15 | 50 | 36 | 32 |
| 5 | Corinne Rey-Bellet | Switzerland | 230 | 40 | 80 | 13 | 16 | 45 | 36 |
| 6 | Hilde Gerg | Germany | 196 | 100 | - | - | 36 | 60 | - |
| 7 | Ingrid Jacquemod | France | 153 | 20 | 32 | 2 | 18 | 1 | 80 |
| 8 | Mélanie Turgeon | Canada | 149 | - | 18 | 40 | 26 | 20 | 45 |
| 9 | Karen Putzer | Italy | 143 | 16 | 22 | 26 | 40 | 15 | 24 |
| 10 | Alexandra Meissnitzer | Austria | 139 | 45 | 16 | 4 | 22 | 26 | 26 |

=== Super G ===
see complete table

In women's super G World Cup 2002/03 all results count.

| Place | Name | Country | Total | 4 (United States) | 8 (Canada) | 10 (France) | 19 (Italy) | 20 (Italy) | 25 (Austria) | 27 (Austria) | 31 (Norway) |
|---|---|---|---|---|---|---|---|---|---|---|---|
| 1 | Carole Montillet | France | 493 | 18 | 60 | 100 | 100 | 29 | 80 | 80 | 26 |
| 2 | Renate Götschl | Austria | 458 | - | 18 | 50 | 80 | 100 | 100 | 60 | 50 |
| 3 | Karen Putzer | Italy | 394 | 40 | 100 | 36 | 26 | 50 | 16 | 26 | 100 |
| 4 | Alexandra Meissnitzer | Austria | 350 | - | 3 | 32 | 45 | 80 | 60 | 50 | 80 |
| 5 | Michaela Dorfmeister | Austria | 298 | 36 | 45 | 60 | 22 | - | 50 | 40 | 45 |
| 6 | Daniela Ceccarelli | Italy | 289 | 24 | 26 | 80 | 24 | 36 | 29 | 50 | 20 |
| 7 | Hilde Gerg | Germany | 281 | 100 | - | - | 60 | 40 | 45 | 36 | - |
| | Janica Kostelić | Croatia | 281 | 80 | 36 | 28 | 36 | 45 | 16 | 32 | 18 |
| 9 | Martina Ertl | Germany | 267 | 32 | 80 | 14 | 13 | 10 | 24 | 14 | 80 |
| 10 | Kirsten Clark | United States | 252 | 50 | 50 | 40 | 18 | 18 | 11 | 29 | 36 |
| 11 | Brigitte Obermoser | Austria | 213 | 7 | 13 | - | - | 13 | 40 | 100 | 40 |

=== Giant slalom ===
see complete table

In women's giant slalom World Cup 2002/03 all results count.

| Place | Name | Country | Total | 1 (Austria) | 2 (United States) | 9 (France) | 15 (Austria) | 17 (Italy) | 22 (Italy) | 23 (Slovenia) | 28 (Sweden) | 33 (Norway) |
|---|---|---|---|---|---|---|---|---|---|---|---|---|
| 1 | Anja Pärson | Sweden | 514 | 26 | 50 | - | 13 | 80 | 100 | 100 | 100 | 45 |
| 2 | Karen Putzer | Italy | 513 | - | 29 | 100 | 100 | 50 | 60 | 45 | 29 | 100 |
| 3 | Janica Kostelić | Croatia | 343 | 24 | 60 | 45 | 80 | - | 80 | 14 | 40 | - |
| 4 | Nicole Hosp | Austria | 332 | 100 | - | 32 | 60 | - | - | 80 | - | 60 |
| 5 | Sonja Nef | Switzerland | 329 | 40 | 45 | 80 | 40 | 100 | - | 24 | - | - |
| 6 | Denise Karbon | Italy | 293 | - | - | 13 | 60 | 10 | 50 | 20 | 60 | 80 |
| 7 | Alexandra Meissnitzer | Austria | 287 | - | 80 | 60 | 32 | 40 | 22 | 16 | 13 | 24 |
| 8 | Martina Ertl | Germany | 280 | - | 24 | 22 | 20 | 18 | 36 | 60 | 50 | 50 |
| 9 | Michaela Dorfmeister | Austria | 266 | 22 | 7 | 60 | 22 | 60 | 45 | 50 | - | - |
| 10 | María José Rienda Contreras | Spain | 237 | 45 | 14 | 40 | 26 | 45 | 29 | 32 | 6 | - |
| 11 | Andrine Flemmen | Norway | 232 | 100 | - | 11 | 16 | 26 | 8 | 15 | 16 | 40 |
| 12 | Anna Ottosson | Sweden | 194 | 20 | 40 | 26 | 15 | 36 | 12 | 9 | 20 | 16 |
| 13 | Tina Maze | Slovenia | 190 | 100 | - | - | - | 8 | 24 | 36 | - | 22 |
| 14 | Tanja Poutiainen | Finland | 184 | 29 | - | 18 | 29 | 32 | - | 40 | 36 | - |
| 15 | Birgit Heeb-Batliner | Liechtenstein | 180 | - | 100 | 36 | 1 | 5 | 11 | 18 | 9 | - |

=== Slalom ===
see complete table

In women's slalom World Cup 2002/03 all results count. Race No. 11 at Sestriere was a K.O.-Slalom.

| Place | Name | Country | Total | 3 (United States) | 5 (United States) | 11 (Italy) | 13 (Switzerland) | 16 (Austria) | 18 (Italy) | 24 (Slovenia) | 29 (Sweden) | 32 (Norway) |
|---|---|---|---|---|---|---|---|---|---|---|---|---|
| 1 | Janica Kostelić | Croatia | 710 | 100 | 80 | 50 | 100 | 100 | 100 | 80 | 100 | - |
| 2 | Anja Pärson | Sweden | 498 | 18 | 100 | 100 | - | - | 60 | 100 | 80 | 40 |
| 3 | Tanja Poutiainen | Finland | 367 | 12 | 18 | 80 | 80 | - | 50 | 32 | 45 | 50 |
| 4 | Christel Pascal | France | 359 | 80 | 45 | 26 | 14 | 80 | 13 | 45 | 32 | 24 |
| 5 | Marlies Schild | Austria | 342 | 45 | 60 | 22 | - | 40 | 36 | 50 | 29 | 60 |
| 6 | Laure Pequegnot | France | 341 | 50 | - | 40 | - | 50 | 36 | 45 | 40 | 80 |
| 7 | Nicole Gius | Italy | 264 | 29 | 36 | 20 | 18 | 60 | 13 | 2 | 50 | 36 |
| 8 | Monika Bergmann | Germany | 245 | 20 | 24 | 16 | 50 | 26 | 40 | 9 | 60 | - |
| 9 | Martina Ertl | Germany | 228 | 24 | 32 | 32 | 13 | - | 36 | 10 | 36 | 45 |
| 10 | Nicole Hosp | Austria | 226 | 32 | 50 | 60 | - | - | 24 | 60 | - | - |
| 11 | Kristina Koznick | United States | 212 | 13 | - | 11 | 26 | - | 26 | 36 | - | 100 |

=== Combined ===
see complete table

In women's combined World Cup 2002/03 only one competition was held.

| Place | Name | Country | Total | 14 (Switzerland) |
|---|---|---|---|---|
| 1 | Janica Kostelić | Croatia | 100 | 100 |
| 2 | Martina Ertl | Germany | 80 | 80 |
| 3 | Maria Riesch | Germany | 60 | 60 |
| 4 | Karen Putzer | Italy | 50 | 50 |
| 5 | Julia Mancuso | United States | 45 | 45 |
| 6 | Marlies Oester | Switzerland | 40 | 40 |
| 7 | Michaela Dorfmeister | Austria | 36 | 36 |
| 8 | Caroline Lalive | United States | 32 | 32 |
| 9 | Jessica Lindell-Vikarby | Sweden | 29 | 29 |
| 10 | Šárka Záhrobská | Czech Republic | 29 | 29 |
