= 2002 Alpine Skiing World Cup – Men's combined =

2002 Men's combined World Cup
Previous: 2001	Next: 2003

Men's combined World Cup 2001/2002

== Final point standings ==
In men's combined World Cup 2001/02 both results count.

Place	Name	Country	Total points	20 (Germany)	24 (Austria)
1	Kjetil André Aamodt	Norway	200	100	100
2	Lasse Kjus	Norway	140	60	80
3	Andrej Jerman	Slovenia	82	32	50
4	Bode Miller	United States	80	80	-
5	Michael Walchhofer	Austria	60	-	60
6	Kurt Sulzenbacher	Italy	58	26	32
7	Didier Défago	Switzerland	50	50	-
8	Gaetan Llorach	France	45	45	-
	Paul Accola	Switzerland	45	-	45
10	Stanley Hayer	Czech Republic	40	40	-
	Stein Kristian Strand	Norway	40	-	40
12	Matteo Nana	Italy	36	36	-
	Kristian Ghedina	Italy	36	-	36
14	Antoine Dénériaz	France	29	29	-

Alpine Skiing World Cup
Men

Overall | Downhill | Super G | Giant slalom | Slalom | Combined

2002
