= 2003 Alpine Skiing World Cup – Men's combined =

2003 Men's combined World Cup
Previous: 2002	Next: 2004

Men's combined World Cup 2002/2003

== Final point standings ==
In men's combined World Cup 2002/03 both results count.

Place	Name	Country	Total points	23 (Switzerland)	26 (Austria)
1	Bode Miller	United States	125	80	45
2	Kjetil André Aamodt	Norway	100	100	-
	Michael Walchhofer	Austria	100	-	100
4	Aksel Lund Svindal	Norway	80	-	80
5	Ambrosi Hoffmann	Switzerland	72	36	36
	Bruno Kernen	Switzerland	72	40	32
7	Lasse Kjus	Norway	60	60	-
	Didier Défago	Switzerland	60	-	60
9	Gaetan Llorach	France	50	50	-
	Christoph Gruber	Austria	50	-	50
11	Andrej Jerman	Slovenia	45	45	-
12	Stephan Eberharter	Austria	40	-	40
13	Scott Macartney	United States	32	32	-
14	Michal Rajčan	Slovakia	29	29	-
	Marco Büchel	Liechtenstein	29	-	29

Note:

In both events not all points were awarded (not enough starters/finishers).

Alpine Skiing World Cup
Men

Overall | Downhill | Super G | Giant slalom | Slalom | Combined

2003
