= Denise Karbon =

Italian alpine skier

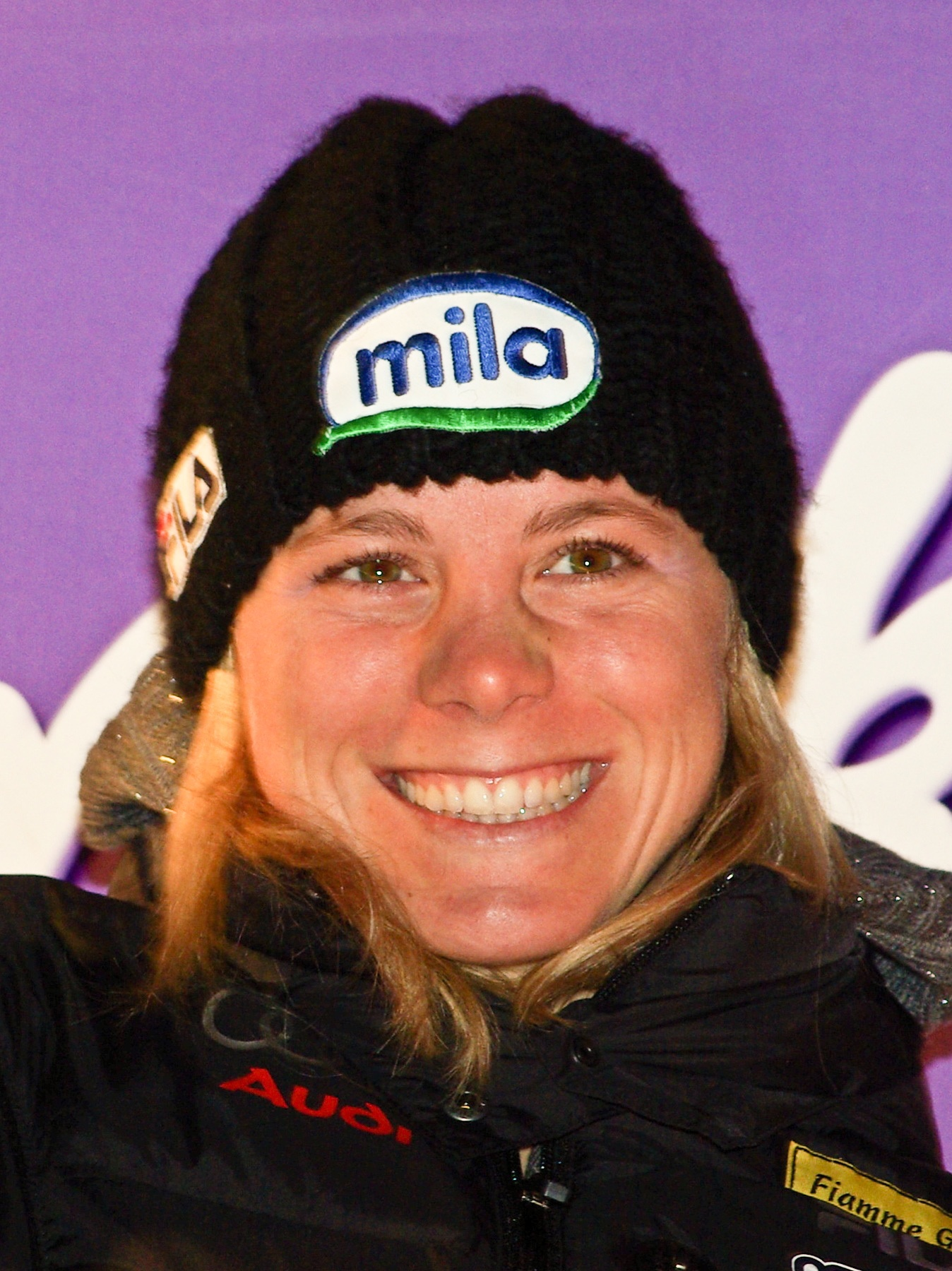
- Karbon in December 2008

Personal information
- Born: 16 August 1980 (age 45) Brixen, South Tyrol, Italy
- Height: 160 cm (5 ft 3 in)

Skiing career
- Sport: Alpine skiing
- Club: G.S. Fiamme Gialle
- Retired: 16 March 2014 (age 33)
- Disciplines: Giant slalom, slalom
- World Cup debut: 6 January 1998 (age 17)

Olympics
- Teams: 4 – (2002–2014)
- Medals: 0

World Championships
- Teams: 6 – (2001–2013)
- Medals: 2 (0 gold)

World Cup
- Seasons: 14 – (2000–2014)
- Wins: 6
- Podiums: 16
- Overall titles: 0 – (10th in 2008)
- Discipline titles: 1 – (GS, 2008)
Medal record
Women's alpine skiing
Representing Italy
World Cup race podiums: Event / 1st / 2nd / 3rd; Giant slalom / 6 / 4 / 6
World Championships
Silver medal – second place	2003 St. Moritz	Giant slalom
Bronze medal – third place	2007 Åre	Giant slalom

Denise Karbon (born 16 August 1980) is a retired World Cup alpine ski racer from South Tyrol, Italy. She competed in the technical events and specialized in giant slalom.

== Biography ==
Born in Brixen, South Tyrol, Karbon made her World Cup debut in 1998 at age 17, while the following year she was Junior World Champion. She won a total of six World Cup giant slaloms: in December 2003 at Alta Badia and five of the first six races in the 2008 season. She obtained ten other podiums for a total of sixteen.

Karbon won a silver medal at the 2003 World Championships in giant slalom, followed by a bronze in 2007 in the same discipline.

In the 2008 season, Karbon won 5 of the 7 giant slalom races (and took third in another) to win the GS season title with 592 points, 113 points ahead of runner-up Elisabeth Görgl. She finished tenth in the overall standings.

At age 33, Karbon retired in March 2014, after the World Cup finals in Lenzerheide.

== Personal ==
Karbon is the niece of Norbert Rier, leader of the Kastelruther Spatzen, and the cousin of fellow alpine ski racer Peter Fill.

== World Cup results ==
=== Season titles ===
Season	Discipline
2008	Giant slalom

=== Season standings ===
Season	Age	Overall	Slalom	Giant slalom	Super-G	Downhill	Combined
2000	19	41	27	18	—	—	—
2001	20	48	27	24	—	—	—
2002	21	80	42	31	—	—	—
2003	22	26	50	6	—	—	—
2004	23	23	—	2	—	—	—
2005	24	injured, out for season					
2006	25	85	—	33	—	—	—
2007	26	53	—	15	—	—	—
2008	27	10	29	1	—	—	—
2009	28	18	24	6	—	—	—
2010	29	32	44	9	—	—	—
2011	30	57	—	15	—	—	—
2012	31	53	—	14	—	—	—
2013	32	60	—	21	—	—	—
2014	33	63	—	21	—	—	—

=== Race podiums ===
- 6 wins – (6 GS)
- 16 podiums – (16 GS)

Season	Date	Location	Discipline	Race
2003	28 Dec 2002	Semmering, Austria	Giant slalom	3rd
2003	6 Mar 2003	Åre, Sweden	Giant slalom	3rd
2003	16 Mar 2003	Hafjell, Norway	Giant slalom	2nd
2004	28 Nov 2003	Park City, USA	Giant slalom	3rd
2004	13 Dec 2003	Alta Badia, Italy	Giant slalom	1st
2004	14 Mar 2004	Sestriere, Italy	Giant slalom	2nd
2007	21 Jan 2007	Cortina d'Ampezzo, Italy	Giant slalom	3rd
2008	27 Oct 2007	Sölden, Austria	Giant slalom	1st
2008	24 Nov 2007	Panorama, Canada	Giant slalom	1st
2008	28 Dec 2007	Lienz, Austria	Giant slalom	1st
2008	5 Jan 2008	Špindlerův Mlýn, Czech Rep.	Giant slalom	1st
2008	12 Jan 2008	Maribor, Slovenia	Giant slalom	3rd
2008	26 Jan 2008	Ofterschwang, Germany	Giant slalom	1st
2009	10 Jan 2009	Maribor, Slovenia	Giant slalom	2nd
2010	24 Oct 2009	Sölden, Austria	Giant slalom	3rd
2011	11 Mar 2011	Špindlerův Mlýn, Czech Rep.	Giant slalom	2nd

== World Championship results ==
Year	Age	Slalom	Giant slalom	Super-G	Downhill	Combined
2001	20	DNF1	DSQ2	—	—	—
2003	22	27	2	—	—	—
2005	24	injured, did not compete				
2007	26	—	3	—	—	—
2009	28	4	4	—	—	—
2011	30	—	4	—	—	—
2013	32	—	DNS2	—	—	—

== Olympic results ==
Year	Age	Slalom	Giant slalom	Super-G	Downhill	Combined
2002	21	DNF1	14	—	—	—
2006	25	—	DNF2	—	—	—
2010	29	18	23	—	—	—
2014	33	—	DNF2	—	—	—
