= Perathoner =

Perathoner is a surname. Notable people with the surname include:

- Alan Perathoner (born 1976), Italian alpine skier
- Christa Perathoner (born 1987), Italian biathlete
- Emanuel Perathoner (born 1986), Italian snowboarder
- Julius Perathoner (1849–1926), Austro-Hungarian-born Italian politician
- Lukas Perathoner (born 1968), Italian alpine skier
- Werner Perathoner (born 1967), Italian alpine skier
