= Michaela Dorfmeister =

Austrian alpine skier

- Michaela Dorfmeister in 2026.

Personal information
- Born: 25 March 1973 (age 53) Vienna, Austria
- Height: 1.73 m (5 ft 8 in)

Skiing career
- Sport: Alpine skiing
- Retired: 2006 (age 32)
- Disciplines: Downhill, super-G, giant slalom, combined
- World Cup debut: 21 December 1991 (age 18)

Olympics
- Teams: 3 – (1998, 2002, 2006)
- Medals: 3 (2 gold)

World Championships
- Teams: 6 – (1996–2005)
- Medals: 4 (2 gold)

World Cup
- Seasons: 15 – (1992–2006)
- Wins: 25 – (7 DH, 10 SG, 8 GS)
- Podiums: 64
- Overall titles: 1 – (2002)
- Discipline titles: 5 – (2 DH, 2 SG, 1 GS)
Medal record
Women's alpine skiing
Representing Austria
International alpine ski competitions
Event	1st	2nd	3rd
Olympic Games	2	1	0
World Championships	2	1	1
Total	4	2	1
World Cup race podiums
Event	1st	2nd	3rd
Giant	8	2	6
Super-G	10	6	10
Downhill	7	8	6
Combined	0	0	1
Total	25	16	23
Olympic Games
Gold medal – first place	2006 Turin	Downhill
Gold medal – first place	2006 Turin	Super-G
Silver medal – second place	1998 Nagano	Super-G
World Championships
Gold medal – first place	2001 St. Anton	Downhill
Gold medal – first place	2003 St. Moritz	Super-G
Silver medal – second place	1999 Vail	Downhill
Bronze medal – third place	1999 Vail	Super-G

Michaela Dorfmeister (born 25 March 1973) is an Austrian former alpine ski racer who competed in the Olympic Games and World Cup. Her specialities were both the downhill and the super-G disciplines, although she skied in and had success in giant slalom.

== Biography ==
Born in Vienna, Dorfmeister is the only daughter of a butcher by trade, and lived in Vienna until she was age six. She later studied at the Schladming ski academy, which has produced many of Austria's skiing greats.

Dorfmeister raced her first international season in 1983 and entered her first World Cup race in 1991 at Serre Chevalier coming 26. Her first podium place was in 1995 at the St. Anton downhill which she won. This was followed by a total of 25 victories (7 in downhill, 10 in super-G and 8 in giant slalom)

In 2000, she won the giant slalom World Cup, and in 2002 the overall World Cup. She won two more speciality World Cups, in 2003 (downhill) and 2005 (super-G). At the 2006 Winter Olympics, she won the gold medal in the downhill and super-G races.

Dorfmeister's win in the Hafjell super-G on 3 March 2006 made her the oldest woman to win a World Cup race.

== World Cup results ==
=== Season titles ===
Season	Discipline
2000	Giant slalom
2002	Overall
2003	Downhill
2005	Super-G
2006	Downhill
2006	Super-G

=== Season standings ===
Season	Age	Overall	Slalom	Giant Slalom	Super-G	Downhill	Combined
1992	18	103	—	—	55	47	—
1993	19	117	—	—	—	49	—
1994	20	95	—	—	44	52	—
1995	21	18	—	23	16	13	9
1996	22	9	—	12	6	8	7
1997	23	39	—	27	20	29	—
1998	24	33	—	—	16	16	20
1999	25	6	47	—	2	3	4
2000	26	2	—	1	7	7	5
2001	27	5	—	3	5	9	6
2002	28	1	—	2	3	2	2
2003	29	4	—	9	5	1	7
2004	30	6	—	10	3	5	—
2005	31	4	—	12	1	3	15
2006	32	3	—	12	1	1	14

=== Race victories ===
- 25 wins (7 DH, 10 SG, 8 GS)
- 64 podiums

Date	Location	Discipline
16 December 1995	St. Anton	Downhill
6 March 1999	St. Moritz	Super-G
4 December 1999	Serre-Chevalier	Giant slalom
9 December 1999	Val-d'Isère	Giant slalom
5 January 2000	Maribor	Giant slalom
8 January 2000	Berchtesgaden	Giant slalom
11 February 2000	Santa Caterina	Super-G
24 November 2000	Aspen	Super-G
9 December 2000	Sestriere	Giant slalom
27 October 2001	Sölden	Giant slalom
19 January 2002	Berchtesgaden	Giant slalom
31 January 2002	Åre	Giant slalom
6 March 2002	Altenmarkt	Downhill
7 March 2002	Altenmarkt	Super-G
21 December 2002	Lenzerheide	Downhill
1 March 2003	Innsbruck	Downhill
5 December 2004	Lake Louise	Super-G
6 January 2005	Santa Caterina	Downhill
16 January 2005	Cortina d'Ampezzo	Downhill
19 February 2005	Åre	Super-G
11 March 2005	Lenzerheide	Super-G
18 December 2005	Val-d'Isère	Super-G
20 January 2006	St. Moritz	Super-G
21 January 2006	St. Moritz	Downhill
3 March 2006	Hafjell	Super-G

== World Championship results ==
Year	Age	Slalom	Giant Slalom	Super-G	Downhill	Combined
1996	22	—	9	29	11	12
1997	23	—	17	8	16	12
1999	25	—	—	3	2	6
2001	27	—	8	24	1	—
2003	29	—	4	1	12	—
2005	31	—	DNF1	DNF	DNF	—

== Olympic results ==
Year	Age	Slalom	Giant Slalom	Super-G	Downhill	Combined
1998	24	—	—	2	18	—
2002	28	—	4	6	9	5
2006	32	—	—	1	1	—

Awards
Preceded by Mirna Jukić	Austrian Sportswoman of the year 2003	Succeeded by Kate Allen
Preceded by Renate Götschl	Austrian Sportswoman of the year 2006	Succeeded by Incumbent
