= 2000–01 FIS Alpine Ski World Cup =

International sports competition

FIS Alpine Ski World Cup 2000/01
| Discipline | Men | Women |
| Overall | (Austria) Hermann Maier | (Croatia) Janica Kostelić |
| Downhill | (Austria) Hermann Maier | (Italy) Isolde Kostner |
| Super-G | (Austria) Hermann Maier | (France) Régine Cavagnoud |
| Giant slalom | (Austria) Hermann Maier | (Switzerland) Sonja Nef |
| Slalom | (Austria) Benjamin Raich | (Croatia) Janica Kostelić |
| Combined | (Norway) Lasse Kjus | (Croatia) Janica Kostelić |
- Nations Cup: Austria

Competition
| Locations | 17 | 16 |
| Individual | 33 | 34 |
| Cancelled | 3 | 3 |
| Rescheduled | 5 | — |

The 35th World Cup season began in October 2000 in Sölden, Austria, and concluded in March 2001 at the World Cup finals at Åre, Sweden. The overall winners were Hermann Maier of Austria, his third, and Janica Kostelić of Croatia, her first. Maier won 13 races and had nearly twice the points of his nearest competitor, compatriot Stephan Eberharter. In the women's competition, Kostelić won nine races and won the overall by 67 points over Renate Götschl of Austria. There were no North Americans in the top ten of either competition.

A break in the schedule was for the 2001 World Championships, held in St. Anton am Arlberg, Austria, between 29 January and 10 February 2001.

== Calendar ==
=== Men ===
Event key: DH – Downhill, SL – Slalom, GS – Giant slalom, SG – Super giant slalom, KB – Combined
| Race | Season | Date | Place | Type | Winner | Second | Third |
|---|---|---|---|---|---|---|---|
| 1045 | 1 | 29 October 2000 | (Austria) Sölden | GS _{264} | (Austria) Hermann Maier | (Austria) Stephan Eberharter | (Sweden) Fredrik Nyberg |
| 1046 | 2 | 17 November 2000 | (United States) Park City | GS _{265} | (Switzerland) Michael von Grünigen | (Norway) Lasse Kjus | (Austria) Hermann Maier |
| 1047 | 3 | 19 November 2000 | (United States) Park City | SL _{304} | (Austria) Heinz Schilchegger | (Austria) Mario Matt | (Norway) Kjetil André Aamodt |
| 1048 | 4 | 25 November 2000 | (Canada) Lake Louise | DH _{306} | (Austria) Stephan Eberharter | (Switzerland) Silvano Beltrametti | (Norway) Lasse Kjus |
| 1049 | 5 | 26 November 2000 | (Canada) Lake Louise | SG _{093} | (Austria) Hermann Maier | (Norway) Lasse Kjus | (Austria) Andreas Schifferer |
| 1050 | 6 | 2 December 2000 | (United States) Beaver Creek | DH _{307} | (Austria) Hermann Maier | (Norway) Lasse Kjus | (Austria) Stephan Eberharter |
| 1051 | 7 | 3 December 2000 | (United States) Beaver Creek | SG _{094} | (Sweden) Fredrik Nyberg | (Austria) Christoph Gruber | (Norway) Kenneth Sivertsen |
| 1052 | 8 | 9 December 2000 | (France) Val d'Isère | DH _{308} | (Austria) Hermann Maier | (Austria) Stephan Eberharter | (Austria) Fritz Strobl |
| 1053 | 9 | 10 December 2000 | (France) Val d'Isère | GS _{266} | (Austria) Hermann Maier | (Austria) Heinz Schilchegger | (Austria) Andreas Schifferer |
| 1054 | 10 | 11 December 2000 | (Italy) Sestriere | SL _{305} | (Norway) Hans Petter Buraas | (Austria) Kilian Albrecht | (France) Pierrick Bourgeat |
| | | 16 December 2000 | (Italy) Val Gardena | DH _{cnx} | replaced in Val d'Isère on 16 December 2000 | | |
| 1055 | 11 | (Note: Downhill from Val Gardena was rescheduled to Val d'Isère.)16 December 2000 | (France) Val d'Isère | DH _{309} | (Italy) Alessandro Fattori | (Italy) Kristian Ghedina | (Italy) Roland Fischnaller |
| | | 17 December 2000 | (Italy) Val Gardena | GS _{cnx} | replaced in Val d'Isère on 17 December 2000 | | |
| 1056 | 12 | (Note: Giant slalom from Alta Badia was rescheduled to Val d'Isère.)17 December 2000 | (France) Val d'Isère | GS _{267} | (Switzerland) Michael von Grünigen | (Austria) Heinz Schilchegger | (United States) Bode Miller |
| 1057 | 13 | (Note: Slalom from Kranjska Gora was rescheduled to Madonna di Campiglio.)19 December 2000 | (Italy) Madonna di Campiglio | SL _{306} | (Austria) Mario Matt | (Austria) Heinz Schilchegger | (Austria) Rainer Schönfelder |
| 1058 | 14 | (Note: Giant slalom from Kranjska Gora was rescheduled to Bormio.)21 December 2000 | (Italy) Bormio | GS _{268} | (Austria) Christoph Gruber | (United States) Erik Schlopy | (Sweden) Fredrik Nyberg |
| 1059 | 15 | 6 January 2001 | (France) Les Arcs | GS _{269} | (Switzerland) Michael von Grünigen | (Austria) Benjamin Raich | (Liechtenstein) Marco Büchel |
| | | 7 January 2001 | (France) Les Arcs | SL _{cnx} | cancelled | | |
| 1060 | 16 | 9 January 2001 | (Switzerland) Adelboden | GS _{270} | (Austria) Hermann Maier | (Switzerland) Michael von Grünigen | (Sweden) Fredrik Nyberg |
| | | 13 January 2001 | (Switzerland) Wengen | DH _{cnx} | replaced in Kvitfjell on 2 March 2001 | | |
| 1061 | 17 | 14 January 2001 | (Switzerland) Wengen | SL _{307} | (Austria) Benjamin Raich | (Austria) Rainer Schönfelder | (Austria) Mario Matt |
| | | 14 January 2001 | (Switzerland) Wengen | KB _{cnx} | cancelled | | |
| 1062 | 18 | 19 January 2001 | (Austria) Kitzbühel | SG _{095} | (Austria) Hermann Maier | (Austria) Josef Strobl | (Austria) Werner Franz |
| 1063 | 19 | 20 January 2001 | (Austria) Kitzbühel | DH _{310} | (Austria) Hermann Maier | (Austria) Hannes Trinkl | (Austria) Stephan Eberharter (United States) Daron Rahlves |
| 1064 | 20 | 21 January 2001 | (Austria) Kitzbühel | SL _{308} | (Austria) Benjamin Raich | (Slovenia) Jure Košir | (Norway) Hans Petter Buraas |
| 1065 | 21 | 21 January 2001 | (Austria) Kitzbühel | KB _{080} | (Norway) Lasse Kjus | (Austria) Michael Walchhofer | (Norway) Kjetil André Aamodt |
| 1066 | 22 | 23 January 2001 | (Austria) Schladming | SL _{309} | (Austria) Benjamin Raich | (Norway) Hans Petter Buraas | (Slovenia) Mitja Kunc |
| 1067 | 23 | 27 January 2001 | (Germany) Garmisch-Partenkirchen | DH _{311} | (Austria) Fritz Strobl | (Austria) Peter Rzehak | (Switzerland) Franco Cavegn |
| 1068 | 24 | 28 January 2001 | (Germany) Garmisch-Partenkirchen | SG _{096} | (Austria) Christoph Gruber | (Austria) Hermann Maier | (Switzerland) Didier Cuche |
2001 World Championships (29 January – 10 February)
| 1069 | 25 | 15 February 2001 | (Japan) Shiga Kōgen | GS _{271} | (Austria) Hermann Maier | (Liechtenstein) Marco Büchel | (Austria) Benjamin Raich |
| 1070 | 26 | 17 February 2001 | (Japan) Shiga Kōgen | SL _{310} | (France) Pierrick Bourgeat | (Austria) Heinz Schilchegger | (Austria) Benjamin Raich |
| 1071 | 27 | 18 February 2001 | (Japan) Shiga Kōgen | SL _{311} | (France) Pierrick Bourgeat | (Austria) Heinz Schilchegger | (Slovenia) Jure Košir |
| | | 24 February 2001 | (United States) Ogden | DH _{cnx} | cancelled | | |
| | | 25 February 2001 | (United States) Ogden | SG _{cnx} | cancelled | | |
| 1072 | 28 | (Note: Downhill from Wengen was rescheduled to Kvitfjell.)2 March 2001 | (Norway) Kvitfjell | DH _{312} | (Austria) Hermann Maier | (Germany) Florian Eckert | (Norway) Lasse Kjus |
| 1073 | 29 | 3 March 2001 | (Norway) Kvitfjell | DH _{313} | (Austria) Stephan Eberharter | (Germany) Florian Eckert | (Austria) Fritz Strobl |
| 1074 | 30 | 4 March 2001 | (Norway) Kvitfjell | SG _{097} | (Austria) Hermann Maier | (Austria) Hannes Trinkl | (Austria) Stephan Eberharter |
| 1075 | 31 | 8 March 2001 | (Sweden) Åre | DH _{314} | (Austria) Hermann Maier | (Austria) Stephan Eberharter | (Norway) Kenneth Sivertsen |
| | | 9 March 2001 | (Sweden) Åre | SG _{cnx} | cancelled | | |
| 1076 | 32 | 10 March 2001 | (Sweden) Åre | GS _{272} | (Austria) Hermann Maier | (United States) Erik Schlopy | (Austria) Benjamin Raich |
| 1077 | 33 | 11 March 2001 | (Sweden) Åre | SL _{312} | (Austria) Benjamin Raich | (Austria) Mario Matt | (France) Sébastien Amiez |

=== Ladies ===
Event key: DH – Downhill, SL – Slalom, GS – Giant slalom, SG – Super giant slalom, KB – Combined
| Race | Season | Date | Place | Type | Winner | Second | Third |
|---|---|---|---|---|---|---|---|
| 977 | 1 | 28 October 2000 | (Austria) Sölden | GS _{260} | (Germany) Martina Ertl | (Norway) Andrine Flemmen | (Sweden) Anja Pärson |
| 978 | 2 | 16 November 2000 | (United States) Park City | GS _{261} | (Switzerland) Sonja Nef | (Austria) Brigitte Obermoser | (Sweden) Anja Pärson |
| 979 | 3 | 18 November 2000 | (United States) Park City | SL _{294} | (Croatia) Janica Kostelić | (Germany) Martina Ertl | (France) Christel Pascal |
| 980 | 4 | 24 November 2000 | (United States) Aspen | SG _{099} | (Austria) Michaela Dorfmeister | (France) Régine Cavagnoud | (Switzerland) Corinne Rey-Bellet |
| 981 | 5 | 25 November 2000 | (United States) Aspen | SL _{295} | (Croatia) Janica Kostelić | (Germany) Martina Ertl | (United States) Kristina Koznick |
| 982 | 6 | 30 November 2000 | (Canada) Lake Louise | DH _{256} | (Germany) Petra Haltmayr | (Italy) Isolde Kostner | (Austria) Renate Götschl |
| 983 | 7 | 1 December 2000 | (Canada) Lake Louise | DH _{257} | (Italy) Isolde Kostner | (France) Carole Montillet | (Switzerland) Corinne Rey-Bellet |
| 984 | 8 | 2 December 2000 | (Canada) Lake Louise | SG _{100} | (Austria) Renate Götschl | (France) Régine Cavagnoud | (Germany) Martina Ertl |
| 985 | 9 | 6 December 2000 | (France) Val d'Isère | SG _{101} | (France) Régine Cavagnoud | (Austria) Michaela Dorfmeister | (France) Carole Montillet |
| 986 | 10 | (Note: Sestriere replaced the giant slalom from Val d'Isère.)9 December 2000 | (Italy) Sestriere | GS _{262} | (Austria) Michaela Dorfmeister | (Sweden) Anja Pärson | (Switzerland) Sonja Nef |
| 987 | 11 | 10 December 2000 | (Italy) Sestriere | SL _{296} | (Croatia) Janica Kostelić | (United States) Sarah Schleper | (Norway) Trine Bakke |
| 988 | 12 | 16 December 2000 | (Switzerland) Sankt Moritz | DH _{258} | (Austria) Brigitte Obermoser | (Austria) Renate Götschl | (Canada) Emily Brydon |
| 989 | 13 | 17 December 2000 | (Switzerland) Sankt Moritz | DH _{259} | (Austria) Renate Götschl | (Italy) Isolde Kostner | (France) Régine Cavagnoud |
| 990 | 14 | (Note: The competitions on 19 and 20 December 2000 in Sestriere replaced the competitions planned for 20 and 21 December in Jasná, Slovakia.)19 December 2000 | (Italy) Sestriere | GS _{263} | (Switzerland) Sonja Nef | (Sweden) Anja Pärson | (Austria) Renate Götschl |
| 991 | 15 | 20 December 2000 | (Italy) Sestriere | SL _{297} | (Croatia) Janica Kostelić | (Norway) Trine Bakke | (United States) Kristina Koznick |
| 992 | 16 | 28 December 2000 | (Austria) Semmering | GS _{264} | (Switzerland) Sonja Nef | (Switzerland) Corinne Rey-Bellet | (United States) Sarah Schleper |
| 993 | 17 | 29 December 2000 | (Austria) Semmering | SL _{298} | (Croatia) Janica Kostelić | (Switzerland) Sonja Nef | (Norway) Trine Bakke |
| 994 | 18 | 6 January 2001 | (Slovenia) Maribor | GS _{265} | (Switzerland) Sonja Nef | (Italy) Karen Putzer | (Austria) Renate Götschl |
| | | 7 January 2001 | (Slovenia) Maribor | SL _{cnx} | cancelled | | |
| 995 | 19 | 13 January 2001 | (Austria) Haus | DH _{260} | (Austria) Renate Götschl | (Italy) Isolde Kostner | (Canada) Mélanie Turgeon |
| 996 | 20 | 13 January 2001 | (Austria) Haus | SG _{102} | (France) Régine Cavagnoud | (Canada) Mélanie Turgeon | (Austria) Renate Götschl |
| 997 | 21 | 14 January 2001 | (Austria) Flachau | SL _{299} | (Croatia) Janica Kostelić | (Austria) Karin Köllerer (France) Laure Péquegnot | |
| 998 | 22 | 13 January 2001; 14 January 2001 | (Austria) Haus (DH) (Austria) Flachau (SL) | KB _{069} | (Croatia) Janica Kostelić | (United States) Caroline Lalive | (Austria) Renate Götschl |
| 999 | 23 | 19 January 2001 | (Italy) Cortina d'Ampezzo | DH _{261} | (Italy) Isolde Kostner | (Austria) Renate Götschl | (France) Régine Cavagnoud |
| 1000 | 24 | 20 January 2001 | (Italy) Cortina d'Ampezzo | SG _{103} | (France) Régine Cavagnoud | (Canada) Mélanie Turgeon | (Austria) Renate Götschl |
| 1001 | 25 | 21 January 2001 | (Italy) Cortina d'Ampezzo | GS _{266} | (Switzerland) Sonja Nef | (Canada) Allison Forsyth | (Austria) Michaela Dorfmeister |
| 1002 | 26 | 26 January 2001 | (Germany) Ofterschwang | SL _{300} | (Croatia) Janica Kostelić | (United States) Kristina Koznick | (Switzerland) Sonja Nef |
| | | 27 January 2001 | (Germany) Ofterschwang | GS _{cnx} | cancelled | | |
2001 World Championships (29 January – 10 February)
| 1003 | 27 | 16 February 2001 | (Germany) Garmisch-Partenkirchen | SG _{104} | (France) Carole Montillet | (Austria) Renate Götschl | (Austria) Brigitte Obermoser |
| | | 17 February 2001 | (Germany) Garmisch-Partenkirchen | SG _{cnx} | cancelled | | |
| 1004 | 28 | 18 February 2001 | (Germany) Garmisch-Partenkirchen | SL _{301} | (Croatia) Janica Kostelić | (France) Christel Pascal | (Austria) Karin Köllerer |
| 1005 | 29 | 24 February 2001 | (Switzerland) Lenzerheide | DH _{262} | (United States) Kirsten Lee Clark | (France) Régine Cavagnoud | (Germany) Petra Haltmayr |
| 1006 | 30 | 25 February 2001 | (Switzerland) Lenzerheide | SG _{105} | (Italy) Isolde Kostner | (Austria) Renate Götschl | (France) Carole Montillet |
| 1007 | 31 | 8 March 2001 | (Sweden) Åre | DH _{263} | (Germany) Hilde Gerg | (Italy) Isolde Kostner | (Switzerland) Sylviane Berthod |
| 1008 | 32 | 9 March 2001 | (Sweden) Åre | SG _{106} | (Switzerland) Corinne Rey-Bellet | (Canada) Mélanie Turgeon | (France) Régine Cavagnoud |
| 1009 | 33 | 10 March 2001 | (Sweden) Åre | SL _{302} | (Switzerland) Sonja Nef | (Germany) Martina Ertl | (Sweden) Anja Pärson |
| 1010 | 34 | 11 March 2001 | (Sweden) Åre | GS _{267} | (Switzerland) Sonja Nef | (Sweden) Anja Pärson | (Sweden) Ylva Nowén |

== Men ==
=== Overall ===
| Place | Name | Country | Total |
|---|---|---|---|
| 1 | Hermann Maier | Austria | 1618 |
| 2 | Stephan Eberharter | Austria | 875 |
| 3 | Lasse Kjus | Norway | 866 |
| 4 | Benjamin Raich | Austria | 865 |
| 5 | Michael von Grünigen | Switzerland | 743 |
| 6 | Heinz Schilchegger | Austria | 730 |
| 7 | Kjetil André Aamodt | Norway | 668 |
| 8 | Josef Strobl | Austria | 527 |
| 9 | Fredrik Nyberg | Sweden | 475 |
| 10 | Didier Cuche | Switzerland | 473 |

=== Downhill ===
| Place | Name | Country | Total |
|---|---|---|---|
| 1 | Hermann Maier | Austria | 576 |
| 2 | Stephan Eberharter | Austria | 562 |
| 3 | Josef Strobl | Austria | 402 |
| 4 | Hannes Trinkl | Austria | 313 |
| 5 | Lasse Kjus | Norway | 301 |

=== Super G ===
| Place | Name | Country | Total |
|---|---|---|---|
| 1 | Hermann Maier | Austria | 420 |
| 2 | Christoph Gruber | Austria | 246 |
| 3 | Josef Strobl | Austria | 228 |
| 4 | Stephan Eberharter | Austria | 208 |
| 5 | Werner Franz | Austria | 182 |

=== Giant slalom ===
| Place | Name | Country | Total |
|---|---|---|---|
| 1 | Hermann Maier | Austria | 622 |
| 2 | Michael von Grünigen | Switzerland | 612 |
| 3 | Erik Schlopy | United States | 350 |
| 4 | Benjamin Raich | Austria | 320 |
| 5 | Heinz Schilchegger | Austria | 316 |

=== Slalom ===
| Place | Name | Country | Total |
|---|---|---|---|
| 1 | Benjamin Raich | Austria | 546 |
| 2 | Heinz Schilchegger | Austria | 414 |
| 3 | Mario Matt | Austria | 406 |
| 4 | Pierrick Bourgeat | France | 368 |
| 5 | Hans Petter Buraas | Norway | 340 |

=== Combined ===
| Place | Name | Country | Total |
|---|---|---|---|
| 1 | Lasse Kjus | Norway | 100 |
| 2 | Michael Walchhofer | Austria | 80 |
| 2 | Kjetil André Aamodt | Norway | 60 |
| 4 | Paul Casey Puckett | United States | 50 |
| 5 | Paul Accola | Switzerland | 45 |

== Ladies ==
=== Overall ===
| Place | Name | Country | Total |
|---|---|---|---|
| 1 | Janica Kostelić | Croatia | 1256 |
| 2 | Renate Götschl | Austria | 1189 |
| 3 | Régine Cavagnoud | France | 1105 |
| 4 | Sonja Nef | Switzerland | 1060 |
| 5 | Michaela Dorfmeister | Austria | 923 |
| 6 | Isolde Kostner | Italy | 895 |
| 7 | Martina Ertl | Germany | 776 |
| 8 | Corinne Rey-Bellet | Switzerland | 744 |
| 9 | Carole Montillet | France | 702 |
| 10 | Brigitte Obermoser | Austria | 669 |

=== Downhill ===
| Place | Name | Country | Total |
|---|---|---|---|
| 1 | Isolde Kostner | Italy | 596 |
| 2 | Renate Götschl | Austria | 465 |
| 3 | Régine Cavagnoud | France | 360 |
| 4 | Carole Montillet | France | 297 |
| 5 | Brigitte Obermoser | Austria | 295 |

=== Super G ===
| Place | Name | Country | Total |
|---|---|---|---|
| 1 | Régine Cavagnoud | France | 577 |
| 2 | Renate Götschl | Austria | 466 |
| 3 | Carole Montillet | France | 405 |
| 4 | Mélanie Turgeon | Canada | 364 |
| 5 | Michaela Dorfmeister | Austria | 332 |

=== Giant slalom ===
| Place | Name | Country | Total |
|---|---|---|---|
| 1 | Sonja Nef | Switzerland | 676 |
| 2 | Anja Pärson | Sweden | 408 |
| 3 | Michaela Dorfmeister | Austria | 341 |
| 4 | Karen Putzer | Italy | 297 |
| 5 | Corinne Rey-Bellet | Switzerland | 265 |

=== Slalom ===
| Place | Name | Country | Total |
|---|---|---|---|
| 1 | Janica Kostelić | Croatia | 824 |
| 2 | Sonja Nef | Switzerland | 384 |
| 3 | Martina Ertl | Germany | 346 |
| 4 | Karin Köllerer | Austria | 340 |
| 5 | Laure Pequegnot | France | 317 |

=== Combined ===
| Place | Name | Country | Total |
|---|---|---|---|
| 1 | Janica Kostelić | Croatia | 100 |
| 2 | Caroline Lalive | United States | 80 |
| 3 | Renate Götschl | Austria | 60 |
| 4 | Karen Putzer | Italy | 50 |
| 5 | Pia Käyhkö | Finland | 45 |
