= Andrej Jerman =

Slovenian alpine skier

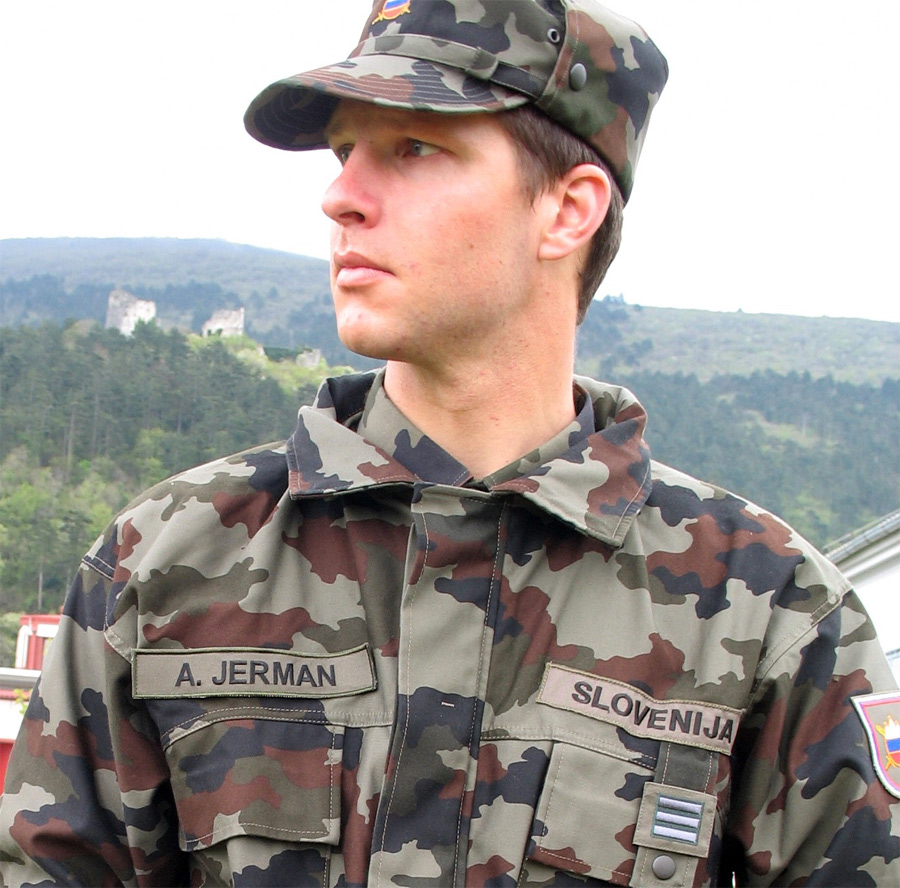
- Jerman in military uniform

Personal information
- Born: 30 September 1978 (age 47) Kranj, SFR Yugoslavia
- Height: 186 cm (6 ft 1 in)
- Website: andrejjerman.com

Skiing career
- Sport: Alpine skiing
- Club: KUT – Klub Uciteljev in Trenerjev
- Retired: 28 January 2013
- Disciplines: Downhill, Super G, Combined
- World Cup debut: 12 December 1998 (age 20)

Olympics
- Teams: 3 – (2002–10)
- Medals: 0

World Championships
- Teams: 5 – (2003–11)
- Medals: 0

World Cup
- Seasons: 12 – (2002–13)
- Wins: 2 – (2 DH)
- Podiums: 4 – (4 DH)
- Overall titles: 0 – (16th in 2008)
- Discipline titles: 0 – (6th in DH 2007)
Medal record
Men's alpine skiing
Representing Slovenia
Junior World Ski Championships
Silver medal – second place	1998 Megève	Super G

Andrej "Jerry" Jerman, (born 30 September 1978), is a retired World Cup alpine ski racer from Slovenia.

Born in Tržič, then in SFR Yugoslavia, Jerman specialized in the speed events of downhill and super G. He gained his first World Cup victory at Garmisch-Partenkirchen in February 2007 in a downhill, the first-ever for Slovenia. The next day he finished second, again in the downhill. Until then, his best World Cup result was fourth place in a downhill at Bormio, two months earlier. Jerman later gathered his second victory at Bormio, and finished his career with four World Cup podiums, all in downhill, and 27 top tens, with 18 in downhill. His best result in Super G was fourth, which came at Lake Louise in November 2007.

Jerman represented Slovenia at three Winter Olympics and five World Championships. He announced his retirement from competition in late January 2013, following a crash during the Tuesday training run at Kitzbühel. After his fall, he got up and skied down, and then collapsed unconscious in the finish area. Jerman was transferred to the hospital by helicopter, where doctors diagnosed a severe concussion. He had missed most of the previous season after breaking his shin on the Birds of Prey course at Beaver Creek in early December 2011.

== World Cup results ==
=== Race podiums ===
- 2 wins (2 DH)
- 4 podiums (4 DH)
- 27 top tens (18 DH, 4 SG, 1 SC, 4 K)

Season	Date	Location	Discipline	Place
2007	23 Feb 2007	Garmisch, Germany	Downhill	1st
2007	24 Feb 2007	Garmisch, Germany	Downhill	2nd
2008	26 Jan 2008	Chamonix, France	Downhill	3rd
2010	29 Dec 2009	Bormio, Italy	Downhill	1st

=== Season standings ===
Season	Age	Overall	Slalom	Giant Slalom	Super G	Downhill	Combined
2002	23	63	–	–	44	–	3
2003	24	52	–	–	35	28	11
2004	25	124	–	–	–	48	–
2005	26	111	–	–	–	–	11
2006	27	83	–	–	–	38	26
2007	28	24	–	–	33	6	44
2008	29	16	–	60	17	7	9
2009	30	34	–	–	23	16	51
2010	31	30	–	–	22	11	–
2011	32	45	–	–	38	18	–
2012	33	injured in 2nd downhill, no results					
2013	34	129	–	–	–	47	–

^ official season title in the Combined discipline was not awarded until the 2007 season

== Video ==
- YouTube.com – Jerman falls at Val Gardena – 19 Dec 2009
- YouTube.com – Jerman wins at Bormio – 29 Dec 2009
- YouTube.com – Jerman breaks shin at Beaver Creek – 2 Dec 2011
