= Drago Grubelnik =

Slovenian alpine skier and coach (1976–2015)

Drago Grubelnik (15 January 1976 – 17 November 2015) was a Slovenian alpine skier and coach.

Born in Radlje ob Dravi, Grubelnik made the podium in one event on the Alpine Skiing World Cup, a third place in slalom in Wengen, Switzerland (January 2000). He competed at the 1998, 2002 and 2006 Winter Olympics. He retired from competitive sport in 2007. Prior to his death in November 2015, Grubelnik was the head coach of the Bulgarian ski team.

Grubelnik died in a car accident in Sölden. He was 39.

== World Cup results ==
=== Season standings ===
Season	Age	Overall	Slalom	Giant slalom	Super-G	Downhill	Combined
1997	20	110	46	54	—	—	—
1998	21	130	54	—	—	—	—
1999	22	43	17	41	—	—	—
2000	23	68	28	—	—	—	—
2001	24	93	31	—	—	—	—
2002	25	47	14	—	—	—	—
2003	26	74	29	—	—	—	—
2004	27	54	19	—	—	—	—
2005	28	113	44	—	—	—	—
2006	29	110	48	—	—	—	—

=== Race podiums ===
Season	Date	Location	Discipline	Position
2000	16 January 2000	Wengen, Switzerland	Slalom	3rd
