= Manfred Pranger =

Austrian alpine skier (born 1978)

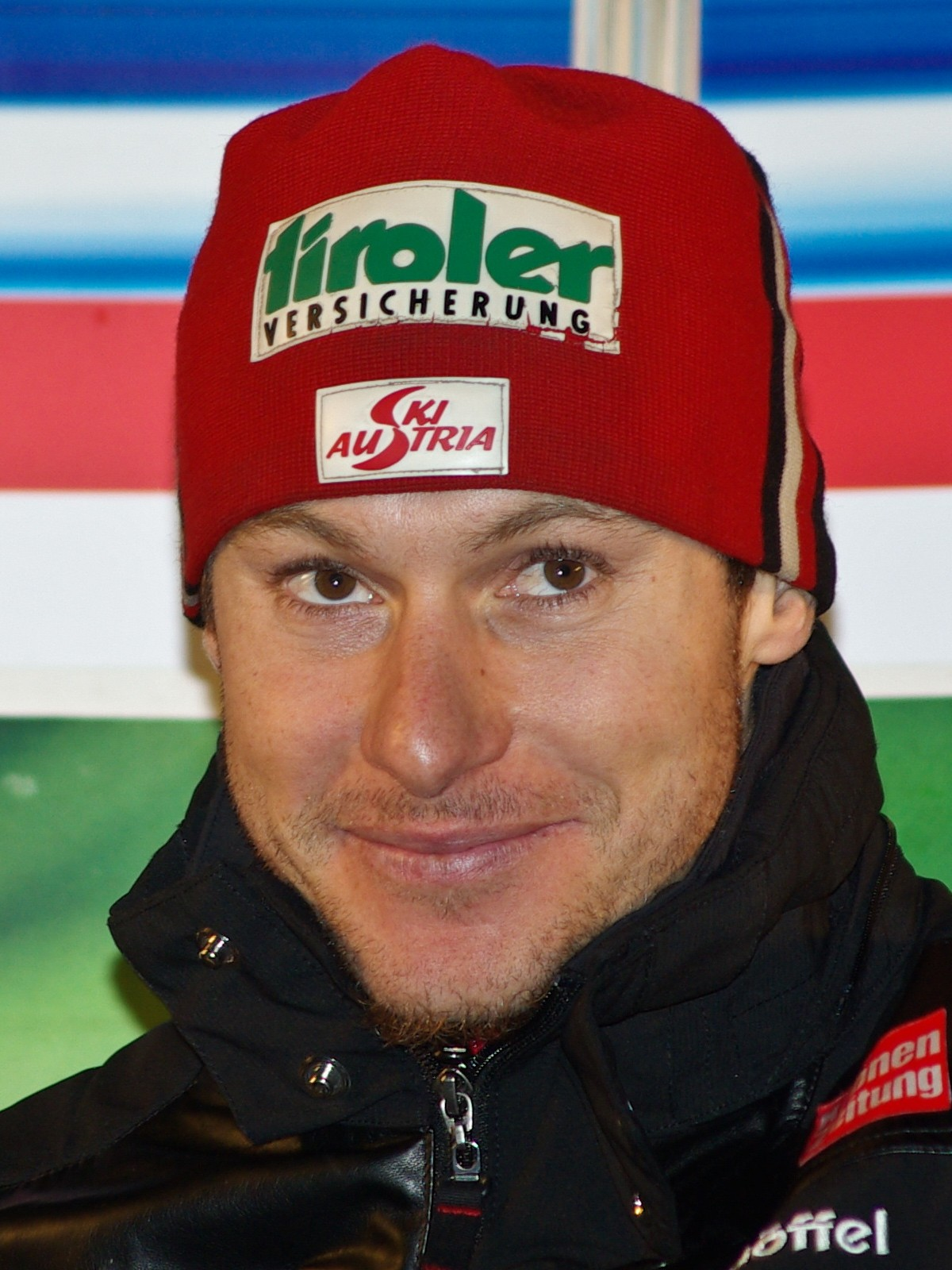
- Manfred Pranger, Schladming 2009

Personal information
- Born: 25 January 1978 (age 48) Hall in Tirol, Tyrol, Austria
- Height: 1.84 m (6 ft 1/2 in)
- Website: pranger.cc

Skiing career
- Sport: Alpine skiing
- Club: SK Gschnitz - Tirol
- Retired: May 2014
- Disciplines: Slalom
- World Cup debut: 11 December 2000 (age 22)

Olympics
- Teams: 2 – (2002, 2010)
- Medals: 0

World Championships
- Teams: 6 – (2003–2013)
- Medals: 1 (1 gold)

World Cup
- Seasons: 14 – (2001–2014)
- Wins: 3 – (3 SL)
- Podiums: 13
- Overall titles: 0
- Discipline titles: 0
Medal record
World Championships
| Gold medal – first place | 2009 Val-d'Isère | Slalom |

Manfred Pranger (born 25 January 1978) is an Austrian former alpine skier.

He won the gold medal in Slalom at the 2009 Alpine Skiing World Championship in Val d'Isère. He also won three Slalom races in the Alpine World Cup.

Pranger announced his retirement from competition in May 2014 after not being selected for the Austrian squad for the 2014 Winter Olympics.

== World cup podiums ==
- 3 wins – (3 Slalom)
- 13 podiums – (13 Slalom)

| Season | Date | Location | Discipline | Place |
|---|---|---|---|---|
| 2003 | 16 Mar 2003 | Lillehammer, Norway | Slalom | 3rd |
| 2004 | 23 Nov 2003 | Park City, United States | Slalom | 3rd |
| 2004 | 15 Dec 2003 | Madonna di Campiglio, Italy | Slalom | 3rd |
| 2004 | 4 Jan 2004 | Flachau, Austria | Slalom | 2nd |
| 2004 | 14 Mar 2004 | Sestriere, Italy | Slalom | 3rd |
| 2005 | 23 Jan 2005 | Kitzbühel, Austria | Slalom | 1st |
| 2005 | 25 Jan 2005 | Schladming, Austria | Slalom | 1st |
| 2009 | 11 Jan 2009 | Adelboden, Switzerland | Slalom | 2nd |
| 2009 | 18 Jan 2009 | Wengen, Switzerland | Slalom | 1st |
| 2009 | 27 Jan 2009 | Schladming, Austria | Slalom | 2nd |
| 2010 | 21 Dec 2009 | Alta Badia, Italy | Slalom | 3rd |
| 2010 | 26 Jan 2010 | Schladming, Austria | Slalom | 3rd |
| 2010 | 13 Mar 2010 | Garmisch, Germany | Slalom | 2nd |

== Season standings ==
| Season | Age | Overall | Slalom | Giant Slalom | Super G | Downhill | Combined |
|---|---|---|---|---|---|---|---|
| 2001 | 23 | 115 | 45 | — | — | — | — |
| 2002 | 24 | 48 | 15 | — | — | — | — |
| 2003 | 25 | 24 | 5 | — | — | — | — |
| 2004 | 26 | 25 | 7 | — | — | — | — |
| 2005 | 27 | 20 | 3 | — | — | — | — |
| 2006 | 28 | 63 | 23 | — | — | — | — |
| 2007 | 29 | 40 | 12 | — | — | — | — |
| 2008 | 30 | 86 | 31 | — | — | — | — |
| 2009 | 31 | 21 | 4 | — | — | — | — |
| 2010 | 32 | 24 | 7 | — | — | — | — |
| 2011 | 33 | 50 | 18 | — | — | — | — |
| 2012 | 34 | 39 | 10 | — | — | — | — |
| 2013 | 35 | 37 | 13 | — | — | — | — |
| 2014 | 36 | 90 | 33 | — | — | — | — |
