= Rene Mlekuž =

Slovenian alpine skier (born 1975)

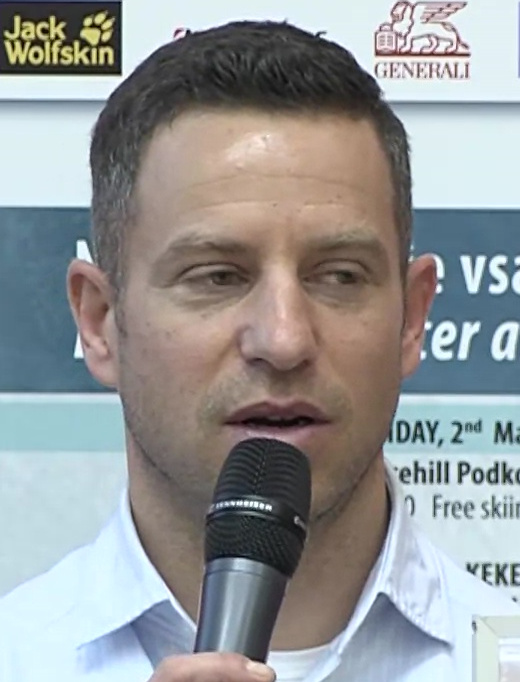
Rene Mlekuž in 2018

Rene Mlekuž (born 25 August 1975 in Slovenska Bistrica) is a Slovenian former alpine skier who competed in the 2002 Winter Olympics.

== World Cup results ==
=== Season standings ===
Season	Age	Overall	Slalom	Giant slalom	Super-G	Downhill	Combined
1996	20	67	23	—	—	—	—
1997	21	60	23	49	—	—	—
1998	22	100	40	—	—	—	—
1999	23	—	—	—	—	—	—
2000	24	—	—	—	—	—	—
2001	25	72	25	—	—	—	—
2002	26	73	25	—	—	—	—
2003	27	82	32	—	—	—	—
2004	28	108	47	—	—	—	—

=== Race podiums ===
Season	Date	Location	Discipline	Position
1996	20 January 1996	Veysonnaz, Switzerland	Slalom	2nd
