= Jeff Piccard =

French alpine skier (born 1976)

Jeff Piccard (born 1976) is a retired French alpine skier.

He competed in two events at the 1996 Junior World Championships, winning the giant slalom bronze medal. He later competed at the 2001 World Championships, but failed to finish the giant slalom race.

He made his World Cup debut in November 1996 in Park City, also collecting his first World Cup points with an 11th place. Though he often failed to finish his races, he became a prolific World Cup competitor. In the year 2001 he finished six times in the 15th–26th range, later coming close to his debut race, when finishing 12th in the December 2002 Val d'Isere giant slalom. His last World Cup outing came in December 2004 in Beaver Creek.

He represented the sports club SC Saisies.
