= Monika Bergmann =

West German sprint canoer

Medal record

Women's canoe sprint

World Championships
Bronze medal – third place	1970 Copenhagen	K-4 500 m

Monika Bergmann is a West German sprint canoer who competed in the early 1970s. She won a bronze medal in the K-4 500 m event at the 1970 ICF Canoe Sprint World Championships in Copenhagen.
