= Mitja Dragšič =

Slovenian alpine skier (born 1979)

Mitja Dragšič (born July 21, 1979 in Maribor) is a Slovenian alpine skier, specialized in slalom.

Dragšič represented Slovenia at the 2002 and 2010 Winter Olympics. His best result in the Alpine skiing World Cup are two 4th places, both in slalom.
