= Julien Cousineau =

Canadian alpine skier (born 1981)

Personal information
- Nationality: Canadian
- Born: 17 January 1981 (age 44)

Sport
- Sport: Alpine skiing

Julien "Cousi" Cousineau (born January 17, 1981) is a Canadian alpine skier. He is competed in the 2010 Winter Olympics.

Cousineau began his career in 1998.

He was named Alpine Canada's 2003 Breakthrough Male Athlete of the Year.

He resides in Lachute, Quebec, Canada where he works as a councillor when not skiing.
