= Tom Rothrock (alpine skier) =

American alpine skier (born 1978)

Tom Rothrock (born May 29, 1978 Ellensburg, Washington) is an American former alpine skier who competed in the 2002 Winter Olympics.
