= Jean-Philippe Roy =

Canadian alpine skier (born 1979)

Jean-Philippe Roy (born February 18, 1979, in Sainte-Flavie, Quebec) is a Canadian alpine skier.

Roy's best finish on the World Cup circuit is a 5th place in a giant slalom in Alta Badia. Roy also has two top-ten finishes at the World Alpine Ski Championships, finishing 8th in the 2001 combined and 7th in the 2007 giant slalom.

Roy has competed in two Olympic games: 2002 in Salt Lake and 2006 in Turin. Of the five events he has competed in at these Games, he has finished only one; he did not finish the first run of the slalom in either Games, and faced the same fate in the second run of his two giant slalom attempts. His one finish came in the 2002 combined, when he ended up 8th.
