= Brigitte Obermoser =

Austrian alpine skier (born 1976)

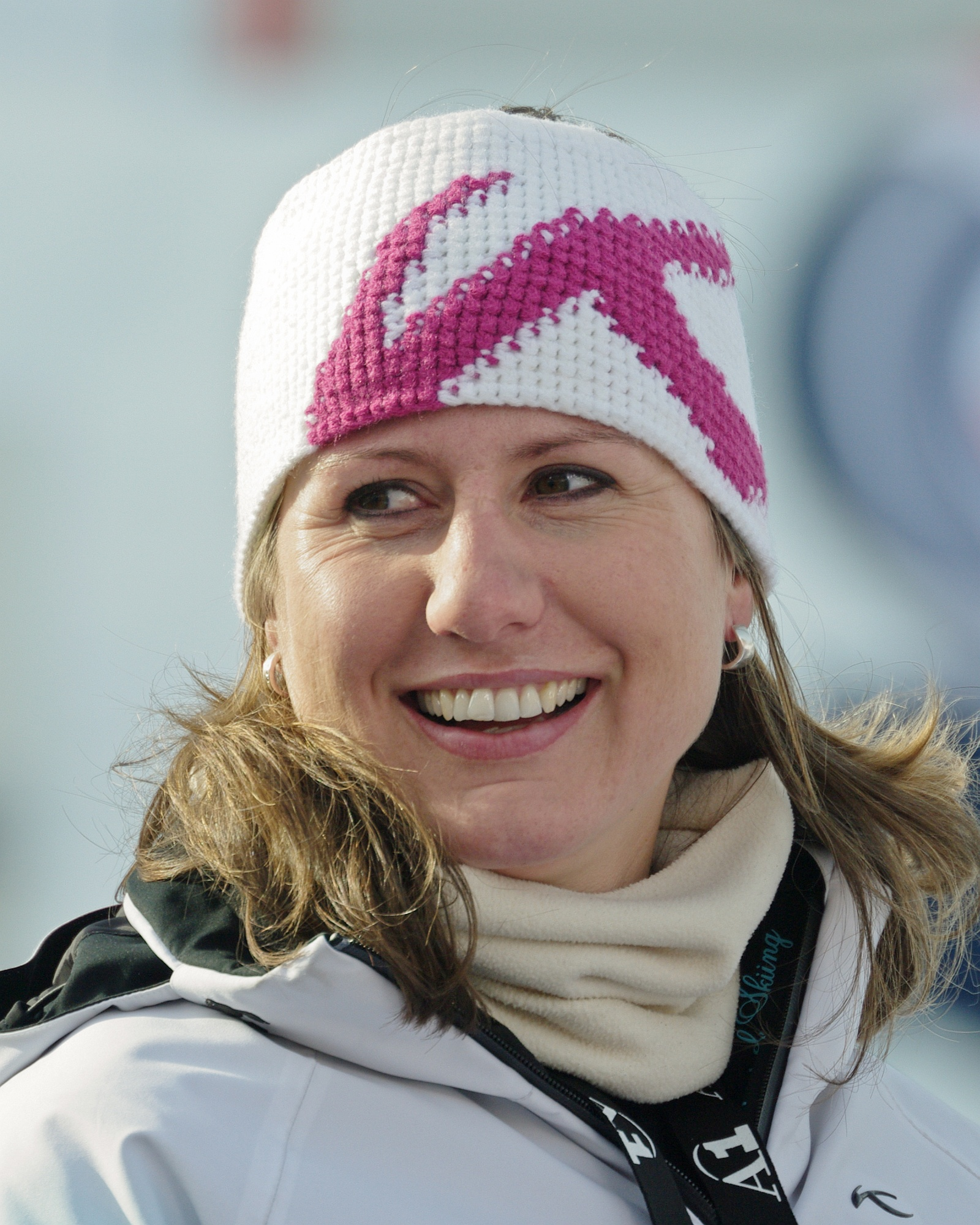
Brigitte Obermoser in 2011

Brigitte Obermoser (born 2 July 1976 in Radstadt) is an Austrian former alpine skier who competed in the 1998 Winter Olympics and 2002 Winter Olympics.
