= FIS Alpine World Ski Championships 2003 =

Skiing event in St. Moritz, Switzerland

Coordinates: 46.506°N 9.787°E

37th FIS Alpine World Ski Championships
- Host city: St. Moritz, Switzerland
- Events: 10
- Opening: 2 February 2003
- Closing: 16 February 2003
- Opened by: Pascal Couchepin

Location of Piz Nair in Switzerland
Location of Piz Nair in the Alps of Europe

The FIS Alpine World Ski Championships 2003 were held in St. Moritz, Switzerland, at Piz Nair from February 2–16, 2003.

St. Moritz previously hosted the world championships in 1974, as well as the 1948 Winter Olympics and the 1928 Winter Olympics (no alpine skiing).

== Men's events ==
=== Men's downhill ===
Date: February 8

Placing	Country	Athlete	Time
1	Austria	Michael Walchhofer	1:43.54
2	Norway	Kjetil André Aamodt	1:44.05
3	Switzerland	Bruno Kernen	1:44.51

=== Men's super-G ===
Date: February 2

Placing	Country	Athlete	Time
1	Austria	Stephan Eberharter	1:38.80
2	Austria	Hermann Maier	1:39.57
	United States	Bode Miller	1:39.57

=== Men's giant slalom ===
Date: February 12

Placing	Country	Athlete	Time	Run 1	Run 2
1	United States	Bode Miller	2:45.93	1:19.63	1:26.30
2	Austria	Hans Knauß	2:45.96	1:18.76	1:27.20
3	United States	Erik Schlopy	2:45.97	1:20.68	1:25.29

=== Men's slalom ===
Date: February 16

Placing	Country	Athlete	Time	Run 1	Run 2
1	Croatia	Ivica Kostelić	1:40.66	50.81	49.85
2	Switzerland	Silvan Zurbriggen	1:40.99	51.53	49.46
3	Italy	Giorgio Rocca	1:41.02	51.15	49.87

=== Men's combination ===
Date: February 6

Placing	Country	Athlete	Time	Downhill	Slalom
1	United States	Bode Miller	3:18.41	1:52,11	1:26.30
2	Norway	Lasse Kjus	3:18.48	1:49.16	1:29.32
3	Norway	Kjetil André Aamodt	3:18.54	1:50.50	1:28.04

== Women's events ==
=== Women's downhill ===
Date: February 9

Placing	Country	Athlete	Time
1	Canada	Mélanie Turgeon	1:34.30
2	Switzerland	Corinne Rey-Bellet	1:34.41
	Austria	Alexandra Meissnitzer	1:34.41

=== Women's super-G ===
Date: February 3

Placing	Country	Athlete	Time
1	Austria	Michaela Dorfmeister	1:27.48
2	United States	Kirsten Lee Clark	1:27.50
3	United States	Jonna Mendes	1:27.63

=== Women's giant slalom ===
Date: February 13

Placing	Country	Athlete	Time	Run 1	Run 2
1	Sweden	Anja Pärson	2:30.97	1:19.21	1:11.76
2	Italy	Denise Karbon	2:32.52	1:20.08	1:12.44
3	Canada	Allison Forsyth	2:32.76	1:19.33	1:13.43

=== Women's slalom ===
Date: February 15

Placing	Country	Athlete	Time	Run 1	Run 2
1	Croatia	Janica Kostelić	1:39.55	49.32	50.23
2	Austria	Marlies Schild	1:40.18	49.72	50.46
3	Austria	Nicole Hosp	1:40.46	49.77	50.69

=== Women's combination ===
Date: February 10

Placing	Country	Athlete	Time	Downhill	Slalom
1	Croatia	Janica Kostelić	2:41.63	1:18.81	1:22.82
2	Austria	Nicole Hosp	2:41.69	1:18.25	1:23.44
3	Switzerland	Marlies Oester	2:43.83	1:19.48	1:24.35

== Medal table ==
Place	Nation	Gold	Silver	Bronze	Total
1	Austria	3	5	1	9
2	Croatia	3	-	-	3
3	United States	2	2	2	6
4	Canada	1	-	1	2
5	Sweden	1	-	-	1
6	Switzerland	-	2	2	4
7	Norway	-	2	1	3
8	Italy	-	1	1	2

== Course information ==
Course Information – (metric)
Date	Race	Start Elevation	Finish Elevation	Vertical Drop	Course Length	Average Gradient
Fri 08-Feb	Downhill – men	2840 m	2040 m	800 m	2.989 km	26.8%
Sat 09-Feb	Downhill – women	2745	2040	705	2.719	25.9
Wed 06-Feb	Downhill – (K) – men	2745	2040	705	2.828	24.9
Sun 10-Feb	Downhill – (K) – women	2590	2040	550	2.583	21.3
Sat 02-Feb	Super-G – men	2645	2040	605	2.358	25.7
Sun 03-Feb	Super-G – women	2590	2040	550	2.118	26.0
Tue 12-Feb	Giant Slalom – men	2485	2040	445
Wed 13-Feb	Giant Slalom – women	2435	2040	395
Sat 16-Feb	Slalom – men	2220	2040	180
Fri 15-Feb	Slalom – women	2205	2040	165
Wed 06-Feb	Slalom – (K) – men	2205	2040	165
Sun 10-Feb	Slalom – (K) – women	2205	2040	165

Course Information – (imperial)
Date	Race	Start Elevation	Finish Elevation	Vertical Drop	Course Length	Average Gradient
Fri 08-Feb	Downhill – men	9318 ft	6693 ft	2625 ft	1.854 mi.	26.8%
Sat 09-Feb	Downhill – women	9006	6693	2313	1.690	25.9
Wed 06-Feb	Downhill – (K) – men	9006	6693	2313	1.757	24.9
Sun 10-Feb	Downhill – (K) – women	8497	6693	1804	1.605	21.3
Sat 02-Feb	Super-G – men	8678	6693	1985	1.465	25.7
Sun 03-Feb	Super-G – women	8497	6693	1804	1.316	26.0
Tue 12-Feb	Giant Slalom – men	8153	6693	1460
Wed 13-Feb	Giant Slalom – women	7989	6693	1296
Sat 16-Feb	Slalom – men	7283	6693	590
Fri 15-Feb	Slalom – women	7234	6693	541
Wed 06-Feb	Slalom – (K) – men	7234	6693	541
Sun 10-Feb	Slalom – (K) – women	7234	6693	541
