= Martin Marinac =

Austrian alpine skier (born 1979)

Martin Marinac (born 15 July 1979) is a retired Austrian alpine skier.

He made his World Cup debut in January 2002 in Kitzbühel, also collecting his first World Cup points with a 10th place. His career best was a 6th place in January 2003 in Schladming, Marinac remaining a consistent top-25 finisher throughout his career. He only finished below the top 25 once, in his penultimate World Cup race. His last World Cup outing came in December 2006 in Alta Badia.
