= Florian Seer =

Austrian alpine skier (born 1976)

Florian Seer (born 1976) is a retired Austrian alpine skier.

He won the gold medal in slalom at the 1995 Junior World Championships. He made his World Cup debut in December 1996 in Madonna di Campiglio. Several years later he collected his first World Cup points, finishing 21st in a Todtnau slalom. He found consistent form in 2000–01 and improved to a 9th place in November 2000 in Park City, a 5th place in December 2000 in Sestriere and 4th place in January 2001 in Wengen. Seer remained a consistent top-25 finisher until January 2003. His last World Cup outing came in January 2004 in Kitzbühel.

He represented the sports club SC Elsbethen/Salzburg.
