= Erik Schlopy =

American alpine skier

Personal information
- Born: August 21, 1972 (age 53) Buffalo, New York, U.S.
- Spouse: Summer Sanders

Skiing career
- Sport: Alpine skiing
- Retired: 2008 (age 35)
- Disciplines: Giant slalom, slalom, super-G
- World Cup debut: December 5, 1992 (age 20)

Olympics
- Teams: 3 – (1994, 2002, 2006)
- Medals: 0

World Championships
- Teams: 3 – (2001, 2003, 2005)
- Medals: 1 (0 gold)

World Cup
- Wins: 0
- Podiums: 2 – (2 GS)
- Overall titles: 0 – (15th in 2001)
- Discipline titles: 0 – (3rd in GS, 2001)
Medal record
Men's alpine skiing
Representing the United States
World Championships
Bronze medal – third place	2003 St. Moritz	Giant slalom

Erik Schlopy (born August 21, 1972) is former World Cup alpine ski racer from the United States and specialized in the technical events of giant slalom and slalom.

Born in Buffalo, New York and raised in nearby Hamburg, Schlopy competed in three Olympics: 1994, 2002, and 2006. In 1994 at Lillehammer, he placed 34th in giant slalom. At the 2002 Olympics in Salt Lake City, he was thirteenth in the slalom, and was thirteenth in the giant slalom in 2006. He competed in three World Championships, and won a bronze medal in the giant slalom in 2003.

Schlopy made his World Cup debut at age twenty in December 1992, scoring points in 24th place in a super-G at Val-d'Isère, France. His two career World Cup podiums came during his best season in 2001; he finished third in the giant slalom season standings and fifteenth overall. He won seven U.S. national championship titles and was a member of the U.S. Ski Team for fourteen seasons.

Schlopy was a youngster when he started skiing at Kissing Bridge Ski Area near Buffalo, and when his family moved to Stowe, Vermont, he became a force in junior racing with the Mount Mansfield Ski Club. He attended Burke Mountain Academy and was Eastern junior champ at 14, J1 slalom and GS champ at 16, and joined the U.S. Ski Team at 18. Schlopy left the World Cup after the 1995 season to race pro, then decided to return to the World Cup and paid for his training and racing in Winter 1999, and was named to the 2000 Ski Team.

Schlopy retired from competition in 2008. He subsequently became a coach, and in August 2013 it was announced that he had joined the US national ski team as assistant coach to the men's alpine technical team, serving under Bernd Brunner.

== World Cup results ==
=== Season standings ===
Season	Age	Overall	Slalom	Giant slalom	Super-G	Downhill	Combined	Parallel
1993	20	137	—	—	58	—	—	—N/a
1994	21	122	43	—	—	—	—	—N/a
2000	27	76	41	38	—	—	—	—N/a
2001	28	15	22	3	—	—	—	—N/a
2002	29	63	37	34	—	—	—	—N/a
2003	30	29	20	12	49	—	—	—N/a
2005	32	54	51	16	—	—	—	—N/a
2006	33	46	62	15	—	—	—	—N/a
2008	35	107	—	39	—	—	—	—N/a

=== Race podiums ===
- 0 wins
- 2 podiums (2 GS); 18 top tens

Season	Date	Location	Discipline	Place
2001	21 Dec 2000	Bormio, Italy	Giant slalom	2nd
2001	10 Mar 2001	Åre, Sweden	Giant slalom	2nd

== World Championship results ==
Year	Age	Slalom	Giant slalom	Super-G	Downhill	Combined	Parallel	Team event
2001	28	21	DNF1	—	—	—	—N/a	
2003	30	15	3	—	—	—	—N/a	
2005	32	DNF1	17	—	—	—	—N/a	

== Olympic results ==
Year	Age	Slalom	Giant slalom	Super-G	Downhill	Combined	Team event
1994	21	DNF1	34	—	—	—	—N/a
2002	29	13	DNS2	—	—	—	—N/a
2006	33	—	13	—	—	—	—N/a

== Personal life ==
Schlopy is married to former Olympic swimmer Summer Sanders; they have two children. They are both Buffalo Bills fans. Freestyle skier Alex Schlopy is Erik's cousin and is the son of Erik's cousin Todd Schlopy, a former NFL placekicker for the Buffalo Bills in 1987.
