= Marco Casanova =

Swiss alpine skier (born 1976)

Marco Casanova (born 7 June 1976 in Chur) is a Swiss former alpine skier who competed in the men's slalom at the 1998 Winter Olympics.
