= Alan Perathoner =

Italian alpine skier (born 1976)

Personal information
- Born: 2 July 1976 (age 50) Sëlva, Italy
- Height: 1.82 m (6 ft 0 in)

Skiing career
- Sport: Alpine skiing
- Club: G.S. Fiamme Oro
- Retired: 2005
- Disciplines: Slalom

Olympics
- Teams: 1

Alan Perathoner (born 2 July 1976) is an Italian former alpine skier who competed in the 2002 Winter Olympics.
