= Hans Petter Buraas =

Norwegian alpine skier (born 1975)

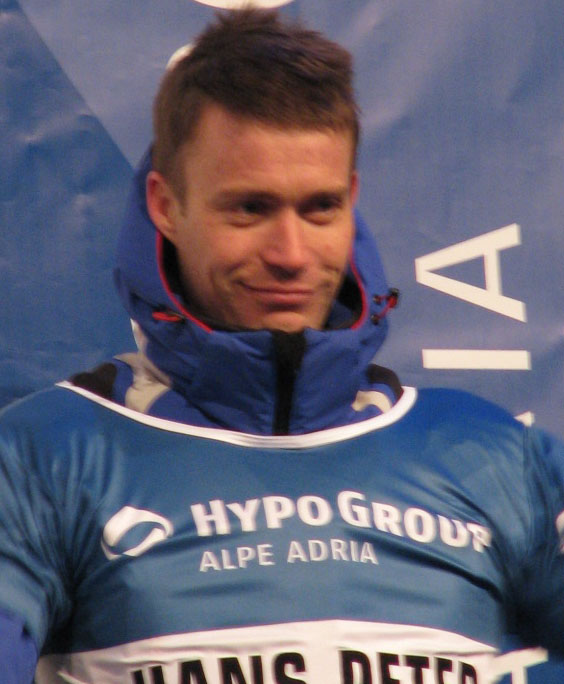
Medal record
Men's alpine skiing
Representing Norway
Olympic Games
Gold medal – first place	1998 Nagano	Slalom

Hans Petter Buraas (born 20 March 1975 in Bærum) is a Norwegian Alpine skier. He won the slalom gold medal at the 1998 Olympics in Nagano. He has raced 10 seasons in the World Cup (per 2005), and he obtained one victory in a World Cup competition.

== World Cup victories ==
Date	Location	Race
11 December 2000	(Italy) Sestriere	Slalom
