= FIS Alpine World Ski Championships 2001 =

Skiing event in St. Anton, Austria

- Host city: Sankt Anton am Arlberg
- Country: Austria
- Events: 10
- Opening: 29 January 2001
- Closing: 10 February 2001
- Opened by: Thomas Klestil

The FIS Alpine World Ski Championships 2001 were held in St. Anton, Austria, between 29 January and 10 February, 2001.

== Men's competitions ==
=== Downhill ===
Date: 7 February

Placing	Country	Athlete	Time
1	Austria	Hannes Trinkl	1:38.74
2	Austria	Hermann Maier	1:38.94
3	Germany	Florian Eckert	1:39.26

=== Super-G ===
Date: 30 January

Placing	Country	Athlete	Time
1	United States	Daron Rahlves	1:21.46
2	Austria	Stephan Eberharter	1:21.54
3	Austria	Hermann Maier	1:21.69

=== Giant Slalom ===
Date: 8 February

Placing	Country	Athlete	Time	Run 1	Run 2
1	Switzerland	Michael von Grünigen	2:23.80	1:10.94	1:12.86
2	Norway	Kjetil André Aamodt	2:24.15	1:10.58	1:13.57
3	France	Frédéric Covili	2:24.18	1:11.06	1:13.12

=== Slalom ===
Date: 10 February

Placing	Country	Athlete	Time	Run 1	Run 2
1	Austria	Mario Matt	1:39.66	50.22	49.44
2	Austria	Benjamin Raich	1:39.81	50.18	49.63
3	Slovenia	Mitja Kunc	1:40.36	51.52	48.84

=== Combination ===
Date: 5 February

Placing	Country	Athlete	Time	Slalom	Downhill
1	Norway	Kjetil André Aamodt	2:58.25	1:31.81	1:26.44
2	Austria	Mario Matt	2:58.93	1:31.95	1:26.98
3	Switzerland	Paul Accola	2:59.53	1:33.98	1:25.55

== Women's competitions ==
=== Downhill ===
Date: 6 February

Placing	Country	Athlete	Time
1	Austria	Michaela Dorfmeister	1:36.20
2	Austria	Renate Götschl	1:36.34
3	Austria	Selina Heregger	1:36.37

=== Super-G ===
Date: 29 January

Placing	Country	Athlete	Time
1	France	Régine Cavagnoud	1:23.44
2	Italy	Isolde Kostner	1:23.49
3	Germany	Hilde Gerg	1.23.52

=== Giant Slalom ===
Date: 9 February

Placing	Country	Athlete	Time	Run 1	Run 2
1	Switzerland	Sonja Nef	2:19.01	1:09.76	1:09.25
2	Italy	Karen Putzer	2:20.11	1:10.12	1:09.99
3	Sweden	Anja Pärson	2:20.52	1:11.39	1:09.13

=== Slalom ===
Date: 7 February

Placing	Country	Athlete	Time	Run 1	Run 2
1	Sweden	Anja Pärson	1:32.95	44.69	48.26
2	France	Christel Saioni	1:33.56	44.88	48.68
3	Norway	Hedda Berntsen	1:33.99	46.34	47.65

=== Combination ===
Date: 2 February

Placing	Country	Athlete	Time	Downhill	Slalom
1	Germany	Martina Ertl	2:55.65	1:27.36	1:28.29
2	Austria	Christine Sponring	2:58.23	1:27.20	1:31.03
3	Italy	Karen Putzer	2:58.69	1:27.59	1:31.10

== Medals table ==
Place	Nation	Gold	Silver	Bronze	Total
1	Austria	3	6	2	11
2	Switzerland	2	-	1	3
3	France	1	1	1	3
	Norway	1	1	1	3
5	Germany	1	-	2	3
6	Sweden	1	-	1	2
7	United States	1	-	-	1
8	Italy	-	2	1	3
9	Slovenia	-	-	1	1
