= Pierrick Bourgeat =

French alpine skier

Medal record

Men's alpine skiing

Representing France

World Championships
Bronze medal – third place	2005 Bormio	Team event

Pierrick Bourgeat (born 28 January 1976) is a retired French alpine skier.

He was born in Grenoble.

Bourgeat represented France at the 2006 Winter Olympics. He also won a bronze medal in team competition at the FIS Alpine World Ski Championships 2005.
