= Gaëtan Llorach =

French alpine skier (born 1974)

Gaëtan Llorach (born 16 January 1974 in Saint-Martin-d'Hères, Isère, France) is a former French alpine skier who competed in the 2002 Winter Olympics.

He was a member of the French Army, competing on its alpine skiing team.
