= Frédéric Covili =

French alpine skier (born 1975)

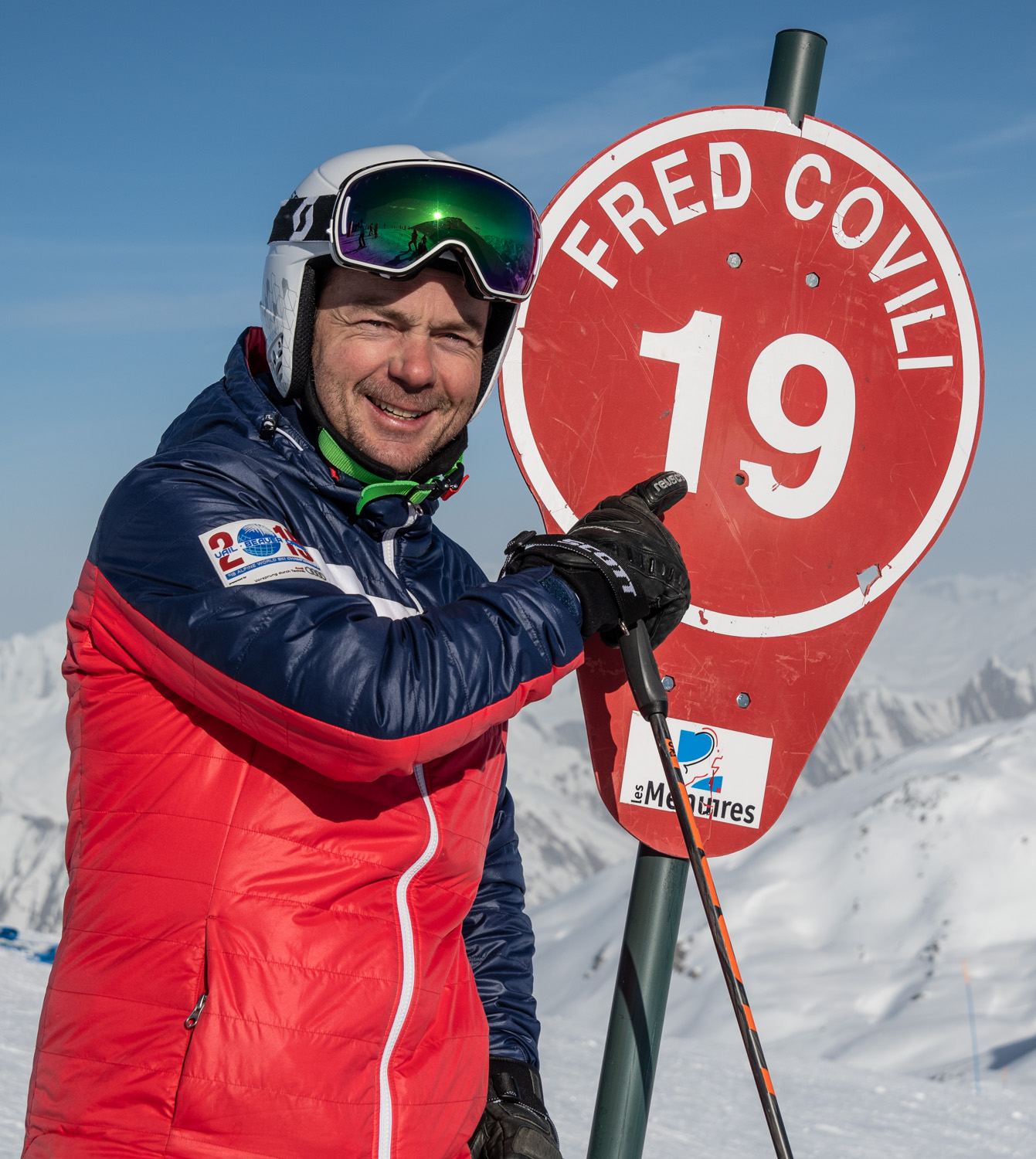

Frédéric Covili (born 14 November 1975 in Moûtiers) is a French former alpine skier who competed in the 2002 Winter Olympics.
