= Lasse Kjus =

Norwegian alpine skier

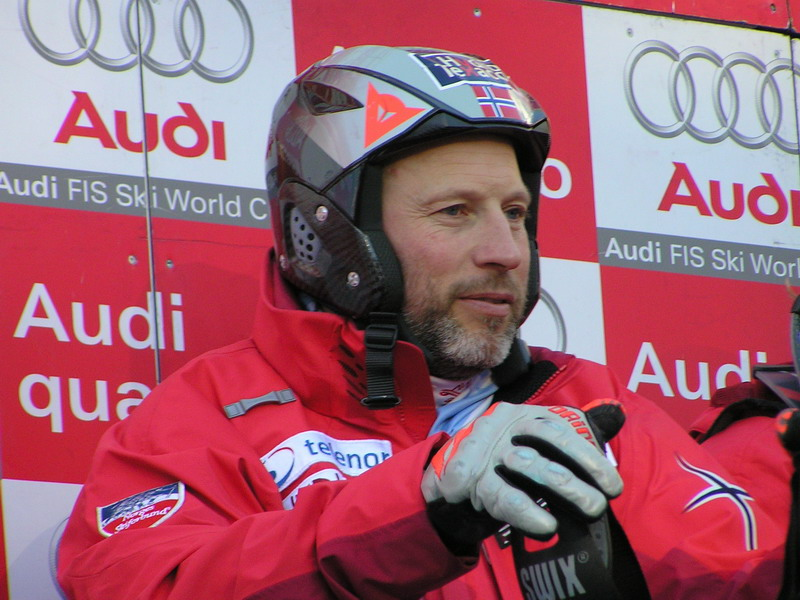
- Kjus in January 2006

Personal information
- Born: 14 January 1971 (age 55) Oslo, Norway
- Height: 1.80 m (5 ft 11 in)

Skiing career
- Sport: Alpine skiing
- Club: Bærums SK
- Retired: March 2006 (age 35)
- Disciplines: Downhill, super-G, giant slalom, slalom, combined
- World Cup debut: 14 January 1990 (age 19)

Olympics
- Teams: 4 – (1994–2006)
- Medals: 5 (1 gold)

World Championships
- Teams: 8 – (1991–2005)
- Medals: 11 (3 gold)

World Cup
- Seasons: 17 – (1990–2006)
- Wins: 18 – (10 DH, 2 SG, 2 GS, 4 K)
- Podiums: 60
- Overall titles: 2 – (1996, 1999)
- Discipline titles: 4 – (1 DH, 3 K)
Medal record
Men's alpine skiing
Representing Norway
World Cup race podiums
Event	1st	2nd	3rd
Slalom	0	0	1
Giant slalom	2	7	1
Downhill	10	7	6
Super-G	2	4	6
Combined	4	6	4
Total	18	24	18
International competitions
Event	1st	2nd	3rd
Olympic Games	1	3	1
World Championships	3	8	0
Total	4	11	1
Olympic Games
Gold medal – first place	1994 Lillehammer	Combined
Silver medal – second place	1998 Nagano	Downhill
Silver medal – second place	1998 Nagano	Combined
Silver medal – second place	2002 Salt Lake City	Downhill
Bronze medal – third place	2002 Salt Lake City	Giant slalom
World Championships
Gold medal – first place	1993 Morioka	Combined
Gold medal – first place	1999 Vail	Super-G
Gold medal – first place	1999 Vail	Giant slalom
Silver medal – second place	1996 Sierra Nevada	Combined
Silver medal – second place	1997 Sestriere	Downhill
Silver medal – second place	1997 Sestriere	Super-G
Silver medal – second place	1997 Sestriere	Giant slalom
Silver medal – second place	1999 Vail	Downhill
Silver medal – second place	1999 Vail	Slalom
Silver medal – second place	1999 Vail	Combined
Silver medal – second place	2003 St. Moritz	Combined
Junior World Ski Championships
Gold medal – first place	1990 Zinal	Giant slalom
Silver medal – second place	1990 Zinal	Downhill
Silver medal – second place	1990 Zinal	Combined
Bronze medal – third place	1990 Zinal	Super-G
Bronze medal – third place	1990 Zinal	Slalom

Lasse Kjus (born 14 January 1971) is a former World Cup alpine ski racer from Norway. He won the overall World Cup title twice, an Olympic gold medal, and several World Championships. His combined career total of 16 Olympic and World Championship medals ranks second all-time, behind fellow Norwegian Kjetil André Aamodt.

== Racing career ==
Born in Oslo, Kjus grew up in Siggerud, but represented the club Bærums SK.

In February 1999, Kjus pulled off one of the most remarkable feats in the history of alpine skiing when he medaled in all 5 events at the 1999 World Championships in Vail, Colorado. Five skiers had previously earned four medals at a single World Championship (through 1980, the Winter Olympics also served as World Championships for alpine skiing): Toni Sailer of Austria in 1956 at Cortina, and in 1958 at Bad Gastein; Marielle Goitschel of France in 1966 at Portillo, Chile; Jean-Claude Killy of France in 1968 at Grenoble; Rosi Mittermaier of Germany in 1976 at Innsbruck; and Pirmin Zurbriggen of Switzerland in 1987 at Crans-Montana; the first four did so when only four medal events were contested, but no one before, or since, has medaled in all five alpine disciplines, downhill, super-G, giant slalom, slalom, and combined, or Super-combined, at a single championship.

Kjus started off on 2 February by tying Austrian great Hermann Maier for gold in super-G. Four days later, in the downhill at nearby Beaver Creek, Kjus settled for silver, 0.31 seconds behind Maier. On 9 February, in the combined event, he narrowly missed his second gold, finishing in silver-medal position only 0.16 seconds behind compatriot Kjetil André Aamodt. With momentum building, Kjus captured gold in the giant slalom on 12 February, and then finished off his remarkable run two days later with silver in his weakest event, slalom. He had the lead after the first of two runs of slalom, but skied conservatively to assure he would win a fifth medal. He finished a scant 0.11 seconds behind Kalle Palander of Finland over two runs. Reflecting on his performance that day, and the entire fortnight, in Colorado, Kjus said, "I always try my best, but I could never have dreamed ... maybe I could have skied faster in the second run, but I didn't want to be too aggressive. I knew I could get a podium, and that's all I wanted." He missed winning all five gold medals by a combined total of slightly more than half a second (0.58 seconds). Most impressively, he performed the feat while suffering from a chest infection, which had dogged him all winter and often left him coughing and wheezing at the bottom of courses.

A particular curiosity was also his first heat in the slalom race in Wengen, Switzerland, on 17 January 1999: He got out of the starting gate, got caught with the tip of his right ski, went backwards through the first gate, but finished the heat. He finished third overall – his best World Cup slalom result ever, documented on a YouTube video

Kjus raced for 17 seasons on the World Cup circuit; his first race was in January 1990 in Alta Badia, Italy, and his last in March 2006 in Åre, Sweden. He won 18 World Cup events (10 in downhill, 2 in super-G, 2 in giant slalom and 4 combined), attained 60 podiums, and had 150 top ten finishes.

== Legacy ==
In February 2015, Kjus and Aamodt were selected as recipients of the Legends of Honor by the Vail Valley Foundation, and inducted into the International Ski Racing Hall of Fame.

== World Cup results ==
=== Season standings ===
Season	Age	Overall	Slalom	Giant slalom	Super-G	Downhill	Combined
1990	19	58	41	29	29	–	–
1991	20	9	13	11	23	33	2
1992	21	60	30	35	—	—	—
1993	22	12	19	4	37	–	9
1994	23	7	15	21	7	27	1
1995	24	6	24	9	26	9	3
1996	25	1	14	3	3	4	—
1997	26	13	32	22	6	16	2
1998	27	10	20	29	16	11	—
1999	28	1	14	14	7	1	1
2000	29	53	51	32	22	53	—
2001	30	3	23	8	8	5	1
2002	31	6	18	25	9	15	2
2003	32	31	44	35	11	37	7
2004	33	8	48	14	7	9	3
2005	34	7	53	7	22	18	2
2006	35	43	–	57	22	41	12

=== Season titles ===
2 overall, 1 downhill, 3 combined

Season	Discipline
1994	Combined
1996	Overall
1999	Overall
1999	Downhill
1999	Combined
2001	Combined

^official season title in the combined discipline
was not awarded until the 2007 season

=== Race victories ===
- 18 wins – (10 DH, 2 SG, 2 GS, 4 K)
- 60 podiums

Season	Date	Location	Discipline
1994	16 Jan 1994	Kitzbühel, Austria	Combined
1995	2 Feb 1995	Vail, USA	Super-G
1996	21 Dec 1995	Kranjska Gora, Slovenia	Giant slalom
1996	29 Dec 1995	Bormio, Italy	Downhill
1996	6 Mar 1996	Kvitfjell, Norway	Downhill
1997	26 Jan 1997	Kitzbühel, Austria	Combined
1997	2 Mar 1997	Kvitfjell, Norway	Downhill
1999	12 Dec 1998	Val-d'Isère, France	Downhill
1999	18 Dec 1998	Val Gardena, Italy	Downhill
1999	16 Jan 1999	Wengen, Switzerland	Downhill
1999	17 Jan 1999	Wengen, Switzerland	Combined
1999	22 Jan 1999	Kitzbühel, Austria	Downhill
1999	10 Mar 1999	Sierra Nevada, Spain	Downhill
2001	21 Jan 2001	Kitzbühel, Austria	Combined
2004	19 Dec 2003	Val Gardena, Italy	Super-G
2004	22 Jan 2004	Kitzbühel, Austria	Downhill
2005	4 Dec 2004	Beaver Creek, USA	Giant slalom
2005	10 Mar 2005	Lenzerheide, Switzerland	Downhill

== World Championships results ==
Year	Age	Slalom	Giant slalom	Super-G	Downhill	Combined
1991	20	10	–	–	–	–
1993	22	12	16	cancelled	–	1
1996	25	10	4	6	4	2
1997	26	–	2	2	2	5
1999	28	2	1	1	2	2
2001	30	–	7	4	DNS	—
2003	32	–	DNS2	9	13	2
2005	34	–	DNF1	11	33	6

== Olympic results ==
Year	Age	Slalom	Giant slalom	Super-G	Downhill	Combined
1992	21	—	DNF1	—	—	—
1994	23	—	7	12	18	1
1998	27	—	8	9	2	2
2002	31	—	3	DNF	2	5
2006	35	—	18	14	14	DNF SL1

== See also ==
- Alpine Ski World Cup men's race winners

Awards
Preceded by Hanne Haugland; Nils Arne Eggen	Norwegian Sportsperson of the Year; 1999	Succeeded by Trine Hattestad
