= Heinz Schilchegger =

Austrian alpine skier (born 1973)

Heinz Schilchegger (born 16 October 1973) is an Austrian former alpine skier. He was born in Radstadt.

His best result dates from 2000, when he won a World Cup slalom race in Park City, Utah.

Outside World Cup skiing he finished second in the Powder 8 World Championships in Canada in 2004.
