= 2005 Alpine Skiing World Cup – Men's downhill =

2005 Men's Downhill World Cup
Previous: 2004	Next: 2006

The 2005 Alpine Skiing World Cup – Men's downhill season involved 11 events at sites in North America and Europe between November 2004 and March 2005. Austria's Michael Walchhofer won the individual title, while his Austrian team took the team title.

== Calendar ==
Round	Race No	Place	Country	Date	Winner	Second	Third
1	2	Lake Louise	Canada	November 27, 2004	(United States) Bode Miller	(France) Antoine Dénériaz	(Austria) Michael Walchhofer
2	5	Beaver Creek	United States	December 3, 2004	(United States) Bode Miller	(United States) Daron Rahlves	(Austria) Michael Walchhofer
3	8	Val d'Isère	France	December 11, 2004	(Austria) Werner Franz	(Liechtenstein) Marco Büchel	(Austria) Michael Walchhofer
4	12	Val Gardena	Italy	December 18, 2004	(Germany) Max Rauffer	(Switzerland) Jürg Grünenfelder	(Austria) Hans Grugger
5	16	Bormio	Italy	December 29, 2004	(Austria) Hans Grugger	(Austria) Michael Walchhofer	(Austria) Fritz Strobl
6	17	Chamonix	France	January 8, 2005	(Austria) Hans Grugger	(Italy) Kristian Ghedina	(Austria) Michael Walchhofer
7	21	Wengen	Switzerland	January 15, 2005	(Austria) Michael Walchhofer	(Austria) Christoph Gruber	(United States) Bode Miller
8	26	Garmisch-Partenkirchen	Germany	February 18, 2005	(Austria) Michael Walchhofer	(Austria) Hermann Maier	(United States) Bode Miller
9	27	Garmisch-Partenkirchen	Germany	February 19, 2005	(Austria) Michael Walchhofer	(Austria) Mario Scheiber	(Austria) Fritz Strobl
10	31	Kvitfjell	Norway	March 5, 2005	(Austria) Hermann Maier	(Austria) Mario Scheiber	(Switzerland) Ambrosi Hoffmann
11	33	Lenzerheide	Switzerland	March 10, 2005	(Norway) Lasse Kjus	(United States) Bode Miller	(Austria) Fritz Strobl

== Final point standings ==
In men's downhill World Cup 2004/05 all results count.

Place	Name	Country	Total points	2 (Canada)	5 (United States)	8 (France)	12 (Italy)	16 (Italy)	17 (France)	21 (Switzerland)	26 (Germany)	27 (Germany)	31 (Norway)	33 (Switzerland)
1	Michael Walchhofer	Austria	681	60	60	60	11	80	60	100	100	100	-	50
2	Bode Miller	United States	618	100	100	50	18	18	32	60	60	50	50	80
3	Hermann Maier	Austria	451	45	29	5	-	24	32	50	80	36	100	50
4	Daron Rahlves	United States	444	50	80	36	18	40	45	-	45	45	45	40
5	Hans Grugger	Austria	418	13	22	9	60	100	100	20	50	12	14	18
6	Fritz Strobl	Austria	379	-	32	26	50	60	-	22	40	60	29	60
7	Werner Franz	Austria	254	10	-	100	20	26	12	45	26	4	11	-
8	Mario Scheiber	Austria	247	2	6	6	4	-	50	6	13	80	80	-
9	Christoph Gruber	Austria	242	-	14	14	-	29	40	80	14	15	36	-
10	Marco Büchel	Liechtenstein	237	8	24	80	12	-	6	7	-	24	40	36
11	Bruno Kernen	Switzerland	228	20	50	45	5	32	16	11	18	11	-	20
12	Kristian Ghedina	Italy	225	4	20	4	22	10	80	24	22	32	7	-
13	Kurt Sulzenbacher	Italy	200	24	26	22	26	7	26	40	-	26	3	-
14	Erik Guay	Canada	187	18	-	20	24	11	13	3	29	20	20	29
15	Didier Défago	Switzerland	185	-	12	29	15	22	5	-	36	8	26	32
16	Ambrosi Hoffmann	Switzerland	173	32	-	-	-	9	24	8	16	24	60	-
17	Antoine Dénériaz	France	168	80	18	36	29	5	-	-	-	-	-	-
18	Lasse Kjus	Norway	163	29	-	-	-	2	-	32	-	-	-	100
19	Peter Fill	Italy	159	-	18	15	-	12	11	36	20	29	18	-
20	Klaus Kröll	Austria	155	12	7	10	-	50	10	26	-	5	9	26
21	Didier Cuche	Switzerland	154	40	45	14	9	36	-	-	-	-	-	-
22	Silvan Zurbriggen	Switzerland	153	26	-	-	-	45	-	15	13	6	32	16
23	Jürg Grünenfelder	Switzerland	152	-	10	-	80	-	22	9	15	16	-	-
24	Alessandro Fattori	Italy	149	-	9	40	-	9	15	32	5	7	10	22
25	Max Rauffer	Germany	143	14	-	-	100	16	2	4	7	-	-	-
26	Benjamin Raich	Austria	117	15	4	-	-	14	-	-	24	14	22	24
27	Andreas Schifferer	Austria	107	22	6	-	-	-	-	-	32	40	7	-
28	Kjetil André Aamodt	Norway	104	6	8	3	45	-	-	18	-	-	24	-
29	Patrik Järbyn	Sweden	103	-	3	16	40	-	8	14	9	13	-	-
30	Finlay Mickel	United Kingdom	83	3	-	7	13	20	14	13	2	11	-	-
	Aksel Lund Svindal	Norway	83	16	36	-	8	-	-	11	-	-	12	-
32	Bryon Friedman	United States	79	-	40	-	36	3	-	-	-	-	-	-
33	Yannick Bertrand	France	76	-	11	8	-	-	22	2	-	18	15	-
34	Norbert Holzknecht	Austria	61	11	-	18	32	-	-	-	-	-	-	-
35	Bjarne Solbakken	Norway	51	9	18	11	1	-	-	12	-	-	-	-
36	Jeff Hume	Canada	40	-	-	-	-	-	40	-	-	-	-	-
37	Jan Hudec	Canada	36	36	-	-	-	-	-	-	-	-	-	-
	Manuel Osborne-Paradis	Canada	36	-	-	-	-	-	18	5	11	2	-	-
39	Paul Accola	Switzerland	29	-	13	2	-	13	-	-	1	-	-	-
40	Florian Eckert	Germany	23	-	-	-	2	4	-	1	6	9	1	-
41	David Poisson	France	22	-	-	-	6	-	-	-	-	-	16	-
	Pierre-Emmanuel Dalcin	France	22	-	-	-	-	-	9	-	-	-	13	-
43	Patrick Staudacher	Italy	21	-	1	2	-	-	7	-	10	1	-	-
44	Sébastien Fournier-Bidoz	France	18	-	-	12	-	6	-	-	-	-	-	-
	Tobias Grünenfelder	Switzerland	18	6	-	-	-	-	-	-	9	3	-	-
46	Nicolas Burtin	France	17	-	-	-	14	-	3	-	-	-	-	-
47	Thomas Graggaber	Austria	16	-	-	-	-	-	-	16	-	-	-	-
48	Andreas Buder	Austria	15	-	-	-	-	15	-	-	-	-	-	-
	François Bourque	Canada	15	7	-	-	-	-	-	-	-	-	8	-
50	Roland Fischnaller	Italy	13	-	-	13	-	-	-	-	-	-	-	-
51	Christoph Kronberger	Austria	10	-	-	-	10	-	-	-	-	-	-	-
52	Justin Johnson	United States	7	-	-	-	7	-	-	-	-	-	-	-
	John Kucera	Canada	7	-	-	-	-	-	-	-	3	-	4	-
54	Daniel Züger	Switzerland	6	-	2	-	-	-	4	-	-	-	-	-
55	Stefan Thanei	Italy	5	-	-	-	-	1	-	-	4	-	-	-
	Konrad Hari	Switzerland	5	-	-	-	-	-	-	-	-	-	5	-
57	Scott Macartney	United States	3	-	-	-	3	-	-	-	-	-	-	-
	Cornel Züger	Switzerland	3	-	-	-	-	-	-	-	-	-	3	-
59	A. J. Bear	Australia	1	1	-	-	-	-	-	-	-	-	-	-
	Claude Crétier	France	1	-	-	-	-	-	1	-	-	-	-	-

Note:

In the last race only the best racers were allowed to compete and only the best 15 finishers were awarded with points.

== Men's downhill team results ==
bold indicate highest score - italics indicate race wins

Place	Country	Total points	2 (Canada)	5 (United States)	8 (France)	12 (Italy)	16 (Italy)	17 (France)	21 (Switzerland)	26 (Germany)	27 (Germany)	31 (Norway)	33 (Switzerland)	Racers	Wins
1	Austria	3153	190	180	248	187	**398**	304	365	379	366	308	228	14	7
2	United States	1151	150	220	86	82	61	77	60	105	95	95	120	5	2
3	Switzerland	1106	124	132	100	109	157	71	43	108	68	126	68	11	0
4	Italy	772	28	74	96	48	39	139	132	61	95	38	22	7	0
5	Norway	401	60	62	14	54	2	-	73	-	-	36	100	4	1
6	France	324	80	29	56	49	11	35	2	-	18	44	-	7	0
7	Canada	321	61	-	20	24	11	71	8	43	22	32	29	6	0
8	Liechtenstein	237	8	24	80	12	-	6	7	-	24	40	36	1	0
9	Germany	166	14	-	-	102	20	2	5	13	9	1	-	2	1
10	Sweden	103	-	3	16	40	-	8	14	9	13	-	-	1	0
11	United Kingdom	83	3	-	7	13	20	14	13	2	11	-	-	1	0
12	Australia	1	1	-	-	-	-	-	-	-	-	-	-	1	0
