= 2006 Alpine Skiing World Cup – Men's downhill =

2006 Men's downhill World Cup
Previous: 2005	Next: 2007

The 2006 Alpine Skiing World Cup – Men's downhill season involved 10 events at sites in North America and Europe between November 2005 and March 2006. Austria's Michael Walchhofer won the individual title, while his Austrian team took the team title.

== Calendar ==
Round	Race No	Place	Country	Date	Winner	Second	Third
1	2	Lake Louise	Canada	November 26, 2005	(Austria) Fritz Strobl	(Norway) Kjetil André Aamodt	(Liechtenstein) Marco Büchel
2	5	Beaver Creek	United States	December 2, 2005	(United States) Daron Rahlves	(United States) Bode Miller	(Austria) Hans Grugger
3	8	Val d'Isère	France	December 10, 2005	(Austria) Michael Walchhofer	(Austria) Fritz Strobl	(Austria) Hans Grugger
4	12	Val Gardena	Italy	December 17, 2005	(Liechtenstein) Marco Büchel	(Austria) Michael Walchhofer	(Canada) Erik Guay
5	16	Bormio	Italy	December 29, 2005	(United States) Daron Rahlves	(Austria) Fritz Strobl	(Switzerland) Tobias Gruenenfelder
6	20	Wengen	Switzerland	January 14, 2006	(United States) Daron Rahlves	(Austria) Michael Walchhofer	(Austria) Fritz Strobl
7	23	Kitzbühel	Austria	January 21, 2006	(Austria) Michael Walchhofer	(Liechtenstein) Marco Büchel	(United States) Daron Rahlves
8	27	Garmisch	Germany	January 28, 2006	(Austria) Hermann Maier	(Austria) Klaus Kröll	(Austria) Andreas Buder
9	30	Chamonix	France	February 4, 2006	cancelled
10	35	Åre	Sweden	March 15, 2006	(Norway) Aksel Lund Svindal	(United States) Bode Miller	(Italy) Peter Fill

== Final point standings ==
In men's downhill World Cup 2005/06 all results count.

Place	Name	Country	Total points	2 (Canada)	5 (United States)	8 (France)	12 (Italy)	16 (Italy)	20 (Switzerland)	23 (Austria)	27 (Germany)	30 (France)	35 (Sweden)
1	Michael Walchhofer	Austria	522	36	26	100	80	50	80	100	26	-	24
2	Fritz Strobl	Austria	491	100	50	80	45	80	60	-	26	-	50
3	Daron Rahlves	United States	444	-	100	18	12	100	100	60	18	-	36
4	Marco Büchel	Liechtenstein	400	60	22	24	100	45	29	80	40	-	-
5	Bode Miller	United States	340	9	80	36	32	29	24	50	-	-	80
6	Kjetil André Aamodt	Norway	322	80	32	40	40	-	45	-	45	-	40
7	Hermann Maier	Austria	305	50	12	29	18	20	50	8	100	-	18
8	Bruno Kernen	Switzerland	268	45	45	50	24	-	24	14	40	-	26
9	Didier Défago	Switzerland	246	26	5	8	29	32	32	40	29	-	45
10	Kristian Ghedina	Italy	235	4	13	26	50	40	24	36	22	-	20
11	Erik Guay	Canada	221	14	40	36	60	15	11	45	-	-	-
12	Klaus Kröll	Austria	216	32	-	45	9	26	12	12	80	-	-
13	Aksel Lund Svindal	Norway	182	40	7	12	5	-	18	-	-	-	100
14	Hans Grugger	Austria	166	26	60	60	20	-	-	-	-	-	-
	Peter Fill	Italy	166	5	36	10	-	12	40	3	-	-	60
16	Andreas Buder	Austria	133	10	9	5	16	-	1	32	60	-	-
17	Yannick Bertrand	France	127	29	16	16	-	15	-	7	15	-	29
18	Ambrosi Hoffmann	Switzerland	126	18	4	13	11	3	36	9	32	-	-
	Didier Cuche	Switzerland	126	11	29	8	-	9	-	26	11	-	32
20	Antoine Dénériaz	France	124	22	10	15	36	11	-	29	1	-	-
21	Andreas Schifferer	Austria	111	15	24	-	1	22	13	20	-	-	16
22	Christoph Gruber	Austria	102	20	-	11	7	2	20	22	20	-	-
23	Finlay Mickel	United Kingdom	92	12	-	14	6	-	26	6	6	-	22
24	Steven Nyman	United States	86	18	8	-	-	5	-	5	50	-	-
25	Tobias Grünenfelder	Switzerland	74	-	14	-	-	60	-	-	-	-	-
26	Scott Macartney	United States	60	7	-	-	24	-	5	11	13	-	-
	Pierre-Emmanuel Dalcin	France	60	-	-	-	-	36	8	16	-	-	-
28	Benjamin Raich	Austria	58	-	12	4	-	16	-	26	-	-	-
29	Manuel Osborne-Paradis	Canada	50	-	-	22	15	13	-	-	-	-	-
30	Kurt Sulzenbacher	Italy	46	-	-	9	-	7	14	-	16	-	-
31	Marco Sullivan	United States	45	-	-	-	-	-	15	18	12	-	-
32	François Bourque	Canada	44	-	20	6	-	18	-	-	-	-	-
33	Roland Fischnaller	Italy	40	-	-	-	-	4	16	15	5	-	-
34	Hannes Reichelt	Austria	33	-	-	-	-	10	10	13	-	-	-
35	Patrik Järbyn	Sweden	32	-	3	2	8	-	-	4	15	-	-
36	Jürg Grünenfelder	Switzerland	31	2	-	22	-	-	-	-	7	-	-
37	Norbert Holzknecht	Austria	26	-	-	-	26	-	-	-	-	-	-
38	Andrej Jerman	Slovenia	25	-	-	-	13	-	9	-	3	-	-
39	Bjarne Solbakken	Norway	20	-	18	-	-	-	-	2	-	-	-
40	Alessandro Fattori	Italy	19	1	15	3	-	-	-	-	-	-	-
41	Lasse Kjus	Norway	16	13	3	-	-	-	-	-	-	-	-
	Werner Heel	Italy	16	8	-	-	-	8	-	-	-	-	-
43	Konrad Hari	Switzerland	15	-	-	-	3	-	-	10	2	-	-
44	A. J. Bear	Australia	14	-	-	-	14	-	-	-	-	-	-
	Marc Bottollier-Lasquin	France	14	-	-	-	-	-	6	-	8	-	-
46	Stefan Thanei	Italy	13	-	1	-	2	6	3	1	-	-	-
47	Patrick Staudacher	Italy	12	-	-	-	-	1	2	-	9	-	-
48	Silvan Zurbriggen	Switzerland	11	-	-	1	10	-	-	-	-	-	-
49	John Kucera	Canada	10	6	-	-	-	-	4	-	-	-	-
	Stephan Keppler	Germany	10	-	-	-	-	-	-	-	10	-	-
51	Walter Girardi	Italy	7	3	-	-	-	-	-	-	4	-	-
	Nicolas Burtin	France	7	-	7	-	-	-	-	-	-	-	-
	Thomas Graggaber	Austria	7	-	-	-	-	-	7	-	-	-	-
54	Justin Johnson	United States	4	-	-	-	4	-	-	-	-	-	-

Note:

In the last race only the best racers were allowed to compete and only the best 15 finishers were awarded with points.

== Men's downhill team results ==
bold indicate highest score - italics indicate race wins

Place	Country	Total points	2 (Canada)	5 (United States)	8 (France)	12 (Italy)	16 (Italy)	20 (Switzerland)	23 (Austria)	27 (Germany)	30 (France)	35 (Sweden)	Racers	Wins
1	Austria	2170	289	193	**334**	222	226	253	233	312	-	108	12	4
2	United States	979	34	188	54	72	134	144	144	93	-	116	7	3
3	Switzerland	897	102	97	102	77	104	92	99	121	-	103	8	0
4	Italy	554	21	65	48	52	78	99	55	56	-	80	9	0
5	Norway	540	133	60	52	45	-	63	2	45	-	140	4	1
6	Liechtenstein	400	60	22	24	100	45	29	80	40	-	-	1	1
7	France	332	51	33	31	36	62	14	52	24	-	29	5	0
8	Canada	325	20	60	64	75	46	15	45	-	-	-	4	0
9	United Kingdom	92	12	-	14	6	-	26	6	6	-	22	1	0
10	Sweden	32	-	3	2	8	-	-	4	15	-	-	1	0
11	Slovenia	25	-	-	-	13	-	9	-	3	-	-	1	0
12	Australia	14	-	-	-	14	-	-	-	-	-	-	1	0
13	Germany	10	-	-	-	-	-	-	-	10	-	-	1	0
