= 2004 Alpine Skiing World Cup – Men's downhill =

2004 Men's downhill World Cup
Previous: 2003	Next: 2005

The 2004 Alpine Skiing World Cup – Men's downhill season involved 12 events at sites in North America and Europe between November 2003 and March 2004. Austria's Stephan Eberharter won the individual title.

== Calendar ==
Round	Race No	Place	Country	Date	Winner	Second	Third
1	4	Lake Louise	Canada	November 29, 2003	(Austria) Michael Walchhofer	(Canada) Erik Guay	(France) Antoine Dénériaz
2	6	Beaver Creek	United States	December 5, 2003	(United States) Daron Rahlves	(Austria) Stephan Eberharter (Norway) Bjarne Solbakken
3	7	Beaver Creek	United States	December 6, 2003	(Austria) Hermann Maier	(Austria) Hans Knauß	(Austria) Andreas Schifferer
4	12	Val Gardena	Italy	December 20, 2003	(France) Antoine Dénériaz	(Austria) Michael Walchhofer	(Austria) Hans Knauß
5	16	Chamonix	France	January 10, 2004	(Austria) Stephan Eberharter	(Norway) Lasse Kjus	(Austria) Michael Walchhofer
6	20	Kitzbühel	Austria	January 22, 2004	(Norway) Lasse Kjus	(Austria) Stephan Eberharter	(United States) Daron Rahlves
7	22	Kitzbühel	Austria	January 24, 2004	(Austria) Stephan Eberharter	(United States) Daron Rahlves	(Switzerland) Ambrosi Hoffmann
8	26	Garmisch-Partenkirchen	Germany	January 30, 2004	(Switzerland) Didier Cuche	(United States) Daron Rahlves	(Austria) Stephan Eberharter
9	27	Garmisch-Partenkirchen	Germany	January 31, 2004	(Austria) Stephan Eberharter	(Austria) Fritz Strobl	(Italy) Alessandro Fattori
10	31	St. Anton	Austria	February 14, 2004	(Austria) Hermann Maier	(Austria) Stephan Eberharter	(Austria) Johann Grugger
11	35	Kvitfjell	Norway	March 6, 2004	(Austria) Stephan Eberharter	(Austria) Fritz Strobl	(France) Antoine Dénériaz
12	37	Sestriere	Italy	March 10, 2004	(United States) Daron Rahlves	(Austria) Fritz Strobl	(Austria) Stephan Eberharter

== Final point standings ==
In men's downhill World Cup 2003/04 all results count.

Place	Name	Country	Total points	4 (Canada)	6 (United States)	7 (United States)	12 (Italy)	16 (France)	20 (Austria)	22 (Austria)	26 (Germany)	27 (Germany)	31 (Austria)	35 (Norway)	37 (Italy)
1	Stephan Eberharter	Austria	831	9	80	22	40	100	80	100	60	100	80	100	60
2	Daron Rahlves	United States	627	13	100	50	36	16	60	80	80	18	24	50	100
3	Hermann Maier	Austria	537	29	45	100	45	20	50	29	45	45	100	29	-
4	Fritz Strobl	Austria	512	14	5	29	50	40	29	26	50	80	29	80	80
5	Michael Walchhofer	Austria	503	100	50	40	80	60	15	45	-	15	40	13	45
6	Hans Knauß	Austria	421	45	-	80	60	14	45	50	26	16	40	45	-
7	Antoine Dénériaz	France	367	60	7	-	100	26	18	15	26	7	16	60	32
8	Ambrosi Hoffmann	Switzerland	317	32	6	9	14	5	40	60	32	13	20	36	50
9	Lasse Kjus	Norway	316	40	40	18	14	80	100	24	-	-	-	-	-
	Didier Cuche	Switzerland	316	-	11	-	20	26	14	36	100	29	26	32	22
11	Andreas Schifferer	Austria	296	50	20	60	11	50	10	11	20	20	-	20	24
12	Klaus Kröll	Austria	290	3	29	45	36	14	11	12	14	26	50	24	26
13	Bjarne Solbakken	Norway	268	22	80	16	8	-	-	10	13	-	50	40	29
14	Johann Grugger	Austria	266	36	32	32	-	36	6	-	-	22	60	22	16
15	Bruno Kernen	Switzerland	241	-	22	11	22	29	26	16	40	32	-	7	36
16	Alessandro Fattori	Italy	211	-	-	-	9	2	20	6	36	60	12	26	40
17	Hannes Trinkl	Austria	200	2	32	-	3	45	32	18	16	45	-	7	-
	Christoph Gruber	Austria	200	7	-	-	-	32	24	32	22	45	18	-	20
19	Patrik Järbyn	Sweden	170	22	16	26	18	11	2	13	6	24	22	10	-
20	Kristian Ghedina	Italy	169	8	13	20	24	10	13	40	11	11	4	15	-
21	Didier Défago	Switzerland	147	5	10	12	-	-	3	8	18	50	14	9	18
22	Roland Fischnaller	Italy	97	-	2	-	16	-	22	22	13	-	11	11	-
23	Bode Miller	United States	96	1	-	-	-	-	36	15	4	3	32	5	-
24	Paul Accola	Switzerland	86	-	-	-	7	-	2	20	29	12	-	16	-
25	Kurt Sulzenbacher	Italy	83	-	18	15	11	6	12	3	9	9	-	-	-
	Marco Büchel	Liechtenstein	83	-	-	36	5	10	-	-	5	14	-	13	-
27	Bryon Friedman	United States	82	-	8	7	12	26	5	-	10	4	10	-	-
28	Erik Guay	Canada	81	80	1	-	-	-	-	-	-	-	-	-	-
29	Norbert Holzknecht	Austria	77	16	15	5	29	12	-	-	-	-	-	-	-
30	Franco Cavegn	Switzerland	74	24	26	24	-	-	-	-	-	-	-	-	-
31	Nicolas Burtin	France	70	12	24	8	26	-	-	-	-	-	-	-	-
32	Yannick Bertrand	France	64	4	-	6	5	4	-	5	2	11	9	18	-
33	Peter Fill	Italy	44	15	3	2	-	-	-	15	-	-	9	-	-
34	Sébastien Fournier-Bidoz	France	43	18	12	13	-	-	-	-	-	-	-	-	-
35	Benjamin Raich	Austria	41	-	-	-	-	18	9	-	-	-	-	14	-
36	Aksel Lund Svindal	Norway	40	7	14	4	-	-	-	-	-	-	13	2	-
37	Rolf von Weissenfluh	Switzerland	34	10	10	1	-	8	-	-	-	-	5	-	-
38	Peter Rzehak	Austria	31	-	-	15	-	-	16	-	-	-	-	-	-
39	Max Rauffer	Germany	29	29	-	-	-	-	-	-	-	-	-	-	-
40	Vincent Lavoie	Canada	27	-	-	-	-	-	4	9	-	6	-	8	-
41	Pierre-Emmanuel Dalcin	France	23	-	-	-	6	-	-	-	8	5	1	3	-
42	Josef Strobl	Austria	22	-	-	-	-	15	7	-	-	-	-	-	-
	Florian Eckert	Germany	22	-	-	-	-	-	-	-	7	-	15	-	-
44	Tobias Grünenfelder	Switzerland	20	-	-	-	2	-	8	-	2	2	6	-	-
45	Werner Franz	Austria	18	-	-	-	15	3	-	-	-	-	-	-	-
46	Gregor Šparovec	Slovenia	16	12	4	-	-	-	-	-	-	-	-	-	-
47	Luca Cattaneo	Italy	14	-	-	-	-	7	-	4	3	-	-	-	-
48	Andrej Jerman	Slovenia	11	-	-	11	-	-	-	-	-	-	-	-	-
	Erik Seletto	Italy	11	-	-	-	-	-	-	7	-	1	3	-	-
50	Marc Bottollier-Lasquin	France	10	-	-	-	-	-	-	1	-	8	-	1	-
51	Patrick Staudacher	Italy	7	-	-	-	-	-	-	-	-	-	7	-	-
52	Konrad Hari	Switzerland	5	-	-	-	-	-	-	-	-	-	-	5	-
53	A. J. Bear	Australia	3	-	-	3	-	-	-	-	-	-	-	-	-
54	Johan Clarey	France	2	-	-	-	-	2	-	-	-	-	-	-	-
	Jakub Fiala	United States	2	-	-	-	-	-	-	2	-	-	-	-	-
	David Poisson	France	2	-	-	-	-	-	-	-	-	-	2	-	-
57	Claude Crétier	France	1	-	-	-	1	-	-	-	-	-	-	-	-

Alpine Skiing World Cup
Men

Overall | Downhill | Super G | Giant slalom | Slalom | Combined

2004
