= Alpine skiing at the 2006 Winter Olympics – Men's downhill =

Men's downhill at the XX Olympic Winter Games
- Pictogram for alpine skiing
- Venue: Sestriere
- Date: February 12, 2006
- Competitors: 55 from 25 nations
- Winning time: 1:48.80

Medalists
1st place, gold medalist(s)		Antoine Dénériaz	France
2nd place, silver medalist(s)		Michael Walchhofer	Austria
3rd place, bronze medalist(s)		Bruno Kernen	Switzerland

Men's downhill
- Interactive map of Men's downhill
- Location: Sestriere; Kandahar Banchetta
- Vertical: 914 m (2,999 ft)
- Top elevation: 2,800 m (9,186 ft)
- Base elevation: 1,886 m (6,188 ft)

The men's downhill of the 2006 Winter Olympics was held at Sestriere, Italy, on Sunday, 12 February.

The men's downhill competition is the marquee outdoor event of the Winter Olympics, and is the first alpine event on the schedule. It consists of a single high-speed run down a challenging slope, with a vertical drop exceeding 800 meters (2,625 ft).

The defending Olympic champion was Fritz Strobl of Austria, the reigning world champion was Bode Miller of the United States; Austrian Michael Walchhofer was the defending World Cup downhill champion and led the current season entering the Olympics, ahead of Strobl and American Daron Rahlves.

The thirtieth racer on the course, Antoine Dénériaz of France won the gold medal, Walchhofer took the silver, and the bronze medalist was Bruno Kernen of Switzerland; Miller was fifth, Strobl eighth, and Rahlves tenth. Dénériaz's surprise win was by a margin of 0.72 seconds, the largest in this event in 42 years. He had entered the Olympics tied for tenth in the World Cup downhill standings; his best finish was seventh at Val Gardena in mid-December.

Held on the Kandahar Banchetta piste, the course started at an elevation of 2,800 m (9,186 ft) above sea level with a vertical drop of 914 m (2,999 ft) and a length of 3.299 km (2.05 mi). Dénériaz's winning time of 108.80 seconds yielded an average course speed of 109.158 km/h (67.8 mph), with an average vertical descent speed of 8.401 m/s (27.6 ft/s).

== Results ==
The race was started at 12:00 local time, (UTC +1). At the starting gate, the skies were partly cloudy, the temperature was −5.6 °C (22 °F), and the snow condition was hard; the temperature at the finish was 2.1 °C (36 °F).

Rank	Bib	Name	Country	Time	Difference
1st place, gold medalist(s)	30	Antoine Dénériaz	France	1:48.80	—
2nd place, silver medalist(s)	10	Michael Walchhofer	Austria	1:49.52	+0.72
3rd place, bronze medalist(s)	14	Bruno Kernen	Switzerland	1:49.82	+1.02
4	17	Kjetil André Aamodt	Norway	1:49.88	+1.08
5	18	Bode Miller	United States	1:49.93	+1.13
6	15	Hermann Maier	Austria	1:50.00	+1.20
7	28	Marco Büchel	Liechtenstein	1:50.04	+1.24
8	4	Fritz Strobl	Austria	1:50.12	+1.32
9	25	Patrick Staudacher	Italy	1:50.29	+1.49
10	20	Daron Rahlves	United States	1:50.33	+1.53
11	22	Pierre-Emmanuel Dalcin	France	1:50.35	+1.55
12	3	Tobias Grünenfelder	Switzerland	1:50.44	+1.64
13	29	Manuel Osborne-Paradis	Canada	1:50.45	+1.65
14	8	Lasse Kjus	Norway	1:50.64	+1.84
15	23	Scott Macartney	United States	1:50.68	+1.88
16	11	François Bourque	Canada	1:50.70	+1.90
17	13	Ambrosi Hoffmann	Switzerland	1:50.72	+1.92
18	6	Kurt Sulzenbacher	Italy	1:50.84	+2.04
19	27	Steve Nyman	United States	1:50.88	+2.08
19	19	Peter Fill	Italy	1:50.88	+2.08
21	26	Aksel Lund Svindal	Norway	1:50.90	+2.10
22	21	Klaus Kröll	Austria	1:50.91	+2.11
23	12	Kristian Ghedina	Italy	1:50.98	+2.18
24	16	Yannick Bertrand	France	1:51.37	+2.57
25	2	Finlay Mickel	Great Britain	1:51.48	+2.68
26	24	Didier Défago	Switzerland	1:51.51	+2.71
27	7	John Kucera	Canada	1:51.55	+2.75
28	32	Andrej Jerman	Slovenia	1:51.70	+2.90
29	9	Bjarne Solbakken	Norway	1:51.72	+2.92
30	38	Pavel Chestakov	Russia	1:51.93	+3.13
31	34	Andrej Šporn	Slovenia	1:52.17	+3.37
32	1	Craig Branch	Australia	1:52.55	+3.75
33	31	Patrik Järbyn	Sweden	1:52.87	+4.07
34	39	Petr Záhrobský	Czech Republic	1:52.90	+4.10
35	35	Claudio Sprecher	Liechtenstein	1:53.34	+4.54
36	36	Bořek Zakouřil	Czech Republic	1:54.07	+5.27
37	33	Roger Cruickshank	Great Britain	1:54.65	+5.85
38	42	Aleksandr Khoroshilov	Russia	1:54.70	+5.90
39	37	Alex Antor	Andorra	1:55.01	+6.21
40	41	Konstantin Sats	Russia	1:55.03	+6.23
41	47	Mikael Gayme	Chile	1:55.73	+6.93
42	40	Maui Gayme	Chile	1:56.10	+7.30
43	45	Nikolai Hentsch	Brazil	1:56.58	+7.78
44	49	Michał Kałwa	Poland	1:56.81	+8.01
45	54	Jaroslav Babušiak	Slovakia	1:57.45	+8.65
46	43	Renārs Doršs	Latvia	1:57.54	+8.74
47	51	Nikolay Skriabin	Ukraine	1:57.56	+8.76
48	46	Sindri Már Pálsson	Iceland	1:57.69	+8.89
49	50	Jorge Mandrú	Chile	1:58.77	+9.97
50	48	Roger Vidosa	Andorra	1:59.24	+10.44
51	52	Andrei Drygin	Tajikistan	1:59.41	+10.61
52	53	Alexander Heath	South Africa	1:59.79	+10.99
53	44	Florentin Nicolae	Romania	2:00.93	+12.13
	5	Ondřej Bank	Czech Republic	DNF	
	55	Ivan Heimschild	Slovakia	DNF	
