= Streif =

Ski trail in Kitzbühel, Austria

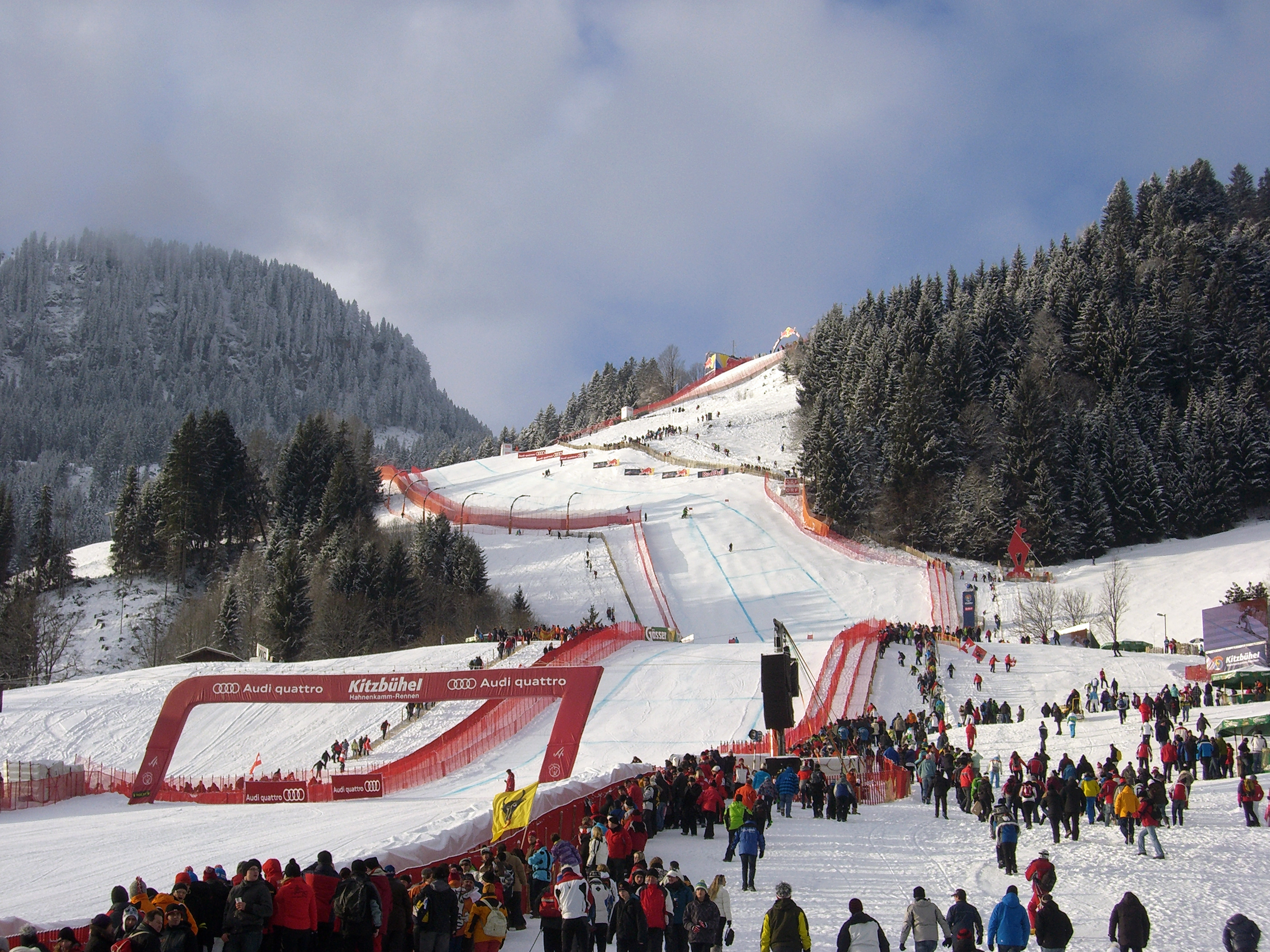
- Lower section (Hausberg–Traverse–Zielschuss)
- Interactive map of Streif
- Location within Austria Location within Alps Location within Europe
- 47°25′27″N 12°21′55″E
- Location: Kitzbühel, Austria
- Mountain: Hahnenkamm
- Opened: 19 March 1937; 89 years ago
- Member: Club5+
- Competition: Hahnenkamm Races

Downhill
- Start: 1,665 m (5,463 ft) (AA)
- Finish: 805 m (2,641 ft)
- Vertical drop: 860 m (2,822 ft)
- Length: 3,312 m (2.06 mi)
- Max incline: 40.4 degrees (85%)
- Avg incline: 15.1 degrees (27%)
- Min incline: 1.1 degrees (2%)
- Most Wins (M): (Switzerland) Didier Cuche (5×)

Super-G
- Start: 1,345 m (4,413 ft) (AA)
- Finish: 805 m (2,641 ft)
- Vertical drop: 540 m (1,772 ft)
- Length: 2,150 m (1.34 mi)

Streif is a World Cup downhill ski course in Austria, located on Hahnenkamm mountain (Kitzbühel Alps) in Kitzbühel, Tyrol, and has hosted the Hahnenkamm Races since 1937.

It runs on natural terrain (pasture in summer) with minor modifications done over the years, adjacent to the "Ganslern" slalom course.

With 50,000 people attending, the Streif is the most visited ski event each year, with many famous people having attended, including Arnold Schwarzenegger.

== History ==
From 1931 until 1936 it was held on the nearby courses "Hahnenkamm" and "Ehrenbachhöhe". Since its inception in 1937, the Hahnenkamm slalom is held on this course (Ganslern).

In 1954, one time exceptionally no Hahnenkamm Trophy was awarded, they were competing on the so-called "Vorderganslern" at Austrian International Winter Sports III competition.

In 2006, morning fog at the top forced organizers to lower the start 115 m (380 ft) to the middle of the "Karusell", below the "Mausefalle". This shortened the length of the course by 347 m.

The downhill races were cancelled in the 1964, 1970, 1971, 1988, 1993, 2005 and 2007 seasons due to weather conditions, mostly due to lack of snow, and were held at other venues.

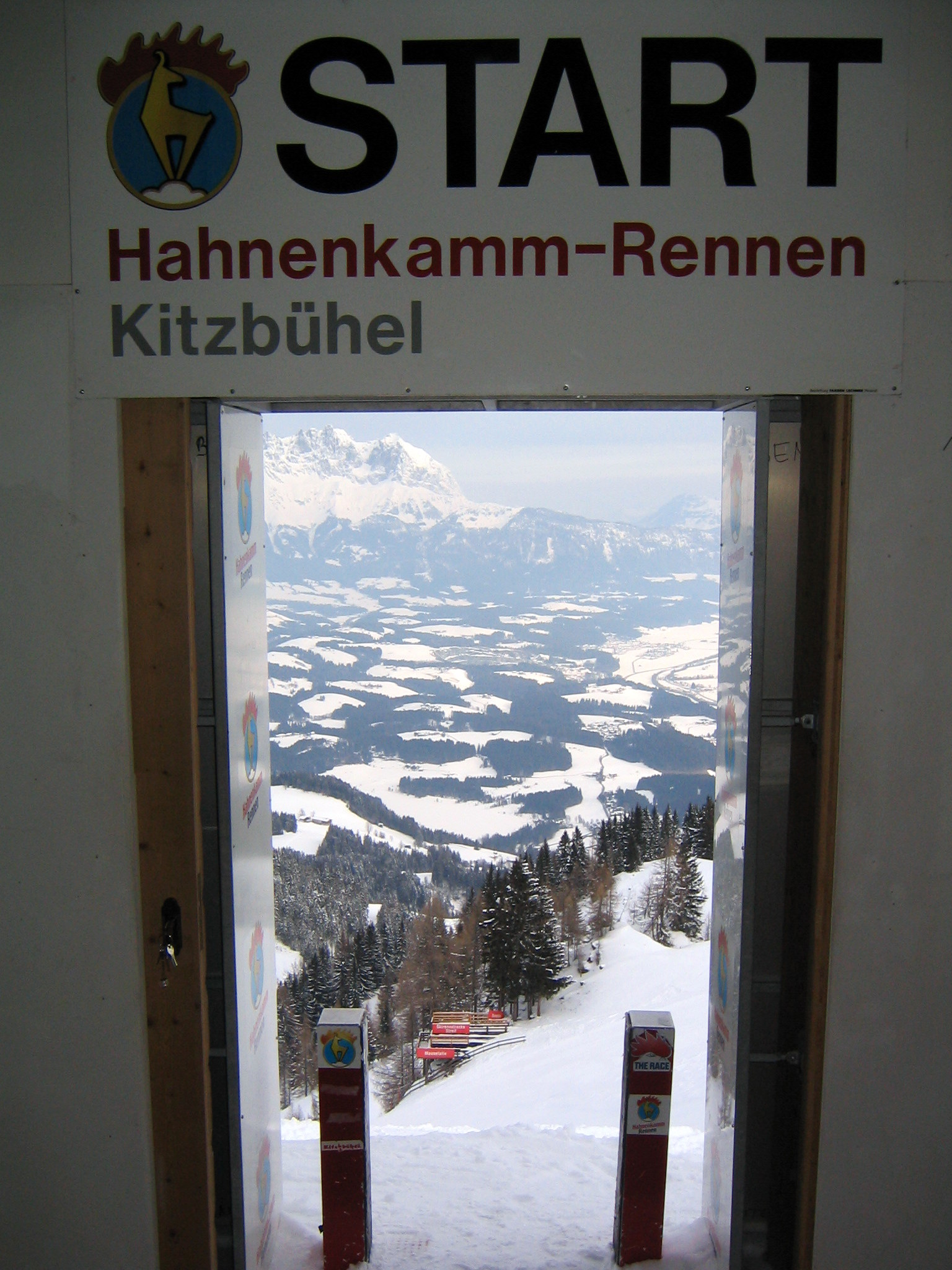
Start – "Mausefalle"

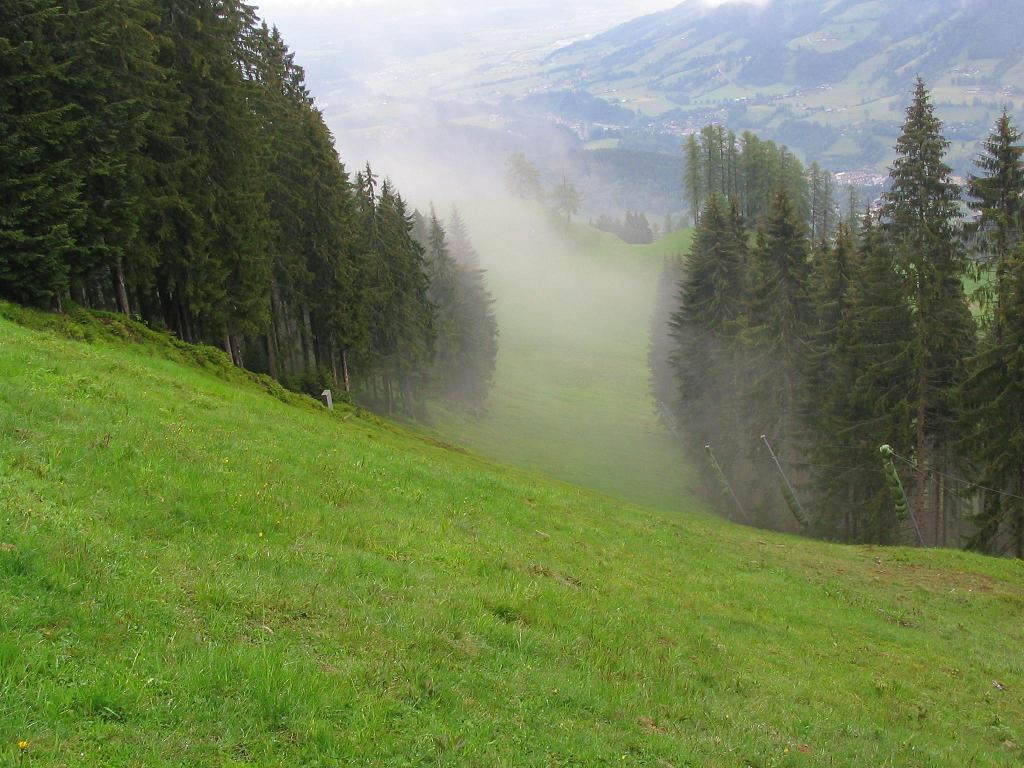
"Alte Schneise" (Old corridor)

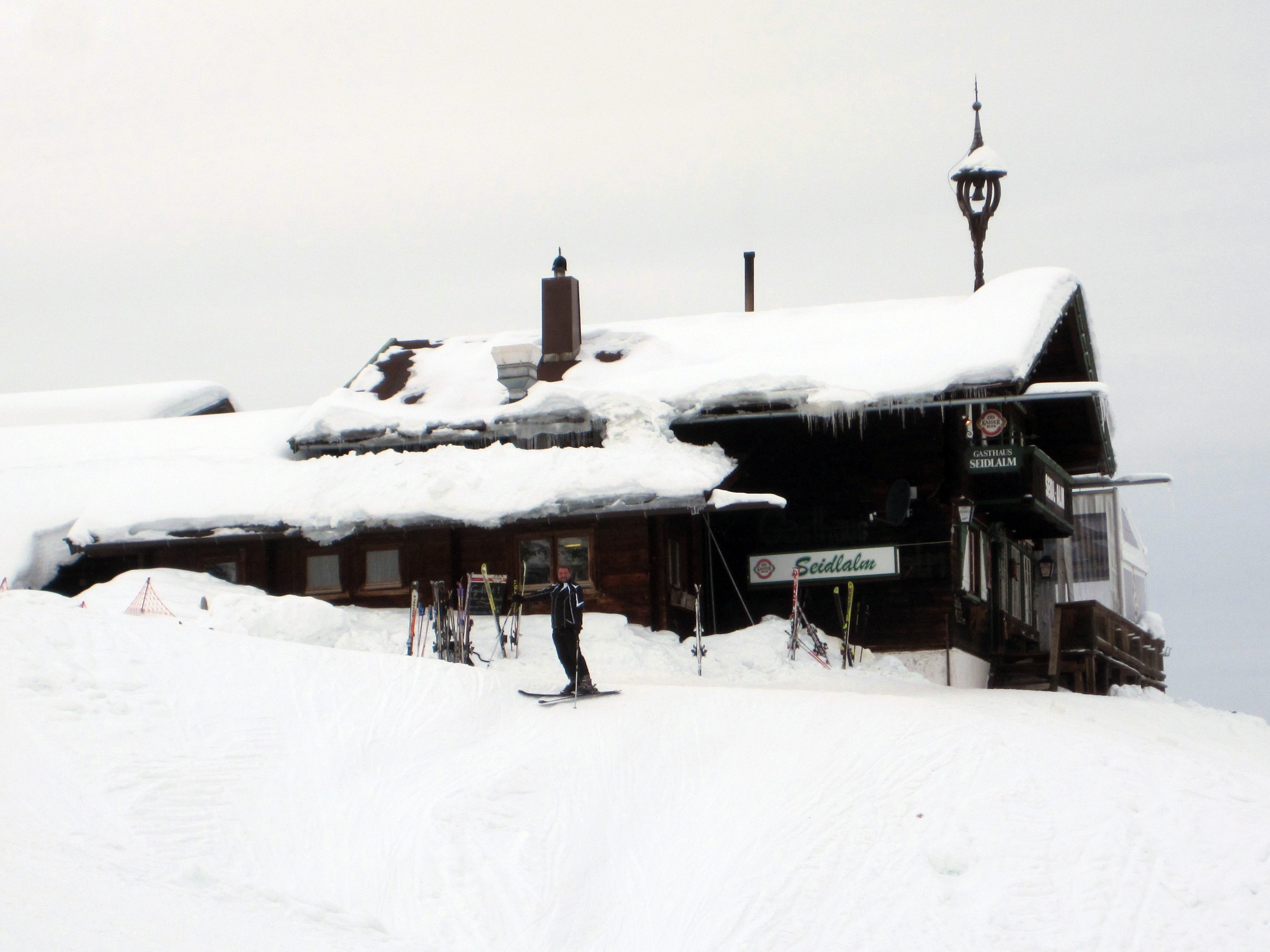
Seidlalm, a gasthaus where the FIS Alpine Ski World Cup was founded in 1966 by Serge Lang, Honore Bonnet and Bob Beattie. It is located next to "Seidlalmsprung"

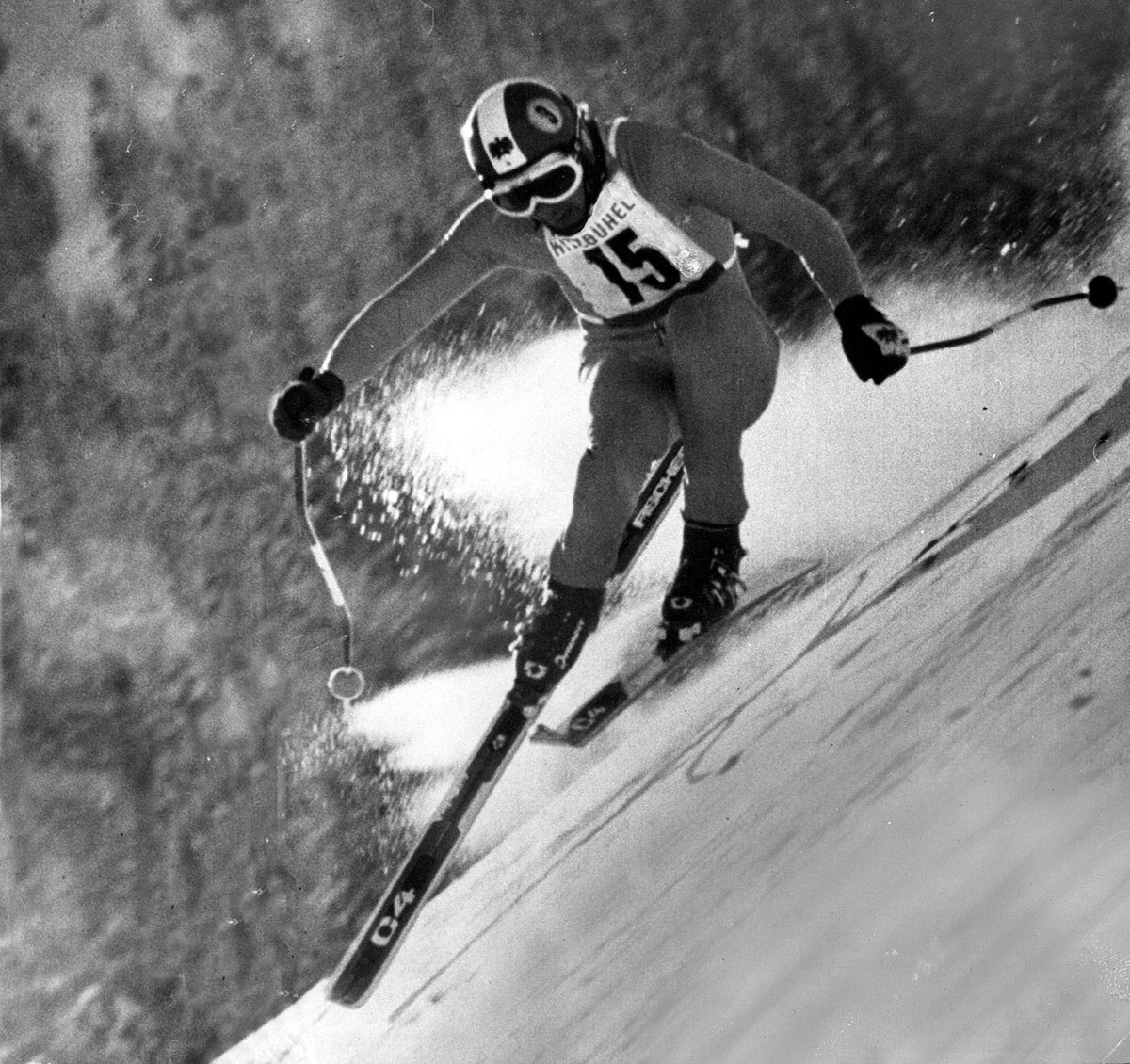
Franz Klammer in 1976, the second of his four Streif wins

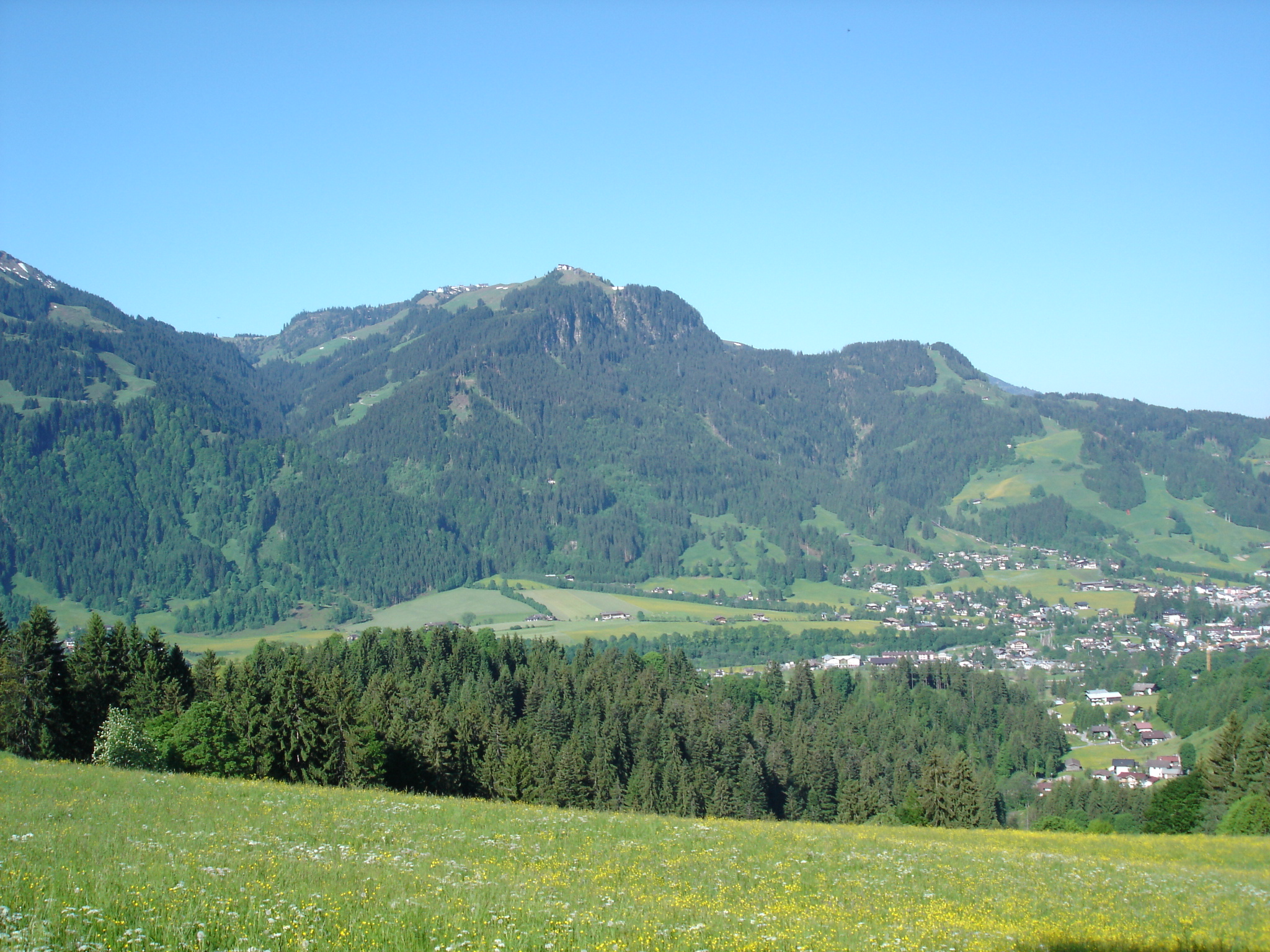
Full "Streif" course seen on the Hahnenkamm mountain (far right)

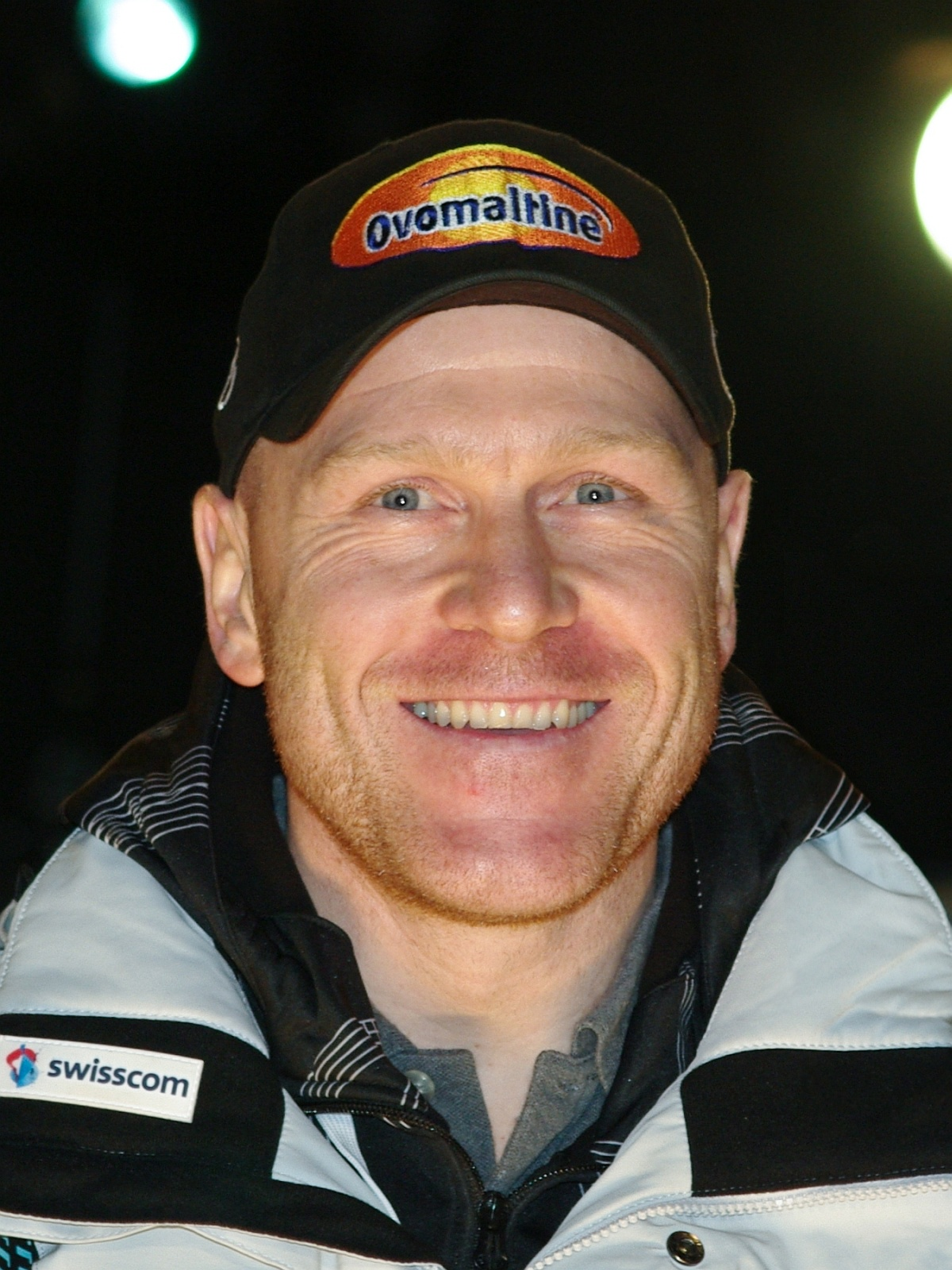
Didier Cuche (SUI) won a record of 5 downhills in total

In 2008, strong upwinds at the "Mausefalle" caused race officials to lower the start 50 m (160 ft), shortening the course by 100 m (330 ft). This eliminated most of the "Startschuss" and its instantaneous speed; the "Mausefalle" was accordingly altered to a speed-inducing pitch, rather than a formidable jump and compression. Though Didier Cuche won the race, the 2008 edition is likely best remembered for the high-speed crash of Scott Macartney on the "Zielsprung", seconds before the finish, as well as Bode Miller tying for second with Mario Scheiber after riding the safety fencing in the "Steilhang" exit to "Brückenschuss" section.

The full course returned in 2009, for the first time in five years, with Didier Défago winning the race. In addition to having the fastest time, he also had the highest speed on the "Zielschuss" at 142.3 km/h (88.4 mph). It was the second consecutive downhill victory for Défago; he won the Lauberhorn downhill the previous week at Wengen to join a handful of skiers to win both classic races in consecutive weeks. It was last accomplished by Stephan Eberharter in 2002 and first Swiss win since 1992 win by Franz Heinzer. The final training run on Thursday saw the serious crash of Swiss racer Daniel Albrecht, again at the "Zielsprung." It resulted in a three-week coma and Albrecht's absence from the World Cup circuit for the remainder of the 2009 season and the entire 2010 season.

The full course was run in 2010 under clear skies and again won by Didier Cuche, who had also won the Super-G the previous day. The only significant crash was by former champion Michael Walchhofer, who twisted into the net fence at the final left turn, less than 20 seconds from the finish; he was quickly back on his feet. Cuche's downhill victory was his third on the "Streif", his first was in 1998 on a Friday "extra" race. The "Zielsprung" was significantly moderated in 2010 due to the serious accidents the previous two years.

In 2011, Didier Cuche won the Hahnenkamm downhill for the fourth time to tie the record with Franz Klammer.

A year later, and two days after announcing his retirement at the end of the season, Cuche claimed his third consecutive downhill victory at Kitzbühel and a record fifth in total.

in 2013, Dominik Paris claimed the title to become the second winner from Italy and the first in fifteen years after Kristian Ghedina.

in 2014, the lower course was altered due to lack of snow. The dramatic "Querfahrt" sidehill traverse and speed-inducing "Zielschuss" were bypassed; the racers detoured toward the "Ganslern" slalom course, then rejoined the course for the final "Rasmusleitn". This extended the overall length by 182 m (597 ft) to 3.494 ft (1.065 m) and reduced the finishing speed. Hannes Reichelt was the first winner from Austria in eight years.

In 2015, upper mountain fog forced the start to the "Seidlalmsprung" section, the lowest in history. Kjetil Jansrud of Norway won in less than a minute on the lower 50% of the course.

High winds in 2016 lowered the start 40 m to the top of Mausefalle. On the full course in 2017, Paris became a two-time winner.

In 2023, Lindsey Vonn became the first woman to ski the Streif, although on her own and not competitively.

== Course sections ==
Sections of the Streif downhill course include:

=== Startschuss ===
The course starts at an elevation of 1,665 m (AA) and descends a 160-metre-long section known as "Startschuss" with a 27° (51%) incline. Skiers reach speeds of 100 km/h within 8.5 seconds on the iced surface before entering the "Mausefalle" jump. The start area is characterized by a quiet environment.

=== Mausefalle ===
"Mausefalle" (mousetrap) is the most famous and the steepest part of the course with 40.4° degrees (85%) incline. Skier overjumps this incredibly steep hang about 80 meters long at about 100 km/h and increase up to 120 km/h at the bottom of this section. Around 1955, this section was named by the father of Austrian ski legend Toni Sailer, who compared this jump to a mouse trap as skiers jump to the unknown, into the abyss.

=== Karussell ===
"Karussell" (carousel) is a very demanding at high speed entering 180-degree leaning turn. Here athletes endure centrifugal force of 3.1 g.

=== Steilhang ===
"Steilhang" (steep slope) is one of the most technically challenging sections in the World Cup with demanding and extended technical right turn with 35.8° degrees (72%) incline and entrance to the flats at the end.

=== Brückenschuss & Gschöss ===
"Brückenschuss & Gschöss" are considered the easiest part of the course, gliding flats road.

=== Alte Schneise ===
"Alte Schneise" (old corridor) is the steep long section, not extremely demanding. Section starts after small jump, right after gliding flats road

=== Seidlalmsprung ===
"Seidlalmsprung" (Seidlalm jump) was first introduced in 1994. It is located next to Seidlalm farm, where World Cup was founded by Serge Lang, Honore Bonnet and Bob Beattie in 1966. It is exactly on midpoint of the course. Athletes approach the jump in a deep squat position, without being able to see what is coming next. This is no time to be making any mistakes! Whilst in the air they must rotate to the right in order to be correctly positioned for the sweeping curve of the "Seidlalmkurve".

=== Lärchenschuss ===
"Lärchenschuss" is a gliding among larch trees section, reached right after 90° degrees turn, leading into "Oberhausberg" section

=== Hausbergkante ===
"Hausbergkante" (Hausberg fall) hang is the key and deciding part of the course, jumping over 35° degrees (70%) incline gradient into extremely demanding left turn into a compression.

It is followed by a challenging sharp left turn to the "Hausberg Querfahrt" into "Traverse", where the most falls, some of them very spectacular happened over the years.

=== Traverse ===
"Traverse" or "Querfahrt", is a rough sidehill of glare ice, strong leaning bumpy terrain, defying gravity, with many spectacular falls in the past.

=== Zielschuss ===
"Zielschuss" (Finish speed ride) with compression & jump and with top speed over 145 km/h (90 mph) leading into a finish jump. In 2006, Michael Walchhofer set the course top speed record at 153 km/h (95 mph).

=== Rasmusleitn ===
"Rasmusleitn" or "Zielsprung" is a spectacular, long and very tricky jump just before the finish line at high speed, on which many suffered severe injuries with brutal falls.

== Facts and figures ==
- The length of the Streif course is 3.312 km (2.058 mi).
- The starting gate is at an elevation of 1,665 m (5,463 ft) above sea level;
  the Streif vertically descends 860 m (2,822 ft) to the finish at 805 m (2,641 ft).
- The average grade of the course is 27 percent (15.1 degrees).
- The maximum grade is 85% (40.4°) at the Mausefalle; minimum is 2% (1.1°)
- The record for the full 3.3 km course was set in 1997 by Fritz Strobl of Austria at 1:51.58, an average speed of 106.9 km/h (66.4 mph), and an average vertical descent rate of 7.7 metres per second (25 ft/s).
- The first non-European to win a downhill race at Kitzbühel in the World Cup era was Ken Read of Canada in 1980. Previously, the only non-European champion was Buddy Werner of the U.S., who won in 1959 at age 22. Canadians won races four consecutive years from 1980–83; the only non-European winner since is Daron Rahlves of the U.S., who prevailed on an abbreviated course of 2.0 km (1.2 mi) due to fog in 2003.
- Five victories have gone to Scandinavians, all from Norway. Atle Skårdal was the first in 1990 and Lasse Kjus won twice, in 1999 and 2004; both of Kjus' victories were "extra" races, held on Friday and Thursday, respectively. Kjetil Jansrud won on a shortened course in 2015. In 2022 Aleksander Aamodt Kilde became the fourth Norwegian to win this race.
- The Streif course was one of several featured in the 1969 movie Downhill Racer, starring Robert Redford and Gene Hackman. It was shown as itself and later as the Olympic course, with race footage from the 1969 race.
- The Streif course was first used in 1937; eight years without Hahnenkamm races followed (1938–45) until the return in 1946.
- Since returning in 1946, the downhill races have been run in all but eight years: 1952, 1964, 1970, 1971, 1988, 1993, 2005, & 2007.

=== Downhill champions ===
The following is a list of Hahnenkamm downhill winners, with their winning times:

Date	Year	Winner	Nation	Time	Notes
↓ FIS World Cup ↓
24 January	2026	Giovanni Franzoni	Italy	1:52.31	Full course
25 January	2025	James Crawford	Canada	1:53.64	
20 January	2024	Cyprien Sarrazin (2)	France	1:52.96	
19 January	2024	Cyprien Sarrazin (1)	France	1:55.75	"Friday"
21 January	2023	Aleksander Aamodt Kilde (2)	Norway	1:56.90	
20 January	2023	Vincent Kriechmayr	Austria	1:56.16	"Friday"
23 January	2022	Beat Feuz (3)	Switzerland	1:56.68	"Sunday" – moved from Saturday (weather forecasts)
21 January	2022	Aleksander Aamodt Kilde (1)	Norway	1:55.92	"Friday" – high winds, start lowered 45 m
24 January	2021	Beat Feuz (2)	Switzerland	1:55.29	"Sunday" – moved from Saturday (rain and snow)
22 January	2021	Beat Feuz (1)	Switzerland	1:53.77	"Friday" – replaced Wengen (COVID-19)
25 January	2020	Matthias Mayer	Austria	1:55.59	
25 January	2019	Dominik Paris (3)	Italy	1:56.82	"Friday" – moved from Saturday (weather forecasts)
20 January	2018	Thomas Dressen	Germany	1:56.15	
21 January	2017	Dominik Paris (2)	Italy	1:55.01	
23 January	2016	Peter Fill	Italy	1:52.37	high winds, start lowered 40 m
24 January	2015	Kjetil Jansrud	Norway	0:58.16	fog; start: "Seidlalmsprung" – 1.6 km
25 January	2014	Hannes Reichelt	Austria	2:03.38	lack of snow, "Querfahrt" & "Zielschuss" bypassed
26 January	2013	Dominik Paris (1)	Italy	1:57.56	
21 January	2012	Didier Cuche (5)	Switzerland	1:13.28	snowing; start: "Alte Schneise" – 2 km
22 January	2011	Didier Cuche (4)	Switzerland	1:57.72	
23 January	2010	Didier Cuche (3)	Switzerland	1:53.74	
24 January	2009	Didier Défago	Switzerland	1:56.09	
19 January	2008	Didier Cuche (2)	Switzerland	1:52.75	upwinds – start lowered 50 m
27 January	2007	lack of snow and warm temperatures; replaced in Garmisch-Pa on 23 February 2007			
21 January	2006	Michael Walchhofer	Austria	1:46.75	fog; start: bottom of "Mausefalle" for safety
22 January	2005	safety reasons; snow and rain; replaced in Garmisch-Pa on 18 February 2005			
24 January	2004	Stephan Eberharter (2)	Austria	1:55.48	
22 January	2004	Lasse Kjus (2)	Norway	1:58.78	"Thursday" – replaced Wengen (snow, wind)
25 January	2003	Daron Rahlves	United States	1:09.63	fog; start at "Alte Schneise" – 2 km
19 January	2002	Stephan Eberharter (1)	Austria	1:54.21	
20 January	2001	Hermann Maier	Austria	1:56.84	
22 January	2000	Fritz Strobl (2)	Austria	1:46.54	shortened
23 January	1999	Hans Knauß	Austria	1:54.18	
22 January	1999	Lasse Kjus (1)	Norway	2:14.13	"Friday" – 2 runs sprint (start: "Alte Schneise")
24 January	1998	Kristian Ghedina	Italy	2:05.49	
23 January	1998	Didier Cuche (1)	Switzerland	2:31.55	two shortened runs – start: "Alte Schneise"
25 January	1997	Fritz Strobl (1)	Austria	1:51.58	record time for full course
24 January	1997	Luc Alphand (3)	France	2:12.55	"Friday" – 2 runs sprint (start: "Alte Schneise")
13 January	1996	Günther Mader	Austria	1:54.29	record: held for 1 year
14 January	1995	Luc Alphand (2)	France	1:40.97	DH2 – start: "Steilhang" (too much snow)
14 January	1995	Luc Alphand (1)	France	1:40.33	DH1 – start: "Steilhang" (from Friday to Saturday)
15 January	1994	Patrick Ortlieb	Austria	2:00.12	
16 January	1993	lack of snow; replaced in St. Anton on 16 January 1993 (snowmaking added)			
18 January	1992	Franz Heinzer (3)	Switzerland	1:56.63	
17 January	1992	Franz Heinzer (2)	Switzerland	1:56.04	"Friday" – replaced St. Anton (record held 4 years)
12 January	1991	Franz Heinzer (1)	Switzerland	1:58.71	
20 January	1990	Atle Skårdal	Norway	2:26.20	
14 January	1989	Daniel Mahrer	Switzerland	1:58.42	
13 January	1989	Marc Girardelli	Luxembourg	2:01.25	"Friday" – replaced Las Leñas
16 January	1988	lack of snow; replaced in Bad Kleinkirchheim on 16 January 1988			
25 January	1987	Pirmin Zurbriggen (3)	Switzerland	1:58.06	
18 January	1986	Peter Wirnsberger (2)	Austria	2:02.04	
17 January	1986	Peter Wirnsberger (1)	Austria	2:01.77	"Friday" – replaced Garmisch-Partenkirchen
12 January	1985	Pirmin Zurbriggen (2)	Switzerland	2:08.65	
11 January	1985	Pirmin Zurbriggen (1)	Switzerland	2:06.95	"Friday" – replaced Puy St. Vincent
21 January	1984	Franz Klammer (4)	Austria	2:02.82	
22 January	1983	Todd Brooker	Canada	2:01.96	
21 January	1983	Bruno Kernen	Switzerland	2:06.68	"Friday" – replaced Wengen
16 January	1982	Steve Podborski (2)	Canada	1:57.24	
15 January	1982	Harti Weirather	Austria	1:57.20	"Friday" – replaced Morzine (record held 10 years)
17 January	1981	Steve Podborski (1)	Canada	2:03.46	
12 January	1980	Ken Read	Canada	2:04.93	
20 January	1979	Sepp Ferstl (2)	West Germany	2:04.48	
21 January	1978	Josef Walcher (2) & Sepp Ferstl (1)	Austria; West Germany	2:07.81	tied result (double win)
20 January	1978	Josef Walcher (1)	Austria	2:06.90	"Friday" – replaced Heavenly Valley
15 January	1977	Franz Klammer (3)	Austria	2:09.71	
25 January	1976	Franz Klammer (2)	Austria	2:03.79	
18 January	1975	Franz Klammer (1)	Austria	2:03.22	record held for 7 years
26 January	1974	Roland Collombin (2)	Switzerland	2:03.29	record held for 1 year
27 January	1973	Roland Collombin (1)	Switzerland	2:13.32	
15 January	1972	Karl Schranz (4)	Austria	2:24.36	
14 January	1972	Karl Schranz (3)	Austria	2:23.70	"Friday" – replaced Val d'Isere
23 January	1971	cancelled; replaced in Megève on 31 January 1971			
17 January	1970	cancelled; replaced with GS on Ganslern course on 17 January 1970			
18 January	1969	Karl Schranz (2)	Austria	2:18.80	
20 January	1968	Gerhard Nenning	Austria	2:14.49	
21 January	1967	Jean-Claude Killy	France	2:11.82	record held for 7 years
↓ FIS–A ↓
22 January	1966	Karl Schranz (1)	Austria	2:16.6	record held for 1 year
23 January	1965	Ludwig Leitner	West Germany	2:30.8	
	1964	lack of snow			
19 January	1963	Egon Zimmermann	Austria	2:20.7	record held for 3 years
20 January	1962	Willi Forrer	Switzerland	2:37.6	
21 January	1961	Guy Périllat	France	2:29.2	
16 January	1960	Adrien Duvillard	France	2:26.1	record: held for 3 years
17 January	1959	Buddy Werner	United States	2:33.4	record held for 1 year
18 January	1958	Anderl Molterer (2)	Austria	2:40.7	record held for 1 year
19 January	1957	Toni Sailer (2)	Austria	2:47.1	
14 January	1956	Toni Sailer (1)	Austria	2:57.8	
15 January	1955	Anderl Molterer (1)	Austria	2:46.2	record held for 3 years
23 January	1954	Christian Pravda (3)	Austria	2:47.9	record held for 1 year
17 January	1953	Bernhard Perren	Switzerland	2:54.5	record held for 1 year
↓ International ↓
	1952	not on calendar due to International Nordic ski week			
8 February	1951	Christian Pravda (2)	Austria	N/A	
7 February	1951	Christian Pravda (1)	Austria	2:57.1	"Friday" – replaced...?
11 March	1950	Fritz Huber (2)	Austria	N/A	
11 March	1950	Fritz Huber (1)	Austria	3:04.3	Replaced downhill for...?
3 February	1949	Egon Schöpf	Austria	3:03.0	
13 March	1948	Helmut Lantschner	Austria	3:16.3	
13 March	1948	Edi Mall	Austria	3:14.1	Replaced downhill for...?
7 March	1947	Karl Feix	Austria	3:36.0	
2 March	1946	Thaddäus Schwabl (2)	Austria	3:04.3	
	1945	no races during World War II period			
	1944	no races during World War II period			
	1943	no races during World War II period			
	1942	no races during World War II period			
	1941	no races during World War II period			
	1940	no races during World War II period			
	1939	no races during World War II period			
	1938	no races during World War II period			
19 March	1937	Thaddäus Schwabl (1)	Austria	3:53.1	"Streif" course premiere (held ever since)
↓ Competition held on other courses ↓
7 March	1936	Freidl Pfeifer	Austria	5:03.2	held on "Penkelstein" course
23 March	1935	Siegfried Engl	Austria	4:38.8	held on "Stickelberg" course
24 March	1934	race announced; not realized due to political reasons			
25 March	1933	race announced; not realized due to political reasons			
19 March	1932	Walter Prager	Switzerland	7:56.4	held on "Stickelberg" course
28 March	1931	Ferdl Friedensbacher	Austria	4:34.2	held on "Flecklam" course

- Each downhill champion's name is affixed to a gondola car on the Hahnenkammbahn lift, which extends from the Kitzbühel base to the top of the Hahnenkamm mountain.

== Club5+ ==
In 1986, elite Club5 was originally founded by prestigious classic downhill organizers: Kitzbühel, Wengen, Garmisch, Val d’Isère and Val Gardena/Gröden, with goal to bring alpine ski sport on the highest levels possible.

Later over the years other classic longterm organizers joined the now named Club5+: Alta Badia, Cortina, Kranjska Gora, Maribor, Lake Louise, Schladming, Adelboden, Kvitfjell, St.Moritz and Åre.
