= 2003–04 FIS Alpine Ski World Cup =

International sports competition

FIS Alpine Ski World Cup 2003/04
Discipline	Men	Women
Overall	(Austria) Hermann Maier	(Sweden) Anja Pärson
Downhill	(Austria) Stephan Eberharter	(Austria) Renate Götschl
Super-G	(Austria) Hermann Maier	(Austria) Renate Götschl
Giant slalom	(United States) Bode Miller	(Sweden) Anja Pärson
Slalom	(Austria) Rainer Schönfelder	(Sweden) Anja Pärson
Combined	(United States) Bode Miller	–
- Nations Cup: Austria

Competition
Locations	18	16
Individual	40	35

The 38th World Cup season began in October 2003 in Sölden, Austria, and concluded at the World Cup finals in Sestriere, Italy, in March 2004. Sestriere would host the alpine skiing events at the 2006 Winter Olympics.

Hermann Maier of Austria and Anja Pärson of Sweden won the overall titles.

== Men ==
=== Race results ===
Date	Location	Nation	Disc.	Winner	Second	Third
26 October 2003	Sölden	Austria	GS	(United States) Bode Miller	(France) Frédéric Covili	(France) Joël Chenal
22 November 2003	Park City	United States	GS	(United States) Bode Miller	(Austria) Andreas Schifferer	(Austria) Hans Knauß
23 November 2003	Park City	United States	SL	(Finland) Kalle Palander	(Austria) Rainer Schönfelder	(Austria) Manfred Pranger
29 November 2003	Lake Louise	Canada	DH	(Austria) Michael Walchhofer	(Canada) Erik Guay	(France) Antoine Dénériaz
30 November 2003	Lake Louise	Canada	SG	(Austria) Hermann Maier	(Austria) Michael Walchhofer	(Austria) Stephan Eberharter
5 December 2003	Beaver Creek	United States	DH	(United States) Daron Rahlves	(Austria) Stephan Eberharter (Norway) Bjarne Solbakken	
6 December 2003	Beaver Creek	United States	DH	(Austria) Hermann Maier	(Austria) Hans Knauß	(Austria) Andreas Schifferer
7 December 2003	Beaver Creek	United States	SG	(Norway) Bjarne Solbakken	(Austria) Hermann Maier	(Austria) Hans Knauß
14 December 2003	Alta Badia	Italy	GS	(Finland) Kalle Palander	(Italy) Davide Simoncelli	(France) Frédéric Covili
15 December 2003	Madonna di Campiglio	Italy	SL	(Croatia) Ivica Kostelić	(Italy) Giorgio Rocca	(Austria) Manfred Pranger
19 December 2003	Val Gardena	Italy	SG	(Norway) Lasse Kjus	(Austria) Stephan Eberharter	(Austria) Hermann Maier
20 December 2003	Val Gardena	Italy	DH	(France) Antoine Dénériaz	(Austria) Michael Walchhofer	(Austria) Hans Knauß
21 December 2003	Alta Badia	Italy	GS	(Italy) Davide Simoncelli	(Finland) Kalle Palander	(United States) Bode Miller
3 January 2004	Flachau	Austria	GS	(Austria) Benjamin Raich	(Italy) Massimiliano Blardone	(Norway) Bjarne Solbakken
4 January 2004	Flachau	Austria	SL	(Finland) Kalle Palander	(Austria) Manfred Pranger	(Italy) Giorgio Rocca
10 January 2004	Chamonix	France	DH	(Austria) Stephan Eberharter	(Norway) Lasse Kjus	(Austria) Michael Walchhofer
11 January 2004	Chamonix	France	SL	(Italy) Giorgio Rocca	(France) Pierrick Bourgeat	(United States) Bode Miller
11 January 2004	Chamonix	France	K	(United States) Bode Miller	(Austria) Benjamin Raich	(Norway) Lasse Kjus
18 January 2004	Wengen	Switzerland	SL	(Austria) Benjamin Raich	(Austria) Rainer Schönfelder	(Croatia) Ivica Kostelić
22 January 2004	Kitzbühel	Austria	DH	(Norway) Lasse Kjus	(Austria) Stephan Eberharter	(United States) Daron Rahlves
23 January 2004	Kitzbühel	Austria	SG	(United States) Daron Rahlves	(Austria) Hermann Maier	(Austria) Michael Walchhofer
24 January 2004	Kitzbühel	Austria	DH	(Austria) Stephan Eberharter	(United States) Daron Rahlves	(Switzerland) Ambrosi Hoffmann
25 January 2004	Kitzbühel	Austria	SL	(Finland) Kalle Palander	(Canada) Thomas Grandi	(Austria) Rainer Schönfelder
25 January 2004	Kitzbühel	Austria	K	(United States) Bode Miller	(Austria) Benjamin Raich	(Norway) Lasse Kjus
27 January 2004	Schladming	Austria	SL	(Austria) Benjamin Raich	(Italy) Manfred Mölgg	(Finland) Kalle Palander
30 January 2004	Garmisch-Partenkirchen	Germany	DH	(Switzerland) Didier Cuche	(United States) Daron Rahlves	(Austria) Stephan Eberharter
31 January 2004	Garmisch-Partenkirchen	Germany	DH	(Austria) Stephan Eberharter	(Austria) Fritz Strobl	(Italy) Alessandro Fattori
1 February 2004	Garmisch-Partenkirchen	Germany	SG	(Austria) Hermann Maier	(France) Pierre-Emmanuel Dalcin	(Switzerland) Tobias Grünenfelder
7 February 2004	Adelboden	Switzerland	GS	(Finland) Kalle Palander	(Italy) Massimiliano Blardone	(Austria) Christoph Gruber (Austria) Heinz Schilchegger
8 February 2004	Adelboden	Switzerland	SL	(Austria) Rainer Schönfelder	(United States) Bode Miller	(Austria) Benjamin Raich
14 February 2004	Sankt Anton am Arlberg	Austria	DH	(Austria) Hermann Maier	(Austria) Stephan Eberharter	(Austria) Hans Grugger
15 February 2004	Sankt Anton am Arlberg	Austria	SL	(United States) Bode Miller	(Finland) Kalle Palander	(Austria) Mario Matt
28 February 2004	Kranjska Gora	Slovenia	GS	(United States) Bode Miller	(Italy) Alberto Schieppati	(Italy) Alexander Ploner
29 February 2004	Kranjska Gora	Slovenia	SL	(Norway) Truls Ove Karlsen	(Norway) Tom Stiansen	(Austria) Mario Matt
6 March 2004	Kvitfjell	Norway	DH	(Austria) Stephan Eberharter	(Austria) Fritz Strobl	(France) Antoine Dénériaz
7 March 2004	Kvitfjell	Norway	SG	(United States) Daron Rahlves	(Norway) Bjarne Solbakken	(Austria) Hermann Maier
10 March 2004	Sestriere	Italy	DH	(United States) Daron Rahlves	(Austria) Fritz Strobl	(Austria) Stephan Eberharter
11 March 2004	Sestriere	Italy	SG	(Austria) Hermann Maier	(Austria) Stephan Eberharter	(Austria) Christoph Gruber
~~12 March 2004~~	Sestriere	Italy	GS	cancelled after 1st run due to bad weather conditions		
14 March 2004	Sestriere	Italy	SL	(Finland) Kalle Palander	(Austria) Rainer Schönfelder	(Austria) Manfred Pranger

Note:

At the World Cup finals in Sestriere only the best racers were allowed to compete and only the best 15 finishers were awarded with points.

=== Men's Overall Results ===
see complete table

Place	Name	Country	Total points
1	Hermann Maier	Austria	1265
2	Stephan Eberharter	Austria	1223
3	Benjamin Raich	Austria	1139
4	Bode Miller	United States	1134
5	Daron Rahlves	United States	1004
6	Kalle Palander	Finland	944
7	Michael Walchhofer	Austria	828
8	Lasse Kjus	Norway	824
9	Hans Knauß	Austria	796
10	Rainer Schönfelder	Austria	727

=== Men's Downhill Results ===
see complete table

In men's downhill World Cup 2003/04 all results count. Stephan Eberharter won his third Downhill World Cup in a row.

Place	Name	Country	Total points	4 (Canada)	6 (United States)	7 (United States)	12 (Italy)	16 (France)	20 (Austria)	22 (Austria)	26 (Germany)	27 (Germany)	31 (Austria)	35 (Norway)	37 (Italy)
1	Stephan Eberharter	Austria	831	9	80	22	40	100	80	100	60	100	80	100	60
2	Daron Rahlves	United States	627	13	100	50	36	16	60	80	80	18	24	50	100
3	Hermann Maier	Austria	537	29	45	100	45	20	50	29	45	45	100	29	-
4	Fritz Strobl	Austria	512	14	5	29	50	40	29	26	50	80	29	80	80
5	Michael Walchhofer	Austria	503	100	50	40	80	60	15	45	-	15	40	13	45
6	Hans Knauß	Austria	421	45	-	80	60	14	45	50	26	16	40	45	-
7	Antoine Dénériaz	France	367	60	7	-	100	26	18	15	26	7	16	60	32
8	Ambrosi Hoffmann	Switzerland	317	32	6	9	14	5	40	60	32	13	20	36	50
9	Lasse Kjus	Norway	316	40	40	18	14	80	100	24	-	-	-	-	-
	Didier Cuche	Switzerland	316	-	11	-	20	26	14	36	100	29	26	32	22

=== Men's Super G Results ===
see complete table

In men's Super G World Cup 2003/04 all results count. Hermann Maier won his fifth Super G World Cup. This record is still unbeaten.

Place	Name	Country	Total points	5 (Canada)	8 (United States)	11 (Italy)	21 (Austria)	28 (Germany)	36 (Norway)	38 (Italy)
1	Hermann Maier	Austria	580	100	80	60	80	100	60	100
2	Daron Rahlves	United States	340	26	22	50	100	20	100	22
3	Stephan Eberharter	Austria	312	60	12	80	29	29	22	80
4	Bjarne Solbakken	Norway	298	36	100	22	13	18	80	29
5	Michael Walchhofer	Austria	243	80	-	26	60	-	45	32
6	Hans Knauß	Austria	237	7	60	50	16	24	40	40
7	Lasse Kjus	Norway	230	45	40	100	45	-	-	-
8	Benjamin Raich	Austria	215	50	24	32	9	-	50	50
9	Andreas Schifferer	Austria	212	-	36	20	50	50	32	24
10	Didier Cuche	Switzerland	211	-	45	36	32	40	18	40

=== Men's giant slalom Results ===
see complete table

In men's giant slalom World Cup 2003/04 all results count.

Place	Name	Country	Total points	1 (Austria)	2 (United States)	9 (Italy)	13 (Italy)	14 (Austria)	29 (Switzerland)	33 (Slovenia)
1	Bode Miller	United States	410	100	100	50	60	-	-	100
2	Kalle Palander	Finland	349	24	45	100	80	-	100	-
3	Massimiliano Blardone	Italy	266	16	40	-	50	80	80	-
4	Benjamin Raich	Austria	255	45	18	26	45	100	7	14
5	Davide Simoncelli	Italy	238	-	-	80	100	36	9	13
6	Heinz Schilchegger	Austria	210	40	24	22	16	32	60	16
7	Frédéric Covili	France	190	80	50	60	-	-	-	-
8	Joël Chenal	France	187	60	14	13	26	5	45	24
9	Andreas Schifferer	Austria	186	29	80	32	11	22	-	12
10	Christoph Gruber	Austria	181	-	7	24	-	50	60	40

=== Men's slalom Results ===
see complete table

In men's slalom World Cup 2003/04 the all results count. Rainer Schönfelder won the cup with only one win.

Place	Name	Country	Total points	3 (United States)	10 (Italy)	15 (Austria)	17 (France)	19 (Switzerland)	23 (Austria)	25 (Austria)	30 (Switzerland)	32 (Austria)	34 (Slovenia)	39 (Italy)
1	Rainer Schönfelder	Austria	630	80	40	-	50	80	60	45	100	50	45	80
2	Kalle Palander	Finland	595	100	-	100	15	-	100	60	-	80	40	100
3	Benjamin Raich	Austria	468	29	50	50	13	100	40	100	60	-	-	26
4	Giorgio Rocca	Italy	429	50	80	60	100	-	20	-	32	36	29	22
5	Bode Miller	United States	376	-	-	-	60	-	50	50	80	100	-	36
6	Mario Matt	Austria	352	20	20	-	22	40	40	-	50	60	60	40
7	Manfred Pranger	Austria	347	60	60	80	40	-	-	36	-	11	-	60
8	Truls Ove Karlsen	Norway	262	18	-	7	-	20	32	13	-	40	100	32
9	Manfred Mölgg	Italy	236	-	45	45	18	-	12	80	-	36	-	-
10	Thomas Grandi	Canada	221	-	12	18	15	45	80	-	-	26	9	16
11	Akira Sasaki	Japan	216	22	-	-	29	-	-	14	36	20	50	45
	Tom Stiansen	Norway	216	32	13	20	-	8	-	-	26	8	80	29
13	Silvan Zurbriggen	Switzerland	210	36	24	26	2	29	45	-	-	18	10	20
14	Ivica Kostelić	Croatia	195	-	100	-	9	60	26	-	-	-	-	-

=== Men's Combined Results ===
see complete table

In men's Combined World Cup 2003/04 both results count.

Place	Name	Country	Total points	18 (France)	24 (Austria)
1	Bode Miller	United States	200	100	100
2	Benjamin Raich	Austria	160	80	80
3	Lasse Kjus	Norway	120	60	60
4	Pierrick Bourgeat	France	90	50	40
5	Michael Walchhofer	Austria	82	32	50
6	Aksel Lund Svindal	Norway	77	45	32
7	Silvan Zurbriggen	Switzerland	74	29	45
8	Ondřej Bank	Czech Republic	42	18	24
9	Andrej Šporn	Slovenia	40	40	-
10	Ambrosi Hoffmann	Switzerland	38	16	22
	Hermann Maier	Austria	38	20	18
	Didier Cuche	Switzerland	38	22	16

== Women ==
=== Race results ===
Date	Location	Nation	Disc.	Winner	Second	Third
25 October 2003	Sölden	Austria	GS	(Germany) Martina Ertl	(Sweden) Anja Pärson	(Spain) María José Rienda Contreras
28 November 2003	Park City	United States	GS	(Sweden) Anja Pärson	(Austria) Nicole Hosp	(Italy) Denise Karbon
29 November 2003	Park City	United States	SL	(Sweden) Anja Pärson	(Switzerland) Sonja Nef	(Austria) Marlies Schild
5 December 2003	Lake Louise	Canada	DH	(France) Carole Montillet	(Germany) Hilde Gerg	(United States) Kirsten Clark
6 December 2003	Lake Louise	Canada	DH	(France) Carole Montillet	(Austria) Michaela Dorfmeister	(Austria) Renate Götschl
7 December 2003	Lake Louise	Canada	SG	(Austria) Renate Götschl	(Austria) Michaela Dorfmeister	(Germany) Hilde Gerg
13 December 2003	Alta Badia	Italy	GS	(Italy) Denise Karbon	(Austria) Nicole Hosp	(Austria) Elisabeth Görgl
16 December 2003	Madonna di Campiglio	Italy	SL	(Sweden) Anja Pärson	(France) Laure Pequegnot	(Austria) Nicole Hosp
17 December 2003	Madonna di Campiglio	Italy	SL	(Austria) Nicole Hosp	(Sweden) Anja Pärson	(Austria) Marlies Schild
20 December 2003	St. Moritz	Switzerland	DH	(Austria) Renate Götschl	(Germany) Hilde Gerg	(Germany) Maria Riesch
27 December 2003	Lienz	Austria	GS	(Austria) Nicole Hosp	(Austria) Renate Götschl	(United States) Kirsten Clark
28 December 2003	Lienz	Austria	SL	(Sweden) Anja Pärson	(Austria) Nicole Hosp	(Germany) Monika Bergmann
4 January 2004	Megève	France	SG	(Austria) Alexandra Meissnitzer	(Austria) Renate Götschl	(Austria) Michaela Dorfmeister
5 January 2004	Megève	France	SL	(Sweden) Anja Pärson	(Austria) Marlies Schild	(Germany) Monika Bergmann (Germany) Martina Ertl
10 January 2004	Veysonnaz	Switzerland	DH	(Austria) Renate Götschl	(Austria) Michaela Dorfmeister (Germany) Hilde Gerg	
11 January 2004	Veysonnaz	Switzerland	SG	(Germany) Hilde Gerg	(Austria) Michaela Dorfmeister	(Austria) Silvia Berger
14 January 2004	Cortina d'Ampezzo	Italy	SG	(Canada) Geneviève Simard	(Germany) Maria Riesch	(Germany) Hilde Gerg
16 January 2004	Cortina d'Ampezzo	Italy	SG	(Austria) Renate Götschl	(Germany) Martina Ertl	(Germany) Hilde Gerg
17 January 2004	Cortina d'Ampezzo	Italy	DH	(Germany) Hilde Gerg	(Austria) Renate Götschl	(France) Carole Montillet
18 January 2004	Cortina d'Ampezzo	Italy	DH	(France) Carole Montillet	(Austria) Renate Götschl	(United States) Lindsey Kildow
24 January 2004	Maribor	Slovenia	GS	(Sweden) Anja Pärson	(Austria) Michaela Dorfmeister	(Spain) María José Rienda Contreras
25 January 2004	Maribor	Slovenia	SL	(Sweden) Anja Pärson	(Austria) Marlies Schild	(Austria) Nicole Hosp
30 January 2004	Haus	Austria	DH	(Germany) Maria Riesch	(Italy) Isolde Kostner	(Austria) Renate Götschl
31 January 2004	Haus	Austria	DH	(Italy) Isolde Kostner	(Austria) Renate Götschl	(Switzerland) Fränzi Aufdenblatten
1 February 2004	Haus	Austria	SG	(France) Carole Montillet (Germany) Maria Riesch		(Austria) Michaela Dorfmeister
7 February 2004	Zwiesel	Germany	GS	(Sweden) Anja Pärson	(Slovenia) Tina Maze	(Austria) Renate Götschl
8 February 2004	Zwiesel	Germany	SL	(Sweden) Anja Pärson	(Germany) Monika Bergmann	(Slovakia) Veronika Zuzulová
21 February 2004	Åre	Sweden	SG	(Austria) Renate Götschl	(France) Carole Montillet	(Austria) Brigitte Obermoser
22 February 2004	Åre	Sweden	GS	(Sweden) Anja Pärson	(Spain) María José Rienda Contreras	(Austria) Elisabeth Görgl
28 February 2004	Levi	Finland	SL	(Finland) Tanja Poutiainen	(Austria) Elisabeth Görgl	(Germany) Maria Riesch
29 February 2004	Levi	Finland	SL	(Germany) Maria Riesch	(Austria) Elisabeth Görgl	(Germany) Martina Ertl
10 March 2004	Sestriere	Italy	DH	(Austria) Renate Götschl	(Switzerland) Sylviane Berthod	(Italy) Isolde Kostner
11 March 2004	Sestriere	Italy	SG	(Switzerland) Nadia Styger	(Germany) Maria Riesch	(Austria) Michaela Dorfmeister
13 March 2004	Sestriere	Italy	SL	(Austria) Marlies Schild	(United States) Sarah Schleper	(Finland) Tanja Poutiainen
14 March 2004	Sestriere	Italy	GS	(Sweden) Anja Pärson	(Italy) Denise Karbon	(Austria) Alexandra Meissnitzer

Note:

At the World Cup finals in Sestriere only the best racers were allowed to compete and only the best 15 finishers were awarded with points.

=== Women's Overall Results ===
see complete table

Place	Name	Country	Total points
1	Anja Pärson	Sweden	1561
2	Renate Götschl	Austria	1344
3	Maria Riesch	Germany	977
4	Hilde Gerg	Germany	962
5	Carole Montillet	France	957
6	Michaela Dorfmeister	Austria	943
7	Martina Ertl	Germany	770
8	Alexandra Meissnitzer	Austria	734
9	Tanja Poutiainen	Finland	669
10	Elisabeth Görgl	Austria	654

=== Women's Downhill Results ===
see complete table

In women's downhill World Cup 2003/04 all results count. Renate Götschl won her third Downhill World Cup.

Place	Name	Country	Total points	4 (Canada)	5 (Canada)	10 (Switzerland)	15 (Switzerland)	19 (Italy)	20 (Italy)	23 (Austria)	24 (Austria)	32 (Italy)
1	Renate Götschl	Austria	680	20	60	100	100	80	80	60	80	100
2	Hilde Gerg	Germany	546	80	45	80	80	100	50	50	32	29
3	Carole Montillet	France	492	100	100	36	20	60	100	36	16	24
4	Isolde Kostner	Italy	348	2	24	2	18	36	26	80	100	60
5	Michaela Dorfmeister	Austria	334	13	80	32	80	50	32	29	18	-
6	Sylviane Berthod	Switzerland	300	50	3	29	36	26	18	22	36	80
7	Maria Riesch	Germany	283	32	29	60	2	24	14	100	-	22
8	Nadia Styger	Switzerland	252	1	20	50	24	32	40	40	13	32
9	Kirsten Clark	United States	228	60	18	15	50	40	45	-	-	-
10	Alexandra Meissnitzer	Austria	225	36	40	24	40	-	24	14	11	36

=== Women's Super G Results ===
see complete table

In women's Super G World Cup 2003/04 all results count.

Place	Name	Country	Total points	6 (Canada)	13 (France)	16 (Switzerland)	17 (Italy)	18 (Italy)	25 (Austria)	28 (Sweden)	33 (Italy)
1	Renate Götschl	Austria	467	100	80	-	36	100	15	100	36
2	Carole Montillet	France	402	32	50	45	45	50	100	80	-
3	Michaela Dorfmeister	Austria	391	80	60	80	6	13	60	32	60
4	Hilde Gerg	Germany	390	60	45	100	60	60	20	-	45
5	Maria Riesch	Germany	338	22	-	20	80	36	100	-	80
6	Nadia Styger	Switzerland	292	45	-	32	40	26	13	36	100
7	Alexandra Meissnitzer	Austria	267	3	100	36	22	32	45	-	29
8	Silvia Berger	Austria	219	8	24	60	9	16	12	40	50
9	Mélanie Suchet	Switzerland	207	10	36	10	26	40	40	45	-
10	Brigitte Obermoser	Austria	195	-	8	26	14	5	50	60	32
11	Caroline Lalive	United States	178	16	26	24	50	22	44	29	-
12	Geneviève Simard	Canada	177	6	1	40	100	-	18	12	-

=== Women's giant slalom Results ===
see complete table

In women's giant slalom World Cup 2003/04 all results count.

Place	Name	Country	Total points	1 (Austria)	2 (United States)	7 (Italy)	11 (Austria)	21 (Slovenia)	26 (Germany)	29 (Sweden)	35 (Italy)
1	Anja Pärson	Sweden	630	80	100	50	-	100	100	100	100
2	Denise Karbon	Italy	343	24	60	100	-	11	18	50	80
3	María José Rienda Contreras	Spain	339	60	36	-	40	60	13	80	50
4	Elisabeth Görgl	Austria	293	20	45	60	-	32	36	60	40
5	Tanja Poutiainen	Finland	279	45	9	40	45	36	40	32	32
6	Nicole Hosp	Austria	260	-	80	80	100	-	-	-	-
7	Alexandra Meissnitzer	Austria	242	32	40	29	26	26	29	-	60
8	Tina Maze	Slovenia	234	50	2	26	29	7	80	18	32
9	Martina Ertl	Germany	230	100	32	-	50	-	-	24	24
10	Michaela Dorfmeister	Austria	218	4	5	15	24	80	50	14	26

=== Women's slalom Results ===
see complete table

In women's slalom World Cup 2003/04 all results count.

Place	Name	Country	Total points	3 (United States)	8 (Italy)	9 (Italy)	12 (Austria)	14 (France)	22 (Slovenia)	27 (Germany)	30 (Finland)	31 (Finland)	34 (Italy)
1	Anja Pärson	Sweden	770	100	100	80	100	100	100	100	50	-	40
2	Marlies Schild	Austria	447	60	36	60	9	80	80	-	-	22	100
3	Monika Bergmann-Schmuderer	Germany	437	-	20	45	60	60	50	80	32	45	45
4	Tanja Poutiainen	Finland	390	36	32	40	29	8	45	-	100	40	60
5	Elisabeth Görgl	Austria	339	-	9	50	-	36	16	36	80	80	32
6	Nicole Hosp	Austria	306	-	60	100	80	6	60	-	-	-	-
7	Martina Ertl	Germany	299	45	29	32	24	60	-	9	40	60	-
8	Kristina Koznick	United States	297	26	45	29	-	40	14	26	45	50	22
9	Maria Riesch	Germany	245	-	5	10	-	20	-	-	60	100	50
10	Šárka Záhrobská	Czech Republic	244	40	18	16	-	32	-	45	40	29	24

=== Women's Combined Results ===
No competition was held.
