= Antoine Dénériaz =

French alpine skier (born 1976)

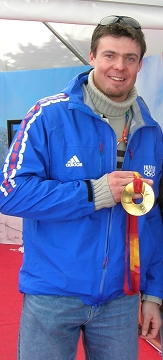

Personal information
- Born: 6 March 1976 (age 50) Bonneville, Haute-Savoie, France
- Height: 1.89 m (6 ft 2 in)

Skiing career
- Sport: Alpine skiing
- Retired: 2007 (age 31)
- Disciplines: Downhill, Super G, Combined
- World Cup debut: 15 December 1996 (age 20)

Olympics
- Teams: 2 – (2002, 2006)
- Medals: 1 (1 gold)

World Championships
- Teams: 3 – (1999, 2003, 2007)
- Medals: 0

World Cup
- Seasons: 9 – (1999–2007)
- Wins: 3 – (3 DH)
- Podiums: 6 – (6 DH)
- Overall titles: 0 – (20th in 2004)
- Discipline titles: 0 – (6th in DH, 2003)
Medal record
Men's alpine skiing
Representing France
Olympic Games
| Gold medal – first place | 2006 Turin | Downhill |

Antoine Dénériaz (born 6 March 1976) is a retired French World Cup alpine ski racer. He specialized in the speed events of downhill and super-G and is an Olympic gold medalist.

Dénériaz had three World Cup wins and six podiums, all in downhill. His first two podiums were both victories, at Val Gardena and Kvitfjell, during the 2003 season. He won his Olympic gold medal in the downhill at the 2006 Winter Olympics in Turin, Italy, trailed by Austrian Michael Walchhofer and Swiss Bruno Kernen. He also competed in the super-G, where he placed eleventh.

Dénériaz's hometown is Morillon, an alpine village not far from Mont Blanc. He is married to former New Zealand alpine ski racer Claudia Riegler.

== World Cup results ==
=== Season standings ===
| Season | Age | Overall | Slalom | Giant slalom | Super-G | Downhill | Combined |
|---|---|---|---|---|---|---|---|
| 1999 | 22 | 45 | — | — | 36 | 21 | 14 |
| 2000 | 23 | 71 | — | — | — | 34 | 10 |
| 2001 | 24 | 109 | — | — | — | 47 | — |
| 2002 | 25 | 41 | — | — | — | 18 | 14 |
| 2003 | 26 | 25 | — | — | 51 | 6 | — |
| 2004 | 27 | 20 | — | — | 47 | 7 | — |
| 2005 | 28 | 40 | — | — | 33 | 17 | — |
| 2006 | 29 | 45 | — | — | 28 | 20 | — |
| 2007 | 30 | 71 | — | — | 16 | 55 | — |

=== Race podiums ===
- 3 wins – (3 DH)
- 6 podiums – (6 DH)

| Season | Date | Location | Discipline | Place |
|---|---|---|---|---|
| 2003 | 21 Dec 2002 | Val Gardena, Italy | Downhill | 1st |
| 2003 | 12 Mar 2003 | Kvitfjell, Norway | Downhill | 1st |
| 2004 | 29 Nov 2003 | Lake Louise, Canada | Downhill | 3rd |
| 2004 | 20 Dec 2003 | Val Gardena, Italy | Downhill | 1st |
| 2004 | 12 Mar 2003 | Kvitfjell, Norway | Downhill | 3rd |
| 2005 | 27 Nov 2004 | Lake Louise, Canada | Downhill | 2nd |

== World Championship results ==
| Year | Age | Slalom | Giant Slalom | Super-G | Downhill | Combined |
|---|---|---|---|---|---|---|
| 1999 | 22 | — | — | — | 21 | — |
| 2001 | 24 | — | — | — | — | — |
| 2003 | 26 | — | — | — | 8 | — |
| 2005 | 28 | — | — | — | — | — |
| 2007 | 30 | — | — | 29 | 33 | — |

== Olympic results ==
| Year | Age | Slalom | Giant Slalom | Super-G | Downhill | Combined |
|---|---|---|---|---|---|---|
| 2002 | 25 | — | — | — | 12 | 21 |
| 2006 | 29 | — | — | 11 | 1 | — |
