= FIS Alpine World Ski Championships 2005 =

Skiing event in Bormio, Italy

Coordinates: 46.467°N 10.367°E

38th FIS Alpine World Ski Championships
- Host city: Bormio and Santa Caterina, Italy
- Events: 11
- Opening: 28 January 2005
- Closing: 13 February 2005
- Opened by: Carlo Azeglio Ciampi

Location in Italy
Location in the Alps of Europe

The FIS Alpine World Ski Championships 2005 were held from January 28 to February 13 in Bormio, Italy. The women's competition was held in neighboring Santa Caterina.

Bormio previously hosted the World Championships in 1985; other host cities in Italy include Cortina d'Ampezzo (1932, 1941 (unofficial), and 1956 (Winter Olympics)), Val Gardena (1970), and Sestriere (1997).

In northern Italy, Bormio is a regular stop on the World Cup circuit, usually for a men's downhill in late December. The Pista Stelvio is among the longest and most challenging downhill courses in the world, with a vertical drop exceeding 1,000 metres (3,280 ft).

These were the last World Championships to use the traditional combined (K) format (one downhill run and two slalom runs). Starting in 2007, the world championships switched to the "super-combined" (SC) format (one run each of downhill & slalom) for the combined event. First run on the World Cup circuit in 2005 at Wengen, the "super-combi" format made its debut at the Winter Olympics in 2010.

== Men's events ==
=== Men's downhill ===
Date: February 5

Placing	Country	Athlete	Time
1	United States	Bode Miller	1:56.22
2	United States	Daron Rahlves	1:56.66
3	Austria	Michael Walchhofer	1:57.09
4	Austria	Fritz Strobl	1:57.17
5	Switzerland	Bruno Kernen	1:57.25
6	Switzerland	Didier Défago	1:57.37

=== Men's super-G ===
Date: January 29

Placing	Country	Athlete	Time
1	United States	Bode Miller	1:27.55
2	Austria	Michael Walchhofer	1:27.69
3	Austria	Benjamin Raich	1:28.23
4	Austria	Hermann Maier	1:28.40
5	Liechtenstein	Marco Büchel	1:28.61
6	Germany	Florian Eckert	1:28.69

=== Men's giant slalom ===
Date: February 10

Placing	Country	Athlete	Time	Run 1	Run 2
1	Austria	Hermann Maier	2:50.41	1:25.05	1:25.36
2	Austria	Benjamin Raich	2:50.66	1:25.90	1:24.76
3	United States	Daron Rahlves	2:51.09	1:24.45	1:26.64
4	Finland	Kalle Palander	2:51.45	1:25.44	1:26.01
5	Canada	Thomas Grandi	2:51.82	1:26.03	1:25.79
6	Norway	Aksel Lund Svindal	2:51.99	1:26.03	1:25.96

=== Men's slalom ===
Date: February 12

Placing	Country	Athlete	Time	Run 1	Run 2
1	Austria	Benjamin Raich	1:41.34	52.02	49.32
2	Austria	Rainer Schönfelder	1:41.58	52.76	48.82
3	Italy	Giorgio Rocca	1:42.08	52.22	49.86
4	Sweden	Markus Larsson	1:42.48	52.99	49.49
5	Sweden	André Myhrer	1:42.72	53.33	49.39
6	Canada	Thomas Grandi	1:42.76	53.02	49.74

=== Men's combination ===
Date: February 3

Placing	Country	Athlete	Time	Downhill	Slalom
1	Austria	Benjamin Raich	3:19.10	1:53.41	1:25.69
2	Norway	Aksel Lund Svindal	3:20.01	1:53.70	1:26.31
3	Italy	Giorgio Rocca	3:20.08	1:54.30	1:25.78
4	Austria	Michael Walchhofer	3:20.55	1:51.76	1:28.79
5	Switzerland	Silvan Zurbriggen	3:20.98	1:53.95	1:27.03
6	Norway	Lasse Kjus	3:21.34	1:53.76	1:27.58

== Women's events ==
=== Women's downhill ===
Date: February 6

Placing	Country	Athlete	Time
1	Croatia	Janica Kostelić	1:39.90
2	Italy	Elena Fanchini	1:40.16
3	Austria	Renate Götschl	1:40.29
4	United States	Lindsey C. Kildow	1:40.52
5	France	Ingrid Jacquemod	1:40.86
6	Sweden	Jessica Lindell-Vikarby	1:40.98

=== Women's super-G ===
Date: January 30

Placing	Country	Athlete	Time
1	Sweden	Anja Pärson	1:17.64
2	Italy	Lucia Recchia	1:18.09
3	United States	Julia Mancuso	1:18.40
4	Italy	Nadia Fanchini	1:18.43
5	Italy	Isolde Kostner	1:18.54
6	Slovenia	Tina Maze	1:18.67

=== Women's giant slalom ===
Date: February 8

Placing	Country	Athlete	Time	Run 1	Run 2
1	Sweden	Anja Pärson	2:13,63	1:07.07	1:06.56
2	Finland	Tanja Poutiainen	2:13,82	1:07.43	1:06.39
3	United States	Julia Mancuso	2:14,27	1:07.79	1:06.48
4	Germany	Martina Ertl	2:14,31	1:07.68	1:06.63
5	Austria	Nicole Hosp	2:14,38	1:07.39	1:06.99
6	Italy	Karen Putzer	2:14,84	1:07.62	1:07.22

=== Women's slalom ===
Date: February 11

Placing	Country	Athlete	Time	Run 1	Run 2
1	Croatia	Janica Kostelić	1:47,98	51.59	56.39
2	Finland	Tanja Poutiainen	1:48,16	51.19	56.97
3	Czech Republic	Šárka Záhrobská	1:48,65	51.90	56.75
4	Austria	Kathrin Zettel	1:48.82	52.52	56.30
5	Sweden	Therese Borssén	1:49.02	52.93	56.09
6	United States	Resi Stiegler	1:49.27	52.97	56.30

=== Women's combination ===
Date: February 4

Placing	Country	Athlete	Time	Downhill	Slalom
1	Croatia	Janica Kostelić	2:53.70	1:31.31	1:22.39
2	Sweden	Anja Pärson	2:55.15	1:31.97	1:23.18
3	Austria	Marlies Schild	2:56.40	1:33.62	1:22.78
4	United States	Lindsey C. Kildow	2:56.60	1:32.01	1:24.59
5	Czech Republic	Šárka Záhrobská	2:56.89	1:33.53	1:23.36
6	Austria	Kathrin Zettel	2:57.44	1:33.74	1:23.70

== Team event ==
=== Nations' team award ===
Date: February 13

This competition was held for the first time in these world championships. Six athletes of a country, including at least two men and two women, start in a total of four super G and four slalom runs. Each country sends one athlete into each run, men's and women's runs taking turns. The placings of all eight competitions are added and the country with the lowest number wins. If an athlete doesn't finish a run, the country receives 9 points.

Placing	Country	Athletes	SG1 SL1	SG2 SL2	SG3 SL3	SG4 SL4	Total Points
1	Germany	Monika Bergmann-Schmuderer, Andreas Ertl, Martina Ertl, Florian Eckert, Hilde Gerg, Felix Neureuther	2; 3	2; 1	1; 1	7; 9	26
2	Austria	Nicole Hosp, Renate Götschl, Benjamin Raich, Rainer Schönfelder, Michael Walchhofer, Kathrin Zettel	5; 9	3; 5	2; 2	2; 1	29
3	France	Pierrick Bourgeat, Ingrid Jacquemod, Carole Montillet, Christel Pascal, Laure Péquegnot, Jean-Pierre Vidal	3; 7	9; 2	3; 4	5; 5	38
4	United States	Lindsey C. Kildow, Ted Ligety, Julia Mancuso, Bode Miller, Daron Rahlves, Sarah Schleper	9; 2	1; 9	9; 5	1; 3	39
5	Canada	Brigitte Acton, Patrick Biggs, François Bourque, Emily Brydon, Thomas Grandi, Erik Guay	3; 3	4; 9	6; 6	3; 8	42
6	Switzerland	Daniel Albrecht, Fränzi Aufdenblatten, Didier Défago, Sonja Nef, Nadia Styger, Silvan Zurbriggen	9; 1	5; 6	4; 9	6; 6	46
7	Sweden	Therese Borssén, Janette Hargin, Patrik Järbyn, Markus Larsson, André Myhrer, Anja Pärson	9; 5	8; 3	9; 3	9; 2	48
8	Italy	Chiara Costazza, Nadia Fanchini, Peter Fill, Manfred Mölgg, Karen Putzer, Giorgio Rocca	1; 9	6; 4	9; 9	8; 4	50
9	Slovenia	Mitja Dragšič, Aleš Gorza, Jure Košir, Tina Maze, Urška Rabić, Andrej Šporn	9; 6	7; 7	5; 9	4; 7	54

== Medal table ==
* Host nation (Italy)

Rank	Nation	Gold	Silver	Bronze	Total
1	Austria (AUT)	3	4	4	11
2	Croatia (CRO)	3	0	0	3
3	United States (USA)	2	1	3	6
4	Sweden (SWE)	2	1	0	3
5	Germany (GER)	1	0	0	1
6	Italy (ITA)*	0	2	2	4
7	Finland (FIN)	0	2	0	2
8	Norway (NOR)	0	1	0	1
9	Czech Republic (CZE)	0	0	1	1
9	France (FRA)	0	0	1	1
Totals (10 entries)		11	11	11	33

== Course information ==
Course Information – (metric)
Date	Race	Start Elevation	Finish Elevation	Vertical Drop	Course Length	Average Gradient
Sat 05-Feb	Downhill – men	2255 m	1268 m	987 m	3.186 km	31.0%
Sun 06-Feb	Downhill – women	2530	1745	785	2.901	27.1
Thu 03-Feb	Downhill – (K) – men	2160	1268	892	2.926	30.5
Fri 04-Feb	Downhill – (K) – women	2415	1745	670	2.606	25.7
Sat 29-Jan	Super-G – men	1907	1268	639	2.091	30.6
Sun 30-Jan	Super-G – women	2335	1745	590	1.993	29.6
Wed 09-Feb	Giant Slalom – men	1696	1251	445
Tue 08-Feb	Giant Slalom – women	2110	1730	380
Sat 12-Feb	Slalom – men	1470	1251	219
Fri 11-Feb	Slalom – women	1900	1730	170
Thu 03-Feb	Slalom – (K) – men	1435	1251	184
Fri 04-Feb	Slalom – (K) – women	1890	1730	160
Sun 13-Feb	Team	1696	1268	428	1.536	27.9

Course Information – (imperial)
Date	Race	Start Elevation	Finish Elevation	Vertical Drop	Course Length	Average Gradient
Sat 05-Feb	Downhill – men	7398 ft	4160 ft	3238 ft	1.980 mi.	31.0%
Sun 06-Feb	Downhill – women	8300	5725	2575	1.803	27.1
Thu 03-Feb	Downhill – (K) – men	7087	4160	2927	1.818	30.5
Fri 04-Feb	Downhill – (K) – women	7923	5725	2198	1.619	25.7
Sat 29-Jan	Super-G – men	6256	4160	2096	1.299	30.6
Sun 30-Jan	Super-G – women	7661	5725	1936	1.238	29.6
Wed 09-Feb	Giant Slalom – men	5564	4104	1460
Tue 08-Feb	Giant Slalom – women	6923	5676	1247
Sat 12-Feb	Slalom – men	4823	4104	719
Fri 11-Feb	Slalom – women	6234	5676	558
Thu 03-Feb	Slalom – (K) – men	4708	4104	604
Fri 04-Feb	Slalom – (K) – women	6201	5676	525
Sun 13-Feb	Team	5564	4160	1404	0.954	27.9
