= Florian Eckert =

German alpine skier (born 1979)

Florian Eckert (born 1979) is a retired German alpine skier who won a gold medal with the national team at the team event at the 2005 Alpine World Ski Championships.

== Career ==
He competed in four events each at the 1996, 1997, 1998 and 1999 Junior World Championships, winning the bronze medal in slalom at the 1997 edition. At the FIS Alpine World Ski Championships 2001 he won the bronze medal in downhill, in addition to a 17th place in super-G. At the 2005 World Championships he finished 6th in super-G and 12th in downhill.

He made his World Cup debut in November 1999. In his second race that season, he collected his first World Cup points with a 28th place in Garmisch-Partenkirchen. At the start of the 2000–01 season he improved to a 27th place, then an 18th place in December 2000 in Val d'Isere. At the season closer in Kvitfjell, he suddenly finished 2nd in both downhill races. He finished once more among the top 10, namely 9th in November 2004 in Lake Louise. His last World Cup outing came in March 2005 in Lenzerheide.

He represented the sports club SC Lenggries.
