= Marc Bottollier-Lasquin =

French alpine skier

Marc Bottollier-Lasquin (born 1979) is a retired French alpine skier.

He competed in four events at the 1999 Junior World Championships, an 8th place being his best finish. He later competed at the 2007 World Championships, finishing 15th in the downhill race.

He made his World Cup debut in December 2000 in Val d'Isere, collecting his first World Cup points a week later with a 20th place in the same venue. One year later, again in the same venue, he improved to a 13th place in downhill. This remained his career best until 2006–07, when he first managed an 11th place in Bormio in December 2006 and a 7th place in February 2007 in Garmisch-Partenkirchen. His last World Cup outing came in December 2008 in Beaver Creek.

He represented the sports club SC Combloux.
