= Andreas Buder =

Austrian alpine skier (born 1979)

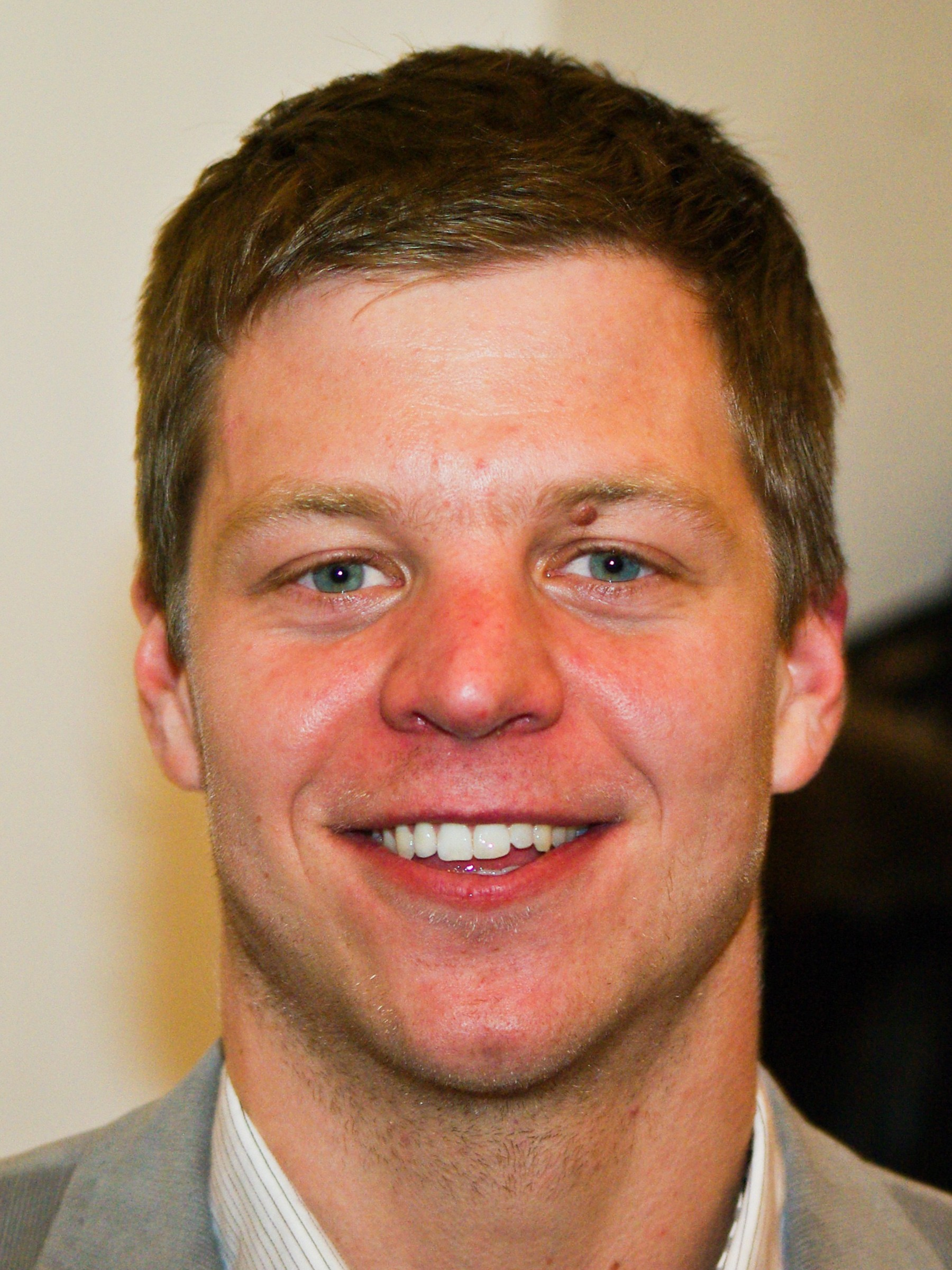
Andreas Buder in 2009

Andreas Buder (born 22 May 1979 in Scheibbs) is an Austrian retired alpine skier.
