= Jürg Grünenfelder =

Swiss alpine skier (born 1974)

Jürg Grünenfelder (born 8 January 1974 in Netstal) is a Swiss former alpine skier who competed in the 1998 Winter Olympics.
