= Konrad Hari =

Swiss alpine skier (born 1978)

Konrad Hari (born 1978) is a retired Swiss alpine skier.

He competed in four events at the 1997 Junior World Championships and four events at the 1998 Junior World Championships, his best placement being the super-G bronze medal in 1998.

He made his World Cup debut in January 1999 in Adelboden, but did not collect his first World Cup points until February 2000 when finishing 24th in the St. Anton super-G. Following several years where he finished 25th–30th at best, he improved to a 12th place in December 2004 in Beaver Creek. In 2005, the latter half of the 2004-05 FIS Alpine Ski World Cup, he recorded four finishes in the 16th–20th interval, later improving further to a 10th place in the January 2006 Kitzbühel downhill. His last World Cup outing came in March 2008 in Kvitfjell.

He represented the sports club in Adelboden.
