= Daron Rahlves =

American alpine skier

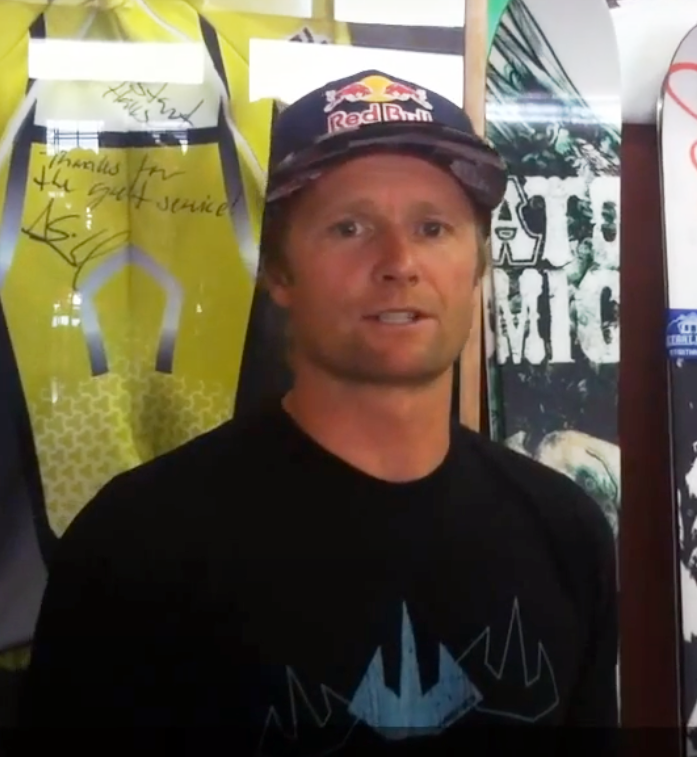
- Rahlves in 2012

Personal information
- Born: June 12, 1973 (age 53) Walnut Creek, California, U.S.
- Height: 1.73 m (5 ft 8 in)
- Website: DaronRahlves.com

Skiing career
- Sport: Alpine skiing
- Club: Sugar Bowl Ski Team
- Retired: March 26, 2006 (age 32) / February 21, 2010 (age 36)
- Disciplines: Downhill, super-G, giant slalom
- World Cup debut: March 13, 1994 (age 20)

Olympics
- Teams: 3 – (1998, 2002, 2006) – alpine 1 – (2010) – freestyle
- Medals: 0

World Championships
- Teams: 6 – (1996–2005)
- Medals: 3 (1 gold)

World Cup
- Seasons: 12 – (1995–2006)
- Wins: 12 – (9 DH, 3 SG)
- Podiums: 28 – (20 DH, 7 SG, 1 GS)
- Overall titles: 0 – (4th in 2006)
- Discipline titles: 0 – (2nd in DH & SG, 2004)
Medal record
Representing the United States
Men's alpine skiing
World Cup race podiums
Event	1st	2nd	3rd
Giant slalom	0	1	0
Downhill	9	4	7
Super-G	3	2	2
Total	12	7	9
World Championships
Gold medal – first place	2001 St. Anton	Super-G
Silver medal – second place	2005 Bormio	Downhill
Bronze medal – third place	2005 Bormio	Giant slalom
Men's freestyle skiing
Winter X Games
Gold medal – first place	2008 Aspen	Ski Cross

Daron Louis Rahlves (born June 12, 1973) is an American former World Cup alpine ski racer and freestyle skier.

== Biography ==
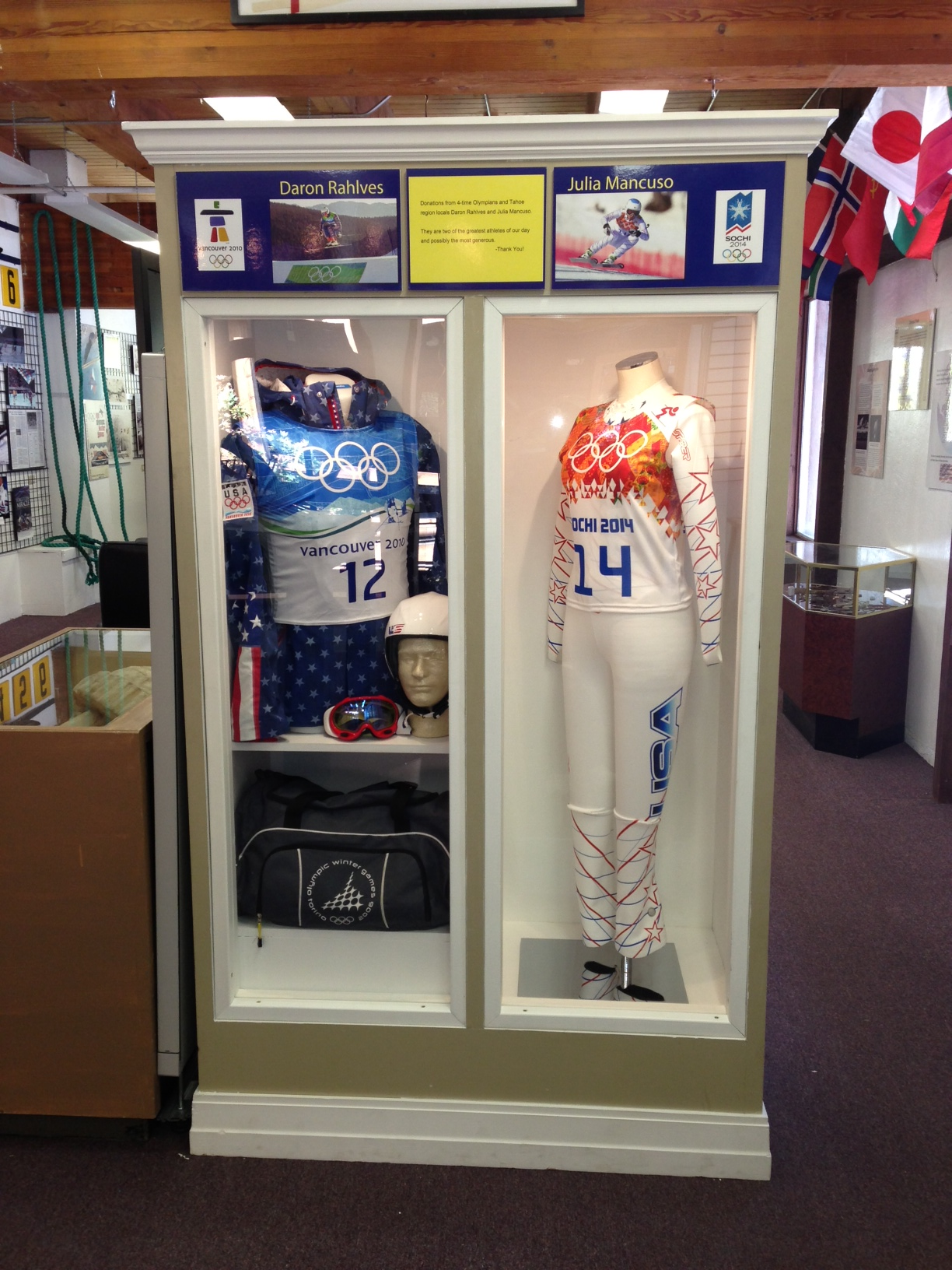
A Rahlves Olympic bib (left) displayed in a museum.

Born in Walnut Creek, California, and raised in Northern California, Rahlves attended the Green Mountain Valley School in Vermont and currently resides in Truckee, California. He retired from racing at the end of the 2006 season with twelve World Cup victories and a world championship.

Rahlves earned three World Championships medals, a gold in 2001 in the super-G and a silver and bronze (downhill and giant slalom) in 2005. His best year in the overall World Cup standings was 2006, when he finished fourth. Rahlves' best years in the downhill standings were 2003 and 2004, when he placed second. He was also the runner-up in the Super G standings in 2004.

Rahlves was named to the U.S. Olympic team as a freestyle skier for the 2010 Winter Olympics in Vancouver. He competed in the ski cross event at Cypress Mountain and placed 24th.

== Personal life ==
Daron is married to Michelle and has twins: son Dreyson and daughter Miley (born in July 2007).

== Movies ==
Rahlves has been featured in several movies as his racing career matured and after retirement. 2005 brought Rahlves' first appearance in Warren Miller's "Impact". In 2007, Rahlves was featured in Rage Films' movie "Enjoy" as well as Jalbert Productions' "The Thin Line: Examination of the downhill" and in 2008 has segments in Warren Miller's "Children of Winter" and again in Rage Film's movie "Down Days". He has also been in Warren Miller's Dynasty and Matchstick Productions' "In Deep in 2009. In 2010 Rahlves starred in Teton Gravity Research's "Light The Wick" and in 2011 Warren Miller's "Like There's No Tomorrow". Rahlves was a featured in Teton Gravity Research's "The Dream Factory". Most recently, Rahlves rode a night scene in Alyeska in which the snow was backlit with array of projected LED colors for Sweetgrass Productions "Afterglow" in 2014.

== Awards and titles ==
- 2001 World Championships in St. Anton, Austria: Gold Medal in Super-G.
- 2003 Hahnenkamm in Kitzbühel, Austria: 1st place in Downhill, the first American champion on the prestigious Streif course in 44 years (Buddy Werner in 1959).
- 2004 Hahnenkamm in Kitzbühel, Austria: 1st place in Super G, becoming the first American champion ever in that race.
- 2005 World Championships in Bormio, Italy: Silver Medal in Downhill behind Bode Miller, completing the first 1-2 finish for American men ever at the Worlds.
  - Bronze Medal in Giant slalom.
- 2006 Lauberhorn in Wengen, Switzerland: 1st place in Downhill (third American to win)
- 12 World Cup victories.
- 7 U.S. National Championships titles

== World Cup results ==
=== Season standings ===
Season	Age	Overall	Slalom	Giant slalom	Super G	Downhill	Combined
1995	21	59	—	—	18	—	—
1996	22	58	—	27	18	—	—
1997	23	47	—	—	11	—	—
1998	24	57	—	—	12	46	—
1999	25	53	—	—	19	32	—
2000	26	20	—	47	10	10	—
2001	27	29	—	38	17	15	—
2002	28	34	—	45	12	19	—
2003	29	6	—	49	24	2	—
2004	30	5	—	33	2	2	—
2005	31	5	—	12	3	4	—
2006	32	4	—	11	3	3	—

=== Race victories ===
- 12 wins – (9 DH, 3 SG)
- 28 podiums – (20 DH, 7 SG, 1 GS), 73 top tens

Season	Date	Location	Discipline
2000	3 Mar 2000	Kvitfjell, Norway	Downhill
2000	4 Mar 2000	Kvitfjell, Norway	Downhill
2003	29 Dec 2002	Bormio, Italy	Downhill
2003	25 Jan 2003	Kitzbühel, Austria	Downhill
2004	5 Dec 2003	(United States) Vail, USA	Downhill
2004	23 Jan 2004	Kitzbühel, Austria	Super-G
2004	7 Mar 2004	Kvitfjell, Norway	Super-G
2004	10 Mar 2004	Sestriere, Italy	Downhill
2005	11 Mar 2005	Lenzerheide, Switzerland	Super-G
2006	2 Dec 2005	(United States) Beaver Creek, USA	Downhill
2006	29 Dec 2005	Bormio, Italy	Downhill
2006	14 Jan 2006	Wengen, Switzerland	Downhill

== World Championship results ==
Year	Age	Slalom	Giant slalom	Super G	Downhill	Combined
1996	22	—	DNF1	22	—	—
1997	23	—	DNF1	DNF	31	—
1999	25	—	—	13	DNF	—
2001	27	—	19	1	5	—
2003	29	—	16	22	DSQ	—
2005	31	—	3	10	2	—

== Olympic results ==
Year	Age	Slalom	Giant slalom	Super G	Downhill	Combined
1998	24	—	20	7	—	—
2002	28	—	—	8	16	—
2006	32	—	DNF1	9	10	—
2010	36	24th in ski cross (freestyle)				
