= Norbert Holzknecht =

Austrian alpine skier

Personal information
- Born: 13 April 1976 (age 50) Grinzens, Italy

Skiing career
- Sport: Alpine skiing
- Retired: 2003
- Disciplines: Speed events
- World Cup debut: 1996

World Cup
- Seasons: 8
Medal record
Men's alpine skiing
Representing Austria
Junior World Championships
Silver medal – second place	1995 Voss	Downhill

Norbert Holzknecht (born 13 April 1976) is an Austrian former alpine skier.

== Career ==
During his career he has achieved 3 results among the top 10 in the World Cup.

== Europa Cup results ==
Holzknecht has won an overall Europa Cup and three discipline cup.

- FIS Alpine Ski Europa Cup
  - Overall: 2003
  - Downhill: 1996, 1998, 2003
