= Finlay Mickel =

Scottish alpine skier (born 1977)

Personal information
- Born: 6 December 1977 (age 48) Edinburgh, Scotland
- Height: 1.89 m (6 ft 2 in)

Skiing career
- Sport: Alpine skiing
- Disciplines: Super G, Downhill
- World Cup debut: November 2000

Olympics
- Teams: 1 (2006)
- Medals: 0 (0 gold)

World Championships
- Teams: 4
- Medals: 0 (0 gold)

World Cup
- Seasons: 7
- Wins: 0
- Podiums: 0
- Overall titles: 0
- Discipline titles: 0

Finlay Mickel (born 6 December 1977) is a Scottish skiing coach and former downhill skier who competed in World Cup competitions 2000–2009 and the 2006 Winter Olympics.

== Downhill skier ==
Mickel was born on 6 December 1977 in Edinburgh, Scotland. He was educated at Stewart's Melville College. He first appeared in the World Cup in Lake Louise, Canada in November 2000. His best result in the World Cup was 10th in the Wengen downhill event in Switzerland, in January 2006.

On 5 February 2005, he finished eleventh in the Men's Downhill event at the World Championships held in Bormio, Italy. This was the best result by a British man in the history of the World Championships, and the best in any major competition since Martin Bell finished eighth in the downhill at the 1988 Winter Olympics in Calgary.

In the Olympic Games in Turin in 2006 he finished 25th in the downhill event and 22nd in the super G event.

== Injuries and retirement ==
Mickel sustained several injuries during his career including a fractured left ankle, a ruptured right Achilles tendon, a right ankle fracture, and a fracture to his right tibia plateau. Although he recovered from each of these setbacks, after being a member of the British Alpine ski team for 12 years, he announced his retirement from the sport in May 2009 at the age of 31.

He took up a coaching position with the Scottish Alpine Team.
