= Fritz Strobl =

Austrian alpine skier (born 1972)

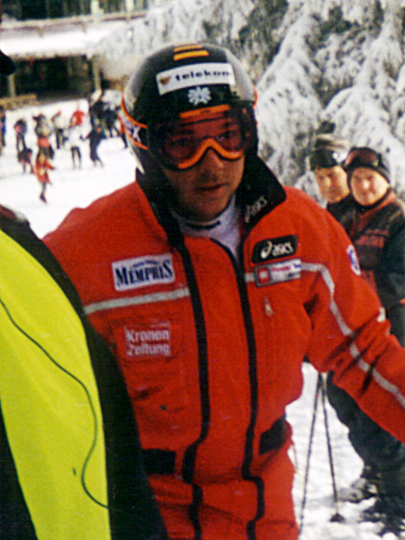
- At Kitzbühel in 2000

Personal information
- Born: 24 August 1972 (age 53) Lienz, East Tyrol, Austria

Skiing career
- Country: Austria
- Sport: Alpine skiing
- Retired: March 2007 (age 34)
- Disciplines: Downhill, super-G, combined
- World Cup debut: 12 December 1992 (age 20)

Olympics
- Teams: 3 – (1998, 2002, 2006)
- Medals: 1 (1 gold)

World Championships
- Teams: 5 – (1997, 2001–2007)
- Medals: 2 (1 gold)

World Cup
- Wins: 9 – (7 DH, 2 SG)
- Podiums: 31 – (25 DH, 6 SG)
- Overall titles: 0 – (5th in 2002)
- Discipline titles: 0 – (2nd in DH; 2002, 2006)
Medal record
Men's alpine skiing
Representing Austria
Olympic Games
Gold medal – first place	2002 Salt Lake City	Downhill
World Championships
Gold medal – first place	2007 Åre	Team event
Silver medal – second place	2007 Åre	Super-G
|}

Fritz Strobl (born 24 August 1972 in Lienz, Austria) is a former World Cup alpine ski racer.

Strobl was the gold medalist in the downhill at the 2002 Winter Olympics in Salt Lake City, run on the Grizzly course at Snowbasin.

In his final season in 2007, he was the silver medalist in the super-G at the World Championships in Åre, Sweden.

Strobl competed on the World Cup circuit for 15 seasons and recorded 9 victories: seven in downhill and two in super-G. He had 31 podium finishes (top 3) and 110 top ten finishes.

He finished second in the downhill standings in 2002 and 2006, and third in 1997 and 2001. His best finish in the overall standings was fifth in 2005.

Strobl is of a handful of racers to have twice won the Hahnenkamm downhill at Kitzbühel (1997 and 2000). He still holds the record time for finishing the full Streif course in 1:51.58, an average speed of 66.4 mph (106.9 km/h), set in 1997. Strobl retired from international competition at age 34, at the conclusion of the 2007 season.

In his final race on 15 March 2007, Strobl descended the Lenzerheide super-G course dressed as Mozart.

== World Cup results ==
=== Season standings ===
Season	Age	Overall	Slalom	Giant slalom	Super-G	Downhill	Combined
1994	21	116	—	—	—	48	—
1995	22						
1996	23						
1997	24	12	—	—	31	3	11
1998	25	28	—	—	—	13	7
1999	26	14	—	—	8	10	13
2000	27	7	—	—	3	6	5
2001	28	13	—	—	19	3	—
2002	29	5	—	—	3	2	—
2003	30	19	—	—	16	7	—
2004	31	14	—	—	18	4	—
2005	32	8	—	—	10	6	—
2006	33	12	—	—	19	2	—
2007	34	28	—	—	15	15	—

=== Race victories ===
- 9 wins – (7 DH, 2 SG)
- 31 podiums – (25 DH, 6 SG), 110 top tens

Season	Date	Location	Discipline
1997	15 Dec 1996	Val-d'Isère, France	Downhill
1997	25 Jan 1997	Kitzbühel, Austria ^	Downhill
1997	12 Mar 1997	(United States) Vail, CO, USA	Downhill
2000	22 Jan 2000	Kitzbühel, Austria	Downhill
2000	13 Feb 2000	St. Anton, Austria	Super-G
2001	27 Jan 2001	Garmisch, Germany	Downhill
2002	29 Dec 2001	Bormio, Italy	Downhill
2002	26 Jan 2002	Garmisch, Germany	Super-G
2006	26 Nov 2005	Lake Louise, Canada	Downhill

^ course record

== World Championship results ==
Year	Age	Slalom	Giant Slalom	Super G	Downhill	Combined
1997	24	—	—	—	4	—
1999	26					
2001	28	—	—	—	6	—
2003	30	—	—	—	10	—
2005	32	—	—	—	4	—
2007	34	—	—	2	22	—

== Olympic results ==
Year	Age	Slalom	Giant Slalom	Super G	Downhill	Combined
1998	25	—	—	—	11	—
2002	29	—	—	4	1	—
2006	33	—	—	—	8	—

== Discography ==
- Genie auf die Ski (2007) No. 2 Austria
