= Michael Walchhofer =

Austrian alpine skier

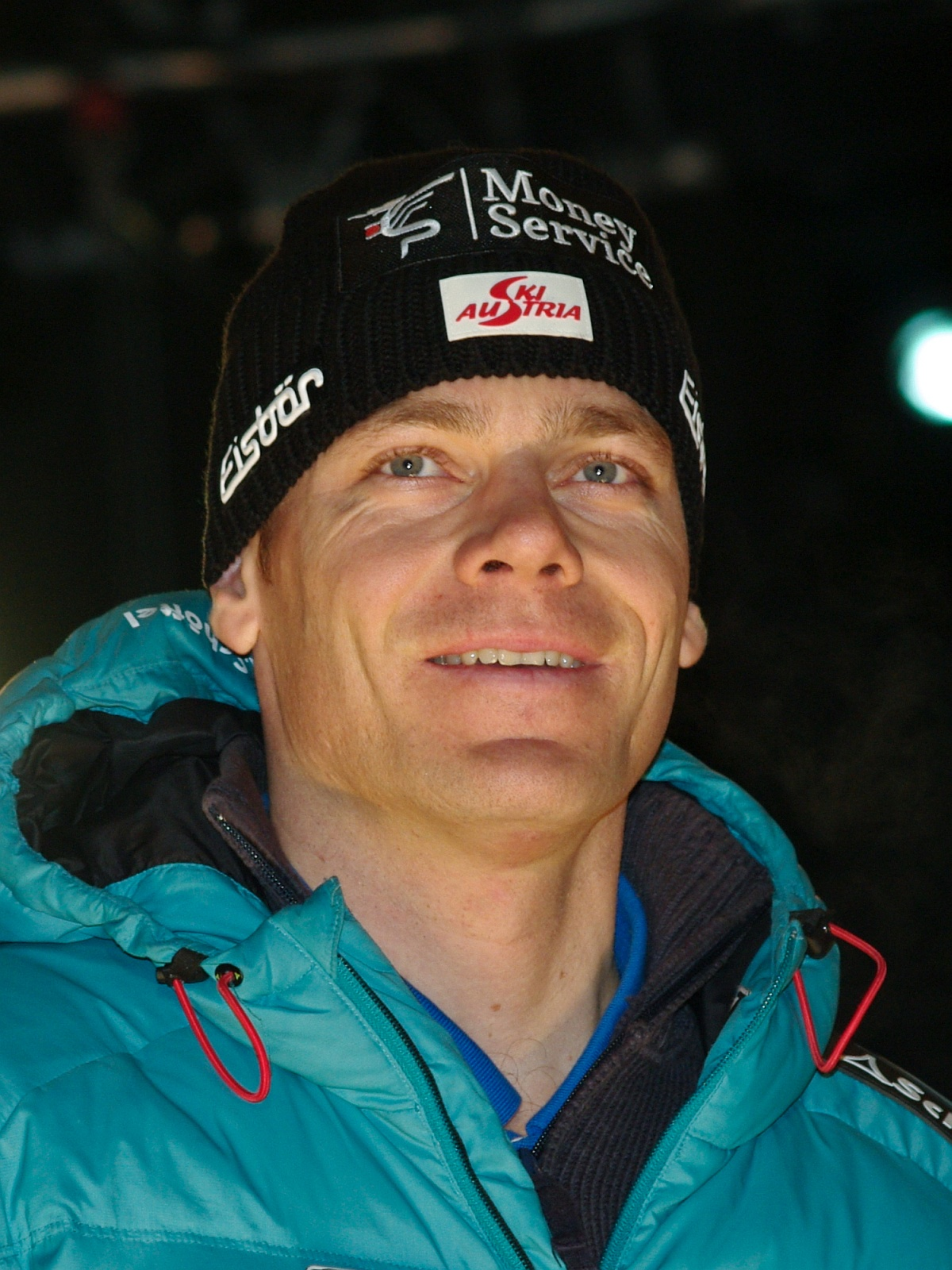
- February 2011

Personal information
- Born: 28 April 1975 (age 51) Radstadt, Salzburg, Austria
- Height: 1.92 m (6 ft 4 in)
- Website: michaelwalchhofer.at

Skiing career
- Sport: Alpine skiing
- Retired: March 2011 (age 35)
- Disciplines: Downhill, super-G, combined, giant slalom, slalom
- World Cup debut: 6 January 1999 (age 23)

Olympics
- Teams: 3 – (2002, 2006, 2010)
- Medals: 1 (0 gold)

World Championships
- Teams: 6 – (1999, 2003–2011)
- Medals: 3 (1 gold)

World Cup
- Seasons: 12 – (2000–2011)
- Wins: 19 – (14 DH, 3 SG, 2 SC/K)
- Podiums: 49 – (36 DH, 9 SG, 4 SC/K)
- Overall titles: 0 – (4th in 2005)
- Discipline titles: 3 – (DH: 2005, 2006, 2009)
Medal record
Men's Alpine skiing
Representing Austria
World Cup Podiums
Event	1st	2nd	3rd
Downhill	14	12	10
Super G	3	2	4
Combination	1	1	1
Super combination	1	0	0
Total	19	15	15
Olympic Games
Silver medal – second place	2006 Torino	Downhill
World Championships
Gold medal – first place	2003 St.Moritz	Downhill
Silver medal – second place	2005 Bormio	Super-G
Silver medal – second place	2005 Bormio	Team Event
Bronze medal – third place	2005 Bormio	Downhill

Michael Walchhofer (born 28 April 1975) is a former World Cup alpine ski racer from Austria.

== Biography ==
Walchhofer was born in Radstadt, Salzburg, Austria, and started his career in slalom, but then moved over to the speed events. During his career, he won the World Cup season title in downhill three times, an Olympic silver medal, and one gold, two silvers, and a bronze medal at World Championships. Walchofer became the first to win the Bormio downhill three times in December 2010. His last World Cup race was the downhill at the finals in Lenzerheide in March 2011.

Walchhofer has been a longtime owner a chain of slopeside luxury hotels and also runs a ski school.

== World Cup results ==
=== Season titles ===
Season	Discipline
2005	Downhill
2006	Downhill
2009	Downhill

=== Season standings ===
Season	Age	Overall	Slalom	Giant slalom	Super-G	Downhill	Combined
1999	23	81	31	—	—	—	—
2000	24	58	23	—	—	—	—
2001	25	43	24	—	—	42	2
2002	26	23	—	—	—	9	5
2003	27	9	40	38	41	3	2
2004	28	7	—	—	5	5	5
2005	29	4	57	25	5	1	—
2006	30	5	—	37	18	1	2
2007	31	16	—	33	21	5	26
2008	32	14	—	60	18	3	—
2009	33	8	—	—	6	1	32
2010	34	10	—	—	2	6	33
2011	35	5	—	—	4	2	—

=== Race victories ===
- 19 wins – (14 DH, 3 SG, 2 SC/K)
- 49 podiums – (36 DH, 9 SG, 4 SC/K)

Season	Date	Location	Race
2003	26 Jan 2003	Kitzbühel, Austria	Combined
2004	29 Nov 2003	Lake Louise, Canada	Downhill
2005	17 Dec 2004	Val Gardena, Italy	Super G
2005	15 Jan 2005	Wengen, Switzerland	Downhill
2005	18 Feb 2005	Garmisch, Germany	Downhill
2005	19 Feb 2005	Garmisch, Germany	Downhill
2006	10 Dec 2005	Val d'Isère, France	Downhill
2006	11 Dec 2005	Val d'Isère, France	Super combined
2006	21 Jan 2006	Kitzbühel, Austria	Downhill
2007	28 Dec 2006	Bormio, Italy	Downhill
2007	29 Dec 2006	Bormio, Italy	Downhill
2008	30 Nov 2007	Beaver Creek, USA	Downhill
2008	15 Dec 2007	Val Gardena, Italy	Downhill
2009	20 Dec 2008	Val Gardena, Italy	Downhill
2010	12 Dec 2009	Val d'Isère, France	Super G
2011	27 Nov 2010	Lake Louise, Canada	Downhill
2011	17 Dec 2010	Val Gardena, Italy	Super G
2011	29 Dec 2010	Bormio, Italy	Downhill
2011	12 Mar 2011	Kvitfjell, Norway	Downhill

== World Championship results ==
Year	Age	Slalom	Giant slalom	Super-G	Downhill	Combined
1999	23	DNF1	—	—	—	6
2001	25					
2003	27	—	—	—	1	—
2005	29	—	—	2	3	4
2007	31	—	—	DNF	15	—
2009	33	—	—	13	12	—
2011	35	—	—	11	7	—

== Olympic results ==
Year	Age	Slalom	Giant slalom	Super-G	Downhill	Combined
2002	26	—	—	—	—	DNF SL1
2006	30	—	—	—	2	DNF SL1
2010	34	—	—	21	10	—

== European Cup ==
=== Season titles ===
Season	Discipline
1999	Overall
1999	Slalom

=== Race victories ===
- 5 wins – (2 DH, 3 SL)
- 8 podiums – (4 DH, 4 SL)

Season	Date	Location	Race
1997	25 Jan 1997	Sestriere, Italy	Downhill
1999	14 Dec 1998	Welschnofen, Italy	Slalom
1999	8 Jan 1999	Kranjska Gora, Slovenia	Slalom
1999	28 Feb 1999	Kiruna, Sweden	Slalom
2000	3 Mar 2000	Tonale Pass, Italy	Downhill
