= 2005 Alpine Skiing World Cup – Men's slalom =

2005 Men's Slalom World Cup
Previous: 2004	Next: 2006

Men's slalom World Cup 2004/2005

== Calendar ==
Round	Race No	Place	Country	Date	Winner	Second	Third
1	7	Beaver Creek	United States	December 5, 2004	(Austria) Benjamin Raich	(Italy) Giorgio Rocca	(Austria) Rainer Schönfelder
2	10	Sestriere	Italy	December 13, 2004	(United States) Bode Miller	(Switzerland) Silvan Zurbriggen	(Finland) Kalle Palander
3	15	Flachau	Austria	December 22, 2004	(Italy) Giorgio Rocca	(Austria) Rainer Schönfelder	(Germany) Alois Vogl
4	18	Chamonix	France	January 9, 2005	(Italy) Giorgio Rocca	(Austria) Benjamin Raich	(Sweden) Markus Larsson
5	22	Wengen	Switzerland	January 16, 2005	(Germany) Alois Vogl	(Croatia) Ivica Kostelić	(Austria) Benjamin Raich
6	23	Kitzbühel	Austria	January 23, 2005	(Austria) Manfred Pranger	(Austria) Mario Matt	(Croatia) Ivica Kostelić
7	25	Schladming	Austria	January 25, 2005	(Austria) Manfred Pranger	(Austria) Benjamin Raich	(Sweden) André Myhrer
8	30	Kranjska Gora	Slovenia	February 27, 2005	(Italy) Giorgio Rocca	(Sweden) André Myhrer	(Austria) Benjamin Raich
9	36	Lenzerheide	Switzerland	March 13, 2005	(Austria) Mario Matt	(Germany) Alois Vogl	(Austria) Rainer Schönfelder

== Final point standings ==
In men's slalom World Cup 2004/05 all results count.

Place	Name	Country	Total points	7 (United States)	10 (Italy)	15 (Austria)	18 (France)	22 (Switzerland)	23 (Austria)	25 (Austria)	30 (Slovenia)	36 (Switzerland)
1	Benjamin Raich	Austria	552	100	50	40	80	60	32	80	60	50
2	Rainer Schönfelder	Austria	408	60	29	80	29	-	50	50	50	60
3	Manfred Pranger	Austria	396	36	36	24	32	50	100	100	18	-
4	Giorgio Rocca	Italy	390	80	-	100	100	-	-	10	100	-
5	Alois Vogl	Germany	310	-	22	60	22	100	26	-	-	80
6	Mario Matt	Austria	294	29	-	45	40	-	80	-	-	100
7	Ivica Kostelić	Croatia	263	-	-	36	45	80	60	-	16	26
8	Manfred Mölgg	Italy	256	24	32	-	26	24	40	36	29	45
9	André Myhrer	Sweden	247	45	18	-	-	12	-	60	80	32
10	Kalle Palander	Finland	227	50	60	-	50	-	16	-	22	29
11	Markus Larsson	Sweden	191	12	-	-	60	45	29	-	45	-
12	Silvan Zurbriggen	Switzerland	170	11	80	-	36	32	-	11	-	-
13	Jean-Pierre Vidal	France	152	-	14	11	-	11	20	45	15	36
14	Akira Sasaki	Japan	144	22	45	26	-	29	-	-	-	22
15	Bode Miller	United States	140	-	100	-	-	-	-	-	-	40
16	Thomas Grandi	Canada	134	-	20	22	-	8	45	32	7	-
17	Michael Janyk	Canada	113	-	15	9	-	-	-	29	40	20
18	Johan Brolenius	Sweden	112	16	26	16	-	14	-	40	-	-
19	Patrick Thaler	Italy	104	-	-	12	12	-	24	-	32	24
20	Giancarlo Bergamelli	Italy	103	7	-	14	-	40	-	-	24	18
21	Kentaro Minagawa	Japan	101	13	24	-	10	-	-	18	36	-
	Pierrick Bourgeat	France	101	-	-	10	15	10	36	22	8	-
23	Kurt Engl	Austria	99	-	16	32	-	36	15	-	-	-
24	Ted Ligety	United States	89	16	-	-	16	-	22	9	26	-
25	Truls Ove Karlsen	Norway	78	-	-	29	14	15	-	20	-	-
26	Tom Rothrock	United States	77	-	40	-	2	22	13	-	-	-
27	Mitja Dragšič	Slovenia	75	5	-	50	-	-	-	-	20	-
28	Patrick Biggs	Canada	66	-	-	-	26	26	-	14	-	-
29	Martin Marinac	Austria	64	-	12	-	8	16	14	-	14	-
	Kilian Albrecht	Austria	64	-	-	-	6	-	18	26	14	-
31	Cristian Deville	Italy	55	20	-	-	9	18	8	-	-	-
32	Jure Košir	Slovenia	53	-	-	13	13	-	11	16	-	-
33	Felix Neureuther	Germany	51	40	-	-	11	-	-	-	-	-
34	Daniel Albrecht	Switzerland	50	18	-	18	-	14	-	-	-	-
35	Andrej Šporn	Slovenia	44	32	-	-	-	-	12	-	-	-
36	Jukka Leino	Finland	38	8	-	-	18	-	-	12	-	-
37	Aksel Lund Svindal	Norway	35	-	-	4	20	-	-	-	11	-
38	Ryan Semple	Canada	30	6	-	15	-	-	9	-	-	-
39	Hannes Paul Schmid	Italy	27	-	-	-	-	20	-	-	7	-
40	Stéphane Tissot	France	26	26	-	-	-	-	-	-	-	-
	Reinfried Herbst	Austria	26	11	-	-	-	-	-	15	-	-
42	Jean-Philippe Roy	Canada	24	-	-	-	-	-	-	24	-	-
43	Martin Hansson	Sweden	23	-	-	-	-	9	-	-	14	-
44	Drago Grubelnik	Slovenia	21	-	12	-	-	-	-	-	9	-
45	Lucas Senoner	Italy	20	-	-	20	-	-	-	-	-	-
46	Jukka Rajala	Finland	18	-	-	-	8	-	10	-	-	-
	Chip Knight	United States	18	-	-	-	5	-	-	13	-	-
48	Mitja Valenčič	Slovenia	17	-	-	-	-	-	7	-	10	-
49	Mitja Kunc	Slovenia	14	14	-	-	-	-	-	-	-	-
50	Hans Petter Buraas	Norway	13	-	13	-	-	-	-	-	-	-
51	Naoki Yuasa	Japan	10	-	10	-	-	-	-	-	-	-
	Erik Schlopy	United States	10	-	-	-	3	7	-	-	-	-
53	Sébastien Amiez	France	9	9	-	-	-	-	-	-	-	-
	Lasse Kjus	Norway	9	-	9	-	-	-	-	-	-	-
55	Tom Stiansen	Norway	8	-	-	8	-	-	-	-	-	-
56	Rishu Okada	Japan	7	-	-	7	-	-	-	-	-	-
57	Michael Walchhofer	Austria	6	-	-	6	-	-	-	-	-	-
58	Kjetil Jansrud	Norway	5	-	-	5	-	-	-	-	-	-
59	Andreas Nilsen	Norway	4	4	-	-	-	-	-	-	-	-
	Alain Baxter	United Kingdom	4	-	-	-	4	-	-	-	-	-

Note:

In the last race only the best racers were allowed to compete and only the best 15 finishers were awarded with points.

== Men's slalom team results ==
bold = highest score italics = race wins

Place	Country	Total points	7 (United States)	10 (Italy)	15 (Austria)	18 (France)	22 (Switzerland)	23 (Austria)	25 (Austria)	30 (Slovenia)	36 (Switzerland)	Racers	Wins
1	Austria	1909	236	143	227	195	162	**309**	271	156	210	9	4
2	Italy	955	131	32	146	147	102	72	46	192	87	7	3
3	Sweden	573	73	44	16	60	80	29	100	139	32	4	0
4	Canada	367	6	35	46	26	34	54	99	47	20	5	0
5	Germany	361	40	22	60	33	100	26	-	-	80	2	1
6	United States	334	16	140	-	26	29	35	22	26	40	5	1
7	France	288	35	14	21	15	21	56	67	23	36	4	0
8	Finland	283	58	60	-	76	-	26	12	22	29	3	0
9	Croatia	263	-	-	36	45	80	60	-	16	26	1	0
10	Japan	262	35	79	33	10	29	-	18	36	22	4	0
11	Slovenia	224	51	12	63	13	-	30	16	36	-	6	0
12	Switzerland	220	29	80	18	36	46	-	11	-	-	2	0
13	Norway	152	4	22	46	34	15	-	20	11	-	7	0
14	United Kingdom	4	-	-	-	4	-	-	-	-	-	1	0
