= 2006 Alpine Skiing World Cup – Men's slalom =

2006 Men's slalom World Cup
Previous: 2005	Next: 2007

Men's slalom World Cup 2005/2006

== Calendar ==
Round	Race No	Place	Country	Date	Winner	Second	Third
1	7	Beaver Creek	United States	December 4, 2005	(Italy) Giorgio Rocca	(France) Stéphane Tissot	(United States) Ted Ligety
2	10	Madonna di Campiglio	Italy	December 12, 2005	(Italy) Giorgio Rocca	(Austria) Benjamin Raich	(Finland) Kalle Palander
3	15	Kranjska Gora	Slovenia	December 22, 2005	(Italy) Giorgio Rocca	(Canada) Thomas Grandi	(United States) Ted Ligety
4	18	Adelboden	Switzerland	January 8, 2006	(Italy) Giorgio Rocca	(United States) Ted Ligety	(Austria) Benjamin Raich
5	21	Wengen	Switzerland	January 15, 2006	(Italy) Giorgio Rocca	(Finland) Kalle Palander	(Germany) Alois Vogl
6	24	Kitzbühel	Austria	January 22, 2006	(France) Jean-Pierre Vidal	(Austria) Reinfried Herbst	(Austria) Benjamin Raich
7	26	Schladming	Austria	January 24, 2006	(Finland) Kalle Palander	(Japan) Akira Sasaki	(Austria) Benjamin Raich
8	33	Shiga Kogen	Japan	March 10, 2006	(Austria) Benjamin Raich	(Japan) Akira Sasaki	(Canada) Thomas Grandi
9	34	Shiga Kogen	Japan	March 11, 2006	(Finland) Kalle Palander (Austria) Reinfried Herbst		(Canada) Thomas Grandi
10	38	Åre	Sweden	March 18, 2006	(Sweden) Markus Larsson	(France) Stéphane Tissot	(Canada) Thomas Grandi

== Final point standings ==
In men's slalom World Cup 2005/06 all results count.

Place	Name	Country	Total points	7 (United States)	10 (Italy)	15 (Slovenia)	18 (Switzerland)	21 (Switzerland)	24 (Austria)	26 (Austria)	33 (Japan)	34 (Japan)	38 (Sweden)
1	Giorgio Rocca	Italy	547	100	100	100	100	100	-	-	15	32	-
2	Kalle Palander	Finland	495	-	60	45	45	80	36	100	29	100	-
3	Benjamin Raich	Austria	410	-	80	-	60	-	60	60	100	50	-
4	Ted Ligety	United States	396	60	40	60	80	45	40	-	45	26	-
5	Thomas Grandi	Canada	360	-	50	80	-	-	32	18	60	60	60
6	Stéphane Tissot	France	336	80	-	8	-	22	50	45	36	15	80
7	Akira Sasaki	Japan	333	50	18	18	-	-	18	80	80	40	29
8	Reinfried Herbst	Austria	316	22	32	6	24	40	80	-	12	100	-
9	Markus Larsson	Sweden	291	-	26	14	40	24	29	-	13	45	100
10	Jean-Pierre Vidal	France	253	-	45	29	50	29	100	-	-	-	-
11	Kentaro Minagawa	Japan	219	20	9	-	-	50	22	40	18	36	24
12	André Myhrer	Sweden	206	-	16	24	36	36	-	50	-	18	26
13	Aksel Lund Svindal	Norway	205	29	24	13	-	26	5	-	40	32	36
14	Rainer Schönfelder	Austria	198	-	15	50	-	-	45	24	26	6	32
15	Ivica Kostelić	Croatia	166	36	36	3	-	-	14	-	16	11	50
16	Mario Matt	Austria	140	50	-	4	-	-	-	13	11	22	40
17	Felix Neureuther	Germany	131	24	-	11	12	-	6	-	32	24	22
18	Michael Janyk	Canada	130	-	22	5	26	7	-	20	50	-	-
19	Pierrick Bourgeat	France	126	12	7	12	18	-	-	16	-	16	45
20	Patrick Thaler	Italy	125	16	29	-	16	-	-	36	20	8	-
21	Kjetil Jansrud	Norway	113	50	-	20	32	11	-	-	-	-	-
22	Alois Vogl	Germany	111	-	-	-	29	60	15	-	7	-	-
23	Manfred Pranger	Austria	101	-	-	32	-	15	-	29	5	20	-
24	Martin Hansson	Sweden	97	14	14	29	-	-	-	32	8	-	-
	Johan Brolenius	Sweden	97	-	10	40	-	-	18	5	-	4	20
26	Daniel Albrecht	Switzerland	77	-	-	-	22	20	12	14	-	9	-
27	Cristian Deville	Italy	72	-	12	-	8	18	8	10	6	10	-
28	Manfred Mölgg	Italy	59	-	8	15	-	-	24	7	-	5	-
	Andreas Omminger	Austria	59	-	-	-	20	16	-	15	-	8	-
30	Bernard Vajdič	Slovenia	51	13	-	10	11	9	8	-	-	-	-
31	Hans Petter Buraas	Norway	50	8	20	-	-	-	-	22	-	-	-
32	Naoki Yuasa	Japan	49	-	-	36	-	-	-	-	13	-	-
33	Bode Miller	United States	45	-	-	-	-	32	13	-	-	-	-
34	Lars Elton Myhre	Norway	42	32	-	-	-	-	4	6	-	-	-
35	Marc Gini	Switzerland	41	9	-	-	-	8	10	-	14	-	-
36	Silvan Zurbriggen	Switzerland	39	26	13	-	-	-	-	-	-	-	-
37	Chip Knight	United States	37	-	-	-	14	-	11	12	-	-	-
	Martin Marinac	Austria	37	-	-	-	-	14	20	-	-	3	-
39	Patrick Biggs	Canada	33	18	11	-	-	-	-	-	4	-	-
40	Mitja Valenčič	Slovenia	32	-	-	-	10	-	-	-	22	-	-
41	Aleš Gorza	Slovenia	30	11	-	7	-	12	-	-	-	-	-
	Jean-Baptiste Grange	France	30	-	-	-	-	-	26	4	-	-	-
43	Marc Berthod	Switzerland	26	-	-	-	15	-	-	11	-	-	-
	Hannes Paul Schmid	Italy	26	-	-	-	-	-	-	26	-	-	-
45	Kilian Albrecht	Austria	25	-	-	-	13	-	-	-	-	12	-
	Alexandre Anselmet	France	25	-	-	-	-	-	-	-	10	15	-
47	Kurt Engl	Austria	24	-	-	-	-	-	-	-	24	-	-
48	Drago Grubelnik	Slovenia	22	-	-	22	-	-	-	-	-	-	-
49	Tom Rothrock	United States	20	15	-	-	5	-	-	-	-	-	-
50	James Cochran	United States	19	-	-	16	-	-	-	3	-	-	-
51	Giancarlo Bergamelli	Italy	18	10	5	-	-	-	3	-	-	-	-
	Peter Fill	Italy	18	-	-	-	-	-	-	-	-	-	18
53	Jure Košir	Slovenia	16	-	7	-	-	-	9	-	-	-	-
	Didier Défago	Switzerland	16	-	-	-	-	-	-	-	-	-	16
55	Jean-Philippe Roy	Canada	15	-	-	-	6	-	-	-	9	-	-
56	Andrej Šporn	Slovenia	13	-	-	-	-	13	-	-	-	-	-
57	Jukka Leino	Finland	10	-	-	-	-	10	-	-	-	-	-
58	Filip Trejbal	Czech Republic	9	-	-	9	-	-	-	-	-	-	-
	Andreas Nilsen	Norway	9	-	-	-	9	-	-	-	-	-	-
	Edoardo Zardini	Italy	9	-	-	-	-	-	-	9	-	-	-
	Alexander Koll	Austria	9	-	-	-	-	-	-	9	-	-	-
62	Erik Schlopy	United States	7	-	-	-	7	-	-	-	-	-	-
63	Steve Missillier	France	3	-	-	-	-	-	-	-	3	-	-

Note:

In the last race only the best racers were allowed to compete and only the best 15 finishers were awarded with points.

== Men's slalom team results ==
bold = highest score italics = race wins

Place	Country	Total points	7 (United States)	10 (Italy)	15 (Slovenia)	18 (Switzerland)	21 (Switzerland)	24 (Austria)	26 (Austria)	33 (Japan)	34 (Japan)	38 (Sweden)	Racers	Wins
1	Austria	1319	72	127	92	117	85	205	150	178	**221**	72	10	2
2	Italy	874	126	154	115	124	118	35	88	41	55	18	8	5
3	France	773	92	52	49	68	51	176	65	49	46	125	6	1
4	Sweden	691	14	66	107	76	60	47	87	21	67	146	4	1
5	Japan	601	70	27	54	-	50	40	120	111	76	53	3	0
6	Canada	538	18	83	85	32	7	32	38	123	60	60	4	0
7	United States	524	75	40	76	106	77	64	15	45	26	-	6	0
8	Finland	505	-	60	45	45	90	36	100	29	100	-	2	2
9	Norway	419	119	44	33	41	37	9	28	40	32	36	5	0
10	Germany	242	24	-	11	41	60	21	-	39	24	22	3	0
11	Switzerland	199	35	13	-	37	28	22	25	14	9	16	5	0
12	Croatia	166	36	36	3	-	-	14	-	16	11	50	1	0
13	Slovenia	164	24	7	39	21	34	17	-	22	-	-	6	0
14	Czech Republic	9	-	-	9	-	-	-	-	-	-	-	1	0

**Alpine Skiing World Cup**
**Men**

Overall | Downhill | Super G | Giant slalom | **Slalom** | Combined

**2005**
