= 2006 Alpine Skiing World Cup – Men's giant slalom =

2006 Men's giant slalom World Cup
| Previous: 2005 | Next: 2007 |

Men's giant slalom World Cup 2005/2006

== Calendar ==
| Round | Race No | Place | Country | Date | Winner | Second | Third |
|---|---|---|---|---|---|---|---|
| 1 | 1 | Sölden | Austria | October 23, 2005 | (Austria) Hermann Maier | (United States) Bode Miller | (Austria) Rainer Schönfelder |
| 2 | 6 | Beaver Creek | United States | December 3, 2005 | (United States) Bode Miller | (United States) Daron Rahlves | (Finland) Kalle Palander |
| 3 | 13 | Alta Badia | Italy | December 18, 2005 | (Italy) Massimiliano Blardone | (Italy) Davide Simoncelli | (Canada) François Bourque |
| 4 | 14 | Kranjska Gora | Slovenia | December 21, 2005 | (Austria) Benjamin Raich | (Italy) Massimiliano Blardone | (Canada) Thomas Grandi |
| 5 | 17 | Adelboden | Switzerland | January 7, 2006 | (Austria) Benjamin Raich | (Sweden) Fredrik Nyberg | (Austria) Stephan Görgl (Finland) Kalle Palander |
| 6 | 31 | Yongpyong | South Korea | March 4, 2006 | (Italy) Davide Simoncelli | (Italy) Massimiliano Blardone | (Norway) Aksel Lund Svindal |
| 7 | 32 | Yongpyong | South Korea | March 5, 2006 | (United States) Ted Ligety | (Sweden) Fredrik Nyberg (Finland) Kalle Palander |
| 8 | 37 | Åre | Sweden | March 17, 2006 | (Austria) Benjamin Raich | (Italy) Massimiliano Blardone | (Sweden) Fredrik Nyberg |

== Final point standings ==
In men's giant slalom World Cup 2005/06 all results count. Source:

| Place | Name | Country | Total points | 1 (Austria) | 6 (United States) | 13 (Italy) | 14 (Slovenia) | 17 (Switzerland) | 31 (South Korea) | 32 (South Korea) | 37 (Sweden) |
|---|---|---|---|---|---|---|---|---|---|---|---|
| 1 | Benjamin Raich | Austria | 481 | 50 | - | 36 | 100 | 100 | 45 | 50 | 100 |
| 2 | Massimiliano Blardone | Italy | 442 | 40 | 20 | 100 | 80 | 24 | 80 | 18 | 80 |
| 3 | Fredrik Nyberg | Sweden | 414 | 36 | 36 | 22 | 50 | 80 | 50 | 80 | 60 |
| 4 | Davide Simoncelli | Italy | 314 | 6 | 29 | 80 | 22 | 32 | 100 | 45 | - |
| 5 | Kalle Palander | Finland | 306 | 22 | 60 | 45 | 13 | 60 | 26 | 80 | - |
| 6 | Thomas Grandi | Canada | 259 | 29 | 14 | 18 | 60 | 40 | 40 | 36 | 22 |
| 7 | François Bourque | Canada | 236 | 45 | 40 | 66 | 6 | - | - | 29 | 50 |
| 8 | Hermann Maier | Austria | 223 | 100 | 32 | 40 | - | 36 | 8 | 7 | - |
| 9 | Bode Miller | United States | 198 | 80 | 100 | - | - | 18 | - | - | - |
| 10 | Aksel Lund Svindal | Norway | 195 | 24 | 45 | 8 | 12 | 6 | 60 | 40 | - |
| 11 | Daron Rahlves | United States | 190 | - | 80 | 50 | - | - | - | 20 | 40 |
| 12 | Ted Ligety | United States | 188 | 32 | - | - | - | 20 | - | 100 | 36 |
| 13 | Rainer Schönfelder | Austria | 169 | 60 | 26 | 26 | 15 | - | 12 | 10 | 20 |
| 14 | Stephan Görgl | Austria | 165 | 20 | - | 32 | - | 60 | 36 | 1 | 16 |
| 15 | Erik Schlopy | United States | 150 | - | 50 | 12 | 40 | 16 | 32 | - | - |
| 16 | Hannes Reichelt | Austria | 142 | 16 | 18 | 20 | 29 | - | - | 14 | 45 |
| 17 | Joël Chenal | France | 137 | 7 | - | 13 | 14 | 32 | 29 | 18 | 24 |
| 18 | Thomas Fanara | France | 121 | - | - | - | 18 | 45 | 26 | - | 32 |
| 19 | Marco Büchel | Liechtenstein | 111 | - | 9 | - | 32 | 16 | 22 | 32 | - |
| 20 | Raphaël Burtin | France | 100 | - | 8 | 24 | 24 | 4 | 16 | 24 | - |
| 21 | Didier Défago | Switzerland | 92 | 15 | - | 15 | 20 | - | 20 | 4 | 18 |
| 22 | Alberto Schieppati | Italy | 91 | 26 | - | - | 26 | - | - | 13 | 26 |
| 23 | Mario Matt | Austria | 76 | 18 | 24 | 6 | - | 16 | - | 12 | - |
| 24 | Didier Cuche | Switzerland | 70 | 8 | 12 | 29 | - | 10 | 6 | 5 | - |
| 25 | Manfred Mölgg | Italy | 67 | - | - | - | 45 | 22 | - | - | - |
| 26 | Patrick Bechter | Austria | 65 | - | - | 14 | - | 32 | 10 | 9 | - |
| 27 | Arnold Rieder | Italy | 59 | 11 | - | 7 | - | 12 | 18 | 11 | - |
| 28 | Christoph Gruber | Austria | 54 | 14 | - | 4 | 10 | - | - | 26 | - |
| 29 | Giorgio Rocca | Italy | 50 | - | 13 | 5 | 10 | 8 | 14 | - | - |
| 30 | Daniel Albrecht | Switzerland | 46 | 15 | 16 | - | - | - | 15 | - | - |
| 31 | Aleš Gorza | Slovenia | 45 | 5 | 7 | - | - | 5 | 13 | 15 | - |
| 32 | James Cochran | United States | 36 | - | - | - | 36 | - | - | - | - |
| 33 | Peter Fill | Italy | 35 | - | - | - | - | - | - | 3 | 32 |
| 34 | Marc Berthod | Switzerland | 34 | - | 16 | - | - | 10 | - | 8 | - |
| 35 | Dane Spencer | United States | 33 | - | 22 | - | 11 | - | - | - | - |
| 36 | Steve Missillier | France | 22 | - | - | - | - | - | - | 22 | - |
| 37 | Michael Walchhofer | Austria | 21 | 10 | - | - | - | - | 11 | - | - |
| | Jean-Philippe Roy | Canada | 21 | - | - | 10 | - | 11 | - | - | - |
| 39 | Gauthier de Tessières | France | 20 | 13 | - | - | - | - | 7 | - | - |
| 40 | Mikro Deflorian | Italy | 18 | - | 2 | - | 16 | - | - | - | - |
| 41 | Felix Neureuther | Germany | 16 | - | - | - | - | - | 10 | 6 | - |
| 42 | Niklas Rainer | Sweden | 13 | 4 | 6 | 3 | - | - | - | - | - |
| | Frédéric Covili | France | 13 | - | 11 | - | - | - | - | 2 | - |
| | Chip Knight | United States | 13 | - | - | - | - | 13 | - | - | - |
| 45 | Andreas Schifferer | Austria | 12 | 12 | - | - | - | - | - | - | - |
| 46 | Kjetil Jansrud | Norway | 11 | - | - | 11 | - | - | - | - | - |
| 47 | Erik Guay | Canada | 10 | - | 10 | - | - | - | - | - | - |
| 48 | Bjarne Solbakken | Norway | 9 | 9 | - | - | - | - | - | - | - |
| | Julien Cousineau | Canada | 9 | - | - | 9 | - | - | - | - | - |
| 50 | Christian Mayer | Austria | 8 | - | - | - | 8 | - | - | - | - |
| 51 | Florian Eisath | Italy | 7 | - | - | - | 7 | - | - | - | - |
| | Mitja Valenčič | Slovenia | 7 | - | - | - | - | 7 | - | - | - |
| 53 | Markus Larsson | Sweden | 5 | - | 5 | - | - | - | - | - | - |
| | Ryan Semple (skier) | Canada | 5 | - | - | - | 5 | - | - | - | - |
| | Jukka Rajala | Finland | 5 | - | - | - | - | - | 5 | - | - |
| 56 | Bernard Vajdič | Slovenia | 4 | - | 4 | - | - | - | - | - | - |
| 57 | Lasse Kjus | Norway | 3 | - | 3 | - | - | - | - | - | - |

Note:

In the last race only the best racers were allowed to compete and only the best 15 finishers were awarded with points.

== Team results ==
bold = highest score italics = race wins

| Place | Country | Total points | 1 (Austria) | 6 (United States) | 13 (Italy) | 14 (Slovenia) | 17 (Switzerland) | 31 (South Korea) | 32 (South Korea) | 37 (Sweden) | Racers | Wins |
|---|---|---|---|---|---|---|---|---|---|---|---|---|
| 1 | Austria | 1416 | **300** | 100 | 178 | 162 | 244 | 122 | 129 | 181 | 11 | 4 |
| 2 | Italy | 1083 | 83 | 64 | 192 | 206 | 98 | 212 | 90 | 138 | 9 | 2 |
| 3 | United States | 808 | 112 | 252 | 62 | 87 | 67 | 32 | 120 | 76 | 7 | 2 |
| 4 | Canada | 516 | 74 | 54 | 94 | 66 | 51 | 40 | 65 | 72 | 6 | 0 |
| 5 | Sweden | 432 | 40 | 47 | 25 | 50 | 80 | 50 | 80 | 60 | 3 | 0 |
| 6 | France | 413 | 20 | 19 | 37 | 56 | 81 | 78 | 66 | 56 | 6 | 0 |
| 7 | Finland | 311 | 22 | 60 | 45 | 13 | 60 | 31 | 80 | - | 2 | 0 |
| 8 | Switzerland | 242 | 38 | 44 | 44 | 20 | 20 | 41 | 17 | 18 | 4 | 0 |
| 9 | Norway | 218 | 33 | 48 | 19 | 12 | 6 | 60 | 40 | - | 4 | 0 |
| 10 | Liechtenstein | 111 | - | 9 | - | 32 | 16 | 22 | 32 | - | 1 | 0 |
| 11 | Slovenia | 56 | 5 | 11 | - | - | 12 | 13 | 15 | - | 3 | 0 |
| 12 | Germany | 16 | - | - | - | - | - | 10 | 6 | - | 1 | 0 |

**Alpine skiing World Cup**
**Men**

Overall | Downhill | Super-G | Giant slalom | Slalom | Combined

**2006**
