= 2006 Alpine Skiing World Cup – Men's combined =

2006 Men's combined World Cup
Previous: 2005	Next: 2007

Men's combined World Cup 2005/2006

== Calendar ==
Round	Race No	Discipline	Place	Country	Date	Winner	Second	Third
1	9	Super Combi	Val d'Isère	France	December 11, 2005	(Austria) Michael Walchhofer	(Austria) Rainer Schönfelder	(United States) Bode Miller
2	19	Super Combi	Wengen	Switzerland	January 13, 2006	(Austria) Benjamin Raich	(Norway) Kjetil André Aamodt	(Italy) Peter Fill
3	25	Downhill; Slalom	Kitzbühel	Austria	January 21, 2006; January 22, 2006	(Austria) Benjamin Raich	(United States) Bode Miller	(Norway) Aksel Lund Svindal
4	29	Super Combi	Chamonix	France	February 3, 2006	(Austria) Benjamin Raich	(Austria) Rainer Schönfelder	(United States) Bode Miller

Three "Super Combined" and one original combined event were held.

== Final point standings ==
In men's combined World Cup 2005/06 all results count.

Place	Name	Country	Total points	9 (France)	20 (Switzerland)	26 (Austria)	30 (France)
1	Benjamin Raich	Austria	345	45	100	100	100
2	Bode Miller	United States	200	60	-	80	60
	Michael Walchhofer	Austria	200	100	50	-	50
4	Rainer Schönfelder	Austria	182	80	22	-	80
5	Kjetil André Aamodt	Norway	162	50	80	-	32
6	Peter Fill	Italy	142	32	60	50	-
7	Aksel Lund Svindal	Norway	140	36	29	60	15
8	Andrej Šporn	Slovenia	123	22	16	45	40
9	Didier Défago	Switzerland	95	-	45	-	50
	Silvan Zurbriggen	Switzerland	93	40	24	-	29
11	Pierrick Bourgeat	France	68	-	32	-	36
12	Lasse Kjus	Norway	56	-	36	-	20
13	Ted Ligety	United States	52	26	-	-	26
	Steven Nyman	United States	52	-	12	40	-
15	Kjetil Jansrud	Norway	45	-	40	-	5
16	Ivica Kostelić	Croatia	41	29	3	-	9
17	Patrick Staudacher	Italy	38	14	13	-	11
18	Bruno Kernen	Switzerland	36	-	-	36	-
19	Christoph Gruber	Austria	35	24	11	-	-
	Lars Elton Myhre	Norway	35	-	26	-	9
21	Hans Olsson	Sweden	34	20	-	-	14
22	Jean-Baptiste Grange	France	33	13	20	-	-
	Ondřej Bank	Czech Republic	33	11	10	-	12
24	John Kucera	Canada	32	16	-	-	16
	Aleksandr Khoroshilov	Russia	32	-	-	32	-
26	Andrej Jerman	Slovenia	30	-	6	-	24
27	François Bourque	Canada	29	-	-	29	-
28	Ambrosi Hoffmann	Switzerland	27	1	-	26	-
29	Markus Larsson	Sweden	22	-	-	-	22
	Werner Heel	Italy	22	9	-	-	13
31	Adrien Theaux	France	19	12	7	-	-
32	Mario Matt	Austria	18	18	-	-	-
	Marc Berthod	Switzerland	18	-	18	-	-
	Lucas Senoner	Italy	18	3	15	-	-
	Jono Brauer	Australia	18	-	-	-	18
36	Daniel Albrecht	Switzerland	16	15	-	-	1
	Ryan Semple	Canada	16	-	10	-	6
38	Aleš Gorza	Slovenia	14	-	14	-	-
39	Scott Macartney	United States	12	10	2	-	-
40	Manuel Osborne-Paradis	Canada	10	-	-	-	10
41	Pierre Paquin	France	9	-	5	-	4
42	Hermann Maier	Austria	8	-	8	-	-
	Alex Antor	Andorra	8	8	-	-	-
44	Bjarne Solbakken	Norway	7	-	-	-	7
	Natko Zrnčić-Dim	Croatia	7	7	-	-	-
46	Stefan Thanei	Italy	6	6	-	-	-
47	Jean-Pierre Vidal	France	5	5	-	-	-
48	Matthias Lanzinger	Austria	4	4	-	-	-
	Filip Trejbal	Czech Republic	4	-	4	-	-
50	Marc Bottollier-Lasquin	France	3	-	-	-	3
51	Rok Perko	Slovenia	2	-	-	-	2
	Guillermo Fayed	France	2	2	-	-	-
53	Andrej Križaj	Slovenia	1	-	1	-	-

The event at Kitzbühel saw no more finishers.

== Men's combined team results ==
bold indicate highest score - italics indicate race wins

Place	Country	Total points	9 (France)	20 (Switzerland)	26 (Austria)	30 (France)	Racers	Wins
1	Austria	792	**271**	**191**	**100**	**230**	7	4
2	Norway	445	86	211	60	88	6	0
3	United States	316	96	14	120	86	4	0
4	Switzerland	285	56	87	62	80	6	0
5	Italy	226	64	88	50	24	5	0
6	Slovenia	170	22	37	45	66	5	0
7	France	139	32	64	-	43	7	0
8	Canada	87	16	10	29	32	4	0
9	Sweden	56	20	-	-	36	2	0
10	Croatia	48	36	3	-	9	2	0
11	Czech Republic	37	11	14	-	12	2	0
12	Russia	32	-	-	32	-	1	0
13	Australia	18	-	-	-	18	1	0
14	Andorra	8	8	-	-	-	1	0

**Alpine Skiing World Cup**
**Men**

Overall | Downhill | Super G | Giant slalom | Slalom | Combined

**2006**
