= 2005–06 FIS Alpine Ski World Cup =

International sports competition

FIS Alpine Ski World Cup 2005/06
Discipline	Men	Women
Overall	(Austria) Benjamin Raich	(Croatia) Janica Kostelić
Downhill	(Austria) Michael Walchhofer	(Austria) Michaela Dorfmeister
Super-G	(Norway) Aksel Lund Svindal	(Austria) Michaela Dorfmeister
Giant slalom	(Austria) Benjamin Raich	(Sweden) Anja Pärson
Slalom	(Italy) Giorgio Rocca	(Croatia) Janica Kostelić
Super combined	(Austria) Benjamin Raich	(Croatia) Janica Kostelić
- Nations Cup: Austria

Competition
Locations	18	15
Individual	37	36
Mixed	1	1
Cancelled	1	—
Rescheduled	—	1

2006 World Cup Champions

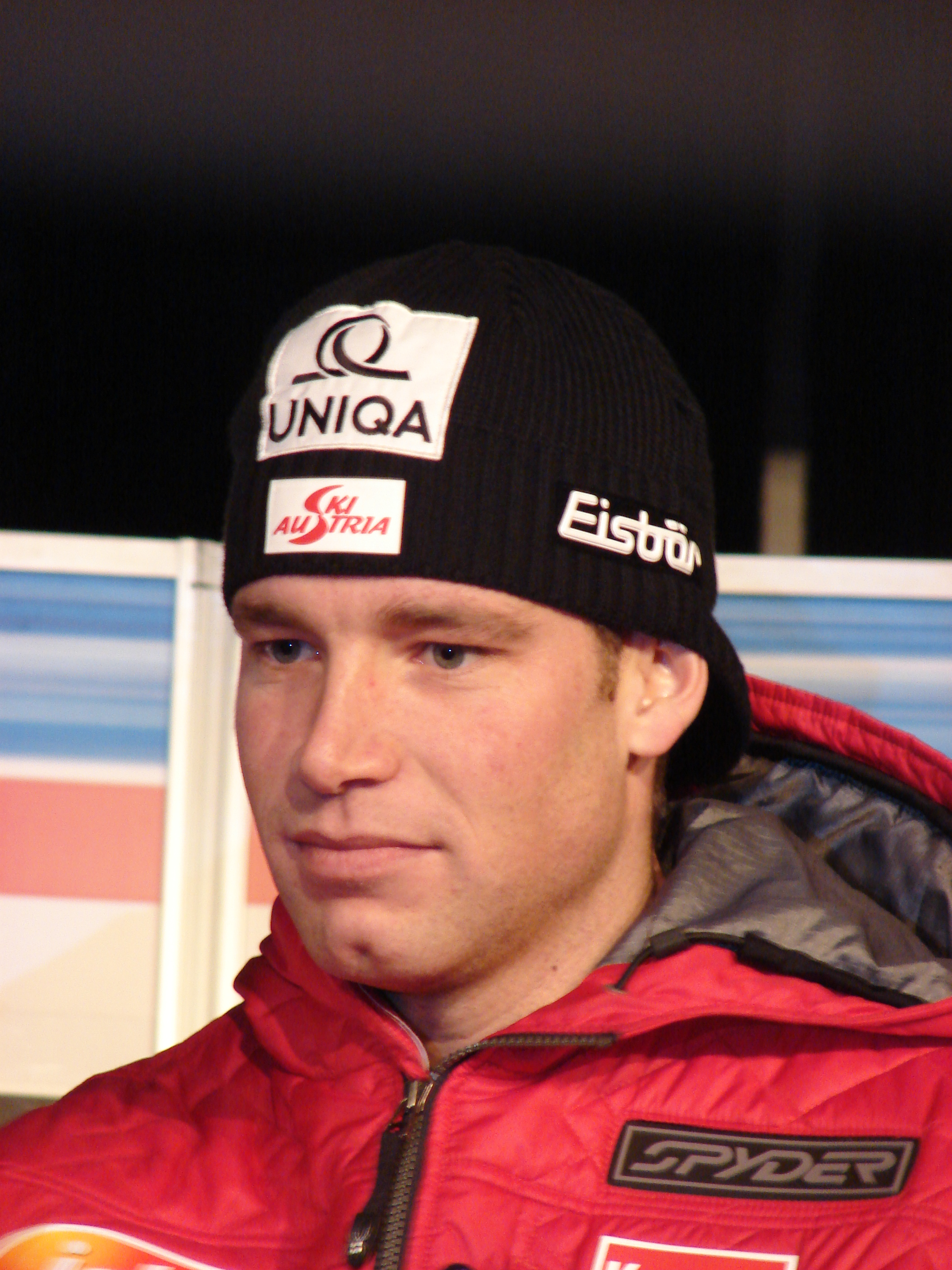
Benjamin Raich won his first overall title.

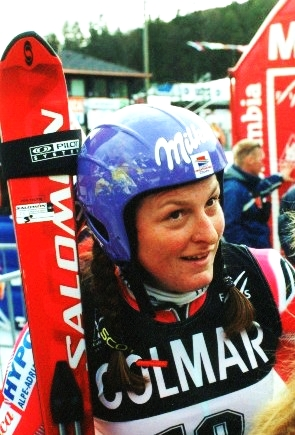
Janica Kostelić won her third overall title.

The 40th World Cup season began in October 2005 and concluded at the World Cup finals in Åre, Sweden, in March 2006. The schedule included a nearly month-long break in February for the 2006 Winter Olympics in Torino, Italy.

Benjamin Raich of Austria won his first overall title after finishing third in 2004 and second in 2005. He added his second consecutive giant slalom discipline globe, and Michael Walchhofer also repeated as downhill champion. Aksel Lund Svindal and Giorgio Rocca were each first-time winners in super-G and slalom respectively. Svindal edged Hermann Maier by only 2 points, denying the "Herminator" a sixth super-G crown.

On the women's side, Janica Kostelić of Croatia won her third overall and slalom World Cup titles. She won 9 races to become only the third skier ever to win races in all 5 disciplines in a single season (joining Marc Girardelli and Petra Kronberger). Kostelić amassed 1970 World Cup points, a new women's record and second only to Hermann Maier's 2000 points in 2000. Although Anja Pärson failed to win her third straight overall crown, she won 8 races while capturing her third giant slalom globe, and her 1662 points would have been enough to win the overall in any of the previous 6 seasons. In her final season on the World Cup tour, Michaela Dorfmeister secured her second downhill and super-G titles.

== Calendar ==
=== Men ===
Event key: DH – Downhill, SL – Slalom, GS – Giant slalom, SG – Super giant slalom, KB – Classic Combined, SC – Super combined
Race	Season	Date	Place	Type	Winner	Second	Third	Details
1225	1	23 October 2005	(Austria) Sölden	GS _{304}	(Austria) Hermann Maier	(United States) Bode Miller	(Austria) Rainer Schönfelder	
1226	2	26 November 2005	(Canada) Lake Louise	DH _{359}	(Austria) Fritz Strobl	(Norway) Kjetil André Aamodt	(Liechtenstein) Marco Büchel	
1227	3	27 November 2005	(Canada) Lake Louise	SG _{124}	(Norway) Aksel Lund Svindal	(Austria) Benjamin Raich	(United States) Daron Rahlves	
1228	4	1 December 2005	(United States) Beaver Creek	SG _{125}	(Austria) Hannes Reichelt	(Canada) Erik Guay	(Austria) Matthias Lanzinger	
1229	5	2 December 2005	(United States) Beaver Creek	DH _{360}	(United States) Daron Rahlves	(United States) Bode Miller	(Austria) Hans Grugger	
1230	6	3 December 2005	(United States) Beaver Creek	GS _{305}	(United States) Bode Miller	(United States) Daron Rahlves	(Finland) Kalle Palander	
1231	7	4 December 2005	(United States) Beaver Creek	SL _{351}	(Italy) Giorgio Rocca	(France) Stéphane Tissot	(United States) Ted Ligety	
1232	8	10 December 2005	(France) Val-d'Isère	DH _{361}	(Austria) Michael Walchhofer	(Austria) Fritz Strobl	(Austria) Hans Grugger	
1233	9	11 December 2005	(France) Val-d'Isère	SC _{088}	(Austria) Michael Walchhofer	(Austria) Rainer Schönfelder	(United States) Bode Miller	
1234	10	12 December 2005	(Italy) Madonna di Campiglio	SL _{352}	(Italy) Giorgio Rocca	(Austria) Benjamin Raich	(Finland) Kalle Palander	
1235	11	16 December 2005	(Italy) Gröden-Val Gardena	SG _{126}	(Austria) Hans Grugger	(Canada) Erik Guay	(Switzerland) Ambrosi Hoffmann	
1236	12	17 December 2005	(Italy) Gröden-Val Gardena	DH _{362}	(Liechtenstein) Marco Büchel	(Austria) Michael Walchhofer	(Canada) Erik Guay	
1237	13	18 December 2005	(Italy) Alta Badia	GS _{306}	(Italy) Massimiliano Blardone	(Italy) Davide Simoncelli	(Canada) François Bourque	
1238	14	21 December 2005	(Slovenia) Kranjska Gora	GS _{307}	(Austria) Benjamin Raich	(Italy) Massimiliano Blardone	(Canada) Thomas Grandi	
1239	15	22 December 2005	(Slovenia) Kranjska Gora	SL _{353}	(Italy) Giorgio Rocca	(Canada) Thomas Grandi	(United States) Ted Ligety	
1240	16	29 December 2005	(Italy) Bormio	DH _{363}	(United States) Daron Rahlves	(Austria) Fritz Strobl	(Switzerland) Tobias Grünenfelder	
1241	17	7 January 2006	(Switzerland) Adelboden	GS _{308}	(Austria) Benjamin Raich	(Sweden) Fredrik Nyberg	(Austria) Stephan Görgl (Finland) Kalle Palander	
1242	18	8 January 2006	(Switzerland) Adelboden	SL _{354}	(Italy) Giorgio Rocca	(United States) Ted Ligety	(Austria) Benjamin Raich	
1243	19	13 January 2006	(Switzerland) Wengen	SC _{089}	(Austria) Benjamin Raich	(Norway) Kjetil André Aamodt	(Italy) Peter Fill	
1244	20	14 January 2006	(Switzerland) Wengen	DH _{364}	(United States) Daron Rahlves	(Austria) Michael Walchhofer	(Austria) Fritz Strobl	
1245	21	15 January 2006	(Switzerland) Wengen	SL _{355}	(Italy) Giorgio Rocca	(Finland) Kalle Palander	(Germany) Alois Vogl	
1246	22	20 January 2006	(Austria) Kitzbühel	SG _{127}	(Austria) Hermann Maier	(Italy) Peter Fill	(Austria) Hannes Reichelt	
1247	23	21 January 2006	(Austria) Kitzbühel	DH _{365}	(Austria) Michael Walchhofer	(Liechtenstein) Marco Büchel	(United States) Daron Rahlves	
1248	24	22 January 2006	(Austria) Kitzbühel	SL _{356}	(France) Jean-Pierre Vidal	(Austria) Reinfried Herbst	(Austria) Benjamin Raich	
1249	25	22 January 2006	(Austria) Kitzbühel	KB _{090}	(Austria) Benjamin Raich	(United States) Bode Miller	(Norway) Aksel Lund Svindal	
1250	26	24 January 2006	(Austria) Schladming	SL _{357}	(Finland) Kalle Palander	(Japan) Akira Sasaki	(Austria) Benjamin Raich	
1251	27	28 January 2006	(Germany) Garmisch-Partenkirchen	DH _{366}	(Austria) Hermann Maier	(Austria) Klaus Kröll	(Austria) Andreas Buder	
1252	28	29 January 2006	(Germany) Garmisch-Partenkirchen	SG _{128}	(Austria) Christoph Gruber	(United States) Scott Macartney	(Norway) Kjetil André Aamodt	
1253	29	3 February 2006	(France) Chamonix	SC _{091}	(Austria) Benjamin Raich	(Austria) Rainer Schönfelder	(United States) Bode Miller	
		4 February 2006	(France) Chamonix	DH _{cnx}	canceled			
2006 Winter Olympics (12–25 February)
1254	30	4 March 2006	(South Korea) Yongpyong	GS _{309}	(Italy) Davide Simoncelli	(Italy) Massimiliano Blardone	(Norway) Aksel Lund Svindal	
1255	31	5 March 2006	(South Korea) Yongpyong	GS _{310}	(United States) Ted Ligety	(Finland) Kalle Palander (Sweden) Fredrik Nyberg		
1256	32	10 March 2006	(Japan) Shiga Kogen	SL _{358}	(Austria) Benjamin Raich	(Japan) Akira Sasaki	(Canada) Thomas Grandi	
1257	33	11 March 2006	(Japan) Shiga Kogen	SL _{359}	(Finland) Kalle Palander (Austria) Reinfried Herbst		(Canada) Thomas Grandi	
1258	34	15 March 2006	(Sweden) Åre	DH _{367}	(Norway) Aksel Lund Svindal	(United States) Bode Miller	(Italy) Peter Fill	
1259	35	16 March 2006	(Sweden) Åre	SG _{129}	(United States) Bode Miller	(United States) Daron Rahlves	(Norway) Aksel Lund Svindal	
1260	36	17 March 2006	(Sweden) Åre	GS _{311}	(Austria) Benjamin Raich	(Italy) Massimiliano Blardone	(Sweden) Fredrik Nyberg	
1261	37	18 March 2006	(Sweden) Åre	SL _{360}	(Sweden) Markus Larsson	(France) Stéphane Tissot	(Canada) Thomas Grandi	

=== Ladies ===
Event key: DH – Downhill, SL – Slalom, GS – Giant slalom, SG – Super giant slalom, SC – Super combined
Race	Season	Date	Place	Type	Winner	Second	Third	Details
1146	1	22 October 2005	(Austria) Sölden	GS _{302}	(Slovenia) Tina Maze	(Croatia) Janica Kostelić	(Sweden) Anja Pärson	
1147	2	2 December 2005	(Canada) Lake Louise	DH _{296}	(Italy) Elena Fanchini	(Austria) Michaela Dorfmeister	(Austria) Alexandra Meissnitzer	
1148	3	3 December 2005	(Canada) Lake Louise	DH _{297}	(United States) Lindsey Kildow	(Switzerland) Sylviane Berthod	(Austria) Michaela Dorfmeister	
1149	4	4 December 2005	(Canada) Lake Louise	SG _{136}	(Austria) Alexandra Meissnitzer	(Austria) Andrea Fischbacher	(Austria) Michaela Dorfmeister	
1150	5	9 December 2005	(United States) Aspen	SG _{137}	(Switzerland) Nadia Styger	(Austria) Michaela Dorfmeister	(Austria) Andrea Fischbacher	
1151	6	10 December 2005	(United States) Aspen	GS _{303}	(Spain) María José Rienda Contreras	(Sweden) Anja Pärson	(Austria) Kathrin Zettel	
1152	7	11 December 2005	(United States) Aspen	SL _{338}	(Sweden) Anja Pärson	(Croatia) Janica Kostelić	(Austria) Kathrin Zettel	
1153	8	17 December 2005	(France) Val-d'Isère	DH _{298}	(United States) Lindsey Kildow	(United States) Caroline Lalive	(Austria) Alexandra Meissnitzer	
1154	9	18 December 2005	(France) Val-d'Isère	SG _{138}	(Austria) Michaela Dorfmeister	(Austria) Alexandra Meissnitzer	(Canada) Emily Brydon	
1155	10	21 December 2005	(Czech Republic) Špindlerův Mlýn	GS _{304}	(Croatia) Janica Kostelić	(Austria) Kathrin Zettel	(Austria) Marlies Schild	
1156	11	22 December 2005	(Czech Republic) Špindlerův Mlýn	SL _{339}	(Sweden) Anja Pärson	(Croatia) Janica Kostelić	(Austria) Marlies Schild	
1157	12	28 December 2005	(Austria) Lienz	GS _{305}	(Sweden) Anja Pärson	(Austria) Nicole Hosp	(Slovenia) Tina Maze	
1158	13	29 December 2005	(Austria) Lienz	SL _{340}	(Austria) Marlies Schild	(Austria) Nicole Hosp	(Croatia) Janica Kostelić	
1159	14	5 January 2006	(Croatia) Zagreb	SL _{341}	(Austria) Marlies Schild	(Austria) Kathrin Zettel	(Croatia) Janica Kostelić	
		7 January 2006	(Slovenia) Maribor	GS _{cnx}	replaced in Ofterschwang on 3 February 2006			
1160	15	8 January 2006	(Slovenia) Maribor	SL _{342}	(Austria) Marlies Schild	(Croatia) Janica Kostelić	(Sweden) Therese Borssén	
1161	16	13 January 2006	(Austria) Bad Kleinkirchheim	DH _{299}	(Sweden) Anja Pärson	(Austria) Michaela Dorfmeister	(Switzerland) Fränzi Aufdenblatten	
1162	17	14 January 2006	(Austria) Bad Kleinkirchheim	DH _{300}	(Croatia) Janica Kostelić	(Sweden) Nike Bent	(Austria) Michaela Dorfmeister	
1163	18	15 January 2006	(Austria) Bad Kleinkirchheim	SG _{139}	(Croatia) Janica Kostelić	(Austria) Michaela Dorfmeister (Austria) Alexandra Meissnitzer		
1164	19	20 January 2006	(Switzerland) St. Moritz	SG _{140}	(Austria) Michaela Dorfmeister	(Slovenia) Tina Maze	(Austria) Nicole Hosp	
1165	20	21 January 2006	(Switzerland) St. Moritz	DH _{301}	(Austria) Michaela Dorfmeister	(Austria) Renate Götschl	(Croatia) Janica Kostelić	
1166	21	22 January 2006	(Switzerland) St. Moritz	SC _{074}	(Croatia) Janica Kostelić	(Sweden) Anja Pärson	(United States) Lindsey Kildow	
1167	22	27 January 2006	(Italy) Cortina d'Ampezzo	SG _{141}	(Sweden) Anja Pärson	(United States) Julia Mancuso	(United States) Lindsey Kildow	
1168	23	28 January 2006	(Italy) Cortina d'Ampezzo	DH _{302}	(Austria) Renate Götschl	(United States) Julia Mancuso	(Austria) Elisabeth Görgl	
1169	24	29 January 2006	(Italy) Cortina d'Ampezzo	GS _{306}	(Austria) Nicole Hosp	(Canada) Geneviève Simard	(Austria) Elisabeth Görgl	
1170	25	(Note: Giant slalom from Maribor was rescheduled to Ofterschwang on 3 February 2006)3 February 2006	(Germany) Ofterschwang	GS _{307}	(Spain) María José Rienda Contreras	(Sweden) Anja Pärson	(Austria) Kathrin Zettel	
1171	26	4 February 2006	(Germany) Ofterschwang	GS _{308}	(Spain) María José Rienda Contreras (Sweden) Anja Pärson		(United States) Julia Mancuso	
1172	27	5 February 2006	(Germany) Ofterschwang	SL _{343}	(Croatia) Janica Kostelić	(Austria) Kathrin Zettel	(Austria) Marlies Schild	
2006 Winter Olympics (12–25 February)
1173	28	3 March 2006	(Norway) Hafjell	SG _{142}	(Austria) Michaela Dorfmeister (United States) Lindsey Kildow (Switzerland) Nadia Styger			
1174	29	4 March 2006	(Norway) Hafjell	SC _{075}	(Croatia) Janica Kostelić	(Sweden) Anja Pärson	(Austria) Marlies Schild	
1175	30	5 March 2006	(Norway) Hafjell	GS _{309}	(Spain) María José Rienda Contreras	(Austria) Nicole Hosp	(Finland) Tanja Poutiainen	
1176	31	10 March 2006	(Finland) Levi	SL _{344}	(Croatia) Janica Kostelić	(Sweden) Anja Pärson	(Austria) Kathrin Zettel	
1177	32	11 March 2006	(Finland) Levi	SL _{345}	(Sweden) Anja Pärson	(Croatia) Janica Kostelić	(Austria) Nicole Hosp	
1178	33	15 March 2006	(Sweden) Åre	DH _{303}	(Sweden) Anja Pärson	(United States) Lindsey Kildow	(Austria) Elisabeth Görgl	
1179	34	16 March 2006	(Sweden) Åre	SG _{143}	(Austria) Nicole Hosp	(Austria) Michaela Dorfmeister	(Germany) Martina Ertl-Renz	
1180	35	17 March 2006	(Sweden) Åre	SL _{346}	(Croatia) Janica Kostelić	(Austria) Marlies Schild	(Sweden) Anja Pärson	
1181	36	18 March 2006	(Sweden) Åre	GS _{310}	(Croatia) Janica Kostelić	(Canada) Geneviève Simard	(Austria) Nicole Hosp (Finland) Tanja Poutiainen	

=== Nations team event ===
Event key: SC – Super combined (super-G + slalom)
Race	Season	Date	Place	Type	Winner	Second	Third	Details
1	1	19 March 2006	(Sweden) Åre	SC _{001}	Austria Andrea Fischbacher; Nicole Hosp; Michaela Kirchgasser; Stephan Görgl; Reinfried Herbst; Benjamin Raich	United States Lindsey Kildow; Julia Mancuso; Resi Stiegler; Ted Ligety; Scott Macartney; Daron Rahlves	Sweden Janette Hargin; Jessica Lindell-Vikarby; Maria Pietilä Holmner; Patrik Järbyn; Markus Larsson; Andre Myhrer	

== Men ==
=== Overall ===
Place	Name	Country	Total
1	Benjamin Raich	Austria	1410
2	Aksel Lund Svindal	Norway	1006
3	Bode Miller	United States	928
4	Daron Rahlves	United States	903
5	Michael Walchhofer	Austria	855

=== Downhill ===
see complete table

In men's downhill World Cup 2005/06 all results count.

Place	Name	Country	Total	2 (Canada)	5 (United States)	8 (France)	12 (Italy)	16 (Italy)	20 (Switzerland)	23 (Austria)	27 (Germany)	30 (France)	35 (Sweden)
1	Michael Walchhofer	Austria	522	36	26	100	80	50	80	100	26	-	24
2	Fritz Strobl	Austria	491	100	50	80	45	80	60	-	26	-	50
3	Daron Rahlves	United States	444	-	100	18	12	100	100	60	18	-	36
4	Marco Büchel	Liechtenstein	400	60	22	24	100	45	29	80	40	-	-
5	Bode Miller	United States	340	9	80	36	32	29	24	50	-	-	80
6	Kjetil André Aamodt	Norway	322	80	32	40	40	-	45	-	45	-	40
7	Hermann Maier	Austria	305	50	12	29	18	20	50	8	100	-	18
8	Bruno Kernen	Switzerland	268	45	45	50	24	-	24	14	40	-	26
9	Didier Défago	Switzerland	246	26	5	8	29	32	32	40	29	-	45
10	Kristian Ghedina	Italy	235	4	13	26	50	40	24	36	22	-	20
11	Erik Guay	Canada	221	14	40	36	60	15	11	45	-	-	-
12	Klaus Kröll	Austria	216	32	-	45	9	26	12	12	80	-	-
13	Aksel Lund Svindal	Norway	182	40	7	12	5	-	18	-	-	-	100

=== Super-G ===
see complete table

In men's Super G World Cup 2005/06 all results count.

Place	Name	Country	Total	3 (Canada)	4 (United States)	11 (Italy)	22 (Austria)	28 (Germany)	36 (Sweden)
1	Aksel Lund Svindal	Norway	284	100	50	45	18	11	60
2	Hermann Maier	Austria	282	10	32	40	100	50	50
3	Daron Rahlves	United States	269	60	45	24	40	20	80
4	Hannes Reichelt	Austria	250	32	100	-	60	29	29
5	Kjetil André Aamodt	Norway	223	45	36	50	-	60	32
6	Erik Guay	Canada	204	24	80	80	20	-	-
7	Ambrosi Hoffmann	Switzerland	165	50	14	60	32	9	-
8	Peter Fill	Italy	162	11	16	9	80	10	36
9	Christoph Gruber	Austria	147	18	-	16	13	100	-
10	Bode Miller	United States	145	13	-	32	-	-	100
11	Stephan Görgl	Austria	144	6	15	12	50	16	45
12	Hans Grugger	Austria	133	15	18	100	-	-	-

=== Giant slalom ===
see complete table

In men's giant slalom World Cup 2005/06 all results count.

Place	Name	Country	Total	1 (Austria)	6 (United States)	13 (Italy)	14 (Slovenia)	17 (Switzerland)	31 (South Korea)	32 (South Korea)	37 (Sweden)
1	Benjamin Raich	Austria	481	50	-	36	100	100	45	50	100
2	Massimiliano Blardone	Italy	442	40	20	100	80	24	80	18	80
3	Fredrik Nyberg	Sweden	414	36	36	22	50	80	50	80	60
4	Davide Simoncelli	Italy	314	6	29	80	22	32	100	45	-
5	Kalle Palander	Finland	306	22	60	45	13	60	26	80	-
6	Thomas Grandi	Canada	259	29	14	18	60	40	40	36	22
7	François Bourque	Canada	236	45	40	66	6	-	-	29	50
8	Hermann Maier	Austria	223	100	32	40	-	36	8	7	-
9	Bode Miller	United States	198	80	100	-	-	18	-	-	-
10	Aksel Lund Svindal	Norway	195	24	45	8	12	6	60	40	-
11	Daron Rahlves	United States	190	-	80	50	-	-	-	20	40
12	Ted Ligety	United States	188	32	-	-	-	20	-	100	36

=== Slalom ===
see complete table

Place	Name	Country	Total	7 (United States)	10 (Italy)	15 (Slovenia)	18 (Switzerland)	21 (Switzerland)	24 (Austria)	26 (Austria)	33 (Japan)	34 (Japan)	38 (Sweden)
1	Giorgio Rocca	Italy	547	100	100	100	100	100	-	-	15	32	-
2	Kalle Palander	Finland	495	-	60	45	45	80	36	100	29	100	-
3	Benjamin Raich	Austria	410	-	80	-	60	-	60	60	100	50	-
4	Ted Ligety	United States	396	60	40	60	80	45	40	-	45	26	-
5	Thomas Grandi	Canada	360	-	50	80	-	-	32	18	60	60	60
6	Stéphane Tissot	France	336	80	-	8	-	22	50	45	36	15	80
7	Akira Sasaki	Japan	333	50	18	18	-	-	18	80	80	40	29
8	Reinfried Herbst	Austria	316	22	32	6	24	40	80	-	12	100	-
9	Markus Larsson	Sweden	291	-	26	14	40	24	29	-	13	45	100
10	Jean-Pierre Vidal	France	253	-	45	29	50	29	100	-	-	-	-

=== Super combined ===
see complete table

Place	Name	Country	Total	9 (France)	20 (Switzerland)	26 (Austria)	30 (France)
1	Benjamin Raich	Austria	345	45	100	100	100
2	Bode Miller	United States	200	60	-	80	60
	Michael Walchhofer	Austria	200	100	50	-	50
4	Rainer Schönfelder	Austria	182	80	22	-	80
5	Kjetil André Aamodt	Norway	162	50	80	-	32
6	Peter Fill	Italy	142	32	60	50	-
7	Aksel Lund Svindal	Norway	140	36	29	60	15
8	Andrej Šporn	Slovenia	123	22	16	45	40
9	Didier Défago	Switzerland	95	-	45	-	50
	Silvan Zurbriggen	Switzerland	93	40	24	-	29

== Women ==
=== Overall ===
Place	Name	Country	Total
1	Janica Kostelić	Croatia	1970
2	Anja Pärson	Sweden	1662
3	Michaela Dorfmeister	Austria	1364
4	Nicole Hosp	Austria	1112
5	Lindsey Kildow	United States	1067

=== Downhill ===
Place	Name	Country	Total
1	Michaela Dorfmeister	Austria	498
2	Lindsey Kildow	United States	410
3	Renate Götschl	Austria	315
4	Janica Kostelić	Croatia	300
5	Fränzi Aufdenblatten	Switzerland	272

=== Super-G ===
Place	Name	Country	Total
1	Michaela Dorfmeister	Austria	626
2	Alexandra Meissnitzer	Austria	437
3	Nadia Styger	Switzerland	360
4	Lindsey Kildow	United States	326
5	Janica Kostelić	Croatia	266

=== Giant slalom ===
Place	Name	Country	Total
1	Anja Pärson	Sweden	585
2	María José Rienda Contreras	Spain	537
3	Janica Kostelić	Croatia	464
4	Nicole Hosp	Austria	461
5	Geneviève Simard	Canada	343

=== Slalom ===
Place	Name	Country	Total
1	Janica Kostelić	Croatia	740
2	Marlies Schild	Austria	550
3	Anja Pärson	Sweden	485
4	Kathrin Zettel	Austria	399
5	Tanja Poutiainen	Finland	320

=== Super combined ===
Place	Name	Country	Total
1	Janica Kostelić	Croatia	200
2	Anja Pärson	Sweden	160
3	Lindsey Kildow	United States	110
4	Marlies Schild	Austria	105
5	Nicole Hosp	Austria	90

== Nations Cup ==
=== Overall ===
Place	Country	Total
1	Austria	15449
2	United States	6541
3	Italy	4892
4	Sweden	4722
5	Switzerland	3951
6	Canada	3260
7	France	2744
8	Croatia	2503
9	Norway	2333
10	Germany	1657

See also: Alpine skiing at the 2006 Winter Olympics
