= Skis Rossignol =

French sports equipment and clothing manufacturer

Skis Rossignol S.A.
- Industry: Snowsports, clothing
- Founded: 1907
- Headquarters: Saint-Jean-de-Moirans, France
- Website: www.rossignol.com

Skis Rossignol S.A., or simply Rossignol, is a French manufacturer of alpine, snowboard, and Nordic equipment, as well as related outerwear and accessories, located in Isère, France. Rossignol was one of the first companies to produce plastic skis. The company also owns the brands Dynastar and LOOK. In 2005, Rossignol was bought by boardsport equipment manufacturer Quiksilver for $560 million. In 2008, Quiksilver made a deal to sell Rossignol for $147 million to a former chief executive, Bruno Cercley.

In July 2013, Macquarie sold the Rossignol Group, along with its subsidiaries Lange and Dynastar, to a partnership of Altor Equity Partners and the Boix-Vives family.

== History ==
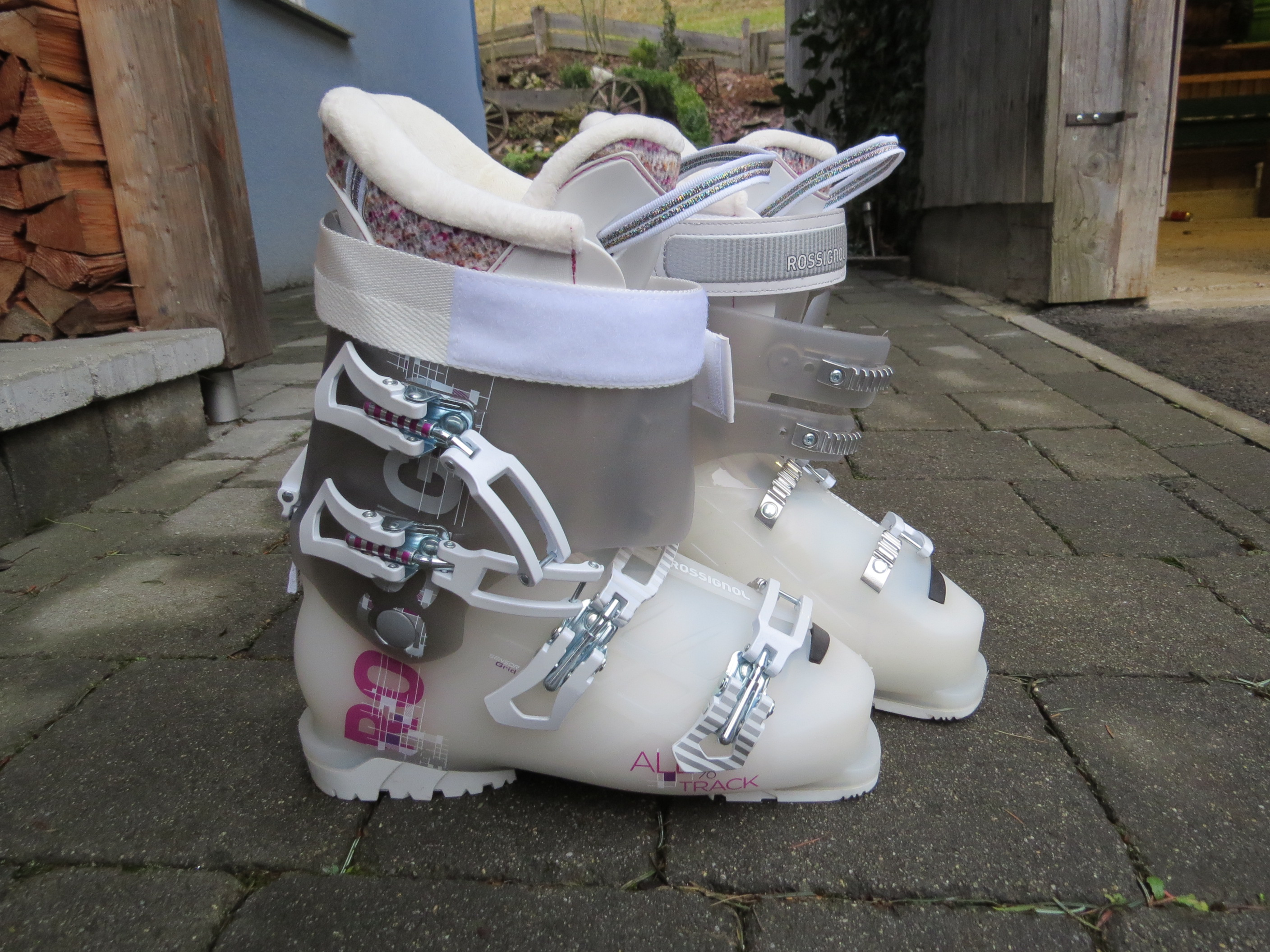
Rossignol ski boots

The company was founded in 1907 by Abel Rossignol, who manufactured wood products (such as spindles) for the textile industry. Rossignol, a committed skier, used his carpentry skills to make a pair of skis out of solid wood. In 1937, Émile Allais of France became triple world champion on Rossignol Olympic 41 skis.

When Laurent Boix-Vives bought the company in 1956, the company only focused on skiing equipment and began to sell them worldwide. Rossignol had a breakthrough during the 1960 Winter Olympics in Squaw Valley, California, United States, when Jean Vuarnet of France won the downhill on Allais 60s, the company's first all-metal skis.

In 1964, Rossignol released the Strato, its first fiberglass ski.

In the 1970s, Rossignol set up a distribution company in the U.S., launching its first Nordic skis, and soon became the world's largest ski manufacturer. At the 1988 Winter Olympics in Calgary, Alberta, Canada, Rossignol triumphed, winning six out of 10 gold medals in alpine events.

In 1990, Rossignol acquired the Caber boot factory in Italy and rebranded the product under the Rossignol label (Rossignol already controlled the Lange ski boot brand). The company also acquired the Geze and Look ski-bindings ranges, rebranding Geze. It soon moved into snowboards and mountain clothing.

Athletes using Rossignol products won at both the Winter Olympic games in Albertville and in Lillehammer.

In 2006, Huntington Beach, CA based Quiksilver acquired Rossignol only to sell the entity back in 2008. The debt incurred ultimately resulted in Quiksilver's bankruptcy.

In 2018, Rossignol acquired the Norwegian clothing brand Dale of Norway.

Alberto Tomba of Italy, the dominant technical skier of the late 1980s and 1990s, raced on Rossignol skis.

Rossignol is the French word for nightingale.

== Team riders and skiers ==
Freestyle

- Mike Hopkins
- Olivier Meynet
- Xavier Bertoni
- Lynsey Dyer
- Manu Gaidet
- Kattia Griffiths
- JF Houle
- Kye Petersen
- Dan Treadway

Alpine

- Jean Claude Killy
- Pierrick Bourgeat
- Johan Clarey
- Didier Défago
- Gauthier de Tessieres
- Jean-Baptiste Grange
- Mattias Hargin
- Werner Heel
- Jan Hudec
- Christof Innerhofer
- Mike Janyk
- Lars Elton Myhre
- Manuel Osborne-Paradis
- Alessandro Roberto
- Jean-Philippe Roy
- Matik Skube
- Adrien Theaux
- Stéphane Tissot
- Silvan Zurbriggen
- Brigitte Acton
- Fränzi Aufdenblatten
- Anne-Sophie Barthet
- Nike Bent
- Marion Bertrand
- Catherine Borghi
- Stacey Cook
- Ana Drev
- Allison Forsyth
- Maria Pietilä Holmner
- Jessica Kelley
- Jessica Lindell-Vikarby
- Christina Lustenberger
- Tina Maze
- Urska Rabic
- Petra Robnik
- Geneviève Simard
- Vanessa Vidal
- Kathrin Wilhelm
- Tessa Worley
- Veronika Zuzulova
- Petra Vlhová

Snowboard

- Jonas Emery
- Mathieu Crépel
- Kjersti Buaas
- Xavier de Le Rue
- Jeremy Jones (1989-2009)
- Wyatt Caldwell
- Beji Ritche
- Doriane Vidal
- Erin Valvarde

Biathlon

- Martin Fourcade

== See also ==
- Lange
