= Lars Myhre =

Lars Myhre may refer to:

- Lars Elton Myhre (born 1984), retired Norwegian alpine skier
- Lars Martin Myhre (1956–2024), Norwegian composer, guitarist, pianist, singer, and producer
