= Davide Simoncelli =

Italian alpine skier

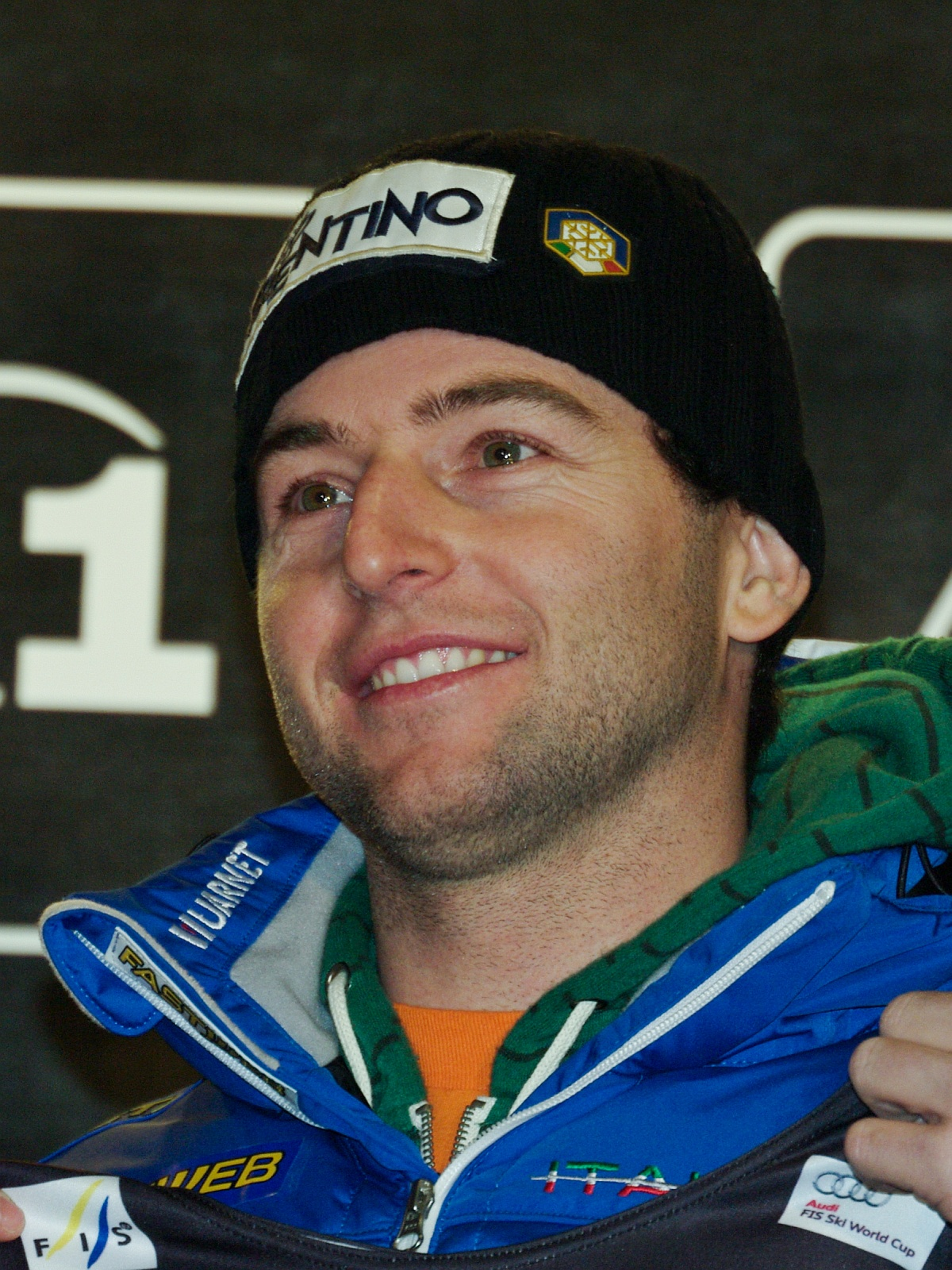
- Simoncelli in February 2011

Personal information
- Born: January 30, 1979 (age 47) Rovereto, Italy
- Height: 175 cm (5 ft 9 in)

Skiing career
- Sport: Alpine skiing
- Club: G.S. Fiamme Oro
- Retired: March 21, 2015 (age 36)
- Disciplines: Giant slalom
- World Cup debut: December 13, 1999 (age 20)

Olympics
- Teams: 2 – (2006–10)
- Medals: 0

World Championships
- Teams: 5 – (2001–05, 2009–11)
- Medals: 0

World Cup
- Seasons: 13 – (2001–13)
- Wins: 2 – (2 GS)
- Podiums: 8 – (8 GS)
- Overall titles: 0 – (22nd in 2010)
- Discipline titles: 0 – (4th in GS: 2006, 2010)

Davide Simoncelli (born January 30, 1979, in Rovereto) is a former World Cup alpine ski racer from Italy who specialized in giant slalom.

Simoncelli made his World Cup debut in 1999. He took two World Cup victories and eight podium finishes, all in giant slalom. He took five podiums on the Gran Risa track of Alta Badia, with a victory and four second places. He finished fourth in the World Cup points standings for giant slalom twice, in 2006 and 2010. Simoncelli competed for Italy in three Olympics and seven World Championships. He was also Italian giant slalom champion in 2012 and 2013. He announced his retirement from competition in March 2015.

== World Cup podiums ==
- 2 wins – (2 GS)
- 8 podiums – (8 GS)

Season	Date	Location	Discipline	Place
2003	22 Dec 2002	Alta Badia, Italy	Giant slalom	2nd
2004	14 Dec 2003	Alta Badia, Italy	Giant slalom	2nd
2004	21 Dec 2003	Alta Badia, Italy	Giant slalom	1st
2006	18 Dec 2005	Alta Badia, Italy	Giant slalom	2nd
2006	4 Mar 2006	Yongpyong, South Korea	Giant slalom	1st
2010	20 Dec 2009	Alta Badia, Italy	Giant slalom	2nd
2010	12 Mar 2010	Garmisch, Germany	Giant slalom	2nd
2013	2 Dec 2012	Beaver Creek, United States	Giant slalom	3rd

=== Season standings ===
Season	Age	Overall	Slalom	Giant slalom	Super G	Downhill	Combined
2001	22	109	—	41	—	—	—
2002	23	104	59	33	—	—	—
2003	24	60	—	19	—	—	—
2004	25	37	—	5	—	—	—
2005	26	38	—	8	—	—	—
2006	27	29	—	4	—	—	—
2007	28	64	—	12	—	—	45
2008	29	56	—	12	—	—	—
2009	30	73	—	23	—	—	—
2010	31	22	—	4	—	—	—
2011	32	73	—	16	—	—	—
2012	33	45	—	10	—	—	—
2013	34	40	—	11	—	—	—
2014	35	61	—	23	—	—	—
2015	36	57	—	15	—	—	—
