= Fränzi Aufdenblatten =

Swiss alpine skier (born 1981)

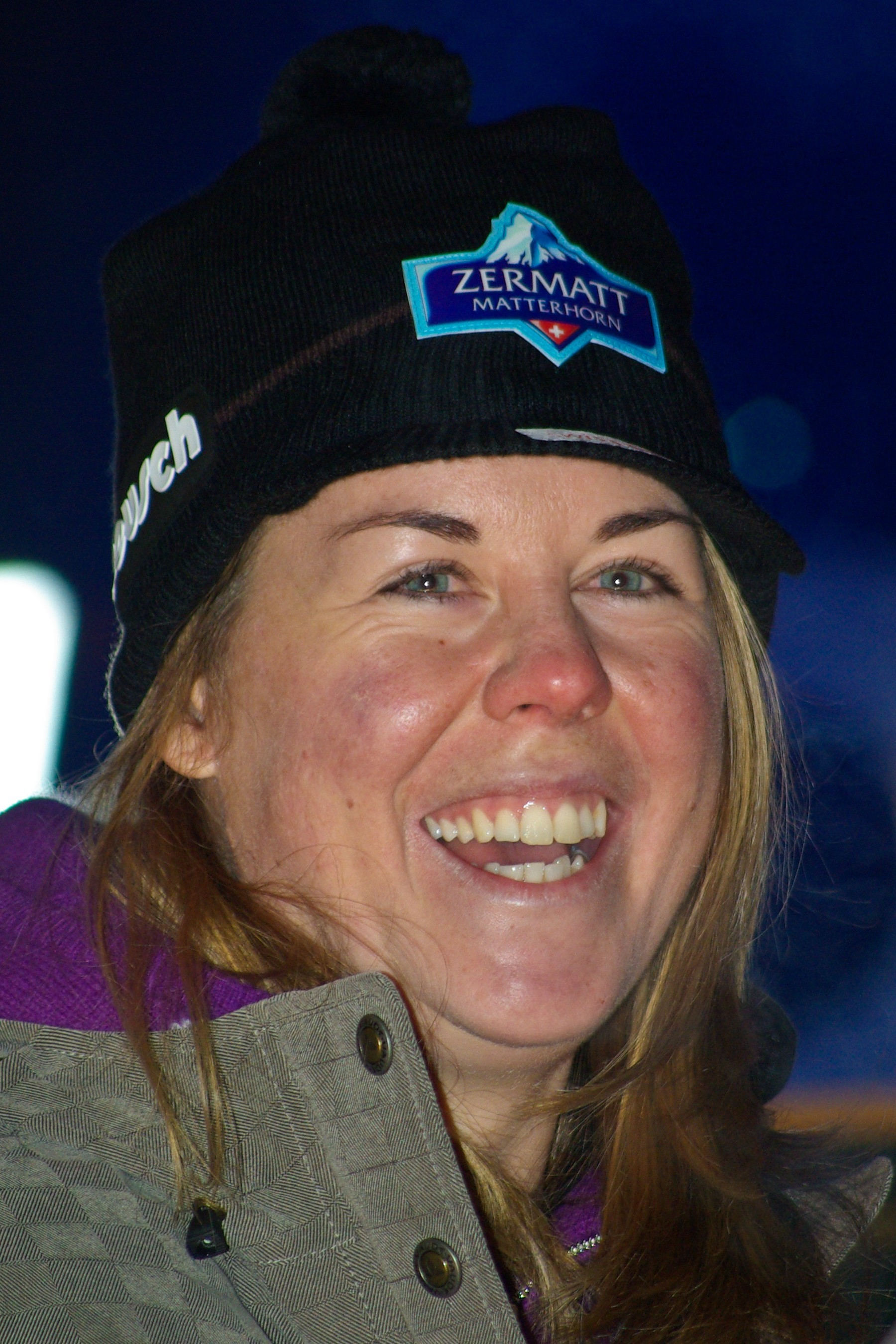
- Aufdenblatten in January 2009

Personal information
- Born: 10 February 1981 (age 45) Zermatt, Valais, Switzerland
- Height: 1.73 m (5 ft 8 in)
- Website: Fraenzi-Aufdenblatten.ch

Skiing career
- Sport: Alpine skiing
- Club: Zermatt
- Disciplines: Downhill, super-G, giant slalom, combined
- World Cup debut: 11 March 2000 (age 19)

Olympics
- Teams: 3 – (2002, 2006, 2014)
- Medals: 0

World Championships
- Teams: 5 – (2003–09, 2013)
- Medals: 0

World Cup
- Seasons: 11
- Wins: 1 – (1 SG
- Podiums: 4 – (3 DH, 1 SG)
- Overall titles: 0 – (18th in 2004)
- Discipline titles: 0 – (5th in DH, 2006)

Franziska Christine "Fränzi" Aufdenblatten (born 10 February 1981) is a retired Swiss World Cup alpine ski racer.

Born in Zermatt, Valais, Aufdenblatten made her World Cup debut in March 2000 in a giant slalom at Sestriere. She scored four podium finishes on the World Cup: one win in a super-G in Val-d'Isère in December 2009, and three third places in downhill at Haus im Ennstal (2004), Bad Kleinkirchheim (2006), and Lenzerheide (2014). Aufdenblatten competed in three Winter Olympics (2002, 2006 and 2014) and her best finish was a sixth place in the 2014 super-G at Rosa Khutor.

After the 2014 Games, Aufdenblatten announced that she would be retiring from competition at the end of the season in order to start a new career in sports management. After announcing her retirement, she scored a fourth and final World Cup podium finish with a third place in the downhill at the 2014 World Cup Finals at Lenzerheide in her native Switzerland.

== World Cup victories ==
Date	Location	Discipline
20 December 2009	Val-d'Isère, France	Super-G
