= Scott Macartney =

American alpine skier

Personal information
- Born: January 19, 1978 (age 48) Seattle, Washington, U.S.
- Height: 180 cm (5 ft 11 in)
- Website: Scott Macartney.com

Skiing career
- Sport: Alpine skiing
- Club: Crystal Mountain
- Disciplines: Downhill, Super G, Combined
- World Cup debut: November 27, 1999 (age 21)

Olympics
- Teams: 2 - (2002, 2006)
- Medals: 0

World Championships
- Teams: 2 - (2005, 2007)
- Medals: 0

World Cup
- Seasons: 10
- Wins: 0
- Podiums: 2
- Overall titles: 0
- Discipline titles: 0 - (15th in SG, 2006)

Scott Macartney (born January 19, 1978) is a retired American World Cup alpine ski racer. He concentrated in the speed events of downhill and super-G.

== Biography ==
Born in Seattle, Washington, Macartney was raised in suburban Redmond, where his parents were public school teachers. He skied at the Crystal Mountain ski area, located 75 miles (120 km) southeast of Seattle, where his parents were members of the volunteer ski patrol on weekends. Macartney did not attend a ski academy, but graduated from Redmond High School in 1996 while working his way up through regional teams in the Northwest with limited funding. He attended Dartmouth College in Hanover, New Hampshire, where he earned a bachelor's degree in economics.

Macartney competed at the 2002 Winter Olympics in Salt Lake City and was the first racer on the course in the downhill event at Snowbasin, and finished 29th. He attained his first World Cup podium on January 29, 2006, when he placed second at the Super-G in Garmisch-Partenkirchen, Germany.

A few weeks later, he competed in the 2006 Winter Olympics in Torino, where he finished 16th in the men's combined,
15th in the downhill and 7th in the super-G at Sestriere.

=== Injury at Kitzbühel ===
On his 30th birthday in 2008, Macartney competed in the Hahnenkamm downhill in Kitzbühel, Austria. The second racer on the course, he had an excellent run going until he suffered a spectacular fall just five seconds from the finish line. After descending the steep Zielschuss section and reaching a speed of 87.75 mph (141.22 km/h), Macartney was challenging for a top ten finish. At the final jump (Zielsprung), he was twisted left while airborne, could not recover, and crashed whilst finishing the race. He was airlifted by helicopter to a hospital in Innsbruck, said to have suffered bruising to the brain, and was put into an induced coma. He regained consciousness the next day. As Macartney did not miss a gate, he finished the race in 33rd place with a time of 1:55.91, 3.16 seconds behind the winner, Didier Cuche. Macartney's speed at the end of the Zielschuss was the highest of the race; the next closest speed was 86.5 mph (139.2 km/h) by Bode Miller, who tied for second.

Macartney recovered from his injuries and was named to the top team ("A Team") of the U.S. Ski Team for the 2008-09 World Cup season.

== World Cup results ==
=== Season standings ===
Season	Age	Overall	Slalom	Giant Slalom	Super G	Downhill	Combined
2002	24	135	—	—	—	52	—
2003	25	55	—	—	—	—	13
2004	26	135	—	—	43	—	—
2005	27	114	—	—	51	57	16
2006	28	42	—	—	15	26	39
2007	29	70	—	—	37	29	—
2008	30	70	—	—	34	26	—
2009	31	95	—	—	44	36	—
2010	32	138	—	—	—	50	—

=== Top Ten finishes ===
- 2 podiums – (1 DH, 1 SG)

Season	Date	Location	Race	Place
2003	19 Jan 2003	Wengen, Switzerland	Combined	8th
2006	16 Dec 2005	Val Gardena, Italy	Super-G	7th
2006	29 Jan 2006	Garmisch, Germany	Super-G	2nd
2006	2006 Winter Olympics			
2007	1 Dec 2006	Beaver Creek, CO, USA	Downhill	8th
2008	15 Dec 2007	Val Gardena, Italy	Downhill	3rd

== World Championship results ==
Year	Age	Slalom	Giant Slalom	Super G	Downhill	Combined
2005	27	—	—	28	—	—
2007	29	—	—	31	30	—

== Olympic results ==
Year	Age	Slalom	Giant Slalom	Super G	Downhill	Combined
2002	24	—	—	25	29	—
2006	28	—	—	7	15	16
