= Nike Bent =

Swedish alpine skier

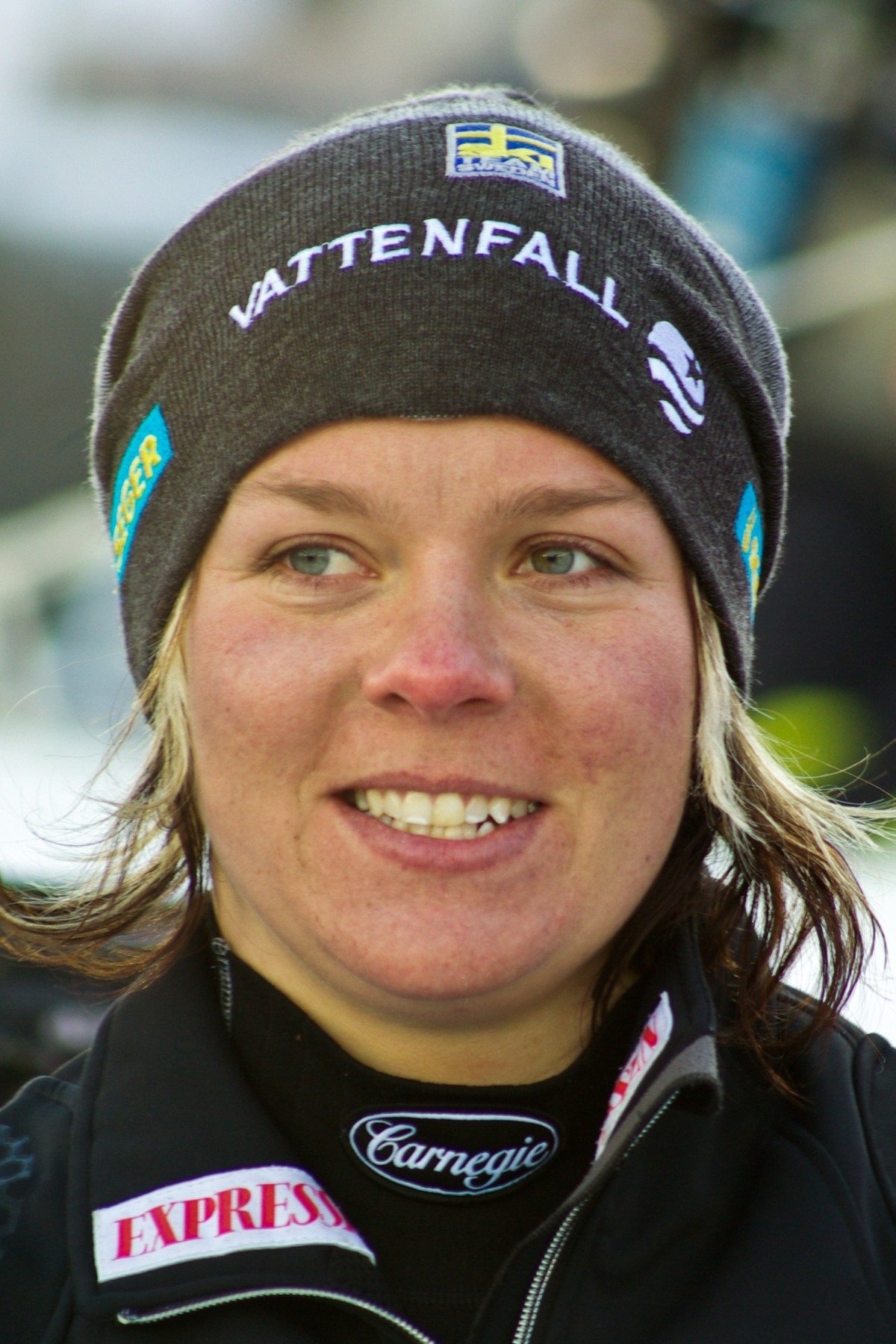
- Nike Bent during World Cup competitions in Altenmarkt-Zauchensee, Austria in January 2009

Personal information
- Nationality: Sweden
- Born: 1 December 1981 (age 44) Funäsdalen, Sweden

Sport
- Sport: Skiing

Nike Bent (born 1 December 1981) is a Swedish former alpine skier who competed in the 2006 Winter Olympics.

On 18 August 2010, she announced her retirement from alpine skiing following knee injuries.
