= Akira Sasaki =

Japanese alpine skier (born 1981)

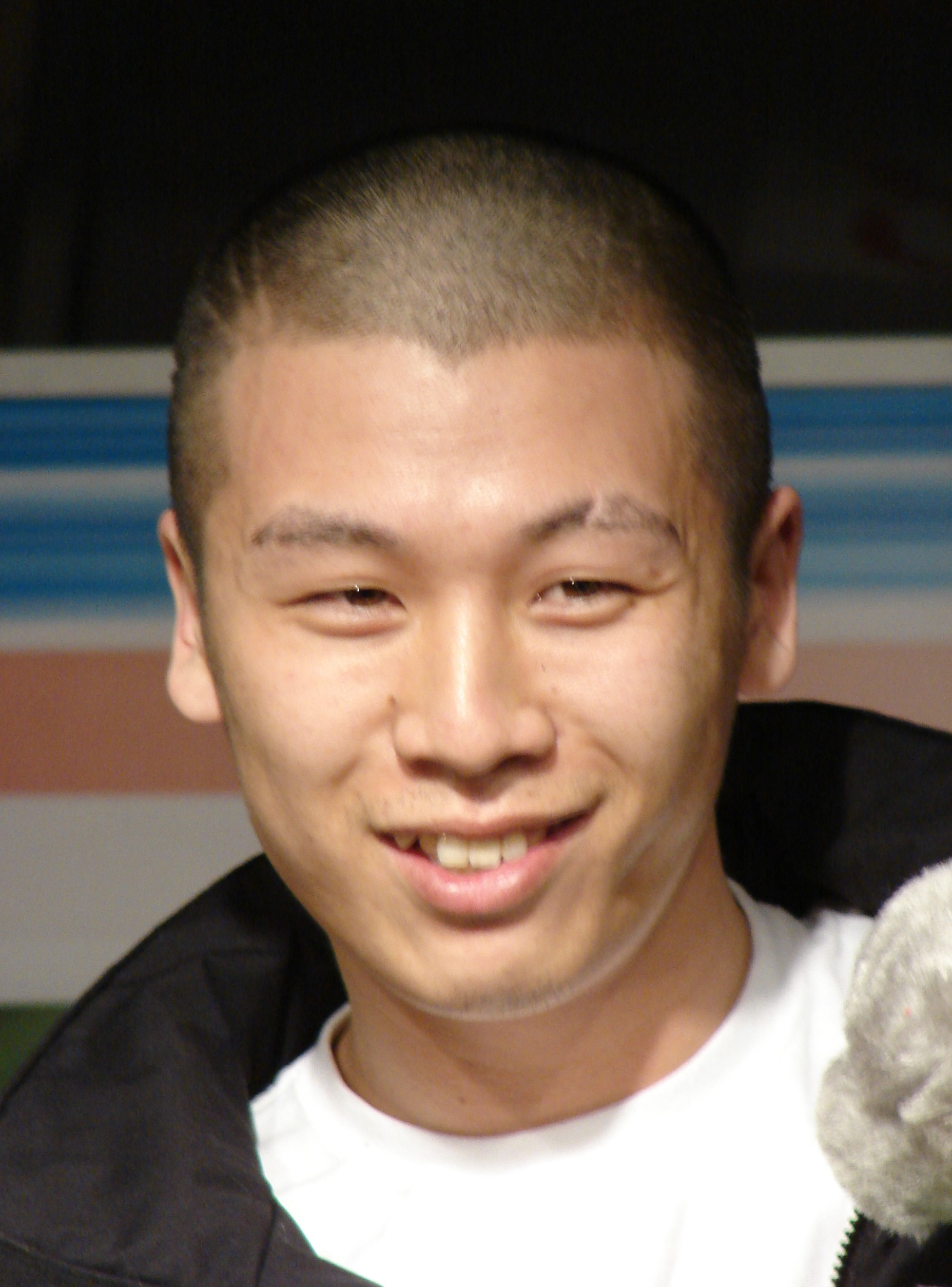
Sasaki Akira

Akira Sasaki (佐々木 明, Sasaki Akira, born September 26, 1981) is a Japanese alpine skier.

At the 2002 Winter Olympics, Sasaki ranked 34th in the giant slalom. He did not finish in the slalom event.

His best result in the Alpine Skiing World Cup is from 2003 slalom in Wengen, where he finished in a surprising second place with starting number 65. His other best results are fourth places in Kranjska Gora in 2004 and in Beaver Creek in 2005, fifth in Sestriere 2004 and 2005, and second in Schladming and in Shigakōgen in 2006.

In giant slalom, his best result in the World Cup was the 24th place in Sölden in 2004.

Sasaki represented Japan at the 2006 Winter Olympics participating in slalom and giant slalom, but did not finish in these events.

In Vancouver 2010 Winter Olympics Sasaki placed 14th in the men's slalom

== World Cup podiums ==
- 3 podiums – (3 SL)

Season	Date	Location	Discipline	Place
2003	21 Jan 2003	(Switzerland) Wengen	Slalom	2nd
2006	24 Jan 2006	(Austria) Schladming	Slalom	2nd
2006	10 Mar 2006	(Japan) Shigakōgen	Slalom	2nd
