= Reinfried Herbst =

Austrian alpine skier

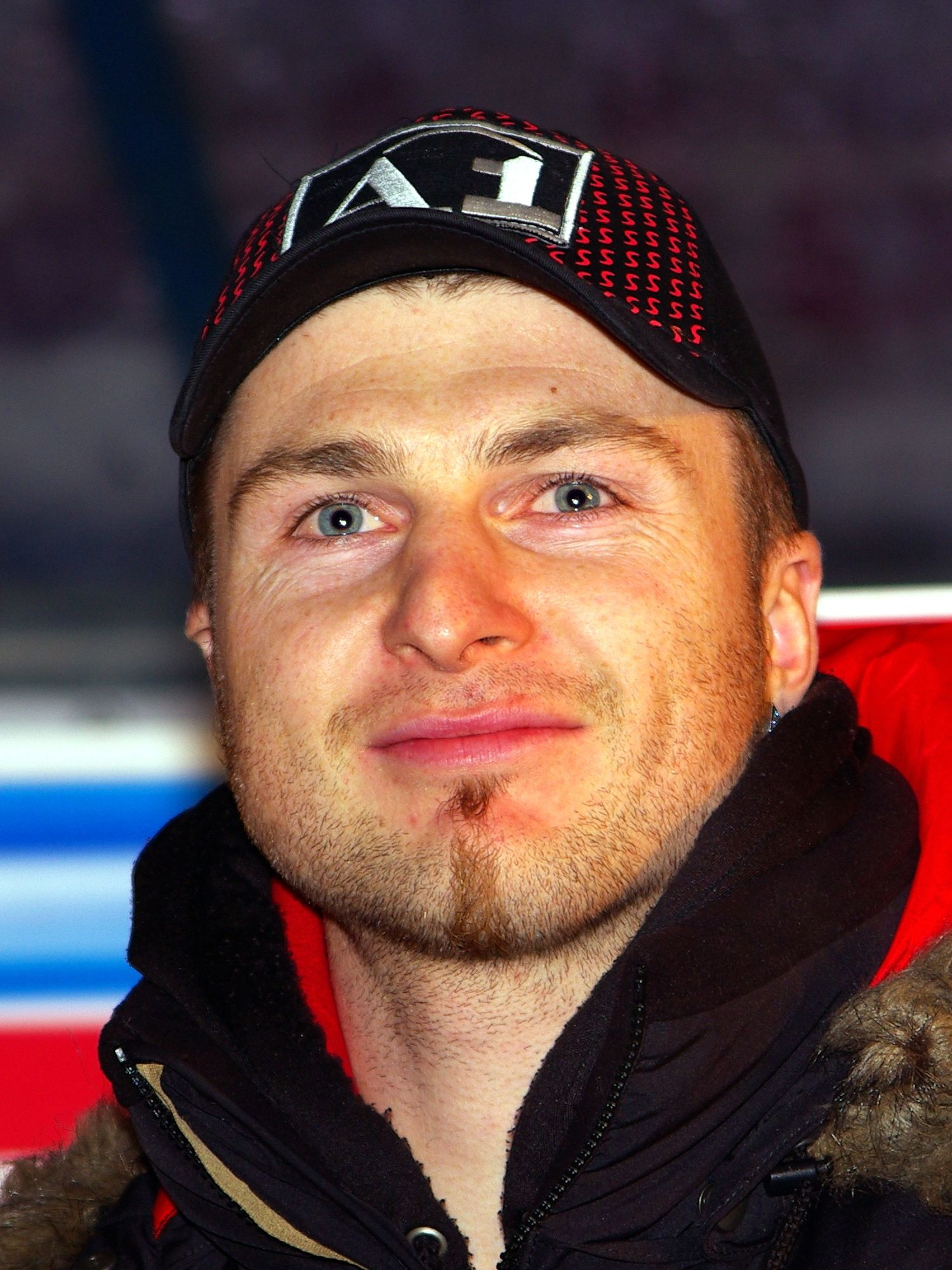

Personal information
- Born: October 11, 1978 (age 47) Salzburg, Salzburg, Austria
- Height: 181 cm (5 ft 11 in)
- Website: reini-herbst.com

Skiing career
- Sport: Alpine skiing
- Club: Skiklub Unken
- Retired: March 3, 2016 (age 37)
- Disciplines: Slalom
- World Cup debut: January 21, 2001 (age 22)

Olympics
- Teams: 3 – (2006–2014)
- Medals: 1 (0 gold)

World Championships
- Teams: 4 – (2007–2011, 2015)
- Medals: 0

World Cup
- Seasons: 16 – (2001–2016)
- Wins: 9 – (9 SL)
- Podiums: 16
- Overall titles: 0
- Discipline titles: 1 (SL)
Medal record
Men's alpine skiing
Representing Austria
Olympic Games
Silver medal – second place	2006 Turin	Slalom

Reinfried Herbst (born 11 October 1978 in Salzburg) is a retired slalom skier from Austria. Herbst won the silver medal for the men's slalom event at the 2006 Winter Olympics in Turin, Italy.

On 11 March 2006 he won his first World Cup race in Shigakogen Slalom. He was 8th in the slalom World Cup standings after the 2006 season. In July, 2006 he injured his knee in a charity soccer game. After two victories in the 2008 season he finished 3rd in the slalom world cup.

== World Cup results ==
=== Season titles ===
Season	Discipline
2010	Slalom

=== Season standings ===
Season	Age	Overall	Slalom
2003	24	115	43
2005	26	106	40
2006	27	28	8
2007	28	57	20
2008	29	20	3
2009	30	23	5
2010	31	11	1
2011	32	30	9
2012	33	66	25
2013	34	33	11
2014	35	46	14
2015	36	71	22
2016	37	135	47

=== Race podiums ===
- 9 wins (9 Slalom)
- 16 podiums (16 Slalom)

Season	Date	Location	Discipline	Place
2006	22 January 2006	(Austria) Kitzbuehel	Slalom	2nd
2006	11 March 2006	(Japan) Shigakogen	Slalom	1st
2008	9 February 2008	(Germany) Garmisch-Partenkirchen	Slalom	1st
2008	17 February 2008	(Croatia) Zagreb	Slalom	3rd
2008	15 March 2008	(Italy) Bormio	Slalom	1st
2009	11 January 2009	(Switzerland) Adelboden	Slalom	1st
2009	18 January 2009	(Switzerland) Wengen	Slalom	2nd
2009	27 January 2009	(Austria) Schladming	Slalom	1st
2009	1 February 2009	(Germany) Garmisch-Partenkirchen	Slalom	3rd
2010	15 November 2009	(Finland) Levi	Slalom	1st
2010	21 December 2009	(Italy) Alta Badia	Slalom	1st
2010	17 January 2010	(Switzerland) Wengen	Slalom	3rd
2010	26 January 2010	(Austria) Schladming	Slalom	1st
2010	31 January 2010	(Slovenia) Kranjska Gora	Slalom	1st
2011	9 January 2011	(Switzerland) Adelboden	Slalom	3rd
2011	27 February 2011	(Bulgaria) Bansko	Slalom	2nd

== Olympic results ==
Year	Age	Slalom
2006	27	2
2010	31	10

== World Championships results ==
Year	Age	Slalom
2007	28	DNF1
2009	30	DNF1
2011	32	DNF2
2015	36	12
