= Hannes Paul Schmid =

Italian alpine skier (born 1980)

Hannes Paul Schmid (born 19 November 1980 in Bruneck) is an Italian former alpine skier who competed in the 2006 Winter Olympics.
