= Jukka Rajala =

Finnish alpine skier (born 1982)

Jukka Rajala (born 13 April 1982 in Kuusankoski) is a Finnish former alpine skier who competed in the 2006 Winter Olympics.
