= François Bourque =

Canadian alpine skier (born 1984)

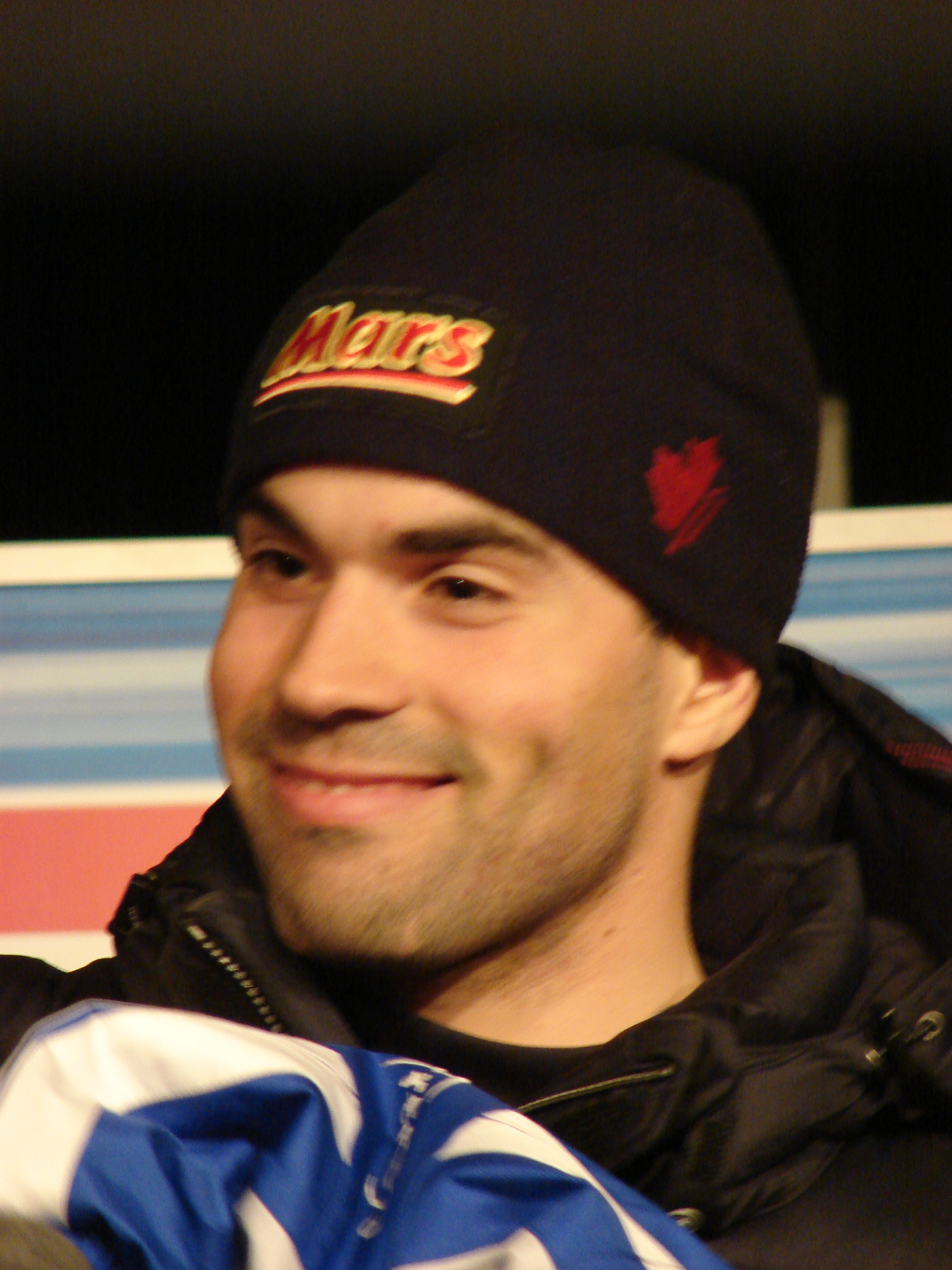
François Bourque

François Bourque (born November 18, 1984, in New Richmond, Quebec) is a Canadian alpine skier.

François Bourque Began his national debut in 2002. Bourque won the super-G event at the 2003 Junior World Championships and the combined event at the 2004 Junior World Championships. In the 2005 season, he picked up a third-place finish in the super-G in a World Cup event in Garmisch, Germany. In the 2006 season he picked up another third-place finish at a World Cup event, this time in the Giant Slalom in Alta Badia, Italy. At the 2006 Winter Olympics Bourque finished in 4th place in the Giant Slalom event and 8th place in the Super-G event.
