= Andrej Šporn =

Slovenian alpine skier (born 1981)

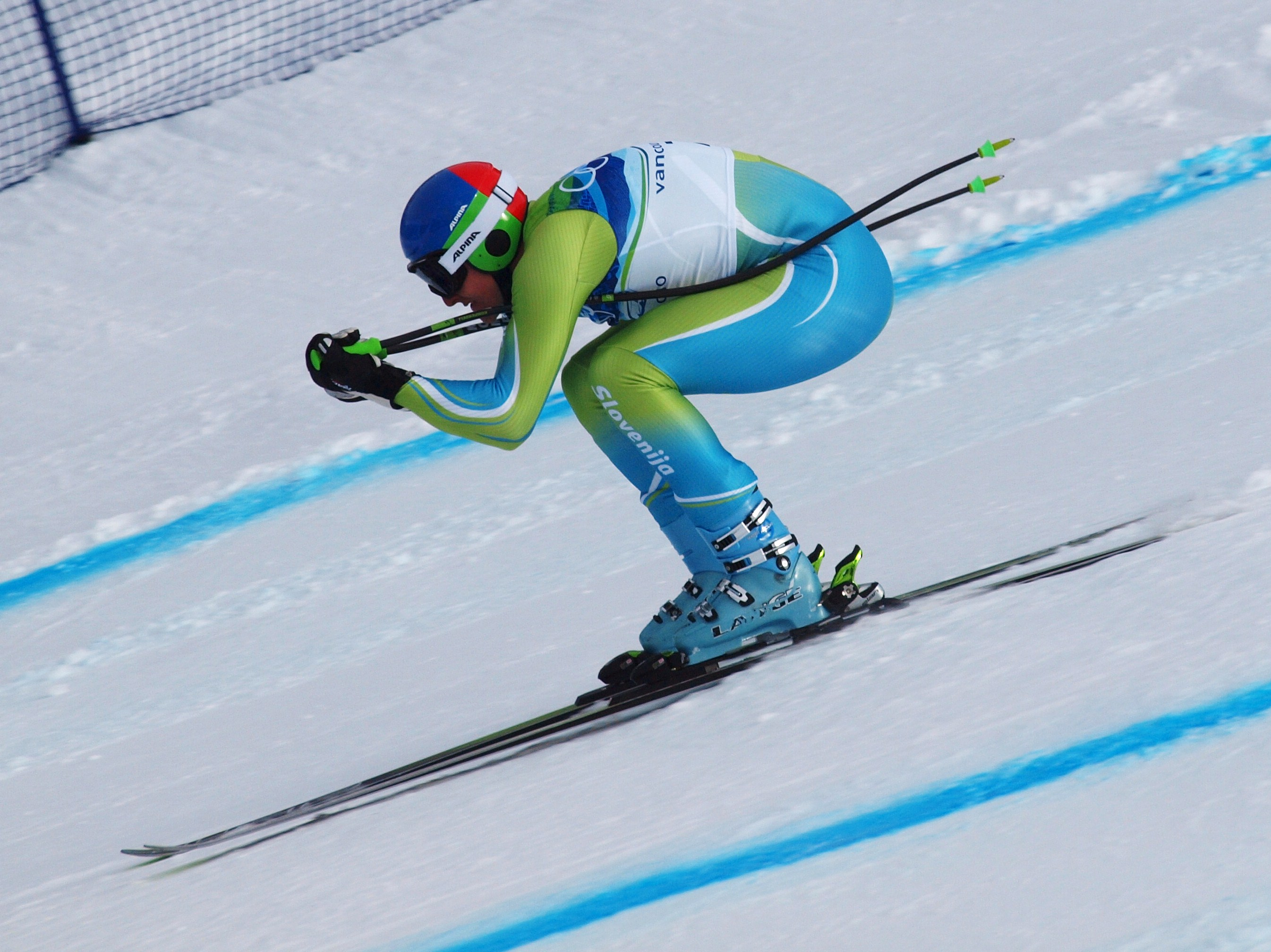
- Šporn in 2010

Personal information
- Born: 1 December 1981 (age 44) Kranjska Gora, Slovenia
- Height: 1.88 m (6 ft 2 in)

Skiing career
- Sport: Alpine skiing
- Club: KRG – ASK Kranjska Gora
- Disciplines: Downhill, Super-G, Combined
- World Cup debut: 10 December 2001

World Cup
- Seasons: 9
- Podiums: 1

Andrej Šporn (born 1 December 1981 in Kranjska Gora) is a former Slovenian alpine skier.

Šporn began his career as a competitor in slalom, though he had always shown great talent in both fast disciplines – the downhill and Super-G – and is also good in giant slalom. He was a successful competitor from an early age, having won competitions in his native Slovenia in the junior category. He did very well at the Junior World Ski Championship and finished in the top ten in slalom as well as downhill. In the 2003/04 season, he shined in the European Cup in which he won finished 4th in the slalom standings. One of his early successes at that level was the slalom win at the Universiade in Zakopane, Poland, in February 2001.

After having had mainly focused on slalom, after the super combination had been introduced as a new discipline, he started to compete in downhill, too. Good results convinced him to start training fast disciplines as main ones and he had help of top trainers with that.

His debut in the Ski World Cup was in a slalom race at Beaver Creek in 2004 in which was he finished 8th. place. In 2006, his best results were 6th place in the classic alpine combination in Kitzbuhel and also 6th place in the super alpine combination in Chamonix. He also had a good season in downhill, finishing 2nd in Kitzbuhel, 5th in Kvitfjell and 6th in Bormio.

Šporn participated at two Winter Olympics, in Torino in 2006 and in Vancouver in 2010, but did not achieve any remarkable results.

In 2011, at the Ski World Championship in Garmisch-Partenkirchen, he achieved great success by finishing 6th in the downhill race.

Following an injury in 2017, Šporn announced his retirement from competitive sport.

== World Cup results ==
=== Season standings ===
Season	Age	Overall	Slalom	Giant slalom	Super-G	Downhill	Combined
2004	22	77	45	—	—	—	9
2005	23	89	35	—	—	—	—
2006	24	52	56	—	—	—	8
2007	25	101	—	—	30	—	39
2008	26	102	—	—	51	61	34
2009	27	102	—	—	48	41	36
2010	28	31	—	—	35	10	32
2011	29	38	—	—	24	13	—
2012	30	53	—	—	46	21	—
2013	31	61	—	—	44	23	—
2014	32	120	—	—	—	46	—
2015	33	—	—	—	—	—	—
2016	34	107	—	—	—	40	—

=== Race podiums ===
Season	Date	Location	Discipline	Position
2010	23 January 2010	Kitzbühel, Austria	Downhill	2nd

== See also ==
- Races of Andrej Sporn in Alpine world cup skiing
- Races of Andrej Sporn on Youtube
