= Giorgio Rocca =

Italian alpine skier (born 1975)

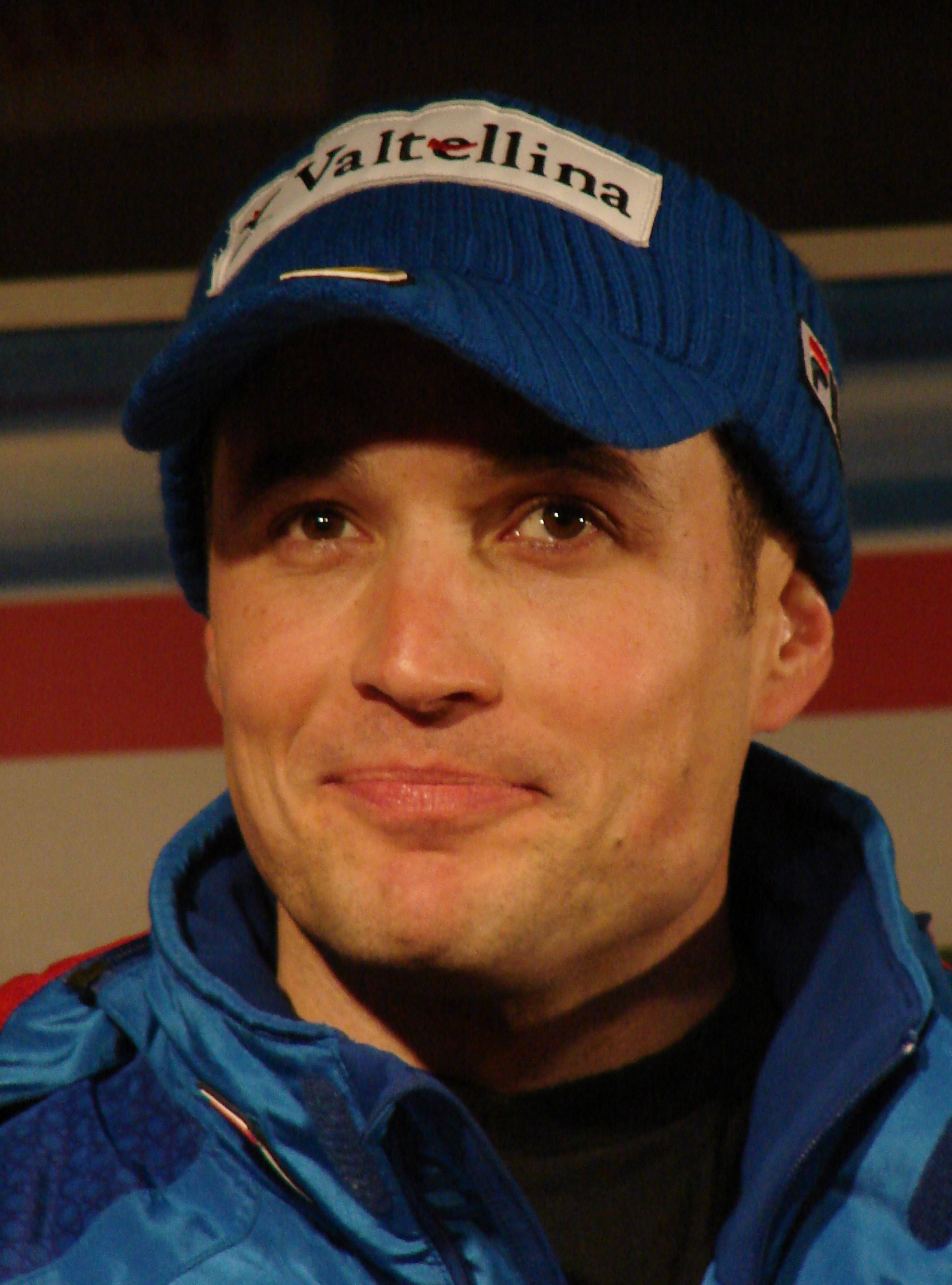

Personal information
- Born: 6 August 1975 (age 51) Chur, Grisons, Switzerland
- Height: 1.82 m (6 ft 0 in)

Skiing career
- Sport: Alpine skiing
- Club: C.S. Carabinieri
- Retired: 2010
- Disciplines: Technical events
- World Cup debut: 1993

Olympics
- Teams: 2
- Medals: 0

World Championships
- Teams: 6
- Medals: 3 (0 gold)

World Cup
- Seasons: 18
- Wins: 11
- Podiums: 22
- Overall titles: 0
- Discipline titles: 1
Medal record
International alpine ski competitions
Event	1st	2nd	3rd
World Championships	0	0	3
World Junior Championships	0	0	1
Total	0	0	4
World Cup race podiums
Event	1st	2nd	3rd
Slalom	11	6	4
Combined	0	1	0
Total	11	7	4
World Championships
Bronze medal – third place	2003 St. Moritz	Slalom
Bronze medal – third place	2005 Bormio	Slalom
Bronze medal – third place	2005 Bormio	Combined

Giorgio Rocca (born 6 August 1975) is an Italian former alpine skier, a specialist in slalom skiing. Together with Marc Girardelli, Ingemar Stenmark and Marcel Hirscher, he is one of four skiers to have won 5 Alpine Skiing World Cup slaloms in a row, which he achieved in the 2005/2006 season: only Alberto Tomba (7) has won more World Cup slaloms consecutively. He is currently ninth in the list of all-time slalom winners, with a total of 11 victories.

== Biography ==
Rocca was born in Chur, Switzerland. His father is Italian from Livigno and his mother is Romansh from Scuol in the Lower Engadine. He made his debut in the Alpine Skiing World Cup on 6 January 1996 in Flachau. However, Rocca broke his right knee and was forced off the tour for a year. In March 1997, he scored his first point-scoring result in the World Cup, at the Shigakogen slalom. He scored his first top-ten finish in November 1998, at the Aspen slalom.

One year later, Rocca finally secured his first podium finish, scoring a third place in the renowned Kitzbühel slalom. In 1999, he won the bronze medal at the Alpine World Skiing Championships in Vail. Rocca began to be considered the legitimate heir of Italy's Alberto Tomba, who had just retired. This responsibility, however, seemed to crush Rocca and stunted his progress, together with another knee accident.

After two difficult seasons, in 2001 Rocca was again on the podium, with second places in Aspen and Madonna di Campiglio. In January 2003, after another 2nd in the Sestriere slalom, Rocca finally won his first World Cup race on the Lauberhorn piste at Wengen in Switzerland. In the 2005 season, he took two victories at Chamonix and Flachau, and two bronze medals at his home World Championship in Bormio, in the slalom and the combined. Rocca won again in February 2005, this time at Kranjska Gora, and for a while was in contention for the Slalom World Cup title for the season.

Rocca started the 2005/2006 season with an impressive series of five wins in a row in the first five slalom races. He explained his notable improvements from a psychological point of view, as he had taken advantage of the help of a team of psychologists to solve the alleged fragility that had thwarted him in past seasons.

Rocca currently lives in Livigno. In his career, he competed for C.S. Carabinieri.

He recited the Olympic oath at the 2006 Winter Olympics Opening Ceremony. It was at these Olympics that he was hoping to win gold in his strongest event: slalom, after his great success in the World Championships, so he decided to focus on this event. He did not enter the Giant Slalom or Super-G as originally planned; however, he did compete in the Combined race, where he placed 5th with a total time of 3:10.74. In the Slalom, he was the first starter, but he straddled at the second gate, throwing away his chances of being champion.

In January 2010, Rocca confirmed his retirement from competition, bringing forward plans to end his racing career at the end of the season due to his sustaining a groin injury in training which prevented him from competing at the 2010 Winter Olympics.

Giorgio Rocca is Roman Catholic.

== World Cup results ==
=== Overall ===
Season	Discipline
2006	Slalom

=== Individual victories ===
Date	Location	Race
19 January 2003	Wengen	Slalom
16 March 2003	Lillehammer	Slalom
11 January 2004	Chamonix	Slalom
22 December 2004	Flachau	Slalom
9 January 2005	Chamonix	Slalom
27 February 2005	Kranjska Gora	Slalom
4 December 2005	Beaver Creek	Slalom
12 December 2005	Madonna di Campiglio	Slalom
22 December 2005	Kranjska Gora	Slalom
8 January 2006	Adelboden	Slalom
15 January 2006	Wengen	Slalom

== See also ==
- Italian skiers with the most podiums in the World Cup
