= Alois Vogl =

German alpine skier (born 1972)

Alois Vogl (born 15 September 1972 in Neukirchen beim Heiligen Blut) is a retired German alpine skier.

He represented Germany at the 2006 Winter Olympics. He also has one victory in the World Cup, 2005 slalom in Wengen.
