= Rainer Schönfelder =

Austrian alpine skier

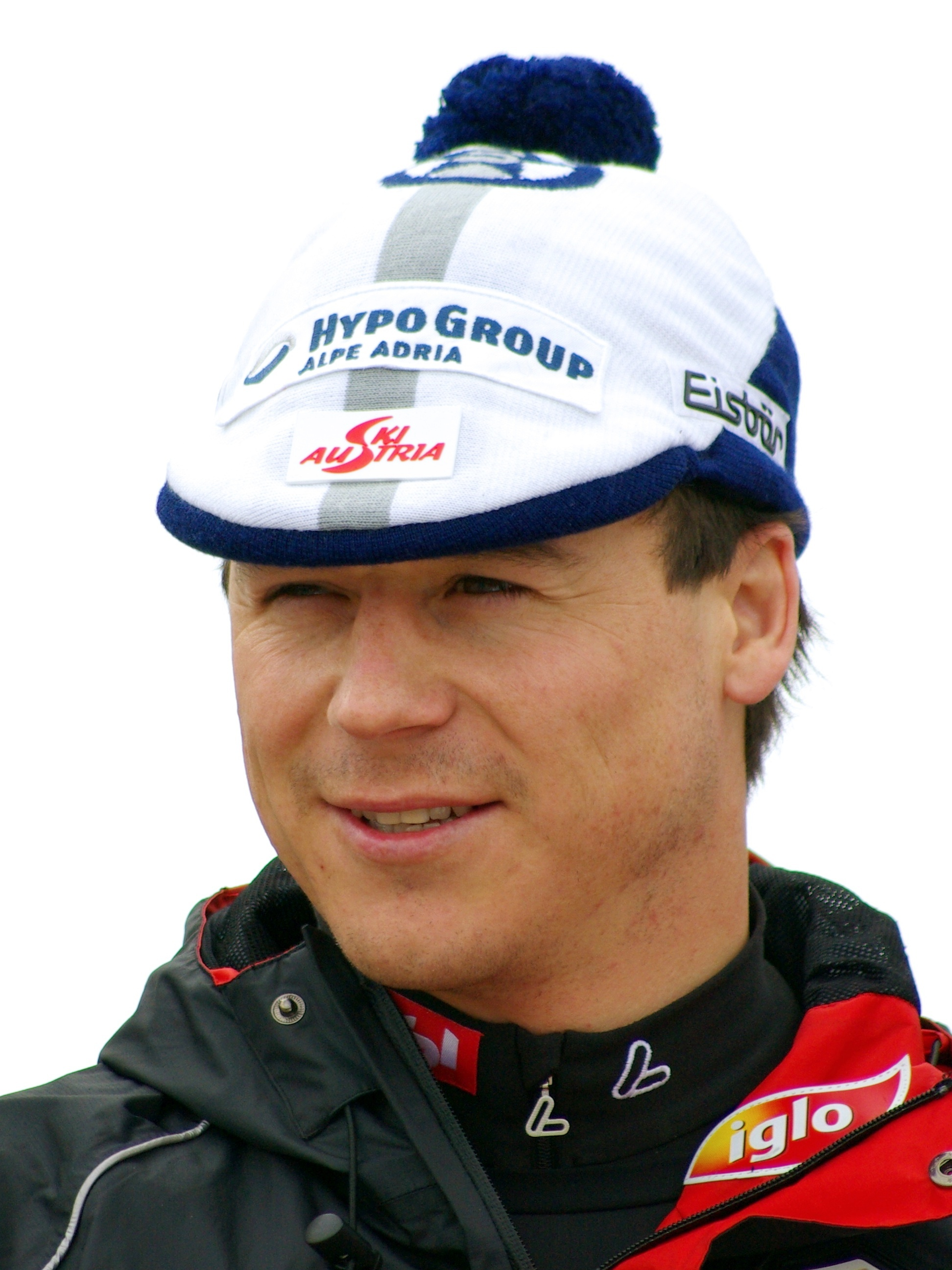

Medal record

Men's alpine skiing

Representing Austria

Olympic Games
Bronze medal – third place	2006 Turin	Combined
Bronze medal – third place	2006 Turin	Slalom

World Championships
Silver medal – second place	2005 Bormio	Team Event

Rainer Schönfelder (born 13 June 1977) is an Austrian former skier who won the 2003–2004 men's World Cup slalom title.

== Career ==
Born in Bleiburg, Carinthia, Austria, Schönfelder made his debut in the 1995–1996 season, finishing 115th in the overall rankings. He quickly began to excel in the slalom events, and improved his position in the overall World Cup standing to 10th place by the 2003–2004 season.

Apart from his slalom success in the 2003–2004 World Cup, his other achievements include 2 bronze medals (combined and slalom) at the 2006 Winter Olympics in Torino, Italy and a 4th place in the combined event at the 2002 Winter Olympics in Salt Lake City.

On 27 March 2004, Schönfelder tested positive for the stimulant Etilephrine at the Austrian slalom championships. However, he was not banned and continued competing in 2004–05, since it was found that he had taken the substance inadvertently while undergoing treatment of influenza.

Rainer Schönfelder has also had some success as a pop singer in Austria, especially with a cover version of Wolfgang Ambros' classic hit "Schifoan" (meaning "skiing").

Schönfelder made headlines on 10 January 2007 by skiing nude after losing a bet with his physiotherapist.

== Trivia ==
Before the race in Chamonix Schönfelder slipped in the bathroom and got a contusion on his testicles.

== World Cup results ==
=== Overall ===
Season	Discipline
2004	Slalom

=== Individual victories ===
Date	Location	Race
6 February 2000	(Germany) Todtnau	Slalom
20 January 2002	(Austria) Kitzbühel	Slalom
24 November 2002	(United States) Park City	Slalom
8 March 2003	(Japan) Shigakogen	Slalom
8 February 2004	(Switzerland) Adelboden	Slalom

=== Season standings ===
Season	Age	Overall	Slalom	Giant Slalom	Super G	Downhill	Combined
1996	18	115	–	39	—	—	—
1997	19	Did not score a point					
1998	20	Did not score a point					
1999	21	63	24	—	—	—	—
2000	22	25	7	29	—	—	—
2001	23	28	9	36	—	—	—
2002	24	26	5	40	—	—	—
2003	25	16	3	31	—	—	—
2004	26	10	1	21	—	—	—
2005	27	14	2	21	—	—	—
2006	28	14	14	13	35	—	4
2007	29	34	26	18	—	—	8
2008	30	15	17	20	53	29	5
2009	31	123	59	49	—	—	—
2010	32	127	50	—	—	—	—
2011	33	Did not score a point					
2012	34	127	42	—	—	—	—
2013	35	Did not score a point					
