= Lars Elton Myhre =

Norwegian alpine skier (born 1984)

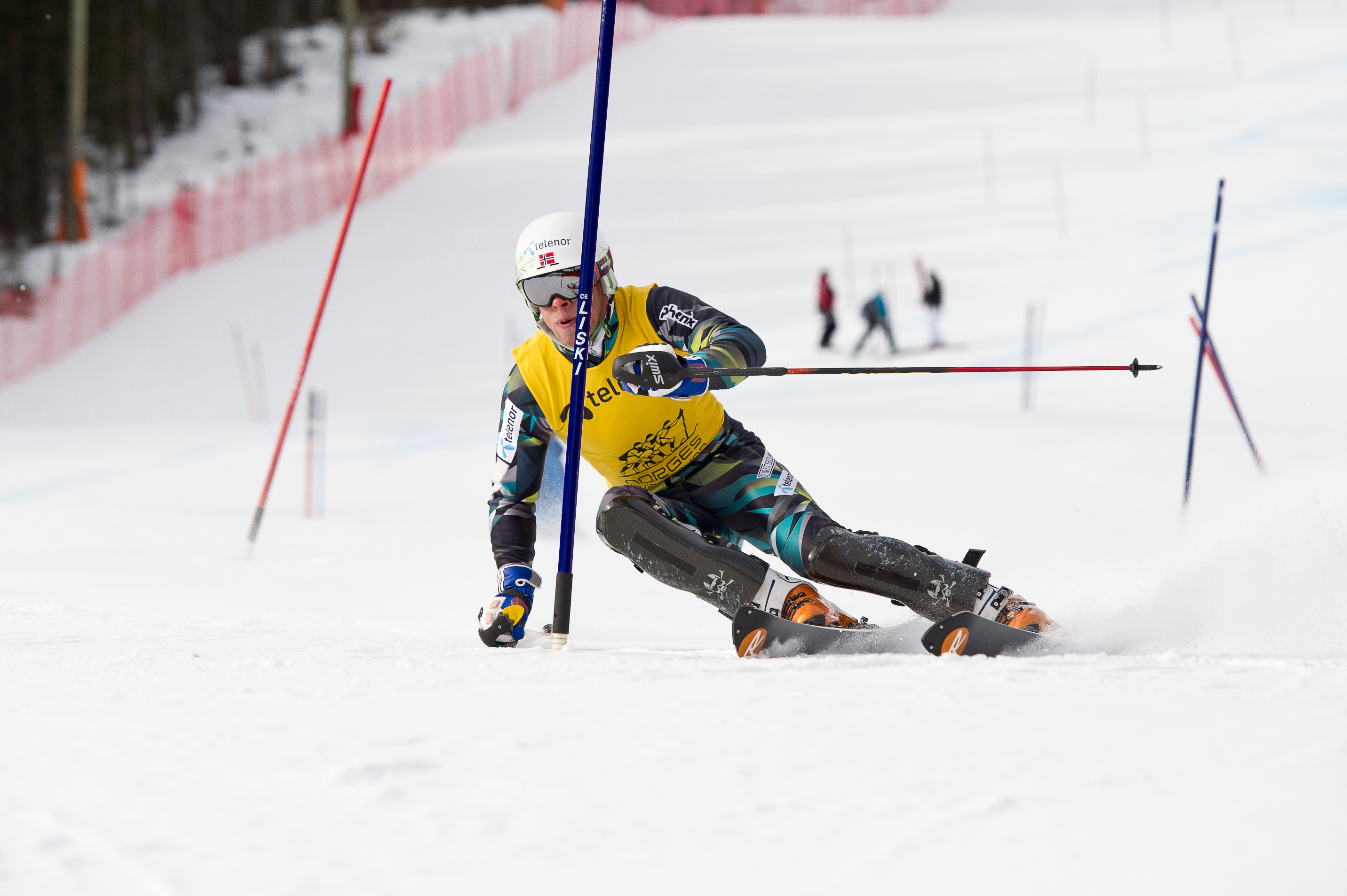
Lars Elton Myhre

Lars Elton Myhre (born 17 August 1984) is a retired Norwegian alpine skier. He primarily competed in slalom and combined events. Myhre took a bronze medal at the World Junior Championships in 2004, and made his World Cup debut the same year. He participated in slalom at the 2006 Winter Olympics in Turin. He represented Norway at the 2010 Winter Olympics in Vancouver, British Columbia, Canada. Myhre scored a total of nine top 10 finishes in the Alpine Skiing World Cup, with a best result of fifth in a Super Combined in Beaver Creek in 2007. He announced his retirement from competition via social media in November 2013 after suffering long term back problems. He joined TV 2 the same month as a pundit, having previously worked sporadically as a commentator with NRK when injured during his ski career.
