= Markus Larsson =

Swedish alpine skier

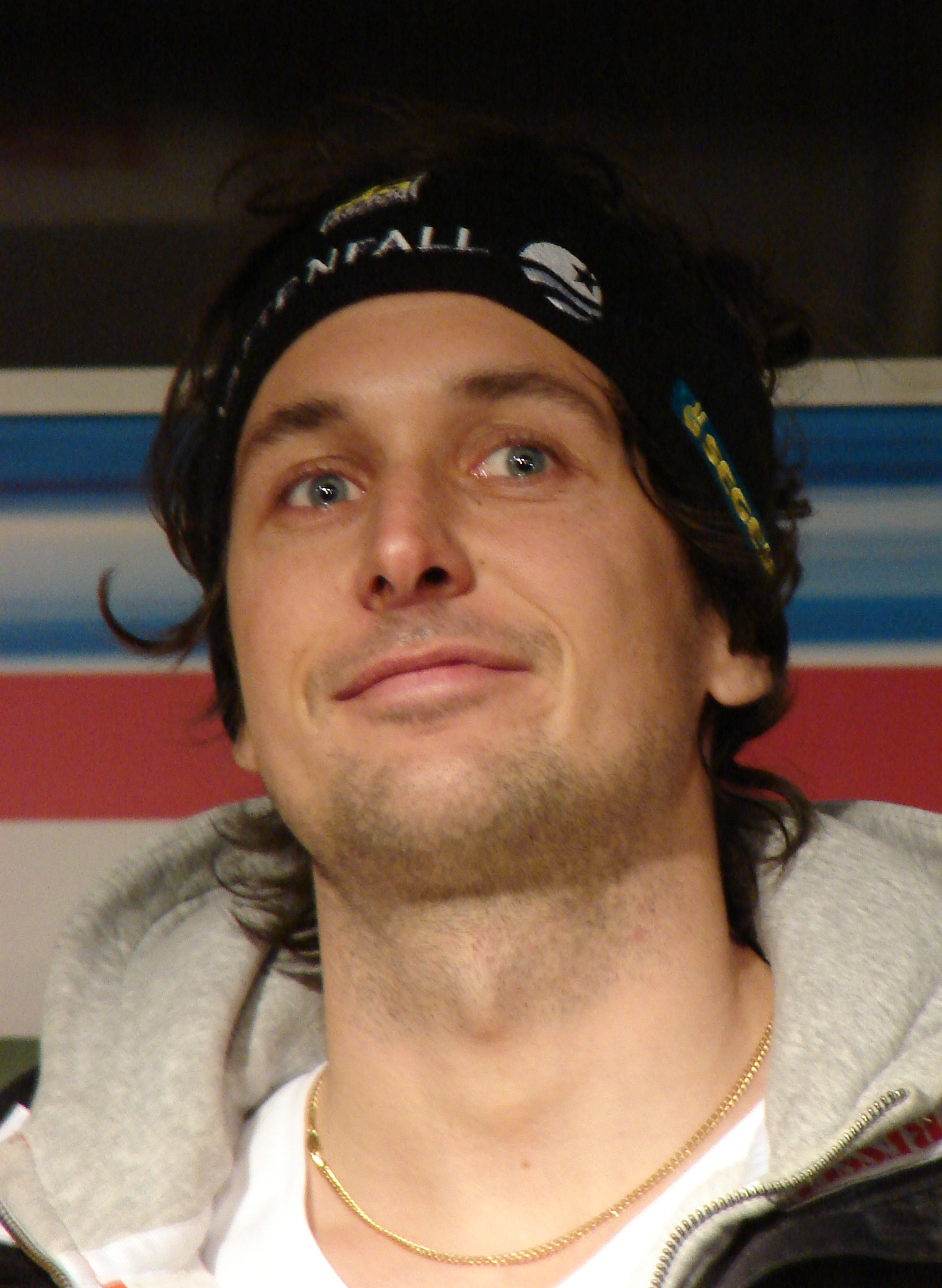
- Markus Larsson

Personal information
- Born: 9 January 1979 (age 47) Kil, Sweden

Skiing career
- Sport: Alpine skiing
- Club: Karlstads SLK
- Retired: 10 January 2016
- World Cup debut: 23 November 1999

Olympics
- Teams: 4
- Medals: 0

World Championships
- Teams: 6
- Medals: 0

World Cup
- Seasons: 17
- Wins: 2
- Podiums: 4
Medal record
Men's alpine skiing
Representing Sweden
World Championships
Silver medal – second place	2007 Åre	Team event
Bronze medal – third place	2015 Beaver Creek	Team event
Junior World Ski Championships
Silver medal – second place	1997 Schladming	Super-G
Bronze medal – third place	1997 Schladming	Giant slalom

Markus Larsson (born 9 January 1979) is a retired Swedish alpine skier who took part in the 2002, 2006, 2010 and 2014 Winter Olympics.

Larsson was born in Kil, Värmland County. He won a bronze medal in the 1995 European Youth Olympic Winter Days in Andorra la Vella.

On 9 May 2016, he announced his retirement from alpine skiing.

== World Cup results ==
=== Race podiums ===
Season	Date	Location	Discipline	Place
2005	9 January 2005	Chamonix, France	Slalom	3rd
2006	18 March 2006	Åre, Sweden	Slalom	1st
2007	12 November 2006	Levi, Finland	Slalom	2nd
2007	18 December 2006	Alta Badia, Italy	Slalom	1st

=== Season standings ===
Season	Age	Overall	Slalom	Giant slalom	Super-G	Downhill	Combined
2001	22	122	48	—	—	—	—
2002	23	51	17	—	—	—	—
2003	24	68	26	—	—	—	—
2004	25	53	28	–	–	–	13
2005	26	37	11	–	–	–	9
2006	27	26	9	53	–	–	29
2007	28	22	4	32	–	–	39
2008	29	36	24	26	–	–	13
2009	30	44	26	24	–	–	16
2010	31	46	27	24	–	–	20
2011	32	49	21	36	—	—	—
2012	33	61	23	—	—	—	—
2013	34	42	15	—	—	—	—
2014	35	39	11	—	—	—	—
2015	36	36	11	—	—	—	—
2016*	37	139	50	—	—	—	—

* Injured after 4 races.
