= Thomas Grandi =

Canadian alpine skier (born 1972)

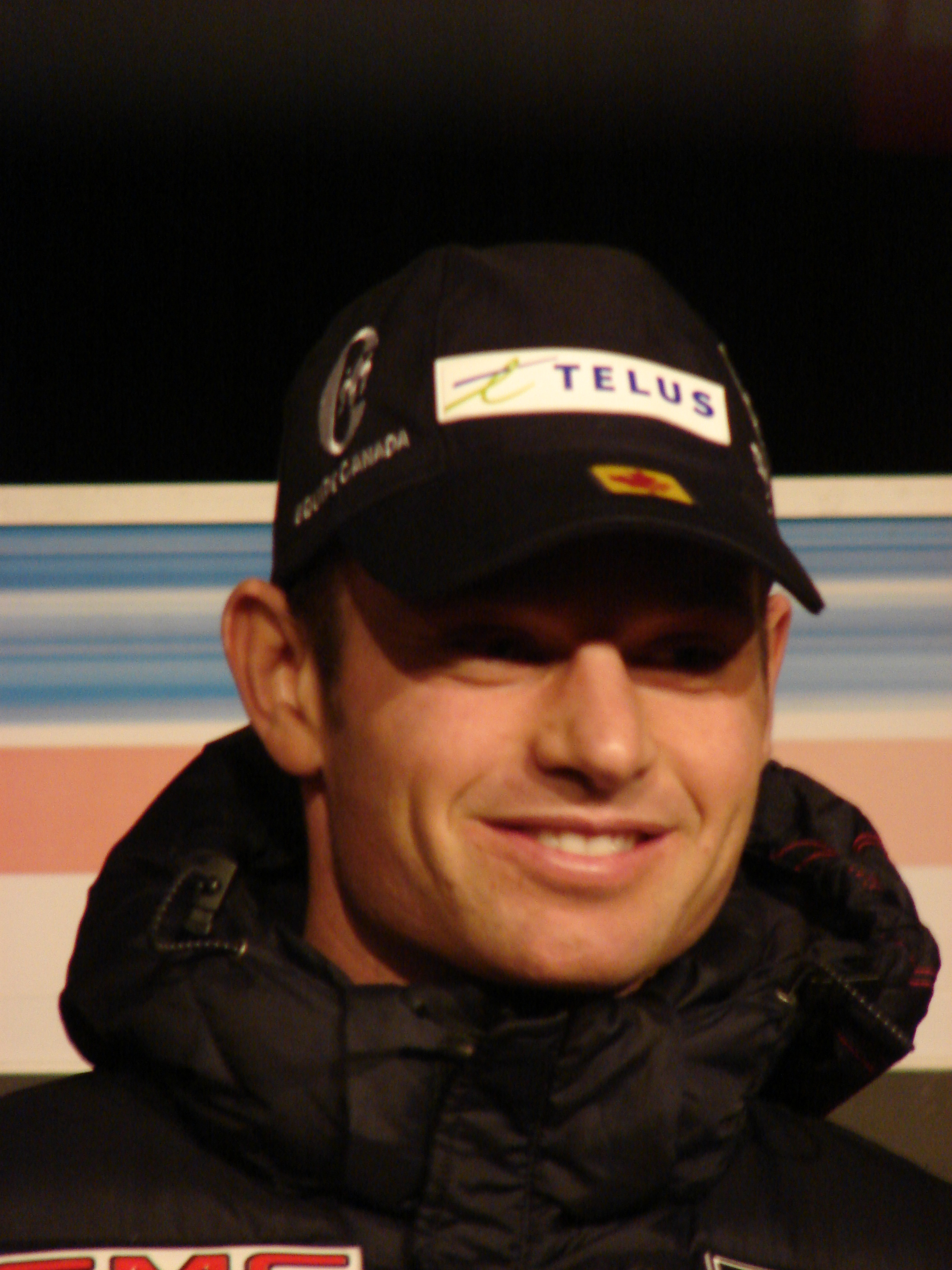

Personal information
- Born: 27 December 1972 (age 53) Bolzano, Italy
- Spouse: Sara Renner

Sport
- Country: Canada
- Sport: Alpine skiing

Thomas Grandi (born 27 December 1972 in Bolzano, Italy) is a Canadian retired alpine skier. He specialized in technical skiing giant slalom and slalom.

== Skiing career ==
Grandi started in the Alpine Skiing World Cup in the 1992-93 season. His first top ten finish in the World Cup came in December 1996 where he finished in 10th position in the Giant Slalom in Alta Badia, Italy. In the 1997-98 World Cup season, he had his first top three finish when he finished in third place in a Giant Slalom race in Park City.

Grandi's first wins in the World Cup both came in December 2004, when he won Giant Slaloms in Alta Badia and Flachau. The victory at Alta Badia made Grandi the first Canadian male skier to win a World Cup technical race.

He participated at the 2002 Winter Olympics, finishing 12th place in the Giant Slalom and 16th place in the slalom. He also participated in the 2006 Winter Olympics.

Following the 2006 Olympic Winter Games, Grandi posted three successive top three finishes in World Cup slalom, moving his career total to 9 World Cup podiums, ranking 3rd amongst Canadian men.

In March 2007 after a 14-year career with the Canadian ski team to spend more time with family. In July 2008, Grandi announced his return to competitive skiing as he hopes to earn a podium finish at the 2010 Winter Olympics in Vancouver. On March 16, 2009, Grandi decided his commitment to his family outweighed his desire to continue his competitive skiing career and announced his retirement once and for all.

== Personal life ==
Grandi's wife is Canadian cross-country skier Sara Renner, who captured the silver medal in Turin 2006 Olympics in the team sprint with Beckie Scott. Together they now own a popular Boutique Hotel in Canmore, Alberta, the Paintbox Lodge.

== World cup victories ==
| Date | Location | Race |
|---|---|---|
| 19 December 2004 | (Italy) Alta Badia | Giant Slalom |
| 21 December 2004 | (Austria) Flachau | Giant Slalom |
