= Kalle Palander =

Finnish alpine skier

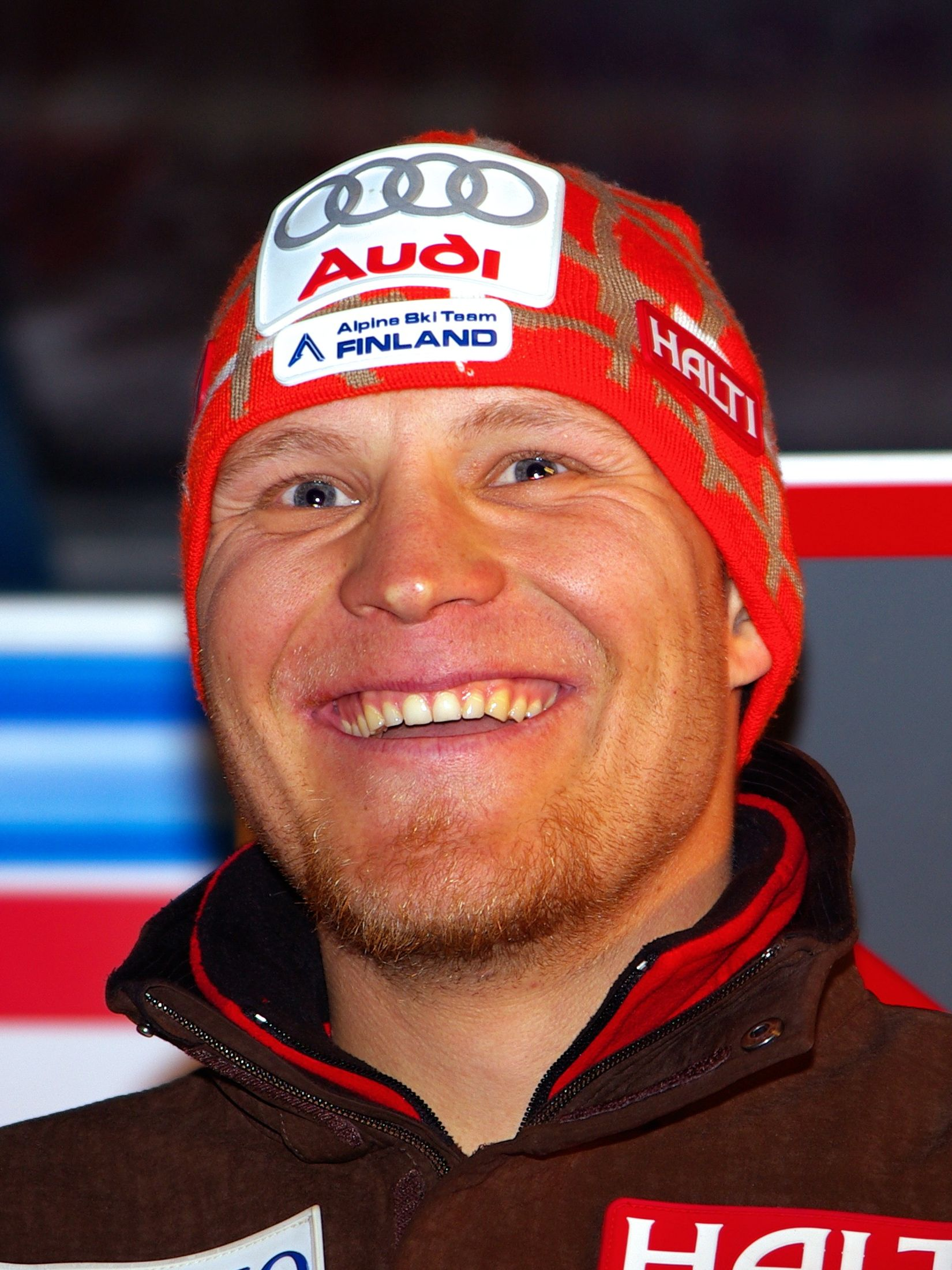

Personal information
- Born: 2 May 1977 (age 49) Tornio, Finland
- Height: 1.78 m (5 ft 10 in)
- Website: http://www.kallepalander.com

Skiing career
- Sport: Alpine skiing
- World Cup debut: December 1996

Olympics
- Teams: 3 (1998, 2002, 2006)
- Medals: 0 (0 gold)

World Championships
- Teams: 6
- Medals: 1 (1 gold)

World Cup
- Seasons: 12
- Wins: 14
- Podiums: 30
- Overall titles: 0
- Discipline titles: 1
Medal record
Men's alpine skiing
Representing Finland
World Cup race podiums
| Event | 1st | 2nd | 3rd |
|---|---|---|---|
| Slalom | 10 | 4 | 3 |
| Giant slalom | 4 | 2 | 7 |
| Total | 14 | 6 | 10 |
World Championships
| Gold medal – first place | 1999 Vail | Slalom |

Kalle Markus Palander (born 2 May 1977) is a Finnish retired alpine skier, the most successful male Finn ever in the sport.

== Career ==
In 1999 Palander won the world championship in slalom. He also won the Alpine skiing World Cup in slalom during the 2002–2003 season, and was fourth in the overall standings. Palander has also been successful in giant slalom. He is known for his relaxed attitude and for wearing a red toque instead of a helmet when participating in slalom competitions.

== World Cup victories ==
=== Overall victories ===
| Season | Discipline |
|---|---|
| 2003 | Slalom |

== World Cup victories ==
| Date | Location | Race |
|---|---|---|
| 26 January 2003 | (Austria) Kitzbühel | Slalom |
| 28 January 2003 | (Austria) Schladming | Slalom |
| 2 March 2003 | (South Korea) Yongpyong | Slalom |
| 8 March 2003 | (Japan) Shigakogen | Slalom |
| 23 November 2003 | (United States) Park City | Slalom |
| 14 December 2003 | (Italy) Alta Badia | Giant slalom |
| 4 January 2004 | (Austria) Flachau | Slalom |
| 24 January 2004 | (Austria) Kitzbühel | Slalom |
| 7 February 2004 | (Switzerland) Adelboden | Giant slalom |
| 14 March 2004 | (Italy) Sestrière | Slalom |
| 24 January 2006 | (Austria) Schladming | Slalom |
| 11 March 2006 | (Japan) Shigakogen | Slalom |
| 17 December 2006 | (Italy) Alta Badia | Giant slalom |
| 16 December 2007 | (Italy) Alta Badia | Giant slalom |

== Personal life ==
Palander has three children (born in 2007, 2012 and 2012) with Riina-Maija Palander (née Salminen), to whom he has been married since 2007. Palander also has a daughter born in Norway in 1999 to a Norwegian woman.

In 2011, Palander bought Ontika Manor in Estonia, where he occasionally resides. He has also lived in Monaco and France.
