= Stéphane Tissot =

French alpine skier (born 1979)

Stéphane Tissot (French: [stefan tiso]; born 30 May 1979 in Bonneville, Haute-Savoie) is a French former alpine skier who competed in the 2006 Winter Olympics.
