= 2001 Alpine Skiing World Cup – Men's super-G =

2001 Men's Super G World Cup
Previous: 2000	Next: 2002

Men's super G World Cup 2000/2001

== Final point standings ==
In men's super G World Cup 2000/2001 all results count.

Place	Name	Country	Total points	5 (Canada)	7 (United States)	18 (Austria)	24 (Germany)	30 (Norway)
1	Hermann Maier	Austria	420	100	40	100	80	100
2	Christoph Gruber	Austria	246	40	80	26	100	-
3	Josef Strobl	Austria	228	50	36	80	40	22
4	Stephan Eberharter	Austria	208	45	29	24	50	60
5	Werner Franz	Austria	182	32	9	60	36	45
6	Didier Cuche	Switzerland	177	36	16	26	60	29
7	Hannes Trinkl	Austria	148	18	5	45	-	80
8	Lasse Kjus	Norway	143	80	45	-	-	18
9	Fredrik Nyberg	Sweden	129	29	100	-	-	-
10	Kjetil André Aamodt	Norway	124	26	50	32	16	-
11	Marco Büchel	Liechtenstein	118	22	-	40	20	36
12	Kenneth Sivertsen	Norway	116	-	60	18	6	32
13	Didier Défago	Switzerland	90	-	26	-	14	50
14	Hans Knauß	Austria	85	24	32	29	-	-
15	Andreas Schifferer	Austria	80	60	20	-	-	-
16	Silvano Beltrametti	Switzerland	74	16	12	22	-	24
17	Daron Rahlves	United States	70	20	-	50	-	-
18	Alessandro Fattori	Italy	64	-	6	20	29	9
19	Fritz Strobl	Austria	55	15	-	-	-	40
20	Audun Grønvold	Norway	49	-	-	4	32	13
21	Patrick Wirth	Austria	46	13	22	-	-	11
22	Stefan Stankalla	Germany	45	-	-	-	45	-
23	Jernej Koblar	Slovenia	43	-	7	10	26	-
24	Paul Accola	Switzerland	42	10	8	-	24	-
25	Steve Locher	Switzerland	41	15	11	-	-	15
26	Sébastien Fournier-Bidoz	France	40	-	-	14	-	26
27	Max Rauffer	Germany	38	-	-	-	22	16
28	Patrice Manuel	France	36	12	4	12	8	-
	Christophe Saioni	France	36	4	18	-	10	4
30	Jernej Reberšak	Slovenia	33	-	10	-	9	14
31	Bjarne Solbakken	Norway	32	-	24	-	8	-
32	Franco Cavegn	Switzerland	27	5	-	-	-	22
33	Chad Fleischer	United States	25	11	14	-	-	-
34	Bruno Kernen	Switzerland	21	7	1	-	13	-
	Bode Miller	United States	21	9	-	-	12	-
36	Erik Seletto	Italy	20	-	-	2	18	-
37	Ivan Bormolini	Italy	19	8	-	-	11	-
38	Jürgen Hasler	Liechtenstein	18	-	-	11	-	7
39	Casey Puckett	United States	17	2	-	15	-	-
40	Christian Mayer	Austria	16	-	16	-	-	-
	Pierre-Emmanuel Dalcin	France	16	-	-	16	-	-
42	Simon Bastelica	France	15	-	-	-	15	-
	Lasse Paulsen	Norway	15	-	13	-	-	2
44	Gregor Šparovec	Slovenia	13	-	-	13	-	-
45	Peter Rzehak	Austria	12	-	-	-	-	12
	Florian Eckert	Germany	12	-	2	-	-	10
	Darin McBeath	Canada	12	4	-	-	-	8
48	Frédéric Covili	France	9	-	-	9	-	-
49	Luca Cattaneo	Italy	8	-	-	8	-	-
50	Claude Crétier	France	7	7	-	-	-	-
	Peter Pen	Slovenia	7	-	-	7	-	-
	Sébastien Missillier	France	7	-	-	-	-	7
53	Markus Herrmann	Switzerland	6	-	-	6	-	-
54	Jakub Fiala	United States	5	-	-	5	-	-
	Charlie Bergendahl	Sweden	5	-	-	-	5	-
	Vincent Millet	France	5	-	-	-	-	5
57	Stephan Görgl	Austria	4	-	-	-	4	-
	Kurt Sulzenbacher	Italy	4	-	-	1	3	-
59	Lorenzo Galli	Italy	3	-	3	-	-	-
	Thomas Vonn	United States	3	-	-	3	-	-
	Matteo Berbenni	Italy	3	-	-	-	-	3
62	Nicolas Burtin	France	2	-	-	-	2	-
63	Ožbi Ošlak	Slovenia	1	1	-	-	-	-
	Mike Giannelli	Canada	1	-	-	-	1	-
	Rolf von Weissenfluh	Switzerland	1	-	-	-	-	1

Alpine skiing World Cup
Men

Overall | Downhill | Super G | Giant slalom | Slalom | Combined

2001
