= 2000 Alpine Skiing World Cup – Men's super-G =

2000 Men's Super G World Cup
Previous: 1999	Next: 2001

Men's super G World Cup 1999/2000

== Final point standings ==
In men's super G World Cup 1999/2000 all results count. Hermann Maier won his third Super G World Cup in a row. Austrian athletes won six races out of seven.

Place	Name	Country	Total points	6 (United States)	7 (Canada)	19 (Austria)	26 (Austria)	27 (Austria)	33 (Norway)	38 (Italy)
1	Hermann Maier	Austria	540	100	100	100	-	60	80	100
2	Werner Franz	Austria	371	32	29	80	50	100	20	60
3	Fritz Strobl	Austria	354	15	45	24	40	100	50	80
4	Josef Strobl	Austria	305	26	60	50	100	24	29	16
5	Andreas Schifferer	Austria	294	50	36	24	24	40	60	60
6	Fredrik Nyberg	Sweden	272	36	80	13	45	50	3	45
7	Stephan Eberharter	Austria	246	80	50	-	60	32	-	24
8	Kristian Ghedina	Italy	216	-	40	32	15	9	100	20
9	Didier Cuche	Switzerland	214	22	7	60	80	45	-	-
10	Daron Rahlves	United States	183	18	32	26	-	22	45	40
11	Christian Mayer	Austria	162	45	-	29	36	-	26	26
12	Hans Knauß	Austria	159	40	26	12	20	-	32	29
13	Kjetil André Aamodt	Norway	158	6	14	40	22	36	40	-
14	Marco Büchel	Liechtenstein	125	13	-	50	-	29	9	24
15	Paul Accola	Switzerland	115	29	15	6	29	20	16	-
16	Didier Défago	Switzerland	102	10	24	36	32	-	-	-
	Steve Locher	Switzerland	102	12	20	16	18	-	36	-
18	Sébastien Fournier-Bidoz	France	94	-	16	18	10	26	24	-
19	Peter Runggaldier	Italy	93	5	11	11	16	-	18	32
20	Christophe Saioni	France	77	-	18	10	12	13	6	18
21	Rainer Salzgeber	Austria	75	20	12	-	26	12	5	-
22	Lasse Kjus	Norway	60	60	-	-	-	-	-	-
23	Patrick Wirth	Austria	56	24	22	-	-	10	-	-
24	Alessandro Fattori	Italy	55	11	3	-	11	15	15	-
25	Christian Greber	Austria	45	15	-	20	-	-	10	-
26	Patrik Järbyn	Sweden	42	16	-	5	5	16	-	-
27	Jernej Koblar	Slovenia	39	-	10	7	6	14	2	-
28	Jürg Grünenfelder	Switzerland	38	-	2	1	13	-	22	-
29	Hannes Trinkl	Austria	36	-	-	-	-	-	-	36
30	Luca Cattaneo	Italy	34	-	13	3	2	4	12	-
31	Bruno Kernen	Switzerland	32	7	-	9	-	3	13	-
32	Bjarne Solbakken	Norway	27	9	-	-	-	18	-	-
33	Casey Puckett	United States	25	-	6	8	3	-	8	-
34	Patrice Manuel	France	23	3	-	-	8	12	-	-
35	Kenneth Sivertsen	Norway	18	-	4	14	-	-	-	-
	Ivan Bormolini	Italy	18	-	-	15	-	3	-	-
37	Claude Crétier	France	15	-	-	-	7	-	8	-
38	Vincent Millet	France	14	-	-	-	14	-	-	-
	Stefan Stankalla	Germany	14	-	-	-	9	5	-	-
	Lorenzo Galli	Italy	14	-	-	-	-	-	14	-
41	Jürgen Hasler	Liechtenstein	11	-	-	-	-	-	11	-
42	Pierre-Emmanuel Dalcin	France	10	2	-	-	-	8	-	-
43	Christoph Gruber	Austria	9	-	9	-	-	-	-	-
44	Bode Miller	United States	8	8	-	-	-	-	-	-
	Kurt Sulzenbacher	Italy	8	-	8	-	-	-	-	-
46	Konrad Hari	Switzerland	7	-	-	-	-	7	-	-
47	Max Rauffer	Germany	6	-	-	-	-	6	-	-
48	Darin McBeath	Canada	5	-	5	-	-	-	-	-
	Chad Fleischer	United States	5	4	1	-	-	-	-	-
	Ed Podivinsky	Canada	5	1	-	-	4	-	-	-
	Lasse Paulsen	Norway	5	-	-	4	-	-	1	-
52	Jakub Fiala	United States	4	-	-	2	2	-	-	-
	Roland Fischnaller	Italy	4	-	-	-	-	-	4	-
54	Gregor Šparovec	Slovenia	1	-	-	-	-	1	-	-
	Jernej Reberšak	Slovenia	1	-	-	-	-	-	1	-

Alpine skiing World Cup
Men

Overall | Downhill | Super G | Giant slalom | Slalom | Combined

2000
