= 2001 Alpine Skiing World Cup – Men's downhill =

2001 Men's downhill World Cup
Previous: 2000	Next: 2002

Men's downhill World Cup 2000/2001

== Final point standings ==
In men's downhill World Cup 2000/2001 all results count.

Place	Name	Country	Total points	4 (Canada)	6 (United States)	8 (France)	11 (France)	19 (Austria)	23 (Germany)	28 (Norway)	29 (Norway)	31 (Sweden)
1	Hermann Maier	Austria	576	16	100	100	15	100	-	100	45	100
2	Stephan Eberharter	Austria	562	100	60	80	-	60	50	32	100	80
3	Fritz Strobl	Austria	402	26	45	60	-	32	100	50	60	29
4	Hannes Trinkl	Austria	313	-	50	29	20	80	40	18	40	36
5	Lasse Kjus	Norway	301	60	80	-	-	45	-	60	24	32
6	Franco Cavegn	Switzerland	290	9	33	29	36	16	60	40	50	50
7	Silvano Beltrametti	Switzerland	266	80	13	7	32	26	12	40	16	40
8	Werner Franz	Austria	236	12	24	11	45	36	22	24	36	26
9	Peter Rzehak	Austria	213	-	36	18	7	24	80	15	9	24
10	Josef Strobl	Austria	196	50	32	-	15	-	20	29	5	45
11	Florian Eckert	Germany	190	-	4	13	-	-	13	80	80	-
12	Bruno Kernen	Switzerland	183	13	40	16	50	10	26	-	8	20
13	Didier Cuche	Switzerland	181	29	12	45	-	18	45	22	10	-
14	Alessandro Fattori	Italy	177	6	9	11	100	13	32	-	6	-
15	Daron Rahlves	United States	149	10	15	16	3	60	16	-	29	-
16	Kenneth Sivertsen	Norway	138	14	22	-	1	12	-	14	15	60
17	Didier Défago	Switzerland	123	24	-	1	6	14	1	45	32	-
18	Chad Fleischer	United States	120	45	20	11	-	22	-	-	-	22
19	Roland Fischnaller	Italy	111	-	-	-	60	12	11	6	22	-
20	Andreas Schifferer	Austria	108	40	18	50	-	-	-	-	-	-
21	Hans Knauß	Austria	95	36	11	40	8	-	-	-	-	-
	Kristian Ghedina	Italy	95	-	-	-	80	-	15	-	-	-
23	Rolf von Weissenfluh	Switzerland	94	-	4	32	-	6	-	16	20	16
24	Pierre-Emmanuel Dalcin	France	90	22	-	16	-	-	18	2	14	18
25	Peter Pen	Slovenia	86	-	-	3	40	2	2	26	13	-
26	Claude Crétier	France	64	11	7	24	22	-	-	-	-	-
	Paul Accola	Switzerland	64	15	29	-	10	-	-	10	-	-
28	Christian Greber	Austria	63	-	-	-	-	40	-	12	11	-
29	Christoph Gruber	Austria	58	8	-	36	4	3	7	-	-	-
30	Max Rauffer	Germany	56	32	-	-	-	-	24	-	-	-
31	Kurt Sulzenbacher	Italy	54	-	-	-	13	5	36	-	-	-
32	Luca Cattaneo	Italy	53	4	11	-	24	-	14	-	-	-
33	Patrick Wirth	Austria	50	-	-	12	29	-	9	-	-	-
34	Nicolas Burtin	France	48	-	-	20	-	-	-	20	8	-
35	Fredrik Nyberg	Sweden	46	20	26	-	-	-	-	-	-	-
36	Kjetil André Aamodt	Norway	43	1	14	-	9	15	-	4	-	-
37	Darin McBeath	Canada	42	-	16	6	-	20	-	-	-	-
38	Stefan Stankalla	Germany	39	-	6	4	-	-	29	-	-	-
	Steve Locher	Switzerland	39	-	-	-	2	-	-	11	26	-
40	Luke Sauder	Canada	34	-	-	-	26	8	-	-	-	-
41	Lorenzo Galli	Italy	33	-	-	8	16	9	-	-	-	-
42	Michael Walchhofer	Austria	29	-	-	-	-	29	-	-	-	-
	Erik Seletto	Italy	29	-	-	-	18	-	11	-	-	-
44	Kevin Wert	Canada	28	-	-	22	-	-	6	-	-	-
45	Markus Herrmann	Switzerland	27	-	-	-	12	-	-	13	2	-
46	Marco Büchel	Liechtenstein	24	5	8	-	-	7	-	4	-	-
47	Antoine Dénériaz	France	22	-	-	-	-	-	-	10	12	-
	Marc Bottollier	France	22	-	-	-	11	-	-	7	4	-
49	Audun Grønvold	Norway	18	18	-	-	-	-	-	-	-	-
	Sébastien Fournier-Bidoz	France	18	-	-	-	-	-	-	-	18	-
	Jürgen Hasler	Liechtenstein	18	-	-	5	-	4	5	1	3	-
52	Chris Puckett	United States	14	8	6	-	-	-	-	-	-	-
53	Ed Podivinsky	Canada	11	3	-	-	-	-	8	-	-	-
54	Matteo Berbenni	Italy	10	-	-	-	-	-	-	8	2	-
55	Bode Miller	United States	6	-	-	-	5	1	-	-	-	-
56	Åne Sæter	Norway	5	-	-	-	-	-	-	5	-	-
57	Christophe Saioni	France	4	-	-	-	-	-	4	-	-	-
58	Ivan Bormolini	Italy	3	3	-	-	-	-	-	-	-	-
	Ambrosi Hoffmann	Switzerland	3	-	-	-	-	-	3	-	-	-
60	Brett Fischer	United States	2	-	2	-	-	-	-	-	-	-
	Vincent Blanc	France	2	-	-	2	-	-	-	-	-	-
62	AJ Bear	Australia	1	-	1	-	-	-	-	-	-	-

Alpine Skiing World Cup
Men

Overall | Downhill | Super G | Giant slalom | Slalom | Combined

2001
