= 2002 Alpine Skiing World Cup – Men's downhill =

2002 Men's downhill World Cup
Previous: 2001	Next: 2003

Men's downhill World Cup 2001/2002

== Final point standings ==
In men's downhill World Cup 2001/02 all results count.

Place	Name	Country	Total points	5 (France)	8 (Italy)	9 (Italy)	14 (Italy)	15 (Italy)	18 (Switzerland)	22 (Austria)	28 (Switzerland)	30 (Norway)	32 (Austria)
1	Stephan Eberharter	Austria	810	100	50	100	60	60	100	100	100	40	100
2	Fritz Strobl	Austria	520	24	24	32	80	100	40	45	80	45	50
3	Kristian Ghedina	Italy	381	15	100	50	45	18	-	24	40	60	29
4	Franco Cavegn	Switzerland	366	45	36	45	50	45	22	10	29	60	24
5	Hannes Trinkl	Austria	350	-	-	-	-	-	80	60	50	100	60
6	Kjetil André Aamodt	Norway	337	18	40	60	32	22	50	80	-	9	26
7	Christian Greber	Austria	329	29	26	36	100	36	18	-	20	24	40
8	Kurt Sulzenbacher	Italy	320	80	60	-	20	32	24	50	-	18	36
9	Michael Walchhofer	Austria	295	60	15	80	-	-	-	26	60	32	22
10	Ambrosi Hoffmann	Switzerland	273	50	8	20	29	8	20	22	20	16	80
11	Peter Rzehak	Austria	248	-	45	26	18	24	45	40	15	3	32
12	Josef Strobl	Austria	238	32	16	26	24	80	60	-	-	-	-
13	Bruno Kernen	Switzerland	219	9	20	13	36	40	18	15	16	36	16
14	Didier Cuche	Switzerland	218	40	32	22	9	14	9	40	-	32	20
15	Lasse Kjus	Norway	215	5	80	40	-	-	26	11	-	8	45
16	Klaus Kröll	Austria	205	36	9	14	-	50	14	32	45	5	-
17	Claude Crétier	France	168	-	-	-	7	15	32	8	26	80	-
18	Antoine Dénériaz	France	157	11	29	18	22	29	8	1	13	26	-
19	Daron Rahlves	United States	113	-	-	12	40	20	29	-	-	12	-
20	Pierre-Emmanuel Dalcin	France	108	12	4	16	14	1	18	29	14	-	-
21	Rolf von Weissenfluh	Switzerland	91	14	18	16	8	-	2	20	-	13	-
22	Roland Fischnaller	Italy	85	8	6	7	29	-	3	-	22	10	-
23	Christoph Gruber	Austria	82	-	5	11	-	-	12	-	36	-	18
24	Kenneth Sivertsen	Norway	79	-	22	29	3	-	-	-	13	12	-
25	Luca Cattaneo	Italy	72	7	3	-	4	10	5	5	24	14	-
26	Hans Knauß	Austria	71	-	-	-	-	16	11	12	32	-	-
27	Alessandro Fattori	Italy	66	-	12	5	13	11	4	16	5	-	-
28	Andreas Schifferer	Austria	57	-	7	2	5	-	36	-	-	7	-
29	Sébastien Fournier-Bidoz	France	51	22	2	10	12	2	-	-	3	-	-
30	Patrik Järbyn	Sweden	47	1	-	-	1	5	13	18	9	-	-
31	Gregor Šparovec	Slovenia	44	-	-	-	16	12	-	-	-	16	-
32	Chad Fleischer	United States	41	-	-	-	15	26	-	-	-	-	-
	Audun Grønvold	Norway	41	16	1	-	-	4	7	13	-	-	-
34	Didier Défago	Switzerland	36	26	10	-	-	-	-	-	-	-	-
	Marc Bottollier	France	36	20	-	-	-	9	1	6	-	-	-
	Markus Herrmann	Switzerland	36	-	-	6	10	-	-	-	-	20	-
37	Peter Pen	Slovenia	31	13	14	4	-	-	-	-	-	-	-
38	Erik Seletto	Italy	27	-	-	-	-	13	7	-	7	-	-
39	Paul Accola	Switzerland	25	-	-	-	-	-	-	14	11	-	-
40	Max Rauffer	Germany	23	-	-	1	-	-	-	-	-	22	-
41	Bjarne Solbakken	Norway	22	3	-	-	-	-	-	7	8	4	-
42	Fredrik Nyberg	Sweden	21	-	-	-	11	6	-	4	-	-	-
43	Norbert Holzknecht	Austria	20	-	11	9	-	-	-	-	-	-	-
44	Claudio Collenberg	Switzerland	13	-	13	-	-	-	-	-	-	-	-
	Steve Locher	Switzerland	13	-	-	-	-	-	10	-	-	3	-
46	Ed Podivinsky	Canada	12	-	-	3	2	7	-	-	-	-	-
	Darin McBeath	Canada	12	-	-	9	-	-	-	3	-	-	-
	Matteo Berbenni	Italy	12	-	-	-	6	-	-	-	-	6	-
49	Nicolas Burtin	France	10	10	-	-	-	-	-	-	-	-	-
	Lorenzo Galli	Italy	10	-	-	-	1	-	-	9	-	-	-
	Primož Skerbinek	Slovenia	10	-	-	-	-	-	-	-	10	-	-
52	Scott Macartney	United States	7	-	-	-	-	-	-	-	7	-	-
53	Finlay Mickel	United Kingdom	6	6	-	-	-	-	-	-	-	-	-
	Jakub Fiala	United States	6	3	-	-	-	-	-	2	1	-	-
55	Marco Sullivan	United States	4	4	-	-	-	-	-	-	-	-	-
	Patrick Staudacher	Italy	4	-	-	-	-	-	-	-	4	-	-
57	Stefan Stankalla	Germany	3	-	-	-	-	3	-	-	-	-	-
	Yannick Bertrand	France	3	-	-	-	-	-	-	-	-	3	-
59	Daniel Züger	Switzerland	2	-	-	-	-	-	-	-	2	-	-

Alpine Skiing World Cup
Men

Overall | Downhill | Super G | Giant slalom | Slalom | Combined

2002
