= 2000 Alpine Skiing World Cup – Men's downhill =

2000 Men's downhill World Cup
Previous: 1999	Next: 2001

Men's downhill World Cup 1999/2000

== Final point standings ==
In men's downhill World Cup 1999/2000 all results count.

Place	Name	Country	Total points	4 (United States)	6 (Canada)	9 (Italy)	10 (Italy)	14 (France)	17 (Switzerland)	20 (Austria)	23 (Germany)	31 (Norway)	32 (Norway)	37 (Italy)
1	Hermann Maier	Austria	800	100	80	40	60	100	80	50	100	60	50	80
2	Kristian Ghedina	Italy	677	60	32	100	80	50	50	80	45	80	80	20
3	Josef Strobl	Austria	533	7	50	80	50	45	100	80	50	13	22	36
4	Hannes Trinkl	Austria	507	-	100	20	11	60	45	45	60	26	40	100
5	Stephan Eberharter	Austria	454	80	60	45	15	80	36	26	40	36	36	-
6	Fritz Strobl	Austria	453	14	26	50	40	29	45	100	36	50	13	50
7	Andreas Schifferer	Austria	354	32	45	26	100	36	16	40	32	18	9	-
8	Werner Franz	Austria	317	40	3	32	32	24	26	29	45	32	14	40
9	Ed Podivinsky	Canada	298	20	22	60	26	11	60	16	16	2	20	45
10	Daron Rahlves	United States	273	-	16	3	-	3	9	5	8	100	100	29
11	Didier Cuche	Switzerland	270	16	24	16	1	20	32	14	-	80	45	22
12	Hans Knauß	Austria	238	50	29	9	20	40	14	20	26	-	12	18
13	Kjetil André Aamodt	Norway	225	15	2	36	45	26	22	36	22	6	15	-
14	Bruno Kernen	Switzerland	167	24	40	-	16	18	32	24	-	5	8	-
15	Christian Greber	Austria	162	45	-	-	8	16	-	8	13	11	1	60
16	Peter Runggaldier	Italy	156	14	14	11	7	12	20	4	18	32	24	-
17	Patrik Järbyn	Sweden	141	-	20	-	22	6	-	22	24	4	11	32
18	Kenneth Sivertsen	Norway	137	6	7	24	26	32	10	-	32	-	-	-
19	Alessandro Fattori	Italy	129	2	11	4	14	10	24	-	10	14	16	24
20	Luca Cattaneo	Italy	118	11	-	5	18	13	15	15	15	26	-	-
	Jürg Grünenfelder	Switzerland	118	-	4	-	12	6	13	-	11	40	32	-
22	Max Rauffer	Germany	115	3	-	13	-	-	-	-	1	12	60	26
23	Kurt Sulzenbacher	Italy	102	5	5	14	-	-	18	-	14	20	26	-
24	Fredrik Nyberg	Sweden	101	18	-	-	-	-	-	-	22	16	29	16
25	Darin McBeath	Canada	99	24	6	29	6	7	-	14	6	-	7	-
26	Paul Accola	Switzerland	92	26	15	-	-	16	-	3	-	22	10	-
27	Claude Crétier	France	88	-	-	1	36	14	8	1	9	15	4	-
28	Luke Sauder	Canada	69	4	1	15	5	-	11	11	12	10	-	-
29	Roland Assinger	Austria	58	-	-	22	4	-	-	32	-	-	-	-
30	Kevin Wert	Canada	49	-	18	12	-	-	7	6	5	1	-	-
31	Chad Fleischer	United States	46	10	36	-	-	-	-	-	-	-	-	-
32	Pierre-Emmanuel Dalcin	France	41	2	-	-	-	-	5	18	7	7	2	-
33	Lasse Kjus	Norway	36	36	-	-	-	-	-	-	-	-	-	-
34	Silvano Beltrametti	Switzerland	35	29	-	6	-	-	-	-	-	-	-	-
	Antoine Dénériaz	France	35	12	-	7	3	9	4	-	-	-	-	-
36	Audun Grønvold	Norway	33	-	-	-	29	-	-	-	4	-	-	-
	Erik Seletto	Italy	33	-	-	-	13	4	6	-	-	10	-	-
38	Chris Puckett	United States	32	-	12	3	-	-	-	11	-	-	6	-
39	Didier Défago	Switzerland	28	-	10	-	-	-	-	-	-	-	18	-
40	Rolf von Weissenfluh	Switzerland	27	-	-	18	9	-	-	-	-	-	-	-
41	Steve Locher	Switzerland	26	9	9	-	-	-	-	-	2	1	5	-
42	Peter Rzehak	Austria	22	-	-	-	-	22	-	-	-	-	-	-
43	Lorenzo Galli	Italy	19	-	-	-	-	-	12	7	-	-	-	-
44	Vincent Blanc	France	17	-	-	-	-	-	3	14	-	-	-	-
45	Christian Mayer	Austria	16	-	-	-	-	-	-	-	-	-	-	16
46	Stefan Stankalla	Germany	13	-	13	-	-	-	-	-	-	-	-	-
47	Lasse Paulsen	Norway	12	-	-	-	-	9	-	-	-	3	-	-
48	Jeff Durand	Canada	11	-	-	-	10	-	-	1	-	-	-	-
49	Claudio Collenberg	Switzerland	10	-	-	10	-	-	-	-	-	-	-	-
	Ivan Bormolini	Italy	10	-	8	-	-	-	-	2	-	-	-	-
51	David Pretot	France	9	-	-	9	-	-	-	-	-	-	-	-
	Marco Büchel	Liechtenstein	9	-	-	-	-	-	-	9	-	-	-	-
	Roland Fischnaller	Italy	9	-	-	-	-	-	1	-	-	8	-	-
54	Nicolas Burtin	France	8	8	-	-	-	-	-	-	-	-	-	-
55	Andreas Buder	Austria	3	-	-	-	-	3	-	-	-	-	-	-
	Peter Pen	Slovenia	3	-	-	-	-	-	3	-	-	-	-	-
	Florian Eckert	Germany	3	-	-	-	-	-	-	-	3	-	-	-
	Bjarne Solbakken	Norway	3	-	-	-	-	-	-	-	-	-	3	-
59	Ludwig Sprenger	Italy	2	-	-	-	2	-	-	-	-	-	-	-
60	Klaus Kröll	Austria	1	-	-	-	-	1	-	-	-	-	-	-

Alpine Skiing World Cup
Men

Overall | Downhill | Super G | Giant slalom | Slalom | Combined

2000
