= 2003 Alpine Skiing World Cup – Men's downhill =

2003 Men's downhill World Cup
| Previous: 2002 | Next: 2004 |

Men's downhill World Cup 2002/2003

== Final point standings ==
In men's downhill World Cup 2002/2003 all results count.

| Place | Name | Country | Total points | 4 (Canada) | 6 (United States) | 8 (France) | 12 (Italy) | 14 (Italy) | 17 (Italy) | 20 (Switzerland) | 21 (Switzerland) | 24 (Austria) | 29 (Germany) | 34 (Norway) |
|---|---|---|---|---|---|---|---|---|---|---|---|---|---|---|
| 1 | Stephan Eberharter | Austria | 790 | 100 | 100 | 100 | - | - | 100 | 100 | 60 | 50 | 100 | 80 |
| 2 | Daron Rahlves | United States | 593 | 7 | 60 | 10 | 24 | 100 | 60 | 80 | 32 | 100 | 60 | 60 |
| 3 | Michael Walchhofer | Austria | 430 | 40 | 80 | 8 | 80 | 29 | 80 | - | 80 | 9 | - | 24 |
| 4 | Bruno Kernen | Switzerland | 351 | 5 | 15 | 32 | 20 | - | 36 | 60 | 100 | 14 | 29 | 40 |
| 5 | Hannes Trinkl | Austria | 341 | 80 | 26 | 26 | 40 | 60 | 26 | 24 | 14 | 45 | - | - |
| 6 | Antoine Dénériaz | France | 337 | 11 | - | 50 | 100 | - | 18 | - | 40 | 18 | - | 100 |
| 7 | Fritz Strobl | Austria | 334 | 45 | 50 | 11 | 50 | 80 | 14 | - | 26 | 26 | 32 | - |
| | Kjetil André Aamodt | Norway | 334 | 60 | 36 | 45 | 14 | - | - | 32 | 29 | 60 | 13 | 45 |
| 9 | Didier Cuche | Switzerland | 333 | 9 | 45 | - | 11 | 22 | 45 | 14 | 5 | 80 | 80 | 22 |
| 10 | Klaus Kröll | Austria | 317 | 22 | 22 | 80 | 32 | 32 | 50 | 26 | - | 24 | - | 29 |
| 11 | Andreas Schifferer | Austria | 290 | 16 | - | 60 | 22 | 26 | 24 | 50 | 45 | 11 | 36 | - |
| 12 | Ambrosi Hoffmann | Switzerland | 288 | 12 | 29 | 20 | 15 | 24 | 40 | 36 | 50 | 40 | 22 | - |
| 13 | Bode Miller | United States | 268 | 36 | 32 | 12 | 12 | 45 | 32 | 40 | 24 | 32 | 3 | - |
| 14 | Peter Rzehak | Austria | 261 | 32 | 12 | 14 | 10 | 50 | 29 | 16 | 10 | 20 | 50 | 18 |
| 15 | Josef Strobl | Austria | 246 | 50 | - | 15 | 60 | 36 | 13 | 14 | - | 9 | 29 | 20 |
| 16 | Franco Cavegn | Switzerland | 225 | 13 | 16 | 24 | 26 | 40 | 22 | 20 | 11 | 3 | 18 | 32 |
| 17 | Werner Franz | Austria | 212 | 26 | 13 | 36 | 45 | 20 | 20 | 8 | 15 | 18 | 11 | - |
| 18 | Didier Défago | Switzerland | 159 | 29 | 24 | 40 | - | 16 | - | - | 12 | 22 | 16 | - |
| 19 | Nicolas Burtin | France | 143 | - | 5 | 13 | 36 | 2 | 7 | - | 3 | 12 | 15 | 50 |
| 20 | Marco Sullivan | United States | 102 | - | 40 | - | 18 | - | 10 | 18 | 16 | - | - | - |
| 21 | Hans Knauß | Austria | 100 | - | 4 | - | 16 | - | - | 29 | - | 15 | - | 36 |
| | Kurt Sulzenbacher | Italy | 100 | 18 | - | - | 9 | 10 | 9 | 10 | 18 | - | - | 26 |
| 23 | Sébastien Fournier-Bidoz | France | 98 | 8 | 22 | 20 | - | 6 | 12 | 3 | 7 | 3 | 1 | 16 |
| 24 | Christoph Gruber | Austria | 96 | - | - | - | - | - | - | 45 | - | 6 | 45 | - |
| 25 | Hermann Maier | Austria | 85 | - | - | - | - | - | - | 9 | 36 | 40 | - | - |
| 26 | Andreas Buder | Austria | 77 | 20 | 10 | - | 29 | 18 | - | - | - | - | - | - |
| 27 | Marco Büchel | Liechtenstein | 74 | 15 | 18 | - | - | - | - | - | - | 29 | 12 | - |
| 28 | Andrej Jerman | Slovenia | 70 | - | 15 | 2 | 7 | 14 | 4 | 6 | 13 | - | 9 | - |
| 29 | Rolf von Weissenfluh | Switzerland | 61 | - | - | - | - | 8 | - | 15 | 20 | 4 | 14 | - |
| 30 | Max Rauffer | Germany | 52 | - | - | - | 6 | 13 | - | 11 | 22 | - | - | - |
| 31 | Roland Fischnaller | Italy | 50 | 6 | - | - | 13 | - | 8 | - | - | 1 | 22 | - |
| 32 | Erik Seletto | Italy | 44 | - | - | 1 | - | 7 | 6 | 22 | 8 | - | - | - |
| 33 | Gregor Šparovec | Slovenia | 43 | - | 3 | - | - | - | - | - | - | - | 40 | - |
| 34 | Jakub Fiala | United States | 38 | - | 8 | 5 | - | - | - | 12 | - | 13 | - | - |
| 35 | Bjarne Solbakken | Norway | 36 | - | - | 29 | - | - | - | - | - | - | 7 | - |
| 36 | Kristian Ghedina | Italy | 35 | - | - | 22 | - | - | - | 4 | 9 | - | - | - |
| 37 | Pierre-Emmanuel Dalcin | France | 30 | - | 2 | 16 | - | 12 | - | - | - | - | - | - |
| | Thomas Graggaber | Austria | 30 | 24 | - | - | - | - | - | - | 6 | - | - | - |
| | Lasse Kjus | Norway | 30 | - | - | - | 8 | 15 | 2 | - | 5 | - | - | - |
| | Erik Guay | Canada | 30 | - | - | 3 | 6 | - | 11 | - | - | - | 10 | - |
| 41 | Daniel Züger | Switzerland | 28 | 3 | - | - | - | - | 16 | 5 | - | - | 4 | - |
| 42 | Claude Crétier | France | 26 | 4 | - | 7 | - | 3 | - | 7 | - | 5 | - | - |
| 43 | Jürg Grünenfelder | Switzerland | 25 | - | - | 9 | - | 9 | - | - | 1 | - | 6 | - |
| 44 | Cédric Meilleur | France | 24 | - | - | - | - | - | - | - | - | - | 24 | - |
| 45 | Audun Grønvold | Norway | 21 | - | 11 | - | - | - | - | - | - | 10 | - | - |
| | Peter Fill | Italy | 21 | - | 1 | - | - | - | 15 | - | - | - | 5 | - |
| 47 | Patrik Järbyn | Sweden | 17 | - | - | - | 2 | - | - | - | - | 7 | 8 | - |
| 48 | Kenneth Sivertsen | Norway | 15 | 14 | - | - | 1 | - | - | - | - | - | - | - |
| 49 | Peter Pen | Slovenia | 14 | - | - | - | 3 | 11 | - | - | - | - | - | - |
| 50 | Alessandro Fattori | Italy | 11 | 11 | - | - | - | - | - | - | - | - | - | - |
| | Matteo Berbenni | Italy | 11 | - | - | 7 | - | 4 | - | - | - | - | - | - |
| 52 | Luca Cattaneo | Italy | 9 | - | 9 | - | - | - | - | - | - | - | - | - |
| | Finlay Mickel | United Kingdom | 9 | - | - | 4 | - | - | 5 | - | - | - | - | - |
| 54 | AJ Bear | Australia | 8 | - | 8 | - | - | - | - | - | - | - | - | - |
| 55 | Tobias Grünenfelder | Switzerland | 7 | 1 | 6 | - | - | - | - | - | - | - | - | - |
| | Beni Hofer | Switzerland | 7 | - | - | - | - | 5 | - | - | - | - | 2 | - |
| 57 | Markus Herrmann | Switzerland | 6 | - | - | - | - | - | 3 | 1 | 2 | - | - | - |
| 58 | Aksel Lund Svindal | Norway | 4 | - | - | - | 4 | - | - | - | - | - | - | - |
| 59 | Fredrik Nyberg | Sweden | 2 | 2 | - | - | - | - | - | - | - | - | - | - |
| | Stefan Stankalla | Germany | 2 | - | - | - | - | - | - | 2 | - | - | - | - |
| 61 | Lorenzo Galli | Italy | 1 | - | - | - | - | 1 | - | - | - | - | - | - |
| | Vincent Lavoie | Canada | 1 | - | - | - | - | - | 1 | - | - | - | - | - |

Note:

In the last race only the best racers were allowed to compete and only the best 15 finishers were awarded with points.

Alpine Skiing World Cup
Men

Overall | Downhill | Super G | Giant slalom | Slalom | Combined

2003
