= 2003 Alpine Skiing World Cup – Men's super-G =

2003 Men's Super G World Cup
| Previous: 2002 | Next: 2004 |

Men's super G World Cup 2002/2003

== Final point standings ==
In men's super G World Cup 2002/03 all results count.

| Place | Name | Country | Total points | 5 (Canada) | 7 (United States) | 11 (Italy) | 27 (Austria) | 30 (Germany) | 35 (Norway) |
|---|---|---|---|---|---|---|---|---|---|
| 1 | Stephan Eberharter | Austria | 356 | 100 | 16 | - | 60 | 80 | 100 |
| 2 | Marco Büchel | Liechtenstein | 280 | 40 | 80 | 60 | - | 100 | - |
| 3 | Didier Cuche | Switzerland | 270 | 60 | 100 | 20 | 40 | 18 | 32 |
| 4 | Kjetil André Aamodt | Norway | 251 | 50 | 36 | 50 | 29 | 36 | 50 |
| 5 | Hannes Reichelt | Austria | 194 | - | - | 80 | 32 | 22 | 60 |
| 6 | Christoph Gruber | Austria | 185 | 5 | 9 | 29 | 80 | 40 | 22 |
| 7 | Didier Défago | Switzerland | 180 | 16 | 50 | 100 | 3 | 11 | - |
| 8 | Andreas Schifferer | Austria | 165 | 45 | 22 | 32 | 50 | 16 | - |
| 9 | Hannes Trinkl | Austria | 155 | 24 | 60 | - | 26 | - | 45 |
| 10 | Josef Strobl | Austria | 150 | 80 | - | 24 | 18 | 12 | 16 |
| 11 | Lasse Kjus | Norway | 140 | 20 | 14 | 26 | - | - | 80 |
| 12 | Bode Miller | United States | 138 | 36 | 40 | 40 | 22 | - | - |
| | Bruno Kernen | Switzerland | 138 | 10 | - | 45 | 14 | 29 | 40 |
| 14 | Hans Knauß | Austria | 131 | - | 29 | 18 | 45 | 10 | 29 |
| 15 | Ambrosi Hoffmann | Switzerland | 127 | 15 | 45 | - | 24 | 7 | 36 |
| 16 | Fritz Strobl | Austria | 124 | 26 | - | 12 | 36 | 50 | - |
| 17 | Tobias Grünenfelder | Switzerland | 107 | 13 | 26 | - | 8 | 60 | - |
| 18 | Franco Cavegn | Switzerland | 102 | 32 | 18 | 1 | 5 | 20 | 26 |
| 19 | Hermann Maier | Austria | 100 | - | - | - | 100 | - | - |
| 20 | Pierre-Emmanuel Dalcin | France | 74 | 29 | - | - | - | 45 | - |
| 21 | Werner Franz | Austria | 61 | 11 | 6 | 8 | 7 | 9 | 20 |
| 22 | Bjarne Solbakken | Norway | 57 | 8 | 32 | - | 12 | 5 | - |
| 23 | Aksel Lund Svindal | Norway | 54 | - | - | 40 | 13 | 1 | - |
| 24 | Daron Rahlves | United States | 45 | - | - | 4 | 9 | 32 | - |
| 25 | Stefan Stankalla | Germany | 39 | - | - | 15 | 15 | 9 | - |
| 26 | Marco Sullivan | United States | 34 | 18 | - | 16 | - | - | - |
| | Fredrik Nyberg | Sweden | 34 | - | 24 | - | 10 | - | - |
| | Patrik Järbyn | Sweden | 34 | - | 13 | - | 6 | 15 | - |
| 29 | Sébastien Fournier-Bidoz | France | 33 | - | 7 | - | - | 26 | - |
| | Gregor Šparovec | Slovenia | 33 | 3 | - | 13 | 11 | 6 | - |
| 31 | Jakub Fiala | United States | 32 | - | 5 | 11 | 16 | - | - |
| 32 | Erik Guay | Canada | 30 | - | - | 4 | - | 26 | - |
| 33 | Claude Crétier | France | 27 | - | - | 5 | 22 | - | - |
| 34 | Peter Fill | Italy | 26 | 1 | 11 | - | - | 14 | - |
| 35 | Kenneth Sivertsen | Norway | 25 | 9 | 16 | - | - | - | - |
| | Andrej Jerman | Slovenia | 25 | - | 3 | 22 | - | - | - |
| 37 | Benjamin Raich | Austria | 24 | - | - | - | - | - | 24 |
| 38 | Alessandro Fattori | Italy | 22 | 22 | - | - | - | - | - |
| 39 | Thomas Vonn | United States | 20 | - | 20 | - | - | - | - |
| | Michael Gufler | Italy | 20 | 15 | - | - | 5 | - | - |
| 41 | Michael Walchhofer | Austria | 18 | - | - | - | - | - | 18 |
| 42 | Arnold Rieder | Italy | 14 | - | - | 14 | - | - | - |
| | Giorgio Gros | Italy | 14 | - | - | 10 | - | 4 | - |
| 44 | Marc Bottollier-Lasquin | France | 13 | 13 | - | - | - | - | - |
| | Jan Hudec | Canada | 13 | - | - | - | - | 13 | - |
| 46 | Christophe Saioni | France | 12 | - | 12 | - | - | - | - |
| 47 | Jernej Koblar | Slovenia | 10 | - | 10 | - | - | - | - |
| | AJ Bear | Australia | 10 | - | - | 10 | - | - | - |
| 49 | Erik Schlopy | United States | 9 | - | 9 | - | - | - | - |
| 50 | Klaus Kröll | Austria | 8 | - | - | 6 | - | 2 | - |
| 51 | Stephan Görgl | Austria | 7 | 7 | - | - | - | - | - |
| | Antoine Dénériaz | France | 7 | - | - | 7 | - | - | - |
| 53 | Patrick Staudacher | Italy | 6 | 6 | - | - | - | - | - |
| | Roland Fischnaller | Italy | 6 | 4 | - | 2 | - | - | - |
| 55 | Audun Grønvold | Norway | 4 | - | 4 | - | - | - | - |
| | Konrad Hari | Switzerland | 4 | - | 1 | - | 3 | - | - |
| 57 | Kristian Ghedina | Italy | 3 | - | - | - | - | 3 | - |
| 58 | Lasse Paulsen | Norway | 2 | 2 | - | - | - | - | - |
| | Max Rauffer | Germany | 2 | - | 2 | - | - | - | - |
| 60 | Beni Hofer | Switzerland | 1 | - | - | - | 1 | - | - |

Note:

In the last race only the best racers were allowed to compete and only the best 15 finishers were awarded with points.

Alpine skiing World Cup
Men

Overall | Downhill | Super G | Giant slalom | Slalom | Combined

2003
