= 2002 Alpine Skiing World Cup – Men's super-G =

2002 Men's Super G World Cup
Previous: 2001	Next: 2003

Men's super G World Cup 2001/2002

== Final point standings ==
In men's super G World Cup 2001/02 all results count.

Place	Name	Country	Total points	4 (France)	21 (Austria)	26 (Germany)	27 (Germany)	31 (Norway)	33 (Austria)
1	Stephan Eberharter	Austria	470	100	100	60	100	60	50
2	Didier Cuche	Switzerland	426	80	60	80	80	26	100
3	Fritz Strobl	Austria	326	45	22	100	50	29	80
4	Alessandro Fattori	Italy	294	15	80	7	32	100	60
5	Andreas Schifferer	Austria	214	14	24	50	60	40	26
6	Kjetil André Aamodt	Norway	210	12	32	40	45	45	36
7	Didier Défago	Switzerland	202	29	-	45	8	80	40
8	Christoph Gruber	Austria	193	50	40	26	29	16	32
9	Lasse Kjus	Norway	176	20	45	15	36	40	20
10	Frederik Nyberg	Sweden	158	36	36	36	40	10	-
11	Hans Knauß	Austria	156	-	29	32	26	24	45
12	Daron Rahlves	United States	118	7	50	29	24	8	-
13	Pierre-Emmanuel Dalcin	France	100	40	16	22	22	-	-
14	Paul Accola	Switzerland	91	24	18	8	18	5	18
15	Kristian Ghedina	Italy	88	10	14	13	1	50	-
16	Stephan Görgl	Austria	81	26	9	18	14	14	-
17	Tobias Grünenfelder	Switzerland	77	-	-	16	-	32	29
18	Christian Greber	Austria	72	-	12	20	20	20	-
	Ambrosi Hoffmann	Switzerland	72	-	11	-	13	22	26
20	Patrik Järbyn	Sweden	71	16	-	9	15	15	16
21	Silvano Beltrametti	Switzerland	60	60	-	-	-	-	-
22	Marco Büchel	Liechtenstein	59	32	15	-	12	-	-
23	Bjarne Solbakken	Norway	44	22	20	2	-	-	-
24	Klaus Kröll	Austria	43	-	26	10	4	3	-
25	Hannes Trinkl	Austria	40	-	-	24	10	6	-
26	Kenneth Sivertsen	Norway	31	8	5	12	6	-	-
	Lasse Paulsen	Norway	31	9	2	-	2	18	-
28	Max Rauffer	Germany	30	-	-	14	16	-	-
29	Steve Locher	Switzerland	29	11	7	-	11	-	-
30	Peter Rzehak	Austria	27	18	-	-	-	9	-
31	Marc Bottollier	France	26	3	8	-	3	12	-
32	Christophe Saioni	France	25	-	-	11	10	4	-
33	Peter Fill	Italy	22	-	-	-	-	-	22
34	Sébastien Fournier-Bidoz	France	19	13	-	5	-	1	-
35	Claude Crétier	France	18	-	-	-	5	13	-
36	Franco Cavegn	Switzerland	14	-	14	-	-	-	-
	Bruno Kernen	Switzerland	14	-	7	-	-	7	-
38	Thomas Vonn	United States	11	-	-	-	-	11	-
39	Roland Fischnaller	Italy	10	-	10	-	-	-	-
	Jernej Koblar	Slovenia	10	-	-	3	7	-	-
41	Josef Strobl	Austria	6	6	-	-	-	-	-
	Michael Gufler	Italy	6	-	-	6	-	-	-
43	Audun Grønvold	Norway	5	5	-	-	-	-	-
44	Jeff Piccard	France	4	4	-	-	-	-	-
	Andrej Jerman	Slovenia	4	-	4	-	-	-	-
	Christoph Alster	Austria	4	-	-	4	-	-	-
47	Jürgen Hasler	Liechtenstein	3	-	3	-	-	-	-
	Patrick Staudacher	Italy	3	2	-	1	-	-	-
49	Erik Seletto	Italy	2	-	2	-	-	-	-
	Bode Miller	United States	2	-	-	-	-	2	-
51	Stein Kristian Strand	Norway	1	1	-	-	-	-	-

Alpine skiing World Cup
Men

Overall | Downhill | Super G | Giant slalom | Slalom | Combined

2002
