= 2001 Alpine Skiing World Cup – Men's giant slalom =

2001 Men's giant slalom World Cup
Previous: 2000	Next: 2002

Men's giant slalom World Cup 2000/2001

== Final point standings ==
In men's giant slalom World Cup 2000/2001 all results count.

Place	Name	Country	Total points	1 (Austria)	2 (United States)	9 (France)	12 (France)	14 (Italy)	15 (France)	16 (Switzerland)	25 (Japan)	32 (Sweden)
1	Hermann Maier	Austria	622	100	60	100	-	26	36	100	100	100
2	Michael von Grünigen	Switzerland	612	50	100	50	100	50	100	80	32	50
3	Erik Schlopy	United States	350	-	50	29	32	80	24	45	10	80
4	Benjamin Raich	Austria	320	-	-	22	36	36	80	26	60	60
5	Heinz Schilchegger	Austria	316	20	32	80	80	7	29	18	50	-
6	Marco Büchel	Liechtenstein	305	26	29	32	29	22	60	7	80	20
7	Fredrik Nyberg	Sweden	300	60	26	36	18	60	40	60	-	-
8	Lasse Kjus	Norway	241	-	80	26	-	32	33	36	-	45
9	Andreas Schifferer	Austria	185	40	-	60	45	40	-	-	-	-
	Massimiliano Blardone	Italy	185	11	10	-	40	12	-	40	40	32
11	Frédéric Covili	France	179	12	2	45	50	4	26	4	-	36
12	Christoph Gruber	Austria	166	-	-	-	-	100	16	50	-	-
13	Christian Mayer	Austria	163	45	45	20	7	-	-	10	20	16
14	Sami Uotila	Finland	159	22	13	11	16	20	-	12	45	20
15	Bode Miller	United States	158	-	26	40	60	-	32	-	-	-
16	Kjetil André Aamodt	Norway	150	32	12	-	-	-	50	20	36	-
17	Urs Kälin	Switzerland	144	7	7	-	-	16	45	24	16	29
18	Vincent Millet	France	135	-	22	-	20	18	20	29	26	-
19	Paul Accola	Switzerland	119	10	36	-	22	-	12	15	-	24
20	Didier Cuche	Switzerland	115	36	-	24	5	-	18	32	-	-
21	Stephan Eberharter	Austria	105	80	15	-	-	8	-	2	-	-
22	Josef Strobl	Austria	103	14	-	10	15	24	-	-	-	40
23	Didier Défago	Switzerland	102	-	20	9	26	-	-	3	15	29
24	Steve Locher	Switzerland	92	16	20	16	-	10	-	-	8	22
25	Joël Chenal	France	81	24	14	-	-	-	14	-	29	-
26	Kenneth Sivertsen	Norway	80	18	5	-	-	45	-	-	12	-
27	Rainer Salzgeber	Austria	68	29	20	13	6	-	-	-	-	-
28	Bjarne Solbakken	Norway	66	15	-	18	11	-	-	-	22	-
29	Mitja Kunc	Slovenia	63	-	-	-	2	29	-	8	24	-
30	Jeff Piccard	France	57	-	-	7	10	9	13	5	13	-
	Hans Knauß	Austria	51	-	-	12	24	-	15	-	-	-
31	Patrick Holzer	Italy	51	-	40	5	-	-	-	6	-	-
	Alessandro Roberto	Italy	51	-	4	-	9	-	7	22	9	-
34	Jernej Koblar	Slovenia	49	-	3	16	-	13	6	-	11	-
35	Lasse Paulsen	Norway	45	-	-	-	-	15	-	16	14	-
36	Rainer Schönfelder	Austria	37	8	-	-	-	11	-	-	18	-
	Uroš Pavlovčič	Slovenia	37	-	-	-	3	14	-	14	6	-
38	Daron Rahlves	United States	36	-	-	14	12	-	10	-	-	-
39	Thomas Grandi	Canada	29	13	-	-	-	-	9	-	7	-
40	Christophe Saioni	France	25	-	-	8	-	-	-	13	4	-
41	Davide Simoncelli	Italy	22	-	-	-	14	-	8	-	-	-
42	Ivan Bormolini	Italy	20	-	11	-	-	-	-	9	-	-
43	Jernej Reberšak	Slovenia	19	-	-	6	13	-	-	-	-	-
44	Casey Puckett	United States	18	9	9	-	-	-	-	-	-	-
45	Raphaël Burtin	France	15	-	-	-	4	-	11	-	-	-
46	Tobias Grünenfelder	Switzerland	14	-	8	-	-	6	-	-	-	-
47	Patrice Manuel	France	13	-	-	3	-	5	-	-	5	-
48	Walter Girardi	Italy	12	-	-	-	-	-	-	12	-	-
49	Dane Spencer	United States	11	5	6	-	-	-	-	-	-	-
50	Thomas Vonn	United States	9	-	-	-	9	-	-	-	-	-
51	Jean-Philippe Roy	Canada	8	4	-	4	-	-	-	-	-	-
52	Kalle Palander	Finland	6	6	-	-	-	-	-	-	-	-

Note:

In the last race only the best racers were allowed to compete and only the best 15 finishers were awarded with points.

Alpine Skiing World Cup
Men

Overall | Downhill | Super G | Giant slalom | Slalom | Combined

2001
