= Alpine skiing at the 2002 Winter Olympics – Men's downhill =

Men's downhill at the XIX Olympic Winter Games
- Pictogram for alpine skiing
- Venue: Snowbasin
- Date: February 10, 2002
- Competitors: 55 from 22 nations
- Winning time: 1:39.13

Medalists
1st place, gold medalist(s)		Fritz Strobl	Austria
2nd place, silver medalist(s)		Lasse Kjus	Norway
3rd place, bronze medalist(s)		Stephan Eberharter	Austria

Men's Downhill
- Location: Snowbasin; Grizzly Downhill
- Vertical: 883 m (2,897 ft)
- Top elevation: 2,831 m (9,288 ft)
- Base elevation: 1,948 m (6,391 ft)

The marquee event of alpine skiing was held on Sunday, February 10, at the Snowbasin ski area, east of Ogden under clear skies.

Designed by 1972 gold medalist Bernhard Russi, the steep "Grizzly Downhill" course was just 1.777 miles (2.860 km) in length, and began at a lofty 9,288 feet (2,831 m) above sea level, with a vertical drop of 2,897 feet (883 m). The average gradient on the Grizzly Downhill was 30.87% (17.98°), exceeding the classic layouts of Kitzbühel (860 m vertical / 3312 m length = 25.97%, 15.05°) and Wengen (1025 m vertical / 4455 m length = 23.01%, 13.30°).

The top five finishers completed the course in less than a hundred seconds, making it the quickest descending Olympic downhill. The average speed of the medalists for the entire course exceeded 64 mph (103 km/h), rating it among the fastest courses in international competition.

Pre-race favorite Stephan Eberharter of Austria took the bronze medal, bested by compatriot Fritz Strobl and all-arounder Lasse Kjus of Norway. Strobl's average speed was 64.538 mph (103.864 km/h), at an average vertical descent of 29.224 ft/s (8.907 m/s).

== Results ==
The race was started at 10:00 local time, (UTC −7). At the starting gate, the skies were clear, the temperature was −3.0 °C (27 °F), and the snow condition was hard; the temperature at the finish was lower, at −4.0 °C (25 °F).

Rank	Bib	Name	Country	Time	Difference
1st place, gold medalist(s)	10	Fritz Strobl	Austria	1:39.13	—
2nd place, silver medalist(s)	13	Lasse Kjus	Norway	1:39.35	+0.22
3rd place, bronze medalist(s)	9	Stephan Eberharter	Austria	1:39.41	+0.28
4	12	Kjetil André Aamodt	Norway	1:39.78	+0.65
5	19	Claude Crétier	France	1:39.96	+0.83
6	7	Christian Greber	Austria	1:40.00	+0.87
7	3	Fredrik Nyberg	Sweden	1:40.30	+1.17
8	15	Ambrosi Hoffmann	Switzerland	1:40.31	+1.18
9	31	Marco Sullivan	United States	1:40.37	+1.24
10	2	Sébastien Fournier-Bidoz	France	1:40.39	+1.26
11	18	Pierre-Emmanuel Dalcin	France	1:40.58	+1.45
12	23	Bjarne Solbakken	Norway	1:40.74	+1.61
12	5	Antoine Dénériaz	France	1:40.74	+1.61
14	14	Didier Cuche	Switzerland	1:40.76	+1.63
15	11	Franco Cavegn	Switzerland	1:40.81	+1.68
16	17	Daron Rahlves	United States	1:40.84	+1.71
17	21	Roland Fischnaller	Italy	1:40.85	+1.72
18	28	Patrik Järbyn	Sweden	1:41.05	+1.92
19	4	Alessandro Fattori	Italy	1:41.24	+2.11
20	22	Christoph Gruber	Austria	1:41.25	+2.12
21	29	Didier Défago	Switzerland	1:41.27	+2.14
22	6	Kurt Sulzenbacher	Italy	1:41.56	+2.43
23	16	Peter Pen	Slovenia	1:41.66	+2.53
24	27	Ed Podivinsky	Canada	1:41.69	+2.56
25	20	Kenneth Sivertsen	Norway	1:41.70	+2.57
26	32	Jürgen Hasler	Liechtenstein	1:41.76	+2.63
27	34	Jakub Fiala	United States	1:41.84	+2.71
28	41	Andrej Jerman	Slovenia	1:41.85	+2.72
29	25	Marco Büchel	Liechtenstein	1:41.86	+2.73
29	1	Scott Macartney	United States	1:41.86	+2.73
31	26	Gregor Sparovec	Slovenia	1:41.88	+2.75
32	24	Darin McBeath	Canada	1:42.15	+3.02
33	36	Jernej Koblar	Slovenia	1:42.41	+3.18
34	30	Max Rauffer	Germany	1:42.52	+3.39
35	8	Kristian Ghedina	Italy	1:42.54	+3.41
36	46	Maksim Kedrin	Russia	1:43.04	+3.91
37	39	AJ Bear	Australia	1:43.19	+4.06
38	35	Dave Anderson	Canada	1:43.20	+4.07
39	50	Ondřej Bank	Czech Republic	1:43.33	+4.20
40	42	Borek Zakouřil	Czech Republic	1:43.63	+4.50
41	40	Andrey Filichkin	Russia	1:43.73	+4.60
42	43	Yasuyuki Takishita	Japan	1:43.75	+4.62
43	37	Pavel Chestakov	Russia	1:44.35	+5.22
44	48	Sergey Komarov	Russia	1:45.25	+6.12
45	38	Craig Branch	Australia	1:45.34	+6.21
46	44	Jan Holický	Czech Republic	1:45.59	+6.36
47	54	Ivan Heimschild	Slovakia	1:46.36	+7.23
48	47	Maui Gayme	Chile	1:47.63	+8.50
49	52	Nikolay Skriabin	Ukraine	1:47.65	+8.52
50	45	Mikael Gayme	Chile	1:48.37	+9.24
51	55	Alexander Heath	South Africa	1:48.84	+9.71
52	51	Nicolás Arsel	Argentina	1:49.75	+10.62
53	53	Paul Schwarzacher-Joyce	Ireland	1:54.42	+15.29
	49	Ross Green	Great Britain	DNS	
	33	Cristian Javier Simari Birkner	Argentina	DSQ	
