= 2000 Alpine Skiing World Cup – Men's giant slalom =

2000 Men's giant slalom World Cup
Previous: 1999	Next: 2001

Men's giant slalom World Cup 1999/2000

== Final point standings ==
In men's giant slalom World Cup 1999/2000 all results count. Austrian athletes won eight races out of nine.

Place	Name	Country	Total points	1 (France)	3 (United States)	11 (Italy)	13 (Austria)	24 (Germany)	29 (South Korea)	34 (Slovenia)	36 (Austria)	39 (Italy)
1	Hermann Maier	Austria	520	100	100	80	80	100	-	-	60	-
2	Christian Mayer	Austria	517	40	15	36	100	32	14	100	100	80
3	Michael von Grünigen	Switzerland	466	80	80	26	50	60	80	32	18	40
4	Benjamin Raich	Austria	420	45	32	12	60	45	100	-	26	100
5	Joël Chenal	France	349	26	18	100	40	16	60	80	9	-
6	Marco Büchel	Liechtenstein	290	-	13	-	13	50	45	60	80	29
7	Fredrik Nyberg	Sweden	279	-	45	24	32	80	-	26	40	32
8	Mitja Kunc	Slovenia	275	22	16	20	20	29	50	36	32	50
9	Kjetil André Aamodt	Norway	259	60	40	50	36	26	18	29	-	-
10	Heinz Schilchegger	Austria	233	9	20	13	14	24	7	50	36	60
11	Andreas Schifferer	Austria	231	-	60	40	45	8	-	4	50	24
12	Didier Cuche	Switzerland	196	29	24	45	29	9	9	10	15	26
13	Paul Accola	Switzerland	178	7	22	15	8	40	40	-	24	22
14	Sami Uotila	Finland	172	10	-	29	-	36	36	45	-	16
15	Didier Défago	Switzerland	164	-	9	10	20	20	32	24	13	36
16	Stephan Eberharter	Austria	154	60	50	-	-	15	4	5	-	20
17	Hans Knauß	Austria	128	-	11	32	15	-	-	3	22	45
18	Urs Kälin	Switzerland	118	-	14	8	12	12	11	14	29	18
19	Josef Strobl	Austria	116	32	-	18	22	18	-	18	8	-
	Rainer Salzgeber	Austria	116	14	-	60	-	13	24	-	5	-
21	Steve Locher	Switzerland	98	-	26	16	26	-	8	8	14	-
22	Markus Eberle	Austria	97	12	-	-	-	-	-	40	45	-
23	Vincent Millet	France	81	18	-	-	6	-	15	22	20	-
24	Patrick Holzer	Italy	77	36	-	11	4	14	-	2	10	-
25	Christophe Saioni	France	76	24	29	7	16	-	-	-	-	-
26	Raphaël Burtin	France	73	15	-	-	-	6	29	12	11	-
27	Christoph Gruber	Austria	62	3	-	-	24	22	-	13	-	-
28	Harald Christian Strand Nilsen	Norway	48	-	-	-	10	-	22	16	-	-
29	Rainer Schönfelder	Austria	42	16	-	-	-	-	26	-	-	-
	Bjarne Solbakken	Norway	42	-	4	-	-	11	-	20	7	-
31	Bode Miller	United States	39	12	-	22	-	-	5	-	-	-
32	Lasse Kjus	Norway	36	-	36	-	-	-	-	-	-	-
	Kalle Palander	Finland	36	-	-	-	11	-	10	15	-	-
34	Alessandro Roberto	Italy	35	-	-	-	-	7	16	12	-	-
35	Frederic Covili	France	30	4	8	-	9	-	-	9	-	-
	Dane Spencer	United States	30	-	12	-	-	-	12	6	-	-
37	Giorgio Rocca	Italy	29	20	-	6	3	-	-	-	-	-
38	Erik Schlopy	United States	26	-	10	-	-	-	-	-	16	-
39	Thomas Vonn	United States	25	-	7	14	-	-	-	-	4	-
40	Jernej Koblar	Slovenia	24	-	5	9	-	10	-	-	-	-
41	Jure Košir	Slovenia	23	13	-	5	-	5	-	-	-	-
42	Matteo Nana	Italy	21	8	-	-	-	-	6	7	-	-
43	Arnold Rieder	Italy	20	-	-	-	-	-	20	-	-	-
44	Patrick Thaler	Italy	13	-	-	-	-	-	13	-	-	-
45	Lasse Paulsen	Norway	12	-	-	-	-	-	-	-	12	-
46	Uroš Pavlovčič	Slovenia	10	2	-	-	8	-	-	-	-	-
47	Alois Vogl	Germany	6	6	-	-	-	-	-	-	-	-
	Tom Stiansen	Norway	6	-	6	-	-	-	-	-	-	-
	Daron Rahlves	United States	6	-	-	-	-	-	-	-	6	-
50	Sébastien Amiez	France	5	5	-	-	-	-	-	-	-	-
	Jeff Piccard	France	5	-	-	-	5	-	-	-	-	-

Alpine Skiing World Cup
Men

Overall | Downhill | Super G | Giant slalom | Slalom | Combined

2000
