= Alpine skiing at the 2002 Winter Olympics – Men's super-G =

Men's super-G at the XIX Olympic Winter Games
- Pictogram for alpine skiing
- Venue: Snowbasin
- Date: February 16, 2002
- Competitors: 56 from 23 nations
- Winning time: 1:21.58

Medalists
1st place, gold medalist(s)		Kjetil André Aamodt	Norway
2nd place, silver medalist(s)		Stephan Eberharter	Austria
3rd place, bronze medalist(s)		Andreas Schifferer	Austria

Men's Super-G
- Location: Snowbasin; Grizzly Super-G
- Vertical: 648 m (2,126 ft)
- Top elevation: 2,596 m (8,517 ft)
- Base elevation: 1,948 m (6,391 ft)

The Men's Super-G competition of the Salt Lake 2002 Olympics was held at Snowbasin on Saturday, February 16.

The defending world champion was Daron Rahlves of the United States, Austria's Hermann Maier was the defending Olympic and World Cup super-G champion, and teammate Stephan Eberharter led the current season. Maier was out for the season after a serious motorcycle accident in August.

Ten years after his first Olympic title in 1992, Kjetil André Aamodt of Norway won his second super-G gold, and his second gold of the 2002 Games. Eberharter took the silver, and teammate Andreas Schifferer was the bronze medalist; Rahlves was eighth.

The course started at an elevation of 2,596 m (8,517 ft) above sea level with a vertical drop of 648 m (2,126 ft) and a course length of 2.018 km (1.25 mi). Aamodt's winning time of 81.58 seconds yielded an average course speed of 89.051 km/h (55.3 mph), with an average vertical descent rate of 7.943 m/s (26.1 ft/s).

== Results ==
The race was started at 10:00 local time, (UTC−7). At the starting gate, the skies were clear, the temperature was 5 °C (41 °F), and the snow condition was hard; the temperature at the finish was lower at 1 °C (34 °F).

Rank	Bib	Name	Country	Time	Difference
1st place, gold medalist(s)	3	Kjetil André Aamodt	Norway	1:21.58	—
2nd place, silver medalist(s)	7	Stephan Eberharter	Austria	1:21.68	+0.10
3rd place, bronze medalist(s)	11	Andreas Schifferer	Austria	1:21.83	+0.25
4	10	Fritz Strobl	Austria	1:21.92	+0.34
5	15	Bjarne Solbakken	Norway	1:22.10	+0.52
6	13	Didier Défago	Switzerland	1:22.27	+0.69
7	8	Christoph Gruber	Austria	1:22.35	+0.77
8	4	Daron Rahlves	United States	1:22.48	+0.90
9	33	Thomas Vonn	United States	1:23.22	+1.64
10	1	Paul Accola	Switzerland	1:23.33	+1.75
11	25	Patrik Järbyn	Sweden	1:23.40	+1.82
12	28	Tobias Grünenfelder	Switzerland	1:23.43	+1.85
13	30	Gregor Šparovec	Slovenia	1:23.52	+1.94
13	2	Marco Büchel	Liechtenstein	1:23.52	+1.94
15	29	Jernej Koblar	Slovenia	1:23.82	+2.24
15	20	Sébastien Fournier	France	1:23.82	+2.24
17	22	Roland Fischnaller	Italy	1:23.87	+2.29
18	18	Patrick Staudacher	Italy	1:23.95	+2.37
19	14	Kenneth Sivertsen	Norway	1:24.16	+2.58
20	23	Christophe Saioni	France	1:24.28	+2.70
21	17	Andrej Jerman	Slovenia	1:24.35	+2.77
22	16	Max Rauffer	Germany	1:24.54	+2.96
23	40	Pavel Chestakov	Russia	1:25.16	+3.58
24	43	Petr Záhrobský	Czech Republic	1:25.67	+4.09
25	34	Scott Macartney	United States	1:25.80	+4.22
26	24	Kurt Sulzenbacher	Italy	1:26.44	+4.86
27	39	Craig Branch	Australia	1:27.15	+5.57
28	42	Ivan Heimschild	Slovakia	1:27.74	+6.16
29	53	Nikolay Skriabin	Ukraine	1:27.84	+6.26
30	45	Nicolas Arsel	Argentina	1:28.55	+6.97
31	50	Duncan Grob	Chile	1:30.35	+8.77
32	52	Agustín García	Argentina	1:30.59	+9.01
33	54	Paul Schwarzacher-Joyce	Ireland	1:31.30	+9.72
34	56	Péter Vincze	Hungary	1:50.40	+28.82
	6	Fredrik Nyberg	Sweden	DNF	
	9	Lasse Kjus	Norway	DNF	
	12	Alessandro Fattori	Italy	DNF	
	19	Claude Crétier	France	DNF	
	21	Darin McBeath	Canada	DNF	
	26	Jürgen Hasler	Liechtenstein	DNF	
	31	Marco Sullivan	United States	DNF	
	32	Thomas Grandi	Canada	DNF	
	36	Michael Riegler	Liechtenstein	DNF	
	37	Borek Zakouril	Czech Republic	DNF	
	38	Ed Podivinsky	Canada	DNF	
	41	Andrey Filichkin	Russia	DNF	
	44	Yasuyuki Takishita	Japan	DNF	
	46	Mikael Gayme	Chile	DNF	
	48	Sergey Komarov	Russia	DNF	
	49	Maui Gayme	Chile	DNF	
	51	Vassilis Dimitriadis	Greece	DNF	
	55	Andrei Drygin	Tajikistan	DNF	
	5	Didier Cuche	Switzerland	DSQ	
	27	Peter Pen	Slovenia	DSQ	
	35	A. J. Bear	Australia	DSQ	
	47	Ondřej Bank	Czech Republic	DNS	
