= Alpine skiing at the 2002 Winter Olympics – Men's giant slalom =

Men's giant slalom at the XIX Olympic Winter Games
- Pictogram for alpine skiing
- Venue: Park City
- Date: February 21, 2002
- Competitors: 78 from 39 nations
- Winning time: 2:23.28

Medalists
1st place, gold medalist(s)		Stephan Eberharter	Austria
2nd place, silver medalist(s)		Bode Miller	United States
3rd place, bronze medalist(s)		Lasse Kjus	Norway

The event was held on February 21 at Park City. Stephan Eberharter, age 32.9, became the oldest man to win an alpine event at the Olympics.

== Results ==
Complete results from the men's giant slalom event at the 2002 Winter Olympics.

Rank	Name	Country	Run 1	Run 2	Time	Difference
1st place, gold medalist(s)	Stephan Eberharter	Austria	1:11.98	1:11.30	2:23.28	
2nd place, silver medalist(s)	Bode Miller	United States	1:12.89	1:11.27	2:24.16	+0.88
3rd place, bronze medalist(s)	Lasse Kjus	Norway	1:12.79	1:11.53	2:24.32	+1.04
4	Benjamin Raich	Austria	1:12.83	1:11.57	2:24.40	+1.12
5	Christoph Gruber	Austria	1:12.82	1:11.59	2:24.41	+1.13
6	Bjarne Solbakken	Norway	1:13.15	1:11.35	2:24.40	+1.22
7	Kjetil André Aamodt	Norway	1:13.14	1:11.48	2:24.62	+1.34
8	Massimiliano Blardone	Italy	1:12.72	1:12.15	2:24.87	+1.59
9	Ivica Kostelić	Croatia	1:13.05	1:11.87	2:24.92	+1.64
10	Didier Cuche	Switzerland	1:13.25	1:11.75	2:25.00	+1.72
11	Michael von Grünigen	Switzerland	1:13.27	1:11.80	2:25.07	+1.79
12	Thomas Grandi	Canada	1:13.74	1:11.50	2:25.24	+1.96
13	Fredrik Nyberg	Sweden	1:13.41	1:11.88	2:25.29	+2.01
14	Didier Défago	Switzerland	1:13.74	1:11.80	2:25.54	+2.26
15	Frederic Covili	France	1:13.70	1:11.95	2:25.65	+2.37
16	Dane Spencer	United States	1:14.03	1:11.65	2:25.68	+2.40
17	Marco Büchel	Liechtenstein	1:13.67	1:12.22	2:25.89	+2.61
18	Jernej Koblar	Slovenia	1:13.15	1:13.21	2:26.36	+3.08
19	Thomas Vonn	United States	1:14.59	1:11.87	2:26.46	+3.18
20	Kenneth Sivertsen	Norway	1:14.16	1:12.35	2:26.51	+3.23
21	Joël Chenal	France	1:13.76	1:13.32	2:27.08	+3.08
22	Alessandro Roberto	Italy	1:14.65	1:12.88	2:27.53	+4.25
23	Achim Vogt	Liechtenstein	1:14.84	1:12.74	2:27.58	+4.30
24	Patrik Järbyn	Sweden	1:14.95	1:12.71	2:27.66	+4.38
25	Stanley Hayer	Czech Republic	1:14.69	1:13.14	2:27.83	+4.55
26	Giorgio Rocca	Italy	1:14.91	1:12.94	2:27.85	+4.57
27	Markus Ganahl	Liechtenstein	1:14.70	1:13.22	2:27.92	+4.64
28	Mitja Kunc	Slovenia	1:14.95	1:13.22	2:28.17	+4.89
29	Ross Green	Great Britain	1:15.90	1:13.41	2:29.31	+6.03
30	Cristian Javier Simari Birkner	Argentina	1:16.00	1:13.79	2:29.79	+6.51
31	Petr Záhrobský	Czech Republic	1:15.82	1:14.14	2:29.96	+6.68
32	Pavel Chestakov	Russia	1:15.80	1:14.17	2:29.97	+6.69
33	Bradley Wall	Australia	1:15.69	1:14.59	2:30.28	+7.00
34	Akira Sasaki	Japan	1:16.11	1:14.47	2:30.58	+7.30
35	Michael Riegler	Liechtenstein	1:16.16	1:14.58	2:30.74	+7.46
36	Alex Antor	Andorra	1:16.66	1:14.73	2:31.39	+8.11
37	Kiminobu Kimura	Japan	1:17.19	1:14.67	2:31.86	+8.58
38	Stefan Georgiev	Bulgaria	1:18.01	1:15.00	2:33.01	+9.73
39	Victor Gomez	Andorra	1:17.83	1:15.50	2:33.33	+10.05
40	Sergey Komarov	Russia	1:17.78	1:25.78	2:33.56	+10.28
41	Marko Đorđević	FR Yugoslavia	1:17.25	1:16.40	2:33.65	+10.37
42	Kristinn Magnússon	Iceland	1:17.50	1:16.29	2:33.79	+10.51
43	Vasilios Dimitriadis	Greece	1:19.30	1:16.85	2:36.15	+12.87
44	Tahir Bisić	Bosnia and Herzegovina	1:18.96	1:17.21	2:36.17	+12.89
45	Nikolay Skriabin	Ukraine	1:18.57	1:17.70	2:36.27	+12.99
46	Gang Min-hyeok	South Korea	1:19.11	1:17.99	2:37.10	+13.82
47	Byun Jong-moon	South Korea	1:19.49	1:17.11	2:37.20	+13.92
48	Alexander Heath	South Africa	1:19.32	1:17.95	2:37.27	+13.99
49	Maui Gayme	Chile	1:19.76	1:17.58	2:37.34	+14.06
50	Jesse Teat	New Zealand	1:20.31	1:17.76	2:38.07	+14.79
51	Todd Haywood	New Zealand	1:19.99	1:18.11	2:38.10	+14.82
52	Dejan Panovski	Macedonia	1:20.48	1:18.30	2:38.78	+15.50
53	Danil Anisimov	Kazakhstan	1:21.40	1:19.21	2:40.61	+17.33
54	Theodoros Christodoulou	Cyprus	1:21.67	1:19.92	2:41.59	+18.31
55	Laurence Thoms	Fiji	1:22.01	1:19.97	2:41.98	+18.70
56	Peter Vincze	Hungary	1:23.99	1:22.74	2:46.73	+23.45
57	Gian Matteo Giordani	San Marino	1:25.02	1:23.29	2:48.31	+25.03
	Alexander Ploner	Italy	1:12.86	DNF		
	Uros Pavlovcic	Slovenia	1:14.01	DNF		
	Jure Kosir	Slovenia	1:14.10	DNF		
	Vincent Millet	France	1:14.03	DNF		
	Tobias Grünenfelder	Switzerland	1:14.15	DNF		
	Jean-Philippe Roy	Canada	1:14.34	DNF		
	Kalle Palander	Finland	1:14.57	DNF		
	Borek Zakouril	Czech Republic	1:15.56	DNF		
	Andrey Filichkin	Russia	1:15.74	DNF		
	Björgvin Björgvinsson	Iceland	1:15.86	DNF		
	Enis Becirbegovic	Bosnia and Herzegovina	1:17.56	DNF		
	Jóhann Haraldsson	Iceland	1:19.10	DNF		
	Hur Seung-wook	South Korea	1:19.32	DNF		
	Andrei Drygin	Tajikistan	1:22.01	DNF		
	Erik Schlopy	United States	1:24.06	DNS		
	Hans Knauß	Austria	DNF			
	Sami Uotila	Finland	DNF			
	Ondřej Bank	Czech Republic	DNF			
	Ivan Heimschild	Slovakia	DNF			
	Ivars Ciaguns	Latvia	DNF			
	Nikolai Hentsch	Brazil	DSQ			
