= FIS Alpine World Ski Championships 2007 – Men's downhill =

Men's downhill at the FIS Alpine World Ski Championships 2007
- Venue: Åre ski resort
- Location: Åre, Sweden
- Dates: 9 February
- Competitors: 56 from 20 nations
- Winning time: 1:44.68

Medalists
gold medal	Aksel Lund Svindal	Norway
silver medal	Jan Hudec	Canada
bronze medal	Patrik Järbyn	Sweden

Men's Downhill
- Location: Olympia; Åre, Sweden
- Vertical: 844 m (2,769 ft)
- Top elevation: 1,240 m (4,068 ft)
- Base elevation: 396 m (1,299 ft)
- Longest run: 2.922 km (1.82 mi)

The Men's downhill competition of the FIS Alpine World Ski Championships 2007 at Åre, Sweden, was run on Sunday, February 11.

Norway's Aksel Lund Svindal won the gold medal, Jan Hudec of Canada took the silver, and the bronze medalist was Patrik Järbyn of host Sweden.

The Olympia race course was 2.922 km (1.82 mi) in length, with a vertical drop of 844 m (2,769 ft) from a starting elevation of 1,240 m (4,068 ft) above sea level. Svindall's winning time of 104.68 seconds yielded an average speed of 100.489 km/h (62.4 mph) and an average vertical descent rate of 8.0627 m/s (26.5 ft/s).

== Results ==
Delayed a day due to fog, the race started at 10:00 CET (UTC+1) in fog. The air temperature was −12 °C (10 °F) at the starting gate and −8 °C (18 °F) at the finish.

Rank	Name	Country	Time	Diff.
1st place, gold medalist(s)	Aksel Lund Svindal	Norway	1:44.68	—
2nd place, silver medalist(s)	Jan Hudec	Canada	1:45.40	+0.72
3rd place, bronze medalist(s)	Patrik Järbyn	Sweden	1:45.65	+0.97
4	Erik Guay	Canada	1:45.67	+0.99
5	Ambrosi Hoffmann	Switzerland	1:45.68	+1.00
6	Didier Cuche	Switzerland	1:45.69	+1.01
7	Bode Miller	United States	1:45.95	+1.27
8	Mario Scheiber	Austria	1:45.99	+1.31
9	Manuel Osborne-Paradis	Canada	1:46.11	+1.43
10	Didier Défago	Switzerland	1:46.12	+1.44
11	Peter Fill	Italy	1:46.39	+1.71
12	Bruno Kernen	Switzerland	1:46.41	+1.73
13	Hermann Maier	Austria	1:46.43	+1.75
14	Kurt Sulzenbacher	Italy	1:46.54	+1.86
15	Marc Bottollier-Lasquin	France	1:46.56	+1.88
15	Michael Walchhofer	Austria	1:46.56	+1.88
17	Andrej Jerman	Slovenia	1:46.58	+1.90
18	Yannick Bertrand	France	1:46.78	+2.10
19	Andrej Šporn	Slovenia	1:46.83	+2.15
19	Pierre-Emmanuel Dalcin	France	1:46.83	+2.15
21	Steven Nyman	United States	1:46.86	+2.18
22	Fritz Strobl	Austria	1:46.97	+2.29
23	Hans Olsson	Sweden	1:47.08	+2.40
24	Niklas Rainer	Sweden	1:47.22	+2.54
25	Lars Elton Myhre	Norway	1:47.36	+2.68
26	Finlay Mickel	United Kingdom	1:47.45	+2.77
27	Johannes Stehle	Germany	1:47.49	+2.81
28	Marco Sullivan	United States	1:47.58	+2.90
29	Bjarne Solbakken	Norway	1:47.63	+2.95
30	Scott Macartney	United States	1:47.66	+2.98
31	John Kucera	Canada	1:47.72	+3.04
32	Patrick Staudacher	Italy	1:47.79	+3.11
33	Antoine Dénériaz	France	1:47.82	+3.14
34	Natko Zrnčić-Dim	Croatia	1:47.87	+3.19
35	Ondřej Bank	Czech Republic	1:47.92	+3.24
36	Matts Olsson	Sweden	1:48.05	+3.37
37	Petr Záhrobský	Czech Republic	1:48.26	+3.58
38	Christof Innerhofer	Italy	1:48.30	+3.62
39	Aleš Gorza	Slovenia	1:48.84	+4.16
40	Jouni Pellinen	Finland	1:48.95	+4.27
41	Thomas Lanning	United States	1:49.01	+4.33
42	Andreas Romar	Finland	1:49.19	+4.51
43	Aleksandr Khoroshilov	Russia	1:49.37	+4.69
44	Maui Gayme	Chile	1:50.35	+5.67
45	Ivan Ratkić	Croatia	1:50.46	+5.78
46	Roger Vidosa	Andorra	1:50.78	+6.10
47	Jorge Mandrú	Chile	1:51.19	+6.51
48	Tin Široki	Croatia	1:51.57	+6.89
—	Stephan Keppler	Germany	DNF	—
—	Marco Büchel	Liechtenstein	DNF	—
—	Rok Perko	Slovenia	DNF	—
—	Mark Bridgwater	New Zealand	DNF	—
—	Cristián Anguita	Chile	DNF	—
—	Konstantin Sats	Russia	DNF	—
—	Filip Trejbal	Czech Republic	DNS	
—	Wojciech Zagórski	Poland	DNS	
