= Burtin =

Burtin is a French surname that may refer to

- Armand Burtin (1896–1972), French middle-distance runner
- Jacques Burtin (born 1955), French composer, writer and filmmaker
- Nicolas Burtin (born 1972), French alpine skier
- Raphaël Burtin (born 1977), French alpine skier, brother of Nicolas
- Will Burtin (1908–1972), German graphic designer
