= Kenneth Sivertsen =

Kenneth Sivertsen may refer to:

- Kenneth Sivertsen (musician) (1961–2006), Norwegian musician, composer, poet, and comedian
- Kenneth Sivertsen (skier) (born 1973), Norwegian alpine skier
