= Roland Fischnaller =

Roland Fischnaller may refer to:

- Roland Fischnaller (snowboarder) (born 1980), Italian snowboarder
- Roland Fischnaller (alpine skier) (born 1975), Italian former alpine skier
