= Saioni =

Saioni is a surname. Notable people with the surname include:

- Christophe Saioni (born 1969), French skier
- Maruša Ferk Saioni (born 1988), Slovenian skier
