= Brad Wall (skier) =

Australian alpine skier (born 1979)

Personal information
- Nationality: Australia
- Born: 11 March 1979 (age 46) Cooma, New South Wales, Australia
- Occupation: Alpine skier

Sport
- Event: Giant slalom

Brad Wall (born 11 March 1979) is an Australian former alpine skier. He competed at the 2002 Winter Olympics and the 2006 Winter Olympics.
