= Dave Anderson (alpine skier) =

Canadian alpine skier (born 1979)

Dave Anderson (born 14 December 1979) is a Canadian former alpine skier who competed in the 2002 Winter Olympics.
