= Charlie Bergendahl =

Swedish alpine skier (born 1977)

Charlie Bergendahl (born 1977) is a retired Swedish alpine skier.

He competed in three events each at the 1995 and 1996 Junior World Championships, his best finish being a 14th place in slalom at the 1995 edition. He finished 26th in the super-G at the 2001 World Championships.

He made his World Cup debut in October 1998 in Sölden. He collected his first World Cup points with a 26th place in January 2001 in Garmisch-Partenkirchen. His last World Cup outing came in February 2005 in Kranjska Gora.

He represented the sports club Bjursås IK.
