= Vincent Blanc =

French alpine skier (born 1973)

- Born: 1973|04|9
- Years active: 1992-2001

Vincent Blanc (born 1973) is a retired French alpine skier.

He competed in two events at the 1992 Junior World Championships, finishing lowly in both super-G and downhill. He would compete internationally in these events exclusively, achieving the most in downhill races.

He made his World Cup debut in December 1995 in Gröden. He collected his first World Cup points with a 25th place in the December 1996 Bormio downhill. In 1997–98 he steadily improved to 23rd in Beaver Creek, 22nd in Garmisch-Partenkirchen and 18th in Val d'Isere; all in the downhill event. After reaching a career best World Cup placement in the January 2000 Kitzbühel downhill, finishing 17th, the 2001 Kitzbühel downhill was his last World Cup outing. He stopped competition when his first child was born.

He represented the sports club SC GD Bornan.

Currently Vincent Blanc live in the French Alps near Grenoble.
