= Marco Sullivan =

American alpine skier

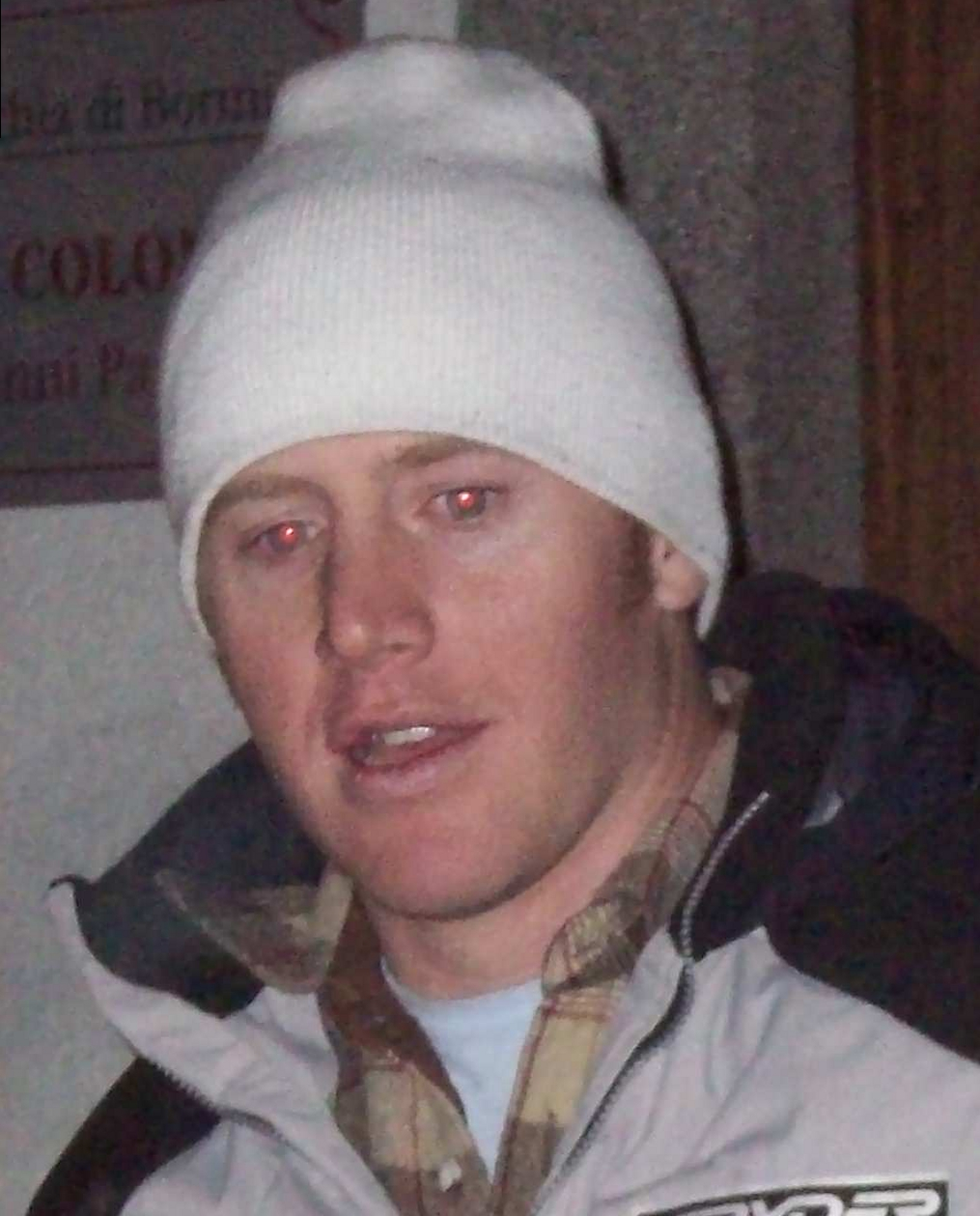
- The U.S. alpine skier Marco Sullivan

Personal information
- Born: April 27, 1980 (age 46) Truckee, California, U.S.
- Height: 183 cm (6 ft 0 in)
- Website: americandownhiller.com

Skiing career
- Sport: Alpine skiing
- Club: Squaw Valley Ski Team
- Retired: March 13, 2016 (age 35)
- Disciplines: Downhill, Super G, Combined
- World Cup debut: December 7, 2001 (age 21)

Olympics
- Teams: 4 – (2002–2014)
- Medals: 0

World Championships
- Teams: 4 – (2003, '07, '09, '13)
- Medals: 0

World Cup
- Seasons: 13 – (2002, '03, '06–16)
- Wins: 1 – (1 DH)
- Podiums: 4 – (4 DH)
- Overall titles: 0 – (28th in 2008)
- Discipline titles: 0 – (4th in DH, 2008)
Medal record
Men's alpine skiing
Representing the United States
Junior World Ski Championships
Bronze medal – third place	2000 Quebec	Slalom

Marco Sullivan (born April 27, 1980) is a former World Cup alpine ski racer from the United States. Born in Truckee, California, he competed primarily in the speed events of Downhill and Super G.

Sullivan competed in the 2002 and 2010 Winter Olympics, and four World Championships. He won one World Cup race, a downhill in Chamonix, France, in January 2008.

== World Cup ==
Sullivan made his World Cup debut in December 2001, and took one victory, the renowned downhill in Chamonix, France, on January 26, 2008. He won the race in 2:00.11, ahead of Swiss star Didier Cuche.

In early December 2003, Sullivan injured his knee in a downhill training run at Beaver Creek. It happened at the last jump of the Birds of Prey course and caused him to miss the rest of the 2004 season. While training in France in October 2004, Sullivan injured the same knee again and was out for the 2005 season as well.

Sullivan attained his first World Cup podium on November 24, 2007, when he finished second at the season's first downhill at Lake Louise, a good-for-gliders course in the Canadian Rockies. His victory at Chamonix came two months later, and he went on to finish fourth in the World Cup downhill standings, the best seasonal result of his career.

In late December 2010, Sullivan crashed during a training run on the Stelvio course at Bormio, Italy (video). He sustained a concussion which ended his 2011 season, including the World Championships. After two months, he was cleared by doctors to get back on skis in early March.

=== Season standings ===
Season	Age	Overall	Slalom	Giant Slalom	Super G	Downhill	Combined
2002	21	144	—	—	—	55	—
2003	22	55	—	—	26	20	—
2004	23						
2005	24						
2006	25	86	—	—	39	31	—
2007	26	52	—	—	—	24	42
2008	27	26	—	—	30	4	—
2009	28	30	—	—	13	15	—
2010	29	65	—	—	25	29	—
2011	30	167	—	—	59	—	—
2012	31	93	—	—	45	37	—
2013	32	55	—	—	—	14	—
2014	33	72	—	—	—	28	—
2015	34	47	—	—	53	19	—
2016	35	104	—	—	—	37	—

=== Top ten finishes ===
- 1 win – (1 DH)
- 4 podiums – (4 DH)

Season	Date	Location	Discipline	Place
2003	7 Dec 2002	Beaver Creek, USA	Downhill	6th
2007	1 Dec 2006	Beaver Creek, USA	Downhill	10th
2007	16 Dec 2006	Val Gardena, Italy	Downhill	4th
2008	24 Nov 2007	Lake Louise, Canada	Downhill	2nd
2008	13 Jan 2008	Wengen, Switzerland	Downhill	7th
2008	18 Jan 2008	Kitzbühel, Austria	Super-G	10th
2008	19 Jan 2008	Kitzbühel, Austria	Downhill	6th
2008	26 Jan 2008	Chamonix, France	Downhill	1st
2009	30 Nov 2008	Lake Louise, Canada	Super G	5th
2009	19 Dec 2008	Val Gardena, Italy	Super G	5th
2009	20 Dec 2008	Val Gardena, Italy	Super G	4th
2009	17 Jan 2009	Wengen, Switzerland	Downhill	3rd
2013	24 Nov 2012	Lake Louise, Canada	Downhill	3rd

== World Championship results ==
Year	Age	Slalom	Giant Slalom	Super G	Downhill	Combined
2003	22	—	—	17	24	—
2005	24	injured – did not compete				
2007	26	—	—	—	28	—
2009	28	—	—	DNF	25	—
2011	30	injured – did not compete				
2013	32	—	—	—	DNF	—

Sullivan took a bronze medal at the Junior World Championships in 2000 in the slalom. He first raced in the World Championships in 2003 and finished 17th in the Super-G and 24th in the Downhill. He missed the 2005 and 2011 events due to injury.

== Olympic results ==
Year	Age	Slalom	Giant Slalom	Super G	Downhill	Combined
2002	21	—	—	DNF	9	—
2006	25	—	—	—	DNS	—
2010	29	—	—	23	DSQ	—
2014	33	—	—	—	30	—

In his Olympic debut in the downhill in 2002, Sullivan finished a surprising ninth on the Grizzly course at Snowbasin, Utah. He was the 31st racer out of the starting gate and was the sole North American among the top fifteen finishers.

== U.S. Ski Championships ==
Sullivan was the Downhill champion at the U.S. Alpine Championships in 2007 in the Alyeska Resort in Alaska; he finished more than a full second ahead of runner-up Erik Fisher. He won three national titles in total, having previously won the super-G at Squaw Valley in 2002 and going on to win another downhill championship at Alyeska in 2009.

== Arctic Man ==
Sullivan and his partner Tyler Akelstad are five-time champions in the extreme ski/snowmachine race in Alaska - Arctic Man. Sullivan and Akelstad hold the record for the men's ski division, having completed the race with a time of 03:52.72. This was the first time that the four minute threshold was broken.

== Movies ==
- The People vs. Brad Holmes, 2007.
- Appeared in Children of Winter with fellow Olympian Seth Wescott skiing in Cordova, Alaska, at Points North Heli in 2009.
- Appeared in the Kings and Corn segment of Warren Miller's Flow State in 2012 alongside fellow Olympians Daron Rahlves and Tommy Moe.

== SKI Magazine column ==
During the 2012 season, Sullivan has written columns for SKI mag.com, giving insight to life on the World Cup circuit, which includes spending Christmas in Bormio.
