= Sami Uotila (skier) =

Finnish alpine skier (born 1976)

Sami Uotila (born 2 November 1976 in Helsinki) is a Finnish former alpine skier who competed in the 1998 Winter Olympics and 2002 Winter Olympics.
