= Alessandro Roberto =

Italian alpine skier (born 1977)

Personal information
- Born: 22 May 1977 (age 49) Merano, Italy

Skiing career
- Sport: Alpine skiing
- Retired: 2009
- Disciplines: Speed events and giant slalom
- World Cup debut: 2002

World Cup
- Seasons: 8
- Podiums: 0

Alessandro Roberto (born 22 May 1977) is an Italian former alpine skier who competed predominantly in the giant slalom discipline between 1995 and 2009.

== Career ==
He began to compete in International Ski Federation sanctioned events in 1995.

He competed at the 2001 FIS World Alpine Ski Championships finishing in 13th position in the giant slalom. Roberto went on to qualify for the 2002 Winter Olympics. There he finished in 22nd position in the giant slalom. He continued to ski competitively until 2009.
