= Pavel Shestakov =

Russian alpine skier (born 1980)

Pavel Sergeyevich Shestakov (Павел Сергеевич Шестаков; born 30 November 1980 in Krasnoyarsk, Soviet Union) is a Russian former alpine skier who competed in the 2002 Winter Olympics and 2006 Winter Olympics.
