= Jernej Reberšak =

Slovenian alpine skier (born 1977)

Jernej Reberšak (born 1977) is a retired Slovenian alpine skier.

At the 1999 Winter Universiade he won the bronze medals in both giant slalom and super-G.

He made his World Cup debut in November 1998 in Aspen. He collected his first World Cup points with a 30th place in March 2000 in Kvitfjell. At the start of the 2000–01 season he improved to a 21st place, then an 18th place in December 2000 in Val d'Isere. At the season closer in Kvitfjell, he improved further to a 17th place. At the 2001 World Championships he finished 22nd in both giant slalom and super-G. His last World Cup outing came in January 2004 in Kitzbühel.

He represented the sports club SK Radovljica.
