= Patrick Wirth =

Austrian alpine skier

Personal information
- Born: 17 September 1971 (age 54) Bezau, Austria

Skiing career
- Sport: Alpine skiing
- Retired: 2001
- Disciplines: Speed events
- World Cup debut: 1992

World Cup
- Seasons: 10
- Podiums: 1
Medal record
Men's alpine skiing
Representing Austria
World Cup race podiums
Event	1st	2nd	3rd
Super-G	0	0	1

Patrick Wirth (born 17 September 1971) is a retired Austrian alpine skier.

He is the brother of the alpine skier Katja Wirth.

== Europa Cup results ==
Wirth has won two disciplines cups in the Europa Cup and finished two-time second and one third in the overall.

- FIS Alpine Ski Europa Cup
  - Super-G: 1999, 2000

== See also ==
- Austrian Alpine Ski Championships
- Skiing in Austria
