= Patrice Manuel =

French alpine skier (born 1974)

- Born: February 13, 1974 (age 52); Briançon, France
- Occupation: Skier
- Years active: 1995–2002
- Height: 5 ft 5 in (170 cm)

Patrice Manuel (born February 13, 1974) is a retired French alpine skier.

He competed in two events at the 1993 Junior World Championships, recording 13th and 8th places. He made his World Cup debut in January 1995 in Kranjska Gora and competed extensively until 2002.

He collected his first World Cup points with a 26th place in February 1995 in Furano, and improved to 25th place within the end of the year, in December 1995 in Val d'Isere. Manuel later reached 23rd place in November 1997 in Park City, in January 1998 in Adelboden and February 2000 in St. Anton before improving to 19th in the next race in St. Anton. This mark was also equalled twice, in November 2000 in Lake Louise and January 2001 in Kitzbühel. His last World Cup outing came in March 2002 in Kvitfjell.

He represented the club CSH Briancon.
