= Silvano Beltrametti =

Swiss alpine skier (born 1979)

Silvano Beltrametti (born 22 March 1979) is a former Swiss alpine skier, and was one of the young, promising downhill racers of Switzerland. Beltrametti is now unable to walk due to vertebral column injuries suffered in a World Cup racing accident on December 8, 2001, in Val d'Isère. His accident led to the introduction of the blue lines in ski competitions, which lead the way to the next poles.
