= Raphaël Burtin =

French alpine skier (born 1977)

Raphaël Burtin (born 9 February 1977 in Bonneville, Haute-Savoie) is a French former alpine skier who competed in the men's giant slalom at the 2006 Winter Olympics, finishing 21st.
