= Matteo Berbenni =

Italian alpine skier (born 1979)

Matteo Berbenni (born 1979) is a retired Italian alpine skier.

He won the downhill gold medal at the 1997 Junior World Championships, the silver medal in the same event at the 1998 Junior World Championships and the super-G bronze medal at the 1999 Junior World Championships.

He made his World Cup debut in March 1997 in Vail, also collecting his first World Cup points with a 24th place. In March 2001 he improved to a 23rd place in Kvitfjell, and continued achieving several top-30 finishes. His last World Cup outing came in January 2004 in Chamonix.
