= Vincent Millet =

French alpine skier (born 1973)

Vincent Millet (born 12 October 1973 in Tarbes) is a French retired alpine skier who competed in the men's giant slalom at the 2002 Winter Olympics.
