= Christian Greber =

Austrian alpine skier (born 1972)

Christian Greber (born 8 February 1972 in Mellau) is an Austrian former alpine skier who competed in the men's downhill at the 2002 Winter Olympics, finishing 6th.
