= Rolf von Weissenfluh =

Swiss alpine skier (born 1977)

Rolf von Weissenfluh (born 1977) is a retired Swiss alpine skier.

He competed in two events at the 1996 Junior World Championships, recording 7th and 17th places. He later competed five seasons on the World Cup circuit.

He made his World Cup debut in December 1999 in Val Gardena, collecting his first World Cup points with a 14th place. Rolf later improved to 8th place in December 2000 in Val d'Isere, and throughout 2001 he was mostly a stable top-20 racer. His last top 20 placement came in February 2003 in Garmisch-Partenkirchen, and his last World Cup outing came in March 2004 in Kvitfjell.

He represented the sports club in Innertkirchen.
