= Chad Fleischer =

American alpine skier (born 1972)

Chad Fleischer (born January 4, 1972, in Columbus, Nebraska) is an American former alpine skier who competed in the 1994 Winter Olympics and 1998 Winter Olympics. Fleischer is a 10-year veteran of the Men's US Alpine Ski Team, Two Time National DH skiing Champion, named to Five World Championship Teams and Three Olympics Teams (could not compete in 2002 Salt Lake Olympics due to dislocated right knee in Wengen SUI three weeks prior to the Games). His best performance came in 1999 at the World Cup Finals, where he won a Silver Medal behind Lasse Kjus of Norway. Fleischer now owns and operates a chain of ski rental and retail stores in Steamboat Springs, Colorado. His wife Renée is a former San Diego Charger cheerleader and Denver Bronco cheerleader. They were married May 2000 in Maui, Hawaii.
