= Nicolas Burtin =

French alpine skier

Nicolas Burtin (born 15 January 1972 in Bonneville, Haute-Savoie) is a former French Alpine skier. Burtin was a member of the French national team from 1992, and took part in 98 World Cup races in his career, of which 84 were downhill, 13 Super-G plus one giant slalom. He also competed at the 1994 Winter Olympics and the 1998 Winter Olympics.

The only victory of his career came in March 1998, when he finished first in the downhill at Kvitfjell. He also had three second-places. At the Winter Olympics at Kvitfjell in 1994 he came in seventh place. He took part in his last race in January 2006.

Nicolas' younger brother, Raphaël, is also a French national team Alpine skier.

== World Cup wins ==
| Date | Place | Discipline |
|---|---|---|
| 7 March 1998 | Norway Kvitfjell | Downhill |
