= Ivan Bormolini =

Italian alpine skier (born 1972)

- Born: 1972 (age 53–54)
- Occupation: Alpine Skier

Ivan Bormolini (born 1972) is a retired Italian alpine skier.

He competed in two events at the 1990 Junior World Championships, managing a 7th place. At the 1991 Junior World Championships he participated in all five events, winning the silver medal in combined and the gold medal in downhill.

He made his World Cup debut in October 1993 in Sölden, also collecting his first World Cup points with a 13th-place finish. In the 1994-95 FIS Alpine Ski World Cup he stabilized himself in the top 25, and continued this form in 1995-96, albeit starting more rarely. After several years, he improved his best placement to 12th in January 1999 in Kranjska Gora. His last World Cup was a 20th place in the super-G in January 2001 in Garmisch-Partenkirchen.

His best placements came at the World Championships, with 11th and 12th places at the 1997 World Championships, a 10th place at the 1999 World Championships and finally a 25th place at the 2001 World Championships.
