= Patrick Staudacher =

Italian alpine skier (born 1980)

Personal information
- Born: 29 April 1980 (age 46) Sterzing, Italy

Skiing career
- Sport: Alpine skiing
- Retired: 2013
- Disciplines: Speed events
- World Cup debut: 1996

Olympics
- Teams: 3
- Medals: 0

World Championships
- Teams: 2
- Medals: 1 (1 gold)

World Cup
- Seasons: 18
- Wins: 0
- Podiums: 1
Medal record
World Championships
Gold medal – first place	2007 Åre	Super-G

Patrick Staudacher (born 29 April 1980) is a former Italian alpine skier.

== Career ==
He won the super-G gold medal at the 2007 World Championships in Åre.

== National titles ==
Staudacher has won six national titles.

- Italian Alpine Ski Championships
  - Downhill: 2010 (1)
  - Super-G: 2001, 2005, 2010 (3)
  - Combined: 2001 (1)
