= Peter Rzehak =

Austrian alpine skier (born 1970)

Peter Rzehak (born 8 February 1970) is an Austrian former alpine skier.
