= Thomas Vonn =

American alpine skier

- Born: December 3, 1975 (age 50); New York City, New York
- Education: St. Lawrence University
- Occupation: Alpine skier
- Years active: 1999 – 2005
- Height: 6 ft 0 in (183 cm)
- Spouse: Lindsey Vonn (m. 2007; div. 2013)
- Children: 2

Thomas Vonn (born December 3, 1975) is an American former alpine ski racer with the U.S. Ski Team.

== Biography ==
Vonn, who is of German descent, graduated from St. Lawrence University in Canton, New York, in 2001.

Primarily a giant slalom racer, Vonn's best finish in international competition was in the Super-G at the 2002 Winter Olympics, where he placed ninth. He was then-wife Lindsey Vonn's coach when she won gold at the 2010 Winter Olympics in Vancouver. He also coached Dean Travers, beginning in 2015.

He returned to the Lake Placid area in 2018 as a high school and New York Ski Educational Foundation coach.

== Personal life ==
He married fellow ski racer Lindsey Kildow on September 29, 2007, at the Silver Lake Lodge in Deer Valley, Utah after proposing to her the prior New Years' Eve in Austria. They filed for divorce in November 2011; it was finalized on January 9, 2013.

After divorcing Lindsey Vonn, Thomas Vonn began a relationship with Shauna Kane. Kane gave birth to their first son in 2018. A second son was born in 2020.
