= Erik Seletto =

Italian alpine skier (born 1975)

Personal information
- Born: 21 September 1975 (age 50) Aosta, Italy

Skiing career
- Sport: Alpine skiing
- Retired: 2004
- Disciplines: Speed events
- World Cup debut: 1993

Olympics
- Teams: 1
- Medals: 0

World Championships
- Teams: 4
- Medals: 0

World Cup
- Seasons: 12
- Podiums: 1

Erik Seletto (born 21 September 1975) is an Italian former alpine skier who competed in the 1998 Winter Olympics.

== National titles ==
Seletto has won two national titles.

- Italian Alpine Ski Championships
  - Downhill: 1997
  - Super-G: 2003
