= Luca Cattaneo =

Italian alpine skier (born 1972)

Personal information
- Nationality: Italian
- Born: July 24, 1972 (age 54)

Sport
- Sport: Alpine skiing

Achievements and titles
- Olympic finals: 1998 Winter Olympics

Luca Cattaneo (born 24 July 1972) is an Italian former alpine skier who competed in the 1998 Winter Olympics where he did not win a medal.
