= Lorenzo Galli =

Italian alpine skier (born 1979)

Lorenzo Galli (born 1979) is a retired Italian alpine skier.

== Career ==
He made his World Cup debut in January 1997 in Chamonix, later collecting his first World Cup points with a 25th place in February 1997 in Garmisch-Partenkirchen. He later tied this career best, before also improving to a 19th place in December 1998 in Val d'Isere. In the 1999–2000 season he also tied this, in January 2000 in Wengen, before improving to 17th in March 2000 in Kvitfjell, then 15th in December 2000 in Val d'Isere. His last World Cup outing came in January 2003 in Kitzbühel.
