= Jakub Fiala =

American alpine skier (born 1975)

Jakub Fiala (born 24 May 1975 in Prague) is a former alpine skier who competed in the 1999 Alpine Skiing World Championships in Vail, Colorado and in 2002 Winter Olympics with an American license.
