= Lasse Paulsen =

Norwegian alpine skier (born 1974)

Lasse Paulsen (born 1974) is a retired Norwegian alpine skier.

Competing at the 1993 Junior World Championships, he finished lowly. He later finished 27th in super-G at the 1999 World Championships and 16th in the giant slalom at the 2001 World Championships.

He made his World Cup debut in December 1995 in Bormio, also collecting his first World Cup points with a 20th place. Later that season he improved to 18th place in a February 1997 super-G in Garmisch-Partenkirchen. He mostly finished in the 20th–30th range until improving to 13th place in December 1998, in both Val d'Isere and Val Gardena—then a 10th place in Innsbruck. He thereafter finished mostly in the 15th–35th range. At the onset of the 2002–03 season, his results declined, and his last World Cup outing came in December 2002 in Val Gardena.

He represented the sports club Narvik SK.
