= Gregor Šparovec =

Slovenian alpine skier (born 1977)

Gregor Šparovec (born 29 December 1977 in Jesenice) is a Slovenian former alpine skier who competed in the 2002 Winter Olympics.
