= Stefan Stankalla =

German alpine skier (born 1979)

Stefan Stankalla (born 1979) is a retired German alpine skier.

He competed in two events at the 1993 Junior World Championships and three at the 1994 Junior World Championships, winning the gold medal in giant slalom at the latter event. He later competed in two to three events at the 1996, 1999, 2001 and 2003 World Championships, with a 20th place from 1999 as his highest achievement.

He made his World Cup debut in March 1994 in Vail, also collecting his first World Cup points with an 18th place. He later improved to an 11th place in January 1999 in Schladming. In January 2001 in Garmisch-Partenkirchen, he managed to finish 9th in downhill and 5th in super-G. His last World Cup outing came in March 2004 in Kvitfjell.

He represented the sports club SC Partenkirchen.
