= Peter Pen =

Slovenian alpine skier (born 1972)

Peter Pen (born 14 June 1972 in Maribor) is a Slovenian former alpine skier who competed in the 1998 Winter Olympics and 2002 Winter Olympics.
