= Darin McBeath =

Canadian alpine skier (born 1976)

Darin McBeath (born 17 June 1976) is a Canadian former alpine skier who competed in the 2002 Winter Olympics.
