= Max Rauffer =

German alpine skier (born 1972)

Max Rauffer (born 8 May 1972 in Kolbermoor) is a German former alpine skier who competed in the 2002 Winter Olympics, finishing 34th in the men's downhill and 22nd in the men's Super-G.
