= Bruno Kernen (born 1972) =

Swiss alpine skier

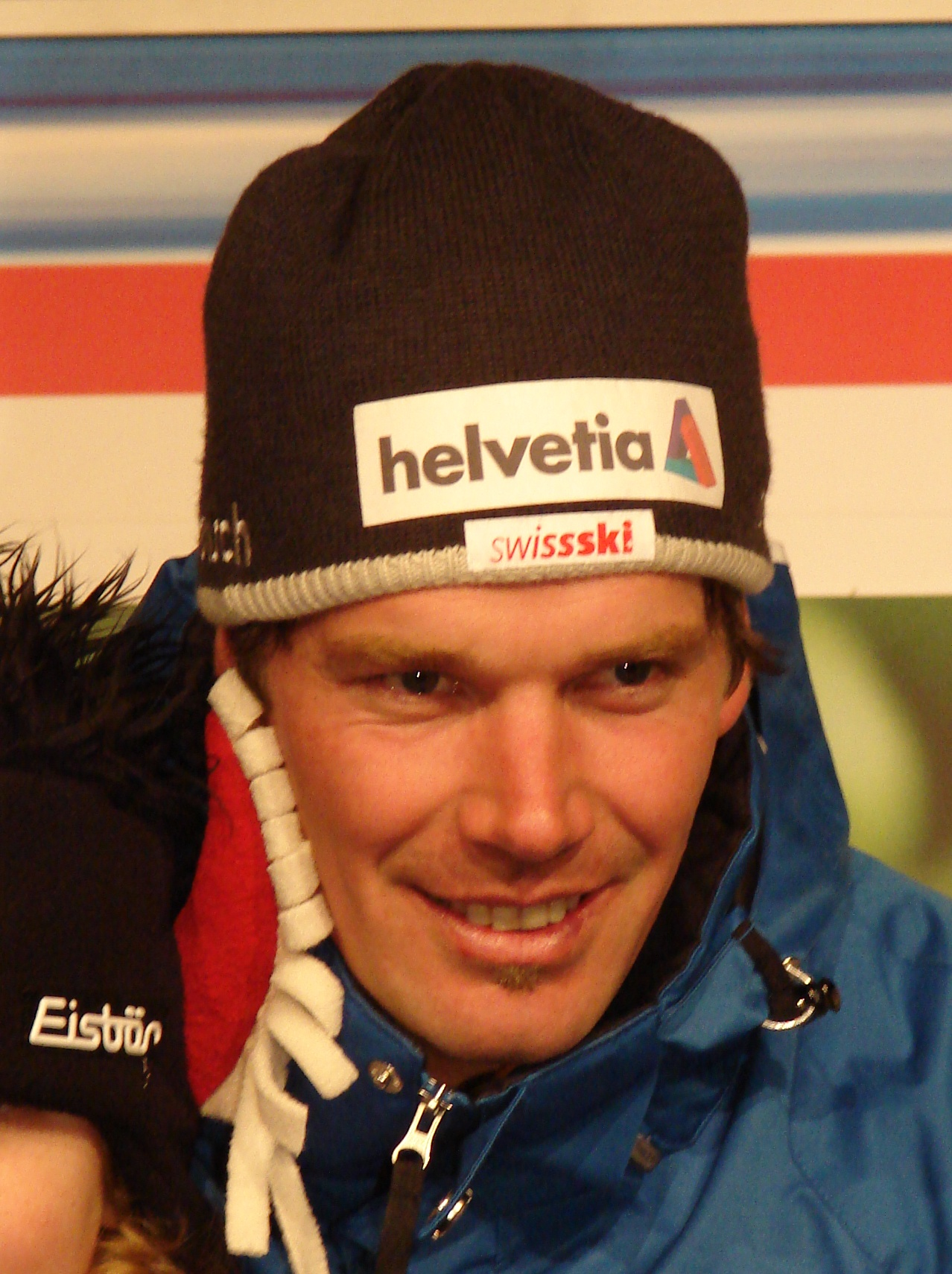
- Kernen in December 2006

Personal information
- Born: 1 July 1972 (age 54) Thun, Bern, Switzerland
- Website: bruno-kernen.com
Medal record
Men's alpine skiing
Representing Switzerland
Olympic Games
| Bronze medal – third place | 2006 Turin | Downhill |
World Championships
| Gold medal – first place | 1997 Sestrière | Downhill |
| Silver medal – second place | 1997 Sestrière | Combined |
| Bronze medal – third place | 2003 St. Moritz | Downhill |
| Bronze medal – third place | 2007 Åre | Super-G |

Bruno Kernen (born 1 July 1972) is a Swiss former alpine skier. In 1997, he became world champion in downhill, as well as a silver medalist in combined. In 2003, he won bronze in downhill at the world championships in St. Moritz. He won the Lauberhorn downhill race in Wengen in 2003.

At the 2006 Winter Olympics in Turin, Kernen won a bronze medal in the downhill. He also raced in the super-G, where he placed 18th.

== World Cup victories ==
- 3 wins (3 DH)
- 7 podiums (4 DH, 3 K)

| Season | Date | Location | Discipline |
|---|---|---|---|
| 1996 | 19 Jan 1996 | Veysonnaz, Switzerland | Downhill |
| 1996 | 20 Jan 1996 | Veysonnaz, Switzerland | Downhill |
| 2003 | 18 Jan 2003 | Wengen, Switzerland | Downhill |
