= Kurt Sulzenbacher =

Italian alpine skier (born 1976)

Personal information
- Born: 29 October 1967 (age 58) Innichen, Italy

Skiing career
- Sport: Alpine skiing
- Club: C.S. Carabinieri
- Retired: 2009
- Disciplines: Technical events
- World Cup debut: 2002

Olympics
- Teams: 2

World Championships
- Teams: 3

World Cup
- Seasons: 8
- Podiums: 2
Medal record
Men's alpine skiing
Representing Italy
World Cup race podiums: Event / 1st / 2nd / 3rd; Downhill / 0 / 1 / 1
Junior World Championships
Gold medal – first place	1995 Voss	Downhill

Kurt Sulzenbacher (born 29 October 1976) is an Italian former alpine skier who competed in the 2002 Winter Olympics and 2006 Winter Olympics.

== Career ==
During his career he has achieved two results among the top 3 in the World Cup.

== World Cup results ==
Top 3

Date	Place	Discipline	Rank
14-12-2001	(Italy) Val Gardena	Downhill	3
08-12-2001	(France) Val d'Isere	Downhill	2

== National titles ==
Sulzenbacher has won one national championships at individual senior level.

- Italian Alpine Ski Championships
  - Downhill: 2003
