= Jernej Koblar =

Slovenian alpine skier (born 1971)

Jernej Koblar (born 30 September 1971 in Jesenice) is a Slovenian former alpine skier. He competed in the 1994 Winter Olympics, 1998 Winter Olympics, and 2002 Winter Olympics. He is the husband of the former biathlete Andreja Koblar. He has since worked as a coach for the Slovenian women's skiing team.
