= Bjarne Solbakken =

Norwegian alpine skier (born 1977)

Personal information
- Born: 18 May 1977 (age 48) Stranda Municipality, Norway

Sport
- Sport: Alpine skiing
- Club: Stranda IL

Achievements and titles
- National finals: 3 victories (2000, 2001, 2004)

Bjarne Solbakken (born 18 May 1977) is a retired Norwegian alpine skier from Stranda Municipality. He won three national titles in giant slalom, and competed at the Olympics, World Championships and the World Cup.

== Skiing Career ==
=== Olympics ===
Solbakken participated at the 2002 Winter Olympics in Salt Lake City, where he finished fifth in super-G, sixth in giant slalom and twelfth in downhill. At the 2006 Winter Olympics in Turin he competed in downhill, super-G and giant slalom, with a twentieth place in giant slalom as best result.

=== World championships ===
At the FIS Alpine World Ski Championships 2007 he competed in super-G, downhill and giant slalom.

=== World Cup ===
He participated in the Alpine skiing World Cup in 2003/2004, 2004/2005 and 2005/2006. His best result was at the 2004 Alpine Skiing World Cup, when he finished fourth overall in super-G, with one victory, in Beaver Creek, and one second place at Kvitfjell. He left in the summer of 2008 to pursue studies.

=== National titles ===
Solbakken won three national titles in giant slalom, in 2000, 2001, and 2004.
