= Didier Défago =

Swiss alpine skier

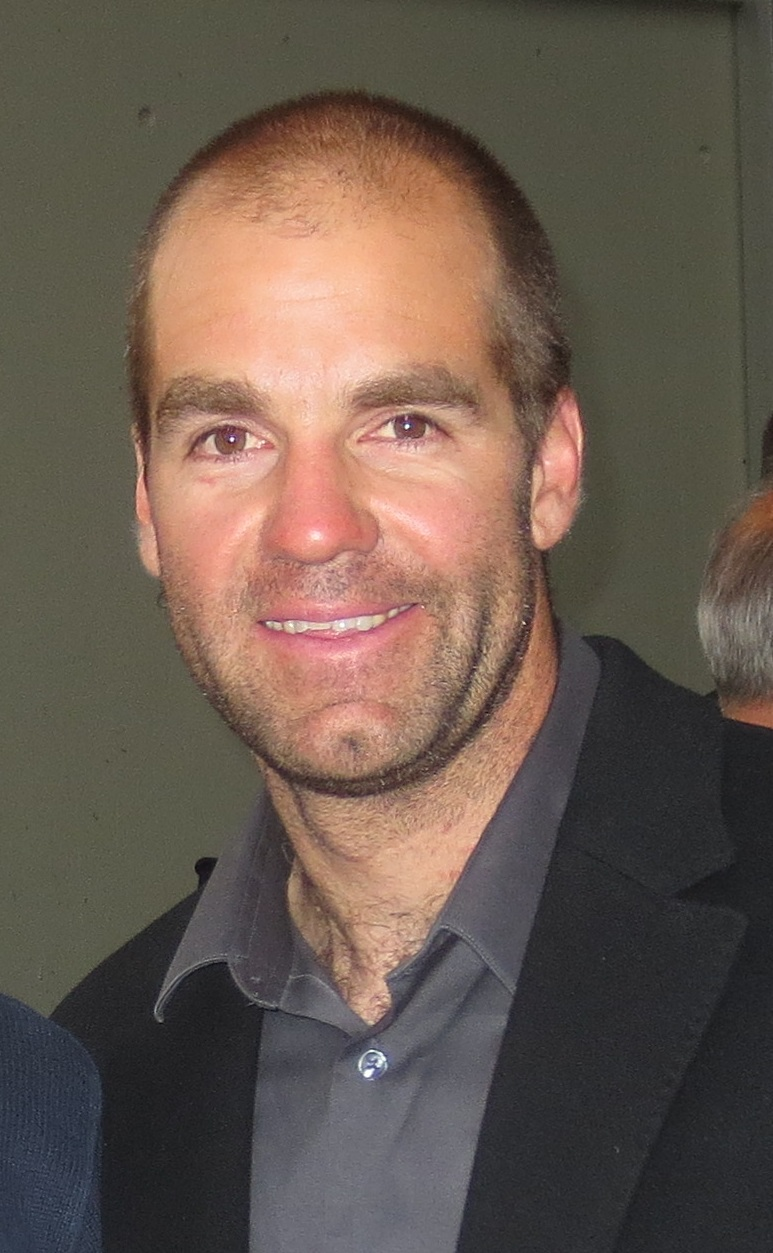
- Défago in 2014

Personal information
- Born: 2 October 1977 (age 48) Morgins, Valais, Switzerland
- Height: 1.84 m (6 ft 0 in)
- Website: DidierDefago.ch

Skiing career
- Sport: Alpine skiing
- Retired: 18 March 2015 (age 37)
- Disciplines: Downhill, Super G giant slalom, combined
- World Cup debut: 7 March 1996 (age 18)

Olympics
- Teams: 4 – (2002–2014)
- Medals: 1 (1 gold)

World Championships
- Teams: 7 – (2001–09, '13–15)
- Medals: 0

World Cup
- Wins: 5 – (3 DH, 2 SG)
- Podiums: 16
- Overall titles: 0 – (6th in 2005, 2009)
- Discipline titles: 0 – (3rd in DH, SG; 2009)
Medal record
Men's alpine skiing
Representing Switzerland
Olympic Games
Gold medal – first place	2010 Vancouver	Downhill

Didier Défago (born 2 October 1977) is a Swiss retired World Cup alpine ski racer.

Born in Morgins, Valais, Défago made his World Cup debut at age 18 in March 1996, and was Swiss national champion in downhill (2003) and giant slalom (2004). At the 2010 Winter Olympics, he won the downhill at Whistler to become the Olympic champion.

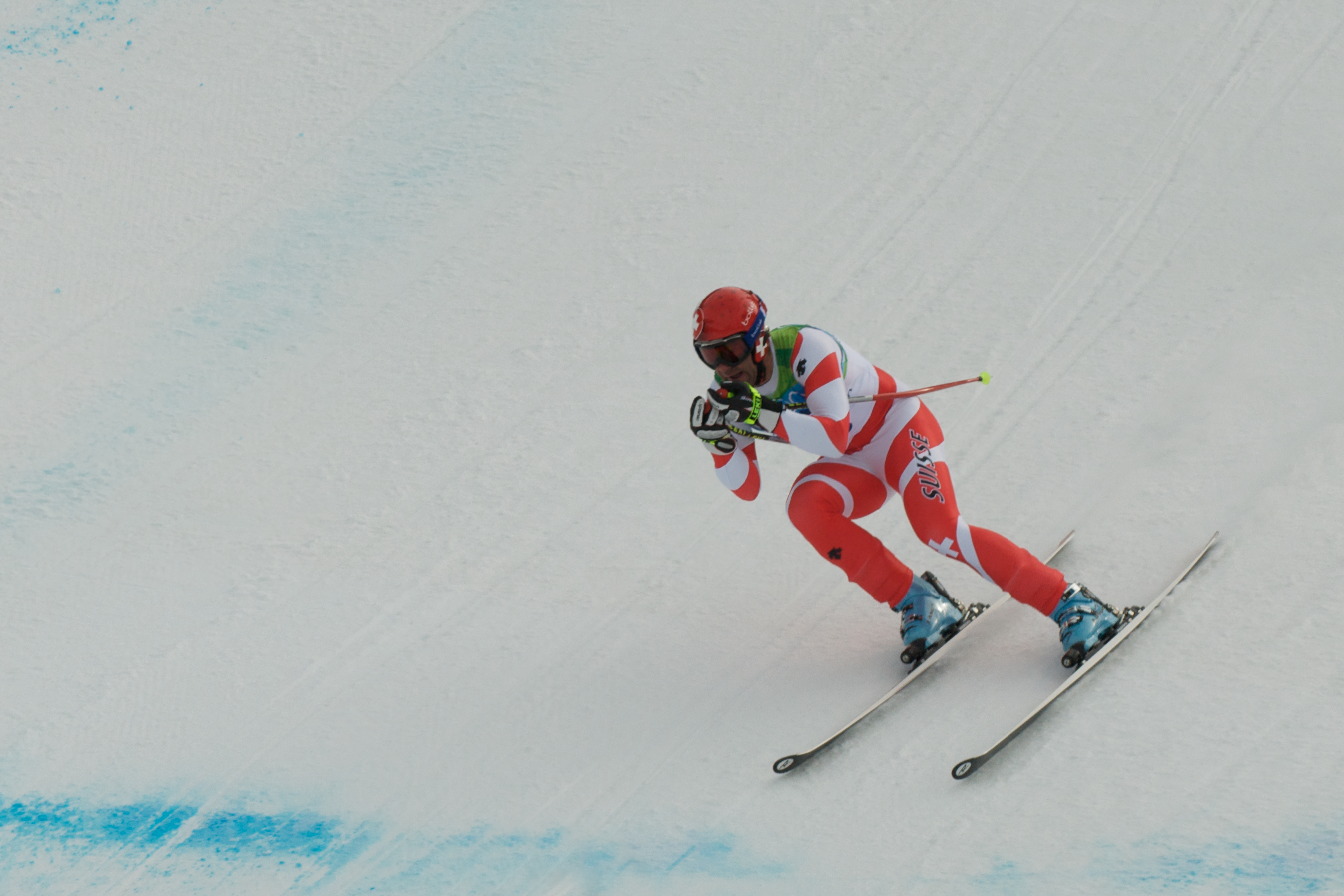
Didier Défago winning gold at the 2010 Winter Olympics

Défago finished the 2005 World Cup season as sixth overall and fourth in the Super-G, his most successful season so far. In 2009 he won two downhill races in a row, the classics at Wengen and Kitzbühel. He was the first to win these in consecutive weeks since Stephan Eberharter in 2002, and the first Swiss racer since Franz Heinzer in 1992.

While training on a glacier above Zermatt in mid-September 2010, Defago fell and injured ligaments in his left knee, ending his 2011 season.

Défago announced his retirement in March 2015, after a second-place finish at the World Cup finals in the downhill in Méribel, France, and had his final World Cup race the next day in the super-G.

== World Cup results ==
=== Season standings ===
Season	Age	Overall	Slalom	Giant slalom	Super-G	Downhill	Combined
1996	18	126	—	—	38	—	—
1997	19	injured					
1998	20	138	—	54	—	—	—
1999	21	93	—	—	29	—	—
2000	22	27	—	15	16	39	—
2001	23	24	—	23	13	17	—
2002	24	14	—	13	7	34	7
2003	25	11	53	11	7	18	7
2004	26	32	—	31	26	21	13
2005	27	6	—	14	4	15	3
2006	28	15	52	21	22	9	9
2007	29	14	61	9	14	21	15
2008	30	9	—	18	4	9	21
2009	31	6	—	20	3	3	20
2010	32	12	—	28	12	8	8
2011	33	injured					
2012	34	18	—	17	19	13	23
2013	35	30	—	19	26	29	—
2014	36	19	—	36	6	16	—
2015	37	18	—	—	7	13	—

=== Race podiums ===
- 5 wins – (3 DH, 2 SG)
- 16 podiums – (5 DH, 7 SG, 3 AC, 1 GS)

Season	Date	Location	Discipline	Place
2002	03 Mar 2002	Kvitfjell, Norway	Super-G	2nd
2003	20 Dec 2002	Val Gardena, Italy	Super-G	1st
2003	26 Jan 2003	Kitzbühel, Austria	Combined	3rd
2005	14 Jan 2005	Wengen, Switzerland	Super combined	3rd
2005	20 Feb 2005	Garmisch, Germany	Super-G	2nd
2005	06 Mar 2005	Kvitfjell, Norway	Super-G	2nd
2007	17 Dec 2006	Alta Badia, Italy	Giant slalom	3rd
2008	13 Mar 2008	Bormio, Italy	Super-G	2nd
2009	19 Dec 2008	Val Gardena, Italy	Super-G	2nd
2009	17 Jan 2009	Wengen, Switzerland	Downhill	1st
2009	24 Jan 2009	Kitzbühel, Austria	Downhill	1st
2010	04 Dec 2009	Beaver Creek, United States	Super Combined	2nd
2010	29 Dec 2009	Bormio, Italy	Downhill	2nd
2012	29 Dec 2011	Bormio, Italy	Downhill	1st
2014	26 Jan 2014	Kitzbühel, Austria	Super-G	1st
2015	18 Mar 2015	Méribel, France	Downhill	2nd

== World Championship results ==
Year	Age	Slalom	Giant slalom	Super-G	Downhill	Combined
2001	23	—	—	11	—	—
2003	25	—	22	21	—	7
2005	27	—	12	7	6	14
2007	29	—	13	17	10	4
2009	31	—	20	8	DNF	—
2011	33	injured				
2013	35	—	DNF2	26	8	—
2015	37	—	—	7	11	—

== Olympic results ==
Year	Age	Slalom	Giant slalom	Super-G	Downhill	Combined
2002	24	—	14	6	21	DNF2
2006	28	—	14	16	26	DNF2
2010	32	—	—	15	1	DNF2
2014	36	—	DNF1	DNF	14	—
