= Sébastien Fournier-Bidoz =

French alpine skier (born 1976)

Sébastien Fournier-Bidoz (born 2 April 1976 in Bonneville, Haute-Savoie) is a retired French alpine skier who competed in the 2002 Winter Olympics.
