= Christophe Saioni =

French alpine skier (born 1969)

Christophe Saioni (born 1 February 1969) is a French former alpine skier who competed in the 1998 Winter Olympics and 2002 Winter Olympics. His wife is Maruša Ferk Saioni.
