= Roland Fischnaller (alpine skier) =

Italian alpine skier (born 1975)

- Born: 14 June 1975 (age 51); Bruneck
- Occupation: Alpine skier

Roland Fischnaller (born 14 June 1975 in Villnöß) is an Italian former alpine skier who competed in the 2002 Winter Olympics.
