= Kenneth Sivertsen (skier) =

Norwegian alpine skier (born 1973)

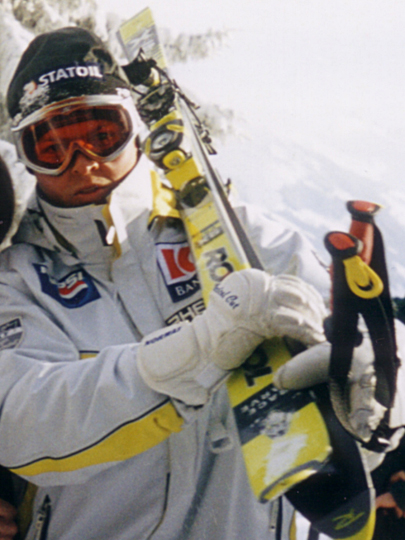
Kenneth Sivertsen in 2000

Kenneth Sivertsen (born 31 August 1973) is a Norwegian alpine skier, born in Narvik. He competed in the downhill, giant slalom and Super-G at the Winter Olympics in Salt Lake City in 2002.

Sivertsen was Norwegian champion in alpine combined in 1996, and in downhill in 1999.
