= Pierre-Emmanuel Dalcin =

French alpine skier (born 1977)

Personal information
- Born: February 15, 1977 (age 49) Saint-Jean-de-Maurienne, Savoie, France
- Height: 183 cm (6 ft 0 in)

Skiing career
- Sport: Alpine skiing
- Club: Val Cenis
- Disciplines: Downhill, Super-G
- World Cup debut: January 23, 1998 (age 20)

Olympics
- Teams: 2

World Championships
- Teams: 2

World Cup
- Seasons: 11
- Wins: 1
- Podiums: 2

Pierre-Emmanuel Dalcin (born 15 February 1977 in Saint-Jean-de-Maurienne, Savoie) is a French Alpine skier.

Dalcin was French Champion in Downhill 2000. At the 2006 Winter Olympics, Dalcin was leading the Super-G competition before it was stopped. In the second run, he was disqualified.

== Results ==
=== Winter Olympics ===
- 2002 in Salt Lake City, USA
  - Downhill: 11º
- 2006 in Turin, Italy
  - Downhill: 11º

=== Worldwide Competitions ===
- 2001 in Sankt Anton am Arlberg, Austria
  - Super Giant: 9º
  - Downhill: 15º
- 2003 in St. Moritz, Switzerland
  - Downhill: 15º
- 2005 in Bormio, Italy
  - Downhill: 31º
  - Super Giant: 32º
- 2007 in Åre, Sweden
  - Downhill: 19º
- 2009 in Val d'Isère, France
  - Downhill: 18º
  - Super Giant: 22º

=== World Cup ===
==== General Classification - World Cup ====
- 1999-2000: 87º
- 2000-2001: 55º
- 2001-2002: 36º
- 2002-2003: 62º
- 2003-2004: 58º
- 2004-2005: 100º
- 2005-2006: 77°
- 2006-2007: 35°
- 2007-2008: 85°
- 2008-2009: 85º
- 2009-2010: 141º

== World Cup victories ==
Season	Date	Location	Race
2007	January 20, 2007	Val d'Isere, France	Downhill
