= Josef Strobl =

Austrian alpine skier (born 1974)

Josef "Pepi" Strobl (born 3 March 1974 in Holzgau) is a former alpine skier from Austria.

== Career ==
During his career, he won three World Cup downhills (he gained much attention after winning his first ever World Cup downhill with start number 61), one giant slalom, two Super Gs and one parallel slalom. In the 1996/7 season he was the best placed Austrian in the overall World Cup.

From the 2004/5 season, until the end of his career in 2006, he competed for Slovenia, as he faced problems with qualifying within the extremely strong Austrian skiing team.

== World Cup victories ==
Datum	Ort	Land	Disziplin
16 December 1994	Val-d'Isère	France	Downhill
25 November 1996	Park City	United States	Giant Slalom
2 March 1997	Kvitfjell	Norway	Super-G
24 October 1997	Tignes	France	Parallel Slalom
13 March 1998	Crans-Montana	Switzerland	Downhill
15 January 2000	Wengen	Switzerland	Downhill
12 February 2000	St. Anton	Austria	Super-G
