= Claude Crétier =

French alpine skier (born 1977)

Claude Crétier (born 14 May 1977 in Bourg-Saint-Maurice) is a French former alpine skier who competed in the 2002 Winter Olympics.
