= Hans Knauß =

Austrian alpine skier (born 1971)

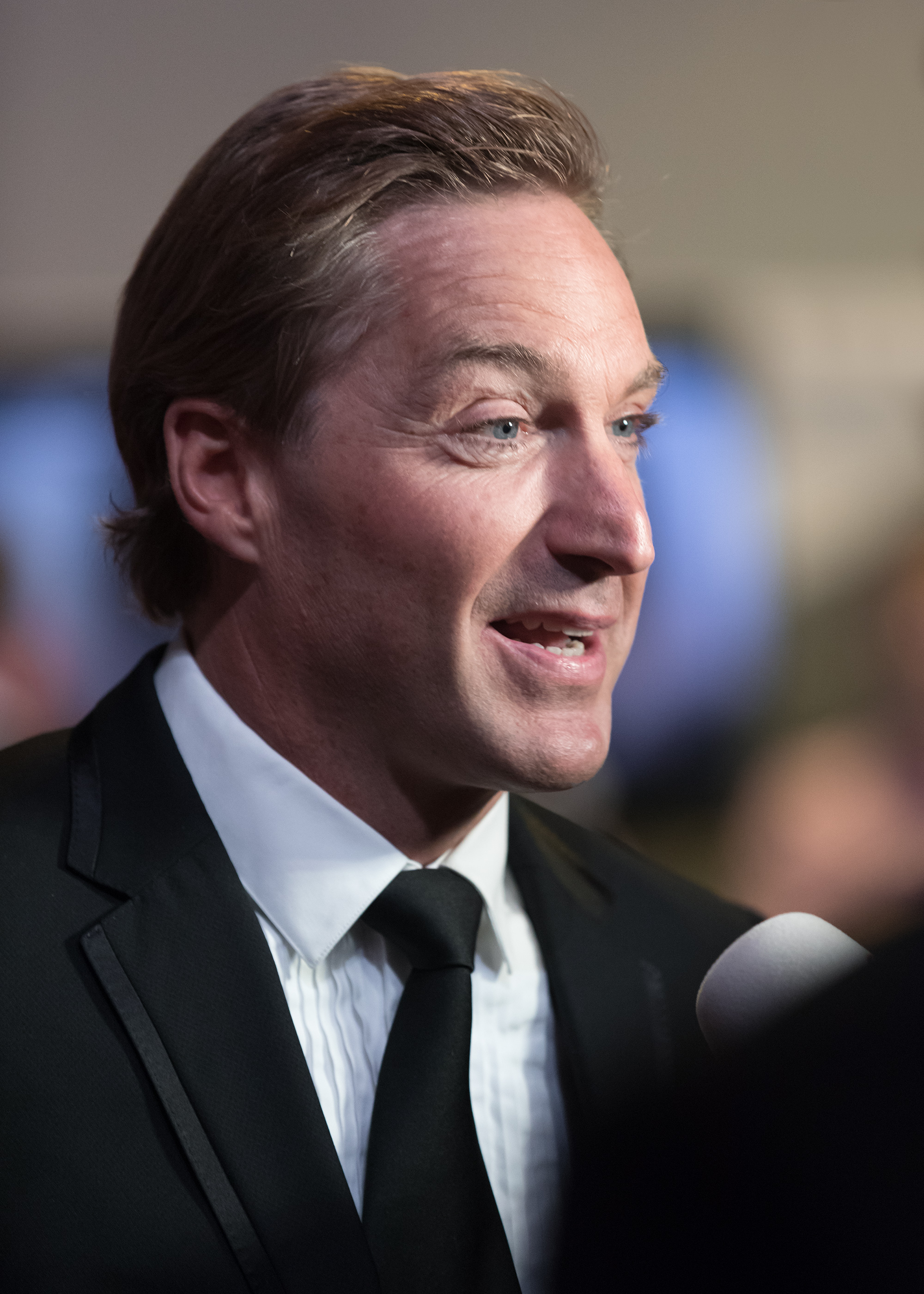

Medal record

Men's alpine skiing

Representing Austria

Olympic Games
Silver medal – second place	1998 Nagano	Super-G

World Championships
Silver medal – second place	2003 St. Moritz	Giant Slalom
Bronze medal – third place	1999 Vail	Super-G

Hans Knauß (born 9 February 1971 in Schladming) is an Austrian former alpine skier. He competed at the 1994, 1998 and 2002 Winter Olympics, winning a silver medal in the Super-G at the 1998 Nagano Olympics. Knauß tested positive for the anabolic steroid Nandrolone at a World Cup downhill in Canada on 27 November 2004 and was given an 18-month ban from sport.

== Doping ban ==
Knauß tested positive for the anabolic steroid Nandrolone at a World Cup downhill in Lake Louise in Canada on 27 November 2004 and was subsequently given an 18-month ban from sport. Knauß retired from the sport after the doping sanction.

== World Cup victories ==
Date	Location	Race
17 December 1995	(Italy) Alta Badia	Giant Slalom
23 January 1996	(France) Valloire	Super-G
16 December 1996	(France) Val-d'Isère	Super-G
8 March 1998	(Norway) Kvitfjell	Super-G
23 January 1999	(Austria) Kitzbühel	Downhill
14 January 2003	(Switzerland) Adelboden	Giant Slalom
15 March 2003	(Norway) Lillehammer	Giant Slalom
