= Stephan Eberharter =

Austrian alpine skier

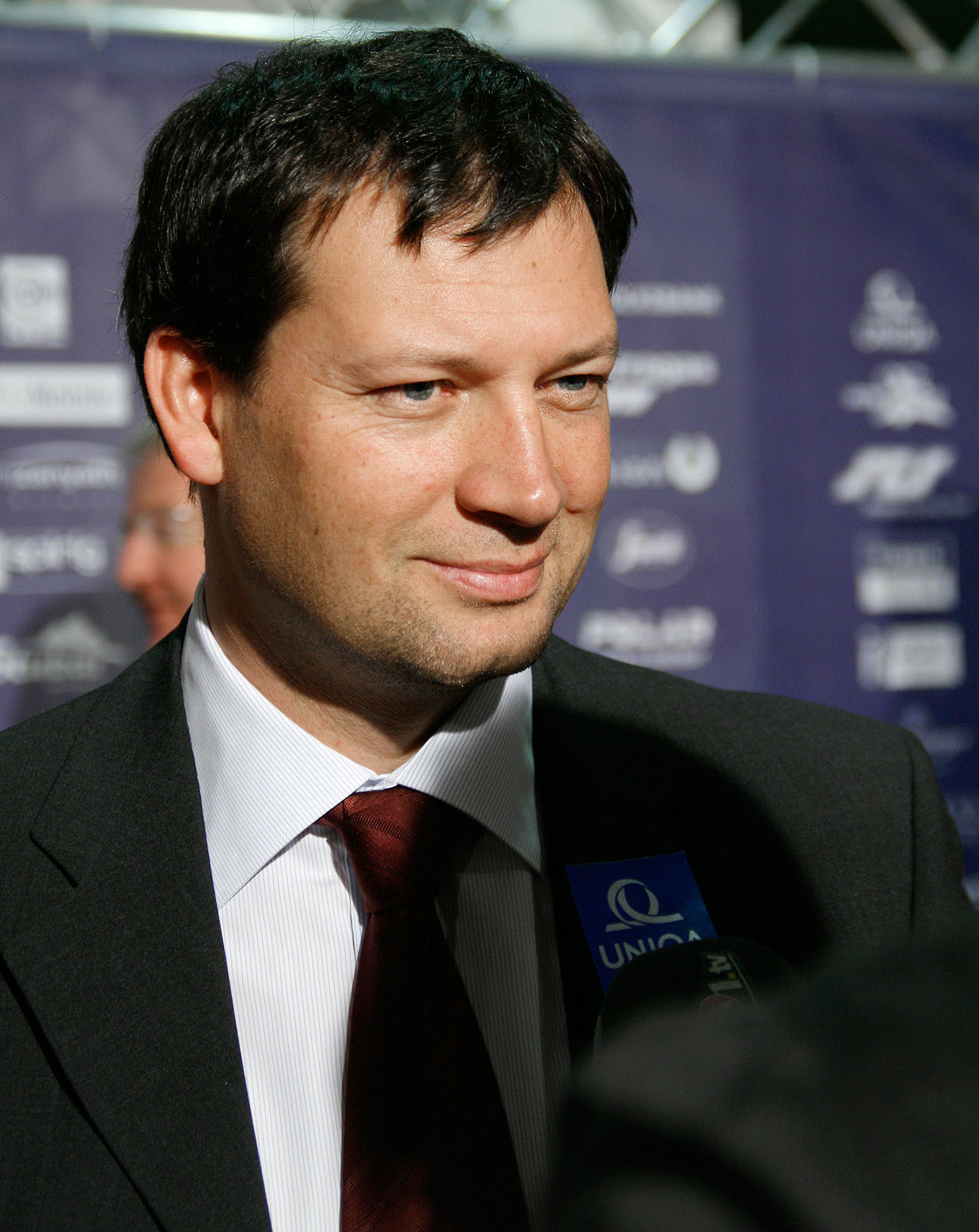

Personal information
- Born: 24 March 1969 (age 57) Brixlegg, Austria

Skiing career
- Sport: Alpine skiing

Olympics
- Medals: 4 (1 gold)

World Championships
- Medals: 4 (3 gold)

World Cup
- Wins: 29
- Podiums: 75
- Overall titles: 2
- Discipline titles: 5
Medal record
World Cup race podiums
Event	1st	2nd	3rd
Slalom	0	0	0
Giant	5	4	4
Super-G	6	9	9
Downhill	18	9	11
Combined	0	0	0
Parallel	0	0	0
Total	29	22	24
International alpine ski competitions
Event	1st	2nd	3rd
Olympic Games	1	2	1
World Championships	3	1	0
Total	4	3	1
Olympic Games
Gold medal – first place	2002 Salt Lake City	Giant slalom
Silver medal – second place	1998 Nagano	Giant slalom
Silver medal – second place	2002 Salt Lake City	Super-G
Bronze medal – third place	2002 Salt Lake City	Downhill
WorldChampionships
Gold medal – first place	1991 Saalbach	Super-G
Gold medal – first place	1991 Saalbach	Combined
Gold medal – first place	2003 St. Moritz	Super-G
Silver medal – second place	2001 St. Anton	Super-G

Stephan "Steff" Eberharter (born 24 March 1969) is a former World Cup alpine ski racer from Austria.

== Biography ==
Born in Brixlegg, Tyrol, Eberharter was the winner of the overall World Cup title in 2002 and 2003, as well as the season titles in downhill and super-G. He was the nearest rival of compatriot Hermann Maier in the late 1990s and early 2000s. Eberharter retired from international competition following the conclusion of the 2003–04 season.

== Career ==
Eberharter made his World Cup debut during the 1990 season at age 20, where he finished 32nd in the overall standings. The next year he finished second in the super-G standings and won two gold medals at the 1991 World Championships in Saalbach, the super-G and combined. He was voted the Austrian Sportspersonality of the year for 1991.

After injury setbacks, he became particularly successful in the downhill event, and finished third in the downhill standings in 1998 and was the runner-up in 2001. His nemesis on the snow, teammate Maier, was involved in a serious motorcycle accident in August 2001 which sidelined him for the 2002 season. In Maier's absence, Eberharter went on to take the overall World Cup title (and downhill and super-G) in 2002 and 2003. His 2004 victory at the Hahnenkamm downhill in Kitzbühel is often regarded as one of the most impressive downhill victories in alpine skiing history, besting runner-up Daron Rahlves by a lengthy 1.21 seconds, an equivalent of 142 feet (43 m) at 80 mph (130 km/h).

Eberharter enjoyed success at the World Championships and Olympic Games as well. In 1991 in Saalbach, he won two gold medals in the super-G and combined events. Twelve years later, at St. Moritz in 2003, he took gold in the super-G event again. At the 1998 Winter Olympics in Nagano, Japan, he finished second in the giant slalom, but went on to take gold in the same event at the 2002 Winter Olympics in Salt Lake City, where he also won the bronze medal in the downhill, and took silver in the super-G.

In his final season in 2004, Eberharter won four downhills and the downhill season title; he had twelve podiums, was second in the overall standings, and third in Super-G.

== World Cup results ==
=== Season titles ===
- 7 titles – (2 overall, 3 DH, 2 SG)

Season	Discipline
2002	Overall
2002	Downhill
2002	Super-G
2003	Overall
2003	Downhill
2003	Super-G
2004	Downhill

=== Season standings ===
Season	Age	Overall	Slalom	Giant slalom	Super-G	Downhill	Combined
1990	20	32	—	18	14	—	—
1991	21	12	—	7	2	—	5
1992	22	36	25	43	27	57	5
1993	23	29	33	42	12	50	10
1994	24						
1995	25	104	—	—	51	45	—
1996	26						
1997	27						
1998	28	3	—	4	3	3	9
1999	29	4	—	2	2	4	—
2000	30	6	—	16	7	6	9
2001	31	2	—	21	4	2	—
2002	32	1	—	3	1	1	–
2003	33	1	—	16	1	1	12
2004	34	2	—	29	3	1	22

=== Race victories ===
- 29 wins – (18 DH, 6 SG, 5 GS)
- 75 podiums – (38 DH, 24 SG, 13 GS)

Season	Date	Location	Discipline
1998	14 Mar 1998	Crans-Montana, Switzerland	Giant slalom
1999	20 Nov 1998	Park City, USA	Giant slalom
1999	27 Nov 1998	Aspen, USA	Super-G
1999	27 Feb 1999	Ofterschwang, Germany	Giant slalom
2001	25 Nov 2000	Lake Louise, Canada	Downhill
2001	3 Mar 2001	Kvitfjell, Norway	Downhill
2002	7 Dec 2001	Val-d'Isère, France	Super-G
2002	8 Dec 2001	Val-d'Isère, France	Downhill
2002	15 Dec 2001	Val Gardena, Italy	Downhill
2002	12 Jan 2002	Wengen, Switzerland	Downhill
2002	18 Jan 2002	Kitzbühel, Austria	Super-G
2002	19 Jan 2002	Kitzbühel, Austria	Downhill
2002	27 Jan 2002	Garmisch, Germany	Super-G
2002	2 Feb 2002	St. Moritz, Switzerland	Downhill
2002	3 Feb 2002	St. Moritz, Switzerland	Giant slalom
2002	6 Mar 2002	Altenmarkt, Austria	Downhill
2003	27 Oct 2002	Sölden, Austria	Giant slalom
2003	30 Nov 2002	Lake Louise, Canada	Downhill
2003	1 Dec 2002	Lake Louise, Canada	Super-G
2003	7 Dec 2002	Beaver Creek, USA	Downhill
2003	14 Dec 2002	Val-d'Isère, France	Downhill
2003	11 Jan 2003	Bormio, Italy	Downhill
2003	17 Jan 2003	Wengen, Switzerland	Downhill
2003	22 Feb 2003	Garmisch, Germany	Downhill
2003	13 Mar 2003	Kvitfjell, Norway	Super-G
2004	10 Jan 2004	Chamonix, France	Downhill
2004	24 Jan 2004	Kitzbühel, Austria	Downhill
2004	31 Jan 2004	Garmisch, Germany	Downhill
2004	6 Mar 2004	Kvitfjell, Norway	Downhill

== World Championship results ==
Year	Age	Slalom	Giant Slalom	Super G	Downhill	Combined
1991	21	—	—	1	—	1
1993	23	—	—	—	—	—
1996	26	—	—	DSQ	—	—
1997	27	—	—	—	—	—
1999	29	—	DNF1	4	5	—
2001	31	—	—	2	7	—
2003	33	—	23	1	5	—

== Olympic results ==
Year	Age	Slalom	Giant Slalom	Super G	Downhill	Combined
1992	22	—	—	—	—	—
1994	24	—	—	—	—	—
1998	28	—	2	DNF	—	—
2002	32	—	1	2	3	—

== See also ==
- Ski World Cup Most podiums & Top 10 results
