= Fredrik Nyberg =

Swedish alpine skier

Personal information
- Nationality: Sweden
- Born: 23 March 1969 (age 57) Skön, Sweden

Sport
- Sport: Skiing

Mats Fredrik Nyberg (born 23 March 1969) is a former Swedish alpine skier.

He was born in Skön (Sundsvall).

Excelling in giant slalom and super-G, he won a total of seven World Cup races in those disciplines. He took part in a total of five Winter Olympics; his 5th-place finish in the 2006 Olympic giant slalom was his best Olympic result.

Nyberg planned to end his career after the 2006–07 season, but crashed during practice in Austria on 10 November 2006, causing a serious knee injury. The injury forced him to end his career at the age of 37 without a start in his last season.

== World Cup victories ==
Date	Location	Discipline
3 March 1990	(Switzerland) Veysonnaz	Giant slalom
9 August 1990	(New Zealand) Mount Hutt	Giant slalom
8 January 1994	(Slovenia) Kranjska Gora	Giant slalom
6 March 1994	(United States) Aspen	Giant slalom
30 November 1996	(United States) Breckenridge	Giant slalom
3 December 2000	(United States) Vail / Beaver Creek	Super-G
20 December 2001	(Slovenia) Kranjska Gora	Giant slalom
