= Austria national alpine ski team =

Austria
- National federation: Österreichischer Skiverband
- Coach: Marko Pfeifer (men); Roland Assinger (women)

Olympic Games
- Appearances: 24
- Medals: 128

World Championships
- Appearances: 46
- Medals: 303
Medal record
Alpine skiing
Event	1st	2nd	3rd
Winter Olympics	40	44	44
World Championships	101	104	97
Total	141	148	141

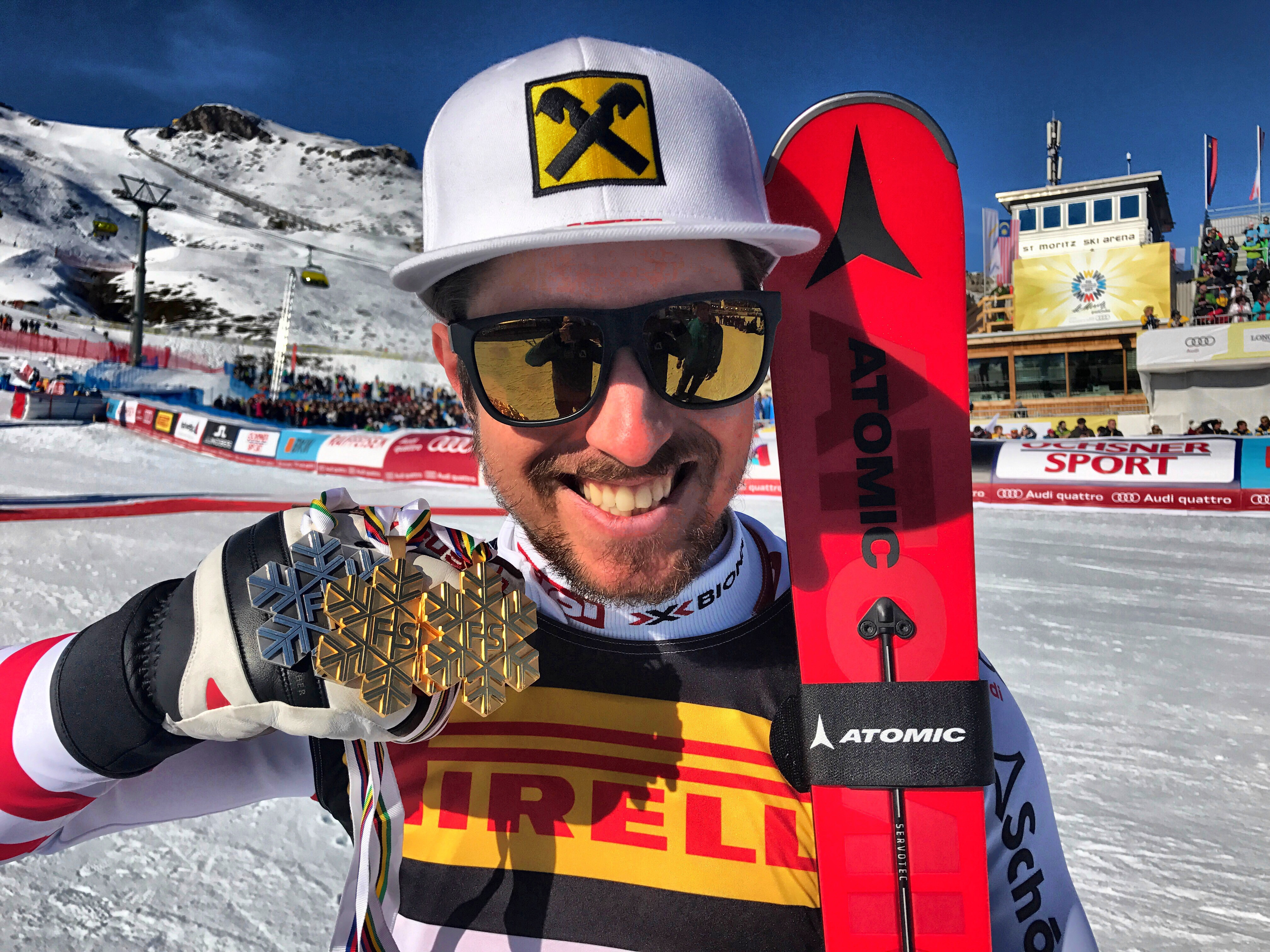
Marcel Hirscher eight overall World Cup and 15 medals between Olympicxs and World Championships.

The Austria national alpine ski team, also known as Wunderteam, represents Austria in International alpine skiing competitions such as Winter Olympic Games, FIS Alpine Ski World Cup and FIS Alpine World Ski Championships.

== World Cup ==
Austrian alpine skiers won 34 overall FIS Alpine Ski World Cup, 17 with men and 17 with women and won 926 races.

Update to the end of 2021-22 season

Still active

=== Titles ===
==== Men ====
Skier	Overall	Downhill	Super G	Giant slalom	Slalom	Combined	Total
Marcel Hirscher	8	-	-	6	6	-	20
Hermann Maier	4	2	5	3	-	-	14
Stephan Eberharter	2	3	2	-	-	-	7
Benjamin Raich	1	-	-	2	3	1	7
Karl Schranz	2	2	-	1	-	-	5
Franz Klammer	-	5	-	-	-	-	5
Michael Walchhofer	-	3	-	-	-	-	3
Thomas Sykora	-	-	-	-	2	-	2
Helmut Höflehner	-	2	-	-	-	-	2
Vincent Kriechmayr	-	-	1	-	-	-	1
Marco Schwarz	-	-	-	-	1	-	1
Klaus Kröll	-	1	-	-	-	-	1
Reinfried Herbst	-	-	-	-	1	-	1
Hannes Reichelt	-	-	1	-	-	-	1
Rainer Schönfelder	-	-	-	-	1	-	1
Thomas Stangassinger	-	-	-	-	1	-	1
Andreas Schifferer	-	1	-	-	-	-	1
Christian Mayer	-	-	-	1	-	-	1
Peter Wirnsberger	-	1	-	-	-	-	1
Harti Weirather	-	1	-	-	-	-	1
Hansi Hinterseer	-	-	-	1	-	-	1
Karl Cordin	-	1	-	-	-	-	1
Alfred Matt	-	-	-	-	1	-	1
Gerhard Nenning	-	1	-	-	-	-	1
Totale	17	23	9	14	16	1	80

==== Women ====
Skier	Overall	Downhill	Super G	Giant slalom	Slalom	Combined	Total
Annemarie Moser-Pröll	6	7	-	3	-	-	16
Renate Götschl	1	5	3	-	-	-	9
Michaela Dorfmeister	1	2	2	1	-	-	6
Marlies Schild	-	-	-	-	4	1	5
Petra Kronberger	3	-	-	-	1	-	4
Anna Fenninger	2	-	-	2	-	-	4
Alexandra Meissnitzer	1	-	1	1	-	-	3
Anita Wachter	1	-	-	2	-	-	3
Nicole Hosp	1	-	-	1	-	-	2
Gertrud Gabl	1	-	-	-	1	-	2
Roswitha Steiner	-	-	-	-	2	-	2
Brigitte Totschnig	-	2	-	-	-	-	2
Katharina Liensberger	-	-	-	-	1	-	1
Nicole Schmidhofer	-	1	-	-	-	-	1
Eva-Maria Brem	-	-	-	1	-	-	1
Sabine Egger	-	-	-	-	1	-	1
Elfi Eder	-	-	-	-	1	-	1
Regina Sackl	-	-	-	-	1	-	1
Monika Kaserer	-	-	-	1	-	-	1
Wiltrud Drexel	-	1	-	-	-	-	1
Olga Pall	-	1	-	-	-	-	1
Totale	17	19	6	12	12	1	67

=== Wins ===
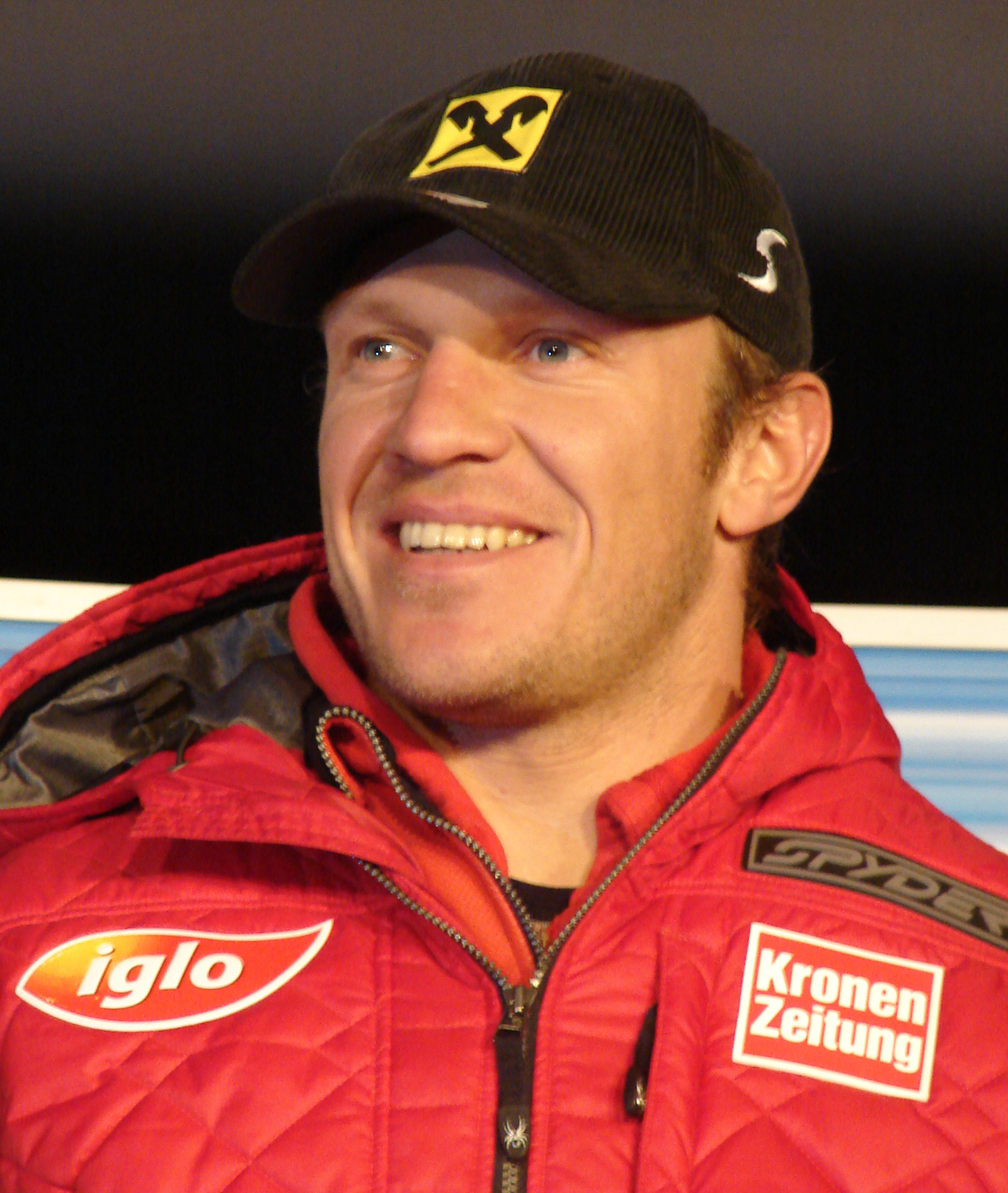
Hermann Maier

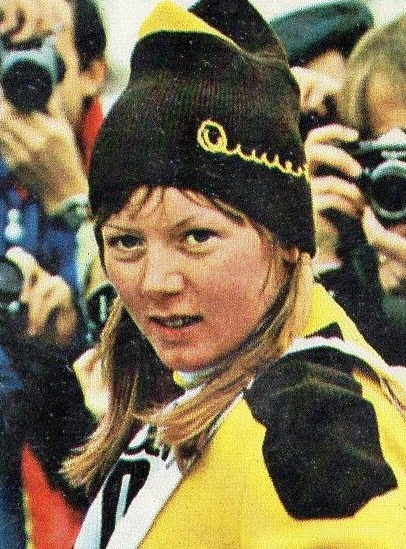
Annemarie Moser-Pröll

==== Men ====
#	Skier	Wins	Disciplines						Podiums
#	Skier	Wins	DH	SG	GS	SL	KB	PR	Podiums
1	Marcel Hirscher	67	-	1	31	32	-	3	138
2	Hermann Maier	54	15	24	14	-	1	-	96
3	Benjamin Raich	36	-	1	14	14	7	-	92
4	Stephan Eberharter	29	18	6	5	-	-	-	75
5	Franz Klammer	26	25	-	-	-	1	-	45
6	Michael Walchhofer	19	14	3	-	-	2	-	49
7	Mario Matt	15	-	-	-	14	1	-	42
8	Günther Mader	14	1	6	2	1	4	-	41
9	Hannes Reichelt	13	6	6	1	-	-	-	44
10	Karl Schranz	12	8	-	4	-	-	-	22
10	Vincent Kriechmayr	12	5	7	-	-	-	-	27
11	Matthias Mayer	11	7	3	-	-	1	-	43
12	Helmut Höflehner	10	10	-	-	-	-	-	25
12	Thomas Stangassinger	10	-	-	-	10	-	-	37
14	Reinfried Herbst	9	-	-	-	9	-	-	16
14	Fritz Strobl	9	7	2	-	-	-	-	31
14	Thomas Sykora	9	-	-	-	9	-	-	21

==== Women ====
#	Skier	Wins	Disciplines						Podiums
#	Skier	Wins	DH	SG	GS	SL	KB	PR	Podiums
1	Annemarie Moser-Pröll	62	36	-	16	3	7	3	113
2	Renate Götschl	46	24	17	-	1	4	-	110
3	Marlies Schild	37	-	-	1	35	1	-	68
4	Michaela Dorfmeister	25	7	10	8	-	-	-	64
5	Anita Wachter	19	-	2	14	1	2	1	75
6	Petra Kronberger	16	6	2	3	3	2	-	35
7	Anna Fenninger	15	-	3	11	-	1	-	46
8	Alexandra Meissnitzer	14	2	7	5	-	-	-	44
9	Nicole Hosp	12	-	1	5	5	1	-	57
10	Monika Kaserer	10	-	-	8	1	-	1	42
11	Kathrin Zettel	9	-	-	7	2	-	-	50
12	Roswitha Steiner	8	-	-	-	8	-	-	14
12	Brigitte Totschnig	8	7	-	1	-	-	-	13
14	Gertrud Gabl	7	-	-	2	5	-	-	16
14	Elisabeth Görgl	7	2	3	2	-	-	-	42

== See also ==
- Austria at the Olympics
