= Roland Assinger =

Austrian alpine skier (born 1973)

Personal information
- Born: 9 May 1973 (age 53) Hermagor-Pressegger See, Austria

Skiing career
- Country: Austria
- Sport: Alpine skiing
- Club: SC Hermagor/Kärnten
- Retired: March 2003 (age 29)
- Disciplines: Downhill, super-G
- World Cup debut: 15 March 1995 (age 21)

World Cup
- Seasons: 7 – (1995–2001)
- Wins: 0
- Podiums: 1 – (1 DH)
- Overall titles: 0 – (44th in 1996)
- Discipline titles: 0 – (14th in DH, 1996)
Medal record
World Cup race podiums
Event	1st	2nd	3rd
Downhill	0	1	0
Total	0	1	0

Roland Assinger (born 9 May 1973 in Hermagor-Pressegger See, Hermagor District, Carinthia) is an Austrian former alpine skier. He became the head coach of the Austrian women's ski team on 1 April 2023, and the Austrian Ski Federation confirmed he will stay in the role through the 2026 season. As a racer, he made his World Cup debut on 15 March 1995 and retired in March 2023.

== World Cup results ==
=== Season standings ===
Season
Season	Age	Overall	Slalom	Giant slalom	Super-G	Downhill	Combined
1996	22	44	—	—	—	14	—
1997	23	56	—	—	—	20	—
1998	24	45	—	—	—	16	—
1999	25	118	—	—	—	51	—
2000	26	82	—	—	—	29	—

=== Top ten finishes ===
- 0 wins
- 1 podium – (1 DH); 9 top tens

Season
Season	Date	Location	Discipline	Place
1996	1 December 1995	Vail, United States	Downhill	6th
1996	9 December 1995	Val d'Isère, France	Downhill	2nd
1996	29 December 1995	Bormio, Italy	Downhill	10th
1996	6 March 1996	Kvitfjell, Norway	Downhill	10th
1998	4 December 1997	Beaver Creek, United States	Downhill	5th
1998	5 December 1997	Beaver Creek, United States	Downhill	7th
1998	29 December 1997	Bormio, Italy	Downhill	8th
1998	30 December 1997	Bormio, Italy	Downhill	8th
2000	22 January 2000	Kitzbühel, Austria	Downhill	8th
