= Matic Skube =

Slovenian alpine skier (born 1988)

Personal information
- Born: 23 February 1988 (age 38) Kranj, SFR Yugoslavia

Skiing career
- Sport: Alpine skiing
- Club: APT – SK Alpetour
- Retired: 4 June 2016 (age 28)
- Disciplines: Slalom, giant slalom
- World Cup debut: 12 November 2006 (age 18)

Olympics
- Teams: 1 – (2010)
- Medals: 0

World Championships
- Teams: 3 – (2011, 2013, 2015)

World Cup
- Seasons: 5 – (2010–12, 2015–16)
Medal record
Junior World Championships
Gold medal – first place	2007 Flachau	Slalom

Matic Skube (born February 23, 1988, in Kranj, SFR Yugoslavia) is a retired alpine skier from Slovenia. He competed for Slovenia at the 2010 Winter Olympics where he failed to finish the first run of the slalom.

At the World Junior Alpine Skiing Championships 2007, he won the gold medal in slalom. He won World Cup points seven times, last time on 15 March 2015 in Kranjska Gora with 27th place in slalom. His best result is 12th place, also in slalom, in 2011 in Adelboden.

He was included in Slovenian Men's team for the 2016–17 season, but on 4 June 2016 he announced his retirement from the sport.
