= World Junior Alpine Skiing Championships 2007 =

International skiing competition

The World Junior Alpine Skiing Championships 2007 were the 26th World Junior Alpine Skiing Championships, held between 6–11 March 2007 in Altenmarkt im Pongau and Flachau, Austria.

== Medal winners ==
=== Men's events ===
| Event | Gold | | Silver | | Bronze | |
|---|---|---|---|---|---|---|
| Downhill | Beat Feuz; Switzerland | 1:38.41 | Matts Olsson; Sweden | 1:38.85 | Bernhard Graf; Austria | 1:38.96 |
| Super-G | Beat Feuz; Switzerland | 1:07.77 | Joachim Puchner; Austria | 1:07.85 | Bernhard Graf; Austria | 1:07.96 |
| Giant Slalom | Marcel Hirscher; Austria | 2:14.01 | Marcus Sandell; Finland | 2:14.86 | Matts Olsson; Sweden | 2:15.17 |
| Slalom | Matic Skube; Slovenia | 1:49.45 | Marcel Hirscher; Austria | 1:49.56 | Beat Feuz; Switzerland | 1:50.73 |
| Combined | Beat Feuz; Switzerland | 22.36 points | Bernhard Graf; Austria | 31.31 | Miha Kürner; Slovenia | 38.74 |

=== Women's events ===
| Event | Gold | | Silver | | Bronze | |
|---|---|---|---|---|---|---|
| Downhill | Tina Weirather; Liechtenstein | 1:39.69 | Lara Gut; Switzerland | 1:39.76 | Nicole Schmidhofer; Austria | 1:40.50 |
| Super-G | Nicole Schmidhofer; Austria | 1:19.34 | Tina Weirather; Liechtenstein | 1:19.45 | Eva-Maria Brem; Austria | 1:19.72 |
| Giant Slalom | Nicole Schmidhofer; Austria | 2:14.90 | Tina Weirather; Liechtenstein | 2:15.20 | Eva-Maria Brem; Austria | 2:15.45 |
| Slalom | Ilka Štuhec; Slovenia | 1:44.23 | Katharina Dürr; Germany | 1:44.30 | Simone Streng; Austria | 1:44.79 |
| Combined | Ilka Štuhec; Slovenia | 35.66 points | Nicole Schmidhofer; Austria | 39.12 | Maruša Ferk; Slovenia | 42.16 |
