= Cristian Deville =

Italian alpine skier

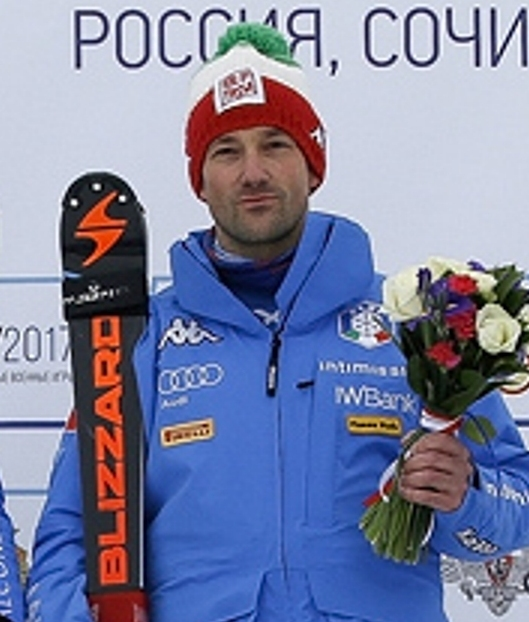
- Cristian Deville (2017)

Personal information
- Born: 3 January 1981 (age 45) Cavalese, Trentino, Italy
- Height: 1.74 m (5 ft 9 in)
- Website: cristiandeville.com

Skiing career
- Sport: Alpine skiing
- Club: G.S. Fiamme Gialle
- Disciplines: Slalom
- World Cup debut: 5 January, 2003 (age 22)

Olympics
- Teams: 1 – (2010)
- Medals: 0

World Championships
- Teams: 3 – (2005, 2007, 2011)
- Medals: 0

World Cup
- Seasons: 11th – (2005–15)
- Wins: 1
- Podiums: 4 – (4 SL)
- Overall titles: 0 – (23rd in 2012)
- Discipline titles: 0 – (4th in SL, 2012)
Medal record
Men's alpine skiing
Representing Italy
World Military Games
| Gold medal – first place | 2017 Sochi | Slalom team |
| Bronze medal – third place | 2017 Sochi | Slalom |
Junior World Ski Championships
| Bronze medal – third place | 2001 Verbier | Slalom |

Cristian Deville (born 3 January 1981) is a World Cup alpine ski racer from Italy.

== Career ==
Born in Cavalese, Trentino, he competes in the technical events and specializes in the slalom. Deville made his World Cup debut in January 2003, and has competed for Italy in three World Championships and the 2010 Olympics.

Through March 2013, Deville has one World Cup win, four podiums, and 19 top ten finishes, all in slalom.

== World Cup results ==
=== Season standings ===
| Season | Age | Overall | Slalom | Giant Slalom | Super G | Downhill | Combined |
|---|---|---|---|---|---|---|---|
| 2004 | 23 | 121 | 51 | — | — | — | — |
| 2005 | 24 | 84 | 31 | — | — | — | — |
| 2006 | 25 | 74 | 27 | — | — | — | — |
| 2007 | 26 | 54 | 17 | — | — | — | — |
| 2008 | 27 | 39 | 11 | — | — | — | — |
| 2009 | 28 | 86 | 30 | — | — | — | — |
| 2010 | 29 | 83 | 27 | — | — | — | — |
| 2011 | 30 | 36 | 11 | — | — | — | — |
| 2012 | 31 | 23 | 4 | — | — | — | — |
| 2013 | 32 | 73 | 25 | — | — | — | — |
| 2014 | 33 | 93 | 34 | — | — | — | — |
| 2015 | 34 | 109 | 34 | — | — | — | — |
| 2016 | 35 | unranked | 0 points | | | | |
| 2017 | 36 | unranked | 0 points | | | | |
| 2018 | 34 | 121 | 37 | — | — | — | — |

- Standings through 28 January 2018

=== Race podiums ===
- 1 win – (1 SL)
- 4 podiums – (4 SL)

| Season | Date | Location | Discipline | Place |
|---|---|---|---|---|
| 2012 | 8 Dec 2011 | Beaver Creek, USA | Slalom | 2nd |
| 2012 | 21 Dec 2011 | Flachau, Austria | Slalom | 3rd |
| 2012 | 22 Jan 2012 | Kitzbühel, Austria | Slalom | 1st |
| 2012 | 11 Mar 2012 | Kranjska Gora, Slovenia | Slalom | 2nd |
