= Marcel Mathis =

Austrian alpine skier

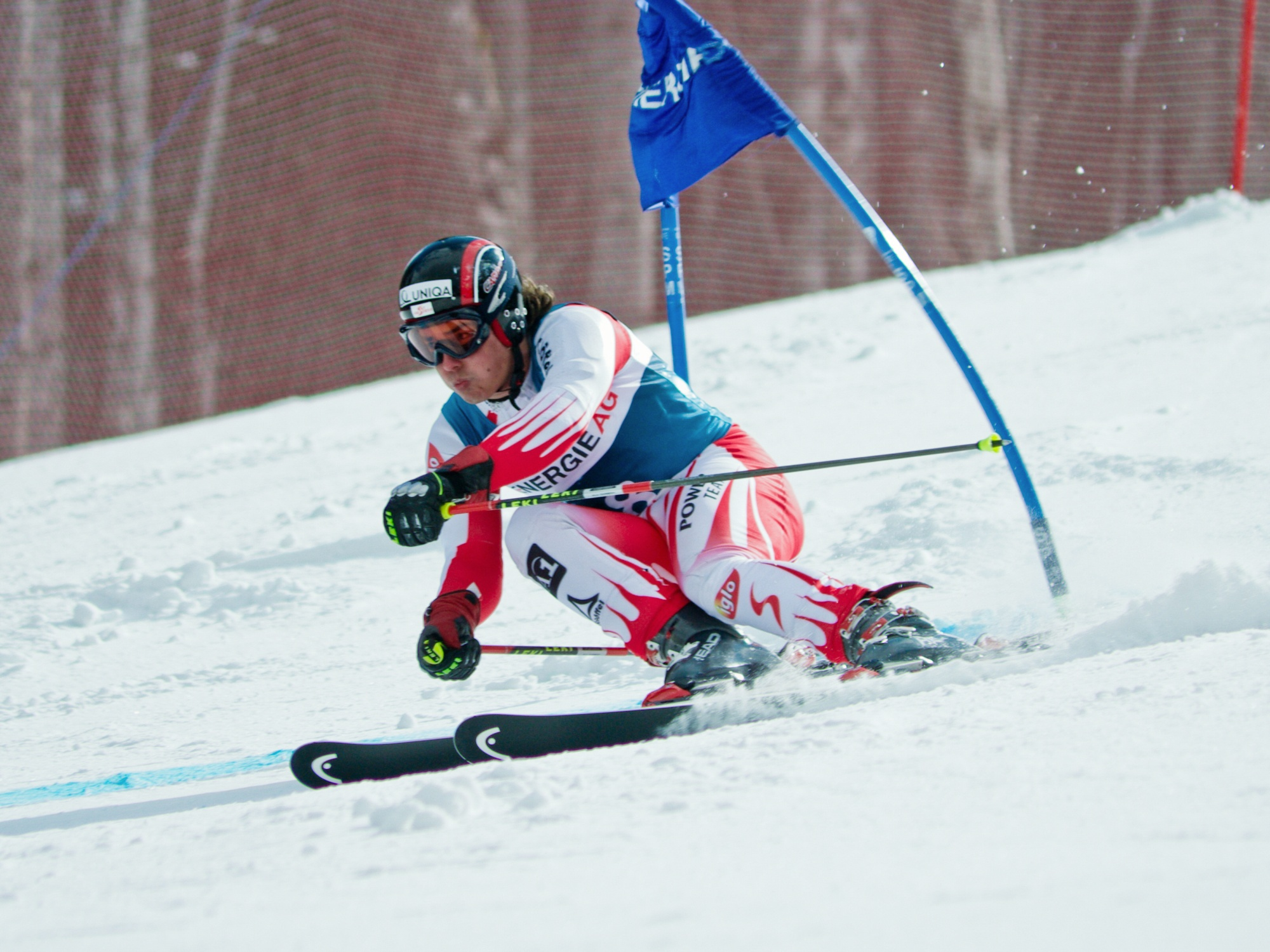
- Mathis in March 2010

Personal information
- Born: December 24, 1991 (age 34) Hohenems, Vorarlberg, Austria
- Height: 1.75 m (5 ft 9 in)
- Website: marcelmathis.at

Skiing career
- Sport: Alpine skiing
- Club: SV Hohenems – Vorarlberg
- Disciplines: Giant slalom
- World Cup debut: January 29, 2010 (age 18)

Olympics
- Teams: 0

World Championships
- Teams: 0
- Medals: 1 (1 gold)

World Cup
- Seasons: 1st – (2012)
- Wins: 0
- Podiums: 2 – (2 GS)
- Overall titles: 0
- Discipline titles: 0 – (15th in GS, 2012)
Medal record
World Championships
Gold medal – first place	2013 Schladming	Team

Marcel Mathis (born December 24, 1991) is a former World Cup alpine ski racer from Austria. Born in Hohenems, Vorarlberg, he primarily competed on the European Cup circuit, but raced in several World Cup events, all in giant slalom.

Mathis' first top result in World Cup was his third place in giant slalom in Bansko, Bulgaria, on February 18, 2012. He was in 26th place after the first run but had the fastest second run to attain the podium. It was also his first top twenty finish at the World Cup level. He finished seventh the following week in Crans-Montana for his second top ten in as many weeks. A third success of this season came three weeks later in Schladming, where he attained the podium again with an excellent second run.

== World Cup podiums ==
- 2 podium – (2 GS)

Season	Date	Location	Race	Place
2012	18 Feb 2012	Bansko, Bulgaria	Giant slalom	3rd
2012	17 Mar 2012	Schladming, Austria	Giant slalom	3rd

== Video ==
- YouTube.com – Marcel Mathis stuns with first WC podium – from Universal Sports – 2012-02-18
