= Nicole Schmidhofer =

Austrian alpine skier

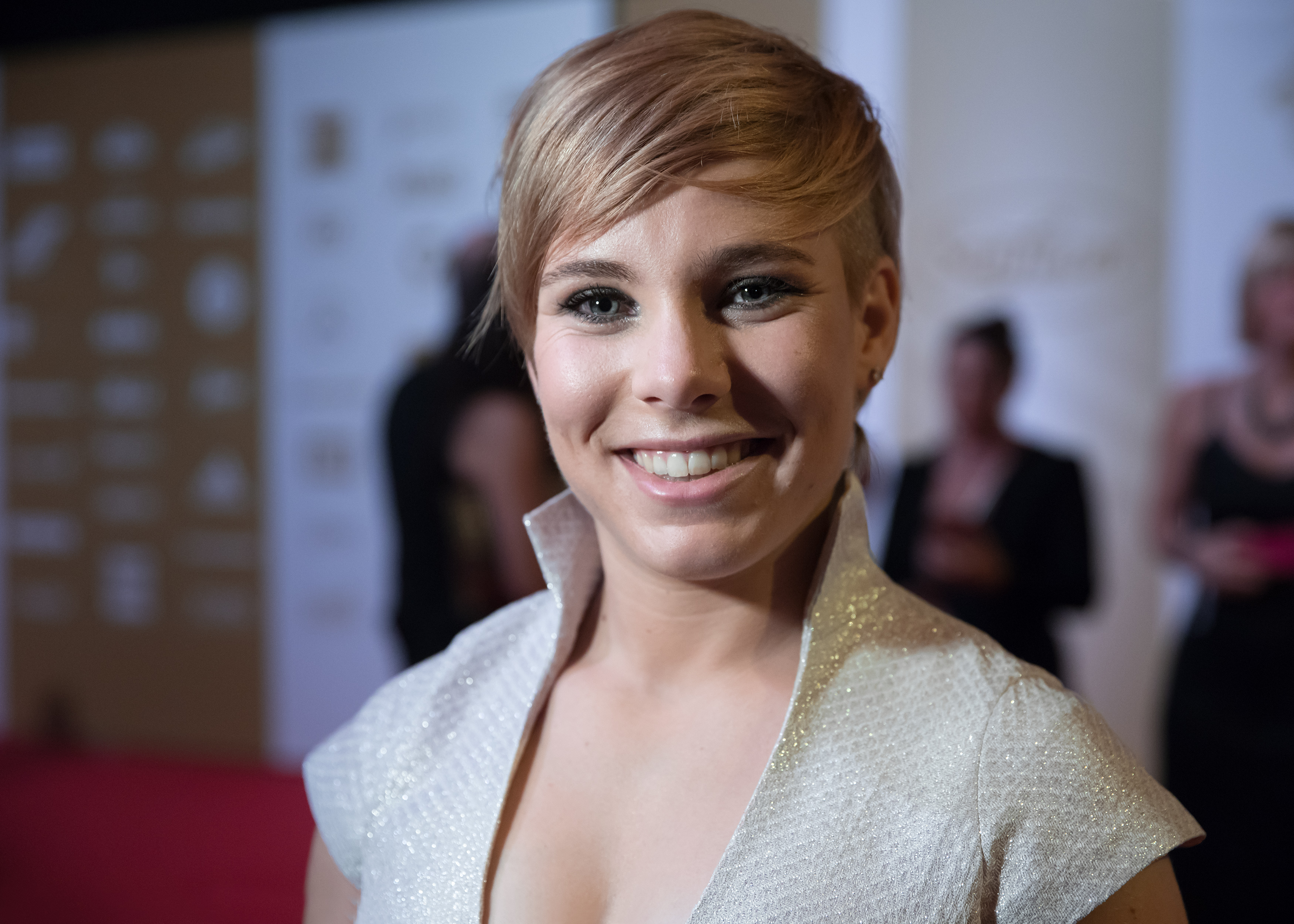
- Schmidhofer in November 2017

Personal information
- Born: 15 March 1989 (age 37) Friesach, Carinthia, Austria
- Height: 1.58 m (5 ft 2 in)
- Website: nici-schmidhofer.at

Skiing career
- Sport: Alpine skiing
- Club: Union SC; Schönberg-Lachtal
- Retired: April 2023 (age 34)
- Disciplines: Downhill, super-G
- World Cup debut: 15 March 2007 (age 18)

Olympics
- Teams: 2 – (2010, 2018)
- Medals: 0

World Championships
- Teams: 4 – (2013–2019)
- Medals: 1 (1 gold)

World Cup
- Seasons: 17 – (2007–2023)
- Wins: 4 – (3 DH, 1 SG)
- Podiums: 12 – (6 DH, 6 SG)
- Overall titles: 0 – (5th in 2019)
- Discipline titles: 1 – (DH, 2019)
Medal record
Women's alpine skiing
Representing Austria
World Cup race podiums
Event	1st	2nd	3rd
Super-G	1	3	2
Downhill	3	2	1
Total	4	5	3
World Championships
Gold medal – first place	2017 St. Moritz	Super-G
Junior World Championships
Gold medal – first place	2007 Altenmarkt/Flachau	Super-G
Gold medal – first place	2007 Altenmarkt/Flachau	Giant slalom
Silver medal – second place	2007 Altenmarkt/Flachau	Combined
Bronze medal – third place	2009 Garmisch-Partenkirchen	Downhill
Bronze medal – third place	2007 Altenmarkt/Flachau	Downhill

Nicole "Nici" Schmidhofer (born 15 March 1989) is an Austrian former World Cup alpine ski racer. She specializes in the downhill and super-G events.

== Career ==
Born in Friesach, Carinthia, Schmidhofer made her World Cup debut in March 2007. She competed for Austria at the 2010 Winter Olympics, but did not finish in the super-G, which was her only event at the Olympics. Three years later, Schmidhofer finished in 11th place in the super-G at the 2013 World Championships in Schladming.

At the 2017 World Championships, she became a gold medalist in super-G.

Her breakout World Cup season was in 2019, with three wins and three additional podiums; she won the season title in downhill and was runner-up in super-G. In March 2019, she participated in her first speed skiing world championships in Vars, France She finished 4th with a new Austria national record of 217.590 km/h. She retired after the 2023 season at age 34.

== World Cup results ==
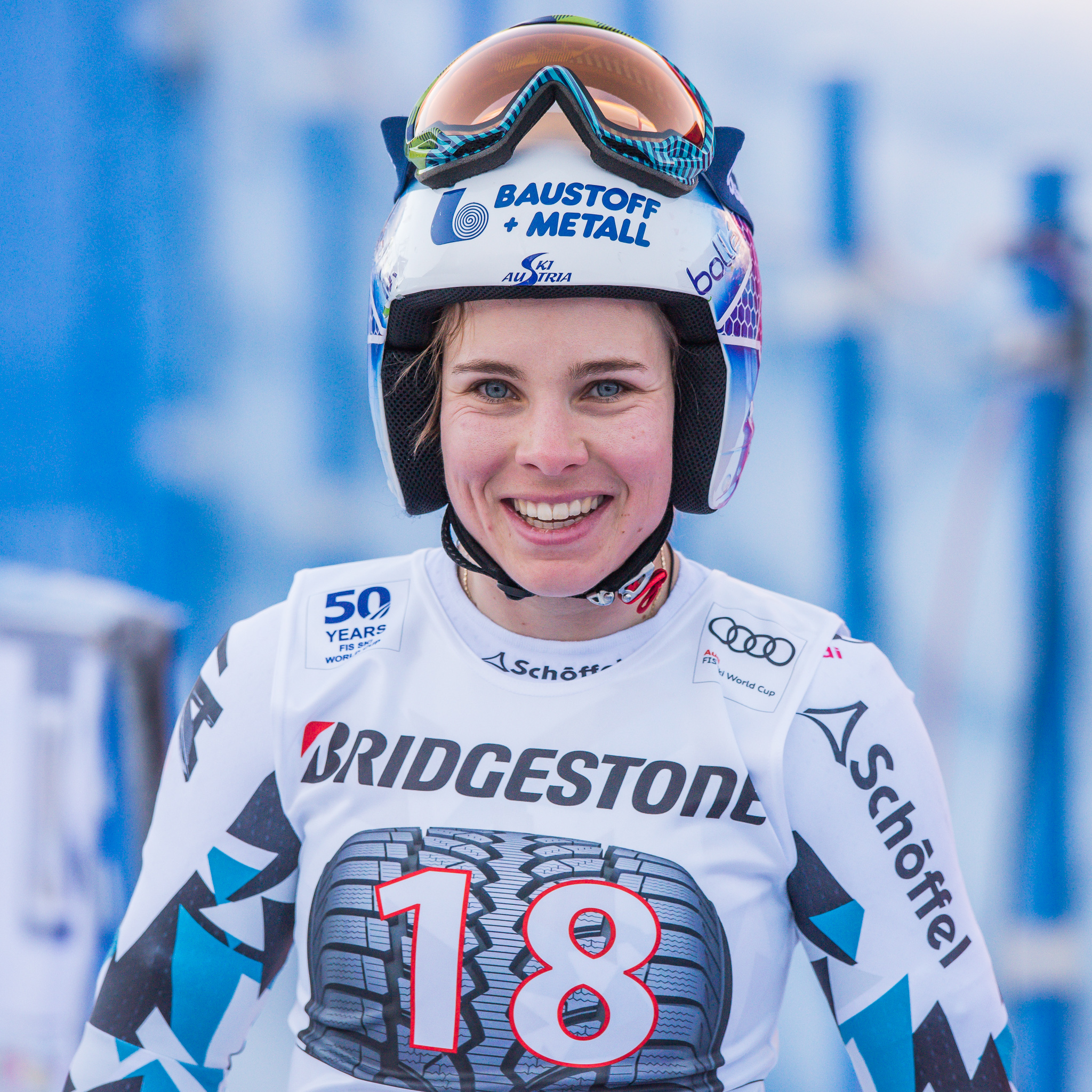
At Garmisch-Partenkirchen in January 2017

=== Season standings ===
Season	Age	Overall	Slalom	Giant slalom	Super-G	Downhill	Combined
2007	17	104	—	57	41	—	—
2008	18	124	—	—	—	51	—
2009	19	70	—	—	26	40	—
2010	20	81	—	—	28	49	—
2011	21	91	—	—	38	36	—
2012	22	86	—	—	—	35	—
2013	23	45	—	—	8	36	—
2014	24	20	—	—	12	11	—
2015	25	30	—	—	12	20	—
2016	26	49	—	—	23	21	—
2017	27	15	—	—	7	8	—
2018	28	17	—	—	7	9	—
2019	29	5	—	—	2	1	—
2020	30	13	—	—	3	9	—
2021	31	Injured left knee in December, out for season					
2022	32	109	—	—	45	—	—N/a
2023	33	53	—	—	19	40	—N/a

=== Race podiums ===
- 4 wins – (3 DH, 1 SG)
- 12 podiums – 6 DH, 6 SG), 52 top tens

Season	Date	Location	Discipline	Place
2013	20 Jan 2013	Cortina d'Ampezzo, Italy	Super-G	2nd
2014	24 Jan 2014	Cortina d'Ampezzo, Italy	Downhill	3rd
2018	3 Dec 2017	Lake Louise, Canada	Super-G	3rd
2018	21 Jan 2018	Cortina d'Ampezzo, Italy	Super-G	3rd
2019	30 Nov 2018	Lake Louise, Canada	Downhill	1st
2019	1 Dec 2018	Lake Louise, Canada	Downhill	1st
2019	19 Dec 2018	Val Gardena, Italy	Super-G	2nd
2019	19 Jan 2019	Cortina d'Ampezzo, Italy	Downhill	2nd
2019	26 Jan 2019	Garmisch-Partenkirchen, Germany	Super-G	1st
2019	23 Feb 2019	Crans-Montana, Switzerland	Downhill	2nd
2020	7 Dec 2019	Lake Louise, Canada	Downhill	1st
2020	09 Feb 2020	Garmisch-Partenkirchen, Germany	Super-G	2nd

== World Championship results ==
Year	Age	Slalom	Giant slalom	Super-G	Downhill	Combined
2013	23	—	—	11	—	—
2015	25	—	—	—	4	—
2017	27	—	—	1	16	—
2019	29	—	—	11	9	—

== Olympic results ==
Year	Age	Slalom	Giant slalom	Super-G	Downhill	Combined
2010	20	—	—	DNF1	—	—
2014	24	—	—	—	—	—
2018	28	—	—	18	12	—
2022	32	Did not compete				
