= World Junior Alpine Skiing Championships 2008 =

International skiing competition

The World Junior Alpine Skiing Championships 2008 were the 27th World Junior Alpine Skiing Championships, held between 23–29 February 2008 in Formigal, Spain.

== Medal winners ==
=== Men's events ===
Event	Gold		Silver		Bronze	
Downhill	Hagen Patscheider; Italy	1:45.31	Eian Sandvik; Norway	1:45.32	Jonas Fravi; Switzerland	1:45.59
Super-G	Andreas Sander; Germany	1:21.02	Matthias Mayer; Austria	1:21.14	Björn Sieber; Austria	1:21.18
Giant Slalom	Marcel Hirscher; Austria	1:57.00	Markus Nilsen; Norway	1:57.33	Matts Olsson; Sweden	1:58.19
Slalom	Marcel Hirscher; Austria	1:29.68	Jacopo Di Ronco; Italy	1:30.61	Tomoya Ishii; Japan; Kristian Haug; Norway	1:30.83
Combined	Matts Olsson; Sweden	28.63 points	Kristian Haug; Norway	32.65	Hagen Patscheider; Italy	36.90

- Two bronze medals were awarded in the Slalom.

=== Women's events ===
Event	Gold		Silver		Bronze	
Downhill	Ilka Štuhec; Slovenia	1:50.13	Lara Gut; Switzerland	1:50.73	Viktoria Rebensburg; Germany	1:51.17
Super-G	Viktoria Rebensburg; Germany	1:40.19	Anna Fenninger; Austria	1:40.97	Stefanie Moser; Austria	1:41.65
Giant Slalom	Anna Fenninger; Austria	1:42.50	Viktoria Rebensburg; Germany	1:42.83	Tessa Worley; France	1:42.86
Slalom	Bernadette Schild; Austria	1:33.85	Célina Hangl; Switzerland	1:34.76	Nastasia Noens; France	1:35.14
Combined	Anna Fenninger; Austria	30.20 points	Larisa Yurkiw; Canada	77.62	Eva-Maria Brem; Austria	79.43
