= Eva-Maria Brem =

Austrian alpine skier

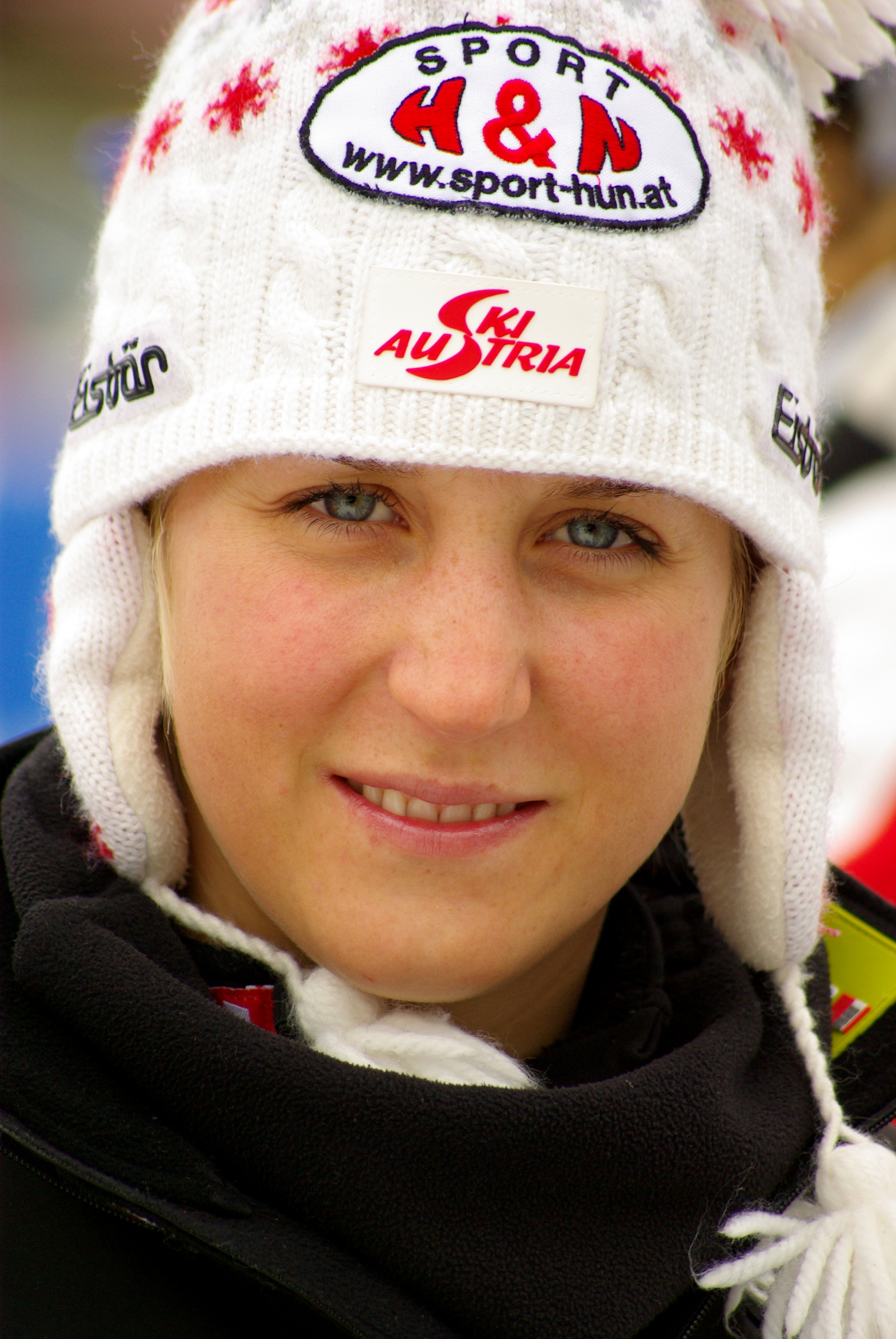
- Brem in March 2008

Personal information
- Born: 13 August 1988 (age 37) Schwaz, Tyrol, Austria
- Height: 160 cm (5 ft 3 in)
- Website: evamariabrem.com

Skiing career
- Sport: Alpine skiing
- Club: WSV Reith i.A.-Tirol
- Disciplines: Giant slalom, slalom, combined
- World Cup debut: 29 December 2005 (age 17)

Olympics
- Teams: 1 – (2010)
- Medals: 0

World Championships
- Teams: 1 (2015)
- Medals: 1 (1 gold)

World Cup
- Seasons: 16 – (2006–2021)
- Wins: 3 – (3 GS)
- Podiums: 11 – (11 GS)
- Overall titles: 0 – (12th in 2016)
- Discipline titles: 1 – (GS, 2016)
Medal record
Women's alpine skiing
Representing Austria
World Championships
Gold medal – first place	2015 Beaver Creek	Team event
Junior World Ski Championships
Bronze medal – third place	2006 Mont-Sainte-Anne	Giant slalom
Bronze medal – third place	2007 Altenmarkt	Giant slalom
Bronze medal – third place	2007 Altenmarkt	Super-G
Bronze medal – third place	2008 Formigal	Combined

Eva-Maria Brem (born 13 September 1988) is an Austrian former World Cup alpine ski racer, who specialised in giant slalom.

Born in Schwaz, Tyrol, Brem resides in nearby Münster and made her World Cup debut at age 17 in December 2005 in a slalom at Lienz. She represented Austria at the 2010 Winter Olympics, and finished in seventh place in the giant slalom. Brem attained her first two World Cup podiums in March 2014 and first victory that November, all in giant slalom.

== World Cup results ==
=== Season titles ===
- 1 title – (1 Giant slalom)

Season	Discipline
2016	Giant slalom

=== Season standings ===
Season	Age	Overall	Slalom	Giant slalom	Super-G	Downhill	Combined
2007	18	131	—	—	—	—	47
2008	19	52	—	17	—	—	24
2009	20	68	—	27	—	—	23
2010	21	41	55	11	—	—	44
2011	22	106	—	36	—	—	—
2012	23	59	44	20	—	—	—
2013	24	46	—	13	—	—	—
2014	25	27	39	8	—	—	—
2015	26	13	41	2	—	—	—
2016	27	12	31	1	—	—	—
2017	28	122	—	50	—	—	—
2018	29	97	—	32	—	—	—
2019	30	58	—	17	—	—	—
2020	31	78	—	27	—	—	—
2021	32	120	—	58	—	—	—

- Standings through 10 April 2021

=== Race podiums ===
- 3 wins – (3 GS)
- 11 podiums – (11 GS)

Season	Date	Location	Discipline	Place
2014	6 Mar 2014	Åre, Sweden	Giant slalom	3rd
2014	16 Mar 2014	Lenzerheide, Switzerland	Giant slalom	2nd
2015	25 Oct 2014	Sölden, Austria	Giant slalom	3rd
2015	29 Nov 2014	(United States) Aspen, USA	Giant slalom	1st
2015	12 Dec 2014	Åre, Sweden	Giant slalom	3rd
2015	13 Mar 2015	Åre, Sweden	Giant slalom	3rd
2015	22 Mar 2015	Méribel, France	Giant slalom	2nd
2016	27 Nov 2015	(United States) Aspen, USA	Giant slalom	2nd
2016	12 Dec 2015	Åre, Sweden	Giant slalom	2nd
2016	20 Dec 2015	Courchevel, France	Giant slalom	1st
2016	7 Mar 2016	Jasná, Slovakia	Giant slalom	1st

== World Championship results ==
Year	Age	Slalom	Giant slalom	Super-G	Downhill	Combined
2015	26	—	DNF1	—	—	—
2017	28	injured: did not compete				

== Olympic results ==
Year	Age	Slalom	Giant slalom	Super-G	Downhill	Combined
2010	21	—	7	—	—	—

Awards
Preceded by Anna Fenninger	Austrian Sportswoman of the year 2016	Succeeded by Anna Gasser
