= Austrian Ski Association =

Sport governing body

- Jurisdiction: Austria
- Founded: 1905
- Affiliation: International Ski and Snowboard Federation
- Headquarters: Innsbruck
- Location: Austria
- President: Roswitha Stadlober

Official website
- oesv.at

The Austrian Ski Association (Österreichischer Skiverband, abbrev. ÖSV (in German)) is the winter sports federation for Austria. Part of the International Ski and Snowboard Federation (FIS), it deals with some federations conducting sports for the Winter Olympics, including skiing, biathlon and ski jumping.

== History ==
=== Alpine skiing ===
Austrian alpine skiers won 34 overall FIS Alpine Ski World Cup, 17 with men and 17 with women and won 926 races.

=== Ski jumping ===
The Austrian ski jumpers won 7 gold medals at the Winter Olympics, the Austrian team is third in the all-time medal table.

== Controversies ==
=== 2017 abuse allegations ===
In 2017 the former alpine skier Nicola Spiess-Werdenigg reported serious cases of sexual abuse in the ÖSV in the 1970s.

=== Death of Toni Sailer ===
After his death, the former Austrian ski legend Toni Sailer, formerly an official of the ÖSV, was accused of having been used for the consumption of alcohol and to this came the accusations of sexual violence against a woman for facts that occurred in the 1970s.

=== 2019 doping raids ===
On 27 February 2019 it was announced that the two Austrian cross-country skiers Dominik Baldauf and Max Hauke were arrested following an anti-doping raid.

== Sports ==
- Alpine skiing
- Cross-country skiing
- Nordic combined
- Ski jumping
- Biathlon
- Snowboarding
- Ski cross
- Freestyle skiing

== See also ==
- Austria national alpine ski team
- Austrian Alpine Ski Championships
