= Marcel Hirscher =

Austrian-Dutch alpine skier (born 1989)

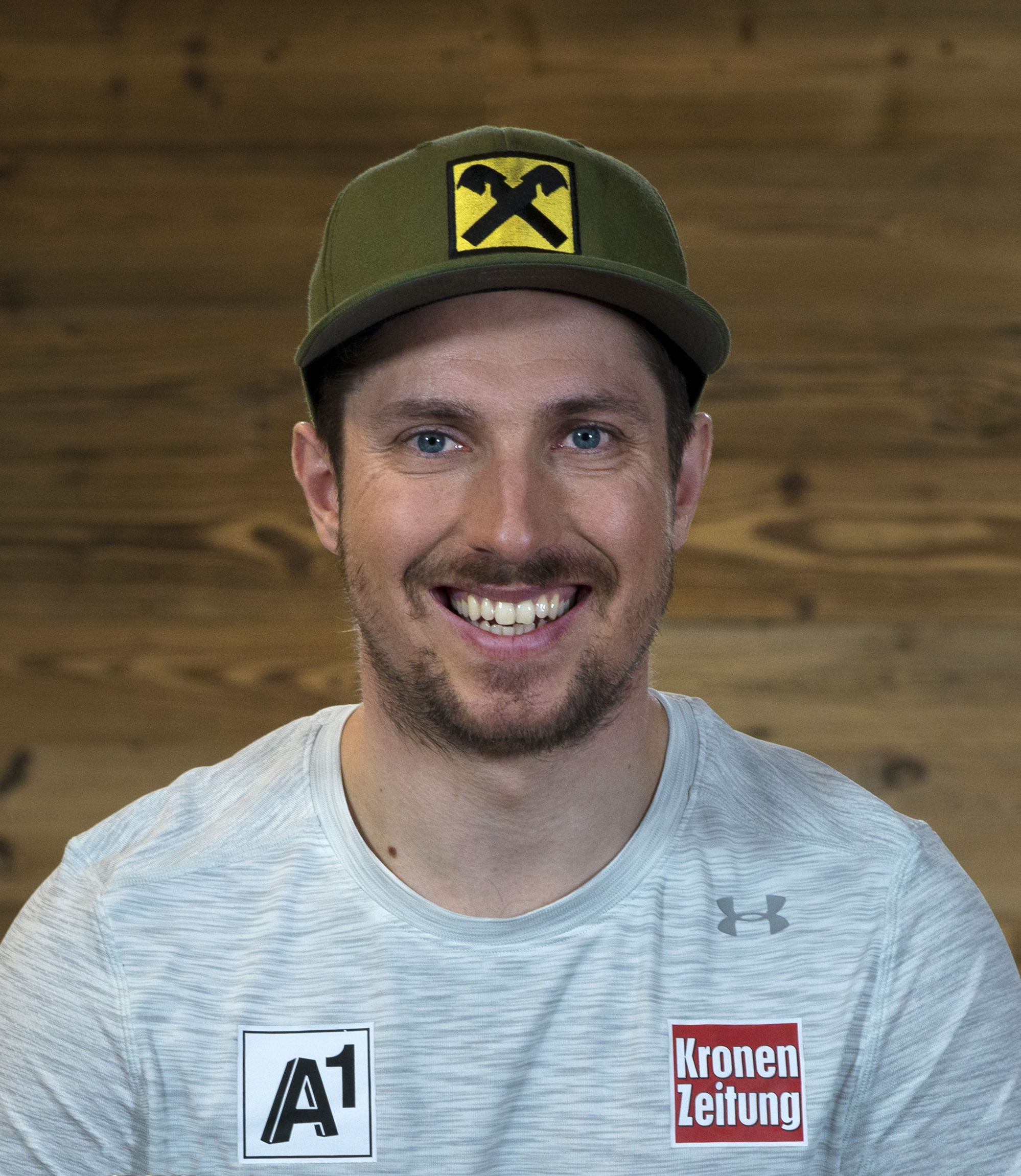
- Hirscher in March 2018

Personal information
- Born: 2 March 1989 (age 37) Hallein, Salzburg, Austria
- Height: 1.73 m (5 ft 8 in)
- Website: marcelhirscher.at

Skiing career
- Country: Netherlands (2024–); Austria (2007–2019)
- Sport: Alpine skiing
- Club: Skiklub Annaberg
- Retired: 4 September 2019 (age 30)
- Disciplines: Slalom, giant slalom, super-G, combined
- World Cup debut: 17 March 2007 (age 18)

Olympics
- Teams: 3 – (2010, 2014, 2018)
- Medals: 3 (2 gold)

World Championships
- Teams: 5 – (2009, 2013, 2015, 2017, 2019)
- Medals: 11 (7 gold)

World Cup
- Seasons: 12 – (2008–2019)
- Wins: 67
- Podiums: 138
- Overall titles: 8 – (2012–2019)
- Discipline titles: 12 – (6 SL, 6 GS)
Medal record
International alpine ski competitions
Event	1st	2nd	3rd
Olympic Games	2	1	0
World Championships	7	4	0
Total	9	5	0
World Cup race podiums
Event	1st	2nd	3rd
Slalom	32	24	9
Giant	31	18	10
Super G	1	0	2
Combined	0	4	2
Parallel	3	1	1
Total	67	47	24
Olympic Games
Gold medal – first place	2018 Pyeongchang	Combined
Gold medal – first place	2018 Pyeongchang	Giant slalom
Silver medal – second place	2014 Sochi	Slalom
World Championships
Gold medal – first place	2013 Schladming	Slalom
Gold medal – first place	2013 Schladming	Team event
Gold medal – first place	2015 Beaver Creek	Combined
Gold medal – first place	2015 Beaver Creek	Team event
Gold medal – first place	2017 St. Moritz	Giant slalom
Gold medal – first place	2017 St. Moritz	Slalom
Gold medal – first place	2019 Åre	Slalom
Silver medal – second place	2013 Schladming	Giant slalom
Silver medal – second place	2015 Beaver Creek	Giant slalom
Silver medal – second place	2017 St. Moritz	Combined
Silver medal – second place	2019 Åre	Giant slalom
Junior World Ski Championships
Gold medal – first place	2007 Flachau	Giant slalom
Gold medal – first place	2008 Formigal	Giant slalom
Gold medal – first place	2008 Formigal	Slalom
Silver medal – second place	2007 Flachau	Slalom
Silver medal – second place	2009 Garmisch	Super G
Bronze medal – third place	2009 Garmisch	Giant slalom

Marcel Hirscher (born 2 March 1989) is an Austrian-Dutch World Cup alpine ski racer. Hirscher made his World Cup debut in March 2007. He competed primarily in slalom and giant slalom, as well as combined and occasionally in super G. Winner of a record eight consecutive World Cup titles, Hirscher has also won 11 medals at the Alpine Skiing World Championships, seven of them gold, a silver medal in slalom at the 2014 Winter Olympics, and two gold medals in the combined and giant slalom at the 2018 Winter Olympics. Due to his record number of overall titles and many years of extreme dominance of both slalom and giant slalom, he is considered by many, including his former rivals Henrik Kristoffersen, Kjetil Jansrud and Alexis Pinturault, to be the best alpine skier in history. He won a total of 67 World Cup races, ranking second on the male all-time list.

== Career ==
At the 2010 Winter Olympics, Hirscher placed fourth in the giant slalom and fifth in the slalom at Whistler Creekside. He placed fourth in the giant slalom at the 2009 World Championships, but broke his ankle the weekend preceding the 2011 World Championships, which ended his 2011 season.

Returning after injury, Hirscher had an outstanding season in terms of wins in 2012, with 9 victories and a total of 14 podiums, all in the two technical events (except for one third place in the season's last super-G). He won the World Cup overall and giant slalom titles, and placed third in the slalom.

In October 2012, Hirscher was awarded the Skieur d'Or Award by members of the International Association of Ski Journalists for his performances during the previous season.

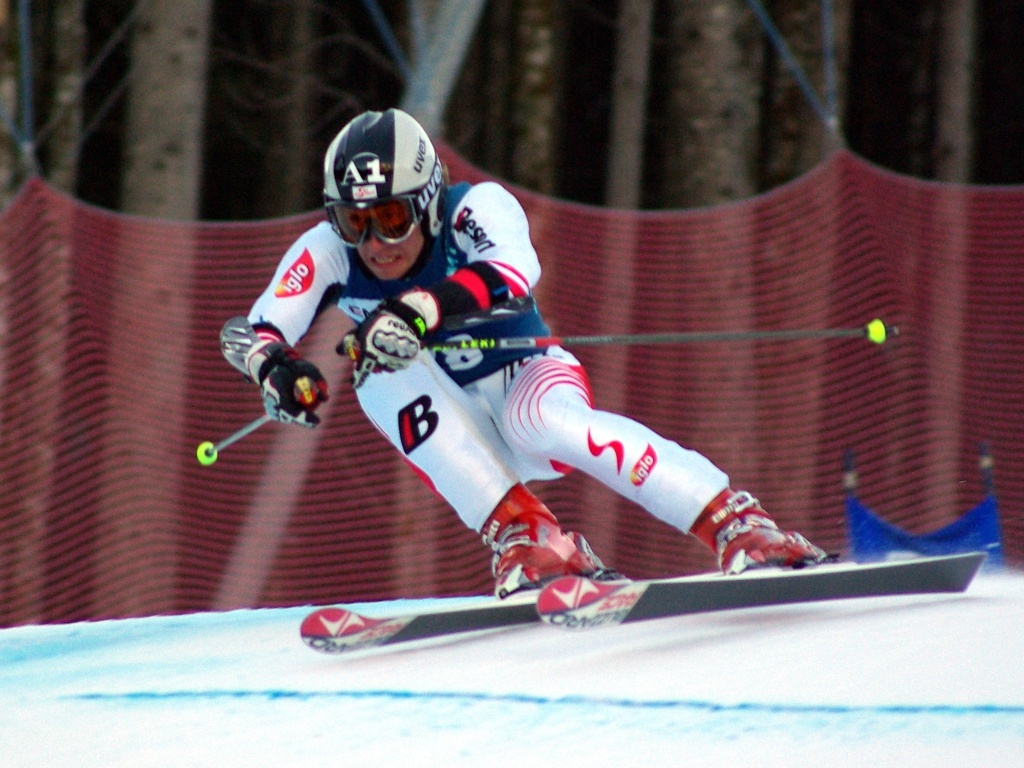
Hirscher in Hinterstoder on 11 January 2008

Hirscher won the overall World Cup title again in 2013 with 6 victories; he also won the slalom title and was runner-up in giant slalom. Hirscher scored a total of 18 podium finishes out of 19 races in the two technical events. The only race in either slalom or giant slalom where he finished outside the top 3 was the giant slalom in Adelboden. In that particular race Hirscher was leading after the first run, built up his advantage to over a second in the second run, but nearly fell several gates before the final, thus missing the win and finished only 16th. He became the first male racer to retain the overall World Cup title since fellow Austrian Stephan Eberharter in 2002 and 2003 and the first to win it three years in a row since American Phil Mahre did so in 1981, 1982 and 1983.

In 2015, Hirscher dominated the giant slalom standings with 5 wins, including a winning margin of 3.28 seconds in Garmisch, and won the GS title for the second time. With his slalom win in Zagreb he became the most successful Austrian male World Cup slalom skier surpassing Benjamin Raich. In the final race of the season in Meribel he overturned a 55-point deficit in the standings by winning his 16th World Cup slalom, and with it won the slalom title for the third year in a row. Hirscher became the first male alpine skier to win the overall World Cup title four times in a row.

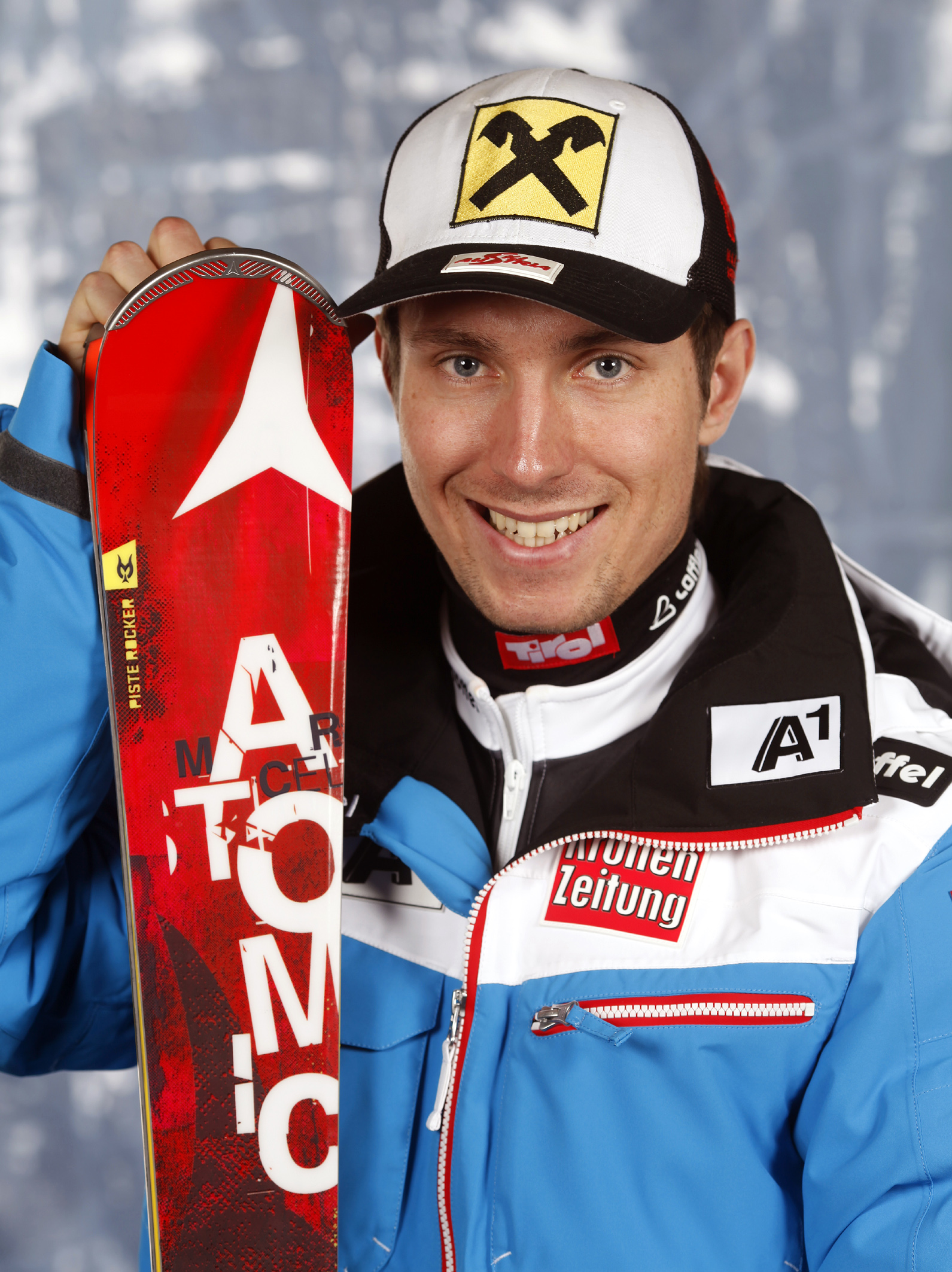

It's incredible how many emotions you feel when crossing the finish line and seeing that you are No. 1.

— Marcel Hirscher, 2012

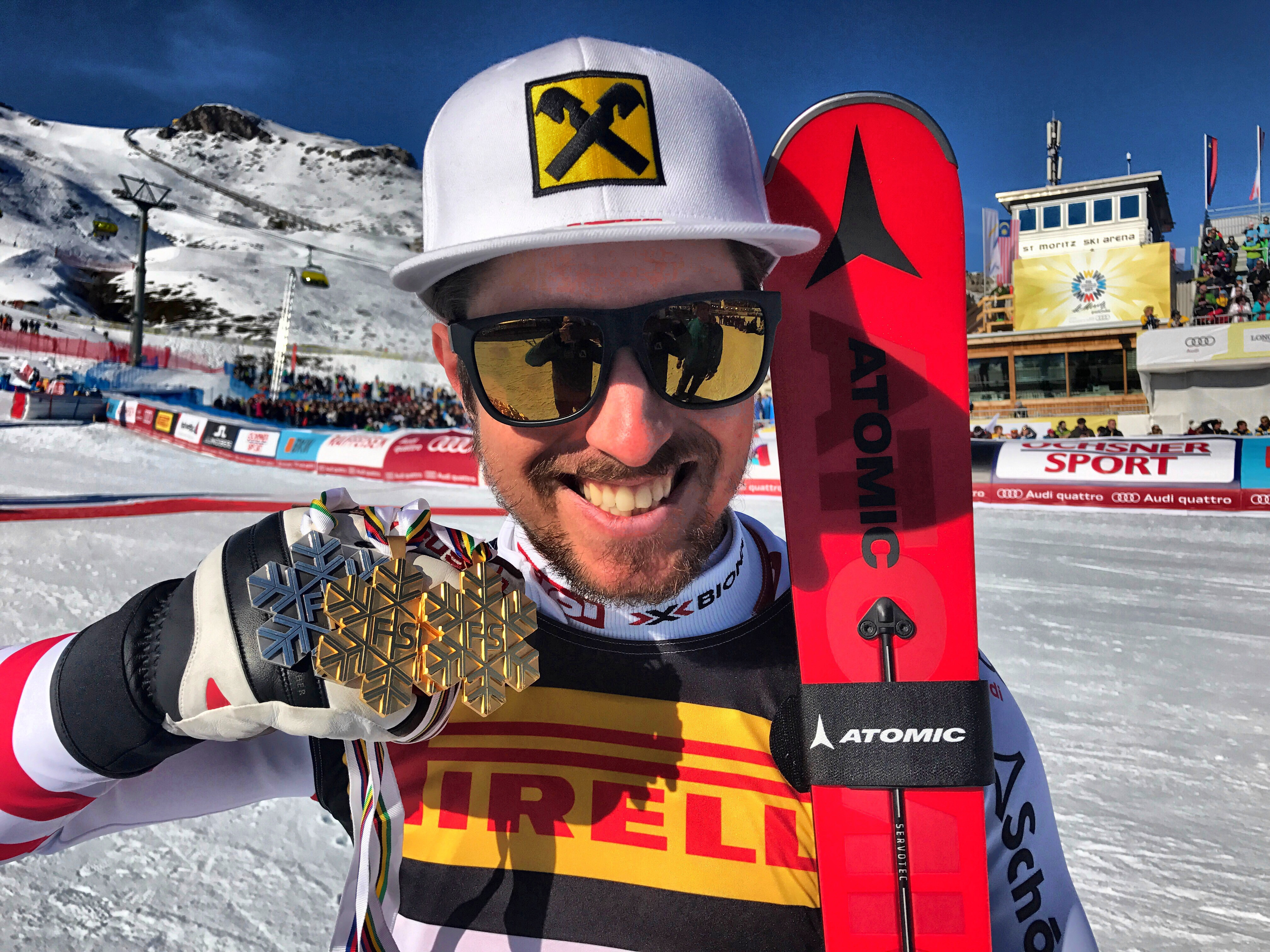
Hirscher in February 2017 (FIS Alpine World Ski Championships 2017)

In 2016, Hirscher became the most successful Austrian male World Cup GS skier by winning in Beaver Creek, Colorado, surpassing Benjamin Raich and Hermann Maier. With his GS win in Alta Badia, Italy (his 3rd consecutive win at that venue), he became Austria's most successful World Cup GS skier overtaking Annemarie Moser-Pröll. Another GS win in Kranjska Gora, Slovenia confirmed Hirscher as the GS title winner with one race to go. To wrap up an amazing season with 8 wins and 19 podiums Hirscher also won the men's overall World Cup title, his 5th consecutive overall title, a feat never before achieved by a male skier. His points total also enabled Austria to narrowly beat France in the men's nations cup by 201 points, the narrowest winning margin for many years. Hirscher was the only Austrian male skier to win a race in the entire season, and scored 30.9% (1,795 out of 5,804) of the Austrian men's nations cup points.

On 13 November in Levi, Finland, Hirscher won the first slalom of the 2017 season and equalled Pirmin Zurbriggen's win total of 40, putting him equal 5th in the standings. He also achieved his 93rd podium, surpassing Benjamin Raich's total. On 18 December he won the fourth giant slalom of the season in Alta Badia having finished second in the three preceding giant slalom races, equalling Alberto Tomba's 4 wins at the venue, and with it became the 5th most successful male World Cup winner. On 7 January Hirscher achieved his 100th podium from 191 starts (a ratio of 52.3%) with a 2nd-place finish in the giant slalom in Adelboden. On 29 January Hirscher won the GS in Garmisch, achieving his 20th GS and 43rd World Cup win, and with it attained Austria's 100th GS win for men.

At the FIS Alpine World Ski Championships 2017 in St. Moritz, Switzerland Hirscher won gold in the GS and slalom, and silver in the combined, missing the gold by just 0.01 seconds. He was the most successful athlete at the championships.

On 4 March in Kranjska Gora, Slovenia, Hirscher won his third GS race of the season and with it secured his 4th GS World Cup title and his 6th overall World Cup title; the only male skier in history to do so. One day later Hirscher finished fourth in the slalom and with it secured his fourth World Cup slalom title.

The start of the 2018 season was expected to be more difficult as Hirscher suffered a fracture to his left ankle during the first day of snow training on 17 August. Fortunately the first race of the season in Sölden was cancelled due to high winds, giving Hirscher a few more weeks to recover. He made a last minute decision to race the slalom in Levi on 12 November and achieved a 17th-place finish. The next technical race was the GS in Val d'Isère on 9 December and Hirscher came 3rd. He won the slalom the next day.

On 17 December 2017, Hirscher won the giant slalom race in Alta Badia, which was his fifth consecutive victory in that location, surpassing Ivica Kostelić, who won the Kitzbühel combined four times in a row.

On 4 January 2018, Hirscher achieved his fifth win of the season in the slalom in Zagreb and with it his 50th World Cup win, matching the total of legendary technical racer Alberto Tomba. Two days later Hirscher achieved his sixth win of the season by winning the GS in Adelboden and moved to 3rd overall in the men's World Cup winners rankings. The next day he won the slalom in Adelboden. On 23 January, with his 9th win of the season in the Schladming night slalom, Hirscher equalled his compatriot Austrian ski legend Hermann Maier's 54 World Cup victories. It was the 500th World Cup win for Austrian men. On 28 January Hirscher moved to second overall in the men's World Cup winners rankings by winning the GS in Garmisch-Partenkirchen.

At the 2018 Pyeongchang Winter Olympics, Hirscher won gold in the men's combined event, his first competition of the games. The win was not expected, as he had done little downhill training as a result of the pre season ankle injury. 5 days later he went on to win gold in the GS by 1.27 seconds, the biggest winning margin in Olympic GS since the 1968 Winter Olympics.

Following the Olympics, the World Cup technical races resumed in Kranjska Gora, Slovenia on 3 March with the GS. Hirscher secured the GS crystal globe for the 5th time by winning the race with a winning margin of 1.66 seconds. The following day, Hirscher also won the slalom with a winning margin of 1.22 seconds. As a result, he also won the slalom crystal globe for the 5th time, and the overall crystal globe for the seventh time in succession with 2 technical races remaining. His Olympic gold medals plus the additional crystal globes enabled him to reach the top of the standings in the greatest alpine skiers of all time men's super ranking. At the end of the slalom race, Hirscher said on Austrian television that he would go home "and consider where the journey will go. I don't know if I will be skiing World Cup next season".

At the World Cup finals in Åre, Hirscher won the GS race on 17 March and equaled the record of most wins in a single season: he shares the record of 13 wins with alpine skiing legends Ingemar Stenmark and Hermann Maier. Unfortunately, the following day the slalom race was cancelled due to high winds, denying Hirscher the opportunity to obtain the record outright. Hirscher has started 245 World Cup races, has won 67 of them, (a ratio of 27%) has achieved 138 podiums (a ratio of 56%) and has finished 73% of his races in the Top 10.

In December 2018, Hirscher became Austria's most prolific World Cup race winner when he won a slalom in Saalbach-Hinterglemm in his native state of Salzburg, his 63rd World Cup victory, taking him past the previous record holder Annemarie Moser-Pröll. He took a total of 14 World Cup wins in 2018, breaking the previous record for most World Cup race wins in a single calendar year set by Ingemar Stenmark, but was eclipsed by Mikaela Shiffrin, who set a new record by winning 15 World Cup events during 2018. He was named as a L'Équipe Champion of Champions for 2018, as well as Eurosport's Sportsman of the Year.

On 13 January 2019, Hirscher won the slalom race in Adelboden and celebrated a 9th World Cup win and a 16th podium, a record among male athletes at a single resort. At the 2019 Alpine World Ski Championships in Åre in February, Hirscher took a silver in the giant slalom behind Henrik Kristoffersen, before winning the slalom by 0.65 seconds after holding a 0.56 second lead from the first run: Hirscher described his first run as one of the best performances of his career. He led teammates Michael Matt and Marco Schwarz in a clean sweep of the podium places, taking Austria's only gold of the championships, and preventing them from leaving a Worlds without a gold medal for the first time since 1987. It was Hirscher's seventh World Championship gold, tying him with compatriot Toni Sailer for the record number of Worlds golds won. Hirscher subsequently told the media that he would assess his future at the end of the season, but also stated that he thought that these were his last Worlds.

On 4 September 2019, Hirscher announced his retirement from alpine skiing. After his retirement, Hirscher was a presenter for an Austrian TV show. Despite videos of him training in a racing suit that circulated in December 2020, Hirscher insisted that he was not returning to competitive skiing.

In 2021, Hirscher developed and launched a brand of skis called Van Deer, that was later renamed to Van Deer-Red Bull Sports in a partnership with Red Bull. The brand debuted competitively in the 2022–23 World Cup season; however, due to the involvement of Red Bull in the new brand logo, there is currently an ongoing dispute between FIS and Van Deer-Red Bull about representing the brand in the official entries and results, and the brand logo is covered up by black tape during the events. Despite the disagreement, Hirscher's brand has quickly achieved success with former rival Henrik Kristoffersen, who scored a podium in the opening race at Sölden using the skis and earned Van Deer-Red Bull's first victory in Garmisch-Partenkirchen later in the season.

On 24 April 2024, Hirscher announced he was planning a comeback to the FIS Alpine World Cup circuit competing for the Netherlands, the homeland of his mother.

Hirscher made his anticipated World Cup return for the Netherlands on 27 October 2024, having earned eight points for his 23rd-place result in the season-opening giant slalom at Sölden. This was the first race since Maarten Meiners in January 2022 in which a Dutch competitor earned World Cup points.

On 3 December 2024, Hirscher suffered a torn anterior cruciate ligament during giant slalom training at Reiteralm, ending his season prematurely. He returned to training in September 2025 with the aims of competing at the 2026 Winter Olympics, however Hirscher then announced in an Instagram post on 9 January 2026 that he was not yet ready to compete in the World Cup and would sit out the entire 2025–26 World Cup season.

== World Cup results ==
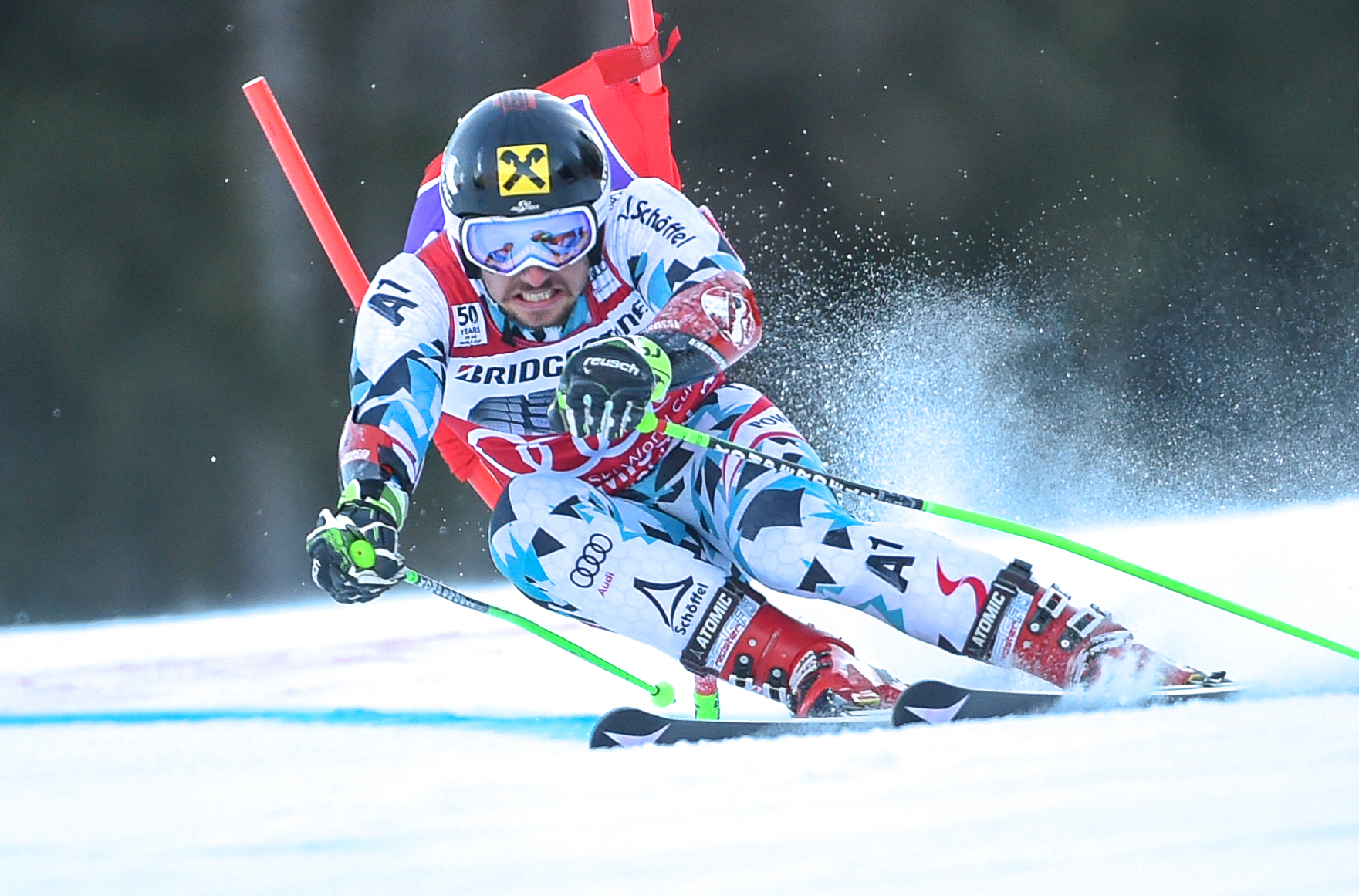
Hirscher during the giant slalom in Garmisch-Partenkirchen

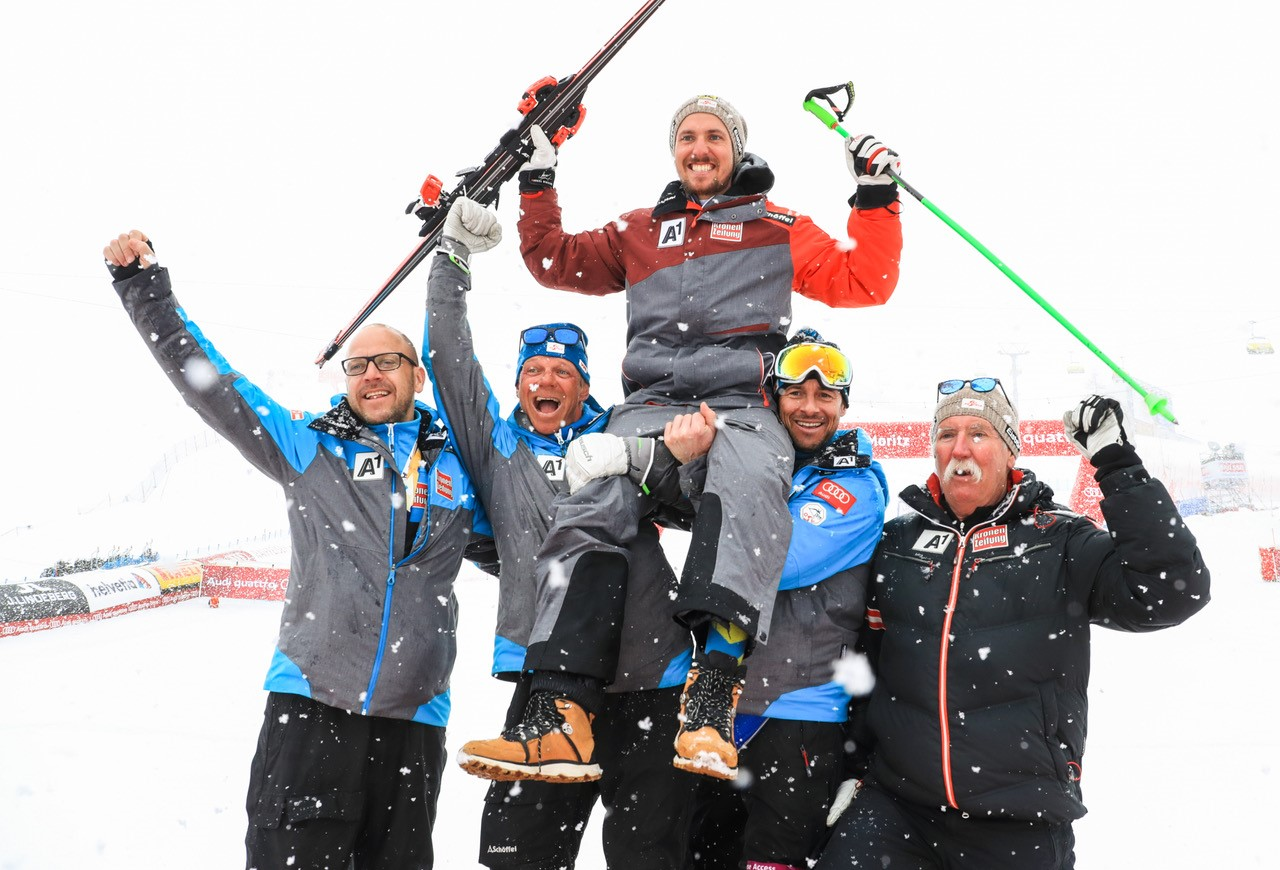
Marcel Hirscher with Stefan Illek, Michael Pircher, Josef Percht and Ferdinand Hirscher

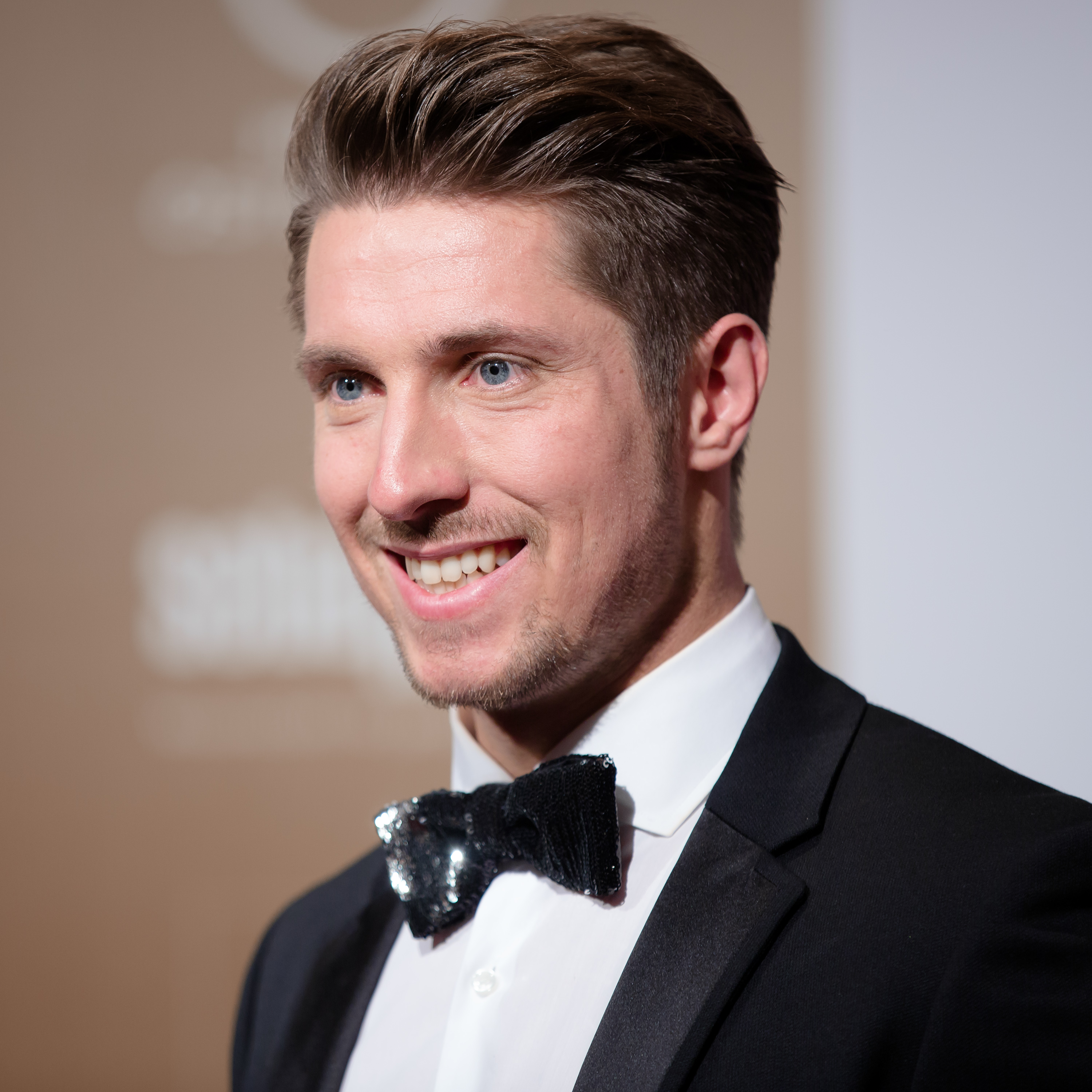
Hirscher at the gala for the Austrian Sportspersonalities of the Year 2015

=== Season titles ===
- 20 titles – (8 overall, 6 giant slalom, 6 slalom)

Season	
Season	Discipline
2012	Overall
2012	Giant slalom
2013	Overall
2013	Slalom
2014	Overall
2014	Slalom
2015	Overall
2015	Giant slalom
2015	Slalom
2016	Overall
2016	Giant slalom
2017	Overall
2017	Giant slalom
2017	Slalom
2018	Overall
2018	Giant slalom
2018	Slalom
2019	Overall
2019	Giant slalom
2019	Slalom

=== Season standings ===
Season
Season	Age	Overall	Slalom	Giant slalom	Super G	Downhill	Combined	Total points
2008	18	51	15	60	–	–	–	167
2009	19	14	9	14	52	–	10	520
2010	20	6	8	6	34	–	12	691
2011	21	15	5	10	–	–	–	469
2012	22	1st place, gold medalist(s)	3rd place, bronze medalist(s)	1st place, gold medalist(s)	27	–	–	1355
2013	23	1st place, gold medalist(s)	1st place, gold medalist(s)	2nd place, silver medalist(s)	–	–	–	1535
2014	24	1st place, gold medalist(s)	1st place, gold medalist(s)	2nd place, silver medalist(s)	31	–	8	1222
2015	25	1st place, gold medalist(s)	1st place, gold medalist(s)	1st place, gold medalist(s)	24	–	6	1448
2016	26	1st place, gold medalist(s)	2nd place, silver medalist(s)	1st place, gold medalist(s)	6	–	–	1795
2017	27	1st place, gold medalist(s)	1st place, gold medalist(s)	1st place, gold medalist(s)	25	–	5	1599
2018	28	1st place, gold medalist(s)	1st place, gold medalist(s)	1st place, gold medalist(s)	33	–	–	1620
2019	29	1st place, gold medalist(s)	1st place, gold medalist(s)	1st place, gold medalist(s)	–	–	5	1546
2020-2024	did not run							
2025	35	142	–	50	–	–	–	8

== Career statistics ==
=== Race victories ===
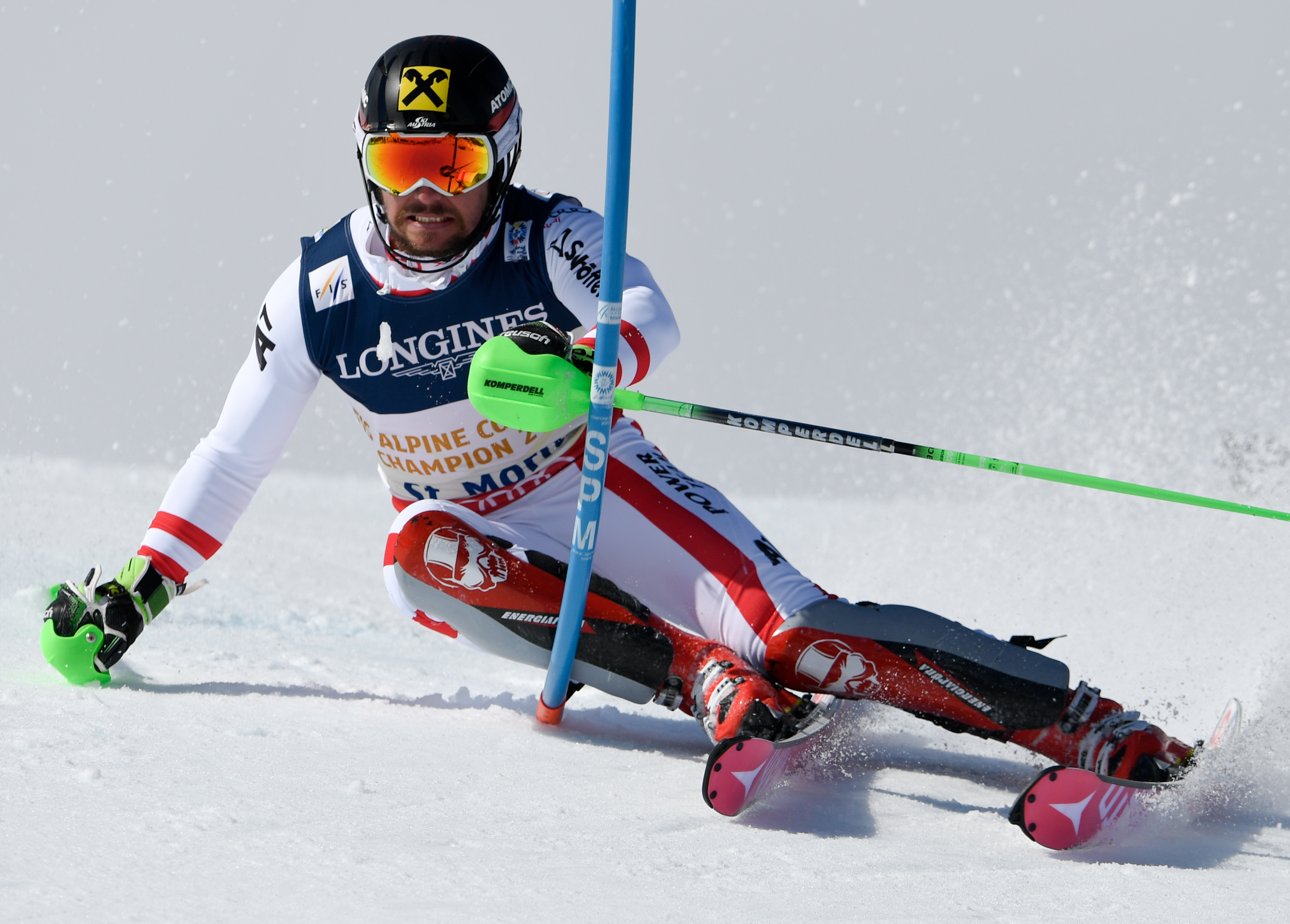
During the combined slalom at the 2017 World Championships

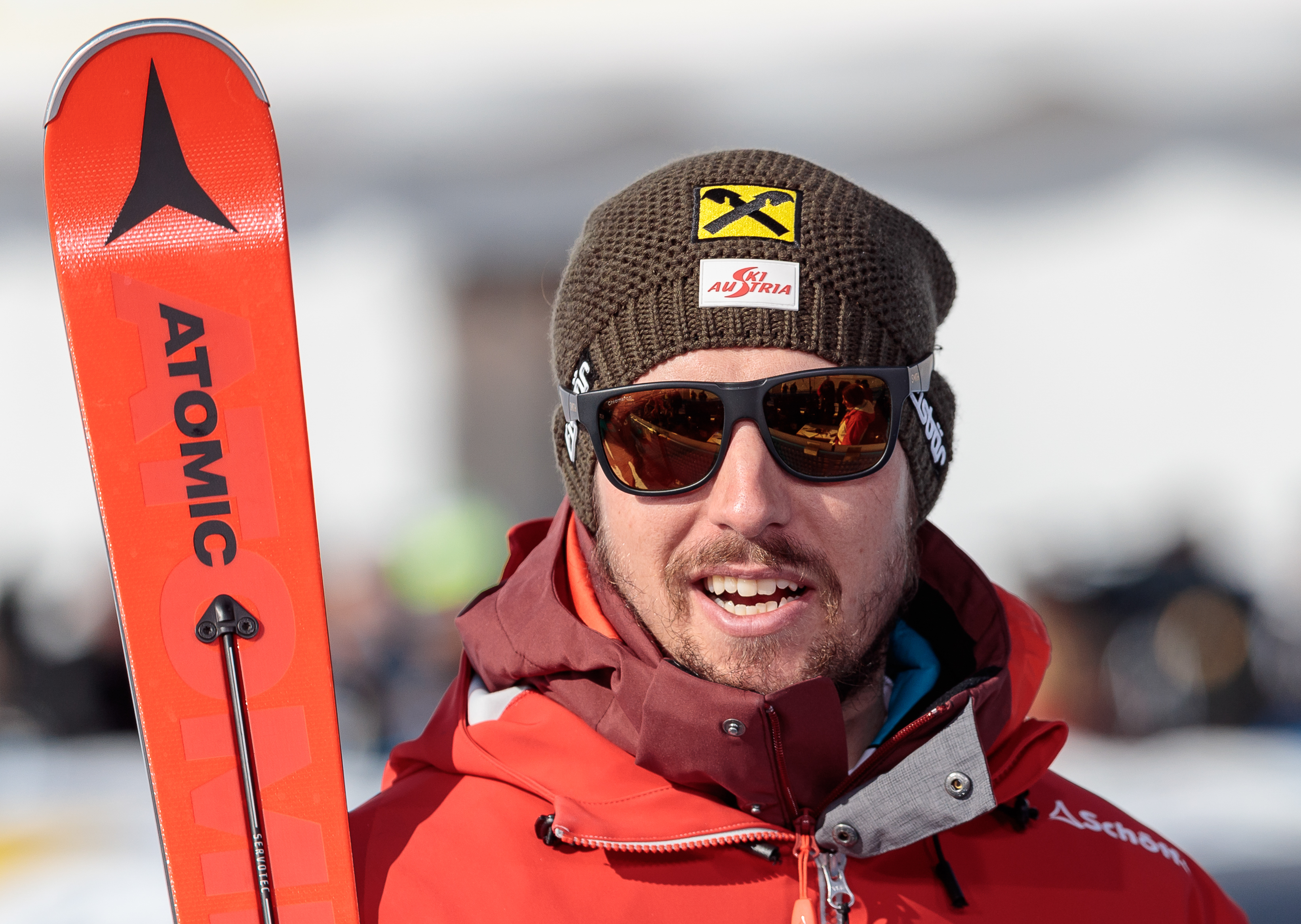
Hirscher in February 2017

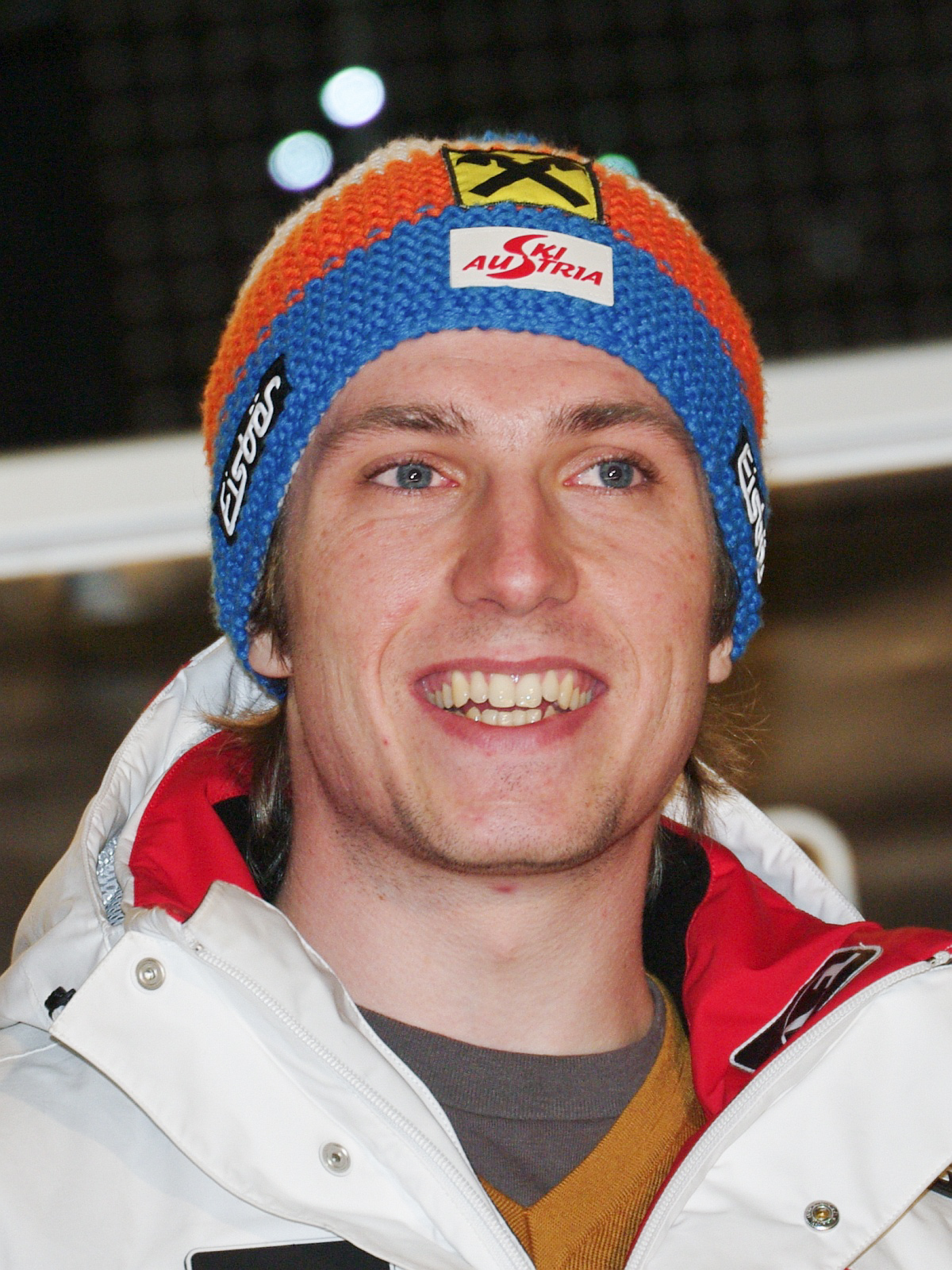
Hirscher in February 2011

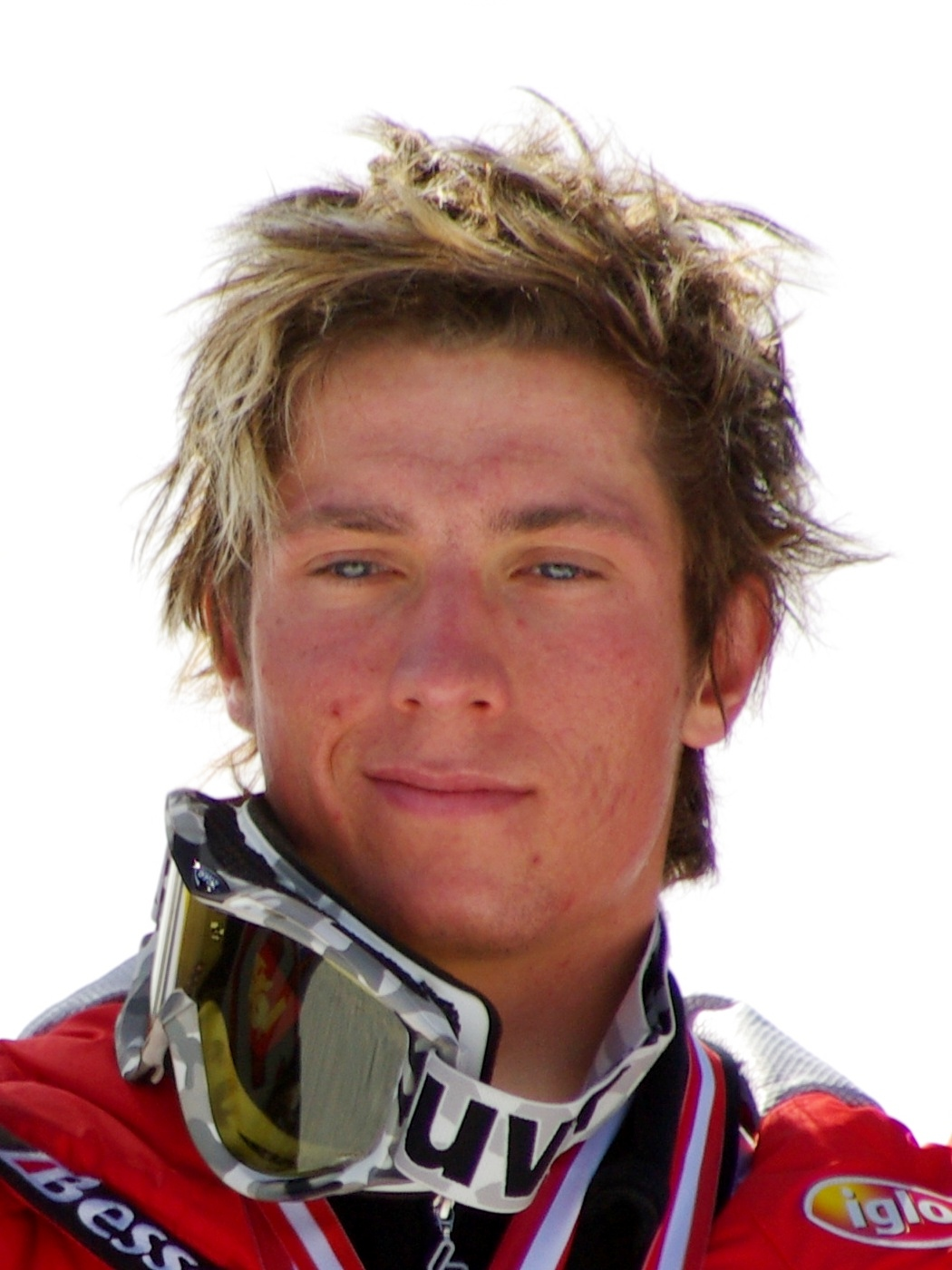
Hirscher in March 2008

	Slalom	Giant slalom	Super G	Combined	Parallel	Total
Wins	32	31	1	0	3	67
Podiums	65	59	3	6	5	138

Season
Season	Date	Location	Discipline
2010; 2 victories (2 GS)	13 December 2009	Val-d'Isère, France	Giant slalom
2010; 2 victories (2 GS)	30 January 2010	Kranjska Gora, Slovenia	Giant slalom
2011; 1 victory (1 SL)	12 December 2010	Val-d'Isère, France	Slalom
2012; 9 victories (5 SL, 4 GS)	4 December 2011	(United States) Beaver Creek, USA	Giant slalom
2012; 9 victories (5 SL, 4 GS)	19 December 2011	Alta Badia, Italy	Slalom
2012; 9 victories (5 SL, 4 GS)	5 January 2012	Zagreb Sljeme, Croatia	Slalom
2012; 9 victories (5 SL, 4 GS)	7 January 2012	Adelboden, Switzerland	Giant slalom
2012; 9 victories (5 SL, 4 GS)	8 January 2012	Adelboden, Switzerland	Slalom
2012; 9 victories (5 SL, 4 GS)	24 January 2012	Schladming, Austria	Slalom
2012; 9 victories (5 SL, 4 GS)	18 February 2012	Bansko, Bulgaria	Giant slalom
2012; 9 victories (5 SL, 4 GS)	19 February 2012	Bansko, Bulgaria	Slalom
2012; 9 victories (5 SL, 4 GS)	17 March 2012	Schladming, Austria	Giant slalom
2013; 6 victories (4 SL, 1 GS, 1 PS)	9 December 2012	Val-d'Isère, France	Giant slalom
2013; 6 victories (4 SL, 1 GS, 1 PS)	18 December 2012	Madonna di Campiglio, Italy	Slalom
2013; 6 victories (4 SL, 1 GS, 1 PS)	6 January 2013	Zagreb Sljeme, Croatia	Slalom
2013; 6 victories (4 SL, 1 GS, 1 PS)	13 January 2013	Adelboden, Switzerland	Slalom
2013; 6 victories (4 SL, 1 GS, 1 PS)	27 January 2013	Kitzbühel, Austria	Slalom
2013; 6 victories (4 SL, 1 GS, 1 PS)	29 January 2013	Moscow, Russia	Parallel slalom
2014; 5 victories (3 SL, 2 GS)	17 November 2013	Levi, Finland	Slalom
2014; 5 victories (3 SL, 2 GS)	14 December 2013	Val-d'Isère, France	Giant slalom
2014; 5 victories (3 SL, 2 GS)	22 December 2013	Alta Badia, Italy	Giant slalom
2014; 5 victories (3 SL, 2 GS)	12 January 2014	Adelboden, Switzerland	Slalom
2014; 5 victories (3 SL, 2 GS)	16 March 2014	Lenzerheide, Switzerland	Slalom
2015; 8 victories (3 SL, 5 GS)	26 October 2014	Sölden, Austria	Giant slalom
2015; 8 victories (3 SL, 5 GS)	12 December 2014	Åre, Sweden	Giant slalom
2015; 8 victories (3 SL, 5 GS)	14 December 2014	Åre, Sweden	Slalom
2015; 8 victories (3 SL, 5 GS)	21 December 2014	Alta Badia, Italy	Giant slalom
2015; 8 victories (3 SL, 5 GS)	6 January 2015	Zagreb Sljeme, Croatia	Slalom
2015; 8 victories (3 SL, 5 GS)	10 January 2015	Adelboden, Switzerland	Giant slalom
2015; 8 victories (3 SL, 5 GS)	1 March 2015	Garmisch-Partenkirchen, Germany	Giant slalom
2015; 8 victories (3 SL, 5 GS)	22 March 2015	Méribel, France	Slalom
2016; 8 victories (2 SL, 4 GS, 1 PS, 1 SG)	5 December 2015	(United States) Beaver Creek, USA	Super-G
2016; 8 victories (2 SL, 4 GS, 1 PS, 1 SG)	6 December 2015	(United States) Beaver Creek, USA	Giant slalom
2016; 8 victories (2 SL, 4 GS, 1 PS, 1 SG)	12 December 2015	Val-d'Isère, France	Giant slalom
2016; 8 victories (2 SL, 4 GS, 1 PS, 1 SG)	20 December 2015	Alta Badia, Italy	Giant slalom
2016; 8 victories (2 SL, 4 GS, 1 PS, 1 SG)	6 January 2016	Santa Caterina Valfurva, Italy	Slalom
2016; 8 victories (2 SL, 4 GS, 1 PS, 1 SG)	23 February 2016	Stockholm, Sweden	Parallel slalom
2016; 8 victories (2 SL, 4 GS, 1 PS, 1 SG)	5 March 2016	Kranjska Gora, Slovenia	Giant slalom
2016; 8 victories (2 SL, 4 GS, 1 PS, 1 SG)	6 March 2016	Kranjska Gora, Slovenia	Slalom
2017; 6 victories (2 SL, 4 GS)	13 November 2016	Levi, Finland	Slalom
2017; 6 victories (2 SL, 4 GS)	18 December 2016	Alta Badia, Italy	Giant slalom
2017; 6 victories (2 SL, 4 GS)	22 January 2017	Kitzbühel, Austria	Slalom
2017; 6 victories (2 SL, 4 GS)	29 January 2017	Garmisch-Partenkirchen, Germany	Giant slalom
2017; 6 victories (2 SL, 4 GS)	4 March 2017	Kranjska Gora, Slovenia	Giant slalom
2017; 6 victories (2 SL, 4 GS)	18 March 2017	(United States) Aspen, USA	Giant slalom
2018; 13 victories (7 SL, 6 GS)	3 December 2017	(United States) Beaver Creek, USA	Giant slalom
2018; 13 victories (7 SL, 6 GS)	10 December 2017	Val-d'Isère, France	Slalom
2018; 13 victories (7 SL, 6 GS)	17 December 2017	Alta Badia, Italy	Giant slalom
2018; 13 victories (7 SL, 6 GS)	22 December 2017	Madonna di Campiglio, Italy	Slalom
2018; 13 victories (7 SL, 6 GS)	4 January 2018	Zagreb Sljeme, Croatia	Slalom
2018; 13 victories (7 SL, 6 GS)	6 January 2018	Adelboden, Switzerland	Giant slalom
2018; 13 victories (7 SL, 6 GS)	7 January 2018	Adelboden, Switzerland	Slalom
2018; 13 victories (7 SL, 6 GS)	14 January 2018	Wengen, Switzerland	Slalom
2018; 13 victories (7 SL, 6 GS)	23 January 2018	Schladming, Austria	Slalom
2018; 13 victories (7 SL, 6 GS)	28 January 2018	Garmisch-Partenkirchen, Germany	Giant slalom
2018; 13 victories (7 SL, 6 GS)	3 March 2018	Kranjska Gora, Slovenia	Giant slalom
2018; 13 victories (7 SL, 6 GS)	4 March 2018	Kranjska Gora, Slovenia	Slalom
2018; 13 victories (7 SL, 6 GS)	17 March 2018	Åre, Sweden	Giant slalom
2019; 9 victories (5 SL, 3 GS, 1 PGS)	18 November 2018	Levi, Finland	Slalom
2019; 9 victories (5 SL, 3 GS, 1 PGS)	8 December 2018	Val-d'Isère, France	Giant slalom
2019; 9 victories (5 SL, 3 GS, 1 PGS)	16 December 2018	Alta Badia, Italy	Giant slalom
2019; 9 victories (5 SL, 3 GS, 1 PGS)	17 December 2018	Alta Badia, Italy	Parallel giant slalom
2019; 9 victories (5 SL, 3 GS, 1 PGS)	20 December 2018	Saalbach-Hinterglemm, Austria	Slalom
2019; 9 victories (5 SL, 3 GS, 1 PGS)	6 January 2019	Zagreb Sljeme, Croatia	Slalom
2019; 9 victories (5 SL, 3 GS, 1 PGS)	12 January 2019	Adelboden, Switzerland	Giant slalom
2019; 9 victories (5 SL, 3 GS, 1 PGS)	13 January 2019	Adelboden, Switzerland	Slalom
2019; 9 victories (5 SL, 3 GS, 1 PGS)	29 January 2019	Schladming, Austria	Slalom

=== Podiums ===
Season	Podiums																		
Season	Super G			Giant slalom			Slalom			Parallel^{[1]}			Combined			Total			
Season	1st place, gold medalist(s)	2nd place, silver medalist(s)	3rd place, bronze medalist(s)	1st place, gold medalist(s)	2nd place, silver medalist(s)	3rd place, bronze medalist(s)	1st place, gold medalist(s)	2nd place, silver medalist(s)	3rd place, bronze medalist(s)	1st place, gold medalist(s)	2nd place, silver medalist(s)	3rd place, bronze medalist(s)	1st place, gold medalist(s)	2nd place, silver medalist(s)	3rd place, bronze medalist(s)	1st place, gold medalist(s)	2nd place, silver medalist(s)	3rd place, bronze medalist(s)	Σ
2008									2									2	2
2009															1			1	1
2010				2	1			2						1		2	4		6
2011						1	1	2								1	2	1	4
2012			1	4	2	1	5		1							9	2	3	14
2013				1	5	1	4	4	1	1	1					6	10	2	18
2014				2	1	3	3	2	1						1	5	3	5	13
2015				5	1	1	3	2	1					1		8	4	2	14
2016	1		1	4	2	2	2	6		1						8	8	3	19
2017				4	4		2	4	1					1		6	9	1	16
2018				6		1	7	1				1				13	1	2	16
2019				3	2		5	1	2	1				1		9	4	2	15
Total	1	0	2	31	18	10	32	24	9	3	1	1	0	4	2	67	47	24	138
Total	3			59			65			5			6			138			138

^{1} Including both parallel slalom and parallel giant slalom. Two parallel events have been classified in the sk-db.com results as classic events (the City Event slalom on 23/02/16 and the parallel GS on 18/12/17). They are shown here as parallel events.

== World Championships results ==
Year
Year	Age	Slalom	Giant slalom	Super G	Downhill	Combined	Team Event
2009	19	DSQ1	4	—	—	DNF2	cancelled
2011	21	injured: did not compete					
2013	23	1	2	—	—	—	1
2015	25	DNF2	2	—	—	1	1
2017	27	1	1	21	—	2	5
2019	29	1	2	—	—	—	—

== Olympic results ==
Year
Year	Age	Slalom	Giant slalom	Super G	Downhill	Combined
2010	20	5	4	—	—	—
2014	24	2	4	—	—	—
2018	28	DNF1	1	—	—	1

== Personal life ==
Hirscher is a dual citizen of the Netherlands and Austria as he was born to a Dutch mother Sylvia (née De Vlieg) and an Austrian father Ferdinand who met on a ski holiday in Austria.

In June 2018, Hirscher married Laura Moisl, his long-time girlfriend. On 7 October 2018, they celebrated the birth of their first child, a son. On 1 August 2021, the Austrian newspaper Kronen Zeitung reported that the couple, who have two children together, had separated after twelve years.

== See also ==
- Ski World Cup Most podiums & Top 10 results

Preceded by Roger Federer & Rafael Nadal	L'Équipe Champion of Champions; 2018	Succeeded by Rafael Nadal
