= 2011–12 FIS Alpine Ski World Cup =

International sports competition

FIS Alpine Ski World Cup 2011/12
Discipline	Men	Women
Overall	(Austria) Marcel Hirscher	(United States) Lindsey Vonn
Downhill	(Austria) Klaus Kröll	(United States) Lindsey Vonn
Super-G	(Norway) Aksel Lund Svindal	(United States) Lindsey Vonn
Giant slalom	(Austria) Marcel Hirscher	(Germany) Viktoria Rebensburg
Slalom	(Sweden) André Myhrer	(Austria) Marlies Schild
Super combined	(Croatia) Ivica Kostelić	(United States) Lindsey Vonn
Nations Cup	Austria	Austria
- Nations Cup Overall: Austria

Competition
Locations	21	20
Individual	44	37
Mixed	1	1
Cancelled	1	3
Rescheduled	6	8

2012 World Cup Champions

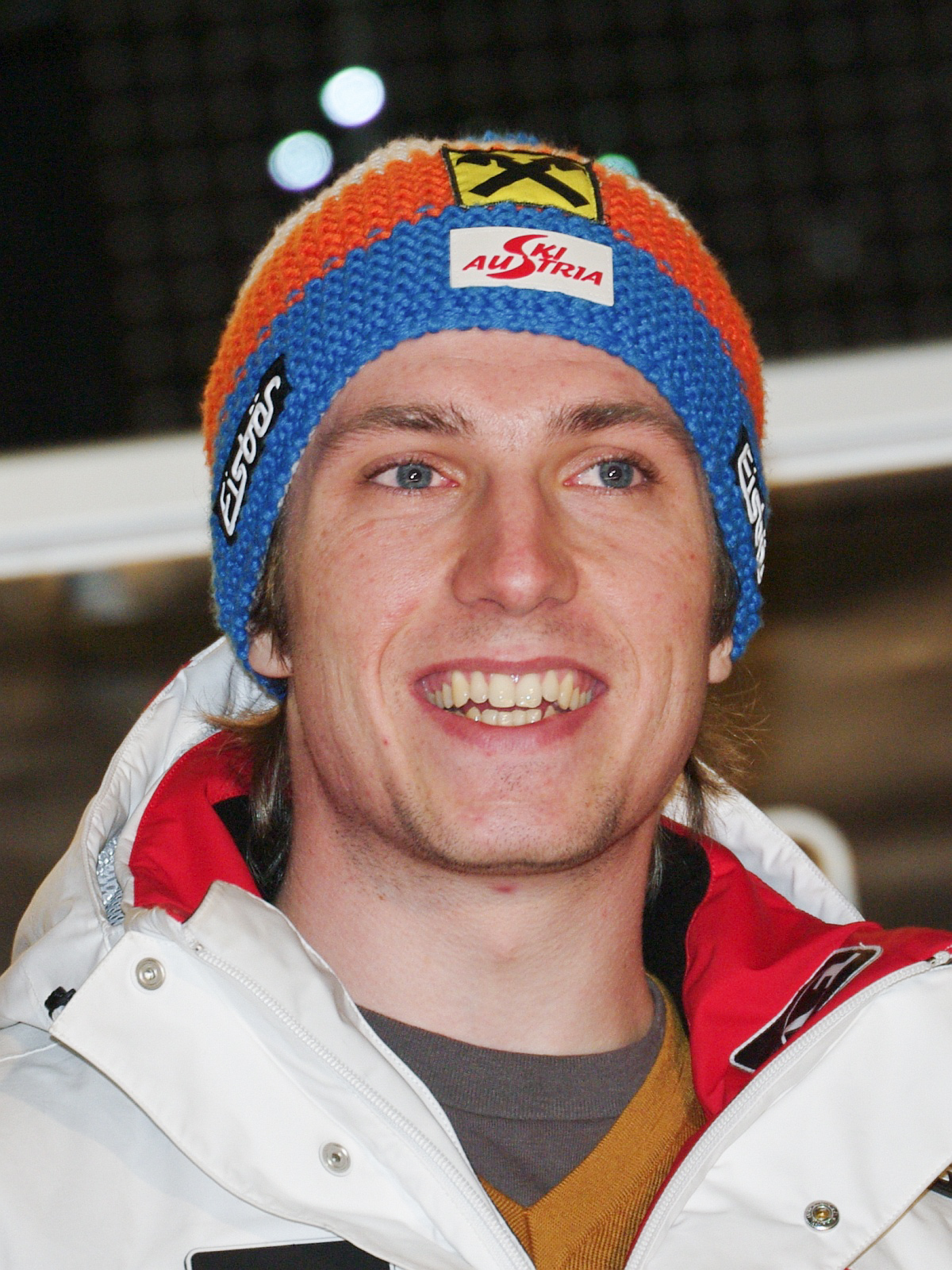
Marcel Hirscher won his first overall title.

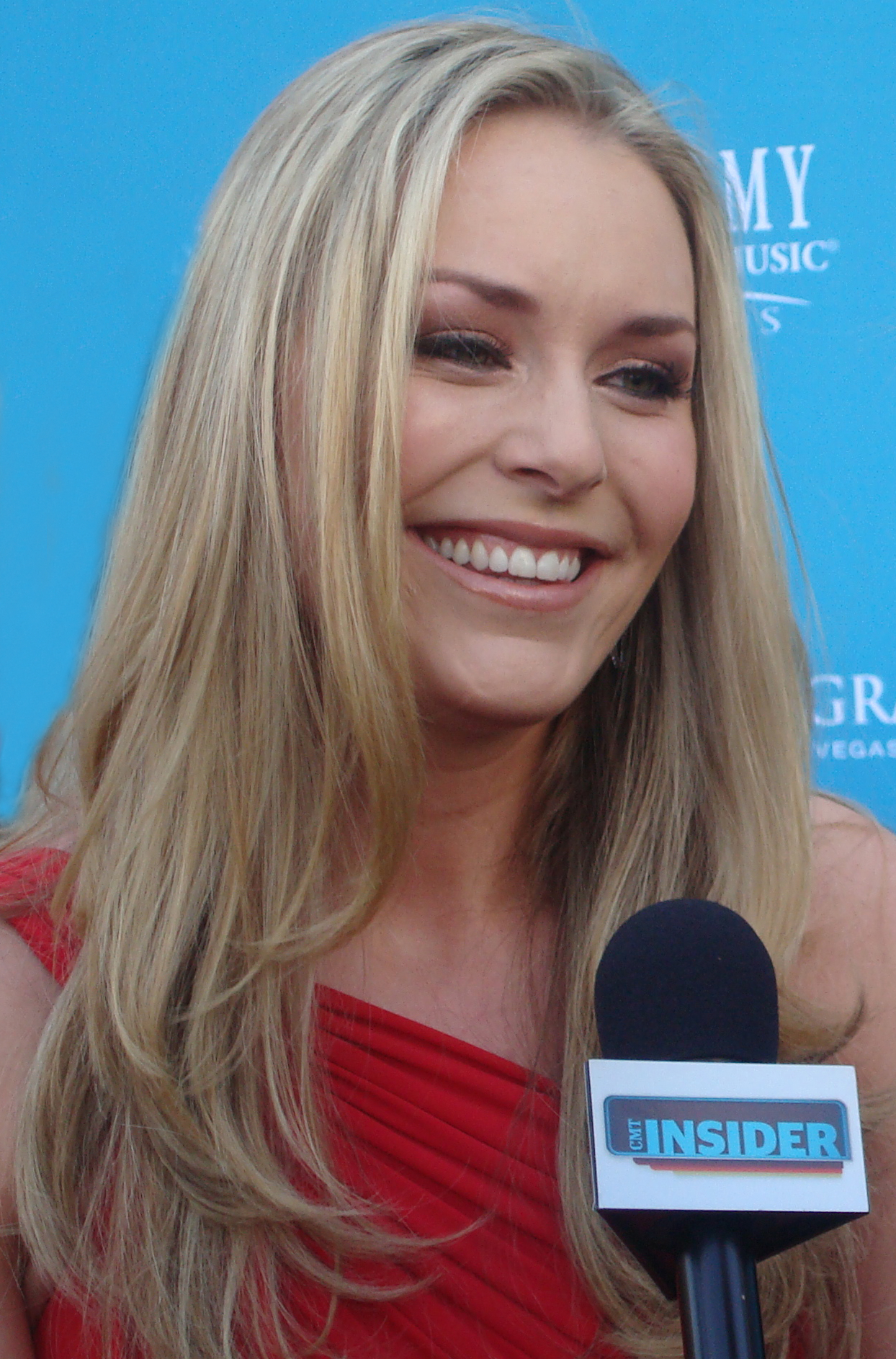
Lindsey Vonn became only the second female to win at least four overall World Cup titles, after Annemarie Moser-Pröll.

The 46th World Cup season began on 22 October 2011, in Sölden, Austria, and concluded on 18 March 2012, at the World Cup finals in Schladming, Austria.

Two pre-Olympic races took place at Rosa Khutor, the alpine venue for the 2014 Winter Olympics in Sochi. Two city events, first held as a part of World Cup in the 2011 season, were scheduled for Munich and Moscow, but the Munich event was cancelled due to warm temperatures.

Lindsey Vonn won her fourth overall women's title in five years, clinching it with a giant slalom win on 9 March at Åre, Sweden. Vonn's title put her second on the all-time list behind Annemarie Moser-Pröll's tally of six titles. The men's overall title went to the final event at Schladming, where Austria's Marcel Hirscher prevailed over Switzerland's Beat Feuz.

== Calendar ==
=== Men ===
Event key: DH – Downhill, SL – Slalom, GS – Giant slalom, SG – Super giant slalom, KB – Classic Combined, SC – Super combined, CE – City Event (Parallel)
Race	Season	Date	Place	Type	Winner	Second	Third	Details
1444	1	23 October 2011	(Austria) Sölden	GS _{347}	(United States) Ted Ligety	(France) Alexis Pinturault	(Austria) Philipp Schörghofer	
		13 November 2011	(Finland) Levi	SL _{cnx}	lack of snow; replaced in Flachau 21 December 2011			
1445	2	26 November 2011	(Canada) Lake Louise	DH _{414}	(Switzerland) Didier Cuche	(Switzerland) Beat Feuz	(Austria) Hannes Reichelt	
1446	3	27 November 2011	(Canada) Lake Louise	SG _{159}	(Norway) Aksel Lund Svindal	(Switzerland) Didier Cuche	(France) Adrien Théaux	
1447	4	2 December 2011	(United States) Beaver Creek	DH _{415}	(United States) Bode Miller	(Switzerland) Beat Feuz	(Austria) Klaus Kröll	
1448	5	3 December 2011	(United States) Beaver Creek	SG _{160}	(Switzerland) Sandro Viletta	(Norway) Aksel Lund Svindal	(Switzerland) Beat Feuz	
1449	6	4 December 2011	(United States) Beaver Creek	GS _{348}	(Austria) Marcel Hirscher	(United States) Ted Ligety	(Germany) Fritz Dopfer	
1450	7	(Note: Giant slalom from Val-d'Isère was rescheduled to Beaver Creek on 6 December 2011.)6 December 2011	(United States) Beaver Creek	GS _{349}	(United States) Ted Ligety	(Austria) Marcel Hirscher	(Norway) Kjetil Jansrud	
1451	8	(Note: Slalom from Val-d'Isère was rescheduled to Beaver Creek on 8 December 2011)8 December 2011	(United States) Beaver Creek	SL _{411}	(Croatia) Ivica Kostelić	(Italy) Cristian Deville	(Austria) Marcel Hirscher	
		10 December 2011	(France) Val-d'Isère	GS _{cnx}	lack of snow; replaced in Beaver Creek 6 December 2011			
		11 December 2011	(France) Val-d'Isère	SL _{cnx}	lack of snow; replaced in Beaver Creek on 8 December 2011			
1452	9	16 December 2011	(Italy) Val Gardena	SG _{161}	(Switzerland) Beat Feuz	(United States) Bode Miller	(Norway) Kjetil Jansrud	
		17 December 2011	(Italy) Val Gardena	DH _{cnx}	cancelled after 21 skiers, strong winds; replaced in Chamonix on 3 February 2012			
1453	10	18 December 2011	(Italy) Alta Badia	GS _{350}	(Italy) Massimiliano Blardone	(Austria) Hannes Reichelt	(Austria) Philipp Schörghofer	
1454	11	19 December 2011	(Italy) Alta Badia	SL _{412}	(Austria) Marcel Hirscher	(Italy) Giuliano Razzoli	(Germany) Felix Neureuther	
1455	12	(Note: Slalom from Levi was rescheduled to Flachau on 21 December 2011)21 December 2011	(Austria) Flachau	SL _{413}	(Croatia) Ivica Kostelić	(Sweden) André Myhrer	(Italy) Cristian Deville	
1456	13	29 December 2011	(Italy) Bormio	DH _{416}	(Switzerland) Didier Défago	(Switzerland) Patrick Küng	(Austria) Klaus Kröll	
		1 January 2012	(Germany) Munich	CE _{cnx}	lack of snow			
1457	14	5 January 2012	(Croatia) Zagreb	SL _{414}	(Austria) Marcel Hirscher	(Germany) Felix Neureuther	(Croatia) Ivica Kostelić	
1458	15	7 January 2012	(Switzerland) Adelboden	GS _{351}	(Austria) Marcel Hirscher	(Austria) Benjamin Raich	(Italy) Massimiliano Blardone	
1459	16	8 January 2012	(Switzerland) Adelboden	SL _{415}	(Austria) Marcel Hirscher	(Croatia) Ivica Kostelić	(Italy) Stefano Gross	
1460	17	13 January 2012	(Switzerland) Wengen	SC _{113}	(Croatia) Ivica Kostelić	(Switzerland) Beat Feuz	(United States) Bode Miller	
1461	18	14 January 2012	(Switzerland) Wengen	DH _{417}	(Switzerland) Beat Feuz	(Austria) Hannes Reichelt	(Italy) Christof Innerhofer	
1462	19	15 January 2012	(Switzerland) Wengen	SL _{416}	(Croatia) Ivica Kostelić	(Sweden) André Myhrer	(Germany) Fritz Dopfer	
		20 January 2012	(Austria) Kitzbühel	SG _{cnx}	rain; replaced in Crans-Montana on 24 February 2012			
1463	20	21 January 2012	(Austria) Kitzbühel	DH _{418}	(Switzerland) Didier Cuche	(Austria) Romed Baumann	(Austria) Klaus Kröll	
1464	21	22 January 2012	(Austria) Kitzbühel	SL _{417}	(Italy) Cristian Deville	(Austria) Mario Matt	(Croatia) Ivica Kostelić	
1465	22	22 January 2012	(Austria) Kitzbühel	KB _{114}	(Croatia) Ivica Kostelić	(Switzerland) Beat Feuz	(Switzerland) Silvan Zurbriggen	
1466	23	24 January 2012	(Austria) Schladming	SL _{418}	(Austria) Marcel Hirscher	(Italy) Stefano Gross	(Austria) Mario Matt	
1467	24	28 January 2012	(Germany) Garmisch-Partenkirchen	DH _{419}	(Switzerland) Didier Cuche	(Canada) Erik Guay	(Austria) Hannes Reichelt	
		29 January 2012	(Germany) Garmisch-Partenkirchen	SG _{cnx}	fog; replaced in Kvitfjell on 2 March 2012			
1468	25	(Note: Downhill from Val Gardena was rescheduled to Chamonix on 3 February 2012)3 February 2012	(France) Chamonix	DH _{420}	(Austria) Klaus Kröll	(United States) Bode Miller	(Switzerland) Didier Cuche	[http
1469	26	4 February 2012	(France) Chamonix	DH _{421}	(Canada) Jan Hudec	(Austria) Romed Baumann	(Canada) Erik Guay	
1470	27	5 February 2012	(France) Chamonix	SC _{115}	(Austria) Romed Baumann	(France) Alexis Pinturault	(Switzerland) Beat Feuz	
1471	28	11 February 2012	(Russia) Sochi	DH _{422}	(Switzerland) Beat Feuz	(Canada) Benjamin Thomsen	(France) Adrien Théaux	
1472	29	12 February 2012	(Russia) Sochi	SC _{116}	(Croatia) Ivica Kostelić	(Switzerland) Beat Feuz	(France) Thomas Mermillod-Blondin	
1473	30	18 February 2012	(Bulgaria) Bansko	GS _{352}	(Austria) Marcel Hirscher	(Italy) Massimiliano Blardone	(Austria) Marcel Mathis	
1474	31	19 February 2012	(Bulgaria) Bansko	SL _{419}	(Austria) Marcel Hirscher	(Sweden) André Myhrer	(Italy) Stefano Gross	
1475	32	21 February 2012	(Russia) Moscow	CE _{002}	(France) Alexis Pinturault	(Germany) Felix Neureuther	(Sweden) André Myhrer	
1476	33	(Note: Super giant slalom from Kitzbühel was rescheduled to Crans-Montana on 24 February 2012)24 February 2012	(Switzerland) Crans-Montana	SG _{162}	(Switzerland) Didier Cuche	(Canada) Jan Hudec	(Austria) Benjamin Raich	
1477	34	25 February 2012	(Switzerland) Crans-Montana	SG _{163}	(Austria) Benjamin Raich	(France) Adrien Théaux	(Switzerland) Didier Cuche	
1478	35	26 February 2012	(Switzerland) Crans-Montana	GS _{353}	(Italy) Massimiliano Blardone	(Austria) Marcel Hirscher	(Austria) Hannes Reichelt	
1479	36	(Note: Super giant slalom from Garmisch was rescheduled to Kvitfjell on 2 March 2012)2 March 2012	(Norway) Kvitfjell	SG _{164}	(Switzerland) Beat Feuz (Austria) Klaus Kröll		(Norway) Kjetil Jansrud	
1480	37	3 March 2012	(Norway) Kvitfjell	DH _{423}	(Austria) Klaus Kröll	(Norway) Kjetil Jansrud	(Norway) Aksel Lund Svindal	
1481	38	4 March 2012	(Norway) Kvitfjell	SG _{165}	(Norway) Kjetil Jansrud	(Norway) Aksel Lund Svindal	(Switzerland) Beat Feuz	
1482	39	10 March 2012	(Slovenia) Kranjska Gora	GS _{354}	(United States) Ted Ligety	(France) Alexis Pinturault	(Austria) Marcel Hirscher	
1483	40	11 March 2012	(Slovenia) Kranjska Gora	SL _{420}	(Sweden) André Myhrer	(Italy) Cristian Deville	(France) Alexis Pinturault	
1484	41	14 March 2012	(Austria) Schladming	DH _{424}	(Norway) Aksel Lund Svindal	(Switzerland) Beat Feuz	(Austria) Hannes Reichelt	
1485	42	15 March 2012	(Austria) Schladming	SG _{166}	(Italy) Christof Innerhofer	(France) Alexis Pinturault	(Austria) Marcel Hirscher	
1486	43	17 March 2012	(Austria) Schladming	GS _{355}	(Austria) Marcel Hirscher	(Austria) Hannes Reichelt	(Austria) Marcel Mathis	
1487	44	18 March 2012	(Austria) Schladming	SL _{421}	(Sweden) André Myhrer	(Germany) Felix Neureuther	(Austria) Mario Matt	

=== Women ===
Event key: DH – Downhill, SL – Slalom, GS – Giant slalom, SG – Super giant slalom, SC – Super combined, CE – City Event (Parallel)
Race	Season	Date	Place	Type	Winner	Second	Third	Details
1351	1	22 October 2011	(Austria) Sölden	GS _{346}	(United States) Lindsey Vonn	(Germany) Viktoria Rebensburg	(Austria) Elisabeth Görgl	
		12 November 2011	(Finland) Levi	SL _{cnx}	lack of snow; replaced in Flachau on 20 December 2011			
1352	2	26 November 2011	(United States) Aspen	GS _{347}	(Germany) Viktoria Rebensburg	(Austria) Elisabeth Görgl	(United States) Julia Mancuso	
1353	3	27 November 2011	(United States) Aspen	SL _{391}	(Austria) Marlies Schild	(Sweden) Maria Pietilä Holmner	(Germany) Maria Höfl-Riesch	
1354	4	2 December 2011	(Canada) Lake Louise	DH _{345}	(United States) Lindsey Vonn	(Liechtenstein) Tina Weirather	(Switzerland) Dominique Gisin	
1355	5	3 December 2011	(Canada) Lake Louise	DH _{346}	(United States) Lindsey Vonn	(France) Marie Marchand-Arvier	(Austria) Elisabeth Görgl	
1356	6	4 December 2011	(Canada) Lake Louise	SG _{178}	(United States) Lindsey Vonn	(Austria) Anna Fenninger	(United States) Julia Mancuso	
1357	7	(Note: Super giant slalom from Val d'Isère was rescheduled to Beaver Creek on 7 December 2011)7 December 2011	(United States) Beaver Creek	SG _{179}	(United States) Lindsey Vonn	(Switzerland) Fabienne Suter	(Austria) Anna Fenninger	
		10 December 2011	(France) Val-d'Isère	SG _{cnx}	lack of snow; replaced in Beaver Creek on 7 December 2011			
		11 December 2011	(France) Val-d'Isère	SC _{cnx}	lack of snow; replaced in St. Moritz on 29 January 2012			
		17 December 2011	(France) Courchevel	SL _{cnx}	heavy snow; replaced in Courchevel on 18 December 2011			
		18 December 2011	(France) Courchevel	GS _{cnx}	heavy snow; replaced in Soldeu on 10 February 2012			
1358	8	(Note: Slalom from Courchevel was rescheduled from 17 to 18 December 2011)18 December 2011	(France) Courchevel	SL _{392}	(Austria) Marlies Schild	(Finland) Tanja Poutiainen	(Austria) Kathrin Zettel	
1359	9	(Note: Slalom from Levi was rescheduled to Flachau on 20 December 2011)20 December 2011	(Austria) Flachau	SL _{393}	(Austria) Marlies Schild	(Germany) Maria Höfl-Riesch	(Slovenia) Tina Maze	
1360	10	28 December 2011	(Austria) Lienz	GS _{348}	(Austria) Anna Fenninger	(Italy) Federica Brignone	(France) Tessa Worley	
1361	11	29 December 2011	(Austria) Lienz	SL _{394}	(Austria) Marlies Schild	(Slovenia) Tina Maze	(United States) Mikaela Shiffrin	
		1 January 2012	(Germany) Munich	CE _{cnx}	lack of snow			
1362	12	3 January 2012	(Croatia) Zagreb	SL _{395}	(Austria) Marlies Schild	(Slovenia) Tina Maze	(Austria) Michaela Kirchgasser	
1363	13	7 January 2012	(Austria) Bad Kleinkirchheim	DH _{347}	(Austria) Elisabeth Görgl	(United States) Julia Mancuso	(Switzerland) Fabienne Suter	
1364	14	8 January 2012	(Austria) Bad Kleinkirchheim	SG _{180}	(Switzerland) Fabienne Suter	(Slovenia) Tina Maze	(Austria) Anna Fenninger	
1365	15	14 January 2012	(Italy) Cortina d'Ampezzo	DH _{348}	(Italy) Daniela Merighetti	(United States) Lindsey Vonn	(Germany) Maria Höfl-Riesch	
1366	16	15 January 2012	(Italy) Cortina d'Ampezzo	SG _{181}	(United States) Lindsey Vonn	(Germany) Maria Höfl-Riesch	(Slovenia) Tina Maze	
		21 January 2012	(Slovenia) Maribor	GS _{cnx}	lack of snow; replaced in Kranjska Gora on 21 January 2012			
		22 January 2012	(Slovenia) Maribor	SL _{cnx}	lack of snow; replaced in Kranjska Gora on 22 January 2012			
1367	17	(Note: Giant slalom from Maribor was rescheduled to Kranjska Gora on 21 January 2012)21 January 2012	(Slovenia) Kranjska Gora	GS _{349}	(France) Tessa Worley	(Italy) Federica Brignone	(Germany) Viktoria Rebensburg	
1368	18	(Note: Slalom from Maribor was rescheduled to Kranjska Gora on 22 January 2012)22 January 2012	(Slovenia) Kranjska Gora	SL _{396}	(Austria) Michaela Kirchgasser	(Finland) Tanja Poutiainen	(Slovakia) Veronika Zuzulová	
1369	19	27 January 2012	(Switzerland) St. Moritz	SC _{090}	(United States) Lindsey Vonn	(Slovenia) Tina Maze	(Austria) Nicole Hosp	
1370	20	28 January 2012	(Switzerland) St. Moritz	DH _{349}	(United States) Lindsey Vonn	(Germany) Maria Höfl-Riesch	(Liechtenstein) Tina Weirather	
1371	21	(Note: Super combined from Val d'Isère was rescheduled to St. Moritz on 29 January 2012)29 January 2012	(Switzerland) St. Moritz	SC _{091}	(Germany) Maria Höfl-Riesch	(United States) Lindsey Vonn	(Austria) Nicole Hosp	
1372	22	4 February 2012	(Germany) Garmisch-Partenkirchen	DH _{350}	(United States) Lindsey Vonn	(Switzerland) Nadja Kamer	(Liechtenstein) Tina Weirather	
1373	23	5 February 2012	(Germany) Garmisch-Partenkirchen	SG _{182}	(United States) Julia Mancuso	(Austria) Anna Fenninger	(Liechtenstein) Tina Weirather	
		(Note: Slalom from Courchevel was rescheduled to Soldeu on 10 February 2012 and canceled. It was finally rescheduled to Ofterschwang on 2 March 2012)10 February 2012	(Andorra) Soldeu	GS _{cnx}	strong winds; replaced in Ofterschwang on 2 March 2012			
1374	24	11 February 2012	(Andorra) Soldeu	SL _{397}	(Austria) Marlies Schild	(Sweden) Frida Hansdotter	(Austria) Kathrin Zettel	
1375	25	12 February 2012	(Andorra) Soldeu	GS _{350}	(France) Tessa Worley	(Slovenia) Tina Maze	(Germany) Maria Höfl-Riesch	
1376	26	18 February 2012	(Russia) Sochi	DH _{351}	(Germany) Maria Höfl-Riesch	(Austria) Elisabeth Görgl	(United States) Lindsey Vonn	
		19 February 2012	(Russia) Sochi	SC _{cnx}	heavy snow			
1377	27	21 February 2012	(Russia) Moscow	CE _{002}	(United States) Julia Mancuso	(Austria) Michaela Kirchgasser	(United States) Lindsey Vonn	
		25 February 2012	(Bulgaria) Bansko	DH _{cnx}	strong winds			
1378	28	26 February 2012	(Bulgaria) Bansko	SG _{183}	(United States) Lindsey Vonn	(Liechtenstein) Tina Weirather	(Italy) Daniela Merighetti	
1379	29	(Note: Slalom from Courchevel and moved to Soldeu was finally rescheduled to Ofterschwang on 2 March 2012 and 10 February 2012 in Soldeu.)2 March 2012	(Germany) Ofterschwang	GS _{351}	(Germany) Viktoria Rebensburg	(Slovenia) Tina Maze	(Italy) Irene Curtoni (Austria) Elisabeth Görgl	
1380	30	3 March 2012	(Germany) Ofterschwang	GS _{352}	(Germany) Viktoria Rebensburg	(United States) Lindsey Vonn	(Slovenia) Tina Maze	
1381	31	4 March 2012	(Germany) Ofterschwang	SL _{398}	(Canada) Erin Mielzynski	(United States) Resi Stiegler	(Austria) Marlies Schild	
1382	32	9 March 2012	(Sweden) Åre	GS _{353}	(United States) Lindsey Vonn	(Italy) Federica Brignone	(Germany) Viktoria Rebensburg	
1383	33	10 March 2012	(Sweden) Åre	SL _{399}	(Germany) Maria Höfl-Riesch	(Slovakia) Veronika Zuzulová	(Canada) Marie-Michèle Gagnon	
1384	34	14 March 2012	(Austria) Schladming	DH _{352}	(United States) Lindsey Vonn	(France) Marion Rolland	(Slovenia) Tina Maze	
1385	35	15 March 2012	(Austria) Schladming	SG _{184}	(Germany) Viktoria Rebensburg	(United States) Julia Mancuso	(France) Marion Rolland	
1386	36	17 March 2012	(Austria) Schladming	SL _{400}	(Austria) Michaela Kirchgasser	(Slovakia) Veronika Zuzulová	(Austria) Marlies Schild	
1387	37	18 March 2012	(Austria) Schladming	GS _{354}	(Germany) Viktoria Rebensburg	(Austria) Anna Fenninger	(Italy) Federica Brignone	

=== Nation team event ===
Event key: PG – Parallel giant slalom
Race	Season	Date	Place	Type	Winner	Second	Third	Details
6	1	16 March 2012	(Austria) Schladming	PG _{003}	Austria Eva-Maria Brem; Michaela Kirchgasser; Stephanie Köhle; Max Franz; Marcel Mathis; Philipp Schörghofer	Switzerland Lara Gut; Wendy Holdener; Markus Vogel; Ralph Weber; Silvan Zurbriggen	Sweden Therese Borssén; Frida Hansdotter; Anna Swenn-Larsson; Axel Bäck; Mattias Hargin; André Myhrer	

== Men's standings ==
=== Overall ===
Rank	after all 44 races	Points
1	(Austria) Marcel Hirscher	1355
2	(Switzerland) Beat Feuz	1330
3	(Norway) Aksel Lund Svindal	1131
4	(Croatia) Ivica Kostelić	1064
5	(Austria) Hannes Reichelt	1024

=== Downhill ===
Rank	after all 11 races	Points
1	(Austria) Klaus Kröll	605
2	(Switzerland) Beat Feuz	598
3	(Switzerland) Didier Cuche	521
4	(Austria) Hannes Reichelt	396
5	(United States) Bode Miller	383

=== Super-G ===
Rank	after all 8 races	Points
1	(Norway) Aksel Lund Svindal	413
2	(Switzerland) Didier Cuche	400
3	(Switzerland) Beat Feuz	368
4	(Norway) Kjetil Jansrud	342
5	(Austria) Klaus Kröll	304

=== Giant slalom ===
Rank	after all 9 races	Points
1	(Austria) Marcel Hirscher	705
2	(United States) Ted Ligety	513
3	(Italy) Massimiliano Blardone	408
4	(France) Alexis Pinturault	364
5	(Austria) Hannes Reichelt	337

=== Slalom ===
Rank	after all 11 races	Points
1	(Sweden) André Myhrer	644
2	(Croatia) Ivica Kostelić	610
3	(Austria) Marcel Hirscher	560
4	(Italy) Cristian Deville	450
5	(Italy) Stefano Gross	412

=== Super combined ===
Rank	after all 4 races	Points
1	(Croatia) Ivica Kostelić	336
2	(Switzerland) Beat Feuz	300
3	(Austria) Romed Baumann	159
4	(France) Alexis Pinturault	130
5	(Norway) Aksel Lund Svindal	128

== Women's standings ==
=== Overall ===
Rank	after all 37 races	Points
1	(United States) Lindsey Vonn	1980
2	(Slovenia) Tina Maze	1402
3	(Germany) Maria Höfl-Riesch	1227
4	(United States) Julia Mancuso	1020
5	(Austria) Anna Fenninger	994

=== Downhill ===
Rank	after all 8 races	Points
1	(United States) Lindsey Vonn	690
2	(Liechtenstein) Tina Weirather	400
3	(Austria) Elisabeth Görgl	384
4	(Germany) Maria Höfl-Riesch	379
5	(United States) Julia Mancuso	277

=== Super-G ===
Rank	after all 7 races	Points
1	(United States) Lindsey Vonn	453
2	(United States) Julia Mancuso	381
3	(Austria) Anna Fenninger	369
4	(Slovenia) Tina Maze	257
5	(Switzerland) Fabienne Suter	226

=== Giant slalom ===
Rank	after all 9 races	Points
1	(Germany) Viktoria Rebensburg	650
2	(United States) Lindsey Vonn	455
3	(France) Tessa Worley	446
4	(Austria) Anna Fenninger	442
5	(Slovenia) Tina Maze	367

=== Slalom ===
Rank	after all 10 races	Points
1	(Austria) Marlies Schild	760
2	(Austria) Michaela Kirchgasser	452
3	(Slovenia) Tina Maze	413
4	(Slovakia) Veronika Zuzulová	377
5	(Austria) Kathrin Zettel	356

=== Super combined ===
Rank	after all 2 races	Points
1	(United States) Lindsey Vonn	180
2	(Slovenia) Tina Maze	125
3	(Austria) Nicole Hosp	120
4	(Germany) Maria Höfl-Riesch	110
5	(Austria) Kathrin Zettel	79

== Nations Cup ==
=== Overall ===
Rank	after all 81 races	Points
1	Austria	13676
2	Italy	6907
3	Switzerland	6503
4	United States	6276
5	France	6131

=== Men ===
Rank	after all 44 races	Points
1	Austria	7767
2	Switzerland	4472
3	Italy	3861
4	France	3736
5	Norway	2247

=== Women ===
Rank	after all 37 races	Points
1	Austria	5909
2	United States	4057
3	Italy	3046
4	Germany	2970
5	France	2395
