= FIS Alpine World Ski Championships 2011 – Men's giant slalom =

Complete results for Men's giant slalom competition at the 2011 World Championships. It ran on February 18 at 10:00 local time (1st run) and 13:30 local time (2nd run), the ninth race of the championships. 123 athletes from 51 countries competed in the qualification race on February 17.

== Results ==
=== Race ===
Rank	Bib	Name	Nation	Run 1	Rank	Run 2	Rank	Total	Difference
1st place, gold medalist(s)	1	Ted Ligety	United States	1:02.33	4	1:08.23	7	2:10.56	
2nd place, silver medalist(s)	3	Cyprien Richard	France	1:02.79	7	1:07.85	2	2:10.64	+0.08
3rd place, bronze medalist(s)	5	Philipp Schörghofer	Austria	1:02.13	2	1:08.86	19	2:10.99	+0.43
4	2	Aksel Lund Svindal	Norway	1:02.08	1	1:08.97	21	2:11.05	+0.49
5	6	Kjetil Jansrud	Norway	1:03.01	9	1:08.28	8	2:11.29	+0.73
6	14	Thomas Fanara	France	1:03.32	10	1:08.00	3	2:11.32	+0.76
7	4	Carlo Janka	Switzerland	1:02.57	6	1:08.91	20	2:11.48	+0.92
8	11	Didier Cuche	Switzerland	1:02.46	5	1:09.03	23	2:11.49	+0.93
9	8	Gauthier de Tessieres	France	1:02.86	8	1:08.64	13	2:11.50	+0.94
10	25	Marcus Sandell	Finland	1:03.56	16	1:08.10	6	2:11.66	+1.10
11	13	Romed Baumann	Austria	1:03.72	18	1:08.05	5	2:11.77	+1.21
12	16	Bode Miller	United States	1:04.01	27	1:07.82	1	2:11.83	+1.27
13	9	Ivica Kostelic	Croatia	1:02.31	3	1:09.59	32	2:11.90	+1.34
13	32	Justin Murisier	Switzerland	1:03.90	24	1:08.00	3	2:11.90	+1.34
15	27	Fritz Dopfer	Germany	1:03.47	13	1:08.50	11	2:11.97	+1.41
16	22	Leif Kristian Haugen	Norway	1:03.55	14	1:08.51	12	2:12.06	+1.50
17	10	Manfred Mölgg	Italy	1:03.37	11	1:08.80	17	2:12.17	+1.61
18	20	Matts Olsson	Sweden	1:03.85	21	1:08.34	9	2:12.19	+1.63
19	17	Ondrej Bank	Czech Republic	1:03.41	12	1:08.98	22	2:12.39	+1.83
20	12	Davide Simoncelli	Italy	1:03.72	18	1:08.79	16	2:12.51	+1.95
21	15	Marc Berthod	Switzerland	1:04.20	29	1:08.38	10	2:12.58	+2.02
22	30	Björn Sieber	Austria	1:03.89	23	1:08.73	14	2:12.62	+2.06
23	23	Stephan Görgl	Austria	1:03.91	25	1:08.74	15	2:12.65	+2.09
24	18	Sandro Viletta	Switzerland	1:03.55	14	1:09.20	28	2:12.75	+2.19
25	19	Truls Ove Karlsen	Norway	1:03.87	22	1:09.05	24	2:12.92	+2.36
26	38	Matic Skube	Slovenia	1:03.98	26	1:09.10	26	2:13.08	+2.52
27	36	Andreas Romar	Finland	1:04.10	28	1:09.07	25	2:13.17	+2.61
28	28	Giovanni Borsotti	Italy	1:04.49	35	1:08.83	18	2:13.32	+2.76
29	37	Stefan Luitz	Germany	1:03.68	17	1:09.68	33	2:13.36	+2.80
30	7	Massimiliano Blardone	Italy	1:04.43	33	1:09.19	27	2:13.62	+3.06
31	34	Krystof Kryzl	Czech Republic	1:04.40	32	1:09.32	29	2:13.72	+3.16
32	35	Samu Torsti	Finland	1:04.29	30	1:09.48	30	2:13.77	+3.21
33	24	Thomas Frey	France	1:03.75	20	1:10.10	35	2:13.85	+3.29
34	21	Felix Neureuther	Germany	1:04.45	34	1:09.48	30	2:13.93	+3.37
35	31	Warner Nickerson	United States	1:04.85	39	1:09.91	34	2:14.76	+4.20
36	43	Adam Zika	Czech Republic	1:04.65	38	1:10.25	36	2:14.90	+4.34
37	45	Paul de la Cuesta	Spain	1:04.60	37	1:10.31	38	2:14.91	+4.35
38	49	Natko Zrncic-Dim	Croatia	1:05.19	42	1:10.29	37	2:15.48	+4.92
39	52	David Ryding	Great Britain	1:04.93	40	1:10.86	39	2:15.79	+5.23
40	46	Roger Vidosa	Andorra	1:04.95	41	1:11.08	40	2:16.03	+5.47
41	50	Jaroslav Babusiak	Slovakia	1:05.41	44	1:11.44	43	2:16.85	+6.29
42	42	Cristian Javier Simari Birkner	Argentina	1:05.97	48	1:11.17	41	2:17.14	+6.58
43	60	Tim Cafe	New Zealand	1:06.09	49	1:11.99	44	2:18.08	+7.52
44	53	Olivier Jenot	Monaco	1:06.81	54	1:11.41	42	2:18.22	+7.66
45	59	Georgi Georgiev	Bulgaria	1:06.24	50	1:12.22	45	2:18.46	+7.90
46	66	Iason Abramashvili	Georgia	1:05.97	47	1:12.58	47	2:18.55	+7.99
47	58	Sebastian Brigovic	Croatia	1:06.50	52	1:12.22	45	2:18.72	+8.16
48	71	Simon Heeb	Liechtenstein	1:06.92	55	1:13.03	49	2:19.95	+9.39
49	65	Jeroen van den Bogaert	Belgium	1:06.67	53	1:13.94	51	2:20.61	+10.05
50	64	Alex Beniaidze	Georgia	1:08.27	60	1:12.65	48	2:20.92	+10.46
51	77	Yuri Danilochkin	Belarus	1:07.77	58	1:13.62	50	2:21.39	+10.83
52	73	Dmitriy Koshkin	Kazakhstan	1:08.14	59	1:14.29	52	2:22.43	+11.87
53	56	Aleksandr Khoroshilov	Russia	1:05.34	43	1:28.40	53	2:33.74	+23.18
	26	Kalle Palander	Finland	1:05.81	46	DNS			
	44	Martin Vrablik	Czech Republic	1:07.46	57	DNS			
	54	Noel Baxter	Great Britain	1:06.30	51	DNS			
	61	Maciej Bydlinski	Poland	1:06.93	56	DNS			
	29	Tommy Ford	United States	1:04.30	31	DNF			
	33	Mirko Deflorian	Moldova	1:04.50	36	DNF			
	51	TJ Baldwin	Great Britain	1:05.47	45	DNF			
	74	Kristaps Zvejnieks	Latvia	1:08.28	61	DNQ			
	48	Ryunosuke Ohkoshi	Japan	1:08.65	62	DNQ			
	82	Marko Rudić	Bosnia and Herzegovina	1:08.72	63	DNQ			
	81	Christian Vial	Denmark	1:08.89	64	DNQ			
	76	Antonio Ristevski	Macedonia	1:09.29	65	DNQ			
	63	Maarten Meiners	Netherlands	1:11.31	66	DNQ			
	90	Manfred Oettl Reyes	Peru	1:11.35	67	DNQ			
	79	Alexandros Tsaknakis	Greece	1:11.47	68	DNQ			
	89	Virgile Vandeput	Israel	1:11.52	69	DNQ			
	87	Norbert Farkas	Hungary	1:13.09	70	DNQ			
	91	Peter Scott	South Africa	1:14.07	71	DNQ			
	85	Erdinc Turksever	Turkey	1:14.21	72	DNQ			
	80	Zhang Yuxin	China	1:16.26	73	DNQ			
	98	Patrick Girst	Luxembourg	1:16.80	74	DNQ			
	94	Conor Lyne	Ireland	1:16.87	75	DNQ			
	96	Tarek Fenianos	Lebanon	1:21.25	76	DNQ			
	39	Stepan Zuev	Russia	DNF					
	40	Benjamin Griffin	New Zealand	DNF					
	41	Ferran Terra	Spain	DNF					
	55	Sebastiano Gastaldi	Argentina	DNF					
	57	Tin Siroki	Croatia	DNF					
	62	Nikola Chongarov	Bulgaria	DNF					
	67	Pouria Saveh-Shemshaki	Iran	DNF					
	68	Hugh Stevens	Australia	DNF					
	69	Mike Rishworth	Australia	DNF					
	70	Ioan-Gabriel Nan	Romania	DNF					
	72	Nicola Kindle	Liechtenstein	DNF					
	75	Jhonatan Longhi	Brazil	DNF					
	78	Eugenio Claro	Chile	DNF					
	83	Gunnar-Thor Halldorsson	Iceland	DNF					
	84	Vitalij Rumanciev	Lithuania	DNF					
	86	Igor Vakhnenko	Ukraine	DNF					
	88	Bojan Kosic	Montenegro	DNF					
	92	Artem Voronov	Uzbekistan	DNF					
	93	Dmitry Trelevski	Kyrgyzstan	DNF					
	97	Constantinos Papamichael	Cyprus	DNF					
	47	Adam Žampa	Slovakia	DSQ					
	95	Arsen Nersisyan	Armenia	DSQ					

=== Qualification ===
Rank	Bib	Name	Nation	Run 1	Rank	Run 2	Rank	Total	Difference
1	8	Nikola Chongarov	Bulgaria	1:06.70	7	1:07.10	1	2:13.70	
2	3	Tin Široki	Croatia	1:06.54	4	1:07.71	2	2:14.25	+0.55
3	7	Olivier Jenot	Monaco	1:06.26	1	1:08.27	9	2:14.53	+0.83
4	2	David Ryding	Great Britain	1:06.54	4	1:08.16	5	2:14.70	+1.00
4	6	Noel Baxter	Great Britain	1:06.53	3	1:08.17	6	2:14.70	+1.00
6	1	TJ Baldwin	Great Britain	1:06.30	2	1:08.43	16	2:14.73	+1.03
7	16	Maarten Meiners	Netherlands	1:06.56	6	1:08.23	8	2:14.79	+1.09
8	14	Sebastian Brigović	Croatia	1:07.37	14	1:07.92	3	2:15.29	+1.59
9	10	Maciej Bydlinski	Poland	1:07.32	11	1:08.02	4	2:15.34	+1.64
10	4	Sebastiano Gastaldi	Argentina	1:07.10	9	1:08.38	14	2:15.48	+1.78
11	5	Aleksandr Khoroshilov	Russia	1:07.39	15	1:08.17	6	2:15.56	+1.86
12	11	Georgi Georgiev	Bulgaria	1:07.09	8	1:08.50	17	2:15.59	+1.89
13	9	Joery van Rooij	Netherlands	1:07.36	13	1:08.36	13	2:15.72	+2.02
14	22	Hugh Stevens	Australia	1:07.32	12	1:08.50	17	2:15.82	+2.12
15	19	Jeroen van den Bogaert	Belgium	1:07.64	19	1:08.29	10	2:15.93	+2.23
16	17	Alex Beniaidze	Georgia	1:07.70	20	1:08.32	12	2:16.02	+2.32
17	18	Kevin Esteve Rigail	Andorra	1:07.84	22	1:08.29	10	2:16.13	+2.43
18	13	Tim Cafe	New Zealand	1:07.16	10	1:09.02	25	2:16.18	+2.48
19	20	Iason Abramashvili	Georgia	1:07.56	16	1:08.64	19	2:16.20	+2.50
20	46	Eugenio Claro	Chile	1:07.61	17	1:08.99	24	2:16.60	+2.90
21	45	Yuri Danilochkin	Belarus	1:08.22	26	1:08.42	15	2:16.64	+2.94
22	24	Mike Rishworth	Australia	1:07.79	21	1:08.95	23	2:16.74	+3.04
23	25	Ioan-Gabriel Nan	Romania	1:08.02	24	1:08.73	20	2:16.75	+3.05
24	32	Nicola Kindle	Liechtenstein	1:07.61	17	1:09.47	29	2:17.08	+3.38
25	31	Simon Heeb	Liechtenstein	1:08.50	29	1:08.76	21	2:17.26	+3.56
26	37	Marco Pfiffner	Liechtenstein	1:08.38	28	1:09.03	26	2:17.41	+3.71
27	26	Martin Anguita	Chile	1:08.55	30	1:08.91	22	2:17.46	+3.76
28	36	Kristaps Zvejnieks	Latvia	1:07.91	23	1:09.55	32	2:17.46	+3.76
29	42	Nicolas Carvallo	Chile	1:08.65	31	1:09.43	28	2:18.08	+4.38
30	43	Mohammad Kiadarbandsari	Iran	1:08.71	32	1:09.48	30	2:18.19	+4.49
31	41	Dardan Dehari	Macedonia	1:08.35	27	1:10.21	40	2:18.56	+4.86
32	23	Alexandru Barbu	Romania	1:09.52	38	1:09.11	27	2:18.63	+4.93
33	30	Matej Kutlik	Slovakia	1:09.03	33	1:09.98	37	2:19.01	+5.31
34	61	Taras Pimenov	Kazakhstan	1:09.04	34	1:10.11	38	2:19.15	+5.45
35	69	Kote Vakhtangishvili	Georgia	1:09.72	42	1:09.77	33	2:19.49	+5.79
36	35	Bart Mollin	Belgium	1:09.15	35	1:10.36	41	2:19.51	+5.81
37	21	Pouria Saveh-Shemshaki	Iran	1:09.68	41	1:09.97	36	2:19.65	+5.95
38	29	Andreas Zampa	Slovakia	1:09.72	42	1:09.93	34	2:19.65	+5.95
39	63	Norbert Farkas	Hungary	1:09.88	44	1:09.95	35	2:19.83	+6.13
40	54	Patrick Brachner	Azerbaijan	1:10.89	56	1:09.50	31	2:20.39	+6.69
41	123	Georg Lindner	Moldova	1:10.21	46	1:10.19	39	2:20.40	+6.70
42	55	Vitalij Rumanciev	Lithuania	1:09.91	45	1:11.01	44	2:20.92	+7.22
43	74	Dimitri Gedevanishvili	Georgia	1:10.43	49	1:10.55	42	2:20.98	+7.28
44	85	Kaspars Daugulis	Latvia	1:10.82	55	1:10.61	43	2:21.43	+7.73
45	60	Igor Vakhnenko	Ukraine	1:10.52	50	1:11.31	45	2:21.83	+8.13
46	49	Christian Vial	Denmark	1:10.22	47	1:11.74	50	2:21.96	+8.26
47	71	Vasyl Telychuk	Ukraine	1:10.66	51	1:11.40	47	2:22.06	+8.36
48	66	Marc Poccard	Australia	1:10.24	48	1:12.05	51	2:22.29	+8.59
49	62	Hossein Saveh-Shemshaki	Iran	1:11.18	58	1:11.39	46	2:22.57	+8.87
50	73	Rostyslav Feshchuk	Ukraine	1:11.14	57	1:11.52	48	2:22.66	+8.96
51	28	Jose Tomas Echeverria	Chile	1:10.71	53	1:12.14	53	2:22.85	+9.15
52	58	Jon-Gauti Astvaldsson	Iceland	1:11.28	59	1:11.73	49	2:23.01	+9.31
53	89	Emre Simsek	Turkey	1:10.75	54	1:12.52	55	2:23.27	+9.57
54	39	Jhonatan Longhi	Brazil	1:11.48	62	1:12.47	54	2:23.95	+10.25
55	68	Csaba Bujtas	Hungary	1:11.31	61	1:12.82	57	2:24.13	+10.43
56	65	Bojan Kosić	Montenegro	1:11.66	64	1:12.58	56	2:24.24	+10.54
57	67	Brynjar-Jokull Gudmundsson	Iceland	1:11.30	60	1:13.19	62	2:24.49	+10.79
58	87	Roberts Brishka	Latvia	1:12.79	72	1:12.08	52	2:24.87	+11.17
59	57	Erdinc Turksever	Turkey	1:12.19	66	1:12.88	58	2:25.07	+11.37
60	76	Sergiy Dolgyy	Ukraine	1:12.11	65	1:13.12	59	2:25.23	+11.53
61	106	Nils-Henrik Stene	Denmark	1:12.47	68	1:13.22	63	2:25.69	+11.99
62	56	Li Lei	China	1:12.61	69	1:13.12	59	2:25.73	+12.03
63	51	Marko Rudić	Bosnia and Herzegovina	1:09.20	36	1:16.74	79	2:25.94	+12.24
64	98	Constantinos Papamichael	Cyprus	1:12.28	67	1:13.78	68	2:26.06	+12.36
65	52	Omid Tir	Iran	1:12.67	71	1:13.47	65	2:26.14	+12.44
66	70	Marton Bene	Hungary	1:12.61	70	1:14.12	70	2:26.73	+13.03
67	64	Callum Brown	Australia	1:13.89	77	1:13.15	61	2:27.04	+13.34
68	103	Nicolai Madsen	Denmark	1:13.36	74	1:14.34	71	2:27.70	+14.00
69	92	Evgeny Dus	Belarus	1:13.71	76	1:14.00	69	2:27.71	+14.01
70	83	Artem Voronov	Uzbekistan	1:13.40	75	1:14.61	73	2:28.01	+14.31
71	80	Manfred Oettl Reyes	Peru	1:14.56	80	1:13.67	67	2:28.23	+14.53
72	93	Arsen Nersisyan	Armenia	1:14.77	82	1:13.49	66	2:28.26	+14.56
73	86	Fabio Guglielmini	Brazil	1:14.74	81	1:14.37	72	2:29.07	+15.37
74	77	Paulo E. Setubal	Brazil	1:14.29	79	1:15.88	77	2:30.17	+16.47
74	81	Siarhei Mazaleuski	Belarus	1:12.86	73	1:17.31	82	2:30.17	+16.47
76	97	Chrysostomos Karamanidis	Greece	1:16.45	87	1:14.92	74	2:31.37	+17.67
77	101	Arsen Ghazaryan	Armenia	1:15.54	85	1:15.87	76	2:31.41	+17.71
78	88	Mladen Minic	Montenegro	1:15.45	84	1:16.17	78	2:31.62	+17.92
79	104	Shane McShera	Ireland	1:15.22	83	1:18.02	84	2:33.24	+19.54
80	111	Evgeniy Timofeev	Kyrgyzstan	1:16.98	89	1:17.05	81	2:34.03	+20.33
81	91	Conor Lyne	Ireland	1:17.40	92	1:16.89	80	2:34.29	+20.59
82	94	Dmitriy Babikov	Uzbekistan	1:17.33	91	1:17.46	83	2:34.79	+21.09
83	96	Tian Yuheng	China	1:16.43	86	1:18.79	87	2:35.22	+21.52
84	90	Niv Barnetz	Israel	1:17.41	93	1:18.20	85	2:35.61	+21.91
85	115	Igor Borisov	Kyrgyzstan	1:16.98	90	1:18.65	86	2:35.63	+21.93
86	102	Nicholas McKelvey	Ireland	1:16.95	88	1:19.23	89	2:36.18	+22.48
87	72	Virgile Vandeput	Israel	1:24.09	100	1:13.41	64	2:37.50	+23.80
88	108	Yura Manukyan	Armenia	1:17.76	94	1:20.10	90	2:37.86	+24.16
89	107	Patrick Girst	Luxembourg	1:19.50	95	1:19.14	88	2:38.64	+24.94
90	48	Zhang Yuxin	China	1:26.28	101	1:15.54	75	2:41.82	+28.12
91	95	Tarek Fenianos	Lebanon	1:21.76	98	1:20.44	91	2:42.20	+28.50
92	109	Ben Trierweiler	Luxembourg	1:21.60	97	1:22.44	92	2:44.04	+30.34
93	113	Sive Speelman	South Africa	1:20.19	96	1:24.55	94	2:44.74	+31.04
94	118	Tsotane Dywili	South Africa	1:23.01	99	1:22.64	93	2:45.65	+31.95
95	116	Joao-Miguel Marques	Portugal	1:31.55	106	1:26.62	95	2:58.17	+44.47
96	114	Davit Khachatryan	Armenia	1:28.57	102	1:31.49	97	3:00.06	+46.36
97	120	Kwame Nkrumah-Acheampong	Ghana	1:31.16	105	1:29.70	96	3:00.86	+47.16
98	122	Rajat Thakur	India	1:32.51	107	1:32.63	98	3:05.14	+51.44
99	117	Jorge Goncalves	Portugal	1:30.99	104	1:35.44	100	3:06.43	+52.73
100	119	Jean-Pierre Roy	Haiti	1:36.51	109	1:34.07	99	3:10.58	+56.88
	27	Rodrigo Murtagh	Argentina	1:09.66	40	DNS			
	112	Hubertus von Hohenlohe	Mexico	1:34.02	108	DNS			
	38	Josef Öhri	Liechtenstein	1:08.13	25	DNF			
	44	Ignacio Freeman Crespo	Argentina	1:09.41	37	DNF			
	47	Alexandros Tsaknakis	Greece	1:13.92	78	DNF			
	75	Daniel Petrovics	Hungary	1:10.69	52	DNF			
	78	Kristaps Blums	Latvia	1:11.51	63	DNF			
	100	Alexander Heath	South Africa	1:09.56	39	DNF			
	121	Mathias Brodersen	Denmark	1:30.63	103	DNF			
	12	Kyung Sung-hyun	South Korea	DNS					
	15	Kim Woo-sung	South Korea	DNS					
	33	Dmitriy Koshkin	Kazakhstan	DNF					
	34	Kai Alaerts	Belgium	DNF					
	50	Michal Klusak	Poland	DNF					
	53	Gunnar-Thor Halldorsson	Iceland	DNF					
	59	Sigurgeir Halldorsson	Iceland	DNF					
	79	Huang Haibin	China	DNF					
	82	Peter Scott	South Africa	DNF					
	84	Dmitry Trelevski	Kyrgyzstan	DNF					
	99	Simon Lyons	Ireland	DNF					
	110	Andrey Trelevski	Kyrgyzstan	DNF					
	40	Antonio Ristevski	Macedonia	DSQ					
	105	Safar Egemberdiev	Uzbekistan	DSQ					
