= Mattias Hargin =

Swedish alpine skier

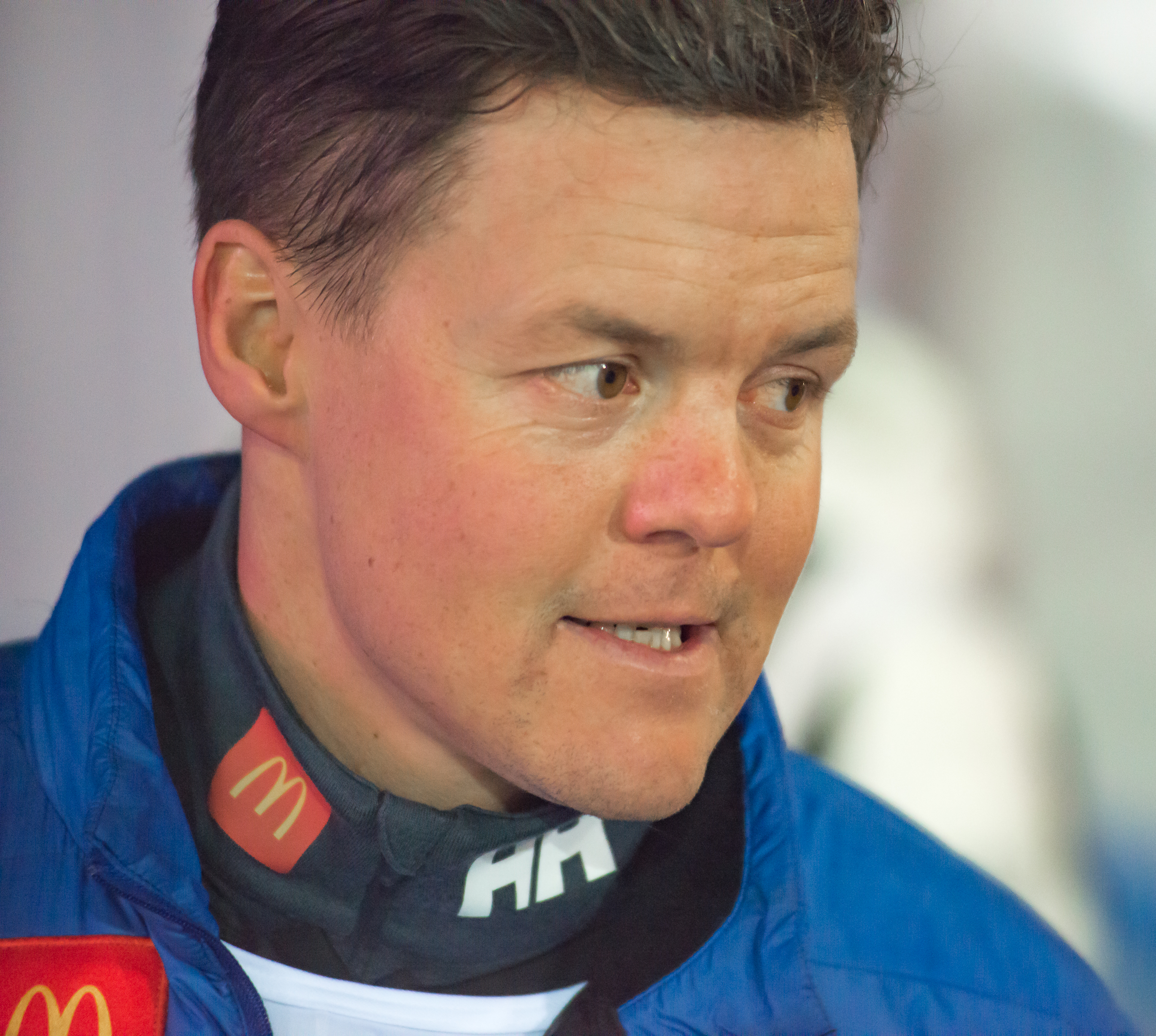
- Mattias Hargin in Hammarbybacken 2018

Personal information
- Born: 7 October 1985 (age 40) Stockholm, Sweden
- Height: 1.79 m (5 ft 10 in)
- Website: mattiashargin.com

Skiing career
- Sport: Alpine skiing
- Club: Huddinge SK
- Disciplines: Slalom
- World Cup debut: 22 December 2004 (age 19)

Olympics
- Teams: 2 – (2010, 2014)
- Medals: 0

World Championships
- Teams: 5 – (2005, 2009–2017
- Medals: 0

World Cup
- Seasons: 15 – (2005–2019)
- Wins: 1
- Podiums: 7 – (6 SL, 1 PSL)
- Overall titles: 0 – (20th in 2015)
- Discipline titles: 0 – (5th in SL, 2014)
Medal record
World Championships
Silver medal – second place	2013 Schladming	Team event
Bronze medal – third place	2015 Beaver Creek	Team event
Bronze medal – third place	2017 St. Moritz	Team event
Junior World Ski Championships
Silver medal – second place	2005 Bardonecchia	Slalom

Mattias Hargin (born 7 October 1985) is a Swedish former World Cup alpine ski racer. Born in Stockholm, he competed mainly in slalom, and is the younger brother of Janette Hargin (b. 1977), who also raced for Sweden. Hargin was married to Swedish alpine free-skier Matilda Rapaport, who died in an avalanche in Chile in July 2016.

He finished fifth in the slalom at the 2009 World Championships and competed for Sweden at the 2010 Winter Olympics in the slalom, finishing in 14th place.

In January 2011, Hargin made a strong comeback in a World Cup slalom in Zagreb to finish third. He was the last qualifier at 30th after the first run, but had the best time in the second run to attain his first World Cup podium. Hargin was runner-up in a World Cup slalom at Val-d'Isère in December 2013. His one and only World Cup win came in January 2015 at Kitzbühel.

He announced his retirement from alpine skiing on 12 March 2019.

== World Cup results ==
=== Season standings ===
Season	Age	Overall	Slalom	Giant slalom	Super-G	Downhill	Combined
2007	21	117	48	—	—	—	—
2008	22	77	28	—	—	—	—
2009	23	32	8	—	—	—	—
2010	24	32	10	—	—	—	—
2011	25	32	7	—	—	—	—
2012	26	39	10	—	—	—	—
2013	27	32	10	—	—	—	—
2014	28	22	5	—	—	—	—
2015	29	20	7	—	—	—	—
2016	30	51	14	—	—	—	—
2017	31	34	11	—	—	—	—
2018	32	35	12	—	—	—	—

- Standings through 30 January 2018

=== Race podiums ===
- 1 win – (1 SL)
- 7 podiums – (6 SL, 1 PSL)

Season	Date	Location	Discipline	Place
2011	6 January 2011	Zagreb, Croatia	Slalom	3rd
2011	25 January 2011	Schladming, Austria	Slalom	3rd
2014	15 December 2013	Val d'Isère, France	Slalom	2nd
2015	25 January 2015	Kitzbühel, Austria	Slalom	1st
2015	15 March 2015	Kranjska Gora, Slovenia	Slalom	3rd
2017	31 January 2017	Stockholm, Sweden	Parallel slalom	3rd
2018	12 November 2017	Levi, Finland	Slalom	3rd

== World Championship results ==
Year	Age	Slalom	Giant slalom	Super-G	Downhill	Combined
2005	19	DNF2	—	—	—	—
2007	21	—	—	—	—	—
2009	23	5	—	—	—	—
2011	25	12	—	—	—	—
2013	27	9	—	—	—	—
2015	29	5	—	—	—	—

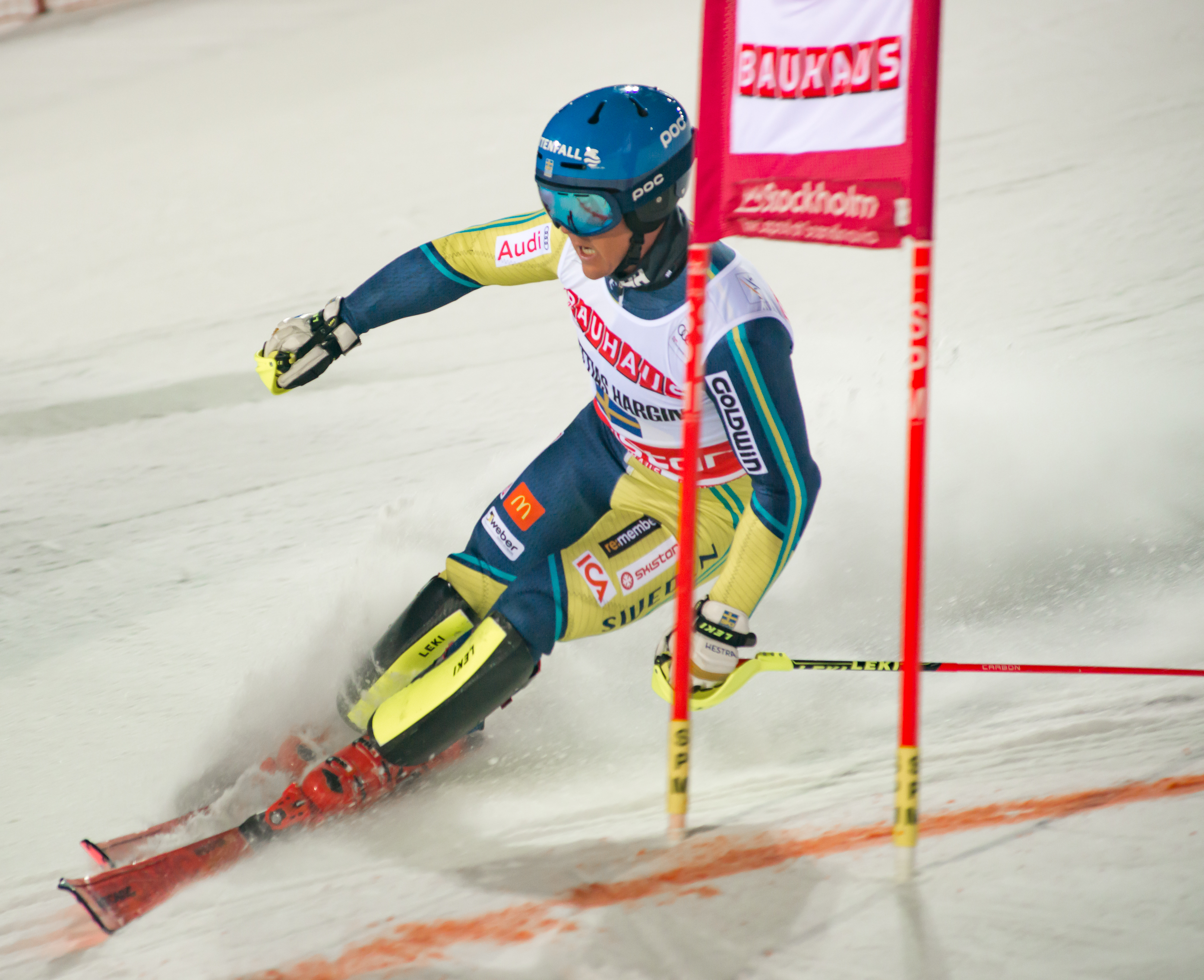
Mattias Hargin in Hammarbybacken World Cup 2018

== Olympic results ==
Year	Age	Slalom	Giant slalom	Super-G	Downhill	Combined
2010	24	14	—	—	—	—
2014	28	7	—	—	—	—
