= Klaus Kröll =

Austrian alpine skier (born 1980)

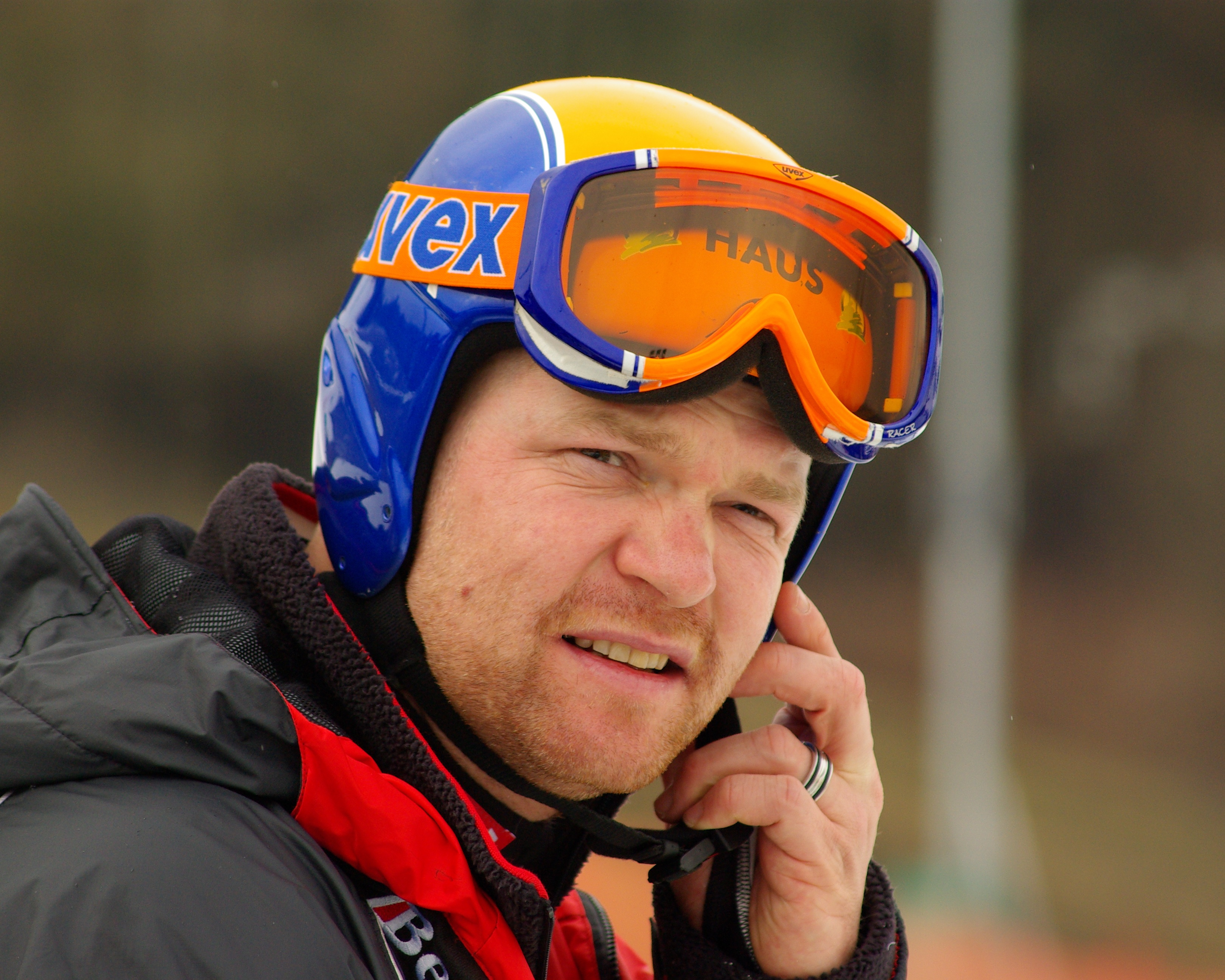
- Kröll in March 2008

Personal information
- Born: 24 April 1980 (age 46) Öblarn, Styria, Austria
- Height: 186 cm (6 ft 1 in)
- Website: klaus-kroell.at

Skiing career
- Sport: Alpine skiing
- Club: Sport Union Öblarn
- Disciplines: Downhill, Super-G
- World Cup debut: 8 January 2000 (age 19)

Olympics
- Teams: 3 – (2006, 2010, 2014)
- Medals: 0

World Championships
- Teams: 3 – (2009, 2011, 2013)
- Medals: 0

World Cup
- Seasons: 16 – (2002–17)
- Wins: 6 – (4 DH, 2 SG)
- Podiums: 24 – (21 DH, 3 SG)
- Overall titles: 0 – (7th in 2012)
- Discipline titles: 1 – (DH, 2012)
Medal record
Men's alpine skiing
Representing Austria
Junior World Ski Championships
Gold medal – first place	1999 Pra Loup	Downhill
Gold medal – first place	2000 Mont-Sainte-Anne	Super-G
Silver medal – second place	2000 Mont-Sainte-Anne	Downhill

Klaus Kröll (born 24 April 1980) is a former World Cup alpine ski racer from Austria. He specialized in the speed events of downhill and super-G and won the World Cup downhill season title in 2012. He competed in three Winter Olympics and three World Championships.

Born in Öblarn, Styria, Kröll made his World Cup debut in January 2000 at age 19. His first World Cup victory was the super-G in Kitzbühel in 2009. He ended his career having achieved six World Cup victories and 24 podia, with three wins and eight podiums at Kvitfjell, Norway.

Kröll won the World Cup downhill title in 2012 with three victories and three additional podiums. He finished seventh at the World Cup finals to hold off Beat Feuz in the final standings by just seven points, 605–598.

== World Cup results ==
=== Season titles ===
Season	Discipline
2012	Downhill

=== Season standings ===
Season	Age	Overall	Slalom	Giant slalom	Super-G	Downhill	Combined
2002	21	33	—	—	24	16	—
2003	22	27	—	—	50	10	—
2004	23	29	—	—	—	12	—
2005	24	46	—	—	—	20	—
2006	25	32	—	—	25	12	—
2007	26	48	—	—	—	21	—
2008	27	41	—	—	—	8	—
2009	28	12	—	—	8	2	—
2010	29	35	—	—	25	12	—
2011	30	10	—	—	12	3	—
2012	31	7	—	—	5	1	—
2013	32	12	—	—	14	2	—
2014	33	43	—	—	37	17	—
2015	34	64	—	—	—	22	—
2016	35	63	—	—	51	23	—
2017	36	95	—	—	—	28	—

=== Race podiums ===
- 6 wins – (4 DH, 2 SG)
- 24 podiums – (21 DH, 3 SG)

Season	Date	Location	Discipline	Place
2003	14 Dec 2002	Val-d'Isère, France	Downhill	2nd
2006	28 Jan 2006	Garmisch, Germany	Downhill	2nd
2008	29 Jan 2008	Kvitfjell, Norway	Downhill	3rd
2009	12 Dec 2008	Bormio, Italy	Downhill	2nd
2009	23 Jan 2009	Kitzbühel, Austria	Super-G	1st
2009	24 Jan 2009	Kitzbühel, Austria	Downhill	3rd
2009	7 Mar 2009	Kvitfjell, Norway	Downhill	1st
2010	6 Mar 2010	Kvitfjell, Norway	Downhill	3rd
2011	15 Jan 2011	Wengen, Switzerland	Downhill	1st
2011	29 Jan 2011	Chamonix, France	Downhill	3rd
2011	12 Mar 2011	Kvitfjell, Norway	Downhill	2nd
2011	13 Mar 2011	Kvitfjell, Norway	Super-G	2nd
2012	2 Dec 2011	(United States) Beaver Creek, USA	Downhill	3rd
2012	29 Dec 2011	Bormio, Italy	Downhill	3rd
2012	21 Jan 2012	Kitzbühel, Austria	Downhill	3rd
2012	3 Feb 2012	Chamonix, France	Downhill	1st
2012	2 Mar 2012	Kvitfjell, Norway	Super-G	1st
2012	3 Mar 2012	Kvitfjell, Norway	Downhill	1st
2013	24 Nov 2012	Lake Louise, Canada	Downhill	3rd
2013	18 Jan 2013	Wengen, Switzerland	Downhill	2nd
2013	23 Feb 2013	Garmisch, Germany	Downhill	3rd
2013	2 Mar 2013	Kvitfjell, Norway	Downhill	3rd
2014	30 Nov 2013	Lake Louise, Canada	Downhill	2nd
2016	16 Jan 2016	Wengen, Switzerland	Downhill	3rd

== World Championship results ==
Year	Age	Slalom	Giant slalom	Super-G	Downhill	Combined
2009	28	—	—	9	10	—
2011	30	—	—	—	11	—
2013	32	—	—	—	4	—

== Olympic results ==
Year	Age	Slalom	Giant slalom	Super-G	Downhill	Combined
2006	25	—	—	—	22	—
2010	29	—	—	—	9	—
2014	33	—	—	—	22	—
