= FIS Alpine World Ski Championships 2009 – Men's super-G =

Men's Super-G competition at the 2009 World Championships. The first men's race of the championships, the race was run on February 4.

== Results ==
Rank	Name	Country	Time	Diff.
1st place, gold medalist(s)	Didier Cuche	Switzerland	1:19.41	--
2nd place, silver medalist(s)	Peter Fill	Italy	1:20.40	+0.99
3rd place, bronze medalist(s)	Aksel Lund Svindal	Norway	1:20.43	+1.02
4	Christof Innerhofer	Italy	1:20.48	+1.07
5	Benjamin Raich	Austria	1:20.56	+1.15
6	John Kucera	Canada	1:21.07	+1.66
7	Marco Büchel	Liechtenstein	1:21.09	+1.68
8	Didier Défago	Switzerland	1:21.10	+1.69
9	Carlo Janka	Switzerland	1:21.19	+1.78
10	Klaus Kröll	Austria	1:21.20	+1.79
11	Gauthier de Tessières	France	1:21.73	+2.32
12	Bode Miller	United States	1:21.84	+2.43
13	Michael Walchhofer	Austria	1:21.87	+2.46
14	Werner Heel	Italy	1:21.88	+2.47
15	Stefan Thanei	Italy	1:21.89	+2.48
16	Aleš Gorza	Slovenia	1:21.99	+2.58
17	Patrick Staudacher	Italy	1:22.02	+2.61
18	Hermann Maier	Austria	1:22.30	+2.89
19	Erik Guay	Canada	1:22.39	+2.98
20	Robbie Dixon	Canada	1:22.51	+3.10
21	Adrien Theaux	France	1:22.77	+3.36
22	Pierre-Emmanuel Dalcin	France	1:22.84	+3.43
23	Natko Zrnčić-Dim	Croatia	1:23.03	+3.62
24	Stephan Keppler	Germany	1:23.11	+3.70
25	Andrej Jerman	Slovenia	1:23.52	+4.11
26	Kryštof Krýzl	Czech Republic	1:23.66	+4.25
27	Petr Záhrobský	Czech Republic	1:23.76	+4.35
28	Douglas Crawford	United Kingdom	1:23.93	+4.52
29	Edward Drake	United Kingdom	1:24.15	+4.74
30	Aleksandr Khoroshilov	Russia	1:24.16	+4.75
31	Ivan Ratkić	Croatia	1:25.14	+5.73
32	Stepan Zuev	Russia	1:25.88	+6.47
33	Hans Olsson	Sweden	1:25.89	+6.48
34	David Poisson	France	1:25.92	+6.51
35	Craig Branch	Australia	1:26.22	+6.81
36	Tim Cafe	New Zealand	1:26.77	+7.36
37	Stefan Georgiev	Bulgaria	1:26.93	+7.52
38	Stefán Jón Sigurgeirsson	Iceland	1:27.47	+8.06
39	Andrew Weibrecht	United States	1:27.48	+8.07
40	Georgi Georgiev	Bulgaria	1:28.25	+8.84
41	Maciej Bydliński	Poland	1:28.90	+9.49
42	Árni Thorvaldsson	Iceland	1:29.61	+10.20
43	Jorge Martinic	Chile	1:30.57	+11.16
44	Taras Pimenov	Kazakhstan	1:30.69	+11.28
45	Igor Zakurdaev	Kazakhstan	1:31.08	+11.67
46	Rostyslav Feshchuk	Ukraine	1:33.22	+13.81
47	Einārs Lansmanis	Latvia	1:33.80	+14.39
–	Ivica Kostelić	Croatia	DNS	–
–	Alexandru Barbu	Romania	DNS	–
–	Martin Khuber	Kazakhstan	DNS	–
–	Manuel Osborne-Paradis	Canada	DNF	–
–	Ted Ligety	United States	DNF	–
–	Marco Sullivan	United States	DNF	–
–	Ambrosi Hoffmann	Switzerland	DNF	–
–	Andreas Strodl	Germany	DNF	–
–	Kjetil Jansrud	Norway	DNF	–
–	Patrik Järbyn	Sweden	DNF	–
–	Peter Strodl	Germany	DNF	–
–	Rok Perko	Slovenia	DNF	–
–	Lars Elton Myhre	Norway	DNF	–
–	Tin Široki	Croatia	DNF	–
–	Martin Vráblík	Czech Republic	DNF	–
–	Jaroslav Babušiak	Slovakia	DNF	–
–	Angus Howden	New Zealand	DNF	–
–	Jorge Mandru	Chile	DNF	–
–	Frederik van Buynder	Belgium	DNF	–
–	Kiril Manolov	Bulgaria	DNF	–
–	Nikola Chongarov	Bulgaria	DNF	–
–	Rafael Anguita	Chile	DNF	–
–	Roberts Rode	Latvia	DNF	–
