= Werner Heel =

Italian alpine skier (born 1982)

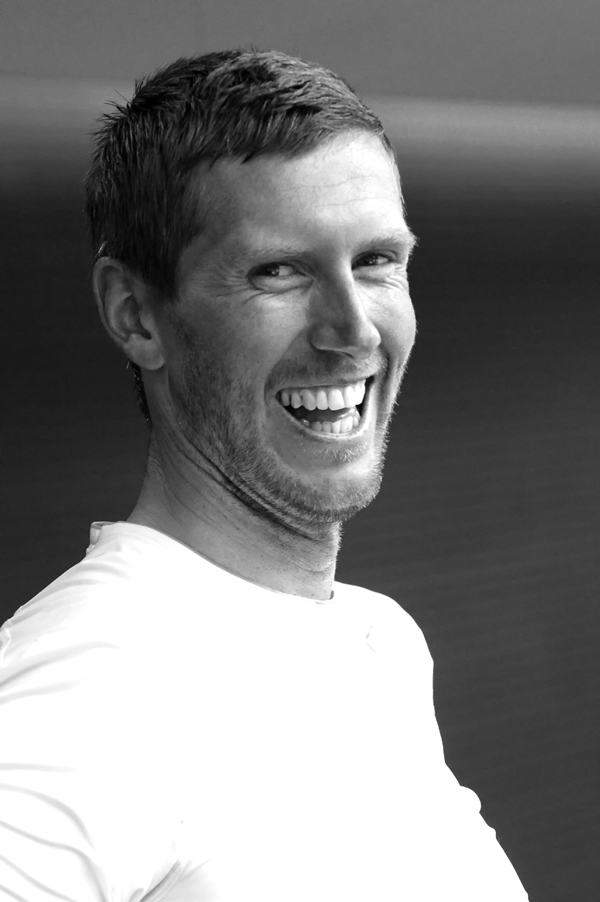
- Heel in July 2011

Personal information
- Born: 23 March 1982 (age 44) Merano, Italy
- Height: 184 cm (6 ft 0 in)
- Website: wernerheel.com

Skiing career
- Sport: Alpine skiing
- Club: G.S. Fiamme Gialle
- Disciplines: Downhill, Super-G, Combined
- World Cup debut: 28 December 2001 (age 19)

Olympics
- Teams: 2 – (2010, 2014)
- Medals: 0

World Championships
- Teams: 5 – (2007–15)
- Medals: 0

World Cup
- Seasons: 11 – (2006–16)
- Wins: 3 – (1 DH, 2 SG)
- Podiums: 10 – (5 DH, 5 SG)
- Overall titles: 0 – (16th in 2009, 2013)
- Discipline titles: 0 – (2nd in SG, 2009)

Werner Heel (born 23 March 1982) is an Italian former World Cup alpine ski racer.

== Early life and career ==
Born in Meran, Heel grew up in St. Leonhard in Passeier and currently resides in Meran, where he works as a police officer. Heel began skiing at the age of four, and his main disciplines are downhill and super-G. In order to be competitive in super combined he also practices slalom. In 2004 he won the Italian championship in super-G at Caspoggio. His career has been slowed by several injuries.

== European Cup ==
During the 2005 season, Heel achieved his best results in the European Cup with two third places in the downhill races in Roccaraso and Bad Kleinkirchheim and a fourth place in the super-G race in Tarvisio.

== World championships ==
He participated in the 2007 World Championships in Åre without finishing his run in the Super Combined, and placed 27th in the super-G.

== World Cup ==
Heel debuted in the World Cup on 28 December 2001 at the Stelvio downhill in Bormio, finishing 37th. In the 2007 season, he achieved his first top ten finish at the Kvitfjell downhill and finished 12th at Lake Louise.

The 2008 season started very well for Heel, finishing 11th in the Lake Louise downhill. He won his first race on 29 February 2008 in the Kvitfjell downhill. One day later he reconfirmed his potential finishing third in the second Kvitfjell World Cup downhill. He concluded the 2008 season with his best super-G result, a 7th place in Bormio on 13 March 2008. Near his hometown, Heel won the Super-G at Val Gardena on 19 December 2008. On 12 March 2009 he concluded his outstanding 2008/2009 season with a super-G victory in Åre, finishing second in the overall super-G world cup.

Heel races on Atomic skis.

=== Season standings ===
| Season | Age | Overall | Slalom | Giant Slalom | Super G | Downhill | Combined |
|---|---|---|---|---|---|---|---|
| 2005 | 22 | 136 | — | — | 42 | — | — |
| 2006 | 23 | 83 | — | — | 36 | 41 | 29 |
| 2007 | 24 | 74 | — | — | 32 | 33 | 36 |
| 2008 | 25 | 24 | — | — | 21 | 5 | 38 |
| 2009 | 26 | 16 | — | — | 2 | 11 | 26 |
| 2010 | 27 | 18 | — | — | 17 | 3 | 26 |
| 2011 | 28 | 34 | — | — | 14 | 22 | — |
| 2012 | 29 | 97 | — | — | 35 | 45 | — |
| 2013 | 30 | 16 | — | — | 4 | 10 | — |
| 2014 | 31 | 40 | — | — | 22 | 19 | — |
| 2015 | 32 | 38 | — | — | 33 | 15 | — |
| 2016 | 33 | 108 | — | — | — | 41 | — |
| 2017 | 34 | 120 | — | — | — | 41 | — |
| 2018 | 35 | 136 | — | — | — | 48 | — |

- Standings through 28 January 2018

=== Race podiums ===
- 3 wins – (1 DH, 2 SG)
- 10 podiums – (5 DH, 5 SG)

| Season | Date | Location | Discipline | Place |
|---|---|---|---|---|
| 2008 | 29 Feb 2008 | Kvitfjell, Norway | Downhill | 1st |
| 2008 | 1 Mar 2008 | Kvitfjell, Norway | Downhill | 3rd |
| 2009 | 19 Dec 2008 | Val Gardena, Italy | Super G | 1st |
| 2009 | 12 Mar 2009 | Åre, Sweden | Super G | 1st |
| 2010 | 28 Nov 2009 | Lake Louise, Canada | Downhill | 2nd |
| 2010 | 12 Dec 2009 | Val d'Isère, France | Super G | 3rd |
| 2010 | 23 Jan 2010 | Kitzbühel, Austria | Downhill | 3rd |
| 2013 | 14 Dec 2012 | Val Gardena, Italy | Super G | 3rd |
| 2013 | 3 Mar 2013 | Kvitfjell, Norway | Super G | 3rd |
| 2015 | 7 Mar 2015 | Kvitfjell, Norway | Downhill | 3rd |

== World Championship results ==
| Year | Age | Slalom | Giant slalom | Super-G | Downhill | Combined |
|---|---|---|---|---|---|---|
| 2007 | 24 | — | — | 27 | — | DNF1 |
| 2009 | 26 | — | — | 14 | 7 | — |
| 2011 | 28 | — | — | 8 | 22 | — |
| 2013 | 30 | — | — | 20 | 16 | — |
| 2015 | 32 | — | — | 26 | 32 | — |

== Olympic results ==
| Year | Age | Slalom | Giant slalom | Super-G | Downhill | Combined |
|---|---|---|---|---|---|---|
| 2010 | 27 | — | — | 4 | 12 | — |
| 2014 | 31 | — | — | 17 | 12 | — |

== Personal life ==
Heel has been in a relationship with fellow alpine skier Manuela Mölgg since 2009: as of 2018 the couple were engaged.
