= FIS Alpine World Ski Championships 2011 – Men's super-G =

Men's Super G
- Location: Garmisch Classic, Kandahar 2
- Vertical: 625 m (2,051 ft)
- Top elevation: 1,395 m (4,577 ft)
- Base elevation: 770 m (2,526 ft)

Complete results for Men's Super-G competition at the 2011 World Championships. It ran on February 9 at 11:00 local time, the second race of the championships. 73 athletes from 30 countries competed.

== Results ==
Rank	Bib	Name	Country	Time	Difference
1st place, gold medalist(s)	15	Christof Innerhofer	Italy	1:38.31	
2nd place, silver medalist(s)	12	Hannes Reichelt	Austria	1:38.91	+0.60
3rd place, bronze medalist(s)	19	Ivica Kostelić	Croatia	1:39.03	+0.72
4	18	Didier Cuche	Switzerland	1:39.34	+1.03
5	21	Benjamin Raich	Austria	1:39.65	+1.34
6	8	Romed Baumann	Austria	1:39.79	+1.48
7	16	Carlo Janka	Switzerland	1:40.03	+1.72
8	9	Werner Heel	Italy	1:40.13	+1.82
9	14	Peter Fill	Italy	1:40.34	+2.03
10	13	Adrien Théaux	France	1:40.44	+2.13
11	17	Michael Walchhofer	Austria	1:40.51	+2.20
12	11	Bode Miller	United States	1:41.06	+2.75
13	27	Silvan Zurbriggen	Switzerland	1:41.12	+2.81
14	24	Tommy Ford	United States	1:41.21	+2.90
15	25	Matteo Marsaglia	Italy	1:41.26	+2.95
16	4	Andrej Jerman	Slovenia	1:41.35	+3.04
17	45	Ondřej Bank	Czech Republic	1:41.36	+3.05
18	23	Travis Ganong	United States	1:41.49	+3.18
19	43	Benjamin Thomsen	Canada	1:41.92	+3.61
20	28	Andrej Šporn	Slovenia	1:42.20	+3.89
21	35	Andreas Sander	Germany	1:42.40	+4.09
22	1	Aleš Gorza	Slovenia	1:42.45	+4.14
23	5	Patrik Järbyn	Sweden	1:42.49	+4.18
24	48	Matts Olsson	Sweden	1:42.55	+4.24
25	3	Thomas Frey	France	1:42.81	+4.50
26	40	Natko Zrnčić-Dim	Croatia	1:43.15	+4.84
27	47	Stepan Zuev	Russia	1:43.63	+5.32
28	55	Truls Ove Karlsen	Norway	1:44.01	+5.70
29	57	Roger Vidosa	Andorra	1:44.84	+6.53
30	61	Georgi Georgiev	Bulgaria	1:45.23	+6.92
31	51	Tim Cafe	New Zealand	1:45.24	+6.93
32	41	Benjamin Griffin	New Zealand	1:45.63	+7.32
33	56	Nicola Kindle	Liechtenstein	1:46.75	+8.44
34	58	Yuri Danilochkin	Belarus	1:46.81	+8.50
35	68	Igor Zakurdaev	Kazakhstan	1:47.12	+8.81
36	66	Matej Falat	Slovakia	1:48.26	+9.95
37	63	Michał Kłusak	Poland	1:48.29	+9.98
38	65	Igor Laikert	Bosnia and Herzegovina	1:48.43	+10.12
39	60	Dmitriy Koshkin	Kazakhstan	1:49.07	+10.76
40	73	Rostyslav Feshchuk	Ukraine	1:49.79	+11.48
41	69	Taras Pimenov	Kazakhstan	1:51.04	+12.73
	29	Yannick Bertrand	France	DNS	
	71	Dimitri Gedevanishvili	Georgia	DNS	
	2	Ted Ligety	United States	DNF	
	6	Andrej Križaj	Slovenia	DNF	
	7	Sandro Viletta	Switzerland	DNF	
	10	Tobias Grünenfelder	Switzerland	DNF	
	20	Aksel Lund Svindal	Norway	DNF	
	22	Erik Guay	Canada	DNF	
	26	Alexis Pinturault	France	DNF	
	30	Kjetil Jansrud	Norway	DNF	
	31	Jan Hudec	Canada	DNF	
	32	Ed Drake	Great Britain	DNF	
	33	Petr Záhrobský	Czech Republic	DNF	
	34	Andreas Romar	Finland	DNF	
	36	Hans Olsson	Sweden	DNF	
	37	Tobias Stechert	Germany	DNF	
	38	Mirko Deflorian	Moldova	DNF	
	39	Paul de la Cuesta	Spain	DNF	
	42	Ferrán Terra	Spain	DNF	
	44	TJ Baldwin	(United Kingdom) Great Britain	DNF	
	46	Mark Syrovatka	Czech Republic	DNF	
	49	Kevin Esteve Rigail	Andorra	DNF	
	50	Maciej Bydliński	Poland	DNF	
	52	Tin Široki	Croatia	DNF	
	53	Jaroslav Babušiak	Slovakia	DNF	
	54	Aleksandr Khoroshilov	Russia	DNF	
	59	Cristian Javier Simari Birkner	Argentina	DNF	
	62	Nikola Chongarov	Bulgaria	DNF	
	64	Dalibor Šamšal	Croatia	DNF	
	67	Christoffer Faarup	Denmark	DNF	
	70	Pavel Chernichenko	Kazakhstan	DNF	
	72	Georg Lindner	Moldova	DNF	
