= Adam Žampa =

Slovak alpine skier (born 1990)

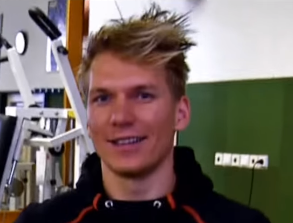
- Žampa in 2014

Personal information
- Born: 13 September 1990 (age 36) Kežmarok, Czechoslovakia
- Height: 1.78 m (5 ft 10 in)
- Website: http://www.adamzampa.com

Skiing career
- Sport: Alpine skiing
- Club: Žampa Ski Club Vysoké Tatry
- Disciplines: Slalom, giant slalom, combined
- World Cup debut: 14 November 2010 (age 20)

Olympics
- Teams: 2 – (2014, 2018)
- Medals: 0

World Championships
- Teams: 5 – (2009–2017)
- Medals: 1

World Cup
- Seasons: 11 – (2011–2021)
- Wins: 0
- Podiums: 0
- Overall titles: 0
- Discipline titles: 0
Medal record
Men's alpine skiing
Representing Slovakia
World Championships
Silver medal – second place	2017 St. Moritz	Team event
Winter Universiade
Silver medal – second place	2013 Trentino	Slalom

Adam Žampa (born 13 September 1990) is a Slovak alpine ski racer. His best result so far is the 5th place in combined at the 2014 Winter Olympics. His brothers are Andreas Žampa and Teo Žampa.

== Results ==
=== Winter Olympics ===
Žampa appeared at the Olympic Games for the first time in 2014. In his first Olympics, in combined, Žampa just missed a medal by 0.67 seconds and finished 5th, after finishing 21st (or 27th) in downhill ride and winning the slalom ride of the competition.

Year	Super-G	Giant slalom	Slalom	Combined	Team
(Russia) 2014 Sochi	28th	22nd	6th	5th	-
(South Korea) 2018 Pyeongchang	—	25th	23rd	22nd	5th
(China) 2022 Beijing	—	15th	25th	—	12th

=== FIS Alpine World Ski Championships ===
Year	Super-G	Giant slalom	Slalom	Combined	Team
(France) 2009 Val d'Isère	–	–	21st	–	—N/a
(Germany) 2011 Ga-Pa	–	DQ	24th	–	R16
(Austria) 2013 Schladming	36th	17th	15th	13th	R16
(United States) 2015 Vail-Beaver Creek	34th	DNF1	19th	19th	DNS
(Switzerland) 2017 St. Moritz	DNF	—	—	DNS2	2
(Sweden) 2019 Åre	—	DNF2	DNS2	—	5
(Italy) 2021 Cortina d'Ampezzo	—	8	DNS1	—	—

=== World Cup ===
Year	Overall	Giant slalom	Slalom	Combined	Age
2011	Not classified				20
2012	Not classified				21
2013	83rd	32nd	45th	31st	22
2014	91st	–	37th	22nd	23
2015	66th	–	32nd	9th	24
2016	77th	41st	42nd	12th	25
2017	101st	–	43rd	23rd	26
2018	101st	45th	37th	–	27
2019	116th	40th	–	–	28
2020	120th	35th	–	–	29
2021	66th	24th	–	–	30
2022	120th	38th	–	–	31

=== World cup top 20 results ===
- 0 wins
- 0 podiums

Season	Date	Location	Discipline	Place
2013	28 Oct 2012	Solden, Austria	Giant slalom	9th
2013	08 Dec 2012	Val d'Isere, France	Slalom	16th
2014	17 Nov 2013	Levi, Finland	Slalom	14th
2014	26 Jan 2014	Kitzbuehel, Austria	Combined	17th
2015	22 Dec 2014	Madonna di Campiglio, Italy	Slalom	19th
2015	16 Jan 2015	Wengen, Switzerland	Combined	15th
2015	23 Jan 2015	Kitzbuehel, Austria	Combined	7th
2015	15 Mar 2015	Kranjska Gora, Slovenia	Slalom	14th
2016	22 Jan 2016	Kitzbuehel, Austria	Combined	5th
2016	24 Jan 2016	Kitzbuehel, Austria	Slalom	20th
2017	29 Dec 2016	Santa Caterina, Italy	Combined	17th
2018	3 Mar 2018	Kranjska Gora, Slovenia	Giant slalom	15th
2019	2 Dec 2018	(United States) Beaver Creek, USA	Giant slalom	19th
2020	22 Feb 2020	Naeba, Japan	Giant slalom	17th
2021	5 Dec 2020	Santa Caterina, Italy	Giant slalom	7th
2021	7 Dec 2020	Santa Caterina, Italy	Giant slalom	8th
2021	27 Feb 2021	Bansko, Bulgaria	Giant slalom	19th
2021	20 Mar 2021	Lenzerheide, Switzerland	Giant slalom	17th
