= FIS Alpine World Ski Championships 2009 – Men's slalom =

Men's Slalom competition at the 2009 World Championships was run on February 15, the final race of the championships.

== Results ==
Rank	Name	Country	1st run	2nd run	Total	Diff.
Gold	Manfred Pranger	(Austria)	52.49	51.68	1:44.17	--
Silver	Julien Lizeroux	(France)	52.98	51.50	1:44.48	+0.38
Bronze	Michael Janyk	(Canada)	54.37	51.33	1:45.70	+1.53
4	Felix Neureuther	(Germany)	54.98	50.91	1:45.89	+1.72
5	Mattias Hargin	(Sweden)	54.42	51.81	1:46.23	+2.06
6	Steve Missillier	(France)	55.18	51.28	1:46.46	+2.29
7	Patrick Thaler	(Italy)	55.46	51.08	1:46.54	+2.37
8	Krystof Kryzl	(Czech Republic)	54.37	52.20	1:46.57	+2.40
9	Urs Imboden	(Moldova)	54.88	51.84	1:46.72	+2.55
10	Jimmy Cochran	(United States)	55.98	50.85	1:46.83	+2.66
11	Lars Elton Myhre	(Norway)	55.61	51.85	1:47.46	+3.29
12	Aleksandr Khoroshilov	(Russia)	55.70	52.25	1:47.95	+3.78
13	Sandro Viletta	(Switzerland)	56.64	52.32	1:48.96	+4.79
14	Natko Zrncic-Dim	(Croatia)	57.07	52.54	1:49.61	+5.44
15	Stepan Zuev	(Russia)	57.57	53.20	1:50.77	+6.60
16	Stefan Georgiev	(Bulgaria)	59.46	54.25	1:53.71	+9.54
17	Noel Baxter	(United Kingdom)	57.08	56.96	1:54.04	+9.87
18	Jeroen van den Bogaert	(Belgium)	59.93	–	59.93	–
19	Ivan Kasakov	(Russia)	1:00.32	–	1:00.32	–
20	Alexander Schastnih	(Russia)	1:00.76	–	1:00.76	–
21	Adam Žampa	(Slovakia)	1:02.37	–	1:02.37	–
22	Tim Jitloff	(United States)	1:02.43	–	1:02.43	–
23	Simon Stancel	(Slovakia)	1:08.14	–	1:08.14	–
–	Björgvin Björgvinsson	(Iceland)	57.27	DSQ	–	–
–	Truls Ove Karlsen	(Norway)	57.64	DSQ	–	–
–	Thomas Grandi	(Canada)	55.06	DSQ	–	–
–	Jens Byggmark	(Sweden)	54.36	DSQ	–	–
–	Benjamin Raich	(Austria)	54.00	DSQ	–	–
–	Marcus Sandell	(Finland)	57.24	DNF	–	–
–	Jukka Leino	(Finland)	55.06	DNF	–	–
–	Silvan Zurbriggen	(Switzerland)	54.81	DNF	–	–
–	Bernard Vajdic	(Slovenia)	55.40	DNF	–	–
–	Ted Ligety	(United States)	53.43	DNF	–	–
–	Johan Brolenius	(Sweden)	52.53	DNF	–	–
–	Manfred Mölgg	(Italy)	53.46	DNF	–	–
–	Jean-Baptiste Grange	(France)	52.76	DNF	–	–
–	Iason Abramashvili	(Georgia (country))	DSQ	–	–	–
–	Tim Cafe	(New Zealand)	DSQ	–	–	–
–	Filip Trejbal	(Czech Republic)	DSQ	–	–	–
–	Alexandre Anselmet	(France)	DSQ	–	–	–
–	Trevor White	(Canada)	DSQ	–	–	–
–	Marcel Hirscher	(Austria)	DSQ	–	–	–
–	Stefan Jon Sigurgeirsson	(Iceland)	DNF	–	–	–
–	Antonio Ristevski	(North Macedonia)	DNF	–	–	–
–	Guillem Capdevila	(Spain)	DNF	–	–	–
–	Tin Siroki	(Croatia)	DNF	–	–	–
–	Jaroslav Babusiak	(Slovakia)	DNF	–	–	–
–	Christophe Roux	(Moldova)	DNF	–	–	–
–	Maciej Bydlinski	(Poland)	DNF	–	–	–
–	Kai Alaerts	(Belgium)	DNF	–	–	–
–	Danko Marinelli	(Croatia)	DNF	–	–	–
–	Joery van Rooij	(Netherlands)	DNF	–	–	–
–	Alwin de Quartel	(Netherlands)	DNF	–	–	–
–	Georgi Georgiev	(Bulgaria)	DNF	–	–	–
–	David Ryding	(United Kingdom)	DNF	–	–	–
–	Kentaro Minagawa	(Japan)	DNF	–	–	–
–	Cristian Javier Simari Birkner	(Argentina)	DNF	–	–	–
–	Jono Brauer	(Australia)	DNF	–	–	–
–	Dalibor Samsal	(Croatia)	DNF	–	–	–
–	Kjetil Jansrud	(Norway)	DNF	–	–	–
–	Kilian Albrecht	(Bulgaria)	DNF	–	–	–
–	Stefan Kogler	(Germany)	DNF	–	–	–
–	Akira Sasaki	(Japan)	DNF	–	–	–
–	Julien Cousineau	(Canada)	DNF	–	–	–
–	Marc Berthod	(Switzerland)	DNF	–	–	–
–	Naoki Yuasa	(Japan)	DNF	–	–	–
–	Marc Gini	(Switzerland)	DNF	–	–	–
–	Mitja Valencic	(Slovenia)	DNF	–	–	–
–	Mitja Dragsic	(Slovenia)	DNF	–	–	–
–	Giuliano Razzoli	(Italy)	DNF	–	–	–
–	Mario Matt	(Austria)	DNF	–	–	–
–	Bode Miller	(United States)	DNF	–	–	–
–	Andre Myhrer	(Sweden)	DNF	–	–	–
–	Reinfried Herbst	(Austria)	DNF	–	–	–
–	Giorgio Rocca	(Italy)	DNF	–	–	–
