= FIS Alpine World Ski Championships 2009 – Men's super combined =

Men's super combined competition at the FIS Alpine World Ski Championships 2009 was run on 9 February, the sixth race of the championships.

== Results ==
Rank	Name	Country	Time	Diff.	Downhill	Slalom
1st place, gold medalist(s)	Aksel Lund Svindal	Norway	2:23.00	--	1:30.99	52.01
2nd place, silver medalist(s)	Julien Lizeroux	France	2:23.90	+0.90	1:33.92	49.98
3rd place, bronze medalist(s)	Natko Zrnčić-Dim	Croatia	2:24.58	+1.58	1:32.59	51.99
4	Silvan Zurbriggen	Switzerland	2:24.59	+1.59	1:32.94	51.65
5	Peter Fill	Italy	2:24.96	+1.96	1:33.23	51.73
6	Sandro Viletta	Switzerland	2:25.07	+2.07	1:33.21	51.86
6	Thomas Mermillod-Blondin	France	2:25.07	+2.07	1:33.88	51.19
8	Romed Baumann	Austria	2:25.21	+2.21	1:32.74	52.47
9	Kjetil Jansrud	Norway	2:25.30	+2.30	1:32.70	52.60
10	Aleksandr Khoroshilov	Russia	2:25.91	+2.91	1:33.94	51.97
11	Kryštof Krýzl	Czech Republic	2:26.22	+3.22	1:33.00	53.22
12	Andrej Jerman	Slovenia	2:26.32	+3.32	1:32.30	54.02
13	Ivan Ratkić	Croatia	2:26.68	+3.68	1:34.01	52.67
14	Tin Široki	Croatia	2:27.11	+4.11	1:33.70	53.41
15	Christof Innerhofer	Italy	2:27.37	+4.37	1:32.73	54.64
16	Niklas Rainer	Sweden	2:27.43	+4.43	1:33.16	54.27
17	Hans Olsson	Sweden	2:27.46	+4.46	1:34.43	53.03
18	Patrick Staudacher	Italy	2:27.48	+4.48	1:32.80	54.68
19	Jaroslav Babusiak	Slovakia	2:27.65	+4.65	1:34.26	53.39
20	Stephan Keppler	Germany	2:27.82	+4.82	1:34.11	53.71
21	Stefan Thanei	Italy	2:29.63	+6.63	1:31.90	54.73
22	Stefan Georgiev	Bulgaria	2:30.31	+7.31	1:35.75	54.56
23	Maciej Bydliński	Poland	2:33.52	+10.52	1:35.91	57.61
–	Ted Ligety	United States	DQ	–	DQ	--
–	Lars Elton Myhre	Norway	DQ	–	1:31.30	DQ
–	Edward Drake	United Kingdom	DQ	–	1:33.71	DQ
–	Georgi Georgiev	Bulgaria	DNF	–	DNF	--
–	Paul Stutz	Canada	DNF	–	1:34.91	DNF
–	Marcel Hirscher	Austria	DNF	–	1:33.42	DNF
–	John Kucera	Canada	DNF	–	1:34.41	DNS
–	Ales Gorza	Slovenia	DNF	–	1:33.68	DNF
–	Benjamin Raich	Austria	DNF	–	DNF	--
–	Bode Miller	United States	DNF	–	1:31.03	DNF
–	Jean-Baptiste Grange	France	DNF	–	1:32.09	DNF
–	Carlo Janka	Switzerland	DNF	–	1:34.35	DNS
–	Andrew Weibrecht	United States	DNF	–	1:35.31	DNS
–	Adrien Théaux	France	DNF	–	1:31.90	DNF
–	Erik Fisher	United States	DNF	–	1:34.30	DNS
–	Bernhard Graf	Austria	DNF	–	1:34.18	DNF
–	Stepan Zuev	Russia	DNF	–	1:34.71	DNF
–	Rok Perko	Slovenia	DNF	–	1:35.34	DNS
–	Petr Záhrobský	Czech Republic	DNF	–	1:37.30	DNS
–	Douglas Crawford	United Kingdom	DNF	–	1 :34.49	DNF
–	Stefán Jón Sigurgeirsson	Iceland	DNF	–	1:38.80	DNF
–	Nikola Chongarov	Bulgaria	DNF	–	1:37.45	DNF
–	Paul de la Cuesta	Spain	DNF	–	DNF	--
–	Ferran Terra	Spain	DNF	–	1:35.21	DNF
–	Árni Thorvaldsson	Iceland	DNF	–	1:40.42	DNS
–	Robbie Dixon	Canada	DNF	–	DNF	--
