= Ondřej Bank =

Czech alpine skier (born 1980)

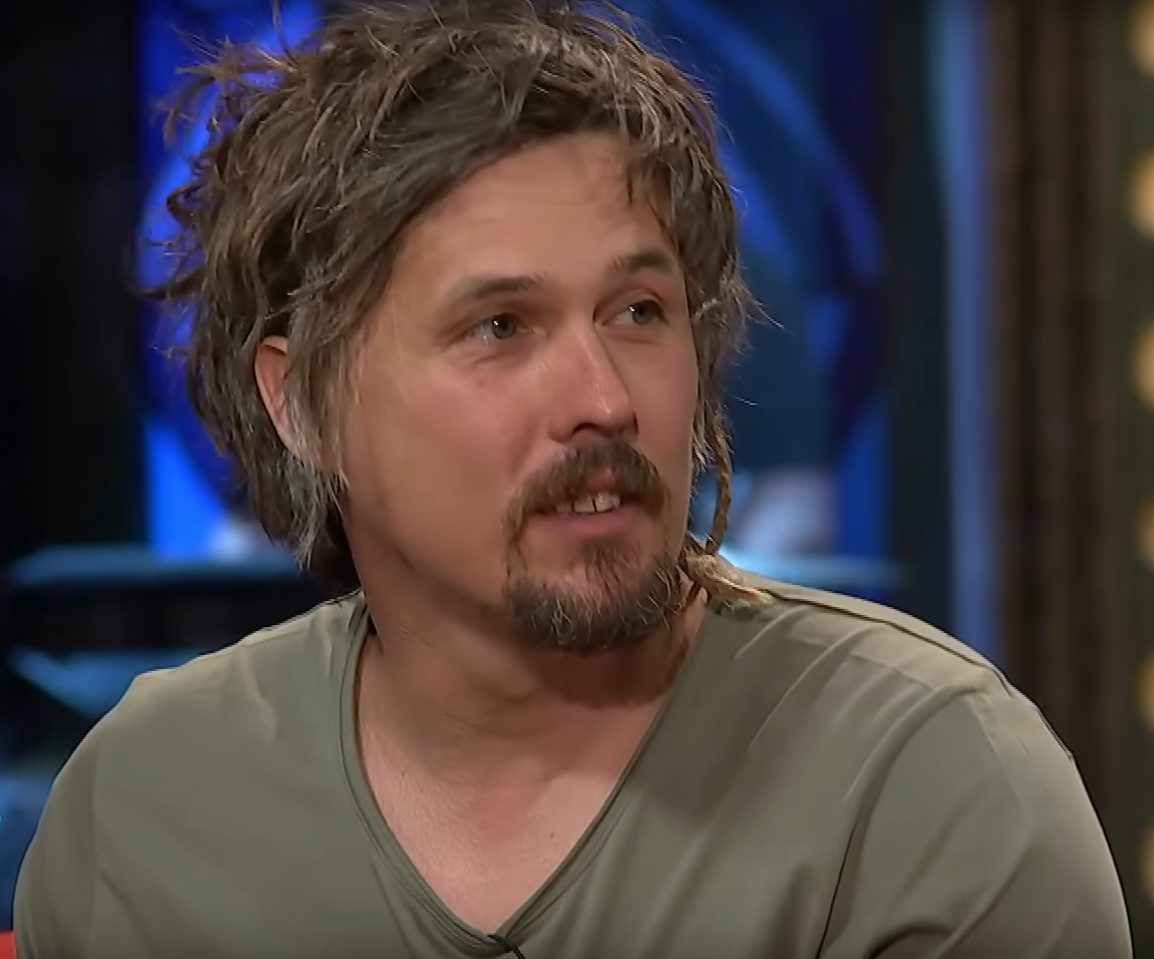

Personal information
- Born: 27 October 1980 (age 45) Zábřeh na Moravě, Olomouc, Czechoslovakia
- Height: 176 cm (5 ft 9 in)

Skiing career
- Sport: Alpine skiing
- Club: Dukla Liberec
- Retired: 16 January 2016 (age 35)
- Disciplines: Combined, Downhill, Super-G
- World Cup debut: 9 January 2001 (age 20)

Olympics
- Teams: 4 – (2002, 2006 2010, 2014)
- Medals: 0

World Championships
- Teams: 7 – (2001–2015)
- Medals: 0

World Cup
- Seasons: 9 – (2004–2015)
- Wins: 0
- Podiums: 2 – (2 SC)
- Overall titles: 0 – (26th in 2011)
- Discipline titles: 0 – (7th in SC, 2011)

Ondřej Bank (Czech pronunciation: [ˈondr̝ɛj ˈbaŋk]; born 27 October 1980) is a Czech retired World Cup alpine ski racer.

Born in Zábřeh na Moravě, Bank began his international career in 1995 when he first competed at the Junior World Championship. His first World Cup race was in January 2001. Bank is a specialist in the combined event, and his two podiums came at Beaver Creek and Kitzbühel.

His biggest achievement is fifth place in the Giant Slalom at the 2014 Winter Olympics in Sochi. At the time, it was the best Czech Olympic skiing result since Peter Jurko placed fifth in the combined in 1988 at Calgary Olympics. On 22 February 2016 he announced that he would retire from skiing after bad results in the 2016 season. He didn't win any points with 10 starts. His last race was on 16 January 2016, a downhill in Wengen.

== World Cup results ==
=== Season standings ===
Season	Age	Overall	Slalom	Giant slalom	Super-G	Downhill	Combined
2004	23	93	—	—	—	—	8
2005	24	126	—	48	—	—	—
2006	25	98	—	—	—	—	22
2007	26	84	42	—	—	—	20
2008	27	74	44	—	—	—	17
2009	28	Unranked	0 points				
2010	29	55	45	23	—	—	16
2011	30	26	27	14	59	40	7
2012	31	Unranked	0 points				
2013	32	Unranked	0 points				
2014	33	100	—	38	—	55	25
2015	34	41	—	35	38	31	5
2016	35	Unranked	0 points				

=== Race podiums ===
- 2 podiums – (2 SC)

Season	Date	Location	Discipline	Place
2008	29 Nov 2007	Beaver Creek, United States	Super Combined	3rd
2015	23 Jan 2015	Kitzbühel, Austria	Super Combined	3rd

== World Championships results ==
Year	Location	Age	Slalom	Giant slalom	Super-G	Downhill	Combined
2001	St. Anton, Austria	20	DNF2	26	—	—	6
2003	St.Moritz, Switzerland	22	DNF2	DNF1	41	37	16
2005	Bormio, Italy	24	DNF2	24	26	DNF	16
2007	Åre, Sweden	26	DNF1	17	36	35	10
2009	Val-d'Isère, France	28	—	—	—	—	—
2011	Garmisch, Germany	30	DNF1	19	17	21	5
2013	Schladming, Austria	32	—	DNS1	—	27	11
2015	Beaver Creek, USA	34	—	—	DNF	7	DSQ1

== Olympic results ==
Year	Location	Age	Slalom	Giant slalom	Super-G	Downhill	Combined
2002	Salt Lake City, United States	21	DNF2	DNF1	DNS	39	DNF3
2006	Turin, Italy	25	DNS1	16	DNF	DNF	6
2010	Vancouver, Canada	29	11	17	—	30	7
2014	Sochi, Russia	33	DNS1	5	9	20	7
