= FIS Alpine World Ski Championships 2009 – Men's giant slalom =

Men's giant slalom competition at the 2009 World Championships was run on February 13, the eighth race of the championships.

== Results ==
Rank	Name	Country	1st run	2nd run	Total	Diff.
1st place, gold medalist(s)	Carlo Janka	Switzerland	1:08.25	1:10.57	2:18.82	--
2nd place, silver medalist(s)	Benjamin Raich	Austria	1:08.73	1:10.80	2:19.53	+0.71
3rd place, bronze medalist(s)	Ted Ligety	United States	1:09.96	1:09.85	2:19.81	+0.99
4	Marcel Hirscher	Austria	1:09.40	1:10.48	2:19.88	+1.06
5	Massimiliano Blardone	Italy	1:09.21	1:11.28	2:20.49	+1.67
6	Didier Cuche	Switzerland	1:09.38	1:11.13	2:20.51	+1.69
7	Jean-Baptiste Grange	France	1:09.90	1:10.67	2:20.57	+1.75
8	Alexander Ploner	Italy	1:10.24	1:10.36	2:20.60	+1.78
9	Aksel Lund Svindal	Norway	1:10.46	1:10.15	2:20.61	+1.79
10	Marc Berthod	Switzerland	1:10.55	1:10.21	2:20.76	+1.94
11	Davide Simoncelli	Italy	1:10.59	1:10.27	2:20.86	+2.04
12	Manfred Mölgg	Italy	1:09.44	1:11.71	2:21.15	+2.33
13	Truls Ove Karlsen	Norway	1:10.20	1:11.05	2:21.25	+2.43
14	Philipp Schörghofer	Austria	1:09.84	1:11.46	2:21.30	+2.48
15	Gauthier de Tessieres	France	1:10.85	1:10.80	2:21.65	+2.83
16	Marcus Sandell	Finland	1:11.77	1:09.95	2:21.72	+2.90
17	Jukka Leino	Finland	1:11.76	1:10.51	2:22.27	+3.45
18	Bernard Vajdic	Slovenia	1:11.31	1:11.28	2:22.59	+3.77
19	Felix Neureuther	Germany	1:12.11	1:10.55	2:22.66	+3.84
20	Didier Défago	Switzerland	1:10.78	1:11.92	2:22.70	+3.88
21	Robbie Dixon	Canada	1:12.27	1:10.57	2:22.84	+4.02
22	Krystof Kryzl	Czech Republic	1:12.60	1:10.29	2:22.89	+4.07
23	Ales Gorza	Slovenia	1:11.35	1:11.67	2:23.02	+4.20
24	Niklas Rainer	Sweden	1:12.64	1:10.85	2:23.49	+4.67
25	Cristian Javier Simari Birkner	Argentina	1:12.48	1:11.82	2:24.30	+5.48
26	Tim Jitloff	United States	1:12.09	1:12.46	2:24.55	+5.73
27	Natko Zrncic-Dim	Croatia	1:13.53	1:11.21	2:24.74	+5.92
28	Sergei Maitakov	Russia	1:12.91	1:13.01	2:25.92	+7.10
29	Naoki Yuasa	Japan	1:13.36	1:13.43	2:26.79	+7.97
30	Hannes Reichelt	Austria	1:13.58	–	1:13.58	–
31	Jono Brauer	Australia	1:13.67	–	1:13.67	–
32	Michael Janyk	Canada	1:13.76	–	1:13.76	–
33	Ferran Terra	Spain	1:13.88	–	1:13.88	–
34	Stepan Zuev	Russia	1:14.08	–	1:14.08	–
35	Noel Baxter	United Kingdom	1:14.55	–	1:14.55	–
36	Christophe Roux	Moldova	1:14.83	–	1:14.83	–
37	Tin Siroki	Croatia	1:14.87	–	1:14.87	–
38	Jaroslav Babusiak	Slovakia	1:14.91	–	1:14.91	–
39	Kiril Manolov	Bulgaria	1:15.05	–	1:15.05	–
40	Dalibor Samsal	Croatia	1:15.19	–	1:15.19	–
41	David Ryding	United Kingdom	1:15.41	–	1:15.41	–
42	Nikola Chongarov	Bulgaria	1:15.60	–	1:15.60	–
43	Stefan Georgiev	Bulgaria	1:15.63	–	1:15.63	–
44	John Kucera	Canada	1:15.83	–	1:15.83	–
45	Bryce Stevens	Australia	1:15.96	–	1:15.96	–
46	Paul de la Cuesta	Spain	1:15.97	–	1:15.97	–
46	Tim Cafe	New Zealand	1:15.97	–	1:15.97	–
48	Guillem Capdevila	Spain	1:16.10	–	1:16.10	–
49	Andrew Noble	United Kingdom	1:18.09	–	1:18.09	–
50	Joery van Rooij	Netherlands	1:18.25	–	1:18.25	–
51	Hugh Stevens	Australia	1:19.07	–	1:19.07	–
52	Jorge Mandru	Chile	1:19.90	–	1:19.90	–
53	Danko Marinelli	Croatia	1:29.32	–	1:29.32	–
–	Adam Zampa	Slovakia	DNS	–	–	–
–	Bode Miller	United States	1:10.97	DNF	–	–
–	Stefan Jon Sigurgeirsson	Iceland	DNF	–	–	–
–	Jorge Martinic	Chile	DNF	–	–	–
–	Christian Geiger	Australia	DNF	–	–	–
–	Ioan-Gabriel Nan	Romania	DNF	–	–	–
–	Alwin de Quartel	Netherlands	DNF	–	–	–
–	Agustin Torres	Argentina	DNF	–	–	–
–	Iason Abramashvili	Georgia	DNF	–	–	–
–	Diego Jimenez	Spain	DNF	–	–	–
–	Jeroen van den Bogaert	Belgium	DNF	–	–	–
–	Aleksandr Khoroshilov	Russia	DNF	–	–	–
–	Olivier Jenot	Monaco	DNF	–	–	–
–	Jens Byggmark	Sweden	DNF	–	–	–
–	Akira Sasaki	Japan	DNF	–	–	–
–	Björgvin Björgvinsson	Iceland	DNF	–	–	–
–	Jake Zamansky	United States	DNF	–	–	–
–	Andre Myhrer	Sweden	DNF	–	–	–
–	Jean-Philippe Roy	Canada	DNF	–	–	–
–	Thomas Fanara	France	DNF	–	–	–
–	Cyprien Richard	France	DNF	–	–	–
–	Kjetil Jansrud	Norway	DNF	–	–	–
