= Kryštof Krýzl =

Czech alpine skier (born 1986)

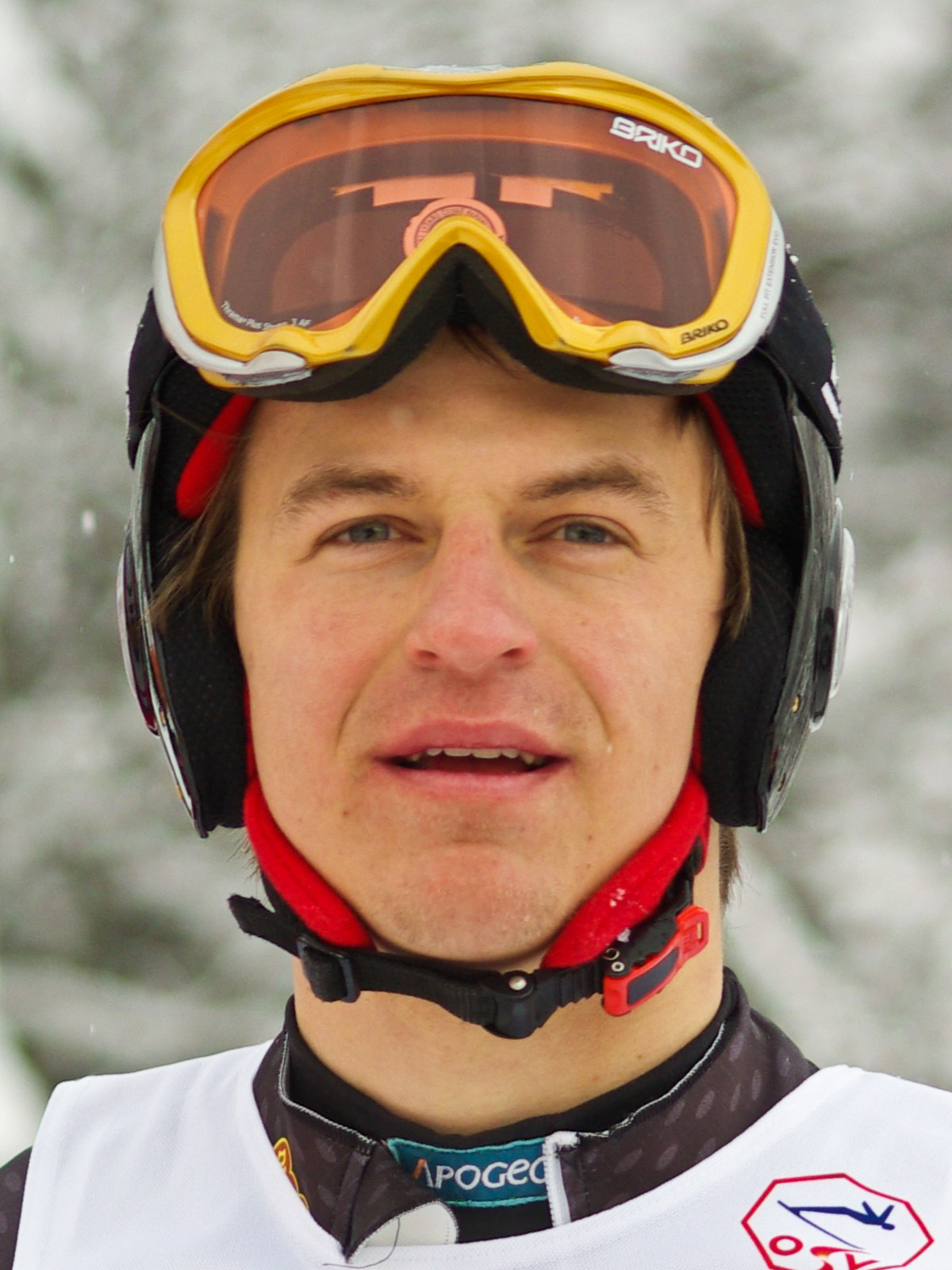
- Kryštof Krýzl in March 2009

Personal information
- Born: 12 October 1986 (age 39) Prague, Czechoslovakia

Skiing career
- Sport: Alpine skiing
- Disciplines: Slalom, giant slalom, combined
- World Cup debut: 23 October 2005 (age 19)

Olympics
- Teams: 3 (2006, 2010, 2014)

World Championships
- Teams: 8 – (2005–19)

World Cup
- Seasons: 14 – (2006–19)
Medal record
Men's alpine skiing
Representing Czech Republic
Winter Universiade
Silver medal – second place	2013 Trentino	Slalom

Kryštof Krýzl (Czech pronunciation: [ˈkrɪʃtof ˈkriːzl̩], born 12 October 1986) is a Czech alpine skier. Krýzl has appeared in the 2006 Winter Olympics in Turin, the 2010 Winter Olympics in Vancouver, the 2014 Winter Olympics in Sochi, the 2022 Winter Olympics in Beijing and at the 2005, 2007, 2011 and 2013 World Championships.

== Career ==
=== World Cup ===
He made his World Cup debut in 2005 in Sölden, and since this date his best result is 9th, on 12 December 2008 in Val-d'Isère. In addition, he has finished in the top 20 eleven times (through 7 January 2017).

=== Season standings ===
Season	Age	Overall	Slalom	Giant Slalom	Super-G	Downhill	Combined
2008	21	116	58	—	—	—	43
2009	22	76	36	45	—	—	19
2010	23	109	48	38	—	—	—
2011	24	150	—	—	—	—	44
2012	25	77	30	43	—	—	40
2013	26	87	33	—	—	—	—
2014	27	113	48	41	—	—	41
2015	28	118	53	45	—	—	40
2016	29	99	—	37	58	—	35
2017	30	81	45	37	—	—	19

=== Results per discipline ===
Discipline	WC starts	WC Top 30	WC Top 15	WC Top 5	WC Podium	Best result		
Discipline	WC starts	WC Top 30	WC Top 15	WC Top 5	WC Podium	Date	Location	Place
Slalom	98	21	3	0	0	8 January 2012	Adelboden, Switzerland	12th
Giant slalom	65	14	1	0	0	7 January 2017	Adelboden, Switzerland	14th
Super-G	6	1	0	0	0	5 December 2015	Beaver Creek, United States	29th
Downhill	4	0	0	0	0	4 February 2012	Chamonix, France	56th
Combined	21	14	2	0	0	12 December 2008	Val-d'Isère, France	9th
Total	194	50	6	0	0			

- Standings through 2 February 2019

== Olympic results ==
Year
Year	Age	Slalom	Giant; Slalom	Super G	Downhill	Combined
2006	19	DNF1	DNF1	34	—	20
2010	23	DSQ1	23	—	40	17
2014	27	DNF2	DNF1	—	—	19
2018	31	not run				
2022	35	—	19	—	—	—

== World Championship results ==
Year
Year	Age	Slalom	Giant; Slalom	Super G	Downhill	Combined	Team Event
2005	18	22	—	—	—	DNF1	—
2007	20	DNF1	DNF1	42	—	—	—
2009	22	8	22	26	—	11	—N/a
2011	24	39	31	—	—	—	—
2013	26	20	—	—	—	—	—
2015	28	DNF1	23	35	—	26	—
2017	30	DSQ1	32	DNF	—	29	9
2019	32	DNF1	—	41	—	—	—

== Winter Universiade results ==
Year
Year	Age	Slalom	Giant; Slalom	Super G	Downhill	Combined
2013	26	3	DNF1	—	—	—
