= Sam Robertson (disambiguation) =

Sam Robertson (born 1985) is a Scottish actor.

Sam or Samuel Robertson may also refer to:

- Sam Robertson (American football), American football coach with Southwestern Louisiana, 1980–1985
- Sam Robertson (skier), Australian alpine ski racer
- Samuel M. Robertson (1852–1911), American politician
- Samuel Robertson (Medal of Honor), United States Army soldier and Medal of Honor recipient

== See also ==
- Samuel Robertson Technical Secondary School, a high school in Maple Ridge, British Columbia
