= Sigurgeirsson =

Sigurgeirsson is a surname. Notable people with the surname include:

- Ásgeir Sigurgeirsson (born 1985), Icelandic sport shooter who competes in the men's 10 metre air pistol
- Pétur Sigurgeirsson (1919–2010), the Bishop of Iceland from 1981 to 1989
- Rúnar Þór Sigurgeirsson (born 1999), Icelandic footballer
- Stefan Jon Sigurgeirsson (born 1989), alpine skier from Iceland
