= Tin Široki =

Croatian alpine skier (born 1987)

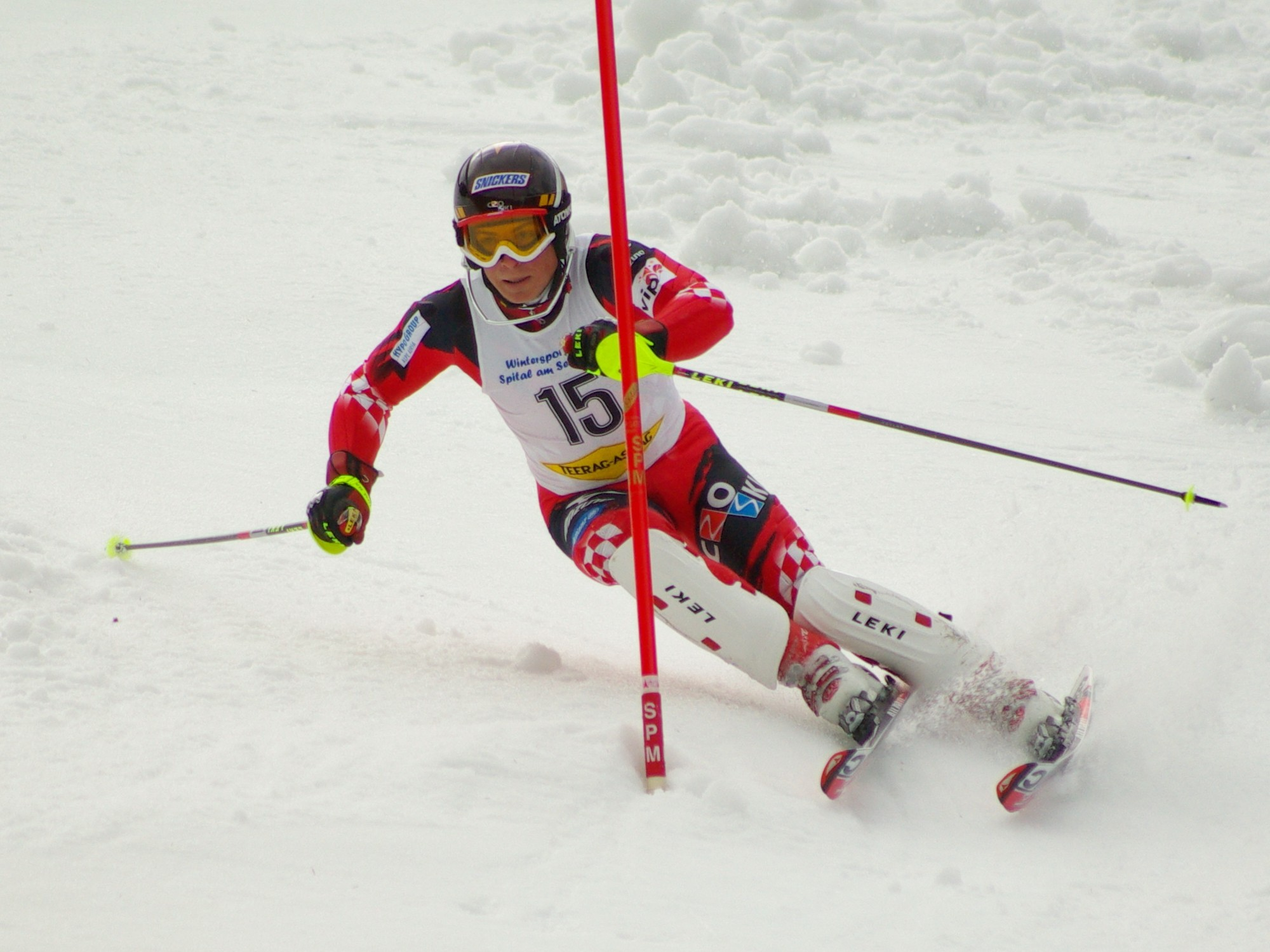
- Tin Široki in 2008

Personal information
- Born: 29 April 1987 (age 39) Zagreb, Yugoslavia

Skiing career
- Sport: Alpine skiing
- Disciplines: Downhill, combined
- World Cup debut: 27 January 2008 (age 20)

Olympics
- Teams: 1 (2006)

World Championships
- Teams: 3 – (2007–11)

World Cup
- Seasons: 5 – (2008–12)
- Overall titles: 0 – (147th in 2012)
- Discipline titles: 0 – (44th in KB, 2011)

Tin Široki (born 29 April 1987) is a Croatian alpine skier. He competed in the men's combined at the 2006 Winter Olympics.

== World Cup results ==
=== Season standings ===
Season
Season	Age	Overall	Slalom	Giant; Slalom	Super G	Downhill	Combined
2011	23	150	—	—	—	—	44
2012	24	147	—	—	—	—	45

=== Results per discipline ===
Discipline	WC starts	WC Top 30	WC Top 15	WC Top 5	WC Podium	Best result		
Discipline	WC starts	WC Top 30	WC Top 15	WC Top 5	WC Podium	Date	Location	Place
Slalom	2	0	0	0	0	6 January 2011	Zagreb, Croatia	65th
Giant slalom	1	0	0	0	0	21 February 2009	Sestriere, Italy	50th
Super-G	4	0	0	0	0	4 December 2010	Beaver Creek, United States	46th
Downhill	14	0	0	0	0	29 November 2008	Lake Louise, Canada	38th
Combined	11	4	1	0	0	23 January 2011	Kitzbühel, Austria	13th
Total	32	4	1	0	0			

== World Championship results ==
Year
Year	Age	Slalom	Giant; Slalom	Super G	Downhill	Combined	Team Event
2007	19	—	—	52	48	DNF1	—
2009	21	DNF1	37	DNF	23	14	—N/a
2011	23	—	DNF1	DNF	DNF	18	8

== Olympic results ==
Year
Year	Age	Slalom	Giant; Slalom	Super G	Downhill	Combined
2006	18	—	—	—	—	26
