= FIS Alpine World Ski Championships 2011 – Men's super combined =

Complete results for Men's Super Combined competition at the 2011 World Championships. It ran on February 14 at 10:00 local time (downhill) and 14:00 local time (slalom), the sixth race of the championships. 41 athletes from 18 countries competed.

== Results ==
Rank	Bib	Name	Nation	Downhill	Rank	Slalom	Rank	Total	Difference
1st place, gold medalist(s)	21	Aksel Lund Svindal	Norway	1:59.49	1	55.02	7	2:54.51	
2nd place, silver medalist(s)	22	Christof Innerhofer	Italy	2:00.67	3	54.85	6	2:55.52	+1.01
3rd place, bronze medalist(s)	15	Peter Fill	Italy	2:00.83	4	55.58	9	2:56.41	+1.90
4	17	Benjamin Raich	Austria	2:02.50	12	54.18	2	2:56.68	+2.17
5	7	Ondřej Bank	Czech Republic	2:01.00	5	55.90	12	2:56.90	+2.39
6	10	Paolo Pangrazzi	Italy	2:02.66	14	54.69	5	2:57.35	+2.84
7	2	Lars Elton Myhre	Norway	2:03.39	18	54.11	1	2:57.50	+2.99
8	13	Natko Zrnčić-Dim	Croatia	2:03.25	16	54.46	4	2:57.71	+3.20
9	26	Andreas Romar	Finland	2:01.19	7	56.86	18	2:58.05	+3.54
10	16	Kjetil Jansrud	Norway	2:02.56	13	55.86	11	2:58.42	+3.91
11	6	Georgi Georgiev	Bulgaria	2:02.74	15	56.12	14	2:58.86	+4.35
12	12	Joachim Puchner	Austria	2:03.26	17	55.70	10	2:58.96	+4.45
13	28	Björn Sieber	Austria	2:03.49	19	55.95	13	2:59.44	+4.93
14	39	Mirko Deflorian	Moldova	2:04.00	22	56.29	15	3:00.29	+5.78
14	1	Tim Jitloff	United States	2:06.02	29	54.27	3	3:00.29	+5.78
16	3	Ferrán Terra	Spain	2:03.70	20	57.31	19	3:01.01	+6.50
17	4	Martin Vráblík	Czech Republic	2:05.97	28	55.51	8	3:01.48	+6.97
18	30	Tin Široki	Croatia	2:04.74	24	56.78	17	3:01.52	+7.01
19	34	Jaroslav Babušiak	Slovakia	2:05.93	27	56.37	16	3:02.30	+7.79
20	33	Yuri Danilochkin	Belarus	2:04.63	23	57.74	20	3:02.37	+7.86
21	5	Kevin Esteve Rigail	Andorra	2:01.81	9	1:00.72	24	3:02.53	+8.02
22	31	Nikola Chongarov	Bulgaria	2:03.79	21	59.15	22	3:02.94	+8.43
23	36	Igor Laikert	Bosnia and Herzegovina	2:09.43	30	58.35	21	3:07.78	+13.27
24	32	Matej Falat	Slovakia	2:10.63	33	59.20	23	3:09.83	+15.32
25	40	Rostyslav Feshchuk	Ukraine	2:09.86	31	1:01.36	25	3:11.22	+16.71
26	41	Taras Pimenov	Kazakhstan	2:11.40	34	1:02.86	26	3:14.26	+19.85
27	35	Michał Kłusak	Poland	2:05.58	26	1:14.54	27	3:20.12	+25.51
28	23	Roger Vidosa	Andorra	2:04.89	25	1:20.36	28	3:25.25	+30.74
	8	Ted Ligety	United States	2:02.34	11	DNF			
	9	Dominik Paris	Italy	2:01.51	8	DNF			
	11	Beat Feuz	Switzerland	2:00.12	2	DNF			
	18	Silvan Zurbriggen	Switzerland	2:01.11	6	DNF			
	19	Bode Miller	United States	2:02.01	10	DNF			
	38	Dmitriy Koshkin	Kazakhstan	2:10.07	32	DNF			
	14	Hans Olsson	Sweden	DNF					
	20	Romed Baumann	Austria	DNF					
	24	Maciej Bydliński	Poland	DNF					
	25	Cristian Javier Simari Birkner	Argentina	DNF					
	27	Dalibor Šamšal	Croatia	DNF					
	29	TJ Baldwin	Great Britain	DNF					
	37	Roberts Rode	Latvia	DNF					
