= FIS Alpine World Ski Championships 2015 – Men's super-G =

Men's super-G at the FIS Alpine World Ski Championships 2015
- Venue: Birds of Prey; Beaver Creek, Colorado, U.S.
- Date: February 5, 2015
- Competitors: 65 from 28 nations
- Winning time: 1:15.68

Medalists
gold medal	Hannes Reichelt	Austria
silver medal	Dustin Cook	Canada
bronze medal	Adrien Théaux	France

The Men's super-G competition at the 2015 World Championships was held on Thursday, February 5.

== Results ==
The race was scheduled to start at 11:00 MST on February 4, but was postponed a day due to bad weather.

Rank	Bib	Name	Country	Time	Diff.
1st place, gold medalist(s)	20	Hannes Reichelt	Austria	1:15.68	
2nd place, silver medalist(s)	28	Dustin Cook	Canada	1:15.79	+0.11
3rd place, bronze medalist(s)	15	Adrien Théaux	France	1:15.92	+0.24
4	18	Matthias Mayer	Austria	1:15.95	+0.27
4	21	Kjetil Jansrud	Norway	1:15.95	+0.27
6	14	Aksel Lund Svindal	Norway	1:16.05	+0.37
7	17	Didier Défago	Switzerland	1:16.07	+0.39
8	8	Georg Streitberger	Austria	1:16.22	+0.54
9	26	Ted Ligety	United States	1:16.38	+0.70
10	31	Klemen Kosi	Slovenia	1:16.39	+0.71
11	11	Alexis Pinturault	France	1:16.42	+0.74
12	1	Brice Roger	France	1:16.50	+0.82
12	10	Carlo Janka	Switzerland	1:16.50	+0.82
14	2	Matteo Marsaglia	Italy	1:16.57	+0.89
14	22	Dominik Paris	Italy	1:16.57	+0.89
16	19	Patrick Küng	Switzerland	1:16.69	+1.01
17	25	Mauro Caviezel	Switzerland	1:16.84	+1.16
18	12	Christof Innerhofer	Italy	1:17.02	+1.34
19	4	Aleksander Aamodt Kilde	Norway	1:17.06	+1.38
20	13	Andrew Weibrecht	United States	1:17.12	+1.44
20	30	Steven Nyman	United States	1:17.12	+1.44
22	27	Morgan Pridy	Canada	1:17.30	+1.62
23	33	Andreas Sander	Germany	1:17.37	+1.69
24	16	Otmar Striedinger	Austria	1:17.39	+1.71
25	5	Josef Ferstl	Germany	1:17.50	+1.82
26	7	Werner Heel	Italy	1:17.53	+1.85
27	38	Benjamin Thomsen	Canada	1:17.64	+1.96
28	6	Klaus Brandner	Germany	1:17.83	+2.15
29	36	Martin Cater	Slovenia	1:18.10	+2.42
30	24	Johan Clarey	France	1:18.34	+2.66
31	48	Pavel Trikhichev	Russia	1:18.38	+2.70
32	35	Natko Zrnčić-Dim	Croatia	1:18.42	+2.74
33	40	Max Ullrich	Croatia	1:18.73	+3.05
34	51	Adam Žampa	Slovakia	1:18.82	+3.14
35	55	Kryštof Krýzl	Czech Republic	1:18.87	+3.19
36	56	Sam Robertson	Australia	1:19.29	+3.61
37	53	Arnaud Alessandria	Monaco	1:19.41	+3.73
38	46	Henrik von Appen	Chile	1:19.69	+4.01
39	41	Dean Travers	Cayman Islands	1:19.80	+4.12
40	47	Christoffer Faarup	Denmark	1:19.98	+4.30
41	60	Andreas Žampa	Slovakia	1:19.99	+4.31
42	49	Martin Vráblík	Czech Republic	1:20.39	+4.71
43	42	Cristian Javier Simari Birkner	Argentina	1:20.43	+4.75
44	57	Adam Barwood	New Zealand	1:20.80	+5.12
45	54	Istok Rodeš	Croatia	1:22.04	+6.36
46	61	Nicolas Carvallo	Chile	1:23.02	+7.34
47	59	Igor Zakurdayev	Kazakhstan	1:23.21	+7.53
48	63	Dmytro Mytsak	Ukraine	1:24.16	+8.48
49	65	Márton Kékesi	Hungary	1:25.84	+10.16
50	66	Igor Laikert	Bosnia and Herzegovina	1:26.22	+10.54
51	58	Eugenio Claro	Chile	1:30.07	+14.39
	50	Martin Khuber	Kazakhstan	DNS	
	3	Travis Ganong	United States	DNF	
	9	Bode Miller	United States	DNF	
	23	Manuel Osborne-Paradis	Canada	DNF	
	29	Ondřej Bank	Czech Republic	DNF	
	32	Ivica Kostelić	Croatia	DNF	
	34	Andreas Romar	Finland	DNF	
	37	Boštjan Kline	Slovenia	DNF	
	39	Aleksandr Glebov	Russia	DNF	
	43	Marvin van Heek	Netherlands	DNF	
	44	Nick Prebble	New Zealand	DNF	
	45	Maciej Bydliński	Poland	DNF	
	52	Willis Feasey	New Zealand	DNF	
	62	Ioan Valeriu Achiriloaie	Romania	DNF	
	64	Andrés Figueroa	Chile	DNF	
