= Natko Zrnčić-Dim =

Croatian alpine skier

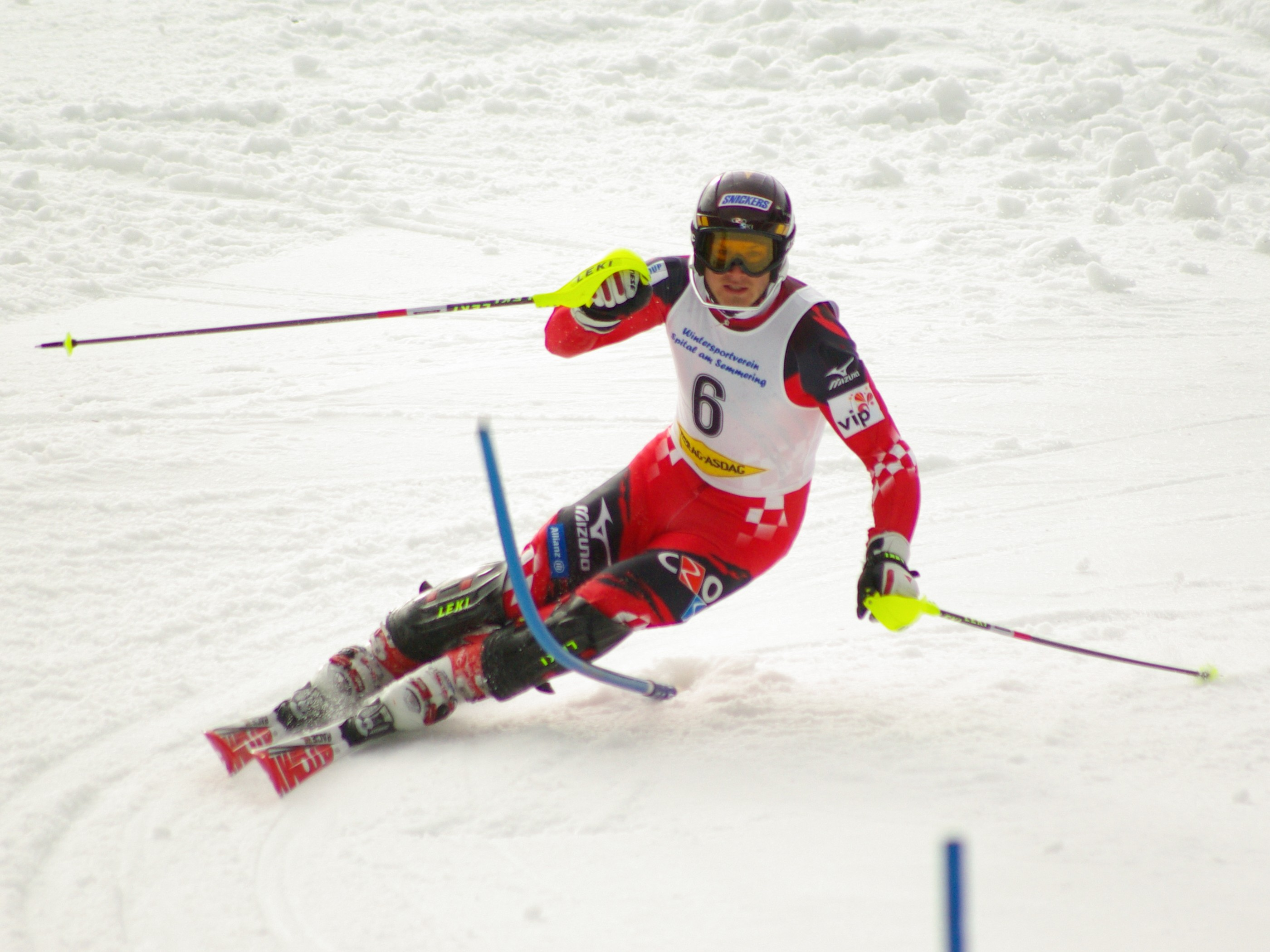
- Zrnčić-Dim in March 2008

Personal information
- Born: 7 March 1986 (age 40) Zagreb, SR Croatia, SFR Yugoslavia
- Height: 175 cm (5 ft 9 in)

Skiing career
- Sport: Alpine skiing
- Club: SK Medveščak
- Retired: 22 February 2019 (age 32)
- Disciplines: Combined, super-G, downhill, slalom
- World Cup debut: 13 December 2004 (age 18)

Olympics
- Teams: 3 – (2006, 2010, 2014)
- Medals: 0

World Championships
- Teams: 5 – (2005–11, 2015)
- Medals: 1 (0 gold)

World Cup
- Seasons: 14 – (2005–2016, 2018–2019)
- Wins: 0
- Podiums: 5 – (5 AC)
- Overall titles: 0 – (38th in 2010)
- Discipline titles: 0 – (5th in AC, 2014)
Medal record
Men's alpine skiing
Representing Croatia
World Championships
| Bronze medal – third place | 2009 Val-d'Isère | Combined |

Natko Zrnčić-Dim (Croatian pronunciation: [nǎtko zr̩̂ːntʃitɕ];), born 7 March 1986, is a Croatian alpine ski coach and retired World Cup skier. He won a bronze medal in super combined at the World Championships in 2009 at Val-d'Isère, France, and is a member of SK Medveščak. He competed at the four consecutive Winter Olympics (2006–2018). As of May 2026, he is coach of the Andorra national team.

Born in Zagreb, Zrnčić-Dim's best World Cup result is second place in a super combined, achieved on 30 January 2011 in Chamonix, France. Compatriot Ivica Kostelić won that race, his seventh of the month, and marked the first time that Croatians finished first and second in a World Cup race. Zrnčić-Dim incurred shoulder injury in a super-G at Beaver Creek in early December 2012, which ended his 2013 season. Through mid-January 2014, he has five World Cup podiums, all in combined events. He is one of rare downhill specialists who was able to qualify into second run of slalom. He has done it three times; all were in Wengen, having best result of 18th place in 2010.

In 2019 he announced his retirement from active competing, due to unsuccessful comeback after injury in November 2016. His last World Cup race was a combined in Bansko on 22 February 2019. Since the start of 2019/20 season, he coaches Rea Hraski to prepare for the 2019 Winter Deaflympics.

== World Cup results ==
=== Season standings ===
| Season | Age | Overall | Slalom | Giant slalom | Super-G | Downhill | Combined |
|---|---|---|---|---|---|---|---|
| 2006 | 19 | 137 | — | — | — | — | 44 |
| 2007 | 20 | 135 | — | — | — | — | 42 |
| 2008 | 21 | 58 | — | — | — | 46 | 8 |
| 2009 | 22 | 59 | 55 | — | — | 45 | 9 |
| 2010 | 23 | 38 | 48 | — | 48 | 30 | 7 |
| 2011 | 24 | 71 | — | — | — | 46 | 9 |
| 2012 | 25 | 67 | — | — | 57 | — | 10 |
| 2013 | 26 | injured 1 December 2012 | | | | | |
| 2014 | 27 | 75 | 52 | — | — | — | 5 |
| 2015 | 28 | 76 | — | — | 52 | — | 7 |
| 2016 | 29 | 97 | — | — | 54 | 54 | 15 |
| 2017 | 30 | injured in Val d'Isère training | | | | | |

=== Race podiums ===
- 5 podiums – 5 AC (4 SC, 1 K)

| Season | Date | Location | Discipline | Place |
|---|---|---|---|---|
| 2008 | 3 Feb 2008 | Val-d'Isère, France | Super combined | 3rd |
| 2009 | 25 Jan 2009 | Kitzbühel, Austria | Combined | 3rd |
| 2010 | 4 Dec 2009 | (United States) Beaver Creek, USA | Super combined | 3rd |
| 2011 | 30 Jan 2011 | Chamonix, France | Super combined | 2nd |
| 2014 | 17 Jan 2014 | Wengen, Switzerland | Super combined | 3rd |

=== Results per discipline ===
| Discipline | WC starts | WC Top 30 |
|---|---|---|
| Downhill | 75 | 11 |
| Super-G | 47 | 5 |
| Giant slalom | 8 | 0 |
| Slalom | 48 | 3 |
| Combined | 36 | 27 |
| Total | 214 | 46 |

- standings through 25 Nov 2018

== World Championship results ==
| Year | Age | Slalom | Giant slalom | Super-G | Downhill | Combined |
|---|---|---|---|---|---|---|
| 2005 | 18 | 31 | 40 | — | — | — |
| 2007 | 20 | — | 39 | 40 | 34 | DSQ |
| 2009 | 22 | 14 | 27 | 23 | 19 | 3 |
| 2011 | 24 | DNF1 | 38 | 26 | 28 | 8 |
| 2013 | 26 | — | — | — | — | — |
| 2015 | 28 | 27 | — | 32 | 30 | DNF2 |
| 2019 | 32 | — | — | 30 | DNS | 39 |

== Olympic results ==
| Year | Age | Slalom | Giant slalom | Super-G | Downhill | Combined |
|---|---|---|---|---|---|---|
| 2006 | 19 | 33 | 25 | 35 | — | 33 |
| 2010 | 23 | 19 | 41 | DNF | 33 | 20 |
| 2014 | 27 | DNF2 | — | 19 | 29 | 10 |

Winter Olympics
| Preceded by Ivica Kostelić | Flagbearer for Croatia; Pyeongchang 2018 | Succeeded by Zrinka Ljutić, Marko Skender |
