= Sam Robertson (skier) =

Australian alpine skier (born 1993)

Personal information
- Born: 1993 (age 32–33)

Skiing career
- Sport: Alpine skiing

Sam Robertson (born 1993) is an Australian alpine ski racer.

He competed at the 2015 World Championships in Beaver Creek, USA, in the Super-G.
