= Nicolas Carvallo =

Chilean alpine ski racer (born 1991)

Personal information
- Born: 1991 (age 34–35)

Skiing career
- Sport: Alpine skiing

Nicolas Carvallo (born 1991) is a Chilean alpine ski racer.

He competed at the 2015 World Championships in Beaver Creek, USA, in the Super-G.
