= Sebastian Brigović =

Croatian alpine skier (born 1992)

Personal information
- Born: 20 April 1992 (age 34) Rijeka, Croatia
- Height: 1.81 m (5 ft 11 in)
- Weight: 81 kg (179 lb)

Sebastian Brigović (born 20 April 1992 in Rijeka, Croatia) is a Croatian alpine skier. He competed for Croatia at the 2014 Winter Olympics in the giant slalom event.
