= Simon Lyons =

English footballer

Personal information
- Date of birth: 2 December 1982 (age 43)
- Place of birth: Watchet, Somerset, England
- Position: Midfielder

Team information
- Current team: Minehead

Youth career
- Arsenal
- –2000: Torquay United

Senior career*
Years	Team	Apps	(Gls)
2000–2002	Torquay United	9	(1)
2001	→Barnstaple Town (loan)		
- * Club domestic league appearances and goals

Simon R. Lyons (born 2 December 1982) is an English former professional footballer who plays for non-league Minehead.

Lyons, a midfielder, was born in Watchet, Somerset, and began his career as an apprentice with Arsenal before finishing his apprenticeship with Torquay United, turning professional in July 2000.

== Background ==
He made his first team debut in the FA Cup defeat away to Southend United on 28 November 2000, also playing in the Football League Trophy defeat at home to Bristol Rovers before making his league debut as a substitute on 16 December, in a 2–1 win away to Hull City. He made 8 further substitute appearances for the Gulls in their successful battle against relegation, but was left further out of the first-team picture with the arrival of Roy McFarland as manager in 2001.

In December 2001 he was loaned to non-league Barnstaple Town and was released by Torquay in March 2002.

In January 2003 he had a trial with Southend United, playing in their reserve side.
