= Nicola Kindle =

Liechtenstein alpine skier (born 1991)

Nicola Kindle (born 11 April 1991, in Vaduz) is a Liechtensteiner alpine skier. He competes mainly in Europa Cup events, and finished 33rd in the Super-G at the 2011 FIS Alpine World Ski Championships.
