= Dimitri Gedevanishvili =

Georgian alpine skier (born 1993)

Personal information
- Full name: Dimitri Gedevanishvili
- Nickname: Dima Gedevanishvili
- Born: January 30, 1993 (age 33)
- Height: 1.70 m (5 ft 7 in)

Sport
- Country: Georgia
- Sport: Alpine Skiing
- Event: Giant slalom

Dimitri "Dima" Gedevanishvili (born January 30, 1993) is a Georgian alpine skier. He qualified to represent Georgia at the 2010 Winter Olympics.

He attended Carrabassett Valley Academy. He is the brother of Elene Gedevanishvili.
