= Arni Thorvaldsson =

Icelandic alpine skier (born 1984)

Arni Thorvaldsson (born 5 July 1984) is an alpine skier from Iceland. He competed for Iceland at the 2010 Winter Olympics.

Arni has been member of the Icelandic national team since 2006

He competed for Iceland in FIS Alpine World Ski Championships 2009.
