= Jono Brauer =

Australian alpine skier (born 1981)

Personal information
- Born: 26 September 1981 (age 44) Sydney, Australia

Skiing career
- Country: Australia
- Sport: Alpine skiing
- Disciplines: Slalom, Giant slalom

Olympics
- Teams: 2 (2006–2010)

Jono Brauer (born 26 September 1981 in Sydney) is an Australian alpine skier who specialises in slalom and giant slalom.

Brauer grew up in the Southern Highlands of New South Wales, and as an 8-year-old had already shown an interest in skiing, winning several competitions. When his mother bought a business in the ski resort town of Thredbo, Brauer followed and based his career there.

Brauer won the Australian National Championships several times, and won both European and North American Cup Slalom events as well as a career high 14th in the Chamonix World Cup Super Combined event. He was ranked No. 2 in the world in Slalom for his age of 18. From 2000 to 2010, he was regularly the No. 1 ranked skier in Australia and competitive on the world stage. Unfortunately Brauer suffered a series of season ending injuries resulting in 12 surgeries to his lower limbs and ultimately causing his retirement from the sport in 2010.

Brauer represented Australia in the 2006 Winter Olympics in Turin, Italy, as well as the 2010 Winter Olympics in Vancouver, Canada.

Following his athletic career, Brauer coached for the Australian National team before opening a successful retail business in 2012. He sold this business in 2017 and in 2019, inspired by his two children and love for mountain biking he founded his own brand of Mountain Bike Apparel and Protection focused on kids, Sendy. www.sendygear.com
