= Rok Perko =

Slovenian alpine skier (born 1985)

Personal information
- Born: June 10, 1985 (age 41) Kranj, Yugoslavia

Skiing career
- Sport: Alpine skiing
- Club: KUT - Klub učiteljev in trenerjev TB
- Disciplines: Downhill, Super-G, Combined

Olympics
- Teams: 1 – (10)

World Championships
- Teams: 3 – (2007–11)

World Cup
- Seasons: 9 – (2005–13)
- Podiums: 1

Rok Perko (born June 10, 1985) is a former Slovenian alpine ski racer. He was born in Kranj, and specialized in downhill, super-G and combined.

== Career ==
Perko was a member of the Slovenian ski national team and is a specialist in fast disciplines, downhill and super giant slalom. In the 2004/2005 season, Perko won the title of junior world champion in downhill skiing, and at the same world championship in Bardonecchia, Italy, he also won the title of runner-up in the super giant slalom. In the 2007/2008 season, he became the first Slovene to win 1st place in the overall standings of the European Downhill Cup. In the 2012/2013 season, on December 15, with the 2nd place in the World Cup in Val Gardeni, he achieved one of the successes of his career and is one of the five Slovenians who have ever been on the podium at the World Cup competitions in the downhill discipline. Perko is a two-time participant in the Olympic Games, namely in 2010 in Vancouver, Canada, where he achieved 14th place in the royal downhill discipline, and in 2014 in Sochi, Russia. Perko is also an 8-time national champion in the disciplines of downhill, super giant slalom and giant slalom.

== World Cup results ==
=== Season standings ===
Season	Age	Overall	Slalom	Giant slalom	Super-G	Downhill	Combined
2006	20	144	—	—	—	—	51
2007	21	130	—	—	—	51	—
2008	22	122	—	—	—	50	44
2009	23	98	—	—	49	38	—
2010	24	92	—	—	58	33	—
2011	25	150	—	—	—	56	—
2012	26	110	—	—	41	51	—
2013	27	54	—	—	36	16	—
2014	28	109	—	—	40	47	—

=== Race podiums ===
- 1 podium - (1 DH)

Season	Date	Location	Discipline	Place
2013	15 Dec 2012	Val Gardena, Italy	Downhill	2nd
