= Björn Sieber =

Austrian alpine skier (1989–2012)

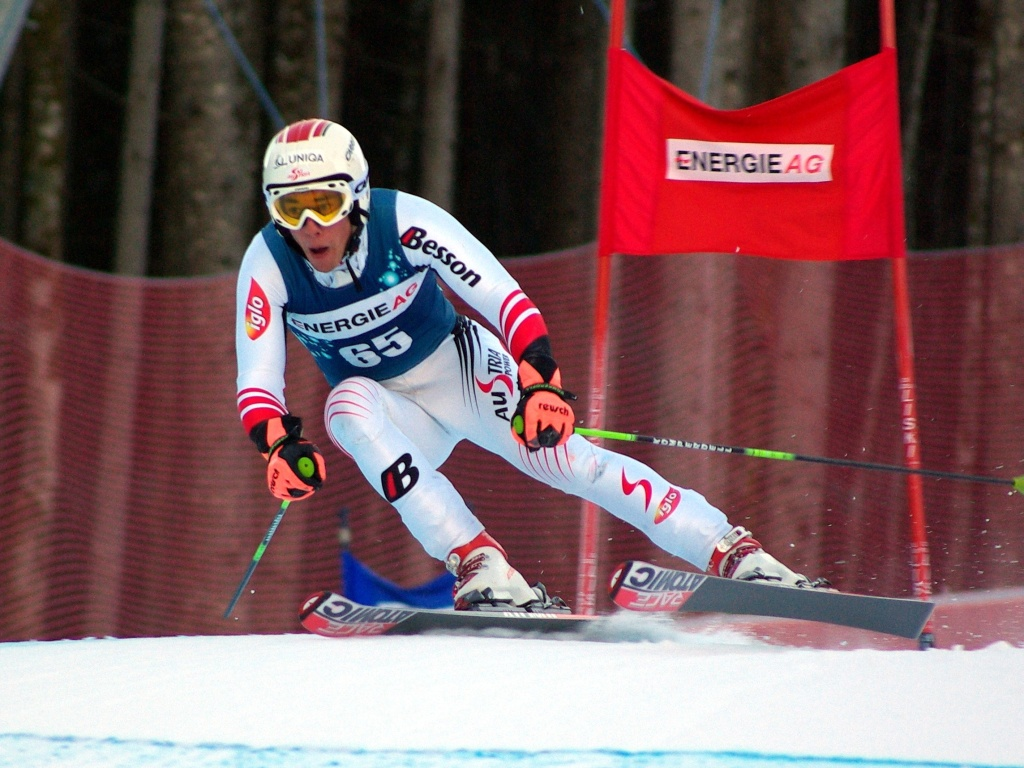
Björn Sieber in January 2008

Björn Sieber (5 March 1989 – 26 October 2012) was an Austrian alpine skier. Sieber won two medals at the World Junior Championships, a silver in giant slalom in 2009, and a bronze in super-G in 2008. His best World Cup result was seventh at a super-combined event in February 2011 in Bansko, Bulgaria. Sieber died in a car crash on 26 October 2012, at the age of 23.

== Biography ==
Sieber competed in his first FIS races in December 2004. His first podium finish followed in a slalom in January 2006, and his first victory came in a giant slalom in March 2009. He made his European Cup debut on January 11, 2008, in the Super-G in Hinterstoder, immediately scoring his first points with a 23rd-place finish. The following month, he won the bronze medal in the Super-G at the World Junior Championships in Formigal, Spain.
