= Robbie Dixon =

Canadian alpine skier (born 1985)

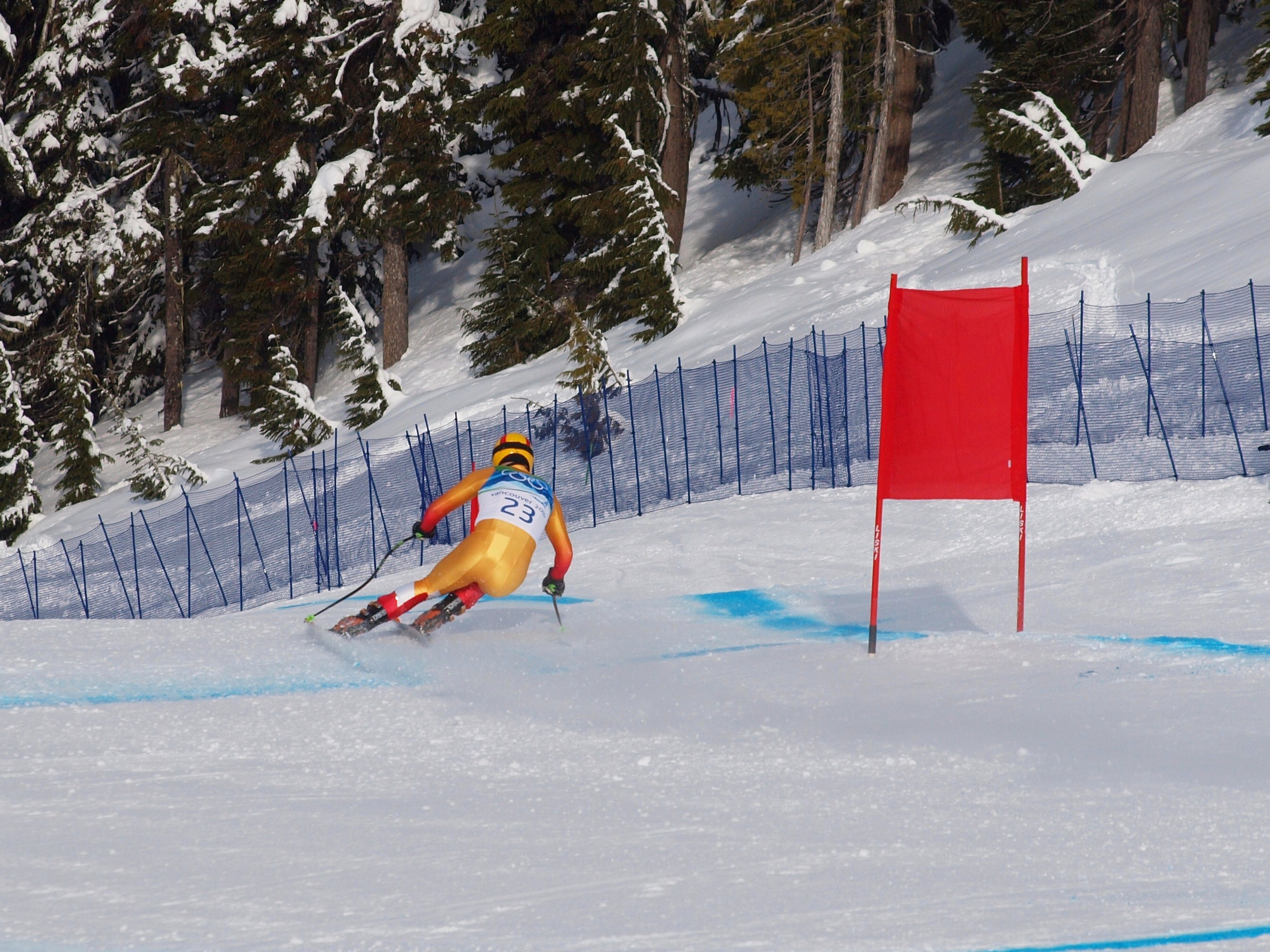

Personal information
- Born: January 4, 1985 (age 41)
- Height: 5 ft 9 in (1.75 m)

Sport
- Sport: Skiing
- Club: Whistler Mountain Ski Club
- Updated on January 29, 2012

Robert 'Robbie' Dixon (born January 4, 1985) is a Canadian alpine skier.

Dixon was born in North Vancouver, British Columbia, Canada. He has been skiing since 2001 in North America, before first skiing World Cup 2006 Lake Louise, Alberta finishing 46th overall best Super G. In March 2008, finished 4th place World Cup Super G Kvitfjell, Norway. best finish next year Kvitfjell finished fifth.

In 2010 Olympic Games, Dixon competed in the downhill, but failed to finish.
