= Edward Drake (skier) =

British alpine skier

Edward "Ed" Drake (born 12 January 1986) is a British former alpine skier and ski cross racer. He started competing internationally at the age of 12 for the British Children's Ski Team. He represented Great Britain at the 2010 Winter Olympics in Vancouver where he took part in the men's downhill, super-G, giant slalom and combined despite partially tearing his anterior cruciate ligament shortly before the Games. Drake is a four-time British champion winning the giant slalom and combined in 2008 and 2009. In 2013 he switched from alpine skiing to ski cross after competing in his first ski cross event, a World Cup competition in Megève, in January of that year when an alpine FIS race he was planning to enter was cancelled. He narrowly missed out on qualifying for the ski cross competition at the 2014 Winter Olympics in Sochi. In May 2016 Drake announced his retirement from racing. Following his retirement Drake turned to broadcasting, commentating on Eurosport's World Cup coverage and becoming a newsreader for 107.8 Radio Jackie.
