= Truls Ove Karlsen =

Norwegian alpine skier (born 1975)

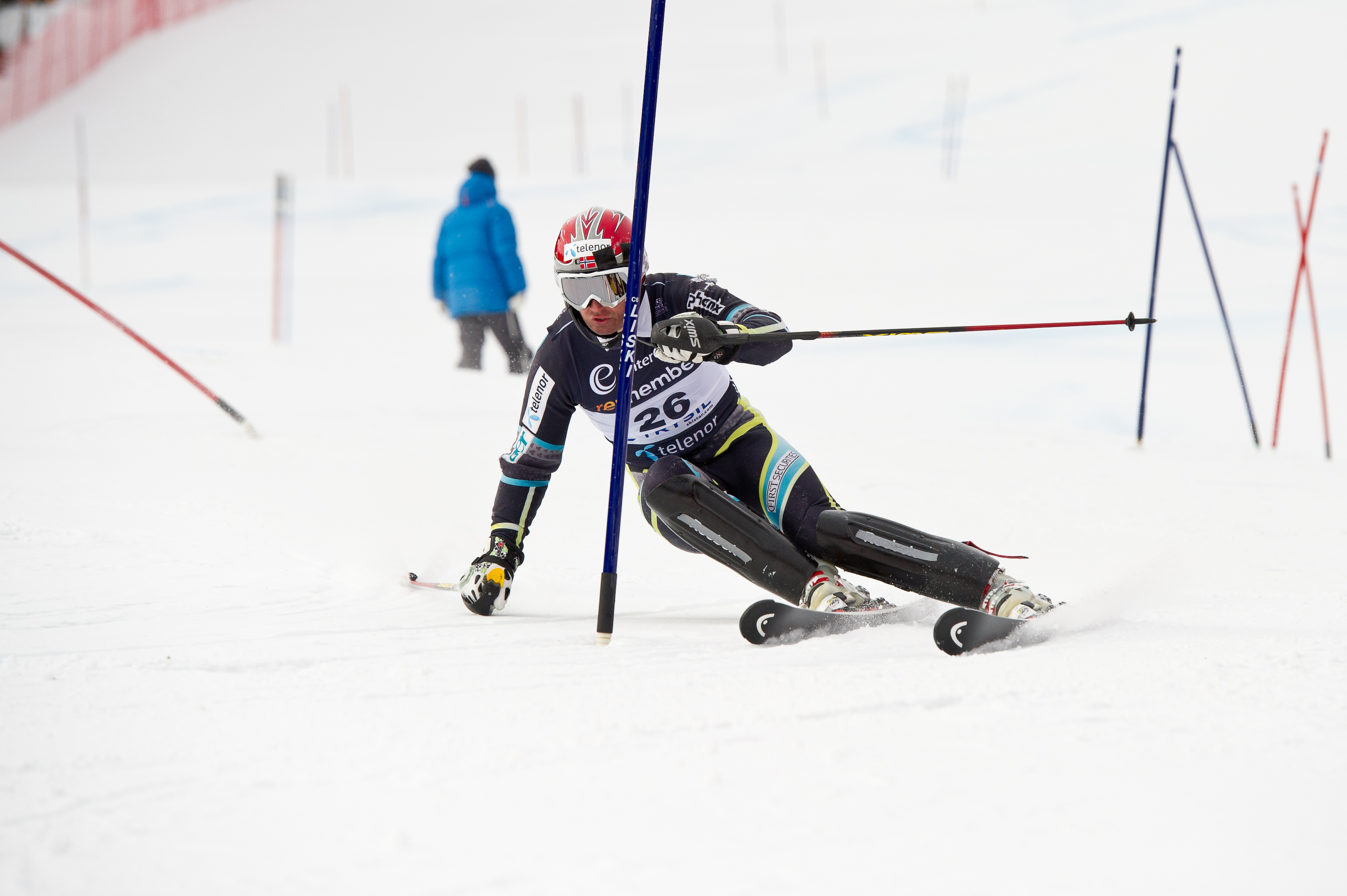
Truls Ove Karlsen

Truls Ove Karlsen (born 25 April 1975 in Oslo) is a retired Norwegian alpine skier. He made his Alpine Skiing World Cup debut in Sölden in 2001. He made a total of 143 World Cup starts, finishing third in a slalom in Sestriere in December 2002 and scoring his only World Cup win in a slalom in Kranjska Gora in February 2004, leading home team-mate Tom Stiansen in a Norwegian one-two ahead of Austrian Mario Matt. His best World Cup seasons were 2003 and 2004, where he finished eighth in the slalom standings. His best results at the Alpine Skiing World Championships were achieved at the 2007 Championships in Åre, where he finished sixth in the giant slalom and seventh in the slalom. He represented Norway at the 2010 Winter Olympics. Karlsen announced his retirement from competition in February 2013. He is now a lawyer at a law firm in his home town Steinkjer. He graduated from the Norwegian University of Science and Technology with a bachelor's degree in History and Psychology in 2004, and has earned a master's degree in law at the University of Oslo in 2018.
