= Tim Cafe =

New Zealand alpine skier (born 1987)

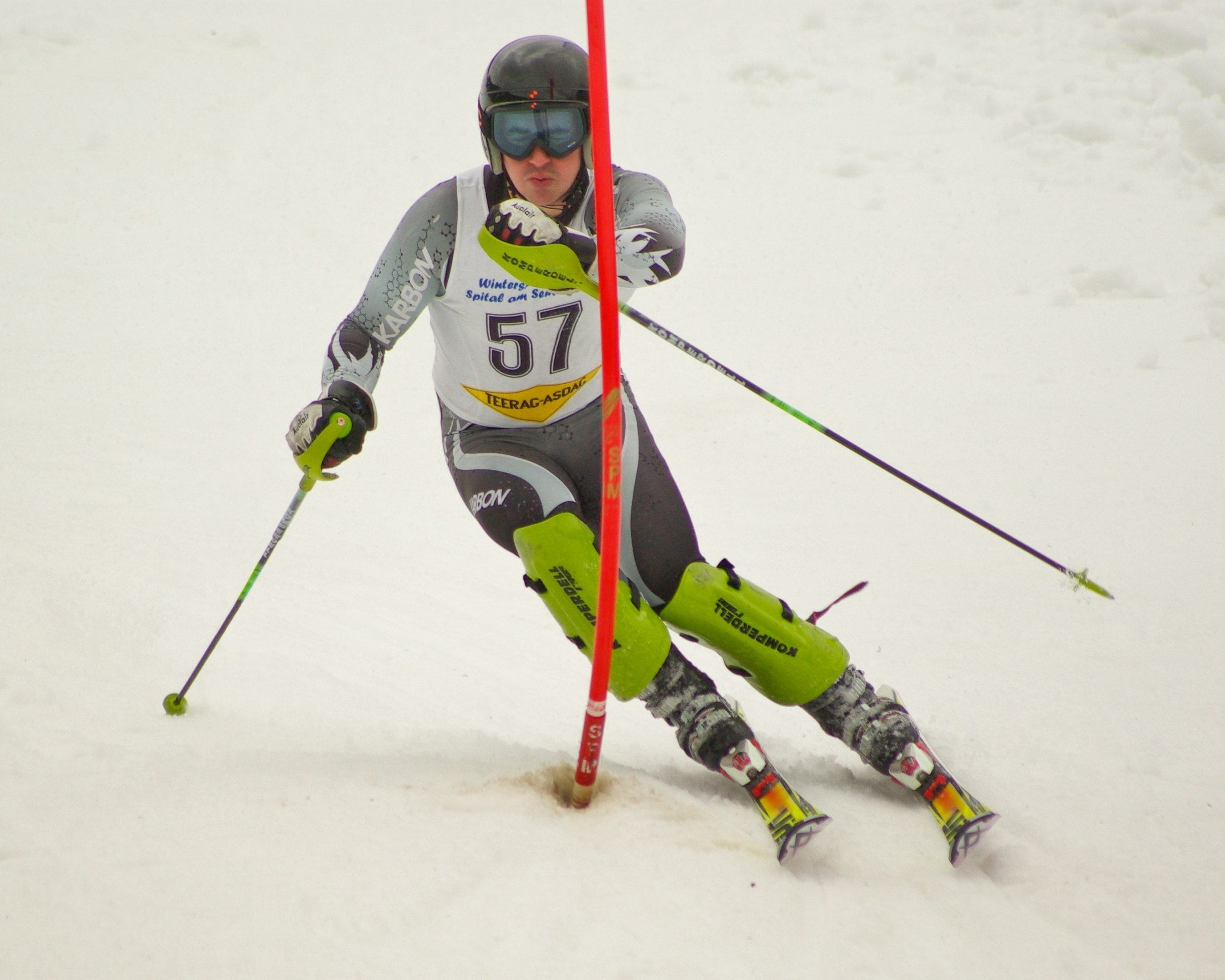
- Tim Cafe during the slalom run of the FIS super combined in Spital am Semmering on 11 March 2008.
- Born: 12 August 1987 (age 38); Invercargill, New Zealand
- Occupation: Alpine skier
- Known for: New Zealand at the 2010 Winter Olympics

Tim Cafe (born 12 August 1987) is an alpine skier from New Zealand. He competed for New Zealand at the 2010 Winter Olympics. He finished in 38th place in the super-G. at Whistler Creekside. This was the best result of any alpine New Zealand skier at the games.

Cafe was brought up in Queenstown, New Zealand. His father Wayne Cafe is a prominent real estate agent in the area. As a result, Cafe learnt to ski on his home hill of Coronet Peak from around three years of age. Career highlights for Cafe include winning Australian & NZ Cup (ANC) super-G and super combined races at Mt Hutt on 10 September 2008, in which he also recorded 26 FIS points. In September 2011 Cafe finished in second place at the ANC finals, earning a career best 20 FIS points, and earning him the FIS yellow bib in super-G.

Tim attended Wakatipu High School in Queenstown and then completed a BCom at Otago University.

As a qualified examiner Tim has worked with the NZSIA and was a member of the NZ Demo Team at InterSki in Argentina in 2015.

Tim is also a qualified coach and has worked with Queenstown Alpine Ski Team, and been the international coach for Queenstowner Alice Robinson for three years. He coached Alice to a GS gold medal in the 2019 Junior World Champs in Italy, which gave her entry to the World Cup finals in Andorra in March 2019, where she won the silver medal in GS.
