= Ferran Terra =

Spanish alpine skier (born 1987)

Ferran Terra (born 10 March 1987) is an alpine skier from Spain. He competed for Spain at the 2010 Winter Olympics where his best result was 27th in the super-G.

== Olympic results ==
Season	Date	Location	Discipline	Place
2010	15 Feb 2010	Vancouver, Canada	Downhill	44th
2010	19 Feb 2010	Vancouver, Canada	Super-G	27th
2010	21 Feb 2010	Vancouver, Canada	Super combined	DNF2
2010	23 Feb 2010	Vancouver, Canada	Giant slalom	DNF1
2014	9 Feb 2014	Sochi, Russia	Downhill	34th
2014	14 Feb 2014	Sochi, Russia	Super combined	25th
2014	16 Feb 2014	Sochi, Russia	Super-G	DSQ
2014	19 Feb 2014	Sochi, Russia	Giant slalom	DNF1
