= Stefan Jon Sigurgeirsson =

Icelandic alpine skier (born 1989)

Stefan Jon Sigurgeirsson (born 19 May 1989) is an alpine skier from Iceland. He competed for Iceland at the 2010 Winter Olympics. His best finish was a 45th place in the super-G.
