= Georgi Georgiev (alpine skier) =

Bulgarian alpine skier (born 1987)

Georgi Georgiev (Bulgarian: Георги Георгиев; born 20 October 1987) is a Bulgarian alpine skier. He competed at the 2014 Winter Olympics in Sochi.
