= Jaroslav Babušiak =

Slovak alpine skier (born 1984)

Medal record

Alpine skiing

Representing Slovakia

Winter Universiade
Silver medal – second place	2009 Harbin	Super-G
Bronze medal – third place	2009 Harbin	Combined

Jaroslav Babušiak (born 6 September 1984 in Kraľovany) is an alpine skier from Slovakia. He competed for Slovakia at the 2010 Winter Olympics. Jaroslav also competed for Slovakia at the 2006 Winter Olympics, where he achieved his best result, a 24th place finish in the slalom.
