= Maciej Bydliński =

Polish alpine skier (born 1988)

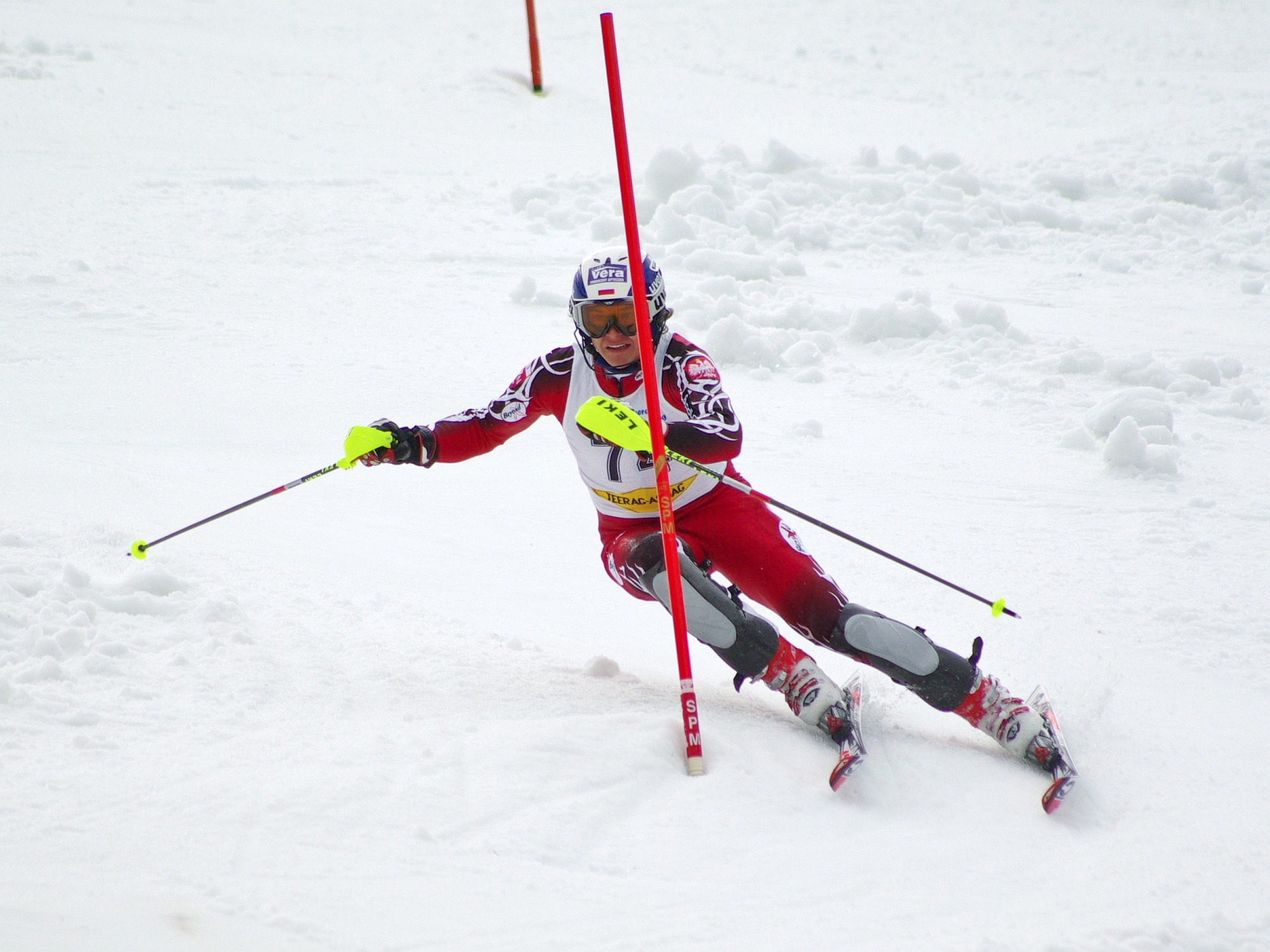
- Maciej Bydliński in 2008

Personal information
- Born: 11 March 1988 (age 38) Szczyrk, Poland

Sport
- Country: Poland
- Sport: Alpine skiing

Maciej Bydliński (born 11 March 1988 in Szczyrk, Poland) is an alpine skier from Poland. He competed for Poland at the 2014 Winter Olympics in the alpine skiing events.
