= FIS Freestyle Ski and Snowboarding World Championships 2017 – Men's ski cross =

The men's ski cross competition of the FIS Freestyle Ski and Snowboarding World Championships 2017 was held at Sierra Nevada, Spain, on March 18 (qualifying and finals). Forty-four athletes from 18 countries competed.

== Results ==
=== Qualification ===
The following are the results of the qualification.

Rank	Bib	Name	Country	Time	Notes
1	7	Jean-Frédéric Chapuis	France	1:04.07	Q
2	1	Jonas Devouassoux	France	1:04.10	Q
3	4	Christopher Delbosco	Canada	1:04.48	Q
4	24	François Place	France	1:04.63	Q
5	10	Marc Bischofberger	Switzerland	1:04.63	Q
6	11	Bastien Midol	France	1:04.64	Q
7	14	Filip Flisar	Slovenia	1:04.69	Q
8	3	Brady Leman	Canada	1:04.73	Q
9	5	Jonas Lenherr	Switzerland	1:04.75	Q
10	19	Johannes Rohrweck	Austria	1:04.77	Q
11	8	Victor Öhling Norberg	Sweden	1:05.00	Q
12	2	David Duncan	Canada	1:05.06	Q
13	25	Jamie Prebble	New Zealand	1:05.17	Q
14	13	Armin Niederer	Switzerland	1:05.19	Q
15	12	Alex Fiva	Switzerland	1:05.24	Q
16	17	Daniel Bohnacker	Germany	1:05.27	Q
17	21	Siegmar Klotz	Italy	1:05.30	Q
18	26	Adam Kappacher	Austria	1:05.34	Q
19	31	Tyler Wallasch	United States	1:05.39	Q
20	15	Kevin Drury	Canada	1:05.39	Q
21	6	Semen Denshchikov	Russia	1:05.47	Q
22	9	Viktor Andersson	Sweden	1:05.50	Q
23	22	Igor Omelin	Russia	1:05.61	Q
24	30	Erik Mobärg	Sweden	1:05.68	Q
25	28	Brant Crossan	United States	1:05.76	Q
26	18	Thomas Zangerl	Austria	1:05.90	Q
27	16	Christoph Wahrstoetter	Austria	1:05.98	Q
28	23	Stefan Thanei	Italy	1:06.05	Q
29	20	Paul Eckert	Germany	1:06.05	Q
30	33	Egor Korotkov	Russia	1:06.17	Q
31	27	Anton Grimus	Austria	1:06.31	Q
32	34	Marco Tomasi	Italy	1:06.54	Q
33	35	Marius Heje Mæhle	Norway	1:06.70	
34	36	Andrea Tonon	Italy	1:06.82	
35	32	Victor Sticko	Sweden	1:07.08	
36	37	Kirill Merenkov	Russia	1:08.05	
37	38	Jiři Čech	Czech Republic	1:08.17	
38	39	Nikola Chongarov	Bulgaria	1:08.38	
39	41	Vladimir Popov	Bulgaria	1:08.66	
40	44	Koppany Pap	Hungary	1:08.99	
41	42	Stoyan Varbanov	Bulgaria	1:09.25	
42	43	Tomas Bartalský	Slovakia	1:09.73	
43	40	Davit Tediashvili	Georgia	1:10.47	
	29	Florian Wilmsmann	Germany	DNF	

=== Elimination round ===
The following are the results of the elimination round.

==== 1/8 round ====
The top 32 qualifiers advanced to the 1/8 round. From here, they participated in four-person elimination races, with the top two from each race advancing.

Heat 1

Rank	Bib	Name	Country	Notes
1	16	Daniel Bohnacker	Germany	Q
2	17	Siegmar Klotz	Italy	Q
3	32	Marco Tomasi	Italy	
4	1	Jean-Frédéric Chapuis	France	

Heat 3

Rank	Bib	Name	Country	Notes
1	21	Semen Denshchikov	Russia	Q
2	5	Marc Bischofberger	Switzerland	Q
3	28	Stefan Thanei	Italy	
4	12	David Duncan	Canada	

Heat 5

Rank	Bib	Name	Country	Notes
1	19	Tyler Wallasch	United States	Q
2	3	Christopher Delbosco	Canada	Q
3	14	Armin Niederer	Switzerland	
4	30	Egor Korotkov	Russia	

Heat 7

Rank	Bib	Name	Country	Notes
1	7	Filip Flisar	Slovenia	Q
2	23	Igor Omelin	Russia	Q
3	10	Johannes Rohrweck	Austria	
4	26	Thomas Zangerl	Austria	

Heat 2

Rank	Bib	Name	Country	Notes
1	25	Brant Crossan	United States	Q
2	8	Brady Leman	Canada	Q
3	9	Jonas Lenherr	Switzerland	
4	24	Erik Mobärg	Sweden	

Heat 4

Rank	Bib	Name	Country	Notes
1	4	François Place	France	Q
2	13	Jamie Prebble	New Zealand	Q
3	29	Paul Eckert	Germany	
4	20	Kevin Drury	Canada	

Heat 6

Rank	Bib	Name	Country	Notes
1	27	Christoph Wahrstoetter	Austria	Q
2	11	Victor Öhling Norberg	Sweden	Q
3	6	Bastien Midol	France	
	22	Viktor Andersson	Sweden	DNF

Heat 8

Rank	Bib	Name	Country	Notes
1	2	Jonas Devouassoux	France	Q
2	18	Adam Kappacher	Austria	Q
3	15	Alex Fiva	Switzerland	
4	31	Anton Grimus	Austria	

==== Quarterfinals round ====
Heat 1

Rank	Bib	Name	Country	Notes
1	17	Siegmar Klotz	Italy	Q
2	8	Brady Leman	Canada	Q
3	25	Brant Crossan	United States	
4	16	Daniel Bohnacker	Germany	

Heat 3

Rank	Bib	Name	Country	Notes
1	11	Victor Öhling Norberg	Sweden	Q
2	27	Christoph Wahrstoetter	Austria	Q
3	3	Christopher Delbosco	Canada	
4	19	Tyler Wallasch	United States	

Heat 2

Rank	Bib	Name	Country	Notes
1	4	François Place	France	Q
2	13	Jamie Prebble	New Zealand	Q
3	5	Marc Bischofberger	Switzerland	
4	21	Semen Denshchikov	Russia	

Heat 4

Rank	Bib	Name	Country	Notes
1	7	Filip Flisar	Slovenia	Q
2	18	Adam Kappacher	Austria	Q
3	23	Igor Omelin	Russia	
	2	Jonas Devouassoux	France	DNF

==== Semifinals round ====
Heat 1

Rank	Bib	Name	Country	Notes
1	13	Jamie Prebble	New Zealand	Q
2	4	François Place	France	Q
3	17	Siegmar Klotz	Italy	
4	8	Brady Leman	Canada	

Heat 2

Rank	Bib	Name	Country	Notes
1	7	Filip Flisar	Slovenia	Q
2	11	Victor Öhling Norberg	Sweden	Q
3	27	Christoph Wahrstoetter	Austria	
4	18	Adam Kappacher	Austria	

==== Final round ====
Small final

Rank	Bib	Name	Country	Notes
5	27	Christoph Wahrstoetter	Austria	
6	18	Adam Kappacher	Austria	
7	8	Brady Leman	Canada	
8	17	Siegmar Klotz	Italy	DNF

Final

Rank	Bib	Name	Country	Notes
1st place, gold medalist(s)	11	Victor Öhling Norberg	Sweden	
2nd place, silver medalist(s)	13	Jamie Prebble	New Zealand	
3rd place, bronze medalist(s)	4	François Place	France	DNF
4	7	Filip Flisar	Slovenia	DNF
