= Freestyle skiing at the 2018 Winter Olympics – Men's ski cross =

Men's ski cross at the XXIII Olympic Winter Games
- Venue: Bogwang Phoenix Park, Pyeongchang, South Korea
- Dates: 21 February
- Competitors: 31 from 11 nations

Medalists
1st place, gold medalist(s)		Brady Leman	Canada
2nd place, silver medalist(s)		Marc Bischofberger	Switzerland
3rd place, bronze medalist(s)		Sergey Ridzik	Olympic Athletes from Russia

The men's ski cross event in freestyle skiing at the 2018 Winter Olympics took place on 21 February 2018 at the Bogwang Phoenix Park, Pyeongchang, South Korea.

== Qualification ==
The top 32 athletes in the Olympic quota allocation list qualified, with a maximum of four athletes per National Olympic Committee (NOC) allowed. All athletes qualifying must also have placed in the top 30 of a FIS World Cup event or the FIS Freestyle Ski and Snowboarding World Championships 2017 during the qualification period (1 July 2016 to 21 January 2018) and also have a minimum of 80 FIS points to compete. If the host country, South Korea at the 2018 Winter Olympics did not qualify, their chosen athlete would displace the last qualified athlete, granted all qualification criterion was met.

== Results ==
=== Seeding ===
The seeding round was held at 11:30.

Rank	Bib	Name	Country	Time	Difference
1	9	Alex Fiva	Switzerland	1:08.74	−
2	10	Sergey Ridzik	Olympic Athletes from Russia	1:09.21	+0.47
3	16	Kevin Drury	Canada	1:09.41	+0.67
4	2	Armin Niederer	Switzerland	1:09.46	+0.72
5	14	Filip Flisar	Slovenia	1:09.65	+0.91
6	8	Christoph Wahrstötter	Austria	1:09.79	+1.05
7	15	Jean-Frédéric Chapuis	France	1:09.84	+1.10
8	6	Brady Leman	Canada	1:09.94	+1.20
9	11	Marc Bischofberger	Switzerland	1:09.99	+1.25
10	7	Paul Eckert	Germany	1:10.06	+1.32
11	28	Robert Winkler	Austria	1:10.09	+1.35
12	29	Stefan Thanei	Italy	1:10.10	+1.36
13	19	Jonas Lenherr	Switzerland	1:10.12	+1.38
14	1	Arnaud Bovolenta	France	1:10.12	+1.38
15	26	Siegmar Klotz	Italy	1:10.15	+1.41
16	20	Adam Kappacher	Austria	1:10.17	+1.43
17	24	Igor Omelin	Olympic Athletes from Russia	1:10.24	+1.50
18	13	François Place	France	1:10.26	+1.52
19	3	Victor Öhling Norberg	Sweden	1:10.26	+1.52
20	17	Tim Hronek	Germany	1:10.27	+1.53
21	27	Florian Wilmsmann	Germany	1:10.33	+1.59
22	23	Erik Mobärg	Sweden	1:10.36	+1.62
23	25	Egor Korotkov	Olympic Athletes from Russia	1:10.39	+1.65
24	4	Terence Tchiknavorian	France	1:10.41	+1.67
25	21	Jamie Prebble	New Zealand	1:10.48	+1.74
26	22	David Duncan	Canada	1:10.51	+1.77
27	30	Semen Denshchikov	Olympic Athletes from Russia	1:10.86	+2.12
28	12	Thomas Zangerl	Austria	1:10.96	+2.22
29	5	Viktor Andersson	Sweden	1:11.20	+2.46
30	31	Anton Grimus	Australia	1:40.80	+32.06
31	18	Christopher Del Bosco	Canada	1:48.25	+39.51

=== Elimination round ===
A knockout stage was held to determine the winner.

==== 1/8 finals ====
Heat 1

Rank	Bib	Name	Country	Notes
1	1	Alex Fiva	Switzerland	Q
2	16	Adam Kappacher	Austria	Q
3	17	Igor Omelin	Olympic Athletes from Russia	

Heat 2

Rank	Bib	Name	Country	Notes
1	9	Marc Bischofberger	Switzerland	Q
2	8	Brady Leman	Canada	Q
3	25	Jamie Prebble	New Zealand	
	24	Terence Tchiknavorian	France	DNF

Heat 3

Rank	Bib	Name	Country	Notes
1	5	Filip Flisar	Slovenia	Q
2	28	Thomas Zangerl	Austria	Q
3	12	Stefan Thanei	Italy	
4	21	Florian Wilmsmann	Germany	

Heat 4

Rank	Bib	Name	Country	Notes
1	4	Armin Niederer	Switzerland	Q
2	13	Jonas Lenherr	Switzerland	Q
3	20	Tim Hronek	Germany	
4	29	Viktor Andersson	Sweden	

Heat 5

Rank	Bib	Name	Country	Notes
1	3	Kevin Drury	Canada	Q
2	14	Arnaud Bovolenta	France	Q
3	19	Victor Öhling Norberg	Sweden	
4	30	Anton Grimus	Australia	

Heat 6

Rank	Bib	Name	Country	Notes
1	11	Robert Winkler	Austria	Q
2	27	Semen Denshchikov	Olympic Athletes from Russia	Q
	6	Christoph Wahrstötter	Austria	DNF
	22	Erik Mobärg	Sweden	DNF

Heat 7

Rank	Bib	Name	Country	Notes
1	26	David Duncan	Canada	Q
2	7	Jean-Frédéric Chapuis	France	Q
3	10	Paul Eckert	Germany	
4	23	Egor Korotkov	Olympic Athletes from Russia	

Heat 8

Rank	Bib	Name	Country	Notes
1	18	François Place	France	Q
2	2	Sergey Ridzik	Olympic Athletes from Russia	Q
3	15	Siegmar Klotz	Italy	
	31	Christopher Del Bosco	Canada	DNF

==== Quarterfinals ====
Heat 1

Rank	Bib	Name	Country	Notes
1	8	Brady Leman	Canada	Q
2	9	Marc Bischofberger	Switzerland	Q
	1	Alex Fiva	Switzerland	DNF
	16	Adam Kappacher	Austria	DNF

Heat 2

Rank	Bib	Name	Country	Notes
1	4	Armin Niederer	Switzerland	Q
2	5	Filip Flisar	Slovenia	Q
3	28	Thomas Zangerl	Austria	
4	13	Jonas Lenherr	Switzerland	

Heat 3

Rank	Bib	Name	Country	Notes
1	3	Kevin Drury	Canada	Q
2	14	Arnaud Bovolenta	France	Q
3	27	Semen Denshchikov	Olympic Athletes from Russia	
	11	Robert Winkler	Austria	DNF

Heat 4

Rank	Bib	Name	Country	Notes
1	2	Sergey Ridzik	Olympic Athletes from Russia	Q
2	26	David Duncan	Canada	Q
3	18	François Place	France	
4	7	Jean-Frédéric Chapuis	France	

==== Semifinals ====
Heat 1

Rank	Bib	Name	Country	Notes
1	8	Brady Leman	Canada	BF
2	9	Marc Bischofberger	Switzerland	BF
3	4	Armin Niederer	Switzerland	SF
4	5	Filip Flisar	Slovenia	SF

Heat 2

Rank	Bib	Name	Country	Notes
1	3	Kevin Drury	Canada	BF
2	2	Sergey Ridzik	Olympic Athletes from Russia	BF
3	14	Arnaud Bovolenta	France	SF
4	26	David Duncan	Canada	SF

==== Finals ====
Small final

Rank	Bib	Name	Country	Notes
5	4	Armin Niederer	Switzerland	
6	14	Arnaud Bovolenta	France	
7	5	Filip Flisar	Slovenia	
8	26	David Duncan	Canada	

Big final

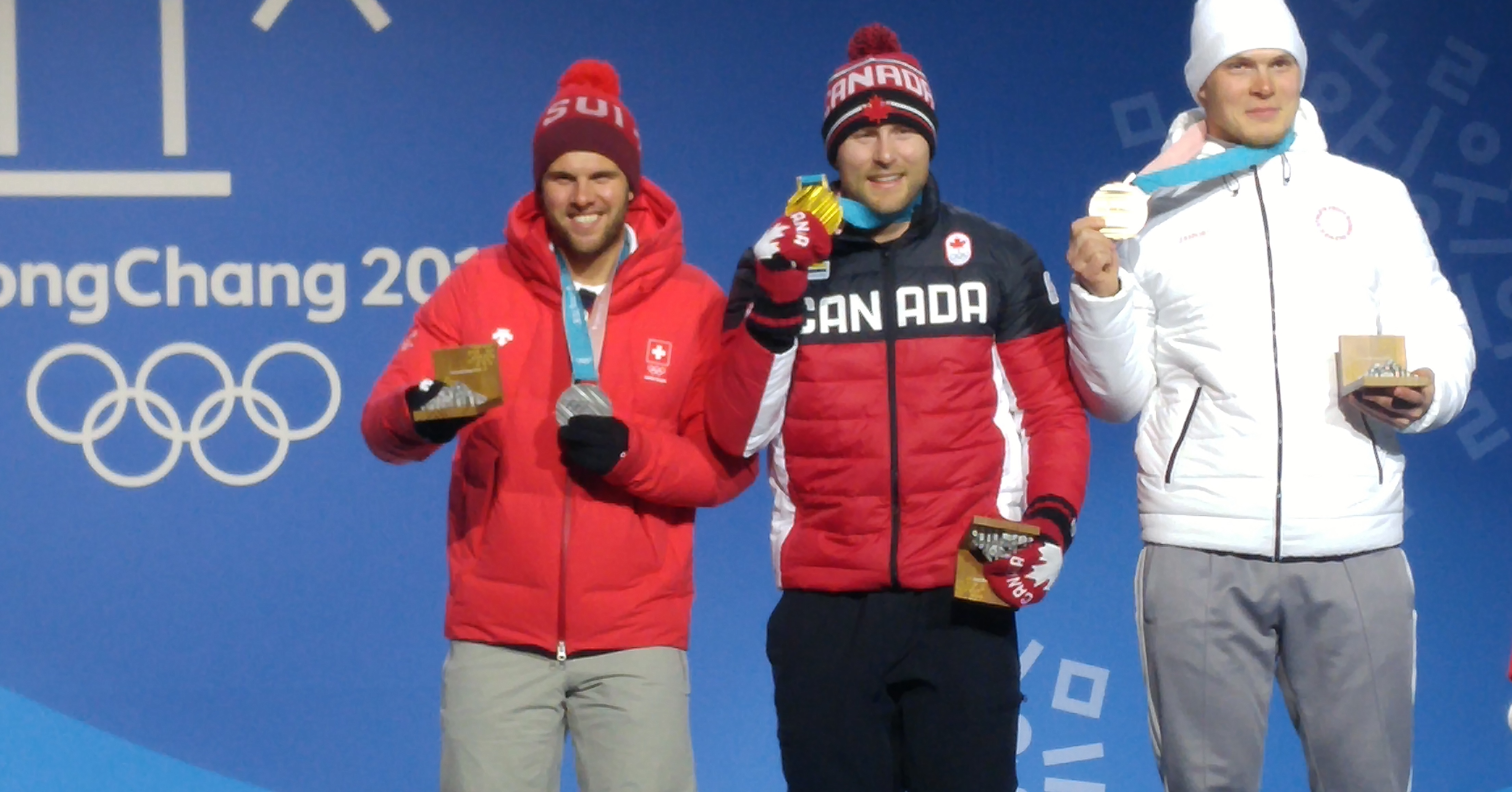
The podium

Rank	Bib	Name	Country	Notes
1st place, gold medalist(s)	8	Brady Leman	Canada	
2nd place, silver medalist(s)	9	Marc Bischofberger	Switzerland	
3rd place, bronze medalist(s)	2	Sergey Ridzik	Olympic Athletes from Russia	
4	3	Kevin Drury	Canada	DNF
