= FIS Alpine World Ski Championships 2013 – Men's super-G =

Men's super-G at the FIS Alpine World Ski Championships 2013
- Venue: Planai; Schladming, Austria
- Date: 6 February 2013
- Competitors: 82 from 32 nations
- Winning time: 1:23.96

Medalists
| gold medal | Ted Ligety | United States |
| silver medal | Gauthier de Tessières | France |
| bronze medal | Aksel Lund Svindal | Norway |

The men's super-G competition at the 2013 World Championships was held on Wednesday, 6 February. It was the first men's race of the championships; 82 athletes from 32 countries competed.

Ted Ligety won the world title, his first-ever victory in a super-G race in international competition. A top competitor in giant slalom, his only previous podium in super-G was a runner-up finish at a World Cup race at Val-d'Isère in December 2009. Completing the podium were Gauthier de Tessières, a late replacement, and Aksel Lund Svindal.

Kjetil Jansrud crashed and tore a ligament in his left knee, ending his 2013 season.

== Results ==
The race was started on schedule at 11:00.

| Rank | Bib | Name | Country | Time | Difference |
|---|---|---|---|---|---|
| 1st place, gold medalist(s) | 10 | Ted Ligety | United States | 1:23.96 | |
| 2nd place, silver medalist(s) | 4 | Gauthier de Tessières | France | 1:24.16 | +0.20 |
| 3rd place, bronze medalist(s) | 22 | Aksel Lund Svindal | Norway | 1:24.18 | +0.22 |
| 4 | 19 | Hannes Reichelt | Austria | 1:24.51 | +0.55 |
| 5 | 16 | Matthias Mayer | Austria | 1:24.91 | +0.95 |
| 6 | 1 | Alexis Pinturault | France | 1:24.99 | +1.03 |
| 7 | 20 | Christof Innerhofer | Italy | 1:25.05 | +1.09 |
| 8 | 13 | Romed Baumann | Austria | 1:25.17 | +1.21 |
| 9 | 21 | Adrien Théaux | France | 1:25.21 | +1.25 |
| 10 | 12 | Georg Streitberger | Austria | 1:25.30 | +1.34 |
| 11 | 17 | Matteo Marsaglia | Italy | 1:25.35 | +1.39 |
| 12 | 14 | Jan Hudec | Canada | 1:25.52 | +1.56 |
| 13 | 6 | Thomas Biesemeyer | United States | 1:25.56 | +1.60 |
| 14 | 9 | Peter Fill | Italy | 1:25.60 | +1.64 |
| 15 | 25 | Ryan Cochran-Siegle | United States | 1:25.63 | +1.67 |
| 16 | 28 | Manuel Osborne-Paradis | Canada | 1:25.74 | +1.78 |
| 17 | 8 | Andreas Romar | Finland | 1:25.75 | +1.79 |
| 18 | 27 | Patrick Küng | Switzerland | 1:25.88 | +1.92 |
| 19 | 32 | Benjamin Thomsen | Canada | 1:25.93 | +1.97 |
| 20 | 11 | Werner Heel | Italy | 1:26.00 | +2.04 |
| 21 | 7 | Thomas Mermillod-Blondin | France | 1:26.11 | +2.15 |
| 22 | 23 | Siegmar Klotz | Italy | 1:26.27 | +2.31 |
| 23 | 15 | Erik Guay | Canada | 1:26.30 | +2.34 |
| 24 | 36 | Tobias Stechert | Germany | 1:26.64 | +2.68 |
| 25 | 26 | Carlo Janka | Switzerland | 1:26.73 | +2.77 |
| 26 | 29 | Didier Défago | Switzerland | 1:26.81 | +2.85 |
| 27 | 35 | Klemen Kosi | Slovenia | 1:26.83 | +2.87 |
| 28 | 24 | Ivica Kostelić | Croatia | 1:26.89 | +2.93 |
| 29 | 46 | Marcus Sandell | Finland | 1:27.01 | +3.05 |
| 30 | 31 | Boštjan Kline | Slovenia | 1:27.02 | +3.06 |
| 31 | 33 | Andrej Šporn | Slovenia | 1:27.04 | +3.08 |
| 32 | 39 | Matts Olsson | Sweden | 1:27.26 | +3.30 |
| 33 | 3 | Stephan Keppler | Germany | 1:27.55 | +3.59 |
| 34 | 38 | Douglas Hedin | Sweden | 1:27.60 | +3.64 |
| 35 | 30 | Rok Perko | Slovenia | 1:27.78 | +3.82 |
| 36 | 64 | Adam Žampa | Slovakia | 1:27.94 | +3.98 |
| 37 | 37 | Paul de la Cuesta | Spain | 1:28.48 | +4.52 |
| 38 | 49 | Nikola Chongarov | Bulgaria | 1:28.61 | +4.65 |
| 39 | 45 | Benjamin Griffin | New Zealand | 1:28.72 | +4.76 |
| 40 | 44 | Maciej Bydlinski | Poland | 1:28.93 | +4.97 |
| 41 | 55 | Martin Vráblík | Czech Republic | 1:29.30 | +5.34 |
| 42 | 53 | Nick Prebble | New Zealand | 1:29.35 | +5.39 |
| 43 | 77 | Jorge Birkner Ketelhohn | Argentina | 1:29.99 | +6.03 |
| 44 | 58 | Max Ullrich | Croatia | 1:30.02 | +6.06 |
| 45 | 43 | Kevin Esteve | Andorra | 1:30.20 | +6.24 |
| 46 | 56 | Svetoslav Georgiev | Bulgaria | 1:30.23 | +6.27 |
| 47 | 52 | Martin Khuber | Kazakhstan | 1:30.32 | +6.36 |
| 48 | 70 | Igor Laikert | Bosnia and Herzegovina | 1:30.66 | +6.70 |
| 49 | 67 | Michal Klusak | Poland | 1:30.82 | +6.86 |
| 50 | 74 | Matej Falat | Slovakia | 1:30.85 | +6.89 |
| 51 | 51 | Sebastian Brigović | Croatia | 1:31.00 | +7.04 |
| 52 | 57 | Georgi Georgiev | Bulgaria | 1:31.06 | +7.10 |
| 53 | 71 | Yuri Danilochkin | Belarus | 1:31.08 | +7.12 |
| 54 | 73 | Igor Zakurdaev | Kazakhstan | 1:31.32 | +7.36 |
| 55 | 75 | Sam Robertson | Australia | 1:31.77 | +7.81 |
| 56 | 50 | Christoffer Faarup | Denmark | 1:31.90 | +7.94 |
| 57 | 62 | Cristian Javier Simari Birkner | Argentina | 1:32.02 | +8.06 |
| 58 | 76 | Taras Pimenov | Kazakhstan | 1:32.05 | +8.09 |
| 59 | 61 | Steffan Winkelhorst | Netherlands | 1:32.14 | +8.18 |
| 60 | 81 | Rostyslav Feshchuk | Ukraine | 1:32.76 | +8.80 |
| 61 | 66 | Jackson Coull | Australia | 1:33.08 | +9.12 |
| 62 | 68 | Istok Rodeš | Croatia | 1:33.23 | +9.27 |
| 63 | 63 | Jamie Prebble | New Zealand | 1:33.76 | +9.80 |
| 64 | 72 | Roberts Rode | Latvia | 1:34.35 | +10.39 |
| 65 | 80 | Ivan Kovbasnyuk | Ukraine | 1:35.98 | +12.02 |
| 66 | 78 | Stephan Sumps | Chile | 1:38.42 | +14.46 |
| | 5 | Andrew Weibrecht | United States | DNF | |
| | 18 | Kjetil Jansrud | Norway | DNF | |
| | 34 | Aleksandr Glebov | Russia | DNF | |
| | 40 | Ivan Muravyev | Russia | DNF | |
| | 41 | Arjan Wanders | Netherlands | DNF | |
| | 42 | Marvin van Heek | Netherlands | DNF | |
| | 47 | Ferran Terra | Spain | DNF | |
| | 48 | Maarten Meiners | Netherlands | DNF | |
| | 54 | Willis Feasey | New Zealand | DNF | |
| | 59 | Georg Lindner | Moldova | DNF | |
| | 60 | Marc Oliveras | Andorra | DNF | |
| | 65 | Dmitriy Koshkin | Kazakhstan | DNF | |
| | 79 | Ignacio Freeman Crespo | Argentina | DNF | |
| DQ | 2 | Silvan Zurbriggen | Switzerland | 1:25.32 | +1.36 |
| DQ | 69 | Ondrej Berndt | Czech Republic | 1:31.30 | +7.34 |
| DQ | 82 | Marton Kekesi | Hungary | 1:43.25 | +19.29 |

== Video ==
- YouTube.com – Ligety's gold medal run
- YouTube.com – Tessières' silver medal run
- YouTube.com – Svindal's bronze medal run
