= FIS Freestyle Ski and Snowboarding World Championships 2019 – Men's ski cross =

Men's ski cross at the FIS Freestyle Ski and Snowboarding World Championships 2019
- Venue: Solitude Mountain Resort
- Location: Utah, United States
- Dates: February 1–2
- Competitors: 36 from 15 nations

Medalists
gold medal	François Place	France
silver medal	Brady Leman	Canada
bronze medal	Kevin Drury	Canada

The Men's ski cross competition at the FIS Freestyle Ski and Snowboarding World Championships 2019 was held on February 1 and 2, 2019.

== Qualification ==
The qualification was held on February 1 at 14:30.

Rank	Bib	Name	Country	Time	Notes
1	11	Bastien Midol	France	58.66	Q
2	17	François Place	France	59.07	Q
3	16	Jean-Frédéric Chapuis	France	59.16	Q
4	3	Brady Leman	Canada	59.16	Q
5	21	Reece Howden	Canada	59.20	Q
6	13	Johannes Aujesky	Austria	59.21	Q
7	6	Kevin Drury	Canada	59.38	Q
8	12	Alex Fiva	Switzerland	59.43	Q
9	1	Daniel Traxler	Austria	59.46	Q
10	2	Johannes Rohrweck	Austria	59.54	Q
11	24	David Mobärg	Sweden	59.57	Q
12	20	Florian Wilmsmann	Germany	59.65	Q
13	22	Filip Flisar	Slovenia	59.68	Q
14	10	Paul Eckert	Germany	59.73	Q
15	5	Victor Öhling Norberg	Sweden	59.75	Q
16	19	Christopher Del Bosco	Canada	59.77	Q
17	4	Viktor Andersson	Sweden	59.91	Q
18	8	Jonas Lenherr	Switzerland	59.93	Q
19	18	Adam Kappacher	Austria	59.94	Q
20	23	Daniel Bohnacker	Germany	1:00.08	Q
21	7	Marc Bischofberger	Switzerland	1:00.16	Q
22	26	Tim Hronek	Germany	1:00.18	Q
23	15	Jonathan Midol	France	1:00.19	Q
24	14	Joos Berry	Switzerland	1:00.33	Q
25	25	Tyler Wallasch	United States	1:00.34	Q
26	27	Igor Omelin	Russia	1:00.50	Q
27	29	Maxim Vikhrov	Russia	1:00.82	Q
28	31	Henrik Lunde	Norway	1:00.96	Q
29	28	Oliver Davies	Great Britain	1:00.97	Q
30	36	Simone Deromedis	Italy	1:01.15	Q
31	34	Edoardo Zorzi	Italy	1:01.27	Q
32	30	Pavel Kolgotin	Russia	1:01.61	Q
33	33	Tomáš Bartalský	Slovakia	1:01.78	
34	32	Nikola Chongarov	Bulgaria	1:01.93	
35	35	Koppány Pap	Hungary	1:02.53	
36	9	Sergey Ridzik	Russia	1:08.56	

== Elimination round ==
The top 32 qualifiers advanced to the 1/8 finals. From here, they participated in four-person elimination races, with the top two from each race advancing.

=== 1/8 finals ===
Heat 1

Rank	Bib	Name	Country	Notes
1	1	Bastien Midol	France	Q
2	17	Viktor Andersson	Sweden	Q
3	16	Christopher Del Bosco	Canada	
4	32	Pavel Kolgotin	Russia	

Heat 3

Rank	Bib	Name	Country	Notes
1	21	Marc Bischofberger	Switzerland	Q
2	12	Florian Wilmsmann	Germany	Q
3	5	Reece Howden	Canada	
4	28	Henrik Lunde	Norway	

Heat 5

Rank	Bib	Name	Country	Notes
1	3	Jean-Frédéric Chapuis	France	Q
2	19	Adam Kappacher	Austria	Q
3	14	Paul Eckert	Germany	
4	30	Simone Deromedis	Italy	

Heat 7

Rank	Bib	Name	Country	Notes
1	7	Kevin Drury	Canada	Q
2	10	Johannes Rohrweck	Austria	Q
3	23	Jonathan Midol	France	
4	26	Igor Omelin	Russia	

Heat 2

Rank	Bib	Name	Country	Notes
1	8	Alex Fiva	Switzerland	Q
2	25	Tyler Wallasch	United States	Q
3	24	Joos Berry	Switzerland	
4	9	Daniel Traxler	Austria	

Heat 4

Rank	Bib	Name	Country	Notes
1	4	Brady Leman	Canada	Q
2	13	Filip Flisar	Slovenia	Q
3	20	Daniel Bohnacker	Germany	
4	29	Oliver Davies	Great Britain	

Heat 6

Rank	Bib	Name	Country	Notes
1	6	Johannes Aujesky	Austria	Q
2	11	David Mobärg	Sweden	Q
3	27	Maxim Vikhrov	Russia	
4	22	Tim Hronek	Germany	

Heat 8

Rank	Bib	Name	Country	Notes
1	2	François Place	France	Q
2	18	Jonas Lenherr	Switzerland	Q
3	15	Victor Öhling Norberg	Sweden	
4	31	Edoardo Zorzi	Italy	

=== Quarterfinals ===
Heat 1

Rank	Bib	Name	Country	Notes
1	17	Viktor Andersson	Sweden	Q
2	8	Alex Fiva	Switzerland	Q
3	1	Bastien Midol	France	
4	25	Tyler Wallasch	United States	

Heat 3

Rank	Bib	Name	Country	Notes
1	3	Jean-Frédéric Chapuis	France	Q
2	6	Johannes Aujesky	Austria	Q
3	11	David Mobärg	Sweden	
4	19	Adam Kappacher	Austria	

Heat 2

Rank	Bib	Name	Country	Notes
1	13	Filip Flisar	Slovenia	Q
2	4	Brady Leman	Canada	Q
3	12	Florian Wilmsmann	Germany	
—	21	Marc Bischofberger	Switzerland	DNF

Heat 4

Rank	Bib	Name	Country	Notes
1	2	François Place	France	Q
2	7	Kevin Drury	Canada	Q
3	18	Jonas Lenherr	Switzerland	
4	10	Johannes Rohrweck	Austria	

=== Semifinals ===
Heat 1

Rank	Bib	Name	Country	Notes
1	4	Brady Leman	Canada	Q
2	8	Alex Fiva	Switzerland	Q
3	13	Filip Flisar	Slovenia	
4	17	Viktor Andersson	Sweden	

Heat 2

Rank	Bib	Name	Country	Notes
1	7	Kevin Drury	Canada	Q
2	2	François Place	France	Q
3	3	Jean-Frédéric Chapuis	France	
4	6	Johannes Aujesky	Austria	

=== Finals ===
==== Small final ====
Rank	Bib	Name	Country	Notes
5	3	Jean-Frédéric Chapuis	France	
6	6	Johannes Aujesky	Austria	
7	17	Viktor Andersson	Sweden	
8	13	Filip Flisar	Slovenia	

==== Big final ====
Rank	Bib	Name	Country	Notes
1st place, gold medalist(s)	2	François Place	France	
2nd place, silver medalist(s)	4	Brady Leman	Canada	
3rd place, bronze medalist(s)	7	Kevin Drury	Canada	
4	8	Alex Fiva	Switzerland	
