= FIS Alpine World Ski Championships 2013 – Men's downhill =

Men's downhill at the FIS Alpine World Ski Championships 2013
- Venue: Planai; Schladming, Austria
- Date: 9 February 2013
- Competitors: 58 from 27 nations
- Winning time: 2:01.32

Medalists
gold medal	Aksel Lund Svindal	Norway
silver medal	Dominik Paris	Italy
bronze medal	David Poisson	France

Men's Downhill
- Location: Planai; Schladming, Austria
- Vertical: 976 m (3,202 ft)
- Top elevation: 1,753 m (5,751 ft)
- Base elevation: 777 m (2,549 ft)
- Longest run: 3.334 km (2.07 mi)

The men's downhill competition at the 2013 World Championships was held on Saturday, February 9, with 58 athletes from 27 nations.

Aksel Lund Svindal of Norway won his second world title in downhill and fifth overall, joined on the podium by Dominik Paris of Italy and David Poisson of France.

The Planai race course was 3.334 km (2.07 mi) in length, with a vertical drop of 976 m (3,202 ft) from a starting elevation of 1,753 m (5,751 ft) above sea level. Svindall's winning time of 121.32 seconds yielded an average speed of 98.932 km/h (61.5 mph) and an average vertical descent rate of 8.045 m/s (26.4 ft/s).

== Results ==
The race was started at 11:00 CET (UTC+1)

Rank	Bib	Name	Country	Time	Difference
1st place, gold medalist(s)	17	Aksel Lund Svindal	Norway	2:01.32	
2nd place, silver medalist(s)	18	Dominik Paris	Italy	2:01.78	+0.46
3rd place, bronze medalist(s)	13	David Poisson	France	2:02.29	+0.97
4	22	Klaus Kröll	Austria	2:02.67	+1.35
5	7	Andreas Romar	Finland	2:02.68	+1.36
6	27	Silvan Zurbriggen	Switzerland	2:02.69	+1.37
7	25	Patrick Küng	Switzerland	2:02.86	+1.54
8	12	Didier Defago	Switzerland	2:02.91	+1.59
9	8	Jan Hudec	Canada	2:02.99	+1.67
10	20	Adrien Theaux	France	2:03.03	+1.71
11	6	Andrej Šporn	Slovenia	2:03.08	+1.76
12	14	Peter Fill	Italy	2:03.18	+1.86
13	3	Matthias Mayer	Austria	2:03.27	+1.95
14	21	Christof Innerhofer	Italy	2:03.40	+2.08
15	1	Brice Roger	France	2:03.46	+2.14
16	9	Werner Heel	Italy	2:03.50	+2.18
17	15	Benjamin Thomsen	Canada	2:03.54	+2.22
18	23	Manuel Osborne-Paradis	Canada	2:03.58	+2.26
19	24	Carlo Janka	Switzerland	2:03.91	+2.59
20	2	Ivica Kostelić	Croatia	2:04.18	+2.86
21	29	Guillermo Fayed	France	2:04.39	+3.07
22	37	Andrew Weibrecht	United States	2:04.57	+3.25
23	10	Max Franz	Austria	2:04.59	+3.27
24	5	Stephan Keppler	Germany	2:05.00	+3.68
25	28	Steven Nyman	United States	2:05.11	+3.79
26	31	Douglas Hedin	Sweden	2:05.25	+3.91
27	33	Ondřej Bank	Czech Republic	2:05.68	+4.36
28	32	Aleksandr Glebov	Russia	2:05.73	+4.41
29	36	Klemen Kosi	Slovenia	2:06.27	+4.95
30	38	Kevin Esteve	Andorra	2:06.90	+5.58
31	40	Ivan Muravyev	Russia	2:07.11	+5.79
32	43	Marc Oliveras	Andorra	2:07.73	+6.41
33	35	Paul de la Cuesta	Spain	2:08.11	+6.79
34	53	Michal Klusak	Poland	2:09.13	+7.81
35	42	Igor Zakurdayev	Kazakhstan	2:09.18	+7.86
36	49	Martin Vráblík	Czech Republic	2:09.27	+7.95
37	47	Christoffer Faarup	Denmark	2:10.72	+9.40
38	56	Willis Feasey	New Zealand	2:10.99	+9.67
39	54	Dmitriy Koshkin	Kazakhstan	2:11.04	+9.72
40	50	Svetoslav Georgiev	Bulgaria	2:11.05	+9.73
41	45	Martin Khuber	Kazakhstan	2:11.87	+10.55
42	51	Roberts Rode	Latvia	2:12.30	+10.98
43	57	Taras Pimenov	Kazakhstan	2:12.94	+11.62
44	58	Rostyslav Feshchuk	Ukraine	2:13.33	+12.01
45	46	Cristian Javier Simari Birkner	Argentina	2:13.83	+12.51
46	55	Ignacio Freeman Crespo	Argentina	2:14.75	+13.43
	39	Maciej Bydliński	Poland	DNS	
	4	Marvin van Heek	Netherlands	DNF	
	11	Marco Sullivan	United States	DNF	
	16	Erik Guay	Canada	DNF	
	19	Hannes Reichelt	Austria	DNF	
	26	Travis Ganong	United States	DNF	
	30	Boštjan Kline	Slovenia	DNF	
	34	Ferran Terra	Spain	DNF	
	41	Yuri Danilochkin	Belarus	DNF	
	44	Max Ullrich	Croatia	DNF	
	48	Nikola Chongarov	Bulgaria	DNF	
	52	Igor Laikert	Bosnia and Herzegovina	DNF	
