= Marcus Sandell =

Finnish alpine skier (born 1987)

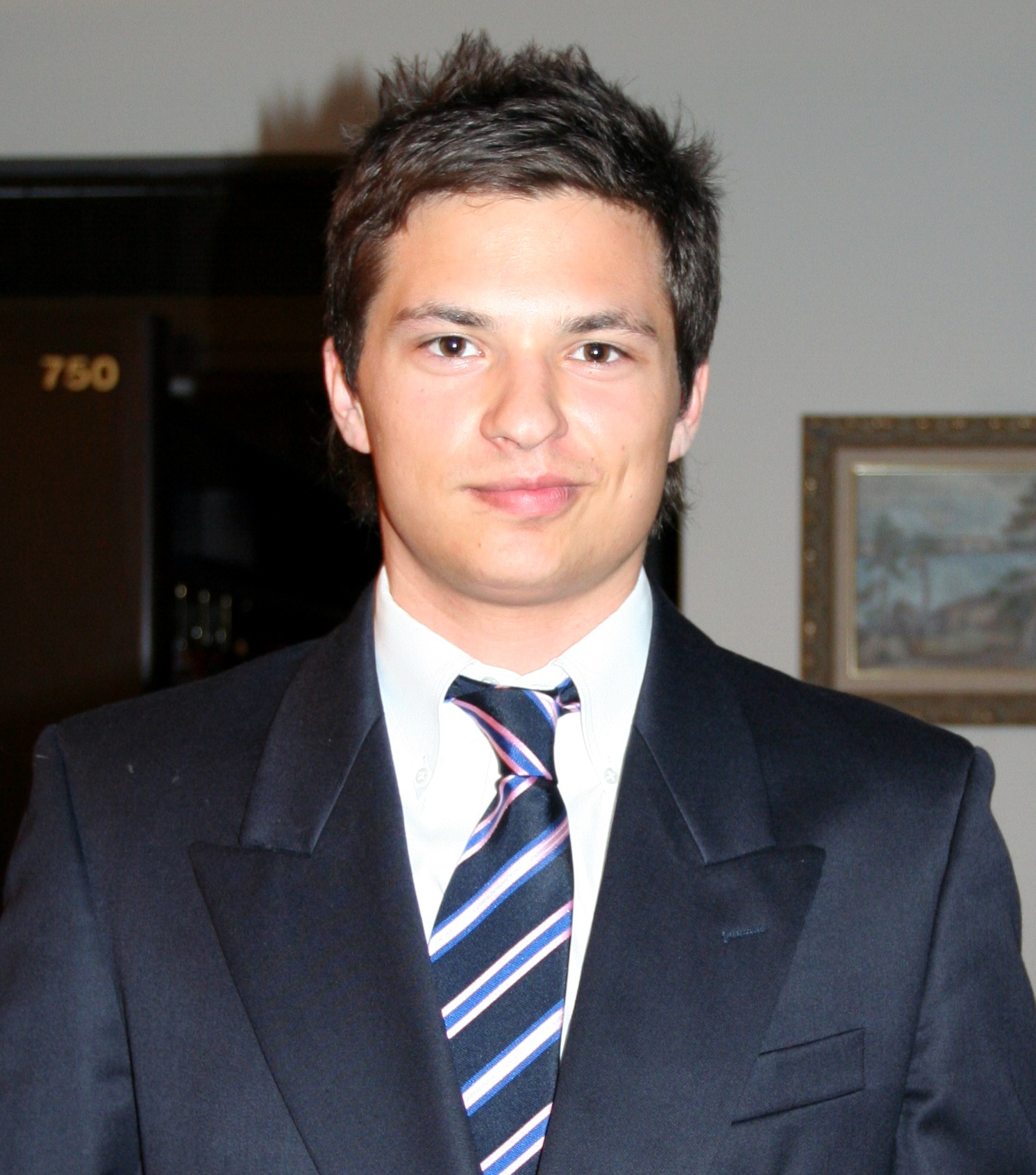

Personal information
- Born: 23 September 1987 (age 38) Espoo, Finland

Skiing career
- Sport: Alpine skiing
- Club: GrIFK Alpine
- Disciplines: Giant slalom
World Cup debut
12 November 2006 (age 19)

Olympics
- Teams: 2 (2010, 2014)
- Medals: 0

World Championships
- Teams: 5 – (2007–2015)
- Medals: 0

World Cup
- Seasons: 10th – (2007–09, 2011–17)
- Wins: 0
- Podiums: 0
- Overall titles: 0 – (33rd in 2013)
- Discipline titles: 0 – (8th in GS, 2013)

Marcus Sandell (born 23 September 1987 in Espoo) is a Finnish alpine skier. He represented Finland at the 2010 Winter Olympics in Vancouver. He suffered serious injury on 28 September 2009 on the training session in nearby Pitztaler glacier, Austria. Due to the crash, his kidney had to be removed at the hospital in Innsbruck. 5 months after his accident, Sandell competed at the 2010 Winter Olympics, and finished at the 19th place in Giant slalom first run. In the second run he skied out and didn't finish the competition.

== World Cup results ==
=== Season standings ===
Season	Age	Overall	Slalom	Giant Slalom	Super G	Downhill	Combined
2007	19	120	—	36	—	—	—
2008	20	59	—	16	—	—	—
2009	21	78	—	24	—	—	46
2010	22	injured: did not compete					
2011	23	99	—	28	—	—	—
2012	24	58	—	19	—	—	—
2013	25	33	—	8	—	—	—
2014	26	56	—	21	—	—	—
2015	27	62	—	18	—	—	—
2016	28	58	—	16	—	—	—
2017	29	135	—	50	—	—	—

=== Results per discipline ===
Discipline	WC starts	WC Top 30	WC Top 15	WC Top 5	WC Podium	Best result		
Discipline	WC starts	WC Top 30	WC Top 15	WC Top 5	WC Podium	Date	Location	Place
Slalom	18	0	0	0	0	12 November 2006	Levi, Finland	33rd
Giant slalom	73	55	27	3	0	24 February 2013	Garmisch-Partenkirchen, Germany	4th
Super-G	5	0	0	0	0	21 February 2008	Whistler, Canada	48th
Downhill	0	0	0	0	0			
Combined	2	1	0	0	0	22 February 2009	Sestriere, Italy	27th
Parallel GS	1	1	0	0	0	21 December 2015	Alta Badia, Italy	18th
Total	99	57	27	3	0			

- standings through 20 Jan 2019

== World Championship results ==
Year
Year	Age	Slalom	Giant; Slalom	Super G	Downhill	Combined	Team Event
2007	19	DNFQ2	DNF1	—	—	—	—
2009	21	DNF2	16	—	—	—	—
2011	23	DNF1	10	—	—	—	—
2013	25	—	12	29	—	—	—
2015	27	—	14	—	—	—	—

== Olympic results ==
Year
Year	Age	Slalom	Giant; Slalom	Super G	Downhill	Combined
2010	22	—	DNF2	—	—	—
2014	26	—	DNF1	—	—	—
