= FIS Alpine World Ski Championships 2013 – Men's super combined =

Men's super combined at the FIS Alpine World Ski Championships 2013
- Venue: Planai; Schladming, Austria
- Date: 11 February 2013
- Competitors: 53 from 25 nations
- Winning time: 2:56.96

Medalists
gold medal	Ted Ligety	United States
silver medal	Ivica Kostelić	Croatia
bronze medal	Romed Baumann	Austria

The men's super combined competition at the 2013 World Championships was held on Monday, 11 February. 53 athletes from 25 nations competed.

== Results ==
The downhill race was started at 12:00 and the slalom race at 18:15.

Rank	Bib	Name	Nation	Downhill	Rank	Slalom	Rank	Total	Difference
1st place, gold medalist(s)	27	Ted Ligety	United States	2:02.10	6	54.86	2	2:56.96	
2nd place, silver medalist(s)	22	Ivica Kostelić	Croatia	2:02.75	10	55.36	4	2:58.11	+1.15
3rd place, bronze medalist(s)	16	Romed Baumann	Austria	2:01.38	1	56.75	11	2:58.13	+1.17
4	9	Andreas Romar	Finland	2:02.93	13	55.37	5	2:58.30	+1.34
5	13	Sandro Viletta	Switzerland	2:03.17	16	55.21	3	2:58.38	+1.42
6	21	Alexis Pinturault	France	2:04.73	22	53.68	1	2:58.41	+1.45
7	8	Silvan Zurbriggen	Switzerland	2:03.01	14	55.41	6	2:58.42	+1.46
8	18	Carlo Janka	Switzerland	2:02.41	8	56.24	10	2:58.65	+1.69
9	15	Dominik Paris	Italy	2:02.07	5	56.81	12	2:58.88	+1.92
10	11	Matthias Mayer	Austria	2:02.16	7	57.21	14	2:59.37	+2.41
11	7	Ondřej Bank	Czech Republic	2:04.26	19	55.43	8	2:59.69	+2.73
12	23	Klemen Kosi	Slovenia	2:02.81	11	58.12	15	3:00.93	+3.97
13	29	Adam Žampa	Slovakia	2:05.56	25	55.68	9	3:01.24	+4.28
14	34	Kevin Esteve	Andorra	2:04.91	23	58.21	16	3:03.12	+6.16
15	1	Martin Vráblík	Czech Republic	2:06.37	29	57.18	13	3:03.55	+6.59
16	26	Maciej Bydliński	Poland	2:04.64	21	58.97	20	3:03.61	+6.65
17	24	Nikola Chongarov	Bulgaria	2:06.15	28	58.62	19	3:04.77	+7.81
18	45	Paul de la Cuesta	Spain	2:05.10	24	59.82	23	3:04.92	+7.96
19	6	Yuri Danilochkin	Belarus	2:05.91	27	59.07	21	3:04.98	+8.02
20	37	Maarten Meiners	Netherlands	2:07.81	34	58.43	18	3:06.24	+9.28
21	48	Igor Laikert	Bosnia and Herzegovina	2:07.05	30	59.45	22	3:06.50	+9.54
22	4	Cristian Javier Simari Birkner	Argentina	2:10.34	38	58.22	17	3:08.56	+11.60
23	28	Aleksandr Khoroshilov	Russia	2:13.75	40	55.42	7	3:09.17	+12.21
24	36	Arjan Wanders	Netherlands	2:07.28	33	1:05.12	25	3:12.40	+15.44
25	5	Marc Berthod	Switzerland	2:03.12	15	1:10.13	27	3:13.25	+16.29
26	52	Rostyslav Feshchuk	Ukraine	2:11.61	39	1:02.35	24	3:13.96	+17.00
27	39	Marc Oliveras	Andorra	2:05.82	26	1:09.86	26	3:15.68	+18.72
28	30	Matteo Marsaglia	Italy	2:02.43	9	1:16.66	28	3:19.09	+22.13
	44	Max Ullrich	Croatia	2:08.69	37	DNF			
	51	Matej Falat	Slovakia	2:08.35	36	DNF			
	50	Dmitriy Koshkin	Kazakhstan	2:07.84	35	DNF			
	25	Georgi Georgiev	Bulgaria	2:07.15	32	DNF			
	43	Igor Zakurdayev	Kazakhstan	2:07.12	31	DNF			
	20	Aksel Lund Svindal	Norway	2:01.52	2	DNF			
	19	Christof Innerhofer	Italy	2:01.76	3	DNF			
	14	Adrien Théaux	France	2:01.78	4	DNF			
	10	Benjamin Raich	Austria	2:02.90	12	DNF			
	38	Thomas Biesemeyer	United States	2:04.41	20	DNF			
	31	Douglas Hedin	Sweden	2:04.18	18	DNF			
	17	Thomas Mermillod-Blondin	France	2:03.68	17	DQ			
	2	Brice Roger	France	DNF					
	3	Ryan Cochran-Siegle	United States	DNF					
	12	Siegmar Klotz	Italy	DNF					
	33	Marvin van Heek	Netherlands	DNF					
	35	Will Brandenburg	United States	DNF					
	40	Martin Khuber	Kazakhstan	DNF					
	46	Michał Kłusak	Poland	DNF					
	47	Roberts Rode	Latvia	DNF					
	53	Ignácio Freeman Crespo	Argentina	DNF					
	32	Ferran Terra	Spain	DQ					
	41	Boštjan Kline	Slovenia	DQ					
	42	Christoffer Faarup	Denmark	DQ					
	49	Taras Pimenov	Kazakhstan	DQ					
