= Georg Streitberger =

Austrian alpine skier

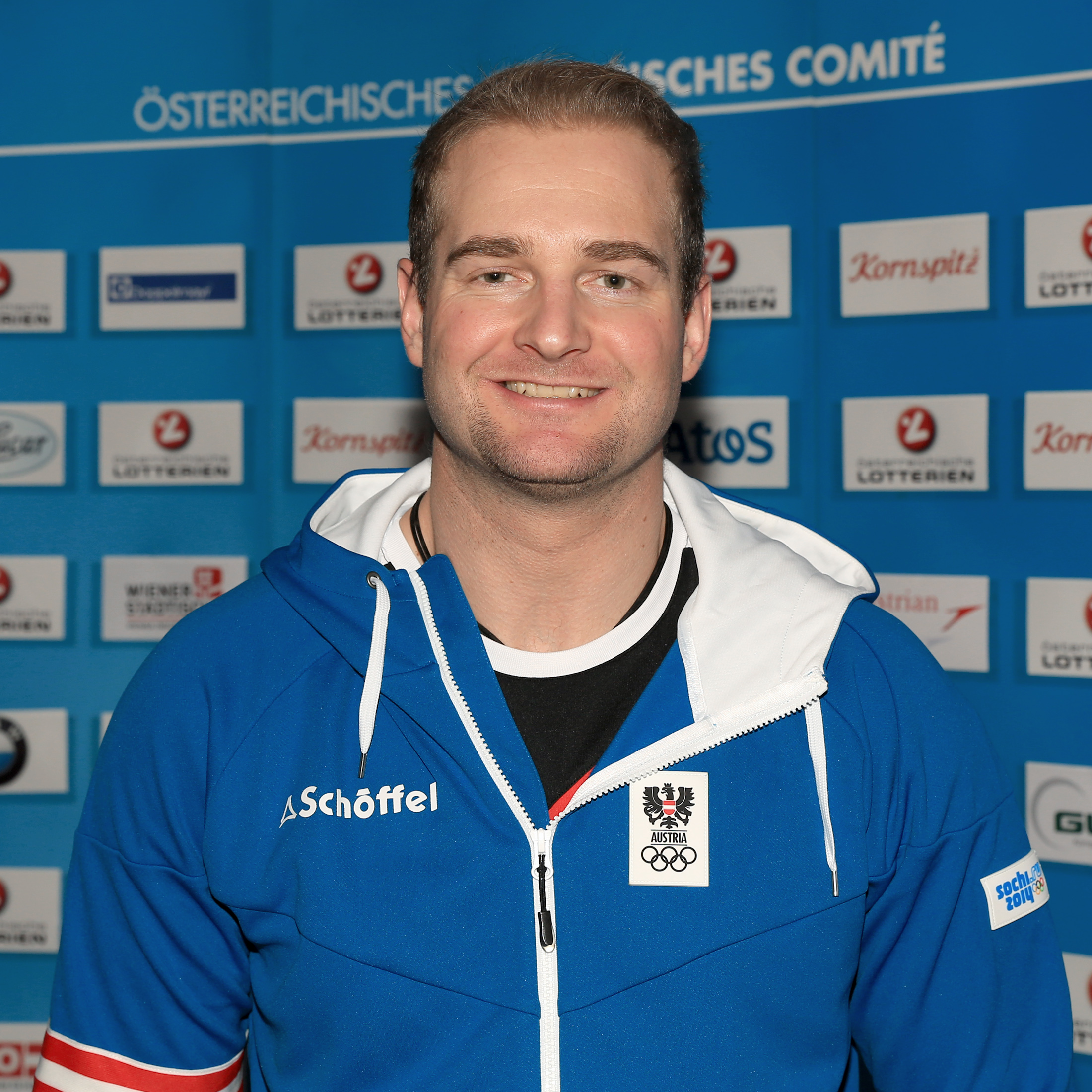
- Streitberger in January 2014

Personal information
- Born: 26 April 1981 (age 45) Zell am See, Salzburg, Austria
- Height: 185 cm (6 ft 1 in)

Skiing career
- Sport: Alpine skiing
- Club: SC Saalbach-Hinterglemm – Salzburg
- Retired: 02 December 2016 (age 35); Val d'Isère, France
- Disciplines: Super G, downhill
- World Cup debut: 18 March 2000 (age 18); Bormio, Italy

Olympics
- Teams: 2 – (2010, 2014)
- Medals: 0

World Championships
- Teams: 2 – (2013, 2015)
- Medals: 0

World Cup
- Seasons: 10 – (2007–16)
- Wins: 3 – (1 DH, 2 SG)
- Podiums: 10 – (3 DH, 7 SG)
- Overall titles: 0 – (19th in 2013)
- Discipline titles: 0 – (2nd in SG, 2011)
Medal record
Men's alpine skiing
Representing Austria
Junior World Ski Championships
Gold medal – first place	2000 Quebec	Giant slalom

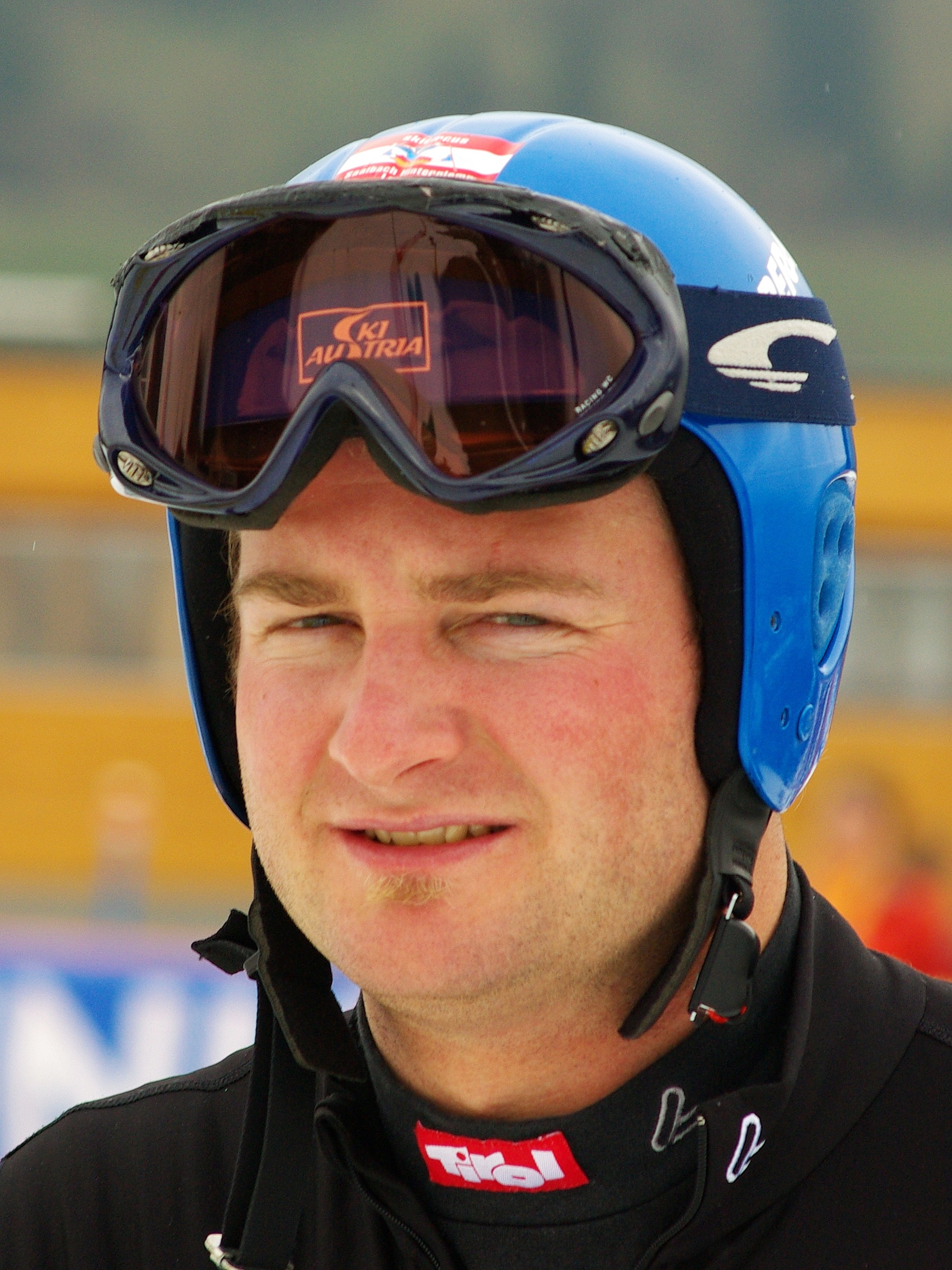
Streitberger in March 2008

Georg Streitberger (born 26 April 1981) is a retired World Cup alpine ski racer from Austria. Born in Zell am See, Salzburg, he specialized in the speed events and won three World Cup races, two in super G and one in downhill.

Streitberger competed for Austria at two Winter Olympics and two World Championships.

His 2016 season ended with a knee injury at the downhill at Kitzbühel, on a difficult dark and windy day on the Streif that also ended the season of overall leader Aksel Lund Svindal.

== World Cup results ==
=== Season standings ===
Season	Age	Overall	Slalom	Giant Slalom	Super G	Downhill	Combined
2000	18	135	—	51	—	—	—
2001	19	did not compete					
2002	20	did not compete					
2003	21	did not compete					
2004	22	did not compete					
2005	23	116	—	—	36	—	—
2006	24	0 points					
2007	25	45	—	—	10	39	—
2008	26	33	—	—	11	22	52
2009	27	50	—	—	23	23	25
2010	28	48	—	—	13	34	—
2011	29	24	—	—	2	23	—
2012	30	52	—	—	20	25	—
2013	31	19	—	—	10	8	—
2014	32	23	—	—	9	14	—
2015	33	23	—	—	16	12	—
2016	34	75	—	—	26	38	—
2017	35	0 points					

=== Race podiums ===
- 3 wins – (1 DH, 2 SG)
- 10 podiums – (3 DH, 7 SG)

Season	Date	Location	Discipline	Place
2008	2 Mar 2008	Kvitfjell, Norway	Super G	1st
2010	22 Jan 2010	Kitzbühel, Austria	Super G	3rd
2011	4 Dec 2010	(United States) Beaver Creek, USA	Super G	1st
2011	21 Jan 2011	Kitzbühel, Austria	Super G	2nd
2013	23 Feb 2013	Garmisch, Germany	Downhill	2nd
2013	3 Mar 2013	Kvitfjell, Norway	Super G	2nd
2014	1 Dec 2013	(United States) Beaver Creek, USA	Super G	3rd
2014	28 Feb 2014	Kvitfjell, Norway	Downhill	1st
2015	23 Jan 2015	Kitzbühel, Austria	Super G	3rd
2015	18 Mar 2015	Méribel, France	Downhill	3rd

== World Championship results ==
Year	Age	Slalom	Giant slalom	Super-G	Downhill	Combined
2013	31	—	—	10	—	—
2015	33	—	—	8	29	—

== Olympic results ==
Year	Age	Slalom	Giant slalom	Super-G	Downhill	Combined
2010	28	—	—	17	—	DNS2
2014	32	—	—	21	17	—
