= Brice Roger =

French alpine skier (born 1990)

Personal information
- Born: 9 August 1990 (age 35) Bourg-Saint-Maurice, Savoie, France
- Height: 1.80 m (5 ft 11 in)

Skiing career
- Sport: Alpine skiing
- Club: Armée-EMHM- C.S. La Plagne
- Disciplines: Downhill, super-G
- World Cup debut: 29 January 2011 (age 20)

Olympics
- Teams: 1 – (2018)
- Medals: 0

World Championships
- Teams: 3 – (2013–2017)
- Medals: 0

World Cup
- Seasons: 11 – (2011–2021)
- Wins: 0
- Podiums: 2 – (2 SG)
- Overall titles: 0 – (49th in 2015)
- Discipline titles: 0 – (15th in SG, 2015)

Brice Roger (born 9 August 1990) is a World Cup alpine ski racer from France. From Bourg-Saint-Maurice, Savoie, he specializes in the speed events of downhill and super-G. He made his World Cup debut at age twenty in January 2011.

Roger was scheduled to compete for France at the 2014 Winter Olympics, but tore his anterior cruciate ligament during training and did not compete. He made the team for the 2018 Games and was eighth in the downhill.

== World Cup results ==
=== Season standings ===
| Season | Age | Overall | Slalom | Giant Slalom | Super G | Downhill | Combined |
|---|---|---|---|---|---|---|---|
| 2012 | 21 | 118 | — | — | — | 51 | 35 |
| 2013 | 22 | 76 | — | — | — | 30 | 25 |
| 2014 | 23 | 76 | — | — | 35 | 34 | — |
| 2015 | 24 | 49 | — | — | 15 | 45 | — |
| 2016 | 25 | 118 | — | — | 50 | 46 | — |
| 2017 | 26 | 93 | — | — | 38 | 33 | — |
| 2018 | 27 | 38 | — | — | 21 | 15 | — |
| 2019 | 28 | 60 | — | — | 17 | 33 | — |

=== Results per discipline ===
| Discipline | WC starts | WC Top 30 | WC Top 15 | WC Top 5 | WC Podium | Best result | | |
| Discipline | WC starts | WC Top 30 | WC Top 15 | WC Top 5 | WC Podium | Date | Location | Place |
|---|---|---|---|---|---|---|---|---|
| Slalom | 1 | 0 | 0 | 0 | 0 | 27 January 2013 | Kitzbühel, Austria | DNF |
| Giant slalom | 0 | 0 | 0 | 0 | 0 | | | |
| Super-G | 32 | 15 | 7 | 2 | 2 | 19 March 2015; 11 March 2018 | Méribel, France; Kvitfjell, Norway | 3rd |
| Downhill | 50 | 29 | 7 | 0 | 0 | 20 January 2018 | Kitzbühel, Austria | 7th |
| Combined | 7 | 2 | 0 | 0 | 0 | 5 February 2012 | Chamonix, France | 20th |
| Total | 90 | 46 | 14 | 2 | 2 | | | |

- Standings through 27 January 2019

=== Race podiums ===
- 2 podiums – (2 SG)

| Season | Date | Location | Discipline | Place |
|---|---|---|---|---|
| 2015 | 19 March 2015 | Méribel, France | Super-G | 3rd |
| 2018 | 11 March 2018 | Kvitfjell, Norway | Super-G | 3rd |

== World Championship results ==
| Year | Age | Slalom | Giant slalom | Super-G | Downhill | Combined |
|---|---|---|---|---|---|---|
| 2013 | 22 | — | — | — | 15 | DNF1 |
| 2015 | 24 | — | — | 12 | — | — |
| 2017 | 26 | — | — | 18 | 10 | — |
| 2019 | 28 | — | — | 7 | 19 | — |

== Olympic results ==
| Year | Age | Slalom | Giant slalom | Super-G | Downhill | Combined |
|---|---|---|---|---|---|---|
| 2018 | 27 | — | — | 19 | 8 | — |
