= Benjamin Thomsen =

Canadian alpine skier (born 1987)

Ben Thomsen
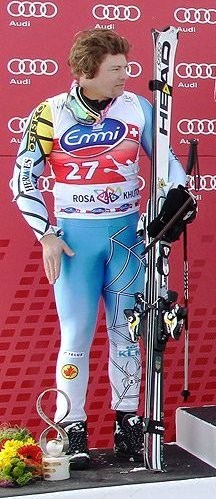
- Podium finish in February 2012

Personal information
- Full name: Benjamin Thomsen
- Born: August 25, 1987 (age 39) Invermere, British Columbia, Canada
- Height: 1.70 m (5 ft 7 in)

Skiing career
- Sport: Alpine skiing
- Club: Windermere Valley SC
- Disciplines: Downhill, Super G
- World Cup debut: March 6, 2010 (age 22)

Olympics
- Teams: 2 – (2014, 2018)
- Medals: 0

World Championships
- Teams: 5 – (2011–15, 2019)
- Medals: 0

World Cup
- Seasons: 10th – (2011–2020)
- Wins: 0
- Podiums: 1 – (1 DH)
- Overall titles: 0 – (42nd in 2012)
- Discipline titles: 0 – (15th in DH, 2012)

Benjamin Thomsen (born August 25, 1987), also known as Ben Thomsen, is a World Cup alpine ski racer from Canada. Born in Invermere, British Columbia, he primarily competes in the speed events of Downhill and Super G. Thomsen's father Glenn is a former national team coach for Alpine Canada. Thomsen made his World Cup debut in March 2010; his only podium came in February 2012, a second-place finish at the pre-Olympic downhill at Rosa Khutor in Russia.

== World Cup results ==
=== Season standings ===
Season
Season	Age	Overall	Slalom	Giant; Slalom	Super G	Downhill	Combined
2011	23	109	—	—	—	37	54
2012	24	42	—	—	58	15	—
2013	25	77	—	—	50	30	—
2014	26	97	—	—	43	39	—
2015	27	73	—	—	—	25	—
2016	28	81	—	—	—	28	—
2017	29	no World Cup points					
2018	30	88	—	—	42	32	—
2019	31	52	—	—	42	17	—
2020	32	99	—	—	—	39	—

Standings through 10 December 2019

=== Top ten results ===
- 1 podium – (1 DH)

Season	Date	Location	Discipline	Place
2012	4 Feb 2012	Chamonix, France	Downhill	5th
2012	11 Feb 2012	Sochi, Russia	Downhill	2nd
2012	3 Mar 2012	Kvitfjell, Norway	Downhill	9th
2012	14 Mar 2012	Schladming, Austria	Downhill	10th
2015	21 Feb 2015	Saalbach, Austria	Downhill	8th
2016	29 Dec 2015	Santa Caterina, Italy	Downhill	8th
2019	15 Dec 2018	Val Gardena, Italy	Downhill	10th
2019	28 Dec 2018	Bormio, Italy	Downhill	10th

== World Championship results ==
Year	Age	Slalom	Giant slalom	Super-G	Downhill	Combined
2011	23	—	—	19	18	—
2013	25	—	—	19	17	—
2015	27	—	—	27	18	—
2017	29	Injured: did not compete				
2019	31	—	—	17	7	—

== Olympic results ==
Year	Age	Slalom	Giant slalom	Super-G	Downhill	Combined
2014	26	—	—	—	19	—
2018	30	—	—	—	28	DNS2
