= FIS Alpine World Ski Championships 2011 – Men's downhill =

Men's downhill at the FIS Alpine World Ski Championships 2011
- Venue: Kandahar 2, Garmisch Classic
- Location: Garmisch-Partenkirchen, Germany
- Dates: 12 February
- Competitors: 54 from 24 nations
- Winning time: 1:58.41

Medalists
gold medal	Erik Guay	Canada
silver medal	Didier Cuche	Switzerland
bronze medal	Christof Innerhofer	Italy

Men's Downhill
- Location: Kandahar 2 Garmisch Classic, Garmisch-Partenkirchen, Germany
- Vertical: 920 m (3,018 ft)
- Top elevation: 1,690 m (5,545 ft)
- Base elevation: 770 m (2,526 ft)
- Longest run: 3.300 km (2.05 mi)

The Men's Downhill competition at the 2011 World Championships at Garmisch-Partenkirchen, Germany, was the fourth race of the championships, run under spring-like conditions on Saturday, February 12.

Canada's Erik Guay won the gold medal, Didier Cuche of Switzerland took the silver, and the bronze medalist was Christof Innerhofer of Italy.

Mostly in the shade, the north-facing slope of the Kandahar 2 course at Garmisch Classic was 3.300 km (2.05 mi) in length, with a vertical drop of 920 m (3,018 ft) from a starting elevation of 1,690 m (5,545 ft) above sea level. Guay's winning time of 118.41 seconds yielded an average speed of 100.329 km/h (62.3 mph) and an average vertical descent rate of 7.7696 m/s (25.5 ft/s). Fifty four athletes from 24 countries competed.

== Results ==
The race started at 11:00 CET (UTC+1) under clear skies. The air temperature was 3 °C (37 °F) at the starting gate and 9 °C (48 °F) at the finish.

Rank	Bib	Name	Nation	Time	Difference
1st place, gold medalist(s)	10	Erik Guay	Canada	1:58.41	—
2nd place, silver medalist(s)	18	Didier Cuche	Switzerland	1:58.73	+0.32
3rd place, bronze medalist(s)	9	Christof Innerhofer	Italy	1:59.17	+0.76
4	20	Romed Baumann	Austria	1:59.51	+1.10
5	17	Aksel Lund Svindal	Norway	1:59.83	+1.42
6	12	Andrej Šporn	Slovenia	2:00.25	+1.84
7	16	Michael Walchhofer	Austria	2:00.28	+1.87
8	13	Johan Clarey	France	2:00.35	+1.94
9	29	Beat Feuz	Switzerland	2:00.47	+2.06
10	6	Ambrosi Hoffmann	Switzerland	2:00.48	+2.07
11	21	Klaus Kröll	Austria	2:00.58	+2.17
12	19	Silvan Zurbriggen	Switzerland	2:00.75	+2.34
13	5	Steven Nyman	United States	2:00.80	+2.39
14	14	Peter Fill	Italy	2:00.81	+2.40
15	22	Bode Miller	United States	2:00.83	+2.42
16	26	Hannes Reichelt	Austria	2:00.99	+2.58
17	8	Andrej Jerman	Slovenia	2:01.16	+2.75
18	4	Benjamin Thomsen	Canada	2:01.18	+2.77
19	2	Rok Perko	Slovenia	2:01.50	+3.09
20	25	Dominik Paris	Italy	2:01.55	+3.14
21	35	Ondřej Bank	Czech Republic	2:01.77	+3.36
22	15	Werner Heel	Italy	2:01.79	+3.38
23	28	Guillermo Fayed	France	2:01.99	+3.58
24	31	Travis Ganong	United States	2:02.19	+3.78
25	23	Jan Hudec	Canada	2:02.45	+4.04
26	30	Hans Olsson	Sweden	2:02.49	+4.08
27	32	Andreas Romar	Finland	2:02.50	+4.09
28	7	Natko Zrnčić-Dim	Croatia	2:02.57	+4.16
29	1	Yannick Bertrand	France	2:02.66	+4.25
30	24	Gašper Markič	Slovenia	2:02.99	+4.58
31	27	Tobias Stechert	Germany	2:03.31	+4.90
32	37	Ferrán Terra	Spain	2:03.79	+5.38
33	34	Mirko Deflorian	Moldova	2:04.04	+5.63
34	43	Kevin Esteve Rigail	Andorra	2:04.58	+6.17
35	36	Lars Elton Myhre	Norway	2:04.93	+6.52
36	45	Georgi Georgiev	Bulgaria	2:05.19	+6.78
37	42	Paul de la Cuesta	Spain	2:05.74	+7.33
38	39	TJ Baldwin	Great Britain	2:06.54	+8.13
39	50	Nikola Chongarov	Bulgaria	2:06.57	+8.16
40	44	Yuri Danilochkin	Belarus	2:06.99	+8.58
41	48	Michał Kłusak	Poland	2:07.64	+9.23
42	40	Igor Zakurdaev	Kazakhstan	2:07.66	+9.25
43	51	Igor Laikert	(Bosnia and Herzegovina) Bosnia	2:08.70	+10.29
44	54	Rostyslav Feshchuk	Ukraine	2:09.69	+11.28
45	47	Dmitriy Koshkin	Kazakhstan	2:11.47	+13.06
46	53	Taras Pimenov	Kazakhstan	2:12.30	+13.89
47	52	Pavel Chernichenko	Kazakhstan	2:13.25	+14.84
	3	Patrik Järbyn	Sweden	DNF	
	11	Adrien Théaux	France	DNF	
	33	Andreas Sander	Germany	DNF	
	38	Tin Široki	Croatia	DNF	
	41	Roger Vidosa	Andorra	DNF	
	46	Roberts Rode	Latvia	DNF	
	49	Martin Vráblík	Czech Republic	DNF	
