= Christoffer Faarup =

Danish alpine skier (born 1992)

Personal information
- Born: 28 December 1992 (age 33) Aarhus, Denmark
- Height: 1.86 m (6 ft 1 in)

Skiing career
- Sport: Alpine skiing
- Disciplines: Super-G, downhill
- World Cup debut: 13 March 2011 (age 18)

Olympics
- Teams: 2 (2014, 2018)

World Championships
- Teams: 5 – (2011–19)

World Cup
- Seasons: 8 – (2011–12, 2014–19)

Christoffer Faarup (born 28 December 1992) is a Danish former alpine skier. He competed at the 2014 Winter Olympics and 2018 Winter Olympics. In 2007, he moved to Øyer Municipality in Norway to pursue winter sports. He is a member of Hobro Skilklub and Lillehammer Skiklub.

== World Cup results ==
=== Results per discipline ===
Discipline	WC starts	WC Top 30	WC Top 15	WC Top 5	WC Podium	Best result		
Discipline	WC starts	WC Top 30	WC Top 15	WC Top 5	WC Podium	Date	Location	Place
Slalom	0	0	0	0	0			
Giant slalom	0	0	0	0	0			
Super-G	18	0	0	0	0	11 March 2018	Kvitfjell, Norway	36th
Downhill	21	0	0	0	0	13 January 2018	Wengen, Switzerland	43rd
Combined	3	0	0	0	0	29 December 2017	Bormio, Italy	36th
Total	42	0	0	0	0			

- Standings through 25 January 2019

== World Championship results ==
Year
Year	Age	Slalom	Giant; Slalom	Super G	Downhill	Combined
2011	18	—	—	DNF	—	—
2013	20	DNF1	51	56	37	DSQ1
2015	22	—	—	40	38	31
2017	24	—	—	27	30	26
2019	26	—	—	26	22	DNS2

== Olympic results ==
Year
Year	Age	Slalom	Giant; Slalom	Super G	Downhill	Combined
2014	21	—	—	46	37	34
2018	25	—	—	32	36	30
