= Nikola Chongarov =

Bulgarian alpine skier (born 1989)

Personal information
- Born: 20 September 1989 (age 36) Varna, Bulgaria

Skiing career
- Sport: Alpine skiing
- Disciplines: Slalom
- World Cup debut: 15 November 2009 (age 20)

Olympics
- Teams: 1 (2014)

World Championships
- Teams: 3 – (2009–13)

World Cup
- Seasons: 5 – (2010–14)

Nikola Chongarov (Bulgarian: Никола Чонгаров, born 20 September 1989 in Varna, Bulgaria) is a former alpine, current ski cross skier from Bulgaria. He competed for Bulgaria at the 2014 Winter Olympics in all five alpine skiing events.

Chongarov competed FIS Alpine Ski World Cup between 2009-2014. Since 2016 he competed FIS Freestyle Ski World Cup.

== World Cup results ==
=== Alpine skiing ===
==== Season standings ====
Season
| Season | Age | Overall | Slalom | Giant; Slalom | Super G | Downhill | Combined |
| 2012 | 22 | 109 | — | — | — | — | 27 |

==== Results per discipline ====
| Discipline | WC starts | WC Top 30 | WC Top 15 | WC Top 5 | WC Podium | Best result | | |
| Discipline | WC starts | WC Top 30 | WC Top 15 | WC Top 5 | WC Podium | Date | Location | Place |
|---|---|---|---|---|---|---|---|---|
| Slalom | 7 | 0 | 0 | 0 | 0 | 15 January 2012 | Wengen, Switzerland | 38th |
| Giant slalom | 3 | 0 | 0 | 0 | 0 | 18 February 2012 | Bansko, Bulgaria | 40th |
| Super-G | 1 | 0 | 0 | 0 | 0 | 26 January 2014 | Kitzbühel, Austria | 83rd |
| Downhill | 3 | 0 | 0 | 0 | 0 | 11 February 2012 | Sochi, Russia | 48th |
| Combined | 8 | 2 | 1 | 0 | 0 | 22 January 2012 | Kitzbühel, Austria | 15th |
| Total | 22 | 2 | 1 | 0 | 0 | | | |

=== Freestyle skiing ===
==== Results per discipline ====
| Discipline | WC starts | WC Top 30 | WC Top 15 | WC Top 5 | WC Podium | Best result | | |
| Discipline | WC starts | WC Top 30 | WC Top 15 | WC Top 5 | WC Podium | Date | Location | Place |
|---|---|---|---|---|---|---|---|---|
| Ski cross | 13 | 0 | 0 | 0 | 0 | 12 December 2017 | Arosa, Switzerland | 43rd |
| Total | 13 | 0 | 0 | 0 | 0 | | | |

== World Championship results ==
=== Alpine skiing ===
Year
| Year | Age | Slalom | Giant; Slalom | Super G | Downhill | Combined | Team Event |
| 2009 | 19 | DNFQ1 | 42 | DNF | — | DNF2 | —N/a |
| 2011 | 21 | 31 | DNF1 | DNF | 39 | 22 | — |
| 2013 | 23 | DNFQ2 | 34 | 38 | DNF | 17 | — |

== World Championship results ==
=== Freestyle skiing ===
Year
| Year | Age | Moguls | Dual moguls | Aerials | Halfpipe | Slopestyle | Ski cross |
| 2017 | 27 | — | — | — | — | — | 38 |
| 2019 | 29 | — | — | — | — | — | 34 |

== Olympic results ==
Year
| Year | Age | Slalom | Giant; Slalom | Super G | Downhill | Combined |
| 2014 | 24 | DNF2 | — | 39 | 38 | 23 |
