= Mirko Deflorian =

Italian alpine skier

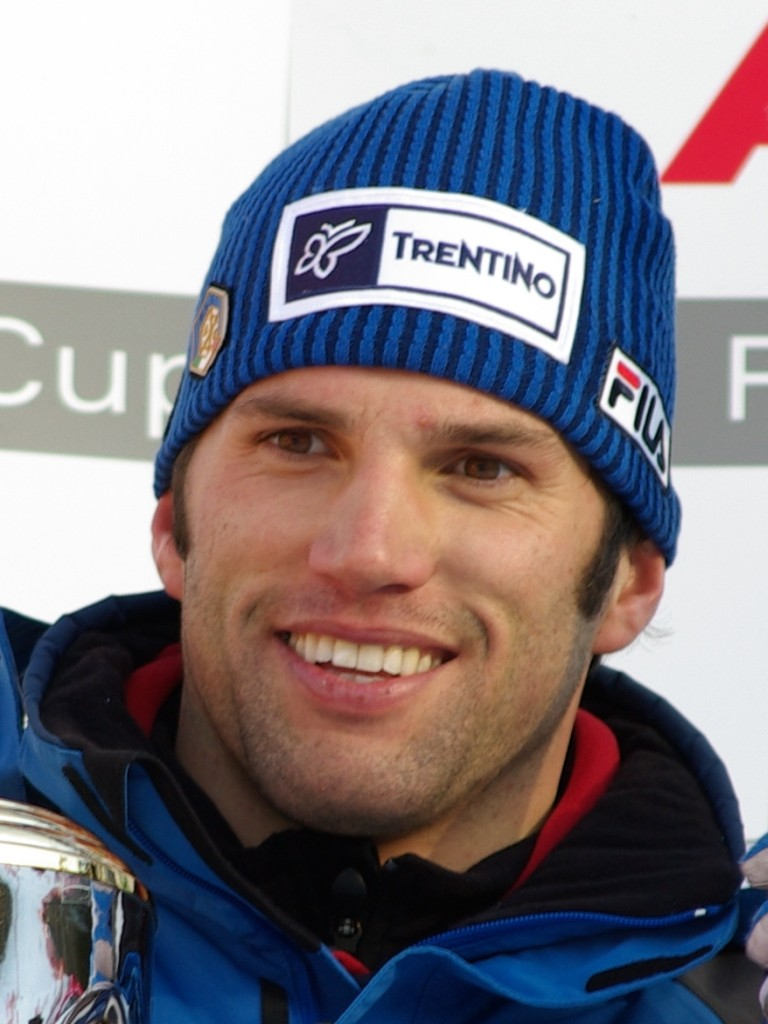
- Deflorian in 2008.

Personal information
- Born: 19 May 1980 (age 46) Cavalese, Italy

Skiing career
- Sport: Alpine skiing
- Club: G.S. Fiamme Gialle
- Retired: 2013
- Disciplines: Polyvalent
- World Cup debut: 1996

World Championships
- Teams: 3
- Medals: 0

World Cup
- Seasons: 18
- Podiums: 0

Mirko Deflorian (born 19 May 1980) is a former Italian World Cup alpine ski racer.

== Biography ==
He retired from competitions in 2013, however in 2014 Deflorian cherished the dream of participating in his first Olympics, becoming naturalized and thus obtaining the qualification for Moldava at the 2014 Winter Olympics. But in the end he gave up the participation motivating him with the poor results obtained.

== World Championship results ==
Year
Year	Age	Slalom	Giant; Slalom	Super-G	Downhill	Combined
Representing Italy
2005	24	-	DNF1	-	-	-
Representing Moldova
2011	30	-	DNF2	DNF	33	14
2013	32	-	DNF1	-	-	-
