= Sergey Ridzik =

Russian freestyle skier

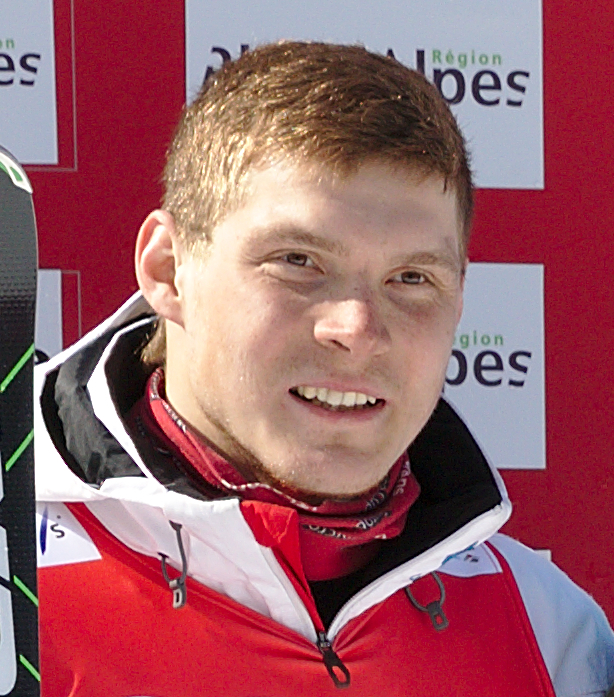
- Ridzik in 2015

Personal information
- Full name: Sergey Sergeyevich Ridzik
- Nationality: Russia
- Born: 25 October 1992 (age 33) Monchegorsk, Murmansk Oblast, Russia

Sport
- Sport: Skiing
Medal record
Men's freestyle skiing
Representing ROC
Olympic Games
Bronze medal – third place	2022 Beijing	Ski cross
Representing Olympic Athletes from Russia
Olympic Games
Bronze medal – third place	2018 Pyeongchang	Ski cross

Sergey Sergeyevich Ridzik (Russian: Сергей Серге́евич Ридзик, born 25 October 1992, Monchegorsk, Murmansk Oblast, Russia) is a Russian freestyle skier. Competing for Independent Olympic Athletes from Russia at the 2018 Winter Olympics, he won a bronze medal in the ski cross. He replicated this success at the 2022 Winter Olympics in Beijing.

== Career ==
Ridzik was an alpine skier but, in 2011, switched to freestyle skiing. He did not qualify for the 2014 Winter Olympics, and after the Olympics was seriously injured and could not compete for several months. On 15 December 2017, he won a World Cup race in Montafon, his only World Cup win by the time of the Olympics.

He subsequently qualified for the 2018 Winter Olympics and made it to the big final, where four athletes competed for the medals. In the finals, Ridzik collided with Kevin Drury, and they both fell. Ridzik stood up and finished third, getting the bronze medal (Drury was subsequently disqualified).
