= David Duncan (ski cross) =

Canadian freestyle skier (born 1982)

Dave Duncan
Personal information
- Full name: David Duncan
- Nationality: Canadian
- Born: July 15, 1982 (age 43) London, Ontario

Sport
- Country: Canada
- Sport: Freestyle skiing
- Event: Ski cross
- Team: Canada Ski Cross Team
Medal record
Men's freestyle skiing
Representing Canada
Winter X Games
Silver medal – second place	2010 Aspen	Ski cross
Bronze medal – third place	2012 Aspen	Ski cross

Dave Duncan (born July 15, 1982 in London, Ontario) is a World Cup freestyle skier. Duncan is currently a member of the Canadian National Ski Cross Team.

== Career ==
Duncan had a successful and breakout season during the 2009–10 Freestyle Skiing World Cup. He earned his first career World Cup top ten finish, placing 9th at the World Cup in Branaes, Sweden. Duncan needed to finish 5th or better at the January 24, Lake Placid ski-cross event to qualify for the Olympics, and in the final he won bronze thereby qualifying for the 2010 Winter Olympics in Vancouver. Alongside his bronze at Lake Placid Duncan also won a bronze medal in St. Johann in Tirol/Oberndorf, Austria on January 5.

Beside being a freestyle skier, Duncan is an aspiring helicopter pilot who also graduated from the University of Alaska after four years of schooling. He is sponsored by Stoeckli, POC, Osisko, Boler MTN and Mount 7 Lodges.

During a training run at the 2010 Winter Olympics, Duncan broke his collarbone and therefore was not able to compete. Taking his place was supposed to be Brady Leman of Calgary, Alberta. However, Leman aggravated a broken tibia he suffered the previous year and was also unable to compete. Replacing both of them was Davey Barr of Brackendale, British Columbia.

Duncan competed for Canada at the 2018 Winter Olympics in Pyeongchang and finished eighth in ski cross. On February 24, he, along with his wife Maja and technical ski coach Willy Raine, were arrested in Pyeongchang for stealing a car while under the influence on their way back to the Olympic Village. They were later released and fined for the incident and were not allowed to participate in the closing ceremony.

== Notable results ==
- 1st - World Cup, Innichen, ITA (21/12/2013)
- 1st - World Cup, Innichen, ITA (22/12/2013)
- 1st - Canadian National Championships, Canada Olympic Park, CAN (23/03/2009)
- 2nd - World Cup, Bischofsweisen/Goetschen, GER (26/2/2012)
- 3rd - World Cup, Val Thorens, FRA (17/1/2014)
- 4th - World Cup, Innichen, ITA (22/12/2016)
- 6th - World Cup, Arosa, SUI (12/12/2017)
- 8th - 2018 Winter Olympics, Pyeongchang, KOR (21/2/2018)
