= Silvan Zurbriggen =

Swiss alpine skier

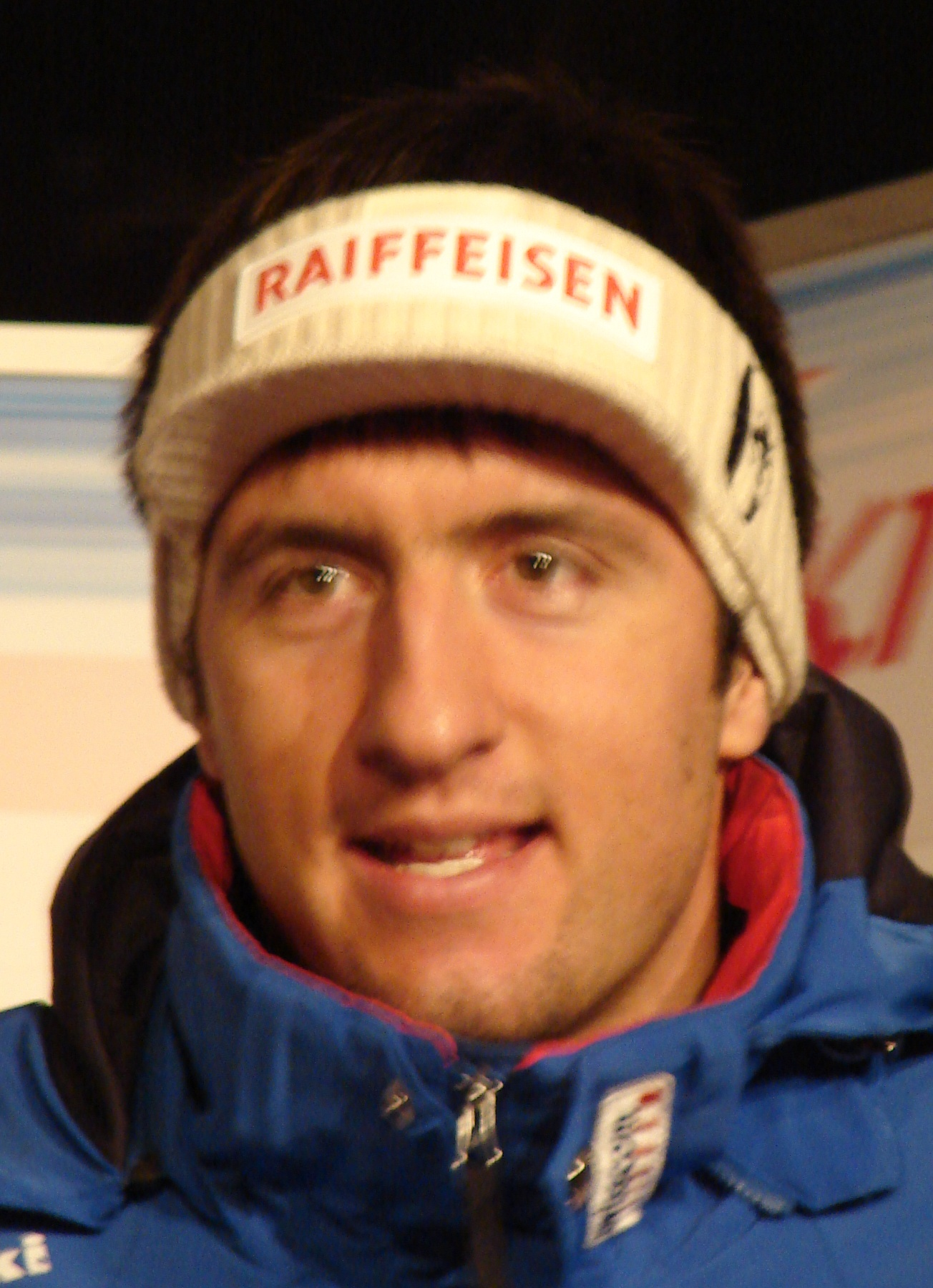
- Zurbriggen in December 2006

Personal information
- Born: 15 August 1981 (age 44) Brig, Valais, Switzerland
- Height: 6 ft 1 in (185 cm)
- Website: www.silvanzurbriggen.ch

Skiing career
- Sport: Alpine skiing
- Club: Saas-Almagell
- Retired: 1 April 2015 (age 33)
- Disciplines: Downhill, Combined, Super G
- World Cup debut: 20 January 2002 (age 20)

Olympics
- Teams: 2 – (2006, 2010)
- Medals: 1 (0 gold)

World Championships
- Teams: 7 – (2003–15)
- Medals: 1 (0 gold)

World Cup
- Seasons: 14 – (2002–15)
- Wins: 2 – (1 DH, 1 SC)
- Podiums: 13 – (2 DH, 3 SL, 8 SC)
- Overall titles: 0 – (6th in 2011)
- Discipline titles: 0 – (2nd in SC, 2009)
Medal record
Men's alpine skiing
Representing Switzerland
Olympic Games
| Bronze medal – third place | 2010 Vancouver | Combined |
World Championships
| Silver medal – second place | 2003 St. Moritz | Slalom |

Silvan Zurbriggen (born 15 August 1981) is a retired Swiss World Cup alpine ski racer who competed primarily in downhill and combined, and occasionally in super-G. In 2012, he stopped competing in slalom due to poor results.

Born in Brig, Valais, Zurbriggen represented Switzerland in seven world championships and two Olympics. He won the silver medal in the slalom before a home crowd at the world championships in 2003 at St. Moritz, and was the Olympic bronze medalist in the combined in 2010 in Vancouver, British Columbia, Canada, held at Whistler. Following his silver medal at age 21, he was the Swiss Winter Sportsman of the year in 2002 / 2003.

Zurbriggen retired from World Cup competition in April 2015 at age 33 with two victories and thirteen podiums. He is a distant cousin of former Swiss ski racers Pirmin Zurbriggen and Heidi Zurbriggen, and the cousin of Elia Zurbriggen.

Following his racing career, he embarked on a career in banking with an 18-month internship at Raiffeisen.

== World Cup results ==
=== Season standings ===
| Season | Age | Overall | Slalom | Giant Slalom | Super G | Downhill | Combined |
|---|---|---|---|---|---|---|---|
| 2003 | 21 | 54 | 18 | — | — | — | — |
| 2004 | 22 | 30 | 13 | — | — | — | — |
| 2005 | 23 | 24 | 12 | — | 35 | 22 | — |
| 2006 | 24 | 49 | 35 | — | 43 | 48 | 10 |
| 2007 | 25 | 13 | 14 | — | 18 | 26 | 4 |
| 2008 | 26 | 66 | 33 | — | 36 | 46 | 26 |
| 2009 | 27 | 18 | 19 | — | 32 | 34 | 2 |
| 2010 | 28 | 8 | 3 | 32 | 33 | 38 | 4 |
| 2011 | 29 | 6 | 18 | 49 | 17 | 4 | 4 |
| 2012 | 30 | 33 | — | — | 23 | 26 | 6 |
| 2013 | 31 | 75 | — | — | 30 | 34 | 23 |
| 2014 | 32 | 72 | — | — | 54 | 32 | 20 |
| 2015 | 33 | 62 | — | — | — | 27 | 15 |

=== Race podiums ===
- 2 wins – (1 Downhill, 1 Combined)
- 13 podiums – (2 Downhill, 3 Slalom, 8 Combined)

| Season | Date | Location | Discipline | Place |
|---|---|---|---|---|
| 2005 | 13 Dec 2004 | Sestriere, Italy | Slalom | 2nd |
| 2007 | 14 Jan 2007 | Wengen, Switzerland | Super combined | 3rd |
| 2007 | 9 Mar 2007 | Kvitfjell, Norway | Super combined | 2nd |
| 2009 | 16 Jan 2009 | Wengen, Switzerland | Super combined | 3rd |
| 2009 | 25 Jan 2009 | Kitzbühel, Austria | Combined | 1st |
| 2010 | 21 Dec 2009 | Alta Badia, Italy | Slalom | 2nd |
| 2010 | 15 Jan 2010 | Wengen, Switzerland | Super combined | 3rd |
| 2010 | 24 Jan 2010 | Kitzbühel, Austria | Combined | 2nd |
| 2010 | 26 Jan 2010 | Schladming, Austria | Slalom | 2nd |
| 2011 | 18 Dec 2010 | Val Gardena, Italy | Downhill | 1st |
| 2011 | 29 Dec 2010 | Bormio, Italy | Downhill | 2nd |
| 2011 | 23 Jan 2011 | Kitzbühel, Austria | Combined | 2nd |
| 2012 | 22 Jan 2012 | Kitzbühel, Austria | Combined | 3rd |

== World Championship results ==
| Year | Age | Slalom | Giant slalom | Super-G | Downhill | Combined |
|---|---|---|---|---|---|---|
| 2003 | 21 | 2 | — | — | — | 5 |
| 2005 | 23 | 7 | — | — | — | 5 |
| 2007 | 25 | DNF1 | — | 14 | — | 8 |
| 2009 | 27 | DNF2 | — | — | — | 4 |
| 2011 | 29 | DNF1 | — | 13 | 12 | DNF2 |
| 2013 | 31 | — | — | DSQ | 6 | 7 |
| 2015 | 33 | — | — | — | — | 15 |

== Olympic results ==
| Year | Age | Slalom | Giant slalom | Super-G | Downhill | Combined |
|---|---|---|---|---|---|---|
| 2006 | 24 | 15 | — | — | — | DNF2 |
| 2010 | 28 | 12 | — | — | — | 3 |
