= Brady Leman =

Canadian freestyle skier

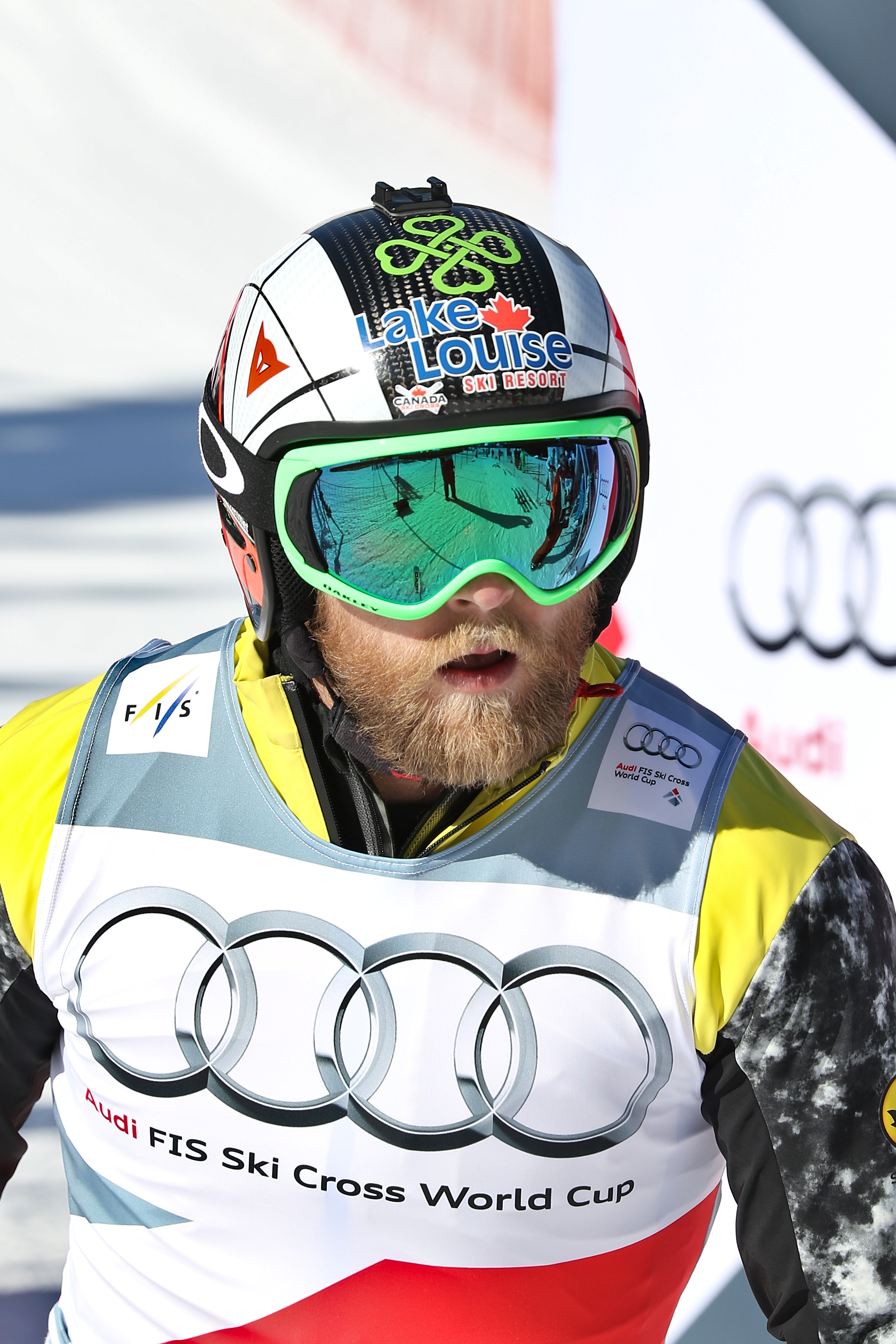
- Leman in 2015

Personal information
- Nickname: Wombat
- Born: October 16, 1986 (age 39) Calgary, Alberta
- Height: 190 cm (6 ft 3 in)
- Weight: 92 kg (203 lb)

Sport
- Country: Canada
- Sport: Freestyle skiing
- Event: Ski Cross
- Team: Canada Ski Cross

Achievements and titles
- Olympic finals: 3 (Sochi 2014, Pyeongchang 2018, Beijing 2022)
Medal record
Men's freestyle skiing
Representing Canada
Winter Olympic Games
Gold medal – first place	2018 Pyeongchang	Ski cross
World Championships
Silver medal – second place	2019 Utah	Ski cross
Winter X Games
Gold medal – first place	2016 Aspen	Ski cross
Bronze medal – third place	2010 Aspen	Ski cross

Brady Leman (born October 16, 1986) is a Canadian freestyle skier specializing in ski cross, and an Olympic champion in that discipline following his victory in the ski cross event at the 2018 Winter Olympics in Pyeongchang, South Korea.

== Career ==
He won the opening event in the 2011–12 season after returning from multiple injuries and then finished the year as the second overall ranked male ski cross racer for the year. Leman, a former alpine skier, is noted for his smooth gliding and crisp passing skills. He was part of a Canadian sweep of the medals at the 2010 Winter X Games, where he finished in third place. Brady Leman skis for Elan as well as the Lake Louise Ski Resort. He also won the 2016 X Games Skier X event.

A medal favourite at the 2010 Vancouver Olympics, Leman was unable to compete after a crash in a training run left him with a broken leg.

Brady previously finished fourth in the 2014 Winter Olympics in Sochi, Russia, after crashing in the final bank.

=== 2018 Winter Olympics ===
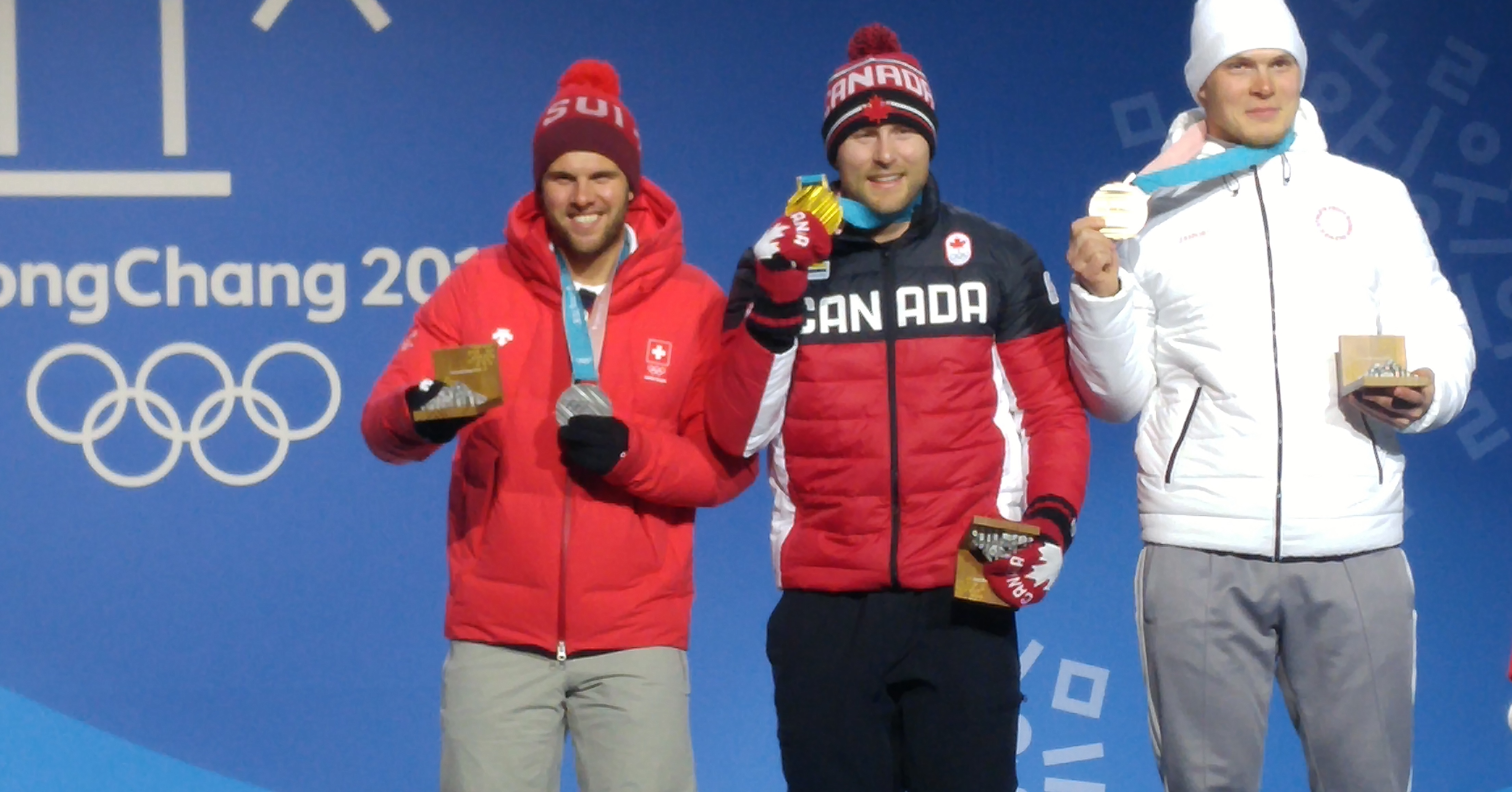
Leman (centre) after receiving his gold medal for his victory

After dropping a ski pole in his seeding run, Leman still qualified for the 8th position. Leman was dominant through the heats on race day and won one of Canada's 11 gold medals at the Pyeongchang 2018 Winter Olympic Games. Canadian teammate Kevin Drury also raced in the Men's Big Final but crashed after making contact with Sergey Ridzik of Russia and finished fourth. After finishing fourth at Sochi in 2014, Leman leapt to the top of the podium in Pyeongchang. After the race, he said of all his difficulties in Vancouver and Sochi, "This blows them [Sochi and Vancouver] out of the water. I broke my leg the day before competition in Vancouver, and then just missing the podium in Sochi was kind of bittersweet. Fourth at the Games is a big accomplishment, but at the same time, you're the first guy who doesn't get a medal. It's been a rocky road for me at the Olympics. Now, that doesn't matter, and I'd do it all over again if it meant a gold medal."
