= Christoph Wahrstötter =

Austrian freestyle skier

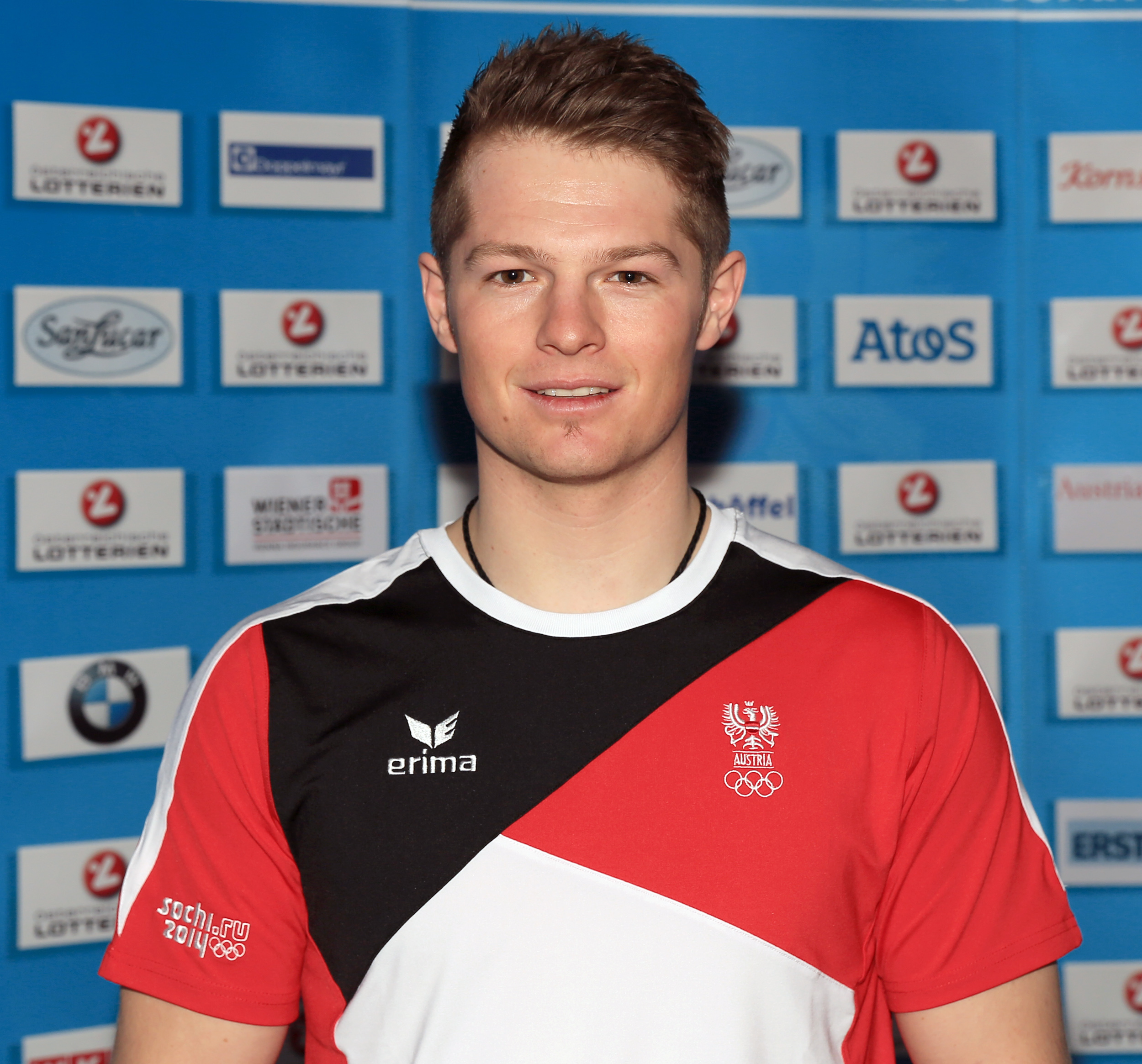
Christoph Wahrstötter

Christoph Wahrstötter (born 10 October 1989) is an Austrian freestyle skier. He was born in Kitzbühel. He competed in ski cross at the World Ski Championships in 2013 (where he failed to qualify missing out by only 0.17 seconds) and 2017 (where he placed 5th), and at the 2014 Winter Olympics in Sochi, in ski-cross.
