= François Place =

French alpine skier (born 1989)

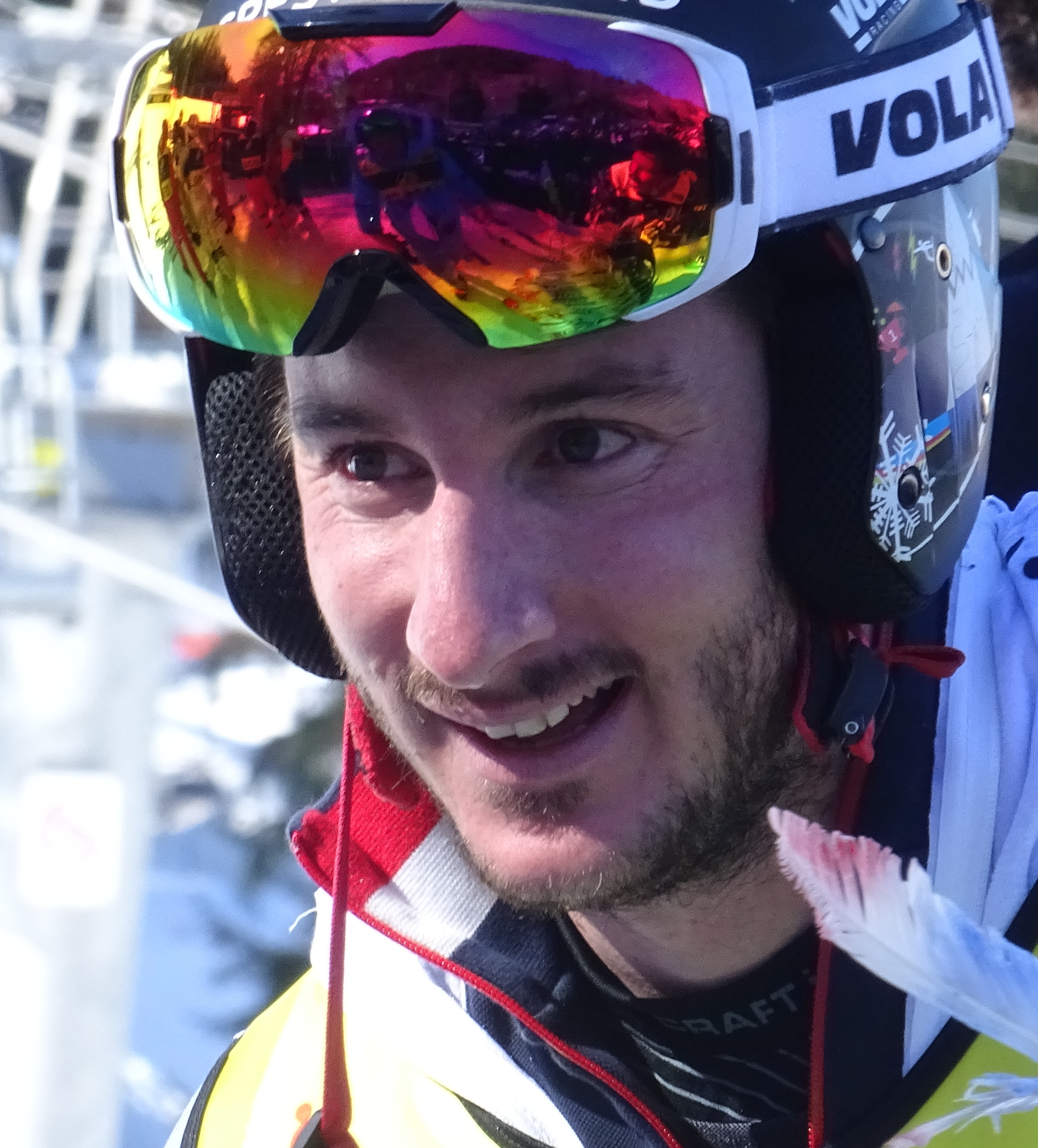
- in 2019

Personal information
- Nationality: French
- Born: 2 July 1989 (age 36) Albertville, France
- Height: 1.85 m (6 ft 1 in)
- Weight: 90 kg (198 lb)

Sport
- Country: France
- Sport: Freestyle skiing
- Event: Ski cross
- Club: SC Crest Voland La Gentiane
Medal record
World Championships
| Gold medal – first place | 2019 Utah | Ski cross |
| Silver medal – second place | 2021 Idre | Ski cross |
| Bronze medal – third place | 2017 Sierra Nevada | Ski cross |

François Place (born 2 July 1989) is a French freestyle skier.

== Career ==
He competed in the 2017 FIS Freestyle World Ski Championships, and in the 2018 Winter Olympics.

He participated at the FIS Freestyle Ski and Snowboarding World Championships 2019, where he won the gold and became World Champion. Two years later in Idre Fjall at the FIS Freestyle Ski and Snowboarding World Championships 2021 Place went on to take silver.
