= Semen Denshchikov =

Russian freestyle skier

Personal information
- Nationality: Russian
- Born: 10 April 1993 (age 32)
- Height: 1.87 m (6 ft 2 in)

Sport
- Sport: Freestyle skiing

Semen Denshchikov (born 10 April 1993) is a Russian freestyle skier. He competed in the 2018 Winter Olympics.
