= Thomas Biesemeyer =

American alpine ski racer

Personal information
- Born: January 30, 1989 (age 37) 01/30/1989 Plattsburgh, New York, United States
- Height: 1.83 m (6 ft 0 in)

Skiing career
- Sport: Alpine skiing
- Disciplines: Super-G
- World Cup debut: November 27, 2010 - (age 21).

Thomas Biesemeyer (born January 30, 1989) is an American alpine ski racer. He started when he was 2 years old. Making his World Cup debut in November 2010, Tommy is considered to be one of America's most promising downhill and super-g alpine ski racers. However, he entered top 30 only in super-g.

He missed one season 2009 due to a knee injury.

== 2010 North American Cup Champion ==
Recovering from knee surgery sustained in 2009, Biesemeyer won the overall NorAM Cup title in 2010 where he finished on the podium in nine separate races. As overall champion Tommy will be eligible to race in all 2011World Cup events.

== U.S. Ski Championships ==
Biesemeyer placed second at the U.S. Alpine Championships in 2010 hosted by Winter Park, Colorado. In this race he finished in second-place by only one-tenth of a second.
