= Jamie Prebble =

New Zealand freestyle skier

Personal information
- Nationality: New Zealand
- Born: 28 May 1991 (age 35)

Sport
- Country: New Zealand
- Sport: Freestyle skiing
- Event: Ski cross
Medal record
Men's freestyle skiing
Representing New Zealand
World Championships
Silver medal – second place	2017 Sierra Nevada	Ski cross

Jamie Prebble (born 28 May 1991) is a New Zealand freestyle skier, specialising in ski cross competitions. He won the silver medal in the ski cross at the 2017 FIS Freestyle World Ski Championships.

On 24 October 2017, he was selected to compete for New Zealand at the 2018 Winter Olympics in Pyeongchang, South Korea.

== International competitions ==
Year	Competition	Venue	Position	Event	Notes
2017	FIS Freestyle World Ski Championships	Sierra Nevada, Spain	2nd	Ski cross	
