= Aleksandr Glebov (skier) =

Russian alpine skier (born 1983)

Aleksandr Glebov (born 15 July 1983) is a Russian alpine skier. He has competed at the 2014 Winter Olympics in Sochi.
