= Stefan Thanei =

Italian alpine skier

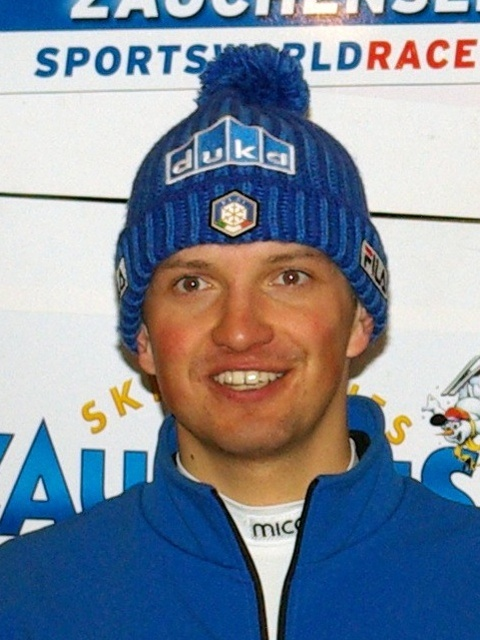
- Thanei in 2007

Personal information
- Born: 3 September 1981 (age 43); Schlanders, South Tyrol, Italy

Sport
- Country: Italy
- Sport: Freestyle skiing
- Event: Ski cross

Stefan Thanei (born 3 September 1981) is an Italian freestyle skier skier.

He competed in the 2013, 2015 and 2017 FIS Freestyle World Ski Championships, and at the 2018 Winter Olympics.
