= Marc Bischofberger =

Swiss freestyle skier

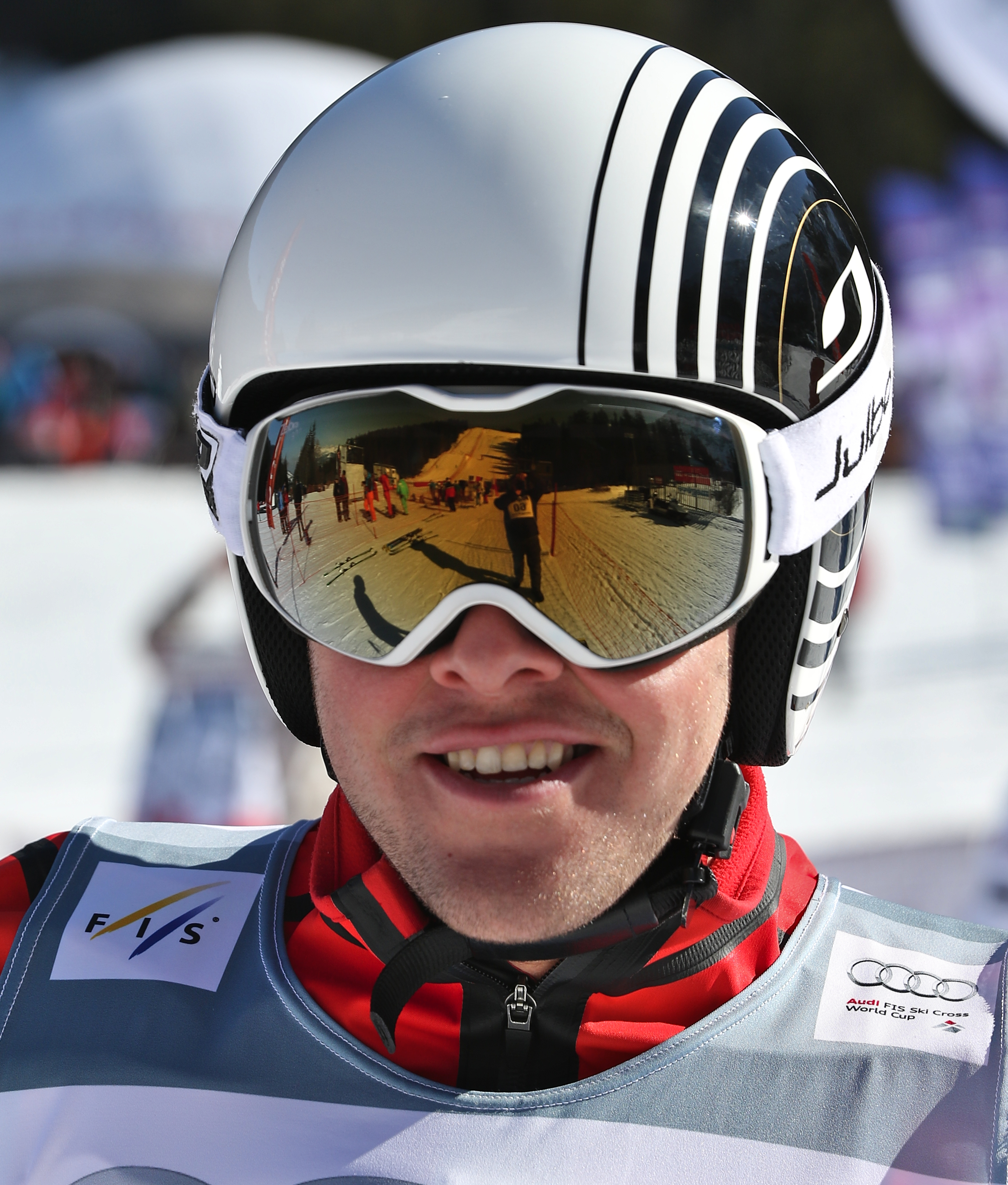
- Marc Bischofberger in 2015

Personal information
- Nationality: Swiss
- Born: 26 January 1991 (age 35)

Sport
- Country: Switzerland
- Sport: Freestyle skiing
- Event: Ski Cross
Medal record
Olympic Games
Silver medal – second place	2018 Pyeongchang	Ski cross

Marc Bischofberger (born 26 January 1991) is a Swiss freestyle skier competing in ski cross discipline.

== Career ==
He finished 16th at the 2015 World Championships and 10th at the 2017 World Championships. He then won the silver medal at the 2018 Olympic Games.

He made his World Cup debut in March 2013 in Åre. He recorded his first top-10 in December 2013, when finishing seventh in Innichen, and won his first World Cup event in January 2015 in Val Thorens.
