= Kevin Drury =

Canadian freestyle skier (born 1988)

Personal information
- Nationality: Canadian
- Born: 20 July 1988 (age 37) Toronto, Ontario
- Height: 1.71 m (5 ft 7 in)
- Weight: 82 kg (181 lb)

Sport
- Country: Canada
- Sport: Freestyle skiing
- Event: Ski cross
Medal record
World Championships
Bronze medal – third place	2019 Utah	Ski cross

Kevin Drury (born July 20, 1988) is a Canadian freestyle skier who competes internationally. He represented Canada at the 2018, 2022, and 2026 Winter Olympics.

== Career ==
He represented Canada at the 2018 Winter Olympics, where he placed 4th in Men's ski cross.

He is the current World Cup Overall champion. Drury competed as an alpine skier for the University of Vermont Catamounts ski team from 2009 to 2014, where he was a two-time All-American selection and national runner-up in the giant slalom at the 2011 NCAA Championships.
