= Martin Khuber =

Kazakhstani alpine skier (born 1992)

Personal information
- Born: 23 January 1992 (age 34) Almaty, Kazakhstan
- Height: 1.85 m (6 ft 1 in)
- Weight: 97 kg (214 lb)

Sport
- Country: Kazakhstan
- Sport: Alpine skiing

Martin Khuber (born 23 January 1992 in Almaty, Kazakhstan) is an alpine skier from Kazakhstan. He competed for Kazakhstan at the 2014 Winter Olympics in the alpine skiing events.
