= Jonas Lenherr =

Swiss freestyle skier

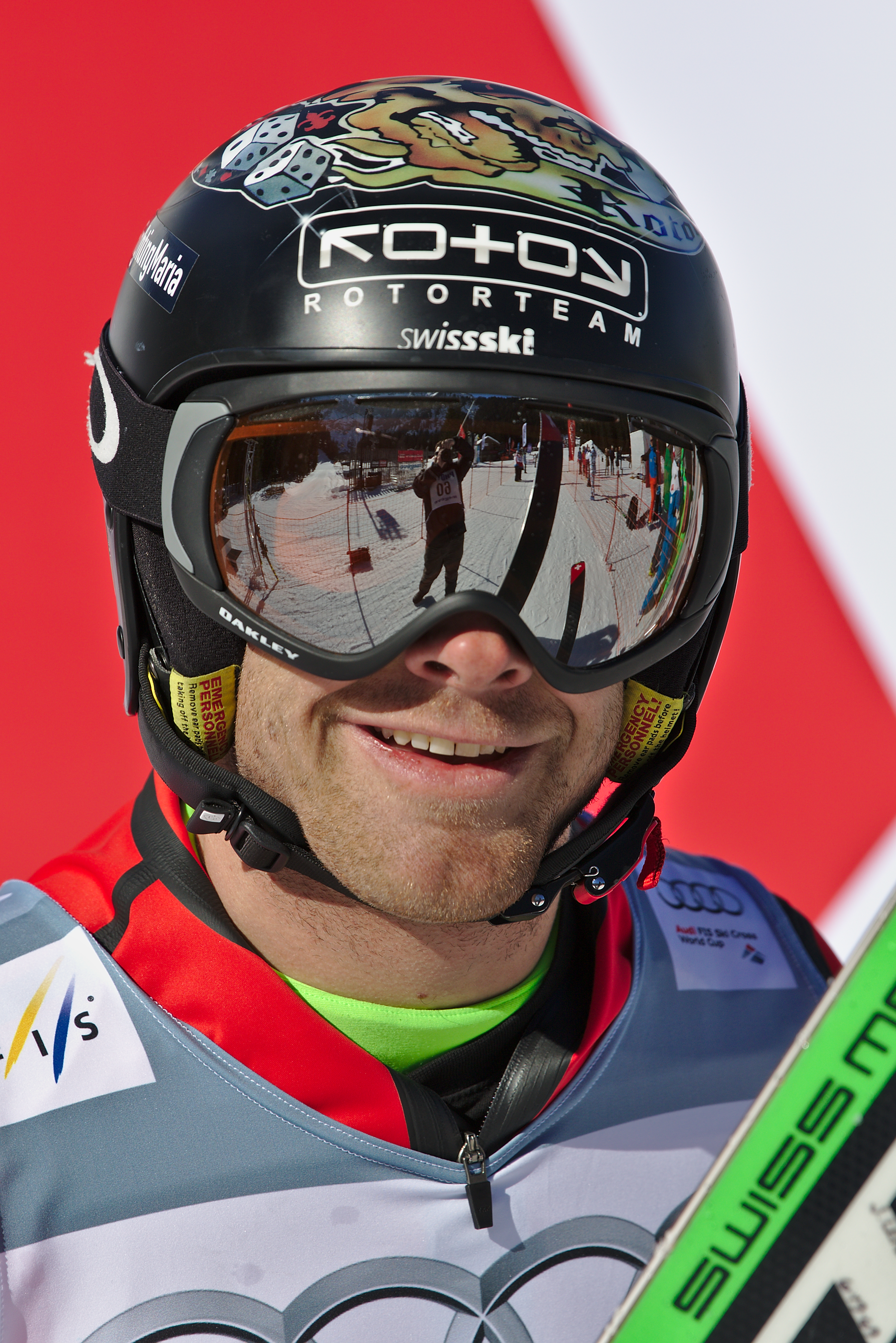

Personal information
- Born: 24 March 1989 (age 36)

Sport
- Country: Switzerland
- Sport: Freestyle skiing
- Event: Ski cross

Jonas Lenherr (born 24 March 1989) is a Swiss freestyle skier.

== Biography ==
Born on 24 March 1989, Lenherr competed in the 2017 FIS Freestyle World Ski Championships, and in the 2018 Winter Olympics.

He competed in the FIS Ski Cross World Cup since the 2014/2015 season, achieving his first podiums in the 2015–16 FIS Freestyle Skiing World Cup.
