= Viktor Andersson (skier) =

Swedish freestyle skier

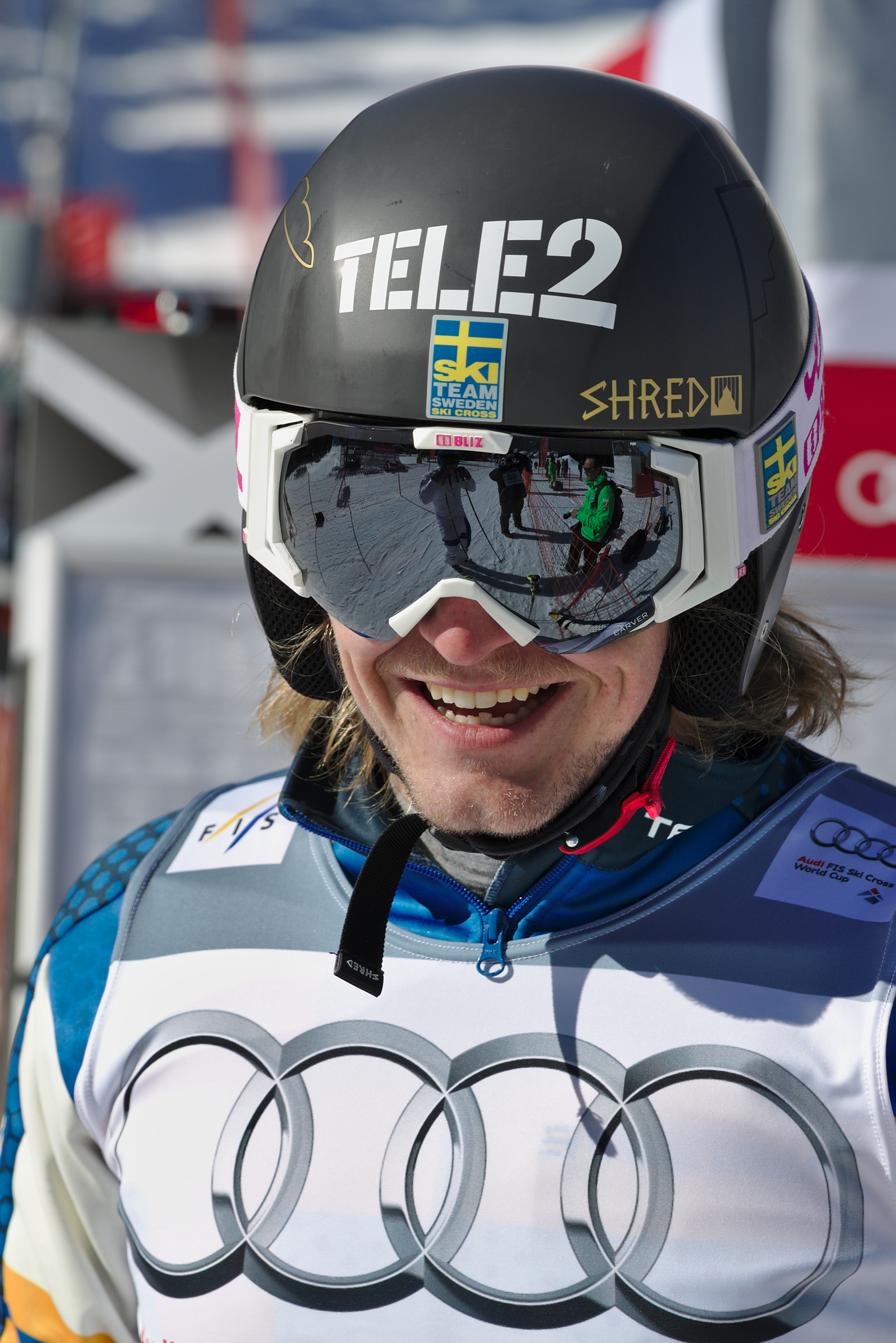
- Viktor Andersson during World CUp competitions in Megève, Switzerland in March 2015

Personal information
- Nationality: Swedish
- Born: 6 November 1992 (age 33) Lofsdalen, Sweden
- Height: 1.86 m (6 ft 1 in)

Sport
- Sport: Freestyle skiing

Viktor Andersson (born 6 November 1992) is a Swedish freestyle skier. He competed at the 2018 and 2022 Winter Olympics.

On 31 March 2022, he announced his retirement from skicross.
