= Paul Eckert =

German freestyle skier (born 1990)

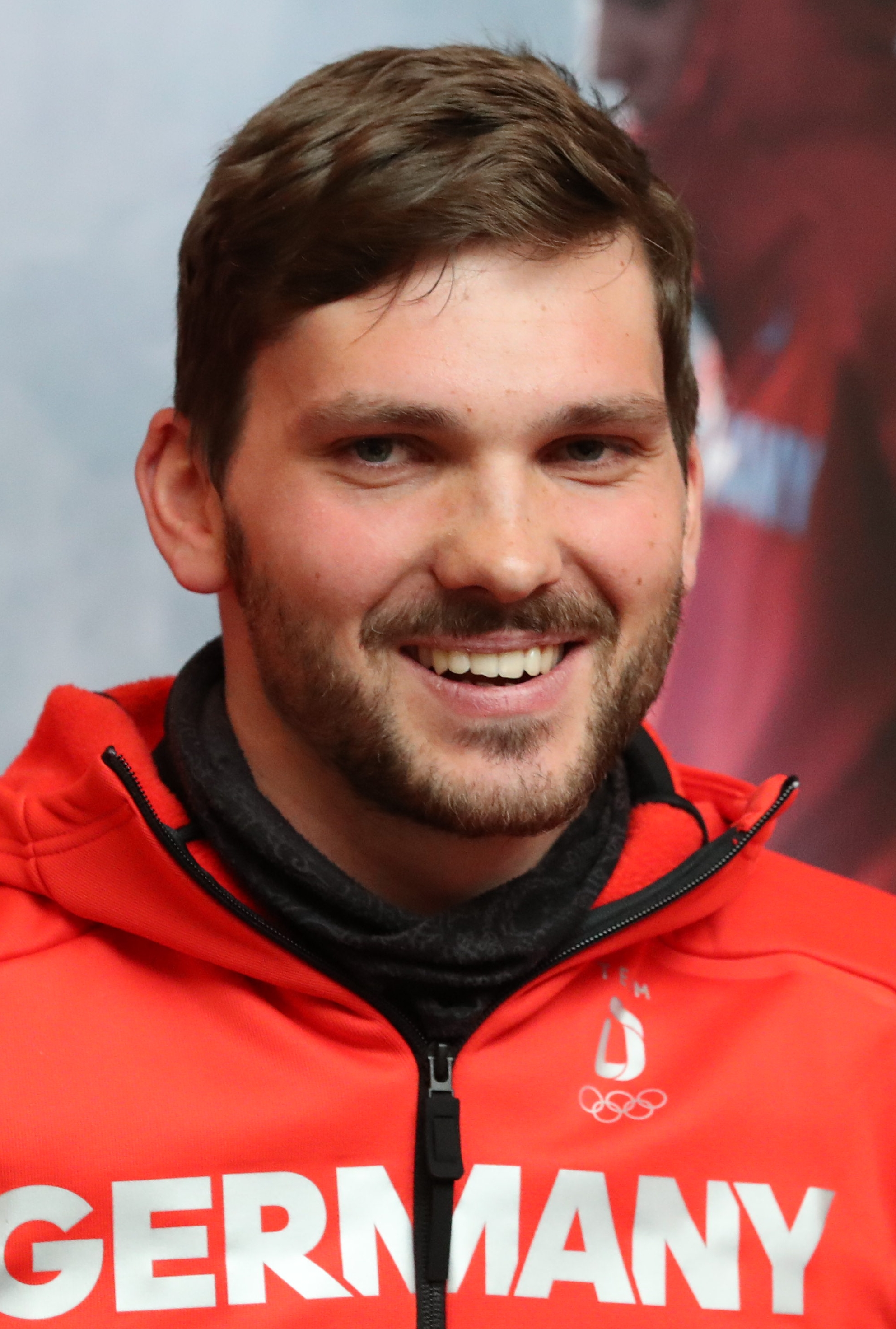
- Eckert in 2018

Personal information
- Nationality: German
- Born: 9 September 1990 (age 34); Prien am Chiemsee
- Height: 176 cm (5 ft 9 in)

Sport
- Sport: Freestyle skiing

Paul Eckert (born 9 September 1990) is a German freestyle skier. He competed in the 2018 Winter Olympics.
