= Adam Kappacher =

Austrian freestyle skier

Personal information
- Born: 15 December 1993 (age 32) Schwarzach, Austria
- Height: 171 cm (5 ft 7 in)

Sport
- Country: Austria
- Sport: Freestyle skiing
- Event: Ski cross

Adam Kappacher (born 15 December 1993) is an Austrian freestyle skier. He is a three-time Winter Olympian (2018, 2022, 2026) and competed in the 2017 FIS Freestyle World Ski Championships.
