= FIS Alpine World Ski Championships 2015 – Men's super combined =

Men's super combined at the FIS Alpine World Ski Championships 2015
- Venue: Birds of Prey; Beaver Creek, Colorado, U.S.
- Date: February 8, 2015
- Competitors: 47 from 21 nations
- Winning time: 2:36.10

Medalists
| gold medal | Marcel Hirscher | Austria |
| silver medal | Kjetil Jansrud | Norway |
| bronze medal | Ted Ligety | United States |

The Men's super combined competition at the 2015 World Championships was held on Sunday, February 8.

Marcel Hirscher won the gold medal, despite originally finishing in 31st position after the downhill leg. Ondřej Bank however, fell on the final jump and, although the original results had Bank in 25th place, the jury disqualified him after the run ended and as a result, Hirscher was able to start first in the slalom leg instead of starting after the top 30. With a clean track he was able to rise all the way from 30th to 1st. Kjetil Jansrud took silver for Norway after leading the downhill leg. Bronze medalist Ted Ligety commenting on the race conditions and result, said, "It was dumb luck. If I was a half-second faster in the downhill, I wouldn’t have been able to get a medal at all. That’s how big of a difference I thought running early was."

== Results ==
The downhill run was started at 10:00 MST and the slalom run at 14:15.

| Rank | Bib | Name | Nation | Downhill | Rank | Slalom | Rank | Total | Diff |
|---|---|---|---|---|---|---|---|---|---|
| 1st place, gold medalist(s) | 9 | Marcel Hirscher | Austria | 1:46.17 | 30 | 49.93 | 1 | 2:36.10 | |
| 2nd place, silver medalist(s) | 13 | Kjetil Jansrud | Norway | 1:43.01 | 1 | 53.28 | 17 | 2:36.29 | +0.19 |
| 3rd place, bronze medalist(s) | 20 | Ted Ligety | United States | 1:46.04 | 29 | 50.36 | 2 | 2:36.40 | +0.30 |
| 4 | 12 | Romed Baumann | Austria | 1:43.70 | 4 | 52.78 | 16 | 2:36.48 | +0.38 |
| 5 | 21 | Alexis Pinturault | France | 1:45.65 | 23 | 50.86 | 3 | 2:36.51 | +0.41 |
| 6 | 22 | Carlo Janka | Switzerland | 1:44.18 | 6 | 52.62 | 14 | 2:36.80 | +0.70 |
| 7 | 23 | Andreas Romar | Finland | 1:44.96 | 18 | 51.97 | 5 | 2:36.93 | +0.83 |
| 8 | 39 | Aleksander Aamodt Kilde | Norway | 1:44.53 | 11 | 52.43 | 12 | 2:36.96 | +0.86 |
| 9 | 10 | Thomas Mermillod Blondin | France | 1:44.89 | 16 | 52.10 | 8 | 2:36.99 | +0.89 |
| 10 | 25 | Dominik Paris | Italy | 1:44.75 | 14 | 52.38 | 11 | 2:37.13 | +1.03 |
| 11 | 8 | Matthias Mayer | Austria | 1:43.75 | 5 | 53.39 | 19 | 2:37.14 | +1.04 |
| 12 | 17 | Ivica Kostelić | Croatia | 1:46.03 | 28 | 51.12 | 4 | 2:37.15 | +1.05 |
| 13 | 11 | Mauro Caviezel | Switzerland | 1:44.92 | 17 | 52.25 | 10 | 2:37.17 | +1.07 |
| 14 | 29 | Beat Feuz | Switzerland | 1:43.10 | 2 | 54.37 | 29 | 2:37.27 | +1.17 |
| 15 | 4 | Silvan Zurbriggen | Switzerland | 1:45.24 | 22 | 52.05 | 7 | 2:37.29 | +1.19 |
| 16 | 2 | Klemen Kosi | Slovenia | 1:45.18 | 20 | 52.58 | 13 | 2:37.76 | +1.66 |
| 17 | 24 | Tim Jitloff | United States | 1:46.01 | 28 | 52.12 | 9 | 2:38.13 | +2.03 |
| 18 | 14 | Christof Innerhofer | Italy | 1:44.31 | 8 | 53.99 | 24 | 2:38.30 | +2.20 |
| 19 | 15 | Adam Žampa | Slovakia | 1:46.37 | 33 | 51.97 | 5 | 2:38.34 | +2.24 |
| 20 | 3 | Martin Cater | Slovenia | 1:44.74 | 13 | 53.63 | 21 | 2:38.37 | +2.27 |
| 21 | 38 | Steven Nyman | United States | 1:44.64 | 12 | 53.89 | 23 | 2:38.53 | +2.43 |
| 22 | 6 | Andrew Weibrecht | United States | 1:44.31 | 8 | 54.26 | 27 | 2:38.57 | +2.47 |
| 23 | 34 | Andreas Sander | Germany | 1:44.28 | 7 | 55.01 | 32 | 2:39.29 | +3.19 |
| 24 | 33 | Pavel Trikhichev | Russia | 1:46.23 | 32 | 53.30 | 18 | 2:39.33 | +3.23 |
| 25 | 27 | Josef Ferstl | Germany | 1:45.21 | 21 | 54.34 | 28 | 2:39.55 | +3.45 |
| 26 | 30 | Kryštof Krýzl | Czech Republic | 1:47.02 | 38 | 52.74 | 15 | 2:39.76 | +3.66 |
| 27 | 1 | Maciej Bydliński | Poland | 1:46.42 | 34 | 54.12 | 25 | 2:40.54 | +4.44 |
| 28 | 42 | Max Ullrich | Croatia | 1:46.55 | 35 | 54.73 | 30 | 2:41.28 | +5.18 |
| 29 | 5 | Jared Goldberg | United States | 1:43.69 | 3 | 57.63 | 37 | 2:41.32 | +5.22 |
| 30 | 26 | Martin Vráblík | Czech Republic | 1:48.41 | 40 | 53.63 | 21 | 2:42.04 | +5.94 |
| 31 | 48 | Christoffer Faarup | Denmark | 1:46.94 | 37 | 56.03 | 33 | 2:42.97 | +6.87 |
| 32 | 7 | Matteo Marsaglia | Italy | 1:44.76 | 15 | 58.47 | 38 | 2:43.23 | +7.13 |
| 32 | 45 | Henrik von Appen | Chile | 1:46.86 | 36 | 56.37 | 36 | 2:43.23 | +7.13 |
| 34 | 44 | Arnaud Alessandria | Monaco | 1:47.45 | 39 | 56.03 | 33 | 2:43.48 | +7.38 |
| 35 | 31 | Cristian Javier Simari Birkner | Argentina | 1:49.82 | 43 | 54.14 | 26 | 2:43.96 | +7.86 |
| 36 | 36 | Istok Rodeš | Croatia | 1:50.73 | 46 | 53.56 | 20 | 2:44.29 | +8.19 |
| 37 | 41 | Willis Feasey | New Zealand | 1:48.71 | 41 | 56.03 | 35 | 2:44.74 | +8.64 |
| 38 | 28 | Maxence Muzaton | France | 1:44.50 | 10 | 1:00.83 | 39 | 2:45.33 | +9.23 |
| 39 | 46 | Andreas Žampa | Slovakia | 1:50.58 | 45 | 54.91 | 31 | 2:45.49 | +9.39 |
| | 18 | Natko Zrnčić-Dim | Croatia | 1:45.72 | 24 | DNF | | | |
| | 32 | Morgan Pridy | Canada | 1:45.14 | 19 | DNF | | | |
| | 35 | Otmar Striedinger | Austria | 1:45.92 | 25 | DNF | | | |
| | 40 | Igor Zakurdayev | Kazakhstan | 1:49.80 | 42 | DNF | | | |
| | 43 | Nick Prebble | New Zealand | 1:50.11 | 44 | DNF | | | |
| | 37 | Boštjan Kline | Slovenia | 1:45.99 | 26 | DQ | | | |
| | 47 | Marvin van Heek | Netherlands | DNS | | | | | |
| | 49 | Ioan Valeriu Achiriloaie | Romania | DNS | | | | | |
| | 16 | Victor Muffat-Jeandet | France | DNF | | | | | |
| | 19 | Ondřej Bank | Czech Republic | DQ | | | | | |
