= Igor Omelin =

Russian freestyle skier

Personal information
- Full name: Igor Yuryevich Omelin
- Nationality: Russian
- Born: 30 August 1995 (age 30) Asha, Chelyabinsk Oblast, Russia
- Height: 1.80 m (5 ft 11 in)

Sport
- Sport: Freestyle skiing

Igor Yuryevich Omelin (Russian: Игорь Юрьевич Омелин, born 30 August 1995) is a Russian freestyle skier.

== Career ==
He competed at the 2018 Winter Olympics and came second in the Ski Cross World Cup. He participated in the men's ski cross.
