= Max Ullrich =

Croatian alpine skier (born 1994)

Personal information
- Born: 1994 (age 31–32)

Skiing career
- Sport: Alpine skiing

Max Ullrich (born 1994) is a Croatian alpine ski racer.

He competed at the 2015 World Championships in Beaver Creek, USA, in the Super-G.

His family owns the Ullrich gallery in Zagreb, which is the oldest gallery in the city.
