= Michał Kłusak =

Polish alpine skier (born 1990)

Personal information
- Nationality: Polish
- Born: 20 July 1990 (age 34); Zakopane, Poland

Sport
- Sport: Alpine skiing

Michał Kłusak (born 20 July 1990) is a Polish alpine skier. He competed in the 2018 Winter Olympics.
