= Siegmar Klotz =

Italian alpine skier

Personal information
- Born: 28 October 1987 (age 37); Meran, South Tyrol, Italy

Sport
- Country: Italy
- Sport: Freestyle skiing
- Event: Ski cross

Siegmar Klotz (born 28 October 1987) is an Italian freestyle skier. He competed in the 2017 FIS Freestyle World Ski Championships, and in the 2018 Winter Olympics.
