= Rostyslav Feshchuk =

Ukrainian alpine skier (born 1990)

Personal information
- Full name: Rostyslav Feshchuk
- Born: 1 May 1990 (age 36) Kiev, Ukraine

Sport
- Sport: Skiing
- Updated on February 10, 2013

Rostyslav Feshchuk (born May 1, 1990) is an alpine skier from Ukraine. He competed for Ukraine at the 2010 Winter Olympics. His best result was a 39th place in the slalom.

== Performances ==
Level	Year	Event	SL	GS	SG	DH	SC	T
JWSC	2008	Formigal, Spain	42	52	60	63	18	
AWSC	2009	Val d'Isère, France	45	71	46			
OLY	2010	Whistler, Canada	39	68				
AWSC	2011	Garmisch-Partenkirchen, Germany	DNF1	90	40	44	25	
AWSC	2013	Schladming, Austria	DNF1	BDNS1	60	44	26	
