= Roberts Rode =

Latvian alpine skier (born 1987)

Roberts Rode (born 29 May 1987 in Riga) is an alpine skier from Latvia. He competed for Latvia at the 2010 Winter Olympics. His best finish was a 58th place in the downhill.
