= Kandahar (ski course) =

Ski course in Bavaria, Germany

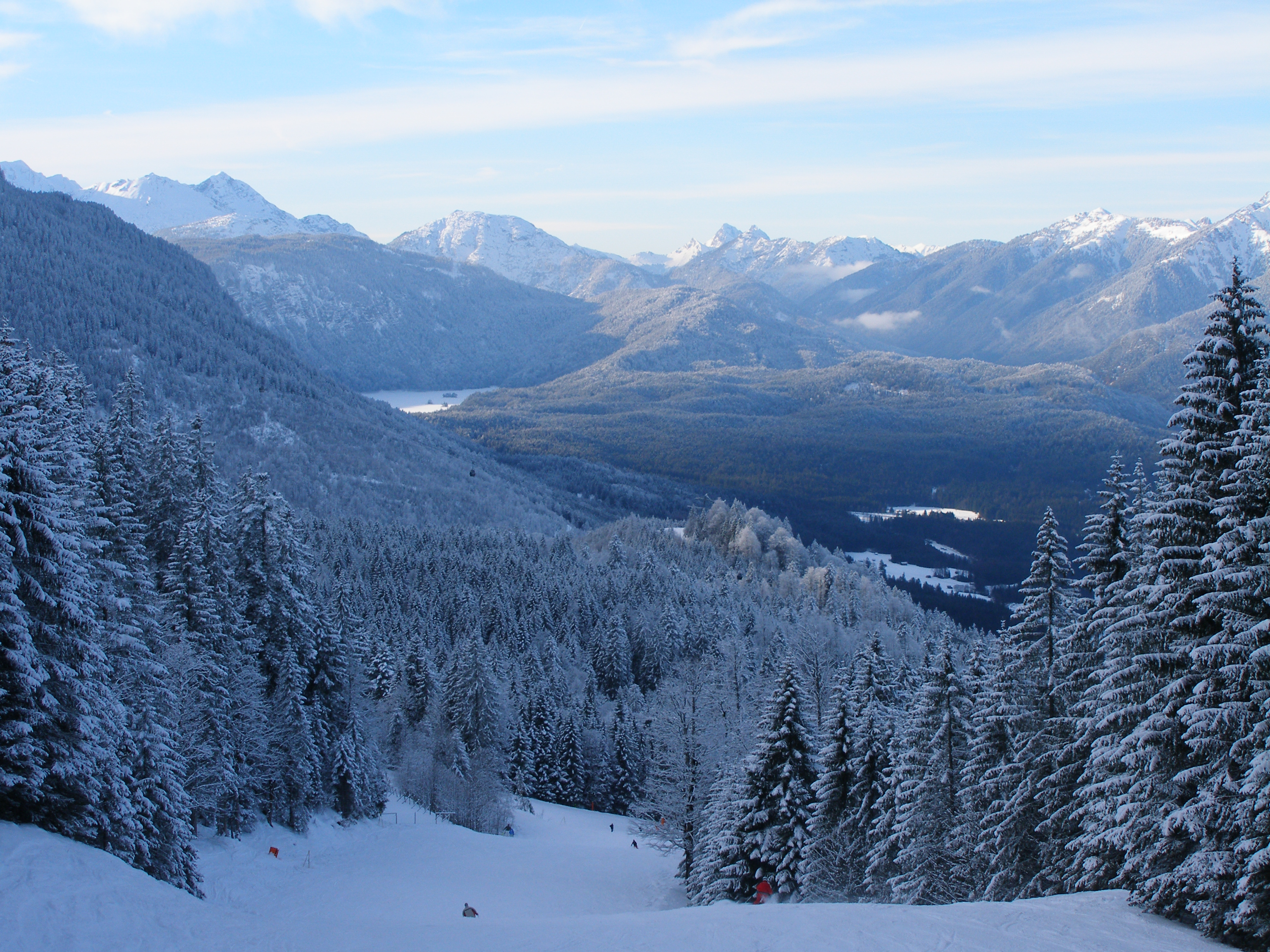
- Interactive map of Kandahar
- Location within Germany Location within Alps Location within Europe
- 47°28′06″N 11°03′49″E
- Location: Bavaria, Germany
- Mountain: Kreuzeck / Zugspitze; Garmisch Classic
- Opened: 1936 (Kandahar 1); 2009 (Kandahar 2)
- Member: Club5+
- Competition: Arlberg-Kandahar races

Downhill Kandahar 1 (women's)
- Start: 1,490 m (4,888 ft) (AA)
- Finish: 770 m (2,526 ft)
- Vertical drop: 720 m (2,362 ft)
- Length: 2.810 km (1.75 mi)
- Max incline: 40.4 degrees (85%)
- Most Wins (M): (Switzerland) Roland Collombin (3x) (Canada) Steve Podborski (3x)
- Most Wins (W): (United States) Lindsey Vonn (5x)

Downhill Kandahar 2 (men's)
- Start: 1,690 m (5,545 ft) (AA)
- Finish: 770 m (2,526 ft)
- Vertical drop: 920 m (3,018 ft)
- Length: 3.300 km (2.05 mi)
- Max incline: 42.6 degrees (92%)

Kandahar is a classic World Cup downhill ski course in Bavaria, Germany, opened in 1936. It is located at the Garmisch Classic ski area on the Zugspitze, above Garmisch-Partenkirchen.

Since 1954, the competition called Arlberg-Kandahar races have been held here, which is rotating with other notable downhill ski courses in Austria, Switzerland, France, and Italy.

In 2009, the new "Kandahar 2" course opened, parallel to the original, which became "Kandahar 1". With a max. incline of 42.6 degrees (92%), it has the 2nd steepest gradient on the World Cup circuit.

== Kandahar 1 ==
=== The name origin ===
The course was named after Sir Frederick Roberts, a British Victorian era major general who was known as "Baron of Kandahar", who led the Kabul Field Force in the Second Anglo-Afghan War and defeated Ayub Khan at the Battle of Kandahar in southern Afghanistan. The Kandahar Ski Club of Mürren, Switzerland, was founded by Arnold Lunn and other British skiers in early 1924.

=== Women's course ===
The original Kandahar 1 course was built for the Olympic debut of alpine skiing in 1936. Since 2009, it is used only for women's World Cup speed events, as a new parallel, more demanding "Kandahar 2" downhill ski course opened for the men's events.

The Kandahar 1 course starts on "Tröglhang" at 1,490 m (4,888 ft) (AA), and follows mainly the old men's route. After the "Schußanger" with two curves, "Himmelreich" jump follows where the Super-G start is located, then "Bödele". Then comes the "Waldeck" with 85% gradient, the steepest section in women's circuit and a technically very demanding traverse. From 2009, course from there continues by newly built route where also giant slalom starts; the "Eishang" is bypassed by via the "Ramwiesen" and via the "Höllentor" it returns to the original Kandahar in "Hölle", the steep section. Then passing the "FIS Schneise", a sloping run that, after a hard left-hand bend, ends in the men's course just before the "Tauber-Schuss".

Federica Brignone won the most recent downhill in late January 2025; the full course was used at 2.810 km (1.75 mi) in length, with a vertical drop of 770 m (2,526 ft) from a starting elevation of 1,490 m (4,888 ft). Her winning time of 95.83 seconds yielded an average speed of 105.562 km/h (65.6 mph) and an average vertical descent rate of 7.513 m/s (24.6 ft/s).

=== K1 course sections ===
- Tröglhang
- Olympia-Kurve
- Panorama-Sprung
- Schußanger
- Himmelreich
- Alte Quelle
- Bödele
- Waldeck (85%)
- Ramwiesen
- Höllentor
- Hölle
- FIS Schneise
- Tauberschuss
- Finish

== Kandahar 2 ==
=== Men's course ===
A new downhill run for men in 2009, "Kandahar 2" shares the same start and finish with the original course. It begins at the original start at 1,690 m (5,545 ft) (AA) on Kreuzjoch mountain, reaching speed up to 100 km/h (62 mph) after the "S-Kurve". After the "Tröglhang", the steepest section until 2008, the course continues into newly built route in 2009 to "Olympia-Kurve" and then to "Panorama-Sprung".

After that comes the "Alte Quelle", before the route at the "Bödele" returns into the original Kandahar to the start of the giant slalom above "Eishang" and after the cable car jump (40 to 60 m (130 to 195 ft)), the racers turn right into the second newly designed part at the "Kramersprung" (20 to 40 m (65 to 130 ft)). Then to the next newly section called "Padöls" and into "Auf der Mauer" flat passage. Next is "Frei Fall", with 92% incline, the absolute steepest section in this competition. At the end, last couple of hundred metres, routes joins with the old original course into the "Tauber-Schuss" and a twenty-metre (65 ft) jump just before the finish line.

Marco Odermatt won the most recent downhill in late February 2026; the full course was used at 3.300 km (2.05 mi) in length, with a vertical drop of 920 m (3,018 ft) from a starting elevation of 1,690 m (5,545 ft). His winning time of 107.57 seconds yielded an average speed of 110.439 km/h (68.6 mph) and an average vertical descent rate of 8.553 m/s (28.1 ft/s).

=== K2 course sections ===
- Starthang
- S-kurve
- Tröglhang
- Olympia-Kurve
- Panorama-Sprung
- Schußanger
- Himmelreich
- Alte Quelle
- Bödele
- Eishang
- Seilbahnsprung
- Kramersprung
- Padöls
- Auf der Mauer
- Freier Fall (92%)
- Tauberschuss
- Finish

== Olympics ==
=== Men's events ===
Event	Type	Date	Gold	Silver	Bronze
1936	KB	7–9 February 1936	(Norway) Birger Ruud	(Nazi Germany) Franz Pfnür	(Nazi Germany) Gustav Lantschner

=== Women's events ===
Event	Type	Date	Gold	Silver	Bronze
1936	KB	7–8 February 1936	(Norway) Laila Schou Nilsen	(Nazi Germany) Lisa Resch	(Nazi Germany) Käthe Grasegger

Combined (both downhills held on "Kandahar" and both slaloms on "Gudiberg" course.)

== World Championships ==
=== Men's events ===
Event	Type	Date	Gold	Silver	Bronze
1978	DH	29 January 1978	(Austria) Josef Walcher	(West Germany) Michael Veith	(Austria) Werner Grissmann
1978	KB	(DH) 29 January 1978 (GS) 2 February 1978 (SL) 5 February 1978	(Liechtenstein) Andreas Wenzel	(West Germany) Sepp Ferstl	(United States) Pete Patterson
2011	SG	9 February 2011	(Italy) Christof Innerhofer	(Austria) Hannes Reichelt	(Croatia) Ivica Kostelić
2011	DH	12 February 2011	(Canada) Erik Guay	(Switzerland) Didier Cuche	(Italy) Christof Innerhofer
2011	SC	14 February 2011	(Norway) Aksel Lund Svindal	(Italy) Christof Innerhofer	(Italy) Peter Fill
2011	GS	18 February 2011	(United States) Ted Ligety	(France) Cyprien Richard	(Austria) Philipp Schörghofer

=== Women's events ===
Event	Type	Date	Gold	Silver	Bronze
2011	SG	8 February 2011	(Austria) Elisabeth Görgl	(United States) Julia Mancuso	(Germany) Maria Riesch
2011	SC	11 February 2011	(Norway) Anna Fenninger	(Slovenia) Tina Maze	(Sweden) Anja Pärson
2011	DH	13 February 2011	(Austria) Elisabeth Görgl	(United States) Lindsey Vonn	(Germany) Maria Riesch
2011	GS	17 February 2011	(Slovenia) Tina Maze	(Italy) Federica Brignone	(France) Tessa Worley

=== Team event ===
Event	Type	Date	Gold	Silver	Bronze
2011	PG	16 February 2011	France Taïna Barioz; Anémone Marmottan; Tessa Worley; Thomas Fanara; Cyprien Richard; Gauthier de Tessières	Austria Anna Fenninger; Michaela Kirchgasser; Marlies Schild; Romed Baumann; Benjamin Raich; Philipp Schörghofer	Sweden Sara Hector; Anja Pärson; Maria Pietilä-Holmner; Axel Bäck; Hans Olsson; Matts Olsson

- Men's combined in 1978 (SL and GS held on other courses counted together with DH for combined result.)
- Men's and women's super combined in 2011 (both slaloms held on "Gudiberg" course.)

== World Cup ==
The World Cup circuit debuted in January 1967.

Gen. Frederick Roberts	Roland Collombin	Steve Podborski	Christoph Gruber
300x	300x	300x	300x
"Baron of Kandahar" (course is named after him)	won record 3 downhills	won record 3 downhills	won record 3 super-Gs

Hermann Maier	Lindsey Vonn	Lara Gut-Behrami
300x	300x	300x
won record 3 super-Gs and record 5 events in total	won record 5 downhills and record 8 events in total	won record 4 super-Gs

=== Men ===
No.	Type	Season	Date	Winner	Second	Third
"Kandahar 1" (old course)
FIS–A
	DH	1954	1954	(Austria) Ernst Oberaigner	N/A	N/A
	KB	1954	1954	(Austria) Anderl Molterer	N/A	N/A
	DH	1959	7 February 1959	(Austria) Karl Schranz	(Switzerland) Roger Staub	N/A
	KB	1959	1959	(Austria) Karl Schranz	N/A	N/A
	GS	1964	1964	(France) Jean-Claude Killy	N/A	N/A
	KB	1964	1964	(United States) Jimmie Heuga	N/A	N/A
World Cup
	DH	1969/70	31 January 1970	rescheduled on the next day due to strong fog		
76	DH	1969/70	1 February 1970	(Austria) Karl Schranz	(Austria) Karl Cordin	(West Germany) Franz Vogler
138	DH	1972/73	6 January 1973	(Switzerland) Roland Collombin	(Switzerland) Philippe Roux (Italy) Marcello Varallo	
139	DH	1972/73	7 January 1973	(Switzerland) Roland Collombin	(Italy) Marcello Varallo	(Switzerland) Bernhard Russi
164	DH	1973/74	6 January 1974	(Switzerland) Roland Collombin	(Austria) Franz Klammer	(Italy) Herbert Plank
183	DH	1974/75	5 January 1975	(Austria) Franz Klammer	(Austria) Werner Grissmann	(Austria) Josef Walcher
237	DH	1976/77	8 January 1977	(Austria) Franz Klammer	(Austria) Ernst Winkler	(Austria) Peter Wirnsberger
238	GS	1976/77	9 January 1977	(Austria) Klaus Heidegger	(Switzerland) Heini Hemmi	(Liechtenstein) Willi Frommelt
304	DH	1978/79	27 January 1979	(Austria) Peter Wirnsberger	(Austria) Uli Spieß	(Italy) Herbert Plank
306	KB	1978/79	28 January 1979	(Switzerland) Peter Lüscher	(United States) Phil Mahre	(Liechtenstein) Andreas Wenzel
354	DH	1980/81	10 January 1981	(Canada) Steve Podborski	(Switzerland) Peter Müller	(Austria) Harti Weirather
356	KB	1980/81	6 January 1981; 10 January 1981	(United States) Phil Mahre	(Switzerland) Peter Müller	(Liechtenstein) Andreas Wenzel
401	DH	1981/82	13 February 1982	(Canada) Steve Podborski	(Switzerland) Conradin Cathomen	(Austria) Harti Weirather
403	KB	1981/82	14 February 1982	(United States) Steve Mahre	(France) Michel Vion	(Switzerland) Peter Lüscher
437	SG	1982/83	9 February 1983	(Switzerland) Peter Lüscher	(Switzerland) Pirmin Zurbriggen	(Austria) Hans Enn
472	DH	1983/84	28 February 1984	(Canada) Steve Podborski	(Austria) Erwin Resch	(Austria) Franz Klammer
473	SG	1983/84	29 February 1984	(Liechtenstein) Andreas Wenzel	(Switzerland) Pirmin Zurbriggen	(Austria) Hans Enn
474	KB	1983/84	28 February 1984; 29 February 1984	(Switzerland) Pirmin Zurbriggen	(Liechtenstein) Andreas Wenzel	(Switzerland) Peter Müller
510	DH	1984/85	26 February 1985	(Austria) Helmut Höflehner	(Switzerland) Peter Müller	(Austria) Anton Steiner
511	SG	1984/85	27 February 1985	(Luxembourg) Marc Girardelli	(Liechtenstein) Andreas Wenzel	(West Germany) Hans Stuffer
512	KB	1984/85	26 February 1985; 27 February 1985	(Switzerland) Peter Müller	(Switzerland) Peter Lüscher	(Switzerland) Franz Heinzer
583	DH	1986/87	10 January 1987	(Switzerland) Pirmin Zurbriggen	(Italy) Michael Mair	(Switzerland) Peter Müller
584	SG	1986/87	11 January 1987	(West Germany) Markus Wasmeier	(Switzerland) Pirmin Zurbriggen	(Italy) Alberto Ghidoni
709	DH	1990/91	5 January 1991	(Switzerland) Daniel Mahrer	(Norway) Atle Skårdal (Germany) Hannes Zehentner	
710	SG	1990/91	6 January 1991	(Austria) Günther Mader	(Switzerland) Franz Heinzer	(Luxembourg) Marc Girardelli
738	DH	1991/92	11 January 1992	(Germany) Markus Wasmeier	(Austria) Patrick Ortlieb	(Germany) Hansjörg Tauscher
739	SG	1991/92	12 January 1992	(Italy) Patrick Holzer	(Switzerland) Paul Accola	(Austria) Peter Rzehak
741	KB	1991/92	11 January 1992; 13 January 1992	(Switzerland) Paul Accola	(Norway) Ole Kristian Furuseth	(Austria) Hubert Strolz
	DH	1992/93	8 January 1993	recheduled DH from Val d'Isere cancelled; moved to 11 January		
	DH	1992/93	9 January 1993	original DH (9.1.) program switched with SL (10.1.) due to weather		
772	DH	1992/93	10 January 1993	(Switzerland) Franz Heinzer	(Italy) Pietro Vitalini	(Austria) Günther Mader
773	KB	1992/93	9 January 1993; 10 January 1993	(Luxembourg) Marc Girardelli	(Norway) Kjetil André Aamodt	(Austria) Günther Mader
774	DH	1992/93	11 January 1993	(Switzerland) Daniel Mahrer	(Austria) Peter Rzehak	(Switzerland) Franz Heinzer
888	DH	1995/96	2 February 1996	(France) Luc Alphand	(Canada) Brian Stemmle	(Italy) Peter Runggaldier
	DH	1995/96	3 February 1996	moved to Monday on 5 February due to weather		
	SG	1995/96	4 February 1996	moved to Monday on 5 February due to weather		
	DH	1995/96	5 February 1996	double programm; morning DH cancelled due to TV broadcast problems		
889	SG	1995/96	5 February 1996	(Italy) Werner Perathoner	(France) Luc Alphand	(Austria) Patrick Wirth
922	SG	1996/97	21 February 1997	(France) Luc Alphand	(Austria) Hermann Maier	(Italy) Werner Perathoner
923	DH	1996/97	22 February 1997	(France) Luc Alphand	(Italy) Pietro Vitalini	(Italy) Kristian Ghedina
924	SG	1996/97	23 February 1997	(Austria) Hermann Maier	(Italy) Kristian Ghedina	(Norway) Atle Skårdal (Norway) Lasse Kjus
961	DH	1997/98	31 January 1998	(Austria) Andreas Schifferer	(France) Nicolas Burtin	(Austria) Hermann Maier
962	SG	1997/98	1 February 1998	(Austria) Hermann Maier	(Austria) Hans Knauß	(Norway) Lasse Kjus
1027	DH	1999/00	29 January 2000	(Austria) Hermann Maier	(Italy) Kristian Ghedina	(Austria) Hannes Trinkl
1067	DH	2000/01	27 January 2001	(Austria) Fritz Strobl	(Austria) Peter Rzehak	(Switzerland) Franco Cavegn
1068	SG	2000/01	28 January 2001	(Austria) Christoph Gruber	(Austria) Hermann Maier	(Switzerland) Didier Cuche
1103	SG	2001/02	26 January 2002	(Austria) Fritz Strobl	(Switzerland) Didier Cuche	(Austria) Stephan Eberharter
1104	SG	2001/02	27 January 2002	(Austria) Stephan Eberharter	(Switzerland) Didier Cuche	(Austria) Andreas Schifferer
1141	DH	2002/03	22 February 2003	(Austria) Stephan Eberharter	(Switzerland) Didier Cuche	(United States) Daron Rahlves
1142	SG	2002/03	23 February 2003	(Liechtenstein) Marco Büchel	(Austria) Stephan Eberharter	(Switzerland) Tobias Grünenfelder
1175	DH	2003/04	30 January 2004	(Switzerland) Didier Cuche	(United States) Daron Rahlves	(Austria) Stephan Eberharter
1176	DH	2003/04	31 January 2004	(Austria) Stephan Eberharter	(Austria) Fritz Strobl	(Italy) Alessandro Fattori
1177	SG	2003/04	1 February 2004	(Austria) Hermann Maier	(France) Pierre-Emmanuel Dalcin	(Switzerland) Tobias Grünenfelder
1214	DH	2004/05	18 February 2005	(Austria) Michael Walchhofer	(Austria) Hermann Maier	(United States) Bode Miller
1215	DH	2004/05	19 February 2005	(Austria) Michael Walchhofer	(Austria) Mario Scheiber	(Austria) Fritz Strobl
1216	SG	2004/05	20 February 2005	(Austria) Christoph Gruber	(Switzerland) Didier Défago	(Canada) François Bourque
1251	DH	2005/06	28 January 2006	(Austria) Hermann Maier	(Austria) Klaus Kröll	(Austria) Andreas Buder
1252	SG	2005/06	29 January 2006	(Austria) Christoph Gruber	(United States) Scott Macartney	(Norway) Kjetil André Aamodt
1286	DH	2006/07	23 February 2007	(Slovenia) Andrej Jerman	(Austria) Hans Grugger	(Canada) Erik Guay
1287	DH	2006/07	24 February 2007	(Canada) Erik Guay	(Slovenia) Andrej Jerman	(Switzerland) Didier Cuche
"Kandahar 2" (new course)
	DH	2008/09	31 January 2009	fog at mid-course; replaced in Kvitfjell on 6 March 2009		
1404	DH	2009/10	10 March 2010	(Switzerland) Carlo Janka	(Austria) Mario Scheiber	(Canada) Erik Guay (Switzerland) Patrick Küng
1405	SG	2009/10	11 March 2010	(Canada) Erik Guay	(Croatia) Ivica Kostelić	(Norway) Aksel Lund Svindal
1406	GS	2009/10	12 March 2010	(Switzerland) Carlo Janka	(Italy) Davide Simoncelli	(Austria) Philipp Schörghofer (United States) Ted Ligety
1467	DH	2011/12	28 January 2012	(Switzerland) Didier Cuche	(Canada) Erik Guay	(Austria) Hannes Reichelt
	SG	2011/12	29 January 2012	fog; replaced in Kvitfjell on 2 March 2012		
1514	DH	2012/13	23 February 2013	(Italy) Christof Innerhofer	(Austria) Georg Streitberger	(Austria) Klaus Kröll
1515	GS	2012/13	24 February 2013	(France) Alexis Pinturault	(Austria) Marcel Hirscher	(United States) Ted Ligety
	DH	2013/14	1 February 2014	lack of snow; replaced in St. Moritz on 1 February 2014		
	GS	2013/14	2 February 2014	lack of snow; replaced in St. Moritz on 2 February 2014		
1583	DH	2014/15	28 February 2015	(Austria) Hannes Reichelt	(Austria) Romed Baumann	(Austria) Matthias Mayer
1584	GS	2014/15	1 March 2015	(Austria) Marcel Hirscher	(Germany) Felix Neureuther	(Austria) Benjamin Raich
1617	DH	2015/16	30 January 2016	(Norway) Aleksander Aamodt Kilde	(Slovenia) Boštjan Kline	(Switzerland) Beat Feuz
	GS	2015/16	31 January 2016	humid, pouring rain, fog; replaced in Kranjska Gora on 4 March 2016		
1660	DH	2016/17	27 January 2017	(United States) Travis Ganong	(Norway) Kjetil Jansrud	(Italy) Peter Fill
1661	DH	2016/17	28 January 2017	(Austria) Hannes Reichelt	(Italy) Peter Fill	(Switzerland) Beat Feuz
1662	GS	2016/17	29 January 2017	(Austria) Marcel Hirscher	(Sweden) Matts Olsson	(Germany) Stefan Luitz
1699	DH	2017/18	27 January 2018	(Switzerland) Beat Feuz	(Austria) Vincent Kriechmayr (Italy) Dominik Paris	
1700	GS	2017/18	28 January 2018	(Austria) Marcel Hirscher	(Austria) Manuel Feller	(United States) Ted Ligety
	DH	2018/19	2 February 2019	cancelled; fog, rain, heavy snowfall, replaced in Kvitfjell on 1 March 2019		
	GS	2018/19	3 February 2019	cancelled; fog, rain, heavy snowfall		
1772	DH	2019/20	1 February 2020	(Germany) Thomas Dreßen	(Norway) Aleksander Aamodt Kilde	(France) Johan Clarey
1773	GS	2019/20	2 February 2020	(France) Alexis Pinturault	(Switzerland) Loïc Meillard	(Norway) Leif Kristian Nestvold-Haugen
	SG	2020/21	5 February 2021	originally scheduled SG was moved to 6 February due to weather		
1808	DH	2020/21	5 February 2021	(Italy) Dominik Paris	(Switzerland) Beat Feuz	(Austria) Matthias Mayer
	DH	2020/21	6 February 2021	originally scheduled DH was moved to 5 February due to weather		
1809	SG	2020/21	6 February 2021	(Austria) Vincent Kriechmayr	(Austria) Matthias Mayer	(Switzerland) Marco Odermatt
	DH	2022/23	28 January 2023	lack of snow; no replacement		
	GS	2022/23	29 January 2023	lack of snow; moved to Schladming on 25 January 2023		
1914	SG	2023/24	27 January 2024	(France) Nils Allègre	(Italy) Guglielmo Bosca	(Switzerland) Loïc Meillard
1915	SG	2023/24	28 January 2024	(Switzerland) Marco Odermatt	(Austria) Raphael Haaser	(Switzerland) Franjo von Allmen
1953	DH	2024/25	2 February 2025	cancelled due to lack of training due to bad weather conditions		
1993	DH	2025/26	28 February 2026	(Switzerland) Marco Odermatt	(Switzerland) Alexis Monney	(Switzerland) Stefan Rogentin
	SG	2025/26	1 March 2026	rescheduled to Courchevel on 13 March due to problems with fog		

Not in original calendar. It replaced Val d'Isere (1993), Sestriere (1996), Whistler Mountain (1997), Wengen (2004, 2017), Kitzbühel (2005, 2007).
Cancelled SL in St. Anton (1992) replaced in Ga-Pa and with scheduled DH there counted for classic combined.
In 1981, GS in Morzine (6 January) counted for combined with DH in Garmisch (10 January).

=== Women ===
No.	Type	Season	Date	Winner	Second	Third
FIS–A
—	DH	1954	—	(West Germany) Miri Buchner	N/A	N/A
—	KB	1954	—	(West Germany) Miri Buchner	N/A	N/A
—	DH	1959	—	(Austria) Erika Netzer	N/A	N/A
—	KB	1959	—	(Canada) Anne Heggtveit	N/A	N/A
—	GS	1964	—	(Austria) Edith Zimmermann	N/A	N/A
—	KB	1964	—	(France) Marielle Goitschel	N/A	N/A
World Cup
75	DH	1969/70	30 January 1970	(France) Françoise Macchi	(Austria) Wiltrud Drexel	(France) Michèle Jacot
233	DH	1976/77	11 January 1977	(Austria) Annemarie Moser-Pröll	(Switzerland) Bernadette Zurbriggen	(Switzerland) Marie-Theres Nadig
661	DH	1990/91	8 February 1991	(Switzerland) Chantal Bournissen	(France) Carole Merle	(Austria) Veronika Wallinger
662	SG	1990/91	9 February 1991	(France) Carole Merle	(Germany) Karin Dedler	(Germany) Michaela Gerg
	DH	1993/94	28 January 1994	replacement for Leysin; due to strong wind rescheduled on 29 January		
	DH	1993/94	29 January 1994	original DH from Ga-Pa rescheduled on 30 January; due to replacement from Leysin		
758	DH	1993/94	29 January 1994	(Italy) Isolde Kostner	(France) Mélanie Suchet	(Canada) Michelle Ruthven
	SG	1993/94	30 January 1994	original SG from Ga-Pa cancelled; due to rescheduled DH from 29 January		
	DH	1993/94	30 January 1994	rescheduled DH from 29 January cancelled due to fatal crash of Ulrike Maier		
784	SG	1994/95	14 January 1995	(France) Florence Masnada	(United States) Picabo Street	(United States) Shannon Nobis
819	SG	1995/96	13 January 1996	(Germany) Katja Seizinger	(Germany) Martina Ertl	(Austria) Alexandra Meissnitzer
1003	SG	2000/01	16 February 2001	(France) Carole Montillet	(Austria) Renate Götschl	(Austria) Brigitte Obermoser
	SG	2000/01	17 February 2001	cancelled		
	SG	2008/09	31 January 2009	fog in mid-course; replaced on next day 1 February 2009		
1273	SG	2008/09	1 February 2009	(United States) Lindsey Vonn	(Sweden) Anja Pärson	(Sweden) Jessica Lindell-Vikarby
1314	DH	2009/10	10 March 2010	(Germany) Maria Riesch	(United States) Lindsey Vonn	(Sweden) Anja Pärson
1315	GS	2009/10	11 March 2010	(Slovenia) Tina Maze	(Germany) Kathrin Hölzl	(Germany) Maria Riesch
1316	SG	2009/10	12 March 2010	(United States) Lindsey Vonn	(Austria) Elisabeth Görgl	(Switzerland) Nadia Styger
1372	DH	2011/12	4 February 2012	(United States) Lindsey Vonn	(Switzerland) Nadja Kamer	(Liechtenstein) Tina Weirather
1373	SG	2011/12	5 February 2012	(United States) Julia Mancuso	(Austria) Anna Fenninger	(Liechtenstein) Tina Weirather
1416	SG	2012/13	1 March 2013	(Liechtenstein) Tina Weirather	(Slovenia) Tina Maze (United States) Julia Mancuso	
1417	DH	2012/13	2 March 2013	(Slovenia) Tina Maze	(United States) Laurenne Ross	(Germany) Maria Höfl-Riesch
1418	SG	2012/13	3 March 2013	(Austria) Anna Fenninger	(Germany) Maria Höfl-Riesch	(United States) Julia Mancuso
	DH	2013/14	1 February 2014	lack of snow; replaced in Cortina d'Ampezzo on 25 January 2014		
	SG	2013/14	2 February 2014	lack of snow; replaced in Cortina d'Ampezzo on 26 January 2014		
1479	DH	2014/15	7 March 2015	(Liechtenstein) Tina Weirather	(Austria) Anna Fenninger	(Slovenia) Tina Maze
1480	SG	2014/15	8 March 2015	(United States) Lindsey Vonn	(Slovenia) Tina Maze	(Austria) Anna Fenninger
1510	DH	2015/16	6 February 2016	(United States) Lindsey Vonn	(Switzerland) Fabienne Suter	(Germany) Viktoria Rebensburg
1511	SG	2015/16	7 February 2016	(Switzerland) Lara Gut	(Germany) Viktoria Rebensburg	(United States) Lindsey Vonn
1547	DH	2016/17	21 January 2017	(United States) Lindsey Vonn	(Switzerland) Lara Gut	(Germany) Viktoria Rebensburg
1548	SG	2016/17	22 January 2017	(Switzerland) Lara Gut	(Austria) Stephanie Venier	(Liechtenstein) Tina Weirather
1593	DH	2017/18	3 February 2018	(United States) Lindsey Vonn	(Italy) Sofia Goggia	(Austria) Cornelia Hütter
1594	DH	2017/18	4 February 2018	(United States) Lindsey Vonn	(Italy) Sofia Goggia	(Liechtenstein) Tina Weirather
	DH	2018/19	26 January 2019	program switched due to bad weather forecast; DH moved from 26 to 27 January		
1624	SG	2018/19	26 January 2019	(Austria) Nicole Schmidhofer	(Italy) Sofia Goggia	(Switzerland) Lara Gut-Behrami
	SG	2018/19	27 January 2019	program switched due to bad weather forecast; SG moved from 27 to 26 January		
1625	DH	2018/19	27 January 2019	(Austria) Stephanie Venier	(Italy) Sofia Goggia	(Germany) Kira Weidle
1659	DH	2019/20	8 February 2020	(Germany) Viktoria Rebensburg	(Italy) Federica Brignone	(Czech Republic) Ester Ledecká
1660	SG	2019/20	9 February 2020	(Switzerland) Corinne Suter	(Austria) Nicole Schmidhofer	(Switzerland) Wendy Holdener
	DH	2020/21	30 January 2021	DH was replaced with SG; as due to weather no dowhnill was possible		
1687	SG	2020/21	30 January 2021	(Switzerland) Lara Gut-Behrami	(Norway) Kajsa Vickhoff Lie	(Canada) Marie-Michèle Gagnon
	SG	2020/21	31 January 2021	SG was cancelled due to heavy fog; replaced on the next day on 1 February		
1688	SG	2020/21	1 February 2021	(Switzerland) Lara Gut-Behrami	(Slovakia) Petra Vlhová	(Austria) Tamara Tippler
1723	DH	2021/22	29 January 2022	(Switzerland) Corinne Suter	(Switzerland) Jasmine Flury	(Austria) Cornelia Hütter
1724	SG	2021/22	30 January 2022	(Italy) Federica Brignone (Austria) Cornelia Hütter		(Austria) Tamara Tippler
	DH	2023/24	3 February 2024	cancelled due to the high temperatures and unfavorable snow conditions		
	SG	2023/24	4 January 2024	cancelled due to the high temperatures and unfavorable snow conditions		
1830	DH	2024/25	25 January 2025	(Italy) Federica Brignone	(Italy) Sofia Goggia	(Switzerland) Corinne Suter
1831	SG	2024/25	26 January 2025	(Switzerland) Lara Gut-Behrami	(Norway) Kajsa Vickhoff Lie	(Italy) Federica Brignone

Not in original calendar. It replaced Leysin (1994) and Val d'Isere (2013).

== Sections ==
=== Kandahar 1 (W) ===
- Tröglhang, Schussanger, Himmelreich, Bödele, Eishang, Seilbahn Stadl, Waldeck, Ramwiesen, Höllentor, Hölle, FIS Schneise, Tauber-Schuss

=== Kandahar 2 (M) ===
- Tröglhang, Olimpiakurve, Panorama-Sprung, Stegerwald, Alte Quelle, Eishang, Kramarsprung, Padöls, Auf der Mauer, Frei Fall, Tauber-Schuss

== Fatal accidents ==
On 29 January 1994, Austrian ski racer Ulrike Maier suffered fatal injuries at "FIS Schneise" section crashing into intermediate timing device at 105 km/h (65 mph) during the World Cup downhill event. A week before, she won a giant slalom in Maribor.

Thirty-five years earlier in 1959, Canadian John Semmelink crashed into a rock-filled gully and later succumbed to his injuries. Held on an icy course on 7 February in challenging conditions of fog and flat light, Semmerlink was the 44th racer on the course. At a lower section named Himmelreich (heaven) just 500 yards (460 m) from the finish, witnesses said one of his bindings opened and he crashed into a rock-filled gully. Semmerlink had a serious head injury and was taken by U.S. Army helicopter to a nearby U.S. military dispensary, but died of his injuries. Of the 89 starters, 39 did not finish the race.

== Club5+ ==
In 1986, elite Club5 was originally founded by prestigious classic downhill organizers: Kitzbühel, Wengen, Garmisch, Val d’Isère and Val Gardena/Gröden, with goal to bring alpine ski sport on the highest levels possible.

Later over the years other classic longterm organizers joined the now named Club5+: Alta Badia, Cortina, Kranjska Gora, Maribor, Lake Louise, Schladming, Adelboden, Kvitfjell, St.Moritz and Åre.
