= FIS Alpine World Ski Championships 2011 – Nations team event =

Nations team event at the FIS Alpine World Ski Championships 2011
- Venue: Garmisch Classic; Garmisch-Partenkirchen, germany
- Date: 16 February 2011
- Teams: 11

Medalists
gold medal	Taïna Barioz; Anémone Marmottan; Tessa Worley; Thomas Fanara; Cyprien Richard; Gauthier de Tessières	France
silver medal	Anna Fenninger; Michaela Kirchgasser; Marlies Schild; Romed Baumann; Benjamin Raich; Philipp Schörghofer	Austria
bronze medal	Sara Hector; Anja Pärson; Maria Pietilä-Holmner; Axel Bäck; Hans Olsson; Matts Olsson	Sweden

The Nations Team Event competition at the 2011 World Championships ran on February 16 at 11:00 local time, the seventh race of the championships. Athletes from the best 16 nations in the FIS Overall Nations Cup ranking competed.

== Rules ==
The 16 best nations in the FIS Overall Nations Cup Ranking were eligible to participate in this event. If one or more nations didn't start, they were not replaced. Each team consisted of 4 to 6 skiers, but at least two female and two male skiers.

The format was a K.O. round competition with the pairings being made according to the Nations Cup Ranking. In each pairing 2 female & 2 male skiers from each team raced a parallel giant slalom in a best-of-4 system. In the event of a tie, the faster cumulated time of the best male and the best female skier decides which team will advance to the next round.

== FIS Overall Nations Cup standing (prior to the World Championships) ==
Rank	Country	Points
1	Austria	7662
2	Switzerland	4573
3	France	3734
4	Italy	3728
5	United States	3230
6	Germany	3097
7	Sweden	2487
8	Croatia	1424
9	Norway	1346
10	Canada	1280
11	Slovenia	976
12	Finland	804
13	Czech Republic	433
14	Slovakia	257
15	Japan	66
16	Liechtenstein	55
17	Spain	51
18	Moldova	40
19	Great Britain	9
20	Russia	8
21	Poland	4

== Participating teams ==
Country	Skiers
Austria	Anna Fenninger
Austria	Michaela Kirchgasser
Austria	Marlies Schild
Austria	Romed Baumann
Austria	Benjamin Raich
Austria	Philipp Schörghofer
Switzerland	Denise Feierabend
Switzerland	Wendy Holdener
Switzerland	Fabienne Suter
Switzerland	Marc Berthod
Switzerland	Beat Feuz
Switzerland	Justin Murisier
France	Taïna Barioz
France	Anémone Marmottan
France	Tessa Worley
France	Thomas Fanara
France	Cyprien Richard
France	Gauthier de Tessières
Italy	Federica Brignone
Italy	Daniela Merighetti
Italy	Johanna Schnarf
Italy	Massimiliano Blardone
Italy	Giovanni Borsotti
Italy	Christian Deville
United States	Julia Mancuso
United States	Megan McJames
United States	Sarah Schleper
United States	Tim Jitloff
United States	Ted Ligety
United States	Bode Miller
Germany	Lena Dürr
Germany	Veronique Hronek
Germany	Veronika Staber
Germany	Fritz Dopfer
Germany	Stefan Luitz
Germany	Felix Neureuther

Country	Skiers
Sweden	Sara Hector
Sweden	Anja Pärson
Sweden	Maria Pietilä-Holmner
Sweden	Axel Bäck
Sweden	Hans Olsson
Sweden	Matts Olsson
Croatia	Sofija Novoselić
Croatia	Tea Palić
Croatia	Tin Široki
Croatia	Natko Zrnčić-Dim
Croatia	–
Croatia	–
Canada	Marie-Michèle Gagnon
Canada	Britt Janyk
Canada	Marie-Pier Préfontaine
Canada	Michael Janyk
Canada	Paul Stutz
Canada	–
Czech Republic	Martina Dubovská
Czech Republic	Katerina Paulathová
Czech Republic	Andrea Zemanová
Czech Republic	Ondřej Bank
Czech Republic	Kryštof Krýzl
Czech Republic	Adam Zika
Slovakia	Jana Gantnerová
Slovakia	Kristina Sallová
Slovakia	Jaroslav Babušiak
Slovakia	Adam Žampa
Slovakia	–
Slovakia	–

== Results bracket ==
1/8 Final
8	Croatia	3
9	Canada	2
6	Germany	4
11	Slovakia	0
7	Sweden	3
10	Czech Republic	1

1/4 Final
1	Austria (f)	2
8	Croatia	2
5	United States	1
4	Italy	3
3	France (f)	2
6	Germany	2
7	Sweden	4
2	Switzerland	0

1/2 Final
1	Austria	4
4	Italy	0
3	France (f)	2
7	Sweden	2

Finals
1	Austria	2
3	France (f)	2
Third place
4	Italy	0
7	Sweden	4

- (f) = In the event of a tie, the faster cumulated time of the best male and the best female skier decides which team will advance to the next round

== Results ==
As Norway, Slovenia, Finland, Japan, and Liechtenstein chose not to participate, the 5 highest-placed teams (Austria, Switzerland, France, Italy, United States) in the FIS Overall Nations Cup Ranking received a bye in the qualification round.

=== 1/8 Final ===
Team 1	Score	Team 2
Croatia	3–2	Canada
Palić 27.04	3–2	B. Janyk 27.04
Široki 26.25	3–2	M. Janyk 26.18
Novoselić 26.73	3–2	Gagnon 26.78
Zrnčić-Dim 30.31	3–2	Stutz 33.77
Germany	4–0	Slovakia
Dürr 27.23	4–0	Gantnerová 27.37
Dopfer 25.78	4–0	Babušiak 27.01
Hronek 27.08	4–0	Saalová 27.67
Neureuther 25.89	4–0	Zampa 29.01
Sweden	3–1	Czech Republic
Pärson 26.88	3–1	Paulathová 26.98
M. Olsson 26.59	3–1	Kryzl 25.44
Pietilä-Holmner 26.46	3–1	Zemanová 27.93
H. Olsson 25.80	3–1	Zika 25.86

=== 1/4 Final ===
Team 1	Score	Team 2
Austria	2–2	Croatia
Schild 27.16	2–2	Novoselić 26.69
Raich DNF	2–2	Zrnčić-Dim 26.39
Kirchgasser 26.38	2–2	Palić DNF
Baumann 25.74	2–2	Široki 25.98
United States	1–3	Italy
Schleper 27.33	1–3	Merighetti 27.26
Miller 25.54	1–3	Deville 26.01
Mancuso 26.77	1–3	Schnarf 26.64
Ligety 26.72	1–3	Blardone 26.33

Team 1	Score	Team 2
France	2–2	Germany
Barioz 26.91	2–2	Dürr 26.89
Fanara 25.84	2–2	Dopfer DNF
Worley 26.56	2–2	Hronek 26.89
Richard 25.99	2–2	Neureuther 25.69
Sweden	4–0	Switzerland
Pärson 26.96	4–0	Holdener 27.24
M. Olsson 25.80	4–0	Berthod 26.31
Pietilä-Holmner 26.85	4–0	Feierabend DNF
H. Olsson 25.81	4–0	Feuz 26.26

=== Semifinals ===
Team 1	Score	Team 2
Austria	4–0	Italy
Fenninger 26.71	4–0	Merighetti 26.88
Schörghofer 25.98	4–0	Blardone 26.09
Kirchgasser 26.56	4–0	Schnarf 27.38
Baumann 26.02	4–0	Deville 26.83

Team 1	Score	Team 2
France	2–2	Sweden
Barioz 27.21	2–2	Pärson 26.66
Fanara 25.69	2–2	M. Olsson 25.74
Worley 26.49	2–2	Pietilä-Holmner 26.46
Richard 25.54	2–2	H. Olsson 25.61

=== Finals ===
Team 1	Small Final	Team 2
Italy	0–4	Sweden
Brignone 28.53	0–4	Pärson 26.56
Borsotti 25.79	0–4	H. Olsson 25.65
Schnarf 26.93	0–4	Pietilä-Holmner 26.59
Blardone 25.73	0–4	M. Olsson 25.65

Team 1	Final	Team 2
Austria	2–2	France
Fenninger 26.41	2–2	Worley 26.51
Schörghofer 25.86	2–2	Richard 25.41
Kirchgasser 26.55	2–2	Marmottan 26.54
Baumann 25.69	2–2	Fanara 26.08

In the end France won the title with three 2-2 results, always with the faster total time of the best male and the best female racer.

And the final victory was decided by 1/100 of a second: if Kirchgasser had raced 0,01 sec faster (or Marmottan 0,01 sec slower) the result would have been 3:2 for Austria.
