= Joachim Puchner =

Austrian alpine skier

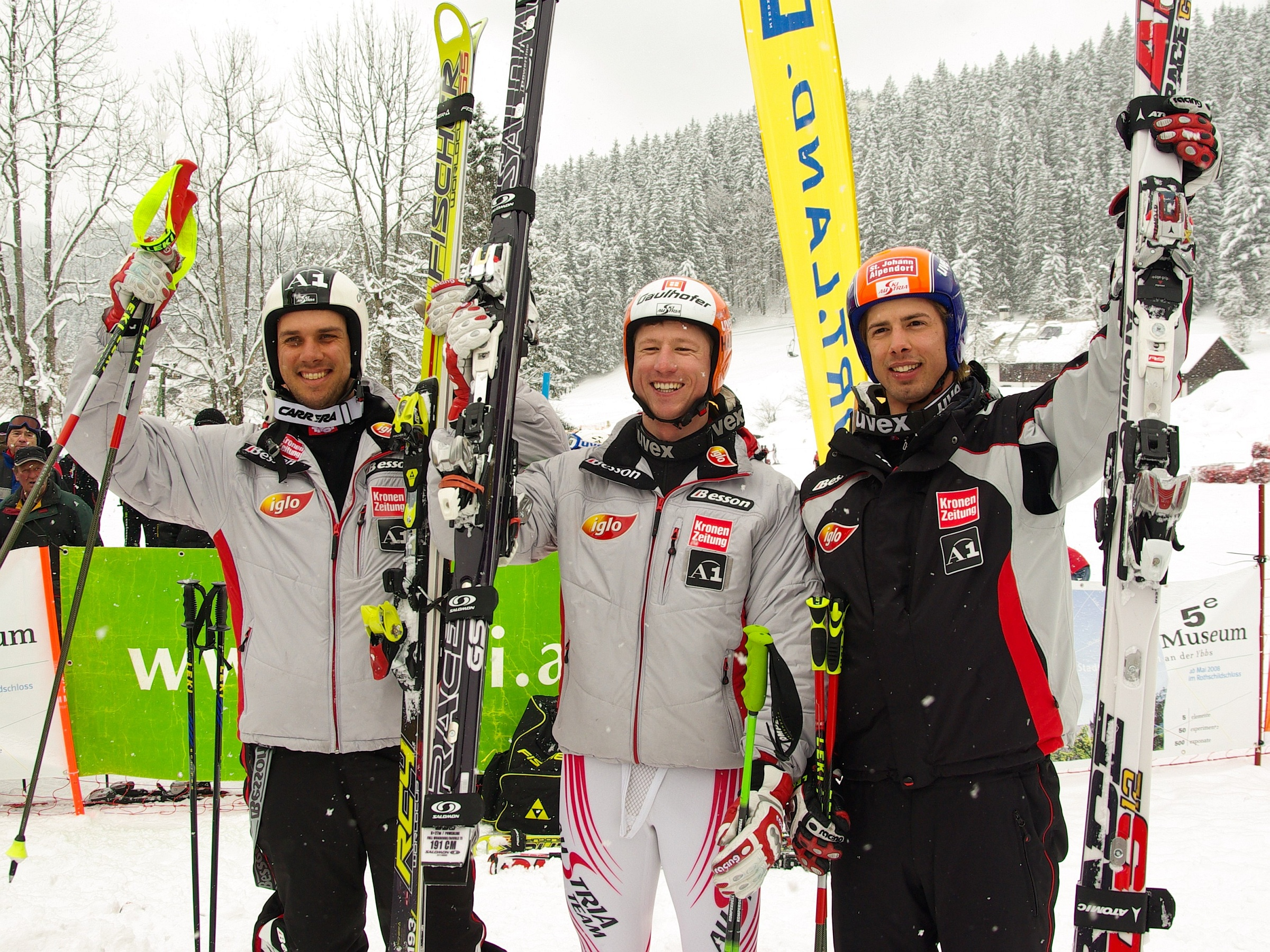
- Puchner (right) in March 2009

Personal information
- Born: September 25, 1987 (age 38) Vöcklabruck, Upper Austria, Austria
- Height: 1.90 m (6 ft 3 in)
- Website: joachim-puchner.at

Skiing career
- Sport: Alpine skiing
- Club: WSV St. Johann - Salzburg
- Disciplines: Downhill, Super G, Combined
- World Cup debut: January 16, 2009 (age 21)

Olympics
- Teams: 0

World Championships
- Teams: 1 – (2011)
- Medals: 0

World Cup
- Seasons: 4 – (2010-13)
- Wins: 0
- Podiums: 3 – (1 DH, 2 SG)
- Overall titles: 0 – (21st 2012)
- Discipline titles: 0 – (11th in SG: 2012)
Medal record
Men's alpine skiing
Representing Austria
Junior World Ski Championships
Silver medal – second place	2007 Altenmarkt	Super G

Joachim Puchner (born September 25, 1987) is a retired World Cup alpine ski racer from Austria. Born in Vöcklabruck, Upper Austria, Puchner made his World Cup debut in January 2009 and specialized in the speed events of Downhill and Super G. He is the brother of alpine skier Mirjam Puchner.

== World Cup podiums ==
- 3 podiums – (1 DH, 2 SG)

Season	Date	Location	Discipline	Place
2011	13 Mar 2011	Kvitfjell, Norway	Super G	3rd
2011	16 Mar 2011	Lenzerheide, Switzerland	Downhill	2nd
2013	25 Nov 2012	Lake Louise, Canada	Super G	3rd
