= Matts Olsson =

Swedish alpine skier

Personal information
- Born: 1 December 1988 (age 37) Karlstad, Sweden
- Height: 1.79 m (5 ft 10 in)

Skiing career
- Sport: Alpine skiing
- Club: Valfjällets SLK
- Retired: 2 March 2020 (age 31)
- Disciplines: Giant slalom
- World Cup debut: 28 October 2007 (age 18)

Olympics
- Teams: 2 – (2014, 2018)
- Medals: 0

World Championships
- Teams: 6 – (2007, 2011–2019)
- Medals: 0

World Cup
- Seasons: 12 – (2008–15, 2017–2020)
- Wins: 1 – (1 PG)
- Podiums: 4 – (3 GS, 1 PG)
- Overall titles: 0 – (27th in 2018)
- Discipline titles: 0 – (5th in GS, 2018)
Medal record
Men's alpine skiing
Representing Sweden
World Championships
Bronze medal – third place	2011 Garmisch-Partenkirchen	Team event

Matts Olsson (born 1 December 1988) is a Swedish former World Cup alpine ski racer who raced in the giant slalom discipline.

Born in Karlstad, Olsson made his World Cup debut at age 19 in October 2007. He won a bronze medal at the 2011 World Championships in the team event, and finished 18th in the giant slalom, and 24th in the super-G.

Matts Olsson won his first World Cup competition victory in Alta Badia in December 2017 at an evening event in Parallel giant slalom. Olsson defeated Marcel Hirscher in the semi-final and Henrik Kristoffersen in the final. The victory was Sweden's first World Cup win in Parallel giant slalom.

On 14 March 2020, Olsson announced his retirement from the sport following the 2019–2020 season.

== World cup results ==
=== Season standings ===
Season	Age	Overall	Slalom	Giant slalom	Super-G	Downhill	Combined
2009	20	145	—	50	—	—	—
2010	21	0 points					
2011	22	63	—	13	—	—	42
2012	23	65	—	21	—	—	—
2013	24	79	—	26	—	—	—
2014	25	47	—	13	—	—	—
2015	26	73	—	22	—	—	—
2016	27	injured					
2017	28	34	—	8	—	—	—
2018	29	27	—	5	—	—	—
2019	30	29	—	6	—	—	—
2020	31	79	—	21	—	—	—

=== Race podiums ===
- 1 win – (1 PG)
- 4 podiums – (3 GS, 1 PG)

Season	Date	Location	Discipline	Place
2017	29 Jan 2017	Garmisch-Partenkirchen, Germany	Giant slalom	2nd
2017	4 Mar 2017	Kranjska Gora, Slovenia	Giant slalom	3rd
2018	18 Dec 2017	Alta Badia, Italy	Parallel-G	1st
2019	8 Dec 2018	Val d'Isere, France	Giant slalom	3rd

== World Championships results ==
Year	Age	Slalom	Giant slalom	Super-G	Downhill	Combined
2007	18	—	—	28	36	—
2009	20					
2011	22	—	18	24	—	—
2013	24	—	18	32	—	—
2015	26	—	5	—	—	—
2017	28	—	6	—	—	—
2019	30	—	16	—	—	—

== Olympic results ==
Year	Age	Slalom	Giant slalom	Super-G	Downhill	Combined
2014	25	—	14	—	—	—
2018	29	—	10	—	—	—
