= Anémone Marmottan =

French alpine skier (born 1988)

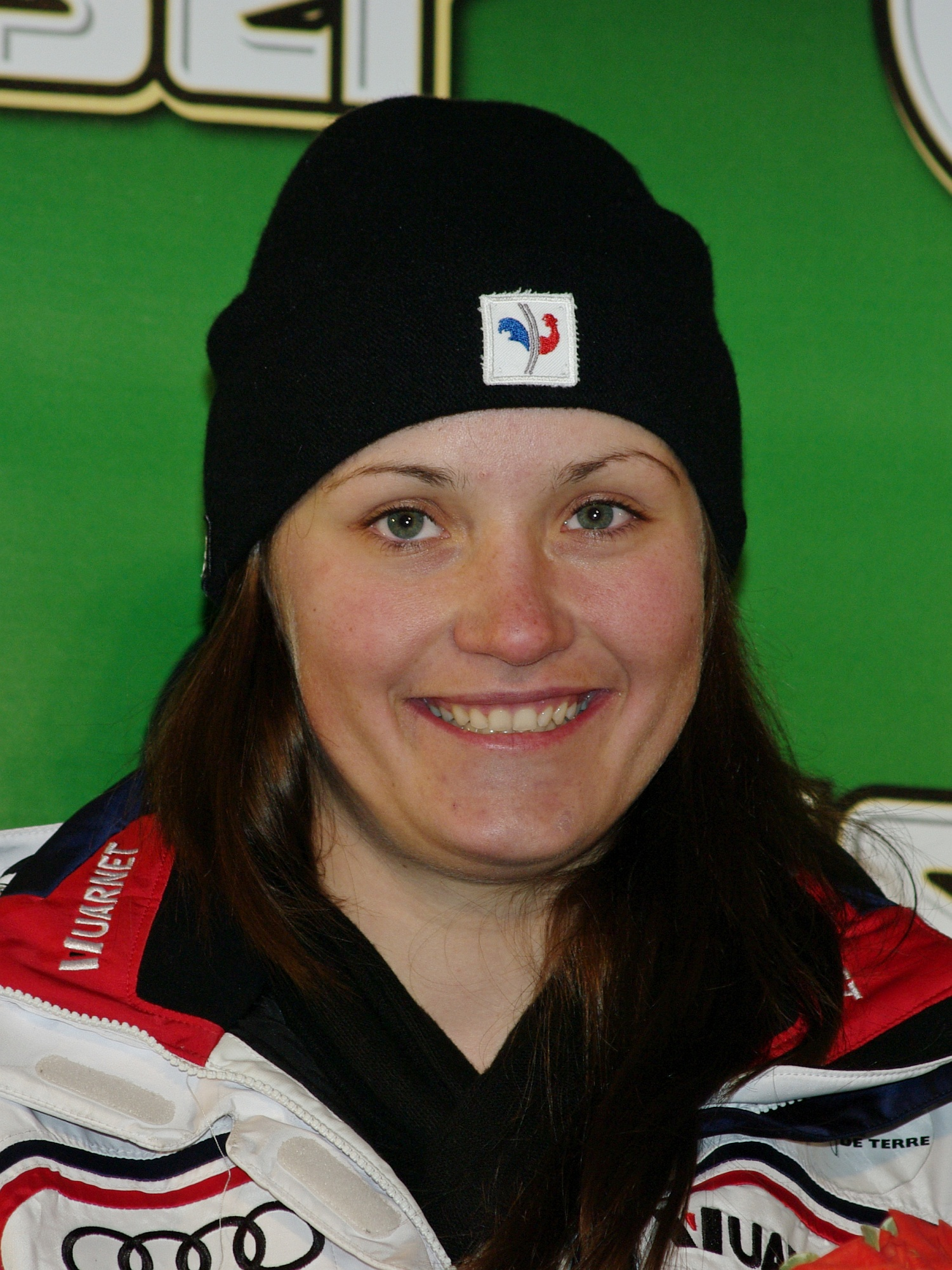
- Marmottan in December 2010

Personal information
- Born: 25 May 1988 (age 38) Bourg-Saint-Maurice, Savoie, France
- Height: 1.70 m (5 ft 7 in)

Skiing career
- Sport: Alpine skiing
- Club: EMHM – C.S. Val-d'Isère
- Disciplines: Giant slalom, slalom
- World Cup debut: 25 October 2008 (age 20)

Olympics
- Teams: 2 – (2010, 2014)
- Medals: 0

World Championships
- Teams: 2 – (2011, 2013)
- Medals: 0

World Cup
- Seasons: 5th – (2010–14)
- Wins: 0
- Podiums: 1 – (1 GS)
- Overall titles: 0 – (25th in 2014)
- Discipline titles: 0 – (6th in GS, 2014)
Medal record
Women's alpine skiing
Representing France
World Championships
Gold medal – first place	2011 Garmisch	Team event

Anémone Marmottan (born 25 May 1988) is a French World Cup alpine ski racer and soldier.

Born in Bourg-Saint-Maurice, Savoie, Marmottan won a gold medal in the team event at the 2011 World Championships, and the next day finished 14th in the giant slalom.

== Career ==
Marmottan began skiing at age two with her family in her hometown of Savine, and joined the local ski club in her area, where she got her first taste for competing. In March 2011, she fractured her tibia and fibula while racing in a Europa Cup event in Zakopane, Poland. The injury resulted in surgery, six months in a cast, and another six months wearing a support brace.

At the 2014 Winter Olympics in Sochi, Marmottan finished 8th in the giant slalom and 13th in the slalom at Rosa Khutor. She attained her first World Cup podium in March 2014 at Åre, Sweden, runner-up in a giant slalom to Anna Fenninger.

== World Cup results ==
=== Season standings ===
Season	Age	Overall	Slalom	Giant Slalom	Super G	Downhill	Combined
2010	21	70	33	31	—	—	—
2011	22	35	44	11	—	—	43
2012	23	58	—	18	—	—	—
2013	24	47	44	18	—	—	—
2014	25	25	42	6	—	—	—

=== Race podiums ===
- 1 podiums – (1 GS), 13 top tens (13 (GS)

Season	Date	Location	Discipline	Place
2014	6 Mar 2014	Åre, Sweden	Giant slalom	2nd

== Olympic results ==
Event	Downhill	Super-G	Giant slalom	Slalom	Combined
2010 Vancouver	—	—	11	—	—
2014 Sochi	—	—	8	13	—
