= Kathrin Hölzl =

German alpine skier

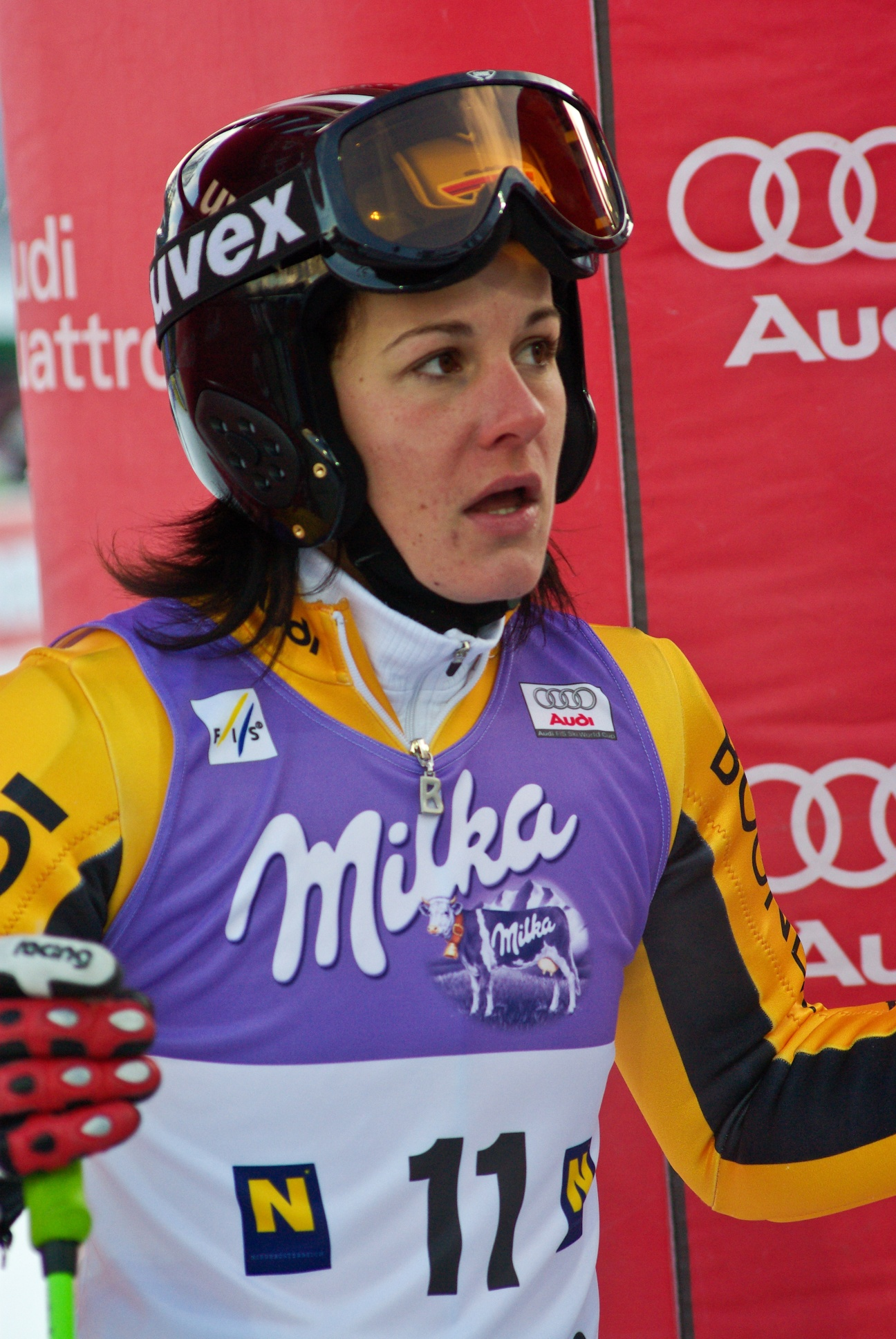
- Hölzl in December 2008

Personal information
- Born: 18 July 1984 (age 42) Berchtesgaden, Bavaria, West Germany
- Height: 163 cm (5 ft 4 in)
- Website: katy-hoelzl.de

Skiing career
- Sport: Alpine skiing
- Club: WSV Bischofswiesen
- Retired: 28 December 2011 (age 27)
- Disciplines: Giant slalom, slalom
- World Cup debut: 15 December 2001 (age 17)

Olympics
- Teams: 1 - (2010)
- Medals: 0

World Championships
- Teams: 3 - (2007-11)
- Medals: 1 (1 gold)

World Cup
- Seasons: 11 - (2002-2012)
- Wins: 2 - (2 GS)
- Podiums: 9 - (9 GS)
- Overall titles: 0 - (8th in 2010)
- Discipline titles: 1 - (GS in 2010)
Medal record
Women's alpine skiing
Representing Germany
World Championships
Gold medal – first place	2009 Val-d'Isère	Giant slalom

Kathrin Hölzl (born 18 July 1984) is a retired World Cup alpine ski racer from Germany. Born in Berchtesgaden, Bavaria, she was the gold medalist in the giant slalom at the 2009 World Championships.

Hölzl made her World Cup debut in December 2001 in Val d'Isère, France. Following her world championship in February 2009, she scored her first World Cup victory in a giant slalom at Aspen in November, followed by another win in December at Lienz. She made two additional podiums and won the World Cup giant slalom title for the 2010 season. In October 2013 Hölzl announced her retirement from the sport after struggling with injuries and illness for several years, having last competed in a World Cup race in December 2011.

== World Cup results ==
=== Season standings ===
Season	Age	Overall	Slalom	Giant slalom	Super G	Downhill	Combined
2006	21	70	44	26	—	—	—
2007	22	29	34	5	—	—	47
2008	23	24	17	8	—	—	—
2009	24	25	17	12	—	—	—
2010	25	8	27	1	—	—	43
2011	26	25	29	7	—	—	—
2012	27	missed season due to injury					

=== Season titles ===
Season	Discipline
2010	Giant slalom

=== Races podiums ===
- 2 wins – (2 GS)
- 9 podiums – (9 GS)

Season	Date	Location	Discipline	Place
2007	18 Mar 2007	Lenzerheide, Switzerland	Giant slalom	2nd
2009	10 Jan 2009	Maribor, Slovenia	Giant slalom	3rd
2010	28 Nov 2009	Aspen, USA	Giant slalom	1st
2010	28 Dec 2009	Lienz, Austria	Giant slalom	1st
2010	24 Jan 2010	Cortina d'Ampezzo, Italy	Giant slalom	3rd
2010	11 Mar 2010	Garmisch-Partenkirchen, Germany	Giant slalom	2nd
2011	23 Oct 2010	Sölden, Austria	Giant slalom	2nd
2011	27 Nov 2010	Aspen, USA	Giant slalom	3rd
2011	28 Dec 2010	Semmering, Austria	Giant slalom	3rd
