= Andrea Zemanová =

Czech skier (born 1993)

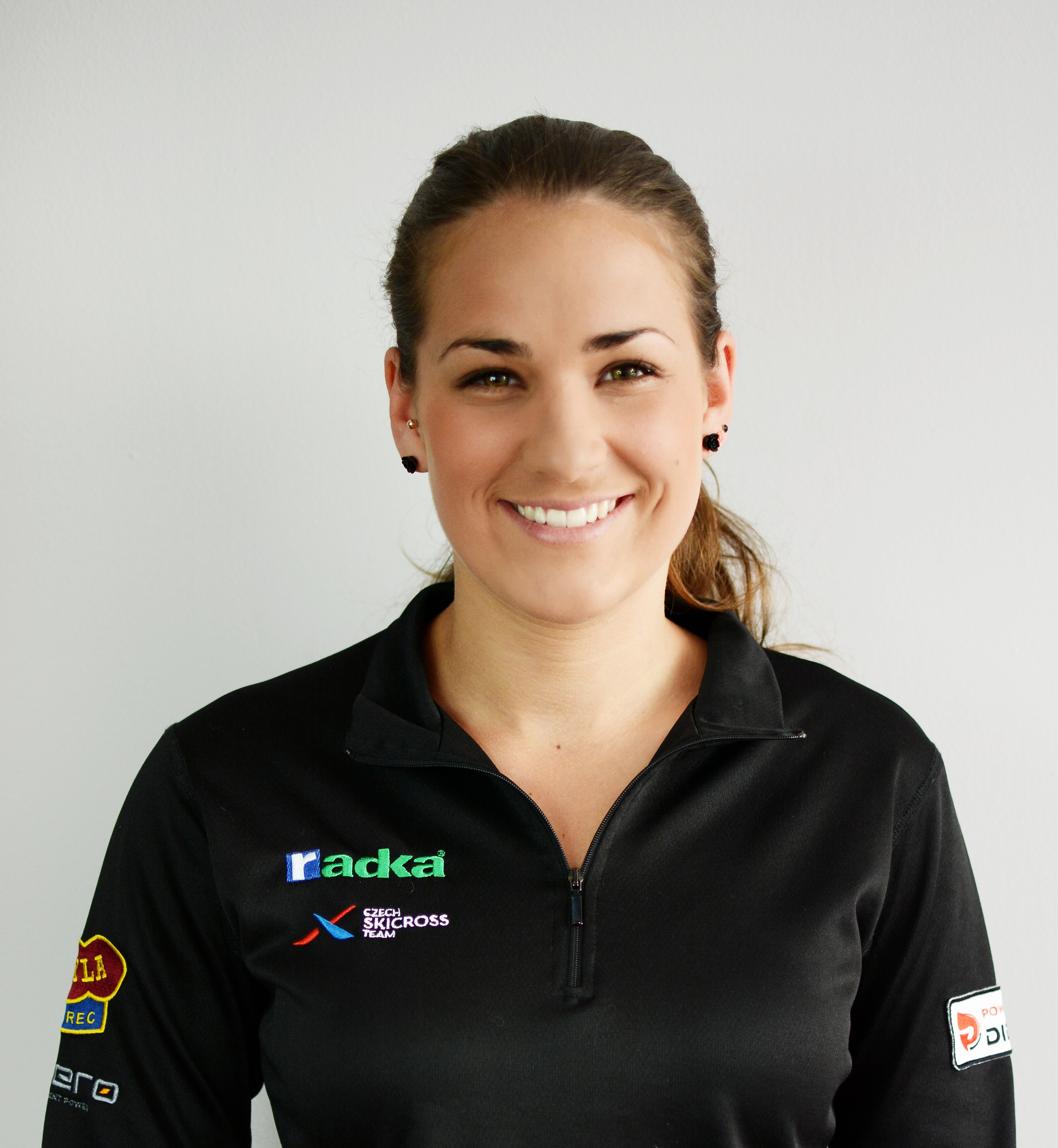

Personal information
- Born: 17 January 1993 (age 33) Vrchlabí, Czech Republic

Sport
- Sport: Skiing

World Cup career
- Indiv. podiums: 1

Andrea Zemanová (born 17 January 1993 in Vrchlabí) is a Czech freestyle skier, specializing in ski cross and alpine skier.

Zemanová competed at the 2014 Winter Olympics for the Czech Republic. She placed 20th in the seeding run for the ski cross event. In the first round, she finished third in her heat and did not advance.

As of September 2015, her best result at the Alpine World Championships is 32nd place in the 2011 Super-G. Her best result at the Freestyle World Championships is 14th, in the 2015 ski cross.

Zemanová made her Freestyle World Cup debut in December 2013. As of September 2015, she has one World Cup podium finish, a silver at Åre during the 2014–15 season. Her best overall finish in the Freestyle World Cup for ski cross is 11th place, achieved in the 2014–15.

Zemanová made her Alpine World Cup debut in December 2010. As of September 2015, she has yet to finish an Alpine World Cup race.

== World Cup podiums ==
Date	Location	Rank	Event
15 February 2015	Åre	2nd place, silver medalist(s)	Ski Cross
