= Gauthier de Tessières =

French alpine skier

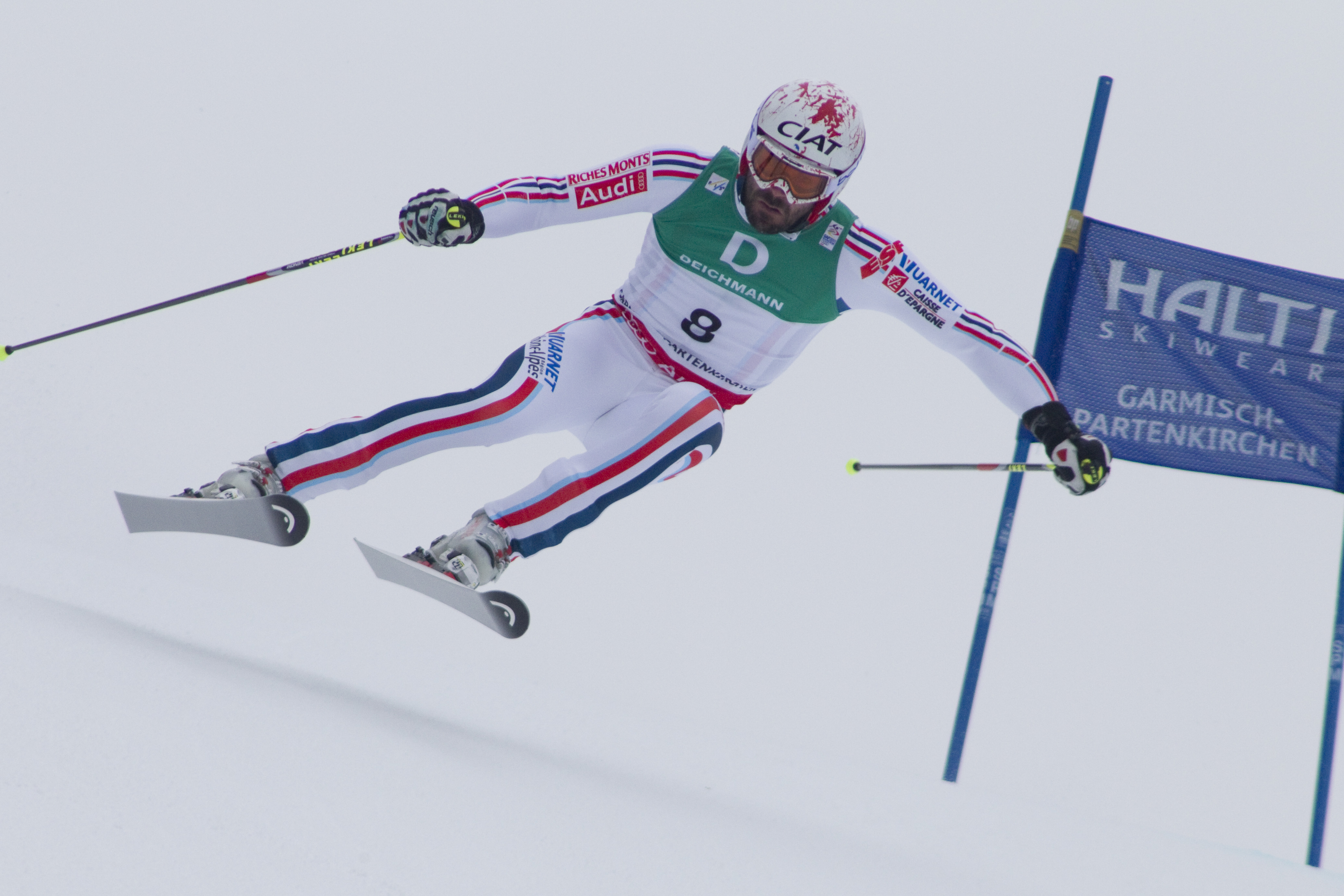

Personal information
- Born: 9 November 1981 (age 44) Clermont-Ferrand, France
- Height: 176 cm (5 ft 9 in)

Skiing career
- Sport: Alpine skiing
- Club: Douanes - SC Alpe d'Huez
- Retired: 2014
- Disciplines: Giant slalom, super-G
- World Cup debut: 9 December 2001 (age 20)

Olympics
- Teams: 2 - (2006–10)

World Championships
- Teams: 5 - (2005–13)
- Medals: 2 (1 gold)

World Cup
- Seasons: 11th - (2003–13)
- Wins: 0
- Podiums: 1 - (1 GS)
- Overall titles: 0 - (57th in 2011)
- Discipline titles: 0 - (15th in GS in 2011)
Medal record
Men's alpine skiing
Representing France
World Championships
| Gold medal – first place | 2011 Garmisch | Team event |
| Silver medal – second place | 2013 Schladming | Super-G |
Junior World Ski Championships
| Bronze medal – third place | 2001 Verbier | Giant slalom |

Gauthier de Tessières (born 9 November 1981) is a World Cup alpine ski racer from France, and has competed in two Winter Olympics and five World Championships. He made his breakthrough on the Alpine Skiing World Cup in a giant slalom in Val-d'Isère in December 2008, where after finishing 30th in the first run to narrowly qualify for the second run, he worked his way up to finish third overall, bettering his previous World Cup personal best of 15th. He won the silver medal in the super-G at the 2013 World Championships, after being added to the French team as an injury replacement. De Tessières announced his retirement from competition in January 2014 after he was not selected for the 2014 Winter Olympics.

== World Cup results ==
=== Top ten finishes ===
- 1 podium – (1 GS)
- 5 top tens

| Season | Date | Location | Discipline | Place |
|---|---|---|---|---|
| 2009 | 13 Dec 2008 | Val-d'Isère, France | Giant slalom | 3rd |
| 2011 | 19 Dec 2010 | Alta Badia, Italy | Giant slalom | 8th |
| 2011 | 8 Jan 2011 | Adelboden, Switzerland | Giant slalom | 9th |
| 2013 | 28 Oct 2012 | Sölden, Austria | Giant slalom | 7th |
| 2013 | 1 Dec 2012 | Beaver Creek, USA | Super-G | 8th |

=== Season standings ===
| Season | Age | Overall | Slalom | Giant slalom | Super-G | Downhill | Combined |
|---|---|---|---|---|---|---|---|
| 2002 | 20 | 139 | — | 51 | — | — | — |
| 2003 | 21 | 108 | — | 40 | — | — | — |
| 2004 | 22 | 111 | — | 41 | — | — | — |
| 2005 | 23 | 86 | — | 29 | — | — | — |
| 2006 | 24 | 112 | — | 39 | 45 | — | — |
| 2007 | 25 | 120 | — | — | 35 | — | — |
| 2008 | 26 | 111 | — | 42 | — | — | — |
| 2009 | 27 | 71 | — | 22 | — | — | — |
| 2010 | 28 | 86 | — | 29 | 38 | — | — |
| 2011 | 29 | 57 | — | 15 | 32 | — | — |
| 2012 | 30 | 80 | — | 32 | 38 | — | — |
| 2013 | 31 | 64 | — | 28 | 21 | — | — |
| 2014 | 32 | 148 | — | 54 | — | — | — |
