= Cyprien Richard =

French alpine skier

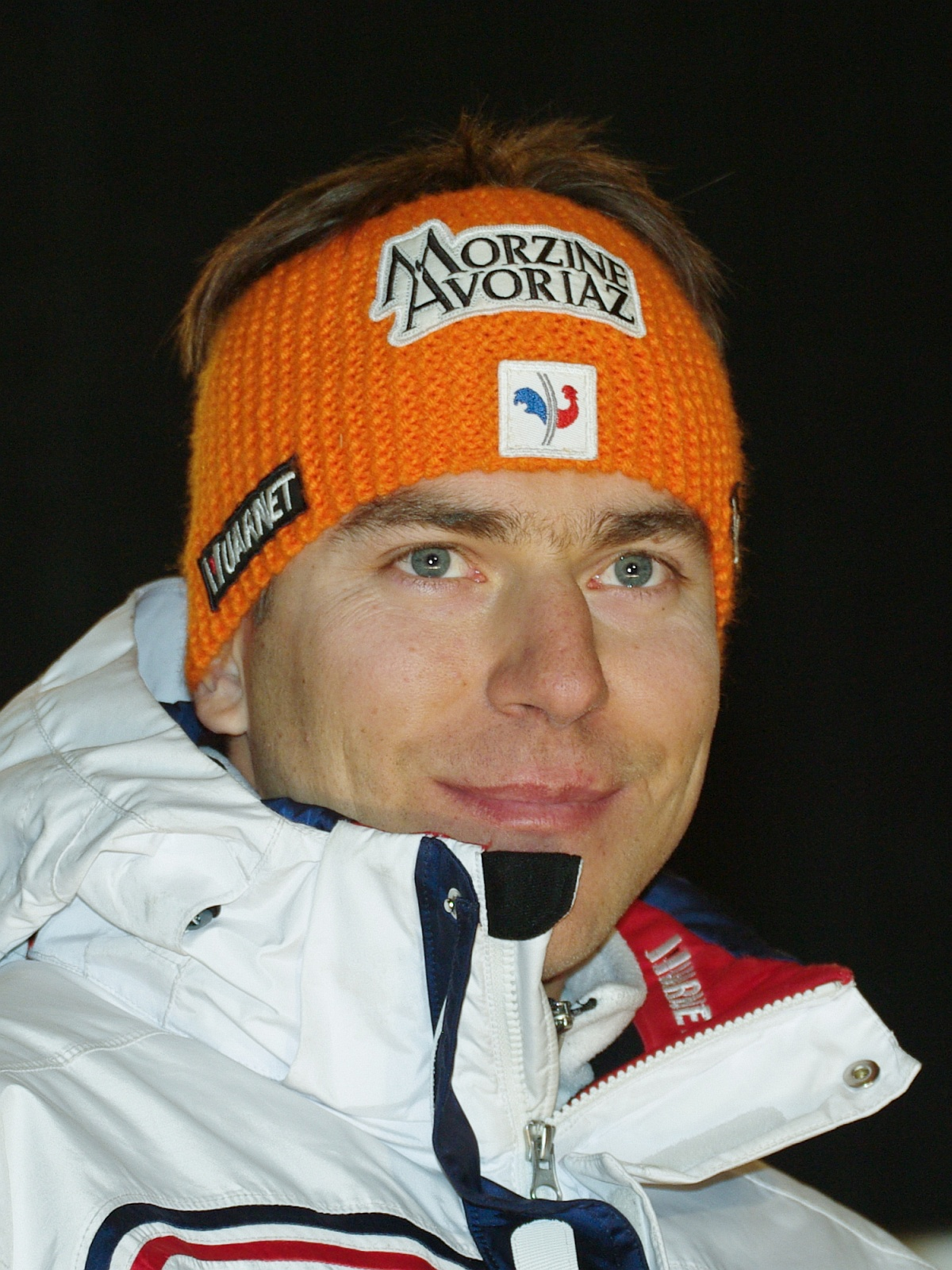
- Richard in 2011

Personal information
- Born: 27 January 1979 (age 47) Thonon-les-Bains, Haute Savoie, France
- Height: 1.77 m (5 ft 10 in)
- Website: cyprien-richard.fr

Skiing career
- Sport: Alpine skiing
- Club: Douanes – SC Morzine Avoriaz
- Retired: 5 March 2016 (age 37)
- Disciplines: Giant slalom
- World Cup debut: 17 December 2000 (age 20)

Olympics
- Teams: 1 – (2014)
- Medals: 0

World Championships
- Teams: 3 – (2009, 2011, 2013)
- Medals: 2 (1 gold)

World Cup
- Seasons: 9 – (2008–2016)
- Wins: 1 – (1 GS)
- Podiums: 4 – (4 GS)
- Overall titles: 0 – (26th in 2011)
- Discipline titles: 0 – (3rd in GS, 2011)
Medal record
Men's alpine skiing
Representing France
World Championships
| Gold medal – first place | 2011 Garmisch | Team event |
| Silver medal – second place | 2011 Garmisch | Giant slalom |

Cyprien Richard (born 27 January 1979) is a retired French World Cup alpine ski racer.

Born in Thonon-les-Bains, Haute Savoie, Richard attained four World Cup podiums, all in giant slalom, with one victory, at Adelboden, Switzerland, a tie with Aksel Lund Svindal for first place. He was also French national champion in giant slalom in 2008.

== World Cup ==
=== Season standings ===
| Season | Age | Overall | Slalom | Giant slalom | Super-G | Downhill | Combined |
|---|---|---|---|---|---|---|---|
| 2008 | 29 | 54 | — | 11 | — | — | — |
| 2009 | 30 | 57 | — | 15 | — | — | — |
| 2010 | 31 | 45 | — | 11 | — | — | — |
| 2011 | 32 | 26 | — | 3 | — | — | — |
| 2012 | 33 | 42 | — | 8 | — | — | — |
| 2013 | 34 | 71 | — | 23 | — | — | — |
| 2014 | 35 | 63 | — | 24 | — | — | — |
| 2015 | 36 | 116 | — | 32 | — | — | — |
| 2016 | 37 | 91 | — | 33 | — | — | — |

=== Race podiums ===
- 1 win – (1 GS)
- 4 podiums – (4 GS)

| Season | Date | Location | Discipline | Place |
|---|---|---|---|---|
| 2008 | 14 Mar 2008 | Bormio, Italy | Giant slalom | 3rd |
| 2010 | 20 Dec 2009 | Alta Badia, Italy | Giant slalom | 3rd |
| 2011 | 19 Dec 2010 | Alta Badia, Italy | Giant slalom | 2nd |
| 2011 | 8 Jan 2011 | Adelboden, Switzerland | Giant slalom | 1st |

== World Championships ==
| Year | Age | Slalom | Giant slalom | Super-G | Downhill | Combined | Team event |
|---|---|---|---|---|---|---|---|
| 2009 | 30 | — | DNF1 | — | — | — | — |
| 2011 | 32 | — | 2 | — | — | — | 1 |
| 2013 | 34 | — | 19 | — | — | — | — |

== Olympics ==
| Year | Age | Slalom | Giant slalom | Super-G | Downhill | Combined |
|---|---|---|---|---|---|---|
| 2010 | 31 | — | DNF2 | — | — | — |
