= Romed Baumann =

German alpine skier

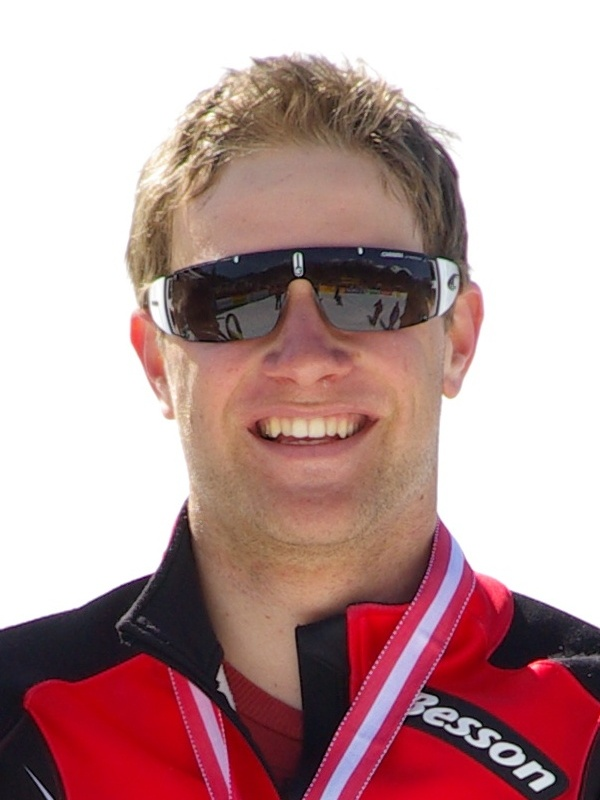
- Baumann in March 2008

Personal information
- Born: 14 January 1986 (age 40) St. Johann, Austria
- Height: 1.84 m (6 ft 0 in)
- Website: romed-baumann.com

Skiing career
- Country: Germany (since fall 2019); Austria (until fall 2019)
- Sport: Alpine skiing
- Club: WSV Kiefersfelden
- Retired: 28 February 2026 (age 40)
- Disciplines: Downhill, Combined, Super-G
- World Cup debut: 10 March 2004 (age 18)

Olympics
- Teams: 3 – (2010, 2014, 2022)
- Medals: 0

World Championships
- Teams: 8 – (2007–2015, 2021–2025)
- Medals: 2 (0 gold)

World Cup
- Seasons: 22 – (2004, 2006–2026)
- Wins: 2 – (2 SC)
- Podiums: 11 – (5 DH, 1 SG, 5 AC)
- Overall titles: 0 – (7th in 2011)
- Discipline titles: 0 – (3rd in K, 2009)
Medal record
Men's alpine skiing
Representing Germany
World Championships
Silver medal – second place	2021 Cortina d'Ampezzo	Super-G
Representing Austria
World Championships
Silver medal – second place	2011 Garmisch-Partenkirchen	Team event
Bronze medal – third place	2013 Schladming	Combined
Junior World Championships
Gold medal – first place	2004 Maribor	Downhill
Gold medal – first place	2006 Quebec	Combined
Silver medal – second place	2006 Quebec	Downhill
Silver medal – second place	2006 Quebec	Slalom

Romed Baumann (born 14 January 1986) is a retired German and former Austrian World Cup alpine ski racer from St. Johann in Tyrol.

== Career ==
=== Competing for Austria ===
Baumann debuted in the World Cup at the 2004 season finals, as a junior world champion in downhill. He has started skiing in all disciplines, however later found success in downhill and combined, winning two combined races and finishing in top 10 season standings in downhill on multiple occasions. He also competed in super-G, reaching the podium once.

=== Nationality change ===
He skied for Austria for many years, but he chose to compete under the German flag prior to the 2019/20 season due to not being included in the Austrian A-team. Competing for Germany, he won a silver medal in the super-G in 2021 World Championships in Cortina, Italy, and reached a World Cup podium two years later, in downhill.

=== Retirement ===
He retired on 28 February 2026, after a downhill race in Garmisch, holding the record of 167 downhill starts in total. Initially, he planned to compete in a super-G race a day later, however it was canceled due to weather forecast.

== World Cup results ==
=== Season standings ===
Season	Age	Overall	Slalom	Giant Slalom	Super G	Downhill	Combined
2004	18	46	—	—	—	58	—
2005	19	—N/a					
2006	20	—N/a					
2007	21	46	40	—	—	58	6
2008	22	42	46	31	—	28	12
2009	23	19	63	10	52	25	3
2010	24	19	—	14	31	25	6
2011	25	7	—	17	7	5	7
2012	26	13	—	22	21	8	3
2013	27	27	—	34	20	17	6
2014	28	37	—	—	17	21	25
2015	29	14	—	—	13	9	13
2016	30	18	—	—	15	16	8
2017	31	42	—	—	30	19	13
2018	32	47	—	—	32	22	12
2019	33	90	—	—	—	51	8
2020	34	61	—	—	35	22	27
2021	35	24	—	—	15	6	—N/a
2022	36	35	—	—	17	19	—N/a
2023	37	22	—	—	22	8	—N/a
2024	38	88	—	—	46	37	—N/a
2025	39	66	—	—	29	25	—N/a
2026	40	105	—	—	43	44	—N/a

Standings through 11 March 2026

=== Race podiums ===
- 2 wins – (2 AC)
- 11 podiums – (5 DH, 1 SG, 5 AC (4 SC, 1 K)), 82 top tens

Season	Date	Location	Discipline	Place
2007	10 Dec 2006	Reiteralm, Austria	Super combined	2nd
2009	22 Feb 2009	Sestriere, Italy	Super combined	1st
2010	11 Dec 2009	Val d'Isère, France	Super combined	3rd
2011	28 Nov 2010	Lake Louise, Canada	Super G	3rd
2011	18 Dec 2010	Val Gardena, Italy	Downhill	2nd
2011	23 Jan 2011	Kitzbühel, Austria	Combined	3rd
2012	21 Jan 2012	Kitzbühel, Austria	Downhill	2nd
2012	4 Feb 2012	Chamonix, France	Downhill	2nd
2012	5 Feb 2012	Chamonix, France	Super combined	1st
2015	28 Feb 2015	Garmisch-Partenkirchen, Germany	Downhill	2nd
2023	15 Mar 2023	Soldeu, Andorra	Downhill	2nd

== World Championship results ==
Year	Age	Slalom	Giant slalom	Super-G	Downhill	Combined
2007	21	—	—	—	—	7
2009	23	—	—	—	—	8
2011	25	—	11	6	4	DNF1
2013	27	—	—	8	—	3
2015	29	—	—	—	—	4
2021	35	—	—	2	14	—
2023	37	—	—	27	19	DNS2
2025	39	—	—	22	20	—

== Olympic results ==
Year	Age	Slalom	Giant slalom	Super-G	Downhill	Combined
2010	24	—	8	—	—	DNF1
2014	28	—	—	—	—	14
2018	32	did not participate				
2022	36	—	—	7	13	—
