= Thomas Fanara =

French alpine skier

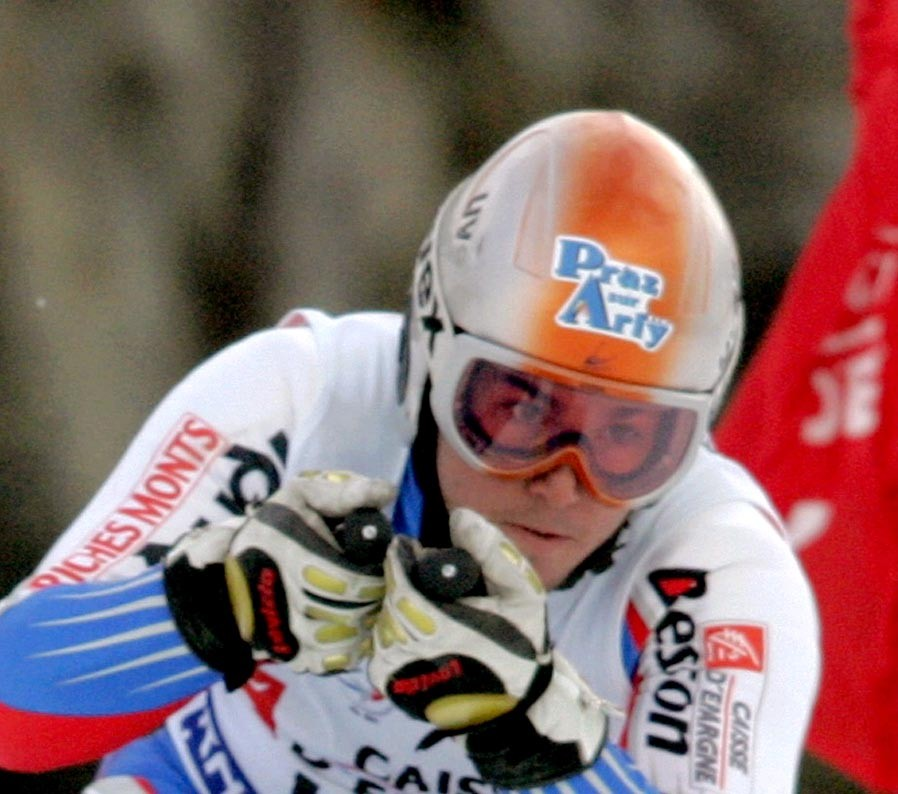
- Fanara, c. 2009

Personal information
- Born: 24 April 1981 (age 45) Annecy, Haute-Savoie, France
- Height: 170 cm (5 ft 7 in)

Skiing career
- Sport: Alpine skiing
- Club: Douanes – C.S. Praz-sur-Arly
- Retired: 16 March 2019 (age 37)
- Disciplines: Giant slalom
- World Cup debut: 11 January 2005 (age 23)

Olympics
- Teams: 3 – (2006, 2014, 2018)
- Medals: 0

World Championships
- Teams: 6 – (2007–15, 2019)
- Medals: 1 (1 gold)

World Cup
- Seasons: 15 – (2005–2019)
- Wins: 1 – (1 GS)
- Podiums: 14 – (14 GS)
- Overall titles: 0 – (23rd in 2016)
- Discipline titles: 0 – (4th in GS, 2014)
Medal record
Men's alpine skiing
Representing France
World Championships
Gold medal – first place	2011 Garmisch	Team event

Thomas Fanara (born 24 April 1981) is a former French World Cup alpine ski racer.

Born in Annecy, Haute-Savoie, Fanara specialised in giant slalom; his only win came in March 2016 at the giant slalom finals in St. Moritz, Switzerland. He is the oldest racer to reach a World Cup podium in giant slalom, and competed for France at three Winter Olympics and six World Championships. He retired from competition at the end of the 2018–19 season.

== World Cup ==
Fanara has started over 70 World cup races, mostly in giant slalom but also in slalom, and has been on the podium fourteen times. For some time he held the record for most World Cup podium finishes without a win until his victory at the World Cup finals in St. Moritz in 2016. In December 2007, he fell and hurt himself in the second run after winning the first run of a race in Bad Kleinkirchheim, but finished. Two years later in December 2009, Fanara incurred a season-ending injury to his left knee after a spectacular fall during a race in Beaver Creek, two months before the 2010 Winter Olympics.

Following his World Cup win in St. Moritz, Fanara suffered an injury which kept him out of competition for the 2016–17 season. However, he subsequently made a successful return, taking a number of podium finished in his final season.

=== Season standings ===
Season	Age	Overall	Slalom	Giant slalom	Super-G	Downhill	Combined
2005	23	136	—	54	—	—	—
2006	24	59	—	18	—	—	—
2007	25	78	—	17	—	—	—
2008	26	83	—	25	—	—	—
2009	27	48	—	13	—	—	—
2010	28	138	—	50	—	—	—
2011	29	37	—	6	—	—	—
2012	30	48	—	12	—	—	—
2013	31	29	—	5	—	—	—
2014	32	29	—	4	—	—	—
2015	33	27	—	5	—	—	—
2016	34	23	—	6	—	—	—
2017	35	73	—	23	—	—	—
2018	36	60	—	18	—	—	—
2019	37	30	—	7	—	—	—

Standings through 24 February 2019

=== Race podiums ===
- 1 win – (1 GS)
- 14 podiums – (14 GS)

Season	Date	Location	Discipline	Place
2011	19 Dec 2010	Alta Badia, Italy	Giant slalom	3rd
2011	8 Jan 2011	Adelboden, Switzerland	Giant slalom	3rd
2013	16 Dec 2012	Alta Badia, Italy	Giant slalom	3rd
2014	14 Dec 2013	Val-d'Isère, France	Giant slalom	2nd
2014	12 Jan 2014	Adelboden, Switzerland	Giant slalom	2nd
2015	21 Dec 2014	Alta Badia, Italy	Giant slalom	3rd
2015	14 Mar 2015	Kranjska Gora, Slovenia	Giant slalom	3rd
2015	21 Mar 2015	Méribel, France	Giant slalom	3rd
2016	25 Oct 2015	Sölden, Austria	Giant slalom	2nd
2016	26 Feb 2016	Hinterstoder, Austria	Giant slalom	3rd
2016	19 Mar 2016	St. Moritz, Switzerland	Giant slalom	1st
2019	16 Dec 2018	Alta Badia, Italy	Giant slalom	2nd
2019	12 Jan 2019	Adelboden, Switzerland	Giant slalom	3rd
2019	24 Feb 2019	Bansko, Bulgaria	Giant slalom	3rd

== World championships ==
Fanara has competed in four World Championships in the giant slalom discipline. In 2007 in Åre, Sweden, he finished 16th, but on home country snow in 2009 in Val-d'Isère, France, he did not finish the first run. At Garmisch-Partenkirchen, Germany, he finished sixth in 2011 but failed to finish the first run in 2013 at Schladming, Austria. Fanara participated in the team event in 2011 at Garmisch and earned a gold medal.

Year	Age	Slalom	Giant slalom	Super-G	Downhill	Combined
2007	25	—	16	—	—	—
2009	27	—	DNF1	—	—	—
2011	29	—	6	—	—	—
2013	31	—	DNF1	—	—	—
2015	33	—	DNF1	—	—	—
2017	35	Injured: did not compete				
2019	37	—	DNF2	—	—	—

== Olympics ==
At the Winter Olympics, Fanara did not finish the first run of the giant slalom in 2006 and was injured two months prior the 2010 Games and did not compete.

Year	Age	Slalom	Giant slalom	Super-G	Downhill	Combined
2006	24	—	DNF1	—	—	—
2010	28	injured, did not compete				
2014	32	—	9	—	—	—
2018	36	—	5	—	—	—

== National championships ==
Fanara reached the podium of French national championships four times, all in giant slalom. In 2005 he was third; in 2006 he was second; and he won in 2007 and 2009.
