= Tea Palić =

Croatian alpine skier (born 1991)

Tea Palić (born April 29, 1991) is a former Croatian alpine skier who competed in slalom and giant slalom. She competed for Croatia at the 2010 Winter Olympics. She finished 36th in the giant slalom, her only event at the Olympics.
