= Taïna Barioz =

French alpine skier (born 1988)

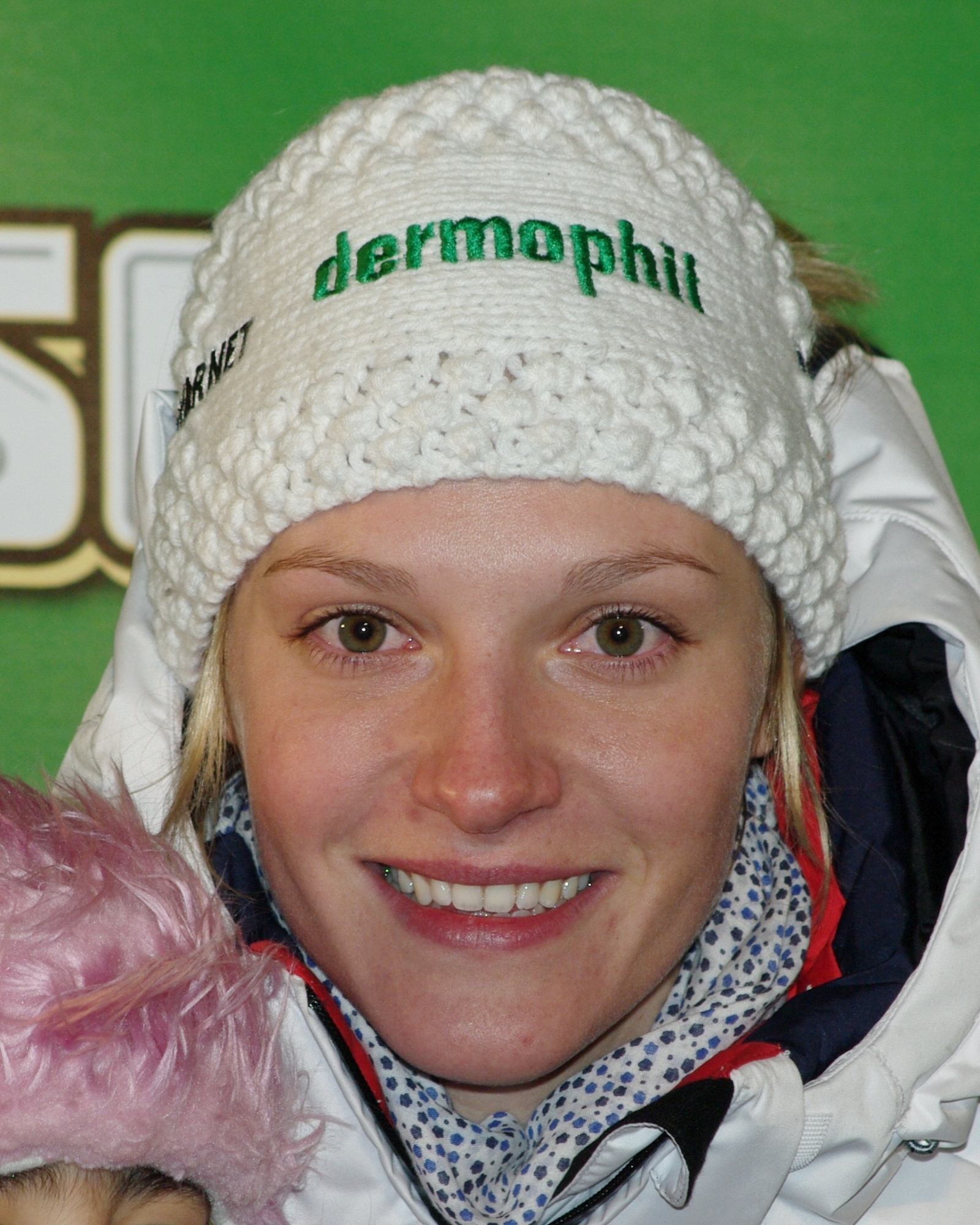
- Barioz in December 2010

Personal information
- Born: 2 June 1988 (age 38) Papeete, Tahiti, France

Skiing career
- Sport: Alpine skiing
- Disciplines: Giant slalom

Olympics
- Teams: France - 2018

World Cup
- Podiums: 2
Medal record
Women's alpine skiing
Representing France
World Championships
Gold medal – first place	2011 Garmisch-Partenkirchen	Team event

Taïna Barioz (born 2 June 1988, in Papeete, Tahiti) is a French alpine skier.

She is the daughter of French ice hockey player Didier Barioz.

Barioz won two podiums in Alpine Skiing World Cup, both in giant slalom: 3rd place in Lienz, Austria (December 2009), and then 2nd place at the World Cup finals in St. Moritz, Switzerland (March 2016).

Barioz placed 1st in the 2014 FIS NorAms.

She also competed at the 2018 Winter Olympics in PyeongChang, South Korea where she finished in 19th place, as second best of the French skiers in the giant slalom competition.
