= 2010–11 FIS Alpine Ski World Cup =

International sports competition

FIS Alpine Ski World Cup 2010/11
| Discipline | Men | Women |
| Overall | (Croatia) Ivica Kostelić | (Germany) Maria Riesch |
| Downhill | (Switzerland) Didier Cuche | (United States) Lindsey Vonn |
| Super-G | (Switzerland) Didier Cuche | (United States) Lindsey Vonn |
| Giant slalom | (United States) Ted Ligety | (Germany) Viktoria Rebensburg |
| Slalom | (Croatia) Ivica Kostelić | (Austria) Marlies Schild |
| Super combined | (Croatia) Ivica Kostelić | (United States) Lindsey Vonn |
| Nations Cup | Austria | Austria |
- Nations Cup Overall: Austria

Competition
| Locations | 19 | 18 |
| Individual | 36 | 33 |
| Mixed | 1 | 1 |
| Cancelled | 3 | 5 |
| Rescheduled | 1 | 3 |

2011 World Cup Champions

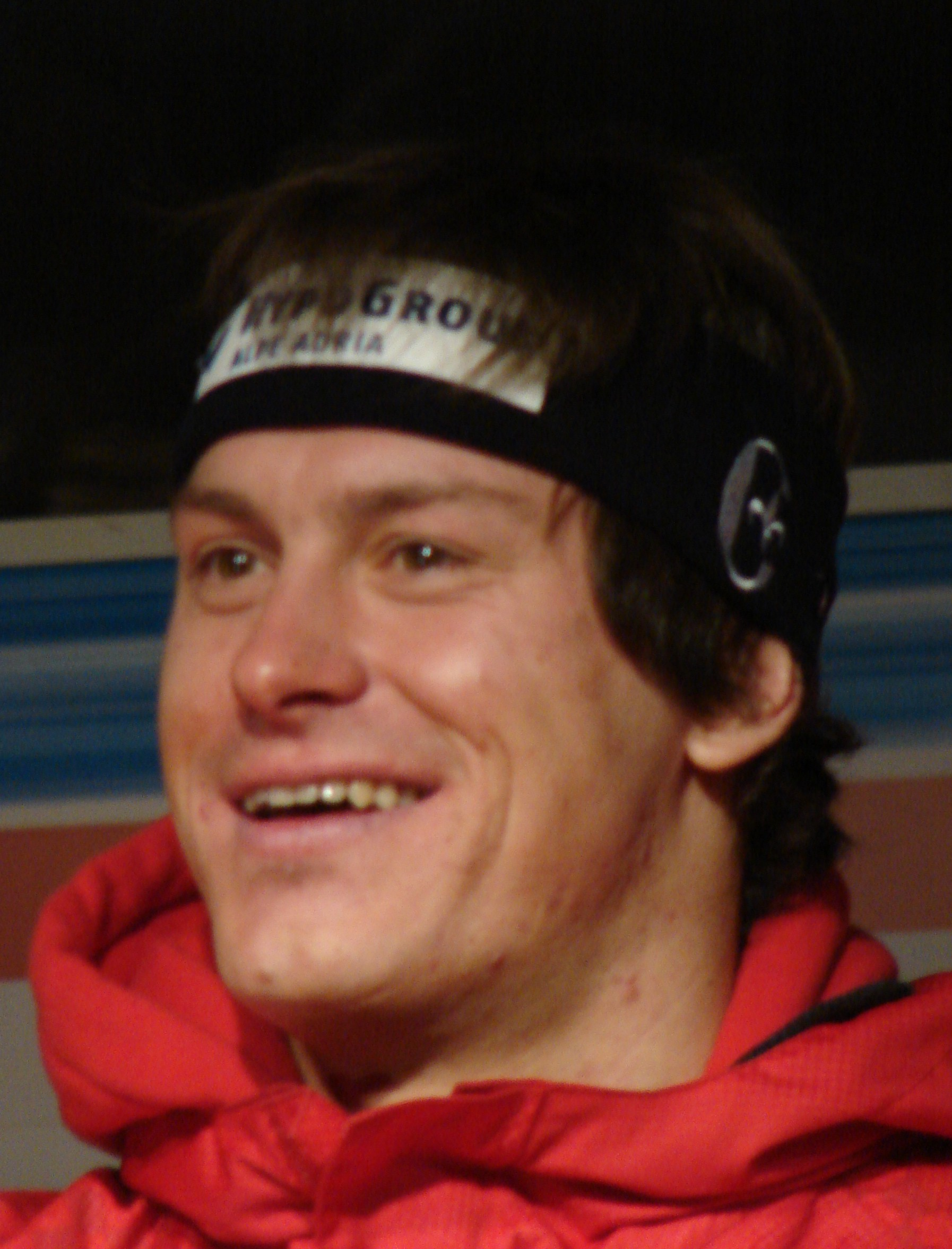
Ivica Kostelić became the first man from Croatia to win the overall World Cup.

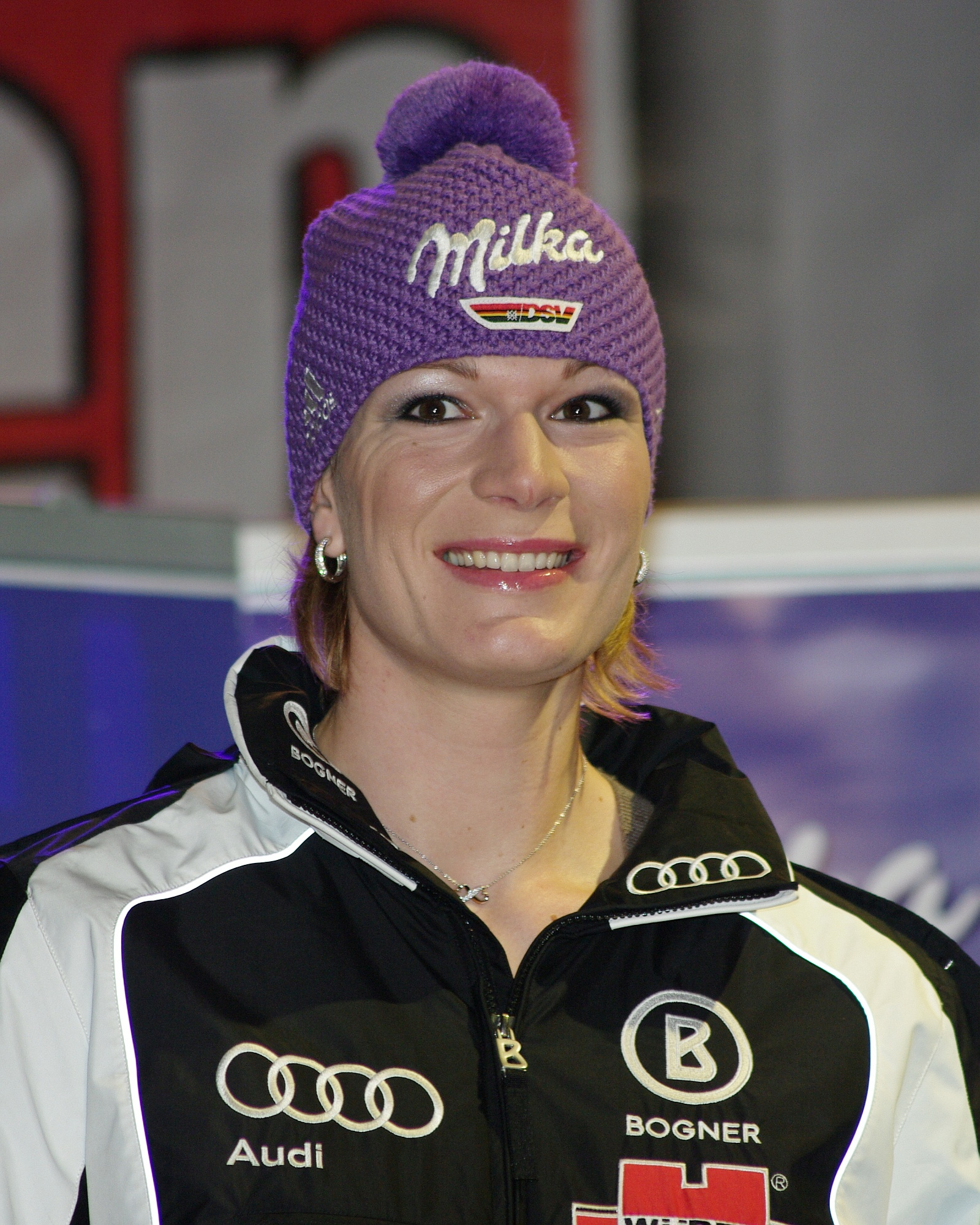
Maria Riesch became the first German woman since Katja Seizinger in 1998 to win the overall World Cup.

The 45th World Cup season began on 23 October 2010, in Sölden, Austria, and concluded on 20 March 2011, at the World Cup finals in Lenzerheide, Switzerland.

Being an odd-numbered year, the biennial World Championships took place in February. The 2011 World Championships were held between 8–20 February at Garmisch Classic in Garmisch-Partenkirchen, Bavaria, Germany.

The season saw the introduction of a new event to the World Cup, the city event. The race in parallel giant slalom took place in Munich, Germany.

The overall titles were won by Maria Riesch of Germany and Ivica Kostelić of Croatia; both skiers winning their first overall crowns. Kostelić secured his overall victory several races before the end of the season while Riesch and Lindsey Vonn of the United States were close together before the finals at Lenzerheide, Switzerland. Riesch had a significant lead after the World Championship but Vonn caught up and took the lead before the last slalom race. Slovenia's Tina Maze won her first slalom in that race, Riesch's fourth place compared to Vonn's thirteenth gave her a three-point advantage. The cancellation of the last race – one of four to be cancelled at Lenzerheide – meant that Riesch won the title.

== Calendar ==
=== Men ===
Event key: DH – Downhill, SL – Slalom, GS – Giant slalom, SG – Super giant slalom, KB – Classic Combined, SC – Super combined, CE – City Event (Parallel)
| Race | Season | Date | Place | Type | Winner | Second | Third | Details |
|---|---|---|---|---|---|---|---|---|
| | | 24 October 2010 | (Austria) Sölden | GS _{cnx} | cancelled after 1st run; fog & wind | | | |
| 1408 | 1 | 14 November 2010 | (Finland) Levi | SL _{401} | (France) Jean-Baptiste Grange | (Sweden) André Myhrer | (Croatia) Ivica Kostelić | |
| 1409 | 2 | 27 November 2010 | (Canada) Lake Louise | DH _{405} | (Austria) Michael Walchhofer | (Austria) Mario Scheiber (Norway) Aksel Lund Svindal | | |
| 1410 | 3 | 28 November 2010 | (Canada) Lake Louise | SG _{153} | (Switzerland) Tobias Grünenfelder | (Switzerland) Carlo Janka | (Austria) Romed Baumann | |
| | | 3 December 2010 | (United States) Beaver Creek | DH _{cnx} | strong winds; replaced in Kvitfjell on 11 March 2011 | | | |
| 1411 | 4 | 4 December 2010 | (United States) Beaver Creek | SG _{154} | (Austria) Georg Streitberger | (France) Adrien Théaux | (Switzerland) Didier Cuche | |
| 1412 | 5 | 5 December 2010 | (United States) Beaver Creek | GS _{341} | (United States) Ted Ligety | (Norway) Kjetil Jansrud | (Austria) Marcel Hirscher | |
| 1413 | 6 | 11 December 2010 | (France) Val-d'Isère | GS _{342} | (United States) Ted Ligety | (Norway) Aksel Lund Svindal | (Italy) Massimiliano Blardone | |
| 1414 | 7 | 12 December 2010 | (France) Val-d'Isère | SL _{402} | (Austria) Marcel Hirscher | (Austria) Benjamin Raich | (France) Steve Missillier | |
| 1415 | 8 | 17 December 2010 | (Italy) Val Gardena | SG _{155} | (Austria) Michael Walchhofer | (Germany) Stephan Keppler | (Canada) Erik Guay | |
| 1416 | 9 | 18 December 2010 | (Italy) Val Gardena | DH _{406} | (Switzerland) Silvan Zurbriggen | (Austria) Romed Baumann | (Switzerland) Didier Cuche | |
| 1417 | 10 | 19 December 2010 | (Italy) Alta Badia | GS _{343} | (United States) Ted Ligety | (France) Cyprien Richard | (France) Thomas Fanara | |
| 1418 | 11 | 29 December 2010 | (Italy) Bormio | DH _{407} | (Austria) Michael Walchhofer | (Switzerland) Silvan Zurbriggen | (Italy) Christof Innerhofer | |
| 1419 | 12 | 2 January 2011 | (Germany) Munich | CE _{001} | (Croatia) Ivica Kostelić | (France) Julien Lizeroux | (United States) Bode Miller | |
| 1420 | 13 | 6 January 2011 | (Croatia) Zagreb | SL _{403} | (Sweden) André Myhrer | (Croatia) Ivica Kostelić | (Sweden) Mattias Hargin | |
| 1421 | 14 | 8 January 2011 | (Switzerland) Adelboden | GS _{344} | (France) Cyprien Richard (Norway) Aksel Lund Svindal | | (France) Thomas Fanara | |
| 1422 | 15 | 9 January 2011 | (Switzerland) Adelboden | SL _{404} | (Croatia) Ivica Kostelić | (Austria) Marcel Hirscher | (Austria) Reinfried Herbst | |
| 1423 | 16 | 14 January 2011 | (Switzerland) Wengen | SC _{109} | (Croatia) Ivica Kostelić | (Switzerland) Carlo Janka | (Norway) Aksel Lund Svindal | |
| 1424 | 17 | 15 January 2011 | (Switzerland) Wengen | DH _{408} | (Austria) Klaus Kröll | (Switzerland) Didier Cuche | (Switzerland) Carlo Janka | |
| 1425 | 18 | 16 January 2011 | (Switzerland) Wengen | SL _{405} | (Croatia) Ivica Kostelić | (Austria) Marcel Hirscher | (France) Jean-Baptiste Grange | |
| 1426 | 19 | 21 January 2011 | (Austria) Kitzbühel | SG _{156} | (Croatia) Ivica Kostelić | (Austria) Georg Streitberger | (Norway) Aksel Lund Svindal | |
| 1427 | 20 | 22 January 2011 | (Austria) Kitzbühel | DH _{409} | (Switzerland) Didier Cuche | (United States) Bode Miller | (France) Adrien Théaux | |
| 1428 | 21 | 23 January 2011 | (Austria) Kitzbühel | SL _{406} | (France) Jean-Baptiste Grange | (Croatia) Ivica Kostelić | (Italy) Giuliano Razzoli | |
| 1429 | 22 | 23 January 2011 | (Austria) Kitzbühel | KB _{110} | (Croatia) Ivica Kostelić | (Switzerland) Silvan Zurbriggen | (Austria) Romed Baumann | |
| 1430 | 23 | 25 January 2011 | (Austria) Schladming | SL _{407} | (France) Jean-Baptiste Grange | (Sweden) André Myhrer | (Sweden) Mattias Hargin | |
| 1431 | 24 | 29 January 2011 | (France) Chamonix | DH _{410} | (Switzerland) Didier Cuche | (Italy) Dominik Paris | (Austria) Klaus Kröll | |
| 1432 | 25 | 30 January 2011 | (France) Chamonix | SC _{111} | (Croatia) Ivica Kostelić | (Croatia) Natko Zrnčić-Dim | (Norway) Aksel Lund Svindal | |
| 1433 | 26 | 5 February 2011 | (Austria) Hinterstoder | SG _{157} | (Austria) Hannes Reichelt | (Austria) Benjamin Raich | (United States) Bode Miller | |
| 1434 | 27 | 6 February 2011 | (Austria) Hinterstoder | GS _{345} | (Austria) Philipp Schörghofer | (Norway) Kjetil Jansrud | (Switzerland) Carlo Janka | |
2011 World Championships (8–20 February)
| 1435 | 28 | 26 February 2011 | (Bulgaria) Bansko | SC _{112} | (Italy) Christof Innerhofer | (Germany) Felix Neureuther | (France) Thomas Mermillod-Blondin | |
| 1436 | 29 | 27 February 2011 | (Bulgaria) Bansko | SL _{408} | (Austria) Mario Matt | (Austria) Reinfried Herbst | (France) Jean-Baptiste Grange | |
| 1437 | 30 | 5 March 2011 | (Slovenia) Kranjska Gora | GS _{346} | (Switzerland) Carlo Janka | (France) Alexis Pinturault | (United States) Ted Ligety | |
| 1438 | 31 | 6 March 2011 | (Slovenia) Kranjska Gora | SL _{409} | (Austria) Mario Matt | (United States) Nolan Kasper (Sweden) Axel Bäck | | |
| 1439 | 32 | (Note: Downhill from Beaver Creek was rescheduled to Kvitfjell on 11 March 2011)11 March 2011 | (Norway) Kvitfjell | DH _{411} | (Switzerland) Beat Feuz | (Canada) Erik Guay | (Austria) Michael Walchhofer | |
| 1440 | 33 | 12 March 2011 | (Norway) Kvitfjell | DH _{412} | (Austria) Michael Walchhofer | (Austria) Klaus Kröll | (Switzerland) Beat Feuz | |
| 1441 | 34 | 13 March 2011 | (Norway) Kvitfjell | SG _{158} | (Switzerland) Didier Cuche | (Austria) Klaus Kröll | (Austria) Joachim Puchner | |
| 1442 | 35 | 16 March 2011 | (Switzerland) Lenzerheide | DH _{413} | (France) Adrien Théaux | (Austria) Joachim Puchner | (Norway) Aksel Lund Svindal | |
| | | 17 March 2011 | (Switzerland) Lenzerheide | SG _{cnx} | rain | | | |
| | | 18 March 2011 | (Switzerland) Lenzerheide | GS _{cnx} | poor conditions | | | |
| 1443 | 36 | 19 March 2011 | (Switzerland) Lenzerheide | SL _{410} | (Italy) Giuliano Razzoli | (Austria) Mario Matt | (Germany) Felix Neureuther | |

=== Women ===
Event key: DH – Downhill, SL – Slalom, GS – Giant slalom, SG – Super giant slalom, SC – Super combined, CE – City Event (Parallel)
| Race | Season | Date | Place | Type | Winner | Second | Third | Details |
|---|---|---|---|---|---|---|---|---|
| 1318 | 1 | 23 October 2010 | (Austria) Sölden | GS _{340} | (Germany) Viktoria Rebensburg | (Germany) Kathrin Hölzl | (Italy) Manuela Mölgg | |
| 1319 | 2 | 13 November 2010 | (Finland) Levi | SL _{382} | (Austria) Marlies Schild | (Germany) Maria Riesch | (Finland) Tanja Poutiainen | |
| 1320 | 3 | 27 November 2010 | (United States) Aspen | GS _{341} | (France) Tessa Worley | (Germany) Viktoria Rebensburg | (Germany) Kathrin Hölzl | |
| 1321 | 4 | 28 November 2010 | (United States) Aspen | SL _{383} | (Sweden) Maria Pietilä Holmner | (Germany) Maria Riesch | (Finland) Tanja Poutiainen | |
| 1322 | 5 | 3 December 2010 | (Canada) Lake Louise | DH _{337} | (Germany) Maria Riesch | (United States) Lindsey Vonn | (Austria) Elisabeth Görgl | |
| 1323 | 6 | 4 December 2010 | (Canada) Lake Louise | DH _{338} | (Germany) Maria Riesch | (United States) Lindsey Vonn | (Switzerland) Dominique Gisin | |
| 1324 | 7 | 5 December 2010 | (Canada) Lake Louise | SG _{172} | (United States) Lindsey Vonn | (Germany) Maria Riesch | (United States) Julia Mancuso | |
| | | 11 December 2010 | (Switzerland) St. Moritz | SG _{cnx} | cancelled during 1st run, strong winds; replaced in Val-d'Isère on 17 December 2010 | | | |
| 1325 | 8 | 12 December 2010 | (Switzerland) St. Moritz | GS _{342} | (France) Tessa Worley | (Finland) Tanja Poutiainen | (Slovenia) Tina Maze | |
| | | (Note: Super giant slalom from St. Moritz was rescheduled to Val-d'Isère on 17 December 2010)17 December 2010 | (France) Val-d'Isère | SG _{cnx} | canceled; heavy snow; replaced in Cortina d'Ampezzo on 21 January 2011 | | | |
| 1326 | 9 | 18 December 2010 | (France) Val-d'Isère | DH _{339} | (United States) Lindsey Vonn | (Switzerland) Nadja Kamer | (Switzerland) Lara Gut | |
| 1327 | 10 | 19 December 2010 | (France) Val-d'Isère | SC _{087} | (United States) Lindsey Vonn | (Austria) Elisabeth Görgl | (Austria) Nicole Hosp | |
| 1328 | 11 | 21 December 2010 | (France) Courchevel | SL _{384} | (Austria) Marlies Schild | (Finland) Tanja Poutiainen | (Slovenia) Tina Maze | |
| 1329 | 12 | 28 December 2010 | (Austria) Semmering | GS _{343} | (France) Tessa Worley | (Germany) Maria Riesch | (Germany) Kathrin Hölzl | |
| 1330 | 13 | 29 December 2010 | (Austria) Semmering | SL _{385} | (Austria) Marlies Schild | (Germany) Maria Riesch | (Germany) Christina Geiger | |
| 1331 | 14 | 2 January 2011 | (Germany) Munich | CE _{001} | (Sweden) Maria Pietilä Holmner | (Slovenia) Tina Maze | (Austria) Elisabeth Görgl | |
| 1332 | 15 | 4 January 2011 | (Croatia) Zagreb | SL _{386} | (Austria) Marlies Schild | (Germany) Maria Riesch | (Italy) Manuela Mölgg | |
| 1333 | 16 | 8 January 2011 | (Austria) Zauchensee | DH _{340} | (United States) Lindsey Vonn | (Sweden) Anja Pärson | (Austria) Anna Fenninger | |
| 1334 | 17 | 9 January 2011 | (Austria) Zauchensee | SG _{173} | (Switzerland) Lara Gut | (United States) Lindsey Vonn | (Switzerland) Dominique Gisin | |
| 1335 | 18 | 11 January 2011 | (Austria) Flachau | SL _{387} | (Germany) Maria Riesch (Finland) Tanja Poutiainen | | (France) Nastasia Noens | |
| | | 15 January 2011 | (Slovenia) Maribor | GS _{cnx} | cancelled during 1st run, warm weather | | | |
| | | 16 January 2011 | (Slovenia) Maribor | SL _{cnx} | warm weather | | | |
| 1336 | 19 | (Note: Super giant slalom from St. Moritz and moved to Val-d'Isère was rescheduled in Cortina on 21 January 2011)21 January 2011 | (Italy) Cortina | SG _{174} | (United States) Lindsey Vonn | (Sweden) Anja Pärson | (Austria) Anna Fenninger | |
| 1337 | 20 | 22 January 2011 | (Italy) Cortina | DH _{341} | (Germany) Maria Riesch | (United States) Julia Mancuso | (United States) Lindsey Vonn | |
| 1338 | 21 | 23 January 2011 | (Italy) Cortina | SG _{175} | (United States) Lindsey Vonn | (Germany) Maria Riesch | (Switzerland) Lara Gut | |
| | | 29 January 2011 | (Italy) Sestriere | DH _{cnx} | fog; replaced in Sestriere on 30 January 2011 | | | |
| | | (Note: Downhill from Sestriere rescheduled from 29 to 30 January 2011 was finally canceled)30 January 2011 | (Italy) Sestriere | DH _{cnx} | heavy snow | | | |
| | | 30 January 2011 | (Italy) Sestriere | SC _{cnx} | originally scheduled; moved to Sestriere on 31 January 2011 | | | |
| | | (Note: Super combined from Sestriere moved from 30 to 31 January 2011 was rescheduled to Tarvisio on 4 March 2011)31 January 2011 | (Italy) Sestriere | SC _{cnx} | heavy snow; replaced in Tarvisio on 4 March 2011 | | | |
| 1339 | 22 | 4 February 2011 | (Germany) Arber-Zwiesel | SL _{388} | (Austria) Marlies Schild | (Slovakia) Veronika Zuzulová | (Finland) Tanja Poutiainen | |
| | | 5 February 2011 | (Germany) Arber-Zwiesel | GS _{cnx} | strong winds and bad visibility; replaced in Arber-Zwiesel on 6 February 2011 | | | |
| 1340 | 23 | (Note: Giant slalom from Arber-Zwiesel rescheduled from 5 to 6 February 2011)6 February 2011 | (Germany) Arber-Zwiesel | GS _{344} | (Germany) Viktoria Rebensburg | (Italy) Federica Brignone | (Austria) Kathrin Zettel | |
2011 World Championships (8–20 February)
| 1341 | 24 | 25 February 2011 | (Sweden) Åre | SC _{088} | (Germany) Maria Riesch | (Slovenia) Tina Maze | (Austria) Elisabeth Görgl | |
| 1342 | 25 | 26 February 2011 | (Sweden) Åre | DH _{342} | (United States) Lindsey Vonn | (Slovenia) Tina Maze | (Germany) Maria Riesch | |
| 1343 | 26 | 27 February 2011 | (Sweden) Åre | SG _{176} | (Germany) Maria Riesch | (United States) Lindsey Vonn | (United States) Julia Mancuso | |
| 1344 | 27 | (Note: Super combined from Sestriere moved from 30 to 31 January 2011 was rescheduled to Tarvisio on 4 March 2011)4 March 2011 | (Italy) Tarvisio | SC _{089} | (Slovenia) Tina Maze | (United States) Lindsey Vonn | (Germany) Maria Riesch | |
| 1345 | 28 | 5 March 2011 | (Italy) Tarvisio | DH _{343} | (Sweden) Anja Pärson | (United States) Lindsey Vonn | (Austria) Elisabeth Görgl | |
| 1346 | 29 | 6 March 2011 | (Italy) Tarvisio | SG _{177} | (United States) Lindsey Vonn | (United States) Julia Mancuso | (Germany) Maria Riesch | |
| 1347 | 30 | 11 March 2011 | (Czech Republic) Špindlerův Mlýn | GS _{345} | (Germany) Viktoria Rebensburg | (Italy) Denise Karbon | (United States) Lindsey Vonn | |
| 1348 | 31 | 12 March 2011 | (Czech Republic) Špindlerův Mlýn | SL _{389} | (Austria) Marlies Schild | (Austria) Kathrin Zettel | (Slovenia) Tina Maze | |
| 1349 | 32 | 16 March 2011 | (Switzerland) Lenzerheide | DH _{344} | (United States) Julia Mancuso | (Switzerland) Lara Gut | (Austria) Elisabeth Görgl | |
| | | 17 March 2011 | (Switzerland) Lenzerheide | SG _{cnx} | rain | | | |
| 1350 | 33 | 18 March 2011 | (Switzerland) Lenzerheide | SL _{390} | (Slovenia) Tina Maze | (Austria) Marlies Schild | (Slovakia) Veronika Zuzulová | |
| | | 19 March 2011 | (Switzerland) Lenzerheide | GS _{cnx} | poor conditions | | | |

=== Nation team event ===
Event key: PG – Parallel giant slalom
| Race | Season | Date | Place | Type | Winner | Second | Third | Details |
|---|---|---|---|---|---|---|---|---|
| 5 | 1 | 20 March 2011 | (Switzerland) Lenzerheide | PG _{002} | Germany Viktoria Rebensburg; Maria Riesch; Susanne Riesch; Fritz Dopfer; Stephan Keppler; Felix Neureuther | Italy Federica Brignone; Giulia Gianesini; Denise Karbon; Cristian Deville; Manfred Mölgg; Giuliano Razzoli | Austria Anna Fenninger; Elisabeth Görgl; Michaela Kirchgasser; Romed Baumann; Hannes Reichelt; Philipp Schörghofer | |

== Men's standings ==
=== Overall ===
| Rank | after all 36 races | Points |
|---|---|---|
| 1 | (Croatia) Ivica Kostelić | 1356 |
| 2 | (Switzerland) Didier Cuche | 956 |
| 3 | (Switzerland) Carlo Janka | 793 |
| 4 | (Norway) Aksel Lund Svindal | 789 |
| 5 | (Austria) Michael Walchhofer | 727 |

=== Downhill ===
| Rank | after all 9 races | Points |
|---|---|---|
| 1 | (Switzerland) Didier Cuche | 510 |
| 2 | (Austria) Michael Walchhofer | 498 |
| 3 | (Austria) Klaus Kröll | 411 |
| 4 | (Switzerland) Silvan Zurbriggen | 305 |
| 5 | (Austria) Romed Baumann | 269 |

=== Super-G ===
| Rank | after all 6 races | Points |
|---|---|---|
| 1 | (Switzerland) Didier Cuche | 291 |
| 2 | (Austria) Georg Streitberger | 227 |
| 3 | (Croatia) Ivica Kostelić | 223 |
| 4 | (Austria) Michael Walchhofer | 214 |
| 5 | (Austria) Hannes Reichelt | 207 |

=== Giant slalom ===
| Rank | after all 6 races | Points |
|---|---|---|
| 1 | (United States) Ted Ligety | 383 |
| 2 | (Norway) Aksel Lund Svindal | 306 |
| 3 | (France) Cyprien Richard | 303 |
| 4 | (Norway) Kjetil Jansrud | 240 |
| 5 | (Switzerland) Carlo Janka | 235 |

=== Slalom ===
| Rank | after all 10 races | Points |
|---|---|---|
| 1 | (Croatia) Ivica Kostelić | 478 |
| 2 | (France) Jean-Baptiste Grange | 442 |
| 3 | (Sweden) André Myhrer | 423 |
| 4 | (Austria) Mario Matt | 407 |
| 5 | (Austria) Marcel Hirscher | 326 |

=== Super combined ===
| Rank | after all 4 races | Points |
|---|---|---|
| 1 | (Croatia) Ivica Kostelić | 345 |
| 2 | (Italy) Christof Innerhofer | 219 |
| 3 | (Norway) Kjetil Jansrud | 145 |
| 4 | (Switzerland) Silvan Zurbriggen | 143 |
| 5 | (Norway) Aksel Lund Svindal | 120 |

== Women's standings ==
=== Overall ===
| Rank | after all 33 races | Points |
|---|---|---|
| 1 | (Germany) Maria Riesch | 1728 |
| 2 | (United States) Lindsey Vonn | 1725 |
| 3 | (Slovenia) Tina Maze | 1139 |
| 4 | (Austria) Elisabeth Görgl | 992 |
| 5 | (United States) Julia Mancuso | 976 |

=== Downhill ===
| Rank | after all 8 races | Points |
|---|---|---|
| 1 | (United States) Lindsey Vonn | 650 |
| 2 | (Germany) Maria Riesch | 457 |
| 3 | (United States) Julia Mancuso | 367 |
| 4 | (Austria) Elisabeth Görgl | 333 |
| 5 | (Sweden) Anja Pärson | 295 |

=== Super-G ===
| Rank | after all 6 races | Points |
|---|---|---|
| 1 | (United States) Lindsey Vonn | 560 |
| 2 | (Germany) Maria Riesch | 389 |
| 3 | (United States) Julia Mancuso | 315 |
| 4 | (Switzerland) Lara Gut | 272 |
| 5 | (Sweden) Anja Pärson | 182 |

=== Giant slalom ===
| Rank | after all 6 races | Points |
|---|---|---|
| 1 | (Germany) Viktoria Rebensburg | 435 |
| 2 | (France) Tessa Worley | 358 |
| 3 | (Finland) Tanja Poutiainen | 240 |
| 4 | (Austria) Elisabeth Görgl | 236 |
| 5 | (Italy) Federica Brignone | 212 |

=== Slalom ===
| Rank | after all 9 races | Points |
|---|---|---|
| 1 | (Austria) Marlies Schild | 680 |
| 2 | (Finland) Tanja Poutiainen | 511 |
| 3 | (Germany) Maria Riesch | 470 |
| 4 | (Sweden) Maria Pietilä Holmner | 382 |
| 5 | (Slovakia) Veronika Zuzulová | 362 |

=== Super combined ===
| Rank | after all 3 races | Points |
|---|---|---|
| 1 | (United States) Lindsey Vonn | 220 |
| 2 | (Slovenia) Tina Maze | 212 |
| 3 | (Germany) Maria Riesch | 205 |
| 4 | (Austria) Elisabeth Görgl | 185 |
| 5 | (Austria) Nicole Hosp | 112 |

== Nations Cup ==
=== Overall ===
| Rank | after all 69 races | Points |
|---|---|---|
| 1 | Austria | 10404 |
| 2 | Switzerland | 6376 |
| 3 | Italy | 5168 |
| 4 | France | 4999 |
| 5 | United States | 4931 |

=== Men ===
| Rank | after all 36 races | Points |
|---|---|---|
| 1 | Austria | 5684 |
| 2 | Switzerland | 4164 |
| 3 | Italy | 3036 |
| 4 | France | 3006 |
| 5 | Sweden | 1648 |

=== Women ===
| Rank | after all 33 races | Points |
|---|---|---|
| 1 | Austria | 4720 |
| 2 | Germany | 3480 |
| 3 | United States | 3436 |
| 4 | Switzerland | 2212 |
| 5 | Italy | 2132 |
