= Axel Bäck =

Swedish alpine skier (born 1987)

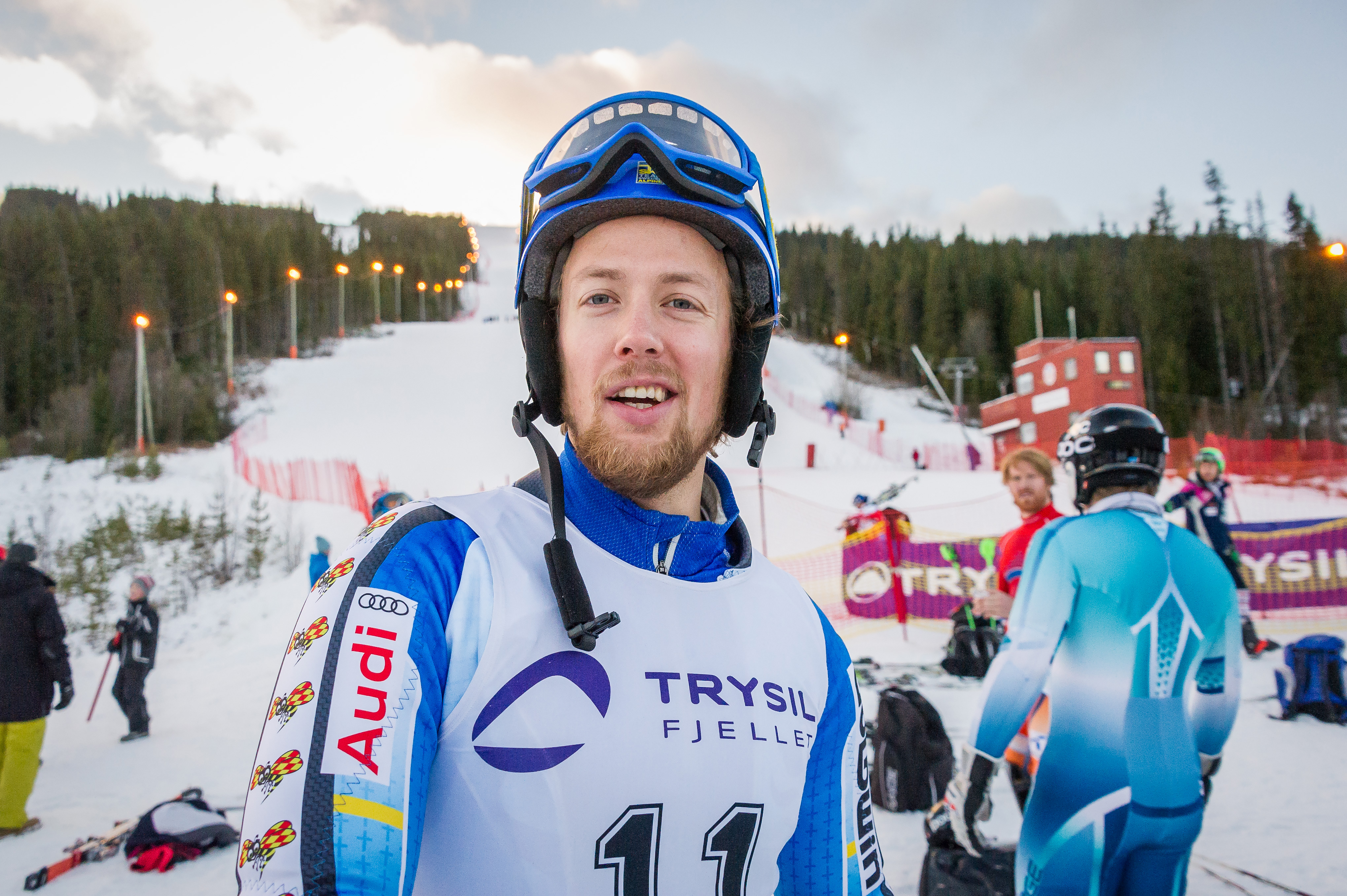

Medal record

Men's alpine skiing

Representing Sweden

World Championships
Bronze medal – third place	2011 Garmisch-Partenkirchen	Team event

Axel Erik Bäck (born 23 December 1987) is an alpine skier from Sweden. Born in Saltsjöbaden, he competed for Sweden at the 2010 Winter Olympics where he was disqualified from the second run in the slalom.

On 7 April 2016 his retirement from alpine skiing was announced.

== World Cup results ==
=== Season standings ===
Season	Age	Overall	Slalom	Giant slalom	Super-G	Downhill	Combined
2010	-	64	19	—	—	—	—
2011	-	40	14	—	—	—	—
2012	-	63	24	—	—	—	—
2013	-	81	29	—	—	—	—
2014	-	52	15	—	—	—	—
2015	-	52	17	—	—	—	—
