= FIS Alpine World Ski Championships 2011 =

Skiing event in Garmisch-Partenkirchen, Germany

41st FIS Alpine World Ski Championships
- Host city: Garmisch-Partenkirchen, Bavaria, Germany
- Nations: 69
- Athletes: 525
- Events: 11
- Opening: 7 February 2011
- Closing: 20 February 2011
- Opened by: Horst Köhler
- Main venue: Garmisch Classic; Gudiberg (slalom)
- Website: gap2011.com

Location in southern Germany
Location in the Alps of Europe

The FIS Alpine World Ski Championships 2011 were the 41st FIS Alpine World Ski Championships, held 7–20 February in Germany at Garmisch-Partenkirchen, Bavaria.

These were the second alpine world championships in Garmisch-Partenkirchen, which previously hosted in 1978. It also hosted the first Olympic alpine skiing competition, a combined event at the 1936 Winter Olympics.

The FIS awarded the championships on 25 May 2006, in Vilamoura, Portugal. The runner-up was Schladming, Austria, which hosted the next championships in 2013. Prior to landing the 2011 event in 2006, Garmisch-Partenkirchen had unsuccessfully bid to host the world championships five times in the previous two decades.

Most of the competitions took place on the Kandahar slopes of Garmisch Classic, one of the two skiing areas of Garmisch-Partenkirchen. The slalom course was at Gudiberg, adjacent to the Große Olympiaschanze, the ski jumping hill. Unseasonal spring-like conditions prevailed during the two weeks of competition.

== Course information ==
Course information (metric)
Day	Date	Time	Race	Start elevation	Finish elevation	Vertical drop	Course length	Gates	Average gradient	Course name	Sky	Start temp.	Finish temp.
Tue	08 Feb	11:00	Super-G – women	1305 m	770 m	535 m	2.180 km	45	25.3%	Kandahar 1	sunny	+ 2 C	+ 8 C
Wed	09 Feb	11:00	Super-G – men	1395	770	625	2.200	48	29.6	Kandahar 2	sunny	3	+ 8
Fri	11 Feb	10:00	Downhill (SC) – women	1535	770	765	2.920	43	27.2	Kandahar 1	cloudy	+ 3	+ 7
Fri	11 Feb	14:00	Slalom (SC) – women	935	750	185		62		Gudiberg	cloudy	+ 7	+ 12
Sat	12 Feb	11:00	Downhill – men	1690	770	920	3.300	44	29.0	Kandahar 2	sunny	+ 3	+ 9
Sun	13 Feb	11:00	Downhill – women	1490	770	720	2.920	43	25.4	Kandahar 1	p.cldy	+ 3	+ 6
Mon	14 Feb	10:00	Downhill (SC) – men	1690	770	920	3.300	44	29.0	Kandahar 2	sunny	+ 1	+ 4
Mon	14 Feb	14:00	Slalom (SC) – men	960	750	210		62		Gudiberg	sunny	+ 12	+ 12
Thu	17 Feb	12:00; 15:00	Giant slalom – women	1100	750	350		51; 51		Kandahar 1	foggy foggy	+ 1 + 3	+ 3 + 5
Fri	18 Feb	10:00; 13:30	Giant slalom – men	1090	750	340		41; 47		Kandahar 2	foggy foggy	0 + 1	+ 3 + 4
Sat	19 Feb	10:00; 13:30	Slalom – women	960	750	210		63; 64		Gudiberg	cloudy sunny	1; + 6	+ 1 + 7
Sun	20 Feb	10:00; 13:30	Slalom – men	960	750	210		65; 64		Gudiberg	foggy foggy	0: 1	+ 1 + 2

== Medal winners ==
=== Men's events ===
Event	Gold		Silver		Bronze	
Downhill	Erik Guay; Canada	1:58.41	Didier Cuche; Switzerland	1:58.73	Christof Innerhofer; Italy	1:59.17
Super-G	Christof Innerhofer; Italy	1:38.31	Hannes Reichelt; Austria	1:38.91	Ivica Kostelić; Croatia	1:39.03
Giant slalom	Ted Ligety; United States	2:10.56	Cyprien Richard; France	2:10.64	Philipp Schörghofer; Austria	2:10.99
Slalom	Jean-Baptiste Grange; France	1:41.72	Jens Byggmark; Sweden	1:42.15	Manfred Mölgg; Italy	1:42.33
Super combined	Aksel Lund Svindal; Norway (NOR)	2:54.51	Christof Innerhofer; Italy	2:55.52	Peter Fill; Italy	2:56.41

=== Women's events ===
Event	Gold		Silver		Bronze	
Downhill	Elisabeth Görgl; Austria	1:47.24	Lindsey Vonn; United States	1:47.68	Maria Riesch; Germany	1:47.84
Super-G	Elisabeth Görgl; Austria	1:23.82	Julia Mancuso; United States	1:23.87	Maria Riesch; Germany	1:24.03
Giant slalom	Tina Maze; Slovenia	2:20.54	Federica Brignone; Italy	2:20.63	Tessa Worley; France	2:21.02
Slalom	Marlies Schild; Austria	1:45.79	Kathrin Zettel; Austria	1:46.13	Maria Pietilä Holmner; Sweden	1:46.44
Super combined	Anna Fenninger; Austria	2:43.23	Tina Maze; Slovenia	2:43.32	Anja Pärson; Sweden	2:43.50

=== Team event ===
Event	Gold	Silver	Bronze
Team event	France; Taïna Barioz; Anémone Marmottan; Tessa Worley; Gauthier de Tessières; Thomas Fanara; Cyprien Richard	Austria; Anna Fenninger; Michaela Kirchgasser; Marlies Schild; Romed Baumann; Benjamin Raich; Philipp Schörghofer	Sweden; Sara Hector; Anja Pärson; Maria Pietilä Holmner; Axel Bäck; Hans Olsson; Matts Olsson

== Medal table ==
* Host nation (Germany)

Rank	Nation	Gold	Silver	Bronze	Total
1	Austria (AUT)	4	3	1	8
2	France (FRA)	2	1	1	4
3	Italy (ITA)	1	2	3	6
4	United States (USA)	1	2	0	3
5	Slovenia (SLO)	1	1	0	2
6	Canada (CAN)	1	0	0	1
6	Norway (NOR)	1	0	0	1
8	Sweden (SWE)	0	1	3	4
9	Switzerland (SUI)	0	1	0	1
10	Germany (GER)*	0	0	2	2
11	Croatia (CRO)	0	0	1	1
Totals (11 entries)		11	11	11	33

== Participating nations ==
525 athletes from 69 countries will compete. Haiti will make its debut.

- Andorra
- Argentina
- Armenia
- Australia
- Austria
- Azerbaijan
- Belarus
- Belgium
- Bosnia and Herzegovina
- Brazil
- Bulgaria
- Canada
- Chile
- China
- Croatia
- Cyprus
- Czech Republic
- Denmark
- Finland
- France
- Georgia
- Germany
- Ghana
- Great Britain
- Greece
- Haiti
- Hungary
- Japan
- Iceland
- India
- Iran
- Ireland
- Israel
- Italy
- Kazakhstan
- Kyrgyzstan
- Latvia
- Lebanon
- Liechtenstein
- Lithuania
- Luxembourg
- Macedonia
- Mexico
- Moldova
- Monaco
- Montenegro
- Netherlands
- New Zealand
- Norway
- Peru
- Poland
- Portugal
- Puerto Rico
- Romania
- Russia
- Serbia
- Slovakia
- Slovenia
- South Africa
- South Korea
- Spain
- Sweden
- Switzerland
- Turkey
- Ukraine
- United States
- Uzbekistan

== See also ==
- 2011 IPC Alpine Skiing World Championships
