= Johannes Strolz =

Austrian alpine skier

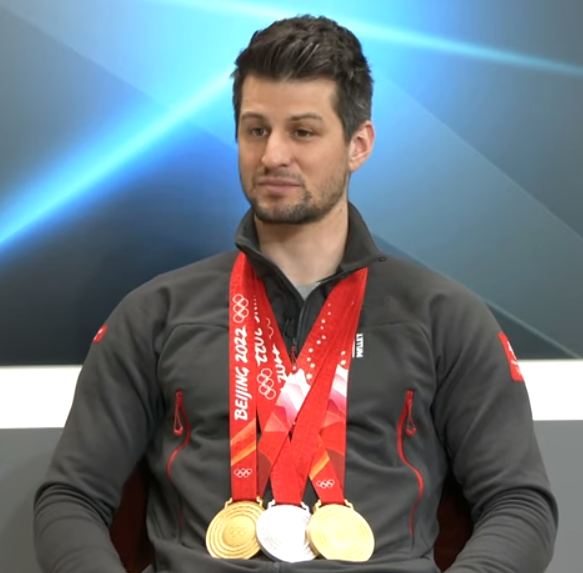
- Triple medalist at the 2022 Winter Olympics

Personal information
- Born: 12 September 1992 (age 33) Bludenz, Vorarlberg, Austria
- Height: 1.86 m (6 ft 1 in)
- Parent: Hubert Strolz (father)
- Website: johannesstrolz.at

Skiing career
- Country: Austria
- Sport: Alpine skiing
- Club: SC Warth - Vorarlberg
- Disciplines: Slalom, giant slalom
- World Cup debut: 14 December 2013 (age 21)

Olympics
- Teams: 1 – (2022)
- Medals: 3 (2 gold)

World Championships
- Teams: 1 – (2023)
- Medals: 0

World Cup
- Seasons: 13 – (2014–2026)
- Wins: 1 – (1 SL)
- Podiums: 1 – (1 SL)
- Overall titles: 0 – (34th in 2022)
- Discipline titles: 0 – (11th in SL, 2022)
Medal record
Men's alpine skiing
Representing Austria
Olympic Games
Gold medal – first place	2022 Beijing	Team event
Gold medal – first place	2022 Beijing	Combined
Silver medal – second place	2022 Beijing	Slalom
Junior World Championships
Bronze medal – third place	2012 Roccaraso	Super-G

Johannes Strolz (born 12 September 1992) is an Austrian World Cup alpine ski racer. He won the gold medal in the combined at the 2022 Olympics. He specializes in the technical events of slalom and giant slalom. He is the son of Hubert Strolz, the gold medalist in Combined at the 1988 Winter Olympics in Calgary. He and his father became the first father-son duo to win gold in Alpine skiing at the Olympics.

== Biography ==
=== Youth and Europa Cup ===
Strolz was born on 12 September 1992 in Bludenz, Austria. His father, Hubert Strolz, became the Olympic champion in combined at the 1988 Winter Olympics in Calgary. After graduating from the famous Schigymnasium Stams, he became a member of the junior squad of the Austrian Skiing Federation. Making his debut in the FIS Alpine Ski Europa Cup, Strolz's first success came at the World Junior Alpine Skiing Championships 2012, where he won the bronze medal in the Super-G, behind Switzerland's Ralph Weber and Nils Mani. At the following championships in Québec, he failed to repeat the win of a medal, still finishing within the top 20. Strolz then began shifting his focus onto the technical competitions of slalom and giant slalom. He became the overall champion of the Europa Cup in the 2017–18 season.

=== World Cup and Olympic Games ===
Johannes Strolz debuted on the FIS Alpine Ski World Cup at the giant slalom of Val-d’Isère in December 2013. He then struggled to deliver results and only appeared occasionally on the World Cup. In December 2019, he achieved his first world cup points, finishing 30th at Garmisch-Partenkirchen. At the slalom of Madonna di Campiglio in January 2020, Strolz reached his best result at that point, tenth place. He failed to win further points at the World Cup and was dismissed from the squad for that reason. He was granted to train with the Austrian team sometimes. Strolz had to pay for everything himself, including preparing his skis. Two years after his top-ten finish, he unexpectedly won the slalom race of Adelboden on 9 January 2022.

At the 2022 Winter Olympics in China, Strolz took part in the combined, slalom, and team events. He won medals in all three events, two gold and one silver. Thirty-four years after his father became an Olympic champion in Calgary, Strolz won the combined event, becoming the first father-son duo to win gold in alpine skiing at the Olympics. He then claimed the silver medal in the slalom, runner-up to Clement Noel of France, and the gold medal in the team event.

== World Cup results ==
=== Season standings ===
Season
Season	Age	Overall	Slalom	Giant slalom	Super-G	Downhill	Combined	Parallel
2018	25	141	—	53	—	—	—	—N/a
2019	26	68	37	34	—	—	20	—N/a
2020	27	120	46	—	—	—	—	—
2021	28	100	35	—	—	—	—N/a	—
2022	29	34	11	—	—	—	—N/a	—
2023	30	97	32	—	—	—	—N/a	—N/a
2024	31	47	13	—	—	—	—N/a	—N/a
2025	32	65	24	—	—	—	—N/a	—N/a
2026	33	88	33	—	—	—	—N/a	—N/a

=== Top-ten finishes ===
- 1 win (1 SL)
- 1 podium; 7 top tens (7 SL)

Season
Season	Date	Location	Discipline	Place
2020	8 January 2020	Madonna di Campiglio, Italy	Slalom	10th
2022	9 January 2022	Adelboden, Switzerland	Slalom	1st
2022	22 January 2022	Kitzbühel, Austria	Slalom	5th
2022	26 February 2022	Garmisch-Partenkirchen, Germany	Slalom	4th
2022	9 March 2022	Flachau, Austria	Slalom	4th
2024	3 March 2024	Aspen, United States	Slalom	4th
2024	17 March 2024	Saalbach, Austria	Slalom	10th

== World Championship results ==
Year
Year	Age	Slalom	Giant slalom	Super G	Downhill	Combined
2023	30	—	—	—	—	DNF2

== Olympic results ==
Year
Year	Age	Slalom	Giant slalom	Super G	Downhill	Combined	Team event
2022	29	2	—	—	–	1	1

== See also ==
- List of Olympic medalist families
