= Miha Hrobat =

Slovenian alpine skier (born 1995)

Personal information
- Born: 3 February 1995 (age 31) Kranj, Slovenia
- Height: 1.74 m (5 ft 9 in)

Skiing career
- Country: Slovenia
- Sport: Alpine skiing ♂
- Club: TRG – ASK Triglav Kranj
- Disciplines: Downhill; super-G; combined
- World Cup debut: 19 March 2015 (age 20)

Olympics
- Teams: 3 – (2018, 2022, 2026)
- Medals: 0

World Championships
- Teams: 5 – (2017–2025)
- Medals: 0

World Cup
- Seasons: 11 – (2016–2026)
- Wins: 0
- Podiums: 3 – (2 DH, 1 SG)
- Overall titles: 0 – (15th in 2025)
- Discipline titles: 0 – (4th in DH, 2025)

Miha Hrobat (born 3 February 1995) is a Slovenian alpine ski racer. He earned his first World Cup podium in December 2024 in a downhill at Beaver Creek, Colorado, US.

== Personal life ==
Hrobat was born in Kranj, Slovenia, on 3 February 1995. He measures 174 cm tall.

== World Cup results ==
His World Cup debut was on 19 March 2015, at Meribel, France.

=== Season standings ===
Season
Season	Age	Overall	Slalom	Giant slalom	Super-G	Downhill	Combined
2018	23	154	—	—	—	—	38
2019	24	111	—	—	43	—	33
2020	25	109	—	—	30	—	33
2021	26	107	—	—	37	—	—N/a
2022	27	99	—	—	—	37	—N/a
2023	28	77	—	—	60	29	—N/a
2024	29	80	—	—	—	22	—N/a
2025	30	15	—	—	18	4	—N/a
2026	31	40	—	—	31	14	—N/a

=== Race podiums ===
- 0 wins
- 3 podiums - (2 DH, 1 SG), 12 top tens (10 DH, 2 SG)

Season
Season	Date	Location	Discipline	Place
2025	6 December 2024	Beaver Creek, United States	Downhill	3rd
2025	18 January 2025	Wengen, Switzerland	Downhill	3rd
2025	9 March 2025	Kvitfjell, Norway	Super-G	3rd

== World Championship results ==
Year
Year	Age	Slalom	Giant slalom	Super-G	Downhill	Combined	Team combined	Parallel	Team event
2017	22	—	DNF1	24	14	—	—N/a	—N/a	—
2019	24	—	DNF1	DNF	27	33	—N/a	—N/a	—
2021	26	—	—	DNF	23	DNF2	—N/a	—	—
2023	28	—	—	28	8	DNF1	—N/a	—	—
2025	30	—	—	DNF	DNF	—N/a	—	—N/a	—

== Olympic results ==
Hrobat competed in the 2012 Winter Youth Olympics, as well as the Winter Olympic Games of 2018, 2022, and 2026.

Year
Year	Age	Slalom	Giant slalom	Super-G	Downhill	Combined	Team combined	Team event
2018	23	—	DNF1	DNF	29	—	—N/a	—
2022	27	—	—	DNF	24	DNF1	—N/a	7
2026	31	—	—	13	12	—N/a	—	—N/a
