= Jared Goldberg =

American alpine skier (born 1991)

Personal information
- Born: June 17, 1991 (age 35) Boston, Massachusetts, U.S.
- Height: 6 ft 0 in (183 cm)

Skiing career
- Country: United States
- Sport: Alpine skiing ♂
- Club: Snowbird Sports Education Foundation
- Disciplines: Downhill, Super-G, Combined
- World Cup debut: November 2012 (age 21)

Olympics
- Teams: 2 – (2014, 2018)
- Medals: 0

World Championships
- Teams: 5 – (2015, 2017, 2021, 2023, 2025)
- Medals: 0

World Cup
- Seasons: 9 – (2014–2022)
- Wins: 0
- Podiums: 1 – (1 SG)
- Overall titles: 0 – (53rd in 2024)
- Discipline titles: 0 – (15th in AC, 2014)

Jared Goldberg (born June 17, 1991) is an American World Cup alpine ski racer, a member of the U.S. Ski Team, and resident of Holladay, Utah.

Goldberg was the 2010 U.S. Junior Championships combined champion, and won the downhill title in the 2013 U.S. Championships. Goldberg competed for the United States in the 2014 Winter Olympics in Sochi, Russia, and the 2018 Winter Olympics in PyeongChang, South Korea.

== Early life ==
Goldberg was born in Boston, Massachusetts, to Don (the owner of a computer consultants temporary staffing company) and Annette Goldberg (a nurse). His parents, both part-time ski instructors, met for the first time at Killington Ski Resort in Vermont. His family moved to Utah when he was four years old, and he was raised in the Sugar House neighborhood of Salt Lake City. He is Jewish and had his Bar Mitzvah celebration in a ski lodge.

Goldberg attended Skyline High School in Salt Lake City, where he played the midfield position in lacrosse and was also on the golf team. He attends Westminster College, where he studies mechanical engineering. His teammates call him “Goldie.”

== Skiing career ==
Goldberg's club is Snowbird Sports Education Foundation. He first started competing in both skiing and snowboarding.

Goldberg was the 2010 U.S. Junior Championships combined champion, and took second in Junior downhill and third in junior giant slalom (GS) in the 2011 U.S. Junior Championships. He took third in Super-G (SG) at the 2012 U.S. Championships.

Goldberg won the downhill title in the 2013 U.S. Championships in Copper Mountain, Colorado, where he also took second in SG. He took third in GS at the 2014 U.S. Championships.

In 2013, Goldberg was the overall Nor-Am Champion, competing in three different circuits that season; Nor-Am Cup, Europa Cup, and World Cup.

Goldberg represented the United States at the 2014 Winter Olympics and competed in Sochi, Russia, finishing 11th in the combined and 19th in the giant slalom. At 22 years of age, he was the youngest member of the 2014 US Men's Alpine Team.

In the 2015 World Championships, Goldberg had the third-fastest downhill run, AC, in Vail/Beaver Creek. In 2016, skiing at Snowbird in Utah, his left ski hit a hidden tree trunk and he snapped his Achilles tendon.

In 2017, he competed in the World Championships in St. Moritz, Switzerland, in February, and took second place in SG at the U.S. Alpine Championships in March. In December, he gained his first World Cup top ten finish with ninth place in the downhill at Val Gardena, Italy.

At the 2018 Winter Olympics in PyeongChang, South Korea, Goldberg was 20th in the downhill, 24th in the super-G, and 36th at the combined.

== World Cup results ==
=== Season standings ===
Season	Age	Overall	Slalom	Giant slalom	Super-G	Downhill	Combined
2013	21	144	—	—	52	—	—
2014	22	81	—	—	—	39	15
2015	23	72	—	—	41	36	16
2016	24	93	—	—	44	44	21
2017	25	98	—	—	56	31	—
2018	26	63	—	—	39	26	19
2019	27	103	—	—	60	36	37
2020	28	92	—	—	—	32	37
2021	29	68	—	—	47	23	—N/a
2022	30	85	—	—	51	31	—N/a
2023	31	57	—	—	44	22	—N/a
2024	32	53	—	—	23	27	—N/a
2025	33	26	—	—	4	—	—N/a

Standings through 20 December 2024

=== Top ten finishes ===
- 0 wins
- 1 podium (1 SG); 7 top tens (5 DH, 2 SG)

Season	Date	Location	Discipline	Place
2018	16 Dec 2017	Val Gardena, Italy	Downhill	9th
2019	2 Mar 2019	Kvitfjell, Norway	Downhill	9th
2021	19 Dec 2020	Val Gardena, Italy	Downhill	9th
2023	17 Dec 2022	Val Gardena, Italy	Downhill	9th
2023	20 Jan 2023	Kitzbühel, Austria	Downhill	4th
2024	16 Dec 2023	Val Gardena, Italy	Super-G	10th
2025	20 Dec 2024	Val Gardena, Italy	Super-G	2nd

== World Championship results ==
Year	Age	Slalom	Giant slalom	Super-G	Downhill	Combined	Team Combined
2015	23	—	—	—	20	29	—N/a
2017	25	—	—	—	20	21	—N/a
2021	29	—	—	15	20	DNS2	—N/a
2023	31	—	—	—	26	—	—N/a
2025	33	—	—	25	24	—N/a	—

== Olympic results ==
Year	Age	Slalom	Giant slalom	Super-G	Downhill	Combined
2014	22	—	19	—	—	11
2018	26	—	—	24	20	36

== See also ==
- List of select Jewish skiers
