= Stefan Rogentin =

Swiss alpine skier (born 1994)

Personal information
- Born: 16 May 1994 (age 32) Lenzerheide, Graubünden, Switzerland
- Height: 1.84 m (6 ft 0 in)

Skiing career
- Country: Switzerland
- Sport: Alpine skiing ♂
- Club: Lenzerheide-Valbella
- Disciplines: Super-G, Downhill
- World Cup debut: 4 December 2016 (age 22)

Olympics
- Teams: 2 – (2022, 2026)
- Medals: 0

World Championships
- Teams: 2 – (2023, 2025)
- Medals: 1 (0 gold)

World Cup
- Seasons: 10 – (2017–2026)
- Wins: 1 – (1 SG)
- Podiums: 7 – (4 SG, 3 DH)
- Overall titles: 0 – (10th in 2025)
- Discipline titles: 0 – (2nd in SG, 2025)
Medal record
Men's alpine skiing
Representing Switzerland
World Championships
Bronze medal – third place	2025 Saalbach	Team combined

Stefan Rogentin (born 16 May 1994) is a Swiss World Cup alpine ski racer who represented Switzerland at the 2022 Winter Olympics in the downhill and super-G, and at the 2026 Winter Olympics in the downhill, super-G, and team combined

== World Cup results ==
=== Season standings ===
Season
Season	Age	Overall	Slalom	Giant slalom	Super-G	Downhill	Combined	Parallel
2018	23	148	—	—	—	—	34	—N/a
2019	24	107	—	—	45	—	23	—N/a
2020	25	88	—	—	27	—	22	—
2021	26	82	—	—	34	33	—N/a	—
2022	27	29	—	—	7	25	—N/a	—
2023	28	22	—	—	6	19	—N/a	—N/a
2024	29	18	—	—	4	16	—N/a	—N/a
2025	30	10	—	—	2	8	—N/a	—N/a
2026	31	15	—	—	8	10	—N/a	—N/a

=== Race podiums ===
- 1 win – (1 SG)
- 7 podiums – (4 SG, 3 DH), 32 top tens (22 SG, 10 DH)

Season
Season	Date	Location	Discipline	Place
2023	13 January 2023	Wengen, Switzerland	Super-G	2nd
2024	22 March 2024	Saalbach, Austria	Super-G	1st
2025	17 January 2025	Wengen, Switzerland	Super-G	3rd
2025	24 January 2025	Kitzbühel, Austria	Super-G	3rd
2025	7 March 2025	Kvitfjell, Norway	Downhill	3rd
2025	8 March 2025	Kvitfjell, Norway	Downhill	3rd
2026	28 February 2026	Garmisch, Germany	Downhill	3rd

== World Championships results ==
Year
Year	Age	Slalom	Giant slalom	Super-G	Downhill	Combined	Team combined	Team event
2023	28	—	—	19	—	DNS2	—N/a	—
2025	30	—	—	12	9	—N/a	3	—

== Olympic results ==
Year
Year	Age	Slalom	Giant slalom	Super-G	Downhill	Combined	Team combined	Team event
2022	27	—	—	14	25	—	—N/a	—
2026	31	—	—	9	23	—N/a	18	—N/a
