= James Crawford (alpine skier) =

Canadian alpine skier (born 1997)

Personal information
- Born: James Alexander Crawford; 3 May 1997 (age 29) Toronto, Ontario, Canada
- Height: 1.75 m (5 ft 9 in)
- Family: Candace Crawford (sister); Judy Crawford (aunt)

Skiing career
- Country: Canada
- Sport: Alpine skiing
- Club: Georgian Peaks & Whistler Mountain
- Disciplines: Downhill, Super-G, Giant slalom, Combined
- World Cup debut: 22 January 2016 (age 18)

Olympics
- Teams: 3 – (2018, 2022, 2026)
- Medals: 1 (0 gold)

World Championships
- Teams: 4 – (2019–2025)
- Medals: 1 (1 gold)

World Cup
- Seasons: 10 – (2016, 2018–2026)
- Wins: 1 – (1 DH)
- Podiums: 6 – (4 DH, 2 SG)
- Overall titles: 0 – (12th in 2023)
- Discipline titles: 0 – (5th in SG, 2022; DH, 2023, 2025}
Medal record
Men's alpine skiing
Representing Canada
International competitions
Event	1st	2nd	3rd
Olympic Games	0	0	1
World Championships	1	0	0
Total	1	0	1
Olympic Games
Bronze medal – third place	2022 Beijing	Combined
World Championships
Gold medal – first place	2023 Courchevel	Super-G
Junior World Championships
Gold medal – first place	2017 Åre	Team event
Silver medal – second place	2016 Sochi	Super-G

James Alexander "Jack" Crawford (born 3 May 1997) is a Canadian World Cup alpine ski racer. He specializes in the speed disciplines of downhill and super-G, and occasionally competes in giant slalom and combined.

Crawford made his World Cup debut in January 2016 in a super-G at Kitzbühel, Austria. He represented Canada at the 2018 Winter Olympics, and the World Championships in 2019 and 2021, where he was fourth in the combined event. In January 2022, Crawford was named to Canada's Olympic team for the second time; finishing fourth in the downhill, sixth in the super-G, and winning the bronze medal in the combined. At the 2023 World Championships in Courchevel, Crawford won his first gold medal in Super-G. In 2025, he won the Kitzbühel downhill, the first Canadian win since Todd Brooker in 1983. In 2026 competed at the Milano Cortina Olympics, finishing ninth in the men's downhill and sixteenth in the super-G.

Crawford's older sister Candace is also an alpine racer; their aunt is Judy Crawford, who finished fourth in the slalom at the 1972 Winter Olympics at Sapporo.

== World Cup results ==
=== Season standings ===
Season
Season	Age	Overall	Slalom	Giant slalom	Super-G	Downhill	Combined	Parallel
2019	21	150	—	—	54	—	—	—N/a
2020	22	97	—	—	22	—	—	—
2021	23	82	—	—	24	51	—N/a	—
2022	24	14	—	—	5	16	—N/a	—
2023	25	12	—	54	19	5	—N/a	—N/a
2024	26	23	—	41	12	13	—N/a	—N/a
2025	27	13	—	—	11	5	—N/a	—N/a
2026	28	67	—	—	22	38	—N/a	—N/a

=== Race podiums ===
- 1 win (1 DH)
- 6 podiums (4 DH, 2 SG); 28 top tens (15 DH, 13 SG)

Season
Season	Date	Location	Discipline	Place
2022	6 March 2022	Kvitfjell, Norway	Super-G	2nd
2023	3 December 2022	Beaver Creek, United States	Downhill	3rd
2023	28 December 2022	Bormio, Italy	Downhill	2nd
2023	4 March 2023	Aspen, United States	Downhill	2nd
2025	25 January 2025	Kitzbühel, Austria	Downhill	1st
2025	9 March 2025	Kvitfjell, Norway	Super-G	2nd

== World Championship results ==
Year
Year	Age	Slalom	Giant slalom	Super-G	Downhill	Combined	Team combined	Parallel	Team event
2019	21	—	—	36	—	—	—N/a	—N/a	—
2021	23	—	DNF1	14	21	4	—N/a	—	—
2023	25	—	—	1	5	DNS SL	—N/a	—	—
2025	27	—	—	27	23	—N/a	—	—N/a	—

== Olympic results ==
Year
Year	Age	Slalom	Giant slalom	Super-G	Downhill	Combined	Team combined	Team event
2018	20	—	29	DNF	—	20	—N/a	—
2022	24	—	—	6	4	3	—N/a	—
2026	28	—	—	16	9	—N/a	—	—N/a
