= Trevor Philp =

Canadian alpine skier (born 1992)

Personal information
- Born: May 1, 1992 (age 34) Toronto, Ontario, Canada
- Height: 181 cm (5 ft 11 in)

Skiing career
- Sport: Alpine skiing
- Club: Banff Alpine Racers
- Disciplines: Slalom, giant slalom, super-G
- World Cup debut: January 8, 2012 (age 19)

Olympics
- Teams: 3 – (2014, 2018, 2022)
- Medals: 0

World Championships
- Teams: 5 – (2013–2021)
- Medals: 1 (team) (0 gold)

World Cup
- Seasons: 11 – (2012–2022)
- Podiums: 0
- Overall titles: 0 – (54th in 2019)
- Discipline titles: 0 – (25th in GS, 2019)
Medal record
Men's alpine skiing
Representing Canada
World Championships
Silver medal – second place	2015 Beaver Creek	Team event

Trevor Philp (born May 1, 1992) is a Canadian World Cup alpine ski racer specializing in the technical events of slalom and giant slalom. Philp has represented Canada at three Winter Olympics and five World Championships; born in Toronto, he resides in Calgary, Alberta.

In January 2022, Philp was named to Canada's 2022 Olympic team.

== World Cup results ==
=== Season standings ===
Season	Age	Overall	Slalom	Giant slalom	Super-G	Downhill	Combined	Parallel
2014	21	140	—	51	—	—	—	—N/a
2015	22	133	—	41	—	—	—	—N/a
2016	23	102	37	45	—	—	37	—N/a
2017	24	no World Cup points						—N/a
2018	25	83	40	34	—	—	—	—N/a
2019	26	54	41	25	—	—	11	—N/a
2020	27	80	58	25	—	—	—	38
2021	28	92	—	30	—	—	—N/a	28
2022	29	53	—	21	35	—	—N/a	5
2023	30	79	—	23	51	—	—N/a	—N/a

Standings through 18 January 2023

=== Top twenty results ===
- 0 podiums
- 4 top tens

Season	Date	Location	Discipline	Place
2015	21 Dec 2014	Alta Badia, Italy	Giant slalom	19th
2016	12 Dec 2015	Val-d'Isère, France	Giant slalom	18th
2016	24 Jan 2016	Kitzbühel, Austria	Slalom	14th
2018	3 Dec 2017	(United States) Beaver Creek, USA	Giant slalom	11th
2018	4 Mar 2018	Kranjska Gora, Slovenia	Slalom	14th
2019	16 Dec 2018	Alta Badia, Italy	Giant slalom	19th
2019	22 Dec 2018	Madonna di Campiglio, Italy	Slalom	12th
2019	22 Feb 2019	Bansko, Bulgaria	Combined	5th
2019	9 Mar 2019	Kranjska Gora, Slovenia	Giant slalom	8th
2020	8 Dec 2019	(United States) Beaver Creek, USA	Giant slalom	7th
2021	5 Dec 2020	Santa Caterina, Italy	Giant slalom	18th
2021	7 Dec 2020	Santa Caterina, Italy	Giant slalom	16th
2021	13 Mar 2021	Kranjska Gora, Slovenia	Giant slalom	19th
2022	14 Nov 2021	Lech/Zürs, Austria	Parallel-G	5th
2022	2 Dec 2021	(United States) Beaver Creek, USA	Super-G	18th
2022	19 Dec 2021	Alta Badia, Italy	Giant slalom	19th
2022	20 Dec 2021	Alta Badia, Italy	Giant slalom	15th
2022	6 Mar 2022	Kvitfjell, Norway	Super-G	17th
2022	12 Mar 2022	Kranjska Gora, Slovenia	Giant slalom	13th
2022	19 Mar 2022	Méribel, France	Giant slalom	15th
2023	23 Oct 2022	Sölden, Austria	Giant slalom	15th
2023	7 Jan 2023	Adelboden, Switzerland	Giant slalom	17th

== World Championship results ==
Year	Age	Slalom	Giant slalom	Super-G	Downhill	Combined	Team event
2013	20	35	—	—	—	—	—
2015	22	18	18	—	—	—	2
2017	24	DNF1	DNF1	—	—	—	5
2019	26	DNF1	18	—	—	—	9
2021	28	—	DNF1	—	—	10	—

== Olympic results ==
Year	Age	Slalom	Giant slalom	Super-G	Downhill	Combined	Team event
2014	21	DNF2	25	—	—	—	—N/a
2018	25	DNF2	18	—	—	—	9
2022	29	DNF1	24	10	—	DNF2	9
