= Adrian Smiseth Sejersted =

Norwegian alpine skier (born 1994)

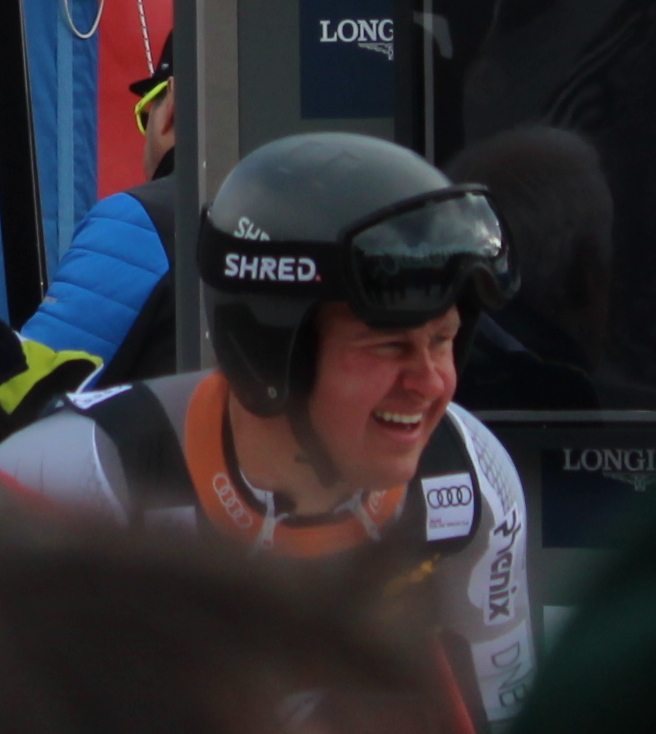
- At Bormio in December 2019

Personal information
- Born: 16 July 1994 (age 32) Hosle, Norway
- Family: Lotte Smiseth Sejersted (sister)

Skiing career
- Country: Norway
- Sport: Alpine skiing
- Club: Stabæk IF
- Disciplines: Super-G, Downhill
- World Cup debut: 12 March 2014 (age 19)

Olympics
- Teams: 2 − (2022, 2026)
- Medals: 0

World Championships
- Teams: 3 − (2019, 2023, 2025)
- Medals: 1 (0 gold)

World Cup
- Seasons: 12 − (2014, 2016–2026)
- Wins: 0
- Podiums: 3 − (2 SG, 1 DH)
- Overall titles: 0 – (27th in 2026)
- Discipline titles: 0 – (9th in SG, 2021)
Medal record
Men's alpine skiing
Representing Norway
World Championships
| Bronze medal – third place | 2025 Saalbach | Super-G |
Junior World Championships
| Gold medal – first place | 2014 Jasná | Downhill |
| Silver medal – second place | 2014 Jasná | Super combined |
| Bronze medal – third place | 2013 Québec | Super-G |

Adrian Smiseth Sejersted (born 16 July 1994) is a Norwegian World Cup alpine ski racer, and specializes in the speed events of downhill and super-G.

At the Junior World Championships, he finished eighth and ninth in 2012, followed by a bronze medal in super-G in 2013. In 2014 he improved further, first to a silver medal in super combined before he won the downhill.

Smiseth Sejersted made his World Cup debut in March 2014 in Lenzerheide, where he also collected his first World Cup points with a 14th-place finish. His first top ten came in December 2016, and first podium in December 2020.

He represents the sports club Stabæk IF, and is the younger brother of retired ski racer, Lotte Smiseth Sejersted.

== World Cup results ==
=== Season standings ===
Season
| Season | Age | Overall | Slalom | Giant slalom | Super-G | Downhill | Combined |
| 2014 | 19 | 113 | — | — | 45 | — | — |
| 2016 | 21 | 133 | — | — | 46 | — | — |
| 2017 | 22 | 76 | — | — | 24 | 40 | 30 |
| 2018 | 23 | 63 | — | — | 20 | 35 | — |
| 2019 | 24 | 34 | — | — | 13 | 24 | — |
| 2020 | 25 | 64 | — | — | 24 | 25 | — |
| 2021 | 26 | 52 | — | — | 9 | 35 | —N/a |
| 2022 | 27 | 64 | — | — | 18 | 39 | —N/a |
| 2023 | 28 | 40 | — | — | 25 | 18 | —N/a |
| 2024 | 29 | 47 | — | — | 18 | 29 | —N/a |
| 2025 | 30 | 29 | — | — | 15 | 14 | —N/a |
| 2026 | 31 | 27 | — | — | 16 | 16 | —N/a |

=== Race podiums ===
- 0 wins
- 3 podiums - (2 SG, 1 DH), 28 top tens

Season
| Season | Date | Location | Discipline | Place |
| 2021 | 12 December 2020 | Val d'Isere, France | Super-G | 2nd |
| 2021 | 29 December 2020 | Bormio, Italy | Super-G | 3rd |
| 2026 | 4 December 2025 | Beaver Creek, United States | Downhill | 3rd |

== World Championship results ==
Year
| Year | Age | Slalom | Giant slalom | Super-G | Downhill | Combined | Team combined |
| 2019 | 24 | — | — | 8 | 14 | 16 | —N/a |
| 2023 | 28 | — | — | 7 | 16 | DNF1 | —N/a |
| 2025 | 30 | — | — | 3 | 6 | —N/a | 9 |

== Olympic results ==
Year
| Year | Age | Slalom | Giant slalom | Super-G | Downhill | Combined | Team combined |
| 2022 | 27 | — | — | 4 | 11 | — | —N/a |
| 2026 | 31 | — | — | 12 | DNF | —N/a | 12 |
