= Travis Ganong =

American alpine skier (born 1988)

Personal information
- Full name: Travis Scott Ganong
- Born: July 14, 1988 (age 38) Truckee, California, U.S.
- Height: 5 ft 11 in (180 cm)

Skiing career
- Sport: Alpine skiing
- Club: Squaw Valley Ski Club
- Disciplines: Downhill, Super-G
- World Cup debut: November 28, 2009 (age 21)

Olympics
- Teams: 2 – (2014, 2022)
- Medals: 0

World Championships
- Teams: 7 – (2011–2023)
- Medals: 1 (0 gold)

World Cup
- Seasons: 14 – (2010–2023)
- Wins: 2 – (2 DH)
- Podiums: 6 – (5 DH, 1 SG)
- Overall titles: 0 – (20th in 2022)
- Discipline titles: 0 – (9th in DH, 2014)
Medal record
Men's alpine skiing
Representing the United States
World Championships
Silver medal – second place	2015 Beaver Creek	Downhill

Travis Scott Ganong (born July 14, 1988) is an American World Cup alpine ski racer and specializes in the speed events of downhill and super-G. Born and raised in Truckee, California, he competed for the U.S. at the 2014 Winter Olympics in Sochi, and placed fifth in the downhill at Rosa Khutor, 0.41 seconds behind the winner.

Ganong gained his first World Cup victory in December 2014 in a downhill in Santa Caterina, Italy. At his third World Championships in 2015 at Beaver Creek, Colorado, he won the silver medal in the downhill. Ganong injured his right knee (ACL) in late December 2017 at Bormio and missed the rest of the season, including the 2018 Olympics.

Ganong has been in a relationship with Canadian alpine racer Marie-Michèle Gagnon since 2008. The pair met through mutual friend Louis-Pierre Hélie. In 2014, the couple moved to a new home in Lake Tahoe, California. They announced their engagement in September 2021. They married on July 20, 2024.

== World Cup results ==
=== Season standings ===
Season	Age	Overall	Slalom	Giant slalom	Super-G	Downhill	Combined
2010	21	149	—	—	53	—	—
2011	22	115	—	—	45	44	—
2012	23	88	—	—	60	30	—
2013	24	57	—	—	45	18	—
2014	25	23	—	—	19	9	—
2015	26	29	—	—	27	11	—
2016	27	25	—	—	19	11	—
2017	28	22	—	—	15	12	—
2018	29	106	—	—	31	55	—
2019	30	44	—	—	16	20	—
2020	31	24	—	—	12	13	—
2021	32	40	—	—	16	18	—N/a
2022	33	20	—	—	14	11	—N/a
2023	34	35	—	—	46	11	—N/a

Standings through February 5, 2023

=== Race podiums ===
- 2 wins – (2 DH)
- 6 podiums – (5 DH, 1 SG); 46 top tens – (32 DH, 14 SG)

Season	Date	Location	Discipline	Place
2014	March 1, 2014	Kvitfjell, Norway	Downhill	3rd
2015	December 28, 2014	Santa Caterina, Italy	Downhill	1st
2016	November 28, 2015	Lake Louise, Canada	Downhill	3rd
2017	January 27, 2017	Garmisch-Partenkirchen, Germany	Downhill	1st
2022	December 3, 2021	(United States) Beaver Creek, USA	Super-G	3rd
2023	January 21, 2023	Kitzbühel, Austria	Downhill	3rd

== World Championship results ==
Year	Age	Slalom	Giant slalom	Super-G	Downhill	Combined
2011	22	—	—	18	24	—
2013	24	—	—	—	DNF	—
2015	26	—	—	DNF	2	—
2017	28	—	—	14	25	—
2019	30	—	—	DNF	26	—
2021	32	—	—	8	12	—
2023	34	—	—	30	28	—

== Olympic results ==
Year	Age	Slalom	Giant slalom	Super-G	Downhill	Combined
2014	25	—	—	23	5	—
2018	29	Injured, did not compete				
2022	33	—	—	12	20	—
