= 2023 Alpine Skiing World Cup – Men's super-G =

Alpine ski discipline year standings

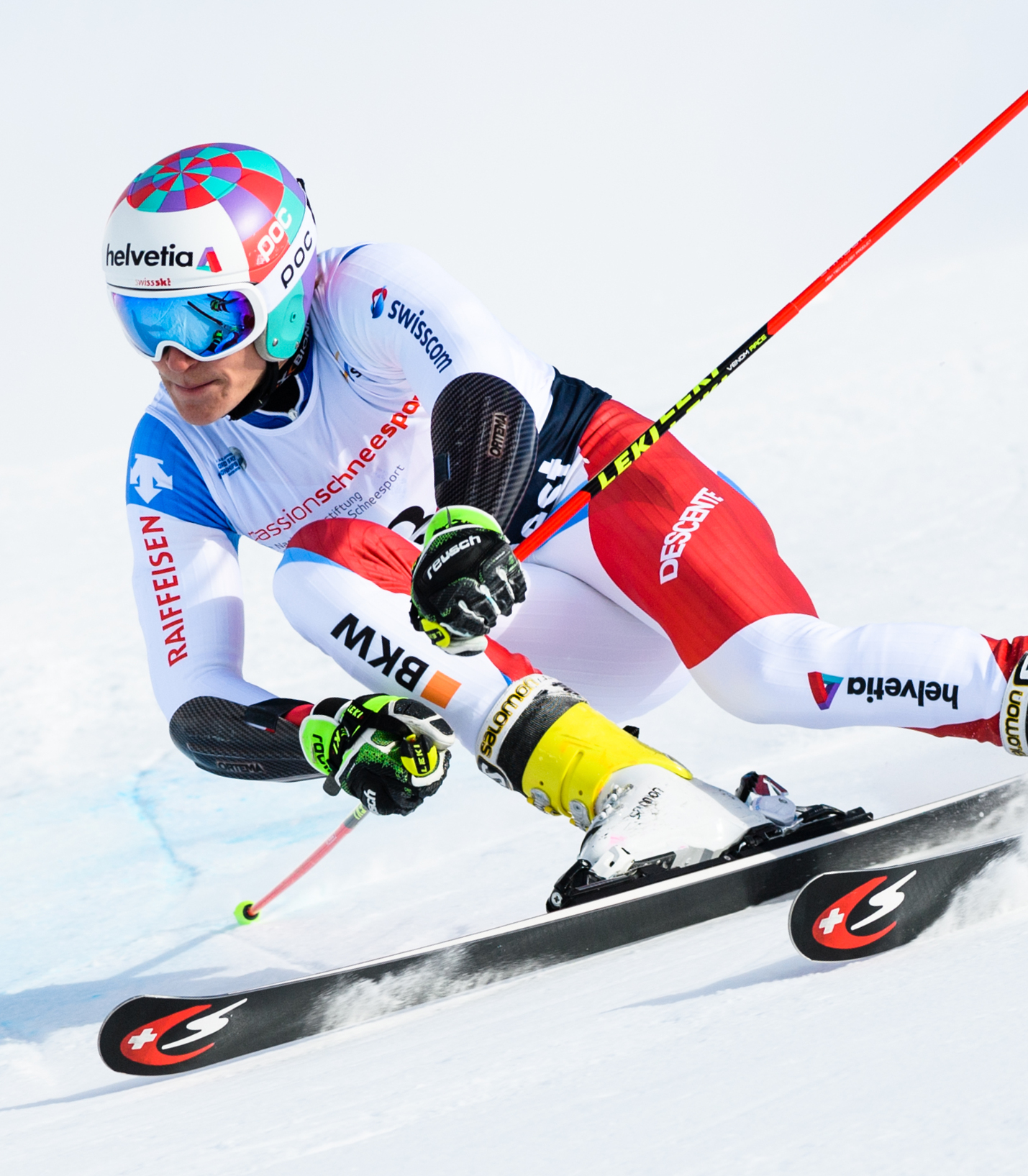
2023 Men's Super-G World Cup: Marco Odermatt of Switzerland, season champion; 2023 Men's World Cup; Overall • Downhill • Super-G; Giant slalom • Slalom
Previous: 2022	Next: 2024

The men's super-G in the 2023 Alpine Skiing World Cup consisted of eight events, including the final. The season was originally planned with eight races, but two were cancelled early in the season and were not planned to be rescheduled. However, when two races planned at Garmisch-Partenkirchen on 28–29 January 2023 were cancelled due to a lack of snow, the two previously cancelled Super-G races were rescheduled on those dates at Cortina d'Ampezzo, restoring the original Super-G schedule plan.

After four events, both defending champion Aleksander Aamodt Kilde and last year's runner-up Marco Odermatt had won two races each and finished second once, but Odermatt led the standings by 28 points due to the fourth result (third versus eighth). Odermatt then won the fifth race (with Kilde second) to add to his lead, and after he won the sixth race as well, his discipline lead was up to 148 points over Kilde. Odermatt then won the next-to-last Super-G of the season in Aspen to close out Kilde, who finished third, and clinch the discipline championship for the season.

The season was interrupted by the 2023 World Ski Championships in the linked resorts of Courchevel and Méribel, France from 6–19 February 2023. Although the Alpine Skiing branch of the International Ski Federation (FIS) conducts both the World Cup and the World Championships, the World Championships are organized by nation (a maximum of four skiers is generally permitted per nation), and (since 1970) the results count only for World Championship medals, not for World Cup points. Accordingly, the results in the World Championship are highlighted in blue and shown in this table by ordinal position only in each discipline. The men's super-G was held in Courchevel on 9 February.

The World Cup discipline final took place on 16 March 2023 in Soldeu, Andorra. Only the top 25 in the Super-G discipline ranking and the winner of the Junior World Championship were eligible to compete in the final, except that all skiers who have scored at least 500 points in the overall classification may participate in all disciplines (but none did in Super-G). Only the top 15 finishers in each discipline scored points.

== Standings ==
	Venue	27 Dec 2022; Lake Louise	4 Dec 2022; Beaver Creek	29 Dec 2022; Bormio	13 Jan 2023; Wengen	28 Jan 2023; Cortina d'Ampezzo	29 Jan 2023; Cortina d'Ampezzo	9 Feb 2023; Courchevel WC	5 Mar 2023; Aspen	16 Mar 2023; Soldeu	
#	Skier	(Canada)	(United States)	(Italy)	(Switzerland)	(Italy)	(Italy)	(France)	(United States)	(Andorra)	Total
	(Switzerland) Marco Odermatt	100	80	100	60	100	100	④	100	100	740
2	(Norway) Aleksander Aamodt Kilde	80	100	32	100	80	DNF	②	60	60	512
3	(Austria) Vincent Kriechmayr	50	29	80	50	45	45	⑫	36	DNF	335
4	(Germany) Andreas Sander	45	22	11	8	9	50	⑨	80	40	265
5	(France) Alexis Pinturault	22	60	45	16	22	40	③	24	24	253
6	(Switzerland) Stefan Rogentin	29	16	36	80	12	DNF	⑲	7	0	180
7	(Switzerland) Justin Murisier	0	14	20	24	24	36	DNS	32	26	176
8	(Austria) Daniel Hemetsberger	36	2	50	9	DNF	60	⑭	DNF	18	175
9	(Italy) Dominik Paris	13	0	DNF	45	0	80	DNF	DNF	36	174
10	(Austria) Stefan Babinsky	5	10	29	1	50	20	⑮	50	0	165
11	(Switzerland) Gino Caviezel	0	50	26	32	7	8	DNF	18	20	161
12	(France) Nils Allègre	32	8	22	22	5	24	㉑	29	16	158
13	(Austria) Marco Schwarz	0	7	DNS	13	29	22	⑥	DNF	80	151
14	(Italy) Mattia Casse	4	12	3	20	60	DNF	⑬	12	32	143
15	(Austria) Raphael Haaser	16	40	DNF	10	14	32	⑤	DNF	29	141
16	(Switzerland) Loïc Meillard	0	0	60	29	DNF	DNF	⑧	45	0	134
	(Canada) Jeffrey Read	10	11	14	0	36	8	⑪	10	45	134
18	(United States) Ryan Cochran-Siegle	0	DNF	20	40	10	0	⑱	13	50	133
19	(Canada) James Crawford	26	24	40	DNF	16	DNF	①	24	DNF	130
20	(Italy) Guglielmo Bosca	24	1	DNS	12	0	29	㉖	6	22	94
21	(Austria) Matthias Mayer	60	26	DNS							86
22	(Germany) Romed Baumann	14	32	0	DNF	DNF	0	㉗	20	0	66
23	(France) Cyprien Sarrazin	0	22	DNF	7	32	DNF	DNS			61
24	(Canada) Brodie Seger	20	DNF	0	11	13	15	⑨	DNS		59
25	(Norway) Adrian Smiseth Sejersted	DNF	DNF	24	16	18	DNF	⑦	DNF	DNF	58
26	(France) Blaise Giezendanner	0	0	DSQ	26	11	18	㉓	2	NE	57
27	(Italy) Christof Innerhofer	7	0	12	DNF	DNF	26	⑳	8	NE	53
	(Italy) Matteo Marsaglia	0	0	6	DNS	26	10	DNS	11	NE	53
29	(Canada) Riley Seger	4	DNF	16	DNF	DNF	6	DNS	26	NE	52
30	(France) Matthieu Bailet	45	DNF	DNS						NE	45
	(Norway) Atle Lie McGrath	0	45	DNS				DNF	DNS		45
32	(Austria) Lukas Feurstein	DNS		4	0	40	DNF	DNS		NE	44
33	(Switzerland) Beat Feuz	0	6	DNS	36	DNS					42
34	(Switzerland) Niels Hintermann	9	0	DNS	18	0	DNF	DNS	14	NE	41
35	(Liechtenstein) Nico Gauer	DNF	DNS	0	0	DNS		㉜	40	NE	40
	(Austria) Andreas Ploier	DNS		14	6	20	DNF	DNS	0	NE	40
37	(Switzerland) Gilles Roulin	DNS	0	0	DNS	15	14	DNS	9	NE	38
38	(Chile) Henrik Von Appen	13	18	0	0	DNF	0	㉔	6	NE	37
39	(Norway) Lucas Braathen	0	36	DNS						NE	36
40	(Slovenia) Martin Čater	11	9	6	0	0	5	DNF	DNF	NE	31
	(France) Johan Clarey	15	0	DNF	DNS	DNF	16	DNS	DNF	NE	31
42	(United States) Erik Arvidsson	DNF	DNS	10	0	0	0	DNS	18	NE	28
43	(Germany) Josef Ferstl	4	0	15	4	0	1	DNF	0	NE	24
44	(United States) Jared Goldberg	0	0	2	DNF	DNS			18	NE	20
45	(United States) River Radamus	0	15	DNF	DNS	4	0	⑯	DNF	NE	19
46	(Germany) Simon Jocher	18	DNS			DNF	DNF	㉙	DNS	NE	18
	(United States) Kyle Negomir	8	DNF	7	0	0	3	⑰	0	NE	18
48	(Austria) Julian Schütter	0	13	0	3	DNS				NE	16
49	(United States) Travis Ganong	0	DNF	0	14	DNS		㉚	DNS	NE	14
	(Italy) Florian Schieder	DNS		1	0	DNF	13	DNS	DNF	NE	14
51	(Czech Republic) Jan Zabystřan	DNS				0	12	DNF	DNS	NE	12
52	(Canada) Cameron Alexander	DNS		0	DNF	0	11	DNS		NE	11
	(Austria) Otmar Striedinger	6	5	DNF	0	DNF	DNF	DNS	DNF	NE	11
54	(Switzerland) Alexis Monney	DNS		8	0	2	DNF	DNS		NE	10
	(Canada) Broderick Thompson	0	3	0	3	DNF	4	DNF	0	NE	10
56	(Italy) Giovanni Franzoni	DSQ	DNF	9	DNF	DNS				NE	9
	(Switzerland) Christoph Krenn	DSF	0	DNS		DNF	9	DNS		NE	9
	(France) Florian Loriot	DNS			0	9	0	DNS		NE	9
59	(Slovenia) Miha Hrobat	0	DNS			6	DNF	㉘	DNF	NE	6
	(France) Adrien Théaux	0	DNS	0	6	0	DNF	DNS	0	NE	6
61	(United States) Bryce Bennett	0	0	DNF	0	0	2	DNS	3	NE	5
62	(Italy) Giovanni Borsotti	DNS							4	NE	4
	(Canada) Trevor Philp	0	4	DNF	0	0	DNF	DNS		NE	4
64	(Italy) Matteo Franzoso	DNF	0	DNF	0	3	DNF	DNS		NE	3
65	(Austria) Daniel Danklmaier	DNS				DNF	DNF	DNS	2	NE	2
66	(Germany) Dominik Schwaiger	DNS	0	DNF	DNS	1	0	DNS		NE	1
	(Austria) Christian Walder	1	DNS							NE	1
	References										

=== Legend ===
- Winner (100 points)
- 2nd place (80 points)
- 3rd place (60 points)
- DNF = Did not finish
- DSQ = Disqualified
- Did not start (DNS)
- Not eligible for finals (NE)
- Race canceled (x)
- FIS non-World Cup race (World Championships)
- Updated at 16 March 2023, after all events.

== See also ==
- 2023 Alpine Skiing World Cup – Men's summary rankings
- 2023 Alpine Skiing World Cup – Men's overall
- 2023 Alpine Skiing World Cup – Men's downhill
- 2023 Alpine Skiing World Cup – Men's giant slalom
- 2023 Alpine Skiing World Cup – Men's slalom
- World Cup scoring system
