= 2023 Alpine Skiing World Cup – Men's downhill =

Alpine ski discipline year standings

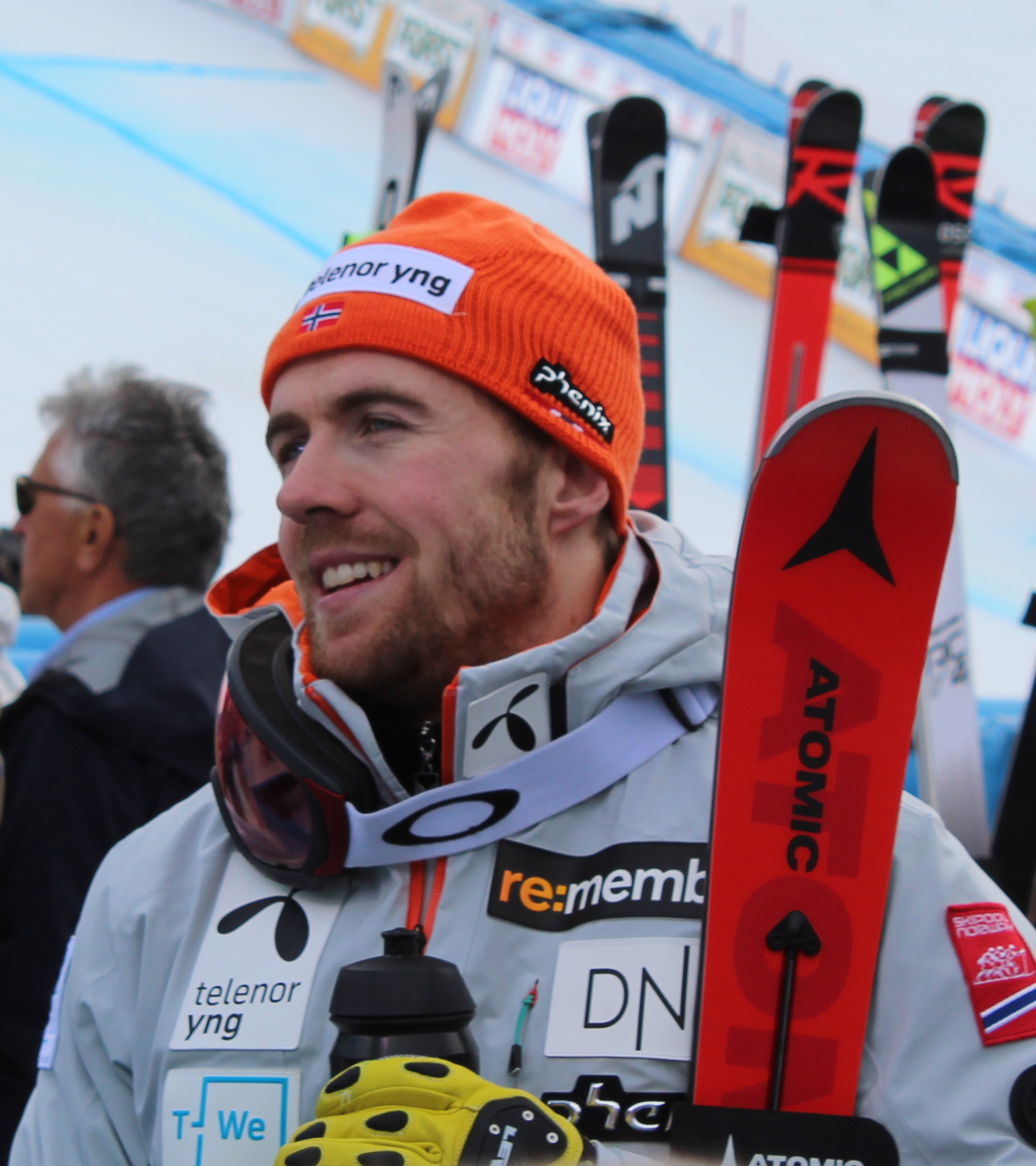
2023 Men's downhill World Cup: Aleksander Aamodt Kilde of Norway, discipline champion for second straight year; 2023 Men's World Cup; Overall • Downhill • Super-G; Giant slalom • Slalom
Previous: 2022	Next: 2024

The men's downhill in the 2023 FIS Alpine Skiing World Cup consisted of ten events, including the final. The season had been planned with fourteen downhills, but early in the season, two scheduled downhills on 29/30 October 2022 on the Matterhorn, running from Switzerland (Zermatt) into Italy (Cervinia), were canceled due to lack of snow and not rescheduled. Later in the season, a downhill scheduled for Garmisch-Partenkirchen on 28 January 2023 was also cancelled for lack of snow and not rescheduled. Finally, on 3 March, a scheduled downhill at Aspen was canceled due to poor visibility and deteriorating weather conditions, even though 24 racers had already started. The first out of the starting gate, Norway's Adrian Smiseth Sejersted, held the lead and was hoping for six more competitors to start so that the race would become official, but the weather conditions prevented that.

After eight events, defending champion Aleksander Aamodt Kilde of Norway had won five times, and held more than a 150-point lead over three-time winner Vincent Kriechmayr of Austria. The remaining downhills will take place in March 2023, by which time four-time former discipline champion Beat Feuz of Switzerland will have retired, joining longtime star Matthias Mayer of Austria with an in-season retirement, even though both were currently in the top 10 in the discipline. After another cancelation, Kilde won the downhill in Aspen, thus clinching the season championship prior to the finals.

The season was interrupted by the 2023 World Ski Championships in the linked resorts of Courchevel and Méribel, France from 6–19 February 2023. Although the Alpine skiing branch of the International Ski Federation (FIS) conducts both the World Cup and the World Championships, the World Championships are organized by nation (a maximum of four skiers is generally permitted per nation), and (since 1970) the results count only for World Championship medals, not for World Cup points. Accordingly, the results in the World Championship are highlighted in blue and shown in this table by ordinal position only in each discipline. The men's downhill was held on 12 February at Courchevel on the L'Éclipse course.

The season final took place on 15 March at Soldeu, Andorra. Eligible to partake were the top 25 in the downhill standings, others who have at least 500 points in the overall standings, and the downhill gold medalist at the Junior World Championships. With the reduced field, only the top 15 earned points.

== Standings ==
	Venue	29 Oct 2022; Zermatt/Cervinia	30 Oct 2022; Zermatt/Cervinia	26 Nov 2022; Lake Louise	3 Dec 2022; Beaver Creek	15 Dec 2022; Val Gardena/Gröden	17 Dec 2022; Val Gardena/Gröden	28 Dec 2022; Bormio	14 Jan 2023; Wengen	20 Jan 2023; Kitzbühel	21 Jan 2023; Kitzbühel	28 Jan 2023; Garmisch-Partenkirchen	12 Feb 2023; Courchevel WC	3 Mar 2023; Aspen	4 Mar 2023; Aspen	15 Mar 2023; Soldeu	
#	Skier	(Switzerland) (Italy)	(Switzerland) (Italy)	(Canada)	(United States)	(Italy)	(Italy)	(Italy)	(Switzerland)	(Austria)	(Austria)	(Germany)	(France)	(United States)	(United States)	(Andorra)	Total
	(Norway) Aleksander Aamodt Kilde	x	x	100	100	45	100	60	100	15	100	x	②	x	100	40	760
2	(Austria) Vincent Kriechmayr	x	x	24	45	100	0	100	50	100	45	x	⑪	x	50	100	614
3	(Switzerland) Marco Odermatt	x	x	60	80	80	36	50	80	0	DNS	x	①	x	60	16	462
4	(France) Johan Clarey	x	x	40	13	50	80	DNF	DNS	13	80	x	㉓	x	45	22	343
5	(Canada) James Crawford	x	x	0	60	36	45	80	2	0	3	x	⑤	x	80	20	326
6	(Italy) Mattia Casse	x	x	11	9	0	60	29	60	14	50	x	⑳	x	15	40	288
7	(Switzerland) Niels Hintermann	x	x	36	29	14	DNF	DNS	36	60	26	x	⑫	x	40	26	267
8	(Germany) Romed Baumann	x	x	26	40	0	14	13	15	0	32	x	⑲	x	24	80	244
9	(Austria) Daniel Hemetsberger	x	x	80	24	DNF	0	24	18	0	32	x	⑭	x	11	50	239
10	(Italy) Florian Schieder	x	x	0	3	20	0	20	12	80	22	x	⑦	x	36	29	222
11	(Italy) Dominik Paris	x	x	DNF	11	0	0	26	29	45	18	x	⑧	x	36	45	210
12	(Austria) Otmar Striedinger	x	x	18	14	22	22	0	14	18	40	x	DNF	x	20	32	200
13	(Austria) Matthias Mayer	x	x	50	50	60	22	DNS									182
14	(Switzerland) Beat Feuz	x	x	45	29	29	13	DNS	45	3	15	DNS					179
15	(United States) Travis Ganong	x	x	20	4	1	36	7	0	36	60	x	㉘	x	14	0	178
16	(Germany) Andreas Sander	x	x	0	12	18	9	DNS	0	16	12	x	㉙	x	29	60	156
17	(United States) Ryan Cochran-Siegle	x	x	29	36	18	6	45	DNF	0	11	x	㉔	x	4	0	149
	(Norway) Adrian Smiseth Sejersted	x	x	1	16	1	26	0	16	45	20	x	⑯	x	DNF	24	149
19	(Switzerland) Stefan Rogentin	x	x	12	24	26	7	16	20	0	7	x	DNS	x	18	0	130
20	(France) Adrien Théaux	x	x	2	0	18	50	18	13	0	16	x	㉞	x	6	0	123
21	(Germany) Josef Ferstl	x	x	9	18	40	3	DNF	7	0	24	x	㉗	x	13	0	114
22	(United States) Jared Goldberg	x	x	0	0	8	29	DNF	11	50	DNF	x	㉖	x	12	0	110
23	(Canada) Cameron Alexander	x	x	DNS		0	0	22	DNF	12	40	x	③	x	9	18	101
24	(France) Nils Allègre	x	x	0	0	32	24	0	10	8	6	x	㉑	x	5	0	85
25	(France) Cyprien Sarrazin	x	x	DNS	0	12	40	4	DNF	26	DNF	x	DNS				82
26	(Switzerland) Gilles Roulin	x	x	7	8	0	0	32	32	0	0	x	DNS	x	0	NE	79
27	(Switzerland) Alexis Monney	x	x	0	0	13	5	10	26	24	0	x	⑱	x	DNF	NE	78
28	(Switzerland) Justin Murisier	x	x	DNS	0	0	DNS	36	0	22	13	x	⑫	DNS	0	NE	71
29	(Germany) Thomas Dreßen	x	x	32	7	0	DNS		8	20	DNF	x	⑩	x	DNF	NE	67
	(Slovenia) Miha Hrobat	x	x	15	0	0	12	DNS	3	36	1	x	⑧	x	0	NE	67
31	(Austria) Marco Schwarz	x	x	DNS					40	DNS		x	④	x	24	0	64
32	(Italy) Christof Innerhofer	x	x	13	0	8	0	9	1	9	14	x	DNS	x	9	NE	63
33	(United States) Sam Morse	x	x	0	0	26	16	0	0	0	DNF	x	DNS	x	18	NE	60
34	(Switzerland) Urs Kryenbühl	x	x	0	DNS	0	18	40	DNS							NE	58
35	(United States) Bryce Bennett	x	x	0	5	2	8	DNF	5	2	9	x	DNS	x	26	NE	57
36	(Italy) Matteo Marsaglia	x	x	3	15	0	0	11	24	0	DNS	x	⑮	x	2	NE	55
	(Canada) Broderick Thompson	x	x	0	0	0	15	0	0	29	10	x	DNS	x	1	NE	55
38	(France) Matthieu Bailet	x	x	16	32	6	0	DNS								NE	54
39	(Canada) Brodie Seger	x	x	5	0	0	11	15	0	6	8	x	DNF	DNS		NE	45
40	(France) Maxence Muzaton	x	x	8	DNS			0	24	0	2	x	⑥	x	10	NE	44
41	(Germany) Dominik Schwaiger	x	x	22	20	DNF	0	DNF	0	0	0	x	DNS	x	0	NE	42
42	(Slovenia) Martin Čater	x	x	10	10	0	0	0	7	7	5	x	㉟	x	DNF	NE	39
43	(United States) Erik Arvidsson	x	x	0	0	0	0	15	DNF	10	0	x	⑰	x	0	NE	25
44	(Austria) Julian Schütter	x	x	0	0	0	2	9	10	DNF	DNF	x	DNS			NE	21
45	(Canada) Jeffrey Read	x	x	4	0	0	0	12	0	0	0	x	㉛	x	3	NE	19
46	(Finland) Elian Lehto	x	x	DNS		11	0	DNS	4	0	0	x	㉕	x	0	NE	15
47	(Germany) Simon Jocher	x	x	14	DNS							x	DNS	x	DNS	NE	14
48	(Italy) Nicolo Molteni	x	x	6	6	0	0	0	0	0	0	x	DNS	x	0	NE	12
	(Austria) Christopher Neumayer	x	x	DNS		10	2	DNS								NE	12
50	(France) Blaise Giezendanner	x	x	0	2	3	0	1	0	1	4	x	DNS	x	0	NE	11
	(Switzerland) Josua Mettler	x	x	DNS				0	DNS	11	0	x	DNS			NE	11
	(Switzerland) Lars Rösti	x	x	0	0	0	11	DNS	DNF	DNS		x	DNS	x	0	NE	11
53	(Austria) Stefan Babinsky	x	x	0	0	9	0	0	0	0	0	x	㉜	x	0	NE	9
54	(Norway) Henrik Røa	x	x	0	0	0	4	4	DNS	0	DNS					NE	8
55	(Italy) Guglielmo Bosca	x	x	0	1	6	0	DNS	DNF	0	0	x	DNS	x	0	NE	7
	(Switzerland) Marco Kohler	x	x	DNS							0	x	DNS	x	7	NE	7
	(Chile) Henrik von Appen	x	x	DNF	0	0	0	2	DNF	5	DNF	x	㉒	x	0	NE	7
58	(Italy) Pietro Zazzi	x	x	DNS	0	DNS		6	DNS	0	0	x	DNS	x	0	NE	6
59	(Italy) Giovanni Franzoni	x	x	0	0	DNS		5	DNS							NE	5
60	(Norway) Markus Nordgård Fossland	x	x	0	0	4	DNF	0	0	DNS	DNF	x	DNS	x	0	NE	4
	(Liechtenstein) Marco Pfiffner	x	x	0	0	0	0	0	0	4	0	x	㉝	DNS		NE	4
	References																

=== Legend ===
- Winner (100 points)
- 2nd place (80 points)
- 3rd place (60 points)
- DNF = Did not finish
- DSQ = Disqualified
- Did not start (DNS)
- Not eligible for finals (NE)
- Race canceled (x)
- FIS non-World Cup race (World Championships)
- Updated at 15 March 2023, after all events.

== See also ==
- 2023 Alpine Skiing World Cup – Men's summary rankings
- 2023 Alpine Skiing World Cup – Men's overall
- 2023 Alpine Skiing World Cup – Men's super-G
- 2023 Alpine Skiing World Cup – Men's giant slalom
- 2023 Alpine Skiing World Cup – Men's slalom
- World Cup scoring system
