= Alpine skiing at the 2022 Winter Olympics – Men's super-G =

Men's super-G at the XXIV Olympic Winter Games
- Alpine skiing
- Venue: Rock, Yanqing District
- Date: 8 February 2022
- Competitors: 47 from 21 nations
- Winning time: 1:19.94

Medalists
| 1st place, gold medalist(s) | | Matthias Mayer | Austria |
| 2nd place, silver medalist(s) | | Ryan Cochran-Siegle | United States |
| 3rd place, bronze medalist(s) | | Aleksander Aamodt Kilde | Norway |

Men's super-G
- Location: "Rock" course Yanqing National Alpine Ski Centre
- Vertical: 645 m (2,116 ft)
- Top elevation: 1,930 m (6,332 ft)
- Base elevation: 1,285 m (4,216 ft)

The men's super-G competition of the Beijing 2022 Olympics was held on Tuesday, 8 February, on the "Rock" course at Yanqing National Alpine Ski Centre ski resort in Yanqing District. Matthias Mayer of Austria defended his 2018 title. Ryan Cochran-Siegle of the United States won the silver medal, and Aleksander Aamodt Kilde of Norway won bronze. For Cochran-Siegle and Aamodt Kilde this was the first Olympic medal.

The 2018 silver medalist, Beat Feuz, and the bronze medalist, Kjetil Jansrud, qualified for the event. Prior to the Olympics, five World Cup super-G events were held: Aamodt Kilde was leading the ranking, followed by Marco Odermatt and Mayer. Vincent Kriechmayr was the reigning world champion, with Romed Baumann and Alexis Pinturault being the silver and bronze medalists, respectively.

== Results ==
The race was started at 11:00 local time, (UTC+8). At the starting gate, the skies were clear, the temperature was −12.4 °C (10 °F), and the snow condition was hard packed.

| Rank | Bib | Name | Country | Time | Behind |
|---|---|---|---|---|---|
| 1st place, gold medalist(s) | 13 | Matthias Mayer | Austria | 1:19.94 | — |
| 2nd place, silver medalist(s) | 14 | Ryan Cochran-Siegle | United States | 1:19.98 | +0.04 |
| 3rd place, bronze medalist(s) | 7 | Aleksander Aamodt Kilde | Norway | 1:20.36 | +0.42 |
| 4 | 10 | Adrian Smiseth Sejersted | Norway | 1:20.68 | +0.74 |
| 5 | 11 | Vincent Kriechmayr | Austria | 1:20.70 | +0.76 |
| 6 | 16 | James Crawford | Canada | 1:20.79 | +0.85 |
| 7 | 8 | Romed Baumann | Germany | 1:21.10 | +1.16 |
| 8 | 17 | Andreas Sander | Germany | 1:21.21 | +1.27 |
| 9 | 28 | Blaise Giezendanner | France | 1:21.26 | +1.32 |
| 10 | 25 | Trevor Philp | Canada | 1:21.34 | +1.40 |
| 11 | 3 | Alexis Pinturault | France | 1:21.36 | +1.42 |
| 12 | 5 | Travis Ganong | United States | 1:21.37 | +1.43 |
| 13 | 21 | Simon Jocher | Germany | 1:21.52 | +1.58 |
| 14 | 1 | Stefan Rogentin | Switzerland | 1:21.57 | +1.63 |
| 15 | 33 | River Radamus | United States | 1:21.63 | +1.69 |
| 16 | 4 | Gino Caviezel | Switzerland | 1:21.76 | +1.82 |
| 17 | 22 | Bryce Bennett | United States | 1:21.80 | +1.86 |
| 18 | 23 | Matteo Marsaglia | Italy | 1:22.16 | +2.22 |
| 18 | 12 | Josef Ferstl | Germany | 1:22.16 | +2.22 |
| 20 | 32 | Boštjan Kline | Slovenia | 1:22.55 | +2.61 |
| 21 | 6 | Dominik Paris | Italy | 1:22.62 | +2.68 |
| 22 | 40 | Joan Verdú | Andorra | 1:22.92 | +2.98 |
| 23 | 24 | Kjetil Jansrud | Norway | 1:23.00 | +3.06 |
| 24 | 38 | Nejc Naraločnik | Slovenia | 1:23.08 | +3.14 |
| 25 | 36 | Jan Zabystřan | Czech Republic | 1:23.09 | +3.15 |
| 26 | 27 | Nils Allègre | France | 1:23.24 | +3.30 |
| 27 | 34 | Henrik Von Appen | Chile | 1:23.55 | +3.61 |
| 28 | 37 | Marco Pfiffner | Liechtenstein | 1:23.66 | +3.72 |
| 29 | 31 | Rasmus Windingstad | Norway | 1:24.15 | +4.21 |
| 30 | 43 | Barnabás Szőllős | Israel | 1:24.28 | +4.34 |
| 31 | 41 | Arnaud Alessandria | Monaco | 1:24.68 | +4.74 |
| 32 | 45 | Ivan Kovbasnyuk | Ukraine | 1:25.56 | +5.62 |
| 33 | 46 | Zhang Yangming | China | 1:29.39 | +9.45 |
| 34 | 35 | Marko Vukićević | Serbia | 1:29.45 | +9.51 |
| | 2 | Matthieu Bailet | France | Did not finish | |
| | 9 | Marco Odermatt | Switzerland | Did not finish | |
| | 15 | Beat Feuz | Switzerland | Did not finish | |
| | 18 | Christof Innerhofer | Italy | Did not finish | |
| | 19 | Raphael Haaser | Austria | Did not finish | |
| | 20 | Max Franz | Austria | Did not finish | |
| | 26 | Broderick Thompson | Canada | Did not finish | |
| | 29 | Brodie Seger | Canada | Did not finish | |
| | 30 | Miha Hrobat | Slovenia | Did not finish | |
| | 39 | Jack Gower | Ireland | Did not finish | |
| | 42 | Adur Etxezarreta | Spain | Did not finish | |
| | 44 | Simon Breitfuss Kammerlander | Bolivia | Did not finish | |
| | 47 | Xu Mingfu | China | Did not finish | |
