= 2023 Alpine Skiing World Cup – Men's overall =

Alpine ski discipline year standings

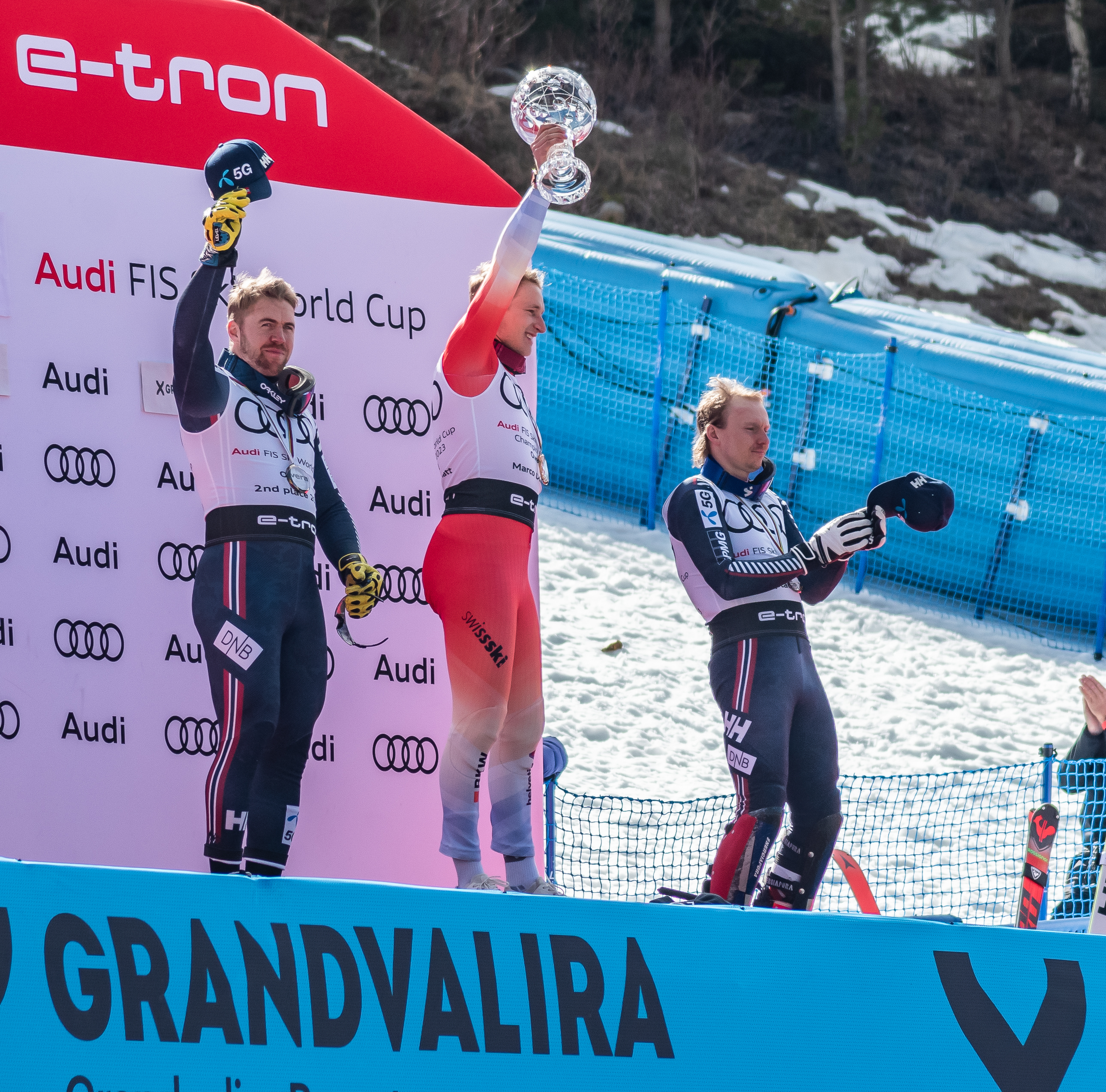
2023 Men's Overall World Cup: 2023 Men's overall World Cup podium – 1st place: Marco Odermatt (SUI), center; 2nd place: Aleksander Aamodt Kilde (NOR), left; 3rd place: Henrik Kristoffersen (NOR), right.; 2023 Men's World Cup; Overall • Downhill • Super-G; Giant slalom • Slalom
Previous: 2022	Next: 2024

The men's overall in the 2023 FIS Alpine Skiing World Cup consisted of 38 events in four disciplines: downhill (DH) (10 races), super-G (SG) (8 races), giant slalom (GS) (10 races), and slalom (SL) (10 races). The fifth and sixth disciplines in FIS ski events, parallel (PAR). and Alpine combined (AC), had all events in the 2022–23 season cancelled, either due to the schedule disruption cased by the COVID-19 pandemic (AC) or due to bad weather (PAR). The original calendar contained 43 events, but in addition to the parallel, four downhills were cancelled over the course of the season.

The season was interrupted by the 2023 World Ski Championships in the linked resorts of Courchevel and Méribel, France, which are located in Les Trois Vallées, from 6–19 February 2023. During the world championships, Norwegian star Atle Lie McGrath, who then was in 11th place overall, fell during the super-G and suffered a ACL tear, which required season-ending surgery.

== Season summary ==
From the very first race of the season, defending champion Marco Odermatt of Switzerland seized the lead in the standings due to his abilities in all disciplines except for slalom. After the first fifteen races, he had built a lead of over 300 points over speed specialist Aleksander Aamodt Kilde of Norway. However, after Odermatt was injured during a downhill at Kitzbühel on 20 January and had to miss the following few races, Kilde was able to draw within 200 points by 25 January. However, Odermatt won the next two races to push his lead back over 300 points.

When Kilde did not enter the two giant slaloms in Kranjska Gora, Slovenia on 11-12 March, Odermatt clinched the season championship due to holding a lead of over 400 points, while the maximum points potentially available to Kilde were only 400. But after winning both races, Odermatt entered the World Cup finals needing just 174 points from his three specialties to surpass Hermann Maier's men's all-time points record of 2,000 in one season, set in the 2000 season and only surpassed so far by two women: Tina Maze in 2013 and Mikaela Shiffrin in 2019 and this year. In his first two races during the finals, Odermatt finished 15th in downhill (16 points) and won the super-G (100 points), leaving him just 58 points short of Maier's record; a finish of third or better in the giant slalom would give Odermatt the record. He then won the giant slalom (by 2.11 seconds!) to set a new Men's World Cup points record of 2,042 points.

The victory also enabled Odermatt to tie the men's record of 13 victories in a season on the World Cup circuit, a record Odermatt now shares with Maier (2001), Ingemar Stenmark (1979), and Marcel Hirscher (2018) -- and behind only two women: Shiffrin (17 wins in 2019; 14 wins this year) and Vreni Schneider (14 wins in 1989).

== Finals ==
The last events of the season took place at the World Cup finals, Wednesday, 15 March 2023 through Sunday, 19 March 2023 in Soldeu, Andorra. Only the top 25 in each specific discipline for the season and the winner of the Junior World Championship in each discipline were eligible to compete in the finals, with the exception that any skier who has scored at least 500 points in the overall classification was eligible to participate in any discipline, regardless of his standing in that discipline for the season.

== Standings ==
#	Skier	DH; 10 races	SG; 8 races	GS; 10 races	SL; 10 races	Total
	(Switzerland) Marco Odermatt	462	740	840	0	2,042
2	(Norway) Aleksander Aamodt Kilde	760	512	68	0	1,340
3	(Norway) Henrik Kristoffersen	0	0	660	494	1,154
4	(Norway) Lucas Braathen	0	36	372	546	954
5	(Austria) Vincent Kriechmayr	614	335	4	0	953
6	(Switzerland) Loïc Meillard	0	134	406	337	877
7	(Austria) Marco Schwarz	64	151	449	199	863
8	(France) Alexis Pinturault	0	253	409	177	839
9	(Austria) Manuel Feller	0	0	201	345	546
10	(Switzerland) Ramon Zenhäusern	0	0	0	467	467
11	(Slovenia) Zan Kranjec	0	0	464	0	464
12	(Canada) James Crawford	326	130	6	0	462
13	(Switzerland) Gino Caviezel	0	161	277	0	438
14	(Italy) Mattia Casse	288	143	0	0	431
15	(Germany) Andreas Sander	156	265	0	0	421
16	(Austria) Daniel Hemetsberger	239	175	0	0	414
17	(Switzerland) Daniel Yule	0	0	0	401	401
18	(Italy) Dominik Paris	210	174	0	0	384
19	(France) Johan Clarey	343	31	0	0	374
20	(Norway) Atle Lie McGrath	0	45	104	215	364
21	(Norway) Alexander Steen Olsen	0	0	84	275	359
22	(Switzerland) Stefan Rogentin	130	180	0	0	310
	(Germany) Romed Baumann	244	66	0	0	310
24	(Switzerland) Niels Hintermann	267	41	0	0	308
25	(Germany) Linus Straßer	0	0	0	306	306
26	(Switzerland) Justin Murisier	71	176	50	0	297
	(Croatia) Filip Zubcic	0	0	221	76	297
28	(France) Clément Noël	0	0	0	292	292
29	(United States) Ryan Cochran-Siegle	149	133	0	0	282
30	(Austria) Raphael Haaser	0	141	133	0	274
31	(Austria) Matthias Mayer	182	86	0	0	268
32	(France) Nils Allegre	85	158	0	0	243
33	(Norway) Rasmus Windingstad	0	0	239	0	239
34	(Italy) Florian Schieder	222	14	0	0	236
35	(Norway) Timon Haugan	0	0	0	231	231
36	(Switzerland) Beat Feuz	179	42	0	0	221
37	(Italy) Tommaso Sala	0	0	0	214	214
38	(Austria) Otmar Striedinger	200	11	0	0	211
39	(Austria) Stefan Brennsteiner	0	0	210	0	210
40	(Norway) Adrian Smiseth Sejersted	149	58	0	0	207
41	(Italy) Filippo Della Vite	0	0	196	0	196
42	(United States) Travis Ganong	178	14	0	0	192
43	(Austria) Fabio Gstrein	0	0	0	190	190
44	(Bulgaria) Albert Popov	0	0	0	182	182
45	(United Kingdom) Dave Ryding	0	0	0	181	181
46	(Germany) Alexander Schmid	0	0	178	0	178
47	(Austria) Stefan Babinsky	9	165	0	0	174
48	(Italy) Alex Vinatzer	0	0	6	156	162
49	(Canada) Erik Read	0	0	88	68	156
50	(Canada) Jeffrey Read	19	134	0	0	153
51	(Sweden) Kristoffer Jakobsen	0	0	0	151	151
52	(Switzerland) Marc Rochat	0	0	0	150	150
53	(France) Cyprien Sarrazin	82	61	6	0	149
54	(Norway) Sebastian Foss-Solevåg	0	0	0	144	144
	(Austria) Adrian Pertl	0	0	0	144	144
56	(Germany) Josef Ferstl	114	24	0	0	138
57	(United States) Jared Goldberg	110	20	0	0	130
58	(France) Adrien Theaux	123	6	0	0	129
59	(Italy) Luca De Aliprandini	0	0	124	0	124
60	(Switzerland) Gilles Roulin	79	38	0	0	117
61	(Italy) Christof Innerhofer	63	53	0	0	116
62	(Switzerland) Thomas Tumler	0	0	115	0	115
63	(United States) River Radamus	0	19	95	0	114
64	(Canada) Cameron Alexander	101	11	0	0	112
65	(Italy) Matteo Marsaglia	55	53	0	0	108
66	(Canada) Brodie Seger	45	59	0	0	104
67	(Italy) Guglielmo Bosca	7	94	0	0	101
68	(Andorra) Joan Verdú	0	0	100	0	100
69	(France) Matthieu Bailet	54	45	0	0	99
70	(Greece) AJ Ginnis	0	0	0	91	91
	(Italy) Stefano Gross	0	0	0	91	91
	(Croatia) Samuel Kolega	0	0	0	91	91
73	(Switzerland) Alexis Monney	78	10	0	0	88

- Leader
- 2nd place
- 3rd place
- Updated at 19 March 2023, after all 38 events and 5 cancellations

== See also ==
- 2023 Alpine Skiing World Cup – Men's summary rankings
- 2023 Alpine Skiing World Cup – Men's downhill
- 2023 Alpine Skiing World Cup – Men's super-G
- 2023 Alpine Skiing World Cup – Men's giant slalom
- 2023 Alpine Skiing World Cup – Men's slalom
- 2023 Alpine Skiing World Cup – Women's overall
- World Cup scoring system
