= Gilles Roulin =

Swiss alpine skier

Personal information
- Born: 14 May 1994 (age 31)

Sport
- Country: Switzerland
- Sport: Alpine skiing

Gilles Roulin (born 14 May 1994) is a Swiss alpine skier who competes internationally.

He participated in the 2018 Winter Olympics.
