= 2019 Alpine Skiing World Cup – Men's combined =

Alpine ski discipline year standings

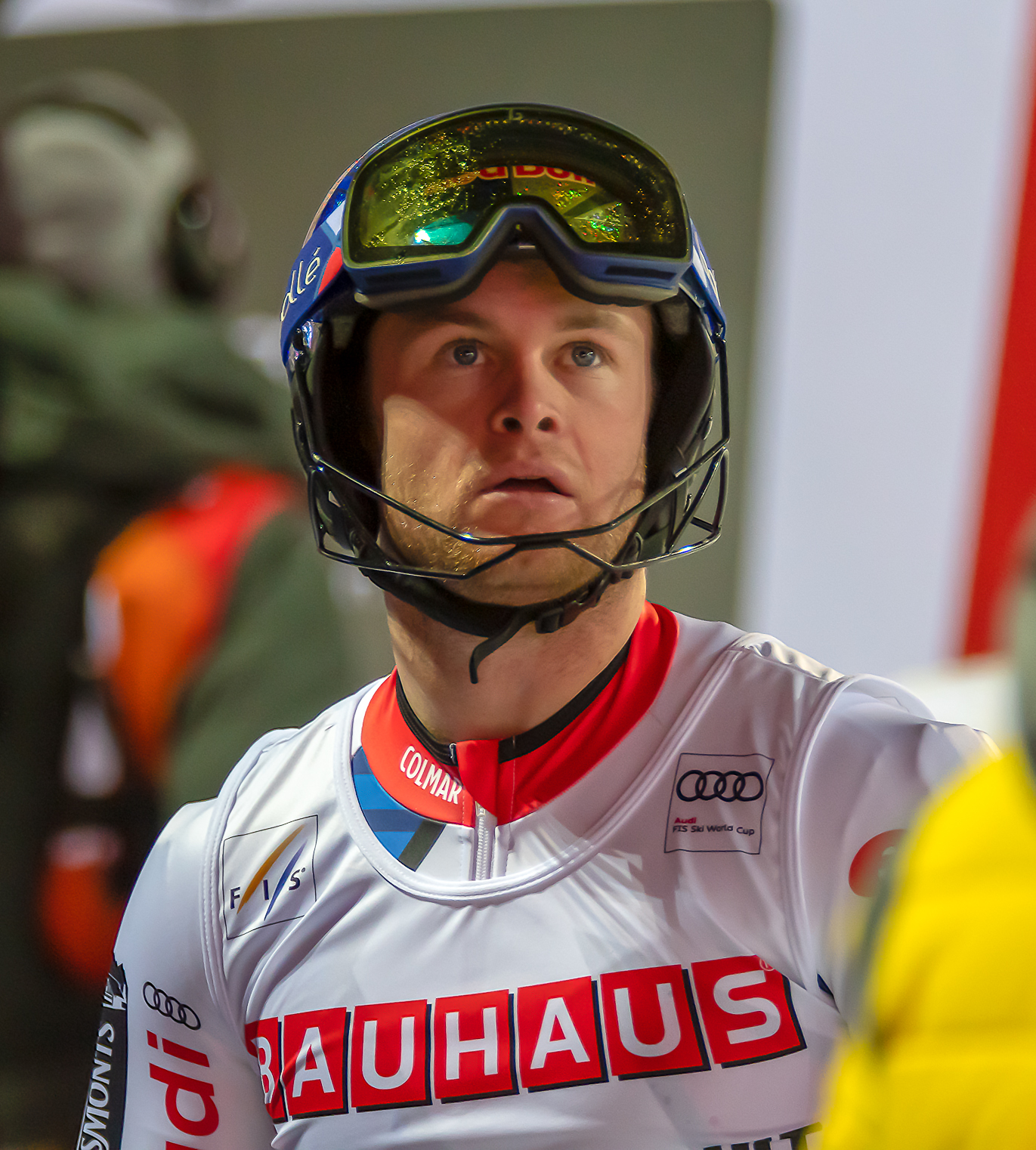
2019 Men's combined World Cup: Alexis Pinturault of France, season champion; 2019 Men's World Cup; Overall • Downhill • Super-G; Giant slalom • Slalom • Combined
Previous: 2018	Next: 2020

The Men's combined in the 2019 FIS Alpine Skiing World Cup involved two events. The only skier to podium in both was Alexis Pinturault of France, who edged out overall World Cup leader Marcel Hirscher for the title in the second race and thus won the season championship. At this time, combined races were not included in the season finals, which were scheduled in 2019 in Soldeu, Andorra.

The season was interrupted by the 2019 World Ski Championships, which were held from 4–17 February in Åre, Sweden. The men's combined was held on 11 February.

== Standings ==
#	Skier	18 Jan 2019; Wengen (Switzerland)	22 Feb 2019; Bansko (Bulgaria)	Total
	(France) Alexis Pinturault	60	100	160
2	(Austria) Marco Schwarz	100	DNS2	100
3	(Switzerland) Mauro Caviezel	50	40	90
4	(Italy) Riccardo Tonetti	32	50	82
5	(Austria) Marcel Hirscher	DNS	80	80
	(France) Victor Muffat-Jeandet	80	DNF2	80
7	(Austria) Stefan Hadalin	13	60	73
8	(Austria) Romed Baumann	45	9	54
9	(Austria) Vincent Kriechmayr	29	24	53
10	(Russia) Pavel Trikhichev	40	7	47
11	(Canada) Trevor Philp	DNS	45	45
12	(Croatia) Filip Zubčić	10	32	42
13	(United States) Ted Ligety	18	20	38
14	(Norway) Kjetil Jansrud	36	DNS2	36
	(Norway) Rasmus Windingstad	DNS	36	36
16	(Italy) Christof Innerhofer	26	8	34
17	(Germany) Linus Straßer	DNS	29	29
18	(Switzerland) Loïc Meillard	DNS	26	26
19	(Switzerland) Sandro Simonet	24	DNS	24
20	(Slovenia) Martin Čater	22	DNS	22
	(Austria) Johannes Strolz	DNS	22	22
	(United States) Bryce Bennett	16	6	22
23	(Switzerland) Stefan Rogentin	8	13	21
24	(France) Thomas Mermillod-Blondin	20	DNF2	20
	(France) Nils Allègre	9	11	20
	References			

- Winner
- 2nd place
- 3rd place
- DNS = Did Not Start
- DNS2 = Finished run 1; Did Not Start run 2
- DNF1 = Did Not Finish run 1
- DNF2 = Did Not Finish run 2
- Updated at 18 March 2019, after all events.

== See also ==
- 2019 Alpine Skiing World Cup – Men's summary rankings
- 2019 Alpine Skiing World Cup – Men's overall
- 2019 Alpine Skiing World Cup – Men's downhill
- 2019 Alpine Skiing World Cup – Men's super-G
- 2019 Alpine Skiing World Cup – Men's giant slalom
- 2019 Alpine Skiing World Cup – Men's slalom
- World Cup scoring system
