= 2019 Alpine Skiing World Cup – Men's downhill =

Alpine ski discipline year standings

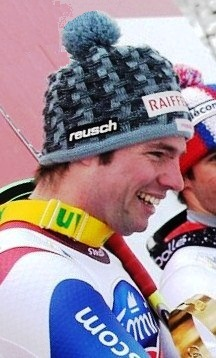
2019 Men's downhill World Cup: Beat Feuz of Switzerland, season champion; 2019 Men's World Cup; Overall • Downhill • Super-G; Giant slalom • Slalom • Combined
Previous: 2018	Next: 2020

The men's downhill in the 2019 FIS Alpine Skiing World Cup involved eight events. Swiss skier Beat Feuz won his second consecutive season title in this discipline.

The season was interrupted by the 2019 World Ski Championships, which were held from 4–17 February in Åre, Sweden. The men's downhill was held on 9 February.

== Standings ==
Rank	Name	21 Nov 2018; Lake Louise (Canada)	1 Dec 2018; Beaver Creek (United States)	15 Dec 2018; Val Gardena/Gröden (Italy)	28 Dec 2018; Bormio (Italy)	19 Jan 2019; Wengen (Switzerland)	25 Jan 2019; Kitzbühel (Austria)	2 Mar 2019; Kvitfjell (Norway)	13 Mar 2019; Soldeu (Andorra)	Total
	(Switzerland) Beat Feuz	40	100	60	60	80	80	80	40	540
2	(Italy) Dominik Paris	60	22	14	100	24	100	100	100	520
3	(Austria) Vincent Kriechmayr	50	45	9	45	100	DNF	45	45	339
4	(Norway) Aleksander Aamodt Kilde	16	10	100	29	60	13	24	32	284
5	(Switzerland) Mauro Caviezel	7	80	32	18	36	9	50	50	282
6	(Italy) Christof Innerhofer	80	8	13	80	29	50	16	0	276
7	(United States) Bryce Bennett	22	29	50	50	45	18	22	0	236
8	(France) Johan Clarey	45	45	20	32	22	24	26	20	234
9	(Austria) Max Franz	100	20	80	22	DNF	DNF	DNS		222
10	(Norway) Aksel Lund Svindal	32	60	36	22	50	DNS			200
11	(Austria) Otmar Striedinger	10	2	0	15	10	60	40	60	197
	(Austria) Matthias Mayer	32	16	DNF	36	DNF	29	60	24	197
13	(Norway) Kjetil Jansrud	20	14	5	DNF	9	DNS	32	80	160
14	(Germany) Josef Ferstl	0	20	22	24	3	36	15	36	156
15	(Austria) Hannes Reichelt	13	36	26	0	18	32	8	20	153
16	(United States) Steven Nyman	24	29	45	14	DNF	DNS	36	0	148
17	(Canada) Benjamin Thomsen	16	0	26	26	20	40	1	0	129
18	(France) Adrien Théaux	5	50	29	6	13	22	0	0	125
19	(Switzerland) Carlo Janka	13	24	0	0	14	DNS	10	29	90
20	(United States) Travis Ganong	0	3	40	DNS	7	12	0	26	88
21	(Italy) Emanuele Buzzi	5	9	16	8	40	DNS			78
22	(France) Matthieu Bailet	0	11	0	40	DNF	0	0	22	73
23	(Switzerland) Niels Hintermann	18	0	18	18	15	0	2	DNS	71
24	(Norway) Adrian Smiseth Sejersted	6	7	15	2	DNF	20	20	0	70
25	(Switzerland) Gilles Roulin	0	6	0	4	26	0	18	0	54
	References									

- Winner
- 2nd place
- 3rd place
- DNF = Did not finish
- DNS = Did not start
- Updated at 18 March 2019, after all events.

== See also ==
- 2019 Alpine Skiing World Cup – Men's summary rankings
- 2019 Alpine Skiing World Cup – Men's overall
- 2019 Alpine Skiing World Cup – Men's super-G
- 2019 Alpine Skiing World Cup – Men's giant slalom
- 2019 Alpine Skiing World Cup – Men's slalom
- 2019 Alpine Skiing World Cup – Men's combined
- World Cup scoring system
