= 2019 Alpine Skiing World Cup – Men's super-G =

Alpine ski discipline year standings

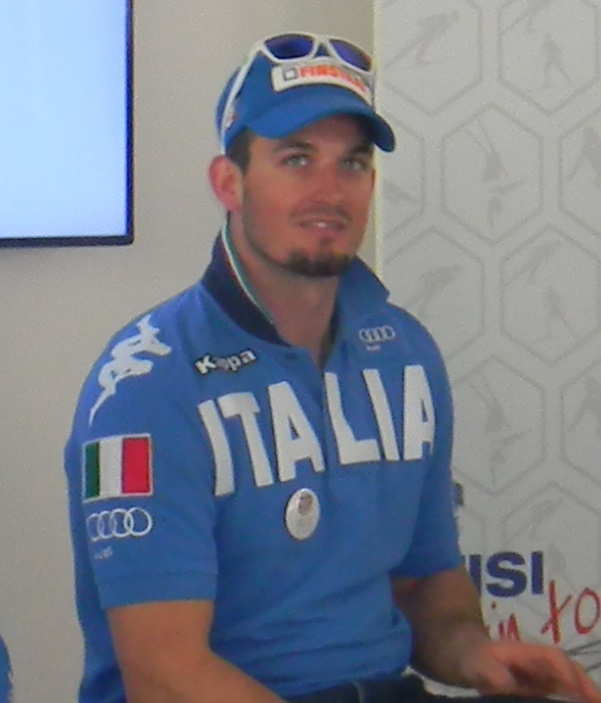
2019 Men's Super-G World Cup: Dominik Paris of Italy, season champion; 2019 Men's World Cup; Overall • Downhill • Super-G; Giant slalom • Slalom • Combined
Previous: 2018	Next: 2020

The men's super-G in the 2019 FIS Alpine Skiing World Cup involved seven events. Italian skier Dominik Paris seized the lead in the discipline from Vincent Kriechmayr of Austria by winning the next-to-last Super-G of the season in Kvitfjell, then won the crystal globe for the season by also winning the final in Soldeu, Andorra.

The season was interrupted by the 2019 World Ski Championships, which were held from 4–17 February in Åre, Sweden. The men's super-G was held on 6 February . . . and was also won by Paris.

== Standings ==
Rank	Name	25 Nov 2018; Lake Louise (Canada)	1 Dec 2018; Beaver Creek (United States)	14 Dec 2018; Val Gardena/Gröden (Italy)	29 Dec 2018; Bormio (Italy)	27 Jan 2019; Kitzbühel (Austria)	3 Mar 2019; Kvitfjell (Norway)	14 Mar 2019; Soldeu (Andorra)	Total
	(Italy) Dominik Paris	10	60	DNF	100	60	100	100	430
2	(Austria) Vincent Kriechmayr	80	36	20	50	50	50	60	346
3	(Switzerland) Mauro Caviezel	60	80	24	26	18	36	80	324
4	(Norway) Kjetil Jansrud	100	26	60	DNF	DNS	80	50	316
5	(Norway) Aleksander Aamodt Kilde	22	60	45	60	40	40	32	299
6	(Austria) Matthias Mayer	40	32	36	80	45	22	40	295
7	(Norway) Aksel Lund Svindal	46	60	100	14	DNS			219
8	(France) Johan Clarey	7	5	50	29	80	29	DNF	200
9	(Germany) Josef Ferstl	2	1	40	24	100	12	18	197
10	(Italy) Christof Innerhofer	1	7	80	DNF	29	29	45	191
11	(Austria) Max Franz	18	100	22	45	DNS			185
12	(Switzerland) Beat Feuz	26	12	15	40	DNF	60	29	182
13	(Norway) Adrian Smiseth Sejersted	32	8	32	36	29	DNF	36	173
14	(Austria) Hannes Reichelt	50	0	29	13	20	13	24	149
15	(Austria) Adrien Théaux	36	24	9	20	24	20	DNF	133
16	(United States) Travis Ganong	14	16	7	DNS	13	45	20	115
17	(France) Brice Roger	DNS			22	36	32	0	90
18	(Austria) Christian Walder	24	2	1	10	DNF	24	26	87
19	(Austria) Christoph Krenn	DNF	40	20	3	DNS	9	0	72
	(Switzerland) Marco Odermatt	6	0	0	32	16	18	DNF	72
21	(France) Alexis Pinturault	DNS	15	DNS		32	DNS	16	63
	(Slovenia) Boštjan Kline	13	0	12	0	1	15	22	63
23	(United States) Ryan Cochran-Siegle	22	14	2	9	DNS	0	0	47
24	(Germany) Andreas Sander	0	0	26	18	DNS			44
25	(Slovenia) Klemen Kosi	0	29	13	DNS	0	0	DNF	42
	References								

- Winner
- 2nd place
- 3rd place
- DNF = Did not finish
- DNS = Did not start
- Updated at 18 March 2019, after all events.

== See also ==
- 2019 Alpine Skiing World Cup – Men's summary rankings
- 2019 Alpine Skiing World Cup – Men's overall
- 2019 Alpine Skiing World Cup – Men's downhill
- 2019 Alpine Skiing World Cup – Men's giant slalom
- 2019 Alpine Skiing World Cup – Men's slalom
- 2019 Alpine Skiing World Cup – Men's combined
- World Cup scoring system
