= 2023 Alpine Skiing World Cup – Men's giant slalom =

Alpine ski discipline year standings

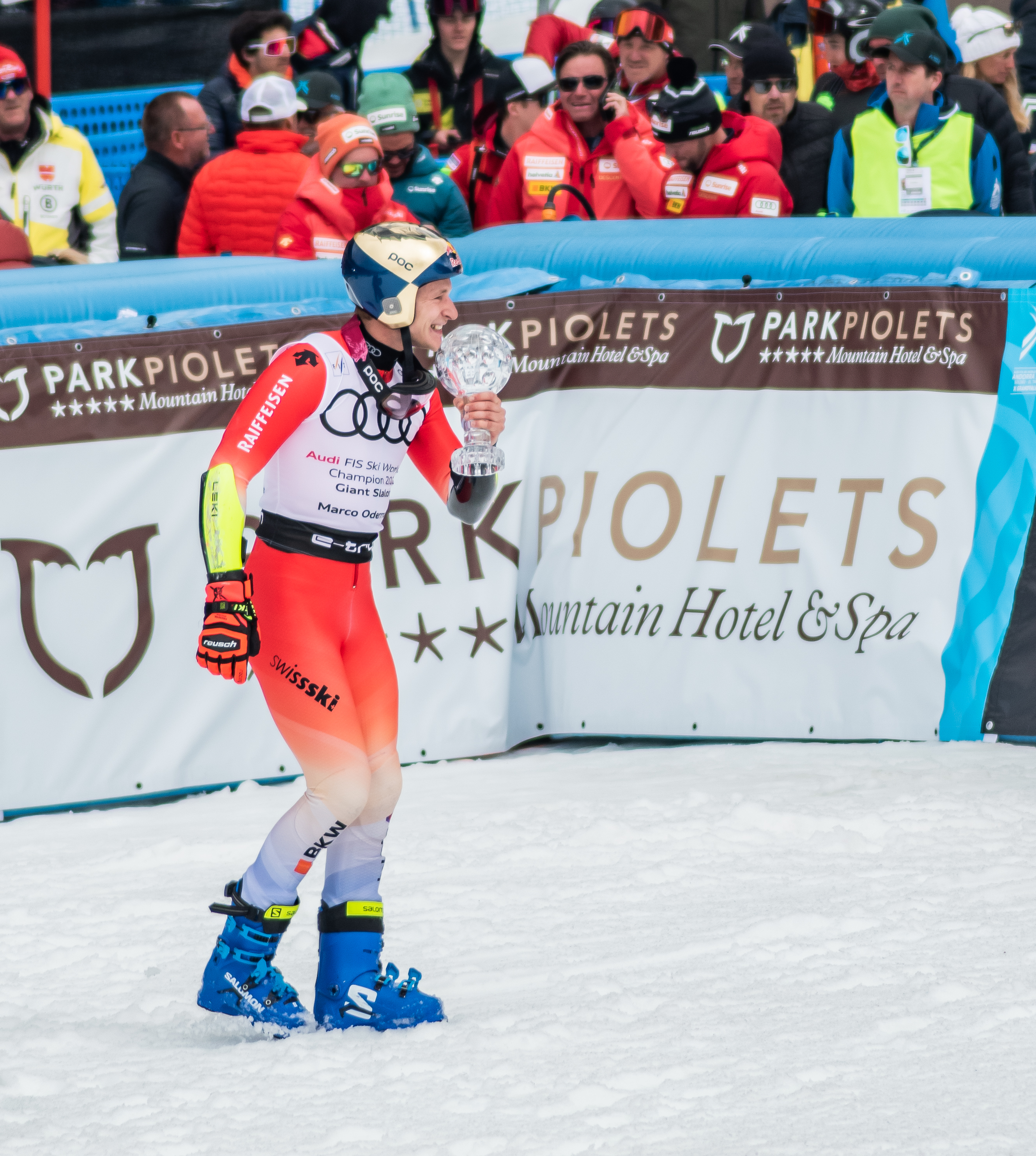
2023 Men's Giant slalom World Cup: Marco Odermatt of Switzerland, repeat discipline champion; 2023 Men's World Cup; Overall • Downhill • Super-G; Giant slalom • Slalom
| Previous: 2022 | Next: 2024 |

The men's giant slalom in the 2023 FIS Alpine Skiing World Cup consisted of ten events including the final. Defending discipline champion Marco Odermatt of Switzerland opened over a 100-point lead in the discipline by winning four of the first five races and finishing third in the other, although he then missed a race due to injury. Odermatt clinched the discipline championship by winning both giant slaloms on 11-12 March in Kranjska Gora, Slovenia.

The season was interrupted by the 2023 World Ski Championships in the linked resorts of Courchevel and Méribel, France from 6–19 February 2023. Although the Alpine skiing branch of the International Ski Federation (FIS) conducts both the World Cup and the World Championships, the World Championships are organized by nation (a maximum of four skiers is generally permitted per nation), and (after 1970) the results count only for World Championship medals, not for World Cup points. Accordingly, the results in the World Championship are highlighted in blue and shown in this table by ordinal position only in each discipline. The men's giant slalom was held in Courchevel on 17 February.

The World Cup final took place on Saturday, 18 March 2023, in Soldeu, Andorra. Only the top 25 skiers in the World Cup giant slalom discipline and the winner of the Junior World Championship in the discipline, plus any skiers who have scored at least 500 points in the World Cup overall classification for the season, were eligible to compete in the final, and only the top 15 finishers earned World Cup points in the discipline.

== Standings ==
| | Venue | 23 Oct 2022; Sölden | 10 Dec 2022; Val-d'Isère | 18 Dec 2022; Alta Badia | 19 Dec 2022; Alta Badia | 7 Jan 2023; Adelboden | 25 Jan 2023; Schladming | 9 Feb 2023; Courchevel WC | 25 Feb 2023; Palisades Tahoe | 11 Mar 2023; Kranjska Gora | 12 Mar 2023; Kranjska Gora | 18 Mar 2023; Soldeu | |
| # | Skier | (Austria) | (France) | (Italy) | (Italy) | (Switzerland) | (Austria) | (France) | (United States) | (Slovenia) | (Slovenia) | (Andorra) | Total |
| | (Switzerland) Marco Odermatt | 100 | 100 | 60 | 100 | 100 | DNS | ① | 80 | 100 | 100 | 100 | 840 |
| 2 | (Norway) Henrik Kristoffersen | 60 | 45 | 80 | 80 | 80 | 45 | ⑤ | 50 | 60 | 80 | 80 | 660 |
| 3 | (Slovenia) Žan Kranjec | 80 | 60 | 45 | 60 | 45 | 40 | ⑥ | 15 | 45 | 50 | 24 | 464 |
| 4 | (Austria) Marco Schwarz | 20 | 32 | 40 | 36 | 36 | 60 | ③ | 100 | 29 | 36 | 60 | 449 |
| 5 | (France) Alexis Pinturault | 11 | 24 | 50 | 40 | 40 | 36 | ⑦ | 36 | 80 | 60 | 32 | 409 |
| 6 | (Switzerland) Loïc Meillard | 36 | 26 | 24 | 50 | 60 | 100 | ② | 24 | 36 | 24 | 26 | 406 |
| 7 | (Norway) Lucas Braathen | 50 | 29 | 100 | DNF1 | DNF1 | 26 | DNS | 40 | 32 | 45 | 50 | 372 |
| 8 | (Switzerland) Gino Caviezel | 10 | 10 | 15 | 18 | 32 | 80 | ⑨ | 32 | 40 | 22 | 18 | 277 |
| 9 | (Norway) Rasmus Windingstad | 45 | DNF1 | DNF2 | 15 | 22 | 7 | ⑯ | 60 | 24 | 26 | 40 | 239 |
| 10 | (Croatia) Filip Zubčić | 22 | DNF1 | 26 | 32 | 26 | 20 | ⑧ | 26 | 20 | 29 | 20 | 221 |
| 11 | (Austria) Stefan Brennsteiner | DNS | 36 | 20 | 15 | 20 | 24 | ④ | 45 | 50 | DNF1 | 0 | 210 |
| 12 | (Austria) Manuel Feller | 15 | 80 | 20 | DNF1 | 50 | DNF2 | DNF2 | DNF2 | DNF1 | 12 | 24 | 201 |
| 13 | (Italy) Filippo Della Vite | DNQ | 22 | 14 | 20 | 24 | DNQ | ⑩ | 22 | 18 | 40 | 36 | 196 |
| 14 | (Germany) Alexander Schmid | 32 | 40 | 32 | 45 | DNS | 29 | ⑮ | DNF1 | DNS | | | 178 |
| 15 | (Austria) Raphael Haaser | DNQ | DNQ | DNQ | 29 | 18 | 22 | ⑬ | 29 | 15 | 20 | DNF2 | 133 |
| 16 | (Italy) Luca De Aliprandini | DNQ | DNF1 | 13 | DNF1 | 10 | DNQ | ⑭ | 14 | 26 | 32 | 29 | 124 |
| 17 | (Switzerland) Thomas Tumler | DNQ | 18 | DNQ | DNQ | 12 | 16 | ⑱ | 9 | DNF1 | 15 | 45 | 115 |
| 18 | (Norway) Atle Lie McGrath | 13 | 50 | 36 | 5 | DNF1 | DNF2 | DNS | | | | | 104 |
| 19 | (Andorra) Joan Verdú | DNF2 | DNF1 | 22 | 22 | DNF1 | 15 | DNF1 | 12 | DNF1 | 13 | 16 | 100 |
| 20 | (United States) River Radamus | 5 | 15 | DNF1 | 26 | 9 | 10 | ⑫ | DNF2 | 16 | 14 | DNF1 | 95 |
| 21 | (Canada) Erik Read | 14 | 16 | 10 | 3 | 16 | DNQ | DNF2 | 16 | 10 | 3 | DNF2 | 88 |
| 22 | (Norway) Alexander Steen Olsen | 12 | DNQ | DNF1 | DSQ2 | DNF1 | 50 | ㉒ | DNF2 | 22 | DNF1 | DNF2 | 84 |
| 23 | (United States) Tommy Ford | 40 | DNQ | DNQ | 16 | 4 | 7 | DNF2 | DNF1 | DNF1 | 10 | 0 | 77 |
| 24 | (Austria) Patrick Feurstein | 9 | 10 | 5 | 13 | 13 | DNQ | DNS | DNF1 | 12 | 7 | 0 | 69 |
| 25 | (Norway) Aleksander Aamodt Kilde | DNF2 | DNS | DNF1 | DNS | 29 | 32 | DNF1 | 7 | DNS | | 0 | 68 |
| 26 | (France) Victor Muffat-Jeandet | 24 | 13 | 16 | 9 | DNF2 | DNS | | | | | NE | 62 |
| 27 | (Belgium) Sam Maes | DNS | DNF2 | DNQ | 24 | DNF1 | DNF1 | DNS | 18 | DNQ | 18 | NE | 60 |
| 28 | (Italy) Giovanni Borsotti | 3 | 7 | DNF1 | 8 | DNQ | 13 | ⑪ | 20 | 6 | DNF1 | NE | 57 |
| 29 | (Norway) Leif Kristian Nestvold-Haugen | 18 | DNQ | 7 | DNQ | DNF1 | 12 | DNS | 11 | 8 | DNQ | NE | 56 |
| 30 | (Italy) Hannes Zingerle | DNQ | DNQ | DNS | DNQ | DNF2 | 18 | DNS | 8 | 13 | 16 | NE | 55 |
| 31 | (France) Mathieu Faivre | 7 | 8 | 8 | 11 | DNF2 | 14 | ⑲ | DNQ | 5 | DNQ | NE | 53 |
| 32 | (Switzerland) Justin Murisier | DNS | DNF2 | 29 | DNF2 | DNF1 | DNQ | DNS | 13 | 4 | 4 | NE | 50 |
| 33 | (Slovenia) Stefan Hadalin | 29 | DNQ | DNF1 | DNQ | DNQ | DNQ | DNS | DNS | 14 | DNF1 | NE | 43 |
| 34 | (Canada) Trevor Philp | 16 | 5 | 2 | DNQ | 14 | DNQ | DNS | | | | NE | 37 |
| 35 | (Switzerland) Livio Simonet | 6 | 12 | 9 | DNF1 | DNQ | 9 | DNS | DNQ | DNF1 | DNF2 | NE | 36 |
| 36 | (Austria) Roland Leitinger | DNS | 4 | 11 | DNQ | DNS | 11 | DNS | DNF1 | 7 | 2 | NE | 35 |
| 37 | (Slovakia) Adam Žampa | 8 | DNQ | 4 | 4 | DNF1 | 4 | DNS2 | DNS | DNQ | 9 | NE | 29 |
| 38 | (France) Thibaut Favrot | 26 | DNS | | | | | | | | | NE | 26 |
| 39 | (Italy) Simon Maurberger | DNQ | 20 | DNQ | DNQ | DNQ | DNQ | DNS | 5 | DNF1 | DNS | NE | 25 |
| 40 | (Switzerland) Semyel Bissig | DNQ | 6 | DNQ | DNQ | DNF1 | 5 | DNS | DNQ | 9 | DNQ | NE | 20 |
| | (United States) Brian McLaughlin | DNS | 12 | DNQ | DNQ | DNF1 | 8 | ⑳ | DNQ | DNQ | DNF1 | NE | 20 |
| | (Switzerland) Daniel Sette | DNQ | DNF1 | DNQ | 12 | 8 | DNQ | DNS | DNQ | DNF2 | DNQ | NE | 20 |
| 43 | (Switzerland) Fadri Janutin | DNQ | 14 | DNQ | DNQ | 5 | DNQ | DNS | DNQ | DNQ | DSQ1 | NE | 19 |
| 44 | (Sweden) Mattias Rönngren | DNS | | DNQ | DNQ | DNQ | DNQ | ㉑ | 4 | 3 | 11 | NE | 18 |
| 45 | (Germany) Stefan Luitz | DNQ | DNS | 3 | DNQ | 11 | 3 | DNS | DNQ | DNF1 | DNS | NE | 17 |
| 46 | (Germany) Anton Grammel | DNQ | DNQ | DNQ | 10 | 6 | DNQ | DNS | DNQ | DNF1 | DNQ | NE | 16 |
| 47 | (France) Léo Anguenot | DNS | | DNQ | DNQ | 15 | DNQ | ㉔ | DNQ | DNS | | NE | 15 |
| | (United States) George Steffey | DNS | DNF1 | DNQ | DNQ | DNS | | | 10 | DNQ | 5 | NE | 15 |
| 49 | (Norway) Fabian Wilkens Solheim | DNQ | DNF1 | 12 | DNQ | DNF1 | DNQ | DNS | DNQ | DNQ | DNF1 | NE | 12 |
| 50 | (Canada) Asher Jordan | DNQ | DNF1 | DNS | | DNF1 | DNQ | DNS | DNS | 11 | DNF1 | NE | 11 |
| 51 | (Germany) Fabian Gratz | DNQ | DNF1 | DNQ | 7 | DNF1 | DNQ | DNF2 | DNF1 | 2 | DNF1 | NE | 9 |
| 52 | (Italy) Tobias Kastlunger | DNS | DNQ | DNF1 | DNQ | DNF1 | DNQ | DNS | DNQ | DNQ | 8 | NE | 8 |
| 53 | (Finland) Samu Torsti | DNS | DNF1 | DNQ | DNS | 7 | DNQ | DNF2 | DNQ | DNQ | DNF1 | NE | 7 |
| 54 | (Denmark) Christian Borgnæs | DNQ | DNQ | DNQ | DNQ | DNQ | DNQ | ㉘ | DNQ | DNQ | 6 | NE | 6 |
| | (Canada) James Crawford | DNS | | 6 | DNQ | DNS | | | | DNQ | DNS | NE | 6 |
| | (France) Cyprien Sarrazin | DNQ | DNQ | DNQ | 6 | DNF1 | DNS | | | | | NE | 6 |
| | (Italy) Alex Vinatzer | DNS | | DNQ | DNF1 | DNS | DNQ | DNF2 | 6 | DNQ | DNQ | NE | 6 |
| 58 | (Austria) Vincent Kriechmayr | 4 | DNS | | | | | | | | | 0 | 4 |
| | References | | | | | | | | | | | | |

=== Legend ===
- Winner (100 points)
- 2nd place (80 points)
- 3rd place (60 points)
- DNQ = Did not qualify for run 2
- DNF1 = Did not finish run 1
- DSQ1 = Disqualified run 1
- DNF2 = Did not finish run 2
- DSQ2 = Disqualified run 2
- DNS2 = Did not start run 2
- Did not start (DNS)
- Not eligible for finals (NE)
- Race canceled (x)
- FIS non-World Cup race (World Championships)

Updated at 18 March 2023 after all events.

== See also ==
- 2023 Alpine Skiing World Cup – Men's summary rankings
- 2023 Alpine Skiing World Cup – Men's overall
- 2023 Alpine Skiing World Cup – Men's downhill
- 2023 Alpine Skiing World Cup – Men's super-G
- 2023 Alpine Skiing World Cup – Men's slalom
- World Cup scoring system
