= 2023 Alpine Skiing World Cup – Men's slalom =

Alpine ski discipline year standings

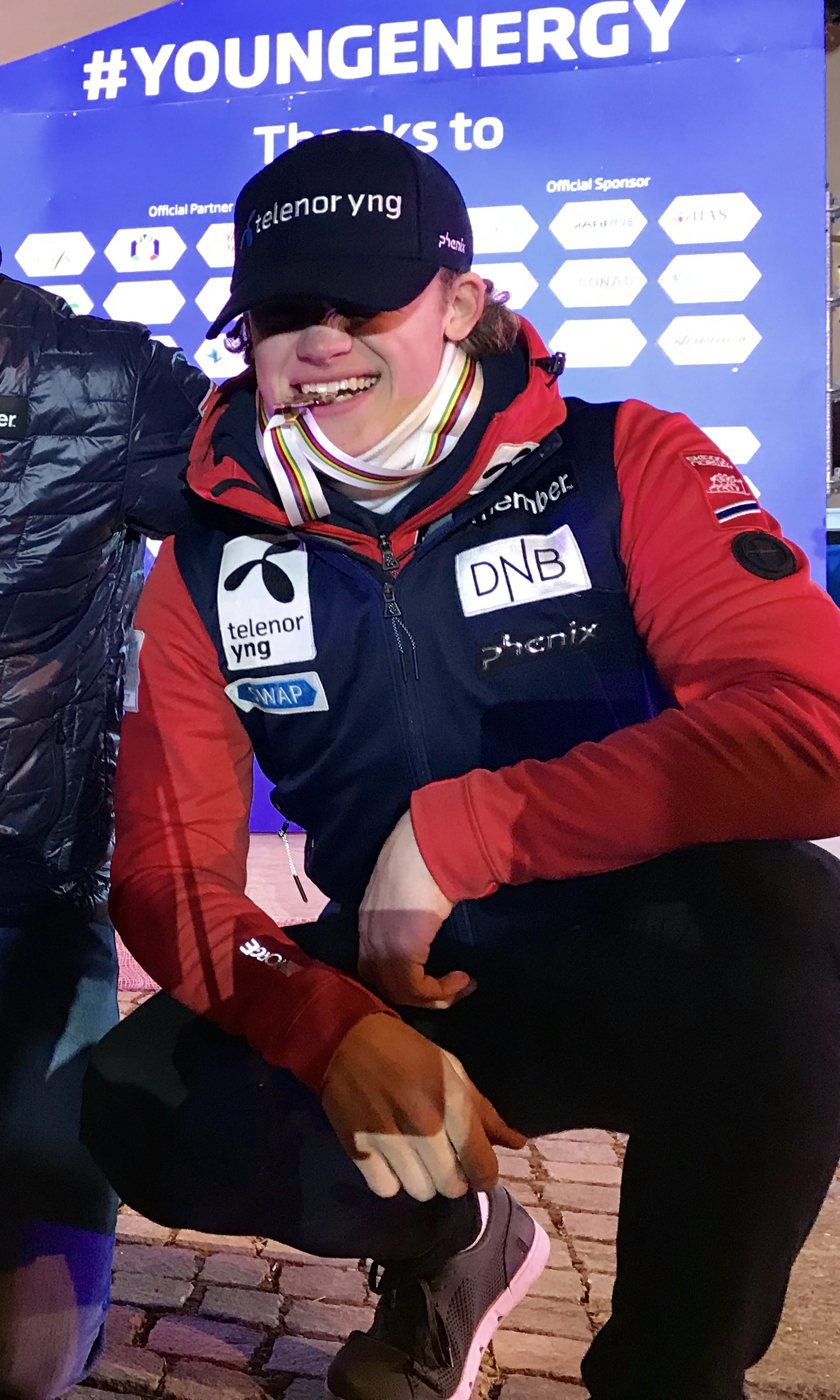
2023 Men's slalom World Cup: Lucas Braathen of Norway, season champion; 2023 Men's World Cup; Overall • Downhill • Super-G; Giant slalom • Slalom
Previous: 2022	Next: 2024

The men's slalom in the 2023 FIS Alpine Skiing World Cup consisted of ten events, including the discipline final.

The season was interrupted by the 2023 World Ski Championships in the linked resorts of Courchevel and Méribel, France from 6–19 February 2023. Although the Alpine skiing branch of the International Ski Federation (FIS) conducts both the World Cup and the World Championships, the World Championships are organized by nation (a maximum of four skiers is generally permitted per nation), and (after 1970) the results count only for World Championship medals, not for World Cup points. Accordingly, the results in the World Championship are highlighted in blue and shown in this table by ordinal position only in each discipline. The men's slalom was held in Courchevel on 19 February.

== Season summary ==
Through six races, Lucas Braathen of Norway held a narrow lead over countryman and defending champion Henrik Kristoffersen and Swiss ace Daniel Yule, with each having won twice. In the seventh race, Braathen widened his lead by being the only member of that trio to reach the podium. However, just a few days later, Braathen learned that he had an appendix infection and needed immediate surgery, which forced him to miss the next slalom at Chamonix and potentially the 2023 World Championships, with his return still uncertain post-surgery.

Braathen did return, although Kristoffersen won the World Championships in slalom with Braathen seventh. Coming into the finals, Braathen was still 32 points ahead of Kristoffersen, meaning that he was assured of the discipline title if he finished no worse than second in the final. And finishing second was exactly what he did, with Kristoffersen finishing just behind in third, which gave Braathen the season title. Switzerland's Ramon Zenhäusern won the last race (by 0.06 seconds) to complete the race podium and thus placed third for the season ahead of his countryman Yule, who failed to finish.

The World Cup discipline finals took place on Sunday, 19 March 2023, in Soldeu, Andorra. Only the top 25 in the slalom discipline ranking and the winner of the Junior World Championship were eligible to compete in the final, except that all skiers who have scored at least 500 points in the overall classification were able to compete in any discipline (but none did in slalom). Only the top 15 finishers in each discipline final scored points.

== Standings ==
	Venue	11 Dec 2022; Val d'Isère	22 Dec 2022; Madonna di Campiglio	4 Jan 2023; Garmisch-Partenkirchen	8 Jan 2023; Adelboden	15 Jan 2023; Wengen	22 Jan 2023; Kitzbühel	24 Jan 2023; Schladming	4 Feb 2023; Chamonix	19 Feb 2023; Courchevel WC	26 Feb 2023; Palisades Tahoe	19 Mar 2023; Soldeu	
#	Skier	(France)	(Italy)	(Germany)	(Switzerland)	(Switzerland)	(Austria)	(Austria)	(France)	(France)	(United States)	(Andorra)	Total
	(Norway) Lucas Braathen	100	50	DSQ1	100	60	60	60	DNS	⑦	36	80	546
2	(Norway) Henrik Kristoffersen	40	80	100	DNQ	100	45	24	DNF2	①	45	60	494
3	(Switzerland) Ramon Zenhäusern	18	10	22	32	29	36	80	100	⑨	40	100	467
4	(Switzerland) Daniel Yule	36	100	50	24	24	100	DNF2	60	㉔	7	DNF2	401
5	(Austria) Manuel Feller	80	45	80	36	DNF1	DNF2	50	18	⑦	20	16	345
6	(Switzerland) Loïc Meillard	60	DNF2	32	50	80	40	45	DNF2	DNF1	10	20	337
7	(Germany) Linus Straßer	20	60	DNF2	60	50	50	DNF1	40	⑨	26	0	306
8	(France) Clément Noël	DNF1	DNF2	60	DNF1	40	32	100	DNF2	④	60	DNF1	292
9	(Norway) Alexander Steen Olsen	12	DNF1	26	DNQ	18	22	32	29	㉒	100	36	275
10	(Norway) Timon Haugan	32	18	15	13	DNF1	7	26	11	⑰	80	29	231
11	(Norway) Atle Lie McGrath	DNF1	DNQ	DSQ1	80	45	DNF1	40	50	DNS			215
12	(Italy) Tommaso Sala	15	20	40	16	32	20	0	24	㉓	29	18	214
13	(Austria) Marco Schwarz	29	40	8	40	36	DNQ	6	DNQ	⑥	16	24	199
14	(Austria) Fabio Gstrein	22	32	29	DNF2	DNF1	26	29	20	⑯	32	DNF2	190
15	(Bulgaria) Albert Popov	24	26	10	16	DNQ	24	DNF1	DNF2	DNF1	60	22	182
16	(United Kingdom) Dave Ryding	9	22	11	12	10	80	22	DNF2	⑬	15	DNF2	181
17	(France) Alexis Pinturault	45	18	20	26	20	DNQ	DNQ	DNS	⑳	22	26	177
18	(Italy) Alex Vinatzer	DNF2	DNF1	DNF1	50	26	DNF1	0	32	③	3	45	156
19	(Sweden) Kristoffer Jakobsen	50	36	DNF2	DNF1	DNF2	11	36	DNF1	DNF1	18	0	151
20	(Switzerland) Marc Rochat	DNF1	DNF2	36	29	14	DNQ	7	14	⑭	DNF1	50	150
21	(Norway) Sebastian Foss-Solevåg	DNF2	15	DNF2	DNF1	DNF1	20	20	45	⑲	12	32	144
	(Austria) Adrian Pertl	6	29	DNF2	22	8	29	DNF2	10	⑫	DNF2	40	144
23	(Greece) AJ Ginnis	DSQ2	DNF1	DNQ	11	DNF1	DNQ	DNF1	80	②	DSQ2	0	91
	(Italy) Stefano Gross	9	DNQ	45	16	DNF1	5	11	DNQ	⑱	5	0	91
	(Croatia) Samuel Kolega	5	DNQ	13	10	DNQ	DNF1	10	29	㉞	24	DNF1	91
26	(Switzerland) Luca Aerni	DNF1	24	9	9	6	DNQ	14	15	DNS	DNQ	NE	77
27	(Croatia) Filip Zubčić	DNF1	13	16	DNQ	12	6	DNF1	18	⑪	11	NE	76
28	(Austria) Michael Matt	DNQ	14	15	8	16	12	DNQ	DNQ	DNS	7	NE	72
29	(Canada) Erik Read	10	9	18	DNF2	9	9	13	DNQ	㉛	DNQ	NE	68
30	(Germany) Sebastian Holzmann	7	11	DNQ	DNQ	13	13	13	DNQ	⑤	8	NE	65
31	(United States) Luke Winters	DNF1	DNF1	24	DNF1	7	DNF1	DNQ	22	㉚	DNQ	NE	53
32	(Austria) Johannes Strolz	DNF1	DNF2	DNF1	DNF2	22	DNF1	15	DNF2	DNS	14	NE	51
33	(Belgium) Armand Marchant	14	DNQ	DSQ1	DNQ	DNQ	14	18	DNQ	㉕	DNQ	NE	46
34	(Germany) Anton Tremmel	11	8	DNQ	20	DNF1	DNS					NE	39
35	(Spain) Joaquim Salarich	DNQ	DNQ	7	DNQ	DNQ	15	16	DNQ	DNF2	DNQ	NE	38
36	(United States) Jett Seymour	DNQ	DNQ	DNQ	DNQ	DNQ	DNF1	DNQ	36	DNF1	DNF1	NE	36
37	(Switzerland) Sandro Simonet	DNQ	DNQ	DNQ	DNQ	15	16	DNQ	DNQ	DNS	DNF1	NE	31
38	(United Kingdom) Billy Major	DNF1	7	DNQ	DNQ	DNF1	8	DNF1	DNQ	㉘	13	NE	28
39	(Italy) Tobias Kastlunger	26	DNQ	DNQ	DNF1	DNF1	DNF1	DNQ	DNQ	⑮	DNQ	NE	26
40	(Croatia) Istok Rodeš	16	DNQ	DNF1	DNF1	DNF1	DNQ	DNF1	DNQ	DNF2	9	NE	25
41	(Italy) Giuliano Razzoli	DNS	13	DNF1	6	5	DNS					NE	24
42	(Italy) Simon Maurberger	DNF1	DNQ	DNQ	DNQ	11	0	DNQ	12	DNS	DNQ	NE	23
43	(Slovenia) Stefan Hadalin	DNQ	DNF1	DNQ	18	4	DNQ	DNQ	DNQ	DNS		NE	22
44	(Austria) Dominik Raschner	DNQ	DNF1	DNQ	7	DNF1	10	DNF1	DNQ	DNS	DNQ	NE	17
45	(United Kingdom) Laurie Taylor	DNF1	6	DNQ	DNQ	DNQ	DNQ	DNF1	8	㉝	DNF1	NE	14
46	(Spain) Juan del Campo	DNQ	DNQ	DNQ	DNQ	DNF1	DNF1	9	DNQ	㉑	4	NE	13
	(Belgium) Sam Maes	DNF1	DNQ	DNS	DNF1	0	0	DNQ	13	DNF1	DNQ	NE	13
	(France) Victor Muffat-Jeandet	13	DNQ	0	DNS							NE	13
	(United States) Benjamin Ritchie	DNQ	DNF1	DNF1	5	DNF2	DNQ	8	DNQ	㉜	DNF1	NE	13
50	(Switzerland) Tanguy Nef	DNF2	DNF1	12	DNF2	DNF1	DNF2	DNF2	DNQ	DNS	DNQ	NE	12
51	(Germany) David Ketterer	DNF1	DNQ	DNQ	DNQ	DNQ	DNQ	DSQ1	9	DNS	DNQ	NE	9
52	(Japan) Yohei Koyama	DNF1	DNQ	6	DNQ	DNF1	DNQ	DNF1	DNF1	㊲	DNS	NE	6
53	(Switzerland) Noel von Grünigen	DNQ	5	DNF1	DNQ	DNF1	DNQ	DNQ	DNF1	DNS	DNF1	NE	5
	References												

=== Legend ===
- Winner (100 points)
- 2nd place (80 points)
- 3rd place (60 points)
- DNQ = Did not qualify for run 2
- DNF1 = Did not finish run 1
- DSQ1 = Disqualified run 1
- DNF2 = Did not finish run 2
- DSQ2 = Disqualified run 2
- DNS2 = Did not start run 2
- Did not start (DNS)
- Not eligible for finals (NE)
- Race canceled (x)
- FIS non-World Cup race (World Championships)
- Updated at 19 March 2023, after all events.

== See also ==
- 2023 Alpine Skiing World Cup – Men's summary rankings
- 2023 Alpine Skiing World Cup – Men's overall
- 2023 Alpine Skiing World Cup – Men's downhill
- 2023 Alpine Skiing World Cup – Men's super-G
- 2023 Alpine Skiing World Cup – Men's giant slalom
- World Cup scoring system
