= 2019 Alpine Skiing World Cup – Men's giant slalom =

Alpine ski discipline year standings

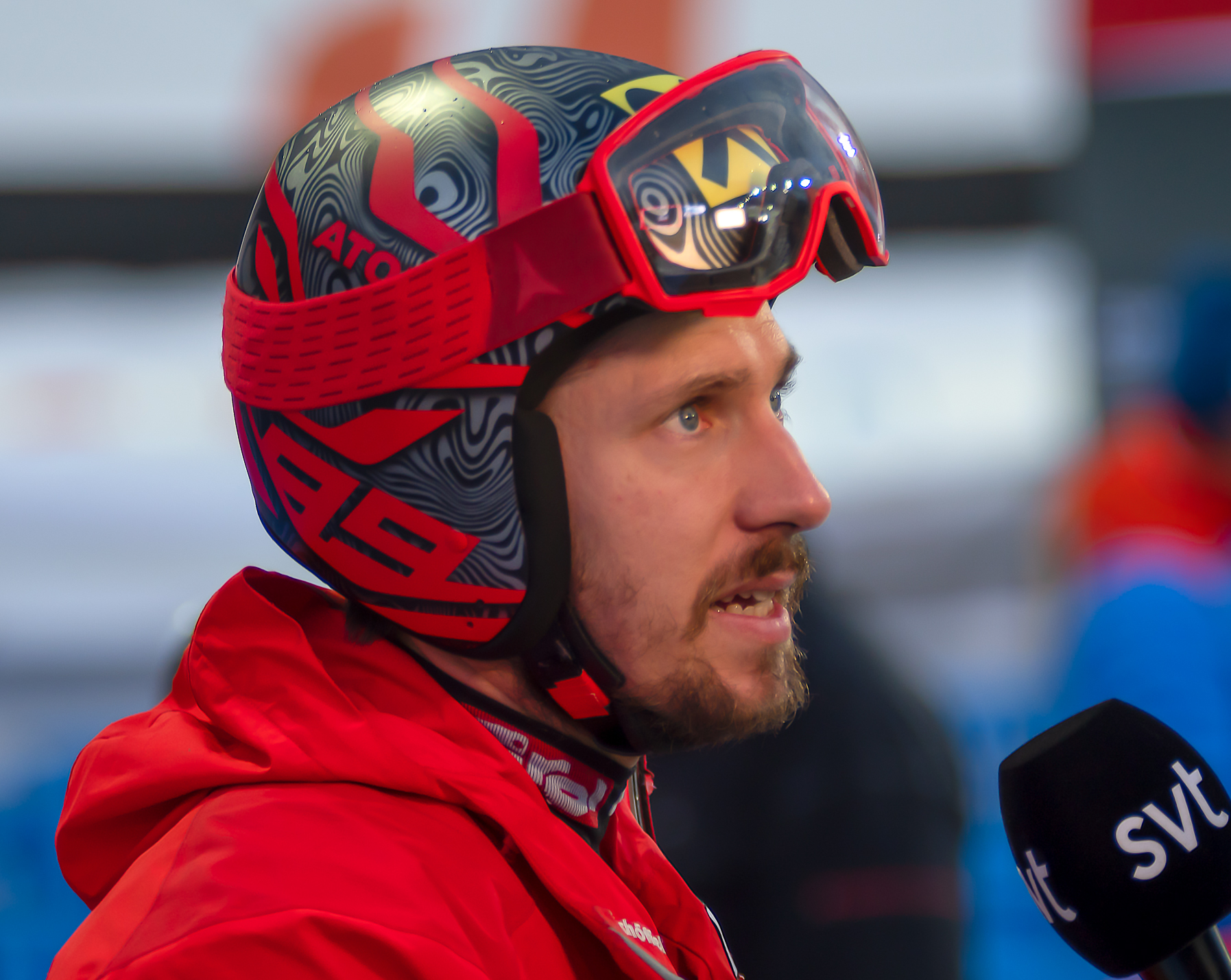
2019 Men's Giant slalom World Cup: Marcel Hirscher of Austria, season champion; 2019 Men's World Cup; Overall • downhill • super-G; giant slalom • slalom • combined
Previous: 2018	Next: 2020

The men's giant slalom in the 2019 FIS Alpine Skiing World Cup involved nine events, including a parallel giant slalom. After this season, all parallel races were moved into a separate discipline. Marcel Hirscher of Austria won three of the first four races this season and easily won the discipline for the fifth straight season, his sixth total win in this discipline, on his way to his eighth straight overall World Cup championship.

The season was interrupted by the 2019 World Ski Championships, which were held from 4–17 February in Åre, Sweden. The men's giant slalom was held on 15 February.

== Standings ==
Parallel giant slalom (PG)

#	Skier	2 Dec 2018; Beaver Creek (United States)	8 Dec 2018; Val d'Isère (France)	16 Dec 2018; Alta Badia (Italy)	17 Dec 2018; Alta Badia (PG) (Italy)	19 Dec 2018; Saalbach-Hinterglemm (Austria)	12 Jan 2019; Adelboden (Switzerland)	24 Feb 2019; Bansko (Bulgaria)	9 Mar 2019; Kranjska Gora (Slovenia)	16 Mar 2019; Soldeu (Andorra)	Total
	(Austria) Marcel Hirscher	80	100	100	100	40	100	80	40	40	680
2	(Norway) Henrik Kristoffersen	50	80	18	32	32	80	100	100	24	516
3	(France) Alexis Pinturault	18	50	60	60	36	50	50	45	100	469
4	(Slovenia) Žan Kranjec	5	29	29	2	100	45	45	29	60	364
5	(Switzerland) Loïc Meillard	45	45	32	9	80	18	22	36	26	313
6	(Sweden) Matts Olsson	40	60	40	50	DNF2	22	40	24	20	296
7	(France) Thomas Fanara	10	13	80	6	45	60	60	15	DNF1	289
8	(Switzerland) Marco Odermatt	4	36	DNF2	7	DSQ1	26	32	60	80	245
9	(France) Mathieu Faivre	36	26	20	18	60	14	20	DNF2	45	239
10	(United States) Tommy Ford	16	40	45	15	18	40	29	18	0	221
11	(Germany) Stefan Luitz	100	1	11	45	50	DNF2	DNS			207
12	(France) Victor Muffat-Jeandet	26	18	29	10	20	32	16	14	29	194
13	(Norway) Leif Kristian Nestvold-Haugen	22	12	22	26	26	24	26	DNF2	16	174
14	(Austria) Manuel Feller	DNF1	24	50	8	DNF2	DNF1	12	26	50	170
	(Italy) Luca De Aliprandini	DNQ	15	36	20	29	20	14	DNQ	36	170
16	(Norway) Rasmus Windingstad	24	DNF1	6	DNS	12	DNF1	36	80	0	158
17	(Switzerland) Gino Caviezel	20	8	16	40	22	29	8	5	0	148
18	(Switzerland) Thomas Tumler	60	DNF1	29	24	8	DNF1	3	DNS		124
19	(France) Thibaut Favrot	DNQ	DNQ	13	80	DNF1	DNQ	DNQ	DNQ	18	111
	(United States) Ted Ligety	32	6	DNF1	DNQ	16	15	2	8	32	111
21	(Italy) Manfred Mölgg	15	14	10	16	24	7	10	7	DNF1	103
22	(Italy) Riccardo Tonetti	32	32	DNQ	11	DNF2	6	18	DNS		99
23	(Switzerland) Cédric Noger	DNS		DNQ	DNS	13	DNQ	11	50	22	96
24	(Germany) Alexander Schmid	14	16	DNQ	DNS	DNF2	DNQ	24	16	DNF1	70
25	(Canada) Trevor Philp	DNQ	DNQ	12	DNS	DNQ	10	14	32	0	68
	References										

- Winner
- 2nd place
- 3rd place
- DNS = Did not start
- DNF1 = Did not finish run 1
- DSQ1 = Disqualified run 1
- DNQ = Did not qualify for run 2
- DNF2 = Did not finish run 2
- DSQ2 = Disqualified run 2

Updated at 18 March 2019 after all events.

== See also ==
- 2019 Alpine Skiing World Cup – Men's summary rankings
- 2019 Alpine Skiing World Cup – Men's overall
- 2019 Alpine Skiing World Cup – Men's downhill
- 2019 Alpine Skiing World Cup – Men's super-G
- 2019 Alpine Skiing World Cup – Men's slalom
- 2019 Alpine Skiing World Cup – Men's combined
- World Cup scoring system
