= 2019 Alpine Skiing World Cup – Men's overall =

Alpine ski discipline year standings

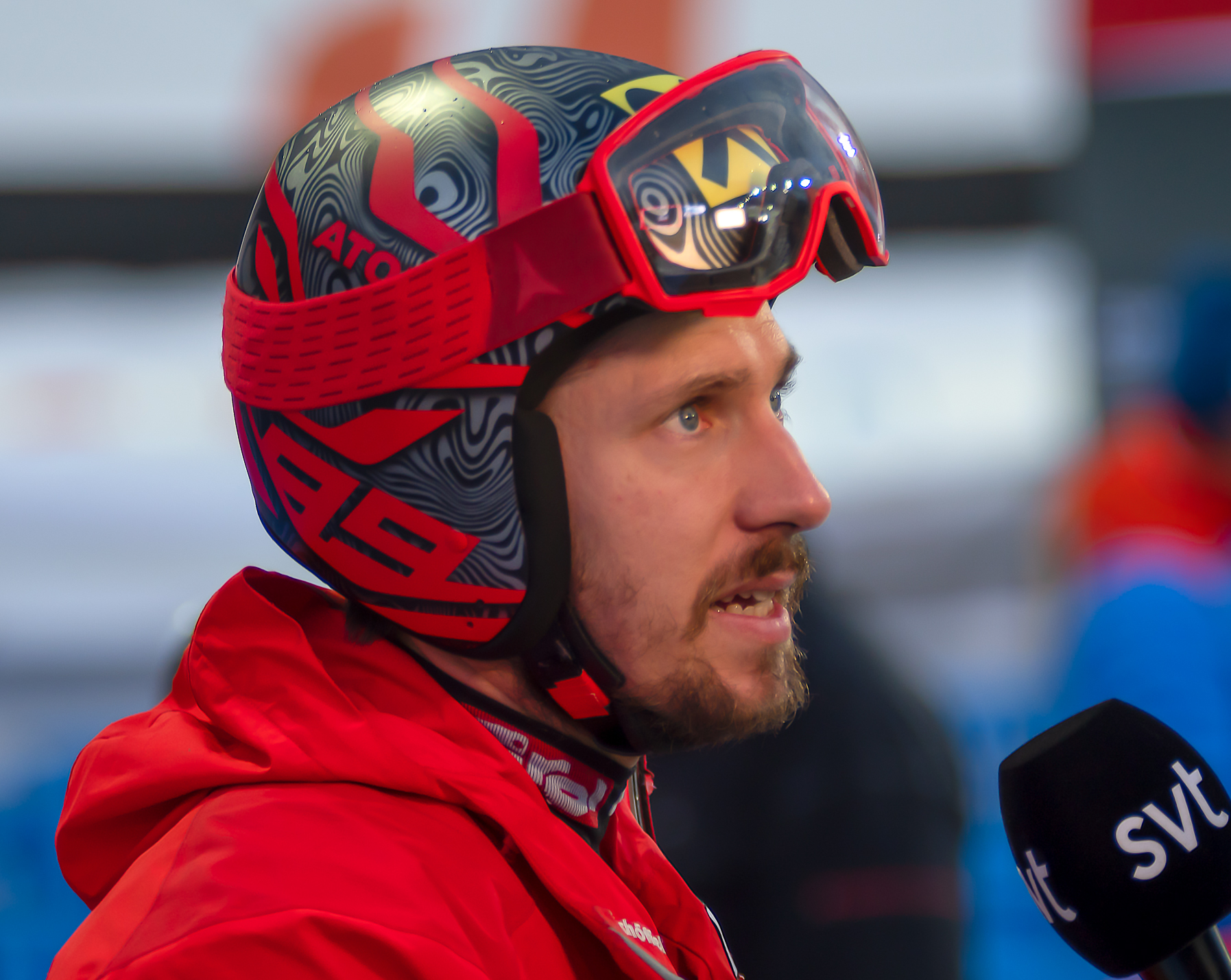
2019 men's overall World Cup: Marcel Hirscher of Austria, season champion; 2019 men's World Cup; Overall • downhill • super-g; giant slalom • slalom • combined
Previous: 2018	Next: 2020

The men's overall in the 2019 FIS Alpine Skiing World Cup involved 38 events in 5 disciplines: downhill (DH), Super-G (SG), giant slalom (GS), slalom (SL), and Alpine combined (AC). Marcel Hirscher of Austria won the overall title for the eighth consecutive time, setting the all-time record, as no one prior had ever won more than six total. After the season, Hirscher retired.

The season was interrupted by the 2019 World Ski Championships, which were held from 4–17 February in Åre, Sweden.

== Standings ==
#	Skier	DH; 8 races	SG; 7 races	GS; 9 races	SL; 12 races	AC; 2 races	Total
	(Austria) Marcel Hirscher	0	0	680	786	80	1,546
2	(France) Alexis Pinturault	0	63	469	453	160	1,145
3	(Norway) Henrik Kristoffersen	0	0	516	516	15	1,047
4	(Italy) Dominik Paris	520	430	0	0	0	950
5	(Austria) Vincent Kriechmayr	339	346	1	0	53	739
6	(Switzerland) Beat Feuz	540	182	0	0	0	722
7	(Switzerland) Mauro Caviezel	282	324	0	0	90	696
8	(Norway) Aleksander Aamodt Kilde	284	299	50	0	18	651
9	(Austria) Marco Schwarz	0	0	49	411	100	560
10	(Austria) Manuel Feller	0	0	170	388	0	558
11	(France) Clément Noël	0	0	0	551	0	551
	(Switzerland) Daniel Yule	0	0	0	551	0	551
13	(Norway) Kjetil Jansrud	160	316	25	0	36	537
14	(Switzerland) Ramon Zenhäusern	0	0	0	521	0	521
15	(Switzerland) Loïc Meillard	0	0	313	163	26	502
16	(Italy) Christof Innerhofer	276	191	0	0	34	501
17	(Austria) Matthias Mayer	197	295	4	0	0	496
18	(France) Victor Muffat-Jeandet	0	13	194	194	80	481
19	(France) Johan Clarey	234	200	0	0	0	434
20	(Norway) Aksel Lund Svindal	200	219	0	0	0	419
21	(Austria) Max Franz	222	185	1	0	0	408
22	(Slovenia) Žan Kranjec	0	0	344	55	0	399
23	(Germany) Josef Ferstl	156	197	0	0	0	353
24	(Switzerland) Marco Odermatt	7	72	245	0	10	334
	(United Kingdom) Dave Ryding	0	0	0	334	0	334

- Leader
- 2nd place
- 3rd place
- Updated at 18 March 2019, after all events

== See also ==
- 2019 Alpine Skiing World Cup – Men's summary rankings
- 2019 Alpine Skiing World Cup – Men's downhill
- 2019 Alpine Skiing World Cup – Men's super-G
- 2019 Alpine Skiing World Cup – Men's giant slalom
- 2019 Alpine Skiing World Cup – Men's slalom
- 2019 Alpine Skiing World Cup – Men's combined
- 2019 Alpine Skiing World Cup – Women's overall
