= 2019 Alpine Skiing World Cup – Men's slalom =

Alpine Ski discipline year standings

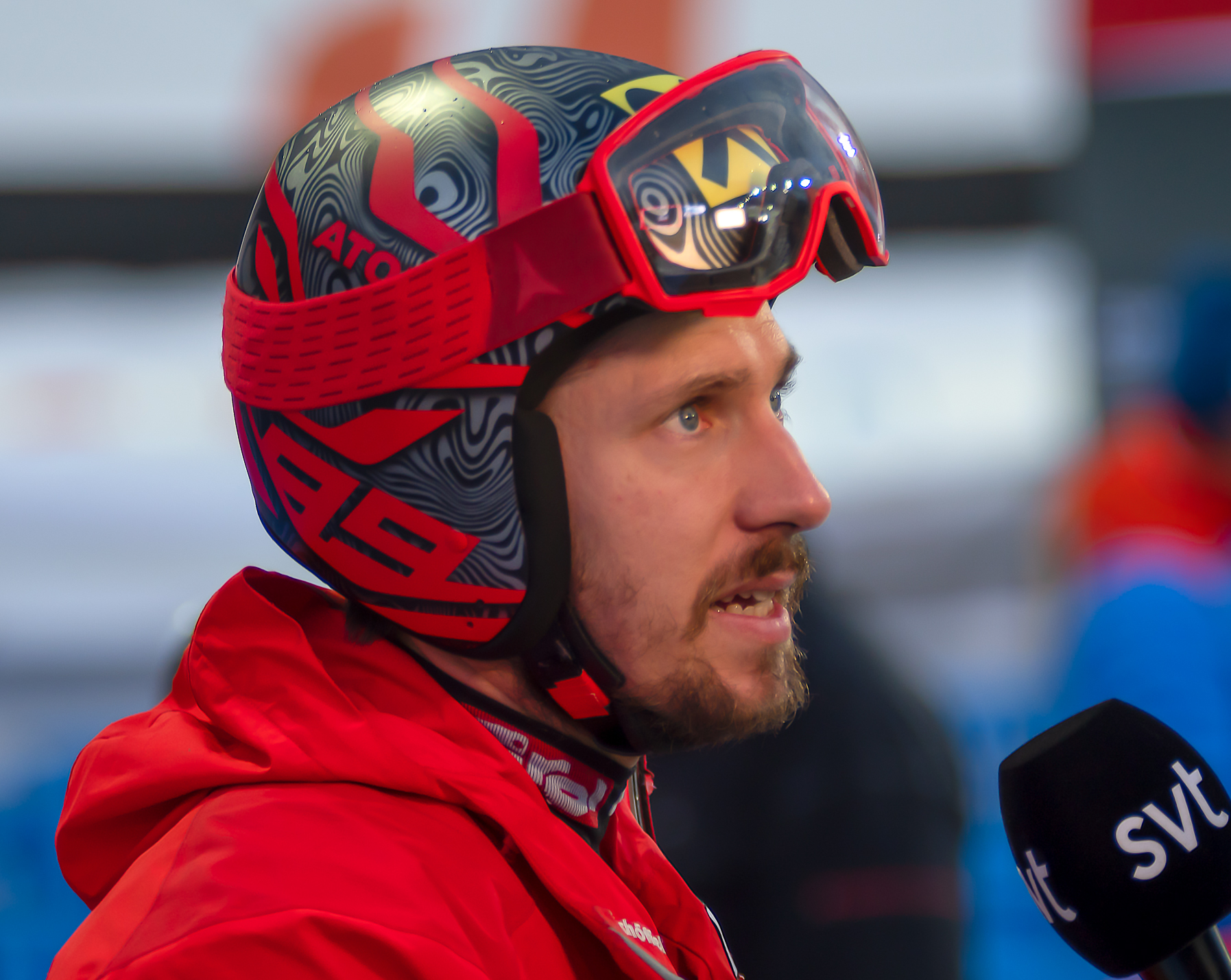
2019 Men's slalom World Cup: Marcel Hirscher of Austria, season champion; 2019 Men's World Cup; Overall • Downhill • Super-G; Giant slalom • Slalom • Combined
Previous: 2018	Next: 2020

The men's slalom in the 2019 FIS Alpine Skiing World Cup involved 12 events, including two parallel slaloms (both city events}. Marcel Hirscher of Austria won his sixth championship in the discipline, all in the prior seven years, on the way to his eighth straight overall men's championship. During the season, Hirscher had hinted at retiring after it, and before the start of the next season, he did announce his retirement.

The season was interrupted by the 2019 World Ski Championships, which were held from 4–17 February in Åre, Sweden. The men's slalom was held on 17 February.

== Standings ==
Parallel slalom (PS) or City Event (CE)

#	Skier	18 Nov 2018; Levi (Finland)	20 Dec 2018; Saalbach-Hinterglemm (Austria)	22 Dec 2018; Madonna di Campiglio (Italy)	01 Jan 2019; Oslo (CE) (Norway)	06 Jan 2019; Zagreb (Croatia)	13 Jan 2019; Adelboden (Switzerland)	20 Jan 2019; Wengen (Switzerland)	26 Jan 2019; Kitzbühel (Austria)	29 Jan 2019; Schladming (Austria)	19 Feb 2019; Stockholm (CE) (Sweden)	10 Mar 2019; Kranjska Gora (Slovenia)	17 Mar 2019; Soldeu (Andorra)	Total
	(Austria) Marcel Hirscher	100	100	0	36	100	100	60	80	100	32	60	18	786
2	(France) Clément Noël	0	36	6	29	50	80	100	100	DNF1	18	32	100	551
	(Switzerland) Daniel Yule	40	45	100	32	29	32	45	13	60	50	45	60	551
4	(Switzerland) Ramon Zenhäusern	50	28	DNQ	60	DNF2	45	DNF1	40	50	100	100	50	521
5	(Norway) Henrik Kristoffersen	80	60	DNF2	24	45	60	50	50	DNF2	22	80	45	516
6	(France) Alexis Pinturault	DNF1	18	29	26	80	50	6	60	80	36	36	32	453
7	(Austria) Marco Schwarz	26	29	80	100	DNF2	DNF2	26	45	45	60	DNS		411
8	(Austria) Manuel Feller	29	50	DNF1	15	60	DNF1	80	DSQ1	DNF1	24	50	80	388
9	(United Kingdom) Dave Ryding	22	8	50	80	24	DNF1	32	16	29	29	22	22	334
10	(Sweden) André Myhrer	60	22	DNQ	50	DNQ	DNF1	20	36	DNF2	80	32	DNF2	300
11	(Austria) Michael Matt	36	45	60	40	DNF1	DNQ	40	32	20	15	DNF1	0	288
12	(Italy) Manfred Mölgg	DNF1	24	40	DNS	DNF2	20	22	DNF1	22	40	40	22	230
	(Austria) Christian Hirschbühl	32	12	DNQ	20	18	10	36	26	26	26	DNF1	24	230
14	(Germany) Felix Neureuther	DNS	4	32	DNS	32	16	14	24	32	DNS	24	36	214
15	(France) Victor Muffat-Jeandet	0	11	29	22	13	36	DNQ	14	DNF2	20	20	29	194
16	(Switzerland) Loïc Meillard	18	80	12	DNS	DNF2	DNF1	24	DNF2	13	16	DNF1	0	163
17	(Norway) Sebastian Foss-Solevåg	DNF1	16	DNQ	18	49	14	0	DNF1	14	45	14	DNF2	161
18	(Italy) Giuliano Razzoli	DNS	DNF1	45	DNS	12	DNF1	16	18	DNQ	DNS	DNF2	40	131
19	(Slovenia) Stefan Hadalin	13	32	DNQ	DNS	DNQ	26	18	22	DNF2	DNS	10	0	121
20	(Italy) Stefano Gross	14	DNF1	DSQ2	DNS	26	15	29	DNF1	DNF1	DNS	32	0	116
21	(Croatia) Istok Rodes	DNF1	DNQ	36	DNS	36	DNF2	DNF1	DNQ	DNF2	DNS	13	26	111
22	(France) Jean-Baptiste Grange	45	DNF2	20	DNS	14	29	DNF2	DNS					108
23	(Bulgaria) Albert Popov	11	DNQ	15	DNS	DNQ	DNQ	DNF1	29	40	DNS	DNF1	0	95
24	(France) Julien Lizeroux	20	20	0	DNS	DNF1	22	DNF1	11	18	DNS	DNF1	0	91
25	(Croatia) Elias Kolega	DNQ	DNQ	DNF1	DNS	11	40	13	10	DNF2	DNS	7	0	81
	(Austria) Marc Digruber	12	9	DNF1	DNS	DNF1	9	DNF1	9	36	DNS	6	0	81
	References													

- Winner
- 2nd place
- 3rd place
- DNF1 = Did not finish run 1
- DSQ1 = Disqualified run 1
- DNQ = Did not qualify for run 2
- DNF2 = Did not finish run 2
- DSQ2 = Disqualified run 2
- DNS = Did not start
- Updated at 18 March 2019, after all events.

== See also ==
- 2019 Alpine Skiing World Cup – Men's summary rankings
- 2019 Alpine Skiing World Cup – Men's overall
- 2019 Alpine Skiing World Cup – Men's downhill
- 2019 Alpine Skiing World Cup – Men's super-G
- 2019 Alpine Skiing World Cup – Men's giant slalom
- 2019 Alpine Skiing World Cup – Men's combined
- World Cup scoring system
