= Rasmus Windingstad =

Norwegian alpine skier

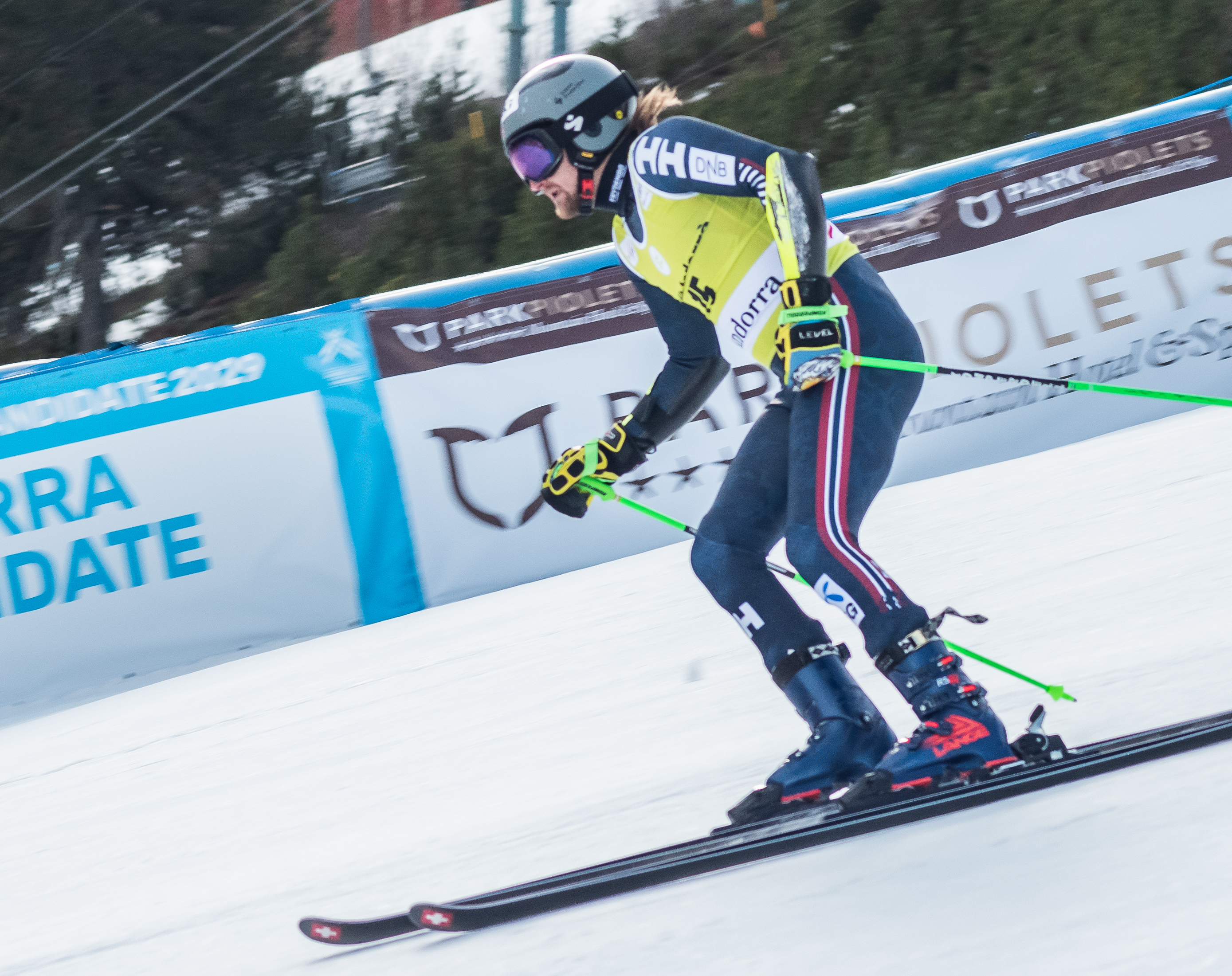
- Windinggstad skiing in 2023

Personal information
- Born: 31 October 1993 (age 32) Asker, Norway

Skiing career
- Sport: Alpine skiing
- Club: Bærums SK
- Disciplines: Giant slalom, super-G, combined
- World Cup debut: 2 February 2014 (age 20)

Olympics
- Teams: 1 – (2022)
- Medals: 0

World Championships
- Teams: 3 – (2015, 2019, 2023)
- Medals: 0

World Cup
- Seasons: 4 – (2017–2020)
- Wins: 1 – (1 PG)
- Podiums: 3 – (2 GS, 1 PG)
- Overall titles: 0 – (33rd in 2023)
- Discipline titles: 0 – (2nd in PAR, 2020)
Medal record
Men's alpine skiing
Representing Norway
Olympic Games
Bronze medal – third place	2022 Beijing	Team event
Junior World Championships
Bronze medal – third place	2014 Jasná	Giant slalom

Rasmus Windingstad (born 31 October 1993) is a Norwegian World Cup alpine ski racer.

== Sports career ==
At the Junior World Championships in 2014, he won a bronze medal in the giant slalom, was seventh in the super combined, and ninth in the slalom. Windingstad made his World Cup debut in February 2014 in St. Moritz, but did not finish the first run. Over the next year, he competed in five more World Cup races, but did not finish any of them. He gained his first World Cup podium at Kranjska Gora in March 2019.

Windingstad has competed at three World Championships, and placed thirteenth in the giant slalom and combined events in 2019.

== Personal life ==
Windingstad was born in Gjøvik on 31 October 1993. He has a Swedish mother and Norwegian father (from Gol), and represents the sports club Bærums SK.

== World Cup results ==
=== Season standings ===
Season	Age	Overall	Slalom	Giant slalom	Super-G	Downhill	Combined	Parallel
2016	22	127	—	45	—	—	—	—N/a
2017	23	153	—	53	—	—	—	—N/a
2018	24	98	—	35	44	—	—	—N/a
2019	25	36	—	16	26	—	14	—N/a
2020	26	42	—	28	42	—	—	2
2021	27	116	—	38	—	—	—N/a	—
2022	28	69	—	19	—	—	—N/a	—
2023	29	33	—	9	—	—	—N/a	—N/a
2024	30	79	—	26	—	—	—N/a	—N/a
2025	31	74	—	24	48	—	—N/a	—N/a

Standings through 30 December 2024

=== Race podiums ===
- 1 win – (1 PG)
- 3 podiums – (2 GS, 1 PG); 14 top tens

Season	Date	Location	Discipline	Place
2019	9 Mar 2019	Kranjska Gora, Slovenia	Giant slalom	2nd
2020	24 Dec 2019	Alta Badia, Italy	Parallel-G	1st
2023	25 Feb 2023	(United States) Palisades Tahoe, USA	Giant slalom	3rd

== World Championship results ==
Year	Age	Slalom	Giant slalom	Super-G	Downhill	Combined	Parallel	Team event
2015	21	—	31	—	—	—	—N/a	—
2019	25	—	13	—	—	13	—N/a	—
2023	29	—	16	—	—	—	5	—

== Olympic results ==
Year	Age	Slalom	Giant slalom	Super-G	Downhill	Combined
2022	28	—	DNF1	29	—	—
