= Tommaso Sala =

Italian alpine skier (born 1995)

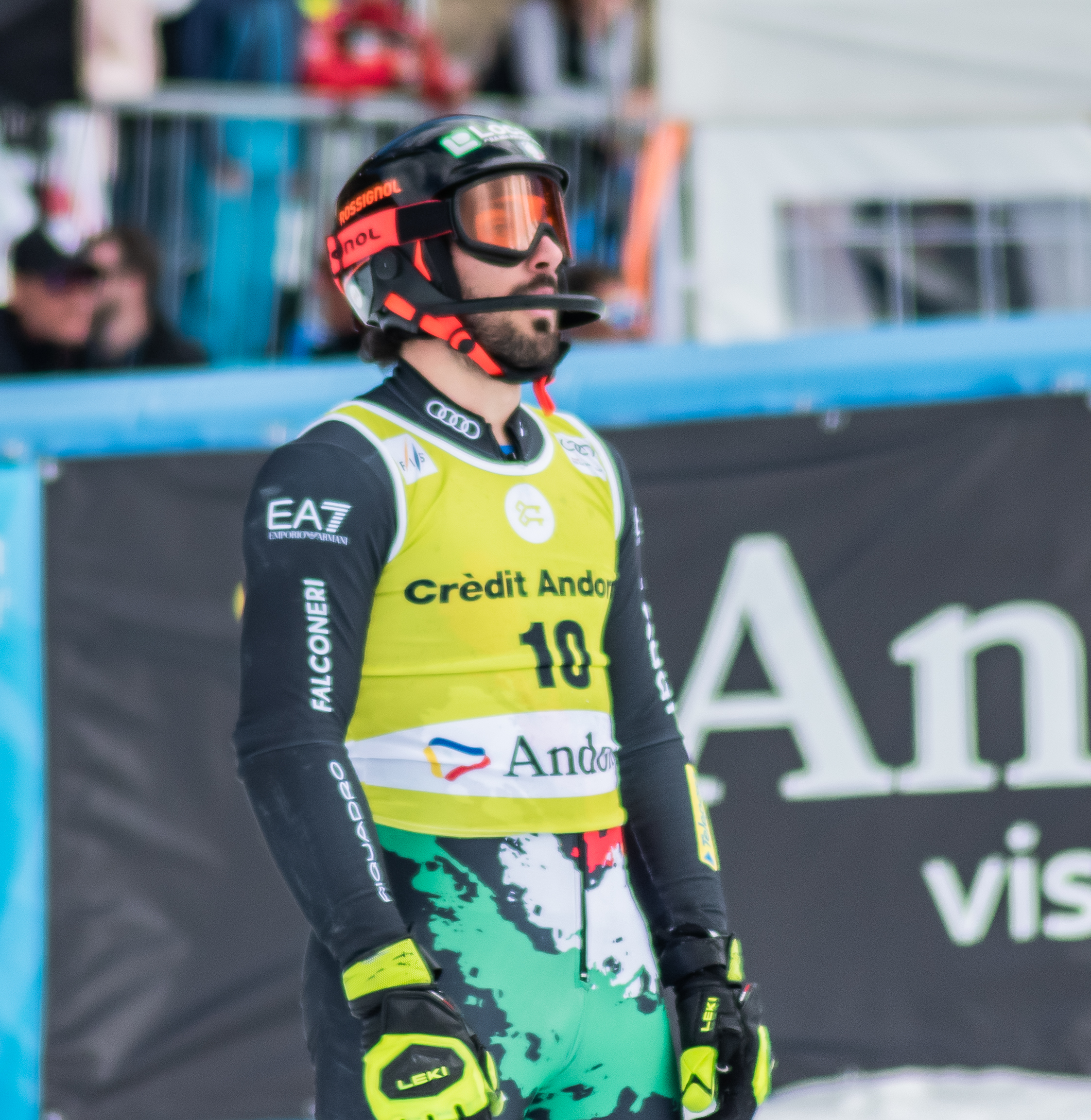
- Sala in 2023

Personal information
- Born: 6 September 1995 (age 30) Milan, Italy

Skiing career
- Country: Italy
- Sport: Alpine skiing
- Club: G.S. Fiamme Oro
- Disciplines: Slalom, giant slalom
- World Cup debut: 13 December 2015 (age 20)

Olympics
- Teams: 2 − (2022, 2026)
- Medals: 0

World Championships
- Teams: 1 − (2023)
- Medals: 0

World Cup
- Seasons: 8 – (2017–18, 2020–24, 2026)
- Podiums: 0
- Overall titles: 0 – (37th in 2023)
- Discipline titles: 0 – (12th in SL, 2023)

Tommaso Sala (born 6 September 1995) is an Italian World Cup alpine ski racer, and specializes in the technical events, with a focus on slalom.

== World Cup results ==
=== Season standings ===
Season
Season	Age	Overall	Slalom	Giant slalom	Super-G	Downhill	Combined	Parallel
2017	21	91	32	—	—	—	—	—N/a
2018	22	145	51	—	—	—	—	—N/a
2019	23	Injured; did not compete						—N/a
2020	24	118	45	—	—	—	—	—
2021	25	129	43	—	—	—	—N/a	—
2022	26	43	14	—	—	—	—N/a	—
2023	27	37	12	—	—	—	—N/a	—N/a
2024	28	52	17	—	—	—	—N/a	—N/a
2025	29	Injured; did not compete					—N/a	—N/a
2026	30	54	19	—	—	—	—N/a	—N/a

=== Top-ten results ===
- 0 podiums, 10 top tens (10 SL)

Season
Season	Date	Location	Discipline	Place
2022	22 January 2022	Kitzbühel, Austria	Slalom	6th
2022	25 January 2022	Schladming, Austria	Slalom	7th
2022	22 March 2022	Méribel, France	Slalom	7th
2023	4 January 2023	Garmisch-Partenkirchen, Germany	Slalom	6th
2023	15 January 2023	Wengen, Switzerland	Slalom	8th
2023	26 February 2023	Palisades Tahoe, United States	Slalom	9th
2024	7 January 2024	Adelboden, Switzerland	Slalom	7th
2024	21 January 2024	Kitzbühel, Austria	Slalom	9th
2024	24 January 2024	Schladming, Austria	Slalom	9th
2026	14 December 2025	Val d'Isere, France	Slalom	7th

== World Championship results ==
Year
Year	Age	Slalom	Giant slalom	Super-G	Downhill	Combined	Parallel	Team event
2023	23	23	—	—	—	—	—	—

== Olympic results ==
Year
Year	Age	Slalom	Giant slalom	Super-G	Downhill	Combined	Team combined	Team event
2022	22	11	DNF1	—	—	—	—N/a	—
2026	26	DNF1	—	—	—	—N/a	5	—N/a

== European Cup results ==
Race wins

Date	Location	Discipline
16 December 2019	Fassa Valley, Italy	Slalom
30 November 2019	Funäsdalen, Sweden	Slalom

=== National titles ===
- Italian Alpine Ski Championships
  - Slalom: 2017
  - Giant slalom: 2023
