= Marc Rochat =

Swiss alpine skier

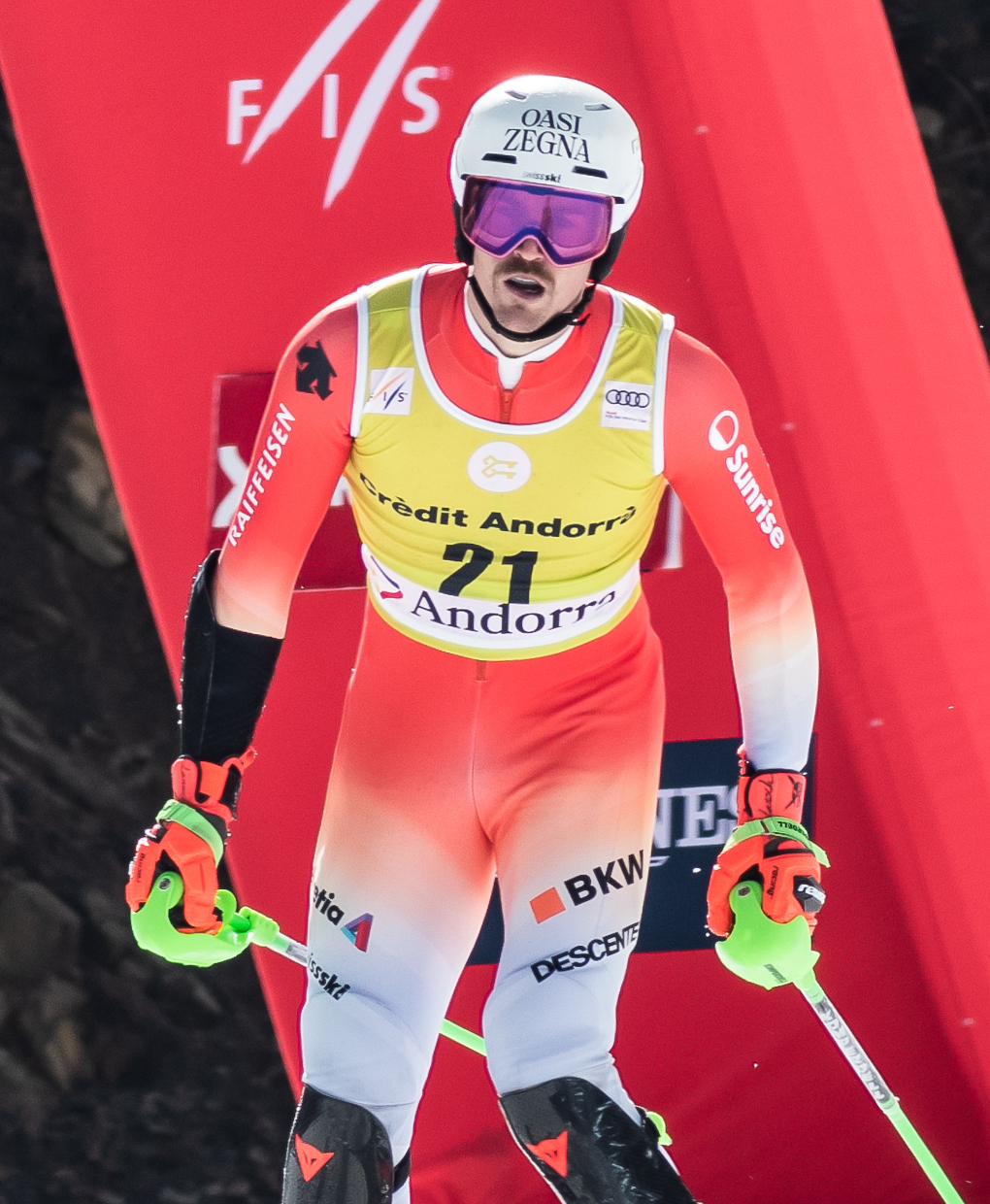
- Rochat in 2023

Personal information
- Born: 18 December 1992 (age 33) Lausanne, Vaud, Switzerland
- Height: 1.85 m (6 ft 1 in)

Skiing career
- Sport: Alpine skiing
- Club: SAS Lausanne
- Disciplines: Slalom
- World Cup debut: 13 December 2015 (age 22)

Olympics
- Teams: 0

World Championships
- Teams: 2 – (2023, 2025)
- Medals: 1 (0 gold)

World Cup
- Seasons: 8
- Podiums: 0
- Overall titles: 0 – (52nd in 2023)
- Discipline titles: 0 – (20th in SL, 2023)
Medal record
World Championships
Bronze medal – third place	2025 Saalbach	Team combined

Marc Rochat (born 18 December 1992) is a Swiss World Cup alpine ski racer and specializes in slalom.

== Career ==
During his World Cup career, Rochat has five top ten results. From Lausanne, Vaud, he competed at his first World Championships in 2023, and was fourteenth in the slalom.

== World Cup results ==
=== Season standings ===
Season	Age	Overall	Slalom	Giant slalom	Super-G	Downhill	Combined	Parallel
2016	23	153	57	—	—	—	—	—N/a
2017	24	126	48	—	—	—	—	—N/a
2018	25	85	28	—	—	—	—	—N/a
2019	26	147	55	—	—	—	—	—N/a
2020	27	112	41	—	—	—	—	—
2021	28	88	30	—	—	—	—N/a	—
2022	29	82	30	—	—	—	—N/a	—
2023	30	52	20	—	—	—	—N/a	—N/a
2024	31	33	9	—	—	—	—N/a	—N/a

Standings through 17 March 2024

=== Top ten results ===
- 0 podiums, 10 top tens (10 SL)

Season	Date	Location	Discipline	Place
2018	4 Mar 2018	Kranjska Gora, Slovenia	Slalom	6th
2022	22 Jan 2022	Kitzbühel, Austria	Slalom	8th
2023	4 Jan 2023	Garmisch-Partenkirchen, Germany	Slalom	7th
2023	8 Jan 2023	Adelboden, Switzerland	Slalom	9th
2023	19 Mar 2023	(Andorra) Soldeu, Andora	Slalom	4th
2024	7 Jan 2024	Adelboden, Switzerland	Slalom	5th
2024	14 Jan 2024	Wengen, Switzerland	Slalom	6th
2024	21 Jan 2024	Kitzbühel, Austria	Slalom	10th
2024	24 Jan 2024	Schladming, Austria	Slalom	4th
2024	17 Mar 2024	Saalbach, Austria	Slalom	6th

== World Championship results ==
Year	Age	Slalom	Giant slalom	Super-G	Downhill	Combined	Team Combined	Parallel	Team event
2023	30	14	—	—	—	—	—N/a	—	—
2025	32	16	—	—	—	—N/a	3	—N/a	—
