= AJ Ginnis =

Greek-American alpine skier (born 1994)

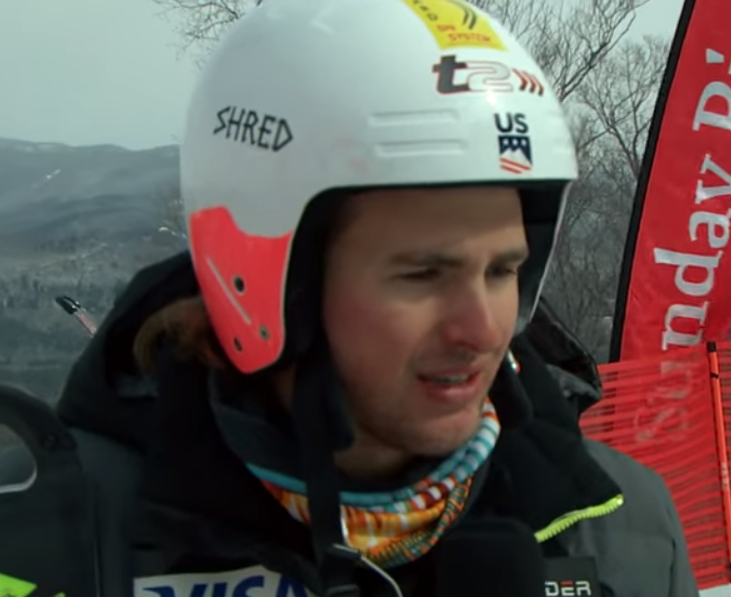
- Ginnis in 2017

Personal information
- Full name: Alexandros Ioannis Ginnis
- Born: 17 November 1994 (age 31) Athens, Greece
- Height: 1.80 m (5 ft 11 in)

Skiing career
- Country: Greece (since 2020–21); United States (until 2019–20)
- Sport: Alpine skiing
- College team: Dartmouth Big Green
- Club: Green Mountain Valley School, SXO Arachovas
- Retired: 16 February 2026 (age 31)
- Disciplines: Slalom, giant slalom
- World Cup debut: 22 December 2014 (age 20)

Olympics
- Teams: 1 – (2026)
- Medals: 0

World Championships
- Teams: 3 – (2017, 2021, 2023)
- Medals: 1 (0 gold)

World Cup
- Seasons: 10 – (2015–2018, 2020–2021, 2023–2026)
- Podiums: 1 – (1 SL)
- Overall titles: 0 – (61st in 2024)
- Discipline titles: 0 – (23rd in SL, 2023 & 2024)
Medal record
Men's alpine skiing
Representing Greece
World Championships
Silver medal – second place	2023 Courchevel	Slalom
Representing the United States
Junior World Championships
Bronze medal – third place	2015 Hafjell	Slalom

Alexandros Ioannis "AJ" Ginnis (Greek: Αλέξανδρος Ιωάννης Γκιννής; born 17 November 1994) is a retired Greek-American World Cup alpine ski racer. Ginnis specialized in the technical events, with a focus on slalom. The Greek native joined the US Ski Team in 2012 at age seventeen and moved to represent Greece in 2020. He became the most decorated winter athlete in Greek history, attaining the country's first podium at an FIS Ski World Cup event and first world championships medal in any Winter Olympic sport. His career was plagued by multiple knee injuries which ultimately forced him to end his racing career at age 31. Ginnis retired from racing after a ceremonial final run at the 2026 Winter Olympics.

== Early life ==
Born in Athens, Greece, to a Greek father and an American mother, Alexandros Ioannis Ginnis grew up in the seaside suburb of Vouliagmeni. His father ran a ski school, where he met his wife. Alexandros started skiing at age two at Mt. Parnassus. When he was twelve, he moved to Austria with his father. It was then that the young skier found that he loved ski racing and had potential to be successful. Ginnis was fifteen when his family moved to the United States, where he enrolled at the Green Mountain Valley School in Vermont.

== Career ==
At age seventeen, Ginnis was named to the US Ski Team in the spring of 2012. After tearing his ACL while training in Chile later that year, he was able to return in the fall of 2013 and made his World Cup debut on 22 December 2014 in a slalom at Madonna di Campiglio, Italy. Later that season, Ginnis won the bronze medal in the slalom at the Junior World Championships in Hafjell, Norway, and continued to climb the ranks by securing podiums and wins at Europa Cup, Nor-Am Cup, and national championship events.

On 22 December 2016, Ginnis scored his first World Cup points, finishing 26th in the slalom at Madonna di Campiglio. During that 2017 season, he qualified to represent Team USA at the World Championships in St. Moritz, Switzerland, and was part of the US team in the mixed team parallel event. In March he won the slalom title at the US Alpine Championships.

Ginnis struggled to establish himself on the World Cup tour the next season, being unable to earn any points in eight starts. In the spring of 2018, the US team cut their men's slalom program, leaving Ginnis without financial support. Another ACL tear kept him sidelined for the entire 2019 season. In the 2020 season, Ginnis raced for Dartmouth College and had an early win on the Nor-Am Cup before suffering a groin injury in December. Despite that, he was able to get another Nor-Am win and podium in February and had returned to training with the US team in Europe when the COVID-19 pandemic canceled the rest of the season.

With the US unable to assure him of a spot on the team for the upcoming 2021 season, Ginnis made the decision to ski instead for his native country of Greece. He recruited Sandy Vietze, his long-time friend and teammate, to assist with the transition and be his coach. On 17 January 2021, Ginnis became the first Greek alpine racer to win World Cup points for Greece, finishing eleventh at a slalom in Flachau, Austria. The Hellenic Olympic Committee praised him for his contribution to the sport in Greece.

Yet another knee ligament injury during training in August 2021 forced Ginnis to sit out the entire next season and the 2022 Winter Olympics.

Upon his return, Ginnis finally found success at the highest level of the sport during his breakthrough 2023 campaign. He achieved his first World Cup podium on 4 February as the runner-up in the slalom at Chamonix, France. With his second-place finish, Ginnis became the first Greek skier in history to secure a podium position in a World Cup alpine ski race. Two weeks later, at the World Championships in Courchevel, he won the silver medal in slalom – Greece's first world championships medal in any Winter Olympic sport.

In 2024 Ginnis finished in the top fifteen in five races, including a ninth-place result at his second World Cup finals in Saalbach, Austria.

A fractured osteophyte (a bone growth in the knee) and the resulting surgery needed to repair it ended Ginnis's 2025 season after just two races. Although he was "hugely disappointed," he set a goal for himself of returning for the 2026 Winter Olympics in Italy. Despite extensive efforts at rehabilitation, Ginnis managed only one start in 2025–26, and he was forced to admit that complications from his most recent surgery prevented him from racing at the elite level. On 15 February he announced on Instagram that the next day's Olympic slalom would be his final race. Event organizers allowed Ginnis a ceremonial farewell run in which he gently slid down the slope to officially become an Olympian.

== World Cup results ==
=== Season standings ===
Season
Season	Age	Overall	Slalom	Giant slalom	Super-G	Downhill	Combined
2017	22	153	59	—	—	—	—
2018	23	no World Cup points earned					
2019	24	did not compete					
2020	25	no World Cup points earned					
2021	26	113	38	—	—	—	—N/a
2022	27	did not compete					—N/a
2023	28	70	23	—	—	—	—N/a
2024	29	61	23	—	—	—	—N/a
2025	30	132	46	—	—	—	—N/a

=== Race podiums ===
- 0 wins
- 1 podium – (1 SL); 3 top tens (3 SL)

Season
Season	Date	Location	Discipline	Place
2023	4 Feb 2023	Chamonix, France	Slalom	2nd

== World Championship results ==
Year
Year	Age	Slalom	Giant slalom	Super-G	Downhill	Combined	Parallel	Team event
Representing the United States
2017	22	—	—	—	—	—	—N/a	9
Representing Greece
2021	26	DNF2	—	—	—	—	—	—
2023	28	2	—	—	—	—	—	—

== Olympic results ==
Year
Year	Age	Slalom	Giant slalom	Super-G	Downhill	Team combined
2026	31	DNF1	–	—	—	—
