= Kristoffer Jakobsen =

Swedish alpine skier (born 1994)

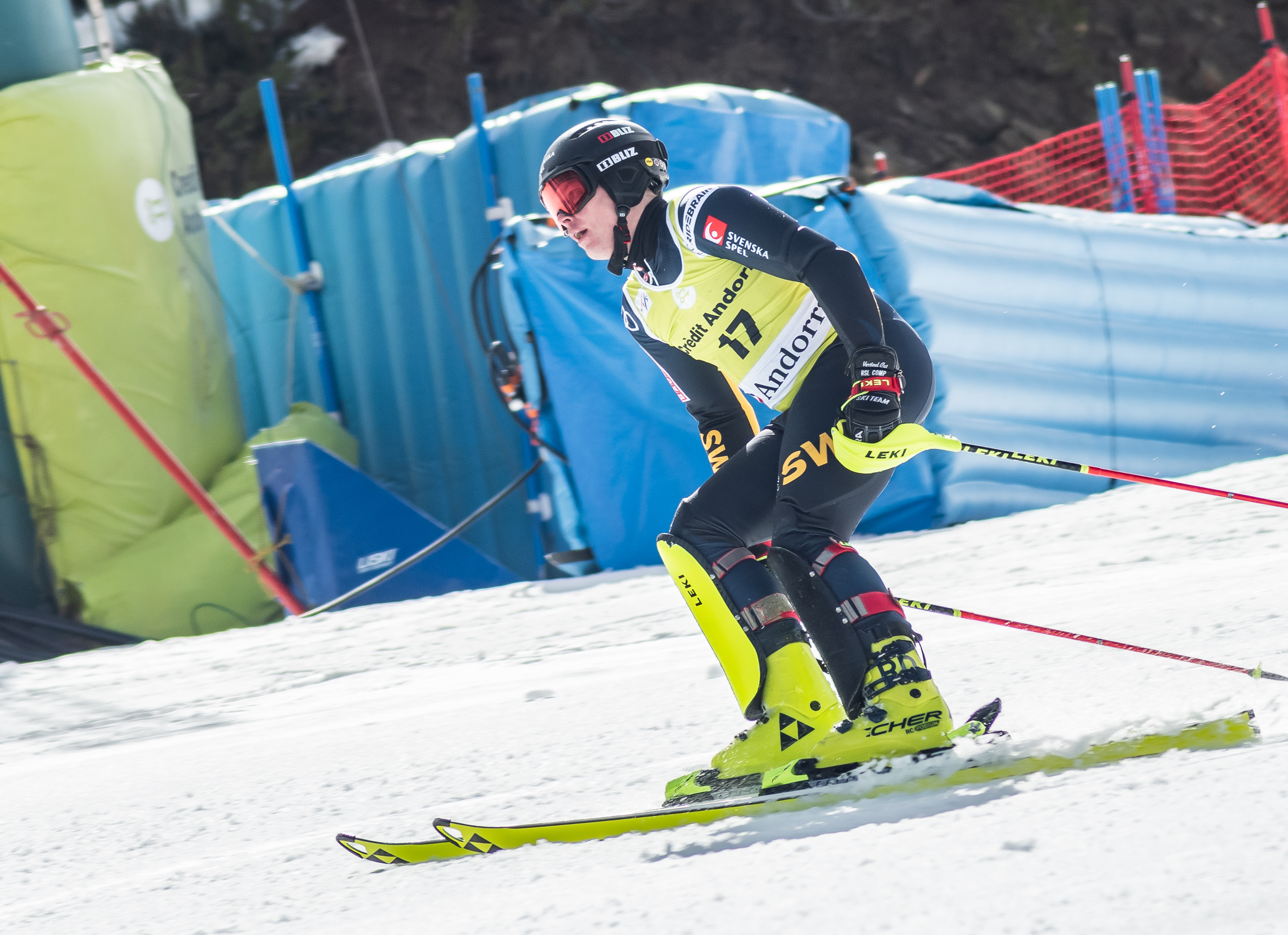
- Jakobsen in 2023

Personal information
- Born: 9 September 1994 (age 31) Boden, Sweden
- Height: 1.75 m (5 ft 9 in)

Skiing career
- Sport: Alpine skiing
- Club: Storklintens Alpina
- Disciplines: Slalom, Giant slalom
- World Cup debut: 23 October 2016 (age 22)

Olympics
- Teams: 2 – (2018, 2022)
- Medals: 0

World Championships
- Teams: 5 – (2017–2025)
- Medals: 2 (0 gold)

World Cup
- Seasons: 9 – (2017–2025)
- Wins: 0
- Podiums: 4 – (4 SL)
- Overall titles: 0 – (40th in 2024)
- Discipline titles: 0 – (10th in SL, 2024)
Medal record
Men's alpine skiing
Representing Sweden
World Championships
Silver medal – second place	2021 Cortina d’Ampezzo	Team event
Bronze medal – third place	2025 Saalbach	Team event

Kristoffer Jakobsen (born 9 September 1994) is a Swedish World Cup alpine ski racer who specialises in the slalom discipline. He represented Sweden in the 2018 Winter Olympics and was seventh in the slalom.

At his third World Championships in 2021, Jakobsen was part of the Swedish team that earned a silver medal in the combined men's and women's team competition. He attained his first World Cup podium in December 2021 with a runner-up finish in a slalom at Val d'Isère, France.

== World Cup results ==
=== Season standings ===
Season	Age	Overall	Slalom	Giant slalom	Super-G	Downhill	Combined	Parallel
2017	22	107	39	—	—	—	—	—N/a
2018	23	159	56	—	—	—	—	—N/a
2019	24	124	43	—	—	—	—	—N/a
2020	25	67	18	—	—	—	—	29
2021	26	54	21	—	—	—	—N/a	24
2022	27	52	19	—	—	—	—N/a	—
2023	28	51	19	—	—	—	—N/a	—N/a
2024	29	40	10	—	—	—	—N/a	—N/a
2025	30	11	4	—	—	—	—N/a	—N/a

Standings through 10 December 2024

=== Race podiums ===
- 0 wins
- 4 podiums – (4 SL); 15 top tens (15 SL)

Season	Date	Location	Discipline	Place
2022	12 December 2021	Val d'Isère, France	Slalom	2nd
2022	22 December 2021	Madonna di Campiglio, Italy	Slalom	3rd
2024	21 January 2024	Kitzbühel, Austria	Slalom	2nd
2025	24 November 2024	Gurgl, Austria	Slalom	2nd

== World Championship results ==
Year	Age	Slalom	Giant slalom	Super-G	Downhill	Combined	Team event
2017	22	DNF1	29	—	—	—	—
2019	24	DNF1	—	—	—	—	—
2021	26	DNF2	—	—	—	—	2
2023	28	DNF1	—	—	—	—	11

== Olympic results ==
Year	Age	Slalom	Giant slalom	Super-G	Downhill	Combined	Team event
2018	23	7	—	—	—	—	5
2022	27	DNF1	—	—	—	—	10
