= Niels Hintermann =

Swiss alpine skier

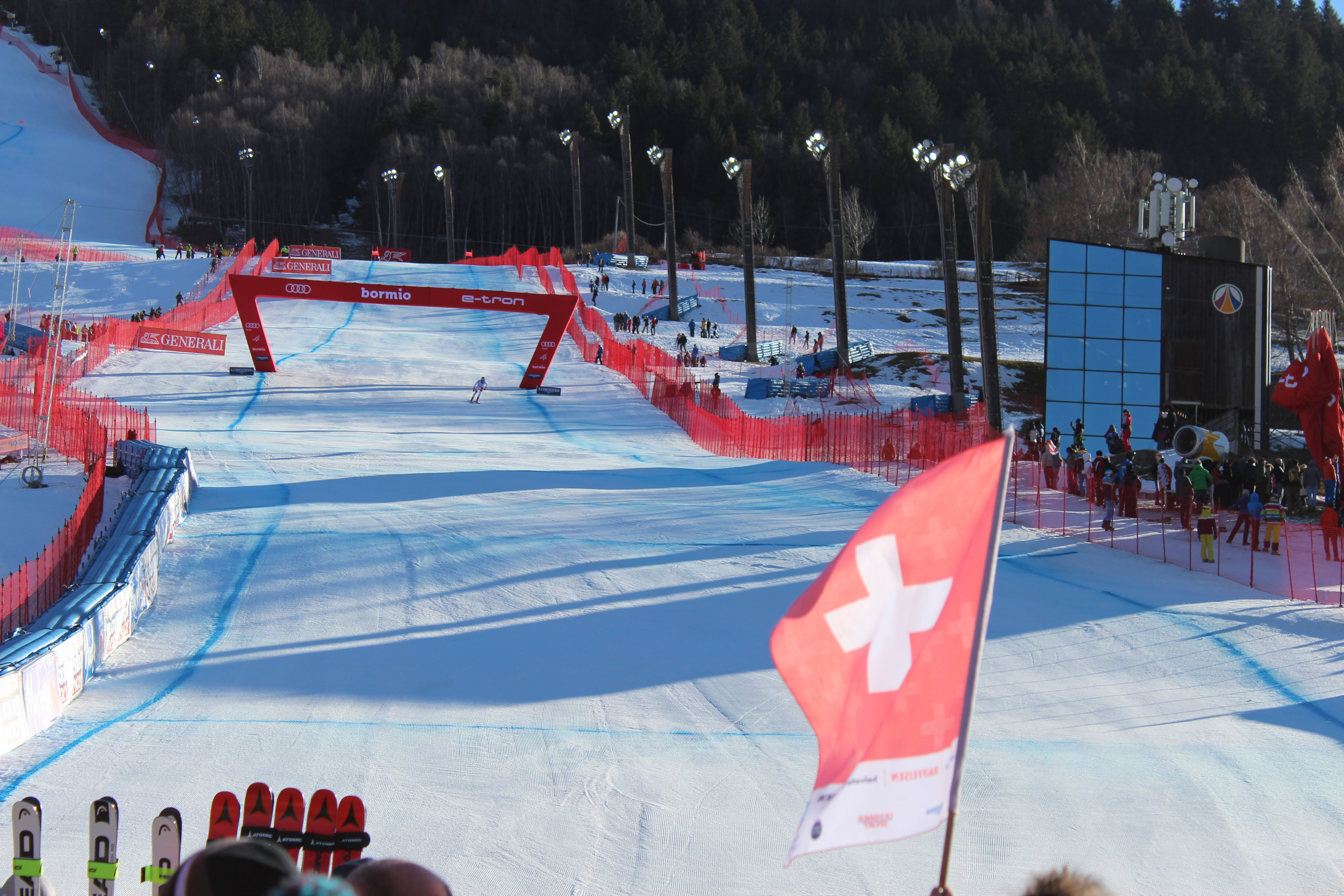
- Finishing at Bormio in late 2019

Personal information
- Born: 5 May 1995 (age 31) Bülach, Zürich, Switzerland
- Height: 1.89 m (6 ft 2 in)
- Website: nielshintermann.ch

Skiing career
- Country: Switzerland
- Sport: Alpine skiing
- Club: Hausen am Albis
- Retired: 13 March 2026 (age 31)
- Disciplines: Downhill, Super-G, Combined
- World Cup debut: 28 November 2015 (age 20)

Olympics
- Teams: 1 – (2022)
- Medals: 0

World Championships
- Teams: 3 – (2019, 2021, 2023)
- Medals: 0

World Cup
- Seasons: 9 – (2016–2017, 2019–2024, 2026)
- Wins: 3 – (2 DH, 1 AC)
- Podiums: 7 – (6 DH, 1 AC)
- Overall titles: 0 – (13th in 2022)
- Discipline titles: 0 – (2nd in AC, 2017)
Medal record
Men's alpine skiing
Representing Switzerland
World Junior Ski Championships
Bronze medal – third place	2015 Hafjell	Downhill

Niels Hintermann (born 5 May 1995) is a Swiss World Cup alpine ski racer. Born in Bülach, Zürich, he specialized in the speed events of downhill and super-G.

== Career ==
Hintermann made his World Cup debut at age 20 in November 2015 at Lake Louise, and was 40th in the downhill. He scored his first World Cup points three weeks later at Val Gardena, at 29th place in the downhill. Hintermann won his first World Cup race (and first podium) the following season, in the combined at Wengen in January 2017. In October 2024, Hintermann announced that he had been diagnosed with lymphoma, which is why he did not compete in any races during the 2024–25 World Cup season. On 13 March 2026, Hintermann declared his immediate retirement, citing what he regarded as the excessive risks of the sport. He stated that before his last downhill races, he had suffered from panic attacks. Since he had qualified by finishing among the top 25 in the 2026 downhill standings, race organizers at the World Cup Finals gave Hintermann a farewell run at Kvitfjell – the site of Hintermann's two downhill World Cup victories.

== World Cup results ==
=== Season standings ===
Season
Season	Age	Overall	Slalom	Giant slalom	Super-G	Downhill	Combined
2016	20	122	—	—	—	48	42
2017	21	53	—	—	41	37	2
2018	22	injured; did not compete					
2019	23	69	—	—	55	23	28
2020	24	33	—	—	—	12	19
2021	25	93	—	—	55	28	—N/a
2022	26	13	—	—	27	7	—N/a
2023	27	24	—	—	34	7	—N/a
2024	28	33	—	—	33	6	—N/a
2025	29	injured; did not compete					—N/a
2026	30	59	—	—	—	18	—N/a

=== Race podiums ===
- 3 wins – (2 DH, 1 AC)
- 7 podiums – (6 DH, 1 AC), 27 top tens

Season
Season	Date	Location	Discipline	Place
2017	13 January 2017	Wengen, Switzerland	Combined	1st
2022	18 December 2021	Val Gardena, Italy	Downhill	3rd
2022	28 December 2021	Bormio, Italy	Downhill	3rd
2022	4 March 2022	Kvitfjell, Norway	Downhill	1st
2022	5 March 2022	Kvitfjell, Norway	Downhill	3rd
2023	20 January 2023	Kitzbühel, Austria	Downhill	3rd
2024	17 February 2024	Kvitfjell, Norway	Downhill	1st

== World Championship results ==
Year
Year	Age	Slalom	Giant slalom	Super-G	Downhill	Combined
2019	23	—	—	—	21	23
2021	25	—	—	—	DNF	—
2023	27	—	—	—	12	—

== Olympic results ==
Year
Year	Age	Slalom	Giant slalom	Super-G	Downhill	Combined
2022	26	—	—	—	16	—
