= Blaise Giezendanner =

French alpine skier (born 1991)

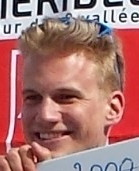
- Giezendanner in 2014

Personal information
- Born: 29 November 1991 (age 34) Chamonix, France
- Height: 1.81 m (5 ft 11 in)

Skiing career
- Country: France
- Sport: Alpine skiing
- Club: C.S. Chamonix
- Disciplines: Downhill, super-G, combined
- World Cup debut: 23 February 2013 (age 21)

Olympics
- Teams: 1 – (2018)
- Medals: 0

World Championships
- Teams: 1 – (2017)
- Medals: 0

World Cup
- Seasons: 13 – (2013, 2015–2026)
- Wins: 0
- Podiums: 1 – (1 DH)
- Overall titles: 0 – (58th in 2024)
- Discipline titles: 0 – (19th in DH, 2024)
Medal record
Men's alpine skiing
Representing France
Winter Universiade
Gold medal – first place	2013 Trentino	Super-G
Silver medal – second place	2013 Trentino	Downhill
Silver medal – second place	2013 Trentino	Combined

Blaise Giezendanner (born 29 November 1991) is a French alpine ski racer who specializes in the speed events of downhill and super-G. At the 2013 Winter Universiade, he won a silver medal in the downhill and combined, and a gold medal in the super-G.

== Career ==
Giezendanner made his World Cup debut on 23 February 2013 in the Garmisch-Partenkirchen downhill finishing in 53rd position. In December 2013 he represented France at the 2013 Winter Universiade in Trentino, Italy. He finished 13th in the giant slalom, 2nd in the downhill and the combined, and 1st in the super-G.

On 21 February 2015, he scored his first World Cup points in the Saalbach downhill. He attained his first top 10 World Cup result on 7 February 2016, finishing eighth in the Jeongseon super-G. Apart from FIS events, Giezendanner competed at the 2018 Winter Olympics, and was fourth in the super-G.

== World Cup results ==
=== Season standings ===
Season
Season	Age	Overall	Slalom	Giant slalom	Super-G	Downhill	Combined
2015	23	147	—	—	—	57	—
2016	24	65	—	—	32	29	23
2017	25	62	—	—	23	34	25
2018	26	89	—	—	22	—	—
2019	27	101	—	—	25	55	41
2020	28	108	—	—	32	57	34
2021	29	80	—	—	21	54	—N/a
2022	30	59	—	—	25	29	—N/a
2023	31	82	—	—	26	52	—N/a
2024	32	58	—	—	36	19	—N/a
2025	33	72	—	—	27	33	—N/a
2026	34	86	—	—	45	31	—N/a

=== Top-ten results ===
- 1 podium – (1 DH); 10 top tens

Season
Season	Date	Location	Discipline	Place
2016	7 February 2016	Jeongseon, South Korea	Super-G	8th
2016	19 February 2016	Chamonix, France	Combined	10th
2016	20 February 2016	Chamonix, France	Downhill	9th
2018	19 January 2018	Kitzbühel, Austria	Super-G	9th
2022	29 December 2021	Bormio, Italy	Super-G	9th
2022	21 January 2022	Kitzbühel, Austria	Downhill	3rd
2023	13 January 2023	Wengen, Switzerland	Super-G	10th
2024	20 January 2024	Kitzbühel, Austria	Downhill	7th
2025	6 December 2024	Beaver Creek, United States	Downhill	7th
2025	20 December 2024	(Italy) Val Gardena, United States	Super-G	9th

== World Championship results ==
Year
Year	Age	Slalom	Giant slalom	Super-G	Downhill	Combined
2017	25	—	—	14	—	—

== Olympic results ==
Year
Year	Age	Slalom	Giant slalom	Super-G	Downhill	Combined
2018	26	—	—	4	—	—
2022	30	—	—	9	26	—
