= Bryce Bennett (alpine skier) =

American alpine skier (born 1992)

Personal information
- Born: July 14, 1992 (age 34) Truckee, California, U.S.
- Height: 6 ft 7 in (201 cm)

Skiing career
- Country: United States
- Sport: Alpine skiing
- Club: Squaw Valley Ski Team
- Disciplines: Downhill, Combined, Super-G
- World Cup debut: December 1, 2013 (age 21)

Olympics
- Teams: 3 – (2018, 2022, 2026)
- Medals: 0

World Championships
- Teams: 4 – (2017, 2019, 2021, 2025)
- Medals: 0

World Cup
- Seasons: 13 – (2014–2026)
- Wins: 2 – (2 DH)
- Podiums: 3 – (3 DH)
- Overall titles: 0 – (31st in 2024)
- Discipline titles: 0 – (5th in DH, 2024)

Bryce Bennett (born July 14, 1992) is an American World Cup alpine ski racer who competes in the speed disciplines and specializes in the downhill event. He has competed in three World Championships and two Winter Olympics.

He joined the U.S. Ski Team in 2011 after a spring tryout camp and, though he missed out on the 2014 Olympic team, he saw his breakout season come in 2015. In December of that year, Bennett went from the 57th starting position to cross the finish line in sixth at a World Cup downhill in Val Gardena, Italy, for his first top ten.

== World Cup results ==
=== Season standings ===
| Season | Age | Overall | Slalom | Giant slalom | Super-G | Downhill | Combined |
|---|---|---|---|---|---|---|---|
| 2016 | 23 | 80 | — | — | — | 34 | 16 |
| 2017 | 24 | 65 | — | — | 43 | 26 | 18 |
| 2018 | 25 | 45 | — | — | 47 | 20 | 14 |
| 2019 | 26 | 32 | — | — | — | 7 | 22 |
| 2020 | 27 | 48 | — | — | — | 16 | 16 |
| 2021 | 28 | 63 | — | — | 38 | 19 | —N/a |
| 2022 | 29 | 38 | — | — | 46 | 12 | —N/a |
| 2023 | 30 | 87 | — | — | 61 | 35 | —N/a |
| 2024 | 31 | 31 | — | — | 38 | 5 | —N/a |
| 2025 | 32 | 47 | — | — | 41 | 13 | —N/a |
| 2026 | 33 | 93 | — | — | 52 | 32 | —N/a |

Standings through February 7, 2026

=== Race podiums ===
- 2 wins – (2 DH)
- 3 podiums – (3 DH), 25 top tens – (21 DH, 1 SG, 3 AC)

| Season | Date | Location | Discipline | Place |
|---|---|---|---|---|
| 2022 | December 18, 2021 | Val Gardena, Italy | Downhill | 1st |
| 2024 | December 14, 2023 | Val Gardena, Italy | Downhill | 1st |
| 2024 | December 16, 2023 | Val Gardena, Italy | Downhill | 3rd |

== World Championship results ==
| Year | Age | Slalom | Giant slalom | Super-G | Downhill | Combined | Team combined |
|---|---|---|---|---|---|---|---|
| 2017 | 24 | — | — | — | 26 | 11 | —N/a |
| 2019 | 26 | — | — | 23 | 9 | 11 | —N/a |
| 2021 | 28 | — | — | 27 | 10 | 16 | —N/a |
| 2025 | 32 | — | — | 15 | 10 | —N/a | 15 |

== Olympic results ==
| Year | Age | Slalom | Giant slalom | Super-G | Downhill | Combined | Team combined |
|---|---|---|---|---|---|---|---|
| 2018 | 25 | — | — | — | 16 | 17 | —N/a |
| 2022 | 29 | — | — | 17 | 19 | — | —N/a |
| 2026 | 33 | — | — | — | 13 | —N/a | — |
