= Matthieu Bailet =

French alpine skier (born 1996)

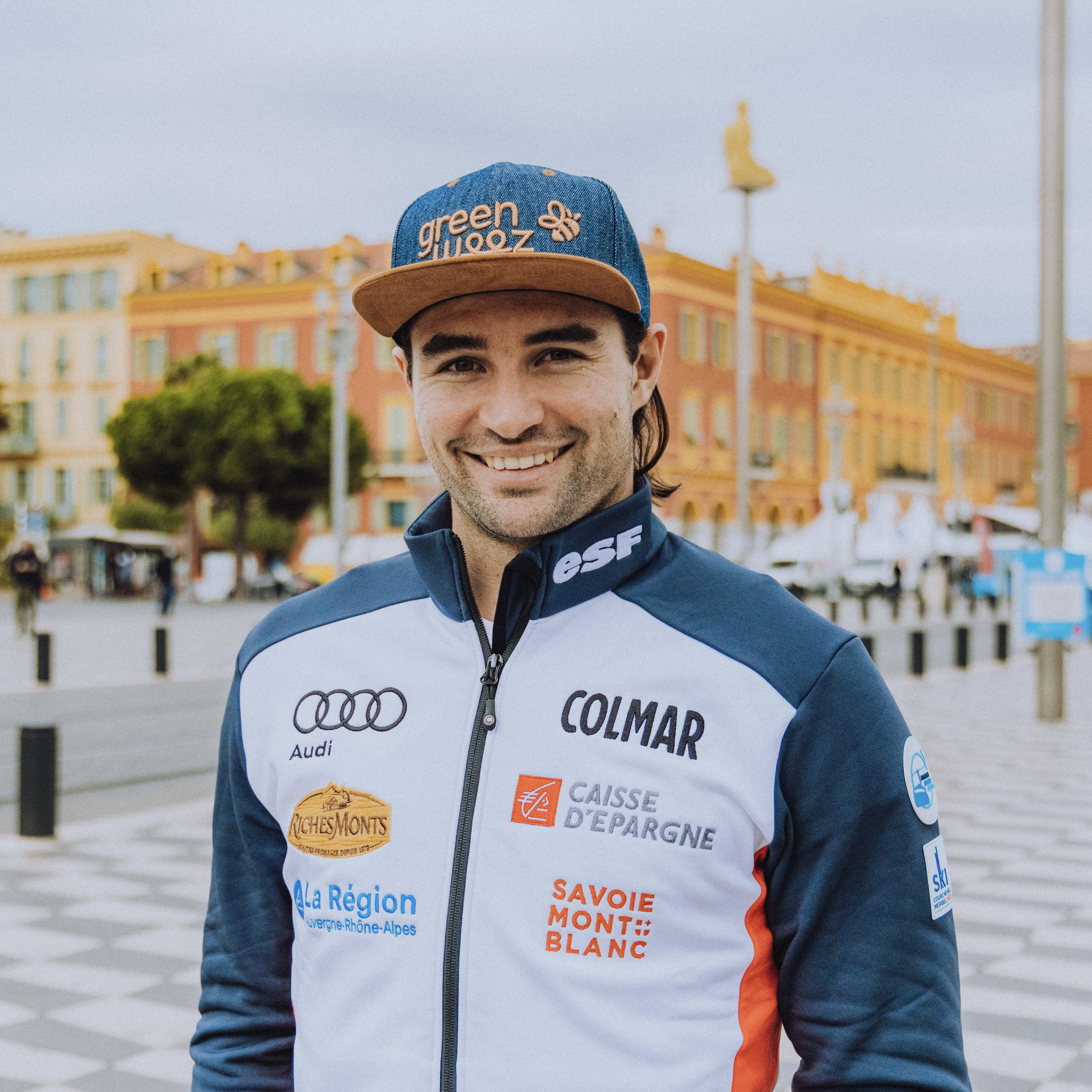
- Bailet in 2021

Personal information
- Born: 23 April 1996 (age 30) Nice, Alpes-Maritimes, France

Skiing career
- Country: France
- Sport: Alpine skiing
- Club: Inter Club Nice
- Disciplines: Downhill, Super-G
- World Cup debut: 17 March 2016 (age 19)

Olympics
- Teams: 1 – (2022)
- Medals: 0

World Championships
- Teams: 2 – (2021, 2025)
- Medals: 0

World Cup
- Seasons: 11 – (2016–2026)
- Wins: 0
- Podiums: 1 – (1 SG)
- Overall titles: 0 – (28th in 2021)
- Discipline titles: 0 – (11th in DH, 2021)
Medal record
Men's alpine skiing
Representing France
Junior World Championships
Gold medal – first place	2016 Sochi	Super-G

Matthieu Bailet (born 23 April 1996) is a French World Cup alpine ski racer from Nice, France. He specializes in the speed events of downhill and super-G. He has been sponsored by HEAD since 2022.

Bailet made his World Cup debut in March 2016 at St. Moritz, Switzerland, following his gold medal at the Junior World Championships. His first podium was five years later, as the runner-up in a super-G at Saalbach-Hinterglemm, Austria. In September 2026, American skier Lindsey Vonn and Bailet publicly announced their relationship.

== World Cup results ==
=== Season standings ===
Season
Season	Age	Overall	Slalom	Giant slalom	Super-G	Downhill	Combined
2017	20	137	—	—	45	—	—
2018	21	135	—	—	47	48	—
2019	22	76	—	—	52	22	—
2020	23	70	—	—	51	17	—
2021	24	28	—	—	13	11	—N/a
2022	25	39	—	—	13	28	—N/a
2023	26	69	—	—	30	38	—N/a
2024	27	76	—	—	61	21	—N/a
2025	28	92	—	—	44	40	—N/a
2026	29	77	—	—	23	50	—N/a

=== Top-ten results ===
- 1 podium – (1 SG); 15 top tens (8 DH, 7 SG)

Season
Season	Date	Location	Discipline	Place
2019	28 December 2018	Bormio, Italy	Downhill	6th
2020	27 December 2019	Bormio, Italy	Downhill	6th
2021	30 December 2020	Bormio, Italy	Downhill	8th
2021	22 January 2021	Kitzbühel, Austria	Downhill	7th
2021	24 January 2021	Kitzbühel, Austria	Downhill	9th
2021	25 January 2021	Kitzbühel, Austria	Super-G	8th
2021	7 March 2021	Saalbach-Hinterglemm, Austria	Super-G	2nd
2022	27 November 2021	Lake Louise, Canada	Downhill	7th
2022	3 December 2021	Beaver Creek, United States	Super-G	7th
2022	29 December 2021	Bormio, Italy	Super-G	6th
2022	17 March 2022	Courchevel, France	Super-G	6th
2023	27 November 2022	Lake Louise, Canada	Super-G	5th
2023	3 December 2022	Beaver Creek, United States	Downhill	8th
2024	14 December 2023	Val Gardena, Italy	Downhill	7th
2026	19 December 2025	Val Gardena, Italy	Super-G	5th

== World Championship results ==
Year
Year	Age	Slalom	Giant slalom	Super-G	Downhill	Combined	Team combined
2021	24	—	—	7	25	—	—N/a
2025	28	—	—	DNF	—	—N/a	10

== Olympic results ==
Year
Year	Age	Slalom	Giant slalom	Super-G	Downhill	Combined
2022	25	—	—	DNF	27	—
