= Josef Ferstl =

German alpine skier

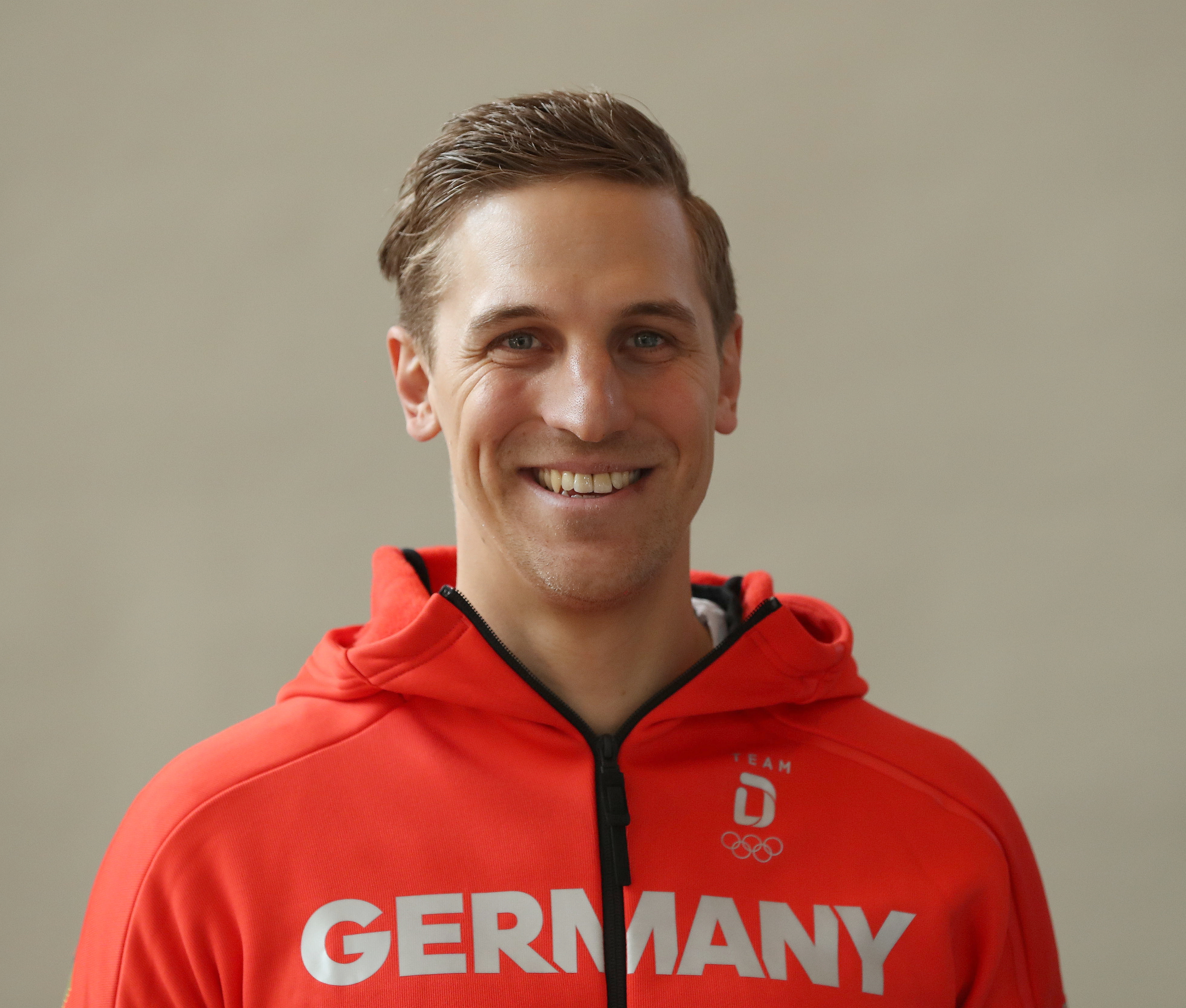
- Ferstl in 2018

Personal information
- Born: 29 December 1988 (age 37) Traunstein, West Germany
- Height: 1.79 m (5 ft 10 in)

Skiing career
- Sport: Alpine skiing
- Club: SC Hammer
- Disciplines: Super-G, Downhill
- World Cup debut: 23 February 2007 (age 18)

Olympics
- Teams: 2 – (2018, 2022)
- Medals: 0

World Championships
- Teams: 4 – (2015–2019, 2023)
- Medals: 0

World Cup
- Seasons: 13 – (2007, 2012–2023)
- Wins: 2 – (2 SG)
- Podiums: 2 – (2 SG)
- Overall titles: 0 – (23rd in 2019)
- Discipline titles: 0 – (6th in SG, 2018)

Josef Ferstl (born 29 December 1988) is a retired German World Cup alpine ski racer, focusing on the speed events of Downhill and Super-G. He has competed in three World Championships and the 2018 Winter Olympics. Ferstl made his World Cup debut in 2007 and has two victories, both in Super-G.

His father is West German alpine racer Sepp Ferstl, who won the Hahnenkamm downhill in Kitzbühel in 1978 and 1979. Forty years later in 2019, the younger Ferstl became the first German to win a Super-G at Kitzbühel, and the trophy was presented to him by his father.

== World Cup results ==
=== Season standings ===
Season	Age	Overall	Slalom	Giant slalom	Super-G	Downhill	Combined
2013	24	97	—	—	—	40	32
2014	25	129	—	—	46	—	—
2015	26	67	—	—	45	28	35
2016	27	95	—	—	35	42	—
2017	28	47	—	—	13	27	—
2018	29	34	—	—	6	31	—
2019	30	23	—	—	9	14	—
2020	31	74	—	—	29	26	—
2021	32	68	—	—	22	38	—N/a
2022	33	48	—	—	21	22	—N/a
2023	34	56	—	—	43	21	—N/a

=== Race podiums ===
- 2 wins – (2 SG)
- 2 podiums – (2 SG); 16 top tens – (8 DH, 8 SG)

Season	Date	Location	Discipline	Place
2018	15 December 2017	Val Gardena, Italy	Super-G	1st
2019	27 January 2019	Kitzbühel, Austria	Super-G	1st

== World Championship results ==
Year	Age	Slalom	Giant slalom	Super-G	Downhill	Combined
2015	26	—	—	25	22	25
2017	28	—	—	26	18	25
2019	30	—	—	6	28	—
2023	34	—	—	DNF	27	—

== Olympic results ==
Year	Age	Slalom	Giant slalom	Super-G	Downhill	Combined
2018	29	—	—	27	25	DNS2
2022	33	—	—	18	23	—
