= 2020 Alpine Skiing World Cup – Men's downhill =

Alpine ski discipline year standings

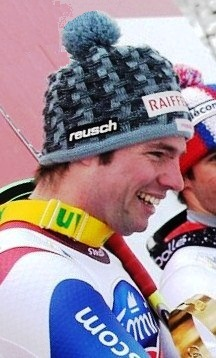
2020 Men's downhill World Cup: Beat Feuz of Switzerland, season champion; 2020 Men's World Cup; Overall • Downhill • Super-G; Giant slalom • Slalom; Combined • Parallel
Previous: 2019	Next: 2021

The men's downhill in the 2020 FIS Alpine Skiing World Cup consisted of nine events, with only one cancellation from the scheduled ten.

Swiss skier Beat Feuz won his third consecutive season title in this discipline, just missing clinching the title with two races to go after finishing second at Saalbach-Hinterglemm and opening a 194-point lead over Germany's Thomas Dreßen, and then finally clinching the title in the next race by finishing fourth at Kvitfjell.

However, the final race, which had been scheduled for Wednesday, 18 March as part of the season finals in Cortina d'Ampezzo, Italy, was cancelled due to the COVID-19 pandemic.

== Standings ==
Rank	Name	30 Nov 2019; Lake Louise (Canada)	7 Dec 2019; Beaver Creek (United States)	27 Dec 2019; Bormio (Italy)	28 Dec 2019; Bormio (Italy)	18 Jan 2020; Wengen (Switzerland)	25 Jan 2020; Kitzbühel (Austria)	1 Feb 2020; Garmisch-Partenkirchen (Germany)	13 Feb 2020; Saalbach-Hinterglemm (Austria)	7 Mar 2020; Kvitfjell (Norway)	18 Mar 2020; Cortina d'Ampezzo (Italy)	Total
	(Switzerland) Beat Feuz	60	100	80	60	100	80	40	80	50	x	650
2	(Germany) Thomas Dreßen	100	12	29	DNS	60	5	100	100	32	x	438
3	(Austria) Matthias Mayer	45	0	60	45	50	100	DNS	24	100	x	424
4	(Norway) Aleksander Aamodt Kilde	22	36	50	50	40	29	80	26	80	x	413
5	(Italy) Dominik Paris	80	24	100	100	80	DNS					384
6	(Austria) Vincent Kriechmayr	36	80	DNF	26	32	80	50	40	18	x	362
7	(France) Johan Clarey	20	80	26	36	0	50	60	29	15	x	318
8	(Switzerland) Carlo Janka	60	14	9	0	16	28	24	50	60	x	259
9	(Norway) Kjetil Jansrud	32	29	11	0	24	40	32	40	40	x	248
10	(Switzerland) Mauro Caviezel	40	18	DNS		45	7	14	60	36	x	220
11	(France) Maxence Muzaton	15	4	45	29	12	45	7	32	24	x	213
12	(Switzerland) Niels Hintermann	8	3	0	40	32	15	36	45	DNS	x	179
13	(United States) Travis Ganong	26	0	32	0	4	1	45	16	45	x	169
14	(United States) Ryan Cochran-Siegle	1	40	24	24	18	DNF	22	0	14	x	143
15	(Switzerland) Urs Kryenbühl	0	8	20	80	DNS				12	x	120
	(United States) Bryce Bennett	8	0	0	0	36	32	8	22	14	x	120
17	(France) Matthieu Bailet	10	24	40	20	6	0	0	14	0	x	114
18	(Austria) Daniel Danklmaier	13	7	1	0	22	14	15	18	22	x	112
19	(France) Adrien Théaux	29	29	18	32	DNS						108
20	(United States) Steven Nyman	26	14	7	12	10	20	2	10	DNF	x	101
21	(France) Nils Allègre	9	15	12	6	16	9	9	16	1	x	93
22	(Germany) Romed Baumann	16	2	8	1	7	36	12	6	0	x	88
	(Austria) Otmar Striedinger	8	6	11	15	16	DNF	10	13	9	x	88
24	(Italy) Mattia Casse	DNF	DNF	13	11	16	18	5	4	20	x	87
25	(Norway) Adrian Smiseth Sejersted	0	45	15	18	DNS						78
	(Germany) Josef Ferstl	18	0	7	10	0	6	22	8	7	x	78
	References											

- Winner
- 2nd place
- 3rd place
- DNF = Did not finish
- DNS = Did not start
- Updated at 8 March 2020, after all events.

== See also ==
- 2020 Alpine Skiing World Cup – Men's summary rankings
- 2020 Alpine Skiing World Cup – Men's overall
- 2020 Alpine Skiing World Cup – Men's super-G
- 2020 Alpine Skiing World Cup – Men's giant slalom
- 2020 Alpine Skiing World Cup – Men's slalom
- 2020 Alpine Skiing World Cup – Men's combined
- 2020 Alpine Skiing World Cup – Men's parallel
- World Cup scoring system
