= 2021 Alpine Skiing World Cup – Men's super-G =

Alpine ski discipline year standings

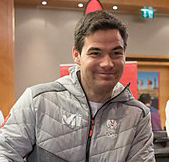
2021 Men's Super-G World Cup: Vincent Kriechmayr of Austria, season champion; 2021 Men's World Cup; Overall • Downhill • Super-G; Giant slalom • Slalom • Parallel
Previous: 2020	Next: 2022

The men's super-G in the 2021 FIS Alpine Skiing World Cup consisted of six events, although seven had been originally scheduled.

After midseason injuries to former discipline champions Aleksander Aamodt Kilde of Norway and Mauro Caviezel of Switzerland, Austrian skier Vincent Kriechmayr won the next two races and opened a huge lead in the discipline standings. Going into the finals, only Marco Odermatt of Switzerland retained a slim mathematical chance of surpassing Kriechmayr. The final was scheduled for Thursday, 18 March in Lenzerheide, Switzerland. Only the top 25 of the specific ranking and the winner of the Junior World Championship were eligible, except that athletes who have scored at least 500 points in the overall classification could participate in all specialties. However, a continuation of the heavy snow and bad weather that had forced the cancellation of the downhill final the day before also forced cancellation of the Super-G final, ending Odermatt's chances and giving Kriechmayr the crystal globe.

The season was interrupted by the 2021 World Ski Championships, which were held from 8–21 February in Cortina d'Ampezzo, Italy. The men's super-G was scheduled for 9 February but was postponed due to fog and finally took place on 11 February 2021.

== Standings ==
Rank	Name	12 Dec 2020; Val-d'Isère (France)	18 Dec 2020; Val Gardena/Gröden (Italy)	29 Dec 2020; Bormio (Italy)	25 Jan 2021; Kitzbühel (Austria)	6 Feb 2021; Garmisch-Partenkirchen (Germany)	7 Mar 2021; Saalbach-Hinterglemm (Austria)	18 Mar 2021; Lenzerheide (Switzerland)	Total
	(Austria) Vincent Kriechmayr	45	16	80	100	100	60	x	401
2	(Switzerland) Marco Odermatt	20	29	29	80	60	100	x	318
3	(Austria) Matthias Mayer	24	50	26	60	80	36	x	276
4	(Switzerland) Mauro Caviezel	100	80	45	DNS				225
5	(Norway) Aleksander Aamodt Kilde	22	100	50	DNS				172
6	(Germany) Andreas Sander	32	45	11	29	20	32	x	169
7	(Norway) Kjetil Jansrud	40	60	40	DNS	20	0	x	160
8	(Austria) Christian Walder	60	20	0	45	9	11	x	145
9	(Norway) Adrian Smiseth Sejersted	80	0	60	DNS				140
10	(United States) Ryan Cochran-Siegle	0	32	100	DNF	DNS			132
	(Italy) Christof Innerhofer	32	5	0	50	45	DNF	x	132
12	(Switzerland) Beat Feuz	26	26	0	DNF	29	40	x	121
13	(France) Matthieu Bailet	DNF	0	DNS	32	0	80	x	112
14	(France) Nils Allègre	9	40	12	DNF	50	DNF	x	111
15	(Germany) Romed Baumann	0	15	36	24	26	2	x	103
16	(United States) Travis Ganong	50	6	16	4	22	3	x	101
17	(France) Alexis Pinturault	36	DNS	22	22	DNS	16	x	96
18	(Austria) Max Franz	18	14	7	11	40	DNF	x	90
19	(Italy) Dominik Paris	15	22	13	6	32	0	x	88
20	(Switzerland) Loïc Meillard	0	DNS	20	29	36	DNF	x	85
21	(France) Blaise Giezendanner	14	10	18	7	8	18	x	75
22	(Germany) Josef Ferstl	13	11	10	20	DNS	20	x	74
23	(Switzerland) Urs Kryenbühl	11	24	32	DNS				67
24	(Canada) James Crawford	0	4	3	40	12	5	x	64
	(Switzerland) Gino Caviezel	5	0	24	9	26	0	x	64
	References								

- Winner
- 2nd place
- 3rd place
- DNF = Did not finish
- DNS = Did not start
- Updated at 18 March 2021, after all events.

== See also ==
- 2021 Alpine Skiing World Cup – Men's summary rankings
- 2021 Alpine Skiing World Cup – Men's overall
- 2021 Alpine Skiing World Cup – Men's downhill
- 2021 Alpine Skiing World Cup – Men's giant slalom
- 2021 Alpine Skiing World Cup – Men's slalom
- 2021 Alpine Skiing World Cup – Men's parallel
- World Cup scoring system
