= 2017 Alpine Skiing World Cup – Men's combined =

Alpine ski discipline year standings

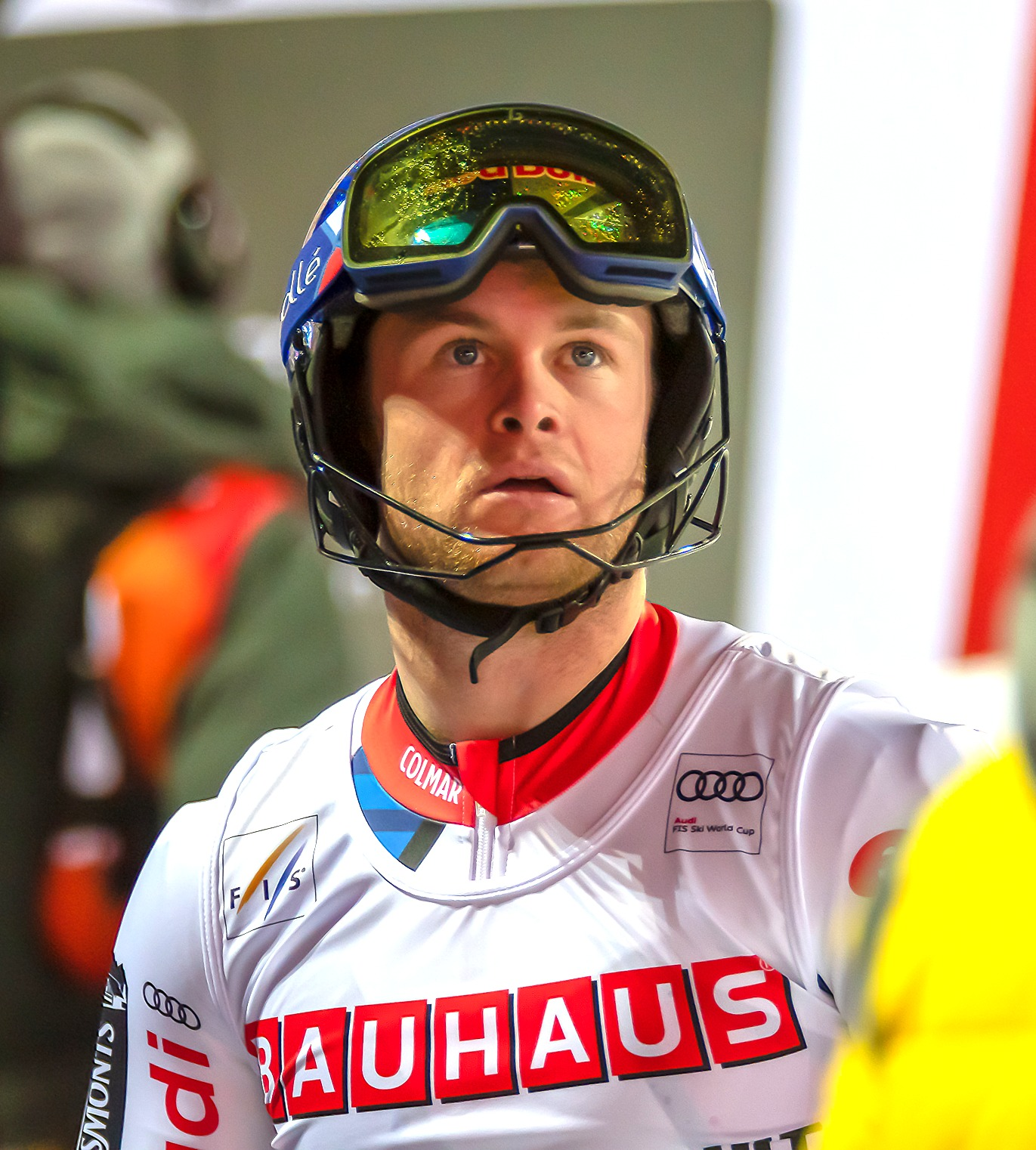
2017 Men's combined World Cup: Alexis Pinturault of France, season champion; 2017 Men's World Cup; Overall • Downhill • Super-G; Giant slalom • Slalom • Combined
Previous: 2016	Next: 2018

The Men's combined in the 2017 FIS Alpine Skiing World Cup involved two events. Defending discipline champion Alexis Pinturault of France upset overall slalom discipline leader Marcel Hirscher in the slalom leg to win the first combined of the season at Santa Caterina, Italy. When Hirscher opted to skip the second combined, Pinturault was heavily favored in the race at Wengen, Switzerland as well, but heavy falling snow during the downhill leg (which, for a change, was run last due to the conditions) provided a huge edge to the early starters and led to a shock podium topped by Niels Hintermann of Switzerland, who had never before finished in the top 20 in a World Cup race—and Pinturault only placed 20th after sitting fourth following the slalom leg. Nevertheless, combining that showing with his prior victory was sufficient to give Pinturault the discipline crown (and the crystal globe) for the 2016–17 season.

The season was interrupted by the 2017 World Ski Championships, which were held from 6–20 February in St. Moritz, Switzerland. The men's combined (run as a super-combined, with a downhill followed by a slalom) was held on 13 February.

At this time, combined races were not included in the season finals, which were scheduled in 2017 in Aspen, Colorado (USA).

== Standings ==
#	Skier	29 Dec 2016; Santa Caterina (Italy)	13 Jan 2017; Wengen (Switzerland)	Tot.
	(France) Alexis Pinturault	100	11	111
2	(Switzerland) Niels Hintermann	DNF1	100	100
3	(Norway) Aleksander Aamodt Kilde	60	32	92
4	(Switzerland) Justin Murisier	50	36	86
5	(Austria) Marcel Hirscher	80	DNS	80
	(France) Maxence Muzaton	DNS	80	80
7	(France) Valentin Giraud Moine	29	50	79
8	(Austria) Frederic Berthold	0	60	60
9	(France) Victor Muffat-Jeandet	45	13	58
10	(Switzerland) Mauro Caviezel	32	22	54
11	(Switzerland) Nils Mani	6	45	51
12	(Slovenia) Martin Čater	15	29	44
13	(Austria) Romed Baumann	2	40	42
14	(Canada) Erik Read	40	DNS	40
15	(Switzerland) Luca Aerni	36	DNS	36
	(Slovenia) Klemen Kosi	20	16	36
17	(Austria) Vincent Kriechmayr	18	14	32
18	(United States) Bryce Bennett	5	26	29
19	(Czech Republic) Kryštof Krýzl	22	6	28
20	(United States) Ryan Cochran-Siegle	26	DNF1	26
21	(Norway) Kjetil Jansrud	DNF2	24	24
	(United States) Brennan Rubie	24	DNS	24
23	(Slovakia) Adam Žampa	14	7	21
24	(Italy) Paolo Pangrazzi	DNF1	20	20
25	(France) Blaise Giezendanner	9	10	19
	References			

- Winner
- 2nd place
- 3rd place
- DNS = Did Not Start
- DNS2 = Finished run 1; Did Not Start run 2
- DNF1 = Did Not Finish run 1
- DNF2 = Did Not Finish run 2
- Updated at 19 March 2017, after all events.

== See also ==
- 2017 Alpine Skiing World Cup – Men's summary rankings
- 2017 Alpine Skiing World Cup – Men's overall
- 2017 Alpine Skiing World Cup – Men's downhill
- 2017 Alpine Skiing World Cup – Men's super-G
- 2017 Alpine Skiing World Cup – Men's giant slalom
- 2017 Alpine Skiing World Cup – Men's slalom
