= 2017 Alpine Skiing World Cup – Men's super-G =

Alpine ski discipline year standings

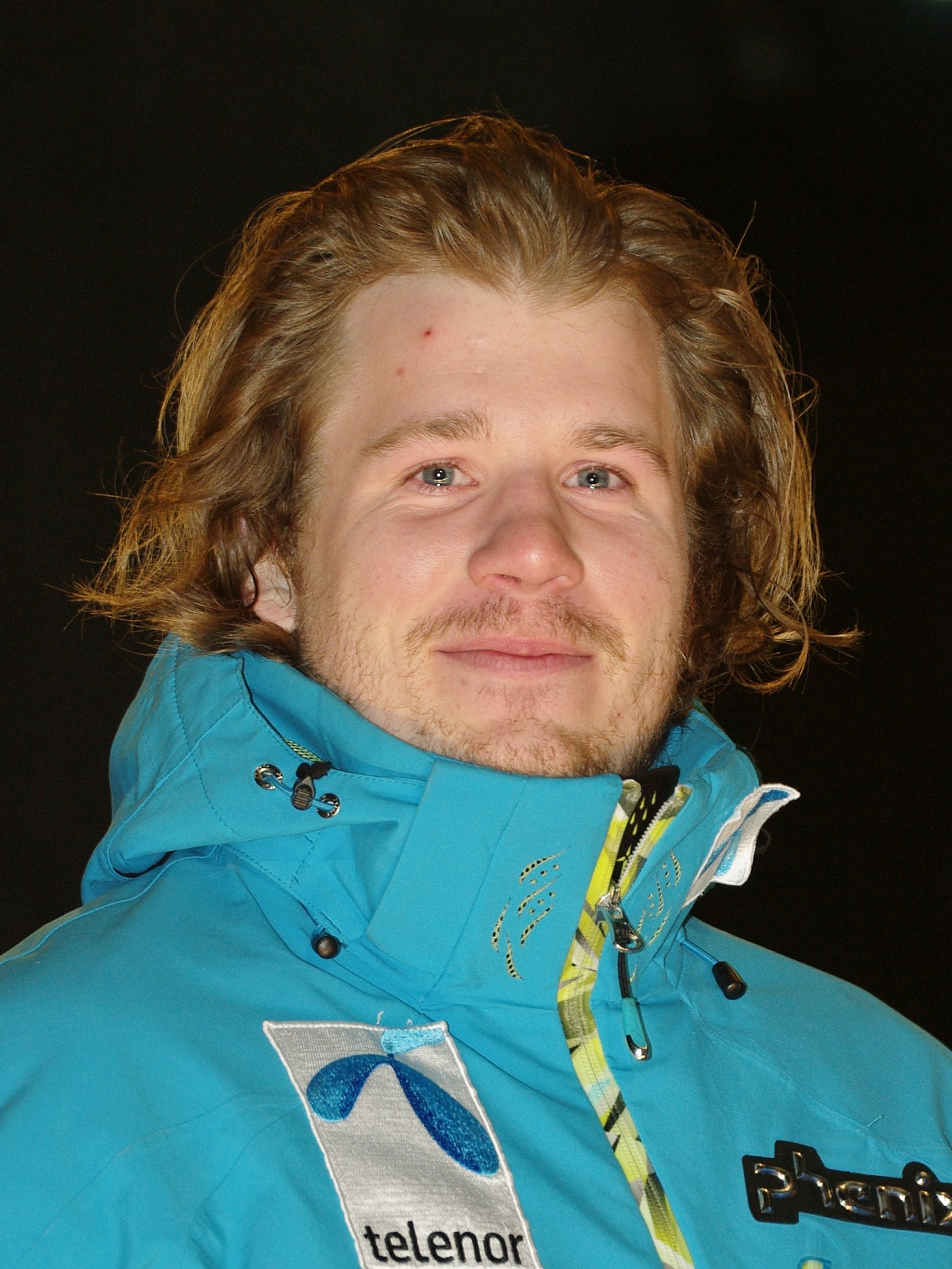
2017 Men's Super-G World Cup: Kjetil Jansrud of Norway, season champion; 2017 Men's World Cup; Overall • Downhill • Super-G; Giant slalom • Slalom • Combined
Previous: 2016	Next: 2018

The men's super-G in the 2017 Alpine Skiing World Cup involved six events, including the finals in Aspen, Colorado (USA). Although Norwegian skier Aleksander Aamodt Kilde was the defending champion in the discipline, fellow Norwegian (and 2015 discipline champion) Kjetil Jansrud won the first three Super-G races of the season. With only six events in the discipline, Jansrud then clinched the season championship before the finals merely by finishing seventh in the fifth Super-G of the year in Kvitfjell, Norway.

The season was interrupted by the 2017 World Ski Championships, which were held from 6–20 February in St. Moritz, Switzerland. The men's super-G was held on 8 February.

== Standings ==
Rank	Name	2 Dec 2016; Val d'Isère (France)	16 Dec 2016; Val Gardena/Gröden (Italy)	27 Dec 2016; Santa Caterina (Italy)	20 Jan 2017; Kitzbühel (Austria)	26 Feb 2017; Kvitfjell (Norway)	16 Mar 2017; Aspen (United States)	Total
	(Norway) Kjetil Jansrud	100	100	100	29	36	29	394
2	(Austria) Hannes Reichelt	14	29	80	DSQ	80	100	303
3	(Norway) Aleksander Aamodt Kilde	9	80	50	50	50	60	299
4	(Italy) Dominik Paris	60	32	60	40	5	80	277
5	(Italy) Peter Fill	32	22	0	36	100	36	226
6	(Austria) Max Franz	26	36	45	45	16	22	190
7	(Austria) Matthias Mayer	8	50	9	100	22	DNF	189
8	(Switzerland) Beat Feuz	40	18	24	60	45	DNF	187
9	(Canada) Erik Guay	24	60	20	11	60	DNF	175
10	(Switzerland) Mauro Caviezel	0	0	36	10	29	60	135
11	(Slovenia) Boštjan Kline	45	16	20	9	32	DNF	122
12	(Italy) Christof Innerhofer	DNF	26	13	80	DNS		119
13	(Germany) Josef Ferstl	DNF	20	45	32	0	20	117
	(Austria) Vincent Kriechmayr	0	12	26	20	14	45	117
15	(United States) Travis Ganong	36	13	7	24	0	32	112
16	(Germany) Andreas Sander	29	45	15	3	18	DSQ	110
17	(Austria) Adrien Théaux	22	15	2	14	9	45	107
18	(Norway) Aksel Lund Svindal	80	DNF	DNS				80
	(Switzerland) Carlo Janka	50	8	DNF	22	0	DNF	80
20	(Canada) Manuel Osborne-Paradis	0	5	5	18	26	16	70
21	(Canada) Dustin Cook	20	40	8	DNF	0	DSQ	68
	(France) Alexis Pinturault	DNF	DNS	16	26	DNS	26	68
23	(France) Blaise Giezendanner	12	11	0	15	8	18	64
24	(Norway) Adrian Smiseth Sejersted	0	24	29	DNF	DNS		53
25	(Austria) Marcel Hirscher	20	DNS	0	7	DNS	24	51
26	(Slovenia) Martin Čater	0	10	0	DNF	40	0	50
27	(United States) Andrew Weibrecht	13	0	22	13	0	0	48
	References							

- Winner
- 2nd place
- 3rd place
- DNF = Did Not Finish
- DSQ = Disqualified
- DNS = Did Not Start
- Updated at 18 March 2017, after all events.

== See also ==
- 2017 Alpine Skiing World Cup – Men's summary rankings
- 2017 Alpine Skiing World Cup – Men's overall
- 2017 Alpine Skiing World Cup – Men's downhill
- 2017 Alpine Skiing World Cup – Men's giant slalom
- 2017 Alpine Skiing World Cup – Men's slalom
- 2017 Alpine Skiing World Cup – Men's combined
- World Cup scoring system
