= 2021 Alpine Skiing World Cup – Men's downhill =

Alpine ski discipline year standings

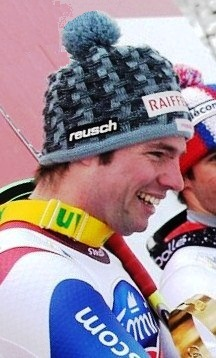
2021 Men's downhill World Cup: Beat Feuz of Switzerland, season champion; 2021 Men's World Cup; Overall • Downhill • Super-G; Giant slalom • Slalom • Parallel
| Previous: 2020 | Next: 2022 |

The men's downhill in the 2021 FIS Alpine Skiing World Cup consisted of seven events. The original schedule had contained nine downhills, but a rescheduled one on 5 March in Saalbach-Hinterglemm, Austria, was canceled due to fog and continual snowfall after just nine skiers had finished (with 30 needed to make the race official), and (as discussed below) the downhill during World Cup finals week was also canceled.

The first downhill of the season, conducted in good conditions in Val d'Isère, France, took an unusual turn when Martin Čater of Slovenia, starting 41st, unexpectedly recorded the winning time . . . eleven racers after the organizers had already held the unofficial podium ceremony and the television broadcasters had ended coverage. After that, the season returned to normal, and three=time defending champion Beat Feuz opened up a 48-point lead over his nearest rival, Matthias Mayer of Austria, with only three events to go. But then the first downhill at Saalbach-Hinterglemm was cancelled, Feuz gained 20 more points on Meyer at the second downhill there, and, at the World Cup final (scheduled for Wednesday, 17 March in Lenzerheide, Switzerland), three straight days of heavy snowfall caused the downhill finals to be cancelled. Thus Feuz, who had previously won two downhills on the Hahnenkamm in Kitzbühel during the season, won the discipline's crystal globe without a final showdown.

The season was interrupted by the 2021 World Ski Championships, which were held from 8–21 February in Cortina d'Ampezzo, Italy. The men's downhill took place on 14 February 2021.

== Standings ==
| Rank | Name | 13 Dec 2020; Val-d'Isère (France) | 19 Dec 2020; Val Gardena/Gröden (Italy) | 30 Dec 2020; Bormio (Italy) | 22 Jan 2021; Kitzbühel (Austria) | 24 Jan 2021; Kitzbühel (Austria) | 26 Feb 2021; Garmisch-Partenkirchen (Germany) | 5 Mar 2021; Saalbach-Hinterglemm (Austria) | 06 Mar 2021; Saalbach-Hinterglemm (Austria) | 17 Mar 2021; Lenzerheide (Switzerland) | Total |
| | (Switzerland) Beat Feuz | 40 | 60 | 26 | 100 | 100 | 80 | x | 80 | x | 486 |
| 2 | (Austria) Matthias Mayer | 32 | 26 | 100 | 80 | 60 | 60 | x | 60 | x | 418 |
| 3 | (Italy) Dominik Paris | 26 | 16 | 50 | 60 | 36 | 100 | x | 50 | x | 338 |
| 4 | (France) Johan Clarey | 45 | 13 | 29 | 50 | 80 | 26 | x | 29 | x | 272 |
| 5 | (Austria) Vincent Kriechmayr | 0 | 20 | 80 | 29 | 14 | 24 | x | 100 | x | 267 |
| 6 | (Germany) Romed Baumann | 29 | 32 | 18 | 32 | 45 | 18 | x | 22 | x | 196 |
| 7 | (Austria) Otmar Striedinger | 80 | 1 | 7 | 20 | 32 | 15 | x | 36 | x | 191 |
| 8 | (Norway) Aleksander Aamodt Kilde | 50 | 100 | 40 | DNS | | | | | | 190 |
| 9 | (Austria) Max Franz | 22 | 29 | 20 | DNF | 20 | 50 | x | 45 | x | 186 |
| 10 | (Germany) Andreas Sander | 36 | 15 | 12 | 45 | 40 | 7 | x | 6 | x | 161 |
| 11 | (France) Matthieu Bailet | 10 | 9 | 32 | 36 | 29 | 14 | x | 24 | x | 154 |
| 12 | (Italy) Christof Innerhofer | 0 | 3 | 24 | 9 | 50 | 45 | x | 10 | x | 141 |
| 13 | (Switzerland) Carlo Janka | 13 | 36 | DNF | 40 | 1 | 40 | x | 7 | x | 137 |
| 14 | (United States) Ryan Cochran-Siegle | 20 | 80 | 36 | DNF | DNS | | | | | 136 |
| 15 | (Switzerland) Urs Kryenbühl | 60 | 7 | 60 | 6 | DNS | | | | | 133 |
| 16 | (Switzerland) Marco Odermatt | 1 | DNS | 22 | DNS | 26 | 32 | x | 45 | x | 126 |
| 17 | (Slovenia) Martin Čater | 100 | 6 | DNS | 5 | 0 | 0 | x | 0 | x | 111 |
| 18 | (United States) Travis Ganong | 8 | 18 | 0 | 22 | 24 | 36 | x | 0 | x | 108 |
| 19 | (United States) Bryce Bennett | 7 | 50 | DNF | 7 | 0 | 10 | x | 26 | x | 100 |
| 20 | (Norway) Kjetil Jansrud | 11 | 50 | DNS | 13 | 5 | 20 | x | 0 | x | 99 |
| 21 | (France) Nils Allègre | 24 | 24 | DNF | 26 | 12 | 12 | x | 0 | x | 98 |
| 22 | (Austria) Daniel Hemetsberger | 2 | 5 | 9 | DNS | 26 | 29 | x | 15 | x | 86 |
| 23 | (United States) Jared Goldberg | 0 | 40 | 11 | 12 | 7 | 13 | x | 0 | x | 83 |
| 24 | (Switzerland) Mauro Caviezel | 15 | 22 | 45 | DNS | | | | | | 82 |
| 25 | (Germany) Dominik Schwaiger | 10 | 0 | 1 | 22 | 14 | 22 | x | 0 | x | 69 |
| | References | | | | | | | | | | |

- Winner
- 2nd place
- 3rd place
- DNF = Did not finish
- DNS = Did not start
- Updated at 17 March 2021, after all events.

== See also ==
- 2021 Alpine Skiing World Cup – Men's summary rankings
- 2021 Alpine Skiing World Cup – Men's overall
- 2021 Alpine Skiing World Cup – Men's super-G
- 2021 Alpine Skiing World Cup – Men's giant slalom
- 2021 Alpine Skiing World Cup – Men's slalom
- 2021 Alpine Skiing World Cup – Men's parallel
- World Cup scoring system
