= 2021 Alpine Skiing World Cup – Men's slalom =

Alpine ski discipline year standings

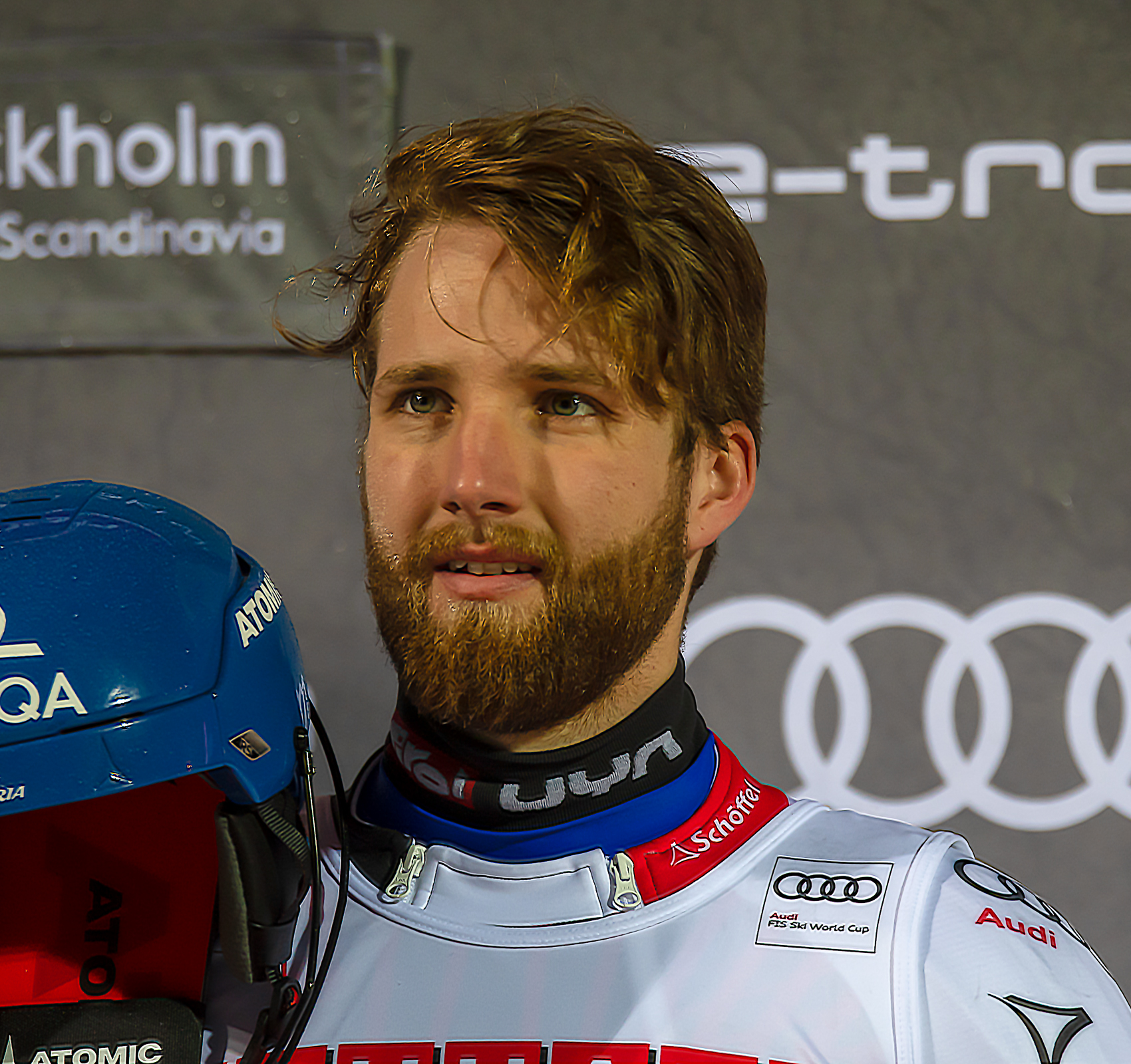
2021 Men's slalom World Cup: Marco Schwarz of Austria, season champion; 2021 Men's World Cup; Overall • Downhill • Super-G; Giant slalom • Slalom • Parallel
Previous: 2020	Next: 2022

The men's slalom in the 2021 FIS Alpine Skiing World Cup involved 11 events including the final, exactly as scheduled without any cancellations.

Austrian skier Marco Schwarz jumped out to a huge lead in the standings; after winning the night slalom in Schlamding. Austria, Schwarz had over a 200-point lead on the field. From there, Schwarz just needed to stay healthy to record an easy victory, and he clinched the discipline title for 2021 (and the crystal globe that goes with it) after the tenth event.

The finals were held on 21 March 2021 in Lenzerheide, Switzerland; only the top 25 in the discipline ranking, the winner of the Junior World Championship, and athletes who have scored at least 500 points in the overall classification were eligible to participate, and only the top 15 scored points.

The season was interrupted by the 2021 World Ski Championships, which were held from 8–21 February in Cortina d'Ampezzo, Italy. The men's slalom was held on 21 February 2021.

== Standings ==
#	Skier	21 Dec 2020; Alta Badia (Italy)	22 Dec 2020; Madonna di Campiglio (Italy)	06 Jan 2021; Zagreb (Croatia)	10 Jan 2021; Adelboden (Switzerland)	16 Jan 2021; Flachau (Austria)	17 Jan 2021; Flachau (Austria)	26 Jan 2021; Schladming (Austria)	30 Jan 2021; Chamonix (France)	31 Jan 2021; Chamonix (France)	14 Mar 2021; Kranjska Gora (Slovenia)	21 Mar 2021; Lenzerheide (Switzerland)	Total
	(Austria) Marco Schwarz	60	29	60	100	60	80	100	60	40	36	40	665
2	(France) Clément Noël	DNQ	45	36	32	80	DNF1	80	100	DNQ	100	80	553
3	(Switzerland) Ramon Zenhäusern	100	20	29	20	40	29	45	80	80	60	DNF2	503
4	(Austria) Manuel Feller	80	50	80	DNF1	100	14	DNF2	DNF2	28	40	100	488
5	(Norway) Sebastian Foss-Solevåg	29	80	20	29	50	100	50	29	18	26	DNF1	431
6	(Norway) Henrik Kristoffersen	40	100	26	DNF2	13	36	24	DNF1	100	45	22	406
7	(France) Alexis Pinturault	24	40	13	14	29	60	60	32	32	DNF2	60	364
8	(Germany) Linus Strasser	13	40	100	80	45	DNF1	DNF2	14	8	18	29	347
9	(Switzerland) Loïc Meillard	20	24	DNF1	45	24	50	29	4	DNF1	50	45	327
10	(France) Victor Muffat-Jeandet	45	DNF2	40	0	20	13	10	20	50	80	32	310
11	(Austria) Michael Matt	16	15	50	50	11	26	DNF2	45	15	DNF2	DNF2	228
12	(United Kingdom) Dave Ryding	26	10	4	60	36	22	16	24	DNF2	5	18	221
13	(Italy) Alex Vinatzer	50	60	DNF1	DNF1	DNF1	DNF2	DNQ	2	20	32	50	214
14	(Switzerland) Luca Aerni	14	DNQ	DNQ	11	32	40	DNQ	50	14	DNF2	36	197
15	(Austria) Adrian Pertl	18	14	DNF1	24	16	6	26	20	50	14	DNF2	188
16	(Switzerland) Daniel Yule	36	9	26	36	DNF1	9	DNF1	16	13	24	DNF1	169
17	(Austria) Fabio Gstrein	10	22	32	DNF1	18	45	DNQ	6	5	29	DNF1	167
18	(Switzerland) Tanguy Nef	32	13	DNF2	40	26	DNF2	11	10	DNF1	DNF1	26	158
19	(Russia) Alexander Khoroshilov	DNF1	20	18	26	DNF1	DNF2	36	36	DNF2	10	0	146
	(France) Jean-Baptiste Grange	7	40	DNF2	12	DNQ	12	22	11	22	20	DNF2	146
21	(Sweden) Kristoffer Jakobsen	22	26	0	15	DNF2	32	DNF1	8	26	16	DNF1	145
22	(Slovenia) Stefan Hadalin	11	5	15	16	14	8	8	22	16	6	18	139
23	(Italy) Manfred Mölgg	12	16	DNQ	18	DNF2	20	32	3	32	DNF1	DNF1	133
24	(Croatia) Filip Zubčić	5	11	45	DNF1	7	DNQ	DSQ2	16	6	22	20	132
25	(Austria) Christian Hirschbühl	9	13	DNF1	22	22	DNF1	DNF1	26	DNQ	DNF2	24	116
	References												

- Winner
- 2nd place
- 3rd place
- DNQ = Did not qualify for run 2
- DNF1 = Did not finish run 1
- DNF2 = Did not finish run 2
- DSQ1 = Disqualified run 1
- DSQ2 = Disqualified run 2

Updated at 21 March 2021 after all events.

== See also ==
- 2021 Alpine Skiing World Cup – Men's summary rankings
- 2021 Alpine Skiing World Cup – Men's overall
- 2021 Alpine Skiing World Cup – Men's downhill
- 2021 Alpine Skiing World Cup – Men's super-G
- 2021 Alpine Skiing World Cup – Men's giant slalom
- 2021 Alpine Skiing World Cup – Men's parallel
- World Cup scoring system
