= 2021 Alpine Skiing World Cup – Men's overall =

Alpine ski discipline year standings

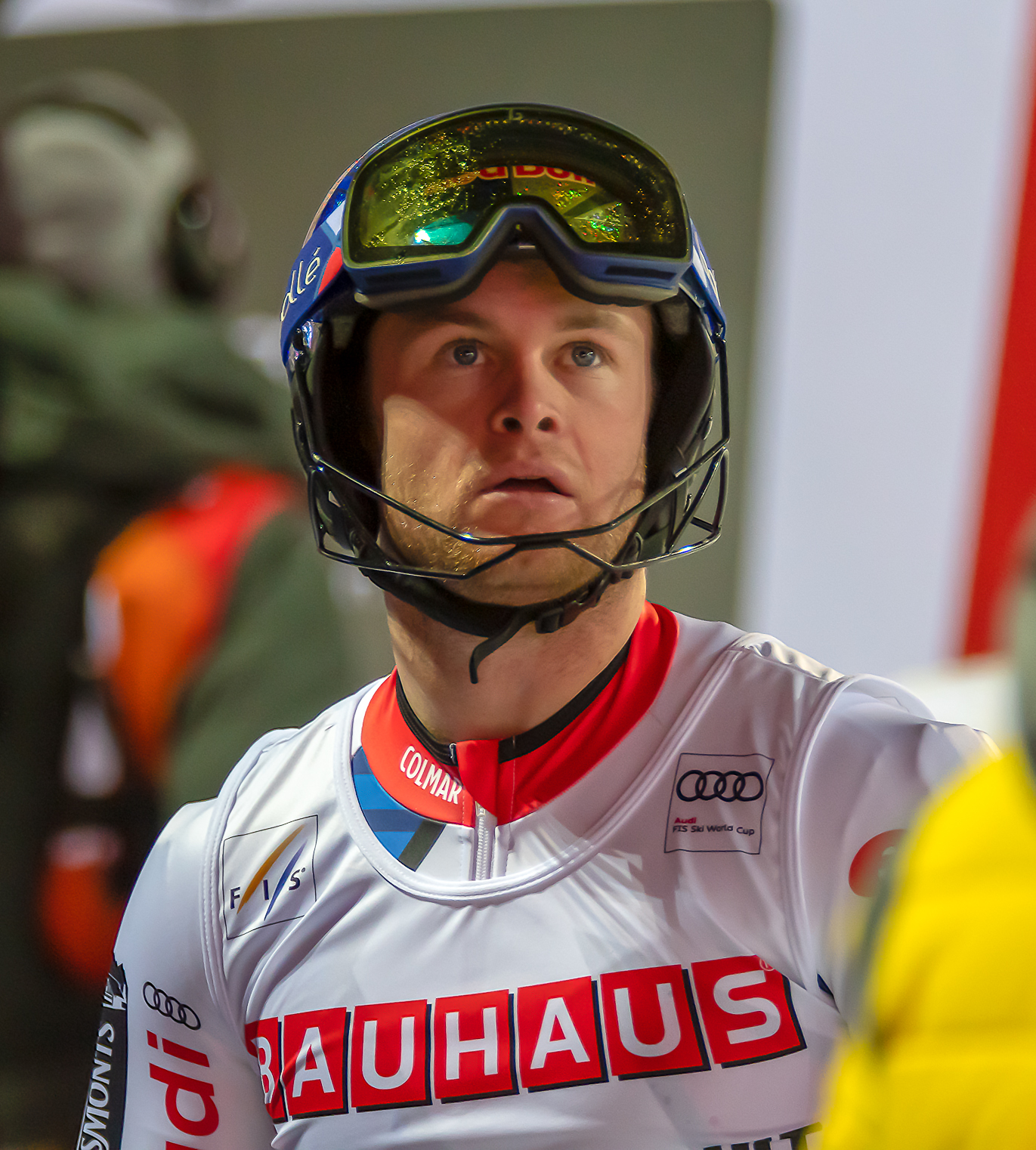
2021 men's overall World Cup: Alexis Pinturault of France, season champion; 2021 men's World Cup; Overall • downhill • super-g; giant slalom • slalom • parallel
Previous: 2020	Next: 2022

The men's overall in the 2021 FIS Alpine Skiing World Cup consisted of 35 events in 5 disciplines: downhill, Super-G, giant slalom, slalom, and parallel. The sixth discipline, Alpine combined, had all three of its events in the 2020–21 season cancelled. The tentative season schedule contained 43 events (plus two team parallel events, including one at the season finals), but the final schedule cut the season back to 38 events (and one team parallel event at the season finals). The continuing danger of the COVID-19 pandemic caused the three Alpine combineds (Bormio, Wengen, Bansko) to be canceled in order to keep the speed skiers and the technical skiers separated during the season; additionally, two of the three parallels (Alta Badia, Chamonix) and the second team parallel (Lech/Zürs) were canceled so that other events could take their place and reduce travel. Ultimately, only three of those final 38 races were canceled -- two downhills and a Super-G -- and two of those were canceled by snowstorms during World Cup finals week, as discussed below.

In the next-to-last event during the season finals, French skier Alexis Pinturault clinched the overall season championship and the crystal globe that goes with it.

In addition to the disruption resulting from the continuing COVID-19 pandemic, the season was interrupted by the 2021 World Ski Championships, which were held from 8–21 February in Cortina d'Ampezzo, Italy.

The last four events of the season were scheduled to take place at the final, Wednesday, 17 March through Sunday, 21 March in Lenzerheide, Switzerland. Only the top 25 in each specific discipline for the season and the winner of the Junior World Championship are eligible to compete in the final, with the exception that athletes who have scored at least 500 points in the overall classification are eligible to participate in any discipline, regardless of standing in that discipline for the season. However, on 17 March, the downhill final had to be cancelled after three days of heavy snowfall. On 18 March, the Super-G final was also cancelled, eliminating events in which runner-up Marco Odermatt of Switzerland had a perceived edge over Pinturault. When Pinturault won the giant slalom held on 20 March, he gained an insurmountable lead over Odermatt.

== Standings ==
#	Skier	DH; 7 races	SG; 6 races	GS; 10 races	SL; 11 races	PAR; 1 race	Total
	(France) Alexis Pinturault	0	96	700	364	100	1,260
2	(Switzerland) Marco Odermatt	126	318	649	0	0	1,093
3	(Austria) Marco Schwarz	0	0	149	665	0	814
4	(Switzerland) Loïc Meillard	0	85	393	327	0	805
5	(Croatia) Filip Zubčić	0	0	606	132	26	764
6	(Norway) Henrik Kristoffersen	0	0	236	406	80	722
7	(Austria) Matthias Mayer	418	276	6	0	0	700
8	(Austria) Vincent Kriechmayr	267	401	7	0	0	675
9	(Switzerland) Beat Feuz	486	121	0	0	0	607
10	(Austria) Manuel Feller	0	0	107	488	0	595
11	(Norway) Aleksander Aamodt Kilde	190	172	180	0	18	560
12	(France) Clément Noël	0	0	1	553	0	554
13	(Switzerland) Ramon Zenhäusern	0	0	0	503	0	503
14	(Norway) Sebastian Foss-Solevåg	0	0	0	431	0	431
15	(Italy) Dominik Paris	338	88	0	0	0	426
16	(France) Mathieu Faivre	0	0	378	0	26	404
17	(France) Victor Muffat-Jeandet	0	0	62	310	0	372
18	(Germany) Linus Straßer	0	0	0	347	2	349
19	(France) Johan Clarey	272	63	0	0	0	335
20	(Germany) Andreas Sander	161	169	0	0	0	330
21	(Switzerland) Gino Caviezel	0	64	215	0	40	319
22	(Switzerland) Mauro Caviezel	82	225	0	0	0	307
	(United States) Ryan Cochran-Siegle	136	132	39	0	0	307
24	(Germany) Romed Baumann	196	103	0	0	0	299
25	(Austria) Max Franz	186	90	0	0	0	276

- Leader
- 2nd place
- 3rd place
- Updated at 21 March 2021, after all events

== See also ==
- 2021 Alpine Skiing World Cup – Men's summary rankings
- 2021 Alpine Skiing World Cup – Men's downhill
- 2021 Alpine Skiing World Cup – Men's super-G
- 2021 Alpine Skiing World Cup – Men's giant slalom
- 2021 Alpine Skiing World Cup – Men's slalom
- 2021 Alpine Skiing World Cup – Men's parallel
- 2021 Alpine Skiing World Cup – Women's overall
- World Cup scoring system
