= 2017 Alpine Skiing World Cup – Men's downhill =

Alpine ski discipline year standings

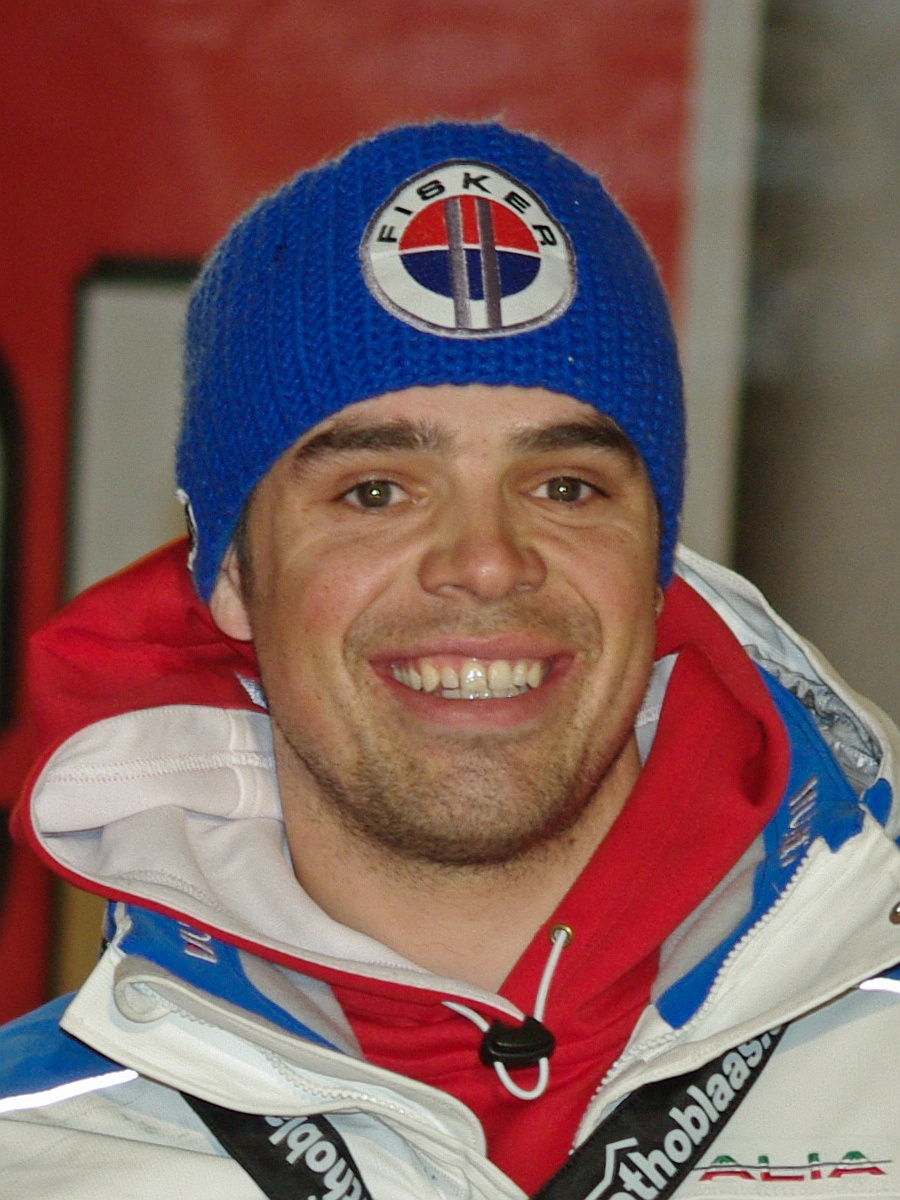
2017 Men's downhill World Cup: Peter Fill of Italy, season champion; 2017 Men's World Cup; Overall • Downhill • Super-G; Giant slalom • Slalom • Combined
Previous: 2016	Next: 2018

The men's downhill in the 2017 FIS Alpine Skiing World Cup involved eight events, including the season finale in Aspen, Colorado (USA). Due to difficult weather conditions, only two downhills were held during the first twenty events of the 2016-17 World Cup season, meaning that six were held during the final sixteen events. Defending discipline champion Peter Fill of Italy, who did not win a downhill all season, went into the finals trailing Norway's Kjetil Jansrud by 33 points, but he finished second in the finals (80 points) while Jansrud finished 11th (24 points), thus permitting Fill to repeat as downhill season champion by 23 points despite not recording a win.

The season was interrupted by the 2017 World Ski Championships, which were held from 6–20 February in St. Moritz, Switzerland. The men's downhill was scheduled to be held on 11 February but was delayed a day by poor visibility due to fog, finally being held on 12 February.

== Standings ==
Rank	Name	3 Dec 2016; Val d'Isère (France)	17 Dec 2016; Val Gardena/Gröden (Italy)	21 Jan 2017; Kitzbühel (Austria)	27 Jan 2017; Garmisch-Partenkirchen (Germany)	28 Jan 2017; Garmisch-Partenkirchen (Germany)	24 Feb 2017; Kvitfjell (Norway)	25 Feb 2017; Kvitfjell (Norway)	15 Mar 2017; Aspen (United States)	Total
	(Italy) Peter Fill	80	9	50	60	80	15	80	80	454
2	(Norway) Kjetil Jansrud	100	22	0	80	45	60	100	24	431
3	(Italy) Dominik Paris	36	6	100	26	50	24	29	100	371
4	(Switzerland) Beat Feuz	20	18	DNF	45	60	36	60	20	259
5	(Canada) Erik Guay	40	45	40	DNF	DNS	50	40	40	255
6	(Austria) Hannes Reichelt	7	14	29	50	100	29	24	0	253
7	(Switzerland) Carlo Janka	26	11	45	29	8	16	45	60	240
8	(Austria) Matthias Mayer	14	14	32	32	18	80	15	32	237
9	(France) Adrien Théaux	45	50	36	7	32	9	9	45	233
10	(Slovenia) Boštjan Kline	50	0	4	DNF	40	100	36	DNF	230
11	(Canada) Manuel Osborne-Paradis	6	14	12	40	3	45	50	50	220
12	(United States) Travis Ganong	9	36	2	100	22	32	14	0	215
13	(Norway) Aleksander Aamodt Kilde	29	40	7	DNF	26	22	32	22	178
14	(Austria) Vincent Kriechmayr	13	4	24	20	36	8	26	29	160
15	(Norway) Aksel Lund Svindal	60	80	DNS						140
16	(Austria) Max Franz	10	100	DNF	8	13	8	0	0	139
17	(France) Johan Clarey	22	10	60	9	1	0	4	26	132
18	(Germany) Andreas Sander	0	0	20	18	16	14	20	40	128
19	(Austria) Romed Baumann	11	24	5	36	26	5	11	0	118
20	(Switzerland) Patrick Küng	36	18	0	24	20	0	0	16	114
21	(France) Valentin Giraud Moine	26	0	80	DNF	DNS				126
22	(United States) Steven Nyman	16	60	26	DNF	DNS				102
23	(France) Guillermo Fayed	18	26	15	DNF	DNS	10	8	18	95
24	(Switzerland) Mauro Caviezel	DNF	3	DNS	14	15	26	16	DNF	74
25	(Germany) Thomas Dreßen	0	5	DNF	0	0	40	24	0	69
	References									

- Winner
- 2nd place
- 3rd place
- DNF = Did Not Finish
- DNS = Did Not Start
- Updated at 19 March 2017, after all events.

== See also ==
- 2017 Alpine Skiing World Cup – Men's summary rankings
- 2017 Alpine Skiing World Cup – Men's overall
- 2017 Alpine Skiing World Cup – Men's super-G
- 2017 Alpine Skiing World Cup – Men's giant slalom
- 2017 Alpine Skiing World Cup – Men's slalom
- 2017 Alpine Skiing World Cup – Men's combined
- World Cup scoring system
