= 2017 Alpine Skiing World Cup – Men's giant slalom =

Alpine ski discipline year standings

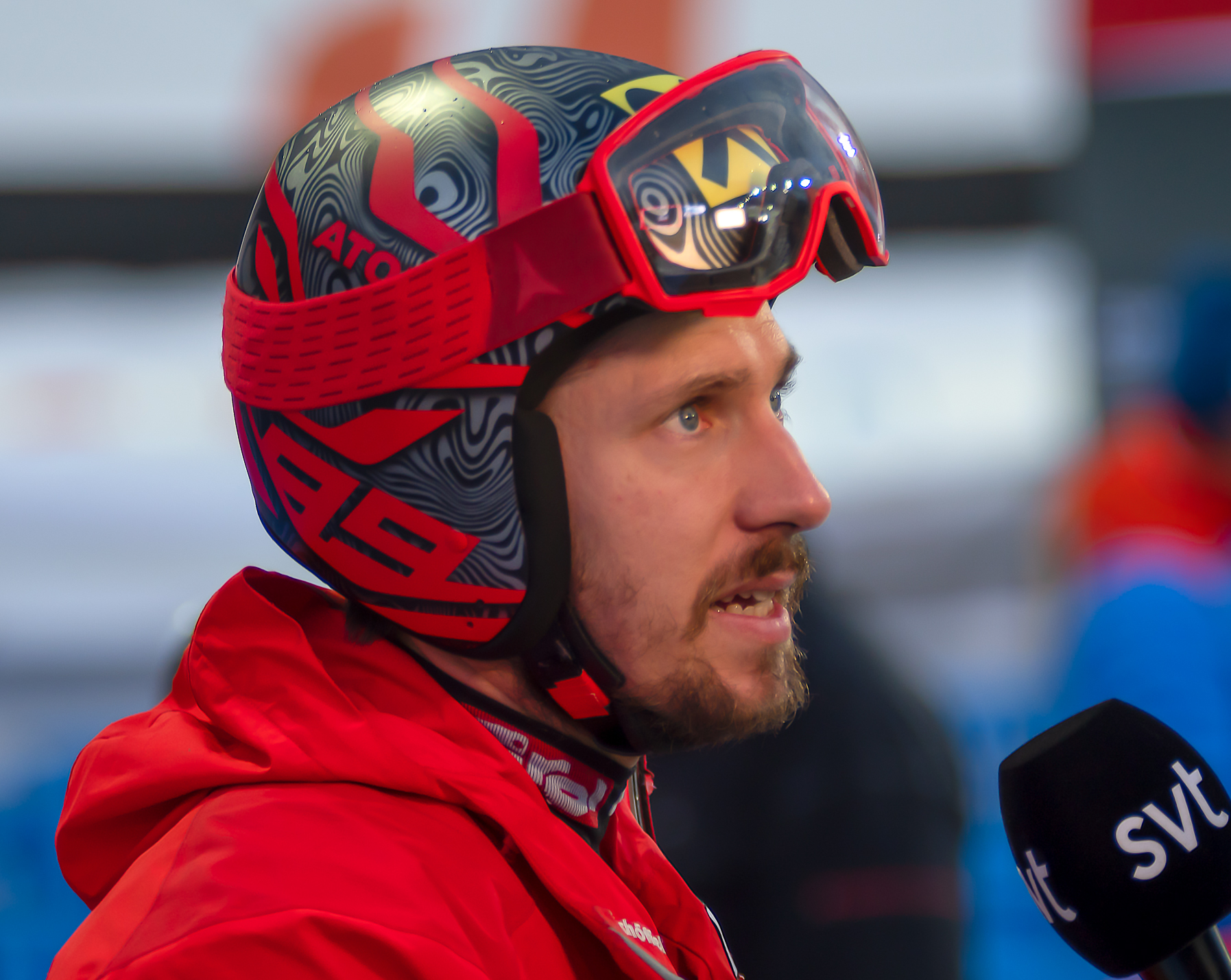
2017 Men's Giant slalom World Cup: Marcel Hirscher of Austria, season champion; 2017 Men's World Cup; Overall • Downhill • Super-G; Giant slalom • Slalom • Combined
Previous: 2016	Next: 2018

The men's giant slalom in the 2017 FIS Alpine Skiing World Cup involved nine events, including the second-ever parallel giant slalom (again in Alta Badia) and the season finals in Aspen, Colorado (USA). Marcel Hirscher of Austria won four of the races this season and finished second in four others, easily winning the discipline for the third straight season on his way to his sixth straight overall World Cup championship. Hirscher was so dominant during the season (winning the discipline by almost 300 points) that much of the focus in the news coverage by the end of the season was about his desire to continue, considering the pressure on him to win (especially in his native Austria).

The season was interrupted by the 2017 World Ski Championships, which were held from 6–20 February in St. Moritz, Switzerland. The men's giant slalom was held on 17 February.

== Standings ==
Parallel giant slalom (PG)

#	Skier	23 Oct 2016; Sölden (Austria)	4 Dec 2016; Val d'Isère (France)	10 Dec 2016; Val d'Isère (France)	18 Dec 2016; Alta Badia (Italy)	19 Dec 2016; Alta Badia (PG) (Italy)	7 Jan 2017; Adelboden (Switzerland)	29 Jan 2017; Garmisch-Partenkirchen (Germany)	4 Mar 2017; Kranjska Gora (Slovenia)	18 Mar 2017; Aspen (Sweden)	Tot.
	(Austria) Marcel Hirscher	80	80	80	100	13	80	100	100	100	733
2	(France) Mathieu Faivre	29	100	29	80	32	45	45	20	60	440
3	(France) Alexis Pinturault	100	60	100	DNF2	29	100	50	DNF1	DNF2	439
4	(Germany) Felix Neureuther	60	15	50	40	8	32	40	45	80	370
5	(Norway) Henrik Kristoffersen	32	32	60	32	26	50	36	24	36	328
6	(Norway) Leif Kristian Haugen	13	14	36	12	50	24	24	80	29	282
7	(Germany) Stefan Luitz	12	DNQ	45	29	40	DNF1	60	45	50	281
8	(Sweden) Matts Olsson	16	DNF1	DNQ	9	14	40	80	60	45	264
9	(Italy) Florian Eisath	10	11	14	60	18	29	29	36	45	252
10	(Austria) Philipp Schörghofer	9	36	40	DNF1	24	60	DNF1	15	DNF2	184
11	(Italy) Luca De Aliprandini	26	40	8	36	9	3	26	DNS	24	172
12	(France) Victor Muffat-Jeandet	18	45	DNF2	10	16	36	10	18	16	169
13	(Switzerland) Justin Murisier	36	16	DNF2	26	2	DNF1	32	22	20	154
14	(Slovenia) Žan Kranjec	50	DNF2	DSQ3	50	20	16	8	8	0	152
15	(Sweden) Andre Myhrer	24	8	26	24	45	11	DNS	12	DNF2	150
16	(Austria) Manuel Feller	0	22	DNF1	45	15	13	DNF1	50	0	145
17	(France) Cyprien Sarrazin	0	DNS	7	4	100	DNF1	DNF1	4	26	141
18	(France) Steve Missillier	5	DNQ	22	22	22	22	14	DNF1	18	125
19	(Austria) Roland Leitinger	11	DNF2	24	16	4	DNQ	DNF2	29	32	116
20	(Switzerland) Carlo Janka	20	DNF2	11	DNF2	80	DNS	3	DNF1	0	114
21	(Italy) Manfred Mölgg	DNF2	6	20	14	10	20	12	DNF2	22	194
22	(Switzerland) Gino Caviezel	15	10	11	7	36	DNF1	13	DNF1	DNF1	92
23	(France) Thomas Fanara	40	50	DNS							90
24	(Norway) Kjetil Jansrud	DNF2	DNF1	DNS	DNQ	60	9	6	DNS	0	75
25	(United States) Tommy Ford	DNQ	18	DNF2	20	6	12	18	DNF2	0	74
	References										

- Winner
- 2nd place
- 3rd place
- DNS = Did not start
- DNF1 = Did not finish run 1
- DSQ1 = Disqualified run 1
- DNQ = Did not qualify for run 2
- DNF2 = Did not finish run 2
- DSQ2 = Disqualified run 2

Updated at 19 March 2017 after all events.

== See also ==
- 2017 Alpine Skiing World Cup – Men's summary rankings
- 2017 Alpine Skiing World Cup – Men's overall
- 2017 Alpine Skiing World Cup – Men's downhill
- 2017 Alpine Skiing World Cup – Men's super-G
- 2017 Alpine Skiing World Cup – Men's slalom
- 2017 Alpine Skiing World Cup – Men's combined
