= 2017 Alpine Skiing World Cup – Men's slalom =

Alpine Ski discipline year standings

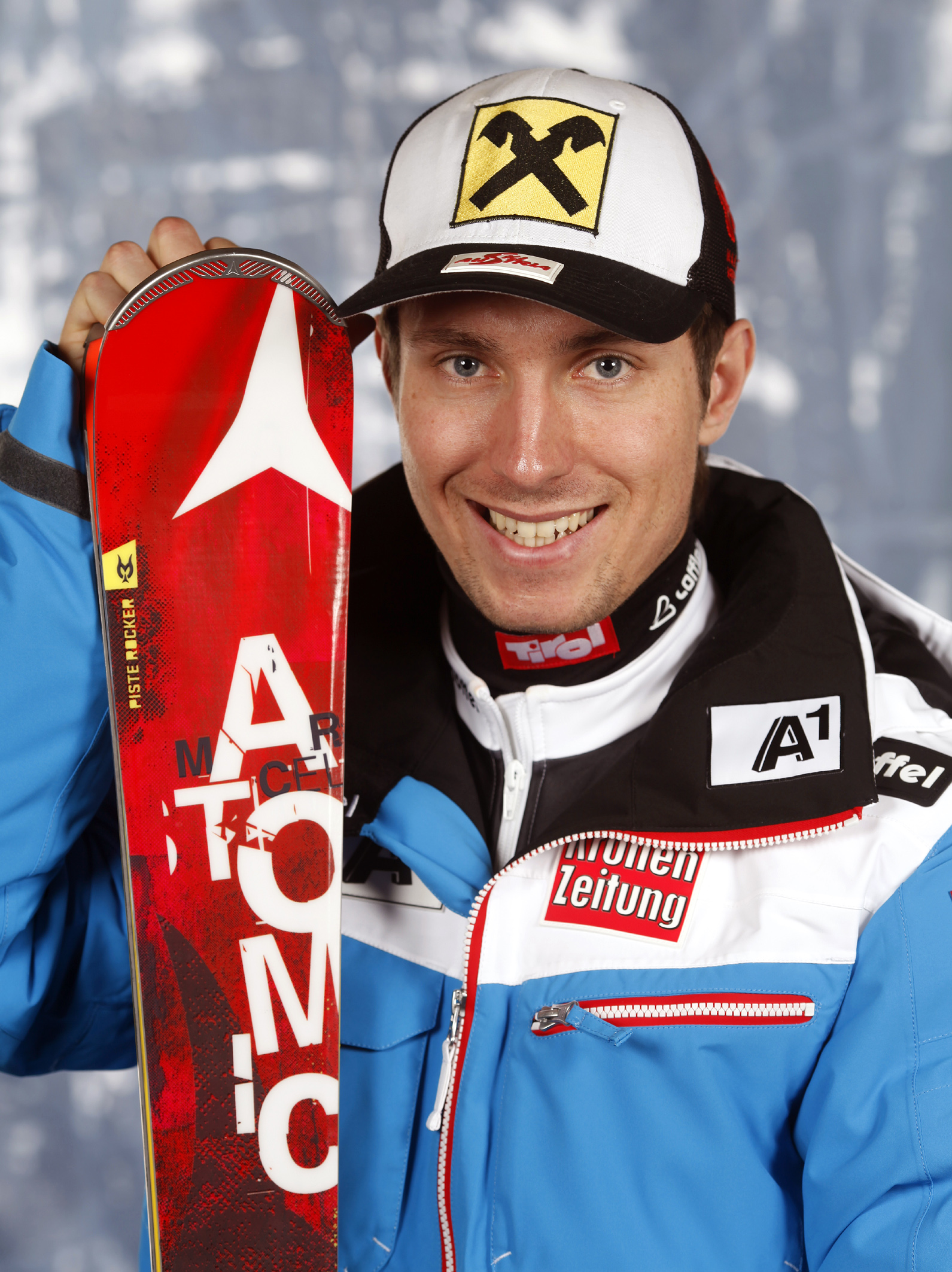
2017 Men's slalom World Cup: Marcel Hirscher of Austria, season champion; 2017 Men's World Cup; Overall • Downhill • Super-G; Giant slalom • Slalom • Combined
| Previous: 2016 | Next: 2018 |

The men's slalom in the 2017 FIS Alpine Skiing World Cup involved 11 events, including one parallel slalom (specifically, a city event, which only includes 16 racers). The last race of the season was at the World Cup finals in Aspen, and Marcel Hirscher of Austria won his fourth championship in the discipline, all in the prior five years, on the way to his sixth straight overall men's championship.

Hirscher clinched the title with a fourth-place finish in the next-to-last race at Kranjska Gora, which gave him a 110-point lead over Henrik Kristoffersen of Norway in the discipline with just 100 points left to win.

The season was interrupted by the 2017 World Ski Championships, which were held from 6–20 February in St. Moritz, Switzerland. The men's slalom was held on 19 February.

== Standings ==
Parallel slalom (PS) or City Event (CE)

| # | Skier | 13 Nov 2016; Levi (Finland) | 11 Dec 2016; Val d'Isère (France) | 22 Dec 2016; Madonna di Campiglio (Italy) | 5 Jan 2017; Zagreb (Croatia) | 8 Jan 2017; Adelboden (Switzerland) | 15 Jan 2017; Wengen (Switzerland) | 22 Jan 2017; Kitzbühel (Austria) | 24 Jan 2017; Schladming (Austria) | 31 Jan 2017; Stockholm (CE) (Sweden) | 5 Mar 2017; Kranjska Gora (Slovenia) | 19 Mar 2017; Aspen (United States) | Total |
| | (Austria) Marcel Hirscher | 100 | 80 | 80 | 40 | 60 | 80 | 100 | 80 | 15 | 50 | 50 | 735 |
| 2 | (Norway) Henrik Kristoffersen | DNS | 100 | 100 | 60 | 100 | 100 | DNF1 | 100 | 15 | DNQ | 0 | 575 |
| 3 | (Italy) Manfred Mölgg | 60 | 36 | 50 | 100 | 80 | 32 | DNF1 | 22 | 15 | 36 | 45 | 476 |
| 4 | (Germany) Felix Neureuther | 50 | DNF2 | DNF1 | 80 | 50 | 60 | 40 | DNF2 | DNS | 60 | 80 | 420 |
| 5 | (Austria) Michael Matt | 80 | 40 | 24 | 45 | DNF1 | DNQ | 6 | 12 | 15 | 100 | 60 | 382 |
| 6 | (Russia) Alexander Khoroshilov | DNQ | 60 | 9 | DNF2 | 45 | 36 | 60 | 60 | 40 | 26 | 36 | 372 |
| 7 | (Italy) Stefano Gross | DNF1 | 45 | 60 | 26 | DNF1 | 20 | DNF2 | 45 | 40 | 80 | 29 | 345 |
| 8 | (United Kingdom) Dave Ryding | 40 | 14 | 22 | 36 | 16 | 22 | 80 | 26 | 50 | DNF1 | 32 | 338 |
| 9 | (Sweden) André Myhrer | DSQ1 | 32 | 45 | 22 | 40 | DNF2 | DNF1 | DNS | | 45 | 100 | 284 |
| 10 | (Sweden) Mattias Hargin | 40 | 29 | 12 | DNQ | DNF1 | 40 | DNF1 | 29 | 60 | 20 | 40 | 270 |
| 11 | (Switzerland) Daniel Yule | 12 | 24 | 40 | 50 | 32 | 9 | 45 | 16 | 15 | DNF1 | 16 | 259 |
| 12 | (France) Alexis Pinturault | 24 | DNF2 | 36 | DNF2 | 29 | 24 | 26 | 32 | 80 | 6 | 0 | 257 |
| 13 | (France) Julien Lizeroux | 7 | 11 | 20 | 29 | DNQ | 45 | DNF2 | 50 | 15 | 32 | 24 | 233 |
| 14 | (Germany) Linus Straßer | 2 | 15 | 4 | 10 | 26 | 12 | DNF2 | 15 | 100 | 15 | 0 | 199 |
| 15 | (Switzerland) Luca Aerni | 32 | 22 | DNF2 | 32 | DNF1 | DNF1 | DNF1 | 8 | DNS | 20 | 26 | 140 |
| 16 | (Japan) Naoki Yuasa | DNQ | 26 | 32 | 13 | 18 | DNF2 | 12 | 36 | DNS | DNF2 | 0 | 137 |
| 17 | (Norway) Jonathan Nordbotten | 26 | 6 | DNF1 | 16 | 26 | DNQ | 29 | 10 | 15 | 5 | DNF1 | 133 |
| 18 | (Norway) Sebastian Foss-Solevåg | DNF1 | DNF1 | 7 | 24 | DNF1 | DNQ | 22 | 14 | 15 | 24 | 20 | 126 |
| 19 | (Italy) Giuliano Razzoli | DNQ | 12 | DNQ | DNF2 | 3 | 13 | 24 | 9 | 40 | DNQ | 24 | 125 |
| 20 | (France) Jean-Baptiste Grange | 13 | 16 | 18 | DNF1 | 10 | 18 | 18 | DNF1 | DNS | 11 | 18 | 122 |
| 21 | (Austria) Manuel Feller | 45 | DNF2 | DNF1 | DNF2 | 36 | DSQ1 | DNF1 | 40 | DNS | DNF1 | 0 | 121 |
| 22 | (Italy) Patrick Thaler | 10 | 18 | 29 | DNQ | 14 | DNF2 | DNF1 | DNF2 | DNS | 40 | 0 | 111 |
| 23 | (Austria) Marco Schwarz | DNF2 | 8 | 26 | DNF2 | 20 | DNQ | 32 | 13 | DNS | 8 | 0 | 107 |
| 24 | (Norway) Leif Kristian Haugen | 22 | DNF2 | DNQ | DNQ | 2 | DNF2 | 50 | 24 | DNS | 4 | 0 | 102 |
| 25 | (Austria) Marc Digruber | 8 | 50 | 11 | DNF1 | 4 | 10 | 14 | DNF1 | DNS | 2 | 0 | 99 |
| | References | | | | | | | | | | | | |

Updated at 19 March 2017 after all events.

== See also ==
- 2017 Alpine Skiing World Cup – Men's summary rankings
- 2017 Alpine Skiing World Cup – Men's overall
- 2017 Alpine Skiing World Cup – Men's downhill
- 2017 Alpine Skiing World Cup – Men's super-G
- 2017 Alpine Skiing World Cup – Men's giant slalom
- 2017 Alpine Skiing World Cup – Men's combined
