= 2021 Alpine Skiing World Cup – Men's giant slalom =

Alpine ski discipline year standings

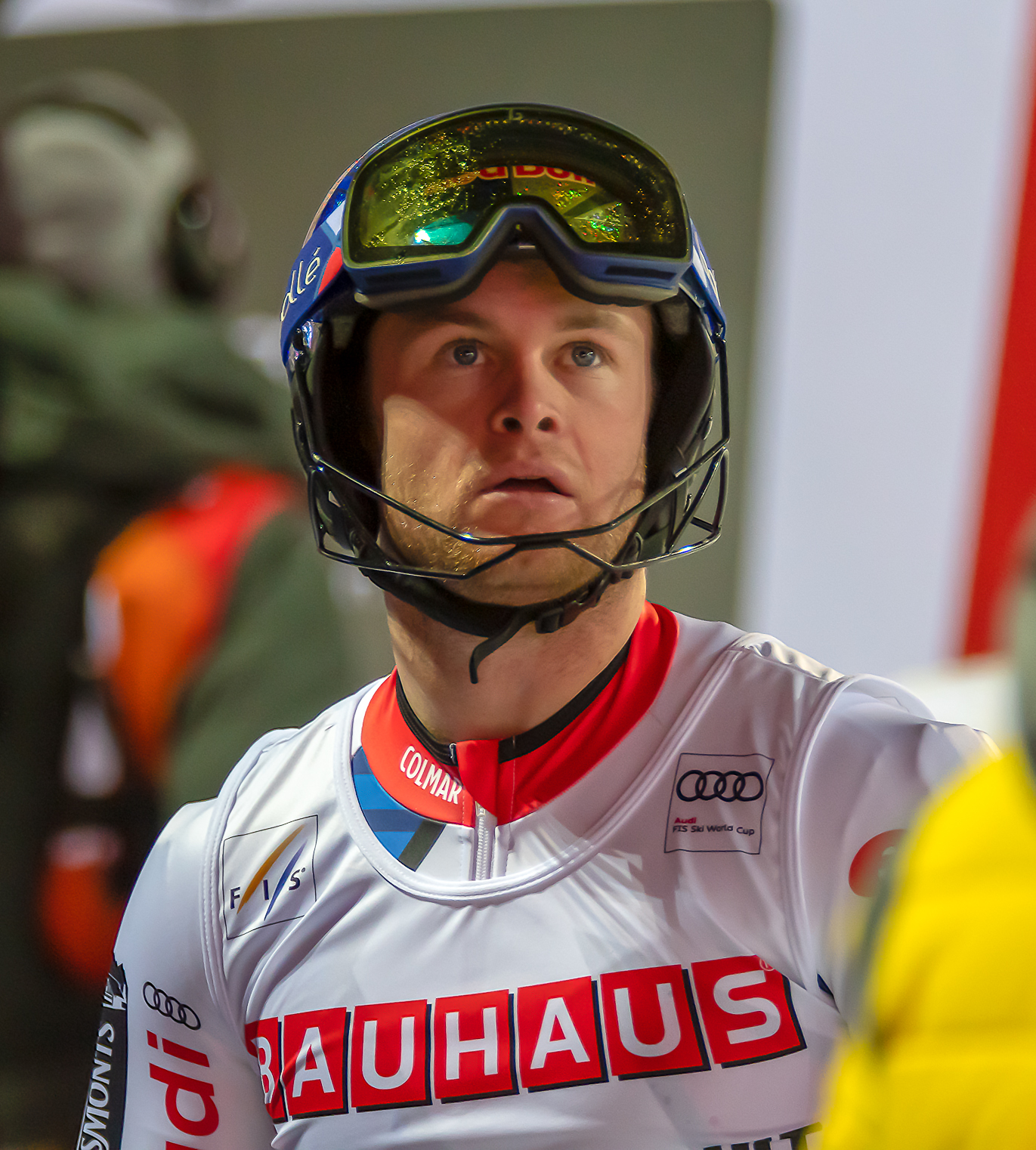
2021 Men's Giant slalom World Cup: Alexis Pinturault of France, season champion; 2021 Men's World Cup; Overall • Downhill • Super-G; Giant slalom • Slalom • Parallel
Previous: 2020	Next: 2022

The men's giant slalom in the 2021 FIS Alpine Skiing World Cup involved ten events, as scheduled.

Defending discipline champion Henrik Kristoffersen of Norway never seriously threatened to retain his title. Instead, the season-long race for the crystal globe turned into a two-man battle between 2020 runner-up Alexis Pinturault of France (who lost the previous year by six points after the last two giant slaloms of the year were canceled) and rising Swiss skier Marco Odermatt -- who were also battling each other for the overall championship. After Odermatt won the next-to-last race in Kranjska Gora, Slovenia, while Pintaurault finished fourth, Odermatt passed Pinturault and took a 25-point lead in the discipline with just the finals in Lenzerheide, Switzerland (where Odermatt would have a home advantage) remaining.

However, Pinturault himself then came from behind, winning the finals in Lenzerheide to pass Odermatt for the season championship in this discipline (and also to clinch the overall championship). This was Pinturault's first season title in giant slalom, becoming the first French champion in the discipline since 2002.

The season was interrupted by the 2021 World Ski Championships, which were held from 8–21 February in Cortina d'Ampezzo, Italy. The men's giant slalom was held on 19 February 2021.

== Standings ==
#	Skier	18 Oct 2020; Sölden (Austria)	5 Dec 2020; Santa Caterina (Italy)	7 Dec 2020; Santa Caterina (Italy)	20 Dec 2020; Alta Badia (Italy)	8 Jan 2021; Adelboden (Switzerland)	9 Jan 2021; Adelboden (Switzerland)	27 Feb 2021; Bansko (Bulgaria)	28 Feb 2021; Bansko (Bulgaria)	14 Mar 2021; Kranjska Gora (Slovenia)	21 Mar 2021; Lenzerheide (Switzerland)	Total
	(France) Alexis Pinturault	50	45	45	100	100	100	50	60	50	100	700
2	(Switzerland) Marco Odermatt	80	60	100	50	60	50	45	80	100	24	649
3	(Croatia) Filip Zubčić	22	100	60	26	80	80	100	18	40	80	606
4	(Switzerland) Loïc Meillard	45	50	50	DNQ	40	60	32	36	80	DNF1	393
5	(France) Mathieu Faivre	5	32	11	15	14	16	80	100	45	60	378
6	(Austria) Stefan Brennsteiner	14	DNQ	DNQ	32	-	5	60	45	60	50	266
7	(Slovenia) Žan Kranjec	36	80	12	29	DNS		22	40	9	22	250
8	(Norway) Henrik Kristoffersen	45	9	22	16	29	4	14	29	36	32	236
9	(France) Thibaut Favrot	29	DNF1	18	DNF1	8	29	36	50	22	40	232
10	(Switzerland) Justin Murisier	24	6	8	60	45	26	20	32	8	0	229
11	(Italy) Luca De Aliprandini	26	8	40	DNF1	18	40	13	22	16	45	228
12	(Switzerland) Gino Caviezel	60	DNF1	2	20	DNF1	36	10	22	29	36	215
13	(United States) Tommy Ford	9	40	80	45	26	DNF1	DNS				200
14	(Norway) Leif Kristian Nestvold-Haugen	32	22	36	14	32	DNF2	7	6	18	29	196
15	(Norway) Lucas Braathen	100	22	20	13	36	DNS					191
16	(Germany) Alexander Schmid	16	24	29	36	10	9	24	DNF2	24	16	188
17	(Norway) Aleksander Aamodt Kilde	DNF1	29	16	40	50	45	DNS				180
18	(Austria) Marco Schwarz	DNS	18	9	10	18	22	26	26	DNS	20	149
19	(Germany) Stefan Luitz	18	DNF2	14	22	DNS		18	12	26	26	136
20	(Canada) Erik Read	12	26	26	12	15	20	DNF1	DNQ	15	DNF2	126
21	(Norway) Atle Lie McGrath	DNQ	18	24	80	DNF1	DNS					120
22	(Austria) Roland Leitinger	DNF1	5	14	9	24	32	DNF1	15	20	DNF1	119
23	(Austria) Manuel Feller	DNS	DNF2	DNQ	DNF2	DNF1	24	40	11	32	0	107
24	(Slovakia) Adam Zampa	3	36	32	DNQ	DNQ	8	12	10	5	0	106
25	(Italy) Giovanni Borsotti	20	10	DNQ	DNQ	9	18	9	16	4	18	104
	References											

- Winner
- 2nd place
- 3rd place
- DNS = Did not start
- DNF1 = Did not finish run 1
- DNQ2 = Did not qualify for run 2
- DNF2 = Did not finish run 2

Updated at 20 March 2021 after all events.

== See also ==
- 2021 Alpine Skiing World Cup – Men's summary rankings
- 2021 Alpine Skiing World Cup – Men's overall
- 2021 Alpine Skiing World Cup – Men's downhill
- 2021 Alpine Skiing World Cup – Men's super-G
- 2021 Alpine Skiing World Cup – Men's slalom
- 2021 Alpine Skiing World Cup – Men's parallel
- World Cup scoring system
