= 2017 Alpine Skiing World Cup – Men's overall =

Alpine ski discipline year standings

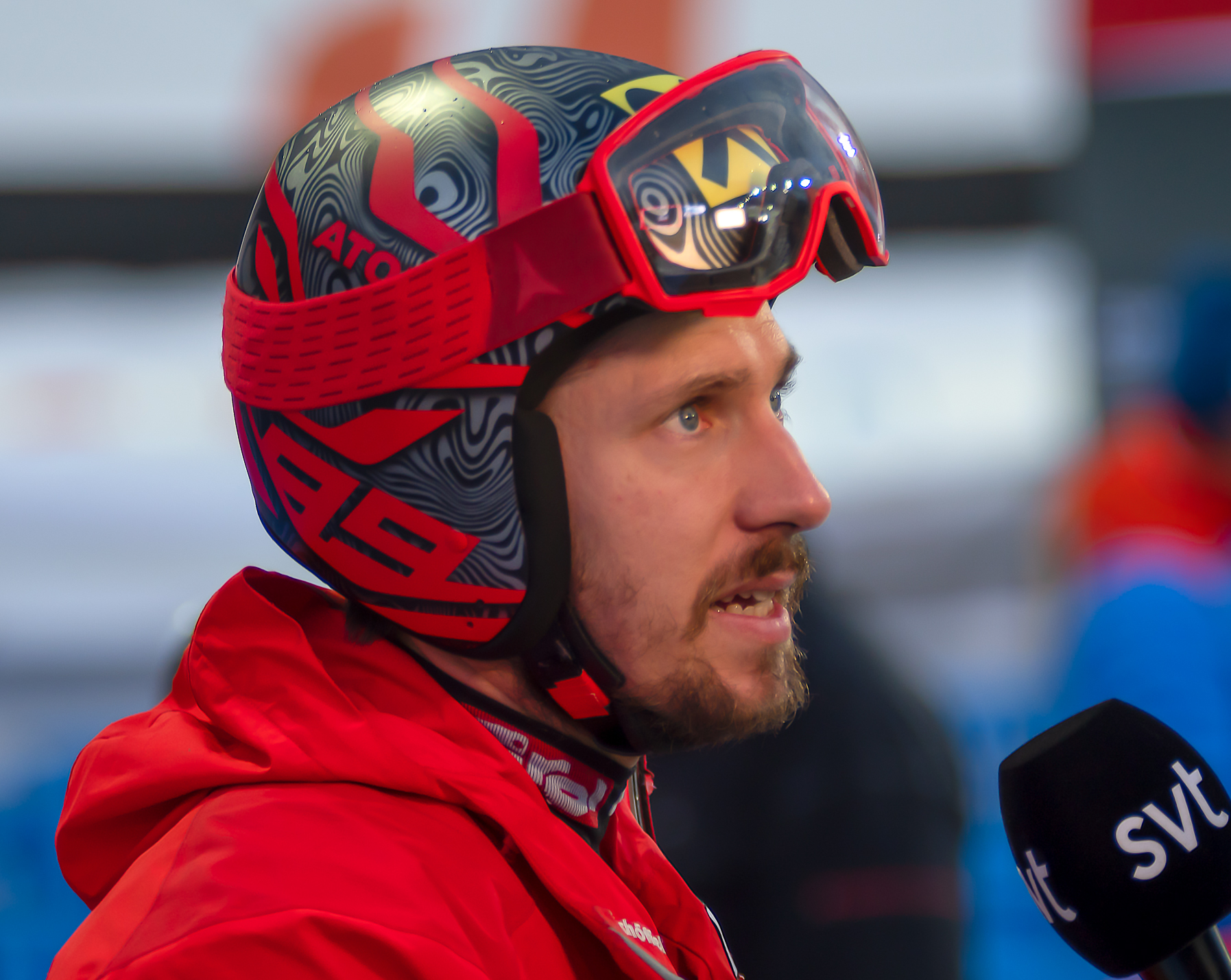
2017 men's overall World Cup: Marcel Hirscher of Austria, season champion; 2017 men's World Cup; Overall • downhill • super-g; giant slalom • slalom • combined
Previous: 2016	Next: 2018

The men's overall in the 2017 FIS Alpine Skiing World Cup involved 36 events in 5 disciplines: downhill (DH) (8 races), Super-G (SG) (6 races), giant slalom (GS) (9 races), slalom (SL) (11 races), and Alpine combined (AC) (2 races). Marcel Hirscher of Austria, 28 years old, won the overall title for the sixth consecutive time, tying one all-time record and breaking another. Hirscher tied the record for the most overall World Cup titles (six) held since 1979 by Annemarie Moser-Pröll, and broke the record for the most consecutive titles (five) also held by Moser-Pröll.

The season was interrupted by the 2017 World Ski Championships, which were held from 6–20 February in St. Moritz, Switzerland.

The finals were held in Aspen, Colorado (USA) from 15 to 19 March 2017; however, Hirscher clinched the overall title two weeks earlier, on 4 March, by winning a giant slalom in Kranjska Gora, Slovenia.

== Standings ==
#	Skier	DH; 8 races	SG; 6 races	GS; 9 races	SL; 11 races	AC; 2 races	Tot.
	(Austria) Marcel Hirscher	0	51	733	735	80	1,599
2	(Norway) Kjetil Jansrud	431	394	75	0	24	924
3	(Norway) Henrik Kristoffersen	0	0	328	575	0	903
4	(France) Alexis Pinturault	0	68	439	257	111	875
5	(Germany) Felix Neureuther	0	0	370	420	0	790
6	(Italy) Peter Fill	454	226	0	0	13	693
7	(Norway) Aleksander Aamodt Kilde	178	299	59	40	92	668
8	(Italy) Dominik Paris	371	277	1	0	4	653
9	(Italy) Manfred Mölgg	0	0	104	476	0	580
10	(Austria) Hannes Reichelt	253	303	0	0	0	556
11	(Switzerland) Beat Feuz	259	187	0	0	1	447
12	(Switzerland) Carlo Janka	240	80	114	0	12	446
13	(Austria) Matthias Mayer	237	189	0	0	16	442
14	(France) Mathieu Faivre	0	0	440	0	0	440
15	(Sweden) Andre Myhrer	0	0	150	284	0	434
16	(Canada) Erik Guay	255	175	0	0	0	430
17	(Norway) Leif Kristian Haugen	0	0	282	102	0	384
18	(Austria) Michael Matt	0	0	0	382	0	382
19	(Russia) Alexander Khoroshilov	0	0	6	372	0	372
20	(Slovenia) Boštjan Kline	230	122	0	0	0	352
21	(Italy) Stefano Gross	0	0	0	345	0	345
22	(France) Adrien Théaux	233	107	0	0	0	340
23	(Germany) Stefan Luitz	0	0	281	57	0	338
	(United Kingdom) Dave Ryding	0	0	0	338	0	338
25	(Austria) Max Franz	139	190	0	0	0	329

- Leader
- 2nd place
- 3rd place
- Updated at 19 March 2017, after all events

== See also ==
- 2017 Alpine Skiing World Cup – Men's summary rankings
- 2017 Alpine Skiing World Cup – Men's downhill
- 2017 Alpine Skiing World Cup – Men's super-G
- 2017 Alpine Skiing World Cup – Men's giant slalom
- 2017 Alpine Skiing World Cup – Men's slalom
- 2017 Alpine Skiing World Cup – Men's combined
- 2017 Alpine Skiing World Cup – Women's overall
