= Tobias Kastlunger =

Italian alpine skier (born 1999)

Personal information
- Born: 9 September 1999 (age 27) Bruneck, South Tyrol, Italy

Skiing career
- Country: Italy
- Sport: Alpine skiing
- Club: GS Fiamme Gialle
- Disciplines: Slalom, Giant Slalom
- World Cup debut: 21 December 2020 (age 21)

Olympics
- Teams: 1 − (2026)
- Medals: 0

World Championships
- Teams: 2 − (2023, 2025)
- Medals: 0

World Cup
- Seasons: 6 – (2021–2026)
- Podiums: 0
- Overall titles: 0 – (83rd in 2025)
- Discipline titles: 0 – (32nd in SL, 2025)
Medal record
Men's alpine skiing
Representing Italy
Junior World Championships
Silver medal – second place	2019 Fassa	Giant Slalom

Tobias Kastlunger (born 9 September 1999) is an Italian World Cup alpine ski racer and specializes in the technical events of slalom and giant slalom., He has competed at two world championships and the 2026 Winter Olympics,

== World Cup results ==
=== Season standings ===
Season
Season	Age	Overall	Slalom	Giant slalom	Super G	Downhill
2023	23	113	39	52	—	—
2024	24	97	34	—	—	—
2025	25	83	32	—	—	—
2026	26	102	38	45	—	—

Standings through 14 February 2026

=== Top ten finishes ===
- 0 podiums, 2 top tens

Season
Season	Date	Location	Discipline	Place
2023	11 Dec 2022	Val d'Isere, France	Slalom	10th
2025	15 Dec 2024	Val d'Isere, France	Slalom	7th

== World Championship results ==
Year
Year	Age	Slalom	Giant slalom	Super-G	Downhill	Combined	Team combined	Parallel
2023	23	15	—	—	—	7	—N/a	—
2025	25	DNF2	—	—	—	—N/a	6	—N/a

== Olympic results ==
Year
Year	Age	Slalom	Giant slalom	Super-G	Downhill	Team combined
2026	26	—	DNF1	—	—	DNF1-DNS
