= Steven Amiez =

French alpine skier (born 1998)

Personal information
- Born: 7 September 1998 (age 28) Pralognan-la-Vanoise, France
- Father: Sébastien Amiez

Skiing career
- Country: France
- Sport: Alpine skiing
- Club: CdS Courchevel
- Disciplines: Slalom
- World Cup debut: January 2020 (age 21)

Olympics
- Teams: 1 – (2026)
- Medals: 0

World Championships
- Teams: 2 – (2023, 2025)
- Medals: 0

World Cup
- Seasons: 7 – (2020–2026)
- Podiums: 0
- Overall titles: 0 – (34th in 2025)
- Discipline titles: 0 – (11th in SL, 2025)

Steven Amiez (born 7 September 1998) is a French World Cup alpine ski racer and specializes in slalom. He is the son of Sébastien Amiez.

== Career ==
During his World Cup career, Amiez has two results in the top five, both in slalom.

== World Cup results ==
=== Season standings ===
Season
Season	Age	Overall	Slalom	Giant slalom	Super-G	Downhill	Parallel
2022	23	126	46	—	—	—	—
2023	24	no World Cup points earned					—N/a
2024	25	47	14	—	—	—	—N/a
2025	26	34	11	—	—	—	—N/a
2026	27	43	17	—	—	—	—N/a

=== Top-five results ===
- 0 podiums, 2 top fives (2 SL), 13 top tens (13 SL)

== World Championship results ==
Year
Year	Age	Slalom	Giant slalom	Super-G	Downhill	Combined	Team combined	Parallel	Team event
2023	24	27	—	—	—	—	—N/a	—	—
2025	26	7	—	—	—	—N/a	12	—N/a	—

== Olympic results ==
Year
Year	Age	Slalom	Giant slalom	Super-G	Downhill	Team combined
2026	27	—	—	—	—	16
