= Albert Popov =

Bulgarian alpine skier (born 1997)

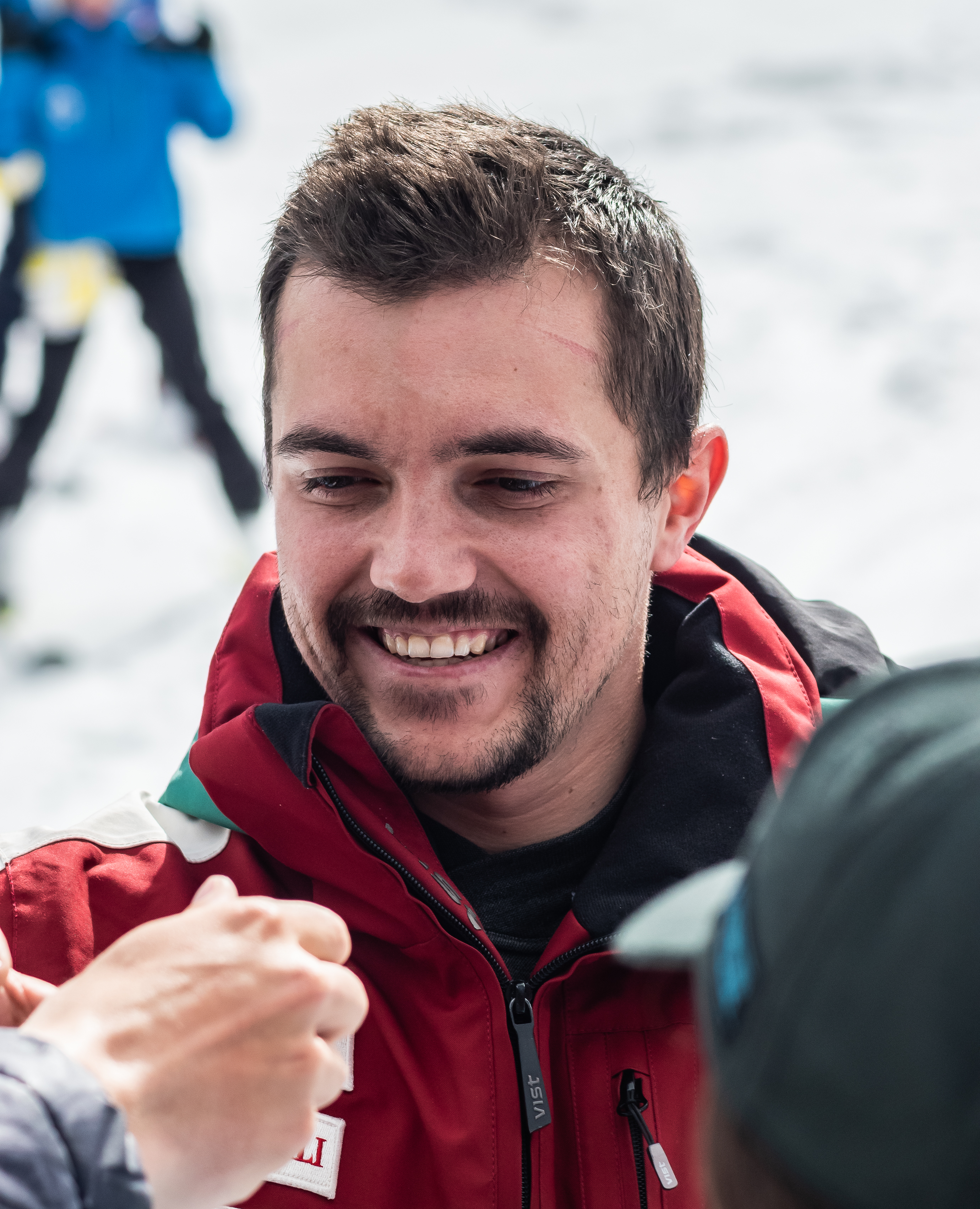
- Popov in 2023

Personal information
- Native name: Алберт Попов
- Born: 8 August 1997 (age 29) Sofia, Bulgaria

Skiing career
- Country: Bulgaria
- Sport: Alpine skiing
- Club: Motensport Sofia
- Disciplines: Slalom
- World Cup debut: 26 October 2014 (age 17)

Olympics
- Teams: 3 – (2018, 2022, 2026)
- Medals: 0

World Championships
- Teams: 6 – (2015–2025)
- Medals: 0

World Cup
- Seasons: 12 – (2015–2026)
- Wins: 1 – 1 (SL)
- Podiums: 2 – 2 (SL)
- Overall titles: 0 – (40th in 2025)
- Discipline titles: 0 – (12th in SL, 2025)
Medal record
Men's alpine skiing
Representing Bulgaria
World Cup race podiums
Event	1st	2nd	3rd
Slalom	1	0	1
Total	1	0	1
Junior World Championships
Bronze medal – third place	2018 Davos	Giant slalom

Albert Popov (Bulgarian: Алберт Попов; born 8 August 1997) is a Bulgarian World Cup alpine ski racer and specializes in slalom. Popov is the second Bulgarian ever to win a World Cup race, after Petar Popangelov 45 years to the day earlier.

== Career ==
Albert Popov was born in Sofia and made his debut in the FIS Alpine Ski World Cup in 2014, aged just 17. A few months later, he participated at the 2015 FIS Alpine World Ski Championships, where he failed to finish both the slalom and giant slalom events.

Popov was involved in a serious car accident on 17 November 2015, while returning from training near Sölden. He was one of two passengers in a vehicle driven by Drago Grubelnik, then head coach of the Bulgarian ski team, who was also accompanied by his assistant Mitko Hristov. All three occupants of the car were injured in the crash, with Grubelnik later dying of his wounds in a hospital in Murnau, Germany. Popov eventually returned to the FIS circuit for the 2016–17 season and featured at the 2017 World Championships, where he finished 27th overall in slalom and 30th overall in the giant slalom event.

On 6 February 2018, Popov won a bronze medal in the giant slalom at the 2018 FIS Junior World Ski Championships in Davos. Twelve days later, he made his debut at the Winter Olympics in Pyeongchang 2018, where he placed 28th in the giant slalom and did not finish the slalom.

His World Cup breakthrough came in the opening race of the 2018–19 season in Levi, where he finished 20th, earning 11 points - Bulgaria's first in the World Cup since Petar Popangelov during the 1986–87 season. Popov followed that up with a 16th-place finish at Madonna di Campiglio in December, after starting with the number 72 bib. On 26 January 2019, he finished 9th in the slalom event at Kitzbühel, which was the best result for a Bulgarian skier since Popangelov placed 7th at Heavenly Valley in 1985–86. Three days later he reached another milestone, finishing 6th at Schladming, his country's highest placement since Popangelov's 6th place at Park City during the 1984–85 season.

Popov scored his first World Cup points of the 2019–20 season on 15 December 2019, when he finished 12th in the slalom at Val-d'Isère. On 8 January 2020, he took 18th place in the slalom at Madonna di Campiglio, his second consecutive points finish at that event. Four days later he finished 13th in the slalom at Adelboden. On 28 January 2020, Popov finished 19th during the slalom event at Schladming, equaling his season's best of four point placements.

On 8 January 2025, he made a remarkable comeback in the second run, securing his first World Cup race victory in the classic 3-Tre night slalom at Madonna di Campiglio.

== World Cup results ==
=== Season standings ===
Season
Season	Age	Overall	Slalom	Giant; Slalom	Super G	Downhill	Combined	Parallel	Points
2019	21	66	23	—	—	—	—	—N/a	95
2020	22	90	31	—	—	—	—	—	67
2021	23	72	26	—	—	—	—N/a	—	90
2022	24	57	21	—	—	—	—N/a	—	147
2023	25	44	15	—	—	—	—N/a	—N/a	182
2024	26	62	24	—	—	—	—N/a	—N/a	111
2025	27	40	12	—	—	—	—N/a	—N/a	229
2026	28	66	22	—	—	—	—N/a	—N/a	106

=== Top-ten results ===
- 1 win – (1 SL)
- 2 podiums – (2 SL), 11 top tens (11 SL)

Season
Season	Date	Location	Discipline	Place
2019	26 January 2019	Kitzbühel, Austria	Slalom	9th
2019	29 January 2019	Schladming, Austria	Slalom	6th
2021	26 January 2021	Schladming, Austria	Slalom	6th
2022	20 March 2022	Méribel, France	Slalom	4th
2023	22 December 2022	Madonna di Campiglio, Italy	Slalom	10th
2023	26 February 2023	Palisades Tahoe, United States	Slalom	3rd
2024	18 November 2023	Gurgl, Austria	Slalom	10th
2025	23 December 2024	Alta Badia, Italy	Slalom	10th
2025	8 January 2025	Madonna di Campiglio, Italy	Slalom	1st
2025	19 January 2025	Wengen, Switzerland	Slalom	10th
2026	22 November 2025	Gurgl, Austria	Slalom	9th

== World Championships results ==
Year
Year	Age	Slalom	Giant; Slalom	Super G	Downhill	Combined	Team; Combined
2015	17	DNF1	DNF1	—	—	—	—N/a
2017	19	27	30	—	—	—	—N/a
2019	21	DNF1	29	—	—	—	—N/a
2021	23	DNF2	24	—	—	—	—N/a
2023	25	DNF1	35	—	—	—	—N/a
2025	27	18	—	—	—	—N/a	—

== Olympic results ==
Year
Year	Age	Slalom	Giant; Slalom	Super G	Downhill	Combined	Team combined
2018	20	DNF1	28	—	—	—	—N/a
2022	24	9	17	—	—	—	—N/a
2026	28	DNF1	—	—	—	—N/a	—
