= Léo Anguenot =

French alpine skier (born 1998)

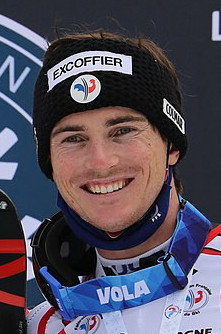
- Anguenot in 2021

Personal information
- Born: 25 August 1998 (age 28) Annecy, Auvergne-Rhône-Alpes, France

Skiing career
- Country: France
- Sport: Alpine skiing
- Club: Club de Sports La Clusaz
- Disciplines: Slalom, giant slalom
- World Cup debut: 12 January 2019 (age 20)

Olympics
- Teams: 1 – (2026)
- Medals: 0

World Championships
- Teams: 2 – (2023, 2025)
- Medals: 0

World Cup
- Seasons: 8 – (2019–2026)
- Wins: 0
- Podiums: 2 – (2 GS)
- Overall titles: 0 – (44th in 2026)
- Discipline titles: 0 – (14th in GS, 2026)

Léo Anguenot (born 25 August 1998 in Annecy) is a French alpine skier and water skier. He competed at the 2026 Winter Olympics.

Anguenot began skiing at age two and began skiing competitively at age six. He competed in both alpine skiing and water skiing until he was 19, when he chose to focus on alpine skiing.

== World Cup results ==
=== Season standings ===
Season
Season	Age	Overall	Slalom	Giant slalom	Super-G	Downhill
2023	24	130	—	47	—	—
2024	25	73	52	27	—	—
2025	26	52	—	15	—	—
2026	27	44	—	14	—	—

=== Top-ten results ===
- 0 wins
- 2 podiums (2 GS), 4 top tens (4 GS)

Season
Season	Date	Location	Discipline	Place
2025	12 December 2024	Alta Badia, Italy	Giant slalom	2nd
2026	28 November 2025	Copper Mountain, United States	Giant slalom	7th
2026	10 January 2026	Adelboden, Switzerland	Giant slalom	3rd
2026	7 March 2026	Kranjska Gora, Slovenia	Giant slalom	6th

== World Championship results ==
Year
Year	Age	Slalom	Giant slalom	Super-G	Downhill	Team event
2023	17	29	24	—	—	7
2025	19	—	15	—	—	8

== Olympics results ==
Year
Year	Age	Slalom	Giant slalom	Super-G	Downhill	Team combined
2026	27	DNF1	6	—	—	—
