= 2025 Alpine Skiing World Cup – Men's overall =

Alpine ski discipline year standings

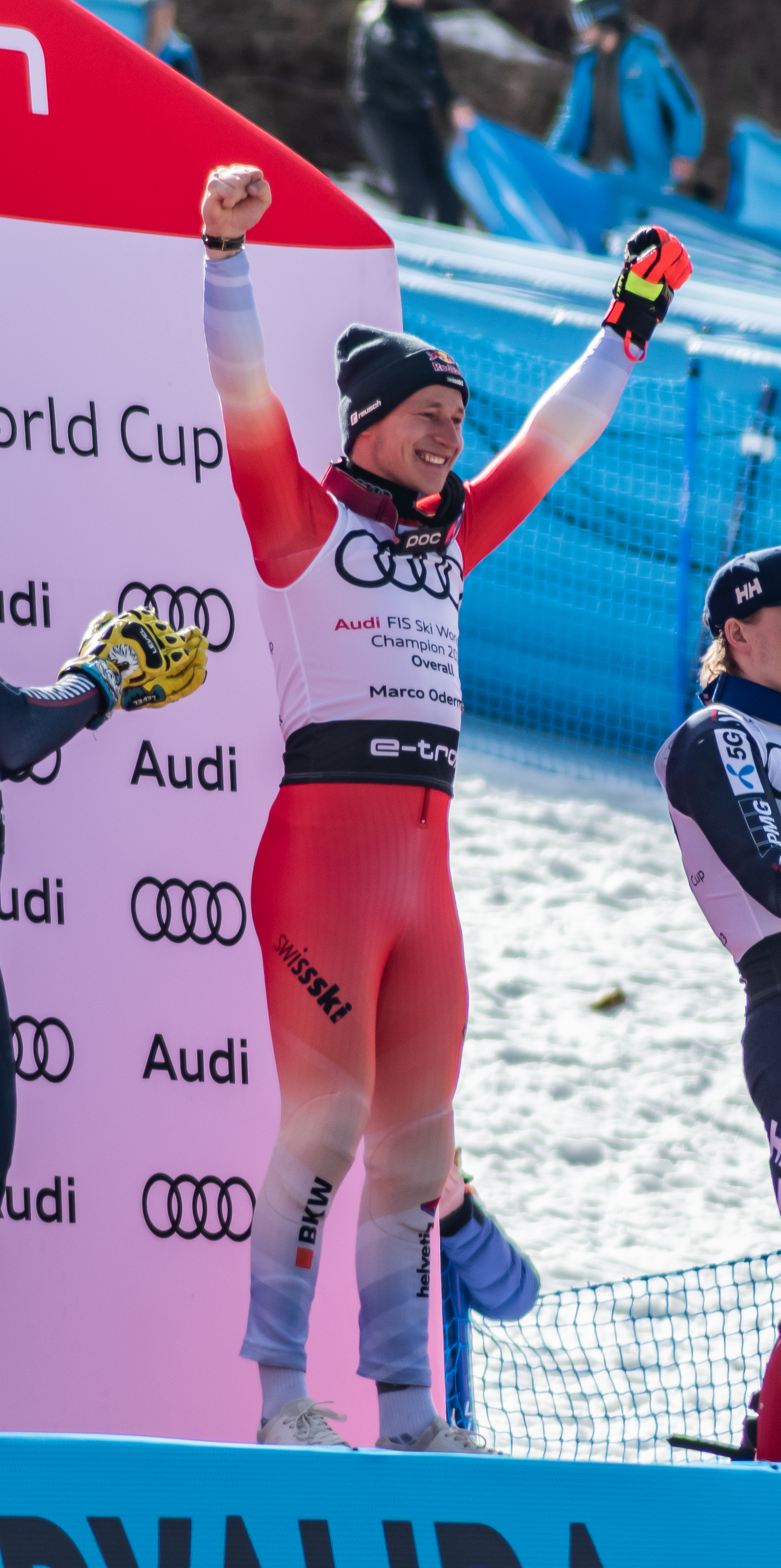
2025 Men's Overall World Cup: Marco Odermatt of Switzerland, season champion for the fourth straight year; 2025 Men's World Cup; Overall • Downhill • Super-G; Giant slalom • Slalom
| Previous: 2024 | Next: 2026 |

The men's overall in the 2025 FIS Alpine Skiing World Cup consisted of 37 events in four disciplines: downhill (DH) (8 races), super-G (SG) (8 races), giant slalom (GS) (9 races), and slalom (SL) (12 races). Until finals, no races had been cancelled from the schedule, although one had to be rescheduled; however, the downhill at finals was permanently cancelled on 22 March. Swiss three-event star Marco Odermatt easily won his fourth consecutive overall title, along with both the super-G and giant slalom disciplines, all prior to the finals, and he then won the downhill discipline when the finals race in it was cancelled, giving him crystal globes in all four disciplines for the second straight year.

After cancellations in both of the prior two seasons, the two downhills scheduled on the Matterhorn in mid-November were removed from the schedule. Thus, for the third straight season, only the four major disciplines were contested on the World Cup circuit.

As is the case every other year, the FIS Alpine World Ski Championships 2025 took place, this time in Saalbach, Austria during 4–16 February 2025. The Swiss men's team excelled, winning 10 of a possible 18 medals. Gold medals were won by (all Swiss unless otherwise noted) Franjo von Allmen in the downhill, Odermatt in the super-G, Raphael Haaser of Austria in the giant slalom, Loïc Meillard in the slalom, von Allmen (DH) and Meillard (SL) in the team combined, and Italy (including Filippo Della Vite and Alex Vinatzer) in the mixed-team parallel; Meillard, with two golds and a bronze in giant slalom, was the only man to win three medals.

== Season summary ==
Although Marco Odermatt of Switzerland had won the last three overall titles, his path to a fourth straight title would need to get past two new obstacles returning from their retirements, both of whom are sponsored by Red Bull, which is headquartered in Austria. First, Lucas Braathen of Norway, who won the 2023 slalom discipline title (and finished fourth overall that season) before retiring over a dispute with the national team over his individual commercial rights changed his sponsoring nation to Brazil, his mother's home nation, with the approval of Norway and added his Portuguese middle name (Pinheiro) to his FIS registration. Second, Marcel Hirscher of Austria, who retired from Alpine skiing in 2019 after winning eight consecutive men's overall titles, decided to return after five years away from the sport . . . but, like Braathen, for his mother's home nation: the Netherlands (again, with the approval of Austria). However, Hirscher suffered a season-ending tear of a cruciate ligament in December during training and expressed some doubt about whether he'd return for the 2026 season,

=== Early season ===
By placing second in each of the first two technical events (a giant slalom in Sölden and a slalom in Levi), two-time overall runner-up Henrik Kristoffersen of Norway jumped into the overall lead at the start of the season, ahead of his countryman Alexander Steen Olsen, who was leading after winning the giant slalom. In the third technical event, another slalom, Kristoffersen only finished sixth, allowing 2022 Olympic slalom gold medalist Clément Noël, who won both of the first two slaloms of the season, to tie Kristoffersen for the overall lead through three races.

After a week off, the men moved to Beaver Creek, Colorado (United States) for three races (DH, SG, GS). Defending overall champion Marco Odermatt of Switzerland was favored in each of the three races, and he won the super-G for his 38th World Cup victory, but he was unset by his teammate Justin Murisier in downhill. In the giant slalom, Kristoffersen's fifth-place finish (worth 45 points) was sufficient to put him in solo first pace, with Thomas Tumler of Switzerland collecting his first World Cup win and Odermatt once again failing to complete both runs. Odermatt finally won a giant slalom this season when the World Cup circuit returned to Europe at Val d'Isère, France; however, Kristoffersen narrowly retained the overall lead over Odermatt. Then, after an almost two-year victory drought, Kristoffersen won the slalom in Val d'Isére to stretch his lead to over 100 points, with his Norwegian teammate Atle Lie McGrath edging out Odermatt for second place.

The last four races before Christmas took place in Italy (Val Gardena for speed and Alta Badia for technical), and Odermatt's victories in both downhill and giant slalom, plus a third in super-G, returned him to the top of the leaderboard before Christmas, as well as establishing him as the male Swiss skier with the most World Cup victories (41, one more than Pirmin Zurbriggen).

=== Mid-season ===
Although Odermatt has consistently held the lead in the overall standings since seizing it, he was not able to establish his usual dominance over his rivals, particularly Kristoffersen. At Bormio (Italy) in the week between Christmas and New Years, the downhill and super-G were both won by first-time World Cup winners: Alexis Monney of Switzerland and Fredrik Møller of Norway, respectively, and the first race after New Years, a slalom in Madonna di Campiglio (Italy) was won by another first-time winner, Albert Popov of Bulgaria, recording his country's second-ever World Cup win and first in exactly 45 years. At Adelboden, a slalom victory by Noël (his third of the season) and a podium finish by Kristoffersen brought Kristoffersen back to within 56 points of Odermatt, but a come-from-behind win by Odermatt in the next day's giant slalom (his third consecutive in the discipline), followed immediately by Kristoffersen failing to finish the second run, restored Odermatt's substantial lead.

The next two weeks were the traditional downhill/super-G/slalom races at Wengen, Switzerland (the Lauberhorn ski races) and Kitzbühel, Austria (the Hahnenkammrennen). Odermatt won the downhill at Wengen and the super-G at Kitzbühel, while Kristoffersen's best finish was a third in the slalom at Wengen, enabling Odermatt to pad his lead. Odermatt's Swiss teammate Franjo von Allmen was also successful at Wengen, winning his first-ever World Cup race in the super-G and placing second in the downhill, while the Canadians James Crawford and Cameron Alexander pulled a surprising upset in the downhill at Kitzbühel, with Crawford also picking up his first World Cup win. In the slaloms, Wengen offered a Norwegian sweep, with the win going to Atle Lie McGrath, while Kitzbühel featured Noël's return to the top step of the podium for the fourth time this season.

Two days later, racing in the technical events resumed under the lights at Schlamding, Austria, with a Norwegian sweep: Alexander Steen Olsen in the giant slalom, his second win of the season (with Kristoffersen second and Odermatt third), and Timon Haugan in the slalom, also with his second win of the season (with Kristoffersen taking over the season lead in the discipline). The final race scheduled before worlds, a downhill in Garmisch-Partenkirchen, Germany, had to be cancelled when fog wiped out both training runs; the race was quickly rescheduled at Kvitfjell in March.

=== Late season: Odermatt once again, despite Kristoffersen's chase ===
In the first set of races after worlds, a speed weekend in Crans Montana, Switzerland, Odermatt put up another 180 points on home snow by finishing second in the downhill to his teammate von Allmen and then winning the super-G. Kristoffersen fought back with a 140-point gain at Kransja Gora, Slovenia by winning both the giant slalom (with Odermatt third) and the slalom. But the next racing weekend at Kvitfjell, Norway comprised two downhills and a super-G; although Dominik Paris of Italy won two of the races, and Odermatt's teammate Von Allmen won the third, Odermatt posted two seconds and a fourth for 210 points, which left him with a 570-point lead with only 600 points still to go -- meaning that Kristoffersen would have to win all the six remaining races while Odermatt was limited to no more than 30 points. And in the very next race, a giant slalom in Hafjell, Norway, Odermatt finished second while Kristoffersen finished 16th, ending the battle for the overall title and setting up a battle for second between Kristoffersen and race victor Loïc Meillard, also of Switzerland, who had starred at the World Championships and now rose to third, just 130 points behind. Meillard, last season's runner-up to Odermatt, also won the slalom the next day (with Kristoffersen fifth, clinching a podium spot for the season), closing to 75 points behind Kristoffersen for second, with only von Allmen chasing him from behind.

== Finals ==
The finals in all disciplines were held from 22 to 27 March 2025 in Sun Valley, Idaho, United States. Only the top 25 skiers in each World Cup discipline and the winner of the Junior World Championship in the discipline, plus any skiers who have scored at least 500 points in the World Cup overall classification for the season, were eligible to compete in the final, and only the top 15 finishers earned World Cup points.

Not a single racer had earned points in all four events during the season, but Loïc Meillard was competing in his first downhill of the season at finals, and if he placed in the top 15, he would achieve that goal. However, a combination of fresh snow in the morning and high winds in the evening forced the downhill finals to be cancelled, thus handing the discipline crown to Odermatt (his fourth, matching his 2024 total) and also locking up a Swiss podium sweep (with von Allmen second and Monney third) -- while simultaneously ending Meillard's chances to score in the fourth discipline. The next day, though, the bad weather had moved on, and in a significant upset in the super-G, 23-year-old Austrian Lukas Feurstein won his first World Cup race -- and Austria's first World Cup victory in the entire men's 2024-25 World Cup season in any discipline. In giant slalom, Meillard won by almost a second over his teammate Odermatt, with Kristoffersen third, thus allowing Meillard to gain 40 points on Kristoffersen and leaving him 35 points behind in the race for second, with only one event -- slalom -- to go. However, for all intents and purposes, the drama concerning the runner-up to Odermatt ended after the first run of the slalom, when Meillard finished over 1.5 seconds behind the leader and almost that far behind Kristoffersen; even though Meillard recovered to post the fastest second-run time, he still finished just behind Kristoffersen (in 5th, with Kristoffersen 4th) and had to settle for third place on the season; the slalom itself was decided by only 0.03 seconds in favor of Kristoffersen's teammate Haugan (his third win of the season) over Noël.

== Standings ==
| # | Skier | DH; 8 races | SG; 8 races | GS; 9 races | SL; 12 races | Total |
| | (Switzerland) Marco Odermatt | 605 | 536 | 580 | 0 | 1,721 |
| 2 | (Norway) Henrik Kristoffersen | 0 | 0 | 454 | 662 | 1,116 |
| 3 | (Switzerland) Loïc Meillard | 0 | 32 | 434 | 610 | 1,076 |
| 4 | (Switzerland) Franjo von Allmen | 522 | 314 | 0 | 0 | 836 |
| 5 | (Norway) Timon Haugan | 0 | 0 | 212 | 609 | 821 |
| 6 | (Brazil) Lucas Pinheiro Braathen | 0 | 0 | 341 | 373 | 714 |
| 7 | (Norway) Atle Lie McGrath | 0 | 0 | 194 | 474 | 668 |
| 8 | (France) Clément Noël | 0 | 0 | 0 | 606 | 606 |
| 9 | (Switzerland) Alexis Monney | 327 | 240 | 0 | 0 | 567 |
| 10 | (Switzerland) Stefan Rogentin | 234 | 321 | 0 | 0 | 555 |
| 11 | (Italy) Dominik Paris | 262 | 262 | 0 | 0 | 524 |
| 12 | (Austria) Vincent Kriechmayr | 178 | 317 | 0 | 0 | 495 |
| 13 | (Canada) James Crawford | 270 | 198 | 0 | 0 | 468 |
| 14 | (Norway) Alexander Steen Olsen | 0 | 0 | 346 | 97 | 443 |
| 15 | (Slovenia) Miha Hrobat | 320 | 120 | 0 | 0 | 440 |
| 16 | (Croatia) Filip Zubčić | 0 | 0 | 262 | 154 | 416 |
| 17 | (Switzerland) Justin Murisier | 257 | 128 | 14 | 0 | 399 |
| 18 | (Italy) Mattia Casse | 122 | 260 | 0 | 0 | 382 |
| 19 | (France) Nils Allègre | 193 | 176 | 0 | 0 | 369 |
| 20 | (Austria) Fabio Gstrein | 0 | 0 | 0 | 359 | 359 |
| 21 | (Austria) Manuel Feller | 0 | 0 | 34 | 305 | 339 |
| 22 | (Canada) Cameron Alexander | 194 | 144 | 0 | 0 | 338 |
| 23 | (Switzerland) Tanguy Nef | 0 | 0 | 0 | 327 | 327 |
| 24 | (Austria) Raphael Haaser | 6 | 225 | 94 | 0 | 325 |
| 25 | (Germany) Linus Straßer | 0 | 0 | 9 | 305 | 314 |
| 26 | (Norway) Fredrik Møller | 28 | 270 | 0 | 0 | 298 |
| | (Switzerland) Thomas Tumler | 0 | 0 | 298 | 0 | 298 |
| 28 | (United States) Ryan Cochran-Siegle | 176 | 120 | 0 | 0 | 296 |
| 29 | (Norway) Adrian Smiseth Sejersted | 144 | 144 | 0 | 0 | 288 |
| 30 | (Austria) Stefan Brennsteiner | 0 | 0 | 284 | 0 | 284 |
| 31 | (Slovenia) Žan Kranjec | 0 | 0 | 277 | 0 | 277 |
| 32 | (Italy) Alex Vinatzer | 0 | 0 | 98 | 174 | 272 |
| 33 | (Austria) Stefan Eichberger | 129 | 141 | 0 | 0 | 270 |
| 34 | (France) Steven Amiez | 0 | 0 | 0 | 268 | 269 |
| 35 | (Austria) Lukas Feurstein | 0 | 236 | 32 | 0 | 268 |
| 36 | (United States) River Radamus | 0 | 50 | 212 | 4 | 266 |
| 37 | (Austria) Marco Schwarz | 0 | 0 | 161 | 82 | 243 |
| 38 | (Italy) Luca De Aliprandini | 0 | 0 | 237 | 0 | 237 |
| 39 | (Austria) Stefan Babinsky | 121 | 111 | 0 | 0 | 232 |
| 40 | (Bulgaria) Albert Popov | 0 | 0 | 0 | 229 | 229 |
| 41 | (Croatia) Samuel Kolega | 0 | 0 | 0 | 226 | 226 |
| 42 | (Switzerland) Daniel Yule | 0 | 0 | 0 | 217 | 217 |
| 43 | (Austria) Daniel Hemetsberger | 122 | 87 | 0 | 0 | 209 |
| 44 | (Austria) Patrick Feurstein | 0 | 0 | 205 | 0 | 205 |
| 45 | (United Kingdom) Dave Ryding | 0 | 0 | 0 | 197 | 197 |
| 46 | (Switzerland) Luca Aerni | 0 | 0 | 120 | 74 | 194 |
| 47 | (United States) Bryce Bennett | 164 | 26 | 0 | 0 | 190 |
| 48 | (Sweden) Kristoffer Jakobsen | 0 | 0 | 0 | 188 | 188 |
| 49 | (Italy) Giovanni Franzoni | 40 | 147 | 0 | 0 | 187 |
| 50 | (United States) Benjamin Ritchie | 0 | 0 | 0 | 178 | 178 |
| 51 | (France) Victor Muffat-Jeandet | 0 | 0 | 5 | 169 | 174 |
| 52 | (France) Léo Anguenot | 0 | 0 | 165 | 0 | 165 |
| 53 | (France) Thibaut Favrot | 0 | 0 | 162 | 0 | 162 |
| 54 | (Belgium) Sam Maes | 0 | 0 | 121 | 36 | 157 |
| 55 | (Andorra) Joan Verdú | 0 | 0 | 153 | 0 | 153 |
| | (Belgium) Armand Marchant | 0 | 0 | 0 | 153 | 153 |
| 57 | (Czech Republic) Jan Zabystřan | 46 | 97 | 0 | 0 | 143 |
| 58 | (United States) Jared Goldberg | 28 | 113 | 0 | 0 | 141 |
| | (Italy) Florian Schieder | 128 | 13 | 0 | 0 | 141 |
| 60 | (Austria) Dominik Raschner | 0 | 0 | 0 | 134 | 134 |
| 61 | (Switzerland) Lars Rösti | 99 | 32 | 0 | 0 | 131 |
| 62 | (France) Cyprien Sarrazin | 43 | 80 | 3 | 0 | 126 |
| 63 | (Switzerland) Gino Caviezel | 0 | 36 | 89 | 0 | 125 |
| 64 | (France) Paco Rassat | 0 | 0 | 0 | 123 | 123 |
| 65 | (Austria) Johannes Strolz | 0 | 0 | 0 | 119 | 119 |
| 66 | (Germany) Romed Baumann | 62 | 49 | 0 | 0 | 111 |
| 67 | (Germany) Anton Grammel | 0 | 0 | 107 | 0 | 107 |
| 68 | (France) Maxence Muzaton | 105 | 0 | 0 | 0 | 105 |
| | (Austria) Michael Matt | 0 | 0 | 0 | 105 | 105 |
| 70 | (Finland) Elian Lehto | 70 | 27 | 0 | 0 | 97 |
| | (Italy) Christof Innerhofer | 38 | 59 | 0 | 0 | 97 |
| 72 | (France) Blaise Giezendanner | 39 | 50 | 0 | 0 | 89 |
| | (Austria) Otmar Striedinger | 64 | 25 | 0 | 0 | 89 |
| 74 | (Canada) Brodie Seger | 66 | 21 | 0 | 0 | 87 |
| | (France) Adrien Théaux | 57 | 30 | 0 | 0 | 87 |
| 76 | (Austria) Adrian Pertl | 0 | 0 | 0 | 86 | 86 |
| 77 | (France) Alexis Pinturault | 0 | 26 | 48 | 0 | 74 |
| 78 | (Estonia) Tormis Laine | 0 | 0 | 44 | 27 | 71 |
| | (Switzerland) Marc Rochat | 0 | 0 | 0 | 71 | 71 |
| 80 | (Switzerland) Marco Kohler | 59 | 9 | 0 | 0 | 68 |
| 81 | (Sweden) Felix Monsén | 20 | 45 | 0 | 0 | 65 |
| 82 | (Croatia) Istok Rodeš | 0 | 0 | 0 | 62 | 62 |
| 83 | (Italy) Tobias Kastlunger | 0 | 0 | 0 | 61 | 61 |
| | (Italy) Stefano Gross | 0 | 0 | 0 | 61 | 61 |
| 85 | (United Kingdom) Laurie Taylor | 0 | 0 | 0 | 59 | 59 |
| 86 | (Slovenia) Nejc Naraločnik | 58 | 0 | 0 | 0 | 58 |
| 87 | (Switzerland) Ramon Zenhäusern | 0 | 0 | 0 | 57 | 57 |
| 88 | (Finland) Eduard Hallberg | 0 | 0 | 0 | 55 | 55 |
| | (United Kingdom) Billy Major | 0 | 0 | 0 | 55 | 55 |
| 90 | (Germany) Alexander Schmid | 0 | 0 | 53 | 0 | 53 |
| 91 | (Slovenia) Martin Čater | 50 | 2 | 0 | 0 | 52 |
| 92 | (France) Matthieu Bailet | 27 | 23 | 0 | 0 | 50 |
| 93 | (France) Florian Loriot | 0 | 49 | 0 | 0 | 49 |
| | (United States) Kyle Negomir | 6 | 43 | 0 | 0 | 49 |
| 95 | (Norway) Rasmus Windingstad | 0 | 1 | 47 | 0 | 48 |
| | (United States) Jett Seymour | 0 | 0 | 0 | 48 | 48 |
| 97 | (Germany) Luis Vogt | 28 | 18 | 0 | 0 | 46 |
| 98 | (Italy) Filippo Della Vite | 0 | 0 | 45 | 0 | 45 |
| | (Canada) Jeffrey Read | 3 | 42 | 0 | 0 | 45 |
| 100 | (Germany) Fabian Gratz | 0 | 0 | 43 | 0 | 43 |
| 101 | (Sweden) Fabian Ax Swartz | 0 | 0 | 0 | 41 | 41 |
| | (France) Nils Alphand | 35 | 6 | 0 | 0 | 41 |
| | (Italy) Nicolo Molteni | 22 | 19 | 0 | 0 | 41 |
| 104 | (United States) Sam Morse | 34 | 6 | 0 | 0 | 40 |
| 105 | (Austria) Andreas Ploier | 10 | 28 | 0 | 0 | 38 |
| 106 | (Germany) Jonas Stockinger | 0 | 0 | 37 | 0 | 37 |
| 107 | (Italy) Giovanni Borsotti | 0 | 0 | 35 | 0 | 35 |
| 108 | (France) Alban Elezi Cannaferina | 0 | 0 | 32 | 0 | 32 |
| 109 | (Austria) Joshua Sturm | 0 | 0 | 0 | 31 | 31 |
| 110 | (Austria) Daniel Danklmaier | 0 | 29 | 0 | 0 | 29 |
| 111 | (Austria) Felix Hacker | 10 | 18 | 0 | 0 | 28 |
| 112 | (Italy) Pietro Zazzi | 0 | 24 | 0 | 0 | 24 |
| | (Austria) Stefan Rieser | 24 | 0 | 0 | 0 | 24 |
| 114 | (United States) Tommy Ford | 0 | 0 | 23 | 0 | 23 |
| 115 | (Germany) Simon Jocher | 22 | 0 | 0 | 0 | 22 |
| | (Switzerland) Livio Hiltbrand | 22 | 0 | 0 | 0 | 22 |
| | (Sweden) William Hansson | 0 | 0 | 22 | 0 | 22 |
| 118 | (Canada) Erik Read | 0 | 0 | 11 | 10 | 21 |
| 119 | (France) Flavio Vitale | 0 | 0 | 20 | 0 | 20 |
| 120 | (Germany) Stefan Luitz | 0 | 0 | 19 | 0 | 19 |
| 121 | (Italy) Benjamin Jacques Alliod | 18 | 0 | 0 | 0 | 18 |
| | (Austria) Noel Zwischenbrugger | 0 | 0 | 18 | 0 | 18 |
| 123 | (United States) Patrick Kenney | 0 | 0 | 17 | 0 | 17 |
| 124 | (Spain) Joaquim Salarich | 0 | 0 | 0 | 16 | 16 |
| | (Canada) Riley Seger | 0 | 16 | 0 | 0 | 16 |
| | (Switzerland) Fadri Janutin | 0 | 0 | 16 | 0 | 16 |
| | (Austria) Vincent Wieser | 8 | 8 | 0 | 0 | 16 |
| | (Norway) Oscar Andreas Sandvik | 0 | 0 | 0 | 16 | 16 |
| 129 | (Norway) Rasmus Bakkevig | 0 | 0 | 14 | 0 | 14 |
| 130 | (France) Hugo Desgrippes | 0 | 0 | 0 | 13 | 13 |
| | (Slovakia) Andreas Žampa | 0 | 0 | 13 | 0 | 13 |
| 132 | (Norway) Sebastian Foss-Solevåg | 0 | 0 | 0 | 12 | 12 |
| | (Greece) AJ Ginnis | 0 | 0 | 0 | 12 | 12 |
| | (Sweden) Gustav Wissting | 0 | 0 | 0 | 12 | 12 |
| | (United States) Wiley Maple | 10 | 2 | 0 | 0 | 12 |
| | (France) Loévan Parand | 0 | 0 | 12 | 0 | 12 |
| 137 | (Austria) Manuel Tranninger | 5 | 6 | 0 | 0 | 11 |
| 138 | (Italy) Simon Maurberger | 0 | 0 | 0 | 10 | 10 |
| | (Austria) Christopher Neumayer | 10 | 0 | 0 | 0 | 10 |
| | (France) Diego Orecchioni | 0 | 0 | 10 | 0 | 10 |
| 141 | (Germany) Anton Tremmel | 0 | 0 | 0 | 9 | 9 |
| 142 | (United States) Erik Arvidsson | 8 | 0 | 0 | 0 | 8 |
| | (Chile) Henrik von Appen | 8 | 0 | 0 | 0 | 8 |
| | (Netherlands) Marcel Hirscher | 0 | 0 | 8 | 0 | 8 |
| | (Norway) Eirik Hystad Solberg | 0 | 0 | 0 | 8 | 8 |
| 146 | (Italy) Hannes Zingerle | 0 | 0 | 7 | 0 | 7 |
| | (Switzerland) Josua Mettler | 7 | 0 | 0 | 0 | 7 |
| | (United States) Bridger Gile | 0 | 0 | 7 | 0 | 7 |
| 149 | (Switzerland) Livio Simonet | 0 | 0 | 4 | 0 | 4 |
| | (Liechtenstein) Marco Pfiffner | 4 | 0 | 0 | 0 | 4 |
| | (Switzerland) Arnaud Boisset | 0 | 4 | 0 | 0 | 4 |
| 152 | (Norway) Jesper Wahlqvist | 0 | 0 | 3 | 0 | 3 |
| 153 | (Sweden) Mattias Rönngren | 0 | 0 | 2 | 0 | 2 |
| 154 | (Italy) Matteo Franzoso | 0 | 1 | 0 | 0 | 1 |

- Leader
- 2nd place
- 3rd place
- does not compete in this discipline
- Updated on 27 March 2025, after all 37 events plus worlds.

== See also ==
- 2025 Alpine Skiing World Cup – Men's summary rankings
- 2025 Alpine Skiing World Cup – Men's downhill
- 2025 Alpine Skiing World Cup – Men's super-G
- 2025 Alpine Skiing World Cup – Men's giant slalom
- 2025 Alpine Skiing World Cup – Men's slalom
- 2025 Alpine Skiing World Cup – Women's overall
- World Cup scoring system
