= Alexander Steen Olsen =

Norwegian alpine skier

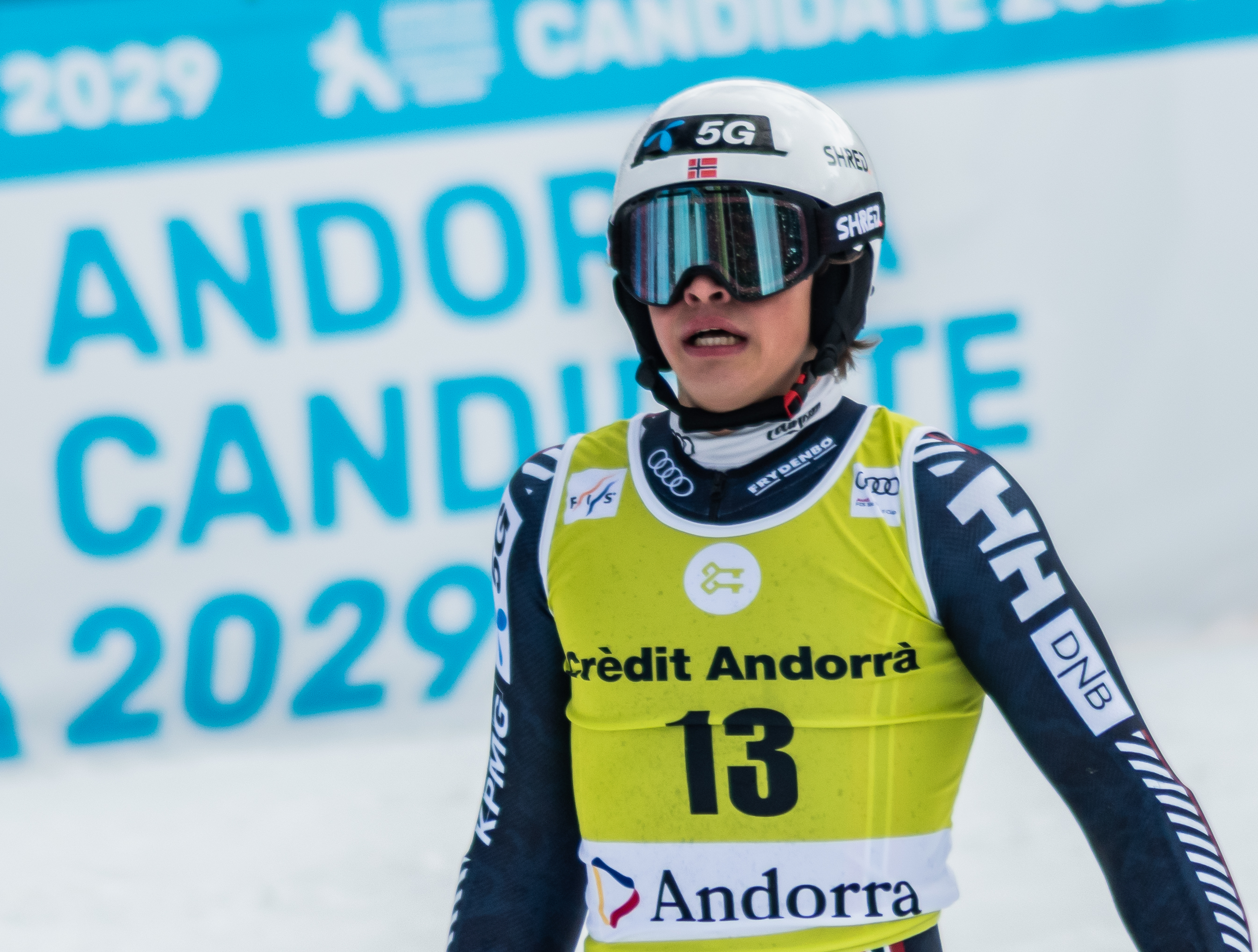
- Steen Olsen in 2023

Personal information
- Born: 18 August 2001 (age 25)

Skiing career
- Sport: Alpine skiing
- Club: Kjelsås Idrettslag
- Disciplines: Slalom, Giant slalom
- World Cup debut: 27 February 2021 (age 19)

Olympics
- Teams: 0

World Championships
- Teams: 2 – (2023, 2025)
- Medals: 1 (0 gold)

World Cup
- Seasons: 3 – (2023–2025)
- Wins: 3 – (1 SL, 2 GS)
- Podiums: 5 – (1 SL, 4 GS)
- Overall titles: 0 – (13th in 2024)
- Discipline titles: 0 – (4th in GS, 2025)
Medal record
Men's alpine skiing
Representing Norway
World Championships
Silver medal – second place	2023 Méribel	Team event
Junior World Championships
Gold medal – first place	2022 Panorama	Slalom
Gold medal – first place	2022 Panorama	Giant slalom

Alexander Steen Olsen (born 18 August 2001) is a Norwegian World Cup alpine ski racer, and specializes in the technical events of slalom and giant slalom.

== Career ==
Steen Olsen has three World Cup wins; one in slalom and two in giant slalom.

== World Cup results ==
=== Season standings ===
Season
Season	Age	Overall	Slalom	Giant; Slalom	Super-G	Downhill	Combined	Parallel
2022	20	113	—	33	—	—	—N/a	—
2023	21	21	9	22	—	—	—N/a	—N/a
2024	22	13	22	6	—	—	—N/a	—N/a
2025	23	14	26	4	—	—	—N/a	—N/a

Standings through 27 March 2025

=== Race podiums ===
- 3 wins (1 SL, 2 GS)
- 5 podiums (1 SL, 4 GS)

Season
Season	Date	Location	Discipline	Place
2023	26 Feb 2023	(United States) Palisades Tahoe, USA	Slalom	1st
2024	10 Feb 2024	Bansko, Bulgaria	Giant slalom	2nd
2025	27 Oct 2024	Sölden, Austria	Giant slalom	1st
2025	22 Dec 2024	(Italy) Alta Badia, Italia	Giant slalom	3rd
2025	28 Jan 2025	Schladming, Austria	Giant slalom	1st

== World Championship results ==
Year
Year	Age	Slalom	Giant; Slalom	Super-G	Downhill	Combined	Team; Combined	Parallel	Team event
2023	21	22	22	—	—	—	7	2	
2025	23	DNF1	DNF2	—	—	—N/a	—N/a	—	
