= 2025 Alpine Skiing World Cup – Men's giant slalom =

Alpine ski discipline year standings

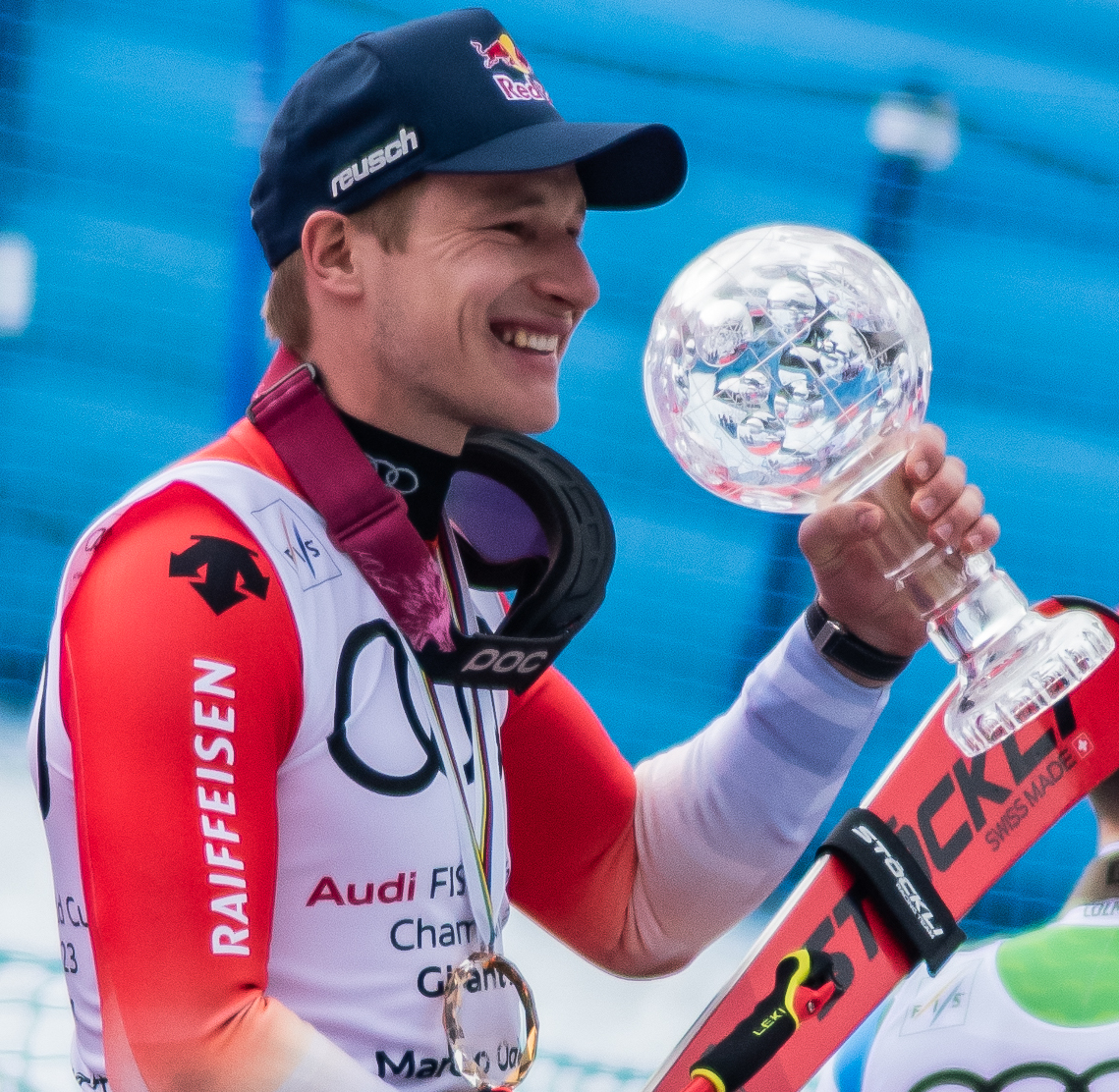
2025 Men's Giant slalom World Cup: Marco Odermatt of Switzerland, season champion for the fourth consecutive year; 2025 Men's World Cup; Overall • Downhill • Super-G; Giant slalom • Slalom
Previous: 2024	Next: 2026

The men's giant slalom in the 2025 FIS Alpine Skiing World Cup consisted of nine events, including the final. The season opened in Sölden, Austria on 27 October 2024. Through the first four events of this season, the discipline had four different leaders; however, the last of that group, three-time defending champion Marco Odermatt of Switzerland, kept the lead after taking it and wrapped up the discipline title the week before finals.

The season was interrupted for the FIS Alpine World Ski Championships 2025, this time in Saalbach, Austria during 4–16 February 2025. The championship in men's giant slalom took place on Friday, 14 February, and was won in a huge upset by Raphael Haaser of Austria, who had never won a top-level race in his career (although he had previously won a silver and a bronze medal in the World Championships).

== Season summary ==
The first giant slalom of the season, scheduled as usual on the Rettenbach glacier in Sölden, Austria in October, resulted in a Norwegian podium sweep, with Alexander Steen Olsen leading the pack. In their returns from retirement, former Norwegian star Lucas Pinheiro Braathen, now of Brazil after one year away, finished fourth, and former Austrian superstar Marcel Hirscher, now of the Netherlands after five years away, finished 23rd. Pinheiro Braathen then assumed the overall lead by one point over Steen Olsen in the second race of the season at Beaver Creek, Colorado (United States), when he narrowly finished second (for Brazil's first-ever World Cup podium finish) behind only Thomas Tumler of Switzerland in Tumler's first World Cup victory (at the same site where he had his first podium finish in 2018).

Back in Europe, at Val d'Isére (France), three-time defending discipline champion Marco Odermatt of Switzerland scored his first points of the season with a narrow victory during dark and snowy conditions, but current Norwegian star Henrik Kristoffersen took over the discipline lead from Braathen with a fifth-pace finish. The very next week, Odermatt won the giant slalom in Alta Badia and took over first place in the discipline from Kristoffersen by one point (200 to 199). Then, in the first giant slalom of 2025, Odermatt's come-from-behind effort in the second run gave him his fourth consecutive victory in the race in Adelboden, Switzerland, tying Ingmar Stenmark's consecutive-victory record, and also giving him a commanding lead in the discipline over Kristoffersen, who was in second after the first run but failed to complete the second. In the last race before the world championships, a night giant slalom in Schlamding, Austria, Alexander Steen Olsen and Kristofferson managed to pull off a Norwegian 1-2, moving each of them within 100 points of Odermatt for the discipline lead.

At the World Championships in Saalbach, Austria, the host country's Raphael Haaser, better known as a super-G racer (in which he had already won silver) and the final selection to the Austrian team for the race, came from fifth on the second run to upset the favored Swiss and win the gold medal, with Swiss skiers placing second (Tumler), third (Loïc Meillard), and fourth (Odermatt). In the first giant slalom after the worlds, Kristoffersen grabbed his first victory of the season over Braathen, with Odermatt third, leaving Kristoffersen 41 points behind in the discipline with two races to go. But the next race, in Hafjell, Norway, ended the battle, as Loïc Meillard won the race with Odermatt second, while Kristoffersen only managed to finish 16th, giving Odermatt both the discipline and overall titles for the season.

== Finals ==
The World Cup finals in the discipline took place on Wednesday, 26 March 2025 in Sun Valley, Idaho, United States. Only the top 25 skiers in the World Cup giant slalom discipline and the winner of the Junior World Championship in the discipline (Flavio Vitale of France), plus any skiers who have scored at least 500 points in the World Cup overall classification for the season, were eligible to compete in the final, and only the top 15 earned World Cup points. Four skiers with 500+ overall points who were not otherwise eligible (Alexis Monney, Franjo von Allmen, and Stefan Rogentin of Switzerland and Clément Noël of France) entered the race through points, while three eligible skiers (Alex Vinatzer and Gino Caviezel of Italy and Alexander Schmid of Germany) missed the race due to injury, leaving a starting field of 27 (including Vitale). In the actual race, Meillard established a significant time gap after the first run and then won by almost a second over his teammate Odermatt, with Kristoffersen third, and the three also finished as the top three in the discipline for the season, with Meillard snatching third from Steen Olsen.

== Standings ==
	Venue	27 Oct 2024; Sölden	8 Dec 2024; Beaver Creek	14 Dec 2024; Val d'Isère	22 Dec 2024; Alta Badia	12 Jan 2025; Adelboden	28 Jan 2025; Schladming	14 Feb 2025; Saalbach WC	1 Mar 2025; Kranjska Gora	15 Mar 2025; Hafjell	26 Mar 2025; Sun Valley	
#	Skier	(Austria)	(United States)	(France)	(Italy)	(Switzerland)	(Austria)	(Austria)	(Slovenia)	(Norway)	(United States)	Total
	(Switzerland) Marco Odermatt	DNF1	DNF2	100	100	100	60	④	60	80	80	580
2	(Norway) Henrik Kristoffersen	80	45	45	29	DNF2	80	⑧	100	15	60	454
3	(Switzerland) Loïc Meillard	DNS	20	29	15	80	50	③	40	100	100	434
4	(Norway) Alexander Steen Olsen	100	29	DNS	60	DNF2	100	DNF2	12	45	DNF1	346
5	(Brazil) Lucas Pinheiro Braathen	50	80	DNF2	9	DNF1	22	⑭	80	50	50	341
6	(Switzerland) Thomas Tumler	18	100	6	DNF2	50	12	②	32	60	20	298
7	(Austria) Stefan Brennsteiner	DNF1	26	60	18	DNF1	45	DNF1	50	40	45	284
8	(Slovenia) Žan Kranjec	40	60	32	36	18	36	⑪	15	4	36	277
9	(Croatia) Filip Zubčić	DNF2	40	26	50	45	29	⑬	22	32	18	262
10	(Italy) Luca De Aliprandini	26	32	40	20	60	18	⑨	DNF2	12	29	237
11	(United States) River Radamus	24	36	14	16	26	22	⑰	22	36	16	212
	(Norway) Timon Haugan	22	5	22	45	40	15	⑦	18	13	32	212
13	(Austria) Patrick Feurstein	32	DNQ	80	12	10	11	⑯	14	22	24	205
14	(Norway) Atle Lie McGrath	60	50	10	40	DNF2	26	⑩	DNQ	8	0	194
15	(France) Léo Anguenot	7	18	6	80	DNF1	16	⑮	DNF1	16	22	165
16	(France) Thibaut Favrot	16	24	9	26	20	32	⑥	24	11	0	162
17	(Austria) Marco Schwarz	DNS			5	29	24	⑤	45	18	40	161
18	(Andorra) Joan Verdú	DNS	16	36	DNF1	32	40	DNF2	29	DNF1	DNF2	153
19	(Belgium) Sam Maes	22	13	4	DNF1	13	14	㉕	26	29	DNF2	121
20	(Switzerland) Luca Aerni	DNS		50	14	36	9	DNF1	11	DNF2	DNF1	120
21	(Germany) Anton Grammel	DNQ	DNF1	DNQ	24	15	DNQ	⑫	16	26	26	107
22	(Italy) Alex Vinatzer	45	8	DNF1	32	13	DNQ	㉑	DNQ	DNF2	DNS	98
23	(Austria) Raphael Haaser	36	11	DNF1	DNS		11	①	36	DNF2	DNF2	94
24	(Switzerland) Gino Caviezel	29	14	24	22	DNS						89
25	(Germany) Alexander Schmid	15	22	16	DNS							53
26	(France) Alexis Pinturault	DNS	15	3	8	22	DNS				NE	48
27	(Norway) Rasmus Windingstad	11	DNQ	15	7	DNF1	4	DNS	DNF1	10	NE	47
28	(Italy) Filippo Della Vite	DNQ	DNF2	DNQ	DNF1	24	8	㉔	13	DNF2	NE	45
29	(Estonia) Tormis Laine	DNQ	DNQ	18	11	6	5	DNF1	4	DNQ	NE	44
30	(Germany) Fabian Gratz	DNQ	12	12	DNF1	7	0	⑱	6	6	NE	43
31	(Germany) Jonas Stockinger	6	7	11	DNQ	13	DNF1	㉖	DNQ	DNQ	NE	37
32	(Italy) Giovanni Borsotti	12	DNF1	20	DNF1	DNF2	3	DNS	DNQ	DNQ	NE	35
33	(Austria) Manuel Feller	DNF1	DNS	DNF2	DNQ	16	13	DNS	DNF2	5	NE	34
34	(Austria) Lukas Feurstein	DNQ	DNQ	DNQ	DNS	14	8	DNS	10	DNQ	NE	32
	(France) Alban Elezi Cannaferina	DNS		8	DNQ	DNQ	DNF1	DNS	DNQ	24	NE	32
36	(United States) Tommy Ford	10	DNF1	13	DNF1	DNF2	DNS				NE	23
37	(Sweden) William Hansson	13	6	DNF1	3	DNQ	DNF1	DNF2	DNF1	DNQ	NE	22
38	(France) Flavio Vitale	DNQ	DNS	DNF1	DNF1	DNQ	DNS		DNQ	20	DNF1	20
39	(Germany) Stefan Luitz	DNS	9	DNQ	DNQ	DNF1	2	DNS	8	DNQ	NE	19
40	(Austria) Noel Zwischenbrugger	DNS		DNQ	DNQ	9	DNQ	DNS	DNQ	9	NE	18
41	(United States) Patrick Kenney	DNQ	DNF2	DNF1	DNQ	8	DNQ	㉜	9	DNQ	NE	17
42	(Switzerland) Fadri Janutin	DNF2	10	DNQ	6	DNF1	DNQ	DNS	DNQ	DNQ	NE	16
43	(Switzerland) Justin Murisier	14	DNQ	DNS	DNQ	DNS					NE	14
	(Norway) Rasmus Bakkevig	DNS							DNF1	14	NE	14
45	(Slovakia) Andreas Žampa	DNQ	DNQ	DNQ	13	DNQ	DNQ	㉘	DNF1	DNQ	NE	13
46	(France) Loévan Parand	DNS				DNQ	DNQ	DNS	5	7	NE	12
47	(Canada) Erik Read	DNQ	DNQ	DNQ	11	DNQ	DNQ	㉒	DNQ	DNQ	NE	11
48	(France) Diego Orecchioni	DNQ	DNQ	DNF1	4	DNF1	6	DNS			NE	10
49	(Germany) Linus Straßer	9	DNS								NE	9
50	(Netherlands) Marcel Hirscher	8	DNS								NE	8
51	(Italy) Hannes Zingerle	DNQ	DNQ	7	DNQ	DNS					NE	7
	(United States) Bridger Gile	DNF1	DNF1	DNQ	DNQ	DNQ	DNQ	⑲	7	DNQ	NE	7
53	(France) Victor Muffat-Jeandet	5	DNQ	DNS							NE	5
54	(Switzerland) Livio Simonet	4	DNQ	DNF1	DNQ	DNQ	DNQ	DNS	DNQ	DNQ	NE	4
55	(France) Cyprien Sarrazin	3	DNF2	DNS							NE	3
	(Norway) Jesper Wahlqvist	DNQ	DNQ	DNQ	DNQ	DNQ	DNQ	DNS	DNQ	3	NE	3
57	(Sweden) Mattias Rönngren	DNQ	DNS	DNQ	2	DNQ	DNQ	DNS			NE	2
	References											

=== Legend ===
- Winner (100 points)
- 2nd place (80 points)
- 3rd place (60 points)
- DNQ = Did not qualify for run 2
- DNF1 = Did not finish run 1
- DSQ1 = Disqualified run 1
- DNF2 = Did not finish run 2
- DSQ2 = Disqualified run 2
- DNS2 = Did not start run 2
- Did not start (DNS)
- Not eligible for finals (NE)
- Race canceled (x)
- FIS non-World Cup race (World Championships)
- Updated at 26 March 2025, after all events.

== See also ==
- 2025 Alpine Skiing World Cup – Men's summary rankings
- 2025 Alpine Skiing World Cup – Men's overall
- 2025 Alpine Skiing World Cup – Men's downhill
- 2025 Alpine Skiing World Cup – Men's super-G
- 2025 Alpine Skiing World Cup – Men's slalom
- World Cup scoring system
