= 2025 Alpine Skiing World Cup – Men's slalom =

Alpine ski discipline year standings

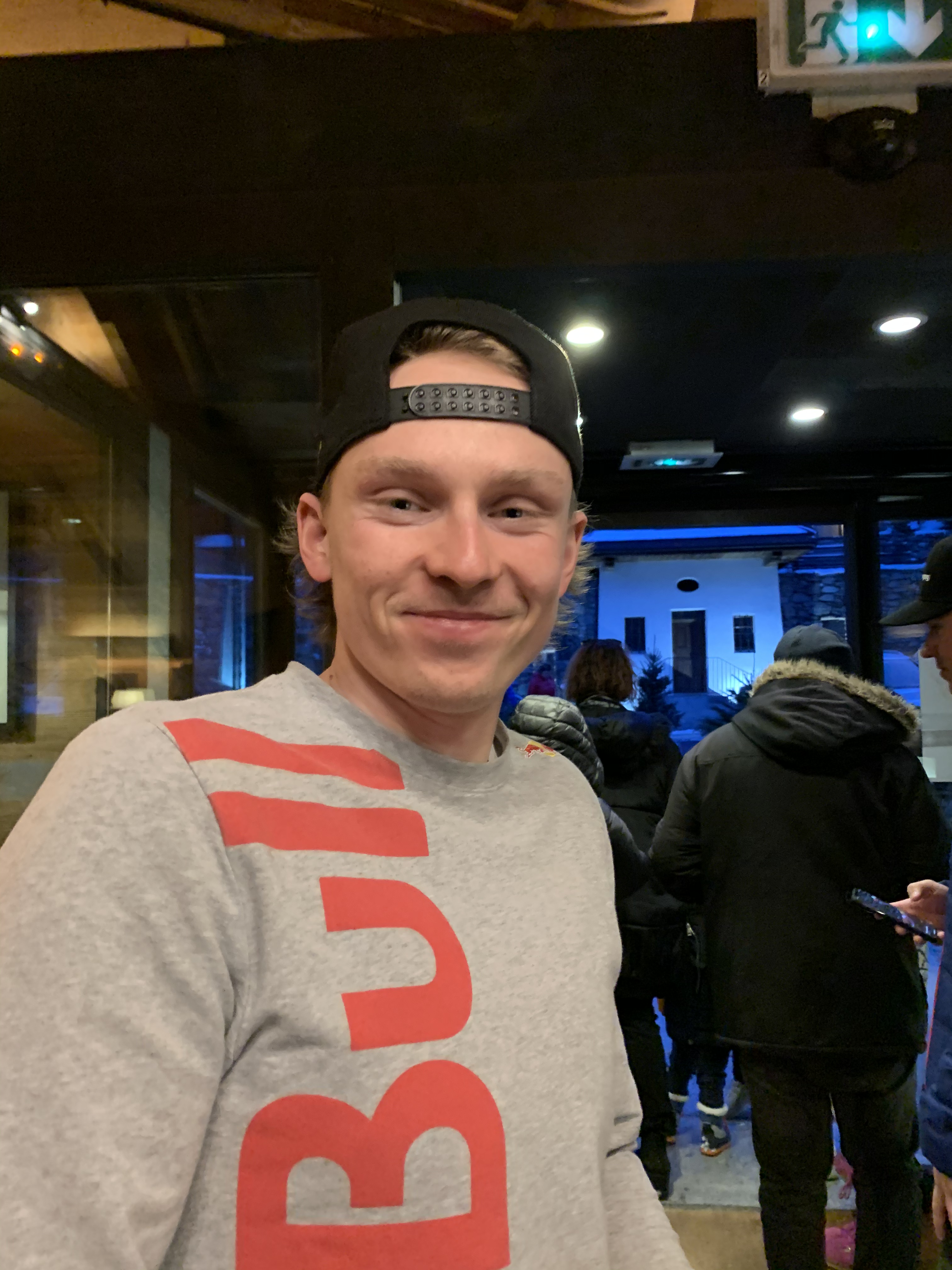
2025 Men's Slalom World Cup: Henrik Kristoffersen of Norway, discipline champion for the fourth time; 2025 Men's World Cup; Overall • Downhill • Super-G; Giant slalom • Slalom
| Previous: 2024 | Next: 2026 |

The men's slalom in the 2025 FIS Alpine Skiing World Cup consisted of twelve events, including the discipline final. The discipline opened the season in Levi, Finland, the first time that the men have raced there since before the pandemic (November 2019). Interestingly, with the return from retirement of Marcel Hirscher and Lucas Braathen, all of the discipline champions for the past 12 years are competing: Hirscher (6 discipline titles: 2013-15, 2017–19), Henrik Kristoffersen of Norway (3 titles: 2016, 2020, 2022), Marco Schwarz of Austria (1 title, 2021, but who did not return from an injury suffered in September until mid-December), Braathen (1 title, 2023), and defending champion Manuel Feller of Austria (1 title, 2024). Kristoffersen proved to be the only former champion in the mix for the season championship, and he held on through finals to claim the crystal globe for the discipline over Switzerland's Loïc Meillard.

The season was interrupted for the Alpine Skiing World Championships, this time in Saalbach, Austria during 4–16 February 2025. The championship in men's slalom was as the last skiing event of the championships, on Sunday, 16 February; Meillard finished a great run of success for the Swiss with a victory, his second gold and third medal of the championships . . . and the first win by a Swiss man in the slalom at the world championships since 1950.

== Season summary ==
In the opener at Levi, 2022 Olympic slalom gold medalist Clément Noël of France defeated all of the former champions for only his second victory on the World Cup circuit since the Olympics, chased most closely by Kristofferson, who posted the fastest second run. Noël then followed up that victory one week later at Gurgl, Austria, when he took a commanding lead after the first run and maintained the edge for his second straight win, with Kristoffersen the best placed of the former champions in sixth. Noël missed the next race due to injury, however, as did Hirscher (who suffered a season-ending injury, stopping his comeback), and after an almost two-year victory drought, Kristoffersen won the next slalom in Val d'Isére (France) to take over the lead in the discipline. The next race was the last of four straight races (one in each discipline) in northern Italy prior to Christmas, and Norway's Timon Haugan won in dominating fashion, with his teammate Kristoffersen (fourth) retaining the discipline lead.

In the first slalom in 2025, a night slalom held in Italy, Albert Popov of Bulgaria posted the top time in the second run and rose from eighth after the first run to record Bulgaria's second-ever World Cup victory (the first was also a slalom, exactly 45 years earlier (8 January 1980) by Petar Popangelov); meanwhile, Loïc Meillard of Switzerland was runner-up for the second consecutive slalom and edged Kristoffersen for the season lead. However, when Meillard failed to finish the first run in the next race at Adelboden (Switzerland), Noël's third victory of the season and Kristoffersen's podium finish (third) moved both of them ahead of him. In the last race before the world championships, a night slalom at Schlamding, Austria, Haugan came from second after the first run to pick up his second win of the season, and once again his countryman Kristoffersen took over the discipline lead in a race that he won.

At the world championships, Loïc Meillard of Switzerland, ranked third in the discipline for the season, picked up his first win of the season, followed closely by Atle Lie McGrath of Norway, with Germany's Linus Straßer in third. However, once the World Cup season resumed, Kristoffersen claimed his second victory of the season at Kranjska Gora and stretched his discipline lead to 77 points over Noël. But Meillard won the last race before finals at Hafjell, Norway (a day after winning the giant slalom on the same hill), with Kristoffersen fifth and Noël seventh, moving Meillard into second place in the discipline, 47 points behind Kristoffersen and 39 points ahead of Noël, leaving them as the only three potential discipline winners for the season.

== Finals ==
The World Cup finals in the discipline took place on Thursday, 27 March 2025 in Sun Valley, Idaho, United States. Only the top 25 skiers in the World Cup slalom discipline and the winner of the Junior World Championship in the discipline (Theodor Brækken of Norway), plus any skiers who have scored at least 500 points in the World Cup overall classification for the season, were eligible to compete in the final, and only the top 15 earned World Cup points. But no 500+ point skiers who weren't otherwise eligible chose to enter, and no eligible skier dropped out due to injury, so the starting field was 26 (including Brækken).

For Meillard to overtake Kristoffersen, he needed to finish no worse than fourth, and for all intents and purposes, the drama concerning the discipline winner ended after the first run, when Meillard finished over 1.5 seconds behind the leader and almost that far behind Kristoffersen. Even though Meillard recovered to post the fastest second-run time, he still finished just behind Kristoffersen in 5th, with Kristoffersen 4th, and had to settle for second place on the season; the race itself was decided by only 0.03 seconds in favor of Haugan over Noël, permitting Haugan to claim third for the season by three points over Noël (but still one point behind Meillard for second). In an illustration of the importance of high finishes, Noël won four races and Haugan three, while Kristoffersen only won two and Meillard one -- but Noël's podium in the finals was his only non-winning podium of the season (and no fourths or fifths), and Haugan only had two (and one fourth but no fifths), while Kristoffersen had three (plus two fourths and two fifths) and Meillard had four (plus one fourth and four fifths).

== Standings ==
| | Venue | 17 Nov 2024; Levi | 24 Nov 2024; Gurgl | 15 Dec 2024; Val d'Isère | 23 Dec 2024; Alta Badia | 8 Jan 2025; Madonna di Campiglio | 11 Jan 2025; Adelboden | 19 Jan 2025; Wengen | 26 Jan 2025; Kitzbühel | 29 Jan 2025; Schladming | 16 Feb 2025; Saalbach WC | 2 Mar 2025; Kranjska Gora | 16 Mar 2025; Hafjell | 27 Mar 2025; Sun Valley | |
| # | Skier | (Finland) | (Austria) | (France) | (Italy) | (Italy) | (Switzerland) | (Switzerland) | (Austria) | (Austria) | (Austria) | (Slovenia) | (Norway) | (United States) | Total |
| | (Norway) Henrik Kristoffersen | 80 | 40 | 100 | 50 | 45 | 60 | 60 | DNF1 | 32 | ⑬ | 100 | 45 | 50 | 662 |
| 2 | (Switzerland) Loïc Meillard | 60 | 45 | 60 | 80 | 80 | DNF1 | 45 | DNF2 | 45 | ① | 50 | 100 | 45 | 610 |
| 3 | (Norway) Timon Haugan | 18 | 29 | 32 | 100 | DNF1 | 20 | 80 | DNF2 | 100 | ⑤ | 80 | 50 | 100 | 609 |
| 4 | (France) Clément Noël | 100 | 100 | DNS | 40 | DNF1 | 100 | 24 | 100 | DNF2 | DNF2 | 26 | 36 | 80 | 606 |
| 5 | (Norway) Atle Lie McGrath | 22 | 60 | 80 | 60 | DNF2 | DNF1 | 100 | DNF2 | 40 | ② | 32 | 80 | DNF1 | 474 |
| 6 | (Brazil) Lucas Pinheiro Braathen | 50 | DNF1 | 50 | 22 | 29 | 80 | 22 | 60 | DNF1 | ⑬ | DNF1 | 60 | DSQ2 | 373 |
| 7 | (Austria) Fabio Gstrein | DNF1 | 29 | 13 | DNF1 | 26 | 45 | 18 | 32 | 60 | ⑪ | 36 | 40 | 60 | 359 |
| 8 | (Switzerland) Tanguy Nef | 45 | 9 | DNF2 | 9 | 16 | 32 | 50 | 36 | 24 | ⑨ | 45 | 32 | 29 | 327 |
| 9 | (Austria) Manuel Feller | DNF2 | DNF1 | 50 | 36 | DNF2 | DNF2 | 32 | 29 | 80 | ④ | 60 | DNF1 | 18 | 305 |
| | (Germany) Linus Straßer | 36 | DNQ | DNF2 | DNF2 | 40 | 50 | 20 | 45 | 50 | ③ | DNF1 | 24 | 40 | 305 |
| 11 | (France) Steven Amiez | 40 | 50 | DNF2 | DNF2 | 50 | 40 | 14 | 4 | 36 | ⑦ | 8 | DNF1 | 26 | 268 |
| 12 | (Bulgaria) Albert Popov | 13 | 13 | DNF2 | 26 | 100 | 15 | 26 | 18 | DNF2 | ⑱ | 18 | DNF2 | 0 | 229 |
| 13 | (Croatia) Samuel Kolega | 29 | 15 | 40 | 45 | 60 | DNF1 | 8 | 6 | 11 | ⑩ | DNF2 | 12 | DNF2 | 226 |
| 14 | (Switzerland) Daniel Yule | 9 | 20 | 11 | 29 | 36 | 22 | 40 | 24 | 18 | DNF2 | DNF2 | 8 | 0 | 217 |
| 15 | (United Kingdom) Dave Ryding | 15 | 36 | 29 | 32 | 18 | 4 | 12 | 15 | 15 | ⑥ | 7 | 14 | 0 | 197 |
| 16 | (Sweden) Kristoffer Jakobsen | 24 | 80 | DNF1 | DNF1 | DNF1 | 9 | 11 | 50 | DNF1 | DNF1 | 14 | DNF1 | DNF2 | 188 |
| 17 | (United States) Benjamin Ritchie | 20 | 10 | DNF1 | DNQ | 32 | 10 | 13 | 10 | 29 | DNF1 | DNF1 | 22 | 36 | 178 |
| 18 | (Italy) Alex Vinatzer | DNF1 | 14 | 26 | DNF1 | DSQ1 | 3 | DNQ | 80 | 22 | DNF2 | 29 | DNS | 0 | 174 |
| 19 | (France) Victor Muffat-Jeandet | DNQ | DNQ | 15 | DNQ | 11 | 24 | DNQ | 12 | 13 | ⑰ | 40 | 22 | 32 | 169 |
| 20 | (Croatia) Filip Zubčić | 26 | DNQ | 8 | 11 | DNQ | 36 | 9 | 26 | 12 | DNF2 | 6 | DNF1 | 20 | 154 |
| 21 | (Belgium) Armand Marchant | DNQ | 24 | 24 | DNF1 | DNF1 | 12 | 16 | DNF1 | 26 | DNS2 | 20 | 9 | 22 | 153 |
| 22 | (Austria) Dominik Raschner | 15 | 22 | DNF2 | DNF1 | 20 | DNF2 | 15 | 22 | DSQ1 | ⑧ | 16 | DNF1 | 24 | 134 |
| 23 | (France) Paco Rassat | DNF1 | 18 | DNF1 | 18 | 22 | DNF1 | 29 | 16 | 20 | DNF1 | DNF1 | DNF1 | DNF2 | 123 |
| 24 | (Austria) Johannes Strolz | DNQ | DNF1 | 18 | 10 | 24 | 16 | DNF1 | 22 | DNF2 | DNS | DNF1 | 11 | 16 | 119 |
| 25 | (Austria) Michael Matt | 6 | 2 | 16 | 15 | DNF2 | 29 | 10 | DNF1 | DNF1 | DNS | 22 | 5 | 0 | 105 |
| 26 | (Norway) Alexander Steen Olsen | 32 | 16 | DNS | 13 | DNF2 | 18 | DNF2 | 5 | DNF2 | DNF1 | DNF2 | 13 | NE | 97 |
| 27 | (Austria) Adrian Pertl | 16 | 11 | 20 | DNF2 | 15 | DNF2 | 7 | DNF1 | DNF1 | DNS | 11 | 6 | NE | 86 |
| 28 | (Austria) Marco Schwarz | DNS | | DNF2 | DNQ | DNF1 | 6 | 36 | 40 | DNF2 | DNF1 | DNF2 | DNF2 | NE | 82 |
| 29 | (Switzerland) Luca Aerni | DNQ | 7 | 13 | 14 | DNF1 | 11 | DNQ | DNQ | 6 | DNS | 13 | 10 | NE | 74 |
| 30 | (Switzerland) Marc Rochat | DNF1 | DNF1 | DNF1 | DNF1 | DNQ | 26 | 6 | 11 | 10 | ⑯ | 15 | 3 | NE | 71 |
| 31 | (Croatia) Istok Rodeš | 5 | DNF1 | DNF1 | 5 | DNQ | 8 | DNQ | DNQ | DNQ | DNF1 | 24 | 20 | NE | 62 |
| 32 | (Italy) Tobias Kastlunger | DNQ | 5 | 36 | 7 | DNQ | DNF1 | 4 | DNQ | 9 | DNF2 | DNQ | DNQ | NE | 61 |
| | (Italy) Stefano Gross | DNQ | 3 | 14 | DNQ | 10 | 13 | DNQ | DNQ | 8 | ⑳ | 13 | DNQ | NE | 61 |
| 34 | (United Kingdom) Laurie Taylor | DNQ | 8 | 22 | DNQ | DNQ | DNQ | DNQ | 15 | 14 | DNF2 | DNQ | DNF1 | NE | 59 |
| 35 | (Switzerland) Ramon Zenhäusern | 11 | 1 | DNQ | DNQ | DNQ | DNF1 | DNQ | 8 | DNQ | DNS | 11 | 26 | NE | 57 |
| 36 | (Finland) Eduard Hallberg | 7 | 32 | DNF2 | DNF1 | DNF1 | DSQ1 | DNF1 | DNQ | 16 | ⑫ | DNF1 | DNF1 | NE | 55 |
| | (United Kingdom) Billy Major | DNQ | DNF1 | DNQ | DNQ | DNQ | 5 | 5 | DNQ | 7 | ⑮ | 9 | 29 | NE | 55 |
| 38 | (United States) Jett Seymour | DNF1 | DNF1 | 10 | 18 | DNQ | 14 | 2 | DNQ | DNQ | ㉑ | DNF1 | 4 | NE | 48 |
| 39 | (Sweden) Fabian Ax Swartz | DNF2 | 4 | DNQ | 24 | 13 | DNF1 | DNQ | DNQ | DNF1 | DNF1 | DNQ | DNQ | NE | 41 |
| 40 | (Belgium) Sam Maes | DNQ | DNQ | DNS | DNF1 | 14 | DNF1 | 2 | DNF1 | DNQ | ⑲ | 5 | 15 | NE | 36 |
| 41 | (Austria) Joshua Sturm | 10 | 6 | DNF1 | 8 | DNF1 | DNQ | DNS | DNQ | DNQ | DNS | DNF1 | 7 | NE | 31 |
| 42 | (Estonia) Tormis Laine | 4 | DNQ | 9 | DNF1 | DNQ | 7 | DNF1 | 7 | DNQ | DNF2 | DNF1 | DNF1 | NE | 27 |
| 43 | (Spain) Joaquim Salarich | DNF1 | DNF1 | DNQ | 16 | DNF1 | DNQ | DNQ | DNQ | DNQ | DSQ1 | DNQ | DNQ | NE | 16 |
| | (Norway) Oscar Andreas Sandvik | DNF1 | DNS | | DNF1 | DNF1 | DNQ | DNS | DNF1 | DNF1 | DNS | DNF1 | 16 | NE | 16 |
| 45 | (France) Hugo Desgrippes | DNF1 | DNQ | DNF1 | DNF1 | DNF1 | DNQ | DNS | 13 | DNF1 | DNS | DNQ | DNQ | NE | 13 |
| 46 | (Norway) Sebastian Foss-Solevåg | 12 | DNF1 | DNQ | DNQ | DNF2 | DNQ | DNQ | DNF1 | DNQ | DNF1 | DNQ | DNQ | NE | 12 |
| | (Greece) AJ Ginnis | DNQ | 12 | DNS | | | | | | | | | | NE | 12 |
| | (Sweden) Gustav Wissting | DNS | | | DNQ | 12 | DNQ | DNQ | DNF1 | DNQ | ㉖ | DNF1 | DNQ | NE | 12 |
| 49 | (Italy) Simon Maurberger | DNS | | | 10 | DNQ | DNF1 | DNF1 | DNQ | DNQ | DNS | | | NE | 10 |
| | (Canada) Erik Read | DNF1 | DNQ | DNQ | DNF1 | DNQ | DNQ | DNQ | 10 | DNF1 | ㉔ | DNF1 | DNF1 | NE | 10 |
| 51 | (Germany) Anton Tremmel | DNF1 | DNQ | DNQ | 6 | DNQ | DNQ | 3 | DNQ | DNQ | DNS | DNF1 | DNQ | NE | 9 |
| 52 | (Norway) Eirik Hystad Solberg | 8 | DNQ | DNF1 | DNQ | DNF1 | DNQ | DNQ | DNQ | DNQ | DNS | DNQ | DNQ | NE | 8 |
| 53 | (United States) River Radamus | DNF1 | DNQ | DNF1 | 4 | DNS | DNQ | DNQ | DNS | DNF1 | DNF1 | DNS | DNF1 | NE | 4 |
| | References | | | | | | | | | | | | | | |

=== Legend ===
- Winner (100 points)
- 2nd place (80 points)
- 3rd place (60 points)
- DNQ = Did not qualify for run 2
- DNF1 = Did not finish run 1
- DSQ1 = Disqualified run 1
- DNF2 = Did not finish run 2
- DSQ2 = Disqualified run 2
- DNS2 = Did not start run 2
- Did not start (DNS)
- Not eligible for finals (NE)
- Race canceled (x)
- FIS non-World Cup race (World Championships)
- Updated at 27 March 2025, after all 12 events plus worlds

== See also ==
- 2025 Alpine Skiing World Cup – Men's summary rankings
- 2025 Alpine Skiing World Cup – Men's overall
- 2025 Alpine Skiing World Cup – Men's downhill
- 2025 Alpine Skiing World Cup – Men's super-G
- 2025 Alpine Skiing World Cup – Men's giant slalom
- World Cup scoring system
