= 2024–25 FIS Alpine Ski World Cup =

International sports competition

| Discipline | Men | Women |
| Overall | (Switzerland) Marco Odermatt (4) | (Italy) Federica Brignone (2) |
| Downhill | (Switzerland) Marco Odermatt (2) | (Italy) Federica Brignone (1) |
| Super-G | (Switzerland) Marco Odermatt (3) | (Switzerland) Lara Gut-Behrami (6) |
| Giant slalom | (Switzerland) Marco Odermatt (4) | (Italy) Federica Brignone (2) |
| Slalom | (Norway) Henrik Kristoffersen (4) | (Croatia) Zrinka Ljutić (1) |
| Nations Cup | Switzerland (11) | Italy (3) |
- Nations Cup Overall: Switzerland (12)

Competition
| Edition | 59th | 59th |
| Locations | 18 | 19 |
| Individual | 37 | 34 |
| Cancelled | 2 | 5 |
| Rescheduled | 3 | 3 |

Overall champions

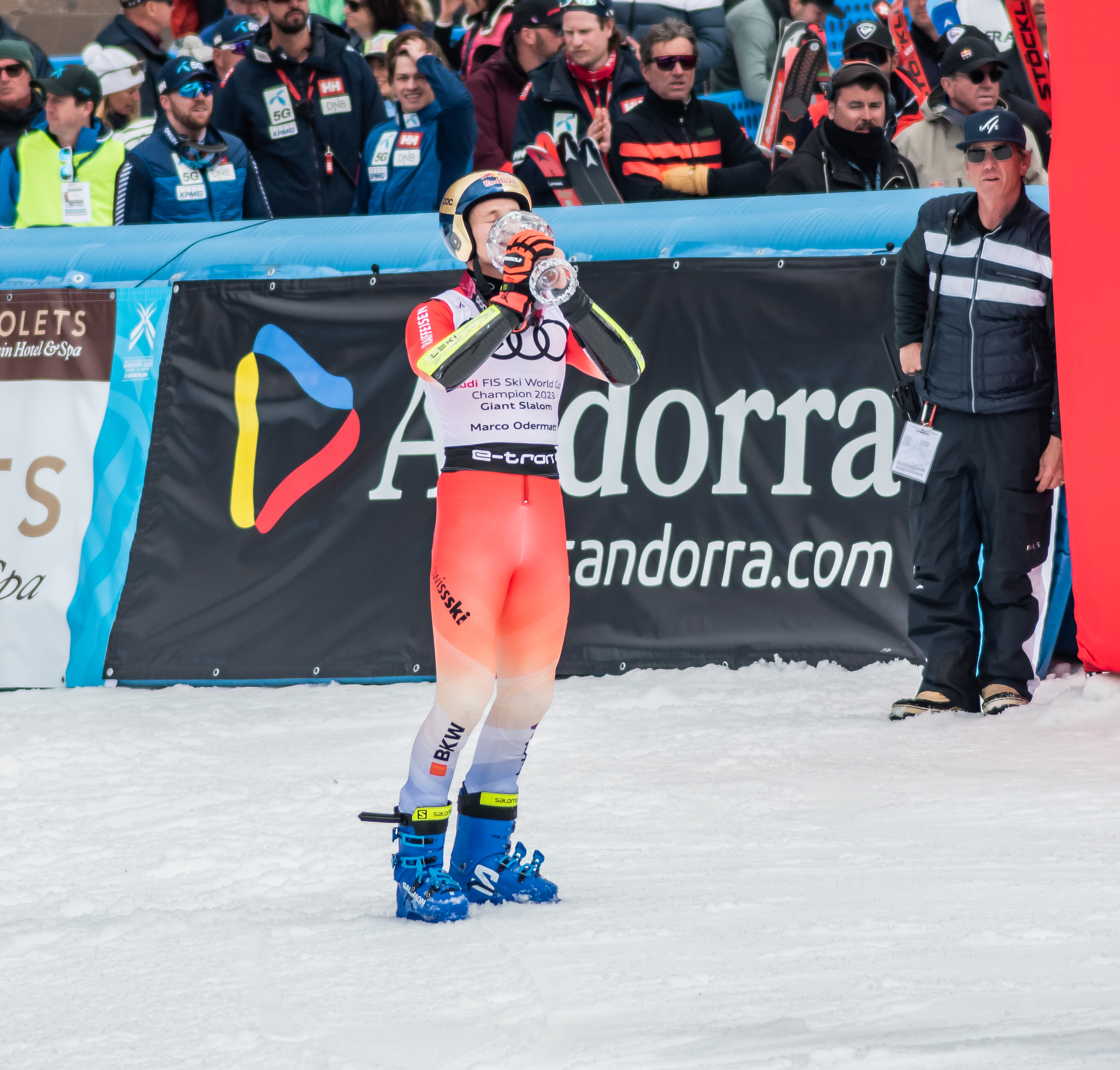
Marco Odermatt defended the World Cup title, securing it for the 4th consecutive time. He claimed 8 victories and also earned three small globes (Downhill, Super-G and Giant slalom).

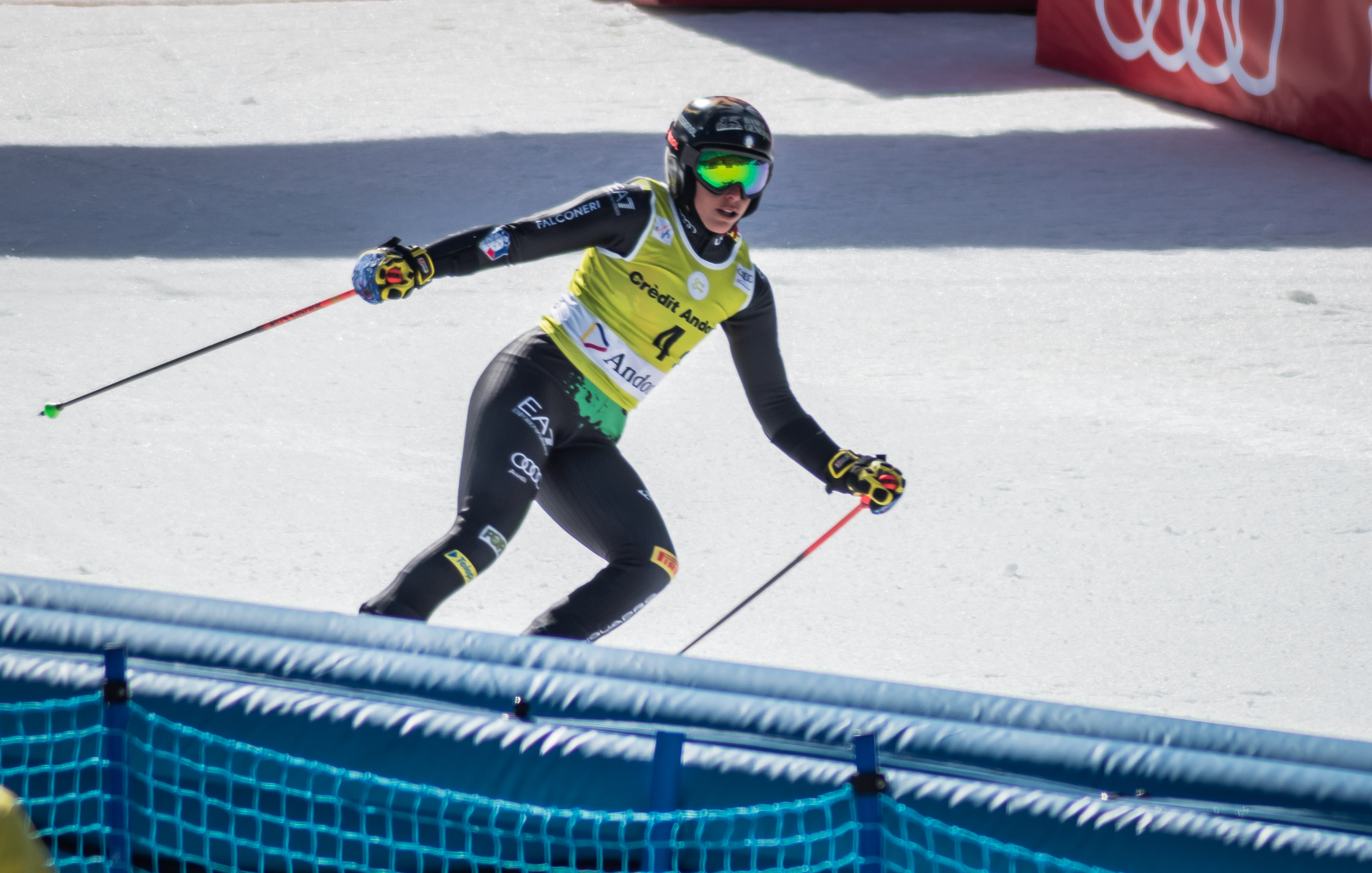
Federica Brignone won her 2nd overall World Cup title in history, winning previously in the 2019–20 season. She claimed 10 victories and captured two small globes (Downhill and Giant Slalom).

The 2024–25 FIS Alpine Ski World Cup, organised by the International Ski Federation (FIS), was the 59th World Cup season for men and women as the highest level of international alpine skiing competitions.

The season started on 26 October 2024 in Sölden, Austria, and concluded on 27 March 2025 at the finals in Sun Valley, United States.

The season took a break in February for the World Championships in Saalbach, Austria.

Marco Odermatt and Lara Gut-Behrami, both from Switzerland, were the reigning champions from the previous season. Odermatt successfully defended his title, claiming the crystal globe for the 4th consecutive time. Gut-Behrami finished the season in 2nd place, as Federica Brignone from Italy secured the women's overall title for the 2nd time in her career.

== Season overview ==
The provisional race calendar was published on 9 May 2024. As a result, the downhill race in Zermatt-Cervinia, which was criticized in previous seasons, was removed from the calendar. The final race calendar was published on 25 September.

This season marked the return of two renowned skiers to the men's World Cup tour, both of whom had previously announced their retirements. Austria's eight-time overall World Cup champion, Marcel Hirscher, made a comeback, now representing the Netherlands. Additionally, the 2022–23 World Cup slalom champion, Lucas Pinheiro Braathen, also made a comeback after switching his nationality from Norway to Brazil.

For the first time since the Super-G in Val Gardena in 2015, and for the first time ever in a Giant Slalom, three Norwegian athletes claimed all three spots on the podium. This happened again at the Slalom in Wengen.

Lara Colturi, representing Albania (SL in Gurgl), and Pinheiro Braathen, representing Brazil (GS in Beaver Creek), made history by securing their countries' first-ever World Cup podium finishes.

Tormis Laine representing Estonia (SL in Levi) scored the first World Cup points for his country.

At 35 years, 1 month, and 3 days old, Thomas Tumler set a new record as the oldest skier to win his first race in the giant slalom.

During the downhill race in St. Anton, Federica Brignone claimed victory, becoming the oldest alpine skier in World Cup history to win a downhill event. Meanwhile, Malorie Blanc secured second place in only her second World Cup appearance and her first World Cup downhill race.

On 23 February 2025, American skier Mikaela Shiffrin achieved her 100th World Cup victory by winning the slalom event in Sestriere, Italy. This milestone made her the first skier, male or female, to reach a triple-digit win count in World Cup history. Shiffrin's achievement came just months after a crash in November 2024 during a giant slalom race in Killington, where she sustained an abdominal puncture wound.

By securing 2nd place in the Super-G in Sun Valley on 23 March 2025, and 2565 days after her last podium finish, 40-year-old Lindsey Vonn became the oldest female athlete in World Cup history to stand on the podium.

== Map of world cup hosts ==
The following list contains all 31 World Cup hosts of the season.

Europe
| North Italy | Austria |
| North America | Switzerland |

== Men ==
The number of races in the World Cup history

| Total | DH | SG | GS | SL | AC | PS | PG | CE | K.O. | Winners |
|---|---|---|---|---|---|---|---|---|---|---|
| 1964 | 540 | 253 | 466 | 550 | 134 | 2 | 8 | 10 | 1 | 316 |

after final SL in Sun Valley (27 March 2025)

=== Calendar ===
Event key: DH – Downhill, SL – Slalom, GS – Giant slalom, SG – Super giant slalom
| All | No. | Date | Venue (slope %) | Type | Winner | Second | Third | Overall Leader | R. |
|---|---|---|---|---|---|---|---|---|---|
| 1928 | 1 | 27 October 2024 | (Austria) Sölden (Rettenbach 68.2%) | GS _{458} | (Norway) Alexander Steen Olsen | (Norway) Henrik Kristoffersen | (Norway) Atle Lie McGrath | (Norway) Alexander Steen Olsen | |
| 1929 | 2 | 17 November 2024 | (Finland) Levi (Levi Black 52%) | SL _{539} | (France) Clément Noël | (Norway) Henrik Kristoffersen | (Switzerland) Loïc Meillard | (Norway) Henrik Kristoffersen | |
| 1930 | 3 | 24 November 2024 | (Austria) Gurgl (Kirchenkar 62%) | SL _{540} | (France) Clément Noël | (Sweden) Kristoffer Jakobsen | (Norway) Atle Lie McGrath | (Norway) Henrik Kristoffersen (France) Clément Noël | |
| 1931 | 4 | 6 December 2024 | (United States) Beaver Creek (Birds of Prey 68%) | DH _{533} | (Switzerland) Justin Murisier | (Switzerland) Marco Odermatt | (Slovenia) Miha Hrobat | (Norway) Henrik Kristoffersen (France) Clément Noël | |
| 1932 | 5 | 7 December 2024 | (United States) Beaver Creek (Birds of Prey 68%) | SG _{246} | (Switzerland) Marco Odermatt | (France) Cyprien Sarrazin | (Austria) Lukas Feurstein | (Norway) Henrik Kristoffersen (France) Clément Noël | |
| 1933 | 6 | 8 December 2024 | (United States) Beaver Creek (Birds of Prey 68%) | GS _{459} | (Switzerland) Thomas Tumler | (Brazil) Lucas Pinheiro Braathen | (Slovenia) Žan Kranjec | (Norway) Henrik Kristoffersen | |
| 1934 | 7 | 14 December 2024 | (France) Val d'Isère (La face de Bellevarde 71%) | GS _{460} | (Switzerland) Marco Odermatt | (Austria) Patrick Feurstein | (Austria) Stefan Brennsteiner | (Norway) Henrik Kristoffersen | |
| 1935 | 8 | 15 December 2024 | (France) Val d'Isère (La face de Bellevarde 71%) | SL _{541} | (Norway) Henrik Kristoffersen | (Norway) Atle Lie McGrath | (Switzerland) Loïc Meillard | (Norway) Henrik Kristoffersen | |
| 1936 | 9 | 20 December 2024 | (Italy) Val Gardena/Gröden (Saslong 56.9%) | SG _{247} | (Italy) Mattia Casse | (United States) Jared Goldberg | (Switzerland) Marco Odermatt | (Norway) Henrik Kristoffersen | |
| 1937 | 10 | 21 December 2024 | (Italy) Val Gardena/Gröden (Saslong 56.9%) | DH _{534} | (Switzerland) Marco Odermatt | (Switzerland) Franjo von Allmen | (United States) Ryan Cochran-Siegle | (Switzerland) Marco Odermatt | |
| 1938 | 11 | 22 December 2024 | (Italy) Alta Badia (Gran Risa 69%) | GS _{461} | (Switzerland) Marco Odermatt | (France) Léo Anguenot | (Norway) Alexander Steen Olsen | (Switzerland) Marco Odermatt | |
| 1939 | 12 | 23 December 2024 | (Italy) Alta Badia (Gran Risa 69%) | SL _{542} | (Norway) Timon Haugan | (Switzerland) Loïc Meillard | (Norway) Atle Lie McGrath | (Switzerland) Marco Odermatt | |
| 1940 | 13 | 28 December 2024 | (Italy) Bormio (Stelvio 63%) | DH _{535} | (Switzerland) Alexis Monney | (Switzerland) Franjo von Allmen | (Canada) Cameron Alexander | (Switzerland) Marco Odermatt | |
| 1941 | 14 | 29 December 2024 | (Italy) Bormio (Stelvio 63%) | SG _{248} | (Norway) Fredrik Møller | (Austria) Vincent Kriechmayr | (Switzerland) Alexis Monney | (Switzerland) Marco Odermatt | |
| 1942 | 15 | 8 January 2025 | (Italy) Madonna di Campiglio (Note: Night event) (Canalone Miramonti 60%) | SL _{543} | (Bulgaria) Albert Popov | (Switzerland) Loïc Meillard | (Croatia) Samuel Kolega | (Switzerland) Marco Odermatt | |
| 1943 | 16 | (Note: The competition schedule has been changed due to unfavorable weather forecasts)11 January 2025 | (Switzerland) Adelboden (Chuenisbärgli 60%) | SL _{544} | (France) Clément Noël | (Brazil) Lucas Pinheiro Braathen | (Norway) Henrik Kristoffersen | (Switzerland) Marco Odermatt | |
| 1944 | 17 | 12 January 2025 | (Switzerland) Adelboden (Chuenisbärgli 60%) | GS _{462} | (Switzerland) Marco Odermatt | (Switzerland) Loïc Meillard | (Italy) Luca De Aliprandini | (Switzerland) Marco Odermatt | |
| 1945 | 18 | 17 January 2025 | (Switzerland) Wengen (Lauberhorn 90% – Speed) (Männlichen 72% – Technical) | SG _{249} | (Switzerland) Franjo von Allmen | (Austria) Vincent Kriechmayr | (Switzerland) Stefan Rogentin | (Switzerland) Marco Odermatt | |
| 1946 | 19 | 18 January 2025 | (Switzerland) Wengen (Lauberhorn 90% – Speed) (Männlichen 72% – Technical) | DH _{536} | (Switzerland) Marco Odermatt | (Switzerland) Franjo von Allmen | (Slovenia) Miha Hrobat | (Switzerland) Marco Odermatt | |
| 1947 | 20 | 19 January 2025 | (Switzerland) Wengen (Lauberhorn 90% – Speed) (Männlichen 72% – Technical) | SL _{545} | (Norway) Atle Lie McGrath | (Norway) Timon Haugan | (Norway) Henrik Kristoffersen | (Switzerland) Marco Odermatt | |
| 1948 | 21 | 24 January 2025 | (Austria) Kitzbühel (Streif 85% – Speed) (Ganslern 70% – Technical) | SG _{250} | (Switzerland) Marco Odermatt | (Austria) Raphael Haaser | (Switzerland) Stefan Rogentin | (Switzerland) Marco Odermatt | |
| 1949 | 22 | 25 January 2025 | (Austria) Kitzbühel (Streif 85% – Speed) (Ganslern 70% – Technical) | DH _{537} | (Canada) James Crawford | (Switzerland) Alexis Monney | (Canada) Cameron Alexander | (Switzerland) Marco Odermatt | |
| 1950 | 23 | 26 January 2025 | (Austria) Kitzbühel (Streif 85% – Speed) (Ganslern 70% – Technical) | SL _{546} | (France) Clément Noël | (Italy) Alex Vinatzer | (Brazil) Lucas Pinheiro Braathen | (Switzerland) Marco Odermatt | |
| 1951 | 24 | 28 January 2025 | (Austria) Schladming (Planai 54%) | GS _{463} | (Norway) Alexander Steen Olsen | (Norway) Henrik Kristoffersen | (Switzerland) Marco Odermatt | (Switzerland) Marco Odermatt | |
| 1952 | 25 | 29 January 2025 | (Austria) Schladming (Planai 54%) | SL _{547} | (Norway) Timon Haugan | (Austria) Manuel Feller | (Austria) Fabio Gstrein | (Switzerland) Marco Odermatt | |
| | | 2 February 2025 | (Germany) Garmisch-Partenkirchen (Kandahar 2 92%) | DH _{cnx} | cancelled due to bad weather conditions (moved to Kvitfjell on 7 March) | | | (Switzerland) Marco Odermatt | — |
48th FIS Alpine World Ski Championships 2025 (4–16 February • Saalbach, Austria)
| 1953 | 26 | 22 February 2025 | (Switzerland) Crans-Montana (Piste Nationale 61%) | DH _{538} | (Switzerland) Franjo von Allmen | (Switzerland) Marco Odermatt | (Switzerland) Alexis Monney | (Switzerland) Marco Odermatt | |
| 1954 | 27 | 23 February 2025 | (Switzerland) Crans-Montana (Piste Nationale 61%) | SG _{251} | (Switzerland) Marco Odermatt | (Switzerland) Alexis Monney | (Italy) Dominik Paris | (Switzerland) Marco Odermatt | |
| 1955 | 28 | 1 March 2025 | (Slovenia) Kranjska Gora (Podkoren 3 59%) | GS _{464} | (Norway) Henrik Kristoffersen | (Brazil) Lucas Pinheiro Braathen | (Switzerland) Marco Odermatt | (Switzerland) Marco Odermatt | |
| 1956 | 29 | 2 March 2025 | (Slovenia) Kranjska Gora (Podkoren 3 59%) | SL _{548} | (Norway) Henrik Kristoffersen | (Norway) Timon Haugan | (Austria) Manuel Feller | (Switzerland) Marco Odermatt | |
| 1957 | 30 | (Note: Men's cancelled competition from Garmisch-Partenkirchen was rescheduled to Kvitfjell on 7 March 2025)7 March 2025 | (Norway) Kvitfjell (Olympiabakken 64%) | DH _{539} | (Italy) Dominik Paris | (Switzerland) Marco Odermatt | (Switzerland) Stefan Rogentin | (Switzerland) Marco Odermatt | |
| 1958 | 31 | 8 March 2025 | (Norway) Kvitfjell (Olympiabakken 64%) | DH _{540} | (Switzerland) Franjo von Allmen | (Switzerland) Marco Odermatt | (Switzerland) Stefan Rogentin | (Switzerland) Marco Odermatt | |
| 1959 | 32 | 9 March 2025 | (Norway) Kvitfjell (Olympiabakken 64%) | SG _{252} | (Italy) Dominik Paris | (Canada) James Crawford | (Slovenia) Miha Hrobat | (Switzerland) Marco Odermatt | |
| 1960 | 33 | 15 March 2025 | (Norway) Hafjell (Olympia-løypa 52%) | GS _{465} | (Switzerland) Loïc Meillard | (Switzerland) Marco Odermatt | (Switzerland) Thomas Tumler | (Switzerland) Marco Odermatt | |
| 1961 | 34 | 16 March 2025 | (Norway) Hafjell (Olympia-løypa 52%) | SL _{549} | (Switzerland) Loïc Meillard | (Norway) Atle Lie McGrath | (Brazil) Lucas Pinheiro Braathen | (Switzerland) Marco Odermatt | |
World Cup Season Final
| | | 22 March 2025 | (United States) Sun Valley (Challenger 55% – Speed) (Greyhawk/Hemingway 56% – GS) (Greyhawk 38% – SL) | DH _{cnx} | cancelled due to strong wind | | | (Switzerland) Marco Odermatt | — |
| 1962 | 35 | 23 March 2025 | (United States) Sun Valley (Challenger 55% – Speed) (Greyhawk/Hemingway 56% – GS) (Greyhawk 38% – SL) | SG _{253} | (Austria) Lukas Feurstein | (Austria) Raphael Haaser | (Switzerland) Franjo von Allmen | (Switzerland) Marco Odermatt | |
| 1963 | 36 | 26 March 2025 | (United States) Sun Valley (Challenger 55% – Speed) (Greyhawk/Hemingway 56% – GS) (Greyhawk 38% – SL) | GS _{466} | (Switzerland) Loïc Meillard | (Switzerland) Marco Odermatt | (Norway) Henrik Kristoffersen | (Switzerland) Marco Odermatt | |
| 1964 | 37 | 27 March 2025 | (United States) Sun Valley (Challenger 55% – Speed) (Greyhawk/Hemingway 56% – GS) (Greyhawk 38% – SL) | SL _{550} | (Norway) Timon Haugan | (France) Clément Noël | (Austria) Fabio Gstrein | (Switzerland) Marco Odermatt | |
| 59th FIS World Cup Overall (27 October 2024 – 27 March 2025) | | | | | (Switzerland) Marco Odermatt | (Norway) Henrik Kristoffersen | (Switzerland) Loïc Meillard | | |

=== Rankings ===
==== Overall ====
| Rank | final standings after 37 events | Points |
|---|---|---|
| | (Switzerland) Marco Odermatt | 1721 |
| 2 | (Norway) Henrik Kristoffersen | 1116 |
| 3 | (Switzerland) Loïc Meillard | 1076 |
| 4 | (Switzerland) Franjo von Allmen | 836 |
| 5 | (Norway) Timon Haugan | 821 |

==== Downhill ====
| Rank | final standings after 8 events | Points |
|---|---|---|
| | (Switzerland) Marco Odermatt | 605 |
| 2 | (Switzerland) Franjo von Allmen | 522 |
| 3 | (Switzerland) Alexis Monney | 327 |
| 4 | (Slovenia) Miha Hrobat | 320 |
| 5 | (Canada) James Crawford | 270 |

==== Super-G ====
| Rank | final standings after 8 events | Points |
|---|---|---|
| | (Switzerland) Marco Odermatt | 536 |
| 2 | (Switzerland) Stefan Rogentin | 321 |
| 3 | (Austria) Vincent Kriechmayr | 317 |
| 4 | (Switzerland) Franjo von Allmen | 314 |
| 5 | (Norway) Fredrik Møller | 270 |

==== Giant slalom ====
| Rank | final standings after 9 events | Points |
|---|---|---|
| | (Switzerland) Marco Odermatt | 580 |
| 2 | (Norway) Henrik Kristoffersen | 454 |
| 3 | (Switzerland) Loïc Meillard | 434 |
| 4 | (Norway) Alexander Steen Olsen | 346 |
| 5 | (Brazil) Lucas Pinheiro Braathen | 341 |

==== Slalom ====
| Rank | final standings after 12 events | Points |
|---|---|---|
| | (Norway) Henrik Kristoffersen | 662 |
| 2 | (Switzerland) Loïc Meillard | 610 |
| 3 | (Norway) Timon Haugan | 609 |
| 4 | (France) Clément Noël | 606 |
| 5 | (Norway) Atle Lie McGrath | 474 |

==== Prize money ====
| Rank | final standings after 37 events | CHF |
|---|---|---|
| 1 | (Switzerland) Marco Odermatt | 725 640 |
| 2 | (Switzerland) Loïc Meillard | 376 550 |
| 3 | (Switzerland) Franjo von Allmen | 327 750 |
| 4 | (Norway) Henrik Kristoffersen | 304 000 |
| 5 | (France) Clément Noël | 279 500 |

== Women ==
The number of races in the World Cup history

| Total | DH | SG | GS | SL | AC | PS | PG | CE | K.O. | Winners |
|---|---|---|---|---|---|---|---|---|---|---|
| 1845 | 456 | 279 | 465 | 519 | 106 | 6 | 3 | 10 | 1 | 262 |

after final SL in Sun Valley (27 March 2025)

=== Calendar ===
Event key: DH – Downhill, SL – Slalom, GS – Giant slalom, SG – Super giant slalom
| All | No. | Date | Venue (slope %) | Type | Winner | Second | Third | Overall Leader | R. |
|---|---|---|---|---|---|---|---|---|---|
| 1812 | 1 | 26 October 2024 | (Austria) Sölden (Rettenbach 68.2%) | GS _{457} | (Italy) Federica Brignone | (New Zealand) Alice Robinson | (Austria) Julia Scheib | (Italy) Federica Brignone | |
| 1813 | 2 | 16 November 2024 | (Finland) Levi (Levi Black 52%) | SL _{510} | (United States) Mikaela Shiffrin | (Austria) Katharina Liensberger | (Germany) Lena Dürr | (United States) Mikaela Shiffrin | |
| 1814 | 3 | 23 November 2024 | (Austria) Gurgl (Kirchenkar 62%) | SL _{511} | (United States) Mikaela Shiffrin | (Albania) Lara Colturi | (Switzerland) Camille Rast | (United States) Mikaela Shiffrin | |
| 1815 | 4 | 30 November 2024 | (United States) Killington (Superstar 67%) | GS _{458} | (Sweden) Sara Hector | (Croatia) Zrinka Ljutić | (Switzerland) Camille Rast | (United States) Mikaela Shiffrin | |
| 1816 | 5 | 1 December 2024 | (United States) Killington (Superstar 67%) | SL _{512} | (Switzerland) Camille Rast | (Switzerland) Wendy Holdener (Sweden) Anna Swenn-Larsson | | (Switzerland) Camille Rast | |
| | | 7 December 2024 | (Canada) Tremblant (Flying Mile 42%) | GS _{cnx} | cancelled due to lack of snow (one race moved to Sestriere on 21 February) | | | (Switzerland) Camille Rast | — |
| | | 8 December 2024 | (Canada) Tremblant (Flying Mile 42%) | GS _{cnx} | cancelled due to lack of snow (one race moved to Sestriere on 21 February) | | | (Switzerland) Camille Rast | — |
| 1817 | 6 | 14 December 2024 | (United States) Beaver Creek (Birds of Prey 68%) | DH _{451} | (Austria) Cornelia Hütter | (Italy) Sofia Goggia | (Switzerland) Lara Gut-Behrami | (Switzerland) Camille Rast | |
| 1818 | 7 | 15 December 2024 | (United States) Beaver Creek (Birds of Prey 68%) | SG _{271} | (Italy) Sofia Goggia | (Switzerland) Lara Gut-Behrami | (Austria) Ariane Rädler | (Switzerland) Camille Rast | |
| 1819 | 8 | 21 December 2024 | (Switzerland) St. Moritz (Corviglia 61%) | SG _{272} | (Austria) Cornelia Hütter | (Switzerland) Lara Gut-Behrami | (Italy) Sofia Goggia | (Switzerland) Camille Rast | |
| | | 22 December 2024 | (Switzerland) St. Moritz (Corviglia 61%) | SG _{cnx} | cancelled due to strong wind and poor visibility (moved to La Thuile on 14 March) | | | (Switzerland) Camille Rast | — |
| 1820 | 9 | 28 December 2024 | (Austria) Semmering (Panorama 51%) | GS _{459} | (Italy) Federica Brignone | (Sweden) Sara Hector | (New Zealand) Alice Robinson | (Italy) Federica Brignone | |
| 1821 | 10 | 29 December 2024 | (Austria) Semmering (Panorama 51%) | SL _{513} | (Croatia) Zrinka Ljutić | (Germany) Lena Dürr | (Austria) Katharina Liensberger | (Switzerland) Camille Rast | |
| 1822 | 11 | 4 January 2025 | (Slovenia) Kranjska Gora (Podkoren 3 59%) | GS _{460} | (Sweden) Sara Hector | (Albania) Lara Colturi | (New Zealand) Alice Robinson | (Sweden) Sara Hector | |
| 1823 | 12 | 5 January 2025 | (Slovenia) Kranjska Gora (Podkoren 3 59%) | SL _{514} | (Croatia) Zrinka Ljutić | (Switzerland) Wendy Holdener | (Sweden) Anna Swenn-Larsson | (Croatia) Zrinka Ljutić | |
| 1824 | 13 | 11 January 2025 | (Austria) St. Anton (Karl-Schranz-Piste 78%) | DH _{452} | (Italy) Federica Brignone | (Switzerland) Malorie Blanc | (Czech Republic) Ester Ledecká | (Croatia) Zrinka Ljutić | |
| 1825 | 14 | 12 January 2025 | (Austria) St. Anton (Karl-Schranz-Piste 78%) | SG _{273} | (United States) Lauren Macuga | (Austria) Stephanie Venier | (Italy) Federica Brignone | (Italy) Federica Brignone | |
| 1826 | 15 | 14 January 2025 | (Austria) Flachau (Griessenkar 53%) | SL _{515} | (Switzerland) Camille Rast | (Switzerland) Wendy Holdener | (Sweden) Sara Hector | (Switzerland) Camille Rast | |
| 1827 | 16 | 18 January 2025 | (Italy) Cortina d'Ampezzo (Olimpia delle Tofane 73%) | DH _{453} | (Italy) Sofia Goggia | (Norway) Kajsa Vickhoff Lie | (Italy) Federica Brignone | (Italy) Federica Brignone | |
| 1828 | 17 | 19 January 2025 | (Italy) Cortina d'Ampezzo (Olimpia delle Tofane 73%) | SG _{274} | (Italy) Federica Brignone | (Switzerland) Lara Gut-Behrami | (Switzerland) Corinne Suter | (Italy) Federica Brignone | |
| 1829 | 18 | 21 January 2025 | (Italy) Kronplatz (Erta 61%) | GS _{461} | (New Zealand) Alice Robinson | (Switzerland) Lara Gut-Behrami | (United States) Paula Moltzan | (Italy) Federica Brignone | |
| 1830 | 19 | 25 January 2025 | (Germany) Garmisch-Partenkirchen (Kandahar 1 85%) | DH _{454} | (Italy) Federica Brignone | (Italy) Sofia Goggia | (Switzerland) Corinne Suter | (Italy) Federica Brignone | |
| 1831 | 20 | 26 January 2025 | (Germany) Garmisch-Partenkirchen (Kandahar 1 85%) | SG _{275} | (Switzerland) Lara Gut-Behrami | (Norway) Kajsa Vickhoff Lie | (Italy) Federica Brignone | (Italy) Federica Brignone | |
| 1832 | 21 | 30 January 2025 | (France) Courchevel (Stade Émile-Allais 58.5%) | SL _{516} | (Croatia) Zrinka Ljutić | (Sweden) Sara Hector | (Germany) Lena Dürr | (Italy) Federica Brignone | |
48th FIS Alpine World Ski Championships 2025 (4–16 February • Saalbach, Austria)
| 1833 | 22 | (Note: Women's cancelled competition from Tremblant was rescheduled to Sestriere on 21 February 2025)21 February 2025 | (Italy) Sestriere (Pista Gianni A. Agnelli 54%) | GS _{462} | (Italy) Federica Brignone | (New Zealand) Alice Robinson | (Norway) Thea Louise Stjernesund | (Italy) Federica Brignone | |
| 1834 | 23 | 22 February 2025 | (Italy) Sestriere (Pista Gianni A. Agnelli 54%) | GS _{463} | (Italy) Federica Brignone | (Switzerland) Lara Gut-Behrami | (New Zealand) Alice Robinson | (Italy) Federica Brignone | |
| 1835 | 24 | 23 February 2025 | (Italy) Sestriere (Pista Gianni A. Agnelli 54%) | SL _{517} | (United States) Mikaela Shiffrin (Note: Mikaela Shiffrin's 100th victory in World Cup history) | (Croatia) Zrinka Ljutić | (United States) Paula Moltzan | (Italy) Federica Brignone | |
| 1836 | 25 | 28 February 2025 | (Norway) Kvitfjell (Olympiabakken 64%) | DH _{455} | (Austria) Cornelia Hütter | (Germany) Emma Aicher | (United States) Breezy Johnson | (Italy) Federica Brignone | |
| 1837 | 26 | 1 March 2025 | (Norway) Kvitfjell (Olympiabakken 64%) | DH _{456} | (Germany) Emma Aicher | (United States) Lauren Macuga | (Austria) Cornelia Hütter | (Italy) Federica Brignone | |
| 1838 | 27 | 2 March 2025 | (Norway) Kvitfjell (Olympiabakken 64%) | SG _{276} | (Italy) Federica Brignone | (Switzerland) Lara Gut-Behrami | (Italy) Sofia Goggia | (Italy) Federica Brignone | |
| 1839 | 28 | 8 March 2025 | (Sweden) Åre (Störtloppsbacken) | GS _{464} | (Italy) Federica Brignone | (New Zealand) Alice Robinson | (Albania) Lara Colturi | (Italy) Federica Brignone | |
| 1840 | 29 | 9 March 2025 | (Sweden) Åre (Störtloppsbacken) | SL _{518} | (Austria) Katharina Truppe | (Austria) Katharina Liensberger | (United States) Mikaela Shiffrin | (Italy) Federica Brignone | |
| | | 13 March 2025 | (Italy) La Thuile (3 Franco Berthod 76%) | DH _{cnx} | cancelled due to unfavourable weather conditions | | | (Italy) Federica Brignone | — |
| 1841 | 30 | (Note: The competition schedule has been changed due to unfavorable weather forecasts)13 March 2025 | (Italy) La Thuile (3 Franco Berthod 76%) | SG _{277} | (Germany) Emma Aicher | (Italy) Sofia Goggia | (Italy) Federica Brignone | (Italy) Federica Brignone | |
| 1842 | 31 | (Note: Women's cancelled Super-G from St. Moritz was rescheduled to La Thuile on 14 March 2025)14 March 2025 | (Italy) La Thuile (3 Franco Berthod 76%) | SG _{278} | (Italy) Federica Brignone | (Italy) Sofia Goggia | (France) Romane Miradoli | (Italy) Federica Brignone | |
World Cup Season Final
| | | 22 March 2025 | (United States) Sun Valley (Challenger 55% – Speed) (Greyhawk/Hemingway 56% – GS) (Greyhawk 38% – SL) | DH _{cnx} | cancelled due to strong wind | | | (Italy) Federica Brignone | — |
| 1843 | 32 | 23 March 2025 | (United States) Sun Valley (Challenger 55% – Speed) (Greyhawk/Hemingway 56% – GS) (Greyhawk 38% – SL) | SG _{279} | (Switzerland) Lara Gut-Behrami | (United States) Lindsey Vonn | (Italy) Federica Brignone | (Italy) Federica Brignone | |
| 1844 | 33 | 25 March 2025 | (United States) Sun Valley (Challenger 55% – Speed) (Greyhawk/Hemingway 56% – GS) (Greyhawk 38% – SL) | GS _{465} | (Switzerland) Lara Gut-Behrami | (Italy) Federica Brignone | (Sweden) Sara Hector | (Italy) Federica Brignone | |
| 1845 | 34 | 27 March 2025 | (United States) Sun Valley (Challenger 55% – Speed) (Greyhawk/Hemingway 56% – GS) (Greyhawk 38% – SL) | SL _{519} | (United States) Mikaela Shiffrin | (Germany) Lena Dürr | (Slovenia) Andreja Slokar | (Italy) Federica Brignone | |
| 59th FIS World Cup Overall (26 October 2024 – 27 March 2025) | | | | | (Italy) Federica Brignone | (Switzerland) Lara Gut-Behrami | (Italy) Sofia Goggia | | |

=== Rankings ===
==== Overall ====
| Rank | final standings after 34 events | Points |
|---|---|---|
| | (Italy) Federica Brignone | 1594 |
| 2 | (Switzerland) Lara Gut-Behrami | 1272 |
| 3 | (Italy) Sofia Goggia | 931 |
| 4 | (Croatia) Zrinka Ljutić | 816 |
| 5 | (Sweden) Sara Hector | 752 |

==== Downhill ====
| Rank | final standings after 6 events | Points |
|---|---|---|
| | (Italy) Federica Brignone | 384 |
| 2 | (Austria) Cornelia Hütter | 368 |
| 3 | (Italy) Sofia Goggia | 350 |
| 4 | (United States) Lauren Macuga | 230 |
| 5 | (Switzerland) Lara Gut-Behrami | 229 |

==== Super-G ====
| Rank | final standings after 9 events | Points |
|---|---|---|
| | (Switzerland) Lara Gut-Behrami | 665 |
| 2 | (Italy) Federica Brignone | 630 |
| 3 | (Italy) Sofia Goggia | 466 |
| 4 | (Norway) Kajsa Vickhoff Lie | 317 |
| 5 | (Italy) Elena Curtoni | 284 |

==== Giant slalom ====
| Rank | final standings after 9 events | Points |
|---|---|---|
| | (Italy) Federica Brignone | 580 |
| 2 | (New Zealand) Alice Robinson | 520 |
| 3 | (Sweden) Sara Hector | 447 |
| 4 | (Norway) Thea Louise Stjernesund | 381 |
| 5 | (Albania) Lara Colturi | 379 |

==== Slalom ====
| Rank | final standings after 10 events | Points |
|---|---|---|
| | (Croatia) Zrinka Ljutić | 541 |
| 2 | (Austria) Katharina Liensberger | 509 |
| 3 | (Switzerland) Camille Rast | 492 |
| 4 | (United States) Mikaela Shiffrin | 486 |
| 5 | (Germany) Lena Dürr | 473 |

==== Prize money ====
| Rank | final standings after 34 events | CHF |
|---|---|---|
| 1 | (Italy) Federica Brignone | 679 100 |
| 2 | (Switzerland) Lara Gut-Behrami | 356 190 |
| 3 | (Italy) Sofia Goggia | 262 690 |
| 4 | (Switzerland) Camille Rast | 245 200 |
| 5 | (Croatia) Zrinka Ljutić | 233 000 |

== Nations Cup ==
Overall

| Rank | final standings after 71 events | Points |
|---|---|---|
| 1 | Switzerland | 10823 |
| 2 | Austria | 7459 |
| 3 | Italy | 6399 |
| 4 | Norway | 5098 |
| 5 | United States | 4179 |

Men

| Rank | final standings after 37 events | Points |
|---|---|---|
| 1 | Switzerland | 6695 |
| 2 | Austria | 3967 |
| 3 | Norway | 3735 |
| 4 | France | 2575 |
| 5 | Italy | 2143 |

Women

| Rank | final standings after 34 events | Points |
|---|---|---|
| 1 | Italy | 4256 |
| 2 | Switzerland | 4128 |
| 3 | Austria | 3492 |
| 4 | United States | 2904 |
| 5 | Sweden | 1554 |

== Podium table by nation ==
Table showing the World Cup podium places (gold–1st place, silver–2nd place, bronze–3rd place) by the countries represented by the athletes.

| Rank | Nation | Gold | Silver | Bronze | Total |
|---|---|---|---|---|---|
| 1 | Switzerland | 22 | 24 | 18 | 64 |
| 2 | Italy | 15 | 6 | 9 | 30 |
| 3 | Norway | 10 | 9 | 8 | 27 |
| 4 | Austria | 5 | 9 | 9 | 23 |
| 5 | United States | 5 | 3 | 5 | 13 |
| 6 | France | 4 | 3 | 1 | 8 |
| 7 | Croatia | 3 | 2 | 1 | 6 |
| 8 | Sweden | 2 | 4 | 3 | 9 |
| 9 | Germany | 2 | 3 | 2 | 7 |
| 10 | New Zealand | 1 | 3 | 3 | 7 |
| 11 | Canada | 1 | 1 | 2 | 4 |
| 12 | Bulgaria | 1 | 0 | 0 | 1 |
| 13 | Brazil | 0 | 3 | 2 | 5 |
| 14 | Albania | 0 | 2 | 1 | 3 |
| 15 | Slovenia | 0 | 0 | 5 | 5 |
| 16 | Czech Republic | 0 | 0 | 1 | 1 |
| Totals (16 entries) | | 71 | 72 | 70 | 213 |

== Points distribution ==
The table shows the number of points won in the 2024–25 FIS Alpine Ski World Cup for men and women.

| Place | 1 | 2 | 3 | 4 | 5 | 6 | 7 | 8 | 9 | 10 | 11 | 12 | 13 | 14 | 15 | 16 | 17 | 18 | 19 | 20 | 21 | 22 | 23 | 24 | 25 | 26 | 27 | 28 | 29 | 30 |
| World Cup | 100 | 80 | 60 | 50 | 45 | 40 | 36 | 32 | 29 | 26 | 24 | 22 | 20 | 18 | 16 | 15 | 14 | 13 | 12 | 11 | 10 | 9 | 8 | 7 | 6 | 5 | 4 | 3 | 2 | 1 |
| World Cup Finals | 100 | 80 | 60 | 50 | 45 | 40 | 36 | 32 | 29 | 26 | 24 | 22 | 20 | 18 | 16 | —N/a |

== Achievements ==
First World Cup career victory

Men

- (Switzerland) Justin Murisier (32), in his 13th season – DH in Beaver Creek
- (Switzerland) Thomas Tumler (35), in his 14th season – GS in Beaver Creek
- (Italy) Mattia Casse (34), in his 15th season – SG in Val Gardena/Gröden
- (Switzerland) Alexis Monney (24), in his 4th season – DH in Bormio
- (Norway) Fredrik Møller (24), in his 2nd season – SG in Bormio
- (Bulgaria) Albert Popov (27), in his 11th season – SL in Madonna di Campiglio
- (Switzerland) Franjo von Allmen (23), in his 3rd season – SG in Wengen
- (Canada) James Crawford (27), in his 9th season – DH in Kitzbühel
- (Austria) Lukas Feurstein (23), in his 5th season – SG in Sun Valley

Women

- (Switzerland) Camille Rast (25), in her 8th season – SL in Killington
- (Croatia) Zrinka Ljutić (20), in her 5th season – SL in Semmering
- (United States) Lauren Macuga (22), in her 4th season – SG in St. Anton
- (Germany) Emma Aicher (21), in her 4th season – DH in Kvitfjell
- (Austria) Katharina Truppe (29), in her 11th season – SL in Åre

First World Cup podium

Men

- (Switzerland) Alexis Monney (24), in his 4th season – DH in Bormio – 1st place
- (Norway) Fredrik Møller (24), in his 2nd season – SG in Bormio – 1st place
- (Austria) Patrick Feurstein (28), in his 6th season – GS in Val d'Isere – 2nd place
- (United States) Jared Goldberg (33), in his 13th season – SG in Val Gardena/Gröden – 2nd place
- (France) Léo Anguenot (26), in his 7th season – GS in Alta Badia – 2nd place
- (Slovenia) Miha Hrobat (29), in his 11th season – DH in Beaver Creek – 3rd place
- (Austria) Lukas Feurstein (23), in his 5th season – SG in Beaver Creek – 3rd place
- (Croatia) Samuel Kolega (25), in his 10th season – SL in Madonna di Campiglio – 3rd place
- (Austria) Fabio Gstrein (27), in his 8th season – SL in Schladming – 3rd place

Women

- (United States) Lauren Macuga (22), in her 4th season – SG in St. Anton – 1st place
- (Albania) Lara Colturi (18), in her 3rd season – SL in Gurgl – 2nd place
- (Switzerland) Malorie Blanc (21), in her 1st season – DH in St. Anton – 2nd place
- (Germany) Emma Aicher (21), in her 4th season – DH in Kvitfjell – 2nd place
- (Austria) Julia Scheib (26), in her 7th season – GS in Sölden – 3rd place
- (Switzerland) Camille Rast (25), in her 8th season – SL in Gurgl – 3rd place

Number of wins this season (in brackets are all-time wins)

Men

- (Switzerland) Marco Odermatt – 8 (45)
- (France) Clément Noël – 4 (14)
- (Norway) Henrik Kristoffersen – 3 (33)
- (Switzerland) Loïc Meillard – 3 (7)
- (Norway) Timon Haugan – 3 (4)
- (Switzerland) Franjo von Allmen – 3 (3)
- (Italy) Dominik Paris – 2 (24)
- (Norway) Alexander Steen Olsen – 2 (3)
- (Norway) Atle Lie McGrath – 1 (3)
- (Switzerland) Justin Murisier – 1 (1)
- (Switzerland) Thomas Tumler – 1 (1)
- (Italy) Mattia Casse – 1 (1)
- (Switzerland) Alexis Monney – 1 (1)
- (Norway) Fredrik Møller – 1 (1)
- (Bulgaria) Albert Popov – 1 (1)
- (Canada) James Crawford – 1 (1)
- (Austria) Lukas Feurstein – 1 (1)

Women

- (Italy) Federica Brignone – 10 (37)
- (United States) Mikaela Shiffrin – 4 (101) (Note: All-time record in World Cup history after the season)
- (Switzerland) Lara Gut-Behrami – 3 (48)
- (Austria) Cornelia Hütter – 3 (9)
- (Croatia) Zrinka Ljutić – 3 (3)
- (Italy) Sofia Goggia – 2 (26)
- (Sweden) Sara Hector – 2 (7)
- (Switzerland) Camille Rast – 2 (2)
- (Germany) Emma Aicher – 2 (2)
- (New Zealand) Alice Robinson – 1 (4)
- (United States) Lauren Macuga – 1 (1)
- (Austria) Katharina Truppe – 1 (1)

== Retirements ==
The following notable skiers, who competed in the World Cup, retired during or after the 2024–25 season:

Men

- (Switzerland) Yannick Chabloz
- (France) Mathieu Faivre
- (Norway) Sebastian Foss-Solevåg
- (Liechtenstein) Nico Gauer
- (Italy) Stefano Gross
- (Slovenia) Boštjan Kline
- (Switzerland) Urs Kryenbühl
- (Germany) Stefan Luitz
- (Germany) Adrian Meisen
- (Switzerland) Reto Schmidiger
- (Germany) Dominik Schwaiger
- (Norway) Rasmus Windingstad

Women

- (Austria) Michelle Niederwieser
- (Germany) Roni Remme
- (Sweden) Charlotta Säfvenberg
- (Germany) Anna Schillinger
- (Switzerland) Elena Stoffel
- (Austria) Tamara Tippler
- (Italy) Vera Tschurtschenthaler
- (Austria) Stephanie Venier

== Comebacks ==
The following notable skiers, who competed in the World Cup, resumed their careers for the 2024–25 season after retiring before.

Men

- (Netherlands) Marcel Hirscher (initially retired in 2019)
- (Brazil) Lucas Pinheiro Braathen (initially retired in 2023)

Women

- (United States) Lindsey Vonn (initially retired in 2019)

== See also ==
- 2024–25 FIS Alpine Ski Europa Cup
