= William Hansson =

Swedish alpine skier (born 2001)

Personal information
- Born: 19 June 2001 (age 25)

Skiing career
- Sport: Alpine skiing
- Club: Mälaröarnas Alpina
- Disciplines: Giant slalom, slalom

World Championships
- Teams: 1 – (2021, 2025)
- Medals: 2 (0 gold)
Medal record
Men's alpine skiing
Representing Sweden
World Championships
Silver medal – second place	2021 Cortina d’Ampezzo	Team event
Bronze medal – third place	2025 Saalbach	Team event

William Hansson (born 19 June 2001) is a Swedish World Cup alpine ski racer.

He represented Sweden at the FIS Alpine World Ski Championships 2021, and was part of the Swedish team that earned a silver medal in the combined men's and women's team competition.
