= Filippo Della Vite =

Italian alpine skier

Personal information
- Born: 4 October 2001 (age 24) Bergamo, Italy
- Height: 1.72 m (5 ft 8 in)

Skiing career
- Sport: Alpine skiing
- Club: G.S. Fiamme Oro
- Disciplines: Technical events
- World Cup debut: 2018

World Championships
- Teams: 2 − (2023, 2025)
- Medals: 1 (1 gold)

World Cup
- Seasons: 6
Medal record
Men's alpine skiing
Representing Italy
World Championships
Gold medal – first place	2025 Saalbach	Team event
Junior World Championships
Silver medal – second place	2022 Panorama	Giant slalom

Filippo "Pippo" Della Vite (born 4 October 2001) is an Italian alpine skier.

== Career ==
During his career, he has achieved four results among the top 15 in the FIS Alpine Ski World Cup. On February 4, 2025, together with Giorgia Collomb, Lara Della Mea and Alex Vinatzer, he won the gold medal in the team competition at the World Championships in Saalbach-Hinterglemm.

== World Cup results ==
Top 15

Date	Place	Discipline	Rank
10 December 2022	(France) Val d'Isere	Giant slalom	12
19 December 2022	(Italy) Alta Badia	Giant slalom	13
7 January 2023	(Switzerland) Adelboden	Giant slalom	11
25 February 2023	(United States) Palisades Tahoe	Giant slalom	12
11 March 2023	(Slovenia) Kranjska Gora	Giant slalom	14
12 March 2023	(Slovenia) Kranjska Gora	Giant slalom	6
18 March 2023	(Andorra) Soldeu	Giant slalom	7

== World Championship results ==
Year	Age	Slalom	Giant slalom	Super-G	Downhill	Combined	Parallel	Team event
2023	21	—	10	—	—	—	16	8
2025	23	—	—	—	—	—N/a	—N/a	1
