= 2025 Alpine Skiing World Cup – Men's super-G =

Alpine ski discipline year standings

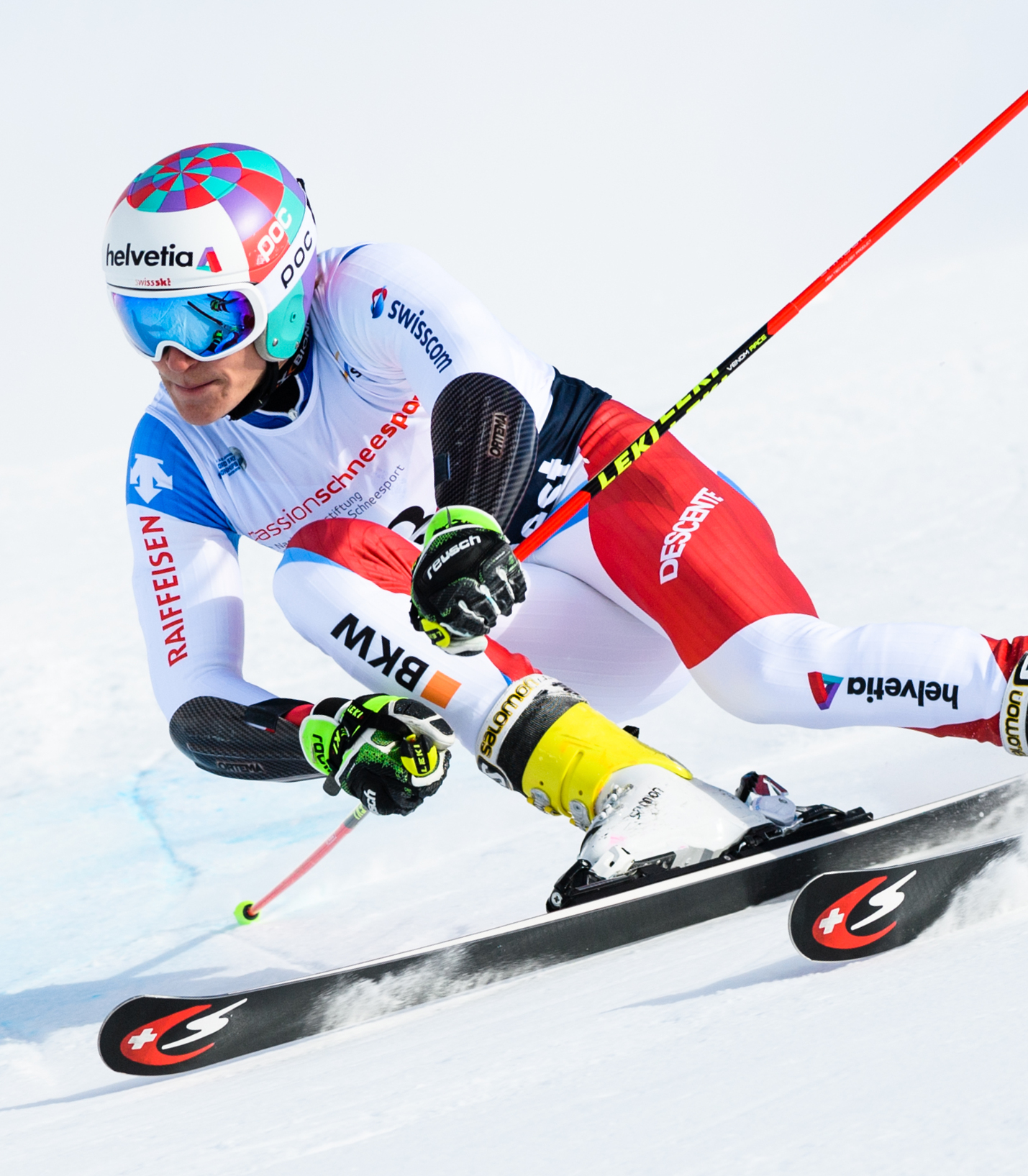
2025 Men's Super-G World Cup: Marco Odermatt of Switzerland, discipline champion for the third straight season; 2025 Men's World Cup; Overall • Downhill • Super-G; Giant slalom • Slalom
Previous: 2024	Next: 2026

The men's super-G in the 2025 Alpine Skiing World Cup consisted of eight events, including the final. The first event of the season did not take place until 6 December 2024 in Beaver Creek. Marco Odermatt of Switzerland, the two-time defending champion in the discipline, was the only skier with multiple race wins in the discipline and thus easily won his third straight championship.

The season was interrupted for the Alpine Skiing World Championships, this time in Saalbach, Austria during 4–16 February 2025. The championship in men's super-G took place on Friday, 7 February, and also was won by Odermatt.

== Season summary ==
The first super-G of the season was held in Beaver Creek (Colorado), USA in December 2024, and Marco Odermatt of Switzerland, two-time defending champion in the discipline, recorded his first victory of the season over one of his principal rivals from the previous season, Cyprien Sarrazin of France. The next two giant slaloms were scheduled for Italy; in the first, Italy's Mattia Casse, who had never before won a World Cup race, edged out American Jared Goldberg by 1/100 of a second to earn the victory and move into second in the discipline behind Odermatt, who finished third. In the last race before New Year's Day, Norway's Fredrik Møller recorded his first World Cup victory, edging Vincent Kriechmayr of Austria, but Odermatt's fifth-place finish allowed him to retain the discipline lead by five points over Møller.

The first super-G in 2025 took place in Wngen, Switzerland, and Odermatt only managed to finish seventh, his first time outside the top 5 in a super-G in almost three years (since March 2022), but his young Swiss teammate Franjo von Allmen edged Kriechmayr to provide the Swiss fans with a home winner. Odermatt recovered the next week to win the super-G at Kitzbühel, Austria -- his first victory there in any discipline. Building on this success, Odermatt then won the super-G World Championship by a full second over Austria's Raphael Haaser, which was the largest winning margin in a speed race (downhill of super-G) at the World Championships since 1991. Odermatt then won his third consecutive super-G by prevailing at Crans Montana, building an almost insurmountable lead in the discipline for the season. In the last race before finals, at Kvitfjell, Norway, Odermatt clinched the discipline championship when Casse, the only racer with a theoretical chance of catching him, was unable to start due to injuries; however, Italy's Dominik Paris, the discipline champion in 2019, came through with a victory two days after winning a downhill on the same course -- which left seven racers, including Paris, battling for the two podium steps behind Odermatt at finals.

== Finals ==
The World Cup finals in the discipline took place on Sunday, 23 March 2025 in Sun Valley, Idaho, United States. Only the top 25 skiers in the World Cup slalom discipline and the winner of the Junior World Championship in the discipline (Benno Brandis of Germany), plus any skiers who have scored at least 500 points in the World Cup overall classification for the season, were eligible to compete in the final, and only the top 15 earned World Cup points. Only one 500+-point skier who wasn't otherwise eligible (Loïc Meillard of Switzerland) entered the race, and three eligible skiers (Mattia Casse of Italy, Cameron Alexander of Canada, and Cyprien Sarrazin of France) were unable to compete due to injury, thus setting the field for finals at 24 skiers (including Brandis). In a significant upset, 23-year-old Austrian Lukas Feurstein won his first World Cup race (and the first for Austria in the entire men's season in any discipline) on the new Sun Valley speed course, which both Feurstein and fellow podium finisher Franjo von Allmen of Switzerland described as utilizing more turns than a normal men's super-G course.

== Standings ==
	Venue	7 Dec 2024; Beaver Creek	20 Dec 2024; Val Gardena/Gröden	29 Dec 2024; Bormio	17 Jan 2025; Wengen	24 Jan 2025; Kitzbühel	7 Feb 2025; Saalbach WC	23 Feb 2025; Crans Montana	9 Mar 2025; Kvitfjell	23 Mar 2025; Sun Valley	
#	Skier	(United States)	(Italy)	(Italy)	(Switzerland)	(Austria)	(Austria)	(Switzerland)	(Norway)	(United States)	Total
	(Switzerland) Marco Odermatt	100	60	45	36	100	①	100	50	45	536
2	(Switzerland) Stefan Rogentin	5	45	50	60	60	⑨	15	36	50	321
3	(Austria) Vincent Kriechmayr	40	22	80	80	DNS	④	14	45	36	317
4	(Switzerland) Franjo von Allmen	0	8	40	100	50	⑫	36	20	60	314
5	(Norway) Fredrik Møller	50	50	100	20	DNS	⑤	DNF	14	36	270
6	(Italy) Dominik Paris	16	26	15	45	DNF	⑦	60	100	DNF	262
7	(Italy) Mattia Casse	15	100	24	40	36	㉓	45	DNS		260
8	(Switzerland) Alexis Monney	14	10	60	29	7	DNF	80	40	DNF	240
9	(Austria) Lukas Feurstein	60	3	DNS	29	DNF	⑪	29	18	100	236
10	(Austria) Raphael Haaser	DNF	DNS			80	②	50	15	80	225
11	(Canada) James Crawford	DNF	20	DNF	50	32	㉗	DNF	80	16	198
12	(France) Nils Allègre	DNF	36	32	11	18	⑰	26	29	24	176
13	(Italy) Giovanni Franzoni	50	1	14	14	26	DNF	0	16	26	147
14	(Canada) Cameron Alexander	DNF	45	22	32	45	DNS				144
	(Norway) Adrian Smiseth Sejersted	DNF	0	20	22	40	③	40	DNF	22	144
16	(Austria) Stefan Eichberger	18	4	DNF	8	20	DNS	22	29	40	141
17	(Switzerland) Justin Murisier	14	16	16	18	29	DNS	9	8	18	128
18	(United States) Ryan Cochran-Siegle	24	11	9	24	0	⑦	8	24	20	120
	(Slovenia) Miha Hrobat	DNF	15	DNF	0	13	DNF	32	60	DNF	120
20	(United States) Jared Goldberg	0	80	2	0	9	㉕	0	22	0	113
21	(Austria) Stefan Babinsky	DNF	18	26	16	11	⑥	5	6	29	111
22	(Czech Republic) Jan Zabystřan	22	0	11	14	DNF	⑯	18	32	DNF	97
23	(Austria) Daniel Hemetsberger	6	0	36	15	14	DNS	16	DNS	0	87
24	(France) Cyprien Sarrazin	80	DNF	DNS							80
25	(Italy) Christof Innerhofer	0	0	DNS	12	22	㉔	22	3	0	59
26	(France) Blaise Giezendanner	7	29	14	0	DNS				NE	50
	(United States) River Radamus	32	0	DNF	2	0	⑲	3	13	NE	50
28	(France) Florian Loriot	20	0	29	0	DNF	⑬	0	0	NE	49
	(Germany) Romed Baumann	10	0	7	0	10	㉒	10	12	NE	49
30	(Sweden) Felix Monsén	0	0	DNF	6	26	⑳	13	0	NE	45
31	(United States) Kyle Negomir	12	DNF	10	0	0	DNS	11	10	NE	43
32	(Canada) Jeffrey Read	DNF	DNF	12	9	8	⑩	2	11	NE	42
33	(Switzerland) Gino Caviezel	36	0	DNF	DNS					NE	36
34	(Switzerland) Lars Rösti	DNS	32	DNF	0	DNF	DNS	DNF	0	NE	32
	(Switzerland) Loïc Meillard	5	DNS		8	15	DNS	4	0	0	32
36	(France) Adrien Théaux	DNS	10	5	0	0	DNS	8	7	NE	30
37	(Austria) Daniel Danklmaier	29	DNF	DNS						NE	29
38	(Austria) Andreas Ploier	DNS		0	DNF	DNS		24	4	NE	28
39	(Finland) Elian Lehto	DNS	6	4	DNF	0	㉖	12	5	NE	27
40	(France) Alexis Pinturault	26	0	DNS		DNF	DNS			NE	26
	(United States) Bryce Bennett	3	0	0	1	12	⑮	0	10	NE	26
42	(Austria) Otmar Striedinger	8	7	DNF	10	DNF	DNS	0	0	NE	25
43	(Italy) Pietro Zazzi	0	24	DNS						NE	24
44	(France) Matthieu Bailet	11	12	DNF	0	DNF	DNF	0	0	NE	23
45	(Canada) Brodie Seger	10	5	DNS	DNF	4	㉘	0	2	NE	21
46	(Italy) Nicolo Molteni	DNF	15	3	0	1	DNS	0	0	NE	19
47	(Austria) Felix Hacker	DNS		18	DNS					NE	18
	(Germany) Luis Vogt	0	15	DNF	0	3	DNF	DNF	0	NE	18
49	(Canada) Riley Seger	DNF	0	DNS	0	16	⑳	0	0	NE	16
50	(Italy) Florian Schieder	DNF	0	DNS	DNF	5	DNS	8	DNF	NE	13
51	(Switzerland) Marco Kohler	3	0	6	DNS			0	0	NE	9
52	(Austria) Vincent Wieser	DNS	0	8	DNS	DNF	DNS		0	NE	8
53	(France) Nils Alphand	1	0	0	5	DNF	DNF	DNS		NE	6
	(Austria) Manuel Traninger	DNF	0	DNS	0	6	DNS	0	0	NE	6
	(United States) Sam Morse	0	0	DNF	4	DNF	DNS	0	2	NE	6
56	(Switzerland) Arnaud Boisset	DNS			3	1	DNS			NE	4
57	(Slovenia) Martin Čater	DNF	2	0	0	DNF	DNF	DNS		NE	2
	(United States) Wiley Maple	DNF	0	DNF	0	2	DNS	DNF	0	NE	2
59	(Norway) Rasmus Windingstad	0	0	1	DNS	0	㉜	DNF	DNF	NE	1
	(Italy) Matteo Franzoso	DNS				0	㉜	1	0	NE	1
	References										

=== Legend ===
- Winner (100 points)
- 2nd place (80 points)
- 3rd place (60 points)
- DNF = Did not finish
- DSQ = Disqualified
- Did not start (DNS)
- Not eligible for finals (NE)
- Race canceled (x)
- FIS non-World Cup race (World Championships)
- Updated at 23 March 2025, after all events.

== See also ==
- 2025 Alpine Skiing World Cup – Men's summary rankings
- 2025 Alpine Skiing World Cup – Men's overall
- 2025 Alpine Skiing World Cup – Men's downhill
- 2025 Alpine Skiing World Cup – Men's giant slalom
- 2025 Alpine Skiing World Cup – Men's slalom
- World Cup scoring system
