= 2027 Alpine Skiing World Cup – Men's overall =

Alpine ski discipline year standings

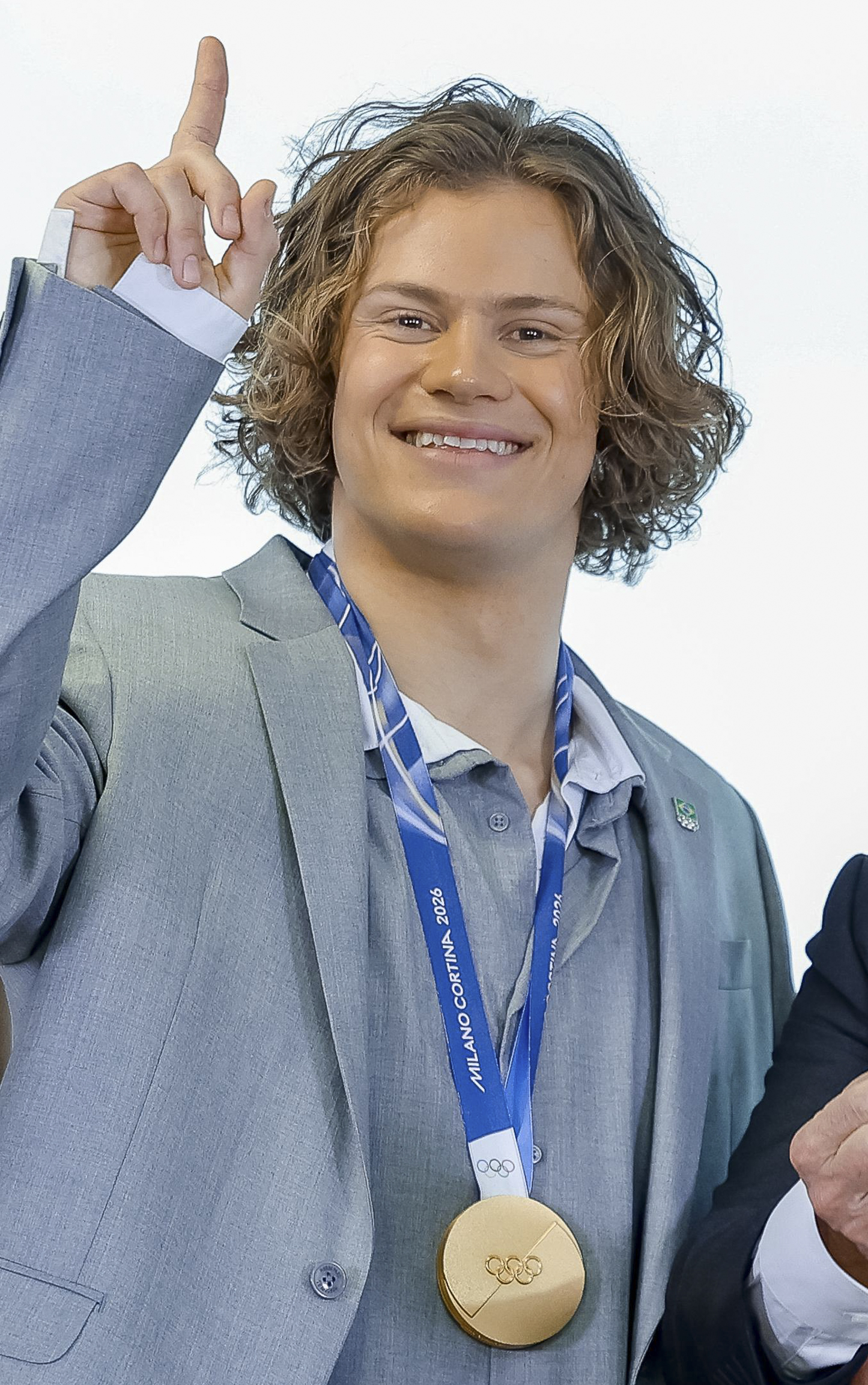
2027 Men's Overall World Cup: Lucas Pinheiro Braathen of Brazil, current leader; 2027 Men's World Cup; Overall • Downhill • Super-G; Giant slalom • Slalom
Previous: 2026	Next: 2028

The men's overall in the 2027 FIS Alpine Skiing World Cup is scheduled to consist of 43 events in four disciplines: downhill (DH) (10 races), super-G (SG) (10 races), giant slalom (GS) (10 races), and slalom (SL) (13 races). A tentative schedule was circulated on 7 May 2026 following the FIS Alpine Spring Meeting in Portorož, Slovenia. The schedule was released on 15 June 2026 and features events at 21 different resorts, beginning with the traditional opener: a giant slalom on the Rettenbach ski course, located on the Rettenbach glacier in Sölden, Austria, on 25 October 2026. The World Cup Finals in all events for the season will be held in Sun Valley, Idaho (U.S.) from 20 to 25 March 2027.

The schedule is subject to amendment or revision throughout the season, although the only amendments likely to be made to it would be caused by adverse weather.

In 2026, Swiss three-event star Marco Odermatt easily won his fifth consecutive overall World Cup title, along with the downhill and super-G disciplines, giving him crystal globes in both disciplines for the third straight year, and he heads into the 2027 season as a huge favorite to repeat as overall champion once again.

As is the case every odd-numbered year, the FIS Alpine World Ski Championships will take place, this time in Crans Montana, Switzerland during 1–14 February 2027.

== Season summary ==
=== Opening months (October 2026 to Christmas) ===
In the first race at Sölden, Norwegian-turned-Brazilian star Lucas Pinheiro Braathen (who openly proclaimed his ambition to win the overall season championship before the race, including by participating in super-G in addition to giant slalom and slalom (in each of which he has previously won the season championship)) opened his giant slalom title defense on a strong note, leading after each run and defeating each of the Swiss duo of Loïc Meillard and Odermatt by about half a second. Braathen then repeated his slalom win at Levi for a second straight victory this season, opening over a half-second lead over France's Clément Noël on the first run and then maintaining the margin on the second. The next week in Gurgl (AUT), Braathen fell on the first run, setting up a race between Norwegians Timon Haugan and Atle Lie McGrath, and when McGrath failed to finish the second run, Haugan won his eigth World Cup race and took over the discipline lead.

== Finals ==
The finals in all disciplines will be held from 20 to 25 March 2027 in Sun Valley, Idaho, U.S. Only the top 25 skiers in each World Cup discipline and the winner of the 2027 FIS Junior World Championships in the discipline, plus any skiers who have scored at least 500 points in the World Cup overall classification for the season, will be eligible to compete in the final, and only the top 15 finishers will earn World Cup points.

== Standings ==
#	Skier	DH; 0 races	SG; 0 races	GS; 1 race	SL; 2 races	Total
1	(Brazil) Lucas Pinheiro Braathen	0	0	100	100	200
2	(Switzerland) Loïc Meillard	0	0	80	71	151
3	(Norway) Timon Haugan	0	0	0	113	113
4	(Norway) Eirik Hystad Solberg	0	0	32	80	112
5	(France) Clément Noël	0	0	0	104	104
6	(Sweden) Fabian Ax Swartz	0	0	0	90	90
7	(Switzerland) Tanguy Nef	0	0	0	82	82
8	(Italy) Alex Vinatzer	0	0	36	45	81
9	(Croatia) Samuel Kolega	0	0	0	69	69
10	(France) Paco Rassat	0	0	0	62	62
11	(Switzerland) Marco Odermatt	0	0	60	0	60
12	(United States) River Radamus	0	0	50	0	50
	(Belgium) Armand Marchant	0	0	0	50	50
14	(Finland) Eduard Hallberg	0	0	15	32	47
15	(Austria) Raphael Haaser	0	0	45	0	45
	(Austria) Michael Matt	0	0	0	45	45
17	(Germany) Fabian Gratz	0	0	40	0	40
18	(Norway) Atle Lie McGrath	0	0	0	36	36
19	(Austria) Joshua Sturm	0	0	14	22	36
20	(Germany) Linus Straßer	0	0	0	33	33
21	(United Kingdom) Laurie Taylor	0	0	0	32	32
22	(Switzerland) Daniel Yule	0	0	0	30	30
23	(France) Léo Anguenot	0	0	29	0	29
	(United States) Jett Seymour	0	0	0	29	29
25	(France) Auguste Aulnette	0	0	0	27	27
26	(France) Steven Amiez	0	0	0	26	26
	(Austria) Patrick Feurstein	0	0	26	0	26
	(Bulgaria) Albert Popov	0	0	0	26	26
29	(Austria) Stefan Brennsteiner	0	0	24	0	24
	(Norway) Oscar Andreas Sandvik	0	0	0	24	24
31	(Norway) Hans Grahl-Madsen	0	0	5	18	23
32	(United Kingdom) Freddy Carrick-Smith	0	0	22	0	22
33	(Norway) Henrik Kristoffersen	0	0	9	12	21
	(Belgium) Sam Maes	0	0	11	10	21
35	(France) Thibaut Favrot	0	0	20	0	20
36	(Norway) Rasmus Bakkevig	0	0	18	0	18
	(Japan) Shiro Aihara	0	0	0	18	18
38	(Germany) Anton Grammel	0	0	16	0	16
	(United Kingdom) Billy Major	0	0	0	16	16
40	(Sweden) Gustav Wissting	0	0	0	14	14
	(France) Antoine Azzolin	0	0	0	14	14
42	(Slovenia) Žan Kranjec	0	0	13	0	13
43	(Croatia) Filip Zubčić	0	0	12	0	12
	(Austria) Fabio Gstrein	0	0	0	12	12
45	(Germany) Alexander Schmid	0	0	10	0	10
	(Canada) Liam Wallace	0	0	0	10	10
47	(Austria) Johannes Strolz	0	0	0	9	9
	(United States) Benjamin Ritchie	0	0	0	9	9
49	(Switzerland) Thomas Tumler	0	0	8	0	8
	(Austria) Dominik Raschner	0	0	0	8	8
51	(France) Alban Elezi Cannaferina	0	0	7	0	7
	(Italy) Tobias Kastlunger	0	0	0	7	7
53	(Switzerland) Lenz Hächler	0	0	6	0	6
	(Austria) Adrian Pertl	0	0	0	6	6
55	(Switzerland) Franjo von Allmen	0	0	0	0	0
	(Austria) Vincent Kriechmayr	0	0	0	0	0
	(Italy) Dominik Paris	0	0	0	0	0
	(Italy) Giovanni Franzoni	0	0	0	0	0
	(Austria) Marco Schwarz	0	0	0	0	0
	(Switzerland) Alexis Monney	0	0	0	0	0
	(Switzerland) Stefan Rogentin	0	0	0	0	0
	(France) Nils Allègre	0	0	0	0	0
	(United States) Ryan Cochran-Siegle	0	0	0	0	0
	(Italy) Mattia Casse	0	0	0	0	0
	(Austria) Stefan Babinsky	0	0	0	0	0
	(Italy) Florian Schieder	0	0	0	0	0
	(Austria) Daniel Hemetsberger	0	0	0	0	0
	(Norway) Adrian Smiseth Sejersted	0	0	0	0	0
	(Austria) Manuel Feller	0	0	0	0	0
	(Canada) Cameron Alexander	0	0	0	0	0
	(Slovenia) Miha Hrobat	0	0	0	0	0
	(Switzerland) Luca Aerni	0	0	0	0	0
	(Italy) Christof Innerhofer	0	0	0	0	0
	(Norway) Fredrik Møller	0	0	0	0	0
	(Czech Republic) Jan Zabystřan	0	0	0	0	0
	(Italy) Benjamin Alliod	0	0	0	0	0
	(France) Maxence Muzaton	0	0	0	0	0
	(Switzerland) Justin Murisier	0	0	0	0	0
	(Italy) Tommaso Sala	0	0	0	0	0
	(Austria) Lukas Feurstein	0	0	0	0	0
	(Switzerland) Alessio Miggiano	0	0	0	0	0
	(Germany) Simon Jocher	0	0	0	0	0
	(France) Nils Alphand	0	0	0	0	0
	(Italy) Guglielmo Bosca	0	0	0	0	0
	(Canada) James Crawford	0	0	0	0	0
	(United States) Kyle Negomir	0	0	0	0	0
	(Finland) Elian Lehto	0	0	0	0	0
	(Switzerland) Marco Kohler	0	0	0	0	0
	(France) Matthieu Bailet	0	0	0	0	0
	(Germany) Jonas Stockinger	0	0	0	0	0
	(Austria) Stefan Eichberger	0	0	0	0	0
	(Switzerland) Matthias Iten	0	0	0	0	0
	(Slovenia) Martin Čater	0	0	0	0	0
	(Andorra) Joan Verdú	0	0	0	0	0
	(Switzerland) Lars Rösti	0	0	0	0	0
	(Germany) Luis Vogt	0	0	0	0	0
	(France) Blaise Giezendanner	0	0	0	0	0
	(Sweden) Felix Monsén	0	0	0	0	0
	(Canada) Brodie Seger	0	0	0	0	0
	(Italy) Giovanni Borsotti	0	0	0	0	0
	(Austria) Andreas Ploier	0	0	0	0	0
	(United States) Erik Arvidsson	0	0	0	0	0
	(France) Flavio Vitale	0	0	0	0	0
	(Switzerland) Ramon Zenhäusern	0	0	0	0	0
	(France) Sam Alphand	0	0	0	0	0
	(United States) Ryder Sarchett	0	0	0	0	0
	(United States) Sam Morse	0	0	0	0	0
	(United States) Bryce Bennett	0	0	0	0	0
	(Italy) Filippo Della Vite	0	0	0	0	0
	(France) Loévan Parand	0	0	0	0	0
	(Norway) Aleksander Aamodt Kilde	0	0	0	0	0
	(Italy) Luca De Aliprandini	0	0	0	0	0
	(Austria) Vincent Wieser	0	0	0	0	0
	(United States) Wiley Maple	0	0	0	0	0
	(Canada) Jeffrey Read	0	0	0	0	0
	(Switzerland) Livio Hiltbrand	0	0	0	0	0
	(Austria) Stefan Rieser	0	0	0	0	0
	(France) Hugo Desgrippes	0	0	0	0	0
	(Switzerland) Simon Rueland	0	0	0	0	0
	(Chile) Henrik von Appen	0	0	0	0	0
	(Switzerland) Arnaud Boisset	0	0	0	0	0
	(Sweden) Kristoffer Jakobsen	0	0	0	0	0
	(Spain) Joaquim Salarich	0	0	0	0	0
	(France) Charles Gamel Seigneur	0	0	0	0	0
	(Canada) Erik Read	0	0	0	0	0
	(Spain) Albert Ortega Fornesa	0	0	0	0	0
	(Croatia) Istok Rodeš	0	0	0	0	0
	(United States) Luke Winters	0	0	0	0	0
	(Japan) Yohei Koyama	0	0	0	0	0
	(Finland) Jesper Pohjolainen	0	0	0	0	0
	(Canada) Raphaël Lessard	0	0	0	0	0
	(Estonia) Tormis Laine	0	0	0	0	0
	(Norway) Theodor Brækken	0	0	0	0	0
	(Italy) Matteo Canins	0	0	0	0	0
	(Slovakia) Andreas Žampa	0	0	0	0	0
	(Italy) Nicolo Molteni	0	0	0	0	0
	(Sweden) William Hansson	0	0	0	0	0
	(Austria) Manuel Tranninger	0	0	0	0	0
	(Spain) Aleix Aubert Serracanta	0	0	0	0	0
	(Switzerland) Fadri Janutin	0	0	0	0	0
	(Switzerland) Marc Rochat	0	0	0	0	0
	(United States) Jared Goldberg	0	0	0	0	0
	(France) Guerlain Favre	0	0	0	0	0
	(United States) Cooper Puckett	0	0	0	0	0
	(Italy) Max Perathoner	0	0	0	0	0
	(Slovenia) Nejc Naraločnik	0	0	0	0	0
	(Spain) Juan del Campo	0	0	0	0	0
	(United States) Bridger Gile	0	0	0	0	0
	(Italy) Tommaso Saccardi	0	0	0	0	0
	(United States) George Steffey	0	0	0	0	0
	(Italy) Simon Talacci	0	0	0	0	0
	(Italy) Corrado Barbera	0	0	0	0	0

- Leader
- 2nd place
- 3rd place
- does not compete in this discipline
- Updated on 22 November 2026, after 3 of 43 events.

== See also ==
- 2027 Alpine Skiing World Cup – Men's summary rankings
- 2027 Alpine Skiing World Cup – Men's downhill
- 2027 Alpine Skiing World Cup – Men's super-G
- 2027 Alpine Skiing World Cup – Men's giant slalom
- 2027 Alpine Skiing World Cup – Men's slalom
- 2027 Alpine Skiing World Cup – Women's overall
- World Cup scoring system
