= Fabian Gratz =

German alpine skier (born 1997)

Personal information
- Born: 22 July 1997 (age 29) Starnberg, Bavaria, Germany
- Height: 180 cm (5 ft 11 in)

Skiing career
- Country: Germany
- Sport: Alpine skiing
- Club: TSV Altenau
- Disciplines: Giant slalom
- World Cup debut: 2 February 2020 (age 22)

Olympics
- Teams: 1 – (2026)
- Medals: 0

World Championships
- Teams: 2 – (2023, 2025)
- Medals: 0

World Cup
- Seasons: 7 – (2020–2026)
- Podiums: 0
- Overall titles: 0 – (37th in 2026)
- Discipline titles: 0 – (11th in GS, 2026)

Fabian Gratz (born 22 July 1997) is a German World Cup alpine ski racer, specializing in giant slalom. He represented Germany at the 2026 Winter Olympics and has also represented Germany at multiple World Championships.

== Early life ==
Born in Starnberg, Bavaria, Gratz played several sports as a child, including football and athletics, but found skiing to be his greatest passion.

== Career ==
Gratz began competing in international races in 2013 at the age of sixteen and debuted on the Europa Cup in 2017. His first major international competition was the 2018 Junior World Championships in Davos, Switzerland.

He earned his first points on the Europa Cup in January 2020. As of the 2025-26 season, he has been on the podium a total of five times in the Europa Cup; one of those is a victory, which he scored in a giant slalom race in Val Cenis on January 17, 2024. Gratz made his World Cup debut in the giant slalom on home soil at Garmisch-Partenkirchen on 2 February 2020. He ended up in 31th position, being 0,01 s from a qualification to the second run.

The 2021-22 season was Gratz's first primarily racing in World Cup events, with 8 starts. During this season, Gratz also scored his first points at this circuit; he ended up scoring 28th place twice in Kranjska Goras' two giant slalom races. At the end of the season, he participated in the 2023 World Championships. He continued to ski alternately on the Europa and World Cup tours during the next few seasons; Gratz collected World Cup points occasionally during the next three World Cup seasons.

He also made his second World Championships appearance at the 2025 World Alpine Ski Championships in Saalbach-Hinterglemm, Austria.

During the 2025-26 World Cup season, Gratz achieved his first World Cup top five in Alta Badia, Italy, in December. Being 29th after run 1, he had the best time in the second run and that result plus two top-fifteen finishes earlier that season (at Copper Mountain and Val d'Isère) qualified him for the upcoming Winter Olympics. He posted his second top ten the next month in Adelboden, Switzerland, then posted the third-fastest first run in the final pre-Olympic giant slalom in Schladming, before dropping to eleventh after the second run.

At the 2026 Milano Cortina Olympics, Gratz competed in the giant slalom and slalom, but was unable to complete both runs in either event, despite having the tenth-best first run in the giant slalom.

== Personal life ==
In his spare time, Gratz enjoys bicycling, photographing and surfing.

== World Cup results ==
=== Season standings ===
Season
Season	Age	Overall	Slalom	Giant slalom	Super-G	Downhill
2022	24	145	—	53	—	—
2023	25	145	—	51	—	—
2024	26	123	—	46	—	—
2025	27	100	—	30	—	—
2026	28	37	—	11	—	—
2027	29	6	—	6	—	—

Standings through 26 October 2026

=== Top-ten results ===
- 0 podiums, 4 top tens

Season
Season	Date	Location	Discipline	Place
2026	21 December 2025	Alta Badia, Italy	Giant slalom	5th
2026	10 January 2026	Adelboden, Switzerland	Giant slalom	9th
2026	24 March 2026	Hafjell, Norway	Giant slalom	10th
2027	25 October 2026	Sölden, Austria	Giant slalom	6th

== World Championship results ==
Year
Year	Age	Slalom	Giant slalom	Super-G	Downhill	Combined	Team combined	Team event
2023	25	—	DNF2	—	—	—	—N/a	—
2025	27	—	18	—	—	—N/a	—	5

== Olympic results ==
Year
Year	Age	Slalom	Giant slalom	Super-G	Downhill	Team combined
2026	28	DNF1	DNF2	—	—	—
