= Samuel Kolega =

Croatian alpine skier (born 1999)

Personal information
- Born: 15 January 1999 (age 27) Ulm, Germany
- Height: 1.86 m (6 ft 1 in)
- Family: Elias Kolega (brother)

Skiing career
- Country: Croatia
- Sport: Alpine skiing
- Disciplines: Slalom
- World Cup debut: 5 March 2016 (age 17)

Olympics
- Teams: 2 – (2018, 2022)
- Medals: 0

World Championships
- Teams: 5 – (2017–2025)
- Medals: 0

World Cup
- Seasons: 12 – (2016–2027)
- Wins: 0
- Podiums: 1 – (1 SL)
- Overall titles: 0 – (41st in 2025)
- Discipline titles: 0 – (13th in SL, 2025)

Samuel Kolega (Croatian pronunciation: [sǎmuel kolěːɡa]; born 15 January 1999) is a Croatian World Cup alpine ski racer who specializes in slalom.

Kolega secured his first World Cup points in January 2021, finishing 15th in his home race at Sljeme. His older brother, Elias Kolega, is a retired alpine skier.

== World Cup results ==
=== Season standings ===
Season
Season	Age	Overall	Slalom	Giant slalom	Super-G	Downhill
2021	22	123	41	—	—	—
2022	23	94	34	—	—	—
2023	24	70	25	—	—	—
2024	25	55	20	—	—	—
2025	26	41	13	—	—	—
2026	27	70	25	—	—	—
2027	28	9	8	—	—	—

Standings through 22 November 2026

=== Race podiums ===
- 0 wins
- 1 podium – (1 SL); 9 top tens

Season
Season	Date	Location	Discipline	Place
2025	8 January 2025	Madonna di Campiglio, Italy	Slalom	3rd

== World Championship results ==
Year
Year	Age	Slalom	Giant slalom	Super-G	Downhill	Combined	Team combined	Parallel	Team event
2017	18	—	DNF2QR	—	—	—	—N/a	—N/a	—
2019	20	—	38	—	—	—	—N/a	—N/a	—
2021	22	DNF1	DNF2	—	—	—	—N/a	—	—
2023	24	34	—	—	—	—	—N/a	—	—
2025	26	10	—	—	—	—N/a	—	—N/a	—

== Olympic results ==
Year
Year	Age	Slalom	Giant slalom	Super-G	Downhill	Combined	Team combined
2018	19	—	37	—	—	—	—N/a
2022	23	15	21	—	—	—	—N/a
2026	27	DNF1	—	—	—	—N/a	—
