= River Radamus =

American alpine skier (born 1998)

Personal information
- Born: February 12, 1998 (age 28) Edwards, Colorado, U.S.
- Height: 6 ft 0 in (183 cm)

Skiing career
- Country: United States
- Sport: Alpine skiing
- Club: Ski & Snowboard Club Vail
- Disciplines: Giant slalom, super-G, slalom
- World Cup debut: December 3, 2017 (age 19)

Olympics
- Teams: 2 – (2022, 2026)
- Medals: 0

World Championships
- Teams: 3 – (2021–2025)
- Medals: 1 (1 gold)

World Cup
- Seasons: 10 – (2018–2027)
- Wins: 0
- Podiums: 1 – (1 GS)
- Overall titles: 0 – (28th in 2026)
- Discipline titles: 0 – (10th in GS, 2026)
Medal record
Men's alpine skiing
Representing the United States
World Championships
Gold medal – first place	2023 Méribel	Team event
Youth Olympic Games
Gold medal – first place	2016 Lillehammer	Super-G
Gold medal – first place	2016 Lillehammer	Giant slalom
Gold medal – first place	2016 Lillehammer	Combined
World Junior Championships
Gold medal – first place	2019 Val di Fassa	Super-G
Gold medal – first place	2019 Val di Fassa	Giant slalom
Silver medal – second place	2017 Åre	Combined
Silver medal – second place	2018 Davos	Super-G
Silver medal – second place	2019 Val di Fassa	Team event

River Radamus (born February 12, 1998) is an American World Cup alpine ski racer from Colorado. He is a three-time Youth Olympic Games gold medalist and a two-time Junior World Champion. At the World Cup level, Radamus focuses on giant slalom, and also competes in super-G and slalom. He is the son of Aldo Radamus, former U.S. Ski Team coach and Team Summit Colorado Alpine Program Director.

Radamus represented the United States at the 2022 Winter Olympics, and just missed a medal, finishing fourth in the giant slalom. He made a second Olympic appearance at the 2026 Winter Olympics, where his best finish was seventeenth in the giant slalom and in the men's team combined he finished 19th with teammate Kyle Negomir.

== World Cup results ==
=== Season standings ===
Season
Season	Age	Overall	Slalom	Giant slalom	Super-G	Downhill	Combined	Parallel
2019	21	142	—	49	—	—	—	—N/a
2020	22	129	—	—	—	—	—	25
2021	23	43	—	28	—	—	—N/a	—
2022	24	57	—	15	—	—	—N/a	—
2023	25	63	—	20	45	—	—N/a	—N/a
2024	26	32	46	11	27	—	—N/a	—N/a
2025	27	36	53	11	26	—	—N/a	—N/a
2026	28	28	—	10	25	—	—N/a	—N/a
2027	29	4	—	4	—	—	—N/a	—N/a

Standings through October 26, 2026

=== Top-ten results ===
- 0 wins
- 1 podium (1 GS), 17 top tens (15 GS, 2 SG)

Season
Season	Date	Location	Discipline	Place
2022	October 24, 2021	Sölden, Austria	Giant slalom	6th
2022	December 19, 2021	Alta Badia, Italy	Giant slalom	6th
2022	December 20, 2021	Alta Badia, Italy	Giant slalom	10th
2023	December 19, 2022	Alta Badia, Italy	Giant slalom	10th
2024	December 9, 2023	Val d'Isère, France	Giant slalom	10th
2024	January 6, 2024	Adelboden, Switzerland	Giant slalom	4th
2024	January 28, 2024	Garmisch-Partenkirchen, Germany	Super-G	8th
2024	February 24, 2024	Palisades Tahoe, United States	Giant slalom	3rd
2025	December 7, 2024	Beaver Creek, United States	Super-G	8th
2025	December 8, 2024	Beaver Creek, United States	Giant slalom	7th
2025	January 12, 2025	Adelboden, Switzerland	Giant slalom	10th
2025	March 15, 2025	Hafjell, Norway	Giant slalom	7th
2026	December 7, 2025	Beaver Creek, United States	Giant slalom	6th
2026	December 13, 2025	Val d'Isère, France	Giant slalom	6th
2026	December 21, 2025	Alta Badia, Italy	Giant slalom	7th
2026	January 10, 2026	Adelboden, Switzerland	Giant slalom	7th
2027	October 25, 2026	Sölden, Austria	Giant slalom	4th

== World Championship results ==
Year
Year	Age	Slalom	Giant slalom	Super-G	Downhill	Combined	Team combined	Parallel	Team event
2021	23	DNF2	11	—	—	—	—N/a	8	6
2023	25	—	12	16	—	4	—N/a	15	1
2025	27	DNF1	17	19	—	—N/a	—	—N/a	4

== Olympic results ==
Year
Year	Age	Slalom	Giant slalom	Super-G	Downhill	Combined	Team combined	Team event
2022	24	—	4	15	—	—	—N/a	4
2026	28	DNF1	17	DNF	—	—N/a	19	—N/a
