= 2027 Alpine Skiing World Cup – Men's giant slalom =

Alpine ski discipline year standings

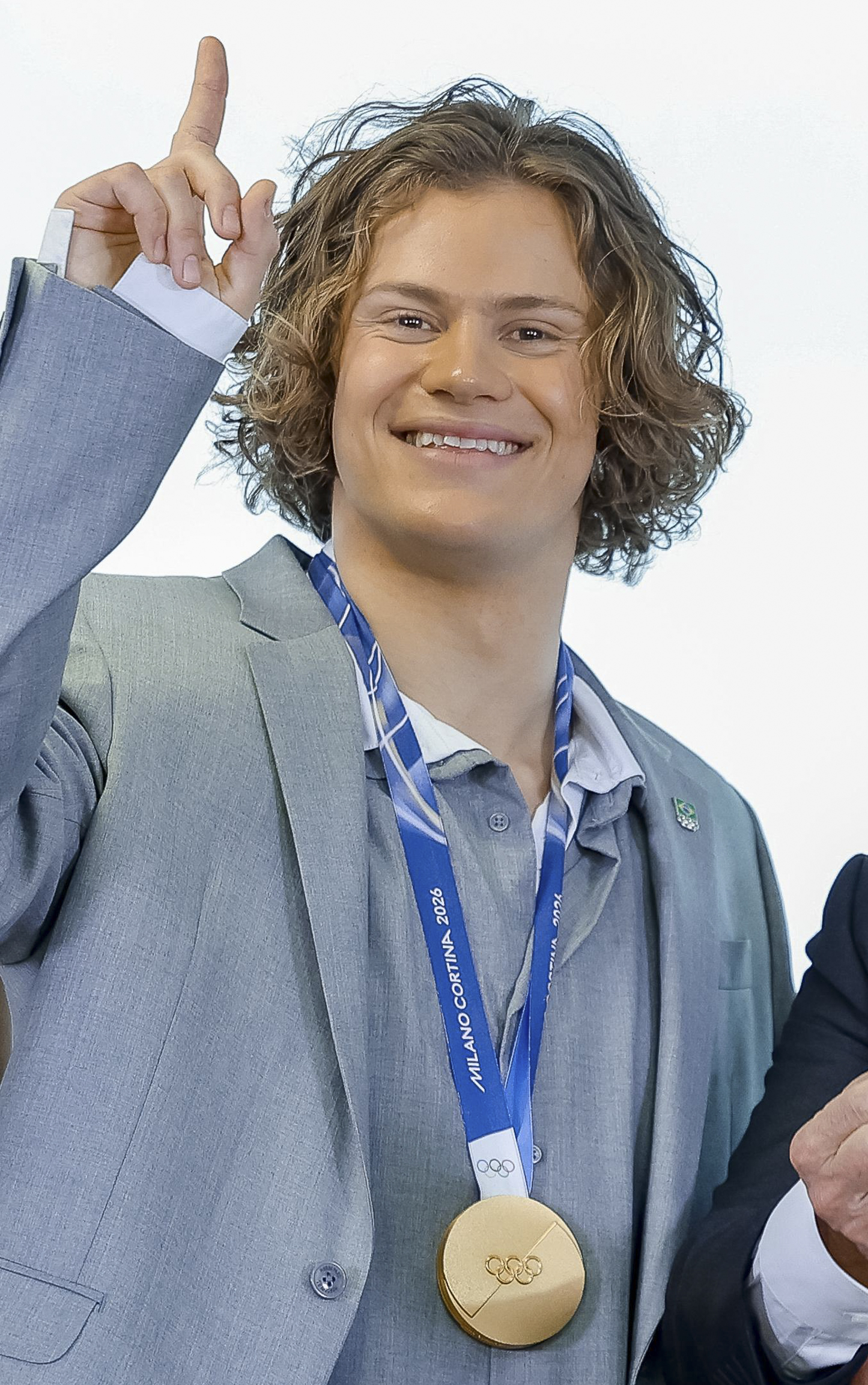
2027 Men's Giant slalom World Cup: Lucas Pinheiro Braathen of Brazil, current leader; 2026 Men's World Cup; Overall • Downhill • Super-G; Giant slalom • Slalom
Previous: 2026	Next: 2028

The men's giant slalom in the 2027 FIS Alpine Skiing World Cup is scheduled to consist of ten events, including the final. The season is scheduled to begin with the traditional opener: a giant slalom on the Rettenbach ski course, located on the Rettenbach glacier in Sölden, Austria, on 25 October 2026. As in the 2026 season, the next two giant slaloms will take place in the United States in late November and early December, after which the remainder of the regular-season races were held in Europe. The World Cup Finals in all events for the season will be held in Sun Valley, Idaho (U.S.) from 20 to 25 March 2027.

The season championship in 2026 was won by Brazil's Lucas Pinheiro Braathen, who ended Marco Odermatt's four-year hold on the discipline by winning the finals race; the same two are forecast as the leading competitors for the current season.

As is the case every odd-numbered year, the FIS Alpine World Ski Championships will take place, this time in Crans Montana, Switzerland during 1–14 February 2027.

== Season summary ==
In the first race at Sölden, Braathen (who openly proclaimed his ambition to win the overall season championship before the race) opened his title defense on a strong note, leading after each run and defeating each of the Swiss duo of Loïc Meillard and Odermatt by about half a second.

== Finals ==
The finals in all disciplines will be held from 20 to 25 March 2027 in Sun Valley, Idaho, U.S. Only the top 25 skiers in each World Cup discipline and the winner of the 2027 FIS Junior World Championships in the discipline, plus any skiers who have scored at least 500 points in the World Cup overall classification for the season, will be eligible to compete in the final, and only the top 15 finishers will earn World Cup points. The final race in men's giant slalom is scheduled for Wednesday, 24 March 2026.

== Standings ==
	Venue	25 Oct 2026; Sölden	29 Nov 2026; Copper Mountain	6 Dec 2026; Beaver Creek	12 Dec 2026; Val d'Isère	20 Dec 2026; Alta Badia	2 Jan 2027; Kranjska Gora	9 Jan 2027; Adelboden	26 Jan 2027; Schladming	12 Feb 2027; Crans Montana WC	13 Mar 2027; Åre	24 Mar 2027; Sun Valley	
#	Skier	(Austria)	(United States)	(United States)	(France)	(Italy)	(Slovenia)	(Switzerland)	(Austria)	(Switzerland)	(Sweden)	(United States)	Total
1	(Brazil) Lucas Pinheiro Braathen	100											100
2	(Switzerland) Loïc Meillard	80											80
3	(Switzerland) Marco Odermatt	60											60
4	(United States) River Radamus	50											50
5	(Austria) Raphael Haaser	45											45
6	(Germany) Fabian Gratz	40											40
7	(Italy) Alex Vinatzer	36											36
8	(Norway) Eirik Hystad Solberg	32											32
9	(France) Léo Anguenot	29											29
10	(Austria) Patrick Feurstein	26											26
11	(Austria) Stefan Brennsteiner	24											24
12	(United Kingdom) Freddy Carrick-Smith	22											22
13	(France) Thibaut Favrot	20											20
14	(Norway) Rasmus Bakkevig	18											18
15	(Germany) Anton Grammel	16											16
16	(Finland) Eduard Hallberg	15											15
17	(Austria) Joshua Sturm	14											14
18	(Slovenia) Žan Kranjec	13											13
19	(Croatia) Filip Zubčić	12											12
20	(Belgium) Sam Maes	11											11
21	(Germany) Alexander Schmid	10											10
22	(Norway) Henrik Kristoffersen	9											9
23	(Switzerland) Thomas Tumler	8											8
24	(France) Alban Elezi Cannaferina	7											7
25	(Switzerland) Lenz Hächler	6											6
26	(Norway) Hans Grahl-Madsen	5											5
27	(Austria) Marco Schwarz	DNF1											0
	(Norway) Atle Lie McGrath	DNF2											0
	(Norway) Timon Haugan	DNQ											0
	(Switzerland) Luca Aerni	DNQ											0
	(Germany) Jonas Stockinger	DNQ											0
	(Andorra) Joan Verdú	DNQ											0
	(Italy) Giovanni Borsotti	DNF2											0
	(France) Flavio Vitale	DNQ											0
	(Austria) Lukas Feurstein	DNQ											0
	(United States) Ryder Sarchett	DNQ											0
	(Italy) Filippo Della Vite	DNQ											0
	(France) Loévan Parand	DNQ											0
	(Sweden) Fabian Ax Swartz	DNQ											0
	(Italy) Luca De Aliprandini	DNQ											0
	(Norway) Oscar Andreas Sandvik	DNF2											0
	(Canada) Erik Read	DNQ											0
	(Spain) Albert Ortega Fornesa	DNS											0
	(Estonia) Tormis Laine	DNQ											0
	(Slovakia) Andreas Žampa	DNQ											0
	(Sweden) William Hansson	DNQ											0
	(Spain) Aleix Aubert Serracanta	DNQ											0
	(Switzerland) Fadri Janutin	DNQ											0
	(Italy) Tobias Kastlunger	DNQ											0
	(France) Guerlain Favre	DNQ											0
	(United States) Bridger Gile	DNQ											0
	(United States) George Steffey	DNS											0
	(Italy) Simon Talacci	DNF1											0
	(Austria) Lukas Feurstein	DNQ											0
	References												

=== Legend ===
- Winner (100 points)
- 2nd place (80 points)
- 3rd place (60 points)
- DNQ = Did not qualify for run 2
- DNF1 = Did not finish run 1
- DSQ1 = Disqualified run 1
- DNF2 = Did not finish run 2
- DSQ2 = Disqualified run 2
- DNS2 = Did not start run 2
- Did not start (DNS)
- Not eligible for finals (NE)
- Race canceled (x)
- FIS non-World Cup race (Olympics)
- R# = Rescheduled (make-up) race
- Updated at 25 October 2026, after one event.

== See also ==
- 2027 Alpine Skiing World Cup – Men's summary rankings
- 2027 Alpine Skiing World Cup – Men's overall
- 2027 Alpine Skiing World Cup – Men's downhill
- 2027 Alpine Skiing World Cup – Men's super-G
- 2027 Alpine Skiing World Cup – Men's slalom
- World Cup scoring system
