= Raphael Haaser =

Austrian alpine skier (born 1997)

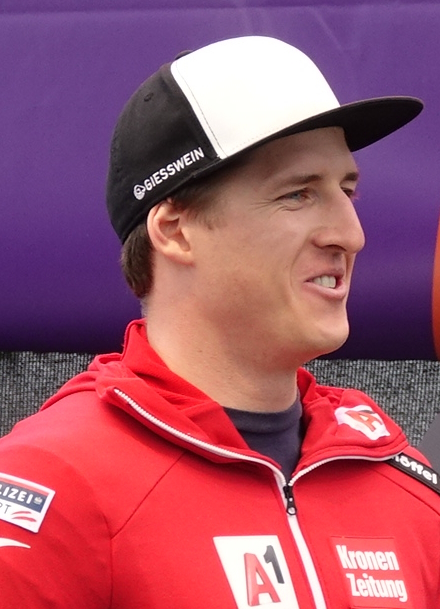
- Haaser in September 2023

Personal information
- Born: 17 September 1997 (age 29) Innsbruck, Tyrol, Austria
- Family: Ricarda Haaser (sister)

Skiing career
- Country: Austria
- Sport: Alpine skiing ♂
- Club: SV Achensee - Tirol
- Disciplines: Giant slalom, super-G, downhill
- World Cup debut: 29 February 2020 (age 22)

Olympics
- Teams: 2 – (2022, 2026)
- Medals: 0

World Championships
- Teams: 2 – (2023, 2025)
- Medals: 3 (1 gold)

World Cup
- Seasons: 7 – (2020–2026)
- Wins: 0
- Podiums: 8 – (8 SG)
- Overall titles: 0 – (12th in 2026)
- Discipline titles: 0 – (3rd in SG, 2024 and 2026)
Medal record
Men's alpine skiing
Representing Austria
World Cup race podiums
Event	1st	2nd	3rd
Super-G	0	5	3
Total	0	5	3
International alpine ski competitions
Event	1st	2nd	3rd
World Championships	1	1	1
Olympic Games	0	0	0
Total	1	1	1
World Championships
Gold medal – first place	2025 Saalbach	Giant slalom
Silver medal – second place	2025 Saalbach	Super-G
Bronze medal – third place	2023 Courchevel	Combined

Raphael Haaser (born 17 September 1997) is an Austrian World Cup alpine ski racer. He specializes in the technical event of giant slalom and super-G, a speed event.

== Career ==
Haaser achieved his first World Cup podium in December 2021, finishing second in a super-G at Bormio. At the World Championships in 2023, he took the bronze medal in the combined, following in the footsteps of his older sister Ricarda, who won the bronze in the women's combined the day before. Haaser won the gold medal in the giant slalom at the 2025 World Championships.

== Personal life ==
Haaser's sister Ricarda (b.1993) is also a World Cup ski racer.

== World Cup results ==
=== Season standings ===
Season
Season	Age	Overall	Slalom	Giant slalom	Super-G	Downhill
2020	22	146	—	—	50	—
2021	23	86	—	51	28	—
2022	24	41	—	25	8	—
2023	25	30	—	15	15	—
2024	26	15	—	21	3	45
2025	27	24	—	23	10	55
2026	28	12	—	18	3	21
2027	29	5	—	5	—	—

Standings through 26 October 2026

=== Race podiums ===
- 0 wins
- 8 podiums (8 SG); 30 top tens (19 SG, 10 GS, 1 Downhill)

Season
Season	Date	Location	Discipline	Place
2022	29 December 2021	Bormio, Italy	Super-G	2nd
2024	29 December 2023	Bormio, Italy	Super-G	2nd
2024	28 January 2024	Garmisch-Partenkirchen, Germany	Super-G	2nd
2025	24 January 2025	Kitzbühel, Austria	Super-G	2nd
2025	23 March 2025	Sun Valley, United States	Super-G	2nd
2026	27 November 2025	Copper Mountain, United States	Super-G	3rd
2026	5 December 2025	Beaver Creek, United States	Super-G	3rd
2026	22 March 2026	Kvitfjell, Norway	Super-G	3rd

== World Championship results ==
Year
Year	Age	Slalom	Giant slalom	Super-G	Downhill	Combined	Team combined	Parallel	Team event
2023	25	—	13	5	—	3	—N/a	—	—
2025	27	—	1	2	—	—N/a	—	—N/a	—

== Olympic results ==
Year
Year	Age	Slalom	Giant slalom	Super-G	Downhill	Combined	Team combined	Team event
2022	24	—	11	DNF	—	7	—N/a	—
2026	28	—	19	5	15	—N/a	4	—N/a
