= Atle Lie McGrath =

Norwegian alpine skier (born 2000)

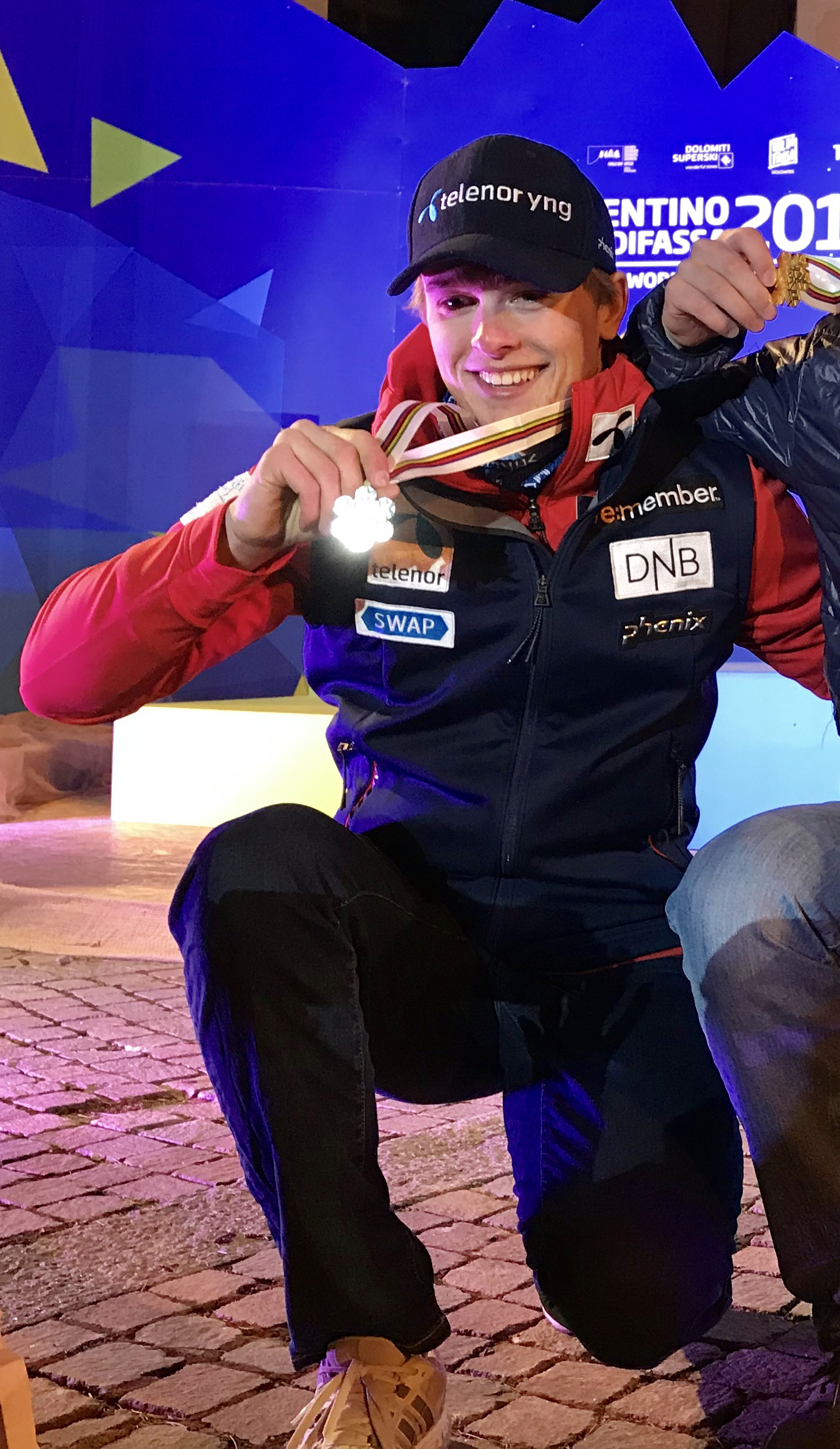
- McGrath at the 2019 Junior Championships in Val di Fassa

Personal information
- Born: 21 April 2000 (age 26) Burlington, Vermont, US
- Father: Felix McGrath

Skiing career
- Country: Norway
- Sport: Alpine skiing
- Club: Bærums SK
- Disciplines: Slalom, Giant slalom
- World Cup debut: 12 January 2019 (age 18)

Olympics
- Teams: 2 – (2022, 2026)
- Medals: 0

World Championships
- Teams: 2 – (2023, 2025)
- Medals: 1 (0 gold)

World Cup
- Seasons: 9 – (2019–2027)
- Wins: 6 – (6 SL)
- Podiums: 23 – (17 SL, 5 GS, 1 PG)
- Overall titles: 0 – (3rd in 2026)
- Discipline titles: 1 – (SL – 2026)
Medal record
Men's alpine skiing
Representing Norway
World Cup race podiums
Event	1st	2nd	3rd
Slalom	6	8	3
Giant slalom	0	1	4
Parallel	0	0	1
Total	6	9	8
World Championships
Silver medal – second place	2025 Saalbach	Slalom
Junior World Championships
Silver medal – second place	2019 Val di Fassa	Combined

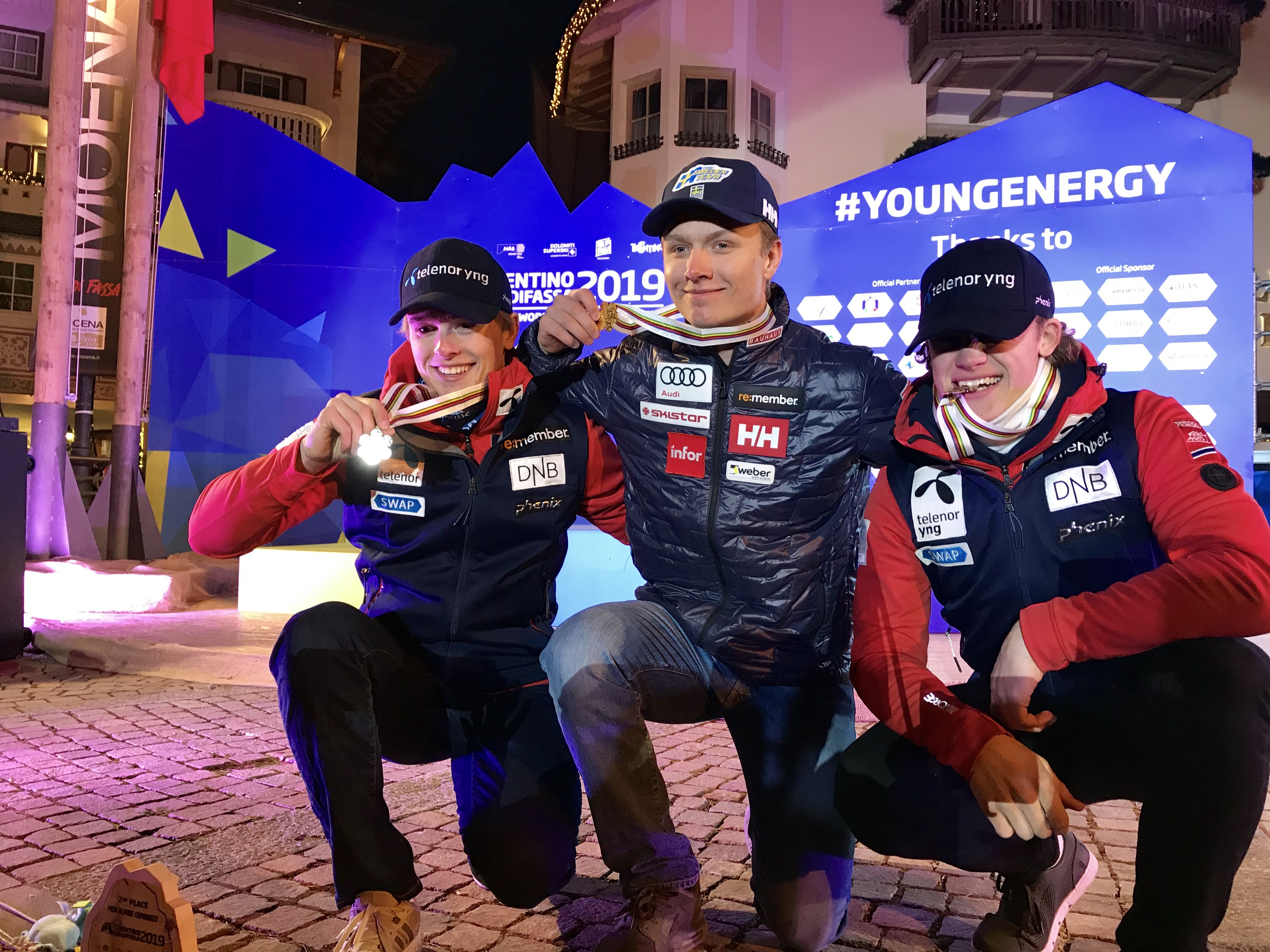
Medalists of the men's combined event at the 2019 Junior World Championships, from left to right: Lie McGrath (NOR), Tobias Hedström (SWE), Lucas Braathen (NOR)

Atle Lie McGrath (born 21 April 2000) is an American-Norwegian World Cup alpine ski racer who specializes in the technical events of slalom and giant slalom. A member of the Norwegian alpine ski team, his first World Cup podium was in December 2020 in a giant slalom at Alta Badia, Italy.

In March 2022, McGrath earned his first World Cup victory, on the slalom discipline, at Flachau, Austria.

== Early life ==
Born in the United States at Burlington, Vermont, McGrath moved with his family to Norway when he was two years old. He grew up in Oslo as a multisport athlete, also racing cross-country skiing until age 12.

== Career ==
McGrath competed at the Junior World Championships in 2018 and 2019; he raced all of the events (DH, SG, AC, GS, and SL) both years. In 2018, he was the best U18 skier in three events; in 2019, he was the silver medalist in the combined. McGrath was also fourth in the downhill, just 0.01 second from the podium.

At the 2026 Winter Olympics in Italy, McGrath had over a half-second lead in the slalom after the first run, but straddled an early gate in the second run. He competed days after his grandfather died on the day of the opening ceremony.

== Personal life ==
McGrath also played football in his childhood.

His father, American Felix McGrath, raced for the U.S. Ski Team on the World Cup circuit from 1984 through 1990. His mother, Selma Lie, was a cross-country ski racer in Norway and on the NCAA circuit for the University of Vermont. He has a younger brother named Leo.

McGrath currently trains with and represents Norwegian winter sports club Bærums SK.

== World Cup results ==
=== Season titles ===
- 1 title – (1 SL)

Season	
Season	Discipline
2026	Slalom

=== Season standings ===
Season
Season	Age	Overall	Slalom	Giant slalom	Super-G	Downhill	Combined	Parallel
2020	19	133	55	—	—	—	—	35
2021	20	56	44	21	—	—	—N/a	16
2022	21	12	3	17	—	—	—N/a	3
2023	22	20	11	18	30	—	—N/a	—N/a
2024	23	12	11	8	—	—	—N/a	—N/a
2025	24	7	5	14	—	—	—N/a	—N/a
2026	25	3	1	6	38	—	—N/a	—N/a
2027	26	18	13	—	—	—	—N/a	—N/a

Standings through 22 November 2026

=== Race podiums ===
- 6 wins – (6 SL)
- 23 podiums – (17 SL, 5 GS, 1 PG)

Season
Season	Date	Location	Discipline	Place
2021	20 December 2020	Alta Badia, Italy	Giant slalom	2nd
2022	14 November 2021	Lech/Zürs, Austria	Parallel-G	3rd
2022	25 January 2022	Schladming, Austria	Slalom	2nd
2022	9 March 2022	Flachau, Austria	Slalom	1st
2022	20 March 2022	Méribel, France	Slalom	1st
2023	8 January 2023	Adelboden, Switzerland	Slalom	2nd
2024	7 January 2024	Adelboden, Switzerland	Slalom	2nd
2024	14 January 2024	Wengen, Switzerland	Slalom	2nd
2024	1 March 2024	Aspen, United States	Giant slalom	3rd
2025	27 October 2024	Sölden, Austria	Giant slalom	3rd
2025	24 November 2024	Gurgl, Austria	Slalom	3rd
2025	15 December 2024	Val d'Isère, France	Slalom	2nd
2025	23 December 2024	Alta Badia, Italy	Slalom	3rd
2025	19 January 2025	Wengen, Switzerland	Slalom	1st
2025	16 March 2025	Hafjell, Norway	Slalom	2nd
2026	26 October 2025	Sölden, Austria	Giant slalom	3rd
2026	22 November 2025	Gurgl, Austria	Slalom	3rd
2026	22 December 2025	Alta Badia, Italy	Slalom	1st
2026	11 January 2026	Adelboden, Switzerland	Slalom	2nd
2026	18 January 2026	Wengen, Switzerland	Slalom	1st
2026	28 January 2026	Schladming, Austria	Slalom	2nd
2026	8 March 2026	Kranjska Gora, Slovenia	Slalom	1st
2026	24 March 2026	Hafjell, Norway	Giant slalom	3rd

== World Championship results ==
Year
Year	Age	Slalom	Giant slalom	Super-G	Downhill	Combined	Team combined	Parallel	Team event
2023	22	—	—	DNF	—	5	—N/a	—	—
2025	24	2	10	—	—	—N/a	DNF2	—N/a	7

== Olympic results ==
Year
Year	Age	Slalom	Giant slalom	Super-G	Downhill	Combined	Team combined	Team event
2022	21	31	DNF1	—	—	—	—N/a	—
2026	25	DNF2	5	—	—	—N/a	12	—N/a
