= Laurie Taylor (skier) =

British alpine skier (born 1996)

Personal information
- Born: 10 February 1996 (age 30) Basingstoke, England
- Website: laurietaylorski.co.uk

Skiing career
- Country: United Kingdom
- Sport: Alpine skiing
- Club: British Ski Academy
- Disciplines: Slalom, giant slalom
- World Cup debut: 5 March 2017 (age 21)

Olympics
- Teams: 2 – (2018, 2026)
- Medals: 0

World Championships
- Teams: 5 – (2017–2025)
- Medals: 0

World Cup
- Seasons: 10 – (2017–2026)
- Podiums: 0
- Overall titles: 0 – (63rd in 2026)
- Discipline titles: 0 – (21st in SL, 2026)

Laurie Taylor (born 10 February 1996) is a British World Cup alpine ski racer. He competed for Great Britain at the 2018 and 2026 Winter Olympics.

== Career ==
Taylor started skiing at the age of 6, while on holiday with family and joined the Aldershot ski race team when he was 9. He was then invited to join the British Ski Academy, the year after.

He made his Olympic debut in the PyeongChang 2018 Olympics finishing 26th overall in the slalom and 5th in the team parallel narrowly missing out on an Olympic bronze medal.

Taylor had his best World Cup finish when he came fourth in the opening slalom race of the 2025–26 season at Levi in Finland.

In January 2026 Taylor was selected to compete in his second Olympics, at the 2026 Winter Olympics held in Italy. He raced in the slalom but skied out during the first run.

== World Cup results ==
=== Season standings ===
Season
Season	Age	Overall	Slalom	Giant slalom	Super-G	Downhill
2020	24	149	56	—	—	—
2021	25	no World Cup points earned				
2022	26	145	55	—	—	—
2023	27	133	45	—	—	—
2024	28	96	33	—	—	—
2025	29	85	34	—	—	—
2026	30	63	21	—	—	—

=== Top-ten results ===
- 0 podiums; 2 top tens

Season
Season	Date	Location	Discipline	Place
2024	3 March 2024	Aspen, United States	Slalom	8th
2026	16 November 2025	Levi, Finland	Slalom	4th

== World Championship results ==
Year
Year	Age	Slalom	Giant slalom	Super-G	Downhill	Combined	Team combined	Parallel	Team event
2017	21	33	40	—	—	—	—N/a	—N/a	—
2019	23	DNF1	—	—	—	—	—N/a	—N/a	9
2021	25	DNF1	—	—	—	—	—N/a	DNQ	—
2023	27	33	—	—	—	—	—N/a	—	—
2025	29	DNF2	—	—	—	—N/a	—	—N/a	—

== Olympic results ==
Year
Year	Age	Slalom	Giant slalom	Super-G	Downhill	Combined	Team combined	Team event
2018	22	26	—	—	—	—	—N/a	5
2026	30	DNF1	—	—	—	—N/a	—	—N/a
