= 2027 Alpine Skiing World Cup – Men's slalom =

Alpine ski discipline year standings

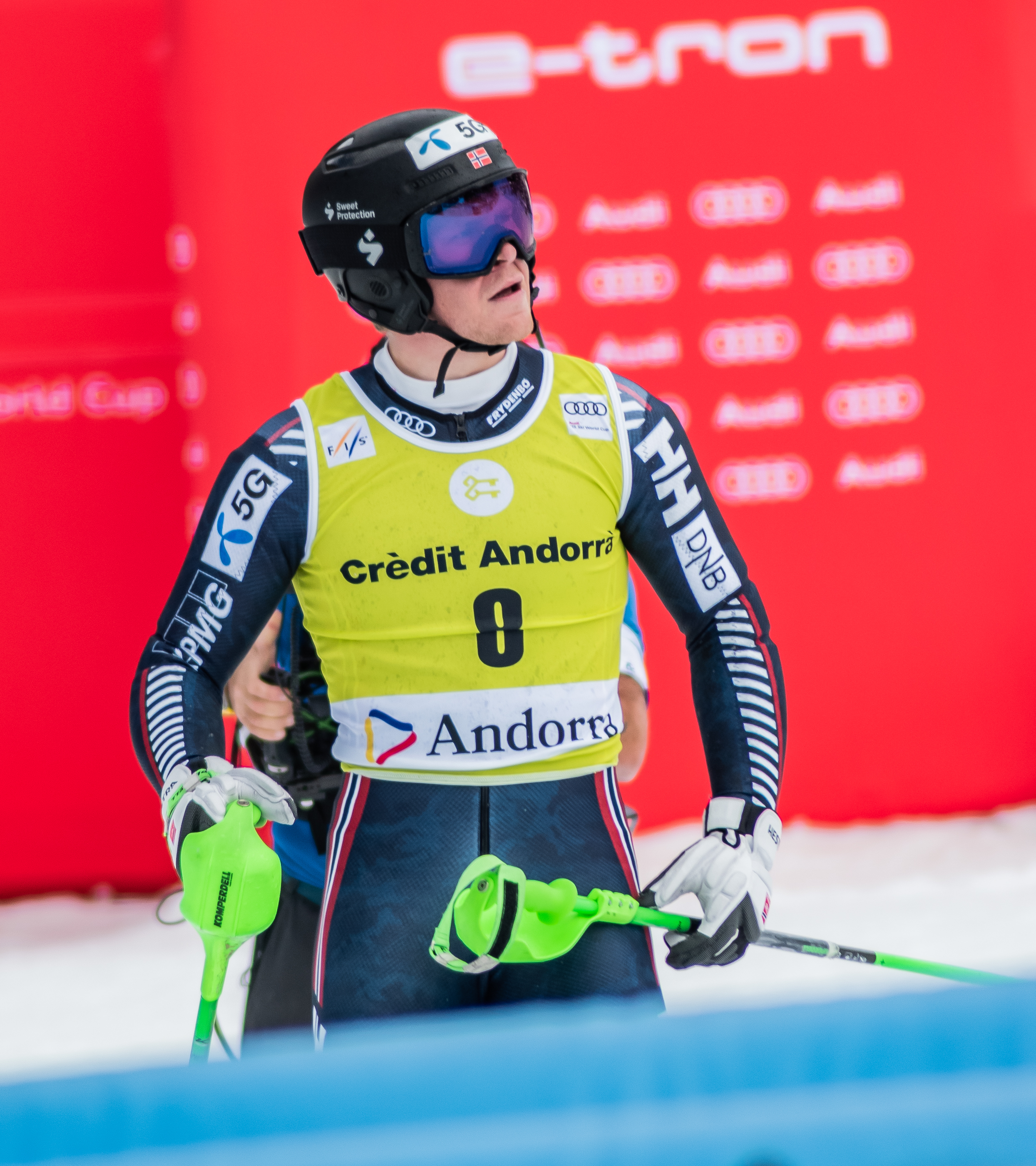
2027 Men's Slalom World Cup: Timon Haugan of Norway, current leader; 2027 Men's World Cup; Overall • Downhill • Super-G; Giant slalom • Slalom
Previous: 2026	Next: 2028

The men's slalom in the 2027 FIS Alpine Skiing World Cup is scheduled to consist of thirteen events, including the discipline final. For the third straight year, the season will open in Levi, Finland (15 November), and the entire season prior to the finals will held in Europe, consistent with the initial schedule released on 15 June 2026.

Last season, Norway's Atle Lie McGrath triumphed in a tight four-way battle that went all the way to finals, winning his first discipline championship.

As is the case every odd-numbered year, the FIS Alpine World Ski Championships will take place, this time in Crans Montana, Switzerland during 1–14 February 2027.

== Season summary ==
2023 World Cup slalom discipline champion Lucas Pinheiro Braathen, who was part of least season's four-way battle and who won the season-opening Levi slalom last year for the first World Cup victory for a competitor representing Brazil (after changing his representation to his mother's home country from Norway, his father's), repeated his Levi win to kick off the 2027 season, opening over a half-second lead over France's Clément Noël on the first run and then maintaining it on the second. The next week in Gurgl, Braathen fell on the first leg, setting up a race between Norwegians Timon Haugan and Atle Lie McGrath, and when McGrath failed to finish the second run, Haugan won his eigth World Cup race and took the discipline lead.

== Finals ==
The finals in the World Cup men's slalom discipline are scheduled for Thursday, 25 March 2027 in Sun Valley, Idaho, U.S. Only the top 25 skiers in the discipline and the winner of the 2027 FIS Junior World Championships in the discipline, plus any skiers who have scored at least 500 points in the World Cup overall classification for the season, will be eligible to compete in the final, and only the top 15 finishers will earn World Cup points.

== Standings ==
	Venue	15 Nov 2026; Levi	22 Nov 2026; Gurgl	13 Dec 2026; Val d'Isère	21 Dec 2026; Alta Badia	23 Dec 2026; Madonna di Campiglio	3 Jan 2027; Kranjska Gora	10 Jan 2027; Adelboden	17 Jan 2027; Wengen	24 Jan 2027; Kitzbühel	27 Jan 2027; Schladming	30 Jan 2027; Chamonix	14 Feb 2027; Crans Montana WC	14 Mar 2027; Åre	25 Mar 2027; Sun Valley	
#	Skier	(Finland)	(Austria)	(France)	(Italy)	(Italy)	(Slovenia)	(Switzerland)	(Switzerland)	(Austria)	(Austria)	(France)	(Switzerland)	(Sweden)	(United States)	Total
1	(Norway) Timon Haugan	13	100													113
2	(France) Clément Noël	80	24													104
3	(Brazil) Lucas Pinheiro Braathen	100	DNF1													100
4	(Sweden) Fabian Ax Swartz	50	40													90
5	(Switzerland) Tanguy Nef	22	60													82
6	(Norway) Eirik Hystad Solberg	DNQ	80													80
7	(Switzerland) Loïc Meillard	60	11													71
8	(Croatia) Samuel Kolega	29	40													69
9	(France) Paco Rassat	40	22													62
10	(Belgium) Armand Marchant	DNQ	50													50
11	(Austria) Michael Matt	DNF2	45													45
	(Italy) Alex Vinatzer	45	DNF1													45
13	(Norway) Atle Lie McGrath	36	DNF2													36
14	(Germany) Linus Straßer	20	13													33
15	(Finland) Eduard Hallberg	32	DNF1													32
	(United Kingdom) Laurie Taylor	DSQ2	32													32
17	(Switzerland) Daniel Yule	15	15													30
18	(United States) Jett Seymour	DNQ	29													29
19	(France) Auguste Aulnette	11	16													27
20	(Bulgaria) Albert Popov	26	DNF2													26
	(France) Steven Amiez	DNQ	26													26
22	(Norway) Oscar Andreas Sandvik	24	DNF1													24
23	(Austria) Joshua Sturm	DNF2	22													22
24	(Japan) Shiro Aihara	18	DNF1													18
	(Norway) Hans Grahl-Madsen	DNQ	18													18
26	(United Kingdom) Billy Major	16	DNF2													16
27	(Sweden) Gustav Wissting	14	DNS													14
	(France) Antoine Azzolin	DNQ	14													14
29	(Norway) Henrik Kristoffersen	12	DNF2													12
	(Austria) Fabio Gstrein	DNF1	12													12
31	(Canada) Liam Wallace	10	DNS													10
	(Belgium) Sam Maes	DNQ	10													10
33	(Austria) Johannes Strolz	9	DSQ1													9
	(United States) Benjamin Ritchie	DNF2	9													9
35	(Austria) Dominik Raschner	DNQ	8													8
36	(Italy) Tobias Kastlunger	DNQ	7													7
37	(Austria) Adrian Pertl	DNQ	6													6
38	(Austria) Manuel Feller	DNS														0
	(France) Victor Muffat-Jeandet	DNF2	DNQ													0
	(Italy) Tommaso Sala	DNS														0
	(Austria) Marco Schwarz	DNS														0
	(Switzerland) Matthias Iten	DNQ	DNF1													0
	(Croatia) Filip Zubčić	DNQ	DNF1													0
	(Switzerland) Ramon Zenhäusern	DNQ	DNQ													0
	(France) Hugo Desgrippes	DNQ	DNQ													0
	(Austria) Simon Rueland	DNF2	DNQ													0
	(Sweden) Kristoffer Jakobsen	DNF1	DNF1													0
	(Spain) Joaquim Salarich	DNF1	DNQ													0
	(Croatia) Istok Rodeš	DNQ	DNF1													0
	(United States) Luke Winters	DNS														0
	(Japan) Yohei Koyama	DNF1	DNF1													0
	(Finland) Jesper Pohjolainen	DNQ	DNF2													0
	(Norway) Theodor Brækken	DNS														0
	(Italy) Matteo Canins	DNQ	DNF1													0
	(United States) Cooper Puckett	DNQ	DNF1													0
	(Spain) Juan del Campo	DNF1	DNF1													0
	(Italy) Tommaso Saccardi	DNQ	DNF1													0
	(Italy) Corrado Barbera	DNQ	DNQ													0
	References															

=== Legend ===
- Winner (100 points)
- 2nd place (80 points)
- 3rd place (60 points)
- DNQ = Did not qualify for run 2
- DNF1 = Did not finish run 1
- DSQ1 = Disqualified run 1
- DNF2 = Did not finish run 2
- DSQ2 = Disqualified run 2
- DNS2 = Did not start run 2
- Did not start (DNS)
- Not eligible for finals (NE)
- Race canceled (x)
- FIS non-World Cup race (Olympics)
- R# = Rescheduled (make-up) race
- Updated at 22 November 2026, after two events.

== See also ==
- 2027 Alpine Skiing World Cup – Men's summary rankings
- 2027 Alpine Skiing World Cup – Men's overall
- 2027 Alpine Skiing World Cup – Men's downhill
- 2027 Alpine Skiing World Cup – Men's super-G
- 2027 Alpine Skiing World Cup – Men's giant slalom
- World Cup scoring system
