= 2027 Alpine Skiing World Cup – Men's super-G =

Alpine ski discipline year standings

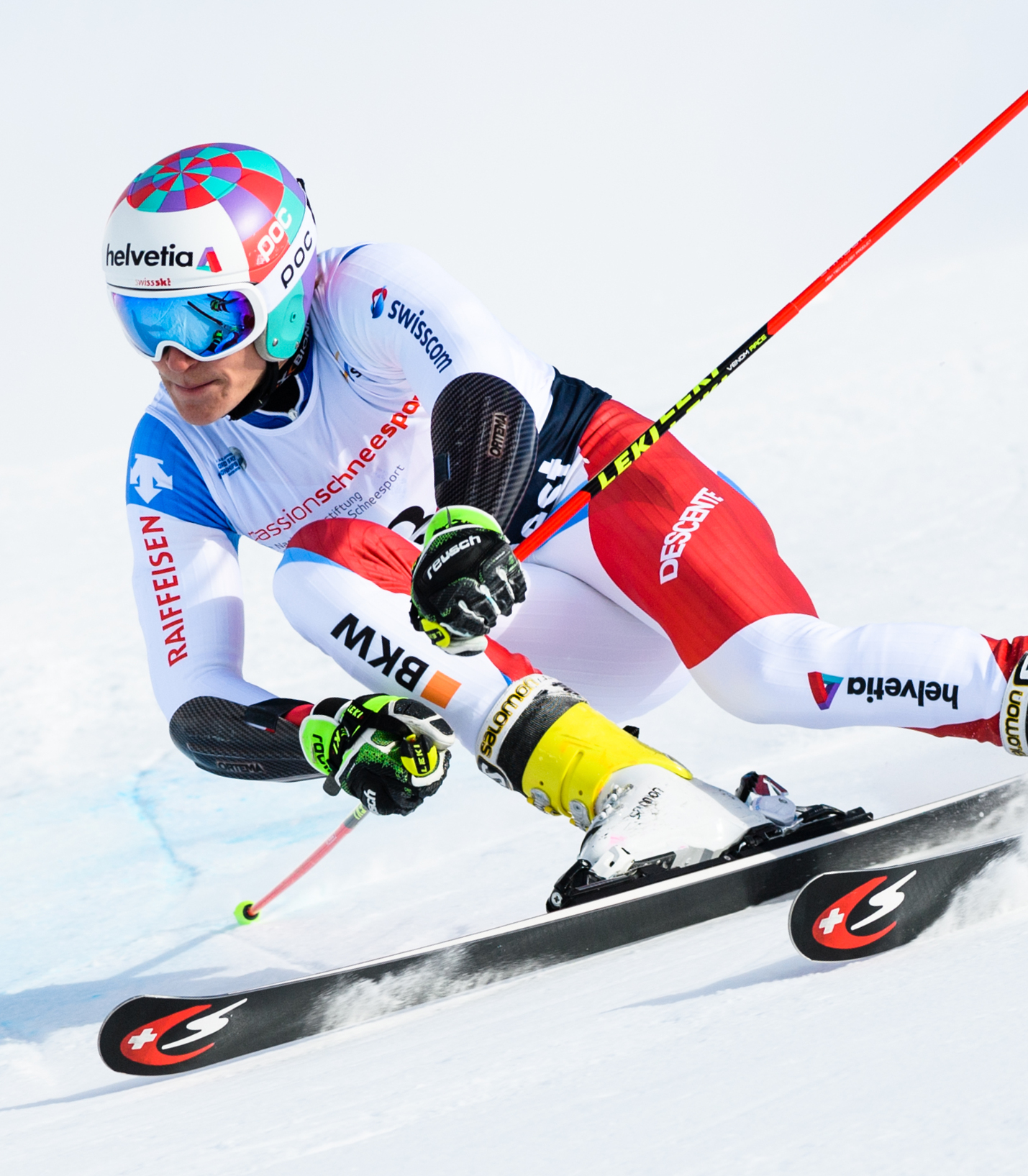
2027 Men's Super-G World Cup: Marco Odermatt of Switzerland, defending champion; 2027 Men's World Cup; Overall • Downhill • Super-G; Giant slalom • Slalom
Previous: 2026	Next: 2028

The men's super-G in the 2027 FIS Alpine Skiing World Cup is scheduled to consist of ten events, including the finals. The season is scheduled to begin and end in the U.S., with a super-G at Copper Mountain, Colorado (U.S.) on 28 November 2026 (for the second straight year) followed by a visit to nearby Beaver Creek on 5 December 2026, and then to return for the finals in Sun Valley, Idaho. According to the initial schedule released on 15 June 2026, the rest of the season will take place in Europe, where each super-G will be coupled with a downhill on the same course.

Last year, for the fourth consecutive season, Marco Odermatt of Switzerland won the discipline championship, and he is the preliminary favorite again in 2027.

As is the case every odd-numbered year, the FIS Alpine World Ski Championships will take place, this time in Crans Montana, Switzerland during 1–14 February 2027. The men's super-G will be held on Friday, 5 February 2027.

== Season summary ==
To be added after the start of the season. . . .

== Finals ==
The World Cup finals in the men's super-G discipline will be held on Sunday, 21 March 2027 in Sun Valley, Idaho, U.S. Only the top 25 skiers in the discipline and the winner of the 2027 FIS Junior World Championships in the discipline, plus any skiers who have scored at least 500 points in the World Cup overall classification for the season prior to the race, will be eligible to compete in the finals, and only the top 15 finishers will earn World Cup points.

== Standings ==
	Venue	28 Nov 2026; Copper Mountain	5 Dec 2026; Beaver Creek	18 Dec 2026; Val Gardena/Gröden	29 Dec 2026; Bormio	15 Jan 2027; Wengen	22 Jan 2027; Kitzbühel	5 Feb 2027; Crans Montana WC	21 Feb 2027; Garmisch	28 Feb 2027; Saalbach	7 Mar 2027; Kvitfjell	21 Mar 2027; Sun Valley	
#	Skier	(United States)	(United States)	(Italy)	(Italy)	(Switzerland)	(Austria)	(Switzerland)	(Germany)	(Austria)	(Norway)	(United States)	Total
1	(Switzerland) Marco Odermatt												0
	(Austria) Vincent Kriechmayr												0
	(Austria) Raphael Haaser												0
	(Italy) Giovanni Franzoni												0
	(Italy) Dominik Paris												0
	(Switzerland) Franjo von Allmen												0
	(Austria) Stefan Babinsky												0
	(Switzerland) Stefan Rogentin												0
	(Switzerland) Alexis Monney												0
	(Austria) Marco Schwarz												0
	(Norway) Fredrik Møller												0
	(Czech Republic) Jan Zabystřan												0
	(France) Nils Allègre												0
	(Italy) Mattia Casse												0
	(United States) Ryan Cochran-Siegle												0
	(Norway) Adrian Smiseth Sejersted												0
	(Austria) Daniel Hemetsberger												0
	(Italy) Guglielmo Bosca												0
	(Austria) Lukas Feurstein												0
	(Italy) Christof Innerhofer												0
	(Germany) Simon Jocher												0
	(Canada) James Crawford												0
	(France) Matthieu Bailet												0
	(Canada) Cameron Alexander												0
	(United States) River Radamus												0
	(United States) Kyle Negomir												0
	(Switzerland) Loïc Meillard												0
	(Austria) Stefan Eichberger												0
	(Switzerland) Marco Kohler												0
	(France) Alban Elezi Cannaferina												0
	(Slovenia) Miha Hrobat												0
	(Canada) Brodie Seger												0
	(United States) Sam Morse												0
	(Switzerland) Justin Murisier												0
	(France) Sam Alphand												0
	(Italy) Benjamin Jacques Alliod												0
	(Norway) Atle Lie McGrath												0
	(Italy) Florian Schieder												0
	(France) Nils Alphand												0
	(Austria) Vincent Wieser												0
	(Canada) Jeffrey Read												0
	(Austria) Andreas Ploier												0
	(France) Blaise Giezendanner												0
	(Canada) Raphaël Lessard												0
	(Norway) Aleksander Aamodt Kilde												0
	(Switzerland) Alessio Miggiano												0
	(Italy) Nicolo Molteni												0
	(Finland) Elian Lehto												0
	(United States) Jared Goldberg												0
	(United States) Bryce Bennett												0
	(Italy) Max Perathoner												0
	References												

=== Legend ===
- Winner (100 points)
- 2nd place (80 points)
- 3rd place (60 points)
- DNF = Did not finish
- DSQ = Disqualified
- Did not start (DNS)
- Not eligible for finals (NE)
- Race canceled (x)
- FIS non-World Cup race (Olympics)
- R# = Rescheduled (make-up) race
- Updated at 21 November 2026, before all events.

== See also ==
- 2026 Alpine Skiing World Cup – Men's summary rankings
- 2027 Alpine Skiing World Cup – Men's overall
- 2027 Alpine Skiing World Cup – Men's downhill
- 2027 Alpine Skiing World Cup – Men's giant slalom
- 2027 Alpine Skiing World Cup – Men's slalom
- World Cup scoring system
