= Alessio Miggiano =

Swiss alpine skier (born 2002)

Personal information
- Born: 30 March 2002 (age 24) Bubikon, Switzerland
- Website: alessiomiggiano.ch

Skiing career
- Country: Switzerland
- Sport: Alpine skiing
- Club: Renngruppe Zürcher Oberland
- Coached by: Franz Heinzer
- Disciplines: Downhill, super-G
- World Cup debut: 21 December 2024 (age 22)

Olympics
- Teams: 0

World Championships
- Teams: 0

World Cup
- Seasons: 2 – (2025–2026)
- Podiums: 0
- Overall titles: 0 – (60th in 2026)
- Discipline titles: 0 – (20th in DH, 2026)

Alessio Miggiano (born 30 March 2002) is a Swiss World Cup alpine ski racerwho specializes in the speed events of downhill and super-G.

== Biography ==
Miggiano grew up in Bubikon in the Zurich Oberland region. His father Domenico, who came from southern Italy, and his mother Rita have run the Gasthof Löwen there since 2000; the restaurant has been awarded one Michelin star and 16 Gault-Millau points.

== Career ==
Miggiano joined the Renngruppe Zürcher Oberland (Zurich Oberland racing team) when he was six years old and made his international debut at FIS-level as a 16-year old in 2018. He joined the Swiss ski team before the 2022–23 season, where he was coached by former World Cup downhill champion Franz Heinzer; he began racing regularly on the Europa Cup during the same season and the oncoming one.

In December 2024 Miggiano earned his first start on the World Cup by finishing in a surprising sixth place during one of the downhill training runs at Val Gardena. He finished 46th in his World Cup debut a couple of days after this training result. Miggiano then competed successfully in the 2024–25 Europa Cup; he recorded 11 top tens and his first victory on that tour. He ended the season as 2nd in the downhill standings, guaranteeing him starts on every World Cup downhill for the next season.

Miggiano's return to Val Gardena a year after his debut proved he could be competitive at the World Cup level. On three consecutive days there he placed 18th in a downhill (earning his first World Cup points), 21st in his first World Cup super-G, then 5th in a second downhill where he was just 0.06 seconds off the podium. These results meant he had met the minimum qualification standard for the Swiss team at the upcoming 2026 Winter Olympics. Due to the depth of the Swiss men's team, however, Miggiano was not among the 11 athletes selected to participate in the Olympics. Despite that disappointment, he achieved his second career top ten in the last downhill before the Games at Crans-Montana, which secured him enough points to qualify for the downhill at the World Cup finals to be held at Kvitfjell, Norway.

== World Cup results ==
=== Season standings ===
Season
| Season | Age | Overall | Slalom | Giant slalom | Super-G | Downhill |
| 2026 | 23 | 60 | — | — | 48 | 20 |

=== Top-ten results ===
- 0 podiums, 2 top tens

Season
| Season | Date | Location | Discipline | Place |
| 2026 | 20 December 2025 | Val Gardena, Italy | Downhill | 5th |
| 2026 | 1 February 2026 | Crans-Montana, Switzerland | Downhill | 8th |
