= 2026 Alpine Skiing World Cup – Men's giant slalom =

Alpine ski discipline year standings

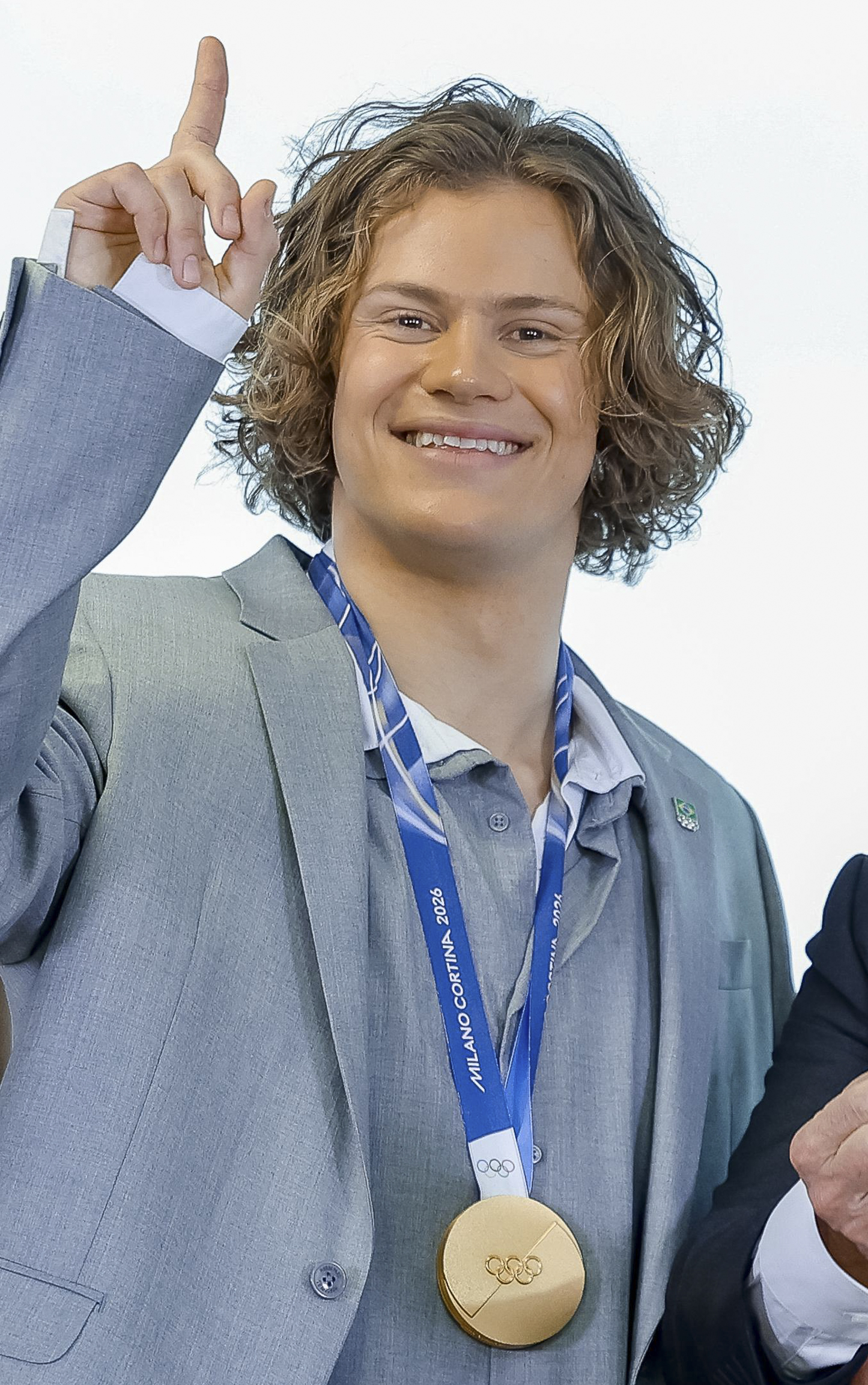
2026 Men's Giant slalom World Cup: Lucas Pinheiro Braathen of Brazil, season champion; 2026 Men's World Cup; Overall • Downhill • Super-G; Giant slalom • Slalom
Previous: 2025	Next: 2027

The men's giant slalom in the 2026 FIS Alpine Skiing World Cup consisted of nine events, including the final. The season began with the traditional opener: a giant slalom on the Rettenbach ski course, located on the Rettenbach glacier in Sölden, Austria, on 26 October 2025. The next two giant slaloms took place in the United States in late November and early December, including the first World Cup visit to Copper Mountain (Colorado) for the men since 1976, after which the remainder of the races were held in Europe on the same courses used during the 2025 season. The season championship was won by Brazil's Lucas Pinheiro Braathen, who ended Marco Odermatt's four-year hold on the discipline by winning the finals.

The season was interrupted for the quadrennial 2026 Winter Olympics in three regions in Italy – Milan, the Stelvio Pass, and Cortina d'Ampezzo – during 6–22 February 2026. All of the Alpine skiing events for men took place on the classic Stelvio course at Bormio. The championship in men's giant slalom is scheduled to be held on Saturday, 14 February. Braathen also won the Olympic gold medal in giant slalom over runner-up Odermatt.

== Season summary ==
Although the first race of the World Cup giant slalom season at Sölden went to four-time defending discipline champion Marco Odermatt, as expected, the race saw a long-delayed restart to the "Battle of the Marcos", as both heats were tight battles between Odermatt and Austrian former slalom champion Marco Schwarz, finally returning to form after a catastrophic injury almost two years ago (when Schwarz was narrowly leading Odermatt for the overall World Cup title). However, in the next race, which took place at Copper Mountain in the U.S., Odermatt went off course and failed to finish the first run, which led to an upset first World Cup victory by Austria's Stefan Brennsteiner, who drew the #1 starting position in the first run, and also led to Brennsteiner taking the overall lead in the discipline over Schwarz, who finished fourth. The final race in the U.S. for the 2026 season was a giant slalom at Beaver Creek, and Odermatt returned to form with his second win in the three-race series there (and his fifth overall at Beaver Creek, but his first GS there), which allowed Odermatt to move into a tie for first in the discipline with Brennsteiner.

The next week at Val d'Isère, France, the Swiss team swept the podium; the winner was Loïc Meillard, who came from fifth to earn the victory, while first-run leader Brennsteiner fell back to fifth, allowing Odermatt (who placed third) to regain the solo discipline lead. A week later, Schwarz finally returned to the top step of the podium for the first time in two full years (22 December 2023, in slalom, a week prior to his injury), after building a dominating lead on the first run and then holding off Brazil's Lucas Pinheiro Braathen on the second, while Brennsteiner, who occupied the bottom step on the podium, moved past Odermatt (sixth) to regain the discipline lead by 5 points. In the first giant slalom after the Christmas break, at Adelboden, Switzerland, the see-saw continued, as Odermatt built a half-second lead over Braathen on the first run and matched his time on the second, taking both the win (his fifth straight in the GS there) and the discipline lead when Brennsteiner failed to complete the second run. The last giant slalom before the Winter Olympics, a night race under the lights at Schladming, Austria, featured a neck-and-neck first run between Meillard and Braathen, only for Meillard to win the second run by about three-quarters of a second over Braathen for his second victory of the year; Odermatt's fourth place left him with a lead of 103 points over Braathen, his closest pursuer, with only two more races in the discipline after the Olympics.

At the Milan Cortina Winter Olympics, Braathen raced down the hill as the first starter and, at the end of the first run, held a 0.95 second lead over Odermatt, followed by two more Swiss (Meillard and Thomas Tumler), and -- despite the fact that the Swiss coach got the right to set the course in the second run -- Braathen lost less than half of that lead on the second run to earn the gold for Brazil's (and South America's) first Winter Olympic medal ever, with Odermatt silver (his third medal of the games) and Meillard bronze (his second). The first giant slalom after the Olympics, in Kranjska Gora (Slovenia), had a very similar result, with Braathen holding a large lead over two Swiss (Meillard and Brennsteiner) after the first run and maintaining it, allowing him to close within 48 points of Odermatt (who was fifth) for the discipline title, with just the finals remaining.

== Finals ==
The World Cup finals in the discipline are scheduled to take place on Tuesday, 24 March 2026 on the Olympialøypa course at Hafjell, near Lillehammer, Norway. Only the top 25 skiers in the World Cup giant slalom discipline and the winner of the 2026 FIS Junior World Championships in the discipline (Rasmus Bakkevig of Norway), plus any skiers who have scored at least 500 points in the World Cup overall classification for the season, will be eligible to compete in the final, and only the top 15 will earn World Cup points. One 500-plus point skier (Giovanni Franzoni of Italy, who competed in GS occasionally during the season) registered, as well as all 25 qualified competitors and Bakkevig, so the field was set at 27. In the first run, Odermatt struggled on the soft snow and failed to finish, meaning that either Braathen or Meillard (who were in the top three after the first run, with Braathen leading) would win the season title if he won the race; they both rose to the occasion, with Meillard holding the lead with just Braathen to go, but Braathen's second run gave him the title by over half a second, with Odermatt second and Meillard third for the season.

== Standings ==
	Venue	26 Oct 2025; Sölden	28 Nov 2025; Copper Mountain	7 Dec 2025; Beaver Creek	13 Dec 2025; Val d'Isère	21 Dec 2025; Alta Badia	10 Jan 2026; Adelboden	27 Jan 2026; Schladming	14 Feb 2026; Bormio	7 Mar 2026; Kranjska Gora	24 Mar 2026; Hafjell	
#	Skier	(Austria)	(United States)	(United States)	(France)	(Italy)	(Switzerland)	(Austria)	(Italy)	(Slovenia)	(Norway)	Total
	(Brazil) Lucas Pinheiro Braathen	DNF1	26	45	36	80	80	80	①	100	100	547
2	(Switzerland) Marco Odermatt	100	DNF1	100	60	40	100	50	②	45	DNF1	495
3	(Switzerland) Loïc Meillard	18	13	29	100	26	40	100	③	80	80	486
4	(Austria) Stefan Brennsteiner	50	100	50	45	60	DNF2	16	⑧	60	50	431
5	(Austria) Marco Schwarz	80	50	9	13	100	DNF2	32	⑨	26	29	339
6	(Norway) Atle Lie McGrath	60	DNQ	36	14	50	24	36	⑤	50	60	330
7	(Norway) Henrik Kristoffersen	36	80	60	24	24	45	13	⑦	36	0	318
8	(Norway) Timon Haugan	22	DNF1	14	50	29	50	45	⑪	22	45	232
9	(Italy) Alex Vinatzer	32	45	80	32	18	5	DSQ2	DNF2	12	0	224
10	(United States) River Radamus	10	16	40	40	36	36	DNF2	⑰	11	18	207
11	(Germany) Fabian Gratz	14	20	DNF2	22	45	29	24	DNF2	14	26	194
12	(Belgium) Sam Maes	11	36	22	DNF2	14	12	40	DNF1	14	40	189
13	(Switzerland) Luca Aerni	1	12	20	80	20	26	DNF1	⑱	18	0	177
14	(France) Léo Anguenot	DNF1	36	13	12	3	60	8	⑥	40	DNF2	172
15	(Slovenia) Žan Kranjec	29	40	7	11	18	16	20	⑫	24	0	169
16	(France) Alexis Pinturault	13	22	24	9	13	22	6	DNS	15	24	148
17	(Germany) Anton Grammel	24	12	DNQ	DNQ	DNQ	9	26	⑮	32	36	139
18	(Austria) Raphael Haaser	40	6	3	15	DNQ	32	9	⑲	29	DNF1	134
19	(Croatia) Filip Zubčić	16	60	DNQ	7	DNQ	DNQ	18	⑭	10	20	131
20	(Switzerland) Thomas Tumler	15	29	18	9	16	22	DNF1	④	16	0	125
21	(France) Alban Elezi Cannaferina	6	DNF1	15	DNQ	8	14	60	DNF2	DNF1	DNF1	103
22	(France) Thibaut Favrot	45	9	32	4	5	DNF2	DNF1	DNS	6	DNF1	101
23	(Austria) Joshua Sturm	DNQ	7	DNQ	10	DNF1	18	22	DNS	8	36	101
24	(Austria) Patrick Feurstein	DNQ	14	DNQ	29	32	DNQ	15	⑯	DNF2	0	90
25	(Germany) Jonas Stockinger	12	DNF1	DNQ	20	DNQ	DNQ	10	DNS	20	24	86
26	(Andorra) Joan Verdú	22	15	DNF2	DNF2	12	11	DNF1	⑩	DNF1	NE	60
27	(Germany) Alexander Schmid	4	26	DSQ1	20	9	DNF2	DNS	⑬	DNQ	NE	59
28	(Norway) Eirik Hystad Solberg	6	18	DNQ	6	15	DNQ	12	DNF1	DNQ	NE	57
29	(Italy) Giovanni Borsotti	7	2	11	DNF2	DNS		29	DNS	DSQ2	NE	49
30	(France) Flavio Vitale	26	DNF2	10	DNQ	DNQ	7	DNF1	DNS	DNQ	NE	43
31	(Austria) Lukas Feurstein	DNQ	DNF1	26	DNQ	2	10	DNF1	DNS	DNQ	NE	38
32	(United States) Ryder Sarchett	DNQ	DNQ	6	26	DNQ	DNQ	DNF1	㉕	5	NE	37
33	(Italy) Filippo Della Vite	DNQ	DNQ	6	16	4	DNF1	DNF1	DNS	10	NE	36
34	(France) Loévan Parand	DNQ	10	DNQ	DNF1	11	15	DNF1	DNS	DNQ	NE	36
35	(Sweden) Fabian Ax Swartz	DNQ	DNQ	DNQ	DNF1	10	10	14	㉒	DNQ	NE	32
36	(Italy) Luca De Aliprandini	9	5	DNQ	5	DNQ	13	DNQ	DNF1	DNQ	NE	32
37	(Norway) Oscar Andreas Sandvik	DNF1	DNF1	16	DNF1	DNQ	DNF1	DNF1	DNS	DNS	NE	16
37	(Norway) Rasmus Bakkevig	DNQ	DNS		DNQ	DNQ	DNQ	DNS			16	16
39	(Canada) Erik Read	DNQ	4	DNQ	DNQ	DNQ	DNQ	11	DNS	DNQ	NE	15
40	(Spain) Albert Ortega Fornesa	DNS	8	DNQ	DNQ	DNQ	6	DNQ	DNS	DNQ	NE	14
41	(Switzerland) Lenz Hächler	DNF1	DNF1	12	DNQ	DNQ	DNQ	DNS		DNQ	NE	12
42	(Estonia) Tormis Laine	8	3	DNQ	DNQ	DNQ	DNQ	DNQ	㉘	DNF1	NE	11
43	(Slovakia) Andreas Žampa	3	DNQ	DNQ	DNQ	DNQ	DNQ	7	㉑	DNQ	NE	10
44	(Sweden) William Hansson	DNQ	DNQ	8	DNS	DNQ	DNF1	DNF1	DNS	DNF1	NE	8
45	(Spain) Aleix Aubert Serracanta	DNQ	DNS			7	DNF1	DNQ	DNS	DNF1	NE	7
45	(Switzerland) Fadri Janutin	DNQ	DNQ	DNS	DNQ	DNQ	DNQ	DNQ	DNS	7	NE	7
47	(Italy) Tobias Kastlunger	DNQ	DNQ	DNS	DNQ	6	DNQ	DNQ	DNF1	DNQ	NE	6
48	(France) Guerlain Favre	DNQ	DNQ	DNF1	DNQ	DNQ	DNQ	5	DNS	DNQ	NE	5
49	(United States) Bridger Gile	DNF1	DNF1	DNQ	DNQ	DNF2	DNQ	DNQ	DNS	4	NE	4
49	(United States) George Steffey	DNS	DNQ	4	DSQ1	DNQ	DNQ	DNS			NE	4
49	(Italy) Simon Talacci	DNS			DNQ	DNQ	DNQ	4	DNS	DNF1	NE	4
52	(Austria) Vincent Kriechmayr	2	DNS									2
	References											

=== Legend ===
- Winner (100 points)
- 2nd place (80 points)
- 3rd place (60 points)
- DNQ = Did not qualify for run 2
- DNF1 = Did not finish run 1
- DSQ1 = Disqualified run 1
- DNF2 = Did not finish run 2
- DSQ2 = Disqualified run 2
- DNS2 = Did not start run 2
- Did not start (DNS)
- Not eligible for finals (NE)
- Race canceled (x)
- FIS non-World Cup race (Olympics)
- R# = Rescheduled (make-up) race
- Updated at 24 March 2026, after all events.

== See also ==
- 2026 Alpine Skiing World Cup – Men's summary rankings
- 2026 Alpine Skiing World Cup – Men's overall
- 2026 Alpine Skiing World Cup – Men's downhill
- 2026 Alpine Skiing World Cup – Men's super-G
- 2026 Alpine Skiing World Cup – Men's slalom
- World Cup scoring system
