= 2027 Alpine Skiing World Cup – Men's downhill =

Alpine ski discipline year standings

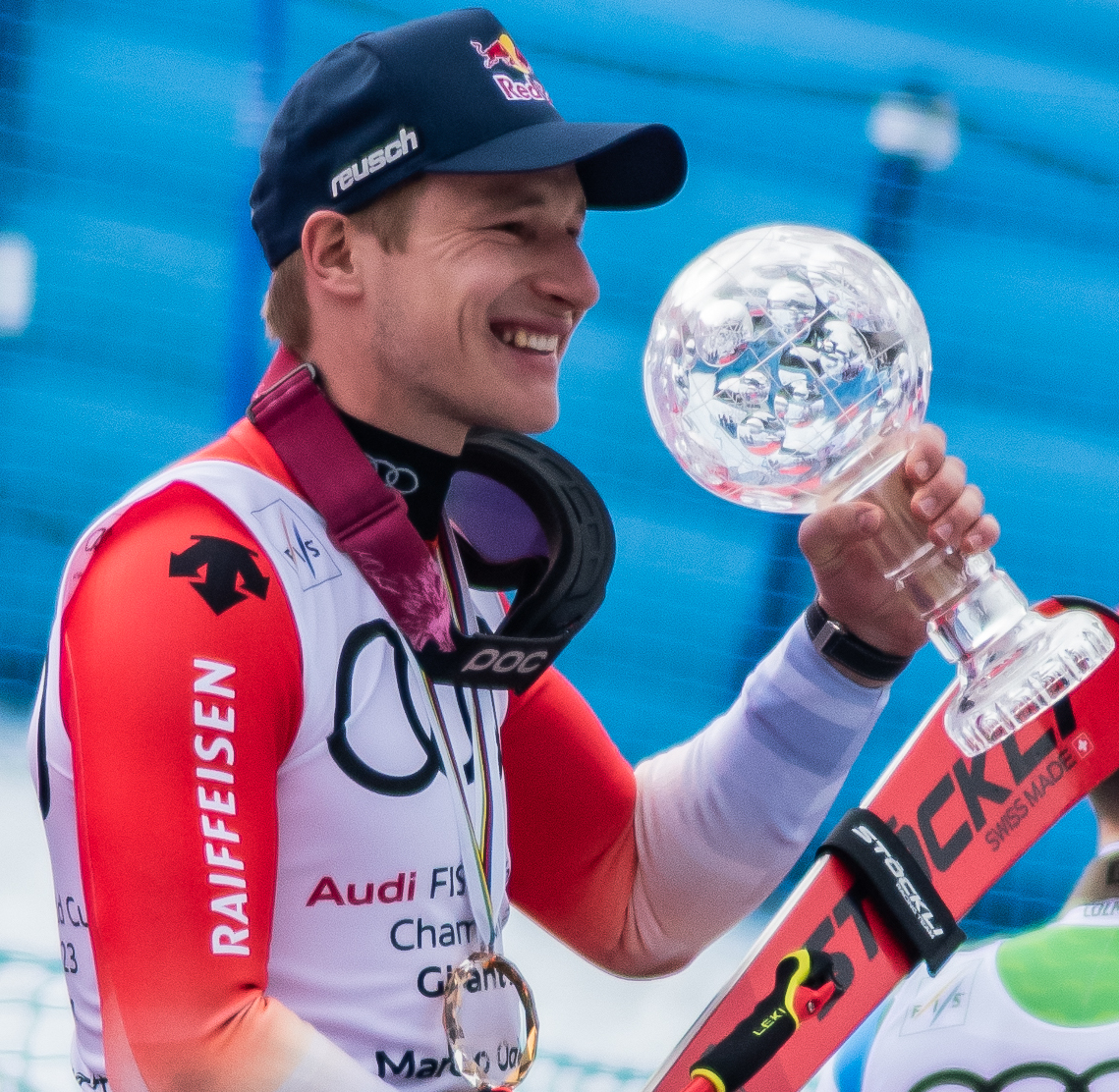
2027 Men's Downhill World Cup: Marco Odermatt of Switzerland, defending champion; 2027 Men's World Cup; Overall • Downhill • Super-G; Giant slalom • Slalom
Previous: 2026	Next: 2028

The men's downhill in the 2027 FIS Alpine Skiing World Cup is scheduled to consist of ten events, including the final. The season is scheduled to begin with two downhills at Beaver Creek, Colorado (U.S.) on 3-4 December 2026, then to proceed to Europe for the remainder of the races until the finals, according to the initial schedule released on 15 June 2026. The World Cup Finals will be held in Sun Valley, Idaho (U.S.) from 20 to 25 March 2027.

In 2026, Swiss three-event star Marco Odermatt won his third consecutive World Cup title in downhill, and he is also the favorite to repeat in 2027.

As is the case every odd-numbered year, the FIS Alpine World Ski Championships will take place, this time in Crans Montana, Switzerland during 1–14 February 2027. The men's downhill will be held on Sunday, 7 February 2027.

== Season summary ==
To be added after start of season. . .

== Finals ==
The World Cup finals in the men's downhill discipline will be held on Saturday, 20 March 2027 in Sun Valley, Idaho, U.S. Only the top 25 skiers in the discipline and the winner of the 2027 FIS Junior World Championships in the discipline, plus any skiers who have scored at least 500 points in the World Cup overall classification for the season prior to the race, will be eligible to compete in the finals, and only the top 15 finishers will earn World Cup points.

== Standings ==
	Venue	3 Dec 2026; Beaver Creek	4 Dec 2026; Beaver Creek	19 Dec 2026; Val Gardena/Gröden	28 Dec 2026; Bormio	16 Jan 2027; Wengen	23 Jan 2027; Kitzbühel	7 Feb 2027; Crans Montana WC	20 Feb 2027; Garmisch	27 Feb 2027; Saalbach	6 Mar 2027; Kvitfjell	20 Mar 2027; Sun Valley	
#	Skier	(United States)	(United States)	(Italy)	(Italy)	(Switzerland)	(Austria)	(Switzerland)	(Germany)	(Austria)	(Norway)	(United States)	Total
1	(Switzerland) Marco Odermatt												0
	(Switzerland) Franjo von Allmen												0
	(Italy) Dominik Paris												0
	(Austria) Vincent Kriechmayr												0
	(Italy) Giovanni Franzoni												0
	(Italy) Florian Schieder												0
	(Switzerland) Alexis Monney												0
	(France) Nils Allègre												0
	(United States) Ryan Cochran-Siegle												0
	(Switzerland) Stefan Rogentin												0
	(Italy) Mattia Casse												0
	(Austria) Daniel Hemetsberger												0
	(France) Maxence Muzaton												0
	(Slovenia) Miha Hrobat												0
	(Canada) Cameron Alexander												0
	(Norway) Adrian Smiseth Sejersted												0
	(Italy) Benjamin Alliod												0
	(Switzerland) Niels Hintermann												0
	(Switzerland) Justin Murisier												0
	(Switzerland) Alessio Miggiano												0
	(Austria) Raphael Haaser												0
	(France) Nils Alphand												0
	(Italy) Christof Innerhofer												0
	(Finland) Elian Lehto												0
	(Slovenia) Martin Čater												0
	(Switzerland) Lars Rösti												0
	(Germany) Luis Vogt												0
	(Austria) Stefan Babinsky												0
	(Sweden) Felix Monsén												0
	(Switzerland) Marco Kohler												0
	(France) Blaise Giezendanner												0
	(United States) Kyle Negomir												0
	(United States) Erik Arvidsson												0
	(Germany) Simon Jocher												0
	(Austria) Stefan Eichberger												0
	(France) Adrien Théaux												0
	(United States) Bryce Bennett												0
	(Canada) James Crawford												0
	(Austria) Andreas Ploier												0
	(United States) Wiley Maple												0
	(France) Alban Elezi Cannaferina												0
	(Norway) Aleksander Aamodt Kilde												0
	(Switzerland) Livio Hiltbrand												0
	(Austria) Stefan Rieser												0
	(Chile) Henrik Von Appen												0
	(Germany) Romed Baumann												0
	(Switzerland) Arnaud Boisset												0
	(Canada) Brodie Seger												0
	(France) Charles Gamel Seigneur												0
	(France) Matthieu Bailet												0
	(Italy) Guglielmo Bosca												0
	(France) Sam Alphand												0
	(Austria) Vincent Wieser												0
	(Austria) Manuel Traninger												0
	(United States) Sam Morse												0
	(Czech Republic) Jan Zabystřan												0
	(Canada) Jeffrey Read												0
	(Slovenia) Nejc Naraločnik												0
	(Austria) Marco Schwarz												0
	(Norway) Fredrik Møller												0
	References												

=== Legend ===
- Winner (100 points)
- 2nd place (80 points)
- 3rd place (60 points)
- DNF = Did not finish
- DSQ = Disqualified
- Did not start (DNS)
- Not eligible for finals (NE)
- Race canceled (x)
- FIS non-World Cup race (Olympics)
- R# = Rescheduled (make-up) race
- Updated at 21 November 2026, before all events.

== See also ==
- 2027 Alpine Skiing World Cup – Men's summary rankings
- 2027 Alpine Skiing World Cup – Men's overall
- 2027 Alpine Skiing World Cup – Men's super-G
- 2027 Alpine Skiing World Cup – Men's giant slalom
- 2027 Alpine Skiing World Cup – Men's slalom
- World Cup scoring system
