= Sam Maes =

Belgian alpine skier (born 1998)

Personal information
- Born: 7 June 1998 (age 28) Edegem, Belgium
- Website: www.sammaes.com

Skiing career
- Country: Belgium
- Sport: Alpine skiing ♂
- Club: Snow Valley Racing Team
- Disciplines: Giant slalom, Slalom
- World Cup debut: 18 November 2018 (age 20)

Olympics
- Teams: 3 – (2018, 2022, 2026)
- Medals: 0

World Championships
- Teams: 3 – (2019, 2023, 2025)
- Medals: 0

World Cup
- Seasons: 8 – (2019–2026)
- Podiums: 0
- Overall titles: 0 – (32nd in 2026)
- Discipline titles: 0 – (12th in GS, 2026)
Medal record
Men's alpine skiing
Representing Belgium
Junior World Championships
Bronze medal – third place	2019 Val di Fassa	Slalom
Bronze medal – third place	2019 Val di Fassa	Giant slalom
- Updated on 25 March 2026

Sam Maes (born 7 June 1998) is a Belgian alpine skier who competes in the technical events of giant slalom and slalom, specializing in the giant slalom. He competed in the men's slalom and giant slalom at the 2018, 2022 and 2026 Winter Olympics, recording Did not finish in all but the giant slalom at the 2018 Winter Olympics where he finished 32nd.

== World Cup results ==
=== Season standings ===
Season
Season	Age	Overall	Slalom	Giant slalom
2019	20	105	—	32
2020	21	no World Cup points earned		
2021	22	131	—	46
2022	23	no World Cup points earned		
2023	24	77	47	27
2024	25	56	40	22
2025	26	54	40	19
2026	27	32	38	12

=== Top-ten finishes ===
- 0 podiums, 5 top tens

Season
Season	Date	Location	Discipline	Place
2025	1 March 2025	Kranjska Gora, Slovenia	Giant slalom	10th
2025	15 March 2025	Hafjell, Norway	Giant slalom	9th
2026	28 November 2025	Copper Mountain, United States	Giant slalom	6th
2026	27 January 2026	Schladming, Austria	Giant slalom	6th
2026	24 March 2026	Hafjell, Norway	Giant slalom	6th

== World Championship results ==
Year
Year	Age	Slalom	Giant slalom	Super-G	Downhill	Combined	Team combined	Parallel	Team event
2019	20	DNF1	26	—	—	—	—N/a	—N/a	—
2023	24	DNF1	DNS1	—	—	—	—N/a	9	—
2025	26	19	25	—	—	—N/a	—	—N/a	—

== Olympic results ==
Year
Year	Age	Slalom	Giant slalom	Super-G	Downhill	Combined	Team combined	Team event
2018	19	DNF2	32	—	—	—	—N/a	—
2022	23	DNF1	DNF1	—	—	—	—N/a	—
2026	27	—	DNF1	—	—	—N/a	—	—N/a
