= Ryder Sarchett =

American alpine skier

- Sarchett on screen at the 2026 Winter Olympics

Personal information
- Born: July 28, 2003 (age 23) Ketchum, Idaho, U.S.

Skiing career
- Sport: Alpine skiing

Ryder Sarchett (born July 28, 2003) is an American alpine ski racer who specializes in giant slalom. He is a member of the Stifel U.S. Alpine Ski Team and won the gold medal in giant slalom at the 2024 FIS Alpine Junior World Championships.

== Early life ==
Sarchett was born in Ketchum, Idaho, and grew up in Sun Valley. He began skiing at age two and started ski racing at age ten. He developed through the Sun Valley Ski Education Foundation program.

His parents are Jeff Sarchett, a former professional skier and bike racer, and Dorothy Sarchett; he has a younger sister, Josie.

Sarchett emerged as one of the top American junior technical skiers. He won the U.S. junior national giant slalom title in 2023.

== Junior career ==
Sarchett emerged as one of the top American junior technical skiers. He won the U.S. junior national giant slalom title in 2023. At the 2024 FIS Alpine Junior World Championships in Portes du Soleil, France, Sarchett won the men's giant slalom by 0.06 seconds.

Earlier in his youth career, he won the Whistler Cup giant slalom and helped the United States win the mixed team event.

== Collegiate career ==
Sarchett competed for the University of Colorado Boulder during the 2024 season. He won the giant slalom at the Utah Invitational in his fourth collegiate start and recorded multiple top-10 finishes.

== World Cup career ==
Ryder Sarchett Alpine skiing at the 2026 Winter Olympics – Men's giant slalom

Sarchett scored his first FIS World Cup points in December 2025 with a 25th-place finish in giant slalom at Beaver Creek.

== Olympic qualification ==
In January 2026, Sarchett was named to the United States team for the 2026 Winter Olympics in Milano-Cortina, marking his first Olympic appearance.
