= FIS Alpine World Ski Championships 2023 – Men's alpine combined =

FIS Alpine World Ski Championships 2023 at the Men's alpine combined
- Venue: L'Éclipse
- Location: Courchevel, France
- Dates: 7 February
- Competitors: 54 from 23 nations
- Winning time: 1:53.31

Medalists
gold medal	Alexis Pinturault	France
silver medal	Marco Schwarz	Austria
bronze medal	Raphael Haaser	Austria

The Men's alpine combined competition at the FIS Alpine World Ski Championships 2023 was held at L'Éclipse ski course in Courchevel on 7 February 2023.

== Results ==
The super-G was started at 11:00 and the slalom at 14:30.

Rank	Bib	Name	Country	Super-G	Rank	Slalom	Rank	Total	Diff
1st place, gold medalist(s)	5	Alexis Pinturault	France	1:08.25	1	45.06	3	1:53.31	—
2nd place, silver medalist(s)	12	Marco Schwarz	Austria	1:08.31	2	45.10	4	1:53.41	+0.10
3rd place, bronze medalist(s)	11	Raphael Haaser	Austria	1:08.39	3	45.36	6	1:53.75	+0.44
4	25	River Radamus	United States	1:08.84	5	45.16	5	1:54.00	+0.69
5	19	Atle Lie McGrath	Norway	1:09.50	10	44.53	1	1:54.03	+0.72
6	17	Loïc Meillard	Switzerland	1:09.59	12	44.92	2	1:54.51	+1.20
7	22	Tobias Kastlunger	Italy	1:10.47	23	45.83	7	1:56.30	+2.99
8	36	Albert Ortega	Spain	1:10.18	21	46.63	8	1:56.81	+3.50
9	45	Erik Arvidsson	United States	1:10.65	27	47.09	9	1:57.74	+4.43
10	16	Ryan Cochran-Siegle	United States	1:09.73	16	48.83	12	1:58.56	+5.25
11	13	Barnabás Szőllős	Israel	1:10.54	25	48.05	11	1:58.59	+5.28
12	39	Christian Borgnæs	Denmark	1:11.31	36	47.43	10	1:58.74	+5.43
13	26	Simon Jocher	Germany	1:09.64	13	49.17	14	1:58.81	+5.50
14	9	Marco Pfiffner	Liechtenstein	1:10.93	34	49.16	13	2:00.09	+6.78
15	34	Tvrtko Ljutić	Croatia	1:12.48	40	50.16	17	2:02.64	+9.33
16	37	Elvis Opmanis	Latvia	1:13.23	43	49.58	15	2:02.81	+9.50
17	42	Owen Vinter	Great Britain	1:11.81	38	51.13	18	2:02.94	+9.63
18	27	Juhan Luik	Estonia	1:10.89	33	52.24	19	2:03.13	+9.82
19	46	Benjamin Szőllős	Israel	1:14.95	45	50.10	16	2:05.05	+11.74
20	52	Arnaud Alessandria	Monaco	1:12.13	39	53.37	20	2:05.50	+12.19
21	33	Jaakko Tapanainen	Finland	1:11.00	35	54.54	21	2:05.54	+12.23
22	51	Ed Guigonnet	Great Britain	1:13.07	42	1:02.31	22	2:15.38	+22.07
	14	Justin Murisier	Switzerland	1:09.28	6	Did not finish			
	23	Stefan Babinsky	Austria	1:09.42	8	Did not finish			
	3	Jeffrey Read	Canada	1:09.58	11	Did not finish			
	8	Broderick Thompson	Canada	1:10.05	19	Did not finish			
	1	Jan Zabystřan	Czech Republic	1:10.20	22	Did not finish			
	30	Giovanni Borsotti	Italy	1:10.50	24	Did not finish			
	44	Elian Lehto	Finland	1:10.65	27	Did not finish			
	4	Luke Winters	United States	1:10.73	29	Did not finish			
	6	Johannes Strolz	Austria	1:10.73	29	Did not finish			
	40	Nejc Naraločnik	Slovenia	1:10.86	32	Did not finish			
	29	Rok Ažnoh	Slovenia	1:11.43	37	Did not finish			
	47	Tiziano Gravier	Argentina	1:13.01	41	Did not finish			
	49	Ivan Kovbasnyuk	Ukraine	1:13.72	44	Did not finish			
	20	Vincent Kriechmayr	Austria	1:08.83	4	Did not start			
	15	Aleksander Aamodt Kilde	Norway	1:09.30	7	Did not start			
	18	Stefan Rogentin	Switzerland	1:09.43	9	Did not start			
	10	James Crawford	Canada	1:09.71	14	Did not start			
	53	Andreas Sander	Germany	1:09.72	15	Did not start			
	7	Brodie Seger	Canada	1:09.74	17	Did not start			
	38	Romed Baumann	Germany	1:09.91	18	Did not start			
	2	Nils Allègre	France	1:10.07	20	Did not start			
	48	Blaise Giezendanner	France	1:10.63	26	Did not start			
	28	Martin Čater	Slovenia	1:10.84	31	Did not start			
	32	Adrian Smiseth Sejersted	Norway	Did not finish					
	35	Miha Hrobat	Slovenia	Did not finish					
	41	Sven von Appen	Chile	Did not finish					
	50	Lauris Opmanis	Latvia	Did not finish					
	54	Roy-Alexander Steudle	Great Britain	Did not finish					
	24	Dominik Paris	Italy	Disqualified					
	31	Marco Odermatt	Switzerland	Disqualified					
	43	Mattia Casse	Italy	Disqualified					
	21	Cyprien Sarrazin	France	Did not start					
