= 2026 Alpine Skiing World Cup – Men's slalom =

Alpine ski discipline year standings

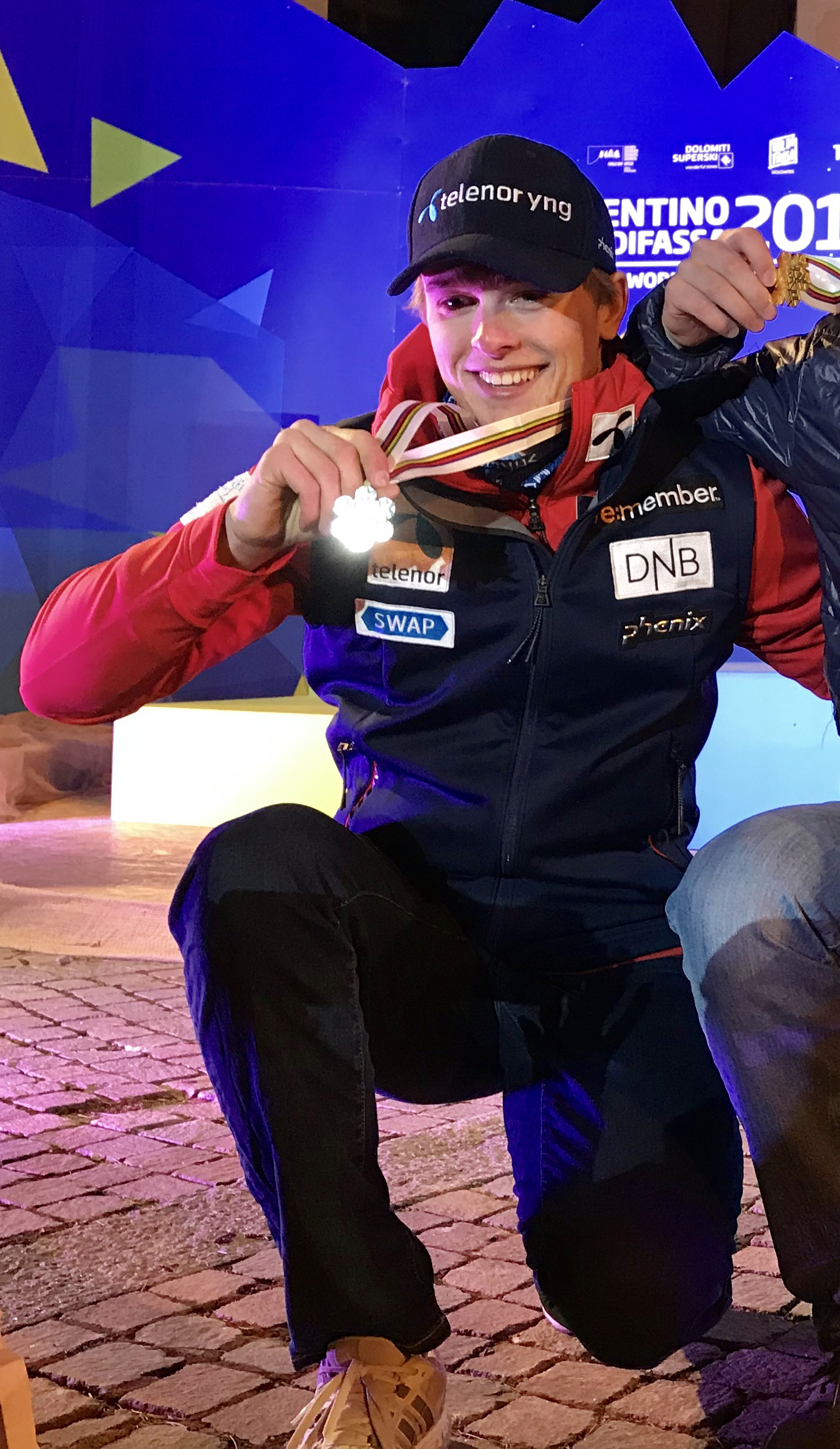
2026 Men's Slalom World Cup: Atle Lie McGrath of Norway, season champion; 2026 Men's World Cup; Overall • Downhill • Super-G; Giant slalom • Slalom
Previous: 2025	Next: 2027

The men's slalom in the 2026 FIS Alpine Skiing World Cup consisted of eleven events, including the discipline final. For the second straight year, the season opened in Levi, Finland (16 November), and the entire season was held in Europe, consistent with the initial schedule released on 12 June 2025. Norway's Atle Lie McGrath triumphed in a battle that went all the way to finals, winning his first discipline championship.

The season was interrupted for the quadrennial 2026 Winter Olympics in three regions in Italy – Milan, the Stelvio Pass, and Cortina d'Ampezzo – during 6–22 February 2026. All of the Alpine skiing events for men took place on the classic Stelvio course at Bormio. The championship in men's slalom, the last men's event in Alpine skiing, was held on Monday, 16 February, and was won by Switzerland's Loïc Meillard (who placed sixth in the discipline for the season) after McGrath, who had a large lead after his first run on the deteriorating course, straddled a gate at the start of the second.

== Season summary ==
In the opening slalom of the season in Levi, 2023 discipline champion Lucas Pinheiro Braathen, who then skied for his native Norway before transferring to his mother's homeland of Brazil in 2025 after a one-year retirement, recorded the first World Cup victory ever for his new country and its one-man team. At the same time, six-time discipline champion Marcel Hirscher, who won all of those championships while skiing for Austria before transferring to the Netherlands after a six-year retirement, announced that his return to the World Cup circuit from his season-ending injury in December 2024 would not take place until January 2026. A week later, the second slalom, in Gurgl, Austria, produced a huge upset as France's Paco Rassat, who had finished a career-best sixth the week before, came from 14th place on his second run to earn his first World Cup victory in his first World Cup podium finish, which gave him the lead in both the discipline and the overall World Cup standings. After a break while the World Cup series moved to North America, slalom resumed at Val d'Isère, France, where Norway's Timon Haugan, who had failed to podium the day before in giant slalom after being in third following the first run, held off Loïc Meillard of Switzerland, the previous day's winner, to become the third different winner in the discipline this season and take over the discipline lead. Finally, in the last World Cup race before Christmas, the aptly-named Clément Noël of France held the slalom lead after the first run, but Norway's Atle Lie McGrath passed him on the second run for the victory, thus denying Noël a holiday-themed win, with McGrath's Norwegian teammate Haugan (fourth) retaining the discipline lead.

Returning from the New Year's break, the men began a series of five slaloms in five weeks with a night slalom in Madonna di Campiglio, Italy, which this time was won by Noël, who came from behind to edge Finland's Eduard Hallberg and thus trail Haugen by only three points for the discipline lead. A week later in Adelboden, Switzerland, France's Rassat claimed his second victory of the season in the slalom, edging out two Norwegians (McGrath and Henrik Kristoffersen) for the win and claiming the lead in the discipline himself by 26 points over Noël, as Haugen failed to finish the first run. In the third race, at Wengen, Switzerland, McGrath repeated his victory there from 2025, beating his good friend (with birthdays only two days apart) and former Norwegian teammate Braathen by almost half a second, which propelled him into a narrow discipline lead, now followed by Braathen, Noël, Rassat, and Haugan, with only 42 points separating the five of them. But the next week, in the slalom at Kitzbühel, Austria, the home country's Manuel Feller came from fourth after the first run to overtake leader Loïc Meillard and save Austrian honor for the weekend; meanwhile, when McGrath failed to finish his first run, Braathen, who finished fourth, took over the discipline lead. Three days later, about a week before the start of the Olympics, a night slalom under the lights at Schlamding turned into an all-Norwegian battle between McGrath and Kristoffersen, with last year's discipline champion Kristoffersen coming from behind on the second run to claim his first victory of the season, while McGrath grabbed a one-point lead over Braathen in the discipline race.

The first run at the Winter Olympics started in a light snowfall, which quickly turned into a blizzard with low visibility, allowing McGrath, the first skier, to build a lead of 0.59 over Meillard, the second skier, who built another 0.35 over the next-best skier, Fabio Gstrein of Austria, with only seven skiers within two seconds of McGrath's lead and 11 of the top 30 and 49 out of 96 total failing to finish the run; however, McGrath straddled a gate and skied out early in the (clear) second run, allowing Meillard to complete his set of Olympic medals at these games with a gold medal (to join his silver from the team combined and his bronze from the giant slalom). Gstrein, who matched Meillard for the best second-run time, won the silver for the first medal for the Austrian men's Alpine skiing team first individual medal of the games, and Kristoffersen, who posted the third-best second-run time, took the bronze for his second career Olympic medal. Back on the World Cup circuit at Kranjska Gora (Slovenia), the situation was reversed: Meillard skied out on the first run, while McGrath barely managed to hold on to his first-run lead for a victory on the melting mountainside (with temperatures in the 50s), edging his teammate Kristoffersen by .01 seconds and his childhood friend Braathen by .04 seconds, thus giving McGrath a 41-point lead over Braathen heading into the finals.

== Finals ==
The World Cup finals in the discipline are scheduled to take place on Wednesday, 25 March 2026 on the Olympialøypa course at Hafjell, near Lillehammer, Norway. Only the top 25 skiers in the World Cup downhill discipline and the winner of the 2026 FIS Junior World Championships in the discipline (Giuliano Fux of Switzerland), plus any skiers who have scored at least 500 points in the World Cup overall classification for the season, will be eligible to compete in the final, and only the top 15 will earn World Cup points. One 500-plus point skier (Marco Schwarz of Austria, discipline champion in 2021) registered, as well as 24 of the 25 qualified competitors (all except the injured Manuel Feller of Austria) and Fux, so the field was set at 26. By the final event at finals, the home country's lack of success during these finals had become a storyline but was decisively ended by the slalom results; first, Norway's Haugan, who had defeated Meillard at Val d'Isère in December, did it again at finals for his second win of the season, giving the fans a home race winner. Then, the overall season-long battle between Norway's McGrath, his close friend (and former Norwegian) Braathen (41 points behind), and France's Noël (77 points behind), which would have been over had McGrath placed no worse then third at finals, instead accelerated when McGrath had a poor second run, creating an opening for Braathen, who failed to take advantage of it by skiing out early in his own second run, while Noël, who then needed a victory to have a shot, instead struggled near the end of his second run, thus allowing McGrath (who ended up eighth) to claim the title, giving the fans a home crystal globe winner as well.

== Standings ==
	Venue	16 Nov 2025; Levi	22 Nov 2025; Gurgl	14 Dec 2025; Val d'Isère	22 Dec 2025; Alta Badia	7 Jan 2026; Madonna di Campiglio	11 Jan 2026; Adelboden	18 Jan 2026; Wengen	25 Jan 2026; Kitzbühel	28 Jan 2026; Schladming	16 Feb 2026; Bormio	8 Mar 2026; Kranjska Gora	25 Mar 2025; Hafjell	
#	Skier	(Finland)	(Austria)	(France)	(Italy)	(Italy)	(Switzerland)	(Switzerland)	(Austria)	(Austria)	(Italy)	(Slovenia)	(Norway)	Total
	(Norway) Atle Lie McGrath	DNF2	60	DNF2	100	32	80	100	DNF1	80	DNF2	100	32	584
2	(France) Clément Noël	80	22	DNF2	80	100	32	29	32	60	DNF2	40	45	520
3	(Brazil) Lucas Pinheiro Braathen	100	26	DNF2	45	50	50	80	50	50	DNF1	60	DNF2	511
4	(Norway) Henrik Kristoffersen	20	22	60	9	16	60	60	26	100	③	80	50	503
5	(Norway) Timon Haugan	45	50	100	50	40	DNF1	45	29	40	④	DNF1	100	499
6	(Switzerland) Loïc Meillard	18	DNF2	80	60	24	DNF2	50	80	DNF2	①	DNF1	80	392
7	(France) Paco Rassat	40	100	DNF1	40	60	100	DNF2	18	DNF2	DNF1	29	0	387
8	(Finland) Eduard Hallberg	60	DNF2	22	32	80	40	DNF1	45	DNF2	DNF1	DNF1	60	339
9	(Switzerland) Tanguy Nef	10	45	DNF1	36	26	32	DNF1	36	29	⑥	26	40	280
10	(Austria) Manuel Feller	24	4	DNF1	24	DNF2	45	24	100	26	DNF1	DNS		247
11	(Germany) Linus Straßer	16	32	DNQ	14	18	DNF2	24	60	DNF1	⑨	45	29	238
12	(Austria) Michael Matt	29	DNQ	16	22	22	13	36	DNQ	DNQ	⑧	50	36	224
13	(Belgium) Armand Marchant	DNQ	80	9	6	40	26	6	40	DNF2	⑤	DNF2	DNF1	207
14	(Austria) Fabio Gstrein	26	15	16	20	DNF1	DNQ	11	24	45	②	22	22	201
15	(France) Victor Muffat-Jeandet	11	36	13	15	11	22	18	13	15	DNS	14	26	194
16	(Norway) Eirik Hystad Solberg	14	8	DNQ	DNQ	45	11	26	6	32	⑦	32	16	190
17	(France) Steven Amiez	32	16	29	12	29	36	DNF1	DNF1	DNQ	⑱	DNQ	20	174
18	(Italy) Alex Vinatzer	DNF1	12	50	26	DNF1	14	20	DNF1	36	DNF1	3	0	161
19	(Italy) Tommaso Sala	DNQ	5	36	18	12	DNQ	5	10	24	DNF1	5	24	139
20	(Switzerland) Daniel Yule	9	24	10	5	DNF2	5	13	22	14	⑮	8	16	126
21	(United Kingdom) Laurie Taylor	50	DNQ	22	13	DNF2	9	DNQ	DNQ	DNQ	DNF1	DNF1	18	112
22	(Bulgaria) Albert Popov	8	29	12	8	DNF2	24	DNF1	9	13	DNF1	3	0	106
23	(Norway) Oscar Andreas Sandvik	DNQ	13	45	29	DNF1	DNQ	8	DNF1	DNF1	DNS	DNF1	0	95
24	(Austria) Dominik Raschner	DNQ	40	DNF1	DNQ	DNF1	18	DNF1	DNF2	DNF2	DNS	36	0	94
25	(Croatia) Samuel Kolega	15	DNF1	14	11	13	10	DNQ	DNQ	18	DNF1	13	0	94
26	(United Kingdom) Dave Ryding	36	6	DNF2	16	DNQ	20	DNF1	11	DNF2	⑰	DNS	NE	89
27	(Austria) Marco Schwarz	12	10	32	DSQ2	DNQ	15	DNS	DNF2	DNQ	⑩	20	0	89
28	(Austria) Joshua Sturm	DNQ	DNQ	DNF1	11	DNF1	DNF1	15	12	22	DNS	18	NE	78
29	(Norway) Hans Grahl-Madsen	DNF1	DNS	40	DNQ	DNF2	DNQ	14	8	DNF1	DNS	10	NE	72
30	(Sweden) Fabian Ax Swartz	DNF1	DNF2	DSQ1	DNF1	DNQ	8	9	14	16	⑭	24	NE	71
31	(Switzerland) Matthias Iten	DNF1	DNS	26	4	DNF1	DNQ	40	DNF1	DNF1	⑪	DNF1	NE	70
32	(Croatia) Filip Zubčić	13	DSQ1	DNQ	DNQ	DNS	DNF1	36	5	DNQ	⑬	6	NE	60
33	(Austria) Johannes Strolz	7	7	8	DSQ1	14	DNF1	3	16	DNF2	DNS	DNF1	NE	55
34	(United States) Benjamin Ritchie	DNF2	DNQ	DNF1	DNF1	DNF2	DSQ1	DNQ	16	20	DNS	13	NE	48
35	(United Kingdom) Billy Major	4	14	7	DNQ	DNQ	12	DNQ	7	DNQ	⑯	DNF1	NE	44
36	(France) Auguste Aulnette	DNS		24	DNQ	DNF1	DNQ	DNS1	DNQ	DNF1	DNS	16	NE	40
37	(Switzerland) Ramon Zenhäusern	DNQ	DNF1	6	DNQ	DNF1	16	DNQ	DNF1	11	DNS	7	NE	40
38	(Belgium) Sam Maes	6	11	11	DNF1	DNF2	DNQ	10	DNQ	DNF1	DNF1	DNQ	NE	38
39	(France) Antoine Azzolin	DNQ	DNF1	DNQ	DNQ	15	DNQ	DNF1	DNF2	DNF1	DNS	15	NE	30
40	(Italy) Tobias Kastlunger	22	DNQ	DNF2	DNQ	DNQ	4	DNQ	DNQ	DNQ	DSQ1	DNQ	NE	26
41	(France) Hugo Desgrippes	DNQ	DNS	22	DNQ	DNQ	DNF1	DNF1	DNQ	DNQ	DNS	DNQ	NE	22
41	(Austria) Simon Rueland	DNQ	22	DNQ	DNF1	DNQ	DNQ	DNQ	DNF1	DNF1	DNS	DNQ	NE	22
43	(Sweden) Kristoffer Jakobsen	DNQ	DNF1	DNF1	DNQ	DNF2	DNF1	DNF1	20	DNF1	DNF1	DNF1	NE	20
43	(Spain) Joaquim Salarich	DNQ	DNQ	DNF1	DNF1	20	DNF1	DNQ	DNF1	DNQ	⑲	DNQ	NE	20
45	(Austria) Adrian Pertl	DNQ	DNQ	DNS1	DNS		DNQ	18	DNF1	DNF2	DNS	DNQ	NE	18
46	(Germany) Sebastian Holzmann	DNQ	DNF1	DNF1	7	DNF1	DNQ	7	DNQ	DNQ	DNS	DNQ	NE	14
47	(United States) Jett Seymour	DNQ	DNQ	DNF1	2	DNF1	DNQ	DNQ	DSQ1	DNQ	DNS	11	NE	13
48	(Croatia) Istok Rodeš	DNQ	DNF1	DNQ	DNQ	DNQ	DNF1	12	DNQ	DNF2	DNF1	DNQ	NE	12
48	(United States) Luke Winters	DNQ	DNF1	DNF1	DNS	DNQ	DNQ	DNS		12	DNS	DNF1	NE	12
50	(Japan) Yohei Koyama	3	9	DNQ	DNF1	DNS							NE	12
50	(Finland) Jesper Pohjolainen	DNQ	DNQ	DNF1	3	DNQ	DNQ	DNF1	DNQ	DNQ	DNF1	9	NE	12
52	(Norway) Theodor Brækken	DNQ	DNQ	DNF1	DNQ	DNF1	DNF1	DNS	DNQ	10	DNS	DNQ	NE	10
52	(Italy) Matteo Canins	DNF1	DNQ	DNQ	DNQ	10	DNQ	DNQ	DNQ	DNF1	DNS	DNQ	NE	10
54	(Switzerland) Marc Rochat	DNQ	DNQ	DNF1	DNQ	DNF2	7	DNF1	DNF1	DNQ	DNS	DNQ	NE	7
55	(Japan) Shiro Aihara	DNS	DNQ	DNF1	DNQ	DNF1	6	DNQ	DNQ	DNQ	⑳	DNQ	NE	6
56	(United States) Cooper Puckett	5	DNS	DNF1	DNQ	DNS		DNF1	DNF1	DNQ	DNS	DNF1	NE	5
57	(Spain) Juan del Campo	DNQ	DNF1	DNQ	DNF1	DNQ	DNF1	DNQ	4	DNF1	DNS	DNF1	NE	4
57	(Italy) Tommaso Saccardi	DNF1	DNS	DNQ	DNF1	DNF1	DNQ	DNF2	DNQ	DNF1	⑫	4	NE	4
57	(Sweden) Gustav Wissting	DNQ	DNS	DNF1	DNS			4	DNQ	DNQ	DNS	DNS	NE	4
60	(Italy) Corrado Barbera	DNQ	DNS			DNQ	3	DNQ	DNF1	DNQ	DNS	DNQ	NE	3
	References													

=== Legend ===
- Winner (100 points)
- 2nd place (80 points)
- 3rd place (60 points)
- DNQ = Did not qualify for run 2
- DNF1 = Did not finish run 1
- DSQ1 = Disqualified run 1
- DNF2 = Did not finish run 2
- DSQ2 = Disqualified run 2
- DNS2 = Did not start run 2
- Did not start (DNS)
- Not eligible for finals (NE)
- Race canceled (x)
- FIS non-World Cup race (Olympics)
- R# = Rescheduled (make-up) race
- Updated at 25 March 2026, after all events.

== See also ==
- 2026 Alpine Skiing World Cup – Men's summary rankings
- 2026 Alpine Skiing World Cup – Men's overall
- 2026 Alpine Skiing World Cup – Men's downhill
- 2026 Alpine Skiing World Cup – Men's super-G
- 2026 Alpine Skiing World Cup – Men's giant slalom
- World Cup scoring system
