= Rettenbach (ski slope) =

Ski course in Austria

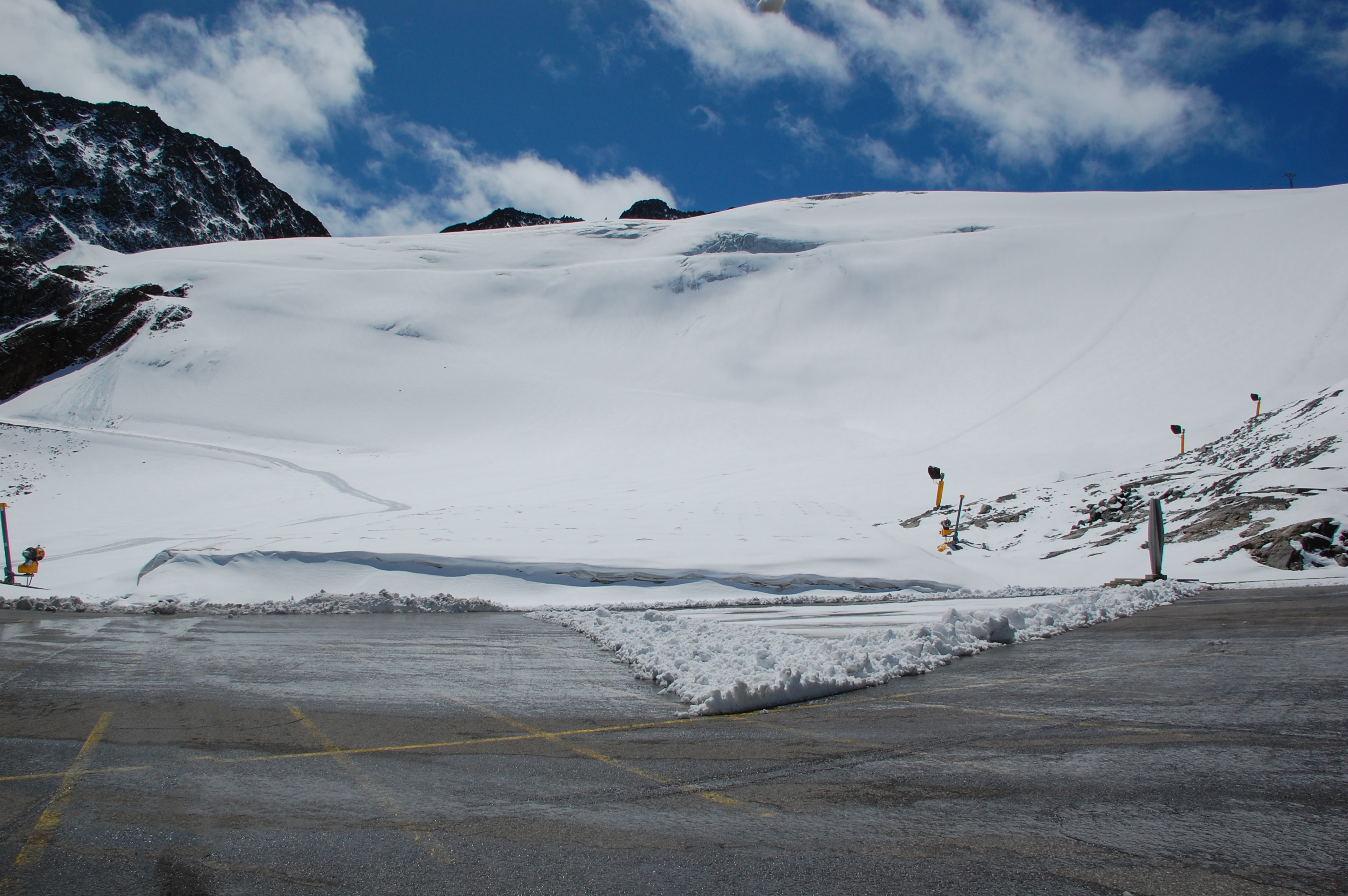
- Interactive map of Rettenbach
- 46°56′35.06″N 10°55′47.11″E
- Location: Sölden, Tyrol, Austria
- Mountain: Wildspitze, Ötztal Alps
- Opened: 1993
- Level: Expert

Giant slalom
- Start: 3,040 m (9,974 ft) (AA)
- Finish: 2,670 m (8,760 ft)
- Vertical drop: 370 m (1,214 ft)
- Max incline: 34.3 degrees (68.2%)
- Most Wins (M): (United States) Ted Ligety (4x)
- Most Wins (W): (Slovenia) Tina Maze (3x)

Rettenbach (Austrian German pronunciation: [ˈrɛtn̩bax]) is a World Cup giant slalom ski course in Austria on Rettenbach glacier above Sölden, Tyrol. Located on Wildspitze mountain in the Ötztal Alps, the race course debuted in 1993.

This course hosted total of 21 World Cup events for men (19th of all-time) and total 24 World Cup events for women (19th of all-time).

== World Cup ==
Since 2000, it is the traditional opener for the World Cup season, with a giant slalom for both genders in late October; previously, it had alternated with Tignes, France, from 1993 on.

The women's race in October 2002 was one of only two triple wins in World Cup history, as Andrine Flemmen (NOR), Nicole Hosp (AUT), and Tina Maze (SLO) shared first place.

The races start at an elevation of 3,040 metres (9,974 ft) above the Adriatic (sea level) and finish at 2,670 m (8,760 ft), yielding a vertical drop of 370 m (1,214 ft).

This slope is widely regarded as the most difficult giant slalom on the women's circuit, with a maximum gradient of 68.2 percent (34.3 degrees) at "Eisfall".

=== Course sections ===
Location in Austria
Location in the Alps
Location in the Europe
- "Rettenbachjoch"
- "Gletschertisch" (Glacier table)
- "Gletscherkante" (Glacier abreuvoir)
- "Eisfall" (Icefall) – the steepest part (68.2%)
- "Gletscherzunge" (Glacier tongue)
- "Elefantentränke" (Elephant potions)

Rettenbach course	Rettenbach course
300x	300x
Finish area	Midsection

=== Men's giant slalom ===
No.	Date	Winner	Second	Third
794	30 October 1993	(France) Franck Piccard	(Sweden) Fredrik Nyberg	(Norway) Kjetil André Aamodt
896	27 October 1996	(Switzerland) Steve Locher	(Switzerland) Michael von Grünigen	(Norway) Kjetil André Aamodt
970	25 October 1998	(Austria) Hermann Maier	(Austria) Stephan Eberharter	(Austria) Heinz Schilchegger
1045	29 October 2000	(Austria) Hermann Maier	(Austria) Stephan Eberharter	(Sweden) Fredrik Nyberg
1078	28 October 2001	(France) Frédéric Covili	(Austria) Stephan Eberharter	(Switzerland) Michael von Grünigen (Sweden) Fredrik Nyberg
1113	27 October 2002	(Austria) Stephan Eberharter	(France) Frédéric Covili	(Switzerland) Michael von Grünigen
1150	26 October 2003	(United States) Bode Miller	(France) Frédéric Covili	(France) Joël Chenal
1189	24 October 2004	(United States) Bode Miller	(Italy) Massimiliano Blardone	(Finland) Kalle Palander
1225	23 October 2005	(Austria) Hermann Maier	(United States) Bode Miller	(Austria) Rainer Schönfelder
	29 October 2006	cancelled		
1298	28 October 2007	(Norway) Aksel Lund Svindal	(United States) Ted Ligety	(Finland) Kalle Palander
1338	26 October 2008	(Switzerland) Daniel Albrecht	(Switzerland) Didier Cuche	(United States) Ted Ligety
1374	25 October 2009	(Switzerland) Didier Cuche	(United States) Ted Ligety	(Switzerland) Carlo Janka
	24 October 2010	cancelled after 1st run due to fog and wind		
1444	23 October 2011	(United States) Ted Ligety	(France) Alexis Pinturault	(Austria) Philipp Schörghofer
1488	28 October 2012	(United States) Ted Ligety	(Italy) Manfred Mölgg	(Austria) Marcel Hirscher
1522	27 October 2013	(United States) Ted Ligety	(France) Alexis Pinturault	(Austria) Marcel Hirscher
1556	26 October 2014	(Austria) Marcel Hirscher	(Germany) Fritz Dopfer	(France) Alexis Pinturault
1593	25 October 2015	(United States) Ted Ligety	(France) Thomas Fanara	(Austria) Marcel Hirscher
1637	23 October 2016	(France) Alexis Pinturault	(Austria) Marcel Hirscher	(Germany) Felix Neureuther
	29 October 2017	cancelled due to excessive high winds		
	28 October 2018	heavy snowfall and excessive high winds; rescheduled to Saalbach-Hinterglemm		
1749	27 October 2019	(France) Alexis Pinturault	(France) Mathieu Faivre	(Slovenia) Žan Kranjec
1783	18 October 2020	(Norway) Lucas Braathen	(Switzerland) Marco Odermatt	(Switzerland) Gino Caviezel
1818	24 October 2021	(Switzerland) Marco Odermatt	(Austria) Roland Leitinger	(Slovenia) Žan Kranjec
1855	23 October 2022	(Switzerland) Marco Odermatt	(Slovenia) Žan Kranjec	(Norway) Henrik Kristoffersen
	29 October 2023	cancelled due to strong winds after 47 skiers had run		
1928	27 October 2024	(Norway) Alexander Steen Olsen	(Norway) Henrik Kristoffersen	(Norway) Atle Lie McGrath
1965	26 October 2025	(Switzerland) Marco Odermatt	(Austria) Marco Schwarz	(Norway) Atle Lie McGrath
2001	25 October 2026	(Brazil) Lucas P. Braathen	(Switzerland) Loic Meillard	(Switzerland) Marco Odermatt

=== Women's giant slalom ===
No.	Date	Winner	Second	Third
736	31 October 1993	(Austria) Anita Wachter	(France) Sophie Lefranc	(France) Carole Merle
836	26 October 1996	(Germany) Katja Seizinger	(Italy) Deborah Compagnoni	(Germany) Hilde Gerg
901	24 October 1998	(Norway) Andrine Flemmen	(Austria) Alexandra Meissnitzer	(Italy) Deborah Compagnoni
977	28 October 2000	(Germany) Martina Ertl	(Norway) Andrine Flemmen	(Sweden) Anja Pärson
1011	27 October 2001	(Austria) Michaela Dorfmeister	(Switzerland) Sonja Nef	(France) Régine Cavagnoud
1045	26 October 2002	(Norway) Andrine Flemmen (Austria) Nicole Hosp (Slovenia) Tina Maze		
1078	25 October 2003	(Germany) Martina Ertl	(Sweden) Anja Pärson	(Spain) M. J. Rienda Contreras
1113	23 October 2004	(Sweden) Anja Pärson	(Finland) Tanja Poutiainen	(Spain) M. J. Rienda Contreras
1146	22 October 2005	(Slovenia) Tina Maze	(Croatia) Janica Kostelić	(Sweden) Anja Pärson
	28 October 2006	cancelled		
1217	27 October 2007	(Italy) Denise Karbon	(United States) Julia Mancuso	(Austria) Kathrin Zettel
1252	25 October 2008	(Austria) Kathrin Zettel	(Finland) Tanja Poutiainen	(Austria) Andrea Fischbacher
1286	24 October 2009	(Finland) Tanja Poutiainen	(Austria) Kathrin Zettel	(Italy) Denise Karbon
1318	23 October 2010	(Germany) Viktoria Rebensburg	(Germany) Kathrin Hölzl	(Italy) Manuela Mölgg
1351	22 October 2011	(United States) Lindsey Vonn	(Germany) Viktoria Rebensburg	(Austria) Elisabeth Görgl
1388	27 October 2012	(Slovenia) Tina Maze	(Austria) Kathrin Zettel	(Austria) Stefanie Köhle
1423	26 October 2013	(Switzerland) Lara Gut	(Austria) Kathrin Zettel	(Germany) Viktoria Rebensburg
1455	25 October 2014	(Austria) Anna Fenninger (United States) Mikaela Shiffrin		(Austria) Eva-Maria Brem
1487	24 October 2015	(Italy) Federica Brignone	(United States) Mikaela Shiffrin	(Liechtenstein) Tina Weirather
1527	22 October 2016	(Switzerland) Lara Gut	(United States) Mikaela Shiffrin	(Italy) Marta Bassino
1564	28 October 2017	(Germany) Viktoria Rebensburg	(France) Tessa Worley	(Italy) Manuela Mölgg
1602	27 October 2018	(France) Tessa Worley	(Italy) Federica Brignone	(United States) Mikaela Shiffrin
1637	26 October 2019	(New Zealand) Alice Robinson	(United States) Mikaela Shiffrin	(France) Tessa Worley
1667	17 October 2020	(Italy) Marta Bassino	(Italy) Federica Brignone	(Slovakia) Petra Vlhová
1698	23 October 2021	(United States) Mikaela Shiffrin	(Switzerland) Lara Gut-Behrami	(Slovakia) Petra Vlhová
	22 October 2022	snowfall and poor visibility		
1773	28 October 2023	(Switzerland) Lara Gut-Behrami	(Italy) Federica Brignone	(Slovakia) Petra Vlhová
1812	26 October 2024	(Italy) Federica Brignone	(New Zealand) Alice Robinson	(Austria) Julia Scheib
1846	25 October 2025	(Austria) Julia Scheib	(United States) Paula Moltzan	(Switzerland) Lara Gut-Behrami
1883	24 October 2026	(United States) Paula Moltzan	(Albania) Lara Colturi	(Germany) Emma Aicher

== Fatal accidents ==
On January 5, 2015, two prospects of the United States Ski Team, Ronnie Berlack and Bryce Astle, were killed by an avalanche they triggered near Rettenbach glacier.

On 17 November 2015, Slovenian ex skier Drago Grubelnik died in a car accident on the seventh curve (elevation 2,455 m (8,054 ft)) on the road descending to Sölden, not far below the World Cup finish area.
