= FIS Alpine World Ski Championships 2027 =

- Host city: Crans-Montana
- Country: Switzerland
- Events: 11
- Opening: 1 February 2027
- Closing: 14 February 2027
- Main venue: Piste Nationale; Mont Lachaux
- Website: https://www.cransmontana2027.ch/en/

The 49th FIS Alpine World Ski Championships are scheduled from 1 to 14 February 2027 in Crans-Montana, Switzerland.

== Medal summary ==
=== Men's events ===
Event	Gold	Silver	Bronze
Downhill			
Super-G			
Giant slalom			
Slalom			
Team combined			

=== Women's events ===
Event	Gold	Silver	Bronze
Downhill			
Super-G			
Giant slalom			
Slalom			
Team combined			

=== Mixed ===
Event	Gold	Silver	Bronze
Team parallel event			
