= Martin Čater =

Slovenian alpine skier (born 1992)

Personal information
- Born: 20 December 1992 (age 33) Celje, Slovenia
- Height: 1.76 m (5 ft 9 in)

Skiing career
- Country: Slovenia
- Sport: Alpine skiing ♂
- Club: SKC - SK Celje
- Disciplines: Downhill, super-G, combined
- World Cup debut: 9 March 2013 (age 20)

Olympics
- Teams: 2 – (2018, 2026)
- Medals: 0

World Championships
- Teams: 6 – (2015–2025)
- Medals: 0

World Cup
- Seasons: 14 – (2013–2026)
- Wins: 1 – (1 DH)
- Podiums: 1 – (1 DH)
- Overall titles: 0 – (52nd in 2018)
- Discipline titles: 0 – (12th in AC, 2017)

Martin Čater (born 20 December 1992) is a Slovenian World Cup alpine ski racer who specializes in the speed disciplines of downhill and super-G. He has represented Slovenia at the 2018 and 2026 Winter Olympics as well as multiple World Championships.

== Career ==
Čater made his World Cup debut on 9 March 2013 at the age of twenty, and earned his first World Cup point in the downhill at Wengen, Switzerland.

On 13 December 2020, Čater secured a surprising World Cup victory with starting number 41 in a downhill race at Val d'Isere, France.

== World Cup results ==
=== Season standings ===
Season
Season	Age	Overall	Slalom	Giant slalom	Super-G	Downhill	Combined
2014	21	145	—	—	—	55	40
2015	22	137	—	—	—	—	30
2016	23	112	—	—	39	—	36
2017	24	67	—	—	26	46	12
2018	25	52	—	—	29	24	13
2019	26	66	—	—	33	27	20
2020	27	75	—	—	36	50	14
2021	28	65	—	—	49	17	—N/a
2022	29	60	—	—	34	23	—N/a
2023	30	80	—	—	41	42	—N/a
2024	31	137	—	—	54	55	—N/a
2025	32	91	—	—	57	29	—N/a
2026	33	81	—	—	—	25	—N/a

=== Top-ten results ===
- 1 win (1 DH)
- 1 podium (1 DH), 10 top tens

Season
Season	Date	Location	Discipline	Place
2017	13 January 2017	Wengen, Switzerland	Combined	9th
2017	26 February 2017	Kvitfjell, Norway	Super-G	6th
2018	29 December 2017	(Italy) Bormio, United States	Combined	7th
2019	19 January 2019	Wengen, Switzerland	Downhill	8th
2020	19 January 2019	Wengen, Switzerland	Combined	6th
2021	13 December 2020	Val d'Isere, France	Downhill	1st
2022	14 January 2022	Wengen, Switzerland	Downhill	10th
2022	15 January 2022	Wengen, Switzerland	Downhill	6th
2025	21 December 2024	Val Gardena, Italy	Downhill	5th
2026	13 March 2026	Courchevel, France	Downhill	8th

== World Championship results ==
Year
Year	Age	Slalom	Giant slalom	Super-G	Downhill	Combined	Team combined	Parallel	Team event
2015	22	—	—	29	25	20	—N/a	—N/a	—
2017	24	—	DNF1	17	—	13	—N/a	—N/a	—
2019	26	—	—	13	—	—	—N/a	—N/a	—
2021	28	—	—	25	—	DNF2	—N/a	—	—
2023	30	—	—	DNF	35	DNS2	—N/a	—	—
2025	32	—	—	DNF	34	—N/a	—	—N/a	12

== Olympic results ==
Year
Year	Age	Slalom	Giant slalom	Super-G	Downhill	Combined	Team combined	Team event
2018	25	—	DNF1	DNF	19	DNF2	—N/a	—
2026	33	—	—	20	16	—N/a	—	—N/a
