= Armand Marchant =

Belgian alpine skier (born 1997)

Personal information
- Born: 14 December 1997 (age 28) Liège, Belgium

Skiing career
- Country: Belgium
- Sport: Alpine skiing
- Club: BE SKI Team
- Disciplines: Slalom, giant slalom
- World Cup debut: 21 December 2014 (age 17)

Olympics
- Teams: 1 – (2022)
- Medals: 0

World Championships
- Teams: 4 – (2015, 2021–2025)
- Medals: 0

World Cup
- Seasons: 10 – (2015–2017, 2020–2026)
- Wins: 0
- Podiums: 1 – (1 SL)
- Overall titles: 0 – (34th in 2026)
- Discipline titles: 0 – (13th in SL, 2026)

Armand Marchant (born 14 December 1997) is a Belgian alpine ski racer. Marchant specializes in the technical events of slalom and giant slalom. Marchant made his World Cup debut on 13 December 2014. He competed at the 2015 World Championships in Beaver Creek, US, in the giant slalom and the slalom.

== Career ==
Marchant made his World Cup debut on 13 December 2014 in the Alta Badia giant slalom, he failed to finish the first run. At the 2015 World Championships in Beaver Creek he finished 41st in the giant slalom and failed to finish the first run of the slalom. On 11 December 2016 he scored his first World Cup points finishing 18th in the Val-d'Isère slalom. A month later, on January 7, 2017, he suffered serious potentially career-ending injuries when he crashed in to a gate during the World Cup giant slalom in Adelboden, Switzerland. It took seven surgeries to repair a shattered left tibial plateau, damaged ligaments and meniscus and two years of rehabilitation to become a skier once again. 947 days after the accident, he made his return to competition during the New Zealand national championships in Coronet Peak, finishing nineteenth.

On 5 January 2020 Marchant finished the 5th place at the Zagreb World Cup slalom event.

In November 2025 Marchant recorded his first ever World Cup podium, finishing second, seven hundredths of a second behind the winner, Frenchman Paco Rassat, in the slalom in Gurgl, Austria. It was his second top-five finish after coming fifth in Zagreb in 2020. It was also a first ever World Cup podium in history for Belgium in Alpine skiing. Having qualified for the 2026 Winter Olympics in Milan and Cortina d'Ampezzo, Italy, he finished fifth in the men's slalom recording the best Belgian result ever in alpine skiing at the Winter Olympics, bettering the 8th place by Belgian skier Patricia du Roy de Blicquy in the women's slalom at the 1964 Winter Olympics in Innsbruck, Austria.

== World Cup results ==
=== Season standings ===
Season
Season	Age	Overall	Slalom	Giant slalom	Super-G	Downhill	Combined	Parallel
2017	19	129	49	—	—	—	—	—N/a
2020	22	87	30	—	—	—	—	—
2021	23	109	37	—	—	—	—N/a	—
2022	24	76	29	—	—	—	—N/a	16
2023	25	99	33	—	—	—	—N/a	—N/a
2024	26	90	30	—	—	—	—N/a	—N/a
2025	27	55	21	—	—	—	—N/a	—N/a
2026	28	34	13	—	—	—	—N/a	—N/a

=== Top-ten finishes ===
- 1 podium, 7 top tens

Season
Season	Date	Location	Discipline	Place
2020	5 January 2020	Zagreb, Croatia	Slalom	5th
2022	12 December 2021	Val d'Isère, France	Slalom	7th
2025	29 January 2025	Schladming, Austria	Slalom	10th
2026	22 November 2025	Gurgl, Austria	Slalom	2nd
2026	7 January 2026	Madonna di Campiglio, Italy	Slalom	6th
2026	11 January 2026	(Switzerland) Adelboden, Austria	Slalom	10th
2026	25 January 2026	Kitzbühel, Austria	Slalom	6th

== World Championship results ==
Year
Year	Age	Slalom	Giant; Slalom	Super G	Downhill	Combined	Team; Combined	Parallel	Team event
2015	17	DNF1	41	—	—	—	—N/a	—N/a	–
2021	23	10	—	DNF	—	15	—N/a	—	15
2023	25	25	—	—	—	—	—N/a	27	12
2025	27	DNS2	—	—	—	—N/a	—	—N/a	—

== Olympic results ==
Year
Year	Age	Slalom	Giant; Slalom	Super G	Downhill	Combined	Team combined	Team event
2022	24	22	—	—	—	—	—N/a	—
2026	28	5	—	—	—	—N/a	—	—N/a
