= Andrej Drukarov =

Lithuanian alpine skier (born 1999)

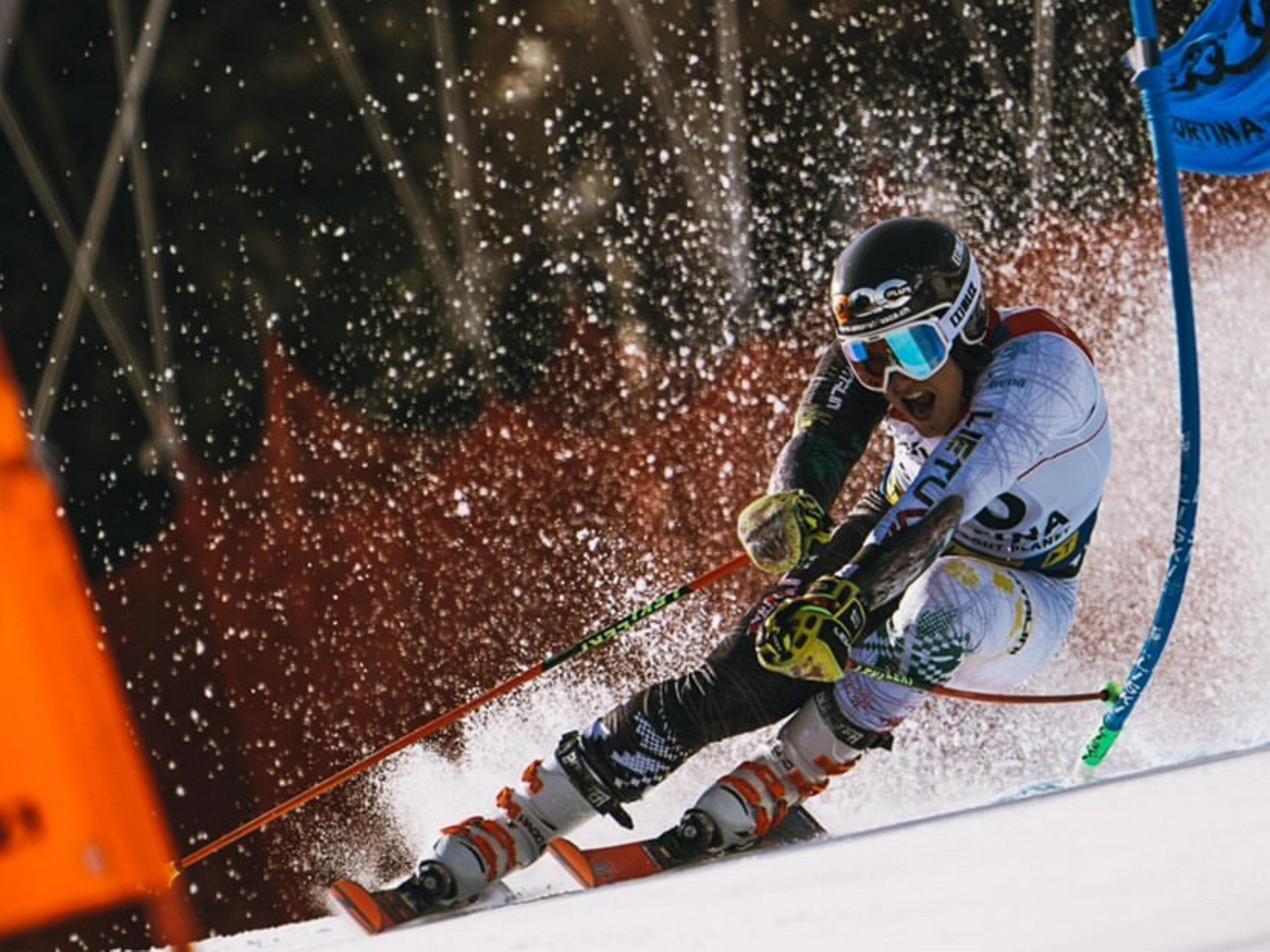
- Andrej Drukarov at 2021 World Championships

Personal information
- Born: 10 May 1999 (age 27) Vilnius, Lithuania

Skiing career
- Country: Lithuania
- Sport: Alpine skiing
- Club: SAS Bern
- Disciplines: Slalom, giant slalom, super-G
- World Cup debut: 13 March 2021 (age 21)

Olympics
- Teams: 3 – (2018, 2022, 2026)
- Medals: 0

World Championships
- Teams: 5 – (2017–2025)
- Medals: 0

World Cup
- Seasons: 6 – (2021–2026)
- Podiums: 0
- Overall titles: 0 – (123rd in 2024)
- Discipline titles: 0 – (45th in GS, 2024)
Medal record
Winter Universiade
Silver medal – second place	2023 Lake Placid	Combined

Andrej Drukarov (Lithuanian: Andrejus Drukarovas; born 10 May 1999) is a Lithuanian alpine skier. He had represented the country at the 2018 and 2022 Winter Olympics. He also served as the flag-bearer during the 2018 Winter Olympics closing ceremony. He won a silver medal in the 2023 Winter World University Games held in Lake Placid. He had also represented Lithuania at three FIS Alpine World Ski Championships.

== Early life ==
Andrej Drukarov was born on 10 May 1999 at the Lithuanian capital of Vilnius. He started competing in the alpine skiing events in the junior category in 2015.

== Career ==
In 2016, he competed at the 2016 Winter Youth Olympics. He represented the nation in all four of the individual events, and recorded finishes in two of those events. In February 2017, he participated in the FIS Alpine World Ski Championships 2017 held at St.Moritz. He finished 43rd amongst the 185 participants in the giant slalom event. He achieved a top three finish in the slalom event at the Junior Championships at Pila in Italy in December 2017. In 2017, he set a Lithuanian national record in slalom by reaching 45.64 FIS points.

In 2018, Drukarov was selected to represent Lithuania in the 2018 Winter Olympic Games. In the Olympics, he finished 41st in the slalom and 59th in giant slalom events. He also served as the flag-bearer during the 2018 Winter Olympics closing ceremony. In 2019, Drukarov broke the national record with 23.24 FIS points in the giant slalom category, which he bettered again in 2021. He represented Lithuania at the FIS Alpine World Ski Championships 2019 in Are, where he competed in three individual events. He won the gold medal in the giant slalom event in the junior championships held in Alleghe in December 2019.

Drukarov won gold medals in the two FIS skiing championships in January 2021 in the giant slalom event. He participated in the FIS Alpine World Ski Championships 2021 in Cortina d'Ampezzo, Italy, where he finished 23rd in the giant slalom event. It is the best ever result for any Lithuanian alpine skier in world championships. In February 2022, he participated in his second consecutive Winter Olympics. However, he did not record a finish in both the events he participated. He won a silver medal in the alpine combined event at the 2023 Winter World University Games held in Lake Placid. He participated in his third FIS Alpine World Ski Championships in 2023 held in France. However, he failed to register a finish in the event.

== World Cup results ==
=== Season standings ===
Season
Season	Age	Overall	Slalom	Giant slalom	Super-G	Downhill
2022	21	153	—	57	—	—
2023	22	No World Cup points earned				
2024	23	123	—	45	—	—

== World Championships results ==
Year
Year	Age	Slalom	Giant slalom	Super-G	Downhill	Combined	Team combined	Parallel	Team event
2017	17	DNFQ1	43	—	—	—	—N/a	—N/a	—
2019	19	47	43	47	—	—	—N/a	—N/a	—
2021	21	DNF1	23	—	—	—	—N/a	—	—
2023	23	—	DNF1	—	—	—	—N/a	—	—
2025	25	—	DNF1	—	—	—N/a	—	—N/a	—

== Olympic results ==
Year
Year	Age	Slalom	Giant slalom	Super-G	Downhill	Combined	Team combined
2018	18	41	59	—	—	—	—N/a
2022	22	DNS1	DNF2	—	—	—	—N/a
2026	26	22	23	31	—	—N/a	—
