= Tormis Laine =

Estonian alpine skier (born 2000)

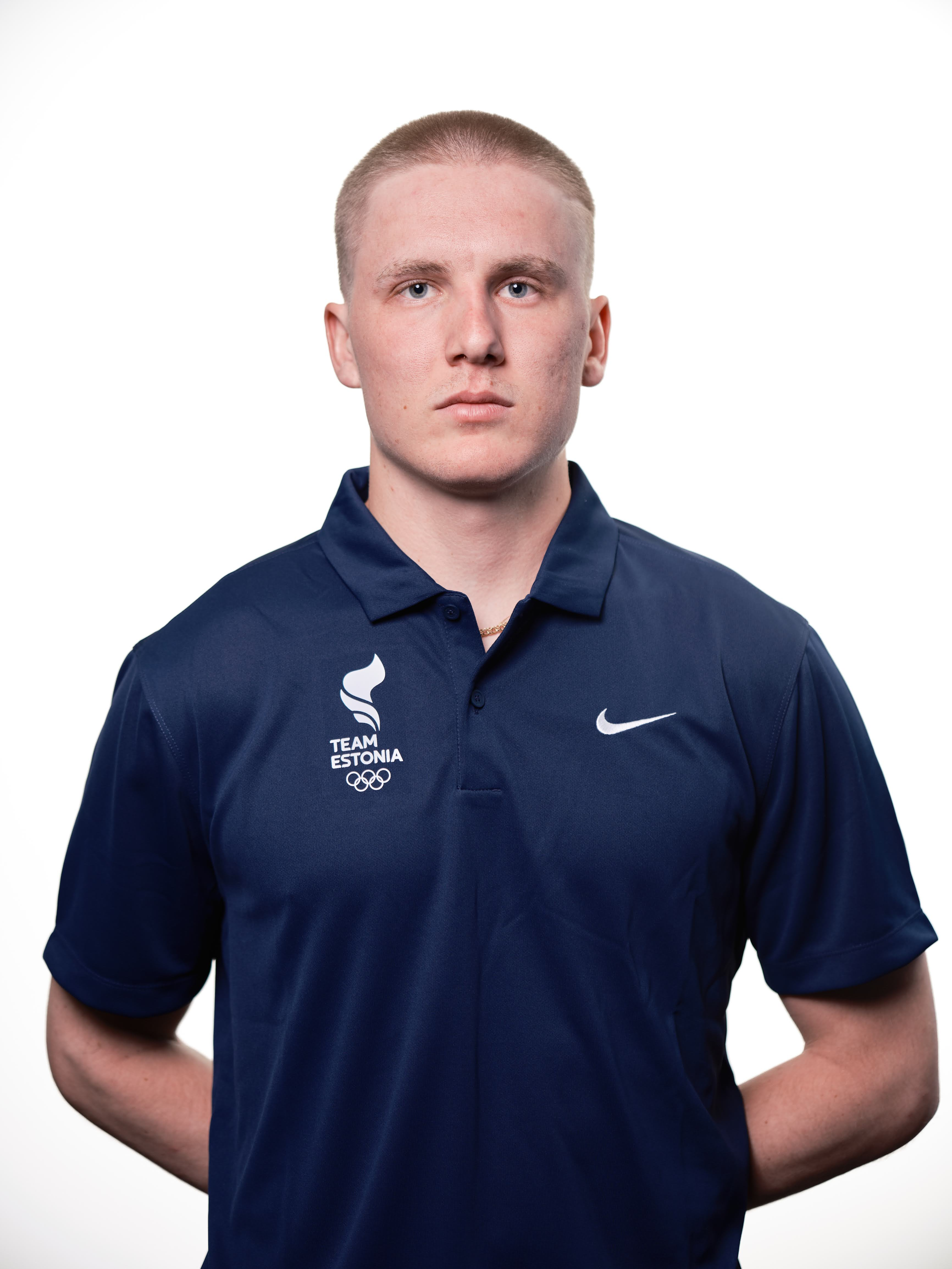
- Tormis Laine (2025)

Personal information
- Born: 6 August 2000 (age 26) Tallinn, Estonia
- Height: 183 cm (6 ft 0 in)
- Weight: 85 kg (187 lb)

Skiing career
- Country: Estonia
- Sport: Alpine skiing
- Club: A. B. G Westliches Mittelgebirge / Global Racing Ski Team
- Coached by: Paul Epstein
- Disciplines: Giant slalom, slalom
- World Cup debut: 27 November 2020 (age 20)

Olympics
- Teams: 3 – (2018, 2022, 2026)
- Medals: 0

World Championships
- Teams: 4 – (2019–2025)
- Medals: 0

World Cup
- Seasons: 5 – (2021–2022, 2024–2026)
- Podiums: 0
- Overall titles: 0 – (78th in 2025)
- Discipline titles: 0 – (29th in GS, 2025)

Tormis Laine (born August 6, 2000, in Tallinn) is an Estonian alpine skier who lives and trains in Tyrol, Austria since 2011.

In 2019, he graduated from the Stams Ski Academy in Austria, and in 2024, from the MCI Management Center Innsbruck with a degree in business administration.

Laine began alpine skiing at the age of 6 in Otepää, under coach Peeter Siim. His coaches have included Margus Silbaum, Oliver Nindl, Toni Trenkwalder, Christoph Praxmarer, Matthias Dietl, and Meelis Minn. Since 2022, he has been part of the Global Racing Ski Team and trains under Paul Epstein. His strength and conditioning coach is Indrek Tustit.

== Career ==
Tormis Laine grew up in Otepää, Estonia. At age 11, he moved with his family to Götzens, Austria to pursue his alpine skiing career. He studied at the Stams Ski Academy.

He made his international competition debut on July 30, 2016, at a FIS slalom race in Tiffindell. His first major international championship experience came in February 2017 at the European Youth Olympic Winter Festival in Erzurum, where he placed 18th in the giant slalom.

During the 2017–2018 season, Laine primarily competed in youth national and FIS races. He also participated for the first time in the Junior World Championships (where he did not finish) and debuted at the PyeongChang Winter Olympics, finishing 40th in the giant slalom.

At the 2019 World Championships in Åre, Laine placed 5th in the qualification but skied out in the first slalom run. At the same year's Junior World Championships in Val di Fassa, he finished 25th in the slalom, marking his first top-30 result at an international championship.

Laine made his World Cup debut on November 27, 2020, in the parallel slalom in Lech/Zürs, finishing 58th in the qualification round and not advancing. In the following years, he primarily competed in Continental Cup series and FIS races. The exceptions were major championships, with his best result being 9th place at the 2021 Junior World Championships in Bansko.

His best result in the European Cup came on February 6, 2024, in Gstaad, where he placed 16th in the slalom. A few weeks later, on February 27, he won his first Continental Cup race — a giant slalom in the North American Cup in Mont Ste Marie. This marked the first-ever Estonian victory at that competition level. In the North American Cup's overall giant slalom standings, he finished 3rd and was 2nd overall, just behind Canadian Simon Fournier.

In the 2024–2025 season, Tormis Laine competed for the first time in a full World Cup season. On November 1, 2024, he earned his first World Cup points with a 27th-place finish in slalom in Levi — the first-ever World Cup points scored by an Estonian alpine skier. Over the season, he collected points in five giant slalom races and four slalom races. In the World Cup overall standings, Laine ranked 29th in giant slalom and 42nd in slalom.

At the World Championships in Saalbach that same season, he achieved Estonia's all-time best World Championship result with Juhan Luige in the newly added Olympic team event, finishing 13th.

== World Cup results ==
=== Season standings ===
Season
Season	Age	Overall	Slalom	Giant slalom	Super-G	Downhill
2025	24	78	42	29	—	—
2026	25	131	—	41	—	—

Standings through 1 February 2026

=== Top twenty finishes ===
- 0 podiums, 2 top twenties

Season
Season	Date	Location	Discipline	Place
2025	14 Dec 2024	Val d'Isere, France	Giant slalom	14th
2025	22 Dec 2024	Alta Badia, Italy	Giant slalom	20th

== World Championship results ==
Year
Year	Age	Slalom	Giant slalom	Super-G	Downhill	Combined	Team combined	Parallel	Team event
2019	18	DNF1	—	—	—	—	—N/a	—N/a	—
2021	20	DNF2	47	—	—	—	—N/a	—	—
2023	22	DNF1	31	—	—	—	—N/a	—	—
2025	24	DNF2	DNF1	—	—	—N/a	13	—N/a	—

== Olympic results ==
Year
Year	Age	Slalom	Giant slalom	Super-G	Downhill	Combined	Team combined	Team event
2018	17	DNF1	40	—	—	—	—N/a	—
2022	21	DNF1	DNF1	—	—	—	—N/a	—
2026	25	—	28	—	—	—N/a	—	—N/a

== Other results ==
=== Estonian National Championships ===
Tormis Laine is the Estonian national champion in giant slalom (2017, 2019) and slalom (2019, 2024). He has been named Estonia's best alpine skier from 2019 to 2025.

=== Junior World Championships ===
- 2018 Davos – no result in giant slalom or slalom
- 2019 Val di Fassa – 25th in slalom; no result in giant slalom
- 2021 Bansko – 9th in slalom, 20th in giant slalom

=== European Cup ===
Three top-30 results

=== North American Cup (2023/24 Season Summary) ===
- 2nd overall
- 3rd in giant slalom standings
- 4th in slalom standings

Six podium finishes, including three wins:

- February 27, 2024 – Mont Ste Marie (Canada), giant slalom
- April 10, 2024 – Panorama (Canada), slalom
- April 11, 2024 – Panorama (Canada), slalom

=== Far East Cup ===
Two top-10 finishes

=== Australia and New Zealand Cup ===
Two top-15 finishes

=== Winter World University Games ===
- 2023 Lake Placid – 9th in slalom, no result in giant slalom

=== European Youth Olympic Winter Festival ===
- 2017 Erzurum – 18th in giant slalom, no result in slalom

== Family ==
Tormis Laine's father, Tiimar Laine, was an Estonian champion in relay running. His sister, Tuule Laine, is a multiple-time Estonian youth champion in alpine skiing.
