= Harry Laidlaw =

Australian alpine skier (born 1996)

Personal information
- Born: 1 March 1996 (age 30) Melbourne, Australia
- Height: 178 cm (5 ft 10 in)
- Weight: 85 kg (187 lb)

Skiing career
- Country: Australia
- Sport: Alpine skiing
- Disciplines: Giant slalom, super-G
- World Cup debut: 9 March 2019 (age 23)

Olympics
- Teams: 2 – (2018, 2026)
- Medals: 0

World Championships
- Teams: 3 – (2017, 2019, 2023)
- Medals: 0

World Cup
- Seasons: 5 – (2019, 2021–2024)

Harry Laidlaw (born 1 March 1996 in Melbourne, Australia) is an alpine skier who competed for Australia at the 2018 Winter Olympics in the alpine skiing events.

== Career ==
Laidlaw competed for Australia at the 2012 Winter Youth Olympics in the alpine skiing and competed in four events with his only completed result being 17th in the slalom event.

He competed in his first World Championship in 2017 with him competing in the Super-G but didn't finish his first run.

== Results ==
=== Olympic Winter Games ===
Year	Age							
Year	Age	Slalom	Giant slalom	Super-G	Downhill	Combined	Team combined	Team event
(South Korea) 2018 Pyeongchang	21	—	DSQ1	—	—	—	—N/a	—
(Italy) 2026 Milano Cortina	29	—	29	—	—	—N/a	—	—N/a

=== World Championships ===
Year	Age							
Year	Age	Slalom	Giant slalom	Super-G	Downhill	Combined	Parallel	Team event
(Switzerland) 2017 St. Moritz	20	—	—	DNF1	—	—	—N/a	—
(Sweden) 2019 Åre	22	—	DNF1	37	—	—	—N/a	—
(France) 2023 Courchevel-Méribel	26	—	25	—	—	—	—	—
