= Christian Borgnæs =

Danish alpine skier (born 1996)

Personal information
- Born: 19 March 1996 (age 30) St Anton, Austria

Skiing career
- Country: Denmark
- Sport: Alpine skiing ♂
- Disciplines: Giant slalom, super-G
- World Cup debut: 8 January 2021 (age 24)

Olympics
- Teams: 1 – (2026)
- Medals: 0

World Championships
- Teams: 2 – (2023–2025)
- Medals: 0

World Cup
- Seasons: 6 – (2021–2026)
- Overall titles: 0 – (106th in 2024)
- Discipline titles: 0 – (38th in GS, 2024)

Christian Borgnæs (born 19 March 1996) is an Austrian born Danish alpine ski racer. He started competing for the Austrian team, and in the summer of 2022 he began competing for Denmark, his father's native country.

== World Cup results ==
=== Season standings ===
Season
Season	Age	Overall	Slalom	Giant slalom	Super-G	Downhill	Combined
2021	25	125	—	43	—	—	—
2022	26	Did not earn a World Cup point					
2023	27	152	—	54	—	—	—
2024	28	106	—	38	—	—	—

=== Results per discipline ===
Discipline	WC starts	WC top 30	WC top 15	WC top 5	WC podium	Best result		
Discipline	WC starts	WC top 30	WC top 15	WC top 5	WC podium	Date	Location	Place
Slalom	4	0	0	0	0	7 January 2024	Adelboden, Switzerland	41st
Giant slalom	43	6	1	0	0	6 January 2024	Adelboden, Switzerland	14th
Super-G	0	0	0	0	0			
Downhill	0	0	0	0	0			
Combined	0	0	0	0	0			
Parallel	0	0	0	0	0			
Total	47	6	1	0	0			

- Standings through 1 February 2026

== World Championship results ==
Year
Year	Age	Slalom	Giant slalom	Super-G	Downhill	Combined	Team combined	Parallel	Team event
2023	27	—	28	39	—	12	—N/a	—	16
2025	29	DNQ	34	—	—	—N/a	—	—N/a	—

== Olympic results ==
Year
Year	Age	Slalom	Giant slalom	Super-G	Downhill	Team combined
2026	30	—	20	—	—	—
