= Nathan Tchibozo =

Beninese alpine skier (born 2004)

Personal information
- National team: Togo (until 2025); Benin (since 2025)
- Born: 15 February 2004 (age 22) Paris, France

Skiing career
- Sport: Alpine skiing
- Club: SC 2 Alpes
- Disciplines: Giant slalom, slalom

Olympics
- Teams: 1 – (2026)
- Medals: 0

World Championships
- Teams: 1 – (2023)
- Medals: 0

Nathan Tchibozo (born 15 February 2004) is a Beninese-French alpine skier.

== Career ==
He began skiing at the age of 3 in France.

He competed for Togo in the giant slalom and slalom events at the FIS Alpine World Ski Championships 2023.

He qualified to represent Benin in the giant slalom and slalom events at the 2026 Winter Olympics, and was the country's flag bearer. This made him the first athlete to represent Benin in a Winter Olympics event.

== Personal life ==
Tchibozo was born in France to a Beninese father and Togolese mother, and holds all three nationalities.

== World Championship results ==
Year
Year	Age	Slalom	Giant slalom	Super-G	Downhill	Combined	Parallel	Team event
2023	19	56	44	—	—	—	—	—

== Olympic results ==
Year
Year	Age	Slalom	Giant slalom	Super-G	Downhill	Team combined
2026	21	—	48	—	—	—
