= Alex Vinatzer =

Italian alpine skier (born 1999)

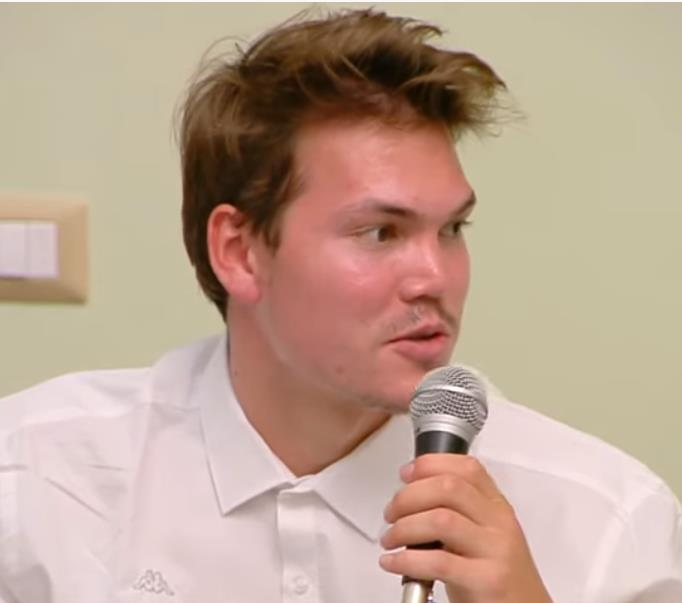
- Vinatzer in 2019 at Palazzo Chigi

Personal information
- Born: 22 September 1999 (age 27) Bolzano, South Tyrol, Italy
- Height: 1.89 m (6 ft 2 in)

Skiing career
- Country: Italy
- Sport: Alpine skiing
- Club: GS Fiamme Gialle
- Disciplines: Slalom, giant slalom
- World Cup debut: 12 November 2017 (age 18)

Olympics
- Teams: 3 − (2018, 2022, 2026)
- Medals: 0

World Championships
- Teams: 4 − (2019− 2025)
- Medals: 3 (1 gold)

World Cup
- Seasons: 9 − (2018–2026)
- Wins: 0
- Podiums: 4 – (3 SL, 1 GS)
- Overall titles: 0 – (18th in 2026)
- Discipline titles: 0 – (9th in GS, 2026)
Medal record
Men's alpine skiing
Representing Italy
World Championships
Gold medal – first place	2025 Saalbach	Team event
Bronze medal – third place	2019 Åre	Team event
Bronze medal – third place	2023 Courchevel	Slalom
Junior World Championships
Gold medal – first place	2019 Fassa	Slalom
Silver medal – second place	2018 Davos	Slalom

Alex Vinatzer (born 22 September 1999) is an Italian World Cup alpine ski racer. He specializes in the technical events of slalom and giant slalom. The Italian national ski team has selected him to compete in three Winter Olympics, and four World Championships.

Born in Bolzano, South Tyrol, Vinatzer made his World Cup debut in November 2017 and his first podium in January 2020 at Zagreb, Croatia. On February 4, 2025, together with Giorgia Collomb, Lara Della Mea and Filippo della Vite, he won the gold medal in the team competition at the World Championships in Saalbach-Hinterglemm.

== World Cup results ==
=== Season standings ===
Season
Season	Age	Overall	Slalom	Giant slalom	Super-G	Downhill	Combined	Parallel
2019	19	94	31	—	—	—	—	—N/a
2020	20	49	11	—	—	—	—	—
2021	21	38	13	—	—	—	—N/a	—
2022	22	35	13	—	—	—	—N/a	13
2023	23	48	18	54	—	—	—N/a	—N/a
2024	24	22	18	16	—	—	—N/a	—N/a
2025	25	32	18	22	—	—	—N/a	—N/a
2026	26	18	18	9	—	—	—N/a	—N/a
2027	27	3	5	7	—	—	—N/a	—N/a

Standings through 15 November 2026

=== Race podiums ===
- 0 wins
- 4 podiums (3 SL, 1 GS); 34 top tens (25 SL, 9 GS)

Season
Season	Date	Location	Discipline	Place
2020	5 January 2020	Zagreb, Croatia	Slalom	3rd
2021	22 December 2020	Madonna di Campiglio, Italy	Slalom	3rd
2025	26 January 2025	Kitzbühel, Austria	Slalom	2nd
2026	7 December 2025	Beaver Creek, United States	Giant slalom	2nd

== World Championship results ==
Year
Year	Age	Slalom	Giant slalom	Super-G	Downhill	Combined	Team combined	Parallel	Team event
2019	19	19	—	—	—	—	—N/a	—N/a	3
2021	21	4	—	—	—	—	—N/a	—	—
2023	23	3	DNF2	—	—	—	—N/a	13	8
2025	25	DNF2	21	—	—	—N/a	—	—N/a	1

== Olympic results ==
Year
Year	Age	Slalom	Giant slalom	Super-G	Downhill	Combined	Team combined	Team event
2018	18	DNF1	—	—	—	—	—N/a	5
2022	22	DNF2	DNF1	—	—	—	—N/a	8
2026	26	DNF1	DNF2	—	—	—N/a	7	—N/a
