= Timon Haugan =

Norwegian alpine skier (born 1996)

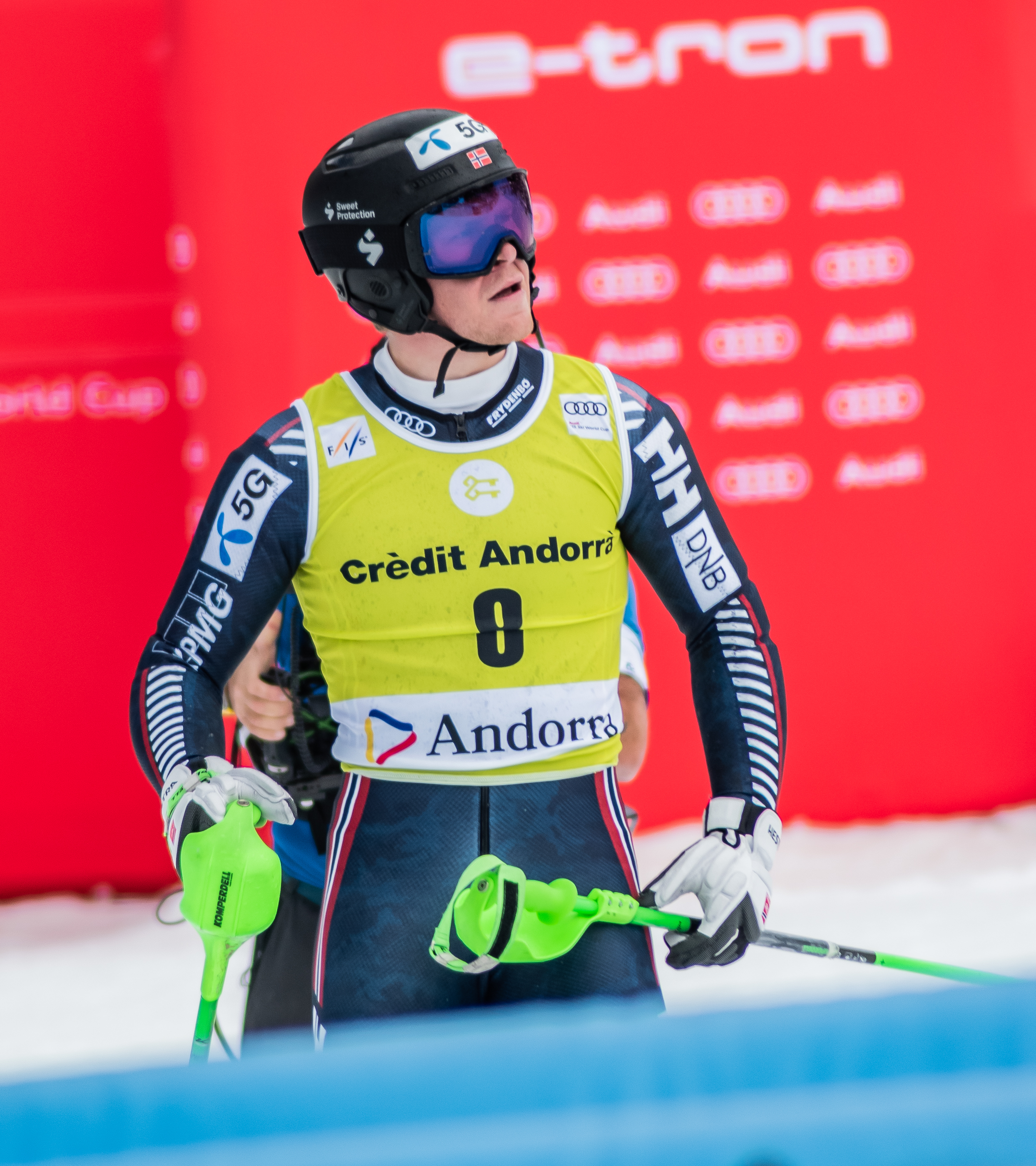
- Haugan in 2023

Personal information
- Born: 27 December 1996 (age 29) Norway
- Height: 1.78 m (5 ft 10 in)

Skiing career
- Country: Norway
- Sport: Alpine skiing
- Club: Oppdal Alpin
- Disciplines: Slalom, Giant slalom
- World Cup debut: 22 December 2017 (age 20)

Olympics
- Teams: 2 – (2022, 2026)
- Medals: 1 (1 bronze)

World Championships
- Teams: 3 – (2021, 2023, 2025)
- Medals: 2 (0 gold)

World Cup
- Seasons: 10 – (2018–2027)
- Wins: 7 – (7 SL)
- Podiums: 13 – (12 SL, 1 GS)
- Overall titles: 0 – (5th in 2025)
- Discipline titles: 0 – (3rd in SL, 2024 & 2025)
Medal record
Men's alpine skiing
Representing Norway
World Cup race podiums
Event	1st	2nd	3rd
Slalom	7	5	0
Giant slalom	0	0	1
Total	7	5	1
Olympic Games
Bronze medal – third place	2022 Beijing	Team event
World Championships
Silver medal – second place	2023 Méribel	Team event
Bronze medal – third place	2023 Méribel	Parallel
Junior World Championships
Silver medal – second place	2017 Åre	Giant slalom

Timon Haugan (born 27 December 1996) is a Norwegian World Cup alpine ski racer who specializes in slalom.

At the 2016 Junior World Championships, Haugan finished eleventh at best, but returned in 2017 and won the silver medal in the giant slalom.

Haugan made his World Cup debut in December 2017 in Italy at Madonna di Campiglio, and also collected his first World Cup points with a 24th-place finish. His first podium (and first top ten) came in February 2020, as the runner-up in the slalom at Chamonix, France.

He represents the sports club Oppdal IL.

== World Cup results ==
=== Season standings ===
Season
Season	Age	Overall	Slalom	Giant slalom	Super-G	Downhill	Combined	Parallel
2018	21	135	46	—	—	—	—	—N/a
2019	22	127	44	—	—	—	—	—N/a
2020	23	71	16	—	—	—	—	42
2021	24	77	29	—	—	—	—N/a	13
2022	25	49	18	51	—	—	—N/a	—
2023	26	35	10	—	—	—	—N/a	—N/a
2024	27	7	3	18	—	—	—N/a	—N/a
2025	28	5	3	11	—	—	—N/a	—N/a
2026	29	6	5	8	—	—	—N/a	—N/a
2027	30	3	1	—	—	—	—N/a	—N/a

Standings through 22 November 2026

=== Race podiums ===
- 7 wins – (7 SL)
- 13 podiums – (12 SL, 1 GS)

Season
Season	Date	Location	Discipline	Place
2020	8 February 2020	Chamonix, France	Slalom	2nd
2023	26 February 2023	Palisades Tahoe, United States	Slalom	2nd
2024	24 January 2024	Schladming, Austria	Slalom	2nd
2024	2 March 2024	Aspen, United States	Giant slalom	3rd
2024	17 March 2024	Saalbach, Austria	Slalom	1st
2025	23 December 2024	Alta Badia, Italy	Slalom	1st
2025	19 January 2025	Wengen, Switzerland	Slalom	2nd
2025	29 January 2025	Schladming, Austria	Slalom	1st
2025	2 March 2025	Kranjska Gora, Slovenia	Slalom	2nd
2025	27 March 2025	Sun Valley, United States	Slalom	1st
2026	14 December 2025	Val d'Isère, France	Slalom	1st
2026	25 March 2026	Hafjell, Norway	Slalom	1st
2027	22 November 2026	Gurgl, Austria	Slalom	1st

== World Championship results ==
Year
Year	Age	Slalom	Giant slalom	Super-G	Downhill	Combined	Team combined	Parallel	Team event
2021	24	—	—	—	—	—	—N/a	14	—
2023	26	17	—	—	—	—	—N/a	3	2
2025	28	5	7	—	—	—N/a	9	—N/a	7

== Olympic results ==
Year
Year	Age	Slalom	Giant slalom	Super-G	Downhill	Team combined
2026	29	4	11	—	—	17
