= Cormac Comerford =

Irish alpine skier (born 1996)

Personal information
- Born: 11 September 1996 (age 29) Glenageary, Dublin

Skiing career
- Country: Ireland
- Sport: Alpine skiing
- Club: Ski Club of Ireland
- Disciplines: Slalom, giant slalom, super-G, downhill

Olympics
- Teams: 1 – (2026)
- Medals: 0

World Championships
- Teams: 5 – (2017–2025)
- Medals: 0

Cormac Comerford (born 11 September 1996) is an Irish alpine ski racer. He competed for Ireland at the 2026 Winter Olympics in all four individual events.

== World Championship results ==
Year
Year	Age	Slalom	Giant slalom	Super-G	Downhill	Combined	Team combined	Parallel	Team event
2017	20	49	65	—	—	—	—N/a	—N/a	—
2019	22	42	DNF1	—	—	—	—N/a	—N/a	—
2021	24	23	DNFQ1	—	—	—	—N/a	—	—
2023	26	46	40	—	—	—	—N/a	—	—
2025	28	DNF1	54	—	—	—N/a	—	—N/a	—

== Olympic results ==
Year
Year	Age	Slalom	Giant slalom	Super-G	Downhill	Team combined
2026	29	31	42	37	34	—
