= Dmytro Shepiuk =

Ukrainian alpine skier (born 2005)

Personal information
- Born: 2 November 2005 (age 20) Yasinia, Zakarpattia Oblast, Ukraine

Skiing career
- Country: Ukraine
- Sport: Alpine skiing
- Disciplines: Downhill, slalom, giant slalom, super-G

Olympics
- Teams: 1 – (2026)
- Medals: 0

World Championships
- Teams: 2 – (2023, 2025)
- Medals: 0

Dmytro Shepiuk (born 2 November 2005 in Zakarpattia Oblast, Ukraine) is a Ukrainian alpine skier. He competed at the 2026 Winter Olympics.

After finishing the super-G race at the 2026 Olympics, Shepiuk displayed a note reading "UKR heroes with us", which he had hidden in his glove. Shepiuk wrote the note in solidarity with skeleton racer Vladyslav Heraskevych, who was disqualified by the IOC for his helmet paying tribute to Ukrainian athletes who died in the Russian invasion of Ukraine.

== Career results ==
=== Winter Olympics ===
Year
Year	Age	Slalom	Giant slalom	Super-G	Downhill	Team combined
2026	20	32	40	36	33	—

=== World Championships ===
Year
Year	Age	Slalom	Giant slalom	Super-G	Downhill	Combined	Team combined	Team event
2023	17	DNF1	66	—	—	—	—N/a	—
2025	19	DSQ1	48	—	—	—N/a	26	—

=== European Cup ===
==== Results per discipline ====
Discipline	EC starts	EC Podium	EC Top 5	EC Top 15	EC Top 30	Best result		
Discipline	EC starts	EC Podium	EC Top 5	EC Top 15	EC Top 30	Date	Location	Place
Slalom	0	0	0	0	0			
Giant slalom	0	0	0	0	0			
Super-G	2	0	0	0	0	26 January 2026	Verbier, Switzerland	66th
Downhill	4	0	0	0	0	12 December 2025	Santa Caterina, Italy	85th
Combined	0	0	0	0	0			
Total	6	0	0	0	0			

- Standings through 12 February 2026.
