= Benin at the 2026 Winter Olympics =

- Flag of Benin
- IOC code: BEN
- NOC: Benin National Olympic and Sports Committee
- Website: cnosben.org

in Milan and Cortina d'Ampezzo, Italy 6 February 2026 – 22 February 2026
- Competitors: 1 (1 man) in 1 sport
- Flag bearer (opening): Nathan Tchibozo
- Flag bearer (closing): Nathan Tchibozo
- Medals: Gold 0 Silver 0 Bronze 0 Total 0

Winter Olympics appearances (overview)
- 2026

Benin was a competitor at the 2026 Winter Olympics in Milan and Cortina d'Ampezzo, Italy, which was held from 6 to 22 February 2026. This was the country's first time participating in the Winter Olympics.

Benin's team consisted of one male athlete. Alpine skier Nathan Tchibozo was the country's flagbearer during the opening ceremony. Tchibozo was also the country's flagbearer during the closing ceremony.

== Competitors ==
The following is the list of number of competitors participating at the Games per sport/discipline.

Sport	Men	Women	Total
Alpine skiing	1	0	1
Total	1	0	1

== Alpine skiing ==
Benin qualified one male alpine skier through the basic quota. Nathan Tchibozo, formerly representing Togo at the 2023 World Ski Championships, will now represent Benin at the Milan-Cortina 2026 Winter Olympics.

Men

Athlete	Event	Run 1		Run 2		Total	
Athlete	Event	Time	Rank	Time	Rank	Time	Rank
Nathan Tchibozo	Giant slalom	1:25.42	52	1:18.23	46	2:43.65	48
Nathan Tchibozo	Slalom	DNF					
