= Barnabás Szőllős =

Israeli alpine skier (born 1998)

Personal information
- Born: 13 December 1998 (age 27) Budapest, Hungary

Skiing career
- Country: Israel
- Sport: Alpine skiing
- Club: Nivelco Racing Team
- Disciplines: Downhill, Super-G, Giant slalom, Slalom, Combined
- World Cup debut: 17 December 2021 (age 23)

Olympics
- Teams: 2 – (2022, 2026)
- Medals: 0

World Championships
- Teams: 4 – (2015, 2021–2025)
- Medals: 0

World Cup
- Seasons: 4 – (2022–2024, 2026)
- Podiums: 0

Barnabás Szőllős (Hebrew: ברנבש סולוש; born 13 December 1998) is a Hungarian-born Israeli alpine ski racer born in Budapest, Hungary.

== Career ==
Szőllős and his sister, alpine ski racer Noa Szőllős, were selected by the Olympic Committee of Israel to compete for Israel. At the 2022 Winter Olympics, he finished 6th in the combined downhill, equaling the best-ever finish by Israel at the Winter Olympics. He was the only male alpine ski racer to finish all individual disciplines - and finishing all of them inside the top 30 - at the 2022 Winter Olympics.

His older brother is fellow alpine ski racer Benjamin Szőllős. His younger sister, Noa Szőllős, also competed for Israel at the 2022 Winter Olympics in Alpine skiing events.

== World Championship results ==
Year
Year	Age	Slalom	Giant slalom	Super-G	Downhill	Combined	Team combined
2015	16	—	84	—	—	—	—N/a
2021	22	—	25	29	30	13	—N/a
2023	24	—	56	34	37	11	—N/a
2025	26	—	BDNF2	DNF	37	—N/a	20

== Olympic results ==
Year
Year	Age	Slalom	Giant slalom	Super-G	Downhill	Combined	Team combined
2022	23	23	22	30	30	6	—N/a
2026	27	26	41	33	30	—N/a	—
