= Alpine skiing at the 2026 Winter Olympics – Men's giant slalom =

Men's giant slalom at the XXV Olympic Winter Games
- Alpine skiing
- Venue: Stelvio, Bormio
- Date: 14 February 2026
- Competitors: 81 from 62 nations

Medalists
1st place, gold medalist(s)		Lucas Pinheiro Braathen	Brazil
2nd place, silver medalist(s)		Marco Odermatt	Switzerland
3rd place, bronze medalist(s)		Loïc Meillard	Switzerland

Men's giant slalom
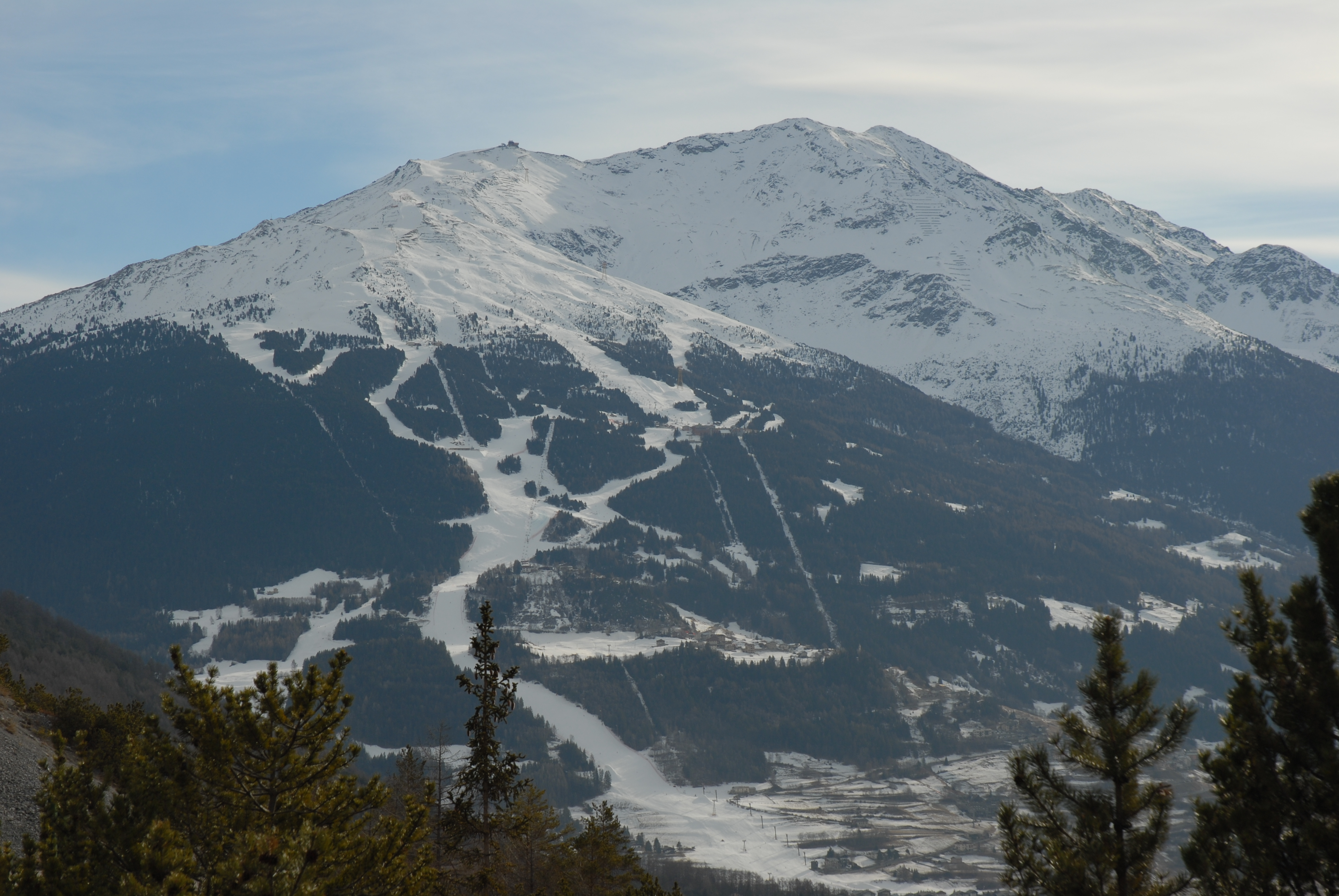
- Location: Stelvio Ski Centre
- Vertical: 390 m (1,280 ft)
- Top elevation: 1,619 m (5,312 ft) AMSL
- Base elevation: 1,229 m (4,032 ft)
- Longest run: 1.428 km (0.89 mi)

The men's giant slalom competition of the 2026 Winter Olympics was held on Saturday, 14 February, at Stelvio Ski Centre in Bormio. Lucas Pinheiro Braathen of Brazil won the event. This was the first medal for Brazil at the Winter Olympics, and also the first medal for a tropical nation and South America. Marco Odermatt of Switzerland, the defending champion, won the silver medal and teammate Loïc Meillard took bronze.

== Background ==
The 2022 champion, Marco Odermatt, qualified for the event, as did the silver medalist, Žan Kranjec. Bronze medalist Mathieu Faivre had retired from competitions. Prior to the Olympics on the World Cup circuit, Odermatt led in the overall and giant slalom standings, having won three of seven events. Raphael Haaser was the reigning world champion.

== Results ==
The race was started at 10:00 (first run) and 13:30 (second run) local time (UTC+1), both under overcast skies. The first run's snow condition was icy; the air temperature was 0.4 °C (33 °F) at the starting gate and 0.7 °C (33 °F) at the finish area. The second run's snow condition was wet; the air temperature was 1.5 °C (35 °F) at the starting gate and 4.5 °C (40 °F) at the finish area.

Rank	Bib	Name	Nation	Run 1	Rank	Run 2	Rank	Total	Behind
1st place, gold medalist(s)	1	Lucas Pinheiro Braathen	Brazil	1:13.92	1	1:11.08	11	2:25.00	–
2nd place, silver medalist(s)	5	Marco Odermatt	Switzerland	1:14.87	2	1:10.71	6	2:25.58	+0.58
3rd place, bronze medalist(s)	6	Loïc Meillard	Switzerland	1:15.49	3	1:10.68	5	2:26.17	+1.17
4	9	Thomas Tumler	Switzerland	1:15.81	4	1:10.64	3	2:26.45	+1.45
5	2	Atle Lie McGrath	Norway	1:15.93	8	1:10.89	9	2:26.82	+1.82
6	10	Léo Anguenot	France	1:15.83	5	1:11.16	12	2:26.99	+1.99
7	3	Henrik Kristoffersen	Norway	1:15.85	6	1:11.19	14	2:27.04	+2.04
8	7	Stefan Brennsteiner	Austria	1:15.92	7	1:11.31	18	2:27.23	+2.23
9	4	Marco Schwarz	Austria	1:16.66	18	1:10.62	2	2:27.28	+2.28
10	23	Joan Verdú	Andorra	1:16.69	19	1:10.60	1	2:27.29	+2.29
11	11	Timon Haugan	Norway	1:16.49	14	1:10.81	8	2:27.30	+2.30
12	8	Žan Kranjec	Slovenia	1:16.03	9	1:11.41	22	2:27.44	+2.44
13	24	Alexander Schmid	Germany	1:16.84	20	1:10.64	3	2:27.48	+2.48
14	13	Filip Zubčić	Croatia	1:16.59	16	1:10.91	10	2:27.50	+2.50
15	22	Anton Grammel	Germany	1:16.56	15	1:11.16	12	2:27.72	+2.72
16	19	Patrick Feurstein	Austria	1:16.46	13	1:11.38	20	2:27.84	+2.84
17	15	River Radamus	United States	1:16.38	12	1:11.58	24	2:27.96	+2.96
18	14	Luca Aerni	Switzerland	1:16.89	21	1:11.30	17	2:28.19	+3.19
19	16	Raphael Haaser	Austria	1:17.46	24	1:10.75	7	2:28.21	+3.21
20	32	Christian Borgnæs	Denmark	1:17.10	22	1:11.25	15	2:28.35	+3.35
21	29	Andreas Žampa	Slovakia	1:16.64	17	1:11.80	25	2:28.44	+3.44
22	27	Fabian Ax Swartz	Sweden	1:17.42	23	1:11.34	19	2:28.76	+3.76
23	35	Andrej Drukarov	Lithuania	1:17.56	25	1:11.47	23	2:29.03	+4.03
24	31	Giovanni Franzoni	Italy	1:17.86	26	1:11.27	16	2:29.13	+4.13
25	26	Ryder Sarchett	United States	1:18.72	29	1:11.39	21	2:30.11	+5.11
26	34	Tiziano Gravier	Argentina	1:18.45	27	1:11.85	26	2:30.30	+5.30
27	38	Jesper Pohjolainen	Finland	1:18.77	30	1:12.10	27	2:30.87	+5.87
28	28	Tormis Laine	Estonia	1:18.84	32	1:12.73	28	2:31.57	+6.57
29	39	Harry Laidlaw	Australia	1:18.52	28	1:13.38	29	2:31.90	+6.90
30	42	Tomas Holscher	Chile	1:19.92	34	1:13.57	30	2:33.49	+8.49
31	47	Giovanni Ongaro	Brazil	1:19.95	35	1:14.20	31	2:34.15	+9.15
32	40	Bálint Úry	Hungary	1:19.60	33	1:14.70	33	2:34.30	+9.30
33	36	Jung Dong-hyun	South Korea	1:20.84	37	1:14.57	32	2:35.41	+10.41
34	41	Denni Xhepa	Albania	1:20.57	36	1:15.34	34	2:35.91	+10.91
35	44	Marek Müller	Czech Republic	1:21.90	39	1:15.87	36	2:37.77	+12.77
36	49	Kalin Zlatkov	Bulgaria	1:22.32	40	1:16.76	38	2:39.08	+14.08
37	52	Marko Šljivić	Bosnia and Herzegovina	1:22.76	41	1:17.45	41	2:40.21	+15.21
38	57	Emeric Guerillot	Portugal	1:22.87	42	1:16.58	37	2:39.45	+14.45
39	48	Nicolás Pirozzi	Uruguay	1:22.99	43	1:15.66	35	2:38.65	+13.65
40	48	Dmytro Shepiuk	Ukraine	1:22.99	43	1:17.37	39	2:40.36	+15.36
41	43	Barnabás Szőllős	Israel	1:23.32	45	1:18.13	44	2:41.45	+16.45
42	58	Cormac Comerford	Ireland	1:24.32	46	1:17.43	40	2:41.75	+16.75
43	51	Alexandru Ștefan Ștefănescu	Romania	1:25.17	51	1:17.53	42	2:42.70	+17.70
44	50	Richardson Viano	Haiti	1:24.55	47	1:18.28	47	2:42.83	+17.83
45	60	Elvis Opmanis	Latvia	1:24.90	48	1:18.20	45	2:43.10	+18.10
46	59	Matthieu Osch	Luxembourg	1:25.06	50	1:18.12	43	2:43.18	+18.18
47	54	Aleksa Tomović	Serbia	1:24.97	49	1:18.64	48	2:43.61	+18.61
48	61	Nathan Tchibozo	Benin	1:25.42	52	1:18.23	46	2:43.65	+18.65
49	56	Thomas Kaan Önol Lang	Turkey	1:25.67	53	1:18.83	49	2:44.50	+19.50
50	55	Medet Nazarov	Uzbekistan	1:25.75	54	1:21.14	58	2:46.89	+21.89
51	68	Rostislav Khokhlov	Kazakhstan	1:26.38	55	1:20.98	56	2:47.36	+22.36
52	66	Nikhil Alleyne	Trinidad and Tobago	1:27.79	59	1:19.93	50	2:47.72	+22.72
53	64	Lasse Gaxiola	Mexico	1:27.23	56	1:20.85	52	2:48.08	+23.08
54	67	Francis Ceccarelli	Philippines	1:27.36	57	1:20.87	53	2:48.23	+23.23
55	65	Viktor Petkov	North Macedonia	1:27.36	58	1:21.01	57	2:48.37	+23.37
56	69	Luka Buchukuri	Georgia	1:28.21	61	1:20.57	51	2:48.78	+23.78
57	76	Mathieu Gravier	Madagascar	1:27.86	60	1:20.97	55	2:48.83	+23.83
58	62	Liu Xiaochen	China	1:29.45	66	1:20.96	54	2:50.41	+25.41
59	80	Harutyun Harutyunyan	Armenia	1:28.91	63	1:21.67	59	2:50.58	+25.58
60	79	Fabian Wiest	Thailand	1:28.85	62	1:21.96	60	2:50.81	+25.81
61	63	Mohammad Kiyadarbandsari	Iran	1:29.14	64	1:22.03	61	2:51.17	+26.17
62	75	Timur Shakirov	Kyrgyzstan	1:29.52	67	1:22.50	63	2:52.02	+27.02
63	71	Thomas Weir	South Africa	1:29.55	68	1:22.48	62	2:52.03	+27.03
64	78	Yianno Kouyoumdjian	Cyprus	1:29.14	64	1:22.97	66	2:52.11	+27.11
65	72	Rafael Mini	San Marino	1:29.88	70	1:22.68	64	2:52.56	+27.56
66	81	Issa Laborde Dit Pere	Kenya	1:29.57	69	1:23.21	67	2:52.78	+27.78
67	70	Fayik Abdi	Saudi Arabia	1:30.52	71	1:22.89	65	2:53.41	+28.41
68	74	Hau Tsuen Adrian Yung	Hong Kong	1:31.22	72	1:24.99	69	2:56.21	+31.21
69	77	Shannon-Ogbnai Abeda	Eritrea	1:33.00	73	1:23.30	68	2:56.30	+31.30
	12	Alex Vinatzer	Italy	1:16.31	11	DNF	—N/a		
	18	Fabian Gratz	Germany	1:16.20	10	DNF	—N/a		
	20	Alban Elezi Cannaferina	France	1:18.79	31	DNF	—N/a		
	45	Jón Erik Sigurðsson	Iceland	1:21.61	38	DNF	—N/a		
	17	Sam Maes	Belgium	DNF	—N/a				
	21	Luca De Aliprandini	Italy	DNF	—N/a				
	25	Eirik Hystad Solberg	Norway	DNF	—N/a				
	30	Tobias Kastlunger	Italy	DNF	—N/a				
	33	Eduard Hallberg	Finland	DNF	—N/a				
	37	Pietro Tranchina	Morocco	DNF	—N/a				
	46	Kyle Negomir	United States	DNF	—N/a				
	73	Faiz Basha	Singapore	DNF	—N/a				
