= FIS Alpine World Ski Championships 2025 – Men's slalom =

Men's slalom at the FIS Alpine World Ski Championships 2025
- Venue: Skicircus Saalbach-Hinterglemm/Leogang
- Location: Saalbach-Hinterglemm, Austria
- Dates: 15 February (qualification); 16 February
- Competitors: 188 from 69 nations
- Winning time: 1:54.02

Medalists
gold medal	Loïc Meillard	Switzerland
silver medal	Atle Lie McGrath	Norway
bronze medal	Linus Straßer	Germany

Men's Slalom
- Location: Ulli Maier; Saalbach, Austria
- Vertical: 218 m (715 ft)
- Top elevation: 1,279 m (4,196 ft)
- Base elevation: 1,061 m (3,481 ft)

The Men's slalom competition at the FIS Alpine World Ski Championships 2025 was the concluding event, held on Sunday, 16 February 2025. A qualification was held on 15 February.

== Results ==
The first run was started at 09:45 and the second run at 13:15.

Rank	Bib	Name	Nation	Run 1	Rank	Run 2	Rank	Total	Diff
1st place, gold medalist(s)	7	Loic Meillard	Switzerland	59.42	2	54.60	10	1:54.02	—
2nd place, silver medalist(s)	5	Atle Lie McGrath	Norway	59.87	3	54.41	5	1:54.28	+0.26
3rd place, bronze medalist(s)	6	Linus Strasser	Germany	1:00.00	5	54.54	7	1:54.54	+0.52
4	4	Manuel Feller	Austria	1:00.51	6	54.30	3	1:54.81	+0.79
5	3	Timon Haugan	Norway	59.93	4	54.98	13	1:54.91	+0.89
6	10	Dave Ryding	United Kingdom	1:01.09	13	54.44	6	1:55.53	+1.51
7	8	Steven Amiez	France	1:00.72	7	54.86	12	1:55.58	+1.56
8	19	Dominik Raschner	Austria	1:01.73	23	53.90	1	1:55.63	+1.61
9	17	Tanguy Nef	Switzerland	1:00.72	7	54.99	14	1:55.71	+1.69
10	15	Samuel Kolega	Croatia	1:01.57	20	54.27	2	1:55.84	+1.82
11	14	Fabio Gstrein	Austria	1:00.73	9	55.18	19	1:55.91	+1.89
12	30	Eduard Hallberg	Finland	1:01.34	17	54.59	8	1:55.93	+1.91
13	12	Lucas Pinheiro Braathen	Brazil	1:00.74	10	55.36	21	1:56.10	+2.08
13	2	Henrik Kristoffersen	Norway	1:00.82	11	55.28	20	1:56.10	+2.08
15	33	Billy Major	United Kingdom	1:01.79	25	54.35	4	1:56.14	+2.12
16	23	Marc Rochat	Switzerland	1:01.64	21	54.59	8	1:56.23	+2.21
17	26	Victor Muffat-Jeandet	France	1:01.64	21	54.63	11	1:56.27	+2.25
18	9	Albert Popov	Bulgaria	1:01.45	18	55.07	18	1:56.52	+2.50
19	36	Sam Maes	Belgium	1:01.27	16	55.37	22	1:56.64	+2.62
20	29	Stefano Gross	Italy	1:01.11	14	55.64	24	1:56.75	+2.73
21	31	Jett Seymour	United States	1:02.29	26	55.00	15	1:57.29	+3.27
22	45	Matej Vidović	Croatia	1:02.57	30	55.01	16	1:57.58	+3.56
23	42	Juan del Campo	Spain	1:02.57	30	55.02	17	1:57.59	+3.57
24	46	William Hansson	Sweden	1:02.65	33	55.43	23	1:58.08	+4.06
24	37	Erik Read	Canada	1:02.42	27	55.66	25	1:58.08	+4.06
26	40	Gustav Wissting	Sweden	1:03.25	34	56.33	26	1:59.58	+5.56
27	43	Yohei Koyama	Japan	1:04.24	39	56.42	27	2:00.66	+6.64
28	48	Michal Jasiczek	Poland	1:03.56	36	57.34	29	2:00.90	+6.88
29	52	Aingeru Garay	Spain	1:04.17	38	57.26	28	2:01.43	+7.41
30	47	Richard Leitgeb	Hungary	1:03.80	37	57.85	31	2:01.65	+7.63
31	60	Bálint Úry	Hungary	1:04.72	42	57.74	30	2:02.46	+8.44
32	63	Alex Rius Gimenez	Andorra	1:04.88	43	57.87	32	2:02.75	+8.73
33	59	Adam Nováček	Slovakia	1:05.15	45	58.39	33	2:03.54	+9.52
34	57	Gleb Mosesov	Armenia	1:04.69	41	59.38	35	2:04.07	+10.05
35	67	Casper Dyrbye	Denmark	1:05.42	46	59.49	36	2:04.91	+10.89
36	55	Tomas Barata	Spain	1:07.55	55	59.04	34	2:06.59	+12.57
37	65	Tamás Trunk	Hungary	1:06.93	49	59.91	37	2:06.84	+12.82
38	61	Hugh McAdam	Australia	1:05.12	44	1:01.82	40	2:06.94	+12.92
39	84	Richardson Viano	Haiti	1:06.79	48	1:00.82	38	2:07.61	+13.59
40	85	Alexandru Ștefan Ștefănescu	Romania	1:08.03	53	1:01.24	39	2:09.27	+15.25
41	80	Matthieu Osch	Luxembourg	1:07.79	52	1:02.91	41	2:10.70	+15.25
42	88	Medet Nazarov	Uzbekistan	1:10.53	54	1:03.39	42	2:13.92	+15.25
43	100	Troy Samuel Chang	Chinese Taipei	1:14.86	55	1:08.20	43	2:23.06	+15.25
44	97	Arif Mohd Khan	India	1:20.38	57	1:18.39	44	2:38.77	+15.25
	1	Clément Noël	France	59.23	1	Did not finish			
	13	Daniel Yule	Switzerland	1:01.00	12	Did not finish			
	18	Alex Vinatzer	Italy	1:01.77	24	Did not finish			
	20	Filip Zubčić	Croatia	1:01.12	15	Did not finish			
	27	Tobias Kastlunger	Italy	1:02.45	29	Did not finish			
	28	Laurie Taylor	United Kingdom	1:01.47	19	Did not finish			
	34	Tormis Laine	Estonia	1:02.44	28	Did not finish			
	54	Luke Winters	United States	1:03.32	35	Did not finish			
	69	Alec Jackson	New Zealand	1:06.47	47	Did not finish			
	74	Jurre Jeurissen	Netherlands	1:07.03	50	Did not finish			
	98	Mathieu Neumuller	Madagascar	1:15.78	56	Did not finish			
	25	Armand Marchant	Belgium	1:02.61	32	Did not start			
	50	Takayuki Koyama	Japan	1:04.24	39	Did not start			
	11	Kristoffer Jakobsen	Sweden	Did not finish					
	16	Alexander Steen Olsen	Norway	Did not finish					
	21	Marco Schwarz	Austria	Did not finish					
	22	Paco Rassat	France	Did not finish					
	24	Benjamin Ritchie	United States	Did not finish					
	32	Istok Rodeš	Croatia	Did not finish					
	35	Fabian Ax Swartz	Sweden	Did not finish					
	38	River Radamus	United States	Did not finish					
	41	Sebastian Foss-Solevåg	Norway	Did not finish					
	44	Jesper Pohjolainen	Finland	Did not finish					
	49	Kalin Zlatkov	Bulgaria	Did not finish					
	51	Piotr Habdas	Poland	Did not finish					
	53	Louis Muhlen-Schulte	Australia	Did not finish					
	56	Hong Dong-kwan	South Korea	Did not finish					
	58	Denni Xhepa	Albania	Did not finish					
	62	Miha Oserban	Slovenia	Did not finish					
	64	Ioannis Antoniou	Greece	Did not finish					
	66	Barnabás Szőllős	Israel	Did not finish					
	68	Nicolas Quintero	Argentina	Did not finish					
	70	Sturla Snær Snorrason	Iceland	Did not finish					
	71	Marek Muller	Czech Republic	Did not finish					
	72	Benjamin Szőllős	Israel	Did not finish					
	73	Jón Erik Sigurðsson	Iceland	Did not finish					
	75	Milan Grebenar	Argentina	Did not finish					
	76	Henry Heaydon	Australia	Did not finish					
	77	Nicolas Hotermans	Belgium	Did not finish					
	78	Marko Šljivić	Bosnia and Herzegovina	Did not finish					
	79	Cormac Comerford	Ireland	Did not finish					
	81	Aleksa Tomović	Serbia	Did not finish					
	82	Manuel Horwitz	Chile	Did not finish					
	86	Mirko Lazareski	North Macedonia	Did not finish					
	87	Gustavs Harijs Ābele	Latvia	Did not finish					
	89	Morteza Jafari	Iran	Did not finish					
	90	Luca Poberai	Lithuania	Did not finish					
	91	Branislav Peković	Montenegro	Did not finish					
	92	Timur Shakirov	Kyrgyzstan	Did not finish					
	93	Faiz Basha	Singapore	Did not finish					
	94	Yianno Kouyoumdjan	Cyprus	Did not finish					
	95	Drin Kokaj	Kosovo	Did not finish					
	96	Luka Buchukuri	Georgia	Did not finish					
	97	Alessandro Cantele Fink	Mexico	Did not finish					
	39	Joaquim Salarich	Spain	Disqualified					
	83	Dmytro Shepiuk	Ukraine	Disqualified					
