= FIS Alpine World Ski Championships 2023 – Men's giant slalom =

FIS Alpine World Ski Championships 2023 at the Men's giant slalom
- Venue: L'Éclipse
- Location: Courchevel, France
- Dates: 16 February (qualification); 17 February
- Competitors: 100 from 64 nations
- Winning time: 2:34.08

Medalists
gold medal	Marco Odermatt	Switzerland
silver medal	Loïc Meillard	Switzerland
bronze medal	Marco Schwarz	Austria

Men's Giant Slalom
- Location: L'Éclipse; Courchevel, France
- Vertical: 450 m (1,476 ft)
- Top elevation: 1,730 m (5,676 ft)
- Base elevation: 1,280 m (4,199 ft)

The Men's giant slalom competition at the FIS Alpine World Ski Championships 2023 was held at L'Éclipse ski course in Courchevel on 16 and 17 February 2023.

== Results ==
=== Final ===
The final was started on 17 February at 10:00 and 13:30.

Rank	Bib	Name	Nation	Run 1	Rank	Run 2	Rank	Total	Diff
1st place, gold medalist(s)	1	Marco Odermatt	Switzerland	1:20.05	2	1:14.03	5	2:34.08	—
2nd place, silver medalist(s)	4	Loïc Meillard	Switzerland	1:20.60	4	1:13.80	1	2:34.40	+0.32
3rd place, bronze medalist(s)	3	Marco Schwarz	Austria	1:19.47	1	1:15.01	18	2:34.48	+0.40
4	14	Stefan Brennsteiner	Austria	1:20.84	6	1:14.00	4	2:34.84	+0.76
5	2	Henrik Kristoffersen	Norway	1:20.88	7	1:14.16	7	2:35.04	+0.96
6	7	Žan Kranjec	Slovenia	1:20.23	3	1:15.19	20	2:35.42	+1.34
7	6	Alexis Pinturault	France	1:21.95	11	1:13.81	2	2:35.76	+1.68
8	15	Filip Zubčić	Croatia	1:21.46	8	1:14.82	16	2:36.28	+2.20
9	10	Gino Caviezel	Switzerland	1:21.70	9	1:14.62	12	2:36.32	+2.24
10	19	Filippo Della Vite	Italy	1:21.87	10	1:14.55	9	2:36.42	+2.34
11	24	Giovanni Borsotti	Italy	1:22.48	18	1:14.06	6	2:36.54	+2.46
12	13	River Radamus	United States	1:22.70	20	1:13.98	3	2:36.68	+2.60
13	18	Raphael Haaser	Austria	1:22.11	12	1:14.64	13	2:36.75	+2.67
14	11	Luca De Aliprandini	Italy	1:22.14	14	1:14.85	8	2:36.99	+2.91
15	12	Alexander Schmid	Germany	1:22.53	19	1:14.74	15	2:37.27	+3.19
16	8	Rasmus Windingstad	Norway	1:22.79	21	1:14.56	10	2:37.35	+3.27
17	34	Charlie Raposo	Great Britain	1:23.53	26	1:14.44	17	2:37.97	+3.89
18	23	Thomas Tumler	Switzerland	1:23.68	27	1:14.68	14	2:38.36	+4.28
19	9	Mathieu Faivre	France	1:23.44	25	1:15.13	19	2:38.57	+4.49
20	27	Brian McLaughlin	United States	1:24.07	30	1:14.57	11	2:38.64	+4.56
21	29	Mattias Rönngren	Sweden	1:22.29	15	1:14.85	26	2:38.73	+4.65
22	22	Alexander Steen Olsen	Norway	1:22.12	13	1:16.73	27	2:38.85	+4.77
23	44	Albert Ortega	Spain	1:23.41	24	1:15.58	21	2:38.99	+4.91
24	28	Leo Anguenot	France	1:22.94	22	1:16.15	25	2:39.09	+5.01
25	31	Harry Laidlaw	Australia	1:23.78	28	1:15.72	22	2:39.50	+5.42
26	39	Seigo Kato	Japan	1:23.78	28	1:15.80	23	2:39.58	+5.50
27	40	Alban Elezi Cannaferina	France	1:24.21	31	1:15.97	24	2:40.18	+6.10
28	37	Christian Borgnaes	Denmark	1:24.78	34	1:17.09	28	2:41.87	+7.79
29	46	Aingeru Garay	Spain	1:24.47	32	1:17.47	29	2:41.94	+7.86
30	54	Piotr Habdas	Poland	1:25.43	37	1:17.55	30	2:42.98	+8.90
31	43	Tormis Laine	Estonia	1:26.08	38	1:18.12	31	2:44.20	+10.12
32	71	Denni Xhepa	Albania	1:26.42	39	1:18.62	32	2:45.04	+10.96
33	61	Martin Hyška	Slovakia	1:26.84	41	1:19.26	34	2:46.10	+12.02
34	53	Tiziano Gravier	Argentina	1:27.62	43	1:19.18	33	2:46.80	+12.72
35	58	Albert Popov	Bulgaria	1:26.51	40	1:20.66	35	2:47.17	+13.09
36	49	Teo Žampa	Slovakia	1:27.22	42	1:20.74	36	2:47.96	+13.88
37	65	Žaks Gedra	Latvia	1:28.93	45	1:21.15	37	2:50.08	+16.00
38	68	Richardson Viano	Haiti	1:29.64	48	1:21.57	38	2:51.21	+17.13
39	72	Komiljon Tukhtaev	Uzbekistan	1:30.61	50	1:21.78	39	2:52.39	+18.31
40	79	Cormac Comerford	Ireland	1:30.68	51	1:22.07	40	2:52.75	+18.67
41	51	Jack Adams	New Zealand	1:30.78	52	1:22.49	41	2:53.27	+19.19
42	81	Ivan Kovbasnyuk	Ukraine	1:29.96	49	1:23.78	42	2:53.74	+19.66
43	70	Matthieu Osch	Luxembourg	1:29.60	47	1:24.22	43	2:53.82	+19.74
44	76	Nathan Tchibozo	Togo	1:33.75	53	1:24.96	45	2:58.71	+24.63
45	78	Gauti Guðmundsson	Iceland	1:37.83	56	1:24.62	44	3:02.45	+28.37
46	97	Luka Buchukuri	Georgia	1:36.68	54	1:27.04	48	3:03.72	+29.64
47	86	Mohammad Kiadarbandsari	Iran	1:37.26	55	1:26.64	47	3:03.90	+29.82
48	94	Mathieu Neumuller	Madagascar	1:38.77	57	1:25.68	46	3:04.45	+30.37
49	82	Cesar Arnouk	Lebanon	1:39.83	58	1:31.12	49	3:10.95	+36.87
50	75	Yianno Kouyoumdjan	Cyprus	1:40.22	59	1:31.80	50	3:12.02	+37.94
51	91	Matteo Gatti	San Marino	1:43.44	60	1:34.39	51	3:17.83	+43.75
	5	Manuel Feller	Austria	1:20.74	5	Did not finish			
	20	Tommy Ford	United States	1:22.35	16	Did not finish			
	17	Erik Read	Canada	1:22.45	17	Did not finish			
	36	Alex Vinatzer	Italy	1:23.18	23	Did not finish			
	33	Samu Torsti	Finland	1:24.69	33	Did not finish			
	30	Fabian Gratz	Germany	1:25.10	35	Did not finish			
	47	Hugh McAdam	Australia	1:28.23	44	Did not finish			
	48	Delfin Van Ditmar	Argentina	1:29.26	46	Did not finish			
	25	Adam Žampa	Slovakia	1:25.12	36	Did not start			
	88	Yohan Goutt Gonçalves	Timor-Leste	1:43.76	61	Did not qualify			
	98	Christopher Rubens Holm	Brazil	1:46.03	62	Did not qualify			
	89	Yassine Aouich	Morocco	1:55.25	63	Did not qualify			
	85	Carlos Maeder	Ghana	2:02.38	64	Did not qualify			
	16	Aleksander Aamodt Kilde	Norway	Did not finish					
	21	Joan Verdú	Andorra	Did not finish					
	32	Maarten Meiners	Netherlands	Did not finish					
	35	Andrej Drukarov	Lithuania	Did not finish					
	38	Louis Muhlen-Schulte	Australia	Did not finish					
	41	Jan Zabystřan	Czech Republic	Did not finish					
	42	Filip Forejtek	Czech Republic	Did not finish					
	45	Eduard Hallberg	Finland	Did not finish					
	50	Tomás Birkner de Miguel	Argentina	Did not finish					
	52	Calum Langmuir	Great Britain	Did not finish					
	55	Felipe Eiras	Argentina	Did not finish					
	56	Bálint Úry	Hungary	Did not finish					
	57	Emir Lokmić	Bosnia and Herzegovina	Did not finish					
	59	Kay Holscher	Chile	Did not finish					
	60	Tvrtko Ljutić	Croatia	Did not finish					
	62	Juhan Luik	Estonia	Did not finish					
	63	Diego León	Chile	Did not finish					
	64	Benjamin Szőllős	Israel	Did not finish					
	66	Leon Nikić	Croatia	Did not finish					
	67	Konstantin Stoilov	Bulgaria	Did not finish					
	69	Kalin Zlatkov	Bulgaria	Did not finish					
	73	Márton Kékesi	Hungary	Did not finish					
	74	Mirko Lazareski	North Macedonia	Did not finish					
	77	Rastko Blagojević	Serbia	Did not finish					
	80	Ioannis Antoniou	Greece	Did not finish					
	83	Alexandru Ștefan Ștefănescu	Romania	Did not finish					
	84	Manuel Ramos	Portugal	Did not finish					
	87	Hubertus Von Hohenlohe	Mexico	Did not finish					
	90	Arbi Pupovci	Kosovo	Did not finish					
	92	Bojan Kosić	Montenegro	Did not finish					
	93	Arif Mohd Khan	India	Did not finish					
	95	Harutyun Harutyunyan	Armenia	Did not finish					
	99	Timur Shakirov	Kyrgyzstan	Did not finish					
	100	Jerome Philippe Coss	Cape Verde	Did not finish					
	96	Chao Xinbo	China	Disqualified					
	26	Sam Maes	Belgium	Did not start					

=== Qualification ===
The qualification was held on 16 February at 10:00 and 13:30.

Rank	Bib	Name	Nation	Run 1	Rank	Run 2	Rank	Total	Diff	Notes
1	18	Benjamin Szőllős	Israel	1:12.49	3	1:08.64	1	2:21.13		
2	1	Piotr Habdas	Poland	1:12.69	7	1:08.74	3	2:21.43	+0.30	
3	14	Albert Popov	Bulgaria	1:12.35	1	1:09.11	7	2:21.46	+0.33	
4	4	Barnabás Szőllős	Israel	1:12.66	6	1:08.88	5	2:21.54	+0.41	
5	28	Denni Xhepa	Albania	1:13.47	12	1:08.22	1	2:21.69	+0.56	
6	3	Tiziano Gravier	Argentina	1:12.69	8	1:09.08	6	2:21.77	+0.64	
7	7	Calum Langmuir	Great Britain	1:12.61	5	1:09.26	9	2:21.87	+0.74	
8	2	Bálint Úry	Hungary	1:12.46	2	1:10.25	21	2:22.71	+1.58	
9	21	Leon Nikić	Croatia	1:14.05	17	1:08.86	4	2:22.91	+1.78	
10	19	Žaks Gedra	Latvia	1:13.74	13	1:09.19	8	2:22.93	+1.80	
11	17	Diego León	Chile	1:13.22	10	1:09.83	13	2:23.05	+1.92	
12	15	Kay Holscher	Chile	1:12.77	9	1:10.52	26	2:23.29	+2.16	
13	23	Konstantin Stoilov	Bulgaria	1:14.01	16	1:09.54	12	2:23.55	+2.42	
14	9	Tvrtko Ljutić	Croatia	1:13.35	11	1:10.21	20	2:23.56	+2.43	
15	8	Tomás Birkner de Miguel	Argentina	1:13.97	15	1:10.01	17	2:23.98	+2.85	
16	26	Kalin Zlatkov	Bulgaria	1:14.73	21	1:09.35	10	2:24.08	+2.95	
17	25	Richardson Viano	Haiti	1:13.75	14	1:10.48	25	2:24.23	+3.10	
18	6	Martin Hyška	Slovakia	1:12.56	4	1:11.94	29	2:24.50	+3.37	
19	5	Jack Adams	New Zealand	1:14.60	19	1:10.00	15	2:24.60	+3.47	
20	16	Juhan Luik	Estonia	1:14.46	18	1:10.20	19	2:24.66	+3.53	
21	27	Matthieu Osch	Luxembourg	1:14.71	20	1:10.12	18	2:24.83	+3.70	
22	10	Emir Lokmić	Bosnia and Herzegovina	1:15.07	23	1:09.93	14	2:25.00	+3.87	
23	44	Ioannis Antoniou	Greece	1:14.93	22	1:10.27	22	2:25.20	+4.07	
24	12	Felipe Eiras	Argentina	1:15.88	29	1:09.37	11	2:25.25	+4.12	
25	32	Márton Kékesi	Hungary	1:15.23	25	1:10.38	23	2:25.61	+4.48	
26	31	Kevin Qerimi	Albania	1:15.85	28	1:10.00	15	2:25.85	+4.72	
27	22	Casper Dyrbye	Denmark	1:15.77	27	1:10.41	24	2:26.18	+5.05	
28	24	Lauris Opmanis	Latvia	1:15.22	24	1:11.25	27	2:26.47	+5.34	
29	42	Christian Skov Jensen	Denmark	1:15.96	30	1:12.26	31	2:28.22	+7.09	
30	29	Elvis Opmanis	Latvia	1:16.42	31	1:12.74	32	2:29.16	+8.03	
31	41	Marcus Christian Riis	Denmark	1:17.50	34	1:11.82	28	2:29.32	+8.19	
32	39	Gauti Guðmundsson	Iceland	1:17.69	36	1:12.09	30	2:29.78	+8.65	
33	45	Ivan Kovbasnyuk	Ukraine	1:17.33	33	1:13.62	33	2:30.95	+9.82	
34	33	Mirko Lazareski	North Macedonia	1:17.87	38	1:13.69	34	2:31.56	+10.43	
35	49	Maksym Mariichyn	Ukraine	1:18.33	39	1:14.43	37	2:32.76	+11.63	
36	47	Alexandru Ștefan Ștefănescu	Romania	1:17.74	37	1:15.41	41	2:33.15	+12.02	
37	40	Viktor Petkov	North Macedonia	1:19.50	42	1:14.38	36	2:33.88	+12.75	
38	63	Jón Erik Sigurðsson	Iceland	1:19.73	45	1:14.26	35	2:33.99	+12.86	
39	73	Mathieu Neumuller	Madagascar	1:19.46	41	1:14.93	39	2:34.39	+13.26	
40	53	Mohammad Kiadarbandsari	Iran	1:19.71	44	1:14.88	38	2:34.59	+13.46	
41	60	Dmytro Shepiuk	Ukraine	1:19.66	43	1:14.96	40	2:34.62	+13.49	
42	51	Joachim Keghian	Luxembourg	1:19.02	40	1:15.74	43	2:34.76	+13.63	
43	59	Mohammad Saveh-Shemshaki	Iran	1:19.88	46	1:15.97	44	2:35.85	+14.72	
43	54	Taras Filiak	Ukraine	1:20.30	48	1:15.55	42	2:35.85	+14.72	
45	76	Jakov Dobreski	Bulgaria	1:20.10	47	1:16.55	46	2:36.65	+15.52	
46	99	Medet Nazarov	Uzbekistan	1:21.14	50	1:16.33	45	2:37.47	+16.34	
47	46	Cesar Arnouk	Lebanon	1:20.95	49	1:17.70	48	2:38.65	+17.52	
48	55	Gustavs Harijs Ābele	Latvia	1:21.39	51	1:18.01	49	2:39.40	+18.27	
49	79	Luca Poberai	Lithuania	1:22.51	54	1:17.42	47	2:39.93	+18.80	
50	66	Mackenson Florindo	Haiti	1:22.48	53	1:19.74	51	2:42.22	+21.09	
51	75	Harutyun Harutyunyan	Armenia	1:24.56	59	1:18.26	50	2:42.82	+21.69	
52	74	Alberto Tamagnini	San Marino	1:23.14	57	1:19.80	52	2:42.94	+21.81	
53	65	Matteo Gatti	San Marino	1:23.92	58	1:20.71	56	2:44.63	+23.50	
54	90	Timur Shakirov	Kyrgyzstan	1:24.61	60	1:20.05	54	2:44.66	+23.53	
55	77	Chao Xinbo	China	1:25.55	63	1:19.84	53	2:45.39	+24.26	
56	93	Zhao Shuyang	China	1:25.26	61	1:20.48	55	2:45.74	+24.61	
57	84	Klos Vokshi	Kosovo	1:28.04	69	1:20.75	57	2:48.79	+27.66	
58	64	Arbi Pupovci	Kosovo	1:25.33	62	1:24.45	63	2:49.78	+28.65	
59	87	Cyril Kayrouz	Lebanon	1:28.04	70	1:22.25	58	2:50.29	+29.16	
60	86	Mattia Beccari	San Marino	1:27.61	68	1:22.81	59	2:50.42	+29.29	
61	82	Drin Kokaj	Kosovo	1:27.33	67	1:23.10	60	2:50.43	+29.30	
62	95	Nadim Mukhtarov	Kyrgyzstan	1:28.25	71	1:23.30	61	2:51.55	+30.42	
63	68	Bojan Kosić	Montenegro	1:28.44	72	1:24.42	62	2:52.86	+31.73	
64	88	Riad Tawk	Lebanon	1:29.16	73	1:25.53	65	2:54.69	+33.56	
65	98	Borjan Strezoski	North Macedonia	1:31.81	76	1:24.63	64	2:56.44	+35.31	
66	70	Arif Mohd Khan	India	1:30.01	74	1:28.06	66	2:58.07	+36.94	
67	94	Anthony Mrad	Lebanon	1:36.57	78	1:30.24	67	3:06.81	+45.68	
68	97	Mayank Panwar	India	1:38.95	79	1:30.40	68	3:09.35	+48.22	
69	106	Artur Abrahamyan	Armenia	1:41.38	81	1:32.81	69	3:14.19	+53.06	
70	107	Yogesh Kumar	India	1:41.34	80	1:35.42	70	3:16.76	+55.63	
71	102	Hakob Hakobyan	Armenia	1:44.57	82	1:48.90	72	3:33.47	+1:12.34	
72	104	Kasete-Naufahu Skeen	Tonga	1:55.55	83	1:47.55	71	3:43.10	+1:21.97	
73	100	Jerome Philippe Coss	Cape Verde	2:00.17	84	2:00.54	73	4:00.71	+1:39.58	
74	105	Jean-Pierre Roy	Haiti	2:06.89	85	2:04.08	74	4:10.97	+1:49.84	
	43	Cormac Comerford	Ireland	1:15.55	26	Did not finish				
	30	Komiljon Tukhtaev	Uzbekistan	1:17.05	32	Did not finish				
	37	Nathan Tchibozo	Togo	1:17.64	35	Did not finish				
	34	Raul Danciu	Romania	1:21.49	52	Did not finish				
	69	Apostolos Vougioukas	Greece	1:22.59	55	Did not finish				
	85	Christopher Rubens Holm	Brazil	1:22.75	56	Did not finish				
	83	Arman Gayupov	Uzbekistan	1:26.00	64	Did not finish				
	89	Vakaris Jokubas Lapienis	Lithuania	1:27.03	65	Did not finish				
	91	Zhao Peizhe	China	1:27.09	66	Did not finish				
	58	Yohan Goutt Gonçalves	Timor-Leste	1:30.86	75	Did not finish				
	52	Carlos Maeder	Ghana	1:35.30	77	Did not finish				
	11	Marko Šljivić	Bosnia and Herzegovina	Did not finish						
	13	Sven von Appen	Chile	Did not finish						
	20	Dino Terzić	Bosnia and Herzegovina	Did not finish						
	35	Bence Nagy	Hungary	Did not finish						
	36	Yianno Kouyoumdjan	Cyprus	Did not finish						
	38	Rastko Blagojević	Serbia	Did not finish						
	48	Manuel Ramos	Portugal	Did not finish						
	50	Veselin Zlatković	Serbia	Did not finish						
	56	Hubertus Von Hohenlohe	Mexico	Did not finish						
	57	Morteza Jafari	Iran	Did not finish						
	61	Yassine Aouich	Morocco	Did not finish						
	62	Milivoje Mačar	Bosnia and Herzegovina	Did not finish						
	71	Nikolaos Mavropoulos	Greece	Did not finish						
	72	Amir Ali Alizadeh	Iran	Did not finish						
	78	Maksim Gordeev	Kyrgyzstan	Did not finish						
	80	Luka Buchukuri	Georgia	Did not finish						
	81	Athanasios Tsitselis	Greece	Did not finish						
	92	Nodar Kozanashvili	Georgia	Did not finish						
	96	Irakli Argvliani	Georgia	Did not finish						
	101	Mahdi Idhya	Morocco	Did not finish						
	103	Vasil Veriga	Albania	Did not finish						
	67	Liu Xiaochen	China	Disqualified						
