= FIS Alpine World Ski Championships 2023 – Men's slalom =

FIS Alpine World Ski Championships 2023 at the Men's slalom
- Venue: L'Éclipse
- Location: Courchevel, France
- Dates: 18 February (qualification); 19 February
- Competitors: 100 from 58 nations
- Winning time: 1:39.50

Medalists
gold medal	Henrik Kristoffersen	Norway
silver medal	AJ Ginnis	Greece
bronze medal	Alex Vinatzer	Italy

The Men's slalom competition at the FIS Alpine World Ski Championships 2023 was held at L'Éclipse ski course in Courchevel on 18 and 19 February 2023.

== Results ==
=== Final ===
The first run was started on 19 February at 10:00 and the second run at 13:30.

Rank	Bib	Name	Nation	Run 1	Rank	Run 2	Rank	Total	Diff
1st place, gold medalist(s)	6	Henrik Kristoffersen	Norway	47.84	16	51.66	1	1:39.50	—
2nd place, silver medalist(s)	24	AJ Ginnis	Greece	47.06	2	52.64	12	1:39.70	+0.20
3rd place, bronze medalist(s)	17	Alex Vinatzer	Italy	47.37	6	52.51	9	1:39.88	+0.38
4	15	Clément Noël	France	47.57	8	52.34	6	1:39.91	+0.41
5	30	Sebastian Holzmann	Germany	47.93	18	52.19	4	1:40.12	+0.62
6	13	Marco Schwarz	Austria	47.64	9	52.51	9	1:40.15	+0.65
7	7	Lucas Braathen	Norway	47.06	2	53.11	18	1:40.17	+0.67
7	4	Manuel Feller	Austria	46.93	1	53.24	21	1:40.17	+0.67
9	5	Linus Strasser	Germany	47.07	4	53.12	19	1:40.19	+0.69
9	3	Ramon Zenhäusern	Switzerland	47.74	12	52.45	7	1:40.19	+0.69
11	22	Filip Zubčić	Croatia	48.34	24	51.89	2	1:40.23	+0.73
12	18	Adrian Pertl	Austria	47.76	14	52.48	8	1:40.24	+0.74
13	10	Dave Ryding	Great Britain	48.10	21	52.22	5	1:40.32	+0.82
14	21	Marc Rochat	Switzerland	47.81	15	52.27	11	1:40.38	+0.88
15	40	Tobias Kastlunger	Italy	48.58	27	51.95	3	1:40.53	+1.03
16	8	Fabio Gstrein	Austria	47.49	7	53.30	24	1:40.79	+1.29
17	16	Timon Haugan	Norway	47.95	20	52.86	15	1:40.81	+1.31
18	23	Stefano Gross	Italy	47.89	17	52.94	16	1:40.83	+1.33
19	11	Sebastian Foss-Solevåg	Norway	47.28	5	53.58	28	1:40.86	+1.36
20	9	Alexis Pinturault	France	47.65	11	53.25	22	1:40.90	+1.40
21	41	Juan del Campo	Spain	48.31	23	52.70	13	1:41.01	+1.51
22	20	Alexander Steen Olsen	Norway	47.75	13	53.30	24	1:41.05	+1.55
23	14	Tommaso Sala	Italy	47.64	9	53.49	27	1:41.13	+1.63
24	2	Daniel Yule	Switzerland	48.30	22	52.97	17	1:41.27	+1.77
25	29	Armand Marchant	Belgium	48.83	30	52.77	14	1:41.60	+2.10
26	46	Tijan Marovt	Slovenia	48.52	25	53.21	20	1:41.73	+2.23
27	36	Steven Amiez	France	47.93	18	54.04	32	1:41.90	+2.47
28	34	Billy Major	Great Britain	48.69	28	53.45	26	1:42.14	+2.64
29	47	Léo Anguenot	France	49.17	34	53.27	23	1:42.44	+2.94
30	26	Luke Winters	United States	49.02	31	53.87	29	1:42.89	+3.39
31	25	Erik Read	Canada	49.17	34	54.08	33	1:43.25	+3.75
32	35	Benjamin Ritchie	United States	49.39	37	53.89	30	1:43.28	+3.78
33	42	Laurie Taylor	Great Britain	49.57	39	53.98	31	1:43.55	+4.05
34	27	Samuel Kolega	Croatia	49.20	36	54.75	35	1:43.95	+4.45
35	51	Aingeru Garay	Spain	49.44	38	54.81	36	1:44.25	+4.75
36	38	Matej Vidović	Croatia	49.11	33	55.31	38	1:44.42	+4.92
37	33	Yohei Koyama	Japan	50.14	43	54.35	34	1:44.49	+4.99
38	49	Axel Esteve	Andorra	49.75	41	55.19	37	1:44.94	+5.44
39	48	Miks Zvejnieks	Latvia	49.72	40	55.68	39	1:45.40	+5.90
40	60	Kalin Zlatkov	Bulgaria	50.71	44	56.44	43	1:47.15	+7.65
41	73	Bálint Úry	Hungary	51.31	45	56.35	42	1:47.66	+8.16
42	58	Barnabás Szőllős	Israel	51.67	47	56.29	41	1:47.66	+8.46
43	52	Filip Forejtek	Czech Republic	52.18	51	56.97	44	1:49.15	+9.65
44	71	Cristian Javier Simari Birkner	Argentina	51.71	49	57.60	46	1:49.31	+9.81
45	61	Emir Lokmić	Bosnia and Herzegovina	53.08	52	57.32	45	1:50.40	+10.90
46	66	Cormac Comerford	Ireland	54.53	57	56.13	40	1:50.66	+11.16
47	86	Komiljon Tukhtaev	Uzbekistan	53.41	53	59.67	48	1:53.08	+13.58
48	74	Matthieu Osch	Luxembourg	53.84	56	59.51	47	1:53.35	+13.85
49	81	Rastko Blagojević	Serbia	55.21	58	1:01.94	49	1:57.15	+17.65
50	64	Jack Adams	New Zealand	53.52	54	1:04.30	52	1:57.82	+18.32
51	76	Kevin Qerimi	Albania	53.59	55	1:05.13	53	1:58.72	+19.22
52	82	Mohammad Kiadarbandsari	Iran	56.97	59	1:03.49	50	2:00.46	+20.96
53	98	Jakov Dobreski	North Macedonia	57.51	60	1:04.05	51	2:01.56	+22.06
	28	Joaquim Salarich	Spain	48.74	29	Did not finish			
	32	Istok Rodeš	Croatia	49.02	31	Did not finish			
	39	Kamen Zlatkov	Bulgaria	48.55	26	Did not finish			
	43	Jesper Pohjolainen	Finland	49.86	42	Did not finish			
	62	Ed Guigonnet	Great Britain	51.70	48	Did not finish			
	63	Tiziano Gravier	Argentina	51.55	46	Did not finish			
	65	Tamás Trunk	Hungary	52.01	50	Did not finish			
	79	Raul Danciu	Romania	57.57	61	Did not qualify			
	94	Mathieu Neumuller	Madagascar	58.21	62	Did not qualify			
	75	Nathan Tchibozo	Togo	59.11	63	Did not qualify			
	93	Christopher Rubens Holm	Brazil	1:00.03	64	Did not qualify			
	92	Maksim Gordeev	Kyrgyzstan	1:00.72	65	Did not qualify			
	95	Manuel Ramos	Portugal	1:02.14	66	Did not qualify			
	91	Yohan Goutt Gonçalves	Timor-Leste	1:02.86	67	Did not qualify			
	89	Arif Mohd Khan	India	1:04.83	68	Did not qualify			
	96	Bojan Kosić	Montenegro	1:05.30	69	Did not qualify			
	78	Gauti Guðmundsson	Iceland	1:07.20	70	Did not qualify			
	1	Loïc Meillard	Switzerland	Did not finish					
	12	Kristoffer Jakobsen	Sweden	Did not finish					
	19	Albert Popov	Bulgaria	Did not finish					
	31	Žan Kranjec	Slovenia	Did not finish					
	37	Alexander Schmid	Germany	Did not finish					
	44	Jett Seymour	United States	Did not finish					
	45	Sam Maes	Belgium	Did not finish					
	50	Michal Jasiczek	Poland	Did not finish					
	53	Eduard Hallberg	Finland	Did not finish					
	54	Tormis Laine	Estonia	Did not finish					
	55	Martin Hyška	Slovakia	Did not finish					
	56	Seigo Kato	Japan	Did not finish					
	57	Louis Muhlen-Schulte	Australia	Did not finish					
	59	Tom Verbeke	Belgium	Did not finish					
	67	Casper Dyrbye	Denmark	Did not finish					
	68	Delfin Van Ditmar	Argentina	Did not finish					
	69	Ioannis Antoniou	Greece	Did not finish					
	70	Márton Kékesi	Hungary	Did not finish					
	72	Kay Holscher	Chile	Did not finish					
	77	Konstantin Stoilov	Bulgaria	Did not finish					
	80	Dmytro Shepiuk	Ukraine	Did not finish					
	83	Richardson Viano	Haiti	Did not finish					
	84	Mohammad Saveh-Shemshaki	Iran	Did not finish					
	87	Harutyun Harutyunyan	Armenia	Did not finish					
	88	Yianno Kouyoumdjan	Cyprus	Did not finish					
	90	Arbi Pupovci	KOS	Did not finish					
	97	Alberto Tamagnini	San Marino	Did not finish					
	99	Cyril Kayrouz	Lebanon	Did not finish					
	85	Tanguy Pechoux	Algeria	Disqualified					
	100	Luca Poberai	Lithuania	Disqualified					

=== Qualification ===
The qualification was held on 18 February at 10:00 and 13:30.

Rank	Bib	Name	Nation	Run 1	Rank	Run 2	Rank	Total	Diff	Notes
1	10	Tormis Laine	Estonia	49.07	4	50.54	1	1:39.61	—	
2	3	Seigo Kato	Japan	49.18	5	51.48	5	1:40.66	+1.05	
3	13	Eduard Hallberg	Finland	49.99	7	50.74	2	1:40.73	+1.12	
4	1	Kalin Zlatkov	Bulgaria	49.61	6	52.34	14	1:41.95	+2.34	
5	20	Cormac Comerford	Ireland	50.38	10	51.68	6	1:42.06	+2.45	
6	2	Aingeru Garay	Spain	48.89	2	53.25	19	1:42.14	+2.53	
7	31	Bálint Úry	Hungary	50.37	9	52.74	16	1:43.11	+3.50	
8	14	Ed Guigonnet	Great Britain	50.56	11	52.68	15	1:43.24	+3.63	
9	26	Ioannis Antoniou	Greece	51.16	13	52.21	10	1:43.37	+3.76	
10	15	Emir Lokmić	Bosnia and Herzegovina	51.54	15	51.89	9	1:43.43	+3.82	
11	36	Konstantin Stoilov	Bulgaria	51.67	17	51.84	8	1:43.51	+3.90	
12	27	Márton Kékesi	Hungary	52.25	24	51.33	3	1:43.58	+3.97	
13	28	Cristian Javier Simari Birkner	Argentina	52.28	25	51.36	4	1:43.64	+4.03	
14	21	Casper Dyrbye	Denmark	51.50	14	52.29	12	1:43.79	+4.18	
15	18	Tamás Trunk	Hungary	51.70	19	52.32	13	1:44.02	+4.41	
16	30	Kay Holscher	Chile	52.37	27	51.77	7	1:44.14	+4.53	
17	9	Tiziano Gravier	Argentina	51.95	22	52.28	11	1:44.23	+4.62	
18	11	Tom Verbeke	Belgium	50.85	12	53.65	21	1:44.50	+4.89	
19	23	Delfin Van Ditmar	Argentina	51.69	18	53.51	20	1:45.20	+5.59	
20	49	Richardson Viano	Haiti	53.56	28	53.06	18	1:46.62	+7.01	
21	64	Komiljon Tukhtaev	Uzbekistan	54.26	30	52.79	17	1:47.05	+7.44	
22	45	Dmytro Shepiuk	Ukraine	53.85	29	54.24	22	1:48.09	+8.48	
23	56	Mohammad Saveh-Shemshaki	Iran	54.32	31	55.19	24	1:49.51	+9.90	
23	48	Mohammad Kiadarbandsari	Iran	54.63	33	54.88	23	1:49.51	+9.90	
25	35	Kevin Qerimi	Albania	51.79	20	1:00.79	33	1:52.58	+12.97	
26	57	Tanguy Pechoux	Algeria	55.56	37	58.26	26	1:53.82	+14.21	
27	80	Mathieu Neumuller	Madagascar	56.72	41	57.38	25	1:54.10	+14.49	
28	107	Luka Buchukuri	Georgia	56.77	43	1:00.40	31	1:57.17	+17.56	
29	44	Raul Danciu	Romania	56.74	42	1:00.58	32	1:57.32	+17.71	
30	96	Luca Poberai	Lithuania	58.85	49	58.70	28	1:57.55	+17.94	
31	79	Christopher Rubens Holm	Brazil	59.30	50	59.14	29	1:58.44	+18.83	
32	82	Mackenson Florindo	Haiti	1:01.18	55	58.58	27	1:59.76	+20.15	
33	91	Matteo Gatti	San Marino	1:00.32	53	1:01.29	35	2:01.61	+22.00	
34	100	Liu Xiaochen	China	1:02.22	60	1:00.01	30	2:02.23	+22.62	
35	81	Manuel Ramos	Portugal	1:01.23	57	1:01.22	34	2:02.45	+22.84	
36	77	Yohan Goutt Gonçalves	Timor-Leste	1:01.22	56	1:02.52	36	2:03.74	+24.13	
37	75	Arbi Pupovci	KOS	1:00.49	54	1:03.97	38	2:04.46	+24.85	
38	90	Cyril Kayrouz	Lebanon	1:01.70	59	1:04.17	39	2:05.87	+26.26	
39	98	Zhao Peizhe	China	1:06.96	66	1:02.81	37	2:09.77	+30.16	
40	93	Riad Tawk	Lebanon	1:05.18	63	1:07.10	41	2:12.28	+32.67	
41	104	Zhao Shuyang	China	1:06.04	65	1:06.35	40	2:12.39	+32.78	
42	118	Timur Shakirov	Kyrgyzstan	1:05.34	64	1:11.59	42	2:16.93	+37.32	
43	117	Hakob Hakobyan	Armenia	1:13.33	69	1:12.73	43	2:26.06	+46.45	
44	114	Jerome Philippe Coss	Cape Verde	1:40.41	70	1:45.64	44	3:26.05	+1:46.44	
45	116	Jean-Pierre Roy	Haiti	1:56.33	71	2:07.60	45	4:03.93	+2:24.32	
	7	Filip Forejtek	Czech Republic	48.86	1	Did not finish				
	8	Louis Muhlen-Schulte	Australia	49.02	3	Did not finish				
	16	Benjamin Szőllős	Israel	50.23	8	Did not finish				
	32	Matthieu Osch	Luxembourg	51.62	16	Did not finish				
	19	Ioannis Proios	Greece	52.20	23	Did not finish				
	34	Juhan Luik	Estonia	52.34	26	Did not finish				
	37	Christian Skov Jensen	Denmark	54.57	32	Did not finish				
	47	Alexandru Ștefan Ștefănescu	Romania	54.72	34	Did not finish				
	51	Morteza Jafari	Iran	54.83	35	Did not finish				
	43	Taras Filiak	Ukraine	54.88	36	Did not finish				
	52	Maksym Mariichyn	Ukraine	55.92	38	Did not finish				
	65	Marcus Christian Riis	Denmark	56.41	39	Did not finish				
	46	Rastko Blagojević	Serbia	56.51	40	Did not finish				
	62	Gustavs Harijs Ābele	Latvia	56.86	44	Did not finish				
	25	Tomás Birkner de Miguel	Argentina	57.08	45	Did not finish				
	87	Jakov Dobreski	Bulgaria	57.71	46	Did not finish				
	6	Barnabas Szőllős	Israel	57.90	47	Did not finish				
	70	Cesar Arnouk	Lebanon	58.28	48	Did not finish				
	73	Ricardo Brancal	Portugal	59.66	52	Did not finish				
	105	Chao Xinbo	China	1:01.52	58	Did not finish				
	85	Alberto Tamagnini	San Marino	1:03.16	61	Did not finish				
	111	Hubertus Von Hohenlohe	Mexico	1:10.34	67	Did not finish				
	95	Yogesh Kumar	India	1:13.09	68	Did not finish				
	24	Hugh McAdam	Australia	51.80	21	Disqualified				
	101	Vakaris Jokūbas Lapienis	Lithuania	59.54	51	Disqualified				
	102	Nadim Mukhtarov	Kyrgyzstan	1:04.93	62	Disqualified				
	5	Martin Hyška	Slovakia	Did not finish						
	12	Marko Šljivić	Bosnia and Herzegovina	Did not finish						
	17	Jack Adams	New Zealand	Did not finish						
	22	Denni Xhepa	Albania	Did not finish						
	29	Diego León	Chile	Did not finish						
	33	Nathan Tchibozo	Togo	Did not finish						
	39	Dino Terzić	Bosnia and Herzegovina	Did not finish						
	41	Elvis Opmanis	Latvia	Did not finish						
	42	Dardan Dehari	North Macedonia	Did not finish						
	50	Viktor Petkov	North Macedonia	Did not finish						
	53	Mirko Lazareski	North Macedonia	Did not finish						
	54	Valentino Caputi	Brazil	Did not finish						
	55	Lauris Opmanis	Latvia	Did not finish						
	58	Jón Erik Sigurðsson	Iceland	Did not finish						
	59	Ivan Kovbasnyuk	Ukraine	Did not finish						
	60	Athanasios Tsitselis	Greece	Did not finish						
	61	Joachim Keghian	Luxembourg	Did not finish						
	63	Milivoje Mačar	Bosnia and Herzegovina	Did not finish						
	66	Harutyun Harutyunyan	Armenia	Did not finish						
	67	Yianno Kouyoumdjan	Cyprus	Did not finish						
	68	Baptiste Araújo	Portugal	Did not finish						
	71	Vilius Aleksandravičius	Lithuania	Did not finish						
	72	Arif Mohd Khan	India	Did not finish						
	74	Povilas Lenkutis	Latvia	Did not finish						
	76	Veselin Zlatković	Serbia	Did not finish						
	78	Maksim Gordeev	Kyrgyzstan	Did not finish						
	83	Arman Gayupov	Uzbekistan	Did not finish						
	84	Bojan Kosić	Montenegro	Did not finish						
	86	Mayank Panwar	India	Did not finish						
	88	Drin Kokaj	KOS	Did not finish						
	89	Medet Nazarov	Uzbekistan	Did not finish						
	92	Mahdi Idhya	Morocco	Did not finish						
	94	Lorenzo Caputi	Brazil	Did not finish						
	99	José Guillermo Puello Alfonso	Dominican Republic	Did not finish						
	103	Klos Vokshi	KOS	Did not finish						
	106	Nodar Kozanashvili	Georgia	Did not finish						
	108	Mattia Beccari	San Marino	Did not finish						
	109	Irakli Argvliani	Georgia	Did not finish						
	110	Hassan Al Fardan	United Arab Emirates	Did not finish						
	112	Abdulla Kafin	United Arab Emirates	Did not finish						
	115	Vasil Veriga	Albania	Did not finish						
	38	Gauti Guðmundsson	Iceland	Disqualified						
	40	Rudolf Hozmann	Hungary	Disqualified						
	69	Amir Ali Alizadeh	Iran	Disqualified						
	97	Anthony Mrad	Lebanon	Disqualified						
	113	Artur Abrahamyan	Armenia	Disqualified						
	4	Piotr Habdas	Poland	Did not start						
