= FIS Alpine World Ski Championships 2023 – Men's parallel giant slalom =

Sports competition

FIS Alpine World Ski Championships 2023 at the Men's parallel giant slalom
- Venue: Roc de Fer
- Location: Courchevel and Méribel, France
- Dates: 14 February (qualification); 15 February
- Competitors: 46 from 23 nations

Medalists
gold medal	Alexander Schmid	Germany
silver medal	Dominik Raschner	Austria
bronze medal	Timon Haugan	Norway

The Men's parallel giant slalom competition at the FIS Alpine World Ski Championships 2023 was held at Roc de Fer ski course in Méribel on 14 and 15 February 2023.

== Qualification ==
The qualification was started on 14 February at 18:15.

Rank	Bib	Name	Country	Red course	Blue course	Notes
1	23	Rasmus Windingstad	Norway	32.68 (1)		Q
1	1	Dominik Raschner	Austria	32.68 (1)		Q
3	9	Alexander Schmid	Germany	32.69 (3)		Q
4	7	Linus Straßer	Germany	32.73 (4)		Q
5	2	Adrian Pertl	Austria		32.74 (1)	Q
6	29	Timon Haugan	Norway	32.75 (5)		Q
7	27	Alexander Steen Olsen	Norway	32.88 (6)		Q
8	5	Žan Kranjec	Slovenia	32.99 (7)		Q
9	8	Alex Vinatzer	Italy		33.05 (2)	Q
10	20	Alexis Pinturault	France		33.07 (3)	Q
11	34	Sam Maes	Belgium		33.14 (4)	Q
12	21	River Radamus	United States	33.16 (8)		Q
13	13	Gino Caviezel	Switzerland	33.17 (9)		
14	22	Luca De Aliprandini	Italy		33.18 (5)	Q
15	15	Leif Kristian Nestvold-Haugen	Norway	33.19 (10)		
16	38	Filippo Della Vite	Italy		33.29 (6)	Q
17	31	Livio Simonet	Switzerland	33.32 (11)		
18	3	Erik Read	Canada	33.32 (11)		
19	35	Adam Žampa	Slovakia	33.38 (13)		
20	25	Mathieu Faivre	France	33.38 (13)		
21	14	Mattias Rönngren	Sweden		33.38 (7)	Q
22	28	Joan Verdú	Andorra		33.60 (8)	Q
23	17	Seigo Kato	Japan	33.68 (15)		
24	33	Sebastian Holzmann	Germany	33.69 (16)		
25	18	Giovanni Borsotti	Italy		33.79 (9)	
26	45	Louis Muhlen-Schulte	Australia	33.84 (17)		
27	11	Armand Marchant	Belgium	33.98 (18)		
28	41	Samu Torsti	Finland	33.99 (19)		
29	26	Luke Winters	United States		34.01 (10)	
30	37	Brian McLaughlin	United States	34.03 (20)		
31	16	Filip Zubčić	Croatia		34.06 (11)	
32	4	Stefan Hadalin	Slovenia		34.06 (11)	
33	43	Andrej Drukarov	Lithuania	34.15 (21)		
34	24	Fabio Gstrein	Austria		34.17 (13)	
35	44	Christian Borgnaes	Denmark		34.21 (14)	
36	36	Maarten Meiners	Netherlands		34.50 (15)	
37	42	Jan Zabystřan	Czech Republic		34.65 (16)	
	46	Tiziano Gravier	Argentina		DNF	
	40	Fabian Gratz	Germany		DNF	
	32	Jeffrey Read	Canada		DNF	
	30	Harry Laidlaw	Australia		DNF	
	19	Clément Noël	France	DNF		
	12	Charlie Raposo	Great Britain		DNF	
	10	Semyel Bissig	Switzerland		DNF	
	6	Stefan Brennsteiner	Austria		DNF	
	39	Thomas Tumler	Switzerland	DSQ		

== Elimination round ==
The finals were started on 15 February at 12:00.

1/8 finals
1	(Norway) Rasmus Windingstad
16	(Andorra) Joan Verdú	+0.16
8	(Belgium) Sam Maes	+0.09
9	(Norway) Timon Haugan
5	(Germany) Alexander Schmid
12	(Italy) Filippo Della Vite	DNF
4	(Italy) Alex Vinatzer	+2.13
13	(Slovenia) Žan Kranjec
3	(Austria) Dominik Raschner
14	(Sweden) Mattias Rönngren	+0.61
6	(France) Alexis Pinturault	+0.21
11	(Norway) Alexander Steen Olsen
7	(Germany) Linus Straßer	DSQ
10	(Italy) Luca De Aliprandini
2	(Austria) Adrian Pertl
15	(United States) River Radamus	DNF

Quarterfinals
1	(Norway) Rasmus Windingstad	+0.17
9	(Norway) Timon Haugan
5	(Germany) Alexander Schmid
13	(Slovenia) Žan Kranjec	+0.18
3	(Austria) Dominik Raschner
11	(Norway) Alexander Steen Olsen	+0.55
10	(Italy) Luca De Aliprandini	+0.56
2	(Austria) Adrian Pertl

Semifinals
9	(Norway) Timon Haugan	+0.06
5	(Germany) Alexander Schmid
3	(Austria) Dominik Raschner
2	(Austria) Adrian Pertl	+0.08

Final
5	(Germany) Alexander Schmid
3	(Austria) Dominik Raschner	+0.90
Third place
9	(Norway) Timon Haugan
2	(Austria) Adrian Pertl	+0.19
