= FIS Alpine World Ski Championships 2025 – Men's giant slalom =

Men's giant slalom at the FIS Alpine World Ski Championships 2025
- Venue: Skicircus Saalbach-Hinterglemm/Leogang
- Location: Saalbach-Hinterglemm, Austria
- Dates: 13 February (qualification); 14 February
- Competitors: 99 from 60 nations
- Winning time: 2:39.71

Medalists
gold medal	Raphael Haaser	Austria
silver medal	Thomas Tumler	Switzerland
bronze medal	Loïc Meillard	Switzerland

Men's Giant Slalom
- Location: Schneekristall/Zwolfer; Saalbach, Austria
- Vertical: 450 m (1,476 ft)
- Top elevation: 1,511 m (4,957 ft)
- Base elevation: 1,061 m (3,481 ft)

The Men's giant slalom competition at the FIS Alpine World Ski Championships 2025 was held on Friday, 14 February 2025. A qualification was held on 13 February.

== Results ==
The final was started on 14 February at 09:45 and 13:15.

Rank	Bib	Name	Nation	Run 1	Rank	Run 2	Rank	Total	Diff
1st place, gold medalist(s)	22	Raphael Haaser	Austria	1:21.72	5	1:17:99	4	2:39.71	—
2nd place, silver medalist(s)	7	Thomas Tumler	Switzerland	1:21.73	6	1:18.21	8	2:39.94	+0.23
3rd place, bronze medalist(s)	2	Loïc Meillard	Switzerland	1:21.12	2	1:19.10	22	2:40.22	+0.51
4	5	Marco Odermatt	Switzerland	1:21.34	3	1:18.95	20	2:40.29	+0.58
5	9	Marco Schwarz	Austria	1:21.97	8	1:18.52	12	2:40.49	+0.78
6	8	Thibaut Favrot	France	1:22.09	10	1:18.45	10	2:40.54	+0.83
7	11	Timon Haugan	Norway	1:21.10	1	1:19.61	25	2:40.71	+1.00
8	6	Henrik Kristoffersen	Norway	1:21.98	9	1:18.75	18	2:40.73	+1.02
9	10	Luca De Aliprandini	Italy	1:21.73	6	1:19.01	21	2:40.74	+1.03
10	12	Atle Lie McGrath	Norway	1:22.26	13	1:18.67	16	2:40.93	+1.22
11	3	Žan Kranjec	Slovenia	1:22.31	14	1:18.66	15	2:40.97	+1.26
12	24	Anton Grammel	Germany	1:23.57	22	1:17.44	1	2:41.01	+1.30
13	4	Filip Zubčić	Croatia	1:22.23	12	1:18.81	19	2:41.04	+1.33
14	18	Lucas Pinheiro Braathen	Brazil	1:23.04	19	1:18.11	6	2:41.15	+1.44
15	19	Léo Anguenot	France	1:22.81	16	1:18.39	9	2:41.20	+1.49
16	16	Patrick Feurstein	Austria	1:23.09	20	1:18.20	7	2:41.29	+1.58
17	14	River Radamus	United States	1:22.12	11	1:19.24	23	2:41.36	+1.65
18	27	Fabian Gratz	Germany	1:23.01	18	1:18.65	14	2:41.66	+1.95
19	40	Bridger Gile	United States	1:23.63	23	1:18.09	5	2:41.72	+2.01
20	44	Giovanni Franzoni	Italy	1:23.85	24	1:17.88	2	2:41.73	+2.02
21	17	Alex Vinatzer	Italy	1:23.23	21	1:18.56	13	2:41.79	+2.08
22	29	Erik Read	Canada	1:24.19	30	1:17.88	2	2:42.07	+2.36
23	36	Aleix Aubert	Spain	1:24.00	26	1:18.50	11	2:42.50	+2.79
24	23	Filippo Della Vite	Italy	1:24.10	28	1:18.71	17	2:42.81	+3.10
25	21	Sam Maes	Belgium	1:22.98	17	1:20.08	27	2:43.06	+3.35
26	26	Jonas Stockinger	Germany	1:23.95	25	1:19.45	24	2:43.40	+3.69
27	41	Adam Žampa	Slovakia	1:24.11	29	1:19.65	26	2:43.76	+4.05
28	30	Andreas Žampa	Slovakia	1:24.23	32	1:20.17	28	2:44.40	+4.69
29	47	Fabian Ax Swartz	Sweden	1:24.35	33	1:20.96	30	2:45.31	+5.60
30	58	Jan Zabystřan	Czech Republic	1:25.05	38	1:20.41	29	2:45.46	+5.75
31	37	Louis Muhlen-Schulte	Australia	1:24.48	36	1:21.39	31	2:45.87	+6.16
32	33	Patrick Kenney	United States	1:24.20	31	1:21.79	33	2:45.99	+6.28
33	42	Albert Ortega	Spain	1:24.47	35	1:22.04	35	2:46.51	+6.80
34	31	Christian Borgnaes	Denmark	1:25.24	40	1:21.62	32	2:46.86	+7.15
35	45	Hayata Wakatsuki	Japan	1:25.04	37	1:21.91	34	2:46.95	+7.24
36	51	Denni Xhepa	Albania	1:26.79	45	1:22.66	37	2:49.45	+9.74
37	61	Konstantin Stoilov	Bulgaria	1:27.44	49	1:22.51	36	2:49.95	+10.24
37	50	Jack Irving	United Kingdom	1:27.04	47	1:22.91	38	2:49.95	+10.24
39	55	Tomas Barata	Spain	1:26.94	46	1:23.30	40	2:50.24	+10.53
40	65	Teo Žampa	Slovakia	1:27.30	48	1:23.86	41	2:51.16	+11.45
41	60	Calum Langmuir	United Kingdom	1:27.98	53	1:23.28	39	2:51.26	+11.55
42	48	Shin Jeong-woo	South Korea	1:27.48	50	1:23.87	42	2:51.35	+11.64
43	72	Tvrtko Ljutić	Croatia	1:27.70	51	1:24.19	43	2:51.89	+12.18
44	76	Giovanni Ongaro	Brazil	1:28.67	54	1:24.51	44	2:53.18	+13.47
45	63	Sam Hadley	New Zealand	1:29.12	55	1:26.23	46	2:55.35	+15.64
46	73	Kalin Zlatkov	Bulgaria	1:30.06	57	1:25.98	45	2:56.04	+16.33
47	71	Gleb Mosesov	Armenia	1:30.21	58	1:26.80	47	2:57.01	+17.30
48	81	Dmytro Shepiuk	Ukraine	1:30.41	59	1:26.80	47	2:57.21	+17.50
49	79	Matthieu Osch	Luxembourg	1:30.62	60	1:28.87	49	2:59.49	+19.78
	1	Alexander Steen Olsen	Norway	1:21.55	4	Did not finish			
	13	Joan Verdú	Andorra	1:22.43	15	Did not finish			
	39	Eduard Hallberg	Finland	1:24.00	26	Did not finish			
	28	William Hansson	Sweden	1:24.44	34	Did not finish			
	32	Tiziano Gravier	Argentina	1:25.21	39	Did not finish			
	43	Kryštof Krýzl	Czech Republic	1:26.21	42	Did not finish			
	53	Aingeru Garay	Spain	1:26.53	43	Did not finish			
	49	Piotr Habdas	Poland	1:26.73	44	Did not finish			
	57	Balint Ury	Hungary	1:27.91	52	Did not finish			
	68	William Petanjko	Croatia	1:29.72	56	Did not finish			
	34	Isaiah Nelson	United States	1:26.14	41	Did not start			
	84	Mathieu Neumuller	Madagascar	1:30.87	61	Did not qualify			
	78	Dino Terzić	Bosnia and Herzegovina	1:32.56	62	Did not qualify			
	77	Elvis Opmanis	Latvia	1:32.77	63	Did not qualify			
	89	Luka Buchukuri	Georgia	1:33.47	64	Did not qualify			
	86	Cormac Comerford	Ireland	1:33.66	65	Did not qualify			
	83	Viktor Petkov	North Macedonia	1:36.68	66	Did not qualify			
	92	Mackenson Florindo	Haiti	1:37.77	67	Did not qualify			
	97	Faiz Basha	Singapore	1:37.86	68	Did not qualify			
	85	Nikita Gorkovskiy	Uzbekistan	1:38.06	69	Did not qualify			
	91	Alessandro Cantele Fink	Mexico	1:38.07	70	Did not qualify			
	90	Timur Shakirov	Kyrgyzstan	1:38.39	71	Did not qualify			
	99	Yianno Kouyoumdjan	Cyprus	1:39.07	72	Did not qualify			
	93	Branislav Peković	Montenegro	1:39.74	73	Did not qualify			
	96	Idris Janik	Morocco	1:39.84	74	Did not qualify			
	100	Isaac Lee	Hong Kong	1:40.32	75	Did not qualify			
	95	Matteo Giannini	San Marino	1:41.12	76	Did not qualify			
	98	Drink Kokaj	Kosovo	1:44.35	77	Did not qualify			
	15	Stefan Brennsteiner	Austria	Did not finish					
	20	Luca Aerni	Switzerland	Did not finish					
	25	Tormis Laine	Estonia	Did not finish					
	35	Andrej Drukarov	Lithuania	Did not finish					
	38	Seigo Kato	Japan	Did not finish					
	46	Jan Koula	Czech Republic	Did not finish					
	52	Hugh McAdam	Australia	Did not finish					
	54	Dominic Shackleton	United Kingdom	Did not finish					
	56	Miha Oserban	Slovenia	Did not finish					
	59	Hong Dong-kwan	South Korea	Did not finish					
	62	Owen Vinter	United Kingdom	Did not finish					
	64	Benjamin Szőllős	Israel	Did not finish					
	66	Jón Erik Sigurðsson	Iceland	Did not finish					
	67	Ioannis Antoniou	Greece	Did not finish					
	69	Aldo Tomašek	Czech Republic	Did not finish					
	70	Tobias Hansen	Iceland	Did not finish					
	74	Jurre Jeurissen	Netherlands	Did not finish					
	75	Manuel Horwitz	Chile	Did not finish					
	80	Aleksa Tomović	Serbia	Did not finish					
	82	Alexandru Ștefan Ștefănescu	Romania	Did not finish					
	88	Corentin Gatignol	Portugal	Did not finish					
	94	Mohammad Saveh-Shemshaki	Iran	Did not finish					
	87	Fayik Abdi	Saudi Arabia	Did not start					
