= Alpine skiing at the 2026 Winter Olympics – Men's downhill =

Men's downhill at the XXV Olympic Winter Games
- Venue: Stelvio, Bormio
- Date: 7 February 2026
- Winning time: 1:51.61

Medalists
1st place, gold medalist(s)		Franjo von Allmen	Switzerland
2nd place, silver medalist(s)		Giovanni Franzoni	Italy
3rd place, bronze medalist(s)		Dominik Paris	Italy

Men's Downhill
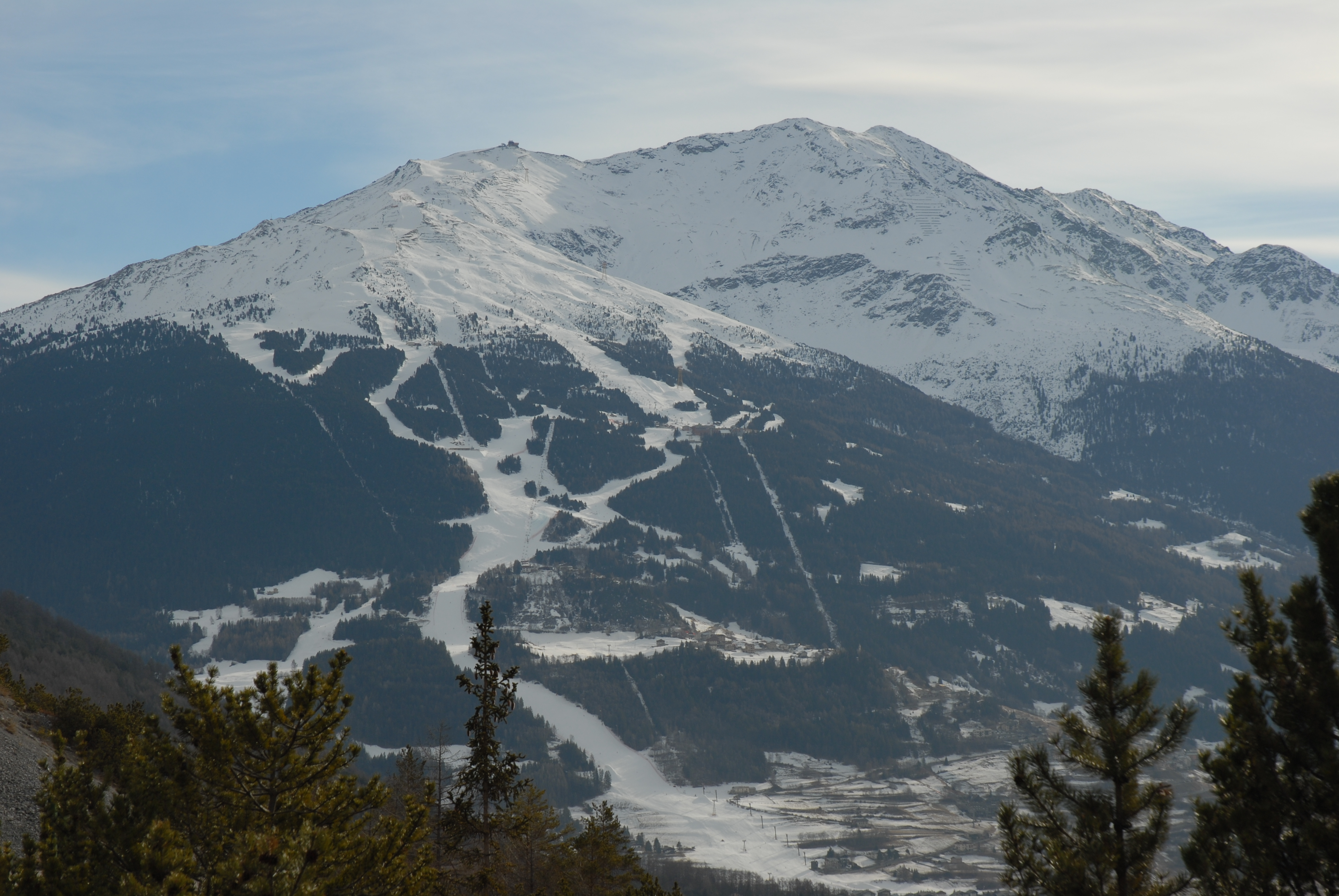
- Location: Stelvio Ski Centre
- Vertical: 1,023 m (3,356 ft)
- Top elevation: 2,268 m (7,441 ft) AMSL
- Base elevation: 1,245 m (4,085 ft)
- Longest run: 3.442 km (2.14 mi)

The men's downhill competition of the 2026 Winter Olympics was held on Saturday, 7 February, at Stelvio Ski Centre in Bormio, and was the first medal event of these Olympics. Franjo von Allmen of Switzerland won the event, Italian Giovanni Franzoni won the silver medal, and teammate Dominik Paris took bronze. All three were first-time Olympic medalists.

The Stelvio course was 3,442 metres (2.14 mi) in length, with a vertical drop of 1,023 m (3,356 ft) from a starting elevation of 2,268 m (7,441 ft) above sea level. Gold medalist von Allmen's time of 111.61 seconds yielded an average speed of 111.022 km/h (69.0 mph) and an average vertical descent rate of 9.166 m/s (30.1 ft/s).

== Background ==
All three medalists of 2022 had retired from international competition: champion Beat Feuz, runner-up Johan Clarey, and bronze medalist Matthias Mayer. Prior to the Olympics on the World Cup circuit, Marco Odermatt led in the overall and downhill standings, having won three of the six downhills. Franjo von Allmen was the reigning world champion. The Stelvio course is a regular stop on the World Cup circuit, with men's speed events usually held in late December.

== Qualification ==
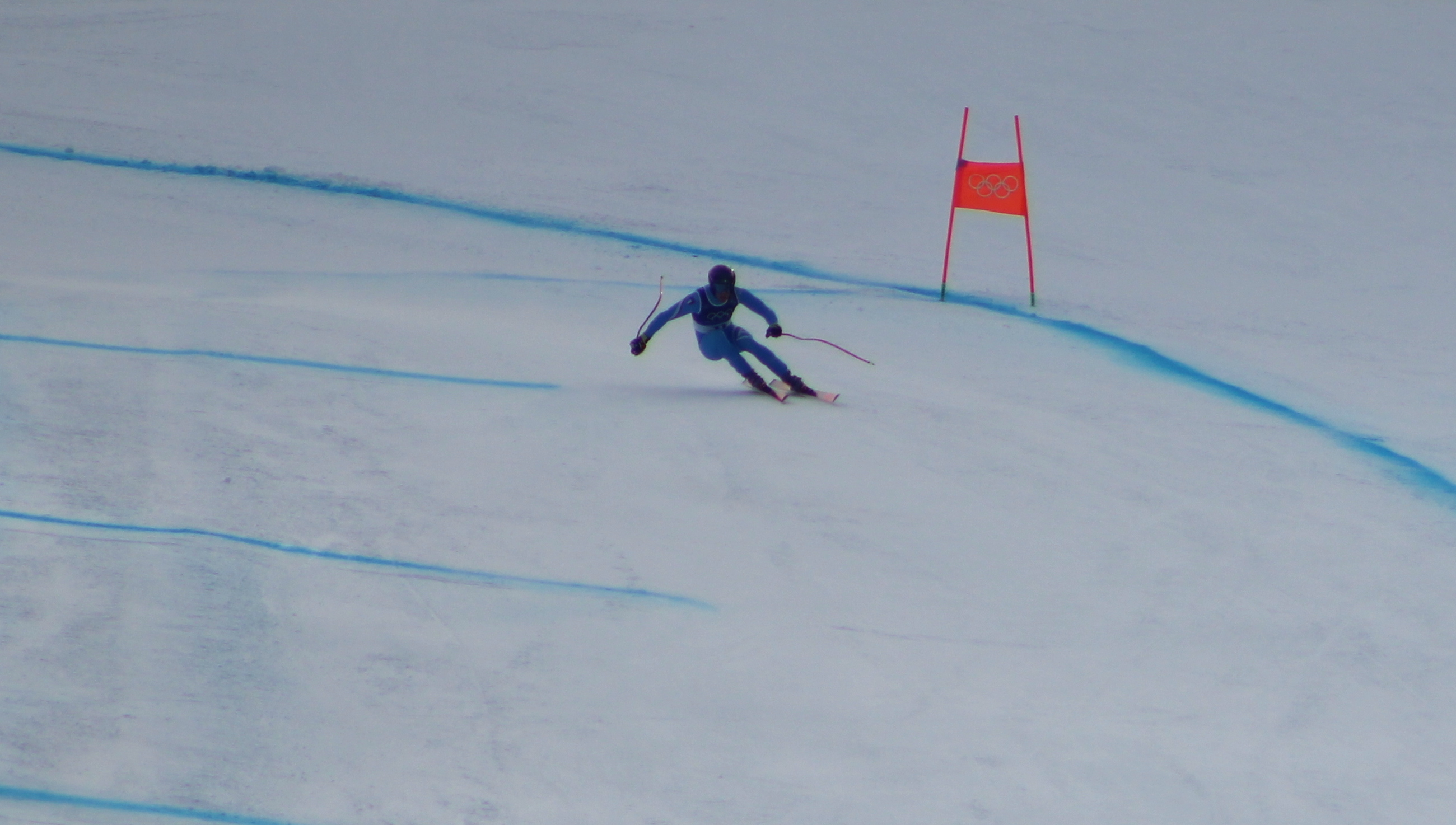
Giovanni Franzoni

== Results ==
The race started at 11:30 local time (UTC+1) under partly cloudy skies. The air temperature was −3.3 °C (26 °F) at the starting gate and 1.3 °C (34 °F) at the finish area; the snow condition was hard.

Rank	Bib	Name	Country	Time	Behind
1st place, gold medalist(s)	8	Franjo von Allmen	Switzerland	1:51.61	—
2nd place, silver medalist(s)	11	Giovanni Franzoni	Italy	1:51.81	+0.20
3rd place, bronze medalist(s)	12	Dominik Paris	Italy	1:52.11	+0.50
4	7	Marco Odermatt	Switzerland	1:52.31	+0.70
5	6	Alexis Monney	Switzerland	1:52.36	+0.75
6	9	Vincent Kriechmayr	Austria	1:52.38	+0.77
7	1	Daniel Hemetsberger	Austria	1:52.58	+0.97
8	10	Nils Allègre	France	1:52.80	+1.19
9	2	James Crawford	Canada	1:53.00	+1.39
10	27	Kyle Negomir	United States	1:53.20	+1.59
11	14	Mattia Casse	Italy	1:53.28	+1.67
12	19	Miha Hrobat	Slovenia	1:53.30	+1.69
13	3	Bryce Bennett	United States	1:53.45	+1.84
14	17	Cameron Alexander	Canada	1:53.49	+1.88
15	21	Raphael Haaser	Austria	1:53.50	+1.89
16	30	Martin Čater	Slovenia	1:53.51	+1.90
17	15	Florian Schieder	Italy	1:53.57	+1.96
18	13	Ryan Cochran-Siegle	United States	1:53.63	+2.02
19	29	Sam Morse	United States	1:53.68	+2.07
20	18	Elian Lehto	Finland	1:53.83	+2.22
21	28	Simon Jocher	Germany	1:54.01	+2.40
22	5	Nils Alphand	France	1:54.06	+2.45
23	20	Stefan Rogentin	Switzerland	1:54.18	+2.57
24	23	Jan Zabystřan	Czech Republic	1:54.39	+2.78
25	26	Jeffrey Read	Canada	1:54.56	+2.95
26	25	Stefan Babinsky	Austria	1:54.73	+3.12
27	24	Alban Elezi Cannaferina	France	1:54.90	+3.29
28	22	Brodie Seger	Canada	1:54.96	+3.35
29	31	Marco Pfiffner	Liechtenstein	1:55.66	+4.05
30	32	Barnabás Szőllős	Israel	1:57.03	+5.47
31	33	Arnaud Alessandria	Monaco	1:57.15	+5.59
32	34	Elvis Opmanis	Latvia	1:59.24	+7.68
33	35	Dmytro Shepiuk	Ukraine	2:00.11	+8.55
34	36	Cormac Comerford	Ireland	2:04.40	+12.79
	4	Maxence Muzaton	France	Did not finish	
	16	Adrian Smiseth Sejersted	Norway	Did not finish	
