= FIS Alpine World Ski Championships 2023 – Men's super-G =

FIS Alpine World Ski Championships 2023 at the Men's super-G
- Venue: L'Éclipse
- Location: Courchevel, France
- Dates: 9 February
- Competitors: 56 from 23 nations
- Winning time: 1:07.22

Medalists
gold medal	James Crawford	Canada
silver medal	Aleksander Aamodt Kilde	Norway
bronze medal	Alexis Pinturault	France

Men's Super-G
- Location: L'Éclipse; Courchevel, France
- Vertical: 590 m (1,936 ft)
- Top elevation: 1,880 m (6,168 ft)
- Base elevation: 1,290 m (4,232 ft)
- Longest run: 1.857 km (1.15 mi)

The Men's super-G competition at the FIS Alpine World Ski Championships 2023 was held at L'Éclipse ski course in Courchevel on 9 February 2023.

== Results ==
The race was started at 11:30 CET.

Rank	Bib	Name	Country	Time	Diff
1st place, gold medalist(s)	10	James Crawford	Canada	1:07.22	—
2nd place, silver medalist(s)	9	Aleksander Aamodt Kilde	Norway	1:07.23	+0.01
3rd place, bronze medalist(s)	8	Alexis Pinturault	France	1:07.48	+0.26
4	7	Marco Odermatt	Switzerland	1:07.59	+0.37
5	14	Raphael Haaser	Austria	1:07.80	+0.58
6	21	Marco Schwarz	Austria	1:07.81	+0.59
7	16	Adrian Smiseth Sejersted	Norway	1:07.84	+0.62
8	2	Loïc Meillard	Switzerland	1:07.87	+0.65
9	23	Brodie Seger	Canada	1:07.89	+0.67
9	12	Andreas Sander	Germany	1:07.89	+0.67
11	20	Jeffrey Read	Canada	1:07.92	+0.70
12	13	Vincent Kriechmayr	Austria	1:08.09	+0.87
13	3	Mattia Casse	Italy	1:08.32	+1.10
14	17	Daniel Hemetsberger	Austria	1:08.39	+1.17
15	18	Stefan Babinsky	Austria	1:08.50	+1.28
16	34	River Radamus	United States	1:08.52	+1.30
17	33	Kyle Negomir	United States	1:08.70	+1.48
18	19	Ryan Cochran-Siegle	United States	1:08.74	+1.52
19	11	Stefan Rogentin	Switzerland	1:08.78	+1.56
20	30	Christof Innerhofer	Italy	1:08.79	+1.57
21	5	Nils Allègre	France	1:08.83	+1.61
22	32	Elian Lehto	Finland	1:08.87	+1.65
23	4	Blaise Giezendanner	France	1:08.88	+1.66
24	31	Henrik von Appen	Chile	1:08.90	+1.68
25	40	Rok Ažnoh	Slovenia	1:08.95	+1.73
26	28	Guglielmo Bosca	Italy	1:08.96	+1.74
27	1	Romed Baumann	Germany	1:09.10	+1.88
28	35	Miha Hrobat	Slovenia	1:09.15	+1.93
29	27	Simon Jocher	Germany	1:09.18	+1.96
30	26	Travis Ganong	United States	1:09.36	+2.14
31	37	Nejc Naraločnik	Slovenia	1:09.46	+2.24
32	41	Nico Gauer	Liechtenstein	1:09.80	+2.58
33	39	Albert Ortega	Spain	1:10.06	+2.84
34	43	Barnabás Szőllős	Israel	1:10.07	+2.85
35	38	Marco Pfiffner	Liechtenstein	1:10.25	+3.03
36	47	Jaakko Tapanainen	Finland	1:10.39	+3.17
37	52	Juhan Luik	Estonia	1:10.83	+3.61
38	56	Calum Langmuir	Great Britain	1:10.89	+3.67
39	46	Christian Borgnæs	Denmark	1:11.03	+3.81
40	48	Tiziano Gravier	Argentina	1:11.18	+3.96
41	45	Owen Vinter	Great Britain	1:11.78	+4.56
42	49	Elvis Opmanis	Latvia	1:11.88	+4.66
43	55	Ivan Kovbasnyuk	Ukraine	1:13.16	+5.94
44	54	Lauris Opmanis	Latvia	1:13.64	+6.42
45	53	Benjamin Szőllős	Israel	1:14.60	+7.38
46	51	Márton Kékesi	Hungary	1:15.52	+8.30
	6	Dominik Paris	Italy	Did not finish	
	15	Gino Caviezel	Switzerland	Did not finish	
	22	Atle Lie McGrath	Norway	Did not finish	
	24	Broderick Thompson	Canada	Did not finish	
	25	Martin Čater	Slovenia	Did not finish	
	29	Josef Ferstl	Germany	Did not finish	
	36	Jan Zabystřan	Czech Republic	Did not finish	
	42	Sven von Appen	Chile	Did not finish	
	44	Roy-Alexander Steudle	Great Britain	Did not finish	
	50	Arnaud Alessandria	Monaco	Did not finish	
