= FIS Alpine World Ski Championships 2023 – Nations team event =

FIS Alpine World Ski Championships 2023
- Venue: Roc de Fer
- Location: Méribel, France
- Dates: 14 February
- Competitors: 67 from 16 nations
- Teams: 16

Medalists
gold medal	Tommy Ford; Katie Hensien; Paula Moltzan; Nina O'Brien; River Radamus; Luke Winters	United States
silver medal	Timon Haugan; Kristin Lysdahl; Leif Kristian Nestvold-Haugen; Alexander Steen Olsen; Thea Louise Stjernesund; Maria Therese Tviberg	Norway
bronze medal	Valérie Grenier; Erik Read; Jeffrey Read; Britt Richardson	Canada

The Nations team event competition at the FIS Alpine World Ski Championships 2023 was held at Roc de Fer ski course in Méribel on 14 February 2023.

== FIS Overall Nations Cup standings ==
The participating nations were seeded according to the overall Nations Cup standings prior to the World Championships.

Teams marked in green participated.

Rank	Country	Points
1	Switzerland	8211
2	Austria	6394
3	Norway	5107
4	Italy	4634
5	United States	3380
6	France	2908
7	Germany	2286
8	Canada	1572
9	Slovenia	1382
10	Sweden	1373
11	Slovakia	986
12	Croatia	719
13	Great Britain	198
13	New Zealand	198
15	Poland	138
16	Czech Republic	129
17	Bulgaria	100
18	Greece	91
19	Belgium	83
20	Andorra	69
21	Albania	59
22	Spain	47
23	Chile	38
24	Finland	22
25	Japan	14
26	Bosnia and Herzegovina	6
27	Liechtenstein	4
—	Denmark	0
—	Latvia	0

== Bracket ==
Round of 16
Switzerland	4
Latvia	0
Canada	4
Slovenia	0
United States	2
Poland	2
Italy	2
Czech Republic	2
Norway	4
Belgium	0
France	4
Slovakia	0
Germany	3
Sweden	1
Austria	4
Denmark	0

Quarterfinals
Switzerland	2
Canada	2
United States	3
Italy	1
Norway	3
France	1
Germany	1
Austria	3

Semifinals
Canada	1
United States	3
Norway	3
Austria	1

Final
United States	3
Norway	2
Third place
Canada	2
Austria	2
