= FIS Alpine World Ski Championships 2023 – Men's downhill =

Men's downhill at the FIS Alpine World Ski Championships 2023
- Venue: L'Éclipse
- Location: Courchevel, France
- Dates: 12 February
- Competitors: 45 from 17 nations
- Winning time: 1:47.05

Medalists
gold medal	Marco Odermatt	Switzerland
silver medal	Aleksander Aamodt Kilde	Norway
bronze medal	Cameron Alexander	Canada

Men's Downhill
- Location: L'Éclipse; Courchevel, France
- Vertical: 945 m (3,100 ft)
- Top elevation: 2,235 m (7,333 ft)
- Base elevation: 1,290 m (4,232 ft)
- Longest run: 3.100 km (1.93 mi)

The men's downhill competition at the FIS Alpine World Ski Championships 2023 was held at L'Éclipse ski course in Courchevel, France, on Sunday, 12 February.

Switzerland's Marco Odermatt won the gold medal, Aleksander Aamodt Kilde of Norway took the silver, and the bronze medalist was Cameron Alexander of Canada.

The race course was 3.100 km (1.93 mi) in length, with a vertical drop of 945 m (3,100 ft) from a starting elevation of 2,235 m (7,333 ft) above sea level. Odermatt's winning time of 107.05 seconds yielded an average speed of 104.250 km/h (64.8 mph) and an average vertical descent rate of 8.828 m/s (29.0 ft/s).

== Results ==
The race started at 11:00 CET (UTC+1) under clear skies. The air temperature was 2 °C (36 °F) at the starting gate and 2 °C (36 °F) at the finish.

Rank	Bib	Name	Country	Time	Diff
1st place, gold medalist(s)	10	Marco Odermatt	Switzerland	1:47.05	—
2nd place, silver medalist(s)	15	Aleksander Aamodt Kilde	Norway	1:47.53	+0.48
3rd place, bronze medalist(s)	20	Cameron Alexander	Canada	1:47.94	+0.89
4	21	Marco Schwarz	Austria	1:47.98	+0.93
5	12	James Crawford	Canada	1:48.06	+1.01
6	24	Maxence Muzaton	France	1:48.13	+1.08
7	1	Florian Schieder	Italy	1:48.14	+1.09
8	28	Miha Hrobat	Slovenia	1:48.18	+1.13
8	14	Dominik Paris	Italy	1:48.18	+1.13
10	16	Thomas Dressen	Germany	1:48.20	+1.15
11	6	Vincent Kriechmayr	Austria	1:48.21	+1.16
12	9	Niels Hintermann	Switzerland	1:48.28	+1.23
12	23	Justin Murisier	Switzerland	1:48.28	+1.23
14	7	Daniel Hemetsberger	Austria	1:48.33	+1.28
15	19	Matteo Marsaglia	Italy	1:48.58	+1.53
16	3	Adrian Smiseth Sejersted	Norway	1:48.63	+1.58
17	31	Erik Arvidsson	United States	1:48.66	+1.61
18	29	Alexis Monney	Switzerland	1:48.80	+1.75
19	4	Romed Baumann	Germany	1:48.85	+1.80
20	11	Mattia Casse	Italy	1:48.88	+1.83
21	30	Nils Allègre	France	1:48.92	+1.87
22	34	Henrik von Appen	Chile	1:48.93	+1.88
23	8	Johan Clarey	France	1:48.94	+1.89
24	2	Ryan Cochran-Siegle	United States	1:48.95	+1.90
25	33	Elian Lehto	Finland	1:48.97	+1.92
26	18	Jared Goldberg	United States	1:49.03	+1.98
27	17	Josef Ferstl	Germany	1:49.12	+2.07
28	13	Travis Ganong	United States	1:49.25	+2.20
29	27	Andreas Sander	Germany	1:49.45	+2.40
30	38	Nejc Naraločnik	Slovenia	1:49.62	+2.57
31	32	Jeffrey Read	Canada	1:49.50	+2.65
32	35	Stefan Babinsky	Austria	1:49.74	+2.69
33	36	Marco Pfiffner	Liechtenstein	1:50.50	+3.45
34	22	Adrien Theaux	France	1:50.51	+3.46
35	25	Martin Čater	Slovenia	1:51.03	+3.98
36	41	Jaakko Tapanainen	Finland	1:51.41	+4.36
37	40	Barnabás Szőllős	Israel	1:51.48	+4.43
38	44	Juhan Luik	Estonia	1:52.74	+5.69
39	39	Roy-Alexander Steudle	Great Britain	1:52.76	+5.71
40	42	Ivan Kovbasnyuk	Ukraine	1:54.04	+6.99
41	45	Lauris Opmanis	Latvia	1:54.45	+7.40
	5	Otmar Striedinger	Austria	Did not finish	
	26	Brodie Seger	Canada	Did not finish	
	37	Nico Gauer	Liechtenstein	Did not finish	
	43	Elvis Opmanis	Latvia	Did not finish	
