= Juan del Campo (skier) =

Spanish alpine skier (born 1994)

Personal information
- Born: 28 June 1994 (age 32)

Skiing career
- Sport: Alpine skiing ♂
- Club: Euro-Ski Club; Deportes de Invierno
- Disciplines: Slalom, giant slalom
- World Cup debut: October 2015 (age 21)

Olympics
- Teams: 1 – (2018)
- Medals: 0

World Championships
- Teams: 4 – (2017–2023)
- Medals: 0

World Cup
- Podiums: 0
- Overall titles: 0 – (145th in 2022)
- Discipline titles: 0 – (55th in SL, 2022)
Medal record
Men's alpine skiing
Representing Spain

Juan del Campo Hernández (born 28 June 1994 in Bilbao) is a Spanish World Cup alpine ski racer.

He competed at the 2018 Winter Olympics in Pyeongchang, South Korea, in the giant slalom and slalom, and in four World Championships.

== World Cup results ==
=== Season standings ===
Season	Age	Overall	Slalom	Giant slalom	Super-G	Downhill	Combined	Parallel
2022	27	145	55	—	—	—	—N/a	—
2023	28	140	50	—	—	—	—N/a	—N/a

Standings through 20 February 2023

=== Results per discipline ===
Discipline	WC starts	WC Top 30	WC Top 15	WC Top 5	WC Podium	Best result		
Discipline	WC starts	WC Top 30	WC Top 15	WC Top 5	WC Podium	Date	Location	Place
Slalom	39	3	0	0	0	24 January 2023	Schladming, Austria	22nd
Giant slalom	4	0	0	0	0	3 March 2018	Kranjska Gora, Slovenia	39th
Super-G	0	0	0	0	0			
Downhill	0	0	0	0	0			
Combined	0	0	0	0	0			
Total	43	3	0	0	0			

Standings through 20 February 2023

== World Championship results ==
Year
Year	Age	Slalom	Giant; Slalom	Super G	Downhill	Combined	Team Event
2017	22	DNF1	35	—	—	—	—
2019	24	27	33	—	—	—	—
2021	26	DNF1	—	—	—	—	—
2023	28	21	—	—	—	—	—

== Olympic results ==
Year
Year	Age	Slalom	Giant; Slalom	Super G	Downhill	Combined
2018	23	DNF1	DNF2	—	—	—
