= Alexander Schmid =

German alpine skier (born 1994)

Personal information
- Born: 9 June 1994 (age 32) Oberstdorf, Germany
- Height: 1.78 m (5 ft 10 in)

Skiing career
- Sport: Alpine skiing
- Club: SC Fischen
- Disciplines: Giant slalom, slalom
- World Cup debut: 26 October 2014 (age 20)

Olympics
- Teams: 3 – (2018, 2022, 2026)
- Medals: 1 (0 gold)

World Championships
- Teams: 3 − (2019–2023)
- Medals: 2 (1 gold)

World Cup
- Seasons: 12 − (2015–2026)
- Wins: 0
- Podiums: 3 − (1 GS, 2 PG)
- Overall titles: 0 – (33rd in 2021)
- Discipline titles: 0 – (3rd in PG, 2021)
Medal record
Men's alpine skiing
Representing Germany
Olympic Games
Silver medal – second place	2022 Beijing	Team event
World Championships
Gold medal – first place	2023 Méribel	Parallel
Bronze medal – third place	2021 Cortina d’Ampezzo	Team event
Junior World Championships
Bronze medal – third place	2015 Hafjell	Team event

Alexander Schmid (born 9 June 1994) is a German World Cup alpine ski racer and 2023 World champion in parallel giant slalom. His older brother is another alpine skier Manuel Schmid, who specialised in the speed disciplines.

== Career ==
Alexander specializes in giant slalom. Born in Oberstdorf, Bavaria, he has competed in two Winter Olympics and three World Championships. Alexander won gold in parallel giant slalom at 2023 World Ski Championships by holding off Austria's Dominik Raschner by .50 seconds.

== World Cup results ==
=== Season standings ===
Season
Season	Age	Overall	Slalom	Giant slalom	Super-G	Downhill	Combined	Parallel
2018	23	66	—	20	—	—	—	—N/a
2019	24	81	—	24	—	—	—	—N/a
2020	25	44	—	19	—	—	—	5
2021	26	33	—	16	—	—	—N/a	3rd place, bronze medalist(s)
2022	27	39	44	12	—	—	—N/a	14
2023	28	46	—	14	—	—	—N/a	—N/a
2024	28	45	—	15	—	—	—N/a	—N/a
2025	29	90	—	25	—	—	—N/a	—N/a
2026	30	84	—	27	—	—	—N/a	—N/a

=== Race podiums ===
- 0 wins
- 3 podiums – (1 GS, 2 PG); 16 top tens

Season
Season	Date	Location	Discipline	Place
2020	9 February 2020	Chamonix, France	Parallel-G	3rd
2021	27 November 2020	Lech/Zürs, Austria	Parallel-G	3rd
2022	20 December 2021	Alta Badia, Italy	Giant slalom	3rd

== World Championship results ==
Year
Year	Age	Slalom	Giant slalom	Super-G	Downhill	Combined	Parallel	Team event
2019	24	—	8	—	—	—	—N/a	—
2021	26	—	DNF2	—	—	—	4	3
2023	28	DNF1	15	—	—	—	1	6

== Olympic results ==
Year
Year	Age	Slalom	Giant slalom	Super-G	Downhill	Combined	Team combined	Team event
2018	23	—	DNF1	—	—	—	—N/a	5
2022	27	19	DNF1	—	—	—	—N/a	2
2026	31	—	13	—	—	—N/a	—	—N/a
