= Stefan Brennsteiner =

Austrian alpine skier (born 1991)

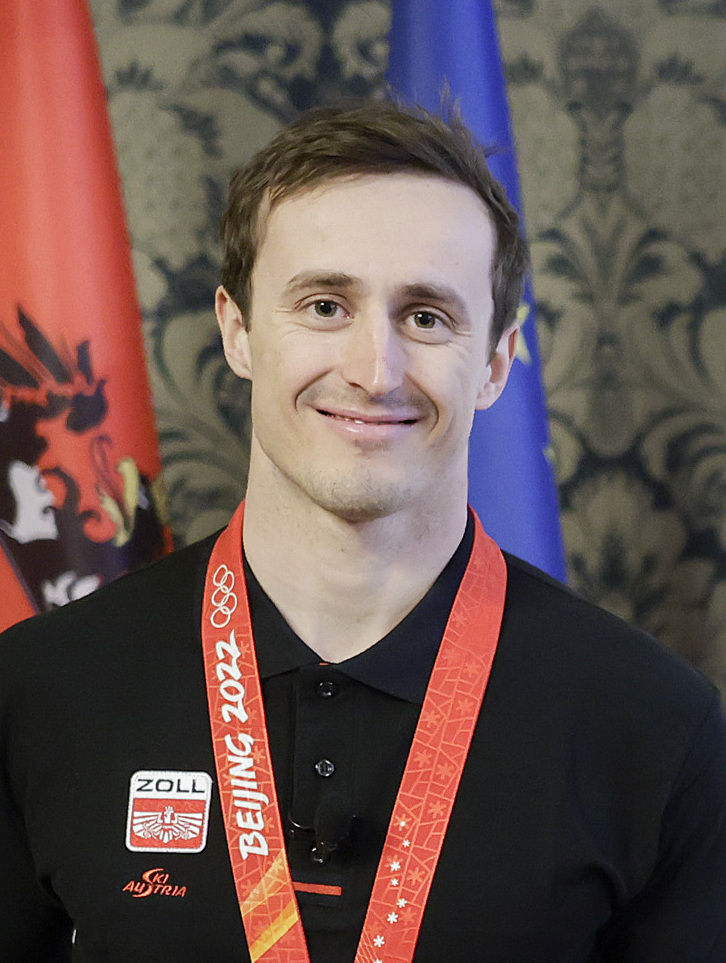
- Brennsteiner in 2022

Personal information
- Born: 3 October 1991 (age 34) Zell am See, Salzburg, Austria
- Height: 1.84 m (6 ft 0 in)

Skiing career
- Country: Austria
- Sport: Alpine skiing
- Club: USK Niedernsill – Salzburg
- Disciplines: Giant slalom
- World Cup debut: 28 October 2012 (age 21)

Olympics
- Teams: 3 – (2018, 2022, 2026)
- Medals: 1 (1 gold)

World Championships
- Teams: 4 – (2019–2025)
- Medals: 0

World Cup
- Seasons: 14 − (2013–2026)
- Wins: 1 − (1 GS)
- Podiums: 7 − (7 GS)
- Overall titles: 0 – (16th in 2026)
- Discipline titles: 0 – (4th in GS, 2026)
Medal record
Men's alpine skiing
Representing Austria
Olympic Games
Gold medal – first place	2022 Beijing	Team event

Stefan Brennsteiner (born 3 October 1991) is an Austrian World Cup alpine ski racer, and specializes in giant slalom. He has competed in three Winter Olympics and four World Championships, winning a gold medal in the team event at the 2022 Winter Olympics.

Brennsteiner made his World Cup debut at age 21 in October 2012 at Sölden, Austria, and reached his first podium in February 2021 at Bansko, Bulgaria.

== Career ==
Brennsteiner began competing as a junior in December 2006. His first win came in 2010, in the giant slalom at the Austrian National Junior Race. He represented Austria in the giant slalom at the 2018 Winter Olympics, however, failed to finish his second run.

Brennsteiner achieved his first World Cup podium in February 2021 in Bansko; after finishing his first run in fifth position, he moved ahead of Alexis Pinturault and Henrik Kristoffersen after his second run, finishing in third position. A month later, he finished in third position at Kranjska Gora, 0.03 seconds behind Loïc Meillard.

Brennsteiner once again represented Austria in the 2022 Winter Olympics. He competed in the mixed team event, in which Austria won the gold medal, Brennsteiner beating Julian Rauchfuss in his final heat. He also competed in the giant slalom, recording the second-fastest time on his first run, however a mistake in his second run caused him to lose his medal position.

In March 2022, Brennsteiner finished in second place in Kranjska Gora, the first time he had finished above third. He recorded the fastest time of the field in his first run; however, he fell behind Henrik Kristoffersen on his second run.

== World Cup results ==
=== Season standings ===
Season
Season	Age	Overall	Slalom	Giant slalom	Super-G	Downhill	Combined	Parallel
2014	22	129	—	46	—	—	—	—N/a
2015	23	no World Cup points						—N/a
2016	24	149	—	53	—	—	—	—N/a
2017	25	injured in October 2016						—N/a
2018	26	80	—	25	—	—	—	—N/a
2019	27	97	—	29	—	—	—	—N/a
2020	28	120	—	34	—	—	—	—
2021	29	28	—	6	—	—	—N/a	—
2022	30	25	—	7	—	—	—N/a	11
2023	31	39	—	11	—	—	—N/a	—N/a
2024	32	45	—	14	—	—	—N/a	—N/a
2025	33	30	—	7	—	—	—N/a	—N/a
2026	34	16	—	4	—	—	—N/a	—N/a

=== Race podiums ===
- 1 win - (1 GS)
- 7 podiums - (7 GS); 31 top tens

Season
Season	Date	Location	Discipline	Place
2021	27 February 2021	Bansko, Bulgaria	Giant slalom	3rd
2021	13 March 2021	Kranjska Gora, Slovenia	Giant slalom	3rd
2022	13 March 2022	Kranjska Gora, Slovenia	Giant slalom	2nd
2025	15 December 2024	Val d'Isère, France	Giant slalom	3rd
2026	28 November 2025	Copper Mountain, United States	Giant slalom	1st
2026	21 December 2025	Alta Badia, Italy	Giant slalom	3rd
2026	7 March 2026	Kranjska Gora, Slovenia	Giant slalom	3rd

== World Championship results ==
Year
Year	Age	Slalom	Giant slalom	Super-G	Downhill	Combined	Team combined	Parallel	Team event
2019	27	—	9	—	—	—	—N/a	—N/a	—
2021	29	—	DNF2	—	—	—	—N/a	—	—
2023	31	—	4	—	—	—	—N/a	—	4
2025	33	—	DNF1	—	—	—N/a	—	—N/a	6

== Olympic results ==
Year
Year	Age	Slalom	Giant slalom	Super-G	Downhill	Combined	Team combined	Team event
2018	26	—	DNF2	—	—	—	—N/a	—
2022	30	—	27	—	—	—	—N/a	1
2026	34	—	8	—	—	—N/a	—	—N/a
