= Daniel Hemetsberger =

Austrian alpine skier (born 1991)

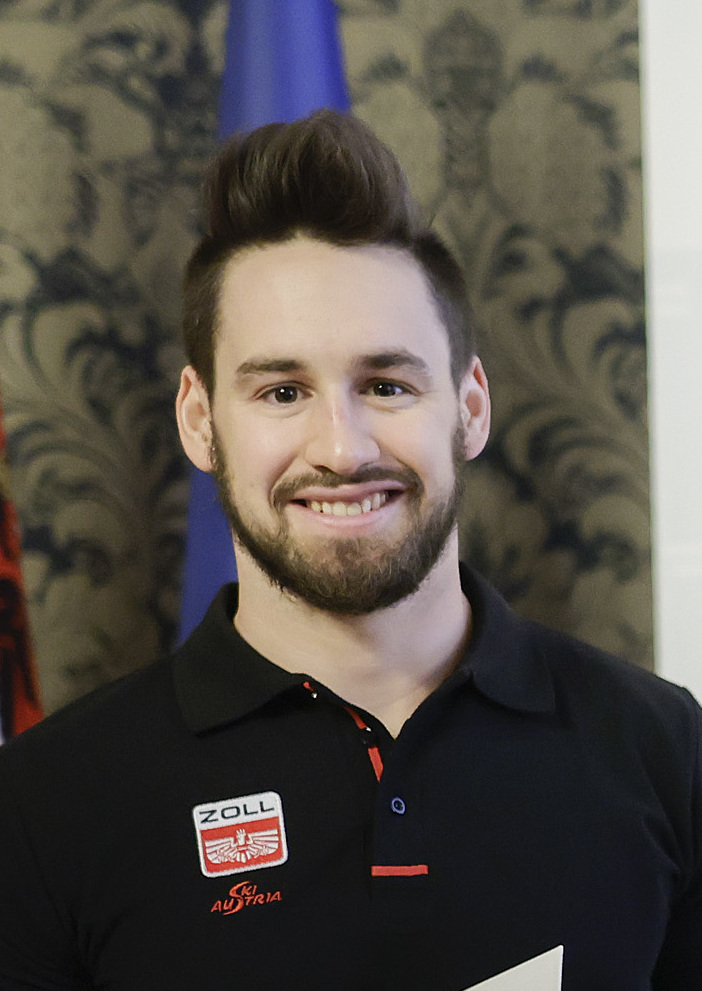
- Hemetsberger in 2022

Personal information
- Born: 23 May 1991 (age 35) Vöcklabruck, Upper Austria, Austria

Skiing career
- Country: Austria
- Sport: Alpine skiing
- Club: SV Unterrach - Oberoesterreich
- Disciplines: Downhill, Super-G
- World Cup debut: 20 January 2018 (age 26)

Olympics
- Teams: 2 – (2022, 2026)
- Medals: 0

World Championships
- Teams: 2 – (2023, 2025)
- Medals: 0

World Cup
- Seasons: 9 – (2018–2026)
- Wins: 0
- Podiums: 4 – (2 DH, 2 SG)
- Overall titles: 0 – (16th in 2023)
- Discipline titles: 0 – (8th in DH, 2022)
Medal record
Men's alpine skiing
Representing Austria
World Cup race podiums
Event	1st	2nd	3rd
Super-G	0	1	1
Downhill	0	1	1
Total	0	2	2

Daniel Hemetsberger (born 23 May 1991) is an Austrian World Cup alpine ski racer who specializes in downhill. He achieved his first podium in January 2022, finishing third in a downhill at Kitzbühel.

== World Cup results ==
=== Season standings ===
Season
Season	Age	Overall	Slalom	Giant slalom	Super-G	Downhill	Combined
2020	28	133	—	—	—	46	—
2021	29	64	—	—	32	22	—N/a
2022	30	18	—	—	—	8	—N/a
2023	31	16	—	—	8	9	—N/a
2024	32	59	—	—	21	43	—N/a
2025	33	43	—	—	23	17	—N/a
2026	34	26	—	—	17	12	—N/a

=== Race podiums ===
- 0 wins
- 4 podiums (2 DH, 2 SG); 22 top tens

Season
Season	Date	Location	Discipline	Place
2022	23 January 2022	Kitzbühel, Austria	Downhill	3rd
2023	26 November 2022	Lake Louise, Canada	Downhill	2nd
2023	29 January 2023	Cortina d'Ampezzo, Italy	Super-G	3rd
2024	15 December 2023	Val Gardena, Italy	Super-G	2nd

== World Championship results ==
Year
Year	Age	Slalom	Giant slalom	Super-G	Downhill	Combined	Team combined
2023	31	—	—	14	14	—	—N/a
2025	33	—	—	—	7	—N/a	5

== Olympic results ==
Year
Year	Age	Slalom	Giant slalom	Super-G	Downhill	Combined	Team combined
2022	30	—	—	—	21	—	—N/a
2026	34	—	—	—	7	—N/a	11
