= Dominik Raschner =

Austrian alpine skier (born 1994)

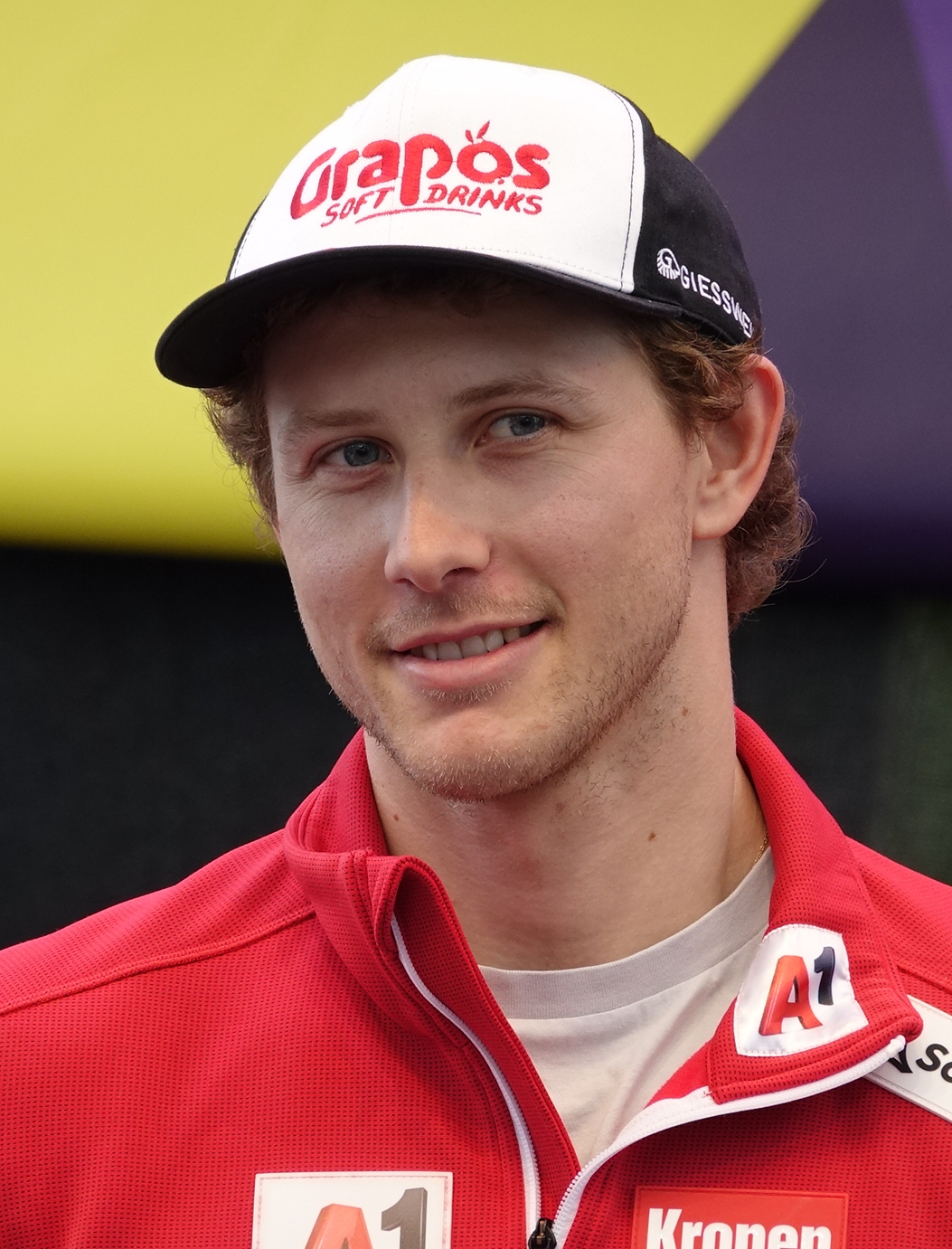
- Dominik Raschner in 2023

Personal information
- Born: 23 August 1994 (age 31) Austria
- Height: 1.85 m (6 ft 1 in)

Skiing career
- Country: Austria
- Sport: Alpine skiing
- Club: SC Mils – Tirol
- Disciplines: Slalom, giant slalom
- World Cup debut: 22 December 2015 (age 21)

Olympics
- Teams: 0

World Championships
- Teams: 2 – (2023, 2025)
- Medals: 1 (0 gold)

World Cup
- Seasons: 11 – (2016–2026)
- Wins: 0
- Podiums: 2 – (1 SL, 1 PG)
- Overall titles: 0 – (41st in 2024)
- Discipline titles: 0 – (2nd in PAR, 2022)
Medal record
Men's alpine skiing
Representing Austria
World Championships
Silver medal – second place	2023 Méribel	Parallel
World Cup race podiums
Event	1st	2nd	3rd
Slalom	0	0	1
Parallel	0	1	0
Total	0	1	1

Dominik Raschner (born 23 August 1994) is an Austrian World Cup alpine ski racer. He specializes in the technical events of slalom and giant slalom.

== Career ==
Raschner achieved his first podium, by finishing 2nd in the parallel-G in Lech in November 2021.

== World Cup results ==
=== Season standings ===
Season
Season	Age	Overall	Slalom	Giant slalom	Super-G	Downhill	Combined	Parallel
2020	25	112	—	43	—	—	—	21
2021	26	97	—	45	—	—	—N/a	9
2022	27	61	38	41	—	—	—N/a	2nd place, silver medalist(s)
2023	28	127	44	—	—	—	—N/a	—N/a
2024	29	41	16	37	—	—	—N/a	—N/a
2025	30	60	22	—	—	—	—N/a	—N/a
2026	31	70	24	—	—	—	—N/a	—N/a

=== Top-ten results ===
- 0 wins
- 2 podiums – (1 SL, 1 PG); 7 top tens

Season
Season	Date	Location	Discipline	Place
2021	27 November 2020	Lech/Zürs, Austria	Parallel-G	9th
2022	14 November 2021	Lech/Zürs, Austria	Parallel-G	2nd
2024	7 January 2024	Adelboden, Switzerland	Slalom	3rd
2024	21 January 2024	Kitzbühel, Austria	Slalom	7th
2024	4 February 2024	Chamonix, France	Slalom	5th
2026	22 November 2025	Gurgl, Austria	Slalom	6th
2026	8 March 2026	Kranjska Gora, Slovenia	Slalom	6th

== World Championship results ==
Year
Year	Age	Slalom	Giant slalom	Super-G	Downhill	Combined	Team combined	Parallel	Team event
2023	28	—	—	—	—	—	—N/a	2nd place, silver medalist(s)	4
2025	30	8	—	—	—	—N/a	DNF2	—N/a	6
