= Giuliano Razzoli =

Italian alpine skier

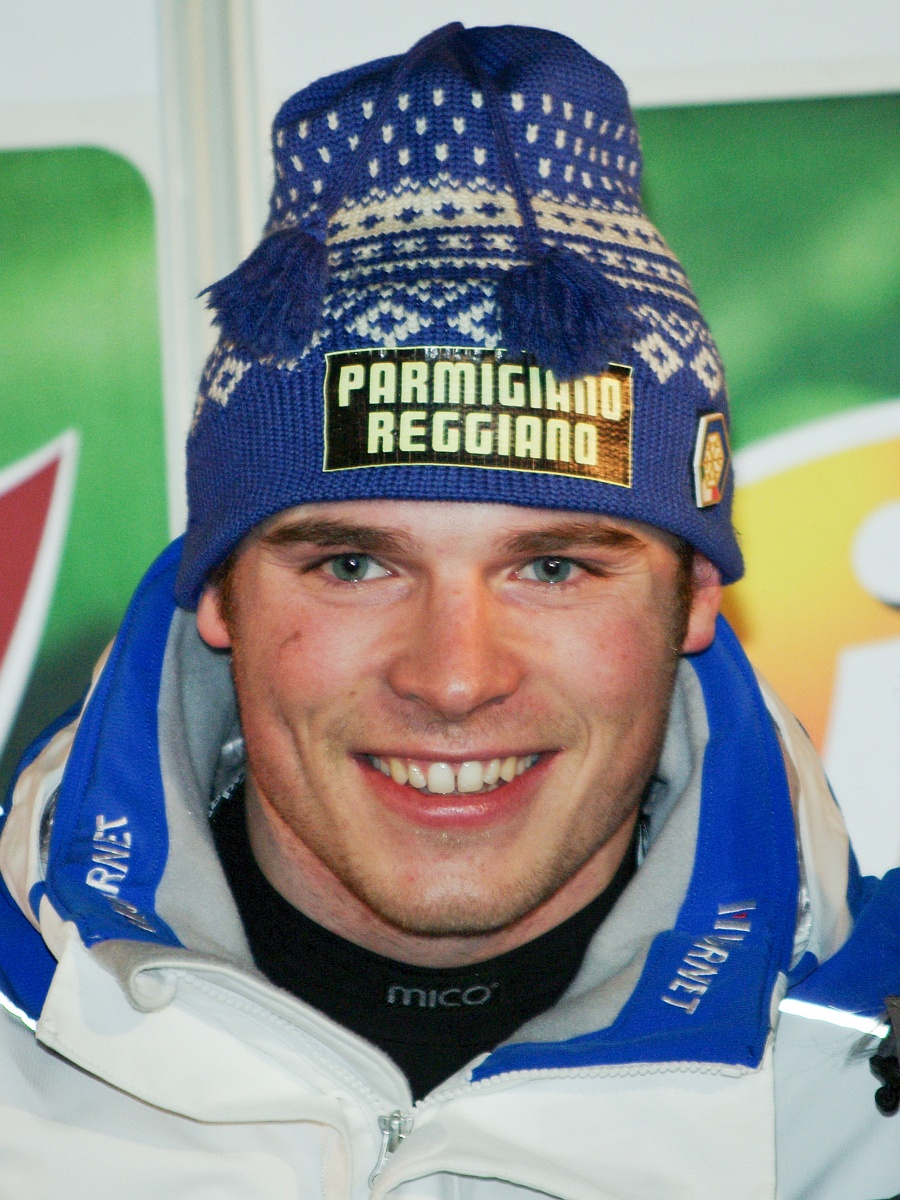
- Razzoli in January 2010

Personal information
- Born: 18 December 1984 (age 41) Castelnovo ne' Monti, Reggio Emilia, Italy
- Height: 1.82 m (6 ft 0 in)
- Website: giulianorazzoli.it

Skiing career
- Sport: Alpine skiing
- Club: C.S. Esercito
- Disciplines: Slalom
- World Cup debut: 18 December 2006 (age 22)

Olympics
- Teams: 2 – (2010, 2014)
- Medals: 1 (1 gold)

World Championships
- Teams: 7 – (2009–21)
- Medals: 0

World Cup
- Seasons: 16 – (2007–2022)
- Wins: 2 – (2 SL)
- Podiums: 11 – (11 SL)
- Overall titles: 0 – (25th in 2015)
- Discipline titles: 0 – (8th in SL, 2015)
Medal record
World Cup race podiums
Event	1st	2nd	3rd
Slalom	2	6	3
Total	2	6	3
Men's alpine skiing
Representing Italy
Olympic Games
Gold medal – first place	2010 Vancouver	Slalom

Giuliano Razzoli (born 18 December 1984) is a retired World Cup alpine ski racer and Olympic gold medalist from Italy. He specializes in the slalom; he won the Slalom at the 2010 Winter Olympics in Vancouver.

== Biography ==
Born at Castelnovo ne' Monti in Reggio Emilia, Razzoli took first place in slalom at the 2006 Italian Championships in Santa Caterina, Valfurva, which resulted in his automatic promotion to the Italian National A team. His World Cup debut was on his 22nd birthday, at a slalom in Alta Badia in December 2006.

Razzoli has nine World Cup podiums, all in slalom. His first World Cup victory came in January 2010 at Zagreb, Croatia, and his second was in Switzerland at Lenzerheide in March 2011.

== 2010 Winter Olympics ==
Razzoli became Olympic Champion at the 2010 Winter Olympics in Vancouver, winning the men's slalom. He clocked a combined total of one minute 39.32 seconds over the two runs, 0.16 seconds ahead of Croatia's Ivica Kostelic with Andre Myhrer of Sweden a further 0.28 seconds adrift.

25-year-old Razzoli, who was quickest in the first leg through fog and sleet at Whistler, became the first Italian man to win the Olympic Slalom title since Alberto Tomba, 22 years earlier at the 1988 Winter Olympics in Calgary. It was the only gold medal won by Italy at those Games.

== World Cup results ==
=== Season standings ===
Season	Age	Overall	Slalom	Giant Slalom	Super G	Downhill	Combined
2007	22	138	57	—	—	—	—
2008	23	100	38	—	—	—	—
2009	24	43	13	—	—	—	—
2010	25	33	11	—	—	—	—
2011	26	35	9	—	—	—	—
2012	27	47	13	—	—	—	—
2013	28	45	16	—	—	—	—
2014	29	78	27	—	—	—	—
2015	30	25	8	—	—	—	—
2016	31	61	19	—	—	—	—
2017	32	58	19	—	—	—	—
2018	33	No World Cup points					
2019	34	55	18	—	—	—	—
2020	35	85	29	—	—	—	—
2021	36	89	31	—	—	—	—
2022	37	32	15	—	—	—	—

Standings through 16 January 2022

=== Race podiums ===
- 2 wins – (2 SL)
- 11 podiums – (11 SL)

Season	Date	Location	Discipline	Place
2009	6 Jan 2009	Zagreb, Croatia	Slalom	3rd
2009	1 Mar 2009	Kranjska Gora, Slovenia	Slalom	2nd
2010	6 Jan 2010	Zagreb, Croatia	Slalom	1st
2010	24 Jan 2010	Kitzbühel, Austria	Slalom	3rd
2011	23 Jan 2011	Kitzbühel, Austria	Slalom	3rd
2011	19 Mar 2011	Lenzerheide, Switzerland	Slalom	1st
2012	19 Dec 2011	Alta Badia, Italy	Slalom	2nd
2015	15 Mar 2015	Kranjska Gora, Slovenia	Slalom	2nd
2015	22 Mar 2015	Méribel, France	Slalom	2nd
2016	17 Jan 2016	Wengen, Switzerland	Slalom	2nd
2022	16 Jan 2022	Wengen, Switzerland	Slalom	3rd

== World Championship results ==
Year	Age	Slalom	Giant slalom	Super-G	Downhill	Combined
2009	24	DNF1	—	—	—	—
2011	26	DNF2	—	—	—	—
2013	28	DNF1	—	—	—	—
2015	30	DNF1	—	—	—	—
2017	32	22	—	—	—	—
2019	34	22	—	—	—	—
2021	36	DSQ1	—	—	—	—

== Olympic results ==
Year	Age	Slalom	Giant slalom	Super-G	Downhill	Combined
2010	25	1	—	—	—	—
2014	29	DNF2	—	—	—	—
2022	37	8	—	—	—	—
