= 2020–21 FIS Alpine Ski Europa Cup =

Alpine skiing competition

Discipline	Men	Women
Overall	(Austria) Maximilian Lahnsteiner	(Norway) Marte Monsen
Downhill	(France) Victor Schuller	(Austria) Lisa Grill
Super-G	(Switzerland) Stefan Rogentin	(Switzerland) Jasmina Suter
Giant Slalom	(Austria) Dominik Raschner	(Norway) Marte Monsen
Slalom	(United Kingdom) Billy Major	(Slovenia) Andreja Slokar
Combined	(Switzerland) Joel Lütolf	not disputed

Competition
Locations	15	15
Individual	35	37
Cancelled	5	11

2020–21 FIS Alpine Ski Europa Cup was the 50th season of the FIS Alpine Ski Europa Cup.

== Standings ==
=== Overall ===
Men

Rank	Skier	Country	Points
1	Maximilian Lahnsteiner	Austria	692
2	Raphael Haaser	Austria	668
3	Dominik Raschner	Austria	570
4	Ralph Weber	Switzerland	494
5	Stefan Rogentin	Switzerland	429
6	Victor Schuller	France	415
7	Julian Rauchfuss	Germany	398
8	Alexander Steen Olsen	Norway	367
9	Lars Rösti	Switzerland	360
10	Giovanni Franzoni	Italy	353

Women

Rank	Skier	Country	Points
1	Marte Monsen	Norway	591
2	Andreja Slokar	Slovenia	553
3	Jessica Hilzinger	Germany	502
4	Lisa Grill	Austria	489
5	Zrinka Ljutić	Croatia	474
6	Sara Rask	Sweden	457
7	Hanna Aronsson Elfman	Sweden	441
8	Roberta Midali	Italy	427
9	Simone Wild	Switzerland	382
10	Karoline Pichler	Italy	369

=== Downhill ===
Men

Rank	Skier	Country	Points
1	Victor Schuller	France	334
2	Maximilian Lahnsteiner	Austria	319
3	Erik Arvidsson	United States	285
4	Olle Sundin	Sweden	231
5	Sam Alphand	France	201

Women

Rank	Skier	Country	Points
1	Lisa Grill	Austria	280
2	Nadine Fest	Austria	160
3	Vanessa Nußbaumer	Austria	114
4	Christina Ager	Austria	105
5	Jasmine Flury	Switzerland	100

=== Super-G ===
Men

Rank	Skier	Country	Points
1	Stefan Rogentin	Switzerland	328
2	Ralph Weber	Switzerland	325
3	Roy Piccard	France	305
4	Maximilian Lahnsteiner	Austria	297
5	Raphael Haaser	Austria	253

Women

Rank	Skier	Country	Points
1	Jasmina Suter	Switzerland	252
2	Stephanie Jenal	Switzerland	250
3	Julija Pleškova	Russia	180
4	Lisa Grill	Austria	160
5	Rahel Kopp	Switzerland	149

=== Giant Slalom ===
Men

Rank	Skier	Country	Points
1	Dominik Raschner	Austria	353
2	Semyel Bissig	Switzerland	301
3	Timon Haugan	Norway	300
4	Julian Rauchfuss	Germany	298
5	Hannes Zingerle	Italy	262

Women

Rank	Skier	Country	Points
1	Marte Monsen	Norway	553
2	Simone Wild	Switzerland	382
3	Hilma Lövblom	Sweden	350
4	Jessica Hilzinger	Germany	338
5	Hanna Aronsson Elfman	Sweden	315

=== Slalom ===
Men

Rank	Skier	Country	Points
1	Billy Major	United Kingdom	258
2	Anton Tremmel	Germany	248
3	Marc Rochat	Switzerland	237
4	Alexander Steen Olsen	Norway	225
5	Jett Seymour	United States	220

Women

Rank	Skier	Country	Points
1	Andreja Slokar	Slovenia	465
2	Lara Della Mea	Italy	341
3	Sara Rask	Sweden	297
4	Zrinka Ljutić	Croatia	273
5	Marie-Therese Sporer	Austria	272

=== Combined ===
Men

Rank	Skier	Country	Points
1	Joel Lütolf	Switzerland	100
2	Florian Loriot	France	80
3	Luca Aerni	Switzerland	60
4	Christian Borgnaes	Austria	50
5	Justin Murisier	Switzerland	45
