= Slokar =

Slokar is a Slovene surname. Notable people with the surname include:

- Andreja Slokar (born 1997), Slovenian alpine ski racer
- Uroš Slokar (born 1983), Slovenian basketball player
