= Crveni spust =

Ski course on Medvednica, Croatia

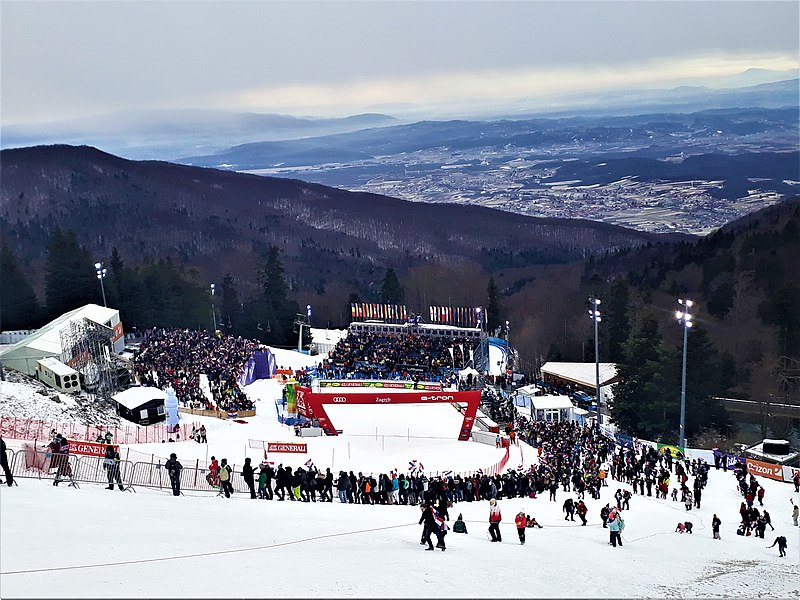
- January 2019
- Interactive map of Crveni spust
- Location within Europe Location within Alps Location within Croatia
- 45°54′18″N 15°56′31″E
- Location: Zagreb, Croatia
- Mountain: Medvednica (Sljeme)
- Opened: 1946 (for tourism); 2005 (WC women); 2008 (WC men)
- Competition: Snow Queen Trophy

Slalom
- Start: 978 m (3,209 ft) (AA)
- Finish: 768 m (2,520 ft)
- Vertical drop: 210 m (689 ft)
- Max incline: 27 degrees (51%)
- Min incline: 5.1 degrees (10%)
- Most Wins (M): (Austria) Marcel Hirscher (5x)
- Most Wins (W): (United States) Mikaela Shiffrin (5x)

Crveni spust (lit. 'red slope') is a World Cup slalom ski course at Medvednica mountain near Zagreb, Croatia, first opened in 1946 by the city.

This course is hosting World Cup slalom events since 2005 (women) and 2008 (men) for the Snow Queen Trophy competition.

It is located just north of the peak Sljeme, whose sports facility maintenance organization manages the venue.

== World Cup ==
It hosted total of 15 World Cup events for women (37th of all-time) and 12 World Cup events for men (34th of all-time).

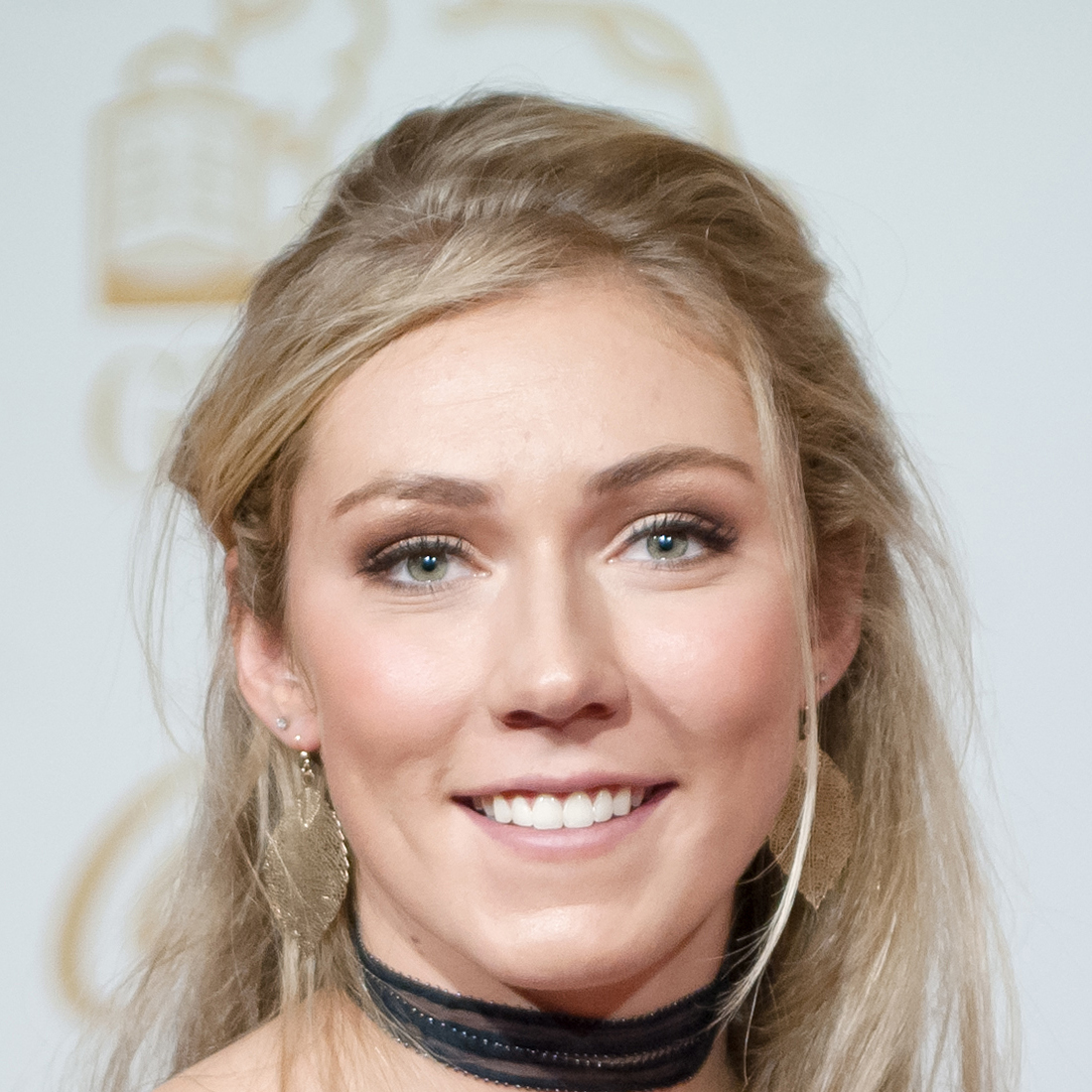
Mikaela Shiffrin (record five wins)

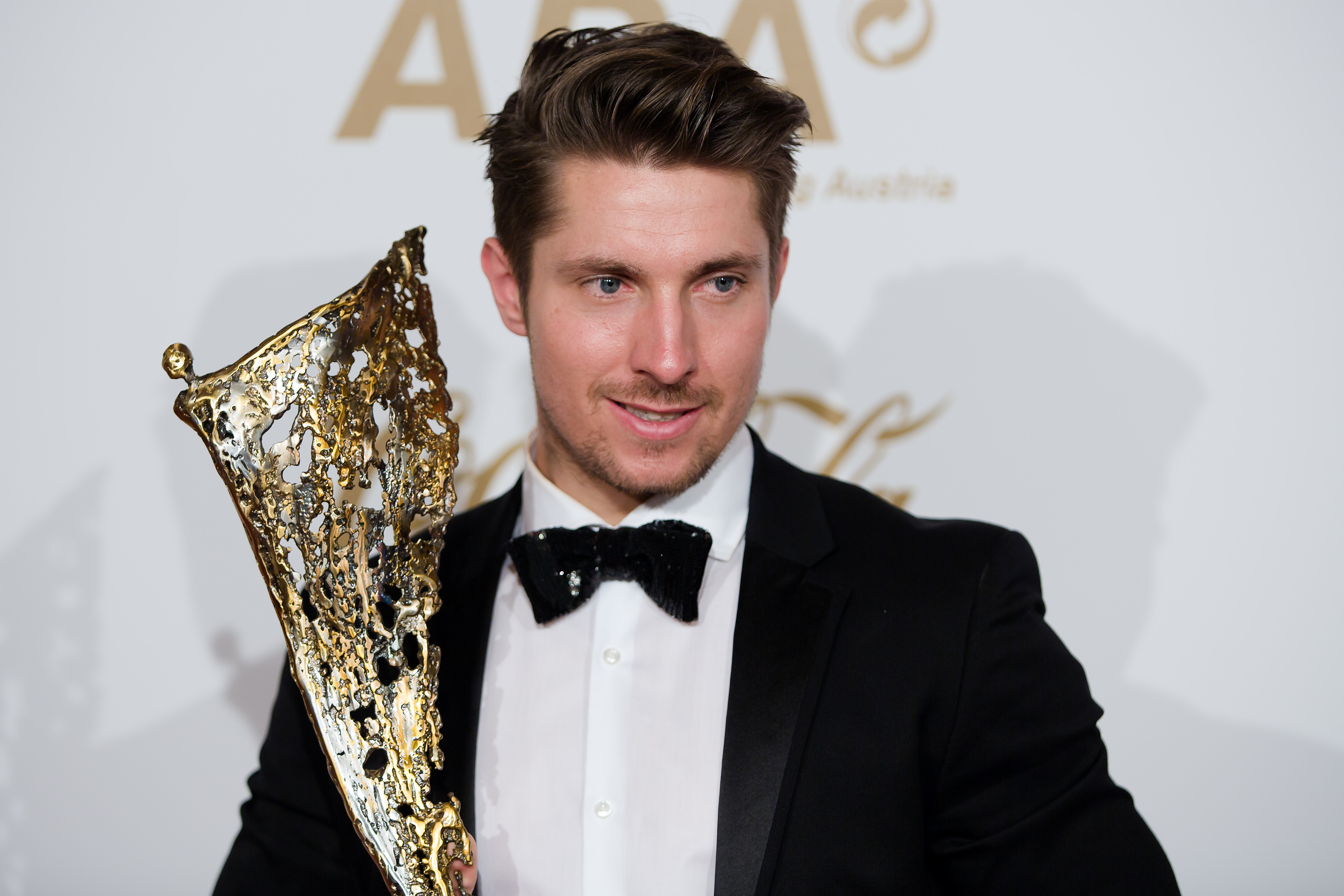
Marcel Hirscher (record five wins)

=== Women's slalom ===
No.	Type	Season	Date	Winner	Second	Third
1134	SL	2004/05	20 January 2005	(Finland) Tanja Poutiainen	(United States) Kristina Koznick	(Austria) Marlies Schild
1159	SL	2005/06	5 January 2006	(Austria) Marlies Schild	(Austria) Kathrin Zettel	(Croatia) Janica Kostelić
1195	SL	2006/07	4 January 2007	(Austria) Marlies Schild	(Croatia) Ana Jelušić	(Czech Republic) Šárka Záhrobská
1244	SL	2007/08	15 February 2008	(Finland) Tanja Poutiainen	(Austria) Marlies Schild	(Slovakia) Veronika Zuzulová
1264	SL	2008/09	4 January 2009	(Germany) Maria Riesch	(Italy) Nicole Gius	(Czech Republic) Šárka Záhrobská
1299	SL	2009/10	3 January 2010	(France) Sandrine Aubert	(Austria) Kathrin Zettel	(Germany) Susanne Riesch
1332	SL	2010/11	4 January 2011	(Austria) Marlies Schild	(Germany) Maria Riesch	(Italy) Manuela Mölgg
1362	SL	2011/12	3 January 2012	(Austria) Marlies Schild	(Slovenia) Tina Maze	(Austria) Michaela Kirchgasser
1405	SL	2012/13	4 January 2013	(United States) Mikaela Shiffrin	(Sweden) Frida Hansdotter	(Canada) Erin Mielzynski
	SL	2013/14	4 January 2014	lack of snow		
1468	SL	2014/15	4 January 2015	(United States) Mikaela Shiffrin	(Austria) Kathrin Zettel	(Norway) Nina Løseth
	SL	2015/16	5 January 2016	lack of snow		
1542	SL	2016/17	3 January 2017	(Slovakia) Veronika Velez-Zuzulová	(Slovakia) Petra Vlhová	(Czech Republic) Šárka Strachová
1579	SL	2017/18	3 January 2018	(United States) Mikaela Shiffrin	(Switzerland) Wendy Holdener	(Sweden) Frida Hansdotter
1618	SL	2018/19	5 January 2019	(United States) Mikaela Shiffrin	(Slovakia) Petra Vlhová	(Switzerland) Wendy Holdener
1649	SL	2019/20	4 January 2020	(Slovakia) Petra Vlhová	(United States) Mikaela Shiffrin	(Austria) Katharina Liensberger
1677	SL	2020/21	3 January 2021	(Slovakia) Petra Vlhová	(Austria) Katharina Liensberger	(Switzerland) Michelle Gisin
1714	SL	2021/22	4 January 2022	(Slovakia) Petra Vlhová	(United States) Mikaela Shiffrin	(Austria) Katharina Liensberger
1750	SL	2022/23	4 January 2023	(United States) Mikaela Shiffrin	(Slovakia) Petra Vlhová	(Sweden) Anna Swenn-Larsson
	SL	2022/23	5 January 2021	high temperatures and wind; no replacement		

=== Men's slalom ===
No.	Type	Season	Date	Winner	Second	Third
1327	SL	2007/08	17 February 2008	(Austria) Mario Matt	(Croatia) Ivica Kostelić	(Austria) Reinfried Herbst
1352	SL	2008/09	6 January 2009	(France) Jean-Baptiste Grange	(Croatia) Ivica Kostelić	(Italy) Giuliano Razzoli
1389	SL	2009/10	6 January 2010	(Italy) Giuliano Razzoli	(Italy) Manfred Mölgg	(France) Julien Lizeroux
1420	SL	2010/11	6 January 2011	(Sweden) André Myhrer	(Croatia) Ivica Kostelić	(Sweden) Mattias Hargin
1457	SL	2011/12	5 January 2012	(Austria) Marcel Hirscher	(Germany) Felix Neureuther	(Croatia) Ivica Kostelić
1503	SL	2012/13	6 January 2013	(Austria) Marcel Hirscher	(Sweden) André Myhrer	(Austria) Mario Matt
	SL	2013/14	6 January 2014	lack of snow		
1570	SL	2014/15	6 January 2015	(Austria) Marcel Hirscher	(Germany) Felix Neureuther	(Norway) Sebastian Foss Solevåg
	SL	2015/16	6 January 2016	lack of snow		
1651	SL	2016/17	5 January 2017	(Italy) Manfred Mölgg	(Germany) Felix Neureuther	(Norway) Henrik Kristoffersen
1689	SL	2017/18	4 January 2018	(Austria) Marcel Hirscher	(Austria) Michael Matt	(Norway) Henrik Kristoffersen
1726	SL	2018/19	6 January 2019	(Austria) Marcel Hirscher	(France) Alexis Pinturault	(Austria) Manuel Feller
1761	SL	2019/20	5 January 2020	(France) Clément Noël	(Switzerland) Ramon Zenhäusern	(Italy) Alex Vinatzer
1796	SL	2020/21	6 January 2021	(Germany) Linus Straßer	(Austria) Manuel Feller	(Austria) Marco Schwarz
	SL	2021/22	5 January 2022	high temperatures and strong wind; rescheduled on 6 January 2022		
	SL	2021/22	6 January 2022	cancelled in 1st run after 19 skiers; poor snow conditions		

== Course sections ==
- Filter, Flat, Finish Steep
