= 2022 Alpine Skiing World Cup – Men's parallel =

Alpine ski discipline year standings

2022 men's parallel World Cup: 2022 men's World Cup; Overall • downhill • super-g; giant slalom • slalom • parallel
Previous: 2021	Next: 2023

The men's parallel competition in the 2022 FIS Alpine Skiing World Cup involved only 1 event, a parallel giant slalom, due to the COVID-19 pandemic. The sole event was won by Christian Hirschbühl of Austria, who thus won the season championship. However, because there was only one race, Hirschbühl did not win a crystal globe symbolizing his championship. This specific championship includes both parallel giant slalom and parallel slalom races. At this time, individual parallel races are not included in the season finals.

The season was interrupted by the 2022 Winter Olympics in Beijing, China (at the Yanqing National Alpine Skiing Centre in Yanqing District) from 6–20 February 2022. The only parallel competition was a mixed team competition (2 men and 2 women per country), which was held on 20 February 2022.

As of 2025, this was the last season that parallel was contested as a World Cup event.

== Standings ==
#	Skier	14 Nov 2021; Lech/Zürs (Austria); PG	Total
1	(Austria) Christian Hirschbühl	100	100
2	(Austria) Dominik Raschner	80	80
3	(Norway) Atle Lie McGrath	60	60
4	(Norway) Henrik Kristoffersen	50	50
5	(Canada) Trevor Philp	45	45
6	(Austria) Adrian Pertl	40	40
7	(Canada) Erik Read	36	36
8	(Slovenia) Štefan Hadalin	32	32
9	(Germany) Julian Rauchfuss	29	29
10	(Slovenia) Žan Kranjec	26	26
10	(Austria) Stefan Brennsteiner	26	26
12	(Germany) Linus Straßer	22	22
13	(Italy) Alex Vinatzer	20	20
14	(Germany) Alexander Schmid	18	18
15	(France) Cyprien Sarrazin	16	16
16	(Belgium) Armand Marchant	15	15
17	(United Kingdom) Charlie Raposo	14	14
18	(France) Thibaut Favrot	13	13
19	(France) Victor Muffat-Jeandet	12	12
20	(Switzerland) Gino Caviezel	11	11
21	(Sweden) Mattias Rönngren	10	10
22	(Switzerland) Cédric Noger	9	9
23	(Norway) Leif Kristian Nestvold-Haugen	8	8
24	(Croatia) Filip Zubčić	7	7
25	(Austria) Thomas Dorner	6	6
	References		

- Winner
- 2nd place
- 3rd place
- DNS = Did not start
- DNQ = Did not qualify
- Updated at 4 December 2021, after all events.

== See also ==
- 2022 Alpine Skiing World Cup – Men's summary rankings
- 2022 Alpine Skiing World Cup – Men's overall
- 2022 Alpine Skiing World Cup – Men's downhill
- 2022 Alpine Skiing World Cup – Men's super-G
- 2022 Alpine Skiing World Cup – Men's giant slalom
- 2022 Alpine Skiing World Cup – Men's slalom
- World Cup scoring system
