= Maximilian Lahnsteiner =

Austrian alpine skier

Personal information
- Born: 16 August 1996 (age 29) Gmunden, Austria
- Height: 1.83 m (6 ft 0 in)

Skiing career
- Sport: Alpine skiing
- Club: SK Ebensee
- Disciplines: Speed events
- World Cup debut: 2020–21

World Cup
- Seasons: 1
- Podiums: 0
Medal record
Men's alpine skiing
Representing Austria
World Junior Championships
Silver medal – second place	2015 Hafjell	Team event
Bronze medal – third place	2016 Sochi	Giant slalom

Maximilian Lahnsteiner (born 16 August 1996) is an Austrian alpine skier who won the Europa Cup overall title in 2021.

== Career ==
The victory in the general classification of the European Cup 2021 had made him acquire the right to be included in the Wunderteam for the world cup competitions, but a serious injury to his left cruciate ligament in training in Val Senales, caused him to lose the inaugural race in Soelden, for which he was selected, and the entire 2021-22 season.

However, in October 2022 he was again called up with the Austria national alpine ski team, once again for the inaugural race of the 2022-23 season in Soelden.

== World Cup results ==
Date	Place	Discipline	Rank
06-03-2021	(Austria) Saalbach-Hinterglemm	Downhill	30

== Europa Cup results ==
Lahnsteiner has won an overall Europa Cup.

- FIS Alpine Ski Europa Cup
  - Overall: 2021
