= Christian Hirschbühl =

Austrian alpine skier (born 1990)

Personal information
- Born: 19 April 1990 (age 36) Bregenz, Austria

Skiing career
- Sport: Alpine skiing
- Club: SV Riefensberg – Vorarlberg
- Disciplines: Slalom, giant slalom
World Cup debut
17 January 2015 (age 24)

World Championships
- Teams: 1 − (2019)
- Medals: 1 (team) (0 gold)

World Cup
- Seasons: 8 – (2015–2022)
- Wins: 1 – (1 PG)
- Podiums: 1 – (1 PG)
- Overall titles: 0 – (37th in 2019)
- Discipline titles: 0 – (13th in SL, 2019)
Medal record
Men's alpine skiing
Representing Austria
World Championships
Silver medal – second place	2019 Åre	Team event

Christian Hirschbühl (born 19 April 1990) is an Austrian alpine ski racer. Hirschbühl specializes in the technical events of slalom and giant slalom.

== Career ==
Hirschbühl made his World Cup debut on 17 January 2015 in the Wengen slalom, but did not finish the first run. On 25 October 2015 at Sölden, he scored his first World Cup points, with a 22nd in the giant slalom.

== World Cup results ==
=== Season standings ===
Season	Age	Overall	Slalom	Giant slalom	Super-G	Downhill	Combined	Parallel
2016	25	95	34	41	—	—	—	
2017	26	76	28	57	—	—	—	
2018	27	60	25	56	—	—	—	
2019	28	37	13	—	—	—	—	
2020	29	85	33	—	—	—	—	29
2021	30	56	25	—	—	—	—	8
2022	31	10	21	—	—	—	—	1

Standings through 12 December 2021

=== Race podiums ===
- 1 win – (1 PG)
- 1 podium – (1 PG); 12 top tens

Season	Date	Location	Discipline	Place
2022	14 Nov 2021	Lech/Zürs, Austria	Parallel-G	1st
