= 2022 Alpine Skiing World Cup – Men's overall =

Alpine ski discipline year standings

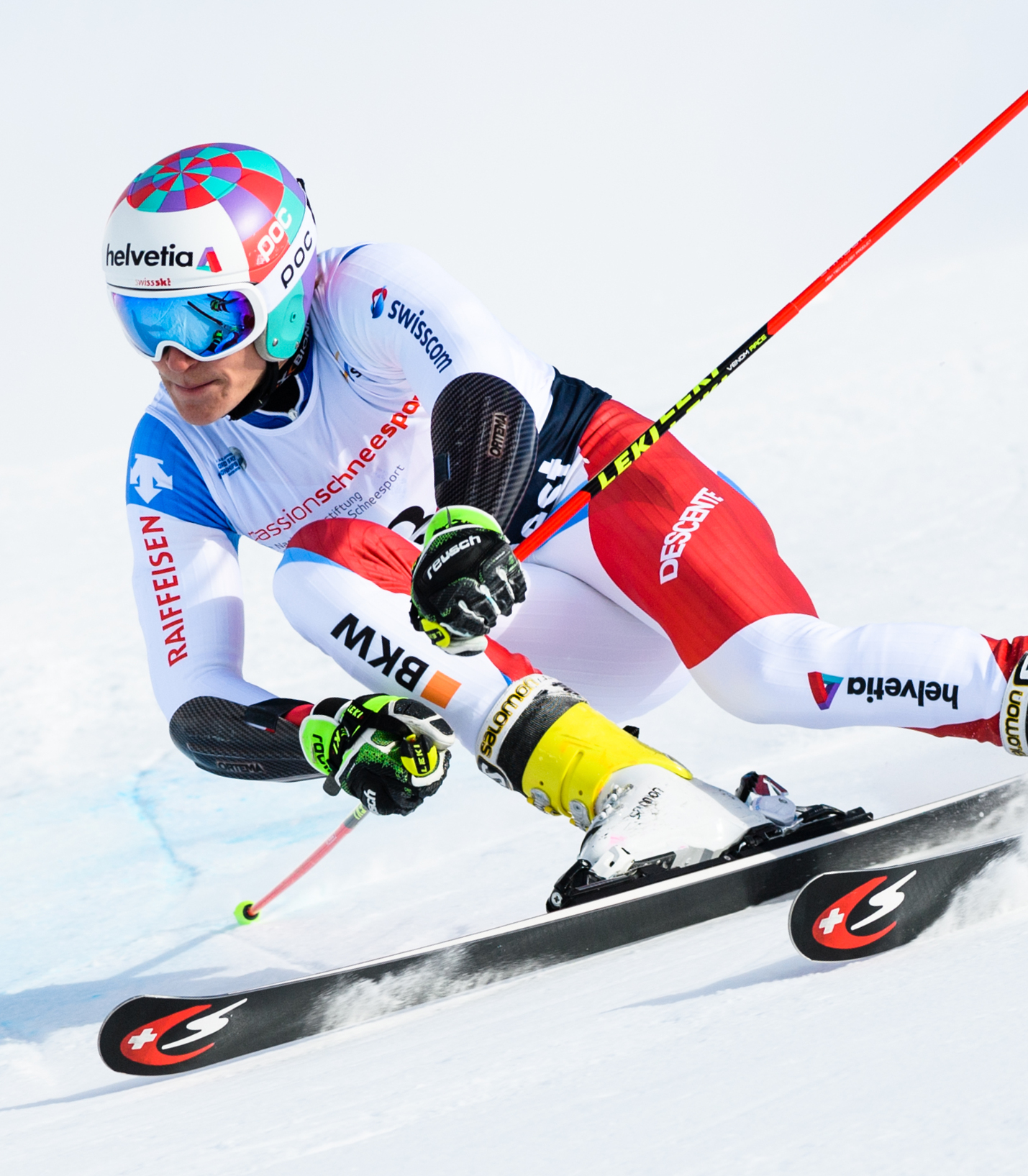
2022 men's overall World Cup: Marco Odermatt of Switzerland, season champion; 2022 men's World Cup; Overall • downhill • super-g; giant slalom • slalom • parallel
Previous: 2021	Next: 2023

The men's overall in the 2022 FIS Alpine Skiing World Cup consisted of 37 events in 5 disciplines: downhill, Super-G, giant slalom, slalom, and parallel. The sixth discipline, Alpine combined, had all of its events in the 2021–22 season cancelled due to the schedule disruption cased by the COVID-19 pandemic, which also happened in 2020–21. The schedules were also revamped as a consequence of the pandemic, thus ensuring that the combined number of speed races (18, consisting of 11 downhills and 7 Super-Gs) was the same as the combined number of technical races (18, consisting of 10 slaloms and 8 giant slaloms), with just one parallel race. The season did not have any cancellations.

The season was interrupted by the 2022 Winter Olympics in Beijing, China (at the Yanqing National Alpine Skiing Centre in Yanqing District) from 6–19 February 2022.

After 34 events, Marco Odermatt of Switzerland had clinched the season championship. Although Odermatt was less than 200 points ahead of Aleksander Aamodt Kilde of Norway on 6 March, Kilde announced that he would skip the next three races, allowing Odermatt to build an insurmountable lead.

The last four events of the season took place at the World Cup final, Wednesday, 16 March through Sunday, 20 March in the linked resorts of Courchevel and Méribel, France, which are located in Les Trois Vallées. Only the top 25 in each specific discipline for the season and the winner of the Junior World Championship in each discipline were eligible to compete in the final, with the exception that athletes who have scored at least 500 points in the overall classification were eligible to participate in any discipline, regardless of standing in that discipline for the season.

== Standings ==
#	Skier	DH; 11 races	SG; 7 races	GS; 8 races	SL; 10 races	PAR; 1 race	Total
	(Switzerland) Marco Odermatt	517	402	720	0	0	1,639
2	(Norway) Aleksander Aamodt Kilde	620	530	22	0	0	1,172
3	(Norway) Henrik Kristoffersen	0	0	453	451	50	954
4	(Austria) Matthias Mayer	508	372	0	0	0	880
5	(Austria) Vincent Kriechmayr	465	375	0	0	0	840
6	(Switzerland) Beat Feuz	607	213	0	0	0	820
7	(Austria) Manuel Feller	0	0	326	361	0	687
8	(Italy) Dominik Paris	522	158	0	0	0	680
9	(Norway) Lucas Braathen	0	0	308	347	0	655
10	(France) Alexis Pinturault	0	120	300	183	0	603
11	(Switzerland) Loïc Meillard	0	43	252	283	0	578
12	(Norway) Atle Lie McGrath	0	0	126	348	60	534
13	(Switzerland) Niels Hintermann	432	60	0	0	0	492
14	(Canada) James Crawford	170	226	0	0	0	396
15	(United States) Ryan Cochran-Siegle	230	151	4	0	0	385
16	(Switzerland) Gino Caviezel	0	139	216	0	11	366
17	(Switzerland) Justin Murisier	6	108	246	0	0	360
18	(Austria) Daniel Hemetsberger	346	0	0	0	0	346
19	(France) Johan Clarey	301	41	0	0	0	342
20	(United States) Travis Ganong	211	130	0	0	0	341
21	(Germany) Linus Straßer	0	0	0	307	22	329
22	(Austria) Marco Schwarz	0	0	107	220	0	327
23	(Croatia) Filip Zubčić	0	0	158	145	7	310
24	(Switzerland) Daniel Yule	0	0	0	283	0	283
25	(Austria) Stefan Brennsteiner	0	0	253	0	24	277
26	(Austria) Max Franz	195	80	0	0	0	275
27	(Italy) Luca De Aliprandini	0	0	273	0	0	273
28	(Austria) Daniel Danklmaier	181	88	0	0	0	269
29	(Switzerland) Stefan Rogentin	92	173	0	0	0	265
30	(United Kingdom) Dave Ryding	0	0	0	262	0	262
31	(France) Clément Noël	0	0	0	257	0	257
32	(Norway) Sebastian Foss-Solevåg	0	0	0	252	0	252
33	(Canada) Erik Read	0	0	129	84	36	249
34	(Austria) Johannes Strolz	0	0	0	245	0	245
35	(Italy) Alex Vinatzer	0	0	0	209	20	229
	(Germany) Romed Baumann	137	92	0	0	0	229
37	(Slovenia) Žan Kranjec	0	0	180	13	26	219
38	(United States) Bryce Bennett	206	6	0	0	0	212
39	(Germany) Alexander Schmid	0	0	175	18	18	211
	(France) Matthieu Bailet	76	135	0	0	0	211
41	(Austria) Raphael Haaser	0	170	40	0	0	210
42	(Italy) Christof Innerhofer	132	77	0	0	0	209
43	(Italy) Tommaso Sala	0	0	0	206	0	206
44	(Italy) Giuliano Razzoli	0	0	0	204	0	204
45	(Austria) Otmar Striedinger	202	1	0	0	0	203
46	(Germany) Andreas Sander	60	137	0	0	0	197
	(France) Mathieu Faivre	0	25	172	0	0	197
48	(Germany) Josef Ferstl	106	86	0	0	0	192
49	(Norway) Timon Haugan	0	0	7	180	0	187
50	(Austria) Michael Matt	0	0	0	181	0	181
51	(Italy) Matteo Marsaglia	148	25	0	0	0	173
52	(Sweden) Kristoffer Jakobsen	0	0	0	160	0	160
53	(Canada) Trevor Philp	0	27	84	0	45	156
54	(Spain) Joaquim Salarich	0	0	0	152	0	152
55	(Italy) Mattia Casse	71	77	0	0	0	148
	(Germany) Dominik Schwaiger	148	0	0	0	0	148

- Leader
- 2nd place
- 3rd place
- Updated at 20 March 2022, after all events

== See also ==
- 2022 Alpine Skiing World Cup – Men's summary rankings
- 2022 Alpine Skiing World Cup – Men's downhill
- 2022 Alpine Skiing World Cup – Men's super-G
- 2022 Alpine Skiing World Cup – Men's giant slalom
- 2022 Alpine Skiing World Cup – Men's slalom
- 2022 Alpine Skiing World Cup – Men's parallel
- 2022 Alpine Skiing World Cup – Women's overall
- World Cup scoring system
