= Andreja Slokar =

Slovenian alpine skier (born 1997)

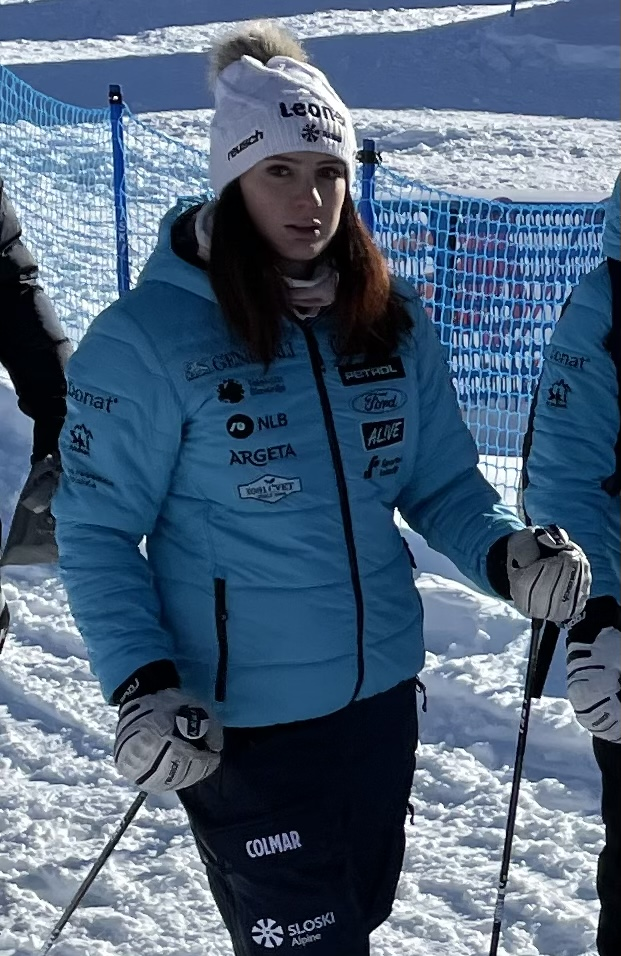
- At Sestriere in December 2022

Personal information
- Born: 15 October 1997 (age 28) Ajdovščina, Slovenia

Skiing career
- Country: Slovenia
- Sport: Alpine skiing
- Club: SK Dol Ajdovščina
- Disciplines: Slalom, giant slalom
- World Cup debut: 6 January 2018 (age 20)

Olympics
- Teams: 1 – (2022)
- Medals: 0

World Championships
- Teams: 2 – (2021, 2025)
- Medals: 0

World Cup
- Seasons: 7 – (2018–2022), (2024–2025)
- Wins: 2 – (1 SL, 1 PG)
- Podiums: 3 – (1 SL, 2 PG)
- Overall titles: 0 – (23rd in 2022)
- Discipline titles: 0 – (8th in SL, 2022)
Medal record
Women's alpine skiing
Representing Slovenia

Andreja Slokar (born 15 October 1997) is a Slovenian World Cup alpine ski racer and specializes in the technical events of slalom and giant slalom. At the World Championships in 2021, she was fifth in the slalom.

On 13 November 2021, Slokar attained her first World Cup podium with a victory in a parallel giant slalom at Lech/Zürs, Austria.

== World Cup results ==
=== Season standings ===
Season
Season	Age	Overall	Slalom	Giant slalom	Super-G	Downhill	Combined	Parallel
2021	23	46	19	31	—	—	—N/a	—
2022	24	23	8	30	—	—	—N/a	1
2023	25	Injured, out for season					—N/a	—N/a
2024	26	61	21	—	—	—	—N/a	—N/a
2025	27	32	12	—	—	—	—N/a	—N/a

=== Race podiums ===
- 2 wins – (1 SL, 1 PG)
- 3 podiums – (2 SL, 1 PG), 16 top tens

Season
Season	Date	Location	Discipline	Place
2022	13 Nov 2021	Lech/Zürs, Austria	Parallel-G	1st
2022	19 Mar 2022	Méribel, France	Slalom	1st
2025	27 Mar 2025	(United States) Sun Valley, USA	Slalom	3rd

== World Championship results ==
Year
Year	Age	Slalom	Giant slalom	Super-G	Downhill	Combined	Team; Combined	Parallel	Team; Event
2021	23	5	—	—	—	—	—N/a	24	11
2025	27	6	—	—	—	—N/a	9	—N/a	—

== Olympic results ==
Year
Year	Age	Slalom	Giant slalom	Super-G	Downhill	Combined	Team Event
2022	24	5	DNF2	—	—	—	7
