= 2022 Alpine Skiing World Cup – Men's giant slalom =

Alpine ski discipline year standings

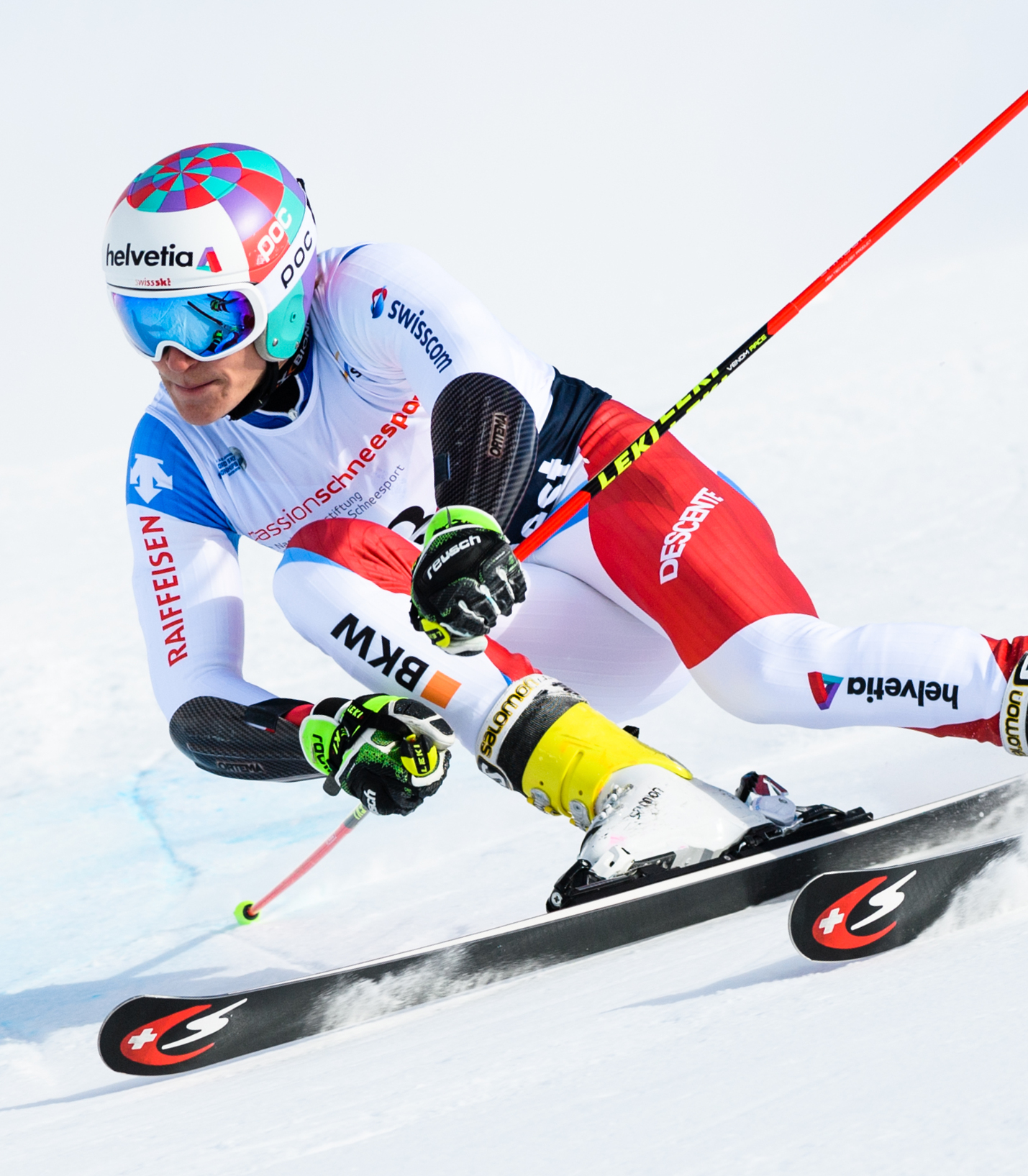
2022 Men's Giant slalom World Cup: Marco Odermatt of Switzerland, season champion; 2022 Men's World Cup; Overall • Downhill • Super-G; Giant slalom • Slalom • Parallel
Previous: 2021	Next: 2023

The men's giant slalom in the 2022 FIS Alpine Skiing World Cup consisted of eight events including the final. At the halfway point of the season (five events), Marco Odermatt of Switzerland had opened a commanding lead in the discipline by winning four of the races and finishing second in the other. The remainder of the season was held in March, after the 2022 Winter Olympics, but in the first post-Olympic event, Odermatt clinched the crystal globe for the season championship.

As discussed above, the season was interrupted by the 2022 Winter Olympics in Beijing, China (at the Yanqing National Alpine Skiing Centre in Yanqing District) from 6–19 February 2022. Each nation is limited to no more than four competitors per event. The men's giant slalom was held at the "Ice River" course on 13 February 2022.

The World Cup final was held on Saturday, 19 March in the linked resorts of Courchevel and Méribel, France, which are located in Les Trois Vallées, on the Roc de Fer course at Méribel. Only the top 25 skiers in the World Cup downhill discipline and the winner of the Junior World Championship, plus athletes who have scored at least 500 points in the World Cup overall classification for the season, are eligible to compete in the final, and only the top 15 earn World Cup points.

== Standings ==
	Venue	24 Oct 2021; Sölden	11 Dec 2021; Val-d'Isère	19 Dec 2021; Alta Badia	20 Dec 2021; Alta Badia	08 Jan 2022; Adelboden	13 Feb 2022; Beijing	12 Mar 2022; Kranjska Gora	13 Mar 2022; Kranjska Gora	19 Mar 2022; Méribel	
#	Skier	(Austria)	(France)	(Italy)	(Italy)	(Switzerland)	(China)	(Slovenia)	(Slovenia)	(France)	Total
	(Switzerland) Marco Odermatt	100	100	80	100	100	①	80	60	100	720
2	(Norway) Henrik Kristoffersen	18	45	100	50	40	⑧	100	100	DNF1	453
3	(Austria) Manuel Feller	16	60	60	45	80	DNF2	29	36	0	326
4	(Norway) Lucas Braathen	36	24	14	24	DNF1	DNF2	80	50	80	308
5	(France) Alexis Pinturault	45	80	16	13	60	⑤	24	22	40	300
6	(Italy) Luca De Aliprandini	32	50	45	80	DNF1	DNF2	40	26	0	273
7	(Austria) Stefan Brennsteiner	DNF2	16	26	36	DNF1	㉗	45	80	50	253
8	(Switzerland) Loïc Meillard	15	36	20	10	32	DNF1	50	29	60	252
9	(Switzerland) Justin Murisier	22	29	36	40	50	DNF1	22	18	29	246
10	(Switzerland) Gino Caviezel	50	14	11	DNF1	24	⑦	32	40	45	216
11	(Slovenia) Žan Kranjec	60	26	20	22	DNF1	②	26	26	0	180
12	(Germany) Alexander Schmid	12	40	DNQ	60	DNF2	DNF1	18	45	0	175
13	(France) Mathieu Faivre	24	32	15	29	45	③	11	16	0	172
14	(Croatia) Filip Zubčić	29	DNF2	29	22	36	⑩	16	8	18	158
15	(United States) River Radamus	40	20	40	26	DNF1	④	15	6	0	147
16	(Canada) Erik Read	13	6	24	18	22	⑬	12	14	20	129
17	(Norway) Atle Lie McGrath	DNF1	4	22	DNF1	DNS	DNF1	36	32	32	126
18	(Austria) Patrick Feurstein	DNQ	13	50	DNQ	16	DNS	DNQ	10	36	125
19	(Norway) Rasmus Windingstad	26	DNS	32	36	DNQ	DNS	DNF1	20	0	114
20	(Austria) Marco Schwarz	20	DNS	13	12	29	⑭	DNQ	7	26	107
21	(Canada) Trevor Philp	9	DNF2	12	16	DNF1	㉔	20	11	16	84
22	(Austria) Roland Leitinger	80	DNS								80
23	(Italy) Giovanni Borsotti	DNF1	13	DSQ1	9	14	DNS	7	12	DNF1	55
24	(France) Thibaut Favrot	4	15	8	DNF2	20	⑤	DNQ	4	0	51
25	(Austria) Raphael Haaser	DNF1	11	DNQ	15	DNS	⑪	14	DNF1	DNF1	40
26	(France) Victor Muffat-Jeandet	DNQ	24	DNQ	14	DNS				NE	38
27	(Norway) Fabian Wilkens Solheim	DNF1	DNQ	9	4	18	DNS	5	DNF1	NE	36
28	(France) Cyprien Sarrazin	8	DNF1	DNQ	DNQ	26	DNF1	DNQ	DNQ	NE	34
29	(Norway) Leif Kristian Nestvold-Haugen	7	7	2	DNQ	5	DNS	DNQ	13	NE	34
30	(Switzerland) Daniel Sette	10	8	5	5	4	DNS	DNQ	DNQ	NE	32
	References										

- Winner
- 2nd place
- 3rd place
- DNS = Did not start
- DNQ = Did not qualify for run 2
- DNF1 = Did not finish run 1
- DSQ1 = Disqualified run 1
- DNF2 = Did not finish run 2
- DSQ2 = Disqualified run 2
- Not Eligible for finals (NE)
- FIS non-World Cup race (Winter Olympics)

Updated at 19 March 2022 after all events.

== See also ==
- 2022 Alpine Skiing World Cup – Men's summary rankings
- 2022 Alpine Skiing World Cup – Men's overall
- 2022 Alpine Skiing World Cup – Men's downhill
- 2022 Alpine Skiing World Cup – Men's super-G
- 2022 Alpine Skiing World Cup – Men's slalom
- 2022 Alpine Skiing World Cup – Men's parallel
- World Cup scoring system
