= 2022 Alpine Skiing World Cup – Men's slalom =

Alpine ski discipline year standings

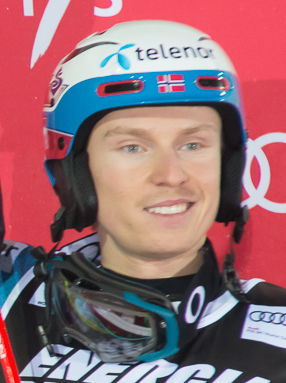
2022 Men's slalom World Cup: Henrik Kristoffersen of Norway, season champion; 2022 Men's World Cup; Overall • Downhill • Super-G; Giant slalom • Slalom • Parallel
Previous: 2021	Next: 2023

The men's slalom in the 2022 FIS Alpine Skiing World Cup consisted of ten events including the final. However, the slalom scheduled in Zagreb on 5 January was first delayed until 6 January due to bad weather and then cancelled in the middle of the first run (after 19 skiers) due to additional bad weather, leading to its removal from the schedule. Eventually, however, it was rescheduled for Flachau on 9 March, restoring the season to 10 events.

Going into the break for the 2022 Winter Olympics, the leader after two-thirds of the events was Lucas Braathen from Norway, who held a slim lead over his countryman Sebastian Foss-Solevåg. However, eight racers were still within 100 points (one race) of the lead. After the Olympics, the next two races were both won by another Norwegian, 2020 discipline champion Henrik Kristoffersen, who took over the lead with only two races remaining in the season. Kristofferson then won the season championship by finishing second in the final.

As discussed above, the season was interrupted by the 2022 Winter Olympics in Beijing, China (at the Yanqing National Alpine skiing Centre in Yanqing District) from 6–19 February 2022. The men's slalom was held at the "Ice River" course on 16 February 2022.

The World Cup final was held on Sunday, 20 March in the linked resorts of Courchevel and Méribel, France, which are located in Les Trois Vallées, on the Roc de Fer course at Méribel. Only the top 25 skiers in the World Cup downhill discipline and the winner of the Junior World Championship, plus athletes who have scored at least 500 points in the World Cup overall classification for the season, are eligible to compete in the final, and only the top 15 earn World Cup points.

== Standings ==
	Venue	12 Dec 2021; Val d'Isère	22 Dec 2021; Madonna di Campiglio	9 Jan 2022; Adelboden	16 Jan 2022; Wengen	22 Jan 2022; Kitzbühel	25 Jan 2022; Schladming	16 Feb 2022; Beijing	26 Feb 2022; Garmisch	27 Feb 2022; Garmisch	9 Mar 2022; Flachau	20 Mar 2022; Méribel	
#	Skier	(France)	(Italy)	(Switzerland)	(Switzerland)	(Austria)	(Austria)	(China)	(Germany)	(Germany)	(Austria)	(France)	Total
	(Norway) Henrik Kristoffersen	24	DNF2	22	DNF2	60	50	④	100	100	15	80	451
2	(Austria) Manuel Feller	DNF2	DNF1	80	45	DNS	60	DNF1	60	16	40	60	361
3	(Norway) Atle Lie McGrath	32	DNF1	DNS	DNQ	DNF1	80	㉛	26	10	100	100	348
4	(Norway) Lucas Braathen	26	11	18	100	80	22	DNF1	DNF1	50	16	24	347
5	(Germany) Linus Straßer	DNQ	DNF1	60	DNF2	18	100	⑦	40	60	29	0	307
6	(Switzerland) Daniel Yule	50	DNQ	32	80	DNF2	16	⑥	45	DNF2	60	DNF1	283
	(Switzerland) Loïc Meillard	DNF1	40	40	36	36	15	⑤	80	DNF2	14	22	283
8	(United Kingdom) Dave Ryding	45	DNF2	DNF2	15	100	11	⑬	11	80	DNF2	0	262
9	(France) Clément Noël	100	DSQ2	DNF1	32	16	29	①	DNF2	DNF1	80	DNF2	257
10	(Norway) Sebastian Foss-Solevåg	40	100	DNF1	40	DNF2	40	③	DNF1	DNF2	32	0	252
11	(Austria) Johannes Strolz	DNF1	DNF2	100	DNF2	45	DNF1	②	50	DNF2	50	DNF1	245
12	(Austria) Marco Schwarz	DNQ	DNF1	24	26	22	14	⑰	15	45	45	29	220
13	(Italy) Alex Vinatzer	DSQ2	50	36	DNF2	13	45	DNF2	36	29	DNQ	0	209
14	(Italy) Tommaso Sala	22	22	9	11	40	36	⑪	18	12	DNQ	36	206
15	(Italy) Giuliano Razzoli	29	36	29	60	DNF2	DNF2	⑧	10	40	DNF2	0	204
16	(France) Alexis Pinturault	DNQ2	80	DNF2	29	DNF2	DNF1	⑯	16	22	18	18	183
17	(Austria) Michael Matt	DNQ	11	DNQ	24	50	DNS	DNF2	29	29	12	26	181
18	(Norway) Timon Haugan	20	45	DNQ	DNF1	DNQ	18	DNS	9	24	24	40	180
19	(Sweden) Kristoffer Jakobsen	80	60	DNF1	DNF1	DNF2	DNF2	DNF1	DNF2	DNF1	DNF1	20	160
20	(Spain) Joaquim Salarich	16	16	DNF1	DNQ	DNQ	DNF1	DNF1	32	36	7	45	152
21	(Bulgaria) Albert Popov	15	24	DNS	22	DNF1	24	⑨	12	DNF1	DNF1	50	147
22	(Croatia) Filip Zubčić	60	15	16	DNQ	26	DNF1	⑱	20	DNF2	8	0	145
23	(United States) Luke Winters	6	DNQ	26	DNQ	24	5	DNF1	DNQ	DNQ	36	32	129
24	(Switzerland) Luca Aerni	DNF1	14	45	DNF2	20	20	⑭	DNF2	DNF1	26	0	125
25	(Switzerland) Ramon Zenhäusern	9	13	50	16	DNF2	13	⑫	7	DNF2	10	DNF2	118
26	(Austria) Fabio Gstrein	18	7	DNF2	50	DNQ	DNF1	DNS	DNQ	DNF1	22	16	113
27	(Canada) Erik Read	14	20	DNQ	9	DNF1	DNF1	㉔	13	15	13	NE	84
28	(Russia) Aleksandr Khoroshilov	DNQ	8	12	12	DNF1	32	⑩	DNF2	18	DNS	NE	82
29	(Belgium) Armand Marchant	36	18	DNQ	13	DNQ	DNF1	㉒	DNQ	DNF1	4	NE	71
30	(Switzerland) Marc Rochat	DNF1	DNQ	13	14	32	6	DNS	DNF1	DNF1	5	NE	70
	References												

- Winner
- 2nd place
- 3rd place
- DNS = Did not start
- DNQ = Did not qualify for run 2
- DNF1 = Did not finish run 1
- DNF2 = Did not finish run 2
- DSQ1 = Disqualified run 1
- DSQ2 = Disqualified run 2
- Not Eligible for finals (NE)
- FIS non-World Cup race (Winter Olympics)

Updated at 20 March 2021 after all events.

== See also ==
- 2022 Alpine Skiing World Cup – Men's summary rankings
- 2022 Alpine Skiing World Cup – Men's overall
- 2022 Alpine Skiing World Cup – Men's downhill
- 2022 Alpine Skiing World Cup – Men's super-G
- 2022 Alpine Skiing World Cup – Men's giant slalom
- 2022 Alpine Skiing World Cup – Men's parallel
- World Cup scoring system
