= 2022 Alpine Skiing World Cup – Men's downhill =

Alpine ski discipline year standings

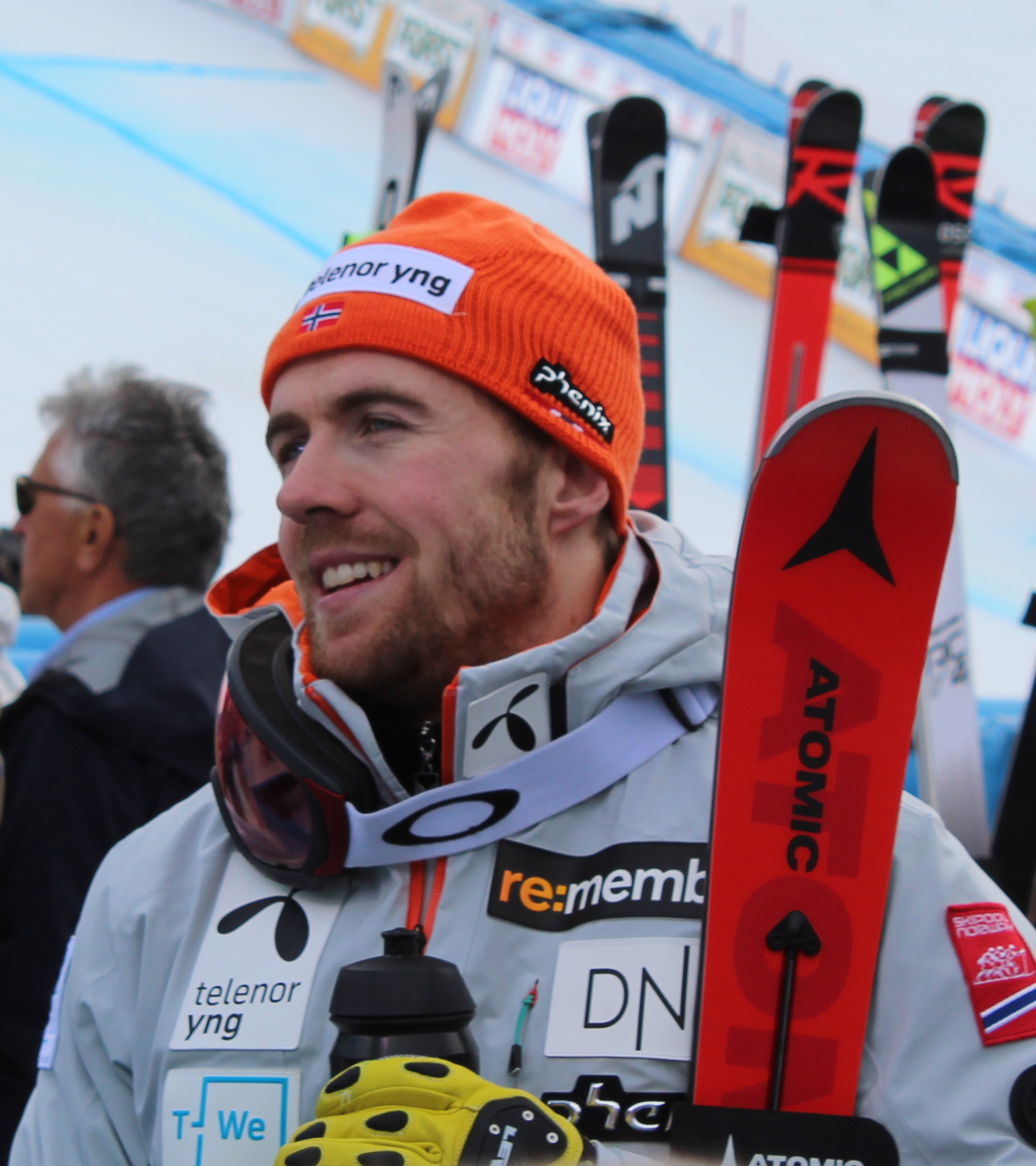
2022 Men's downhill World Cup: Aleksander Aamodt Kilde of Norway, season champion; 2022 Men's World Cup; Overall • Downhill • Super-G; Giant slalom • Slalom • Parallel
Previous: 2021	Next: 2023

The men's downhill in the 2022 FIS Alpine Skiing World Cup included eleven events including the final. A scheduled downhill on 5 December 2021 at Beaver Creek, Colorado was cancelled due to bad weather, but after several abortive attempts to run it at other venues, it was finally added to Kvitfjell on March 4, the day before the previously scheduled race.

The season was interrupted by the 2022 Winter Olympics in Beijing, China (at the Yanqing National Alpine skiing Centre in Yanqing District) from 6–19 February 2022. The men's downhill was held at the "Rock" course on 7 February 2022.

After ten events, with just the season final remaining, Aleksander Aamodt Kilde of Norway had won three times and was clinging to a 23-point lead over four-time defending champion Beat Feuz of Switzerland going into the final, with Matthias Mayer of Austria and Dominik Paris of Italy also still alive. In the final, Kilde finished fourth for 50 points, but Feuz could only manage to finish third for 60 points, allowing Kilde to win by 13 points and giving him a sweep of the speed titles for the season, as he had already won the Super-G championship.

The season final took place on 16 March 2022 at Courchevel, France, on the new L'Éclipse course. Only the top 25 in the downhill discipline ranking and the winner of the Junior World Championship, plus athletes who have scored at least 500 points in the World Cup overall classification, are eligible to compete in the final, and only the top 15 earn points there.

== Standings ==
	Venue	27 Nov 2021; Lake Louise	4 Dec 2021; Beaver Creek	18 Dec 2021; Val Gardena/Gröden	28 Dec 2021; Bormio	14 Jan 2022; Wengen	15 Jan 2022; Wengen	21 Jan 2022; Kitzbühel	22 Jan 2022; Kitzbühel	7 Feb 2022; Beijing	4 Mar 2022; Kvitfjell	5 Mar 2022; Kvitfjell	16 Mar 2022; Courchevel	
#	Skier	(Canada)	(United States)	(Italy)	(Italy)	(Switzerland)	(Switzerland)	(Austria)	(Austria)	(China)	(Norway)	(Norway)	(France)	Total
	(Norway) Aleksander Aamodt Kilde	29	100	DNF	40	100	36	100	40	⑤	45	80	50	620
2	(Switzerland) Beat Feuz	60	60	45	DNF	60	80	32	100	①	50	60	60	607
3	(Italy) Dominik Paris	32	45	50	100	29	60	4	36	⑥	26	100	40	522
4	(Switzerland) Marco Odermatt	50	16	DNS	80	80	50	45	80	⑦	16	20	80	517
5	(Austria) Matthias Mayer	100	80	15	22	40	45	50	50	③	60	24	22	508
6	(Austria) Vincent Kriechmayr	80	29	18	36	22	100	20	20	⑧	0	40	100	465
7	(Switzerland) Niels Hintermann	22	36	60	60	13	20	29	32	⑯	100	60	DNF	432
8	(Austria) Daniel Hemetsberger	18	32	10	50	50	24	26	60	㉑	9	22	45	346
9	(France) Johan Clarey	10	13	40	24	18	13	80	45	②	40	18	0	301
10	(United States) Ryan Cochran-Siegle	26	40	4	11	32	16	0	DNF	⑭	24	45	32	230
11	(United States) Travis Ganong	5	7	16	32	11	0	36	24	⑳	22	32	26	211
12	(United States) Bryce Bennett	5	9	100	0	36	10	24	22	⑲	0	0	0	206
13	(Austria) Otmar Striedinger	16	10	80	20	10	29	15	DNF	DNS	0	4	18	202
14	(Austria) Max Franz	45	6	26	DNF	45	26	0	18	⑨	3	10	16	195
15	(Austria) Daniel Danklmaier	15	24	0	29	5	15	DNF	26	DNS	36	2	29	181
16	(Canada) James Crawford	7	1	3	6	15	18	40	8	④	20	16	36	170
17	(Italy) Matteo Marsaglia	0	50	0	26	9	3	22	14	⑮	0	0	24	148
	(Germany) Dominik Schwaiger	8	24	1	45	7	14	18	9	DNF	0	0	22	148
19	(Germany) Romed Baumann	40	8	13	9	4	12	6	16	⑬	15	14	0	137
20	(Italy) Christof Innerhofer	6	18	14	0	20	22	14	29	DNF	0	9	0	132
21	(Canada) Cameron Alexander	0	DNS			0	0	DNS		DNS	100	15	0	115
22	(Germany) Josef Ferstl	12	5	29	15	0	1	0	11	㉓	7	26	0	106
23	(Slovenia) Martin Čater	0	20	9	0	26	40	9	DNF	DNS	0	0	0	104
24	(Slovenia) Boštjan Kline	24	14	24	10	0	11	DNS		⑩	0	12	0	95
25	(Switzerland) Stefan Rogentin	14	3	5	8	16	32	0	0	㉕	14	0	0	92
26	(France) Maxence Muzaton	3	4	11	0	0	0	13	13	⑪	10	32	NE	86
27	(Germany) Simon Jocher	1	0	32	DNF	0	7	2	0	DNS	36	0	NE	78
28	(France) Matthieu Bailet	36	2	0	18	0	4	DNF	DNS	㉗	12	4	NE	76
29	(Italy) Mattia Casse	0	0	36	14	14	2	5	0	DNS	0	DNF	NE	71
	(France) Blaise Giezendanner	0	0	0	5	0	0	60	2	㉖	4	0	NE	71
	References													

- Winner
- 2nd place
- 3rd place
- DNF = Did not finish
- DNS = Did not start
- Not Eligible for finals (NE)
- FIS non-World Cup race (Winter Olympics)
- Updated at 16 March 2022, after all events.

== See also ==
- 2022 Alpine Skiing World Cup – Men's summary rankings
- 2022 Alpine Skiing World Cup – Men's overall
- 2022 Alpine Skiing World Cup – Men's super-G
- 2022 Alpine Skiing World Cup – Men's giant slalom
- 2022 Alpine Skiing World Cup – Men's slalom
- 2022 Alpine Skiing World Cup – Men's parallel
- World Cup scoring system
