= 2022 Alpine Skiing World Cup – Men's super-G =

Alpine ski discipline year standings

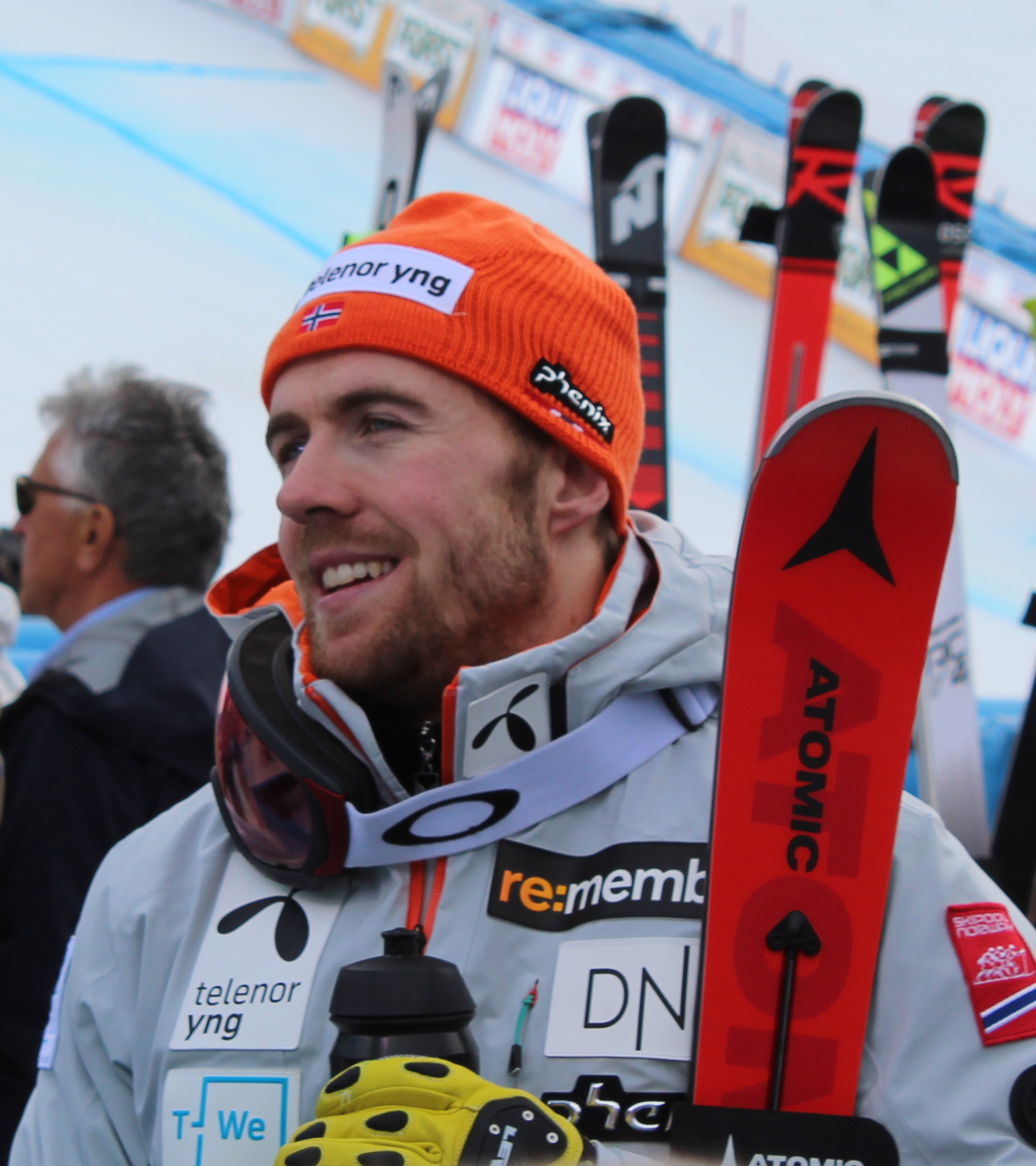
2022 Men's Super-G World Cup: Aleksander Aamodt Kilde of Norway, season champion; 2022 Men's World Cup; Overall • Downhill • Super-G; Giant slalom • Slalom • Parallel
Previous: 2021	Next: 2023

The men's super-G in the 2022 FIS Alpine Skiing World Cup consisted of seven events including the final. A race originally scheduled for Lake Louise in November and then rescheduled to Bormio in December was cancelled twice and was thought unlikely to be rescheduled, potentially reducing the season to six events. However, the race was rescheduled to Wengen on 13 January 2022. After this race, 2016 champion Aleksander Aamodt Kilde of Norway had won three of the five completed races (but failed to complete one) and led the discipline; two other races were within 100 points (one race win) of his lead, although no one was closer than 60 points behind. Kilde then clinched the discipline championship for the season in front of a home crowd by winning the next-to-last race of the season in Kvitfjell.

The season was interrupted by the 2022 Winter Olympics in Beijing, China (at the Yanqing National Alpine Skiing Centre in Yanqing District) from 6–19 February 2022. Each nation is limited to no more than four competitors per event. The men's super-G was held at the "Rock" course on 8 February 2022.

The season final took place on 17 March 2022 in Courchevel, France, on the new L'Éclipse course. Only the top 25 in the Super-G discipline ranking and the winner of the Junior World Championship are eligible to compete in the final, except that athletes who have scored at least 500 points in the overall classification could participate in all specialties, and only the top 15 score points. Due to injuries, only 22 of the top 25 competed.

== Standings ==
	Venue	2 Dec 2021; Beaver Creek	3 Dec 2021; Beaver Creek	17 Dec 2021; Val Gardena/Gröden	29 Dec 2021; Bormio	13 Jan 2022; Wengen	8 Feb 2022; Beijing	6 Mar 2022; Kvitfjell	17 Mar 2022; Courchevel	
#	Skier	(United States)	(United States)	(Italy)	(Italy)	(Switzerland)	(China)	(Norway)	(France)	Total
	(Norway) Aleksander Aamodt Kilde	DNF	100	100	100	80	③	100	50	530
2	(Switzerland) Marco Odermatt	100	80	7	32	100	DNF	3	80	402
3	(Austria) Vincent Kriechmayr	45	45	60	60	29	⑤	36	100	375
4	(Austria) Matthias Mayer	80	50	80	20	60	①	60	22	372
5	(Canada) James Crawford	2	22	32	0	45	⑥	80	45	226
6	(Switzerland) Beat Feuz	22	18	50	45	7	DNF	45	26	213
7	(Switzerland) Stefan Rogentin	22	0	45	36	24	⑭	20	26	173
8	(Austria) Raphael Haaser	24	32	5	80	9	DNF	0	20	170
9	(Italy) Dominik Paris	DNF	7	40	7	36	㉑	50	18	158
10	(United States) Ryan Cochran-Siegle	12	DNF	29	50	0	②	24	36	151
11	(Switzerland) Gino Caviezel	26	29	0	24	DNS	⑯	0	60	139
12	(Germany) Andreas Sander	50	26	13	12	0	⑧	20	16	137
13	(France) Matthieu Bailet	DNF	36	0	40	5	DNF	14	40	135
14	(United States) Travis Ganong	9	60	26	13	12	⑫	10	0	130
15	(France) Alexis Pinturault	40	40	DNS	8	DNS	⑪	DNS	32	120
16	(Switzerland) Justin Murisier	32	DNF	0	2	5	DNS	40	29	108
17	(Germany) Romed Baumann	DNF	DNF	11	5	50	⑦	26	0	92
18	(Norway) Adrian Smiseth Sejersted	36	20	0	0	2	④	32	DNS	90
19	(Austria) Daniel Danklmaier	5	8	18	16	26	DNS	15	0	88
20	(Canada) Broderick Thompson	60	11	0	0	0	DNF	16	0	87
21	(Germany) Josef Ferstl	0	5	24	10	40	⑱	7	0	86
22	(Austria) Max Franz	DNF	DNF	36	22	22	DNF	0	DNS	80
23	(Italy) Mattia Casse	29	14	8	26	0	DNS	DNS		77
	(Italy) Christof Innerhofer	0	13	3	20	32	DNF	9	0	77
25	(France) Blaise Giezendanner	14	15	0	29	0	⑨	11	DNF	69
26	(France) Nils Allègre	6	24	16	4	6	㉖	12	NE	68
27	(Switzerland) Niels Hintermann	1	DNF	12	DNF	18	DNF	29	NE	60
28	(Austria) Stefan Babinsky	7	3	9	0	15	DNS	24	NE	58
29	(Austria) Christian Walder	18	6	6	3	20	DNS	0	NE	53
30	(Switzerland) Loïc Meillard	0	11	0	16	16	DNS	DNS	NE	43
31	(France) Johan Clarey	DNS		14	14	13	DNS	DNF	NE	41
32	(Canada) Brodie Seger	DNF	5	20	0	14	DNF	DNF	NE	39
33	(Germany) Simon Jocher	3	DNF	16	9	8	⑬	2	NE	38
	References									

- Winner
- 2nd place
- 3rd place
- DNF = Did not finish
- DNS = Did not start
- Not Eligible for finals (NE)
- FIS non-World Cup race (Winter Olympics)
- Updated at 17 March 2022, after all events.

== See also ==
- 2022 Alpine Skiing World Cup – Men's summary rankings
- 2022 Alpine Skiing World Cup – Men's overall
- 2022 Alpine Skiing World Cup – Men's downhill
- 2022 Alpine Skiing World Cup – Men's giant slalom
- 2022 Alpine Skiing World Cup – Men's slalom
- 2022 Alpine Skiing World Cup – Men's parallel
- World Cup scoring system
