= 2021–22 FIS Alpine Ski World Cup =

International sports competition

Discipline	Men	Women
Overall	(Switzerland) Marco Odermatt (1)	(United States) Mikaela Shiffrin (4)
Downhill	(Norway) Aleksander Aamodt Kilde (1)	(Italy) Sofia Goggia (3)
Super-G	(Norway) Aleksander Aamodt Kilde (2)	(Italy) Federica Brignone (1)
Giant slalom	(Switzerland) Marco Odermatt (1)	(France) Tessa Worley (2)
Slalom	(Norway) Henrik Kristoffersen (3)	(Slovakia) Petra Vlhová (2)
Parallel (PGS) (Note: To award an event World Cup trophy at least two (2) events must be held in the current season.)	(Austria) Christian Hirschbühl (1)	(Slovenia) Andreja Slokar (1)
Nations Cup	Switzerland (8)	Austria (34)
- Nations Cup Overall: Austria (42)

Competition
Locations	19 venues	20 venues
Individual	37 events	37 events
Mixed	1 event	1 event
Cancelled	6 events	3 events
Rescheduled	9 events	4 events

Overall champions

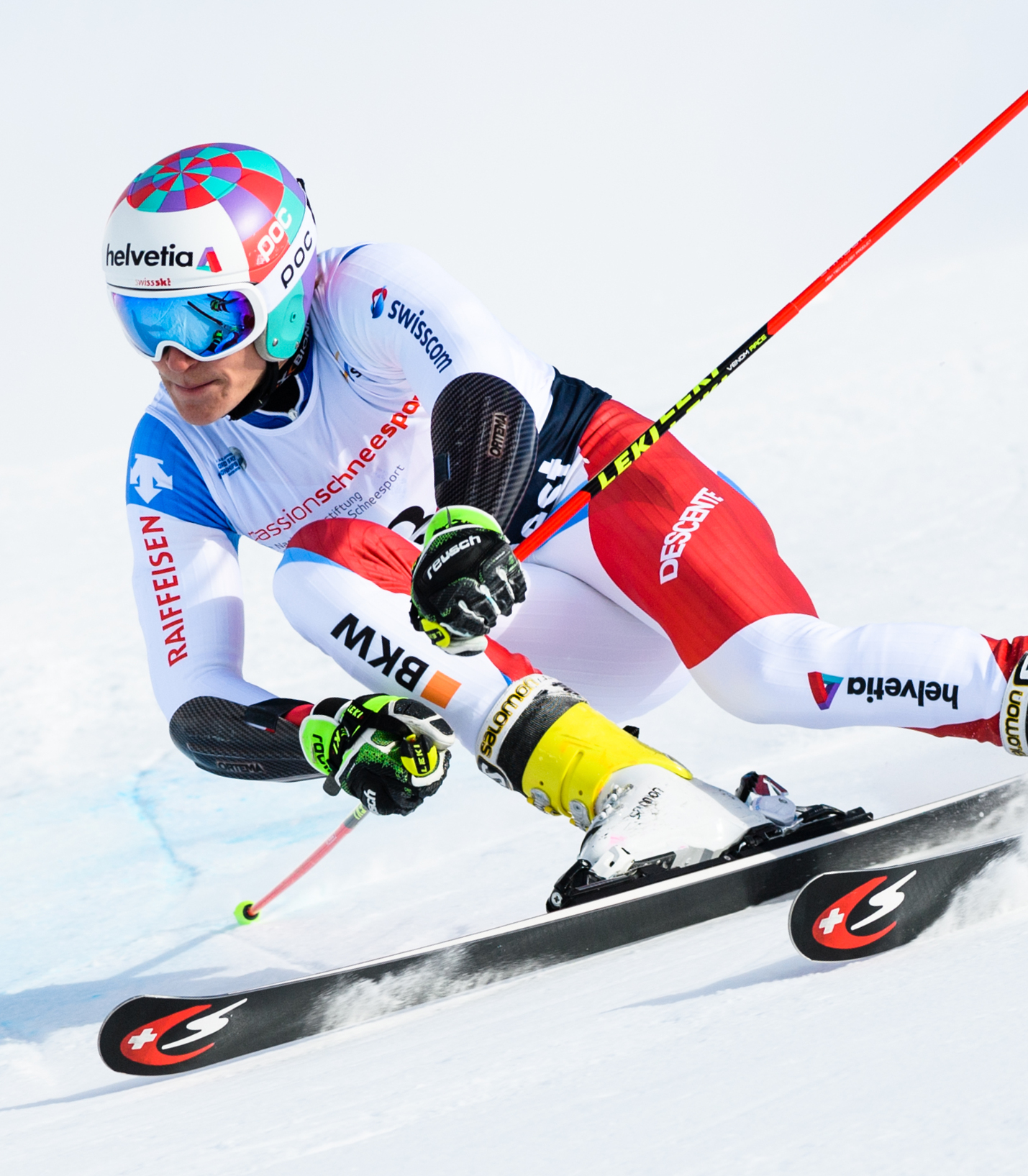
Marco Odermatt became the first Swiss skier to win an overall World Cup title since Carlo Janka in 2009–10.

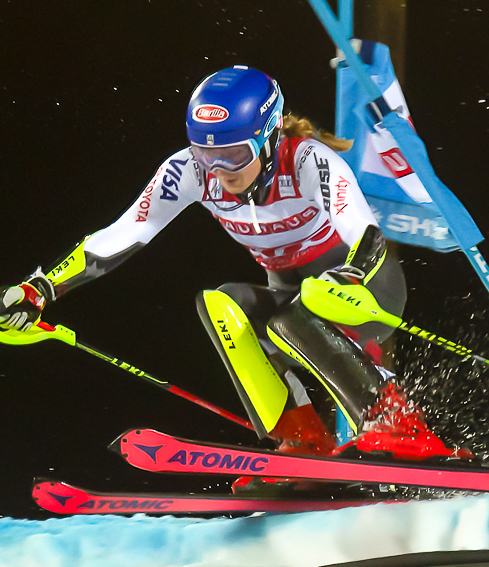
Mikaela Shiffrin won her fourth overall World Cup title in history.

The International Ski Federation (FIS) Alpine Ski World Cup was the premier circuit for alpine skiing competition. The inaugural season launched in January 1967, and the 2021–22 season marked the 56th consecutive year for the FIS World Cup.

This season began in October 2021 in Sölden, Austria, and concluded in mid-March 2022 at the finals in Courchevel/Méribel, France. It was interrupted for most of February by the Winter Olympics in Beijing, China; events were held at Xiaohaituo Alpine Skiing Field.

Alexis Pinturault and Petra Vlhová were the defending overall champions, but first-time overall winner Marco Odermatt won the 2022 men's championship with three races to go and Mikaela Shiffrin won the 2022 women's championship for her fourth overall title with two races to go.

For the first time in the history of the World Cup, either for men or for women, Beaver Creek is hosting four speed events four days in a row, with two downhills and two super giant slaloms. Ultimately, though, one of those races was cancelled by bad weather.

For the first time in almost four years (28 January 2018, Lenzerheide) Mikaela Shiffrin didn't finish her second run (SL in Kranjska Gora). With her 47th slalom victory on 11 January in Schladming, Shiffrin set a new all-time record for victories in any single discipline in the history of the World Cup, surpassing Ingemar Stenmark and his 46 wins in the giant slalom.

Austrian skier Johannes Strolz became the 300th different race winner in men's World Cup history by taking his first career win (SL) at Adelboden.

An oddity occurred when Lucas Braathen won the slalom in Wengen after being in 29th place after the first run.

Dave Ryding, after winning the slalom in Kitzbühel, became the first British skier ever to win a World Cup event and at 35 years old, the oldest first-time World Cup winner.

On 1 March 2022, following the 2022 Russian invasion of Ukraine, FIS decided to exclude athletes from Russia and Belarus from FIS competitions, with an immediate effect.

== Map of world cup hosts ==
All 31 locations hosting world cup events for men (19), for women (21) and shared (10) in this season.

(Austria) Sölden	(Austria) Lech/Zürs	(Canada) Lake Louise	(United States) Beaver Creek	(France) Val d'Isère	
Rettenbach	Flexenarena	Men's Olympic Downhill	Birds of Prey	La face de Bellevarde	Piste Oreiller-Killy
(Italy) Val Gardena/Gröden	(Italy) Alta Badia	(Italy) Madonna di Campiglio	(Italy) Bormio	(Switzerland) Adelboden	(Slovenia) Kranjska Gora
Saslong	Gran Risa	Canalone Miramonti	Stelvio	Chuenisbärgli	Podkoren 3
Europe				North America France	
North Italy		Austria		Switzerland	
(Slovenia) Maribor	(Austria) Schladming	(Austria) Kitzbühel		(Switzerland) Wengen	
Miranova proga A	Planai	Streif	Ganslern	Lauberhorn	Männlichen
(United States) Killington	(Finland) Levi	(Italy) Cortina d'Ampezzo	(Croatia) Zagreb	(Germany) Garmisch-Partenkirchen	
Superstar	Levi Black	Olimpia delle Tofane	Crveni spust	Kandahar 1	Gudiberg

Women Men Shared

== Men ==
The number of races in the World Cup history

Total	DH	SG	GS	SL	AC	PS	PG	CE	K.O.	Winners
1854	514	229	437	518	134	2	8	10	1	303

after SL in Méribel (20 March 2022)

=== Calendar ===
Event key: DH – Downhill, SL – Slalom, GS – Giant slalom, SG – Super giant slalom, PG – Parallel giant slalom
All	No.	Date	Venue (slope %)	Type	Winner	Second	Third	Overall leader	R.
1818	1	24 October 2021	(Austria) Sölden (Rettenbach 68.2%)	GS _{430}	(Switzerland) Marco Odermatt	(Austria) Roland Leitinger	(Slovenia) Žan Kranjec	(Switzerland) Marco Odermatt	
1819	2	14 November 2021	(Austria) Lech/Zürs; Flexenarena 50%)	PG _{008}	(Austria) Christian Hirschbühl	(Austria) Dominik Raschner	(Norway) Atle Lie McGrath	(Austria) Christian Hirschbühl (Switzerland) Marco Odermatt	
		26 November 2021	(Canada) Lake Louise (Men's Olympic Downhill 53%)	DH _{cnx}	cancelled due to heavy snow (moved to Beaver Creek on 5 December)			—	
1820	3	27 November 2021	(Canada) Lake Louise (Men's Olympic Downhill 53%)	DH _{504}	(Austria) Matthias Mayer	(Austria) Vincent Kriechmayr	(Switzerland) Beat Feuz	(Switzerland) Marco Odermatt	
		28 November 2021	(Canada) Lake Louise (Men's Olympic Downhill 53%)	SG _{cnx}	cancelled due to heavy snow (moved to Bormio on 30 December)			—	
1821	4	(Note: Men's super-G from Beaver Creek originally scheduled for December 5, 2021 was rescheduled to December 2, 2021 due to program change with additional downhill.)2 December 2021	(United States) Beaver Creek (Birds of Prey 68%)	SG _{224}	(Switzerland) Marco Odermatt	(Austria) Matthias Mayer	(Canada) Broderick Thompson	(Switzerland) Marco Odermatt	
1822	5	3 December 2021	(United States) Beaver Creek (Birds of Prey 68%)	SG _{225}	(Norway) Aleksander Aamodt Kilde	(Switzerland) Marco Odermatt	(United States) Travis Ganong	(Switzerland) Marco Odermatt	
1823	6	4 December 2021	(United States) Beaver Creek (Birds of Prey 68%)	DH _{505}	(Norway) Aleksander Aamodt Kilde	(Austria) Matthias Mayer	(Switzerland) Beat Feuz	(Switzerland) Marco Odermatt	
		(Note: Men's downhill from Lake Louise originally scheduled for December 5, 2021 was rescheduled to Beaver Creek.)5 December 2021	(United States) Beaver Creek (Birds of Prey 68%)	DH _{cnx}	rescheduled DH from Lake Louise cancelled due to strong wind (moved to Kvitfjell on 4 March)			—	
1824	7	11 December 2021	(France) Val d'Isère (La face de Bellevarde 71%)	GS _{431}	(Switzerland) Marco Odermatt	(France) Alexis Pinturault	(Austria) Manuel Feller	(Switzerland) Marco Odermatt	
1825	8	12 December 2021	(France) Val d'Isère (La face de Bellevarde 71%)	SL _{509}	(France) Clément Noël	(Sweden) Kristoffer Jakobsen	(Croatia) Filip Zubčić	(Switzerland) Marco Odermatt	
1826	9	17 December 2021	(Italy) Val Gardena/Gröden (Saslong 56.9%)	SG _{226}	(Norway) Aleksander Aamodt Kilde	(Austria) Matthias Mayer	(Austria) Vincent Kriechmayr	(Switzerland) Marco Odermatt	
1827	10	18 December 2021	(Italy) Val Gardena/Gröden (Saslong 56.9%)	DH _{506}	(United States) Bryce Bennett	(Austria) Otmar Striedinger	(Switzerland) Niels Hintermann	(Switzerland) Marco Odermatt	
1828	11	19 December 2021	(Italy) Alta Badia (Gran Risa 69%)	GS _{432}	(Norway) Henrik Kristoffersen	(Switzerland) Marco Odermatt	(Austria) Manuel Feller	(Switzerland) Marco Odermatt	
1829	12	20 December 2021	(Italy) Alta Badia (Gran Risa 69%)	GS _{433}	(Switzerland) Marco Odermatt	(Italy) Luca De Aliprandini	(Germany) Alexander Schmid	(Switzerland) Marco Odermatt	
1830	13	22 December 2021	(Italy) M. di Campiglio (Canalone Miramonti 60%)	SL _{510}	(Norway) Sebastian Foss-Solevåg	(France) Alexis Pinturault	(Sweden) Kristoffer Jakobsen	(Switzerland) Marco Odermatt	
1831	14	28 December 2021	(Italy) Bormio (Stelvio 63%)	DH _{507}	(Italy) Dominik Paris	(Switzerland) Marco Odermatt	(Switzerland) Niels Hintermann	(Switzerland) Marco Odermatt	
1832	15	29 December 2021	(Italy) Bormio (Stelvio 63%)	SG _{227}	(Norway) Aleksander Aamodt Kilde	(Austria) Raphael Haaser	(Austria) Vincent Kriechmayr	(Switzerland) Marco Odermatt	
		(Note: Men's super-G from Lake Louise originally scheduled for November 28, 2021 was rescheduled on December 30, 2021 to Bormio.)30 December 2021	(Italy) Bormio (Stelvio 63%)	SG _{cnx}	rescheduled SG from Lake Louise due to warm weather (moved to Wengen on 13 January)			—	
		5 January 2022	(Croatia) Zagreb (Crveni spust)	SL _{cnx}	cancelled due to high temperatures and wind (rescheduled on next day on 6 January)			—	
		(Note: Men's slalom from Zagreb originally scheduled for January 5, 2022 was rescheduled on January 6, 2022)6 January 2022	(Croatia) Zagreb (Crveni spust)	SL _{cnx}	cancelled after 19 skiers in the 1st run due to snow conditions (moved to Flachau on 9 March)			—	
1833	16	8 January 2022	(Switzerland) Adelboden (Chuenisbärgli 60%)	GS _{434}	(Switzerland) Marco Odermatt	(Austria) Manuel Feller	(France) Alexis Pinturault	(Switzerland) Marco Odermatt	
1834	17	9 January 2022	(Switzerland) Adelboden (Chuenisbärgli 60%)	SL _{511}	(Austria) Johannes Strolz	(Austria) Manuel Feller	(Germany) Linus Straßer	(Switzerland) Marco Odermatt	
1835	18	(Note: Men's super-G from Bormio originally scheduled for December 30, 2021 was rescheduled on January 13, 2022 to Wengen.)13 January 2022	(Switzerland) Wengen (Lauberhorn 90%) (Männlichen 72%)	SG _{228}	(Switzerland) Marco Odermatt	(Norway) Aleksander Aamodt Kilde	(Austria) Matthias Mayer	(Switzerland) Marco Odermatt	
1836	19	14 January 2022	(Switzerland) Wengen (Lauberhorn 90%) (Männlichen 72%)	DH _{508}	(Norway) Aleksander Aamodt Kilde	(Switzerland) Marco Odermatt	(Switzerland) Beat Feuz	(Switzerland) Marco Odermatt	
1837	20	15 January 2022	(Switzerland) Wengen (Lauberhorn 90%) (Männlichen 72%)	DH _{509}	(Austria) Vincent Kriechmayr	(Switzerland) Beat Feuz	(Italy) Dominik Paris	(Switzerland) Marco Odermatt	
1838	21	16 January 2022	(Switzerland) Wengen (Lauberhorn 90%) (Männlichen 72%)	SL _{512}	(Norway) Lucas Braathen	(Switzerland) Daniel Yule	(Italy) Giuliano Razzoli	(Switzerland) Marco Odermatt	
1839	22	21 January 2022	(Austria) Kitzbühel (Streif 85%); Ganslern 70%)	DH _{510}	(Norway) Aleksander Aamodt Kilde	(France) Johan Clarey	(France) Blaise Giezendanner	(Switzerland) Marco Odermatt	
1840	23	(Note: Rescheduled from 23 January 2022.)22 January 2022	(Austria) Kitzbühel (Streif 85%); Ganslern 70%)	SL _{513}	(United Kingdom) Dave Ryding	(Norway) Lucas Braathen	(Norway) Henrik Kristoffersen	(Switzerland) Marco Odermatt	
1841	24	(Note: Rescheduled from 22 January 2022.)23 January 2022	(Austria) Kitzbühel (Streif 85%); Ganslern 70%)	DH _{511}	(Switzerland) Beat Feuz	(Switzerland) Marco Odermatt	(Austria) Daniel Hemetsberger	(Switzerland) Marco Odermatt	
1842	25	25 January 2022	(Austria) Schladming (Planai 54%)	SL _{514}	(Germany) Linus Straßer	(Norway) Atle Lie McGrath	(Austria) Manuel Feller	(Switzerland) Marco Odermatt	
2022 Winter Olympics (7 – 20 February • Beijing, China)
1843	26	26 February 2022	(Germany) Garmisch-Pa (Gudiberg 58%)	SL _{515}	(Norway) Henrik Kristoffersen	(Switzerland) Loïc Meillard	(Austria) Manuel Feller	(Switzerland) Marco Odermatt	
1844	27	27 February 2022	(Germany) Garmisch-Pa (Gudiberg 58%)	SL _{516}	(Norway) Henrik Kristoffersen	(United Kingdom) Dave Ryding	(Germany) Linus Straßer	(Switzerland) Marco Odermatt	
1845	28	(Note: Men's downhill from Lake Louise originally scheduled for 5 December 2021 was moved to Kvitfjell on 4 March 2022.)4 March 2022	(Norway) Kvitfjell (Olympiabakken 64%)	DH _{512}	(Canada) Cameron Alexander (Switzerland) Niels Hintermann		(Austria) Matthias Mayer	(Switzerland) Marco Odermatt	
1846	29	5 March 2022	(Norway) Kvitfjell (Olympiabakken 64%)	DH _{513}	(Italy) Dominik Paris	(Norway) Aleksander Aamodt Kilde	(Switzerland) Beat Feuz (Switzerland) Niels Hintermann	(Switzerland) Marco Odermatt	
1847	30	6 March 2022	(Norway) Kvitfjell (Olympiabakken 64%)	SG _{229}	(Norway) Aleksander Aamodt Kilde	(Canada) James Crawford	(Austria) Matthias Mayer	(Switzerland) Marco Odermatt	
1848	31	9 March 2022	(Austria) Flachau (H.-Maier-Weltcupstrecke 53%)	SL _{517}	(Norway) Atle Lie McGrath	(France) Clément Noël	(Switzerland) Daniel Yule	(Switzerland) Marco Odermatt	
1849	32	12 March 2022	(Slovenia) Kranjska Gora (Podkoren 3 59%)	GS _{435}	(Norway) Henrik Kristoffersen	(Norway) Lucas Braathen (Switzerland) Marco Odermatt		(Switzerland) Marco Odermatt	
1850	33	13 March 2022	(Slovenia) Kranjska Gora (Podkoren 3 59%)	GS _{436}	(Norway) Henrik Kristoffersen	(Austria) Stefan Brennsteiner	(Switzerland) Marco Odermatt	(Switzerland) Marco Odermatt	
World Cup Season Final
1851	34	16 March 2022	(France) Courchevel (L'Éclipse)	DH _{514}	(Austria) Vincent Kriechmayr	(Switzerland) Marco Odermatt	(Switzerland) Beat Feuz	(Switzerland) Marco Odermatt	
1852	35	17 March 2022	(France) Courchevel (L'Éclipse)	SG _{230}	(Austria) Vincent Kriechmayr	(Switzerland) Marco Odermatt	(Switzerland) Gino Caviezel	(Switzerland) Marco Odermatt	
1853	36	19 March 2022	(France) Méribel (Roc de Fer)	GS _{437}	(Switzerland) Marco Odermatt	(Norway) Lucas Braathen	(Switzerland) Loïc Meillard	(Switzerland) Marco Odermatt	
1854	37	20 March 2022	(France) Méribel (Roc de Fer)	SL _{518}	(Norway) Atle Lie McGrath	(Norway) Henrik Kristoffersen	(Austria) Manuel Feller	(Switzerland) Marco Odermatt	

=== Rankings ===
==== Overall ====
Rank	after all 37 races	Points
	(Switzerland) Marco Odermatt	1639
2	(Norway) Aleksander Aamodt Kilde	1172
3	(Norway) Henrik Kristoffersen	954
4	(Austria) Matthias Mayer	880
5	(Austria) Vincent Kriechmayr	840

==== Downhill ====
Rank	after all 11 races	Points
	(Norway) Aleksander Aamodt Kilde	620
2	(Switzerland) Beat Feuz	607
3	(Italy) Dominik Paris	522
4	(Switzerland) Marco Odermatt	517
5	(Austria) Matthias Mayer	508

==== Super-G ====
Rank	after all 7 races	Points
	(Norway) Aleksander Aamodt Kilde	530
2	(Switzerland) Marco Odermatt	402
3	(Austria) Vincent Kriechmayr	375
4	(Austria) Matthias Mayer	372
5	(Canada) James Crawford	226

==== Giant slalom ====
Rank	after all 8 races	Points
	(Switzerland) Marco Odermatt	720
2	(Norway) Henrik Kristoffersen	453
3	(Austria) Manuel Feller	326
4	(Norway) Lucas Braathen	308
5	(France) Alexis Pinturault	300

==== Slalom ====
Rank	after all 10 races	Points
	(Norway) Henrik Kristoffersen	451
2	(Austria) Manuel Feller	361
3	(Norway) Atle Lie McGrath	348
4	(Norway) Lucas Braathen	347
5	(Germany) Linus Straßer	307

==== Parallel (PG) ====
Rank	after all 1 race	Points
1	(Austria) Christian Hirschbühl	100
2	(Austria) Dominik Raschner	80
3	(Norway) Atle Lie McGrath	60
4	(Norway) Henrik Kristoffersen	50
5	(Canada) Trevor Philp	45

== Women ==
The number of races in the World Cup history

Total	DH	SG	GS	SL	AC	PS	PG	CE	K.O.	Winners
1734	433	253	435	487	106	6	3	10	1	254

after GS in Méribel (20 March 2022)

=== Calendar ===
Event key: DH – Downhill, SL – Slalom, GS – Giant slalom, SG – Super giant slalom, PG – Parallel giant slalom
All	No.	Date	Venue (slope %)	Type	Winner	Second	Third	Overall Leader	R.
1698	1	23 October 2021	(Austria) Sölden (Rettenbach 68.2%)	GS _{427}	(United States) Mikaela Shiffrin	(Switzerland) Lara Gut-Behrami	(Slovakia) Petra Vlhová	(United States) Mikaela Shiffrin	
1699	2	13 November 2021	(Austria) Lech/Zürs (Flexenarena50%)	PG _{003}	(Slovenia) Andreja Slokar	(Norway) Thea Louise Stjernesund	(Norway) Kristin Lysdahl	(Slovenia) Andreja Slokar	
1700	3	20 November 2021	(Finland) Levi (Levi Black 52%)	SL _{479}	(Slovakia) Petra Vlhová	(United States) Mikaela Shiffrin	(Germany) Lena Dürr	(United States) Mikaela Shiffrin	
1701	4	21 November 2021	(Finland) Levi (Levi Black 52%)	SL _{480}	(Slovakia) Petra Vlhová	(United States) Mikaela Shiffrin	(Germany) Lena Dürr	(Slovakia) Petra Vlhová (United States) Mikaela Shiffrin	
		27 November 2021	(United States) Killington (Superstar)	GS _{cnx}	cancelled in 1st run after 9 skiers due to strong wind (moved to Courchevel on 22 December)			—	
1702	5	28 November 2021	(United States) Killington (Superstar)	SL _{481}	(United States) Mikaela Shiffrin	(Slovakia) Petra Vlhová	(Switzerland) Wendy Holdener	(United States) Mikaela Shiffrin	
1703	6	3 December 2021	(Canada) Lake Louise (Men's Olympic Downhill 53%)	DH _{425}	(Italy) Sofia Goggia	(United States) Breezy Johnson	(Austria) Mirjam Puchner	(United States) Mikaela Shiffrin	
1704	7	4 December 2021	(Canada) Lake Louise (Men's Olympic Downhill 53%)	DH _{426}	(Italy) Sofia Goggia	(United States) Breezy Johnson	(Switzerland) Corinne Suter	(United States) Mikaela Shiffrin	
1705	8	5 December 2021	(Canada) Lake Louise (Men's Olympic Downhill 53%)	SG _{245}	(Italy) Sofia Goggia	(Switzerland) Lara Gut-Behrami	(Austria) Mirjam Puchner	(United States) Mikaela Shiffrin	
1706	9	11 December 2021	(Switzerland) St. Moritz (Corviglia (61%) (Note: Corviglia full downhill course in St. Moritz with "Free Fall", new start constructed by Bernhard Russi specially for W. Championships 2003, has the steepest incline in World Cup circuit with 45 degrees (100%). Super-G course has max. incline at 61%, due to lower start.)	SG _{246}	(Switzerland) Lara Gut-Behrami	(Italy) Sofia Goggia	(United States) Mikaela Shiffrin	(United States) Mikaela Shiffrin	
1707	10	12 December 2021	(Switzerland) St. Moritz (Corviglia (61%)	SG _{247}	(Italy) Federica Brignone	(Italy) Elena Curtoni	(United States) Mikaela Shiffrin	(United States) Mikaela Shiffrin	
1708	11	18 December 2021	(France) Val d'Isère (Piste Oreiller-Killy 52%)	DH _{427}	(Italy) Sofia Goggia	(United States) Breezy Johnson	(Austria) Mirjam Puchner	(Italy) Sofia Goggia	
1709	12	19 December 2021	(France) Val d'Isère (Piste Oreiller-Killy 52%)	SG _{248}	(Italy) Sofia Goggia	(Norway) Ragnhild Mowinckel	(Italy) Elena Curtoni	(Italy) Sofia Goggia	
1710	13	21 December 2021	(France) Courchevel (Stade Émile-Allais 58.5%)	GS _{428}	(United States) Mikaela Shiffrin	(Sweden) Sara Hector	(Switzerland) Michelle Gisin	(United States) Mikaela Shiffrin	
1711	14	(Note: Women's cancelled giant slalom from Killington, was rescheduled on December 22, 2021 to Courchevel.)22 December 2021	(France) Courchevel (Stade Émile-Allais 58.5%)	GS _{429}	(Sweden) Sara Hector	(United States) Mikaela Shiffrin	(Italy) Marta Bassino	(United States) Mikaela Shiffrin	
1712	15	28 December 2021	(Austria) Lienz (Schlossberg 47%)	GS _{430}	(France) Tessa Worley	(Slovakia) Petra Vlhová	(Sweden) Sara Hector	(United States) Mikaela Shiffrin	
1713	16	29 December 2021	(Austria) Lienz (Schlossberg 47%)	SL _{482}	(Slovakia) Petra Vlhová	(Austria) Katharina Liensberger	(Switzerland) Michelle Gisin	(United States) Mikaela Shiffrin	
1714	17	4 January 2022	(Croatia) Zagreb (Crveni spust)	SL _{483}	(Slovakia) Petra Vlhová	(United States) Mikaela Shiffrin	(Austria) Katharina Liensberger	(United States) Mikaela Shiffrin	
		8 January 2022	(Slovenia) Maribor (Miranova proga A)	GS _{cnx}	cancelled due to warm weather and lack of snow (both replaced in Kranjska Gora on the same dates)			—	
		9 January 2022	(Slovenia) Maribor (Miranova proga A)	SL _{cnx}	cancelled due to warm weather and lack of snow (both replaced in Kranjska Gora on the same dates)			—	
1715	18	(Note: Women's cancelled slalom and giant slalom from Maribor originally scheduled on January 8 and 9, 2022 respectively, will be replaced on the same date in Kranjska Gora.)8 January 2022	(Slovenia) Kranjska Gora (Podkoren 3 59%)	GS _{431}	(Sweden) Sara Hector	(France) Tessa Worley	(Italy) Marta Bassino	(United States) Mikaela Shiffrin	
1716	19	9 January 2022	(Slovenia) Kranjska Gora (Podkoren 3 59%)	SL _{484}	(Slovakia) Petra Vlhová	(Switzerland) Wendy Holdener	(Sweden) Anna Swenn-Larsson	(United States) Mikaela Shiffrin	
		11 January 2022	(Austria) Flachau (H.-Maier-Weltcupstrecke 53%)	SL _{cnx}	extreme high COVID-19 numbers (replaced in Schladming on the same date)			—	
1717	20	(Note: Moved from Flachau to Schladming.)11 January 2022	(Austria) Schladming (Planai 54%)	SL _{485}	(United States) Mikaela Shiffrin	(Slovakia) Petra Vlhová	(Germany) Lena Dürr	(United States) Mikaela Shiffrin	
1718	21	15 January 2022	(Austria) Zauchensee (Kälberloch 70%)	DH _{428}	(Switzerland) Lara Gut-Behrami	(Germany) Kira Weidle	(Austria) Ramona Siebenhofer	(United States) Mikaela Shiffrin	
1719	22	16 January 2022	(Austria) Zauchensee (Kälberloch 70%)	SG _{249}	(Italy) Federica Brignone	(Switzerland) Corinne Suter	(Austria) Ariane Rädler	(United States) Mikaela Shiffrin	
1720	23	22 January 2022	(Italy) Cortina d'Ampezzo (Olimpia delle Tofane 65%)	DH _{429}	(Italy) Sofia Goggia	(Austria) Ramona Siebenhofer	(Czech Republic) Ester Ledecká	(United States) Mikaela Shiffrin	
1721	24	23 January 2022	(Italy) Cortina d'Ampezzo (Olimpia delle Tofane 65%)	SG _{250}	(Italy) Elena Curtoni	(Austria) Tamara Tippler	(Switzerland) Michelle Gisin	(United States) Mikaela Shiffrin	
1722	25	25 January 2022	(Italy) Kronplatz (Erta 61%)	GS _{432}	(Sweden) Sara Hector	(Slovakia) Petra Vlhová	(France) Tessa Worley	(United States) Mikaela Shiffrin	
1723	26	29 January 2022	(Germany) Garmisch-Partenkirchen (Kandahar 1 85%)	DH _{430}	(Switzerland) Corinne Suter	(Switzerland) Jasmine Flury	(Austria) Cornelia Hütter	(United States) Mikaela Shiffrin	
1724	27	30 January 2022	(Germany) Garmisch-Partenkirchen (Kandahar 1 85%)	SG _{251}	(Italy) Federica Brignone (Austria) Cornelia Hütter		(Austria) Tamara Tippler	(United States) Mikaela Shiffrin	
2022 Winter Olympics (7 – 20 February • Beijing, China)
1725	28	26 February 2022	(Switzerland) Crans-Montana (Mont Lachaux)	DH _{431}	(Czech Republic) Ester Ledecká	(Norway) Ragnhild Mowinckel	(Austria) Cornelia Hütter	(United States) Mikaela Shiffrin	
1726	29	27 February 2022	(Switzerland) Crans-Montana (Mont Lachaux)	DH _{432}	(Switzerland) Priska Nufer	(Czech Republic) Ester Ledecká	(Italy) Sofia Goggia	(Slovakia) Petra Vlhová (United States) Mikaela Shiffrin	
1727	30	5 March 2022	(Switzerland) Lenzerheide (Silvano Beltrametti piste 65%)	SG _{252}	(France) Romane Miradoli	(United States) Mikaela Shiffrin	(Switzerland) Lara Gut-Behrami	(United States) Mikaela Shiffrin	
1728	31	6 March 2022	(Switzerland) Lenzerheide (Silvano Beltrametti piste 65%)	GS _{433}	(France) Tessa Worley	(Italy) Federica Brignone	(Sweden) Sara Hector	(United States) Mikaela Shiffrin	
1729	32	11 March 2022	(Sweden) Åre (Olympia)	GS _{434}	(Slovakia) Petra Vlhová	(Italy) Marta Bassino	(United States) Mikaela Shiffrin	(United States) Mikaela Shiffrin	
1730	33	12 March 2022	(Sweden) Åre (Olympia)	SL _{486}	(Austria) Katharina Liensberger	(Norway) Mina Fürst Holtmann	(Switzerland) Michelle Gisin	(United States) Mikaela Shiffrin	
World Cup Season Final
1731	34	16 March 2022	(France) Courchevel (L'Éclipse)	DH _{433}	(United States) Mikaela Shiffrin	(Austria) Christine Scheyer (Switzerland) Joana Hählen		(United States) Mikaela Shiffrin	
1732	35	17 March 2022	(France) Courchevel (L'Éclipse)	SG _{253}	(Norway) Ragnhild Mowinckel	(United States) Mikaela Shiffrin	(Switzerland) Michelle Gisin	(United States) Mikaela Shiffrin	
1733	36	19 March 2022	(France) Méribel (Roc de Fer)	SL _{487}	(Slovenia) Andreja Slokar	(Germany) Lena Dürr	(Slovakia) Petra Vlhová	(United States) Mikaela Shiffrin	
1734	37	20 March 2022	(France) Méribel (Roc de Fer)	GS _{435}	(Italy) Federica Brignone	(Italy) Marta Bassino	(Slovakia) Petra Vlhová	(United States) Mikaela Shiffrin	

=== Rankings ===
==== Overall ====
Rank	after all 37 races	Points
	(United States) Mikaela Shiffrin	1493
2	(Slovakia) Petra Vlhová	1309
3	(Italy) Federica Brignone	1055
4	(Norway) Ragnhild Mowinckel	880
5	(Switzerland) Michelle Gisin	874

==== Downhill ====
Rank	after all 9 races	Points
	(Italy) Sofia Goggia	504
2	(Switzerland) Corinne Suter	407
3	(Czech Republic) Ester Ledecká	339
4	(Austria) Ramona Siebenhofer	331
5	(Austria) Mirjam Puchner	296

==== Super-G ====
Rank	after all 9 races	Points
	(Italy) Federica Brignone	506
2	(Italy) Elena Curtoni	390
3	(United States) Mikaela Shiffrin	380
4	(Norway) Ragnhild Mowinckel	353
5	(Italy) Sofia Goggia	332

==== Giant slalom ====
Rank	after all 9 races	Points
	(France) Tessa Worley	567
2	(Sweden) Sara Hector	540
3	(United States) Mikaela Shiffrin	507
4	(Slovakia) Petra Vlhová	491
5	(Italy) Marta Bassino	356

==== Slalom ====
Rank	after all 9 races	Points
	(Slovakia) Petra Vlhová	770
2	(United States) Mikaela Shiffrin	501
3	(Germany) Lena Dürr	437
4	(Austria) Katharina Liensberger	392
5	(Switzerland) Wendy Holdener	357

==== Parallel (PG) ====
Rank	after all 1 race	Points
1	(Slovenia) Andreja Slokar	100
2	(Norway) Thea Louise Stjernesund	80
3	(Norway) Kristin Lysdahl	60
4	(Italy) Marta Bassino	50
5	(Sweden) Sara Hector	45

== Alpine team event ==
World Cup history in real time

Total	SL + SG	PG	Winners
16	3	13	6

after PG in Méribel (18 March 2022)

=== Calendar ===
Event key: PG – Parallel giant slalom
All	No.	Date	Venue (slope %)	Type	Winner	Second	Third	R.
World Cup Season Final
16	1	18 March 2022	(France) Méribel (Roc de Fer)	PG _{013}	Switzerland Delphine Darbellay; Andrea Ellenberger; Fadri Janutin; Livio Simonet	Austria Stefan Brennsteiner; Patrick Feurstein; Fabio Gstrein*; Ricarda Haaser; Katharina Huber*; Katharina Truppe	Germany Lena Dürr; Fabian Gratz; Antonia Kermer; Julian Rauchfuß	

* reserve skiers

== Nations Cup ==
Overall

Rank	after all 75 races	Points
1	Austria	10667
2	Switzerland	10410
3	Italy	6511
4	Norway	6074
5	France	4194

Men

Rank	after all 38 races	Points
1	Switzerland	5705
2	Austria	5682
3	Norway	4228
4	Italy	2600
5	France	2251

Women

Rank	after all 38 races	Points
1	Austria	4985
2	Switzerland	4705
3	Italy	3911
4	United States	2268
5	France	1943

== Prize money ==
Top-5 men

Rank	after all 37 races	CHF
1	(Switzerland) Marco Odermatt	565 445
2	(Norway) Aleksander Aamodt Kilde	468 900
3	(Norway) Henrik Kristoffersen	308 546
4	(Switzerland) Beat Feuz	228 600
5	(Austria) Vincent Kriechmayr	223 700

Top-5 women

Rank	after all 37 races	CHF
1	(Slovakia) Petra Vlhová	408 332
2	(United States) Mikaela Shiffrin	406 745
3	(Italy) Sofia Goggia	309 250
4	(Italy) Federica Brignone	247 275
5	(Sweden) Sara Hector	194 073

== Podium table by nation ==
Table showing the World Cup podium places (gold–1st place, silver–2nd place, bronze–3rd place) by the countries represented by the athletes.

Rank	Nation	Gold	Silver	Bronze	Total
1	Norway	17	11	3	31
2	Switzerland	14	17	20	51
3	Italy	13	6	6	25
4	Austria	8	16	20	44
5	United States	6	9	4	19
6	Slovakia	6	4	3	13
7	France	4	5	3	12
8	Sweden	3	2	4	9
9	Slovenia	2	0	1	3
10	Germany	1	2	7	10
11	Canada	1	1	1	3
11	Czech Republic	1	1	1	3
13	Great Britain	1	1	0	2
14	Croatia	0	0	1	1
Totals (14 entries)		77	75	74	226

== Achievements ==
First World Cup career victory

Men

- (Austria) Christian Hirschbühl (31), in his 8th season – Parallel giant slalom in Lech/Zürs
- (United States) Bryce Bennett (29), in his 9th season – Downhill in Val Gardena/Gröden
- (Austria) Johannes Strolz (29), in his 8th season – Slalom in Adelboden
- (United Kingdom) Dave Ryding (35), in his 12th season – Slalom in Kitzbühel
- (Canada) Cameron Alexander (24), in his 3rd season – Downhill in Kvitfjell
- (Norway) Atle Lie McGrath (21), in his 4th season – Slalom in Flachau

Women

- (Slovenia) Andreja Slokar (24), in her 5th season – Parallel giant slalom in Lech/Zürs
- (Switzerland) Priska Nufer (30), in her 10th season – Downhill in Crans Montana
- (France) Romane Miradoli (27), in her 10th season – Super-G in Lenzerheide

First World Cup podium

Men

- (Austria) Christian Hirschbühl (31), in his 8th season – Parallel giant slalom in Lech/Zürs – 1st place
- (United States) Bryce Bennett (29), in his 9th season – Downhill in Val Gardena/Gröden – 1st place
- (Austria) Johannes Strolz (29), in his 8th season – Slalom in Adelboden – 1st place
- (Canada) Cameron Alexander (24), in his 3rd season – Downhill in Kvitfjell – 1st place
- (Austria) Dominik Raschner (27), in his 7th season – Parallel giant slalom in Lech/Zürs – 2nd place
- (Sweden) Kristoffer Jakobsen (27), in his 6th season – Slalom in Val d'Isère – 2nd place
- (Italy) Luca De Aliprandini (31), in his 11th season – Giant slalom in Alta Badia – 2nd place
- (Austria) Raphael Haaser (24), in his 3rd season – Super-G in Bormio – 2nd place
- (Canada) James Crawford (24), in his 6th season – Super-G in Kvitfjell – 2nd place
- (Canada) Broderick Thompson (27), in his 6th season – Super-G in Beaver Creek – 3rd place
- (France) Blaise Giezendanner (30), in his 9th season – Downhill in Kitzbühel – 3rd place
- (Austria) Daniel Hemetsberger (30), in his 5th season – Downhill in Kitzbühel – 3rd place

Women

- (Slovenia) Andreja Slokar (24), in her 5th season – Parallel giant slalom in Lech/Zürs – 1st place
- (Switzerland) Priska Nufer (30), in her 10th season – Downhill in Crans Montana – 1st place
- (France) Romane Miradoli (27), in her 10th season – Super-G in Lenzerheide – 1st place
- (Norway) Thea Louise Stjernesund (24), in her 4th season – Parallel giant slalom in Lech/Zürs – 2nd place
- (Norway) Kristin Lysdahl (25), in her 6th season – Parallel giant slalom in Lech/Zürs – 3rd place
- (Austria) Ariane Rädler (26), in her 4th season – Super-G in Zauchensee – 3rd place

Number of wins this season (in brackets are all-time wins)

Men

- (Norway) Aleksander Aamodt Kilde – 7 (13)
- (Switzerland) Marco Odermatt – 7 (11)
- (Norway) Henrik Kristoffersen – 5 (28)
- (Austria) Vincent Kriechmayr – 3 (12)
- (Italy) Dominik Paris – 2 (21)
- (Norway) Atle Lie McGrath – 2 (2)
- (Switzerland) Beat Feuz – 1 (16)
- (Austria) Matthias Mayer – 1 (11)
- (France) Clément Noël – 1 (9)
- (Germany) Linus Straßer – 1 (3)
- (Norway) Lucas Braathen – 1 (2)
- (Norway) Sebastian Foss-Solevåg – 1 (2)
- (Switzerland) Niels Hintermann – 1 (2)
- (Canada) Cameron Alexander – 1 (1)
- (United States) Bryce Bennett – 1 (1)
- (Austria) Christian Hirschbühl – 1 (1)
- (United Kingdom) Dave Ryding – 1 (1)
- (Austria) Johannes Strolz – 1 (1)

Women

- (Slovakia) Petra Vlhová – 6 (26)
- (Italy) Sofia Goggia – 6 (17)
- (United States) Mikaela Shiffrin – 5 (74)
- (Italy) Federica Brignone – 4 (20)
- (Sweden) Sara Hector – 3 (4)
- (Switzerland) Lara Gut-Behrami – 2 (34)
- (France) Tessa Worley – 2 (16)
- (Slovenia) Andreja Slokar – 2 (2)
- (Switzerland) Corinne Suter – 1 (4)
- (Austria) Cornelia Hütter – 1 (3)
- (Czech Republic) Ester Ledecká – 1 (3)
- (Austria) Katharina Liensberger – 1 (3)
- (Italy) Elena Curtoni – 1 (2)
- (Norway) Ragnhild Mowinckel – 1 (2)
- (France) Romane Miradoli – 1 (1)
- (Switzerland) Priska Nufer – 1 (1)

== Retirements ==
The following athletes announced their retirements during or after the season:

Men

- (Switzerland) Carlo Janka
- (Norway) Kjetil Jansrud
- (Sweden) Alexander Köll
- (Croatia) Elias Kolega
- (United States) Alex Leever
- (Switzerland) Nils Mani
- (Italy) Manfred Mölgg
- (Italy) Roberto Nani
- (France) Nicolas Raffort
- (Switzerland) Marco Reymond
- (Sweden) Olle Sundin

Women

- (Switzerland) Carole Bissig
- (Switzerland) Charlotte Chable
- (Sweden) Ida Dannewitz
- (Germany) Patrizia Dorsch
- (Slovenia) Maruša Ferk Saioni
- (Sweden) Magdalena Fjällström
- (Switzerland) Luana Flütsch
- (Italy) Verena Gasslitter
- (France) Tiffany Gauthier
- (Croatia) Andrea Komšić
- (Italy) Francesca Marsaglia
- (Italy) Roberta Midali
- (Canada) Erin Mielzynski
- (Spain) Nuria Pau
- (Czech Republic) Kateřina Pauláthová
- (Germany) Meike Pfister
- (Austria) Stephanie Resch
- (Norway) Kristina Riis-Johannessen
- (Italy) Federica Sosio

== See also ==
- 2021–22 FIS Alpine Ski Continental Cup
- 2021–22 FIS Alpine Ski Europa Cup
- 2021–22 FIS Alpine Ski Nor-Am Cup
- 2021–22 FIS Alpine Ski Far East Cup
- 2021–22 FIS Alpine Ski South American Cup
- 2021–22 FIS Alpine Ski Australia-New Zealand Cup
