= 2026 Alpine Skiing World Cup – Men's downhill =

Alpine ski discipline year standings

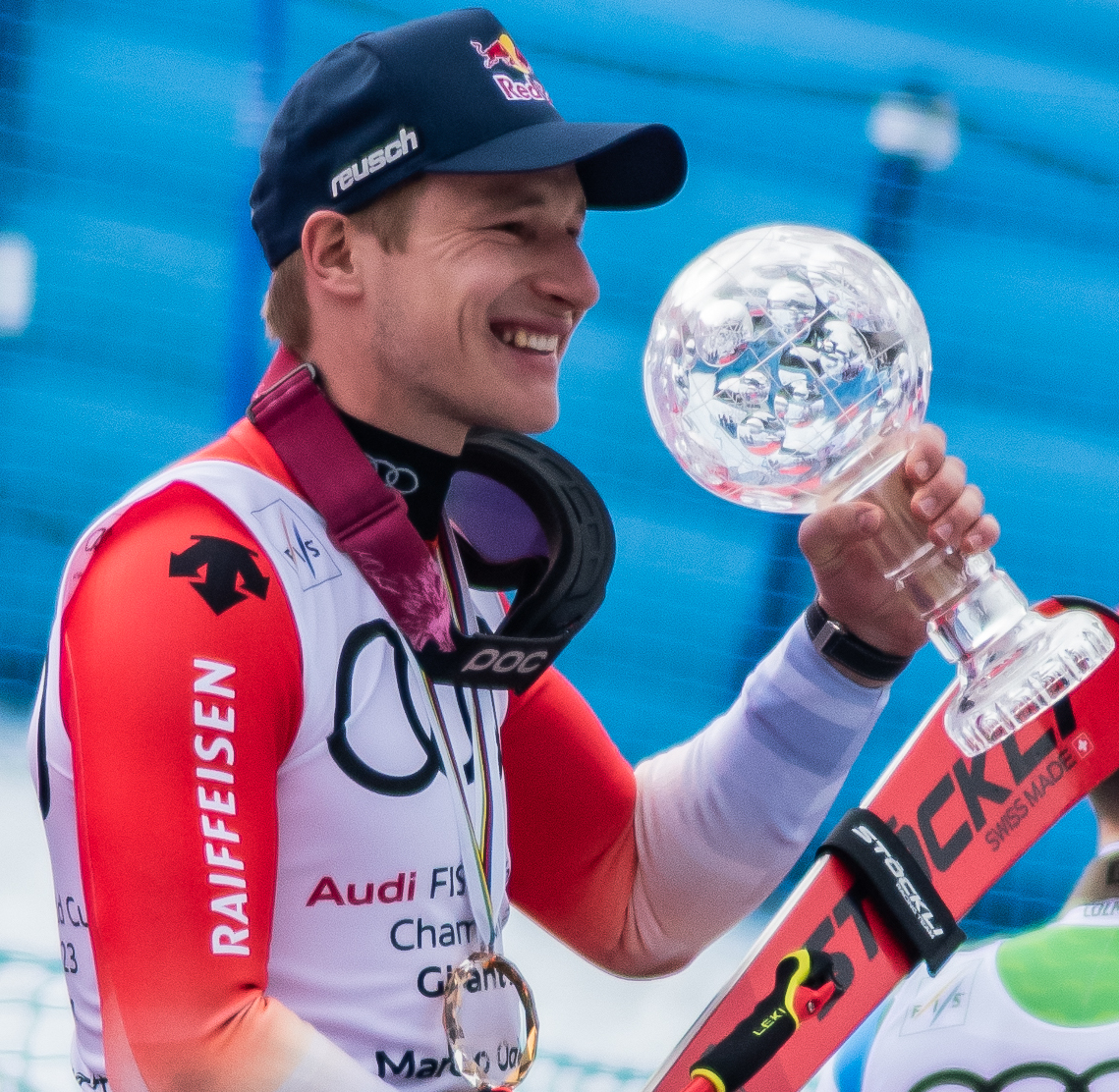
2026 Men's Downhill World Cup: Marco Odermatt of Switzerland, season champion for the third time; 2026 Men's World Cup; Overall • Downhill • Super-G; Giant slalom • Slalom
Previous: 2025	Next: 2027

The men's downhill in the 2026 FIS Alpine Skiing World Cup consisted of nine events, including the final. The season began with two downhills at Beaver Creek, Colorado (U.S.) on 4 and 5 December 2025, then proceeded to Europe for the remainder of the races, which was consistent with the initial schedule released on 12 June 2025. For the third straight season, Switzerland's Marco Odermatt won the discipline title.

The season was interrupted for the quadrennial 2026 Winter Olympics in three regions in Italy -- Milan, the Stelvio Pass, and Cortina d'Ampezzo -- during 6–22 February 2026. All of the Alpine skiing events for men took place on the classic Stelvio course at Bormio. The championship in men's downhill was held on Saturday, 7 February and was won by Switzerland's Franjo von Allmen, who placed second in the discipline for the season.

== Season summary ==
The start of the downhill season at Beaver Creek (U.S.) ran into scheduling problems, as high winds and a large impending weekend snowstorm led to (1) the cancellation of one of the two downhills scheduled there and (2) the date of the second one being moved up to the planned date of the first one (4 December); the cancelled race was added as a second downhill at Val Gardena (Italy) two weeks later. The contested downhill at Beaver Creek was then won by defending discipline champion Marco Odermatt of Switzerland, who defeated American Ryan Cochran-Siegle by 0.3 seconds. In the first of the two races now at Val Gardena, overcast conditions led to the downhill being shortened and still needing almost four hours to complete due to the delays caused by fog, but Odermatt won again for his 50th overall World Cup victory, edging his compatriot Franjo von Allmen and tying Alberto Tomba (Italy) for third all-time among World Cup men, with only Ingmar Stenmark (Sweden) (86 wins), Marcel Hirscher (Austria/Netherlands) (67), and Hermann Maier (Austria) (54) still ahead of him. Two days later, the results were flipped in the second downhill, with von Allmen edging Odermatt in a full-length downhill and closing to within 50 points of the discipline lead.

The downhill season resumed with back-to-back weeks in mid-January at Wengen, Switzerland, and Kitzbühel, Austria. The downhill at Wengen was run on a shortened course due to high winds, but Odermatt dominated to win his fourth straight downhill at Wengen, with Austria's Vincent Kriechmayr (0.79 sec) his closest challenger, thereby increasing Odermatt's lead in the discipline over von Allmen (who finished fourth) to exactly 100 points. But rising young Italian star Giovanni Franzoni, who had posted his first World Cup win the day before in a super-G at Wengen before finishing third in the downhill, got revenge the next week in the legendary downhill at Kitzbühel, edging Odermatt by 0.07 to win, and then dedicating the victory to his late friend and teammate – and roommate at Kitzbühel last year – Matteo Franzoso, who was killed in a training crash in Chile in September 2025. Finally, in the last race before the Olympics, von Allmen dominated the downhill at Crans Montana, Switzerland, defeating runner-up Dominik Paris of Italy by about two-thirds of a second for his second straight victory on the course, which kept von Allmen in second place in the discipline, 115 points behind Odermatt, with three races remaining after the Olympics.

At the Olympic downhill at Bormio, the Swiss got into position for an unprecedented podium sweep, with von Allmen in first by 0.7 second, followed by Odermatt and Alexis Monney. But the later-running Italians Franzoni and Dominik Paris (known as the "King of Bormio" for his seven victories there) both fed off the support from the home crowd and squeezed in between von Allmen and Odermatt, knocking Odermatt off the podium but retaining von Allmen as the fifth Swiss winner of the men's downhill (after Bernhard Russi, Pirmin Zurbriggen, Didier Defago, and Beat Feuz). In the first post-Olympic race at Garmisch-Partenkirchen (Germany), Odermatt led an actual Swiss sweep of the podium, edging Monney by .04 seconds for his fourth downhill victory of the season and leaving him 175 points up on von Allmen with just two races remaining in the discipline. In the last downhill before the finals, at Courchevel (France), von Allmen failed to finish, which handed Odermatt, who was third, both the discipline title and the overall title; in the race itself, Kriechmayr edged Franzoni to become the first Austrian to win a downhill since he last did it three years prior (15 March 2023).

== Finals ==
The World Cup finals in the discipline took place on Saturday, 21 March 2026 on the Olympiabakken course at Kvitfjell, near Lillehammer, Norway. Only the top 25 skiers in the World Cup downhill discipline and the winner of the 2026 FIS Junior World Championships in the discipline (which was cancelled due to bad weather), plus any skiers who have scored at least 500 points in the World Cup overall classification for the season, were eligible to compete in the final, and only the top 15 earned World Cup points. All 23 of the healthy qualifiers competed (missing only Nils Alphand of France and Elian Lehto of Finland), as well as 500-point qualifier Marco Schwarz of Austria, setting the starting field at 24. In the race, Paris managed to reverse his results vis-à-vis von Allmen from Crans Montana in February, this time edging von Allmen by .19 seconds for his first win of the season, which enabled Paris to place third in the discipline for the season, behind only Odermatt and von Allmen.

== Standings ==
	Venue	4 Dec 2025; Beaver Creek	4 Dec 2025; Beaver Creek	18 Dec 2025; Val Gardena/Gröden R#	20 Dec 2025; Val Gardena/Gröden	17 Jan 2026; Wengen	24 Jan 2026; Kitzbühel	1 Feb 2026; Crans Montana	7 Feb 2026; Bormio	28 Feb 2026; Garmisch	13 Mar 2026; Courchevel	21 Mar 2026; Kvitfjell	
#	Skier	(United States)	(United States)	(Italy)	(Italy)	(Switzerland)	(Austria)	(Switzerland)	(Italy)	(Germany)	(France)	(Norway)	Total
	(Switzerland) Marco Odermatt	x	100	100	80	100	80	50	④	100	60	36	706
2	(Switzerland) Franjo von Allmen	x	50	80	100	50	15	100	①	40	DNF	80	515
3	(Italy) Dominik Paris	x	40	60	40	40	36	80	③	29	16	100	441
4	(Austria) Vincent Kriechmayr	x	45	7	20	80	20	DNS	⑥	50	100	60	382
5	(Italy) Giovanni Franzoni	x	2	32	22	60	100	8	②	50	80	24	378
6	(Italy) Florian Schieder	x	18	40	60	22	50	29	⑰	32	DNF	26	277
7	(Switzerland) Alexis Monney	x	29	29	DNF	45	0	26	⑤	80	DNF	50	259
8	(France) Nils Allègre	x	22	50	13	29	45	7	⑧	20	24	18	228
9	(United States) Ryan Cochran-Siegle	x	80	0	DNF	16	0	60	⑱	36	22	0	214
10	(Switzerland) Stefan Rogentin	x	32	1	0	18	0	6	㉓	60	50	40	207
11	(Italy) Mattia Casse	x	8	36	32	3	24	36	⑪	11	13	0	163
12	(Austria) Daniel Hemetsberger	x	6	15	12	32	DNF	18	⑦	9	40	29	161
13	(France) Maxence Muzaton	x	20	0	8	24	60	22	DNF	8	14	0	156
14	(Slovenia) Miha Hrobat	x	15	2	0	7	29	5	⑫	12	36	45	151
15	(Canada) Cameron Alexander	x	26	DNS	DNS	36	18	24	⑭	18	DNF	22	144
16	(Norway) Adrian Smiseth Sejersted	x	60	4	0	0	10	DNS	DNF	16	29	20	139
17	(Italy) Benjamin Alliod	x	0	18	11	8	0	45	DNS	7	18	32	139
18	(Switzerland) Niels Hintermann	x	11	11	36	10	40	15	DNS	DNS	DNS	0	123
19	(Switzerland) Justin Murisier	x	10	9	15	14	0	15	DNS	26	26	0	115
20	(Switzerland) Alessio Miggiano	x	DNS	13	45	0	5	32	DNS	0	15	0	110
21	(Austria) Raphael Haaser	x	12	0	DNS	12	6	DNS	⑮	5	45	16	96
22	(France) Nils Alphand	x	0	45	50	0	DNF	DNF	㉒	DNS			95
23	(Italy) Christof Innerhofer	x	0	24	0	26	3	10	DNS	10	11	0	84
24	(Finland) Elian Lehto	x	14	26	26	2	15	0	⑳	DNS			83
25	(Slovenia) Martin Čater	x	0	0	DNF	13	0	3	⑯	22	32	0	70
26	(Switzerland) Lars Rösti	x	0	5	0	1	0	40	DNS	13	0	NE	59
27	(Germany) Luis Vogt	x	DNS	10	2	0	32	13	DNS	DNS		NE	57
28	(Austria) Stefan Babinsky	x	13	18	0	0	0	16	㉖	2	8	NE	57
29	(Sweden) Felix Monsén	x	0	0	1	0	26	4	DNS	14	9	NE	54
30	(Switzerland) Marco Kohler	x	7	24	0	20	DNF	DNS				NE	51
31	(France) Blaise Giezendanner	x	0	0	18	0	10	0	DNS	15	3	NE	46
32	(United States) Kyle Negomir	x	0	24	15	0	0	0	⑩	0	6	NE	45
33	(United States) Erik Arvidsson	x	0	0	0	0	12	0	DNS	24	8	NE	44
34	(Germany) Simon Jocher	x	0	0	18	9	1	10	㉑	0	0	NE	38
35	(Austria) Stefan Eichberger	x	36	DNS								NE	36
36	(France) Adrien Théaux	x	0	6	29	0	DNS			0	DNS	NE	35
37	(United States) Bryce Bennett	x	3	0	5	11	0	13	⑬	0	0	NE	32
38	(Canada) James Crawford	x	0	8	4	5	8	0	⑨	3	4	NE	32
39	(Austria) Andreas Ploier	x	0	DNS	24	6	0	1	DNS	0	DNS	NE	31
40	(United States) Wiley Maple	x	0	0	0	0	12	2	DNS	6	10	NE	30
41	(France) Alban Elezi Cannaferina	x	0	DNS		4	22	DNS	㉗	DNS	0	NE	26
42	(Norway) Aleksander Aamodt Kilde	x	24	0	DNS	DNS		0	DNS			NE	24
43	(Switzerland) Livio Hiltbrand	x	0	3	0	0	0	20	DNS	0	0	NE	23
44	(Austria) Stefan Rieser	x	DNS	14	9	0	DNF	0	DNS	DNS	DNS	NE	23
45	(Chile) Henrik Von Appen	x	0	0	6	15	0	DNF	DNS			NE	21
46	(Germany) Romed Baumann	x	9	12	0	0	0	0	DNS	0	DNS	NE	21
47	(Switzerland) Arnaud Boisset	x	DNS							0	20	NE	20
48	(Canada) Brodie Seger	x	16	0	0	0	2	0	㉘	0	2	NE	20
49	(France) Charles Gamel Seigneur	x	DNS	0	0	DNS	16	0	DNS	DNS	DNF	NE	16
50	(France) Matthieu Bailet	x	0	DNS	3	DNF	13	0	DNS	0	0	NE	16
51	(Italy) Guglielmo Bosca	x	0	DNS	DNS	DNF	0	11	DNS	DNF	5	NE	16
52	(France) Sam Alphand	x	DNS		10	DSQ	DNS	0	DNS	5	DNF	NE	15
53	(Austria) Vincent Wieser	x	DNS	0	0	DNS	0	0	DNS	0	12	NE	12
54	(Austria) Manuel Traninger	x	0	0	DNS	0	7	0	DNS	DNS	0	NE	7
55	(United States) Sam Morse	x	0	0	7	0	0	0	⑲	0	0	NE	7
56	(Czech Republic) Jan Zabystřan	x	5	0	0	0	0	0	㉔	DNS	0	NE	5
57	(Canada) Jeffrey Read	x	0	0	0	0	4	0	㉕	0	1	NE	5
58	(Slovenia) Nejc Naraločnik	x	4	0	DNF	DNS						NE	4
59	(Austria) Marco Schwarz	x	DNS							2	0	0	2
60	(Norway) Fredrik Møller	x	1	DNF	DNS			0	DNS	DNF	0	NE	1
	References												

=== Legend ===
- Winner (100 points)
- 2nd place (80 points)
- 3rd place (60 points)
- DNF = Did not finish
- DSQ = Disqualified
- Did not start (DNS)
- Not eligible for finals (NE)
- Race canceled (x)
- FIS non-World Cup race (Olympics)
- R# = Rescheduled (make-up) race
- Updated at 21 March 2026, after all events.

== See also ==
- 2026 Alpine Skiing World Cup – Men's summary rankings
- 2026 Alpine Skiing World Cup – Men's overall
- 2026 Alpine Skiing World Cup – Men's super-G
- 2026 Alpine Skiing World Cup – Men's giant slalom
- 2026 Alpine Skiing World Cup – Men's slalom
- World Cup scoring system
