= Nils Alphand =

French alpine skier (born 1999)

Personal information
- Born: 16 June 1996 (age 30) Briançon, France
- Family: Luc Alphand (father); Estelle Alphand (sister)

Skiing career
- Country: France
- Sport: Alpine skiing
- Club: Club de Ski de Serre Chevalier
- Disciplines: Downhill, Super-G
- World Cup debut: 16 March 2017 (age 20)

Olympics
- Teams: 1 − (2026)
- Medals: 0

World Championships
- Teams: 1 − (2025)
- Medals: 0

World Cup
- Seasons: 6 – (2021-2026)
- Podiums: 0
- Overall titles: 0 – (62nd in 2026)
- Discipline titles: 0 – (22nd in DH, 2026)
Medal record
Men's alpine skiing
Representing France
Junior World Championships
| Gold medal – first place | 2017 Åre | Super-G |

Nils Alphand (born 16 June 1999) is a French World Cup alpine ski racer. He represented France at the 2026 Olympics despite a wrist injury. He is the son of former World Cup champion Luc Alphand and the younger brother of Swedish world championship medalist Estelle Alphand.

== World Cup results ==
=== Season standings ===
Season
| Season | Age | Overall | Slalom | Giant slalom | Super-G | Downhill |
| 2024 | 27 | 76 | — | — | 44 | 29 |
| 2025 | 28 | 101 | — | — | 54 | 35 |
| 2026 | 29 | 62 | — | — | 40 | 22 |

=== Top-ten finishes ===
- 0 podiums; 3 top tens (3 DH)

Season
| Season | Date | Location | Discipline | Place |
| 2024 | 28 December 2023 | Bormio, Italy | Downhill | 9th |
| 2026 | 18 December 2025 | Val Gardena, Italy | Downhill | 5th |
| 2026 | 19 December 2025 | Val Gardena, Italy | Downhill | 4th |

== World Championship results ==
Season
| Season | Age | Slalom | Giant slalom | Super-G | Downhill | Team combined |
| 2025 | 28 | — | — | DNF | 24 | 14 |

== Olympic results ==
Season
| Season | Age | Slalom | Giant slalom | Super-G | Downhill | Team combined |
| 2026 | 29 | — | — | DNF | 22 | 16 |
