= Fredrik Møller (alpine skier) =

Norwegian alpine skier (born 2000)

Personal information
- Born: 27 October 2000 (age 25) Norway

Skiing career
- Country: Norway
- Sport: Alpine skiing
- Club: Oppdal Alpin
- Disciplines: Super-G, Downhill, Giant slalom
- World Cup debut: 9 December 2023 (age 23)

Olympics
- Teams: 1 – (2026)
- Medals: 0

World Championships
- Teams: 1 – (2025)
- Medals: 0

World Cup
- Seasons: 3 – (2024–2026)
- Wins: 1 – (1 SG)
- Podiums: 2 – (2 SG)
- Overall titles: 0 – (26th in 2025)
- Discipline titles: 0 – (5th in SG, 2025)

Fredrik Møller (born 27 October 2000) is a Norwegian World Cup alpine ski racer and focuses on the speed events of downhill and super-G.

Møller made his World Cup debut in December 2023 at Val d'Isère, France, and collected his first World Cup points with a 24th-place finish in a giant slalom. His first victory came in a super-G at Bormio in December 2024, after placing fourth in the season's previous two super-G events.

At his first World Championships in 2025, Møller was fifth in the super-G and fifteenth in the downhill at Saalbach-Hinterglemm, Austria.

Møller represents the sports club Oppdal IL, based in Oppdal Municipality.

== World Cup results ==
=== Season standings ===
Season
Season	Age	Overall	Slalom	Giant slalom	Super-G	Downhill
2024	23	109	—	42	49	55
2025	24	26	—	—	5	37
2026	25	46	—	—	11	60

=== Top-ten results ===
- 1 win (1 SG)
- 2 podiums (2 SG), 7 top tens ( SG)

Season
Season	Date	Location	Discipline	Place
2025	7 December 2024	Beaver Creek, United States	Super-G	4th
2025	20 December 2024	Val Gardena/Gröden, Italy	Super-G	4th
2025	29 December 2024	Bormio, Italy	Super-G	1st
2025	23 March 2025	Sun Valley, United States	Super-G	7th
2026	27 November 2025	Copper Mountain, United States	Super-G	5th
2026	5 December 2025	Beaver Creek, United States	Super-G	2nd
2026	22 March 2026	Kvitfjell, Norway	Super-G	7th

== World Championship results ==
Year
Year	Age	Slalom	Giant slalom	Super-G	Downhill	Team combined	Team event
2025	24	—	—	5	15	DNF2	—

== Olympic results ==
Year
Year	Age	Slalom	Giant slalom	Super-G	Downhill	Team combined
2026	25	—	—	8	—	—
