= Kyle Negomir =

American alpine skier (born 1998)

Personal information
- Born: October 3, 1998 (age 27) Littleton, Colorado, U.S.

Skiing career
- Country: United States
- Sport: Alpine skiing
- Disciplines: Super-G, Downhill
- World Cup debut: December 2, 2018 (age 20)

Olympics
- Teams: 1 – (2026)
- Medals: 0

World Championships
- Teams: 1 – (2023)
- Medals: 0

World Cup
- Seasons: 6 – (2019–2020, 2023–2026)
- Podiums: 0
- Overall titles: 0 – (72nd in 2026)
- Discipline titles: 0 – (26th in SG, 2026)

Kyle Negomir (born October 3, 1998) is an American World Cup alpine ski racer who competes in speed and technical events. He has represented the United States in international competition, including the 2026 Winter Olympics and 2023 World Championships.

== Early life and background ==
Negomir was born in Littleton, Colorado, and grew up in a ski-oriented environment that helped shape his competitive career. He is nicknamed "Nego." From a young age, he developed skills in alpine racing and progressed through the American development pipeline.

Negomir later joined the U.S. Ski & Snowboard system, where he continued to advance in multiple disciplines.

== Career ==
=== Junior and development years ===
Negomir built his early résumé through FIS and Nor-Am Cup competitions, steadily improving his international ranking. His versatility allowed him to compete in downhill, super-G, and giant slalom events.

=== International competition ===
He earned experience on the Nor-Am circuit and other international races, posting several top finishes. Among his notable results is a Nor-Am Cup podium performance in super-G at Lake Louise, Canada.

Negomir made is World Cup debut in December 2018, and has posted two top-fifteen results on that circuit. He competed in the super-G at the 2023 World Championships and finished seventeenth.

=== Olympics ===
At the Milano Cortina 2026 Olympics, Negomir was the top finisher of four U.S. skiers in the downhill, where he placed 10th overall. In the team combined he finished 19th with teammate River Radamus, in the super-G he placed 26th, and in the giant slalom he recorded a DNF.

== World Cup results ==
=== Season standings ===
Season
Season	Age	Overall	Slalom	Giant slalom	Super-G	Downhill
2023	24	125	—	—	47	—
2024	25	94	—	—	30	49
2025	26	93	—	—	31	55
2026	27	72	—	—	26	32

=== Top-fifteen finishes ===
- 0 podiums, 2 top fifteens (1 DH, 1 SG)

Season
Season	Date	Location	Discipline	Place
2024	18 February 2024	Kvitfjell, Norway	Super-G	12th
2026	18 December 2025	Val Gardena, Italy	Downhill	11th

== World Championship results ==
Year
Year	Age	Slalom	Giant slalom	Super-G	Downhill	Combined	Team event
2023	24	—	—	17	—	—	—

== Olympic results ==
Year
Year	Age	Slalom	Giant slalom	Super-G	Downhill	Team combined
2026	27	—	DNF1	26	10	19
