= 2025 Alpine Skiing World Cup – Men's downhill =

Alpine ski discipline year standings

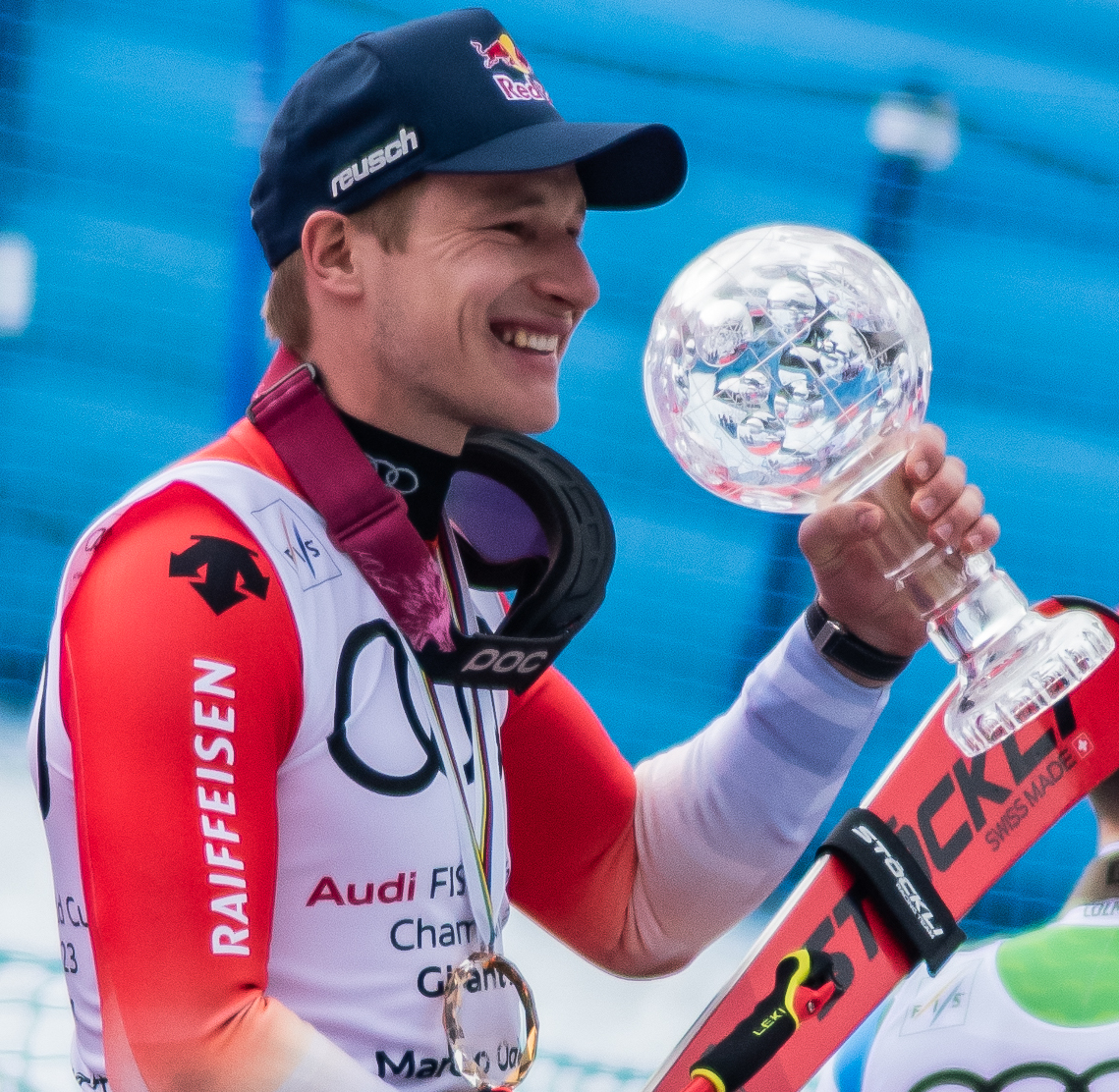
2025 Men's Downhill World Cup: Marco Odermatt of Switzerland, discipline champion for the second straight year; 2025 Men's World Cup; Overall • Downhill • Super-G; Giant slalom • Slalom
Previous: 2024	Next: 2026

The men's downhill in the 2025 FIS Alpine Skiing World Cup consisted of eight events. It had been scheduled for nine, but the finals were cancelled due to fresh snow and high winds. Two-time discipline champion Aleksander Aamodt Kilde of Norway, who failed to repeat last season because he suffered life-threatening injuries on the Lauberhorn downhill course in January 2024, developed a shoulder infection at the surgical site over the summer and needed a second surgery, which caused him to miss the entire season, making defending discipline champion Marco Odermatt of Switzerland an overwhelming favorite to repeat as the season champion. And Odermatt did indeed repeat as champion when the finals were cancelled with him in the discipline lead.

The season was interrupted for the biennial Alpine Skiing World Championships in Saalbach, Austria during 4–16 February 2025. The championship in men's downhill was held on Sunday, 9 February, and was dominated by the Swiss team, with young star Franjo von Allmen winning gold, teammate Alexis Monney taking bronze, and five Swiss skiers finishing in the top 12.

== Season summary ==
Downhill season began in early December 2024 at Beaver Creek (Colorado), USA with Swiss skier Justin Murisier winning his first-ever World Cup race in an upset over his Swiss teammate Marco Odermatt. However, Odermatt bounced back to dominate the next downhill in Val Gardena. In the third downhill, on the Stelvio course in Bormio, Odermatt made a mid race error that pushed him down to fifth, but two of his Swiss teammates (Alexis Monney and 23-year-old Franjo von Allmen) made up for it by taking the top two places, which gave the Swiss the top four places in the discipline standings for the season. Once again, Odermatt bounced back to defeat Von Allmen on home snow in Wengen, but then the Swiss downhill monopoly for the season was finally ended by Canada's James Crawford, with his first World Cup victory, in Kitzbühel, Austria. The final race before the World Championships, scheduled in Garmisch-Partenkirchen, Germany, was cancelled when two straight days of fog caused both pre-race training runs to be cancelled, which meant that the downhill could not take place; the race was rescheduled for the first day at Kvitfjell.

In the World Championships, von Allmen and Monney continued their meteoric rise, with von Allmen defeating home star Vincent Kriechmayr for the gold medal and Monney claiming the bronze, with Odermatt fifth. In the first race after worlds, von Allmen led another Swiss sweep on the home snow in Crans Montana, with Odermatt second and Monney third. However, in the first of the last two races before final, the make-up at Kvitfjell, Italy's Dominik Paris beat three Swiss skiers led by Odermatt to capture his fifth win (four in DH) on the course. But the next day, the Swiss, led once again by Von Allmen, and followed by Odermatt and Rogentin, swept the podium. With the win, Von Allmen cut Odermatt's lead for the discipline title to 83 points, meaning that either of them could still win the crystal globe for the discipline at finals.

== Finals ==
The World Cup finals in the discipline were scheduled to take place on Saturday, 22 March 2025 in Sun Valley, Idaho, United States. Only the top 25 skiers in the World Cup downhill discipline and the winner of the Junior World Championship in that discipline (Felix Rösle of Germany), plus any skiers who have scored at least 500 points in the World Cup overall classification for the season, were eligible to compete in the final, and only the top 15 would earn World Cup points. The only 500+-point skier who chose to enter was Loïc Meillard of Switzerland, and two qualified skiers (Cameron Alexander of Canada and Mattia Casse of Italy) did not enter due to injury, leaving the total field at 25 (including Rösle). However, a combination of fresh snow in the morning and high winds in the early afternoon forced the downhill finals to be cancelled, thus handing the discipline crown to Odermatt and also locking up a Swiss podium sweep (with von Allman second and Monney third).

== Standings ==
	Venue	6 Dec 2024; Beaver Creek	21 Dec 2024; Val Gardena/Gröden	28 Dec 2024; Bormio	18 Jan 2025; Wengen	25 Jan 2025; Kitzbühel	2 Feb 2025; Garmisch	9 Feb 2025; Saalbach WC	22 Feb 2025; Crans Montana	7 Mar 2025; Kvitfjell R#	8 Mar 2025; Kvitfjell	22 Mar 2025; Sun Valley	
#	Skier	(United States)	(Italy)	(Italy)	(Switzerland)	(Austria)	(Germany)	(Austria)	(Switzerland)	(Norway)	(Norway)	(United States)	Total
	(Switzerland) Marco Odermatt	80	100	45	100	40	x	⑤	80	80	80	x	605
2	(Switzerland) Franjo von Allmen	3	80	80	80	29	x	①	100	50	100	x	522
3	(Switzerland) Alexis Monney	20	0	100	DSQ	80	x	③	60	45	22	x	327
4	(Slovenia) Miha Hrobat	60	16	36	60	45	x	DNF	29	24	50	x	320
5	(Canada) James Crawford	50	0	14	29	100	x	㉓	40	5	32	x	270
6	(Italy) Dominik Paris	12	6	0	50	22	x	④	32	100	40	x	262
7	(Switzerland) Justin Murisier	100	2	40	36	24	x	⑧	13	16	26	x	257
8	(Switzerland) Stefan Rogentin	20	26	22	22	0	x	⑫	24	60	60	x	234
9	(Canada) Cameron Alexander	DNF	29	60	45	60	x	DNS					194
10	(France) Nils Allègre	32	50	26	13	4	x	⑩	22	32	14	x	193
11	(Austria) Vincent Kriechmayr	45	0	32	DNF	DNS	x	②	50	22	29	x	178
12	(United States) Ryan Cochran-Siegle	22	60	DNF	24	12	x	⑬	20	26	12	x	176
13	(United States) Bryce Bennett	40	32	0	40	2	x	⑩	14	36	20	x	164
14	(Norway) Adrian Smiseth Sejersted	9	0	2	9	29	x	⑥	12	40	45	x	144
15	(Austria) Stefan Eichberger	11	40	DNF	0	0	x	㉘	36	18	24	x	129
16	(Italy) Florian Schieder	8	0	0	26	16	x	⑯	45	13	20	x	128
17	(Austria) Daniel Hemetsberger	7	22	24	3	50	x	⑦	16	DNS		x	122
	(Italy) Mattia Casse	5	18	50	20	11	x	㉒	18	DNS			122
19	(Austria) Stefan Babinsky	14	0	16	10	32	x	⑨	11	29	9	x	121
20	(France) Maxence Muzaton	15	0	0	18	36	x	⑱	DNF	20	16	x	105
21	(Switzerland) Lars Rösti	13	22	DNF	32	0	x	DNS	15	15	2	x	99
22	(Finland) Elian Lehto	0	0	15	12	5	x	⑭	26	12	0	x	70
23	(Canada) Brodie Seger	26	24	DNS	5	8	x	㉗	0	3	0	x	66
24	(Austria) Otmar Striedinger	2	9	6	14	20	x	DNS	DNF	0	13	x	64
25	(Germany) Romed Baumann	0	36	0	DNF	13	x	⑳	7	6	0	x	62
26	(Switzerland) Marco Kohler	16	0	29	0	0	x	DNS	4	2	8	NE	59
27	(Slovenia) Nejc Naraločnik	0	0	0	0	0	x	㉝	10	12	36	NE	58
28	(France) Adrien Théaux	0	11	DNS	7	14	x	㉜	0	14	11	NE	57
29	(Slovenia) Martin Čater	0	45	5	0	DNF	x	㉞	0	0	0	NE	50
30	(Czech Republic) Jan Zabystřan	24	5	DNF	9	0	x	⑲	0	8	0	NE	46
31	(France) Cyprien Sarrazin	29	14	DNS								NE	43
32	(Italy) Giovanni Franzoni	4	0	12	0	18	x	㉑	0	1	5	NE	40
33	(France) Blaise Giezendanner	36	DNF	3	DNF	DNS						NE	39
34	(Italy) Christof Innerhofer	0	4	13	0	7	x	DNS	5	9	0	NE	38
35	(France) Nils Alphand	2	0	18	0	15	x	㉔	DNS			NE	35
36	(United States) Sam Morse	10	0	0	16	0	x	㊱	1	7	0	NE	34
37	(Germany) Luis Vogt	0	15	9	4	0	x	DNF	0	0	0	NE	28
	(United States) Jared Goldberg	0	0	0	15	6	x	㉔	6	0	1	NE	28
	(Norway) Fredrik Møller	0	0	11	DNF	DNS	x	⑮	10	0	7	NE	28
40	(France) Matthieu Bailet	DNF	0	10	11	3	x	DNS	3	0	0	NE	27
41	(Austria) Stefan Rieser	0	15	1	1	0	x	DNS		0	5	NE	22
42	(Germany) Simon Jocher	0	2	20	DNS		x	㉚	DNS			NE	22
	(Switzerland) Livio Hiltbrand	0	15	0	DNS	0	x	DNS	8	0	0	NE	22
	(Italy) Nicolo Molteni	DNS	0	0	0	0	x	DNS	0	4	18	NE	22
45	(Sweden) Felix Monsén	0	11	0	0	9	x	⑯	0	0	0	NE	20
46	(Italy) Benjamin Jacques Alliod	0	0	DNF	3	0	x	DNS	0	0	15	NE	18
47	(Austria) Felix Hacker	0	2	8	DNS							NE	10
	(Austria) Christopher Neumayer	DNS		0	0	10	x	DNS				NE	10
	(United States) Wiley Maple	0	0	DNF	0	0	x	DNS	0	10	0	NE	10
	(Austria) Andreas Ploier	DNS	0	DNS	0	DNF	x	DNS			10	NE	10
51	(United States) Erik Arvidsson	0	8	DNS								NE	8
	(Chile) Henrik Von Appen	DNS	0	DNS	8	DNF	x	㉛	DNF	0	0	NE	8
	(Austria) Vincent Wieser	0	0	7	DNS	1	x	DNS		0	0	NE	8
54	(Switzerland) Josua Mettler	0	7	DNS								NE	7
55	(Austria) Raphael Haaser	6	DNS						0	0	0	NE	6
	(United States) Kyle Negomir	0	0	0	0	0	x	DNS	0	0	6	NE	6
57	(Austria) Manuel Traninger	0	0	5	0	0	x	DNS		0	0	NE	5
58	(Liechtenstein) Marco Pfiffner	0	4	DNS	0	0	x	㉖	0	0	0	NE	4
59	(Canada) Jeffrey Read	0	0	0	0	0	x	㉙	DNF	0	3	NE	3
	References												

=== Legend ===
- Winner (100 points)
- 2nd place (80 points)
- 3rd place (60 points)
- DNF = Did not finish
- DSQ = Disqualified
- Did not start (DNS)
- Not eligible for finals (NE)
- Race canceled (x)
- FIS non-World Cup race (World Championships)
- R# = Rescheduled (make-up) race
- Updated at 22 March 2025, after all events.

== See also ==
- 2025 Alpine Skiing World Cup – Men's summary rankings
- 2025 Alpine Skiing World Cup – Men's overall
- 2025 Alpine Skiing World Cup – Men's super-G
- 2025 Alpine Skiing World Cup – Men's giant slalom
- 2025 Alpine Skiing World Cup – Men's slalom
- World Cup scoring system
