= Sam Morse =

American alpine skier

Personal information
- Born: May 27, 1996 (age 30) Chesterville, Maine, US
- Home town: Carrabassett Valley, Maine, US

Skiing career
- Country: United States
- Sport: Alpine skiing
- Club: Sugarloaf Ski Club
- Disciplines: Super-G, Downhill
- World Cup debut: March 15, 2017 (age 20)

Olympics
- Teams: 1 – (2026)
- Medals: 0

World Championships
- Teams: 1 – (2025)
- Medals: 0

World Cup
- Seasons: 10 – (2017–2026)
- Podiums: 0
- Overall titles: 0 – (71st in 2024)
- Discipline titles: 0 – (31st in DH and SG, 2025)
Medal record
Men's alpine skiing
Representing the United States
World Junior Championships
Gold medal – first place	2017 Åre	Downhill

Sam Morse (born May 27, 1996) is an American alpine skier. He specializes in the speed disciplines of downhill and super-G and won the gold medal in downhill at the 2017 Junior World Championships.

== Early life and education ==
Morse was born in Chesterville, Maine, and grew up in nearby Carrabassett Valley. He began skiing at Sugarloaf at just 23 months old, developing an early passion for the sport.

He attended Carrabassett Valley Academy, a well-known ski racing school, before continuing his education at Dartmouth College. His childhood nickname "Moose," reflecting both his size and Maine roots, has followed him throughout his career.

He qualified for the Winter Olympics in 2026, finishing 23rd in Super G and 19th in the downhill.

== World Cup results ==
=== Season standings ===
Season
Season	Age	Overall	Slalom	Giant slalom	Super-G	Downhill
2021	24	150	—	—	—	55
2022	25	no World Cup points earned				
2023	26	89	—	—	—	33
2024	27	71	—	—	31	31
2025	28	104	—	—	55	36
2026	29	96	—	—	33	52

Standings through 28 February 2026

=== Top ten finishes ===
- 0 podiums, 2 top tens (2 DH)

Season
Season	Date	Location	Discipline	Place
2023	15 December 2022	Val Gardena, Italy	Downhill	10th
2025	17 February 2025	Kvitfjell, Norway	Downhill	10th

== World Championship results ==
Year
Year	Age	Slalom	Giant slalom	Super-G	Downhill	Team combined	Team event
2025	28	—	—	—	36	—	—

== Olympic results ==
Year
Year	Age	Slalom	Giant slalom	Super-G	Downhill	Team combined
2026	29	—	—	23	19	—
