= Vincent Kriechmayr =

Austrian alpine skier (born 1991)

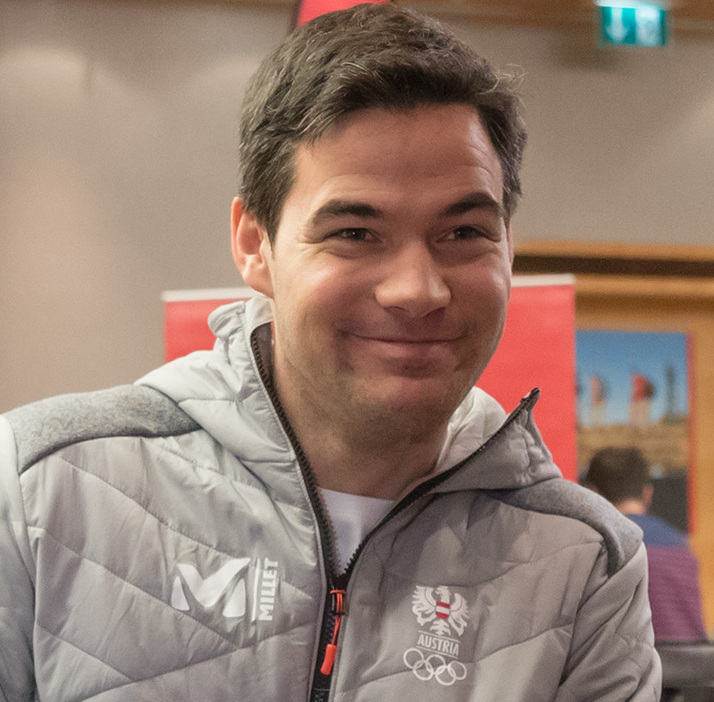
- At the 2018 Winter Olympics

Personal information
- Born: 1 October 1991 (age 35) Linz, Upper Austria, Austria
- Height: 1.86 m (6 ft 1 in)

Skiing career
- Country: Austria
- Sport: Alpine skiing
- Club: TVN Wels – Oberoesterreich
- Disciplines: Super-G, Downhill, Combined
- World Cup debut: 12 December 2010 (age 19)

Olympics
- Teams: 3 – (2018, 2022, 2026)
- Medals: 1 (0 gold)

World Championships
- Teams: 5 – (2017–2025)
- Medals: 5 (2 gold)

World Cup
- Seasons: 13 – (2011–2026)
- Wins: 20 – (10 DH, 10 SG)
- Podiums: 43 – (18 DH, 25 SG)
- Overall titles: 0 – (5th in 2019, 2020, 2022, 2023)
- Discipline titles: 1 – (SG, 2021)
Medal record
Men's alpine skiing
Representing Austria
World Cup race podiums
Event	1st	2nd	3rd
Super-G	10	9	6
Downhill	10	7	1
Total	20	16	7
International alpine ski competitions
Event	1st	2nd	3rd
Olympic Games	0	1	0
World Championships	2	2	1
Total	2	3	1
Olympic Games
Silver medal – second place	2026 Milano Cortina	Team combined
World Championships
Gold medal – first place	2021 Cortina d'Ampezzo	Downhill
Gold medal – first place	2021 Cortina d'Ampezzo	Super-G
Silver medal – second place	2019 Åre	Super-G
Silver medal – second place	2025 Saalbach	Downhill
Bronze medal – third place	2019 Åre	Downhill

Vincent Kriechmayr (born 1 October 1991) is an Austrian World Cup alpine ski racer and specializes in the speed events of super-G and downhill. Kriechmayr is the 2021 world champion in both speed events, super-G and downhill. He won a silver medal for team combined ski at the 2026 Winter Olympics.

== Career ==
Born in Linz, Upper Austria, Kriechmayr made his World Cup debut in December 2010 at age nineteen. He achieved his first World Cup podium in March 2015, a runner-up finish in super-G at Kvitfjell, Norway. He achieved his first World Cup victory in a super-G in December 2017 at Beaver Creek, Colorado. His fourth World Cup victory came in the classic downhill at Wengen in 2019.

At the World Championships in 2021 at Cortina d'Ampezzo, Kriechmayr won both the super-G and the downhill, becoming the third male to take the speed double at the Worlds, after Hermann Maier in 1999 and Bode Miller in 2005. He won the super-G season title in 2021, 83 points ahead of runner-up Marco Odermatt; the super-G at the World Cup finals in Lenzerheide was cancelled due to fog. In October 2021 Kriechmayr was named Austrian sportsman of the year for 2021.

== World Cup results ==
=== Season titles ===
- 1 title – (1 Super-G)

Season	Discipline
2021	Super-G

=== Season standings ===
Season
Season	Age	Overall	Slalom	Giant slalom	Super-G	Downhill	Combined
2014	22	59	—	—	23	—	18
2015	23	24	—	48	6	21	12
2016	24	14	—	58	4	18	10
2017	25	25	—	—	14	14	17
2018	26	7	—	—	2	5	—
2019	27	5	—	55	2	3	9
2020	28	5	—	—	2	6	10
2021	29	6	—	51	1	5	—N/a
2022	30	5	—	—	3	6	—N/a
2023	31	5	—	58	3	2	—N/a
2024	32	6	—	—	2	4	—N/a
2025	33	12	—	—	3	11	—N/a
2026	34	8	—	52	2	4	—N/a

=== Race victories ===
	Total	Super-G	Downhill
Wins	20	10	10
Podiums	43	25	18

Season
Season	Date	Location	Discipline
2018	1 December 2017	Beaver Creek, United States	Super-G
2018	14 March 2018	Åre, Sweden	Downhill
2018	15 March 2018	Åre, Sweden	Super-G
2019	19 January 2019	Wengen, Switzerland	Downhill
2020	20 December 2019	Val Gardena, Italy	Super-G
2020	20 February 2020	Hinterstoder, Austria	Super-G
2021	25 January 2021	Kitzbühel, Austria	Super-G
2021	6 February 2021	Garmisch-Partenkirchen, Germany	Super-G
2021	6 March 2021	Saalbach-Hinterglemm, Austria	Downhill
2022	15 January 2022	Wengen, Switzerland	Downhill
2022	16 March 2022	Courchevel, France	Downhill
2022	17 March 2022	Courchevel, France	Super-G
2023	15 December 2022	Val Gardena, Italy	Downhill
2023	28 December 2022	Bormio, Italy	Downhill
2023	20 January 2023	Kitzbühel, Austria	Downhill
2023	15 March 2023	Soldeu, Andorra	Downhill
2024	15 December 2023	Val Gardena, Italy	Super-G
2024	18 February 2024	Kvitfjell, Norway	Super-G
2026	5 December 2025	Beaver Creek, United States	Super-G
2026	13 March 2026	Courchevel, France	Downhill

== World Championship results ==
Year
Year	Age	Slalom	Giant slalom	Super-G	Downhill	Combined	Team combined
2017	25	—	—	5	19	8	—N/a
2019	27	—	—	2	3	17	—N/a
2021	29	—	—	1	1	DNF2	—N/a
2023	31	—	—	12	11	DNS2	—N/a
2025	33	—	—	4	2	—N/a	DNF2

== Olympic results ==
Year
Year	Age	Slalom	Giant slalom	Super-G	Downhill	Combined	Team combined
2018	26	—	—	6	7	DNF2	—N/a
2022	30	—	—	5	8	—	—N/a
2026	34	—	—	7	6	—N/a	2
