= Alpine skiing at the 2026 Winter Olympics – Men's super-G =

Men's super-G at the XXV Olympic Winter Games
- Alpine skiing
- Venue: Stelvio, Bormio
- Date: 11 February 2026
- Competitors: 42 from 21 nations
- Winning time: 1:25.32

Medalists
1st place, gold medalist(s)		Franjo von Allmen	Switzerland
2nd place, silver medalist(s)		Ryan Cochran-Siegle	United States
3rd place, bronze medalist(s)		Marco Odermatt	Switzerland

Men's Super-G
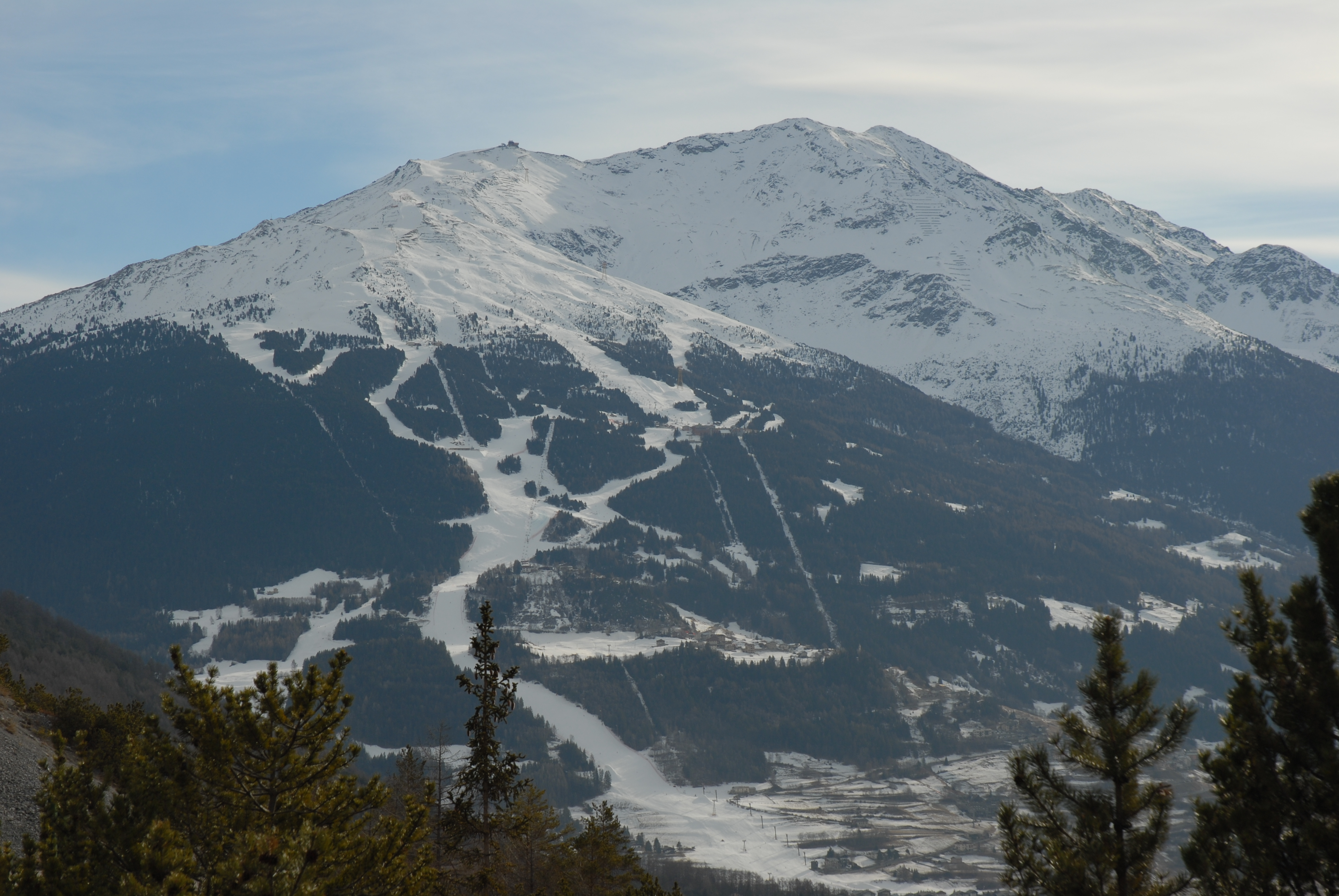
- Location: Stelvio Ski Centre
- Vertical: 714 m (2,343 ft)
- Top elevation: 1,959 m (6,427 ft) AMSL
- Base elevation: 1,245 m (4,085 ft)
- Longest run: 2.414 km (1.50 mi)

The men's super-G competition of the 2026 Winter Olympics was held on Wednesday, 11 February, at Stelvio Ski Centre in Bormio. Franjo von Allmen of Switzerland won the event, adding another gold medal to the ones he got in downhill and in team combined a few days earlier. Ryan Cochran-Siegle of the United States was second, replicating his 2022 performance, and Marco Odermatt of Switzerland came third.

== Background ==
The 2022 champion, Matthias Mayer, retired from international competition three years earlier. The silver medalist, Ryan Cochran-Siegle, qualified for the event. The bronze medalist, Aleksander Aamodt Kilde, withdrew from the 2026 Olympics, hampered by injuries. Prior to the Olympics on the World Cup circuit, Marco Odermatt led in the overall and super-G standings, having won two of six events, and was also the reigning world champion.

== Results ==
The race started at 11:30 local time (UTC+1) under partly cloudy skies. The air temperature was −3.3 °C (26 °F) at the starting gate and 2.3 °C (36 °F) at the finish area; the snow condition was hard packed.

Rank	Bib	Name	Country	Time	Behind
1st place, gold medalist(s)	7	Franjo von Allmen	Switzerland	1:25.32	—
2nd place, silver medalist(s)	3	Ryan Cochran-Siegle	United States	1:25.45	+0.13
3rd place, bronze medalist(s)	10	Marco Odermatt	Switzerland	1:25.60	+0.28
4	1	Nils Allègre	France	1:25.63	+0.31
5	8	Raphael Haaser	Austria	1:25.89	+0.57
6	9	Giovanni Franzoni	Italy	1:25.95	+0.63
7	15	Vincent Kriechmayr	Austria	1:26.10	+0.78
8	12	Fredrik Møller	Norway	1:26.12	+0.80
9	14	Stefan Rogentin	Switzerland	1:26.14	+0.82
10	6	Alexis Monney	Switzerland	1:26.22	+0.90
11	4	Christof Innerhofer	Italy	1:26.50	+1.18
12	19	Adrian Smiseth Sejersted	Norway	1:26.51	+1.19
13	18	Miha Hrobat	Slovenia	1:26.53	+1.21
14	16	Marco Schwarz	Austria	1:26.68	+1.36
15	25	Alban Elezi Cannaferina	France	1:26.77	+1.45
16	2	James Crawford	Canada	1:26.85	+1.53
17	5	Jan Zabystřan	Czech Republic	1:26.87	+1.55
17	20	Cameron Alexander	Canada	1:26.87	+1.55
17	28	Simon Jocher	Germany	1:26.87	+1.55
20	22	Martin Čater	Slovenia	1:26.99	+1.67
21	11	Stefan Babinsky	Austria	1:27.04	+1.72
22	27	Brodie Seger	Canada	1:27.08	+1.76
23	21	Sam Morse	United States	1:27.12	+1.80
24	17	Mattia Casse	Italy	1:27.41	+2.09
25	24	Elian Lehto	Finland	1:27.85	+2.53
26	29	Kyle Negomir	United States	1:28.62	+3.30
28	31	Tiziano Gravier	Argentina	1:29.06	+3.74
27	32	Simen Sellæg	Norway	1:28.63	+3.31
29	34	Anton Grammel	Germany	1:29.39	+4.07
30	40	Arnaud Alessandria	Monaco	1:30.13	+4.81
31	36	Andrej Drukarov	Lithuania	1:30.34	+5.02
32	41	Emeric Guerillot	Portugal	1:31.43	+6.11
33	35	Barnabás Szőllős	Israel	1:31.64	+6.32
34	37	Denni Xhepa	Albania	1:31.34	+6.40
35	38	Elvis Opmanis	Latvia	1:32.05	+6.73
36	39	Dmytro Shepiuk	Ukraine	1:33.16	+7.84
37	42	Cormac Comerford	Ireland	1:34.58	+9.26
	13	Dominik Paris	Italy	DNF	
	23	River Radamus	United States	DNF	
	26	Nils Alphand	France	DNF	
	30	Riley Seger	Canada	DNF	
	33	Marco Pfiffner	Liechtenstein	DNF	
