= Benjamin Alliod =

Italian alpine skier

Personal information
- Full name: Benjamin Jacques Alliod
- Born: 24 January 2000 (age 26) Fénis, Aosta, Italy

Skiing career
- Country: Italy
- Sport: Alpine skiing
- Club: C.S. Esercito
- Disciplines: Speed events
- World Cup debut: 14 December 2023 (age 23)

World Cup
- Seasons: 3 – (2024–2026)
- Podiums: 0
- Overall titles: 0 – (50th in 2026)
- Discipline titles: 0 – (17th in DH, 2026)

Benjamin Jacques Alliod (born 24 January 2000) in Fénis, Aosta, is an Italian World Cup alpine skier who specializes in speed events.

== Career ==
Per the 2025-26 FIS Alpine Ski World Cup, Alliod has finished within the top 5 once - a result which came during the 2025/-26 World Cup season when he finished 5th at the downhill event Crans-Montana. In addition, he has finished within the top 10 once more - an eighth position; this result was achieved at the downhill event during the World Cup Finals in Lillehammer 2026 for which he qualified because he was top 25 in the downhill standings across the 2025/-26 season. In total, Alliod has finished top 20 in World Cup races seven times.

== World Cup results ==
=== Season standings ===
Season
Season	Age	Overall	Slalom	Giant slalom	Super-G	Downhill
2025	25	121	—	—	—	46
2026	26	50	—	—	37	17

=== Top-ten results ===
- 0 podiums, 2 top tens

Season
Season	Date	Location	Discipline	Place
2026	1 February 2026	Crans-Montana, Switzerland	Downhill	5th
2026	21 March 2026	Kvitfjell, Norway	Downhill	8th
