= Elian Lehto =

Finnish alpine skier

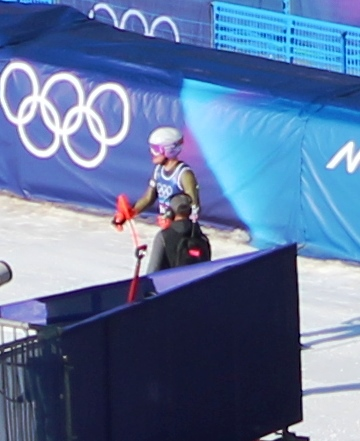
- Lehto at 2026 Winter Olympics

Personal information
- Born: 2 June 2000 (age 26) Forssa, Finland

Skiing career
- Country: Finland
- Sport: Alpine skiing
- Club: Santa Claus Ski Team
- Disciplines: Downhill, super-G
- World Cup debut: 19 December 2018 (age 18)

Olympics
- Teams: 1 – (2026)
- Medals: 0

World Championships
- Teams: 3 – (2019, 2023, 2025)
- Medals: 0

World Cup
- Seasons: 6 – (2019, 2022–2026)
- Podiums: 0
- Overall titles: 0 – (69th in 2024)
- Discipline titles: 0 – (22nd in DH, 2025)

Elian Lehto (born 2 June 2000) is a Finnish World Cup alpine skier who specializes in the speed events of downhill and super-G. He has represented Finland at the 2026 Winter Olympics and three World Championships.

== Career ==
Lehto has finished in the top 10 three times in World Cup races since 2026.

Thanks to his World Cup season in 2026, he qualified for the Kvitfjell finals in downhill. Only the top 25 athletes in the specialty standing get this right.

== Crash in Garmisch 2026 ==
On 27 February 2026 during the training for the World Cup downhill in Garmisch, following a bad fall, there were fears for his health conditions. He was transported by helicopter after a few days spent in German hospitals and returned to Finland. In a 9 March 2026 interview he spoke of his very bad crash, in which he suffered a blow to the head. He said that once the condition of his knee had been assessed, he would return to training and therefore to skiing.

== World Cup results ==
=== Season standings ===
Season
Season	Age	Overall	Slalom	Giant slalom	Super-G	Downhill
2023	22	130	—	—	—	23
2024	23	69	—	—	39	25
2025	24	70	—	—	39	22
2026	25	74	—	—	50	24

=== Top-ten results ===
Season
Season	Date	Location	Discipline	Place
2025	22 February 2025	Crans-Montana, Switzerland	Downhill	10th
2026	18 December 2025	Val Gardena, Italy	Downhill	10th
2026	20 December 2025	Val Gardena, Italy	Downhill	10th

== World Championship results ==
Year
Year	Age	Slalom	Giant slalom	Super-G	Downhill	Combined	Team combined
2019	18	—	DNF1	—	—	—	—N/a
2023	22	—	—	22	25	DNF2	—N/a
2025	24	—	—	26	14	—N/a	DNF2

== Olympic results ==
Year
Year	Age	Slalom	Giant slalom	Super-G	Downhill	Team combined
2026	25	—	—	25	20	9
