= 2026 Alpine Skiing World Cup – Men's super-G =

Alpine ski discipline year standings

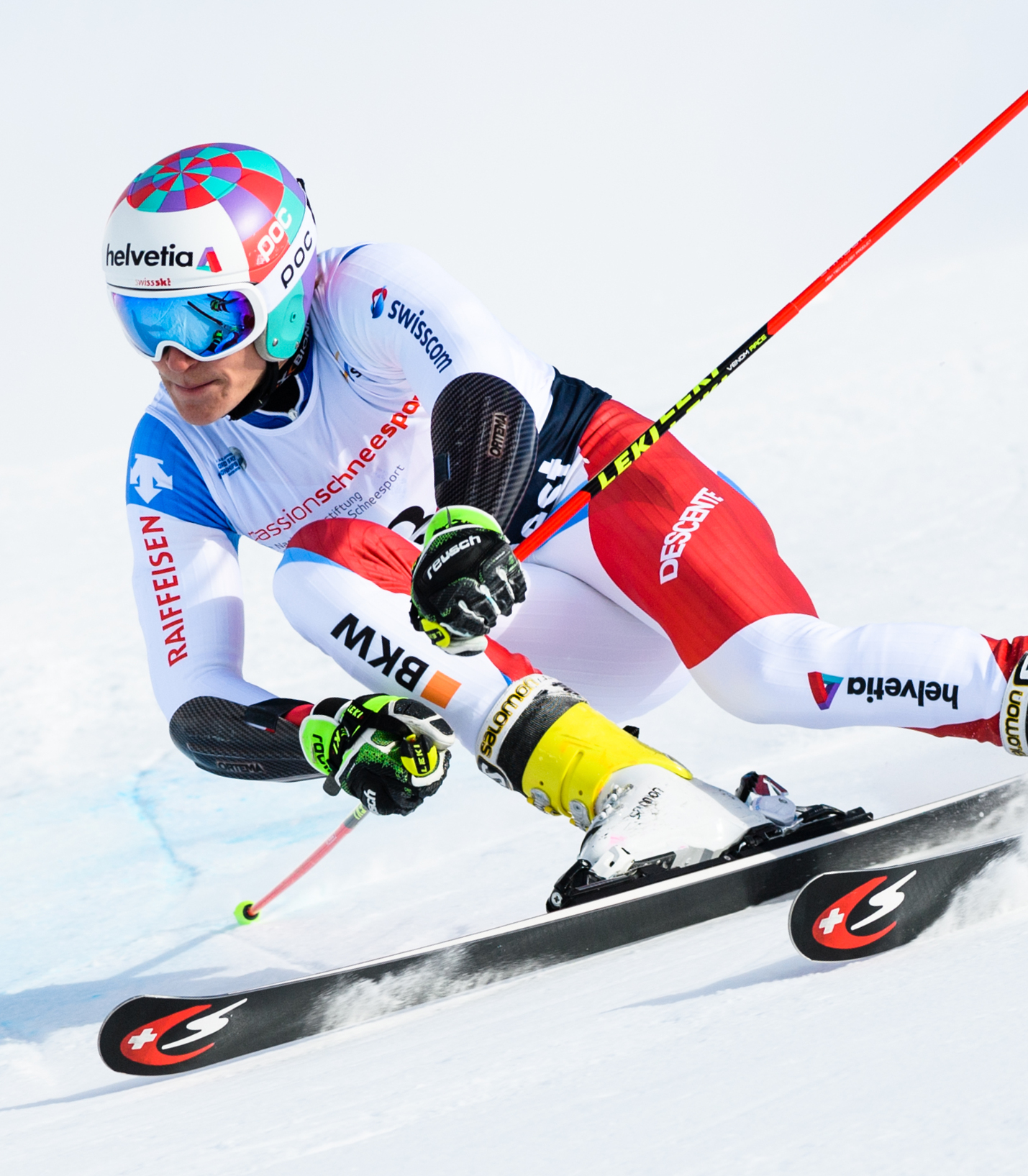
2026 Men's Super-G World Cup: Marco Odermatt of Switzerland, season champion for the fourth consecutive season; 2026 Men's World Cup; Overall • Downhill • Super-G; Giant slalom • Slalom
Previous: 2025	Next: 2027

The men's super-G in the 2026 FIS Alpine Skiing World Cup was scheduled to consist of nine events, including the final, but was shortened to seven events after the seventh race was postponed and then cancelled and the eighth race was also cancelled. The season began with a super-G at Copper Mountain, Colorado (U.S.) on 27 November 2025 (the first World Cup visit to Copper Mountain for the men since 1976), followed by a visit to nearby Beaver Creek on 6 December 2025 and then proceeded to Europe for the remainder of the races, following the initial schedule released on 12 June 2025. Among those races is a first: for the first time ever, an Alpine World Cup race is being held in Livigno, Italy, on the Tagliede – Li Zeta slope. For the fourth consecutive season, Marco Odermatt of Switzerland won the discipline championship.

The season was interrupted for the quadrennial 2026 Winter Olympics in three regions in Italy – Milan, the Stelvio Pass, and Cortina d'Ampezzo – during 6–22 February 2026. All of the Alpine skiing events for men took place on the classic Stelvio course at Bormio. The championship in men's super-G was held on Wednesday, 11 February, and was won by Odermatt's teammate, Switzerland's Franjo von Allmen, who won all three of the gold medals in speed events at the Olympics.

== Season summary ==
The season-opening race at Copper Mountain came down to a two-man battle, but defending discipline champion Marco Odermatt of Switzerland edged Austria's Vincent Kriechmayr by .08 seconds for the victory, in a race that was also noted for the return after almost two years (from a life-threatening injury suffered in January 2024) of former overall champion Aleksander Aamodt Kilde of Norway, who is also the fiancé of American star Mikaela Shiffrin, and Shiffrin was present at the finish line to greet him. The super-G at Beaver Creek the next week battled high winds and fresh snow, and a crash by Switzerland's Franjo von Allmen, starting 14th, led to a delay, after which none of the later runners were able to crack the top ten, and the weather conditions led to the race being stopped after 31 racers had gone; the winner was Kriechmayr, who had started sixth and defeated the field (except for Fredrik Møller of Norway) by over a second, giving him the overall lead in the discipline. After this race, the super-G season continued in Europe, but an unusual late weather shift at Val Gardena/Gröden (in the Italian Dolomites) allowed the later racers to have clear visibility, while the earlier racers had dealt with overcast skies, and led to the first victory ever on the World Cup circuit for a male Czech skier – Jan Zabystřan, who started 29th. Odermatt, the only skier among the first ten starters to finish in the top ten, was second and regained the discipline lead over Kriechmayr, who started 13th and finished ninth. In the last race in the 2025 calendar year, which (as noted above) was the first World Cup race ever at Livigno (Italy), a potential all-Swiss podium (Alexis Monney, von Allmen, and Odermatt) was broken up by the first super-G victory ever from Austria's Marco Schwarz, an all-event competitor who had missed most of the prior two years due to a serious injury and a number of mishaps during recovery, but had won a giant slalom just six days prior at Alta Badia for his first victory in any discipline since his return.

The first super-G of 2026 was run at Wengen, Switzerland on 15 January, in bright sunshine, which led to melting snow, and the first racer down the course – Giovanni Franzoni of Italy – set the fastest time for his first World Cup win, with the other two podium finishers starting 4th (Stefan Babinsky of Austria, his first World Cup podium) and 8th (von Allmen) as the conditions continued to deteriorate. The following weekend at Kitzbühel, Austria, Odermatt barely edged his teammate von Allmen by 0.03 seconds for his 53rd career World Cup win, in what turned out to be a close race all the way down to Franzoni in 12th, just 0.66 seconds behind Odermatt. At the Milan Cortina Winter Olympics in Bormio (Italy), von Allman finally came out on top, winning the gold medal (his record-tying third), after three straight podiums in super-G without a victory, with discipline leader Odermatt picking up bronze and the 2022 silver medalist, Ryan Cochran-Siegle of the U.S., earning another silver.

After the Olympics, the race at Garmisch-Partenkirchen (Germany) was cancelled due to persistent fog, which affected the course even after the start gate was lowered, and was rescheduled for 14 March at Courchevel (France), to precede the downhill and super-G already scheduled there on 14-15 March. However, the rescheduled race at Courchevel also had to be canceled due to continuing heavy snowfall and fog, and this time it was not rescheduled and thus canceled, leaving Odermatt with a 158-point lead with only 200 points remaining. The original super-G scheduled for Courchevel, which was to take place the next day, also had to be canceled after the snowfall continued overnight until after 6 AM, which left the course with a powder covering of dead snow that was unsuitable for racing, thus giving Odermatt the discipline title for the fourth straight season.

== Finals ==
The World Cup finals in the discipline are scheduled to take place on Sunday, 22 March 2026 on the Olympiabakken course at Kvitfjell, near Lillehammer, Norway. Only the top 25 skiers in the World Cup super-G discipline and the winner of the 2026 FIS Junior World Championships in the discipline (Victor Haghighat of France), plus any skiers who have scored at least 500 points in the World Cup overall classification for the season, will be eligible to compete in the final, and only the top 15 will earn World Cup points. None of the 500-point skiers chose to enter, so the starting field was all 25 qualifiers plus Haghighat, or 26. Dominik Paris of Italy, who had won the downhill the day before, edged Kriechmayr by .07 seconds to capture the speed double at finals, although Kriechmayr finished second for the season behind Odermatt and his teammate Raphael Haaser, who was third on the day, was also third for the season.

== Standings ==
	Venue	27 Nov 2025; Copper Mountain	5 Dec 2025; Beaver Creek	19 Dec 2025; Val Gardena/Gröden	27 Dec 2025; Livigno	16 Jan 2026; Wengen	23 Jan 2026; Kitzbühel	11 Feb 2026; Bormio	1 Mar 2026; Garmisch	14 Mar 2026; Courchevel R#	15 Mar 2026; Courchevel	22 Mar 2026; Kvitfjell	
#	Skier	(United States)	(United States)	(Italy)	(Italy)	(Switzerland)	(Austria)	(Italy)	(Germany)	(France)	(France)	(Norway)	Total
	(Switzerland) Marco Odermatt	100	45	80	50	50	100	③	x	x		0	425
2	(Austria) Vincent Kriechmayr	80	100	29	DNF	22	36	⑦	x	x		80	347
3	(Austria) Raphael Haaser	60	60	26	DNF	45	50	⑤	x	x		60	301
4	(Italy) Giovanni Franzoni	20	26	60	12	100	22	⑥	x	x		45	285
5	(Italy) Dominik Paris	24	50	6	45	DNF	32	DNF	x	x		100	257
6	(Switzerland) Franjo von Allmen	29	DNF	DNF	60	60	80	①	x	x		26	255
7	(Austria) Stefan Babinsky	50	29	0	24	80	60	㉑	x	x		0	243
8	(Switzerland) Stefan Rogentin	36	32	32	32	36	32	⑨	x	x		40	208
9	(Switzerland) Alexis Monney	11	14	22	80	12	0	⑩	x	x		50	189
10	(Austria) Marco Schwarz	14	11	20	100	DNS	6	⑭	x	x		32	183
11	(Norway) Fredrik Møller	45	80	DNS			7	⑧	x	x		36	168
12	(Czech Republic) Jan Zabystřan	5	18	100	10	18	12	⑰	x	x		0	163
13	(France) Nils Allègre	3	24	50	26	26	18	④	x	x		0	147
14	(Italy) Mattia Casse	5	9	24	0	32	40	㉔	x	x		29	139
15	(United States) Ryan Cochran-Siegle	26	20	0	20	40	0	②	x	x		22	128
16	(Norway) Adrian Smiseth Sejersted	12	12	DNF	3	29	45	⑫	x	x		24	125
17	(Austria) Daniel Hemetsberger	16	13	36	10	24	14	DNS	x	x		0	113
18	(Italy) Guglielmo Bosca	32	10	0	32	DNF	0	DNS	x	x		22	96
19	(Austria) Lukas Feurstein	40	16	0	14	20	0	DNS	x	x		0	90
20	(Italy) Christof Innerhofer	2	8	40	0	10	26	⑪	x	x		0	86
21	(Germany) Simon Jocher	11	DNS	2	45	4	DNF	⑰	x	x		18	80
22	(Canada) James Crawford	15	36	0	0	11	10	⑯	x	x		0	72
23	(France) Matthieu Bailet	0	DNS	45	DNF	0	10	DNS	x	x		16	71
24	(Canada) Cameron Alexander	0	DNF	15	15	7	24	⑰	x	x		0	61
25	(United States) River Radamus	9	22	0	18	5	0	DNF	x	x		0	54
26	(United States) Kyle Negomir	7	DNS	12	7	15	5	㉖	x	x		NE	46
27	(Switzerland) Loïc Meillard	0	DNF	DNS	36	9	DNS	DNS	DNS				45
28	(Austria) Stefan Eichberger	DNF	40	DNS								NE	40
29	(Switzerland) Marco Kohler	DNS		8	24	1	4	DNS	DNS			NE	37
30	(France) Alban Elezi Cannaferina	13	DNS	DNS	4	DNF	18	⑮	x	x		NE	35
31	(Slovenia) Miha Hrobat	20	7	3	DNF	DNF	1	⑬	x	x		NE	31
32	(Canada) Brodie Seger	0	DNS	18	13	DNF	DNF	㉒	x	x		NE	31
33	(United States) Sam Morse	0	DNS	1	0	16	13	㉓	x	x		NE	30
34	(Canada) Riley Seger	0	DNS	16	8	2	3	DNF	x	x		NE	29
35	(Switzerland) Justin Murisier	1	15	8	DNF	3	0	DNS	x	x		NE	27
36	(France) Sam Alphand	DNS		DNF	1	8	15	DNS	x	x		NE	24
37	(Italy) Benjamin Jacques Alliod	0	DNS	0	DNF	13	10	DNS	x	x		NE	23
38	(Norway) Atle Lie McGrath	22	DNS										22
39	(Italy) Florian Schieder	0	DNS	DNF	16	6	DNF	DNS	x	x		NE	22
40	(France) Nils Alphand	0	DNS	DNF	DNF	DNF	20	DNF	DNS			NE	20
41	(Austria) Vincent Wieser	0	DNS	9	11	0	0	DNS	x	x		NE	20
42	(Canada) Jeffrey Read	0	DNF	14	5	0	0	DNS	x	x		NE	19
43	(Germany) Romed Baumann	0	DNS	14	0	0	DNF	DNS	x	DNS		NE	14
44	(Austria) Andreas Ploier	0	DNS	DNF	DNF	14	DNF	DNS	x	DNS		NE	14
45	(France) Blaise Giezendanner	0	DNS	0	0	0	11	DNS	x	x		NE	11
46	(Canada) Raphaël Lessard	0	DNS	11	DNS							NE	11
47	(Norway) Aleksander Aamodt Kilde	7	DNF	4	0	DNS	DNS	DNS				NE	11
48	(Switzerland) Alessio Miggiano	DNS		10	0	0	DNF	DNS	x	x		NE	10
49	(Italy) Nicolo Molteni	8	DNS	DNS								NE	8
50	(Finland) Elian Lehto	0	DNS	0	6	0	DNF	㉕	DNS			NE	6
51	(United States) Jared Goldberg	0	6	DNF	DNF	0	0	DNS	x	x		NE	6
52	(United States) Bryce Bennett	0	DNS	5	0	0	0	DNS	x	x		NE	5
53	(Italy) Max Perathoner	DNS		DNF	2	DNS	3	DNS	x	x		NE	5
	References												

=== Legend ===
- Winner (100 points)
- 2nd place (80 points)
- 3rd place (60 points)
- DNF = Did not finish
- DSQ = Disqualified
- Did not start (DNS)
- Not eligible for finals (NE)
- Race canceled (x)
- FIS non-World Cup race (Olympics)
- R# = Rescheduled (make-up) race
- Updated at 22 March 2026, after all events.

== See also ==
- 2026 Alpine Skiing World Cup – Men's summary rankings
- 2026 Alpine Skiing World Cup – Men's overall
- 2026 Alpine Skiing World Cup – Men's downhill
- 2026 Alpine Skiing World Cup – Men's giant slalom
- 2026 Alpine Skiing World Cup – Men's slalom
- World Cup scoring system
