= Cameron Alexander (alpine skier) =

Canadian alpine skier (born 1997)

Personal information
- Born: 31 May 1997 (age 29) North Vancouver, British Columbia, Canada

Skiing career
- Country: Canada
- Sport: Alpine skiing
- Club: Whistler Mountain SC
- Disciplines: Downhill, Super-G
- World Cup debut: November 2019 (age 22)

Olympics
- Teams: 1 – (2026)
- Medals: 0

World Championships
- Teams: 1 – (2023)
- Medals: 1 (0 gold)

World Cup
- Seasons: 7 – (2020–2026)
- Wins: 1 – (1 DH)
- Podiums: 5 – (5 DH)
- Overall titles: 0 – (22nd in 2025)
- Discipline titles: 0 – (9th in DH, 2024, 2025)
Medal record
Men's alpine skiing
Representing Canada
World Championships
Bronze medal – third place	2023 Courchevel	Downhill

Cameron Alexander (born 31 May 1997) is a Canadian World Cup alpine ski racer and specializes in the speed events of downhill and super-G. He made his World Cup debut at age 22 at Lake Louise in November 2019, and gained his first victory (and podium) in a downhill at Kvitfjell in March 2022.

Alexander won the bronze medal in the downhill at the World Championships in 2023.

== Career ==
Through January 2026, Alexander has eighteen top ten finishes in World Cup events, with one victory and five podiums.

== World Cup results ==
=== Season standings ===
Season
Season	Age	Overall	Slalom	Giant slalom	Super-G	Downhill
2020	22	103	—	—	—	35
2021	23	injured after 1 race				
2022	24	68	—	—	—	21
2023	25	64	—	—	52	23
2024	26	26	—	—	20	9
2025	27	22	—	—	14	9
2026	28	35	—	—	24	15

=== Race podiums ===
- 1 win (1 DH)
- 5 podiums (5 DH); 18 top tens (13 DH, 5 SG)

Season
Season	Date	Location	Discipline	Place
2022	4 March 2022	Kvitfjell, Norway	Downhill	1st
2024	28 December 2023	Bormio, Italy	Downhill	3rd
2024	17 February 2024	Kvitfjell, Norway	Downhill	3rd
2025	28 December 2024	Bormio, Italy	Downhill	3rd
2025	25 January 2025	Kitzbühel, Austria	Downhill	3rd

== World Championship results ==
Year
Year	Age	Slalom	Giant slalom	Super-G	Downhill	Combined	Team combined	Parallel	Team event
2023	25	—	—	—	3	—	—N/a	—	—
2025	27	—	—	—	3	—N/a	—	—N/a	—

== Olympics results ==
Year
Year	Age	Slalom	Giant slalom	Super-G	Downhill	Team combined
2026	26	—	—	17	14	—
