= Dominik Paris =

Italian alpine skier (born 1989)

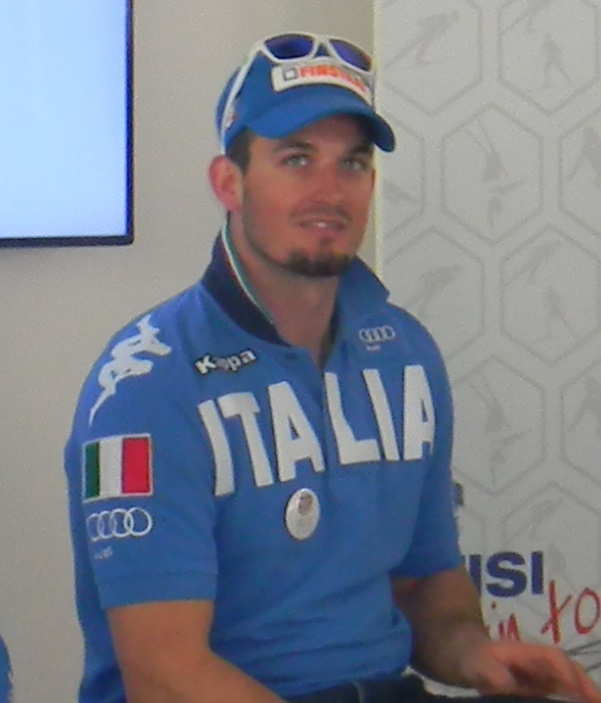
- October 2014

Personal information
- Born: 14 April 1989 (age 37) Merano, South Tyrol, Italy
- Height: 1.83 m (6 ft 0 in)
- Website: dominikparis.com

Skiing career
- Country: Italy
- Sport: Alpine skiing
- Club: C.S. Carabinieri (previously G.S. Forestale)
- Disciplines: Downhill, Super-G, Combined
- World Cup debut: 19 December 2008 (age 19)

Olympics
- Teams: 5 – (2010–2026)
- Medals: 1 (0 gold)

World Championships
- Teams: 8 – (2011–2025)
- Medals: 2 (1 gold)

World Cup
- Seasons: 18 – (2009–2026)
- Wins: 26 – (20 DH, 6 SG)
- Podiums: 54 – (35 DH, 18 SG, 1 AC)
- Overall titles: 0 – (4th in 2019)
- Discipline titles: 1 – (SG, 2019)
Medal record
Men's alpine skiing
Representing Italy
World Cup race podiums
Event	1st	2nd	3rd
Super-G	6	4	8
Downhill	20	7	8
Combined	0	1	0
Total	26	12	16
International alpine ski competitions
Event	1st	2nd	3rd
Olympic Games	0	0	1
World Championships	1	1	0
Total	1	1	1
Olympic Games
Bronze medal – third place	2026 Milano Cortina	Downhill
World Championships
Gold medal – first place	2019 Åre	Super-G
Silver medal – second place	2013 Schladming	Downhill
Junior World Championships
Silver medal – second place	2009 Garmisch-Partenkirchen	Downhill
Silver medal – second place	2009 Garmisch-Partenkirchen	Combined
Bronze medal – third place	2009 Garmisch-Partenkirchen	Super-G

Dominik Paris (born 14 April 1989) is an Italian alpine ski racer, who specializes in speed events of super-G and downhill. He was the world champion in super-G, as the gold medalist in 2019 at Åre, Sweden.

== Racing career ==
Paris made his World Cup debut in December 2008 and won his first World Cup race in late December 2012 in Italy, a dead-heat tie with Hannes Reichelt in the downhill on the Pista Stelvio at Bormio. Aksel Lund Svindal was just one-hundredth of a second behind for third, and Klaus Kröll was fourth, just one hundredth behind Svindal. It was the closest top-four finish in World Cup downhill history (0.02 of a second) and the first tie in a men's downhill in nearly 35 years (January 1978). Four weeks later, Paris firmly established himself as a top downhill racer on the circuit with a win at Kitzbühel on the classic Streif course.

At the 2013 World Championships in Austria, Paris won the silver medal in the downhill, 0.46 seconds behind gold medalist Aksel Lund Svindal.

Paris gained his first victory in super-G at Kitzbühel in 2015 and placed second in the downhill the next day. Two years later in 2017, he won his second downhill on the Streif course and in 2019 he concluded a "Hahnenkamm hat trick" with his third downhill win at Kitzbühel. This third victory ties him with Pirmin Zurbriggen, Luc Alphand, and Franz Heinzer as the third most successful downhill racer at Kitzbühel; only Franz Klammer, Karl Schranz (4x), and Didier Cuche (5x) won more often - but only few of them on the entire length of the original 'Streif' run.

In the 2019 season, after double victories at both Bormio and Kvitfjell, Paris added a double victory at the World Cup finals in Soldeu, where he won his first crystal globe, in the super-G. A month earlier, he won the gold medal in the same event at the World Championships in Åre, Sweden.

Paris started the 2019–2020 season with runner-up finishes in the first two speed events at Lake Louise, Canada. On 27–28 December 2019 he won consecutive World Cup downhills in Bormio, becoming the first in history to achieve five downhill victories – four in a row – on the Stelvio course. In late January, three days after his first-ever podium on the classic Lauberhorn downhill, Paris suffered an ACL injury to his right knee during a training session, ending his season.

As of February 2026, he has 24 World Cup wins and 52 podiums.

== World Cup results ==
=== Season titles ===
- 1 title – (1 SG)

Season	Discipline
2019	Super-G

=== Season standings ===
Season
Season	Age	Overall	Slalom	Giant slalom	Super-G	Downhill	Combined
2010	20	72	—	—	37	43	21
2011	21	47	—	—	55	21	20
2012	22	31	—	—	52	14	18
2013	23	14	—	—	23	3	11
2014	24	35	—	—	32	15	22
2015	25	7	—	—	2	5	36
2016	26	6	—	—	10	3	4
2017	27	8	—	56	4	3	39
2018	28	12	—	—	16	4	11
2019	29	4	—	—	1	2	—
2020 (Note: Season-ending injury in late January 2020)	30	11	—	—	10	5	23
2021	31	15	—	—	19	3	—N/a
2022	32	8	—	—	9	3	—N/a
2023	33	18	—	—	9	11	—N/a
2024	34	8	—	—	7	3	—N/a
2025	35	11	—	—	6	6	—N/a
2026	36	9	—	—	5	3	—N/a

=== Race victories ===
	Total	Downhill	Super-G	Combined
Wins	26	20	6	0
Podiums	54	35	18	1

Season
Season	Date	Location	Discipline
2013	29 December 2012	Bormio, Italy	Downhill
2013	26 January 2013	Kitzbühel, Austria	Downhill
2014	30 November 2013	Lake Louise, Canada	Downhill
2015	23 January 2015	Kitzbühel, Austria	Super-G
2016	20 February 2016	Chamonix, France	Downhill
2016	12 March 2016	Kvitfjell, Norway	Downhill
2017	21 January 2017	Kitzbühel, Austria	Downhill
2017	15 March 2017	Aspen, United States	Downhill
2018	28 December 2017	Bormio, Italy	Downhill
2019	28 December 2018	Bormio, Italy	Downhill
2019	29 December 2018	Bormio, Italy	Super-G
2019	25 January 2019	Kitzbühel, Austria	Downhill
2019	2 March 2019	Kvitfjell, Norway	Downhill
2019	3 March 2019	Kvitfjell, Norway	Super-G
2019	13 March 2019	Soldeu, Andorra	Downhill
2019	14 March 2019	Soldeu, Andorra	Super-G
2020	27 December 2019	Bormio, Italy	Downhill
2020	28 December 2019	Bormio, Italy	Downhill
2021	5 February 2021	Garmisch-Partenkirchen, Germany	Downhill
2022	28 December 2021	Bormio, Italy	Downhill
2022	5 March 2022	Kvitfjell, Norway	Downhill
2024	16 December 2023	Val Gardena, Italy	Downhill
2025	7 March 2025	Kvitfjell, Norway	Downhill
2025	9 March 2025	Kvitfjell, Norway	Super-G
2026	21 March 2026	Kvitfjell, Norway	Downhill
2026	22 March 2026	Kvitfjell, Norway	Super-G

== World Championship results ==
Year
Year	Age	Slalom	Giant slalom	Super-G	Downhill	Combined	Team combined
2011	21	—	—	—	20	DNF2	—N/a
2013	23	—	—	—	2	9	—N/a
2015	25	—	—	14	23	10	—N/a
2017	27	—	—	9	13	4	—N/a
2019	29	—	—	1	6	9	—N/a
2021	31	—	—	5	4	—	—N/a
2023	33	—	—	DNF	8	DSQ1	—N/a
2025	35	—	—	7	4	—N/a	DNF2

== Olympic results ==
Year
Year	Age	Slalom	Giant slalom	Super-G	Downhill	Combined	Team combined
2010	20	—	—	—	—	13	—N/a
2014	24	—	—	16	11	18	—N/a
2018	28	—	—	7	4	DNF2	—N/a
2022	32	—	—	21	6	—	—N/a
2026	36	—	—	DNF	3	—N/a	5

== Musical career ==
Dominik Paris is the singer of the metal band Rise of Voltage, from its foundation in 2017. The other members of the band are Lukas Paris (guitar, brother of Dominik), Frank Pichler (bass) and Florian Schwienbacher (drums). The band has one full-length album, Time, published in 2018.

== See also ==
- Italian skiers who closed in top 10 in overall World Cup
