= Marco Odermatt =

Swiss alpine skier (born 1997)

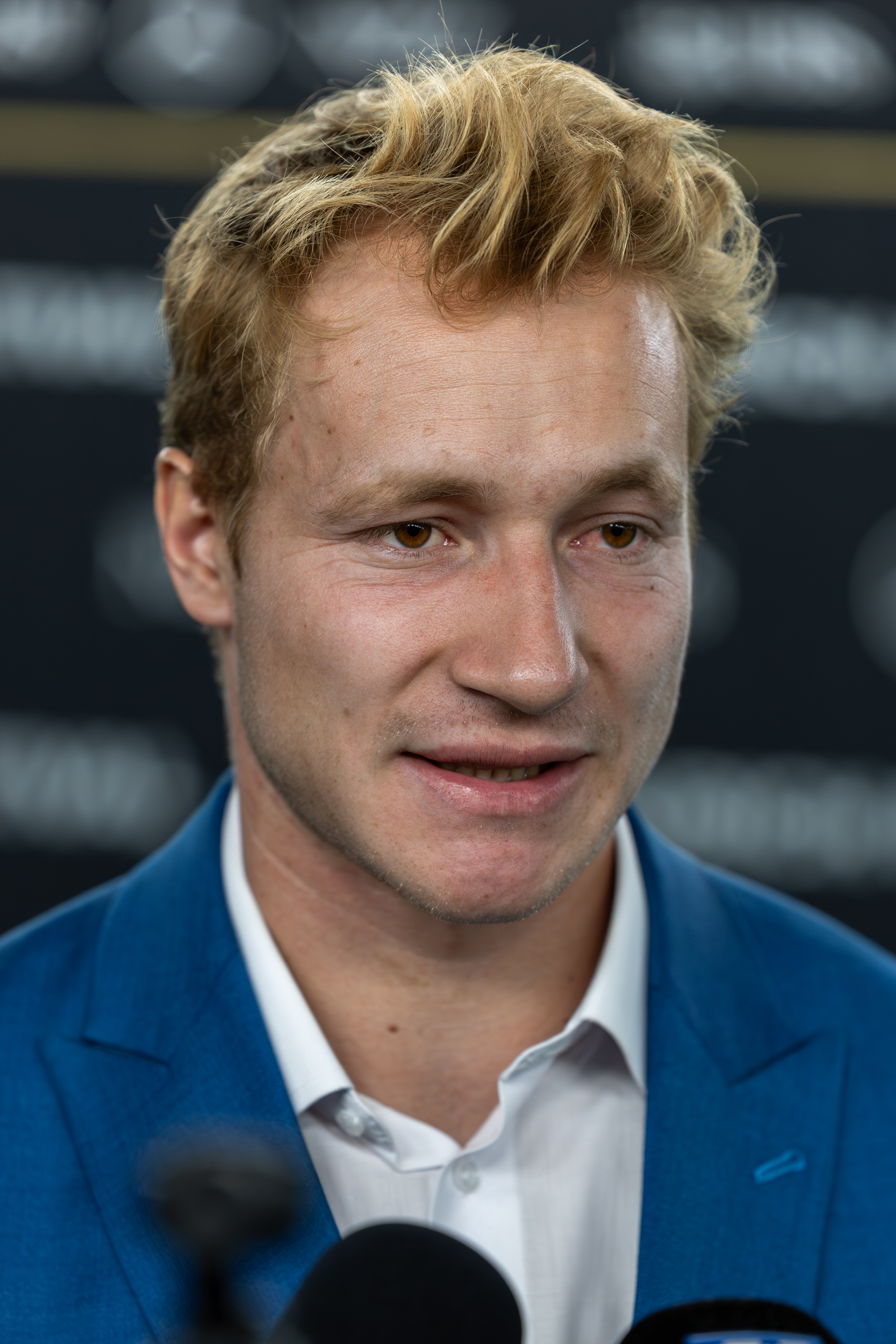
- At the 2025 Zurich Film Festival

Personal information
- Born: 8 October 1997 (age 29) Stans, Nidwalden, Switzerland
- Height: 1.83 m (6 ft 0 in)
- Website: marcoodermatt.com

Skiing career
- Country: Switzerland
- Sport: Alpine skiing
- Club: SC Hergiswil
- Disciplines: Downhill, Super-G; Giant slalom
- World Cup debut: 19 March 2016 (age 18)

Olympics
- Teams: 2 – (2022, 2026)
- Medals: 4 (1 gold)

World Championships
- Teams: 4 – (2019–2025)
- Medals: 3 (3 gold)

World Cup
- Seasons: 11 – (2016–2026)
- Wins: 54 – (29 GS, 17 SG, 8 DH)
- Podiums: 103 – (47 GS, 28 SG, 28 DH)
- Overall titles: 5 – (2022, 2023, 2024, 2025, 2026)
- Discipline titles: 11 – (GS – 2022, 2023, 2024, 2025; SG – 2023, 2024, 2025, 2026; DH – 2024, 2025, 2026)
Medal record
Men's alpine skiing
Representing Switzerland
World Cup race podiums
Event	1st	2nd	3rd
Giant slalom	29	9	9
Super-G	17	6	5
Downhill	8	15	5
Total	54	30	19
Olympic Games
Gold medal – first place	2022 Beijing	Giant slalom
Silver medal – second place	2026 Milano Cortina	Giant slalom
Silver medal – second place	2026 Milano Cortina	Team combined
Bronze medal – third place	2026 Milano Cortina	Super-G
World Championships
Gold medal – first place	2023 Courchevel	Downhill
Gold medal – first place	2023 Courchevel	Giant slalom
Gold medal – first place	2025 Saalbach	Super-G
Junior World Championships
Gold medal – first place	2016 Sochi	Giant slalom
Gold medal – first place	2018 Davos	Combined
Gold medal – first place	2018 Davos	Downhill
Gold medal – first place	2018 Davos	Super-G
Gold medal – first place	2018 Davos	Giant slalom
Gold medal – first place	2018 Davos	Team Event
Bronze medal – third place	2016 Sochi	Super-G

Marco Odermatt (born 8 October 1997) is a Swiss World Cup alpine ski racer who races in downhill, super-G and giant slalom. In addition to the World Cup, Odermatt has competed for Switzerland at two Junior World Championships, three World Championships, the 2022 (where he won an Olympic gold medal) and 2026 Winter Olympics.

== Career ==
At the 2016 Junior World Championships in Sochi, Odermatt won the bronze medal in super-G and the gold medal in giant slalom, which allowed him to make his World Cup debut in March 2016 in the giant slalom at the season finals in St. Moritz. At the 2018 Junior World Championships in Davos, Odermatt won an unprecedented five gold medals (combined, downhill, super-G, giant slalom, and team event).

He gained his first World Cup podium at Kranjska Gora in March 2019, and his first win in December 2019 in a super-G at Beaver Creek. In the next season, Odermatt achieved his first victory in giant slalom in Santa Caterina and finished second in the giant slalom and overall World Cup titles, both times after Alexis Pinturault.

Odermatt had his breakthrough in the 2021–22 season, winning seven races as well as the overall and giant slalom season titles. He achieved his childhood dream of winning the historic giant slalom in Adelboden and represented Switzerland at the 2022 Winter Olympics, where he won the gold medal in the giant slalom, recording the fastest time in the first run and finishing 0.19 seconds ahead of runner-up Žan Kranjec. The next season, Odermatt set a new record for overall men's points in a World Cup season with 2,042, overtaking Hermann Maier, and tied Maier (2000–01), Ingemar Stenmark (1978–79) and Marcel Hirscher (2017–18) for the men's record for most wins in a World Cup season with 13. He also won gold medals in downhill and giant slalom at the 2023 World Ski Championships, recording his first win in a professional downhill event.

In the 2023–24 season, Odermatt again claimed 13 wins, including the first nine giant slalom races, and became the fourth man in World Cup history to win four season titles in the same year, claiming the overall, downhill, super-G and giant slalom globes. The following year, Odermatt surpassed Pirmin Zurbriggen as the most successful male Swiss skier in World Cup history with his 41st victory, and became the second man to win four consecutive GS races in Adelboden after Stenmark (1979–1982).

He opened the 2025–26 season with a giant slalom victory in Sölden, followed by a super-G victory in Copper Mountain.

In October 2026 he was awarded the title of Doctor honoris causa by EPFL.

== Personal life ==
Odermatt is in a relationship with Stella Parpan, who in 2023 was a nurse studying to become a physician and whom he has known since kindergarten.

== World Cup results ==
- 16 titles – (5 Overall, 4 Giant Slalom, 4 Super-G, 3 Downhill)

=== Season titles ===
Season	
Season	Discipline
2022	Overall
2022	Giant slalom
2023	Overall
2023	Super-G
2023	Giant slalom
2024	Overall
2024	Super-G
2024	Giant slalom
2024	Downhill
2025	Overall
2025	Giant slalom
2025	Super-G
2025	Downhill
2026	Overall
2026	Super-G
2026	Downhill

=== Season standings ===
Season
Season	Age	Overall	Slalom	Giant slalom	Super-G	Downhill	Combined
2016	18	163	—	58	—	—	—
2017	19	114	—	41	—	—	—
2018	20	76	—	46	34	38	—
2019	21	24	—	8	20	53	35
2020	22	17	—	9	7	43	—
2021	23	2	—	2	2	16	—N/a
2022	24	1	—	1	2	4	—N/a
2023	25	1	—	1	1	3	—N/a
2024	26	1	—	1	1	1	—N/a
2025	27	1	—	1	1	1	—N/a
2026	28	1	—	2	1	1	—N/a
2027	29	3	—	3	—	—	—N/a

Standings through 26 October 2026

=== Race victories ===
	Total	Giant slalom	Super-G	Downhill
Wins	54	29	17	8
Podiums	103	47	28	28

Season
Season	Date	Location	Discipline
2020	6 December 2019	Beaver Creek, United States	Super-G
2021 3 victories (2 GS, 1 SG)	7 December 2020	Santa Caterina, Italy	Giant slalom
2021 3 victories (2 GS, 1 SG)	7 March 2021	Saalbach-Hinterglemm, Austria	Super-G
2021 3 victories (2 GS, 1 SG)	13 March 2021	Kranjska Gora, Slovenia	Giant slalom
2022 7 victories (5 GS, 2 SG)	24 October 2021	Sölden, Austria	Giant slalom
2022 7 victories (5 GS, 2 SG)	2 December 2021	Beaver Creek, United States	Super-G
2022 7 victories (5 GS, 2 SG)	11 December 2021	Val d'Isère, France	Giant slalom
2022 7 victories (5 GS, 2 SG)	20 December 2021	Alta Badia, Italy	Giant slalom
2022 7 victories (5 GS, 2 SG)	8 January 2022	Adelboden, Switzerland	Giant slalom
2022 7 victories (5 GS, 2 SG)	13 January 2022	Wengen, Switzerland	Super-G
2022 7 victories (5 GS, 2 SG)	19 March 2022	Méribel, France	Giant slalom
2023 13 victories (7 GS, 6 SG)	23 October 2022	Sölden, Austria	Giant slalom
2023 13 victories (7 GS, 6 SG)	27 November 2022	Lake Louise, Canada	Super-G
2023 13 victories (7 GS, 6 SG)	10 December 2022	Val d'Isère, France	Giant slalom
2023 13 victories (7 GS, 6 SG)	19 December 2022	Alta Badia, Italy	Giant slalom
2023 13 victories (7 GS, 6 SG)	29 December 2022	Bormio, Italy	Super-G
2023 13 victories (7 GS, 6 SG)	7 January 2023	Adelboden, Switzerland	Giant slalom
2023 13 victories (7 GS, 6 SG)	28 January 2023	Cortina d'Ampezzo, Italy	Super-G
2023 13 victories (7 GS, 6 SG)	29 January 2023	Cortina d'Ampezzo, Italy	Super-G
2023 13 victories (7 GS, 6 SG)	5 March 2023	Aspen, United States	Super-G
2023 13 victories (7 GS, 6 SG)	11 March 2023	Kranjska Gora, Slovenia	Giant slalom
2023 13 victories (7 GS, 6 SG)	12 March 2023	Kranjska Gora, Slovenia	Giant slalom
2023 13 victories (7 GS, 6 SG)	16 March 2023	Soldeu, Andorra	Super-G
2023 13 victories (7 GS, 6 SG)	18 March 2023	Soldeu, Andorra	Giant slalom
2024 13 victories (9 GS, 2 SG, 2 DH)	9 December 2023	Val d'Isère, France	Giant slalom
2024 13 victories (9 GS, 2 SG, 2 DH)	17 December 2023	Alta Badia, Italy	Giant slalom
2024 13 victories (9 GS, 2 SG, 2 DH)	18 December 2023	Alta Badia, Italy	Giant slalom
2024 13 victories (9 GS, 2 SG, 2 DH)	29 December 2023	Bormio, Italy	Super-G
2024 13 victories (9 GS, 2 SG, 2 DH)	6 January 2024	Adelboden, Switzerland	Giant slalom
2024 13 victories (9 GS, 2 SG, 2 DH)	11 January 2024	Wengen, Switzerland	Downhill
2024 13 victories (9 GS, 2 SG, 2 DH)	13 January 2024	Wengen, Switzerland	Downhill
2024 13 victories (9 GS, 2 SG, 2 DH)	23 January 2024	Schladming, Austria	Giant slalom
2024 13 victories (9 GS, 2 SG, 2 DH)	28 January 2024	Garmisch-Partenkirchen, Germany	Super-G
2024 13 victories (9 GS, 2 SG, 2 DH)	10 February 2024	Bansko, Bulgaria	Giant slalom
2024 13 victories (9 GS, 2 SG, 2 DH)	24 February 2024	Palisades Tahoe, United States	Giant slalom
2024 13 victories (9 GS, 2 SG, 2 DH)	1 March 2024	Aspen, United States	Giant slalom
2024 13 victories (9 GS, 2 SG, 2 DH)	2 March 2024	Aspen, United States	Giant slalom
2025 8 victories (3 GS, 3 SG, 2 DH)	7 December 2024	Beaver Creek, United States	Super-G
2025 8 victories (3 GS, 3 SG, 2 DH)	14 December 2024	Val d'Isère, France	Giant slalom
2025 8 victories (3 GS, 3 SG, 2 DH)	21 December 2024	Val Gardena, Italy	Downhill
2025 8 victories (3 GS, 3 SG, 2 DH)	22 December 2024	Alta Badia, Italy	Giant slalom
2025 8 victories (3 GS, 3 SG, 2 DH)	12 January 2025	Adelboden, Switzerland	Giant slalom
2025 8 victories (3 GS, 3 SG, 2 DH)	18 January 2025	Wengen, Switzerland	Downhill
2025 8 victories (3 GS, 3 SG, 2 DH)	24 January 2025	Kitzbühel, Austria	Super-G
2025 8 victories (3 GS, 3 SG, 2 DH)	23 February 2025	Crans Montana, Switzerland	Super-G
2026 9 victories (3 GS, 2 SG, 4 DH)	26 October 2025	Sölden, Austria	Giant slalom
2026 9 victories (3 GS, 2 SG, 4 DH)	27 November 2025	Copper Mountain, United States	Super-G
2026 9 victories (3 GS, 2 SG, 4 DH)	4 December 2025	Beaver Creek, United States	Downhill
2026 9 victories (3 GS, 2 SG, 4 DH)	7 December 2025	Beaver Creek, United States	Giant slalom
2026 9 victories (3 GS, 2 SG, 4 DH)	18 December 2025	Val Gardena, Italy	Downhill
2026 9 victories (3 GS, 2 SG, 4 DH)	10 January 2026	Adelboden, Switzerland	Giant slalom
2026 9 victories (3 GS, 2 SG, 4 DH)	17 January 2026	Wengen, Switzerland	Downhill
2026 9 victories (3 GS, 2 SG, 4 DH)	23 January 2026	Kitzbühel, Austria	Super-G
2026 9 victories (3 GS, 2 SG, 4 DH)	28 February 2026	Garmisch-Partenkirchen, Germany	Downhill

== World Championship results ==
Year
Year	Age	Slalom	Giant slalom	Super-G	Downhill	Combined	Team combined	Parallel	Team event
2019	21	—	10	12	—	—	—N/a	—N/a	—
2021	23	—	DNF1	11	4	—	—N/a	11	—
2023	25	—	1	4	1	DSQ SG	—N/a	—	—
2025	27	—	4	1	5	—N/a	—	—N/a	—

== Olympic results ==
Year
Year	Age	Slalom	Giant slalom	Super-G	Downhill	Combined	Team combined	Team event
2022	24	—	1	DNF	7	—	—N/a	—
2026	28	—	2	3	4	—N/a	2	—N/a

== Junior World Championship results ==
Year
Year	Age	Slalom	Giant slalom	Super-G	Downhill	Combined	Team event
2016	18	DNF	1	3	11	DNF	8
2018	20	—	1	1	1	1	1

== Books ==
- Christof Gertsch, Mikael Krogerus: Marco Odermatt – Meine Welt. Wörterseh, 2025, ISBN 978-3-03763-167-6.
