= Stelvio (ski course) =

Italian ski course

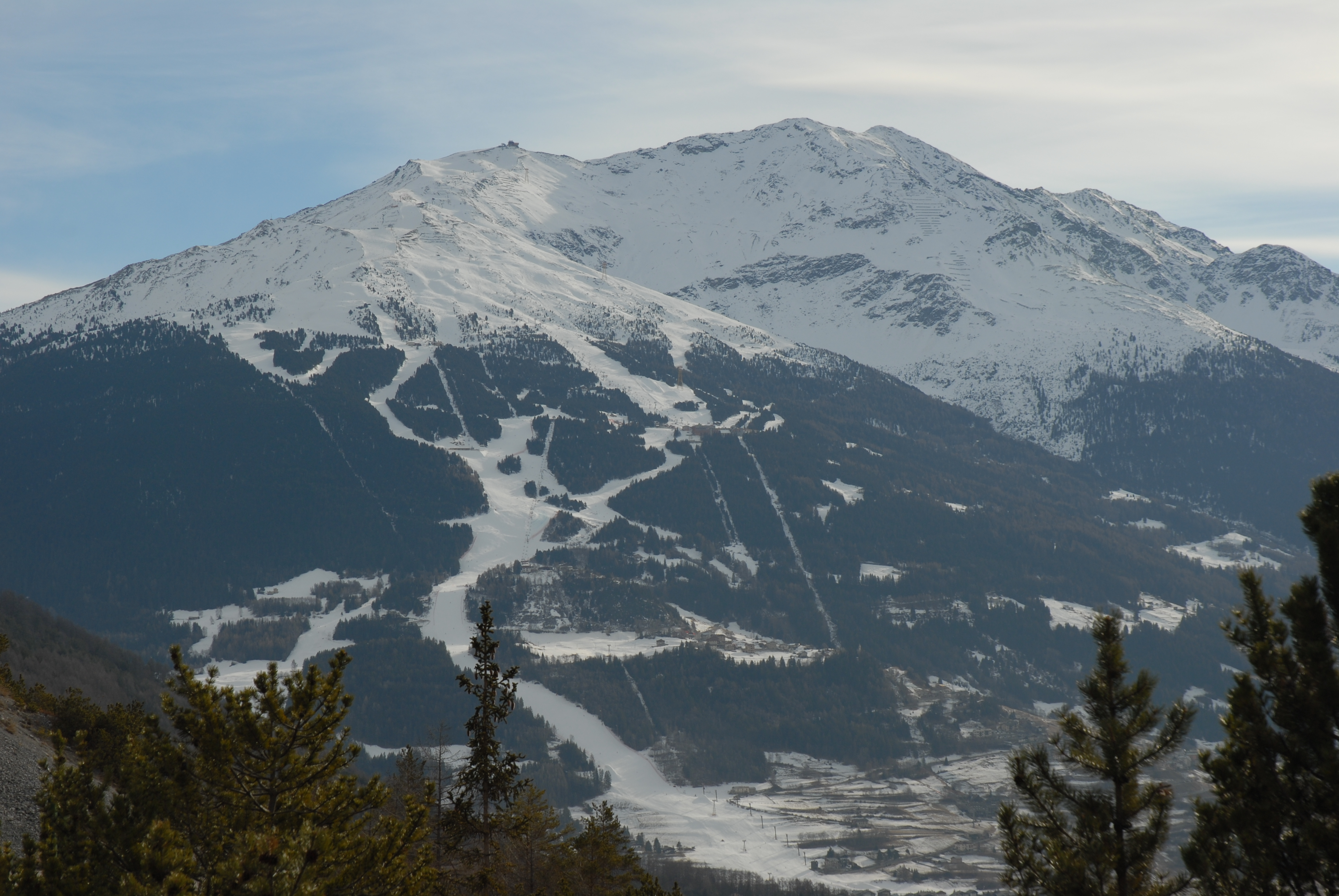
- Interactive map of Stelvio
- Location within Italy Location within Alps Location within Europe
- 46°27′47″N 10°22′36″E
- Location: Bormio, Italy
- Mountain: Vallecetta
- Opened: 1985, 41 years ago
- Architect: Oreste Peccedi (ITA)
- Level: expert

Downhill
- Start: 2,268 m (7,441 ft) (AA)
- Finish: 1,245 m (4,085 ft)
- Vertical drop: 1,023 m (3,356 ft)
- Length: 3.442 km (2.14 mi)
- Max incline: 36.1 degrees (73%)
- Avg incline: 17.7 degrees (30.9%)
- Min incline: 4.6 degrees (8%)

Super-G
- Start: 1,959 m (6,427 ft) (AA)
- Finish: 1,245 m (4,085 ft)
- Vertical drop: 714 m (2,343 ft)
- Length: 2.414 km (1.50 mi)

Stelvio is a World Cup downhill piste in northern Italy was built and opened in 1985. It is located on Vallecetta mountain in Bormio and debuted at the World Championships in 1985.

Stelvio is widely considered one of the, if not the, most difficult and technical downhill courses in the world, with an average incline of 30.9%, steeper than Streif at Kitzbühel. It hosted two World Championships (1985, 2005), and three World Cup finals (1995, 2000, 2008).

This course hosted all five men's events (speed, technical, and team combined) at the 2026 Winter Olympics in Milan–Cortina d'Ampezzo.

Course named after Stelvio Pass, was designed by late Italian architect from Bormio, Oreste Peccedi.

Dominik Paris has seven World Cup downhill wins, a record for a single discipline on one course.

Franjo von Allmen won the 2026 Olympic downhill; the full course was used at 3.442 km (2.14 mi) in length, with a vertical drop of 1,023 m (3,356 ft) from a starting elevation of 2,268 m (7,441 ft). His winning time of 111.61 seconds yielded an average speed of 111.022 km/h (69.0 mph) and an average vertical descent rate of 9.166 m/s (30.1 ft/s).

== Course ==
=== Sections ===
- La Rocca Jump
- Rifugio La Rocca
- Canalino Sertorelli
- Fontana Lunga
- Pian Del'Orso
- Carcentina
- Ciuk
- San Pietro Jump
- Muro San Pietro
- Sali dell'Ermellino
- La Konta
- Bosco Basso
- Feleit

== Winter Olympics ==
=== Men's events ===
Event	Type	Date	Gold	Silver	Bronze
2026	DH	7 February 2026	(Switzerland) Franjo von Allmen	(Italy) Giovanni Franzoni	(Italy) Dominik Paris
2026	SG	11 February 2026	(Switzerland) Franjo von Allmen	(United States) Ryan Cochran-Siegle	(Switzerland) Marco Odermatt
2026	GS	14 February 2026	(Brazil) Lucas Pinheiro Braathen	(Switzerland) Marco Odermatt	(Switzerland) Loïc Meillard
2026	SL	16 February 2026	(Switzerland) Loïc Meillard	(Austria) Fabio Gstrein	(Norway) Henrik Kristoffersen

=== Men's team combined ===
Event	Type	Date	Gold	Silver	Bronze
2026	TKB	9 February 2026	Switzerland II Franjo von Allmen; Tanguy Nef	Austria I Vincent Kriechmayr; Manuel Feller Switzerland I Marco Odermatt; Loïc Meillard	not awarded

== World Championships ==
=== Men's events ===
Event	Type	Date	Gold	Silver	Bronze
1985	DH	3 February 1985	(Switzerland) Pirmin Zurbriggen	(Switzerland) Peter Müller	(United States) Doug Lewis
1985	KB	(DH) 1 February 1985 (SL) 5 February 1985	(Switzerland) Pirmin Zurbriggen	(Austria) Ernst Riedlsperger	(Switzerland) Thomas Bürgler
1985	GS	7 February 1985	(Germany) Markus Wasmeier	(Switzerland) Pirmin Zurbriggen	(Luxembourg) Marc Girardelli
1985	SL	10 February 1985	(Sweden) Jonas Nilsson	(Luxembourg) Marc Girardelli	(Austria) Robert Zoller
2005	SG	29 January 2005	(United States) Bode Miller	(Austria) Michael Walchhofer	(Austria) Benjamin Raich
2005	KB	3 February 2005	(Austria) Benjamin Raich	(Norway) Aksel Lund Svindal	(Italy) Giorgio Rocca
2005	DH	5 February 2005	(United States) Bode Miller	(United States) Daron Rahlves	(Austria) Michael Walchhofer
2005	GS	10 February 2005	(Austria) Hermann Maier	(Austria) Benjamin Raich	(United States) Daron Rahlves
2005	SL	12 February 2005	(Austria) Benjamin Raich	(Austria) Rainer Schönfelder	(Italy) Giorgio Rocca

=== Women's events ===
Combined event 1985 (slalom held on "Stelvio" and downhill on "Cividale" course).

Event	Type	Date	Gold	Silver	Bronze
1985	KB	(DH) 31 January 1985 (SL) 4 February 1985	(Switzerland) Erika Hess	(Austria) Sylvia Eder	(United States) Tamara McKinney
1985	SL	9 February 1985	(France) Perrine Pelen	(France) Christelle Guignard	(Italy) Paoletta Magoni

=== Team event ===
Both Super-G and Slalom runs were held on "Stelvio".

Event	Type	Date	Gold	Silver	Bronze
2005	TE	13 February 2005	Germany Monika Bergmann; Andreas Ertl; Martina Ertl; Florian Eckert; Hilde Gerg; Felix Neureuther	Austria Nicole Hosp; Renate Götschl; Benjamin Raich; Rainer Schönfelder; Michael Walchhofer; Kathrin Zettel	France Pierrick Bourgeat; Ingrid Jacquemod; Carole Montillet; Christel Pascal; Laure Péquegnot; Jean-Pierre Vidal

== World Cup ==
Dominik Paris (ITA)	Stelvio slope	Feleit	Stelvio slope
300x	300x	300x	300x
Won record 7 races in total (and record 6 downhills)	The bottom part and finish	One of the sections	From the distance

=== Men ===
No.	Type	Season	Date	Winner	Second	Third
806	DH	1993/94	29 December 1993	(Austria) Hannes Trinkl	(Luxembourg) Marc Girardelli	(United States) Tommy Moe
857	DH	1994/95	15 March 1995	(France) Luc Alphand	(United States) A. J. Kitt	(Norway) Lasse Kjus
858	SG	1994/95	16 March 1995	(Austria) Richard Kröll	(Italy) Peter Runggaldier	(Italy) Werner Perathoner
859	GS	1994/95	18 March 1995	(Italy) Alberto Tomba	(Austria) Günther Mader	(Austria) Rainer Salzgeber
860	SL	1994/95	19 March 1995	(Norway) Ole Kristian Furuseth	(Austria) Thomas Stangassinger	(France) Yves Dimier
875	DH	1995/96	29 December 1995	(Norway) Lasse Kjus	(Austria) Andreas Schifferer	(Canada) Ed Podivinsky
907	DH	1996/97	29 December 1996	(France) Luc Alphand	(Switzerland) William Besse	(Italy) Kristian Ghedina
943	DH	1997/98	29 December 1997	(Austria) Hermann Maier	(Austria) Andreas Schifferer	(Austria) Werner Franz
944	DH	1997/98	30 December 1997	(Austria) Andreas Schifferer	(Austria) Werner Franz	(Norway) Lasse Kjus
982	DH	1998/99	29 December 1999	(Austria) Hermann Maier	(Austria) Fritz Strobl	(Austria) Stephan Eberharter
1041	DH	1999/00	15 March 2000	(Austria) Hannes Trinkl	(Austria) Hermann Maier	(Austria) Christian Greber
1042	SG	1999/00	16 March 2000	(Austria) Hermann Maier	(Austria) Fritz Strobl	(Austria) Werner Franz (Austria) Andreas Schifferer
1043	GS	1999/00	18 March 2000	(Austria) Benjamin Raich	(Austria) Christian Mayer	(Austria) Heinz Schilchegger
1044	SL	1999/00	19 March 2000	(Norway) Ole Kristian Furuseth	(Austria) Benjamin Raich	(Slovenia) Matjaž Vrhovnik
1058	GS	2000/01	21 December 2000	(Austria) Christoph Gruber	(United States) Erik Schlopy	(Sweden) Fredrik Nyberg
1091	DH	2001/02	28 December 2001	(Austria) Christian Greber	(Austria) Fritz Strobl	(Austria) Stephan Eberharter
1092	DH	2001/02	29 December 2001	(Austria) Fritz Strobl	(Austria) Josef Strobl	(Austria) Stephan Eberharter
1126	DH	2002/03	29 December 2002	(United States) Daron Rahlves	(Austria) Fritz Strobl	(Austria) Hannes Trinkl
1129	DH	2002/03	11 January 2003	(Austria) Stephan Eberharter	(Austria) Michael Walchhofer	(United States) Daron Rahlves
1130	SL	2002/03	12 January 2003	(Croatia) Ivica Kostelić	(United States) Bode Miller	(Norway) Hans Petter Buraas
	DH	2003/04	29 December 2003	cancelled; replaced in Kitzbühel on 22 January 2004		
1204	DH	2004/05	29 December 2004	(Austria) Hans Grugger	(Austria) Michael Walchhofer	(Austria) Fritz Strobl
1240	DH	2005/06	29 December 2005	(United States) Daron Rahlves	(Austria) Fritz Strobl	(Switzerland) Tobias Grünenfelder
1272	DH	2006/07	28 December 2006	(Austria) Michael Walchhofer	(Switzerland) Didier Cuche	(Austria) Mario Scheiber
1273	DH	2006/07	29 December 2006	(Austria) Michael Walchhofer	(Italy) Peter Fill	(Austria) Mario Scheiber
1312	DH	2007/08	29 December 2007	(United States) Bode Miller	(Austria) Andreas Buder	(Canada) Jan Hudec
	DH	2007/08	12 March 2008	warm weather and deteriorated course conditions		
1315	SG	2007/08	13 March 2008	(Austria) Hannes Reichelt	(Switzerland) Didier Défago	(Slovenia) Aleš Gorza
1316	GS	2007/08	14 March 2008	(United States) Ted Ligety	(Austria) Benjamin Raich	(France) Cyprien Richard
1317	SL	2007/08	15 March 2008	(Austria) Reinfried Herbst	(Switzerland) Daniel Albrecht	(Austria) Marcel Hirscher
1351	DH	2008/09	28 December 2008	(Italy) Christof Innerhofer	(Austria) Klaus Kröll	(Austria) Michael Walchhofer
1388	DH	2009/10	29 December 2009	(Slovenia) Andrej Jerman	(Switzerland) Didier Défago	(Austria) Michael Walchhofer
1418	DH	2010/11	29 December 2010	(Austria) Michael Walchhofer	(Switzerland) Silvan Zurbriggen	(Italy) Christof Innerhofer
1456	DH	2011/12	29 December 2011	(Switzerland) Didier Défago	(Switzerland) Patrick Küng	(Austria) Klaus Kröll
1501	DH	2012/13	29 December 2012	(Austria) Hannes Reichelt (Italy) Dominik Paris		(Norway) Aksel Lund Svindal
1534	DH	2013/14	29 December 2013	(Norway) Aksel Lund Svindal	(Austria) Hannes Reichelt	(Canada) Erik Guay
1535	SL	2013/14	6 January 2014	(Germany) Felix Neureuther	(France) Thomas Fanara	(Austria) Marcel Hirscher
1686	DH	2017/18	28 December 2017	(Italy) Dominik Paris	(Norway) Aksel Lund Svindal	(Norway) Kjetil Jansrud
1687	AC	2017/18	29 December 2017	(France) Alexis Pinturault	(Italy) Peter Fill	(Norway) Kjetil Jansrud
1723	DH	2018/19	28 December 2018	(Italy) Dominik Paris	(Italy) Christof Innerhofer	(Switzerland) Beat Feuz
1724	SG	2018/19	29 December 2018	(Italy) Dominik Paris	(Austria) Matthias Mayer	(Norway) Aleksander Aamodt Kilde
1758	DH	2019/20	27 December 2019	(Italy) Dominik Paris	(Switzerland) Beat Feuz	(Austria) Matthias Mayer
1759	DH	2019/20	28 December 2019	(Italy) Dominik Paris	(Switzerland) Urs Kryenbühl	(Switzerland) Beat Feuz
1760	AC	2019/20	29 December 2019	(France) Alexis Pinturault	(Norway) Aleksander Aamodt Kilde	(Switzerland) Loïc Meillard
	DH	2020/21	28 December 2020	cancelled due to bad weather forecast; replaced on 30 December 2020		
1794	SG	2020/21	29 December 2020	(United States) Ryan Cochran-Siegle	(Austria) Vincent Kriechmayr	(Norway) Adrian Smiseth Sejersted
1795	DH	2020/21	30 December 2020	(Austria) Matthias Mayer	(Austria) Vincent Kriechmayr	(Switzerland) Urs Kryenbühl
1832	DH	2021/22	28 December 2021	(Italy) Dominik Paris	(Switzerland) Marco Odermatt	(Switzerland) Niels Hintermann
1833	SG	2021/22	29 December 2021	(Norway) Aleksander Aamodt Kilde	(Austria) Raphael Haaser	(Austria) Vincent Kriechmayr
	SG	2021/22	30 December 2021	rescheduled from Lake Louise, warm weather; replaced in Wengen on 13 January 2022		
1867	DH	2022/23	28 December 2022	(Austria) Vincent Kriechmayr	(Canada) James Crawford	(Norway) Aleksander Aamodt Kilde
1868	SG	2022/23	29 December 2022	(Switzerland) Marco Odermatt	(Austria) Vincent Kriechmayr	(Switzerland) Loic Meillard
1901	DH	2023/24	28 December 2023	(France) Cyprien Sarrazin	(Switzerland) Marco Odermatt	(Canada) Cameron Alexander
1902	SG	2023/24	29 December 2023	(Switzerland) Marco Odermatt	(Austria) Raphael Haaser	(Norway) Aleksander Aamodt Kilde
1940	DH	2024/25	28 December 2024	(Switzerland) Alexis Monney	(Switzerland) Franjo von Allmen	(Canada) Cameron Alexander
1941	SG	2024/25	29 December 2024	(Norway) Fredrik Møller	(Austria) Vincent Kriechmayr	(Switzerland) Alexis Monney

=== Women ===
No.	Type	Season	Date	Winner	Second	Third
798	DH	1994/95	15 March 1995	(United States) Picabo Street	(Russia) Varvara Zelenskaya	(Italy) Barbara Merlin
799	GS	1994/95	18 March 1995	(Slovenia) Špela Pretnar	(Italy) Sabina Panzanini	(Slovenia) Urška Hrovat
800	SG	1994/95	19 March 1995	(Germany) Katja Seizinger	(Austria) Renate Götschl	(France) Florence Masnada
801	SL	1994/95	19 March 1995	(Switzerland) Vreni Schneider	(Sweden) Pernilla Wiberg	(Slovenia) Urška Hrovat
844	SL	1997/98	5 January 1998	(Sweden) Ylva Nowén	(Germany) Hilde Gerg	(Slovenia) Špela Pretnar
845	GS	1997/98	6 January 1998	(Italy) Deborah Compagnoni	(Germany) Martina Ertl	(Austria) Alexandra Meissnitzer
846	GS	1997/98	10 January 1998	(Germany) Martina Ertl	(Germany) Katja Seizinger	(Italy) Deborah Compagnoni
847	SL	1997/98	11 January 1998	(Germany) Hilde Gerg	(United States) Kristina Koznick	(Slovenia) Špela Pretnar
973	DH	1999/00	15 March 2000	(France) Régine Cavagnoud	(Switzerland) Corinne Rey-Bellet	(Austria) Renate Götschl
974	SG	1999/00	16 March 1995	(Austria) Renate Götschl	(Germany) Martina Ertl	(Austria) Brigitte Obermoser
975	SG	1999/00	18 March 1995	(Austria) Brigitte Obermoser	(Austria) Michaela Dorfmeister	(Liechtenstein) Birgit Heeb
976	SL	1999/00	19 March 1995	(United States) Kristina Koznick	(Sweden) Anja Pärson	(Italy) Elisabetta Biavaschi
1061	GS	2002/03	4 January 2003	(Switzerland) Sonja Nef	(Sweden) Anja Pärson	(Austria) Michaela Dorfmeister
1062	SL	2002/03	5 January 2003	(Croatia) Janica Kostelić	(Austria) Elisabeth Görgl	(Sweden) Anja Pärson
	DH	2007/08	12 March 2008	cancelled due to warm weather & deteriorated course conditions		
1249	SG	2007/08	13 March 2008	(Switzerland) Fabienne Suter	(United States) Lindsey Vonn	(Austria) Alexandra Meissnitzer
1250	SL	2007/08	14 March 2008	(Austria) Marlies Schild	(Slovakia) Veronika Zuzulová	(Czech Republic) Šárka Záhrobská
1251	GS	2007/08	15 March 2008	(Austria) Elisabeth Görgl	(Italy) Manuela Mölgg	(Austria) Kathrin Zettel
1438	SL	2013/14	5 January 2014	(United States) Mikaela Shiffrin	(Sweden) Maria Pietilä-Holmner	(France) Nastasia Noens

Not in original World Cup calendar. It replaced other venues.
