= Alpine skiing at the 2026 Winter Olympics =

Alpine skiing at the XXV Olympic Winter Games
- Alpine skiing pictogram
- Venue: Stelvio, Bormio (M); Olimpia delle Tofane, Cortina (W)
- Dates: 7–18 February 2026
- No. of events: 10 (5 men, 5 women)
- Competitors: 306

Alpine skiing at the 2026 Winter Olympics was held between 7 and 18 February 2026.

All five men's events were held in Bormio at the Stelvio ski course; and all five women's events were held in Cortina d'Ampezzo at the Olimpia delle Tofane ski course, both very demanding.

A total of 306 quota spots were distributed to alpine skiing.

Ten events were contested (down from 11 in 2022), split evenly between men and women. The mixed parallel team event was dropped after the 2022 Winter Olympics, while the alpine combined event in each gender was replaced by a team combined event for pairs.

== Map of hosts ==
Bormio (men's events)	Cortina d'Ampezzo (women's events)
Stelvio	Olimpia delle Tofane
North Italy

== Qualification ==
A maximum of 306 quota spots were available to athletes to compete at the games. A maximum of twenty-two athletes could be entered by a National Olympic Committee, with a maximum of eleven men or eleven women.

== Schedule ==
All times are local (UTC+1).

Date	Time	Event
7 February	11:30	Men's downhill
8 February	11:30	Women's downhill
9 February	10:30; 14:00	Men's team combined
10 February	10:30; 14:00	Women's team combined
11 February	11:30	Men's super-G
12 February	11:30	Women's super-G
14 February	10:00; 13:30	Men's giant slalom
15 February	10:00; 13:30	Women's giant slalom
16 February	10:00; 13:30	Men's slalom
18 February	10:00; 13:30	Women's slalom

== Medal summary ==
=== Medal table ===
* Host nation (Italy)

Rank	Nation	Gold	Silver	Bronze	Total
1	Switzerland	4	3	2	9
2	Italy*	2	1	2	5
3	United States	2	1	1	4
4	Austria	1	2	1	4
5	Brazil	1	0	0	1
6	Germany	0	2	0	2
7	Norway	0	1	1	2
7	Sweden	0	1	1	2
9	France	0	1	0	1
Totals (9 entries)		10	12	8	30

=== Medalists ===
==== Men's events ====
Event	Gold		Silver		Bronze	
Downhill	Franjo von Allmen; Switzerland	1:51.61	Giovanni Franzoni; Italy	1:51.81	Dominik Paris; Italy	1:52.11
Super-G	Franjo von Allmen; Switzerland	1:25.32	Ryan Cochran-Siegle; United States	1:25.45	Marco Odermatt; Switzerland	1:25.60
Giant slalom	Lucas Pinheiro Braathen; Brazil	2:25.00	Marco Odermatt; Switzerland	2:25.58	Loïc Meillard; Switzerland	2:26.17
Slalom	Loïc Meillard; Switzerland	1:53.61	Fabio Gstrein; Austria	1:53.96	Henrik Kristoffersen; Norway	1:54.74
Team combined	Switzerland; Franjo von Allmen; Tanguy Nef	2:44.04	Austria; Vincent Kriechmayr; Manuel Feller; Switzerland; Marco Odermatt; Loïc Meillard	2:45.03	Not awarded	

==== Women's events ====
Event	Gold		Silver		Bronze	
Downhill	Breezy Johnson; United States	1:36.10	Emma Aicher; Germany	1:36.14	Sofia Goggia; Italy	1:36.69
Super-G	Federica Brignone; Italy	1:23.41	Romane Miradoli; France	1:23.82	Cornelia Hütter; Austria	1:23.93
Giant slalom	Federica Brignone; Italy	2:13.50	Sara Hector; Sweden; Thea Louise Stjernesund; Norway	2:14.12	Not awarded	
Slalom	Mikaela Shiffrin; United States	1:39.10	Camille Rast; Switzerland	1:40.60	Anna Swenn-Larsson; Sweden	1:40.81
Team combined	Austria; Ariane Rädler; Katharina Huber	2:21.66	Germany; Kira Weidle-Winkelmann; Emma Aicher	2:21.71	United States; Jacqueline Wiles; Paula Moltzan	2:21.91
