= Olympiabakken =

Ski course in Kvitfjell, Norway

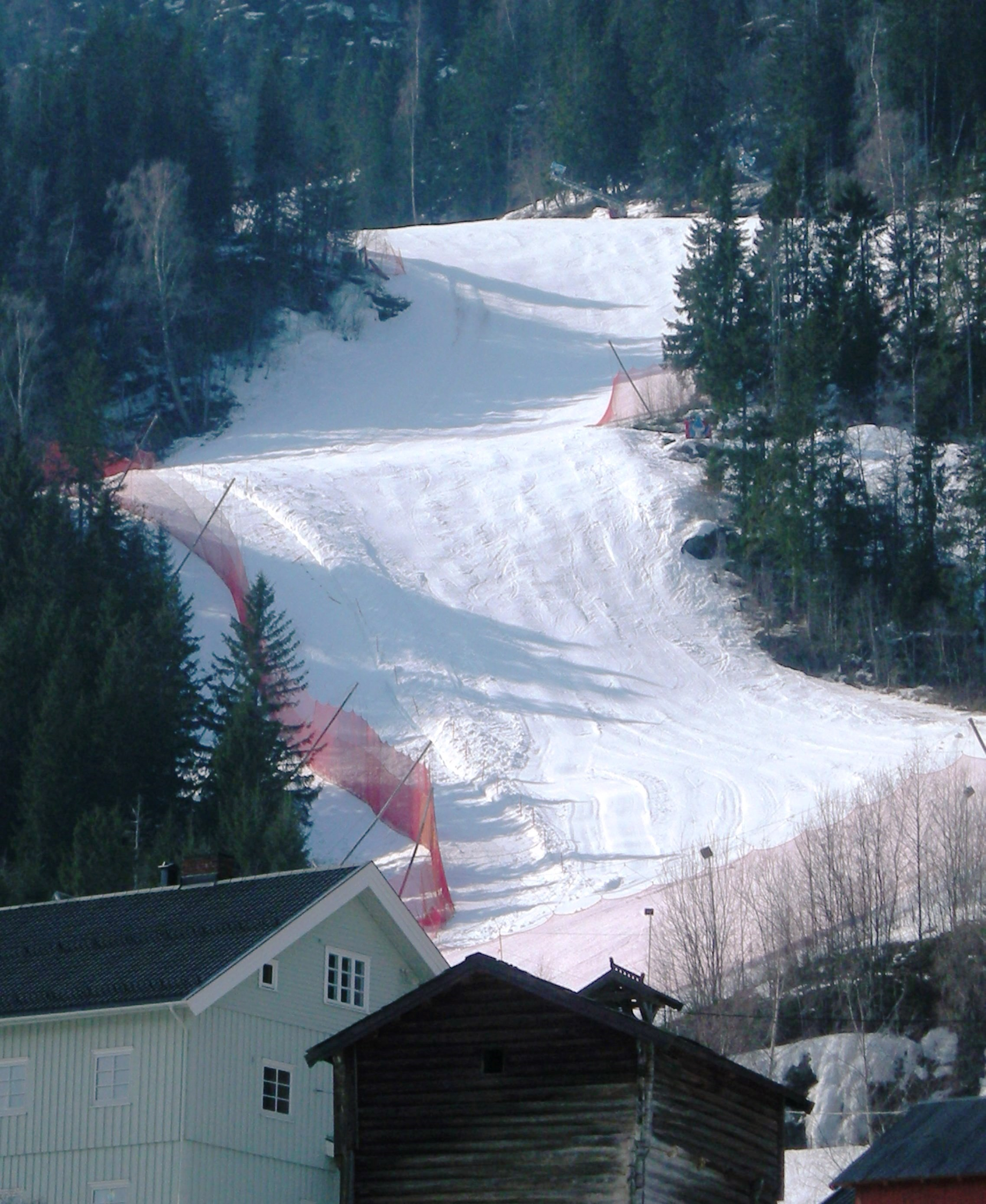
- Interactive map of Olympiabakken
- Location in Norway Kvitfjell (Europe)
- 61°27′43″N 10°7′54″E
- Location: Kvitfjell, Norway
- Opened: 1993; 33 years ago
- Architect: Bernhard Russi
- Member: Club5+

Downhill
- Start: 1,020 m (3,346 ft) (AA)
- Finish: 182 m (597 ft)
- Vertical drop: 838 m (2,749 ft)
- Length: 3,035 m (1.89 mi)
- Max incline: 32.6 degrees (64%)
- Avg incline: 15.4 degrees (27.6%)
- Min incline: 0 degrees (0%)

Super-G
- Start: 832 m (2,730 ft) (AA)
- Finish: 182 m (597 ft)
- Vertical drop: 650 m (2,133 ft)
- Length: 2,451 m (1.52 mi)

Olympiabakken is an Olympic and World Cup downhill ski course in Kvitfjell, Norway, north of Lillehammer; it hosted its first World Cup events in March 1993, and the alpine speed events of the 1994 Winter Olympics the following February.

== Course ==
Olympiabakken was constructed by Swiss downhill course architect Bernhard Russi, the 1972 Olympic gold medalist (and silver medalist in 1976). Built in 1990, the course hosted all speed and half of the combined events at the 1994 Winter Olympics for both men and women.

Since 1995, Kvitfjell has been a regular stop for late season World Cup speed events for men, and occasionally for women. Olympiabakken hosted the speed events of the season finals in March 1996 and 2003; in 2021, the two scheduled men's events were cancelled due to the COVID-19 pandemic.

A favorable downhill course, it is among the least demanding on the men's World Cup circuit.

Dominik Paris won the most recent men's downhill in March 2026; the full course was used at 3.035 km (1.89 mi) in length, with a vertical drop of 838 m (2,749 ft) from a starting elevation of 1,020 m (3,346 ft). His winning time of 105.37 seconds yielded an average speed of 103.692 km/h (64.4 mph) and an average vertical descent rate of 7.953 m/s (26.1 ft/s).

=== Sections ===
- Winterhogget
- Russispranget
- Jansrudhoppet
- S-Svingen
- Bøygen
- Løftet
- Tunnelhoppet

== Olympics ==
=== Men's events ===
Event	Type	Date	Gold	Silver	Bronze
1994	DH	13 February 1994	(United States) Tommy Moe	(Norway) Kjetil André Aamodt	(Canada) Ed Podivinsky
1994	SG	17 February 1994	(Germany) Markus Wasmeier	(United States) Tommy Moe	(Norway) Kjetil André Aamodt
1994	KB	14–25 February 1994	(Norway) Lasse Kjus	(Norway) Kjetil André Aamodt	(Norway) Harald Strand Nilsen

The men's combined slalom was held at Hafjell on Olympialøypa course on 25 February 1994.

=== Women's events ===
Event	Type	Date	Gold	Silver	Bronze
1994	SG	15 February 1994	(United States) Diann Roffe	(Russia) Svetlana Gladysheva	(Italy) Isolde Kostner
1994	DH	19 February 1994	(Germany) Katja Seizinger	(United States) Picabo Street	(Italy) Isolde Kostner
1994	KB	20–21 February 1994	(Sweden) Pernilla Wiberg	(Switzerland) Vreni Schneider	(Slovenia) Alenka Dovžan

The women's combined slalom was held at Hafjell on Olympialøypa course on 21 February 1994.

== World Cup ==
=== Men ===
Season	Date	Event	Winner	Second	Third
1992/93	19 March 1993	DH	(France) Adrien Duvillard	(Italy) Werner Perathoner	(Norway) Atle Skårdal
1992/93	20 March 1993	DH	(Austria) Armin Assinger	(Italy) Werner Perathoner	(Austria) Hannes Trinkl
1992/93	21 March 1993	SG	(Norway) Kjetil André Aamodt	(Switzerland) Daniel Mahrer	(Austria) Dietmar Thöni
1994/95	10 March 1995	SG	(Italy) Werner Perathoner	(Italy) Kristian Ghedina	(United States) Kyle Rasmussen
1994/95	11 March 1995	DH	(United States) Kyle Rasmussen	(Italy) Kristian Ghedina	(Austria) Patrick Ortlieb
1995/96	6 March 1996	DH	(Norway) Lasse Kjus	(Austria) Günther Mader	(Italy) Kristian Ghedina
1995/96	7 March 1996	SG	(Norway) Kjetil André Aamodt	(France) Luc Alphand	(Norway) Lasse Kjus
1996/97	2 March 1997	DH	(Norway) Lasse Kjus	(Italy) Pietro Vitalini	(Canada) Ed Podivinsky
1996/97	3 March 1997	SG	(Austria) Josef Strobl	(Austria) Andreas Schifferer	(Norway) Lasse Kjus
1997/98	7 March 1998	DH	(France) Nicolas Burtin	(Italy) Werner Perathoner	(Norway) Lasse Kjus (Austria) Josef Strobl
1997/98	8 March 1998	SG	(Austria) Hans Knauß	(Sweden) Patrik Järbyn	(Switzerland) Didier Cuche
1998/99	5 March 1999	DH	(Austria) Andreas Schifferer	(Austria) Stephan Eberharter	(Norway) Kjetil André Aamodt
1998/99	6 March 1999	DH	(Austria) Andreas Schifferer	(Norway) Lasse Kjus	(Austria) Stephan Eberharter
1998/99	7 March 1999	SG	(Austria) Hermann Maier	(Austria) Stephan Eberharter	(Austria) Andreas Schifferer
1999/00	3 March 2000	DH	(United States) Daron Rahlves	(Switzerland) Didier Cuche	(Austria) Hermann Maier
1999/00	4 March 2000	DH	(United States) Daron Rahlves	(Italy) Kristian Ghedina	(Germany) Max Rauffer
1999/00	5 March 2000	SG	(Italy) Kristian Ghedina	(Austria) Hermann Maier	(Austria) Andreas Schifferer
2000/01	2 March 2001	DH	(Austria) Hermann Maier	(Germany) Florian Eckert	(Norway) Lasse Kjus
2000/01	3 March 2001	DH	(Austria) Stephan Eberharter	(Germany) Florian Eckert	(Austria) Fritz Strobl
2000/01	4 March 2001	SG	(Austria) Hermann Maier	(Austria) Hannes Trinkl	(Austria) Stephan Eberharter
2001/02	2 March 2002	DH	(Austria) Hannes Trinkl	(France) Claude Crétier	(Switzerland) Franco Cavegn (Italy) Kristian Ghedina
2001/02	3 March 2002	SG	(Italy) Alessandro Fattori	(Switzerland) Didier Défago	(Austria) Stephan Eberharter
2002/03	12 March 2003	DH	(France) Antoine Dénériaz	(Austria) Stephan Eberharter	(Italy) Daron Rahlves
2002/03	13 March 2003	SG	(Austria) Stephan Eberharter	(Norway) Lasse Kjus	(Austria) Hannes Reichelt
2003/04	6 March 2004	DH	(Austria) Stephan Eberharter	(Austria) Fritz Strobl	(France) Antoine Dénériaz
2003/04	7 March 2004	SG	(United States) Daron Rahlves	(Norway) Bjarne Solbakken	(Austria) Hermann Maier
2004/05	5 March 2005	DH	(Austria) Hermann Maier	(Austria) Mario Scheiber	(Switzerland) Ambrosi Hoffmann
2004/05	6 March 2005	SG	(Austria) Hermann Maier	(Switzerland) Didier Défago	(United States) Daron Rahlves
2006/07	9 March 2007	SC	(Austria) Benjamin Raich	(Switzerland) Silvan Zurbriggen	(Norway) Aksel Lund Svindal
2006/07	9 March 2007	DH	recheduled to 10 March; due to super combined replacement		
2006/07	10 March 2007	DH	(Switzerland) Didier Cuche	(Canada) Erik Guay	(Liechtenstein) Marco Büchel
2006/07	10 March 2007	SG	recheduled to 11 March; due to super combined replacement		
2006/07	11 March 2007	SG	(Austria) Hans Grugger	(Austria) Mario Scheiber	(Switzerland) Didier Cuche
2007/08	29 February 2008	DH	(Italy) Werner Heel	(United States) Bode Miller	(Austria) Klaus Kröll
2007/08	1 March 2008	DH	(United States) Bode Miller	(Switzerland) Didier Cuche	(Italy) Werner Heel
2007/08	2 March 2008	SG	(Austria) Georg Streitberger	(United States) Bode Miller	(Switzerland) Didier Cuche
2008/09	6 March 2009	DH	(Canada) Manuel Osborne-Paradis	(Austria) Michael Walchhofer	(Norway) Aksel Lund Svindal
2008/09	7 March 2009	DH	(Austria) Klaus Kröll	(Austria) Michael Walchhofer	(Canada) Manuel Osborne-Paradis
2009/10	6 March 2010	DH	(Switzerland) Didier Cuche	(Norway) Aksel Lund Svindal	(Austria) Klaus Kröll
2009/10	7 March 2010	SG	(Canada) Erik Guay	(Austria) Hannes Reichelt	(Switzerland) Tobias Grünenfelder (Norway) Aksel Lund Svindal
2010/11	11 March 2011	DH	(Switzerland) Beat Feuz	(Canada) Erik Guay	(Austria) Michael Walchhofer
2010/11	12 March 2011	DH	(Austria) Michael Walchhofer	(Austria) Klaus Kröll	(Switzerland) Beat Feuz
2010/11	13 March 2011	SG	(Switzerland) Didier Cuche	(Austria) Klaus Kröll	(Austria) Joachim Puchner
2011/12	2 March 2012	SG	(Switzerland) Beat Feuz (Austria) Klaus Kröll		(Norway) Kjetil Jansrud
2011/12	3 March 2012	DH	(Austria) Klaus Kröll	(Norway) Kjetil Jansrud	(Norway) Aksel Lund Svindal
2011/12	4 March 2012	SG	(Norway) Kjetil Jansrud	(Norway) Aksel Lund Svindal	(Switzerland) Beat Feuz
2012/13	2 March 2013	DH	(France) Adrien Théaux	(Norway) Aksel Lund Svindal	(Austria) Klaus Kröll
2012/13	3 March 2013	SG	(Norway) Aksel Lund Svindal	(Austria) Georg Streitberger	(Italy) Werner Heel
2013/14	28 February 2014	DH	(Norway) Kjetil Jansrud (Austria) Georg Streitberger		(United States) Travis Ganong
2013/14	1 March 2014	DH	(Canada) Erik Guay	(France) Johan Clarey	(Austria) Matthias Mayer
2013/14	2 March 2014	SG	(Norway) Kjetil Jansrud	(Switzerland) Patrick Küng	(Austria) Matthias Mayer
2014/15	7 March 2015	DH	(Austria) Hannes Reichelt	(Canada) Manuel Osborne-Paradis	(Italy) Werner Heel
2014/15	8 March 2015	SG	(Norway) Kjetil Jansrud	(Austria) Vincent Kriechmayr	(Canada) Dustin Cook
2015/16	12 March 2016	DH	(Italy) Dominik Paris	(France) Valentin Giraud Moine	(United States) Steven Nyman
2015/16	13 March 2016	SG	(Norway) Kjetil Jansrud	(Austria) Vincent Kriechmayr	(Italy) Dominik Paris
2016/17	24 February 2017	DH	(Slovenia) Boštjan Kline	(Austria) Matthias Mayer	(Norway) Kjetil Jansrud
2016/17	25 February 2017	DH	(Norway) Kjetil Jansrud	(Italy) Peter Fill	(Switzerland) Beat Feuz
2016/17	26 February 2017	SG	(Italy) Peter Fill	(Austria) Hannes Reichelt	(Canada) Erik Guay
2017/18	10 March 2018	DH	(Germany) Thomas Dreßen	(Switzerland) Beat Feuz	(Norway) Aksel Lund Svindal
2017/18	11 March 2018	SG	(Norway) Kjetil Jansrud	(Switzerland) Beat Feuz	(France) Brice Roger
2018/19	2 March 2019	DH	(Italy) Dominik Paris	(Switzerland) Beat Feuz	(Austria) Matthias Mayer
2018/19	3 March 2019	SG	(Italy) Dominik Paris	(Norway) Kjetil Jansrud	(Switzerland) Beat Feuz
2019/20	7 March 2020	DH	(Austria) Matthias Mayer	(Norway) Aleksander Aamodt Kilde	(Switzerland) Carlo Janka
2019/20	8 March 2020	SG	cancelled due to rain, wind and fog		
2020/21	6 March 2021	DH	cancelled due to COVID-19 pandemic		
2020/21	7 March 2021	SG	cancelled due to COVID-19 pandemic		
2021/22	4 March 2022	DH	(Canada) Cameron Alexander (Switzerland) Niels Hintermann		(Austria) Matthias Mayer
2021/22	5 March 2022	DH	(Italy) Dominik Paris	(Norway) Aleksander Aamodt Kilde	(Switzerland) Beat Feuz (Switzerland) Niels Hintermann
2021/22	6 March 2022	SG	(Norway) Aleksander Aamodt Kilde	(Canada) James Crawford	(Austria) Matthias Mayer
2023/24	17 February 2024	DH	(Switzerland) Niels Hintermann	(Austria) Vincent Kriechmayr	(Canada) Cameron Alexander
2023/24	18 February 2024	SG	(Austria) Vincent Kriechmayr	(Canada) Jeffrey Read	(Switzerland) Marco Odermatt (Italy) Dominik Paris
2024/25	7 March 2025	DH	(Italy) Dominik Paris	(Switzerland) Marco Odermatt	(Switzerland) Stefan Rogentin
2024/25	8 March 2025	DH	(Switzerland) Franjo von Allmen	(Switzerland) Marco Odermatt	(Switzerland) Stefan Rogentin
2024/25	9 March 2025	SG	(Italy) Dominik Paris	(Canada) James Crawford	(Slovenia) Miha Hrobat
2025/26	21 March 2026	DH	(Italy) Dominik Paris	(Switzerland) Franjo von Allmen	(Austria) Vincent Kriechmayr
2025/26	22 March 2026	SG	(Italy) Dominik Paris	(Austria) Vincent Kriechmayr	(Austria) Raphael Haaser

Replacement for Aspen (1993), Wengen (2001), Val d'Isere (2007, 2008), Beaver Creek (2011), Ga-Pa (2012, 2014, 2025), Lake Louise (2022).

=== Women ===
Season	Date	Event	Winner	Second	Third
1992/93	13 March 1993	DH	(Canada) Kate Pace	(United States) Picabo Street	(France) Carole Montillet
1992/93	(Note: Women's world cup classic combined in 1993, dowhnill was held in Kvitfjell and slalom in Hafjell)14 March 1993	KB	(Italy) Bibiana Perez	(Italy) Morena Gallizio	(Germany) Miriam Vogt
1995/96	6 March 1996	DH	(Switzerland) Heidi Zurbriggen	(Italy) Isolde Kostner	(Germany) Katja Seizinger
1995/96	7 March 1996	SG	(Norway) Ingeborg Helen Marken	(Germany) Katja Seizinger	(Italy) Isolde Kostner
2002/03	12 March 2003	DH	(Austria) Renate Götschl	(France) Ingrid Jacquemod	(United States) Kirsten Clark
2002/03	13 March 2003	SG	(Italy) Karen Putzer	(Germany) Martina Ertl (Austria) Alexandra Meissnitzer	
2022/23	3 March 2023	SG	(Austria) Cornelia Hütter	(Italy) Elena Curtoni	(Switzerland) Lara Gut
2022/23	4 March 2023	DH	(Norway) Kajsa Vickhoff Lie	(Italy) Sofia Goggia	(Switzerland) Corinne Suter
2022/23	5 March 2023	SG	(Austria) Nina Ortlieb	(Austria) Stephanie Venier	(Austria) Franziska Gritsch
2023/24	2 March 2024	DH	(Switzerland) Lara Gut	(Austria) Cornelia Hütter	(Austria) Mirjam Puchner
2023/24	3 March 2024	SG	(Italy) Federica Brignone	(Switzerland) Lara Gut	(Czech Republic) Ester Ledecká
2024/25	8 February 2025	DH	(Austria) Cornelia Hütter	(Germany) Emma Aicher	(United States) Breezy Johnson
2024/25	1 March 2025	DH	(Germany) Emma Aicher	(United States) Lauren Macuga	(Austria) Cornelia Hütter
2024/25	2 March 2025	SG	(Italy) Federica Brignone	(Switzerland) Lara Gut	(Italy) Sofia Goggia
2025/26	21 March 2026	DH	(Italy) Laura Pirovano	(United States) Breezy Johnson	(Germany) Kira Weidle-Winkelmann
2025/26	22 March 2026	SG	(Italy) Sofia Goggia	(Switzerland) Corinne Suter	(Germany) Kira Weidle-Winkelmann

== Club5+ ==
In 1986, elite Club5 was originally founded by prestigious classic downhill organizers: Kitzbühel, Wengen, Garmisch, Val d’Isère and Val Gardena/Gröden, with goal to bring alpine ski sport on the highest levels possible.

Later over the years other classic long-term organizers joined the now named Club5+: Alta Badia, Cortina, Kranjska Gora, Maribor, Lake Louise, Schladming, Adelboden, Kvitfjell, St.Moritz and Åre.
