= Linus Straßer =

German alpine skier (born 1992)

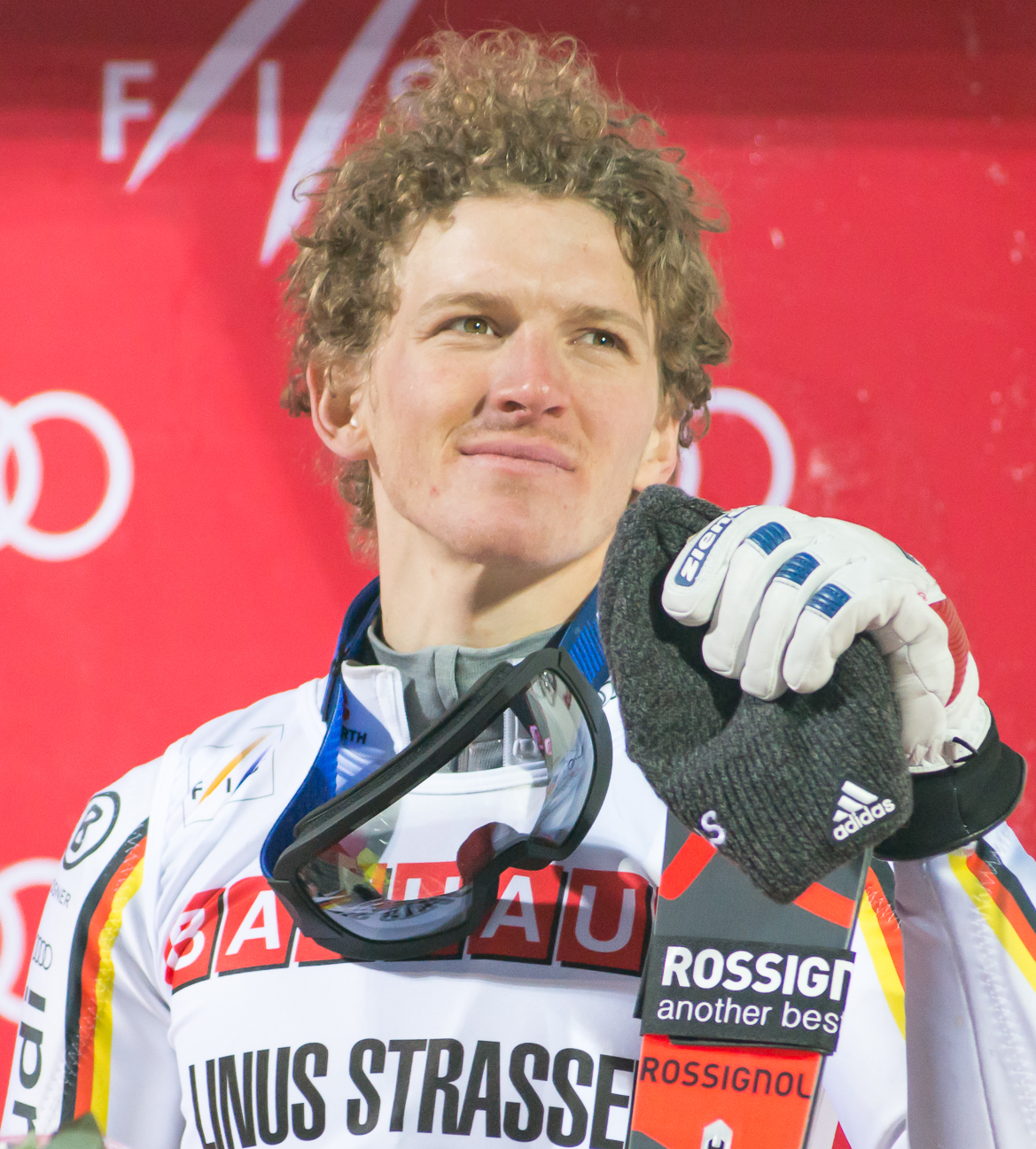
- Straßer in 2018

Personal information
- Born: 6 November 1992 (age 33) Munich, Germany
- Height: 1.83 m (6 ft 0 in)

Skiing career
- Country: Germany
- Sport: Alpine skiing
- Club: TSV 1860 München
- Disciplines: Slalom, Parallel slalom
- World Cup debut: 27 October 2013 (age 20)

Olympics
- Teams: 3 – (2018, 2022, 2026)
- Medals: 1 (0 gold)

World Championships
- Teams: 6 – (2015–2025)
- Medals: 2 (0 gold)

World Cup
- Seasons: 13 – (2014–2026)
- Wins: 5 – (4 SL, 1 PSL)
- Podiums: 16 – (13 SL, 3 PSL)
- Overall titles: 0 – (9th in 2024)
- Discipline titles: 0 – (2nd in SL, 2024)
Medal record
Men's alpine skiing
Representing Germany
World Cup race podiums
Event	1st	2nd	3rd
Slalom	4	2	7
Parallel	1	0	2
Total	5	2	9
Olympic Games
Silver medal – second place	2022 Beijing	Team event
World Championships
Bronze medal – third place	2021 Cortina d’Ampezzo	Team event
Bronze medal – third place	2025 Saalbach	Slalom

Linus Straßer (born 6 November 1992) is a German World Cup alpine ski racer who specializes in the slalom discipline. He won a team silver medal at the 2022 Winter Olympics.

Straßer's first qualification for a World Cup second run came in a giant slalom at Beaver Creek in December 2014, but he failed to finish. Straßer has competed in five World Championships; in his first in 2015 at Beaver Creek, he was in tenth in the slalom. His first World Cup podium was a victory in a parallel slalom race in Stockholm in January 2017.

== World cup results ==
=== Season standings ===
Season
Season	Age	Overall	Slalom	Giant slalom	Super-G	Downhill	Combined	Parallel
2015	22	64	21	—	—	—	—	—N/a
2016	23	114	36	—	—	—	—	—N/a
2017	24	40	14	—	—	—	—	—N/a
2018	25	36	13	51	—	—	—	—N/a
2019	26	107	48	—	—	—	17	—N/a
2020	27	43	12	—	—	—	—	12
2021	28	18	8	—	—	—	—N/a	29
2022	29	21	5	—	—	—	—N/a	12
2023	30	25	7	—	—	—	—N/a	—N/a
2024	31	9	2	53	—	—	—N/a	—N/a
2025	32	25	10	49	—	—	—N/a	—N/a
2026	33	31	11	—	—	—	—N/a	—N/a

=== Race podiums ===
- 5 wins – (4 SL, 1 PSL)
- 16 podiums – (13 SL, 3 PSL); 45 top tens

Season
Season	Date	Location	Discipline	Place
2017	31 January 2017	Stockholm, Sweden	Parallel slalom	1st
2018	1 January 2018	Oslo, Norway	Parallel slalom	3rd
2018	30 January 2018	Stockholm, Sweden	Parallel slalom	3rd
2021	6 January 2021	Zagreb, Croatia	Slalom	1st
2021	10 January 2021	Adelboden, Switzerland	Slalom	2nd
2022	9 January 2022	Adelboden, Switzerland	Slalom	3rd
2022	25 January 2022	Schladming, Austria	Slalom	1st
2022	27 February 2022	Garmisch-Partenkirchen, Germany	Slalom	3rd
2023	22 December 2022	Madonna di Campiglio, Italy	Slalom	3rd
2023	8 January 2023	Adelboden, Switzerland	Slalom	3rd
2024	21 January 2024	Kitzbühel, Austria	Slalom	1st
2024	24 January 2024	Schladming, Austria	Slalom	1st
2024	25 February 2024	Palisades Tahoe, United States	Slalom	3rd
2024	3 March 2024	Aspen, United States	Slalom	2nd
2024	17 March 2024	Saalbach, Austria	Slalom	3rd
2026	25 January 2026	Kitzbühel, Austria	Slalom	3rd

== World Championships results ==
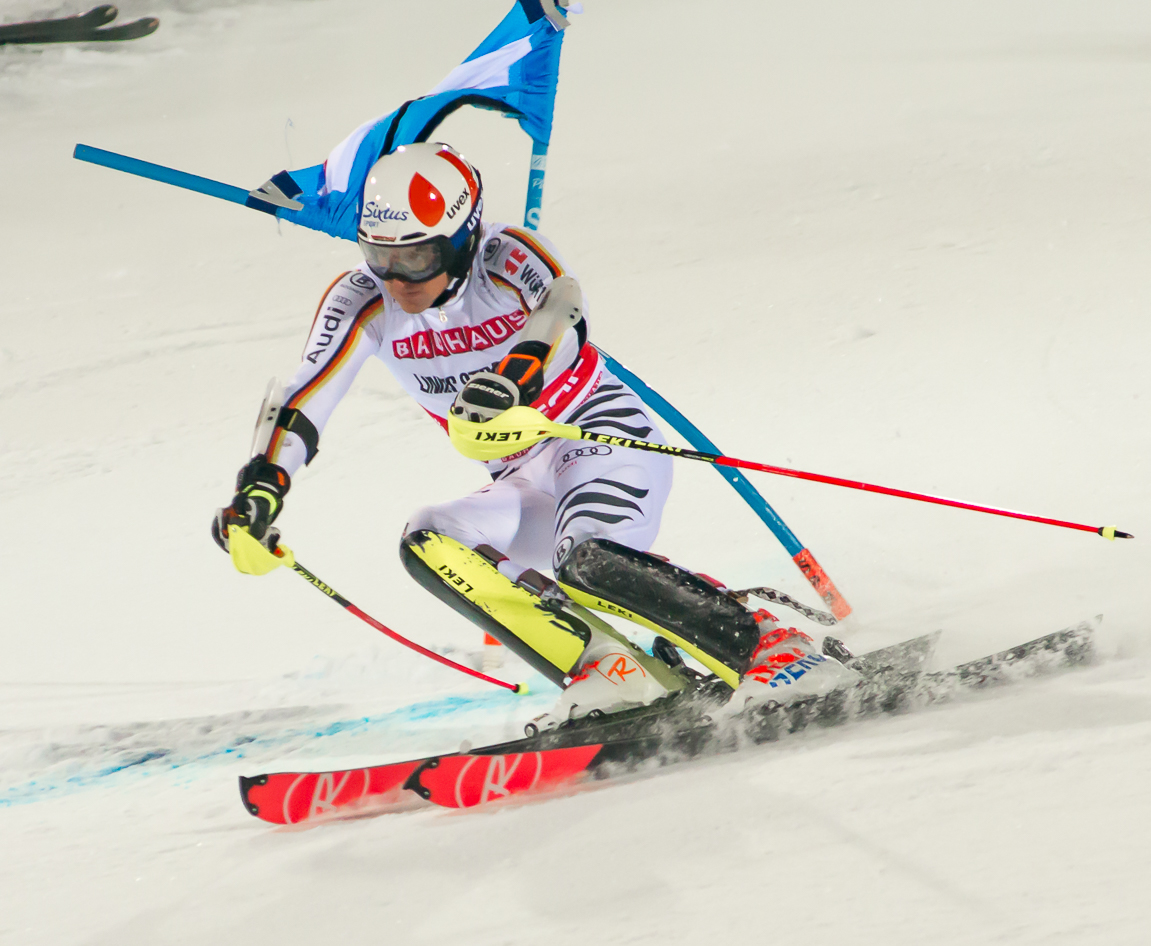
Strasser in Hammarbybacken World Cup 2018

Year
Year	Age	Slalom	Giant slalom	Super-G	Downhill	Combined	Team combined	Parallel	Team event
2015	22	10	DNS2	—	—	—	—N/a	—N/a	—N/a
2017	24	20	12	—	—	—	—N/a	—N/a	—N/a
2019	26	28	—	—	37	—	—N/a	—N/a	4
2021	28	15	—	—	—	—	—N/a	7	3
2023	30	9	—	—	—	—	—N/a	14	6
2025	32	3	—	—	—	—N/a	8	—N/a	5

== Olympic results ==
Year
Year	Age	Slalom	Giant slalom	Super-G	Downhill	Combined	Team combined	Team event
2018	25	DNF1	22	—	—	DNF2	—N/a	5
2022	29	7	DNF1	—	—	—	—N/a	2
2026	33	9	—	—	—	—N/a	10	—N/a
