= Cyprien Sarrazin =

French alpine skier (born 1994)

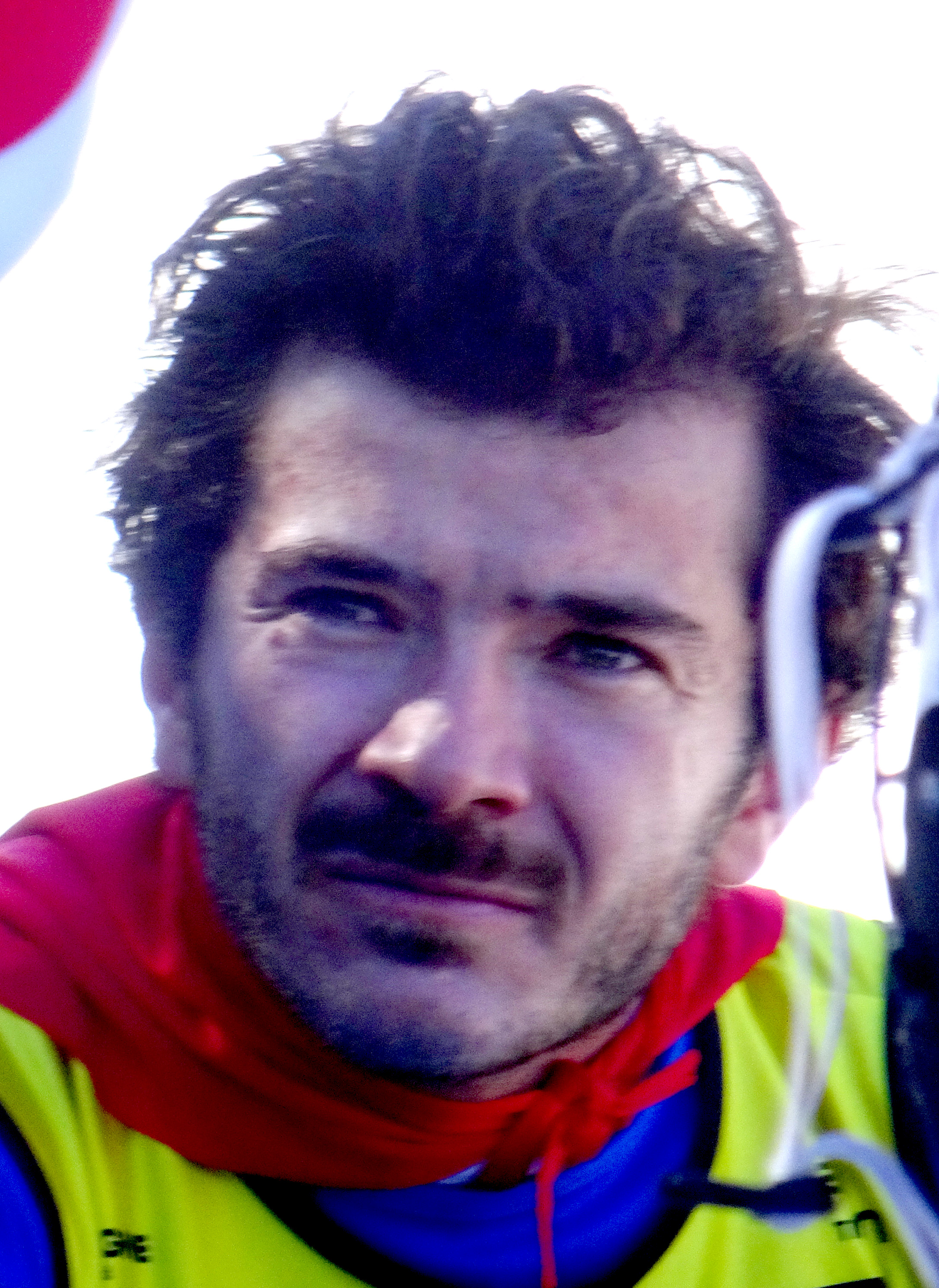
- Sarrazin in 2019

Personal information
- Born: 13 October 1994 (age 32) Gap, Hautes-Alpes, France

Skiing career
- Sport: Alpine skiing
- Club: E.C. Champsaur
- Disciplines: Downhill, Super-G, Giant slalom
- World Cup debut: 19 February 2016 (age 21)

Olympics
- Teams: 1 – (2022)
- Medals: 0

World Championships
- Teams: 1 – (2023)
- Medals: 0

World Cup
- Seasons: 8 – (2016–2017, 2019–2024)
- Wins: 5 – (3 DH, 1 SG, 1 PG)
- Podiums: 9 – (5 DH, 2 SG, 1 GS, 1 PG)
- Overall titles: 0 – (5th in 2024)
- Discipline titles: 0 – (2nd in DH), 2024)

Cyprien Sarrazin (born 13 October 1994) is a French World Cup alpine ski racer who races in giant slalom, super-G and downhill.

Born in Gap, Hautes-Alpes, Sarrazin made his World Cup debut at age 21 in February 2016. Initially a giant slalom specialist, in only his seventh World Cup race he won the parallel giant slalom in Alta Badia in the 2016–17 season, and he scored a 2nd place in the same location during the 2019–20 season.

Sarrazin later turned to the speed disciplines with breakthrough success coming in the 2023–24 season, winning in Bormio and twice in Kitzbühel in the downhill discipline, and a Super-G in Wengen.

== World Cup results ==
=== Season standings ===
Season	Age	Overall	Slalom	Giant slalom	Super-G	Downhill	Combined	Parallel
2016	21	157	—	—	—	—	47	—N/a
2017	22	51	—	17	—	—	—	—N/a
2018	23	No World Cup points						
2019	24	No World Cup points						
2020	25	64	—	16	—	—	—	39
2021	26	118	—	44	—	—	—N/a	27
2022	27	92	—	28	45	—	—N/a	15
2023	28	53	—	54	23	25	—N/a	—N/a
2024	29	5	—	—	6	2	—N/a	—N/a
2025	30	22	—	46	8	19	—N/a	—N/a

Standings through 30 December 2024

=== Race podiums ===
- 5 wins – (3 DH, 1 SG, 1 PG)
- 9 podiums – (5 DH, 2 SG, 1 GS, 1 PG); 18 top tens

Season	Date	Location	Discipline	Place
2017	19 Dec 2016	Alta Badia, Italy	Parallel-G	1st
2020	22 Dec 2019	Alta Badia, Italy	Giant slalom	2nd
2024	28 Dec 2023	Bormio, Italy	Downhill	1st
2024	11 Jan 2024	Wengen, Switzerland	Downhill	2nd
2024	12 Jan 2024	Wengen, Switzerland	Super-G	1st
2024	13 Jan 2024	Wengen, Switzerland	Downhill	2nd
2024	19 Jan 2024	Kitzbühel, Austria	Downhill	1st
2024	20 Jan 2024	Kitzbühel, Austria	Downhill	1st
2025	7 Dec 2024	(United States) Beaver Creek, USA	Super-G	2nd

== World Championship results ==
Year	Age	Slalom	Giant slalom	Super-G	Downhill	Combined
2023	28	—	—	—	—	DNS SG

== Olympic results ==
Year	Age	Slalom	Giant slalom	Super-G	Downhill	Combined
2022	27	—	DNF1	—	—	—
