= Florian Schieder =

Italian alpine skier (born 1995)

Personal information
- Born: 26 December 1995 (age 30) Kastelruth, South Tyrol, Italy

Skiing career
- Country: Italy
- Sport: Alpine skiing
- Club: C.S. Carabinieri
- Disciplines: Downhill, Super-G
- World Cup debut: 27 January 2017 (age 21)

Olympics
- Teams: 1 – (2026)
- Medals: 0

World Championships
- Teams: 3 – (2021, 2023, 2025)
- Medals: 0

World Cup
- Seasons: 9 – (2017–2021, 2023–2026)
- Wins: 0
- Podiums: 3 – (3 DH)
- Overall titles: 0 – (24th in 2026)
- Discipline titles: 0 – (6th in DH, 2026)

Florian Schieder (born 30 March 1995) is an Italian World Cup alpine ski racer and specializes in the speed events of downhill and super-G.

== World Cup results ==
=== Season standings ===
Season
Season	Age	Overall	Slalom	Giant slalom	Super-G	Downhill	Combined
2018	22	151	—	—	47	—	—
2019	23	no World Cup points earned					
2020	24	137	—	—	54	—	39
2021	25	55	—	—	24	30	—N/a
2022	26	injured, did not compete					—N/a
2023	27	34	—	—	50	10	—N/a
2024	28	43	—	—	59	11	—N/a
2025	29	58	—	—	50	16	—N/a
2026	30	24	—	—	39	6	—N/a

=== Race podiums ===
- 0 wins
- 3 podiums – (3 DH), 13 top tens (13 DH)

Season
Season	Date	Location	Discipline	Place
2023	20 January 2023	Kitzbühel, Austria	Downhill	2nd
2024	19 January 2024	Kitzbühel, Austria	Downhill	2nd
2026	20 December 2025	Val Gardena, Italy	Downhill	3rd

== World Championship results ==
Year
Year	Age	Slalom	Giant slalom	Super-G	Downhill	Combined	Team combined
2021	25	—	—	—	DNF	—	—N/a
2023	27	—	—	—	7	—	—N/a
2025	29	—	—	—	16	—N/a	6

== Olympic results ==
Year
Year	Age	Slalom	Giant slalom	Super-G	Downhill	Team combined
2026	30	—	—	—	17	DNF DH
