= Arnaud Boisset =

Swiss alpine skier (born 1998)

Personal information
- Born: 8 May 1998 (age 28) Martigny, Valais, Switzerland
- Height: 1.85 m (6 ft 1 in)
- Website: arnaudboisset.com

Skiing career
- Country: Switzerland
- Sport: Alpine skiing
- Club: SAS Lausanne
- Disciplines: Downhill, super-G
- World Cup debut: 15 December 2023 (age 25)

Olympics
- Teams: 0

World Championships
- Teams: 0

World Cup
- Seasons: 3 – (2024–2026)
- Podiums: 1 – (1 SG)

Arnaud Boisset (born 8 May 1998) is a Swiss World Cup alpine ski racer, specializing in the speed events of downhill and super-G.

== Career ==
Boisset born in Martigny, in the Swiss canton of Valais. He was trained through the Ski‑Valais and later the Centre National de Performance Ouest (NLZ) high‑performance structures of Swiss skiing. At age 17 he earned a place in the Cadre C of Swiss‑Ski, a key step toward access to the international circuit.

Boisset made his World Cup debut in November 2023, who achieved top 10 finishes in three events, and reached his first podium in March 2024 – a third place in super-G – during the Season Final competition in Saalbach, Austria, becoming one of the few skiers to achieve this result in his first season.

== World Cup results ==
=== Season standings ===
Season
Season	Age	Overall	Slalom	Giant slalom	Super-G	Downhill
2024	25	35	—	—	11	33
2025	26	149	—	—	56	—
2026	27	120	—	—	—	47

Standings through 22 March 2026

=== Top-ten results ===
- 1 podiums, 4 top tens

Season
Season	Date	Location	Discipline	Place
2024	19 January 2024	Kitzbühel, Austria	Downhill	9th
2024	28 January 2024	Garmisch, Germany	Super-G	7th
2024	18 February 2024	Kvitfjell, Norway	Super-G	8th
2024	22 March 2024	Saalbach, Austria	Super-G	3rd
