= 2023–24 FIS Alpine Ski World Cup =

International sports competition

Discipline	Men	Women
Overall	(Switzerland) Marco Odermatt (3)	(Switzerland) Lara Gut-Behrami (2)
Downhill	(Switzerland) Marco Odermatt (1)	(Austria) Cornelia Hütter (1)
Super-G	(Switzerland) Marco Odermatt (2)	(Switzerland) Lara Gut-Behrami (5)
Giant slalom	(Switzerland) Marco Odermatt (3)	(Switzerland) Lara Gut-Behrami (1)
Slalom	(Austria) Manuel Feller (1)	(United States) Mikaela Shiffrin (8)
Nations Cup	Switzerland (10)	Austria (35)
- Nations Cup Overall: Switzerland (11)

Competition
Edition	58th	58th
Locations	21	22
Individual	35	39
Cancelled	13	8
Rescheduled	4	2

Overall champions

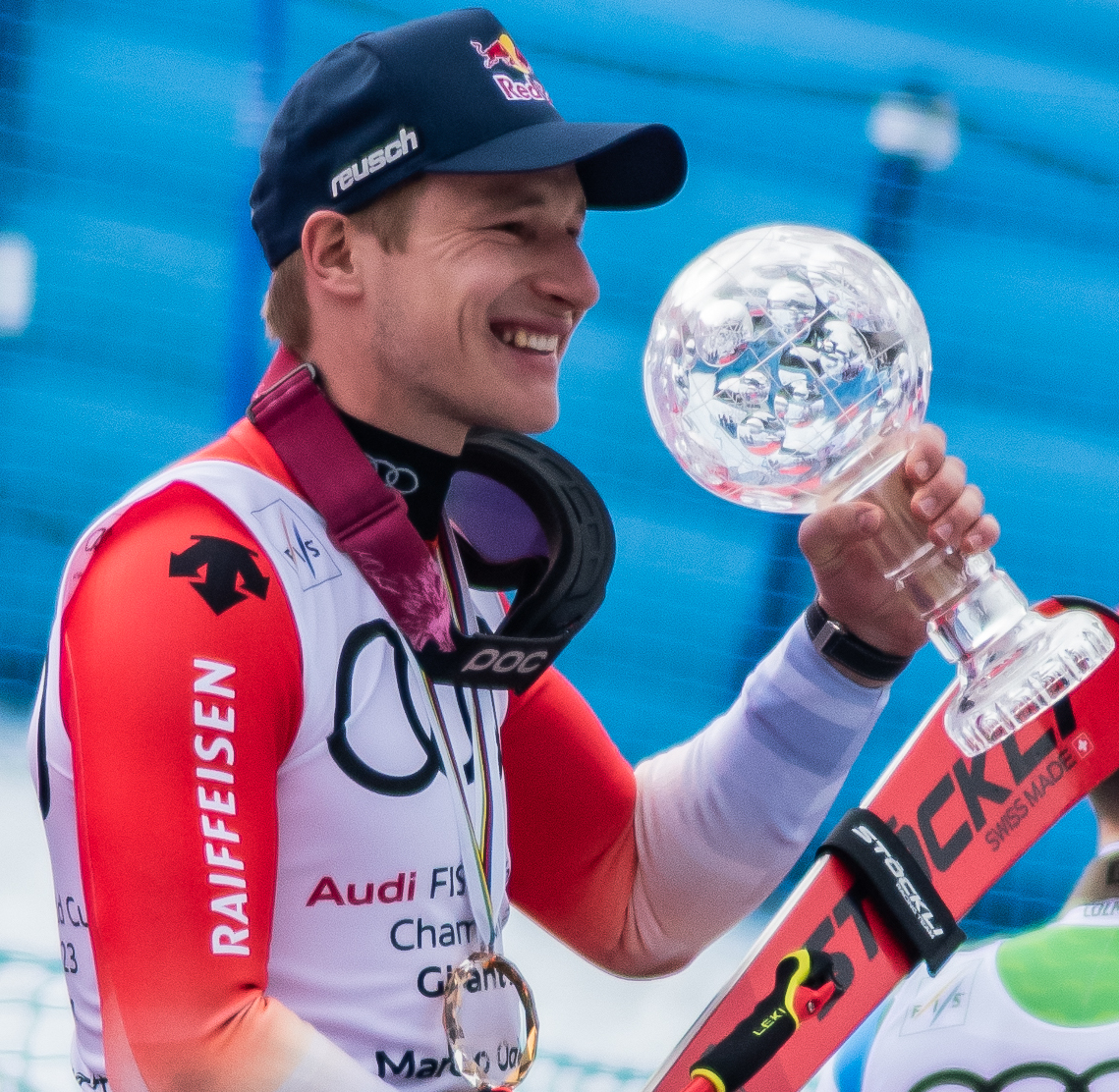
Marco Odermatt defended the World Cup title, winning the crystal globe for the 3rd time in a row, 13 times this season and 3 small globes.

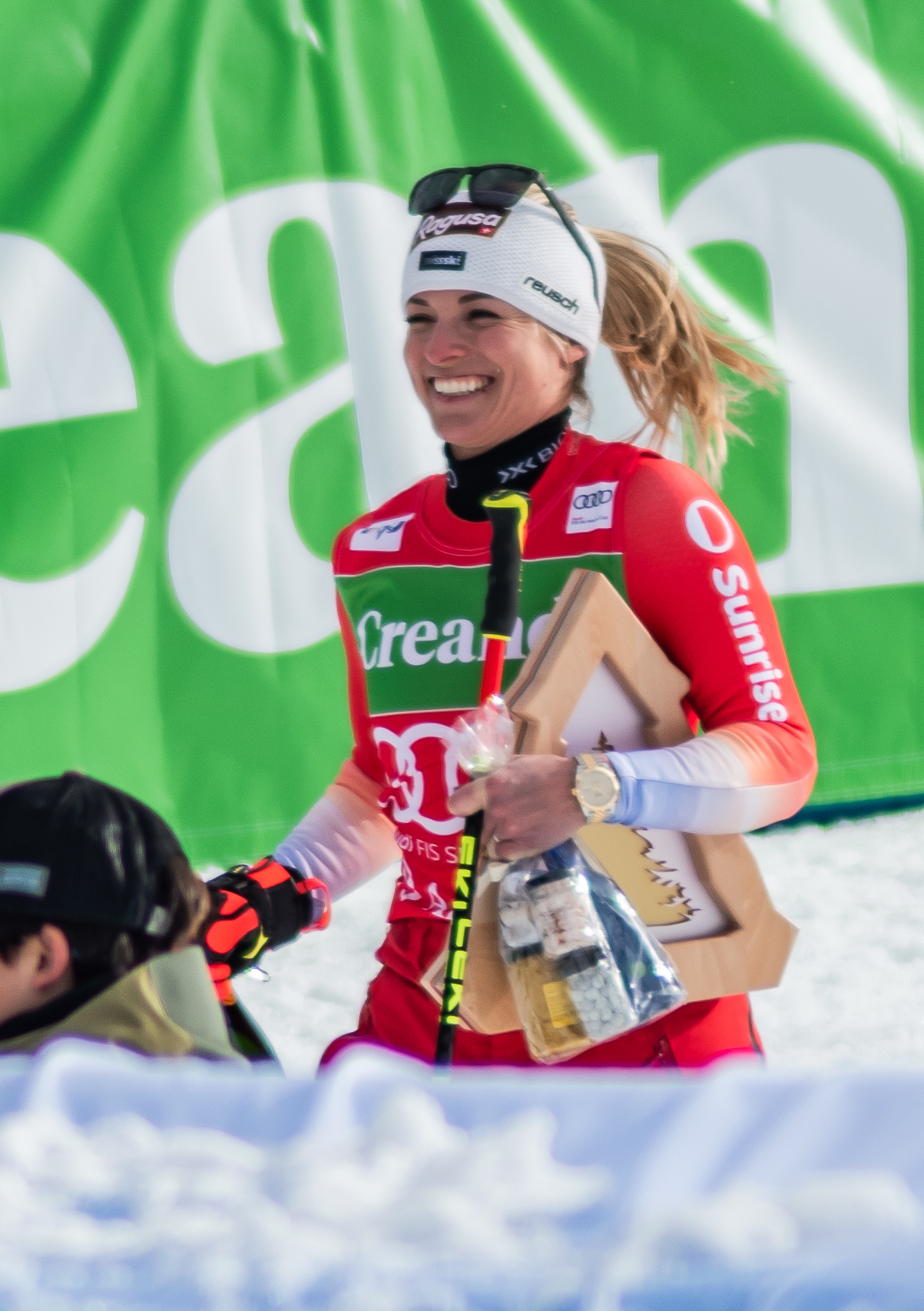
Lara Gut-Behrami won her second overall World Cup title in history, winning previously in the 2015–2016 season.

The 2023–24 FIS Alpine Ski World Cup, organised by the International Ski Federation (FIS) was the 58th World Cup season in alpine skiing for men and women.

The season started on 28 October 2023 in Sölden, Austria, and concluded on 24 March 2024 at the finals in Saalbach, Austria.

Marco Odermatt and Mikaela Shiffrin were the reigning overall champions from the last two seasons. Odermatt successfully defended the title, while Shiffrin finished the season in 3rd place. Lara Gut-Behrami won the women’s overall title for the second time in her career.

On 25 October, FIS prolonged the suspension of the Russian and Belarusian national team from competitions due to the Russian invasion of Ukraine.

== Season overview ==
On 9 December, Joan Verdú took third place in the men's giant slalom at Val d'Isère, which was the first World Cup podium for Andorra.

For the first time ever in a Women's World Cup and first time since 2018 (Men's Super-G in Beaver Creek), five skiers stood on the podium (Downhill in Cortina d'Ampezzo).

During the season, many skiers who have victories in the World Cup were injured during training or the competition itself and had to end the season, including: Marco Schwarz, Wendy Holdener, Alexis Pinturault, Aleksander Aamodt Kilde, Petra Vlhová, Corinne Suter, Sofia Goggia and Elena Curtoni.

For the first time in the history of the World Cup, during the slalom in Chamonix, Daniel Yule won the competition, taking 30th place after the first run, thus breaking the record of Lucas Braathen, who won the slalom in Wengen after being in 29th place after the first run.

This season, 21 races have been canceled due to weather conditions.

== Map of world cup hosts ==
All 37 locations hosting world cup events for men (21), women (22), and shared (8) this season.

Europe
North Italy	Austria
North America	Switzerland

Women Men Shared

== Men ==
The number of races in the World Cup history

Total	DH	SG	GS	SL	AC	PS	PG	CE	K.O.	Winners
1927	532	245	457	538	134	2	8	10	1	307

after SG in Saalbach (22 March 2024)

=== Calendar ===
Event key: DH – Downhill, SL – Slalom, GS – Giant slalom, SG – Super giant slalom
All	#	Date	Venue (slope %)	Type	Winner	Second	Third	R.
		29 October 2023	(Austria) Sölden (Rettenbach 68.2%)	GS _{cnx}	cancelled due to strong wind after 47 skiers had run; moved to Aspen			
		11 November 2023	(Switzerland) (Italy) Zermatt-Cervinia (Gran Becca 60%)	DH _{cnx}	cancelled due to heavy snowfall; one downhill moved to Val Gardena/Gröden			
		12 November 2023	(Switzerland) (Italy) Zermatt-Cervinia (Gran Becca 60%)	DH _{cnx}	cancelled due to heavy snowfall; one downhill moved to Val Gardena/Gröden			
1893	1	18 November 2023	(Austria) Gurgl (Kirchenkar)	SL _{529}	(Austria) Manuel Feller	(Austria) Marco Schwarz	(Austria) Michael Matt	
		1 December 2023	(United States) Beaver Creek (Birds of Prey 68%)	DH _{cnx}	cancelled due to heavy snowfall and strong wind; one downhill moved to Wengen			
		2 December 2023	(United States) Beaver Creek (Birds of Prey 68%)	DH _{cnx}	cancelled due to heavy snowfall and strong wind; one downhill moved to Wengen			
		3 December 2023	(United States) Beaver Creek (Birds of Prey 68%)	SG _{cnx}	cancelled due to heavy snowfall and strong wind; one downhill moved to Wengen			
1894	2	9 December 2023	(France) Val d'Isère (La face de Bellevarde 71%)	GS _{448}	(Switzerland) Marco Odermatt	(Austria) Marco Schwarz	(Andorra) Joan Verdú	
		10 December 2023	(France) Val d'Isère (La face de Bellevarde 71%)	SL _{cnx}	cancelled due to wet snow and strong wind			
1895	3	(Note: Men's cancelled downhill from Zermatt-Cervinia was rescheduled to Val Gardena/Gröden on 14 December 2023.)14 December 2023	(Italy) Val Gardena/Gröden (Saslong 56.9%)	DH _{525}	(United States) Bryce Bennett	(Norway) Aleksander Aamodt Kilde	(Switzerland) Marco Odermatt	
1896	4	15 December 2023	(Italy) Val Gardena/Gröden (Saslong 56.9%)	SG _{239}	(Austria) Vincent Kriechmayr	(Austria) Daniel Hemetsberger	(Switzerland) Marco Odermatt	
1897	5	16 December 2023	(Italy) Val Gardena/Gröden (Saslong 56.9%)	DH _{526}	(Italy) Dominik Paris	(Norway) Aleksander Aamodt Kilde	(United States) Bryce Bennett	
1898	6	17 December 2023	(Italy) Alta Badia (Gran Risa 69%)	GS _{449}	(Switzerland) Marco Odermatt	(Croatia) Filip Zubčić	(Slovenia) Žan Kranjec	
1899	7	18 December 2023	(Italy) Alta Badia (Gran Risa 69%)	GS _{450}	(Switzerland) Marco Odermatt	(Austria) Marco Schwarz	(Slovenia) Žan Kranjec	
1900	8	22 December 2023	(Italy) Madonna di Campiglio (Canalone Miramonti 60%)	SL _{530}	(Austria) Marco Schwarz	(France) Clément Noël	(United Kingdom) Dave Ryding	
1901	9	28 December 2023	(Italy) Bormio (Stelvio 63%)	DH _{527}	(France) Cyprien Sarrazin	(Switzerland) Marco Odermatt	(Canada) Cameron Alexander	
1902	10	29 December 2023	(Italy) Bormio (Stelvio 63%)	SG _{240}	(Switzerland) Marco Odermatt	(Austria) Raphael Haaser	(Norway) Aleksander Aamodt Kilde	
1903	11	6 January 2024	(Switzerland) Adelboden (Chuenisbärgli 60%)	GS _{451}	(Switzerland) Marco Odermatt	(Norway) Aleksander Aamodt Kilde	(Croatia) Filip Zubčić	
1904	12	7 January 2024	(Switzerland) Adelboden (Chuenisbärgli 60%)	SL _{531}	(Austria) Manuel Feller	(Norway) Atle Lie McGrath	(Austria) Dominik Raschner	
1905	13	(Note: Men's cancelled downhill from Beaver Creek was rescheduled to Wengen on 11 January 2024.)11 January 2024	(Switzerland) Wengen (Lauberhorn 90% – Speed) (Männlichen 72% – Technical)	DH _{528}	(Switzerland) Marco Odermatt	(France) Cyprien Sarrazin	(Norway) Aleksander Aamodt Kilde	
1906	14	12 January 2024	(Switzerland) Wengen (Lauberhorn 90% – Speed) (Männlichen 72% – Technical)	SG _{241}	(France) Cyprien Sarrazin	(Switzerland) Marco Odermatt	(Norway) Aleksander Aamodt Kilde	
1907	15	13 January 2024	(Switzerland) Wengen (Lauberhorn 90% – Speed) (Männlichen 72% – Technical)	DH _{529}	(Switzerland) Marco Odermatt	(France) Cyprien Sarrazin	(Italy) Dominik Paris	
1908	16	14 January 2024	(Switzerland) Wengen (Lauberhorn 90% – Speed) (Männlichen 72% – Technical)	SL _{532}	(Austria) Manuel Feller	(Norway) Atle Lie McGrath	(Norway) Henrik Kristoffersen	
1909	17	19 January 2024	(Austria) Kitzbühel (Streif 85% – Speed) (Ganslern 70% – Technical)	DH _{530}	(France) Cyprien Sarrazin	(Italy) Florian Schieder	(Switzerland) Marco Odermatt	
1910	18	20 January 2024	(Austria) Kitzbühel (Streif 85% – Speed) (Ganslern 70% – Technical)	DH _{531}	(France) Cyprien Sarrazin	(Switzerland) Marco Odermatt	(Italy) Dominik Paris	
1911	19	21 January 2024	(Austria) Kitzbühel (Streif 85% – Speed) (Ganslern 70% – Technical)	SL _{533}	(Germany) Linus Straßer	(Sweden) Kristoffer Jakobsen	(Switzerland) Daniel Yule	
1912	20	23 January 2024	(Austria) Schladming (Planai 54%)	GS _{452}	(Switzerland) Marco Odermatt	(Austria) Manuel Feller	(Slovenia) Žan Kranjec	
1913	21	24 January 2024	(Austria) Schladming (Planai 54%)	SL _{534}	(Germany) Linus Straßer	(Norway) Timon Haugan	(France) Clément Noël	
1914	22	27 January 2024	(Germany) Garmisch-Partenkirchen (Kandahar 1 85%)	SG _{242}	(France) Nils Allègre	(Italy) Guglielmo Bosca	(Switzerland) Loïc Meillard	
1915	23	28 January 2024	(Germany) Garmisch-Partenkirchen (Kandahar 1 85%)	SG _{243}	(Switzerland) Marco Odermatt	(Austria) Raphael Haaser	(Switzerland) Franjo von Allmen	
		2 February 2024	(France) Chamonix (La Verte des Houches – SL)	DH _{cnx}	cancelled due to the high temperatures and unfavorable snow conditions			
		3 February 2024	(France) Chamonix (La Verte des Houches – SL)	DH _{cnx}	cancelled due to the high temperatures and unfavorable snow conditions			
1916	24	4 February 2024	(France) Chamonix (La Verte des Houches – SL)	SL _{535}	(Switzerland) Daniel Yule	(Switzerland) Loïc Meillard	(France) Clément Noël	
1917	25	10 February 2024	(Bulgaria) Bansko (Banderitza)	GS _{453}	(Switzerland) Marco Odermatt	(Norway) Alexander Steen Olsen	(Austria) Manuel Feller	
		11 February 2024	(Bulgaria) Bansko (Banderitza)	SL _{cnx}	cancelled due to heavy rain after 31 skiers had run			
1918	26	17 February 2024	(Norway) Kvitfjell (Olympiabakken)	DH _{532}	(Switzerland) Niels Hintermann	(Austria) Vincent Kriechmayr	(Canada) Cameron Alexander	
1919	27	18 February 2024	(Norway) Kvitfjell (Olympiabakken)	SG _{244}	(Austria) Vincent Kriechmayr	(Canada) Jeffrey Read	(Switzerland) Marco Odermatt (Italy) Dominik Paris	
1920	28	24 February 2024	(United States) Palisades Tahoe (Red Dog)	GS _{454}	(Switzerland) Marco Odermatt	(Norway) Henrik Kristoffersen	(United States) River Radamus	
1921	29	25 February 2024	(United States) Palisades Tahoe (Red Dog)	SL _{536}	(Austria) Manuel Feller	(France) Clément Noël	(Germany) Linus Straßer	
1922	30	(Note: Men's cancelled giant slalom from Sölden was rescheduled to Aspen on 1 March 2024.)1 March 2024	(United States) Aspen (Strawpile – GS) (Lower Ruthies Run – SL)	GS _{455}	(Switzerland) Marco Odermatt	(Switzerland) Loïc Meillard	(Norway) Atle Lie McGrath	
1923	31	2 March 2024	(United States) Aspen (Strawpile – GS) (Lower Ruthies Run – SL)	GS _{456}	(Switzerland) Marco Odermatt	(Switzerland) Loïc Meillard	(Norway) Timon Haugan	
1924	32	3 March 2024	(United States) Aspen (Strawpile – GS) (Lower Ruthies Run – SL)	SL _{537}	(Switzerland) Loïc Meillard	(Germany) Linus Straßer	(Norway) Henrik Kristoffersen	
		9 March 2024	(Slovenia) Kranjska Gora (Podkoren 3 59%)	GS _{cnx}	cancelled due to unfavourable weather conditions (heavy rain)			
		(Note: Men's cancelled giant slalom on 9 March was replaced by a slalom that was originally scheduled for 10 March.)9 March 2024	(Slovenia) Kranjska Gora (Podkoren 3 59%)	SL _{cnx}	cancelled due to unfavourable weather conditions (heavy rain)			
World Cup Season Final
1925	33	16 March 2024	(Austria) Saalbach (Schneekristall-Zwölfer – GS 72%) (Ulli Maier – SL, DH, SG)	GS _{457}	(Switzerland) Loïc Meillard	(Andorra) Joan Verdú	(Switzerland) Thomas Tumler	
1926	34	17 March 2024	(Austria) Saalbach (Schneekristall-Zwölfer – GS 72%) (Ulli Maier – SL, DH, SG)	SL _{538}	(Norway) Timon Haugan	(Austria) Manuel Feller	(Germany) Linus Straßer	
1927	35	22 March 2024	(Austria) Saalbach (Schneekristall-Zwölfer – GS 72%) (Ulli Maier – SL, DH, SG)	SG _{245}	(Switzerland) Stefan Rogentin	(Switzerland) Loïc Meillard	(Switzerland) Arnaud Boisset	
		24 March 2024	(Austria) Saalbach (Schneekristall-Zwölfer – GS 72%) (Ulli Maier – SL, DH, SG)	DH _{cnx}	cancelled due to snowfall and strong wind			
58th FIS World Cup Overall (18 November 2023 – 22 March 2024)					(Switzerland) Marco Odermatt	(Switzerland) Loïc Meillard	(Austria) Manuel Feller	

=== Overall leaders ===
No.	Holder	Date gained	Place	Date forfeited	Place	Number of competitions
1.	(Austria) Manuel Feller	18 November 2023	(Austria) Gurgl	9 December 2023	(France) Val d'Isère	1
2.	(Austria) Marco Schwarz	9 December 2023	(France) Val d'Isère	15 December 2023	(Italy) Val Gardena/Gröden	2
3.	(Switzerland) Marco Odermatt	14 December 2023 (Note: Both Odermatt and Schwarz were the leaders.)	(Italy) Val Gardena/Gröden	22 December 2023	(Italy) Madonna di Campiglio	5
4.	(Austria) Marco Schwarz	22 December 2023	(Italy) Madonna di Campiglio	28 December 2023	(Italy) Bormio	1
5.	(Switzerland) Marco Odermatt	28 December 2023	(Italy) Bormio	Overall Winner		26

=== Rankings ===
==== Overall ====
Rank	after all 35 events	Points
	(Switzerland) Marco Odermatt	1947
2	(Switzerland) Loïc Meillard	1073
3	(Austria) Manuel Feller	952
4	(Norway) Henrik Kristoffersen	754
5	(France) Cyprien Sarrazin	734

==== Downhill ====
Rank	after all 8 events	Points
	(Switzerland) Marco Odermatt	552
2	(France) Cyprien Sarrazin	510
3	(Italy) Dominik Paris	342
4	(Austria) Vincent Kriechmayr	298
5	(United States) Bryce Bennett	257

==== Super-G ====
Rank	after all 7 events	Points
	(Switzerland) Marco Odermatt	495
2	(Austria) Vincent Kriechmayr	409
3	(Austria) Raphael Haaser	271
4	(Switzerland) Stefan Rogentin	244
5	(Italy) Guglielmo Bosca	230

==== Giant slalom ====
Rank	after all 10 events	Points
	(Switzerland) Marco Odermatt	900
2	(Switzerland) Loïc Meillard	468
3	(Croatia) Filip Zubčić	402
4	(Norway) Henrik Kristoffersen	395
5	(Slovenia) Žan Kranjec	347

==== Slalom ====
Rank	after all 10 events	Points
	(Austria) Manuel Feller	715
2	(Germany) Linus Straßer	526
3	(Norway) Timon Haugan	450
4	(Switzerland) Loïc Meillard	409
5	(France) Clément Noël	397

== Women ==
The number of races in the World Cup history

Total	DH	SG	GS	SL	AC	PS	PG	CE	K.O.	Winners
1811	450	270	456	509	106	6	3	10	1	257

after DH in Saalbach (23 March 2024)

=== Calendar ===
Event key: DH – Downhill, SL – Slalom, GS – Giant slalom, SG – Super giant slalom
All	#	Date	Venue (slope %)	Type	Winner	Second	Third	R.
1773	1	28 October 2023	(Austria) Sölden (Rettenbach 68.2%)	GS _{446}	(Switzerland) Lara Gut-Behrami	(Italy) Federica Brignone	(Slovakia) Petra Vlhová	
1774	2	11 November 2023	(Finland) Levi (Levi Black 52%)	SL _{499}	(Slovakia) Petra Vlhová	(Germany) Lena Dürr	(Austria) Katharina Liensberger	
1775	3	12 November 2023	(Finland) Levi (Levi Black 52%)	SL _{500}	(United States) Mikaela Shiffrin	(Croatia) Leona Popović	(Germany) Lena Dürr	
		18 November 2023	(Switzerland) (Italy) Zermatt-Cervinia (Gran Becca 60%)	DH _{cnx}	cancelled due to strong wind			
		19 November 2023	(Switzerland) (Italy) Zermatt-Cervinia (Gran Becca 60%)	DH _{cnx}	cancelled due to strong wind			
1776	4	25 November 2023	(United States) Killington (Superstar 67%)	GS _{447}	(Switzerland) Lara Gut-Behrami	(New Zealand) Alice Robinson	(United States) Mikaela Shiffrin	
1777	5	26 November 2023	(United States) Killington (Superstar 67%)	SL _{501}	(United States) Mikaela Shiffrin	(Slovakia) Petra Vlhová	(Switzerland) Wendy Holdener	
1778	6	2 December 2023	(Canada) Tremblant (Flying Mile 42%)	GS _{448}	(Italy) Federica Brignone	(Slovakia) Petra Vlhová	(United States) Mikaela Shiffrin	
1779	7	3 December 2023	(Canada) Tremblant (Flying Mile 42%)	GS _{449}	(Italy) Federica Brignone	(Switzerland) Lara Gut-Behrami	(United States) Mikaela Shiffrin	
1780	8	8 December 2023	(Switzerland) St. Moritz (Corviglia 61%)	SG _{262}	(Italy) Sofia Goggia	(Austria) Cornelia Hütter	(Switzerland) Lara Gut-Behrami	
1781	9	9 December 2023	(Switzerland) St. Moritz (Corviglia 61%)	DH _{443}	(United States) Mikaela Shiffrin	(Italy) Sofia Goggia	(Italy) Federica Brignone	
		10 December 2023	(Switzerland) St. Moritz (Corviglia 61%)	SG _{cnx}	cancelled due to heavy and wet snow and moved to Zauchensee			
1782	10	16 December 2023	(France) Val d'Isère (Piste Oreiller-Killy 52%)	DH _{444}	(Switzerland) Jasmine Flury	(Switzerland) Joana Hählen	(Austria) Cornelia Hütter	
1783	11	17 December 2023	(France) Val d'Isère (Piste Oreiller-Killy 52%)	SG _{263}	(Italy) Federica Brignone	(Norway) Kajsa Vickhoff Lie	(Italy) Sofia Goggia	
1784	12	21 December 2023	(France) Courchevel (Stade Émile-Allais 58.5%)	SL _{502}	(Slovakia) Petra Vlhová	(United States) Mikaela Shiffrin	(Austria) Katharina Truppe	
1785	13	28 December 2023	(Austria) Lienz (Schlossberg 54%)	GS _{450}	(United States) Mikaela Shiffrin	(Italy) Federica Brignone	(Sweden) Sara Hector	
1786	14	29 December 2023	(Austria) Lienz (Schlossberg 54%)	SL _{503}	(United States) Mikaela Shiffrin	(Germany) Lena Dürr	(Switzerland) Michelle Gisin	
1787	15	6 January 2024	(Slovenia) Kranjska Gora (Podkoren 3 59%)	GS _{451}	(Canada) Valérie Grenier	(Switzerland) Lara Gut-Behrami	(Italy) Federica Brignone	
1788	16	7 January 2024	(Slovenia) Kranjska Gora (Podkoren 3 59%)	SL _{504}	(Slovakia) Petra Vlhová	(Germany) Lena Dürr	(United States) AJ Hurt	
1789	17	(Note: Women's cancelled Super-G from St.Moritz was rescheduled to Altenmarkt-Zauchensee on 12 January 2024.)12 January 2024	(Austria) Altenmarkt-Zauchensee (Kälberloch 70%)	SG _{264}	(Austria) Cornelia Hütter	(Norway) Kajsa Vickhoff Lie	(Switzerland) Lara Gut-Behrami	
1790	18	13 January 2024	(Austria) Altenmarkt-Zauchensee (Kälberloch 70%)	DH _{445}	(Italy) Sofia Goggia	(Austria) Stephanie Venier	(Italy) Nicol Delago (Austria) Mirjam Puchner	
1791	19	14 January 2024	(Austria) Altenmarkt-Zauchensee (Kälberloch 70%)	SG _{265}	(Switzerland) Lara Gut-Behrami	(Austria) Cornelia Hütter	(Austria) Mirjam Puchner	
1792	20	16 January 2024	(Austria) Flachau (Griessenkar 53%)	SL _{505}	(United States) Mikaela Shiffrin	(Slovakia) Petra Vlhová	(Sweden) Sara Hector	
1793	21	20 January 2024	(Slovakia) Jasná (Luková 2 54%)	GS _{452}	(Sweden) Sara Hector	(United States) Mikaela Shiffrin	(New Zealand) Alice Robinson	
1794	22	21 January 2024	(Slovakia) Jasná (Luková 2 54%)	SL _{506}	(United States) Mikaela Shiffrin	(Croatia) Zrinka Ljutić	(Sweden) Anna Swenn-Larsson	
1795	23	26 January 2024	(Italy) Cortina d'Ampezzo (Olimpia delle Tofane 73%)	DH _{446}	(Austria) Stephanie Venier	(Switzerland) Lara Gut-Behrami	(Austria) Christina Ager (Italy) Sofia Goggia (Canada) Valérie Grenier	
1796	24	27 January 2024	(Italy) Cortina d'Ampezzo (Olimpia delle Tofane 73%)	DH _{447}	(Norway) Ragnhild Mowinckel	(United States) Jacqueline Wiles	(Italy) Sofia Goggia	
1797	25	28 January 2024	(Italy) Cortina d'Ampezzo (Olimpia delle Tofane 73%)	SG _{266}	(Switzerland) Lara Gut-Behrami	(Austria) Stephanie Venier	(France) Romane Miradoli	
1798	26	30 January 2024	(Italy) Kronplatz (Erta 61%)	GS _{453}	(Switzerland) Lara Gut-Behrami	(Sweden) Sara Hector (New Zealand) Alice Robinson		
		3 February 2024	(Germany) Garmisch-Partenkirchen (Kandahar 1 85%)	DH _{cnx}	cancelled due to warm weather and unfavorable snow conditions			
		4 February 2024	(Germany) Garmisch-Partenkirchen (Kandahar 1 85%)	SG _{cnx}	cancelled due to warm weather and unfavorable snow conditions			
1799	27	10 February 2024	(Andorra) Soldeu (Avet 65%)	GS _{454}	(Switzerland) Lara Gut-Behrami	(New Zealand) Alice Robinson	(United States) AJ Hurt	
1800	28	11 February 2024	(Andorra) Soldeu (Avet 65%)	SL _{507}	(Sweden) Anna Swenn-Larsson	(Croatia) Zrinka Ljutić	(United States) Paula Moltzan	
1801	29	16 February 2024	(Switzerland) Crans-Montana (Mont Lachaux 53%)	DH _{448}	(Switzerland) Lara Gut-Behrami	(Switzerland) Jasmine Flury (Austria) Cornelia Hütter		
1802	30	17 February 2024	(Switzerland) Crans-Montana (Mont Lachaux 53%)	DH _{449}	(Italy) Marta Bassino	(Italy) Federica Brignone	(Switzerland) Lara Gut-Behrami	
1803	31	18 February 2024	(Switzerland) Crans-Montana (Mont Lachaux 53%)	SG _{267}	(Austria) Stephanie Venier	(Italy) Federica Brignone	(Italy) Marta Bassino	
		24 February 2024	(Italy) Val di Fassa (La Volata 57%)	SG _{cnx}	cancelled due to heavy snowfall (one race moved to Kvitfjell on 2 March)			
		25 February 2024	(Italy) Val di Fassa (La Volata 57%)	SG _{cnx}	cancelled due to heavy snowfall (one race moved to Kvitfjell on 2 March)			
		2 March 2024	(Norway) Kvitfjell (Olympiabakken)	DH _{cnx}	cancelled due to wind, fog and lack of training			
1804	32	(Note: Women's cancelled Super-G from Val di Fassa was rescheduled Kvitfjell on 2 March 2024.)2 March 2024	(Norway) Kvitfjell (Olympiabakken)	SG _{268}	(Switzerland) Lara Gut-Behrami	(Austria) Cornelia Hütter	(Austria) Mirjam Puchner	
1805	33	3 March 2024	(Norway) Kvitfjell (Olympiabakken)	SG _{269}	(Italy) Federica Brignone	(Switzerland) Lara Gut-Behrami	(Czech Republic) Ester Ledecká	
1806	34	9 March 2024	(Sweden) Åre (Störtloppsbacken)	GS _{455}	(Italy) Federica Brignone	(Sweden) Sara Hector	(Switzerland) Lara Gut-Behrami	
1807	35	10 March 2024	(Sweden) Åre (Störtloppsbacken)	SL _{508}	(United States) Mikaela Shiffrin	(Croatia) Zrinka Ljutić	(Switzerland) Michelle Gisin	
World Cup Season Final
1808	36	16 March 2024	(Austria) Saalbach (Schneekristall-Zwölfer – GS 72%) (Ulli Maier – SL, DH, SG)	SL _{509}	(United States) Mikaela Shiffrin	(Norway) Mina Fürst Holtmann	(Sweden) Anna Swenn-Larsson	
1809	37	17 March 2024	(Austria) Saalbach (Schneekristall-Zwölfer – GS 72%) (Ulli Maier – SL, DH, SG)	GS _{456}	(Italy) Federica Brignone	(New Zealand) Alice Robinson	(Norway) Thea Louise Stjernesund	
1810	38	22 March 2024	(Austria) Saalbach (Schneekristall-Zwölfer – GS 72%) (Ulli Maier – SL, DH, SG)	SG _{270}	(Czech Republic) Ester Ledecká	(Italy) Federica Brignone	(Norway) Kajsa Vickhoff Lie	
1811	39	23 March 2024	(Austria) Saalbach (Schneekristall-Zwölfer – GS 72%) (Ulli Maier – SL, DH, SG)	DH _{450}	(Austria) Cornelia Hütter	(Slovenia) Ilka Štuhec	(Italy) Nicol Delago	
58th FIS World Cup Overall (28 October 2023 – 23 March 2024)					(Switzerland) Lara Gut-Behrami	(Italy) Federica Brignone	(United States) Mikaela Shiffrin	

=== Overall leaders ===
No.	Holder	Date gained	Place	Date forfeited	Place	Number of competitions
1.	(Switzerland) Lara Gut-Behrami	28 October 2023	(Austria) Sölden	11 November 2023	(Finland) Levi	1
2.	(Slovakia) Petra Vlhová	11 November 2023	(Finland) Levi	12 November 2023	(Finland) Levi	1
3.	(United States) Mikaela Shiffrin	12 November 2023	(Finland) Levi	10 February 2024	(Andorra) Soldeu	24
4.	(Switzerland) Lara Gut-Behrami	10 February 2024	(Andorra) Soldeu	Overall Winner		13

=== Rankings ===
==== Overall ====
Rank	after all 39 events	Points
	(Switzerland) Lara Gut-Behrami	1716
2	(Italy) Federica Brignone	1581
3	(United States) Mikaela Shiffrin	1409
4	(Sweden) Sara Hector	922
5	(Austria) Cornelia Hütter	913

==== Downhill ====
Rank	after all 8 events	Points
	(Austria) Cornelia Hütter	397
2	(Switzerland) Lara Gut-Behrami	369
3	(Italy) Sofia Goggia	350
4	(Austria) Stephanie Venier	346
5	(Italy) Federica Brignone	281

==== Super-G ====
Rank	after all 9 events	Points
	(Switzerland) Lara Gut-Behrami	576
2	(Italy) Federica Brignone	546
3	(Austria) Cornelia Hütter	516
4	(Austria) Stephanie Venier	380
5	(Norway) Kajsa Vickhoff Lie	337

==== Giant slalom ====
Rank	after all 11 events	Points
	(Switzerland) Lara Gut-Behrami	771
2	(Italy) Federica Brignone	750
3	(Sweden) Sara Hector	583
4	(New Zealand) Alice Robinson	492
5	(United States) Mikaela Shiffrin	429

==== Slalom ====
Rank	after all 11 events	Points
	(United States) Mikaela Shiffrin	830
2	(Germany) Lena Dürr	508
3	(Slovakia) Petra Vlhová	505
4	(Switzerland) Michelle Gisin	418
5	(Sweden) Anna Swenn-Larsson	395

== Nations Cup ==
Overall

Rank	after all 74 events	Points
1	Switzerland	10882
2	Austria	9287
3	Italy	6817
4	Norway	5190
5	United States	3998

Men

Rank	after all 35 events	Points
1	Switzerland	6238
2	Austria	4310
3	Norway	3065
4	France	2745
5	Italy	2464

Women

Rank	after all 39 events	Points
1	Austria	4977
2	Switzerland	4644
3	Italy	4353
4	United States	2676
5	Norway	2125

== Prize money ==
Top-5 men

Rank	after all 35 events	CHF
1	(Switzerland) Marco Odermatt	810,000
2	(France) Cyprien Sarrazin	365,500
3	(Austria) Manuel Feller	317,050
4	(Switzerland) Loïc Meillard	287,500
5	(Germany) Linus Straßer	219.600

Top-5 women

Rank	after all 39 events	CHF
1	(Switzerland) Lara Gut-Behrami	574,200
2	(United States) Mikaela Shiffrin	557,000
3	(Italy) Federica Brignone	484,000
4	(Slovakia) Petra Vlhová	263,200
5	(Austria) Cornelia Hütter	238,750

== Podium table by nation ==
Table showing the World Cup podium places (gold–1st place, silver–2nd place, bronze–3rd place) by the countries represented by the athletes.

Rank	Nation	Gold	Silver	Bronze	Total
1	Switzerland	27	13	16	56
2	Austria	11	15	10	36
3	Italy	10	8	11	29
4	United States	10	3	8	21
5	France	5	4	3	12
6	Slovakia	3	3	1	7
7	Norway	2	11	9	22
8	Germany	2	4	3	9
9	Sweden	2	3	4	9
10	Canada	1	1	3	5
11	Czech Republic	1	0	1	2
12	Croatia	0	5	1	6
13	New Zealand	0	4	1	5
14	Slovenia	0	1	3	4
15	Andorra	0	1	1	2
16	Great Britain	0	0	1	1
Totals (16 entries)		74	76	76	226

== Achievements ==
First World Cup career victory

Men

- (France) Nils Allègre (30), in his 9th season – Super-G in Garmisch-Partenkirchen
- (Norway) Timon Haugan (27), in his 7th season – Slalom in Saalbach
- (Switzerland) Stefan Rogentin (29), in his 8th season – Super-G in Saalbach

Women

First World Cup podium

Men

- (France) Nils Allègre (30), in his 9th season – Super-G in Garmisch-Partenkirchen – 1st place
- (Italy) Guglielmo Bosca (30), in his 8th season – Super-G in Garmisch-Partenkirchen – 2nd place
- (Canada) Jeffrey Read (26), in his 7th season – Super-G in Kvitfjell – 2nd place
- (Andorra) Joan Verdú (28), in his 6th season – Giant Slalom in Val d'Isère – 3rd place
- (Switzerland) Franjo von Allmen (22), in his 2nd season – Super-G in Garmisch-Partenkirchen – 3rd place
- (United States) River Radamus (26), in his 7th season – Giant Slalom in Palisades Tahoe – 3rd place
- (Switzerland) Arnaud Boisset (25), in his 1st season – Super-G in Saalbach – 3rd place

Women

- (United States) AJ Hurt (23), in her 7th season – Slalom in Kranjska Gora – 3rd place
- (Austria) Christina Ager (28), in her 10th season – Downhill in Cortina d'Ampezzo – 3rd place

Number of wins this season (in brackets are all-time wins)

Men

- (Switzerland) Marco Odermatt – 13 (37)
- (Austria) Manuel Feller – 4 (6)
- (France) Cyprien Sarrazin – 4 (5)
- (Austria) Vincent Kriechmayr – 2 (18)
- (Germany) Linus Straßer – 2 (5)
- (Switzerland) Loïc Meillard – 2 (4)
- (Italy) Dominik Paris – 1 (22)
- (Switzerland) Daniel Yule – 1 (7)
- (Austria) Marco Schwarz – 1 (6)
- (Switzerland) Niels Hintermann – 1 (3)
- (United States) Bryce Bennett – 1 (2)
- (France) Nils Allègre – 1 (1)
- (Norway) Timon Haugan – 1 (1)
- (Switzerland) Stefan Rogentin – 1 (1)

Women

- (United States) Mikaela Shiffrin – 9 (97) (Note: All-time record in World Cup history (after this season))
- (Switzerland) Lara Gut-Behrami – 8 (45)
- (Italy) Federica Brignone – 6 (27)
- (Slovakia) Petra Vlhová – 3 (31)
- (Italy) Sofia Goggia – 2 (24)
- (Austria) Cornelia Hütter – 2 (6)
- (Austria) Stephanie Venier – 2 (3)
- (Italy) Marta Bassino – 1 (7)
- (Sweden) Sara Hector – 1 (5)
- (Norway) Ragnhild Mowinckel – 1 (4)
- (Czech Republic) Ester Ledecká – 1 (4)
- (Switzerland) Jasmine Flury – 1 (2)
- (Canada) Valérie Grenier – 1 (2)
- (Sweden) Anna Swenn-Larsson – 1 (2)

== Retirements ==
The following notable skiers, who competed in the World Cup, announced their retirement during or after the 2023–24 season:

Men

- (Germany) Thomas Dreßen
- (Germany) Josef Ferstl
- (Slovenia) Štefan Hadalin
- (Italy) Alex Hofer
- (Austria) Roland Leitinger
- (Austria) Christopher Neumayer
- (United Kingdom) Charlie Raposo
- (Italy) Giuliano Razzoli
- (Switzerland) Gilles Roulin
- (Austria) Julian Schütter
- (Switzerland) Ralph Weber

Women

- (France) Anouck Errard
- (Germany) Andrea Filser
- (United Kingdom) Charlie Guest
- (Switzerland) Vivianne Härri
- (Austria) Michaela Heider
- (Sweden) Emelie Henning
- (Germany) Katrin Hirtl-Stanggaßinger
- (Sweden) Lisa Hörnblad
- (Slovenia) Meta Hrovat
- (Austria) Sabrina Maier
- (Austria) Chiara Mair
- (United States) Alice Merryweather
- (Austria) Elisa Mörzinger
- (Norway) Ragnhild Mowinckel
- (Italy) Karoline Pichler
- (Austria) Christine Scheyer
- (Austria) Rosina Schneeberger
- (Austria) Marie-Therese Sporer
- (Switzerland) Juliana Suter
- (Norway) Maria Therese Tviberg

== See also ==
- 2023–24 FIS Alpine Ski Continental Cup
- 2023–24 FIS Alpine Ski Europa Cup
- 2023–24 FIS Alpine Ski Nor-Am Cup
- 2023 FIS Alpine Ski South American Cup
- 2023–24 FIS Alpine Ski Australia-New Zealand Cup
