= 2024 Alpine Skiing World Cup – Men's super-G =

Alpine ski discipline year standings

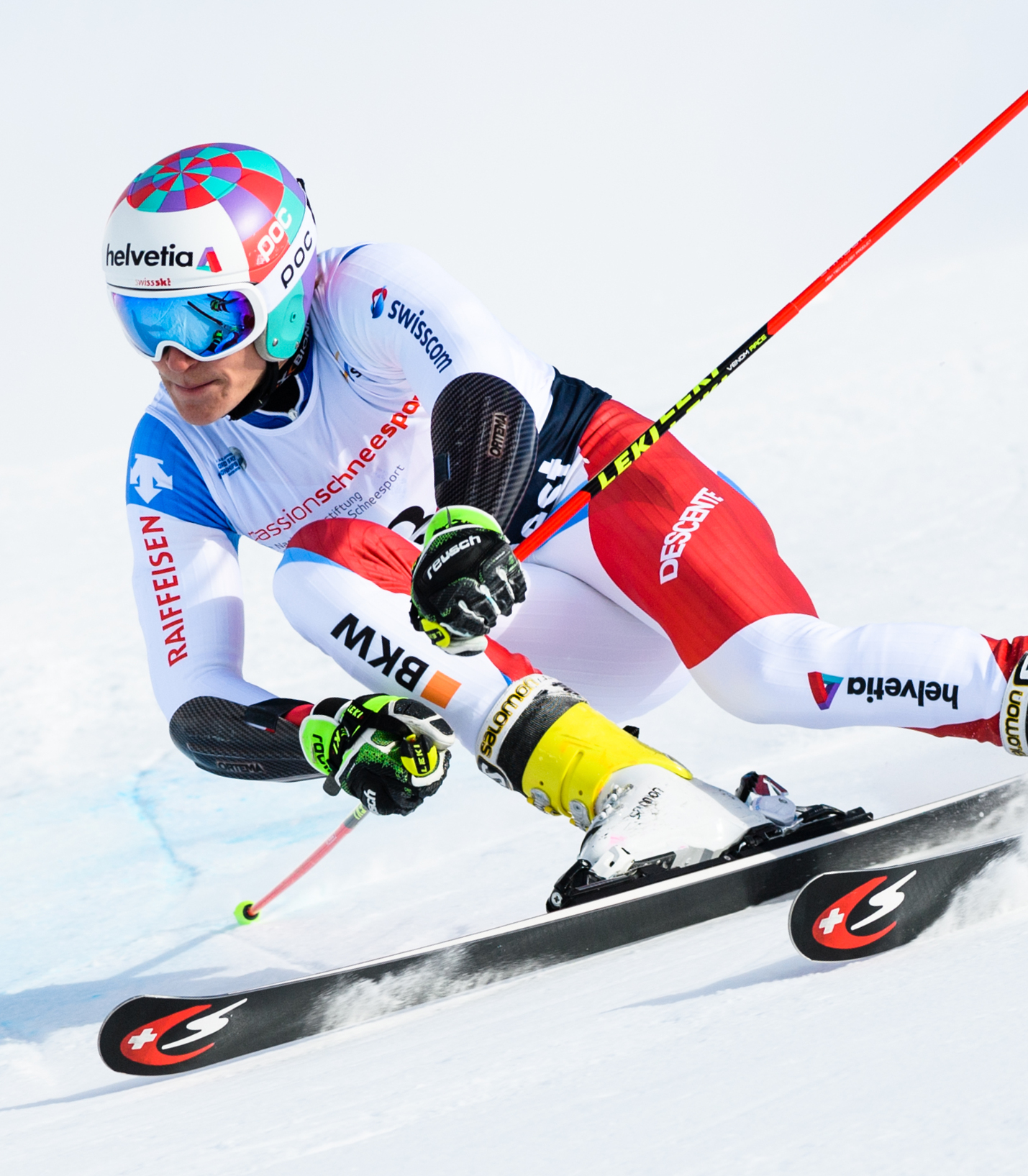
2024 Men's Super-G World Cup: Marco Odermatt of Switzerland, repeat discipline champion; 2024 Men's World Cup; Overall • Downhill • Super-G; Giant slalom • Slalom
Previous: 2023	Next: 2025

The men's super-G in the 2024 Alpine Skiing World Cup consisted of seven events, including the final. The first event of the season was not scheduled until 3 December 2023 in Beaver Creek, and six of the eight races were scheduled to be complete by the end of January 2024. However, as described below, the first race in Beaver Creek was canceled and not rescheduled.

== Season summary ==
The Super-G scheduled in Beaver Creek was cancelled due to high winds, as all three men's events over that weekend were cancelled for the same reason. When the first race of the season was finally held in Val Gardena/Gröden on 15 December, 2021 discipline champion Vincent Kriechmayr of Austria edged both his teammate Daniel Hemetsberger and defending discipline champion Marco Odermatt to seize the early lead in the discipline race, although Odermatt took over first in the overall competition..In the next event, Odermatt won and took over first in the discipline standings as well.

The next three super-Gs, all in January 2024, were won by three different skiers; Cyprien Sarrazin of France; Nils Allègre of France (his first World Cup podium); and Odermatt again. With his victory, Odermatt opened up a 121-lead in the discipline for the season, with only two races (200 points) to go. However, in Kvitfjell, the last race in the discipline before the finals, Kriechmayr triumphed while Odermatt only tied for third, giving Kriechmayr, now just 81 points behind Odermatt, at least a mathematical shot at the discipline crown.

== Finals ==
The World Cup discipline final took place on Friday, 22 March 2024 in Saalbach-Hinterglemm, Austria. Only the top 25 in the Super-G discipline ranking and the winner of the Junior World Championship in Super-G (Max Perathoner of Italy) were eligible to compete in the final, except that any skier who has scored at least 500 points in the overall classification for the season could participate in any discipline, regardless of his performance in that discipline during the season. Because of the reduced field size, only the top 15 finishers in each discipline scored points. Due to injuries during the season, Hemetsberger and two Norwegians -- Adrian Smiseth Sejersted and former discipline champion Aleksander Aamodt Kilde -- were unable to compete in the finals, and no 500-point skiers who were not otherwise eligible chose to compete, so the final field consisted of 23 racers.

In the final, Stefan Rogentin of Switzerland, who hadn't finished better than seventh all season, edged his countrymen Loïc Meillard and Arnaud Boisset for the top step of the podium, which gave Odermatt, who finished fifth, his second consecutive season title in the discipline.

== Standings ==
	Venue	3 Dec 2023; Beaver Creek	15 Dec 2023; Val Gardena/Gröden	29 Dec 2023; Bormio	12 Jan 2024; Wengen	27 Jan 2024; Garmisch	28 Jan 2024; Garmisch	18 Feb 2024; Kvitfjell	22 Mar 2024; Saalbach	
#	Skier	(United States)	(Italy)	(Italy)	(Switzerland)	(Germany)	(Germany)	(Norway)	(Austria)	Total
	(Switzerland) Marco Odermatt	x	60	100	80	50	100	60	45	495
2	(Austria) Vincent Kriechmayr	x	100	50	24	45	50	100	40	409
3	(Austria) Raphael Haaser	x	14	80	32	16	80	29	20	271
4	(Switzerland) Stefan Rogentin	x	15	22	29	36	22	20	100	244
5	(Italy) Guglielmo Bosca	x	26	0	45	80	13	40	26	230
6	(France) Cyprien Sarrazin	x	50	DNF	100	24	DNF	DNS	50	224
7	(Italy) Dominik Paris	x	0	DNF	50	32	15	60	40	197
8	(Switzerland) Loïc Meillard	x	DNS	32	12	60	12	DNS	80	196
9	(France) Nils Allègre	x	0	40	13	100	18	DNS	22	193
10	(Canada) Jeffrey Read	x	26	20	5	11	16	80	29	187
11	(Switzerland) Arnaud Boisset	x	12	3	18	22	36	32	60	183
12	(Canada) James Crawford	x	40	15	20	6	45	DNF	18	144
13	(Italy) Mattia Casse	x	32	DNF	26	15	24	26	16	139
14	(Austria) Stefan Babinsky	x	0	40	40	0	32	16	0	128
	(Switzerland) Franjo von Allmen	x	29	DNS	DNF	29	60	10	0	128
16	(Norway) Aleksander Aamodt Kilde	x	0	60	60	DNS				120
17	(Switzerland) Justin Murisier	x	0	45	36	18	20	DNF	0	119
18	(Norway) Adrian Smiseth Sejersted	x	16	DNF	22	40	40	DNS		118
19	(United States) Ryan Cochran-Siegle	x	0	12	10	26	26	24	0	98
20	(Canada) Cameron Alexander	x	36	DNF	0	8	7	45	0	96
21	(Austria) Daniel Hemetsberger	x	80	7	7	DNS				94
22	(Switzerland) Gino Caviezel	x	0	26	0	20	10	4	32	92
23	(United States) Jared Goldberg	x	26	13	4	0	3	8	24	78
24	(Austria) Daniel Danklmaier	x	0	24	15	0	14	0	0	53
25	(Austria) Lukas Feurstein	x	0	6	16	12	DNF	14	DNF	48
26	(Germany) Simon Jocher	x	11	10	2	13	DNF	11	NE	47
27	(United States) River Radamus	x	0	DNF	DNF	14	32	0	NE	46
28	(Austria) Marco Schwarz	x	45	DNS					NE	45
29	(Italy) Pietro Zazzi	x	0	2	0	DNS		40	NE	42
30	(United States) Kyle Negomir	x	7	4	DNF	0	0	22	NE	33
31	(United States) Sam Morse	x	1	5	0	0	8	18	NE	32
32	(Switzerland) Niels Hintermann	x	0	16	14	1	DNF	0	NE	31
	(France) Alexis Pinturault	x	2	29	DNF	DNS			NE	31
34	(Italy) Christof Innerhofer	x	0	DNF	8	2	6	12	NE	28
35	(Switzerland) Christoph Krenn	x	DNS	DNF	0	DNS	11	16	NE	27
36	(France) Blaise Giezendanner	x	7	14	0	0	0	5	NE	26
37	(Switzerland) Marco Kohler	x	5	20	DNS				NE	25
38	(United States) Bryce Bennett	x	18	0	3	0	2	0	NE	23
39	(Finland) Elian Lehto	x	0	8	0	0	DNF	13	NE	21
	(Austria) Otmar Striedinger	x	DNS		11	10	0	DNF	NE	21
41	(France) Adrien Théaux	x	20	0	DNS				NE	20
42	(France) Nils Alphand	x	9	DNQ	DNF	0	DNF	10	NE	19
	(Switzerland) Alexis Monney	x	8	11	0	0	DNF	0	NE	19
	(Switzerland) Gilles Roulin	x	0	10	9	0	DNF	0	NE	19
45	(Germany) Thomas Dreßen	x	13	DNS					NE	13
46	(Germany) Romed Baumann	x	3	0	0	9	0	0	NE	12
	(Germany) Andreas Sander	x	0	0	6	0	0	6	NE	12
48	(France) Florian Loriot	x	0	DNF	0	0	4	7	NE	11
49	(Norway) Fredrik Møller	x	10	DNS	0	0	DNF	0	NE	10
50	(Italy) Giovanni Borsotti	x	0	0	DNS	0	9	DNS	NE	9
51	(Austria) Andreas Ploier	x	DNF	DNS		7	DNF	0	NE	7
52	(Slovenia) Martin Čater	x	5	DNF	DNF	0	DNF	DNS	NE	5
	(Italy) Giovanni Franzoni	x	0	0	DNS	0	5	DNS	NE	5
	(United States) Wiley Maple	x	DNS	DNF	DNS	5	0	DNF	NE	5
55	(Canada) Riley Seger	x	0	DNF	DNF	4	0	0	NE	4
56	(France) Sam Alphand	x	DNS					3	NE	3
	(Canada) Brodie Seger	x	0	0	0	3	DNF	0	NE	3
58	(France) Adrien Fresquet	x	DNS			0	0	2	NE	2
	(Switzerland) Lars Rösti	x	DNS					2	NE	2
	(Italy) Florian Schieder	x	0	0	2	DNS			NE	2
61	(Canada) Kyle Alexander	x	0	DNS	0	0	1	0	NE	1
	(France) Matthieu Bailet	x	0	1	DNF	0	0	0	NE	1
	References									

=== Legend ===
- Winner (100 points)
- 2nd place (80 points)
- 3rd place (60 points)
- DNF = Did not finish
- DSQ = Disqualified
- Did not start (DNS)
- Not eligible for finals (NE)
- Race canceled (x)
- Updated at 22 March 2024, after all events.

== See also ==
- 2024 Alpine Skiing World Cup – Men's summary rankings
- 2024 Alpine Skiing World Cup – Men's overall
- 2024 Alpine Skiing World Cup – Men's downhill
- 2024 Alpine Skiing World Cup – Men's giant slalom
- 2024 Alpine Skiing World Cup – Men's slalom
- World Cup scoring system
