= Marco Schwarz =

Austrian alpine skier (born 1995)

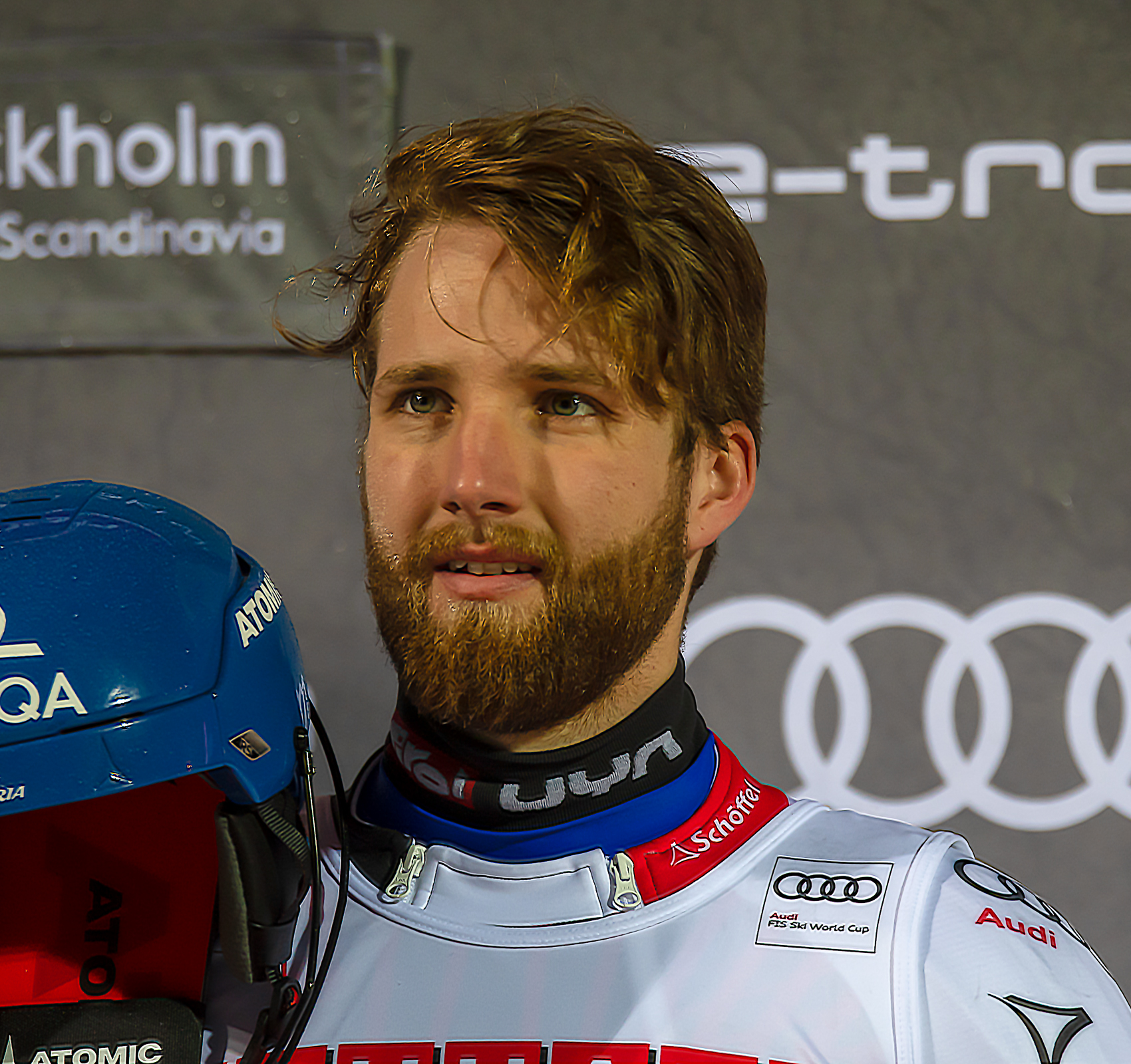
- At Stockholm in 2019

Personal information
- Born: 16 August 1995 (age 30) Villach, Carinthia, Austria
- Height: 1.85 m (6 ft 1 in)

Skiing career
- Country: Austria
- Sport: Alpine skiing
- Club: SC Bad Kleinkirchheim
- Disciplines: Slalom, Giant slalom, Super-G, Combined
- World Cup debut: 16 November 2014 (age 19)

Olympics
- Teams: 3 – (2018, 2022, 2026)
- Medals: 1 (0 gold)

World Championships
- Teams: 5 – (2017–2025)
- Medals: 7 (1 gold)

World Cup
- Seasons: 12 – (2015–2026)
- Wins: 8 – (3 SL, 2 GS, 1 SG, 1 PS, 1 AC)
- Podiums: 26 – (14 SL, 7 GS, 2 SG, 2 PS, 1 AC)
- Overall titles: 0 – (3rd in 2021)
- Discipline titles: 1 – (SL, 2021)
Medal record
Men's alpine skiing
Representing Austria
World Cup race podiums
Event	1st	2nd	3rd
Slalom	3	4	7
Giant slalom	2	4	1
Super-G	1	1	0
Parallel slalom	1	0	1
Combined	1	0	0
Total	8	9	9
International alpine ski competitions
Event	1st	2nd	3rd
Olympic Games	0	1	0
World Championships	1	2	4
Total	1	3	4
Olympic Games
Silver medal – second place	2018 Pyeongchang	Team event
World Championships
Gold medal – first place	2021 Cortina d'Ampezzo	Combined
Silver medal – second place	2019 Åre	Team event
Silver medal – second place	2023 Courchevel	Combined
Bronze medal – third place	2019 Åre	Slalom
Bronze medal – third place	2019 Åre	Combined
Bronze medal – third place	2021 Cortina d'Ampezzo	Giant slalom
Bronze medal – third place	2023 Courchevel	Giant slalom

Marco Schwarz (born 16 August 1995) is an Austrian World Cup alpine ski racer. He focuses on the technical events of slalom and giant slalom, as well as the combined (a mixture of speed and technical disciplines).

== Career ==
Schwarz competed for Austria at the 2012 Winter Youth Olympics in the alpine skiing and won three gold medals; in the boys' combined, the parallel mixed team event, and the boys' giant slalom.

Schwarz made his World Cup debut in November 2014 at age 19. He achieved his first World Cup podium in December 2015; third place in a slalom at Madonna di Campiglio, Italy, behind winner Henrik Kristoffersen and runner-up Marcel Hirscher.

== World Cup results ==
=== Season titles ===
- 1 title – (1 SL)

Season	Discipline
2021	Slalom

=== Season standings ===
Season
Season	Age	Overall	Slalom	Giant slalom	Super-G	Downhill	Combined
2016	20	34	8	48	—	—	—
2017	21	61	20	—	—	—	—
2018	22	39	16	49	—	—	23
2019	23	9	7	31	—	—	2
2020	24	18	7	18	—	—	20
2021	25	3	1	18	—	—	—N/a
2022	26	22	12	20	—	—	—N/a
2023	27	7	13	4	13	31	—N/a
2024	28	11	15	12	28	42	—N/a
2025	29	37	28	17	—	—	—N/a
2026	30	11	27	5	10	59	—N/a

=== Race victories ===
- 8 wins – (3 SL, 2 GS, 1 SG, 1 PS, 1 AC)
- 26 podiums – (14 SL, 7 GS, 2 SG, 2 PS, 1 AC)

Season
Season	Date	Location	Discipline
2019	1 January 2019	Oslo, Norway	Parallel slalom
2019	18 January 2019	Wengen, Switzerland	Combined
2021	10 January 2021	Adelboden, Switzerland	Slalom
2021	26 January 2021	Schladming, Austria	Slalom
2023	25 February 2023	Palisades Tahoe, United States	Giant slalom
2024	22 December 2023	Madonna di Campiglio, Italy	Slalom
2026	21 December 2025	Alta Badia, Italy	Giant slalom
2026	27 December 2025	Livigno, Italy	Super-G

== World Championship results ==
Year
Year	Age	Slalom	Giant slalom	Super-G	Downhill	Combined	Team combined	Parallel	Team event
2017	21	7	—	—	—	—	—N/a	—N/a	—
2019	23	3	5	—	—	3	—N/a	—N/a	2
2021	25	DNF2	3	—	—	1	—N/a	18	—
2023	27	6	3	6	4	2	—N/a	—	—
2025	29	DNF1	5	—	—	—N/a	DNF2	—N/a	—

== Olympic results ==
Year
Year	Age	Slalom	Giant slalom	Super-G	Downhill	Combined	Team combined	Team event
2018	22	11	—	—	—	4	—N/a	2
2022	26	17	14	—	—	5	—N/a	—
2026	30	10	9	14	—	—N/a	11	—N/a
