= List of FIS Alpine Ski World Cup Nations Cup standings =

Statistics on the Alpine Ski World Cup

This is a list of the Nations Cup standings in FIS Alpine Ski World Cup from 1967 to present.

== Standings ==
The Nations Cup standings are calculated by adding up all points each season for all racers from a given nation.

Year	Standings (total)			Standings (men)			Standings (women)		
Year	First	Second	Third	First	Second	Third	First	Second	Third
1967	France	Austria	Canada	France	Austria	Switzerland	France	Austria	Canada
1968	France	Austria	Switzerland	Austria	France	Switzerland	France	Austria	United States
1969	Austria	France	United States	Austria	France	Switzerland	France	United States	Austria
1970	France	Austria	United States	France	Austria	Switzerland	France	United States	Austria
1971	France	Austria	Switzerland	France	Switzerland	Austria	France	Austria	United States
1972	France	Austria	Switzerland	Switzerland	France	Italy	France	Austria	United States
1973	Austria	France	Switzerland	Austria	Italy	Switzerland	Austria	France	West Germany
1974	Austria	Italy	Switzerland	Italy	Austria	Switzerland	Austria	West Germany	France
1975	Austria	Italy	Switzerland	Italy	Austria	Switzerland	Austria	Switzerland	West Germany
1976	Austria	Switzerland	Italy	Italy	Austria	Switzerland	Austria	West Germany	Switzerland
1977	Austria	Switzerland	Italy	Austria	Switzerland	Italy	Austria	Switzerland	France
1978	Austria	Switzerland	United States	Austria	Italy	Sweden	Austria	Switzerland	West Germany
1979	Austria	Switzerland	Italy	Austria	Switzerland	Italy	Austria	West Germany	United States
1980	Austria	Switzerland	Liechtenstein	Austria	Switzerland	Sweden	Switzerland and Austria		Liechtenstein
1981	Switzerland	United States	Austria	Austria	Switzerland	United States	Switzerland	United States	West Germany
1982	Switzerland	Austria	United States	Austria	Switzerland	United States	West Germany	Switzerland	United States
1983	Switzerland	Austria	United States	Switzerland	Austria	Sweden	Switzerland	Austria	United States
1984	Switzerland	Austria	United States	Austria	Switzerland	Sweden	Switzerland	United States	Austria
1985	Switzerland	Austria	West Germany	Switzerland	Austria	Italy	Switzerland	West Germany	Austria
1986	Switzerland	Austria	West Germany	Austria	Switzerland	Italy	Switzerland	Austria	West Germany
1987	Switzerland	Austria	West Germany	Switzerland	Austria	Italy	Switzerland	Austria	West Germany
1988	Austria	Switzerland	West Germany	Austria	Switzerland	Italy	Switzerland	Austria	West Germany
1989	Austria	Switzerland	West Germany	Austria	Switzerland	West Germany	Switzerland	Austria	France
1990	Austria	Switzerland	West Germany	Austria	Switzerland	Italy	Austria	Switzerland	West Germany
1991	Austria	Switzerland	Germany	Austria	Switzerland	Norway	Austria	Switzerland	Germany
1992	Austria	Switzerland	Germany	Switzerland	Austria	Italy	Austria	Germany	Switzerland
1993	Austria	Switzerland	Germany	Austria	Switzerland	Norway	Austria	Germany	Switzerland
1994	Austria	Switzerland	Italy	Austria	Norway	Switzerland	Germany	Austria	Switzerland
1995	Austria	Switzerland	Italy	Austria	Italy	Norway	Switzerland	Germany	Austria
1996	Austria	Switzerland	Italy	Austria	Switzerland	Italy	Austria	Germany	Switzerland
1997	Austria	Italy	Switzerland	Austria	Italy	Norway	Germany	Austria	Italy
1998	Austria	Germany	Italy	Austria	Switzerland	Norway	Germany	Austria	Italy
1999	Austria	Norway	Switzerland	Austria	Norway	Switzerland	Austria	Germany	France
2000	Austria	Italy	Switzerland	Austria	Switzerland	Norway	Austria	France	Italy
2001	Austria	Switzerland	France	Austria	Switzerland	Norway	Austria	France	Switzerland
2002	Austria	Switzerland	Italy	Austria	Switzerland	France	Austria	Switzerland	Italy
2003	Austria	Switzerland	United States	Austria	Switzerland	United States	Austria	Italy	Germany
2004	Austria	Italy	United States	Austria	Italy	Switzerland	Austria	Germany	United States
2005	Austria	United States	Italy	Austria	United States	Italy	Austria	United States	Germany
2006	Austria	United States	Italy	Austria	United States	Italy	Austria	Sweden	United States
2007	Austria	Switzerland	United States	Austria	Switzerland	Italy	Austria	United States	Sweden
2008	Austria	Switzerland	Italy	Austria	Switzerland	Italy	Austria	United States	Italy
2009	Austria	Switzerland	Italy	Austria	Switzerland	Italy	Austria	Switzerland	Germany
2010	Austria	Switzerland	Italy	Austria	Switzerland	Italy	Austria	Germany	Switzerland
2011	Austria	Switzerland	Italy	Austria	Switzerland	Italy	Austria	Germany	United States
2012	Austria	Italy	Switzerland	Austria	Switzerland	Italy	Austria	United States	Italy
2013	Austria	Italy	United States	Austria	Italy	France	Austria	United States	Germany
2014	Austria	Switzerland	Italy	Austria	France	Italy	Austria	Switzerland	Sweden
2015	Austria	Italy	Switzerland	Austria	France	Italy	Austria	United States	Italy
2016	Austria	Italy	France	Austria	France	Norway	Austria	Italy	Switzerland
2017	Austria	Italy	Switzerland	Austria	France	Norway	Italy	Austria	Switzerland
2018	Austria	Switzerland	Italy	Austria	Norway	Switzerland	Austria	Switzerland	Italy
2019	Austria	Switzerland	Norway	Austria	Switzerland	France	Austria	Switzerland	Italy
2020	Switzerland	Austria	Italy	Switzerland	Norway	France	Italy	Austria	Switzerland
2021	Switzerland	Austria	Italy	Switzerland	Austria	France	Switzerland	Austria	Italy
2022	Austria	Switzerland	Italy	Switzerland	Austria	Norway	Austria	Switzerland	Italy
2023	Switzerland	Austria	Norway	Switzerland	Norway	Austria	Switzerland	Italy	Austria
2024	Switzerland	Austria	Italy	Switzerland	Austria	Norway	Austria	Switzerland	Italy
2025	Switzerland	Austria	Italy	Switzerland	Austria	Norway	Italy	Switzerland	Austria
2026	Switzerland	Austria	Italy	Switzerland	Austria	Norway	United States	Austria	Italy

The early years of the World Cup, ‘67 through ‘72, were dominated by the French, as reflected in their Nations Cup wins in 5 of the first 6 years. The Austrian team then took over throughout the rest of the 1970s, followed by Swiss superiority during most of the 1980s. A resurgent Austrian team charged back to the top in 1988, beginning a long streak of consecutive Nations Cup triumphs. Austrian dominance reached its zenith in the late 1990s and 2000s (decade), when their points total regularly doubled that of the second-place finisher, and was capped in the 1999–2000 and 2003–4 seasons with totals that tripled those of runner-up Italy. Their 17927-point total in 1999–2000 is a Nations Cup record, as is their 12066-point margin of victory in 2003–4.

As of the end of the 2016–17 season, the Austrian team has won 30 consecutive Nations Cups, while topping the men's standings for 25 straight years. Austria is the only nation to have finished in the top 3 of the Nations Cup standings in all 50 years in which World Cup competition has been held, winning in 38 of those years, runner-up in 11 years, and third place in a single year. Austrian men have failed to make the podium in only one season: 1972. Austrian women have failed to make the podium in only 2 seasons: 1981 and 1982. Switzerland with 10 wins and France with 5 wins are the only other nations to have won the nations cup. In the midst of the ongoing Austrian juggernaut, the Swiss or Italian teams have usually held second place. The German team reached the runner-up spot for the first time in 1997–8, as did the Norwegians the next season. The US enjoyed its best placings ever starting in 2004–5, grabbing second in the Nations Cup for two straight years.

Under the current scoring system (since 1992), the winning nation (Austria every year) has averaged over 13000 points, with an average of over 6400 for the runner-up, 5400 for third place, 4200 for fifth, and 1300 for tenth. The all-inclusive scoring system (simply adding together all World Cup points earned) favors national teams with great depth and many racers scoring World Cup points, and even teams with several top racers have no realistic chance of breaking the Austrian grip on the top spot, while a team with only one or two top-ranked racers will struggle to ever break the top five in the standings. There have been numerous calls for a revamped scoring system which would allow other nations to compete more readily for top spots in the Nations Cup, but no changes are likely to be made. In 2016, however, the Austrian men's team narrowly beat France by just 201 points.

The total number of top-three placings for each nation in the Nations Cup (through the 2023–24 season) are summarized below:

Nation	Total standings			Men's standings			Ladies' standings		
Nation	First	Second	Third	First	Second	Third	First	Second	Third
Austria	42	17	1	42	12	2	35	16	8
Switzerland	13	26	12	12	26	12	11	16	10
France	5	2	2	3	7	5	6	3	4
Italy	–	10	22	3	6	20	4	3	13
United States	–	3	10	–	2	3	1	10	9
Germany	–	1	9	–	–	1	4	12	13
Norway	–	1	2	–	5	13	–	–	–
Canada	–	–	1	–	–	–	–	–	1
Liechtenstein	–	–	1	–	–	–	–	–	1
Sweden	–	–	–	–	–	4	–	1	2

Note: Results for West Germany and Germany are counted together in this table.
