= 2024 Alpine Skiing World Cup – Men's downhill =

Alpine ski discipline year standings

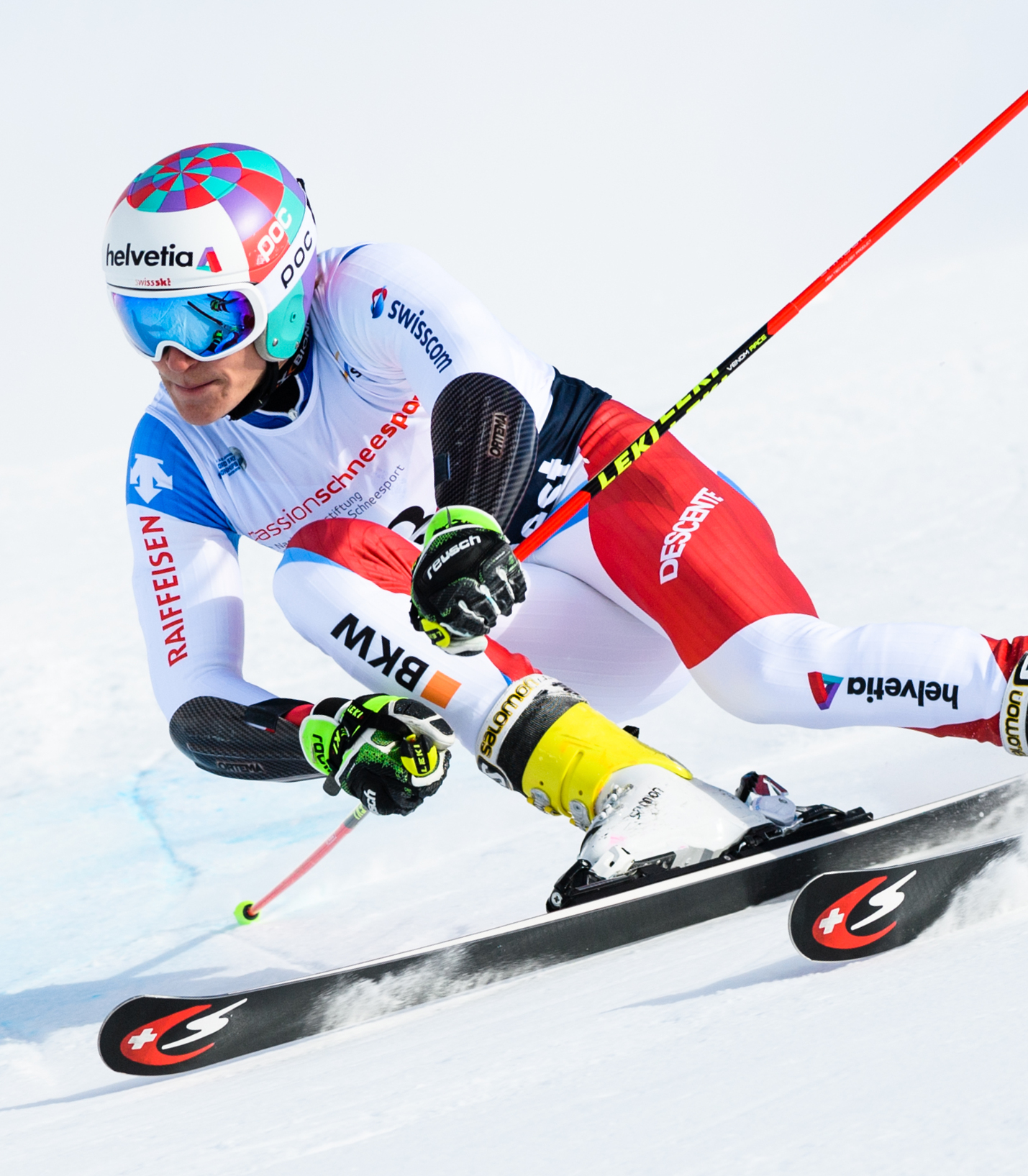
2024 Men's Downhill World Cup: Marco Odermatt of Switzerland, season champion; 2024 Men's World Cup; Overall • Downhill • Super-G; Giant slalom • Slalom
Previous: 2023	Next: 2025

The men's downhill in the 2024 FIS Alpine Skiing World Cup consisted of eight events. The season had been planned with thirteen downhills, but two scheduled downhills on 11/12 November 2023 on the Matterhorn, running from Switzerland (Zermatt) into Italy (Cervinia), were canceled for the second straight year, this time due to heavy snowfall and high winds (unlike the year before, when the cancellation was due to lack of snow), and only one has been rescheduled (at Val Gardena on 12 December). The two downhill races after that, scheduled in the U.S. at Beaver Creek, Colorado, were also cancelled for the same reason, although they still may be rescheduled—meaning that the downhill season had not completed a race as of early December despite having had four scheduled, with the next attempt being the rescheduled race at Val Gardena/Gröden. One of the Beaver Creek races was rescheduled at Wengen on 11 January 2024. As described in the season summary, two February downhills at Chamonix, France were cancelled later in the season, reducing the total races in the discipline to nine. In the last race of the World Cup season, the final was also cancelled, meaning that seven men's downhills were cancelled during the season and only two of those were rescheduled.

== Season summary ==
After the cancellations, the season began with the make-up at Val Gardena/Grõden, which was won (in a huge upset) by American Bryce Bennett (who did not start in the top 30), edging out two-time defending discipline champion Aleksander Aamodt Kilde from Norway and two-time overall champion Marco Odermatt from Switzerland. In the next race, on the Stelvio in Bormio, overall World Cup leader Marco Schwarz of Austria suffered a season-ending knee injury, and Switzerland's Marco Odermatt, who finished second, took over first place in the discipline for the season. The season then became a battle between Odermatt and French skier Cyprien Sarrazin, who won both of the downhills in Kitzbühel, Austria to move into second, just six points behind Odermatt, who had previously won the two downhills in Wengen, Switzerland.

However, just when a French skier moved into contention for the discipline title, the upcoming two races in France (at Chamonix, 2-3 February) had to be cancelled due to a lack of snow and a too-warm forecast, which left just two more downhills on the discipline schedule for the season -- one in Norway in February, and then the season finals in March. And then Sarrazin was injured during training and had to miss the downhill in Kvitfjell, Norway, which was won by Niels Hintermann of Switzerland, while his teammate Odermatt finished seventh and opened a 42-point lead over Sarrazin with just the season finals remaining.

== Finals ==
The season final was scheduled to take place on 24 March at Saalbach-Hinterglemm, Austria. For the first time since the finals began in 1993, the downhill was the last event of the finals instead of the first, with the women's race being held on Saturday and the men's on Sunday. Only the top 25 in the downhill standings and the downhill gold medalist at the Junior World Championships (Livio Hiltbrand of Switzerland) were eligible to compete in the downhill finals, with the exception that any skier who has earned at least 500 points in the overall standings was eligible to compete in any discipline, regardless of his standing in the downhill for the season. Due to the reduced field, only the top 15 earned points. Because Hiltbrand was competing in (and winning, despite starting the final in fifth place) the European Cup downhill season championship this week, he and the injured Kilde and Florian Schieder of Italy did not enter finals, while one 500-point skier (Loïc Meillard) did, setting the race field at 25.

However, on race day heavy snow and wind caused the final to be delayed by two hours and then cancelled (and not postponed, as it was scheduled for the same day as the season-ending ceremonies). Accordingly, Odermatt, who was leading by 42 points, won the season crown, giving him the overall title and three discipline titles for the season.

== Standings ==
	Venue	11 Nov 2023; Zermatt/Cervinia	12 Nov 2022; Zermatt/Cervinia	1 Dec 2023; Beaver Creek	2 Dec 2023; Beaver Creek	14 Dec 2023; Val Gardena/Gröden	16 Dec 2023; Val Gardena/Gröden	28 Dec 2023; Bormio	11 Jan 2024; Wengen	13 Jan 2024; Wengen	19 Jan 2024; Kitzbühel	20 Jan 2024; Kitzbühel	2 Feb 2024; Chamonix	3 Feb 2024; Chamonix	17 Feb 2024; Kvitfjell	24 Mar 2024; Saalbach	
#	Skier	(Switzerland) (Italy)	(Switzerland) (Italy)	(United States)	(United States)	(Italy)	(Italy)	(Italy)	(Switzerland)	(Switzerland)	(Austria)	(Austria)	(France)	(France)	(Norway)	(Austria)	Total
	(Switzerland) Marco Odermatt	x		x		60	36	80	100	100	60	80	x		36	x	552
2	(France) Cyprien Sarrazin	x		x		DNF	50	100	80	80	100	100	x		DNS	x	510
3	(Italy) Dominik Paris	x		x		24	100	0	45	60	40	60	x		13	x	342
4	(Austria) Vincent Kriechmayr	x		x		14	18	45	20	45	36	40	x		80	x	298
5	(United States) Bryce Bennett	x		x		100	60	0	15	26	6	0	x		50	x	257
6	(Switzerland) Niels Hintermann	x		x		5	26	36	24	32	DNF	6	x		100	x	229
7	(Norway) Aleksander Aamodt Kilde	x		x		80	80	DNF	60	DNF	DNS						220
8	(United States) Ryan Cochran-Siegle	x		x		18	20	0	40	29	50	15	x		36	x	208
9	(Canada) Cameron Alexander	x		x		26	DNF	60	7	DNF	45	7	x		60	x	205
10	(France) Nils Allègre	x		x		50	40	6	14	36	26	29	x		DNF	x	201
11	(Italy) Florian Schieder	x		x		16	14	18	50	DNF	80	16	x		0	DNS	194
12	(Italy) Mattia Casse	x		x		22	36	40	36	26	0	20	x		5	x	185
13	(Canada) James Crawford	x		x		45	45	32	0	10	8	4	x		8	x	152
14	(Switzerland) Justin Murisier	x		x		0	7	50	26	DNF	32	9	x		15	x	139
15	(Austria) Stefan Babinsky	x		x		40	0	0	16	0	0	50	x		3	x	109
16	(Switzerland) Stefan Rogentin	x		x		10	8	5	9	20	16	26	x		10	x	104
17	(Switzerland) Franjo von Allmen	x		x		0	22	0	18	18	0	DNF	x		45	x	103
18	(France) Maxence Muzaton	x		x		8	15	0	11	DNF	22	45	x		DNS	x	101
19	(France) Blaise Giezendanner	x		x		2	0	15	0	13	10	36	x		24	x	100
20	(Switzerland) Alexis Monney	x		x		0	0	20	22	9	11	32	x		5	x	99
21	(France) Matthieu Bailet	x		x		36	DNF	9	5	DNF	20	13	x		0	x	83
22	(Slovenia) Miha Hrobat	x		x		6	9	24	DNF	5	2	10	x		24	x	80
23	(France) Adrien Théaux	x		x		5	4	15	6	40	8	1	x		0	x	79
24	(Austria) Otmar Striedinger	x		x		0	14	0	32	22	10	0	x		0	x	78
25	(Italy) Guglielmo Bosca	x		x		12	0	1	0	8	14	20	x		18	x	73
	(Finland) Elian Lehto	x		x		9	2	3	0	11	24	24	x		0	x	73
27	(United States) Jared Goldberg	x		x		13	24	4	DNF	15	0	DNF	x		14	NE	70
28	(Italy) Christof Innerhofer	x		x		22	10	2	13	12	0	0	x		10	NE	69
29	(France) Nils Alphand	x		x		0	16	29	0	0	0	DNF	x		20	NE	65
	(Norway) Adrian Smiseth Sejersted	x		x		0	0	DNS	2	50	13	DNF	x		DNS	NE	65
31	(United States) Sam Morse	x		x		0	0	0	1	6	12	14	x		26	NE	59
32	(Switzerland) Marco Kohler	x		x		32	0	26	DNF	DNS						NE	58
33	(Switzerland) Arnaud Boisset	x		x		DNS	0	9	DNS	DNF	29	11	x		7	NE	56
	(Austria) Daniel Danklmaier	x		x		0	0	11	8	14	DNF	5	x		18	NE	56
35	(Canada) Jeffrey Read	x		x		8	0	0	0	0	4	DNF	x		40	NE	52
36	(Germany) Andreas Sander	x		x		0	12	12	10	3	0	8	x		1	NE	46
37	(Germany) Romed Baumann	x		x		29	3	DNF	13	0	0	0	x		0	NE	45
	(Switzerland) Josua Mettler	x		x		0	0	DNS	0	16	0	DNF	x		29	NE	45
39	(France) Alexis Pinturault	x		x		DNS		9	29	DNS						NE	38
40	(United States) Wiley Maple	x		x		DNS		22	0	DNF	0	0	x		12	NE	34
41	(Germany) Simon Jocher	x		x		DNF	0	10	4	0	16	3	x		0	NE	33
42	(Austria) Marco Schwarz	x		x		0	29	DNF	DNS							NE	29
43	(Austria) Daniel Hemetsberger	x		x		3	11	0	0	DNS	0	12	x		DNS	NE	26
	(Austria) Christopher Neumayer	x		x		DNF	0	DNS			4	22	x		DNS	NE	26
45	(Austria) Raphael Haaser	x		x		DNS		18	0	DNS	5	0	x		0	NE	23
46	(Germany) Josef Ferstl	x		x		16	6	0	0	0	0	0	x		DNS	NE	22
	(Italy) Pietro Zazzi	x		x		0	0	13	0	2	1	DNF	x		6	NE	22
48	(Germany) Dominik Schwaiger	x		x		DNS			0	0	18	0	x		0	NE	18
49	(United States) Kyle Negomir	x		x		0	1	0	0	0	0	DNS	x		12	NE	13
50	(Czech Republic) Jan Zabystřan	x		x		11	0	0	0	DNS			x		0	NE	11
51	(Germany) Thomas Dreßen	x		x		0	5	DNS	3	0	DNS	0	x		DNS	NE	8
52	(Switzerland) Lars Rösti	x		x		0	DNS	0	0	7	0	DNS				NE	7
53	(Canada) Brodie Seger	x		x		0	0	0	0	0	0	3	x		2	NE	5
54	(Switzerland) Gilles Roulin	x		x		0	0	0	0	4	DNS	0	x		0	NE	4
55	(Slovenia) Martin Čater	x		x		1	0	0	0	DNF	0	DNF	x		0	NE	1
	(Norway) Fredrik Møller	x		x		DNS			0	DNS			x		1	NE	1
	(Germany) Luis Vogt	x		x		DNS			0	1	0	0	x		DNS	NE	1
	References																

=== Legend ===
- Winner (100 points)
- 2nd place (80 points)
- 3rd place (60 points)
- DNF = Did not finish
- DSQ = Disqualified
- Did not start (DNS)
- Not eligible for finals (NE)
- Race canceled (x)
- Updated at 24 March 2024, after all events.

== See also ==
- 2024 Alpine Skiing World Cup – Men's summary rankings
- 2024 Alpine Skiing World Cup – Men's overall
- 2024 Alpine Skiing World Cup – Men's super-G
- 2024 Alpine Skiing World Cup – Men's giant slalom
- 2024 Alpine Skiing World Cup – Men's slalom
- World Cup scoring system
