= Norway national alpine ski team =

Norway
- National federation: Norwegian Ski Federation
- Coach: Christian Mitter (men); Ole Morten Iversen (women)

Olympic Games
- Appearances: 24
- Medals: 40

World Championships
- Appearances: 46
- Medals: 62
Medal record
Alpine skiing
Event	1st	2nd	3rd
Winter Olympics	11	14	15
World Championships	25	20	17
Total	36	34	32

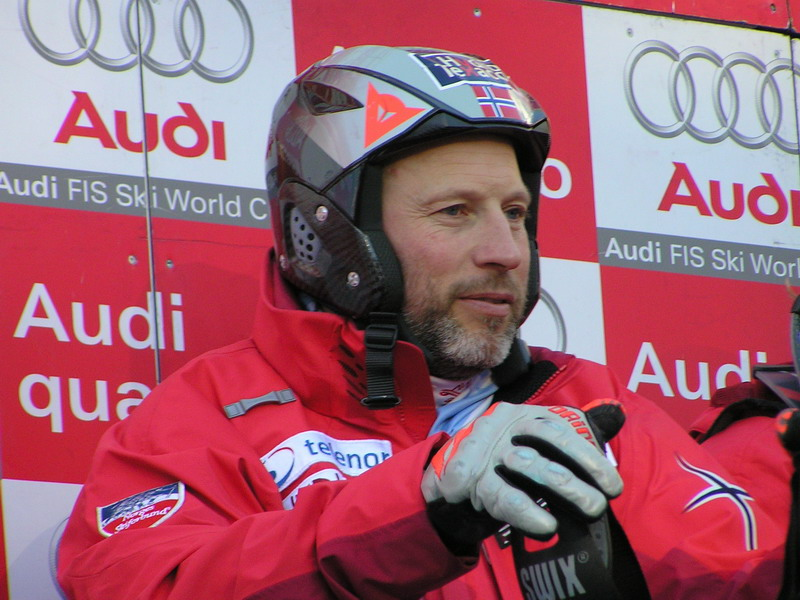
Lasse Kjus, like Svindall, is the Norwegian skier who has won twice overall World Cup, in 1996 and 1999.

The Norway national alpine ski team represents Norway in International alpine skiing competitions such as Winter Olympic Games, FIS Alpine Ski World Cup and FIS Alpine World Ski Championships.

== World Cup ==
Norwegian alpine skiers won six overall FIS Alpine Ski World Cup with men and none with women.

=== Men titles ===
Still active

Skier	Overall	Downhill	Super G	Giant slalom	Slalom	Combined	Total
Aksel Lund Svindal	2	2	5	1	-	1	11
Kjetil André Aamodt	1	-	1	1	1	-	4
Aleksander Aamodt Kilde	1	1	2	-	-	-	4
Kjetil Jansrud	-	1	3	-	-	-	4
Henrik Kristoffersen	-	-	-	1	3	-	4
Lasse Kjus	2	1	-	-	-	-	3
Ole Kristian Furuseth	-	-	-	2	-	-	2
Atle Skårdal	-	-	1	-	-	-	1
Jan Einar Thorsen	-	-	1	-	-	-	1
	6	5	13	5	4	1	34

== See also ==
- Norway at the Olympics
- Norwegian Ski Federation
