= Wiley Maple =

American alpine skier

Personal information
- Born: May 25, 1990 (age 36) Aspen, Colorado, United States
- Height: 6 ft 2 in (188 cm)
- Website: wileymaple.com

Skiing career
- Sport: Alpine skiing
- Club: Aspen Valley Ski and Snowboard Club
- Retired: 2019
- Disciplines: Downhill, Super-G
- World Cup debut: 15 January 2011 (age 20)

Olympics
- Teams: 1 – (2018)
- Medals: 0 (0 gold)

World Championships
- Teams: 0

World Cup
- Seasons: 6
- Wins: 0
- Podiums: 0
- Overall titles: 0
- Discipline titles: 0

Wiley Maple (born May 25, 1990) is a current (2023/2024 season) World Cup alpine ski racer from the United States, born and raised in Aspen, Colorado. He competed primarily in the speed events, downhill and super-G.

Maple paid his own way to the 2018 Winter Olympics, as he was not actually named to the U.S Olympic team. He competed in the men's downhill event.
