= 2024 Alpine Skiing World Cup – Men's slalom =

Alpine ski discipline year standings

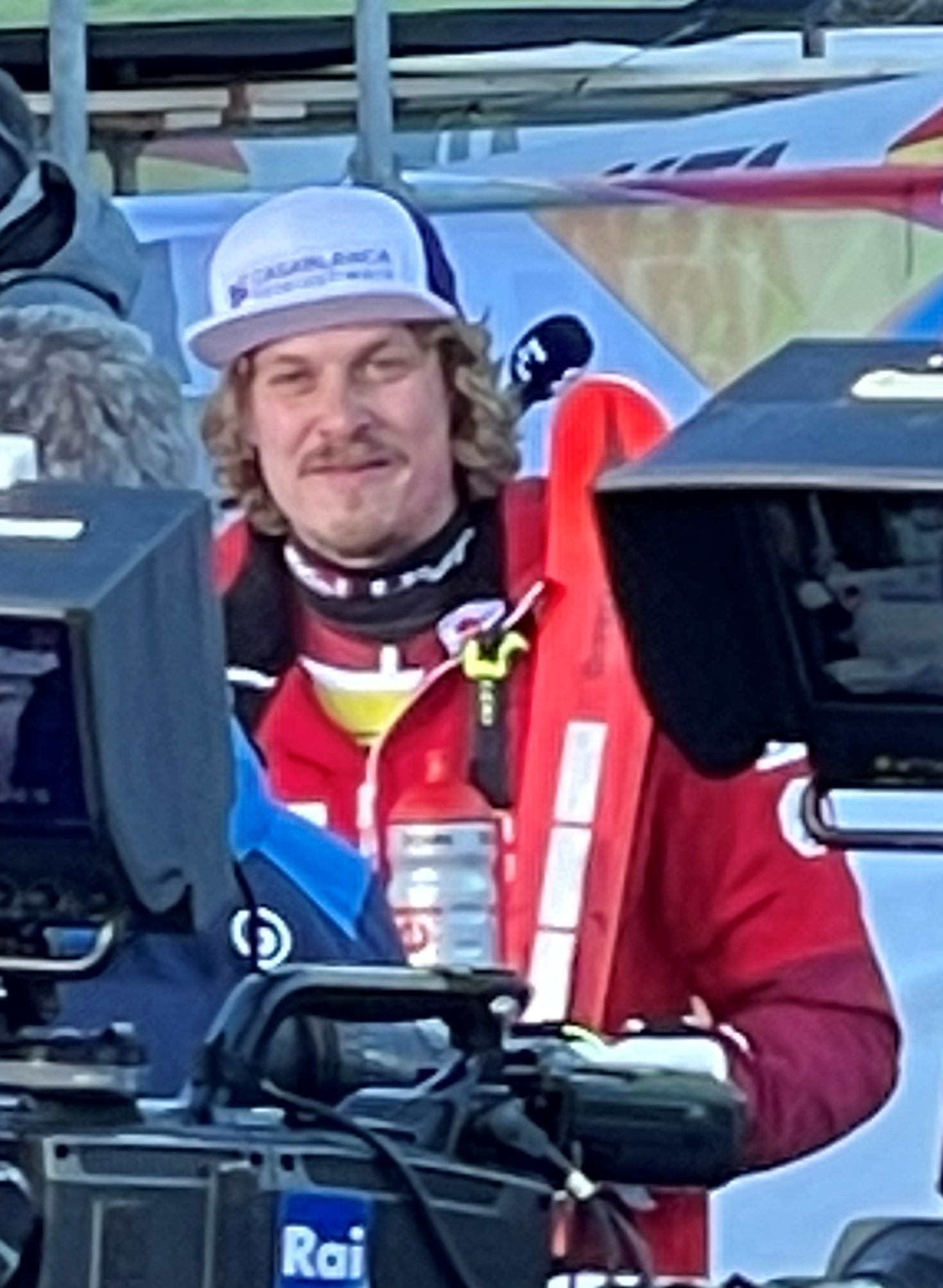
2024 Men's Slalom World Cup: Manuel Feller of Austria, season champion; 2024 Men's World Cup; Overall • Downhill • Super-G; Giant slalom • Slalom
Previous: 2023	Next: 2025

The men's slalom in the 2024 FIS Alpine Skiing World Cup consisted of ten events, including the discipline final. Due to three prior cancellations in other disciplines, the first men's race of the entire season was the slalom held at Gurgl, Austria on 18 November 2023. The original season schedule called for 13 events, but during the season (as discussed below) three slaloms were canceled and not rescheduled. In an upset, Manuel Feller of Austria won his first career discipline title.

== Season summary ==
On 27 October 2023, two days before the scheduled opening of the men's World Cup season, Lucas Braathen, the 23-year-old Norwegian who was the defending champion in the slalom discipline, announced his retirement from professional Alpine skiing, as part of a dispute with the Norwegian ski federation over his individual commercial rights. The surprising aftermath of that decision was an Austrian podium sweep in Gurgl, the first race of the season, with Manuel Feller defeating Marco Schwarz and Michael Matt. The Austrian victory ended a streak of 17 slaloms without an Austrian victory, dating back to January 2022. However, the next scheduled race, in Val d'Isère on 10 December, was canceled due to a mix of overnight rain followed by new snow and high winds. When the second race was finally held in Madonna di Campiglio, Marco Schwarz won it, coming from sixth after the first run, and took over the season lead in both the discipline and the overall men's World Cup. By the next slalom, Schwarz had suffered a season-ending injury, but Feller won by .02 seconds to maintain the Austrian domination and also regain the overall lead for the season.

In the next two slaloms, at the downhill/slalom festivals in Wengen (SUI) and Kitzbühel (AUT), Feller won and then finished fourth (behind German Linus Straßer, who grew up and learned to ski at Kitzbühel), opening up an almost 200-point lead in the discipline. Straßer also won the night slalom at Schlamding, less than 100 miles away, four days later to move into second overall in the discipline for the season.

The next race, held in poor snow conditions in Chamonix, France after two prior races had already been canceled due to warm temperatures, featured a history-making comeback by Swiss slalom specialist Daniel Yule. Yule made a huge blunder on the first run and was the last of the 30 racers who qualified for the second run, meaning that he would start first, almost two seconds behind the leader; however, he put down a great second run and then sat in the leader's chair as all 29 remaining racers came down the increasingly melting and rutted course, with only two (his countryman Loïc Meillard and first-run leader Clément Noël of France) even managing to get within 0.3 of his total time, thus making Yule the first World Cup men's slalom skier ever to advance from 30th after the first run to 1st after the second run..The race in Bansko the next week was then canceled after 31 skiers had completed the first run, because visibility was compromised by fog while the course had deteriorated due to persistent heavy rain.

The following two races were held in the US, and Feller pulled off a come-from-behind triumph in the first (at Palisades Tahoe) to establish a 204-point lead over Straßer, who dropped from first to third on the second run, with just three races to go. When the slalom scheduled the next weekend in Kranjska Gora was canceled due to heavy rains, Feller clinched the season title over Straßer.

== Finals ==
The World Cup discipline finals took place on Sunday, 17 March 2024, in Saalbach-Hinterglemm, Austria. Only the top 25 in the slalom discipline ranking and the winner of the Junior World Championship were eligible to compete in the final, except that all skiers who have scored at least 500 points in the overall classification were eligible to compete in any discipline. Because of the reduced field size, only the top 15 finishers in the discipline final scored points. In the finals, no skier with at least 500 points who wasn't otherwise eligible chose to compete, and one skier who qualified (Schwarz) was injured, leaving 25 racers at the start.

Since Feller and Straßer had already clinched the top two spots on the discipline podium, the only battle left was for third, and Timon Haugan of Norway jumped out to a big lead after the first run, then held off Feller, Straßer, and Meillard on the second run to claim that podium spot. However, the bigger news was that immediate past champion Lucas Braathen announced his "un-retirement" and return for the 2025 season, but now skiing for Brazil (his mother's homeland) instead of Norway, where he will have full control over his individual commercial rights.

== Standings ==
	Venue	18 Nov 2023; Gurgl	10 Dec 2023; Val d'Isère	22 Dec 2023; Madonna di Campiglio	7 Jan 2024; Adelboden	14 Jan 2024; Wengen	21 Jan 2024; Kitzbühel	24 Jan 2024; Schladming	4 Feb 2024; Chamonix	11 Feb 2024; Bansko	25 Feb 2024; Palisades Tahoe	3 Mar 2024; Aspen	10 Mar 2024; Kranjska Gora	17 Mar 2024; Saalbach	
#	Skier	(Austria)	(France)	(Italy)	(Switzerland)	(Switzerland)	(Austria)	(Austria)	(France)	(Bulgaria)	(United States)	(United States)	(Slovenia)	(Austria)	Total
	(Austria) Manuel Feller	100	x	45	100	100	50	45	50	x	100	45	x	80	715
2	(Germany) Linus Straßer	29	x	29	50	DNF1	100	100	18	x	60	80	x	60	526
3	(Norway) Timon Haugan	40	x	50	29	29	DNF2	80	32	x	50	40	x	100	450
4	(Switzerland) Loïc Meillard	DNF2	x	36	22	45	32	15	80	x	29	100	x	50	409
5	(France) Clément Noël	22	x	80	DNF1	50	DNF2	60	60	x	80	DNF2	x	45	397
6	(Norway) Henrik Kristoffersen	36	x	40	DSQ2	60	10	40	45	x	32	60	x	36	359
7	(United Kingdom) Dave Ryding	50	x	60	10	22	45	18	24	x	7	36	x	16	288
	(Switzerland) Daniel Yule	45	x	DNF2	26	22	60	32	100	x	DNF2	3	x	0	288
9	(Switzerland) Marc Rochat	12	x	8	45	40	26	50	13	x	DNF1	24	x	40	258
10	(Sweden) Kristoffer Jakobsen	24	x	DNF1	DNF1	DNF1	80	36	12	x	45	DNF1	x	20	217
11	(Norway) Atle Lie McGrath	DSQ1	x	32	80	80	DNF1	DNF2	1	x	22	DNF1	x	0	215
12	(Austria) Fabio Gstrein	32	x	22	DNQ	32	DNF1	26	20	x	36	26	x	0	194
13	(France) Steven Amiez	DNQ	x	DNQ	24	24	40	13	29	x	24	29	x	DNF1	183
	(Austria) Johannes Strolz	DNF1	x	15	13	16	16	14	18	x	15	50	x	26	183
15	(Austria) Marco Schwarz	80	x	100	DNS										180
16	(Austria) Dominik Raschner	14	x	11	60	DNF1	36	DNF2	45	x	DNF2	13	x	0	179
17	(Italy) Tommaso Sala	DNQ	x	DNQ	36	14	29	29	5	x	8	15	x	22	158
18	(Italy) Alex Vinatzer	5	x	9	DNF1	5	15	DNF2	26	x	40	13	x	32	145
19	(Switzerland) Luca Aerni	11	x	20	32	DNF1	DNF1	16	9	x	14	18	x	18	138
20	(Croatia) Samuel Kolega	9	x	DNQ	40	15	DNF1	8	36	x	26	DNF1	x	0	134
21	(Austria) Michael Matt	60	x	16	DNF2	36	DSQ1	DNS	12	x	DNQ	5	x	0	129
22	(Norway) Alexander Steen Olsen	13	x	20	DNF2	DNF1	DNF1	24	15	x	DNQ	20	x	24	116
23	(Greece) AJ Ginnis	DNF1	x	26	DNF1	DNF1	18	20	22	x	DNF1	DNF1	x	29	115
24	(Bulgaria) Albert Popov	26	x	24	16	DNF1	DNF1	22	5	x	18	DNF1	x	0	111
25	(Germany) Sebastian Holzmann	16	x	4	20	18	9	12	DNF1	x	DNQ	7	x	DNF2	86
26	(Croatia) Istok Rodeš	DNQ	x	5	14	26	24	DNF1	DNF1	x	DNF1	16	x	NE	85
27	(Switzerland) Ramon Zenhäusern	9	x	14	18	DNF2	DNS	DNF1	14	x	10	DNF1	x	NE	65
28	(Croatia) Filip Zubčić	18	x	DSQ2	DNF1	10	DNF1	DNF2	8	x	20	8	x	NE	64
29	(Switzerland) Tanguy Nef	11	x	12	DNF2	12	DNF1	DNQ	7	x	11	DNF1	x	NE	53
30	(United Kingdom) Billy Major	15	x	DNF1	DNQ	13	20	DNQ	DNQ	x	DNF2	DNF1	x	NE	48
	(Belgium) Armand Marchant	DNF1	x	13	DNQ	DNF1	DSQ2	DNF2	DNQ	x	13	22	x	NE	48
32	(Austria) Adrian Pertl	DNF2	x	DNF1	9	3	15	9	2	x	9	DNF1	x	NE	47
33	(United Kingdom) Laurie Taylor	DNF2	x	DNF1	DNF1	DNF1	12	DNQ	DNQ	x	DNQ	32	x	NE	44
34	(Italy) Tobias Kastlunger	20	x	DNF1	15	7	DNF1	DNF1	DNQ	x	DNF2	DNQ	x	NE	42
35	(Spain) Juan del Campo	7	x	DNQ	DNF1	6	7	DNQ	DNQ	x	DNQ	14	x	NE	34
	(Norway) Sebastian Foss-Solevåg	6	x	DNQ	7	DNQ	DNF1	10	DNQ	x	DNQ	11	x	NE	34
37	(France) Paco Rassat	DNF1	x	DNQ	DNS	9	22	DNF1	DNQ	x	DNQ	DNF1	x	NE	31
38	(Italy) Stefano Gross	DSQ1	x	DNF2	4	4	DNF1	DNQ	10	x	12	DNQ	x	NE	30
39	(Belgium) Sam Maes	DNQ	x	DNF1	DNF1	8	DNF1	11	DNF1	x	6	DNF1	x	NE	25
	(United States) Jett Seymour	DNF1	x	DNF1	DNQ	DNQ	DNQ	DNF2	3	x	16	6	x	NE	25
41	(United States) Benjamin Ritchie	DNF1	x	DNQ	8	11	DNF1	DNF1	DNF1	x	DNF1	4	x	NE	23
42	(Germany) Anton Tremmel	DNF1	x	10	DNF1	DNF1	8	DNQ	DNQ	x	DNQ	DSQ1	x	NE	18
43	(Canada) Erik Read	DNQ	x	6	11	DNQ	DNF1	DNF1	DNQ	x	DNQ	DNQ	x	NE	17
44	(Austria) Joshua Sturm	DNS	x	DNS	DNQ	DNF1	DNQ	DNQ	6	x	DNF2	10	x	NE	16
45	(Norway) Eirik Hystad Solberg	DNS	x	DNS			13	DNQ	DNQ	x	DNS		x	NE	13
46	(United States) River Radamus	DNS	x	DNS	12	DNF1	DNF1	DNQ	DNS	x	DNF1	DNQ	x	NE	12
47	(Sweden) Fabian Ax Swartz	DNF1	x	DNQ	DNQ	DNS	11	DNQ	DNQ	x	DNQ	DNF1	x	NE	11
48	(Austria) Kilian Pramstaller	DNS	x	DNS			DNF1	DNF1	DNS	x	DNQ	9	x	NE	9
49	(France) Hugo Desgrippes	DNF1	x	7	DNF1	DNF1	DNF2	DNQ	DNQ	x	DNQ	DNQ	x	NE	7
50	(Norway) Theodor Brækken	DNQ	x	DNF1	DNS		6	DNQ	DNS	x	DNQ	DNF1	x	NE	6
	(Spain) Joaquim Salarich	DNF1	x	DNF1	6	DNQ	DNF1	DNF1	DNQ	x	DNQ	DNQ	x	NE	6
52	(France) Léo Anguenot	DNS	x	DNS	5	DNQ	DNF1	DNQ	DNQ	x	DNQ	DNF1	x	NE	5
53	(Austria) Simon Rüland	4	x	DNQ	DNQ	DNS			DNQ	DNS			x	NE	4
54	(Japan) Seigo Katō	DNF1	x	DNS	DNF1	2	DNF1	DNQ	DNF1	DNS	DNQ	DNS	x	NE	2
	References														

=== Legend ===
- Winner (100 points)
- 2nd place (80 points)
- 3rd place (60 points)
- DNQ = Did not qualify for run 2
- DNF1 = Did not finish run 1
- DSQ1 = Disqualified run 1
- DNF2 = Did not finish run 2
- DSQ2 = Disqualified run 2
- DNS2 = Did not start run 2
- Did not start (DNS)
- Not eligible for finals (NE)
- Race canceled (x)
- Updated at 17 March 2024, after all events

== See also ==
- 2024 Alpine Skiing World Cup – Men's summary rankings
- 2024 Alpine Skiing World Cup – Men's overall
- 2024 Alpine Skiing World Cup – Men's downhill
- 2024 Alpine Skiing World Cup – Men's super-G
- 2024 Alpine Skiing World Cup – Men's giant slalom
- World Cup scoring system
