= 2024 Alpine Skiing World Cup – Men's giant slalom =

Alpine ski discipline year standings

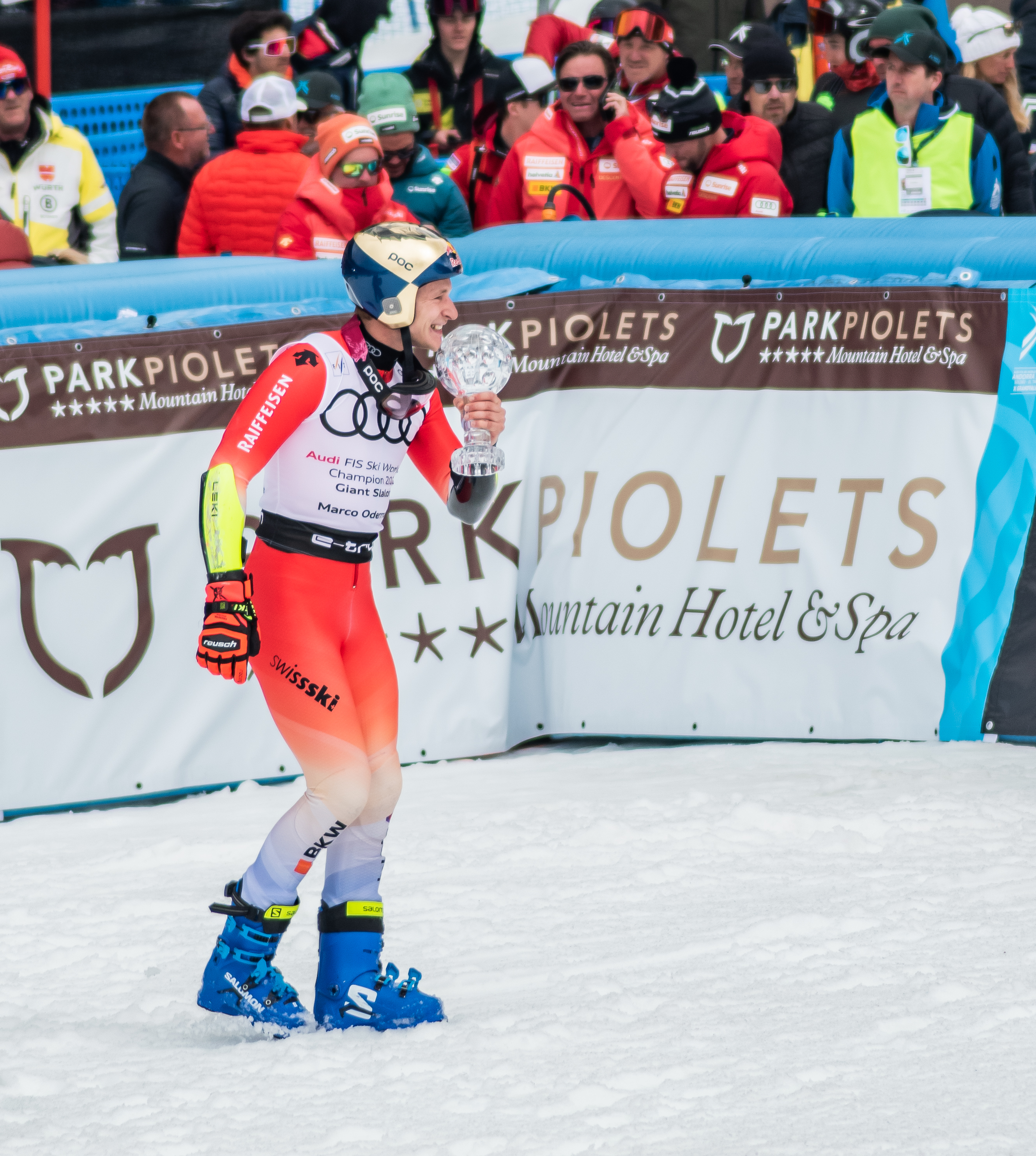
2024 Men's Giant slalom World Cup: Switzerland's Marco Odermatt, third consecutive championship; 2024 Men's World Cup; Overall • Downhill • Super-G; Giant slalom • Slalom
| Previous: 2023 | Next: 2025 |

The men's giant slalom in the 2024 FIS Alpine Skiing World Cup consisted of ten events, including the final. The original schedule included 12 events, but two were canceled during the season. Switzerland's Marco Odermatt, the two-time defending champion. not only won his third straight championship but completely dominated, winning 9 of the 10 races in the discipline.

== Season summary ==
The first giant slalom of the season, scheduled as usual on the Rettenbach glacier in Sölden, Austria in October, had to be cancelled due to high winds, although 47 skiers had already completed their first run. The cancelled race was subsequently rescheduled for Aspen on 1 March 2024. The first race of the season was actually held in Val d'Isère in early December, and Marco Odermatt continued his dominance from the prior two seasons; as of this race, he has now won 13 of the last 19 World Cup giant slaloms, including four in a row. At Alta Badia, Odermatt extended his dominance to six giant slaloms in a row, winning both races in an unusual Sunday-Monday pairing. Odermatt then continued his dominance by winning the giant slaloms in Adelboden, Schlamding, and Bansko, making him 6-for-6 in giant slaloms for the season and giving his a winning streak of nine straight World Cup giant slaloms. When Odermatt next won the first two giant slaloms in the U.S. (Palisades Tahoe and Aspen), he clinched the discipline title for the season, and he then won the final Aspen giant slalom to stretch his winning streak in the discipline to 12 straight, including all 9 in the current season, leaving him 2 short of Ingemar Stenmark's all-time record of 14 straight in one discipline. The penultimate giant slalom in Kranjska Gora was cancelled due to lack of snow, setting the stage for a four-way battle for the other two spots on the podium at finals, with only 23 points separating second from fifth.

== Finals ==
The World Cup finals in men's giant slalom took place on Saturday, 16 March 2024, in Saalbach-Hinterglemm, Austria. Only the top 25 skiers in the World Cup giant slalom discipline and the winner of the Junior World Championship in the discipline, plus any skiers who had scored at least 500 points in the World Cup overall classification for the season, were eligible to compete in the final, and only the top 15 finishers earned World Cup points in the discipline.

Coming into the finals, Odermatt (undefeated for the season) seemed about to match Stenmark's record of winning all 10 giant slaloms in a season, set in the 1979 season (45 years ago). However, while leading the race during his second run, Odermatt missed a gate, ending his pursuit of Stenmark's record and handing the victory to his Swiss teammate Loïc Meillard, who thus finished second in the discipline for the season, with Filip Zubčić of Croatia third.

== Standings ==
| | Venue | 29 Oct 2023; Sölden | 9 Dec 2023; Val d'Isère | 17 Dec 2023; Alta Badia | 18 Dec 2023; Alta Badia | 6 Jan 2024; Adelboden | 23 Jan 2024; Schladming | 10 Feb 2024; Bansko | 24 Feb 2024; Palisades Tahoe | 1 Mar 2024; Aspen | 2 Mar 2024; Aspen | 9 Mar 2024; Kranjska Gora | 16 Mar 2024; Saalbach | |
| # | Skier | (Austria) | (France) | (Italy) | (Italy) | (Switzerland) | (Austria) | (Bulgaria) | (United States) | (United States) | (United States) | (Slovenia) | (Austria) | Total |
| | (Switzerland) Marco Odermatt | x | 100 | 100 | 100 | 100 | 100 | 100 | 100 | 100 | 100 | x | DNF2 | 900 |
| 2 | (Switzerland) Loïc Meillard | x | 40 | 15 | 32 | DNF1 | 45 | 36 | 40 | 80 | 80 | x | 100 | 468 |
| 3 | (Croatia) Filip Zubčić | x | 50 | 80 | 50 | 60 | 45 | 29 | DNF2 | 16 | 40 | x | 32 | 402 |
| 4 | (Norway) Henrik Kristoffersen | x | 32 | 36 | 36 | 45 | 29 | 40 | 80 | 32 | 20 | x | 45 | 395 |
| 5 | (Slovenia) Žan Kranjec | x | 36 | 60 | 60 | 10 | 60 | 45 | 14 | 26 | 36 | x | 0 | 347 |
| 6 | (Norway) Alexander Steen Olsen | x | DNF2 | 22 | 26 | 40 | 50 | 80 | 29 | 36 | 14 | x | 29 | 326 |
| 7 | (Switzerland) Thomas Tumler | x | 11 | 16 | 24 | 6 | 14 | 32 | 50 | 50 | 32 | x | 60 | 295 |
| 8 | (Norway) Atle Lie McGrath | x | 22 | DNF2 | 40 | 36 | 15 | DNF2 | 20 | 60 | 29 | x | 22 | 244 |
| 9 | (Austria) Manuel Feller | x | 24 | DNF2 | 11 | 4 | 80 | 60 | 32 | DNF1 | DNS | x | 26 | 237 |
| 10 | (Andorra) Joan Verdú | x | 60 | 45 | DNF1 | DNS | 36 | DNF1 | DNS2 | DNS | | x | 80 | 221 |
| 11 | (United States) River Radamus | x | 26 | DNF1 | 18 | 50 | 8 | 22 | 60 | 24 | 9 | x | 0 | 217 |
| 12 | (Austria) Marco Schwarz | x | 80 | 50 | 80 | DNS | | | | | | | | 210 |
| 13 | (Switzerland) Gino Caviezel | x | DNF1 | 26 | 15 | 22 | DNF1 | 20 | 45 | 12 | 26 | x | 40 | 206 |
| 14 | (Austria) Stefan Brennsteiner | x | DNQ | 32 | DNF1 | 12 | 16 | 50 | DNF2 | DNF1 | 24 | x | 50 | 184 |
| | (Germany) Alexander Schmid | x | 29 | 14 | 22 | 26 | 24 | 15 | 16 | DNF1 | 22 | x | 16 | 184 |
| 16 | (Italy) Alex Vinatzer | x | 18 | 12 | 10 | 24 | 13 | 4 | 12 | 40 | 45 | x | 0 | 178 |
| 17 | (Italy) Luca De Aliprandini | x | DNF2 | DNF1 | 7 | 32 | 12 | 8 | DNF2 | 45 | 50 | x | 18 | 172 |
| 18 | (Norway) Timon Haugan | x | DNS | DNQ | 14 | DNQ | 26 | 18 | DNF2 | 13 | 60 | x | 40 | 171 |
| 19 | (France) Thibaut Favrot | x | DNF2 | 24 | 12 | 15 | 22 | 12 | 13 | 22 | 16 | x | 24 | 160 |
| 20 | (France) Alexis Pinturault | x | 45 | 40 | 45 | DNS | | | | | | | | 130 |
| 21 | (Austria) Raphael Haaser | x | DNF1 | DNQ | 4 | 16 | 18 | 11 | 36 | 29 | DNF1 | x | DNF2 | 114 |
| 22 | (Belgium) Sam Maes | x | DNF1 | 13 | 16 | 11 | 9 | DNQ | 24 | 15 | DNQ | x | 20 | 108 |
| 23 | (Norway) Aleksander Aamodt Kilde | x | DNS | 20 | DNS | 80 | DNS | | | | | | | 100 |
| 24 | (Italy) Filippo Della Vite | x | DNF2 | DNF2 | 20 | DNF1 | 32 | 26 | 9 | DNF1 | DNF2 | x | DNF1 | 87 |
| 25 | (Italy) Giovanni Borsotti | x | 16 | 18 | 29 | 9 | DNF2 | 14 | DNF1 | DNF2 | DNF2 | x | 0 | 86 |
| 26 | (France) Léo Anguenot | x | 10 | 11 | 3 | 1 | 10 | 16 | 10 | 20 | DNF1 | x | NE | 81 |
| | (Norway) Rasmus Windingstad | x | 13 | DNQ | DNF1 | 29 | DNF2 | 24 | 15 | DNF1 | DNF1 | x | NE | 81 |
| 28 | (United States) Tommy Ford | x | DNF1 | 29 | DNQ | 14 | 5 | 5 | 11 | DNF1 | 15 | x | NE | 79 |
| 29 | (Switzerland) Justin Murisier | x | DNF2 | DNQ | 6 | 20 | DNQ | 9 | 22 | 8 | 12 | x | NE | 77 |
| 30 | (Switzerland) Fadri Janutin | x | 9 | 10 | DNQ | DNQ | DNQ | 13 | 8 | 18 | 13 | x | NE | 71 |
| 31 | (Austria) Patrick Feurstein | x | 15 | DNQ | 13 | 13 | DNQ | 10 | DNQ | DNQ | 8 | x | NE | 59 |
| 32 | (Austria) Lukas Feurstein | x | DNS | | | | | | 26 | 9 | 10 | x | NE | 45 |
| 33 | (France) Victor Muffat-Jeandet | x | 6 | 4 | DNF2 | DNQ | DNQ | DNQ | DNQ | 14 | 11 | x | NE | 35 |
| 34 | (Switzerland) Livio Simonet | x | DNQ | DNF1 | DNQ | 9 | DNQ | 6 | 18 | DNF1 | DNF1 | x | NE | 33 |
| 35 | (Canada) Erik Read | x | 12 | 5 | DNF1 | DNQ | 3 | DNF1 | DNQ | 10 | DNQ | x | NE | 30 |
| 36 | (Austria) Dominik Raschner | x | DNS | | | DNQ | DNQ | DNQ | DNQ | 11 | 18 | x | NE | 29 |
| | (Italy) Hannes Zingerle | x | DNF1 | 7 | DNQ | 2 | 20 | DNQ | DNQ | DNF1 | DNF2 | x | NE | 29 |
| 38 | (Denmark) Christian Borgnæs | x | DNQ | DNQ | 3 | 18 | 6 | DNF1 | DNQ | DNF2 | DNQ | x | NE | 27 |
| 39 | (Switzerland) Sandro Zurbrügg | x | 14 | DNQ | DNF1 | DNQ | 7 | DNQ | DNQ | DNF1 | DNF1 | x | NE | 21 |
| 40 | (Austria) Noel Zwischenbrugger | x | 20 | DNF1 | DNQ | DNQ | DNQ | DNF1 | DNS | DNQ | DNF1 | x | NE | 20 |
| 41 | (Canada) James Crawford | x | DNS | 6 | 9 | DNQ | DNS | | | | | x | NE | 15 |
| 42 | (Norway) Fredrik Møller | x | 7 | DNQ | DNF1 | 7 | DNQ | DNQ | DNQ | DNF1 | DNQ | x | NE | 14 |
| 43 | (Germany) Anton Grammel | x | 8 | DNQ | DNQ | DNQ | DNQ | DNQ | DNQ | 5 | 0 | x | NE | 13 |
| 44 | (Lithuania) Andrej Drukarov | x | DNF1 | 8 | DNF1 | DNQ | DNQ | DNQ | DNQ | 3 | DNF1 | x | NE | 11 |
| | (Germany) Fabian Gratz | x | DNQ | DNQ | DNF1 | 5 | DNQ | DNQ | DNQ | DNF1 | 6 | x | NE | 11 |
| | (Japan) Seigo Katō | x | DNQ | DNQ | DNQ | DNQ | 11 | DNF1 | DNQ | DNF1 | DNS | x | NE | 11 |
| 47 | (France) Mathieu Faivre | x | DNQ | 9 | DNQ | DNS | | | | | | x | NE | 9 |
| 48 | (Austria) Joshua Sturm | x | DNS | DNQ | 8 | DNF1 | DNQ | DNF1 | DNF2 | DNQ | DNQ | x | NE | 8 |
| 49 | (Switzerland) Luca Aerni | x | DNS | | | | | | | 7 | DNQ | x | NE | 7 |
| | (Norway) Halvor Hilde Gunleiksrud | x | DNS | | | | | DNQ | DNQ | DNF1 | 7 | x | NE | 7 |
| | (United States) Patrick Kenney | x | DNF1 | DNF1 | DNF1 | DNS | | | 7 | DNQ | DNQ | x | NE | 7 |
| | (Slovakia) Andreas Žampa | x | DNF1 | DNQ | DNQ | DNQ | DNQ | 7 | DNQ | DNF1 | DNQ | x | NE | 7 |
| 53 | (Germany) Linus Straßer | x | DNS | | | | | | | 6 | DNS | x | NE | 6 |
| 54 | (Sweden) William Hansson | x | DNF1 | DNS | | | DNQ | DNS | DNQ | DNS | 5 | x | NE | 5 |
| | (Sweden) Mattias Rönngren | x | DNQ | DNQ | 5 | DNF1 | DNQ | DNQ | DNQ | DNF1 | DNQ | x | NE | 5 |
| 56 | (Australia) Louis Muhlen-Schulte | x | DNF1 | DNQ | DNQ | DNQ | DNQ | DNQ | DNQ | 4 | DNQ | x | NE | 4 |
| | (Spain) Albert Ortega | x | DNF1 | DNF1 | DNQ | DNQ | 4 | DNQ | DNS | DNF1 | DNF1 | x | NE | 4 |
| 58 | (United States) George Steffey | x | DNQ | DNF1 | DNQ | DNQ | DNQ | 3 | DNQ | DNF1 | DNQ | x | NE | 3 |
| | (Germany) Jonas Stockinger | x | DNF1 | DNQ | DNQ | 3 | DNQ | DNQ | DNS | DNF1 | DNF1 | x | NE | 3 |
| | References | | | | | | | | | | | | | |

=== Legend ===
- Winner (100 points)
- 2nd place (80 points)
- 3rd place (60 points)
- DNQ = Did not qualify for run 2
- DNF1 = Did not finish run 1
- DSQ1 = Disqualified run 1
- DNF2 = Did not finish run 2
- DSQ2 = Disqualified run 2
- DNS2 = Did not start run 2
- Did not start (DNS)
- Not eligible for finals (NE)
- Race canceled (x)
- Updated at 16 March 2024, after all events.

== See also ==
- 2024 Alpine Skiing World Cup – Men's summary rankings
- 2024 Alpine Skiing World Cup – Men's overall
- 2024 Alpine Skiing World Cup – Men's downhill
- 2024 Alpine Skiing World Cup – Men's super-G
- 2024 Alpine Skiing World Cup – Men's slalom
- World Cup scoring system
