= Eduard Hallberg =

Finnish alpine skier (born 2003)

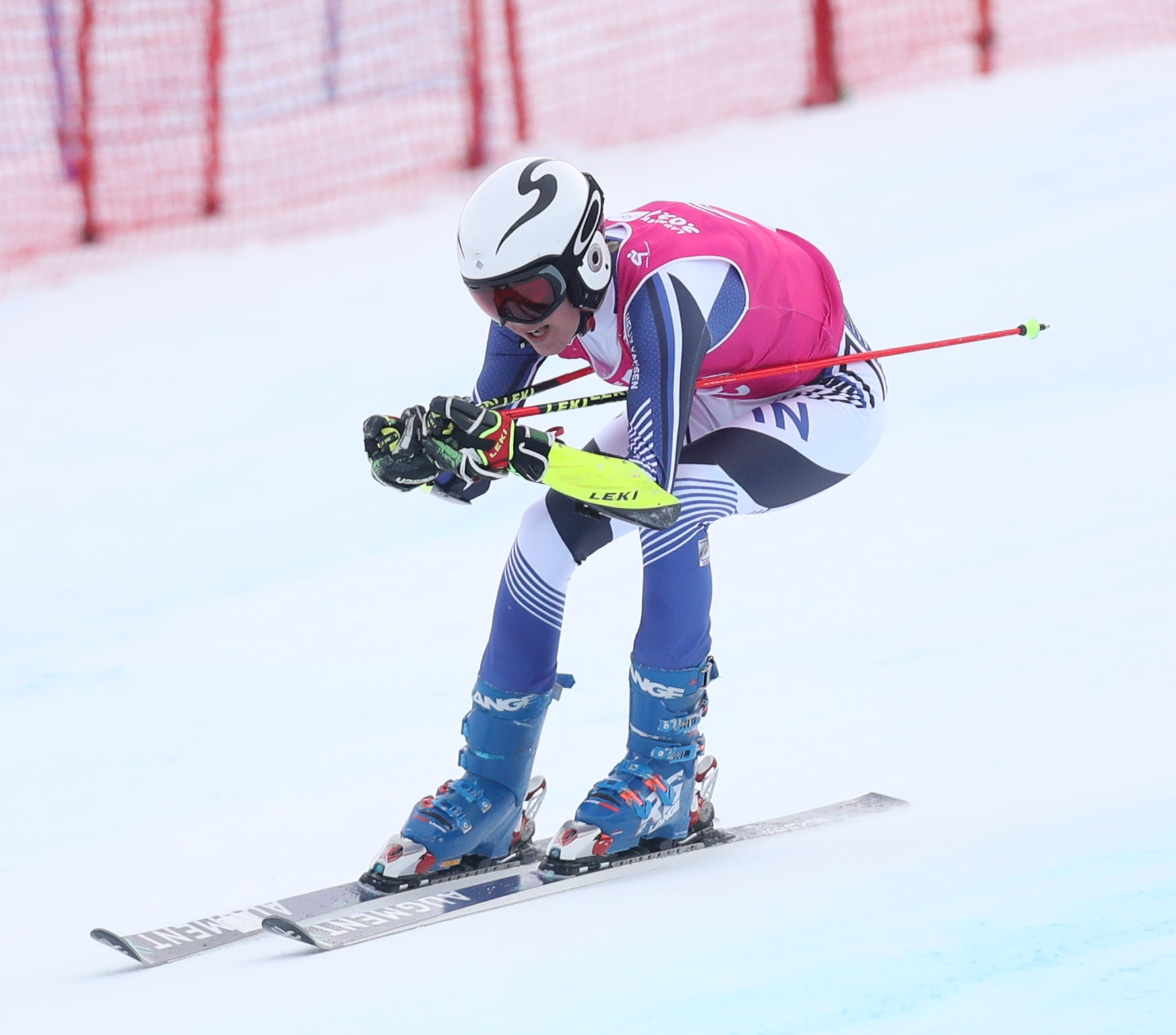
- Hallberg in 2020

Personal information
- Born: 6 August 2003 (age 22) Sipoo, Finland

Skiing career
- Country: Finland
- Sport: Alpine skiing
- Club: Slalom66-club
- Disciplines: Slalom, Giant slalom
- World Cup debut: 9 December 2023 (age 20)

Olympics
- Teams: 1 – (2026)
- Medals: 0

World Championships
- Teams: 2 – (2023, 2025)
- Medals: 0

World Cup
- Seasons: 3 – (2024–2026)
- Wins: 0
- Podiums: 3 – (3 SL)
- Overall titles: 0 – (21st in 2026)
- Discipline titles: 0 – (8th in SL, 2026)
Medal record
Men's alpine skiing
Representing Finland
World Cup race podiums
Event	1st	2nd	3rd
Slalom	0	1	2
Giant slalom	0	0	0
Total	0	1	2

Eduard Hallberg (born 6 August 2003) is a Finnish World Cup alpine ski racer who specializes in the technical events of slalom and giant slalom.

== Career ==
At age sixteen, Hallberg moved to Norway to attend a ski high school in Oppdal. Hallberg finished 13th in slalom skiing at the 2020 Winter Youth Olympics. He won silver in giant slalom at the FIS Junior World Ski Championships. He withdrew from both slalom and giant slalom at the same year's World Championships in Courchevel and Méribel. He finished 12th in the slalom at the 2025 World Championships in Saalbach, and withdrew from the giant slalom and the alpine combined slalom team events.

Hallberg won the 2023–2024 Europa Cup in Kläppen, Sweden, and Hafjell, Norway, and came in third overall. Hallberg competed in the World Cup in giant slalom for the first time in Val-d'Isère in December 2023. Hallberg collected World Cup points for the first time after finishing 24th in a race in Levi, 8th in Gurgl, and 15th in Schladming.

Hallberg attained his first World Cup podium in November 2025 in a slalom at Levi, Finland.

In 2023 he was awarded the youth prize by Finlands Svenska Idrott, FSI, the umbrella organisation for Swedish-speaking sports federations in Finland and the Åland Islands.

== World Cup results ==
=== Season standings ===
Season
Season	Age	Overall	Slalom	Giant slalom	Super-G	Downhill
2025	21	88	36	—	—	—
2026	22	21	8	—	—	—

=== Race podiums ===
- 0 wins
- 3 podiums – (3 SL), 7 top tens

Season
Season	Date	Location	Discipline	Place
2026	16 November 2025	Levi, Finland	Slalom	3rd
2026	7 January 2026	Madonna di Campiglio, Italy	Slalom	2nd
2026	25 March 2026	Hafjell, Norway	Slalom	3rd

== World Championship results ==
Year
Year	Age	Slalom	Giant slalom	Super-G	Downhill	Combined	Team combined	Parallel	Team event
2023	19	DNF1	DNF1	—	—	—	—N/a	—	—
2025	21	12	DNF2	—	—	—N/a	DNF2	—N/a	—

== Olympic results ==
Year
Year	Age	Slalom	Giant slalom	Super-G	Downhill	Team combined
2026	22	DNF1	DNF1	—	—	9
