= Simon Jocher =

German alpine skier (born 1996)

Personal information
- Born: 25 May 1996 (age 30) Schongau, Bavaria, Germany
- Height: 1.84 m (6 ft 0 in)

Skiing career
- Country: Germany
- Sport: Alpine skiing
- Club: SC Garmisch
- Disciplines: Downhill, super-G
- World Cup debut: 1 February 2020 (age 23)

Olympics
- Teams: 2 – (2022, 2026)
- Medals: 0

World Championships
- Teams: 3 – (2021, 2023, 2025)
- Medals: 0

World Cup
- Seasons: 7 – (2020–2026)
- Podiums: 0
- Overall titles: 0 – (61st in 2026)
- Discipline titles: 0 – (21st in SG, 2026)

Simon Jocher (born 25 May 1996) is a German World Cup alpine ski racer, and specializes in the speed events of downhill and super-G.

From Bavaria, Jocher has competed for Germany at two Winter Olympics and three World Championships.

== World Cup results ==
=== Season standings ===
Season
Season	Age	Overall	Slalom	Giant slalom	Super-G	Downhill
2021	24	100	—	—	39	48
2022	25	67	—	—	33	27
2023	26	114	—	—	46	47
2024	27	80	—	—	26	41
2025	28	115	—	—	—	42
2026	29	61	—	—	21	34

=== Top-ten finishes ===
- 0 podiums, 3 top tens – (2 DH, 1 SG)

Season
Season	Date	Location	Discipline	Place
2022	18 December 2021	Val Gardena, Italy	Downhill	8th
2022	4 March 2022	Kvitfjell, Norway	Downhill	7th
2026	27 December 2025	Livigno, Italy	Super-G	5th

== World Championship results ==
Year
Year	Age	Slalom	Giant slalom	Super-G	Downhill	Combined	Team combined
2021	24	—	—	16	—	5	—N/a
2023	26	—	—	29	―	13	—N/a
2025	28	—	—	18	30	—N/a	8

== Olympic results ==
Year
Year	Age	Slalom	Giant slalom	Super-G	Downhill	Combined	Team combined
2022	25	—	—	13	—	DNF2	—N/a
2026	29	—	—	17	21	—N/a	10
