= Nils Allègre =

French alpine skier (born 1994)

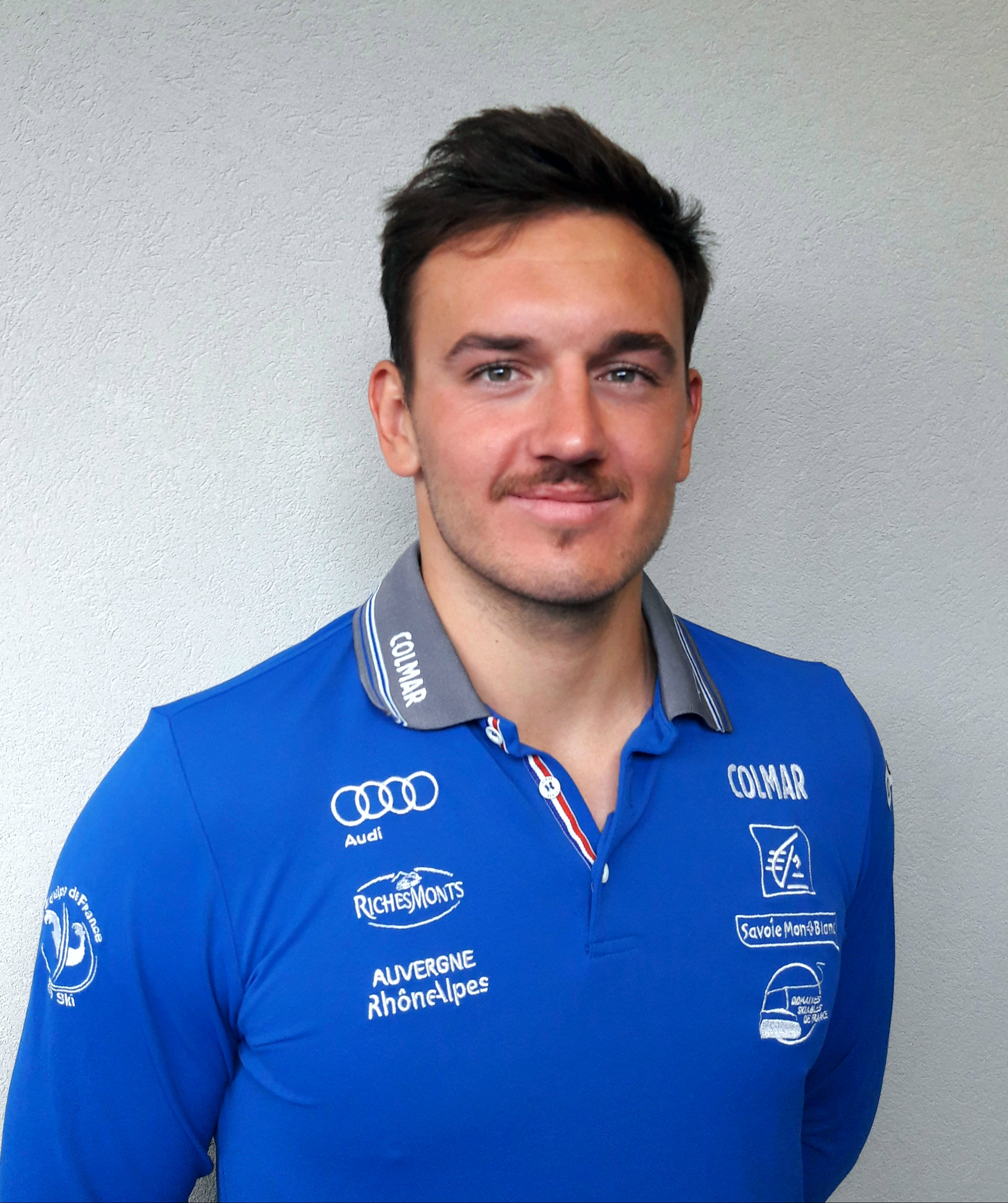
- Allègre in 2018

Personal information
- Born: 2 January 1994 (age 32) Briançon, Hautes-Alpes, France
- Height: 1.80 m (5 ft 11 in)

Skiing career
- Country: France
- Sport: Alpine skiing
- Club: CS Serre Chevalier
- Disciplines: Downhill, Super-G
- World Cup debut: 26 October 2014 (age 20)

Olympics
- Teams: 2 – (2022, 2026)
- Medals: 0

World Championships
- Teams: 4 – (2019–2025)
- Medals: 0

World Cup
- Seasons: 11 – (2015, 2017–2026)
- Wins: 1 – (1 SG)
- Podiums: 1 – (1 SG)
- Overall titles: 0 – (17th in 2024)
- Discipline titles: 0 – (8th in DH, 2026)

Nils Allègre (French pronunciation: [nils alɛɡʁ]; born 2 January 1994) is a French World Cup alpine ski racer. He specializes in the speed events of downhill and super-G.

== World Cup results ==
=== Season standings ===
Season
Season	Age	Overall	Slalom	Giant slalom	Super-G	Downhill	Combined
2018	24	141	—	—	43	—	—
2019	25	72	—	—	29	38	25
2020	26	30	—	—	16	21	13
2021	27	40	—	—	14	21	—N/a
2022	28	74	—	—	26	41	—N/a
2023	29	32	—	—	12	24	—N/a
2024	30	17	—	—	9	10	—N/a
2025	31	19	—	—	12	10	—N/a
2026	32	19	—	—	13	8	—N/a

=== Top-five finishes ===
- 1 win (1 SG)
- 1 podium (1 SG), 7 top fives (4 DH, 3 SG), 29 top tens

Season
Season	Date	Location	Discipline	Place
2021	6 February 2021	Garmisch-Partenkirchen, Germany	Super-G	4th
2024	14 December 2023	Val Gardena, Italy	Downhill	4th
2024	27 January 2024	Garmisch-Partenkirchen, Germany	Super-G	1st
2025	21 December 2024	Val Gardena, Italy	Downhill	4th
2026	18 December 2025	Val Gardena, Italy	Downhill	4th
2026	19 December 2025	Val Gardena, Italy	Super-G	4th
2026	24 January 2026	Kitzbühel, Austria	Downhill	5th

== World Championship results ==
Year
Year	Age	Slalom	Giant slalom	Super-G	Downhill	Combined	Team combined
2019	25	—	—	14	—	—	—N/a
2021	27	—	—	21	7	DNS2	—N/a
2023	29	—	—	21	21	DNS2	—N/a
2025	31	—	—	17	10	—N/a	DNF2

== Olympic results ==
Year
Year	Age	Slalom	Giant slalom	Super-G	Downhill	Combined	Team combined
2022	28	—	—	26	—	—	—N/a
2026	32	—	—	4	8	—N/a	5
