= Alpine skiing at the 2026 Winter Olympics – Men's team combined =

Men's team combined at the XXV Olympic Winter Games
- Alpine skiing
- Venue: Stelvio, Bormio
- Date: 9 February 2026

Medalists
1st place, gold medalist(s)		Franjo von Allmen; Tanguy Nef	Switzerland
2nd place, silver medalist(s)		Vincent Kriechmayr; Manuel Feller	Austria
2nd place, silver medalist(s)		Marco Odermatt; Loïc Meillard	Switzerland

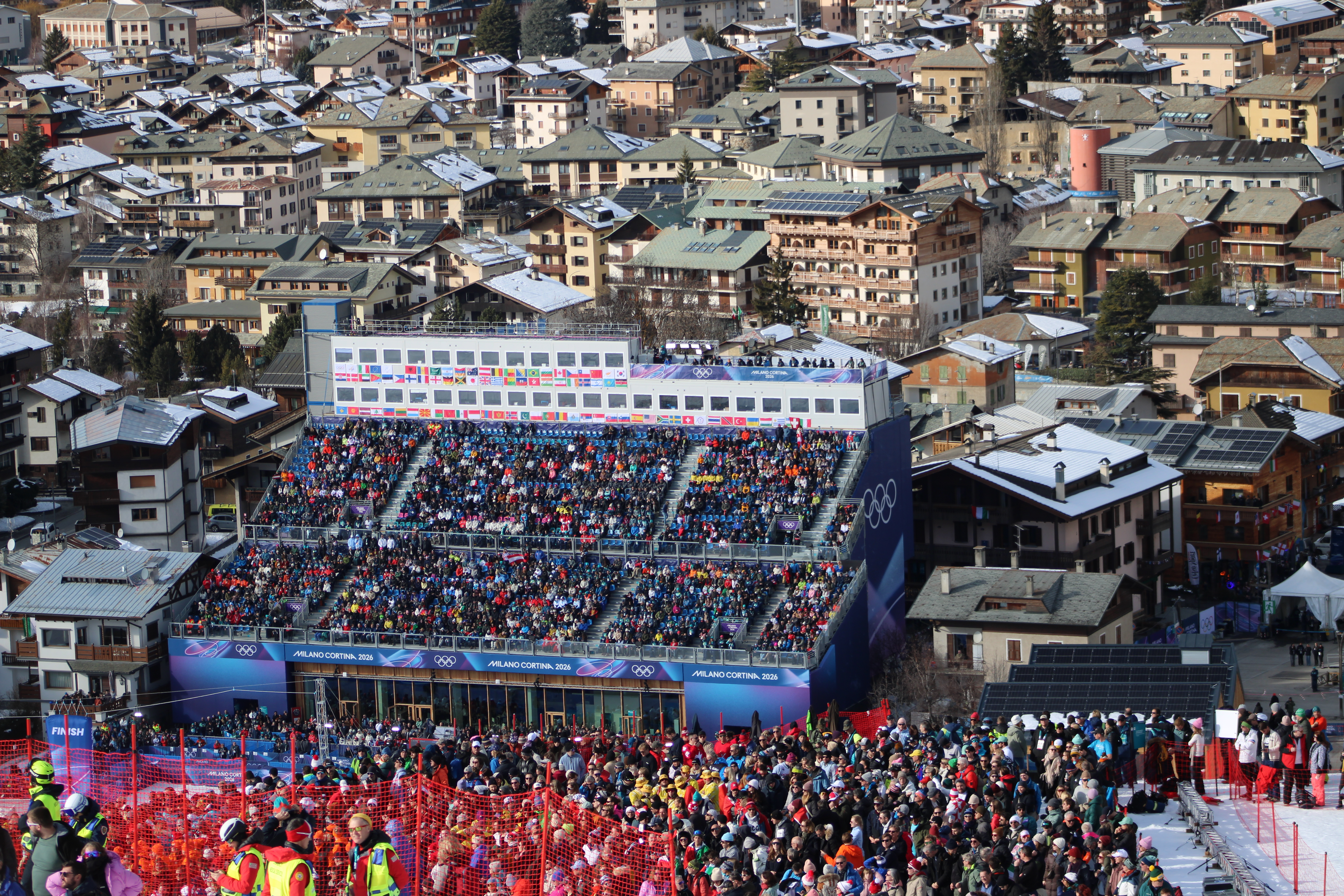
Fans in Stelvio Ski Centre in Bormio.

The men's team combined competition of the 2026 Winter Olympics was held on Monday, 9 February, at Stelvio Ski Centre in Bormio. This was the inaugural edition of this event at the Olympics. Franjo von Allmen and Tanguy Nef became the champions. Two teams shared the second place, Marco Odermatt (downhill) and Loïc Meillard (slalom) of Switzerland, and Vincent Kriechmayr (downhill) and Manuel Feller (slalom) of Austria. For Nef, Meillard, and Kriechmayer these were their first Olympic medals.

== Background ==
Three Swiss teams swept the podium of the 2025 World Ski Championships in men's team combined. Franjo von Allmen and Loïc Meillard became the champions.

== Results ==
The downhill started at 10:30, followed by slalom at 14:00 local time (UTC+1). The downhill was held under sunny skies and the snow condition was hard; the air temperature was −7.1 °C (19 °F) at the starting gate and −5.8 °C (22 °F) at the finish area. The slalom was held under mostly sunny skies and the snow condition was hard; the air temperature was 1.6 °C (35 °F) at the starting gate and 4.7 °C (40 °F) at the finish area.

Ranking	Bib	Country	Downhill				Slalom				Total	
Ranking	Bib	Country	Athlete	Time	Deficit	Ranking	Athlete	Time	Deficit	Ranking	Time	Deficit
1st place, gold medalist(s)	14	Switzerland	Franjo von Allmen	1:52.22	+0.42	4	Tanguy Nef	51.82	—	1	2:44.04	—
2nd place, silver medalist(s)	10	Austria	Vincent Kriechmayr	1:53.05	+1.25	7	Manuel Feller	51.98	+0.16	2	2:45.03	+0.99
2nd place, silver medalist(s)	7	Switzerland	Marco Odermatt	1:52.08	+0.28	3	Loïc Meillard	52.95	+1.13	15	2:45.03	+0.99
4	19	Austria	Raphael Haaser	1:53.07	+1.27	8	Michael Matt	51.99	+0.17	3	2:45.06	+1.02
5	12	Italy	Dominik Paris	1:52.39	+0.59	5	Tommaso Sala	52.77	+0.95	12	2:45.16	+1.12
5	11	France	Nils Allègre	1:52.71	+0.91	6	Clément Noël	52.45	+0.63	10	2:45.16	+1.12
7	9	Italy	Giovanni Franzoni	1:51.80	—	1	Alex Vinatzer	53.46	+1.64	18	2:45.26	+1.22
8	18	Austria	Stefan Babinsky	1:53.10	+1.30	10	Fabio Gstrein	52.35	+0.53	8	2:45.45	+1.41
9	16	Finland	Elian Lehto	1:53.51	+1.71	13	Eduard Hallberg	52.14	+0.32	5	2:45.65	+1.61
10	3	Germany	Simon Jocher	1:53.13	+1.33	11	Linus Straßer	52.60	+0.78	11	2:45.73	+1.69
11	6	Austria	Daniel Hemetsberger	1:53.07	+1.27	8	Marco Schwarz	52.83	+1.01	13	2:45.90	+1.86
12	20	Norway	Adrian Smiseth Sejersted	1:53.69	+1.89	15	Atle Lie McGrath	52.23	+0.41	7	2:45.92	+1.88
13	13	Switzerland	Alexis Monney	1:51.97	+0.17	2	Daniel Yule	54.02	+2.20	19	2:45.99	+1.95
14	15	Italy	Mattia Casse	1:53.26	+1.46	12	Tommaso Saccardi	52.91	+1.09	14	2:46.17	+2.13
15	4	France	Maxence Muzaton	1:54.31	+2.51	18	Paco Rassat	52.08	+0.26	4	2:46.39	+2.35
16	5	France	Nils Alphand	1:54.29	+2.49	17	Steven Amiez	52.37	+0.55	9	2:46.66	+2.62
17	21	Norway	Simen Sellæg	1:54.72	+2.92	19	Timon Haugan	52.18	+0.36	6	2:46.90	+2.86
18	1	Switzerland	Stefan Rogentin	1:53.64	+1.84	14	Matthias Iten	53.44	+1.62	17	2:47.08	+3.04
19	17	United States	Kyle Negomir	1:53.99	+2.19	16	River Radamus	53.35	+1.53	16	2:47.34	+3.30
20	2	Czech Republic	Jan Zabystřan	1:55.68	+3.88	20	Marek Müller	55.02	+3.20	20	2:50.70	+6.66
—	8	Italy	Florian Schieder	DNF			Tobias Kastlunger	DNS			DNF	
