= Olympialøypa =

Ski course in Val-d'Isère, France

- Interactive map of Olympialøypa
- Location within Norway
- 61°14′32″N 10°26′31″E
- Location: Hafjell, Norway
- Opened: 1991

Giant slalom
- Start: 644 m (2,113 ft) (AA)
- Finish: 273 m (896 ft)
- Vertical drop: 371 m (1,217 ft)
- Max incline: 26.1 degrees (49%)
- Avg incline: 17.8 degrees (32%)
- Min incline: 6.8 degrees (12%)

Slalom
- Start: 493 m (1,617 ft) (AA)
- Finish: 273 m (896 ft)
- Vertical drop: 220 m (722 ft)
- Max incline: 27.5 degrees (52%)
- Avg incline: 18.8 degrees (34%)
- Min incline: 5.7 degrees (10%)

Olympialøypa is an Olympic and World Cup technical ski course in Hafjell, Norway.

== History ==
Olympialøypa debuted in March 1991 with men's World Cup events in giant slalom and slalom. The course was built especially for the 1994 Winter Olympics in Lillehammer for alpine skiing in the technical disciplines for men and women. The speed events were held at Kvitfjell on its Olympiabakken course.

The course hosted the season-ending World Cup finals in 1996 and 2003 in slalom and giant slalom for both men and women. Unlike Kvitfjell's Olympiabakken speed course, a regular stop on the circuit, this technical course has hosted only a handful of World Cup events.

== Olympics ==
=== Men's events ===
Event	Type	Date	Gold	Silver	Bronze
1994	GS	23 February 1994	(Germany) Markus Wasmeier	(Switzerland) Urs Kälin	(Austria) Christian Mayer
1994	KB	14 February 1994; 25 February 1994	(Norway) Lasse Kjus	(Norway) Kjetil André Aamodt	(Norway) H. C. Strand Nilsen
1994	SL	27 February 1994	(Austria) Thomas Stangassinger	(Italy) Alberto Tomba	(Slovenia) Jure Košir

The combined dowhnill was held at Olympiabakken on 14 February.

=== Women's events ===
Event	Type	Date	Gold	Silver	Bronze
1994	KB	20 February 1994; 21 February 1994	(Sweden) Pernilla Wiberg	(Switzerland) Vreni Schneider	(Slovenia) Alenka Dovžan
1994	GS	24 February 1994	(Italy) Deborah Compagnoni	(Germany) Martina Ertl	(Switzerland) Vreni Schneider
1994	SL	26 February 1994	(Switzerland) Vreni Schneider	(Austria) Elfi Eder	(Slovenia) Katja Koren

The women's combined was held at Olympiabakken on 20 February.

== World Cup ==
=== Men ===
Season	Date	Event	Winner	Second	Third
1990/91	1 March 1991	GS	(Italy) Alberto Tomba	(Austria) Rudolf Nierlich	(Austria) Stephan Eberharter
1990/91	2 March 1991	SL	(Austria) Michael Tritscher	(Austria) Thomas Stangassinger	(Switzerland) Paul Accola
1995/96	9 March 1996	GS	(Switzerland) Urs Kälin	(Norway) Tom Stiansen	(France) Christophe Saioni
1995/96	10 March 1996	SL	(Austria) Thomas Sykora	(France) Sébastien Amiez	(Slovenia) Jure Košir
2002/03	15 March 2003	GS	(Austria) Hans Knauß	(Austria) Benjamin Raich	(Switzerland) Michael von Grünigen
2002/03	16 March 2003	SL	(Italy) Giorgio Rocca	(Finland) Kalle Palander	(Austria) Manfred Pranger
2024/25	15 March 2025	GS	(Switzerland) Loïc Meillard	(Switzerland) Marco Odermatt	(Switzerland) Thomas Tumler
2024/25	16 March 2025	SL	(Switzerland) Loïc Meillard	(Norway) Atle Lie McGrath	(Brazil) Lucas Pinheiro Braathen
2025/26	24 March 2026	GS	(Brazil) Lucas Pinheiro Braathen	(Switzerland) Loïc Meillard	(Norway) Atle Lie McGrath
2025/26	25 March 2026	SL	(Norway) Timon Haugan	(Switzerland) Loïc Meillard	(Finland) Eduard Hallberg

=== Women ===
Season	Date	Event	Winner	Second	Third
1995/96	9 March 1996	GS	(Germany) Katja Seizinger	(Germany) Martina Ertl	(Austria) Alexandra Meissnitzer
1995/96	10 March 1996	SL	(Austria) Karin Roten	(Sweden) Pernilla Wiberg	(Norway) Marianne Kjørstad
2002/03	15 March 2003	SL	(United States) Kristina Koznick	(France) Laure Pequegnot	(Austria) Marlies Schild
2002/03	16 March 2003	GS	(Italy) Karen Putzer	(Italy) Denise Karbon	(Austria) Nicole Hosp
2025/26	24 March 2026	SL	(United States) Mikaela Shiffrin	(Switzerland) Wendy Holdener	(Germany) Emma Aicher
2025/26	25 March 2026	GS	(Canada) Valerie Grenier	(Norway) Mina Fürst Holtmann	(Austria) Julia Scheib
