= FIS Alpine World Ski Championships 2025 – Men's super-G =

Men's super-G at the FIS Alpine World Ski Championships 2025
- Venue: Skicircus Saalbach-Hinterglemm/Leogang
- Location: Saalbach-Hinterglemm, Austria
- Dates: 7 February
- Competitors: 59 from 23 nations
- Winning time: 1:24.57

Medalists
gold medal	Marco Odermatt	Switzerland
silver medal	Raphael Haaser	Austria
bronze medal	Adrian Smiseth Sejersted	Norway

Men's Super-G
- Location: Schneekristall/Zwolfer; Saalbach, Austria
- Vertical: 719 m (2,359 ft)
- Top elevation: 1,791 m (5,876 ft)
- Base elevation: 1,072 m (3,517 ft)
- Longest run: 2.341 km (1.45 mi)

The Men's super-G competition at the FIS Alpine World Ski Championships 2025 was held on Friday, 7 February 2025, and was the first men's event.

== Results ==
The race was started at 11:30 CET (UTC+1) under sunny skies; the snow was hard and the air temperature was 1 °C (34 °F) at the start and finish.

Rank	Bib	Name	Country	Time	Diff
1st place, gold medalist(s)	8	Marco Odermatt	Switzerland	1:24.57	—
2nd place, silver medalist(s)	10	Raphael Haaser	Austria	1:25.57	+1.00
3rd place, bronze medalist(s)	1	Adrian Smiseth Sejersted	Norway	1:25.72	+1.15
4	9	Vincent Kriechmayr	Austria	1:25.77	+1.20
5	14	Fredrik Møller	Norway	1:25.79	+1.22
6	5	Stefan Babinsky	Austria	1:25.87	+1.30
7	11	Dominik Paris	Italy	1:25.88	+1.31
7	18	Ryan Cochran-Siegle	United States	1:25.88	+1.31
9	12	Stefan Rogentin	Switzerland	1:26.25	+1.68
10	17	Jeffrey Read	Canada	1:26.56	+1.99
11	16	Lukas Feurstein	Austria	1:26.59	+2.02
12	15	Franjo von Allmen	Switzerland	1:26.62	+2.05
13	3	Florian Loriot	France	1:26.74	+2.17
14	39	Nejc Naraločnik	Slovenia	1:26.76	+2.19
15	22	Bryce Bennett	United States	1:26.83	+2.26
16	27	Jan Zabystřan	Czech Republic	1:26.85	+2.28
17	6	Nils Allègre	France	1:26.89	+2.32
18	24	Simon Jocher	Germany	1:27.02	+2.45
19	30	River Radamus	United States	1:27.09	+2.52
20	33	Riley Seger	Canada	1:27.22	+2.65
20	23	Felix Monsén	Sweden	1:27.22	+2.65
22	29	Romed Baumann	Germany	1:27.24	+2.67
23	13	Mattia Casse	Italy	1:27.39	+2.82
24	28	Christof Innerhofer	Italy	1:27.54	+2.97
25	2	Jared Goldberg	United States	1:27.68	+3.11
26	32	Elian Lehto	Finland	1:27.91	+3.34
27	20	James Crawford	Canada	1:27.98	+3.41
28	21	Brodie Seger	Canada	1:28.35	+3.78
29	41	Roy-Alexander Steudle	Great Britain	1:28.41	+3.84
30	35	Henrik von Appen	Chile	1:28.73	+4.16
31	37	Rok Ažnoh	Slovenia	1:28.78	+4.21
32	42	Rasmus Windingstad	Norway	1:28.86	+4.29
33	43	Marco Pfiffner	Liechtenstein	1:29.50	+4.93
34	36	Tiziano Gravier	Argentina	1:29.58	+5.01
35	50	Juhan Luik	Estonia	1:29.98	+5.41
36	40	Jaakko Tapanainen	Finland	1:30.26	+5.69
37	49	Owen Vinter	Great Britain	1:30.92	+6.35
38	47	Jan Koula	Czech Republic	1:31.70	+7.13
39	56	Roman Tsybelenko	Ukraine	1:35.06	+10.49
	4	Alexis Monney	Switzerland	Did not finish	
	19	Giovanni Franzoni	Italy	Did not finish	
	25	Miha Hrobat	Slovenia	Did not finish	
	26	Matthieu Bailet	France	Did not finish	
	31	Nils Alphand	France	Did not finish	
	34	Martin Čater	Slovenia	Did not finish	
	38	Luis Vogt	Germany	Did not finish	
	44	Ander Mintegui	Spain	Did not finish	
	48	Barnabás Szőllős	Israel	Did not finish	
	51	Ivan Kovbasnyuk	Ukraine	Did not finish	
	52	Patrik Forejtek	Czech Republic	Did not finish	
	53	David Kubeš	Czech Republic	Did not finish	
	54	Denni Xhepa	Albania	Did not finish	
	55	Nicolás Quintero	Argentina	Did not finish	
	57	Lauris Opmanis	Latvia	Did not finish	
	58	Elvis Opmanis	Latvia	Did not finish	
	59	Manuel Horwitz	Chile	Did not finish	
	60	Teo Žampa	Slovakia	Did not finish	
	61	Maksym Mariichyn	Ukraine	Did not finish	
	62	Taras Filiak	Ukraine	Did not finish	
	7	Cameron Alexander	Canada	Did not start	
	45	Matej Prieložný	Slovakia	Did not start	
	46	Adur Etxezarreta	Spain	Did not start	
