= Di Prampero =

Ski course in Italy

- Interactive map of Di Prampero
- Location within Northern Italy
- 46°30′18″N 13°34′41″E
- Location: Tarvisio, Italy

Downhill
- Start: 1,645 m (5,397 ft) (AA)
- Finish: 845 m (2,772 ft)
- Vertical drop: 800 m (2,625 ft)
- Length: 3.133 km (1.95 mi)
- Max incline: 25.2 degrees (47%)
- Avg incline: 14.8 degrees (26.5%)
- Min incline: 4.0 degrees (7%)

Di Prampero is a women's World Cup downhill ski course in northern Italy at Tarvisio, which held its first World Cup events in 2007.

The World Cup slope is designed to current safety standards and utilizes safety nets. It is a long women's course with a maximum incline of 47%.

== History ==
Designed by Luciano Lazzaro and constructed in 2000 by Wieser of Campo Tures, Di Prampero was created for both tourism and international racing. On 8 November 2005, fire destroyed the next by lift, which was quickly rebuilt and reopened on 20 January 2006. After FIS inspection in 2005 by Kurt Hoch and Jan Tischhauser (FIS), the course was slightly rebuilt to fit the current standards and improve safety.

In early March 2007, Di Prampero hosted its first three World Cup events (super combined, downhill, and super-G).

The women's World Cup returned to the course with the same three events in 2009 and 2011; after fifteen years, two events were held in January 2026.

== Course ==
=== Sections ===
- Cappia
- Muro Dei Cervi
- Curva Schmalzl
- Muro Lungo
- Variante Lazzaro
- Prati Salman
- Variante FIS
- Muro Di Luki

== World Cup ==
=== Women ===
No.	Type	Season	Date	Winner	Second	Third
1208	SC	2006/07	2 March 2007	(Austria) Nicole Hosp	(United States) Julia Mancuso	(Austria) Marlies Schild
1209	DH	2006/07	3 March 2007	(United States) Julia Mancuso	(Austria) Renate Götschl	(Canada) Emily Brydon
1210	SG	2006/07	4 March 2007	(Austria) Renate Götschl	(Austria) Nicole Hosp	(United States) Julia Mancuso
1274	SC	2008/09	20 February 2009	(Germany) Maria Riesch	(United States) Lindsey Vonn	(Austria) Kathrin Zettel
1275	DH	2008/09	21 February 2009	(Germany) Gina Stechert	(United States) Lindsey Vonn	(Sweden) Anja Pärson
1276	SG	2008/09	22 February 2009	(United States) Lindsey Vonn	(Switzerland) Fabienne Suter	(Slovenia) Tina Maze
1344	SC	2010/11	4 March 2011	(Slovenia) Tina Maze	(United States) Lindsey Vonn	(Germany) Maria Riesch
1345	DH	2010/11	5 March 2011	(Sweden) Anja Pärson	(United States) Lindsey Vonn	(Austria) Elisabeth Görgl
1346	SG	2010/11	6 March 2011	(United States) Lindsey Vonn	(United States) Julia Mancuso	(Germany) Maria Riesch
1865	DH	2025/26	17 January 2026	(Italy) Nicol Delago	(Germany) Kira Weidle-Winkelmann	(United States) Lindsey Vonn
1886	SG	2025/26	18 January 2026	(Germany) Emma Aicher	(United States) Lindsey Vonn	(Czech Republic) Ester Ledecká

Not in original scheduled. Replacement for Sestriere (2011).
