= Emma Aicher =

German-Swedish alpine skier (born 2003)

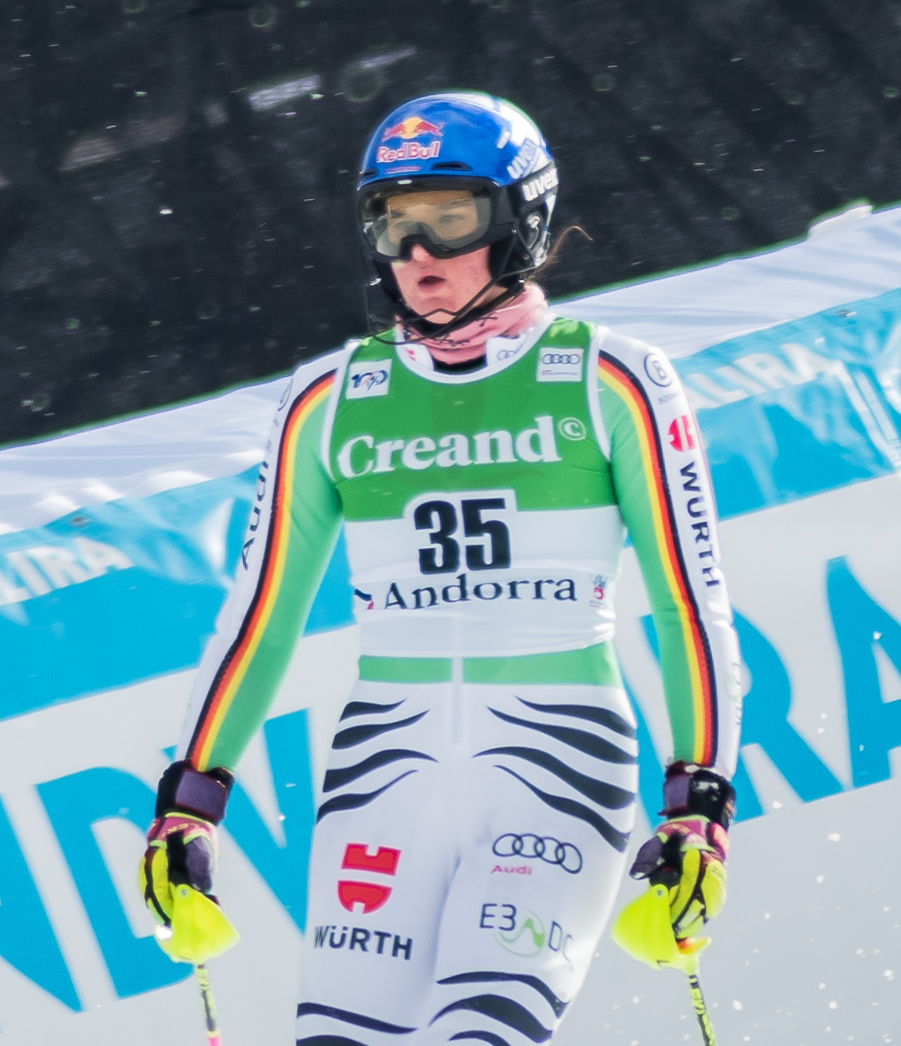
- Aicher in 2024

Personal information
- Full name: Emma Mathilda Aicher
- Born: 13 November 2003 (age 23) Sundsvall, Sweden
- Height: 1.75 m (5 ft 9 in)

Skiing career
- Country: Germany (since 2020); Sweden (until 2020)
- Sport: Alpine skiing
- Club: SC Mahlstetten
- Disciplines: Slalom, Super-G, Downhill, Giant slalom
- World Cup debut: 13 November 2021 (age 18)

Olympics
- Teams: 2 – (2022, 2026)
- Medals: 3 (0 gold)

World Championships
- Teams: 3 – (2021–2025)
- Medals: 1 (0 gold)

World Cup
- Seasons: 6 – (2022–2027)
- Wins: 6 – (2 DH, 3 SG, 1 SL)
- Podiums: 15 – (4 DH, 4 SG, 1 GS, 6 SL)
- Overall titles: 0 – (2nd in 2026)
- Discipline titles: 0 – (2nd in DH, 2026)
Medal record
Womn's alpine skiing
Representing Germany
World Cup race podiums
Event	1st	2nd	3rd
Slalom	1	1	4
Giant slalom	0	0	1
Super-G	3	1	0
Downhill	2	2	0
Total	6	4	5
Olympic Games
Silver medal – second place	2022 Beijing	Team event
Silver medal – second place	2026 Milano Cortina	Downhill
Silver medal – second place	2026 Milano Cortina	Team combined
World Championships
Bronze medal – third place	2021 Cortina d'Ampezzo	Team event
World Junior Championships
Silver medal – second place	2022 Panorama	Downhill
Silver medal – second place	2022 Panorama	Slalom
Silver medal – second place	2022 Panorama	Giant Slalom
Silver medal – second place	2023 St. Anton	Team combined

Emma Mathilda Aicher (born 13 November 2003) is a Swedish-born German World Cup alpine ski racer. She competes in all disciplines and represents Germany.

Aicher's achievements include two Olympic silver medals and a bronze medal in the World Championships. Her first World Cup podium came in a downhill in February 2025. One day later, she won her first race, also a downhill.

At the 2026 Winter Olympics in Italy, Aicher won two silver medals; one in downhill and the other in team combined with Kira Weidle-Winkelmann, with Aicher skiing the slalom portion.

== Career ==
A daughter of a Swedish mother and a German father, Aicher grew up in Sundsvall, Sweden, where she started skiing and joined the local ski club. Later, she moved with her parents to Engelberg, Switzerland, and then back to Sundsvall. She holds both Swedish and German citizenship.

In March 2019, Aicher won the U16 Slalom of the FIS Children Cup, representing Sweden. Later that year, she took part in her first FIS races. In 2020, she joined the German Ski Association, for the reason of "better training opportunities in the Alps". Making her debut in the Europa Cup in December 2020, she took her first podium in slalom in January 2021.

Three weeks later, Aicher represented Germany at the World Championships, where she won bronze in the team event. That November on her eighteenth birthday, she made her World Cup debut in a parallel giant slalom at Lech/Zürs, Austria.

Without a top 30 result in World Cup downhill through January 2025, Aicher finished sixth in both downhill and super-G at the World Championships in early February. Three weeks later at a pair of downhill races in Kvitfjell, Norway, she gained her first World Cup podium and followed it up with a victory the next day.

On 8 February 2026, Aicher won a silver medal in the downhill Alpine skiing event at the Olimpia delle Tofane in Cortina d'Ampezzo at the 2026 Winter Olympics with a time of 1:36.14. Two days later, she achieved the top time of 44.38 in the slalom event of alpine combined at the same skiing center, securing another silver medal with teammate Kira Weidle-Winkelmann.

== World Cup results ==
=== Season standings ===
Season
Season	Age	Overall	Slalom	Giant slalom	Super-G	Downhill	Parallel
2022	18	71	28	—	—	—	19
2023	19	40	23	—	28	29	—N/a
2024	20	48	35	39	28	27	—N/a
2025	21	15	17	41	15	9	—N/a
2026	22	2nd place, silver medalist(s)	6	18	3rd place, bronze medalist(s)	2nd place, silver medalist(s)	—N/a
2027	23	1	1	3	—	—	—N/a

Standings through 14 November 2026

=== Race podiums ===
- 6 wins (2 DH, 3 SG, 1 SL)
- 15 podiums (4 DH, 4 SG, 1 GS, 6 SL); 37 top tens

Season
Season	Date	Location	Discipline	Place
2025	28 February 2025	Kvitfjell, Norway	Downhill	2nd
2025	1 March 2025	Kvitfjell, Norway	Downhill	1st
2025	13 March 2025	La Thuile, Italy	Super-G	1st
2026	15 November 2025	Levi, Finland	Slalom	3rd
2026	13 December 2025	St. Moritz, Switzerland	Downhill	1st
2026	16 December 2025	Courchevel, France	Slalom	3rd
2026	18 January 2026	Tarvisio, Italy	Super-G	1st
2026	25 January 2026	(Czech Republic) Špindlerův Mlýn, Czech Republic	Slalom	3rd
2026	28 February 2026	Soldeu, Andorra	Super-G	1st
2026	1 March 2026	Soldeu, Andorra	Super-G	2nd
2026	6 March 2026	Val di Fassa, Italy	Downhill	2nd
2026	15 March 2026	Åre, Sweden	Slalom	2nd
2026	24 March 2026	Hafjell, Norway	Slalom	3rd
2027	24 October 2026	Sölden, Austria	Giant slalom	3rd
2027	14 November 2026	Levi, Finland	Slalom	1st

== World Championship results ==
Year
Year	Age	Slalom	Giant slalom	Super-G	Downhill	Combined	Team combined	Parallel	Team event
2021	17	DNF2	—	—	—	—	—N/a	19	3
2023	19	21	31	—	DNF	8	—N/a	—	—
2025	21	DNF1	23	6	6	—N/a	17	—N/a	—

== Olympic results ==
Year
Year	Age	Slalom	Giant slalom	Super-G	Downhill	Combined	Team combined	Team event
2022	18	18	21	—	—	—	—N/a	2
2026	22	9	19	DNF	2	—N/a	2	—N/a
