= Alexis Monney =

Swiss alpine skier (born 2000)

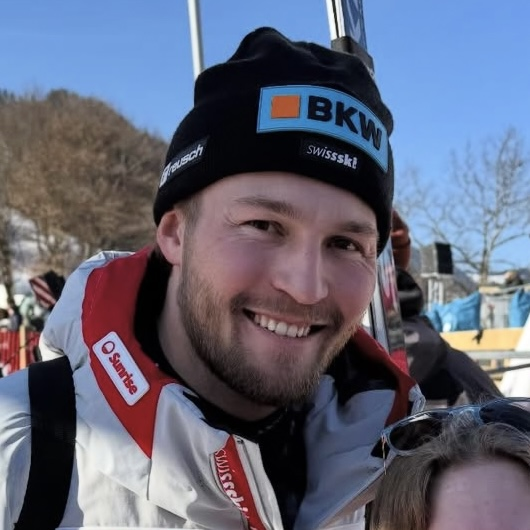
- At Kitzbühel in 2026

Personal information
- Born: 8 January 2000 (age 26) Saint-Martin, Fribourg, Switzerland
- Height: 1.82 m (6 ft 0 in)

Skiing career
- Country: Switzerland
- Sport: Alpine skiing
- Club: SC Châtel-Saint-Denis
- Disciplines: Downhill, Super-G
- World Cup debut: 18 December 2021 (age 21)

Olympics
- Teams: 1 – (2026)
- Medals: 0

World Championships
- Teams: 2 – (2023, 2025)
- Medals: 2 (0 gold)

World Cup
- Seasons: 5 – (2022–2026)
- Wins: 1 – (1 DH)
- Podiums: 7 – (4 DH, 3 SG)
- Overall titles: 0 – (9th in 2025)
- Discipline titles: 0 – (3rd in DH, 2025)
Medal record
Men's alpine skiing
Representing Switzerland
World Championships
Silver medal – second place	2025 Saalbach	Team combined
Bronze medal – third place	2025 Saalbach	Downhill

Alexis Monney (French pronunciation: [alɛksi mɔnɛ]; born 8 January 2000) is a Swiss World Cup alpine ski racer who specializes in the speed events of downhill and super-G.

== Early life ==
Monney is from Châtel-Saint-Denis in the Swiss canton of Fribourg.

== Career ==
Monney won the gold medal in downhill at the Junior World Championships in March 2020.

In December 2024, Monney gained his first World Cup win at the downhill at Bormio. and was the runner-up at Kitzbühel a month later. At the World Championships in February 2025, he won the bronze medal in the downhill, and silver in the team combined with Tanguy Nef.

== World Cup results ==
=== Season standings ===
Season
Season	Age	Overall	Slalom	Giant slalom	Super-G	Downhill
2022	22	150	—	—	—	53
2023	23	73	—	—	54	27
2024	24	60	—	—	42	20
2025	25	9	—	—	8	3
2026	26	14	—	—	9	7

=== Race podiums ===
- 1 win (1 DH)
- 7 podiums (4 DH, 3 SG), 18 top tens

Season
Season	Date	Location	Discipline	Place
2025	28 December 2024	Bormio, Italy	Downhill	1st
2025	29 December 2024	Bormio, Italy	Super-G	3rd
2025	25 January 2025	Kitzbühel, Austria	Downhill	2nd
2025	22 February 2025	Crans-Montana, Switzerland	Downhill	3rd
2025	23 February 2025	Crans-Montana, Switzerland	Super-G	2nd
2026	27 December 2025	Livigno, Italy	Super-G	2nd
2026	28 February 2026	Garmisch, Germany	Downhill	2nd

== World Championship results ==
Year
Year	Age	Slalom	Giant slalom	Super-G	Downhill	Combined	Team combined	Parallel	Team event
2023	23	—	—	—	18	—	—N/a	—	—
2025	25	—	—	DNF	3	—N/a	2	—N/a	—

== Olympic results ==
Year
Year	Age	Slalom	Giant slalom	Super-G	Downhill	Team combined
2026	26	—	—	10	5	13
