= FIS Alpine World Ski Championships 2025 – Men's team combined =

Men's team combined at the FIS Alpine World Ski Championships 2025
- Venue: Skicircus Saalbach-Hinterglemm/Leogang
- Location: Saalbach-Hinterglemm, Austria
- Dates: 12 February
- Competitors: 74 from 18 nations
- Teams: 37
- Winning time: 2:42.38

Medalists
gold medal	Franjo von Allmen; Loïc Meillard	Switzerland
silver medal	Alexis Monney; Tanguy Nef	Switzerland
bronze medal	Stefan Rogentin; Marc Rochat	Switzerland

Men's Team Combined Downhill
- Location: Schneekristall/Zwolfer; Saalbach, Austria
- Vertical: 912 m (2,992 ft)
- Top elevation: 1,984 m (6,509 ft)
- Base elevation: 1,072 m (3,517 ft)
- Longest run: 2.918 km (1.81 mi)

Men's Team Combined Slalom
- Location: Ulli Maier; Saalbach, Austria
- Vertical: 218 m (715 ft)
- Top elevation: 1,279 m (4,196 ft)
- Base elevation: 1,061 m (3,481 ft)

The Men's team combined competition at the FIS Alpine World Ski Championships 2025 was held on 12 February 2025.

== Results ==
The first run was started at 10:00 and the second run at 13:15.

Rank	Bib	Team	Time	Behind
1st place, gold medalist(s)	15	Switzerland 1 Franjo von Allmen; Loïc Meillard	2:42.38; 1:42.11; 1:00.27	—
2nd place, silver medalist(s)	9	Switzerland 2 Alexis Monney; Tanguy Nef	2:42.65; 1:42.09; 1:00.56	+0.27
3rd place, bronze medalist(s)	10	Switzerland 4 Stefan Rogentin; Marc Rochat	2:42.81; 1:43.17; 59.64	+0.43
4	11	United States 1 Ryan Cochran-Siegle; Benjamin Ritchie	2:43.07; 1:43.35; 59.72	+0.69
5	17	Austria 2 Daniel Hemetsberger; Fabio Gstrein	2:43.18; 1:43.04; 1:00.14	+0.80
6	4	Italy 2 Florian Schieder; Tobias Kastlunger	2:43.31; 1:43.06; 1:00.25	+0.93
7	13	Italy 3 Mattia Casse; Stefano Gross	2:43.45; 1:43.10; 1:00.35	+1.07
8	25	Germany; Simon Jocher; Linus Straßer	2:43.58; 1:44.16; 59.42	+1.20
9	3	Norway 2 Adrian Smiseth Sejersted; Timon Haugan	2:43.68; 1:43.14; 1:00.54	+1.30
10	5	France 4 Matthieu Bailet; Victor Muffat-Jeandet	2:43.86; 1:43.87; 59.99	+1.48
11	27	Sweden; Felix Monsén; Kristoffer Jakobsen	2:44.21; 1:46.42; 57.79	+1.83
12	1	France 2 Maxence Muzaton; Steven Amiez	2:44.48; 1:43.22; 1:01.26	+2.10
13	23	Estonia; Juhan Luik; Tormis Laine	2:45.16; 1:45.45; 59.71	+2.78
14	20	France 3 Nils Alphand; Paco Rassat	2:45.17; 1:44.33; 1:00.84	+2.79
15	8	United States 2 Bryce Bennett; Jett Seymour	2:45.30; 1:45.11; 1:00.19	+2.92
16	26	Czech Republic 1 Jan Zabystřan; Kryštof Krýzl	2:45.52; 1:43.40; 1:02.12	+3.14
17	2	Canada; Brodie Seger; Erik Read	2:45.88; 1:45.06; 1:00.82	+3.50
18	22	Slovenia; Nejc Naraločnik; Miha Oserban	2:46.29; 1:44.62; 1:01.67	+3.91
19	24	Finland 2 Jaakko Tapanainen; Jesper Pohjolainen	2:47.40; 1:47.06; 1:00.34	+5.02
20	36	Czech Republic 3 Patrik Forejtek; Marek Müller	2:47.76; 1:46.76; 1:01.00	+5.38
20	32	Israel; Barnabás Szőllős; Benjamin Szőllős	2:47.76; 1:45.27; 1:02.49	+5.38
22	21	Slovakia; Matej Prieložný; Adam Nováček	2:47.79; 1:46.82; 1:00.97	+5.41
23	34	Spain; Ander Mintegui; Joaquim Salarich	2:47.96; 1:46.61; 1:01.35	+5.58
24	29	Latvia; Lauris Opmanis; Elvis Opmanis	2:52.82; 1:47.41; 1:05.41	+10.44
25	35	Ukraine 1 Taras Filiak; Roman Tsybelenko	2:57.65; 1:49.09; 1:08.56	+15.27
26	33	Ukraine 2 Ivan Kovbasnyuk; Dmytro Shepiuk	2:58.20; 1:51.14; 1:07.06	+15.82
27	37	Ukraine 3 Maksym Mariichyn; Artem Soldatenko	3:01.95; 1:49.17; 1:12.78	+19.57
	6	Italy 1 Dominik Paris; Alex Vinatzer	— 1:42.55; DNF	Did not finish
	7	Switzerland 3 Justin Murisier; Daniel Yule	— 1:43.23; DNF	Did not finish
	12	France 1 Nils Allègre; Clément Noël	— 1:43.24; DNF	Did not finish
	14	Austria 1 Vincent Kriechmayr; Manuel Feller	— 1:43.40; DNF	Did not finish
	19	Italy 4 Christof Innerhofer; Filippo Della Vite	— 1:43.71; DNF	Did not finish
	28	Austria 4 Stefan Eichberger; Dominik Raschner	— 1:43.90; DNF	Did not finish
	18	Finland 1 Elian Lehto; Eduard Hallberg	— 1:44.31; DNF	Did not finish
	16	Austria 3 Stefan Babinsky; Marco Schwarz	— 1:44.55; DNF	Did not finish
	30	Norway 1 Fredrik Møller; Atle Lie McGrath	— 1:48.28; DNF	Did not finish
	31	Czech Republic 2 Jan Koula; Aldo Tomášek	— DNF —	Did not finish
