= Stefan Babinsky =

Austrian alpine skier (born 1996)

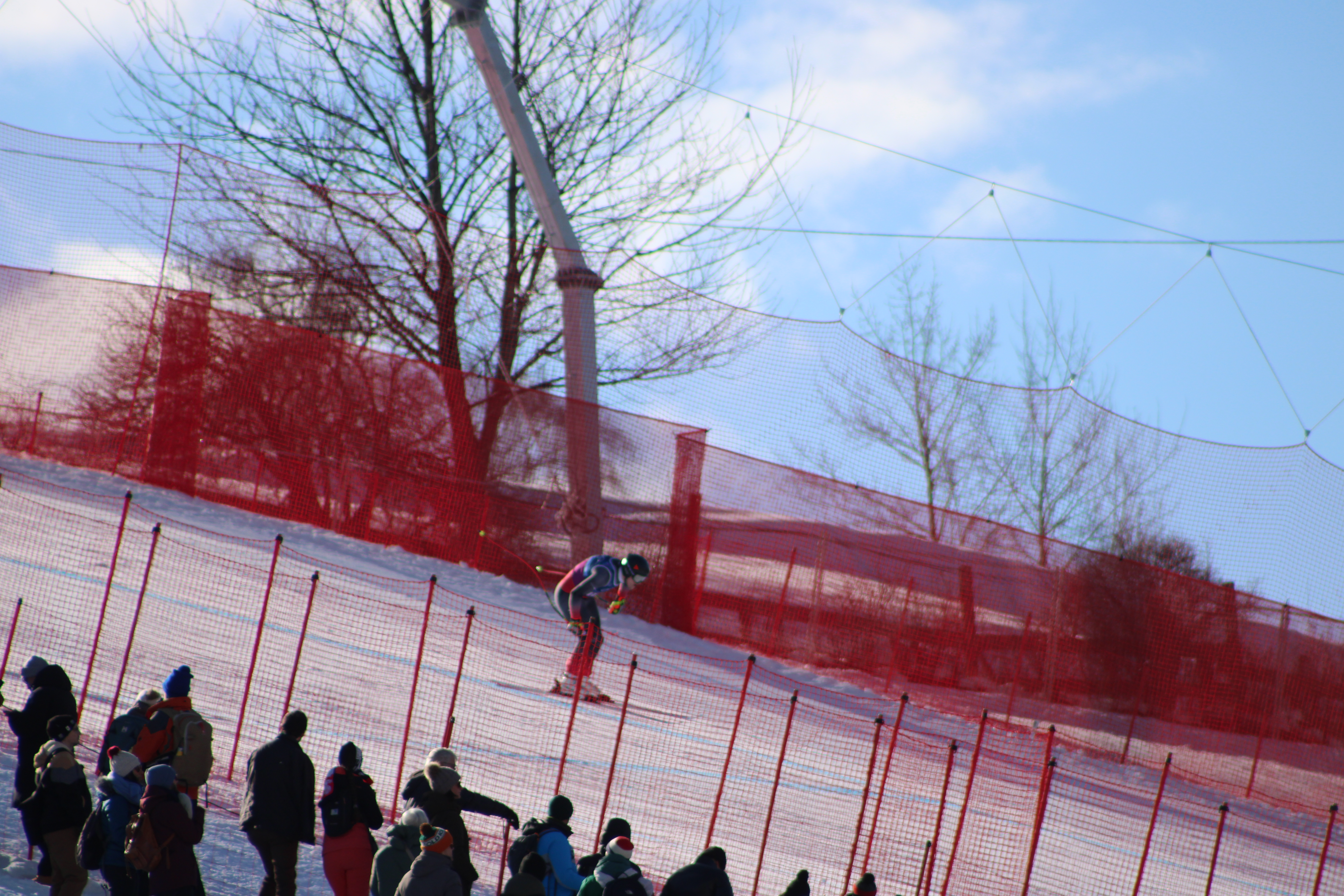
- Babinsky at the 2026 Winter Olympics

Personal information
- Born: 2 April 1996 (age 30) Bremen, Germany

Skiing career
- Country: Austria
- Sport: Alpine skiing
- Club: SV Skiclub Gaal
- Disciplines: Speed events
- World Cup debut: December 2019 (age 23)

Olympics
- Teams: 1 – (2026)
- Medals: 0

World Championships
- Teams: 2 – (2023, 2025)
- Medals: 0

World Cup
- Seasons: 7 – (2020–2026)
- Wins: 0
- Podiums: 2 – (2 SG)
- Overall titles: 0 – (37th in 2024)
- Discipline titles: 0 – (7th in SG, 2026)
Medal record
Men's alpine skiing
Representing Austria
World Junior Championships
| Silver medal – second place | 2016 Sochi | Downhill |

Stefan Babinsky (born 2 April 1996) is an Austrian World Cup alpine ski racer who competes in the speed events of downhill and super-G.

== Career ==
Born in Bremen, Germany, Babinsky hails from Seckau, Styria, and made his World Cup debut in December 2019. His first two World Cup podiums came in January 2026, both in super-G.

== World Cup results ==
=== Season standings ===
Season
| Season | Age | Overall | Slalom | Giant slalom | Super-G | Downhill | Combined |
| 2020 | 23 | 123 | — | — | 40 | — | 36 |
| 2021 | 24 | 85 | — | — | 27 | — | —N/a |
| 2022 | 25 | 88 | — | — | 28 | 54 | —N/a |
| 2023 | 26 | 47 | — | — | 10 | 53 | —N/a |
| 2024 | 27 | 37 | — | — | 15 | 15 | —N/a |
| 2025 | 28 | 39 | — | — | 21 | 19 | —N/a |
| 2026 | 29 | 23 | — | — | 7 | 28 | —N/a |

=== Top-ten results ===
- 0 wins
- 2 podiums (2 SG), 17 top tens (13 SG, 4 DH)

Season
| Season | Date | Location | Discipline | Place |
| 2021 | 25 January 2021 | Kitzbühel, Austria | Super-G | 7th |
| 2023 | 29 December 2022 | Bormio, Italy | Super-G | 9th |
| 2023 | 28 January 2023 | Cortina d'Ampezzo, Italy | Super-G | 4th |
| 2023 | 5 March 2023 | Aspen, United States | Super-G | 4th |
| 2024 | 14 December 2023 | Val Gardena, Italy | Downhill | 6th |
| 2024 | 29 December 2023 | Bormio, Italy | Super-G | 6th |
| 2024 | 12 January 2024 | Wengen, Switzerland | Super-G | 6th |
| 2024 | 20 January 2024 | Kitzbühel, Austria | Downhill | 4th |
| 2024 | 28 January 2024 | Garmisch-Partenkirchen, Germany | Super-G | 8th |
| 2025 | 29 December 2024 | Bormio, Italy | Super-G | 10th |
| 2025 | 25 January 2025 | Kitzbühel, Austria | Downhill | 8th |
| 2025 | 7 March 2025 | Kvitfjell, Norway | Downhill | 9th |
| 2025 | 23 March 2025 | Sun Valley, United States | Super-G | 9th |
| 2026 | 11 November 2025 | Copper Mountain, United States | Super-G | 4th |
| 2026 | 5 December 2025 | Beaver Creek, United States | Super-G | 9th |
| 2026 | 16 January 2026 | Wengen, Switzerland | Super-G | 2nd |
| 2026 | 23 January 2026 | Kitzbühel, Austria | Super-G | 3rd |

== World Championship results ==
Year
| Year | Age | Slalom | Giant slalom | Super-G | Downhill | Combined | Team combined |
| 2023 | 26 | — | — | 15 | 32 | DNF2 | —N/a |
| 2025 | 28 | — | — | 6 | 9 | —N/a | DNF2 |

== Olympic results ==
Year
| Year | Age | Slalom | Giant slalom | Super-G | Downhill | Team combined |
| 2026 | 29 | — | — | 21 | 26 | 8 |
