= Černá Svatý Petr =

Ski course in the Czech Republic

- Interactive map of Černá Svatý Petr
- Location within Europe Location within Czech Republic
- 50°43′09″N 15°36′52″E
- Location: Špindlerův Mlýn, Czech Republic

Giant slalom
- Start: 1,155 m (3,789 ft) (AA)
- Finish: 763 m (2,503 ft)
- Vertical drop: 392 m (1,286 ft)
- Max incline: 33.4 degrees (66%)
- Avg incline: 18.1 degrees (32.7%)

Slalom
- Start: 965 m (3,166 ft) (AA)
- Finish: 763 m (2,503 ft)
- Vertical drop: 202 m (663 ft)
- Max incline: 33.4 degrees (66%)
- Avg incline: 20.3 degrees (37%)
- Min incline: 8.0 degrees (14%)

Černá Svatý Petr (english: Black Saint Peter; previous names: Černá, Black course, Black Course Sv Petr), is a women's World Cup technical ski course at Špindlerův Mlýn in the Czech Republic.

With an average gradient of 14.8 degrees (32.7%), Černá Svatý Petr is not among the most demanding technical courses on the women's World Cup circuit. Its giant slalom course is lengthy and consequently very exhausting.

== History ==
World Cup events for women in slalom and giant slalom have been held periodically on Černá Svatý Petr since the 2006 season. The circuit returned in 2008, 2011, 2019, 2023, and 2026.

The most successful racers on this slope is Mikaela Shiffrin, who won record 3 times in total (all in slalom).

== World Cup ==
Mikaela Shiffrin (USA)

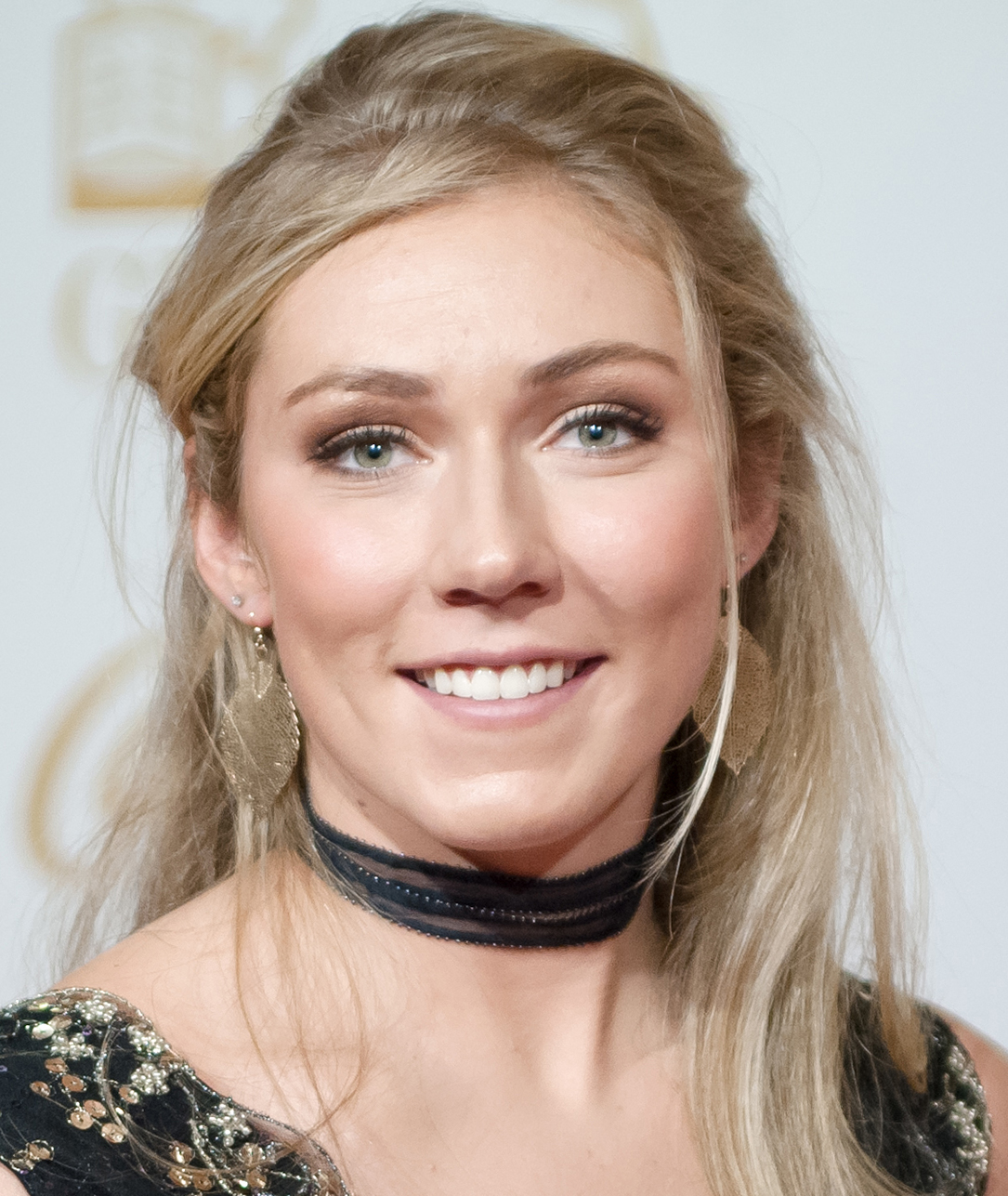
255x

won record 3 SL

=== Women ===
This slope hosted 12 women's World Cup events (7 slaloms and 5 giant slaloms).

No.	Type	Season	Date	Winner	Second	Third
1155	GS	2005/06	21 December 2005	(Croatia) Janica Kostelić	(Austria) Kathrin Zettel	(Austria) Marlies Schild
1156	SL	2005/06	22 December 2005	(Sweden) Anja Pärson	(Croatia) Janica Kostelić	(Austria) Marlies Schild
1231	GS	2007/08	5 January 2008	(Italy) Denise Karbon	(Finland) Tanja Poutiainen	(Austria) Elisabeth Görgl
1232	SL	2007/08	6 January 2008	(Austria) Marlies Schild	(Slovakia) Veronika Zuzulová	(Germany) Maria Riesch
1347	GS	2010/11	11 March 2011	(Germany) Viktoria Rebensburg	(Italy) Denise Karbon	(United States) Lindsey Vonn
1348	SL	2010/11	12 March 2011	(Austria) Marlies Schild	(Austria) Kathrin Zettel	(Slovenia) Tina Maze
1631	GS	2018/19	8 March 2019	(Slovakia) Petra Vlhová	(Germany) Viktoria Rebensburg	(United States) Mikaela Shiffrin
1632	SL	2018/19	9 March 2019	(United States) Mikaela Shiffrin	(Switzerland) Wendy Holdener	(Slovakia) Petra Vlhová
	GS	2022/23	28 January 2023	cancelled and moved to Kronplatz on 25 January 2023		
1761	SL	2022/23	28 January 2023	(United States) Mikaela Shiffrin	(Germany) Lena Dürr	(Switzerland) Wendy Holdener
1762	SL	2022/23	29 January 2023	(Germany) Lena Dürr	(United States) Mikaela Shiffrin	(Croatia) Zrinka Ljutić
1861	GS	2025/26	24 January 2026	(Sweden) Sara Hector	(United States) Paula Moltzan	(United States) Mikaela Shiffrin
1862	SL	2025/26	25 January 2026	(United States) Mikaela Shiffrin	(Switzerland) Camille Rast	(Germany) Emma Aicher

Not in original scheduled. Replacement for Zagreb (2023).
