= FIS Alpine World Ski Championships 2025 – Men's downhill =

Men's downhill at the FIS Alpine World Ski Championships 2025
- Venue: Skicircus Saalbach-Hinterglemm/Leogang
- Location: Saalbach-Hinterglemm, Austria
- Dates: 9 February
- Competitors: 56 from 21 nations
- Winning time: 1:40.68

Medalists
gold medal	Franjo von Allmen	Switzerland
silver medal	Vincent Kriechmayr	Austria
bronze medal	Alexis Monney	Switzerland

Men's Downhill
- Location: Schneekristall/Zwolfer; Saalbach, Austria
- Vertical: 912 m (2,992 ft)
- Top elevation: 1,984 m (6,509 ft)
- Base elevation: 1,072 m (3,517 ft)
- Longest run: 2.918 km (1.81 mi)

The Men's downhill competition at the FIS Alpine World Ski Championships 2025 was held on Sunday, 9 February 2025.

Switzerland's Franjo von Allmen won the gold medal, Vincent Kriechmayr of Austria took the silver, and the bronze medalist was Alexis Monney of Switzerland.

The race course was 2.918 km (1.81 mi) in length, with a vertical drop of 912 m (2,992 ft) from a starting elevation of 1,984 m (6,509 ft) above sea level. Von Allmen's winning time of 100.68 seconds yielded an average speed of 104.338 km/h (64.8 mph) and an average vertical descent rate of 9.058 m/s (29.7 ft/s).

== Results ==
The race was started at 11:30 CET (UTC+1) under partly cloudy skies; the snow was hard and the air temperature was 4 °C (39 °F) at the start and 3 °C (37 °F) at the finish.

Rank	Bib	Name	Country	Time	Diff
1st place, gold medalist(s)	11	Franjo von Allmen	Switzerland	1:40.68	—
2nd place, silver medalist(s)	9	Vincent Kriechmayr	Austria	1:40.92	+0.24
3rd place, bronze medalist(s)	8	Alexis Monney	Switzerland	1:40.99	+0.31
4	12	Dominik Paris	Italy	1:41.13	+0.45
5	13	Marco Odermatt	Switzerland	1:41.34	+0.66
6	17	Adrian Smiseth Sejersted	Norway	1:41.51	+0.83
7	18	Daniel Hemetsberger	Austria	1:41.59	+0.91
8	14	Justin Murisier	Switzerland	1:41.97	+1.29
9	16	Stefan Babinsky	Austria	1:41.99	+1.31
10	10	Bryce Bennett	United States	1:42.02	+1.34
10	6	Nils Allègre	France	1:42.02	+1.34
12	2	Stefan Rogentin	Switzerland	1:42.06	+1.38
13	5	Ryan Cochran-Siegle	United States	1:42.11	+1.43
14	23	Elian Lehto	Finland	1:42.16	+1.48
15	37	Fredrik Møller	Norway	1:42.23	+1.55
16	20	Florian Schieder	Italy	1:42.32	+1.64
16	32	Felix Monsén	Sweden	1:42.32	+1.64
18	3	Maxence Muzaton	France	1:42.34	+1.66
19	28	Jan Zabystřan	Czech Republic	1:42.38	+1.70
20	19	Romed Baumann	Germany	1:42.43	+1.75
21	25	Giovanni Franzoni	Italy	1:42.47	+1.79
22	1	Mattia Casse	Italy	1:42.49	+1.81
23	7	James Crawford	Canada	1:42.54	+1.86
24	22	Nils Alphand	France	1:42.80	+2.12
24	21	Jared Goldberg	United States	1:42.80	+2.12
26	36	Marco Pfiffner	Liechtenstein	1:42.85	+2.17
27	29	Brodie Seger	Canada	1:42.90	+2.22
28	26	Stefan Eichberger	Austria	1:42.91	+2.23
29	31	Jeffrey Read	Canada	1:43.04	+2.36
30	24	Simon Jocher	Germany	1:43.08	+2.40
31	34	Henrik von Appen	Chile	1:43.18	+2.50
32	4	Adrien Théaux	France	1:43.29	+2.61
33	33	Nejc Naraločnik	Slovenia	1:43.37	+2.69
34	30	Martin Čater	Slovenia	1:43.40	+2.72
35	40	Rok Ažnoh	Slovenia	1:43.56	+2.88
36	27	Sam Morse	United States	1:43.76	+3.08
37	48	Barnabás Szőllős	Israel	1:44.52	+3.84
38	42	Jaakko Tapanainen	Finland	1:44.60	+3.92
39	43	Juhan Luik	Estonia	1:45.33	+4.65
40	39	Nico Gauer	Liechtenstein	1:45.95	+5.27
41	46	Jan Koula	Czech Republic	1:46.02	+5.34
42	44	Lauris Opmanis	Latvia	1:46.24	+5.56
43	45	Matej Prieložný	Slovakia	1:46.71	+6.03
44	52	Patrik Forejtek	Czech Republic	1:46.79	+6.11
45	41	Tiziano Gravier	Argentina	1:46.89	+6.21
46	54	Nicolás Quintero	Argentina	1:49.33	+8.65
47	51	Taras Filiak	Ukraine	1:49.72	+9.04
48	53	Elvis Opmanis	Latvia	1:49.93	+9.25
49	55	Roman Tsybelenko	Ukraine	1:50.59	+9.91
50	56	Maksym Mariichyn	Ukraine	1:51.03	+10.35
	15	Miha Hrobat	Slovenia	Did not finish	
	35	Luis Vogt	Germany	Did not finish	
	38	Adur Etxezarreta	Spain	Did not finish	
	47	Riley Seger	Canada	Did not finish	
	49	Ivan Kovbasnyuk	Ukraine	Did not finish	
	50	Ander Mintegui	Spain	Did not finish	
