= Franjo von Allmen =

Swiss alpine skier (born 2001)

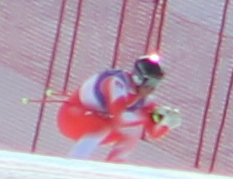
- Winning Olympic downhill gold in 2026 in Bormio

Personal information
- Born: 24 July 2001 (age 25) Boltigen, Bern, Switzerland
- Height: 1.83 m (6 ft 0 in)
- Website: franjovonallmen.ch

Skiing career
- Country: Switzerland
- Sport: Alpine skiing
- Club: Skiclub Boltigen
- Disciplines: Downhill, Super-G
- World Cup debut: 4 March 2023 (age 21)

Olympics
- Teams: 1 – (2026)
- Medals: 3 (3 gold)

World Championships
- Teams: 1 – (2025)
- Medals: 2 (2 gold)

World Cup
- Seasons: 4 – (2023–2026)
- Wins: 5 – (4 DH, 1 SG)
- Podiums: 15 – (9 DH, 6 SG)
- Overall titles: 0 – (4th in 2025)
- Discipline titles: 0 – (2nd in DH, 2025 and 2026)
Medal record
Men's alpine skiing
Representing Switzerland
World Cup race podiums
Event	1st	2nd	3rd
Super-G	1	1	4
Downhill	4	5	0
Total	5	6	4
Olympic Games
Gold medal – first place	2026 Milano Cortina	Downhill
Gold medal – first place	2026 Milano Cortina	Super-G
Gold medal – first place	2026 Milano Cortina	Team combined
World Championships
Gold medal – first place	2025 Saalbach	Downhill
Gold medal – first place	2025 Saalbach	Team combined
Junior World Championships
Silver medal – second place	2022 Panorama	Downhill
Silver medal – second place	2022 Panorama	Super-G
Silver medal – second place	2022 Panorama	Combined

Franjo von Allmen (born 24 July 2001) is a Swiss World Cup alpine ski racer who competes in the speed disciplines of downhill and super-G. Von Allmen won gold medals in three alpine skiing events at the 2026 Winter Olympics: downhill, super-G, and team combined (with Tanguy Nef). He is the first Swiss Olympian to win the super-G and the first athlete since 2002 to win three gold medals at one edition of the games.

== Early life and training ==
Born in Boltigen, Switzerland, von Allmen began skiing at age two, learning at the Jaun Pass. He completed a four-year apprenticeship in carpentry and spent summers working on construction sites. Von Allmen's father died when he was seventeen, leaving the family in a strained financial situation and unable to fund his ski career. A crowdfunding campaign was able to finance his training for another season, when he made the Swiss Olympic team.

His name isn't Franjo as a Croatian variant of Francis, as some speculated during 2026 Winter Olympics, but combination of Franz and Jozef.

== Career ==
Von Allmen made his World Cup debut on 4 March 2023, in a downhill at Aspen in the United States. His first World Cup podium came in January 2024 in a super-G at Garmisch-Partenkirchen, Germany; his first victory was a year later in January 2025, also a super-G, this time on home country snow in Wengen. A few weeks later at the World Championships in Saalbach, Austria, von Allmen won two gold medals — in downhill and team combined with Loïc Meillard.

On 7 February 2026, von Allmen won the first gold medal of the 2026 Winter Olympics, placing first in men's downhill skiing. On 9 February 2026, von Allmen and Tanguy Nef won the gold medal in the team combined event. On 11 February 2026, von Allmen won a third gold medal in super-G. He is the first Swiss winner of the Olympic super-G, the first alpine skier to win three gold medals at one edition of the Olympic Games since Janica Kostelic at the 2002 Winter Olympics, and the first male skier to win three gold medals at one edition of the games since Jean-Claude Killy at the 1968 Winter Olympics.

A local butcher in von Allmen's home village of Boltigen named the sausage "Franjo's Wurst", after him.

== Personal life ==
In the offseason from skiing, von Allmen participates in motocross in Switzerland, France, Italy, and Germany.

== World Cup results ==
=== Season standings ===
Season
Season	Age	Overall	Slalom	Giant slalom	Super-G	Downhill
2023	21	—	—	—	—	—
2024	22	38	—	—	14	17
2025	23	4	—	—	4	2
2026	24	7	—	—	6	2

=== Race podiums ===
- 5 wins – (4 DH, 1 SG)
- 15 podiums – (9 DH, 6 SG), 28 top tens

Season
Season	Date	Location	Discipline	Place
2024	28 January 2024	Garmisch-Partenkirchen, Germany	Super-G	3rd
2025	21 December 2024	Val Gardena, Italy	Downhill	2nd
2025	28 December 2024	Bormio, Italy	Downhill	2nd
2025	17 January 2025	Wengen, Switzerland	Super-G	1st
2025	18 January 2025	Wengen, Switzerland	Downhill	2nd
2025	22 February 2025	Crans-Montana, Switzerland	Downhill	1st
2025	8 March 2025	Kvitfjell, Norway	Downhill	1st
2025	23 March 2025	Sun Valley, United States	Super-G	3rd
2026	18 December 2025	Val Gardena, Italy	Downhill	2nd
2026	20 December 2025	Val Gardena, Italy	Downhill	1st
2026	27 December 2025	Livigno, Italy	Super-G	3rd
2026	16 January 2026	Wengen, Switzerland	Super-G	3rd
2026	23 January 2026	Kitzbühel, Austria	Super-G	2nd
2026	1 February 2026	Crans-Montana, Switzerland	Downhill	1st
2026	21 March 2026	Kvitfjell, Norway	Downhill	2nd

== World Championship results ==
Year
Year	Age	Slalom	Giant slalom	Super-G	Downhill	Team combined	Team event
2025	23	—	—	12	1	1	—

== Olympic results ==
Year
Year	Age	Slalom	Giant slalom	Super-G	Downhill	Team combined
2026	24	—	—	1	1	1
