= Julia Scheib =

Austrian alpine skier (born 1998)

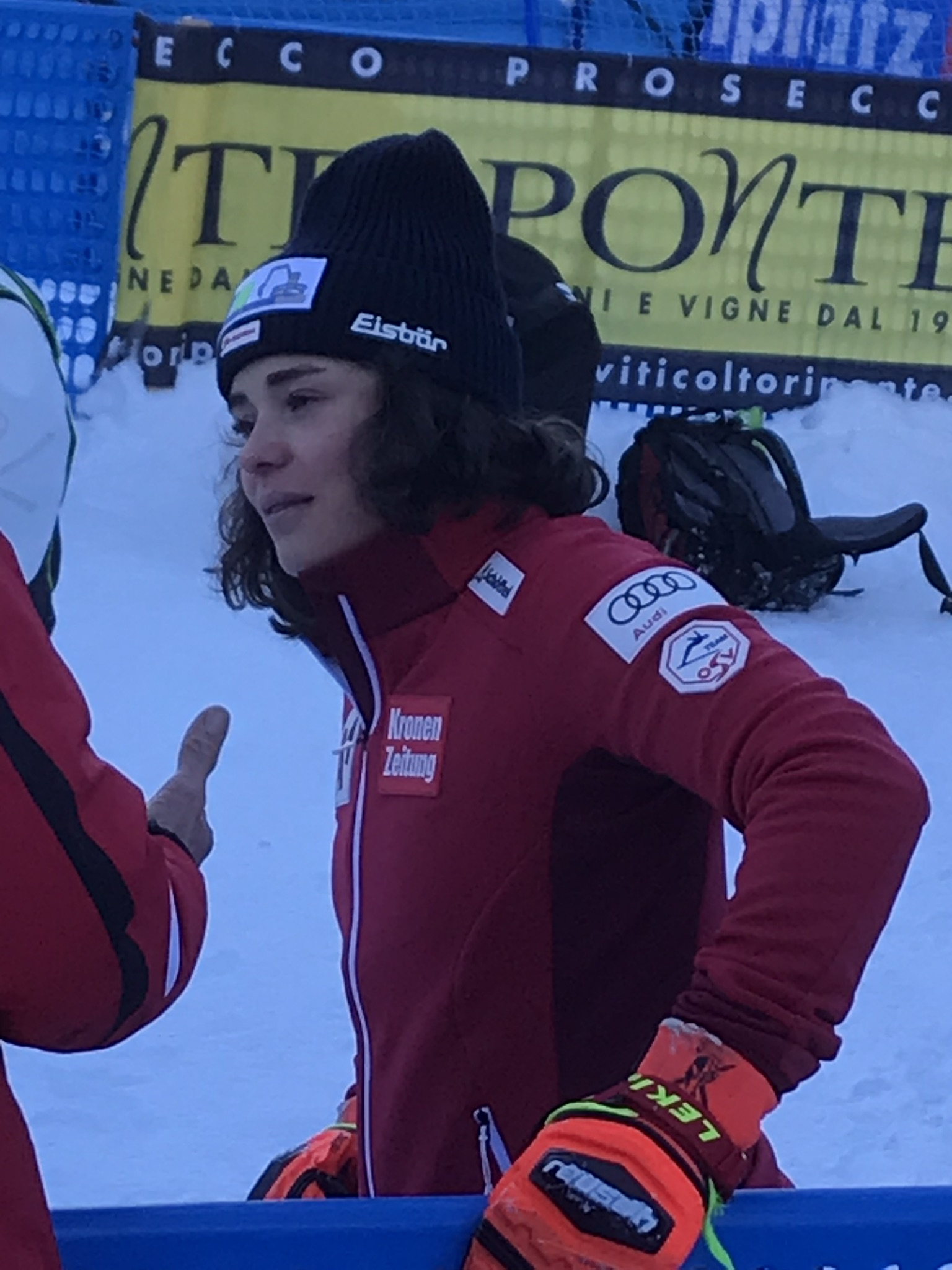
- Scheib in 2023

Personal information
- Born: 12 May 1998 (age 28) Deutschlandsberg, Styria, Austria
- Height: 1.62 m (5 ft 4 in)
- Website: juliascheib.at

Skiing career
- Country: Austria
- Sport: Alpine skiing
- Club: SC Atus Frauental
- Disciplines: Giant slalom, Super-G
- World Cup debut: 23 January 2018 (age 19)

Olympics
- Teams: 1 – (2026)
- Medals: 0

World Championships
- Teams: 2 – (2023, 2025)
- Medals: 0

World Cup
- Seasons: 8 – (2018–2021, 2023–2026)
- Wins: 5 – (5 GS)
- Podiums: 9 – (9 GS) + 1 Team GS
- Overall titles: 0 – (8th in 2026)
- Discipline titles: 1 – (GS – 2026)
Medal record
Women's alpine skiing
Representing Austria
International competitions: Event / 1st / 2nd / 3rd; World Junior Championships / 1 / 1 / 0
World Junior Championships
Gold medal – first place	2018 Davos	Giant slalom
Silver medal – second place	2019 Val di Fassa	Super-G

Julia Scheib (born 12 May 1998) is an Austrian World Cup alpine ski racer who specialises in giant slalom and occasionally competes in super-G. She has five World Cup victories and represented Austria at the 2026 Winter Olympics. In 2026, she won her first crystal globe in giant slalom.

== Early life ==
Scheib grew up in Frauental an der Laßnitz and learned to ski at Kluglifte Hebalm, a one-run ski area nearby. She entered and won her first ski race when she was four years old.

== Career ==
Sheib won a silver medal in super-G at the 2016 Winter Youth Olympics.

She won the gold medal in the giant slalom at the 2018 World Junior Championships.

She made her World Cup debut on 27 October 2018 in the giant slalom at Sölden, Austria and won her first race on the Europa Cup in December. She went to the 2019 World Junior Championships and won the silver in the super-G.

Scheib's first appearance at the World Championships was in Méribel, France, where the Austrian team was fourth in the team event, but she skied out in the second run of the giant slalom. At the end of that season, she earned her first World Cup podium, a third place in the team parallel giant slalom in Soldeu, Andorra.

Her first individual podium was a third place in the giant slalom in October 2024, in the season-opening race in Sölden, Austria. Later that season she competed in the 2025 World Championships in Saalbach, Austria.

Scheib's first World Cup victory came the next season at Sölden, and she followed that up with three more wins (at Tremblant, Semmering, and Kronplatz) along with two second-place finishes. She went to the 2026 Winter Olympics where she finished fifth in the giant slalom. She would lead the giant slalom standings for most of the 2025-26 World Cup, eventually clinching her first discipline title with a round to spare in Åre getting the fifth win of her season and career.

== World Cup results ==
=== Season titles ===
- 1 title (1 Giant slalom)

Season	Discipline
2026	Giant slalom

=== Season standings ===
Season
Season	Age	Overall	Slalom	Giant slalom	Super-G	Downhill
2019	20	124	—	51	—	—
2020	21	104	—	38	—	—
2021	22	92	—	36	52	—
2022	23	torn ACL injured				
2023	24	64	—	24	—	—
2024	25	36	—	12	—	—
2025	26	31	—	9	47	—
2026	27	8	—	1st place, gold medalist(s)	42	—

=== Race podiums ===
- 5 wins - (5 GS)
- 9 podiums - (9 GS) plus 1 Team GS

Season
Season	Date	Location	Discipline	Place
2023	17 March 2023	Soldeu, Andorra	Team giant slalom	3rd
2025	26 October 2024	Sölden, Austria	Giant slalom	3rd
2026	25 October 2025	Sölden, Austria	Giant slalom	1st
2026	29 November 2025	Copper Mountain, United States	Giant slalom	2nd
2026	7 December 2025	Tremblant, Canada	Giant slalom	1st
2026	27 December 2025	Semmering, Austria	Giant slalom	1st
2026	3 January 2026	Kranjska Gora, Slovenia	Giant slalom	2nd
2026	20 January 2026	Kronplatz, Italy	Giant slalom	1st
2026	14 March 2026	Åre, Sweden	Giant slalom	1st
2026	25 March 2026	Hafjell, Norway	Giant slalom	3rd

== World Championship results ==
Year
Year	Age	Slalom	Giant slalom	Super-G	Downhill	Combined	Team combined	Team event
2023	24	—	DNF2	—	—	—	—N/a	4
2025	26	—	DNF2	—	—	—N/a	—	6

== Olympic results ==
Year
Year	Age	Slalom	Giant slalom	Super-G	Downhill	Team combined
2026	27	—	5	—	—	—
