= Piste Nationale =

Ski course in Crans-Montana, Switzerland

- Interactive map of Piste Nationale
- Location within Switzerland Location within Alps Location within Europe
- 46°19′00″N 7°29′00″E
- Location: Crans-Montana, Switzerland

Downhill
- Start: 2,514 m (8,248 ft) (AA)
- Finish: 1,560 m (5,118 ft)
- Vertical drop: 954 m (3,130 ft)
- Length: 3,600 m (2.24 mi)
- Max incline: 31.4 degrees (61%)
- Avg incline: 15.1 degrees (27%)
- Min incline: 0 degrees (0%)

Super-G
- Start: 2,147 m (7,044 ft) (AA)
- Finish: 1,545 m (5,069 ft)
- Vertical drop: 602 m (1,975 ft)
- Length: 2,220 m (1.38 mi)

Nationale is a World Cup downhill ski course in Crans-Montana, Switzerland, opened 86 years ago in 1940.

Crans-Montana hosted the World Championships in 1987, and Swiss racers (Pirmin Zurbriggen, Maria Walliser, Erika Hess, and Peter Müller) dominated in front of the home crowd, winning eight of the ten events and fourteen of the thirty medals.

In addition to Nationale, two nearby ski courses also hosted events at those World Championships; the nearby "Mont Lachaux" was the women's downhill course and "Chetzeron" in Crans village.

Franjo von Allmen won the most recent men's downhill in February 2026; the full course was used at 3.600 km (2.24 mi) in length, with a vertical drop of 954 m (3,130 ft) from a starting elevation of 2,514 m (8,248 ft). His winning time of 115.00 seconds yielded an average speed of 112.696 km/h (70.0 mph) and an average vertical descent rate of 8.296 m/s (27.2 ft/s).

== Course ==
The course's World Cup debut came in January 1977, with women's events in downhill, slalom, and combined.

The men's World Cup events on this slope premiered in 1979 with slalom.

=== Sections ===
- Dévers De Bellaui
- Cassure De Cry D'er
- Plat De Houlés
- Mur De Mélèzes
- L'Étoile
- Saut Des 4000

== World Championships ==
=== Men's events ===
Event	Type	Date	Gold	Silver	Bronze
1987	KB	(SL) 27 January 1987 (DH) 1 February 1987	(Luxembourg) Marc Girardelli	(Switzerland) Pirmin Zurbriggen	(Austria) Günther Mader
1987	DH	31 January 1987	(Switzerland) Peter Müller	(Switzerland) Pirmin Zurbriggen	(Switzerland) Karl Alpiger
1987	SL	8 February 1987	(West Germany) Frank Wörndl	(Austria) Günther Mader	(West Germany) Armin Bittner

- The men's World Championships combined slalom was held on "Chetzeron" ski course.

=== Women's events ===
Event	Type	Date	Gold	Silver	Bronze
1987	SL	7 February 1987	(Switzerland) Erika Hess	(Austria) Roswitha Steiner	(Socialist Federal Republic of Yugoslavia) Mateja Svet

== World Cup ==
=== Men ===
No.	Type	Season	Date	Winner	Second	Third
295	SL	1978/79	9 January 1979	(West Germany) Christian Neureuther	(Bulgaria) Petar Popangelov	(Italy) Karl Trojer
296	DH	1978/79	14 January 1979	(Switzerland) Toni Bürgler	(Switzerland) Peter Müller	(Canada) Ken Read
297	SL	1978/79	15 January 1979	(Liechtenstein) Paul Frommelt	(Liechtenstein) Andreas Wenzel	(Sweden) Ingemar Stenmark
298	KB	1978/79	15 January 1979	(United States) Phil Mahre	(Liechtenstein) Andreas Wenzel	(Italy) Piero Gros
389	DH	1981/82	21 December 1981	(Canada) Steve Podborski	(Switzerland) Peter Müller	(Canada) Ken Read
545	SG	1985/86	3 February 1986	(Switzerland) Peter Müller	(Switzerland) Pirmin Zurbriggen	(West Germany) Markus Wasmeier
546	KB	1985/86	7 December 1985; 3 February 1986	(Switzerland) Peter Müller	(Italy) Michael Mair	(Switzerland) Karl Alpiger
547	SG	1985/86	5 February 1986	(Luxembourg) Marc Girardelli	(West Germany) Markus Wasmeier	(Switzerland) Peter Müller
758	GS	1991/92	20 March 1992	(Italy) Alberto Tomba	(Norway) Kjetil André Aamodt	(Norway) Didrik Marksten
759	SL	1991/92	22 March 1992	(Italy) Alberto Tomba	(Switzerland) Paul Accola	(Norway) Finn Christian Jagge
814	GS	1993/94	18 January 1994	(Norway) Jan Einar Thorsen	(Slovenia) Mitja Kunc	(Austria) Rainer Salzgeber
967	DH	1997/98	13 March 1998	(Austria) Josef Strobl	(Switzerland) Didier Cuche	(Austria) Fritz Strobl
968	GS	1997/98	14 March 1998	(Austria) Stephan Eberharter	(Austria) Hans Knauß	(Austria) Hermann Maier
969	SL	1997/98	15 March 1998	(Italy) Alberto Tomba	(Norway) Hans Petter Buraas	(Norway) Finn Christian Jagge
1476	SG	2011/12	24 February 2012	(Switzerland) Didier Cuche	(Canada) Jan Hudec	(Austria) Benjamin Raich
1477	SG	2011/12	25 February 2012	(Austria) Benjamin Raich	(France) Adrien Théaux	(Switzerland) Didier Cuche
1478	GS	2011/12	26 February 2012	(Italy) Massimiliano Blardone	(Austria) Marcel Hirscher	(Austria) Hannes Reichelt
1953	DH	2024/25	22 February 2025	(Switzerland) Franjo von Allmen	(Switzerland) Marco Odermatt	(Switzerland) Alexis Monney
1954	SG	2024/25	23 February 2025	(Switzerland) Marco Odermatt	(Switzerland) Alexis Monney	(Italy) Dominik Paris
1992	DH	2025/26	1 February 2026	(Switzerland) Franjo von Allmen	(Italy) Dominik Paris	(United States) Ryan Cochran-Siegle

=== Women ===
No.	Type	Season	Date	Winner	Second	Third
238	DH	1976/77	25 January 1977	(Austria) Brigitte Totschnig	(West Germany) Evi Mittermaier	(Austria) Annemarie Moser-Pröll
239	SL	1976/77	26 January 1977	(France) Perrine Pelen	(Switzerland) Lise-Marie Morerod	(France) Fabienne Serrat
240	KB	1976/77	27 January 1977	(Switzerland) Marie-Theres Nadig	(Austria) Annemarie Moser-Pröll	(Liechtenstein) Hanni Wenzel
340	DH	1980/81	19 January 1981			
341	SL	1980/81	21 January 1981	(Switzerland) Erika Hess	(United States) Christin Cooper	(Liechtenstein) Hanni Wenzel
342	KB	1980/81	21 January 1981	(West Germany) Christa Kinshofer	(Switzerland) Erika Hess	(United States) Christin Cooper
508	DH	1985/86	1 February 1986	(Canada) Laurie Graham	(Switzerland) Brigitte Örtli	(Austria) Katrin Gutensohn
509	DH	1985/86	2 February 1986	(Austria) Katrin Gutensohn	(Switzerland) Maria Walliser	(Switzerland) Zoë Haas
702	SG	1991/92	19 March 1992	(France) Carole Merle	(Norway) Merete Fjeldavlie	(Switzerland) Zoe Haas
703	GS	1991/92	21 March 1992	(France) Carole Merle	(Spain) Blanca Fernández Ochoa	(Switzerland) Corinne Rey-Bellet
844	SL	1996/97	21 December 1996	(New Zealand) Claudia Riegler	(Sweden) Pernilla Wiberg	(France) Patricia Chauvet
899	SL	1997/98	14 March 1998	(Slovenia) Urška Hrovat	(Germany) Martina Ertl	(Germany) Hilde Gerg
900	GS	1997/98	15 March 1998	(Austria) Alexandra Meissnitzer	(Germany) Martina Ertl	(Italy) Deborah Compagnoni
1247	DH	2007/08	8 March 2008	(United States) Lindsey Vonn	(Austria) Renate Götschl	(Italy) Nadia Fanchini
1248	SC	2007/08	9 March 2008	(Sweden) Anja Pärson	(Germany) Maria Riesch	(United States) Lindsey Vonn
	SC	2009/10	5 March 2010	high winds		
1312	DH	2009/10	6 March 2010	(United States) Lindsey Vonn	(Italy) Johanna Schnarf	(Switzerland) Marianne Abderhalden
1313	SG	2009/10	7 March 2010	(Switzerland) Dominique Gisin	(United States) Lindsey Vonn	(United States) Julia Mancuso
