= Li Zeta =

Ski course in Val-d'Isère, France

- Interactive map of Li Zeta
- Location within Northern Italy
- 46°32′00″N 10°08′00″E
- Location: Livigno, Italy

Super-G
- Start: 2,372 m (7,782 ft) (AA)
- Finish: 1,847 m (6,060 ft)
- Vertical drop: 525 m (1,722 ft)
- Length: 1.813 m (5 ft 11.4 in)
- Max incline: 27.5 degrees (52%)

Li Zeta is a World Cup downhill ski course in Livigno, Italy since 2025.

== Sections ==
- Rifugio Costaccia
- Croce Vallandrea
- Stradina Croce
- Muro Larici
- Tea Del Plan
- Plan De Li Zeta

== History ==
Austrian skier Marco Schwarz won inaugurational World Cup event in Livigno with wininning his first super-G in his career.

== World Cup ==
=== Men ===
No.	Type	Season	Date	Winner	Second	Third
1980	SG	2025/26	27 December 2025	(Austria) Marco Schwarz	(Switzerland) Alexis Monney	(Switzerland) Franjo von Allmen
