= 2025–26 FIS Alpine Ski World Cup =

International sports competition

Discipline	Men	Women
Overall	(Switzerland) Marco Odermatt (5)	(United States) Mikaela Shiffrin (6)
Downhill	(Switzerland) Marco Odermatt (3)	(Italy) Laura Pirovano (1)
Super-G	(Switzerland) Marco Odermatt (4)	(Italy) Sofia Goggia (1)
Giant slalom	(Brazil) Lucas Pinheiro Braathen (1)	(Austria) Julia Scheib (1)
Slalom	(Norway) Atle Lie McGrath (1)	(United States) Mikaela Shiffrin (9)
Nations Cup	Switzerland (12)	United States (1)
- Nations Cup Overall: Switzerland (13)

Competition
Edition	60th	60th
Locations	20	21
Individual	36	37
Cancelled	4	2
Rescheduled	4	3

The 2025–26 FIS Alpine Ski World Cup was the 60th season of the World Cup, the highest level of international alpine skiing competition for both men and women, organised by International Ski Federation (FIS).

As usual, the season started in late October at Sölden, Austria, with giant slalom events for both women and men; it concluded on 25 March at Hafjell, Norway.

This season marks the start of higher prize money awards for all World Cup disciplines governed by FIS, including alpine. Additionally, this is the first season in which prize money is paid in euros instead of Swiss francs.

In February, the World Cup season paused for the Winter Olympics in northern Italy, with alpine events scheduled for 7–18 February in Bormio (men) and Cortina d'Ampezzo (women).

== Season overview ==
On 16 November 2025, during the slalom event in Levi, Lucas Pinheiro Braathen became the first skier in history to win an Alpine World Cup race representing Brazil. He had previously won five World Cup races representing Norway.

On 16 November 2025, during the slalom event in Levi, Eduard Hallberg became the first Finnish skier in history to stand on an Alpine World Cup race podium on home snow. It was also the first Finnish podium in 18 years.

On 12 December 2025, during the downhill event in St. Moritz, Lindsey Vonn claimed the 83rd victory of her career, becoming the oldest alpine skier in history, male or female, to win an Alpine World Cup race. Her first and most recent World Cup victories were separated by 21 years. The win also came 7 years, 8 months, and 29 days after her previous victory, which took place in Åre in 2018.

On 14 December 2025, Alice Robinson won super-G in St. Moritz, and became first women's skier in history from Oceania to win a speed event.

On 18 December 2025, Val Gardena hosted 1000th downhill in World Cup history (men and women combined). Marco Odermatt won this event.

On 19 December 2025, Jan Zabystřan took the first ever men's World Cup win for the Czech Republic at the Super-G in Val Gardena.

On 21 December 2025 in Alta Badia, Russian men's skiers returned to the World Cup circuit after a three-year ban, but under an FIS neutral flag.

== Map of World Cup hosts ==
The following list contains all 31 World Cup hosts of the season.

(Austria) Sölden	(Finland) Levi	(Austria) Gurgl	(United States) Copper Mountain
Rettenbach	Levi Black	Kirchenkar	West Encore / Rosi's Run
(United States) Beaver Creek	(France) Val d'Isère	(Canada) Tremblant	(Italy) Val Gardena/Gröden
Birds of Prey	La face de Bellevarde	Flying Mile	Saslong
(Italy) Alta Badia	(Italy) Livigno	(Italy) Madonna di Campiglio	(Switzerland) Adelboden
Gran Risa	Li Zeta	Canalone Miramonti	Chuenisbärgli
(Switzerland) Wengen		(Austria) Kitzbühel	
Lauberhorn	Männlichen	Streif	Ganslern
Europe
Switzerland		Austria	
North America		North Italy	
(Austria) Schladming	(Switzerland) Crans-Montana		(Germany) Garmisch-Partenkirchen
Planai	Mont Lachaux	Piste Nationale	Kandahar 2
(Slovenia) Kranjska Gora	(France) Courchevel	(Norway) Kvitfjell	(Norway) Hafjell
Podkoren 3	L'Éclipse	Olympiabakken	Olympia-loypa
(Switzerland) St. Moritz	(Austria) Semmering	(Austria) Zauchensee	(Austria) Flachau
Corviglia	Panorama	Kälberloch	Hermann-Maier-Weltcupstrecke
(Italy) Tarvisio	(Italy) Kronplatz	(Czech Republic) Špindlerův Mlýn	(Andorra) Soldeu
Di Prampero	Erta	Černá Svatý Petr	Àliga
(Italy) Val di Fassa	(Sweden) Åre	(France) Val d'Isère	(Italy) Cortina d'Ampezzo (W)
			2026 Winter Olympics (7–18 February 2026)
La VolatA	Störtloppsbacken	Piste Oreiller-Killy	(Italy) Bormio (M)

== Men ==
Number of races in World Cup history

Total	DH	SG	GS	SL	AC	PS	PG	CE	K.O.	Winners
2000	549	260	475	561	134	2	8	10	1	320

after SL in Hafjell (25 March 2026)

=== Calendar ===
Event key: DH – Downhill, SL – Slalom, GS – Giant slalom, SG – Super giant slalom
All	No.	Date	Venue (slope %)	Type	Winner	Second	Third	Overall leader	R.
1965	1	26 October 2025	(Austria) Sölden (Rettenbach 68.2%)	GS _{467}	(Switzerland) Marco Odermatt	(Austria) Marco Schwarz	(Norway) Atle Lie McGrath	(Switzerland) Marco Odermatt	
1966	2	16 November 2025	(Finland) Levi (Levi Black 52%)	SL _{551}	(Brazil) Lucas Pinheiro Braathen	(France) Clément Noël	(Finland) Eduard Hallberg	(Switzerland) Marco Odermatt (Brazil) Lucas Pinheiro Braathen	
1967	3	22 November 2025	(Austria) Gurgl (Kirchenkar 60%)	SL _{552}	(France) Paco Rassat	(Belgium) Armand Marchant	(Norway) Atle Lie McGrath	(France) Paco Rassat	
1968	4	27 November 2025	(United States) Copper Mountain (West Encore / Rosi 46%)	SG _{254}	(Switzerland) Marco Odermatt	(Austria) Vincent Kriechmayr	(Austria) Raphael Haaser	(Switzerland) Marco Odermatt	
1969	5	28 November 2025	(United States) Copper Mountain (West Encore / Rosi 46%)	GS _{468}	(Austria) Stefan Brennsteiner	(Norway) Henrik Kristoffersen	(Croatia) Filip Zubčić	(Switzerland) Marco Odermatt	
–		4 December 2025	(United States) Beaver Creek (Note: The finish line in Beaver Creek (DH and SG) was moved above usual finish area due to lack of snow.) (Birds of Prey 68%)	DH _{cnx}	cancelled due to lack of snow (rescheduled to Val Gardena on 18 December)			(Switzerland) Marco Odermatt	—
1970	6	(Note: The men's Beaver Creek competition (downhill) schedule has been changed due to unfavorable weather forecasts from 5 to 4 December)4 December 2025	(United States) Beaver Creek (Birds of Prey 68%)	DH _{541}	(Switzerland) Marco Odermatt	(United States) Ryan Cochran-Siegle	(Norway) Adrian Smiseth Sejersted	(Switzerland) Marco Odermatt	
–		5 December 2025	(United States) Beaver Creek (Birds of Prey 68%)	DH _{cnx}	rescheduled to 4 December due to bad weather forecast			(Switzerland) Marco Odermatt	—
1971	7	(Note: The men's Beaver Creek competition (super-G) schedule has been changed due to unfavorable weather forecasts from 6 to 5 December)5 December 2025	(United States) Beaver Creek (Birds of Prey 68%)	SG _{255}	(Austria) Vincent Kriechmayr	(Norway) Fredrik Møller	(Austria) Raphael Haaser	(Switzerland) Marco Odermatt	
–		6 December 2025	(United States) Beaver Creek (Birds of Prey 68%)	SG _{cnx}	rescheduled to 5 December due to bad weather forecast			(Switzerland) Marco Odermatt	—
1972	8	7 December 2025	(United States) Beaver Creek (Birds of Prey 68%)	GS _{469}	(Switzerland) Marco Odermatt	(Italy) Alex Vinatzer	(Norway) Henrik Kristoffersen	(Switzerland) Marco Odermatt	
1973	9	13 December 2025	(France) Val d'Isère (La face de Bellevarde 71%)	GS _{470}	(Switzerland) Loïc Meillard	(Switzerland) Luca Aerni	(Switzerland) Marco Odermatt	(Switzerland) Marco Odermatt	
1974	10	14 December 2025	(France) Val d'Isère (La face de Bellevarde 71%)	SL _{553}	(Norway) Timon Haugan	(Switzerland) Loïc Meillard	(Norway) Henrik Kristoffersen	(Switzerland) Marco Odermatt	
1975	11	(Note: Cancelled men's downhill in Beaver Creek (4 December) is rescheduled to Val Gardena/Gröden on 18 December.)18 December 2025	(Italy) Val Gardena/Gröden (Saslong 56.9%)	DH _{542}	(Switzerland) Marco Odermatt	(Switzerland) Franjo von Allmen	(Italy) Dominik Paris	(Switzerland) Marco Odermatt	
1976	12	19 December 2025	(Italy) Val Gardena/Gröden (Saslong 56.9%)	SG _{256}	(Czech Republic) Jan Zabystřan	(Switzerland) Marco Odermatt	(Italy) Giovanni Franzoni	(Switzerland) Marco Odermatt	
1977	13	20 December 2025	(Italy) Val Gardena/Gröden (Saslong 56.9%)	DH _{543}	(Switzerland) Franjo von Allmen	(Switzerland) Marco Odermatt	(Italy) Florian Schieder	(Switzerland) Marco Odermatt	
1978	14	21 December 2025	(Italy) Alta Badia (Gran Risa 69%)	GS _{471}	(Austria) Marco Schwarz	(Brazil) Lucas Pinheiro Braathen	(Austria) Stefan Brennsteiner	(Switzerland) Marco Odermatt	
1979	15	22 December 2025	(Italy) Alta Badia (Gran Risa 69%)	SL _{554}	(Norway) Atle Lie McGrath	(France) Clément Noël	(Switzerland) Loïc Meillard	(Switzerland) Marco Odermatt	
1980	16	27 December 2025	(Italy) Livigno (Li Zeta 52%)	SG _{257}	(Austria) Marco Schwarz	(Switzerland) Alexis Monney	(Switzerland) Franjo von Allmen	(Switzerland) Marco Odermatt	
1981	17	7 January 2026	(Italy) Madonna di Campiglio (Canalone Miramonti 60%)	SL _{555}	(France) Clément Noël	(Finland) Eduard Hallberg	(France) Paco Rassat	(Switzerland) Marco Odermatt	
1982	18	10 January 2026	(Switzerland) Adelboden (Chuenisbärgli 60%)	GS _{472}	(Switzerland) Marco Odermatt	(Brazil) Lucas Pinheiro Braathen	(France) Léo Anguenot	(Switzerland) Marco Odermatt	
1983	19	11 January 2026	(Switzerland) Adelboden (Chuenisbärgli 60%)	SL _{556}	(France) Paco Rassat	(Norway) Atle Lie McGrath	(Norway) Henrik Kristoffersen	(Switzerland) Marco Odermatt	
1984	20	16 January 2026	(Switzerland) Wengen (Lauberhorn 90% – Speed) (Männlichen 72% – Technical)	SG _{258}	(Italy) Giovanni Franzoni	(Austria) Stefan Babinsky	(Switzerland) Franjo von Allmen	(Switzerland) Marco Odermatt	
1985	21	17 January 2026	(Switzerland) Wengen (Lauberhorn 90% – Speed) (Männlichen 72% – Technical)	DH _{544}	(Switzerland) Marco Odermatt	(Austria) Vincent Kriechmayr	(Italy) Giovanni Franzoni	(Switzerland) Marco Odermatt	
1986	22	18 January 2026	(Switzerland) Wengen (Lauberhorn 90% – Speed) (Männlichen 72% – Technical)	SL _{557}	(Norway) Atle Lie McGrath	(Brazil) Lucas Pinheiro Braathen	(Norway) Henrik Kristoffersen	(Switzerland) Marco Odermatt	
1987	23	23 January 2026	(Austria) Kitzbühel (Streif 85% – Speed) (Ganslern 70% – Technical)	SG _{259}	(Switzerland) Marco Odermatt	(Switzerland) Franjo von Allmen	(Austria) Stefan Babinsky	(Switzerland) Marco Odermatt	
1988	24	24 January 2026	(Austria) Kitzbühel (Streif 85% – Speed) (Ganslern 70% – Technical)	DH _{545}	(Italy) Giovanni Franzoni	(Switzerland) Marco Odermatt	(France) Maxence Muzaton	(Switzerland) Marco Odermatt	
1989	25	25 January 2026	(Austria) Kitzbühel (Streif 85% – Speed) (Ganslern 70% – Technical)	SL _{558}	(Austria) Manuel Feller	(Switzerland) Loïc Meillard	(Germany) Linus Straßer	(Switzerland) Marco Odermatt	
1990	26	27 January 2026	(Austria) Schladming (Planai 54%)	GS _{473}	(Switzerland) Loïc Meillard	(Brazil) Lucas Pinheiro Braathen	(France) Alban Elezi Cannaferina	(Switzerland) Marco Odermatt	
1991	27	28 January 2026	(Austria) Schladming (Planai 54%)	SL _{559}	(Norway) Henrik Kristoffersen	(Norway) Atle Lie McGrath	(France) Clément Noël	(Switzerland) Marco Odermatt	
1992	28	1 February 2026	(Switzerland) Crans-Montana (Piste Nationale 61%)	DH _{546}	(Switzerland) Franjo von Allmen	(Italy) Dominik Paris	(United States) Ryan Cochran-Siegle	(Switzerland) Marco Odermatt	
2026 Winter Olympics (7 – 16 February • Bormio, Italy)
1993	29	28 February 2026	(Germany) Garmisch-Partenkirchen (Kandahar 2 92%)	DH _{547}	(Switzerland) Marco Odermatt	(Switzerland) Alexis Monney	(Switzerland) Stefan Rogentin	(Switzerland) Marco Odermatt	
–		1 March 2026	(Germany) Garmisch-Partenkirchen (Kandahar 2 92%)	SG _{cnx}	cancelled due to fog (rescheduled to Courchevel on 14 March)			(Switzerland) Marco Odermatt	
1994	30	7 March 2026	(Slovenia) Kranjska Gora (Podkoren 3 59%)	GS _{474}	(Brazil) Lucas Pinheiro Braathen	(Switzerland) Loïc Meillard	(Austria) Stefan Brennsteiner	(Switzerland) Marco Odermatt	
1995	31	8 March 2026	(Slovenia) Kranjska Gora (Podkoren 3 59%)	SL _{560}	(Norway) Atle Lie McGrath	(Norway) Henrik Kristoffersen	(Brazil) Lucas Pinheiro Braathen	(Switzerland) Marco Odermatt	
1996	32	(Note: The men's Courchevel competition (downhill) schedule has been changed from 14 to 13 February to accommodate the rescheduled super-G.)13 March 2026	(France) Courchevel (L'Éclipse 58%)	DH _{548}	(Austria) Vincent Kriechmayr	(Italy) Giovanni Franzoni	(Switzerland) Marco Odermatt	(Switzerland) Marco Odermatt	
–		14 March 2026	(France) Courchevel (L'Éclipse 58%)	DH _{cnx}	rescheduled to 13 March to accommodate rescheduled super-G			(Switzerland) Marco Odermatt	—
–		(Note: Cancelled men's super-G in Garmisch-Partenkirchen (1 March) is rescheduled to Courchevel on 14 March.)14 March 2026	(France) Courchevel (L'Éclipse 58%)	SG _{cnx}	cancelled due to heavy snowfall and fog			(Switzerland) Marco Odermatt	
–		15 March 2026	(France) Courchevel (L'Éclipse 58%)	SG _{cnx}	cancelled due to heavy snowfall			(Switzerland) Marco Odermatt	
World Cup Season Final
1997	33	21 March 2026	(Norway) Kvitfjell (Olympiabakken 64%)	DH _{549}	(Italy) Dominik Paris	(Switzerland) Franjo von Allmen	(Austria) Vincent Kriechmayr	(Switzerland) Marco Odermatt	
1998	34	22 March 2026	(Norway) Kvitfjell (Olympiabakken 64%)	SG _{260}	(Italy) Dominik Paris	(Austria) Vincent Kriechmayr	(Austria) Raphael Haaser	(Switzerland) Marco Odermatt	
1999	35	24 March 2026	(Norway) Hafjell (Olympialøypa 52%)	GS _{475}	(Brazil) Lucas Pinheiro Braathen	(Switzerland) Loïc Meillard	(Norway) Atle Lie McGrath	(Switzerland) Marco Odermatt	
2000	36	25 March 2026	(Norway) Hafjell (Olympialøypa 52%)	SL _{561}	(Norway) Timon Haugan	(Switzerland) Loïc Meillard	(Finland) Eduard Hallberg	(Switzerland) Marco Odermatt	
60th FIS World Cup overall (26 October 2025 – 25 March 2026)					(Switzerland) Marco Odermatt	(Brazil) Lucas Pinheiro Braathen	(Norway) Atle Lie McGrath	Overall	

=== Rankings ===
==== Overall ====
Rank	after all 36 events	Points
	(Switzerland) Marco Odermatt	1626
2	(Brazil) Lucas Pinheiro Braathen	1058
3	(Norway) Atle Lie McGrath	936
4	(Switzerland) Loïc Meillard	923
5	(Norway) Henrik Kristoffersen	821

==== Downhill ====
Rank	after all 9 events	Points
	(Switzerland) Marco Odermatt	706
2	(Switzerland) Franjo von Allmen	515
3	(Italy) Dominik Paris	441
4	(Austria) Vincent Kriechmayr	382
5	(Italy) Giovanni Franzoni	378

==== Super-G ====
Rank	after all 7 events	Points
	(Switzerland) Marco Odermatt	425
2	(Austria) Vincent Kriechmayr	347
3	(Austria) Raphael Haaser	301
4	(Italy) Giovanni Franzoni	285
5	(Italy) Dominik Paris	257

==== Giant slalom ====
Rank	after all 9 events	Points
	(Brazil) Lucas Pinheiro Braathen	547
2	(Switzerland) Marco Odermatt	495
3	(Switzerland) Loïc Meillard	486
4	(Austria) Stefan Brennsteiner	431
5	(Austria) Marco Schwarz	339

==== Slalom ====
Rank	after all 11 events	Points
	(Norway) Atle Lie McGrath	584
2	(France) Clément Noël	520
3	(Brazil) Lucas Pinheiro Braathen	511
4	(Norway) Henrik Kristoffersen	503
5	(Norway) Timon Haugan	499

==== Prize money ====
Rank	after all 36 payouts	euro (€)
1	(Switzerland) Marco Odermatt	741,254
2	(Brazil) Lucas Pinheiro Braathen	359,264
3	(Switzerland) Loïc Meillard	317,325
4	(Norway) Atle Lie McGrath	306,019
5	(Switzerland) Franjo von Allmen	278,922

== Women ==
Number of races in World Cup history

Total	DH	SG	GS	SL	AC	PS	PG	CE	K.O.	Winners
1882	465	287	475	529	106	6	3	10	1	266

after GS in Hafjell (25 March 2026)

=== Calendar ===
Event key: DH – Downhill, SL – Slalom, GS – Giant slalom, SG – Super giant slalom
All	No.	Date	Venue (slope %)	Type	Winner	Second	Third	Overall leader	R.
1846	1	25 October 2025	(Austria) Sölden (Rettenbach 68.2%)	GS _{466}	(Austria) Julia Scheib	(United States) Paula Moltzan	(Switzerland) Lara Gut-Behrami	(Austria) Julia Scheib	
1847	2	15 November 2025	(Finland) Levi (Levi Black 52%)	SL _{520}	(United States) Mikaela Shiffrin	(Albania) Lara Colturi	(Germany) Emma Aicher	(United States) Mikaela Shiffrin	
1848	3	23 November 2025	(Austria) Gurgl (Kirchenkar 60%)	SL _{521}	(United States) Mikaela Shiffrin	(Albania) Lara Colturi	(Switzerland) Camille Rast	(United States) Mikaela Shiffrin	
1849	4	29 November 2025	(United States) Copper Mountain (West Encore / Rosi 46%)	GS _{467}	(New Zealand) Alice Robinson	(Austria) Julia Scheib	(Norway) Thea Louise Stjernesund	(United States) Mikaela Shiffrin	
1850	5	30 November 2025	(United States) Copper Mountain (West Encore / Rosi 46%)	SL _{522}	(United States) Mikaela Shiffrin	(Germany) Lena Dürr	(Albania) Lara Colturi	(United States) Mikaela Shiffrin	
1851	6	6 December 2025	(Canada) Tremblant (Flying Mile 42%)	GS _{468}	(New Zealand) Alice Robinson	(Croatia) Zrinka Ljutić	(Canada) Valérie Grenier	(United States) Mikaela Shiffrin	
1852	7	7 December 2025	(Canada) Tremblant (Flying Mile 42%)	GS _{469}	(Austria) Julia Scheib	(Sweden) Sara Hector	(New Zealand) Alice Robinson	(United States) Mikaela Shiffrin	
1853	8	12 December 2025	(Switzerland) St. Moritz (Corviglia 61%)	DH _{457}	(United States) Lindsey Vonn	(Austria) Magdalena Egger	(Austria) Mirjam Puchner	(United States) Mikaela Shiffrin	
1854	9	13 December 2025	(Switzerland) St. Moritz (Corviglia 61%)	DH _{458}	(Germany) Emma Aicher	(United States) Lindsey Vonn	(Italy) Sofia Goggia	(United States) Mikaela Shiffrin	
1855	10	14 December 2025	(Switzerland) St. Moritz (Corviglia 61%)	SG _{280}	(New Zealand) Alice Robinson	(France) Romane Miradoli	(Italy) Sofia Goggia	(United States) Mikaela Shiffrin	
1856	11	16 December 2025	(France) Courchevel (Stade Émile-Allais 58.5%)	SL _{523}	(United States) Mikaela Shiffrin	(Switzerland) Camille Rast	(Germany) Emma Aicher	(United States) Mikaela Shiffrin	
1857	12	20 December 2025	(France) Val d'Isère (Piste Oreiller-Killy 52%)	DH _{459}	(Austria) Cornelia Hütter	(Germany) Kira Weidle-Winkelmann	(United States) Lindsey Vonn	(United States) Mikaela Shiffrin	
1858	13	21 December 2025	(France) Val d'Isère (Piste Oreiller-Killy 52%)	SG _{281}	(Italy) Sofia Goggia	(New Zealand) Alice Robinson	(United States) Lindsey Vonn	(United States) Mikaela Shiffrin	
1859	14	27 December 2025	(Austria) Semmering (Panorama 51%)	GS _{470}	(Austria) Julia Scheib	(Switzerland) Camille Rast	(Sweden) Sara Hector	(United States) Mikaela Shiffrin	
1860	15	28 December 2025	(Austria) Semmering (Panorama 51%)	SL _{524}	(United States) Mikaela Shiffrin	(Switzerland) Camille Rast	(Albania) Lara Colturi	(United States) Mikaela Shiffrin	
1861	16	3 January 2026	(Slovenia) Kranjska Gora (Podkoren 3 59%)	GS _{471}	(Switzerland) Camille Rast	(Austria) Julia Scheib	(United States) Paula Moltzan	(United States) Mikaela Shiffrin	
1862	17	4 January 2026	(Slovenia) Kranjska Gora (Podkoren 3 59%)	SL _{525}	(Switzerland) Camille Rast	(United States) Mikaela Shiffrin	(Switzerland) Wendy Holdener	(United States) Mikaela Shiffrin	
1863	18	10 January 2026	(Austria) Zauchensee (Kälberloch 70%)	DH _{460}	(United States) Lindsey Vonn	(Norway) Kajsa Vickhoff Lie	(United States) Jacqueline Wiles	(United States) Mikaela Shiffrin	
–		11 January 2026	(Austria) Zauchensee (Kälberloch 70%)	SG _{cnx}	cancelled due to strong winds (rescheduled to Soldeu on 28 February)			(United States) Mikaela Shiffrin	
1864	19	13 January 2026	(Austria) Flachau (Griessenkar 53%)	SL _{526}	(United States) Mikaela Shiffrin	(United States) Paula Moltzan	(Austria) Katharina Truppe	(United States) Mikaela Shiffrin	
1865	20	17 January 2026	(Italy) Tarvisio (Di Prampero 47%)	DH _{461}	(Italy) Nicol Delago	(Germany) Kira Weidle-Winkelmann	(United States) Lindsey Vonn	(United States) Mikaela Shiffrin	
1866	21	18 January 2026	(Italy) Tarvisio (Di Prampero 47%)	SG _{282}	(Germany) Emma Aicher	(United States) Lindsey Vonn	(Czech Republic) Ester Ledecká	(United States) Mikaela Shiffrin	
1867	22	20 January 2026	(Italy) Kronplatz (Erta 61%)	GS _{472}	(Austria) Julia Scheib	(Switzerland) Camille Rast	(Sweden) Sara Hector	(United States) Mikaela Shiffrin	
1868	23	24 January 2026	(Czech Republic) Špindlerův Mlýn (Černá Svatý Petr 66%)	GS _{473}	(Sweden) Sara Hector	(United States) Paula Moltzan	(United States) Mikaela Shiffrin	(United States) Mikaela Shiffrin	
1869	24	25 January 2026	(Czech Republic) Špindlerův Mlýn (Černá Svatý Petr 66%)	SL _{527}	(United States) Mikaela Shiffrin	(Switzerland) Camille Rast	(Germany) Emma Aicher	(United States) Mikaela Shiffrin	
–		30 January 2026	(Switzerland) Crans-Montana (Mont Lachaux 53%)	DH _{cnx}	cancelled after 6 racers due to three severe crashes and bad visibility (rescheduled to Val di Fassa on 6 March)			(United States) Mikaela Shiffrin	
1870	25	31 January 2026	(Switzerland) Crans-Montana (Mont Lachaux 53%)	SG _{283}	(Switzerland) Malorie Blanc	(Italy) Sofia Goggia	(United States) Breezy Johnson	(United States) Mikaela Shiffrin	
2026 Winter Olympics (8 – 18 February • Cortina d’Ampezzo, Italy)
1871	26	(Note: The women's Soldeu competition (downhill) schedule has been changed from 28 to 27 February to accommodate the rescheduled super-G.)27 February 2026	(Andorra) Soldeu (Àliga 56%)	DH _{462}	(Switzerland) Corinne Suter	(Austria) Nina Ortlieb	(Italy) Sofia Goggia	(United States) Mikaela Shiffrin	
–		28 February 2026	(Andorra) Soldeu (Àliga 56%)	DH _{cnx}	rescheduled to 27 February to accommodate rescheduled super-G			(United States) Mikaela Shiffrin	—
1872	27	(Note: Cancelled women's super-G in Zauchensee (11 January) is rescheduled to Soldeu on 28 February.)28 February 2026	(Andorra) Soldeu (Àliga 56%)	SG _{284}	(Germany) Emma Aicher	(New Zealand) Alice Robinson	(Switzerland) Corinne Suter	(United States) Mikaela Shiffrin	
1873	28	1 March 2026	(Andorra) Soldeu (Àliga 56%)	SG _{285}	(Italy) Sofia Goggia	(Germany) Emma Aicher	(Norway) Kajsa Vickhoff Lie	(United States) Mikaela Shiffrin	
1874	29	(Note: Cancelled women's downhill in Crans-Montana (31 January) is rescheduled to Val di Fassa on 6 March.)6 March 2026	(Italy) Val di Fassa (La VolatA 47%)	DH _{463}	(Italy) Laura Pirovano	(Germany) Emma Aicher	(United States) Breezy Johnson	(United States) Mikaela Shiffrin	
1875	30	7 March 2026	(Italy) Val di Fassa (La VolatA 47%)	DH _{464}	(Italy) Laura Pirovano	(Austria) Cornelia Hütter	(Switzerland) Corinne Suter	(United States) Mikaela Shiffrin	
1876	31	8 March 2026	(Italy) Val di Fassa (La VolatA 47%)	SG _{286}	(Italy) Elena Curtoni	(Norway) Kajsa Vickhoff Lie	(Italy) Asja Zenere	(United States) Mikaela Shiffrin	
1877	32	14 March 2026	(Sweden) Åre (Störtloppsbacken 55%)	GS _{474}	(Austria) Julia Scheib	(United States) Paula Moltzan	(New Zealand) Alice Robinson	(United States) Mikaela Shiffrin	
1878	33	15 March 2026	(Sweden) Åre (Störtloppsbacken 55%)	SL _{528}	(United States) Mikaela Shiffrin	(Germany) Emma Aicher	(Switzerland) Wendy Holdener	(United States) Mikaela Shiffrin	
World Cup Season Final
1879	34	21 March 2026	(Norway) Kvitfjell (Olympiabakken 64%)	DH _{465}	(Italy) Laura Pirovano	(United States) Breezy Johnson	(Germany) Kira Weidle-Winkelmann	(United States) Mikaela Shiffrin	
1880	35	22 March 2026	(Norway) Kvitfjell (Olympiabakken 64%)	SG _{287}	(Italy) Sofia Goggia	(Switzerland) Corinne Suter	(Germany) Kira Weidle-Winkelmann	(United States) Mikaela Shiffrin	
1881	36	24 March 2026	(Norway) Hafjell (Olympialøypa 52%)	SL _{529}	(United States) Mikaela Shiffrin	(Switzerland) Wendy Holdener	(Germany) Emma Aicher	(United States) Mikaela Shiffrin	
1882	37	25 March 2026	(Norway) Hafjell (Olympialøypa 52%)	GS _{475}	(Canada) Valerie Grenier	(Norway) Mina Fürst Holtmann	(Austria) Julia Scheib	(United States) Mikaela Shiffrin	
60th FIS World Cup Overall (25 October 2025 – 25 March 2026)					(United States) Mikaela Shiffrin	(Germany) Emma Aicher	(Switzerland) Camille Rast	Overall	

=== Rankings ===
==== Overall ====
Rank	after all 37 events	Points
	(United States) Mikaela Shiffrin	1410
2	(Germany) Emma Aicher	1323
3	(Switzerland) Camille Rast	1049
4	(Italy) Sofia Goggia	982
5	(New Zealand) Alice Robinson	815

==== Downhill ====
Rank	after all 9 events	Points
	(Italy) Laura Pirovano	536
2	(Germany) Emma Aicher	453
3	(United States) Breezy Johnson	413
4	(Germany) Kira Weidle-Winkelmann	411
5	(United States) Lindsey Vonn	400

==== Super-G ====
Rank	after all 8 events	Points
	(Italy) Sofia Goggia	549
2	(New Zealand) Alice Robinson	386
3	(Germany) Emma Aicher	354
4	(Norway) Kajsa Vickhoff Lie	289
5	(Czech Republic) Ester Ledecká	284

==== Giant slalom ====
Rank	after all 10 events	Points
	(Austria) Julia Scheib	720
2	(Switzerland) Camille Rast	511
3	(Sweden) Sara Hector	479
4	(United States) Mikaela Shiffrin	422
5	(New Zealand) Alice Robinson	408

==== Slalom ====
Rank	after all 10 events	Points
	(United States) Mikaela Shiffrin	980
2	(Switzerland) Camille Rast	538
3	(Switzerland) Wendy Holdener	498
4	(Austria) Katharina Truppe	441
5	(United States) Paula Moltzan	392

==== Prize money ====
Rank	after all 37 payouts	euro (€)
1	(United States) Mikaela Shiffrin	615,167
2	(Germany) Emma Aicher	387,265
3	(Austria) Julia Scheib	340,942
4	(Switzerland) Camille Rast	320,101
5	(Italy) Sofia Goggia	295,602

== Nations Cup ==
=== Overall ===
Rank	after all 73 events	Points
1	Switzerland	9110
2	Austria	8404
3	Italy	6680
4	United States	5519
5	Norway	4762

=== Men ===
Rank	after all 36 events	Points
1	Switzerland	5633
2	Austria	4321
3	Norway	3457
4	Italy	3113
5	France	2916

=== Women ===
Rank	after all 37 events	Points
1	United States	4548
2	Austria	4083
3	Italy	3567
4	Switzerland	3477
5	Germany	2410

== Podium table by nation ==
Table showing the World Cup podium places (gold–1st place, silver–2nd place, bronze–3rd place) by the countries represented by the athletes.

- final standings after all 73 events

Rank	Nation	Gold	Silver	Bronze	Total
1	Switzerland	17	21	12	50
2	Austria	12	10	10	32
3	Italy	12	4	8	24
4	United States	11	9	9	29
5	Norway	6	8	10	24
6	Germany	3	6	7	16
7	Brazil	3	4	1	8
8	France	3	3	5	11
9	New Zealand	3	2	2	7
10	Sweden	1	1	2	4
11	Canada	1	0	1	2
11	Czech Republic	1	0	1	2
13	Albania	0	2	2	4
14	Finland	0	1	2	3
15	Croatia	0	1	1	2
16	Belgium	0	1	0	1
Totals (16 entries)		73	73	73	219

== Points distribution ==
The table shows the number of points won in the 2025–26 FIS Alpine Ski World Cup for men and women.

Place	1	2	3	4	5	6	7	8	9	10	11	12	13	14	15	16	17	18	19	20	21	22	23	24	25	26	27	28	29	30
World Cup	100	80	60	50	45	40	36	32	29	26	24	22	20	18	16	15	14	13	12	11	10	9	8	7	6	5	4	3	2	1
World Cup Finals	100	80	60	50	45	40	36	32	29	26	24	22	20	18	16	—N/a

== Prize money distribution ==
Higher prize money will be distributed this season in Euro (€) (no more in Swiss franc). Flachau and Kitzbühel have higher prize money.

=== Men and women ===
Flachau (1 women's event) and Kitzbühel (3 men's events) are excluded.

1st	2nd	3rd	4th	5th	6th	7th	8th	9th	10th	11th	12th	13th	14th	15th	Total: €167,619
€54,709	€25,608	€13,968	€10,476	€8,148	€6,984	€5,820	€4,656	€4,074	€3,492	€2,910	€2,328	€2,095	€1,979	€1,862	Total: €167,619
16th	17th	18th	19th	20th	21st	22nd	23rd	24th	25th	26th	27th	28th	29th	30th	Total: €167,619
€1,746	€1,630	€1,513	€1,455	€1,397	€1,339	€1,280	€1,222	€1,164	€1,106	€1,048	€989	€931	€874	€816	Total: €167,619

=== Flachau ===
1st	2nd	3rd	4th	5th	6th	7th	8th	9th	10th	11th	12th	13th	14th	15th	Total: €193,334
€70,000	€35,000	€15,000	€10,476	€8,148	€6,984	€5,820	€4,656	€4,074	€3,492	€2,910	€2,328	€2,095	€1,979	€1,862	Total: €193,334
16th	17th	18th	19th	20th	21st	22nd	23rd	24th	25th	26th	27th	28th	29th	30th	Total: €193,334
€1,746	€1,630	€1,513	€1,455	€1,397	€1,339	€1,280	€1,222	€1,164	€1,106	€1,048	€989	€931	€874	€816	Total: €193,334

=== Kitzbühel ===
1st	2nd	3rd	4th	5th	6th	7th	8th	9th	10th	11th	12th	13th	14th	15th	Total: €350,000
€101,000	€51,000	€26,000	€18,500	€15,500	€13,500	€12,500	€11,500	€10,500	€9,500	€8,500	€7,500	€6,500	€5,500	€4,500	Total: €350,000
16th	17th	18th	19th	20th	21st	22nd	23rd	24th	25th	26th	27th	28th	29th	30th	Total: €350,000
€3,900	€3,800	€3,700	€3,600	€3,500	€3,400	€3,300	€3,200	€3,100	€3,000	€2,900	€2,800	€2,700	€2,600	€2,500	Total: €350,000

== Achievements ==
First World Cup career victory

Men

- (France) Paco Rassat (27), in his 5th season – SL in Gurgl
- (Austria) Stefan Brennsteiner (34), in his 14th season – GS in Copper Mountain
- (Czech Republic) Jan Zabystřan (27), in his 8th season – SG in Val Gardena
- (Italy) Giovanni Franzoni (24), in his 6th season – SG in Wengen

Women

- (Austria) Julia Scheib (27), in her 8th season – GS in Sölden
- (Italy) Nicol Delago (30), in her 12th season – DH in Tarvisio
- (Switzerland) Malorie Blanc (22), in her 2nd season – SG in Crans-Montana
- (Italy) Laura Pirovano (28), in her 10th season – DH in Val di Fassa

First World Cup podium

Men

- (France) Paco Rassat (27), in his 5th season – SL in Gurgl – 1st place
- (Czech Republic) Jan Zabystřan (27), in his 8th season – SG in Val Gardena – 1st place
- (Belgium) Armand Marchant (27), in his 10th season – SL in Gurgl – 2nd place
- (Austria) Stefan Babinsky (29), in his 7th season – SG in Wengen – 2nd place
- (Finland) Eduard Hallberg (22), in his 3rd season – SL in Levi – 3rd place
- (Italy) Giovanni Franzoni (24), in his 6th season – SG in Val Gardena – 3rd place
- (France) Alban Elezi Cannaferina (22), in his 3rd season – GS in Schladming – 3rd place

Women

- (Italy) Laura Pirovano (28), in her 10th season – DH in Val di Fassa – 1st place
- (Austria) Magdalena Egger (24), in her 6th season – DH in St. Moritz – 2nd place
- (Italy) Asja Zenere (29), in her 5th season – SG in Val di Fassa – 3rd place

Number of wins this season (in brackets are all-time wins)

Men

- (Switzerland) Marco Odermatt – 9 (54)
- (Brazil) Lucas Pinheiro Braathen – 3 (8)
- (Norway) Atle Lie McGrath – 3 (6)
- (Italy) Dominik Paris – 2 (26)
- (Austria) Vincent Kriechmayr – 2 (20)
- (Switzerland) Loïc Meillard – 2 (9)
- (Austria) Marco Schwarz – 2 (8)
- (Norway) Timon Haugan – 2 (6)
- (Switzerland) Franjo von Allmen – 2 (5)
- (France) Paco Rassat – 2 (2)
- (Italy) Giovanni Franzoni – 2 (2)
- (Norway) Henrik Kristoffersen – 1 (34)
- (France) Clément Noël – 1 (15)
- (Austria) Manuel Feller – 1 (7)
- (Austria) Stefan Brennsteiner – 1 (1)
- (Czech Republic) Jan Zabystřan – 1 (1)

Women

- (United States) Mikaela Shiffrin – 9 (110) (Note: All-time record in World Cup history)
- (Austria) Julia Scheib – 5 (5)
- (New Zealand) Alice Robinson – 3 (7)
- (Germany) Emma Aicher – 3 (5)
- (Italy) Sofia Goggia – 3 (29)
- (Italy) Laura Pirovano – 3 (3)
- (United States) Lindsey Vonn – 2 (84)
- (Switzerland) Camille Rast – 2 (4)
- (Austria) Cornelia Hütter – 1 (10)
- (Sweden) Sara Hector – 1 (8)
- (Switzerland) Corinne Suter – 1 (6)
- (Italy) Elena Curtoni – 1 (4)
- (Canada) Valerie Grenier – 1 (3)
- (Italy) Nicol Delago – 1 (1)
- (Switzerland) Malorie Blanc – 1 (1)

== Retirements ==
The following notable skiers, who competed in the World Cup, retired during or after the 2025–26 season:

Men

- (Germany) Romed Baumann
- (Austria) Daniel Danklmaier
- (Greece) AJ Ginnis
- (Switzerland) Niels Hintermann
- (Germany) Sebastian Holzmann
- (Italy) Simon Maurberger
- (France) Alexis Pinturault
- (Switzerland) Marc Rochat
- (United Kingdom) Dave Ryding
- (Germany) Andreas Sander
- (Canada) Riley Seger
- (France) Adrien Théaux

Women

- (Austria) Christina Ager
- (Japan) Asa Ando
- (Sweden) Moa Boström Müssener
- (Slovenia) Ana Bucik Jogan
- (France) Clara Direz
- (Switzerland) Andrea Ellenberger
- (Switzerland) Joana Hählen
- (Austria) Vanessa Nussbaumer
- (Austria) Mirjam Puchner
- (Slovenia) Ilka Štuhec
- (Austria) Lena Wechner
