= Levi Black =

World Cup slalom ski course in Finland

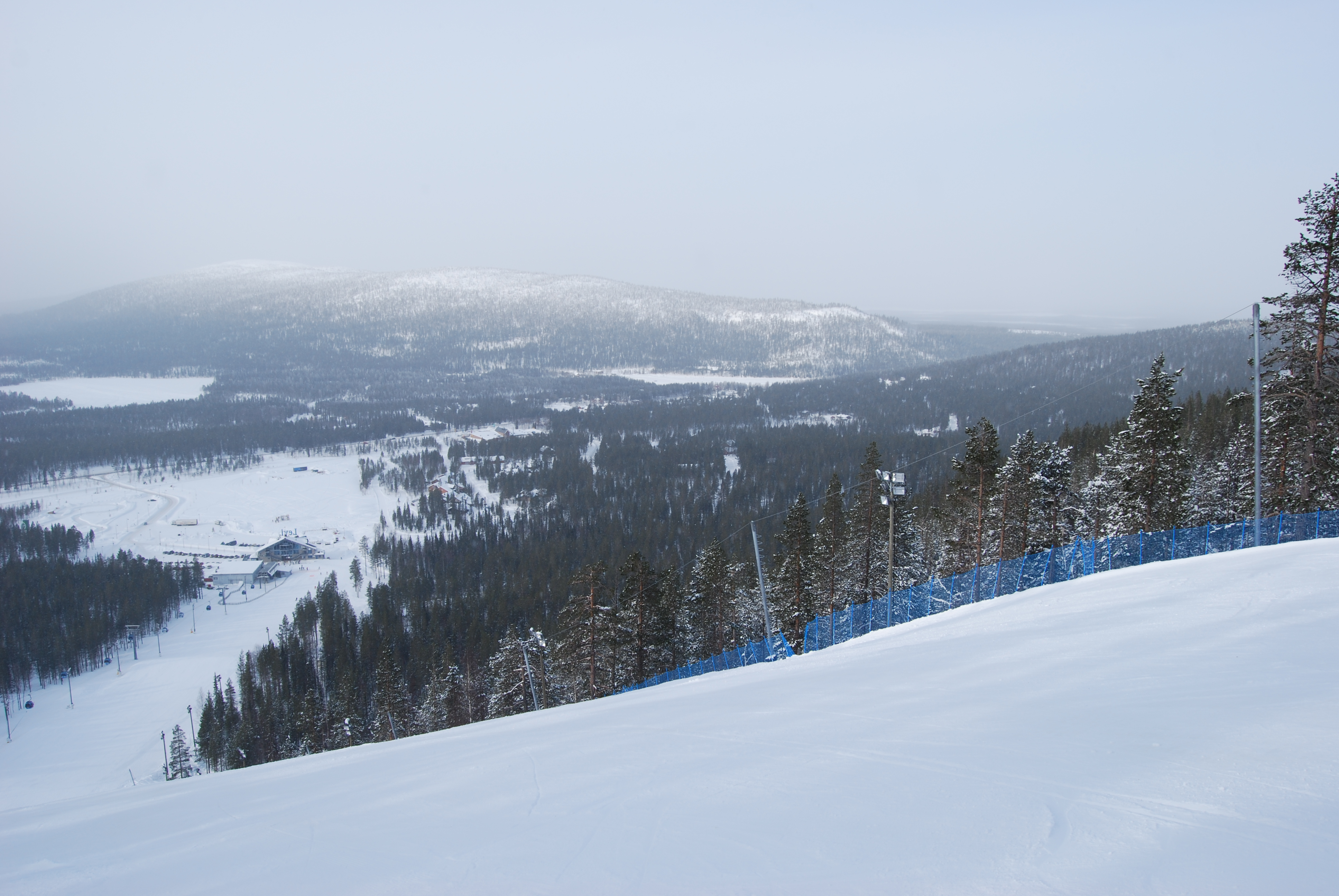
- Interactive map of Levi Black
- Location in Finland
- 67°47′12″N 24°49′29″E
- Location: Levi, Lapland, Finland
- Opened: 2004 (women); 2007 (men)

Slalom
- Start: 438 m (1,437 ft) (AA)
- Finish: 258 m (846 ft)
- Vertical drop: 180 m (591 ft)
- Max incline: 27.5 degrees (52%)
- Avg incline: 17.1 degrees (30.8%)
- Most Wins (M): (Austria) Marcel Hirscher (3x)
- Most Wins (W): (United States) Mikaela Shiffrin (9x)

Levi Black is a World Cup slalom ski course in northern Finland at Levi, Lapland, approximately 170 kilometres (110 miles) north of the Arctic Circle. The race course debuted in February 2004, and the World Cup slalom events moved to November in 2006.

== World Cup ==
Levi Black's finish elevation is 258 metres (846 ft) above sea level, the lowest on the women's World Cup circuit and second overall, next to the men's Olympiabakken in Kvitfjell, Norway.

The World Cup slalom course has maximum incline of 52% and averages 31%.

Mikaela Shiffrin (USA)	Marcel Hirscher (AUT)	Lower Preston's Pitch
300x	300x	300x
Won record 9 slaloms	Won record 3 slaloms	The steepest part

=== Women's slalom ===
No.	Date	Winner	Second	Third
1107	28 February 2004	(Finland) Tanja Poutiainen	(Austria) Elisabeth Görgl	(Germany) Maria Riesch
1108	29 February 2004	(Germany) Maria Riesch	(Austria) Elisabeth Görgl	(Germany) Martina Ertl
1176	10 March 2006	(Sweden) Anja Pärson	(Croatia) Janica Kostelić	(Austria) Nicole Hosp
1777	11 March 2006	(Croatia) Janica Kostelić	(Sweden) Anja Pärson	(Austria) Kathrin Zettel
1183	12 November 2006	(Austria) Marlies Schild	(Austria) Kathrin Zettel	(Austria) Nicole Hosp
	10 November 2007	cancelled; replaced in Reiteralm on the same day		
1253	15 November 2008	(United States) Lindsey Vonn	(Sweden) Maria Pietilä Holmner	(Germany) Maria Riesch
1287	14 November 2009	(Germany) Maria Riesch	(United States) Lindsey Vonn	(Finland) Tanja Poutiainen
1319	13 November 2010	(Austria) Marlies Schild (2)	(Germany) Maria Riesch	(Finland) Tanja Poutiainen
	12 November 2011	lack of snow; replaced in Flachau on 20 December 2011		
1389	10 November 2012	(Germany) Maria Riesch (3)	(Finland) Tanja Poutiainen	(United States) Mikaela Shiffrin
1424	16 November 2013	(United States) Mikaela Shiffrin	(Germany) Maria Riesch	(Slovenia) Tina Maze
1456	15 November 2014	(Slovenia) Tina Maze	(Sweden) Frida Hansdotter	(Austria) Kathrin Zettel
	14 November 2015	lack of snow; replaced in Aspen on 28 November 2015		
1528	12 November 2016	(United States) Mikaela Shiffrin	(Switzerland) Wendy Holdener	(Slovakia) Petra Vlhová
1565	11 November 2017	(Slovakia) Petra Vlhová	(United States) Mikaela Shiffrin	(Switzerland) Wendy Holdener
1603	17 November 2018	(United States) Mikaela Shiffrin	(Slovakia) Petra Vlhová	(Austria) Bernadette Schild
1638	23 November 2019	(United States) Mikaela Shiffrin	(Switzerland) Wendy Holdener	(Austria) Katharina Truppe
1668	21 November 2020	(Slovakia) Petra Vlhová	(United States) Mikaela Shiffrin	(Austria) Katharina Liensberger
1669	22 November 2020	(Slovakia) Petra Vlhová	(Switzerland) Michelle Gisin	(Austria) Katharina Liensberger
1700	20 November 2021	(Slovakia) Petra Vlhová	(United States) Mikaela Shiffrin	(Germany) Lena Dürr
1701	21 November 2021	(Slovakia) Petra Vlhová	(United States) Mikaela Shiffrin	(Germany) Lena Dürr
1735	19 November 2022	(United States) Mikaela Shiffrin	(Sweden) Anna Swenn-Larsson	(Slovakia) Petra Vlhová
1736	20 November 2022	(United States) Mikaela Shiffrin	(Switzerland) Wendy Holdener	(Slovakia) Petra Vlhová
1774	11 November 2023	(Slovakia) Petra Vlhová (6)	(Germany) Lena Dürr	(Austria) Katharina Liensberger
1775	12 November 2023	(United States) Mikaela Shiffrin	(Croatia) Leona Popović	(Germany) Lena Dürr
1813	16 November 2024	(United States) Mikaela Shiffrin	(Austria) Katharina Liensberger	(Germany) Lena Dürr
1966	15 November 2025	(United States) Mikaela Shiffrin (9)	(Albania) Lara Colturi	(Germany) Emma Aicher

Not in original calendar. Replaced Killington

=== Men's slalom ===
No.	Date	Winner	Second	Third
1262	12 November 2006	(Austria) Benjamin Raich	(Sweden) Markus Larsson	(Italy) Giorgio Rocca
	11 November 2007	cancelled; replaced in Reiteralm on the same day		
1339	16 November 2008	(France) J.-Baptiste Grange	(United States) Bode Miller	(Austria) Mario Matt
1375	15 November 2009	(Austria) Reinfried Herbst	(Croatia) Ivica Kostelić	(France) J.-Baptiste Grang
1408	14 November 2010	(France) J.-Baptiste Grange (2)	(Sweden) André Myhrer	(Croatia) Ivica Kostelić
	13 November 2011	lack of snow; replaced in Flachau on 20 December 2011		
1489	11 November 2012	(Sweden) André Myhrer	(Austria) Marcel Hirscher	(Sweden) Jens Byggmark
1523	17 November 2013	(Austria) Marcel Hirscher	(Austria) Mario Matt	(Norway) Henrik Kristoffersen
1557	16 November 2014	(Norway) Henrik Kristoffersen	(Austria) Marcel Hirscher	(Germany) Felix Neureuther
	15 November 2015	lack of snow; replaced in Aspen on 28 November 2015		
1638	13 November 2016	(Austria) Marcel Hirscher	(Austria) Michael Matt	(Italy) Manfred Mölgg
1673	12 November 2017	(Germany) Felix Neureuther	(Norway) Henrik Kristoffersen	(Sweden) Mattias Hargin
1709	18 November 2018	(Austria) Marcel Hirscher (3)	(Norway) Henrik Kristoffersen	(Sweden) André Myhrer
1748	24 November 2019	(Norway) Henrik Kristoffersen (2)	(France) Clément Noël	(Switzerland) Daniel Yule
	22 November 2020	cancelled; replaced on 30 January 2021		
1929	17 November 2024	(France) Clément Noël	(Norway) Henrik Kristoffersen	(Switzerland) Loïc Meillard
1847	16 November 2025	(Brazil) L. Pinheiro Braathen	(France) Clément Noël	(Finland) Eduard Hallberg
