= Juhan Luik =

Estonian alpine skier (born 1997)

Personal information
- Born: 25 November 1997 (age 28) Estonia

Skiing career
- Sport: Alpine skiing
- Club: Sportclub Skisport
- Disciplines: Slalom, giant slalom, downhill, super-G, alpine combined
World Cup debut
26 February 2017 (age 19)

World Championships
- Teams: 1
- Medals: 0

World Cup
- Seasons: 1st – (2017–)

Juhan Luik (born 25 November 1997) is an Estonian alpine ski racer. Luik made his World Cup debut on 26 February 2017. He competed for Estonia at the 2017 FIS Alpine World Ski Championships in the slalom, giant slalom and super-G.

== Career ==
Luik competed for Estonia at the 2014 World Junior Alpine Skiing Championships in Jasná, Slovakia. He failed to finish the second run of the combined, he finished 83rd in the super-G, 69th in the downhill and 73rd in the giant slalom. He competed at the 2016 World Junior Alpine Skiing Championships in Sochi, Russia. He finished 57th in the downhill and 59th in the super-G, but failed to finish the combined, giant slalom, and slalom. He competed at the 2017 FIS Alpine World Ski Championships in St. Moritz, Switzerland. He failed to finish the first run of the slalom and the giant slalom; he also failed to finish the super-G. He made his World Cup debut in the Kvitfjell downhill on 26 February 2017; he finished in 52nd place.

== World Championship results ==
Year	Age	Slalom	Giant slalom	Super-G	Downhill	Combined
2017	19	DNF1	DNF1	DNF	—	—
2021	21			32		

== Junior World Championship results ==
Year	Age	Slalom	Giant slalom	Super-G	Downhill	Combined
2014	16	—	73	83	69	DNF2
2016	18	DNF1	DNF1	59	57	DNF1

== World Cup results ==
Downhill
Year	1	2	3	4	5	6	7	8	Fin.	Pos	Points
2017-18	LAK -	BEA -	VGA -	BOR -	WEN -	KIT -	GAR -	KVI; 58	ÅRE -	–	0

Super-G
Year	1	2	3	4	5	Fin.	Pos	Points
2016-17	ISE -	VGA -	SAN -	KIT -	KVI; 52	ASP -	-	0
2017-18	LAK -	BEA -	VGA -	KIT -	KVI; 51	ÅRE -	–	0
