= Billy Major =

British alpine skier (born 1996)

Personal information
- Born: 21 November 1996 (age 29) Saffron Walden, England
- Website: billymajor.com

Skiing career
- Country: United Kingdom
- Sport: Alpine skiing
- Disciplines: Slalom
- World Cup debut: 21 December 2020 (age 24)

Olympics
- Teams: 2 – (2022, 2026)
- Medals: 0

World Championships
- Teams: 4 – (2019–2025)
- Medals: 0

World Cup
- Seasons: 7 – (2020–2026)
- Podiums: 0
- Overall titles: 0 – (88th in 2025)
- Discipline titles: 0 – (31st in SL, 2024)

Billy Major (born 21 November 1996) is a British alpine ski racer who competes in the slalom. He finished inside the Top 20 at the 2025 World Championships and the 2026 Winter Olympics.

== Early life ==
Major grew up in Saffron Walden. His parents ran a skiing company, and he began skiing at the age of two and competing in races when he was seven. He attended the Dame Bradbury School.

== Career ==
After winning the Delancey British Alpine Championships in 2017 and 2018, Major was selected to compete at the 2019 World Ski Championships.

Major competed at the 2022 Winter Olympics in the slalom, however failed to finish the first run. He had set the fastest time at the first checkpoint on the course. In 2023, he finished 16th in a World Cup race in Gurgl, marking his best result up to that point.

Major competed at the 2025 World Championships, finishing in 15th place. Later in the season he achieved a personal best of ninth place in a World Cup race at Hafjell. His good form continued into the 2025-26 season, where he placed inside the Top 30 in four World Cup races prior to the Olympics. At the 2026 Winter Olympics, he competed in the slalom. He finished the first run in thirteenth position, however dropped to 16th after the second run, finishing ahead of team-mate Dave Ryding.

== Personal life ==
Alongside skiing, Major studied neuroscience at the University of Manchester.

== World Cup results ==
=== Season standings ===
Season
Season	Age	Overall	Slalom	Giant slalom	Super-G	Downhill
2022	25	130	48	—	—	—
2023	26	117	38	—	—	—
2024	27	90	31	—	—	—
2025	28	88	37	—	—	—
2026	29	94	35	—	—	—

== World Championship results ==
Year
Year	Age	Slalom	Giant slalom	Super-G	Downhill	Combined	Team combined	Parallel	Team event
2019	22	DNF2	—	—	—	—	—N/a	—N/a	—
2021	24	DNF1	—	—	—	—	—N/a	DNQ	—
2023	26	28	—	—	—	—	—N/a	—	—
2025	28	15	—	—	—	—N/a	—	—N/a	—

== Olympic results ==
Year
Year	Age	Slalom	Giant slalom	Super-G	Downhill	Combined	Team combined	Team event
2022	25	DNF1	—	—	—	—	—N/a	—
2026	29	16	—	—	—	—N/a	—	—N/a
