= Dave Ryding =

English alpine skier (born 1986)

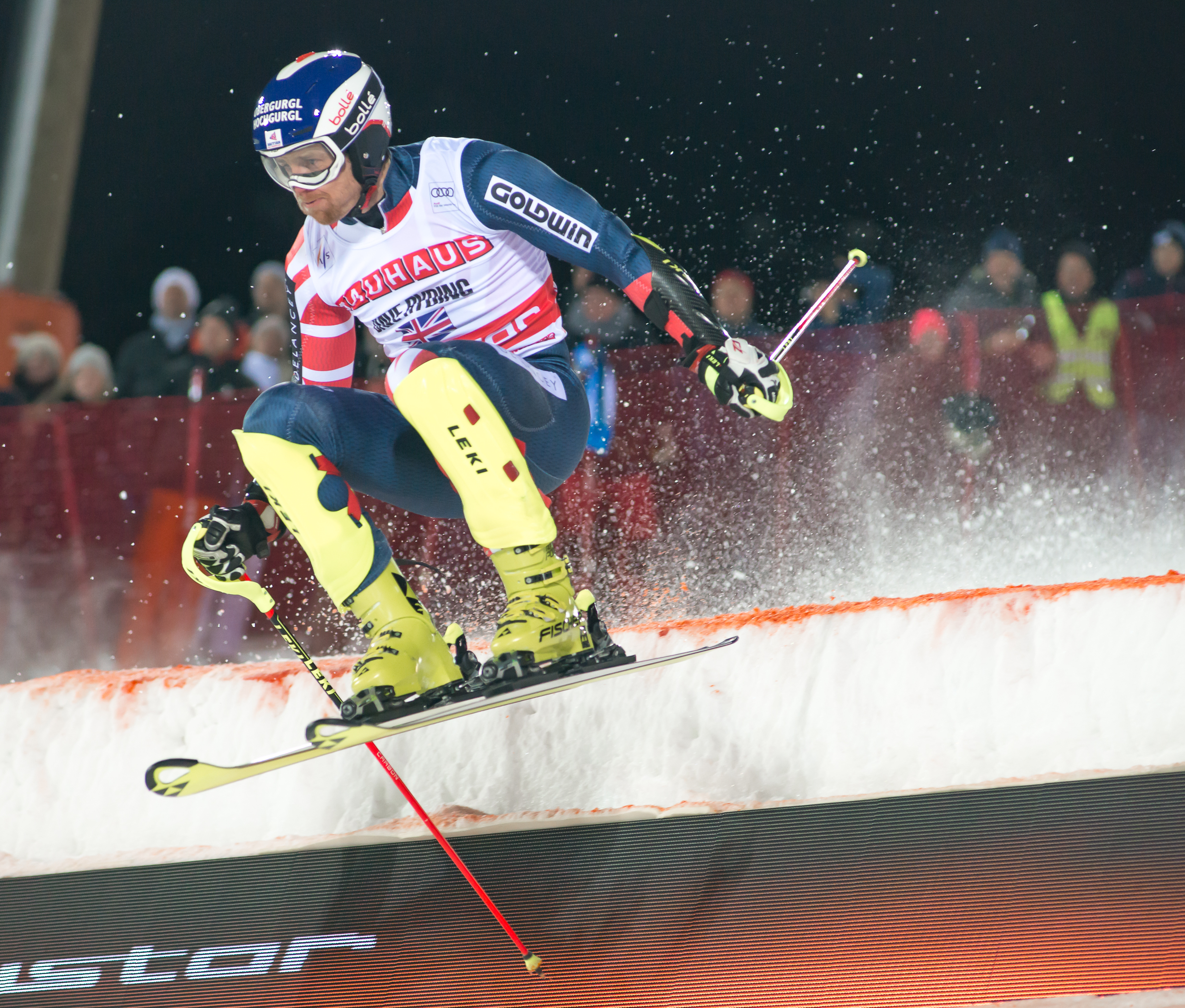
- At Stockholm in January 2018

Personal information
- Born: 5 December 1986 (age 39) Chorley and South Ribble Hospital, Chorley, Lancashire, England
- Height: 5 ft 11 in (180 cm)

Skiing career
- Country: United Kingdom
- Sport: Alpine skiing
- Club: Kandahar Ski Club
- Retired: 16 February 2026 (age 39)
- Disciplines: Slalom
- World Cup debut: 21 December 2009 (age 23)

Olympics
- Teams: 5 – (2010–2026)
- Medals: 0

World Championships
- Teams: 9 – (2009–2025)
- Medals: 0

World Cup
- Seasons: 16 – (2010, 2012–2026)
- Wins: 1 – (1 SL)
- Podiums: 7 – (6 SL, 1 PS)
- Overall titles: 0 – (23rd in 2017)
- Discipline titles: 0 – (7th in SL, 2024)

David Ryding (born 5 December 1986) is a retired English World Cup alpine ski racer who specialised in slalom. Widely considered to be the greatest British skier of all time, he competed for Great Britain in five Olympics, nine World Championships, and won the Europa Cup Slalom Series in 2013. Ryding's best World Cup result was a victory in the 2022 Kitzbühel slalom, the first victory for any British athlete at that level in Alpine skiing.

== Early life ==
Ryding grew up in Croston and Bretherton, Chorley, Lancashire and attended Trinity St Michaels Junior and Infant School, Croston, Bishop Rawstorne Church of England Academy, Croston and Runshaw College, Leyland

During his junior school year in 1998 age 11, Dave was the individual boys champion of the Chorley & District large schools cross-country race held at Albany High, Chorley.

While at Bishop Rawstorne CE Language College in 1999. Dave as part of a team of four including his sister Joanna Ryding, Peter Williams and Rachel Turner were crowned the Under 14s English Skiing School Champions. All four negotiated a tough slalom course on the dry slope in Swadlincote, Derbyshire. The pupils training at Ski Rossendale with the school and at the ski slope in Pendle during their free time.

== Career ==
=== Early career ===
Born at Chorley & South Ribble Hospital, Chorley, and growing up in Croston and Bretherton, Lancashire, England. Ryding started competing on dry ski slopes at age eight, first skied on snow at twelve, and continued racing on dry slopes until age 21. He began skiing at Pendle Ski Club.

Ryding started competing on the Europa Cup, considered the second tier of global ski racing, from the 2007–08 season, and made his World Cup debut in a slalom race in Alta Badia in December 2009.

He won his first British national senior title in 2008, defeating Alain Baxter, who was competing in his final British championships and whom Ryding described as his role model during his teenage years. He has since gone on to win eight British Championship slalom titles.

Ryding competed for Great Britain at the 2010 Winter Olympics in giant slalom, in which he finished 47th, and in slalom, in which he finished 27th.

After the 2010 Olympics, he started working with coach Tristan Glasse-Davies, who remained as Ryding's coach until 2024, when Glasse-Davies moved to coach the US Ski Team's slalom squad. Glasse-Davies suggested after the 2010 Olympics that Ryding should work on his technique by training in indoor snow parks.

=== 2013 season ===
Ryding scored his first ever World Cup points in the opening slalom race of the 2013 season, finishing 26th place in Levi, Finland in November 2012. This was his only points-scoring race of the season. He also raced in the Europa Cup throughout the season, and won the season-long slalom title after finishing ninth in the final race of the season in Kranjska Gora. This made Ryding the first British skier in history to win a title in the Europa Cup.

=== 2014 season ===
Ryding continued to race frequently in the World Cup and Europa Cup throughout the 2014 season, but failed to score any points in the former.

He competed at the 2014 Winter Olympics in Sochi, Russia, finishing 17th in the slalom at Rosa Khutor. This was the highest finish for a British alpine skier at the 2014 Olympics, but Ryding was "frustrated" after the race, as he felt an error on the second run cost him a higher finish. Following the Games, Glasse-Davies diagnosed that Ryding's technique on left-footed turns needed to be improved: through technical training and repetitive exercise they broke down and rebuilt his left-footed technique.

=== 2015 season ===
The 2015 World Cup season would prove to be Ryding's breakthrough year on the World Cup circuit. He scored his second World Cup points finish in a slalom race in Åre in December 2014, finishing 17th – the best World Cup result for a British alpine skier since Chemmy Alcott finished 17th in Garmisch in March 2010.

Ryding followed this up with a 16th place in the Madonna di Campiglio slalom later that month, and three further top 30 finishes in the classic slalom races in Adelboden, Wengen and Schladming slaloms in January 2015. Ryding finished the 2015 season in 30th place in the slalom standings.

=== 2016 season ===
Ryding started his campaign in the 2016 season with a 12th place finish at the opening slalom race of the season in Val-d'Isère in December 2015, his highest ever finish in the World Cup at the time. Ryding went on to qualify for the second run in every World Cup slalom race of the season and scored points in nine of the ten slalom races in 2016.

Consequently, Ryding became the fourth Briton in World Cup history to qualify for the World Cup Finals, after Alain Baxter, Finlay Mickel and Alcott. He finished 15th in the final race of the season in St. Moritz, and ended the season in 22nd in the World Cup slalom standings.

=== 2017 season ===
Ryding opened his 2017 season with a sixth place finish in the first slalom race of the World Cup season in Levi in November 2016, after finishing fourth on the first run. This was his first ever top ten finish in a World Cup race, and the best result for a British alpine ski racer since Alain Baxter's fourth place in Åre in 2001. Ryding backed this up with two further top 20 finishes in Val-d'Isère and Madonna di Campiglio in December and a seventh place finish in Zagreb in January 2017, his second top ten in the World Cup. He also finished in the top 15 in Adelboden and Wengen in January.

On 22 January, Ryding took his first ever World Cup podium in the Hahnenkamm slalom in Kitzbühel, after leading the first run, finishing behind Austrian Marcel Hirscher and ahead of his training partner Aleksandr Khoroshilov, who finished third. He became only the second British man to finish on the podium in a World Cup ski race, after Konrad Bartelski (who finished second in the Val Gardena downhill in 1981), and only the fourth Briton to take a World Cup podium in history (after Bartelski, Gina Hathorn and Divina Galica, who were on the podium on the women's circuit in 1967 and 1968 respectively). In an interview later that year, Ryding said that as he had never completed two runs at Kitzbühel, he had engaged in extensive video analysis of Fritz Dopfer's fastest first run in the previous year's Hahnenkamm slalom ahead of the race, watching it "70 times at least" to observe how Dopfer adapted to the piste's terrain changes.

In February, Ryding finished 11th in the slalom at the 2017 World Championships in St. Moritz, the best result for a British skier at a World Championships since Finlay Mickel in 2005. Ryding had finished fourth after the first run, raising hopes of becoming the first British man to stand on a World Championship podium, but slipped down the standings on his second run.

Ryding finished in the points in three of the remaining four World Cup races for the 2017 season, with a DNF in Kranjska Gora his only non-points scoring race. This included a fourth-place finish in the parallel slalom city event in Stockholm just before the World Championships, his first ever World Cup parallel event, missing the podium by just 0.06 of a second behind Sweden's Mattias Hargin in the small final. Consequently, he finished the season in eighth place in the World Cup slalom standings, his highest ever finish at the time.

=== 2018 season ===
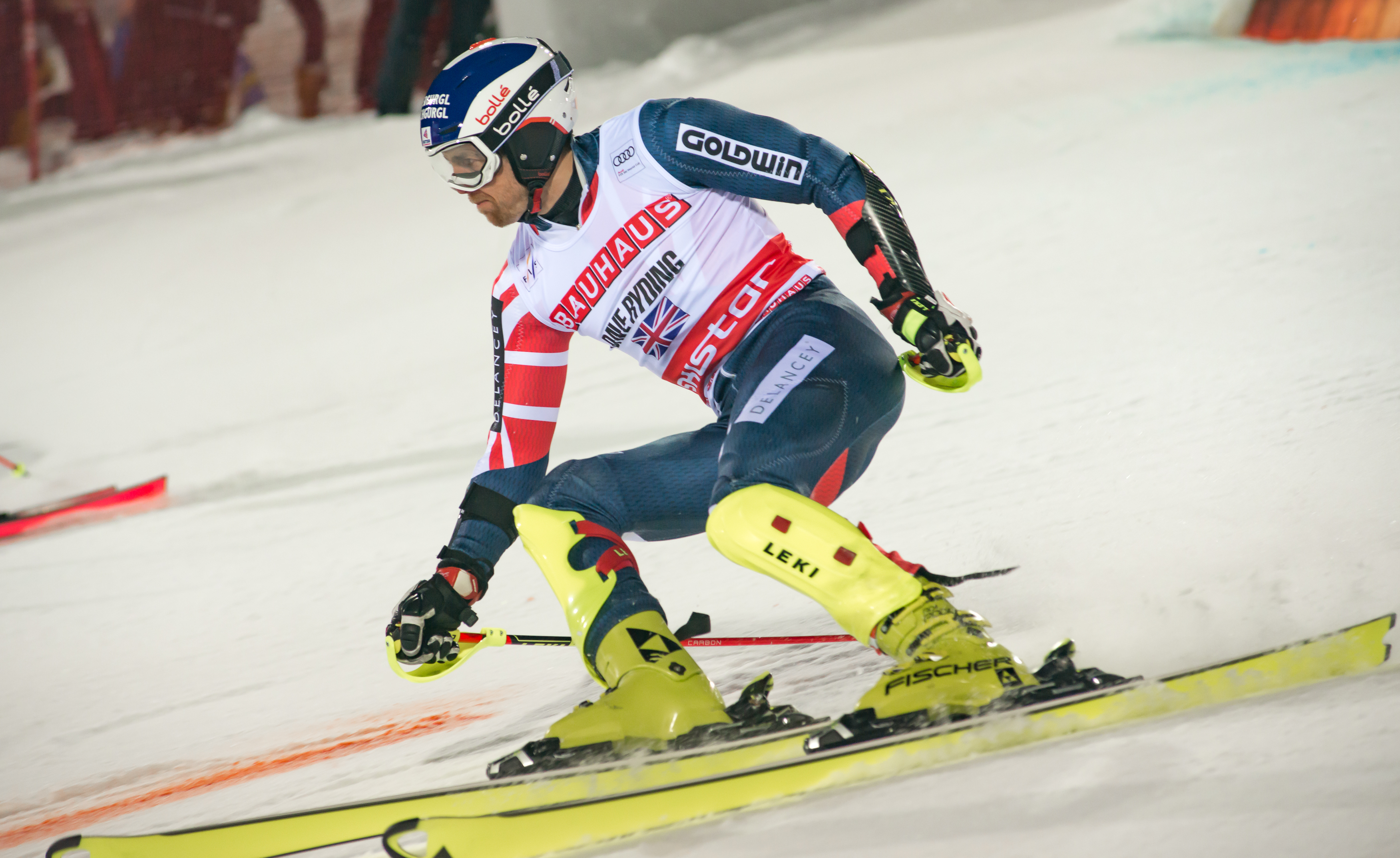
Ryding at Hammarbybacken (Stockholm) in January 2018

Ryding began his 2018 season at the opening slalom race of the World Cup in Levi in November 2017, and led the race after the first run. In the second run, he extended his lead from 0.14 to 0.51 seconds, before hitting a rut and missing a gate within sight of the finish, missing out on his first ever World Cup win.

Ryding took his first points in the season in Val-d'Isère in December, but was disappointed with his 19th place finish in a race that was affected by heavy snowfall. He took his first top 10 finish of the season in the pre-Christmas slalom in Madonna di Campiglio, finishing sixth.

Ryding competed in a parallel slalom in Oslo on New Year's Day 2018, where he repeated his fourth place finish from Stockholm the previous season, which would prove to be his highest finish of the season. Ryding's run to the semi-finals included knocking out overall World Cup champion Marcel Hirscher in the quarter-finals. However, he crashed out in his semi-final against Michael Matt and was beaten by Linus Strasser in the small final.

In the run of classic slalom races in January 2018, Ryding finished 12th in Adelboden, but crashed out on the first run in Wengen. In the race in Kitzbühel where he had finished on the podium 12 months prior, Ryding struggled in the first run, placing 25th, but set the fastest time on the second run to climb up to ninth place. He ended the month with a 12th place in Schladming before the Olympics.

Ryding competed at the 2018 Winter Olympics in Pyongchang, South Korea in the slalom, and was heavily touted as a potential British medal contender, including by former ski racer and pundit Graham Bell, with hopes of becoming Britain's first Olympic alpine skiing medallist. Ryding finished the first run of the slalom in 13th place, before moving up to finish ninth after the second run, exactly half a second outside of the medals. This was the best Olympic result for a British alpine skier since Martin Bell's eighth place in the men's downhill in 1988.

He went on the finish the season 11th in the World Cup slalom standings, closing his season with a top 20 finish in Kranjska Gora in March after the World Cup finals were cancelled due to high winds.

=== 2019 season ===
Ryding opened his season with a 12th place finish in the first slalom World Cup race of the season in Levi in November 2018, followed by 23rd in Saalbach in December. He took one of the best World Cup results of his career so far in the slalom in Madonna di Campiglio later that month; after placing 27th in the first run, he set the fastest second run to finish fourth.

Ryding's good form continued at the parallel slalom in Oslo on New Year's Day 2019, where he yet again knocked out Hirscher in the quarter-finals for the second year running, before defeating reigning Olympic slalom champion André Myhrer in the semi-finals. He lost out in the final to Marco Schwarz after missing a gate, but his second place equalled his career best World Cup result from 2017. He followed this up with two further slalom top ten finishes in Wengen and Schladming later that month.

At the 2019 Alpine World Ski Championships in Åre, Ryding took his best ever World Championship result, finishing ninth in the slalom and setting the third-fastest time on the second run. He placed ninth in the slalom World Cup standings for the 2019 season, having scored points in all but one of the season's 11 slalom races.

=== 2020 season ===
The opening race of Ryding's 2020 season in Levi in November 2019 echoed that of two years earlier; he once again performed strongly in the first run at the opening slalom in Levi, placing second, and started the second run quickly before crashing out near the finish. Ryding failed to repeat that form throughout the rest of the season; despite scoring points in all of the remaining races and finishing in the top 20 in all but one race, his best finish came in January 2020, when he tied for seventh. He followed this up later in the month with an eighth place finish in Schladming, before the season was cut short due to the COVID-19 pandemic. Ryding finished 13th in the season slalom standings, his lowest finish since 2016.

=== 2021 season ===
The 2021 World Cup season calendar was heavily revised due to the ongoing pandemic, and Ryding's season did not begin until late December 2020 in Alta Badia, where he finished in tenth in the opening slalom race of the season. He finished outside of the top 20 in the next two races in Madonna di Campiglio and Zagreb.

In January, Ryding took his third career World Cup podium in Adelboden and his first in classic slalom since 2017, finishing third after moving up from eighth after the first run, and was just 0.15 seconds behind winner Marco Schwarz. Ryding backed this up with a third top ten finish of the season in Flachau later that month, finishing in seventh, and finished in the top 15 in the second race in Flachau, as well as in Schladming and Chamonix.

At the 2021 World Championships in Cortina d'Ampezzo, Ryding crashed out of the first run of the slalom, when he was just 0.12 seconds behind leader Adrian Pertl at the third intermediate time check, which would have placed Ryding in second. Ryding's season ended inconspicuously with low points finishes in Kranjska Gora and Lenzerheide, and he finished 12th in the World Cup slalom standings.

=== 2022 season ===
The 2022 World Cup season would prove to be Ryding's most successful to date, including the first win of his career. He finished fifth in the opening slalom race of the season in Val-d'Isère in December 2021, his best ever result at the French resort. He was on track to follow this up with another top five result in Madonna di Campiglio later that month, finishing fourth after the first run, but crashed out on the second run. He crashed out again on the second run the next month in Adelboden.

On 22 January 2022, Ryding took his first ever World Cup win in the slalom race in Kitzbühel. Ryding was sixth after the first run, but jumped five positions in heavy snowfall in the second run This made him the first Briton ever to win a World Cup race and, at the age of 35, he became the oldest-ever winner of a World Cup slalom. He was also the first Briton to win at Kitzbühel's Hahnenkamm Races since Gordon Cleaver's victory in the combined event at the first edition in 1931, before the establishment of the World Cup.

Following his success, Ryding was selected as the flag-bearer for Great Britain at the opening ceremony of the 2022 Winter Olympics, alongside curler Eve Muirhead, and was heavily touted as a medal prospect following his win in Kitzbühel. However, he struggled on both of his runs in the slalom race, finishing 13th after placing 16th on the first run.

Ryding returned to the World Cup circuit after the Olympics in Garmisch-Partenkirchen in late February, where he took his second podium of the season with a second place finish, climbing up from 19th after the first run. This put him in fourth in the World Cup slalom standings, with a chance at winning the World Cup slalom title in the final two races of the season. However, Ryding's hopes were dashed after he straddled and failed to finish the second run of the Flachau night slalom in March, after finishing fifth on the first run. He closed his season by finishing outside of the points in the World Cup Finals in Courchevel, and ended the season in eighth in the World Cup slalom standings, equalling his best result from 2017.

=== 2023 season ===
Before the start of the 2023 season, UK Sport cut funding for Great Britain's alpine skiing programme, despite Ryding's win at the start of 2022. A small fund was ringfenced for Ryding, but this was not enough to cover his coaching. Ryding heavily criticised the decision, telling the BBC, "we have all gone out there on to the world stage and consistently delivered record results over the last 12 months." Consequently, the team, including Ryding, were forced to crowdfund to compete in the 2023 World Cup season.

Ryding's season would not bring the same success of 2022, as he finished outside of the top ten in the first five slalom races of the season. His best result would come in Kitzbühel in January, where Ryding finished second, almost repeating his win from the previous year after setting the fastest second run to climb from 16th. This was his only top ten finish of the season, and he finished the World Cup season in 16th in the slalom standings, his lowest finish since 2016.

At the 2023 World Championships in Courchevel, Ryding finished 13th in the slalom, rising from 21st after the first run.

=== 2024 season ===
Ahead of the start of the 2024 World Cup season, Ryding told the BBC that he had no intention of retiring, despite turning 37 during the season, and did not rule out competing at the 2026 Winter Olympics.

Ryding's season opened in Gurgl in November 2023, where he finished fourth, his best ever start to a season. He climbed 11 places on the second run to finish just 0.01 seconds behind Michael Matt in third. The following month, he took his seventh World Cup podium in Madonna di Campiglio, finishing in third and rising from 15th after the first run. This meant Ryding had achieved podium finishes in four consecutive World Cup seasons.

Ryding took a third top five finish of the season in Kitzbühel in January, where he finished fifth and was one of three Britons in the top 20, ahead of Billy Major and Laurie Taylor. He finished in the top ten for the fourth time in Aspen in early March, with a seventh place finish, and scored points in every slalom race of the season for the first time ever. This meant he ended the season in seventh in the slalom World Cup standings, his highest ever finish.

At the end of the 2024 winter, Ryding moved from Fischer to Head Skis. In October 2024, he told The Ski Podcast that he was still getting to grips with the new skis "figuring out which settings are best" in a "race against time" before the 2024–25 racing season started.

=== 2025 season ===
Ryding finished sixth in the slalom at the World Championships in Saalbach-Hinterglemm, Austria. This was the best result for a British man at the World Championships since 1934.

On 12 June 2025, Ryding announced that he would retire after the Olympics the following year.

=== 2026 season ===
On 23 January 2026, Ryding was announced as part of the Team GB squad for the 2026 Winter Olympics, making it his fifth Olympics. He finished 17th in the men's slalom at the Games in Italy.

== Personal life ==
Ryding's younger sister, Joanna, was also a competitive skier who won several FIS Races before retiring after a crash in 2011.

== World Cup results ==
=== Season standings ===
Season
Season	Age	Overall	Slalom	Giant slalom	Super-G	Downhill	Combined	Parallel
2013	26	136	51	—	—	—	—	—N/a
2015	28	99	30	—	—	—	—	—N/a
2016	29	70	22	—	—	—	—	—N/a
2017	30	23	8	—	—	—	—	—N/a
2018	31	34	11	—	—	—	—	—N/a
2019	32	24	9	—	—	—	—	—N/a
2020	33	57	13	—	—	—	—	—
2021	34	37	12	—	—	—	—N/a	—
2022	35	30	8	—	—	—	—N/a	—
2023	36	45	16	—	—	—	—N/a	—N/a
2024	37	29	7	—	—	—	—N/a	—N/a
2025	38	45	15	—	—	—	—N/a	—N/a
2026	39	74	26	—	—	—	—N/a	—N/a

=== Race podiums ===
- 1 win – (1 SL)
- 7 podiums – (6 SL, 1 Parallel slalom)

Season
Season	Date	Location	Discipline	Place	Notes
2017	22 January 2017	Kitzbühel, Austria	Slalom	2nd	
2019	1 January 2019	Oslo, Norway	Parallel slalom	2nd	
2021	10 January 2021	Adelboden, Switzerland	Slalom	3rd	
2022	22 January 2022	Kitzbühel, Austria	Slalom	1st	
2022	27 February 2022	Garmisch-Partenkirchen, Germany	Slalom	2nd	
2023	22 January 2023	Kitzbühel, Austria	Slalom	2nd	
2024	22 December 2023	Madonna di Campiglio, Italy	Slalom	3rd	

== World Championship results ==
Year
Year	Age	Slalom	Giant slalom	Super-G	Downhill	Combined	Team combined	Parallel	Team event
2009	22	DNF1	41	—	—	—	—N/a	—N/a	—N/a
2011	24	DNF1	39	—	—	—	—N/a	—N/a	—
2013	26	DNF2	—	—	—	—	—N/a	—N/a	—
2015	28	DNF1	—	—	—	—	—N/a	—N/a	—
2017	30	11	—	—	—	—	—N/a	—N/a	—
2019	32	9	—	—	—	—	—N/a	—N/a	9
2021	34	DNF1	—	—	—	—	—N/a	—	—
2023	36	13	—	—	—	—	—N/a	—	—
2025	38	6	—	—	—	—N/a	—	—N/a	—

== Olympic results ==
Year
Year	Age	Slalom	Giant slalom	Super-G	Downhill	Combined	Team combined	Team event
2010	23	27	47	—	—	—	—N/a	—N/a
2014	27	17	—	—	—	—	—N/a	—N/a
2018	31	9	—	—	—	—	—N/a	5
2022	35	13	—	—	—	—	—N/a	—
2026	39	17	—	—	—	—N/a	—	—N/a
