= Joaquim Salarich =

Spanish alpine skier (born 1994)

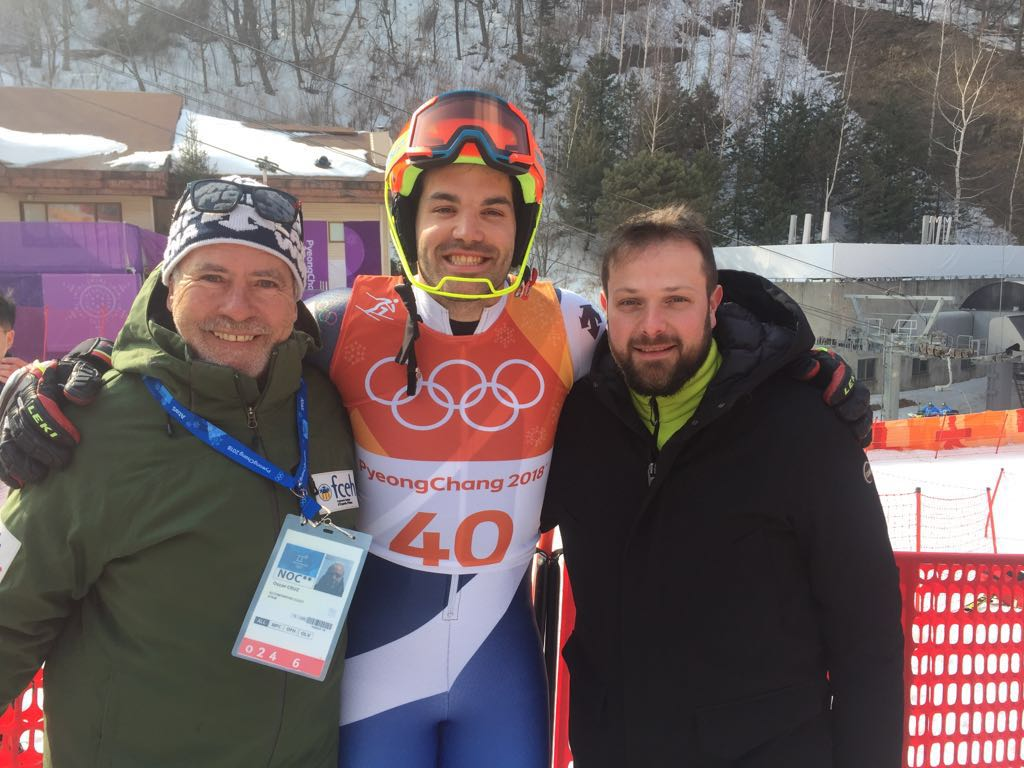
- Salarich (center) in 2018

Personal information
- Born: 2 January 1994 (age 32) Vic, Spain

Skiing career
- Sport: Alpine skiing ♂
- Club: LMCE
- Disciplines: Slalom
- World Cup debut: December 2015 (age 21)

Olympics
- Teams: 2 - (2018, 2022)
- Medals: 0

World Championships
- Teams: 5 - (2015–2023)
- Medals: 0

World Cup
- Seasons: 8 - (2016–2023)
- Podiums: 0
- Overall titles: 0 – (54th in 2022)
- Discipline titles: 0 – (20th in SL, 2022)
Medal record
Men's alpine skiing
Representing Spain

Joaquim Salarich Baucells (born 2 January 1994) is a Spanish World Cup alpine ski racer and specializes in slalom.

He has competed in two Winter Olympics and five World Championships.

== World Cup results ==
=== Season standings ===
Season	Age	Overall	Slalom	Giant slalom	Super-G	Downhill	Combined	Parallel
2022	28	54	20	—	—	—	—N/a	—
2023	29	96	34	—	—	—	—N/a	—N/a

Standings through 20 February 2023

=== Results per discipline ===
Discipline	WC starts	WC Top 30	WC Top 10	WC Top 5	WC Podium	Best result		
Discipline	WC starts	WC Top 30	WC Top 10	WC Top 5	WC Podium	Date	Location	Place
Slalom	34	9	3	1	0	20 March 2022	Méribel, France	5th
Giant slalom	0	0	0	0	0			
Super-G	0	0	0	0	0			
Downhill	0	0	0	0	0			
Combined	0	0	0	0	0			
Total	34	9	3	1	0			

Standings through 26 February 2023

== World Championship results ==
Year
Year	Age	Slalom	Giant; Slalom	Super G	Downhill	Combined	Team Event
2015	21	30	—	—	—	—	—
2017	23	25	—	—	—	—	—
2019	25	DNF1	—	—	—	—	—
2021	27	DNF2	—	—	—	—	—
2023	29	DNF2	—	—	—	—	—

== Olympic results ==
Year
Year	Age	Slalom	Giant; Slalom	Super G	Downhill	Combined
2018	24	DNF2	—	—	—	—
2022	28	DNF1	—	—	—	—
2026	32	19	—	—	—	

Olympic Games
Preceded by Támara Echegoyen and Marcus Walz	Flagbearer for Spain (with Olivia Smart); Milano Cortina 2026	Succeeded by
