= Otmar Striedinger =

Austrian alpine skier (born 1991)

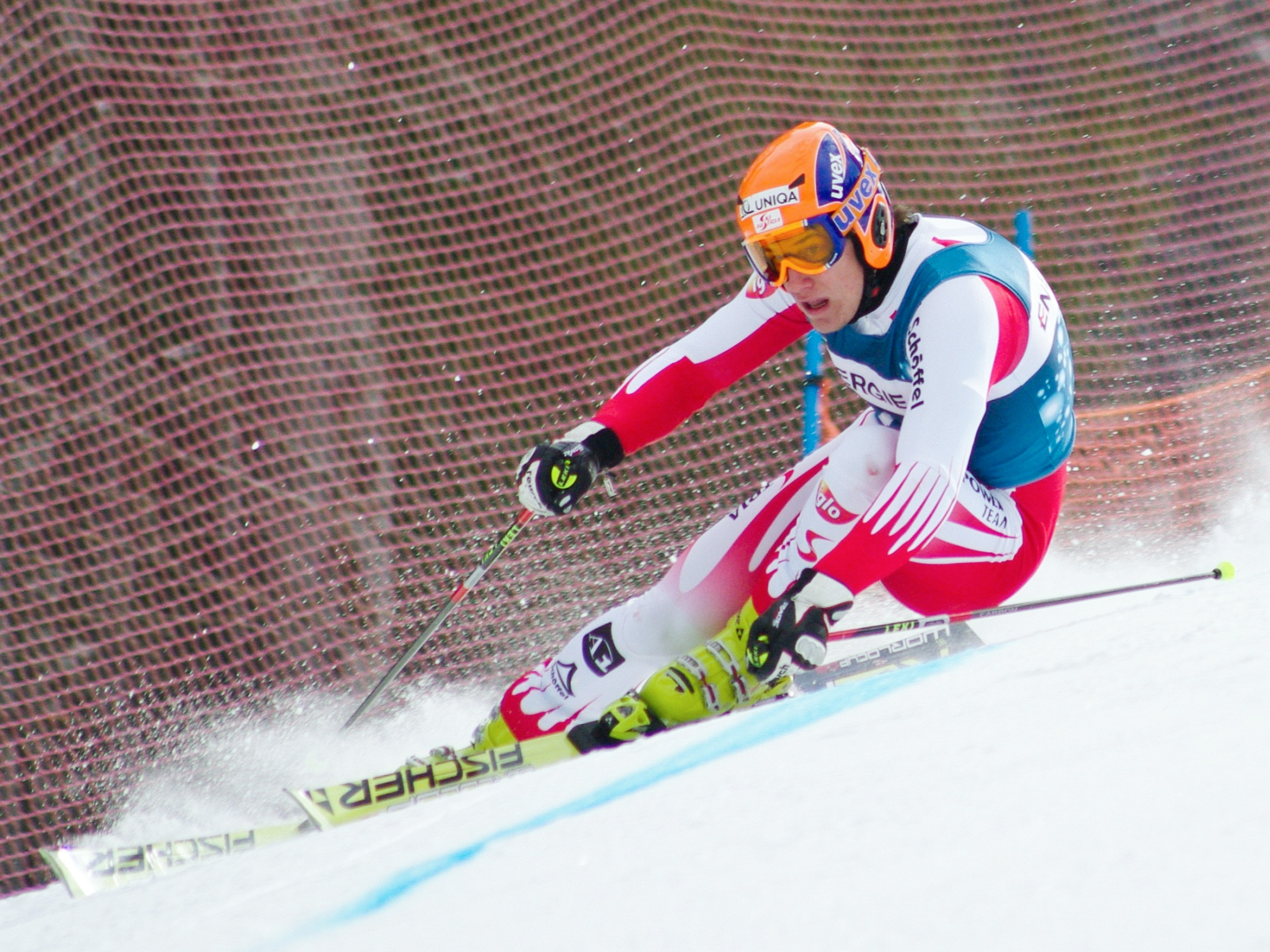
- Striedinger in 2010

Personal information
- Born: 14 April 1991 (age 35) Villach, Carinthia, Austria
- Height: 1.84 m (6 ft 0 in)
- Website: oti-striedinger.at

Skiing career
- Sport: Alpine skiing
- Club: SC Innerkrems-Eisentratten
- Disciplines: Downhill, Super-G
- World Cup debut: 28 November 2010 (age 19)

Olympics
- Teams: 1 – (2014)
- Medals: 0

World Championships
- Teams: 3 – (2015, 2019, 2021)
- Medals: 0

World Cup
- Seasons: 10 – (2013–2022)
- Wins: 0
- Podiums: 5 – (4 DH, 1 SG)
- Overall titles: 0 – (33rd in 2014)
- Discipline titles: 0 – (7th in SG, 2014)
Medal record
Men's alpine skiing
Representing Austria
Junior World Championships
| Bronze medal – third place | 2011 Crans-Montana | Downhill |

Otmar Striedinger (born 14 April 1991) is an Austrian World Cup alpine ski racer.

Born in Villach, Carinthia, Striedinger made his World Cup debut in November 2010 at Lake Louise, Canada. He attained his first World Cup podium in December 2013, a second place in Super-G at Beaver Creek, US.

== World Cup results ==
=== Season standings ===
| Season | Age | Overall | Slalom | Giant slalom | Super-G | Downhill | Combined |
|---|---|---|---|---|---|---|---|
| 2013 | 21 | 110 | — | — | — | 43 | — |
| 2014 | 22 | 33 | — | — | 7 | 22 | — |
| 2015 | 23 | 37 | — | — | 14 | 24 | — |
| 2016 | 24 | 60 | — | — | 37 | 24 | — |
| 2017 | 25 | 118 | — | — | 40 | 50 | — |
| 2018 | 26 | 109 | — | — | — | 34 | — |
| 2019 | 27 | 43 | — | — | 50 | 11 | — |
| 2020 | 28 | 78 | — | — | — | 23 | — |
| 2021 | 29 | 47 | — | — | — | 7 | —N/a |
| 2022 | 30 | 45 | — | — | 52 | 13 | —N/a |
| 2023 | 31 | 39 | — | — | 49 | 13 | —N/a |

Standings through 2 February 2023

=== Race podiums ===
- 0 wins
- 5 podiums – (4 DH, 1 SG); 19 top tens

| Season | Date | Location | Discipline | Place |
|---|---|---|---|---|
| 2014 | 7 Dec 2013 | (United States) Beaver Creek, USA | Super-G | 2nd |
| 2019 | 25 Jan 2019 | Kitzbühel, Austria | Downhill | 3rd |
| 2019 | 13 Mar 2019 | Soldeu, Andorra | Downhill | 3rd |
| 2021 | 13 Dec 2020 | Val d'Isere, France | Downhill | 2nd |
| 2022 | 18 Dec 2021 | Val Gardena, Italy | Downhill | 2nd |

== World Championship results ==
| Year | Age | Slalom | Giant slalom | Super-G | Downhill | Combined |
|---|---|---|---|---|---|---|
| 2015 | 23 | — | — | 24 | — | DNF1 |
| 2019 | 27 | — | — | — | 31 | — |
| 2021 | 29 | — | — | — | 19 | — |

== Olympic results ==
| Year | Age | Slalom | Giant slalom | Super-G | Downhill | Combined |
|---|---|---|---|---|---|---|
| 2014 | 22 | — | — | 5 | — | 21 |
