= Dominik Stehle =

German alpine skier (born 1986)

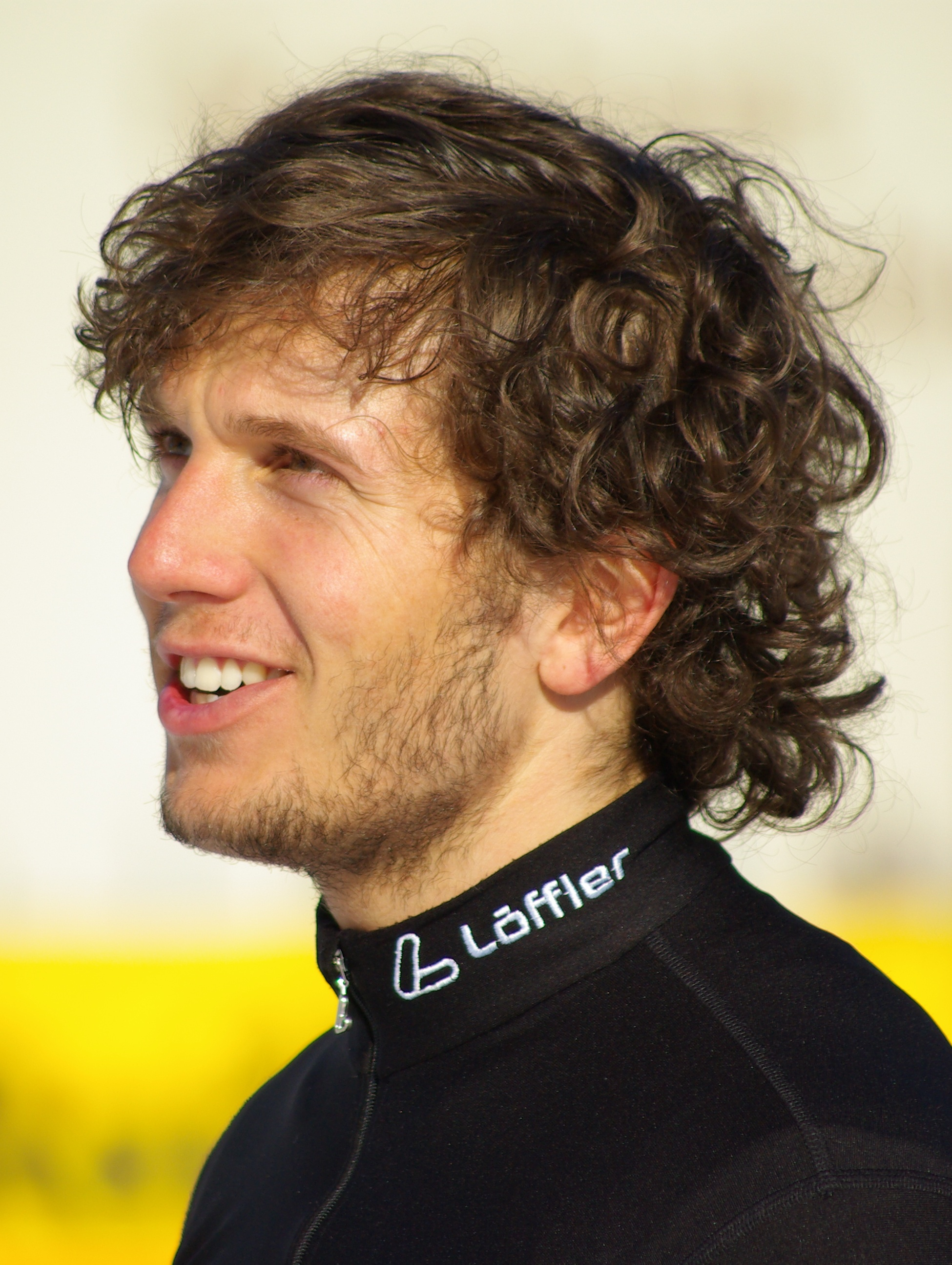

Personal information
- Born: 15 October 1986 (age 39) Garmisch-Partenkirchen, Germany
- Height: 1.76 m (5 ft 9 in)

Skiing career
- Sport: Alpine skiing
- Club: SC Obermaiselstein
- Retired: March 2020 (age 33)
- Disciplines: Slalom
- World Cup debut: 28 January 2006 (age 19)

World Championships
- Teams: 1 − (2019)
- Medals: 0

World Cup
- Seasons: 6 − (2008, 2015–19)
- Podiums: 0
- Overall titles: 0 – (71st in 2016)
- Discipline titles: 0 – (23rd in SL, 2016)

Dominik Stehle (born 15 October 1986) is a German former alpine ski racer.

He competed at the World Championships 2019.

== World Championship results ==
Year	Slalom	Giant slalom	Super-G	Downhill	Combined	Team event
2019	DNF	—	—	—	—	4
