= Anton Tremmel =

German alpine skier

Personal information
- Born: 26 November 1994 (age 31)
- Height: 1.82 m (6 ft 0 in)

Skiing career
- Sport: Alpine skiing
- Club: SC Rottach-Egern
- Disciplines: Slalom
- World Cup debut: 4 January 2018 (age 23)

World Championships
- Teams: 1 − (2019)
- Medals: 0

World Cup
- Seasons: 3 − (2017–19)
- Podiums: 0
- Overall titles: 0 – (104th in 2018)
- Discipline titles: 0 – (33rd in SL, 2018)

Anton Tremmel (born 26 November 1994) is a German alpine ski racer.

He competed at the World Championships 2019.

== World Championship results ==
Year	Slalom	Giant slalom	Super-G	Downhill	Combined	Team event
2019	25	—	—	—	—	4
