= Štefan Hadalin =

Slovenian alpine skier (born 1995)

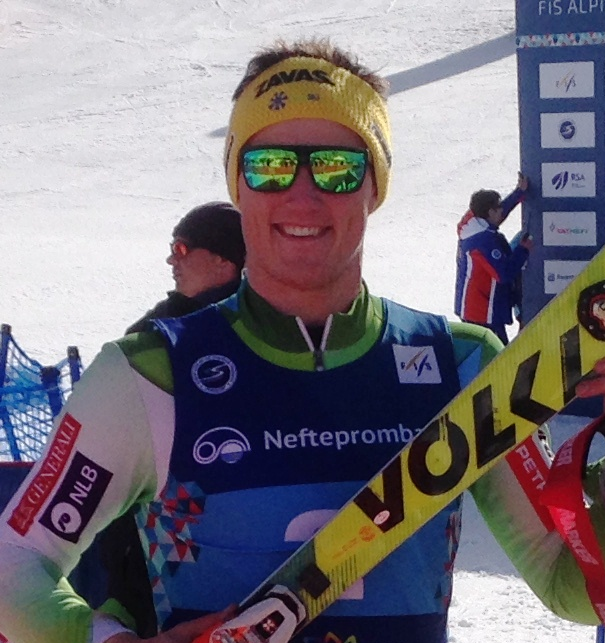
- At Sochi in 2016

Personal information
- Born: 6 June 1995 (age 31)

Skiing career
- Sport: Alpine skiing
- Club: ASA – Sport klub Dol
- Disciplines: Slalom, combined, giant slalom
- World Cup debut: 8 March 2014 (age 18)

Olympics
- Teams: 1 – (2018)
- Medals: 0

World Championships
- Teams: 2 – (2017, 2019)
- Medals: 1 (0 gold)

World Cup
- Seasons: 5 – (2017–2021)
- Wins: 0
- Podiums: 1 – (1 AC)
- Overall titles: 0 – (45th in 2019)
- Discipline titles: 0 – (7th in AC, 2019)
Medal record
Men's alpine skiing
Representing Slovenia
World Championships
Silver medal – second place	2019 Åre	Combined
Junior World Championships
Gold medal – first place	2016 Sochi	Combined
Gold medal – first place	2016 Sochi	Team
Silver medal – second place	2015 Hajfell	Super-G
Silver medal – second place	2015 Hajfell	Combined

Štefan Hadalin (born 6 June 1995) is a Slovenian retired World Cup alpine ski racer.

== World Cup results ==
=== Season standings ===
Season
Season	Age	Overall	Slalom	Giant slalom	Super-G	Downhill	Combined	Parallel
2017	21	93	35	—	—	—	34	awarded with SL, GS
2018	22	79	33	40	—	—	—	awarded with SL, GS
2019	23	45	19	—	—	—	7	awarded with SL, GS
2020	24	54	20	44	—	—	25	33
2021	25	40	22	29	—	—	—	17
2022	26	98	—	45	—	—	—	8
2023	27	84	43	33	—	—	—	8
2024	28	retired mid-season, no points						

Standings through 14 January 2024

=== Results per discipline ===
Discipline	WC starts	WC Top 30	WC Podiums	Best result		
Discipline	WC starts	WC Top 30	WC Podiums	Date	Location	Place
Slalom	65	35	0	8 January 2020	Madonna di Campiglio, Italy	7th
Giant slalom	45	12	0	13 March 2021 & 23 October 2022	Bansko, Bulgaria & Sölden, Austria	9th
Super-G	3	0	0	29 February 2020	Hinterstoder, Austria	48th
Downhill	0	0	0			
Combined	11	6	1	22 February 2019	Bansko, Bulgaria	3rd
Parallel slalom	2	2	0	14 November 2021	Lech/Zürs, Austria	8th
Parallel-G	2	2	0	9 February 2020	(France) Chamonix, Italy	21st
Total	128	57	1			

Results through 14 January 2023

=== Race podiums ===
- 1 podium – (1 Combined)

Season
Season	Date	Location	Discipline	Place
2019	22 February 2019	Bansko, Bulgaria	Combined	3rd

== World Championship results ==
Year
Year	Age	Slalom	Giant; Slalom	Super G	Downhill	Combined	Team Event	Parallel
2017	21	10	28	—	—	28	9	—N/a
2019	23	DNS2	22	—	—	2	9	—N/a
2021	25	7	16	—	—	—	—	16
2023	27	did not compete						

== Olympic results ==
Year
Year	Age	Slalom	Giant; Slalom	Super G	Downhill	Combined	Team Event
2018	22	DNF1	21	—	—	8	9
2022	26	did not compete					
