= Mauro Caviezel =

Swiss alpine skier (born 1988)

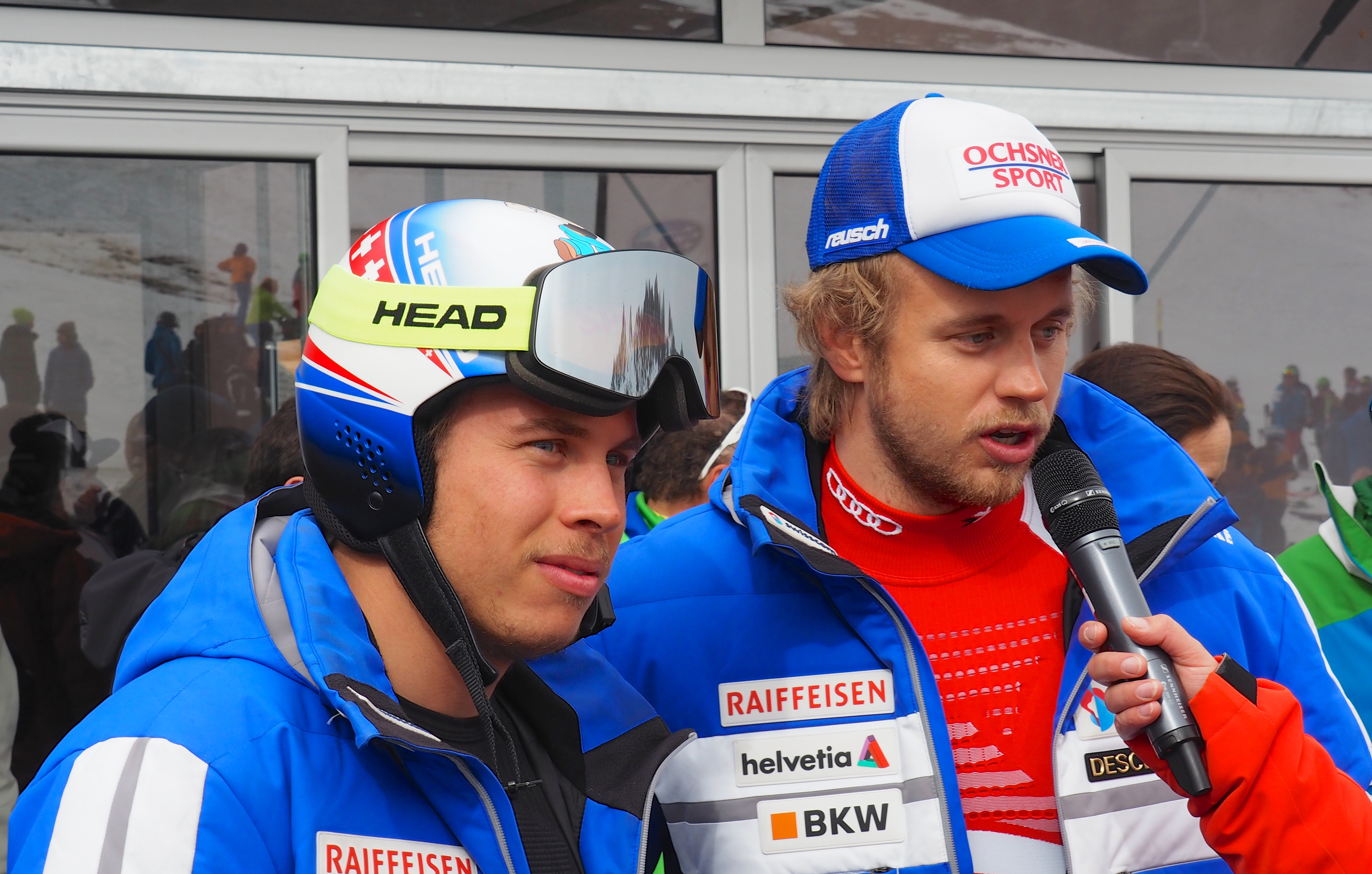
- Gino and Mauro Caviezel in 2016

Personal information
- Born: 18 August 1988 (age 37) Tomils, Graubünden, Switzerland
- Height: 1.81 m (5 ft 11 in)

Skiing career
- Sport: Alpine skiing
- Club: Beverin
- Disciplines: Super-G, Downhill, Combined
- World Cup debut: 9 March 2008 (age 19)

Olympics
- Teams: 2 – (2014, 2018)
- Medals: 0

World Championships
- Teams: 4 – (2015-2021)
- Medals: 1 (0 gold)

World Cup
- Seasons: 12 – (2008-2012, 2014–2015, 2017–2021)
- Wins: 1
- Podiums: 11 – (8 SG, 2 DH, 1 AC)
- Overall titles: 0 – (7th in 2019, 2020)
- Discipline titles: 1 – SG, 2020
Medal record
World Championships
| Bronze medal – third place | 2017 St. Moritz | Combined |
Junior World Ski Championships
| Silver medal – second place | 2006 Quebec | Combined |

Mauro Caviezel (born 18 August 1988) is a Swiss World Cup alpine ski racer. He competed for Switzerland in two Winter Olympics and three World Championships; he won a bronze medal in the combined event in 2017 at St. Moritz.

Through December 2020, Caviezel has twelve World Cup podiums; his first was a tie for third in the super-G at the World Cup finals in March 2017. His first win came in a super-G in December 2020. He is the older brother of giant slalom specialist Gino Caviezel (b.1992).

== World Cup results ==
=== Season standings ===
| Season | Age | Overall | Slalom | Giant slalom | Super-G | Downhill | Combined |
|---|---|---|---|---|---|---|---|
| 2014 | 25 | 77 | — | — | — | — | 6 |
| 2015 | 26 | 42 | — | — | 19 | 38 | 8 |
| 2016 | 27 | injured | | | | | |
| 2017 | 28 | 32 | — | — | 10 | 24 | 10 |
| 2018 | 29 | 23 | — | — | 15 | 12 | 5 |
| 2019 | 30 | 7 | — | — | 3 | 5 | 3 |
| 2020 | 31 | 7 | — | — | 1 | 10 | 8 |
| 2021 | 32 | 5 | — | — | 4 | 11 | — |

Standings through 30 December 2020

=== Race podiums ===
- 1 win
- 12 podiums – (9 SG, 2 DH, 1 AC)

| Season | Date | Location | Discipline | Position |
|---|---|---|---|---|
| 2017 | 16 Mar 2017 | (United States) Aspen, USA | Super-G | 3rd |
| 2019 | 25 Nov 2018 | Lake Louise, Canada | Super-G | 3rd |
| 2019 | 30 Nov 2018 | (United States) Beaver Creek, USA | Downhill | 2nd |
| 2019 | 1 Dec 2018 | (United States) Beaver Creek, USA | Super-G | 2nd |
| 2019 | 14 Mar 2019 | Soldeu, Andorra | Super-G | 2nd |
| 2020 | 1 Dec 2019 | Lake Louise, Canada | Super-G | 3rd |
| 2020 | 13 Feb 2020 | Saalbach, Austria | Downhill | 3rd |
| 2020 | 14 Feb 2020 | Saalbach, Austria | Super-G | 2nd |
| 2020 | 29 Feb 2020 | Hinterstoder, Austria | Super-G | 2nd |
| 2020 | 1 Mar 2020 | Hinterstoder, Austria | Combined | 2nd |
| 2021 | 12 Dec 2020 | Val d'Isere, France | Super-G | 1st |
| 2021 | 18 Dec 2020 | Val Gardena, Italy | Super-G | 2nd |

== World Championship results ==
| Year | Age | Slalom | Giant slalom | Super-G | Downhill | Combined |
|---|---|---|---|---|---|---|
| 2015 | 26 | — | — | 17 | — | — |
| 2017 | 28 | — | — | 20 | 21 | 3 |
| 2019 | 30 | — | — | DNF | 9 | 7 |
| 2021 | 32 | — | — | DNF | — | — |

== Olympic results ==
| Year | Age | Slalom | Giant slalom | Super-G | Downhill | Combined |
|---|---|---|---|---|---|---|
| 2014 | 25 | — | 28 | — | — | DNF2 |
| 2018 | 29 | — | — | DNF | 13 | 12 |
| 2022 | 33 | Injured, did not compete | | | | |
