= Jeffrey Read =

Canadian alpine skier (born 1997)

Personal information
- Born: 1 October 1997 (age 28) Calgary, Alberta, Canada
- Family: Ken Read (father); Erik Read (brother)

Skiing career
- Country: Canada
- Sport: Alpine skiing
- Club: Banff Alpine Racers
- Disciplines: Downhill, Super-G, Combined
- World Cup debut: 12 January 2018 (age 20)

Olympics
- Teams: 1 – (2026)
- Medals: 0

World Championships
- Teams: 4 – (2019–2025)
- Medals: 1 (0 gold)

World Cup
- Seasons: 9 – (2018–2026)
- Wins: 0
- Podiums: 1 − (1 SG)
- Overall titles: 0 − (35th in 2024)
- Discipline titles: 0 − (10th in SG, 2024)
Medal record
Men's alpine skiing
Representing Canada
World Championships
Bronze medal – third place	2023 Méribel	Team event
Junior World Championships
Gold medal – first place	2017 Åre	Team event

Jeffrey Read (born 1 October 1997) is a Canadian World Cup alpine ski racer. He specializes in the speed events of downhill and super-G, and made his World Cup debut in January 2018.

Read is the son of the alpine ski racer Ken Read (b.1955), one of the "Crazy Canucks" and winner of five World Cup downhill races. His older brother Erik (b.1991) is also a World Cup alpine racer, specializing in the technical events.

== World Cup results ==
=== Season standings ===
Season
Season	Age	Overall	Slalom	Giant slalom	Super-G	Downhill
2021	23	102	—	—	40	44
2022	24	96	—	—	50	36
2023	25	50	—	—	17	45
2024	26	35	—	—	10	35
2025	27	98	—	—	32	59
2026	28	109	—	—	42	55

Standings through 7 February 2026

=== Top ten finishes ===
- 0 wins
- 1 podium (1 SG), 7 top tens (5 SG, 2 DH)

Season
Season	Date	Location	Discipline	Place
2022	5 Mar 2022	Kvitfjell, Norway	Downhill	7th
2023	28 Jan 2023	Cortina d'Ampezzo, Italy	Super-G	7th
2023	16 Mar 2023	Soldeu, Andorra	Super-G	5th
2024	15 Dec 2023	Val Gardena, Italy	Super-G	10th
2024	17 Feb 2024	Kvitfjell, Norway	Downhill	6th
2024	18 Feb 2024	Kvitfjell, Norway	Super-G	2nd
2024	22 Mar 2024	Saalbach, Austria	Super-G	9th

== World Championship results ==
Year
Year	Age	Slalom	Giant slalom	Super-G	Downhill	Combined	Team combined	Parallel	Team event
2019	21	—	—	—	41	29	—N/a	—N/a	—
2021	23	—	—	18	26	22	—N/a	BDNF	7
2023	25	—	—	11	31	DNF2	—N/a	BDNF	3
2025	27	—	—	10	29	—N/a	—	—N/a	—

== Olympic results ==
Year
Year	Age	Slalom	Giant slalom	Super-G	Downhill	Team combined
2026	28	—	—	—	25	—
