= Manuel Schmid (skier) =

German alpine skier

Personal information
- Born: 9 February 1993 (age 33)
- Height: 1.75 m (5 ft 9 in)

Skiing career
- Sport: Alpine skiing
- Club: SC Fischen
- Disciplines: Super-G
- World Cup debut: 1 December 2008

World Championships
- Teams: 1 − (2019)

World Cup
- Seasons: 2 − (2018, 2019)

Manuel Schmid (born 9 February 1993) is a German World Cup alpine ski racer, specializing in Super-G.

He participated in the FIS Alpine World Ski Championships 2019. He is older brother of Alexander Schmid.

== World Championship results ==
Year	Slalom	Giant slalom	Super-G	Downhill	Combined
2019	—	—	DNF	32	—
