= 2018 Alpine Skiing World Cup – Men's combined =

Alpine ski discipline year standings

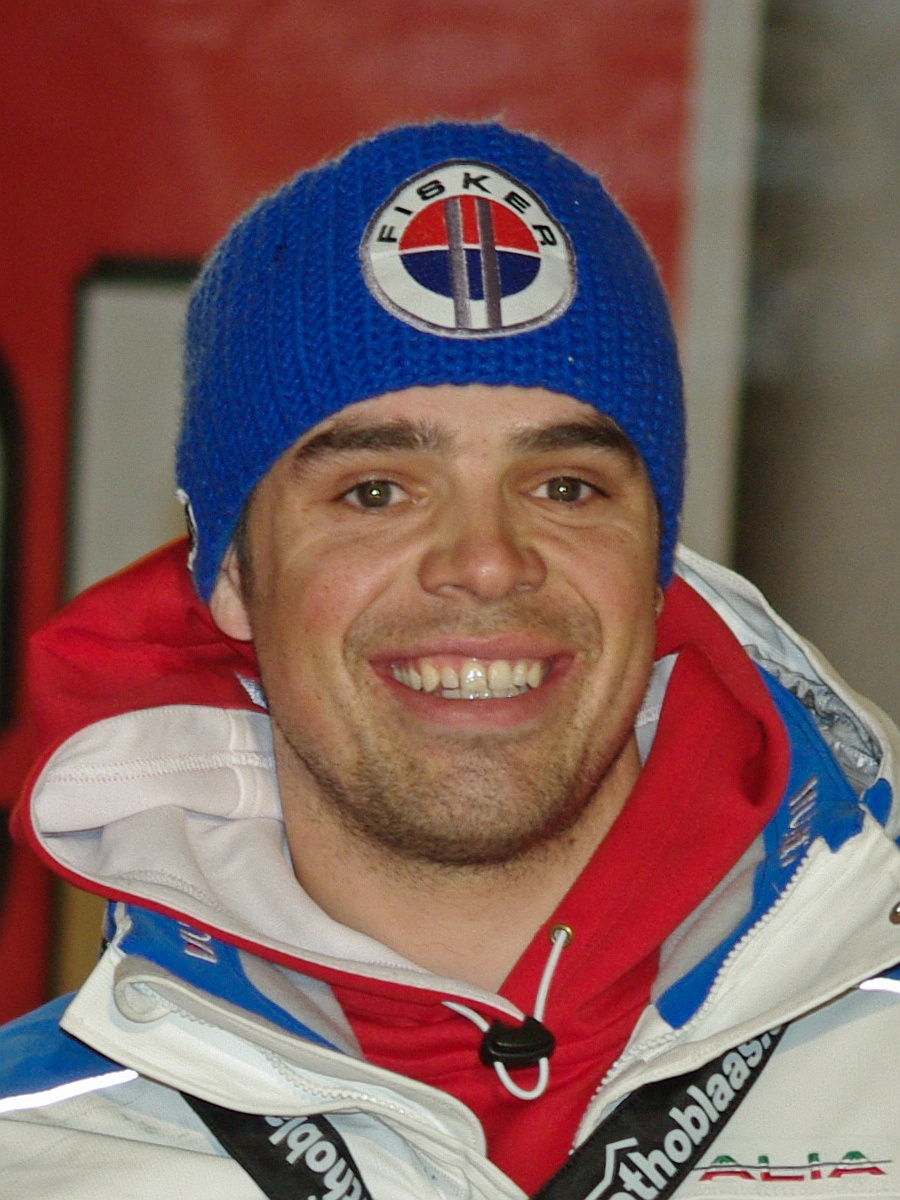
2018 Men's combined World Cup: Peter Fill of Italy, season champion; 2018 Men's World Cup; Overall • Downhill • Super-G; Giant slalom • Slalom • Combined
Previous: 2017	Next: 2019

The Men's combined in the 2018 FIS Alpine Skiing World Cup involved two events. Peter Fill of Italy won the season title when he finished third in the difficult Alpine combined at Wengen, behind first-time World Cup winner Victor Muffat-Jeandet of France, who ended up third in the discipline for the season.

The season was interrupted by the 2018 Winter Olympics from 12-24 February 2018 at Yongpyong Alpine Centre (slalom and giant slalom) at the Alpensia Sports Park in PyeongChang and at the Jeongseon Alpine Centre (speed events) in Jeongseon, South Korea. The men's combined was held on 13 February.

At this time, combined races were not included in the season finals, which were scheduled in 2018 in Åre, Sweden.

== Standings ==
#	Skier	29 Dec 2017; Bormio (Italy)	12 Jan 2018; Wengen (Switzerland)	Tot.
	(Italy) Peter Fill	80	60	140
2	(Norway) Kjetil Jansrud	60	50	110
3	(France) Victor Muffat-Jeandet	5	100	105
4	(France) Alexis Pinturault	100	DNS	100
5	(Switzerland) Mauro Caviezel	50	40	90
6	(Russia) Pavel Trikhichev	DNS	80	80
7	(Austria) Matthias Mayer	40	32	72
8	(Germany) Thomas Dreßen	45	18	63
9	(Switzerland) Justin Murisier	12	36	48
10	(Canada) Broderick Thompson	32	14	46
11	(Italy) Dominik Paris	DNF2	45	45
12	(Austria) Romed Baumann	26	16	42
13	(United States) Bryce Bennett	12	29	41
	(Slovenia) Martin Čater	36	5	41
15	(Norway) Aleksander Aamodt Kilde	13	26	39
16	(United States) Ryan Cochran-Siegle	18	13	31
17	(Switzerland) Gian Luca Barandun	29	DNF2	29
	(Italy) Riccardo Tonetti	20	9	29
19	(United States) Jared Goldberg	16	12	28
20	(Slovenia) Klemen Kosi	22	4	26
21	(Italy) Christof Innerhofer	24	DNF2	24
	(United States) Ted Ligety	DNS	24	24
23	(Austria) Marco Schwarz	DNS	22	22
24	(France) Thomas Mermillod-Blondin	DNS	20	20
25	(Austria) Frederic Berthold	DNF2	15	15
	(Sweden) Felix Monsén	8	7	15
	(Switzerland) Ralph Weber	15	0	15
	References			

- Winner
- 2nd place
- 3rd place
- DNS = Did not start
- DNS2 = Finished run 1; did not start run 2
- DNF1 = Did not finish run 1
- DNF2 = Did not finish run 2
- Updated at 18 March 2018, after all events.

== See also ==
- 2018 Alpine Skiing World Cup – Men's summary rankings
- 2018 Alpine Skiing World Cup – Men's overall
- 2018 Alpine Skiing World Cup – Men's downhill
- 2018 Alpine Skiing World Cup – Men's super-G
- 2018 Alpine Skiing World Cup – Men's giant slalom
- 2018 Alpine Skiing World Cup – Men's slalom
