= Adur Etxezarreta =

Spanish alpine skier (born 1996)

Personal information
- Full name: Adur Etxezarreta Rezola
- Nationality: Spain
- Born: 27 January 1996 (age 30) Areso, Spain
- Height: 1.83 m (6 ft 0 in)

Sport
- Sport: Skiing
- Club: Navarra Ski Club

Adur Etxezarreta Rezola (Note: In this Spanish name, the first or paternal surname is Etxezarreta and the second or maternal family name is Rezola.) (born 27 January 1996) is a Spanish alpine skier who represented Spain at the 2022 Winter Olympics.

== Olympic results ==
Year
| Year | Age | Slalom | Giant; Slalom | Super G | Downhill | Combined |
| 2022 | 26 | — | — | DNF | 17 | — |

== World Championship results ==
Year
| Year | Age | Slalom | Giant; Slalom | Super G | Downhill | Combined | Team Event |
| 2019 | 23 | — | — | DNF | 40 | — | — |
| 2021 | 25 | — | — | DNF | DNF | — | — |
