= Felix Monsén =

Swedish alpine ski racer (born 1994)

Personal information
- Born: 6 November 1994 (age 31)

Skiing career
- Country: Sweden
- Sport: Alpine skiing
- Club: Åre Slk
- Disciplines: Downhill, super-G, combined
- World Cup debut: 8 March 2015 (age 20)

World Championships
- Teams: 4 – (2017–2021, 2025)
- Medals: 0

World Cup
- Seasons: 10 – (2015, 2017–2022, 2024–2026)
- Podiums: 0
- Overall titles: 0 – (73rd in 2021)
- Discipline titles: 0 – (27th in AC, 2018)

Felix Monsén (born 6 November 1994) is a Swedish alpine ski racer.

== World Cup Results ==
=== Season standings ===
Season
Season	Age	Overall	Slalom	Giant slalom	Super-G	Downhill	Combined
2017	22	158	—	—	56	52	—
2018	23	129	—	—	—	—	27
2019	24	124	—	—	—	49	38
2020	25	115	—	—	45	45	—
2021	26	73	—	—	29	32	—N/a
2022	27	117	—	—	49	43	—N/a
2023	28	did not compete					—N/a
2024	29	no World Cup points earned					—N/a
2025	30	81	—	—	30	45	—N/a
2026	31	89	—	—	56	52	—N/a

=== Top-ten finishes ===
- 0 podiums; 2 top tens

Season
Season	Date	Location	Discipline	Place
2025	24 January 2025	Kitzbühel, Austria	Super-G	10th
2026	24 January 2026	Kitzbühel, Austria	Downhill	10th

== World Championship results ==
Year
Year	Age	Slalom	Giant slalom	Super G	Downhill	Combined	Team combined
2017	22	—	—	DNF1	16	DNF2	—N/a
2019	24	—	—	19	16	10	—N/a
2021	26	—	—	DNF	17	DNF2	—N/a
2025	30	—	—	20	16	—N/a	11
