= Riccardo Tonetti =

Italian alpine skier

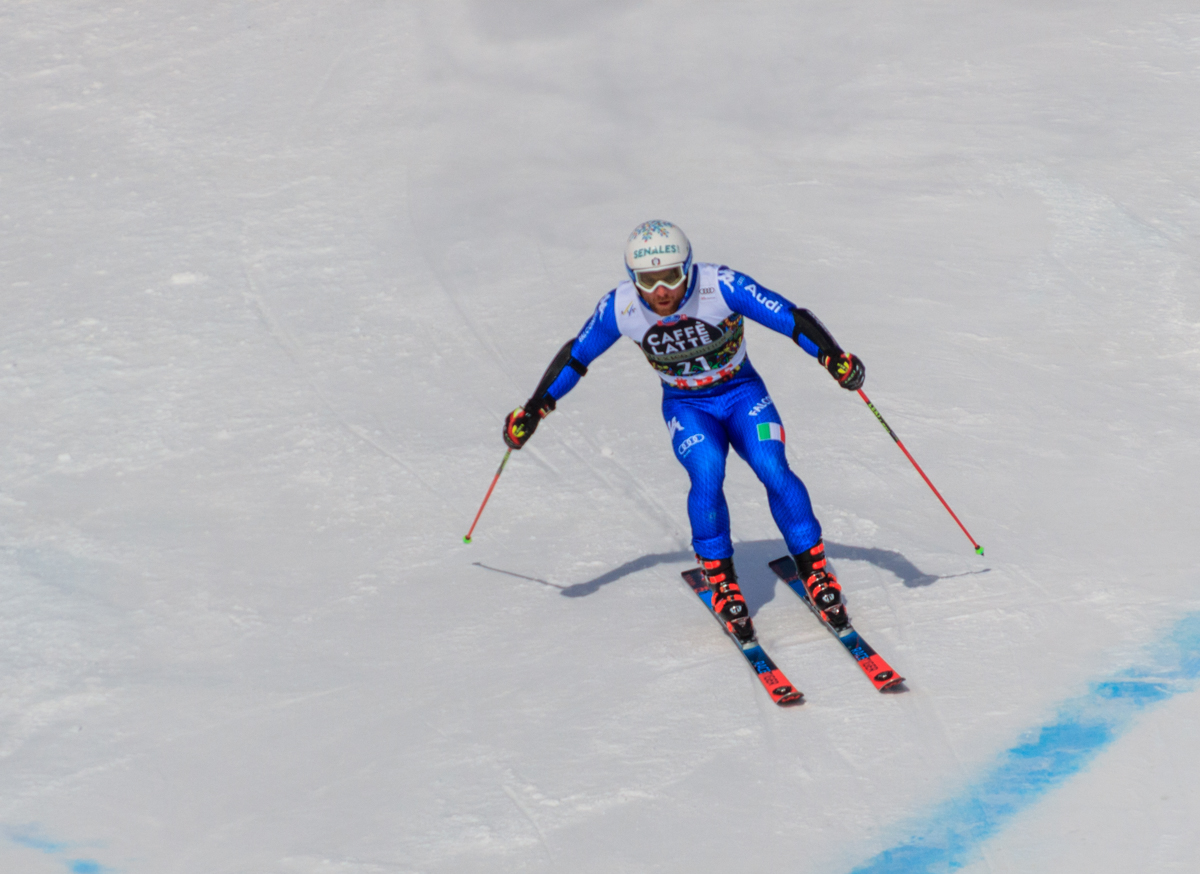
- March 2018

Personal information
- Born: 14 May 1989 (age 37) Bolzano, South Tyrol, Italy
- Height: 1.78 m (5 ft 10 in)

Skiing career
- Sport: Alpine skiing
- Club: GS Fiamme Gialle
- Retired: 7 January 2023 (age 33)
- Disciplines: Giant slalom, slalom, combined
- World Cup debut: 26 January 2010 (age 20)

Olympics
- Teams: 1 – (2018)
- Medals: 0

World Championships
- Teams: 2 – (2017, 2019)
- Medals: 1 (team) (0 gold)

World Cup
- Seasons: 10 – (2012–2021)
- Podiums: 0
- Overall titles: 0 – (35th in 2020)
- Discipline titles: 0 – (3rd in AC, 2020)
Medal record
World Championships
Bronze medal – third place	2019 Åre	Team event

Riccardo Patrizio Tonetti (born 14 May 1989) is an Italian World Cup retired alpine ski racer. His last world cup race was a giant slalom in Adelboden on 7 January 2023.

== World Cup results ==
=== Season standings ===
Season
Season	Age	Overall	Slalom	Giant; Slalom	Super G	Downhill	Combined
2012	22	152	55	—	—	—	—
2013	23	126	49	—	—	—	—
2014	24	140	49	—	—	—	—
2015	25	128	44	—	—	—	—
2016	26	36	32	19	44	—	14
2017	27	88	46	31	—	—	—
2018	28	65	56	22	—	—	18
2019	29	39	38	22	—	—	4
2020	30	35	44	31	—	—	3
2021	31	71	51	26	—	—	—
2022	32	130	—	44	42	—	—

Standings through 18 January 2023

=== Top ten results ===
- 0 podiums; 13 top tens (6 GS, 7 AC)

== World Championships results ==
Year
Year	Age	Slalom	Giant; Slalom	Super G	Downhill	Combined	Team Event
2017	27	—	DNF1	—	—	4	—
2019	29	—	10	—	—	23	3

== Olympic results ==
Year
Year	Age	Slalom	Giant; Slalom	Super G	Downhill	Combined	Team Event
2018	28	DNF1	DNF2	—	—	18	5
