= Ivan Kovbasnyuk =

Ukrainian alpine skier (born 1993)

Personal information
- Full name: Ivan Kovbasnyuk
- Born: 18 May 1993 (age 33) Yasinia, Rakhiv Raion, Zakarpattia Oblast, Ukraine
- Height: 176 cm (5 ft 9 in)

Sport
- Sport: Skiing
- Updated on 3 January 2026

Ivan Kovbasnyuk (born 18 May 1993) is a Ukrainian alpine skier. He represented Ukraine at the 2018 and 2022 Winter Olympics.

== Skiing career ==
Kovbasnyuk began skiing at the age of three. His mother, who worked as an alpine skiing coach, introduced him to the sport.

As of December 2025, his best individual performance at the World Championships was 30th in slalom at the 2021 Championships. As of December 2025, he participated three times at World Cup: twice (2015, 2017) in giant slalom in Sölden, Austria, and once (2018) in super-G in Val Gardena, Italy, where he finished 61st. His best World Cup result was 58th in giant slalom in Sölden, Austria, on 25 October 2015.

In 2022, Kovbasnyuk was nominated for his second Winter Games in Beijing. He finished 14th in the combined event.

He participated at the 2013 and 2017 Winter Universiade (but did not start in any event in 2017). His best finish was 34th in downhill in 2013.

== Personal life ==
After the 2023 World Cup, Kovbasnyuk had to join the military service against the Russian invasion of Ukraine.

== Results ==
=== Winter Olympics results ===
Year
Year	Age	Slalom	Giant; Slalom	Super G	Downhill	Combined	Team Event
2018	24	DNF1	57	DNF	49	DNF2	—
2022	28	DNF1	—	32	33	14	—

=== World Championships results ===
Year
Year	Age	Slalom	Giant; Slalom	Super G	Downhill	Combined	Team; Combined	Team; Event
2013	19	DNF1	73	65	—	—	—N/a	—
2015	21	37	55	—	—	—	—N/a	—
2017	23	47	DNF1	48	—	—	—N/a	—
2019	25	DNF1	52	48	54	DNF2	—N/a	—
2021	27	30	60	DNF	—	DNF2	—N/a	—
2023	29	DNF1	42	43	—	DNF2	—N/a	—
2025	31	—	DNF1	DNF	54	—N/a	26	—

=== World Cup ===
==== Results per discipline ====
Discipline	WC starts	WC Podium	WC Top 5	WC Top 15	WC Top 30	Best result		
Discipline	WC starts	WC Podium	WC Top 5	WC Top 15	WC Top 30	Date	Location	Place
Slalom	0	0	0	0	0			
Giant slalom	2	0	0	0	0	25 October 2015	Sölden, Austria	58th
Super-G	1	0	0	0	0	14 December 2018	Val Gardena, Italy	61st
Downhill	0	0	0	0	0			
Combined	0	0	0	0	0			
Total	3	0	0	0	0			

- Standings through 3 January 2026.

=== European Cup ===
==== Results per discipline ====
Discipline	EC starts	EC Podium	EC Top 5	EC Top 15	EC Top 30	Best result		
Discipline	EC starts	EC Podium	EC Top 5	EC Top 15	EC Top 30	Date	Location	Place
Slalom	0	0	0	0	0			
Giant slalom	0	0	0	0	0			
Super-G	18	0	0	0	0	21 January 2025	Reiteralm, Austria	54th
Downhill	26	0	0	0	0	13 January 2023	Sella Nevea, Italy	58th
Combined	2	0	0	0	0	11 December 2015	Sölden, Austria	60th
Total	46	0	0	0	0			

- Standings through 2 January 2026.

== Personal life ==
He graduated from Precarpathian National University in Ivano-Frankivsk.
