= FIS Alpine World Ski Championships 2019 – Men's downhill =

Men's downhill at the FIS Alpine World Ski Championships 2019
- Venue: Åre ski resort
- Location: Åre, Sweden
- Dates: 9 February
- Competitors: 58 from 25 nations
- Winning time: 1:19.98

Medalists
gold medal	Kjetil Jansrud	Norway
silver medal	Aksel Lund Svindal	Norway
bronze medal	Vincent Kriechmayr	Austria

Men's Downhill
- Location: Olympia; Åre, Sweden
- Vertical: 637 m (2,090 ft)
- Top elevation: 1,033 m (3,389 ft)
- Base elevation: 396 m (1,299 ft)
- Longest run: 2.172 km (1.35 mi)

The Men's downhill competition at the FIS Alpine World Ski Championships 2019 was held on Saturday, 9 February.

In the final event of his international career, Aksel Lund Svindal won the silver medal, two-hundredths of a second behind compatriot and training partner Kjetil Jansrud.

The race course was 2.172 km (1.35 mi) in length, with a vertical drop of 637 m (2,090 ft) from a starting elevation of 1,033 m (3,389 ft) above sea level. Jansrud's winning time of 79.98 seconds yielded an average speed of 97.764 km/h (60.7 mph) and an average vertical descent rate of 7.9645 m/s (26.1 ft/s).

== Results ==
Delayed an hour due to weather, the race started at 13:30 CET (UTC+1) under mostly cloudy skies. Snowing during the race, its start was lowered 234 m (768 ft) to the super-G start, shortening the length by 0.95 km (0.59 mi) to 2.172 km (1.35 mi). The air temperature was −6 °C (21 °F) at the starting gate and −4 °C (25 °F) at the finish.

Rank	Bib	Name	Country	Time	Diff
1st place, gold medalist(s)	6	Kjetil Jansrud	Norway	1:19.98	—
2nd place, silver medalist(s)	9	Aksel Lund Svindal	Norway	1:20.00	+0.02
3rd place, bronze medalist(s)	17	Vincent Kriechmayr	Austria	1:20.31	+0.33
4	15	Beat Feuz	Switzerland	1:20.42	+0.44
5	5	Matthias Mayer	Austria	1:20.63	+0.65
6	13	Dominik Paris	Italy	1:20.72	+0.74
7	4	Benjamin Thomsen	Canada	1:20.73	+0.75
8	7	Aleksander Aamodt Kilde	Norway	1:20.80	+0.82
9	11	Bryce Bennett	United States	1:20.81	+0.83
9	3	Mauro Caviezel	Switzerland	1:20.81	+0.83
11	19	Christof Innerhofer	Italy	1:20.97	+0.99
12	35	Ryan Cochran-Siegle	United States	1:21.00	+1.02
13	23	Matteo Marsaglia	Italy	1:21.15	+1.17
14	30	Adrian Smiseth Sejersted	Norway	1:21.18	+1.20
15	2	Adrien Théaux	France	1:21.23	+1.25
16	32	Felix Monsén	Sweden	1:21.25	+1.27
17	28	Mattia Casse	Italy	1:21.35	+1.37
17	14	Johan Clarey	France	1:21.35	+1.37
19	12	Brice Roger	France	1:21.38	+1.40
20	36	Boštjan Kline	Slovenia	1:21.45	+1.45
21	24	Niels Hintermann	Switzerland	1:21.45	+1.47
22	39	Christoffer Faarup	Denmark	1:21.47	+1.49
23	20	Steven Nyman	United States	1:21.55	+1.57
24	40	Henrik von Appen	Chile	1:21.56	+1.58
25	29	Dominik Schwaiger	Germany	1:21.57	+1.59
26	27	Travis Ganong	United States	1:21.63	+1.65
27	33	Miha Hrobat	Slovenia	1:21.70	+1.82
28	10	Josef Ferstl	Germany	1:21.83	+1.85
29	1	Hannes Reichelt	Austria	1:21.87	+1.89
30	22	Maxence Muzaton	France	1:21.90	+1.92
31	18	Otmar Striedinger	Austria	1:21.92	+1.94
32	25	Manuel Schmid	Germany	1:21.95	+1.97
33	26	Brodie Seger	Canada	1:22.03	+2.05
34	41	Olle Sundin	Sweden	1:22.30	+2.32
35	8	Carlo Janka	Switzerland	1:22.38	+2.40
36	16	Gilles Roulin	Switzerland	1:22.39	+2.41
37	56	Linus Straßer	Germany	1:22.45	+2.47
38	31	Marko Vukićević	Serbia	1:22.46	+2.48
39	38	Andreas Romar	Finland	1:22.48	+2.50
40	45	Adur Etxezarreta	Spain	1:22.54	+2.56
41	42	Jack Gower	Great Britain	1:22.59	+2.61
41	34	Jeffrey Read	Canada	1:22.59	+2.61
43	21	Klemen Kosi	Slovenia	1:22.90	+2.92
44	43	Marc Oliveras	Andorra	1:23.14	+3.16
45	49	Filip Platter	Sweden	1:23.24	+3.26
46	37	Alexander Köll	Sweden	1:23.29	+3.31
47	50	Jan Zabystřan	Czech Republic	1:23.33	+3.35
48	53	Tomáš Klinský	Czech Republic	1:23.72	+3.74
49	58	Yuri Danilochkin	Belarus	1:23.90	+3.92
50	46	Ondřej Berndt	Czech Republic	1:24.06	+4.08
51	47	Martin Bendík	Slovakia	1:24.12	+4.14
52	61	Simon Breitfuss Kammerlander	Bolivia	1:24.30	+4.32
53	54	Sven von Appen	Chile	1:24.93	+4.95
54	57	Ivan Kovbasnyuk	Ukraine	1:25.81	+5.83
55	60	Albin Tahiri	Kosovo	1:25.84	+5.86
56	59	Elvis Opmanis	Latvia	1:26.64	+6.66
57	55	Ioan Valeriu Achiriloaie	Romania	1:27.00	+7.02
—	52	Matej Prieložný	Slovakia	Did not finish	
—	44	Natko Zrnčić-Dim	Croatia	Did not start	
—	48	Filip Zubčić	Croatia	Did not start	
—	51	Štefan Hadalin	Slovenia	Did not start	
