= Dominik Schwaiger =

German alpine skier (born 1991)

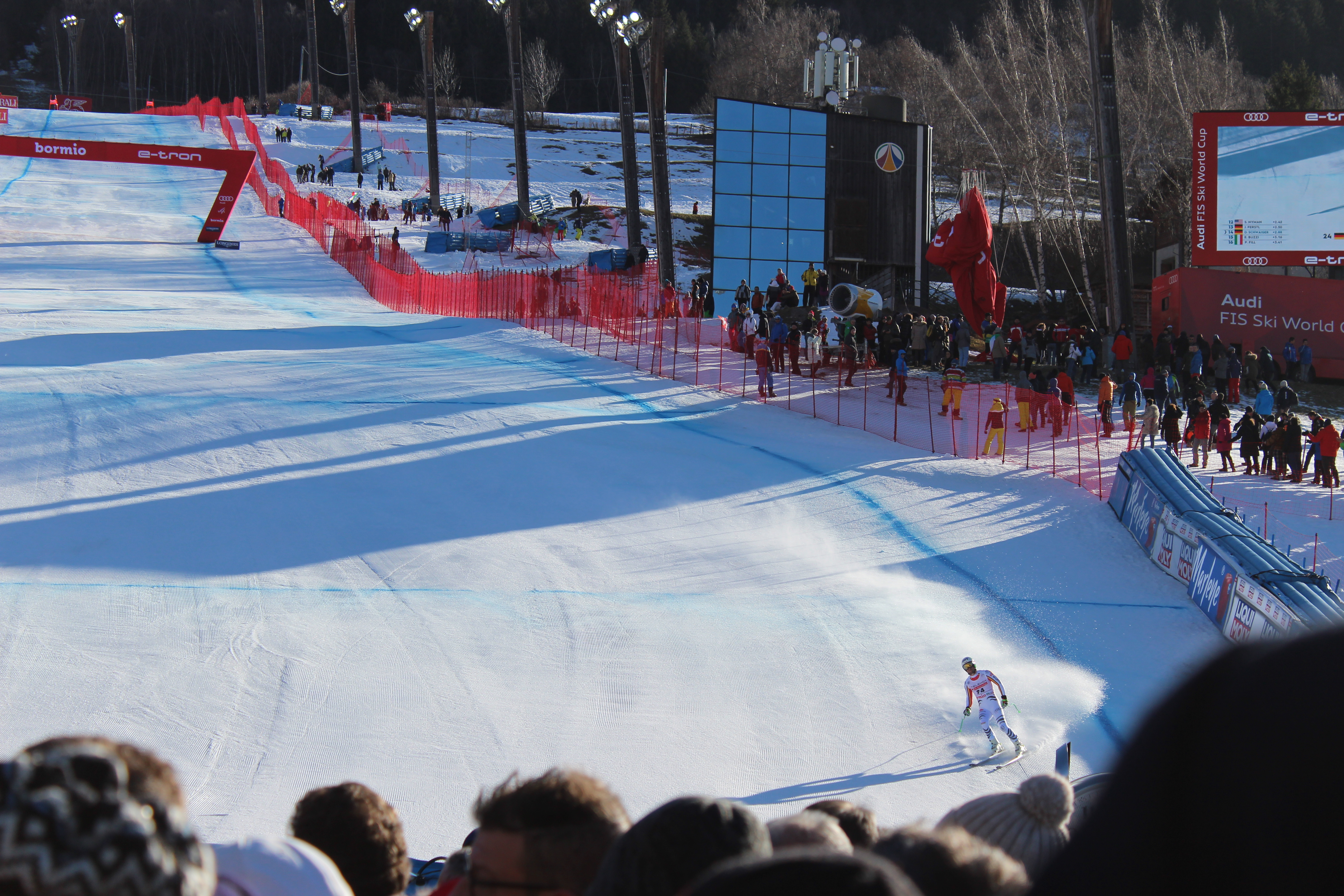

Personal information
- Born: 1 May 1991 (age 35)
- Height: 1.80 m (5 ft 11 in)

Skiing career
- Sport: Alpine skiing
- Club: WSV Koenigssee
- Disciplines: Super-G
- World Cup debut: 2 December 2006

World Championships
- Teams: 2 − (2019, 2021)
- Medals: 0

World Cup
- Seasons: 7 − (2014, 2016–21)
- Wins: 0
- Podiums: 0
- Overall titles: 0 – (88th in 2020)
- Discipline titles: 0 – (31st in DH, 2020)

Dominik Schwaiger (born 1 May 1991) is a German World Cup alpine ski racer, specializing in Super-G.

He participated in the FIS Alpine World Ski Championships 2019.

== World Championship results ==
Year	Age	Slalom	Giant slalom	Super-G	Downhill	Combined
2019	27	—	—	15	25	35
2021	29			DNF		
