= Olle Sundin =

Swedish alpine skier (born 1997)

Personal information
- Born: 17 December 1997 (age 28) Sweden

Skiing career
- Sport: Alpine skiing
- Disciplines: Downhill, super-G

World Championships
- Teams: 2 - (2019-2021)

World Cup
- Seasons: 3 - (2020-2022)
- Wins: 0
- Podiums: 0
- Overall titles: 0
- Discipline titles: 0

Olle Sundin (born 17 December 1997) is a retired Swedish World Cup alpine ski racer.

== World Cup results ==
=== Results per discipline ===
Discipline	WC starts	WC Top 30	WC Top 15	WC Top 5	WC Podium	Best result		
Discipline	WC starts	WC Top 30	WC Top 15	WC Top 5	WC Podium	Date	Location	Place
Slalom	0	0	0	0	0			
Giant slalom	0	0	0	0	0			
Super-G	0	0	0	0	0			
Downhill	2	0	0	0	0	7 March 2020	Kvitfjell, Norway	48th
Combined	1	0	0	0	0	17 January 2020	Wengen, Switzerland	DSQ2
Total	3	0	0	0	0			

- standings through 8 February 2021

== World Championship results ==
Year	Age	Slalom	Giant slalom	Super-G	Downhill	Combined
2019	21	–	–	34	34	30
2021	23			DNF	DNF	–

== Other results ==
=== European Cup results ===
==== Season standings ====
Season	Age	Overall	Slalom	Giant slalom	Super-G	Downhill	Combined
2018	20	200	—	—	—	—	4
2019	21	181	—	—	—	55	—
2020	22	51	—	—	34	29	6
2021	23	25	—	—	26	3	—

==== Results per discipline ====
Discipline	EC starts	EC Top 30	EC Top 15	EC Top 5	EC Podium	Best result		
Discipline	EC starts	EC Top 30	EC Top 15	EC Top 5	EC Podium	Date	Location	Place
Slalom	0	0	0	0	0			
Giant slalom	4	0	0	0	0	DNF1 4 times		
Super-G	24	5	3	0	0	18 January 2021	Zinal, Switzerland	9th
Downhill	20	11	4	2	1	15 December 2020	Santa Caterina, Italy	3rd
Combined	5	3	2	0	0	9 December 2019	Santa Caterina, Italy	6th
Total	53	19	9	2	1			

- Standings through 31 January 2021

==== Race podiums ====
- 1 podiums – (1 DH)

Season
Season	Date	Location	Discipline	Place
2021	15 December 2020	Santa Caterina, Italy	Downhill	3rd
