= Broderick Thompson (alpine skier) =

Canadian alpine skier (born 1994)

Personal information
- Nationality: Canadian
- Born: 19 April 1994 (age 32) Whistler, British Columbia
- Height: 184 cm (6 ft 0 in)
- Weight: 89 kg (196 lb)

Sport
- Country: Canada
- Sport: Alpine skiing
- Club: Whistler Mountain Ski Club

Broderick Thompson (born 19 April 1994 in North Vancouver) is a Canadian World Cup alpine ski racer. During the 2014–15 season, he was the Nor-Am Cup champion in super-G and scored his first World Cup point, finishing thirtieth in a combined event at Wengen.

Thompson competed in the 2018 Winter Olympics, and the 2021 World Championships. He is the brother of ski cross racer Marielle Thompson (b.1992).

Thompson scored his first World Cup podium on 2 December 2021, finishing 3rd. Thompson started the Beaver Creek, Colorado super-g with bib 35 and put down a time just under a second back from race winner Marco Odermatt from Switzerland.

In January 2022, Thompson was named to Canada's 2022 Olympic team.

== World Cup results ==
=== Season standings ===
Season	Age	Overall	Slalom	Giant Slalom	Super G	Downhill	Combined
2015	20	151	—	—	—	—	42
2016	21	146	—	—	—	—	42
2017	22	—	—	—	—	—	—
2018	23	76	—	—	—	45	10
2019	24	injured, did not compete					
2020	25	injured, did not compete					
2021	26	141	—	—	51	—	—N/a
2022	27	74	—	—	20	55	—N/a
2023	28	74	—	—	48	33	—N/a

Standings through 20 January 2023

=== Top twenty finishes ===
- 0 wins
- 1 podium (1 SG), 8 top twenties

Season	Date	Location	Discipline	Place
2018	29 Dec 2017	Bormio, Italy	Combined	8th
2018	12 Jan 2018	Wengen, Switzerland	Combined	17th
2022	2 Dec 2021	(United States) Beaver Creek, USA	Super-G	3rd
2022	3 Dec 2021	(United States) Beaver Creek, USA	Super-G	20th
2022	6 Mar 2022	Kvitfjell, Norway	Super-G	15th
2022	17 Mar 2022	Courchevel, France	Super-G	18th
2023	17 Dec 2022	Val Gardena, Italy	Downhill	16th
2023	20 Jan 2023	Kitzbühel, Austria	Downhill	9th

== World Championship results ==
Year	Age	Slalom	Giant slalom	Super-G	Downhill	Combined	Team event
2021	26	—	—	DNF	29	11	—

== Olympic results ==
Year	Age	Slalom	Giant slalom	Super-G	Downhill	Combined	Team event
2018	23	—	—	25	35	23	—
2022	27	—	—	DNF	DNF	8	—
