= Henrik Røa =

Norwegian alpine skier (born 1995)

Henrik Røa (born 5 August 1995) is a Norwegian alpine skier.

He competed in five events at the 2015 Junior World Championships, recording a 4th place in downhill. He was not selected for Norway national teams, and made a living as a part-time deliveryman for Foodora. He represents the club IL Heming.

Røa nonetheless made his World Cup debut in December 2019 in Val Gardena. Following several injuries in the Norwegian team, he was selected again in January 2021 in Kitzbühel, collecting his first World Cup points with a 16th place in downhill.
