= Brodie Seger =

Canadian alpine skier (born 1995)

Personal information
- Born: 28 December 1995 (age 30) North Vancouver, British Columbia, Canada

Skiing career
- Country: Canada
- Sport: Alpine skiing
- Club: Whistler Mountain Ski Club
- Disciplines: Super-G, Downhill
- World Cup debut: November 2017 (age 21)

Olympics
- Teams: 2 – (2022, 2026)
- Medals: 0

World Championships
- Teams: 3 – (2021–2025)
- Medals: 0

World Cup
- Seasons: 9 – (2018–2026)
- Podiums: 0
- Overall titles: 0 – (66th in 2023)
- Discipline titles: 0 – (23rd in DH, 2025)

Brodie Seger (born 28 December 1995) is a World Cup alpine ski racer from Canada, and specializes in the speed events of super-G and downhill. He made his World Cup debut in November 2017 at Lake Louise, Alberta.

At his first World Championships in 2021, Seger was fourth in the super-G at Cortina d'Ampezzo, Italy.

In January 2022, Seger was named to Canada's 2022 Olympic team.

== World Cup results ==
=== Season standings ===
Season
Season	Age	Overall	Slalom	Giant slalom	Super-G	Downhill	Combined
2019	23	127	—	—	—	46	—
2020	24	106	—	—	37	42	45
2021	25	112	—	—	44	52	—N/a
2022	26	94	—	—	32	44	—N/a
2023	27	66	—	—	24	39	—N/a
2024	28	131	—	—	56	53	—N/a
2025	29	74	—	—	45	23	—N/a
2026	30	90	—	—	32	48	—N/a

=== Top-ten finishes ===
- 0 podiums, 1 top ten (1 DH)

Season
Season	Date	Location	Discipline	Place
2025	6 December 2024	Beaver Creek, United States	Downhill	10th

== World Championship results ==
Year
Year	Age	Slalom	Giant slalom	Super-G	Downhill	Combined	Team combined	Parallel	Team event
2021	25	—	DNF1	4	DNF	—	—N/a	—	7
2023	27	—	—	9	DNF	DNS2	—N/a	—	—
2025	29	—	—	28	27	—N/a	17	—N/a	—

== Olympic results ==
Year
Year	Age	Slalom	Giant slalom	Super-G	Downhill	Combined	Team combined	Team event
2022	26	—	—	DNF	22	9	—N/a	—
2026	30	—	—	22	28	—N/a	—	—N/a
