= FIS Alpine World Ski Championships 2019 – Men's alpine combined =

Men's alpine combined at the FIS Alpine World Ski Championships 2019
- Venue: Åre ski resort
- Location: Åre, Sweden
- Dates: 11 February
- Competitors: 56 from 24 nations
- Winning time: 1:47.71

Medalists
gold medal	Alexis Pinturault	France
silver medal	Štefan Hadalin	Slovenia
bronze medal	Marco Schwarz	Austria

The Men's alpine combined competition at the FIS Alpine World Ski Championships 2019 was held on 11 February 2019.

== Results ==
The downhill was started at 12:00 and the slalom at 16:00.

Rank	Bib	Name	Country	Downhill	Rank	Slalom	Rank	Total	Diff
1st place, gold medalist(s)	7	Alexis Pinturault	France	1:08.79	24	38.92	2	1:47.71	
2nd place, silver medalist(s)	6	Štefan Hadalin	Slovenia	1:09.15	30	38.80	1	1:47.95	+0.24
3rd place, bronze medalist(s)	5	Marco Schwarz	Austria	1:08.52	21	39.65	4	1:48.17	+0.46
4	19	Riccardo Tonetti	Italy	1:08.29	16	40.09	6	1:48.38	+0.67
5	33	Linus Straßer	Germany	1:08.99	29	39.52	3	1:48.51	+0.80
6	9	Victor Muffat-Jeandet	France	1:08.76	23	39.76	5	1:48.52	+0.81
7	13	Mauro Caviezel	Switzerland	1:07.90	8	40.67	8	1:48.57	+0.86
8	20	Luca Aerni	Switzerland	1:08.50	20	40.23	7	1:48.73	+1.02
9	12	Dominik Paris	Italy	1:07.27	1	41.95	26	1:49.22	+1.51
10	29	Felix Monsén	Sweden	1:08.52	21	40.82	10	1:49.34	+1.63
11	8	Bryce Bennett	United States	1:08.31	18	41.28	13	1:49.59	+1.88
12	34	Daniel Danklmaier	Austria	1:08.08	12	41.52	15	1:49.60	+1.89
13	32	Rasmus Windingstad	Norway	1:08.42	19	41.26	12	1:49.68	+1.97
14	3	Romed Baumann	Austria	1:08.17	14	41.53	16	1:49.70	+1.99
15	26	Jan Zabystřan	Czech Republic	1:08.95	28	40.76	9	1:49.71	+2.00
16	44	Adrian Smiseth Sejersted	Norway	1:07.94	9	41.79	21	1:49.73	+2.02
17	10	Vincent Kriechmayr	Austria	1:07.71	4	42.12	32	1:49.83	+2.12
18	22	Ryan Cochran-Siegle	United States	1:07.30	2	42.54	36	1:49.84	+2.13
18	2	Carlo Janka	Switzerland	1:07.87	7	41.97	28	1:49.84	+2.13
20	21	Andreas Romar	Finland	1:08.17	14	41.74	19	1:49.91	+2.20
21	35	Alexander Köll	Sweden	1:08.01	11	41.92	25	1:49.93	+2.22
22	16	Aleksander Aamodt Kilde	Norway	1:07.65	3	42.34	34	1:49.99	+2.28
23	14	Niels Hintermann	Switzerland	1:08.16	13	41.85	23	1:50.01	+2.30
24	4	Klemen Kosi	Slovenia	1:08.30	17	41.80	22	1:50.10	+2.39
25	27	Maxence Muzaton	France	1:07.99	10	42.15	33	1:50.14	+2.43
26	28	Sandro Simonet	Switzerland	1:09.19	31	41.04	11	1:50.23	+2.52
27	30	Mattia Casse	Italy	1:07.79	6	42.78	37	1:50.57	+2.86
28	36	Ivan Kuznetsov	Russia	1:08.90	27	41.78	20	1:50.68	+2.97
29	40	Jeffrey Read	Canada	1:08.80	25	41.96	27	1:50.76	+3.05
30	48	Olle Sundin	Sweden	1:09.28	33	41.60	17	1:50.88	+3.17
30	11	Pavel Trikhichev	Russia	1:09.45	38	41.43	14	1:50.88	+3.17
32	1	Thomas Mermillod-Blondin	France	1:09.39	36	41.85	23	1:51.24	+3.53
33	31	Miha Hrobat	Slovenia	1:09.32	34	42.05	30	1:51.37	+3.66
34	25	Sebastian Foss-Solevåg	Norway	1:09.45	38	42.02	29	1:51.47	+3.76
35	41	Dominik Schwaiger	Germany	1:09.25	32	42.38	35	1:51.63	+3.92
36	23	Ondřej Berndt	Czech Republic	1:10.01	44	42.08	31	1:52.09	+4.38
37	42	Brodie Seger	Canada	1:09.33	35	43.08	39	1:52.41	+4.70
38	47	Zack Monsén	Sweden	1:10.05	45	42.95	38	1:53.00	+5.29
39	38	Natko Zrnčić-Dim	Croatia	1:09.98	43	43.20	40	1:53.18	+5.47
40	18	Filip Zubčić	Croatia	1:11.70	49	41.73	18	1:53.43	+5.72
41	51	Simon Breitfuss Kammerlander	Bolivia	1:10.09	46	44.70	42	1:54.79	+7.08
42	53	Yuri Danilochkin	Belarus	1:11.00	48	45.20	43	1:56.20	+8.49
43	54	Elvis Opmanis	Latvia	1:12.74	53	44.49	41	1:57.23	+9.52
—	17	Christof Innerhofer	Italy	1:07.71	4	Did not finish			
—	24	Boštjan Kline	Slovenia	1:08.86	26	Did not finish			
—	37	Marko Vukićević	Serbia	1:09.67	40	Did not finish			
—	56	Martin Bendík	Slovakia	1:09.81	41	Did not finish			
—	45	Matej Prieložný	Slovakia	1:10.25	47	Did not finish			
—	50	Ivan Kovbasnyuk	Ukraine	1:11.72	50	Did not finish			
—	46	Sven von Appen	Chile	1:11.92	51	Did not finish			
—	55	Albin Tahiri	KOS	1:12.02	52	Did not finish			
—	49	Christoffer Faarup	Denmark	1:09.41	37	Did not start			
—	15	Ted Ligety	United States	1:09.84	42	Did not start			
—	39	Jack Gower	Great Britain	Did not finish					
—	43	Henrik von Appen	Chile	Did not finish					
—	52	Tomáš Klinský	Czech Republic	Did not finish					
