= FIS Alpine World Ski Championships 2021 – Men's downhill =

Men's downhill at the FIS Alpine World Ski Championships 2021
- Location: Cortina d'Ampezzo, Italy
- Date: 14 February
- Competitors: 42 from 17 nations
- Winning time: 1:37.79

Medalists
gold medal	Vincent Kriechmayr	Austria
silver medal	Andreas Sander	Germany
bronze medal	Beat Feuz	Switzerland

Men's Downhill
- Location: Vertigine (vertigo); Cortina d'Ampezzo, Italy
- Vertical: 840 m (2,756 ft)
- Top elevation: 2,400 m (7,874 ft)
- Base elevation: 1,560 m (5,118 ft)
- Longest run: 2.610 km (1.62 mi)

The Men's downhill competition at the FIS Alpine World Ski Championships 2021 was held on 14 February 2021.

Austria's Vincent Kriechmayr won the gold medal, Andreas Sander of Germany took the silver, and the bronze medalist was Beat Feuz of Switzerland.

The race course was 2.610 km (1.62 mi) in length, with a vertical drop of 840 m (2,756 ft) from a starting elevation of 2,400 m (7,874 ft) above sea level. Kriechmayr's winning time of 97.79 seconds yielded an average speed of 96.083 km/h (59.7 mph) and an average vertical descent rate of 8.590 m/s (28.2 ft/s).

== Results ==
The race started at 11:00 CET (UTC+1) under clear skies. The air temperature was −12 °C (10 °F) at the starting gate and −10 °C (14 °F) at the finish.

Rank	Bib	Name	Country	Time	Diff
1st place, gold medalist(s)	1	Vincent Kriechmayr	Austria	1:37.79	—
2nd place, silver medalist(s)	2	Andreas Sander	Germany	1:37.80	+0.01
3rd place, bronze medalist(s)	7	Beat Feuz	Switzerland	1:37.97	+0.18
4	3	Dominik Paris	Italy	1:38.44	+0.65
4	18	Marco Odermatt	Switzerland	1:38.44	+0.65
6	15	Christof Innerhofer	Italy	1:38.69	+0.90
7	12	Nils Allègre	France	1:38.76	+0.97
8	17	Kjetil Jansrud	Norway	1:38.81	+1.02
9	11	Carlo Janka	Switzerland	1:38.87	+1.08
10	4	Bryce Bennett	United States	1:38.89	+1.10
10	21	Henrik Røa	Norway	1:38.89	+1.10
12	14	Travis Ganong	United States	1:39.03	+1.24
13	10	Max Franz	Austria	1:39.04	+1.25
14	13	Romed Baumann	Germany	1:39.09	+1.30
15	22	Boštjan Kline	Slovenia	1:39.24	+1.45
16	9	Johan Clarey	France	1:39.29	+1.50
17	23	Felix Monsén	Sweden	1:39.31	+1.52
18	6	Thomas Dreßen	Germany	1:39.47	+1.68
19	19	Otmar Striedinger	Austria	1:39.63	+1.84
20	16	Jared Goldberg	United States	1:39.74	+1.95
21	29	James Crawford	Canada	1:39.78	+1.99
22	26	Dominik Schwaiger	Germany	1:39.90	+2.11
23	31	Miha Hrobat	Slovenia	1:39.99	+2.20
24	24	Matteo Marsaglia	Italy	1:40.18	+2.39
25	20	Matthieu Bailet	France	1:40.22	+2.43
26	25	Jeffrey Read	Canada	1:40.34	+2.55
27	36	Marco Pfiffner	Liechtenstein	1:41.05	+3.26
28	38	Arnaud Alessandria	Monaco	1:41.57	+3.78
29	32	Broderick Thompson	Canada	1:41.96	+4.17
30	40	Barnabás Szőllős	Israel	1:42.46	+4.67
31	37	Martin Bendík	Slovakia	1:43.02	+5.23
32	41	Juan Pablo Vallecillo	Argentina	1:43.48	+5.69
33	39	Marcus Vorre	Denmark	1:45.17	+7.38
34	42	Benjamin Szőllős	Israel	1:49.71	+11.92
	5	Matthias Mayer	Austria	Did not finish	
	8	Maxence Muzaton	France	Did not finish	
	27	Brodie Seger	Canada	Did not finish	
	28	Florian Schieder	Italy	Did not finish	
	30	Niels Hintermann	Switzerland	Did not finish	
	33	Olle Sundin	Sweden	Did not finish	
	34	Adur Etxezarreta	Spain	Did not finish	
	35	Nejc Naraločnik	Slovenia	Did not finish	
