= Jack Gower =

Irish and British alpine ski racer (born 1994)

Personal information
- Born: 26 May 1994 (age 32) Chichester

Skiing career
- Sport: Alpine skiing
- Club: Spsrc
- Disciplines: Downhill, super-G, combined
World Cup debut
25 November 2017 (age 23)

World Championships
- Teams: 1
- Medals: 0

World Cup
- Seasons: 1st – (2017/18–)

Jack Gower (born 26 May 1994) is an Irish and British alpine ski racer. He competed for the UK at the 2015 World Championships in Beaver Creek, USA, in the giant slalom. Gower competed for Ireland at the 2022 Winter Olympics. Jack Gower is the son of famous Welsh Rally driver Richard Gower.

== Career ==
At the FIS Alpine World Ski Championships 2015 in Beaver Creek, Gower finished 38th in the Giant slalom. Gower made his World Cup debut on 25 November 2017 in the Lake Louise downhill, he finished 67th. On 2 January 2022, it was announced that Gower would start for Ireland in the future. As one of his grandmothers comes from Skibbereen in West Cork, a change of nation was possible.

At the 2022 Winter Olympics in Beijing, Gower competed for Ireland. He finished 12th in the combined event, 31st in downhill and 25th in giant slalom.

== World Championship results ==
Year	Age	Slalom	Giant slalom	Super-G	Downhill	Combined
2015	20	—	38	—	—	—
