= FIS Alpine World Ski Championships 2021 – Men's alpine combined =

Men's alpine combined at the FIS Alpine World Ski Championships 2021
- Location: Cortina d'Ampezzo, Italy
- Date: 15 February
- Competitors: 44 from 22 nations
- Winning time: 2:05.86

Medalists
gold medal	Marco Schwarz	Austria
silver medal	Alexis Pinturault	France
bronze medal	Loïc Meillard	Switzerland

Men's Combined (Super-G)
- Location: Olimpia delle Tofane; Cortina d'Ampezzo, Italy
- Vertical: 600 m (1,969 ft)
- Top elevation: 2,160 m (7,087 ft)
- Base elevation: 1,560 m (5,118 ft)
- Longest run: 2.150 km (1.34 mi)

Men's Combined (Slalom)
- Location: Olimpia delle Tofane; Cortina d'Ampezzo, Italy
- Vertical: 180 m (591 ft)
- Top elevation: 1,740 m (5,709 ft)
- Base elevation: 1,560 m (5,118 ft)

The Men's alpine combined competition at the FIS Alpine World Ski Championships 2021 was scheduled for 10 February, but was postponed to 15 February 2021.

== Results ==
The super-G was started at 11:15, and the slalom at 15:20.

Rank	Bib	Name	Country	Super-G	Rank	Slalom	Rank	Total	Diff
1st place, gold medalist(s)	14	Marco Schwarz	Austria	1:20.35	5	45.51	1	2:05.86	—
2nd place, silver medalist(s)	5	Alexis Pinturault	France	1:20.03	2	45.87	2	2:05.90	+0.04
3rd place, bronze medalist(s)	1	Loïc Meillard	Switzerland	1:20.38	6	46.60	3	2:06.98	+1.12
4	32	James Crawford	Canada	1:19.95	1	47.24	5	2:07.19	+1.33
5	21	Simon Jocher	Germany	1:20.61	9	47.71	6	2:08.32	+2.46
6	9	Victor Muffat-Jeandet	France	1:21.95	24	47.10	4	2:09.05	+3.19
7	3	Riccardo Tonetti	Italy	1:20.64	10	48.75	12	2:09.39	+3.53
8	15	Justin Murisier	Switzerland	1:21.59	20	47.95	9	2:09.54	+3.68
9	20	Jan Zabystřan	Czech Republic	1:21.59	20	48.10	10	2:09.69	+3.83
10	30	Trevor Philp	Canada	1:20.95	11	48.77	13	2:09.72	+3.86
11	24	Broderick Thompson	Canada	1:21.25	14	48.85	14	2:10.10	+4.24
12	25	Albert Ortega	Spain	1:22.27	30	48.73	11	2:11.00	+5.14
13	33	Barnabás Szőllős	Israel	1:23.21	32	47.93	8	2:11.14	+5.28
14	16	Christof Innerhofer	Italy	1:21.79	22	49.71	15	2:11.50	+5.64
15	36	Armand Marchant	Belgium	1:24.09	33	47.76	7	2:11.85	+5.99
16	10	Bryce Bennett	United States	1:21.11	13	51.12	18	2:12.23	+6.37
17	31	Nejc Naraločnik	Slovenia	1:22.09	28	50.81	17	2:12.90	+7.04
18	39	Cristian Javier Simari Birkner	Argentina	1:24.77	35	50.03	16	2:14.80	+8.94
19	27	Henrik Røa	Norway	1:22.86	31	52.01	19	2:14.87	+9.01
20	40	Juan Pablo Vallecillo	Argentina	1:25.07	36	52.53	21	2:17.60	+11.74
21	35	Benjamin Szőllős	Israel	1:26.40	39	52.28	20	2:18.68	+12.82
22	26	Jeffrey Read	Canada	1:21.27	15	1:04.27	22	2:25.54	+19.68
23	29	Giovanni Franzoni	Italy	1:21.42	18	1:07.46	23	2:28.88	+23.02
	13	Vincent Kriechmayr	Austria	1:20.25	3	did not finish			
	7	Matthias Mayer	Austria	1:20.27	4	did not finish			
	12	Luca Aerni	Switzerland	1:20.48	7	did not finish			
	6	Gino Caviezel	Switzerland	1:20.51	8	did not finish			
	18	Miha Hrobat	Slovenia	1:21.40	16	did not finish			
	19	Martin Čater	Slovenia	1:21.46	19	did not finish			
	23	Olle Sundin	Sweden	1:21.94	23	did not finish			
	22	Felix Monsén	Sweden	1:21.97	25	did not finish			
	28	Willis Feasey	New Zealand	1:21.98	26	did not finish			
	44	Juhan Luik	Estonia	1:25.25	37	did not finish			
	43	Ivan Kovbasnyuk	Ukraine	1:26.19	38	did not finish			
	38	Boštjan Kline	Slovenia	1:21.41	17	disqualified			
	11	Kjetil Jansrud	Norway	1:20.95	11	did not start			
	17	Nils Allègre	France	1:22.04	27	did not start			
	2	Jared Goldberg	United States	1:22.21	29	did not start			
	42	Arnaud Alessandria	Monaco	1:24.20	34	did not start			
	4	Mattias Rönngren	Sweden	did not finish					
	8	Marco Pfiffner	Liechtenstein	did not finish					
	34	Ondřej Berndt	Czech Republic	did not finish					
	37	Martin Bendík	Slovakia	did not finish					
	41	Marcus Vorre	Denmark	did not finish					
