= Andreas Romar =

Finnish alpine skier

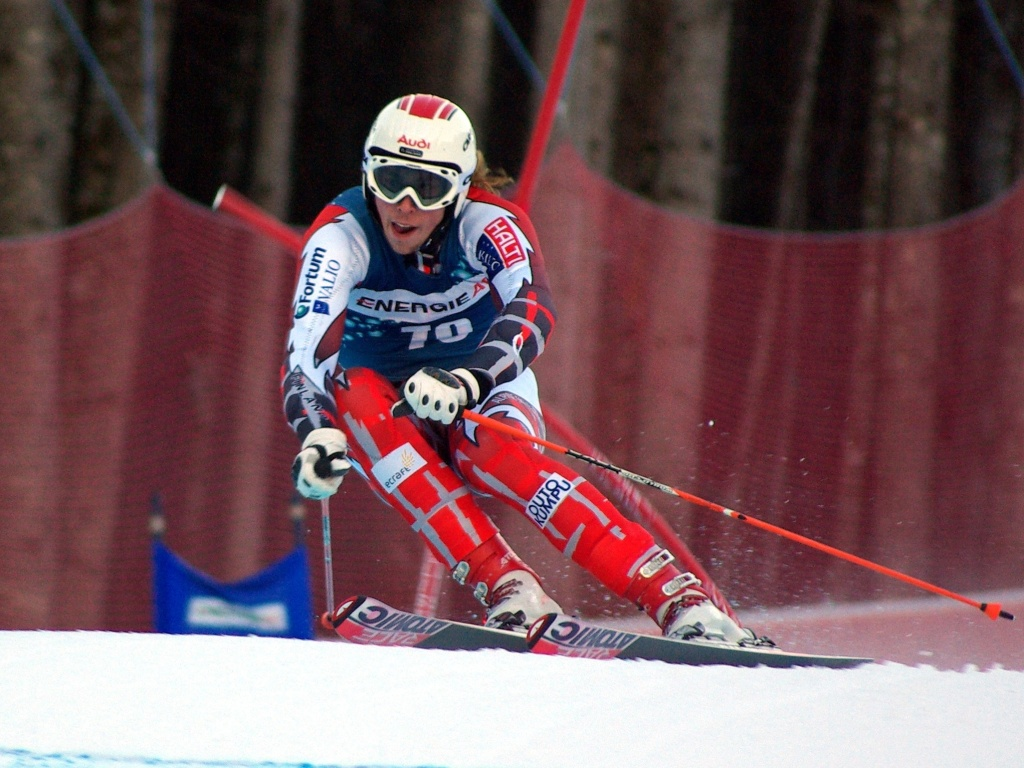
- Andreas Romar in January 2008

Personal information
- Nationality: Finnish
- Born: 4 September 1989 (age 37)

Sport
- Sport: Alpine skiing

Andreas Romar (born 4 September 1989 in Korsholm, Ostrobothnia) is a Finnish alpine skier. He represented Finland at the 2010 Winter Olympics in Vancouver.

== World Cup Results ==
Downhill
Year	1	2	3	4	5	6	7	8	9	10	Fin.	Pos	Points
2010-11	LAK; 52	VGA -	BOR -	WEN; 35	KIT -	CHA; 21	KVI; 41	KVI; 27			LEN -	46th	14
2011-12	LAK; 19	BEA; 37	BOR -	WEN; 36	KIT; 43	GAR; DNF	CHA; 35	CHA; 23	SOC; 17	KVI; 27	SCH -	36th	38
2012-13	LAK; 16	BEA; 30	VGA; 31	BOR; 14	WEN; 25	KIT; 31	GAR; 21	KVI; 25			LEN -	32nd	56
2013-14	LAK; DNS	BEA -	VGA -	BOR -	WEN -	KIT -	KVI -	KVI -			LEN -	-	0
2014-15	LAK; 57	BEA; DNF	VGA -	SAN -	WEN -	KIT -	SAA; 31	GAR -	KVI -		MÉR -	-	0
2015-16	LAK; 52	BEA; 41	VGA -	SAN; 34	WEN; 40	KIT; DNS	GAR; 19	JEO; 43	CHA; 31	KVI -	STM -	46th	12
2016-17	ISE -	VGA; 54	KIT; 32	GAR -	GAR -	KVI; 45	KVI; 32				ASP -	–	0
2017-18	LAK; 31	BEA; 26	VGA; 46	BOR; 54	WEN; 41	KIT; 27	GAR; DNF	KVI; 45			ÅRE -	50th	9

Super-G
Year	1	2	3	4	5	6	7	Fin.	Pos	Points
2010-11	LAK; DNF	BEA; DNF	VGA -	KIT -	HIN; 33	KVI; 18		LEN -	41st	13
2011-12	LAK; 36	BEA; 22	VGA; 7	CRA; DNF	CRA; 15	KVI; 12	KVI; 7	SCH; 13	15th	139
2012-13	LAK; 7	BEA; 40	VGA; 21	KIT; 19	KVI; DNF			LEN -	19th	58
2014-15	LAK; DNF	BEA; DNF	VGA -	KIT -	SAA -	KVI -		MÉR -	-	0
2015-16	LAK; 53	BEA; 48	VGA -	KIT; 39	JEO; 28	HIN -	KVI -	STM -	56th	3
2016-17	ISE -	VGA; 60	SAN; 55	KIT; 44	KVI; 35			ASP -	-	0
2017-18	LAK; 49	BEA; DNF	VGA; DNS	KIT; 41	KVI; 47			ÅRE -	–	0

Giant Slalom
Year	1	2	3	4	5	6	7	8	Fin.	Pos	Points
2009-10	SÖL; DNF1	BEA -	ISE -	ALT; DNF1	KRA; DNQ	KRA; DNF1			GAR -	-	0
2010-11	BEA; DNQ	ISE -	ALT -	ADE -	HIN -	KRA -			LEN -	-	0
2011-12	SÖL; DNQ	BEA; DNF1	BEA -	ALT; DNQ	ADE; DNF1	BAN -	CRA; DNF1	KRA -	SCH -	-	0
2012-13	SÖL; DNQ	BEA; DNQ	ISE -	ALT -	ADE -	GAR -	KRA -		LEN -	–	0

Slalom
Year	1	2	3	4	5	6	7	8	9	10	Fin.	Pos	Points
2006-07	LEV -	BEA -	ALT -	ADE -	KIT -	KIT; DNQ	SCH -	GAR -	KRA -		LEN -	–	0
2008-09	LEV; DNF1	ALT; DNF1	ZAG; DNQ	ADE -	WEN; DNS1	KIT -	SCH -	GAR -	KRA -		ÅRE -	–	0
2009-10	LEV; DNQ	ALT; DNF1	ZAG; DNF1	ADE; DNF1	WEN -	KIT -	SCH -	KRA -			GAR -	–	0
2011-12	BEA -	ALT -	FLA -	ZAG -	ADE -	WEN -	KIT; DNQ	SCH -	BAN -	KRA -	SCH -	–	0

Alpine Combined / Super Combined
Year	1	2	3	4	Pos	Points
2010-11	WEN; 17	KIT -	CHA; 15	BAN -	27th	30
2011-12	WEN; DNF1	KIT; 12	CHA; 16	SOC; 10	15th	63
2012-13	WEN; 11	KIT; 8			7th	56
2015-16	WEN; 27	KIT; DNF2	CHA; 48		44th	4
2016-17	SAN; 33	WEN; 16			28th	15
2017-18	BOR; DNF2	WEN; 25			35th	6
