= FIS Alpine World Ski Championships 2019 – Men's super-G =

Men's super-G at the FIS Alpine World Ski Championships 2019
- Venue: Åre ski resort
- Location: Åre, Sweden
- Dates: 6 February
- Competitors: 70 from 33 nations
- Winning time: 1:24.20

Medalists
| gold medal | Dominik Paris | Italy |
| silver medal | Johan Clarey | France |
| silver medal | Vincent Kriechmayr | Austria |

Men's Super-G
- Location: Åre, Sweden
- Vertical: 637 m (2,090 ft)
- Top elevation: 1,033 m (3,389 ft)
- Base elevation: 396 m (1,299 ft)

The Men's super-G competition at the FIS Alpine World Ski Championships 2019 was held on 6 February.

== Results ==
The race was started at 12:30.

| Rank | Bib | Name | Country | Time | Diff |
|---|---|---|---|---|---|
| 1st place, gold medalist(s) | 3 | Dominik Paris | Italy | 1:24.20 | |
| 2nd place, silver medalist(s) | 14 | Johan Clarey | France | 1:24.29 | +0.09 |
| 2nd place, silver medalist(s) | 9 | Vincent Kriechmayr | Austria | 1:24.29 | +0.09 |
| 4 | 18 | Christof Innerhofer | Italy | 1:24.55 | +0.35 |
| 5 | 20 | Adrien Théaux | France | 1:24.57 | +0.37 |
| 6 | 15 | Josef Ferstl | Germany | 1:24.59 | +0.39 |
| 7 | 4 | Brice Roger | France | 1:24.61 | +0.41 |
| 8 | 30 | Mattia Casse | Italy | 1:24.70 | +0.50 |
| 8 | 23 | Steven Nyman | United States | 1:24.70 | +0.50 |
| 8 | 8 | Adrian Smiseth Sejersted | Norway | 1:24.70 | +0.50 |
| 11 | 24 | Ryan Cochran-Siegle | United States | 1:24.73 | +0.53 |
| 12 | 16 | Marco Odermatt | Switzerland | 1:24.78 | +0.58 |
| 13 | 28 | Martin Čater | Slovenia | 1:24.79 | +0.59 |
| 14 | 25 | Nils Allègre | France | 1:24.84 | +0.64 |
| 15 | 21 | Dominik Schwaiger | Germany | 1:24.87 | +0.67 |
| 16 | 11 | Aksel Lund Svindal | Norway | 1:25.12 | +0.92 |
| 17 | 27 | Benjamin Thomsen | Canada | 1:25.13 | +0.93 |
| 18 | 1 | Beat Feuz | Switzerland | 1:25.20 | +1.00 |
| 19 | 37 | Felix Monsén | Sweden | 1:25.25 | +1.05 |
| 20 | 36 | Alexander Köll | Sweden | 1:25.28 | +1.08 |
| 20 | 29 | Daniel Danklmaier | Austria | 1.25.28 | +1.08 |
| 22 | 7 | Kjetil Jansrud | Norway | 1:25.38 | +1.18 |
| 23 | 50 | Bryce Bennett | United States | 1:25.82 | +1.62 |
| 24 | 5 | Aleksander Aamodt Kilde | Norway | 1:25.83 | +1.63 |
| 25 | 45 | Mattias Rönngren | Sweden | 1:25.98 | +1.78 |
| 26 | 39 | Christoffer Faarup | Denmark | 1:26.01 | +1.81 |
| 27 | 34 | Brodie Seger | Canada | 1:26.05 | +1.85 |
| 28 | 40 | Henrik von Appen | Chile | 1:26.16 | +1.96 |
| 29 | 42 | Filip Zubčić | Croatia | 1:26.28 | +2.08 |
| 30 | 43 | Natko Zrnčić-Dim | Croatia | 1:26.37 | +2.17 |
| 31 | 47 | Ivan Kuznetsov | Russia | 1:26.39 | +2.19 |
| 31 | 38 | Maarten Meiners | Netherlands | 1:26.39 | +2.19 |
| 33 | 57 | Pavel Trikhichev | Russia | 1:26.99 | +2.79 |
| 34 | 58 | Olle Sundin | Sweden | 1:27.15 | +2.95 |
| 35 | 46 | Marc Oliveras | Andorra | 1:27.69 | +3.49 |
| 36 | 59 | Arnaud Alessandria | Monaco | 1:28.06 | +3.86 |
| 37 | 31 | James Crawford | Canada | 1:28.13 | +3.93 |
| 38 | 54 | Harry Laidlaw | Australia | 1:28.27 | +4.27 |
| 39 | 53 | Martin Bendík | Slovakia | 1:28.47 | +4.39 |
| 40 | 60 | Tomáš Klinský | Czech Republic | 1:28.59 | +4.07 |
| 41 | 56 | Simon Breitfuss Kammerlander | Bolivia | 1:28.68 | +4.48 |
| 42 | 55 | Kryštof Krýzl | Czech Republic | 1:29.22 | +5.02 |
| 43 | 32 | Jack Gower | Great Britain | 1:29.58 | +5.38 |
| 44 | 61 | Sven von Appen | Chile | 1:30.12 | +5.92 |
| 45 | 26 | Matteo Marsaglia | Italy | 1:30.94 | +6.74 |
| 46 | 65 | Elvis Opmanis | Latvia | 1:31.34 | +7.14 |
| 47 | 68 | Albin Tahiri | Kosovo | 1:31.72 | +7.52 |
| 48 | 67 | Yuri Danilochkin | Belarus | 1:32.98 | +8.78 |
| 49 | 66 | Andrej Drukarov | Lithuania | 1:33.33 | +9.13 |
| 50 | 63 | Ivan Kovbasnyuk | Ukraine | 1:33.61 | +9.41 |
| 51 | 69 | Sergey Danov | Kazakhstan | 1:35.66 | +11.46 |
| — | 2 | Thomas Tumler | Switzerland | Did not finish | |
| — | 6 | Boštjan Kline | Slovenia | Did not finish | |
| — | 10 | Dustin Cook | Canada | Did not finish | |
| — | 12 | Travis Ganong | United States | Did not finish | |
| — | 13 | Matthias Mayer | Austria | Did not finish | |
| — | 17 | Mauro Caviezel | Switzerland | Did not finish | |
| — | 19 | Hannes Reichelt | Austria | Did not finish | |
| — | 22 | Klemen Kosi | Slovenia | Did not finish | |
| — | 33 | Miha Hrobat | Slovenia | Did not finish | |
| — | 35 | Marko Vukićević | Serbia | Did not finish | |
| — | 41 | Manuel Schmid | Germany | Did not finish | |
| — | 44 | Ian Gut | Liechtenstein | Did not finish | |
| — | 48 | Matej Prieložný | Slovakia | Did not finish | |
| — | 49 | Ondřej Berndt | Czech Republic | Did not finish | |
| — | 51 | Andreas Romar | Finland | Did not finish | |
| — | 52 | Jan Zabystřan | Czech Republic | Did not finish | |
| — | 62 | Adur Etxezarreta | Spain | Did not finish | |
| — | 64 | Ioan Valeriu Achiriloaie | Romania | Did not finish | |
| — | 70 | Uladzislau Chertsin | Belarus | Did not finish | |
