= Ondřej Berndt =

Czech alpine skier (born 1988)

Personal information
- Nationality: Czech
- Born: 29 September 1988 (age 36); Jablonec nad Nisou, Czechoslovakia

Sport
- Sport: Alpine skiing

Ondřej Berndt (born 29 September 1988) is a Czech alpine skier. He competed in the 2018 Winter Olympics. He also participated in the World Championships in 2013, 2017, 2019 and 2021, where he achieved his best performance in the world with a 17th place in the slalom.
