= Martin Bendík =

Slovak alpine skier (born 1993)

Martin Bendík OLY
Personal information
- Born: 27 April 1993 (age 33) Poprad, Slovakia
- Height: 1.87 m (6 ft 2 in) (6' 2'')

Skiing career
- Sport: Alpine skiing

Olympics
- Teams: 0
- Medals: 0

World Championships
- Teams: 1 – (2021)
- Medals: 0

Martin Bendík (born 27 April 1993) is an alpine skier from Slovakia. He competed for Slovakia at the 2014 Winter Olympics in the alpine skiing events.
