= FIS Alpine World Ski Championships 2019 – Men's slalom =

Men's slalom at the FIS Alpine World Ski Championships 2019
- Venue: Åre ski resort
- Location: Åre, Sweden
- Dates: 17 February
- Competitors: 99 from 52 nations
- Winning time: 2:05.86

Medalists
gold medal	Marcel Hirscher	Austria
silver medal	Michael Matt	Austria
bronze medal	Marco Schwarz	Austria

The Men's slalom competition at the FIS Alpine World Ski Championships 2019 was held on 17 February 2019. A qualification was held on 16 February 2019.

== Results ==
=== Final ===
Run 1 was started at 11:00 and the final run at 14:30.

Rank	Bib	Name	Nation	Run 1	Rank	Run 2	Rank	Total	Diff
1st place, gold medalist(s)	3	Marcel Hirscher	Austria	1:00.60	1	1:05.26	25	2:05.86	
2nd place, silver medalist(s)	5	Michael Matt	Austria	1:01.95	4	1:04.56	13	2:06.51	+0.65
3rd place, bronze medalist(s)	6	Marco Schwarz	Austria	1:01.82	3	1:04.80	19	2:06.62	+0.76
4	4	Alexis Pinturault	France	1:01.16	2	1:05.63	26	2:06.79	+0.93
5	9	Ramon Zenhäusern	Switzerland	1:02.92	12	1:03.90	5	2:06.82	+0.96
6	8	Manuel Feller	Austria	1:01.98	5	1:04.92	21	2:06.90	+1.04
7	1	Clément Noël	France	1:02.78	8	1:04.17	6	2:06.95	+1.09
8	2	Henrik Kristoffersen	Norway	1:02.30	6	1:04.68	16	2:06.98	+1.12
9	14	Dave Ryding	Great Britain	1:03.72	20	1:03.31	3	2:07.03	+1.17
10	18	Stefano Gross	Italy	1:02.96	13	1:04.37	10	2:07.33	+1.47
11	15	Christian Hirschbühl	Austria	1:02.82	9	1:04.54	12	2:07.36	+1.50
12	17	Sebastian Foss-Solevåg	Norway	1:03.32	15	1:04.21	7	2:07.53	+1.67
13	10	André Myhrer	Sweden	1:02.88	10	1:04.67	15	2:07.55	+1.69
14	13	Loïc Meillard	Switzerland	1:02.67	7	1:05.13	23	2:07.80	+1.94
15	30	Alexandr Khoroshilov	Russia	1:03.56	16	1:04.29	8	2:07.85	+1.99
16	16	Victor Muffat-Jeandet	France	1:03.67	19	1:04.42	11	2:08.09	+2.23
17	46	Žan Kranjec	Slovenia	1:05.00	26	1:03.14	2	2:08.14	+2.28
18	12	Manfred Mölgg	Italy	1:03.62	17	1:04.63	14	2:08.25	+2.39
19	34	Alex Vinatzer	Italy	1:05.21	28	1:03.10	1	2:08.31	+2.45
20	28	Mattias Hargin	Sweden	1:04.96	25	1:03.43	4	2:08.39	+2.53
21	23	Elias Kolega	Croatia	1:04.07	22	1:04.35	9	2:08.42	+2.56
22	22	Giuliano Razzoli	Italy	1:03.25	14	1:05.20	24	2:08.45	+2.59
23	26	Jonathan Nordbotten	Norway	1:04.62	24	1:04.74	17	2:09.36	+3.50
24	33	Simon Fournier	Canada	1:04.49	23	1:04.93	22	2:09.42	+3.56
25	51	Anton Tremmel	Germany	1:05.04	27	1:04.74	17	2:09.78	+3.92
26	45	Filip Zubčić	Croatia	1:05.24	30	1:04.87	20	2:10.11	+4.25
27	42	Juan Del Campo	Spain	1:05.23	29	1:05.77	27	2:11.00	+5.14
28	32	Linus Straßer	Germany	1:05.58	32	1:06.03	28	2:11.61	+5.75
29	37	Tanguy Nef	Switzerland	1:05.30	31	1:06.34	29	2:11.64	+5.78
30	49	Jens Henttinen	Finland	1:05.93	36	1:06.53	30	2:12.46	+6.60
31	47	Pavel Trikhichev	Russia	1:05.68	34	1:06.83	31	2:12.51	+6.65
32	29	Matej Vidović	Croatia	1:05.86	35	1:07.74	32	2:13.60	+7.74
33	54	Jakob Špik	Slovenia	1:05.67	33	1:09.39	36	2:15.06	+9.20
34	44	Matej Falat	Slovakia	1:06.70	37	1:09.02	35	2:15.72	+9.86
35	76	Alec Scott	Australia	1:09.61	48	1:08.40	33	2:18.01	+12.15
36	64	Max van Rossum	Netherlands	1:09.54	47	1:08.74	34	2:18.28	+12.42
37	56	Zak Vinter	Great Britain	1:09.21	46	1:10.96	37	2:19.27	+13.41
38	67	Miks Zvejnieks	Latvia	1:08.34	40	1:11.67	39	2:20.01	+14.15
39	80	Itamar Biran	Israel	1:09.05	44	1:11.07	38	2:20.12	+14.26
40	25	Leif Kristian Nestvold-Haugen	Norway	1:03.62	17	1:17.40	45	2:21.02	+15.16
41	55	Alex Puente Tasias	Spain	1:07.38	38	1:15.80	43	2:23.18	+17.32
42	83	Cormac Comerford	Ireland	1:11.98	49	1:13.08	40	2:25.06	+19.20
43	86	Andrej Drukarov	Lithuania	1:12.88	50	1:13.13	41	2:26.01	+20.15
44	89	Michael Poettoz	Colombia	1:13.67	51	1:14.64	42	2:28.31	+22.45
45	78	Alexandru Barbu	Romania	1:15.02	53	1:16.48	44	2:31.50	+25.64
46	93	Erjon Tola	Albania	1:16.71	55	1:17.93	46	2:34.64	+28.78
47	94	Yianno Kouyoumdjian	Cyprus	1:18.97	56	1:19.93	47	2:38.90	+33.04
48	100	Ricardo Brancal	Portugal	1:33.06	57	1:31.60	48	3:04.66	+58.80
—	27	Dominik Stehle	Germany	1:03.91	21	did not finish			
—	82	Yoan Todorov	Bulgaria	1:08.48	41	did not finish			
—	66	Axel Esteve	Andorra	1:08.68	42	did not finish			
—	60	Billy Major	Great Britain	1:08.87	43	did not finish			
—	77	Daniel Paulus	Czech Republic	1:09.05	44	did not finish			
—	96	Zakhar Kuchin	Kazakhstan	1:16.69	54	did not finish			
—	11	Felix Neureuther	Germany	1:02.89	11	disqualified			
—	19	Štefan Hadalin	Slovenia	1:08.08	39	did not start			
—	31	Adam Žampa	Slovakia	1:14.26	52	did not start			
—	7	Daniel Yule	Switzerland	did not finish					
—	21	Albert Popov	Bulgaria	did not finish					
—	24	Istok Rodeš	Croatia	did not finish					
—	35	Laurie Taylor	Great Britain	did not finish					
—	36	Kamen Zlatkov	Bulgaria	did not finish					
—	38	Kristoffer Jakobsen	Sweden	did not finish					
—	39	Erik Read	Canada	did not finish					
—	40	Trevor Philp	Canada	did not finish					
—	41	Joaquim Salarich	Spain	did not finish					
—	43	Ondřej Berndt	Czech Republic	did not finish					
—	48	Joonas Räsänen	Finland	did not finish					
—	50	Kryštof Krýzl	Czech Republic	did not finish					
—	52	Sam Maes	Belgium	did not finish					
—	53	Carl Jonsson	Sweden	did not finish					
—	57	Kai Alaerts	Belgium	did not finish					
—	58	Dries Van den Broecke	Belgium	did not finish					
—	59	Adam Barwood	New Zealand	did not finish					
—	61	Aleksandr Andrienko	Russia	did not finish					
—	62	Tomas Birkner De Miguel	Argentina	did not finish					
—	63	Žaks Gedra	Latvia	did not finish					
—	65	Tom Verbeke	Belgium	did not finish					
—	68	Sebastiano Gastaldi	Argentina	did not finish					
—	69	Marko Šljivić	Bosnia and Herzegovina	did not finish					
—	70	Tormis Laine	Estonia	did not finish					
—	71	Ioannis Antoniou	Greece	did not finish					
—	72	Sturla Snær Snorrason	Iceland	did not finish					
—	73	Strahinja Stanišić	Serbia	did not finish					
—	74	Simon Breitfuss Kammerlander	Bolivia	did not finish					
—	75	Antonio Ristevski	North Macedonia	did not finish					
—	79	Casper Dyrbye Næsted	Denmark	did not finish					
—	81	Iason Abramashvili	Georgia	did not finish					
—	84	Morteza Jafari	Iran	did not finish					
—	85	Matthieu Osch	Luxembourg	did not finish					
—	87	Eldar Salihović	Montenegro	did not finish					
—	88	Bence Nagy	Hungary	did not finish					
—	90	Ivan Kovbasnyuk	Ukraine	did not finish					
—	91	Daniil Chertsin	Belarus	did not finish					
—	92	Komiljon Tukhtaev	Uzbekistan	did not finish					
—	95	Evgeniy Timofeev	Kyrgyzstan	did not finish					
—	97	Zhang Yangming	China	did not finish					
—	98	Connor Wilson	South Africa	did not finish					
—	20	Julien Lizeroux	France	disqualified					
—	99	Harutyun Harutyunyan	Armenia	did not start					

=== Qualification ===
Rank	Bib	Name	Nation	Run 1	Rank	Run 2	Rank	Total	Diff	Notes
1	2	Carl Jonsson	Sweden	45.33	1	48.46	1	1:33.79		Q
2	4	Anton Tremmel	Germany	45.47	2	50.05	24	1:35.52	+1.73	Q
3	12	Max van Rossum	Netherlands	46.68	7	48.93	3	1:35.61	+1.82	Q
4	5	Sam Maes	Belgium	45.96	3	49.77	19	1:35.73	+1.94	Q
5	23	Tormis Laine	Estonia	46.78	9	49.18	8	1:35.96	+2.17	Q
6	16	Axel Esteve	Andorra	46.68	7	49.46	16	1:36.14	+2.35	Q
7	15	Dries Van den Broecke	Belgium	46.48	5	49.67	18	1:36.15	+2.36	Q
8	6	Jakob Špik	Slovenia	46.99	14	49.26	9	1:36.25	+2.46	Q
9	14	Žaks Gedra	Latvia	47.05	15	49.30	12	1:36.35	+2.56	Q
10	17	Sebastiano Gastaldi	Argentina	47.14	19	49.27	10	1:36.41	+2.62	Q
11	39	Yoan Todorov	Bulgaria	47.64	26	48.78	2	1:36.42	+2.63	Q
12	25	Sturla Snær Snorrason	Iceland	47.31	20	49.12	5	1:36.43	+2.64	Q
13	1	Kai Alaerts	Belgium	46.82	11	49.63	17	1:36.45	+2.66	Q
14	13	Tom Verbeke	Belgium	47.33	21	49.32	13	1:36.65	+2.86	Q
15	37	Itamar Biran	Israel	47.64	26	49.04	4	1:36.68	+2.89	Q
16	18	Miks Zvejnieks	Latvia	47.62	25	49.12	5	1:36.74	+2.95	Q
17	32	Alec Scott	Australia	47.49	22	49.28	11	1:36.77	+2.98	Q
18	7	Alex Puente Tasias	Spain	47.06	16	49.78	20	1:36.84	+3.05	Q
19	33	Daniel Paulus	Czech Republic	47.81	29	49.15	7	1:36.96	+3.17	Q
20	11	Aleksandr Andrienko	Russia	47.11	18	49.89	22	1:37.00	+3.21	Q
21	10	Billy Major	Great Britain	46.62	6	50.42	28	1:37.04	+3.25	Q
22	20	Marko Šljivić	Bosnia and Herzegovina	47.61	24	49.44	15	1:37.05	+3.26	Q
23	38	Iason Abramashvili	Georgia	47.79	28	49.33	14	1:37.12	+3.33	Q
24	3	Zak Vinter	Great Britain	46.80	10	50.49	30	1:37.29	+3.50	Q
25	8	Tomas Birkner De Miguel	Argentina	46.97	13	50.38	26	1:37.35	+3.56	Q
26	22	Michal Staszowski	Czech Republic	46.96	12	50.43	29	1:37.39	+3.60	
27	9	Adam Barwood	New Zealand	47.10	17	50.35	25	1:37.45	+3.66	q
28	27	Simon Breitfuss Kammerlander	Bolivia	47.83	30	49.88	21	1:37.71	+3.92	q
29	21	Martin Hyška	Slovakia	47.86	31	49.96	23	1:37.82	+4.03	
30	45	Matthieu Osch	Luxembourg	48.17	34	50.53	31	1:38.70	+4.91	q
31	36	Casper Dyrbye Næsted	Denmark	47.89	32	50.83	34	1:38.72	+4.93	q
32	26	Strahinja Stanišić	Serbia	47.98	33	51.01	35	1:38.99	+5.20	q
33	29	Cristian Javier Simari Birkner	Argentina	48.59	36	50.79	33	1:39.38	+5.59	
34	30	Willis Feasey	New Zealand	48.76	37	50.71	32	1:39.47	+5.68	
35	51	Marcus Vorre	Denmark	49.15	41	50.40	27	1:39.55	+5.76	
36	42	Cormac Comerford	Ireland	48.87	38	51.65	38	1:40.52	+6.73	q
37	55	Elvis Opmanis	Latvia	49.14	40	51.39	36	1:40.53	+6.74	
38	44	Yuri Danilochkin	Belarus	49.12	39	51.83	39	1:40.95	+7.16	
39	49	Bence Nagy	Hungary	49.94	48	51.59	37	1:41.53	+7.74	q
40	19	Emir Lokmić	Bosnia and Herzegovina	46.43	4	55.88	57	1:42.31	+8.52	
41	50	Rastko Blagojević	Serbia	50.38	50	52.18	40	1:42.56	+8.77	
42	47	Eldar Salihović	Montenegro	49.60	44	53.20	42	1:42.80	+9.01	q
43	77	Dardan Dehari	North Macedonia	50.27	49	52.60	41	1:42.87	+9.08	
44	46	Andrej Drukarov	Lithuania	50.75	57	53.31	44	1:44.06	+10.27	q
45	43	Morteza Jafari	Iran	50.45	52	53.66	45	1:44.11	+10.32	q
46	59	Daniil Chertsin	Belarus	51.06	59	53.72	46	1:44.78	+10.99	q
47	73	Daniels Loss	Latvia	50.68	55	54.16	48	1:44.84	+11.05	
48	65	Erjon Tola	Albania	51.60	63	53.29	43	1:44.89	+11.10	q
49	62	Sigurður Hauksson	Iceland	51.06	59	54.32	49	1:45.38	+11.59	
50	98	Albin Tahiri	KOS	52.04	65	53.99	47	1:46.03	+12.24	
51	78	Zakhar Kuchin	Kazakhstan	51.43	62	54.77	50	1:46.20	+12.41	q
52	82	Mátyás Maróty	Hungary	51.13	61	55.46	56	1:46.59	+12.80	
53	80	Zhang Yangming	China	52.39	67	54.83	51	1:47.22	+13.43	q
54	96	Wang Liwei	China	53.03	74	55.27	53	1:48.30	+14.51	
55	88	Sergey Danov	Kazakhstan	53.14	76	55.27	53	1:48.41	+14.62	
56	71	Emmanouil Zografos-Manos	Greece	52.59	69	55.94	58	1:48.53	+14.74	
57	74	Viktor Petkov	North Macedonia	52.75	71	56.04	59	1:48.79	+15.00	
58	87	Uladzislau Chertsin	Belarus	53.69	79	55.12	52	1:48.81	+15.02	
59	68	Vasileios Mantsios	Greece	52.48	68	56.55	62	1:49.03	+15.24	
60	67	Yianno Kouyoumdjian	Cyprus	52.79	73	56.38	60	1:49.17	+15.38	q
61	89	Cong Liang	China	54.37	82	55.43	55	1:49.80	+16.01	
62	97	Bastian Blaafalk	Denmark	52.76	72	57.48	66	1:50.24	+16.45	
63	106	Balázs Hegyi	Hungary	54.56	83	57.09	64	1:51.65	+17.86	
64	90	Cesar Arnouk	Lebanon	53.91	81	57.75	67	1:51.66	+17.87	
65	107	Gao Qun	China	55.07	84	57.42	65	1:52.49	+18.70	
66	84	Connor Wilson	South Africa	55.51	86	57.05	63	1:52.56	+18.77	q
67	83	Giorgos Kakkouras	Cyprus	55.07	84	57.95	68	1:53.02	+19.23	
68	95	Arsen Ghazaryan	Armenia	57.15	88	59.03	69	1:56.18	+22.39	
69	86	Harutyun Harutyunyan	Armenia	1:00.90	96	56.40	61	1:57.30	+23.51	q
70	100	Arbi Pupovci	KOS	59.60	93	1:00.68	70	2:00.28	+26.49	
71	104	Andy Randriamiarisoa	Madagascar	59.06	92	1:02.39	71	2:01.45	+27.66	
72	103	Cyril Kayrouz	Lebanon	58.93	91	1:02.61	73	2:01.54	+27.75	
73	116	Ricardo Brancal	Portugal	1:00.33	95	1:02.52	72	2:02.85	+29.06	q
74	101	Arif Khan	India	1:01.81	97	1:04.91	74	2:06.72	+32.93	
75	112	Carlos Maeder	Ghana	1:01.97	98	1:05.14	75	2:07.11	+33.32	
76	110	Hubertus von Hohenlohe	Mexico	1:02.86	99	1:05.24	76	2:08.10	+34.31	
77	111	Marsel Bicoku	Albania	1:03.74	100	1:05.44	77	2:09.19	+35.40	
78	113	Suhail Azzam	Jordan	1:07.92	103	1:07.78	78	2:15.70	+41.91	
79	109	Georges Samaha	Lebanon	1:06.08	102	1:10.05	79	2:16.13	+42.34	
80	121	Jean-Pierre Roy	Haiti	1:22.47	104	1:25.28	80	2:47.75	+1:13.96	
	28	Antonio Ristevski	North Macedonia	48.33	35	did not finish				q
	34	Alexandru Barbu	Romania	49.18	42	did not finish				q
	66	Besarion Japaridze	Georgia	49.34	43	did not finish				
	54	Ivan Kovbasnyuk	Ukraine	49.64	45	did not finish				q
	48	Soso Japharidze	Georgia	49.83	46	did not finish				
	35	Kieran Norris	Ireland	49.84	47	did not finish				
	52	Michael Poettoz	Colombia	50.42	51	did not finish				q
	64	Komiljon Tukhtaev	Uzbekistan	50.52	53	did not finish				q
	81	Levko Tsibelenko	Ukraine	50.62	54	did not finish				
	53	Mihajlo Đorđević	Serbia	50.72	56	did not finish				
	72	Gísli Rafn Guðmundsson	Iceland	50.80	58	did not finish				
	57	Porya Saveh Shemshaki	Iran	51.75	64	did not finish				
	63	Luka Bozhinovski	North Macedonia	52.10	66	did not finish				
	70	Dino Terzić	Bosnia and Herzegovina	52.64	70	did not finish				
	56	Kristinn Logi Auðunsson	Iceland	53.13	75	did not finish				
	99	Andriy Mariichyn	Ukraine	53.35	77	did not finish				
	58	Behnam Kia Shemshaki	Iran	53.48	78	did not finish				
	76	Evgeniy Timofeev	Kyrgyzstan	56.39	87	did not finish				q
	102	Ho Ping-jui	Chinese Taipei	57.20	89	did not finish				
	105	Maksim Gordeev	Kyrgyzstan	57.23	90	did not finish				
	108	Anton Pushkarnykh	Kyrgyzstan	1:00.30	94	did not finish				
	118	Alim Ibragimov	Kyrgyzstan	1:04.33	101	did not finish				
	40	Benjamin Szollos	Israel	47.59	23	disqualified				
	69	Vilius Aleksandravičius	Lithuania	53.69	79	disqualified				
	24	Ioannis Antoniou	Greece	did not finish						q
	31	Nikolaos Tziovas	Greece	did not finish						
	60	Mohammad Saveh Shemshaki	Iran	did not finish						
	61	Mateja Minić	Serbia	did not finish						
	75	Strahinja Đokanović	Bosnia and Herzegovina	did not finish						
	85	Samuel Almeida	Portugal	did not finish						
	91	Andreas Epiphaniou	Cyprus	did not finish						
	92	Naim Fenianos	Lebanon	did not finish						
	93	Yohan Goutt Gonçalves	Timor-Leste	did not finish						
	94	Bojan Kosić	Montenegro	did not finish						
	114	Yassine Aouich	Morocco	did not finish						
	115	Vasil Veriga	Albania	did not finish						
	117	Mathieu Kaco	Albania	did not finish						
	119	Saphal-Ram Shrestha	Nepal	did not finish						
	41	Aleksi Beniaidze	Georgia	disqualified						
	79	Faton Shurdhaj	KOS	did not start						
	120	Kasete Naufahu Skeen	Tonga	did not start						
