= Andreas Žampa =

Slovak alpine skier (born 1993)

Personal information
- Born: 13 August 1993 (age 32) Vysoké Tatry, Slovakia
- Height: 1.69 m (5 ft 7 in)

Skiing career
- Country: Slovakia
- Sport: Alpine skiing
- Club: Žampa Ski Club Vysoké Tatry
- Disciplines: Giant slalom
- World Cup debut: 2 December 2012 (age 19)

Olympics
- Teams: 4 – (2014–2026)
- Medals: 0

World Championships
- Teams: 7 – (2011–2021, 2025)
- Medals: 1 (0 gold)

World Cup
- Seasons: 14 – (2013–2026)
- Podiums: 0
- Overall titles: 0 – (117th in 2017)
- Discipline titles: 0 – (39th in AC, 2016)
Medal record
Men's alpine skiing
Representing Slovakia
World Championships
Silver medal – second place	2017 St. Moritz	Team event

Andreas Žampa (born 13 August 1993) is a Slovak alpine skier. He competed for Slovakia at the 2014, 2018 and 2022 Winter Olympics in the alpine skiing. His brothers are Adam Žampa and Teo Žampa.

== World Cup results ==
=== Season standings ===
Season
Season	Age	Overall	Slalom	Giant slalom	Super-G	Downhill	Combined	Parallel
2016	22	142	—	—	—	—	39	—N/a
2017	23	117	—	43	—	—	—	—N/a
2018	24	122	—	44	—	—	—	—N/a
2019	25	120	—	40	—	—	—	—N/a
2020	26	no World Cup points						
2021	27	135	—	48	—	—	—N/a	—
2022	28	138	—	49	—	—	—N/a	—
2023	29	no World Cup points					—N/a	—N/a
2024	30	132	—	49	—	—	—N/a	—N/a
2025	31	130	—	45	—	—	—N/a	—N/a
2026	32	133	—	42	—	—	—N/a	—N/a

Standings through 1 February 2026

=== Top twenty finishes ===
- 0 podiums, 3 top twenties

Season
Season	Date	Location	Discipline	Place
2018	6 Jan 2018	Adelboden, Switzerland	Giant slalom	18th
2019	12 Jan 2019	Adelboden, Switzerland	Giant slalom	20th
2025	22 Dec 2024	Alta Badia, Italy	Giant slalom	18th

== World Championship results ==
Year
Year	Age	Slalom	Giant slalom	Super-G	Downhill	Combined	Team combined	Parallel	Team event
2011	17	—	82	—	—	—	—N/a	—N/a	—
2013	19	DNF2	DNF1	—	—	—	—N/a	—N/a	—
2015	21	29	32	41	41	39	—N/a	—N/a	—
2017	23	DNF2	34	DNF1	—	40	—N/a	—N/a	2
2019	25	—	DNF2	—	—	—	—N/a	—N/a	—
2021	27	—	20	—	—	—	—N/a	DNQ	—
2025	31	—	20	—	—	—N/a	—	—N/a	—

== Olympic results ==
Year
Year	Age	Slalom	Giant slalom	Super-G	Downhill	Combined	Team combined	Team event
2014	20	DNF2	32	36	—	—	—N/a	—N/a
2018	24	35	DNF2	39	—	—	—N/a	9
2022	28	DNF2	16	—	—	—	—N/a	12
2026	32	—	21	—	—	—N/a	—	—N/a
