= Maxence Muzaton =

French alpine skier (born 1990)

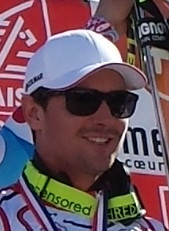
- Muzaton in 2014

Personal information
- Born: 26 June 1990 (age 36) Epernay, Marne, France

Skiing career
- Country: France
- Sport: Alpine skiing
- Club: C.S. La Plagne
- Disciplines: Downhill, Super-G, Combined
- World Cup debut: 11 March 2010 (age 19)

Olympics
- Teams: 3 – (2018, 2022, 2026)
- Medals: 0

World Championships
- Teams: 6 – (2015–2025)
- Medals: 0

World Cup
- Seasons: 16 – (2010–2011, 2013–2026)
- Wins: 0
- Podiums: 2 – (1 DH, 1 AC)
- Overall titles: 0 – (34th in 2020)
- Discipline titles: 0 – (5th in AC, 2017)
Medal record
Men's alpine skiing
Representing France
Junior World Championships
Gold medal – first place	2010 Megève	Super-G

Maxence Muzaton (French pronunciation: [maksɑ̃s myzatɔ̃]; born 26 June 1990) is a French World Cup alpine ski racer. He specializes in the speed event of downhill, and also competes in the super-G and combined events.

Born in Epernay, Marne, Muzaton competed at the 2015 World Championships in Beaver Creek, US, in the super combined. He achieved his first World Cup podium in January 2017, a second place in a super combined at Wengen, Switzerland.

At the 2021 World Championships, Muzaton lost control during a turn and injured his knee.

In January 2026, he achieved his second World Cup podium, a third place in the classic downhill at Kitzbühel, Austria.

== World Cup results ==
=== Season standings ===
Season
Season	Age	Overall	Slalom	Giant slalom	Super-G	Downhill	Combined
2013	22	100	—	—	—	42	26
2014	23	140	—	—	—	—	37
2015	24	88	—	—	—	34	25
2016	25	90	—	—	53	32	32
2017	26	50	—	—	33	29	5
2018	27	54	—	—	—	23	35
2019	28	99	—	—	46	29	34
2020	29	34	—	—	—	11	—
2021	30	99	—	—	—	30	—N/a
2022	31	76	—	—	—	26	—N/a
2023	32	100	—	—	—	40	—N/a
2024	33	64	—	—	—	18	—N/a
2025	34	68	—	—	—	20	—N/a
2026	35	51	—	—	—	13	—N/a

=== Top-ten results ===
- 0 wins
- 2 podiums – (1 DH, 1 AC); 11 top tens (10 DH, 1 AC)

Season
Season	Date	Location	Discipline	Place
2017	13 January 2017	Wengen, Switzerland	Combined	2nd
2018	13 January 2018	Wengen, Switzerland	Downhill	7th
2018	14 March 2018	Åre, Sweden	Downhill	6th
2020	27 December 2019	Bormio, Italy	Downhill	5th
2020	28 December 2019	Bormio, Italy	Downhill	9th
2020	25 January 2020	Kitzbühel, Austria	Downhill	5th
2020	13 February 2020	Saalbach, Austria	Downhill	8th
2022	5 March 2022	Kvitfjell, Norway	Downhill	8th
2024	20 January 2024	Kitzbühel, Austria	Downhill	5th
2024	25 January 2025	Kitzbühel, Austria	Downhill	7th
2026	24 January 2026	Kitzbühel, Austria	Downhill	3rd

== World Championship results ==
Year
Year	Age	Slalom	Giant slalom	Super-G	Downhill	Combined	Team combined
2015	24	—	—	—	—	38	—N/a
2017	26	—	—	—	—	DNF2	—N/a
2019	28	—	—	—	30	25	—N/a
2021	30	—	—	—	DNF	—	—N/a
2023	32	—	—	—	6	—	—N/a
2025	34	—	—	—	18	—N/a	12

== Olympic results ==
Year
Year	Age	Slalom	Giant slalom	Super-G	Downhill	Combined	Team combined
2018	27	—	—	18	23	DNF2	—N/a
2022	31	—	—	—	11	—	—N/a
2026	35	—	—	—	DNF	—N/a	15
