= Luca Aerni =

Swiss alpine skier (born 1993)

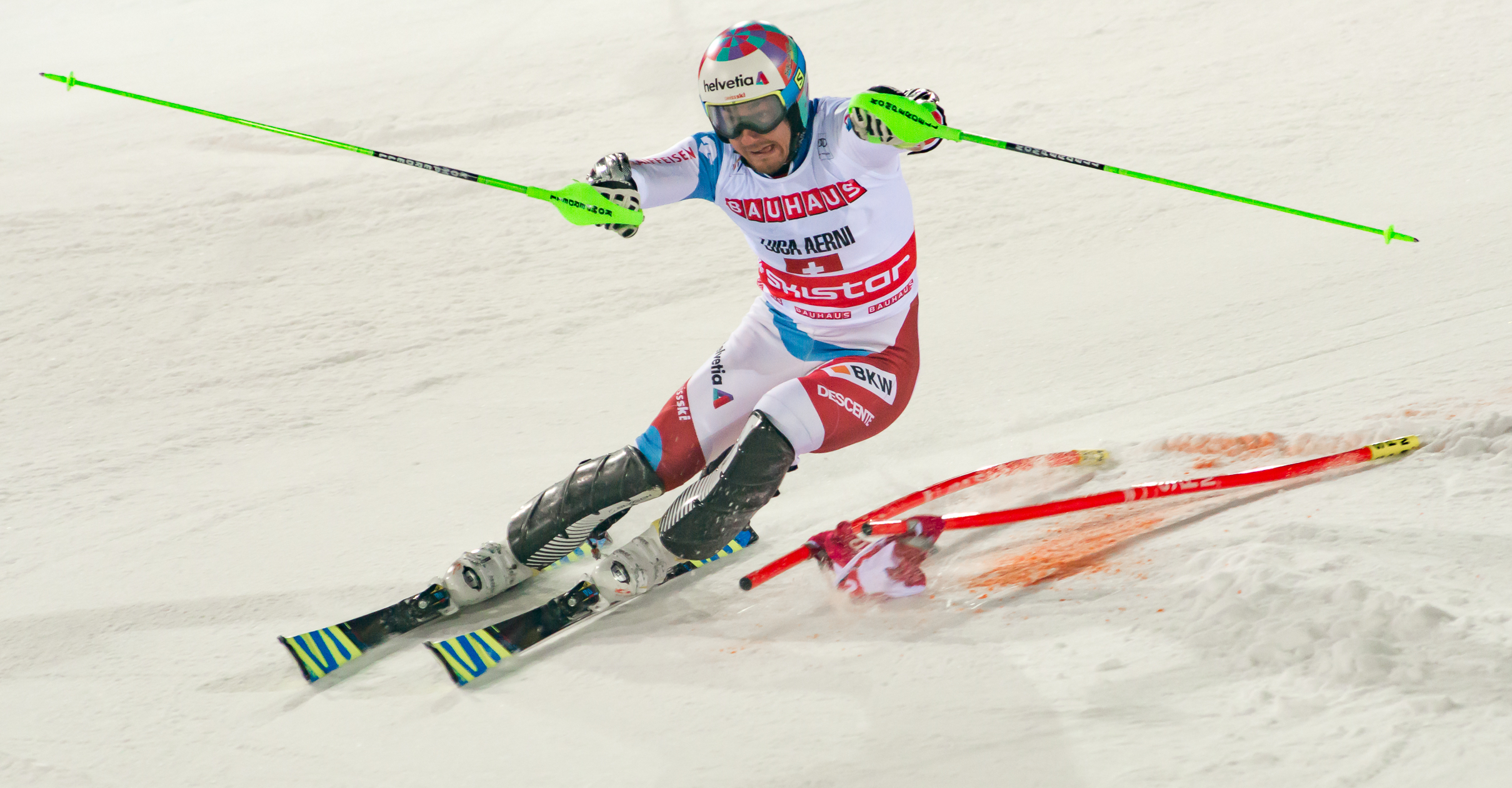
- Aerni in Hammarbybacken 2018

Personal information
- Born: 27 March 1993 (age 33) Châtel-Saint-Denis, Fribourg, Switzerland
- Height: 1.77 m (5 ft 10 in)
- Website: luca-aerni.ch

Skiing career
- Country: Switzerland
- Sport: Alpine skiing
- Club: Les Barzettes
- Disciplines: Slalom, Combined
- World Cup debut: December 2012 (age 19)

Olympics
- Teams: 4 – (2014–2026)
- Medals: 1 (1 gold)

World Championships
- Teams: 4 – (2017–2021, 2025)
- Medals: 2 (1 gold)

World Cup
- Seasons: 14 – (2013–2026)
- Wins: 0
- Podiums: 2 – (1 SL, 1 GS)
- Overall titles: 0 – (25th in 2018)
- Discipline titles: 0 – (7th in SL, 2018)
Medal record
Men's alpine skiing
Representing Switzerland
Olympic Games
Gold medal – first place	2018 Pyeongchang	Team event
World Championships
Gold medal – first place	2017 St. Moritz	Combined
Silver medal – second place	2025 Saalbach	Team event
Junior World Championships
Silver medal – second place	2014 Jasná	Slalom

Luca Aerni (born 27 March 1993) is a Swiss World Cup alpine ski racer. Born in Châtel-Saint-Denis, he competed for Switzerland at three Winter Olympics and three World Championships.

At the World Championships in 2017 on home snow in St. Moritz, Aerni won the gold medal in the combined event.

== World Cup results ==
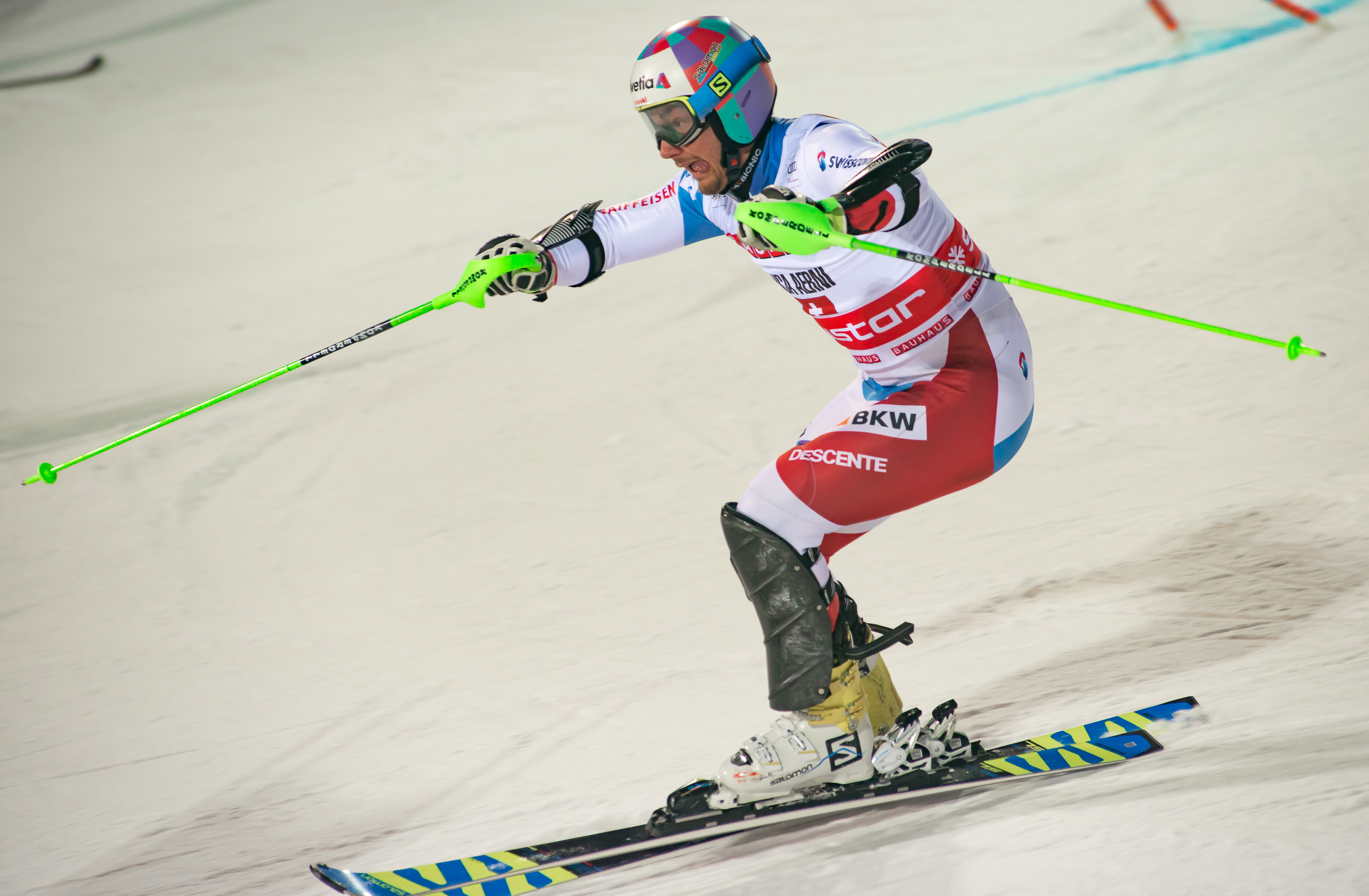
Aerni in Hammarbybacken World Cup 2018

=== Season standings ===
Season
Season	Age	Overall	Slalom	Giant slalom	Super-G	Downhill	Combined	Parallel
2013	19	94	36	—	—	—	—	—N/a
2014	20	65	21	—	—	—	—	—N/a
2015	21	92	27	—	—	—	—	—N/a
2016	22	87	29	—	—	—	15	—N/a
2017	23	46	15	—	—	—	15	—N/a
2018	24	25	7	36	—	—	—	—N/a
2019	25	77	30	—	—	—	31	—N/a
2020	26	96	50	—	—	—	17	—
2021	27	46	14	—	—	—	—N/a	—
2022	28	64	24	—	—	—	—N/a	—
2023	29	74	26	—	—	—	—N/a	—N/a
2024	30	54	19	49	—	—	—N/a	—N/a
2025	31	46	29	20	—	—	—N/a	—N/a
2026	32	42	—	13	—	—	—N/a	—N/a

=== Race podiums ===
- 0 wins
- 2 podiums (1 SL, 1 GS); 27 top tens

Season
Season	Date	Location	Discipline	Place
2018	22 December 2017	Madonna di Campiglio, Italy	Slalom	2nd
2026	13 December 2025	Val-d'Isère, France	Giant slalom	2nd

== World Championship results ==
Year
Year	Age	Slalom	Giant slalom	Super-G	Downhill	Combined	Team combined	Parallel	Team event
2017	23	19	—	—	—	1	—N/a	—N/a	—
2019	25	—	—	—	—	8	—N/a	—N/a	—
2021	27	DNF1	—	—	—	DNF2	—N/a	—	—
2025	31	—	DNF2	—	—	—N/a	—	—N/a	2

== Olympic results ==
Year
Year	Age	Slalom	Giant slalom	Super-G	Downhill	Combined	Team combined	Team event
2014	20	DNF	—	—	—	—	—N/a	—N/a
2018	24	DNF	19	—	—	11	—N/a	1
2022	28	14	—	—	—	DNF2	—N/a	—
2026	32	—	18	—	—	—N/a	—	—N/a
