= Justin Murisier =

Swiss alpine skier

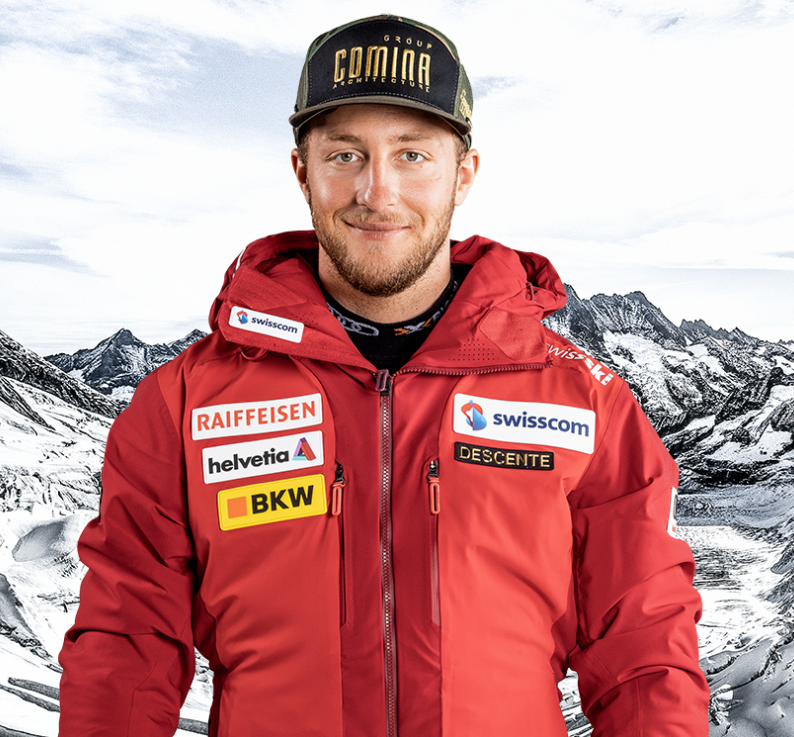
- Murisier in 2022

Personal information
- Born: 8 January 1992 (age 34) Martigny, Valais, Switzerland
- Height: 1.75 m (5 ft 9 in)
- Website: justinmurisier.ch

Skiing career
- Country: Switzerland
- Sport: Alpine skiing
- Club: Bagnes
- Disciplines: Downhill, super-G, Giant slalom, combined
- World Cup debut: 10 January 2010 (age 18)

Olympics
- Teams: 3 – (2014, 2018, 2022)
- Medals: 0

World Championships
- Teams: 6 – (2011, 2015–2025)
- Medals: 0

World Cup
- Seasons: 19 – (2010–2011, 2014–2018, 2020–2021)
- Wins: 1 – (1 DH)
- Podiums: 2 – (1 GS, 1 DH)
- Overall titles: 0 – (17th in 2022 and 2025)
- Discipline titles: 0 – (4th in AC, 2017)
Medal record
Men's alpine skiing
Representing Switzerland
Junior World Championships
Silver medal – second place	2011 Crans-Montana	Slalom
Silver medal – second place	2011 Crans-Montana	Combined
Bronze medal – third place	2011 Crans-Montana	Super G

Justin Murisier (born 8 January 1992) is a Swiss World Cup alpine ski racer who competes in giant slalom, super-G and downhill. Earlier, he also competed in slalom.

== Career ==
Born in Martigny, Valais, Murisier has competed at three Winter Olympics and five World Championships. His first World Cup podium came in December 2020 at Alta Badia, Italy, and his first win came in December 2024 in the downhill at Beaver Creek, Colorado, US.

Murisier's father is a cousin of alpine ski racer William Besse (b.1968).

== World Cup results ==
=== Season standings ===
Season
Season	Age	Overall	Slalom	Giant slalom	Super-G	Downhill	Combined
2011	19	85	32	45	—	—	—
2014	22	100	—	—	—	—	16
2015	23	96	50	31	—	—	21
2016	24	46	—	12	—	—	19
2017	25	36	—	13	—	—	4
2018	26	30	—	7	—	—	9
2020	28	52	—	26	—	—	12
2021	29	37	—	10	31	—	—N/a
2022	30	17	—	9	16	52	—N/a
2023	31	26	—	32	7	28	—N/a
2024	32	20	—	29	17	14	—N/a
2025	33	17	—	43	17	7	—N/a
2026	34	53	—	—	35	19	—N/a

=== Race podiums ===
- 1 win (1 DH)
- 2 podiums (1 DH, 1 GS); 48 top tens

Season
Season	Date	Location	Discipline	Place
2021	20 December 2020	Alta Badia, Italy	Giant slalom	3rd
2025	6 December 2024	Beaver Creek, United States	Downhill	1st

== World Championship results ==
Year
Year	Age	Slalom	Giant slalom	Super-G	Downhill	Combined	Team combined	Parallel	Team event
2011	19	25	13	—	—	—	—N/a	—N/a	—
2015	23	13	30	—	—	—	—N/a	—N/a	—
2017	25	—	8	—	—	6	—N/a	—N/a	—
2021	29	—	DNF1	—	—	8	—N/a	DNQ	—
2023	31	—	—	—	12	DNF2	—N/a	—	—
2025	33	—	—	—	6	—N/a	DNF2	—N/a	—

== Olympic results ==
Year
Year	Age	Slalom	Giant slalom	Super-G	Downhill	Combined	Team event
2014	22	DNF2	—	—	—	—	—N/a
2018	26	—	DNF1	—	—	DNF2	—
2022	30	—	DNF1	—	—	4	6
