= Johan Clarey =

French alpine skier

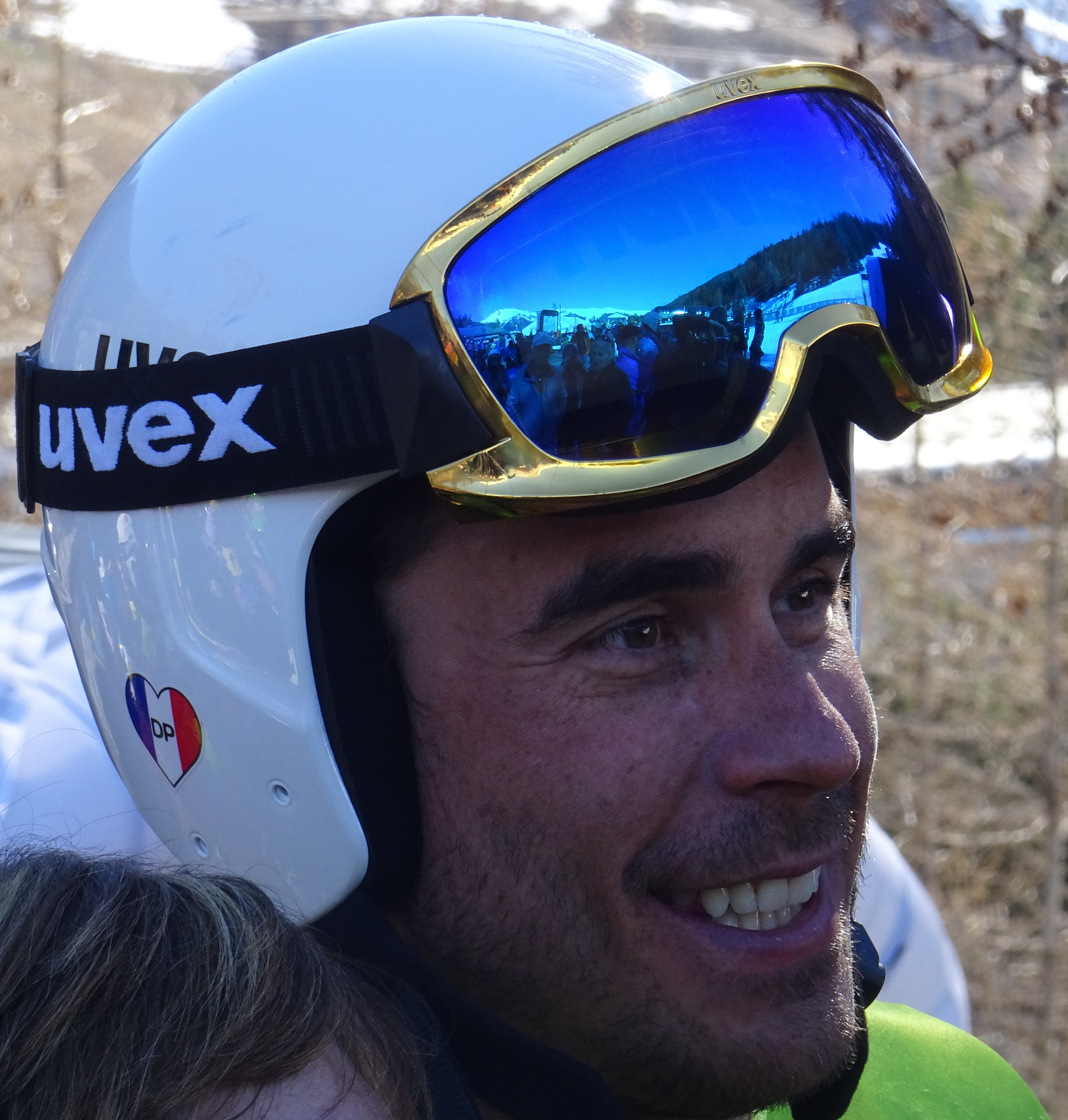
- Clarey in 2019

Personal information
- Born: 8 January 1981 (age 45) Annecy, Haute-Savoie, France
- Height: 1.91 m (6 ft 3 in)
- Website: johanclarey.com

Skiing career
- Sport: Alpine skiing
- Club: Douanes – C.S. Tignes
- Disciplines: Downhill, super-G
- World Cup debut: 29 November 2003 (age 22)

Olympics
- Teams: 4 – (2010–2022)
- Medals: 1 (0 gold)

World Championships
- Teams: 6 – (2011, 2015–2023)
- Medals: 1 (0 gold)

World Cup
- Seasons: 18 – (2004, 2007–2023)
- Wins: 0
- Podiums: 11 – (10 DH, 1 SG)
- Overall titles: 0 – (19th in 2019–2022)
- Discipline titles: 0 – (4th in DH, 2021)
Medal record
Men's alpine skiing
Representing France
Olympic Games
Silver medal – second place	2022 Beijing	Downhill
World Championships
Silver medal – second place	2019 Åre	Super-G

Johan Clarey (born 8 January 1981) is a French World Cup alpine ski racer. He specializes in the speed events of downhill and super-G.

Born in Annecy, Haute-Savoie, Clarey made his World Cup debut in November 2003 and has ten World Cup podiums through December 2023. He set a World Cup speed record in 2013 at the classic downhill race in Wengen, Switzerland, with a maximum speed of 161.9 km/h (100.6 mph) at the Haneggschuss, the fastest section of the Lauberhorn slope. Clarey finished fifth and was injured the following week at Kitzbühel and missed the remainder of the 2013 season, including the world championships.

In the winter of 2014–15, Clarey was in the top 10 three times in World Cup races and twice in the winter of 2015–16. He was again on the podium in January 2017 in Kitzbühel. At age forty in January 2021, Clarey finished second in the downhill at Kitzbühel to become the oldest ever to make a World Cup podium, his eighth. One year later he again finished second in a Kitzbühel downhill race, thus beating his own age record.

At the 2022 Winter Olympics in China, 41-year-old Clarey was the silver medalist in the downhill, one-tenth of a second back.

In March 2023, Clarey retired from competitions. At the time of retirement, he was the oldest Olympic medalist in alpine skiing, the oldest World Championship medalist, and the oldest alpine skier to stand on a World Cup podium.

== World Cup results ==
=== Season standings ===
Season	Age	Overall	Slalom	Giant Slalom	Super-G	Downhill	Combined
2004	23	140	—	—	—	54	—
2005	24						
2006	25						
2007	26	86	—	—	—	33	38
2008	27	78	—	—	—	30	41
2009	28	92	—	—	—	31	—
2010	29	61	—	—	—	19	47
2011	30	56	—	—	48	19	—
2012	31	29	—	—	31	10	—
2013	32	23	—	—	12	12	—
2014	33	25	—	—	25	7	—
2015	34	32	—	—	23	16	—
2016	35	37	—	—	41	15	—
2016	35	37	—	—	41	15	—
2017	36	52	—	—	50	17	—
2018	37	54	—	—	—	18	—
2019	38	19	—	—	8	8	—
2020	39	19	—	—	15	7	—
2021	40	19	—	—	26	4	—N/a
2022	41	19	—	—	31	9	—N/a
2023	42	19	—	—	40	4	—N/a

=== Race podiums ===
- 0 wins
- 11 podiums (10 DH, 1 SG); 64 top tens

Season	Date	Location	Discipline	Place
2010	19 December 2009	Val Gardena, Italy	Downhill	3rd
2014	21 December 2013	Val Gardena, Italy	Downhill	3rd
2014	1 March 2014	Kvitfjell, Norway	Downhill	2nd
2017	21 January 2017	Kitzbühel, Austria	Downhill	3rd
2019	27 January 2019	Kitzbühel, Austria	Super-G	2nd
2020	8 December 2019	(United States) Beaver Creek, USA	Downhill	2nd
2020	1 February 2020	Garmisch-Partenkirchen, Germany	Downhill	3rd
2021	24 January 2021	Kitzbühel, Austria	Downhill	2nd
2022	21 January 2022	Kitzbühel, Austria	Downhill	2nd
2023	17 December 2022	Val Gardena, Italy	Downhill	2nd
2023	21 January 2023	Kitzbühel, Austria	Downhill	2nd

== World Championship results ==
Year	Age	Slalom	Giant Slalom	Super-G	Downhill	Combined
2011	30	—	—	—	8	—
2013	32	injured, did not compete				
2015	34	—	—	30	16	—
2017	36	—	—	—	DNF	—
2019	38	—	—	2	17	—
2021	40	—	—	DNF	16	—
2023	42	—	—	—	23	—

== Olympic results ==
Year	Age	Slalom	Giant Slalom	Super-G	Downhill	Combined
2010	29	—	—	—	27	DNF1
2014	33	—	—	19	DNF	—
2018	37	—	—	—	18	—
2022	41	—	—	—	2	—

== Video ==
- You Tube – Johan Clarey sets alpine ski record – Universal Sports – 19 January 2013
