= Mattia Casse =

Italian alpine skier (born 1990)

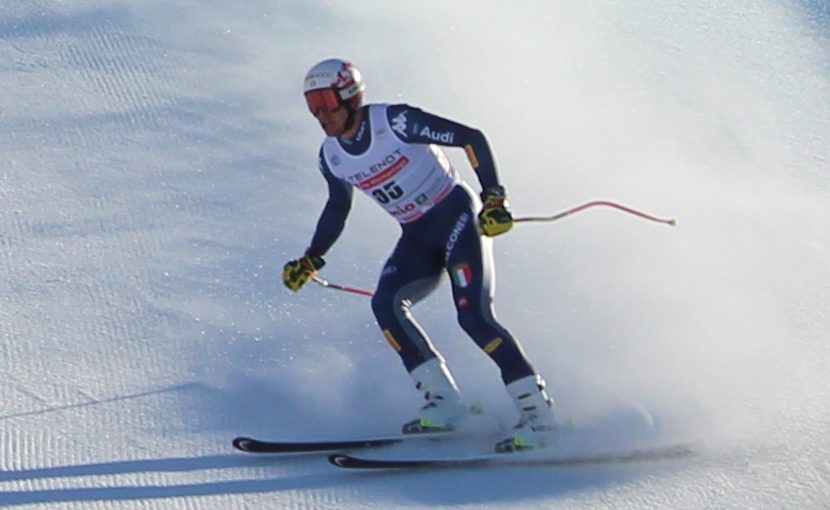
- At Bormio in December 2019

Personal information
- Born: 19 February 1990 (age 36) Moncalieri, Piedmont, Italy
- Height: 1.82 m (6 ft 0 in)

Skiing career
- Country: Italy
- Sport: Alpine skiing
- Club: G.S. Fiamme Oro Moena
- Disciplines: Downhill, Super-G, Combined
- World Cup debut: 29 December 2009 (age 20)

Olympics
- Teams: 1 – (2026)
- Medals: 0

World Championships
- Teams: 5 – (2017–2025)
- Medals: 0

World Cup
- Seasons: 17 – (2010–2026)
- Wins: 1 – (1 SG)
- Podiums: 4 – (2 DH, 2 SG)
- Overall titles: 0 – (14th in 2023)
- Discipline titles: 0 – (6th in SG, 2020)

Mattia Casse (born 19 February 1990) is an Italian World Cup alpine ski racer. Born in Moncalieri in the Piedmont region of northwestern Italy, he specializes in the speed events (Downhill and Super-G) and has competed in four World Championships.

== Career ==
The son of the ski racer and trainer Alessandro, Casse made his World Cup debut on 29 December 2009 in a downhill at Bormio, just missing out on points in 31st place. He scored his first World cup points later that season on 10 March, finishing 22nd in the Garmisch-Partenkirchen downhill.

Casse attained his first top ten result in December 2015 with a fourth place in the Super-G at Beaver Creek, just missing the podium; his first podium came in December 2022 on the Saslong, taking third in the second downhill of the week at Val Gardena.

== World Cup results ==
=== Season standings ===
Season
Season	Age	Overall	Slalom	Giant slalom	Super-G	Downhill	Combined
2010	20	155	—	—	—	57	—
2011	21	164	—	—	57	—	—
2012	22	92	—	41	54	43	—
2013	23	Injured, did not compete					
2014	24	126	—	—	43	—	—
2015	25	85	—	—	37	40	—
2016	26	48	—	—	17	31	32
2017	27	109	—	—	—	44	26
2018	28	154	—	—	43	—	—
2019	29	77	—	—	32	30	41
2020	30	26	—	—	6	24	—
2021	31	Injured, did not compete					—N/a
2022	32	55	—	—	24	30	—N/a
2023	33	14	—	—	14	6	—N/a
2024	34	21	—	—	13	12	—N/a
2025	35	18	—	—	7	17	—N/a
2026	36	22	—	—	14	11	—N/a

=== Race podiums ===
- 1 win (1 SG)
- 4 podiums – (2 DH, 2 SG), 35 top tens

Season
Season	Date	Location	Discipline	Place
2023	17 December 2022	Val Gardena, Italy	Downhill	3rd
2023	14 January 2023	Wengen, Switzerland	Downhill	3rd
2023	28 January 2023	Cortina d'Ampezzo, Italy	Super-G	3rd
2025	20 December 2024	Val Gardena, Italy	Super-G	1st

== World Championship results ==
Year
Year	Age	Slalom	Giant slalom	Super-G	Downhill	Combined	Team combined
2017	27	—	—	19	22	DNF2	—N/a
2019	29	—	—	8	17	27	—N/a
2021	31	—	—	DNF	—	—	—N/a
2023	33	—	—	13	20	DSQ1	—N/a
2025	35	—	—	23	22	—N/a	7

== Olympic results ==
Year
Year	Age	Slalom	Giant slalom	Super-G	Downhill	Team combined
2026	36	—	—	24	11	14
