= Istok Rodeš =

Croatian alpine skier (born 1996)

Personal information
- Born: 27 January 1996 (age 30) Varaždin, Croatia
- Height: 1.83 m (6 ft 0 in)

Skiing career
- Sport: Alpine skiing
- Club: SK Varaždin
- Disciplines: Slalom
- World Cup debut: 6 January 2013 (age 16)

World Cup
- Seasons: 13 – (2013–2025)
Medal record
Men's alpine skiing
Representing Croatia
World Junior Ski Championships
| Gold medal – first place | 2016 Sochi | Slalom |
| Bronze medal – third place | 2016 Sochi | Combined |

Istok Rodeš (Croatian pronunciation: [ǐstok rǒdeʃ]; born 27 January 1996) is a Croatian World Cup alpine ski racer who specializes in slalom.

== World Cup results ==
=== Season standings ===
Season
| Season | Age | Overall | Slalom | Giant; Slalom | Super G | Downhill | Combined | Parallel |
| 2013 | 17 | — | — | — | — | — | —N/a | —N/a |
| 2014 | 18 | — | — | — | — | — | —N/a | —N/a |
| 2015 | 19 | — | — | — | — | — | —N/a | —N/a |
| 2016 | 20 | — | — | — | — | — | | —N/a |
| 2017 | 21 | 147 | 57 | — | — | — | — | —N/a |
| 2018 | 22 | — | — | — | — | — | — | —N/a |
| 2019 | 23 | 61 | 21 | — | — | — | — | —N/a |
| 2020 | 24 | 111 | 40 | — | — | — | — | — |
| 2021 | 25 | 121 | 40 | — | — | — | — | — |
| 2022 | 26 | 90 | 33 | — | — | — | — | — |
| 2023 | 27 | 119 | 40 | — | — | — | — | —N/a |
| 2024 | 28 | 75 | 26 | — | — | — | — | —N/a |
| 2025 | 29 | 82 | 31 | — | — | — | — | —N/a |

- Standings through 27 March 2025

== World Championship results ==
Year
| Year | Age | Slalom | Giant; Slalom | Super G | Downhill | Combined | Parallel | Team Event |
| 2013 | 17 | — | — | 62 | — | — | —N/a | — |
| 2015 | 19 | — | — | 45 | DNF | 36 | —N/a | — |
| 2017 | 21 | 30 | — | — | — | — | —N/a | — |
| 2019 | 23 | DNF1 | — | — | — | — | —N/a | — |
| 2021 | 25 | 6 | — | — | — | — | DNQ | — |
| 2023 | 27 | DNF2 | — | — | — | — | — | — |

== Olympic results ==
Year
| Year | Age | Slalom | Giant; Slalom | Super G | Downhill | Combined |
| 2018 | 22 | 21 | — | — | — | — |
| 2022 | 26 | — | — | — | — | — |
| 2026 | 30 | DNF1 | — | — | — | — |
