= Thomas Tumler =

Swiss alpine skier (born 1989)

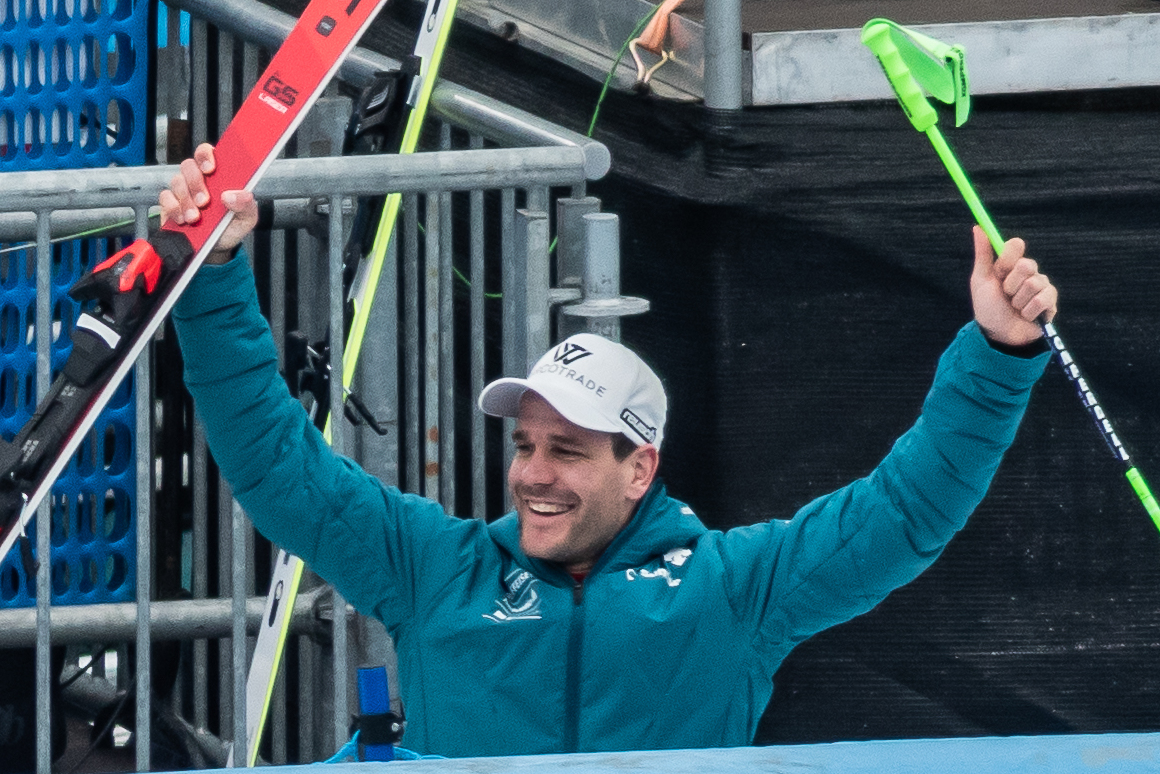
- At Soldeu in 2023

Personal information
- Nickname: Thomi
- Born: 5 November 1989 (age 36) Scuol, Graubünden, Switzerland
- Height: 1.80 m (5 ft 11 in)

Skiing career
- Country: Switzerland
- Sport: Alpine skiing ♂
- Club: Samnaun
- Disciplines: Giant slalom
- World Cup debut: 18 February 2012 (age 22)

Olympics
- Teams: 2 – (2018, 2026)
- Medals: 0

World Championships
- Teams: 3 – (2019, 2023, 2025)
- Medals: 2 (0 gold)

World Cup
- Seasons: 15 – (2012–2026)
- Wins: 1 – (1 GS)
- Podiums: 5 – (4 GS, 1 PG)
- Overall titles: 0 – (26th in 2025)
- Discipline titles: 0 – (6th in GS, 2025)
Medal record
Men's alpine skiing
Representing Switzerland
World Championships
Silver medal – second place	2025 Saalbach	Giant slalom
Silver medal – second place	2025 Saalbach	Team event

Thomas Tumler (born 5 November 1989) is a Swiss World Cup alpine ski racer; he specializes in giant slalom and formerly also competed in super-G.

Tumler participated in the 2018 Winter Olympics, and three World Championships.

== World Cup results ==
Tumler debuted in the World Cup in February 2012 in Bansko, Bulgaria, failing to finish the first run in a giant slalom race. His first points came at Kranjska Gora, Slovenia, finishing 26th in the same discipline. Over the next several seasons, Tumler also competed in super-G, reaching the top ten once, in eighth at St. Moritz in 2016, which was his first World cup top ten. He also started three downhill races; his best result was 33rd at Kvitfjell, Norway, also in 2016.

=== Season standings ===
Season
Season	Age	Overall	Giant slalom	Super-G	Parallel
2012	22	138	48	—	—N/a
2013	23	no World Cup points earned			—N/a
2014	24	123	43	—	—N/a
2015	25	100	49	32	—N/a
2016	26	73	—	21	—N/a
2017	27	139	—	46	—N/a
2018	28	80	—	23	—N/a
2019	29	49	18	28	—N/a
2020	30	69	41	28	4
2021	31	injured after 1 race, no points earned			
2022	32	104	32	42	—
2023	33	62	17	—	—N/a
2024	34	28	7	—	—N/a
2025	35	26	6	—	—N/a
2026	36	58	20	—	—N/a

=== Race podiums ===
- 1 win (1 GS)
- 5 podiums – (4 GS, 1 PG), 15 top tens

Season
Season	Date	Location	Discipline	Place
2019	2 December 2018	Beaver Creek, United States	Giant slalom	3rd
2020	9 February 2020	Chamonix, France	Parallel-G	2nd
2024	16 March 2024	Saalbach, Austria	Giant slalom	3rd
2025	8 December 2024	Beaver Creek, United States	Giant slalom	1st
2025	15 March 2025	Hafjell, Norway	Giant slalom	3rd

== World Championship results ==
Year
Year	Age	Slalom	Giant slalom	Super-G	Downhill	Combined	Team combined	Parallel	Team event
2019	29	—	DNF1	DNF	—	—	—N/a	—N/a	—
2023	33	—	18	—	—	—	—N/a	—	—
2025	35	—	2	—	—	—N/a	—	—N/a	2

== Olympic results ==
Year
Year	Age	Slalom	Giant slalom	Super-G	Downhill	Combined	Team combined	Team event
2018	28	—	—	26	—	—	—N/a	—
2026	36	—	4	—	—	—N/a	—	—N/a
