= Adrien Théaux =

French alpine skier (born 1984)

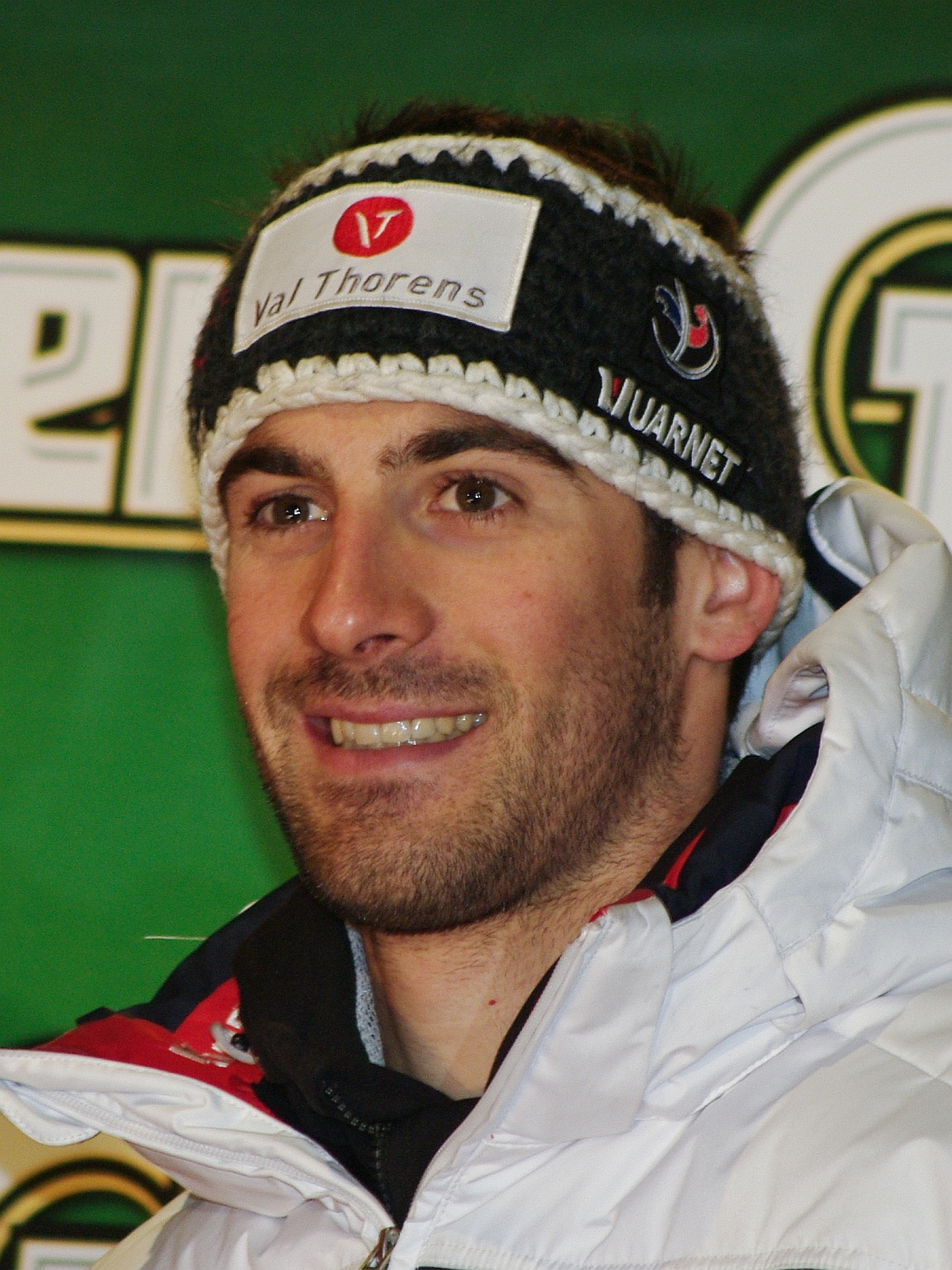
- Théaux in February 2011

Personal information
- Born: 18 September 1984 (age 42) Tarbes, Hautes-Pyrénées, France
- Height: 1.82 m (6 ft 0 in)
- Website: adrien-theaux.com

Skiing career
- Sport: Alpine skiing
- Club: EMHM Val Thorens
- Disciplines: Downhill, Super-G, Combined
- World Cup debut: 28 February 2004 (age 19)

Olympics
- Teams: 3 – (2010, 2014, 2018)
- Medals: 0

World Championships
- Teams: 9 – (2007–2019, 2023–2025)
- Medals: 1 (0 gold)

World Cup
- Seasons: 19 – (2004–2021, 2023)
- Wins: 3 – (3 DH)
- Podiums: 13 – (6 DH, 6 SG, 1 AC)
- Overall titles: 0 – (11th in 2016)
- Discipline titles: 0 – (5th in SG, 2013)
Medal record
Men's alpine skiing
Representing France
World Championships
Bronze medal – third place	2015 Beaver Creek	Super-G

Adrien Théaux (born 18 September 1984) is a French World Cup alpine ski racer and non-commissioned officer. He made his World Cup debut in February 2004 at age 19.

Théaux represented France at three Winter Olympics and seven World Championships; his best finish is a bronze medal in the Super-G in 2015 at Beaver Creek, Colorado.

Through December 2025, Théaux has three World Cup victories and thirteen podiums.

== World Cup results ==
=== Season standings ===
Season	Age	Overall	Slalom	Giant slalom	Super-G	Downhill	Combined
2006	21	115	—	—	—	—	31
2007	22	98	—	—	42	—	27
2008	23	61	—	—	43	27	26
2009	24	44	—	—	33	18	27
2010	25	28	—	41	16	27	19
2011	26	12	—	—	10	6	15
2012	27	14	—	—	9	11	8
2013	28	15	—	—	5	7	18
2014	29	16	—	—	16	10	13
2015	30	22	—	—	7	18	22
2016	31	11	—	—	7	7	6
2017	32	22	—	—	17	9	—
2018	33	18	—	—	10	9	—
2019	34	32	—	—	15	18	—
2020	35	47	—	—	21	19	—
2021	36	84	—	—	41	29	—N/a
2022	37						—N/a
2023	38	58	—	—	59	20	—N/a
2024	39	65	—	—	41	23	—N/a
2025	40	74	—	—	36	28	—N/a
2026	41	88	—	—	—	26	—N/a

Standings through 20 January 2026

=== Race podiums ===
- 3 wins – (3 DH)
- 13 podiums – (6 DH, 6 SG, 1 AC), 78 top tens

Season	Date	Location	Discipline	Place
2011	4 Dec 2010	(United States) Beaver Creek, USA	Super-G	2nd
2011	22 Jan 2011	Kitzbühel, Austria	Downhill	3rd
2011	16 Mar 2011	Lenzerheide, Switzerland	Downhill	1st
2012	27 Nov 2011	Lake Louise, Canada	Super-G	3rd
2012	11 Feb 2012	Sochi, Russia	Downhill	3rd
2012	25 Feb 2012	Crans-Montana, Switzerland	Super-G	2nd
2013	25 Nov 2012	Lake Louise, Canada	Super-G	2nd
2013	2 Mar 2013	Kvitfjell, Norway	Downhill	1st
2014	30 Nov 2013	Lake Louise, Canada	Downhill	3rd
2014	20 Dec 2013	Val Gardena, Italy	Super-G	3rd
2015	22 Feb 2015	Saalbach, Austria	Super-G	2nd
2016	29 Dec 2015	Santa Caterina, Italy	Downhill	1st
2016	15 Jan 2016	Wengen, Switzerland	Combined	3rd

== World Championship results ==
Year	Age	Slalom	Giant slalom	Super-G	Downhill	Combined	Team Combined
2007	22	—	—	26	—	23	—N/a
2009	24	—	—	21	5	DNF2	—N/a
2011	26	—	—	10	DNF	—	—N/a
2013	28	—	—	9	10	DNF2	—N/a
2015	30	—	—	3	8	—	—N/a
2017	32	—	—	16	27	9	—N/a
2019	34	—	—	5	15	—	—N/a
2023	38	—	—	—	34	—	—N/a
2025	40	—	—	—	32	—N/a	—

== Olympic results ==
Year	Age	Slalom	Giant slalom	Super-G	Downhill	Combined
2010	25	—	—	13	16	12
2014	29	—	—	11	18	17
2018	33	—	—	15	26	—
