= Victor Muffat-Jeandet =

French alpine skier (born 1989)

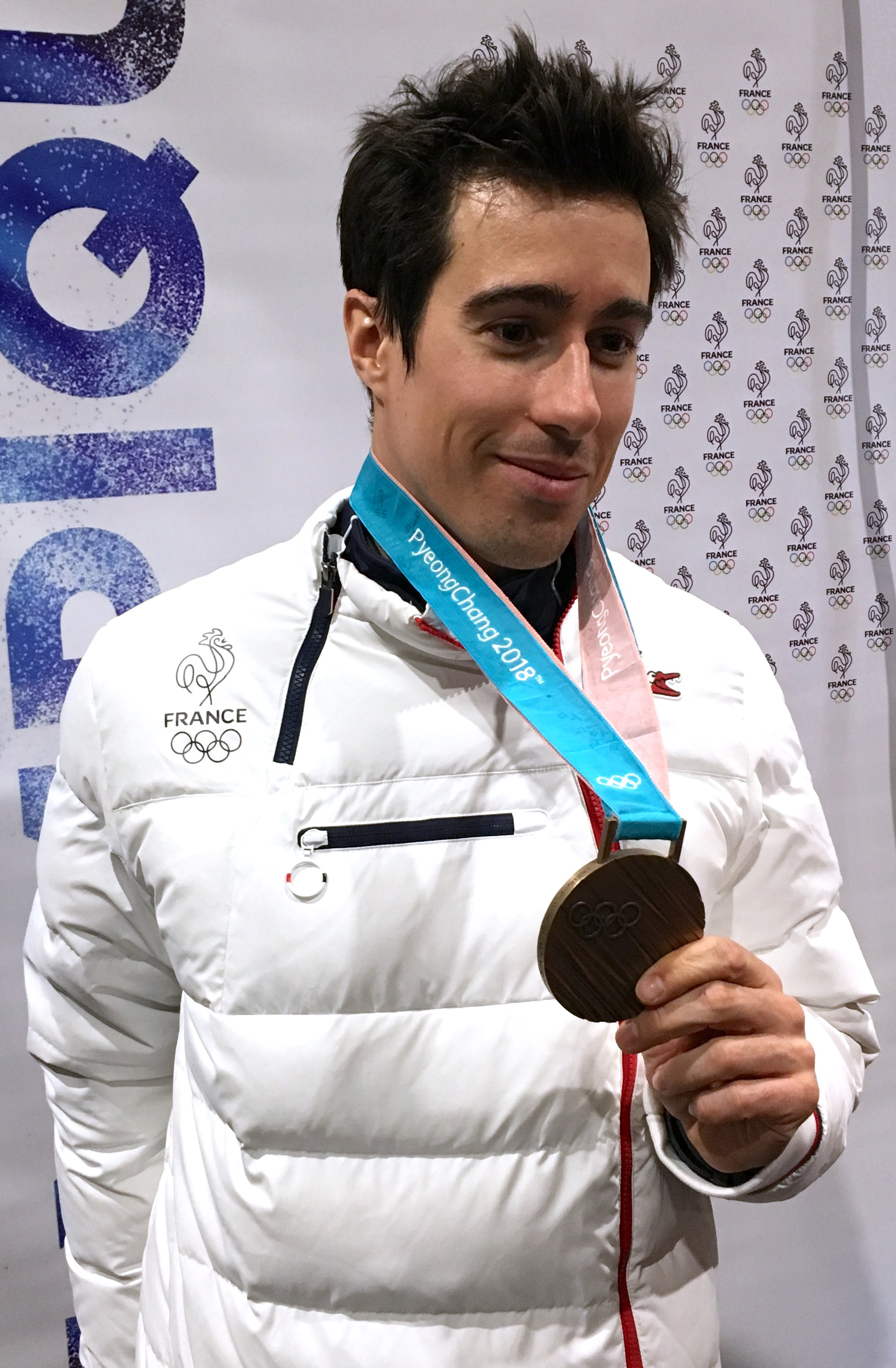
- Olympic bronze in 2018

Personal information
- Born: 5 March 1989 (age 37) Aix-les-Bains, Savoie, France

Skiing career
- Country: France
- Sport: Alpine skiing
- Club: S.C. Bonneval
- Disciplines: Giant slalom, combined, slalom
- World Cup debut: 28 February 2009 (age 19)

Olympics
- Teams: 1 – (2018)
- Medals: 1 (0 gold)

World Championships
- Teams: 6 – (2013–2021, 2025)
- Medals: 0

World Cup
- Seasons: 18 – (2009–2026)
- Wins: 1 – (1 AC)
- Podiums: 11 – (5 GS, 1 SL, 5 AC)
- Overall titles: 0 – (12th in 2015, 2016)
- Discipline titles: 0 – (3rd in AC: 2015, 2018)
Medal record
Men's alpine skiing
Representing France
Olympic Games
Bronze medal – third place	2018 Pyeongchang	Combined

Victor Muffat-Jeandet (born 5 March 1989) is a French World Cup alpine ski racer.

== Career ==
Born in Aix-les-Bains, Savoie, Muffat-Jeandet made his World Cup debut in February 2009 in Kranjska Gora, Slovenia. He achieved his first podium in 2015, a runner-up finish in a super combined at Wengen, Switzerland; his first win came three years later at the same race.

At the World Championships, Muffat-Jeandet finished 26th in the slalom in 2013 and 7th in the giant slalom in 2015.

On his Olympic Games debut in PyeongChang, he earned his first medal, a bronze, in the combined and followed that result with two sixth places in the giant slalom and slalom.

== World Cup results ==
=== Season standings ===
Season
Season	Age	Overall	Slalom	Giant slalom	Super-G	Downhill	Combined
2013	23	67	40	29	—	—	22
2014	24	55	49	20	—	—	—
2015	25	12	14	7	—	—	3
2016	26	12	18	5	48	—	5
2017	27	27	27	12	48	—	9
2018	28	14	15	10	—	—	3
2019	29	18	15	12	44	—	5
2020	30	15	15	10	58	—	6
2021	31	17	10	27	—	—	—N/a
2022	32	80	41	26	—	—	—N/a
2023	33	76	46	26	—	—	—N/a
2024	34	99	—	33	—	—	—N/a
2025	35	51	19	53	—	—	—N/a
2026	36	37	15	—	—	—	—N/a

=== Race podiums ===
- 1 win – (1 AC)
- 11 podiums – (5 GS, 1 SL, 5 AC); 56 top tens

Season
Season	Date	Location	Discipline	Place
2015	16 January 2015	Wengen, Switzerland	Combined	2nd
2016	6 December 2015	Beaver Creek, United States	Giant slalom	2nd
2016	12 December 2015	Val d'Isère, France	Giant slalom	3rd
2016	20 December 2015	Alta Badia, Italy	Giant slalom	3rd
2016	22 January 2016	Kitzbühel, Austria	Combined	2nd
2018	12 January 2018	Wengen, Switzerland	Combined	1st
2018	17 March 2018	Åre, Sweden	Giant slalom	3rd
2019	18 January 2019	Wengen, Switzerland	Combined	2nd
2020	11 January 2020	Adelboden, Switzerland	Giant slalom	3rd
2020	17 January 2020	Wengen, Switzerland	Combined	3rd
2021	14 March 2021	Kranjska Gora, Slovenia	Slalom	2nd

== World Championships results ==
Year
Year	Age	Slalom	Giant slalom	Super-G	Downhill	Combined	Team combined
2013	23	26	—	—	—	—	—N/a
2015	25	DNS2	7	—	—	DNF1	—N/a
2017	27	17	13	—	—	20	—N/a
2019	29	16	14	—	—	6	—N/a
2021	31	DNF1	13	—	—	6	—N/a
2025	35	17	—	—	—	—N/a	10

== Olympic results ==
Year
Year	Age	Slalom	Giant slalom	Super-G	Downhill	Combined
2018	28	6	6	—	—	3
