= 2026 Alpine Skiing World Cup – Men's overall =

Alpine ski discipline year standings

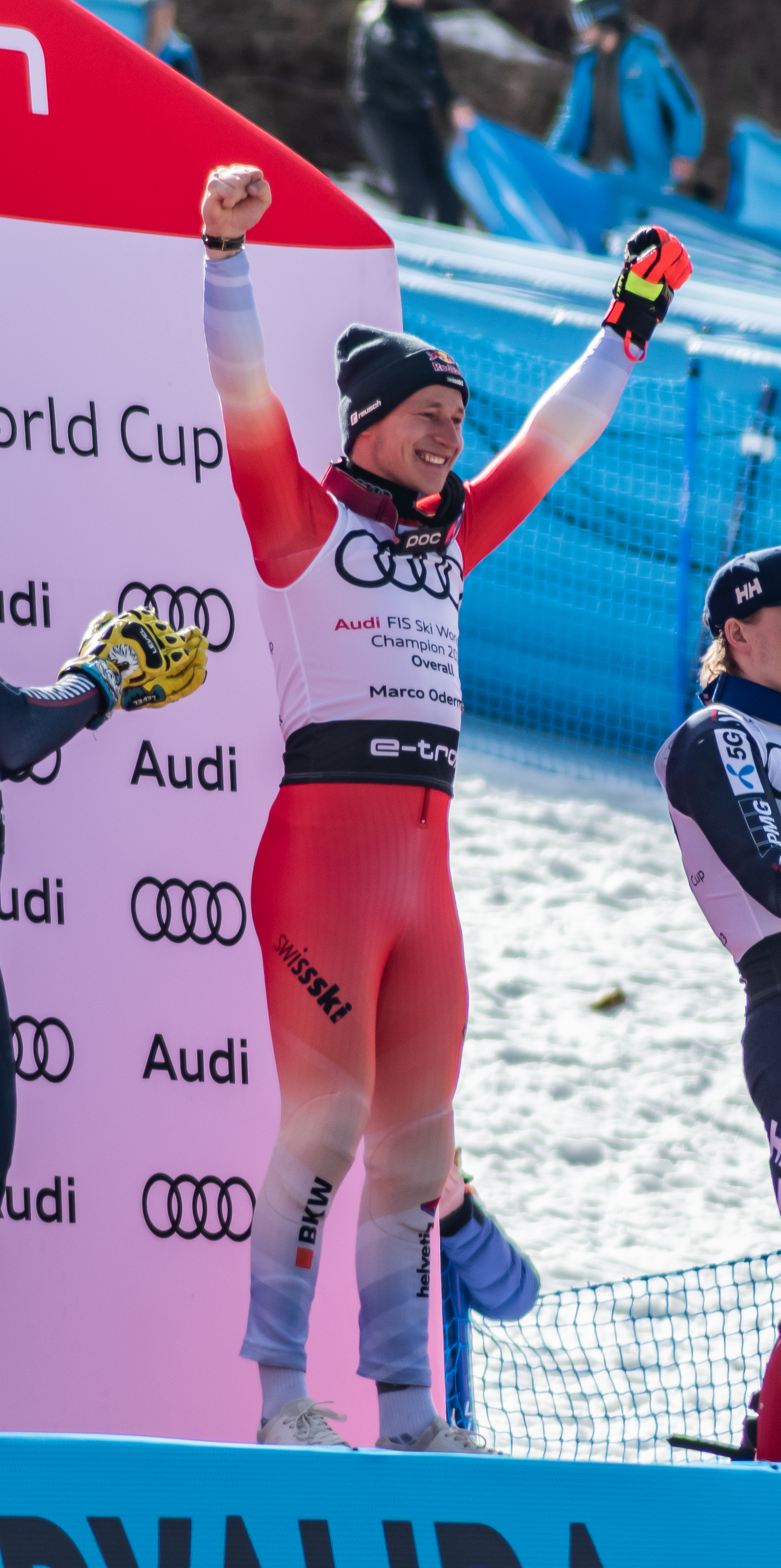
2026 Men's Overall World Cup: Marco Odermatt of Switzerland, season champion for the fifth straight time; 2026 Men's World Cup; Overall • Downhill • Super-G; Giant slalom • Slalom
| Previous: 2025 | Next: 2027 |

The men's overall in the 2026 FIS Alpine Skiing World Cup was scheduled to consist of 38 events in four disciplines: downhill (DH) (9 races), super-G (SG) (9 races), giant slalom (GS) (9 races), and slalom (SL) (11 races). During the season, as described below, two super-Gs had to be canceled due to heavy snowfall and high winds, reducing the number of super-Gs to 7 and the total number of events to 36.

A tentative schedule was circulated on 12 May 2025 following the FIS Alpine Spring Meeting in Vilamoura, Portugal. The initial schedule was released on 12 June 2025 and featured events at 19 different resorts, beginning with the traditional opener: a giant slalom on the Rettenbach ski course, located on the Rettenbach glacier in Sölden, Austria, on 26 October 2025. The schedule was subject to amendment or revision even throughout the season due to local weather conditions. Also, for the fourth straight season, neither the combined discipline nor the parallel discipline were contested on the Alpine skiing World Cup circuit, and both disciplines are considered to be terminated until further notice; in fact, the individual combined was replaced at the 2026 Winter Olympics by the debut of the "team combined", in which two different racers compete for their national team in the speed (downhill) and technical (slalom) portions of the competition.

In 2025, Swiss three-event star Marco Odermatt easily won his fourth consecutive overall World Cup title, along with the downhill, super-G, and giant slalom disciplines, giving him crystal globes in all four disciplines for the second straight year, and he went into the 2026 season as a huge favorite to repeat once again—and he did. Headed into the 2026 finals, Odermatt had already clinched the overall, downhill, and super-G globes, with only the giant slalom and slalom (in which Odermatt does not compete) still in doubt.

As is the case every fourth year, the 2026 Winter Olympics (referred to as "Milan Cortina 2026") were conducted during the season, this time in three regions in Italy – Milan, the Stelvio Pass, and Cortina d'Ampezzo – during 6–22 February 2026. All of the Alpine skiing events for men took place on the classic Stelvio course at Bormio.

== Season summary ==
=== Opening months (October 2025 to Christmas) ===
Although the first race of the World Cup season, a giant slalom at Sölden in October, went to four-time defending discipline champion Marco Odermatt, as expected, the race saw a long-delayed restart to the "Battle of the Marcos", as both heats were tight battles between Odermatt and Austrian former slalom champion Marco Schwarz, finally returning to form after a catastrophic injury almost two years ago (when Schwarz was narrowly leading Odermatt for the overall World Cup title). The next race, the opening slalom of the season in Levi in November, produced the first World Cup victory ever for Brazil, by 2023 World Cup slalom champion Lucas Pinheiro Braathen, who then skied for his native Norway before transferring to his mother's homeland of Brazil in 2025 after a one-year retirement. At the same time, eight-time men's overall World Cup champion Marcel Hirscher, who won all of those championships while skiing for Austria before transferring to the Netherlands after a six-year retirement, announced that his return to the World Cup circuit from his season-ending injury in December 2024 would not take place until January 2026. A week later, in another slalom in Gurgl, Austria, France's Paco Rassat, who had finished a career-best sixth the week before, came from 14th place on his second run to earn his first World Cup victory in his first World Cup podium finish, which gave him the lead in both the discipline and the overall World Cup standings.

The World Cup races for both men and women then moved to the Western Hemisphere for the next two weeks, with the first two races, a super-G and a giant slalom, taking place at Copper Mountain (U.S.), which hadn't hosted the World Cup since 2001. The super-G came down to a two-man battle, but defending discipline champion Marco Odermatt of Switzerland edged Austria's Vincent Kriechmayr by .08 seconds for the victory, in a race that was also noted for the return after almost two years (from a life-threatening injury suffered in January 2024) of 2020 World Cup overall champion Aleksander Aamodt Kilde of Norway, who is also the fiancé of American star Mikaela Shiffrin, and Shiffrin was present at the finish line to greet him. However, in the giant slalom, Odermatt went off course and failed to finish the first run, which led to an upset first World Cup victory by Austria's Stefan Brennsteiner (who drew the #1 starting position in the first run), although Odermatt continued to hold the overall lead by 34 points over Schwarz, who finished fourth.

The start of the downhill season at Beaver Creek ran into scheduling problems, as high winds and a large impending weekend snowstorm led to (1) the cancellation of one of the two downhills scheduled there and (2) the date of the second one being moved up to the planned date of the first one (4 December); the cancelled race was added as a second downhill at Val Gardena (Italy) two weeks later. The contested downhill at Beaver Creek was then won by defending discipline champion Odermatt, who defeated American Ryan Cochran-Siegle by 0.3 seconds. The super-G the next day battled high winds and fresh snow, and a crash by Switzerland's Franjo von Allmen, starting 14th, led to a delay, after which none of the later runners were able to crack the top ten, and the weather conditions led to the race being stopped after 31 racers had gone; the winner was Kriechmayr, who had started sixth and defeated the field (except for one other racer) by over a second. The third race at Beaver Creek two days later (and final race in the U.S. for the 2026 season) was a giant slalom, and Odermatt returned to form with his second win in the three-race series there (and his fifth overall at Beaver Creek, but his first GS there), thus increasing his overall lead.

Returning to Europe the next week at Val d'Isère (France0 for two technical races, the Swiss team swept the podium in the giant slalom; the winner was Loïc Meillard, who came from fifth to earn the victory, while Odermatt (who placed third) regained the outright GS discipline lead. The next day, slalom resumed, and Norway's Timon Haugan, who had failed to podium the day before after being in third following the first run, held off Loïc Meillard of Switzerland, the previous day's winner, to become the third different winner in the discipline this season and take over the discipline lead. Moving on to the first of the three speed races now at Val Gardena, overcast conditions led to the downhill being shortened and still needing almost four hours to complete due to the delays caused by fog, but Odermatt won again for his 50th overall World Cup victory, edging his compatriot Franjo von Allmen and tying Alberto Tomba (Italy) for third all-time among World Cup men, with only Ingmar Stenmark (Sweden) (86 wins), Hirscher (Austria/Netherlands) (67), and Hermann Maier (Austria) (54) still ahead of him. The next day, continuing fog in the morning followed an unusual late weather shift allowed the later racers to have clear visibility and led to the first victory ever on the World Cup circuit for a male Czech skier – Jan Zabystřan, who started 29th. Odermatt, the only skier among the first ten starters to finish in the top ten, was second and regained the discipline lead, thus once again giving him the lead in each of his three disciplines. The next day, the results were flipped in the second downhill, with von Allmen edging Odermatt in a full-length downhill, as Odermatt's overall lead mushroomed to over 450 points (765–302) over runner-up Henrik Kristoffersen of Norway.

A day later, the men were in nearby Alta Badia for the last two races, both technical, before Christmas. And Marco Schwarz finally returned to the top step of the podium for the first time in two full years (22 December 2023, in slalom, his last completed race prior to his injury), building a dominating lead on the first giant slalom run and then holding off Braathen on the second. Finally, in the last World Cup race before Christmas, the aptly-named Clément Noël of France held the slalom lead after the first run, but Norway's Atle Lie McGrath passed him on the second for the victory, thus denying Noël a holiday-appropriate win, with Schwarz being disqualified on the second run while seeking a back-to-back win and McGrath's teammate Haugan (fourth) moving into second place overall behind Odermatt (although still over 400 points behind).

=== Midseason (Christmas to Winter Olympics) ===
Two days after Christmas, in the last race in the 2025 calendar year (which was also the first World Cup race ever at Livigno, Italy), a potential all-Swiss podium (Alexis Monney, von Allmen, and Odermatt) was broken up by a (relatively narrow) first ever super-G victory for Austria's Schwarz, who had won the giant slalom just six days prior at Alta Badia; the victory moved him ahead of Haugan and into second place overall behind Odermatt. Returning from the New Year's break, the men began a series of five slaloms in five weeks with a night slalom in Madonna di Campiglio, Italy, which this time was won by Noël, who came from behind to edge Finland's Eduard Hallberg and thus trail Haugen by only three points for the discipline lead. The next week, in the first of two technical races (a GS) at Adelboden, Switzerland, Odermatt built a half-second lead over Braathen on the first run and matched Braathen's time on the second, taking both the win (his fifth straight in the GS there) and the discipline lead, once again restoring him to the lead in all three of his disciplines. The next day, France's Rassat claimed his second victory of the season in the slalom, edging out two Norwegians (McGrath and Henrik Kristoffersen) for the win – with Braathen, who finished fourth, taking over second place overall behind Odermatt.

The next two weeks featured the two classics, the Lauberhorn ski races at Wengen, Switzerland and the Hahnenkamm Races in Kitzbühel, Austria, with each week including a downhill, a Super-G, and a slalom. As usual, the Wengen races came first, and the first race, the super-G, took place in bright sunshine, which led to melting snow, and the first racer down the course – Giovanni Franzoni of Italy – set the fastest time for his first World Cup win, with the other two podium finishers starting 4th (Stefan Babinsky of Austria, his first World Cup podium) and 8th (von Allmen) as the conditions continued to deteriorate. The next day, the downhill was run on a shortened course due to high winds, but Odermatt dominated to win his fourth straight downhill at Wengen, with Kriechmayr (0.79 sec) his closest challenger and Franzoni (0.9 sec) claiming third, thereby increasing Odermatt's overall lead to over 550 points. In the third race, McGrath repeated his slalom victory there from 2025, beating his good friend (with birthdays only two days apart) and former Norwegian teammate Braathen by almost half a second, which propelled him into third overall, behind Odermatt and Braathen. The following weekend at Kitzbühel, the super-G was again run first, and Odermatt barely edged his teammate von Allmen by 0.03 seconds for his 53rd career World Cup win, in what turned out to be a close race all the way down to Franzoni in 12th, just 0.66 seconds behind Odermatt. But Franzoni got revenge the next day in the legendary downhill, edging Odermatt by 0.07 to win, and then dedicating the victory to his late friend and teammate – and roommate at Kitzbühel last year – Matteo Franzoso, who was killed in a training crash in Chile in September 2025,>| Finally, in the slalom, the home country's Manuel Feller came from fourth after the first run to overtake leader Loïc Meillard and save Austrian honor for the weekend.

Two days after Kitzbühel, and less than two weeks before the Winter Olympics, came two nighttime technical races under the lights at nearby Schladming. The giant slalom featured a neck-and-neck first run between Meillard and Braathen, only for Meillard to win the second run by about three-quarters of a second over Braathen for his second victory of the year; Odermatt's fourth place left him with a lead of 103 points over Braathen, his closest pursuer, with only two more races in the discipline after the Olympics. The next night's slalom turned into an all-Norwegian battle between McGrath and Kristoffersen, with last year's discipline champion Kristoffersen coming from behind on the second run to claim his first victory of the season, while McGrath grabbed a one-point lead over Braathen in the discipline race. Finally, in the last race before the Olympics, von Allmen dominated the downhill at Crans Montana, Switzerland, defeating runner-up Dominik Paris of Italy by about two-thirds of a second for his second straight victory on the course.

==== Milan Cortina 2026 ====
Just before the first downhill practice run at the Olympics, Aleksander Aamodt Kilde announced that he would not compete again until next season due to continuing back problems. In the Olympic downhill, the Swiss got into position for an unprecedented podium sweep, with von Allmen in first by 0.7 second, followed by Odermatt and Monney. But the later-running Italians Franzoni and Paris (known as the "King of Bormio" for his seven victories there) both fed off the support from the home crowd and squeezed in between von Allmen and Odermatt, knocking Odermatt off the podium but retaining von Allmen as the fifth Swiss winner of the Olympic men's downhill (after Bernhard Russi, Pirmin Zurbriggen, Didier Defago, and Beat Feuz). Two days later, in the Olympic debut of the new "team combined" event, which features a downhill and a slalom skier from the same nation racing as a team, von Allmen became the first double gold medalist of the Olympics when he and slalom-skiing teammate Tanguy Nef (who has never reached a World Cup podium but who is familiar with the pressures of team racing from his college years at Dartmouth College in the U.S.) blew away the field by 0.99 seconds to win the event, with the second Swiss team of Odermatt and Meillard and the Austrian team of Kriechmayr and Feller tying for the silver. In the super-G, von Allman once again came out on top, winning the gold medal (his third, making him the first Swiss winner of this event and tying the Olympic record for golds in one Olympics in men's skiing that was held jointly by Jean-Claude Killy of France (1968) and Toni Sailer of Austria (1956)), after three straight podiums in super-G without a victory, with discipline leader Odermatt picking up bronze and the 2022 silver medalist, Ryan Cochran-Siegle of the U.S., earning a second silver (in just his third podium in all events this season).

In the first technical event, the giant slalom, Braathen raced down the hill as the first starter and, at the end of the first run, held a 0.95 second lead over Odermatt, followed by two more Swiss (Meillard and Thomas Tumler), and—despite the fact that the Swiss coach got the right to set the course in the second run—Braathen lost less than half of that lead on the second run to earn the gold for Brazil's (and South America's) first Winter Olympic medal ever, with Odermatt silver (his third medal of the games) and Meillard bronze (his second). Finally, the first run of the slalom started in a light snowfall, which quickly turned into a blizzard with low visibility, allowing McGrath, the first skier, to build a lead of 0.59 over Meillard, the second skier, who built another 0.35 over the next-best skier, Fabio Gstrein of Austria, with only seven skiers within two seconds of McGrath's lead and 11 of the top 30 and 49 out of 96 total failing to finish the run; however, McGrath straddled a gate and skied out early in the (clear) second run, allowing Meillard to complete his set of Olympic medals at these games with a gold medal (to join his silver from the team combined and his bronze from the giant slalom), and also becoming the third Swiss male skier with three medals (joining von Allmen (three golds) and Odermatt (two silvers and a bronze)), giving the Swiss men four of the five golds. Gstrein, who matched Meillard for the best second-run time, won the silver for the Austrian men's team's second medal of the games (and his first), and Kristoffersen, who posted the third-best second-run time, took the bronze for his second career Olympic medal.

=== The late season (post-Olympics to finals) ===
In the first post-Olympic race, a downhill at Garmisch-Partenkirchen (Germany), Odermatt led a Swiss sweep of the podium, edging Monney by .04 seconds for his fourth downhill win of the season and leaving him 687 points up on Braathen with just nine races remaining in the season. The next day, the super-G at Garmisch was cancelled due to persistent fog, which affected the course even after the start gate was lowered, and was rescheduled for 13 March at Courchevel (France), to precede the downhill and super-G already scheduled there on 14–15 March. The first giant slalom after the Olympics, in Kranjska Gora (Slovenia), had a very similar result to the Olympic race, with Braathen holding a large lead over two Swiss (Meillard and Brennsteiner) after the first run and maintaining it, allowing him to close within 48 points of Odermatt (who was fifth) for the discipline title, with just the finals remaining. In the slalom, Olympic champion Meillard skied out on the first run, while McGrath barely managed to hold on to his first-run lead for a victory on the melting mountainside (with temperatures in the 50s on the second run), edging his teammate Kristoffersen by .01 seconds and his childhood friend Braathen by .04 seconds, thus giving McGrath a 41-point lead over Braathen heading into the discipline finals.

In the first race (a downhill) of the last weekend before the finals, at Courchevel (France), Odermatt, who was third, thus clinched both the discipline title (with an over-200 point lead with one race left)) and the overall title (with an over-600 point lead with six races left), his fifth straight (leaving him second, behind only Marcel Hirscher (eight) among male World Cup racers); in the race itself, Kriechmayr edged Franzoni to become the first Austrian to win a downhill since Kriechmayr last did it three years prior (15 March 2023). However, the rescheduled super-G the next day had to be canceled due to continuing heavy snowfall and fog, and this time it was not rescheduled and thus canceled. Then the second super-G, which was to take place the next day, also had to be canceled after the snowfall continued overnight until after 6 AM, which left the course with a powder covering of dead snow that was unsuitable for racing, thus giving Odermatt the super-G discipline title for the fourth straight season.

== Finals ==
The finals in all disciplines will be held from 21 to 25 March 2026 in Lillehammer, Norway; the speed events will be held on the Olympiabakken course at Kvitfjell, and the technical events will be held on the Olympialøypa course at Hafjell. Only the top 25 skiers in each World Cup discipline and the winner of the Junior World Championship in the discipline, plus any skiers who have scored at least 500 points in the World Cup overall classification for the season, will be eligible to compete in the final, and only the top 15 finishers will earn World Cup points. Heading into the finals, only ten individuals had scored at least 500 points overall. In the downhill, Paris managed to reverse his results vis-à-vis von Allmen from Crans Montana in February, this time edging von Allmen by .19 seconds for his first race win of the season, which enabled Paris to place third in the discipline for the season behind Odermatt and von Allmen. The next day in the super-G, Paris continued Italy's dominance at finals, edging Kriechmayr by .07 seconds to capture the speed double at finals (giving Italy all four wins in both the men's and women's speed races), although Kriechmayr finished second for the season behind Odermatt and his teammate Raphael Haaser, who was third on the day, was also third for the season. Moving to the technical races, in the first run of the giant slalom, Odermatt struggled on the soft snow and failed to finish, meaning that either Braathen or Meillard (who were in the top three after the first run, with Braathen leading) would win the season title in the discipline (after four straight wins by Odermatt) if he won the race; they both rose to the occasion, with Meillard holding the lead with just Braathen to go, but Braathen's second run gave him the title by over half a second, with Odermatt second and Meillard third for the season. By the final event at finals, the home country's lack of success during these finals had become a storyline but was decisively ended by the slalom results; first, Norway's Haugan, who had defeated Meillard at Val d'Isère in December, did it again at finals for his second win of the season, giving the fans a home race winner. Then, the overall season-long battle between Norway's McGrath, his close friend (and former Norwegian) Braathen (41 points behind), and France's Noël (77 points behind), which would have been over had McGrath placed no worse then third at finals, instead accelerated when McGrath had a poor second run, creating an opening for Braathen, who failed to take advantage of it by skiing out early in his own second run, while Noël, who then needed a victory to have a shot, instead struggled near the end of his second run, thus allowing McGrath (who ended up eighth) to claim the title, giving the fans a home crystal globe winner as well.

== Standings ==
| # | Skier | DH; 9 races | SG; 7 races | GS; 9 races | SL; 11 races | Total |
| | (Switzerland) Marco Odermatt | 706 | 425 | 495 | 0 | 1626 |
| 2 | (Brazil) Lucas Pinheiro Braathen | 0 | 0 | 547 | 511 | 1058 |
| 3 | (Norway) Atle Lie McGrath | 0 | 22 | 330 | 584 | 936 |
| 4 | (Switzerland) Loïc Meillard | 0 | 45 | 486 | 392 | 923 |
| 5 | (Norway) Henrik Kristoffersen | 0 | 0 | 318 | 503 | 821 |
| 6 | (Norway) Timon Haugan | 0 | 0 | 277 | 499 | 776 |
| 7 | (Switzerland) Franjo von Allmen | 515 | 255 | 0 | 0 | 770 |
| 8 | (Austria) Vincent Kriechmayr | 382 | 347 | 2 | 0 | 731 |
| 9 | (Italy) Dominik Paris | 441 | 257 | 0 | 0 | 698 |
| 10 | (Italy) Giovanni Franzoni | 378 | 285 | 0 | 0 | 663 |
| 11 | (Austria) Marco Schwarz | 2 | 183 | 339 | 89 | 613 |
| 12 | (Austria) Raphael Haaser | 96 | 301 | 134 | 0 | 531 |
| 13 | (France) Clément Noël | 0 | 0 | 0 | 520 | 520 |
| 14 | (Switzerland) Alexis Monney | 259 | 189 | 0 | 0 | 448 |
| 15 | (Switzerland) Stefan Rogentin | 207 | 240 | 0 | 0 | 447 |
| 16 | (Austria) Stefan Brennsteiner | 0 | 0 | 431 | 0 | 431 |
| 17 | (France) Paco Rassat | 0 | 0 | 0 | 387 | 387 |
| 18 | (Italy) Alex Vinatzer | 0 | 0 | 224 | 161 | 385 |
| 19 | (France) Nils Allègre | 228 | 147 | 0 | 0 | 375 |
| 20 | (United States) Ryan Cochran-Siegle | 214 | 128 | 0 | 0 | 342 |
| 21 | (Finland) Eduard Hallberg | 0 | 0 | 0 | 339 | 339 |
| 22 | (Italy) Mattia Casse | 163 | 139 | 0 | 0 | 302 |
| 23 | (Austria) Stefan Babinsky | 57 | 243 | 0 | 0 | 300 |
| 24 | (Italy) Florian Schieder | 277 | 22 | 0 | 0 | 299 |
| 25 | (Switzerland) Tanguy Nef | 0 | 0 | 0 | 280 | 280 |
| 26 | (Austria) Daniel Hemetsberger | 161 | 113 | 0 | 0 | 274 |
| 27 | (Norway) Adrian Smiseth Sejersted | 139 | 125 | 0 | 0 | 264 |
| 28 | (United States) River Radamus | 0 | 54 | 207 | 0 | 261 |
| 29 | (Austria) Manuel Feller | 0 | 0 | 0 | 247 | 247 |
| 29 | (Norway) Eirik Hystad Solberg | 0 | 0 | 57 | 190 | 247 |
| 31 | (Germany) Linus Straßer | 0 | 0 | 0 | 238 | 238 |
| 32 | (Belgium) Sam Maes | 0 | 0 | 189 | 38 | 227 |
| 33 | (Austria) Michael Matt | 0 | 0 | 0 | 224 | 224 |
| 34 | (Belgium) Armand Marchant | 0 | 0 | 0 | 207 | 207 |
| 35 | (Canada) Cameron Alexander | 144 | 61 | 0 | 0 | 205 |
| 36 | (Austria) Fabio Gstrein | 0 | 0 | 0 | 201 | 201 |
| 37 | (Germany) Fabian Gratz | 0 | 0 | 194 | 0 | 194 |
| 37 | (France) Victor Muffat-Jeandet | 0 | 0 | 0 | 194 | 194 |
| 39 | (Croatia) Filip Zubčić | 0 | 0 | 131 | 60 | 191 |
| 40 | (Slovenia) Miha Hrobat | 151 | 31 | 0 | 0 | 182 |
| 41 | (Austria) Joshua Sturm | 0 | 0 | 101 | 78 | 179 |
| 42 | (Switzerland) Luca Aerni | 0 | 0 | 177 | 0 | 177 |
| 43 | (France) Steven Amiez | 0 | 0 | 0 | 174 | 174 |
| 44 | (France) Léo Anguenot | 0 | 0 | 172 | 0 | 172 |
| 45 | (Italy) Christof Innerhofer | 84 | 86 | 0 | 0 | 170 |
| 46 | (Norway) Fredrik Møller | 1 | 168 | 0 | 0 | 169 |
| 46 | (Slovenia) Žan Kranjec | 0 | 0 | 169 | 0 | 169 |
| 48 | (Czech Republic) Jan Zabystřan | 5 | 163 | 0 | 0 | 168 |
| 49 | (France) Alban Elezi Cannaferina | 26 | 35 | 103 | 0 | 164 |
| 50 | (Italy) Benjamin Alliod | 139 | 23 | 0 | 0 | 162 |
| 51 | (France) Maxence Muzaton | 156 | 0 | 0 | 0 | 156 |
| 52 | (France) Alexis Pinturault | 0 | 0 | 148 | 0 | 148 |
| 53 | (Switzerland) Justin Murisier | 115 | 27 | 0 | 0 | 142 |
| 54 | (Germany) Anton Grammel | 0 | 0 | 139 | 0 | 139 |
| 54 | (Italy) Tommaso Sala | 0 | 0 | 0 | 139 | 139 |
| 56 | (Austria) Lukas Feurstein | 0 | 90 | 38 | 0 | 128 |
| 57 | (Switzerland) Daniel Yule | 0 | 0 | 0 | 126 | 126 |
| 58 | (Switzerland) Thomas Tumler | 0 | 0 | 125 | 0 | 125 |
| 59 | (Switzerland) Niels Hintermann | 123 | 0 | 0 | 0 | 123 |
| 60 | (Switzerland) Alessio Miggiano | 110 | 10 | 0 | 0 | 120 |
| 61 | (Germany) Simon Jocher | 38 | 80 | 0 | 0 | 118 |
| 62 | (France) Nils Alphand | 95 | 20 | 0 | 0 | 115 |
| 63 | (United Kingdom) Laurie Taylor | 0 | 0 | 0 | 112 | 112 |
| 63 | (Italy) Guglielmo Bosca | 16 | 96 | 0 | 0 | 112 |
| 65 | (Norway) Oscar Andreas Sandvik | 0 | 0 | 16 | 95 | 111 |
| 66 | (Bulgaria) Albert Popov | 0 | 0 | 0 | 106 | 106 |
| 67 | (Canada) James Crawford | 32 | 72 | 0 | 0 | 104 |
| 68 | (Sweden) Fabian Ax Swartz | 0 | 0 | 32 | 71 | 103 |
| 69 | (France) Thibaut Favrot | 0 | 0 | 101 | 0 | 101 |
| 70 | (Austria) Dominik Raschner | 0 | 0 | 0 | 94 | 94 |
| 70 | (Croatia) Samuel Kolega | 0 | 0 | 0 | 94 | 94 |
| 72 | (United States) Kyle Negomir | 45 | 46 | 0 | 0 | 91 |
| 73 | (Austria) Patrick Feurstein | 0 | 0 | 90 | 0 | 90 |
| 74 | (United Kingdom) Dave Ryding | 0 | 0 | 0 | 89 | 89 |
| 74 | (Finland) Elian Lehto | 83 | 6 | 0 | 0 | 89 |
| 76 | (Switzerland) Marco Kohler | 51 | 37 | 0 | 0 | 88 |
| 77 | (France) Matthieu Bailet | 16 | 71 | 0 | 0 | 87 |
| 78 | (Germany) Jonas Stockinger | 0 | 0 | 86 | 0 | 86 |
| 79 | (Austria) Stefan Eichberger | 36 | 40 | 0 | 0 | 76 |
| 80 | (Norway) Hans Grahl-Madsen | 0 | 0 | 0 | 72 | 72 |
| 81 | (Switzerland) Matthias Iten | 0 | 0 | 0 | 70 | 70 |
| 81 | (Slovenia) Martin Čater | 70 | 0 | 0 | 0 | 70 |
| 83 | (Andorra) Joan Verdú | 0 | 0 | 60 | 0 | 60 |
| 84 | (Switzerland) Lars Rösti | 59 | 0 | 0 | 0 | 59 |
| 84 | (Germany) Alexander Schmid | 0 | 0 | 59 | 0 | 59 |
| 86 | (Germany) Luis Vogt | 57 | 0 | 0 | 0 | 57 |
| 86 | (France) Blaise Giezendanner | 46 | 11 | 0 | 0 | 57 |
| 88 | (Austria) Johannes Strolz | 0 | 0 | 0 | 55 | 55 |
| 89 | (Sweden) Felix Monsén | 54 | 0 | 0 | 0 | 54 |
| 90 | (Canada) Brodie Seger | 20 | 31 | 0 | 0 | 51 |
| 91 | (Italy) Giovanni Borsotti | 0 | 0 | 49 | 0 | 49 |
| 92 | (United States) Benjamin Ritchie | 0 | 0 | 0 | 48 | 48 |
| 93 | (Austria) Andreas Ploier | 31 | 14 | 0 | 0 | 45 |
| 94 | (United States) Erik Arvidsson | 44 | 0 | 0 | 0 | 44 |
| 94 | (United Kingdom) Billy Major | 0 | 0 | 0 | 44 | 44 |
| 96 | (France) Flavio Vitale | 0 | 0 | 43 | 0 | 43 |
| 97 | (France) Auguste Aulnette | 0 | 0 | 0 | 40 | 40 |
| 97 | (Switzerland) Ramon Zenhäusern | 0 | 0 | 0 | 40 | 40 |
| 99 | (France) Sam Alphand | 15 | 24 | 0 | 0 | 39 |
| 100 | (United States) Ryder Sarchett | 0 | 0 | 37 | 0 | 37 |
| 100 | (United States) Sam Morse | 7 | 30 | 0 | 0 | 37 |
| 100 | (United States) Bryce Bennett | 32 | 5 | 0 | 0 | 37 |
| 103 | (Italy) Filippo Della Vite | 0 | 0 | 36 | 0 | 36 |
| 103 | (France) Loévan Parand | 0 | 0 | 36 | 0 | 36 |
| 105 | (France) Adrien Théaux | 35 | 0 | 0 | 0 | 35 |
| 105 | (Norway) Aleksander Aamodt Kilde | 24 | 11 | 0 | 0 | 35 |
| 105 | (Germany) Romed Baumann | 21 | 14 | 0 | 0 | 35 |
| 108 | (Italy) Tobias Kastlunger | 0 | 0 | 6 | 26 | 32 |
| 108 | (Italy) Luca De Aliprandini | 0 | 0 | 32 | 0 | 32 |
| 108 | (Austria) Vincent Wieser | 12 | 20 | 0 | 0 | 32 |
| 111 | (France) Antoine Azzolin | 0 | 0 | 0 | 30 | 30 |
| 111 | (United States) Wiley Maple | 30 | 0 | 0 | 0 | 30 |
| 113 | (Canada) Riley Seger | 0 | 29 | 0 | 0 | 29 |
| 114 | (Canada) Jeffrey Read | 5 | 19 | 0 | 0 | 24 |
| 115 | (Switzerland) Livio Hiltbrand | 23 | 0 | 0 | 0 | 23 |
| 115 | (Austria) Stefan Rieser | 23 | 0 | 0 | 0 | 23 |
| 117 | (France) Hugo Desgrippes | 0 | 0 | 0 | 22 | 22 |
| 117 | (Switzerland) Simon Rüland | 0 | 0 | 0 | 22 | 22 |
| 119 | (Chile) Henrik von Appen | 21 | 0 | 0 | 0 | 21 |
| 120 | (Switzerland) Arnaud Boisset | 20 | 0 | 0 | 0 | 20 |
| 120 | (Sweden) Kristoffer Jakobsen | 0 | 0 | 0 | 20 | 20 |
| 120 | (Spain) Joaquim Salarich | 0 | 0 | 0 | 20 | 20 |
| 123 | (Austria) Adrian Pertl | 0 | 0 | 0 | 18 | 18 |
| 124 | (France) Charles Gamel Seigneur | 16 | 0 | 0 | 0 | 16 |
| 124 | (Norway) Rasmus Bakkevig | 0 | 0 | 16 | 0 | 16 |
| 126 | (Canada) Erik Read | 0 | 0 | 15 | 0 | 15 |
| 127 | (Spain) Albert Ortega Fornesa | 0 | 0 | 14 | 0 | 14 |
| 127 | (Germany) Sebastian Holzmann | 0 | 0 | 0 | 14 | 14 |
| 129 | (United States) Jett Seymour | 0 | 0 | 0 | 13 | 13 |
| 130 | (Switzerland) Lenz Hächler | 0 | 0 | 12 | 0 | 12 |
| 130 | (Croatia) Istok Rodeš | 0 | 0 | 0 | 12 | 12 |
| 130 | (United States) Luke Winters | 0 | 0 | 0 | 12 | 12 |
| 130 | (Japan) Yohei Koyama | 0 | 0 | 0 | 12 | 12 |
| 130 | (Finland) Jesper Pohjolainen | 0 | 0 | 0 | 12 | 12 |
| 135 | (Canada) Raphaël Lessard | 0 | 11 | 0 | 0 | 11 |
| 135 | (Estonia) Tormis Laine | 0 | 0 | 11 | 0 | 11 |
| 137 | (Norway) Theodor Brækken | 0 | 0 | 0 | 10 | 10 |
| 137 | (Italy) Matteo Canins | 0 | 0 | 0 | 10 | 10 |
| 137 | (Slovakia) Andreas Žampa | 0 | 0 | 10 | 0 | 10 |
| 140 | (Italy) Nicolo Molteni | 0 | 8 | 0 | 0 | 8 |
| 140 | (Sweden) William Hansson | 0 | 0 | 8 | 0 | 8 |
| 142 | (Austria) Manuel Tranninger | 7 | 0 | 0 | 0 | 7 |
| 142 | (Spain) Aleix Aubert Serracanta | 0 | 0 | 7 | 0 | 7 |
| 142 | (Switzerland) Fadri Janutin | 0 | 0 | 7 | 0 | 7 |
| 142 | (Switzerland) Marc Rochat | 0 | 0 | 0 | 7 | 7 |
| 146 | (United States) Jared Goldberg | 0 | 6 | 0 | 0 | 6 |
| 146 | (Japan) Shiro Aihara | 0 | 0 | 0 | 6 | 6 |
| 148 | (France) Guerlain Favre | 0 | 0 | 5 | 0 | 5 |
| 148 | (United States) Cooper Puckett | 0 | 0 | 0 | 5 | 5 |
| 148 | (Italy) Max Perathoner | 0 | 5 | 0 | 0 | 5 |
| 151 | (Slovenia) Nejc Naraločnik | 4 | 0 | 0 | 0 | 4 |
| 151 | (Spain) Juan del Campo | 0 | 0 | 0 | 4 | 4 |
| 151 | (United States) Bridger Gile | 0 | 0 | 4 | 0 | 4 |
| 151 | (Italy) Tommaso Saccardi | 0 | 0 | 0 | 4 | 4 |
| 151 | (United States) George Steffey | 0 | 0 | 4 | 0 | 4 |
| 151 | (Italy) Simon Talacci | 0 | 0 | 4 | 0 | 4 |
| 151 | (Sweden) Gustav Wissting | 0 | 0 | 0 | 4 | 4 |
| 158 | (Italy) Corrado Barbera | 0 | 0 | 0 | 3 | 3 |

- Leader
- 2nd place
- 3rd place
- does not compete in this discipline
- Updated on 25 March 2026, after all events.

== See also ==
- 2026 Alpine Skiing World Cup – Men's summary rankings
- 2026 Alpine Skiing World Cup – Men's downhill
- 2026 Alpine Skiing World Cup – Men's super-G
- 2026 Alpine Skiing World Cup – Men's giant slalom
- 2026 Alpine Skiing World Cup – Men's slalom
- 2026 Alpine Skiing World Cup – Women's overall
- World Cup scoring system
