= FIS Alpine World Ski Championships 2025 – Nations team event =

Ski Event

Nations team event at the FIS Alpine World Ski Championships 2025
- Venue: Skicircus Saalbach-Hinterglemm/Leogang
- Location: Saalbach-Hinterglemm, Austria
- Dates: 4 February
- Competitors: 71 from 14 nations
- Teams: 14

Medalists
gold medal	Giorgia Collomb; Lara Della Mea; Filippo Della Vite; Alex Vinatzer	Italy
silver medal	Luca Aerni; Delphine Darbellay; Wendy Holdener; Thomas Tumler	Switzerland
bronze medal	Estelle Alphand; Fabian Ax Swartz; William Hansson; Sara Hector; Kristoffer Jakobsen; Lisa Nyberg	Sweden

The Nations team event competition at the FIS Alpine World Ski Championships 2025 was held on 4 February 2025.

== FIS Overall Nations Cup standings ==
The participating nations were seeded according to the overall Nations Cup standings prior to the World Championships.

Teams marked in green participated.

Rank	Country	Points
1	Switzerland	7150
2	Austria	4728
3	Italy	3877
4	Norway	3434
5	United States	2509
6	France	2438
7	Sweden	1397
8	Germany	1293
9	Croatia	1177
10	Canada	1167
11	Slovenia	1058
12	Brazil	474
13	Albania	408
14	New Zealand	385
15	Czech Republic	343
16	Great Britain	252
17	Bulgaria	211
18	Belgium	184
19	Andorra	124
20	Finland	97
21	Poland	68
22	Estonia	67
23	Bosnia and Herzegovina	22
24	Spain	16
25	Slovakia	13
26	Greece	12
27	Latvia	10
28	Chile	8
29	Netherlands	8
30	Liechtenstein	4
31	Argentina	1
—	Ukraine	0

== Bracket ==
Round of 16
Germany	4
Slovenia	0
United States	3
Poland	1
Norway	3
Argentina	1
Italy	4
Ukraine	0
France	4
Great Britain	0
Sweden	3
Czech Republic	1

Quarterfinals
Switzerland	2
Germany	2
United States	3
Norway	1
Italy	3
France	1
Sweden	2
Austria	2

Semifinals
Switzerland	2
United States	2
Italy	2
Sweden	2

Final
Switzerland	2
Italy	2
Third place
United States	1
Sweden	3
