= Valentin Giraud Moine =

French alpine skier (born 1992)

Personal information
- Born: 23 January 1992 (age 34) Gap, Hautes-Alpes, France
- Height: 1.78 m (5 ft 10 in)

Skiing career
- Sport: Alpine skiing
- Club: E.C. Champsaur
- Disciplines: Downhill, Super-G, Combined
World Cup debut
| 30 November 2013 (age 21) |

Olympics
- Teams: 0

World Championships
- Teams: 0

World Cup
- Seasons: 6 – (2014–17, 2019, 2021)
- Wins: 0
- Podiums: 2 – (2 DH)
- Overall titles: 0 – (43rd in 2017)
- Discipline titles: 0 – (7th in AC, 2017)
Medal record
Men's alpine skiing
Representing France
Junior World Championships
| Bronze medal – third place | 2013 Le Massif | Downhill |

Valentin Giraud Moine (born 23 January 1992) is a French World Cup alpine ski racer and specializes in the speed events of downhill and super-G.

== Biography ==
Born in Gap, Hautes-Alpes, Giraud Moine made his World Cup debut in November 2013 in the downhill in Lake Louise, Canada. His first podium was in downhill in March 2016 at Kvitfjell, Norway.

On 27 January 2017, Giraud Moine was injured after crashing while competing in the men's World Cup downhill at Garmisch-Partenkirchen, and he was airlifted to a hospital. He dislocated both knees and could have lost the use of his legs without the rapid medical intervention.

Giraud Moine recovered from his injuries and went on to win the Final European Cup Downhill ranking in 2020. In December 2020, he finished 14th in the Val d'Isère downhill.

He competed as sighted guide for Hyacinthe Deleplace at the 2022 Winter Paralympics held in Beijing, China.

== World Cup results ==
=== Season standings ===
| Season | Age | Overall | Slalom | Giant slalom | Super-G | Downhill | Combined |
|---|---|---|---|---|---|---|---|
| 2014 | 21 | 87 | — | — | 40 | 39 | 21 |
| 2015 | 22 | no points | | | | | |
| 2016 | 23 | 47 | — | — | 38 | 20 | 22 |
| 2017 | 24 | 43 | — | — | — | 21 | 7 |
| 2018 | 25 | injured | | | | | |
| 2019 | 26 | 142 | — | — | — | — | 36 |
| 2020 | 27 | 155 | — | — | — | 56 | — |
| 2021 | 28 | 99 | — | — | — | 27 | — |

Standings through 17 January 2021

=== Race podiums ===
- 2 podiums – (2 DH); 6 top tens

| Season | Date | Location | Discipline | Place |
|---|---|---|---|---|
| 2016 | 12 Mar 2016 | Kvitfjell, Norway | Downhill | 2nd |
| 2017 | 21 Jan 2017 | Kitzbühel, Austria | Downhill | 2nd |
