= 2016 Alpine Skiing World Cup – Men's combined =

Alpine ski discipline year standings

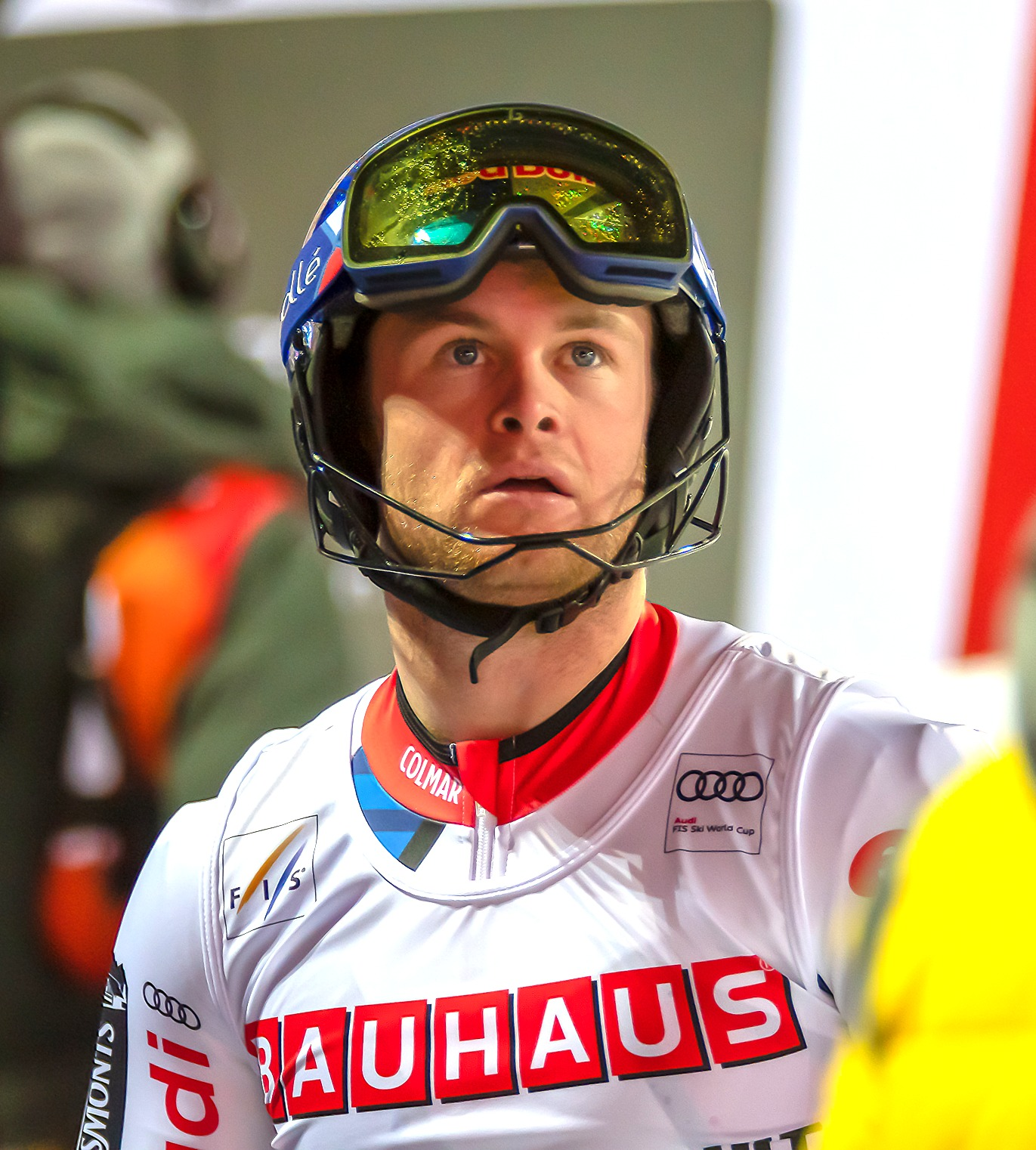
2016 Men's combined World Cup: Alexis Pinturault of France, season champion; 2016 Men's World Cup; Overall • Downhill • Super-G; Giant slalom • Slalom • Combined
Previous: 2015	Next: 2017

The Men's combined competition in the 2016 FIS Alpine Skiing World Cup involved three events that combined a one-run speed race (downhill (generally referred to as a "super-combined") or Super-G (generally referred to as an "Alpine combined")) with a one-run slalom. Under the rules in effect at the time, three races in the discipline were required to award a crystal globe to the discipline champion (and, in a change, fewer than three races might still be sufficient, after no crystal globes were handed out in the discipline for the three previous seasons). The declining popularity of combined skiing (reflected in the small number of events the past three years) led the three combined races scheduled for 2016 to be run under three different formats. The first race, at Wengen, was run as a traditional super-combined (downhill followed by slalom); the second race, at Kitzbühel, was run as a traditional Alpine combined (Super-G followed by slalom); and the third race, at Chamonix, was run as an inverted super-combined (slalom followed by downhill).

Alexis Pinturault of France had been co-champion in two of the previous three seasons where too few races had been held for the discipline champion to be awarded a crystal globe and runner-up, 2013-14 in the other (2015). However, with three races back on the schedule in 2016, Pintaurault won the last two of them to claim the crystal globe for the season.

At this time, combined races were not included in the season finals, which were scheduled in 2016 in St. Moritz, Switzerland.

== Standings ==
#	Skier	15 Jan 2016; Wengen (Switzerland)	22 Jan 2016; Kitzbühel (Austria)	19 Feb 2016; Chamonix (France)	Tot.
	(France) Alexis Pinturault	20	100	100	220
2	(France) Thomas Mermillod-Blondin	50	60	60	170
3	(Norway) Kjetil Jansrud	100	20	45	165
4	(Italy) Dominik Paris	45	36	80	161
5	(France) Victor Muffat-Jeandet	0	80	50	130
6	(France) Adrien Théaux	60	DNF1	36	96
7	(Switzerland) Carlo Janka	DNF2	50	40	90
8	(Austria) Romed Baumann	32	40	16	88
9	(Norway) Aksel Lund Svindal	80	DNF2	DNS	80
10	(Austria) Vincent Kriechmayr	29	32	14	75
11	(Slovenia) Klemen Kosi	36	22	6	64
12	(Switzerland) Marc Gisin	40	DNF1	20	60
	(Slovakia) Adam Žampa	15	45	DNF1	60
14	(Italy) Riccardo Tonetti	DNS	26	32	58
15	(Croatia) Natko Zrnčić-Dim	24	13	12	49
16	(United States) Bryce Bennett	9	29	10	48
	(Italy) Peter Fill	26	DNF2	22	48
	(Norway) Aleksander Aamodt Kilde	DNF2	24	24	48
19	(Switzerland) Justin Murisier	10	12	18	40
20	(Croatia) Ivica Kostelić	7	DNS	29	36
21	(United States) Jared Goldberg	22	DNF1	11	33
22	(France) Valentin Giraud Moine	18	DNF1	13	31
23	(France) Blaise Giezendanner	DNS	DNS2	26	26
24	(Switzerland) Nils Mani	5	11	8	24
25	(Germany) Andreas Sander	1	16	3	20
	References				

- Winner
- 2nd place
- 3rd place
- DNS = Did Not Start
- DNS2 = Finished run 1; Did Not Start run 2
- DNF1 = Did Not Finish run 1
- DNF2 = Did Not Finish run 2
- Updated at 19 March 2016, after all events.

== See also ==
- 2016 Alpine Skiing World Cup – Men's summary rankings
- 2016 Alpine Skiing World Cup – Men's overall
- 2016 Alpine Skiing World Cup – Men's downhill
- 2016 Alpine Skiing World Cup – Men's super-G
- 2016 Alpine Skiing World Cup – Men's giant slalom
- 2016 Alpine Skiing World Cup – Men's slalom
