= 2016 Alpine Skiing World Cup – Men's downhill =

Alpine ski discipline year standings

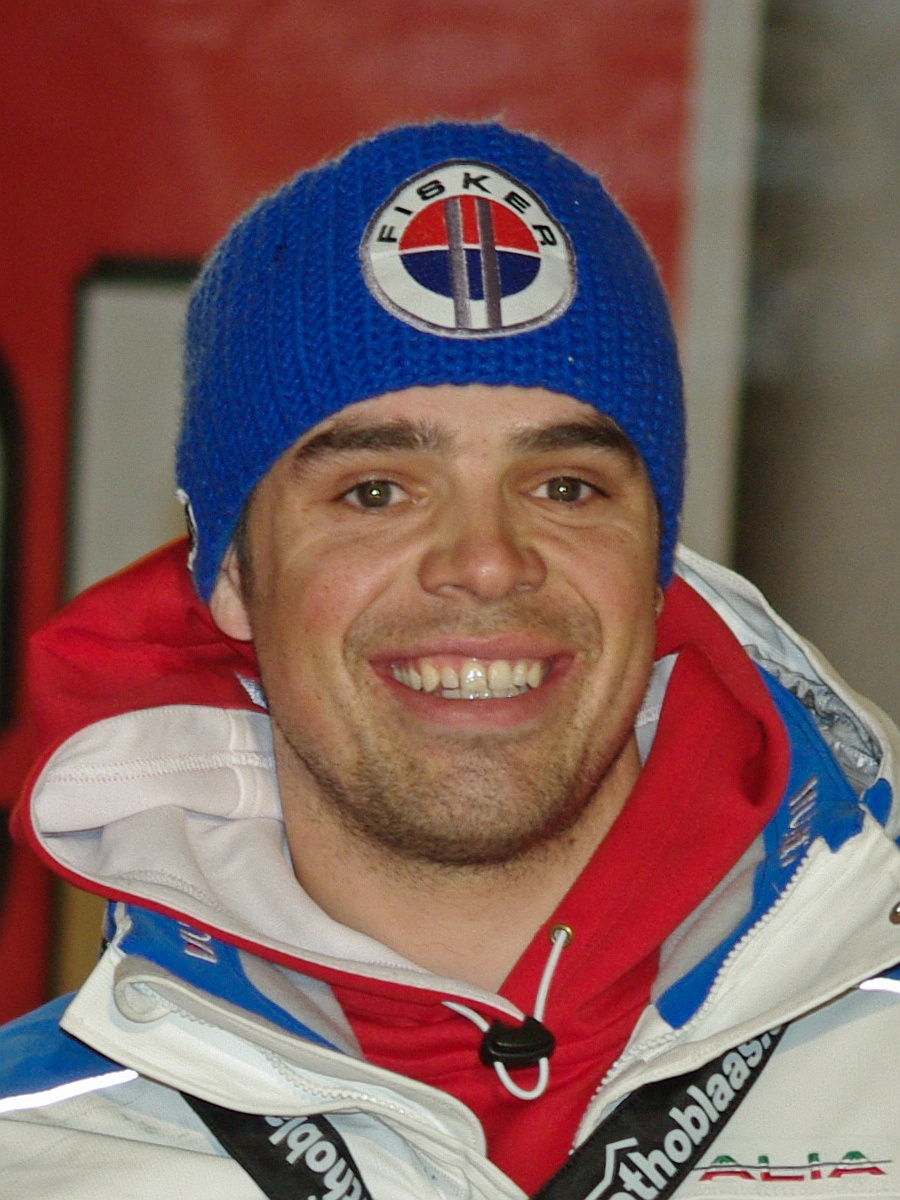
2016 Men's downhill World Cup: Peter Fill of Italy, season champion; 2016 Men's World Cup; Overall • Downhill • Super-G; Giant slalom • Slalom • Combined
Previous: 2015	Next: 2017

The men's downhill competition in the 2016 FIS Alpine Skiing World Cup involved eleven events, including the season finale in St. Moritz, Switzerland.

Two-time discipline champion Aksel Lund Svindal from Norway got off to a fantastic start, winning four of the first five downhills of the season . . . and even winning the downhill run on the Lauberhorn in Wengen, Switzerland for the first time in his career (in his tenth attempt). Unfortunately, in the very next downhill race a week later, at the Streif downhill run in Kitzbühel (where Svindal had won a Super-G two days before), Svindal crashed and suffered an anterior cruciate ligament (ACL) tear in his right knee, ending his season. Because of poor visibility and dangerous winds, which already had led the course to be shortened before the race even started, the Streif downhill was stopped after just 30 skiers, the minimum number for the race to be deemed official -- but it already had produced three serious crashes among the best downhillers in the world.

However, the surprise winner on the Streif was Peter Fill of Italy, who had started the day 245 points behind Svindal but picked up 100 for the win. After four more downhills, and heading into the finals, Fill and Svindal were tied on points (436) with Italy's Dominik Paris only four points behind. In the finals at St. Moritz, although both skied cautiously, Fill placed tenth, scoring 26 points, but Paris finished nineteenth and failed to score any points (as only the top 15 score at the finals), thus allowing Fill to become the first ever Italian man to win the downhill crystal globe.

== Standings ==
Rank	Name	28 Nov 2015; Lake Louise (Canada)	4 Dec 2015; Beaver Creek (United States)	19 Dec 2015; Val Gardena/Gröden (Italy)	29 Dec 2015; Santa Caterina (Italy)	16 Jan 2016; Wengen (Switzerland)	23 Jan 2016; Kitzbühel (Austria)	30 Jan 2016; Garmisch-Partenkirchen (Germany)	6 Feb 2016; Jeongseon (South Korea)	20 Feb 2016; Chamonix (France)	12 Mar 2016; Kvitfjell (Norway)	16 Mar 2016; St. Moritz (Switzerland)	Total
	(Italy) Peter Fill	80	32	50	DNF	29	100	24	50	45	26	26	462
2	(Norway) Aksel Lund Svindal	100	100	100	36	100	DNF	DNS					436
3	(Italy) Dominik Paris	36	11	20	0	50	15	20	80	100	100	0	432
	(Norway) Kjetil Jansrud	29	80	60	4	22	18	14	100	10	45	50	432
5	(Switzerland) Beat Feuz	DNS				24	80	60	45	60	45	100	414
6	(United States) Steven Nyman	15	16	29	5	15	DNF	26	60	80	60	80	386
7	(France) Adrien Théaux	24	26	6	100	36	32	45	32	40	29	0	370
8	(France) Guillermo Fayed	50	60	80	29	9	10	9	26	50	DNS		323
9	(Switzerland) Carlo Janka	45	45	7	22	32	60	5	36	8	20	32	312
10	(Austria) Hannes Reichelt	13	50	5	80	80	DNF	DNF	22	26	0	20	296
11	(United States) Travis Ganong	60	22	20	14	0	13	40	9	DNS	32	40	250
12	(Canada) Erik Guay	26	24	45	DNS	18	24	DNF	3	32	15	60	247
	(Austria) Christof Innerhofer	22	36	0	50	45	12	50	10	1	5	16	247
	(Norway) Aleksander Aamodt Kilde	16	15	DNF	DNF	16	40	100	DNF	24	36	0	247
15	(France) Johan Clarey	20	9	24	15	8	50	DNF	16	22	26	45	235
16	(Austria) Romed Baumann	12	0	15	45	14	22	15	29	11	14	22	199
17	(Slovenia) Boštjan Kline	7	4	0	9	7	8	80	24	14	8	24	185
18	(Austria) Vincent Kriechmayr	1	18	36	40	13	36	0	2	5	2	29	182
19	(France) David Poisson	4	0	0	60	40	29	16	14	3	7	DNS	173
20	(France) Valentin Giraud Moine	0	DNS	16	8	0	DNS	DNF	13	18	80	36	171
21	(Canada) Manuel Osborne-Paradis	1	0	22	DNF	0	16	10	0	36	50	18	153
22	(United States) Andrew Weibrecht	7	45	14	DNF	10	20	14	15	13	11	0	149
23	(Austria) Klaus Kröll	18	3	13	12	60	DNF	1	7	15	16	0	145
24	(Austria) Otmar Striedinger	3	20	1	13	12	26	3	40	20	DNF	0	138
25	(Germany) Andreas Sander	0	0	8	26	20	14	32	4	7	22	0	133
	References												

- Winner
- 2nd place
- 3rd place
- DNF = Did Not Finish
- DNS = Did Not Start
- Updated at 19 March 2016, after all events.

== See also ==
- 2016 Alpine Skiing World Cup – Men's summary rankings
- 2016 Alpine Skiing World Cup – Men's overall
- 2016 Alpine Skiing World Cup – Men's super-G
- 2016 Alpine Skiing World Cup – Men's giant slalom
- 2016 Alpine Skiing World Cup – Men's slalom
- 2016 Alpine Skiing World Cup – Men's combined
- World Cup scoring system
