= 2016 Alpine Skiing World Cup – Men's super-G =

Alpine ski discipline year standings

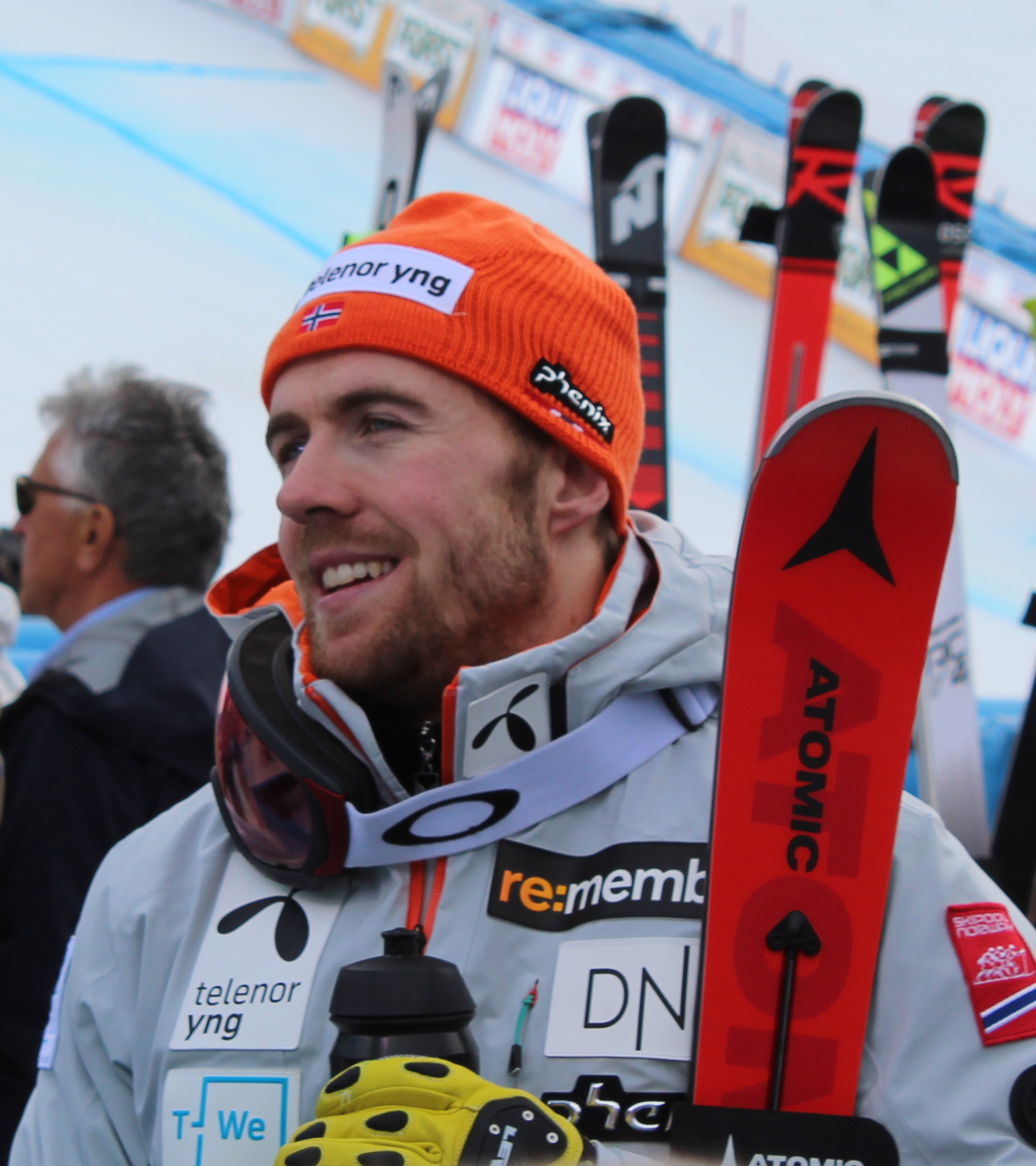
2016 Men's Super-G World Cup: Aleksander Aamodt Kilde of Norway, season champion; 2016 Men's World Cup; Overall • Downhill • Super-G; Giant slalom • Slalom • Combined
Previous: 2015	Next: 2017

The men's super-G competition in the 2016 FIS Alpine Skiing World Cup involved eight events, including the finals in St. Moritz, Switzerland.

In the previous four seasons, this discipline had been won by two different Norwegians, Aksel Lund Svindal (2012–14) and Kjetil Jansrud (2015), and Svindal started the season out as if he were going to reclaim the title, winning three of the first four Super-G races. However, two days after winning the Super-G in Kitzbühel, Svindal (along with Austria's Georg Streitberger) suffered a season-ending injury in a downhill there. That opened up the race for the discipline title, which then became a wide-open battle that also included 23-year-old Norwegian skier Aleksander Aamodt Kilde. After Jansrud won the next-to-last Super-G of the season in Kvitfjell, Kilde had a five-point lead on the inactive Svindal, a 37-point lead on Austria's Vincent Kriechmayr, and a 40-point lead over Jansrud. In the finals, Kilde and Jansrud tied for second, earning each 80 points and giving the crystal globe to Kilde (extending Norway's dominance to five seasons) as part of an all-Norwegian podium with Jansrud and Svindal.

== Standings ==
Rank	Name	29 Nov 2015; Lake Louise (Canada)	5 Dec 2015; Beaver Creek (United States)	18 Dec 2015; Val Gardena/Gröden (Italy)	22 Jan 2016; Kitzbühel (Austria)	7 Feb 2016; Jeongseon (South Korea)	27 Feb 2016; Hinterstoder (Austria)	26 Feb 2016; Kvitfjell (Norway)	16 Mar 2016; St. Moritz (Switzerland)	Total
	(Norway) Aleksander Aamodt Kilde	26	36	60	13	50	100	50	80	415
2	(Norway) Kjetil Jansrud	36	0	80	50	-	29	100	80	375
3	(Norway) Aksel Lund Svindal	100	10	100	100	DNS				310
4	(Austria) Vincent Kriechmayr	32	26	26	24	60	50	80	DNF	298
5	(Switzerland) Carlo Janka	DNF	32	1	29	100	45	36	16	259
6	(Austria) Marcel Hirscher	DNS	100	DNS	8	36	60	DNS	45	249
7	(Austria) Adrien Théaux	29	50	40	DNF	15	40	24	50	248
8	(United States) Andrew Weibrecht	5	60	45	80	DNF	9	45	DNF	244
9	(Italy) Peter Fill	60	5	8	40	45	DNF	32	36	226
10	(Italy) Dominik Paris	40	20	32	45	DNF	15	60	DNS	212
11	(Italy) Christof Innerhofer	8	18	10	10	80	22	16	20	184
12	(Switzerland) Beat Feuz	DNS			15	11	16	40	100	182
13	(Austria) Hannes Reichelt	24	15	11	60	29	15	20	DNF	174
14	(Slovenia) Boštjan Kline	18	0	DNF	16	24	80	5	29	172
15	(Austria) Romed Baumann	22	11	13	32	40	8	12	26	164
	(Germany) Andreas Sander	1	9	18	26	26	18	26	40	164
17	(Italy) Mattia Casse	16	50	5	36	20	20	10	DNF	157
18	(Austria) Matthias Mayer	80	0	50	DNS					130
19	(United States) Travis Ganong	50	40	12	DNF	DNS		18	DNF	120
20	(Canada) Erik Guay	20	29	22	DNF	14	DNS	32	DNF	117
21	(Switzerland) Thomas Tumler	0	22	20	8	12	6	9	32	109
22	(Austria) Max Franz	50	16	15	DNS			DNF	24	105
23	(Switzerland) Ralph Weber	DNS		24	3	18	10	22	22	99
24	(Austria) Patrick Schweiger	15	0	32	DNF	8	36	DNF	DNF	91
25	(United States) Ted Ligety	DNS	80	DNS	DNF	DNS				80
26	(Austria) Georg Streitberger	7	14	36	18	DNS				75
27	(France) Alexis Pinturault	0	DNF	0	20	DNS	32	DNS	18	70
	References									

- Winner
- 2nd place
- 3rd place
- DNF = Did not finish
- DSQ = Disqualified
- DNS = Did not start
- Updated at 21 March 2016, after all events.

== See also ==
- 2016 Alpine Skiing World Cup – Men's summary rankings
- 2016 Alpine Skiing World Cup – Men's overall
- 2016 Alpine Skiing World Cup – Men's downhill
- 2016 Alpine Skiing World Cup – Men's giant slalom
- 2016 Alpine Skiing World Cup – Men's slalom
- 2016 Alpine Skiing World Cup – Men's combined
- World Cup scoring system
