= 2016 Alpine Skiing World Cup – Men's overall =

Alpine ski discipline year standings

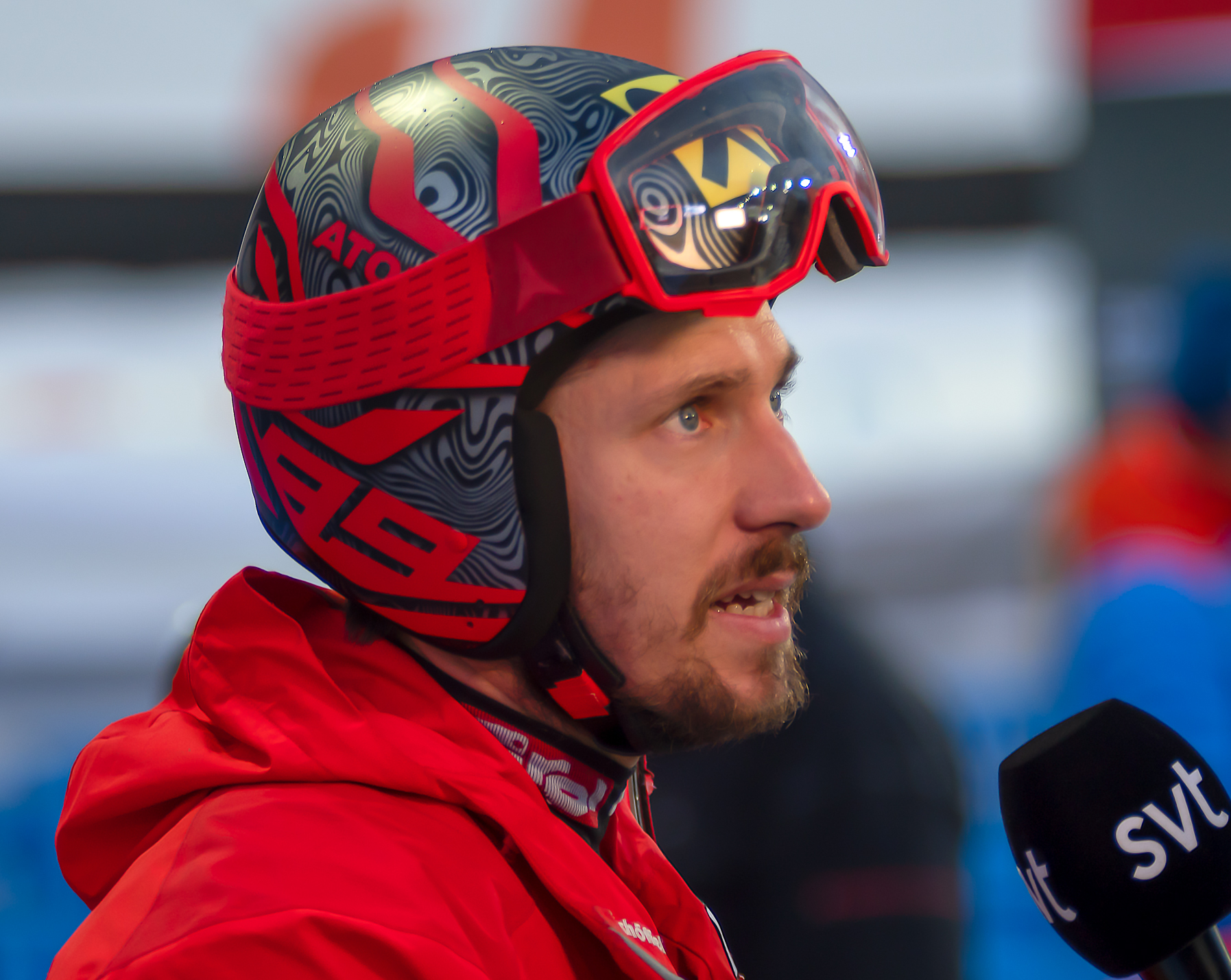
2016 men's overall World Cup: Marcel Hirscher of Austria, season champion; 2016 men's World Cup; Overall • downhill • super-g; giant slalom • slalom • combined
Previous: 2015	Next: 2017

The men's overall competition in the 2016 FIS Alpine Skiing World Cup involved 44 events in 5 disciplines: downhill (DH) (11 races), Super-G (SG) (8 races), giant slalom (GS) (11 races), slalom (SL) (11 races), and Alpine combined (AC) (3 races). The newly introduced Parallel giant slalom event at Alta Badia, Italy—which was included in the giant slalom season standings—was a relatively short Giant slalom course that pitted the men against one another in a modified bracket-reduction format from a field of thirty-two qualifying skiers, eventually whittled down to just four final-round racers in a "large final" (for the championship) and a "small final" (for third).

27-year-old Marcel Hirscher of Austria won the overall title for the fifth consecutive time, tying two all-time records: most overall World Cup titles by a man (five, tied with Marc Girardelli of Luxembourg, and one less than the overall record of six held since 1979 by Annemarie Moser-Pröll), and most consecutive titles (five, also held by Moser-Pröll).

An odd incident threatened to mar the early season as a small, remotely-piloted camera drone, operated by broadcast media to give viewers a taste of the skiers' field of vision, crashed and narrowly missed Hirscher during his second run in the slalom at Madonna di Campiglio just before Christmas. Hirscher nevertheless finished second in the race, but shortly after the incident, the International Ski Federation banned remotely-piloted vehicles from flying over their events as a matter of safety and concern for the welfare of their athletes, staff and viewers.

Through midseason, possession of the overall crystal globe for the season was closely fought between four-time overall champion Hirscher and two-time overall champion Aksel Lund Svindal of Norway, with Svindal actually in the lead, but on 23 January, in the legendary Streif downhill on the Hahnenkamm at Kitzbühel, Austria, Svindal fell and suffered a season-ending ligament tear in his right knee. Because of poor visibility and dangerous winds, which already had led the course to be shortened, the downhill produced three serious crashes in just 30 skiers, the minimum number for the race to be deemed official, before it was stopped—but the damage had already been done.

After Svindal's departure, Hirscher won the overall crystal globe by almost 500 points over Henrik Kristoffersen of Norway. In addition to Svindal and Kristofferson, two other Norwegians placed in the top 7 in overall points: Kjetil Jansrud and Aleksander Aamodt Kilde.

The finals were held in St. Moritz, Switzerland from 16 to 20 March 2016.

== Standings ==
#	Skier	DH; 11 races	SG; 8 races	GS; 11 races	SL; 11 races	AC; 3 races	Tot.
	(Austria) Marcel Hirscher	0	249	766	780	0	1,795
2	(Norway) Henrik Kristoffersen	0	0	487	811	0	1,298
3	(France) Alexis Pinturault	0	70	690	220	220	1,200
4	(Norway) Kjetil Jansrud	432	375	149	40	165	1,161
5	(Norway) Aksel Lund Svindal	436	310	90	0	80	916
6	(Italy) Dominik Paris	432	212	0	0	161	805
7	(Norway) Aleksander Aamodt Kilde	247	415	46	0	48	756
8	(Germany) Felix Neureuther	0	0	354	389	0	743
9	(Switzerland) Carlo Janka	312	259	76	0	90	737
10	(Italy) Peter Fill	462	226	0	0	48	736
11	(France) Adrien Théaux	370	248	0	0	96	714
12	(France) Victor Muffat-Jeandet	0	12	405	162	130	709
13	(Switzerland) Beat Feuz	414	182	0	0	0	596
14	(Austria) Vincent Kriechmayr	182	298	0	0	75	555
15	(Sweden) Andre Myhrer	0	0	176	367	0	543
16	(Austria) Hannes Reichelt	296	174	15	0	0	485
17	(Germany) Fritz Dopfer	0	0	144	339	0	483
18	(Austria) Romed Baumann	199	164	0	0	88	451
19	(Italy) Christof Innerhofer	247	184	0	0	18	449
20	(United States) Steven Nyman	386	54	0	0	0	440
21	(France) Mathieu Faivre	0	0	423	0	0	423
22	(United States) Andrew Weibrecht	149	244	3	0	0	396
23	(France) Thomas Fanara	0	0	374	0	0	374
24	(Slovenia) Boštjan Kline	185	172	0	0	15	372
25	(United States) Travis Ganong	250	120	0	0	0	370
26	(Canada) Erik Guay	247	117	0	0	0	364
27	(Russia) Alexander Khoroshilov	0	0	0	358	0	358
28	(Italy) Stefano Gross	0	0	0	345	0	345

- Leader
- 2nd place
- 3rd place
- Updated at 21 March 2016, after all events

== See also ==
- 2016 Alpine Skiing World Cup – Men's summary rankings
- 2016 Alpine Skiing World Cup – Men's downhill
- 2016 Alpine Skiing World Cup – Men's super-G
- 2016 Alpine Skiing World Cup – Men's giant slalom
- 2016 Alpine Skiing World Cup – Men's slalom
- 2016 Alpine Skiing World Cup – Men's combined
- 2016 Alpine Skiing World Cup – Women's overall
