= 2016 Alpine Skiing World Cup – Men's giant slalom =

Alpine ski discipline year standings

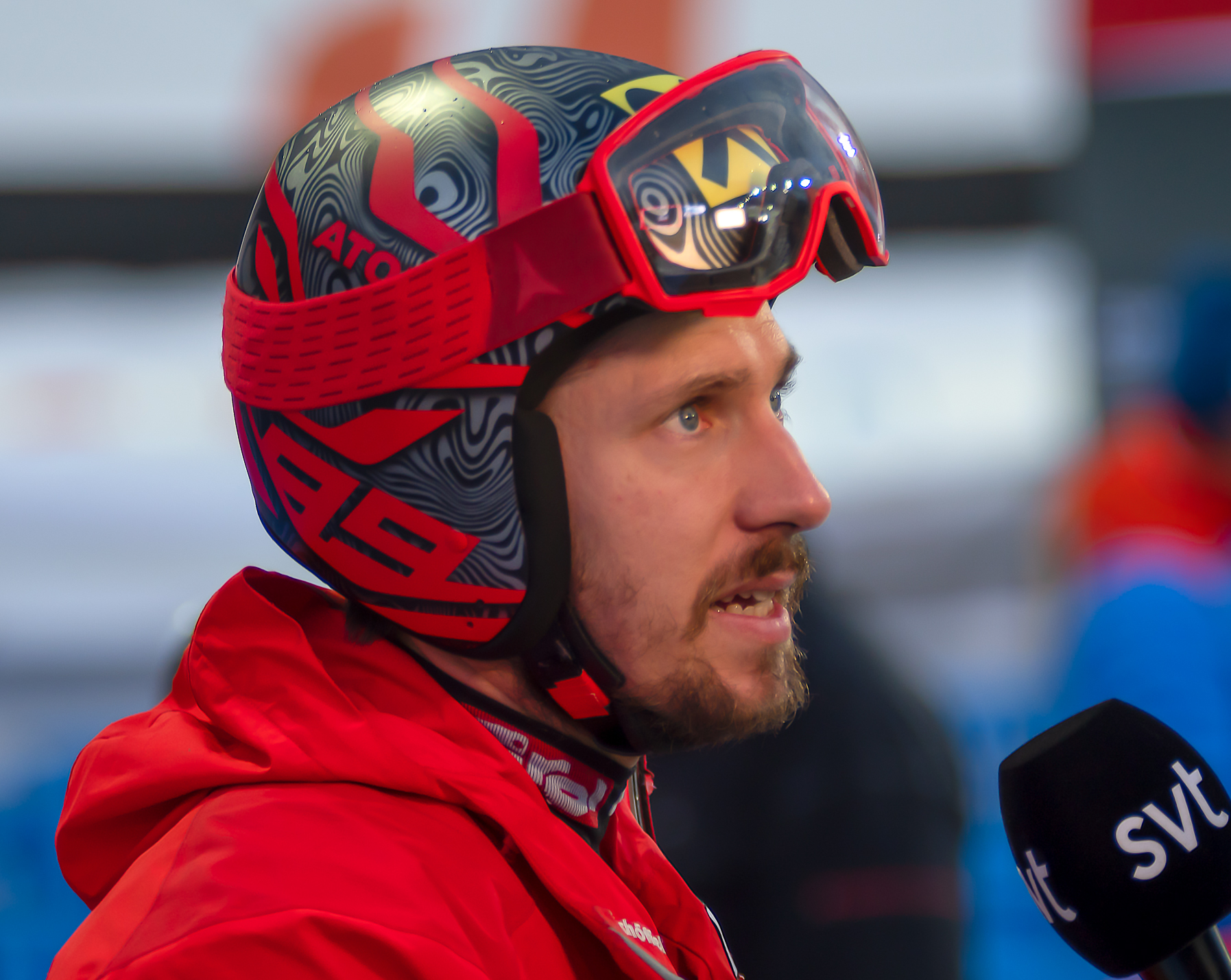
2016 Men's Giant slalom World Cup: Marcel Hirscher of Austria, season champion; 2016 Men's World Cup; Overall • Downhill • Super-G; Giant slalom • Slalom • Combined
Previous: 2015	Next: 2017

The men's giant slalom competition in the 2016 FIS Alpine Skiing World Cup involved eleven events, including the first-ever parallel giant slalom (included in the giant slalom discipline standings) and the season finals in St. Moritz, Switzerland. The newly introduced Parallel giant slalom event at Alta Badia, Italy was a relatively short Giant slalom course that pitted the men against one another in a modified bracket-reduction format from a field of thirty-two qualifying skiers, eventually whittled down to just four final-round racers in a "large final" (for the championship) and a "small final" (for third).

Defending discipline champion Marcel Hirscher of Austria and Alexis Pinturault of France each won four of the races this season and finished second in two others, After Pintauralt's fourth straight victory, in Kranjska Gora, he had closed his deficit to Hirscher to just 91 points with two races remaining. However, Hirscher came back to win the giant slalom the next day on the same course, locking up the season championship with a 111-point lead over Pinturault with just one race remaining. This was Hirscher's third title in this discipline on his way to his fifth straight overall World Cup championship.

== Standings ==
Parallel giant slalom (PG)

#	Skier	25 Oct 2015; Sölden (Austria)	6 Dec 2015; Beaver Creek (United States)	12 Dec 2015; Val d'Isère (France)	20 Dec 2015; Alta Badia (Italy)	21 Dec 2015; Alta Badia (PG) (Italy)	13 Feb 2016; Yuzaka Naeba (Japan)	26 Feb 2016; Hinterstoder (Austria)	28 Feb 2016; Hinterstoder (Austria)	4 Mar 2016; Kranjska Gora (Slovenia)	5 Mar 2016; Kranjska Gora (Slovenia)	19 Mar 2016; St. Moritz (Switzerland)	Tot.
	(Austria) Marcel Hirscher	60	100	100	100	1	40	80	80	60	100	45	766
2	(France) Alexis Pinturault	45	DNF1	DNS	40	45	100	100	100	100	80	80	690
3	(Norway) Henrik Kristoffersen	40	60	DNF2	80	11	50	50	60	50	60	26	487
4	(France) Mathieu Faivre	29	36	26	45	32	80	DNF2	50	45	20	60	423
5	(France) Victor Muffat-Jeandet	26	80	60	60	26	45	DSQ1	20	32	24	32	405
6	(France) Thomas Fanara	80	DNF1	DNF2	13	2	13	60	45	16	45	100	374
7	(Germany) Felix Neureuther	40	45	80	32	11	16	40	40	DNF2	50	0	354
8	(Austria) Philipp Schörghofer	18	29	8	29	14	22	18	24	80	40	50	332
9	(Italy) Florian Eisath	24	40	14	20	1	26	8	32	20	14	36	235
	(Germany) Stefan Luitz	13	9	36	26	12	10	45	29	26	29	DNF1	235
11	(Italy) Roberto Nani	50	DNF2	32	24	15	29	32	DNF1	DNQ	11	0	193
12	(Switzerland) Justin Murisier	16	8	24	18	7	24	13	DNQ	26	26	29	191
13	(Austria) Manuel Feller	DNQ	DNS	50	1	18	9	15	12	40	36	DNF1	181
	(Norway) Leif Kristian Haugen	3	22	15	8	20	11	22	22	36	22	DNF1	181
15	(Sweden) Andre Myhrer	11	50	7	DNQ	60	8	26	14	DNQ	DNQ	DNF2	176
16	(Italy) Massimiliano Blardone	DNQ	12	DNQ	9	40	60	5	9	DNF1	13	16	164
	(Finland) Marcus Sandell	DNF1	DNQ	45	15	13	15	DNQ	18	DNQ	18	40	164
18	(United States) Ted Ligety	100	DNF1	DNQ	50	7	DNS						157
19	(Italy) Riccardo Tonetti	DNQ	32	9	7	18	18	14	26	15	12	DNF2	151
20	(Norway) Kjetil Jansrud	6	16	DNS	DNQ	100	DNS	7	2	DNS		18	149
21	(Germany) Fritz Dopfer	11	14	18	14	4	36	12	10	9	16	0	144
22	(Switzerland) Gino Caviezel	DNF1	24	DNF2	10	36	32	DNF1	7	DNF2	DNQ	22	131
23	(Italy) Manfred Mölgg	8	10	16	16	8	20	29	DNF1	13	9	0	129
24	(Austria) Roland Leitinger	40	26	DNF1	DNS2	DNS	1	DNQ	11	18	DSQ1	20	116
25	(United States) Tim Jitloff	14	18	DNQ	36	29	DNQ	DNQ	8	DNQ	DNQ	0	105
	References												

- Winner
- 2nd place
- 3rd place
- DNS = Did not start
- DNF1 = Did Not Finish run 1
- DSQ1 = Disqualified run 1
- DNQ = Did not qualify for run 2
- DNS2 = Finished run 1; Did not start run 2
- DNF2 = Did Not Finish run 2
- DSQ2 = Disqualified run 2

Updated at 21 March 2016 after all events.

== See also ==
- 2016 Alpine Skiing World Cup – Men's summary rankings
- 2016 Alpine Skiing World Cup – Men's overall
- 2016 Alpine Skiing World Cup – Men's downhill
- 2016 Alpine Skiing World Cup – Men's super-G
- 2016 Alpine Skiing World Cup – Men's slalom
- 2016 Alpine Skiing World Cup – Men's combined
