= 2016 Alpine Skiing World Cup – Men's slalom =

Alpine Ski discipline year standings

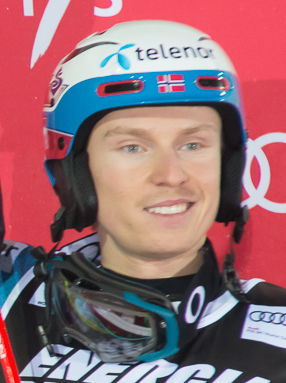
2016 Men's slalom World Cup: Henrik Kristoffersen of Norway, season champion; 2016 Men's World Cup; Overall • Downhill • Super-G; Giant slalom • Slalom • Combined
Previous: 2015	Next: 2017

The men's slalom competition in the 2016 FIS Alpine Skiing World Cup involved 11 events, including one parallel slalom (specifically, a city event, which only includes 16 racers). However, the city event was moved from Munich on 1 January to Stockholm on 23 February due to organization issues. The last race of the season was at the World Cup finals in St. Moritz.

Marcel Hirscher of Austria had won the discipline for the prior three seasons, but this season Henrik Kristoffersen of Norway won six of the first seven races to build a 180-point lead over Hirscher at that point. Although Hirscher won two of the next three races, Kristoffersen still had a 111-point lead with only one race to go, clinching his victory for the season.

== Standings ==
Parallel slalom (PS) or City Event (CE)

#	Skier	13 Dec 2015; Val d'Isère (France)	22 Dec 2015; Madonna di Campiglio (Italy)	6 Jan 2016; Santa Caterina (Italy)	10 Jan 2016; Adelboden (Switzerland)	17 Jan 2016; Wengen (Switzerland)	24 Jan 2016; Kitzbühel (Austria)	26 Jan 2016; Schladming (Austria)	14 Feb 2016; Yuzaka Naeba (Finland)	23 Feb 2016; Stockholm (CE) (Sweden)	6 Mar 2016; Kranjska Gora (Slovenia)	20 Mar 2016; St. Moritz (Switzerland)	Total
	(Norway) Henrik Kristoffersen	100	100	80	100	100	100	100	36	15	80	0	811
2	(Austria) Marcel Hirscher	80	80	100	80	DNF2	80	80	DNF1	100	100	80	780
3	(Germany) Felix Neureuther	60	DNF2	50	32	45	36	DNF2	100	40	DNF2	26	389
4	(Sweden) André Myhrer	DNF1	26	DNF1	DNF1	36	16	DNF2	80	80	29	100	367
5	(Russia) Alexander Khoroshilov	32	22	60	60	DNF1	DNF2	60	18	50	24	32	358
6	(Italy) Stefano Gross	DNF1	14	22	45	60	20	40	24	60	60	0	345
7	(Germany) Fritz Dopfer	DNF1	40	50	29	DNQ	60	45	50	15	50	0	339
8	(Austria) Marco Schwarz	13	60	DNF2	8	18	29	DNQ	60	DNS	45	50	283
9	(France) Julien Lizeroux	45	15	36	24	DNF1	14	22	26	40	DNF2	50	272
10	(Italy) Patrick Thaler	40	20	18	12	16	45	32	13	15	DNF2	29	240
11	(Norway) Sebastian Foss-Solevåg	DNF2	DNF1	26	22	29	DNF2	36	36	15	10	60	234
12	(France) Alexis Pinturault	DNF2	5	32	50	40	DNF1	16	DNF2	15	40	22	220
13	(Switzerland) Daniel Yule	29	24	40	20	DNF2	DNF2	20	29	DNS	15	24	201
14	(Sweden) Mattias Hargin	26	DNF2	10	DSQ1	20	50	DNF2	22	15	36	20	199
15	(United States) David Chodounsky	50	29	DNF1	11	11	24	24	DNQ	DNS	36	0	185
16	(Austria) Marc Digruber	16	11	29	6	10	DNF1	26	45	DNS	18	18	179
17	(Italy) Manfred Mölgg	36	32	DNF1	DNF2	DNF1	26	DSQ2	DNF2	15	26	36	171
18	(France) Victor Muffat-Jeandet	24	18	24	15	26	DNF1	0	15	40	DNQ	0	162
19	(France) Jean-Baptiste Grange	DSQ2	36	13	DNF1	36	22	18	11	DNS	20	DNF2	156
	ITA Giuliano Razzoli	DSQ2	50	DSQ2	26	80	DNF1	DNS					156
21	AUT Manuel Feller	DNF1	10	15	40	DNF1	DNF2	DNF2	20	DNS	DNQ	40	125
22	GBR Dave Ryding	22	7	20	4	15	DNF2	15	9	DNS	7	16	115
23	GER Dominik Stehle	8	DNQ	7	18	0	0	50	8	DNS	22	DNF1	113
24	NOR Jonathan Nordbotten	15	DNF1	DNQ	DNQ	DNF1	40	29	12	15	DNF1	0	111
25	(Sweden) Jens Byggmark	DNF1	12	14	13	50	DNF1	11	DNF1	DNS	9	0	109
	References												

Updated at 21 March 2016 after all events.

== See also ==
- 2016 Alpine Skiing World Cup – Men's summary rankings
- 2016 Alpine Skiing World Cup – Men's overall
- 2016 Alpine Skiing World Cup – Men's downhill
- 2016 Alpine Skiing World Cup – Men's super-G
- 2016 Alpine Skiing World Cup – Men's giant slalom
- 2016 Alpine Skiing World Cup – Men's combined
