= Thibaut Favrot =

French alpine skier (born 2003)

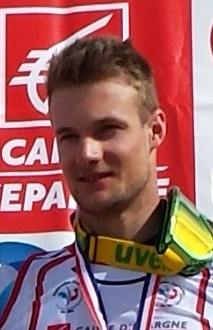
- Favrot in 2014

Personal information
- Born: 22 December 1994 (age 31) Duppigheim, Bas-Rhin, France

Skiing career
- Country: France
- Sport: Alpine skiing
- Club: Skieurs de Strasbourg
- Disciplines: Giant slalom
- World Cup debut: 25 October 2015 (age 20)

Olympics
- Teams: 1 – (2022)
- Medals: 0

World Championships
- Teams: 2 – (2021, 2025)
- Medals: 0

World Cup
- Seasons: 11 – (2016–2026)
- Wins: 0
- Podiums: 1 – (1 PG)
- Overall titles: 0 – (33rd in 2021)
- Discipline titles: 0 – (7th in PAR, 2020)

Thibaut Favrot (born 22 December 1994 in Duppigheim, Bas-Rhin) is a French alpine skier. He competed for France at the 2022 Winter Olympics.

Favrot began skiing with a local club at the age of six. He is also a member of the French military ski team.

== World Cup results ==
=== Season standings ===
Season
Season	Age	Overall	Slalom	Giant slalom	Super-G	Downhill	Combined	Parallel
2018	23	110	—	37	—	—	—	—N/a
2019	24	61	—	19	—	—	—	—N/a
2020	25	59	—	24	—	—	—	7
2021	26	33	—	9	—	—	—N/a	15
2022	27	87	—	24	—	—	—N/a	18
2023	28	118	—	38	—	—	—N/a	—N/a
2024	29	51	—	19	—	—	—N/a	—N/a
2025	30	53	—	16	—	—	—N/a	—N/a
2026	31	69	—	22	—	—	—N/a	—N/a

=== Top-ten results ===
- 0 wins
- 1 podium (1 PG), 14 top tens (3 PG, 11 GS)

Season
Season	Date	Location	Discipline	Place
2019	17 December 2018	Alta Badia, Italy	Parallel-G	2nd
2020	23 December 2019	Alta Badia, Italy	Parallel-G	10th
2020	9 February 2020	Chamonix, France	Parallel-G	6th
2020	22 February 2020	Naeba, Japan	Giant slalom	8th
2021	18 October 2020	Sölden, Austria	Giant slalom	9th
2021	9 January 2021	Adelboden, Switzerland	Giant slalom	9th
2021	27 February 2021	Bansko, Bulgaria	Giant slalom	7th
2021	28 February 2021	Bansko, Bulgaria	Giant slalom	4th
2021	20 March 2021	Lenzerheide, Switzerland	Giant slalom	6th
2023	23 October 2022	Sölden, Austria	Giant slalom	10th
2025	22 December 2024	Alta Badia, Italy	Giant slalom	10th
2025	28 January 2025	Schladming, Austria	Giant slalom	8th
2026	26 October 2025	Sölden, Austria	Giant slalom	5th
2026	7 December 2025	Beaver Creek, United States	Giant slalom	8th

== World Championship results ==
Year
Year	Age	Slalom	Giant slalom	Super-G	Downhill	Combined	Team combined	Parallel	Team event
2021	26	—	DNF2	—	—	—	—N/a	DNFQ	—
2025	30	—	6	—	—	—N/a	—	—N/a	8

== Olympics results ==
Year
Year	Age	Slalom	Giant slalom	Super-G	Downhill	Combined	Team event
2022	27	—	5	—	—	—	—
