= Sebastian Holzmann =

German alpine skier (born 1993)

Personal information
- Born: 22 March 1993 (age 33) Bad Wörishofen, Bavaria, Germany
- Height: 1.83 m (6 ft 0 in)

Skiing career
- Sport: Alpine skiing
- Club: SC Oberstdorf
- Disciplines: Slalom
- World Cup debut: 6 January 2014 (age 20)

Olympics
- Teams: 0

World Championships
- Teams: 2 – (2021, 2023)
- Medals: 0

World Cup
- Seasons: 5 – (2016–)
- Podiums: 0
- Overall titles: 0 – (91st in 2018)
- Discipline titles: 0 – (29th in SL, 2018)

Sebastian Holzmann (born 22 March 1993) is a German World Cup alpine ski racer, and specializes in slalom.

== Career ==
Born in Bad Wörishofen, Bavaria, Holzman made his World Cup debut in January 2014 at age twenty and his best result is an eleventh place in March 2018 at Kranjska Gora.

He has competed in two World Championships, and finished fifth in the slalom event in 2023.

== World Cup results ==
=== Season standings ===
Season	Age	Overall	Slalom	Giant slalom	Super-G	Downhill	Combined	Parallel
2017	21	133	50	—	—	—	—	—N/a
2018	22	91	29	—	—	—	—	—N/a
2019	23	140	52	—	—	—	—	—N/a
2020	24	135	51	—	—	—	—	—
2021	25	91	32	—	—	—	—N/a	—
2022	28	—	—	—	—	—	—N/a	—
2023	29	82	30	—	—	—	—N/a	—N/a

Standings through 20 February 2023

=== Top fifteen results ===
- 0 podiums; 0 top tens; 11 top twenties

Season	Date	Location	Discipline	Place
2018	4 March 2018	Kranjska Gora, Slovenia	Slalom	11th

== World Championship results ==
Year	Age	Slalom	Giant slalom	Super-G	Downhill	Combined	Parallel	Team event
2021	27	DNF1	—	—	—	—	DNF	—
2023	29	5	—	—	—	—	24	—
