= Clément Noël =

French alpine skier (born 1997)

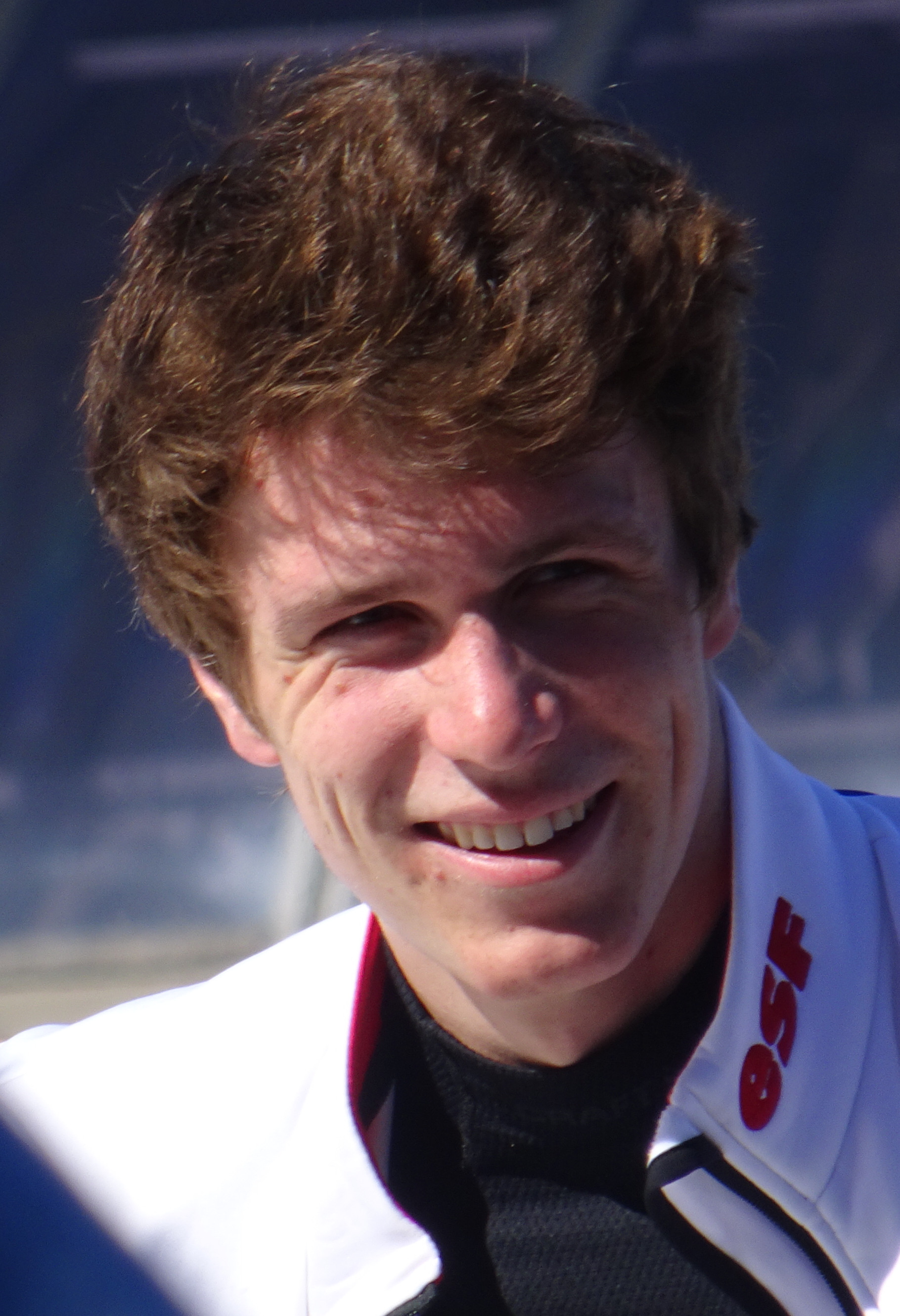
- March 2019

Personal information
- Born: 3 May 1997 (age 29) Remiremont, Vosges, France
- Height: 1.91 m (6 ft 3 in)

Skiing career
- Country: France
- Sport: Alpine skiing ♂
- Club: CS Val-d'Isère
- Disciplines: Slalom
- World Cup debut: 13 November 2016 (age 19)

Olympics
- Teams: 3 – (2018, 2022, 2026)
- Medals: 1 (1 gold)

World Championships
- Teams: 4 – (2019–2025)
- Medals: 0

World Cup
- Seasons: 10 – (2017–2026)
- Wins: 15 – (15 SL)
- Podiums: 34 – (34 SL)
- Overall titles: 0 – (8th in 2025)
- Discipline titles: 0 – (2nd in SL, 2019 2021, 2026)
Medal record
Men's alpine skiing
Representing France
Olympic Games
| Gold medal – first place | 2022 Beijing | Slalom |
Junior World Championships
| Gold medal – first place | 2018 Davos | Slalom |

Clément Noël (French pronunciation: [klemɑ̃ nɔɛl]; born 3 May 1997) is a French World Cup alpine ski racer who specializes in the slalom discipline. He competed in the 2018 Winter Olympics, placing fourth in the slalom, then became the gold medalist in slalom at the 2022 Winter Olympics.

== Biography ==
Noël is from the Remiremont commune in Vosges, in northeastern France.

In 2015, he joined the France B team and made his first World Cup debut in November 2016 at Levi, Finland. He became Champion of France of Slalom Elite with Lélex on March 26, 2017, and scored his first points in the World Cup by taking 20th place in the slalom at Val-d'Isère on December 10, 2017. He gained his first top ten by placing eighth in the slalom at Kitzbühel on 21 January 2018. A few weeks later, on 7 February, he won the slalom at the Junior World Championships at Davos, Switzerland.

Noël competed in his first Olympic Games at Pyeongchang in 2018 and just missed a medal, coming in fourth in the slalom. He gained his first World Cup podium eleven months later with a runner-up finish in the slalom at Adelboden on 13 January 2019. A week later he won his first race, a slalom in Wengen. At his first World Championships in February, he was seventh in the slalom.

Noël is a student at the University of Savoy.

== World Cup results ==
=== Season standings ===
Season
| Season | Age | Overall | Slalom | Giant slalom | Super-G | Downhill | Combined |
| 2018 | 20 | 44 | 18 | — | — | — | — |
| 2019 | 21 | 11 | 2 | — | — | — | — |
| 2020 | 22 | 12 | 2 | — | — | — | — |
| 2021 | 23 | 12 | 2 | 60 | — | — | —N/a |
| 2022 | 24 | 31 | 9 | — | — | — | —N/a |
| 2023 | 25 | 28 | 8 | — | — | — | —N/a |
| 2024 | 26 | 16 | 5 | — | — | — | —N/a |
| 2025 | 27 | 8 | 4 | — | — | — | —N/a |
| 2026 | 28 | 13 | 2 | — | — | — | —N/a |
| 2027 | 29 | 5 | 2 | — | — | — | —N/a |

Standings through 22 November 2026

=== Race podiums ===
| | Total | Slalom |
| Wins | 15 | 15 |
| Podiums | 34 | 34 |

Season
| Season | Date | Location | Discipline | Place |
| 2019 | 13 January 2019 | Adelboden, Switzerland | Slalom | 2nd |
| 2019 | 20 January 2019 | Wengen, Switzerland | Slalom | 1st |
| 2019 | 26 January 2019 | Kitzbühel, Austria | Slalom | 1st |
| 2019 | 16 March 2019 | Soldeu, Andorra | Slalom | 1st |
| 2020 | 24 November 2019 | Levi, Finland | Slalom | 2nd |
| 2020 | 5 January 2020 | Zagreb, Croatia | Slalom | 1st |
| 2020 | 8 January 2020 | Madonna di Campiglio, Italy | Slalom | 3rd |
| 2020 | 19 January 2020 | Wengen, Switzerland | Slalom | 1st |
| 2020 | 26 January 2020 | Kitzbühel, Austria | Slalom | 3rd |
| 2020 | 8 February 2020 | Chamonix, France | Slalom | 1st |
| 2021 | 16 January 2021 | Flachau, Austria | Slalom | 2nd |
| 2021 | 26 January 2021 | Schladming, Austria | Slalom | 2nd |
| 2021 | 30 January 2021 | Chamonix, France | Slalom | 1st |
| 2021 | 14 March 2021 | Kranjska Gora, Slovenia | Slalom | 1st |
| 2021 | 21 March 2021 | Lenzerheide, Switzerland | Slalom | 2nd |
| 2022 | 12 December 2021 | Val d'Isère, France | Slalom | 1st |
| 2022 | 9 March 2022 | Flachau, Austria | Slalom | 2nd |
| 2023 | 4 January 2023 | Garmish-Partenkirchen, Germany | Slalom | 3rd |
| 2023 | 24 January 2023 | Schladming, Austria | Slalom | 1st |
| 2023 | 26 February 2023 | Palisades Tahoe, United States | Slalom | 3rd |
| 2024 | 22 December 2023 | Madonna di Campiglio, Italy | Slalom | 2nd |
| 2024 | 24 January 2024 | Schladming, Austria | Slalom | 3rd |
| 2024 | 4 February 2024 | Chamonix, France | Slalom | 3rd |
| 2024 | 25 February 2024 | Palisades Tahoe, United States | Slalom | 2nd |
| 2025 | 17 November 2024 | Levi, Finland | Slalom | 1st |
| 2025 | 24 November 2024 | Gurgl, Austria | Slalom | 1st |
| 2025 | 11 January 2025 | Adelboden, Switzerland | Slalom | 1st |
| 2025 | 26 January 2025 | Kitzbühel, Austria | Slalom | 1st |
| 2025 | 27 March 2025 | Sun Valley, United States | Slalom | 2nd |
| 2026 | 16 November 2025 | Levi, Finland | Slalom | 2nd |
| 2026 | 22 December 2025 | Alta Badia, Italy | Slalom | 2nd |
| 2026 | 7 January 2026 | Madonna di Campiglio, Italy | Slalom | 1st |
| 2026 | 28 January 2026 | Schladming, Austria | Slalom | 3rd |
| 2027 | 15 November 2026 | Levi, Finland | Slalom | 2nd |

== World Championship results ==
Year
| Year | Age | Slalom | Giant slalom | Super-G | Downhill | Combined | Team combined | Parallel | Team event |
| 2019 | 21 | 7 | — | — | — | — | —N/a | —N/a | 5 |
| 2021 | 23 | 21 | — | — | — | — | —N/a | — | — |
| 2023 | 25 | 4 | — | — | — | — | —N/a | — | — |
| 2025 | 27 | DNF2 | — | — | — | —N/a | DNF2 | —N/a | — |

== Olympic results ==
Year
| Year | Age | Slalom | Giant slalom | Super-G | Downhill | Combined | Team combined | Team event |
| 2018 | 20 | 4 | — | — | — | — | —N/a | 4 |
| 2022 | 24 | 1 | — | — | — | — | —N/a | — |
| 2026 | 28 | DNF2 | — | — | — | —N/a | 5 | —N/a |
