= Michael Matt =

Austrian alpine skier (born 1993)

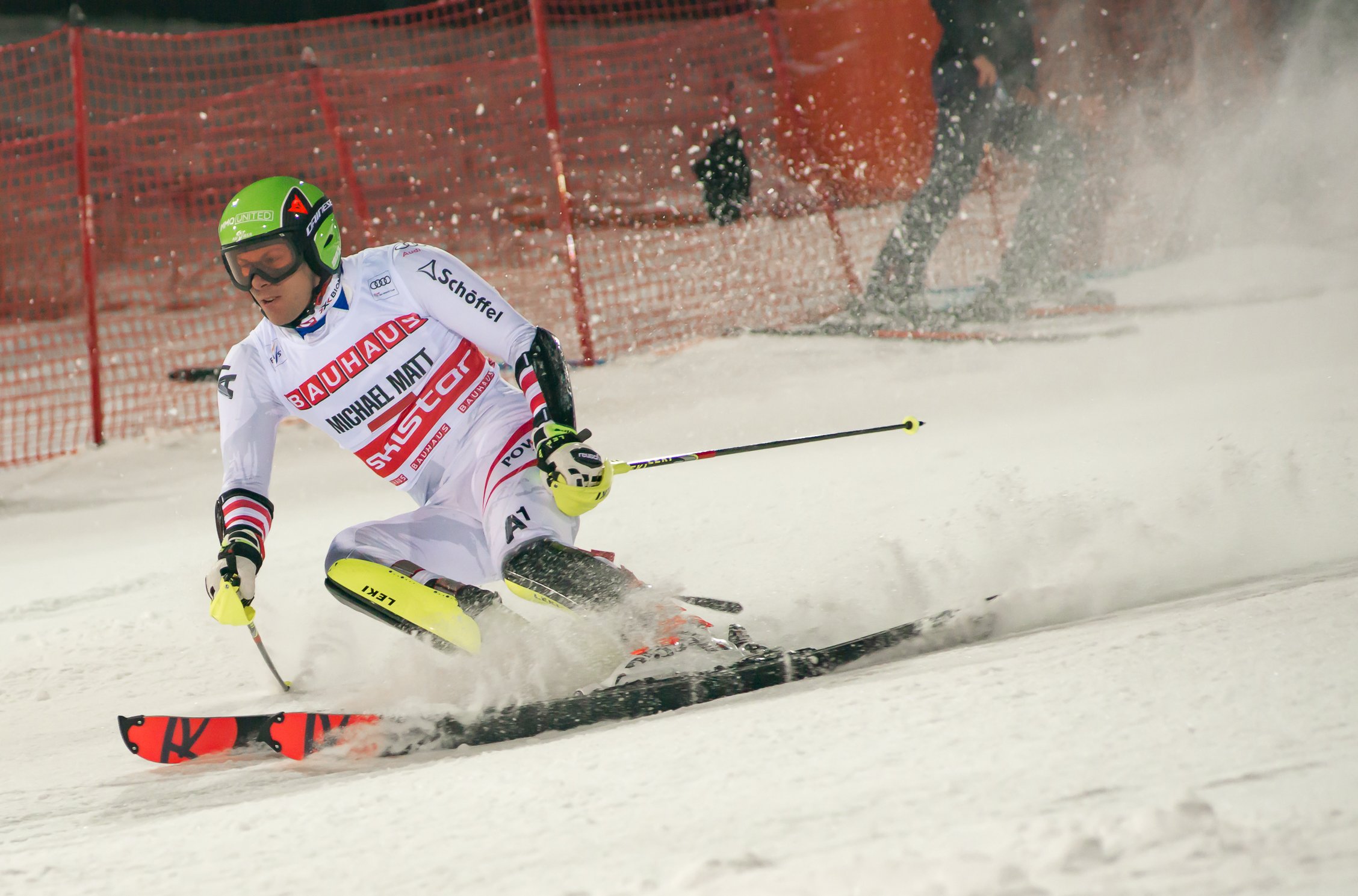
- Matt in 2018

Personal information
- Born: 13 May 1993 (age 33) Zams, Tyrol, Austria
- Height: 1.85 m (6 ft 1 in)
- Family: Mario Matt (brother); Andreas Matt (brother)

Skiing career
- Country: Austria
- Sport: Alpine skiing
- Club: SK Flirsch – Tirol
- Disciplines: Slalom
- World Cup debut: 17 November 2013 (age 20)

Olympics
- Teams: 3 – (2018, 2022, 2026)
- Medals: 3 (1 gold)

World Championships
- Teams: 4 – (2015–2021)
- Medals: 2 (0 gold)

World Cup
- Seasons: 13 – (2014–2026)
- Wins: 1 – (1 SL)
- Podiums: 8 – (7 SL, 1 PS)
- Overall titles: 0 – (18th in 2017)
- Discipline titles: 0 – (4th in SL, 2018)
Medal record
Men's alpine skiing
Representing Austria
Olympic Games
Gold medal – first place	2022 Beijing	Team event
Silver medal – second place	2018 Pyeongchang	Team event
Bronze medal – third place	2018 Pyeongchang	Slalom
World Championships
Silver medal – second place	2019 Åre	Slalom
Silver medal – second place	2019 Åre	Team event

Michael Matt (born 13 May 1993) is an Austrian World Cup alpine ski racer. He specialises in the slalom discipline and has competed in three Winter Olympics and four World Championships.

== Career ==
Matt made his World Cup debut at age 20 in the Levi slalom in November 2013, racing alongside his brother Mario. He competed at the 2015 World Championships in Beaver Creek, US. Matt raced in the slalom, but failed to finish the second run. Matt gained his first World Cup podium in Finland as the runner-up at Levi on 13 November 2016, and celebrated his first victory on 5 March 2017 in Slovenia at Kranjska Gora.

At the 2018 Winter Olympics in Pyongchang, South Korea, Matt finished the first run of the slalom competition in 12th place but moved up to third after the second run, securing himself the bronze medal. He was also part of the Austrian squad which took a silver medal in the team event.

== Personal life ==
Matt is the brother of double World and Olympic champion Mario Matt and ski cross world champion Andreas Matt. In 2001, at the age of eight, Michael Matt was buried by an avalanche.

== World Cup results ==
=== Season standings ===
Season
Season	Age	Overall	Slalom	Giant slalom	Super G	Downhill	Combined	Parallel
2015	21	124	42	—	—	—	—	—N/a
2016	22	84	27	—	—	—	—	—N/a
2017	23	18	5	—	—	—	—	—N/a
2018	24	19	4	54	—	—	—	—N/a
2019	25	31	11	—	—	—	—	—N/a
2020	26	38	9	—	—	—	—	34
2021	27	35	11	—	—	—	—N/a	30
2022	28	50	17	—	—	—	—N/a	—
2023	29	79	28	—	—	—	—N/a	—N/a
2024	30	57	21	—	—	—	—N/a	—N/a
2025	31	68	25	—	—	—	—N/a	—N/a
2026	32	33	12	—	—	—	—N/a	—N/a

=== Race podiums ===
- 1 win – (1 SL)
- 8 podiums – (7 SL, 1 PS)

Season
Season	Date	Location	Discipline	Place
2017	13 November 2016	Levi, Finland	Slalom	2nd
2017	5 March 2017	Kranjska Gora, Slovenia	Slalom	1st
2017	19 March 2017	Aspen, United States	Slalom	3rd
2018	1 January 2018	Oslo, Norway	Parallel slalom	2nd
2018	4 January 2018	Zagreb, Croatia	Slalom	2nd
2018	7 January 2018	Adelboden, Switzerland	Slalom	2nd
2019	22 December 2018	Madonna di Campiglio, Italy	Slalom	3rd
2024	18 November 2023	Gurgl, Austria	Slalom	3rd

== World Championship results ==
Year
Year	Age	Slalom	Giant slalom	Super-G	Downhill	Combined	Team event
2015	21	DNF2	—	—	—	—	—
2017	23	8	—	—	—	—	—
2019	25	2	—	—	—	—	2
2021	27	9	—	—	—	—	—

== Olympic results ==
Year
Year	Age	Slalom	Giant slalom	Super G	Downhill	Combined	Team combined	Team event
2018	24	3	—	—	—	—	—N/a	2
2022	28	DNF2	—	—	—	—	—N/a	1
2026	32	8	—	—	—	—N/a	4	—N/a

== See also ==
- List of Olympic medalist families
