= Andreas Sander =

German alpine skier (born 1989)

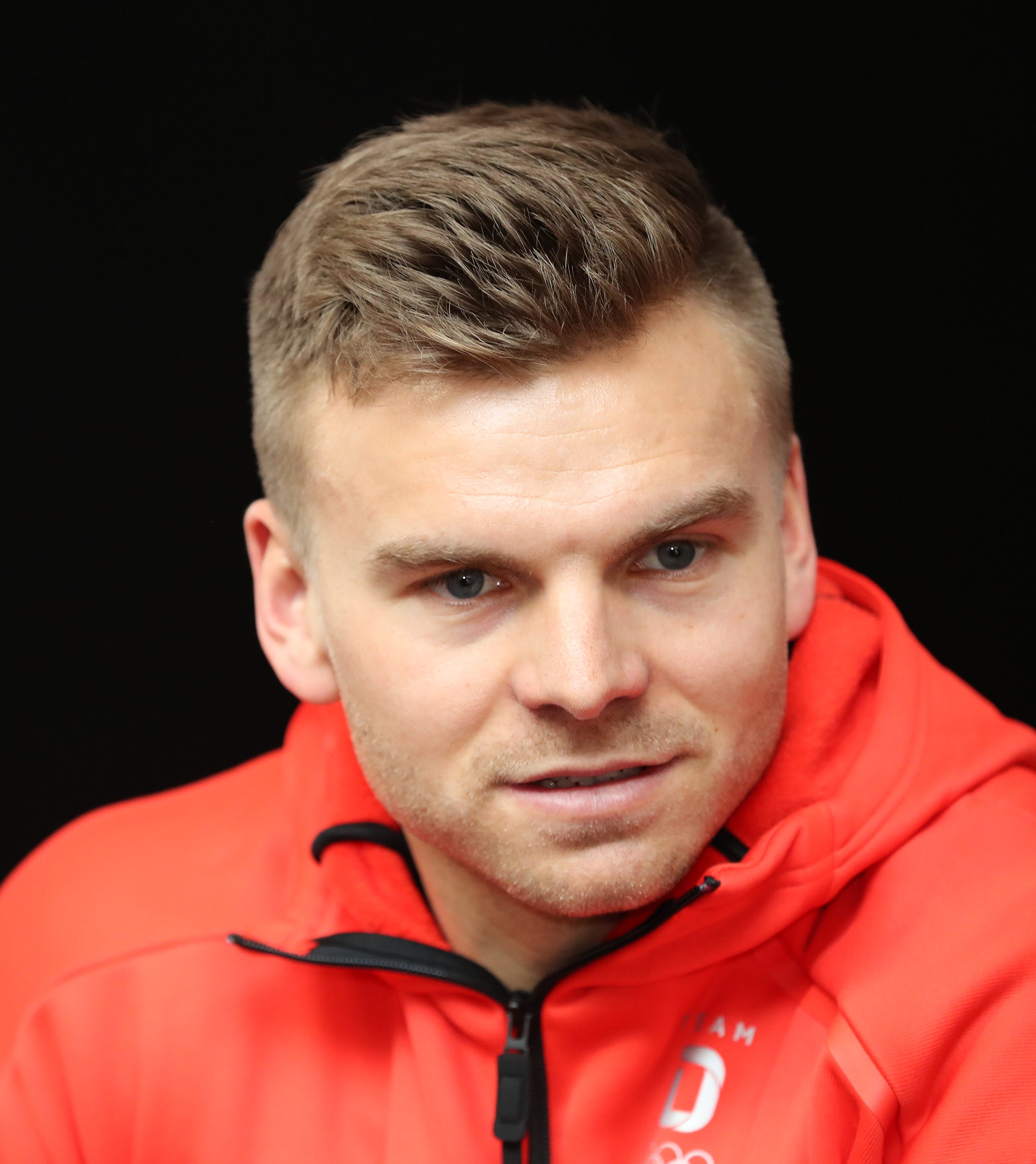
- Sander in 2018

Personal information
- Born: 13 June 1989 (age 37) Schwelm, West Germany
- Height: 1.78 m (5 ft 10 in)
- Website: www.andreas-sander.com

Skiing career
- Sport: Alpine skiing
- Club: SG Ennepetal
- Disciplines: Downhill, Super-G, Combined
- World Cup debut: 13 March 2008 (age 18)

Olympics
- Teams: 2 – (2018, 2022)
- Medals: 0

World Championships
- Teams: 5 – (2011, 2015, 2017, 2021, 2023)
- Medals: 1 (0 gold)

World Cup
- Seasons: 12 – (2008–09, 2011–2023)
- Wins: 0
- Podiums: 2 – (1 SG, 1 DH)
- Overall titles: 0 – (15th in 2023)
- Discipline titles: 0 – (4th in SG in 2023)
Medal record
Men's alpine skiing
Representing Germany
World Championships
Silver medal – second place	2021 Cortina d’Ampezzo	Downhill

Andreas Sander (born 13 June 1989) is a former German World Cup alpine ski racer. He specializes in the speed events of downhill and super-G.

== Career ==
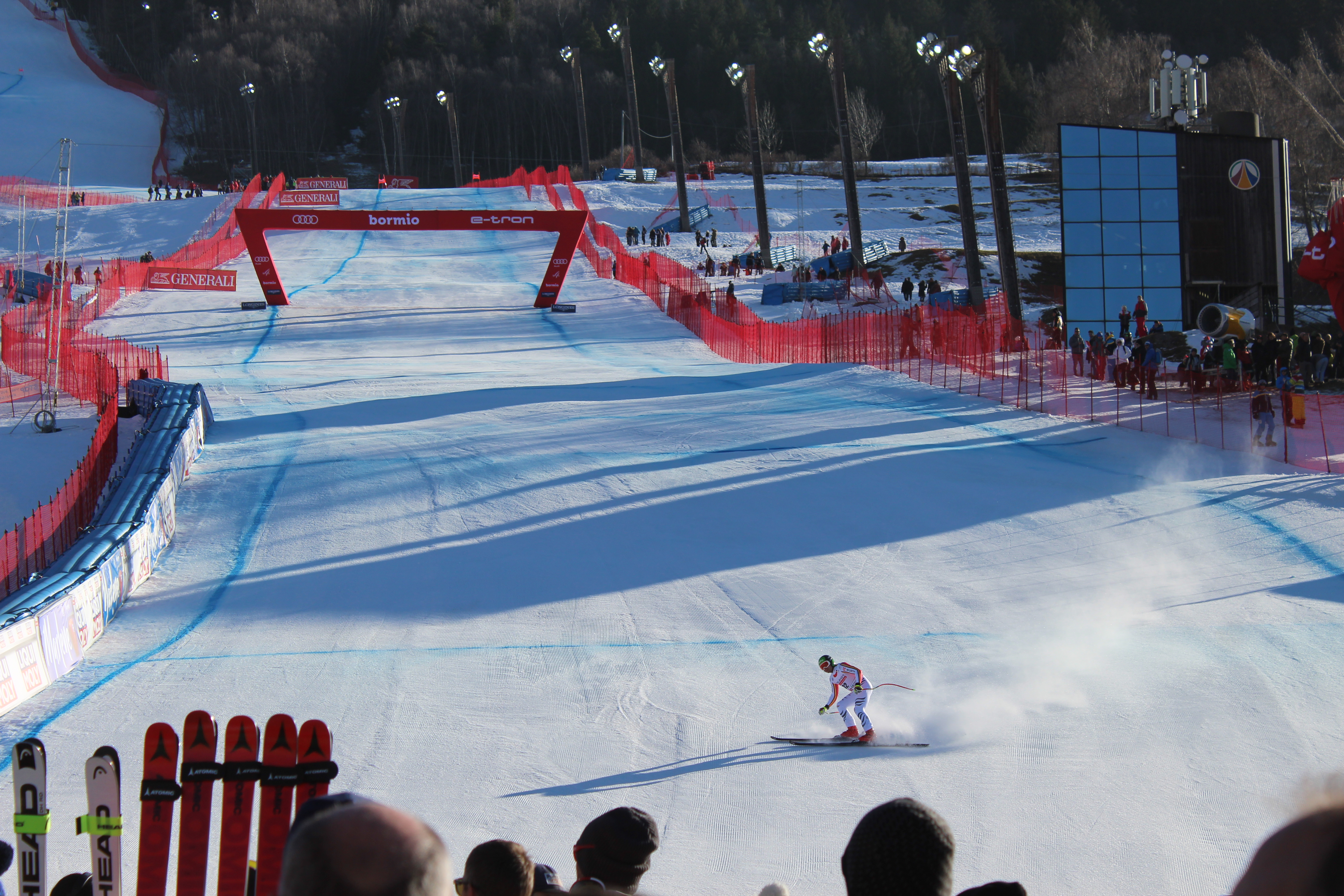
Sander at Bormio in December 2019

On 13 March 2008, Sander made his World Cup debut in the Bormio Super-G. In December 2010, he scored his first World Cup points in the Val Gardena downhill, finishing in 28th place. Sander competed at the 2011 World Championships in Garmisch-Partenkirchen, Germany, in the Super-G and Downhill. He competed at the 2015 World Championships in Beaver Creek, USA, in the super-G, downhill, and combined. On 29 December 2015, he scored his first Top 10 World Cup result in the Santa Caterina Downhill, finishing in 10th place.

Sander won the silver medal in the downhill at the World Championships in 2021 at Cortina d'Ampezzo. His first World Cup podium came in March 2023 with a runner-up finish in the super-G at Aspen.

== World Cup results ==
=== Season standings ===
Season
Season	Age	Overall	Slalom	Giant; Slalom	Super-G	Downhill	Combined	Parallel
2011	21	161	—	—	—	59	—	—N/a
2012	22	80	—	—	46	35	32	—N/a
2013	23	120	—	—	52	49	29	—N/a
2015	25	93	—	—	43	37	—	—N/a
2016	26	31	—	—	15	25	25	—N/a
2017	27	35	—	—	12	22	—	—N/a
2018	28	27	—	—	11	13	—	—N/a
2019	29	93	—	—	24	47	—	—N/a
2020	30	37	—	—	13	30	—	—
2021	31	20	—	—	6	10	—N/a	—
2022	32	46	—	—	12	33	—N/a	—
2023	33	15	—	—	4	16	—N/a	—N/a

=== Top five results ===
- 0 wins
- 2 podiums (1 SG, 1 DH); 8 top fives (6 SG, 2 DH); 33 top tens

Season
Season	Date	Location	Discipline	Rank
2017	16 December 2016	Val Gardena, Italy	Super-G	5th
2021	18 December 2020	Val Gardena, Italy	Super-G	5th
2021	22 January 2021	Kitzbühel, Austria	Downhill	5th
2022	2 December 2021	(United States) Beaver Creek, USA	Super-G	4th
2023	27 November 2022	Lake Louise, Canada	Super-G	5th
2023	29 January 2023	Cortina d'Ampezzo, Italy	Super-G	4th
2023	5 March 2023	(United States) Aspen, USA	Super-G	2nd
2023	15 March 2023	Soldeu, Andorra	Downhill	3rd

== World Championship results ==
Year
Year	Age	Slalom	Giant; Slalom	Super-G	Downhill	Combined
2011	21	—	—	21	DNF	—
2015	25	—	—	23	17	23
2017	27	—	—	7	8	23
2021	31	—	—	9	2	—
2023	33	—	—	9	29	DNS2

== Olympic Games results ==
Year
Year	Age	Slalom	Giant; Slalom	Super-G	Downhill	Combined
2018	29	—	—	10	8	DNF
2022	33	—	—	8	17	—
