= Filip Zubčić =

Croatian alpine skier (born 1993)

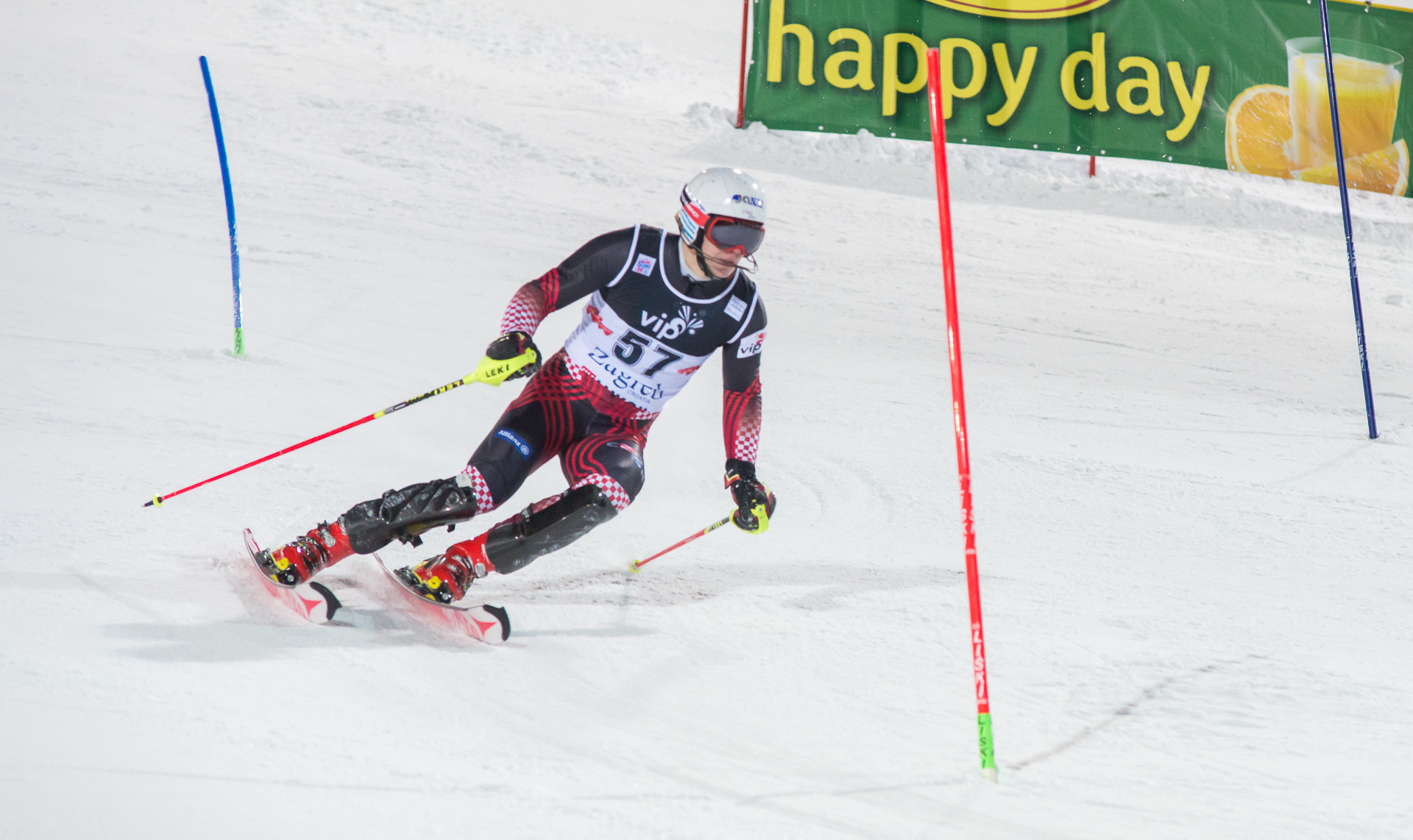
- Filip Zubčić at Zagreb in 2015

Personal information
- Born: 27 January 1993 (age 33) Zagreb, Croatia
- Height: 1.81 m (5 ft 11 in)

Skiing career
- Country: Croatia
- Sport: Alpine skiing
- Club: SK Končar
- Disciplines: Giant slalom, slalom
- World Cup debut: 28 October 2012 (age 19)

Olympics
- Teams: 4 – (2014–2026)
- Medals: 0

World Championships
- Teams: 8 – (2011–2025)
- Medals: 1 (0 gold)

World Cup
- Seasons: 14 – (2013–2026)
- Wins: 3 – (3 GS)
- Podiums: 13 – (12 GS, 1 SL)
- Overall titles: 0 – (5th in 2021)
- Discipline titles: 0 – (3rd in GS: 2020, 2021, 2024)
Medal record
Men's alpine skiing
Representing Croatia
World Cup race podiums
Event	1st	2nd	3rd
Slalom	0	0	1
Giant	3	6	2
Total	3	6	3
World Championships
Silver medal – second place	2021 Cortina d'Ampezzo	Parallel

Filip Zubčić (Croatian pronunciation: [fǐlip zǔptʃitɕ]; born 27 January 1993) is a Croatian World Cup alpine ski racer who specializes in giant slalom. He has competed in three Winter Olympics and eight World Championships. Zubčić finished third in season standings in giant slalom in seasons 2020, 2021, and 2024.

== World Cup results ==
=== Season standings ===
Season
Season	Age	Overall	Slalom	Giant slalom	Super-G	Downhill	Combined	Parallel
2015	22	83	41	25	—	—	—	—N/a
2016	23	78	—	28	—	—	32	—N/a
2017	24	75	—	26	—	—	32	—N/a
2018	25	68	—	21	—	—	—	—N/a
2019	26	60	52	27	—	—	12	—N/a
2020	27	14	32	3	—	—	30	18
2021	28	5	24	3	—	—	—N/a	10
2022	29	23	22	14	—	—	—N/a	24
2023	30	26	27	10	—	—	—N/a	—N/a
2024	31	10	28	3	—	—	—N/a	—N/a
2025	32	16	20	9	—	—	—N/a	—N/a
2026	33	39	32	19	—	—	—N/a	—N/a

=== Race podiums ===
- 3 wins – (3 GS)
- 13 podiums – (12 GS, 1 SL), 49 top tens

Season
Season	Date	Location	Discipline	Place
2020	11 January 2020	Adelboden, Switzerland	Giant slalom	2nd
2020	22 February 2020	Yuzawa Naeba, Japan	Giant slalom	1st
2020	2 March 2020	Hinterstoder, Austria	Giant slalom	2nd
2021	5 December 2020	Santa Caterina, Italy	Giant slalom	1st
2021	7 December 2020	Santa Caterina, Italy	Giant slalom	3rd
2021	8 January 2021	Adelboden, Switzerland	Giant slalom	2nd
2021	9 January 2021	Adelboden, Switzerland	Giant slalom	2nd
2021	27 February 2021	Bansko, Bulgaria	Giant slalom	1st
2021	20 March 2021	Lenzerheide, Switzerland	Giant slalom	2nd
2022	12 December 2021	Val d'Isère, France	Slalom	3rd
2024	17 December 2023	Alta Badia, Italy	Giant slalom	2nd
2024	6 January 2024	Adelboden, Switzerland	Giant slalom	3rd
2026	28 November 2025	Copper Mountain, United States	Giant slalom	3rd

== World Championship results ==
Year
Year	Age	Slalom	Giant slalom	Super-G	Downhill	Combined	Team combined	Parallel	Team event
2011	18	30	—	—	—	—	—N/a	—N/a	—
2013	20	DNF2	28	—	—	—	—N/a	—N/a	9
2015	22	13	16	—	—	—	—N/a	—N/a	9
2017	24	—	19	31	—	DNF2	—N/a	—N/a	9
2019	26	26	19	29	DNS	40	—N/a	—N/a	—
2021	28	DNF2	4	—	—	—	—N/a	2	—
2023	30	11	8	—	—	—	—N/a	—	—
2025	32	DNF1	13	—	—	—N/a	—	—N/a	—

== Olympic results ==
Year
Year	Age	Slalom	Giant slalom	Super-G	Downhill	Combined	Team combined	Team event
2014	21	—	DNF1	—	—	—	—N/a	—N/a
2018	25	DNF1	24	DNF	—	12	—N/a	—
2022	29	18	10	—	—	—	—N/a	—
2026	33	13	14	—	—	—N/a	—	—N/a
