= Loïc Meillard =

Swiss alpine skier (born 1996)

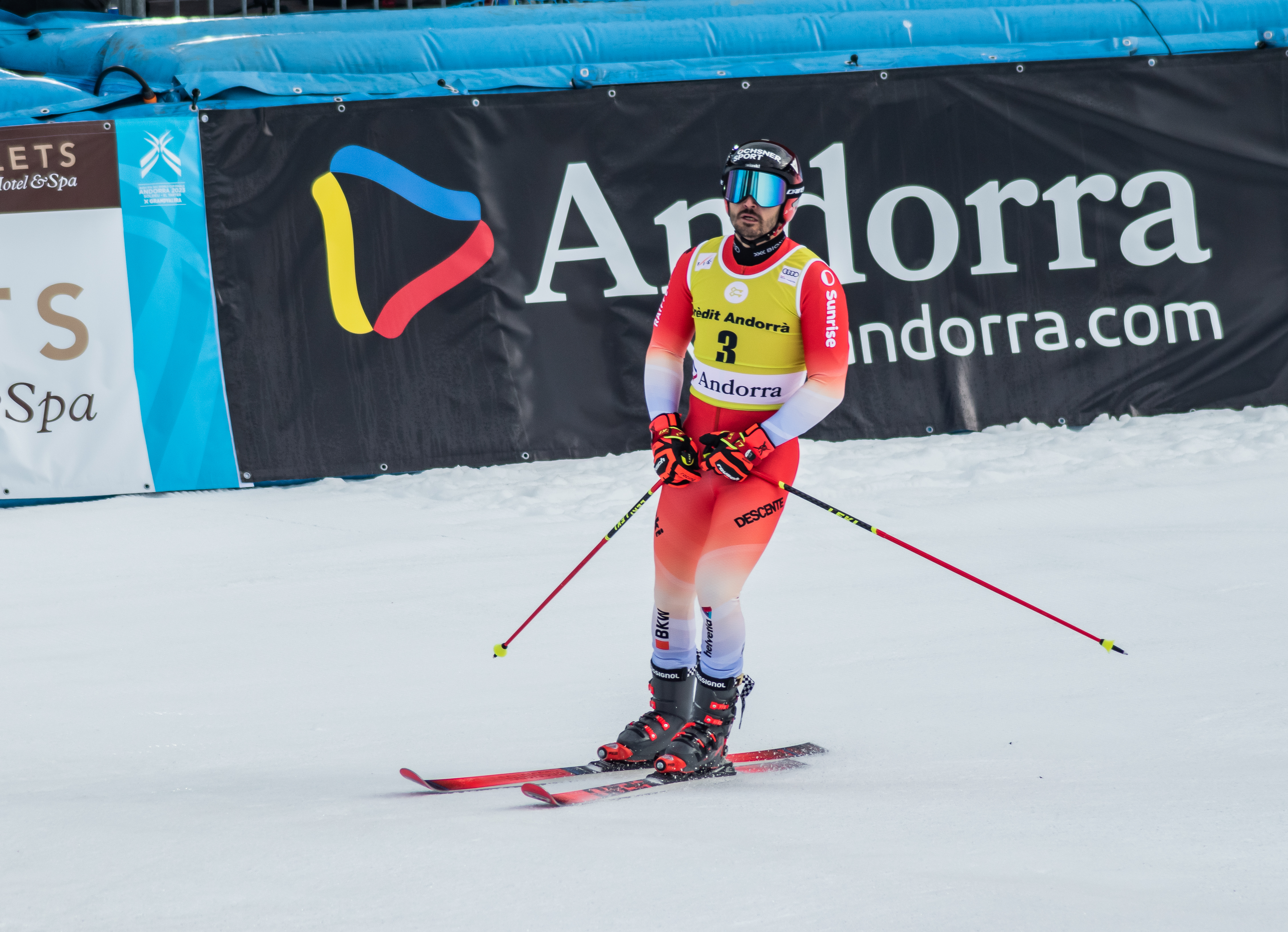
- At Soldeu in 2023

Personal information
- Born: 29 October 1996 (age 30) Neuchâtel, Switzerland
- Height: 1.82 m (6 ft 0 in)
- Family: Mélanie Meillard (sister)
- Website: loicmeillard.ch

Skiing career
- Country: Switzerland
- Sport: Alpine skiing
- Club: Heremencia
- Disciplines: Slalom, giant slalom, combined, super-G
- World Cup debut: 10 January 2015 (age 18)

Olympics
- Teams: 3 – (2018, 2022, 2026)
- Medals: 3 (1 gold)

World Championships
- Teams: 5 – (2017–2025)
- Medals: 6 (2 gold)

World Cup
- Seasons: 12 – (2015–2026)
- Wins: 9 – (6 GS, 2 SL, 1 PG)
- Podiums: 39 – (18 GS, 16 SL, 3 SG, 1 AC, 1 PG)
- Overall titles: 0 – (2nd in 2024)
- Discipline titles: 1 – (PAR, 2020)
Medal record
Men's alpine skiing
Representing Switzerland
World Cup race podiums
| Event | 1st | 2nd | 3rd |
|---|---|---|---|
| Slalom | 2 | 9 | 5 |
| Giant slalom | 6 | 9 | 3 |
| Super-G | 0 | 1 | 2 |
| Combined | 0 | 0 | 1 |
| Parallel | 1 | 0 | 0 |
| Total | 9 | 19 | 11 |
Olympic Games
| Gold medal – first place | 2026 Milano Cortina | Slalom |
| Silver medal – second place | 2026 Milano Cortina | Team combined |
| Bronze medal – third place | 2026 Milano Cortina | Giant slalom |
World Championships
| Gold medal – first place | 2025 Saalbach | Slalom |
| Gold medal – first place | 2025 Saalbach | Team combined |
| Silver medal – second place | 2023 Courchevel | Giant slalom |
| Bronze medal – third place | 2021 Cortina d'Ampezzo | Combined |
| Bronze medal – third place | 2021 Cortina d'Ampezzo | Parallel |
| Bronze medal – third place | 2025 Saalbach | Giant slalom |
Junior World Championships
| Gold medal – first place | 2015 Hafjell | Combined |
| Gold medal – first place | 2017 Åre | Giant slalom |
| Gold medal – first place | 2017 Åre | Combined |
| Silver medal – second place | 2015 Hafjell | Giant slalom |
| Bronze medal – third place | 2015 Hafjell | Super-G |

Loïc Meillard (French pronunciation: [lɔik mɛjaʁ]; born 29 October 1996) is a Swiss World Cup alpine ski racer and specializes in the technical events of slalom and giant slalom. Born in Neuchâtel, Meillard made his World Cup debut in January 2015. He is the men's slalom champion at the 2026 Winter Olympics. He also won silver for team combined ski and bronze in giant slalom at that Olympic edition.

== Career ==
Meillard made his World Cup debut at age 18 in the Adelboden giant slalom in January 2015. At the Junior World Championships that March at Hafjell, Norway, he won a bronze medal in the super-G, silver in the giant slalom, and gold in the combined.

In February 2016, Meillard scored his first World Cup points at the Hinterstoder giant slalom, finishing in 27th place, and his first top ten (eighth) came the following week at Kranjska Gora. His first podium was a runner-up in a giant slalom in December 2018 at Saalbach-Hinterglemm, Austria. On the same hill the next day, Meillard finished second in the slalom, runner-up to Marcel Hirscher.

At his third World Championships in 2021, Meillard won two bronze medals, in parallel giant slalom and combined, and was fifth in the giant slalom.

Meillard won the gold medal in the slalom at the 2025 World Championships in Saalbach-Hinterglemm, becoming the first Swiss man to take the title for 75 years.

== Personal life ==
Meillard has a younger sister, Mélanie, who is also a World Cup alpine racer.

== World Cup results ==
=== Season titles ===
- 1 title – (1 PAR)

| Season | |
| Season | Discipline |
| 2020 | Parallel |

=== Season standings ===
Season
| Season | Age | Overall | Slalom | Giant slalom | Super-G | Downhill | Combined | Parallel |
| 2016 | 19 | 104 | — | 38 | — | — | — | —N/a |
| 2017 | 20 | 79 | 42 | 30 | — | — | — | —N/a |
| 2018 | 21 | 27 | 22 | 9 | — | — | — | —N/a |
| 2019 | 22 | 15 | 16 | 5 | — | — | 18 | —N/a |
| 2020 | 23 | 10 | 14 | 11 | — | — | 5 | 1 |
| 2021 | 24 | 4 | 9 | 4 | 20 | — | —N/a | — |
| 2022 | 25 | 11 | 7 | 8 | 30 | — | —N/a | — |
| 2023 | 26 | 6 | 6 | 6 | 16 | — | —N/a | —N/a |
| 2024 | 27 | 2 | 4 | 2 | 8 | — | —N/a | —N/a |
| 2025 | 28 | 3 | 2 | 3 | 35 | — | —N/a | —N/a |
| 2026 | 29 | 4 | 6 | 3 | 27 | — | —N/a | —N/a |
| 2027 | 30 | 2 | 3 | 2 | — | — | —N/a | —N/a |

Standings through 15 November 2026

=== Race podiums ===
- 9 wins – (6 GS, 2 SL, 1 PG)
- 39 podiums – (18 GS, 16 SL, 3 SG, 1 AC, 1 PG)

Season
| Season | Date | Location | Discipline | Place |
| 2019 | 19 December 2018 | Saalbach, Austria | Giant slalom | 2nd |
| 2019 | 20 December 2018 | Saalbach, Austria | Slalom | 2nd |
| 2020 | 29 December 2019 | Bormio, Italy | Combined | 3rd |
| 2020 | 2 February 2020 | Garmisch-Partenkirchen, Germany | Giant slalom | 2nd |
| 2020 | 9 February 2020 | Chamonix, France | Parallel-G | 1st |
| 2021 | 9 January 2021 | Adelboden, Switzerland | Giant slalom | 3rd |
| 2021 | 13 March 2021 | Kranjska Gora, Slovenia | Giant slalom | 2nd |
| 2022 | 26 February 2022 | Garmisch-Partenkirchen, Germany | Slalom | 2nd |
| 2022 | 19 March 2022 | Méribel, France | Giant slalom | 3rd |
| 2023 | 11 December 2022 | Val d'Isère, France | Slalom | 3rd |
| 2023 | 29 December 2022 | Bormio, Italy | Super-G | 3rd |
| 2023 | 7 January 2023 | Adelboden, Switzerland | Giant slalom | 3rd |
| 2023 | 15 January 2023 | Wengen, Switzerland | Slalom | 2nd |
| 2023 | 25 January 2023 | Schladming, Austria | Giant slalom | 1st |
| 2024 | 27 January 2024 | Garmisch-Partenkirchen, Germany | Super-G | 3rd |
| 2024 | 4 February 2024 | Chamonix, France | Slalom | 2nd |
| 2024 | 1 March 2024 | Aspen, United States | Giant slalom | 2nd |
| 2024 | 2 March 2024 | Aspen, United States | Giant slalom | 2nd |
| 2024 | 3 March 2024 | Aspen, United States | Slalom | 1st |
| 2024 | 16 March 2024 | Saalbach, Austria | Giant slalom | 1st |
| 2024 | 22 March 2024 | Saalbach, Austria | Super-G | 2nd |
| 2025 | 17 November 2024 | Levi, Finland | Slalom | 3rd |
| 2025 | 15 December 2024 | Val d'Isère, France | Slalom | 3rd |
| 2025 | 23 December 2024 | Alta Badia, Italy | Slalom | 2nd |
| 2025 | 8 January 2025 | Madonna di Campiglio, Italy | Slalom | 2nd |
| 2025 | 12 January 2025 | Adelboden, Switzerland | Giant slalom | 2nd |
| 2025 | 15 March 2025 | Hafjell, Norway | Giant slalom | 1st |
| 2025 | 16 March 2025 | Hafjell, Norway | Slalom | 1st |
| 2025 | 26 March 2025 | Sun Valley, United States | Giant slalom | 1st |
| 2026 | 13 December 2025 | Val d'Isère, France | Giant slalom | 1st |
| 2026 | 14 December 2025 | Val d'Isère, France | Slalom | 2nd |
| 2026 | 22 December 2025 | Alta Badia, Italy | Slalom | 3rd |
| 2026 | 25 January 2026 | Kitzbühel, Austria | Slalom | 2nd |
| 2026 | 27 January 2026 | Schladming, Austria | Giant slalom | 1st |
| 2026 | 7 March 2026 | Kranjska Gora, Slovenia | Giant slalom | 2nd |
| 2026 | 24 March 2026 | Hafjell, Norway | Giant slalom | 2nd |
| 2026 | 25 March 2026 | Hafjell, Norway | Slalom | 2nd |
| 2027 | 25 October 2026 | Sölden, Austria | Giant slalom | 2nd |
| 2027 | 15 November 2026 | Levi, Finland | Slalom | 3rd |

== World Championship results ==
Year
| Year | Age | Slalom | Giant slalom | Super-G | Downhill | Combined | Team combined | Parallel |
| 2017 | 20 | — | 21 | — | — | — | —N/a | —N/a |
| 2019 | 22 | 14 | 4 | — | — | — | —N/a | —N/a |
| 2021 | 24 | DNF1 | 5 | DNF | — | 3 | —N/a | 3 |
| 2023 | 26 | DNF1 | 2 | 8 | — | 6 | —N/a | — |
| 2025 | 28 | 1 | 3 | — | — | —N/a | 1 | —N/a |

== Olympic results ==
Year
| Year | Age | Slalom | Giant slalom | Super-G | Downhill | Combined | Team combined |
| 2018 | 21 | 14 | 9 | — | — | — | —N/a |
| 2022 | 25 | 5 | DNF1 | — | — | DNF2 (SL) | —N/a |
| 2026 | 29 | 1 | 3 | — | — | —N/a | 2 |
