= Manuel Feller =

Austrian alpine skier (born 1992)

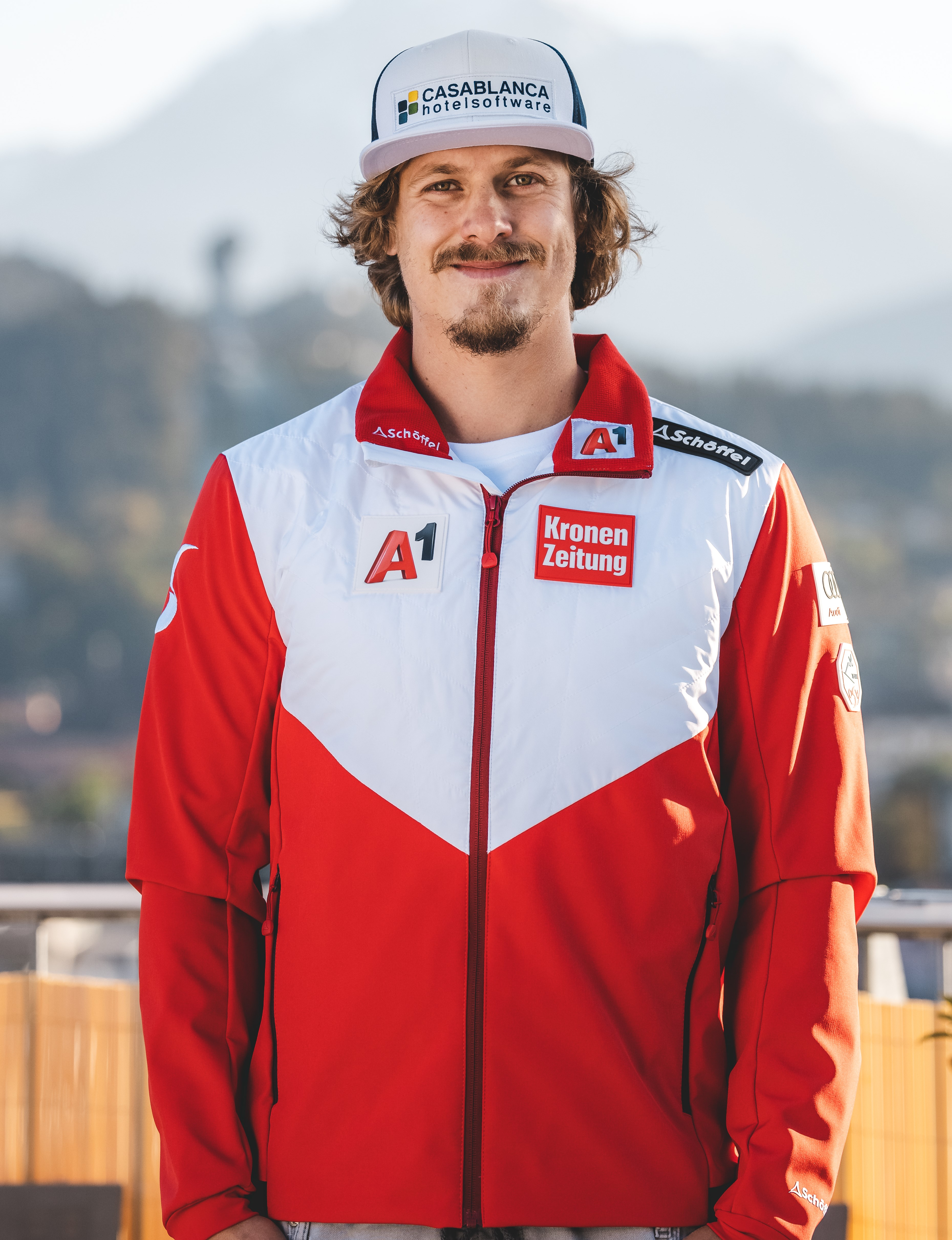
- Feller in 2021

Personal information
- Born: 13 October 1992 (age 34) Fieberbrunn, Tyrol, Austria
- Height: 1.83 m (6 ft 0 in)

Skiing career
- Country: Austria
- Sport: Alpine skiing
- Club: SC Fieberbrunn – Tirol
- Disciplines: Slalom, giant slalom
- World Cup debut: 11 November 2012 (age 20)

Olympics
- Teams: 3 – (2018, 2022, 2026)
- Medals: 2 (0 gold)

World Championships
- Teams: 4 – (2017–2023)
- Medals: 1 (0 gold)

World Cup
- Seasons: 11 – (2013–2026)
- Wins: 7 – (7 SL)
- Podiums: 28 – (21 SL, 7 GS)
- Overall titles: 0 – (3rd in 2024)
- Discipline titles: 1 – (SL, 2024)
Medal record
Men's alpine skiing
Representing Austria
World Cup race podiums
| Event | 1st | 2nd | 3rd |
|---|---|---|---|
| Slalom | 7 | 9 | 5 |
| Giant slalom | 0 | 4 | 3 |
| Total | 7 | 13 | 8 |
Olympic Games
| Silver medal – second place | 2018 Pyeongchang | Team event |
| Silver medal – second place | 2026 Milano Cortina | Team combined |
World Championships
| Silver medal – second place | 2017 St. Moritz | Slalom |
World Junior Championships
| Gold medal – first place | 2013 Mont-Sainte-Anne | Slalom |

Manuel Feller (born 13 October 1992) is an Austrian World Cup alpine ski racer. He specializes in the technical events of slalom and giant slalom, and made his World Cup debut in November 2012.

In 2024, Feller won his first World Cup discipline title in slalom.

== World Cup results ==
=== Season standings ===
Season
| Season | Age | Overall | Slalom | Giant slalom | Super-G | Downhill | Combined |
| 2013 | 20 | 83 | 30 | — | — | — | — |
| 2014 | 21 | 66 | 22 | — | — | — | — |
| 2015 | 22 | injured after two races | | | | | |
| 2016 | 23 | 32 | 21 | 13 | — | — | — |
| 2017 | 24 | 31 | 21 | 16 | — | — | — |
| 2018 | 25 | 13 | 17 | 4 | — | — | — |
| 2019 | 26 | 10 | 8 | 14 | — | — | — |
| 2020 | 27 | 58 | 26 | 27 | — | — | — |
| 2021 | 28 | 10 | 4 | 23 | — | — | —N/a |
| 2022 | 29 | 7 | 2 | 3 | — | — | —N/a |
| 2023 | 30 | 9 | 5 | 12 | — | — | —N/a |
| 2024 | 31 | 3 | 1 | 9 | — | — | —N/a |
| 2025 | 32 | 21 | 9 | 33 | — | — | —N/a |
| 2026 | 33 | 29 | 10 | — | — | — | —N/a |

=== Race podiums ===
- 7 wins – (7 SL)
- 28 podiums – (21 SL, 7 GS)

Season
| Season | Date | Location | Discipline | Place |
| 2018 | 28 January 2018 | Garmisch-Partenkirchen, Germany | Giant slalom | 2nd |
| 2019 | 6 January 2019 | Zagreb, Croatia | Slalom | 3rd |
| 2019 | 20 January 2019 | Wengen, Switzerland | Slalom | 2nd |
| 2019 | 17 March 2019 | Soldeu, Andorra | Slalom | 2nd |
| 2021 | 21 December 2020 | Alta Badia, Italy | Slalom | 2nd |
| 2021 | 6 January 2021 | Zagreb, Croatia | Slalom | 2nd |
| 2021 | 16 January 2021 | Flachau, Austria | Slalom | 1st |
| 2021 | 21 March 2021 | Lenzerheide, Switzerland | Slalom | 1st |
| 2022 | 11 December 2021 | Val d'Isère, France | Giant slalom | 3rd |
| 2022 | 19 December 2021 | Alta Badia, Italy | Giant slalom | 3rd |
| 2022 | 8 January 2022 | Adelboden, Switzerland | Giant slalom | 2nd |
| 2022 | 9 January 2022 | Adelboden, Switzerland | Slalom | 2nd |
| 2022 | 25 January 2022 | Schladming, Austria | Slalom | 3rd |
| 2022 | 26 February 2022 | Garmisch-Partenkirchen, Germany | Slalom | 3rd |
| 2022 | 20 March 2022 | Méribel, France | Slalom | 3rd |
| 2023 | 10 December 2022 | Val d'Isère, France | Giant slalom | 2nd |
| 2023 | 11 December 2022 | Val d'Isère, France | Slalom | 2nd |
| 2023 | 4 January 2023 | Garmisch-Partenkirchen, Germany | Slalom | 2nd |
| 2024 | 18 November 2023 | Gurgl, Austria | Slalom | 1st |
| 2024 | 7 January 2024 | Adelboden, Switzerland | Slalom | 1st |
| 2024 | 14 January 2024 | Wengen, Switzerland | Slalom | 1st |
| 2024 | 23 January 2024 | Schladming, Austria | Giant slalom | 2nd |
| 2024 | 10 February 2024 | Bansko, Bulgaria | Giant slalom | 3rd |
| 2024 | 25 February 2024 | Palisades Tahoe, United States | Slalom | 1st |
| 2024 | 17 March 2025 | Saalbach, Austria | Slalom | 2nd |
| 2025 | 29 January 2025 | Schladming, Austria | Slalom | 2nd |
| 2025 | 2 March 2025 | Kranjska Gora, Slovenia | Slalom | 3rd |
| 2026 | 25 January 2026 | Kitzbühel, Austria | Slalom | 1st |

== World Championship results ==
Year
| Year | Age | Slalom | Giant slalom | Super-G | Downhill | Combined | Team combined | Parallel | Team event |
| 2017 | 24 | 2 | DNS2 | — | — | — | —N/a | —N/a | 5 |
| 2019 | 26 | 6 | 15 | — | — | — | —N/a | —N/a | — |
| 2021 | 28 | DNF2 | DNF1 | — | — | — | —N/a | — | — |
| 2023 | 30 | 7 | DNF2 | — | — | — | —N/a | — | — |
| 2025 | 32 | 4 | — | — | — | —N/a | DNF2 | —N/a | — |

== Olympic results ==
Year
| Year | Age | Slalom | Giant slalom | Super-G | Downhill | Combined | Team combined | Team event |
| 2018 | 25 | 15 | DSQ1 | — | — | — | —N/a | 2 |
| 2022 | 29 | DNF1 | DNF2 | — | — | — | —N/a | — |
| 2026 | 33 | DNF1 | — | — | — | —N/a | 2 | —N/a |

== Junior World Championships ==
At the World Junior Championships in 2012, Feller finished 27th in the downhill, 14th in the giant slalom, and failed to finish the slalom. The next year in Quebec, Feller won the gold medal in the slalom, ahead of medalists Ramon Zenhaeusern and Santeri Paloniemi, and was ninth in the giant slalom.
