= Kirchenkar =

Ski course in Austria

Coordinates: 46°54′24″N 11°03′51″E

- Interactive map of Kirchenkar
- Location within Austria
- Location: Gurgl, Sölden, Tyrol, Austria

Slalom
- Start: 2,475 m (8,120 ft) (AA)
- Finish: 2,265 m (7,431 ft)
- Vertical drop: 210 m (689 ft)

Kirchenkar is a World Cup slalom ski course in Austria in Gurgl, municipality of Sölden, Tyrol. The race course made its World Cup debut three years ago in November 2023 with a men's slalom, won by Austrian Manuel Feller.

With an average gradient of 41% (max 60% and min 9%), Kirchenkar is among the steepest slopes on the World Cup circuit.

== World Cup ==
=== Men ===
No.	Season	Date	Winner	Second	Third
1893	2023/24	18 November 2023	(Austria) Manuel Feller	(Austria) Marco Schwarz	(Austria) Michael Matt
1930	2024/25	24 November 2024	(France) Clément Noël	(Sweden) Kristoffer Jakobsen	(Norway) Atle Lie McGrath
1967	2025/26	22 November 2025	(France) Paco Rassat	(Belgium) Armand Marchant	(Norway) Atle Lie McGrath
2003	2026/27	22 November 2026	(Norway) Timon Haugan	(Norway) Eirik Hystad Solberg	(Switzerland) Tanguy Nef

=== Women ===
No.	Season	Date	Winner	Second	Third
1814	2024/25	23 November 2024	(United States) Mikaela Shiffrin	(Albania) Lara Colturi	(Switzerland) Camille Rast
1848	2025/26	23 November 2025	(United States) Mikaela Shiffrin (2)	(Albania) Lara Colturi	(Switzerland) Camille Rast
1885	2026/27	21 November 2026	(Albania) Lara Colturi	(Sweden) Sara Hector	(Sweden) Anna Swenn-Larsson
