= Alexis Pinturault =

French alpine skier (born 1991)

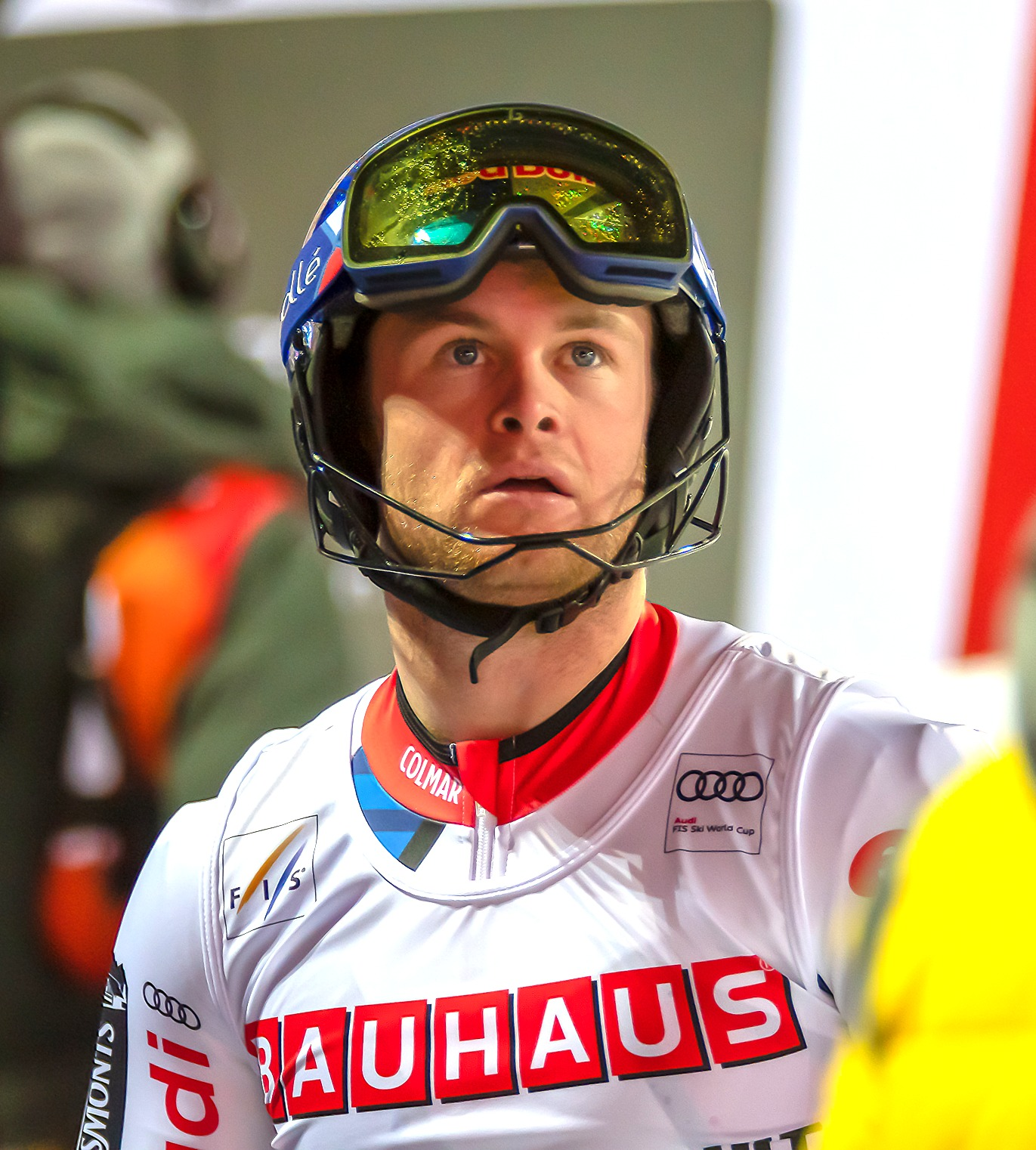
- At Stockholm in February 2019

Personal information
- Born: 20 March 1991 (age 35) Moûtiers, France
- Height: 1.80 m (5 ft 11 in)
- Website: alexispinturault.com

Skiing career
- Country: France
- Sport: Alpine skiing
- Club: Douanes – SC Courchevel
- Retired: 24 March 2026 (age 35)
- Disciplines: Giant slalom, Super-G, Combined (also Slalom before 2023)
- World Cup debut: 13 March 2009 (age 17)

Olympics
- Teams: 3 – (2014, 2018, 2022)
- Medals: 3 (0 gold)

World Championships
- Teams: 7 – (2011–23)
- Medals: 8 (3 gold)

World Cup
- Seasons: 18 – (2009–2026)
- Wins: 34 – (1 SG, 18 GS, 3 SL, 10 AC, 2 PS)
- Podiums: 77 – (4 SG, 41 GS, 12 SL,15 AC, 3 PS, 2 PGS)
- Overall titles: 1 – (2021)
- Discipline titles: 5 – (GS: 2021; AC: 2016, 2017, 2019 & 2020)
Medal record
Men's alpine skiing
Representing France
World Cup race podiums
Event	1st	2nd	3rd
Slalom	3	4	5
Giant	18	12	11
Super-G	1	1	2
Downhill	0	0	0
Combined	10	4	1
Parallel	2	1	2
Total	34	22	21
International alpine ski competitions
Event	1st	2nd	3rd
Olympic Games	0	1	2
World Championships	3	1	4
Total	3	2	6
Olympic Games
Silver medal – second place	2018 Pyeongchang	Combined
Bronze medal – third place	2014 Sochi	Giant slalom
Bronze medal – third place	2018 Pyeongchang	Giant slalom
World Championships
Gold medal – first place	2017 St. Moritz	Team event
Gold medal – first place	2019 Åre	Combined
Gold medal – first place	2023 Courchevel	Combined
Silver medal – second place	2021 Cortina d'Ampezzo	Combined
Bronze medal – third place	2015 Beaver Creek	Giant slalom
Bronze medal – third place	2019 Åre	Giant slalom
Bronze medal – third place	2021 Cortina d'Ampezzo	Super-G
Bronze medal – third place	2023 Courchevel	Super-G
Junior World Championships
Gold medal – first place	2009 Garmisch-Pertenkirchen	Giant slalom
Gold medal – first place	2011 Crans-Montana	Giant slalom

Alexis Pinturault (Alexis Pinturault) (born 20 March 1991 in Moûtiers) is a French former World Cup alpine ski racer and Olympic medalist.

With 34 World Cup victories, Pinturault is the most successful French skier in World Cup history. He represented France at seven World Championships and three Winter Olympics, with four bronze medals in the giant slalom. He was the overall World Cup champion in 2021.

Pinturault is double combined world champion in 2019 and 2023, the world champion in the team event in 2017, and a two-time world junior champion in giant slalom in 2009 and 2011.

== Early years ==
Born in Moûtiers, Savoie, Pinturault grew up in Annecy. His mother, Hege Wiig Pinturault, is from Bergen, Norway, and he spent many of his childhood summers in Norway at Hestnesøy, near Grimstad. He has dual citizenship.

== Ski racing career ==
A week before his 18th birthday, Pinturault made his World Cup debut in March 2009 in Åre, Sweden. His first podium came two years later in March 2011, a runner-up finish in giant slalom in Kranjska Gora, Slovenia. That fall, he was also a runner-up at Sölden in October 2011 and gained his first World Cup victory in February 2012, in the parallel slalom in Moscow, Russia.

Pinturault was unable to make the season start in Sölden in October 2012, as he injured his ankle while playing tennis and had to pause for three months. In December, he won his second World Cup race in slalom at Val-d'Isère, where he thrilled the home fans with a brilliant second run under the floodlights to rise from sixth place. He convincingly beat Germany's Felix Neureuther by half a second and future World Cup champion Marcel Hirscher, who led by 0.57 seconds after the first run. Pinturault's third win was at the super-combined in Wengen, Switzerland, where his superior slalom skills were key. After placing 22nd in the downhill portion, he finished 1.15 seconds ahead of Ivica Kostelić of Croatia. The training run for the downhill portion was his first time on downhill skis for months, as he missed pre-season speed training after surgery on his left ankle in August to repair ligaments damaged while playing tennis. Pinturault did not medal at the world championships in 2013 but had four top-six finishes. A week later, he claimed a fourth World Cup win, his first in giant slalom, at Garmisch, Germany. Being second after the first run, Pinturault's total time was 0.60 seconds ahead of runner-up Hirscher. On 15 March, he was honored as the 2013 Longines Rising Star, as the top young racer (under 23) of the season.

Pinturault changed equipment after the 2014 season, from Salomon to Head.

Before the 2023–24 season, Pinturault announced he will not compete in slalom anymore, giving focus to the speed disciplines.

Pinturault retired at the end of the 2025–26 season.

== World Cup results ==
=== Season titles ===
- 6 titles – (1 overall, 1 Giant slalom, 4 Combined)

Season	
Season	Discipline
2013	Combined ^{[1]}
2014	Combined ^{[2]}
2016	Combined
2017	Combined
2019	Combined
2020	Combined
2021
2021	Overall
2021	Giant slalom
2021	Parallel ^{[3]}

^{1} Unofficial, tied with Ivica Kostelić
^{2} Unofficial, tied with Ted Ligety
^{3} Unofficial

=== Season standings ===
Season
Season	Age	Overall	Slalom	Giant; Slalom	Super G	Downhill	Combined	Parallel
2011	19	54	—	22	30	—	30	—N/a
2012	20	10	18	4	22	54	4	—N/a
2013	21	6	9	3	33	—	1	—N/a
2014	22	3	9	3	13	—	1	—N/a
2015	23	3	10	2	10	—	2	—N/a
2016	24	3	11	2	27	—	1	—N/a
2017	25	4	12	3	22	—	1	—N/a
2018	26	6	14	3	19	—	4	—N/a
2019	27	2	6	3	21	—	1	—N/a
2020	28	2	6	2	8	—	1	19
2021	29	1	7	1	17	—	—N/a	1
2022	30	10	16	5	15	—	—N/a	—
2023	31	8	17	5	5	—	—N/a	—N/a
2024	32	42	—	20	32	39	—N/a	—N/a
2025	33	77	—	26	40	—	—N/a	—N/a
2026	34	52	—	16	—	—	—N/a	—N/a

=== Race victories ===
	Total	Slalom	Giant slalom	Super-G	Combined	Parallel slalom	Parallel giant slalom
Wins	34	3	18	1	10	1	1
Podiums	77	12	41	4	15	3	2

Season
Season	Date	Location	Discipline
2012	21 February 2012	Moscow, Russia	Parallel slalom
2013	8 December 2012	Val-d'Isère, France	Slalom
2013	18 January 2013	Wengen, Switzerland	Combined
2013	24 February 2013	Garmisch-Partenkirchen, Germany	Giant slalom
2014	19 January 2014	Wengen, Switzerland	Slalom
2014	26 January 2014	Kitzbühel, Austria	Combined
2014	13 March 2014	Lenzerheide, Switzerland	Super-G
2015	23 January 2015	Kitzbühel, Austria	Combined
2015	14 March 2015	Kranjska Gora, Slovenia	Giant slalom
2016	22 January 2016	Kitzbühel, Austria	Combined
2016	13 February 2016	Naeba, Japan	Giant slalom
2016	19 February 2016	Chamonix, France	Combined
2016	26 February 2016	Hinterstoder, Austria	Giant slalom
2016	28 February 2016	Hinterstoder, Austria	Giant slalom
2016	4 March 2016	Kranjska Gora, Slovenia	Giant slalom
2017	23 October 2016	Sölden, Austria	Giant slalom
2017	10 December 2016	Val-d'Isère, France	Giant slalom
2017	29 December 2016	Santa Caterina, Italy	Combined
2017	7 January 2017	Adelboden, Switzerland	Giant slalom
2018	9 December 2017	Val-d'Isère, France	Giant slalom
2018	29 December 2017	Bormio, Italy	Combined
2019	22 February 2019	Bansko, Bulgaria	Combined
2019	16 March 2019	Soldeu, Andorra	Giant slalom
2020	27 October 2019	Sölden, Austria	Giant slalom
2020	15 December 2019	Val-d'Isère, France	Slalom
2020	29 December 2019	Bormio, Italy	Combined
2020	2 February 2020	Garmisch-Partenkirchen, Germany	Giant slalom
2020	1 March 2020	Hinterstoder, Austria	Combined
2020	2 March 2020	Hinterstoder, Austria	Giant slalom
2021	27 November 2020	Lech/Zürs, Austria	Parallel-G
2021	20 December 2020	Alta Badia, Italy	Giant slalom
2021	8 January 2021	Adelboden, Switzerland	Giant slalom
2021	9 January 2021	Adelboden, Switzerland	Giant slalom
2021	20 March 2021	Lenzerheide, Switzerland	Giant slalom

=== Podiums ===
Season	Podiums															
Season	Super-G			Giant slalom			Slalom			Parallel^{[1]}			Combined			Σ
Season	1st place, gold medalist(s)	2nd place, silver medalist(s)	3rd place, bronze medalist(s)	1st place, gold medalist(s)	2nd place, silver medalist(s)	3rd place, bronze medalist(s)	1st place, gold medalist(s)	2nd place, silver medalist(s)	3rd place, bronze medalist(s)	1st place, gold medalist(s)	2nd place, silver medalist(s)	3rd place, bronze medalist(s)	1st place, gold medalist(s)	2nd place, silver medalist(s)	3rd place, bronze medalist(s)	Σ
2011					1											1
2012		1			2				1	1				1		6
2013				1		2	1					1	1	1		7
2014	1				3	1	1						1	1		8
2015			1	1	2	1							1			6
2016				4	2								2			8
2017				3		1					1		1			6
2018				1		2							1			4
2019				1		1		2	1			1	1		1	8
2020				3			1	1					2	1		8
2021				4		1			3	1						9
2022					1	1		1								3
2023			1		1	1										3
Total	1	1	2	18	12	11	3	4	5	2	1	2	10	4	1	77
Total	4			41			12			5			15			77

^{1} Including both parallel slalom and parallel giant slalom. Two parallel events have been classified in the sk-db.com results as classic events (the City Event slalom on 23/02/16 and the parallel GS on 18/12/17). They are shown here as parallel events.

== World Championship results ==
Year
Year	Age	Slalom	Giant; Slalom	Super-G	Downhill	Combined	Team Event
2011	19	17	—	DNF	—	—	—
2013	21	6	5	6	—	6	—
2015	23	DNF2	3	11	—	5	—
2017	25	DNF1	7	6	—	10	1
2019	27	4	3	—	—	1	—
2021	29	7	DNF2	3	—	2	—
2023	31	-	7	3	—	1	

== Olympic results ==
Year
Year	Age	Slalom	Giant; Slalom	Super-G	Downhill	Combined
2014	22	DNF2	3	—	—	DNF2
2018	26	5	3	—	—	2
2022	30	16	5	11	—	DNF2

== See also ==
- List of FIS Alpine Ski World Cup men's race winners
