= 2018 Alpine Skiing World Cup – Men's slalom =

Alpine Ski discipline year standings

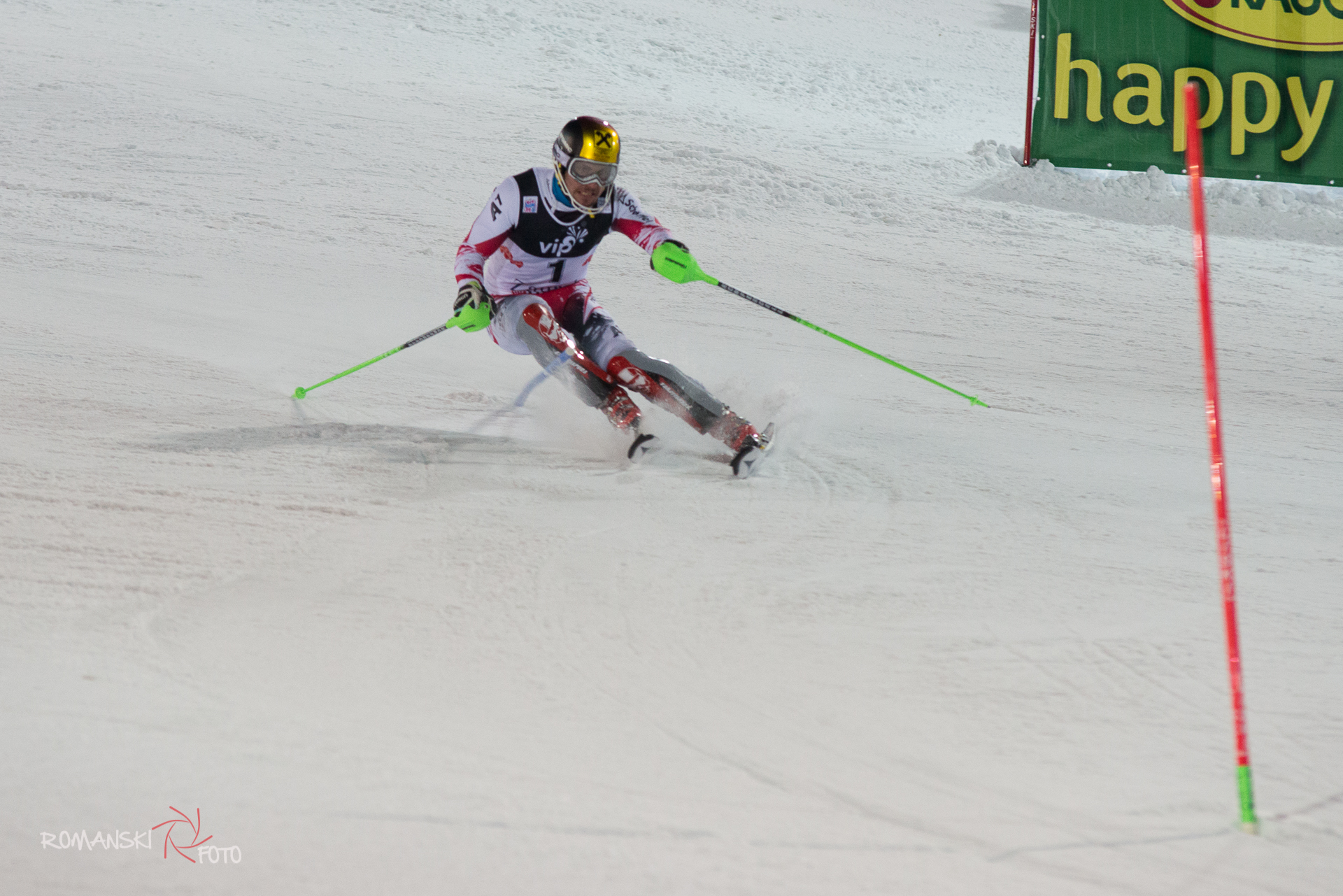
2018 Men's slalom World Cup: Marcel Hirscher of Austria, season champion; 2018 Men's World Cup; Overall • Downhill • Super-G; Giant slalom • Slalom • Combined
Previous: 2017	Next: 2019

The men's slalom in the 2018 FIS Alpine Skiing World Cup involved 11 events, including two parallel slaloms (both city events). The last race, at the World Cup finals in Åre, was cancelled due to high winds.

Marcel Hirscher of Austria won his fifth championship in the discipline, all in the prior six years, on the way to his seventh straight overall men's championship.

The season was interrupted by the 2018 Winter Olympics from 12-24 February 2018 at Yongpyong Alpine Centre (slalom and giant slalom) at the Alpensia Sports Park in PyeongChang and at the Jeongseon Alpine Centre (speed events) in Jeongseon, South Korea. The men's slalom was held on 22 February.

== Standings ==
Parallel slalom (PS) or City Event (CE)

#	Skier	11 Nov 2017; Levi (Finland)	10 Dec 2017; Val d'Isère (France)	22 Dec 2017; Madonna di Campiglio (Italy)	1 Jan 2018; Oslo (CE) (Norway)	4 Jan 2018; Zagreb (Croatia)	7 Jan 2018; Adelboden (Switzerland)	14 Jan 2018; Wengen (Switzerland)	21 Jan 2018; Kitzbühel (Austria)	23 Jan 2018; Schladming (Austria)	30 Jan 2018; Stockholm (CE) (Sweden)	4 Mar 2018; Kranjska Gora (Slovenia)	Total
	(Austria) Marcel Hirscher	14	100	100	40	100	100	100	80	100	40	100	874
2	(Norway) Henrik Kristoffersen	80	80	60	15	60	60	80	100	80	15	80	710
3	(Sweden) André Myhrer	DNF2	60	24	100	29	50	60	DNF2	50	80	7	453
4	(Austria) Michael Matt	18	50	DNF2	80	80	80	40	DNF2	DNF2	40	DNF2	388
5	(Switzerland) Daniel Yule	50	DNF1	50	40	24	22	24	60	60	40	DNF1	370
6	(Switzerland) Ramon Zenhäusern	7	DNQ	13	DNS	20	16	50	40	20	100	60	326
7	(Switzerland) Luca Aerni	50	DNF2	80	40	45	14	DNF1	DNF2	18	50	8	305
8	(Norway) Sebastian Foss-Solevåg	36	29	32	40	32	36	16	DNF2	16	15	45	297
9	(Italy) Stefano Gross	13	40	29	15	DNF2	40	36	24	36	15	26	274
10	(Italy) Manfred Mölgg	29	DNF1	36	15	26	6	22	29	45	DNS	36	244
11	(United Kingdom) Dave Ryding	DNF2	12	40	50	36	22	DNF1	29	22	15	11	237
12	(Sweden) Mattias Hargin	60	32	13	15	15	15	DNF1	15	DNF2	40	9	214
13	(Germany) Linus Straßer	DNF2	DNQ	11	60	4	26	29	DNF1	13	60	10	213
14	(France) Alexis Pinturault	32	DNF2	26	15	40	45	32	DNF1	10	DNS	DNF1	200
15	(France) Victor Muffat-Jeandet	22	7	DNQ	DNS	11	24	14	50	29	DNS	29	186
16	(Austria) Marco Schwarz	20	29	DNF2	DNS	22	18	18	15	24	15	13	174
17	(Austria) Manuel Feller	DNF2	DNF1	45	DNS	50	DNF1	DNF2	45	32	DNS	DNF2	172
18	(France) Clément Noël	DNF1	11	DNF2	DNS	DNQ	DNF1	8	32	40	15	50	156
19	(Norway) Jonathan Nordbotten	DNF2	45	DNQ	DNS	16	11	0	36	26	15	DNF1	149
20	(Norway) Leif Kristian Nestvold-Haugen	16	16	14	DNS	DSQ1	7	45	22	8	15	5	148
21	(France) Jean-Baptiste Grange	24	20	18	DNS	5	13	15	20	15	DNS	DNQ	130
22	(Switzerland) Loïc Meillard	40	18	DNF2	DNS	18	32	DNF1	DNF1	DNF1	DNS	16	124
23	(Germany) Fritz Dopfer	16	36	DNQ	15	DNF2	9	DNQ	13	11	DNS	15	115
24	(France) Julien Lizeroux	10	22	20	DNS	14	DNF1	20	18	0	DNS	DNQ	104
25	(Germany) Felix Neureuther	100	DNS										100
26	(Austria) Christian Hirschbühl	11	24	22	DNS	13	29	DNF1	DNF2	DNF2	DNS	DNF1	99
27	(Austria) Marc Digruber	DNF2	10	DNQ	DNS	12	DNF2	26	12	10	DNS	22	92
28	(Switzerland) Marc Rochat	12	DNF1	DNF1	DNS	DNQ	DNF1	DNF1	DNF2	DNF1	DNS	40	52
29	(Germany) Sebastian Holzmann	DNQ	DNF1	8	DNS	DNQ	DNQ	13	DNQ	DNQ	DNS	24	45
	(Russia) Alexander Khoroshilov	DNQ	9	DNF2	15	9	12	DNF1	DNF1	DNF2	DNS	DNF2	45
	References												

== See also ==
- 2018 Alpine Skiing World Cup – Men's summary rankings
- 2018 Alpine Skiing World Cup – Men's overall
- 2018 Alpine Skiing World Cup – Men's downhill
- 2018 Alpine Skiing World Cup – Men's super-G
- 2018 Alpine Skiing World Cup – Men's giant slalom
- 2018 Alpine Skiing World Cup – Men's combined
