= 2021 Alpine Skiing World Cup – Men's parallel =

Alpine ski discipline year standings

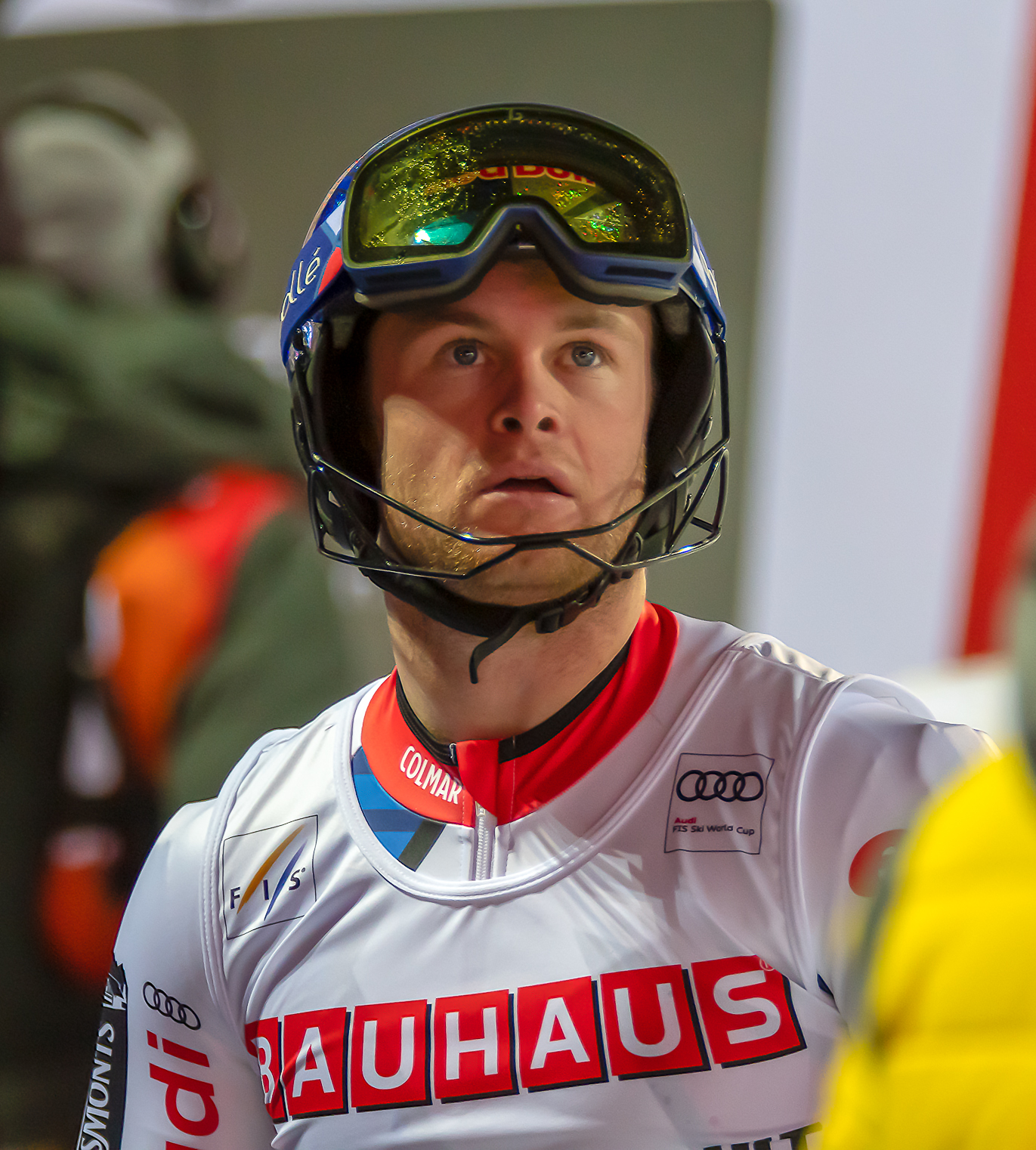
2021 men's parallel World Cup: Alexis Pinturault of France, season champion; 2021 men's World Cup; overall • downhill • super-g; giant slalom • slalom • Parallel
Previous: 2020	Next: 2022

The men's parallel competition in the 2021 FIS Alpine Skiing World Cup involved only 1 event, a parallel giant slalom, due to the COVID-19 pandemic. Three additional parallel events, scheduled for Alta Badia, Davos, and Chamonix, were cancelled prior to the start of the season.

The sole event was won by Alexis Pinturault, who thus won the season championship. This specific discipline includes both parallel giant slalom and parallel slalom races. At this time, individual parallel races were not included in the season finals, which were held in 2021 in Lenzerheide, Switzerland.

The season was interrupted by the 2021 World Ski Championships, which were held from 8–21 February in Cortina d'Ampezzo, Italy. The men's parallel giant slalom was held on 16 February 2021.

== Standings ==
#	Skier	27 Nov 2020; Lech/Zürs (Austria); PG	Total
1	(France) Alexis Pinturault	100	100
2	(Norway) Henrik Kristoffersen	80	80
3	(Germany) Alexander Schmid	60	60
4	(Austria) Adrian Pertl	50	50
5	(Switzerland) Semyel Bissig	45	45
6	(Switzerland) Gino Caviezel	40	40
7	(Germany) Stefan Luitz	36	36
8	(Austria) Christian Hirschbühl	32	32
9	(Austria) Dominik Raschner	29	29
10	(Croatia) Filip Zubčić	26	26
10	(France) Mathieu Faivre	26	26
12	(Canada) Erik Read	22	22
13	(Norway) Timon Haugan	20	20
14	(Norway) Aleksander Aamodt Kilde	18	18
15	(France) Thibaut Favrot	16	16
16	(Norway) Atle Lie McGrath	15	15
17	(Slovenia) Štefan Hadalin	14	14
18	(Norway) Lucas Braathen	13	13
19	(Austria) Fabio Gstrein	12	12
20	(Austria) Roland Leitinger	11	11
21	(Norway) Leif Kristian Nestvold-Haugen	10	10
22	(Germany) Julian Rauchfuß	9	9
23	(Sweden) Mattias Rönngren	8	8
24	(Sweden) Kristoffer Jakobsen	7	7
25	(Slovenia) Žan Kranjec	6	6
	References		

- Winner
- 2nd place
- 3rd place
- DNS = Did not start
- DNQ = Did not qualify
- Updated at 21 March 2021, after all events.

== See also ==
- 2021 Alpine Skiing World Cup – Men's summary rankings
- 2021 Alpine Skiing World Cup – Men's overall
- 2021 Alpine Skiing World Cup – Men's downhill
- 2021 Alpine Skiing World Cup – Men's super-G
- 2021 Alpine Skiing World Cup – Men's giant slalom
- 2021 Alpine Skiing World Cup – Men's slalom
- World Cup scoring system
