= 2018 Alpine Skiing World Cup – Men's giant slalom =

Alpine ski discipline year standings

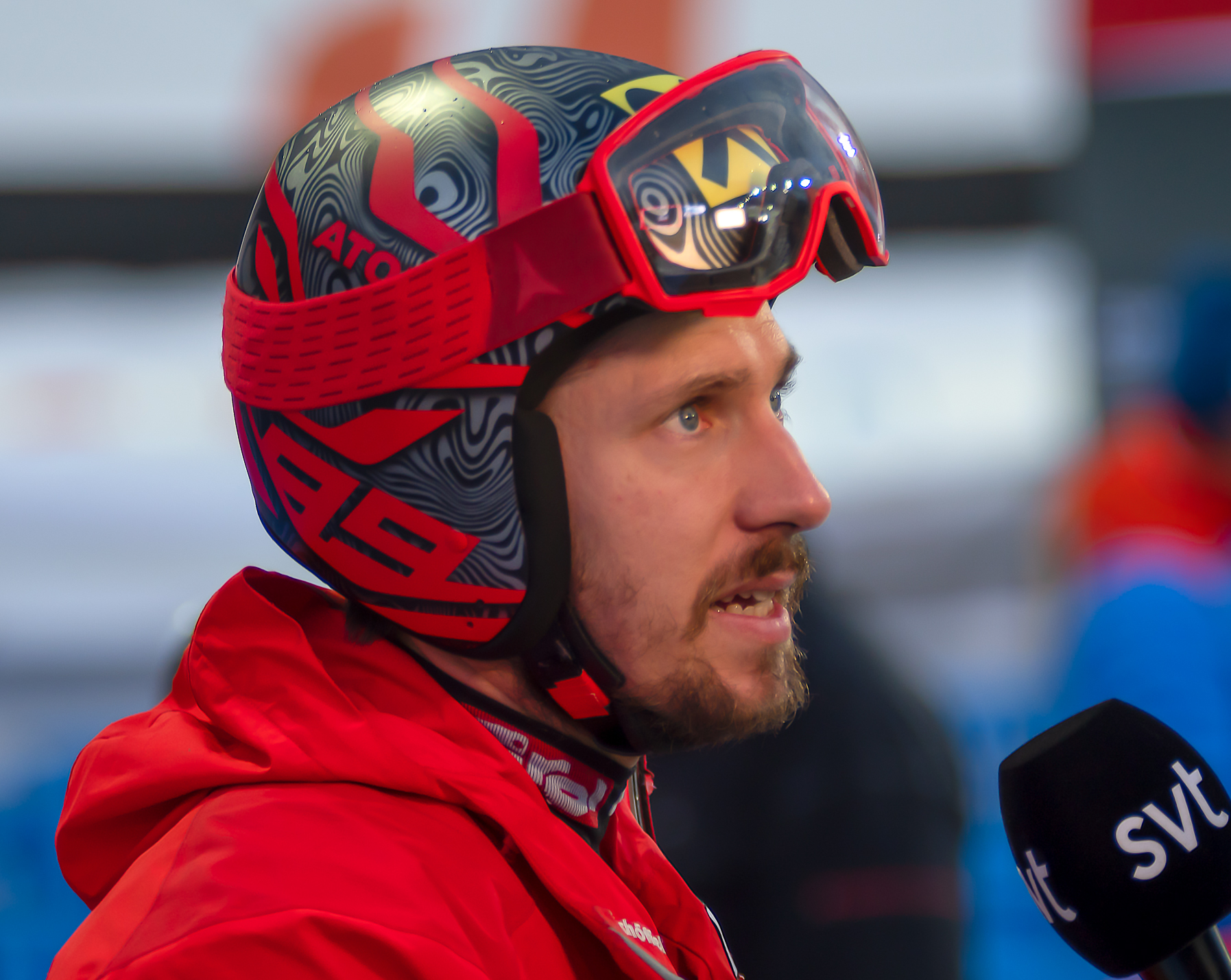
2018 Men's Giant slalom World Cup: Marcel Hirscher of Austria, season champion; 2018 Men's World Cup; Overall • Downhill • Super-G; Giant slalom • Slalom • Combined
Previous: 2017	Next: 2019

The men's giant slalom in the 2018 FIS Alpine Skiing World Cup involved eight events, including a parallel giant slalom. Marcel Hirscher of Austria won six of the races this season and easily won the discipline for the fourth straight season, his fifth total win in this discipline, on his way to his seventh straight overall World Cup championship. Hirscher clinched the victory after winning the next-to-last race of the season in Kranjska Gora, Slovenia.

The season was interrupted by the 2018 Winter Olympics from 12 to 24 February 2018 at Yongpyong Alpine Centre (slalom and giant slalom) at the Alpensia Sports Park in PyeongChang and at the Jeongseon Alpine Centre (speed events) in Jeongseon, South Korea. The men's giant slalom was held on 18 February.

== Standings ==
Parallel giant slalom (PG)

#	Skier	3 Dec 2017; Beaver Creek (United States)	9 Dec 2017; Val d'Isère (France)	17 Dec 2017; Alta Badia (Italy)	18 Dec 2017; Alta Badia (PG) (Italy)	8 Jan 2018; Adelboden (Switzerland)	26 Jan 2018; Garmisch-Partenkirchen (Germany)	3 Mar 2018; Kranjska Gora (Slovenia)	17 Mar 2018; Åre (Sweden)	Tot.
	(Austria) Marcel Hirscher	100	60	100	60	100	100	100	100	720
2	(Norway) Henrik Kristoffersen	80	45	80	80	80	50	80	80	575
3	(France) Alexis Pinturault	22	100	29	29	60	29	60	DNF2	329
4	(Austria) Manuel Feller	50	32	36	DNS	45	80	40	26	309
5	(Sweden) Matts Olsson	29	29	40	100	16	45	DNF1	40	299
6	(Slovenia) Žan Kranjec	18	36	60	10	45	13	45	45	272
7	(Switzerland) Justin Murisier	45	24	50	36	24	20	DNF2	29	228
8	(Norway) Leif Kristian Nestvold-Haugen	9	20	26	45	26	0	50	22	198
9	(Switzerland) Loïc Meillard	40	DNF1	13	24	DNF2	26	22	50	175
10	(France) Victor Muffat-Jeandet	DNF1	18	8	12	11	22	36	60	167
11	(United States) Ted Ligety	36	15	45	8	DNF2	60	DNF1	0	164
12	(France) Mathieu Faivre	DNQ	50	24	7	32	32	DNF1	DNF2	145
13	(Germany) Stefan Luitz	60	80	DNF1	DNS					140
14	(Italy) Florian Eisath	10	22	15	11	14	36	DNF1	26	134
15	(Italy) Manfred Mölgg	20	7	12	1	36	24	12	20	132
16	(Italy) Luca De Aliprandini	16	12	32	18	50	DNQ	DNF2	0	128
17	(United States) Tommy Ford	26	9	DNF2	5	DNF2	4	29	32	105
18	(France) Thomas Fanara	3	26	18	4	DNF2	15	DNF1	36	102
19	(Norway) Aleksander Aamodt Kilde	5	DNS	DNQ	50	DNS	40	DNF1	DNS	95
20	(Germany) Alexander Schmid	DNF1	40	5	9	DNF2	9	11	18	92
21	(Croatia) Filip Zubčić	32	2	6	32	DNF1	12	5	0	89
22	(Italy) Riccardo Tonetti	12	3	0	2	32	6	9	0	64
23	(Sweden) Andre Myhrer	13	DNF1	9	40	DNF1	DNF1	DNF1	DNS	62
	(Italy) Roberto Nani	6	8	15	26	DNF1	7	DNQ	0	62
25	(Austria) Stefan Brennsteiner	DNQ	DNF1	20	15	22	DNF1	DNS		57
	(Switzerland) Gino Caviezel	7	6	11	3	20	DNF1	DNF1	DNF1	57
	References									

- Winner
- 2nd place
- 3rd place
- DNS = Did not start
- DNF1 = Did not finish run 1
- DSQ1 = Disqualified run 1
- DNQ = Did not qualify for run 2
- DNF2 = Did not finish run 2
- DSQ2 = Disqualified run 2

Updated at 18 March 2018 after all events.

== See also ==
- 2018 Alpine Skiing World Cup – Men's summary rankings
- 2018 Alpine Skiing World Cup – Men's overall
- 2018 Alpine Skiing World Cup – Men's downhill
- 2018 Alpine Skiing World Cup – Men's super-G
- 2018 Alpine Skiing World Cup – Men's slalom
- 2018 Alpine Skiing World Cup – Men's combined
