= 2018 Alpine Skiing World Cup – Men's super-G =

Alpine ski discipline year standings

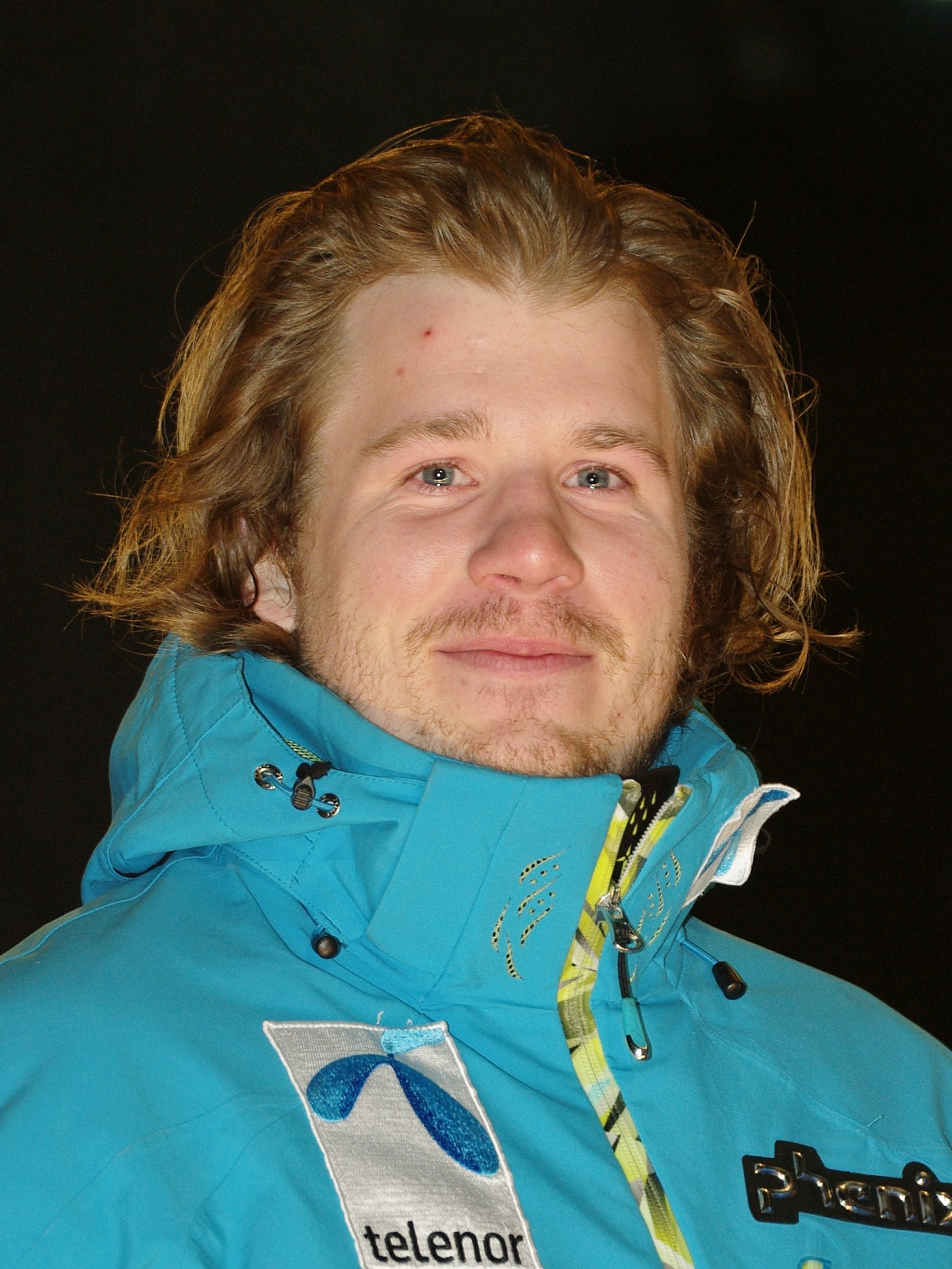
2018 Men's Super-G World Cup: Kjetil Jansrud of Norway, season champion; 2018 Men's World Cup; Overall • Downhill • Super-G; Giant slalom • Slalom • Combined
Previous: 2017	Next: 2019

The men's super-G in the 2018 FIS Alpine Skiing World Cup involved six events including the final in Åre, Sweden. Norwegian skier Kjetil Jansrud, the defending champion in the discipline, won two of the first five races and finished second in two more, clinching the crystal globe for the season before the final.

The season was interrupted by the 2018 Winter Olympics from 12-24 February 2018 at Yongpyong Alpine Centre (slalom and giant slalom) at the Alpensia Sports Park in PyeongChang and at the Jeongseon Alpine Centre (speed events) in Jeongseon, South Korea. The men's super-G was held on 16 February, one day later than originally scheduled due to other postponements.

== Standings ==
Rank	Name	26 Nov 2017; Lake Louise (Canada)	1 Dec 2017; Beaver Creek (United States)	15 Dec 2017; Val Gardena/Gröden (Italy)	19 Jan 2018; Kitzbühel (Austria)	11 Mar 2018; Kvitfjell (Norway)	15 Mar 2018; Åre (Sweden)	Total
	(Norway) Kjetil Jansrud	100	80	0	80	100	40	400
2	(Austria) Vincent Kriechmayr	29	100	45	26	20	100	320
3	(Norway) Aksel Lund Svindal	45	40	29	100	DNF	60	274
4	(Austria) Hannes Reichelt	60	60	16	50	36	45	267
5	(Austria) Max Franz	80	12	80	DNS	32	22	226
6	(Germany) Josef Ferstl	26	18	100	13	6	32	195
7	(Italy) Christof Innerhofer	40	20	7	24	18	80	189
8	(Austria) Matthias Mayer	DNF	40	60	60	DNF	20	180
9	(Switzerland) Beat Feuz	22	6	26	40	80	0	174
10	(Austria) Adrien Théaux	16	50	36	45	22	0	169
11	(Germany) Thomas Dreßen	18	26	11	16	32	60	163
	(Norway) Aleksander Aamodt Kilde	50	32	50	22	9	0	163
13	(Germany) Andreas Sander	7	29	40	32	26	0	134
14	(Italy) Peter Fill	32	15	32	36	DNS		115
15	(Switzerland) Mauro Caviezel	3	DNF	12	DNF	40	36	91
16	(Italy) Dominik Paris	36	26	10	15	0	0	87
17	(Canada) Dustin Cook	24	11	18	10	7	16	86
18	(Austria) Christian Walder	14	DNF	8	18	13	29	82
19	(France) Alexis Pinturault	DNS	45	4	9	DNS	20	78
20	(Norway) Adrian Smiseth Sejersted	5	13	DNF	DNS	50	0	68
21	(France) Brice Roger	0	4	DNS	0	60	0	64
22	(Switzerland) Gilles Roulin	6	14	6	20	14	0	60
23	(Switzerland) Thomas Tumler	20	22	0	15	0	0	57
24	(Canada) Manuel Osborne-Paradis	0	1	DNF	6	45	DSQ	52
25	(France) Blaise Giezendanner	DNS		9	29	9	0	47
	References							

- Winner
- 2nd place
- 3rd place
- DNF = Did Not Finish
- DSQ = Disqualified
- DNS = Did Not Start
- Updated at 18 March 2018, after all events.

== See also ==
- 2018 Alpine Skiing World Cup – Men's summary rankings
- 2018 Alpine Skiing World Cup – Men's overall
- 2018 Alpine Skiing World Cup – Men's downhill
- 2018 Alpine Skiing World Cup – Men's giant slalom
- 2018 Alpine Skiing World Cup – Men's slalom
- 2018 Alpine Skiing World Cup – Men's combined
- World Cup scoring system
