= Alpensia Resort =

Ski resort in South Korea

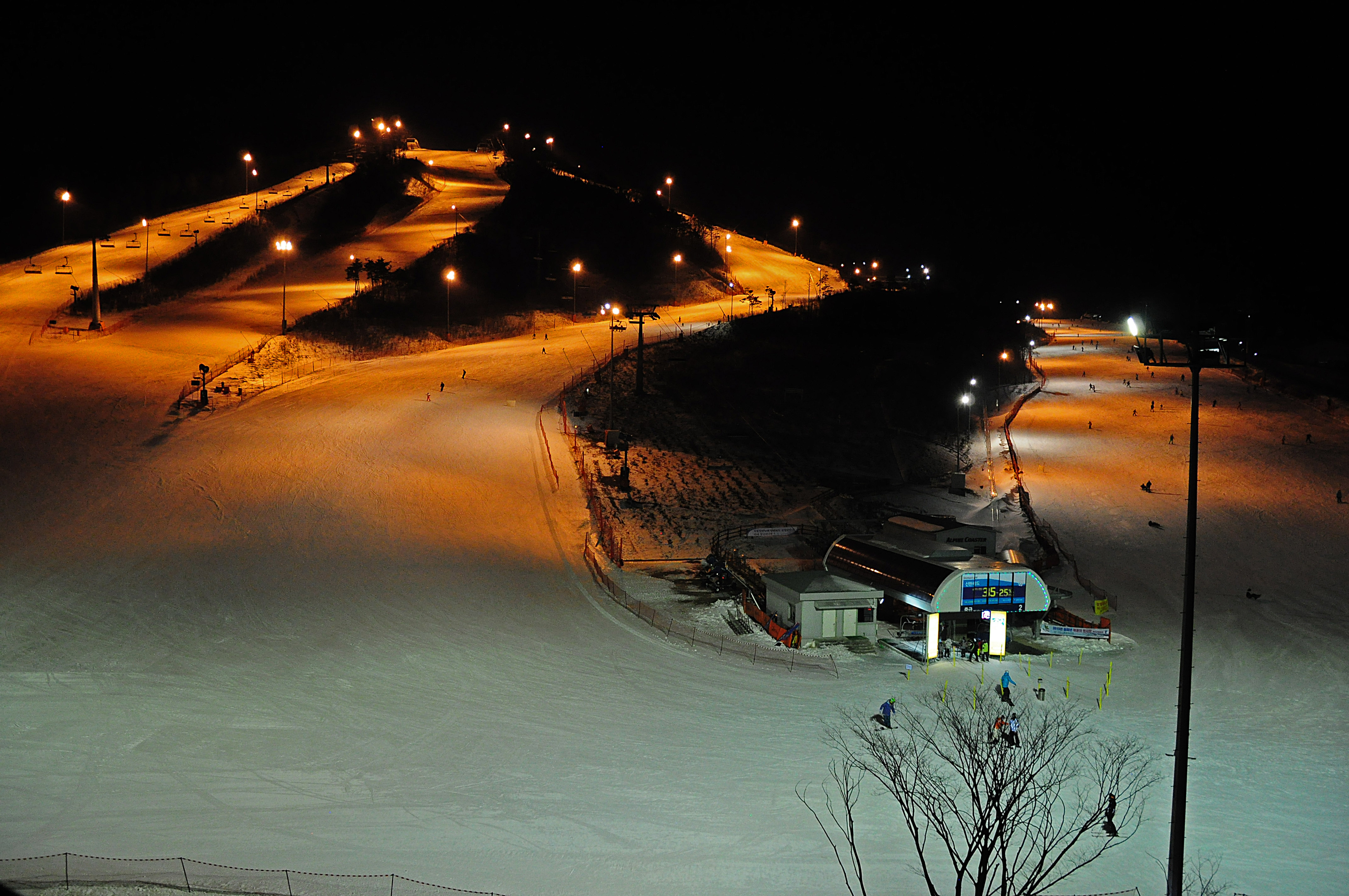
- Night Skiing at Alpensia

- Location in South Korea
- Location: Pyeongchang, South Korea
- Nearest major city: Daegwallyeong-myeon
- Coordinates: 37.661°N 128.680°E
- Website: alpensiaresort.co.kr

The Alpensia Resort (Korean: 알펜시아 리조트) is a ski resort and a tourist attraction. It is located on the territory of the township of Daegwallyeong-myeon, in the county of Pyeongchang.

== Overview ==
The ski resort is approximately 2.5 hours from Seoul or Incheon Airport by car, predominantly motorway. From Seoul Cheongrangri KTX station (North-East Seoul) as well as Seoul KTX station 1 and, half-hour away, KTX Jinbu station exclusively-built for PyeongChang 2018 and opened in February 2017. There are purple ski shuttle buses to the resort 3 or 4 times a day.

Alpensia has six slopes for skiing and snowboarding, with pistes (or "runs") up to 1.4 km (0.87 mi) long, for beginners and advanced skiers; and an area reserved for snowboarders. While the resort is open year-round, the off-season turns the bottom of the slopes into a wild flower garden of about 100,000 square meters.

When the ski and snowboarding season opens, all runs are serviced by chairlifts and are named: Alpha (beginner), Bravo (beginner/intermediate), Charlie, Delta, Echo and Foxtrot catering for intermediate ability. All slopes are closed between 4:30 pm and 6:30 pm each day for piste-maintenance. Night skiing is available from 6:30 pm to 10 pm.

Alpensia is a 5–10-minute car ride to the more extensive Yongpyong Ski Resort which has a full range of runs.

In the resort village are three main accommodation providers: Intercontinental Hotel, Holiday Inn Hotel, and Holiday Inn Suites.

The Alpensia Ski Jumping Stadium is within the station; it was the location of the ski jumping events of the 2018 Winter Olympics.

Alpensia was the focus of the 2018 Cultural Olympiad, with a new, purpose-built concert hall within the resort as well as an indoor water park.

== History ==
The decision to build Alpensia resort was taken in 2003, in the frame of the ambition of the Gangwon Province to host the Winter Olympics. The resort was built on vacated farmlands and potato fields. The facility was completed in 2011.

In 2013, Alpensia Resort was one of the venues of the 2013 Special Olympics World Winter Games.

In 2021, the resort's convention center, Alpensia Convention Center, was used as a filming location for the South Korean TV series Loud, where remaining contestants went there for the second round.

== 2018 Winter Olympics ==
The Alpensia Resort was the focus of many of the outdoor sports of the 2018 Pyeongchang Winter Olympics.

The venues are the following:

- Alpensia Ski Jumping Stadium – Ski jumping, Nordic combined
- Alpensia Biathlon Centre – Biathlon
- Alpensia Nordic Centre – Cross-country skiing, Nordic combined
- Alpensia Sliding Centre – Luge, bobsleigh and skeleton

In addition, Alpensia is the location of an Olympic Village and the nearby Yongpyong Ski Resort was the venue for alpine skiing technical events (slalom and giant slalom). The speed events of downhill, super-G, and combined were held at Jeongseon Alpine Centre (which was supposed to be demolished to restaure the forest, although that which was destroyed was of old age that could not be brought back).

After the Olympics, Alpensia Resort also hosted the 2018 Winter Paralympics.

== Financial problems ==
In 2012, it was announced that Alpensia Resort was threatened by bankruptcy, having accumulated losses of $55 million annually. Although this has been denied by Kim Jin-sun from the POCOG in January 2013, the financial problems had not improved as of September 2013. Some Gangwon Congress members insisted on selling Alpensia before it was too late. Others argued either to request financial support from the government or to withdraw from the acceptance of the 2018 Pyeongchang Winter Olympics.
