= 2018 Alpine Skiing World Cup – Men's overall =

Alpine ski discipline year standings

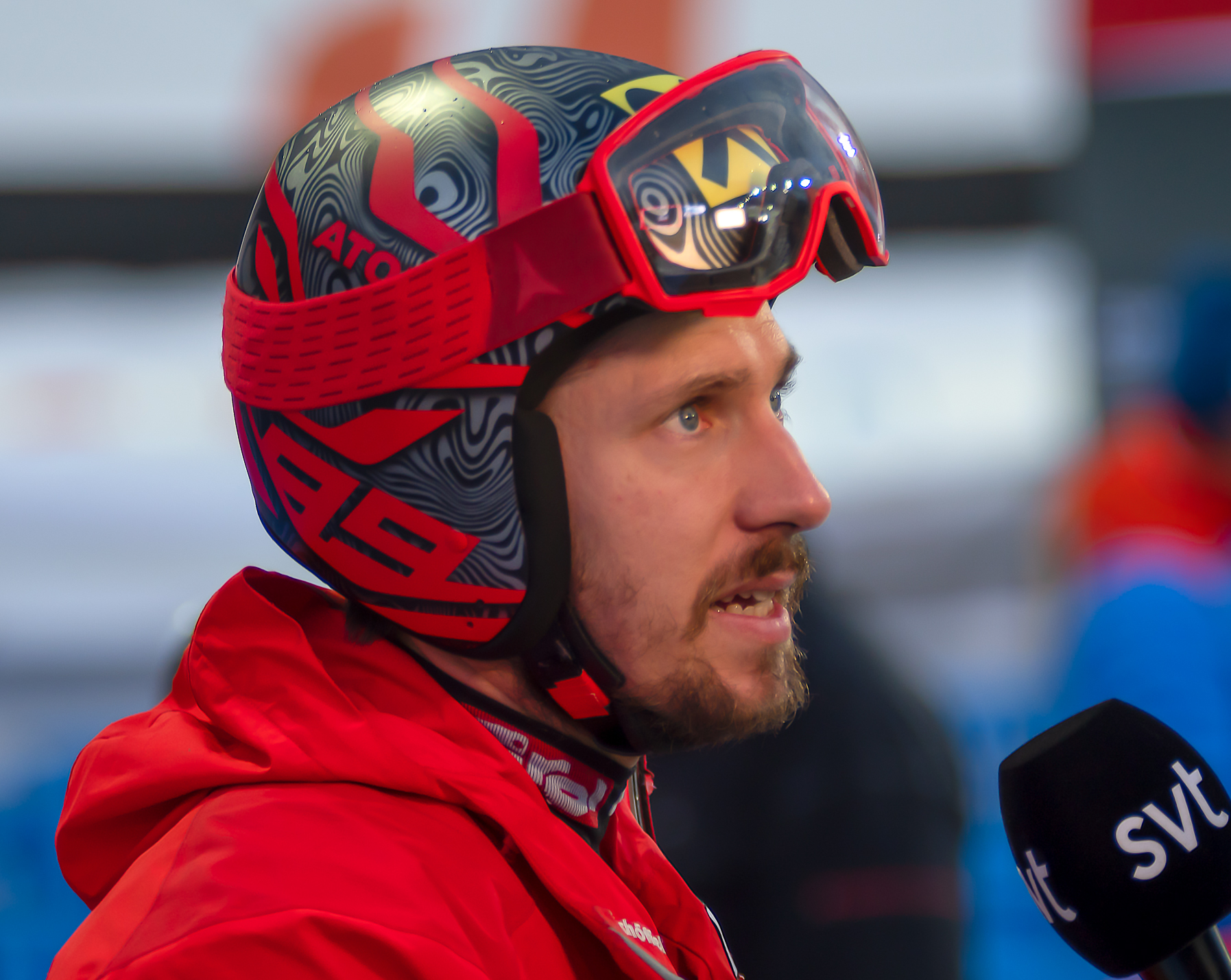
2018 men's overall World Cup: Marcel Hirscher of Austria, season champion; 2018 men's World Cup; Overall • downhill • super-g; giant slalom • slalom • combined
Previous: 2017	Next: 2019

The men's overall in the 2018 FIS Alpine Skiing World Cup involved 36 events in 5 disciplines: downhill (DH) (9 races), Super-G (SG) (6 races), giant slalom (GS) (8 races), slalom (SL) (11 races), and Alpine combined (AC) (2 races). Marcel Hirscher of Austria won the overall title for the seventh consecutive time. Although Hirscher had broken his ankle in August, prior to the start of the season, he clinched the title a full two weeks before the season finals in Åre, Sweden. In so doing, Hirscher extended his own record of six consecutive overall World Cup titles, which he had set the season before, and set the all-time record with seven overall, as the prior record was six, set by Annemarie Moser-Pröll in 1978-79.

Hirscher also tied the record for men of 13 wins in a World Cup season, equalling the mark set by Ingemar Stenmark (1978-79) and Hermann Maier (2000-01).

The season was interrupted by the 2018 Winter Olympics from 12–24 February 2018 at Yongpyong Alpine Centre (slalom and giant slalom) at the Alpensia Sports Park in PyeongChang and at the Jeongseon Alpine Centre (speed events) in Jeongseon, South Korea.

== Standings ==
#	Skier	DH; 9 races	SG; 6 races	GS; 8 races	SL; 11 races	AC; 2 races	Total
	(Austria) Marcel Hirscher	0	26	720	874	0	1,620
2	(Norway) Henrik Kristoffersen	0	0	575	710	0	1,285
3	(Norway) Aksel Lund Svindal	612	274	0	0	0	886
4	(Norway) Kjetil Jansrud	343	400	16	15	110	884
5	(Switzerland) Beat Feuz	682	174	0	0	0	856
6	(France) Alexis Pinturault	0	78	329	200	100	707
7	(Austria) Vincent Kriechmayr	384	320	0	0	0	704
8	(Germany) Thomas Dreßen	446	163	0	0	63	672
9	(Austria) Matthias Mayer	348	180	22	0	72	622
10	(Austria) Hannes Reichelt	268	267	0	0	0	535
11	(Sweden) Andre Myhrer	0	0	62	460	0	522
12	(Italy) Dominik Paris	386	87	0	0	45	518
13	(Austria) Manuel Feller	0	0	309	172	0	481
14	(France) Victor Muffat-Jeandet	0	0	167	186	105	458
15	(Norway) Aleksander Aamodt Kilde	157	163	95	0	39	454
16	(Italy) Peter Fill	191	115	0	0	140	446
17	(Austria) Max Franz	207	226	0	0	0	433
18	(France) Adrien Théaux	238	169	0	0	0	407
19	(Austria) Michael Matt	0	0	6	388	0	394
20	(Italy) Christof Innerhofer	176	189	0	0	24	389
21	(Italy) Manfred Mölgg	0	0	132	244	0	376
22	(Switzerland) Daniel Yule	0	0	0	370	0	370
23	(Switzerland) Mauro Caviezel	177	91	0	0	90	358
24	(Norway) Leif Kristian Nestvold-Haugen	0	0	198	148	0	346
25	(Switzerland) Luca Aerni	0	0	28	305	0	333

- Leader
- 2nd place
- 3rd place
- Updated at 18 March 2018, after all events

== See also ==
- 2018 Alpine Skiing World Cup – Men's summary rankings
- 2018 Alpine Skiing World Cup – Men's downhill
- 2018 Alpine Skiing World Cup – Men's super-G
- 2018 Alpine Skiing World Cup – Men's giant slalom
- 2018 Alpine Skiing World Cup – Men's slalom
- 2018 Alpine Skiing World Cup – Men's combined
- 2018 Alpine Skiing World Cup – Women's overall
- World Cup scoring system
