= FIS Alpine World Ski Championships 2021 =

Skiing event in Cortina d'Ampezzo, Italy

- Host city: Cortina d'Ampezzo
- Country: Italy
- Events: 13
- Opening: 8 February 2021
- Closing: 21 February 2021
- Opened by: Sergio Mattarella

Location in Europe
Location in the Alps

The FIS Alpine World Ski Championships 2021 were held from 8 to 21 February in Cortina d'Ampezzo, Italy. In May 2020, the Italian Winter Sports Federation (FISI) and the event organizing committee asked the International Ski Federation (FIS) to postpone the event until 2022 due to the COVID-19 pandemic, however, the request was rejected by FIS, and the organizers then moved forward with plans for 2021.

The host city was selected at the FIS Congress in Cancún, Mexico, on 10 June 2016. Cortina d'Ampezzo was the only applicant, and had been a finalist for the previous two championships.

Cortina previously hosted the world championships in 1932 and 1956 (Winter Olympics) and has held numerous World Cup events; the Tofane is a regular stop for women's speed events in January. It is scheduled to host the alpine skiing events of the 2026 Winter Olympics.

This was the seventh edition in Italy; in addition to Cortina, other sites were Bormio (2005, 1985), Sestriere (1997), and Val Gardena (1970). Sestriere was also the alpine host for the 2006 Winter Olympics, with women's speed events at San Sicario.

== Russia doping ban ==
On 9 December 2019, the World Anti-Doping Agency (WADA) banned Russia from all international sport for a period of four years, after the Russian government was found to have tampered with laboratory data that it provided to WADA in January 2019 as a condition of the Russian Anti-Doping Agency being reinstated.

As a result of the ban, WADA plans to allow individually cleared Russian athletes to take part in the 2021–22 World Championships and 2022 Winter Olympics under a neutral banner, as instigated at the 2018 Winter Olympics, but they will not be permitted to compete in team sports. The title of the neutral banner has yet to be determined; WADA Compliance Review Committee head Jonathan Taylor stated that the IOC would not be able to use "Olympic Athletes from Russia" (OAR) as it did in 2018, emphasizing that neutral athletes cannot be portrayed as representing a specific country. Russia later filed an appeal to the Court of Arbitration for Sport (CAS) against the WADA decision.

After reviewing the case on appeal, CAS ruled on 17 December 2020 to reduce the penalty that WADA had placed on Russia. Instead of banning Russia from sporting events, the ruling allowed Russia to participate at the Olympics and other international events, but for a period of two years, the team cannot use the Russian name, flag, or anthem and must present themselves as "Neutral Athlete" or "Neutral Team". The ruling does allow for team uniforms to display "Russia" on the uniform as well as the use of the Russian flag colors within the uniform's design, although the name should be up to equal predominance as the "Neutral Athlete/Team" designation.

== Schedule and course information ==
Thirteen events were scheduled and completed.

All times are local (UTC+1).

Events calendar
Events			Event days									
Events			11	13	14	15	16	17	18	19	20	21
Events			February									
Men	Downhill				11:00							
Men	Super-G		13:00 (Note: The event was scheduled for 9 February, but was postponed.)									
Men	Alpine combined	Super-G				11:15 (Note: The event was scheduled for 10 February, but was postponed.)						
Men	Alpine combined	Slalom				15:20						
Men	Parallel giant slalom						14:00					
Men	Giant slalom	Run 1								10:00		
Men	Giant slalom	Run 2								13:30		
Men	Slalom	Run 1										10:00
Men	Slalom	Run 2										13:30
Women	Downhill			11:00								
Women	Super-G		10:45 (Note: The event was scheduled for 9 February, but was postponed due to fog.)									
Women	Alpine combined	Super-G				09:45 (Note: The event was scheduled for 8 February, but was postponed due to heavy snow.)						
Women	Alpine combined	Slalom				14:10						
Women	Parallel giant slalom						14:00					
Women	Giant slalom	Run 1							10:00			
Women	Giant slalom	Run 2							13:30			
Women	Slalom	Run 1									10:00	
Women	Slalom	Run 2									13:30	
Mixed	Team parallel event							12:15				

=== Course information ===
Date	Race	Start elevation	Finish elevation	Vertical drop	Course length	Average gradient
Sun 14 Feb	Downhill – men	2,400 m (7,874 ft)	1,560 m (5,118 ft)	840 m (2,756 ft)	2.610 km (1.622 mi)	32.2%
Sat 13 Feb	Downhill – women	2,320 m (7,612 ft)	1,560 m (5,118 ft)	760 m (2,493 ft)	2.660 km (1.653 mi)	28.6%
Thu 11 Feb	Super-G – men	2,190 m (7,185 ft)	1,560 m (5,118 ft)	630 m (2,067 ft)	2.075 km (1.289 mi)	30.4%
Thu 11 Feb	Super-G – women	2,160 m (7,087 ft)	1,560 m (5,118 ft)	600 m (1,969 ft)	2.150 km (1.336 mi)	27.9%
Mon 15 Feb	Super-G – (AC) – men	2,160 m (7,087 ft)	1,560 m (5,118 ft)	600 m (1,969 ft)	2.150 km (1.336 mi)	27.9%
Mon 15 Feb	Super-G – (AC) – women	2,160 m (7,087 ft)	1,560 m (5,118 ft)	600 m (1,969 ft)	2.150 km (1.336 mi)	27.9%
Fri 19 Feb	Giant slalom – men	2,010 m (6,594 ft)	1,560 m (5,118 ft)	450 m (1,476 ft)		
Thu 18 Feb	Giant slalom – women	1,960 m (6,430 ft)	1,560 m (5,118 ft)	400 m (1,312 ft)		
Sun 21 Feb	Slalom – men	1,700 m (5,577 ft)	1,490 m (4,888 ft)	210 m (689 ft)		
Sat 20 Feb	Slalom – women	1,700 m (5,577 ft)	1,490 m (4,888 ft)	210 m (689 ft)		
Mon 15 Feb	Slalom – (AC) – men	1,740 m (5,709 ft)	1,560 m (5,118 ft)	180 m (591 ft)		
Mon 15 Feb	Slalom – (AC) – women	1,740 m (5,709 ft)	1,560 m (5,118 ft)	180 m (591 ft)		
Tue 16 Feb	Parallel GS – men	2,055 m (6,742 ft)	1,890 m (6,201 ft)	165 m (541 ft)		
Tue 16 Feb	Parallel GS – women	2,055 m (6,742 ft)	1,890 m (6,201 ft)	165 m (541 ft)		
Wed 17 Feb	Team event – mixed	1,665 m (5,463 ft)	1,555 m (5,102 ft)	110 m (361 ft)		

== Medal summary ==
=== Medal table ===
* Host nation (Italy)

Rank	Nation	Gold	Silver	Bronze	Total
1	Austria	5	1	2	8
2	Switzerland	3	1	5	9
3	France	2	1	2	5
4	Norway	2	0	1	3
5	United States	1	1	2	4
6	Italy*	1	1	0	2
7	Germany	0	3	1	4
8	Slovakia	0	2	0	2
9	Croatia	0	1	0	1
9	Sweden	0	1	0	1
Totals (10 entries)		14	12	13	39

=== Men's events ===
Event	Gold		Silver		Bronze	
Downhill	Vincent Kriechmayr; Austria	1:37.79	Andreas Sander; Germany	1:37.80	Beat Feuz; Switzerland	1:37.97
Super-G	Vincent Kriechmayr; Austria	1:19.41	Romed Baumann; Germany	1:19.48	Alexis Pinturault; France	1:19.79
Giant slalom	Mathieu Faivre; France	2:37.25	Luca De Aliprandini; Italy	2:37.88	Marco Schwarz; Austria	2:38.12
Slalom	Sebastian Foss-Solevåg; Norway	1:46.48	Adrian Pertl; Austria	1:46.69	Henrik Kristoffersen; Norway	1:46.94
Alpine combined	Marco Schwarz; Austria	2:05.86	Alexis Pinturault; France	2:05.90	Loïc Meillard; Switzerland	2:06.98
Parallel giant slalom	Mathieu Faivre; France		Filip Zubčić; Croatia		Loïc Meillard; Switzerland	

=== Women's events ===
Event	Gold		Silver		Bronze	
Downhill	Corinne Suter; Switzerland	1:34.27	Kira Weidle; Germany	1:34.47	Lara Gut-Behrami; Switzerland	1:34.64
Super-G	Lara Gut-Behrami; Switzerland	1:25.51	Corinne Suter; Switzerland	1:25.85	Mikaela Shiffrin; United States	1:25.98
Giant slalom	Lara Gut-Behrami; Switzerland	2:30.66	Mikaela Shiffrin; United States	2:30.68	Katharina Liensberger; Austria	2:30.75
Slalom	Katharina Liensberger; Austria	1:39.50	Petra Vlhová; Slovakia	1:40.50	Mikaela Shiffrin; United States	1:41.48
Alpine combined	Mikaela Shiffrin; United States	2:07.22	Petra Vlhová; Slovakia	2:08.08	Michelle Gisin; Switzerland	2:08.11
Parallel giant slalom	Marta Bassino; Italy; Katharina Liensberger; Austria		None awarded		Tessa Worley; France	

=== Mixed ===
Event	Gold	Silver	Bronze
Team parallel event	Norway; Sebastian Foss-Solevåg; Kristin Lysdahl; Kristina Riis-Johannessen; Fabian Wilkens Solheim; Thea Louise Stjernesund	Sweden; Estelle Alphand; William Hansson; Sara Hector; Kristoffer Jakobsen; Jonna Luthman; Mattias Rönngren	Germany; Emma Aicher; Lena Dürr; Andrea Filser; Stefan Luitz; Alexander Schmid; Linus Straßer

== Participating countries ==
A total of 68 countries competed

- Albania (5)
- Andorra (3)
- Argentina (5)
- Armenia (3)
- Australia (2)
- Austria (23)
- Belarus (1)
- Belgium (7)
- Bolivia (1)
- Bosnia and Herzegovina (8)
- Brazil (3)
- Bulgaria (5)
- Canada (13)
- Chile (4)
- Chinese Taipei (1)
- Colombia (1)
- Croatia (8)
- Cyprus (6)
- Czech Republic (7)
- Denmark (5)
- Estonia (2)
- Finland (3)
- France (17)
- Georgia (5)
- Germany (13)
- United Kingdom (7)
- Greece (12)
- Haiti (4)
- Hungary (9)
- Iceland (9)
- India (2)
- Iran (8)
- Ireland (3)
- Israel (4)
- Italy (24) (host nation)
- Japan (4)
- Kenya (1)
- Kosovo (3)
- Latvia (11)
- Lebanon (8)
- Liechtenstein (3)
- Lithuania (5)
- Luxembourg (1)
- Mexico (2)
- Monaco (1)
- Montenegro (5)
- Morocco (2)
- Nepal (1)
- Netherlands (1)
- New Zealand (4)
- North Macedonia (6)
- Norway (13)
- Peru (1)
- Poland (2)
- Portugal (3)
- Romania (3)
- Russian Ski Federation (9)
- San Marino (2)
- Serbia (6)
- Slovakia (6)
- Slovenia (16)
- South Korea (1)
- Spain (6)
- Sweden (11)
- Switzerland (19)
- Timor-Leste (1)
- Ukraine (8)
- United States (17)
