= 2018 Alpine Skiing World Cup – Men's downhill =

Alpine ski discipline year standings

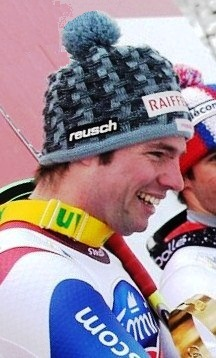
2018 Men's downhill World Cup: Beat Feuz of Switzerland, season champion; 2018 Men's World Cup; Overall • Downhill • Super-G; Giant slalom • Slalom • Combined
Previous: 2017	Next: 2019

The men's downhill in the 2018 FIS Alpine Skiing World Cup involved nine events, including the season finale in Åre, Sweden. Swiss skier Beat Feuz ended the two-season reign of Italy's Peter Fill and won the season title in this discipline after a season-long battle with former discipline champion Aksel Lund Svindal of Norway.

The season was interrupted by the 2018 Winter Olympics from 12-24 February 2018 at Yongpyong Alpine Centre (slalom and giant slalom) at the Alpensia Sports Park in PyeongChang and at the Jeongseon Alpine Centre (speed events) in Jeongseon, South Korea. The men's downhill was scheduled to be held on 11 February, but high winds forced its postponement until 15 February.

== Standings ==
Rank	Name	25 Nov 2017; Lake Louise (Canada)	2 Dec 2017; Beaver Creek (United States)	16 Dec 2017; Val Gardena/Gröden (Italy)	28 Dec 2017; Bormio (Italy)	13 Jan 2018; Wengen (Switzerland)	20 Jan 2018; Kitzbühel (Austria)	27 Jan 2018; Garmisch-Partenkirchen (Germany)	10 Mar 2018; Kvitfjell (Norway)	14 Mar 2018; Åre (Sweden)	Total
	(Switzerland) Beat Feuz	100	80	32	50	100	80	100	80	60	682
2	(Norway) Aksel Lund Svindal	60	100	100	80	80	32	50	60	50	612
3	(Germany) Thomas Dreßen	18	60	20	22	45	100	36	100	45	446
4	(Italy) Dominik Paris	15	45	40	100	32	22	80	32	20	386
5	(Austria) Vincent Kriechmayr	29	40	13	3	40	50	80	29	100	384
6	(Austria) Matthias Mayer	80	22	14	40	60	0	32	DNF	100	348
7	(Norway) Kjetil Jansrud	45	24	80	60	29	26	DNS	50	29	343
8	(Austria) Hannes Reichelt	12	9	7	45	50	60	45	22	18	268
9	(France) Adrien Théaux	36	32	10	36	24	20	20	36	24	238
10	(Austria) Max Franz	24	15	60	32	20	DNS	0	20	36	207
11	(Italy) Peter Fill	50	26	0	20	26	29	40	DNS		191
12	(Switzerland) Mauro Caviezel	32	20	26	18	9	18	14	40	0	177
13	(Italy) Christof Innerhofer	0	50	45	18	DNF	DNF	18	45	0	176
14	(Norway) Aleksander Aamodt Kilde	40	18	13	26	14	13	22	11	0	157
15	(France) Brice Roger	0	14	10	6	0	36	29	26	26	147
16	(Germany) Andreas Sander	16	36	22	1	2	40	24	0	0	141
17	(Canada) Manuel Osborne-Paradis	11	16	16	26	11	8	3	18	16	125
18	(France) Johan Clarey	14	29	0	8	2	DNF	12	24	32	121
19	(Switzerland) Gilles Roulin	22	3	50	5	18	5	1	5	0	109
20	(United States) Bryce Bennett	10	10	24	15	14	3	15	14	0	105
21	(France) Maxence Muzaton	0	0	0	0	36	15	10	2	40	103
22	(Austria) Romed Baumann	26	0	40	5	4	0	DNF	0	0	75
23	(Switzerland) Marc Gisin	0	2	0	12	12	45	0	0	0	71
24	(Slovenia) Martin Čater	6	0	0	0	24	0	16	13	0	59
25	(Italy) Emanuele Buzzi	0	0	0	0	8	24	26	0	DNF	58
	References										

- Winner
- 2nd place
- 3rd place
- DNF = Did Not Finish
- DNS = Did Not Start
- Updated at 18 March 2018, after all events.

== See also ==
- 2018 Alpine Skiing World Cup – Men's summary rankings
- 2018 Alpine Skiing World Cup – Men's overall
- 2018 Alpine Skiing World Cup – Men's super-G
- 2018 Alpine Skiing World Cup – Men's giant slalom
- 2018 Alpine Skiing World Cup – Men's slalom
- 2018 Alpine Skiing World Cup – Men's combined
- World Cup scoring system
