= Alpine skiing at the 2022 Winter Olympics – Men's slalom =

Men's slalom at the XXIV Olympic Winter Games
- Alpine skiing
- Venue: Ice River, Yanqing District
- Date: 16 February 2022
- Competitors: 88 from 61 nations
- Winning time: 1:44.09

Medalists
1st place, gold medalist(s)		Clément Noël	France
2nd place, silver medalist(s)		Johannes Strolz	Austria
3rd place, bronze medalist(s)		Sebastian Foss-Solevåg	Norway

The men's slalom competition of the Beijing 2022 Olympics was held on 16 February, on "Ice River" course at the Yanqing National Alpine Ski Centre in Yanqing District. Clément Noël of France won the event, this became his first Olympic medal. Johannes Strolz of Austria won the silver medal, and Sebastian Foss-Solevåg of Norway bronze.

André Myhrer, the 2018 champion, retired from competitions. The silver medalist, Ramon Zenhäusern, and the bronze medalist, Michael Matt, qualified for the Olympics. During the World Cup season, six slalom events were held before the Olympics: Lucas Braathen was leading the ranking, followed by Foss-Solevåg, Manuel Feller, Linus Straßer, and Daniel Yule. Foss-Solevåg was the reigning world champion, with Adrian Pertl and Henrik Kristoffersen being the silver and bronze medalists, respectively.

== Results ==
Results are as follows:

Rank	Bib	Name	Nation	Run 1	Rank	Run 2	Rank	Total	Behind
1st place, gold medalist(s)	4	Clément Noël	France	54.30	6	49.79	1	1:44.09	—
2nd place, silver medalist(s)	19	Johannes Strolz	Austria	53.92	1	50.78	13	1:44.70	+0.61
3rd place, bronze medalist(s)	2	Sebastian Foss-Solevåg	Norway	53.98	3	50.81	15	1:44.79	+0.70
4	3	Henrik Kristoffersen	Norway	53.94	2	50.94	18	1:44.88	+0.79
5	11	Loïc Meillard	Switzerland	54.22	4	50.67	10	1:44.89	+0.80
6	15	Daniel Yule	Switzerland	55.06	13	49.89	2	1:44.95	+0.86
7	5	Linus Straßer	Germany	54.25	5	50.77	12	1:45.02	+0.93
8	18	Giuliano Razzoli	Italy	54.79	12	50.26	4	1:45.05	+0.96
9	22	Albert Popov	Bulgaria	54.62	9	50.53	8	1:45.15	+1.06
10	21	Aleksandr Khoroshilov	ROC	54.63	10	50.54	9	1:45.17	+1.08
11	20	Tommaso Sala	Italy	54.37	8	51.00	19	1:45.37	+1.28
12	1	Ramon Zenhäusern	Switzerland	54.72	11	50.75	11	1:45.47	+1.38
13	13	Dave Ryding	Great Britain	55.13	16	50.44	7	1:45.57	+1.48
14	17	Luca Aerni	Switzerland	55.63	19	50.20	3	1:45.83	+1.74
15	30	Samuel Kolega	Croatia	55.54	18	50.42	6	1:45.96	+1.87
16	8	Alexis Pinturault	France	55.12	15	51.03	20	1:46.15	+2.05
17	6	Marco Schwarz	Austria	56.26	25	50.35	5	1:46.61	+2.52
18	16	Filip Zubčić	Croatia	55.79	21	50.89	17	1:46.68	+2.59
19	39	Alexander Schmid	Germany	55.95	23	51.08	21	1:47.03	+2.94
20	27	Matej Vidović	Croatia	56.57	26	50.79	14	1:47.36	+3.27
21	33	Jung Dong-hyun	South Korea	56.85	29	50.84	16	1:47.69	+3.60
22	24	Armand Marchant	Belgium	56.13	24	51.72	22	1:47.85	+3.76
23	49	Barnabás Szőllős	Israel	56.83	28	51.88	23	1:48.71	+4.62
24	26	Erik Read	Canada	55.90	22	53.20	24	1:49.10	+5.01
25	42	Adam Žampa	Slovakia	57.76	32	53.25	25	1:51.01	+6.92
26	50	Aleksandr Andrienko	ROC	57.47	31	53.70	26	1:51.17	+7.08
27	53	Emir Lokmić	Bosnia and Herzegovina	58.86	35	53.94	27	1:52.80	+8.71
28	60	Denni Xhepa	Albania	58.32	34	54.96	29	1:53.28	+9.19
29	52	Ioannis Antoniou	Greece	59.48	36	54.81	28	1:54.29	+10.20
30	55	Casper Dyrbye Næsted	Denmark	1:01.38	38	55.89	31	1:57.27	+13.18
31	23	Atle Lie McGrath	Norway	55.08	14	1:02.27	41	1:57.35	+13.26
32	66	Soso Japharidze	Georgia	1:02.02	41	55.87	30	1:57.89	+13.80
33	58	Márton Kékesi	Hungary	1:01.85	40	56.12	32	1:57.97	+13.88
34	73	Richardson Viano	Haiti	1:02.25	42	57.74	33	1:59.99	+15.90
35	64	Alexandru Ștefănescu	Romania	1:01.72	39	58.70	35	2:00.42	+16.33
36	72	Zakhar Kuchin	Kazakhstan	1:03.68	43	58.98	37	2:02.66	+18.57
37	77	Albin Tahiri	Kosovo	1:04.01	44	58.93	36	2:02.94	+18.85
38	78	Cesar Arnouk	Lebanon	1:07.05	47	58.37	34	2:05.42	+21.33
39	82	Ricardo Brancal	Portugal	1:06.24	46	1:00.07	38	2:06.31	+22.22
40	68	Nicola Zanon	Thailand	1:05.71	45	1:02.24	40	2:07.95	+23.86
41	86	Mathieu Neumuller	Madagascar	1:07.90	48	1:02.88	43	2:10.78	+26.69
42	62	Eldar Salihović	Montenegro	1:09.61	50	1:02.21	39	2:11.82	+27.73
43	83	Matteo Gatti	San Marino	1:08.52	49	1:03.41	44	2:11.93	+27.84
44	88	William Flaherty	Puerto Rico	1:09.86	51	1:02.57	42	2:12.43	+28.34
45	80	Yohan Goutt Gonçalves	Timor-Leste	1:15.48	52	1:09.19	45	2:24.67	+40.58
	10	Michael Matt	Austria	54.36	7	DNF		—N/a	
	12	Alex Vinatzer	Italy	55.39	17	DNF		—N/a	
	38	Kamen Zlatkov	Bulgaria	55.66	20	DNF		—N/a	
	40	Dries Van den Broecke	Belgium	56.77	27	DNF		—N/a	
	56	Andreas Žampa	Slovakia	58.06	33	DNF		—N/a	
	57	Michel Macedo	Brazil	59.88	37	DNF		—N/a	
	43	Michał Jasiczek	Poland	57.40	30	DSQ		—N/a	
	7	Manuel Feller	Austria	DNF		—N/a			
	9	Kristoffer Jakobsen	Sweden	DNF		—N/a			
	14	Lucas Braathen	Norway	DNF		—N/a			
	25	Luke Winters	United States	DNF		—N/a			
	28	Yohei Koyama	Japan	DNF		—N/a			
	29	Joaquim Salarich	Spain	DNF		—N/a			
	31	Zan Kranjec	Slovenia	DNF		—N/a			
	32	Billy Major	Great Britain	DNF		—N/a			
	34	Jan Zabystřan	Czech Republic	DNF		—N/a			
	35	Trevor Philp	Canada	DNF		—N/a			
	36	Kryštof Krýzl	Czech Republic	DNF		—N/a			
	37	Julian Rauchfuss	Germany	DNF		—N/a			
	41	Ivan Kuznetsov	ROC	DNF		—N/a			
	44	Tormis Laine	Estonia	DNF		—N/a			
	45	Sam Maes	Belgium	DNF		—N/a			
	46	Louis Muhlen-Schulte	Australia	DNF		—N/a			
	47	Sturla Snær Snorrason	Iceland	DNF		—N/a			
	48	Miks Zvejnieks	Latvia	DNF		—N/a			
	51	Paweł Pyjas	Poland	DNF		—N/a			
	54	Tomás Birkner de Miguel	Argentina	DNF		—N/a			
	59	Matthieu Osch	Luxembourg	DNF		—N/a			
	63	Michael Poettoz	Colombia	DNF		—N/a			
	65	Asa Miller	Philippines	DNF		—N/a			
	67	Ivan Kovbasnyuk	Ukraine	DNF		—N/a			
	69	Adrian Yung	Hong Kong	DNF		—N/a			
	70	Yianno Kouyoumdjian	Cyprus	DNF		—N/a			
	71	Ho Ping-jui	Chinese Taipei	DNF		—N/a			
	75	Berkin Usta	Turkey	DNF		—N/a			
	76	Jeffrey Webb	Malaysia	DNF		—N/a			
	79	Arif Khan	India	DNF		—N/a			
	81	Maxim Gordeev	Kyrgyzstan	DNF		—N/a			
	84	Xu Mingfu	China	DNF		—N/a			
	85	Zhang Yangming	China	DNF		—N/a			
	87	Muhammad Karim	Pakistan	DNF		—N/a			
	74	Komiljon Tukhtaev	Uzbekistan	DSQ		—N/a			
	61	Andrej Drukarov	Lithuania	DNS		—N/a			
