= FIS Alpine World Ski Championships 2021 – Men's slalom =

Men's slalom at the FIS Alpine World Ski Championships 2021
- Location: Cortina d'Ampezzo, Italy
- Dates: 21 February; 20 February (qualification)
- Competitors: 100 from 54 nations
- Winning time: 1:46.48

Medalists
gold medal	Sebastian Foss-Solevåg	Norway
silver medal	Adrian Pertl	Austria
bronze medal	Henrik Kristoffersen	Norway

Men's Slalom
- Location: Druscié; Cortina d'Ampezzo, Italy
- Vertical: 210 m (689 ft)
- Top elevation: 1,700 m (5,577 ft)
- Base elevation: 1,490 m (4,888 ft)

The Men's slalom competition of the FIS Alpine World Ski Championships 2021 was held on 21 February, with a qualification on 20 February 2021.

== Results ==
=== Final ===
The first run was started on 21 February at 10:00, and the second run at 13:30.

Rank	Bib	Name	Nation	Run 1	Rank	Run 2	Rank	Total	Diff
1st place, gold medalist(s)	2	Sebastian Foss-Solevåg	Norway	52.40	3	54.08	1	1:46.48	—
2nd place, silver medalist(s)	8	Adrian Pertl	Austria	52.24	1	54.45	3	1:46.69	+0.21
3rd place, bronze medalist(s)	4	Henrik Kristoffersen	Norway	52.62	6	54.32	2	1:46.94	+0.46
4	17	Alex Vinatzer	Italy	52.38	2	55.30	10	1:47.68	+1.20
5	9	Daniel Yule	Switzerland	52.88	9	54.82	5	1:47.70	+1.22
6	31	Istok Rodeš	Croatia	53.22	14	54.62	4	1:47.84	+1.36
7	22	Štefan Hadalin	Slovenia	53.06	11	54.92	7	1:47.98	+1.50
7	1	Alexis Pinturault	France	52.65	7	55.33	11	1:47.98	+1.50
9	10	Michael Matt	Austria	53.19	13	54.85	6	1:48.04	+1.56
10	29	Armand Marchant	Belgium	53.13	12	55.09	8	1:48.22	+1.74
11	3	Ramon Zenhäusern	Switzerland	53.89	21	55.09	8	1:48.98	+2.50
12	30	Matej Vidović	Croatia	53.44	16	55.58	12	1:49.02	+2.54
13	34	Benjamin Ritchie	United States	53.51	17	55.72	13	1:49.23	+2.75
14	19	Manfred Mölgg	Italy	53.64	20	55.89	14	1:49.53	+3.05
15	15	Linus Straßer	Germany	53.95	23	55.89	14	1:49.84	+3.36
16	49	Simon Efimov	Russian Ski Federation	53.55	19	56.75	16	1:50.30	+3.82
17	36	Ondřej Berndt	Czech Republic	54.75	27	57.25	17	1:52.00	+5.52
18	51	Tijan Marovt	Slovenia	55.30	28	57.60	18	1:52.90	+6.42
19	44	Aljaž Dvornik	Slovenia	56.31	32	58.01	19	1:54.32	+7.84
20	50	Alex Puente Tasias	Spain	55.89	31	58.69	20	1:54.58	+8.10
21	5	Clément Noël	France	52.58	5	1:04.03	29	1:56.61	+10.13
22	60	Nikita Alekhin	Russian Ski Federation	56.48	33	1:00.29	21	1:56.77	+10.29
23	66	Cormac Comerford	Ireland	59.37	40	1:00.67	22	2:00.04	+13.56
24	73	Filip Baláž	Slovakia	58.28	38	1:02.27	24	2:00.55	+14.07
25	84	Márton Kékesi	Hungary	1:00.12	41	1:00.87	23	2:00.99	+14.51
26	64	Casper Dyrbye Næsted	Denmark	58.87	39	1:02.48	25	2:01.35	+14.87
27	58	Cristian Javier Simari Birkner	Argentina	58.17	37	1:03.65	27	2:01.82	+15.34
28	79	Matthieu Osch	Luxembourg	1:00.21	42	1:03.18	26	2:03.39	+16.91
29	80	Erjon Tola	Albania	1:01.20	43	1:03.96	28	2:05.16	+18.68
30	88	Ivan Kovbasnyuk	Ukraine	1:02.07	46	1:05.12	30	2:07.19	+20.71
31	87	Dardan Dehari	North Macedonia	1:02.42	47	1:07.21	32	2:09.63	+23.15
32	94	Albin Tahiri	Kosovo	1:04.63	49	1:07.84	33	2:12.47	+25.99
33	96	Cesar Arnouk	Lebanon	1:06.17	52	1:06.92	31	2:13.09	+26.61
34	89	Behnam Kia Shemshaki	Iran	1:06.67	53	1:09.53	34	2:16.20	+29.72
35	98	Alberto Tamagnini	San Marino	1:06.97	54	1:11.14	35	2:18.11	+31.63
36	91	Yianno Kouyoumdjian	Cyprus	1:06.11	51	1:16.63	36	2:22.74	+36.26
37	97	Yohan Goutt Gonçalves	Timor-Leste	1:12.62	55	1:20.60	37	2:33.22	+46.74
	20	Kristoffer Jakobsen	Sweden	52.42	4	Did not finish			
	7	Marco Schwarz	Austria	52.81	8	Did not finish			
	43	Jett Seymour	United States	52.92	10	Did not finish			
	38	Luke Winters	United States	53.36	15	Did not finish			
	23	Albert Popov	Bulgaria	53.54	18	Did not finish			
	33	AJ Ginnis	Greece	53.90	22	Did not finish			
	6	Manuel Feller	Austria	54.02	24	Did not finish			
	16	Filip Zubčić	Croatia	54.24	25	Did not finish			
	27	Erik Read	Canada	54.46	26	Did not finish			
	54	Tom Verbeke	Belgium	55.43	29	Did not finish			
	45	Joaquim Salarich	Spain	55.48	30	Did not finish			
	52	Tormis Laine	Estonia	57.04	34	Did not finish			
	71	Jack Adams	New Zealand	57.47	35	Did not finish			
	67	Juan Pablo Vallecillo	Argentina	58.11	36	Did not finish			
	93	Richardson Viano	Haiti	1:01.34	44	Did not finish			
	85	Baptiste Aranjo	Portugal	1:01.76	45	Did not finish			
	92	Harutyun Harutyunyan	Armenia	1:03.44	48	Did not finish			
	83	Michael Poettoz	Colombia	1:04.84	50	Did not finish			
	11	Alexander Khoroshilov	Russian Ski Federation	Did not finish					
	12	Loïc Meillard	Switzerland	Did not finish					
	13	Victor Muffat-Jeandet	France	Did not finish					
	14	Dave Ryding	Great Britain	Did not finish					
	18	Luca Aerni	Switzerland	Did not finish					
	21	Jean-Baptiste Grange	France	Did not finish					
	24	Stefano Gross	Italy	Did not finish					
	25	Timon Haugan	Norway	Did not finish					
	28	Sebastian Holzmann	Germany	Did not finish					
	32	Žan Kranjec	Slovenia	Did not finish					
	35	Samuel Kolega	Croatia	Did not finish					
	37	Jan Zabystřan	Czech Republic	Did not finish					
	39	Billy Major	Great Britain	Did not finish					
	40	Juan del Campo	Spain	Did not finish					
	41	Laurie Taylor	Great Britain	Did not finish					
	42	William Hansson	Sweden	Did not finish					
	46	Kryštof Krýzl	Czech Republic	Did not finish					
	47	Yohei Koyama	Japan	Did not finish					
	48	Dries Van den Broecke	Belgium	Did not finish					
	53	Alex Leever	United States	Did not finish					
	55	Seigo Kato	Japan	Did not finish					
	56	Hong Dong-kwan	South Korea	Did not finish					
	57	Kamen Zlatkov	Bulgaria	Did not finish					
	59	Sturla Snær Snorrason	Iceland	Did not finish					
	61	Emir Lokmić	Bosnia and Herzegovina	Did not finish					
	62	Juhan Luik	Estonia	Did not finish					
	63	Strahinja Stanišić	Serbia	Did not finish					
	65	Kalin Zlatkov	Bulgaria	Did not finish					
	68	Itamar Biran	Israel	Did not finish					
	69	Ioannis Proios	Greece	Did not finish					
	70	Eliot Grandjean	Belgium	Did not finish					
	72	Andrej Drukarov	Lithuania	Did not finish					
	74	Michel Macedo	Brazil	Did not finish					
	75	Ioannis Antoniou	Greece	Did not finish					
	76	Elvis Opmanis	Latvia	Did not finish					
	77	Andrés Figueroa	Chile	Did not finish					
	78	Konstantin Stoilov	Bulgaria	Did not finish					
	81	Marcus Vorre	Denmark	Did not finish					
	82	Eldar Salihović	Montenegro	Did not finish					
	86	Kevin Qerimi	Albania	Did not finish					
	90	Alexandru Stefanescu	Romania	Did not finish					
	95	Besarion Japaridze	Georgia	Did not finish					
	99	Tang Calcy Ning-chien	Chinese Taipei	Did not finish					
	100	Yassine Aouich	Morocco	Did not finish					
	26	Giuliano Razzoli	Italy	Disqualified					

=== Qualification ===
The first run was started on 20 February at 10:00, and the second run at 13:30.

Rank	Bib	Name	Nation	Run 1	Rank	Run 2	Rank	Total	Diff	Notes
1	4	Seigo Kato	Japan	47.02	1	48.60	3	1:35.62		Q
2	8	Kamen Zlatkov	Bulgaria	47.97	4	48.28	2	1:36.25	+0.63	Q
3	25	Itamar Biran	Israel	47.54	3	48.72	4	1:36.26	+0.64	Q
4	7	Sturla Snær Snorrason	Iceland	47.22	2	49.05	5	1:36.27	+0.65	Q
5	22	Kalin Zlatkov	Bulgaria	48.59	9	47.86	1	1:36.45	+0.83	Q
6	2	Tom Verbeke	Belgium	47.97	4	49.22	7	1:37.19	+1.57	Q
7	11	Nikita Alekhin	Russian Ski Federation	48.49	8	49.11	6	1:37.60	+1.98	Q
8	28	Eliot Grandjean	Belgium	48.04	6	49.60	8	1:37.64	+2.02	Q
9	5	Tormis Laine	Estonia	48.44	7	49.80	10	1:38.24	+2.62	Q
10	12	Alex Leever	United States	48.93	10	49.96	12	1:38.89	+3.27	Q
11	6	Juhan Luik	Estonia	49.22	11	50.15	14	1:39.37	+3.75	Q
12	15	Cristian Javier Simari Birkner	Argentina	49.52	12	50.06	13	1:39.58	+3.96	Q
13	27	Ioannis Proios	Greece	49.96	14	49.71	9	1:39.67	+4.05	Q
14	13	Tijan Marovt	Slovenia	49.68	13	50.97	19	1:40.65	+5.03	Q
15	39	Konstantin Stoilov	Bulgaria	51.14	18	50.23	15	1:41.37	+5.75	Q
16	35	Elvis Opmanis	Latvia	51.11	17	50.81	18	1:41.92	+6.30	Q
17	34	Ioannis Antoniou	Greece	51.42	19	50.78	17	1:42.20	+6.58	Q
18	54	Kevin Qerimi	Albania	52.51	22	49.82	11	1:42.33	+6.71	Q
19	20	Casper Dyrbye Næsted	Denmark	50.83	15	51.58	24	1:42.41	+6.79	Q
20	42	Matthieu Osch	Luxembourg	51.88	21	50.98	20	1:42.86	+7.24	Q
21	24	Juan Pablo Vallecillo	Argentina	50.95	16	51.95	26	1:42.90	+7.28	Q
22	48	Márton Kékesi	Hungary	53.19	28	50.34	16	1:43.53	+7.91	Q
23	44	Erjon Tola	Albania	52.72	24	51.12	21	1:43.84	+8.22	Q
24	82	Besarion Japaridze	Georgia	52.78	25	51.53	23	1:44.31	+8.69	Q
25	45	Marcus Vorre	Denmark	51.63	20	53.00	29	1:44.63	+9.01	Q
26	37	Nikolaos Tziovas	Greece	53.07	27	51.67	25	1:44.74	+9.12	
27	40	Tamás Trunk	Hungary	52.51	22	52.77	28	1:45.28	+9.66	
28	55	Dardan Dehari	North Macedonia	54.37	29	51.41	22	1:45.78	+10.16	q
29	56	Ivan Kovbasnyuk	Ukraine	54.93	31	52.45	27	1:47.38	+11.76	q
30	52	Baptiste Aranjo	Portugal	54.42	30	54.67	33	1:49.09	+13.47	q
31	71	Gauti Guðmundsson	Iceland	57.63	39	53.02	30	1:50.65	+15.03	
32	69	Yianno Kouyoumdjian	Cyprus	57.26	38	53.91	31	1:51.17	+15.55	q
33	80	Albin Tahiri	Kosovo	56.57	34	54.65	32	1:51.22	+15.60	q
34	57	Behnam Kia Shemshaki	Iran	56.19	32	55.06	34	1:51.25	+15.63	q
35	96	Ricardo Brancal	Portugal	58.20	42	55.77	35	1:53.97	+18.35	
36	85	Christopher Holm	Brazil	57.88	40	56.36	36	1:54.24	+18.62	
36	63	Nima Baha	Iran	56.50	33	57.74	39	1:54.24	+18.62	
38	102	Alberto Tamagnini	San Marino	58.11	41	57.35	37	1:55.46	+19.84	q
39	73	Gustavs Ābele	Latvia	59.97	45	58.10	41	1:58.07	+22.45	
40	95	Matteo Gatti	San Marino	1:00.95	46	57.47	38	1:58.42	+22.80	
41	77	Demetrios Maxim	Cyprus	1:01.04	47	58.00	40	1:59.04	+23.42	
42	87	Vakaris Jokūbas Lapienis	Lithuania	58.96	44	1:03.24	43	2:02.20	+26.58	
43	81	Arbi Pupovci	Kosovo	1:05.78	48	59.31	42	2:05.09	+29.47	
44	109	Saphal-Ram Shrestha	Nepal	1:10.04	49	1:05.82	44	2:15.86	+40.24	
45	108	Yassine Aouich	Morocco	1:16.73	50	1:11.71	45	2:28.44	+52.82	q
	61	Mihajlo Đorđević	Serbia	52.97	26	Did not finish				
	88	Ezio Leonetti	Albania	56.61	35	Did not finish				
	67	Viktor Petkov	North Macedonia	56.97	36	Did not finish				
	86	Cesar Arnouk	Lebanon	57.09	37	Did not finish				q
	72	Harutyun Harutyunyan	Armenia	58.43	43	Did not finish				q
	1	Willis Feasey	New Zealand	Did not finish						
	3	Tomás Birkner de Miguel	Argentina	Did not finish						
	9	Miks Zvejnieks	Latvia	Did not finish						
	10	Hong Dong-kwan	South Korea	Did not finish						q
	14	Emir Lokmić	Bosnia and Herzegovina	Did not finish						q
	16	Benjamin Szőllős	Israel	Did not finish						
	17	Marko Šljivić	Bosnia and Herzegovina	Did not finish						
	18	Alec Scott	Ireland	Did not finish						
	19	Strahinja Stanišić	Serbia	Did not finish						q
	21	Barnabás Szőllős	Israel	Did not finish						
	23	Cormac Comerford	Ireland	Did not finish						q
	26	Hugh McAdam	Australia	Did not finish						
	29	Žaks Gedra	Latvia	Did not finish						
	30	Jack Adams	New Zealand	Did not finish						q
	31	Andrej Drukarov	Lithuania	Did not finish						q
	32	Filip Baláž	Slovakia	Did not finish						q
	33	Michel Macedo	Brazil	Did not finish						q
	38	Andrés Figueroa	Chile	Did not finish						q
	41	Bálint Úry	Hungary	Did not finish						
	43	Bence Nagy	Hungary	Did not finish						
	46	Eldar Salihović	Montenegro	Did not finish						q
	47	Michael Poettoz	Colombia	Did not finish						q
	50	Dino Terzić	Bosnia and Herzegovina	Did not finish						
	51	Nicolás Pirozzi	Chile	Did not finish						
	53	Bjarki Guðmundsson	Iceland	Did not finish						
	58	Christian Skov Jensen	Denmark	Did not finish						
	59	Rastko Blagojević	Serbia	Did not finish						
	60	Georg Fannar Þórðarson	Iceland	Did not finish						
	62	Pouria Saveh Shemshaki	Iran	Did not finish						
	64	Veselin Zlatković	Serbia	Did not finish						
	65	Maksym Mariichyn	Ukraine	Did not finish						
	66	Harun Kunovac	Bosnia and Herzegovina	Did not finish						
	68	Alexandru Stefanescu	Romania	Did not finish						q
	70	Mykhailo Karpushyn	Ukraine	Did not finish						
	74	Mirko Lazareski	North Macedonia	Did not finish						
	75	Ashot Karapetyan	Armenia	Did not finish						
	76	Levko Tsibelenko	Ukraine	Did not finish						
	78	Richardson Viano	Haiti	Did not finish						q
	83	Soso Japharidze	Georgia	Did not finish						
	84	Bojan Kosić	Montenegro	Did not finish						
	89	Sandro Zhorzholiani	Georgia	Did not finish						
	90	Naim Fenianos	Lebanon	Did not finish						
	91	Valentino Caputi	Brazil	Did not finish						
	92	Vladimir Vukmirović	Montenegro	Did not finish						
	93	Cyril Kayrouz	Lebanon	Did not finish						
	94	Marcus Riis	Denmark	Did not finish						
	97	Yohan Goutt Gonçalves	Timor-Leste	Did not finish						q
	98	Nodar Kozanashvili	Georgia	Did not finish						
	99	Mackenson Florindo	Haiti	Did not finish						
	100	Ray Iskandar	Lebanon	Did not finish						
	101	Andreas Epiphaniou	Cyprus	Did not finish						
	103	Vlatko Anastasoski	North Macedonia	Did not finish						
	104	Tang Calcy Ning-chien	Chinese Taipei	Did not finish						q
	105	Mahdi Idhya	Morocco	Did not finish						
	106	Hubertus Von Hohenlohe	Mexico	Did not finish						
	107	Hayk Geghamyan	Armenia	Did not finish						
	110	Vasil Veriga	Albania	Did not finish						
	112	Arif Khan	India	Did not finish						
	111	Jean-Pierre Roy	Haiti	Disqualified						
	36	Kai Horwitz	Chile	Did not start						
	49	Seyed Morteza Jafari	Iran	Did not start						
	79	Vilius Aleksandravičius	Lithuania	Did not start						
