= FIS Alpine World Ski Championships 2021 – Men's giant slalom =

Men's giant slalom at the FIS Alpine World Ski Championships 2021
- Location: Cortina d'Ampezzo, Italy
- Dates: 19 February; 18 February (qualification)
- Competitors: 160 from 63 nations
- Winning time: 2:37.25

Medalists
gold medal	Mathieu Faivre	France
silver medal	Luca De Aliprandini	Italy
bronze medal	Marco Schwarz	Austria

Men's Giant Slalom
- Location: Labirinti (labyrinths); Cortina d'Ampezzo, Italy
- Vertical: 450 m (1,476 ft)
- Top elevation: 2,010 m (6,594 ft)
- Base elevation: 1,560 m (5,118 ft)

The Men's giant slalom competition at the FIS Alpine World Ski Championships 2021 was held on 19 February. A qualification was held on 18 February 2021.

== Results ==
=== Final ===
The first run was started on 19 February at 10:00, and the second run at 13:30.

Rank	Bib	Name	Nation	Run 1	Rank	Run 2	Rank	Total	Diff
1st place, gold medalist(s)	9	Mathieu Faivre	France	1:18.13	4	1:19.12	4	2:37.25	—
2nd place, silver medalist(s)	12	Luca De Aliprandini	Italy	1:17.95	2	1:19.93	11	2:37.88	+0.63
3rd place, bronze medalist(s)	16	Marco Schwarz	Austria	1:19.11	6	1:19.01	2	2:38.12	+0.87
4	2	Filip Zubčić	Croatia	1:19.67	11	1:19.17	5	2:38.84	+1.59
5	7	Loïc Meillard	Switzerland	1:18.80	5	1:20.22	14	2:39.02	+1.77
6	5	Žan Kranjec	Slovenia	1:19.37	7	1:19.71	7	2:39.08	+1.83
7	20	Stefan Luitz	Germany	1:19.63	10	1:19.61	6	2:39.24	+1.99
8	19	Adam Žampa	Slovakia	1:20.71	20	1:19.02	3	2:39.73	+2.48
9	3	Henrik Kristoffersen	Norway	1:19.87	15	1:19.91	10	2:39.78	+2.53
10	13	Roland Leitinger	Austria	1:19.70	12	1:20.42	15	2:40.12	+2.87
11	26	River Radamus	United States	1:19.61	9	1:20.98	18	2:40.59	+3.34
12	24	Riccardo Tonetti	Italy	1:19.78	14	1:20.91	17	2:40.69	+3.44
13	8	Victor Muffat-Jeandet	France	1:20.97	21	1:20.12	13	2:41.09	+3.84
14	37	Giovanni Franzoni	Italy	1:21.39	23	1:19.80	8	2:41.19	+3.94
15	35	Samu Torsti	Finland	1:19.96	16	1:21.37	20	2:41.33	+4.08
16	6	Leif Kristian Nestvold-Haugen	Norway	1:21.61	24	1:19.95	12	2:41.56	+4.31
16	28	Štefan Hadalin	Slovenia	1:22.61	29	1:18.95	1	2:41.56	+4.31
18	34	Seigo Kato	Japan	1:21.76	26	1:19.82	9	2:41.58	+4.33
19	36	Kryštof Krýzl	Czech Republic	1:21.14	22	1:20.89	16	2:42.03	+4.78
20	30	Andreas Žampa	Slovakia	1:21.71	25	1:21.31	19	2:43.02	+5.77
21	45	Albert Ortega	Spain	1:22.07	27	1:21.50	21	2:43.57	+6.32
22	62	Tiziano Gravier	Argentina	1:22.35	28	1:22.27	22	2:44.62	+7.37
23	40	Andrej Drukarov	Lithuania	1:23.07	30	1:22.82	23	2:45.89	+8.64
24	58	Albert Popov	Bulgaria	1:23.09	31	1:22.86	24	2:45.95	+8.70
25	61	Barnabás Szőllős	Israel	1:23.49	33	1:24.27	25	2:47.76	+10.51
26	42	Willis Feasey	New Zealand	1:24.09	35	1:25.59	28	2:49.68	+12.43
27	52	Cristian Javier Simari Birkner	Argentina	1:24.57	36	1:25.27	26	2:49.84	+12.59
28	74	Emir Lokmić	Bosnia and Herzegovina	1:25.13	39	1:25.27	26	2:50.40	+13.15
29	66	Nicolás Pirozzi	Chile	1:25.09	38	1:26.14	29	2:51.23	+13.98
30	69	Tom Verbeke	Belgium	1:25.03	37	1:27.35	32	2:52.38	+15.13
31	79	Matthieu Osch	Luxembourg	1:26.25	45	1:26.25	30	2:52.50	+15.25
32	51	Hong Dong-kwan	South Korea	1:26.16	44	1:26.71	31	2:52.87	+15.62
33	73	Casper Dyrbye Næsted	Denmark	1:26.60	46	1:27.75	33	2:54.35	+17.10
34	76	Erjon Tola	Albania	1:27.71	48	1:31.56	36	2:59.27	+22.02
35	86	Richardson Viano	Haiti	1:29.48	50	1:31.00	34	3:00.48	+23.23
36	85	Viktor Petkov	North Macedonia	1:30.27	51	1:31.32	35	3:01.59	+24.34
37	90	Albin Tahiri	Kosovo	1:30.81	52	1:32.35	37	3:03.16	+25.91
38	83	Alexandru Stefanescu	Romania	1:31.42	54	1:33.34	38	3:04.76	+27.51
39	91	Demetrios Maxim	Cyprus	1:36.34	57	1:37.39	40	3:13.73	+36.48
40	94	Ricardo Brancal	Portugal	1:38.46	58	1:36.86	39	3:15.32	+38.07
41	87	Pouria Saveh Shemshaki	Iran	1:35.78	55	1:40.73	41	3:16.51	+39.26
42	92	Naim Fenianos	Lebanon	1:35.96	56	1:42.29	42	3:18.25	+41.00
43	93	Matteo Gatti	San Marino	1:40.80	59	1:46.16	43	3:26.96	+49.71
44	96	Yohan Goutt Gonçalves	Timor-Leste	1:46.81	60	1:49.84	44	3:36.65	+59.40
45	100	Arif Khan	India	1:50.03	61	did not qualify			
46	97	Tang Calcy Ning-chien	Chinese Taipei	1:59.18	62	did not qualify			
	4	Alexis Pinturault	France	1:17.55	1	did not finish			
	10	Alexander Schmid	Germany	1:18.11	3	did not finish			
	22	Stefan Brennsteiner	Austria	1:19.37	7	did not finish			
	18	Thibaut Favrot	France	1:19.70	12	did not finish			
	29	Mattias Rönngren	Sweden	1:20.20	17	did not finish			
	25	Fabian Wilkens Solheim	Norway	1:20.28	18	did not finish			
	21	Giovanni Borsotti	Italy	1:20.33	19	did not finish			
	54	Michel Macedo	Brazil	1:23.25	32	did not finish			
	53	Samuel Kolega	Croatia	1:23.85	34	did not finish			
	56	Kamen Zlatkov	Bulgaria	1:25.36	40	did not finish			
	77	Kalin Zlatkov	Bulgaria	1:25.47	41	did not finish			
	75	Konstantin Stoilov	Bulgaria	1:25.64	42	did not finish			
	71	Filip Baláž	Slovakia	1:25.86	43	did not finish			
	70	Juan Pablo Vallecillo	Argentina	1:27.11	47	did not finish			
	78	Ioannis Antoniou	Greece	1:28.09	49	did not finish			
	84	Michael Poettoz	Colombia	1:30.91	53	did not finish			
	1	Marco Odermatt	Switzerland	did not finish					
	11	Justin Murisier	Switzerland	did not finish					
	14	Gino Caviezel	Switzerland	did not finish					
	15	Erik Read	Canada	did not finish					
	17	Manuel Feller	Austria	did not finish					
	23	Trevor Philp	Canada	did not finish					
	27	Aleksandr Andrienko	Russian Ski Federation	did not finish					
	31	Ivan Kuznetsov	Russian Ski Federation	did not finish					
	32	Maarten Meiners	Netherlands	did not finish					
	32	William Hansson	Sweden	did not finish					
	38	Charlie Raposo	Great Britain	did not finish					
	39	Brodie Seger	Canada	did not finish					
	41	Dries Van den Broecke	Belgium	did not finish					
	43	Joan Verdú	Andorra	did not finish					
	44	Jan Zabystřan	Czech Republic	did not finish					
	46	Nikita Kazazaev	Russian Ski Federation	did not finish					
	47	Alec Scott	Ireland	did not finish					
	48	Nikita Alekhin	Russian Ski Federation	did not finish					
	49	Ian Gut	Liechtenstein	did not finish					
	50	James Crawford	Canada	did not finish					
	55	Ondřej Berndt	Czech Republic	did not finish					
	57	Tomás Birkner de Miguel	Argentina	did not finish					
	59	Simon Breitfuss Kammerlander	Bolivia	did not finish					
	60	Sven Von Appen	Chile	did not finish					
	63	Hugh McAdam	Australia	did not finish					
	64	Juhan Luik	Estonia	did not finish					
	65	Itamar Biran	Israel	did not finish					
	67	Bálint Úry	Hungary	did not finish					
	68	Miks Zvejnieks	Latvia	did not finish					
	72	Strahinja Stanišić	Serbia	did not finish					
	80	Levko Tsibelenko	Ukraine	did not finish					
	81	Sturla Snær Snorrason	Iceland	did not finish					
	82	Eldar Salihović	Montenegro	did not finish					
	88	Soso Japharidze	Georgia	did not finish					
	89	Ashot Karapetyan	Armenia	did not finish					
	95	Yassine Aouich	Morocco	did not finish					
	98	Saphal-Ram Shrestha	Nepal	did not finish					
	99	Hubertus Von Hohenlohe	Mexico	did not finish					

=== Qualification ===
The first run was started on 18 February at 10:00, and the second run at 13:30.

Rank	Bib	Name	Nation	Run 1	Rank	Run 2	Rank	Total	Diff	Notes
1	5	James Crawford	Canada	1:07.96	1	1:02.86	1	2:10.82		Q
2	9	Samuel Kolega	Croatia	1:08.21	2	1:03.80	8	2:12.01	+1.19	Q
3	16	Tiziano Gravier	Argentina	1:08.38	3	1:03.75	7	2:12.13	+1.31	Q
4	12	Albert Popov	Bulgaria	1:08.65	7	1:03.67	6	2:12.32	+1.50	Q
5	17	Hugh McAdam	Australia	1:08.83	9	1:03.51	3	2:12.34	+1.52	Q
6	1	Kamen Zlatkov	Bulgaria	1:08.75	8	1:03.61	4	2:12.36	+1.54	Q
7	15	Cristian Javier Simari Birkner	Argentina	1:08.50	4	1:03.87	10	2:12.37	+1.55	Q
8	8	Ondřej Berndt	Czech Republic	1:08.62	5	1:04.31	16	2:12.93	+2.11	Q
9	20	Itamar Biran	Israel	1:09.59	13	1:03.62	5	2:13.21	+2.39	Q
10	28	Filip Baláž	Slovakia	1:10.01	15	1:04.11	13	2:14.12	+3.30	Q
11	6	Tomás Birkner de Miguel	Argentina	1:08.62	5	1:05.57	30	2:14.19	+3.37	Q
12	2	Sven Von Appen	Chile	1:09.06	10	1:05.19	25	2:14.25	+3.43	Q
13	19	Juhan Luik	Estonia	1:10.26	17	1:04.10	12	2:14.36	+3.54	Q
14	27	Juan Pablo Vallecillo	Argentina	1:10.61	21	1:03.80	8	2:14.41	+3.59	Q
15	14	Simon Breitfuss Kammerlander	Bolivia	1:10.99	28	1:03.45	2	2:14.44	+3.62	Q
16	7	Michel Macedo	Brazil	1:10.64	23	1:04.09	11	2:14.73	+3.91	Q
17	51	Sturla Snær Snorrason	Iceland	1:10.69	24	1:04.31	16	2:15.00	+4.18	Q
17	35	Konstantin Stoilov	Bulgaria	1:10.72	25	1:04.28	14	2:15.00	+4.18	Q
19	32	Emir Lokmić	Bosnia and Herzegovina	1:10.47	19	1:04.54	19	2:15.01	+4.19	Q
20	23	Bálint Úry	Hungary	1:09.39	12	1:05.63	32	2:15.02	+4.20	Q
21	4	Barnabás Szőllős	Israel	1:09.98	14	1:05.05	24	2:15.03	+4.21	Q
22	26	Tom Verbeke	Belgium	1:10.46	18	1:04.66	21	2:15.12	+4.30	Q
23	25	Miks Zvejnieks	Latvia	1:10.50	20	1:04.65	20	2:15.15	+4.33	Q
24	38	Kalin Zlatkov	Bulgaria	1:10.81	26	1:04.41	18	2:15.22	+4.40	Q
25	21	Nicolás Pirozzi	Chile	1:11.18	29	1:04.29	15	2:15.47	+4.65	Q
26	3	Hong Dong-kwan	South Korea	1:10.11	16	1:05.48	26	2:15.59	+4.77	q
27	10	Tormis Laine	Estonia	1:10.87	27	1:04.98	23	2:15.85	+5.03	
28	22	Marko Šljivić	Bosnia and Herzegovina	1:11.37	30	1:04.93	22	2:16.30	+5.48	
29	33	Kai Horwitz	Chile	1:10.61	21	1:05.74	33	2:16.35	+5.53	
30	29	Strahinja Stanišić	Serbia	1:11.50	32	1:05.52	28	2:17.02	+6.20	q
31	31	Casper Dyrbye Næsted	Denmark	1:11.78	35	1:05.58	31	2:17.36	+6.54	q
32	30	Jack Adams	New Zealand	1:11.81	36	1:05.56	29	2:17.37	+6.55	
32	24	Marcus Vorre	Denmark	1:11.88	38	1:05.49	27	2:17.37	+6.55	
34	47	Márton Kékesi	Hungary	1:11.44	31	1:06.25	36	2:17.69	+6.87	
35	36	Žaks Gedra	Latvia	1:11.84	37	1:06.04	35	2:17.88	+7.06	
36	48	Dávid Valeri	Hungary	1:12.01	39	1:05.93	34	2:17.94	+7.12	
37	45	Matthieu Osch	Luxembourg	1:12.35	40	1:06.46	37	2:18.81	+7.99	q
38	37	Erjon Tola	Albania	1:12.67	43	1:06.79	39	2:19.46	+8.64	q
39	34	Dario Komšić	Croatia	1:12.61	42	1:07.47	42	2:20.08	+9.26	
40	70	Soso Japharidze	Georgia	1:13.40	44	1:06.71	38	2:20.11	+9.29	q
41	42	Tamás Trunk	Hungary	1:13.40	44	1:06.81	40	2:20.21	+9.39	
42	68	Richardson Viano	Haiti	1:13.64	47	1:07.89	44	2:21.53	+10.71	q
43	58	Michael Poettoz	Colombia	1:13.58	46	1:08.03	45	2:21.61	+10.79	q
44	55	Nikolaos Tziovas	Greece	1:14.06	50	1:07.56	43	2:21.62	+10.80	
45	82	Albin Tahiri	Kosovo	1:14.90	53	1:07.31	41	2:22.21	+11.39	q
46	41	Tvrtko Ljutić	Croatia	1:11.64	33	1:10.73	60	2:22.37	+11.55	
47	57	Alexandru Stefanescu	Romania	1:13.84	48	1:08.56	47	2:22.40	+11.58	q
48	62	Kevin Qerimi	Albania	1:14.78	52	1:08.34	46	2:23.12	+12.30	
49	80	Ashot Karapetyan	Armenia	1:15.94	55	1:08.85	48	2:24.79	+13.97	q
50	43	Ivan Kovbasnyuk	Ukraine	1:15.19	54	1:09.62	55	2:24.81	+13.99	
51	81	Harutyun Harutyunyan	Armenia	1:16.22	58	1:09.15	49	2:25.37	+14.55	
52	64	Christian Skov Jensen	Denmark	1:16.06	56	1:09.33	51	2:25.39	+14.57	
53	56	Eldar Salihović	Montenegro	1:14.72	51	1:10.70	59	2:25.42	+14.60	q
54	53	Lauris Opmanis	Latvia	1:16.30	59	1:09.50	54	2:25.80	+14.98	
55	77	Ezio Leonetti	Albania	1:16.53	60	1:09.28	50	2:25.81	+14.99	
56	88	Sandro Zhorzholiani	Georgia	1:16.75	61	1:09.35	52	2:26.10	+15.28	
57	59	Viktor Petkov	North Macedonia	1:17.22	63	1:09.44	53	2:26.66	+15.84	q
58	94	Alberto Tamagnini	San Marino	1:16.87	62	1:09.90	56	2:26.77	+15.95	
59	76	Marcus Christian Riis	Denmark	1:17.78	65	1:10.24	58	2:28.02	+17.20	
60	90	Ricardo Brancal	Portugal	1:17.85	66	1:10.79	61	2:28.64	+17.82	q
61	86	Naim Fenianos	Lebanon	1:18.92	70	1:10.20	57	2:29.12	+18.30	q
62	91	Valentino Caputi	Brazil	1:18.21	67	1:10.94	62	2:29.15	+18.33	
63	89	Matteo Gatti	San Marino	1:18.77	69	1:11.10	63	2:29.87	+19.05	q
64	92	Cesar Arnouk	Lebanon	1:18.32	68	1:12.13	64	2:30.45	+19.63	
65	83	Demetrios Maxim	Cyprus	1:20.20	73	1:13.29	67	2:33.49	+22.67	q
66	113	Nodar Kozanashvili	Georgia	1:20.69	74	1:12.92	65	2:33.61	+22.79	
67	96	Vladimir Vukmirović	Montenegro	1:20.82	75	1:12.98	66	2:33.80	+22.98	
68	93	Mackenson Florindo	Haiti	1:21.32	76	1:14.92	70	2:36.24	+25.42	
69	73	Behnam Kia Shemshaki	Iran	1:21.39	78	1:14.87	69	2:36.26	+25.44	
70	98	Cyril Kayrouz	Lebanon	1:22.41	80	1:14.07	68	2:36.48	+25.66	
71	102	Borjan Strezoski	North Macedonia	1:26.39	81	1:17.77	71	2:44.16	+33.34	
72	101	Yohan Goutt Gonçalves	Timor-Leste	1:26.98	83	1:20.36	72	2:47.34	+36.52	q
73	106	Mahdi Idhya	Morocco	1:28.08	84	1:22.67	73	2:50.75	+39.93	
74	111	Arif Khan	India	1:29.16	85	1:23.35	75	2:52.51	+41.69	q
75	110	Hubertus Von Hohenlohe	Mexico	1:30.78	86	1:23.03	74	2:53.81	+42.99	q
76	97	Yassine Aouich	Morocco	1:35.36	88	1:23.60	76	2:58.96	+48.14	q
77	103	Tang Calcy Ning-chien	Chinese Taipei	1:33.06	87	1:34.41	77	3:07.47	+56.65	q
78	112	Jean-Pierre Roy	Haiti	2:08.34	90	2:04.06	78	4:12.40	+2:01.58	
	13	Rok Ažnoh	Slovenia	1:09.24	11	did not finish				
	18	Benjamin Szőllős	Israel	1:11.76	34	did not finish				
	40	Ioannis Antoniou	Greece	1:12.52	41	did not finish				q
	61	Tobias Hansen	Iceland	1:14.00	49	did not finish				
	65	Mateja Minić	Serbia	1:17.54	64	did not finish				
	67	Emmanouil Zografos-Manos	Greece	1:21.37	77	did not finish				
	69	Pouria Saveh Shemshaki	Iran	1:20.13	72	did not finish				q
	72	Nima Baha	Iran	1:26.57	82	did not finish				
	74	Georg Fannar Þórðarson	Iceland	1:16.06	56	did not finish				
	78	Christos Marmarellis	Greece	1:19.87	71	did not finish				
	104	Ray Iskandar	Lebanon	1:22.29	79	did not finish				
	107	Hayk Geghamyan	Armenia	1:35.99	89	did not finish				
	11	Andrés Figueroa	Chile	did not finish						
	39	Elvis Opmanis	Latvia	did not finish						
	44	Cormac Comerford	Ireland	did not finish						
	46	Mihajlo Đorđević	Serbia	did not finish						
	49	Dino Terzić	Bosnia and Herzegovina	did not finish						
	52	Rastko Blagojević	Serbia	did not finish						
	54	Bjarki Guðmundsson	Iceland	did not finish						
	63	Harun Kunovac	Bosnia and Herzegovina	did not finish						
	71	Seyed Morteza Jafari	Iran	did not finish						
	75	Mirko Lazareski	North Macedonia	did not finish						
	79	Baptiste Aranjo	Portugal	did not finish						
	84	Christopher Holm	Brazil	did not finish						
	85	Besarion Japaridze	Georgia	did not finish						
	87	Arbi Pupovci	Kosovo	did not finish						
	95	Bojan Kosić	Montenegro	did not finish						
	99	Andreas Epiphaniou	Cyprus	did not finish						
	100	Vakaris Jokūbas Lapienis	Lithuania	did not finish						
	105	Vladimir Petkov	North Macedonia	did not finish						
	108	Saphal-Ram Shrestha	Nepal	did not finish						q
	109	Vasil Veriga	Albania	did not finish						
	50	Levko Tsibelenko	Ukraine	disqualified						q
	60	Maksym Mariichyn	Ukraine	did not start						
	66	Mykhailo Karpushyn	Ukraine	did not start						
