= FIS Alpine World Ski Championships 2017 – Men's slalom =

Men's slalom at the FIS Alpine World Ski Championships 2017
- Venue: Piz Nair
- Location: St. Moritz, Switzerland
- Dates: 19 February
- Competitors: 100 from 54 nations
- Winning time: 1:34.75

Medalists
| gold medal | Marcel Hirscher | Austria |
| silver medal | Manuel Feller | Austria |
| bronze medal | Felix Neureuther | Germany |

The Men's slalom competition at the 2017 World Championships was held on 19 February 2017.

A qualification was held on 18 February 2017.

== Results ==
The first run was started at 09:45 and the second run at 13:00.

| Rank | Bib | Name | Nation | Run 1 | Rank | Run 2 | Rank | Total | Diff |
|---|---|---|---|---|---|---|---|---|---|
| 1st place, gold medalist(s) | 6 | Marcel Hirscher | Austria | 46.43 | 1 | 48.32 | 3 | 1:34.75 | |
| 2nd place, silver medalist(s) | 8 | Manuel Feller | Austria | 47.10 | 7 | 48.33 | 4 | 1:35.43 | +0.68 |
| 3rd place, bronze medalist(s) | 2 | Felix Neureuther | Germany | 47.19 | 10 | 48.49 | 5 | 1:35.68 | +0.93 |
| 4 | 3 | Henrik Kristoffersen | Norway | 47.08 | 6 | 48.71 | 12 | 1:35.79 | +1.04 |
| 5 | 7 | Aleksandr Khoroshilov | Russia | 47.11 | 8 | 48.69 | 11 | 1:35.80 | +1.05 |
| 6 | 14 | André Myhrer | Sweden | 47.55 | 15 | 48.30 | 2 | 1:35.85 | +1.10 |
| 7 | 10 | Marco Schwarz | Austria | 46.86 | 2 | 49.00 | 17 | 1:35.86 | +1.11 |
| 8 | 12 | Michael Matt | Austria | 46.91 | 3 | 49.08 | 19 | 1:35.99 | +1.24 |
| 9 | 11 | Stefano Gross | Italy | 47.40 | 14 | 48.75 | 14 | 1:36.15 | +1.40 |
| 10 | 40 | Štefan Hadalin | Slovenia | 47.93 | 22 | 48.23 | 1 | 1:36.16 | +1.41 |
| 11 | 5 | Dave Ryding | Great Britain | 46.96 | 4 | 49.22 | 22 | 1:36.18 | +1.43 |
| 12 | 25 | David Chodounsky | United States | 47.72 | 20 | 48.52 | 6 | 1:36.24 | +1.49 |
| 13 | 17 | Jonathan Nordbotten | Norway | 47.55 | 15 | 48.71 | 12 | 1:36.26 | +1.51 |
| 14 | 1 | Manfred Mölgg | Italy | 47.64 | 17 | 48.66 | 8 | 1:36.30 | +1.55 |
| 15 | 21 | Leif Kristian Haugen | Norway | 47.67 | 19 | 48.68 | 10 | 1:36.35 | +1.60 |
| 16 | 37 | Reto Schmidiger | Switzerland | 47.75 | 21 | 48.63 | 7 | 1:36.38 | +1.63 |
| 17 | 26 | Victor Muffat-Jeandet | France | 47.37 | 12 | 49.07 | 18 | 1:36.44 | +1.69 |
| 18 | 29 | Robin Buffet | France | 47.65 | 18 | 49.10 | 20 | 1:36.75 | +2.00 |
| 19 | 22 | Luca Aerni | Switzerland | 48.32 | 26 | 48.67 | 9 | 1:36.99 | +2.24 |
| 20 | 27 | Linus Strasser | Germany | 48.25 | 25 | 48.96 | 16 | 1:37.21 | +2.46 |
| 21 | 38 | Dominik Stehle | Germany | 48.01 | 23 | 49.21 | 21 | 1:37.22 | +2.47 |
| 22 | 24 | Giuliano Razzoli | Italy | 48.37 | 27 | 48.89 | 15 | 1:37.26 | +2.51 |
| 23 | 18 | Jean-Baptiste Grange | France | 48.23 | 24 | 49.57 | 23 | 1:37.80 | +3.05 |
| 24 | 19 | Patrick Thaler | Italy | 48.92 | 33 | 49.57 | 23 | 1:38.49 | +3.74 |
| 25 | 47 | Joaquim Salarich | Spain | 48.82 | 30 | 49.68 | 25 | 1:38.50 | +3.75 |
| 26 | 49 | Marco Pfiffner | Liechtenstein | 48.66 | 28 | 50.21 | 28 | 1:38.87 | +4.12 |
| 27 | 46 | Albert Popov | Bulgaria | 48.86 | 31 | 50.22 | 29 | 1:39.08 | +4.33 |
| 28 | 30 | Stefan Luitz | Germany | 48.95 | 34 | 50.20 | 27 | 1:39.15 | +4.40 |
| 29 | 55 | Aleksandr Andrienko | Russia | 49.29 | 42 | 50.09 | 26 | 1:39.38 | +4.63 |
| 30 | 39 | Istok Rodeš | Croatia | 49.28 | 41 | 50.35 | 30 | 1:39.63 | +4.88 |
| 31 | 53 | Joonas Räsänen | Finland | 49.32 | 43 | 50.42 | 31 | 1:39.74 | +4.99 |
| 32 | 45 | Kristaps Zvejnieks | Latvia | 48.96 | 35 | 50.91 | 34 | 1:39.87 | +5.12 |
| 33 | 69 | Laurie Taylor | Great Britain | 49.09 | 38 | 50.90 | 32 | 1:39.99 | +5.24 |
| 34 | 32 | Mark Engel | United States | 49.05 | 37 | 51.04 | 36 | 1:40.09 | +5.34 |
| 35 | 31 | Matej Vidović | Croatia | 49.26 | 40 | 50.90 | 32 | 1:40.16 | +5.41 |
| 36 | 58 | Kamen Zlatkov | Bulgaria | 49.73 | 45 | 51.02 | 35 | 1:40.75 | +6.00 |
| 37 | 52 | Gustav Lundbäck | Sweden | 51.22 | 51 | 51.43 | 37 | 1:42.65 | +7.90 |
| 38 | 54 | Ivica Kostelić | Croatia | 49.93 | 46 | 52.77 | 39 | 1:42.70 | +7.95 |
| 39 | 35 | Robby Kelley | United States | 49.25 | 39 | 53.78 | 43 | 1:43.03 | +8.28 |
| 40 | 81 | Iason Abramashvili | Georgia | 50.74 | 50 | 52.76 | 38 | 1:43.50 | +8.75 |
| 41 | 56 | Kai Alaerts | Belgium | 50.19 | 48 | 53.32 | 41 | 1:43.51 | +8.76 |
| 42 | 64 | Steffan Winkelhorst | Netherlands | 48.76 | 29 | 54.93 | 45 | 1:43.69 | +8.94 |
| 43 | 79 | Strahinja Stanišić | Serbia | 51.27 | 52 | 53.40 | 42 | 1:44.67 | +9.92 |
| 44 | 73 | Martin Anguita | Chile | 51.30 | 54 | 53.83 | 44 | 1:45.13 | +10.38 |
| 45 | 82 | Márton Kékesi | Hungary | 52.63 | 57 | 52.83 | 40 | 1:45.46 | +10.71 |
| 46 | 85 | Casper Dyrbye Næsted | Denmark | 52.17 | 56 | 55.07 | 46 | 1:47.24 | +12.49 |
| 47 | 95 | Ivan Kovbasnyuk | Ukraine | 53.00 | 59 | 55.67 | 47 | 1:48.67 | +13.92 |
| — | 4 | Daniel Yule | Switzerland | 47.33 | 11 | DNF | | | |
| — | 15 | Mattias Hargin | Sweden | 47.00 | 5 | DNF | | | |
| — | 23 | Ramon Zenhäusern | Switzerland | 47.12 | 9 | DNF | | | |
| — | 33 | Pavel Trikhichev | Russia | 48.90 | 32 | DNF | | | |
| — | 62 | Cristian Javier Simari Birkner | Argentina | 49.35 | 44 | DNF | | | |
| — | 63 | Andreas Žampa | Slovakia | 50.49 | 49 | DNF | | | |
| — | 68 | Dries Van den Broecke | Belgium | 49.98 | 47 | DNF | | | |
| — | 71 | Patrick Brachner | Azerbaijan | 51.27 | 52 | DNF | | | |
| — | 77 | Ioannis Proios | Greece | 51.45 | 55 | DNF | | | |
| — | 83 | Marko Stevović | Serbia | 53.10 | 60 | DNF | | | |
| — | 92 | Jeremy Denat | Peru | 52.89 | 58 | DNF | | | |
| — | 13 | Julien Lizeroux | France | 47.39 | 13 | DSQ | | | |
| — | 48 | Žan Kranjec | Slovenia | 48.98 | 36 | DNS | | | |
| — | 91 | Rokas Zaveckas | Lithuania | 53.20 | 61 | DNQ | | | |
| — | 90 | Cormac Comerford | Ireland | 54.05 | 62 | DNQ | | | |
| — | 93 | Erjon Tola | Albania | 54.38 | 63 | DNQ | | | |
| — | 97 | Albin Tahiri | KOS | 56.65 | 64 | DNQ | | | |
| — | 94 | Nima Baha | Iran | 57.21 | 65 | DNQ | | | |
| — | 96 | Michael Poettoz | Colombia | 59.49 | 66 | DNQ | | | |
| — | 98 | Sive Speelman | South Africa | 1:01.05 | 67 | DNQ | | | |
| — | 99 | Naim Fenianos | Lebanon | 1:04.70 | 68 | DNQ | | | |
| — | 9 | Alexis Pinturault | France | DNF | | | | | |
| — | 16 | Naoki Yuasa | Japan | DNF | | | | | |
| — | 20 | Sebastian Foss Solevåg | Norway | DNF | | | | | |
| — | 28 | Erik Read | Canada | DNF | | | | | |
| — | 36 | Trevor Philp | Canada | DNF | | | | | |
| — | 41 | Phil Brown | Canada | DNF | | | | | |
| — | 42 | Michael Ankeny | United States | DNF | | | | | |
| — | 43 | Kristoffer Jakobsen | Sweden | DNF | | | | | |
| — | 44 | Žan Grošelj | Slovenia | DNF | | | | | |
| — | 50 | Jakob Špik | Slovenia | DNF | | | | | |
| — | 51 | Dalibor Šamšal | Hungary | DNF | | | | | |
| — | 57 | Michał Jasiczek | Poland | DNF | | | | | |
| — | 59 | Sebastiano Gastaldi | Argentina | DNF | | | | | |
| — | 60 | Juan del Campo | Spain | DNF | | | | | |
| — | 61 | Adam Barwood | New Zealand | DNF | | | | | |
| — | 65 | Willis Feasey | New Zealand | DNF | | | | | |
| — | 66 | Juho Handolin | Finland | DNF | | | | | |
| — | 67 | Axel Esteve | Andorra | DNF | | | | | |
| — | 70 | Tom Verbeke | Belgium | DNF | | | | | |
| — | 72 | Tomas Birkner De Miguel | Argentina | DNF | | | | | |
| — | 74 | Eman Emrić | Bosnia and Herzegovina | DNF | | | | | |
| — | 75 | Jan Zabystřan | Czech Republic | DNF | | | | | |
| — | 76 | Sturla Snær Snorrason | Iceland | DNF | | | | | |
| — | 78 | Antonio Ristevski | Macedonia | DNF | | | | | |
| — | 80 | Alexandru Barbu | Romania | DNF | | | | | |
| — | 84 | Yuri Danilochkin | Belarus | DNF | | | | | |
| — | 86 | Juhan Luik | Estonia | DNF | | | | | |
| — | 87 | Itamar Biran | Israel | DNF | | | | | |
| — | 88 | Arthur Hanse | Portugal | DNF | | | | | |
| — | 89 | Simon Breitfuss Kammerlander | Bolivia | DNF | | | | | |
| — | 34 | Kryštof Krýzl | Czech Republic | DSQ | | | | | |
| — | 100 | Hubertus von Hohenlohe | Mexico | DSQ | | | | | |
