= FIS Alpine World Ski Championships 2015 – Men's slalom =

Men's slalom at the FIS Alpine World Ski Championships 2015
- Venue: Birds of Prey; Beaver Creek, Colorado, U.S.
- Date: February 15, 2015
- Competitors: 100 from 57 nations

Medalists
gold medal	Jean-Baptiste Grange	France
silver medal	Fritz Dopfer	Germany
bronze medal	Felix Neureuther	Germany

The Men's slalom competition at the 2015 World Championships was held on Sunday, February 15. It was the final event of the championships.

A qualification was held a day earlier.

== Results ==
The first run was started at 10:15 and the second run at 14:30.

Rank	Bib	Name	Nation	Run 1	Rank	Run 2	Rank	Total	Diff
1st place, gold medalist(s)	14	Jean-Baptiste Grange	France	1:04.26	5	53.21	1	1:57.47	
2nd place, silver medalist(s)	4	Fritz Dopfer	Germany	1:04.31	6	53.51	4	1:57.82	+0.35
3rd place, bronze medalist(s)	7	Felix Neureuther	Germany	1:04.47	7	53.55	5	1:58.02	+0.55
4	3	Henrik Kristoffersen	Norway	1:04.64	9	53.40	3	1:58.04	+0.57
5	2	Mattias Hargin	Sweden	1:04.23	4	53.86	6	1:58.09	+0.62
6	15	Andre Myhrer	Sweden	1:04.04	3	54.17	8	1:58.21	+0.74
7	9	Markus Larsson	Sweden	1:05.15	13	53.32	2	1:58.47	+1.00
8	6	Alexander Khoroshilov	Russia	1:03.66	2	55.28	22	1:58.94	+1.47
9	12	Sebastian Foss Solevåg	Norway	1:05.61	17	54.17	8	1:59.78	+2.31
10	23	Linus Strasser	Germany	1:05.67	18	54.18	10	1:59.85	+2.38
11	21	Manfred Mölgg	Italy	1:05.13	12	54.87	17	2:00.00	+2.53
12	24	Reinfried Herbst	Austria	1:05.89	19	54.51	14	2:00.40	+2.93
13	44	Justin Murisier	Switzerland	1:06.21	21	54.60	15	2:00.81	+3.34
13	41	Filip Zubčić	Croatia	1:06.37	24	54.44	12	2:00.81	+3.34
15	26	Ivica Kostelić	Croatia	1:06.38	25	54.49	13	2:00.87	+3.40
16	35	Espen Lysdahl	Norway	1:06.62	26	54.26	11	2:00.88	+3.41
17	36	Philipp Schmid	Germany	1:06.35	22	54.62	16	2:00.97	+3.50
18	38	Trevor Philp	Canada	1:06.05	20	54.97	18	2:01.02	+3.55
19	30	Adam Žampa	Slovakia	1:05.39	16	55.72	24	2:01.11	+3.64
20	37	Matic Skube	Slovenia	1:07.15	28	54.08	7	2:01.23	+3.76
21	17	Ted Ligety	United States	1:05.31	15	56.00	27	2:01.31	+3.84
22	19	Julien Lizeroux	France	1:06.36	23	55.07	20	2:01.43	+3.96
23	34	Tim Kelley	United States	1:07.16	29	55.28	22	2:02.44	+4.97
24	43	Erik Read	Canada	1:07.65	33	54.97	18	2:02.62	+5.15
25	33	Jung Dong-hyun	South Korea	1:07.56	32	55.13	21	2:02.69	+5.22
26	48	Matej Vidović	Croatia	1:07.31	30	55.93	25	2:03.24	+5.77
27	50	Natko Zrnčić-Dim	Croatia	1:07.88	34	56.48	29	2:04.36	+6.89
28	51	Stefan Prisadov	Bulgaria	1:08.66	37	55.98	26	2:04.64	+7.17
29	56	Andreas Žampa	Slovakia	1:09.04	38	56.28	28	2:05.32	+7.85
30	61	Joaquim Salarich	Spain	1:09.14	39	56.50	30	2:05.64	+8.17
31	53	Cristian Javier Simari Birkner	Argentina	1:08.57	36	57.67	33	2:06.24	+8.77
32	55	Žan Kranjec	Slovenia	1:10.08	42	56.72	31	2:06.80	+9.33
33	65	Kyung Sung-hyun	South Korea	1:09.78	41	58.31	34	2:08.09	+10.62
34	76	Eugenio Claro	Chile	1:09.59	40	58.91	35	2:08.50	+11.03
35	62	Tomas Birkner De Miguel	Argentina	1:11.87	45	57.26	32	2:09.13	+11.66
36	80	Casper Dyrbye	Denmark	1:12.95	46	1:02.69	37	2:15.64	+18.17
37	81	Ivan Kovbasnyuk	Ukraine	1:15.74	48	1:02.23	36	2:17.97	+20.50
38	83	Rokas Zaveckas	Lithuania	1:15.59	47	1:03.57	39	2:19.16	+21.69
39	89	Michel Macedo	Brazil	1:18.15	49	1:02.73	38	2:20.88	+23.41
40	97	Alexander Heath	South Africa	1:19.77	51	1:05.12	40	2:24.89	+27.42
41	84	Conor Lyne	Ireland	1:21.75	53	1:05.15	41	2:26.90	+29.43
42	88	Geoffrey Osch	Luxembourg	1:21.68	52	1:09.93	43	2:31.61	+34.14
43	87	Evgeniy Timofeev	Kyrgyzstan	1:28.50	54	1:09.12	42	2:37.62	+40.15
44	95	Yohan Goutt Gonçalves	Timor-Leste	1:29.27	55	1:17.20	44	2:46.47	+49.00
45	92	Bojan Kosić	Montenegro	1:30.52	56	1:17.25	45	2:47.77	+50.30
46	98	Hubertus von Hohenlohe	Mexico	1:36.39	57	1:19.17	46	2:55.56	+58.09
	1	Marcel Hirscher	Austria	1:03.38	1	DNF			
	10	Alexis Pinturault	France	1:04.50	8	DNF			
	13	Jens Byggmark	Sweden	1:04.93	10	DNF			
	5	Stefano Gross	Italy	1:04.95	11	DNF			
	11	Patrick Thaler	Italy	1:05.27	14	DNF			
	49	Michael Matt	Austria	1:06.73	27	DNF			
	47	Kristaps Zvejnieks	Latvia	1:07.97	35	DNF			
	40	Dalibor Šamšal	Hungary	1:07.54	31	DNF			
	70	Sebastiano Gastaldi	Argentina	1:10.15	43	DNF			
	72	Warren Cummings Smith	Estonia	1:11.81	44	DNF			
	16	Victor Muffat-Jeandet	France	1:19.58	50	DNS			
	8	Giuliano Razzoli	Italy	DNF					
	18	Mario Matt	Austria	DNF					
	20	Daniel Yule	Switzerland	DNF					
	22	Benjamin Raich	Austria	DNF					
	25	David Chodounsky	United States	DNF					
	27	Luca Aerni	Switzerland	DNF					
	28	Naoki Yuasa	Japan	DNF					
	29	David Ryding	Great Britain	DNF					
	31	Jonathan Nortdbotten	Norway	DNF					
	32	Will Brandenburg	United States	DNF					
	39	Phil Brown	Canada	DNF					
	42	Pavel Trikhichev	Russia	DNF					
	45	Kryštof Krýzl	Czech Republic	DNF					
	46	Joonas Räsänen	Finland	DNF					
	52	Albert Popov	Bulgaria	DNF					
	54	Kai Alaerts	Belgium	DNF					
	57	Aleksander Andrienko	Russia	DNF					
	58	Martin Vráblík	Czech Republic	DNF					
	59	Adam Barwood	New Zealand	DNF					
	60	Einar Kristgeirsson	Iceland	DNF					
	63	Marko Rudić	Bosnia and Herzegovina	DNF					
	64	Ross Peraudo	Australia	DNF					
	66	Maciej Bydliński	Poland	DNF					
	67	Antonio Ristevski	Macedonia	DNF					
	68	Mike Rishworth	Australia	DNF					
	69	Igor Laikert	Bosnia and Herzegovina	DNF					
	71	Armand Marchant	Belgium	DNF					
	73	Miks Zvejnieks	Latvia	DNF					
	74	Park Hy-uk	South Korea	DNF					
	75	Ioannis Antoniou	Greece	DNF					
	77	Andrija Vuković	Serbia	DNF					
	78	Nikoloz Kozanashvili	Georgia	DNF					
	79	Maarten Meiners	Netherlands	DNF					
	82	Erjon Tola	Albania	DNF					
	85	Zhou Dongjun	China	DNF					
	86	Manfred Oettl Reyes	Peru	DNF					
	90	Igor Zakurdaev	Kazakhstan	DNF					
	91	Kamiljon Tukhtaev	Uzbekistan	DNF					
	93	Alexandre Mohbat	Lebanon	DNF					
	94	Itamar Biran	Israel	DNF					
	96	Arif Khan	India	DNF					
	99	Pieris Pieri	Cyprus	DNF					
	100	Alessandro Mariotti	San Marino	DNF					
