= Daniel Yule =

Swiss alpine skier (born 1993)

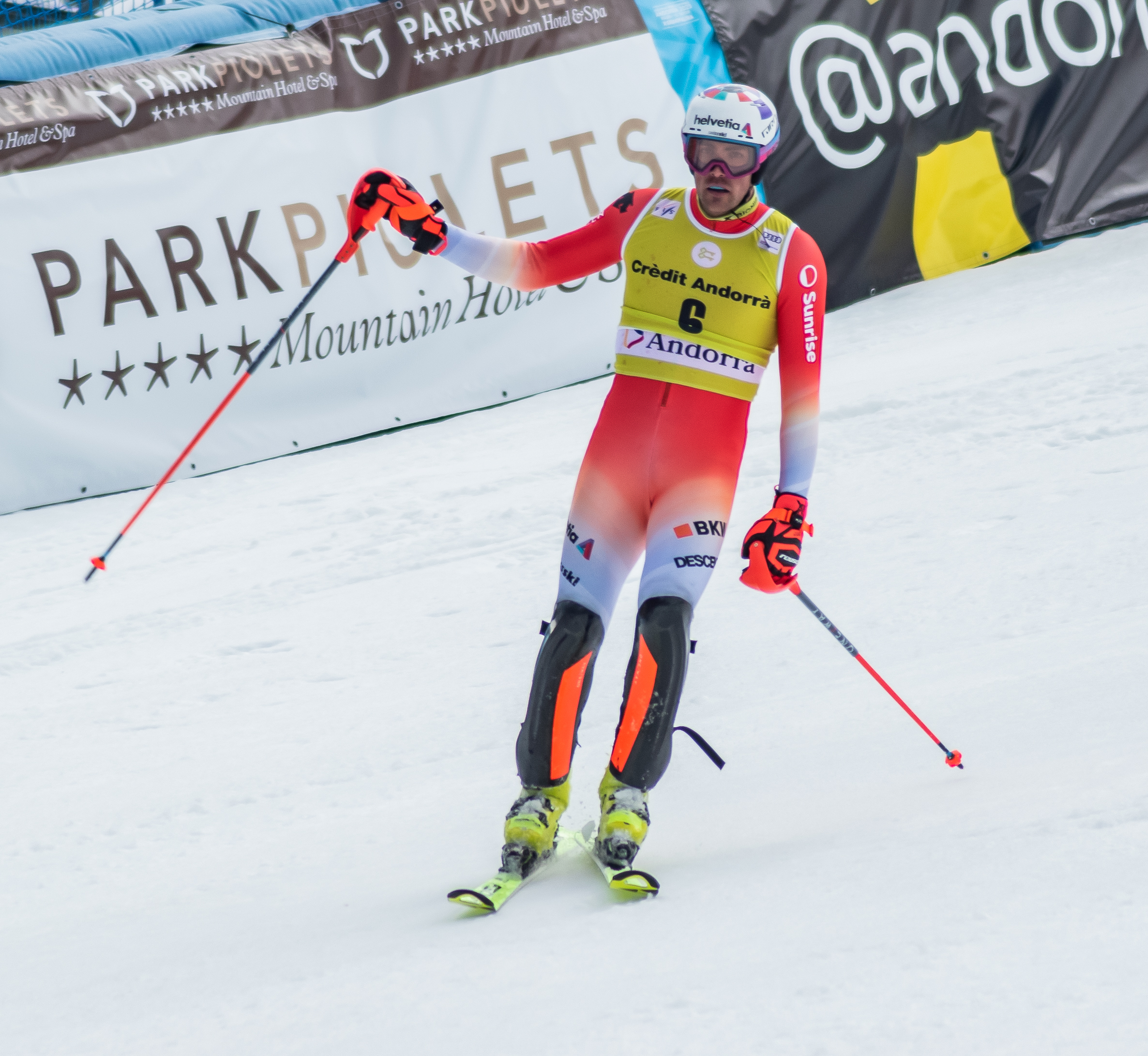
- Yule in 2023

Personal information
- Born: 18 February 1993 (age 33) Martigny, Valais, Switzerland
- Height: 1.87 m (6 ft 2 in)
- Website: danielyule.com

Skiing career
- Country: Switzerland
- Sport: Alpine skiing
- Club: Champex-Ferret
- Disciplines: Slalom
- World Cup debut: 22 January 2012 (age 18)

Olympics
- Teams: 4 – (2014–2026)
- Medals: 1 (1 gold)

World Championships
- Teams: 6 – (2015–2025)
- Medals: 1 (1 gold)

World Cup
- Seasons: 15 – (2012–2026)
- Wins: 7 – (7 SL)
- Podiums: 17 – (17 SL)
- Overall titles: 0 – (11th in 2019)
- Discipline titles: 0 – (2nd in SL, 2019)
Medal record
Men's alpine skiing
Representing Switzerland
World Cup race podiums: Event / 1st / 2nd / 3rd; Slalom / 7 / 1 / 7
Olympic Games
Gold medal – first place	2018 Pyeongchang	Team event
World Championships
Gold medal – first place	2019 Åre	Team event
Junior World Ski Championships
Bronze medal – third place	2014 Jasná	Slalom

Daniel Yule (born 18 February 1993) is a Swiss World Cup alpine ski racer and specializes in slalom. Born in Martigny, Valais, he is of Scottish parentage.

== Racing career ==
Yule rose quickly to make his World Cup debut in the 2012 season in Kitzbühel at the age of 18, he had achieved his first points at the European Cup level just a month earlier. Having had a year of solid results in the European Cup in 2013, he became a World Cup regular for the 2014 season.

=== 2014 ===
After earning his first European Cup victory in the early 2014 season, Yule achieved his first World Cup points in the third slalom of the year, a race that was moved to Bormio, where he took 17 place. The breakthrough result came on the same piste on which he had made his World Cup debut. With a start number of 41, Yule finished 30th after the first run, meaning he was the last person to qualify for a second. In that second run, Yule took 4 tenths of a second out of the rest of the field, which catapulted him up the order to eventual 7th position. This result was enough to earn him a place on the Swiss Olympic Team in Sochi, where he competed in the slalom. Twelfth after the first run, Yule was disqualified in the second. After the Olympics, Yule went to his first Junior World Championships, where he earned a Bronze Medal in the slalom.

=== 2015 ===
The 2015 season was to be the first which Yule concentrated on the World Cup, although Yule did claim back-to-back victories in the two European Cup slaloms in Chamonix. He was able to find consistency in his skiing at the World Cup level, achieving points in 7 of the first 8 races of the season. Yule finished tenth three times; in Levi, Zagreb, and Schladming. and with those results, he fulfilled the selection criteria for the World Championships. His run in the slalom at the Championships ended very quickly, as he skied out of the course after only three gates. Yule's season results were enough to qualify for the World Cup Finals for the first time, and he finished the slalom tour in 16th as highest ranked Swiss in the discipline.

=== 2016 ===
Yule began the year promisingly with a ninth place in the first slalom of the season in Val-d'Isère after the season opener in Levi was cancelled.

=== 2018 ===
During the 2018 season, Yule took his first World Cup podium finishes, taking third at both Kitzbühel and Schladming.

=== 2019 ===
Yule started his 2019 season with a fifth place in Levi and a sixth in Saalbach-Hinterglemm. He earned his first win on the World Cup circuit in the Madonna di Campiglio night slalom after finishing fourth in the first run. He benefited from both Marcel Hirscher and Henrik Kristoffersen straddling. Yule's victory was the first World Cup slalom win for a Swiss male skier since Marc Gini's first place in Reiteralm in November 2007.

=== 2024 ===
In a groundbreaking moment at the World Cup, Daniel Yule achieved a historic victory in the slalom event held in Chamonix. This remarkable triumph marked the first time in World Cup history that an athlete, initially ranking 30th after the initial run, secured a victory in such a competition. Yule's accomplishment marked a significant milestone, surpassing the prior achievement of Lucas Braathen, who had managed to secure victory in the Wengen slalom event in 2022 after beginning the race from the 29th position following the initial run.

== World Cup results ==
=== Season standings ===
Season
Season	Age	Overall	Slalom	Giant slalom	Super-G	Downhill	Combined	Parallel
2014	21	88	30	—	—	—	—	—N/a
2015	22	51	16	—	—	—	—	—N/a
2016	23	50	13	—	—	—	—	—N/a
2017	24	31	21	16	—	—	—	—N/a
2018	25	22	5	—	—	—	—	—N/a
2019	26	11	2nd place, silver medalist(s)	—	—	—	—	—N/a
2020	27	13	3rd place, bronze medalist(s)	—	—	—	—	—
2021	28	50	16	55	—	—	—N/a	—
2022	29	24	6	—	—	—	—N/a	—
2023	30	17	4	—	—	—	—N/a	—N/a
2024	31	29	7	—	—	—	—N/a	—N/a
2025	32	42	14	—	—	—	—N/a	—N/a
2026	33	57	20	—	—	—	—N/a	—N/a

=== Race podiums ===
- 7 wins – (7 SL)
- 17 podiums – (17 SL)

Season
Season	Date	Location	Discipline	Place
2018	21 January 2018	Kitzbühel, Austria	Slalom	3rd
2018	23 January 2018	Schladming, Austria	Slalom	3rd
2019	22 December 2018	Madonna di Campiglio, Italy	Slalom	1st
2019	29 January 2019	Schladming, Austria	Slalom	3rd
2019	17 March 2019	Soldeu, Andorra	Slalom	3rd
2020	24 November 2019	Levi, Finland	Slalom	3rd
2020	8 January 2020	Madonna di Campiglio, Italy	Slalom	1st
2020	11 January 2020	Adelboden, Switzerland	Slalom	1st
2020	26 January 2020	Kitzbühel, Austria	Slalom	1st
2020	28 January 2020	Schladming, Austria	Slalom	3rd
2022	16 January 2022	Wengen, Switzerland	Slalom	2nd
2022	9 March 2022	Flachau, Austria	Slalom	3rd
2023	22 December 2022	Madonna di Campiglio, Italy	Slalom	1st
2023	22 January 2023	Kitzbühel, Austria	Slalom	1st
2023	4 February 2023	Chamonix, France	Slalom	3rd
2024	21 January 2024	Kitzbühel, Austria	Slalom	3rd
2024	4 February 2024	Chamonix, France	Slalom	1st

== World Championship results ==
Year
Year	Age	Slalom	Giant slalom	Super-G	Downhill	Combined	Team combined	Parallel	Team event
2015	22	DNF1	—	—	—	—	—N/a	—N/a	—
2017	24	DNF2	—	—	—	—	—N/a	—N/a	—
2019	26	DNF1	—	—	—	—	—N/a	—N/a	1
2021	28	5	—	—	—	—	—N/a	—	—
2023	30	24	—	—	—	—	—N/a	—	—
2025	32	DNF2	—	—	—	—N/a	DNF2	—N/a	—

== Olympic results ==
Year
Year	Age	Slalom	Giant slalom	Super-G	Downhill	Combined	Team combined	Team event
2014	21	DSQ2	—	—	—	—	—N/a	—N/a
2018	25	8	—	—	—	—	—N/a	1
2022	29	6	—	—	—	—	—N/a	—
2026	33	15	—	—	—	—N/a	13	—N/a
