= Stefano Gross =

Italian alpine skier (born 1986)

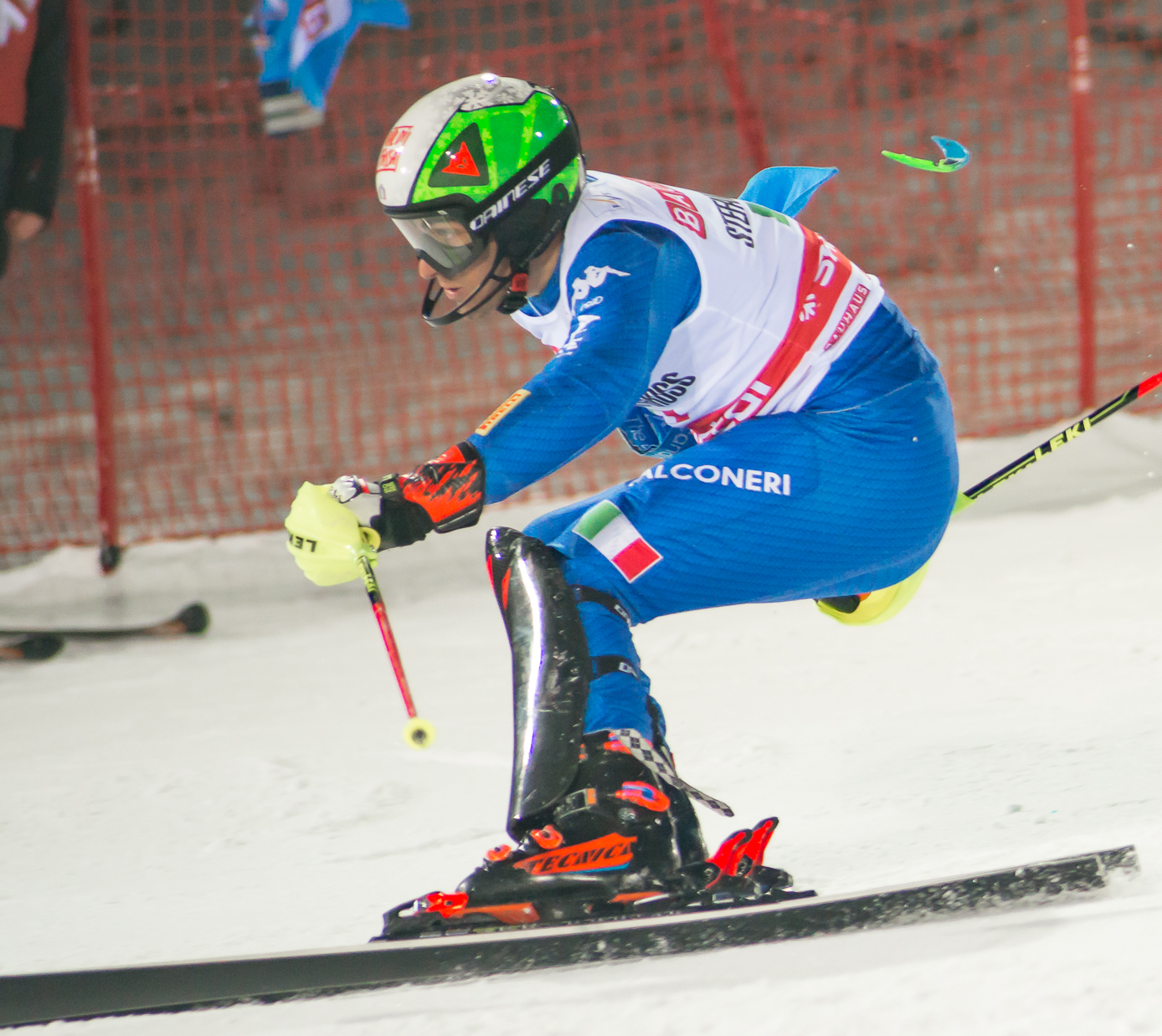
- At Stockholm in 2018

Personal information
- Born: 4 September 1986 (age 39) Bolzano, South Tyrol, Italy
- Height: 1.78 m (5 ft 10 in)
- Website: stefanogross.com

Skiing career
- Country: Italy
- Sport: Alpine skiing
- Club: G.S. Fiamme Gialle
- Disciplines: Slalom
- World Cup debut: 22 December 2008 (age 22)

Olympics
- Teams: 2 – (2014, 2018)
- Medals: 0

World Championships
- Teams: 8 – (2011–2025)
- Medals: 0

World Cup
- Seasons: 17 – (2009–2025)
- Wins: 1 – (1 SL)
- Podiums: 12 – (11 SL, 1 PSL)
- Overall titles: 0 – (16th in 2015)
- Discipline titles: 0 – (5th in SL in 2012)
Medal record
World Military Games
Gold medal – first place	2017 Sochi	Slalom
Gold medal – first place	2017 Sochi	Slalom team

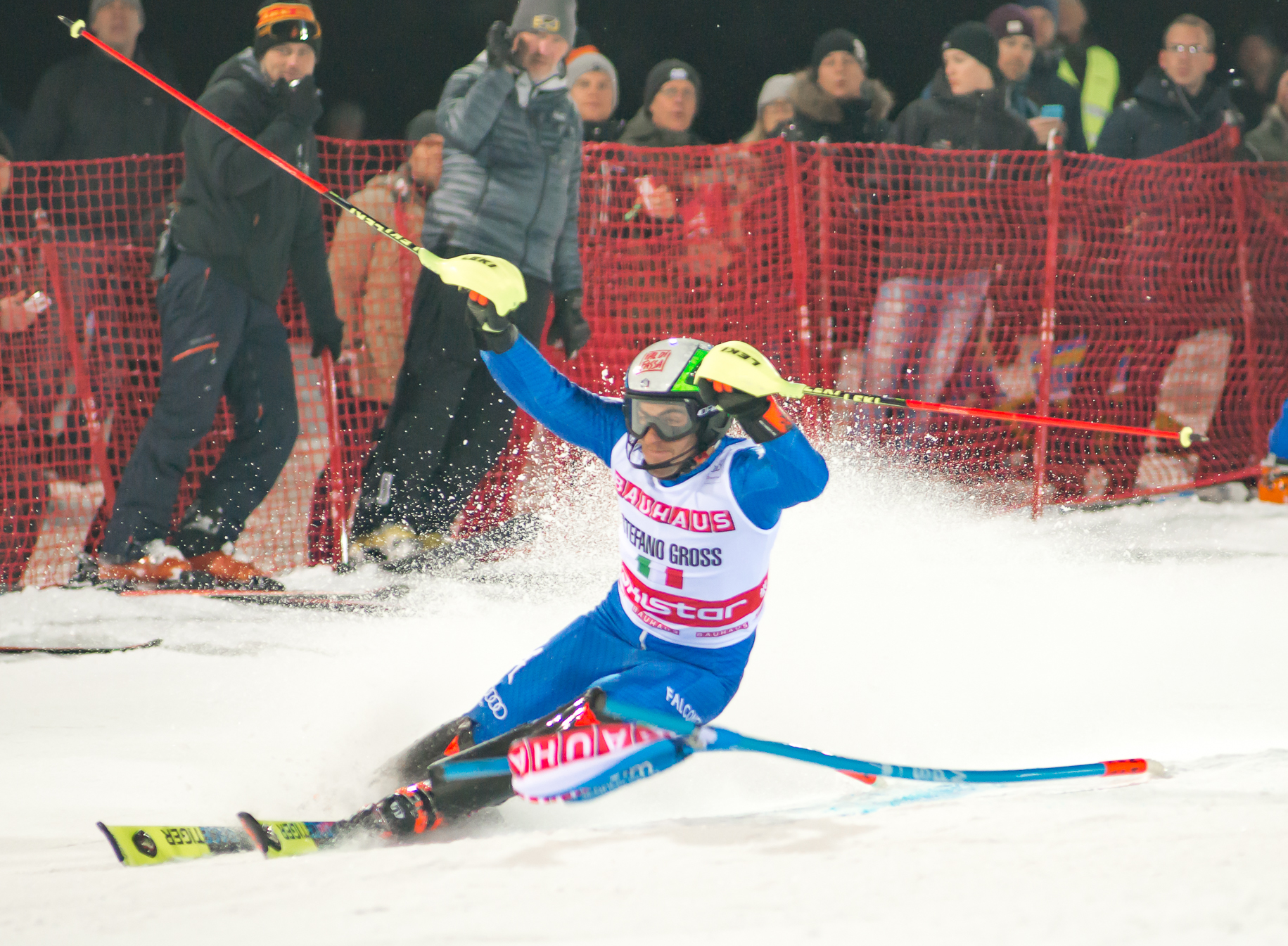
Gross in Hammarbybacken World Cup 2018

Stefano "Sabo" Gross (born 4 September 1986) is a World Cup alpine ski racer from northern Italy. Born in Bozen, South Tyrol, Gross was raised in Pozza di Fassa in Trentino; he races in the technical events and specializes in the slalom.

== Career ==
Gross made his World Cup debut at Alta Badia in December 2008, and his best results are three podiums in slalom in 2015, including a victory in Adelboden. Gross has represented Italy at seven World Championships and finished tenth in the slalom in 2017. He was fourth in the slalom at the 2014 Winter Olympics.

== World Cup results ==
=== Season standings ===
Season	Age	Overall	Slalom	Giant slalom	Super-G	Downhill	Combined	Parallel
2009	22	142	61	—	—	—	—	—N/a
2010	23	129	51	—	—	—	—	—N/a
2011	24	104	36	—	—	—	—	—N/a
2012	25	25	5	—	—	—	—	—N/a
2013	26	36	12	—	—	—	—	—N/a
2014	27	45	13	—	—	—	—	—N/a
2015	28	16	6	—	—	—	—	—N/a
2016	29	28	6	—	—	—	—	—N/a
2017	30	21	7	—	—	—	—	—N/a
2018	31	32	9	—	—	—	—	—N/a
2019	32	59	20	—	—	—	—	—N/a
2020	33	82	27	—	—	—	—	—
2021	34	76	27	—	—	—	—N/a	—
2022	35	96	35	—	—	—	—N/a	—
2023	36	70	24	—	—	—	—N/a	—N/a
2024	37	104	38	—	—	—	—N/a	—N/a
2025	38	83	33	—	—	—	—N/a	—N/a

=== Race podiums ===
- 1 win – (1 SL)
- 12 podiums – (11 SL, 1 PSL), 47 top tens

Season	Date	Location	Discipline	Place
2012	8 Jan 2012	Adelboden, Switzerland	Slalom	3rd
2012	24 Jan 2012	Schladming, Austria	Slalom	2nd
2012	19 Feb 2012	Bansko, Bulgaria	Slalom	3rd
2015	11 Jan 2015	Adelboden, Switzerland	Slalom	1st
2015	17 Jan 2015	Wengen, Switzerland	Slalom	2nd
2015	27 Jan 2015	Schladming, Austria	Slalom	2nd
2016	17 Jan 2016	Wengen, Switzerland	Slalom	3rd
2016	23 Feb 2016	Stockholm, Sweden	Parallel slalom	3rd
2016	6 Mar 2016	Kranjska Gora, Slovenia	Slalom	3rd
2017	22 Dec 2016	Madonna di Campiglio, Italy	Slalom	3rd
2017	5 Mar 2017	Kranjska Gora, Slovenia	Slalom	2nd
2020	15 Dec 2019	Val d'Isère, France	Slalom	3rd

== World Championship results ==
Year	Age	Slalom	Giant slalom	Super-G	Downhill	Combined	Team combined	Parallel	Team event
2011	24	22	—	—	—	—	—N/a	—N/a	—
2013	26	11	—	—	—	—	—N/a	—N/a	—
2015	28	DNF2	—	—	—	—	—N/a	—N/a	—
2017	30	9	—	—	—	—	—N/a	—N/a	—
2019	32	10	—	—	—	—	—N/a	—N/a	—
2021	34	DNF1	—	—	—	—	—N/a	—	—
2023	36	18	—	—	—	—	—N/a	—	—
2025	38	20	—	—	—	—N/a	7	—N/a	—

== Olympic results ==
Year	Age	Slalom	Giant slalom	Super-G	Downhill	Combined	Team event
2014	27	4	—	—	—	—	—N/a
2018	31	16	—	—	—	—	5
