= Mark Engel =

Mark Engel may refer to:

- Mark Engel (bishop), born 1955, American bishop of the Anglican Church in North America
- Mark Engel (skier), born 1991, American alpine ski racer
