= Michel Macedo =

Michel Macedo may refer to:

- Michel Macedo (footballer) (born 1990), Brazilian footballer
- Michel Macedo (skier) (born 1998), Brazilian alpine skier
