= Erik Read =

Canadian alpine skier (born 1991)

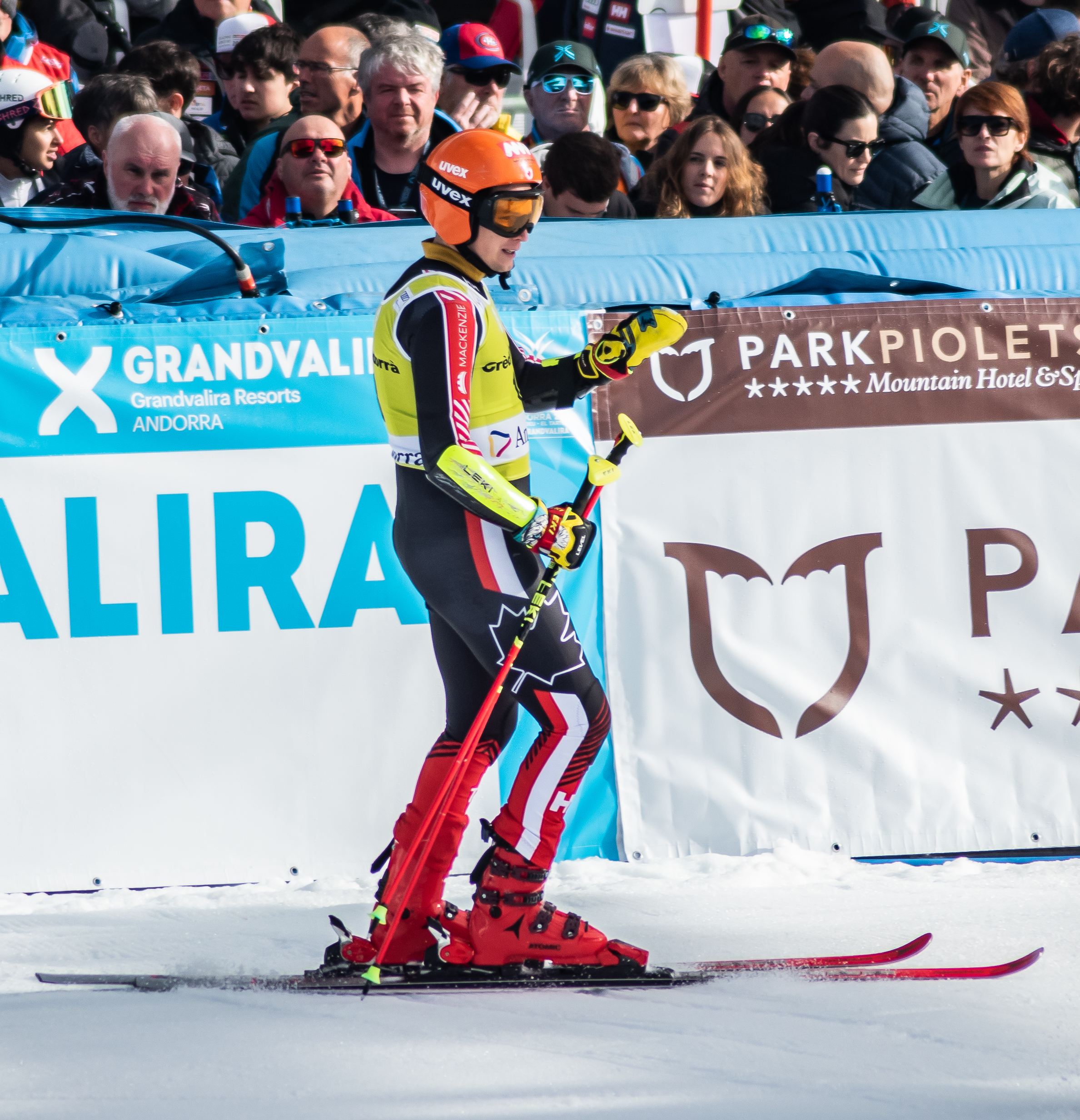

Personal information
- Born: May 31, 1991 (age 35) Calgary, Alberta, Canada
- Education: University of Denver
- Height: 1.81 m (5 ft 11 in)
- Family: Ken Read (father); Jeffrey Read (brother)

Skiing career
- Country: Canada
- Sport: Alpine skiing
- Club: Banff Alpine Racers
- Disciplines: Slalom, giant slalom
- World Cup debut: January 25, 2011 (age 19)

Olympics
- Teams: 2 – (2018, 2022)
- Medals: 0

World Championships
- Teams: 6 – (2015–2025)
- Medals: 2 (0 gold)

World Cup
- Seasons: 12 – (2011–2022)
- Podiums: 0
- Overall titles: 0 − (33rd in 2022)
- Discipline titles: 0 − (7th in PAR, 2022)
Medal record
Men's alpine skiing
Representing Canada
World Championships
Silver medal – second place	2015 Beaver Creek	Team event
Bronze medal – third place	2023 Méribel	Team event

Erik Read (born May 31, 1991) is a Canadian World Cup alpine ski racer specializing the technical events of slalom and giant slalom. Born and raised in Calgary, Alberta, he represented Canada at two Winter Olympics and five World Championships.

== Career ==
At his first World Championships in 2015 at Beaver Creek, USA, Read finished in the top thirty in giant slalom and slalom. He was also in the Nations Team Event (NTE), in which Canada won the silver medal. He competed in slalom and giant slalom at the 2018 Winter Olympics.

Read is a two-time Canadian champion in slalom (2013 and 2014) and won the overall title in the North American Cup (Nor-Am Cup) in 2012.

He graduated from the University of Denver and competed for the Pioneers in alpine skiing.

Read's parents are famous Canadian ski racers Ken and Lynda (Robbins) Read; his father was one of the Crazy Canucks downhill racers of the late 1970s and early 1980s. Younger brother Jeffrey (b.1997) is also a World Cup alpine racer specializing in speed events.

In January 2022, Read was named to Canada's Olympic team.

== World Cup results ==
=== Season standings ===
Season
Season	Age	Overall	Slalom	Giant slalom	Super-G	Downhill	Combined	Parallel
2015	23	140	52	—	—	—	—	—N/a
2016	24	142	52	—	—	—	—	—N/a
2017	25	43	29	28	—	—	14	—N/a
2018	26	73	32	30	—	—	—	—N/a
2019	27	83	45	28	—	—	—	—N/a
2020	28	56	35	23	—	—	—	28
2021	29	48	36	20	—	—	—N/a	12
2022	30	33	27	16	—	—	—N/a	7
2023	31	49	29	21	—	—	—N/a	—N/a
2024	32	92	43	35	—	—	—N/a	—N/a
2025	33	118	49	47	—	—	—N/a	—N/a
2026	34	121	—	38	—	—	—N/a	—N/a

Standings through 1 February 2026

=== Top ten finishes ===
- 0 podiums
- 8 top tens – (5 GS, 1 SL, 1 AC, 1 PG)

Season
Season	Date	Location	Discipline	Place
2017	4 Dec 2016	Val-d'Isère, France	Giant slalom	9th
2017	10 Dec 2016	Val-d'Isère, France	Giant slalom	8th
2017	29 Dec 2016	Santa Caterina, Italy	Combined	6th
2017	22 Jan 2017	Kitzbühel, Austria	Slalom	7th
2020	27 Oct 2019	Sölden, Austria	Giant slalom	7th
2021	5 Dec 2020	Santa Caterina, Italy	Giant slalom	10th
2021	7 Dec 2020	Santa Caterina, Italy	Giant slalom	10th
2022	14 Nov 2021	Lech/Zürs, Austria	Parallel-G	7th

== World Championship results ==
Year
Year	Age	Slalom	Giant slalom	Super-G	Downhill	Combined	Team combined	Parallel	Team event
2015	23	24	28	—	—	—	—N/a	—N/a	2
2017	25	DNF1	23	—	—	—	—N/a	—N/a	5
2019	27	DNF1	DNF1	—	—	—	—N/a	—N/a	9
2021	29	DNF2	DNF1	—	—	—	—N/a	BDNF	7
2023	31	31	DNF2	—	—	—	—N/a	DNQ	3
2025	33	24	22	—	—	—N/a	17	—N/a	—

== Olympic results ==
Year
Year	Age	Slalom	Giant slalom	Super-G	Downhill	Combined	Team event
2018	26	29	11	—	—	—	9
2022	30	24	13	—	—	—	9
