= Planai (ski course) =

Ski course in Austria

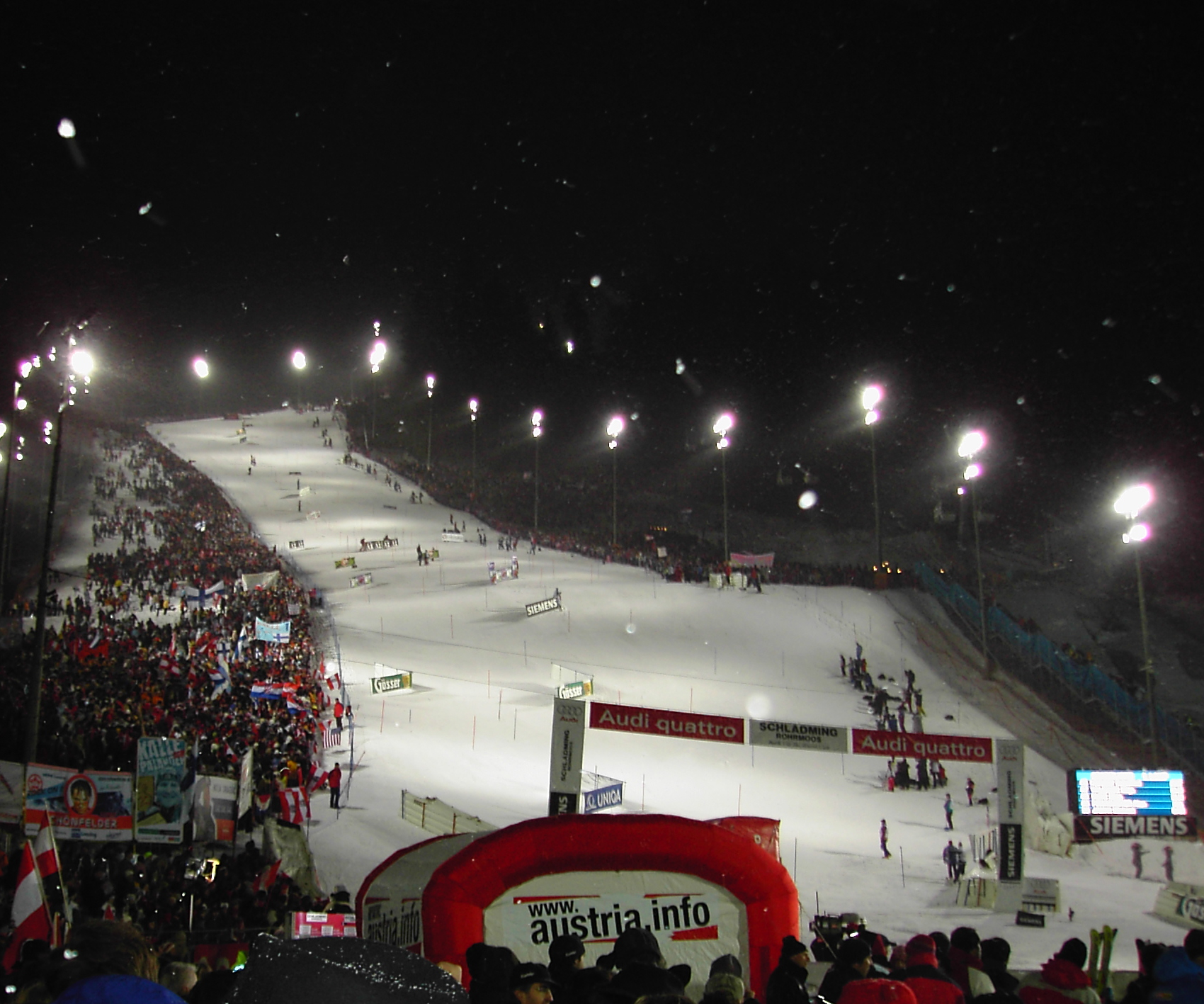
- Interactive map of Planai
- Location within Austria
- 47°22′03″N 13°43′34″E
- Location: Schladming, Styria, Austria
- Mountain: Planai
- Opened: 1975; 51 years ago
- Member: Club5+

Giant slalom
- Start: 1,148 m (3,766 ft) (AA)
- Finish: 759 m (2,490 ft)
- Vertical drop: 389 m (1,276 ft)
- Max incline: 31.4 degrees (61%)
- Avg incline: 22.3 degrees (41%)
- Min incline: 6.8 degrees (12%)

Slalom
- Start: 967 m (3,173 ft) (AA)
- Finish: 749 m (2,457 ft)
- Vertical drop: 218 m (715 ft)
- Max incline: 28.4 degrees (54%)
- Avg incline: 20.2 degrees (36.8%)
- Most Wins (M): (Norway) Henrik Kristoffersen (5x)

Planai is a World Cup ski course, located on the same name mountain and ski resort in Schladming, Styria, Austria. It opened in 1973, hosting a World Cup downhill in December.

Since 1997, it has regularly hosted night slalom, the highest attended (50,000) on the World Cup circuit.

The giant slalom course has as an average incline of 41% (61% maximum, 12% minimum) and is among the most demanding on the circuit.

The course hosted two World Championships (1982, 2013) and the World Cup finals in March 2012.

== History ==
Planai opened in late 1973 with a downhill event, won by Franz Klammer with Roland Collombin and Bernhard Russi on the podium. Until the end of the decade and through the 1980s, all disciplines were regularly held on this course.

In 1982, they organized the World Championships for the first time, with all men's events and only a giant slalom event for women held on the course.

In 1988, they replaced the originally scheduled resorts of Les Menuires (women) and Val Thorens (men) as the season opening venue at the last minute, due to weather conditions.

In 1990, Schladming hosted the last World Cup weekend with a downhill, slalom, and combined events, before a 7-year break and entering a new era.

In 1997, Planai organized their first slalom under floodlight. Since then this has become the most visited and most spectacular slalom in the world.

In 2013, Schladming hosted its second World Championships, having completely renovated the finish area with a notable arc of steel.

== World Championships ==
=== Men's events ===
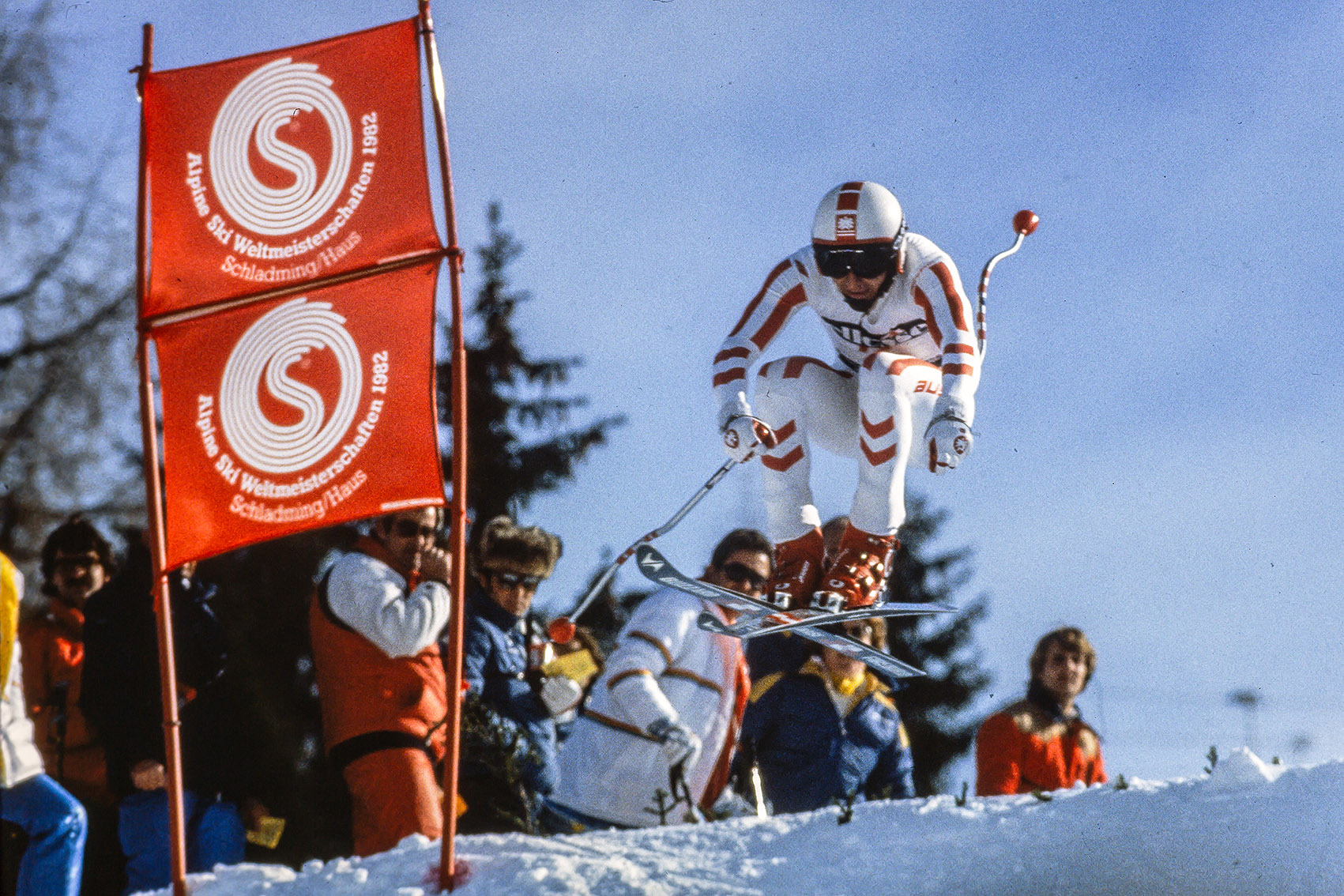
Franz Klammer in 1982

Event	Type	Date	Gold	Silver	Bronze
1982	GS	3 February 1982	(United States) Steve Mahre	(Sweden) Ingemar Stenmark	(Socialist Federal Republic of Yugoslavia) Boris Strel
1982	KB	(SL) 1 February 1982 (DH) 5 February 1982	(France) Michel Vion	(Switzerland) Peter Lüscher	(Austria) Anton Steiner
1982	DH	6 February 1982	(Austria) Harti Weirather	(Switzerland) Conradin Cathomen	(Austria) Erwin Resch
1982	SL	7 February 1982	(Sweden) Ingemar Stenmark	(Socialist Federal Republic of Yugoslavia) Bojan Križaj	(Sweden) Bengt Fjällberg
2013	SG	6 February 2013	(United States) Ted Ligety	(France) Gauthier de Tessières	(Norway) Aksel Lund Svindal
2013	DH	9 February 2013	(Norway) Aksel Lund Svindal	(Italy) Dominik Paris	(France) David Poisson
2013	SC	11 February 2013	(United States) Ted Ligety	(Croatia) Ivica Kostelić	(Austria) Romed Baumann
2013	GS	15 February 2013	(United States) Ted Ligety	(Austria) Marcel Hirscher	(Italy) Manfred Mölgg
2013	SL	17 February 2013	(Austria) Marcel Hirscher	(Germany) Felix Neureuther	(Austria) Mario Matt

=== Women's events ===
Event	Type	Date	Gold	Silver	Bronze
1982	GS	2 February 1982	(Switzerland) Erika Hess	(United States) Christin Cooper	(Liechtenstein) Ursula Konzett
2013	GS	14 February 2013	(France) Tessa Worley	(Slovenia) Tina Maze	(Austria) Anna Fenninger

=== Team event ===
Event	Type	Date	Gold	Silver	Bronze
2013	TE	12 February 2013	Austria Nicole Hosp; Michaela Kirchgasser; Carmen Thalmann; Marcel Hirscher; Marcel Mathis; Philipp Schörghofer	Sweden Nathalie Eklund; Frida Hansdotter; Maria Pietilä Holmner; Jens Byggmark; Mattias Hargin; André Myhrer	Germany Lena Dürr; Maria Höfl-Riesch; Veronique Hronek; Fritz Dopfer; Stefan Luitz; Felix Neureuther

== World Cup ==
=== Men ===
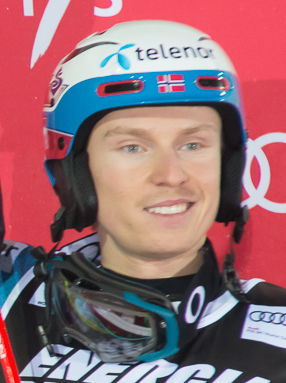
Henrik Kristoffersen has won a record five (5) World Cup slaloms at Planai

No.	Type	Season	Date	Winner	Second	Third
162	DH	1973/74	22 December 1973	(Austria) Franz Klammer	(Switzerland) Roland Collombin	(Switzerland) Bernhard Russi
210	DH	1975/76	20 December 1975	(Canada) Dave Irwin	(Austria) Klaus Eberhard	(Italy) Herbert Plank
211	SL	1975/76	21 December 1975	(Austria) Hansi Hinterseer	(Sweden) Ingemar Stenmark	(Italy) Piero Gros
285	GS	1978/79	9 December 1978	(Sweden) Ingemar Stenmark	(Switzerland) Peter Lüscher	(Italy) Leonardo David
286	DH	1978/79	10 December 1978	(Canada) Ken Read	(Canada) Dave Murray	(Soviet Union) Vladimir Makeev
287	KB	1978/79	10 December 1978	(Switzerland) Peter Lüscher	(Austria) Leonhard Stock	(Liechtenstein) Andreas Wenzel
	DH	1979/80	22 December 1979	cancelled after 28 skiers due to poor visibility		
368	GS	1980/81	2 February 1981	(Sweden) Ingemar Stenmark	(Austria) Hans Enn	(Switzerland) Jean-Luc Fournier
	DH	1980/81	7 February 1981	cancelled		
499	GS	1984/85	8 January 1985	(Switzerland) Thomas Bürgler	(Luxembourg) Marc Girardelli	(Switzerland) Martin Hangl
534	DH	1985/86	31 December 1985	(Austria) Peter Wirnsberger	(Switzerland) Peter Müller	(Austria) Erwin Resch
621	DH	1987/88	29 January 1988	(Switzerland) Pirmin Zurbriggen	(Switzerland) Franz Heinzer	(West Germany) Peter Durr
622	GS	1987/88	30 January 1988	(Austria) Rudolf Nierlich	(Austria) Hubert Strolz	(Austria) Helmut Mayer
633	SG	1988/89	27 November 1988	(Switzerland) Pirmin Zurbriggen	(France) Franck Piccard	(Austria) Leonhard Stock
676	DH	1989/90	11 January 1990	(France) Franck Piccard	(Italy) Kristian Ghedina	(Switzerland) Daniel Mahrer
677	SL	1989/90	12 January 1990	(West Germany) Armin Bittner	(Austria) Michael Tritscher	(Italy) Konrad Ladstätter (Japan) Tetsuya Okabe
678	KB	1989/90	12 January 1990	(Switzerland) Pirmin Zurbriggen	(Switzerland) Paul Accola	(Austria) Günther Mader
921	SL	1996/97	30 January 1997	(Italy) Alberto Tomba	(Austria) Thomas Stangassinger	(France) Sébastien Amiez
948	SL	1997/98	8 January 1998	(Italy) Alberto Tomba	(Austria) Thomas Sykora	(Norway) Hans Petter Buraas
949	SG	1997/98	10 January 1998	(Austria) Hermann Maier	(Austria) Stephan Eberharter	(Italy) Luca Cattaneo
950	SG	1997/98	11 January 1998	(Austria) Hermann Maier	(Austria) Andreas Schifferer	(Austria) Stephan Eberharter
985	SL	1998/99	7 January 1999	(Austria) Benjamin Raich	(France) Pierrick Bourgeat	(Norway) Kjetil André Aamodt
986	SG	1998/99	9 January 1999	(Austria) Hermann Maier	(Austria) Rainer Salzgeber	(Austria) Hans Knauß
1039	SL	1999/00	9 March 2000	(Austria) Mario Matt	(Norway) Kjetil André Aamodt	(Austria) Thomas Stangassinger
1066	SL	2000/01	23 January 2001	(Austria) Benjamin Raich	(Norway) Hans Petter Buraas	(Slovenia) Mitja Kunc
1102	SL	2001/02	22 January 2002	(United States) Bode Miller	(France) Jean-Pierre Vidal	(Croatia) Ivica Kostelić
1140	SL	2002/03	28 January 2003	(Finland) Kalle Palander	(Austria) Benjamin Raich	(Norway) Hans Petter Buraas
1174	SL	2003/04	27 January 2004	(Austria) Benjamin Raich	(Italy) Manfred Mölgg	(Finland) Kalle Palander
1213	SL	2004/05	25 January 2005	(Austria) Manfred Pranger	(Austria) Benjamin Raich	(Sweden) André Myhrer
1250	SL	2005/06	24 January 2006	(Finland) Kalle Palander	(Japan) Akira Sasaki	(Austria) Benjamin Raich
1285	SL	2006/07	30 January 2007	(Austria) Benjamin Raich	(Sweden) Jens Byggmark	(Austria) Mario Matt
1322	SL	2007/08	22 January 2008	(Austria) Mario Matt	(France) Jean-Baptiste Grange	(Italy) Manfred Mölgg
1362	SL	2008/09	27 January 2009	(Austria) Reinfried Herbst	(Austria) Manfred Pranger	(Croatia) Ivica Kostelić
1398	SL	2009/10	26 January 2010	(Austria) Reinfried Herbst	(Switzerland) Silvan Zurbriggen	(Austria) Manfred Pranger
1430	SL	2010/11	25 January 2011	(France) Jean-Baptiste Grange	(Sweden) André Myhrer	(Sweden) Mattias Hargin
1466	SL	2011/12	24 January 2012	(Austria) Marcel Hirscher	(Italy) Stefano Gross	(Austria) Mario Matt
1484	DH	2011/12	14 March 2012	(Norway) Aksel Lund Svindal	(Switzerland) Beat Feuz	(Austria) Hannes Reichelt
1485	SG	2011/12	15 March 2012	(Italy) Christof Innerhofer	(France) Alexis Pinturault	(Austria) Marcel Hirscher
1486	GS	2011/12	17 March 2012	(Austria) Marcel Hirscher	(Austria) Hannes Reichelt	(Austria) Marcel Mathis
1545	SL	2013/14	28 January 2014	(Norway) Henrik Kristoffersen	(Austria) Marcel Hirscher	(Germany) Felix Neureuther
1580	SL	2014/15	27 January 2015	(Russia) Alexander Khoroshilov	(Italy) Stefano Gross	(Germany) Felix Neureuther
1616	SL	2015/16	26 January 2016	(Norway) Henrik Kristoffersen	(Austria) Marcel Hirscher	(Russia) Aleksandr Khoroshilov
1659	SL	2016/17	24 January 2017	(Norway) Henrik Kristoffersen	(Austria) Marcel Hirscher	(Russia) Aleksandr Khoroshilov
1698	SL	2017/18	23 January 2018	(Austria) Marcel Hirscher	(Norway) Henrik Kristoffersen	(Switzerland) Daniel Yule
1735	SL	2018/19	29 January 2019	(Austria) Marcel Hirscher	(France) Alexis Pinturault	(Switzerland) Daniel Yule
1771	SL	2019/20	28 January 2020	(Norway) Henrik Kristoffersen	(France) Alexis Pinturault	(Switzerland) Daniel Yule
1805	SL	2020/21	26 January 2021	(Austria) Marco Schwarz	(France) Clément Noël	(France) Alexis Pinturault
1842	SL	2021/22	25 January 2022	(Germany) Linus Strasser	(Norway) Atle Lie McGrath	(Austria) Manuel Feller
1878	SL	2022/23	24 January 2023	(France) Clément Noël	(Switzerland) Ramon Zenhäusern	(Norway) Lucas Braathen
1879	GS	2022/23	25 January 2023	(Switzerland) Loïc Meillard	(Switzerland) Gino Caviezel	(Austria) Marco Schwarz
1912	GS	2023/24	24 January 2024	(Switzerland) Marco Odermatt	(Austria) Manuel Feller	(Slovenia) Žan Kranjec
1913	SL	2023/24	25 January 2024	(Germany) Linus Straßer	(Norway) Timon Haugan	(France) Clément Noël
1951	GS	2024/25	28 January 2025	(Norway) Alexander Steen Olsen	(Norway) Henrik Kristoffersen	(Switzerland) Marco Odermatt
1952	SL	2024/25	29 January 2025	(Norway) Timon Haugan	(Austria) Manuel Feller	(Austria) Fabio Gstrein
1990	GS	2025/26	27 January 2026	(Switzerland) Loïc Meillard	(Brazil) Lucas Pinheiro Braathen	(France) Alban Elezi Cannaferina
1991	SL	2025/26	28 January 2026	(Norway) Henrik Kristoffersen (5)	(Norway) Atle Lie McGrath	(France) Clément Noël

=== Women ===
No.	Type	Season	Date	Winner	Second	Third
584	SG	1988–89	26 November 1988	(France) Carole Merle	(Austria) Ulrike Maier	(West Germany) Regine Mösenlechner (Austria) Anita Wachter
1387	GS	2011–12	18 March 2012	(Germany) Viktoria Rebensburg	(Austria) Anna Fenninger	(Italy) Federica Brignone
1717	SL	2021–22	11 January 2022	(United States) Mikaela Shiffrin	(Slovakia) Petra Vlhová	(Germany) Lena Dürr

=== Alpine team event ===
No.	Type	Season	Date	Winner	Second	Third
6	TE	2011–12	16 March 2012	Austria Eva-Maria Brem; Michaela Kirchgasser; Stephanie Köhle; Max Franz; Marcel Mathis; Philipp Schörghofer	Switzerland Lara Gut; Wendy Holdener; Markus Vogel; Ralph Weber; Silvan Zurbriggen	Sweden Therese Borssén; Frida Hansdotter; Anna Swenn-Larsson; Axel Bäck; Mattias Hargin; André Myhrer

Not in original calendar. It replaced women's GS from Les Menuires (1988), men's GS from Val Thorens (1988) and SL from Flachau (2022).

== Club5+ ==
In 1986, the elite Club5 was originally founded by prestigious classic downhill organizers: Kitzbühel, Wengen, Garmisch, Val d’Isère and Val Gardena/Gröden, with the goal to bring alpine ski sport on the highest levels possible.

Later, other classic longterm organizers joined the now named Club5+: Alta Badia, Cortina, Kranjska Gora, Maribor, Lake Louise, Schladming, Adelboden, Kvitfjell, St. Moritz and Åre.
