= Casper Dyrbye Næsted =

Danish alpine skier (born 1996)

Personal information
- Born: 19 June 1996 (age 30)

Skiing career
- Sport: Alpine skiing
- Club: Skiklubben Hareskov
- Disciplines: Slalom, giant slalom
- World Cup debut: 13 November 2016 (age 20)

Olympics
- Teams: 2 – (2018), (2022)

World Championships
- Teams: 4 – (2015–21)

World Cup
- Seasons: 3 – (2017–19)

Casper Dyrbye Næsted (born 19 June 1996) is a Danish alpine ski racer.

He competed at the 2015 World Championships in Beaver Creek, US, in the slalom.

He represented Denmark at the 2018 Winter Olympics. He competed at the 2022 Winter Olympics.

== World Cup results ==
=== Results per discipline ===
Discipline	WC starts	WC Top 30	WC Top 15	WC Top 5	WC Podium	Best result		
Discipline	WC starts	WC Top 30	WC Top 15	WC Top 5	WC Podium	Date	Location	Place
Slalom	7	0	0	0	0	22 January 2017	Kitzbühel, Austria	46th
Giant slalom	0	0	0	0	0			
Super-G	0	0	0	0	0			
Downhill	0	0	0	0	0			
Combined	0	1	0	0	0			
Total	7	0	0	0	0			

- Standings through 24 February 2021

== World Championship results ==
Year
Year	Age	Slalom	Giant; Slalom	Super G	Downhill	Combined	Team Event
2015	18	36	59	—	—	—	—
2017	20	46	DNFQ2	—	—	—	—
2019	22	DNF1	45	—	—	—	—
2021	24	26	33	—	—	—	—
2023	26	DNF1	58	—	—	—	16

== Olympic results ==
Year
Year	Age	Slalom	Giant; Slalom	Super G	Downhill	Combined	Team event
2018	21	DNF1	60	—	—	—	—

== Other results ==
=== European Cup results ===
==== Results per discipline ====
Discipline	EC starts	EC Top 30	EC Top 15	EC Top 5	EC Podium	Best result		
Discipline	EC starts	EC Top 30	EC Top 15	EC Top 5	EC Podium	Date	Location	Place
Slalom	10	0	0	0	0	17 December 2020	Val di Fassa, Italy	38th
Giant slalom	0	0	0	0	0			
Super-G	0	0	0	0	0			
Downhill	0	0	0	0	0			
Combined	0	0	0	0	0			
Total	10	0	0	0	0			

- Standings through 6 February 2024

=== Far East Cup results ===
==== Results per discipline ====
Discipline	FEC starts	FEC Top 30	FEC Top 15	FEC Top 5	FEC Podium	Best result		
Discipline	FEC starts	FEC Top 30	FEC Top 15	FEC Top 5	FEC Podium	Date	Location	Place
Slalom	2	0	0	0	0	DNF2 2 times		
Giant slalom	2	0	0	0	0	7 December 2018	Wanlong Ski Resort, China	44th
Super-G	0	0	0	0	0			
Downhill	0	0	0	0	0			
Combined	0	0	0	0	0			
Total	4	0	0	0	0			

- Standings through 2 February 2024
