= Mark Engel (skier) =

American alpine ski racer (born 1991)

Mark Engel (born October 1, 1991) is an American alpine ski racer.

== Career ==
He competed at the 2017 World Championships and the 2018 Winter Olympics. Engel re-qualified for the 2014-2015 "C" team after winning the NCAA title in giant slalom with the University of Utah in 2014. In 2019, he won the NCAA national championship with the University of Utah. He finished 12th in the giant slalom and won All American honors with a 9th-place finish in slalom.
