= FIS Alpine World Ski Championships 2017 – Men's giant slalom =

Men's giant slalom at the FIS Alpine World Ski Championships 2017
- Venue: Piz Nair
- Location: St. Moritz, Switzerland
- Dates: 17 February
- Competitors: 106 from 60 nations
- Winning time: 2:13.31

Medalists
gold medal	Marcel Hirscher	Austria
silver medal	Roland Leitinger	Austria
bronze medal	Leif Kristian Haugen	Norway

The Men's giant slalom competition at the 2017 World Championships was held on 17 February 2017.

A qualification was held on 16 February 2017.

== Results ==
The first run was started at 09:45 and the second run at 13:30.

Rank	Bib	Name	Nation	Run 1	Rank	Run 2	Rank	Total	Diff
1st place, gold medalist(s)	6	Marcel Hirscher	Austria	1:06.73	1	1:06.58	6	2:13.31	
2nd place, silver medalist(s)	22	Roland Leitinger	Austria	1:07.26	6	1:06.30	1	2:13.56	+0.25
3rd place, bronze medalist(s)	13	Leif Kristian Haugen	Norway	1:07.27	7	1:06.75	11	2:14.02	+0.71
4	4	Henrik Kristoffersen	Norway	1:07.21	5	1:06.86	13	2:14.07	+0.76
5	5	Philipp Schörghofer	Austria	1:06.99	2	1:07.17	20	2:14.16	+0.85
6	8	Matts Olsson	Sweden	1:07.12	4	1:07.12	19	2:14.24	+0.93
7	7	Alexis Pinturault	France	1:07.08	3	1:07.21	21	2:14.29	+0.98
8	15	Justin Murisier	Switzerland	1:07.84	12	1:06.46	5	2:14.30	+0.99
9	3	Mathieu Faivre	France	1:07.51	8	1:06.85	12	2:14.36	+1.05
10	21	Riccardo Tonetti	Italy	1:07.58	9	1:06.89	15	2:14.47	+1.16
11	30	David Chodounsky	United States	1:08.07	17	1:06.43	3	2:14.50	+1.19
12	43	Linus Straßer	Germany	1:08.03	15	1:06.66	7	2:14.69	+1.38
13	1	Victor Muffat-Jeandet	France	1:07.88	13	1:06.86	13	2:14.74	+1.43
14	12	Stefan Luitz	Germany	1:07.94	14	1:06.89	15	2:14.83	+1.52
15	23	Gino Caviezel	Switzerland	1:08.16	18	1:06.69	9	2:14.85	+1.54
16	2	Felix Neureuther	Germany	1:08.52	21	1:06.41	2	2:14.93	+1.62
17	9	Florian Eisath	Italy	1:07.78	11	1:07.24	22	2:15.02	+1.71
18	19	Steve Missillier	France	1:08.71	23	1:06.44	4	2:15.15	+1.84
19	20	Filip Zubčić	Croatia	1:07.70	10	1:07.59	26	2:15.29	+1.98
20	16	Manfred Mölgg	Italy	1:08.27	20	1:07.10	18	2:15.37	+2.06
21	27	Loïc Meillard	Switzerland	1:08.74	24	1:06.68	8	2:15.42	+2.11
22	17	Carlo Janka	Switzerland	1:08.05	16	1:07.46	24	2:15.51	+2.20
23	25	Erik Read	Canada	1:08.81	28	1:06.71	10	2:15.52	+2.21
24	35	Simon Maurberger	Italy	1:08.26	19	1:07.53	25	2:15.79	+2.48
25	39	Ryan Cochran-Siegle	United States	1:09.02	30	1:07.09	17	2:16.11	+2.80
26	36	Bjørnar Neteland	Norway	1:08.81	28	1:07.32	23	2:16.13	+2.82
27	40	Mattias Rönngren	Sweden	1:09.12	31	1:08.18	27	2:17.30	+3.99
28	45	Štefan Hadalin	Slovenia	1:09.13	32	1:08.42	28	2:17.55	+4.24
29	44	Kristoffer Jakobsen	Sweden	1:09.38	36	1:08.70	31	2:18.08	+4.77
30	47	Albert Popov	Bulgaria	1:09.40	37	1:08.81	32	2:18.21	+4.90
31	48	Adam Barwood	New Zealand	1:09.99	41	1:08.42	28	2:18.41	+5.10
32	28	Kryštof Krýzl	Czech Republic	1:09.62	38	1:08.81	32	2:18.43	+5.12
33	33	Eemeli Pirinen	Finland	1:10.25	42	1:08.69	30	2:18.94	+5.63
34	34	Andreas Žampa	Slovakia	1:08.77	25	1:11.16	40	2:19.93	+6.62
35	54	Juan Del Campo	Spain	1:09.77	39	1:10.19	37	2:19.95	+6.65
36	53	Axel Esteve	Andorra	1:10.26	43	1:10.10	36	2:20.36	+7.05
37	66	Matej Falat	Slovakia	1:10.43	45	1:09.96	35	2:20.39	+7.08
38	61	Sebastiano Gastaldi	Argentina	1:10.57	46	1:09.89	34	2:20.46	+7.15
39	56	Cristian Javier Simari Birkner	Argentina	1:10.86	47	1:10.63	38	2:21.49	+8.18
40	65	Laurie Taylor	Great Britain	1:11.04	49	1:10.99	39	2:22.03	+8.72
41	59	Steffan Winkelhorst	Netherlands	1:10.92	48	1:11.59	41	2:22.51	+9.20
42	60	Yohei Koyama	Japan	1:11.92	53	1:11.63	42	2:23.55	+10.24
43	93	Andrej Drukarov	Lithuania	1:14.40	57	1:13.66	43	2:28.06	+14.75
44	74	Kieran Norris	Ireland	1:14.55	58	1:14.62	44	2:29.17	+15.86
45	78	Igor Zakurdayev	Kazakhstan	1:14.62	59	1:15.28	45	2:29.90	+16.59
46	90	Erjon Tola	Albania	1:15.32	60	1:15.96	46	2:31.28	+17.97
—	29	Samu Torsti	Finland	1:08.65	22	DNF			
—	37	Phil Brown	Canada	1:08.78	27	DNF			
—	38	Aleksandr Andrienko	Russia	1:09.29	34	DNF			
—	49	Maarten Meiners	Netherlands	1:08.77	25	DNF			
—	51	Simon Efimov	Russia	1:12.27	54	DNF			
—	64	William Vukelić	Croatia	1:11.44	51	DNF			
—	67	Sven von Appen	Chile	1:11.04	49	DNF			
—	81	Sturla Snær Snorrason	Iceland	1:11.78	52	DNF			
—	82	Marko Stevović	Serbia	1:13.14	56	DNF			
—	85	Yuri Danilochkin	Belarus	1:12.94	55	DNF			
—	87	Rodolfo Dickson	Mexico	1:15.48	61	DNQ			
—	91	Ioannis Proios	Greece	1:15.82	62	DNQ			
—	88	Itamar Biran	Israel	1:15.97	63	DNQ			
—	92	Kamiljon Tukhtaev	Uzbekistan	1:16.41	64	DNQ			
—	96	Behnam Shemshaki	Iran	1:19.47	65	DNQ			
—	100	Alessandro Mariotti	San Marino	1:20.03	66	DNQ			
—	72	Michael Poettoz	Colombia	1:21.29	67	DNQ			
—	102	Connor Wilson	South Africa	1:21.50	68	DNQ			
—	103	Naim Fenianos	Lebanon	1:21.84	69	DNQ			
—	101	Giorgos Kakkouras	Cyprus	1:24.02	70	DNQ			
—	105	Max Castermans	Luxembourg	1:24.91	71	DNQ			
—	106	Andy Randriamiarisoa	Madagascar	1:27.96	72	DNQ			
—	104	Himanshu Thakur	India	1:32.41	73	DNQ			
—	10	Andre Myhrer	Sweden	1:09.97	40	DNS			
—	14	Manuel Feller	Austria	1:09.18	33	DNS			
—	41	Joan Verdú	Andorra	1:09.35	35	DNS			
—	58	Kristaps Zvejnieks	Latvia	1:10.37	44	DNS			
—	11	Žan Kranjec	Slovenia	DNF					
—	18	Aleksander Aamodt Kilde	Norway	DNF					
—	24	Tommy Ford	United States	DNF					
—	26	Tim Jitloff	United States	DNF					
—	31	Pavel Trikhichev	Russia	DNF					
—	32	Trevor Philp	Canada	DNF					
—	42	Willis Feasey	New Zealand	DNF					
—	46	Miha Hrobat	Slovenia	DNF					
—	50	Ondřej Berndt	Czech Republic	DNF					
—	52	Martin Čater	Slovenia	DNF					
—	55	Filip Forejtek	Czech Republic	DNF					
—	57	Dries Van den Broecke	Belgium	DNF					
—	62	Daniel Paulus	Czech Republic	DNF					
—	63	Kai Horwitz	Chile	DNF					
—	68	Tomas Birkner De Miguel	Argentina	DNF					
—	69	Andrés Figueroa	Chile	DNF					
—	70	Tom Verbeke	Belgium	DNF					
—	71	Žaks Gedra	Latvia	DNF					
—	73	Marko Šljivić	Bosnia and Herzegovina	DNF					
—	75	Juhan Luik	Estonia	DNF					
—	76	Benjamin Szőllős	Hungary	DNF					
—	77	Martin Hyška	Slovakia	DNF					
—	79	Simon Breitfuss Kammerlander	Bolivia	DNF					
—	80	Marcus Vorre	Denmark	DNF					
—	83	Alex Beniaidze	Georgia	DNF					
—	84	Luka Bozhinovski	Macedonia	DNF					
—	86	Alexandru Barbu	Romania	DNF					
—	89	Evgeniy Timofeev	Kyrgyzstan	DNF					
—	94	Arthur Hanse	Portugal	DNF					
—	95	Albin Tahiri	KOS	DNF					
—	97	Jeremy Denat	Peru	DNF					
—	98	Ivan Kovbasnyuk	Ukraine	DNF					
—	99	Zhang Yangming	China	DSQ					
