= Henrik Kristoffersen =

Norwegian alpine skier (born 1994)

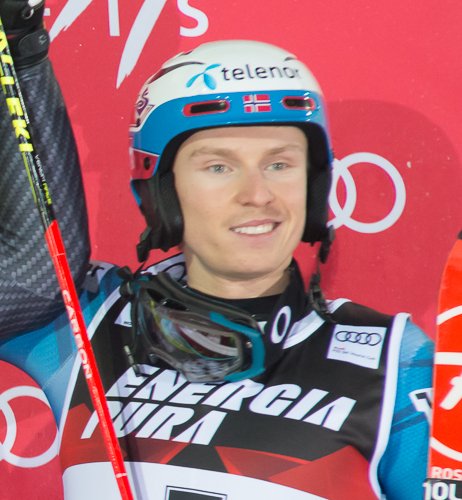
- Kristoffersen in 2017

Personal information
- Born: 2 July 1994 (age 32) Rælingen, Akershus, Norway
- Height: 1.79 m (5 ft 10 in)
- Website: henrikkristoffersen.com

Skiing career
- Country: Norway
- Sport: Alpine skiing
- Club: Rælingen SK
- Disciplines: Slalom, Giant slalom
- World Cup debut: 11 March 2012 (age 17)

Olympics
- Teams: 4 – (2014–2026)
- Medals: 3 (0 gold)

World Championships
- Teams: 7 – (2013–2025)
- Medals: 3 (2 gold)

World Cup
- Seasons: 15 – (2012–2026)
- Wins: 34 – (26 SL, 8 GS)
- Podiums: 102 – (62 SL, 38 GS, 2 PG)
- Overall titles: 0 – (2nd in 2016, 2018, 2025)
- Discipline titles: 5 – (4 SL – 2016, 2020, 2022, 2025; 1 GS – 2020)
Medal record
Men's alpine skiing
Representing Norway
World Cup race podiums
Event	1st	2nd	3rd
Slalom	26	17	19
Giant slalom	8	18	12
Parallel	0	2	0
Total	34	37	31
International alpine ski competitions
Event	1st	2nd	3rd
Olympic Games	0	1	2
World Championships	2	0	1
Total	2	1	3
Olympic Games
Silver medal – second place	2018 Pyeongchang	Giant slalom
Bronze medal – third place	2014 Sochi	Slalom
Bronze medal – third place	2026 Milano Cortina	Slalom
World Championships
Gold medal – first place	2019 Åre	Giant slalom
Gold medal – first place	2023 Courchevel	Slalom
Bronze medal – third place	2021 Cortina d’Ampezzo	Slalom
Junior World Championships
Gold medal – first place	2012 Roccaraso	Giant slalom
Gold medal – first place	2013 Mont-Sainte-Anne	Combined
Gold medal – first place	2014 Jasná	Giant slalom
Gold medal – first place	2014 Jasná	Slalom
Gold medal – first place	2015 Hafjell	Giant slalom
Gold medal – first place	2015 Hafjell	Slalom
Silver medal – second place	2012 Roccaraso	Slalom
Silver medal – second place	2012 Roccaraso	Combined

Henrik Kristoffersen (born 2 July 1994) is a Norwegian World Cup alpine ski racer, World Champion, and Olympic medalist. He specializes in the technical events of slalom and giant slalom.

== Career ==
Born in Rælingen in Akershus county, Kristoffersen made his World Cup debut in March 2012 in Kranjska Gora, Slovenia, and attained his first podium in November 2013, a third-place finish in slalom at Levi, Finland. At the 2014 Winter Olympics in Sochi, Kristoffersen won the bronze medal in slalom at Rosa Khutor at age 19 to become the youngest male medalist in Olympic alpine skiing history.

Kristoffersen is the first to win the three classic slalom races in Adelboden, Wengen, and Kitzbühel in the same season; accomplished at age 21 in January 2016. During this run, he became the most successful Norwegian in the history of World Cup slalom competition. With his seventh win at Wengen, Kristoffersen tied Finn Christian Jagge, and the eighth came a week later in Kitzbühel to set the record. His ninth slalom victory was two days later (26 January), at the Schladming night race.

At the World Championships in 2019, Kristoffersen won the gold medal in the giant slalom at Åre, Sweden.

== Achievements ==
Kristoffersen is the first to win the four January classic slalom races (of Adelboden, Wengen, Kitzbühel, and Schladming) in a single season.

In the 2016 season, Kristoffersen became the first male racer in 24 years to win six World Cup slalom races during a single season; Alberto Tomba won nine World Cup races (six slalom, three giant slalom) in the 1992 season.

== World Cup results ==
=== Season titles ===
Season
Season	Discipline
2016	Slalom
2020	Slalom
2020	Giant slalom
2022	Slalom
2025	Slalom

=== Season standings ===
Season
Season	Age	Overall	Slalom	Giant slalom	Super-G	Downhill	Combined	Parallel
2013	18	60	22	41	—	—	—	—N/a
2014	19	7	3	9	—	—	—	—N/a
2015	20	8	4	6	—	—	—	—N/a
2016	21	2	1	3	—	—	—	—N/a
2017	22	3	2	5	—	—	—	—N/a
2018	23	2	2	2	—	—	—	—N/a
2019	24	3	5	2	—	—	29	—N/a
2020	25	3	1	1	48	—	26	8
2021	26	6	6	8	—	—	—N/a	2
2022	27	3	1	2	—	—	—N/a	4
2023	28	3	2	2	—	—	—N/a	—N/a
2024	29	4	6	4	—	—	—N/a	—N/a
2025	30	2	1	2	—	—	—N/a	—N/a
2026	31	5	4	7	—	—	—N/a	—N/a

=== Race victories ===
	Total	Slalom	Giant slalom	Super-G	Downhill	Combined	Parallel
Wins	34	26	8	—	—	—	0
Podiums	102	62	38	—	—	—	2

#	Season			
#	Season	Date	Location	Discipline
1	2014	28 January 2014	Schladming, Austria	Slalom
2	2015	16 November 2014	Levi, Finland	Slalom
3	2015	15 March 2015	Kranjska Gora, Slovenia	Slalom
4	2015	21 March 2015	Méribel, France	Giant slalom
5	2016	13 December 2015	Val d'Isère, France	Slalom
6	2016	22 December 2015	Madonna di Campiglio, Italy	Slalom
7	2016	10 January 2016	Adelboden, Switzerland	Slalom
8	2016	17 January 2016	Wengen, Switzerland	Slalom
9	2016	24 January 2016	Kitzbühel, Austria	Slalom
10	2016	26 January 2016	Schladming, Austria	Slalom
11	2017	11 December 2016	Val d'Isère, France	Slalom
12	2017	22 December 2016	Madonna di Campiglio, Italy	Slalom
13	2017	8 January 2017	Adelboden, Switzerland	Slalom
14	2017	15 January 2017	Wengen, Switzerland	Slalom
15	2017	24 January 2017	Schladming, Austria	Slalom
16	2018	21 January 2018	Kitzbühel, Austria	Slalom
17	2019	24 February 2019	Bansko, Bulgaria	Giant slalom
18	2019	9 March 2019	Kranjska Gora, Slovenia	Giant slalom
19	2020	24 November 2019	Levi, Finland	Slalom
20	2020	22 December 2019	Alta Badia, Italy	Giant slalom
21	2020	28 January 2020	Schladming, Austria	Slalom
22	2021	22 December 2020	Madonna di Campiglio, Italy	Slalom
23	2021	31 January 2021	Chamonix, France	Slalom
24	2022	19 December 2021	Alta Badia, Italy	Giant slalom
25	2022	26 February 2022	Garmisch-Partenkirchen, Germany	Slalom
26	2022	27 February 2022	Garmisch-Partenkirchen, Germany	Slalom
27	2022	12 March 2022	Kranjska Gora, Slovenia	Giant slalom
28	2022	13 March 2022	Kranjska Gora, Slovenia	Giant slalom
29	2023	4 January 2023	Garmisch-Partenkirchen, Germany	Slalom
30	2023	15 January 2023	Wengen, Switzerland	Slalom
31	2025	15 December 2024	Val d'Isère, France	Slalom
32	2025	1 March 2025	Kranjska Gora, Slovenia	Giant slalom
33	2025	2 March 2025	Kranjska Gora, Slovenia	Slalom
34	2026	28 January 2026	Schladming, Austria	Slalom

== World Championship results ==
Year
Year	Age	Slalom	Giant slalom	Super-G	Downhill	Combined	Team combined
2013	18	DNF2	20	—	—	—	—N/a
2015	20	4	13	—	—	—	—N/a
2017	22	4	4	—	—	—	—N/a
2019	24	8	1	—	—	—	—N/a
2021	26	3	9	—	—	—	—N/a
2023	28	1	5	—	—	—	—N/a
2025	30	13	8	—	—	—N/a	—

== Olympic results ==
Year
Year	Age	Slalom	Giant slalom	Super-G	Downhill	Combined	Team combined
2014	19	3	10	—	—	—	—N/a
2018	23	DNF2	2	—	—	—	—N/a
2022	27	4	8	—	—	—	—N/a
2026	31	3	7	—	—	—N/a	—

== See also ==
- List of FIS Alpine Ski World Cup men's race winners
