= Ashot Karapetyan =

Armenian alpine skier (born 1999)

Personal information
- Nationality: Armenian
- Born: 9 May 1999 (age 25)

Sport
- Sport: Alpine skiing

Ashot Karapetyan (born 9 May 1999) is an Armenian alpine skier. He competed in the 2018 Winter Olympics.
