= Matteo Gatti =

Sammarinese Skier

Personal information
- Born: 14 May 2001 (age 24)
- Occupation: Alpine skier ♂

Matteo Gatti (born May 14, 2001) is a Sammarinese alpine skier who competed at the 2022 Beijing Winter Olympics in the slalom and giant slalom. In the slalom he finished 43rd out of 45 finishers, whereas in the giant slalom he placed 49th out of 54 finishers in his first run and was disqualified from his 2nd.
