= Kamen Zlatkov =

Bulgarian alpine skier (born 1997)

Kamen Zlatkov (Bulgarian: Камен Златков; born 9 August 1997 in Sofia) is a Bulgarian male alpine skier, racing for the ski club Moten.

At the 2017 World Championships he participated at the giant slalom and slalom races, finishing 36th in the slalom. His debut in the FIS Alpine Ski World Cup was on the 12 November 2017.

He competed at the 2018 Winter Olympics where he did not finish the men's slalom and giant slalom races.
