= Emir Lokmić =

Bosnian alpine skier (born 1997)

Personal information
- Born: 23 December 1997 (age 27); Sarajevo, Bosnia and Herzegovina

Sport
- Sport: Alpine skiing

Emir Lokmić (born December 23, 1997) is a Bosnian male alpine skier from who has competed for Bosnia and Herzegovina at the 2018 and 2022 Winter Olympics.

As of 2024, he skis for SK Alpin from Sarajevo.
