= Eldar Salihović =

Montenegrin alpine skier (born 1999)

Personal information
- Born: 17 June 1999 (age 25); Pljevlja, FR Yugoslavia

Sport
- Country: Montenegro
- Sport: Alpine skiing

Eldar Salihović (Croatian pronunciation: [salǐːxoʋitɕ]; born 17 June 1999) is a Montenegrin alpine skier. He competed in giant slalom at the 2018 and 2022 Winter Olympics.
