= Strahinja Stanišić =

Serbian alpine skier (born 1995)

Personal information
- Born: 23 March 1995 (age 31) Sarajevo, Bosnia and Herzegovina
- Height: 195 cm (6 ft 5 in)

Skiing career
- Sport: Alpine skiing
- Disciplines: Giant slalom, slalom

Olympics
- Teams: Youth Olympic Games Team Serbia EYOF Team Serbia

World Championships
- Teams: 1 – (13)
- Medals: 0 (0 gold)

Strahinja Stanišić (Serbian Cyrillic: Страхиња Станишић; born 23 March 1995 in Sarajevo) is a Serbian alpine skier.

== Career ==
His first big international competition was 2012 Winter Youth Olympics. He represented Serbia in giant slalom and slalom. He finished 19th in giant slalom, in slalom race was disqualified. Debut at FIS Alpine World Ski Championships made in 2013 in Austrian Schladming. He participated in giant slalom qualifications and took 38th place, 74th overall. Couple days later he went to compete at the 2013 European Youth Olympic Winter Festival. Stanišić carried Serbian flag in the opening and closing ceremony. He competed in slalom and giant slalom. He finished slalom race on 17th place and was 33rd in giant slalom.

In 2012 attended FIS camp.
