= Matej Vidović =

Croatian alpine skier (born 1993)

Personal information
- Born: April 14, 1993 (age 31); Zagreb, Croatia
- Height: 1.93 m (6 ft 4 in)
- Weight: 92 kg (203 lb)

Matej Vidović (Croatian pronunciation: [mǎtej ʋîːdoʋitɕ]; born April 14, 1993 in Zagreb, Croatia) is a Croatian alpine skier, a slalom specialist. He competed for Croatia at the 2014 Winter Olympics in the slalom event, finishing 28th.
