= Willis Feasey =

New Zealand alpine skier (born 1992)

Personal information
- Born: 28 August 1992 (age 33) Christchurch, New Zealand
- Height: 175 cm (5 ft 9 in)
- Website: www.willisfeasey.wordpress.com

Skiing career
- Sport: Alpine skiing
- World Cup debut: Beaver Creek, USA

Olympics
- Teams: 1 – (2018)
- Medals: 0

World Championships
- Teams: 5 – (2013-2021)
- Medals: 0

Willis Feasey (born 28 August 1992) is a New Zealand alpine ski racer. He competed at the 2013 World Championships in Schladming, AUT, in the downhill.

He competed at the 2015 World Championships in Beaver Creek, USA, in the downhill.

He competed at the 2017 World Championships in St Moritz, SUI, in the Super G.

He competed at the 2019 World Championships in Åre, Sweden., SWE, in the Giant Slalom. He Competed in the 2018 Winter Olympics in Pyeongchang In Super G, Giant Slalom and Slalom
