= Ioannis Antoniou =

Greek alpine skier (born 1995)

Personal information
- Nationality: Hellenic
- Born: 27 January 1995 (age 31) Lamia, Greece
- Height: 185 cm (6 ft 1 in)
- Weight: 91 kg (201 lb)

Sport
- Sport: Alpine skiing
- Club: E.O.S Karpenisiou
- Turned pro: 2012
- Coached by: Pappos Stergios

Ioannis Antoniou (Greek: Ιωάννης Αντωνίου, born 27 January 1995) is an alpine skier from Greece. He competed for Greece at the 2018 and 2022 Winter Olympics.
