= Michel Macedo (skier) =

Brazilian alpine skier (born 1998)

Personal information
- Born: 23 September 1998 (age 27) Fortaleza, Brazil

Sport
- Sport: Alpine skiing
- College team: Middlebury
- Club: Cascade Winter Sports Club

Michel Macedo (born 23 September 1998) is a Brazilian alpine skier competing collegiately for Middlebury College. He competed in the 2018 Winter Olympics. On 17 February 2019, he had the best-result-ever by a Brazilian Alpine athlete with a 27.97 performance on the FIS Points List at the Dartmouth Carnival university race in New Hampshire (USA), according to the Brazilian Confederation of Snow Sports. He qualified to represent Brazil at the 2022 Winter Olympics. Macedo was unable to compete in the Men's Giant Slalom due to contracting COVID-19.

== Olympic Results ==
Year	Event	Result
2018	Men's Super-G	DNS
2018	Men's Giant Slalom	DNF
2018	Men's Slalom	DNF
2022	Men's Giant Slalom	DNS
2022	Men's Slalom	TBD

=== 2018 ===
Discipline	Round	Time	Rank	Bib
Super-G	Run 1	DNS	-	55
Giant Slalom	Run 1	DNF	-	67
Giant Slalom	Run 2	Did not advance	-	-
Slalom	Run 1	DNF	-	82
Slalom	Run 2	Did not advance	-	-

=== 2022 ===
Discipline	Round	Time	Rank	Bib
Giant Slalom	Run 1	DNS	-	46
Slalom	Run 1	59.88	37	57
Slalom	Run 2	DNF	-	-
