= Sturla Snær Snorrason =

Icelandic alpine skier (born 1994)

Personal information
- Nationality: Icelandic
- Born: 1 March 1994 (age 31); Reykjavík, Iceland

Sport
- Sport: Alpine skiing

Sturla Snær Snorrason (born 1 March 1994) is an Icelandic alpine skier. He competed in the 2018 Winter Olympics.
