= Aleksandr Andrienko =

Russian alpine skier (born 1990)

Aleksandr Aleksandrovich Andrienko (Russian: Александр Александрович Андриенко; born 8 May 1990 in Myski) is a Russian alpine ski racer.

== Biography ==
He was born on 8 May 1990 in Myski, Kemerovo Oblast. Since childhood, he has been engaged in skiing. His first coach was Ilya Poluarshinov.

He graduated from the Chernomyrdin Moscow State Open University.

Andrienko was the Russian 2017 Champion in giant slalom. He was the winner of several international competitions. In January 2018, it was announced that Andrienko would perform at the Olympic Games in Pyeongchang. Later, the Russian national team coaching staff announced that Andrienko had to withdraw from the competition due to an injury and would not perform in Korea.

He lives in Kaluga.
