= Mattias Rönngren =

Swedish alpine skier (born 1993)

Personal information
- Born: 22 November 1993 (age 32) Åre, Sweden
- Height: 1.78 m (5 ft 10 in)

Skiing career
- Sport: Alpine skiing
- Club: Åre SLK
- Disciplines: Giant slalom, slalom, combined, super-G
- World Cup debut: 12 December 2014 (age 21)

Olympics
- Teams: 1 – (2022)
- Medals: 0

World Championships
- Teams: 4 – (2017–2023)
- Medals: 1 (0 gold)

World Cup
- Seasons: 6 – (2015–16, 2018–21)
- Podiums: 0
- Overall titles: 0
- Discipline titles: 0
Medal record
Men's alpine skiing
Representing Sweden
World Championships
Silver medal – second place	2021 Cortina d’Ampezzo	Team event

Mattias Rönngren (born 22 November 1993) is a Swedish World Cup alpine ski racer.

At the 2021 World Championships, he was part of the mixed team that earned a silver medal for Sweden in the team event.

== World Cup results ==
=== Season standings ===
Season	Age	Overall	Slalom	Giant slalom	Super-G	Downhill	Combined	Parallel
2019	25	145	—	52	—	—	44	—N/a
2020	26	93	—	37	—	—	37	14
2021	27	110	—	40	—	—	—N/a	23
2022	28	110	—	36	—	—	—N/a	21

== World Championship results ==
Year	Age	Slalom	Giant slalom	Super-G	Downhill	Combined	Parallel	Team event
2017	23	—	27	—	—	—	—N/a	—
2019	25	—	DNF1	25	—	—	—N/a	—
2021	27	—	DNF2	DNF	—	DNF1	15	2
2023	29	—	21	—	—	—	12	11

== Olympic results ==
Year	Age	Slalom	Giant slalom	Super-G	Downhill	Combined	Team event
2022	28	—	DNF2	—	—	—	13
