= Mathieu Faivre =

French alpine skier (born 1992)

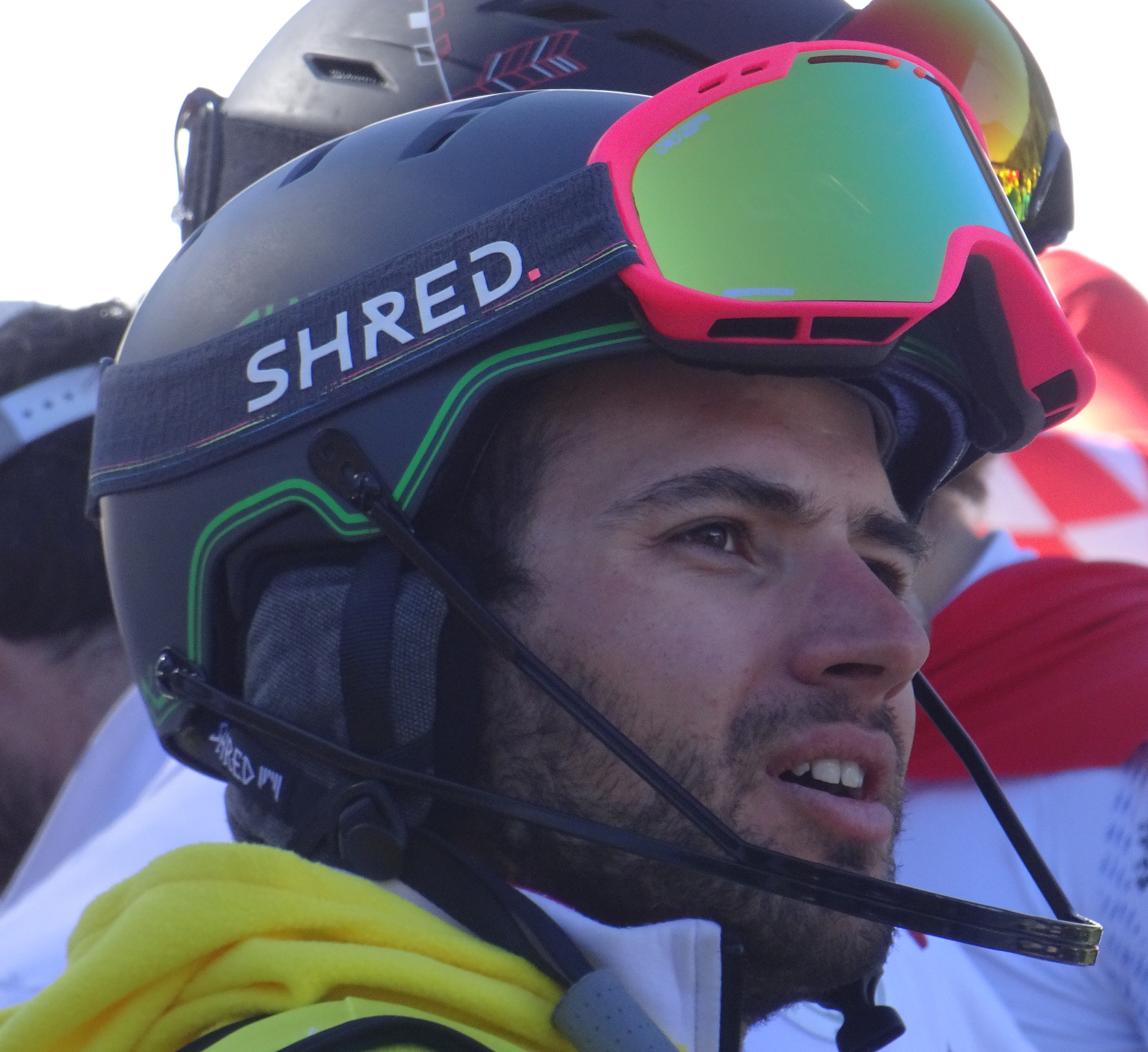
- Faivre in 2019

Personal information
- Born: 18 January 1992 (age 34) Nice, Alpes-Maritimes, France
- Height: 1.75 m (5 ft 9 in)

Skiing career
- Sport: Alpine skiing
- Club: Douanes / C.S. Isola
- Disciplines: Giant slalom
- World Cup debut: 12 March 2010 (age 18)

Olympics
- Teams: 3 – (2014, 2018, 2022)
- Medals: 1 (0 gold)

World Championships
- Teams: 6 – (2013–2023)
- Medals: 3 (3 gold)

World Cup
- Seasons: 12 – (2010–2021)
- Wins: 2 – (2 GS)
- Podiums: 10 – (10 GS)
- Overall titles: 0 – (14th in 2017)
- Discipline titles: 0 – (2nd in GS, 2017)
Medal record
Men's alpine skiing
Representing France
Olympic Games
Bronze medal – third place	2022 Beijing	Giant slalom
World Championships
Gold medal – first place	2017 St. Moritz	Team event
Gold medal – first place	2021 Cortina d'Ampezzo	Giant slalom
Gold medal – first place	2021 Cortina d'Ampezzo	Parallel
Junior World Championships
Gold medal – first place	2010 Les Houches	Giant slalom
Bronze medal – third place	2011 Crans Montana	Giant slalom

Mathieu Faivre (French pronunciation: [matjø fɛvʁ]; born 18 January 1992) is a French World Cup alpine ski racer, who specializes in giant slalom. He has competed for France in two Winter Olympics and six World Championships. In 2021, he won two gold medals for world titles in giant slalom and parallel giant slalom.

== Career ==
Born in Nice, Alpes-Maritimes, Faivre made his World Cup debut at age 18 in March 2010 and gained his first World Cup podium in February 2016 in a giant slalom at Naeba, Japan. Faivre's second podium came a month later at the World Cup finals in St. Moritz, Switzerland, part of an all-French podium, having led after the first run for the first time in his career. He ended the season at a career-high position of fourth in the final giant slalom standings. Faivre's first World Cup victory came on home country snow in December 2016 at Val-d'Isère.

At the 2021 World Championships in Cortina d'Ampezzo, Italy, Faivre won two gold medals. He took the inaugural parallel giant slalom and the giant slalom three days later. A week later, he gained his second World Cup win at Bansko, Bulgaria, after a runner-up finish the day before.

Faivre represented France in the giant slalom at the 2022 Winter Olympics. He finished his first run in third position and, despite falling behind Žan Kranjec on his second run, maintained his position to take the bronze medal after a mistake from Stefan Brennsteiner.

In October 2025, Faivre retired from competitions.

== Personal life ==
Faivre was in a relationship with Olympic and World Cup champion Mikaela Shiffrin from the summer of 2017 until 2019.

== World Cup results ==
=== Season standings ===
Season	Age	Overall	Slalom	Giant slalom	Super-G	Downhill	Combined	Parallel
2010	18	117	—	36	—	—	—	—N/a
2011	19	135	—	—	—	—	35	—N/a
2012	20	126	—	44	—	—	—	—N/a
2013	21	78	—	25	—	—	—	—N/a
2014	22	44	—	11	—	—	—	—N/a
2015	23	61	—	16	—	—	—	—N/a
2016	24	21	—	4	—	—	—	—N/a
2017	25	14	—	2	—	—	—	—N/a
2018	26	48	—	12	—	—	—	—N/a
2019	27	35	—	9	—	—	—	—N/a
2020	28	29	—	7	—	—	—	23
2021	29	16	—	5	—	—	—N/a	10
2022	30	46	—	13	36	—	—N/a	—
2023	31	93	—	31	—	—	—N/a	—N/a

=== Race podiums ===
- 2 wins – (2 GS)
- 10 podiums – (10 GS); 43 top tens

Season	Date	Location	Discipline	Place
2016	13 Feb 2016	Naeba, Japan	Giant slalom	2nd
2016	19 Mar 2016	St. Moritz, Switzerland	Giant slalom	3rd
2017	4 Dec 2016	Val-d'Isère, France	Giant slalom	1st
2017	18 Dec 2016	Alta Badia, Italy	Giant slalom	2nd
2017	18 Mar 2017	(United States) Aspen, USA	Giant slalom	3rd
2019	19 Dec 2018	Saalbach-Hinterglemm, Austria	Giant slalom	3rd
2020	27 Oct 2019	Sölden, Austria	Giant slalom	2nd
2021	27 Feb 2021	Bansko, Bulgaria	Giant slalom	2nd
2021	28 Feb 2021	Bansko, Bulgaria	Giant slalom	1st
2021	20 Mar 2021	Lenzerheide, Switzerland	Giant slalom	3rd

== World Championships results ==
Year	Age	Slalom	Giant slalom	Super-G	Downhill	Combined	Parallel	Team event
2013	21	—	21	—	—	—	—N/a	—
2015	23	—	DNF1	—	—	—	—N/a	5
2017	25	—	9	—	—	—	—N/a	1
2019	27	—	17	—	—	—	—N/a	5
2021	29	—	1	—	—	—	1	—
2023	31	—	19	—	—	—	—	—

== Olympic results ==
Year	Age	Slalom	Giant slalom	Super-G	Downhill	Combined	Team event
2014	22	—	24	—	—	—	—N/a
2018	26	—	7	—	—	—	—
2022	30	—	3	—	—	—	5
