= Matthias Mayer =

Austrian alpine skier (born 1990)

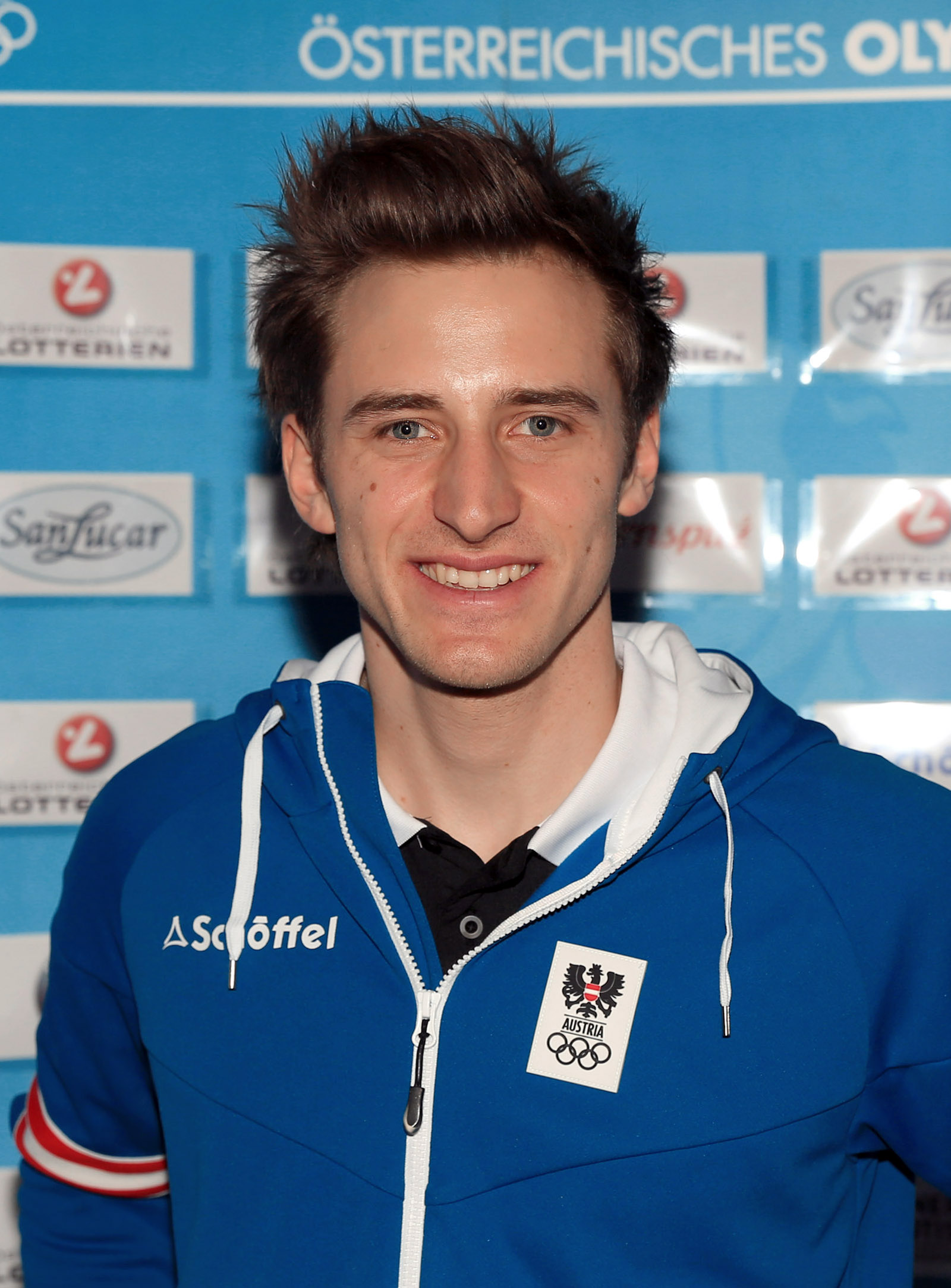
- Mayer in January 2014

Personal information
- Born: 9 June 1990 (age 36) Afritz am See, Carinthia, Austria
- Height: 1.79 m (5 ft 10 in)
- Website: matthiasmayer.at

Skiing career
- Sport: Alpine skiing
- Club: SC Gerlitzen – Kärnten
- Retired: 29 December 2022 (age 32)
- Disciplines: Downhill, super-G, combined, giant slalom
- World Cup debut: 22 February 2009 (age 18)

Olympics
- Teams: 3 – (2014, 2018, 2022)
- Medals: 4 (3 gold)

World Championships
- Teams: 5 – (2013–2021)
- Medals: 0

World Cup
- Seasons: 13 – (2011–2023)
- Wins: 11 – (7 DH, 3 SG, 1 AC)
- Podiums: 45 – (22 DH, 22 SG, 1 AC)
- Overall titles: 0 – (4th in 2020 and 2022)
- Discipline titles: 0 – (2nd in DH, 2021)
Medal record
Men's alpine skiing
Representing Austria
World Cup race podiums
Event	1st	2nd	3rd
Super-G	3	10	9
Downhill	7	5	10
Combined	1	0	0
Total	11	15	19
International alpine ski competitions
Event	1st	2nd	3rd
Olympic Games	3	0	1
World Championships	0	0	0
Total	3	0	1
Olympic Games
Gold medal – first place	2014 Sochi	Downhill
Gold medal – first place	2018 Pyeongchang	Super-G
Gold medal – first place	2022 Beijing	Super-G
Bronze medal – third place	2022 Beijing	Downhill
Junior World Championships
Silver medal – second place	2008 Formigal	Super-G

Matthias Mayer (German pronunciation: [maˈtiːas ˈmaɪɐ]; born 9 June 1990) is an Austrian retired World Cup alpine ski racer and Olympic champion.

== Career ==
Born in Afritz am See in Carinthia, Mayer made his World Cup debut in Sestriere in February 2009. His best discipline is super-G. After several top ten finishes, his first World Cup podium came at Kitzbühel in a super-G in January 2013.

At the 2014 Winter Olympics in Sochi, Russia, Mayer won the downhill to become the seventh Austrian gold medalist in the 18th edition of the event. Joining him on the podium at Rosa Khutor were Christof Innerhofer of Italy and Kjetil Jansrud of Norway. Immediately after the Olympics, he had two podium finishes in Norway, and a victory at the World Cup finals. He won his second Olympic gold medal in 2018 in the super G.

At the 2022 Winter Olympics, Mayer won the bronze medal in the downhill and successfully defended his title in the super G. With three Olympic titles in addition to a bronze, he is Austria's most decorated Olympic alpine medalist.

On 29 December 2022, Mayer shocked the ski racing community when he announced his immediate retirement at 32 years old, just hours before a super-G race in Bormio he was scheduled to start. He finished his World Cup career with 11 wins and 45 podium finishes in 13 seasons.

== Personal life ==
Mayer's father is Helmut Mayer (b.1966), the silver medalist in the first Olympic super-G in 1988; he also won a silver medal at the World Championships in 1989, in the giant slalom at Vail.

== World cup results ==
=== Season standings ===
Season
Season	Age	Overall	Slalom	Giant; Slalom	Super G	Downhill	Combined
2011	20	150	—	—	48	—	—
2012	21	50	—	—	13	—	26
2013	22	17	—	39	3	25	9
2014	23	9	—	44	4	5	11
2015	24	9	—	46	3	4	10
2016	25	57	—	—	18	34	—
2017	26	13	—	—	7	8	27
2018	27	9	—	41	10	6	7
2019	28	17	—	52	6	12	—
2020	29	4	—	33	4	3	3
2021	30	7	—	55	3	2	—N/a
2022	31	4	—	—	4	5	—N/a
2023	32	19	—	—	17	8	—N/a

Standings through 31 January 2023

=== Race victories ===
- 11 wins – (7 DH, 3 SG, 1 AC)
- 45 podiums – (22 DH, 22 SG, 1 AC)

Season
Season	Date	Location	Discipline
2014	12 Mar 2014	Lenzerheide, Switzerland	Downhill
2015	21 Feb 2015	Saalbach-Hinterglemm, Austria	Downhill
2015	22 Feb 2015	Saalbach-Hinterglemm, Austria	Super-G
2017	20 Jan 2017	Kitzbühel, Austria	Super-G
2018	14 Mar 2018	Åre, Sweden	Downhill
2020	1 Dec 2019	Lake Louise, Canada	Super-G
2020	17 Jan 2020	Wengen, Switzerland	Combined
2020	25 Jan 2020	Kitzbühel, Austria	Downhill
2020	7 Mar 2020	Kvitfjell, Norway	Downhill
2021	30 Dec 2020	Bormio, Italy	Downhill
2022	27 Nov 2021	Lake Louise, Canada	Downhill

== World Championship results ==
Year	Age	Slalom	Giant slalom	Super-G	Downhill	Combined
2013	22	—	—	5	13	10
2015	24	—	—	4	12	11
2017	26	—	—	DNF	11	17
2019	28	—	—	DNF	5	—
2021	30	—	—	6	DNF	DNF2

== Olympic results ==
Year	Age	Slalom	Giant slalom	Super-G	Downhill	Combined
2014	23	—	6	DNF	1	13
2018	27	—	—	1	9	DNF2
2022	31	—	—	1	3	—
