= Luca De Aliprandini =

Italian alpine skier (born 1990)

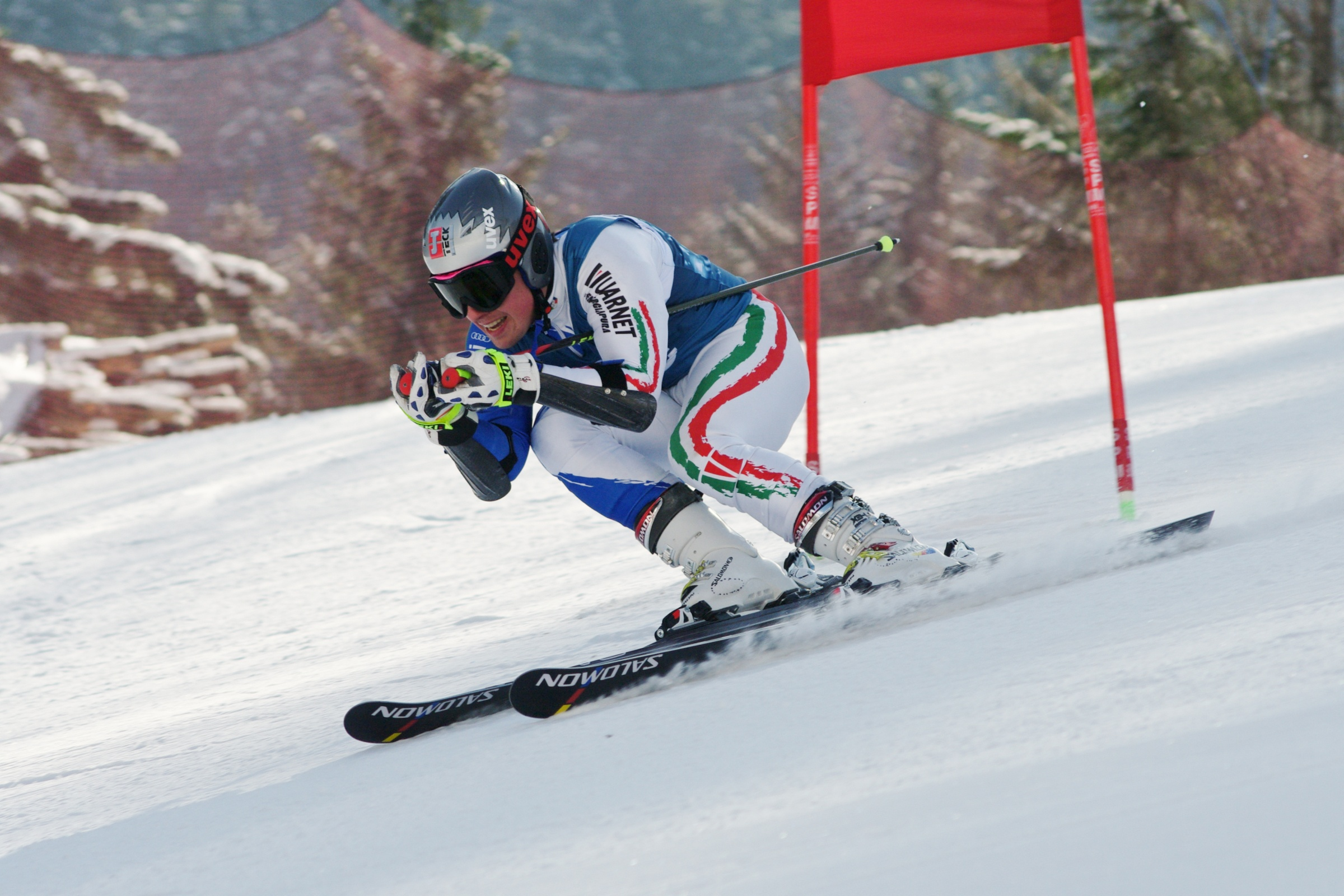
- Luca de Aliprandini in 2010

Personal information
- Born: 1 September 1990 (age 36) Cles, Trentino, Italy
- Height: 1.70 m (5 ft 7 in)

Skiing career
- Country: Italy
- Sport: Alpine skiing
- Disciplines: Giant slalom
- World Cup debut: 23 October 2011 (age 21)

Olympics
- Teams: 4 – (2014–2026)
- Medals: 0

World Championships
- Teams: 4 – (2019–2025)
- Medals: 1 (0 gold)

World Cup
- Seasons: 15 – (2012–2026)
- Wins: 0
- Podiums: 2 – (2 GS)
- Overall titles: 0 – (27th in 2022)
- Discipline titles: 0 – (6th in GS, 2022)
Medal record
Alpine skiing
Representing Italy
World Championships
Silver medal – second place	2021 Cortina d'Ampezzo	Giant slalom

Luca De Aliprandini (born 1 September 1990) is an Italian World Cup alpine ski racer and specializes in giant slalom. Born in Cles, Trentino, he competed for Italy at the 2014 Winter Olympics in alpine skiing, and again in 2018. At his second World Championships in 2021 at Cortina d'Ampezzo, Italy, De Aliprandini won the silver medal in the giant slalom. Ten months later, he gained his first World Cup podium, runner-up in giant slalom at Alta Badia.

He has been in a relationship with Swiss alpine ski racer Michelle Gisin since 2014. They announced their engagement in June 2024.

== World Cup results ==
=== Season standings ===
Season	Age	Overall	Slalom	Giant slalom	Super-G	Downhill	Combined
2013	22	103	—	35	—	—	—
2014	23	54	—	19	49	—	—
2015	24	—	—	—	—	—	—
2016	25	88	—	31	62	—	—
2017	26	41	—	11	35	—	41
2018	27	49	—	16	45	—	32
2019	28	47	—	15	—	—	—
2020	29	41	—	13	—	—	—
2021	30	36	—	11	—	—	—N/a
2022	31	27	—	6	—	—	—N/a
2023	32	59	—	16	—	—	—N/a
2024	33	50	—	17	—	—	—N/a
2025	34	38	—	10	—	—	—N/a
2026	35	102	—	33	—	—	—N/a

Standings through 14 February 2026

=== Top ten finishes ===
- 0 wins
- 2 podiums – (2 GS); 36 top tens

Date	Place	Discipline	Rank
14 Dec 2013	Val d'Isere, France	Giant slalom	6
15 Mar 2014	Lenzerheide, Switzerland	Giant slalom	7
26 Feb 2016	Hinterstoder, Austria	Giant slalom	7
23 Oct 2016	Sölden, Austria	Giant slalom	10
04 Dec 2016	Val d'Isère, France	Giant slalom	6
18 Dec 2016	Alta Badia, Italy	Giant slalom	7
29 Jan 2017	Garmisch-Partenkirchen, Germany	Giant slalom	10
17 Dec 2017	Alta Badia, Italy	Giant slalom	8
06 Jan 2018	Adelboden, Switzerland	Giant slalom	4
16 Dec 2018	Alta Badia, Italy	Giant slalom	7
19 Dec 2018	Saalbach-Hinterglemm, Austria	Giant slalom	9
16 Mar 2019	Soldeu, Andorra	Giant slalom	7
27 Oct 2019	Sölden, Austria	Giant slalom	8
22 Feb 2020	Niigata Yuzawa, Japan	Giant slalom	10
02 Mar 2020	Hinterstoder, Austria	Giant slalom	5
18 Oct 2020	Sölden, Austria	Giant slalom	10
07 Dec 2020	Santa Caterina Valfurva, Italy	Giant slalom	6
09 Jan 2021	Adelboden, Switzerland	Giant slalom	6
19 Mar 2021	Lenzerheide, Switzerland	Team Parallel	8
20 Mar 2021	Lenzerheide, Switzerland	Giant slalom	5
24 Oct 2021	Sölden, Austria	Giant slalom	8
11 Dec 2021	Val d'Isère, France	Giant slalom	4
19 Dec 2021	Alta Badia, Italy	Giant slalom	5
20 Dec 2021	Alta Badia, Italy	Giant slalom	2
12 Mar 2022	Kranjska Gora, Slovenia	Giant slalom	6
13 Mar 2022	Kranjska Gora, Slovenia	Giant slalom	10
11 Mar 2023	Kranjska Gora, Slovenia	Giant slalom	10
12 Mar 2023	Kranjska Gora, Slovenia	Giant slalom	8
18 Mar 2023	Soldeu, Andorra	Giant slalom	9
6 Jan 2024	Adelboden, Switzerland	Giant slalom	8
1 Mar 2024	(United States) Aspen, USA	Giant slalom	5
2 Mar 2024	(United States) Aspen, USA	Giant slalom	4
27 Oct 2024	Sölden, Austria	Giant slalom	10
8 Dec 2024	(United States) Beaver Creek, USA	Giant slalom	8
14 Dec 2024	Val d'Isère, France	Giant slalom	6
12 Jan 2025	Adelboden, Switzerland	Giant slalom	3
26 Mar 2025	(United States) Sun Valley, USA	Giant slalom	9

== World Championship results ==
Year	Age	Slalom	Giant slalom	Super-G	Downhill	Combined	Team combined	Parallel	Team event
2019	28	—	20	—	—	—	—N/a	—N/a	—
2021	30	—	2	—	—	—	—N/a	5	QF
2023	32	—	14	—	—	—	—N/a	8	—
2025	34	—	9	—	—	—N/a	—	—N/a	—

== Olympic results ==
Year	Age	Slalom	Giant slalom	Super-G	Downhill	Combined	Team combined	Team event
2014	23	—	11	—	—	—	—N/a	—N/a
2018	27	—	DSQ1	—	—	—	—N/a	—
2022	31	—	DNF2	—	—	—	—N/a	8
2026	35	—	DNF1	—	—	—N/a	—	—N/a
