= Tommy Ford (skier) =

American alpine skier

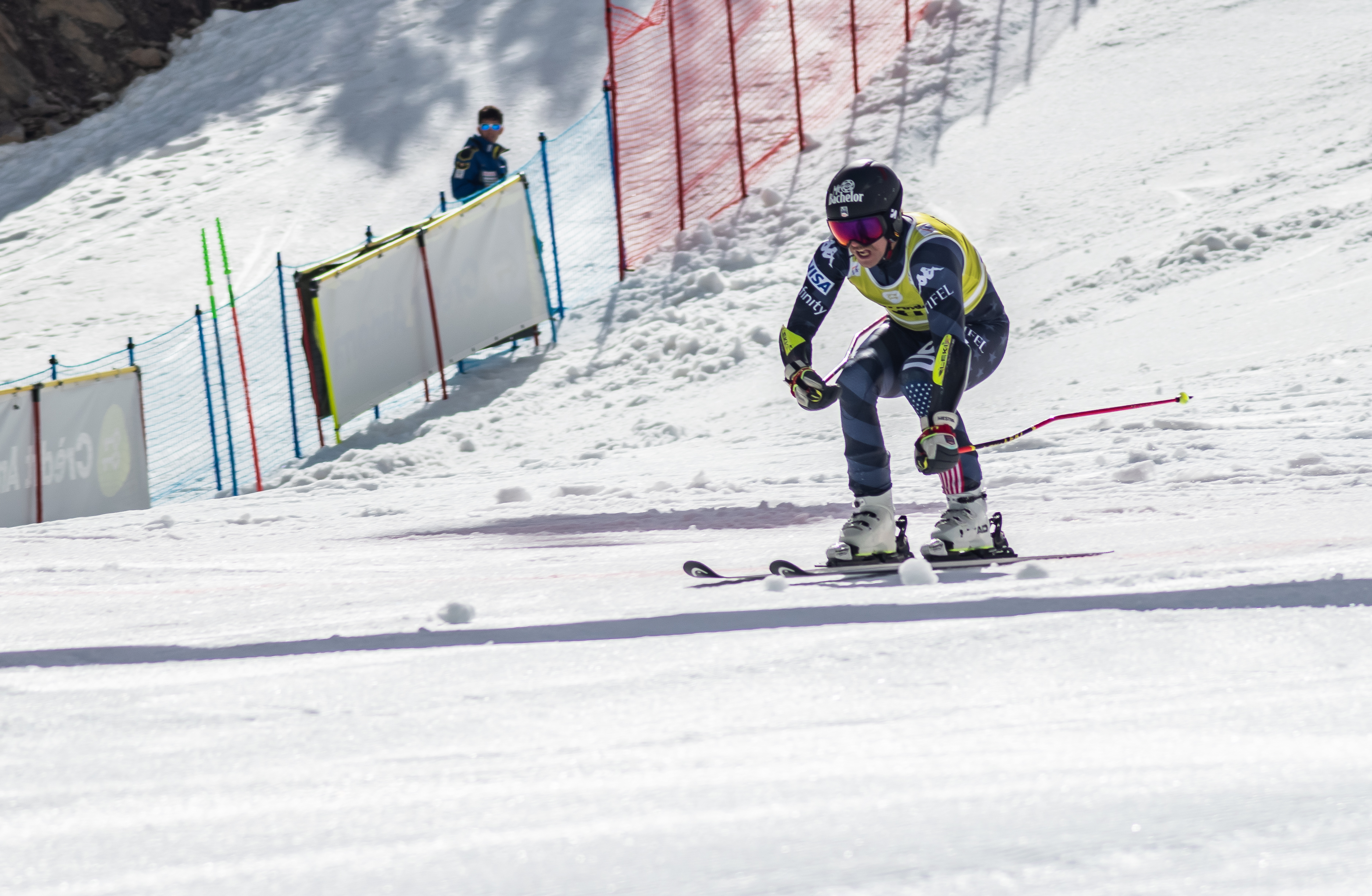
- Ford in 2023

Personal information
- Born: March 20, 1989 (age 37) Hanover, New Hampshire, United States
- Height: 5 ft 11 in (180 cm)
- Website: onionsontop.tumblr.com

Skiing career
- Sport: Alpine skiing
- Club: Mount Bachelor Ski; Education Foundation
- Disciplines: Giant slalom, super-G
- World Cup debut: October 25, 2009 (age 20)

Olympics
- Teams: 3 – (2010, 2018, 2022)
- Medals: 0

World Championships
- Teams: 5 – (2011, 2015–2019, 2023)
- Medals: 1 (1 gold)

World Cup
- Seasons: 13 – (2010–2013, 2015–2023)
- Wins: 1 – (1 GS)
- Podiums: 3 – (3 GS)
- Overall titles: 0 – (22nd in 2020)
- Discipline titles: 0 – (5th in GS, 2020)
Medal record
Men's alpine skiing
Representing the United States
World Championships
Gold medal – first place	2023 Méribel	Team event

Tommy Ford (born March 20, 1989) is an American World Cup alpine ski racer. He specializes in giant slalom and super-G; his best World Cup result to date is a first-place finish at a giant slalom event in December 2019. He has represented the US in three Winter Olympics and five World Championships.

== Career ==
Ford was on skis at age two, as his parents were racers and coaches. Raised in Bend, Oregon, he skied and raced at nearby Mount Bachelor and later attended Dartmouth College in New Hampshire, and has won eight titles at the U.S. Alpine Championships.

During the 2013 season, Ford fractured his right femur in mid-January while free skiing in La Clusaz, France. Following surgery in Annecy, he returned to the U.S. and missed over two years, including the 2013 World Championships and 2014 Winter Olympics. During the 2017 season, Ford had five top-20 finishes in giant slalom and was 25th in the season standings.

Ford attained his first career World Cup top-ten finish in December 2017, a tenth-place finish in giant slalom in Beaver Creek, Colorado. At the 2018 Winter Olympics at Pyeongchang, he was twentieth in the giant slalom at Yongpyong. Ford scored two more top-tens in March with a ninth at Kranjska Gora and an eighth at the World Cup finals at Åre and was 17th in the giant slalom standings for the 2018 season.

During the 2019 season, Ford had four top-ten finishes in giant slaloms and was tenth in the GS season standings.

Ford began the 2020 season with his strongest finish to date, with a fourth in the opening GS at Sölden, Austria. Several weeks later, he earned his first World Cup podium with a win in the giant slalom at Beaver Creek in December 2019.

He has qualified to represent the United States at the 2022 Winter Olympics.

== World Cup results ==
=== Season standings ===
Season	Age	Overall	Slalom	Giant slalom	Super G	Downhill	Combined	Parallel
2010	20	116	—	35	—	—	—	—N/a
2011	21	108	—	41	37	—	—	—N/a
2012	22	74	—	28	46	—	—	—N/a
2013	23	136	—	49	—	—	—	—N/a
2014	24	injured: did not compete						—N/a
2015	25	118	—	36	—	—	—	—N/a
2016	26	109	—	39	56	—	—	—N/a
2017	27	82	—	25	—	—	—	—N/a
2018	28	58	—	17	—	—	—	—N/a
2019	29	41	—	10	—	—	—	—N/a
2020	30	22	—	5	—	—	—	12
2021^	31	44	—	13	—	—	—N/a	—
2022	32	135	—	46	—	—	—N/a	—
2023	33	74	—	23	—	—	—N/a	—N/a
2024	34	48	—	20	—	—	—N/a	—N/a

Standings through 19 December 2023
^ Season-ending injuries on 9 January 2021

=== Race podiums ===
- 1 win – (1 GS)
- 3 podiums – (3 GS), 17 top tens (16 GS, 1 PG)

Season	Date	Location	Discipline	Place
2020	8 Dec 2019	Beaver Creek, United States	Giant slalom	1st
2020	22 Feb 2020	Yuzawa Naeba, Japan	Giant slalom	3rd
2021	7 Dec 2020	Santa Caterina, Italy	Giant slalom	2nd

== World Championship results ==
Year	Age	Slalom	Giant slalom	Super-G	Downhill	Combined	Parallel	Team event
2011	21	—	DNF2	14	—	—	—N/a	—
2013	23	injured: did not compete						
2015	25	—	19	—	—	—	—N/a	—
2017	27	—	DNF1	—	—	—	—N/a	—
2019	29	—	12	—	—	—	—N/a	—
2021	31	injured: did not compete						
2023	33	—	DNF2	—	—	—	—	1

== Olympic results ==
Year	Age	Slalom	Giant slalom	Super-G	Downhill	Combined	Team event
2010	20	—	26	—	—	—	—N/a
2014	24	injured: did not compete					—N/a
2018	28	—	20	—	—	—	—
2022	32	—	12	—	—	—	4
