= 2020 Alpine Skiing World Cup – Men's parallel =

Alpine ski discipline year standings

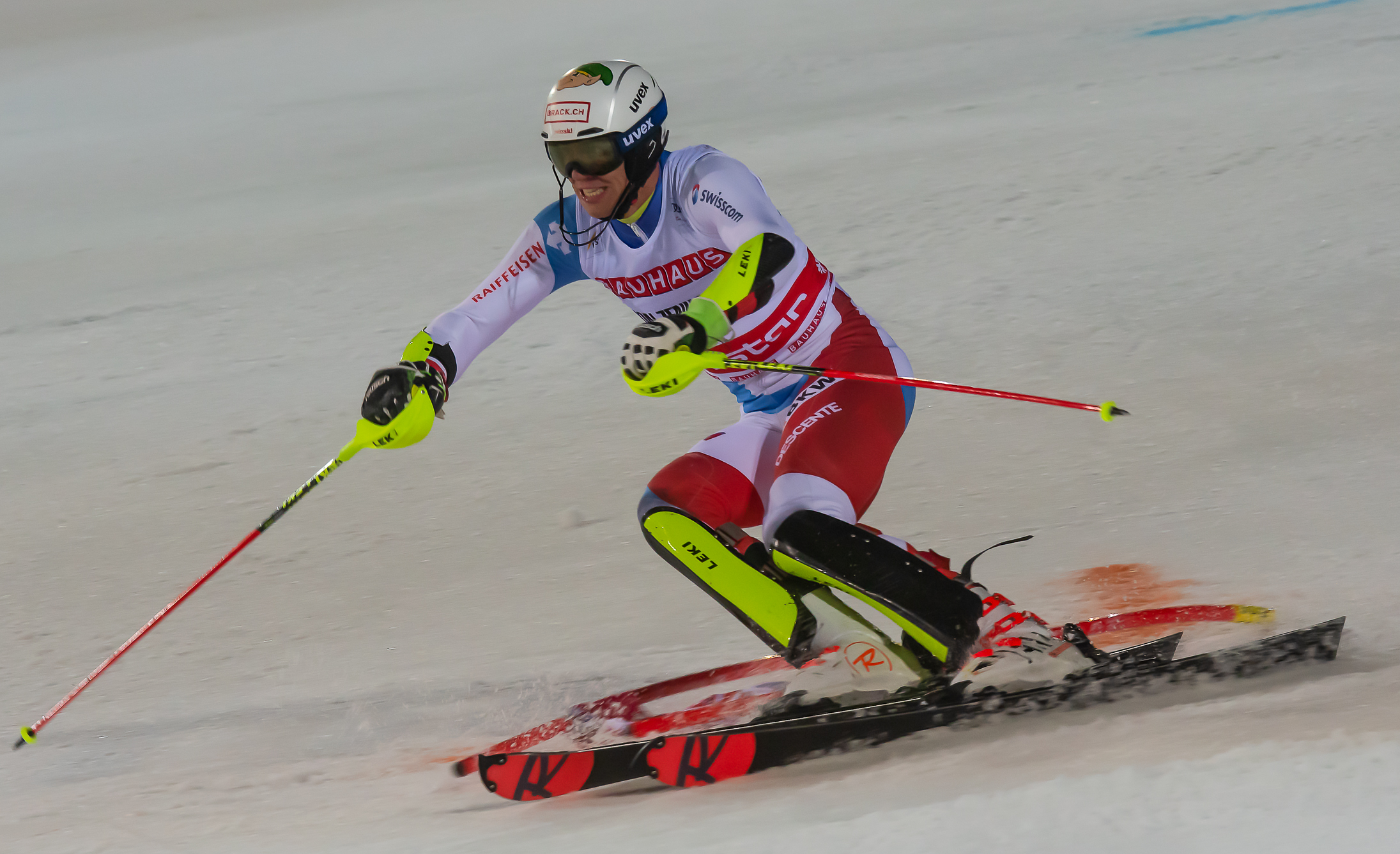
2020 men's parallel World Cup: Loïc Meillard of Switzerland, season champion; 2020 men's World Cup; overall • downhill • super-g; giant slalom • slalom; combined • Parallel
Previous: 2019	Next: 2021

The men's parallel competition in the 2020 FIS Alpine Skiing World Cup was contested as a World Cup discipline separate from slalom for the first time in 2020. Prior to the season, FIS decided to combine parallel skiing events (including all of parallel giant slalom, parallel slalom, and city events (parallel slaloms held on courses built within cities)) into a new discipline, joining the existing disciplines of downhill, Super-G, giant slalom, slalom, and combined. The discipline winner would receive a small crystal globe, similar to the other disciplines. However, at the same time, FIS decided to drop the city events to reduce the amount of travel required during the World Cup season, planning to replace them with more parallel events at regular venues.

The parallel format was also changed to make the race more TV-friendly. Parallel races now began with one classic qualification run to determine the top 32, who advanced to the elimination phase of the main competition. The round of 32 used the existing run and re-run format, so that each competitor got to start from each side, but from the round of 16 forward, there was only one run per race and a direct knockout system—the loser of each race was gone. However, the new format immediately became controversial, as making two giant slalom courses equal in a single-run format proved close to impossible, and the first men's parallel giant slalom races suffered from "the luck of the draw" becoming determinative: all eight round-of-16 matches were won by the racer on the same randomly-selected course.

Ultimately, only two parallel events, both parallel giant slaloms, were scheduled and held in the 2019–20 season. Swiss skier Loïc Meillard won the second event and also won the first-ever discipline championship for men in parallel. At this time, individual parallel races were not included in the season finals, which were scheduled in 2020 for Cortina d'Ampezzo, Italy but were cancelled due to the COVID-19 pandemic.

== Standings ==
#	Skier	23 Dec 2019; Alta Badia (Italy); PG	09 Feb 2020; Chamonix (France); PG	Total
	(Switzerland) Loïc Meillard	29	100	129
2	(Norway) Rasmus Windingstad	100	3	103
3	(Germany) Stefan Luitz	80	2	82
4	(Switzerland) Thomas Tumler	DNQ	80	80
5	(Austria) Roland Leitinger	60	13	73
	(Germany) Alexander Schmid	13	60	73
7	(France) Thibaut Favrot	26	40	66
8	(Norway) Henrik Kristoffersen	36	26	62
9	(Norway) Leif Kristian Nestvold-Haugen	50	11	61
10	(Slovenia) Žan Kranjec	14	45	59
	(Norway) Lucas Braathen	45	14	59
12	(United States) Tommy Ford	8	50	58
13	(Norway) Aleksander Aamodt Kilde	20	36	56
14	(Sweden) Mattias Rönngren	40	DNS	40
15	(Italy) Simon Maurberger	2	32	34
16	(Switzerland) Justin Murisier	32	DNS	32
17	(Austria) Fabio Gstrein	DNS	29	29
18	(Croatia) Filip Zubčić	6	22	28
19	(France) Alexis Pinturault	5	20	25
	(Russia) Pavel Trikhichev	15	10	25
21	(Italy) Luca De Aliprandini	DNQ	24	24
	(Austria) Dominik Raschner	24	DNS	24
	(France) Mathieu Faivre	16	8	24
24	(United States) Ryan Cochran-Siegle	22	DNS	22
25	(Italy) Giovanni Borsotti	DNS	18	18
	(United States) River Radamus	18	DNS	18
	References			

- Winner
- 2nd place
- 3rd place
- DNS = Did not start
- DNQ = Did not qualify
- Updated at 21 March 2020, after all events.

== See also ==
- 2020 Alpine Skiing World Cup – Men's summary rankings
- 2020 Alpine Skiing World Cup – Men's overall
- 2020 Alpine Skiing World Cup – Men's downhill
- 2020 Alpine Skiing World Cup – Men's super-G
- 2020 Alpine Skiing World Cup – Men's giant slalom
- 2020 Alpine Skiing World Cup – Men's slalom
- 2020 Alpine Skiing World Cup – Men's combined
- World Cup scoring system
