= Aleksander Aamodt Kilde =

Norwegian World Cup alpine ski racer

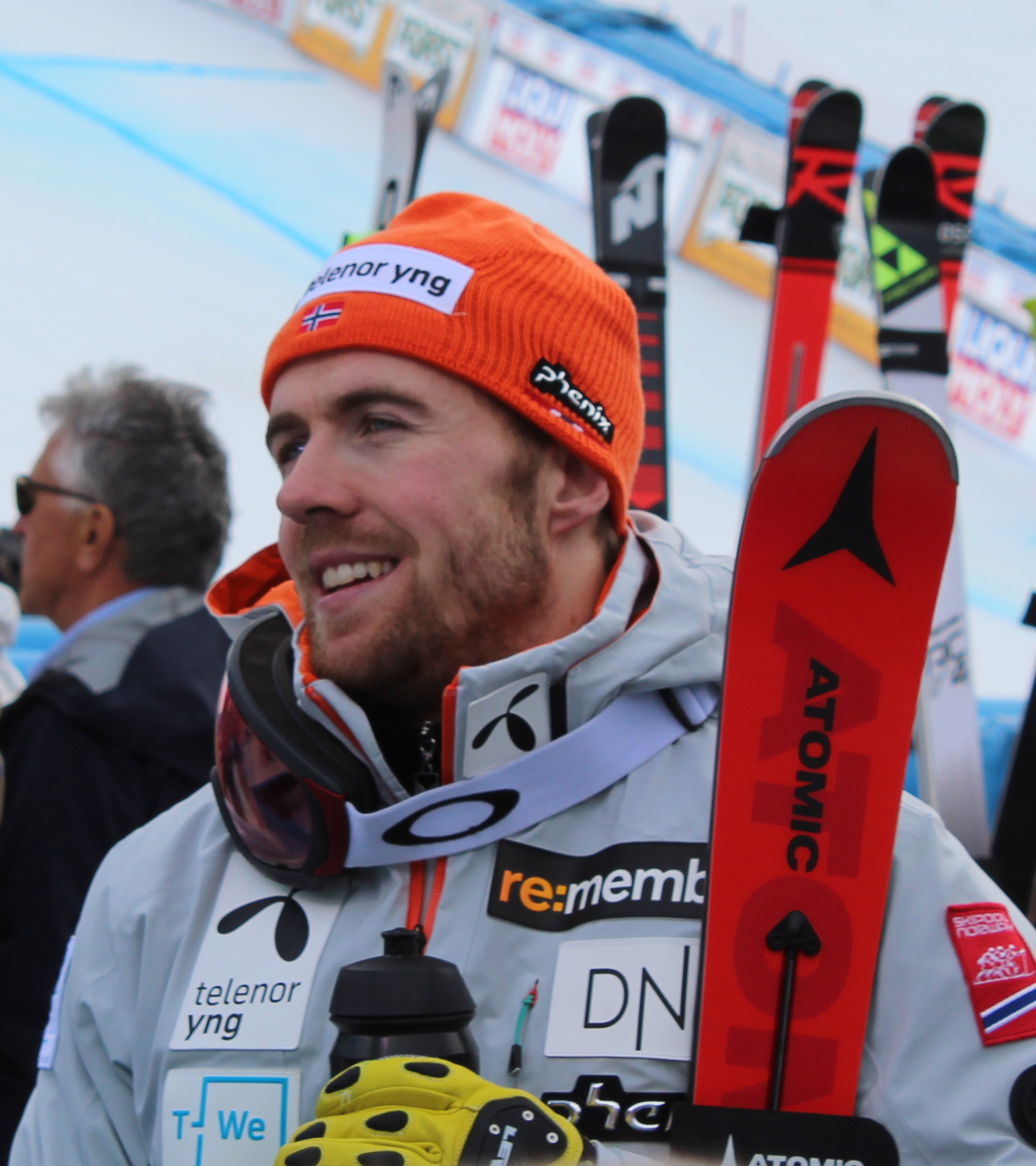
- Kilde in 2019

Personal information
- Born: 21 September 1992 (age 33) Bærum, Akershus, Norway
- Height: 1.81 m (5 ft 11 in)

Skiing career
- Sport: Alpine skiing
- Club: Lommedalens IL
- Disciplines: Downhill, Super-G, Giant slalom, combined
- World Cup debut: 28 October 2012 (age 20)

Olympics
- Teams: 3 – (2014, 2018, 2022)
- Medals: 2 (0 gold)

World Championships
- Teams: 4 – (2015–2019, 2023)
- Medals: 2

World Cup
- Seasons: 13 – (2013–2024, 2026)
- Wins: 21 – (12 DH, 9 SG)
- Podiums: 48 – (20 DH, 24 SG, 1 GS, 3 AC)
- Overall titles: 1 – (2020)
- Discipline titles: 4 – (2 SG, 2 DH)
Medal record
Men's alpine skiing
Representing Norway
World Cup race podiums
Event	1st	2nd	3rd
Giant slalom	0	1	0
Super-G	9	7	8
Downhill	12	5	3
Combined	0	1	2
Total	21	14	13
International competitions
Event	1st	2nd	3rd
Olympic Games	0	1	1
World Championships	0	2	0
Junior World Championships	1	0	0
Total	1	3	1
Olympic Games
Silver medal – second place	2022 Beijing	Combined
Bronze medal – third place	2022 Beijing	Super-G
World Championships
Silver medal – second place	2023 Courchevel	Downhill
Silver medal – second place	2023 Courchevel	Super-G
Junior World Championships
Gold medal – first place	2013 Mont-Sainte-Anne	Giant slalom

Aleksander Aamodt Kilde (born 21 September 1992) is a Norwegian World Cup alpine ski racer. He competes in four events, with a main focus on super-G and downhill. Kilde hails from Bærum and represents the sports club Lommedalens IL.

== Career ==
Kilde became junior world champion in giant slalom in 2013 at Mont-Sainte-Anne, Quebec, Canada, and won the European Cup overall title that season. He also finished second in the super-G at the Norwegian national championships, setting a time 0.11 of a second behind winner Aksel Lund Svindal. He made his World Cup debut in October 2012 and has competed on the circuit since the 2014 season.

Kilde represented Norway in the 2014 Winter Olympics in Sochi, Russia, and was 13th in the super-G at Rosa Khutor, but did not finish in the downhill nor the combination, where he placed fourth in the downhill portion of the combined.

He gained his first World Cup podium in a super-G at Val Gardena in December 2015. It was a third place in a Norwegian sweep, following teammates Aksel Lund Svindal and Kjetil Jansrud.

Kilde won the 2019–20 World Cup overall title, after the retirement of Marcel Hirscher with eight consecutive. Despite winning two races in Val Gardena in December 2020, he failed to defend the title due to a season-ending injury in January.

The following 2021/22 season, though, saw Kilde reach a personal best number of podiums within one season: seven wins and two 2nd places. He won the super-G globe for the second time in his career and also celebrated his first Downhill globe. In the 2022 Winter Olympics, Kilde won two medals, a bronze from super-G and a surprise silver from alpine combined. He also finished fifth in the downhill.

In January 2024, Kilde sustained a severe cut and nerve damage in his right calf, along with two torn ligaments in his shoulder in a crash during a downhill race in Wengen, Switzerland. He returned to skiing that summer but suffered a set back due to an infection in his shoulder, announcing that he wouldn’t compete the following season. In February 2025, surgeons repaired his shoulder using a strand of muscle from his hamstring. He qualified for the 2026 Winter Olympics but withdrew.

== World Cup results ==
=== Season titles ===
Season	
Season	Discipline
2016	Super-G
2020	Overall
2022	Downhill
2022	Super-G
2023	Downhill

=== Season standings ===
Season
Season	Age	Overall	Slalom	Giant; Slalom	Super-G	Downhill	Combined	Parallel
2014	21	80	—	—	29	55	39	—N/a
2015	22	75	—	—	26	48	—	—N/a
2016	23	7	—	36	1	12	16	—N/a
2017	24	7	36	29	3	13	3	—N/a
2018	25	15	—	19	12	14	15	—N/a
2019	26	8	—	30	5	4	26	—N/a
2020	27	1	—	8	3	4	2	13
2021 ^	28	11	—	17	5	8	—N/a	14
2022	29	2	—	35	1	1	—N/a	—
2023	30	2	—	25	2	1	—N/a	—N/a
2024 ^	31	14	—	23	16	7	—N/a	—N/a
2025	32	injured: did not compete					—N/a	—N/a
2026	33	101	—	—	45	41	—N/a	—N/a

Standings through 28 February 2026
^ Injured in mid-January, out for the rest of the season

=== Race victories ===
- 21 wins – (12 DH, 9 SG)
- 48 podiums – (20 DH, 24 SG, 1 GS, 3 AC)

Season	Date	Location	Discipline
2016	30 Jan 2016	Garmisch-Partenkirchen, Germany	Downhill
2016	27 Feb 2016	Hinterstoder, Austria	Super-G
2019	15 Dec 2018	Val Gardena, Italy	Downhill
2020	14 Feb 2020	Saalbach-Hinterglemm, Austria	Super-G
2021	18 Dec 2020	Val Gardena, Italy	Super-G
2021	19 Dec 2020	Val Gardena, Italy	Downhill
2022 7 wins (4 SG, 3 DH)	3 Dec 2021	(United States) Beaver Creek, USA	Super-G
2022 7 wins (4 SG, 3 DH)	4 Dec 2021	(United States) Beaver Creek, USA	Downhill
2022 7 wins (4 SG, 3 DH)	17 Dec 2021	Val Gardena, Italy	Super-G
2022 7 wins (4 SG, 3 DH)	29 Dec 2021	Bormio, Italy	Super-G
2022 7 wins (4 SG, 3 DH)	14 Jan 2022	Wengen, Switzerland	Downhill
2022 7 wins (4 SG, 3 DH)	21 Jan 2022	Kitzbühel, Austria	Downhill
2022 7 wins (4 SG, 3 DH)	6 Mar 2022	Kvitfjell, Norway	Super-G
2023 8 wins (6 DH, 2 SG)	26 Nov 2022	Lake Louise, Canada	Downhill
2023 8 wins (6 DH, 2 SG)	3 Dec 2022	(United States) Beaver Creek, USA	Downhill
2023 8 wins (6 DH, 2 SG)	4 Dec 2022	(United States) Beaver Creek, USA	Super-G
2023 8 wins (6 DH, 2 SG)	17 Dec 2022	Val Gardena, Italy	Downhill
2023 8 wins (6 DH, 2 SG)	13 Jan 2023	Wengen, Switzerland	Super-G
2023 8 wins (6 DH, 2 SG)	14 Jan 2023	Wengen, Switzerland	Downhill
2023 8 wins (6 DH, 2 SG)	21 Jan 2023	Kitzbühel, Austria	Downhill
2023 8 wins (6 DH, 2 SG)	4 Mar 2023	(United States) Aspen, USA	Downhill

=== Podium summary ===
Season	Podiums															
Season	Downhill			Super G			Giant Slalom			Combined			Total			
Season	1st place, gold medalist(s)	2nd place, silver medalist(s)	3rd place, bronze medalist(s)	1st place, gold medalist(s)	2nd place, silver medalist(s)	3rd place, bronze medalist(s)	1st place, gold medalist(s)	2nd place, silver medalist(s)	3rd place, bronze medalist(s)	1st place, gold medalist(s)	2nd place, silver medalist(s)	3rd place, bronze medalist(s)	1st place, gold medalist(s)	2nd place, silver medalist(s)	3rd place, bronze medalist(s)	Σ
2016	1			1	1	1							2	1	1	4
2017					1	1						1		1	2	3
2018																
2019	1		1			2							1		3	4
2020		2		1	2						1	1	1	5	1	7
2021	1			1									2			2
2022	3	1		4	1								7	2		9
2023	6		1	2	2	2							8	2	3	13
2024		2	1			2		1						3	3	6

== World Championship results ==
Year
Year	Age	Slalom	Giant; Slalom	Super-G	Downhill	Combined
2015	22	—	—	19	26	8
2017	24	—	DNF1	4	6	4
2019	26	—	—	24	8	22
2023	30	—	DNF1	2	2	DNS2

== Olympic results ==
Year
Year	Age	Slalom	Giant; Slalom	Super-G	Downhill	Combined
2014	21	—	—	13	DNF	DNF2
2018	25	—	—	13	15	21
2022	29	—	—	3	5	2

== Personal life ==
Although his middle name is derived from his mother's maiden name, he is not related to fellow Norwegian alpine racer Kjetil André Aamodt.

Kilde has been in a relationship with American alpine skier and fellow overall World Cup winner Mikaela Shiffrin since early 2021. They announced their engagement on April 4, 2024.
