= Gino Caviezel =

Swiss alpine skier (born 1992)

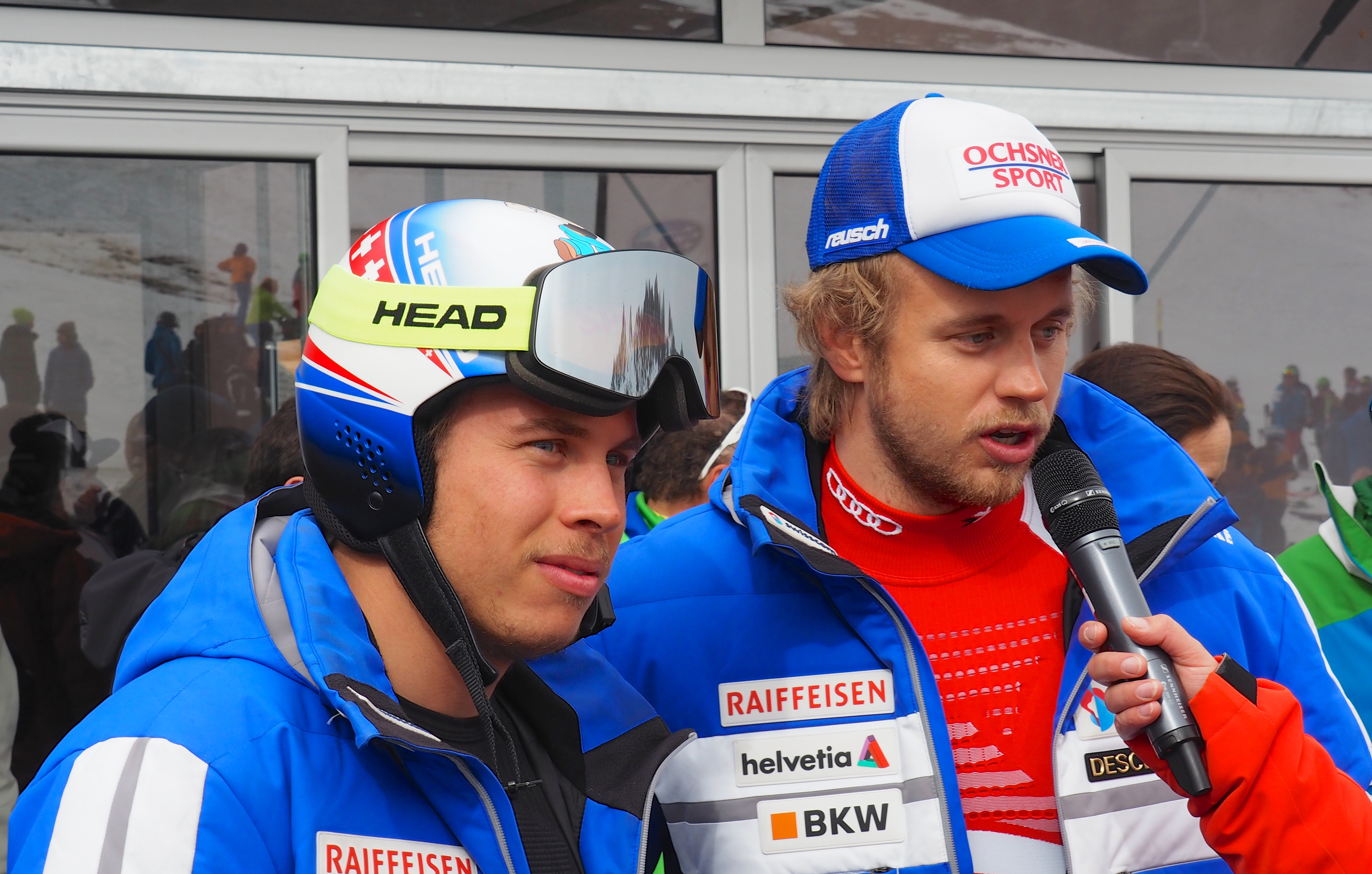
- Gino and Mauro Caviezel in 2016

Personal information
- Born: 23 June 1992 (age 34) Tomils, Graubünden, Switzerland
- Height: 1.73 m (5 ft 8 in)

Skiing career
- Sport: Alpine skiing
- Club: Beverin
- Disciplines: Giant slalom, super-G, combined
- World Cup debut: 18 December 2011 (age 19)

Olympics
- Teams: 3 – (2014, 2018, 2022)
- Medals: 0

World Championships
- Teams: 6 – (2013–2023)
- Medals: 0

World Cup
- Seasons: 12 – (2012–2023)
- Wins: 0
- Podiums: 3 – (2 GS, 1 SG)
- Overall titles: 0 – (13th in 2022)
- Discipline titles: 0 – (8th in GS, 2023)
Medal record
Men's alpine skiing
Representing Switzerland
Junior World Championships
Silver medal – second place	2013 Quebec	Combined

Gino Caviezel (born 23 June 1992) is a Swiss World Cup alpine ski racer from Tomils, Graubünden. He specializes in the giant slalom and competed for Switzerland in three Winter Olympics and six World Championships. He is the younger brother of alpine ski racer Mauro Caviezel.

== World Cup results ==
=== Season standings ===
Season	Age	Overall	Slalom	Giant slalom	Super-G	Downhill	Combined
2013	20	103	—	35	—	—	—
2014	21	106	—	34	—	—	—
2015	22	53	—	13	—	—	—
2016	23	67	—	22	—	—	—
2017	24	72	—	22	—	—	—
2018	25	80	—	26	—	—	—
2019	26	48	—	17	53	—	27
2020	27	32	—	14	25	—	15
2021	28	21	—	12	25	—	—N/a
2022	29	16	—	10	11	—	—N/a
2023	30	13	—	8	11	—	—N/a
2024	31	27	—	13	22	—	—N/a
2025	32	25	—	15	21	—	—N/a

Standings through 30 December 2024

=== Race podiums ===
- 0 wins
- 3 podiums – (2 GS, 1 SG); 40 top tens

Season	Date	Location	Discipline	Place
2021	18 Oct 2020	Sölden, Austria	Giant slalom	3rd
2022	17 Mar 2022	Courchevel, France	Super-G	3rd
2023	25 Jan 2023	Schladming, Austria	Giant slalom	2nd

== World Championship results ==
Year	Age	Slalom	Giant slalom	Super-G	Downhill	Combined
2013	20	—	15	—	—	—
2015	22	—	25	—	—	—
2017	24	—	15	—	—	—
2019	26	—	DNF1	—	—	—
2021	28	—	DNF1	—	—	DNF2
2023	30	—	9	DNF	—	—

== Olympic results ==
Year	Age	Slalom	Giant slalom	Super-G	Downhill	Combined
2014	21	—	30	—	—	—
2018	25	—	15	—	—	—
2022	29	—	8	16	—	—
