= Žan Kranjec =

Slovenian alpine skier (born 1992)

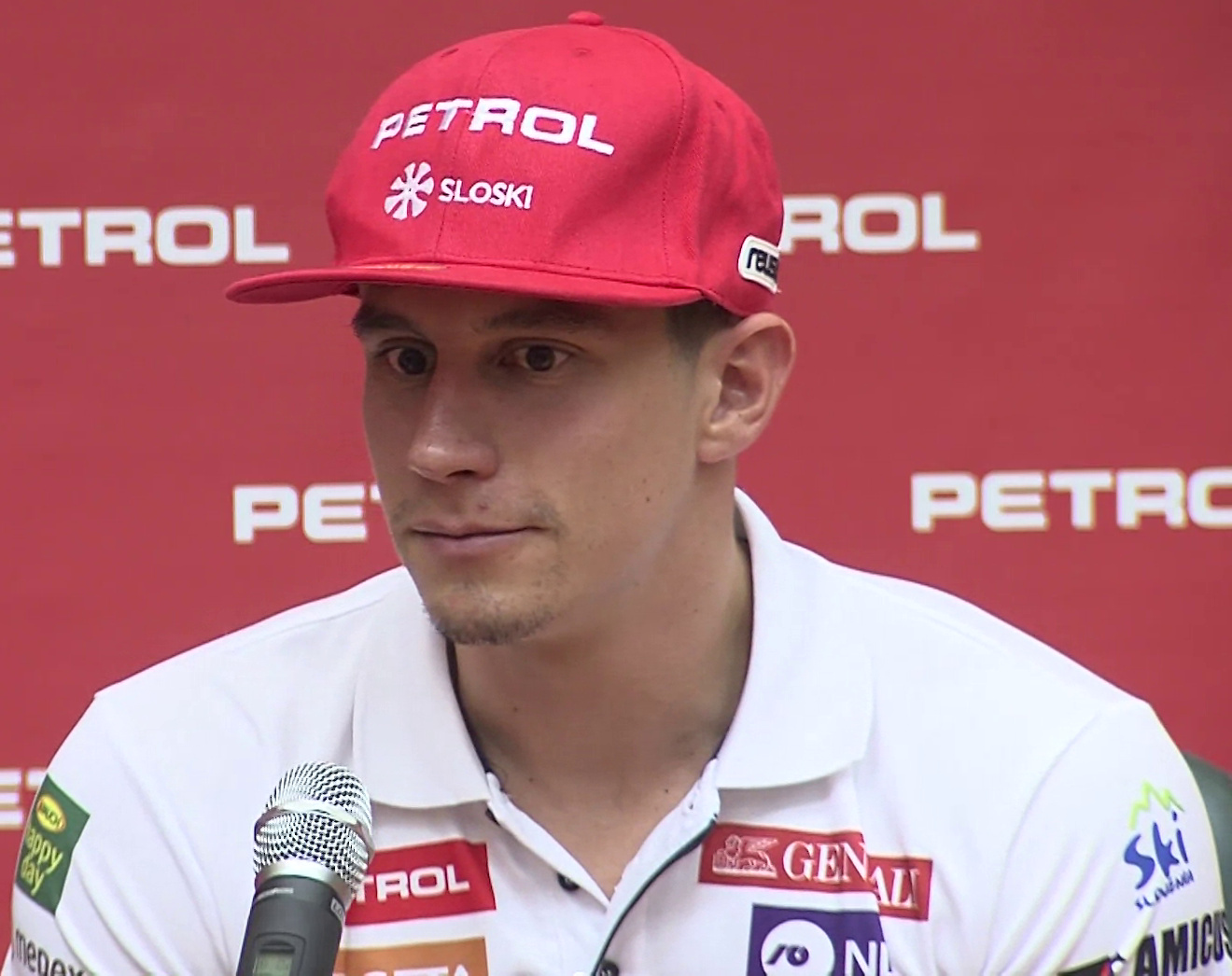
- Kranjec in 2018

Personal information
- Born: 15 November 1992 (age 33) Ljubljana, Slovenia
- Height: 1.76 m (5 ft 9 in)
- Website: zankranjec.si

Skiing career
- Country: Slovenia
- Sport: Alpine skiing
- Club: SD Novinar
- Disciplines: Giant slalom, slalom
- World Cup debut: 5 March 2011 (age 18)

Olympics
- Teams: 4 – (2014–2026)
- Medals: 1 (0 gold)

World Championships
- Teams: 7 – (2013–2025)
- Medals: 0

World Cup
- Seasons: 16 – (2011–2026)
- Wins: 2 – (2 GS)
- Podiums: 15 – (15 GS)
- Overall titles: 0 – (11th in 2023)
- Discipline titles: 0 – (3rd in GS, 2023)
Medal record
Men's alpine skiing
Representing Slovenia
Olympic Games
Silver medal – second place	2022 Beijing	Giant slalom
Junior World Championships
Gold medal – first place	2012 Roccaraso	Team
Bronze medal – third place	2013 Quebec	Giant slalom
Bronze medal – third place	2012 Roccaraso	Giant slalom
Bronze medal – third place	2012 Roccaraso	Combined

Žan Kranjec (born 15 November 1992) is a World Cup alpine ski racer from Slovenia, and primarily competes in the technical events of giant slalom and slalom. At the 2022 Winter Olympics, Kranjec won a silver medal in the giant slalom.

== Career ==
Kranjec made his World Cup debut at age 18 in March 2011 at Kranjska Gora. He represented Slovenia at the World Championships in 2013 and was 22nd in giant slalom. A week later at the Junior World Championships in Canada, he won a bronze medal in giant slalom.

At the 2018 Winter Olympics, Kranjec placed fourth in the giant slalom. In December 2018, he gained his first World Cup win in Saalbach, Austria. Through December 2023, Kranjec has two World Cup wins and thirteen podiums.

At the 2022 Winter Olympics, Kranjec was eighth after the first run of the giant slalom, then was the fastest in the second run to win the silver medal, runner-up to Marco Odermatt.

== World Cup results ==
=== Season standings ===
Season
Season	Age	Overall	Slalom	Giant slalom	Super-G	Downhill	Combined	Parallel
2014	21	129	—	46	—	—	—	—N/a
2015	22	121	—	37	—	—	—	—N/a
2016	23	79	—	26	—	—	—	—N/a
2017	24	49	61	14	—	—	—	—N/a
2018	25	33	—	6	—	—	—	—N/a
2019	26	22	34	4	—	—	—	—N/a
2020	27	16	48	4	—	—	—	10
2021	28	32	—	7	—	—	—N/a	25
2022	29	37	48	11	—	—	—N/a	10
2023	30	11	—	3	—	—	—N/a	—N/a
2024	31	19	—	5	—	—	—N/a	—N/a
2025	32	31	—	8	—	—	—N/a	—N/a
2026	33	46	—	15	—	—	—N/a	—N/a

=== Race podiums ===
- 2 wins – (2 GS)
- 15 podiums – (15 GS), 53 top tens

Season
Season	Date	Location	Discipline	Place
2018	17 December 2017	Alta Badia, Italy	Giant slalom	3rd
2019	19 December 2018	Saalbach, Austria	Giant slalom	1st
2019	16 March 2019	Soldeu, Andorra	Giant slalom	3rd
2020	27 October 2019	Sölden, Austria	Giant slalom	3rd
2020	22 December 2019	Alta Badia, Italy	Giant slalom	3rd
2020	11 January 2020	Adelboden, Switzerland	Giant slalom	1st
2021	5 December 2020	Santa Caterina, Italy	Giant slalom	2nd
2022	24 Octember 2021	Sölden, Austria	Giant slalom	3rd
2023	23 October 2022	Sölden, Austria	Giant slalom	2nd
2023	10 December 2022	Val d'Isère, France	Giant slalom	3rd
2023	19 December 2022	Alta Badia, Italy	Giant slalom	3rd
2024	17 December 2023	Alta Badia, Italy	Giant slalom	3rd
2024	18 December 2023	Alta Badia, Italy	Giant slalom	3rd
2024	23 January 2024	Schladming, Austria	Giant slalom	3rd
2025	8 December 2024	Beaver Creek, United States	Giant slalom	3rd

== World Championship results ==
Year
Year	Age	Slalom	Giant slalom	Super-G	Downhill	Combined	Team combined	Parallel	Team event
2013	20	—	22	—	—	—	—N/a	—N/a	—N/a
2015	22	32	DNF1	—	—	—	—N/a	—N/a	—N/a
2017	24	DNS2	DNF1	—	—	—	—N/a	—N/a	—
2019	26	17	5	—	—	—	—N/a	—N/a	—
2021	28	—	6	—	—	—	—N/a	10	—
2023	30	DNF1	6	—	—	—	—N/a	4	—
2025	32	—	11	—	—	—N/a	—	—N/a	—

== Olympic results ==
Year
Year	Age	Slalom	Giant slalom	Super-G	Downhill	Combined	Team combined	Team event
2014	21	DNF1	23	—	—	—	—N/a	—N/a
2018	25	—	4	—	—	—	—N/a	9
2022	29	—	2	—	—	—	—N/a	7
2026	33	—	12	—	—	—N/a	—	—N/a
