= FIS Alpine World Ski Championships 2019 – Men's giant slalom =

Men's giant slalom at the FIS Alpine World Ski Championships 2019
- Venue: Åre ski resort
- Location: Åre, Sweden
- Dates: 15 February
- Competitors: 98 from 55 nations
- Winning time: 2:20.24

Medalists
gold medal	Henrik Kristoffersen	Norway
silver medal	Marcel Hirscher	Austria
bronze medal	Alexis Pinturault	France

The Men's giant slalom competition at the FIS Alpine World Ski Championships 2019 was held on 15 February 2019. A qualification was held on 14 February 2019.

== Results ==
=== Final ===
The first run started at 14:15 and the second run at 17:45.

Rank	Bib	Name	Nation	Run 1	Rank	Run 2	Rank	Total	Diff
1st place, gold medalist(s)	1	Henrik Kristoffersen	Norway	1:10.15	3	1:10.09	5	2:20.24	
2nd place, silver medalist(s)	5	Marcel Hirscher	Austria	1:10.07	2	1:10.37	10	2:20.44	+0.20
3rd place, bronze medalist(s)	2	Alexis Pinturault	France	1:09.97	1	1:10.69	19	2:20.66	+0.42
4	6	Loïc Meillard	Switzerland	1:10.72	5	1:10.44	14	2:21.16	+0.92
5	16	Marco Schwarz	Austria	1:11.68	16	1:09.60	1	2:21.28	+1.04
5	3	Žan Kranjec	Slovenia	1:10.81	6	1:10.47	15	2:21.28	+1.04
7	9	Leif Kristian Nestvold-Haugen	Norway	1:11.35	10	1:09.97	3	2:21.32	+1.08
8	23	Alexander Schmid	Germany	1:10.89	7	1:10.54	16	2:21.43	+1.19
9	30	Stefan Brennsteiner	Austria	1:11.41	12	1:10.21	7	2:21.62	+1.38
11	22	Marco Odermatt	Switzerland	1:11.23	8	1:10.40	11	2:21.63	+1.39
11	10	Ted Ligety	United States	1:11.55	13	1:10.23	8	2:21.78	+1.54
12	14	Tommy Ford	United States	1:11.40	11	1:10.40	12	2:21.80	+1.56
13	25	Rasmus Windingstad	Norway	1:11.64	15	1:10.20	6	2:21.84	+1.60
14	12	Victor Muffat-Jeandet	France	1:11.92	19	1:10.04	4	2:21.96	+1.72
15	15	Manuel Feller	Austria	1:11.79	17	1:10.42	13	2:22.21	+1.97
16	7	Matts Olsson	Sweden	1:11.58	14	1:10.66	17	2:22.24	+2.00
17	13	Mathieu Faivre	France	1:11.34	9	1:10.91	21	2:22.25	+2.01
18	29	Trevor Philp	Canada	1:12.95	24	1:09.77	2	2:22.72	+2.48
19	24	Filip Zubčić	Croatia	1:12.70	22	1:10.35	9	2:23.05	+2.81
20	8	Luca De Aliprandini	Italy	1:11.89	18	1:11.44	27	2:23.33	+3.09
21	27	Ryan Cochran-Siegle	United States	1:12.47	20	1:11.41	26	2:23.88	+3.64
22	36	Štefan Hadalin	Slovenia	1:12.64	21	1:11.29	25	2:23.93	+3.69
23	35	Simon Maurberger	Italy	1:13.30	28	1:10.68	18	2:23.98	+3.74
24	49	Tomoya Ishii	Japan	1:13.42	30	1:10.78	20	2:24.20	+3.96
25	42	Samu Torsti	Finland	1:13.12	26	1:11.21	23	2:24.33	+4.09
26	33	Sam Maes	Belgium	1:13.33	29	1:11.01	22	2:24.34	+4.10
27	34	Pavel Trikhichev	Russia	1:13.13	27	1:11.68	28	2:24.81	+4.57
28	40	Maarten Meiners	Netherlands	1:14.09	33	1:11.23	24	2:25.32	+5.08
29	46	Albert Popov	Bulgaria	1:14.56	36	1:12.02	29	2:26:58	+6.34
30	43	Simon Fournier	Canada	1:13.89	31	1:12.79	31	2:26.68	+6.44
31	54	Jan Zabystřan	Czech Republic	1:14.75	37	1:12:45	30	2:27.20	+6.96
32	61	Daniel Paulus	Czech Republic	1:14.30	34	1:12.96	32	2:27.26	+7.02
33	55	Juan del Campo	Spain	1:14.83	39	1:13.42	33	2:28.25	+8.01
34	37	Willis Feasey	New Zealand	1:14.81	38	1:13.71	34	2:28.52	+8.28
35	75	Yoan Todorov	Bulgaria	1:16.30	45	1:14.58	35	2:30.88	+10.64
36	48	Adam Barwood	New Zealand	1:16.40	46	1:14.85	36	2:31.25	+11.01
37	63	Elias Kolega	Croatia	1:16.84	50	1:15.03	37	2:31.87	+11.63
38	68	Samuel Kolega	Croatia	1:16.74	47	1:15.22	38	2:31.96	+11.72
39	74	Zaks Gedra	Latvia	1:18.32	53	1:15.44	39	2:33.76	+13.52
40	69	Sven von Appen	Chile	1:18.15	52	1:16.26	40	2:34.41	+14.17
41	71	Andrej Drukarov	Lithuania	1:18.82	54	1:17.23	41	2:36.05	+15.81
42	81	Eldar Salihović	Montenegro	1:20.32	59	1:18.45	42	2:38.77	+18.53
43	79	Nikolaos Tziovas	Greece	1:20.08	56	1:18.77	43	2:38.85	+18.61
44	78	Benjamin Szollos	Israel	1:20.23	58	1:18.83	44	2:39.05	+18.81
45	73	Casper Dyrbye Næsted	Denmark	1:20.65	60	1:19.21	45	2:39.86	+19.62
46	95	Komiljon Tukhtaev	Uzbekistan	1:19.97	55	1:20.02	46	2:39.99	+19.75
—	4	Thomas Fanara	France	1:10.39	4	Did not finish			
—	28	Roland Leitinger	Austria	1:12.73	23	Did not finish			
—	38	Charlie Raposo	Great Britain	1:14.05	32	Did not finish			
—	45	Aleksandr Andrienko	Russia	1:14.38	35	Did not finish			
—	41	Arttu Niemela	Finland	1:14.83	39	Did not finish			
—	50	Ian Gut	Liechtenstein	1:15.36	41	Did not finish			
—	65	Dries Van den Broecke	Belgium	1:15.60	42	Did not finish			
—	31	Adam Žampa	Slovakia	1:15.79	43	Did not finish			
—	39	Andreas Žampa	Slovakia	1:16.02	44	Did not finish			
—	64	Leon Nikić	Croatia	1:16.75	48	Did not finish			
—	62	Tomas Birkner De Miguel	Argentina	1:17.30	51	Did not finish			
—	85	Daniil Chertsin	Belarus	1:20.16	57	Did not finish			
—	18	Manfred Mölgg	Italy	1:13.10	25	Did not start			
—	67	Matej Falat	Slovakia	1:16.82	49	Did not start			
—	84	Matthieu Osch	Luxembourg	1:21.23	61	Did not qualify			
—	80	Michael Poettoz	Colombia	1:21.99	62	Did not qualify			
—	83	Luka Bozhinovski	North Macedonia	1:22.35	63	Did not qualify			
—	87	Alexandru Barbu	Romania	1:22.74	64	Did not qualify			
—	93	Albin Tahiri	KOS	1:23.03	65	Did not qualify			
—	92	Ivan Kovbasnyuk	Ukraine	1:23.25	66	Did not qualify			
—	86	Zakhar Kuchin	Kazakhstan	1:23.86	67	Did not qualify			
—	94	Zhang Yangming	China	1:25.39	68	Did not qualify			
—	91	Evgeniy Timofeev	Kyrgyzstan	1:25.75	69	Did not qualify			
—	89	Pouria Saveh-Shemshaki	Iran	1:26.86	70	Did not qualify			
—	97	Giorgos Kakkouras	Cyprus	1:28.07	71	Did not qualify			
—	98	Naim Fenianos	Lebanon	1:29.09	72	Did not qualify			
—	96	Samuel Almeida	Portugal	1:29.93	73	Did not qualify			
—	90	Bence Nagy	Hungary	Did not finish					
—	88	Cormac Comerford	Ireland	Did not finish					
—	82	Strahinja Stanišić	Serbia	Did not finish					
—	77	Aleksi Beniaidze	Georgia	Did not finish					
—	76	Emir Lokmić	Bosnia and Herzegovina	Did not finish					
—	72	Simon Breitfuss Kammerlander	Bolivia	Did not finish					
—	70	Sturla Snær Snorrason	Iceland	Did not finish					
—	66	Matej Prieložný	Slovakia	Did not finish					
—	60	Elian Lehto	Finland	Did not finish					
—	59	Alejandro Puente Tasias	Spain	Did not finish					
—	58	Carl Jonsson	Sweden	Did not finish					
—	57	Axel Esteve	Andorra	Did not finish					
—	56	Miha Hrobat	Slovenia	Did not finish					
—	53	Ivan Kuznetsov	Russia	Did not finish					
—	52	Axel Lindqvist	Sweden	Did not finish					
—	47	Harry Laidlaw	Australia	Did not finish					
—	44	Mattias Rönngren	Sweden	Did not finish					
—	32	Brian McLaughlin	United States	Did not finish					
—	26	Erik Read	Canada	Did not finish					
—	21	Riccardo Tonetti	Italy	Did not finish					
—	20	Thomas Tumler	Switzerland	Did not finish					
—	19	Gino Caviezel	Switzerland	Did not finish					
—	17	Aleksander Aamodt Kilde	Norway	Did not finish					
—	11	Stefan Luitz	Germany	Did not finish					
—	51	Jack Gower	Great Britain	Did not start					

=== Qualification ===
Rank	Bib	Name	Nation	Run 1	Rank	Run 2	Rank	Total	Diff	Notes
1	3	Axel Lindqvist	Sweden	1:04.72	1	1:07.33	14	2:12.05		Q
2	15	Elian Lehto	Finland	1:06.16	11	1:06.71	3	2:12.87	+0.82	Q
3	20	Matej Falat	Slovakia	1:06.21	12	1:06.72	4	2:12.93	+0.88	Q
4	7	Ivan Kuznetsov	Russia	1:06.00	6	1:06.94	8	2:12.94	+0.89	Q
5	10	Axel Esteve	Andorra	1:05.61	4	1:07.46	18	2:13.07	+1.02	Q
6	31	Zaks Gedra	Latvia	1:06.81	19	1:06.43	1	2:13.24	+1.19	Q
7	29	Klemen Kosi	Slovenia	1:06.15	10	1:07.11	11	2:13.26	+1.21	
8	47	Strahinja Stanišić	Serbia	1:06.82	20	1:06.47	2	2:13.29	+1.24	Q
9	17	Dries Van den Broecke	Belgium	1:05.37	2	1:07.94	25	2:13.31	+1.26	Q
10	21	Samuel Kolega	Croatia	1:06.53	16	1:06.81	5	2:13.34	+1.29	Q
11	19	Matej Prielozny	Slovakia	1:06.44	15	1:06.91	7	2:13.35	+1.30	Q
12	11	Carl Jonsson	Sweden	1:05.49	3	1:08.00	26	2:13.49	+1.44	Q
13	4	Jan Zabystřan	Czech Republic	1:06.07	8	1:07.56	20	2:13.63	+1.58	Q
14	6	Miha Hrobat	Slovenia	1:06.54	17	1:07.11	11	2:13.65	+1.60	Q
15	5	Juan del Campo	Spain	1:06.14	9	1:07.55	19	2:13.69	+1.64	Q
16	8	Alejandro Puente Tasias	Spain	1:06.34	14	1:07.42	15	2:13.76	+1.71	Q
17	13	Daniel Paulus	Czech Republic	1:06.01	7	1:07.78	24	2:13.79	+1.74	Q
18	32	Yoan Todorov	Bulgaria	1:07.17	25	1:06.89	6	2:14.06	+2.01	Q
19	16	Leon Nikić	Croatia	1:05.98	5	1:08.11	28	2:14.09	+2.04	Q
20	25	Sturla Snær Snorrason	Iceland	1:07.05	24	1:07.09	10	2:14.14	+2.09	Q
21	37	Benjamin Szollos	Israel	1:07.31	27	1:06.94	8	2:14.25	+2.20	Q
22	23	Sven von Appen	Chile	1:06.66	18	1:07.60	21	2:14.26	+2.21	Q
23	1	Jack Gower	Great Britain	1:06.23	13	1:08.11	28	2:14.34	+2.29	Q
24	14	Tomas Birkner de Miguel	Argentina	1:06.92	22	1:07.44	17	2:14.36	+2.31	Q
25	12	Elias Kolega	Croatia	1:06.82	20	1:07.65	22	2:14.47	+2.42	Q
26	18	Alec Scott	Australia	1:06.97	23	1:07.72	23	2:14.69	+2.64	
27	34	Aleksi Beniaidze	Georgia	1:07.56	28	1:07.14	13	2:14.70	+2.65	q
28	40	Soso Japharidze	Georgia	1:07.61	29	1:07.42	15	2:15.03	+2.98	
29	28	Casper Dyrbye Næsted	Denmark	1:07.26	26	1:08.36	30	2:15.62	+3.57	q
30	38	Iason Abramashvili	Georgia	1:07.83	34	1:08.06	27	2:15.89	+3.84	
31	9	Sebastiano Gastaldi	Argentina	1:07.63	30	1:08.38	31	2:16.01	+3.96	
32	71	Gísli Rafn Guðmundsson	Iceland	1:07.65	31	1:08.54	34	2:16.19	+4.14	
33	61	Elvis Opmanis	Latvia	1:08.25	38	1:08.39	32	2:16.64	+4.59	
34	53	Cormac Comerford	Ireland	1:07.82	33	1:09.07	36	2:16.89	+4.84	q
35	33	Emir Lokmić	Bosnia and Herzegovina	1:07.77	32	1:09.18	39	2:16.95	+4.90	q
36	26	Andrej Drukarov	Lithuania	1:08.25	38	1:08.94	35	2:17.19	+5.14	q
37	36	Marko Šljivić	Bosnia and Herzegovina	1:08.24	37	1:09.13	38	2:17.37	+5.32	
37	41	Miks Zvejnieks	Latvia	1:08.30	41	1:09.07	36	2:17.37	+5.32	
39	30	Itamar Biran	Israel	1:08.14	36	1:09.31	40	2:17.45	+5.40	
40	22	Cristian Javier Simari Birkner	Argentina	1:09.04	44	1:08.50	33	2:17.54	+5.49	
41	64	Sigurður Hauksson	Iceland	1:08.68	43	1:09.79	41	2:18.47	+6.42	
42	45	Eldar Salihović	Montenegro	1:08.61	42	1:10.31	44	2:18.92	+6.87	q
43	49	Matthieu Osch	Luxembourg	1:08.26	40	1:10.67	47	2:18.93	+6.88	q
44	48	Luka Bozhinovski	North Macedonia	1:09.66	52	1:10.01	42	2:19.67	+7.62	q
44	70	Ivan Kovbasnyuk	Ukraine	1:09.05	45	1:10.62	46	2:19.67	+7.62	q
46	44	Michael Poettoz	Colombia	1:09.33	50	1:10.43	45	2:19.76	+7.71	q
47	68	Besarion Japaridze	Georgia	1:09.08	46	1:10.71	48	2:19.79	+7.74	
48	75	Matyas Maroty	Hungary	1:09.22	48	1:10.90	50	2:20.12	+8.07	
49	35	Ioannis Antoniou	Greece	1:09.94	54	1:10.21	43	2:20.15	+8.10	
50	50	Daniil Chertsin	Belarus	1:09.52	51	1:10.97	51	2:20.49	+8.44	q
51	51	Zakhar Kuchin	Kazakhstan	1:10.06	57	1:10.72	49	2:20.78	+8.73	q
52	52	Alexandru Barbu	Romania	1:09.73	53	1:11.30	53	2:21.03	+8.98	q
53	74	Zhang Yangming	China	1:09.15	47	1:12.01	58	2:21.16	+9.11	q
54	78	Komiljon Tukhtaev	Uzbekistan	1:09.32	49	1:12.20	62	2:21.52	+9.47	q
55	98	Erjon Tola	Albania	1:10.36	62	1:11.20	52	2:21.56	+9.51	
56	69	Sergey Danov	Kazakhstan	1:10.09	58	1:11.67	56	2:21.76	+9.71	
57	73	Albin Tahiri	KOS	1:10.72	67	1:11.39	54	2:22.11	+10.06	q
58	82	Daniels Loss	Latvia	1:10.26	59	1:12.14	61	2:22.40	+10.35	
59	59	Mihajlo Đorđević	Serbia	1:10.54	65	1:12.09	59	2:22.63	+10.58	
60	54	Veselin Zlatković	Serbia	1:10.33	61	1:12.44	66	2:22.77	+10.72	
61	56	Pouria Saveh-Shemshaki	Iran	1:10.05	56	1:12.76	72	2:22.81	+10.76	q
62	86	Bastian Blåfalk	Denmark	1:10.66	66	1:12.20	62	2:22.86	+10.81	
63	63	Xu Mingfu	China	1:10.37	63	1:12.57	67	2:22.94	+10.89	
64	76	Levko Tsibelenko	Ukraine	1:10.27	60	1:12.71	71	2:22.98	+10.93	
65	91	Athanasios Katsanis	Greece	1:10.99	70	1:12.00	57	2:22.99	+10.94	
66	113	Dardan Dehari	North Macedonia	1:10.84	68	1:12.29	64	2:23.13	+11.08	
67	67	Morteza Jafari	Iran	1:11.37	73	1:12.10	60	2:23.47	+11.42	
68	42	Nikolaos Tziovas	Greece	1:12.22	80	1:11.46	55	2:23.68	+11.63	q
69	72	Uladzislau Chertsin	Belarus	1:11.32	72	1:12.41	65	2:23.73	+11.68	
70	102	Andriy Mariichyn	Ukraine	1:10.49	64	1:13.33	75	2:23.82	+11.77	
71	77	Zhang Xiaosong	China	1:11.59	77	1:12.62	69	2:24.21	+12.16	
72	79	Dino Terzić	Bosnia and Herzegovina	1:11.41	74	1:12.96	73	2:24.37	+12.32	
73	81	Samuel Almeida	Portugal	1:10.95	69	1:13.43	76	2:24.38	+12.33	q
74	83	Filippos Kozaris	Greece	1:11.50	76	1:13.02	74	2:24.52	+12.47	
75	96	Naim Fenianos	Lebanon	1:12.44	83	1:12.57	67	2:25.01	+12.96	q
76	65	Behnam Kiashemshaki	Iran	1:12.40	82	1:12.65	70	2:25.05	+13.00	
77	84	Giorgos Kakkouras	Cyprus	1:11.26	71	1:13.92	80	2:25.18	+13.13	q
78	87	Strahinja Đokanović	Bosnia and Herzegovina	1:11.41	74	1:13.80	79	2:25.21	+13.16	
79	62	Evgeniy Timofeev	Kyrgyzstan	1:12.31	81	1:13.68	77	2:25.99	+13.94	q
80	93	Cesar Arnouk	Lebanon	1:11.86	78	1:14.15	82	2:26.01	+13.96	
81	88	Andreas Epiphaniou	Cyprus	1:12.65	84	1:13.70	78	2:26.35	+14.30	
82	101	Connor Wilson	South Africa	1:12.17	79	1:14.29	83	2:26.46	+14.41	
83	85	Yianno Kouyoumdjian	Cyprus	1:12.98	86	1:14.05	81	2:27.03	+14.98	
84	92	Mohammad Saveh Shemshaki	Iran	1:13.33	87	1:14.39	84	2:27.72	+15.67	
85	80	Viktor Petkov	North Macedonia	1:12.88	85	1:15.21	86	2:28.09	+16.04	
86	90	Vilius Aleksandravicius	Lithuania	1:14.20	89	1:14.65	85	2:28.85	+16.80	
87	89	Bojan Kosić	Montenegro	1:14.25	90	1:15.63	87	2:29.88	+17.83	
88	95	Arbi Pupovci	KOS	1:14.07	88	1:17.24	90	2:31.31	+19.26	
89	106	Arsen Ghazaryan	Armenia	1:14.91	91	1:16.45	88	2:31.36	+19.31	
90	97	Ho Ping-jui	Chinese Taipei	1:15.47	92	1:17.30	91	2:32.77	+20.72	
91	104	Maksim Gordeev	Kyrgyzstan	1:16.00	94	1:17.01	89	2:33.01	+20.96	
92	99	Yohan Gonçalves Goutt	Timor-Leste	1:17.06	95	1:17.66	92	2:34.72	+22.67	
93	103	Carlos Mäder	Ghana	1:17.63	96	1:19.08	93	2:36.71	+24.66	
94	107	Anton Pushkarnykh	Kyrgyzstan	1:18.18	97	1:19.46	94	2:37.64	+25.59	
95	94	Harutyun Harutyunyan	Armenia	1:15.85	93	1:22.18	99	2:38.03	+25.98	
96	115	Alim Ibragimov	Kyrgyzstan	1:18.50	98	1:20.47	95	2:38.97	+26.92	
97	109	Cyril Kayrouz	Lebanon	1:19.26	99	1:20.49	96	2:39.75	+27.70	
98	100	Andy Randriamiarisoa	Madagascar	1:19.38	100	1:20.85	98	2:40.23	+28.18	
99	110	Georges Samaha	Lebanon	1:20.85	104	1:20.84	97	2:41.69	+29.64	
100	120	Hubertus von Hohenlohe	Mexico	1:20.32	102	1:22.19	100	2:42.51	+30.46	
101	116	Yassine Aouich	Morocco	1:20.35	103	1:23.46	103	2:43.81	+31.76	
102	108	Marsel Bicoku	Albania	1:22.39	106	1:22.49	101	2:44.88	+32.83	
103	105	Arif Khan	India	1:22.14	105	1:23.45	102	2:45.59	+33.54	
104	117	Saphal Ram Shrestha	Nepal	1:20.23	101	1:25.77	105	2:46.00	+33.95	
105	111	Vasil Veriga	Albania	1:24.52	108	1:24.57	104	2:49.09	+37.04	
106	114	Mathieu Kaco	Albania	1:23.39	107	1:26.76	106	2:50.15	+38.10	
107	118	Kasete-Naufahu Skeen	Tonga	1:36.96	109	1:40.33	107	3:17.29	+65.24	
108	119	Jean-Pierre Roy	Haiti	1:40.59	110	1:41.73	108	3:22.32	+70.27	
	27	Simon Breitfuss Kammerlander	Bolivia	1:07.85	35	Did not finish				q
	66	Kristinn Logi Auðunsson	Iceland	1:10.00	55	Did not finish				
	2	Ian Gut	Liechtenstein	Did not finish						q
	39	Marcus Vorre	Denmark	Did not finish						
	43	Kieran Norris	Ireland	Did not finish						
	46	Yuri Danilochkin	Belarus	Did not finish						
	55	Cong Liang	China	Did not finish						
	57	Bence Nagy	Hungary	Did not finish						
	58	Antonio Ristevski	North Macedonia	Did not finish						
	60	Mateja Minić	Serbia	Did not finish						
	24	Tom Verbeke	Belgium	Disqualified						
	112	Mehdi Id Yahya	Morocco	Did not start						
