= Kieran Norris =

Irish alpine ski racer (born 1995)

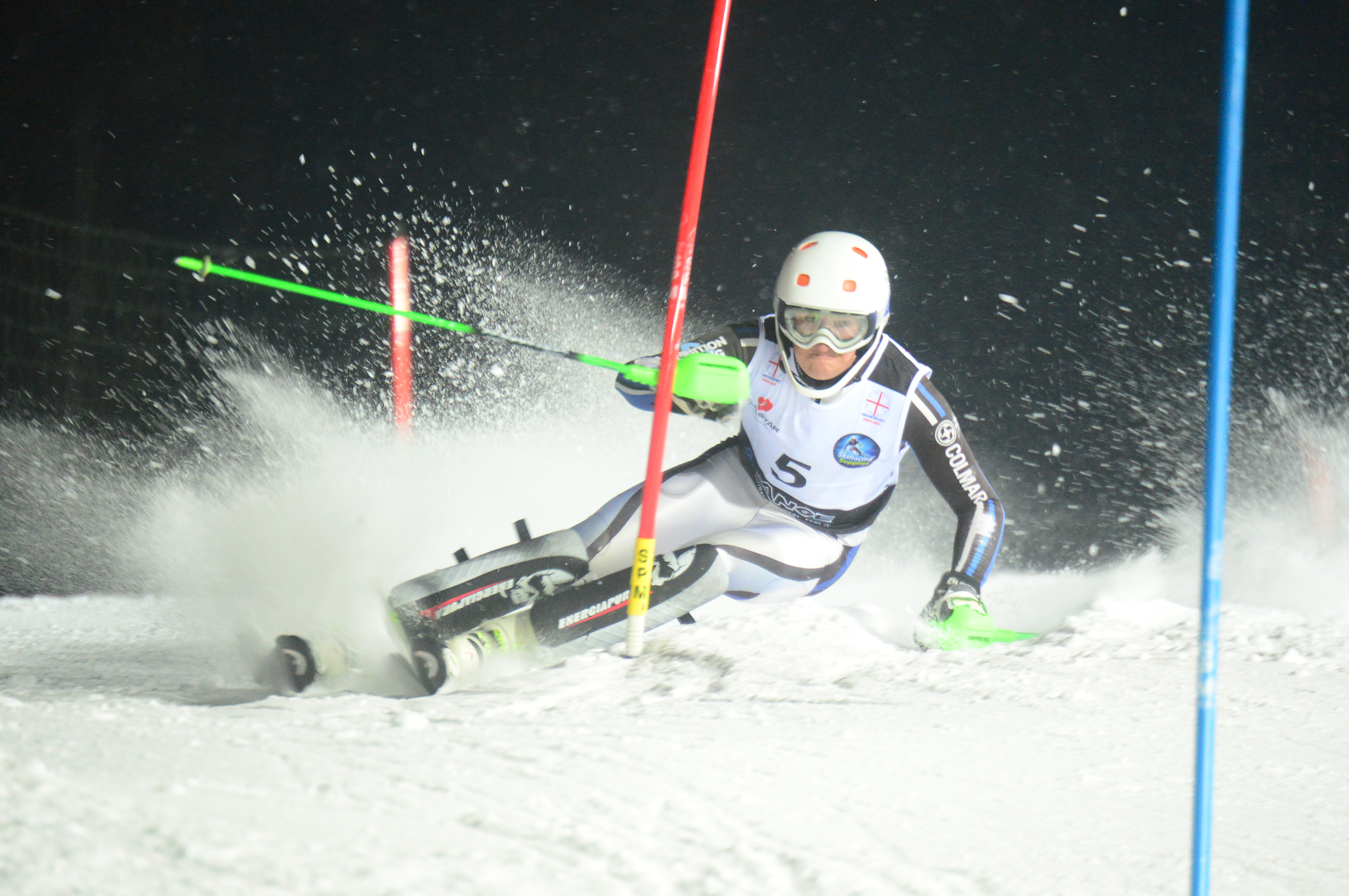
- Kieran Norris in Action at the English Championships. Photo By: Racer-Ready.co.uk

Personal information
- Born: 29 September 1995 (age 30) Chelmsford
- Height: 180 cm (5 ft 11 in)

Skiing career
- Sport: Alpine skiing
- Club: Ambition
- Disciplines: Slalom, giant slalom
World Cup debut
| 24 January 2016 (age 20) |

World Cup
- Seasons: 1st – (2016–)

Kieran Norris (born 29 September 1995) is an Irish alpine ski racer. Norris specializes in the technical events of Slalom and Giant slalom. He competed for the Republic of Ireland at the 2015 World Junior Alpine Skiing Championships.

== Career ==
Kieran started his career racing for GBR where he had some success:

- U18 English GS Champion 2012
- 2nd U21 English GS
- U21 English Slalom Champion 2014
- 2nd British Slalom 2014

At the end of the 2014 season, Kieran moved to Ski for Ireland.

At the 2015 World Junior Alpine Skiing Championships in Hafjell, Norway, Norris failed to finish the second run of the slalom and finished 53rd in the giant slalom. He made his World Cup debut on 24 January 2016 in the Kitzbühel, Austria Slalom. His second appearance was in Schladming on 26 January 2016 where he completed his first World Cup run.

== Junior World Championship results ==
| Year | Age | Slalom | Giant slalom | Super-G | Downhill | Combined |
|---|---|---|---|---|---|---|
| 2015 | 19 | DNF2 | 53 | — | — | — |
