= 2020 Alpine Skiing World Cup – Men's giant slalom =

Alpine ski discipline year standings

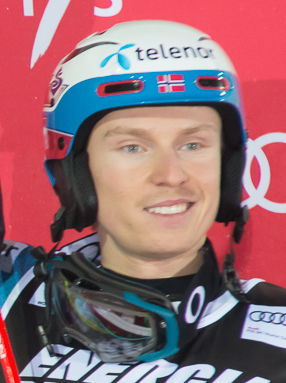
2020 Men's Giant slalom World Cup: Henrik Kristoffersen of Norway, season champion; 2020 Men's World Cup; Overall • Downhill • Super-G; Giant slalom • Slalom; Combined • Parallel
| Previous: 2019 | Next: 2021 |

The men's giant slalom in the 2020 FIS Alpine Skiing World Cup involved seven events, as the last two scheduled giant slaloms in the season were cancelled.

After the retirement of Marcel Hirscher, who had won the last five season titles in giant slalom, the 2020 race in the discipline was wide open, although the focus was on the two skiers fighting for the overall title: Henrik Kristoffersen of Norway and Alexis Pinturault of France. After Pinturault won the seventh giant slalom of the season (his third giant slalom victory in 2020; no one else had two), prior discipline leader Žan Kranjec of Slovenia dropped into fourth place, and Kristofferson (who finished third) was clinging to a six-point lead for the discipline championship over Pinturault with two races to go.

However, first the World Cup finals scheduled for Cortina d'Ampezzo were cancelled by the COVID-19 pandemic, and then the races scheduled in Kranjska Gora were also cancelled by the pandemic. The cancellations handed the season title in giant slalom (as well as the title in slalom) to Kristoffersen without the expected showdown.

== Standings ==
| # | Skier | 27 Oct 2019; Sölden (Austria) | 08 Dec 2019; Beaver Creek (United States) | 22 Dec 2019; Alta Badia (Italy) | 11 Jan 2020; Adelboden (Switzerland) | 02 Feb 2020; Garmisch-Partenkirchen (Germany) | 22 Feb 2020; Niigata Yuzawa Naeba (Japan) | 02 Mar 2020; Hinterstoder (Austria) | 14 Mar 2020; Kranjska Gora (Slovenia) | 21 Mar 2020; Cortina d'Ampezzo (Italy) | Total |
| | (Norway) Henrik Kristoffersen | 13 | 80 | 100 | 60 | 36 | 45 | 60 | x | x | 394 |
| 2 | (France) Alexis Pinturault | 100 | 14 | 32 | 26 | 100 | 16 | 100 | x | x | 388 |
| 3 | (Croatia) Filip Zubčić | DNF1 | 32 | 26 | 80 | 50 | 100 | 80 | x | x | 368 |
| 4 | (Slovenia) Žan Kranjec | 60 | 50 | 60 | 100 | 45 | 29 | 20 | x | x | 364 |
| 5 | (United States) Tommy Ford | 50 | 100 | 11 | DNF1 | 24 | 60 | 22 | x | x | 267 |
| 6 | (Norway) Leif Kristian Nestvold-Haugen | 26 | 60 | 24 | DNF1 | 60 | 50 | 29 | x | x | 249 |
| 7 | (France) Mathieu Faivre | 80 | 40 | 9 | 32 | 22 | 13 | 29 | x | x | 225 |
| | (Norway) Aleksander Aamodt Kilde | 10 | DNF1 | 50 | 45 | 40 | 40 | 40 | x | x | 225 |
| 9 | (Switzerland) Marco Odermatt | 20 | DNF1 | 45 | DNS | 16 | 80 | 50 | x | x | 211 |
| 10 | (France) Victor Muffat-Jeandet | 3 | 45 | 7 | 60 | 32 | 36 | 8 | x | x | 191 |
| 11 | (Switzerland) Loïc Meillard | DNF2 | 15 | 22 | 14 | 80 | DNS | 36 | x | x | 167 |
| 12 | (United States) Ted Ligety | 45 | 24 | DNF1 | 36 | 18 | 24 | 15 | x | x | 162 |
| 13 | (Italy) Luca De Aliprandini | 32 | 18 | 15 | DNF2 | 13 | 26 | 45 | x | x | 149 |
| 14 | (Switzerland) Gino Caviezel | 29 | 29 | 14 | DNF1 | 26 | 22 | 18 | x | x | 138 |
| 15 | (Norway) Lucas Braathen | 40 | 16 | 32 | 20 | 12 | 15 | DNF1 | x | x | 135 |
| 16 | (France) Cyprien Sarrazin | DNQ | 20 | 80 | DNF2 | DNQ | 3 | 10 | x | x | 113 |
| 17 | (Austria) Roland Leitinger | 12 | 10 | 8 | 40 | DNF1 | 20 | 13 | x | x | 103 |
| 18 | (Austria) Marco Schwarz | DNS | 6 | 40 | 24 | DNQ | 8 | 12 | x | x | 101 |
| 19 | (Germany) Alexander Schmid | 4 | 11 | 20 | 11 | 20 | 11 | 15 | x | x | 92 |
| 20 | (United States) Ryan Cochran-Siegle | 24 | 8 | 12 | 13 | 9 | DNQ | 16 | x | x | 82 |
| 21 | (Sweden) Matts Olsson | 14 | 22 | DNF1 | 24 | DNF1 | 8 | 12 | x | x | 80 |
| 22 | (Germany) Stefan Luitz | 15 | DNF1 | DNQ | DNQ | 29 | DNS | 32 | x | x | 76 |
| 23 | (Canada) Erik Read | 36 | DNF2 | DNF1 | 7 | 14 | 9 | 7 | x | x | 73 |
| 24 | (France) Thibaut Favrot | 6 | 13 | 20 | DNF2 | DNQ | 32 | DNF1 | x | x | 71 |
| 25 | (Canada) Trevor Philp | 5 | 36 | DNQ | DNQ | 11 | 6 | 9 | x | x | 67 |
| | References | | | | | | | | | | |

- Winner
- 2nd place
- 3rd place
- DNS = Did not start
- DNF1 = Did not finish run 1
- DNQ = Did not qualify for run 2
- DNF2 = Did not finish run 2

Updated at 21 March 2020 after all events.

== See also ==
- 2020 Alpine Skiing World Cup – Men's summary rankings
- 2020 Alpine Skiing World Cup – Men's overall
- 2020 Alpine Skiing World Cup – Men's downhill
- 2020 Alpine Skiing World Cup – Men's super-G
- 2020 Alpine Skiing World Cup – Men's slalom
- 2020 Alpine Skiing World Cup – Men's combined
- 2020 Alpine Skiing World Cup – Men's parallel
- World Cup scoring system
