= Roland Leitinger =

Austrian alpine skier

Medal record

Men's alpine skiing

Representing Austria

World Championships
Silver medal – second place	2017 St. Moritz	Giant slalom

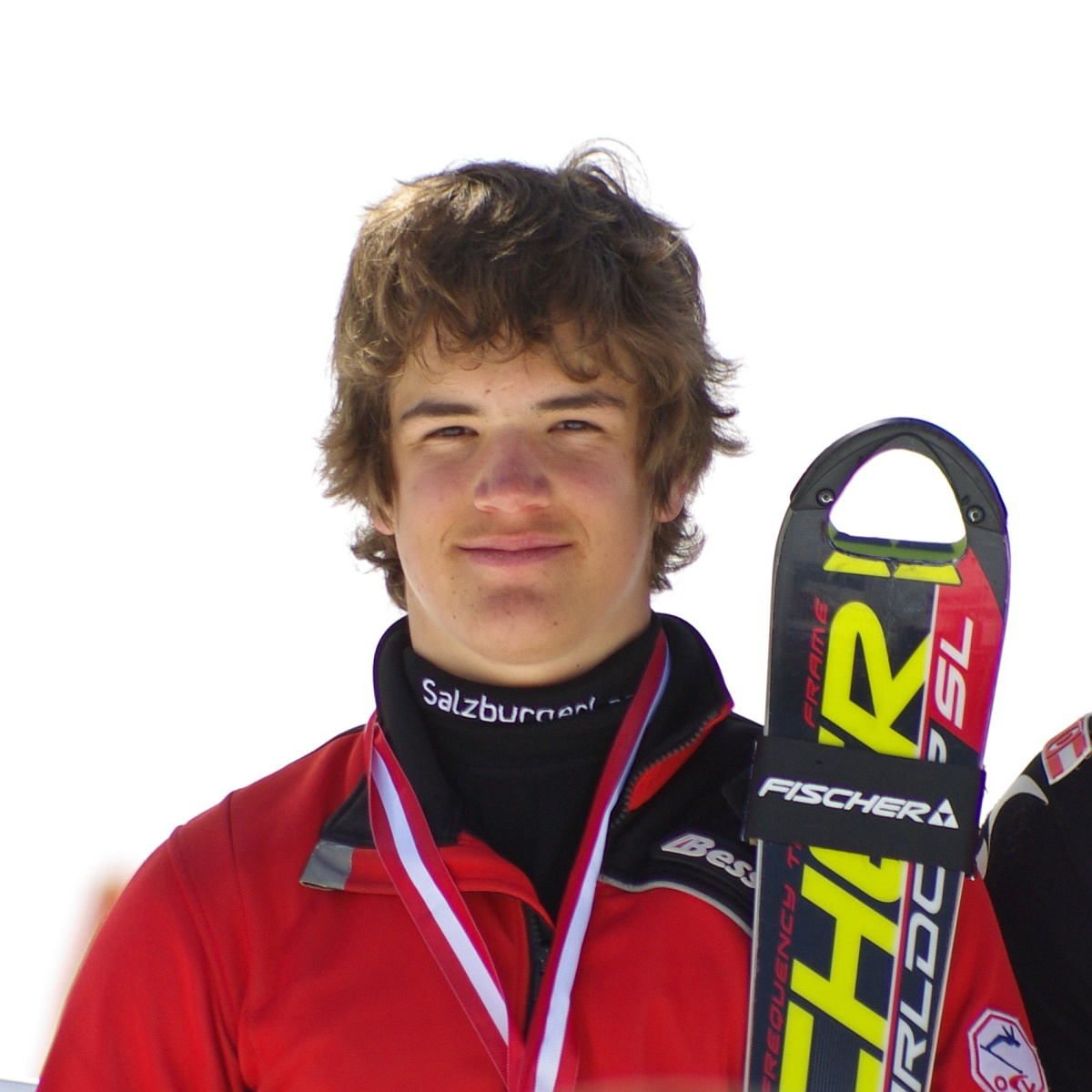

Roland Leitinger (born 13 May 1991) is an Austrian World Cup retired alpine ski racer who competed in giant slalom, both classic and parallel, having a podium in both variants. He also started two slalom races, failing to qualify to a second run. He made his World Cup debut in February 2011 and retired in December 2023.

== World Cup results ==
=== Season standings ===
Season	Age	Overall	Slalom	Giant slalom	Super-G	Downhill	Combined
2015	23	134	—	42	—	—	—
2016	24	69	—	24	—	—	—
2017	25	63	—	19	—	—	—
2018	26	91	—	29	—	—	—
2019	27	122	—	41	—	—	—
2020	28	39	—	17	—	—	—
2021	29	62	—	22	—	—	—
2022	30	79	—	22	—	—	—
2023	31	112	—	36	—	—	—
2024	32	retired after 1 race, no points					

=== Race podiums ===
- 0 wins
- 2 podiums – (1 GS, 1 PG); 8 top tens

Season	Date	Location	Discipline	Place
2020	23 December 2019	Alta Badia, Italy	Parallel-G	3rd
2022	24 October 2021	Sölden, Austria	Giant slalom	2nd

== World Championship results ==
Year	Age	Slalom	Giant slalom	Super-G	Downhill	Combined
2017	25	—	2	—	—	—
2019	27	—	DNF2	—	—	—
