= Alpine skiing at the 2022 Winter Olympics – Men's giant slalom =

Men's giant slalom at the XXIV Olympic Winter Games
- Alpine skiing
- Venue: Ice River, Yanqing District
- Date: 13 February 2022
- Competitors: 89 from 62 nations
- Winning time: 2:09.35

Medalists
1st place, gold medalist(s)		Marco Odermatt	Switzerland
2nd place, silver medalist(s)		Žan Kranjec	Slovenia
3rd place, bronze medalist(s)		Mathieu Faivre	France

The men's giant slalom competition of the Beijing 2022 Olympics was held on 13 February, on "Ice River" course at the Yanqing National Alpine Ski Centre in Yanqing District. Marco Odermatt of Switzerland won the event. Žan Kranjec of Slovenia won the silver medal, and Mathieu Faivre of France bronze. For all of them, they got their first Olympic medals.

Marcel Hirscher, the 2018 champion, retired from competitions. The silver medalist, Henrik Kristoffersen, and the bronze medalist, Alexis Pinturault, qualified for the Olympics. At the 2021–22 FIS Alpine Ski World Cup, six giant slalom events were held before the Olympics. Marco Odermatt was leading the ranking, followed by Manuel Feller and Kristoffersen. Mathieu Faivre was the 2021 world champion, with Luca De Aliprandini and Marco Schwarz being the silver and bronze medalists, respectively.

Kranjec, the eighth in the first run, had a good second run and was leading the competition, while skiers with better first run either did not finish or had a worse total. Faivre, with the third time in the first run, was the best of these. Odermatt, who won the first run, was skiing last in the second run and remained on top.

== Results ==
Results are as follows:

Rank	Bib	Name	Nation	Run 1	Rank	Run 2	Rank	Total	Behind
1st place, gold medalist(s)	4	Marco Odermatt	Switzerland	1:02.93	1	1:06.42	2	2:09.35	–
2nd place, silver medalist(s)	13	Žan Kranjec	Slovenia	1:03.71	8	1:05.83	1	2:09.54	+0.19
3rd place, bronze medalist(s)	5	Mathieu Faivre	France	1:03.01	3	1:07.68	13	2:10.69	+1.34
4	16	River Radamus	United States	1:03.79	9	1:07.16	5	2:10.95	+1.60
5	17	Thibaut Favrot	France	1:03.12	5	1:07.92	14	2:11.04	+1.69
5	6	Alexis Pinturault	France	1:03.99	11	1:07.05	4	2:11.04	+1.69
7	8	Gino Caviezel	Switzerland	1:03.90	10	1:07.30	6	2:11.20	+1.85
8	1	Henrik Kristoffersen	Norway	1:03.05	4	1:08.20	18	2:11.25	+1.90
9	32	Joan Verdú	Andorra	1:04.48	13	1:06.80	3	2:11.28	+1.93
10	3	Filip Zubčić	Croatia	1:04.69	15	1:07.40	9	2:12.09	+2.74
11	25	Raphael Haaser	Austria	1:04.99	17	1:07.40	9	2:12.39	+3.04
12	20	Tommy Ford	United States	1:05.07	19	1:07.34	7	2:12.41	+3.06
13	18	Erik Read	Canada	1:04.77	16	1:07.67	12	2:12.44	+3.09
14	10	Marco Schwarz	Austria	1:05.04	18	1:07.43	11	2:12.47	+3.12
15	22	Adam Žampa	Slovakia	1:05.86	21	1:08.05	16	2:13.91	+4.56
16	35	Andreas Žampa	Slovakia	1:06.15	23	1:08.16	17	2:14.31	+4.96
17	53	Albert Popov	Bulgaria	1:07.60	27	1:07.34	7	2:14.94	+5.59
18	33	Maarten Meiners	Netherlands	1:06.03	22	1:09.45	20	2:15.48	+6.13
19	38	Kryštof Krýzl	Czech Republic	1:07.29	26	1:08.27	19	2:15.56	+6.21
20	29	Julian Rauchfuß	Germany	1:08.23	30	1:07.99	15	2:16.22	+6.87
21	49	Samuel Kolega	Croatia	1:06.53	24	1:10.75	23	2:17.28	+7.93
22	52	Barnabás Szőllős	Israel	1:07.89	28	1:10.04	21	2:17.93	+8.58
23	43	Louis Muhlen-Schulte	Australia	1:08.44	32	1:10.04	21	2:18.48	+9.13
24	23	Trevor Philp	Canada	1:07.14	25	1:11.94	24	2:19.08	+9.73
25	51	Jack Gower	Ireland	1:08.30	31	1:12.26	25	2:20.56	+11.21
26	57	Miks Zvejnieks	Latvia	1:09.59	33	1:13.04	26	2:22.63	+13.28
27	12	Stefan Brennsteiner	Austria	1:02.97	2	1:22:01	40	2:24.98	+15.63
28	58	Matthieu Osch	Luxembourg	1:10.60	34	1:15.94	28	2:26.54	+17.19
29	60	Komiljon Tukhtaev	Uzbekistan	1:12.77	35	1:14.72	27	2:27.49	+18.14
30	73	Albin Tahiri	Kosovo	1:13.42	37	1:16.43	29	2:29.85	+20.50
31	72	Michael Poettoz	Colombia	1:12.83	36	1:17.19	30	2:30.02	+20.67
32	71	Alexandru Ștefănescu	Romania	1:14.20	38	1:19.01	33	2:33.21	+23.86
33	78	Xu Mingfu	China	1:15.96	41	1:17.26	31	2:33.22	+23.87
34	61	Márton Kékesi	Hungary	1:14.47	39	1:19.07	34	2:33.54	+24.19
35	77	Rodolfo Dickson	Mexico	1:17.32	43	1:17.27	32	2:34.59	+25.24
36	87	Zhang Yangming	China	1:15.66	40	1:19.51	35	2:35.17	+25.82
37	67	Ricardo Brancal	Portugal	1:16.83	42	1:20.57	36	2:37.40	+28.05
38	74	Nicola Zanon	Thailand	1:17.53	44	1:20.83	37	2:38.36	+29.01
39	88	Shannon-Ogbnai Abeda	Eritrea	1:17.95	46	1:22.50	41	2:40.45	+31.10
40	89	William Flaherty	Puerto Rico	1:20.16	48	1:21.26	38	2:41.42	+32.07
41	69	Eldar Salihović	Montenegro	1:18.84	47	1:22.70	42	2:41.54	+32.19
42	66	Yianno Kouyoumdjian	Cyprus	1:20.66	50	1:21.85	39	2:42.51	+33.16
43	75	Berkin Usta	Turkey	1:17.91	45	1:24.81	43	2:42.72	+33.37
44	81	Fayik Abdi	Saudi Arabia	1:21.44	51	1:25.41	45	2:46.85	+37.50
45	85	Arif Khan	India	1:22.35	53	1:24.89	44	2:47.24	+37.89
46	83	Benjamin Alexander	Jamaica	1:37.94	54	1:40.58	46	3:18.52	+1:09.17
	2	Luca De Aliprandini	Italy	1:03.42	6	DNF	—N/a		
	7	Manuel Feller	Austria	1:03.67	7	DNF	—N/a		
	14	Lucas Braathen	Norway	1:04.20	12	DNF	—N/a		
	26	Mattias Rönngren	Sweden	1:04.48	13	DNF	—N/a		
	37	Andrej Drukarov	Lithuania	1:05.78	20	DNF	—N/a		
	55	Emir Lokmić	Bosnia and Herzegovina	1:08.00	29	DNF	—N/a		
	79	Yohan Goutt Gonçalves	Timor-Leste	1:21.52	52	DNF	—N/a		
	82	Matteo Gatti	San Marino	1:20.40	49	DSQ	—N/a		
	9	Alexander Schmid	Germany	DNF	—N/a				
	11	Justin Murisier	Switzerland	DNF	—N/a				
	15	Loïc Meillard	Switzerland	DNF	—N/a				
	19	Rasmus Windingstad	Norway	DNF	—N/a				
	21	Atle Lie McGrath	Norway	DNF	—N/a				
	24	Cyprien Sarrazin	France	DNF	—N/a				
	27	Ryan Cochran-Siegle	United States	DNF	—N/a				
	28	Aleksandr Andrienko	ROC	DNF	—N/a				
	30	Ivan Kuznetsov	ROC	DNF	—N/a				
	31	Sam Maes	Belgium	DNF	—N/a				
	34	Samu Torsti	Finland	DNF	—N/a				
	36	Jung Dong-hyun	South Korea	DNF	—N/a				
	39	Tommaso Sala	Italy	DNF	—N/a				
	40	Jan Zabystřan	Czech Republic	DNF	—N/a				
	41	Dries Van den Broecke	Belgium	DNF	—N/a				
	42	Luke Winters	United States	DNF	—N/a				
	44	Alex Vinatzer	Italy	DNF	—N/a				
	45	Michał Jasiczek	Poland	DNF	—N/a				
	47	Tormis Laine	Estonia	DNF	—N/a				
	48	Linus Straßer	Germany	DNF	—N/a				
	50	Tomás Birkner de Miguel	Argentina	DNF	—N/a				
	54	Paweł Pyjas	Poland	DNF	—N/a				
	56	Soso Japharidze	Georgia	DNF	—N/a				
	59	Denni Xhepa	Albania	DNF	—N/a				
	62	Adrian Yung	Hong Kong	DNF	—N/a				
	63	Asa Miller	Philippines	DNF	—N/a				
	64	Ioannis Antoniou	Greece	DNF	—N/a				
	65	Zakhar Kuchin	Kazakhstan	DNF	—N/a				
	68	Richardson Viano	Haiti	DNF	—N/a				
	70	Cesar Arnouk	Lebanon	DNF	—N/a				
	76	Carlos Maeder	Ghana	DNF	—N/a				
	80	Yassine Aouich	Morocco	DNF	—N/a				
	86	Mathieu Neumuller	Madagascar	DNF	—N/a				
	46	Michel Macedo	Brazil	DNS	—N/a				
	84	Harutyun Harutyunyan	Armenia	DNS	—N/a				
