= 2020 Alpine Skiing World Cup – Men's overall =

Alpine ski discipline year standings

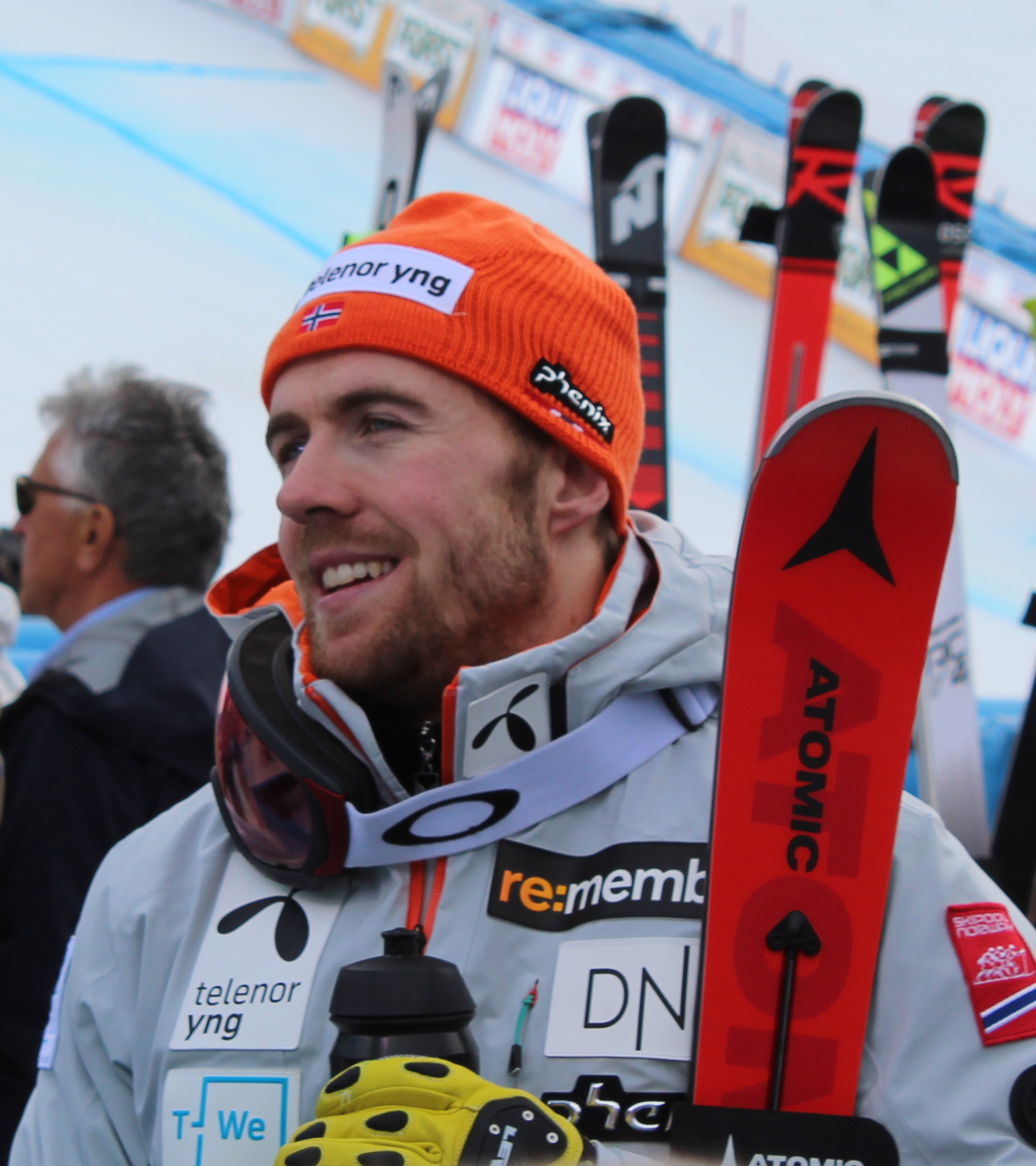
2020 men's overall World Cup: Aleksander Aamodt Kilde of Norway, season champion; 2020 men's World Cup; Overall • downhill • super-g; giant slalom • slalom; combined • parallel
Previous: 2019	Next: 2021

The men's overall in the 2020 FIS Alpine Skiing World Cup consisted of 36 events in 6 disciplines: downhill (DH), Super-G (SG), giant slalom (GS), slalom (SL), Alpine combined (AC), and parallel (PAR). The season was originally scheduled to have 44 men's races plus a mixed team event, but a race in Japan plus final the seven men's races and the mixed team event were all cancelled, as discussed below.

A new overall champion was certain to be crowned, as Marcel Hirscher of Austria, the winner of the previous 8 World Cup overall titles, had retired at the end of the 2019 season, and all winners prior to him had also retired. And the battle eventually turned into a three-man battle between two Norwegians -- Aleksander Aamodt Kilde, a speed specialist, and Henrik Kristoffersen, a technical specialist -- and a Frenchman -- Alexis Pinturault, who competes in all disciplines.

After only canceling one race all season (in Japan) thanks to aggressive rescheduling, the season was terminated with the final seven events all being canceled. The first was cancelled due to wind and fog; the following six were all canceled due to the COVID-19 pandemic. The last event completed prior to the premature shutdown was a downhill at Kvitfjell, and in that race, Kilde (who finished second, worth 80 points) grabbed the overall lead by 54 points from Pinturault (who failed to finish in the top 30 and thus did not score). When the season never resumed after that race, Kilde clinched the overall season championship and the crystal globe that goes with it.

== Standings ==
#	Skier	DH; 9 races	SG; 6 races	GS; 7 races	SL; 9 races	AC; 3 races	PAR; 2 races	Total
	(Norway) Aleksander Aamodt Kilde	413	336	225	0	172	56	1,202
2	(France) Alexis Pinturault	0	169	388	286	280	25	1,148
3	(Norway) Henrik Kristoffersen	0	9	394	552	24	62	1,041
4	(Austria) Matthias Mayer	424	324	28	0	140	0	916
5	(Austria) Vincent Kriechmayr	362	362	0	0	70	0	794
6	(Switzerland) Beat Feuz	650	142	0	0	0	0	792
7	(Switzerland) Mauro Caviezel	220	365	0	0	80	4	669
8	(Norway) Kjetil Jansrud	248	305	0	0	112	0	665
9	(Germany) Thomas Dreßen	438	164	0	0	0	0	602
10	(Switzerland) Loïc Meillard	0	0	167	144	139	129	579
11	(Italy) Dominik Paris	384	145	0	0	27	0	556
12	(France) Clément Noël	0	0	0	550	0	0	550
13	(Switzerland) Daniel Yule	0	0	0	495	0	0	495
14	(Croatia) Filip Zubčić	0	0	368	63	16	28	475
15	(France) Victor Muffat-Jeandet	0	1	191	143	124	6	465
16	(Slovenia) Žan Kranjec	0	0	364	22	0	59	445
17	(Switzerland) Marco Odermatt	20	203	211	0	0	0	434
18	(Austria) Marco Schwarz	0	0	101	274	32	7	414
19	(France) Johan Clarey	316	89	0	0	0	0	405
20	(United States) Ryan Cochran-Siegle	143	58	82	0	70	22	375
21	(Norway) Leif Kristian Nestvold-Haugen	0	0	249	27	0	61	337
22	(United States) Tommy Ford	0	0	267	0	0	58	325
23	(Switzerland) Ramon Zenhäusern	0	0	0	323	0	0	323
24	(United States) Travis Ganong	169	140	0	0	0	0	309
25	(Norway) Sebastian Foss-Solevåg	0	0	0	297	0	0	297

- Leader
- 2nd place
- 3rd place
- Updated at 21 March 2020, after all events

== See also ==
- 2020 Alpine Skiing World Cup – Men's summary rankings
- 2020 Alpine Skiing World Cup – Men's downhill
- 2020 Alpine Skiing World Cup – Men's super-G
- 2020 Alpine Skiing World Cup – Men's giant slalom
- 2020 Alpine Skiing World Cup – Men's slalom
- 2020 Alpine Skiing World Cup – Men's combined
- 2020 Alpine Skiing World Cup – Men's parallel
- 2020 Alpine Skiing World Cup – Women's overall
- World Cup scoring system
