= 2020 Alpine Skiing World Cup – Men's super-G =

Alpine ski discipline year standings

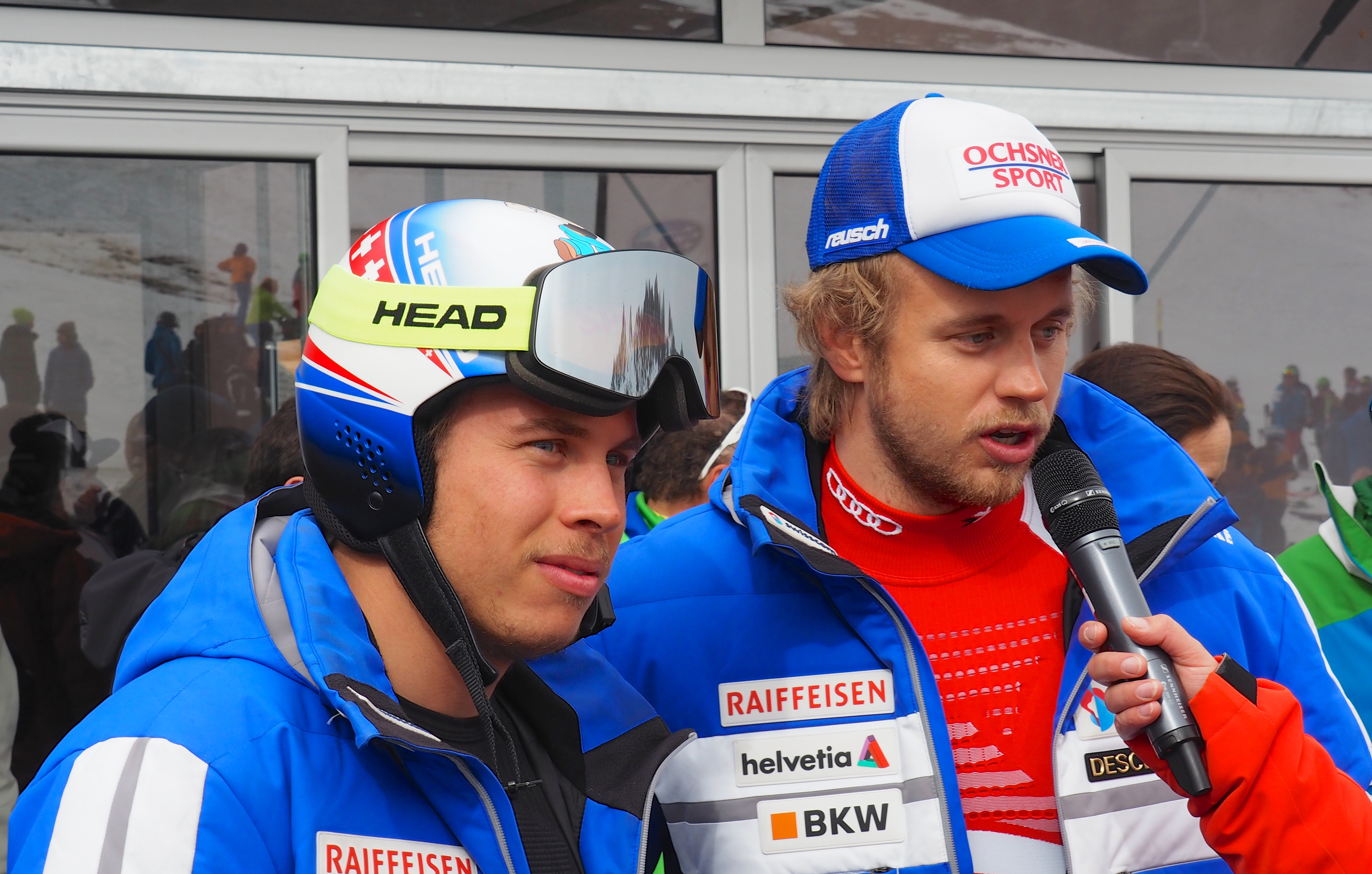
2020 Men's Super-G World Cup: Mauro Caviezel ((R), with his brother Gino (L)) of Switzerland, season champion; 2020 Men's World Cup; Overall • Downhill • Super-G; Giant slalom • Slalom; Combined • Parallel
Previous: 2019	Next: 2021

The men's super-G in the 2020 FIS Alpine Skiing World Cup involved six events, as the last two scheduled Super-Gs were canceled.

With three events to go, 2016 discipline champion Aleksander Aamodt Kilde held a slim lead in the Super-G over four competitors ranging between 51 and 74 points behind; however, at a Super-G race in Hinterstoder, Austria, Kilde crashed and failed to finish, allowing the top two finishers in the race—Swiss skier Mauro Caviezel (who had been in second and finished second) and local native Vincent Kriechmayr (who had been in fifth and won)—to both pass Kilde with two races still to go in the season. Caviezel held a narrow three-point lead over Kriechmayr, with Kilde 29 points back and the other two still in close pursuit. However, the next-to-last Super-G of the season at Kvitfjell, Kilde's home turf, was cancelled due to bad weather, and then the finals were also cancelled due to the COVID-19 pandemic, thus handing the season title to Caviezel by the three-point margin . . . without the expected showdown.

== Standings ==
Rank	Name	01/12; Lake Louise (Canada)	06/12; Beaver Creek (United States)	20/12; Val Gardena/Gröden (Italy)	24/01; Kitzbühel (Austria)	14/02; Saalbach-Hinterglemm (Austria)	29/02; Hinterstoder (Austria)	8 Mar 2020; Kvitfjell (Norway)	19 Mar 2020; Cortina d'Ampezzo (Italy)	Total
	(Switzerland) Mauro Caviezel	60	45	50	50	80	80	x	x	365
2	(Austria) Vincent Kriechmayr	60	36	100	40	26	100	x	x	362
3	(Norway) Aleksander Aamodt Kilde	40	80	36	80	100	DNF	x	x	336
4	(Austria) Matthias Mayer	100	60	24	80	DNF	60	x	x	324
5	(Norway) Kjetil Jansrud	32	24	80	100	29	40	x	x	305
6	(Italy) Mattia Casse	45	26	16	45	45	32	x	x	209
7	(Switzerland) Marco Odermatt	36	100	7	20	22	18	x	x	203
8	(France) Alexis Pinturault	DNS	50	DNS	29	40	50	x	x	169
9	(Germany) Thomas Dreßen	26	4	60	14	60	DNF	x	x	164
10	(Italy) Dominik Paris	80	20	45	DNS					145
11	(Switzerland) Beat Feuz	16	16	29	36	DNF	45	x	x	142
12	(United States) Travis Ganong	22	40	0	26	36	16	x	x	140
13	(Germany) Andreas Sander	14	18	22	32	36	DNF	x	x	122
14	(Austria) Christian Walder	20	0	11	13	50	DNF	x	x	94
15	(France) Johan Clarey	6	0	36	24	20	3	x	x	89
	(France) Nils Allègre	8	14	0	18	13	36	x	x	89
17	(Austria) Hannes Reichelt	12	29	40	DNS					81
18	(Austria) Max Franz	24	1	0	7	24	24	x	x	80
19	(Italy) Emanuele Buzzi	20	DNF	0	11	18	29	x	x	78
20	(United States) Ryan Cochran-Siegle	10	13	0	5	15	15	x	x	58
21	(France) Adrien Théaux	29	DNF	26	DNS					55
22	(Canada) James Crawford	0	10	14	7	0	22	x	x	53
23	(Austria) Daniel Danklmaier	0	0	DNF	22	16	14	x	x	52
24	(Norway) Adrian Smiseth Sejersted	3	22	16	DNS					51
25	(Switzerland) Gino Caviezel	DNS	6	18	0	0	26	x	x	50
	References									

- Winner
- 2nd place
- 3rd place
- DNF = Did not finish
- DNS = Did not start
- Updated at 19 March 2020, after all events.

== See also ==
- 2020 Alpine Skiing World Cup – Men's summary rankings
- 2020 Alpine Skiing World Cup – Men's overall
- 2020 Alpine Skiing World Cup – Men's downhill
- 2020 Alpine Skiing World Cup – Men's giant slalom
- 2020 Alpine Skiing World Cup – Men's slalom
- 2020 Alpine Skiing World Cup – Men's combined
- 2020 Alpine Skiing World Cup – Men's parallel
- World Cup scoring system
