= 2020 Alpine Skiing World Cup – Men's combined =

Alpine ski discipline year standings

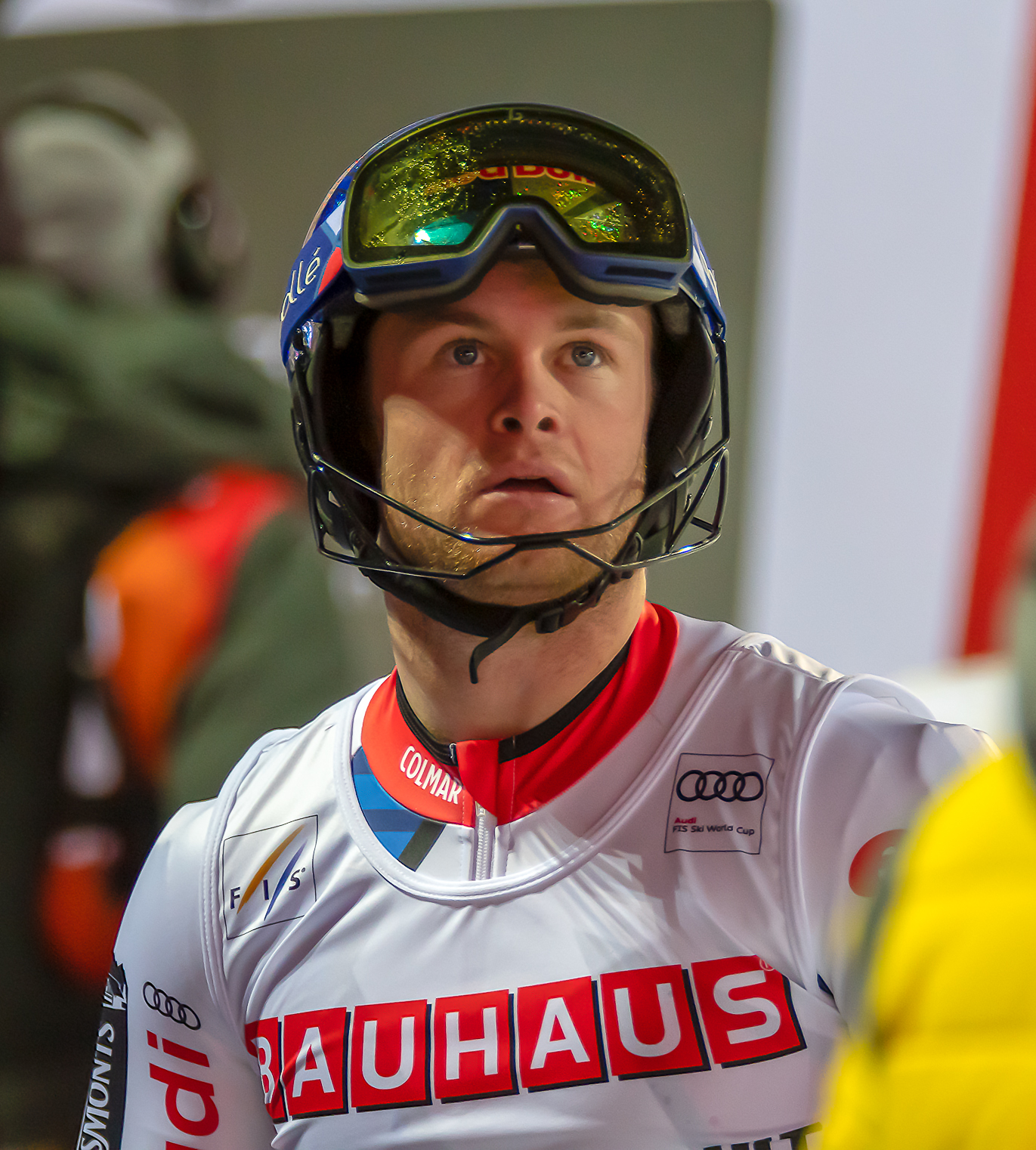
2020 Men's combined World Cup: Alexis Pinturault of France, season champion; 2020 Men's World Cup; Overall • Downhill • Super-G; Giant slalom • Slalom; Combined • Parallel
Previous: 2019	Next: 2021

The Men's combined in the 2020 FIS Alpine Skiing World Cup involved 3 events, all of which were completed before the season was halted due to the COVID-19 pandemic. A major change was made in the discipline this season due to the recent dominance of slalom specialists in the combined over speed racers (downhill/Super G). As was previously the case, the first run continued to be the speed discipline (with Super-G having the preference over downhill). The second run (the slalom) then started in reverse order of finish in the speed run, which allowed the slalom specialists (who tended to be significantly slower in the speed run) to tackle fresh snow as the first down the hill in the slalom run, while the speed specialists had to face the more challenging rutted snow at the end of the day, as the last skiers of the 30 who qualified for the second run. Instead, the second run was changed to start in the same order as the finish of the speed run, so that the leader after the speed run became the first to race on the fresh slalom course.

In the 2020 season, two of the three combined races were run as a Super-G followed by a slalom (traditionally called an Alpine combined); only the race at Wengen featured a downhill followed by a slalom (traditionally known as a super-combined). Two of the three events (both of the Alpine combineds) were won by Alexis Pinturault of France, the only skier this season who ranked in the top ten in both Super-G and slalom, who thus won the season championship. At this time, combined races were not included in the season finals, which were scheduled in 2020 in Cortina d'Ampezzo, Italy (but were not held due to the pandemic).

== Standings ==
#	Skier	29 Dec 2019; Bormio (Italy)	17 Jan 2020; Wengen (Switzerland)	01 Mar 2020; Hinterstoder (Austria)	Total
	(France) Alexis Pinturault	100	80	100	280
2	(Norway) Aleksander Aamodt Kilde	80	32	60	172
3	(Austria) Matthias Mayer	DNF2	100	40	140
	(Italy) Riccardo Tonetti	50	45	45	140
5	(Switzerland) Loïc Meillard	60	50	29	139
6	(France) Victor Muffat-Jeandet	24	60	40	124
7	(Norway) Kjetil Jansrud	26	36	50	112
8	(Switzerland) Mauro Caviezel	DNS	DNF1	80	80
9	(Russia) Pavel Trikhichev	36	14	26	76
10	(United States) Ryan Cochran-Siegle	45	12	13	70
	(Austria) Vincent Kriechmayr	22	26	22	70
12	(Switzerland) Justin Murisier	29	24	9	62
13	(France) Nils Allègre	40	15	6	61
14	(Slovenia) Martin Čater	DNF2	40	20	60
15	(Switzerland) Gino Caviezel	32	DNS	11	43
16	(United States) Bryce Bennett	13	18	10	41
17	(Switzerland) Luca Aerni	DNF1	20	18	38
	(Austria) Daniel Danklmaier	14	9	15	38
19	(Switzerland) Niels Hintermann	8	29	DNF1	37
20	(Austria) Marco Schwarz	DNS		32	32
21	(Switzerland) Gilles Roulin	10	16	5	31
22	(Switzerland) Stefan Rogentin	18	11	1	30
23	(Italy) Dominik Paris	5	22	DNS	27
24	(Slovenia) Klemen Kosi	15	4	7	26
25	(Slovenia) Stefan Hadalin	11	DNF2	14	25
	References				

- Winner
- 2nd place
- 3rd place
- DNS = Did not start
- DNF1 = Did not finish run 1
- DNF2 = Did not finish run 2
- Updated at 21 March 2020, after all events.

== See also ==
- 2020 Alpine Skiing World Cup – Men's summary rankings
- 2020 Alpine Skiing World Cup – Men's overall
- 2020 Alpine Skiing World Cup – Men's downhill
- 2020 Alpine Skiing World Cup – Men's super-G
- 2020 Alpine Skiing World Cup – Men's giant slalom
- 2020 Alpine Skiing World Cup – Men's slalom
- 2020 Alpine Skiing World Cup – Men's parallel
- World Cup scoring system
