= 2020 Alpine Skiing World Cup – Men's slalom =

Alpine ski discipline year standings

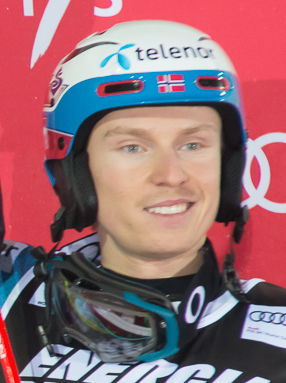
2020 Men's slalom World Cup: Henrik Kristoffersen of Norway, season champion; 2020 Men's World Cup; Overall • Downhill • Super-G; Giant slalom • Slalom; Combined • Parallel
Previous: 2019	Next: 2021

The men's slalom in the 2020 FIS Alpine Ski World Cup involved only nine events, as the final three scheduled slaloms of the season were cancelled.

After the retirement of Marcel Hirscher, who had won the slalom discipline in six of the prior seven seasons, the strong favorite for the discipline championship was 2016 winner Henrik Kristoffersen of Norway (the only prior champion still active). Kristoffersen, in fact, had gotten off to a huge lead over the field in the middle of the season. However, after failing to finish a slalom in Chamonix, Kristoffersen was clinging to just a two-point lead in this discipline over Clément Noël of France (who won the race), with three races still remaining on the schedule. But then a race in Japan was canceled due to high winds, followed by the season finale scheduled for Cortina d'Ampezzo being cancelled by the COVID-19 pandemic, and finally, the race scheduled in Kranjska Gora was also cancelled by the pandemic.

The cancellations handed the season title in slalom (as well as the title in giant slalom) to Kristoffersen without the expected showdown.

== Standings ==
#	Skier	24 Nov 2019; Levi (Finland)	15 Dec 2019; Val-d'Isère (France)	05 Jan 2020; Zagreb (Croatia)	08 Jan 2020; Madonna di Campiglio (Italy)	12 Jan 2020; Adelboden (Switzerland)	19 Jan 2020; Wengen (Switzerland)	26 Jan 2020; Kitzbühel (Austria)	28 Jan 2020; Schladming (Austria)	08 Feb 2020; Chamonix (France)	23 Feb 2020; Niigata Yuzawa Naeba (Japan)	15 Mar 2020; Kranjska Gora (Slovenia)	22 Mar 2020; Cortina d'Ampezzo (Italy)	Total
	(Norway) Henrik Kristoffersen	100	50	12	80	80	80	50	100	DNF1	x	x	x	552
2	(France) Clément Noël	80	DNF1	100	60	DNF2	100	60	50	100	x	x	x	550
3	(Switzerland) Daniel Yule	60	26	4	100	100	45	100	60	DNF2	x	x	x	495
4	(Switzerland) Ramon Zenhäusern	50	DNF2	80	DNF2	50	45	24	29	45	x	x	x	323
5	(Norway) Sebastian Foss-Solevåg	29	29	18	50	26	50	26	29	40	x	x	x	297
6	(France) Alexis Pinturault	DNQ	100	29	45	32	DNF2	DNF2	80	DNF2	x	x	x	286
7	(Austria) Marco Schwarz	6	20	24	16	60	36	80	DNF2	32	x	x	x	274
8	(Sweden) André Myhrer	45	80	50	DNF2	22	DNF1	DNQ	8	29	x	x	x	234
9	(Austria) Michael Matt	24	45	DNF2	DNQ	7	DNF1	40	16	50	x	x	x	182
10	(Russia) Alexander Khoroshilov	DNS	15	10	18	15	60	DNF1	16	40	x	x	x	174
11	(Italy) Alex Vinatzer	22	DNF1	60	20	DNF1	DNF2	18	40	DNF1	x	x	x	160
12	(Germany) Linus Straßer	32	DNS	36	9	40	14	DNF2	20	DNF2	x	x	x	151
13	(United Kingdom) Dave Ryding	DNF2	14	13	36	9	15	11	32	14	x	x	x	144
	(Switzerland) Loïc Meillard	14	36	DNQ	12	29	26	DNQ	7	20	x	x	x	144
15	(France) Victor Muffat-Jeandet	DNQ	32	22	DNF1	45	18	8	18	DNQ	x	x	x	143
16	(Norway) Timon Haugan	DNQ	DNQ	8	DNQ	DNQ	DNF1	22	9	80	x	x	x	119
17	(France) Jean-Baptiste Grange	DNQ	DNF1	16	14	16	29	DNF2	16	26	x	x	x	117
18	(Sweden) Kristoffer Jakobsen	40	40	DNF1	DNF1	DNF1	DNQ	DNQ	36	DNF1	x	x	x	116
19	(Italy) Simon Maurberger	DNQ	DNF1	26	15	11	8	10	45	DNF1	x	x	x	115
20	(Slovenia) Štefan Hadalin	8	9	15	36	18	5	DNQ	6	13	x	x	x	110
21	(Austria) Fabio Gstrein	DNS	DNQ	14	DNQ	36	22	15	DNF2	18	x	x	x	105
	(Italy) Manfred Mölgg	26	18	32	29	DNS					x	x	x	105
23	(Austria) Adrian Pertl	DNS			DNQ	DNQ	DNF1	32	DNQ	60	x	x	x	92
24	(Norway) Lucas Braathen	DNS	DNF1	40	DNF1	DNF1	DNF1	50	DNF1	DNF2	x	x	x	90
25	(Switzerland) Tanguy Nef	9	DNF1	7	40	DNF2	32	DNF2	DNF1	DNQ	x	x	x	88
	References													

- Winner
- 2nd place
- 3rd place
- DNQ = Did not qualify for run 2
- DNF1 = Did not finish run 1
- DNF2 = Did not finish run 2

Updated at 21 March 2020 after all events.

== See also ==
- 2020 Alpine Skiing World Cup – Men's summary rankings
- 2020 Alpine Skiing World Cup – Men's overall
- 2020 Alpine Skiing World Cup – Men's downhill
- 2020 Alpine Skiing World Cup – Men's super-G
- 2020 Alpine Skiing World Cup – Men's giant slalom
- 2020 Alpine Skiing World Cup – Men's combined
- 2020 Alpine Skiing World Cup – Men's parallel
- World Cup scoring system
