= FIS Alpine Ski Europa Cup =

Top international circuit of alpine skiing competitions

Alpine Skiing Europa Cup
- Genre: Alpine skiing
- Frequency: Annually
- Location: Europe
- Inaugurated: 1971–72
- Most recent: 2025–26
- Organiser: International Ski Federation
- Website: FIS official site

The FIS Alpine Ski Europa Cup is a second level international alpine skiing circuit organized annually by the International Ski Federation (FIS) beginning with the 1971–72 season.

Although held in Europe, these races are also open to non-European skiers.

== Overall podium ==
All rankings and results.

=== Men ===
Season	1st	2nd	3rd
1972	(Italy) Ilario Pegorari	(Austria) Hubert Berchtold	(Italy) Renzo Zandegiacomo
1973	(Italy) Fausto Radici	(Austria) Josef Loidl	(West Germany) Heinz Weixelbaum (Switzerland) Manfred Jakober
1974	(Austria) Christian Witt-Döring	(Austria) Josef Loidl	(Italy) Giulio Corradi
1975	(Italy) Diego Amplatz	(Austria) Kurt Engstler	(Czechoslovakia) Miloslav Sochor
1976	(Italy) Bruno Confortola	(Italy) Sepp Oberfrank	(Switzerland) Christian Hemmi
1977	(People's Republic of Bulgaria) Petăr Popangelov	(Italy) Arnold Senoner	(Switzerland) Jean-Luc Fournier
1978	(Italy) Leonardo David	(Polish People's Republic) Jan Bachleda	(Switzerland) Silvano Meli
1979	(Norway) Jarle Halsnes	(Soviet Union) Aleksandr Zhirov	(Austria) Manfred Brunner
1980	(Italy) Siegfried Kerschbaumer	(Italy) Tiziano Bieler	(Austria) Helmut Gstrein
1981	(Austria) Ernst Riedlsperger	(Switzerland) Peter Lüscher	(Switzerland) Gustav Oehrli
1982	(Austria) Hubert Strolz	(France) Franck Piccard	(Switzerland) Hans Pieren
1983	(United States) Bill Johnson	(France) Franck Piccard	(Austria) Ernst Riedlsperger
1984	(Austria) Dietmar Köhlbichler	(West Germany) Josef Schick	(Austria) Thomas Stangassinger
1985	(Switzerland) Luc Genolet	(Austria) Rudolf Nierlich	(Austria) Roland Pfeifer
1986	(Austria) Rudolf Nierlich	(Sweden) Niklas Lindqvist	(Austria) Helmut Mayer
1987	(Austria) Helmut Mayer	(Austria) Rainer Salzgeber	(Austria) Walter Gugele
1988	(Austria) Konrad Walk	(Socialist Federal Republic of Yugoslavia) Tomaž Čižman	(Austria) Walter Gugele
1989	(Austria) Stephan Eberharter	(Socialist Federal Republic of Yugoslavia) Tomaž Čižman	(Italy) Attilio Barcella
1990	(Italy) Christian Polig	(Italy) Fabio de Crignis	(Austria) Dietmar Köhlbichler
1991	(Germany) Tobias Barnerssoi	(Germany) Markus Eberle	(Switzerland) Marcel Sulliger
1992	(Switzerland) Marcel Sulliger	(Switzerland) Hans Pieren	(Austria) Werner Franz
1993	(Switzerland) Marcel Sulliger	(France) David Pretot	(Italy) Luca Pesando
1994	(Switzerland) Patrick Staub	(Switzerland) Urs Kälin	(France) Yves Dimier
1995	(Austria) Andreas Schifferer	(Austria) Patrick Wirth	(Austria) Kilian Albrecht
1996	(Austria) Hermann Maier	(Austria) Thomas Sykora	(Austria) Kilian Albrecht
1997	(Austria) Stephan Eberharter	(Austria) Christian Greber	(Austria) Heinz Schilchegger
1998	(Austria) Benjamin Raich	(Austria) Patrick Wirth	(Canada) Didier Plaschy
1999	(Austria) Michael Walchhofer	(Austria) Christoph Gruber	(Italy) Ivan Bormolini
2000	(Austria) Christoph Gruber	(Italy) Ivan Bormolini	(Austria) Patrick Wirth
2001	(Switzerland) Ambrosi Hoffman	(Austria) Stephan Görgl	(Finland) Sami Uotila
2002	(Austria) Martin Marinac	(Austria) Stephan Görgl	(Italy) Michael Gufler
2003	(Austria) Norbert Holzknecht	(Austria) Hannes Reichelt	(Norway) Aksel Lund Svindal
2004	(Austria) Matthias Lanzinger	(Austria) Thomas Graggaber	(Italy) Manfred Mölgg
2005	(Norway) Kjetil Jansrud	(Austria) Hannes Reichelt	(Italy) Walter Giraldi
2006	(Italy) Michael Gufler	(Italy) Florian Eisath	(Austria) Georg Streitberger
2007	(Austria) Peter Struger	(Austria) Alexander Koll	(Austria) Matthias Lanzinger
2008	(Austria) Marcel Hirscher	(Italy) Stefan Thanei	(Austria) Florian Schreiber
2009	(Austria) Florian Scheiber	(Austria) Bernard Graf	(Czech Republic) Petr Zahrobsky
2010	(Switzerland) Christian Spescha	(France) Anthony Obert	(Switzerland) Marc Gisin
2011	(France) Alexis Pinturault	(Austria) Bernard Graf	(Italy) Giovanni Borsotti
2012	(Austria) Florian Scheiber	(Germany) Stefan Luitz	(Russia) Sergei Maytakov
2013	(Norway) Aleksander Aamodt Kilde	(France) Victor Muffat-Jeandet	(Austria) Vincent Kriechmayr
2014	(Switzerland) Thomas Tumler	(France) Victor Muffat-Jeandet	(Switzerland) Silvan Zurbriggen
2015	(Italy) Riccardo Tonetti	(Austria) Thomas Mayrpeter	(Austria) Roland Leitinger
2016	(Norway) Bjørnar Neteland	(Austria) Christian Walder	(Italy) Emanuele Buzzi
2017	(Switzerland) Gilles Roulin	(Switzerland) Stefan Rogentin	(Norway) Marcus Monsen
2018	(Austria) Johannes Strolz	(Austria) Dominik Raschner	(Switzerland) Marc Rochat
2019	(Italy) Simon Maurberger	(Switzerland) Stefan Rogentin	(Norway) Timon Haugan
2020	(Norway) Atle Lie McGrath	(Austria) Raphael Haaser	(Austria) Niklas Koeck
2021	(Austria) Maximilian Lahnsteiner	(Austria) Raphael Haaser	(Austria) Dominik Raschner
2022	(Italy) Giovanni Franzoni	(Switzerland) Fadri Janutin	(Switzerland) Ralph Weber
2023	(Switzerland) Josua Mettler	(Switzerland) Marco Kohler	(Switzerland) Arnaud Boisset
2024	(Austria) Manuel Traninger	(Norway) Theodor Brækken	(Austria) Vincent Wieser
2025	(Norway) Oscar Andreas Sandvik	(Switzerland) Lenz Hächler	(France) Alban Elezi Cannaferina
2026	(Switzerland) Lenz Hächler	(Norway) Hans Grahl-Madsen	(Switzerland) Sandro Zurbrügg

=== Women ===
Season	1st	2nd	3rd
1972	(France) Fabienne Serrat	(Austria) Anneliese Liebetseder	(Austria) Irmgard Lukasser
1973	(France) Martine Couttet	(France) Martine Ducroz	(Austria) Ingrid Eberle
1974	(Italy) Elena Matous	(Spain) Conchita Puig	(France) Agnes Vivet-Gros
1975	(Czechoslovakia) Dagmar Kuzmanová	(Austria) Martina Ellmer	(Austria) Marlies Mathis
1976	(Austria) Gabi Hauser	(Italy) Thea Gamper	(Austria) Brigitte Schroll (Austria) Ingrid Eberle
1977	(Liechtenstein) Ursula Konzett	(Austria) Sigrid Totschnig	(Austria) Regina Sackl
1978	(Austria) Christine Loike	(Austria) Gerlinde Strixner	(Austria) Lea Sölkner
1979	(Norway) Bente Dahlum	(Norway) Torill Fjeldstad	(Austria) Heidi Riedler
1980	(Austria) Erika Gfrerer	(Czechoslovakia) Olga Charvátová	(Czechoslovakia) Lenka Vlčková
1981	(Canada) Diane Haight	(Switzerland) Brigitte Oertli	(Spain) Blanca Fernández Ochoa
1982	(West Germany) Sonja Stotz	(Austria) Sieglinde Winkler	(Switzerland) Corinne Eugster
1983	(Switzerland) Christine von Grünigen	(Switzerland) Brigitte Gadient	(Switzerland) Corinne Schmidhauser
1984	(Austria) Anita Wachter	(Austria) Ulrike Maier	(Switzerland) Vreni Schneider
1985	(Austria) Karin Buder	(Switzerland) Regula Betschart	(Switzerland) Chantal Bournissen
1986	(Austria) Manuela Ruef	(Sweden) Catharina Glassér-Bjerner	(Austria) Astrid Geisler
1987	(West Germany) Christa Kinshofer	(Austria) Manuela Ruef	(Switzerland) Christine von Grünigen
1988	(Switzerland) Petra Bernet	(Switzerland) Sandra Burn	(Sweden) Camilla Lundbäck
1989	(Austria) Sabine Ginther	(Austria) Stefanie Schuster	(United States) Monique Pelletier
1990	(Sweden) Agneta Hjorth	(Austria) Elfi Eder	(Norway) Merete Fjeldavlie
1991	(Austria) Alexandra Meissnitzer	(Austria) Manuela Lieb	(Switzerland) Karin Neuenschwander
1992	(Italy) Lara Magoni	(Italy) Morena Gallizio	(New Zealand) Annelise Coberger
1993	(Sweden) Kristina Andersson	(France) Christina Riegel	(France) Sophie Lefranc-Duvillard
1994	(Canada) Melanie Turgeon	(Norway) Anne Berge	(Norway) Andrine Flemmen
1995	(Austria) Karin Köllerer	(Sweden) Kristina Andersson	(Norway) Kristine Kristiansen
1996	(Switzerland) Sylviane Berthod	(Russia) Svetlana Gladishiva	(Austria) Cornelia Meusberger
1997	(Austria) Marianna Salchinger	(Italy) Daniela Ceccarelli	(France) Ingrid Jacquemod
1998	(Austria) Marianna Salchinger	(Norway) Kristine Kristiansen	(Norway) Grete Strøm
1999	(Austria) Silvia Berger	(Austria) Eveline Rohregger	(Italy) Tiziana de Martin Tropanin
2000	(Austria) Selina Heregger	(Austria) Martina Lechner	(Russia) Varvara Zelenskaja
2001	(Austria) Lillian Kummer	(Austria) Eveline Rohregger	(Austria) Ingrid Rumpfhuber
2002	(Germany) Maria Höfl-Riesch	(Austria) Kathrin Wilhelm	(Austria) Katja Wirth
2003	(Austria) Elisabeth Görgl	(Switzerland) Fabienne Suter	(Austria) Michaela Kirchgasser
2004	(Austria) Karin Blaser	(Austria) Kathrin Zettel	(Liechtenstein) Jessica Walter
2005	(Austria) Andrea Fischbacher	(Austria) Michaela Kirchgasser	(Austria) Daniela Zeiser
2006	(Austria) Anna Veith	(Austria) Kathrin Wilhelm	(Switzerland) Rabea Grand
2007	(Austria) Anna Veith	(Slovenia) Marusa Ferk	(Italy) Camilla Alfieri
2008	(Switzerland) Lara Gut	(Germany) Monika Springl	(Austria) Anna Veith
2009	(Austria) Karin Hackl	(Switzerland) Nadja Jnglin-Kamer	(Austria) Stefanie Moser
2010	(Germany) Lena Dürr	(Austria) Ramona Siebenhofer	(Italy) Elena Curtoni
2011	(Austria) Jessica Depauli	(Italy) Lisa Agerer	(Germany) Veronique Hronek
2012	(Italy) Lisa Agerer	(Italy) Enrica Cipriani	(Italy) Sofia Goggia
2013	(Austria) Ramona Siebenhofer	(Italy) Sofia Goggia	(France) Adeline Baud Mugnier
2014	(Switzerland) Michelle Gisin	(Switzerland) Corinne Suter	(Austria) Nina Ortlieb
2015	(Austria) Ricarda Haaser	(Sweden) Ylva Stålnacke	(Switzerland) Jasmine Flury
2016	(Norway) Maren Skjøld	(Austria) Stephanie Brunner	(Italy) Laura Pirovano
2017	(Norway) Kristina Riis-Johannessen	(Norway) Kristin Lysdahl	(Austria) Nadine Fest
2018	(Austria) Nina Ortlieb	(Norway) Kristine Haugen	(Sweden) Lisa Hörnblad
2019	(Austria) Elisabeth Reisinger	(Italy) Roberta Melesi	(Norway) Kaja Norbye
2020	(Austria) Nadine Fest	(Austria) Rosina Schneeberger	(Germany) Jessica Hilzinger
2021	(Norway) Marte Monsen	(Slovenia) Andreja Slokar	(Germany) Jessica Hilzinger
2022	(Austria) Franziska Gritsch	(Switzerland) Juliana Suter	(Austria) Christina Ager
2023	(Austria) Nadine Fest	(Austria) Michaela Heider	(Austria) Christina Ager
2024	(Switzerland) Janine Schmitt	(France) Karen Clément	(Austria) Emily Schöpf
2025	(Austria) Nadine Fest	(Austria) Victoria Olivier	(Switzerland) Janine Schmitt
2026	(Italy) Alice Pazzaglia	(Switzerland) Stefanie Grob	(Germany) Fabiana Dorigo

== See also ==
- FIS Alpine Ski World Cup - the top level circuit of international alpine ski competition
- Nor-Am Cup - the North American equivalent of the Europa Cup
