= 2017–18 FIS Alpine Ski Europa Cup =

Alpine skiing competition

Discipline	Men	Women
Overall	(Austria) Johannes Strolz	(Austria) Nina Ortlieb
Downhill	(Austria) Christopher Neumayer	(Austria) Ariane Rädler
Super-G	(Austria) Christoph Krenn	(Sweden) Lisa Hörnblad
Giant Slalom	(Austria) Dominik Raschner	(Norway) Kristine Gjelsten Haugen (Norway) Thea Louise Stjernesund
Slalom	(Croatia) Matej Vidović	(Switzerland) Aline Danioth
Combined	(Austria) Daniel Danklmaier	(Sweden) Lisa Hörnblad

Competition
Individual	38	35

2017–18 FIS Alpine Ski Europa Cup was the 47th season of the FIS Alpine Ski Europa Cup.

== Standings ==
=== Overall ===
Men

Rank	Skier	Country	Points
1	Johannes Strolz	Austria	917
2	Dominik Raschner	Austria	862
3	Marc Rochat	Switzerland	624
4	Matej Vidović	Croatia	612
5	Marco Odermatt	Switzerland	610
6	Christopher Neumayer	Austria	578
7	Simon Maurberger	Italy	551
8	Daniel Danklmaier	Austria	545
9	Christoph Krenn	Austria	506
10	Urs Kryenbühl	Switzerland	433

Women

Rank	Skier	Country	Points
1	Nina Ortlieb	Austria	949
2	Kristine Gjelsten Haugen	Norway	863
3	Lisa Hornblad	Sweden	798
4	Aline Danioth	Switzerland	765
5	Ariane Raedler	Austria	719
6	Thea Louise Stjernesund	Norway	700
7	Nadine Fest	Austria	663
8	Magdalena Fjallstrom	Sweden	640
9	Franziska Gritsch	Austria	599
10	Rahel Kopp	Switzerland	517

=== Downhill ===
Men

Rank	Skier	Country	Points
1	Christopher Neumayer	Austria	346
2	Werner Heel	Italy	333
3	Urs Kryenbühl	Switzerland	322
4	Adrian Smiseth Sejersted	Norway	266
5	Daniel Hemetsberger	Austria	242

Women

Rank	Skier	Country	Points
1	Ariane Raedler	Austria	376
2	Nina Ortlieb	Austria	311
3	Lisa Hornblad	Sweden	250
4	Juliana Suter	Switzerland	247
5	Martina Rettenwender	Austria	246

=== Super G ===
Men

Rank	Skier	Country	Points
1	Christoph Krenn	Austria	292
2	Gian Luca Barandun	Switzerland	264
3	Stefan Rogentin	Switzerland	262
4	Emanuele Buzzi	Italy	201
5	Daniel Danklmaier	Austria	194

Women

Rank	Skier	Country	Points
1	Lisa Hornblad	Sweden	388
2	Nina Ortlieb	Austria	372
3	Nadine Fest	Austria	285
4	Ariane Raedler	Austria	267
5	Kajsa Vickhoff Lie	Norway	201

=== Giant Slalom ===
Men

Rank	Skier	Country	Points
1	Dominik Raschner	Austria	540
2	Marco Odermatt	Switzerland	500
3	Johannes Strolz	Austria	345
4	Alex Hofer	Italy	317
5	Simon Maurberger	Italy	310

Women

Rank	Skier	Country	Points
1	Kristine Gjelsten Haugen	Norway	446
1	Thea Louise Stjernesund	Norway	446
3	Katharina Liensberger	Austria	380
4	Rahel Kopp	Switzerland	331
5	Magdalena Fjallstrom	Sweden	327

=== Slalom ===
Men

Rank	Skier	Country	Points
1	Matej Vidović	Croatia	612
2	Marc Rochat	Switzerland	560
3	Johannes Strolz	Austria	467
4	Tommaso Sala	Italy	393
5	Dominik Stehle	England	384

Women

Rank	Skier	Country	Points
1	Aline Danioth	Switzerland	552
2	Marina Wallner	England	420
3	Kristine Gjelsten Haugen	Norway	393
4	Charlotta Säfvenberg	Sweden	356
4	Magdalena Fjallstrom	Sweden	313

=== Combined ===
Men

Rank	Skier	Country	Points
1	Daniel Danklmaier	Austria	140
2	Johannes Strolz	Austria	100
2	Marco Pfiffner	Liechtenstein	100
4	Frederic Berthold	Austria	80
5	Christopher Neumayer	Austria	68

Women

Rank	Skier	Country	Points
1	Lisa Hornblad	Sweden	140
2	Chiara Mair	Austria	120
3	Franziska Gritsch	Austria	100
4	Nathalie Gröbli	Switzerland	95
5	Kajsa Vickhoff Lie	Norway	90
