= 2022–23 FIS Alpine Ski Europa Cup =

Alpine skiing competition

Discipline	Men	Women
Overall	(Switzerland) Josua Mettler	(Austria) Nadine Fest
Downhill	(Switzerland) Marco Kohler	(Austria) Nadine Fest
Super-G	(Switzerland) Arnaud Boisset	(Austria) Michaela Heider
Giant slalom	(Switzerland) Josua Mettler	(Sweden) Hilma Lövblom
Slalom	(Norway) Halvor Hilde Gunleiksrud	(Sweden) Moa Boström Mussener

Competition
Locations	17 venues	16 venues
Individual	34 events	36 events
Cancelled	2 events	2 events

The 2022–23 FIS Alpine Ski Europa Cup is the fifty second consecutive Europa Cup season, the second international level competition in alpine skiing.

== Men ==
=== Calendar ===
Stage	Date	Place	Discipline	Winner	Second	Third	Details
1	1 December 2022	(Austria) Gurgl	Giant slalom	(Switzerland) Josua Mettler	(Germany) Fabian Gratz	(United States) George Steffey	
2	2 December 2022	(Austria) Gurgl	Giant slalom	(Belgium) Sam Maes	(France) Loevan Parand	(United States) George Steffey	
3	6 December 2022	(Italy) Santa Caterina	Super-G	(Switzerland) Josua Mettler	(Austria) Andreas Ploier	(Austria) Stefan Rieser	
4	7 December 2022	(Italy) Santa Caterina	Super-G	(Austria) Andreas Ploier	(Andorra) Joan Verdú	(Austria) Stefan Rieser	
5	12 December 2022	(Switzerland) Zinal	Giant slalom	(Switzerland) Livio Simonet	(Italy) Alex Vinatzer	(Norway) Halvor Hilde Gunleiksrud	
6	13 December 2022	(Switzerland) Zinal	Giant slalom	(Switzerland) Livio Simonet	(Switzerland) Josua Mettler	(France) Leo Anguenot	
7	15 December 2022	(Italy) Obereggen	Slalom	(France) Steven Amiez	(Austria) Simon Rüland	(Switzerland) Sandro Simonet	
8	16 December 2022	(Italy) Val di Fassa	Slalom	(Italy) Alex Vinatzer	(Switzerland) Marc Rochat	(France) Steven Amiez	
9	20 December 2022	(Switzerland) St. Moritz	Downhill	(Canada) Cameron Alexander	(Austria) Christopher Neumayer	(Germany) Luis Vogt	
10	22 December 2022	(Switzerland) St. Moritz	Downhill	(Canada) Cameron Alexander	(Switzerland) Gilles Roulin	(Slovenia) Nejc Naraločnik	
11	6 January 2023	(Switzerland) Wengen	Super-G	(Italy) Nicolò Molteni	(Switzerland) Denis Corthay	(Finland) Elian Lehto (France) Florian Loriot	
12	7 January 2023	(Switzerland) Wengen	Super-G	(Switzerland) Gilles Roulin	(Switzerland) Alexis Monney	(Finland) Elian Lehto	
13	12 January 2023	(Italy) Tarvisio	Downhill	(Austria) Stefan Rieser	(Italy) Pietro Zazzi	(Switzerland) Marco Kohler	
14	13 January 2023	(Italy) Tarvisio	Downhill	(Austria) Stefan Rieser	(Switzerland) Marco Kohler	(Italy) Pietro Zazzi	
15	29 January 2023	(France) Orcières-Merlette 1850	Downhill	(Switzerland) Franjo von Allmen	(Switzerland) Marco Kohler	(Slovenia) Nejc Naraločnik	
16	30 January 2023	(France) Orcières-Merlette 1850	Downhill	(Switzerland) Marco Kohler	(Switzerland) Josua Mettler	(Italy) Nicolò Molteni	
17	31 January 2023	(France) Orcières-Merlette 1850	Super-G	(Switzerland) Gilles Roulin	(Austria) Felix Hacker	(Switzerland) Arnaud Boisset	
18	1 February 2023	(France) Orcières-Merlette 1850	Super-G	(Austria) Manuel Traninger	(Switzerland) Christophe Torrent	(Austria) Felix Hacker	
19	6 February 2023	(Italy) Folgaria	Giant slalom	(United States) George Steffey	(Australia) Harry Laidlaw	(Italy) Hannes Zingerle	
20	7 February 2023	(Italy) Folgaria	Giant slalom	(Norway) Fredrik Møller	(Italy) Hannes Zingerle	(Switzerland) Marco Fischbacher	
21	10 February 2023	(Switzerland) Jaun	Slalom	(United States) Jett Seymour	(Switzerland) Sandro Simonet	(Norway) Halvor Hilde Gunleiksrud	
22	11 February 2023	(Switzerland) Jaun	Slalom	(Germany) Linus Witte	(United States) Jett Seymour	(Norway) Halvor Hilde Gunleiksrud	
23	14 February 2023	(Germany) Garmisch-Partenkirchen	Super-G	(Italy) Florian Schieder	(Switzerland) Arnaud Boisset	(Switzerland) Christophe Torrent (Austria) Felix Hacker	
24	15 February 2023	(Germany) Garmisch-Partenkirchen	Super-G	(Switzerland) Arnaud Boisset	(Italy) Florian Schieder	(Italy) Christof Innerhofer	
25	17 February 2023	(Germany) Berchtesgaden	Slalom	(Norway) Halvor Hilde Gunleiksrud	(Norway) Theodor Brækken	(France) Steven Amiez	
26	18 February 2023	(Germany) Berchtesgaden	Slalom	(Norway) Halvor Hilde Gunleiksrud	(Austria) Johannes Strolz	(Switzerland) Tanguy Nef	
	1 March 2023	(Austria) Saalbach-Hinterglemm	Downhill	cancelled			
	2 March 2023	(Austria) Saalbach-Hinterglemm	Downhill	cancelled			
27	7 March 2023	(Sweden) Gällivare	Giant slalom	(Switzerland) Marco Fischbacher	(Norway) Kaspar Kindem	(Italy) Alex Vinatzer	
28	8 March 2023	(Sweden) Gällivare	Giant slalom	(Italy) Hannes Zingerle	(Italy) Alex Vinatzer	(Switzerland) Marco Fischbacher	
29	10 March 2023	(Finland) Levi	Slalom	(Switzerland) Tanguy Nef	(Spain) Joaquim Salarich	(France) Steven Amiez	
30	11 March 2023	(Finland) Levi	Slalom	(Spain) Joaquim Salarich	(Switzerland) Tanguy Nef	(Norway) Halvor Hilde Gunleiksrud	
31	13 March 2023	(Norway) Narvik	Giant slalom	(Norway) Fredrik Møller	(Austria) Joshua Sturm	(Switzerland) Josua Mettler	
32	14 March 2023	(Norway) Narvik	Slalom	(Spain) Joaquim Salarich	(France) Steven Amiez	(France) Hugo Desgrippes	
33	17 March 2023	(Norway) Narvik	Downhill	(Liechtenstein) Marco Pfiffner	(Slovenia) Nejc Naraločnik	(Germany) Jacob Schramm	
34	19 March 2023	(Norway) Narvik	Super-G	(Switzerland) Gilles Roulin	(Switzerland) Arnaud Boisset	(France) Léo Ducros	

=== Rankings ===
==== Overall ====
Rank	after all 35 races	Points
1	(Switzerland) Josua Mettler	856
2	(Switzerland) Marco Kohler	602
3	(Switzerland) Arnaud Boisset	560
4	(Norway) Halvor Hilde Gunleiksrud	535
5	(Switzerland) Giles Roulin	534

==== Downhill ====
Rank	after all 7 races	Points
1	(Switzerland) Marco Kohler	406
2	(Switzerland) Franjo von Allmen	289
3	(Slovenia) Nejc Naraločnik	279
4	(Austria) Stefan Rieser	234
5	(Italy) Pietro Zazzi	231

==== Super-G ====
Rank	after all 9 races	Points
1	(Switzerland) Arnaud Boisset	458
2	(Switzerland) Gilles Roulin	433
3	(Italy) Florian Schieder	383
4	(Austria) Andreas Ploier	301
5	(Switzerland) Christophe Torrent	268

==== Giant slalom ====
Rank	after all 9 races	Points
1	(Switzerland) Josua Mettler	396
2	(Switzerland) Livio Simonet	387
3	(Switzerland) Marco Fischbacher	369
4	(Italy) Hannes Zingerle	365
5	(Norway) Fredrik Møller	347

==== Slalom ====
Rank	after all 9 races	Points
1	(Norway) Halvor Hilde Gunleiksrud	397
2	(France) Steven Amiez	374
3	(Spain) Joaquim Salarich	370
4	(Austria) Simon Rueland	290
4	(Switzerland) Tanguy Nef	290

== Women ==
=== Calendar ===
Stage	Date	Place	Discipline	Winner	Second	Third	Details
1	28 November 2022	(Austria) Mayrhofen	Giant slalom	(France) Doriane Escané	(United States) Stella Johansson	(France) Clarisse Brèche (Sweden) Moa Boström Mussener	
2	29 November 2022	(Austria) Mayrhofen	Slalom	(Sweden) Moa Boström Mussener	(Italy) Lucrezia Lorenzi	(Italy) Vera Tschurtschenthaler	
3	1 December 2022	(Switzerland) Zinal	Super-G	(France) Karen Smadja-Clément	(Austria) Michaela Heider	(Austria) Sabrina Maier	
4	2 December 2022	(Switzerland) Zinal	Super-G	(Switzerland) Janine Schmitt	(Austria) Michaela Heider	(France) Karen Smadja-Clément	
5	5 December 2022	(Switzerland) Zinal	Giant slalom	(Italy) Asja Zenere	(Germany) Jessica Hilzinger	(France) Doriane Escané	
6	6 December 2022	(Switzerland) Zinal	Giant slalom	(Germany) Jessica Hilzinger	(Poland) Magdalena Łuczak	(Austria) Elisabeth Kappaurer	
7	13 December 2022	(Italy) Ponte di Legno	Giant slalom	(Italy) Asja Zenere	(Austria) Elisabeth Kappaurer	(Switzerland) Viviane Härri	
8	14 December 2022	(Italy) Ponte di Legno	Giant slalom	(Italy) Asja Zenere	(Italy) Elisa Platino	(Sweden) Hilma Lövblom	
9	16 December 2022	(Italy) Valle Aurina	Slalom	(United States) Paula Moltzan	(Austria) Lisa Hörhager	(Sweden) Moa Boström Mussener	
10	17 December 2022	(Italy) Valle Aurina	Slalom	(Switzerland) Nicole Good	(Sweden) Moa Boström Mussener	(Sweden) Emelie Henning	
	19 December 2022	(Italy) Passo San Pellegrino	Downhill	cancelled			
	20 December 2022	(Italy) Passo San Pellegrino	Downhill	cancelled			
11	11 January 2023	(Austria) Zauchensee	Downhill	(Austria) Sabrina Maier	(Austria) Magdalena Egger	(Austria) Michelle Niederwieser	
12	11 January 2023	(Austria) Zauchensee	Downhill	(Austria) Vanessa Nussbaumer	(Austria) Christina Ager	(Switzerland) Delia Durrer	
13	12 January 2023	(Austria) Zauchensee	Super-G	(Austria) Michaela Heider	(Austria) Sabrina Maier	(Austria) Michelle Niederwieser	
14	14 January 2023	(Italy) Pozza di Fassa	Slalom	(Sweden) Cornelia Öhlund	(Italy) Beatrice Sola	(Switzerland) Aline Danioth	
15	15 January 2023	(Italy) Pozza di Fassa	Slalom	(Sweden) Cornelia Öhlund	(Switzerland) Aline Danioth	(Japan) Asa Ando	
16	27 January 2023	(France) Vaujany	Slalom	(France) Doriane Escané	(Norway) Bianca Bakke Westhoff	(Sweden) Estelle Alphand	
17	28 January 2023	(France) Vaujany	Slalom	(Sweden) Cornelia Öhlund	(Norway) Andrine Mårstøl	(Italy) Beatrice Sola	
18	1 February 2023	(France) Châtel	Downhill	(Austria) Christina Ager	(Austria) Nadine Fest	(Switzerland) Juliana Suter	
19	2 February 2023	(France) Châtel	Downhill	(Switzerland) Delia Durrer	(Austria) Christina Ager	(Austria) Nadine Fest	
20	3 February 2023	(France) Châtel	Super-G	(Austria) Christina Ager	(Austria) Michelle Niederwieser	(Switzerland) Stephanie Jenal	
21	6 February 2023	(Italy) Sarntal	Super-G	(Austria) Nadine Fest	(Germany) Katrin Hirtl-Stanggaßinger	(Austria) Christina Ager	
22	7 February 2023	(Italy) Sarntal	Super-G	(Austria) Christina Ager	(Austria) Elisabeth Reisinger	(Austria) Nadine Fest	
23	9 February 2023	(Slovenia) Maribor	Giant slalom	(Switzerland) Melanie Meillard	(Sweden) Hilma Lövblom	(Austria) Elisabeth Kappaurer	
24	10 February 2023	(Slovenia) Maribor	Giant slalom	(Switzerland) Melanie Meillard	(Italy) Elisa Platino	(Slovenia) Neja Dvornik	
25	13 February 2023	(Bosnia and Herzegovina) Sarajevo	Super-G	(Austria) Christina Ager	(Austria) Michaela Heider	(Austria) Nadine Fest	
26	13 February 2023	(Bosnia and Herzegovina) Sarajevo	Super-G	(Austria) Michelle Niederwieser	(Austria) Nadine Fest	(Austria) Sandra Absmann	
27	18 February 2023	(Switzerland) Crans Montana	Downhill	(Austria) Nadine Fest	(Bosnia and Herzegovina) Elvedina Muzaferija	(Switzerland) Stephanie Jenal	
28	19 February 2023	(Switzerland) Crans Montana	Downhill	(Austria) Nadine Fest	(United States) Keely Cashman	(Austria) Sabrina Maier	
29	4 March 2023	(Sweden) Gällivare	Giant slalom	(Sweden) Hilma Lövblom	(Austria) Elisabeth Kappaurer	(France) Doriane Escané	
30	5 March 2023	(Sweden) Gällivare	Giant slalom	(Sweden) Hilma Lövblom	(Austria) Elisabeth Kappaurer	(Norway) Marte Monsen	
31	7 March 2023	(Finland) Suomu	Slalom	(France) Marie Lamure	(Norway) Andrine Mårstøl	(Sweden) Moa Boström Mussener	
32	8 March 2023	(Finland) Suomu	Slalom	(France) Marie Lamure	(Italy) Anita Gulli	(Norway) Andrine Mårstøl	
33	13 March 2023	(Norway) Narvik	Giant slalom	(Austria) Michaela Heider	(Austria) Elisabeth Kappaurer	(Switzerland) Melanie Meillard	
34	14 March 2023	(Norway) Narvik	Slalom	(France) Marie Lamure	(Switzerland) Nicole Good	(Switzerland) Melanie Meillard	
35	17 March 2023	(Norway) Narvik	Downhill	(France) Camille Cerutti	(Austria) Nadine Fest	(Canada) Stefanie Fleckenstein (Austria) Lena Wechner	
36	18 March 2023	(Norway) Narvik	Super-G	(Austria) Michaela Heider	(Austria) Michelle Niederwieser	(France) Karen Smadja-Clément	

=== Rankings ===
==== Overall ====
Rank	after all 36 races	Points
1	(Austria) Nadine Fest	836
2	(Austria) Michaela Heider	818
3	(Austria) Christina Ager	789
4	(Sweden) Moa Boström Mussener	683
5	(Austria) Sabrina Maier	674

==== Downhill ====
Rank	after all 7 races	Points
1	(Austria) Nadine Fest	506
2	(Austria) Christina Ager	379
3	(Austria) Sabrina Maier	331
4	(Switzerland) Delia Durrer	306
5	(Austria) Vanessa Nussbaumer	302

==== Super-G ====
Rank	after all 9 races	Points
1	(Austria) Michaela Heider	557
2	(Austria) Michelle Niederwieser	470
3	(Austria) Christina Ager	410
4	(Austria) Sabrina Maier	343
5	(Austria) Nadine Fest	314

==== Giant slalom ====
Rank	after all 10 races	Points
1	(Sweden) Hilma Lövblom	516
2	(Austria) Elisabeth Kappaurer	480
3	(Italy) Elisa Platino	440
4	(Switzerland) Melanie Meillard	406
5	(France) Doriane Escané	390

==== Slalom ====
Rank	after all 10 races	Points
1	(Sweden) Moa Boström Mussener	477
2	(Italy) Beatrice Sola	419
3	(Sweden) Cornelia Öhlund	410
4	(Norway) Bianca Bakke Westhoff	390
5	(France) Marie Lamure	374

== Podium table by nation ==
Table showing the Europa Cup podium places (gold–1st place, silver–2nd place, bronze–3rd place) by the countries represented by the athletes.

Rank	Nation	Gold	Silver	Bronze	Total
1	Switzerland	18	15	15	48
2	Austria	17	24	16	57
3	France	8	2	12	22
4	Italy	7	10	7	24
5	Sweden	6	2	6	14
6	Norway	4	5	6	15
7	United States	3	3	2	8
8	Germany	2	3	2	7
9	Spain	2	1	0	3
10	Canada	2	0	1	3
11	Belgium	1	0	0	1
11	Liechtenstein	1	0	0	1
13	Slovenia	0	1	3	4
14	Andorra	0	1	0	1
14	Australia	0	1	0	1
14	Bosnia and Herzegovina	0	1	0	1
14	Poland	0	1	0	1
18	Finland	0	0	2	2
19	Japan	0	0	1	1
Totals (19 entries)		71	70	73	214
