= Star team for the children =

Star Team for the Children
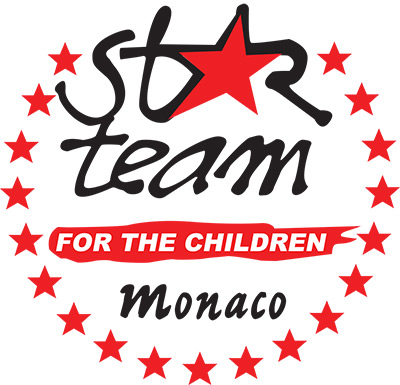
- Founded: 1993; 33 years ago
- Founder: Albert II, Prince of Monaco; Mauro Serra
- Type: AS Sport Association
- Location: Monaco

The Star Team for the Children, officially known as A.S. Star Team for the Children, commonly called Star Team, is a football team made up of sports and show business champions founded in 1993 by Prince Albert II of Monaco and Mauro Serra, with the aim of raising funds to help children around the world. In 1996 the Monegasque government recognized the status of Sports Association.

Since its founding, the Star Team has organized over 100 sporting and social events, the most important of which is the charity match against the national team. This game takes place on the Tuesday of the Monaco GP week and attracts many worldwide personalities from the world of entertainment. The event is broadcast worldwide by Sky Group and available in 17 countries. Other events organized every year are the World Stars Golf Charity and the World Star Ski.

== Star Team Honorary Members ==
Prince Albert II of Monaco - Honorary President and Captain

Mauro Serra - Executive Presidente and General Manager

Andrea Casiraghi - Son of Caroline, Princess of Hanover

Pierre Casiraghi - Son of Caroline, Princess of Hanover

Louis Ducret - Son of Princess Stéphanie of Monaco

Emanuele Filiberto of Savoia

Altobelli Alessandro

Barthez Fabian

Bayliss Troy

Belmondo Stefania

Beretta Olivier

Bettini Paolo

Biaggi Max

Biaggi Thomas

Bonini Massimo

Boonen Tom

Bruno Kernen

Bruno Senoner

Bubka Sergej

Caffi Alex

Caldarelli Andrea

Capirossi Loris

Cappellini Guido

Ceccarelli Daniela

Chechi Yuri

Chiappucci Claudio

Christof Innerhofer

Cobos José

Colombo Gabriele

Compagnoni Deborah

Corser Troy

Cova Alberto

Cristian Zorzi

David Ginola

De Chiesa Paolo

De Radigues Didier

Denis Karbon

Deschamps Didier

Dessailly Marcel

Di Franco Fabrice

Dominik Paris

Dossena Giuseppe

Ettori Antoine

Ettori Jean-Luc

Ezio Gianola

Fill Peter

Fin-Crisian Jagge

Franz Klammer

Frederick Dehu

Fredericks Franck

Fritz Strobl

Gabriele Tarquini

Gattuso Sebastien

Gentil Pascal

Ghedina Kristian

Gotti Ivan

Gros Piero

Gunde Svan

Gustavo Thoni

Hannes Trinkl

Hans-Peter Buraas

Herbert Johnny

Ingemar Stenmark

Ismael Triki

Johan Nillson

Johanna Schnarf

Johnny Cecotto

Jose Cobos

Jure Kosir

Karl Unterkircher

Kjetil-Andre Aamodt

Kristensen Tom

Kristian Ghedina

Kubica Robert

Lasse Kjus

Lemarie Patrick

Lisa Agerer

Liuzzi Vitantonio

Luca Filippi

Magdalena Forsberg

Manfred Moelgg

Manuela Moelgg

Marc Girardelli

Massimiliano Blardone

Mengual Guy

Merlin Alessandra

Montoya Juan Pablo

Morbidelli Gianni

Mustapha Adji

Nargiso Diego

Nono Hilali

Novak Djokovic

Olivier Dacourt

Ortelli Stéphane

Pane Mauro

Panetta Francesco

Panizzi Gilles

Pantano Giorgio

Parsson Anja

Patrese Riccardo

Perez Bibiana

Pernilla Wiberg

Piccione Clivio

Piller Cotrer Pietro

Pirro Emanuele

Pizzonia Antonio

Pozzato Filippo

Puel Claude

Puzar Alex

Rebellin Davide

Reich Christian

Rey Patrick

Rijkaard Franck

Rocca Giorgio

Rominger Tony

Rovera Alberto

Runggaldier Peter

Sainz Carlos

Sandolo Sophie

Scarpa Massimo

Schwarz Armin

Servelle Patrice

Simone Marco

Smigun Christine

Sonny Anderson

Tomba Alberto

Trulli Jarno

Vaisteins Romans

Verena Stuffer

Werner Perathoner

Zabel Erik

Zanardi Alex

Zito Gustavo
