= 2018 Alpine Skiing World Cup – Women's combined =

Alpine ski discipline year standings

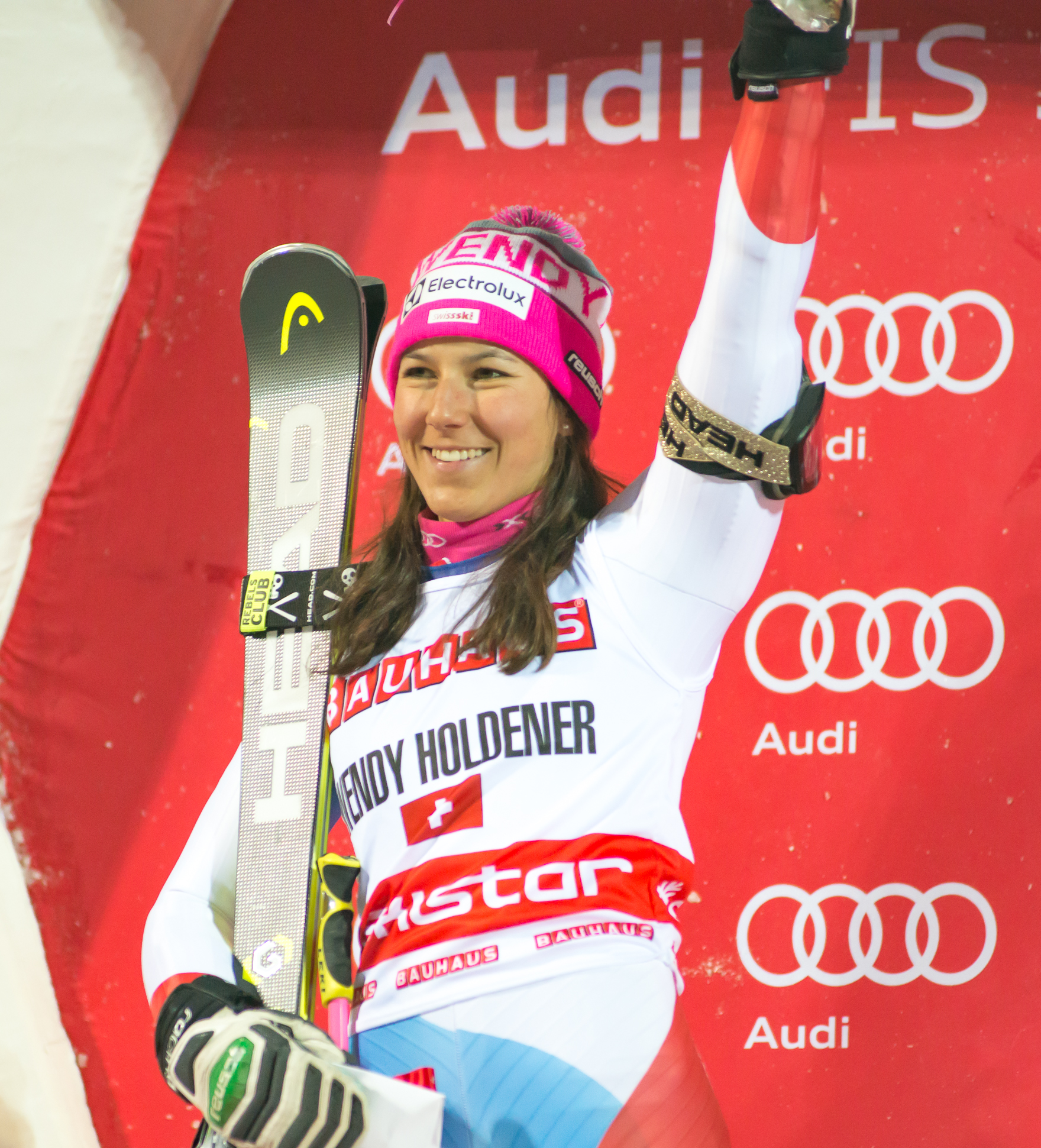
2018 Women's Combined World Cup: Wendy Holdener of Switzerland, season champion; 2018 Women's World Cup; Overall • downhill • super-G; giant slalom • slalom • combined
Previous: 2017	Next: 2019

The women's combined in the 2018 FIS Alpine Skiing World Cup involved two events. Wendy Holdener of Switzerland won the first and then won the season championship and the crystal globe that accompanied it (which was awarded despite only two races being held).

The season was interrupted by the 2018 Winter Olympics from 12-24 February 2018 at Yongpyong Alpine Centre (slalom and giant slalom) at the Alpensia Sports Park in PyeongChang and the Jeongseon Alpine Centre (speed events) in Jeongseon, South Korea. The women's combined was held on 22 February.

At this time, combined races were not included in the season finals, which were held in 2018 in Åre, Sweden.

== Standings ==
#	Skier	26 Jan 2017; Lenzerheide (Switzerland)	4 Mar 2018; Crans-Montana (Switzerland)	Tot.
	(Switzerland) Wendy Holdener	100	50	150
2	(Switzerland) Michelle Gisin	29	80	109
3	(Italy) Federica Brignone	DNF2	100	100
4	(Italy) Marta Bassino	80	8	88
5	(Slovenia) Ana Bucik	60	6	66
6	(Austria) Ramona Siebenhofer	45	20	65
7	(Slovakia) Petra Vlhová	DNS	60	60
8	(Serbia) Nevena Ignjatović	40	15	55
9	(Switzerland) Denise Feierabend	32	22	54
10	(United States) Lindsey Vonn	50	DNS	50
11	(Austria) Stephanie Brunner	DNF1	45	45
12	(Switzerland) Priska Nufer	18	26	44
13	(Slovenia) Maruša Ferk	26	16	42
14	(Switzerland) Rahel Kopp	5	36	41
15	(Norway) Ragnhild Mowinckel	DNF2	40	40
16	(France) Anne-Sophie Barthet	36	DNS	36
17	(Italy) Sofia Goggia	DNS	32	32
18	(Austria) Ricarda Haaser	DNF2	29	29
19	(Italy) Nicol Delago	15	13	28
20	(Austria) Christina Ager	20	7	27
21	(France) Romane Miradoli	26	DNS	26
22	(Austria) Nadine Fest	DNS	24	24
23	(Norway) Kajsa Vickhoff Lie	13	10	23
24	(Switzerland) Lara Gut	22	DNS	22
25	(France) Laura Gauché	14	5	19
	References			

- Winner
- 2nd place
- 3rd place
- DNF1 = Did Not Finish run 1
- DNF2 = Did Not Finish run 2
- DNS = Did Not Start
- Updated at 14 March 2018, after all events.

== See also ==
- 2018 Alpine Skiing World Cup – Women's summary rankings
- 2018 Alpine Skiing World Cup – Women's overall
- 2018 Alpine Skiing World Cup – Women's downhill
- 2018 Alpine Skiing World Cup – Women's super-G
- 2018 Alpine Skiing World Cup – Women's giant slalom
- 2018 Alpine Skiing World Cup – Women's slalom
