= Kristine Gjelsten Haugen =

Norwegian alpine skier (born 1992)

Kristine Gjelsten Haugen (born 24 August 1992) is a retired Norwegian alpine skier.

She competed at the 2009 Junior World Championships, 2010, 2011 and 2012 Junior World Championships with a fourth place at best, in the giant slalom in 2012. She made her FIS Alpine Ski World Cup debut in December 2016 in Semmering, collecting her first World Cup points with a 26th-place finish in January 2017 in Flachau. She broke both the top-20 and the top-10 at the same time with a 10th-place finish in October 2018 in Sölden. The same season she competed at the 2019 World Championships, managing a 29th place in the slalom. Her last race was a fifth place in slalom at the Norwegian Championships in March 2019.

She represented the sports club Lommedalens IL. She is a sister of Leif Kristian Nestvold-Haugen and niece of Bjørn Rune Gjelsten.

== Personal life ==
Kristine Gjelsten Haugen is from Lommedalen, Norway. She studied business and real estate development in the United States at the University of Denver and graduated in 2016. As of 2021 she works to lessen the environmental footprint for the estate owner and management company Veidekke, Ferd and Fabritius.
