= World Junior Alpine Skiing Championships 2010 =

International skiing competition

The World Junior Alpine Skiing Championships 2010 were the 29th World Junior Alpine Skiing Championships, held between 30 January and 5 February 2010 in Les Houches, Megève and Les Plandras, France.

== Medal winners ==
=== Men's events ===
Event	Gold		Silver		Bronze	
Downhill	Mattia Casse; Italy	1:19.32	Frederic Berthold; Austria	1:19.43	Boštjan Kline; Slovenia	1:19.45
Super-G	Maxence Muzaton; France	1:29.71	Espen Lysdahl; Norway	1:29.94	Mattia Casse; Italy	1:30.18
Giant Slalom	Mathieu Faivre; France	2:17.55	Stefan Luitz; Germany	2:18.32	Espen Lysdahl; Norway	2:18.51
Slalom	Reto Schmidiger; Switzerland	1:30.97	Lukas Tippelreither; Austria	1:31.80	Sergei Maitakov; Russia	1:32.01
Combined	Colby Granstrom; United States	35.04 points	Jacopo di Ronco; Italy	62.50	Kelby Halbert; Canada	62.63

=== Women's events ===
Event	Gold		Silver		Bronze	
Downhill	Jéromine Géroudet; France	1:20.89	Jessica Depauli; Austria	1:21.88	Lotte Smiseth Sejersted; Norway	1:22.05
Super-G	Marine Gauthier; France	1:32.21	Jéromine Géroudet; France	1:32.29	Michelle Morik; Austria	1:32.58
Giant Slalom	Mona Løseth; Norway	1:38.34	Federica Brignone; Italy; Lena Dürr; Germany	1:38.71	Not awarded	
Slalom	Christina Geiger; Germany	1:34.47	Mona Løseth; Norway	1:36.04	Sara Hector; Sweden	1:36.82
Combined	Mona Løseth; Norway	38.85 points	Lotte Smiseth Sejersted; Norway	44.56	Jessica Depauli; Austria	63.34

- Two silver medals were awarded in the Giant Slalom.
