= Boštjan Kline =

Slovenian alpine skier (born 1991)

Personal information
- Born: 9 March 1991 (age 35) Maribor, Slovenia

Skiing career
- Sport: Alpine skiing
- Club: SK Branik Maribor
- Disciplines: Downhill, Super-G
World Cup debut
11 December 2009 (age 19)

Olympics
- Teams: 1 – (2018)
- Medals: 0

World Championships
- Teams: 5 – (2013–2021)
- Medals: 0

World Cup
- Seasons: 9 – (2012–13, 2015–21)
- Wins: 1 – (1 DH)
- Podiums: 3 – (2 DH, 1 SG)
- Overall titles: 0 – (20h in 2017)
- Discipline titles: 0 – (10th in DH, 2017)
Medal record
Men's alpine skiing
Representing Slovenia
Junior World Championships
Gold medal – first place	2011 Crans-Montana	Downhill
Gold medal – first place	2011 Crans-Montana	Super-G
Bronze medal – third place	2010 Megève	Downhill

Boštjan Kline (born 9 March 1991) is a Slovenian World Cup alpine ski racer, and specializes in the speed events of downhill and super-G. He has competed in four World Championships, and the 2018 Winter Olympics.

== Career ==
Kline made his World Cup debut in December 2009 in a super combined at Val d'Isere, France. He competed for Slovenia at the 2015 World Championships. He failed to finish the super-G, finished 33rd in the downhill, and was disqualified during the slalom run of the super combined.

In January 2016, Kline attained his first podium, a second-place finish in downhill at Garmisch-Partenkirchen, Germany, finishing behind Aleksander Aamodt Kilde. About a month later, he achieved a second place podium finish in Hinterstoder in the super G, again finishing behind Kilde.

He gained his first World Cup victory in Norway at Kvitfjell in a downhill in February 2017.

== World Cup results ==
Season	Age	Overall	Slalom	Giant slalom	Super-G	Downhill	Combined
2010	18	—	—	—	—	—	—
2011	19	130	—	—	61	45	—
2012	20	135	—	—	54	—	—
2013	21	120	—	—	47	50	—
2014	22						
2015	23	101	—	—	44	39	—
2016	24	24	—	—	14	17	30
2017	25	20	—	—	11	10	—
2018	26	71	—	—	26	36	28
2019	27	86	—	—	22	57	—
2020	28	126	—	—	33	—	—
2021	29	81	—	—	32	29	—

Standings through 17 January 2021

=== Race podiums ===
- 1 win – (1 DH)
- 3 podiums – (2 DH, 1 SG)

Season	Date	Location	Discipline	Place
2016	30 Jan 2016	Garmisch-Partenkirchen, Germany	Downhill	2nd
2016	27 Feb 2016	Hinterstoder, Austria	Super-G	2nd
2017	24 Feb 2017	Kvitfjell, Norway	Downhill	1st

== World Championship results ==
Year	Age	Slalom	Giant slalom	Super-G	Downhill	Combined
2013	21	—	—	30	DNF	DSQ1
2015	23	—	—	DNF	33	DSQ1
2017	25	—	—	DNF	7	—
2019	27	—	—	DNF	20	DNF2
2021	29			24		

== Olympic results ==
Year	Age	Slalom	Giant slalom	Super-G	Downhill	Combined
2018	26	—	—	10	27	DNS2
