= Lotte Smiseth Sejersted =

Norwegian alpine skier (born 1991)

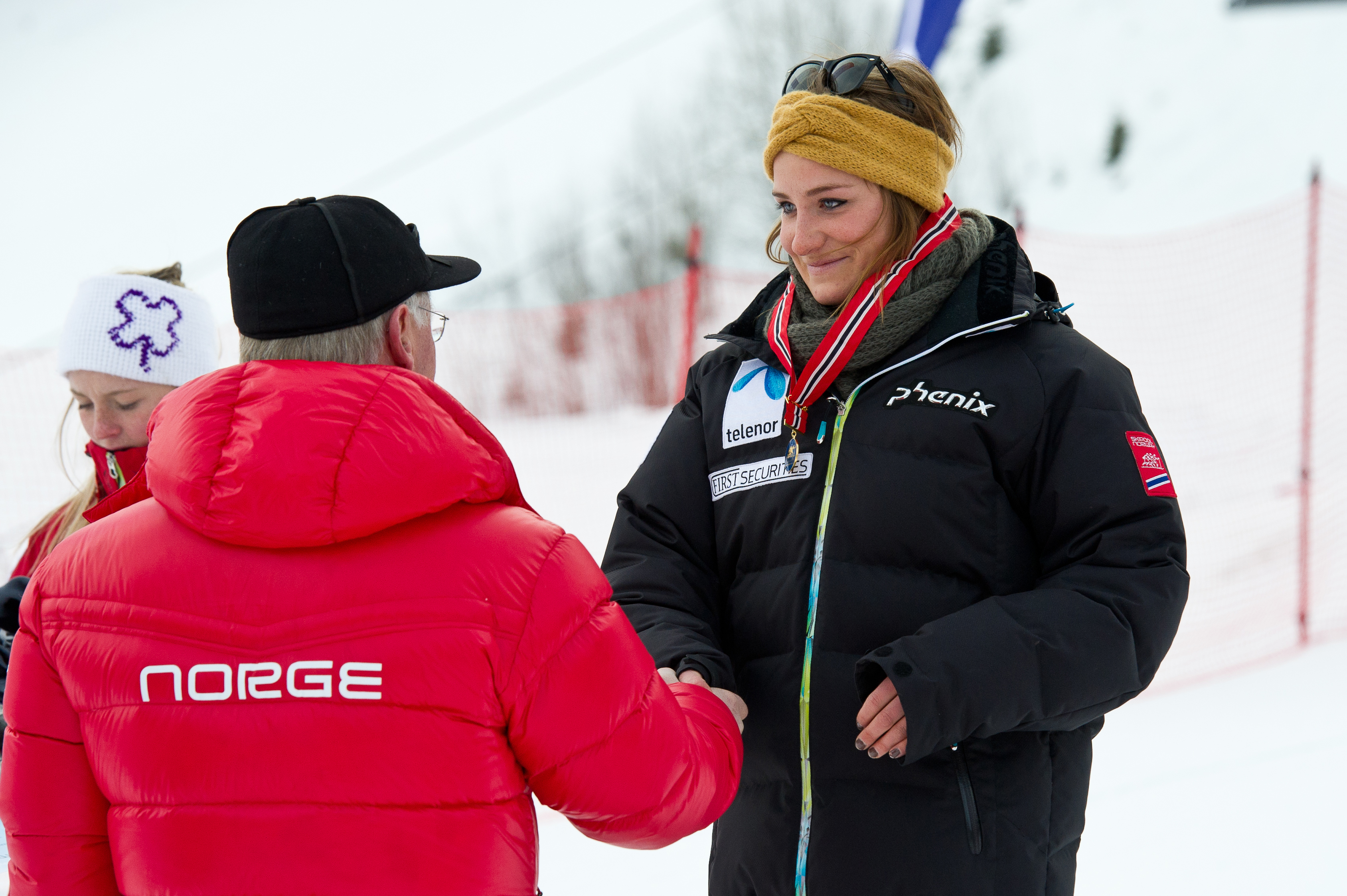

Personal information
- Born: 5 March 1991 (age 35) Bærum, Norway
- Height: 169 cm (5 ft 7 in) (2014)
- Family: Adrian Smiseth Sejersted (brother)

Skiing career
- Country: Norway
- Sport: Alpine skiing
- Club: Stabæk IF
- Retired: April 2017 (age 26)
- Disciplines: Downhill, super-G, giant slalom, slalom, combined
- World Cup debut: 24 October 2009 (age 18)

Olympics
- Teams: 1 − (2014)
- Medals: 0

World Championships
- Teams: 2 − (2011, 2013)
- Medals: 0

World Cup
- Seasons: 7 − (2010–2016)
- Podiums: 0
- Overall titles: 0 – (38th in 2014)
- Discipline titles: 0 – (12th in AC, 2013)
Medal record
Women's alpine skiing
Representing Norway
World Junior Championships
Gold medal – first place	2011 Crans-Montana	Downhill
Silver medal – second place	2009 Garmisch-Partenkirchen	Downhill
Silver medal – second place	2010 Les Houches	Combined
Bronze medal – third place	2010 Les Houches	Downhill
- Updated on 9 March 2026

Lotte Smiseth Sejersted (born 5 March 1991) is a Norwegian former alpine skier.

She won a silver medal at the 2009 Junior World Alpine Skiing Championships in Garmisch-Partenkirchen, in the downhill event. She took another two medals at the 2010 World Junior Championships: a silver in the combined and a bronze in the downhill. In 2011, she won gold in the downhill at the Junior World Alpine Skiing Championships in Crans Montana.

She made her World Cup debut in October 2009 in Sölden, but was disqualified. The same happened in two races in Åre in mid-December 2009, before she collected her first World Cup points with a 28th place in the super combined event in Val-d'Isère. She competed at the 2011 and 2013 Alpine Skiing World Championships. At the 2011 World Alpine Skiing Championships in Garmisch-Partenkirchen, Smiseth Sejersted set the fastest time in the second downhill training but during the main event she lost one ski and couldn't finish the course. However she also secured her best senior World Championship result that year, finishing tenth in the combined competition. At the 2014 Winter Olympics in Sochi, Russia, she finished sixth in the downhill. Her best results in the FIS Alpine Ski World Cup were a pair of fifth places which were obtained in downhills in Lenzerheide in March 2011 and Val-d'Isère in December 2013. She took a total of 16 national titles between 2007 and 2014, including five in downhill, four in Super-G, four in combined, two in giant slalom and one in slalom: in 2011 she won all five titles in the same year.

In January 2016 Smiseth Sejersted crashed in a World Cup downhill race in Zauchensee, suffering ligament injuries which ruled her out for the rest of the season. Subsequently in April 2017 she announced her retirement from competition.

She represented the sports club Stabæk IF, and hails from Hosle. She is the older sister of Adrian Smiseth Sejersted. She attended the Norwegian College of Elite Sport.

== World Cup results ==
=== Season standings ===
Season
Season	Age	Overall	Slalom	Giant slalom	Super-G	Downhill	Combined
2010	19	107	—	—	41	45	—
2011	20	66	—	—	45	29	23
2012	21	50	41	—	28	34	13
2013	22	49	—	33	34	29	12
2014	23	38	—	—	24	17	—
2015	24	80	—	—	53	33	—
2016	25	72	—	—	29	38	35

=== Top-ten results ===
- 0 podiums, 8 top tens

Season
Season	Date	Location	Discipline	Place
2011	16 March 2011	Lenzerheide, Switzerland	Downhill	5th
2011	29 January 2012	St. Moritz, Switzerland	Combined	6th
2013	24 February 2013	Méribel, France	Combined	9th
2014	30 November 2013	Beaver Creek, United States	Super-G	10th
2014	21 December 2013	Val d'Isère, France	Downhill	5th
2014	11 January 2014	Zauchensee, Austria	Downhill	9th
2014	2 March 2014	Crans-Montana, Switzerland	Downhill	6th
2016	6 December 2015	Lake Louise, Canada	Super-G	5th

== World Championship results ==
Year
Year	Age	Slalom	Giant slalom	Super-G	Downhill	Combined
2011	20	—	—	DNF	DNF	10
2013	22	—	30	13	21	DNF2

== Olympic results ==
Year
Year	Age	Slalom	Giant slalom	Super-G	Downhill	Combined
2014	23	—	23	14	6	DNF2
