= FIS Alpine World Ski Championships 2021 – Men's super-G =

Men's super-G at the FIS Alpine World Ski Championships 2021
- Location: Cortina d'Ampezzo, Italy
- Date: 11 February
- Competitors: 55 from 24 nations
- Winning time: 1:19.41

Medalists
| gold medal | Vincent Kriechmayr | Austria |
| silver medal | Romed Baumann | Germany |
| bronze medal | Alexis Pinturault | France |

Men's Super-G
- Location: Vertigine (vertigo); Cortina d'Ampezzo, Italy
- Vertical: 630 m (2,067 ft)
- Top elevation: 2,190 m (7,185 ft)
- Base elevation: 1,560 m (5,118 ft)
- Longest run: 2.075 km (1.29 mi)

The Men's super-G competition at the FIS Alpine World Ski Championships 2021 was scheduled for 9 February. It was postponed and ran on 11 February 2021.

== Results ==
The race started at 13:00 CET (UTC+1) under clear skies. The air temperature was −1 °C (30 °F) at the starting gate and −4 °C (25 °F) at the finish.

| Rank | Bib | Name | Country | Time | Diff |
|---|---|---|---|---|---|
| 1st place, gold medalist(s) | 5 | Vincent Kriechmayr | Austria | 1:19.41 | — |
| 2nd place, silver medalist(s) | 20 | Romed Baumann | Germany | 1:19.48 | +0.07 |
| 3rd place, bronze medalist(s) | 10 | Alexis Pinturault | France | 1:19.79 | +0.38 |
| 4 | 28 | Brodie Seger | Canada | 1:19.83 | +0.42 |
| 5 | 8 | Dominik Paris | Italy | 1:19.96 | +0.55 |
| 6 | 9 | Matthias Mayer | Austria | 1:20.01 | +0.60 |
| 7 | 26 | Matthieu Bailet | France | 1:20.13 | +0.72 |
| 8 | 17 | Travis Ganong | United States | 1:20.16 | +0.75 |
| 9 | 13 | Andreas Sander | Germany | 1:20.29 | +0.88 |
| 10 | 18 | Beat Feuz | Switzerland | 1:20.34 | +0.93 |
| 11 | 7 | Marco Odermatt | Switzerland | 1:20.37 | +0.96 |
| 12 | 11 | Kjetil Jansrud | Norway | 1:20.45 | +1.04 |
| 13 | 6 | Emanuele Buzzi | Italy | 1:20.71 | +1.30 |
| 14 | 4 | James Crawford | Canada | 1:20.76 | +1.35 |
| 15 | 31 | Jared Goldberg | United States | 1:20.85 | +1.44 |
| 16 | 22 | Simon Jocher | Germany | 1:21.04 | +1.63 |
| 17 | 38 | Henrik Røa | Norway | 1:21.15 | +1.74 |
| 18 | 21 | Jeffrey Read | Canada | 1:21.20 | +1.79 |
| 19 | 24 | Matteo Marsaglia | Italy | 1:21.24 | +1.83 |
| 20 | 42 | Jan Zabystřan | Czech Republic | 1:21.33 | +1.92 |
| 21 | 19 | Nils Allègre | France | 1:21.34 | +1.93 |
| 22 | 40 | Albert Ortega | Spain | 1:21.48 | +2.07 |
| 23 | 15 | Christof Innerhofer | Italy | 1:21.63 | +2.22 |
| 24 | 23 | Boštjan Kline | Slovenia | 1:21.74 | +2.33 |
| 25 | 30 | Martin Čater | Slovenia | 1:21.90 | +2.49 |
| 26 | 41 | Joan Verdú | Andorra | 1:21.92 | +2.51 |
| 27 | 33 | Bryce Bennett | United States | 1:21.93 | +2.52 |
| 28 | 43 | Willis Feasey | New Zealand | 1:22.76 | +3.35 |
| 29 | 47 | Barnabás Szőllős | Israel | 1:22.83 | +3.42 |
| 30 | 34 | Marco Pfiffner | Liechtenstein | 1:23.02 | +3.61 |
| 31 | 46 | Martin Bendík | Slovakia | 1:24.85 | +5.44 |
| 32 | 55 | Juhan Luik | Estonia | 1:26.56 | +7.15 |
| 33 | 50 | Elvis Opmanis | Latvia | 1:27.45 | +8.04 |
| 34 | 49 | Benjamin Szőllős | Israel | 1:29.06 | +9.65 |
| | 1 | Christian Walder | Austria | Did not finish | |
| | 2 | Loïc Meillard | Switzerland | Did not finish | |
| | 3 | Mauro Caviezel | Switzerland | Did not finish | |
| | 12 | Mattia Casse | Italy | Did not finish | |
| | 14 | Max Franz | Austria | Did not finish | |
| | 16 | Johan Clarey | France | Did not finish | |
| | 25 | Miha Hrobat | Slovenia | Did not finish | |
| | 27 | Felix Monsén | Sweden | Did not finish | |
| | 29 | Dominik Schwaiger | Germany | Did not finish | |
| | 32 | Broderick Thompson | Canada | Did not finish | |
| | 35 | Olle Sundin | Sweden | Did not finish | |
| | 36 | Armand Marchant | Belgium | Did not finish | |
| | 37 | Nejc Naraločnik | Slovenia | Did not finish | |
| | 39 | Mattias Rönngren | Sweden | Did not finish | |
| | 45 | Adur Etxezarreta | Spain | Did not finish | |
| | 48 | Arnaud Alessandria | Monaco | Did not finish | |
| | 51 | Marcus Vorre | Denmark | Did not finish | |
| | 52 | Ivan Kovbasnyuk | Ukraine | Did not finish | |
| | 53 | Filip Baláž | Slovakia | Did not finish | |
| | 54 | Juan Pablo Vallecillo | Argentina | Did not finish | |
| | 56 | Lauris Opmanis | Latvia | Did not finish | |
| | 44 | Ondřej Berndt | Czech Republic | Did not start | |
