= Max Franz =

Austrian World Cup alpine ski racer

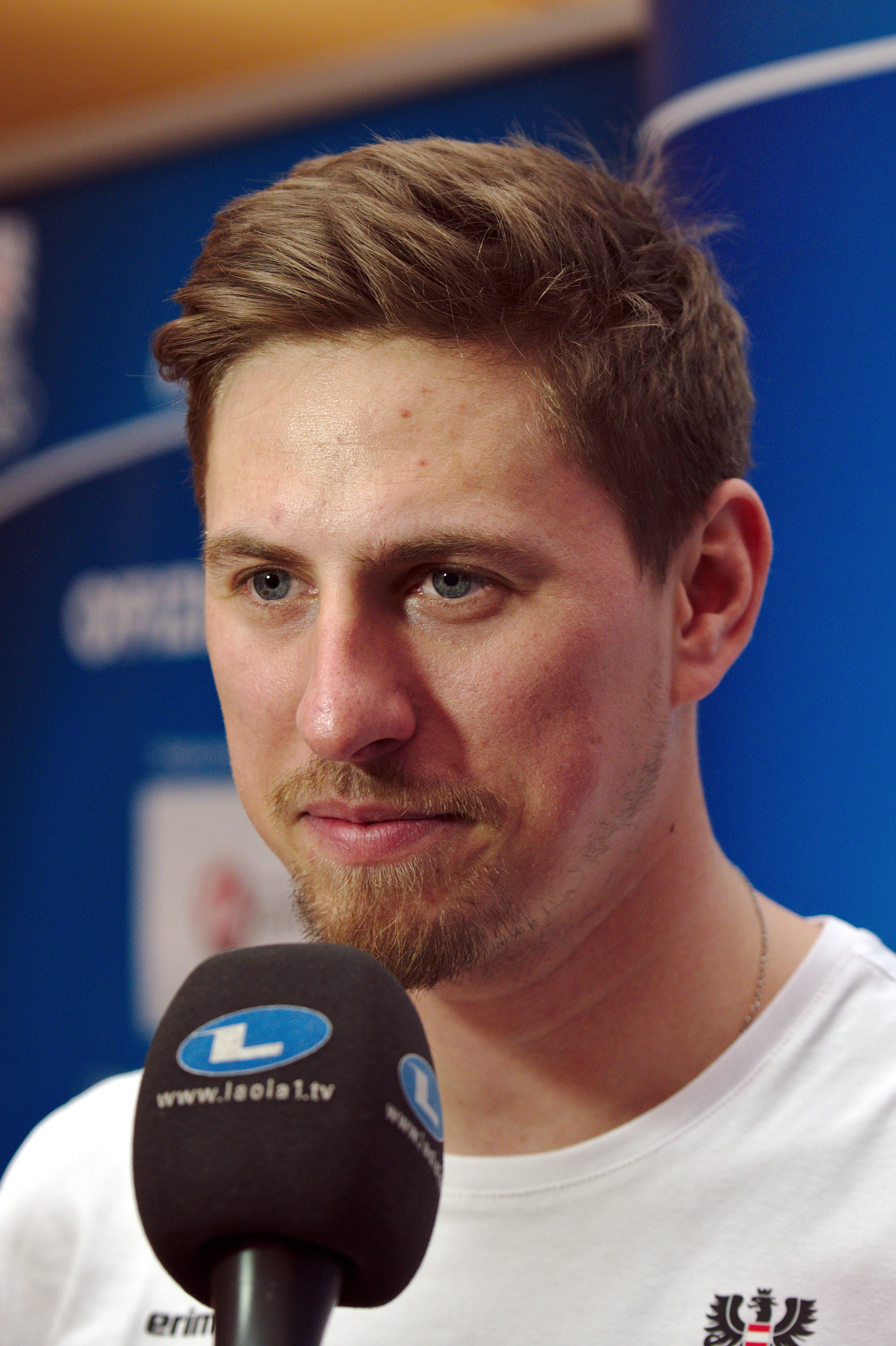
- February 2018

Personal information
- Born: 1 September 1989 (age 36) Klagenfurt, Carinthia, Austria
- Height: 1.82 m (6 ft 0 in)
- Website: maxfranz.at

Skiing career
- Sport: Alpine skiing
- Club: SV Weissbriach; Ski Sektion – Kaern
- Disciplines: Downhill, Super-G, Combined
- World Cup debut: 28 November 2009 (age 20)

Olympics
- Teams: 2 – (2014, 2018)
- Medals: 0

World Championships
- Teams: 4 – (2013–21)
- Medals: 1 (0 gold)

World Cup
- Seasons: 10 – (2012–2021)
- Wins: 3 – (2 DH, 1 SG)
- Podiums: 10 – (6 DH, 4 SG)
- Overall titles: 0 – (15th in 2015)
- Discipline titles: 0 – (5th in SG, 2018)
Medal record
Men's alpine skiing
Representing Austria
World Championships
Bronze medal – third place	2017 St. Moritz	Downhill

Max Franz (born 1 September 1989) is an Austrian World Cup alpine ski racer. Born in Klagenfurt, Carinthia, he focuses on the speed events of Downhill and Super-G.

== Career ==
Franz made his World Cup debut in November 2009 at Lake Louise, Canada. Three years later, Franz made his first World Cup podium in November 2012, in the Downhill at Lake Louise.

He is the cousin of alpine skier Werner Franz.

In 2017, Franz took his first World Cup win in Val Gardena in the downhill. He has two other wins in the World Cup, namely in Super G and another one in downhill. He also succeeded in the World Championships of 2017, where he achieved third place.

During a training event in Copper Mountain (USA), Franz fell and suffered fractures in both lower legs, making him unable to participate in the 2022/23 World Cup and the 2023 World Championships.

== World cup results ==
=== Race podiums ===
- 3 wins – (2 DH, 1 SG)
- 10 podiums – (6 DH, 4 SG)

Season
Season	Date	Location	Discipline	Place
2013	24 Nov 2012	Lake Louise, Canada	Downhill	2nd
2014	26 Jan 2014	Kitzbühel, Austria	Super-G	3rd
2015	21 Feb 2015	Saalbach, Austria	Downhill	2nd
2017	17 Dec 2016	Val Gardena, Italy	Downhill	1st
2018	26 Nov 2017	Lake Louise, Canada	Super-G	2nd
2018	15 Dec 2017	Val Gardena, Italy	Super-G	2nd
2018	16 Dec 2017	Val Gardena, Italy	Downhill	3rd
2019	24 Nov 2018	Lake Louise, Canada	Downhill	1st
2019	1 Dec 2018	(United States) Beaver Creek, USA	Super-G	1st
2019	15 Dec 2018	Val Gardena, Italy	Downhill	2nd

=== Season standings ===
Season
Season	Age	Overall	Slalom	Giant; Slalom	Super G	Downhill	Combined
2011	21	140	—	—	57	—	39
2012	22	32	—	—	14	24	23
2013	23	26	—	—	18	9	—
2014	24	26	—	—	15	13	37
2015	25	15	—	—	8	10	24
2016	26	43	—	—	22	27	28
2017	27	25	—	—	6	16	—
2018	28	17	—	—	5	10	—
2019 ^	29	21	—	56	11	9	—
2020	30	52	—	—	18	29	—
2021	31	43	—	—	19	13	—

Standings through 17 Jan 2021
^ Season-ending injury in January 2019

== World Championship results ==
Year
Year	Age	Slalom	Giant; Slalom	Super G	Downhill	Combined
2013	23	—	—	—	23	—
2015	25	—	—	—	19	—
2017	27	—	—	13	3	—
2021	31			DNF		

== Olympic results ==
Year
Year	Age	Slalom	Giant; Slalom	Super G	Downhill	Combined
2014	24	—	—	6	9	DNF2
2018	28	—	—	17	11	—
2022	32	—	—	DNF	9	—
