= Marianna Salchinger =

Austrian alpine skier

Personal information
- Born: 20 January 1974 (age 52) Ligist, Austria

Skiing career
- Sport: Alpine skiing
- Retired: 2001
- Disciplines: Speed events
- World Cup debut: 1993

World Cup
- Seasons: 8

Marianna Salchinger (born 20 January 1974) is a former Austrian alpine skier two-time winner of the FIS Alpine Ski Europa Cup (1997 and 1998).

== World Cup results ==
Top 10

Date	Place	Discipline	Rank
05-03-1999	(Switzerland) St. Moritz	Downhill	5
29-11-1998	(Canada) Lake Louise	Super G	6

== Europa Cup results ==
Salchinger has won two overall Europa Cup and three specialty standings.

- FIS Alpine Ski Europa Cup
  - Overall: 1997, 1998
  - Downhill: 1997, 1998
  - Super-G: 1997
