= 1976–77 FIS Alpine Ski Europa Cup =

Alpine skiing competition

| Discipline | Men | Women |
| Overall | (Bulgaria) Petar Popangelov | (Liechtenstein) Ursula Konzett |
| Downhill | (Austria) Günter Alster | (Switzerland) Evelyne Dirren (Austria) Martina Ellmer |
| Giant Slalom | (Italy) Arnold Senoner | (Liechtenstein) Ursula Konzett |
| Slalom | (Italy) Mauro Bernardi | (France) Martine Couttet |

Competition

1976–77 FIS Alpine Ski Europa Cup was the 6th season of the FIS Alpine Ski Europa Cup.

== Standings ==
=== Overall ===
Men

| Rank | Skier | Country | Points |
|---|---|---|---|
| 1 | Petar Popangelov | Bulgaria | 115 |
| 2 | Arnold Senoner | Italy | 93 |
| 3 | Jean-Luc Fournier | Switzerland | 91 |

Ladies

| Rank | Skier | Country | Points |
|---|---|---|---|
| 1 | Ursula Konzett | Liechtenstein | 131 |
| 2 | Sigrid Totschnig | Austria | 126 |
| 3 | Regina Sackl | Austria | 104 |

=== Downhill ===
Men

| Rank | Skier | Country | Points |
|---|---|---|---|
| 1 | Gunter Alster | Austria | 73 |
| 2 | Bartl Gensbichler | Austria | 45 |
| 3 | Roland Lutz | Switzerland | 44 |

Ladies

| Rank | Skier | Country | Points |
|---|---|---|---|
| 1 | Evelyne Dirren | Switzerland | 50 |
| 1 | Martina Ellmer | Austria | 50 |
| 3 | Doris de Agostini | Switzerland | 40 |

=== Giant Slalom ===
Men

| Rank | Skier | Country | Points |
|---|---|---|---|
| 1 | Arnold Senoner | Italy | 74 |
| 2 | Petar Popangelov | Bulgaria | 65 |
| 3 | Jean-Luc Fournier | Switzerland | 47 |
| 3 | Didier Bonvin | Switzerland | 47 |

Ladies

| Rank | Skier | Country | Points |
|---|---|---|---|
| 1 | Ursula Konzett | Liechtenstein | 95 |
| 2 | Jill Wahlqvist | Sweden | 76 |
| 3 | Christa Kinshofer | West Germany | 69 |

=== Slalom ===
Men

| Rank | Skier | Country | Points |
|---|---|---|---|
| 1 | Mauro Bernardi | Italy | 72 |
| 2 | Petar Popangelov | Bulgaria | 50 |
| 3 | Peter Aelling | Switzerland | 47 |

Ladies

| Rank | Skier | Country | Points |
|---|---|---|---|
| 1 | Martine Coutet | France | 87 |
| 2 | Michaela Schaffner | Austria | 70 |
| 3 | Sigrid Totschnig | Austria | 57 |
