= Stefan Luitz =

German alpine skier (born 1992)

Personal information
- Born: 26 March 1992 (age 34) Bolsterlang, Germany
- Height: 1.85 m (6 ft 1 in)

Skiing career
- Sport: Alpine skiing
- Club: SC Bolsterlang
- Disciplines: Giant slalom, slalom
- World Cup debut: 8 January 2011 (age 18)

Olympics
- Teams: 1 – (2014)
- Medals: 0

World Championships
- Teams: 6 – (2011–21)
- Medals: 2 (team) (0 gold)

World Cup
- Seasons: 11 – (2011–2021)
- Wins: 1 – (1 GS)
- Podiums: 8 – (7 GS, 1 PG)
- Overall titles: 0 – (23rd in 2017)
- Discipline titles: 0 – (3rd in PAR, 2020)
Medal record
Men's alpine skiing
Representing Germany
World Championships
Bronze medal – third place	2013 Schladming	Team event
Bronze medal – third place	2021 Cortina d’Ampezzo	Team event
Junior World Championships
Silver medal – second place	2010 Les Houches	Giant slalom

Stefan Luitz (German pronunciation: [ˈʃtɛfan ˈluːɪts]; born 26 March 1992) is a German World Cup alpine ski racer. He primarily competes in giant slalom, but in January 2016 at Kitzbühel, Luitz completed both runs in slalom, a first in his World Cup career, and finished eighteenth. His only previous second run in slalom was more than three years earlier, in December 2012 at Madonna di Campiglio, where he failed to finish.

Luitz made his World Cup debut at Adelboden in 2011, and attained his first podium in December 2012, a second place in giant slalom at Val d'Isère, France.

== World Cup results ==
=== Season standings ===
Season	Age	Overall	Slalom	Giant Slalom	Super-G	Downhill	Combined	Parallel
2012	19	147	—	50	—	—	—	awarded with SL, GS
2013	20	65	—	20	—	—	—	awarded with SL, GS
2014	21	47	—	13	—	—	—	awarded with SL, GS
2015	22	68	—	20	—	—	—	awarded with SL, GS
2016	23	39	45	9	—	—	—	awarded with SL, GS
2017	24	23	33	7	—	—	—	awarded with SL, GS
2018	25	50	—	13	—	—	—	awarded with SL, GS
2019	26	42	—	11	—	—	—	awarded with SL, GS
2020	27	50	—	22	—	—	—	3
2021	28	51	—	19	—	—	—	7

=== Race podiums ===
- 1 win – (1 GS)
- 8 podiums – (7 GS, 1 PG)

Season	Date	Location	Discipline	Place
2013	9 December 2012	Val d'Isère, France	Giant slalom	2nd
2014	14 December 2013	Val d'Isère, France	Giant slalom	3rd
2015	12 December 2014	Åre, Sweden	Giant slalom	3rd
2017	29 January 2017	Garmisch-Partenkirchen, Germany	Giant slalom	3rd
2018	3 December 2017	(United States) Beaver Creek, USA	Giant slalom	3rd
2018	9 December 2017	Val d'Isère, France	Giant slalom	2nd
2019	2 December 2018	(United States) Beaver Creek, USA	Giant slalom	1st
2020	24 December 2019	Alta Badia, Italy	Parallel-G	2nd

== World Championship results ==
Year	Age	Slalom	Giant slalom	Super-G	Downhill	Combined	Team	Parallel
2011	18	DNF1	29	—	—	—	—N/a	—N/a
2013	20	21	DSQ1	—	—	—	—N/a	—N/a
2015	22	—	20	—	—	—	—N/a	—N/a
2017	24	28	14	—	—	—	3	—N/a
2019	26	—	DNF1	—	—	—	—	—N/a
2021	28	—	7	—	—	—	3	9

== Olympic results ==
Year	Age	Slalom	Giant slalom	Super-G	Downhill	Combined
2014	21	DNF2	DSQ1	—	—	—
