= World Junior Alpine Skiing Championships 2011 =

International skiing competition

The World Junior Alpine Skiing Championships 2011 were the 30th World Junior Alpine Skiing Championships, held between 30 January and 5 February 2011 in Crans-Montana, Switzerland.

== Medal winners ==
=== Men's events ===
Event	Gold		Silver		Bronze	
Downhill	Boštjan Kline; Slovenia	1:37.34	Frederic Berthold; Austria	1:37.38	Otmar Striedinger; Austria	1:37.78
Super-G	Boštjan Kline; Slovenia	1:22.43	Frederic Berthold; Austria	1:22.67	Justin Murisier; Switzerland	1:23.19
Giant Slalom	Alexis Pinturault; France	2:19.62	Vincent Kriechmayr; Austria	2:20.25	Mathieu Faivre; France	2:20.71
Slalom	Reto Schmidiger; Switzerland	1:28.54	Justin Murisier; Switzerland	1:30.08	Mathias Rolland; France	1:30.57
Combined	Reto Schmidiger; Switzerland		Justin Murisier; Switzerland		Phil Brown; Canada	

=== Women's events ===
Event	Gold		Silver		Bronze	
Downhill	Lotte Smiseth Sejersted; Norway	1:32.11	Wendy Holdener; Switzerland	1:32.45	Cornelia Hütter; Austria	1:32.80
Super-G	Elena Curtoni; Italy	1:28.23	Jasmin Rothmund; Switzerland	1:28.53	Cornelia Hütter; Austria	1:28.90
Giant Slalom	Sara Hector; Sweden	2:28.27	Lisa Magdalena Agerer; Italy	2:28.43	Wendy Holdener; Switzerland	2:29.44
Slalom	Jessica Depauli; Austria	1:40.32	Anna Swenn-Larsson; Sweden	1:41.22	Mikaela Shiffrin; United States	1:41.27
Combined	Wendy Holdener; Switzerland		Andrea Thürler; Switzerland		Joana Hählen; Switzerland	
