= Christian Walder =

Austrian alpine skier

Personal information
- Born: 31 August 1991 (age 34)
- Website: walderchristian.at

Skiing career
- Sport: Alpine skiing
- Club: SC Fresach – Kaernten
- Disciplines: Super-G, Downhill
- World Cup debut: December 2015 (age 24)

Olympics
- Teams: 0

World Championships
- Teams: 1 – (2021)
- Medals: 0

World Cup
- Seasons: 6 − (2016–2021)
- Wins: 0
- Podiums: 1 − (1 SG)
- Overall titles: 0 – (56th in 2018)
- Discipline titles: 0 – (14th in SG, 2020)
Medal record
Men's alpine skiing
Representing Austria

Christian Walder (born 31 August 1991) is an Austrian World Cup alpine ski racer, and specializes in the speed events of super-G and downhill.

== Biography ==
Walder made his World Cup debut at age 24 on 18 December 2015, in a super-G at Val Gardena, Italy. He reached his first World Cup podium in December 2020 in a super-G at Val-d'Isère, France, and competed in his first World Championships in February 2021.

== World Cup results ==
=== Season standings ===
| Season | Age | Overall | Slalom | Giant slalom | Super-G | Downhill | Combined |
|---|---|---|---|---|---|---|---|
| 2016 | 24 | 157 | — | — | 58 | — | — |
| 2017 | 25 | 76 | — | — | 29 | 32 | 37 |
| 2018 | 26 | 56 | — | — | 18 | 33 | — |
| 2019 | 27 | 57 | — | — | 18 | 29 | — |
| 2020 | 28 | 68 | — | — | 14 | 38 | — |
| 2021 | 29 | 52 | — | — | 9 | 49 | — |

Standings through 27 February 2021

=== Race podiums ===
- 1 podium - (1 SG); 6 top tens

| Season | Date | Location | Discipline | Place |
|---|---|---|---|---|
| 2021 | 12 Dec 2020 | Val-d'Isère, France | Super-G | 3rd |

== World Championship results ==
| Year | Age | Slalom | Giant slalom | Super-G | Downhill | Combined | Parallel | Team event |
|---|---|---|---|---|---|---|---|---|
| 2021 | 29 | — | — | DNF | — | — | — | — |
