= Lisa Agerer =

Italian alpine skier

Lisa Magdalena Agerer
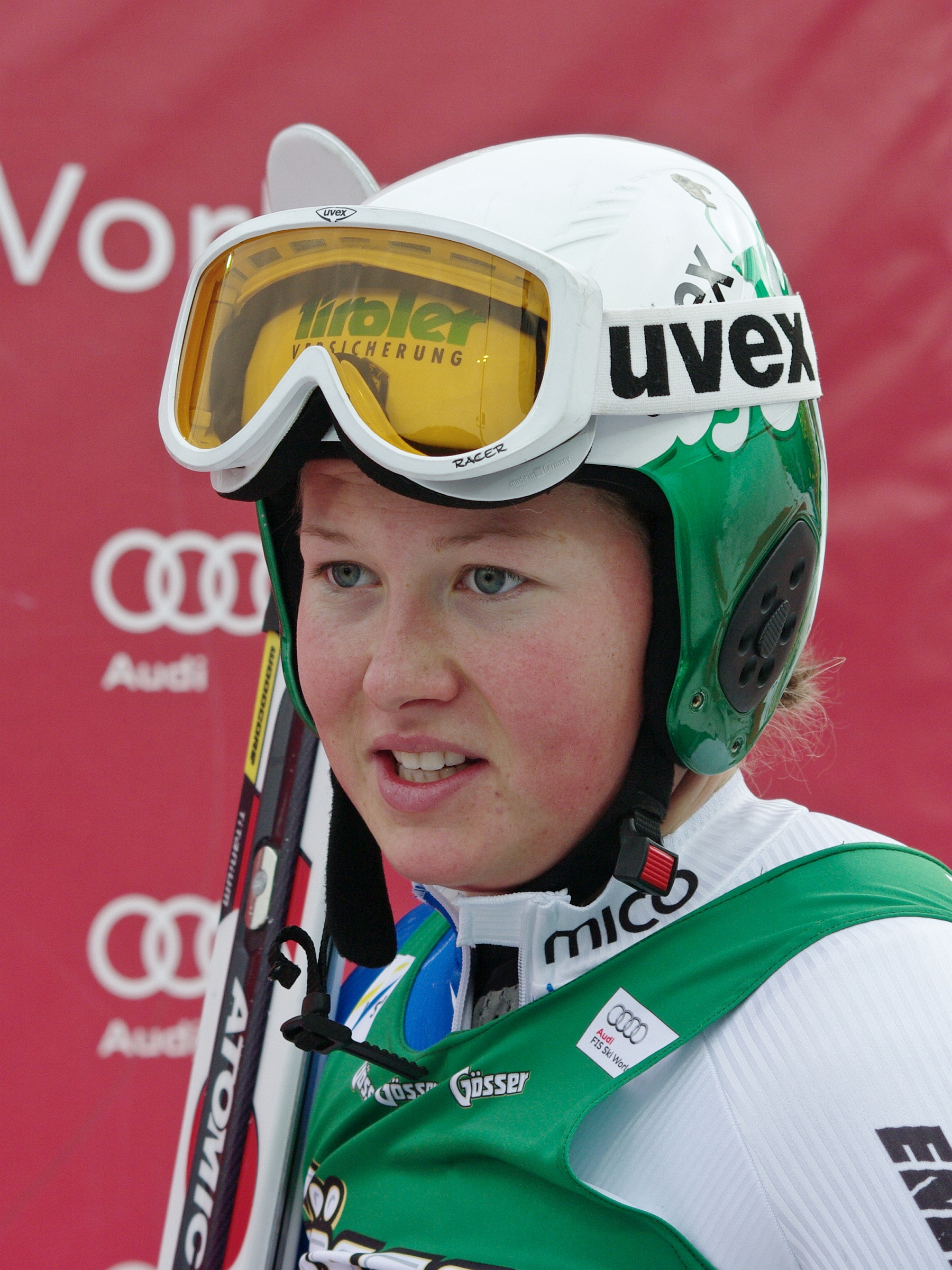

Personal information
- Born: 1 November 1991 (age 34) Zams, Austria
- Height: 1.72 m (5 ft 8 in)

Skiing career
- Sport: Alpine skiing
- Club: G.S. Forestale; C.S. Carabinieri
- Disciplines: Downhill; Super-G; Giant Slalom
Medal record
Women's alpine skiing
Representing Italy
Junior World Championships
Silver medal – second place	2011 Crans-Montana	Giant Slalom

Lisae Agerer (born 1 November 1991) is an Italian female alpine skier, who won the Alpine Skiing Europa Cup in 2012.

== Biography ==
She won the silver medal in the giant slalom at the World Junior Alpine Skiing Championships 2011. In the Alpine Ski World Cup her best result was the 7th place in the giant slalom of Åre in 2012.

== Europa Cup results ==
Agerer has won an overall Europa Cup and 3 specialty standings.

- FIS Alpine Ski Europa Cup
  - Overall: 2012
  - Downhill: 2012
  - Giant Slalom: 2011, 2012
