= Rahel Kopp =

Swiss alpine skier

Personal information
- Born: 18 March 1994 (age 32)
- Height: 1.67 m (5 ft 6 in)
- Website: rahelkopp.ch

Skiing career
- Sport: Alpine skiing
- Club: Flumserberg
- Disciplines: Slalom, giant slalom, combined
World Cup debut
26 October 2013 (age 19)

Olympics
- Teams: 0

World Championships
- Teams: 0

World Cup
- Seasons: 8 – (2014–2021)
- Podiums: 0
- Overall titles: 0 – (70th in 2016)
- Discipline titles: 0 – (4th in AC, 2019)
Medal record
Women's alpine skiing
Representing Switzerland
Junior World Championships
Gold medal – first place	2015 Hafjell	Combined
Silver medal – second place	2013 Quebec	Team event
Bronze medal – third place	2015 Hafjell	Super-G

Rahel Kopp (born 18 March 1994) is a Swiss World Cup alpine ski racer, and specializes in the technical events of slalom and giant slalom. She made her World Cup debut at age 19 in October 2013, and her best finish is a fourth place in a combined event in February 2019.

== World Cup results ==
=== Season standings ===
Season	Age	Overall	Slalom	Giant slalom	Super-G	Downhill	Combined
2015	20	114	51	—	—	—	—
2016	21	70	43	54	—	—	12
2017	22	83	52	48	—	—	22
2018	23	75	—	—	38	—	14
2019	24	74	—	—	—	—	4

Standings through 27 February 2019

=== Top ten finishes ===
- 0 podiums; 3 top tens

Season	Date	Location	Discipline	Place
2016	28 February 2016	Soldeu, Andorra	Combined	5th
2018	4 March 2018	Crans-Montana, Switzerland	Combined	7th
2019	24 February 2019	Crans-Montana, Switzerland	Combined	4th
