= Sergei Maitakov =

Russian alpine skier (born 1990)

Medal record

Men's alpine skiing

Representing Russia

World Junior Championships
Bronze medal – third place	2010 Les Planards	Slalom

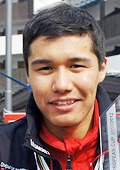
Sergey Maytakov

Sergei Vladimirovich Maitakov (Russian: Серге́й Владимирович Майтаков) (born 7 January 1990 in Mezhdurechensk, Kemerovo Oblast) is a Russian olympic alpine skier.
