= Frederic Berthold =

Austrian World Cup alpine ski racer (born 1991)

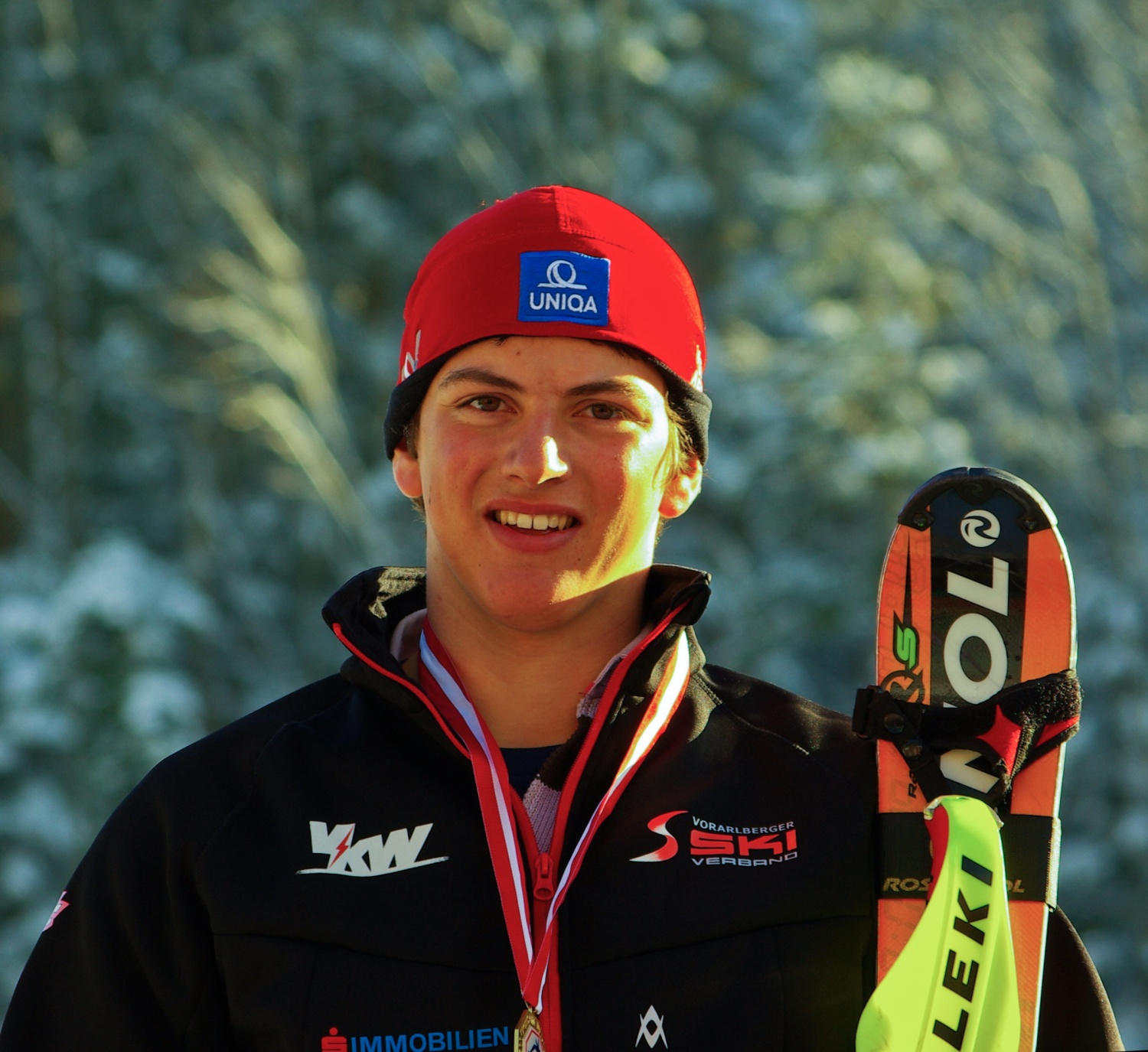
- Berthold in 2008

Personal information
- Born: 3 June 1991 (age 35) Austria
- Height: 1.84 m (6 ft 0 in)

Skiing career
- Sport: Alpine skiing
- Club: SC Gargellen - Vorarlberg
- Disciplines: Downhill, Super-G, Combined
World Cup debut
26 February 2011 (age 19)

Olympics
- Teams: 0

World Championships
- Teams: 0

World Cup
- Seasons: 4 – (2013, 2016–2018)
- Wins: 0
- Podiums: 1 – (1 AC)
- Overall titles: 0 – (84th in 2017)
- Discipline titles: 0 – (8th in AC in 2017)
Medal record
Men's alpine skiing
Representing Austria
Junior World Championships
Silver medal – second place	2010 Mont Blanc	Downhill
Silver medal – second place	2011 Crans-Montana	Downhill
Silver medal – second place	2011 Crans-Montana	Super-G

Frederic Berthold (born 3 June 1991) is an Austrian World Cup alpine ski racer. Berthold specializes in the speed events of Downhill and Super-G, and also competes in the combined event.

== Career ==
Berthold made his World Cup debut at age 19 in February 2011 in Bulgaria at Bansko where he finished thirtieth in the combined. He made his first podium in January 2017 in the combined at Wengen.

== World Cup results ==
=== Season standings ===
Season	Age	Overall	Slalom	Giant slalom	Super-G	Downhill	Combined
2011	19	167	—	—	—	—	56
2012	20	143	—	—	58	—	—
2013	21	107	—	—	—	41	—
2014	22	129	—	—	—	51	35
2015	23	no points					
2016	24	no points					
2017	25	84	—	—	—	43	8
2018	26	129	—	—	—	—	25

=== Race podiums ===
- 1 podium – (1 SC); 1 top ten

Season	Date	Location	Discipline	Place
2017	13 Jan 2017	Wengen, Switzerland	Combined	3rd
