= Jessica Depauli =

Austrian alpine skier (born 1991)

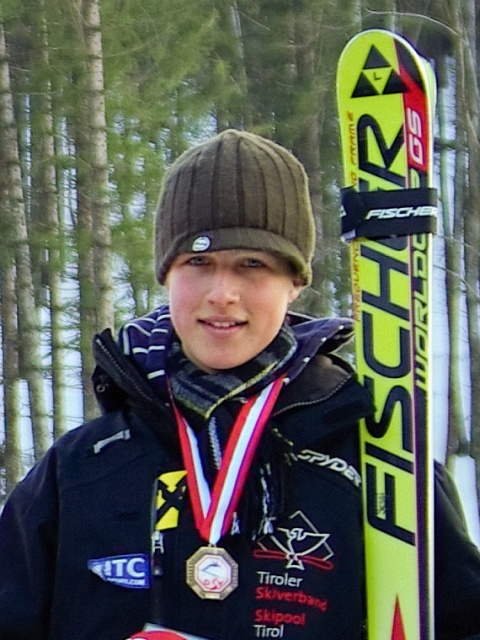

Jessica Depauli (born 1991) is a retired Austrian alpine skier.

She competed at the 2010 and 2011 Junior World Championships. In 2010 she won the silver medal in the downhill and bronze in the combined, and in 2011 she won the gold medal in the slalom.

She made her World Cup debut in November 2010 in Levi. She collected her first World Cup points with a 23rd place in March 2011 in Lenzerheide. She managed seven more World Cup placements in the 20s range before improving to 18th in her very last World Cup outing, in March 2013 in Ofterschwang.

She represented the sports club SK Kirchberg.
