= Simon Maurberger =

Italian alpine skier

Personal information
- Born: 20 February 1995 (age 31) Ahrntal, Italy
- Website: SimonMaurberger.com

Skiing career
- Sport: Alpine skiing
- Club: CS Carabinieri
- Disciplines: Slalom, giant slalom
- World Cup debut: 26 October 2014 (age 19)

World Championships
- Teams: 1 − (2019)
- Medals: 1 (0 gold)

World Cup
- Seasons: 3 − (2016, 2017, 2019)
- Podiums: 0
- Overall titles: 0 – (122nd in 2017)
- Discipline titles: 0 – (44th in GS, 2017)
Medal record
World Championships
Bronze medal – third place	2019 Åre	Team event

Simon Maurberger (born 20 February 1995) is an Italian World Cup alpine ski racer.

He competed at the FIS Alpine World Ski Championships 2019, winning a medal.
