= Emanuele Buzzi =

Italian alpine skier

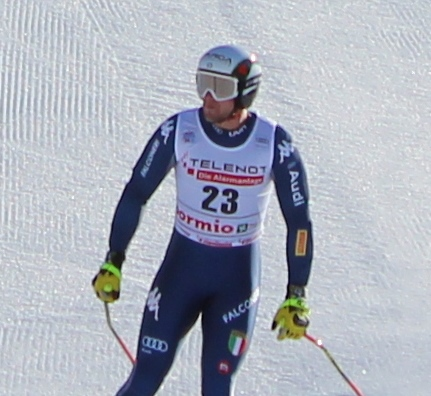
- Buzzi in 2019.

Personal information
- Born: 27 October 1994 (age 31) Innichen (San Candido), South Tyrol, Italy
- Height: 1.88 m (6 ft 2 in)

Skiing career
- Sport: Alpine skiing
- Club: CS Carabinieri
- Disciplines: Downhill, Super-G, Combined
World Cup debut
| 19 December 2014 (age 20) |

Olympics
- Teams: 1 – (2018)
- Medals: 0

World Championships
- Teams: 2 – (2017-2021)
- Medals: 0

World Cup
- Seasons: 6 – (2016–2021)
- Podiums: 0
- Overall titles: 0 – (62nd in 2020)
- Discipline titles: 0 – (19th in SG, 2020)

Emanuele Buzzi (born 27 October 1994) is an Italian World Cup alpine ski racer and specializes in the speed events of Downhill and Super G, and made his World Cup debut in December 2014. He competed at the World Championships in 2017 and 2021 and the 2018 Winter Olympics.

== Career ==
On 19 December 2014, Buzzi made his World Cup debut at the Val Gardena downhill, and finished fiftieth. In 2016, he scored his first World Cup points on 6 February in South Korea at the Jeongseon downhill, in 25th place.

== World Cup results ==
=== Season standings ===
| Season | Age | Overall | Slalom | Giant slalom | Super-G | Downhill | Combined |
|---|---|---|---|---|---|---|---|
| 2015 | 20 | no points | | | | | |
| 2016 | 21 | 136 | — | — | 54 | 54 | — |
| 2017 | 22 | 129 | — | — | 51 | 47 | — |
| 2018 | 23 | 69 | — | — | 38 | 25 | 29 |
| 2019 | 24 | 64 | — | — | 37 | 21 | — |
| 2020 | 25 | 62 | — | — | 19 | 33 | — |
| 2021 | 26 | 95 | — | — | 26 | — | — |

Standings through 28 January 2021

=== Top ten finishes ===
- 0 podiums; 4 top tens (3 DH, 1 SG)

== World Championship results ==
| Year | Age | Slalom | Giant slalom | Super-G | Downhill | Combined |
|---|---|---|---|---|---|---|
| 2017 | 22 | — | — | 23 | — | — |
| 2021 | 26 | | | 13 | | |

== Olympic results ==
| Year | Age | Slalom | Giant slalom | Super-G | Downhill | Combined |
|---|---|---|---|---|---|---|
| 2018 | 23 | — | — | — | 22 | — |
