= Espen Lysdahl =

Norwegian alpine skier

Personal information
- Born: 19 April 1990 (age 36)

Skiing career
- Sport: Alpine skiing ♂
- Club: Asker Skiklubb
- Disciplines: Slalom, giant slalom
World Cup debut
18 December 2009 (age 18)

World Cup
- Seasons: 4th – (2010–11, 2015–16)
- Wins: 0
- Podiums: 0
- Overall titles: 0 – (110th in 2015)
- Discipline titles: 0 – (35th in SL, 2015)

Espen Lysdahl (born 19 April 1990) is a Norwegian alpine ski racer. He represents Asker Skiklubb. He competed at the 2015 World Championships in Beaver Creek, USA, in the slalom, where he placed 16th.

== World Cup results ==
Season	Age	Overall	Slalom	Giant slalom
2015	24	110	35	—
2016	25	133	45	—

== World Championship results ==
Year	Age	Slalom	Giant slalom
2015	24	16	—
