= Nejc Naraločnik =

Slovenian alpine skier (born 1999)

Personal information
- Born: January 5, 1999 (age 27) Slovenj Gradec, Slovenia

Sport
- Country: Slovenia
- Sport: Alpine skiing

Nejc Naraločnik (born January 5, 1999) is an alpine skier who competes for Slovenia. He competed for Slovenia at the 2022 Winter Olympics in the downhill, Super-G, and combined.
