= Lisa Hörnblad =

Swedish alpine skier (born 1996)

Personal information
- Nationality: (Sweden)
- Born: 6 March 1996 (age 30)

Skiing career
- Sport: Alpine skiing

World Cup
- Seasons: 4 - (2018–2019, 2022, 2024)
- Wins: 0

Lisa Hörnblad (born 6 March 1996) is a Swedish alpine skier, specialising in the speed events of Downhill and Super-G.

She represented Sweden at the 2017 World Championships in St Moritz. and at the 2018 Olympics in Pyeongchang as well.

== Olympic results ==
Year	Age	Slalom	Giant slalom	Super-G	Downhill	Combined
2018	21	—	—	24	17	—
