= Jessica Hilzinger =

German alpine skier (born 1997)

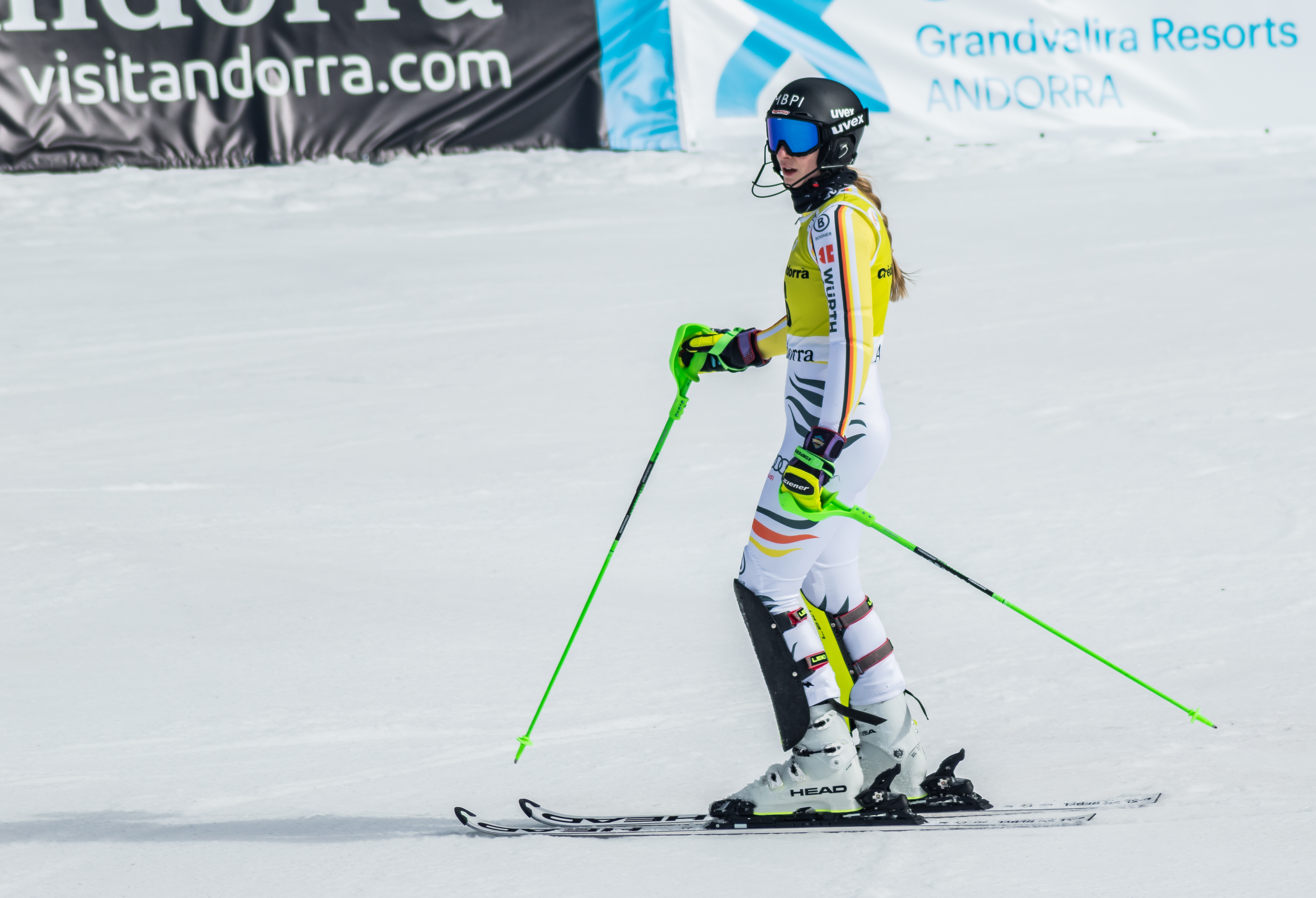
- Hilzinger in 2023

Personal information
- Born: 26 May 1997 (age 29) Grabs, Switzerland
- Height: 1.75 m (5 ft 9 in)

Skiing career
- Sport: Alpine skiing
- Club: SC 1906 Oberstdorf
- Disciplines: Slalom
- World Cup debut: 28 November 2015 (age 18)

World Championships
- Teams: 2 – (2023, 2025)
- Medals: 0

World Cup
- Seasons: 9 – (2013, 2018–2025)
- Podiums: 0
- Overall titles: 0 – (54th in 2023)
- Discipline titles: 0 – (20th in 2023)

Jessica Hilzinger (born 26 May 1997 in Grabs, Switzerland) is a German alpine ski racer.

== World Championship results ==
Year
Year	Age	Slalom	Giant; Slalom	Super-G	Downhill	Combined	Parallel	Team Event
2023	25	DNF2	DNF1	—	—	—	DNF	6
2025	27	DNF1	—	—	—	—	—N/a	5
