= Nadine Fest =

Austrian alpine skier

Personal information
- Born: 28 June 1998 (age 28) Villach, Austria

Skiing career
- Country: Austria
- Sport: Alpine skiing
- Club: SC Gerlitzen - Kaernten
- Disciplines: Downhill, super-G
- World Cup debut: 28 October 2017 (age 19)

World Cup
- Seasons: 9 – (2018–2026)
- Podiums: 0
- Overall titles: 0 – (47th in 2022)
- Discipline titles: 0 – (22nd in AC, 2018)
Medal record
Women's alpine skiing
Representing Austria
Winter Youth Olympic Games
| Gold medal – first place | 2016 Lillehammer | Super-G |
Junior World Championships
| Gold medal – first place | 2017 Åre | Super-G |
| Gold medal – first place | 2017 Åre | Combined |

Nadine Fest (born 28 June 1998) is an Austrian alpine skier.

== Career ==
She at young level won the gold medal in super-G at the 2016 Winter Youth Olympic Games and two gold medals in super-G and combined at the World Junior Alpine Skiing Championships 2017.

At open level she won a FIS Alpine Ski Europa Cup in 2020.

== World Cup results ==
=== Season standings ===
Season
| Season | Age | Overall | Slalom | Giant slalom | Super-G | Downhill | Combined |
| 2018 | 19 | 94 | — | — | 47 | — | 22 |
| 2019 | 20 | 96 | — | — | — | 38 | — |
| 2020 | 21 | 98 | — | — | 45 | — | 28 |
| 2021 | 22 | 84 | — | — | 38 | 38 | —N/a |
| 2022 | 23 | 47 | — | — | 23 | 29 | —N/a |
| 2023 | 24 | 82 | — | — | 33 | 43 | —N/a |
| 2024 | 25 | 101 | — | — | 44 | 50 | —N/a |
| 2025 | 26 | 70 | — | — | 31 | 35 | —N/a |
| 2026 | 27 | 64 | — | — | 27 | 29 | —N/a |

=== Top-ten finishes ===
- 0 podiums, 1 top ten

Season
| Season | Date | Location | Discipline | Place |
| 2022 | 30 January 2022 | Garmisch-Partenkirchen, Germany | Super-G | 5th |

== Europa Cup results ==
Fest has won three overall Europa Cups and eight specialty standings.

- FIS Alpine Ski Europa Cup
  - Overall: 2020, 2023, 2025
  - Downhill: 2020, 2023, 2025
  - Super-G: 2017, 2020, 2025
  - Combined: 2017, 2020
