= Reto Schmidiger =

Swiss alpine skier (born 1992)

Reto Schmidiger (born 21 April 1992 in Hergiswil) is a Swiss alpine skier.
