= 2016–17 FIS Alpine Ski World Cup =

International sports competition

2016–17 FIS Alpine Ski World Cup champions
| Discipline | Men | Women |
| Overall | (Austria) Marcel Hirscher | (United States) Mikaela Shiffrin |
| Downhill | (Italy) Peter Fill | (Slovenia) Ilka Štuhec |
| Super-G | (Norway) Kjetil Jansrud | (Liechtenstein) Tina Weirather |
| Giant slalom | (Austria) Marcel Hirscher | (France) Tessa Worley |
| Slalom | (Austria) Marcel Hirscher | (United States) Mikaela Shiffrin |
| Alpine combined | (France) Alexis Pinturault | (Slovenia) Ilka Štuhec |
| Nations Cup | Austria | Italy |
- Nations Cup Overall: Austria

Competition
| Locations | 17 venues | 19 venues |
| Individual | 36 events | 37 events |
| Mixed | 1 event | 1 event |
| Cancelled | 6 events | 1 event |
| Rescheduled | 5 events | 1 event |

The International Ski Federation (FIS) Alpine Skiing World Cup is the premier circuit for alpine skiing competition. The inaugural FIS World Cup season launched 59 years ago in January 1967 and this 51st season began on 22 October 2016 in Sölden, Austria, and concluded in the United States at Aspen on 19 March 2017. The biennial World Championships interrupted the tour in early February in Saint Moritz, Switzerland. The season-ending finals in March were held in North America for the first time in two decades: the last finale in the U.S. was in 1997 at Vail.

Chief Race Director for the WC Tour, Markus Waldner, offered his pre-season thoughts on the pending 2016-17 tour in an early October interview. He addressed: early season scheduling and weather considerations, the growing global interest in alpine skiing beyond the core market in Europe and Scandinavia, the balance between what disciplines were scheduled and the marketability concerns each present, course construction that is safely competitive and manages risk, and a new change to regulation that allows top qualifiers to pick their starting position across a much wider range of bibs between 1 and 19.

Former overall World Cup champion Tina Maze of Slovenia, who missed the entire 2015-16 World Cup season, retired in January 2017. At the end of the season, former two-time overall World Cup champion Bode Miller of the United States, who had not raced in the last two seasons, also officially retired.

Men's overall champion

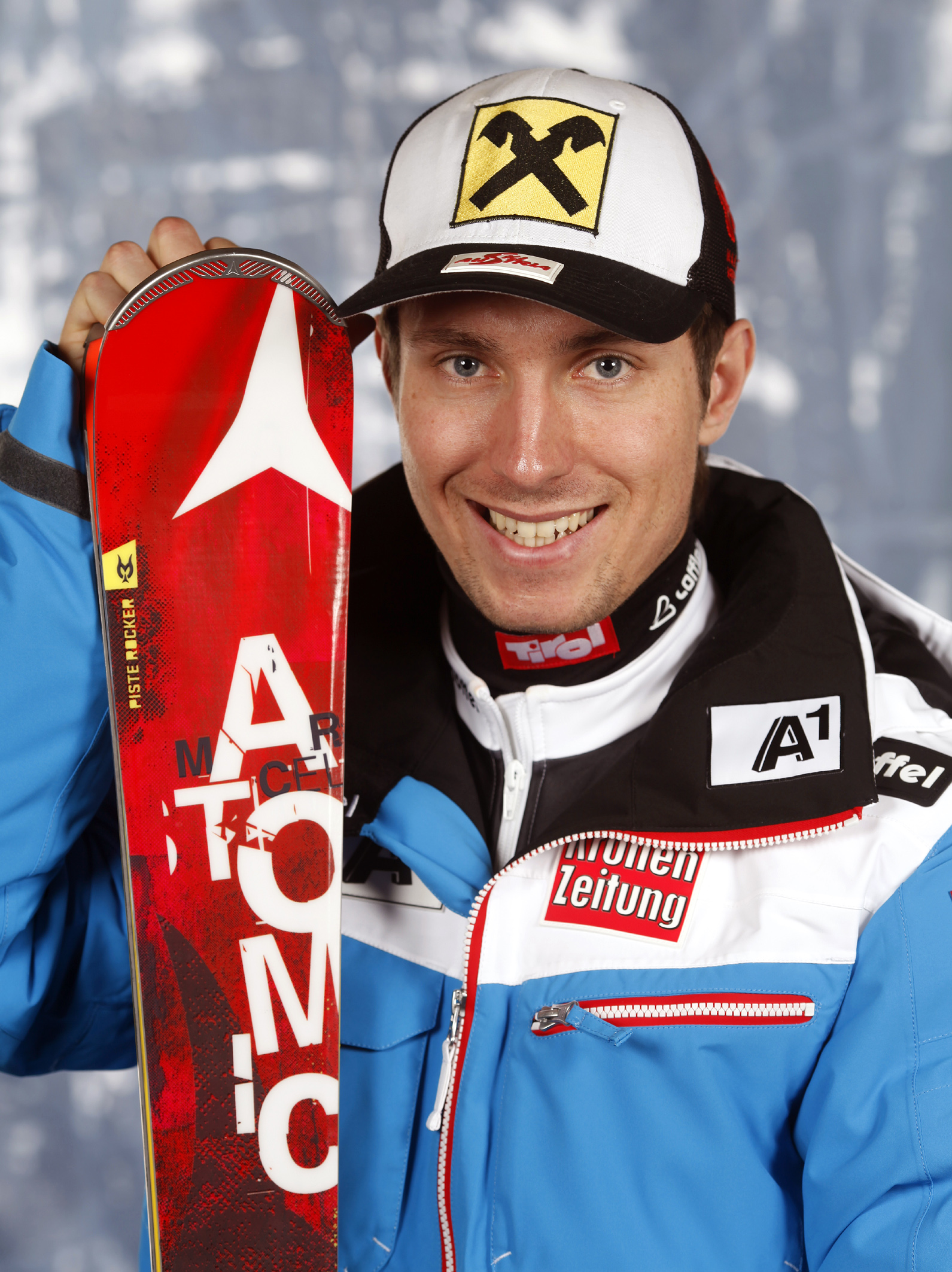
Marcel Hirscher won the overall title for the sixth successive year.

Summary

== Men ==
=== Calendar ===
Event key: DH – Downhill, SL – Slalom, GS – Giant slalom, SG – Super giant slalom, AC – Alpine combined, CE – City Event (Parallel), PG – Parallel giant slalom
| Race | Season | Date | Place | Type | Winner | Second | Third | Details |
|---|---|---|---|---|---|---|---|---|
| 1637 | 1 | 23 October 2016 | (Austria) Sölden | GS _{390} | (France) Alexis Pinturault | (Austria) Marcel Hirscher | (Germany) Felix Neureuther | |
| 1638 | 2 | 13 November 2016 | (Finland) Levi | SL _{460} | (Austria) Marcel Hirscher | (Austria) Michael Matt | (Italy) Manfred Mölgg | |
| | | 26 November 2016 | (Canada) Lake Louise | DH _{cnx} | warm temperatures and lack of snow on lower course; replaced in Kvitfjell on 24 February 2017 | | | |
| | | 27 November 2016 | (Canada) Lake Louise | SG _{cnx} | warm temperatures and lack of snow on lower course; replaced in Santa Caterina on 27 December 2016 | | | |
| | | 2 December 2016 | (United States) Beaver Creek | DH _{cnx} | warm temperatures and lack of snow; replaced in Val d'Isère on 3 December 2016 | | | |
| | | 3 December 2016 | (United States) Beaver Creek | SG _{cnx} | warm temperatures and lack of snow; replaced in Val d'Isère on 2 December 2016 | | | |
| | | 4 December 2016 | (United States) Beaver Creek | GS _{cnx} | warm temperatures and lack of snow; replaced in Val d'Isère on 4 December 2016 | | | |
| 1639 | 3 | 2 December 2016 | (France) Val d'Isère | SG _{193} | (Norway) Kjetil Jansrud | (Norway) Aksel Lund Svindal | (Italy) Dominik Paris | |
| 1640 | 4 | 3 December 2016 | (France) Val d'Isère | DH _{463} | (Norway) Kjetil Jansrud | (Italy) Peter Fill | (Norway) Aksel Lund Svindal | |
| 1641 | 5 | 4 December 2016 | (France) Val d'Isère | GS_{391} | (France) Mathieu Faivre | (Austria) Marcel Hirscher | (France) Alexis Pinturault | |
| 1642 | 6 | 10 December 2016 | (France) Val d'Isère | GS_{392} | (France) Alexis Pinturault | (Austria) Marcel Hirscher | (Norway) Henrik Kristoffersen | |
| 1643 | 7 | 11 December 2016 | (France) Val d'Isère | SL_{461} | (Norway) Henrik Kristoffersen | (Austria) Marcel Hirscher | (Russia) Aleksandr Khoroshilov | |
| 1644 | 8 | 16 December 2016 | (Italy) Val Gardena | SG_{194} | (Norway) Kjetil Jansrud | (Norway) Aleksander Aamodt Kilde | (Canada) Erik Guay | |
| 1645 | 9 | 17 December 2016 | (Italy) Val Gardena | DH_{464} | (Austria) Max Franz | (Norway) Aksel Lund Svindal | (United States) Steven Nyman | |
| 1646 | 10 | 18 December 2016 | (Italy) Alta Badia | GS_{393} | (Austria) Marcel Hirscher | (France) Mathieu Faivre | (Italy) Florian Eisath | |
| 1647 | 11 | 19 December 2016 | (Italy) Alta Badia | PG _{002} | (France) Cyprien Sarrazin | (Switzerland) Carlo Janka | (Norway) Kjetil Jansrud | |
| 1648 | 12 | 22 December 2016 | (Italy) Madonna di Campiglio | SL_{462} | (Norway) Henrik Kristoffersen | (Austria) Marcel Hirscher | (Italy) Stefano Gross | |
| 1649 | 13 | 27 December 2016 | (Italy) Santa Caterina | SG_{195} | (Norway) Kjetil Jansrud | (Austria) Hannes Reichelt | (Italy) Dominik Paris | |
| | | 28 December 2016 | (Italy) Santa Caterina | DH _{cnx} | excessive high winds | | | |
| 1650 | 14 | 29 December 2016 | (Italy) Santa Caterina | AC _{126} | (France) Alexis Pinturault | (Austria) Marcel Hirscher | (Norway) Aleksander Aamodt Kilde | |
| 1651 | 15 | 5 January 2017 | (Croatia) Zagreb | SL_{463} | (Italy) Manfred Mölgg | (Germany) Felix Neureuther | (Norway) Henrik Kristoffersen | |
| 1652 | 16 | 7 January 2017 | (Switzerland) Adelboden | GS_{394} | (France) Alexis Pinturault | (Austria) Marcel Hirscher | (Austria) Philipp Schörghofer | |
| 1653 | 17 | 8 January 2017 | (Switzerland) Adelboden | SL_{464} | (Norway) Henrik Kristoffersen | (Italy) Manfred Mölgg | (Austria) Marcel Hirscher | |
| 1654 | 18 | 13 January 2017 | (Switzerland) Wengen | AC_{127} | (Switzerland) Niels Hintermann | (France) Maxence Muzaton | (Austria) Frederic Berthold | |
| | | 14 January 2017 | (Switzerland) Wengen | DH _{cnx} | excess snow; replaced in Garmisch-Partenkirchen on 27 January 2017 | | | |
| 1655 | 19 | 15 January 2017 | (Switzerland) Wengen | SL_{465} | (Norway) Henrik Kristoffersen | (Austria) Marcel Hirscher | (Germany) Felix Neureuther | |
| 1656 | 20 | 20 January 2017 | (Austria) Kitzbühel | SG_{196} | (Austria) Matthias Mayer | (Italy) Christof Innerhofer | (Switzerland) Beat Feuz | |
| 1657 | 21 | 21 January 2017 | (Austria) Kitzbühel | DH_{465} | (Italy) Dominik Paris | (France) Valentin Giraud Moine | (France) Johan Clarey | |
| 1658 | 22 | 22 January 2017 | (Austria) Kitzbühel | SL_{466} | (Austria) Marcel Hirscher | (United Kingdom) Dave Ryding | (Russia) Aleksandr Khoroshilov | |
| 1659 | 23 | 24 January 2017 | (Austria) Schladming | SL_{467} | (Norway) Henrik Kristoffersen | (Austria) Marcel Hirscher | (Russia) Aleksandr Khoroshilov | |
| 1660 | 24 | 27 January 2017 | (Germany) Garmisch-Partenkirchen | DH_{466} | (United States) Travis Ganong | (Norway) Kjetil Jansrud | (Italy) Peter Fill | |
| 1661 | 25 | 28 January 2017 | (Germany) Garmisch-Partenkirchen | DH_{467} | (Austria) Hannes Reichelt | (Italy) Peter Fill | (Switzerland) Beat Feuz | |
| 1662 | 26 | 29 January 2017 | (Germany) Garmisch-Partenkirchen | GS_{395} | (Austria) Marcel Hirscher | (Sweden) Matts Olsson | (Germany) Stefan Luitz | |
| 1663 | 27 | 31 January 2017 | (Sweden) Stockholm | CE _{006} | (Germany) Linus Straßer | (France) Alexis Pinturault | (Sweden) Mattias Hargin | |
World Championships (6–19 February)
| 1664 | 28 | 24 February 2017 | (Norway) Kvitfjell | DH_{468} | (Slovenia) Boštjan Kline | (Austria) Matthias Mayer | (Norway) Kjetil Jansrud | |
| 1665 | 29 | 25 February 2017 | (Norway) Kvitfjell | DH_{469} | (Norway) Kjetil Jansrud | (Italy) Peter Fill | (Switzerland) Beat Feuz | |
| 1666 | 30 | 26 February 2017 | (Norway) Kvitfjell | SG_{197} | (Italy) Peter Fill | (Austria) Hannes Reichelt | (Canada) Erik Guay | |
| 1667 | 31 | 4 March 2017 | (Slovenia) Kranjska Gora | GS_{396} | (Austria) Marcel Hirscher | (Norway) Leif Kristian Haugen | (Sweden) Matts Olsson | |
| 1668 | 32 | 5 March 2017 | (Slovenia) Kranjska Gora | SL_{468} | (Austria) Michael Matt | (Italy) Stefano Gross | (Germany) Felix Neureuther | |
| 1669 | 33 | 15 March 2017 | (United States) Aspen | DH_{470} | (Italy) Dominik Paris | (Italy) Peter Fill | (Switzerland) Carlo Janka | |
| 1670 | 34 | 16 March 2017 | (United States) Aspen | SG_{198} | (Austria) Hannes Reichelt | (Italy) Dominik Paris | (Switzerland) Mauro Caviezel (Norway) Aleksander Aamodt Kilde | |
| 1671 | 35 | 18 March 2017 | (United States) Aspen | GS_{397} | (Austria) Marcel Hirscher | (Germany) Felix Neureuther | (France) Mathieu Faivre | |
| 1672 | 36 | 19 March 2017 | (United States) Aspen | SL_{469} | (Sweden) André Myhrer | (Germany) Felix Neureuther | (Austria) Michael Matt | |

=== Rankings ===
==== Overall ====
| Rank | after all 36 races | Points |
|---|---|---|
| 1 | (Austria) Marcel Hirscher | 1599 |
| 2 | (Norway) Kjetil Jansrud | 924 |
| 3 | (Norway) Henrik Kristoffersen | 903 |
| 4 | (France) Alexis Pinturault | 875 |
| 5 | (Germany) Felix Neureuther | 790 |

==== Downhill ====
| Rank | after all 8 races | Points |
|---|---|---|
| 1 | (Italy) Peter Fill | 454 |
| 2 | (Norway) Kjetil Jansrud | 431 |
| 3 | (Italy) Dominik Paris | 371 |
| 4 | (Switzerland) Beat Feuz | 259 |
| 5 | (Canada) Erik Guay | 255 |

==== Super G ====
| Rank | after all 6 races | Points |
|---|---|---|
| 1 | (Norway) Kjetil Jansrud | 394 |
| 2 | (Austria) Hannes Reichelt | 303 |
| 3 | (Norway) Aleksander Aamodt Kilde | 299 |
| 4 | (Italy) Dominik Paris | 277 |
| 5 | (Italy) Peter Fill | 226 |

==== Giant slalom ====
| Rank | after all 9 races | Points |
|---|---|---|
| 1 | (Austria) Marcel Hirscher | 733 |
| 2 | (France) Mathieu Faivre | 440 |
| 3 | (France) Alexis Pinturault | 439 |
| 4 | (Germany) Felix Neureuther | 370 |
| 5 | (Norway) Henrik Kristoffersen | 328 |

==== Slalom ====
| Rank | after all 11 races | Points |
|---|---|---|
| 1 | (Austria) Marcel Hirscher | 735 |
| 2 | (Norway) Henrik Kristoffersen | 575 |
| 3 | (Italy) Manfred Mölgg | 476 |
| 4 | (Germany) Felix Neureuther | 420 |
| 5 | (Austria) Michael Matt | 382 |

==== Alpine combined ====
| Rank | after all 2 races | Points |
|---|---|---|
| 1 | (France) Alexis Pinturault | 111 |
| 2 | (Switzerland) Niels Hintermann | 100 |
| 3 | (Norway) Aleksander Aamodt Kilde | 92 |
| 4 | (Switzerland) Justin Murisier | 86 |
| 5 | (Austria) Marcel Hirscher | 80 |
| 5 | (France) Maxence Muzaton | 80 |

== Women ==
Summary

Women's overall champion

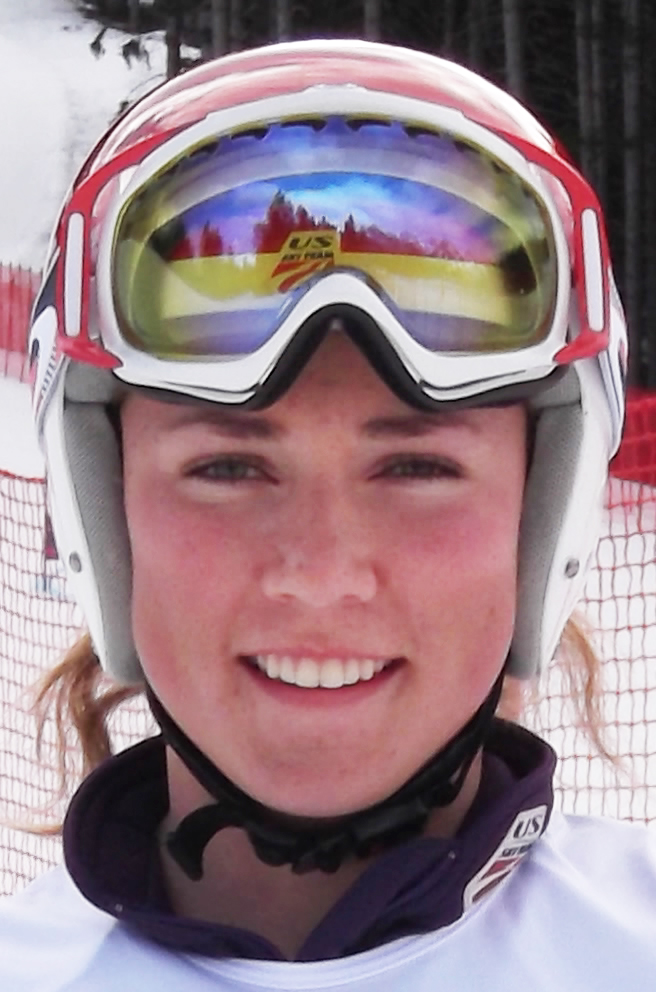
Mikaela Shiffrin. First American female to capture the Overall since 2012.

The women typically have had technical events in the U.S. in late November in Colorado at Aspen, but instead stopped this season in Vermont at Killington for its first effort as a World Cup venue. The most recent World Cup races in the Eastern U.S. were over a quarter century earlier, in March 1991 at Waterville Valley Resort, New Hampshire and the last World Cup races in Vermont were in 1978 at Stratton Mountain Resort. The women also had two Olympic venue orientation speed events in South Korea at the Jeongseon Alpine Centre in March, which produced identical podiums led by Sofia Goggia.

Injuries continued to affect several of the top racers. Two-time overall champion Anna Veith (née Fenninger) and three-time overall champion Lindsey Vonn both missed the first half of the season due to injuries suffered during the previous season, although both returned by mid-January and competed in the World Championships in early February. However, Veith then missed the end of the season as well to recover further from her injuries. In addition, defending overall champion Lara Gut suffered a season-ending injury during the World Championships, costing her a chance to repeat.

At the end of the season, Mikaela Shiffrin, who also won the slalom discipline for the fourth time and was second in the giant slalom, became the third American woman and fifth American overall to win the overall World Cup championship, joining men's champions Phil Mahre and Bode Miller and women's champions Tamara McKinney and Vonn. Additionally, women's super G champion Tina Weirather became a second-generation discipline champion, as her father (Harti Weirather) was downhill discipline champion in 1981 and both her mother (Hanni Wenzel) and uncle (Andreas Wenzel) won the overall World Cup championship. Weirather and her mother thus became the first mother-daughter pair to win season trophies in World Cup competition.

=== Calendar ===
Event key: DH – Downhill, SL – Slalom, GS – Giant slalom, SG – Super giant slalom, AC – Alpine combined, CE – City Event (Parallel)
| Race | Season | Date | Place | Type | Winner | Second | Third | Details |
|---|---|---|---|---|---|---|---|---|
| 1527 | 1 | 22 October 2016 | (Austria) Sölden | GS_{388} | (Switzerland) Lara Gut | (United States) Mikaela Shiffrin | (Italy) Marta Bassino | |
| 1528 | 2 | 12 November 2016 | (Finland) Levi | SL_{437} | (United States) Mikaela Shiffrin | (Switzerland) Wendy Holdener | (Slovakia) Petra Vlhová | |
| 1529 | 3 | 26 November 2016 | (United States) Killington | GS_{389} | (France) Tessa Worley | (Norway) Nina Løseth | (Italy) Sofia Goggia | |
| 1530 | 4 | 27 November 2016 | (United States) Killington | SL_{438} | (United States) Mikaela Shiffrin | (Slovakia) Veronika Velez-Zuzulová | (Switzerland) Wendy Holdener | |
| 1531 | 5 | 2 December 2016 | (Canada) Lake Louise | DH_{386} | (Slovenia) Ilka Štuhec | (Italy) Sofia Goggia | (Sweden) Kajsa Kling | |
| 1532 | 6 | 3 December 2016 | (Canada) Lake Louise | DH_{387} | (Slovenia) Ilka Štuhec | (Switzerland) Lara Gut | (Hungary) Edit Miklós | |
| 1533 | 7 | 4 December 2016 | (Canada) Lake Louise | SG_{212} | (Switzerland) Lara Gut | (Liechtenstein) Tina Weirather | (Italy) Sofia Goggia | |
| 1534 | 8 | 10 December 2016 | (Italy) Sestriere | GS_{390} | (France) Tessa Worley | (Italy) Sofia Goggia | (Switzerland) Lara Gut | |
| 1535 | 9 | 11 December 2016 | (Italy) Sestriere | SL_{439} | (United States) Mikaela Shiffrin | (Slovakia) Veronika Velez-Zuzulová | (Switzerland) Wendy Holdener | |
| 1536 | 10 | 16 December 2016 | (France) Val d'Isère | AC_{099} | (Slovenia) Ilka Štuhec | (Switzerland) Michelle Gisin | (Italy) Sofia Goggia | |
| 1537 | 11 | 17 December 2016 | (France) Val d'Isère | DH_{388} | (Slovenia) Ilka Štuhec | (Austria) Cornelia Hütter | (Italy) Sofia Goggia | |
| 1538 | 12 | 18 December 2016 | (France) Val d'Isère | SG_{213} | (Switzerland) Lara Gut | (Liechtenstein) Tina Weirather | (Italy) Elena Curtoni | |
| | | 20 December 2016 | (France) Courchevel | GS_{cnx} | terminated and excessive wind after race started; replaced in Semmering on 27 December 2016 | | | |
| 1539 | 13 | 27 December 2016 | (Austria) Semmering | GS_{391} | (United States) Mikaela Shiffrin | (France) Tessa Worley | (Italy) Manuela Mölgg | |
| 1540 | 14 | 28 December 2016 | (Austria) Semmering | GS_{392} | (United States) Mikaela Shiffrin | (France) Tessa Worley | (Germany) Viktoria Rebensburg | |
| 1541 | 15 | 29 December 2016 | (Austria) Semmering | SL_{440} | (United States) Mikaela Shiffrin | (Slovakia) Veronika Velez-Zuzulová | (Switzerland) Wendy Holdener | |
| 1542 | 16 | 3 January 2017 | (Croatia) Zagreb | SL_{441} | (Slovakia) Veronika Velez-Zuzulová | (Slovakia) Petra Vlhová | (Czech Republic) Šárka Strachová | |
| 1543 | 17 | 7 January 2017 | (Slovenia) Maribor | GS_{393} | (France) Tessa Worley | (Italy) Sofia Goggia | (Switzerland) Lara Gut | |
| 1544 | 18 | 8 January 2017 | (Slovenia) Maribor | SL_{442} | (United States) Mikaela Shiffrin | (Switzerland) Wendy Holdener | (Sweden) Frida Hansdotter | |
| 1545 | 19 | 10 January 2017 | (Austria) Flachau | SL_{443} | (Sweden) Frida Hansdotter | (Norway) Nina Løseth | (Switzerland) Wendy Holdener (United States) Mikaela Shiffrin | |
| | | 14 January 2017 | (Austria) Altenmarkt-Zauchensee | DH_{cnx} | postponed to following day; replaced in Altenmarkt-Zauchensee on 15 January 2017 | | | |
| 1546 | 20 | 15 January 2017 | (Austria) Altenmarkt-Zauchensee | DH_{389} | (Austria) Christine Scheyer | (Liechtenstein) Tina Weirather | (United States) Jacqueline Wiles | |
| | | 15 January 2017 | (Austria) Altenmarkt-Zauchensee | AC_{cnx} | postponed over switch with downhill; replaced in Crans-Montana on 24 February 2017 | | | |
| 1547 | 21 | 21 January 2017 | (Germany) Garmisch-Partenkirchen | DH_{390} | (United States) Lindsey Vonn | (Switzerland) Lara Gut | (Germany) Viktoria Rebensburg | |
| 1548 | 22 | 22 January 2017 | (Germany) Garmisch-Partenkirchen | SG_{214} | (Switzerland) Lara Gut | (Austria) Stephanie Venier | (Liechtenstein) Tina Weirather | |
| 1549 | 23 | 24 January 2017 | (Italy) Kronplatz | GS_{394} | (Italy) Federica Brignone | (France) Tessa Worley | (Italy) Marta Bassino | |
| 1550 | 24 | 28 January 2017 | (Italy) Cortina d'Ampezzo | DH_{391} | (Switzerland) Lara Gut | (Italy) Sofia Goggia | (Slovenia) Ilka Štuhec | |
| 1551 | 25 | 29 January 2017 | (Italy) Cortina d'Ampezzo | SG_{215} | (Slovenia) Ilka Štuhec | (Italy) Sofia Goggia | (Austria) Anna Veith | |
| 1552 | 26 | 31 January 2017 | (Sweden) Stockholm | CE_{006} | (United States) Mikaela Shiffrin | (Slovakia) Veronika Velez-Zuzulová | (Norway) Nina Løseth | |
World Championships (6–19 February)
| 1553 | 27 | 24 February 2017 | (Switzerland) Crans-Montana | AC_{100} | (Italy) Federica Brignone | (Slovenia) Ilka Štuhec | (Austria) Michaela Kirchgasser | |
| 1554 | 28 | 25 February 2017 | (Switzerland) Crans-Montana | SG_{216} | (Slovenia) Ilka Štuhec | (Italy) Elena Curtoni | (Austria) Stephanie Venier | |
| 1555 | 29 | 26 February 2017 | (Switzerland) Crans-Montana | AC_{101} | (United States) Mikaela Shiffrin | (Italy) Federica Brignone | (Slovenia) Ilka Štuhec | |
| 1556 | 30 | 4 March 2017 | (South Korea) Jeongseon | DH_{392} | (Italy) Sofia Goggia | (United States) Lindsey Vonn | (Slovenia) Ilka Štuhec | |
| 1557 | 31 | 5 March 2017 | (South Korea) Jeongseon | SG_{217} | (Italy) Sofia Goggia | (United States) Lindsey Vonn | (Slovenia) Ilka Štuhec | |
| 1558 | 32 | 10 March 2017 | (United States) Squaw Valley | GS_{395} | (United States) Mikaela Shiffrin | (Italy) Federica Brignone | (France) Tessa Worley | |
| 1559 | 33 | 11 March 2017 | (United States) Squaw Valley | SL_{444} | (United States) Mikaela Shiffrin | (Czech Republic) Šárka Strachová | (Austria) Bernadette Schild | |
| 1560 | 34 | 15 March 2017 | (United States) Aspen | DH_{393} | (Slovenia) Ilka Štuhec | (United States) Lindsey Vonn | (Italy) Sofia Goggia | |
| 1561 | 35 | 16 March 2017 | (United States) Aspen | SG_{218} | (Liechtenstein) Tina Weirather | (Slovenia) Ilka Štuhec | (Italy) Federica Brignone | |
| 1562 | 36 | 18 March 2017 | (United States) Aspen | SL_{445} | (Slovakia) Petra Vlhová | (United States) Mikaela Shiffrin | (Sweden) Frida Hansdotter | |
| 1563 | 37 | 19 March 2017 | (United States) Aspen | GS_{396} | (Italy) Federica Brignone | (Italy) Sofia Goggia | (Italy) Marta Bassino | |

=== Rankings ===
==== Overall ====
| Rank | after all 37 races | Points |
|---|---|---|
| 1 | (United States) Mikaela Shiffrin | 1643 |
| 2 | (Slovenia) Ilka Štuhec | 1325 |
| 3 | (Italy) Sofia Goggia | 1197 |
| 4 | (Switzerland) Lara Gut | 1023 |
| 5 | (Italy) Federica Brignone | 895 |

==== Downhill ====
| Rank | after all 8 races | Points |
|---|---|---|
| 1 | (Slovenia) Ilka Štuhec | 597 |
| 2 | (Italy) Sofia Goggia | 460 |
| 3 | (Switzerland) Lara Gut | 360 |
| 4 | (United States) Lindsey Vonn | 280 |
| 5 | (Liechtenstein) Tina Weirather | 256 |

==== Super G ====
| Rank | after all 7 races | Points |
|---|---|---|
| 1 | (Liechtenstein) Tina Weirather | 435 |
| 2 | (Slovenia) Ilka Štuhec | 430 |
| 3 | (Switzerland) Lara Gut | 300 |
| 4 | (Italy) Elena Curtoni | 271 |
| 5 | (Austria) Stephanie Venier | 255 |

==== Giant slalom ====
| Rank | after all 9 races | Points |
|---|---|---|
| 1 | (France) Tessa Worley | 685 |
| 2 | (United States) Mikaela Shiffrin | 600 |
| 3 | (Italy) Sofia Goggia | 405 |
| 4 | (Italy) Federica Brignone | 370 |
| 5 | (Switzerland) Lara Gut | 360 |

==== Slalom ====
| Rank | after all 10 races | Points |
|---|---|---|
| 1 | (United States) Mikaela Shiffrin | 840 |
| 2 | (Slovakia) Veronika Velez-Zuzulová | 565 |
| 3 | (Switzerland) Wendy Holdener | 455 |
| 4 | (Sweden) Frida Hansdotter | 432 |
| 5 | (Slovakia) Petra Vlhová | 411 |

==== Alpine combined ====
| Rank | after all 3 races | Points |
|---|---|---|
| 1 | (Slovenia) Ilka Štuhec | 240 |
| 2 | (Italy) Federica Brignone | 220 |
| 3 | (Switzerland) Wendy Holdener | 140 |
| 4 | (Austria) Michaela Kirchgasser | 105 |
| 5 | (Switzerland) Michelle Gisin | 104 |

== Alpine team event ==
Event key: PG – Parallel giant slalom
| Race | Season | Date | Place | Type | Winner | Second | Third | Details |
|---|---|---|---|---|---|---|---|---|
| 12 | 1 | 17 March 2017 | (United States) Aspen | PG _{009} | Sweden Frida Hansdotter; Maria Pietilä Holmner; Emelie Wikström; Mattias Hargin; André Myhrer; Matts Olsson | Germany Lena Dürr; Christina Geiger; Marina Wallner; Stefan Luitz; Felix Neureuther; Linus Straßer | France Adeline Baud Mugnier; Coralie Frasse Sombet; Jean-Baptiste Grange; Julien Lizeroux; Cyprien Sarrazin | |

== Nations Cup ==
Overall

| Rank | after all 74 races | Points |
|---|---|---|
| 1 | Austria | 8966 |
| 2 | Italy | 8407 |
| 3 | Switzerland | 6292 |
| 4 | France | 5285 |
| 5 | Norway | 4932 |

Men

| Rank | after all 36 races | Points |
|---|---|---|
| 1 | Austria | 5048 |
| 2 | France | 3668 |
| 3 | Norway | 3589 |
| 4 | Italy | 3496 |
| 5 | Switzerland | 2738 |

Women

| Rank | after all 37 races | Points |
|---|---|---|
| 1 | Italy | 4911 |
| 2 | Austria | 3918 |
| 3 | Switzerland | 3554 |
| 4 | United States | 3082 |
| 5 | Slovenia | 1958 |

== Prize money ==
Top-5 Men

| Rank | after all 36 races | CHF |
|---|---|---|
| 1 | (Austria) Marcel Hirscher | 528'878 |
| 2 | (Norway) Henrik Kristoffersen | 294'722 |
| 3 | (Norway) Kjetil Jansrud | 283'447 |
| 4 | (France) Alexis Pinturault | 257'735 |
| 5 | (Italy) Dominik Paris | 191'837 |

Top-5 Women

| Rank | after all 37 races | CHF |
|---|---|---|
| 1 | (United States) Mikaela Shiffrin | 597'692 |
| 2 | (Slovenia) Ilka Štuhec | 414'314 |
| 3 | (Switzerland) Lara Gut | 310'418 |
| 4 | (Italy) Sofia Goggia | 281'211 |
| 5 | (France) Tessa Worley | 230'673 |

== Podium table by nation ==
Table showing the World Cup podium places (gold–1st place, silver–2nd place, bronze–3rd place) by the countries represented by the athletes.

| Rank | Nation | Gold | Silver | Bronze | Total |
|---|---|---|---|---|---|
| 1 | United States | 13 | 5 | 3 | 21 |
| 2 | Austria | 12 | 15 | 8 | 35 |
| 3 | Norway | 10 | 7 | 8 | 25 |
| 4 | Italy | 9 | 17 | 17 | 43 |
| 5 | France | 9 | 7 | 5 | 21 |
| 6 | Slovenia | 8 | 2 | 4 | 14 |
| 7 | Switzerland | 6 | 6 | 11 | 23 |
| 8 | Sweden | 3 | 1 | 5 | 9 |
| 9 | Slovakia | 2 | 5 | 1 | 8 |
| 10 | Germany | 1 | 4 | 6 | 11 |
| 11 | Liechtenstein | 1 | 3 | 1 | 5 |
| 12 | Czech Republic | 0 | 1 | 1 | 2 |
| 13 | Great Britain | 0 | 1 | 0 | 1 |
| 14 | Russia | 0 | 0 | 3 | 3 |
| 15 | Canada | 0 | 0 | 2 | 2 |
| 16 | Hungary | 0 | 0 | 1 | 1 |
| Totals (16 entries) | | 74 | 74 | 76 | 224 |
