= 2018–19 FIS Alpine Ski Europa Cup =

Alpine skiing competition

Discipline	Men	Women
Overall	(Italy) Simon Maurberger	(Austria) Elisabeth Reisinger
Downhill	(Switzerland) Nils Mani	(Austria) Elisabeth Reisinger
Super-G	(France) Roy Piccard	(Austria) Elisabeth Reisinger
Giant Slalom	(Norway) Lucas Braathen	(Norway) Kaja Norbye
Slalom	(Croatia) Istok Rodeš	(Italy) Lara Della Mea
Combined	(France) Sam Alphand	(Switzerland) Nicole Good

Competition
Individual	35	34

2018–19 FIS Alpine Ski Europa Cup was the 48th season of the FIS Alpine Ski Europa Cup.

== Standings ==
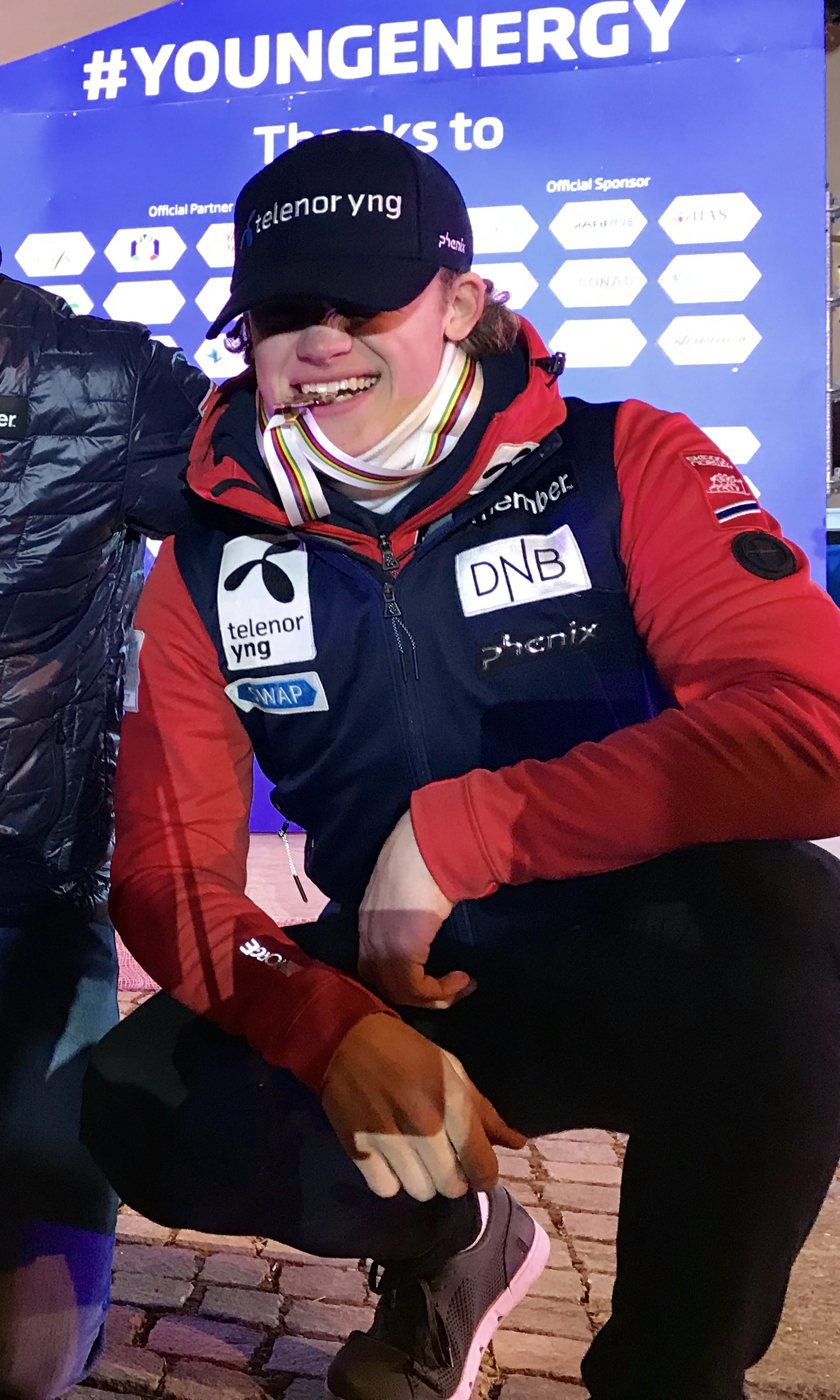
Lucas Braathen, the winner of the men's slalom Cup.

=== Overall ===
Men

Rank	Skier	Country	Points
1	Simon Maurberger	Italy	745
2	Stefan Rogentin	Switzerland	714
3	Timon Haugan	Norway	600
4	Lucas Braathen	Norway	592
5	Christopher Neumayer	Austria	572
6	Roy Piccard	France	496
7	Davide Cazzaniga	Italy	494
8	Stefan Babinsky	Austria	476
9	Bjørnar Neteland	Norway	406
10	Andrea Ballerin	Italy	403

Women

Rank	Skier	Country	Points
1	Elisabeth Reisinger	Austria	975
2	Roberta Melesi	Italy	793
3	Kaja Norbye	Norway	639
4	Marlene Schmotz	Germany	622
5	Michaela Heider	Austria	618
6	Ylva Stålnacke	Sweden	593
7	Nathalie Gröbli	Switzerland	509
8	Nadia Delago	Italy	496
9	Maryna Gąsienica-Daniel	Poland	424
10	Lara Della Mea	Italy	423

=== Downhill ===
Men

Rank	Skier	Country	Points
1	Nils Mani	Switzerland	315
2	Victor Schuller	France	280
3	Davide Cazzaniga	Italy	277
4	Christopher Neumayer	Austria	246
5	Urs Kryenbühl	Switzerland	235

Women

Rank	Skier	Country	Points
1	Elisabeth Reisinger	Austria	526
2	Nadia Delago	Italy	445
3	Juliana Suter	Switzerland	300
4	Nathalie Gröbli	Switzerland	221
5	Luana Flütsch	Switzerland	220

=== Super-G ===
Men

Rank	Skier	Country	Points
1	Roy Piccard	France	428
2	Stefan Rogentin	Switzerland	426
3	Stefan Babinsky	Austria	305
4	Christopher Neumayer	Austria	276
5	Gino Caviezel	Switzerland	218

Women

Rank	Skier	Country	Points
1	Elisabeth Reisinger	Austria	340
2	Roberta Melesi	Italy	243
3	Michaela Heider	Austria	231
4	Christina Ager	Austria	215
4	Nina Ortlieb	Austria	215

=== Giant Slalom ===
Men

Rank	Skier	Country	Points
1	Lucas Braathen	Norway	560
2	Bjørnar Neteland	Norway	406
3	Andrea Ballerin	Italy	381
4	Cédric Noger	Switzerland	379
5	Fabian Wilkens Solheim	Norway	366

Women

Rank	Skier	Country	Points
1	Kaja Norbye	Norway	401
2	Roberta Melesi	Italy	392
3	Ylva Stålnacke	Sweden	382
4	Maryna Gąsienica-Daniel	Poland	374
5	Marlene Schmotz	Germany	349

=== Slalom ===
Men

Rank	Skier	Country	Points
1	Istok Rodeš	Croatia	350
2	Timon Haugan	Norway	347
3	Alexander Choroschilow	Russia	325
4	Simon Maurberger	Italy	323
5	Bjørn Brudevoll	Norway	282

Women

Rank	Skier	Country	Points
1	Lara Della Mea	Italy	398
2	Gabriela Capová	Czech Republic	353
3	Marlene Schmotz	Germany	273
4	Emelie Wikström	Sweden	262
5	Charlotta Säfvenberg	Sweden	245

=== Combined ===
Men

Rank	Skier	Country	Points
1	Sam Alphand	France	109
2	Christof Brandner	Germany	100
2	Simon Maurberger	Italy	100
4	Stefan Rogentin	Switzerland	92
5	Raphael Haaser	Austria	80

Women

Rank	Skier	Country	Points
1	Nicole Good	Switzerland	160
2	Nathalie Gröbli	Switzerland	110
3	Elisabeth Reisinger	Austria	109
4	Anne-Sophie Barthet	France	100
5	Ida Dannewitz	Sweden	98
