= 2022–23 FIS Alpine Ski World Cup =

International sports competition

Discipline	Men	Women
Overall	(Switzerland) Marco Odermatt (2)	(United States) Mikaela Shiffrin (5)
Downhill	(Norway) Aleksander Aamodt Kilde (2)	(Italy) Sofia Goggia (4)
Super-G	(Switzerland) Marco Odermatt (1)	(Switzerland) Lara Gut-Behrami (4)
Giant slalom	(Switzerland) Marco Odermatt (2)	(United States) Mikaela Shiffrin (2)
Slalom	(Norway) Lucas Braathen (1)	(United States) Mikaela Shiffrin (7)
Nations Cup	Switzerland (9)	Switzerland (11)
- Nations Cup Overall: Switzerland (10)

Competition
Edition	57th	57th
Locations	21	20
Individual	41	41
Mixed	1	1
Cancelled	7	5
Rescheduled	2	1

Overall champions

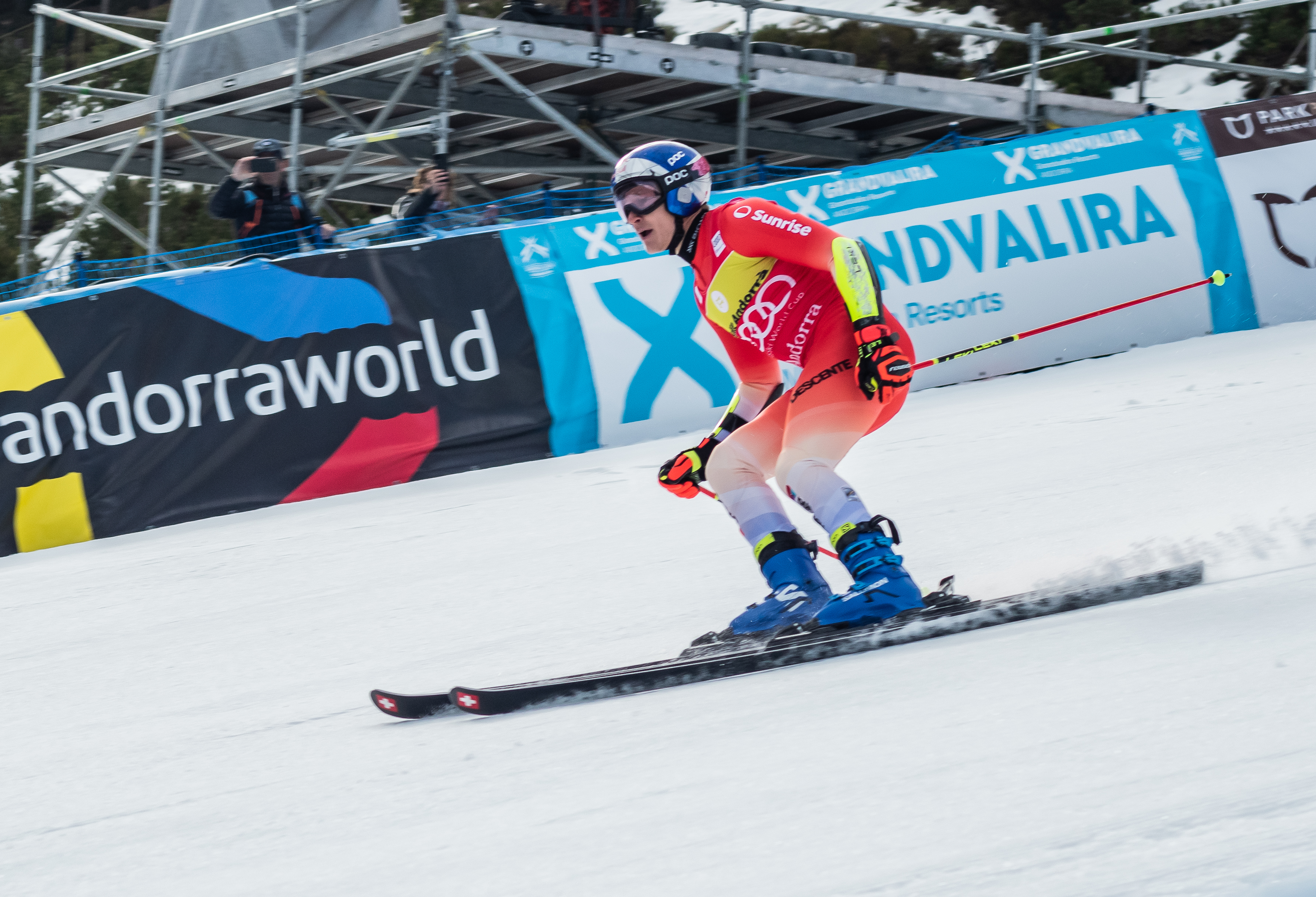
Marco Odermatt defended the World Cup title, winning 13 times this season and setting a new men's record for the number of points scored.

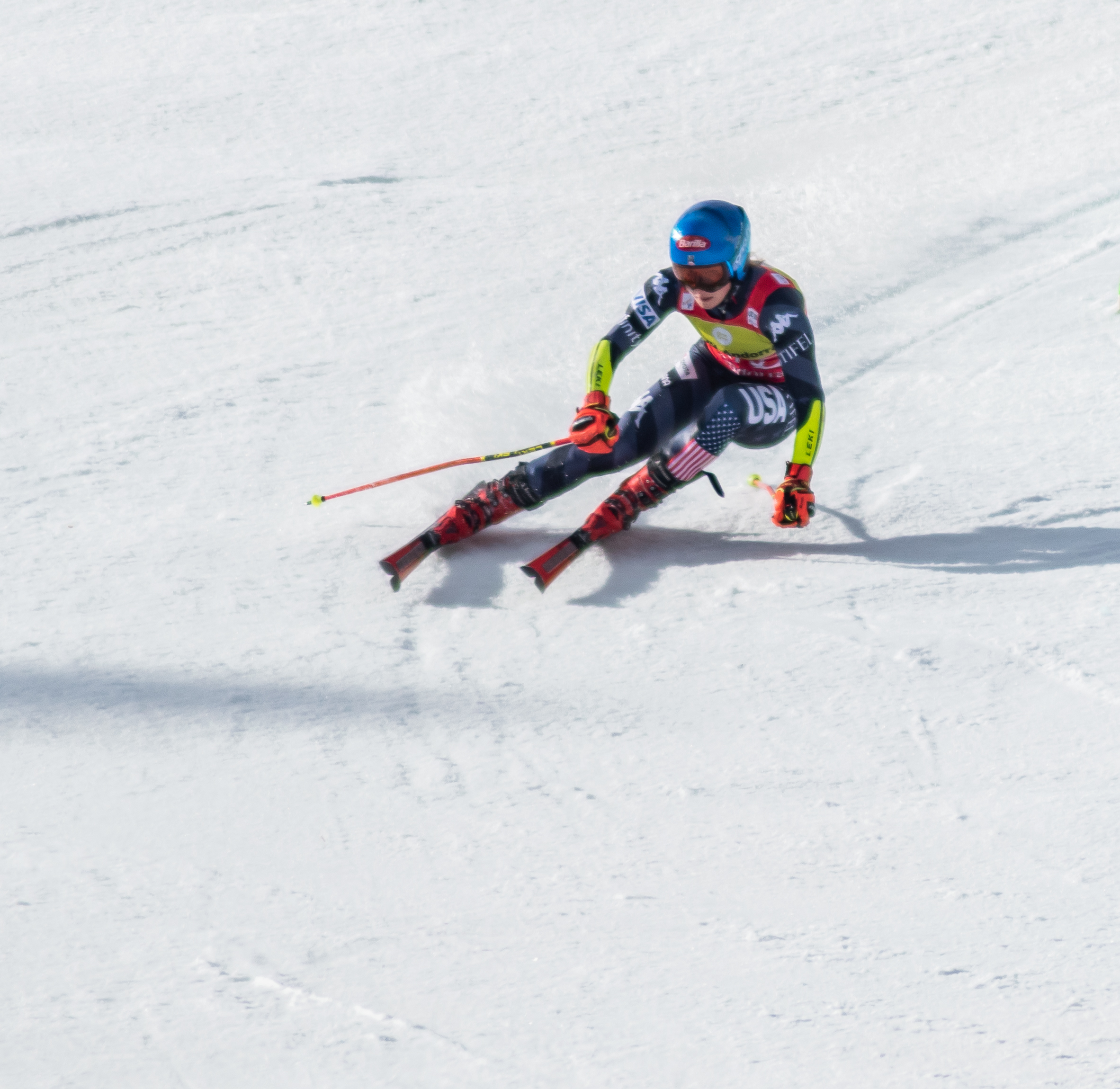
Mikaela Shiffrin won her fifth overall World Cup title in history.

The International Ski Federation (FIS) Alpine Ski World Cup is the premier circuit for alpine skiing competition. The inaugural season launched in January 1967, and the 2022–23 season marks the 57th consecutive year for the FIS World Cup.

This season started in October 2022 in Sölden, Austria, and concluded in mid-March 2023 at the finals in Soldeu, Andorra.

Marco Odermatt and Mikaela Shiffrin were the defending overall champions from the 2021–22 season. They each successfully defended the title.

On 24 January, Shiffrin passed the previous record held by Lindsey Vonn for the most wins in the women's World Cup (83), and was tied with overall record holder Ingemar Stenmark (86). On 11 March, Shiffrin made her 87th World Cup victory by winning the women's slalom in Åre, thereby overtaking Stenmark's 34-year-old record.

47th FIS Alpine World Ski Championships in France, the highlight of the season, was held from 6–19 February 2023, on two different but nearby ski venues in French Alps; the "Roc de Fer" course in Méribel hosted all women's events and all parallel events, and the "L'Éclipse" course in Courchevel hosted the five classic men's events (downhill, Super-G, giant slalom, slalom, and combined).

There have been many cancelations and replacements in the season due to hard weather conditions or lack of snow. The only parallel event for both men and women was canceled and not replaced, as well as four downhills for the men and two downhills and a Super-G for the women.

== Map of world cup hosts ==
All 38 locations hosting world cup events for men (25), women (24), and shared (10) this season.

(Austria) Sölden	(Austria) Lech/Zürs	(Canada) Lake Louise	(United States) Beaver Creek
Rettenbach	Flexenarena	Men's Olympic Downhill	Birds of Prey
(France) Val d'Isère	(United States) Palisades Tahoe	(Italy) Val Gardena/Gröden	(Italy) Alta Badia
La face de Bellevarde	Red Dog	Saslong	Gran Risa
(Italy) Madonna di Campiglio	(Italy) Bormio	(Switzerland) Adelboden	(Slovenia) Kranjska Gora
Canalone Miramonti	Stelvio	Chuenisbärgli	Podkoren 3
Europe
North Italy		Austria	
North America		Switzerland	
(Italy) Cervinia	(Austria) Schladming	(Austria) Kitzbühel	
Gobba di Rollin	Planai	Streif	Ganslern
(United States) Killington	(Finland) Levi	(Switzerland) Wengen	
Superstar	Levi Black	Lauberhorn	Männlichen
(Italy) Cortina d'Ampezzo	(Croatia) Zagreb	(Germany) Garmisch-Partenkirchen	
Olimpia delle Tofane	Crveni spust	Kandahar 1	Gudiberg

Women Men Shared

== Men ==
The number of races in the World Cup history

Total	DH	SG	GS	SL	AC	PS	PG	CE	K.O.	Winners
1892	524	238	447	528	134	2	8	10	1	304

after SL in Soldeu (19 March 2023)

=== Calendar ===
Event key: DH – Downhill, SL – Slalom, GS – Giant slalom, SG – Super giant slalom, PG – Parallel giant slalom
All	#	Date	Venue	Type	Winner	Second	Third	R.
1855	1	23 October 2022	(Austria) Sölden (Rettenbach 68.2%)	GS _{438}	(Switzerland) Marco Odermatt	(Slovenia) Žan Kranjec	(Norway) Henrik Kristoffersen	
		29 October 2022	(Switzerland) (Italy) Zermatt/Cervinia (Gran Becca)	DH _{cnx}	cancelled due to lack of snow			
		30 October 2022	(Switzerland) (Italy) Zermatt/Cervinia (Gran Becca)	DH _{cnx}	cancelled due to lack of snow			
		13 November 2022	(Austria) Lech/Zürs (Flexenarena 50%)	PG _{cnx}	cancelled due to bad weather			
		25 November 2022	(Canada) Lake Louise (Men's Olympic 53%)	DH _{cnx}	cancelled due to bad weather and moved to 26 November			
		26 November 2022	(Canada) Lake Louise (Men's Olympic 53%)	SG _{cnx}	due to program changes moved to Cortina d'Ampezzo on 28 January			
1856	2	26 November 2022	(Canada) Lake Louise (Men's Olympic 53%)	DH _{515}	(Norway) Aleksander Aamodt Kilde	(Austria) Daniel Hemetsberger	(Switzerland) Marco Odermatt	
1857	3	27 November 2022	(Canada) Lake Louise (Men's Olympic 53%)	SG _{231}	(Switzerland) Marco Odermatt	(Norway) Aleksander Aamodt Kilde	(Austria) Matthias Mayer	
		2 December 2022	(United States) Beaver Creek (Birds of Prey 68%)	DH _{cnx}	cancelled due to heavy snow and moved to Val Gardena/Gröden on 15 December			
1858	4	3 December 2022	(United States) Beaver Creek (Birds of Prey 68%)	DH _{516}	(Norway) Aleksander Aamodt Kilde	(Switzerland) Marco Odermatt	(Canada) James Crawford	
1859	5	4 December 2022	(United States) Beaver Creek (Birds of Prey 68%)	SG _{232}	(Norway) Aleksander Aamodt Kilde	(Switzerland) Marco Odermatt	(France) Alexis Pinturault	
1860	6	10 December 2022	(France) Val d'Isère (La face de Bellevarde 71%)	GS _{439}	(Switzerland) Marco Odermatt	(Austria) Manuel Feller	(Slovenia) Žan Kranjec	
1861	7	11 December 2022	(France) Val d'Isère (La face de Bellevarde 71%)	SL _{519}	(Norway) Lucas Braathen	(Austria) Manuel Feller	(Switzerland) Loïc Meillard	
1862	8	15 December 2022	(Italy) Val Gardena/Gröden (Saslong 56.9%)	DH _{517}	(Austria) Vincent Kriechmayr	(Switzerland) Marco Odermatt	(Austria) Matthias Mayer	(Note: Men's cancelled downhill from Beaver Creek was rescheduled to Val Gardena/Gröden on 15 December 2022.)
		16 December 2022	(Italy) Val Gardena/Gröden (Saslong 56.9%)	SG _{cnx}	cancelled due to bad weather and moved to Cortina d'Ampezzo on 29 January			
1863	9	17 December 2022	(Italy) Val Gardena/Gröden (Saslong 56.9%)	DH _{518}	(Norway) Aleksander Aamodt Kilde	(France) Johan Clarey	(Italy) Mattia Casse	
1864	10	18 December 2022	(Italy) Alta Badia (Gran Risa 69%)	GS _{440}	(Norway) Lucas Braathen	(Norway) Henrik Kristoffersen	(Switzerland) Marco Odermatt	
1865	11	19 December 2022	(Italy) Alta Badia (Gran Risa 69%)	GS _{441}	(Switzerland) Marco Odermatt	(Norway) Henrik Kristoffersen	(Slovenia) Žan Kranjec	
1866	12	22 December 2022	(Italy) Madonna di Campiglio (Canalone Miramonti 60%)	SL _{520}	(Switzerland) Daniel Yule	(Norway) Henrik Kristoffersen	(Germany) Linus Straßer	
1867	13	28 December 2022	(Italy) Bormio (Stelvio 63%)	DH _{519}	(Austria) Vincent Kriechmayr	(Canada) James Crawford	(Norway) Aleksander Aamodt Kilde	
1868	14	29 December 2022	(Italy) Bormio (Stelvio 63%)	SG _{233}	(Switzerland) Marco Odermatt	(Austria) Vincent Kriechmayr	(Switzerland) Loïc Meillard	
1869	15	4 January 2023	(Germany) Garmisch-Partenkirchen (Gudiberg 58%)	SL _{521}	(Norway) Henrik Kristoffersen	(Austria) Manuel Feller	(France) Clément Noël	
1870	16	7 January 2023	(Switzerland) Adelboden (Chuenisbärgli 60%)	GS _{442}	(Switzerland) Marco Odermatt	(Norway) Henrik Kristoffersen	(Switzerland) Loïc Meillard	
1871	17	8 January 2023	(Switzerland) Adelboden (Chuenisbärgli 60%)	SL _{522}	(Norway) Lucas Braathen	(Norway) Atle Lie McGrath	(Germany) Linus Straßer	
1872	18	13 January 2023	(Switzerland) Wengen (Lauberhorn 90%)	SG _{234}	(Norway) Aleksander Aamodt Kilde	(Switzerland) Stefan Rogentin	(Switzerland) Marco Odermatt	
1873	19	14 January 2023	(Switzerland) Wengen (Lauberhorn 90%)	DH _{520}	(Norway) Aleksander Aamodt Kilde	(Switzerland) Marco Odermatt	(Italy) Mattia Casse	
1874	20	15 January 2023	(Switzerland) Wengen (Männlichen 72%)	SL _{523}	(Norway) Henrik Kristoffersen	(Switzerland) Loïc Meillard	(Norway) Lucas Braathen	
1875	21	20 January 2023	(Austria) Kitzbühel (Streif 85%)	DH _{521}	(Austria) Vincent Kriechmayr	(Italy) Florian Schieder	(Switzerland) Niels Hintermann	
1876	22	21 January 2023	(Austria) Kitzbühel (Streif 85%)	DH _{522}	(Norway) Aleksander Aamodt Kilde	(France) Johan Clarey	(United States) Travis Ganong	
1877	23	22 January 2023	(Austria) Kitzbühel (Ganslern 70%)	SL _{524}	(Switzerland) Daniel Yule	(United Kingdom) Dave Ryding	(Norway) Lucas Braathen	
1878	24	24 January 2023	(Austria) Schladming (Planai 54%)	SL _{525}	(France) Clément Noël	(Switzerland) Ramon Zenhäusern	(Norway) Lucas Braathen	
1879	25	(Note: Men's cancelled giant slalom from Garmisch-Partenkirchen was rescheduled to Schladming on 25 January 2023.)25 January 2023	(Austria) Schladming (Planai 54%)	GS _{443}	(Switzerland) Loïc Meillard	(Switzerland) Gino Caviezel	(Austria) Marco Schwarz	
		28 January 2023	(Germany) Garmisch-Partenkirchen (Kandahar 1 85%)	DH _{cnx}	cancelled due to lack of snow			
		29 January 2023	(Germany) Garmisch-Partenkirchen (Kandahar 1 85%)	GS _{cnx}	cancelled due to lack of snow and moved to Schladming on 25 January			
1880	26	(Note: Men's cancelled Super-G from Lake Louise was rescheduled to Cortina d'Ampezzo on 28 January 2023.)28 January 2023	(Italy) Cortina d'Ampezzo (Olimpia delle Tofane 65%)	SG _{235}	(Switzerland) Marco Odermatt	(Norway) Aleksander Aamodt Kilde	(Italy) Mattia Casse	
1881	27	(Note: Men's cancelled Super-G from Val Gardena was rescheduled to Cortina d'Ampezzo on 29 January 2023.)29 January 2023	(Italy) Cortina d'Ampezzo (Olimpia delle Tofane 65%)	SG _{236}	(Switzerland) Marco Odermatt	(Italy) Dominik Paris	(Austria) Daniel Hemetsberger	
1882	28	4 February 2023	(France) Chamonix (La Verte des Houches)	SL _{526}	(Switzerland) Ramon Zenhäusern	(Greece) AJ Ginnis	(Switzerland) Daniel Yule	
FIS Alpine World Ski Championships 2023 (7 – 19 February • Courchevel / Méribel, France)
1883	29	25 February 2023	(United States) Palisades Tahoe (Red Dog)	GS _{444}	(Austria) Marco Schwarz	(Switzerland) Marco Odermatt	(Norway) Rasmus Windingstad	
1884	30	26 February 2023	(United States) Palisades Tahoe (Red Dog)	SL _{527}	(Norway) Alexander Steen Olsen	(Norway) Timon Haugan	(France) Clément Noël (Bulgaria) Albert Popov	
		3 March 2023	(United States) Aspen (Ruthie's Run)	DH _{cnx}	cancelled due to strong wind			
1885	31	4 March 2023	(United States) Aspen (Ruthie's Run)	DH _{523}	(Norway) Aleksander Aamodt Kilde	(Canada) James Crawford	(Switzerland) Marco Odermatt	
1886	32	5 March 2023	(United States) Aspen (Ruthie's Run)	SG _{237}	(Switzerland) Marco Odermatt	(Germany) Andreas Sander	(Norway) Aleksander Aamodt Kilde	
1887	33	11 March 2023	(Slovenia) Kranjska Gora (Podkoren 3 59%)	GS _{445}	(Switzerland) Marco Odermatt	(France) Alexis Pinturault	(Norway) Henrik Kristoffersen	
1888	34	12 March 2023	(Slovenia) Kranjska Gora (Podkoren 3 59%)	GS _{446}	(Switzerland) Marco Odermatt	(Norway) Henrik Kristoffersen	(France) Alexis Pinturault	
World Cup Season Final
1889	35	15 March 2023	(Andorra) Soldeu (Àliga)	DH _{524}	(Austria) Vincent Kriechmayr	(Germany) Romed Baumann	(Germany) Andreas Sander	
1890	36	16 March 2023	(Andorra) Soldeu (Àliga)	SG _{238}	(Switzerland) Marco Odermatt	(Austria) Marco Schwarz	(Norway) Aleksander Aamodt Kilde	
1891	37	18 March 2023	(Andorra) Soldeu (Avet)	GS _{447}	(Switzerland) Marco Odermatt	(Norway) Henrik Kristoffersen	(Austria) Marco Schwarz	
1892	38	19 March 2023	(Andorra) Soldeu (Avet)	SL _{528}	(Switzerland) Ramon Zenhäusern	(Norway) Lucas Braathen	(Norway) Henrik Kristoffersen	

=== Rankings ===
==== Overall ====
Rank	after all 38 races	Points
	(Switzerland) Marco Odermatt	2042
2	(Norway) Aleksander Aamodt Kilde	1340
3	(Norway) Henrik Kristoffersen	1154
4	(Norway) Lucas Braathen	954
5	(Austria) Vincent Kriechmayr	953

==== Downhill ====
Rank	after all 10 races	Points
	(Norway) Aleksander Aamodt Kilde	760
2	(Austria) Vincent Kriechmayr	614
3	(Switzerland) Marco Odermatt	462
4	(France) Johan Clarey	343
5	(Canada) James Crawford	326

==== Super-G ====
Rank	after all 8 races	Points
	(Switzerland) Marco Odermatt	740
2	(Norway) Aleksander Aamodt Kilde	512
3	(Austria) Vincent Kriechmayr	335
4	(Germany) Andreas Sander	265
5	(France) Alexis Pinturault	253

==== Giant slalom ====
Rank	after all 10 races	Points
	(Switzerland) Marco Odermatt	840
2	(Norway) Henrik Kristoffersen	660
3	(Slovenia) Žan Kranjec	464
4	(Austria) Marco Schwarz	449
5	(France) Alexis Pinturault	409

==== Slalom ====
Rank	after all 10 races	Points
	(Norway) Lucas Braathen	546
2	(Norway) Henrik Kristoffersen	494
3	(Switzerland) Ramon Zenhäusern	467
4	(Switzerland) Daniel Yule	401
5	(Austria) Manuel Feller	345

== Women ==
The number of races in the World Cup history

Total	DH	SG	GS	SL	AC	PS	PG	CE	K.O.	Winners
1772	442	261	445	498	106	6	3	10	1	257

after GS in Soldeu (19 March 2023)

=== Calendar ===
Event key: DH – Downhill, SL – Slalom, GS – Giant slalom, SG – Super giant slalom, PG – Parallel giant slalom
All	#	Date	Venue	Type	Winner	Second	Third	R.
		22 October 2022	(Austria) Sölden (Rettenbach 68.2%)	GS _{cnx}	cancelled due to bad weather (moved to Semmering on 27 December)			
		5 November 2022	(Switzerland) (Italy) Zermatt/Cervinia (Gran Becca)	DH _{cnx}	cancelled due to bad weather			
		6 November 2022	(Switzerland) (Italy) Zermatt/Cervinia (Gran Becca)	DH _{cnx}	cancelled due to bad weather			
		13 November 2022	(Austria) Lech/Zürs (Flexenarena 50%)	PG _{cnx}	cancelled due to bad weather			
1735	1	19 November 2022	(Finland) Levi (Levi Black 52%)	SL _{488}	(United States) Mikaela Shiffrin	(Sweden) Anna Swenn-Larsson	(Slovakia) Petra Vlhová	
1736	2	20 November 2022	(Finland) Levi (Levi Black 52%)	SL _{489}	(United States) Mikaela Shiffrin	(Switzerland) Wendy Holdener	(Slovakia) Petra Vlhová	
1737	3	26 November 2022	(United States) Killington (Superstar)	GS _{436}	(Switzerland) Lara Gut-Behrami	(Italy) Marta Bassino	(Sweden) Sara Hector	
1738	4	27 November 2022	(United States) Killington (Superstar)	SL _{490}	(Switzerland) Wendy Holdener (Sweden) Anna Swenn-Larsson		(Austria) Katharina Truppe	
1739	5	2 December 2022	(Canada) Lake Louise (Men's Olympic 53%)	DH _{434}	(Italy) Sofia Goggia	(Switzerland) Corinne Suter	(Austria) Cornelia Hütter	
1740	6	3 December 2022	(Canada) Lake Louise (Men's Olympic 53%)	DH _{435}	(Italy) Sofia Goggia	(Austria) Nina Ortlieb	(Switzerland) Corinne Suter	
1741	7	4 December 2022	(Canada) Lake Louise (Men's Olympic 53%)	SG _{254}	(Switzerland) Corinne Suter	(Austria) Cornelia Hütter	(Norway) Ragnhild Mowinckel	
1742	8	10 December 2022	(Italy) Sestriere (Pista Gianni A. Agnelli)	GS _{437}	(Italy) Marta Bassino	(Sweden) Sara Hector	(Slovakia) Petra Vlhová	
1743	9	11 December 2022	(Italy) Sestriere (Pista Gianni A. Agnelli)	SL _{491}	(Switzerland) Wendy Holdener	(United States) Mikaela Shiffrin	(Slovakia) Petra Vlhová	
1744	10	16 December 2022	(Switzerland) St. Moritz (Corviglia 61%)	DH _{436}	(Italy) Elena Curtoni	(Italy) Sofia Goggia	(Switzerland) Corinne Suter	
1745	11	17 December 2022	(Switzerland) St. Moritz (Corviglia 61%)	DH _{437}	(Italy) Sofia Goggia	(Slovenia) Ilka Štuhec	(Germany) Kira Weidle	
1746	12	18 December 2022	(Switzerland) St. Moritz (Corviglia 61%)	SG _{255}	(United States) Mikaela Shiffrin	(Italy) Elena Curtoni	(France) Romane Miradoli	
1747	13	(Note: Women's cancelled giant slalom from Sölden was rescheduled to Semmering on 27 December 2022.)27 December 2022	(Austria) Semmering (Panorama 51%)	GS _{438}	(United States) Mikaela Shiffrin	(Slovakia) Petra Vlhová	(Italy) Marta Bassino	
1748	14	28 December 2022	(Austria) Semmering (Panorama 51%)	GS _{439}	(United States) Mikaela Shiffrin	(Switzerland) Lara Gut-Behrami	(Italy) Marta Bassino	
1749	15	29 December 2022	(Austria) Semmering (Panorama 51%)	SL _{492}	(United States) Mikaela Shiffrin	(United States) Paula Moltzan	(Germany) Lena Dürr	
1750	16	4 January 2023	(Croatia) Zagreb (Crveni spust 51%)	SL _{493}	(United States) Mikaela Shiffrin	(Slovakia) Petra Vlhová	(Sweden) Anna Swenn-Larsson	
		5 January 2023	(Croatia) Zagreb (Crveni spust 51%)	SL _{cnx}	cancelled due to bad weather (moved to Špindlerův Mlýn on 28 January)			
1751	17	7 January 2023	(Slovenia) Kranjska Gora (Podkoren 3 59%)	GS _{440}	(Canada) Valérie Grenier	(Italy) Marta Bassino	(Slovakia) Petra Vlhová	
1752	18	8 January 2023	(Slovenia) Kranjska Gora (Podkoren 3 59%)	GS _{441}	(United States) Mikaela Shiffrin	(Italy) Federica Brignone	(Switzerland) Lara Gut-Behrami	
1753	19	10 January 2023	(Austria) Flachau (Griessenkar 53%)	SL _{494}	(Slovakia) Petra Vlhová	(United States) Mikaela Shiffrin	(Germany) Lena Dürr	
		14 January 2023	(Austria) St. Anton (Karl-Schranz-Piste 78%)	DH _{cnx}	replaced with Super-G due to program changes			
1754	20	(Note: Women's canceled downhill from St. Anton was replaced with a Super-G on the same day.)14 January 2023	(Austria) St. Anton (Karl-Schranz-Piste 78%)	SG _{256}	(Italy) Federica Brignone	(Switzerland) Joana Hählen	(Switzerland) Lara Gut-Behrami	
1755	21	15 January 2023	(Austria) St. Anton (Karl-Schranz-Piste 78%)	SG _{257}	(Switzerland) Lara Gut-Behrami	(Italy) Federica Brignone	(Italy) Marta Bassino	
1756	22	20 January 2023	(Italy) Cortina d'Ampezzo (Olimpia delle Tofane 73%)	DH _{438}	(Italy) Sofia Goggia	(Slovenia) Ilka Štuhec	(Germany) Kira Weidle	
1757	23	21 January 2023	(Italy) Cortina d'Ampezzo (Olimpia delle Tofane 73%)	DH _{439}	(Slovenia) Ilka Štuhec	(Norway) Kajsa Vickhoff Lie	(Italy) Elena Curtoni	
1758	24	22 January 2023	(Italy) Cortina d'Ampezzo (Olimpia delle Tofane 73%)	SG _{258}	(Norway) Ragnhild Mowinckel	(Austria) Cornelia Hütter	(Italy) Marta Bassino	
1759	25	24 January 2023	(Italy) Kronplatz (Erta 61%)	GS _{442}	(United States) Mikaela Shiffrin	(Switzerland) Lara Gut-Behrami	(Italy) Federica Brignone	
1760	26	(Note: Women's giant slalom from Špindlerův Mlýn was moved to Kronplatz on 25 January 2023.)25 January 2023	(Italy) Kronplatz (Erta 61%)	GS _{443}	(United States) Mikaela Shiffrin	(Norway) Ragnhild Mowinckel	(Sweden) Sara Hector	
		28 January 2023	(Czech Republic) Špindlerův Mlýn (Černá Svatý Petr)	GS _{cnx}	cancelled and moved to Kronplatz on 25 January			
1761	27	(Note: Women's canceled slalom from Zagreb was rescheduled to Špindlerův Mlýn on 28 January 2023.)28 January 2023	(Czech Republic) Špindlerův Mlýn (Černá Svatý Petr)	SL _{495}	(United States) Mikaela Shiffrin	(Germany) Lena Dürr	(Switzerland) Wendy Holdener	
1762	28	29 January 2023	(Czech Republic) Špindlerův Mlýn (Černá Svatý Petr)	SL _{496}	(Germany) Lena Dürr	(United States) Mikaela Shiffrin	(Croatia) Zrinka Ljutić	
FIS Alpine World Ski Championships 2023 (6 – 18 February • Méribel, France)
		25 February 2023	(Switzerland) Crans-Montana (Mont Lachaux)	DH _{cnx}	cancelled due to bad weather and moved to 26 February			
1763	29	26 February 2023	(Switzerland) Crans-Montana (Mont Lachaux)	DH _{440}	(Italy) Sofia Goggia	(Italy) Federica Brignone	(France) Laura Gauché	
		26 February 2023	(Switzerland) Crans-Montana (Mont Lachaux)	SG _{cnx}	cancelled due to program changes			
1764	30	3 March 2023	(Norway) Kvitfjell (Olympiabakken)	SG _{259}	(Austria) Cornelia Hütter	(Italy) Elena Curtoni	(Switzerland) Lara Gut-Behrami	
1765	31	4 March 2023	(Norway) Kvitfjell (Olympiabakken)	DH _{441}	(Norway) Kajsa Vickhoff Lie	(Italy) Sofia Goggia	(Switzerland) Corinne Suter	
1766	32	5 March 2023	(Norway) Kvitfjell (Olympiabakken)	SG _{260}	(Austria) Nina Ortlieb	(Austria) Stephanie Venier	(Austria) Franziska Gritsch	
1767	33	10 March 2023	(Sweden) Åre (Störtloppsbacken)	GS _{444}	(United States) Mikaela Shiffrin	(Italy) Federica Brignone	(Sweden) Sara Hector	
1768	34	11 March 2023	(Sweden) Åre (Störtloppsbacken)	SL _{497}	(United States) Mikaela Shiffrin	(Switzerland) Wendy Holdener	(Sweden) Anna Swenn-Larsson	
FIS World Cup Season Final
1769	35	15 March 2023	(Andorra) Soldeu (Àliga)	DH _{442}	(Slovenia) Ilka Štuhec	(Italy) Sofia Goggia	(Switzerland) Lara Gut-Behrami	
1770	36	16 March 2023	(Andorra) Soldeu (Àliga)	SG _{261}	(Switzerland) Lara Gut-Behrami	(Italy) Federica Brignone	(Norway) Ragnhild Mowinckel	
1771	37	18 March 2023	(Andorra) Soldeu (Avet)	SL _{498}	(Slovakia) Petra Vlhová	(Croatia) Leona Popović	(United States) Mikaela Shiffrin	
1772	38	19 March 2023	(Andorra) Soldeu (Avet)	GS _{445}	(United States) Mikaela Shiffrin	(Norway) Thea Louise Stjernesund	(Canada) Valérie Grenier	

=== Rankings ===
==== Overall ====
Rank	after all 38 races	Points
	(United States) Mikaela Shiffrin	2206
2	(Switzerland) Lara Gut-Behrami	1217
3	(Slovakia) Petra Vlhová	1125
4	(Italy) Federica Brignone	1069
5	(Italy) Sofia Goggia	916

==== Downhill ====
Rank	after all 9 races	Points
	(Italy) Sofia Goggia	740
2	(Slovenia) Ilka Štuhec	551
3	(Switzerland) Corinne Suter	309
4	(Italy) Elena Curtoni	308
5	(Austria) Mirjam Puchner	273

==== Super-G ====
Rank	after all 8 races	Points
	(Switzerland) Lara Gut-Behrami	413
2	(Italy) Federica Brignone	368
3	(Norway) Ragnhild Mowinckel	366
4	(Italy) Elena Curtoni	358
5	(Austria) Cornelia Hütter	347

==== Giant slalom ====
Rank	after all 10 races	Points
	(United States) Mikaela Shiffrin	800
2	(Switzerland) Lara Gut-Behrami	532
3	(Italy) Marta Bassino	515
4	(Slovakia) Petra Vlhová	486
5	(Italy) Federica Brignone	476

==== Slalom ====
Rank	after all 11 races	Points
	(United States) Mikaela Shiffrin	945
2	(Switzerland) Wendy Holdener	655
3	(Slovakia) Petra Vlhová	630
4	(Germany) Lena Dürr	493
5	(Sweden) Anna Swenn-Larsson	470

== Alpine team event ==
World Cup history in real time

Total	SL + SG	PG	Winners
16	3	13	6

after PG in Soldeu (18 March 2022)

=== Calendar ===
Event key: PG – Parallel giant slalom
All	#	Date	Venue (slope %)	Type	Winner	Second	Third	Ref.
World Cup Season Final
17	1	17 March 2023	(Andorra) Soldeu (Aliga)	PG _{014}	Norway Timon Haugan; Thea Louise Stjernesund; Maria Therese Tviberg; Rasmus Windingstad	Switzerland Semyel Bissig; Andrea Ellenberger; Stefanie Grob*; Camille Rast; Livio Simonet; Thomas Tumler*	Austria Patrick Feurstein*; Franziska Gritsch; Fabio Gstrein; Adrian Pertl; Julia Scheib; Katharina Truppe*	

*Reserve Skiers

== Nations Cup ==
Overall

Rank	after all 77 races	Points
1	Switzerland	11318
2	Austria	8729
3	Norway	7611
4	Italy	6723
5	United States	4389

Men

Rank	after all 39 races	Points
1	Switzerland	6298
2	Norway	5272
3	Austria	4756
4	Italy	2535
5	France	2415

Women

Rank	after all 39 races	Points
1	Switzerland	5020
2	Italy	4188
3	Austria	3973
4	United States	3264
5	Norway	2339

== Prize money ==
Top-5 men

Rank	after all 38 races	CHF
1	(Switzerland) Marco Odermatt	941 200
2	(Norway) Aleksander Aamodt Kilde	623 182
3	(Norway) Henrik Kristoffersen	372 680
4	(Austria) Vincent Kriechmayr	354 410
5	(Norway) Lucas Braathen	264 800

Top-5 women

Rank	after all 38 races	CHF
1	(United States) Mikaela Shiffrin	964 200
2	(Italy) Sofia Goggia	338 000
3	(Italy) Federica Brignone	317 575
4	(Switzerland) Lara Gut-Behrami	314 230
5	(Slovakia) Petra Vlhová	288 920

== Podium table by nation ==
Table showing the World Cup podium places (gold–1st place, silver–2nd place, bronze–3rd place) by the countries represented by the athletes.

Rank	Nation	Gold	Silver	Bronze	Total
1	Switzerland	24	16	17	57
2	Norway	17	14	12	43
3	United States	14	4	2	20
4	Italy	8	14	9	31
5	Austria	7	10	9	26
6	Slovenia	2	3	2	7
7	Slovakia	2	2	5	9
8	Germany	1	3	7	11
9	France	1	3	6	10
10	Sweden	1	2	5	8
11	Canada	1	2	2	5
12	Croatia	0	1	1	2
13	Great Britain	0	1	0	1
13	Greece	0	1	0	1
15	Bulgaria	0	0	1	1
Totals (15 entries)		78	76	78	232

== Achievements ==
First World Cup career victory

Men

- (Norway) Alexander Steen Olsen (21), in his 3rd season – Slalom in Palisades Tahoe

Women

- (Canada) Valérie Grenier (26), in her 8th season – Giant slalom in Kranjska Gora
- (Sweden) Anna Swenn-Larsson (31), in her 12th season – Slalom in Killington
- (Norway) Kajsa Vickhoff Lie (24), in her 6th season – Downhill in Kvitfjell

First World Cup podium

Men

- (Norway) Alexander Steen Olsen (21), in his 3rd season – Slalom in Palisades Tahoe – 1st place
- (Switzerland) Stefan Rogentin (28), in his 7th season – Super-G in Wengen – 2nd place
- (Italy) Florian Schieder (27), in his 6th season – Downhill in Kitzbühel – 2nd place
- (Greece) AJ Ginnis (28), in his 7th season – Slalom in Chamonix – 2nd place
- (Germany) Andreas Sander (33), in his 15th season – Super-G in Aspen – 2nd place
- (Italy) Mattia Casse (32), in his 13th season – Downhill in Val Gardena/Gröden – 3rd place
- (Bulgaria) Albert Popov (25), in his 9th season – Slalom in Palisades Tahoe – 3rd place

Women

- (Canada) Valérie Grenier (26), in her 8th season – Giant slalom in Kranjska Gora – 1st place
- (Croatia) Leona Popović (25), in her 8th season – Slalom in Soldeu – 2nd place
- (France) Laura Gauché (27), in her 10th season – Downhill in Crans Montana – 3rd place
- (Croatia) Zrinka Ljutić (19), in her 3rd season – Slalom in Špindlerův Mlýn – 3rd place

Number of wins this season (in brackets are all-time wins)

Men

- (Switzerland) Marco Odermatt – 13 (24)
- (Norway) Aleksander Aamodt Kilde – 8 (21)
- (Austria) Vincent Kriechmayr – 4 (16)
- (Norway) Lucas Braathen – 3 (5)
- (Norway) Henrik Kristoffersen – 2 (30)
- (Switzerland) Daniel Yule – 2 (6)
- (Switzerland) Ramon Zenhäusern – 2 (6)
- (France) Clément Noël – 1 (10)
- (Austria) Marco Schwarz – 1 (5)
- (Switzerland) Loïc Meillard – 1 (2)
- (Norway) Alexander Steen Olsen – 1 (1)

Women

- (United States) Mikaela Shiffrin – 14 (88) (Note: All-time record in World Cup history (after this season)
- (Italy) Sofia Goggia – 5 (22)
- (Switzerland) Lara Gut-Behrami – 3 (37)
- (Slovakia) Petra Vlhová – 2 (28)
- (Slovenia) Ilka Štuhec – 2 (11)
- (Switzerland) Wendy Holdener – 2 (5)
- (Italy) Federica Brignone – 1 (21)
- (Italy) Marta Bassino – 1 (6)
- (Switzerland) Corinne Suter – 1 (5)
- (Austria) Cornelia Hütter – 1 (4)
- (Italy) Elena Curtoni – 1 (3)
- (Norway) Ragnhild Mowinckel – 1 (3)
- (Germany) Lena Dürr – 1 (2)
- (Austria) Nina Ortlieb – 1 (2)
- (Canada) Valérie Grenier – 1 (1)
- (Sweden) Anna Swenn-Larsson – 1 (1)
- (Norway) Kajsa Vickhoff Lie – 1 (1)

== Retirements ==
The following athletes announced their retirements during or after the season:

Men

- (Norway) Lucas Braathen (announced comeback in season 2024-25 for Brazil)
- (Switzerland) Mauro Caviezel
- (France) Johan Clarey
- (Austria) Marc Digruber
- (Austria) Thomas Dorner
- (Switzerland) Beat Feuz
- (United States) Travis Ganong
- (Liechtenstein) Ian Gut
- (Germany) David Ketterer
- (Austria) Maximilian Lahnsteiner
- (Italy) Matteo Marsaglia
- (Austria) Matthias Mayer
- (Norway) Leif Kristian Nestvold-Haugen
- (United States) Steven Nyman
- (Canada) Trevor Philp
- (Germany) Julian Rauchfuß
- (France) Brice Roger
- (Germany) Manuel Schmid
- (France) Victor Schuller
- (Italy) Riccardo Tonetti
- (Finland) Samu Torsti
- (Norway) Fabian Wilkens Solheim

Women

- (Germany) Leonie Flötgen
- (France) Coralie Frasse Sombet
- (Canada) Marie-Michèle Gagnon
- (Switzerland) Nathalie Gröbli
- (Finland) Riikka Honkanen
- (Slovenia) Meta Hrovat
- (France) Kenza Lacheb
- (Sweden) Jonna Luthman
- (Switzerland) Valentine Macheret
- (France) Nastasia Noens
- (Romania) Andreea Oprescu
- (France) Esther Paslier
- (Slovenia) Tina Robnik
- (Austria) Nicole Schmidhofer
- (Germany) Marlene Schmotz
- (Austria) Ramona Siebenhofer
- (United Kingdom) Alexandra Tilley
- (France) Tessa Worley

== See also ==
- 2022–23 FIS Alpine Ski Continental Cup
- 2022–23 FIS Alpine Ski Europa Cup
- 2022–23 FIS Alpine Ski Nor-Am Cup
- 2022 FIS Alpine Ski South American Cup
- 2022–23 FIS Alpine Ski Australia-New Zealand Cup
