= Brazil at the 2026 Winter Olympics =

- Flag of Brazil
- IOC code: BRA
- NOC: Brazilian Olympic Committee
- Website: www.cob.org.br (in Portuguese)

in Milan and Cortina d'Ampezzo, Italy 6 February 2026 – 22 February 2026
- Competitors: 14 (10 men and 4 women) in 5 sports
- Flag bearers (opening): Lucas Pinheiro Braathen & Nicole Silveira
- Flag bearer (closing): Edson Bindilatti
- Medals Ranked 19th: Gold 1 Silver 0 Bronze 0 Total 1

Winter Olympics appearances (overview)
- 1992; 1994; 1998; 2002; 2006; 2010; 2014; 2018; 2022; 2026

Brazil competed at the 2026 Winter Olympics in Milan and Cortina d'Ampezzo, Italy, from 6 to 22 February 2026.

Alpine skier Lucas Pinheiro Braathen and skeleton racer Nicole Silveira were the country's opening ceremony flagbearers. Bobsleder Edson Bindilatti was the flagbearer during the closing ceremony.

On 14 February 2026, Braathen became the first Latin American and Brazilian as well as the first athlete from any tropical nation to win a medal in the Winter Olympics with a gold in the Men's giant slalom.

== Competitors ==
The following is the list of number of competitors participating at the Games per sport/discipline.

Sport	Men	Women	Total
Alpine skiing	3	1	4
Bobsleigh	4	0	4
Cross-country skiing	1	2	3
Skeleton	0	1	1
Snowboarding	2	0	2
Total	10	4	14

== Medalist ==
Medal	Name	Sport	Event	Date
Gold	Lucas Pinheiro Braathen	Alpine skiing	Men's giant slalom	14 February

On 14 February 2026, Lucas Pinheiro Braathen competed at the Milano Cortina 2026 Olympic Games, having entered the event ranked second in the slalom, giant slalom, and overall standings following the 2025–26 FIS Alpine Ski World Cup season, behind Switzerland’s Marco Odermatt.

In the giant slalom, Braathen recorded the fastest time in the first run (1:13.92), nearly one second ahead of Odermatt, who placed second. He maintained his lead in the second run, finishing with a combined time of 2:25.00 to win the gold medal. Odermatt secured the silver medal with a total time of 2:25.58, while Switzerland’s Loïc Meillard finished third in 2:26.17 to take the bronze.

== Alpine skiing ==
Brazil qualified one female and one male alpine skier through the basic quota.

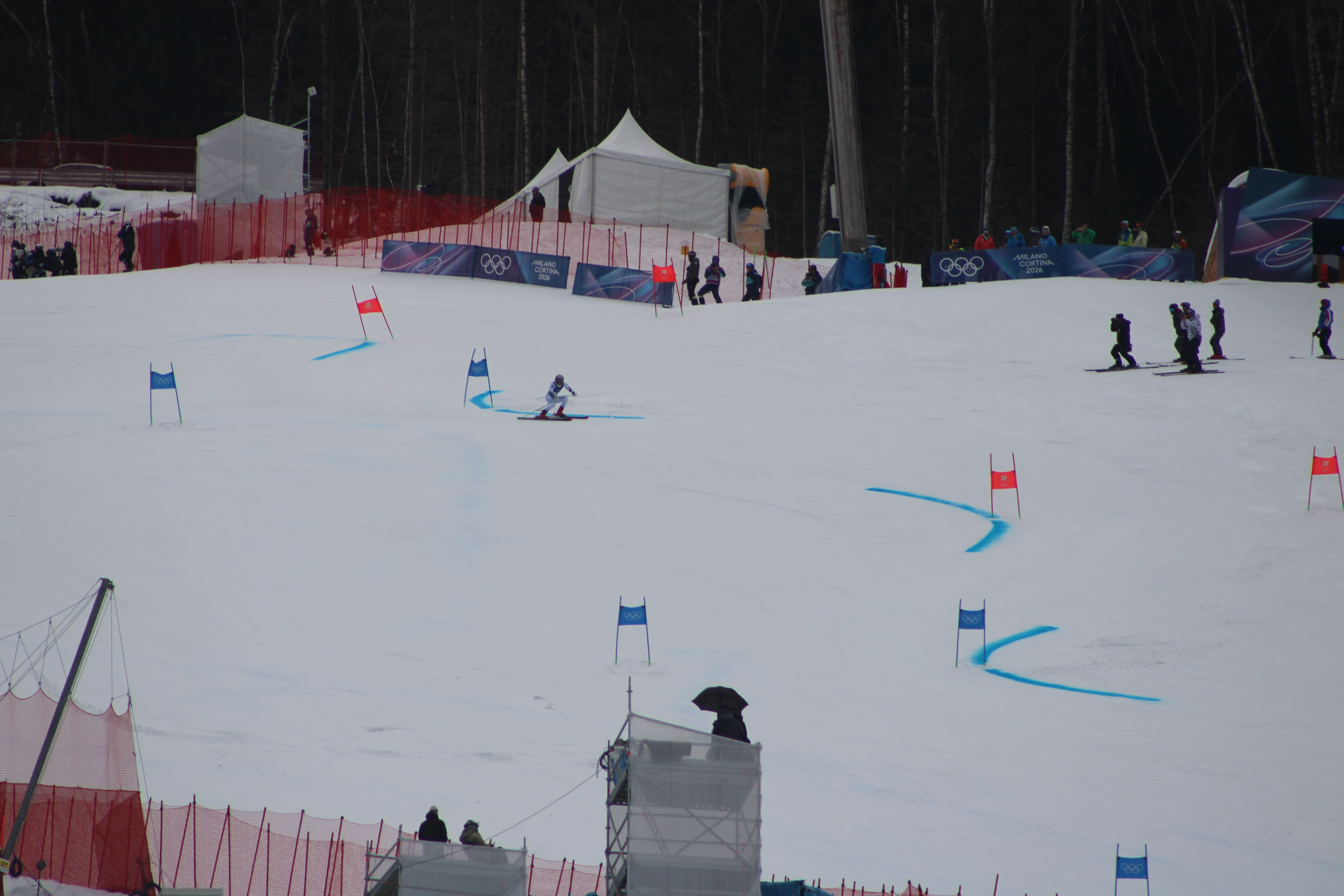
Pinheiro Braathen at the men's giant slalom event.

Athlete	Event	Run 1		Run 2		Total	
Athlete	Event	Time	Rank	Time	Rank	Time	Rank
Giovanni Ongaro	Men's slalom	1:04.66	31	1.02.21	26	2:06.87	27
Giovanni Ongaro	Men's giant slalom	1:19.95	35	1:14.20	31	2:34.15	31
Lucas Pinheiro Braathen	Men's giant slalom	1:13.92	1	1:11.08	11	2:25.00	1st place, gold medalist(s)
Lucas Pinheiro Braathen	Men's slalom	DNF					
Christian Oliveira Søvik	Men's slalom	DNF					
Alice Padilha	Women's slalom	DNF					

== Bobsleigh ==
Brazil secured one sled in two-man and four-man event through the world cup races and rankings. In total, Brazil qualified four male bobsledders at the Games.

Athlete	Event	Run 1		Run 2		Run 3		Run 4		Total	
Athlete	Event	Time	Rank	Time	Rank	Time	Rank	Time	Rank	Time	Rank
Edson Bindilatti*; Luis Bacca Gonçalves	Two-man	56.95	24	56.81	24	56.22	22	Did not advance		2:49.98	24
Edson Bindilatti*; Luis Bacca Gonçalves; Davidson Henrique de Souza; Rafael Souza da Silva	Four-man	55.04	15	55.42	20	55.38	19	55.30	20	3:41.19	19

== Cross-country skiing ==
Brazil qualified one female and one male cross-country skier through the basic quota. Following the completion of the 2024–25 FIS Cross-Country World Cup, Brazil qualified an additional one female athlete.

Distance

Athlete	Event	Final		
Athlete	Event	Time	Deficit	Rank
Manex Silva	Men's 10 km freestyle	26:51.4	+6:15.2	97
Bruna Moura	Women's 10 km freestyle	30:56.7	+8:07.7	99
Eduarda Ribera	Women's 10 km freestyle	DNF		

Sprint

Athlete	Event	Qualification		Quarterfinal		Semifinal		Final	
Athlete	Event	Time	Rank	Time	Rank	Time	Rank	Time	Rank
Manex Silva	Men's sprint	3:25.48	48	Did not advance					
Bruna Moura	Women's sprint	4:22.07	74	Did not advance					
Eduarda Ribera	Women's sprint	4:17.05	72	Did not advance					
Bruna Moura; Eduarda Ribera	Women's team sprint	7:37.26	21	Did not advance					

== Skeleton ==
Brazil qualified one female skeleton racer through on the world rankings.

Athlete	Event	Run 1		Run 2		Run 3		Run 4		Total	
Athlete	Event	Time	Rank	Time	Rank	Time	Rank	Time	Rank	Time	Rank
Nicole Silveira	Women's	57.93	13	57.85	10	58.11	12	57.93	10	3:51.82	11

== Snowboarding ==
Park & Pipe

Athlete	Event	Qualification				Final				
Athlete	Event	Run 1	Run 2	Best	Rank	Run 1	Run 2	Run 3	Best	Rank
Patrick Burgener	Men's halfpipe	70.00	DNI	70.00	14	Did not advance				
Augustinho Teixeira	Men's halfpipe	56.50	DNI	56.50	19	Did not advance				

== See also ==
- Brazil at the 2026 Winter Paralympics
