= Giovanni Ongaro =

Brazilian alpine skier (born 2004)

Personal information
- Born: 3 February 2004 (age 22) Clusone, Italy

Skiing career
- Country: Brazil (since 2024); Italy (2020–2024)
- Sport: Alpine skiing
- Club: VAL Palot SKI S.S.D. A R.L.
- Disciplines: Slalom, giant slalom

Olympics
- Teams: 1 – (2026)
- Medals: 0

World Championships
- Teams: 1 – (2025)
- Medals: 0

Giovanni Ongaro (born February 3, 2004) is an Italian-Brazilian alpine skier. He was born in Clusone, Italy, son of a Brazilian mother and Italian father. Until the end of the 2023–24 season, he competed for the Italian Ski Federation, primarily in junior and FIS races in Italy.

At the start of the 2024–25 season, Ongaro switched to the Brazilian Ski Federation. He competed in his first race for Brazil on 16 November 2024, in Kåbdalis, Sweden. Later that season, Ongaro participated in his first Alpine World Ski Championships. At the competition in Saalbach, Austria, he finished 44th in the giant slalom.

Representing Brazil at the 2026 Winter Olympics he competed in the men's giant slalom, finishing in 31st place, an event where the fellow Brazilian Lucas Pinheiro Braathen won gold medal. His best result at Milano Cortina 2026 was the 27th place in slalom.

== World Championship results ==
Year
Year	Age	Slalom	Giant slalom	Super-G	Downhill	Team combined	Team event
2025	21	DSQ	44	—	—	—	—

== Olympic results ==
Year
Year	Age	Slalom	Giant slalom	Super-G	Downhill	Team combined
2026	22	27	31	—	—	—
