= World Junior Alpine Skiing Championships 2018 =

International skiing competition

The World Junior Alpine Skiing Championships 2018 were the 37th World Junior Alpine Skiing Championships, held between 30 January and 8 February 2018 in Davos, Switzerland.

== Schedule ==
Eleven events will be held.

Date	Time	Events
30 January	09:00	Ladies giant slalom first run
30 January	13:00	Ladies giant slalom second run
31 January	09:00	Ladies slalom first run
31 January	10:30	Men downhill first run
31 January	12:15	Ladies slalom second run
31 January	13:30	Men downhill second run
2 February
2 February	10:00	Men Super-G
3 February
3 February	17:00	Team Event
4 February	09:00	Men combined - Slalom
4 February	10:30	Ladies Super-G
4 February	13:30	Men combined - Super-G
5 February	09:30	Ladies combined - Slalom
5 February	12:30	Ladies combined - Super-G
6 February	09:15	Men giant slalom first run
6 February	13:15	Men giant slalom second run
7 February	09:15	Men slalom first run
7 February	13:15	Men slalom second run
8 February
8 February	11:30	Ladies downhill

== Medal winners ==
=== Men's events ===
Event	Gold		Silver		Bronze	
Downhill	Marco Odermatt; Switzerland	2:20.18	Sam Mulligan; Canada	2:20.20	Lars Rösti; Switzerland	2:20.21
Super-G	Marco Odermatt; Switzerland	1:07.59	River Radamus; United States	1:08.47	Luke Winters; United States	1:08.50
Giant Slalom	Marco Odermatt; Switzerland	1:39.47	Fabio Gstrein; Austria	1:40.44	Albert Popov; Bulgaria	1:40.79
Slalom	Clément Noël; France	1:45.31	Alex Vinatzer; Italy	1:48.08	Joachim Jagge Lindstøl; Norway	1:48.49
Combined	Marco Odermatt; Switzerland	2:01.77	Semyel Bissig; Switzerland	2:02.02	Raphael Haaser; Austria	2:02.67

=== Ladies events ===
Event	Gold		Silver		Bronze	
Downhill	Kajsa Vickhoff Lie; Norway	1:10.10	Juliana Suter; Switzerland	1:10.38	Yuliya Pleshkova; Russia	1:10.65
Super-G	Kajsa Vickhoff Lie; Norway	1:12.22	Franziska Gritsch; Austria	1:12.27	Stephanie Jenal; Switzerland	1:12.85
Giant Slalom	Julia Scheib; Austria	1:39.66	Katharina Liensberger; Austria	1:39.79	Riikka Honkanen; Finland	1:40.60
Slalom	Meta Hrovat; Slovenia	1:46.51	Franziska Gritsch; Austria	1:47.23	Aline Danioth; Switzerland	1:47.76
Combined	Aline Danioth; Switzerland	2:03.41	Meta Hrovat; Slovenia	2:03.97	Franziska Gritsch; Austria	2:04.57

=== Team event ===
Event	Gold	Silver	Bronze
Team event	Switzerland; Camille Rast; Marco Odermatt; Aline Danioth; Semyel Bissig	Norway; Kajsa Vickhoff Lie; Lucas Braathen; Kaja Norbye; Joachim Jagge Lindstøl	Austria; Julia Scheib; Simon Rueland; Franziska Gritsch; Fabio Gstrein

=== Medal table ===
Rank	Nation	Gold	Silver	Bronze	Total
1	Switzerland (SUI)	6	2	3	11
2	Norway (NOR)	2	1	1	4
3	Austria (AUT)	1	4	3	8
4	Slovenia (SLO)	1	1	0	2
5	France (FRA)	1	0	0	1
6	United States (USA)	0	1	1	2
7	Canada (CAN)	0	1	0	1
7	Italy (ITA)	0	1	0	1
9	Bulgaria (BUL)	0	0	1	1
9	Finland (FIN)	0	0	1	1
9	Russia (RUS)	0	0	1	1
Totals (11 entries)		11	11	11	33
