= Fabio Gstrein =

Austrian alpine skier (born 1997)

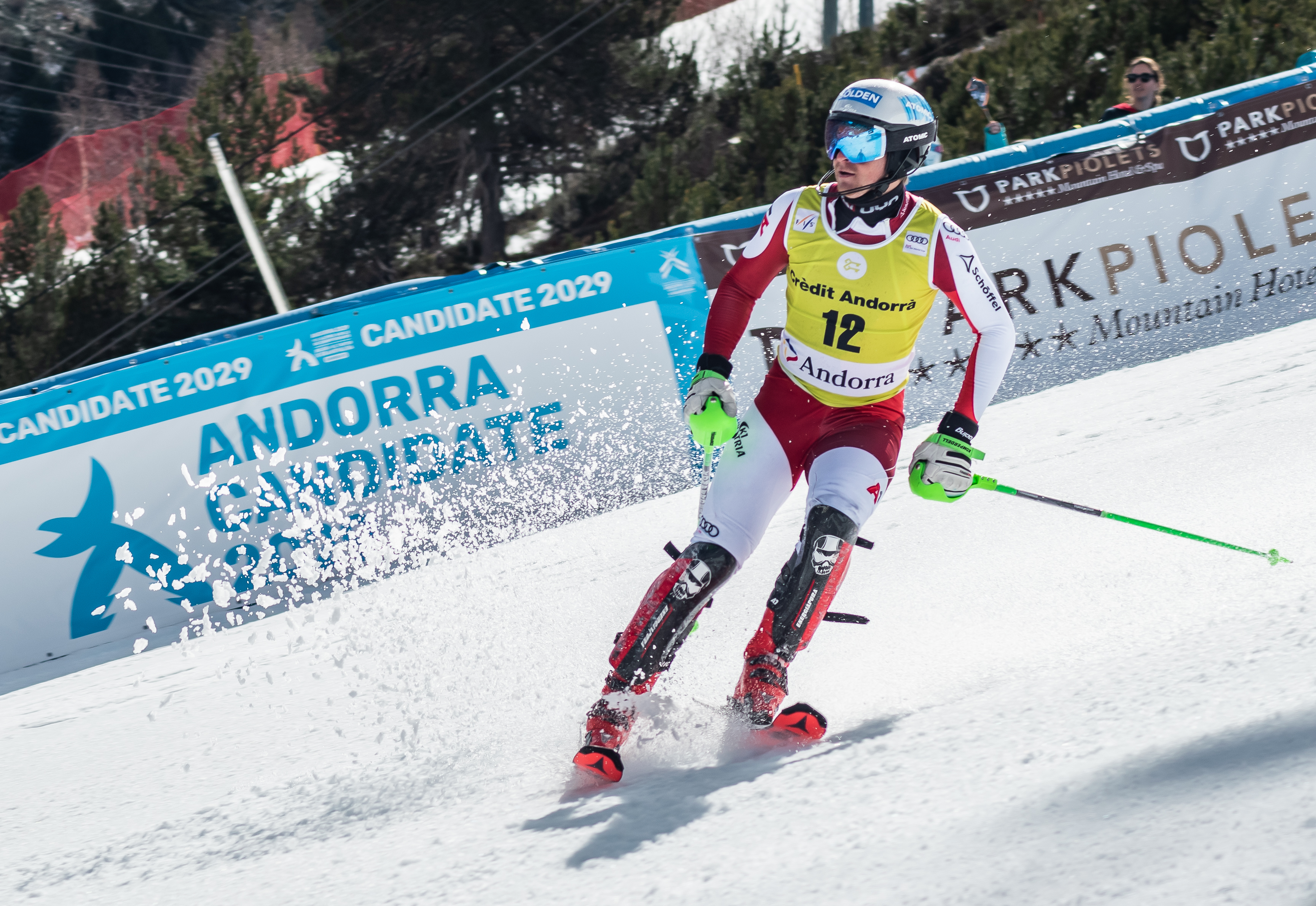
- At Soldeu in March 2023

Personal information
- Born: 14 June 1997 (age 29) Sölden, Tyrol, Austria

Skiing career
- Country: Austria
- Sport: Alpine skiing
- Disciplines: Slalom
- World Cup debut: 21 January 2018 (age 20)

Olympics
- Teams: 1 – (2026)
- Medals: 1 (0 gold)

World Championships
- Teams: 3 – (2021–2025)
- Medals: 0

World Cup
- Seasons: 9 – (2018–2026)
- Wins: 0
- Podiums: 2 – (2 SL)
- Overall titles: 0 – (20th in 2025)
- Discipline titles: 0 – (7th in SL, 2025)
Medal record
Men's alpine skiing
Representing Austria
Olympic Games
Silver medal – second place	2026 Milano Cortina	Slalom
Junior World Championships
Silver medal – second place	2017 Åre	Team event
Silver medal – second place	2018 Davos	Giant slalom
Bronze medal – third place	2018 Davos	Team event

Fabio Gstrein (born 14 June 1997) is an Austrian Olympic and World Cup alpine ski racer and specializes in slalom. He won a silver medal in slalom at the 2026 Milan Cortina Olympics.

== Biography ==
Gstrein won a silver medal in slalom at the 2018 Junior World Championships, held in Davos, Switzerland, and has represented Austria at two World Championships.

He is a distant relative of Bernhard Gstrein (b.1965), a former World Cup alpine racer.

== World Cup results ==
=== Season standings ===
Season
Season	Age	Overall	Slalom	Giant slalom	Super-G	Downhill	Combined	Parallel
2020	22	60	21	—	—	—	—	17
2021	23	49	17	—	—	—	—N/a	19
2022	24	70	26	—	—	—	—N/a	—
2023	25	43	14	—	—	—	—N/a	—N/a
2024	26	44	12	—	—	—	—N/a	—N/a
2025	27	20	7	—	—	—	—N/a	—N/a
2026	28	36	14	—	—	—	—N/a	—N/a

=== Top-five results ===
- 0 wins
- 2 podiums (2 SL), 6 top fives (6 SL), 26 top tens

Season
Season	Date	Location	Discipline	Place
2025	29 January 2025	Schladming, Austria	Slalom	3rd
2025	27 March 2025	Sun Valley, United States	Slalom	3rd

== World Championship results ==
Year
Year	Age	Slalom	Giant slalom	Super-G	Downhill	Combined	Team combined	Parallel	Team event
2021	23	—	—	—	—	—	—N/a	6	5
2023	25	16	—	—	—	—	—N/a	—	—
2025	27	11	—	—	—	—N/a	5	—N/a	—

== Olympic results ==
Year
Year	Age	Slalom	Giant slalom	Super-G	Downhill	Team combined
2026	28	2	—	—	—	8
