= World Junior Alpine Skiing Championships 2019 =

International skiing competition

The World Junior Alpine Skiing Championships 2019 were the 38th World Junior Alpine Skiing Championships, held between 18 and 27 February 2019 in Val di Fassa, Trentino, Italy.

Race courses took place at the Aloch Ski Stadium in Pozza di Fassa (Sèn Jan di Fassa) and at La VolatA slope on Passo San Pellegrino (Moena).

== Schedule ==
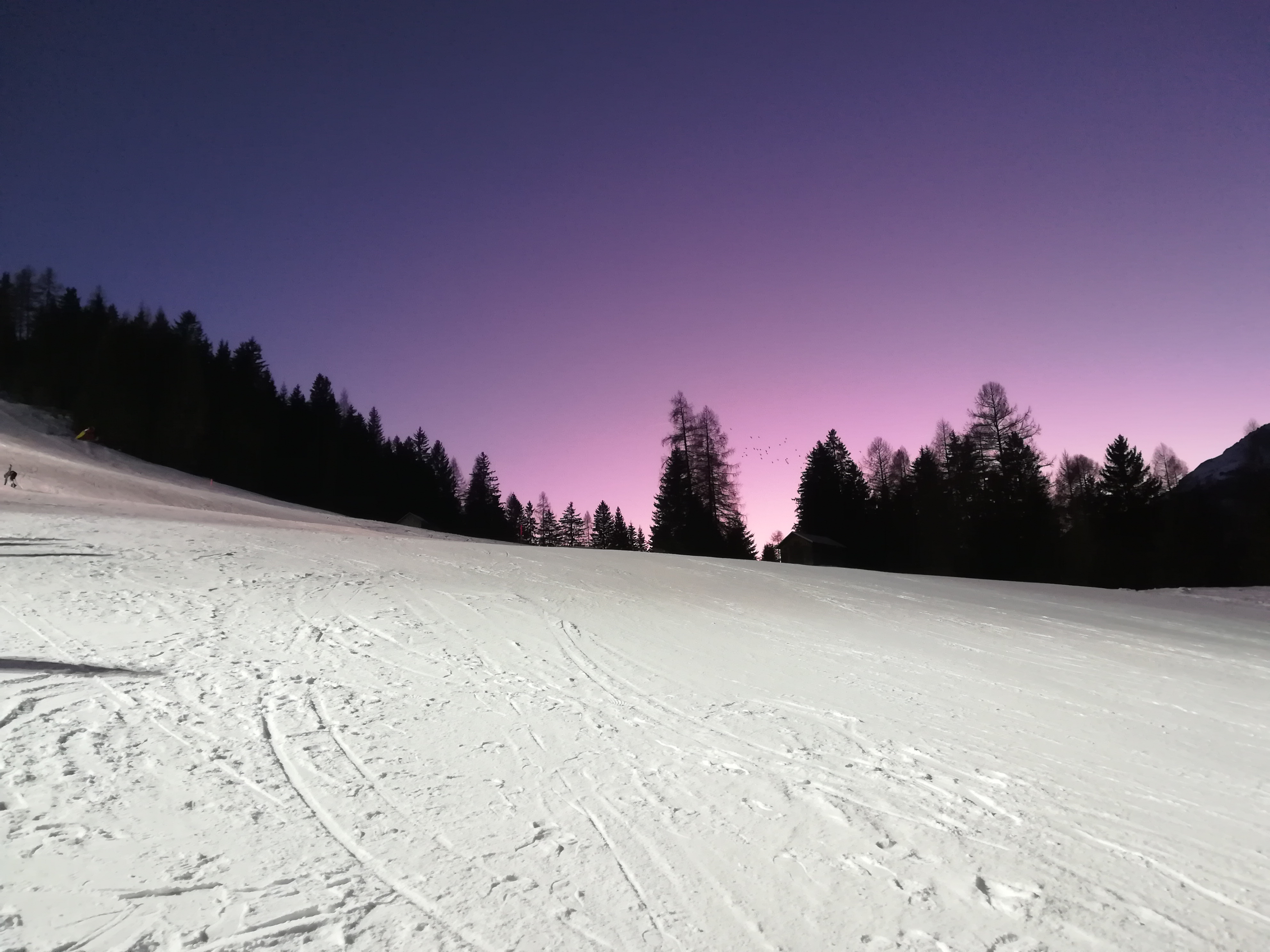
Sunset photographed from skistadium Aloch in Pozza di Fassa (Italy)

Eleven events will be held.

Date	Time	Events
19 February	09:30	Ladies giant slalom first run
19 February	13:00	Ladies giant slalom second run
20 February	09:30	Ladies slalom first run
20 February	11:00	Men downhill
20 February	12:30	Ladies slalom second run
21 February
21 February	11:00	Men Super-G
22 February
22 February	18:00	Team Event
23 February	11:00	Men combined – Super-G
23 February	15:00	Men combined – Slalom
24 February
24 February	10:30	Ladies combined – Super-G
24 February	14:30	Ladies combined – Slalom
25 February	09:30	Men giant slalom first run
25 February	13:30	Men giant slalom second run
26 February	09:30	Men slalom first run
26 February	13:30	Men slalom second run
27 February
27 February	10:30	Ladies downhill

== Medal winners ==
=== Men's events ===
Event	Gold		Silver		Bronze	
Downhill	Lars Rösti; Switzerland	1:20.21	Julian Schütter; Austria	1:20.33	Manuel Traninger; Austria	1:20.66
Super-G	River Radamus; United States	1:09.29	Lucas Braathen; Norway	1:09.63	Florian Loriot; France	1:09.77
Giant Slalom	River Radamus; United States	1:57.96	Tobias Kastlunger; Italy	1:58.80	Sam Maes; Belgium	1:58.89
Slalom	Alex Vinatzer; Italy	1:46.52	Benjamin Ritchie; United States	1:47.90	Sam Maes; Belgium	1:47.98
Combined	Tobias Hedström; Sweden	2:04.03	Atle Lie McGrath; Norway	2:04.45	Lucas Braathen; Norway	2:04.48

=== Ladies events ===
Event	Gold		Silver		Bronze	
Downhill	Juliana Suter; Switzerland	1:23.91	Noémie Kolly; Switzerland	1:24.06	Lisa Grill; Austria	1:24.57
Super-G	Hannah Sæthereng; Norway	1:14.54	Julia Scheib; Austria	1:14.68	Lindy Etzensperger; Switzerland	1:14.74
Giant Slalom	Alice Robinson; New Zealand	1:54.99	Camille Rast; Switzerland	1:56.05	Kaja Norbye; Norway	1:56.15
Slalom	Meta Hrovat; Slovenia	1:47.70	Aline Danioth; Switzerland	1:48.59	Elsa Håkansson Fermbäck; Sweden	1:48.98
Combined	Nicole Good; Switzerland	2:03.77	Kaja Norbye; Norway	2:04.27	Ida Dannewitz; Sweden	2:04.28

=== Team event ===
Event	Gold	Silver	Bronze
Team event	France; Marie Lamure; Jérémie Lagier; Doriane Escané; Augustin Bianchini	United States; Katie Hensien; River Radamus; AJ Hurt; Benjamin Ritchie	Germany; Martina Willibald; Nikolaus Pföderl; Martina Ostler; Fabian Himmelsbach

=== Medal table ===
* Host nation (Italy)

Rank	Nation	Gold	Silver	Bronze	Total
1	Switzerland (SUI)	3	3	1	7
2	United States (USA)	2	2	0	4
3	Norway (NOR)	1	3	2	6
4	Italy (ITA)*	1	1	0	2
5	Sweden (SWE)	1	0	2	3
6	France (FRA)	1	0	1	2
7	New Zealand (NZL)	1	0	0	1
7	Slovenia (SLO)	1	0	0	1
9	Austria (AUT)	0	2	2	4
10	Belgium (BEL)	0	0	2	2
11	Germany (GER)	0	0	1	1
Totals (11 entries)		11	11	11	33
