= Alpine skiing at the 2026 Winter Olympics – Men's slalom =

Men's slalom at the XXV Olympic Winter Games
- Alpine skiing
- Venue: Stelvio, Bormio
- Date: 16 February 2026
- Competitors: 96 from 70 nations

Medalists
1st place, gold medalist(s)		Loïc Meillard	Switzerland
2nd place, silver medalist(s)		Fabio Gstrein	Austria
3rd place, bronze medalist(s)		Henrik Kristoffersen	Norway

Men's slalom
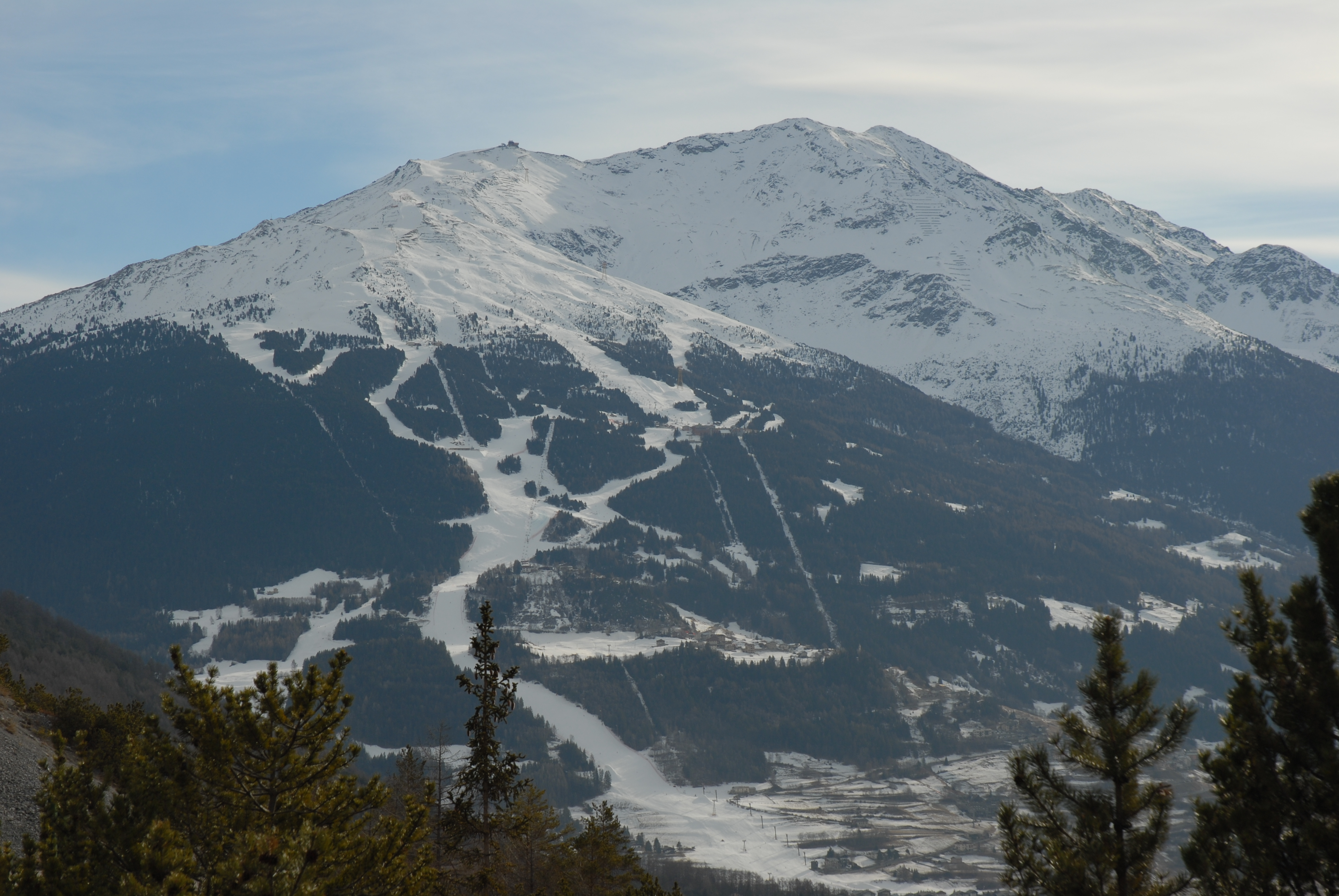
- Location: Stelvio Ski Centre
- Vertical: 203 m (666 ft)
- Top elevation: 1,432 m (4,698 ft) AMSL
- Base elevation: 1,229 m (4,032 ft)
- Longest run: 691 m (0.43 mi)

The men's slalom competition of the 2026 Winter Olympics was held on Monday, 16 February, at Stelvio Ski Centre in Bormio. Loïc Meillard of Switzerland won the event, and this became his first Olympic gold. Fabio Gstrein of Austria won the silver medal, his first Olympic medal, and Henrik Kristoffersen of Norway won bronze.

== Background ==
The defending champion, Clément Noël, qualified for the event. The silver medalist, Johannes Strolz, did not qualify. The bronze medalist, Sebastian Foss-Solevåg, retired from competitions. Prior to the Olympics on the World Cup circuit, Atle Lie McGrath led in the slalom standings, closely followed by Lucas Pinheiro Braathen. Loïc Meillard was the reigning world champion

== Summary ==
Atle Lie McGrath was the fastest in the first run, 0.6 seconds ahead of Loïc Meillard and almost a second faster than Gstrein and Timon Haugan. Kristoffersen, sixth in the first run, posted a leading time in the second run and led with three racers (from the leading group) remaining. The next two, Gstrein and Meillard, posted best identical times in the second run. With a better first run, Meillard was in the gold medal position with one racer remaining. Starting last in the leading group of thirty, McGrath straddled an early gate and did not finish.

The opening run was conducted under snowfall; more than half the field failed to finish the first run.

== Results ==
The race was started at 10:00 (first run) and 13:30 (second run) local time (UTC+1), both under soft snow conditions. The first run was held in light snow; the air temperature was −3.4 °C (26 °F) at the starting gate and −1.1 °C (30 °F) at the finish area. The second run was under mostly cloudy skies; the air temperature was −1.0 °C (30 °F) at the starting gate and 0.7 °C (33 °F) at the finish area.

Rank	Bib	Name	Nation	Run 1	Rank	Run 2	Rank	Total	Behind
1st place, gold medalist(s)	2	Loïc Meillard	Switzerland	56.73	2	56.88	1	1:53.61	
2nd place, silver medalist(s)	12	Fabio Gstrein	Austria	57.08	3	56.88	1	1:53.96	+0.35
3rd place, bronze medalist(s)	5	Henrik Kristoffersen	Norway	57.73	6	57.01	3	1:54.74	+1.13
4	7	Timon Haugan	Norway	57.10	4	57.93	16	1:55.03	+1.42
5	8	Armand Marchant	Belgium	57.34	5	58.27	18	1:55.61	+2.00
6	15	Tanguy Nef	Switzerland	58.46	11	57.17	5	1:55.63	+2.02
7	22	Eirik Hystad Solberg	Norway	58.71	14	57.03	4	1:55.74	+2.13
8	17	Michael Matt	Austria	58.34	9	57.41	9	1:55.75	+2.14
9	13	Linus Straßer	Germany	58.49	12	57.29	7	1:55.78	+2.17
10	16	Marco Schwarz	Austria	58.10	7	57.69	14	1:55.79	+2.18
11	26	Matthias Iten	Switzerland	58.96	16	57.27	6	1:56.23	+2.62
12	37	Tommaso Saccardi	Italy	58.37	10	57.97	17	1:56.34	+2.73
13	25	Filip Zubčić	Croatia	58.93	15	57.43	11	1:56.36	+2.75
14	29	Fabian Ax Swartz	Sweden	59.19	17	57.39	8	1:56.58	+2.97
15	19	Daniel Yule	Switzerland	59.42	18	57.48	12	1:56.90	+3.29
16	28	Billy Major	Great Britain	58.66	13	58.59	19	1:57.25	+3.64
17	20	Dave Ryding	Great Britain	59.88	19	57.60	13	1:57.48	+3.87
18	10	Steven Amiez	France	1:00.18	20	57.41	9	1:57.59	+3.98
19	33	Joaquim Salarich	Spain	1:00.32	21	57.86	15	1:58.18	+4.57
20	38	Shiro Aihara	Japan	1:00.83	22	58.75	20	1:59.58	+5.97
21	44	Xavier Cornella	Andorra	1:03.01	24	58.95	21	2:01.96	+8.35
22	61	Andrej Drukarov	Lithuania	1:02.41	23	1:00.03	24	2:02.44	+8.83
23	49	Marko Šljivić	Bosnia and Herzegovina	1:03.05	25	59.91	23	2:02.96	+9.35
24	60	Tomás Holscher	Chile	1:03.94	27	59.89	22	2:03.83	+10.22
25	47	Jón Erik Sigurðsson	Iceland	1:04.51	30	1:01.12	25	2:05.63	+12.02
26	52	Barnabás Szőllős	Israel	1:03.32	26	1:02.36	27	2:05.68	+12.07
27	57	Giovanni Ongaro	Brazil	1:04.66	31	1:02.21	26	2:06.87	+13.26
28	54	Matthieu Osch	Luxembourg	1:04.22	28	1:03.24	29	2:07.46	+13.85
29	62	Richardson Viano	Haiti	1:04.31	29	1:03.49	30	2:07.80	+14.19
30	70	Alexandru Ștefănescu	Romania	1:05.58	32	1:03.52	31	2:09.10	+15.49
31	58	Cormac Comerford	Ireland	1:07.87	35	1:02.37	28	2:10.24	+16.63
32	65	Dmytro Shepiuk	Ukraine	1:05.62	33	1:06.29	32	2:11.91	+18.30
33	67	Mohammad Kiyadarbandsari	Iran	1:09.49	36	1:07.28	33	2:16.77	+23.16
34	80	Yianno Kouyoumdjian	Cyprus	1:10.88	39	1:08.58	34	2:19.46	+25.85
35	87	Faiz Basha	Singapore	1:11.53	40	1:08.92	35	2:20.45	+26.84
36	90	Troy Chang	Chinese Taipei	1:11.56	41	1:11.29	36	2:22.85	+29.24
37	85	Branislav Peković	Montenegro	1:14.79	42	1:14.38	38	2:29.17	+35.56
38	88	Altanzulyn Ariunbat	Mongolia	1:16.86	43	1:13.16	37	2:30.02	+36.41
39	93	Arif Khan	India	1:22.12	44	1:19.48	39	2:41.60	+47.99
	1	Atle Lie McGrath	Norway	56.14	1	DNF		—	
	4	Clément Noël	France	58.10	7	DNF		—	
	64	Medet Nazarov	Uzbekistan	1:07.51	34	DNF		—	
	91	Andrea El Hayek	Lebanon	1:10.64	38	DNF		—	
	89	Harutyun Harutyunyan	Armenia	1:10.12	37	DSQ		—	
	3	Paco Rassat	France	DNF		—			
	6	Lucas Pinheiro Braathen	Brazil	DNF		—			
	9	Eduard Hallberg	Finland	DNF		—			
	11	Manuel Feller	Austria	DNF		—			
	14	Alex Vinatzer	Italy	DNF		—			
	18	Albert Popov	Bulgaria	DNF		—			
	21	Samuel Kolega	Croatia	DNF		—			
	23	Tommaso Sala	Italy	DNF		—			
	24	Laurie Taylor	Great Britain	DNF		—			
	27	Kristoffer Jakobsen	Sweden	DNF		—			
	30	Sam Maes	Belgium	DNF		—			
	31	AJ Ginnis	Greece	DNF		—			
	32	Istok Rodeš	Croatia	DNF		—			
	35	Jung Dong-hyun	South Korea	DNF		—			
	36	Jesper Pohjolainen	Finland	DNF		—			
	39	Tormis Laine	Estonia	DNF		—			
	40	Kalin Zlatkov	Bulgaria	DNF		—			
	41	Léo Anguenot	France	DNF		—			
	42	Simon Efimov	Individual Neutral Athletes	DNF		—			
	43	Christian Oliveira Søvik	Brazil	DNF		—			
	45	Bálint Úry	Hungary	DNF		—			
	46	Fabian Gratz	Germany	DNF		—			
	48	Michał Jasiczek	Poland	DNF		—			
	50	Denni Xhepa	Albania	DNF		—			
	51	Tiziano Gravier	Argentina	DNF		—			
	53	Aleksa Tomović	Serbia	DNF		—			
	55	River Radamus	United States	DNF		—			
	56	Marek Müller	Czech Republic	DNF		—			
	63	Nathan Tchibozo	Benin	DNF		—			
	66	Emeric Guerillot	Portugal	DNF		—			
	68	Nicolás Pirozzi	Uruguay	DNF		—			
	69	Rostislav Khokhlov	Kazakhstan	DNF		—			
	71	Thomas Kaan Önol Lang	Turkey	DNF		—			
	72	Fabian Wiest	Thailand	DNF		—			
	73	Henri Rivers	Jamaica	DNF		—			
	74	Luka Buchukuri	Georgia	DNF		—			
	75	Francis Ceccarelli	Philippines	DNF		—			
	76	Alexander Astridge	United Arab Emirates	DNF		—			
	77	Lasse Gaxiola	Mexico	DNF		—			
	78	Shannon-Ogbnai Abeda	Eritrea	DNF		—			
	79	Liu Xiaochen	China	DNF		—			
	82	Thomas Weir	South Africa	DNF		—			
	83	Drin Kokaj	Kosovo	DNF		—			
	84	Timur Shakirov	Kyrgyzstan	DNF		—			
	86	Adrian Yung	Hong Kong	DNF		—			
	92	Winston Tang	Guinea-Bissau	DNF		—			
	94	Rafael Mini	San Marino	DNF		—			
	95	Fayik Abdi	Saudi Arabia	DNF		—			
	96	Muhammad Karim	Pakistan	DNF		—			
	34	Tobias Kastlunger	Italy	DSQ		—			
	81	Nikhil Alleyne	Trinidad and Tobago	DSQ		—			
	59	Pietro Tranchina	Morocco	DNS		—			
