= Elisabeth Reisinger =

Austrian alpine skier

Personal information
- Born: 2 August 1996 (age 29) Peilstein, Austria
- Height: 1.73 m (5 ft 8 in)

Skiing career
- Sport: Alpine skiing
- Club: SU Foresta Boema
- Disciplines: Speed events
- World Cup debut: 2015–16

World Cup
- Seasons: 7
- Podiums: 0
Medal record
Women's alpine skiing
Representing Austria
European Youth Olympic Festival
Gold medal – first place	2013 Brașov	Team event

Elisabeth Reisinger (born 2 August 1996) is an Austrian alpine skier.

== Career ==
In 2019 she won the general classification of the Europa Cup, also winning two rankings of the discipline.

== World Cup results ==
Top 10

Date	Place	Discipline	Rank
29-01-2022	(Germany) Garmisch-Partenkirchen	Downhill	6
22-01-2022	(Italy) Cortina d'Ampezzo	Downhill	7
08-02-2020	(Germany) Garmisch-Partenkirchen	Downhill	10
25-01-2020	(Bulgaria) Bansko	Downhill	7
12-01-2020	(Austria) Altenmarkt-Zauchensee	Alpine combined	10

== Europa Cup results ==
Reisinger has won an overall Europa Cup and two specialty standings.

- FIS Alpine Ski Europa Cup
  - Overall: 2019
  - Downhill: 2019
  - Super-G: 2019
