= Christian Oliveira Søvik =

Brazilian alpine skier (born 2001)

Personal information
- Born: 27 December 2001 (age 24) Rio de Janeiro, Brazil
- Height: 1.87 m (6 ft 2 in)

Skiing career
- Country: Brazil (since 2025); Norway (2017–2025)
- Sport: Alpine skiing
- College team: Denver Pioneers
- Club: Kjelsås IL
- Disciplines: Slalom, giant slalom

Olympics
- Teams: 1 – (2026)
- Medals: 0

Christian Oliveira Søvik (born 27 December 2001) is a Norwegian-Brazilian alpine ski racer. He represented Brazil at the 2026 Winter Olympics.

== Biography ==
Born in Rio de Janeiro, Søvik is the son of a Norwegian father and a Brazilian mother, thus holding citizenship of both countries. He moved to Norway in 2006 when he was four years old.

He made his international racing debut on 27 November 2017, at a FIS race in Hemsedal, at that time still representing the Norwegian Ski Federation. His first major international event was the 2022 World Junior Championships in Panorama Mountain Village, British Columbia, in March 2022. There, his best result was sixth place in the alpine combined. Up to that point, Søvik had primarily competed in FIS races in Scandinavia and in the Europa Cup.

In 2023, Søvik moved to the United States to attend the University of Denver, where he participated in various college races as well as the Nor-Am Cup. At the start of the 2025–26 season, he switched to the Brazilian Snow Sports Federation, competing in his first race for Brazil on 25 July 2025, in El Colorado, Chile. Discussing his motivation for switching national teams, Søvik said, "My decision was based primarily on my personal connection to Brazil. I was born there, I have family there, and I've always felt a strong link to the country." In his first Europa Cup race representing Brazil, he took 20th place in the slalom at Levi, Finland. Later that season, he qualified for the 2026 Winter Olympics. At the Games, in a race noted for its high rate of attrition, Søvik was among the 49 competitors (of 95 starters) who were not able to successfully complete their first run.

== Olympic results ==
Year
Year	Age	Slalom	Giant slalom	Super-G	Downhill	Team combined
2026	24	DNF1	—	—	—	—
