= Bjørnar Neteland =

Norwegian alpine ski racer (born 1991)

Personal information
- Born: 20 May 1991 (age 35) Bergen, Hordaland

Skiing career
- Sport: Alpine skiing
- Club: Fana IL
- Disciplines: Super G, giant slalom, combined

Bjørnar Neteland (born 20 May 1991) is a Norwegian alpine ski racer. He competes in Super G, giant slalom and Combined. He competed at the 2017 World Championships in St. Moritz, Switzerland, where he placed 25th in the Super-G.
