= Eduarda Ribera =

Brazilian cross-country skier (born 2004)

Personal information
- Full name: Eduarda Westemaier Ribera
- Nickname: Duda
- Born: 21 November 2004 (age 21) Jundiaí, Brazil
- Height: 168 cm (5 ft 6 in)
- Weight: 52 kg (115 lb)

Sport
- Country: Brazil
- Sport: Cross-country skiing

Achievements and titles
- Olympic finals: 2022, 2026

Eduarda Westemaier Ribera (born 21 November 2004) is a Brazilian cross-country skier. She is the sister of Paralympic skier Cristian Ribera.

== Career ==
At the 2022 Winter Olympics, she finished in 88th place in the women's sprint in cross-country skiing. In the women's 10 kilometre classical, she finished in 90th place.

At the 2026 Winter Olympics, she finished in 72nd place in the women's sprint in cross-country skiing.

Together with Bruna Moura, she finished in 21st place in the women's team sprint in cross-country skiing at the 2026 Winter Olympics, which was the best result ever won by Brazil in this category.
