= Kaja Norbye =

Norwegian alpine skier (born 1999)

Kaja Norbye (born 19 May 1999) is a Norwegian alpine skier.

She competed in five events at the 2018 World Junior Championships, a 7th place in the combined event her best result, and then in four events at the 2019 World Junior Championships where she won a bronze medal in the giant slalom and a silver medal in the combined event.

She made her FIS Ski Jumping World Cup debut in March 2019 in Spindleruv Mlyn, collecting her first World Cup points with a 22nd place. She repeated this placement in December 2019 in Courchevel.

She represents the sports club IL Heming.
