= 2022 FIS Alpine Ski Australia-New Zealand Cup =

Discipline	Men	Women
Overall	(United States) Isaiah Nelson	(United States) Ava Sunshine
Super-G	(New Zealand) Willis Feasey	(Canada) Candace Crawford
Giant slalom	(United States) Isaiah Nelson	(United States) Katie Hensien
Slalom	(United States) Benjamin Ritchie	(United States) Zoe Zimmermann

Competition
Locations	1 venues	1 venues
Individual	6 events	6 events

The 2022 FIS Alpine Ski Australia-New Zealand Cup is the Australia-New Zealand Cup season, the second international level competition in alpine skiing.

== Men ==
=== Calendar ===
Stage	Date	Place	Discipline	Winner	Second	Third	Details
1	22 August 2022	(New Zealand) Coronet Peak	Slalom	(United States) Isaiah Nelson	(United States) Benjamin Ritchie	(Switzerland) Dionys Kippel	
2	23 August 2022	(New Zealand) Coronet Peak	Slalom	(United States) Benjamin Ritchie	(Switzerland) Reto Schmidiger	(Norway) Andreas Sønsterud Amdahl	
3	27 August 2022	(New Zealand) Coronet Peak	Super-G	(New Zealand) Willis Feasey	(Slovakia) Adam Žampa	(Slovakia) Teo Žampa	
4	27 August 2022	(New Zealand) Coronet Peak	Super-G	(New Zealand) Willis Feasey	(Slovakia) Adam Žampa	(United States) Garret Driller	
5	29 August 2022	(New Zealand) Coronet Peak	Giant slalom	(United States) Isaiah Nelson	(Norway) Timon Haugan	(Slovakia) Andreas Žampa	
6	30 August 2022	(New Zealand) Coronet Peak	Giant slalom	(Slovakia) Andreas Žampa	(United States) Isaiah Nelson	(Slovakia) Adam Žampa	

=== Rankings ===
==== Overall ====
Rank	after 6 of 6 races	Points
1	(United States) Isaiah Nelson	330
2	(Slovakia) Adam Žampa	270
3	(New Zealand) Willis Feasey	235
4	(United States) Benjamin Ritchie	212
5	(Slovakia) Andreas Žampa	210

==== Slalom ====
Rank	after 2 of 2 races	Points
1	(United States) Benjamin Ritchie	180
2	(United States) Isaiah Nelson	150
3	(Switzerland) Reto Schmidiger	130
4	(Norway) Andreas Sønsterud Amdahl	100
5	(Switzerland) Dionys Kippel	60

==== Super-G ====
Rank	after 2 of 2 races	Points
1	(New Zealand) Willis Feasey	200
2	(Slovakia) Adam Žampa	160
3	(United States) Samuel Dupratt	95
4	(Australia) Hugh McAdam	81
5	(Italy) Vittorio De Pieri	80

==== Giant slalom ====
Rank	after 2 of 2 races	Points
1	(United States) Isaiah Nelson	180
2	(Slovakia) Andreas Žampa	160
3	(Norway) Timon Haugan	130
4	(Slovakia) Adam Žampa	110
5	(Liechtenstein) Ian Gut	90

== Women ==
=== Calendar ===
Stage	Date	Place	Discipline	Winner	Second	Third	Details
1	22 August 2022	(New Zealand) Coronet Peak	Slalom	(United States) Katie Hensien	(United States) Ava Sunshine	(United States) Zoe Zimmermann	
2	23 August 2022	(New Zealand) Coronet Peak	Slalom	(United States) Zoe Zimmermann	(United States) Ava Sunshine	(United States) Allie Resnick	
3	27 August 2022	(New Zealand) Coronet Peak	Super-G	(Canada) Candace Crawford	(Slovakia) Rebeka Jančová	(Finland) Charlotte Henriksson	
4	27 August 2022	(New Zealand) Coronet Peak	Super-G	(Canada) Candace Crawford	(United States) Ava Sunshine	(New Zealand) Alice Robinson	
5	29 August 2022	(New Zealand) Coronet Peak	Giant slalom	(Canada) Candace Crawford	(United States) Katie Hensien	(Finland) Riikka Honkanen	
6	30 August 2022	(New Zealand) Coronet Peak	Giant slalom	(New Zealand) Alice Robinson	(United States) Ava Sunshine	(United States) Katie Hensien	

=== Rankings ===
==== Overall ====
Rank	after 6 of 6 races	Points
1	(United States) Ava Sunshine	370
2	(Canada) Candace Crawford	300
3	(United States) Katie Hensien	240
4	(United States) Zoe Zimmermann	196
5	(New Zealand) Alice Robinson	160

==== Slalom ====
Rank	after 2 of 2 races	Points
1	(United States) Zoe Zimmermann	160
1	(United States) Ava Sunshine	160
3	(United States) Katie Hensien	100
3	(Switzerland) Lara Baumann	100
5	(New Zealand) Piera Hudson	80

==== Super-G ====
Rank	after 2 of 2 races	Points
1	(Canada) Candace Crawford	200
2	(Slovakia) Rebeka Jančová	130
3	(Finland) Charlotte Henriksson	100
3	(Austria) Emma Amann	86
5	(United States) Ava Sunshine	80

==== Giant slalom ====
Rank	after 2 of 2 races	Points
1	(United States) Katie Hensien	140
2	(United States) Ava Sunshine	130
3	(Canada) Candace Crawford	100
3	(New Zealand) Alice Robinson	100
5	(Switzerland) Elise Hitter	95
