= Andrea Ballerin =

Italian alpine skier

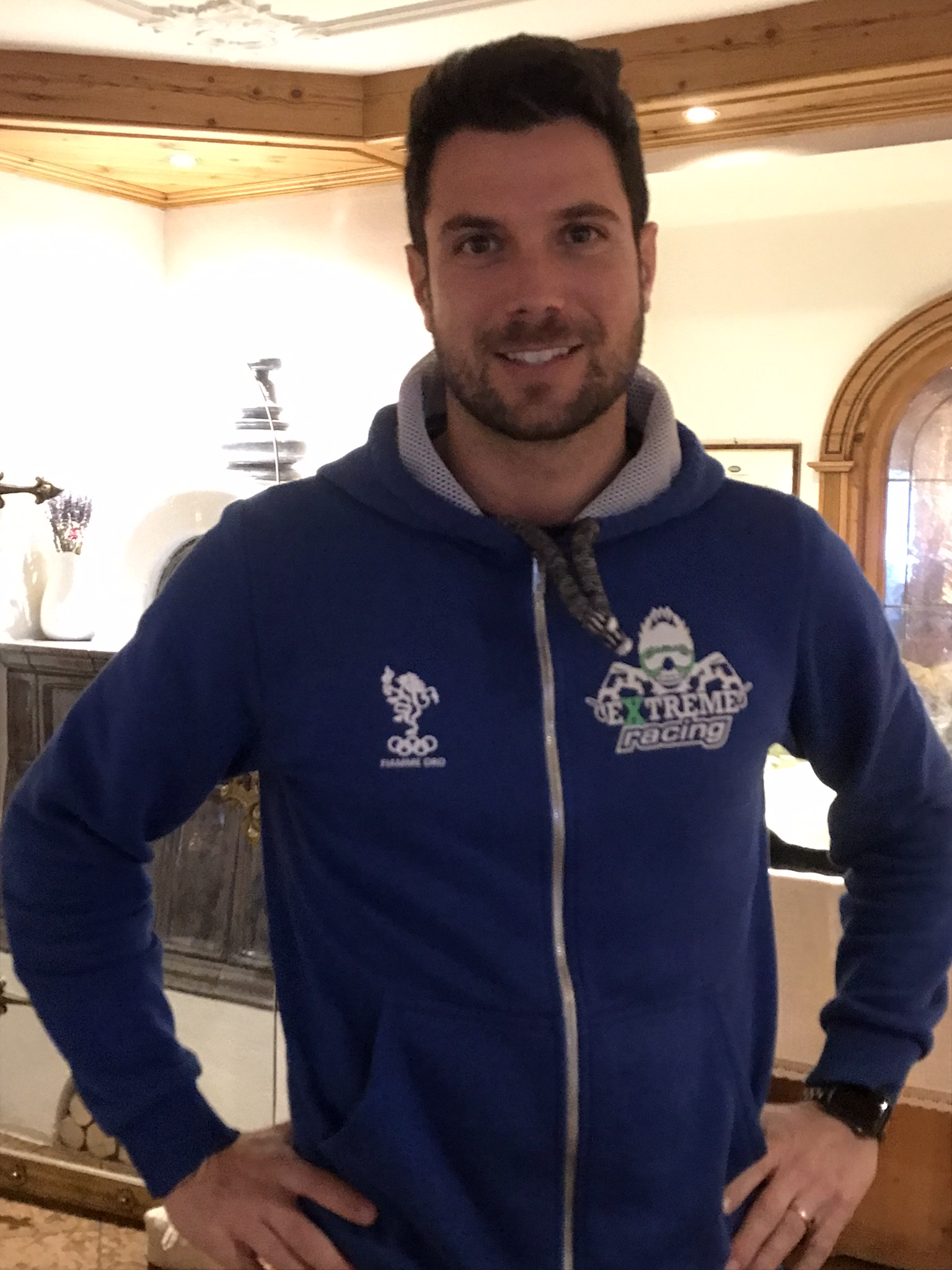
- Ballerin in 2023

Personal information
- Born: 1 February 1989 (age 37) Bergamo, Italy

Skiing career
- Sport: Alpine skiing
- Club: G.S. Fiamme Oro
- Retired: 2020
- Disciplines: Technical events
- World Cup debut: 2011

World Cup
- Seasons: 11

Andrea Ballerin (born 1 February 1989) is an Italian alpine skiing coach and former alpine skier.

== Career ==
During his career he has achieved two results among the top 20 in the FIS Alpine Ski World Cup.

== World Cup results ==
Top 20

Date	Place	Discipline	Rank
19-12-2018	(Austria) Saalbach-Hinterglemm	Giant Slalom	16
25-10-2015	(Austria) Soelden	Giant Slalom	19
