= Bruna Moura =

Brazilian cross-country skier (born 1994)

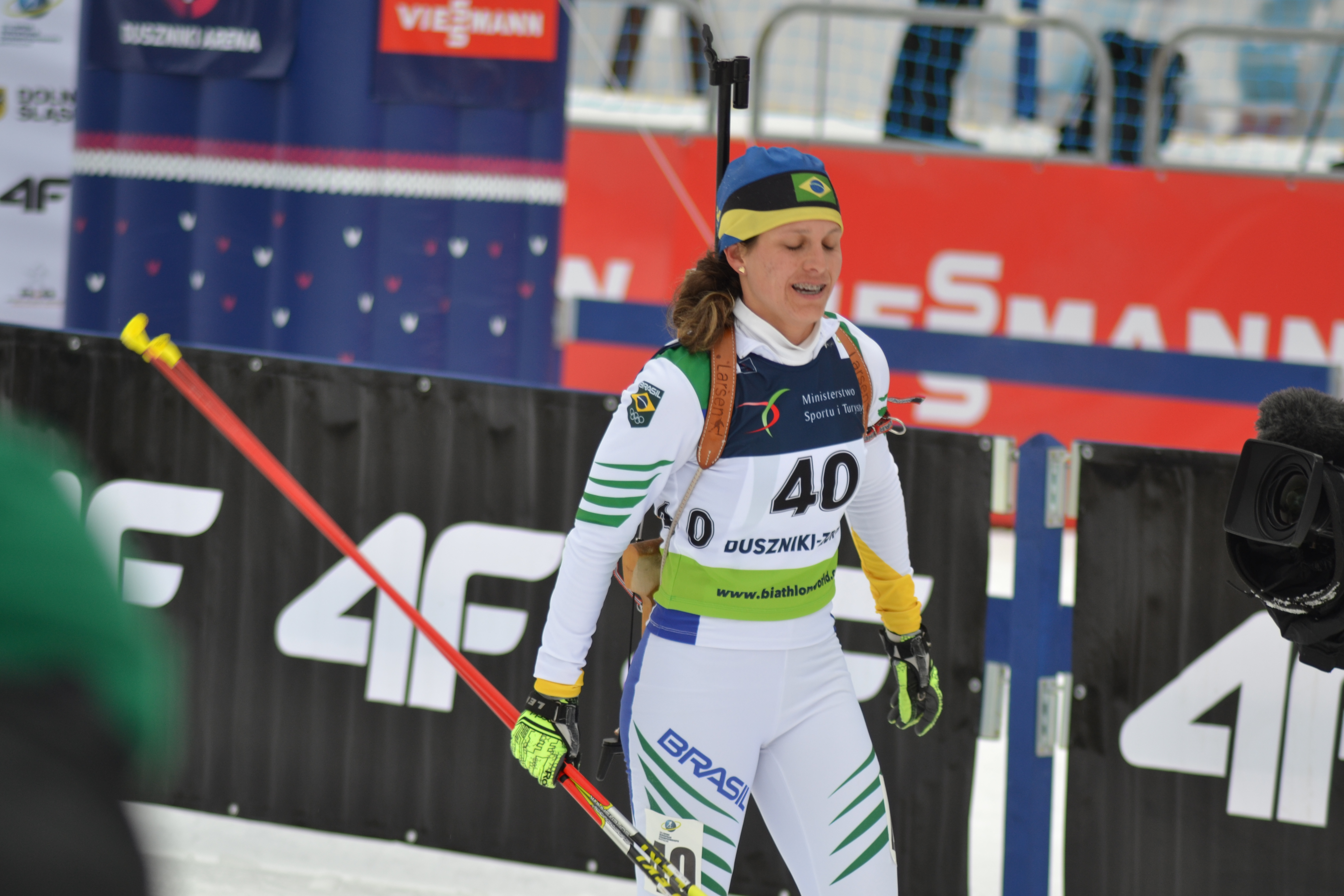
- Bruna in 2017

Personal information
- Full name: Bruna Rafaela de Moura
- Born: 24 April 1994 (age 32) Caraguatatuba, Brazil

Sport
- Country: Brazil
- Sport: Cross-country skiing

Achievements and titles
- Olympic finals: 2026

Bruna Rafaela de Moura (born 24 April 1994) is a Brazilian cross-country skier and biathlete.

She represented her country at the FIS Nordic World Ski Championships 2017 in Lahtis, where she finished 79th in the sprint.

Moura could not participate at the 2022 Winter Olympics after suffering a heart surgery and being victim of a car accident in Austria a few days before the Olympics.

== 2026 Winter Olympics ==
At the 2026 Winter Olympics she finished in 74th place in the women's sprint in cross-country skiing. In the women's 10 kilometre freestyle, she finished in 99th place.

Together with Eduarda Ribera she finished in 21st place in the women's team sprint in Cross-country skiing at the 2026 Winter Olympics, the best position by Brazilians in Cross-country skiing at the Winter Olympics.
