= Lucas Pinheiro Braathen =

Brazilian alpine skier (born 2000)

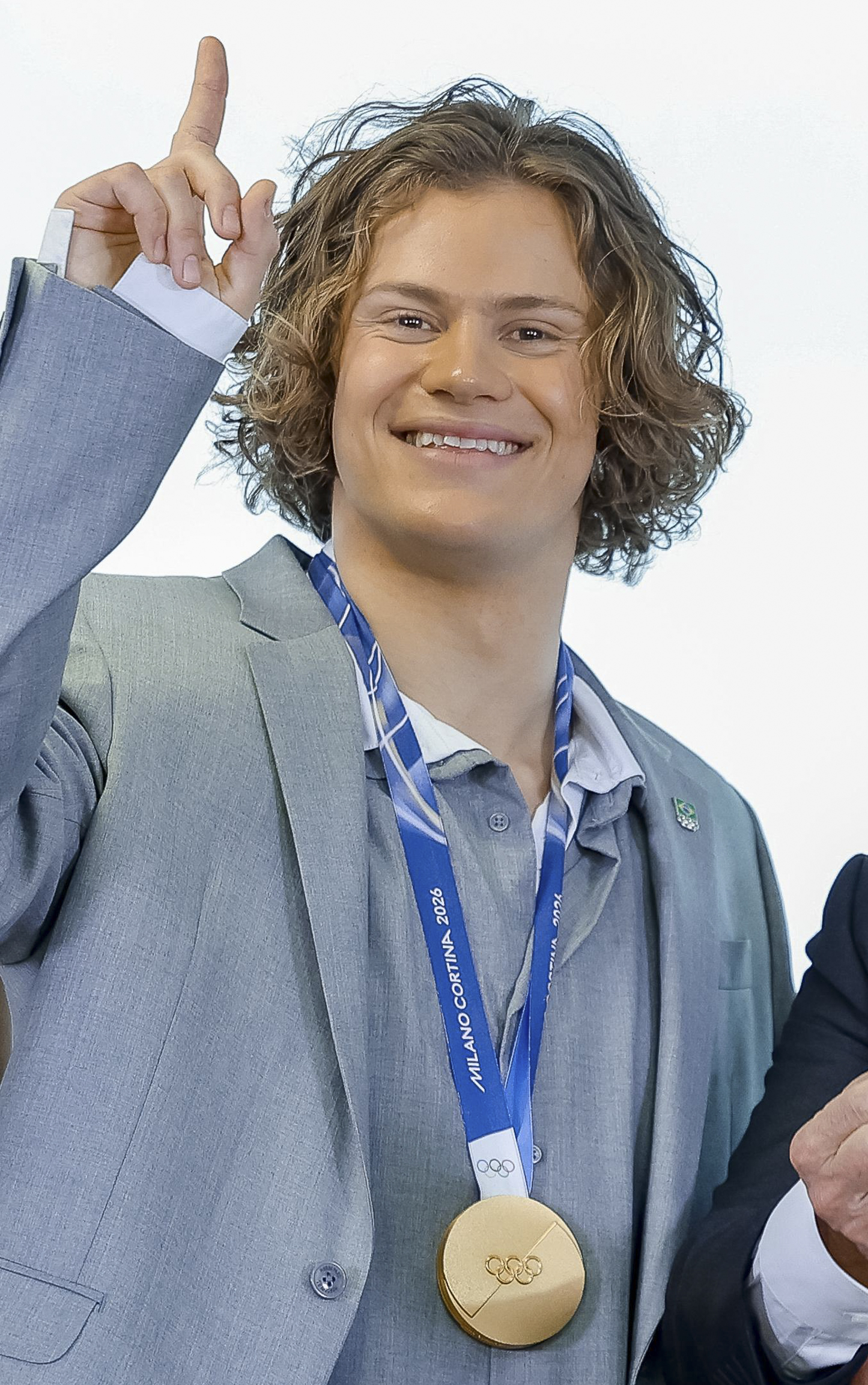
- Pinheiro Braathen in 2026 with his gold medal won at the 2026 Winter Olympic Games

Personal information
- Born: 19 April 2000 (age 26) Oslo, Norway
- Height: 1.83 m (6 ft 0 in)

Skiing career
- Country: Brazil (since 2024); Norway (2018–2023)
- Sport: Alpine skiing
- Club: Bærums Skiklub
- Disciplines: Slalom, giant slalom
- World Cup debut: 8 December 2018 (age 18)

Olympics
- Teams: 2 – (2022, 2026)
- Medals: 1 (1 gold)

World Championships
- Teams: 2 – (2023, 2025)
- Medals: 0

World Cup
- Seasons: 8 – (2019–2023, 2025–2027)
- Wins: 10 – (5 SL, 5 GS)
- Podiums: 27 – (15 SL, 12 GS)
- Overall titles: 0 – (2nd in 2026)
- Discipline titles: 2 – (GS – 2026; SL – 2023)
Medal record
Men's alpine skiing
Representing Brazil
World Cup race podiums
Event	1st	2nd	3rd
Slalom	2	2	3
Giant slalom	3	5	0
Total	5	7	3
Olympic Games
Gold medal – first place	2026 Milano Cortina	Giant slalom
Representing Norway
World Cup race podiums
Event	1st	2nd	3rd
Slalom	3	2	3
Giant slalom	2	2	0
Total	5	4	3
Junior World Championships
Silver medal – second place	2018 Davos	Team
Silver medal – second place	2019 Val di Fassa	Super-G
Bronze medal – third place	2019 Val di Fassa	Combined

Lucas Pinheiro Braathen (/ˈluːkəs piˈɲeɾu brah-ten/, born 19 April 2000) is a Norwegian and Brazilian alpine ski racer who specializes in the technical events of slalom and giant slalom. He is the men's giant slalom champion at the 2026 Winter Olympics, becoming the first Brazilian and South American in history to win a medal at the Winter Olympics, as well as the first athlete representing any tropical nation to win a Winter Olympic medal.

Until his retirement from World Cup racing in October 2023, he represented Norway in international events. In March 2024, Pinheiro Braathen announced that he would return to the alpine skiing circuit, representing Brazil instead.

== Early life ==
Pinheiro Braathen was born in Oslo to a Norwegian father, Bjørn Braathen, and a Brazilian mother, Alessandra Pinheiro. His parents divorced when he was three years old and he went to Brazil with his mother to live in the city of Campinas. Later in his childhood, he moved back to Norway to live with his father while regularly visiting Brazil. He grew up speaking Norwegian and Portuguese.

Pinheiro Braathen first skied when he was three or four years old, but he did not start skiing again until he was nine years old. Braathen also played football as a child, though he preferred skiing as it is an individual sport.

== Career ==
From Hokksund, Pinheiro Braathen raced for Norwegian club Bærums SK. At the Junior World Championships in 2019, he finished fourth and eleventh, followed by a silver medal in super-G, and a bronze medal in the combined event. He made his World Cup debut in December 2018 in Val d'Isere, and collected his first points (five) with a 26th-place finish.

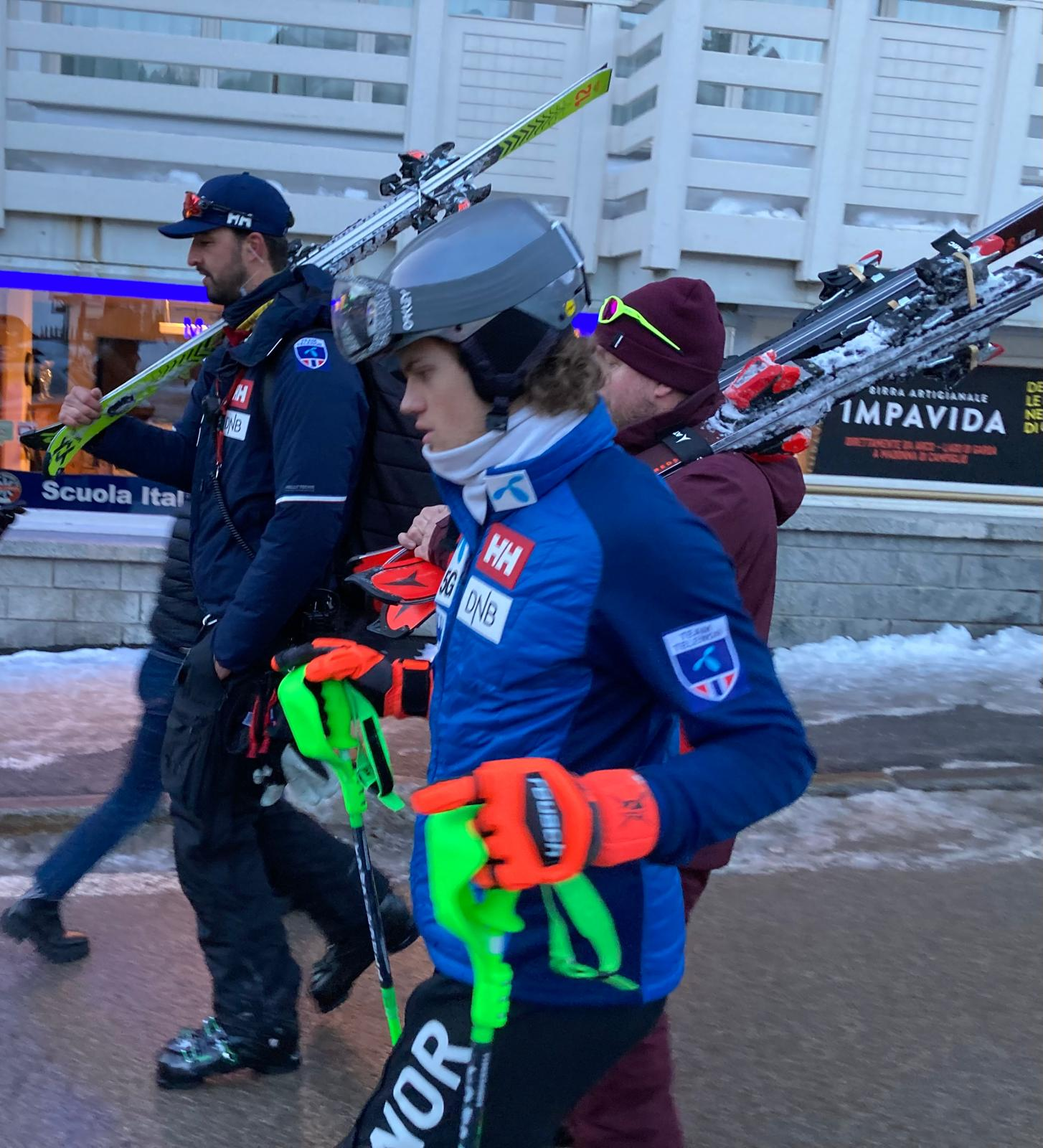
Pinheiro Braathen in December 2022 at Canalone Miramonti, Madonna di Campiglio

Pinheiro Braathen recorded his first victory (and podium) in October 2020 at the opener of the 2020–21 season, a giant slalom in Sölden. In 2022, he won his first slalom at the Lauberhorn race in Wengen, going from 29th place after the first run to first place after the second run, the largest jump to victory at that time.

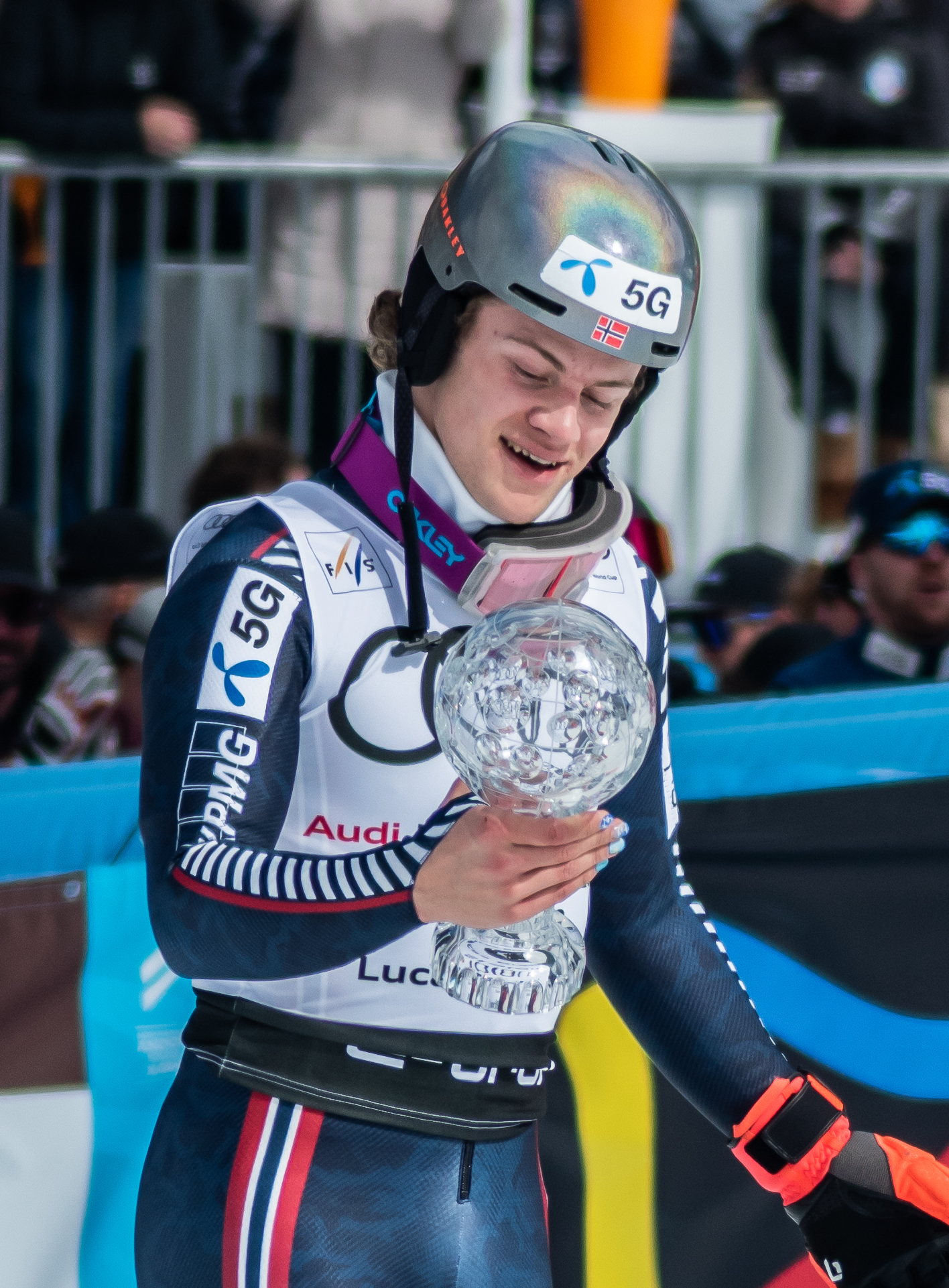
Pinheiro Braathen with the Small Crystal Globe of the 2023 Men's Slalom

Pinheiro Braathen announced his retirement from World Cup racing on 27 October 2023, a day before the new season's opening event in Sölden. However, on 7 March 2024, he announced his return to alpine ski racing as a competitor for Brazil instead of Norway. On 27 October 2024, exactly a year after he had announced his retirement, he returned at the World Cup giant slalom season opener in Sölden, narrowly finishing in 4th place behind three of his former teammates from Norway and scoring the first ever world cup points for Brazil in alpine skiing.

On 6 February 2026, Pinheiro Braathen participated in the opening ceremony of the 2026 Winter Olympics as the flag bearer of Brazil, alongside Nicole Silveira. On 14 February, Braathen arrived in the Milano Cortina 2026 as the second in the slalom, giant slalom and overall rankings after a successful 2025–26 FIS Alpine Ski World Cup, behind only skiing superstar Swiss Marco Odermatt. In the giant slalom Braathen put himself in pole position for gold with a leading time of 1:13.92 in the first run, almost a full second faster than second-place Odermatt. Braathen's second run saw him maintain his lead to secure the gold medal in a combined time of 2:25.00, with Odermatt (2:25.58) and Loïc Meillard (2:26.17) of Switzerland taking silver and bronze, respectively.

Braathen's historic victory made him the first Latin American and Brazilian, as well as the first athlete from any tropical nation, to win a medal in the Winter Olympics.

After the Olympics, Pinheiro Braathen competed in the penultimate World Cup event of the season in Kranjska Gora, Slovenia. He topped the field in the giant slalom, winning a title in that discipline for the first time while representing Brazil. On the next day he attained another podium with a third-place finish in the slalom.

Next, Pinheiro Braathen competed in the last World Cup event of the season in Lillehammer, Norway. He topped the field in the giant slalom with a total time of 2:20.65, winning the title in that discipline and securing that season's crystal globe on the giant slalom, the first of his career and the first ever for a Brazilian.

== Personal life ==
Pinheiro Braathen speaks Norwegian, Portuguese, English, and German fluently, is a fan of Brazilian musical genres such as bossa nova, and is a supporter of São Paulo Futebol Clube. He currently has a home base established inside of Milan Italy, and he says "I owe it all to the winter Olympics for helping me find this new home." Part of his family resides in Paulínia, northwest of the state of São Paulo, while his mother lives in New Zealand.

In June 2025, he made his romantic relationship with Brazilian actress Isadora Cruz public.

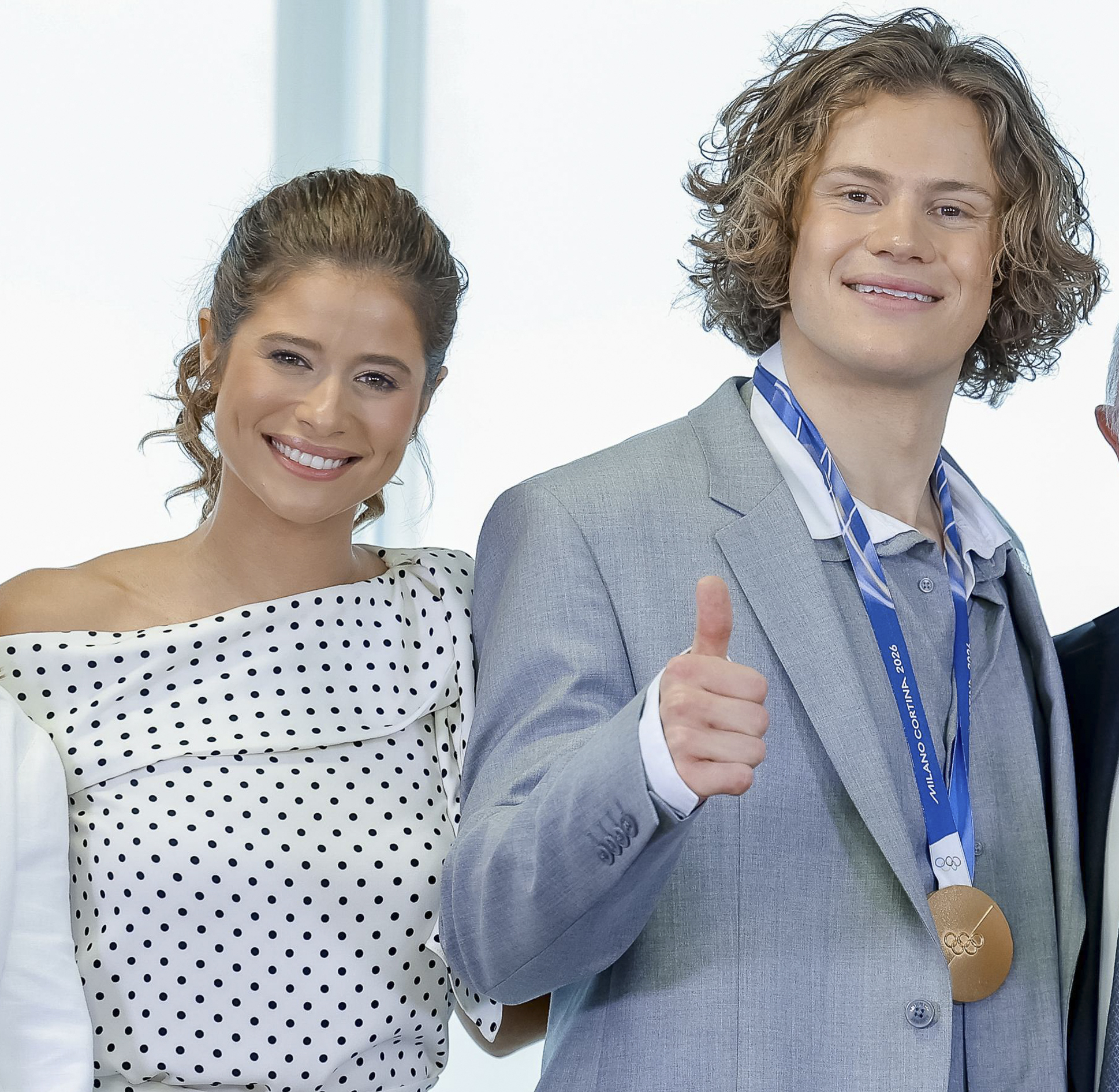
Lucas Pinheiro Braathen with Isadora Cruz in 2026

== World Cup results ==
=== Season titles ===
- 2 titles – (1 SL, 1 GS)

Season	
Season	Discipline
2023	Slalom
2026	Giant slalom

=== Season standings ===
Season
Season	Age	Overall	Slalom	Giant slalom	Super-G	Downhill	Combined	Parallel
2019	18	147	—	51	—	—	—	—N/a
2020	19	27	24	15	—	—	—	10
2021	20	43	—	15	—	—	—N/a	18
2022	21	9	4	4	—	—	—N/a	—
2023	22	4	1	7	39	—	—N/a	—N/a
2024	23	temporary retirement					—N/a	—N/a
2025	24	6	6	5	—	—	—N/a	—N/a
2026	25	2	3	1	—	—	—N/a	—N/a
2027	26	1	3	1	—	—	—N/a	—N/a

Standings through 22 November 2026

=== Race podiums ===
- 10 wins – (5 SL, 5 GS)
- 27 podiums – (15 SL, 12 GS); 62 top tens

Season
Season	Date	Location	Discipline	Place
2021	18 October 2020	Sölden, Austria	Giant slalom	1st
2022	16 January 2022	Wengen, Switzerland	Slalom	1st
2022	22 January 2022	Kitzbühel, Austria	Slalom	2nd
2022	12 March 2022	Kranjska Gora, Slovenia	Giant slalom	2nd
2022	19 March 2022	Courchevel, France	Giant slalom	2nd
2023	11 December 2022	Val d'Isère, France	Slalom	1st
2023	18 December 2022	Alta Badia, Italy	Giant slalom	1st
2023	8 January 2023	Adelboden, Switzerland	Slalom	1st
2023	15 January 2023	Wengen, Switzerland	Slalom	3rd
2023	22 January 2023	Kitzbühel, Austria	Slalom	3rd
2023	24 January 2023	Schladming, Austria	Slalom	3rd
2023	19 March 2023	Soldeu, Andorra	Slalom	2nd
2025	9 December 2024	Beaver Creek, United States	Giant slalom	2nd
2025	11 January 2025	Adelboden, Switzerland	Slalom	2nd
2025	26 January 2025	Kitzbühel, Austria	Slalom	3rd
2025	1 March 2025	Kranjska Gora, Slovenia	Giant slalom	2nd
2025	16 March 2025	Hafjell, Norway	Slalom	3rd
2026	16 November 2025	Levi, Finland	Slalom	1st
2026	21 December 2025	Alta Badia, Italy	Giant slalom	2nd
2026	10 January 2026	Adelboden, Switzerland	Giant slalom	2nd
2026	18 January 2026	Wengen, Switzerland	Slalom	2nd
2026	27 January 2026	Schladming, Austria	Giant slalom	2nd
2026	7 March 2026	Kranjska Gora, Slovenia	Giant slalom	1st
2026	8 March 2026	Kranjska Gora, Slovenia	Slalom	3rd
2026	24 March 2026	Hafjell, Norway	Giant slalom	1st
2027	25 October 2026	Sölden, Austria	Giant slalom	1st
2027	15 November 2026	Levi, Finland	Slalom	1st

== World Championship results ==
Year
Year	Age	Slalom	Giant slalom	Super-G	Downhill	Combined	Team combined	Parallel	Team event
Representing Norway
2023	22	7	—	—	—	—	—N/a	—	—
Representing Brazil
2025	24	13	14	—	—	—N/a	—	—N/a	—

== Olympic results ==
Year
Year	Age	Slalom	Giant slalom	Super-G	Downhill	Combined	Team combined	Team event
Representing Norway
2022	21	DNF1	DNF2	—	—	—	—N/a	—
Representing Brazil
2026	25	DNF1	1	—	—	—N/a	—	—N/a
