= Marlene Schmotz =

German alpine skier

Personal information
- Born: 6 March 1994 (age 32) Fischbachau, Germany
- Height: 1.63 m (5 ft 4 in)

Skiing career
- Sport: Alpine skiing
- Club: SC Leitzachtal
- Disciplines: Giant slalom, slalom
- World Cup debut: 15 January 2013 (age 18)

World Championships
- Teams: 1 − (2019)
- Medals: 0

World Cup
- Seasons: 4 − (2014, 2015, 2017, 2019)
- Podiums: 0
- Overall titles: 0 – (85th in 2017)
- Discipline titles: 0 – (47th in SL, 2017)

Marlene Schmotz (born 6 March 1994) is a German World Cup alpine ski racer, specializing in Super-G.

She competed at the World Championships 2019.

== World Championship results ==
Year	Slalom	Giant slalom	Super-G	Downhill	Combined	Team event
2019	DNF	19	—	—	—	4
